= 2018 Under 21 Women's Australian Hockey Championships =

2018 field hockey tournament

2018 Under 21 Women's Australian Championships
Tournament details
- Host country: Australia
- City: Sydney
- Teams: 8
- Venue: Sydney Olympic Park

Final positions
- Champions: (New South Wales) NSW
- Runner-up: (Queensland) QLD
- Third place: (Victoria (state)) VIC

Tournament statistics
- Matches played: 24
- Goals scored: 100 (4.17 per match)
- Top scorer: (Queensland) Rebecca Greiner (7 goals)

The 2018 Women's Under 21 Australian Championships was a field hockey tournament held in the New South Wales city of Sydney between 4–11 July 2018.

New South Wales won the tournament after defeating Queensland 2–1 in the final. Victoria finished in third place after defeating South Australia 4–2 in the bronze medal match.

== Competition format ==
The tournament is divided into two pools, Pool A and Pool B, consisting of four teams in a round robin format. At the conclusion of the pool stage, teams progress to the quarterfinals, where the winners progress to contest the medals, while the losing teams playoff for fifth to eighth place.

== Teams ==
- (Australian Capital Territory) ACT
- (South Australia) SA
- (New South Wales) NSW
- (Tasmania) TAS
- (New South Wales) NSW B
- (Victoria (state)) VIC
- (Queensland) QLD
- (Western Australia) WA

== Results ==
=== Preliminary round ===
==== Pool A ====
| Pos | Team | Pld | W | D | L | GF | GA | GD | Pts |
|---|---|---|---|---|---|---|---|---|---|
| 1 | (New South Wales) NSW | 3 | 3 | 0 | 0 | 14 | 5 | +9 | 9 |
| 2 | (South Australia) SA | 3 | 1 | 1 | 1 | 5 | 5 | 0 | 4 |
| 3 | (Victoria (state)) VIC | 3 | 0 | 2 | 1 | 4 | 7 | −3 | 2 |
| 4 | (Tasmania) TAS | 3 | 0 | 1 | 2 | 3 | 9 | −6 | 1 |

Source: Hockey Australia

4 July 2018
13:00

| NSW (New South Wales) | 5–2 | (Victoria (state)) VIC |
|---|---|---|
| Callander 8'; Arnott 12', 51'; Gillard 19'; Blamey 21' | Report | Colasurdo 25'; A. Utri 44' |

Sydney Olympic Park: Pitch 1
Umpires:
Tamara Leonard (AUS)
Lauren Berndt (AUS)

4 July 2018
15:00

| SA (South Australia) | 3–0 | (Tasmania) TAS |
|---|---|---|
| Shand 15', 56'; Spano 43' | Report |

Sydney Olympic Park: Pitch 1
Umpires:
Emily Ogden (AUS)
Kimberleigh Todd (AUS)

5 July 2018
12:00

| SA (South Australia) | 2–5 | (New South Wales) NSW |
|---|---|---|
| Shand 15'; De Broughe 24' | Report | Steel 11'; Hemmingway 23'; Callander 27'; Wilson 33'; Lidbetter 43' |

Sydney Olympic Park: Pitch 2
Umpires:
Cassidy Gallagher (AUS)
Tamara Leonard (AUS)

5 July 2018
14:00

| VIC (Victoria (state)) | 2–2 | (Tasmania) TAS |
|---|---|---|
| Colasurdo 4'; Downes 47' | Report | Hinton 26'; Westland 45' |

Sydney Olympic Park: Pitch 2
Umpires:
Emily Ogden (AUS)
Deborah O'Connell (AUS)

7 July 2018
13:00

| NSW (New South Wales) | 4–1 | (Tasmania) TAS |
|---|---|---|
| Wilson 5', 6', 42'; Steel 30' | Report | Curtis 13' |

Sydney Olympic Park: Pitch 2
Umpires:
Courtney Pearson (AUS)
Emily Ogden (AUS)

7 July 2018
15:00

| VIC (Victoria (state)) | 0–0 | (South Australia) SA |
|---|---|---|
| | Report |

Sydney Olympic Park: Pitch 2
Umpires:
Deborah O'Connell (AUS)
Kimberleigh Todd (AUS)

==== Pool B ====
| Pos | Team | Pld | W | D | L | GF | GA | GD | Pts |
|---|---|---|---|---|---|---|---|---|---|
| 1 | (Queensland) QLD | 3 | 3 | 0 | 0 | 11 | 0 | +11 | 9 |
| 2 | (Western Australia) WA | 3 | 2 | 0 | 1 | 6 | 3 | +3 | 6 |
| 3 | (Australian Capital Territory) ACT | 3 | 1 | 0 | 2 | 3 | 7 | −4 | 3 |
| 4 | (New South Wales) NSW B | 3 | 0 | 0 | 3 | 2 | 12 | −10 | 0 |

Source: Hockey Australia

4 July 2018
17:00

| WA (Western Australia) | 1–0 | (Australian Capital Territory) ACT |
|---|---|---|
| Morgan 55' | Report |

Sydney Olympic Park: Pitch 1
Umpires:
Deborah O'Connell (AUS)
Cassidy Gallagher (AUS)

4 July 2018
19:00

| QLD (Queensland) | 4–0 | (New South Wales) NSW B |
|---|---|---|
| Greiner 18'; Barrett 23'; K. Fitzpatrick 25'; Punch 45' | Report |

Sydney Olympic Park: Pitch 1
Umpires:
Courtney Pearson (AUS)
Caroline Davis (AUS)

5 July 2018
16:00

| ACT (Australian Capital Territory) | 3–1 | (New South Wales) NSW B |
|---|---|---|
| Deacon 12'; C. Apps 19'; I. Apps 41' | Report | Johnston 45' |

Sydney Olympic Park: Pitch 2
Umpires:
Lauren Berndt (AUS)
Caroline Davis (AUS)

5 July 2018
18:00

| QLD (Queensland) | 2–0 | (Western Australia) WA |
|---|---|---|
| Barrett 5'; Mathison 54' | Report |

Sydney Olympic Park: Pitch 2
Umpires:
Courtney Pearson (AUS)
Kimberleigh Todd (AUS)

7 July 2018
09:00

| WA (Western Australia) | 5–1 | (New South Wales) NSW B |
|---|---|---|
| Johnson 14'; Byrnes 19', 42'; Tonkin 29'; Sertorio 52' | Report | Johnston 59' |

Sydney Olympic Park: Pitch 2
Umpires:
Cassidy Gallagher (AUS)
Lauren Berndt (AUS)

7 July 2018
11:00

| ACT (Australian Capital Territory) | 0–5 | (Queensland) QLD |
|---|---|---|
| | Report | Barrett 20', 52', 56'; Greiner 37'; Eleison 53' |

Sydney Olympic Park: Pitch 2
Umpires:
Caroline Davis (AUS)
Tamara Leonard (AUS)

=== Classification round ===
Quarterfinals
8 July 2018
(New South Wales) NSW | 5
(New South Wales) NSW B | 0
8 July 2018
(Western Australia) WA | 0
(Victoria (state)) VIC | 1
8 July 2018
(South Australia) SA | 3
(Australian Capital Territory) ACT | 2
8 July 2018
(Queensland) QLD | 6
(Tasmania) TAS | 1

Semi-finals
10 July 2018
(New South Wales) NSW (p.s.o) | 1 (4)
(Victoria (state)) VIC | 1 (2)
10 July 2018
(South Australia) SA | 0
(Queensland) QLD | 4

Final
11 July 2018
(New South Wales) NSW | 2
(Queensland) QLD | 1
Third place match
11 July 2018
(Victoria (state)) VIC | 4
(South Australia) SA | 2

==== Quarterfinals ====
8 July 2018
11:00

| NSW (New South Wales) | 5–0 | (New South Wales) NSW B |
|---|---|---|
| Schonell 8', 25'; Steel 9'; Lidbetter 15', 35' | Report |

Sydney Olympic Park: Pitch 2
Umpires:
Emily Ogden (AUS)
Kimberleigh Todd (AUS)

8 July 2018
14:00

| WA (Western Australia) | 0–1 | (Victoria (state)) VIC |
|---|---|---|
| | Report | A. Utri 45+' |

Sydney Olympic Park: Pitch 1
Umpires:
Tamara Leonard (AUS)
Lauren Berndt (AUS)

8 July 2018
15:00

| SA (South Australia) | 3–2 | (Australian Capital Territory) ACT |
|---|---|---|
| Wollstein 18', 35'; Spano 29' | Report | Deacon 12'; Evans 30' |

Sydney Olympic Park: Pitch 2
Umpires:
Caroline Davis (AUS)
Cassidy Gallagher (AUS)

8 July 2018
18:00

| QLD (Queensland) | 6–1 | (Tasmania) TAS |
|---|---|---|
| Greiner 19', 32', 51', 53'; Gallagher 23'; Johnson 41' | Report | Curtis 58' |

Sydney Olympic Park: Pitch 1
Umpires:
Courtney Pearson (AUS)
Deborah O'Connell (AUS)

==== Fifth to eighth place classification ====
Crossover
10 July 2018
(New South Wales) NSW B (p.s.o) | 2 (3)
(Western Australia) WA | 2 (1)
10 July 2018
(Australian Capital Territory) ACT | 2
(Tasmania) TAS | 0

Fifth place match
11 July 2018
(New South Wales) NSW B | 2
(Australian Capital Territory) ACT | 1
Seventh place match
11 July 2018
(Western Australia) WA | 7
(Tasmania) TAS | 3

===== Crossover =====
10 July 2018
12:30

| NSW B (New South Wales) | 2–2 | (Western Australia) WA |
|---|---|---|
| Janes 8'; Pickering 30' | Report | Byrnes 18'; Johnson 43' |
Penalties
| Pickering (penalty shoot-out scored); Hanagan (penalty shoot-out missed); Chaffey (penalty shoot-out scored); Mallon (penalty shoot-out scored) | 3–1 | (penalty shoot-out missed) Bestall; (penalty shoot-out scored) Sertorio; (penalty shoot-out missed) Reid; (penalty shoot-out missed) Tonkin |

Sydney Olympic Park: Pitch 2
Umpires:
Courtney Pearson (AUS)
Deborah O'Connell (AUS)

10 July 2018
14:30

| ACT (Australian Capital Territory) | 2–0 | (Tasmania) TAS |
|---|---|---|
| Deacon 25'; Price 60' | Report |

Sydney Olympic Park: Pitch 2
Umpires:
Kimberleigh Todd (AUS)
Emily Ogden (AUS)

===== Seventh and eighth place =====
11 July 2018
10:00

| WA (Western Australia) | 7–3 | (Tasmania) TAS |
|---|---|---|
| Tonkin 11'; Byrnes 17'; Nielsen 19'; Faichney 19', 27'; Johnson 49'; Rockliff 56' | Report | Haas 20'; Allnutt 32'; Hinton 39' |

Sydney Olympic Park: Pitch 2
Umpires:
Courtney Pearson (AUS)
Kimberleigh Todd (AUS)

===== Fifth and sixth place =====
11 July 2018
14:20

| NSW B (New South Wales) | 2–1 | (Australian Capital Territory) ACT |
|---|---|---|
| Pickering 24'; Mallon 59' | Report | I. Apps 40' |

Sydney Olympic Park: Pitch 2
Umpires:
Emily Ogden (AUS)
Deborah O'Connell (AUS)

==== First to fourth place classification ====
===== Semi-finals =====
10 July 2018
08:00

| NSW (New South Wales) | 1–1 | (Victoria (state)) VIC |
|---|---|---|
| Schonell 12' | Report | Lawton 25' |
Penalties
| Wilson (penalty shoot-out scored); Arnott (penalty shoot-out scored); Callander (penalty shoot-out scored); Schonell (penalty shoot-out scored) | 4–2 | (penalty shoot-out scored) A. Utri; (penalty shoot-out missed) Colasurdo; (penalty shoot-out scored) Lawton; (penalty shoot-out missed) Lendon |

Sydney Olympic Park: Pitch 1
Umpires:
Tamara Leonard (AUS)
Caroline Davis (AUS)

10 July 2018
10:00

| SA (South Australia) | 0–4 | (Queensland) QLD |
|---|---|---|
| | Report | Greiner 4'; McBurnie 6'; Barrett 45'; Johnson 54' |

Sydney Olympic Park: Pitch 1
Umpires:
Lauren Berndt (AUS)
Cassidy Gallagher (AUS)

===== Third and fourth place =====
11 July 2018
08:00

| VIC (Victoria (state)) | 4–2 | (South Australia) SA |
|---|---|---|
| Colasurdo 13'; A. Utri 16', 50', 56' | Report | Wollstein 48'; Spano 49' |

Sydney Olympic Park: Pitch 1
Umpires:
Lauren Berndt (AUS)
Cassidy Gallagher (AUS)

===== Final =====
11 July 2018
12:20

| NSW (New South Wales) | 2–1 | (Queensland) QLD |
|---|---|---|
| Wilson 12'; Gillard 45' | Report | Smart 34' |

Sydney Olympic Park: Pitch 1
Umpires:
Tamara Leonard (AUS)
Caroline Davis (AUS)

== Statistics ==
=== Final standings ===
| Pos | Team | Pld | W | D | L | GF | GA | GD | Pts | Final Result |
|---|---|---|---|---|---|---|---|---|---|---|
| 1st place, gold medalist(s) | (New South Wales) NSW | 6 | 5 | 1 | 0 | 22 | 7 | +15 | 16 | Gold Medal |
| 2nd place, silver medalist(s) | (Queensland) QLD | 6 | 5 | 0 | 1 | 22 | 3 | +19 | 15 | Silver Medal |
| 3rd place, bronze medalist(s) | (Victoria (state)) VIC | 6 | 2 | 3 | 1 | 10 | 10 | 0 | 9 | Bronze Medal |
| 4 | (South Australia) SA | 6 | 2 | 1 | 3 | 10 | 15 | −5 | 7 | |
| 5 | (New South Wales) NSW B | 6 | 1 | 1 | 4 | 6 | 20 | −14 | 4 | |
| 6 | (Australian Capital Territory) ACT | 6 | 2 | 0 | 4 | 8 | 12 | −4 | 6 | |
| 7 | (Western Australia) WA | 6 | 3 | 1 | 2 | 15 | 9 | +6 | 10 | |
| 8 | (Tasmania) TAS | 6 | 0 | 1 | 5 | 7 | 24 | −17 | 1 | |

Source: Hockey Australia

=== Goalscorers ===
There were 100 goals scored in 24 matches, for an average of 4.17 goals per match.

7 goals

- (Queensland) Rebecca Greiner

6 goals

- (Queensland) Tiana Barrett

5 goals

- (New South Wales) Abigail Wilson
- (Victoria (state)) Aisling Utri

4 goals

- (Western Australia) Sarah Byrnes

3 goals

- (Australian Capital Territory) Ashleigh Deacon
- (New South Wales) Kendall Steel
- (New South Wales) Erin Lidbetter
- (New South Wales) Courtney Schonell
- (South Australia) Hattie Shand
- (South Australia) Michaela Spano
- (South Australia) Katie Wollstein
- (Victoria (state)) Olivia Colasurdo
- (Western Australia) Bree Johnson

2 goals

- (Australian Capital Territory) Isabella Apps
- (New South Wales) Alice Arnott
- (New South Wales) Jade Callander
- (New South Wales) Andrea Gillard
- (New South Wales) Claudia Johnston
- (New South Wales) Lexie Pickering
- (Queensland) Annabelle Johnson
- (Tasmania) Maddison Curtis
- (Tasmania) Madeleine Hinton
- (Western Australia) Ciara Faichney
- (Western Australia) Shanea Tonkin

1 goal

- (Australian Capital Territory) Claudia Apps
- (Australian Capital Territory) Mikayla Evans
- (Australian Capital Territory) Aleisha Price
- (New South Wales) Morgan Blamey
- (New South Wales) Jaime Hemmingway
- (New South Wales) Rebecca Janes
- (New South Wales) Georgina Mallon
- (Queensland) Layla Eleison
- (Queensland) Kendra Fitzpatrick
- (Queensland) Morgan Gallagher
- (Queensland) Morgan Mathison
- (Queensland) Ashlyn McBurnie
- (Queensland) Jemma Punch
- (Queensland) Zoe Smart
- (South Australia) Emma de Broughe
- (Tasmania) Jaslyn Allnutt
- (Tasmania) Molly Haas
- (Tasmania) Eliza Westland
- (Victoria (state)) Olivia Downes
- (Victoria (state)) Amy Lawton
- (Western Australia) Phillipa Morgan
- (Western Australia) Claudia Nielsen
- (Western Australia) Renee Rockliff
- (Western Australia) Jolie Sertorio

Source: Hockey Australia
