= Australia women's national field hockey team results (2021–2025) =

The following article comprises the results of the Hockeyroos, the women's national field hockey team from Australia, from 2021 until 2025. New fixtures can be found on the International Hockey Federation's results portal.

== Match results ==
=== 2021 Results ===
2021 Statistics
Pld	W	WD	D	LD	L	GF	GA	GD	Pts
12	7	0	3	1	1	26	11	+15	25

==== Trans–Tasman Series ====
27 May 2021 Match 1	New Zealand	1–1	Australia	Palmerston North, New Zealand
19:30	Shannon 48'	Report	Malone 26'	Stadium: Massey University

28 May 2021 Match 2	New Zealand	2–2	Australia	Palmerston North, New Zealand
19:30	Smith 11'; Dickins 35'	Report	Kershaw 38'; Williams 55'	Stadium: Massey University

30 May 2021 Match 3	New Zealand	2–2	Australia	Palmerston North, New Zealand
13:00	King 23'; Gunson 41'	Report	M. Fitzpatrick 7'; Malone 58'	Stadium: Massey University

1 June 2021 Match 4	New Zealand	1–3	Australia	Palmerston North, New Zealand
17:30	Merry 39'	Report	Kershaw 8'; Commerford 27'; S. Fitzpatrick 43'	Stadium: Massey University

==== FIH Pro League ====
26 June 2021 Home 7	Australia	2–2 (0–2 p)	New Zealand	Perth, Australia
15:00	Malone 4'; Chalker 5'	Report	Michelsen 11'; Ralph 36'	Stadium: Perth Hockey Stadium
	Penalties
	S. Fitzpatrick (penalty shoot-out missed); Lawton (penalty shoot-out missed); Nobbs (penalty shoot-out missed); Peris (penalty shoot-out missed)		(penalty shoot-out missed) Shannon; (penalty shoot-out missed) Merry; (penalty shoot-out missed) Keddell; (penalty shoot-out scored) Charlton; (penalty shoot-out scored) King

27 June 2021 Home 8	Australia	3–1	New Zealand	Perth, Australia
15:00	S. Fitzpatrick 16'; Squibb 34'; Williams 57'	Report	Merry 4'	Stadium: Perth Hockey Stadium

==== XXXII Olympic Games ====
25 July 2021 Pool B	Australia	3–1	Spain	Tokyo, Japan
10:00	Malone 31'; Chalker 32'; Stewart 37'	Report	Pérez 33'	Stadium: Oi Hockey Stadium

26 July 2021 Pool B	Australia	6–0	China	Tokyo, Japan
12:15	Chalker 16', 22'; Peris 31'; Malone 54'; Kershaw 56'; Stewart 58'	Report		Stadium: Oi Hockey Stadium

28 July 2021 Pool B	Japan	0–1	Australia	Tokyo, Japan
18:30		Report	M. Fitzpatrick 33'	Stadium: Oi Hockey Stadium

29 July 2021 Pool B	New Zealand	0–1	Australia	Tokyo, Japan
21:15		Report	Chalker 34'	Stadium: Oi Hockey Stadium

31 July 2021 Pool B	Argentina	0–2	Australia	Tokyo, Japan
11:45		Report	S. Fitzpatrick 49'; Chalker 59'	Stadium: Oi Hockey Stadium

2 August 2021 Quarter–final	Australia	0–1	India	Tokyo, Japan
12:00		Report	Gurjit 22'	Stadium: Oi Hockey Stadium

=== 2022 Results ===
2022 Statistics
Pld	W	WD	D	LD	L	GF	GA	GD	Pts
16	11	1	2	0	2	35	11	+24	37

==== Trans–Tasman Series ====
10 May 2022 Match 1	New Zealand	2–2	Australia	Auckland, New Zealand
19:05	Tynan 16'; Shannon 42'	Report	Fitzpatrick 47'; Williams 48'	Stadium: National Hockey Centre

12 May 2022 Match 2	New Zealand	1–2	Australia	Auckland, New Zealand
19:05	Shannon 39'	Report	Peris 13', 57'	Stadium: National Hockey Centre

14 May 2022 Match 3	New Zealand	1–2	Australia	Auckland, New Zealand
15:35	Shannon 39'	Report	Tonkin 30'	Stadium: National Hockey Centre

15 May 2022 Match 3	New Zealand	1–2	Australia	Auckland, New Zealand
15:35	Hull 14'	Report	Greiner 23'; Peris 34'	Stadium: National Hockey Centre

==== XV FIH World Cup ====
2 July 2022 Pool D	Australia	2–0	Japan	Terrassa, Spain
21:30	Williams 56'; Malone 60'	Report		Stadium: Estadi Olímpic de Terrassa

5 July 2022 Pool D	Belgium	0–2	Australia	Terrassa, Spain
21:30		Report	Hayes 39'; Greiner 40'	Stadium: Estadi Olímpic de Terrassa

6 July 2022 Pool D	Australia	2–1	South Africa	Terrassa, Spain
21:30	Squibb 8'; Malone 24'	Report	Du Plessis 13'	Stadium: Estadi Olímpic de Terrassa

13 July 2022 Quarter–final	Australia	2–0	Spain	Terrassa, Spain
21:30	Taylor 3', 41'	Report		Stadium: Estadi Olímpic de Terrassa

16 July 2022 Semi–final	Netherlands	1–0	Australia	Terrassa, Spain
18:30	Matla 42'	Report		Stadium: Estadi Olímpic de Terrassa

17 July 2022 Bronze Medal Match	Australia	2–1	Germany	Terrassa, Spain
18:30	Kershaw 49', 56'	Report	Micheel 14'	Stadium: Estadi Olímpic de Terrassa

==== XXII Commonwealth Games ====
30 July 2022 Pool B	Australia	8–0	Kenya	Birmingham, England
14:00	Nobbs 3', 12', 60'; Tonkin 4', 32'; Kershaw 15'; Colwill 25'; Stewart 36'	Report		Stadium: University of Birmingham

31 July 2022 Pool B	South Africa	0–5	Australia	Birmingham, England
21:00		Report	Squibb 3', 48'; Taylor 32'; Kershaw 36'; Nobbs 46'	Stadium: University of Birmingham

2 August 2022 Pool B	New Zealand	0–1	Australia	Birmingham, England
09:00		Report	Nobbs 9'	Stadium: University of Birmingham

3 August 2022 Pool B	Australia	2–0	Scotland	Birmingham, England
09:00	Stewart 28'; Tonkin 47'	Report		Stadium: University of Birmingham

5 August 2022 Semi–final	Australia	1–1 (3–0 p)	India	Birmingham, England
20:15	Greiner 10'	Report	Vandana 49'	Stadium: University of Birmingham
	Penalties
	Malone (penalty shoot-out scored); Nobbs (penalty shoot-out scored); Lawton (penalty shoot-out scored)		(penalty shoot-out missed) Lalremsiami; (penalty shoot-out missed) Neha; (penalty shoot-out missed) Navneet

7 August 2022 Gold Medal Match	England	2–1	Australia	Birmingham, England
15:00	Hunt 22'; Howard 26'	Report	Malone 60'	Stadium: University of Birmingham

=== 2023 Results ===
2023 Statistics
Pld	W	WD	D	LD	L	GF	GA	GD	Pts
25	11	4	3	2	5	46	37	+9	46

==== FIH Pro League (Home Leg) ====
10 February 2023 Home 1	Australia	1–1 (3–1 p)	China	Sydney, Australia
18:40	Malone 29'	Report	Zhang Xin. 23'	Stadium: Sydney Olympic Park
	Penalties
	Colwill (penalty shoot-out scored); Williams (penalty shoot-out scored); Greiner (penalty shoot-out missed); G. Stewart (penalty shoot-out scored)		(penalty shoot-out scored) Ma N. (penalty shoot-out missed) He; (penalty shoot-out missed) Chen Y. (penalty shoot-out missed) Zou

12 February 2023 Home 2	Australia	3–0	Germany	Sydney, Australia
16:40	Malone 24', 24'; G. Stewart 58'	Report		Stadium: Sydney Olympic Park

13 February 2023 Home 3	Australia	2–2 (4–3 p)	China	Sydney, Australia
18:40	Claxton 52'; Peris 57'	Report	Zhong 37'; Gu B. 48'	Stadium: Sydney Olympic Park
	Penalties
	Schonell (penalty shoot-out scored); Malone (penalty shoot-out missed); Peris (penalty shoot-out scored); Nobbs (penalty shoot-out scored); Lawton (penalty shoot-out scored)		(penalty shoot-out scored) Liang; (penalty shoot-out scored) Zhong; (penalty shoot-out missed) Li H. (penalty shoot-out scored) Zou; (penalty shoot-out missed) Liu C.

15 February 2023 Home 4	Australia	3–3 (1–2 p)	Germany	Sydney, Australia
18:40	Fitzpatrick 1'; Peris 22'; Kershaw 54'	Report	Pieper 8'; Fleschütz 46'; Strauss 57'	Stadium: Sydney Olympic Park
	Penalties
	Schonell (penalty shoot-out missed); Kershaw (penalty shoot-out missed); Malone (penalty shoot-out scored); Nobbs (penalty shoot-out missed); Peris (penalty shoot-out missed)		(penalty shoot-out missed) Weidemann; (penalty shoot-out scored) Lorenz; (penalty shoot-out missed) Strauss; (penalty shoot-out scored) Schröder; (penalty shoot-out missed) Huse

28 February 2023 Home 5	Australia	2–0	Argentina	Hobart, Australia
17:10	Cullum-Sanders 2'; Taylor 18'	Report		Stadium: Tasmanian Hockey Centre

1 March 2023 Home 6	Australia	0–0 (1–3 p)	United States	Hobart, Australia
17:10	Cullum-Sanders 2'; Taylor 18'	Report		Stadium: Tasmanian Hockey Centre
	Penalties
	Cullum-Sanders (penalty shoot-out scored); A. Wilson (penalty shoot-out missed); Tonkin (penalty shoot-out missed); Young (penalty shoot-out missed)		(penalty shoot-out missed) Lepage; (penalty shoot-out missed) Golini; (penalty shoot-out scored) Crouse; (penalty shoot-out scored) Sessa; (penalty shoot-out scored) De Vries

3 March 2023 Home 7	Australia	0–1	Argentina	Hobart, Australia
19:10		Report	Von der Heyde 48'	Stadium: Tasmanian Hockey Centre

4 March 2023 Home 8	Australia	2–1	United States	Hobart, Australia
19:10	Colwill 4'; Lawton 58'	Report	Hoffman 22'	Stadium: Tasmanian Hockey Centre

==== China Test Series ====
23 March 2023 Match 1	Australia	0–0	China	Bunbury, Australia
18:00		Report		Stadium: Bunbury Hockey Stadium

25 March 2023 Match 2	Australia	0–2	China	Perth, Australia
16:00		Report	Gu B. 8'; Zhang Xin. 16'	Stadium: Perth Hockey Stadium

26 March 2023 Match 3	Australia	3–4	China	Perth, Australia
16:00	Taylor 2', 36'; Malone 51'	Report	Chen Y. 5'; Gu B. 9'; Liang 43'; Zhong 55'	Stadium: Perth Hockey Stadium

==== FIH Pro League (New Zealand Leg) ====
22 April 2023 Away 1	Australia	0–1	Great Britain	Christchurch, New Zealand
14:10		Report	Ansley 13'	Stadium: Ngā Puna Wai Sports Hub

25 April 2023 Away 2	New Zealand	1–2	Australia	Christchurch, New Zealand
14:10	Shannon 6'	Report	Brooks 49'; A. Wilson 58'	Stadium: Ngā Puna Wai Sports Hub

28 April 2023 Away 3	Great Britain	1–3	Australia	Christchurch, New Zealand
17:10	Howard 10'	Report	Greiner 30', 55'; Taylor 36'	Stadium: Ngā Puna Wai Sports Hub

30 April 2023 Away 4	New Zealand	1–2	Australia	Christchurch, New Zealand
16:40	Merry 14'	Report	Schonell 45', 50'	Stadium: Ngā Puna Wai Sports Hub

==== India Test Series ====
18 May 2023 Match 1	Australia	4–2	India	Adelaide, Australia
18:45	Utri 21'; Fitzpatrick 27'; Arnott 32'; Schonell 35'	Report	Sangita 29'; Sharmila 40'	Stadium: MATE Stadium

20 May 2023 Match 2	Australia	3–2	India	Adelaide, Australia
18:45	T. Stewart 12', 45'; Morgan 38'	Report	Sangita 13'; Gurjit 17'	Stadium: MATE Stadium

21 May 2023 Match 3	Australia	1–1	India	Adelaide, Australia
18:15	Brooks 25'	Report	Grace 42'	Stadium: MATE Stadium

==== FIH Pro League (Europe Leg) ====
8 June 2023 Away 5	Netherlands	7–2	Australia	Eindhoven, Netherlands
19:40	Jansen 12', 22', 58'; Matla 16', 49'; Dicke 29', 48'	Report	Malone 4', 40'	Stadium: HC Oranje-Rood

11 June 2023 Away 6	Netherlands	3–3 (1–2 p)	Australia	Eindhoven, Netherlands
15:10	Verschoor 6'; Jansen 20'; Albers 29'	Report	Peris 15'; Malone 22'; Brooks 28'	Stadium: HC Oranje-Rood
	Penalties
	Matla (penalty shoot-out missed); De Waard (penalty shoot-out scored); Veen (penalty shoot-out missed); Moes (penalty shoot-out missed); Verschoor (penalty shoot-out missed)		(penalty shoot-out missed) Schonell; (penalty shoot-out scored) Malone; (penalty shoot-out scored) Kershaw; (penalty shoot-out missed) Nobbs

16 June 2023 Away 7	Belgium	0–2	Australia	Antwerp, Belgium
20:40		Report	Schonell 8'; Malone 35'	Stadium: Wilrijkse Plein

19 June 2023 Away 8	Belgium	1–1 (2–3 p)	Australia	Antwerp, Belgium
20:40	Vanden Borre 27'	Report	Kershaw 10'	Stadium: Wilrijkse Plein
	Penalties
	Englebert (penalty shoot-out missed); Versavel (penalty shoot-out scored); Rasir (penalty shoot-out scored); Breyne (penalty shoot-out missed); Blockmans (penalty shoot-out missed); Rasir (penalty shoot-out missed)		(penalty shoot-out missed) Kershaw; (penalty shoot-out scored) Malone; (penalty shoot-out scored) Lawton; (penalty shoot-out missed) Nobbs; (penalty shoot-out missed) Peris; (penalty shoot-out scored) Nobbs

==== XII Oceania Cup ====
10 August 2023 Match 1	New Zealand	0–3	Australia	Whangārei, New Zealand
17:05		Report	Colwill 30'; Malone 34'; Peris 34'	Stadium: Northland Hockey Association

12 August 2023 Match 2	New Zealand	1–1	Australia	Whangārei, New Zealand
16:05	Cotter 37'	Report	Malone 51'	Stadium: Northland Hockey Association

13 August 2023 Match 3	New Zealand	2–3	Australia	Whangārei, New Zealand
16:05	Davey 4'; Ralph 37'	Report	Peris 21'; G. Stewart 23'; Schonell 32'	Stadium: Northland Hockey Association

=== 2024 Results ===
2024 Statistics
Pld	W	WD	D	LD	L	GF	GA	GD	Pts
26	13	1	2	1	9	54	42	+12	44

==== FIH Pro League (India Leg) ====
4 February 2024 India Leg	China	3–0	Australia	Bhubaneswar, India
17:30	Yuan 37', 55'; Yu 39'	Report		Stadium: Kalinga Stadium

6 February 2024 India Leg	United States	0–3	Australia	Bhubaneswar, India
19:30		Report	T. Stewart 7'; Kershaw 23'; G. Stewart 37'	Stadium: Kalinga Stadium

7 February 2024 India Leg	India	0–3	Australia	Bhubaneswar, India
19:30		Report	G. Stewart 19'; T. Stewart 23'; Nobbs 55'	Stadium: Kalinga Stadium

9 February 2024 India Leg	Netherlands	6–2	Australia	Bhubaneswar, India
17:30	Veen 7', 49', 49'; Matla 9'; Jansen 20', 39'	Report	T. Stewart 28'; G. Stewart 52'	Stadium: Kalinga Stadium

14 February 2024 India Leg	Australia	2–0	China	Rourkela, India
17:30	G. Stewart 29'; Kershaw 57'	Report		Stadium: Birsa Munda International Hockey Stadium

15 February 2024 India Leg	Australia	4–0	United States	Rourkela, India
13:30	Brooks 21'; Greiner 30'; Colwill 44'; Colwill 44'	Report		Stadium: Birsa Munda International Hockey Stadium

17 February 2024 India Leg	India	1–0	Australia	Rourkela, India
19:30	Vandana 34'	Report		Stadium: Birsa Munda International Hockey Stadium

18 February 2024 India Leg	Australia	1–3	Netherlands	Rourkela, India
17:30	Kershaw 20'	Report	Jansen 2', 13', 14'	Stadium: Birsa Munda International Hockey Stadium

==== International Festival of Hockey ====
20 April 2024 Test Match	Australia	1–0	Japan	Perth, Australia
16:40	Williams 60'	Report		Stadium: Perth Hockey Stadium

21 April 2024 Test Match	China	2–2	Australia	Perth, Australia
16:40	Zou 22'; Chen Ya. 22'	Report	Hayes 38'; Kershaw 53'	Stadium: Perth Hockey Stadium

24 April 2024 Test Match	Australia	2–3	China	Perth, Australia
17:40	Malone 16'; Brooks 18'	Report	Chen Yi 15'; Chen Ya. 46'; Zou 58'	Stadium: Perth Hockey Stadium

28 April 2024 Test Match	Japan	0–3	Australia	Perth, Australia
16:40		Report	Colwill 12'; Malone 42'; Brooks 51'	Stadium: Perth Hockey Stadium

==== FIH Pro League (Europe Leg) ====
29 May 2024 Belgium Leg	Belgium	2–2 (3–2 p)	Australia	Antwerp, Belgium
16:30	Vanden Borre 19'; Gerniers 60'	Report	Claxton 8'; Peris 57'	Stadium: Wilrijkse Plein
	Penalties
	Versavel (penalty shoot-out missed); Englebert (penalty shoot-out scored); Blockmans (penalty shoot-out scored); Ballenghien (penalty shoot-out missed); Breyne (penalty shoot-out missed); Englebert (penalty shoot-out scored)		(penalty shoot-out missed) Peris; (penalty shoot-out scored) Kershaw; (penalty shoot-out scored) Malone; (penalty shoot-out missed) Nobbs; (penalty shoot-out missed) Lawton; (penalty shoot-out missed) Peris

30 May 2024 Belgium Leg	Australia	0–5	Argentina	Antwerp, Belgium
14:15		Report	Antoniazzi 21'; Casas 41'; Granatto 46'; Trinchinetti 50'; Gorzelany 54'	Stadium: Wilrijkse Plein

1 June 2024 Belgium Leg	Argentina	0–1	Australia	Antwerp, Belgium
11:45		Report	Squibb 47'	Stadium: Wilrijkse Plein

2 June 2024 Belgium Leg	Belgium	2–1	Australia	Antwerp, Belgium
14:00	Gerniers 28'; Bonami 50'	Report	Arnott 17'	Stadium: Wilrijkse Plein

8 June 2024 Great Britain Leg	Great Britain	0–3	Australia	London, United Kingdom
12:15		Report	Peris 22'; Greiner 39', 45'	Stadium: Lee Valley Hockey and Tennis Centre

9 June 2024 Great Britain Leg	Germany	2–2 (3–4 p)	Australia	London, United Kingdom
10:00	Granitzki 36'; Lorenz 39'	Report	Stewart 45'; Claxton 51'	Stadium: Lee Valley Hockey and Tennis Centre
	Penalties
	Weidemann (penalty shoot-out scored); Wenzel (penalty shoot-out scored); Strauss (penalty shoot-out missed); Zimmermann (penalty shoot-out scored); Lorenz (penalty shoot-out missed)		(penalty shoot-out scored) Kershaw; (penalty shoot-out missed) Peris; (penalty shoot-out scored) Williams; (penalty shoot-out scored) Lawton; (penalty shoot-out scored) Nobbs

11 June 2024 Great Britain Leg	Australia	2–3	Germany	London, United Kingdom
17:45	Arnott 52'; Kershaw 56'	Report	Stapenhorst 3'; Lorenz 36'; Nolte 39'	Stadium: Lee Valley Hockey and Tennis Centre

12 June 2024 Great Britain Leg	Great Britain	2–3	Australia	London, United Kingdom
20:00	Balsdon 5'; Howard 39'	Report	G. Stewart 20'; Peris 30'; Malone 52'	Stadium: Lee Valley Hockey and Tennis Centre

==== XXXIII Olympic Games ====
28 July 2024 Pool B	Australia	2–1	South Africa	Paris, France
12:45	Kershaw 16'; T. Stewart 40'	Report	De Waal 14'	Stadium: Stade Yves-du-Manoir

29 July 2024 Pool B	Great Britain	0–4	Australia	Paris, France
17:00		Report	Greiner 17'; Arnott 19'; T. Stewart 46'; G. Stewart 52'	Stadium: Stade Yves-du-Manoir

31 July 2024 Pool B	Australia	3–0	United States	Paris, France
13:15	Taylor 3'; Arnott 29'; Brooks 53'	Report		Stadium: Stade Yves-du-Manoir

1 August 2024 Pool B	Argentina	3–3	Australia	Paris, France
20:15	Casas 10'; Sauze 10'; Granatto 50'	Report	Nobbs 37'; Kershaw 45+'; Williams 60'	Stadium: Stade Yves-du-Manoir

3 August 2024 Pool B	Australia	3–1	Spain	Paris, France
12:45	Arnott 2'; Kershaw 55'; Nobbs 59'	Report	Riera 43'	Stadium: Stade Yves-du-Manoir

5 August 2024 Quarter-final	Australia	2–3	China	Paris, France
10:00				Stadium: Stade Yves-du-Manoir

=== 2025 Results ===
2025 Statistics
Pld	W	WD	D	LD	L	GF	GA	GD	Pts
22	9	1	0	1	11	33	44	–11	30

==== FIH Pro League ====
5 February 2025 Australia Leg	Australia	4–1	Spain	Sydney, Australia
19:30	J. Smith 8'; Squibb 35'; Schonell 40'; Williams 59'	Report	Álvarez 24'	Stadium: Sydney Olympic Park

6 February 2025 Australia Leg	Australia	2–2 (2–1 p)	China	Sydney, Australia
19:30	Colwill 15'; Schonell 16'	Report	Tan J. 28', 56'	Stadium: Sydney Olympic Park
	Penalties
	Hayes (penalty shoot-out missed); Wilson (penalty shoot-out missed); Young (penalty shoot-out scored); Schonell (penalty shoot-out scored)		(penalty shoot-out missed) Ou; (penalty shoot-out scored) Liu C. (penalty shoot-out missed) Li H. (penalty shoot-out missed) Zou; (penalty shoot-out missed) Chen Yi

8 February 2025 Australia Leg	Australia	3–1	Spain	Sydney, Australia
19:30	J. Smith 10'; Hayes 40'; Young 49'	Report	Rogoski 14'	Stadium: Sydney Olympic Park

9 February 2025 Australia Leg	Australia	1–3	China	Sydney, Australia
19:30	Squibb 21'	Report	Yu 14'; Hao 17'; Li H. 20'	Stadium: Sydney Olympic Park

20 February 2025 Argentina Leg	Argentina	2–1	Australia	Santiago del Estero, Argentina
21:30	Bruggesser 7'; Gorzelany 14'	Report	J. Smith 48'	Stadium: Polideportivo Provincial

21 February 2025 Argentina Leg	Australia	1–2	Belgium	Santiago del Estero, Argentina
21:30	Williams 55'	Report	Ballenghien 16', 43'	Stadium: Polideportivo Provincial

23 February 2025 Argentina Leg	Argentina	2–1	Australia	Santiago del Estero, Argentina
21:30	Gorzelany 6'; Bruggesser 22'	Report	J. Smith 5'	Stadium: Polideportivo Provincial

24 February 2025 Argentina Leg	Belgium	3–2	Australia	Santiago del Estero, Argentina
21:30		Report		Stadium: Polideportivo Provincial

==== India Practice Matches ====
1 May 2025 Unofficial Practice Match	Australia	2–0	India	Perth, Australia
17:10	Schonell 9'; G. Stewart 52'	Report		Stadium: Perth Hockey Stadium

3 May 2025 Unofficial Practice Match	Australia	3–2	India	Perth, Australia
17:40	G. Stewart 2'; J. Smith 36'; Hayes 42'	Report	Navneet 35'; Lalremsiami 59'	Stadium: Perth Hockey Stadium

4 May 2025 Unofficial Practice Match	Australia	0–1	India	Perth, Australia
17:40		Report	Lalremsiami 21'	Stadium: Perth Hockey Stadium

==== FIH Pro League ====
7 June 2025 Europe Leg	Netherlands	8–1	Australia	Amsterdam, Netherlands
13:30	Y. Jansen 2', 43', 47'; Sanders 3'; Veen 45'; Burg 46'; Matla 54'; Fokke 58'	Report	Williams 31'	Stadium: Wagener Stadium

8 June 2025 Europe Leg	Netherlands	5–1	Australia	Amsterdam, Netherlands
14:30	Veen 13'; Van den Heuvel 21'; Y. Jansen 30', 42'; Albers 48'	Report	Arnott 7'	Stadium: Wagener Stadium

14 June 2025 Europe Leg	Australia	3–2	India	London, England
11:00	Schonell 16'; Pickering 22'; T. Stewart 35'	Report	Deepika 44'; Neha 52'	Stadium: Lee Valley Hockey Stadium

15 June 2025 Europe Leg	India	1–2	Australia	London, England
10:30	Vaishnavi 3'	Report	Lawton 37'; Pickering 60'	Stadium: Lee Valley Hockey Stadium

17 June 2025 Europe Leg	England	1–0	Australia	London, England
11:00	Manton 10'	Report		Stadium: Lee Valley Hockey Stadium

18 June 2025 Europe Leg	England	0–3	Australia	London, England
17:45		Report	J. Smith 26'; G. Stewart 44'; Hayes 50'	Stadium: Lee Valley Hockey Stadium

21 June 2025 Europe Leg	Germany	4–0	Australia	Berlin, Germany
15:00		Report		Stadium: Ernst Reuter Sportfeld

22 June 2025 Europe Leg	Germany	3–4	Australia	Berlin, Germany
11:00		Report		Stadium: Ernst Reuter Sportfeld

==== Oceania Cup ====
4 September 2025 Match 1	Australia	0–1	New Zealand	Darwin, Australia
20:10		Report	Shannon 49'	Stadium: Marrara Hockey Centre

6 September 2025 Match 2	Australia	1–0	New Zealand	Darwin, Australia
14:10	Williams 56'	Report		Stadium: Marrara Hockey Centre

7 September 2025 Match 3	Australia	1–1 (3–5 p)	New Zealand	Darwin, Australia
14:10	Mathison 29'	Report	Anderson 53'	Stadium: Marrara Hockey Centre
	Penalties
	Arnott (penalty shoot-out missed); Hayes (penalty shoot-out scored); Williams (penalty shoot-out scored); Lawton (penalty shoot-out scored)		(penalty shoot-out scored) Shannon; (penalty shoot-out scored) H. Cotter; (penalty shoot-out scored) Pho; (penalty shoot-out scored) Murray; (penalty shoot-out scored) Shannon
