= 2016 Under 21 Women's Australian Hockey Championships =

2016 Women's Under 21 Australian Championships
Tournament details
- Host country: Australia
- City: Sydney
- Teams: 8
- Venue: Sydney Olympic Park

Final positions
- Champions: Queensland
- Runner-up: Western Australia
- Third place: New South Wales

Tournament statistics
- Matches played: 24
- Goals scored: 114 (4.75 per match)
- Top scorer: (Victoria (state)) Aisling Utri (7 goals)

The 2016 Women's Under 21 Australian Championships was a women's field hockey tournament held in the New South Wales city of Sydney.

The Queensland Under 21 team won the gold medal after defeating the Western Australia Under 21 team 2–1 in the final. New South Wales won the bronze medal by defeating Victoria 4–3 in a penalty shoot-out following a 3–3 draw.

== Competition format ==
The tournament is divided into two pools, Pool A and Pool B, consisting of four teams in a round robin format. Teams then progress into either Pool C, the medal round, or Pool D, the classification round. Teams carry over points from their previous match ups, and contest teams they have yet to play.

The top two teams in each of pools A and B then progress to Pool C. The top two teams in Pool C continue to contest the Final, while the bottom two teams of Pool C play in the Third and Fourth place match.

The remaining bottom placing teams make up Pool D. The top two teams in Pool D play in the Fifth and Sixth place match, while the bottom two teams of Pool C play in the Seventh and Eighth place match.

== Teams ==
- Australian Capital Territory
- (Australia) East Coast Venom
- New South Wales
- Queensland
- South Australia
- Tasmania
- (Victoria (state)) Victoria
- Western Australia

== Results ==
=== First round ===
==== Pool A ====
Pos	Team	Pld	W	D	L	GF	GA	GD	Pts	Qualification
1	(Victoria (state)) VIC	3	2	1	0	14	5	+9	7	Medal round
2	(Western Australia) WA	3	2	1	0	7	3	+4	7	Medal round
3	(Australia) ECV	3	1	0	2	7	11	−4	3	
4	(Australian Capital Territory) ACT	3	0	0	3	4	13	−9	0	

Source: Hockey Australia

10 April 2016
10:00

WA (Western Australia)	2–1	(Australia) ECV
Collard 12'; Archer 46'	Report	Radcliffe 50'

Sydney Olympic Park
Umpires:
Angela May (AUS)
Tamara Leonard (AUS)

10 April 2016
12:00

VIC (Victoria (state))	6–1	(Australian Capital Territory) ACT
Colasurdo 9'; Utri 10', 13', 17'; Ratcliffe 18'; Down 35'	Report	Deacon 6'

Sydney Olympic Park
Umpires:
Kerryl Chandler (AUS)
Carrie Born (AUS)

11 April 2016
10:30

VIC (Victoria (state))	6–2	(Australia) ECV
Hammond 4'; Down 24'; S. Taylor 39', 52'; Utri 47'; Thompson 56'	Report	Martin 10'; Radcliffe 41'

Sydney Olympic Park
Umpires:
Emma Cairnduff (AUS)
Leonie Young (AUS)

11 April 2016
12:30

WA (Western Australia)	3–0	(Australian Capital Territory) ACT
Nelson 6', 9'; Tonkin 24'	Report

Sydney Olympic Park
Umpires:
Kylie Seymour (AUS)
Keeley O'Reilly (AUS)

13 April 2016
12:00

ECV (Australia)	4–3	(Australian Capital Territory) ACT
Steel 5'; Gasmier 6'; Hardy 13'; Ferguson 40'	Report	Gray 3'; Taseska 47'; Evans 50'

Sydney Olympic Park
Umpires:
Caroline Davis (AUS)
Deborah O'Connell (AUS)

13 April 2016
16:00

VIC (Victoria (state))	2–2	(Western Australia) WA
Ratcliffe 6'; Down 45'	Report	Delborrello 27'; Rogers-Uff 45'

Sydney Olympic Park
Umpires:
Kylie Seymour (AUS)
Angela May (AUS)

==== Pool B ====
Pos	Team	Pld	W	D	L	GF	GA	GD	Pts	Qualification
1	(Queensland) QLD	3	3	0	0	14	3	+11	9	Medal round
2	(New South Wales) NSW	3	2	0	1	10	3	+7	6	Medal round
3	(Tasmania) TAS	3	1	0	2	2	16	−14	3	
4	(South Australia) SA	3	0	0	3	3	7	−4	0	

Source: Hockey Australia

10 April 2016
14:00

QLD (Queensland)	3–2	(South Australia) SA
Wilkinson 16'; Malone 47'; Day 54'	Report	Spano 27'; Harkness 44'

Sydney Olympic Park
Umpires:
Emma Cairnduff (AUS)
Caroline Davis (AUS)

10 April 2016
16:00

NSW (New South Wales)	7–0	(Tasmania) TAS
Danckert 18'; Rekunow 26', 51'; Birmingham 36'; Wilson 37', 38'; Hanagan 56'	Report

Sydney Olympic Park
Umpires:
Deborah O'Connell (AUS)
Keeley O'Reilly (AUS)

11 April 2016
14:30

QLD (Queensland)	8–0	(Tasmania) TAS
Eleison 8'; Barrett 10'; R. Taylor 24', 43'; Greiner 31'; Fitzpatrick 40', 55'; Emblem 57'	Report

Sydney Olympic Park
Umpires:
Tamara Leonard (AUS)
Caroline Davis (AUS)

11 April 2016
16:30

NSW (New South Wales)	2–0	(South Australia) SA
Danckert 44'; Simpson 56'	Report

Sydney Olympic Park
Umpires:
Carrie Born (AUS)
Deborah O'Connell (AUS)

13 April 2016
10:00

SA (South Australia)	1–2	(Tasmania) TAS
MacLachlan 48'	Report	Arthur 37'; O'Conor 44'

Sydney Olympic Park
Umpires:
Keeley O'Reilly (AUS)
Leonie Young (AUS)

13 April 2016
14:00

NSW (New South Wales)	1–3	(Queensland) QLD
Simpson 20'	Report	R. Taylor 2', 53'; Greiner 11'

Sydney Olympic Park
Umpires:
Kerryl Chandler (AUS)
Tamara Leonard (AUS)

=== Second round ===
==== Pool C (medal round) ====
Pos	Team	Pld	W	D	L	GF	GA	GD	Pts
1	(Queensland) QLD	3	2	0	1	8	3	+5	6
2	(Western Australia) WA	3	1	2	0	4	3	+1	5
3	(Victoria (state)) VIC	3	1	1	1	5	8	−3	4
4	(New South Wales) NSW	3	0	1	2	3	6	−3	1

Source: Hockey Australia

14 April 2016
14:30

WA (Western Australia)	0–0	(New South Wales) NSW
	Report

Sydney Olympic Park
Umpires:
Carrie Born (AUS)
Leonie Young (AUS)

14 April 2016
16:30

VIC (Victoria (state))	0–4	(Queensland) QLD
	Report	Malone 5'; Ferguson 12'; Greiner 47'; Wilkinson 48'

Sydney Olympic Park
Umpires:
Kylie Seymour (AUS)
Emma Cairnduff (AUS)

16 April 2016
14:00

QLD (Queensland)	1–2	(Western Australia) WA
R. Taylor 37'	Report	Collard 35'; Peacock 51'

Sydney Olympic Park
Umpires:
Caroline Davis (AUS)
Tamara Leonard (AUS)

16 April 2016
16:00

VIC (Victoria (state))	3–2	(New South Wales) NSW
Utri 34', 40', 51'	Report	Blamey 21'; Gillard 35'

Sydney Olympic Park
Umpires:
Kerryl Chandler (AUS)
Leonie Young (AUS)

==== Pool D (classification round) ====
Pos	Team	Pld	W	D	L	GF	GA	GD	Pts
1	(South Australia) SA	3	2	0	1	8	3	+5	6
2	(Tasmania) TAS	3	2	0	1	7	5	+2	6
3	(Australian Capital Territory) ACT	3	1	0	2	6	9	−3	3
4	(Australia) ECV	3	1	0	2	6	10	−4	3

Source: Hockey Australia

14 April 2016
10:30

ACT (Australian Capital Territory)	0–3	(South Australia) SA
	Report	Spano 4'; Busiko 11'; Draper 28'

Sydney Olympic Park
Umpires:
Keeley O'Reilly (AUS)
Angela May (AUS)

14 April 2016
12:30

ECV (Australia)	1–3	(Tasmania) TAS
Hardy 14'	Report	O'Conor 21', 44'; Arthur 23'

Sydney Olympic Park
Umpires:
Deborah O'Connell (AUS)
Kerryl Chandler (AUS)

16 April 2016
10:00

TAS (Tasmania)	2–3	(Australian Capital Territory) ACT
O'Conor 47', 51'	Report	Evans 2', 39'; Taseska 57'

Sydney Olympic Park
Umpires:
Keeley O'Reilly (AUS)
Emma Cairnduff (AUS)

16 April 2016
12:00

ECV (Australia)	1–4	(South Australia) SA
Martin 52'	Report	Divall 8', 41'; Harkness 24'; Spano 42'

Sydney Olympic Park
Umpires:
Carrie Born (AUS)
Angela May (AUS)

=== Classification matches ===
==== Seventh and eighth place ====
17 April 2016
10:00

ACT (Australian Capital Territory)	4–5	(Australia) ECV
Price 24'; Deacon 27', 28'; Gray 33'	Report	Martin 3', 22'; Wollstein 7', 60'; Radcliffe 35'

Sydney Olympic Park
Umpires:
Keeley O'Reilly (AUS)
Deborah O'Connell (AUS)

==== Fifth and sixth place ====
17 April 2016
14:00

SA (South Australia)	5–1	(Tasmania) TAS
Appleyard 4', 35'; Gibbs 6'; MacLachlan 21'; Divall 23'	Report	Murphy 13'

Sydney Olympic Park
Umpires:
Carrie Born (AUS)
Caroline Davis (AUS)

==== Third and fourth place ====
17 April 2016
11:00

VIC (Victoria (state))	3–3	(New South Wales) NSW
Thompson 11'; Bates 19'; Down 25'	Report	Arnott 32', 43', 60+'
Penalties
Bates (penalty shoot-out scored); Colasurdo (penalty shoot-out scored); Ratcliffe (penalty shoot-out scored); Kleinschmidt (penalty shoot-out missed); Utri (penalty shoot-out missed)	3–4	(penalty shoot-out scored) Hanna; (penalty shoot-out missed) Wilson; (penalty shoot-out scored) Gillard; (penalty shoot-out scored) Hayes; (penalty shoot-out scored) Nobbs

Sydney Olympic Park
Umpires:
Tamara Leonard (AUS)
Emma Cairnduff (AUS)

==== Final ====
17 April 2016
16:00

QLD (Queensland)	2–1	(Western Australia) WA
R. Taylor 38'; Malone 54'	Report	Capewell 58'

Sydney Olympic Park
Umpires:
Kerryl Chandler (AUS)
Leonie Young (AUS)

== Statistics ==
=== Final standings ===
Pos	Team	Pld	W	D	L	GF	GA	GD	Pts	Final result
1st place, gold medalist(s)	(Queensland) QLD	6	5	0	1	21	6	+15	15	Gold medal
2nd place, silver medalist(s)	(Western Australia) QA	6	3	2	1	10	6	+4	11	Silver medal
3rd place, bronze medalist(s)	(New South Wales) NSW	6	2	2	2	15	9	+6	8	Bronze medal
4	(Victoria (state)) VIC	6	3	2	1	20	14	+6	11	Fourth place
5	(South Australia) SA	6	3	0	3	15	9	+6	9	Fifth place
6	(Tasmania) TAS	6	2	0	4	8	25	−17	6	Sixth place
7	(Australia) ECV	6	2	0	4	14	22	−8	6	Seventh place
8	(Australian Capital Territory) ACT	6	1	0	5	11	23	−12	3	Eighth place

=== Goalscorers ===
There were 114 goals scored in 24 matches, for an average of 4.75 goals per match.

7 goals

- (Victoria (state)) Aisling Utri

6 goals

- (Queensland) Renee Taylor

5 goals

- (Tasmania) Camille O'Conor

4 goals

- (Australia) Veronica Martin
- (Victoria (state)) Sarah Down

3 goals

- (Australian Capital Territory) Ashleigh Deacon
- (Australian Capital Territory) Mikayla Evans
- (New South Wales) Alice Arnott
- (Australia) Georgie Radcliffe
- (Queensland) Rebecca Greiner
- (Queensland) Ambrosia Malone
- (South Australia) Rachel Divall
- (South Australia) Michaela Spano

2 goals

- (Australian Capital Territory) Laura Gray
- (Australian Capital Territory) Tina Taseska
- (Australia) Cori Hardy
- (Australia) Katie Wollstein
- (New South Wales) Samantha Danckert
- (New South Wales) Katrina Rekunow
- (New South Wales) Molly Simpson
- (New South Wales) Abigail Wilson
- (Queensland) Savannah Fitzpatrick
- (Queensland) Britt Wilkinson
- (South Australia) Linzi Appleyard
- (South Australia) Amelia Harkness
- (South Australia) Euleena MacLachlan
- (Tasmania) Ashleigh Arthur
- (Victoria (state)) Madeleine Ratcliffe
- (Victoria (state)) Sophie Taylor
- (Victoria (state)) Sophie Thompson
- (Western Australia) Taylor Collard
- (Western Australia) Matilda Nelson

1 goal

- (Australian Capital Territory) Aleisha Price
- (Australia) Genevieve Feguson
- (Australia) Sarah Gasmier
- (Australia) Kendall Steel
- (New South Wales) Brianna Birmingham
- (New South Wales) Morgan Blamey
- (New South Wales) Andrea Gillard
- (New South Wales) Alley Hanagan
- (Queensland) Tiana Barrett
- (Queensland) Caitlin Day
- (Queensland) Layla Eleison
- (Queensland) Jade Emblem
- (Queensland) Aleesa Ferguson
- (South Australia) Anna Busiko
- (South Australia) Claudia Draper
- (South Australia) Annie Gibbs
- (Tasmania) Madeleine Murphy
- (Victoria (state)) Kristina Bates
- (Victoria (state)) Olivia Colasurdo
- (Victoria (state)) Nicola Hammond
- (Western Australia) Sienna Archer
- (Western Australia) Brooke Capewell
- (Western Australia) Natasha Delborrello
- (Western Australia) Candyce Peacock
- (Western Australia) Sage Rogers-Uff
- (Western Australia) Shanea Tonkin

Source: Hockey Australia
