= 2018 Women's Australian Hockey League =

Tournament details
- Host country: Australia
- City: Gold Coast (finals venue)
- Dates: 6 – 28 October
- Teams: 8
- Venue: 9 (in 9 host cities)

Final positions
- Champions: (New South Wales) NSW Arrows (10th title)
- Runner-up: (Queensland) QLD Scorchers
- Third place: (Australian Capital Territory) Canberra Strikers

Tournament statistics
- Matches played: 24
- Goals scored: 155 (6.46 per match)
- Top scorer(s): (Queensland) Rebecca Greiner (Queensland) Jodie Kenny (Victoria (state)) Emily Hurtz (9 goals)
- Best player: (Australian Capital Territory) Elena Tice (Victoria (state)) Lily Brazel
- Best goalkeeper: (Victoria (state)) Rachael Lynch

The 2018 Women's Australian Hockey League was the 26th edition of the women's field hockey tournament. The 2018 edition of the tournament was held between 6 – 28 October, and featured a new format from previous editions.

The finals phase of the 2018 tournament was held in the Queensland city of the Gold Coast, from the 25 – 28 October.

NSW Arrows won the tournament for the tenth time, after defeating the QLD Scorchers 7–6 in the gold medal match. Canberra Strikers won the bronze medal after defeating VIC Vipers 2–0 in a penalty shoot-out following a 4–4 draw.

== Competition format ==
Unlike previous editions of the Women's Australian Hockey League, the 2018 edition will include a very different format. Instead of the tournament being held at a single venue, the teams will play at least one home and away match during the pool stage, before converging on a singular venue for the Classification Round.

The teams will be divided into two Pool A and Pool B, both consisting of four teams, with each team playing each other once. The teams will then progress to the Classification round, with each team playing a qualifying match, before progressing to either the fifth to eighth place playoffs, or the first to fourth place playoffs.

== Rule Innovations ==
As well as a new format, the 2018 AHL brought in new rule innovations from standard international hockey.

=== Field Goal Conversions ===
When a field goal is scored the same athlete will have an automatic one-on-one shootout with the goalkeeper for an extra goal.

=== Power Plays ===
Each team possesses a five-minute Power Play to use at the end of either the second or fourth quarters, when teams are reduced to nine players each and where that team’s goals are worth double.

The allocation of Power Plays will be decided by the team which wins a pre-game coin toss. For example, if the coin toss winner elects to take their Power Play at end of the fourth quarter, the opposition must use at theirs at the end of the second quarter.

In the second and fourth quarters, the clock is initially set for 10 minutes, then re-set for a further five minutes for the Power Play. Play will re-commence with a centre pass taken by the team in possession of the Power Play.

=== Point Allocation ===
All matches must have an outright result so drawn matches will be decided in a penalty shoot-out. Match points will be as follows:

· 5 points for a win
· 2 points to each team in the event of a draw
· 1 point will be awarded to the winner of the shoot-out
· 0 points to the loser of the match

== Participating teams ==
- (Australian Capital Territory) Canberra Strikers
- (New South Wales) NSW Arrows
- (Northern Territory) NT Pearls
- (Queensland) QLD Scorchers
- (South Australia) SA Suns
- (Tasmania) Tassie Van Demons
- (Victoria (state)) VIC Vipers
- (Western Australia) WA Diamonds

== Venues ==
Sydney	Melbourne	Perth
Sydney Olympic Park	State Netball and Hockey Centre	Perth Hockey Stadium
Capacity: 8,000	Capacity: 8,000	Capacity: 6,000
Adelaide	2018 Women's Australian Hockey League is located in Australia	
State Hockey Centre	2018 Women's Australian Hockey League is located in Australia	
Capacity: 4,000	2018 Women's Australian Hockey League is located in Australia	
Brisbane	2018 Women's Australian Hockey League is located in Australia	
Queensland State Hockey Centre	2018 Women's Australian Hockey League is located in Australia	
Capacity: 1,000	2018 Women's Australian Hockey League is located in Australia	
Canberra	Hobart	Darwin
National Hockey Centre	Tasmanian Hockey Centre	Marrara Hockey Centre
Gold Coast
Finals Venue: Gold Coast Hockey Centre

== Results ==
=== Preliminary round ===
==== Pool A ====
Pos	Team	Pld	W	WD	LD	L	GF	GA	GD	Pts
1	(Queensland) QLD Scorchers	3	2	0	0	1	23	6	+17	10
2	(New South Wales) NSW Arrows	3	2	0	0	1	13	6	+7	10
3	(Australian Capital Territory) Canberra Strikers	3	2	0	0	1	6	5	+1	10
4	(Tasmania) Tassie Van Demons	3	0	0	0	3	1	26	−25	0

Source: Hockey Australia

6 October 2018
14:00 (AEST)

NSW Arrows (New South Wales)	5–3	(Queensland) QLD Scorchers
Smith 4', 4'; Watterson 38'; Stewart 50', 50'	Report	Kenny 27'; Greiner 58', 58'

Sydney Olympic Park, Sydney
Umpires:
Kylie Seymour (AUS)
Michelle Farnill (AUS)

6 October 2018
17:30 (AEST)

Tassie Van Demons (Tasmania)	0–3	(Australian Capital Territory) Canberra Strikers
	Report	Evans 12'; M. Bone 55', 56'

Tasmanian Hockey Centre, Hobart
Umpires:
Kerryl Chandler (AUS)
Kristy Robertson (AUS)

14 October 2018
13:00 (AEST)

Tassie Van Demons (Tasmania)	1–8	(New South Wales) NSW Arrows
Lawrence 60'	Report	Watterson 13', 13'; Jenner 26'; Stewart 30', 30', 55', 55'; Johnston 54'

Tasmanian Hockey Centre, Hobart
Umpires:
Caroline Davis (AUS)
Michelle Farnill (AUS)

14 October 2018
13:00 (AEST)

Canberra Strikers (Australian Capital Territory)	1–5	(Queensland) QLD Scorchers
Taseska 10'	Report	Taylor 22', 40'; Greiner 60', 60', 60'

National Hockey Centre, Canberra
Umpires:
Kerryl Chandler (AUS)
Emily Carroll (AUS)

20 October 2018
14:00 (AEST)

Canberra Strikers (Australian Capital Territory)	2–0	(New South Wales) NSW Arrows
Middleton 28', 28'	Report

National Hockey Centre, Canberra
Umpires:
Emily Carroll (AUS)
Kristy Robertson (AUS)

20 October 2018
18:00 (AEST)

QLD Scorchers (Queensland)	15–0	(Tasmania) Tassie Van Demons
Kershaw 3', 3'; Malone 10', 10', 27', 27', 27', 46', 46'; Greiner 23', 23'; Kenny 28', 28', 28'; Holzberger 39'	Report

Queensland State Hockey Centre, Brisbane
Umpires:
Aleisha Neumann (AUS)
Tamara Leonard (AUS)

==== Pool B ====
Pos	Team	Pld	W	WD	LD	L	GF	GA	GD	Pts
1	(Victoria (state)) VIC Vipers	3	3	0	0	0	15	0	+15	15
2	(South Australia) SA Suns	3	2	0	0	1	6	3	+3	10
3	(Western Australia) WA Diamonds	3	1	0	0	2	7	5	+2	5
4	(Northern Territory) NT Pearls	3	0	0	0	3	1	21	−20	0

Source: Hockey Australia

7 October 2018
14:00 (ACST)

SA Suns (South Australia)	3–2	(Western Australia) WA Diamonds
Welstead 28', 28', 28'	Report	Rogers-Uff 41'; Tonkin 54'

State Hockey Centre, Adelaide
Umpires:
Nicola Brown (AUS)
Melissa Trivic (AUS)

7 October 2018
17:00 (ACST)

NT Pearls (Northern Territory)	0–13	(Victoria (state)) VIC Vipers
	Report	Utri 7', 42', 42'; Brazel 7'; Hurtz 11', 15', 44', 44'; Gravenall 30'; Ratcliffe 30', 40', 40'; Hammond 45'

Marrara Hockey Centre, Darwin
Umpires:
Bernadette Pangrazio (AUS)
Lauren Berndt (AUS)

13 October 2018
15:45 (AEST)

VIC Vipers (Victoria (state))	1–0	(Western Australia) WA Diamonds
Ratcliffe 60'	Report

State Netball Hockey Centre, Melbourne
Umpires:
Nicola Brown (AUS)
Cassigy Gallagher (AUS)

13 October 2018
17:00 (ACST)

SA Suns (South Australia)	3–0	(Northern Territory) NT Pearls
McMahon 30', 30', 41'	Report

State Hockey Centre, Adelaide
Umpires:
Tamara Leonard (AUS)
Aleisha Neumann (AUS)

20 October 2018
16:00 (AWST)

WA Diamonds (Western Australia)	5–1	(Northern Territory) NT Pearls
Squibb 40', 40', 56', 56'; Slattery 43'	Report	Martin-Brown 8'

Perth Hockey Stadium, Perth
Umpires:
Melissa Trivic (AUS)
Kimberleigh Todd (AUS)

21 October 2018
14:00 (AEST)

VIC Vipers (Victoria (state))	1–0	(South Australia) SA Suns
Gravenall 45'	Report

State Netball Hockey Centre, Melbourne
Umpires:
Michelle Farnill (AUS)
Nicola Brown (AUS)

=== Classification round ===
Quarterfinals
25 October 2018
(Queensland) QLD Scorchers	13
(Northern Territory) NT Pearls	0
25 October 2018
(South Australia) SA Suns	0 (2)
(Australian Capital Territory) Canberra Strikers (p.s.o)	0 (4)
25 October 2018
(New South Wales) NSW Arrows	6
(Western Australia) WA Diamonds	0
25 October 2018
(Victoria (state)) VIC Vipers	6
(Tasmania) Tassie Van Demons	0

Semi-finals
27 October 2018
(Queensland) QLD Scorchers	2
(Australian Capital Territory) Canberra Strikers	1
27 October 2018
(New South Wales) NSW Arrows	4
(Victoria (state)) VIC Vipers	3

Final
28 October 2018
(Queensland) QLD Scorchers	6
(New South Wales) NSW Arrows	7
Third place match
28 October 2018
(Australian Capital Territory) Canberra Strikers (p.s.o)	4 (2)
(Victoria (state)) VIC Vipers	4 (0)

==== Quarterfinals ====
25 October 2018
13:00 (AEST)

QLD Scorchers (Queensland)	13–0	(Northern Territory) NT Pearls
Kenny 15+', 43', 49'; Greiner 22', 22'; Wilkinson 24', 24'; Eleison 25'; Kershaw 28', 29', 49', 49'; M. Fitzpatrick 33'	Report

Gold Coast Hockey Centre, Gold Coast
Umpires:
Michelle Farnill (AUS)
Melissa Trivic (AUS)

25 October 2018
14:45 (AEST)

SA Suns (South Australia)	0–0	(Australian Capital Territory) Canberra Strikers
	Report
Penalties
Spano (penalty shoot-out missed); Evans (penalty shoot-out scored); Welstead (penalty shoot-out missed); Claxton (penalty shoot-out scored)	2–4	(penalty shoot-out scored) Taseska; (penalty shoot-out scored) Middleton; (penalty shoot-out missed) Tice; (penalty shoot-out scored) Evans; (penalty shoot-out scored) E. Bone

Gold Coast Hockey Centre, Gold Coast
Umpires:
Kerryl Chandler (AUS)
Tamara Leonard (AUS)

25 October 2018
16:30 (AEST)

VIC Vipers (Victoria (state))	6–0	(Tasmania) Tassie Van Demons
Padget 5', 5'; Ratcliffe 18', 41', 41'; Brazel 20'	Report

Gold Coast Hockey Centre, Gold Coast
Umpires:
Kristy Robertson (AUS)
Caroline Davis (AUS)

25 October 2018
18:15 (AEST)

NSW Arrows (New South Wales)	6–0	(Western Australia) WA Diamonds
Jenner 11', 28', 28'; Smith 31', 31'; Stewart 34'	Report

Gold Coast Hockey Centre, Gold Coast
Umpires:
Nicola Brown (AUS)
Emily Carroll (AUS)

==== Fifth to eighth place classification ====
Crossover
27 October 2018
(Northern Territory) NT Pearls	0
(South Australia) SA Suns	5
27 October 2018
(Western Australia) WA Diamonds	10
(Tasmania) Tassie Van Demons	0

Fifth place match
28 October 2018
(South Australia) SA Suns	2 (3)
(Western Australia) WA Diamonds (p.s.o)	2 (4)
Seventh place match
28 October 2018
(Northern Territory) NT Pearls	5
(Tasmania) Tassie Van Demons	3

===== Crossover =====
October 2018
08:45 (AEST)

NT Pearls (Northern Territory)	0–5	(South Australia) SA Suns
	Report	Talbot 17', 17'; Spano 26'; Grist 53', 54'

Gold Coast Hockey Centre, Gold Coast
Umpires:
Emily Carroll (AUS)
Caroline Davis (AUS)

October 2018
10:30 (AEST)

WA Diamonds (Western Australia)	10–0	(Tasmania) Tassie Van Demons
Slattery 4', 46', 46'; Broek 11', 59', 59', 59'; Squibb 20'; Bestall 27', 27'	Report

Gold Coast Hockey Centre, Gold Coast
Umpires:
Tamara Leonard (AUS)
Michelle Farnill (AUS)

===== Seventh and eighth place =====
October 2018
08:45 (AEST)

NT Pearls (Northern Territory)	5–3	(Tasmania) Tassie Van Demons
J. Graf 18', 18'; Lidbetter 33', 33'; G. Graf 41'	Report	Gunn 6', 6'; Arthur 55'

Gold Coast Hockey Centre, Gold Coast
Umpires:
Nicola Brown (AUS)
Caroline Davis (AUS)

===== Fifth and sixth place =====
October 2018
08:45 (AEST)

SA Suns (South Australia)	2–2	(Western Australia) WA Diamonds
Grist 15', 60'	Report	Broek 58', 58'
Penalties
McMahon (penalty shoot-out scored); Welstead (penalty shoot-out missed); Evans (penalty shoot-out scored); Claxton (penalty shoot-out missed); Spano (penalty shoot-out scored) —— McMahon (penalty shoot-out missed)	3–4	(penalty shoot-out scored) Malan; (penalty shoot-out missed) Squibb; (penalty shoot-out missed) Rockliff; (penalty shoot-out scored) Broek; (penalty shoot-out scored) Slattery —— (penalty shoot-out scored) Slattery

Gold Coast Hockey Centre, Gold Coast
Umpires:
Kerryl Chandler (AUS)
Michelle Farnill (AUS)

==== First to fourth place classification ====
===== Semi-finals =====
27 October 2018
12:30 (AEST)

QLD Scorchers (Queensland)	2–1	(Australian Capital Territory) Canberra Strikers
Holzberger 14'; Kenny 25'	Report	Bailey-Price 48'

Gold Coast Hockey Centre, Gold Coast
Umpires:
Melissa Trivic (AUS)
Nicola Brown (AUS)

27 October 2018
14:00 (AEST)

NSW Arrows (New South Wales)	4–3	(Victoria (state)) VIC Vipers
Smith 30', 30'; Williams 36', 36'	Report	Hurtz 47', 47', 55'

Gold Coast Hockey Centre, Gold Coast
Umpires:
Kerryl Chandler (AUS)
Kristy Robertson (AUS)

===== Third and fourth place =====
28 October 2018
12:30 (AEST)

Canberra Strikers (Australian Capital Territory)	4–4	(Victoria (state)) VIC Vipers
Gaughan 23', 23'; E. Bone 34'; Tice 45'	Report	Brazel 17', 17'; Hurtz 57', 57'
Penalties
Taseska (penalty shoot-out missed); Middleton (penalty shoot-out scored); Tice (penalty shoot-out scored)	2–0	(penalty shoot-out missed) Hurtz; (penalty shoot-out missed) Ratcliffe; (penalty shoot-out missed) Brazel; (penalty shoot-out missed) Bates

Gold Coast Hockey Centre, Gold Coast
Umpires:
Tamara Leonard (AUS)
Kristy Robertson (AUS)

===== Final =====
28 October 2018
15:30 (AEST)

QLD Scorchers (Queensland)	6–7	(New South Wales) NSW Arrows
S. Fitzpatrick 12', 12', 56'; Kenny 33'; Kershaw 59', 59'	Report	Williams 5', 5'; Hayes 21', 21'; Farrell 35'; Stewart 49'; Wilson 53'

Gold Coast Hockey Centre, Gold Coast
Umpires:
Melissa Trivic (AUS)
Emily Carroll (AUS)

== Awards ==
Player of the Tournament	Top Goalscorer	Player of the Final	Goalkeeper of the Tournament
(Australian Capital Territory) Elena Tice (Victoria (state)) Lily Brazel	(Queensland) Rebecca Greiner (Queensland) Jodie Kenny (Victoria (state)) Emily Hurtz	(New South Wales) Kaitlin Nobbs	(Victoria (state)) Rachael Lynch

== Statistics ==
=== Final standings ===
Pos	Team	Pld	W	WD	LD	L	GF	GA	GD	Pts	Qualification
1st place, gold medalist(s)	(New South Wales) NSW Arrows	6	5	0	0	1	30	15	+15	25	Gold Medal
2nd place, silver medalist(s)	(Queensland) QLD Scorchers	6	4	0	0	2	44	14	+30	20	Silver Medal
3rd place, bronze medalist(s)	(Australian Capital Territory) Canberra Strikers	6	2	2	0	2	11	11	0	16	Bronze Medal
4	(Victoria (state)) VIC Vipers	6	4	0	1	1	28	8	+20	22	
5	(Western Australia) WA Diamonds	6	2	1	0	3	19	13	+6	13	
6	(South Australia) SA Suns	6	3	0	2	1	13	5	+8	19	
7	(Northern Territory) NT Pearls	6	1	0	0	5	6	42	−36	5	
8	(Tasmania) Tassie Van Demons	6	0	0	0	6	4	47	−43	0	

Source: Hockey Australia

=== Goalscorers ===
There were 155 goals scored in 24 matches, for an average of 6.46 goals per match.

9 goals

- (Queensland) Rebecca Greiner
- (Queensland) Jodie Kenny
- (Victoria (state)) Emily Hurtz

8 goals

- (New South Wales) Grace Stewart
- (Queensland) Stephanie Kershaw

7 goals

- (Queensland) Ambrosia Malone
- (Victoria (state)) Madeleine Ratcliffe

6 goals

- (New South Wales) Emily Smith
- (Western Australia) Roos Broek

5 goals

- (Western Australia) Penny Squibb

4 goals

- (New South Wales) Kate Jenner
- (New South Wales) Mariah Williams
- (South Australia) Emily Grist
- (Victoria (state)) Lily Brazel
- (Western Australia) Kathryn Slattery

3 goals

- (New South Wales) Jessica Watterson
- (Queensland) Savannah Fitzpatrick
- (South Australia) Karri McMahon
- (South Australia) Leah Welstead
- (Victoria (state)) Aisling Utri

2 goals

- (Australian Capital Territory) Meredith Bone
- (Australian Capital Territory) Sophie Gaughan
- (Australian Capital Territory) Beckie Middleton
- (New South Wales) Greta Hayes
- (Northern Territory) Jacqueline Graf
- (Northern Territory) Erin Lidbetter
- (Queensland) Jordyn Holzberger
- (Queensland) Renee Taylor
- (Queensland) Britt Wilkinson
- (South Australia) Lucy Talbot
- (Tasmania) Julia Gunn
- (Victoria (state)) Hannah Gravenall
- (Victoria (state)) Hayley Padget
- (Western Australia) Danielle Bestall

1 goal

- (Australian Capital Territory) Catriona Bailey-Price
- (Australian Capital Territory) Edwina Bone
- (Australian Capital Territory) Naomi Evans
- (Australian Capital Territory) Tina Taseska
- (Australian Capital Territory) Elena Tice
- (New South Wales) Lisa Farrell
- (New South Wales) Sarah Johnston
- (New South Wales) Abigail Wilson
- (Northern Territory) Georgia Graf
- (Northern Territory) Jessica Martin-Brown
- (Queensland) Layla Eleison
- (Queensland) Madison Fitzpatrick
- (South Australia) Michaela Spano
- (Tasmania) Ashleigh Arthur
- (Tasmania) Samantha Lawrence
- (Victoria (state)) Nicola Hammond
- (Western Australia) Sage Rogers-Uff
- (Western Australia) Shanea Tonkin

Source: Hockey Australia
