= 2015 Under 21 Women's Australian Hockey Championships =

Tournament details
- City: Hobart, Tasmania
- Dates: 12–19 July
- Teams: 8
- Venue: Tasmanian Hockey Centre

Final positions
- Champions: (Victoria (state)) Victoria
- Runner-up: New South Wales
- Third place: Queensland

Tournament statistics
- Matches played: 24
- Goals scored: 119 (4.96 per match)
- Top scorer: (South Australia) Amber Mutch (7 goals)

The 2015 Under 21 Women's Australian Hockey Championship was a women's field hockey tournament. The competition was held in the Tasmanian city of Hobart, from 12 to 19 July.

Victoria won the gold medal, defeating New South Wales 3–2 in the final. Queensland finished in third place after a 4–1 win against Western Australia in the third place match.

== Competition format ==
The tournament is divided into two pools, Pool A and Pool B, consisting of four teams in a round robin format. Teams then progress into either Pool C, the medal round, or Pool D, the classification round. Teams carry over points from their previous match ups, and contest teams they are yet to play.

The top two teams in each of pools A and B then progress to Pool C. The top two teams in Pool C continue to contest the Final, while the bottom two teams of Pool C play in the Third and Fourth place match.

The remaining bottom placing teams make up Pool D. The top two teams in Pool D play in the Fifth and Sixth place match, while the bottom two teams of Pool C play in the Seventh and Eighth place match.

== Teams ==
- (Australian Capital Territory) ACT
- (New South Wales) NSW AAP
- (New South Wales) NSW
- (Queensland) QLD
- (South Australia) SA
- (Tasmania) TAS
- (Victoria (state)) VIC
- (Western Australia) WA

== Results ==
All times are local (AEST).

=== Preliminary round ===
==== Pool A ====
Pos	Team	Pld	W	D	L	GF	GA	GD	Pts	Qualification
1	(Victoria (state)) VIC	3	3	0	0	11	4	+7	9	Advanced to Medal Round
2	(Queensland) QLD	3	2	0	1	10	6	+4	6	Advanced to Medal Round
3	(South Australia) SA	3	1	0	2	11	13	−2	3	
4	(New South Wales) NSW AAP	3	0	0	3	4	13	−9	0	

Source: Hockey Australia

12 July 2015
09:30

QLD (Queensland)	5–0	(New South Wales) NSW AAP
Barrett 10', 58'; Allendorf 13'; Wilkinson 32'; M. Fitzpatrick 48'	Report

Umpires:
Emma Cairnduff (AUS)
Courtney Pearson (AUS)

12 July 2015
13:30

SA (South Australia)	2–6	(Victoria (state)) VIC
Spano 33'; Mutch 38'	Report	Eades 28'; Ratcliffe 33', 37'; Utri 39', 53'; Down 47'

Umpires:
Rachel Beagley (AUS)
Angela May (AUS)

13 July 2015
09:30

SA (South Australia)	6–3	(New South Wales) NSW AAP
Burrell 10'; Busiko 15'; Mutch 35', 52', 54'; Nance 57'	Report	Wilson 6'; Blamey 27'; Smith 45'

Umpires:
Keeley O'Reilly (AUS)
Kristy Robertson (AUS)

13 July 2015
13:30

VIC (Victoria (state))	3–1	(New South Wales) NSW AAP
Ratcliffe 42'; Barden 47'; S. Taylor 59'	Report	M. Fitzpatrick 8'

Umpires:
Angela May (AUS)
Courtney Pearson (AUS)

15 July 2015
11:30

QLD (Queensland)	4–3	(South Australia) SA
Kershaw 9', 17', 45'; Malone 14'	Report	Spano 6', 55'; Mutch 32'

Umpires:
Kerryl Chandler (AUS)
Courtney Pearson (AUS)

15 July 2015
15:30

VIC (Victoria (state))	2–1	(New South Wales) NSW AAP
Barden 15'; Down 25'	Report	Wilson 54'

Umpires:
Carrie Born (AUS)
Tamara Leonard (AUS)

==== Pool B ====
Pos	Team	Pld	W	D	L	GF	GA	GD	Pts	Qualification
1	(New South Wales) NSW	3	3	0	0	12	1	+11	9	Advance to Medal Round
2	(Western Australia) WA	3	2	0	1	8	6	+2	6	Advance to Medal Round
3	(Australian Capital Territory) ACT	3	1	0	2	4	7	−3	3	
4	(Tasmania) TAS	3	0	0	3	2	12	−10	0	

12 July 2015
11:30

NSW (New South Wales)	5–1	(Tasmania) TAS
Rekunow 28', 34'; Hunter 30'; Hayes 44'; Carmichael 53'	Report	Calvert 30'

Tasmanian Hockey Centre
Umpires:
Carrie Born (AUS)
Keeley O'Reilly (AUS)

12 July 2015
15:30

WA (Western Australia)	3–2	(Australian Capital Territory) ACT
Nalder 23'; Flynn 49'; Peacock 60'	Report	Apps 33'; Gray 48'

Tasmanian Hockey Centre
Umpires:
Tamara Leonard (AUS)
Kristy Robertson (AUS)

13 July 2015
11:30

ACT (Australian Capital Territory)	0–3	(New South Wales) NSW
	Report	Stewart 14'; Gillard 17'; Rosser 37'

Tasmanian Hockey Centre
Umpires:
Tahlya Sleep (AUS)
Kerryl Chandler (AUS)

13 July 2015
15:30

WA (Western Australia)	5–0	(Tasmania) TAS
Archer 22', 38'; Capewell 26', 29'; Nalder 58'	Report

Tasmanian Hockey Centre
Umpires:
Rachel Beagley (AUS)
Emma Cairnduff (AUS)

15 July 2015
09:30

NSW (New South Wales)	4–0	(Western Australia) WA
Rosser 23'; Stewart 30'; Richards 38'; Carmichael 54'	Report

Tasmanian Hockey Centre
Umpires:
Rachel Beagley (AUS)
Kristy Robertson (AUS)

15 July 2015
13:30

(Tasmania) TAS	1–2	ACT (Australian Capital Territory)
Murphy 54'	Report	Taseska 21'; Gray 34'

Tasmanian Hockey Centre
Umpires:
Tahlya Sleep (AUS)
Keeley O'Reilly (AUS)

=== Second round ===
==== Pool C (Medal Round) ====
Pos	Team	Pld	W	D	L	GF	GA	GD	Pts
1	(Victoria (state)) VIC	3	2	0	1	10	5	+5	6
2	(New South Wales) NSW	3	2	0	1	8	4	+4	6
3	(Queensland) QLD	3	2	0	1	7	5	+2	6
4	(Western Australia) WA	3	0	0	3	2	13	−11	0

16 July 2015
13:30

QLD (Queensland)	3–1	(Western Australia) WA
Wilkinson 17'; M. Fitzpatrick 19', 44'	Report	Capewell 33'

Tasmanian Hockey Centre
Umpires:
Angela May (AUS)
Emma Cairnduff (AUS)

16 July 2015
15:30

VIC (Victoria (state))	1–3	(New South Wales) NSW
S. Taylor 53'	Report	Rosser 18'; Richards 50'; Stewart 51'

Tasmanian Hockey Centre
Umpires:
Kristy Robertson (AUS)
Rachel Beagley (AUS)

18 July 2015
13:30

NSW (New South Wales)	1–3	(Queensland) QLD
Carmichael 15'	Report	Malone 19'; Allendorf 30'; Barrett 37'

Tasmanian Hockey Centre
Umpires:
Courtney Pearson (AUS)
Rachel Beagley (AUS)

18 July 2015
15:30

VIC (Victoria (state))	6–1	(Western Australia) WA
Utri 10'; Pearce 26'; Barden 33'; Ratcliffe 39', 58'; Anderson 57'	Report	Tonkin 55'

Tasmanian Hockey Centre
Umpires:
Angela May (AUS)
Kristy Robertson (AUS)

==== Pool D (Classification Round) ====
Pos	Team	Pld	W	D	L	GF	GA	GD	Pts
1	(New South Wales) NSW AAP	3	2	0	1	14	9	+5	6
2	(South Australia) SA	3	2	0	1	12	7	+5	6
3	(Australian Capital Territory) ACT	3	2	0	1	7	9	−2	6
4	(Tasmania) TAS	3	0	0	3	3	11	−8	0

16 July 2015
09:30

NSW AAP (New South Wales)	4–0	(Tasmania) TAS
Blamey 2'; Smith 27'; Wilson 27'; McCauley 38'	Report

Tasmanian Hockey Centre
Umpires:
Tahlya Sleep (AUS)
Courtney Pearson (AUS)

16 July 2015
11:30

SA (South Australia)	1–2	(Australian Capital Territory) ACT
Watters 57'	Report	Toole 7'; Evans 48'

Tasmanian Hockey Centre
Umpires:
Kerryl Chandler (AUS)
Carrie Born (AUS)

18 July 2015
09:30

ACT (Australian Capital Territory)	3–7	(New South Wales) NSW AAP
Economos 8'; Gray 41'; Montgomery 42'	Report	Divall 15'; Wilson 23', 51', 55'; Smith 40'; Blamey 44'; Johnston 54'

Tasmanian Hockey Centre
Umpires:
Keeley O'Reilly (AUS)
Emma Cairnduff (AUS)

18 July 2015
11:30

SA (South Australia)	5–2	(Tasmania) TAS
Spano 3', 44'; Mutch 12', 42'; Watters 25'	Report	Arthur 5'; Kenworthy 47'

Tasmanian Hockey Centre
Umpires:
Kerryl Chandler (AUS)
Carrie Born (AUS)

=== Classification matches ===
==== Seventh and eighth place ====
19 July 2015
09:30

(Australian Capital Territory) ACT	1–0	TAS (Tasmania)
Gray 3'	Report

Tasmanian Hockey Centre
Umpires:
Kerryl Chandler (AUS)
Keeley O'Reilly (AUS)

==== Fifth and sixth place ====
19 July 2015
11:30

NSW AAP (New South Wales)	1–2	(South Australia) SA
Simpson 34'	Report	Spano 18'; McKenna 37'

Tasmanian Hockey Centre
Umpires:
Emma Cairnduff (AUS)
Tamara Leonard (AUS)

==== Third and fourth place ====
19 July 2015
13:30

QLD (Queensland)	4–1	(Western Australia) WA
Kershaw 19'; R. Taylor 24'; Ferguson 27'; Malone 31'	Report	Peacock 35'

Tasmanian Hockey Centre
Umpires:
Angela May (AUS)
Courtney Pearson (AUS)

==== Final ====
19 July 2015
16:00

VIC (Victoria (state))	3–2	(New South Wales) NSW
Utri 5'; Pearce 18'; Ratcliffe 57'	Report	Hunter 41'; Stewart 52'

Tasmanian Hockey Centre
Umpires:
Kristy Robertson (AUS)
Rachel Beagley (AUS)

== Statistics ==
=== Final standings ===
Pos	Team	Pld	W	D	L	GF	GA	GD	Pts	Final Result
1st place, gold medalist(s)	(Victoria (state)) VIC	6	5	0	1	21	10	+11	15	Gold Medal
2nd place, silver medalist(s)	(New South Wales) NSW	6	4	0	2	18	8	+10	12	Silver Medal
3rd place, bronze medalist(s)	(Queensland) QLD	6	5	0	1	20	9	+11	15	Bronze Medal
4	(Western Australia) WA	6	2	0	4	11	19	−8	6	
5	(South Australia) SA	6	3	0	3	19	18	+1	9	
6	(New South Wales) NSW AAP	6	2	0	4	16	18	−2	6	
7	(Australian Capital Territory) ACT	6	3	0	3	10	15	−5	9	
8	(Tasmania) TAS	6	0	0	6	4	22	−18	0	
