= Mariah Williams =

Australian field hockey player

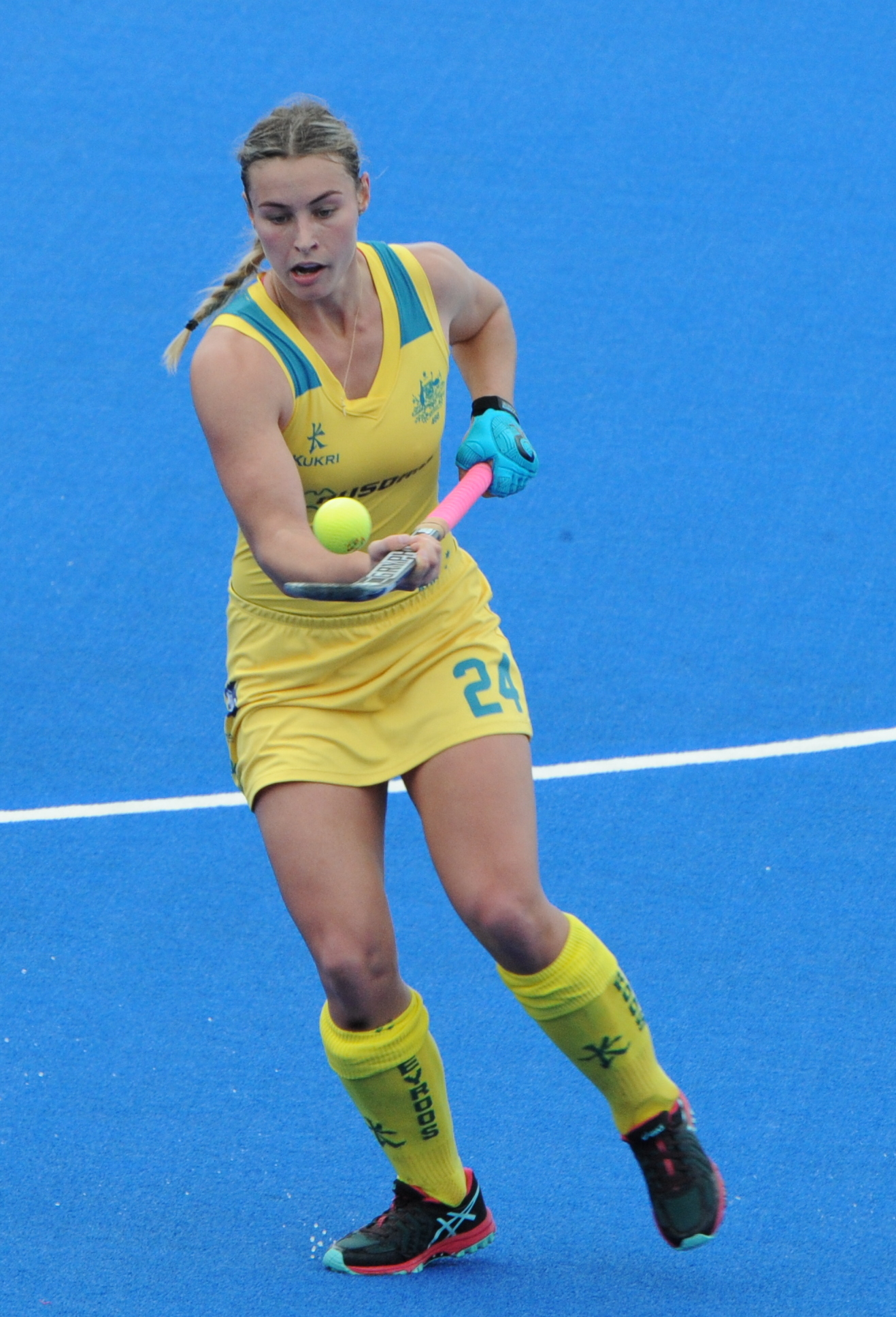

Personal information
- Full name: Mariah Alice Williams
- Born: 31 May 1995 (age 31) Parkes, New South Wales, Australia
- Height: 1.68 m (5 ft 6 in)
- Weight: 66 kg (146 lb)

Sport
- Sport: Field hockey
- Position: Attacker
- Club: NSW Arrows
National team
Years	Team	Caps	Goals
2013–2016	Australia U21	13	(4)
2013–	Australia	81	(15)
Medal record
Women's field hockey
Representing Australia
World Cup
Bronze medal – third place	2022 Terrassa/Amstelveen
Commonwealth Games
Silver medal – second place	2022 Birmingham	Team
FIH Pro League
Silver medal – second place	2019
Bronze medal – third place	2022–23
Oceania Cup
Gold medal – first place	2015 Stratford
Gold medal – first place	2023 Whangārei
Silver medal – second place	2019 Rockhampton
Silver medal – second place	2025 Darwin
Junior World Cup
Bronze medal – third place	2016 Santiago

Mariah Williams (born 31 May 1995) is an Australian field hockey player. She represented her country at the 2016 Summer Olympics.

== Personal life ==
Williams was born and raised in Parkes, New South Wales.

She plays national representative hockey for her home state. She also featured as the a headline player for New South Wales in the launch of their new premier team, NSW Pride, which will compete in the inaugural Hockey One league in 2019.

In 2017, Williams was honoured by her home town council after a new synthetic hockey pitch was named after her.

== Career ==
=== Junior national team ===
Williams first played for the 'Jillaroos' team in 2013, at the Australian Youth Olympic Festival in January. Williams again represented the team at the Junior Oceania Cup in February, which qualified the team for the 2013 Junior World Cup.

Williams made her last appearance for the Jillaroos in 2016, where she captained the team to a bronze medal at the Junior World Cup.

=== Senior national team ===
Williams made her senior international debut in April 2013, in a test series against Korea in Perth, Western Australia.

In 2017, Williams was forced to miss numerous competitions due to ongoing injury to her adductor. The injury ultimately ruled her out for almost two years.

Williams made her return to the senior national team in February 2019, in the inaugural tournament of the FIH Pro League, where Australia finished second.

Following her return to international hockey in the FIH Pro League, Williams was named in the Oceania Cup squad. At the tournament Williams scored one goal, and Australia finished in second place.

Williams qualified for the Tokyo 2020 Olympics. She was part of the Hockeyroos Olympics squad. The Hockeyroos lost 1–0 to India in the quarterfinals and therefore were not in medal contention.

==== International goals ====
Goal	Date	Location	Opponent	Score	Result	Competition	Ref.
1	25 January 2014	Hartleyvale Stadium, Stellenbosch, South Africa	South Africa	2–0	4–1	Test Match	
2	5 April 2015	Sydney Olympic Park, Sydney, Australia	China	1–1	3–2	Test Match	
3	4 July 2015	KHC Dragons, Antwerp, Belgium	New Zealand	3–0	4–2	2014–15 HWL Semifinals	
4	22 October 2015	TET MultiSports Centre, Stratford, New Zealand	Samoa	25–0	25–0	2015 Oceania Cup	
5	12 February 2016	Bunbury Hockey Stadium, Bunbury, Australia	Great Britain	3–2	4–3	Test Match	
6	26 June 2016	Lee Valley Hockey and Tennis Centre, London, England	United States	1–0	2–2 (0–1)	2016 Champions Trophy	
7	13 August 2016	Olympic Hockey Centre, Rio de Janeiro, Brazil	Japan	1–0	2–0	2016 Olympic Games	
8	9 February 2019	Tasmanian Hockey Centre, Hobart, Australia	China	1–0	4–3	2019 FIH Pro League	
9	16 February 2019	Perth Hockey Stadium, Perth, Australia	Great Britain	2–0	3–0	2019 FIH Pro League	
10	2 March 2019	Sydney Olympic Park, Sydney, Australia	United States	2–1	2–1	2019 FIH Pro League	
11	9 June 2019	Lee Valley Hockey and Tennis Centre, London, England	Great Britain	4–0	4–2	2019 FIH Pro League	
12	29 June 2019	Wagener Stadium, Amstelveen, Netherlands	Netherlands	1–0	2–2 (3–4)	2019 FIH Pro League	
13	8 September 2019	Kalka Shades Hockey Fields, Rockhampton, Australia	New Zealand	1–0	1–1	2019 Oceania Cup	
14	26 October 2019	Perth Hockey Stadium, Perth, Australia	Russia	2–0	5–0	FIH Olympic Qualifiers	
15	26 October 2019	Perth Hockey Stadium, Perth, Australia	Russia	5–0	5–0	FIH Olympic Qualifiers	
