= Sarah Byrnes =

Australian field hockey player

Personal information
- Full name: Sarah Louise Byrnes
- Born: 19 October 2000 (age 25) Perth, Australia

Sport
- Sport: Field hockey
- Position: Forward
Senior career
Years	Team	Caps	Goals
2022–	Perth Thundersticks	23	0
National team
Years	Team	Caps	Goals
2026–	Australia	11	(0)
Medal record
Women's field hockey
Representing Australia

Sarah Byrnes (born 19 October 2000) is an Australian field hockey player.

== Personal life ==
Sarah Byrnes was born in Perth, Australia.

She holds a scholarship at the Western Australian Institute of Sport.

== Career ==
=== Domestic league ===
Throughout her senior career, Byrnes has competed in the Hockey WA Premier Division. Until 2022 she represented Curtin University Hockey Club, and has played for the Hale Hockey Club since the 2023 season.

In Hockey Australia's domestic league, the One Active Hockey One, Byrnes represents her home state as a member of the Perth Thundersticks. She was a member of the championship winning squad in the fifth season of the league.

=== Hockeyroos ===
Byrnes spent two years in the national development squad in 2024 and 2025. She made appearances for the 'Australia A' team during the 2024 International Festival of Hockey and during a 2025 practice series against India, both held in Perth.

She was named in the Hockeyroos squad for the first time in 2025. She will make her senior debut during season seven of the FIH Pro League.
