= Michaela Spano =

Australian field hockey player (born 1997)

Personal information
- Full name: Michaela Spano
- Born: 8 April 1997 (age 29) Toorak Gardens, South Australia

Sport
- Sport: Field hockey
- Position: Attacker
Senior career
Years	Team	Caps	Goals
2014–2018	SA Suns	23	7
2019–	Adelaide Fire	7	6
National team
Years	Team	Caps	Goals
2016–2018	Australia U21	17	(3)
2019–	Australia	5	(0)
Medal record
Women's field hockey
Representing Australia
Junior World Cup
Bronze medal – third place	2016 Santiago	Team

Michaela 'Miki' Spano (born 8 April 1997) is an Australian field hockey player.

Spano was part of the Australian women's junior national team 'The Jillaroos' that won bronze at the 2016 Hockey Junior World Cup in Chile.

== Personal life ==
Spano was born in Adelaide, South Australia, and made her junior international debut 2016 Junior Oceania Cup. Spano currently lives in Toorak Gardens, South Australia and is a scholarship holder at the South Australian Institute of Sport (SASI).

== Hockey ==
=== Australia ===
Spano first represented Australia at the 2016 Junior Oceania Cup, playing in each of Australia's matches against New Zealand. The tournament served as a qualifier for the 2016 Junior World Cup in Santiago, Chile.

Replacing an injured Madi Ratcliffe in the team, Spano was also a member of the bronze medal-winning Australia U21 team at the Junior World Cup, scoring 2 goals in the tournament.

In 2017, Spano represented the Australia U23 team in a tour of Europe, as well as the Australia Development Squad in a tour of Japan.

In August 2017, Spano was named to the national junior squad for the third time.

Spano again represented Australia in 2018. In November, she represented the Under 23 side in a tour of China. She will also represent the Jillaroos in a test series against the New Zealand Under 21 side in Hastings, New Zealand.

In December 2018, Spano was named in the Australian Development Squad for the 2019 calendar year.

==== Senior National Team ====
In March 2018, Spano was named in the Hockeyroos team to make her senior international debut in the Hockey Pro League.

Spano's official debut came on 16 March in the Pro League Match against Argentina.

=== State Hockey ===
Spano plays state hockey for her home state, South Australia, at both junior and senior level. She has represented SA in the Australian Hockey League for the SA Suns on four occasions, most recently in 2018.

=== Club Hockey ===
Spano plays her club hockey in South Australia, for AHC. In 2018, Spano relocated to the Netherlands to represent HC Zwolle for the second half of their season.
