= Morgan Mathison =

Australian field hockey player (born 2000)

Personal information
- Born: 12 April 2000 (age 26) Gold Coast, Australia
- Height: 171 cm (5 ft 7 in)
- Weight: 65 kg (143 lb)

Sport
- Sport: Field hockey
- Position: Midfield
Senior career
Years	Team	Caps	Goals
2019–	Brisbane Blaze	-	-
National team
Years	Team	Caps	Goals
2018–2020	Australia U–21	11	(0)
2025–	Australia	17	(1)
Medal record
Women's field hockey
Representing Australia
Oceania Cup
Silver medal – second place	2025 Darwin

Morgan Mathison (born 12 April 2000) is an Australian field hockey player.

== Personal life ==
Morgan Mathison was born in the Gold Coast.

She is a former student of Griffith University.

== Career ==
=== Domestic league ===
In Hockey Australia's domestic league, the Liberty Hockey One, Mathison represents her home state as a member of the Brisbane Blaze.

=== Under–18 ===
Mathison's first international appearances for Australia came at under–18 level. She was a member of the squad at the 2018 Oceania Qualifiers for the Youth Olympic Games, held in Port Moresby. The team qualified, with Mathison captaining the team at the Youth Olympic Tournament in Buenos Aires.

=== Under–21 ===
Following her under–18 debut, Mathison debuted for the Jillaroos shortly after. She represented the squad in a Trans–Tasman test series against New Zealand in 2018.

The following year, she represented the team again in a Tri–Nations Tournament in Canberra.

=== Hockeyroos ===
In 2024, Mathison was named in the Hockeyroos squad for the first time. She will make her senior debut during season six of the FIH Pro League.
