= Alice Arnott =

Australian field hockey player (born 1998)

Personal information
- Born: 25 February 1998 (age 28) Scone, New South Wales

Sport
- Sport: Field hockey
- Position: Forward
Senior career
Years	Team	Caps	Goals
2019–2024	NSW Pride	19	13
2025–	Canberra Chill	4	0
National team
Years	Team	Caps	Goals
2018–2020	Australia U–21	11	(5)
2023–	Australia	46	(13)
Medal record
Women's field hockey
Representing Australia
Oceania Cup
Silver medal – second place	2025 Darwin

Alice Arnott (born 25 February 1998) is a field hockey player from Australia, who plays as a forward.

== Personal life ==
Alice Arnott was born and raised in Scone but progressed to play Hockey in Tamworth, New South Wales. Alice's boyfriend, Tom Craig, is a member of the Kookaburras, the Australian men's national field hockey team.

== Career ==
=== Under–21 ===
In 2018, Arnott made her debut for the Australia U–21 team during a test series against New Zealand in Hastings.

She followed this up with appearances during a tri-nations tournament in 2019, as well as a test series against Japan in 2020, both held in Canberra.

=== Hockeyroos ===
Arnott received her first Hockeyroos call-up in 2023. She made her international debut in a test series against India in Adelaide.

In 2024, Arnott was officially raised into the Hockeyroos squad. She was a member of the squad that competed at the XXXIII Summer Olympics in Paris.

==== International goals ====
Goal	Date	Location	Opponent	Score	Result	Competition	Ref.
1	18 May 2023	MATE Stadium, Adelaide, Australia	India	3–1	4–2	Test Match	
2	15 February 2024	Birsa Munda International Hockey Stadium, Rourkela, India	United States	1–0	4–0	2023–24 FIH Pro League	
3	2 June 2024	Wilrijkse Plein, Antwerp, Belgium	Belgium	1–0	1–2	2023–24 FIH Pro League	
4	11 June 2024	Lee Valley Hockey and Tennis Centre, London, England	Germany	1–3	2–3	2023–24 FIH Pro League	
5	29 July 2024	Stade Yves-du-Manoir, Paris, France	Great Britain	2–0	4–0	XXXIII Olympic Games	
6	31 July 2024	Stade Yves-du-Manoir, Paris, France	United States	2–0	3–0	XXXIII Olympic Games	
7	3 August 2024	Stade Yves-du-Manoir, Paris, France	Spain	1–0	3–1	XXXIII Olympic Games	
8	5 August 2024	Stade Yves-du-Manoir, Paris, France	China	1–0	2–3	XXXIII Olympic Games	
9	8 June 2025	Wagener Stadium, Amsterdam, Netherlands	Netherlands	1–0	1–5	2024–25 FIH Pro League	
10	2 March 2026	Centro de Hockey Césped Claudia Schüler, Santiago, Chile	France	4–0	4–0	2026 FIH World Cup Qualifiers	
11	17 June 2026	Lee Valley Hockey and Tennis Centre, London, England	Germany	2–0	2–0	2025–26 FIH Pro League	
12	20 June 2026	Lee Valley Hockey and Tennis Centre, London, England	England	2–0	3–0	2025–26 FIH Pro League	
13	23 June 2026	Belfius Hockey Arena, Wavre, Belgium	Belgium	1–1	1–1 (2–4)	2025–26 FIH Pro League	
