= Rebecca Greiner =

Australian field hockey player

Personal information
- Born: 13 June 1999 (age 27) Bundaberg, Queensland, Australia

Sport
- Sport: Field hockey
- Position: Attacker
- Club: QLD Scorchers
National team
Years	Team	Caps	Goals
2016	Australia U21	6	(0)
2018–	Australia	84	(10)
Medal record
Women's field hockey
Representing Australia
FIH World Cup
Bronze medal – third place	2022 Terrassa–Amstelveen	Team
Oceania Cup
Gold medal – first place	2023 Whangārei	Team
FIH Pro League
Bronze medal – third place	2022–23	Team
Commonwealth Games
Silver medal – second place	2022 Birmingham	Team
Champions Trophy
Silver medal – second place	2018 Changzhou	Team
FIH Junior World Cup
Bronze medal – third place	2016 Santiago	Team

Rebecca Greiner (born 13 June 1999) is an Australian field hockey player.

== Personal life ==
Greiner was a student at St. Luke's Anglican School in Bundaberg, Queensland.

Her favourite food is currently her mother's infamous 'Christmas Rumballs'.

Greiner plays national hockey for her home state Queensland in the Australian Hockey League. In the 2018 AHL, Greiner was equal highest goalscorer.

== Career ==
=== Junior ===
Greiner was a member of the Australian women's junior national team 'The Jillaroos' that won bronze at the 2016 Hockey Junior World Cup in Chile.

In 2017, Greiner represented the Australia U23 team in a tour of Europe.

=== Senior ===
Greiner made her senior international debut in November 2018 at the Hockey Champions Trophy, held in Changzhou, China.

==== International goals ====
Goal	Date	Location	Opponent	Score	Result	Competition	Ref.
1	17 November 2018	Wujin Hockey Stadium, Changzhou, China	Argentina	2–0	2–1	2018 FIH Champions Trophy	
2	15 May 2022	National Hockey Stadium, Auckland, New Zealand	New Zealand	1–1	2–1	2022 Trans–Tasman Series	
3	5 July 2022	Estadi Olímpic de Terrassa, Terrassa, Spain	Belgium	2–0	2–0	2022 FIH World Cup	
4	5 August 2022	University of Birmingham Hockey Centre, Birmingham, England	India	1–0	1–1	XXII Commonwealth Games	
5	28 April 2023	Ngā Puna Wei Sports Hub, Christchurch, New Zealand	Great Britain	1–1	3–1	2022–23 FIH Pro League	
6	28 April 2023	Ngā Puna Wei Sports Hub, Christchurch, New Zealand	Great Britain	3–1	3–1	2022–23 FIH Pro League	
7	15 February 2024	Birsa Munda International Hockey Stadium, Rourkela, India	United States	3–0	4–0	2023–24 FIH Pro League	
8	8 June 2024	Lee Valley Hockey and Tennis Centre, London, England	Great Britain	2–0	3–0	2023–24 FIH Pro League	
9	8 June 2024	Lee Valley Hockey and Tennis Centre, London, England	Great Britain	3–0	3–0	2023–24 FIH Pro League	
10	29 July 2024	Stade Yves-du-Manoir, Paris, France	Great Britain	1–0	4–0	XXXIII Olympic Games	
