= Australia women's national field hockey team =

Australia
- Nickname(s): Hockeyroos
- Association: Hockey Australia
- Confederation: OHF (Oceania)
- Head Coach: Rhett Halkett
- Assistant coach(es): Mili Arrotea; Darran Bisley; Stacia Strain
- Manager: Melissa Grey
- Captain: Claire Colwill; Kaitlin Nobbs; Grace Stewart
Home	Away

FIH ranking
- Current: 9 (3 October 2026)

Olympic Games
- Appearances: 11 (first in 1984)
- Best result: (gold) 1st (1988, 1996, 2000)

World Cup
- Appearances: 13 (first in 1981)
- Best result: (gold) 1st (1994, 1998)

Oceania Cup
- Appearances: 11 (first in 1999)
- Best result: (gold) 1st (1999, 2001, 2003, 2005, 2013, 2015, 2017, 2023)
Medal record
Event	1st	2nd	3rd
Olympic Games	3	0	0
World Cup	2	3	2
Oceania Cup	8	5	0
Champions Trophy	6	6	2
Commonwealth Games	4	2	1
Total	23	16	5
Olympic Games
Gold medal – first place	1988 Seoul	Team
Gold medal – first place	1996 Atlanta	Team
Gold medal – first place	2000 Sydney	Team
World Cup
Gold medal – first place	1994 Dublin	
Gold medal – first place	1998 Utrecht	
Silver medal – second place	1990 Sydney	
Silver medal – second place	2006 Madrid	
Silver medal – second place	2014 The Hague	
Bronze medal – third place	1983 Kuala Lumpur	
Bronze medal – third place	2022 Spain-Netherlands	
Oceania Cup
Gold medal – first place	1999 Sydney–Dunedin	
Gold medal – first place	2001 New Zealand	
Gold medal – first place	2003 Aus–NZ	
Gold medal – first place	2005 Auckland–Sydney	
Gold medal – first place	2013 Stratford	
Gold medal – first place	2015 Stratford	
Gold medal – first place	2017 Sydney	
Gold medal – first place	2023 Whangārei	
Silver medal – second place	2007 Buderim	
Silver medal – second place	2009 Invercargill	
Silver medal – second place	2011 Hobart	
Silver medal – second place	2019 Rockhampton	

The Australia women's national field hockey team (nicknamed the Hockeyroos) are, as of August 2023, ranked second in the world. Having played their first game in 1914, and their first Olympic game in 1984, they are one of Australia's most successful sporting teams, boasting three Olympic gold medals (1988, 1996, 2000), two World Cup gold medals (1994, 1998) and four Commonwealth Games gold medals (1998, 2006, 2010, 2014). The Hockeyroos have been crowned Australia's Team of the Year five times and were unanimously awarded Best Australian Team at the 2000 Sydney Olympic Games.

A notable part of the Hockeyroos colourful history has involved Ric Charlesworth. Charlesworth was at the helm of the Hockeyroos from 1993 to 2000, where his reign as coach saw the team win the 1993, 1995, 1997 and 1999 Champions Trophies; 1994 and 1998 World Cups; and the 1998 Commonwealth Games. Charlesworth took the Hockeyroos to the Atlanta and Sydney Olympic Games, where the team won back-to-back gold medals. The team was coached from 2011 by Adam Commens, who was replaced after the 2016 Summer Olympics, where the side failed to medal, by Paul Gaudoin.

Amid much turmoil, Gaudoin quit in March 2021 and was replaced by former player Katrina Powell.

Given the extent of the Hockeyroos' success, the team has consistently remained at the top of the world hockey rankings. From the late 1980s until 2000, the Australian team was ranked at number 1 in the world. Only once during this period did the Hockeyroos fail to win a tournament, when they finished fifth.

== Great Hockeyroos ==
=== Rechelle Hawkes ===
As part of the Olympic team in 1988, 1992, 1996 and 2000, Rechelle Hawkes is the most decorated Hockeyroo of all time. She is among the most successful female players in the history of international hockey. Hawkes is the only female hockey player to win three Olympic gold medals at three separate games. After 279 international matches,Hawkes retired following the Sydney Olympic Games where the Hockeyroos again won gold. In recognition of her contribution to Australian sport, she was inducted into the Sport Australia Hall of Fame in 2002. In 2018, Hawkes was made a Member of the Order of Australia for "significant service to hockey."

=== Alyson Annan ===
Alyson Annan is also one of more prominent figures in the history of the Hockeyroos. She debuted in the Australian side at the age of 18 and became renowned for her prowess in front of goal, scoring 166 goals during her career. She was widely regarded as the sharpest shooter in international women's hockey during the 1990s which was acknowledged when she won the World Hockey Player of the Year in 1999. Annan represented Australia 228 times, and was part of the 1996 and 2000 Olympic gold medal-winning teams. She remains the Hockeyroos highest goal scorer.

=== Nikki Hudson ===
As a highly recognised Hockeyroo, Nikki Hudson has become one of the most identifiable Australian athletes. Retiring in 2009, the striker was formerly the highest capped player in the history of the Hockeyroos, finishing on 303 games (at the time, being the only Hockeyroo to play over 300 games). Since her debut in 1993 at the age of 17, Hudson scored 99 goals in international competition. In 2008, she played in her third successive Olympic Games.

=== Madonna Blyth ===
Following her debut in 2004, Madonna Blyth became one of the most prominent Hockeyroos in history. Retiring in 2016, the midfielder became the highest-capped player in the history of the Hockeyroos, finishing on 342 games, surpassing the record previously set by Nikki Hudson. During her career, she won three Commonwealth Games gold medals and two World Cup silvers. She was also the captain of the team from 2009 until her retirement in 2016, following the Olympic Games.

== The Hockeyroos since 2016 ==
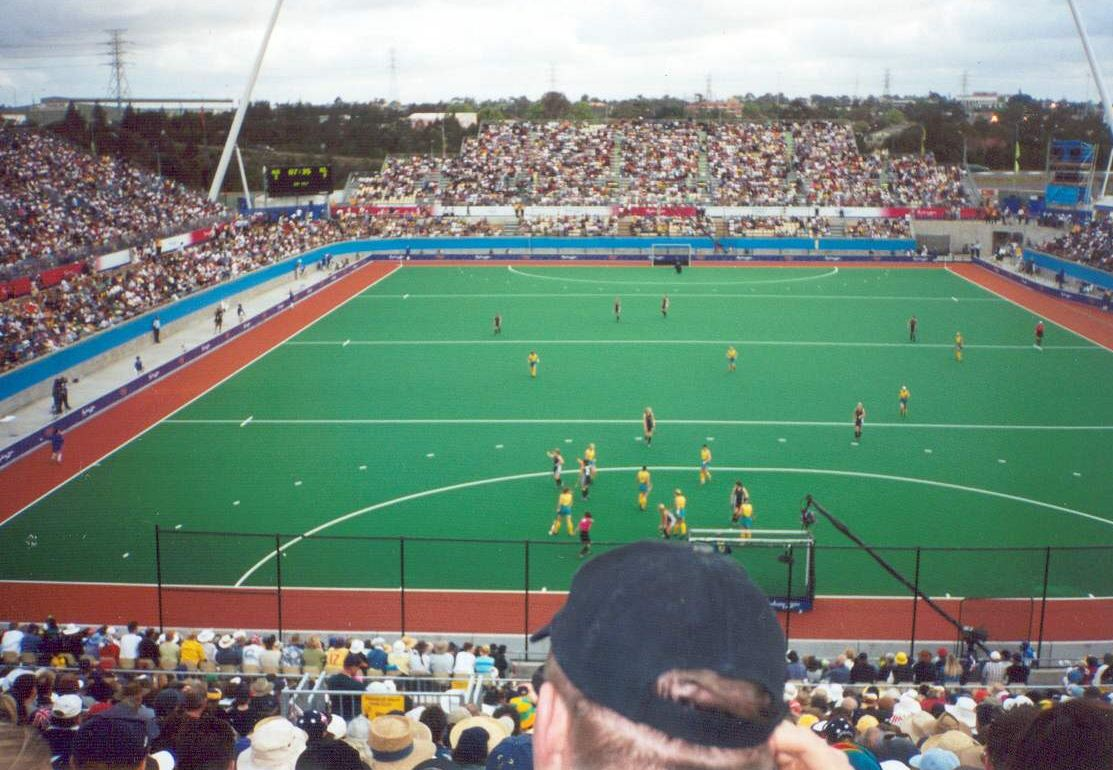
Australia vs Netherlands, Sydney 2000 Olympics

Following the 2016 Summer Olympics, many of the Hockeyroos' core players retired, forcing the team into a development phase. In 2017, long-time player Emily Chalker was named captain of the team during this rebuilding phase. Following a disappointing Hockey World League campaign, the team won the Oceania Cup, sparking what would become a string of successes for the team.

The Hockeyroos played three major tournaments in 2018, winning silver medals at the Commonwealth Games and Champions Trophy. The team only failed to medal at the World Cup, where they finished fourth.

Following her return to the squad in 2018, Jodie Kenny was named as a co-captain of the team, along with Emily Chalker and Georgina Morgan. The team started 2019 with an historic 1–0 victory over world number one, the Netherlands in the FIH Pro League, this marked their first win over the Dutch since the 2009 Champions Trophy. At the conclusion of the group stage of the FIH Pro League, the Hockeyroos finished in third place, qualifying for the Grand Final and the FIH Olympic Qualifiers.

== Tournament records ==
World Cup
Year	Host city	Position
1981	Buenos Aires, Argentina	4th
1983	Kuala Lumpur, Malaysia	3rd
1986	Amsterdam, Netherlands	6th
1990	Sydney, Australia	2nd
1994	(Republic of Ireland) Dublin, Ireland	1st
1998	Utrecht, Netherlands	1st
2002	Perth, Australia	4th
2006	Madrid, Spain	2nd
2010	Rosario, Argentina	5th
2014	The Hague, Netherlands	2nd
2018	London, England	4th
2022	Terrassa, Spain; Amsterdam, Netherlands	3rd
2026	Wavre, Belgium; Amsterdam, Netherlands	4th

Oceania Cup
Year	Host city	Position
1999	Sydney, Australia	1st
2001	Auckland, New Zealand	1st
2003	Melbourne, Australia; Auckland, New Zealand	1st
2005	Sydney, Australia; Auckland, New Zealand	1st
2007	Buderim, Australia	2nd
2009	Invercargill, New Zealand	2nd
2011	Hobart, Australia	2nd
2013	Stratford, New Zealand	1st
2015	Stratford, New Zealand	1st
2017	Sydney, Australia	1st
2019	Rockhampton, Australia	2nd
2023	Whangārei, New Zealand	1st
2025	Darwin, Australia	2nd

Commonwealth Games
Year	Host city	Position
1998	Kuala Lumpur, Malaysia	1st
2002	Manchester, England	3rd
2006	Melbourne, Australia	1st
2010	New Delhi, India	1st
2014	Glasgow, Scotland	1st
2018	(Australia) Gold Coast, Queensland	2nd
2022	Birmingham, England	2nd

World League
Year	Round	Host city	Position
2012–13	Semifinal	London, England	1st
2012–13	Final	San Miguel de Tucumán, Argentina	2nd
2014–15	Semifinal	Antwerp, Belgium	3rd
2014–15	Final	Rosario, Argentina	6th
2016–17	Semifinals	Brussels, Belgium	5th

FIH Pro League
Year		Position
2019	Season One	2nd
2020–21	Season Two	5th
2021–22	Season Three	Withdrew
2022–23	Season Four	3rd
2023–24	Season Five	6th
2024–25	Season Six	5th
2025–26	Season Seven	8th
2026–27	Season Eight	Q

Olympic Games
Year	Host city	Position
1980	Moscow, Soviet Union	N/A
1984	Los Angeles, United States	4th
1988	Seoul, South Korea	1st
1992	Barcelona, Spain	5th
1996	Atlanta, United States	1st
2000	Sydney, Australia	1st
2004	Athens, Greece	5th
2008	Beijing, China	5th
2012	London, United Kingdom	5th
2016	Rio de Janeiro, Brazil	6th
2020	Tokyo, Japan	5th
2024	Paris, France	5th
2028	Los Angeles, United States	TBD

Champions Trophy
Year	Host city	Position
1987	Amstelveen, Netherlands	2nd
1989	Germany, West Germany	2nd
1991	Berlin, Germany	1st
1993	Amstelveen, Netherlands	1st
1995	Mar del Plata, Argentina	1st
1997	Berlin, Germany	1st
1999	Brisbane, Australia	1st
2000	Amstelveen, Netherlands	3rd
2001	Amstelveen, Netherlands	3rd
2002	Macau, China	4th
2003	Sydney, Australia	1st
2004	Rosario, Argentina	4th
2005	Canberra, Australia	2nd
2006	Amstelveen, Netherlands	5th
2007	Quilmes, Argentina	4th
2008	Mönchengladbach, Germany	5th
2009	Sydney, Australia	2nd
2010	Nottingham, England	–
2011	Amstelveen, Netherlands	6th
2012	Roasario, Argentina	–
2014	Mendoza, Argentina	2nd
2016	London, England	4th
2018	Changzhou, China	2nd

Champions Challenge I
Year	Host city	Position
2002–2011 Did not Compete
2012	(Republic of Ireland) Dublin, Ireland	1st
2014	Glasgow, Scotland	–

== Team ==
=== 2026 squad ===
The following 20 players have been named in the Hockeyroos FIH World Cup squad.

Caps and goals are current as of 29 August 2026 after the match against Belgium.

Head coach: (South Africa) Rhett Halkett

No.	Pos.	Player	Date of birth (age)	Caps	Goals	Club
7	GK	Aleisha Power	1 January 1997 (age 29)	59	0	(Western Australia) Perth Thundersticks
19	GK	Jocelyn Bartram	4 May 1993 (age 33)	139	0	(New South Wales) NSW Pride
1	DF	Claire Colwill (captain)	19 September 2003 (age 23)	101	13	(Queensland) Brisbane Blaze
15	DF	Kaitlin Nobbs (captain)	24 September 1997 (age 29)	180	12	(New South Wales) NSW Pride
17	DF	Lucy Sharman	24 May 2003 (age 23)	51	1	(South Australia) Adelaide Fire
18	DF	Alana Kavanagh	24 March 2003 (age 23)	43	0	(New South Wales) NSW Pride
20	DF	Karri Somerville	7 April 1999 (age 27)	94	0	(Western Australia) Perth Thundersticks
22	DF	Tatum Stewart	22 February 2002 (age 24)	65	10	(Queensland) Brisbane Blaze
3	MF	Morgan Mathison	12 April 2000 (age 26)	39	1	(Queensland) Brisbane Blaze
4	MF	Amy Lawton	19 January 2002 (age 24)	119	5	(Victoria (state)) HC Melbourne
5	MF	Grace Young	23 August 2002 (age 24)	72	1	(New South Wales) NSW Pride
6	MF	Sarah Byrnes	19 October 2000 (age 26)	22	0	(Western Australia) Perth Thundersticks
10	MF	Abigail Wilson	27 June 1998 (age 28)	45	4	(New South Wales) NSW Pride
14	MF	Stephanie Kershaw	19 April 1995 (age 31)	145	30	(Tasmania) Tassie Tigers
11	FW	Alice Arnott	25 February 1998 (age 28)	53	13	(New South Wales) NSW Pride
13	FW	Makayla Jones	20 July 2004 (age 22)	8	0	(New South Wales) NSW Pride
16	FW	Courtney Schonell	17 September 2000 (age 26)	58	11	(Western Australia) Perth Thundersticks
24	FW	Mariah Williams	31 May 1995 (age 31)	173	27	(New South Wales) NSW Pride
30	FW	Grace Stewart (captain)	28 April 1997 (age 29)	164	41	(New South Wales) NSW Pride
31	FW	Neasa Flynn	13 August 2001 (age 25)	17	3	(Western Australia) Perth Thundersticks

The following seven players were named as non-travelling reserves:

No.	Pos.	Player	Date of birth (age)	Caps	Goals	Club
25	GK	Zoe Newman	28 July 1999 (age 27)	30	0	(New South Wales) NSW Pride
2	DF	Casey Dolkens	8 January 2000 (age 26)	8	0	(Queensland) Brisbane Blaze
35	DF	Sophie Murphy	12 September 1995 (age 31)	46	2	(Victoria (state)) HC Melbourne
38	DF	Jolie Sertorio	25 December 2001 (age 24)	5	0	(Western Australia) Perth Thundersticks
28	FW	Hannah Cullum-Sanders	30 July 2003 (age 23)	33	2	(Queensland) Brisbane Blaze
39	FW	Mihaylia Howell	11 March 2006 (age 20)	6	2	(Victoria (state)) HC Melbourne

The remainder of the national squad is as follows:

No.	Pos.	Player	Date of birth (age)	Caps	Goals	Club
12	MF	Greta Hayes ^{RET}	17 October 1996 (age 30)	78	5	(New South Wales) NSW Pride
23	FW	Olivia Downes	18 December 2000 (age 25)	17	2	(Victoria (state)) HC Melbourne
21	FW	Jade Smith	16 February 2001 (age 25)	18	5	(Queensland) Brisbane Blaze

=== Recent call-ups ===
The following players have received call-ups to the national team in the last 12 months:

Pos.	Player	Date of birth (age)	Caps	Goals	Club	Latest call-up
GK	Alyssa Smith	10 December 2005 (age 20)	2	0	(Australian Capital Territory) Canberra Chill	v. China; 25 February 2026
DF	Maddison Smith	17 March 2000 (age 26)	30	0	(New South Wales) NSW Pride	v. China; 25 February 2026
DF	Georgie Smithers	14 May 2004 (age 22)	3	0	(Australian Capital Territory) Canberra Chill	v. China; 25 February 2026
MF	Maddison Brooks	23 September 2004 (age 22)	48	7	(Tasmania) Tassie Tigers	v. China; 25 February 2026
MF	Camryn Mathison	27 March 2006 (age 20)	3	0	(Queensland) Brisbane Blaze	v. China; 25 February 2026
MF	Jesse Reid	13 December 2000 (age 25)	7	0	(Western Australia) Perth Thundersticks	v. China; 25 February 2026
MF	Karissa van der Wath	7 July 2006 (age 20)	6	0	(Queensland) Brisbane Blaze	v. China; 25 February 2026
MF	Georgina West	15 June 2004 (age 22)	4	1	(Australian Capital Territory) Canberra Chill	v. China; 25 February 2026
MF	Bianca Zurrer	22 January 2006 (age 20)	3	0	(Victoria (state)) HC Melbourne	v. China; 25 February 2026
FW	Rebecca Greiner (captain)	13 June 1999 (age 27)	84	10	(Victoria (state)) HC Melbourne	v. China; 25 February 2026
FW	Lexie Pickering	26 June 2001 (age 25)	10	4	(Western Australia) Perth Thundersticks	v. China; 25 February 2026
FW	Zali Ward	18 June 2003 (age 23)	3	0	(Victoria (state)) HC Melbourne	v. China; 25 February 2026

=== Records ===
Highest capped players
Rank	Player	Games
1	Madonna Blyth	342
2	Nikki Hudson	303
3	Rechelle Hawkes	279
4	Karen Smith	271
5	Casey Sablowski	258
6	Emily Chalker	255
7	Katrina Powell	252
8	Jane Claxton	250
9	Jodie Kenny	235
10	Rachael Lynch	233

Highest goalscorers
Rank	Player	Goals
1	Alyson Annan	166
2	Katrina Powell	141
3	Jodie Kenny	111
4	Jackie Pereira	109
5	Nicole Hudson	99
6	Emily Chalker	88
7	Jenn Morris	83
8	Michelle Andrews	74
9	Madonna Blyth	71
10	Ashleigh Nelson	69

== Results ==
=== Past results ===
- National results (2001–2005)
- National results (2006–2010)
- National results (2011–2015)
- National results (2016–2020)
- National results (2021–2025)
- National results (2026–2030)

=== 2026 fixtures and results ===
2026 statistics
Pld	W	WD	D	LD	L	GF	GA	GD	Pts
28	6	3	3	2	14	35	51	–16	29

==== FIH Pro League ====
11 February 2026 Australia Leg	Australia	0–1	Argentina	Hobart, Australia
17:00		Report	Gorzelany 39'	Stadium: Tasmanian Hockey Centre

12 February 2026 Australia Leg	Australia	0–0 (4–2 p)	Ireland	Hobart, Australia
19:30		Report		Stadium: Tasmanian Hockey Centre
	Penalties
	Downes (penalty shoot-out scored); Williams (penalty shoot-out scored); Arnott (penalty shoot-out scored); Stewart (penalty shoot-out missed); Nobbs (penalty shoot-out scored)		(penalty shoot-out missed) Beggs; (penalty shoot-out missed) Power; (penalty shoot-out scored) McLoughlin; (penalty shoot-out scored) McMaster

14 February 2026 Australia Leg	Australia	0–3	Argentina	Hobart, Australia
18:30		Report	Díaz 17'; Trinchinetti 44'; Gorzelany 48'	Stadium: Tasmanian Hockey Centre

15 February 2026 Australia Leg	Australia	1–4	Ireland	Hobart, Australia
18:30	Downes 3'	Report	Curran 17'; Mullan 27'; Hawkshaw 34'; McLoughlin 56'	Stadium: Tasmanian Hockey Centre

20 February 2026 Australia Leg	Australia	1–4	Spain	Hobart, Australia
19:30	Howell 10'	Report	Jimenez 6'; Rogoski 25'; Bosch 29'; Segu 53'	Stadium: Tasmanian Hockey Centre

22 February 2026 Australia Leg	Australia	1–3	China	Hobart, Australia
18:30	Cullum-Sanders 48'	Report	Wang 11'; Zeng 23'; Ying 27'	Stadium: Tasmanian Hockey Centre

23 February 2026 Australia Leg	Australia	2–2 (1–2 p)	Spain	Hobart, Australia
18:30	West 13'; Pickering 33'	Report	Mejías 48'; Giné 59'	Stadium: Tasmanian Hockey Centre
	Penalties
	Greiner (penalty shoot-out missed); Downes (penalty shoot-out scored); Cullum-Sanders (penalty shoot-out missed); Ward (penalty shoot-out missed); Schonell (penalty shoot-out missed)		(penalty shoot-out scored) P. Jiménez; (penalty shoot-out missed) Vidosa; (penalty shoot-out scored) Badia; (penalty shoot-out missed) L. Jiménez

25 February 2026 Australia Leg	Australia	1–3	China	Hobart, Australia
18:30	Sharman 40'	Report	Zhong 14'; Zou 17'; Zeng 44'	Stadium: Tasmanian Hockey Centre

==== FIH World Cup Qualifiers ====
2 March 2026 Pool A	Australia	4–0	France	Santiago, Chile
17:30	Flynn 8'; G. Stewart 19'; Kershaw 23'; Arnott 28'	Report

4 March 2026 Pool A	Chile	2–1	Australia	Santiago, Chile
15:45	Salas 42'; Maldonado 60+'	Report	Kershaw 46'

5 March 2026 Pool A	Australia	3–0	Switzerland	Santiago, Chile
17:30	Flynn 8', 51'; Howell 56'	Report

7 March 2026 Semi-final	Ireland	0–1	Australia	Santiago, Chile
18:00		Report	Colwill 28'

8 March 2026 Final	Chile	1–0	Australia	Santiago, Chile
20:15	A. Irazoqui 7'	Report

==== Unofficial practice matches ====
26 May 2026 IND Game 1	Australia	2–1	India	Perth, Australia
19:40	Wilson 36', 53'	Report	Navneet 13'

27 May 2026 IND Game 2	Australia	1–1	India	Perth, Australia
19:40	Downes 10'	Report	Sushila 46'

29 May 2026 IND Game 3	Australia	0–2	India	Perth, Australia
13:40		Report	Sonam 36'; Lalremsiami 49'

30 May 2026 IND Game 4	Australia	3–2	India	Perth, Australia
13:40	Wilson 42'; Downes 44'; Schonell 58'	Report	Navneet 2'; Deepika So. 23'

1 June 2026 USA Game 1	Australia	2–2	United States	Perth, Australia
14:45	Williams 12'; Arnott 20'	Report	Sessa 30+'; Dixon 44'

2 June 2026 USA Game 2	Australia	2–2	United States	Perth, Australia
14:45	Kershaw 13', 31'	Report	Adams 11'; Gladieux 42'

4 June 2026 USA Game 3	Australia	3–1	United States	Perth, Australia
10:45	Downes 23'; Mathison 44'; Young 59'	Report	24'

5 June 2026 USA Game 4	Australia	1–2	United States	Perth, Australia
10:45	47'	Report	11'; 50'

==== FIH Pro League ====
17 June 2026 England Leg	Germany	0–2	Australia	London, England
19:30		Report	Kershaw 20'; Arnott 26'	Stadium: Lee Valley Hockey Stadium

18 June 2026 England Leg	Australia	1–5	Germany	London, England
19:30	Downes 20'	Report	Fleschütz 8'; Hachenberg 10'; Wiedermann 12'; Nolte 40', 45'	Stadium: Lee Valley Hockey Stadium

20 June 2026 England Leg	England	0–3	Australia	London, England
15:00		Report	Colwill 9', 27'; Arnott 17'	Stadium: Lee Valley Hockey Stadium

21 June 2026 England Leg	England	2–2 (3–4 p)	Australia	London, England
14:00	Toman 2', 3'	Report	Kershaw 26', 32'	Stadium: Lee Valley Hockey Stadium
	Penalties
	Bourne (penalty shoot-out missed); Rayer (penalty shoot-out scored); Crackles (penalty shoot-out scored); Hamilton (penalty shoot-out missed); Owsley (penalty shoot-out missed); Bourne (penalty shoot-out scored); Rayer (penalty shoot-out missed); Crackles (penalty shoot-out missed); Hamilton (penalty shoot-out missed)		(penalty shoot-out scored) Kershaw; (penalty shoot-out missed) Williams; (penalty shoot-out missed) Lawton; (penalty shoot-out scored) Nobbs; (penalty shoot-out missed) Stewart; (penalty shoot-out scored) Nobbs; (penalty shoot-out missed) Kershaw; (penalty shoot-out missed) Williams; (penalty shoot-out scored) Lawton

23 June 2026 Belgium Leg	Belgium	1–1 (4–2 p)	Australia	Wavre, Belgium
20:30	S. Vanden Borre 1'	Report	Arnott 19'	Stadium: Stade Justin Peeters
	Penalties
	Verhees (penalty shoot-out scored); De Clerck (penalty shoot-out scored); D. Marien (penalty shoot-out scored); S. Vanden Borre (penalty shoot-out scored)		(penalty shoot-out scored) Arnott; (penalty shoot-out missed) Downes; (penalty shoot-out scored) Nobbs; (penalty shoot-out missed) Lawton

24 June 2026 Belgium Leg	Australia	0–6	Netherlands	Wavre, Belgium
18:30		Report	G. Moes 5'; P. Dicke 13', 33'; Matla 17'; Y. Jansen 30'; Post 54'	Stadium: Stade Justin Peeters

26 June 2026 Belgium Leg	Belgium	2–1	Australia	Wavre, Belgium
18:30	Englebert 10'; Belis 59'	Report	Stewart 22'	Stadium: Stade Justin Peeters

27 June 2026 Belgium Leg	Netherlands	1–1 (1–3 p)	Australia	Wavre, Belgium
16:30	Matla 26'	Report	Colwill 60'	Stadium: Stade Justin Peeters
	Penalties
	Sanders (penalty shoot-out missed); Matla (penalty shoot-out missed); F. Moes (penalty shoot-out scored); Van der Elst (penalty shoot-out missed)		(penalty shoot-out scored) Kershaw; (penalty shoot-out missed) Williams; (penalty shoot-out scored) Downes; (penalty shoot-out scored) Nobbs

==== Unofficial practice matches ====
28 July 2026 KOR Game 1	Australia	2–0	South Korea	Perth, Australia
15:45	Williams 30', 55'	Report

30 July 2026 KOR Game 2	Australia	3–0	South Korea	Perth, Australia
15:15	Lawton 15'; G. Stewart 18'; Colwill 23'	Report

31 July 2026 KOR Game 3	Australia	5–0	South Korea	Perth, Australia
16:45	Wilson 15'; Schonell 24'; Colwill 27'; Byrnes 28'; Kershaw 59'	Report

==== FIH World Cup ====
15 August 2026 Pool A	Australia	2–0	Japan	Amsterdam, Netherlands
10:00	Colwill 27', 51'	Report		Stadium: Wagener Stadium

17 August 2026 Pool A	Australia	2–4	Netherlands	Amsterdam, Netherlands
18:00	Kershaw 23'; Wilson 49'	Report	Jansen 13'; Burg 22', 52'; Veen 56'	Stadium: Wagener Stadium

19 August 2026 Pool A	Chile	4–4	Australia	Amsterdam, Netherlands
09:30	Müller 34'; Urroz 47'; Barrios 53'; Villagran 55'	Report	Schonell 30'; Wilson 41'; Colwill 52'; Williams 60'	Stadium: Wagener Stadium

21 August 2026 Pool E	China	1–1	Australia	Amsterdam, Netherlands
15:00	Zhang 39'	Report	Wilson 48'	Stadium: Wagener Stadium

23 August 2026 Pool E	Australia	0–0	India	Amsterdam, Netherlands
19:00		Report		Stadium: Wagener Stadium

27 August 2026 Semi-final	Argentina	1–0	Australia	Wavre, Belgium
20:30	Jankunas 47'	Report		Stadium: Belfius Hockey Arena

29 August 2026 Bronze medal match	Belgium	1–0	Australia	Amsterdam, Netherlands
13:00	Englebert 20'	Report		Stadium: Wagener Stadium

=== 2026 goalscorers ===
2026 goalscorers
Rank	Player	FG	PC	PS	Total
1	Claire Colwill	0	6	1	7
2	Stephanie Kershaw	5	1	0	6
3	Alice Arnott	3	1	0	4
4	Neasa Flynn	2	1	0	3
4	Abigail Wilson	0	1	2	3
5	Olivia Downes	2	0	0	2
5	Mihaylia Howell	1	1	0	2
5	Grace Stewart	1	1	0	2
8	Hannah Cullum-Sanders	1	0	0	1
8	Lexie Pickering	1	0	0	1
8	Courtney Schonell	0	1	0	1
8	Lucy Sharman	0	1	0	1
8	Georgina West	1	0	0	1
8	Mariah Williams	1	0	0	1
Total		18	14	3	35

== Other programs ==
=== National development squad ===
In addition to the core 24 player squad, Hockey Australia also maintains a 17 player development squad. The 2026 squad is as follows:

- Maddison Brooks
- Hannah Cullum-Sanders
- Dayle Dolkens
- Rebecca Greiner
- Bridget Laurance (GK)
- Phillipa Morgan
- Lexie Pickering
- Jesse Reid
- Courtney Schonell
- Jolie Sertorio
- Alyssa Smith (GK)
- Maddison Smith
- Georgina Smithers
- Jamie-Lee Surha
- Caitlyn Templeman
- Zali Ward
- Georgina West

== See also ==
- Kookaburras – Australia men's national field hockey team
- Australian field hockey players
- Australia women's national under-21 field hockey team
- Australian Hockey League
- Australia women's national indoor hockey team
