= Aisling Utri =

Australian rules footballer

Personal information
- Born: 21 March 1998 (age 28)
- Debut: Round 1, 2018, Western Bulldogs vs. Fremantle, at VU Whitten Oval
- Height: 165 cm (5 ft 5 in)
- Position: Midfielder

Club information
- Current club: Western Bulldogs
- Number: 23

Playing career^{1}
Years	Club	Games (Goals)
2018–2021	Western Bulldogs	14 (7)
- ^{1} Playing statistics correct to the end of the 2020 season.

Career highlights
- AFL Women's Rising Star nominee: 2018; AFL Women's Premiership Player: 2018

Aisling Utri (born 21 March 1998) is an Australian-born Irish International Field Hockey player and former Australian rules footballer.

She played with the Western Bulldogs in the AFL Women's from 2018 to 2020 helping them win the clubs first AFLW Premiership playing in the 2018 AFL Women's Grand Final.

Utri played with the Australian National Field Hockey Team before switching to Ireland in 2026 joining club Railway Union and making her Ireland debut in June 2026 before being called up to their squad for the 2026 World Cup.

== AFLW ==
Utri played for the Western Bulldogs in the AFL Women's (AFLW). Utri was recruited by the Western Bulldogs as a rookie signing in August 2017 due to her career in field hockey. She made her debut in the twenty-six point win against Fremantle at VU Whitten Oval in the opening round of the 2018 season. In round 4 Utri received a nomination for the 2018 AFL Women's Rising Star award after recording 18 disposals in her side's win over Carlton.

Utri played in the 2018 AFL Women's Grand Final helping the Bulldogs win their first Premiership

Utri played a total of 14 games scoring 7 goals, She announced she would sit out the 2020 season to focus on her Hockey career.

== Field Hockey ==
Aisling Utri
Personal information
- Born: 21 March 1998 (age 28)

Sport
- Sport: Field hockey
- Position: Striker
- Club: Railway Union
Senior career
Years	Team	Caps	Goals
2019–2025	Hockey Club Melbourne	30	11
2026–	Railway Union	9	17
National team
Years	Team	Caps	Goals
2019	Australia U21	4	(2)
2023	Australia	3	(1)
2026–	Ireland	12	(0)

Utri played for Australia at u21 level in 2019 before making her international debut in 2023 against India she went on to play 3 times for Australia scoring in a 4-2 win over India.

She played in Hockey One for Hockey Club Melbourne playing from 2019-2025 she played 30 times scoring 11 goals.

Utri moved to Ireland with her sister Ciara joining club Railway Union where she played in the Women's Euro Hockey League becoming the first player to play in the EHL and the AFLW and helped Railway win the AIG Irish Senior Cup for the third consecutive year and the Women's Irish Hockey League scoring 11 goals in just 6 league games.

Her Irish mother made her eligible to represent the Ireland national team she made her international debut against the Netherlands in the FIH Pro League.

She was called up to manager Gareth Grundie's squad for the 2026 World Cup in Wavre, Belgium and Amstelveen, Netherlands.

== Personal life ==
Her mother grew up in Dublin before moving to Melbourne in her late twenties, and the family frequently returned to Ireland during Aisling’s childhood.

Her younger sister Ciara is also a hockey player who has played for the Australia u21 National Team in Hockey and plays with Aisling at Railway Union.
