= Sydney Olympic Park Hockey Centre =

Multi-use stadium in Sydney, New South Wales, Australia

- State Hockey Centre
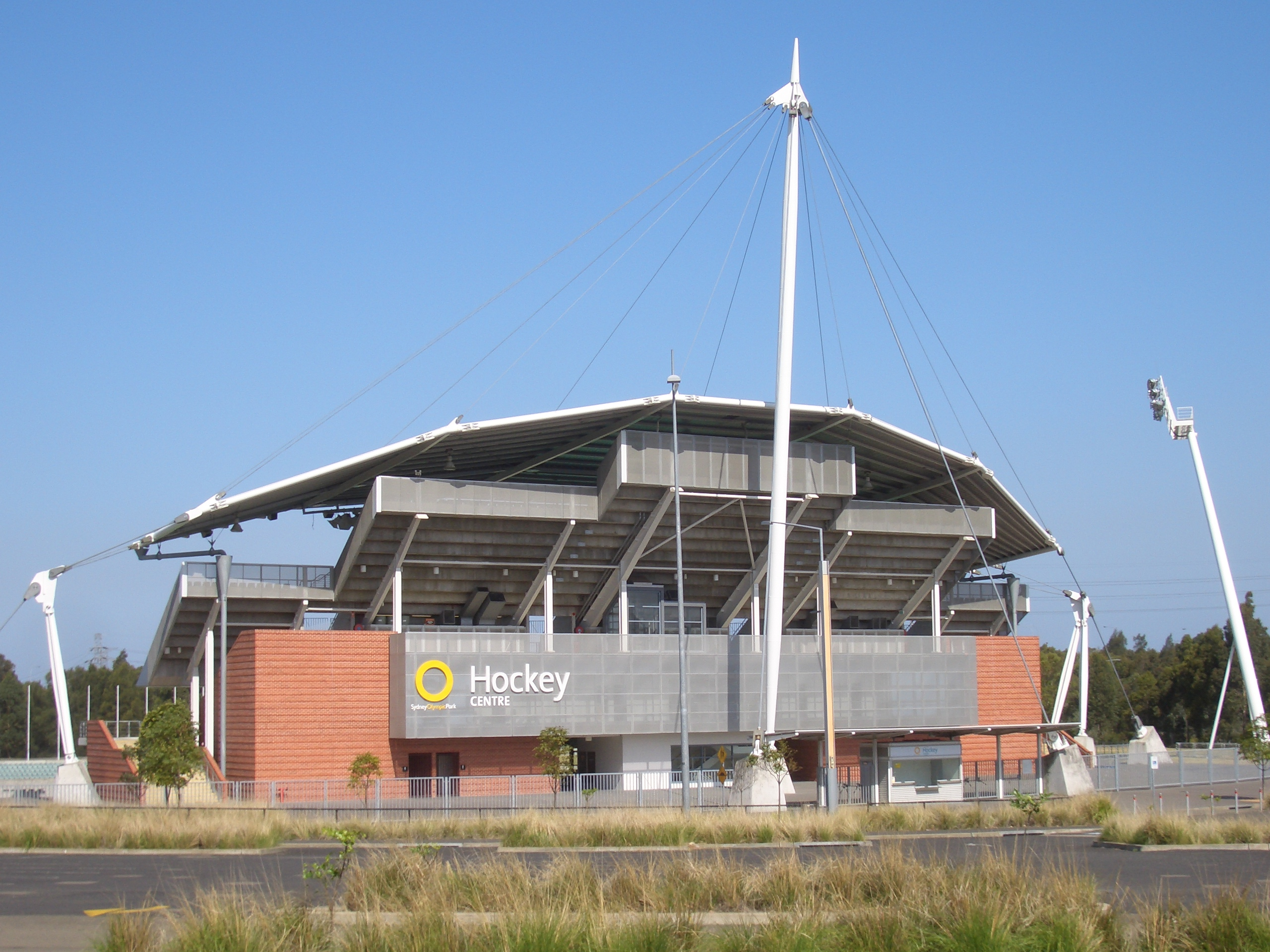
- Interactive map of Sydney Olympic Park Hockey Centre
- Location: Sydney Olympic Park, New South Wales, Sydney, NSW
- Coordinates: 33°51′18″S 151°4′5″E
- Owner: States Sport Centre Trust
- Capacity: 8,000
- Surface: Synthetic

Construction
- Groundbreaking: September 1996
- Opened: March 1998
- Cost: A$ 15.5m
- Architect: Ancher Mortlock Wooley

Tenants
- Hockey NSW; New South Wales Waratahs (AHL) (1998-present); New South Wales Arrows (AHL) (1998–present)

The Sydney Olympic Park Hockey Centre, also known as the State Hockey Centre of New South Wales, is a multi-use stadium in Sydney Olympic Park suburb of Sydney, New South Wales, Australia. It was built in 1998 to host the field hockey events at the 2000 Summer Olympics. Its current capacity is 8,000 people, with seating capacity for 4,000. For the Olympic Games capacity was boosted to 15,000 through the use of temporary stands.

== Usage ==
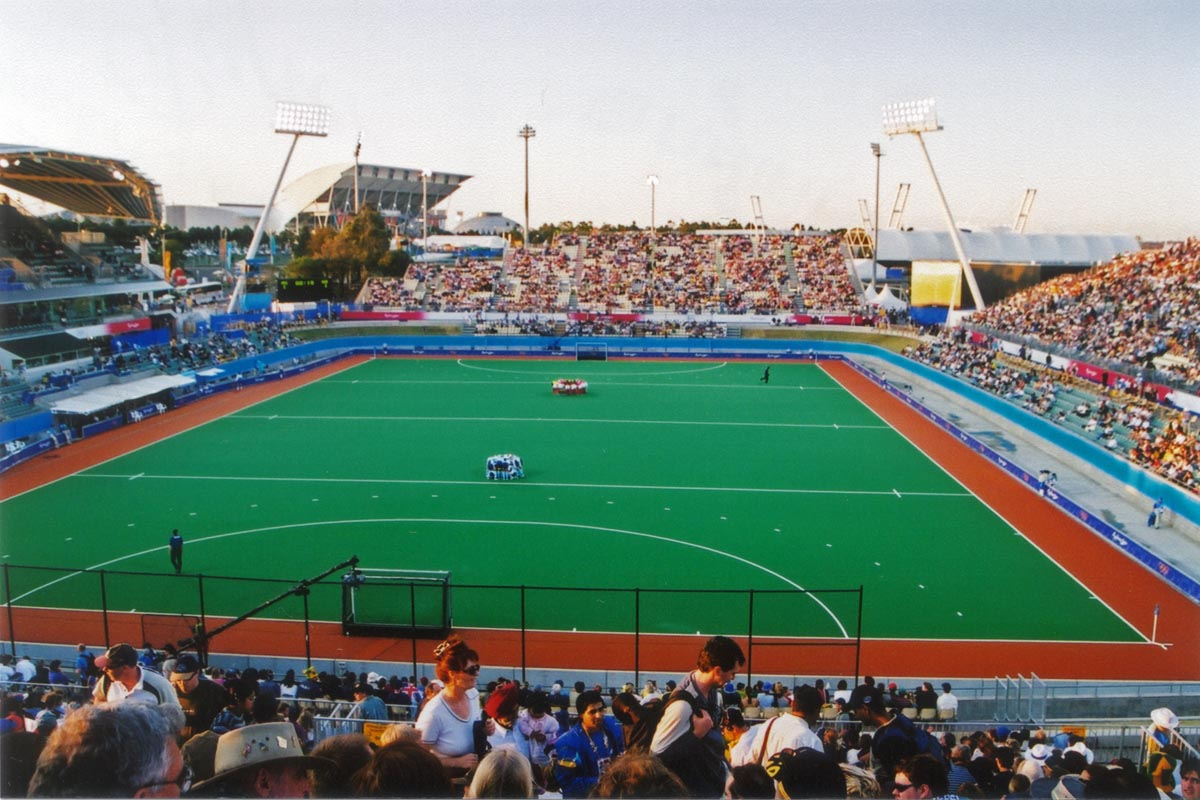
Sydney Olympic Park Hockey Centre during the 2000 Summer Olympics

The Sydney Olympic Park Hockey Centre is a premier field hockey facility, with the governing body of hockey in New South Wales, Hockey NSW being based there. The Sydney representatives of both the male and female versions of the semi professional Australian Hockey League, the New South Wales Waratahs and the New South Wales Arrows both play their home games at the stadium. The stadium also hosted the field hockey at the 2000 Summer Olympics, in which the Kookaburras, the men's Australian national hockey team, won the bronze medal, and the Hockeyroos, the woman's Australian national hockey team, won the gold medal for the third consecutive time. The women's field hockey final took place in front of a capacity crowd of 15,000.

At the Sydney Paralympic games in 2000, the Paralympic football 5 and 7-a-side games were played at the stadium. Other sports such as gridiron, touch football, Oztag and lacrosse have all been played at the stadium. The stadium has also been hired out by schools who require such a facility.

During the 2018 Invictus Games located in Sydney, archery was held on the second (original) field with entry via the Quaycentre.

== Facilities ==
The stadium contains two fields, one for warm-ups (of which is still used for lower competitions) with the other for actual competition. The surface of both these fields, resurfaced in 2008, are POLIGRAS Olympia 2008 which contain polyethylene yarn for improved durability, UV stability, optimum ball/surface interaction and significantly less water requirements. POLIGRAS uses 100% recycled rubber for the elastic layers and heavy-metal-free yarns for the playing surface and uses 30-40% less water than other surfaces available on the market at the time. The pitch is 91.44 metres long by 54.86 metres wide. The main grandstand was designed by architects Ancher Mortlock Wooley and has seating for 1,500 people. It has a roof resembling a soaring glider or sail that sits 25 metres above the ground. It is held up by a 41m high mast removing any requirement for columns, a design that gives spectators an uninterrupted view of the action on the pitch.

Other facilities available at the stadium include a conference room (Waratah) overlooking the Olympic Pitch, and the Eva Redfern Lounge (overlooking Pitch 2) also available for hire. The Olympic pitch also has a series of team changerooms, FA room, tournament and drug testing rooms. A kiosk and retail outlet are open during competition and tournament events. Being part of the Sydney Olympic Park sporting complex, it shares many other facilities with the rest of the complex and makes it easily accessible by bus, train, ferry and car.

== See also ==
- 2000 Summer Olympics venues
- List of sports venues in Australia
