= 2018 Under 18 Women's Australian Championships =

Tournament details
- Host country: Australia
- City: Launceston
- Teams: 10
- Venue(s): Launceston Hockey Centre

Final positions
- Champions: (New South Wales) NSW State
- Runner-up: (Western Australia) WA
- Third place: (Queensland) QLD Maroon

Tournament statistics
- Matches played: 32
- Goals scored: 161 (5.03 per match)
- Top scorer(s): (Queensland) Ruby Harris (11 goals)

The 2018 Women's Under 18 Australian Championships was a field hockey tournament held in the Tasmanian city of Launceston from 13–21 March.

NSW State won the gold medal, defeating WA 3–2 in the final. QLD Maroon won the bronze medal by defeating VIC 6–1 in the third place playoff.

== Teams ==
- (Australian Capital Territory) ACT
- (New South Wales) NSW Blue
- (New South Wales) NSW State
- (Northern Territory) NT
- (Queensland) QLD Gold
- (Queensland) QLD Maroon
- (South Australia) SA
- (Tasmania) TAS
- (Victoria (state)) VIC
- (Western Australia) WA

== Results ==
=== Preliminary round ===
- Each team played one crossover match; points have been added to teams' respective pools.

==== Pool A ====
Pos	Team	Pld	W	D	L	GF	GA	GD	Pts	Qualification
1	(Queensland) QLD Maroon	5	4	0	1	31	7	+24	12	Advance to Semi-finals
2	(Victoria (state)) VIC	5	3	1	1	19	10	+9	10	Advance to Semi-finals
3	(South Australia) SA	5	2	0	3	14	15	−1	6	
4	(Tasmania) TAS	5	0	2	3	4	21	−17	2	
5	(Northern Territory) NT	5	0	2	3	2	24	−22	2	

Source: Hockey Australia
Rules for classification: 1) points; 2) matches won; 3) goal difference; 4) goals for; 5) head-to-head result; 6) field goals scored.

13 March 2018
14:30

QLD Maroon (Queensland)	1–3	(New South Wales) NSW State
Office 12'	Report	Bradley 20'; Schonell 44'; Tobbe 66'

Umpires:
Cassidy Gallagher (AUS)
Lauren Berndt (AUS)

13 March 2018
16:15

TAS (Tasmania)	1–4	(South Australia) SA
Williams 38'	Report	Lewis 24'; Goldsmith 30'; De Broughe 44'; Hoffman 62'

Umpires:
Jessica Edwards (AUS)
Jessica Fox (AUS)

13 March 2018
18:00

VIC (Victoria (state))	5–0	(Northern Territory) NT
Downes 24', 35+', 37'; Utri 46'; Lawton 67'	Report

Umpires:
Peta Wallison (AUS)
Emily Nunn (AUS)

14 March 2018
15:00

TAS (Tasmania)	0–3	(New South Wales) NSW Blue
	Report	Askey 2'; Croker 33'; Watts 53'

Umpires:
Emily Ogden (AUS)
Jessica Currie (AUS)

14 March 2018
16:45

VIC (Victoria (state))	5–0	(South Australia) SA
Morris 17'; Hamilton-Smith 20'; Utri 40'; Florey 45'; Moore 68'	Report

Umpires:
Claudia Hartas (AUS)
Lauren Moore (AUS)

14 March 2018
18:30

QLD Maroon (Queensland)	9–0	(Northern Territory) NT
D. Dolkens 4', 58'; L-B. Smith 8'; Harris 14', 18', 45'; Office 31'; C. Dolkens 35+'; Mathison 42'	Report

Umpires:
Jessica Edwards (AUS)
Emily Ogden (AUS)

15 March 2018
14:30

VIC (Victoria (state))	4–3	(Western Australia) WA
Downes 23', 38'; Florey 47'; Morris 47'	Report	Flynn 19', 41'; Dowd 61'

Umpires:
Cassidy Gallagher (AUS)
Peta Wallison (AUS)

15 March 2018
16:15

TAS (Tasmania)	0–11	(Queensland) QLD Maroon
	Report	Harris 10', 28', 49', 61'; D. Dolkens 27', 33', 59'; Office 35', 39'; J. Smith 42'; Mathison 66'

Umpires:
Jessica Currie (AUS)
Jessica Edwards (AUS)

15 March 2018
18:00

SA (South Australia)	9–1	(Northern Territory) NT
Higgins 11', 19'; De Broughe 15', 32', 40'; Shand 21'; Cameron 24'; Lewis 35+'; Griffin 62'	Report	Knowles 16'

Umpires:
Jessica Fox (AUS)
Lauren Berndt (AUS)

17 March 2018
10:30

VIC (Victoria (state))	3–5	(Queensland) QLD Maroon
Downes 13'; Moore 35', 70'	Report	J. Smith 11', 39'; Reid 29'; Office 52'; Fitzpatrick 63'

Umpires:
Jessica Edwards (AUS)
Claudia Hartas (AUS)

17 March 2018
12:15

NT (Northern Territory)	1–1	(Tasmania) TAS
Kleidon 24'	Report	Phillips 67'

Umpires:
Lauren Berndt (AUS)
Peta Wallison (AUS)

17 March 2018
14:00

SA (South Australia)	0–3	(Queensland) QLD Gold
	Report	S. Staples 31'; Walker 64'; Best 66'

Umpires:
Alissia Pearson (AUS)
Cassidy Gallagher (AUS)

18 March 2018
12:40

QLD Maroon (Queensland)	5–1	(South Australia) SA
Fitzpatrick 6'; Harris 9', 10'; J. Smith 17'; D. Dolkens 24'	Report	Hoffman 22'

Umpires:
Claudia Hartas (AUS)
Alissia Pearson (AUS)

18 March 2018
14:25

TAS (Tasmania)	2–2	(Victoria (state)) VIC
Bridley 14', 18'	Report	Colasurdo 51'; Lawton 60'

Umpires:
Lauren Berndt (AUS)
Jessica Currie (AUS)

18 March 2018
16:10

NT (Northern Territory)	0–0	(Australian Capital Territory) ACT
	Report

Umpires:
Jessica Edwards (AUS)
Peta Wallison (AUS)

==== Pool B ====
Pos	Team	Pld	W	D	L	GF	GA	GD	Pts	Qualification
1	(New South Wales) NSW State	5	4	1	0	29	4	+25	13	Advance to Semi-finals
2	(Western Australia) WA	5	3	1	1	16	6	+10	10	Advance to Semi-finals
3	(Queensland) QLD Gold	5	3	0	2	8	13	−5	9	
4	(New South Wales) NSW Blue	5	1	1	3	7	17	−10	4	
5	(Australian Capital Territory) ACT	5	0	2	3	1	14	−13	2	

Source: Hockey Australia
Rules for classification: 1) points; 2) matches won; 3) goal difference; 4) goals for; 5) head-to-head result; 6) field goals scored.

13 March 2018
11:00

WA (Western Australia)	5–0	(Australian Capital Territory) ACT
Dowd 11', 40'; Snyman 25', 58'; Vanderzwan 49'	Report

Umpires:
Alissia Pearson (AUS)
Emily Ogden (AUS)

13 March 2018
12:45

NSW Blue (New South Wales)	1–3	(Queensland) QLD Gold
Askey 49'	Report	S. Staples 19'; Reid 24'; Best 47'

Umpires:
Claudia Hartas (AUS)
Jessica Currie (AUS)

13 March 2018
14:30

QLD Maroon (Queensland)	1–3	(New South Wales) NSW State
Office 12'	Report	Bradley 20'; Schonell 44'; Tobbe 66'

Umpires:
Cassidy Gallagher (AUS)
Lauren Berndt (AUS)

14 March 2018
11:30

WA (Western Australia)	4–1	(Queensland) QLD Gold
Flynn 7', 53'; Vanderzwan 38'; Sertorio 44'	Report	Best 45'

Umpires:
Cassidy Gallagher (AUS)
Emily Nunn (AUS)

14 March 2018
13:15

NSW State (New South Wales)	7–0	(Australian Capital Territory) ACT
Smith 13', 41'; Toohey 28'; Kable 35+'; Schonell 38'; Callander 53'; Tobbe 66'	Report

Umpires:
Alissia Pearson (AUS)
Peta Wallison (AUS)

14 March 2018
15:00

TAS (Tasmania)	0–3	(New South Wales) NSW Blue
	Report	Askey 2'; Croker 33'; Watts 53'

Umpires:
Emily Ogden (AUS)
Jessica Currie (AUS)

15 March 2018
11:00

NSW Blue (New South Wales)	2–10	(New South Wales) NSW State
Askey 13'; Smith 24'	Report	Pickering 3'; Toohey 17', 56'; Schonell 20'; Callander 29', 54'; Young 37'; Smith 57'; Johnston 62'; Kable 70'

Umpires:
Emily Ogden (AUS)
Emily Nunn (AUS)

15 March 2018
12:45

QLD Gold (Queensland)	1–0	(Australian Capital Territory) ACT
Chappell 70+'	Report

Umpires:
Alissia Pearson (AUS)
Claudia Hartas (AUS)

15 March 2018
14:30

VIC (Victoria (state))	4–3	(Western Australia) WA
Downes 23', 38'; Florey 47'; Morris 47'	Report	Flynn 19', 41'; Dowd 61'

Umpires:
Cassidy Gallagher (AUS)
Peta Wallison (AUS)

17 March 2018
14:00

SA (South Australia)	0–3	(Queensland) QLD Gold
	Report	S. Staples 31'; Walker 64'; Best 66'

Umpires:
Alissia Pearson (AUS)
Cassidy Gallagher (AUS)

17 March 2018
15:45

WA (Western Australia)	1–1	(New South Wales) NSW State
DeSilva 4'	Report	Kable 7'

Umpires:
Emily Ogden (AUS)
Jessica Fox (AUS)

17 March 2018
17:30

ACT (Australian Capital Territory)	1–1	(New South Wales) NSW Blue
S. Sutherland 45'	Report	Osborne 29'

Umpires:
Jessica Currie (AUS)
Cassidy Gallagher (AUS)

18 March 2018
16:10

NT (Northern Territory)	0–0	(Australian Capital Territory) ACT
	Report

Umpires:
Jessica Edwards (AUS)
Peta Wallison (AUS)

18 March 2018
17:55

NSW State (New South Wales)	8–0	(Queensland) QLD Gold
Schonell 20', 33', 58'; Johnston 42', 69'; Pickering 44'; Kable 45'; Smith 64'	Report

Umpires:
Cassidy Gallagher (AUS)
Jessica Fox (AUS)

18 March 2018
19:40

NSW Blue (New South Wales)	0–3	(Western Australia) WA
	Report	Snyman 17', 66'; Vanderzwan 51'

Umpires:
Lauren Berndt (AUS)
Emily Ogden (AUS)

=== Classification round ===
==== Fifth to tenth place classification ====
===== Ninth and tenth place =====
20 March 2018
14:00

NT (Northern Territory)	1–4	(Australian Capital Territory) ACT
Cronje 58'	Report	Bowles 2'; Dooley 37'; Martin 66'; Sheargold 67'

Umpires:
Jessica Currie (AUS)
Emily Nunn (AUS)

===== Seventh and eighth place =====
20 March 2018
16:00

TAS (Tasmania)	0–1	(New South Wales) NSW Blue
	Report	Sandy 38'

Umpires:
Jessica Fox (AUS)
Peta Wallison (AUS)

===== Fifth and sixth place =====
20 March 2018
18:00

SA (South Australia)	1–5	(Queensland) QLD Gold
Cameron 52'	Report	Chappell 24'; Reid 25'; Best 27'; J. Staples 48'; Punch 55'

Umpires:
Jessica Edwards (AUS)
Claudia Hartas (AUS)

==== First to fourth place classification ====
Semi-Finals
20 March 2018
(Queensland) QLD Maroon	2 (1)
(Western Australia) WA (pen.)	2 (3)
20 March 2018
(New South Wales) NSW State	2
(Victoria (state)) VIC	0

Final
21 March 2018
(Western Australia) WA	2
(New South Wales) NSW State	3
Third place
21 March 2018
(Queensland) QLD Maroon	6
(Victoria (state)) VIC	1

===== Semi-finals =====
20 March 2018
10:00

QLD Maroon (Queensland)	2–2	(Western Australia) WA
D. Dolkens 26'; J. Smith 38'	Report	Hutton 11'; Flynn 33'
Penalties
D. Dolkens (penalty shoot-out missed); Mathison (penalty shoot-out scored); Fitzpatrick (penalty shoot-out missed); Brown (penalty shoot-out missed)	1–3	(penalty shoot-out scored) Hutton; (penalty shoot-out scored) Vanderzwan; (penalty shoot-out scored) Sertorio; (penalty shoot-out missed) Flynn

Umpires:
Cassidy Gallagher (AUS)
Alissia Pearson (AUS)

20 March 2018
12:00

NSW State (New South Wales)	2–0	(Victoria (state)) VIC
Callander 29'; Bradley 69'	Report

Umpires:
Lauren Berndt (AUS)
Emily Ogden (AUS)

===== Third and fourth place =====
21 March 2018
11:15

QLD Maroon (Queensland)	6–1	(Victoria (state)) VIC
Fitzpatrick 2', 51'; Harris 19', 54'; L-B. Smith 49'; Brown 51'	Report	Colasurdo 54'

Umpires:
Emily Ogden (AUS)
Alissia Pearson (AUS)

===== Final =====
21 March 2018
10:00

WA (Western Australia)	2–3	(New South Wales) NSW State
Vanderzwan 25'; Dowd 66'	Report	Kable 14'; Smith 45'; Tobbe 50'

Umpires:
Lauren Berndt (AUS)
Cassidy Gallagher (AUS)

== Statistics ==
=== Final standings ===
Pos	Team	Pld	W	D	L	GF	GA	GD	Pts	Final Result
1st place, gold medalist(s)	(New South Wales) NSW State	7	6	1	0	34	6	+28	19	Gold Medal
2nd place, silver medalist(s)	(Western Australia) WA	7	3	2	2	20	11	+9	11	Silver Medal
3rd place, bronze medalist(s)	(Queensland) QLD Maroon	7	5	1	1	39	10	+29	16	Bronze Medal
4	(Victoria (state)) VIC	7	3	1	3	20	18	+2	10	
5	(Queensland) QLD Gold	6	4	0	2	13	14	−1	12	
6	(South Australia) SA	6	2	0	4	15	20	−5	6	
7	(New South Wales) NSW Blue	6	2	1	3	8	17	−9	7	
8	(Tasmania) TAS	6	0	2	4	4	22	−18	2	
9	(Australian Capital Territory) ACT	6	1	2	3	5	15	−10	5	
10	(Northern Territory) NT	6	0	2	4	3	28	−25	2	

Source: Hockey Australia
