= 2016 Under 18 Women's Australian Championships =

Tournament details
- Host country: Australia
- City: Launceston
- Teams: 11
- Venue(s): Northern Hockey Centre

Final positions
- Champions: (Queensland) QLD 1
- Runner-up: (New South Wales) NSW State
- Third place: (Western Australia) WA

Tournament statistics
- Matches played: 35
- Goals scored: 161 (4.6 per match)
- Top scorer(s): (New South Wales) Alice Arnott (Victoria (state)) Bethany Russ (9 goals)

The 2016 Women's Under 18 Australian Championships was the a field hockey tournament held in the Tasmania city of Launceston between 8–17 July 2016.

Queensland 1 won the gold medal by defeating New South Wales State 2–1 in the final. Western Australia won the bronze medal by defeating Victoria Blue 3–0 in the third and fourth place playoff.

== Competition format ==
The tournament is divided into two pools, Pool A and Pool B, consisting of five and six teams respectively, competing in a round-robin format.

At the conclusion of the pool stage, the top two teams of Pools A and B progress through to the semi-finals, where the top placed teams of each pool compete against the second placed team of each pool, with the winners progressing to the final.

The third and fourth placed teams then progress to the fifth to eighth place classification, while the bottom placed teams progress to Pool C (carrying over points) for the ninth to eleventh place classification.

== Teams ==
Unlike other National Australian Championships, teams from New South Wales, Queensland and Victoria are eligible to enter two teams.

- (Australian Capital Territory) ACT
- (New South Wales) NSW State
- (New South Wales) NSW Blue
- (Northern Territory) NT
- (Queensland) QLD 1
- (Queensland) QLD 2
- (South Australia) SA
- (Tasmania) TAS
- (Victoria (state)) VIC Blue
- (Victoria (state)) VIC White
- (Western Australia) WA

== Results ==
=== First round ===
==== Pool A ====
Pos	Team	Pld	W	D	L	GF	GA	GD	Pts	Qualification
1	(New South Wales) NSW State	4	4	0	0	21	3	+18	12	Advance to Semi-finals
2	(Queensland) QLD 1	4	3	0	1	15	2	+13	9	Advance to Semi-finals
3	(South Australia) SA	4	2	0	2	10	6	+4	6	
4	(Australian Capital Territory) ACT	4	1	0	3	2	16	−14	3	
5	(Victoria (state)) VIC White	4	0	0	4	0	21	−21	0	

Source: Hockey Australia

8 July 2016
09:00

QLD 1 (Queensland)	6 – 0	(Australian Capital Territory) ACT
Wollstein 10', 56'; McLaren 43'; McBurnie 52'; Nicholls 54'; Livesey 60'	Report

Northern Hockey Centre
Umpires:
Kiahni Abell (AUS)
Brydie Wellham (AUS)

8 July 2016
11:00

VIC White (Victoria (state))	0 – 10	(New South Wales) NSW State
	Report	Wilson 20', 22'; Arnott 32', 43', 45', 68'; Steel 57', 58'; Blamey 60'; Constance 66'

Northern Hockey Centre
Umpires:
Emily Ogden (AUS)
Chantel Manhire (AUS)

9 July 2016
09:30

VIC White (Victoria (state))	0 – 6	(Queensland) QLD 1
	Report	Wollstein 7', 25', 55'; McBurnie 15', 49'; Smart 44'

Northern Hockey Centre
Umpires:
Kimberleigh Todd (AUS)
Cassidy Gallagher (AUS)

9 July 2016
11:30

SA (South Australia)	4 – 1	(Australian Capital Territory) ACT
Herbert 2', 44'; Lewis 39'; Holland-Smith 69'	Report	Ronnfeldt 20'

Northern Hockey Centre
Umpires:
Jessica Fox (AUS)
Monique Yearbury (AUS)

10 July 2016
09:00

NSW State (New South Wales)	6 – 0	(Australian Capital Territory) ACT
Steel 7'; Constance 9'; Arnott 17'; Delbridge 33', 46'; Chaffey 68'	Report

Northern Hockey Centre
Umpires:
Miranda McNamara (AUS)
Alissia Pearson (AUS)

10 July 2016
11:00

QLD 1 (Queensland)	2 – 0	(South Australia) SA
Wollstein 38'; Malone 49'	Report

Northern Hockey Centre
Umpires:
Nicola Brown (AUS)
Emily Ogden (AUS)

13 July 2016
15:00

QLD 1 (Queensland)	1 – 2	(New South Wales) NSW State
McLaren 44'	Report	Corcoran 8'; Radcliffe 19'

Northern Hockey Centre
Umpires:
Nicola Brown (AUS)
Kimberleigh Todd (AUS)

13 July 2016
17:00

VIC White (Victoria (state))	0 – 4	(South Australia) SA
	Report	Shand 7'; Lewis 9', 16'; Cameron 29'

Northern Hockey Centre
Umpires:
Miranda McNamara (AUS)
Cassidy Gallagher (AUS)

14 July 2016
13:30

ACT (Australian Capital Territory)	1 – 0	(Victoria (state)) VIC White
Deacon 35'	Report

Northern Hockey Centre
Umpires:
Emily Ogden (AUS)
Alissia Pearson (AUS)

14 July 2016
15:30

NSW State (New South Wales)	3 – 2	(South Australia) SA
Arnott 5', 18'; Steel 11'	Report	Shand 9'; Lewis 50'

Northern Hockey Centre
Umpires:
Miranda McNamara (AUS)
Kimberleigh Todd (AUS)

==== Pool B ====
Pos	Team	Pld	W	D	L	GF	GA	GD	Pts	Qualification
1	(Victoria (state)) VIC Blue	5	5	0	0	19	4	+15	15	Advance to Semi-finals
2	(Western Australia) WA	5	4	0	1	19	8	+11	12	Advance to Semi-finals
3	(Queensland) QLD 2	5	2	0	3	11	14	−3	6	
4	(New South Wales) NSW Blue	5	1	1	3	12	14	−2	4	
5	(Tasmania) TAS	5	1	1	3	8	11	−3	4	
6	(Northern Territory) NT	5	0	2	3	4	22	−18	2	

Source: Hockey Australia

8 July 2016
13:00

NSW Blue (New South Wales)	6 – 1	(Queensland) QLD 2
Donnolley 14'; Smith 22', 23', 55'; Callander 57', 66'	Report	O'Brien 17'

Northern Hockey Centre
Umpires:
Alissia Pearson (AUS)
Kimberleigh Todd (AUS)

8 July 2016
15:00

VIC Blue (Victoria (state))	2 – 1	(Tasmania) TAS
Lendon 30'; Russ 35'	Report	Haas 48'

Northern Hockey Centre
Umpires:
Jessica Fox (AUS)
Miranda McNamara (AUS)

8 July 2016
17:00

NT (Northern Territory)	0 – 5	(Western Australia) WA
	Report	Rockliff 17'; Rogers-Uff 19'; Hutton 20'; Morgan 32'; Gibbs 47'

Northern Hockey Centre
Umpires:
Nicola Brown (AUS)
Cassidy Gallagher (AUS)

9 July 2016
13:30

NT (Northern Territory)	0 – 10	(Victoria (state)) VIC Blue
	Report	Downes 8'; Russ 12', 34', 62'; Lendon 14'; Robinson 16'; James 48'; Hopkins 51', 55'; Anderson 68'

Northern Hockey Centre
Umpires:
Emily Ogden (AUS)
Brydie Wellham (AUS)

9 July 2016
15:30

NSW Blue (New South Wales)	1 – 3	(Tasmania) TAS
Hardy 24'	Report	Paynter 32'; Haas 65', 69'

Northern Hockey Centre
Umpires:
Chantel Manhire (AUS)
Nicola Brown (AUS)

9 July 2016
17:30

QLD 2 (Queensland)	2 – 3	(Western Australia) WA
Brown 21'; McCann 47'	Report	Nelson 12', 65'; Fidoe 63'

Northern Hockey Centre
Umpires:
Alissia Pearson (AUS)
Kiahni Abell (AUS)

10 July 2016
13:00

QLD 2 (Queensland)	4 – 1	(Northern Territory) NT
Punch 7'; Saddler 29'; Hess 43'; Kenway 67'	Report	Lidbetter 38'

Northern Hockey Centre
Umpires:
Jessica Fox (AUS)
Brydie Wellham (AUS)

10 July 2016
15:00

WA (Western Australia)	4 – 2	(Tasmania) TAS
Gibbs 11', 20', 58'; Fidoe 67'	Report	O'Conor 47'; Haas 63'

Northern Hockey Centre
Umpires:
Chantel Manhire (AUS)
Kimberleigh Todd (AUS)

10 July 2016
17:00

VIC Blue (Victoria (state))	2 – 1	(New South Wales) NSW Blue
Russ 29', 60'	Report	Callander 54'

Northern Hockey Centre
Umpires:
Monique Yearbury (AUS)
Cassidy Gallagher (AUS)

12 July 2016
09:30

TAS (Tasmania)	2 – 2	(Northern Territory) NT
Lewis 39'; Wootton 58'	Report	Lidbetter 55'; Butterworth 62'

Northern Hockey Centre
Umpires:
Nicola Brown (AUS)
Monique Yearbury (AUS)

13 July 2016
09:00

VIC Blue (Victoria (state))	1 – 0	(Western Australia) WA
Downes 20'	Report

Northern Hockey Centre
Umpires:
Monique Yearbury (AUS)
Emily Ogden (AUS)

13 July 2016
11:00

TAS (Tasmania)	0 – 2	(Queensland) QLD 2
	Report	Conway 18'; Punch 68'

Northern Hockey Centre
Umpires:
Chantel Manhire (AUS)
Brydie Wellham (AUS)

13 July 2016
13:00

NT (Northern Territory)	1 – 1	(New South Wales) NSW Blue
Lidbetter 33'	Report	Smith 70'

Northern Hockey Centre
Umpires:
Alissia Pearson (AUS)
Jessica Fox (AUS)

14 July 2016
09:30

QLD 2 (Queensland)	2 – 4	(Victoria (state)) VIC Blue
Conway 8'; McIntyre 53'	Report	Russ 32', 33', 49'; Hopkins 68'

Northern Hockey Centre
Umpires:
Cassidy Gallagher (AUS)
Brydie Wellham (AUS)

14 July 2016
11:30

WA (Western Australia)	7 – 3	(New South Wales) NSW Blue
Nelson 9', 20'; Morgan 22'; Gibbs 26'; Barbetti 29'; Barrett 37'; Somerville 61'	Report	Waddell 58'; Hardy 58'; Lee 64'

Northern Hockey Centre
Umpires:
Chantel Manhire (AUS)
Jessica Fox (AUS)

=== Second round ===
==== Ninth to eleventh place classification ====
===== Pool C =====
Pos	Team	Pld	W	D	L	GF	GA	GD	Pts
1	(Tasmania) TAS	2	1	1	0	8	3	+5	4
2	(Northern Territory) NT	2	1	1	0	6	2	+4	4
3	(Victoria (state)) VIC White	2	0	0	2	1	10	−9	0

Source: Hockey Australia

16 July 2016
09:30

VIC White (Victoria (state))	0 – 4	(Northern Territory) NT
	Report	Lidbetter 23'; Butterworth 41', 56', 69'

Northern Hockey Centre
Umpires:
Emily Nunn (AUS)
Jessica Fox (AUS)

17 July 2016
11:00

VIC White (Victoria (state))	1 – 6	(Tasmania) TAS
Head 70'	Report	Scutt 6', 27', 46', 49'; Haas 17'; Lewis 54'

Northern Hockey Centre
Umpires:
Emily Nunn (AUS)
Angela May (AUS)

==== Fifth to eighth place classification ====
Crossover
16 July 2016
(South Australia) SA	2
(New South Wales) NSW Blue	5
16 July 2016
(Queensland) QLD 2	4
(Australian Capital Territory) ACT	1

Fifth and sixth place
17 July 2016
(New South Wales) NSW Blue	2
(Queensland) QLD 2	2
Seventh and eighth place
17 July 2016
(South Australia) SA	0
(Australian Capital Territory) ACT	2

===== Crossover =====
16 July 2016
11:30

SA (South Australia)	2 – 5	(New South Wales) NSW Blue
Lewis 17'; Newton 48'	Report	Smith 10'; Hughes 15'; Bosman 23'; Hemmingway 25'; Johnston 70'

Northern Hockey Centre
Umpires:
Brydie Wellham (AUS)
Miranda McNamara (AUS)

16 July 2016
13:30

QLD 2 (Queensland)	4 – 1	(Australian Capital Territory) ACT
Conway 3', 70'; Hess 15', 21'	Report	Williams 42'

Northern Hockey Centre
Umpires:
Caissidy Gallagher (AUS)
Alissia Pearson (AUS)

===== Seventh and eighth place =====
17 July 2016
13:00

SA (South Australia)	0 – 2	(Australian Capital Territory) ACT
	Report	Deacon 3', 8'

Northern Hockey Centre
Umpires:
Caissidy Gallagher (AUS)
Brydie Wellham (AUS)

===== Fifth and sixth place =====
17 July 2016
09:30

NSW Blue (New South Wales)	2 – 2	(Queensland) QLD 2
Lee 59'; Waddell 62'	Report	Punch 35+', 41'

Northern Hockey Centre
Umpires:
Alissia Pearson (AUS)
Miranda McNamara (AUS)

==== First to fourth place classification ====
Semi-finals
16 July 2016
(New South Wales) NSW State	2
(Western Australia) WA	0
16 July 2016
(Victoria (state)) VIC Blue	1
(Queensland) QLD 1	2

Final
17 July 2016
(New South Wales) NSW State	1
(Queensland) QLD 1	2
Third and fourth place
17 July 2016
(Western Australia) WA	3
(Victoria (state)) VIC Blue	0

===== Semi-finals =====
16 July 2016
15:30

NSW State (New South Wales)	2 – 0	(Western Australia) WA
Arnott 15', 58'	Report

Northern Hockey Centre
Umpires:
Nicola Brown (AUS)
Emily Ogden (AUS)

16 July 2016
17:30

VIC Blue (Victoria (state))	1 – 2	(Queensland) QLD 1
Utri FG'	Report	Eleison 32'; Malone 59'

Northern Hockey Centre
Umpires:
Kimberleigh Todd (AUS)
Chantel Manhire (AUS)

===== Third and fourth place =====
17 July 2016
13:45

WA (Western Australia)	3 – 0	(Victoria (state)) VIC Blue
Fidoe 10'; Somerville 50'; Rogers-Uff 70'	Report

Northern Hockey Centre
Umpires:
Chantel Manhire (AUS)
Emily Ogden (AUS)

===== Final =====
17 July 2016
16:00

NSW State (New South Wales)	1 – 2	(Queensland) QLD 1
Martin 62'	Report	Malone 24'; Livesey 38'

Northern Hockey Centre
Umpires:
Kimberleigh Todd (AUS)
Nicola Brown (AUS)

== Statistics ==
=== Final standings ===
Pos	Team	Pld	W	D	L	GF	GA	GD	Pts	Final Result
1st place, gold medalist(s)	(Queensland) QLD 1	6	5	0	1	19	4	+15	15	Gold Medal
2nd place, silver medalist(s)	(New South Wales) NSW State	6	5	0	1	24	5	+19	15	Silver Medal
3rd place, bronze medalist(s)	(Western Australia) WA	7	5	0	2	22	10	+12	15	Bronze Medal
4	(Victoria (state)) VIC Blue	7	5	0	2	20	9	+11	15	Fourth Place
5	(Queensland) QLD 2	7	3	1	3	17	17	0	10	Fifth place
6	(New South Wales) NSW Blue	7	2	2	3	19	18	+1	8	Sixth Place
7	(Australian Capital Territory) ACT	6	2	0	4	5	20	−15	6	Seventh Place
8	(South Australia) SA	6	2	0	4	12	13	−1	6	Eighth Place
9	(Tasmania) TAS	6	2	1	3	14	12	+2	7	Ninth Place
10	(Northern Territory) NT	6	1	2	3	8	22	−14	5	Tenth Place
11	(Victoria (state)) VIC White	6	0	0	6	1	31	−30	0	Eleventh Place

Source: Hockey Australia
