= Sophie McDonald =

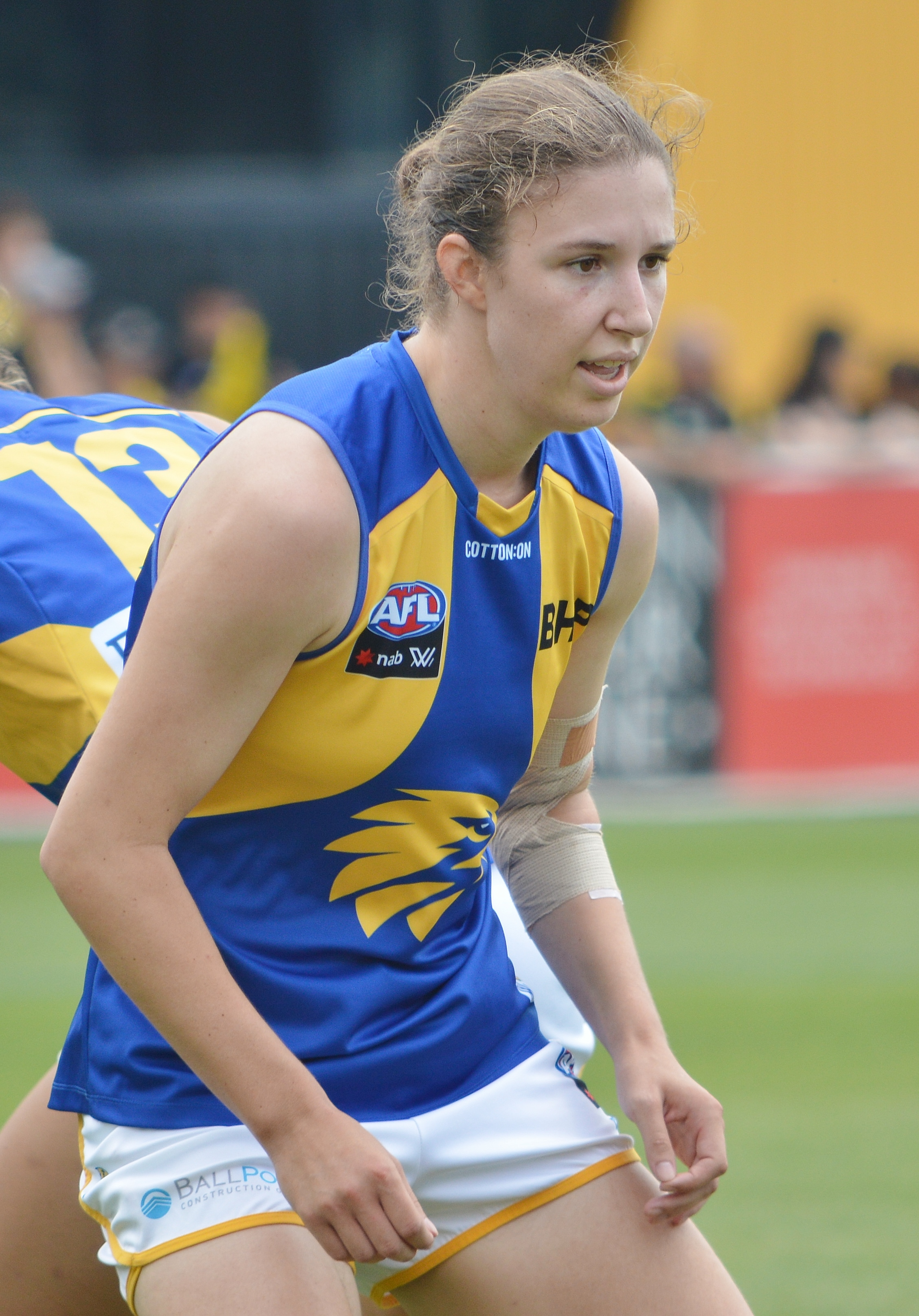
- McDonald with West Coast in 2020

Personal information
- Born: 8 June 2000 (age 26)
- Original team: Claremont (WAFLW)
- Draft: No. 39, 2019 national draft
- Debut: Round 1, 2020, West Coast vs. Collingwood, at Victoria Park
- Height: 181 cm (5 ft 11 in)
- Position: Key defender

Club information
- Current club: West Coast
- Number: 35

Playing career^{1}
Years	Club	Games (Goals)
2020–	West Coast	36 (0)
- ^{1} Playing statistics correct to the end of the 2023 season.

Sophie McDonald (born 8 June 2000) is an Australian rules footballer playing for the West Coast Eagles in the AFL Women's (AFLW). A key defender, she played state-level hockey as a junior before starting football in 2018. She made her senior debut in West Coast's inaugural AFLW team.

== Junior career ==
Originally from Albany, Western Australia, McDonald played hockey for most of her junior career. She represented her state at two under-18 national championships: the 2017 edition in Hobart, where she won bronze, and the 2018 edition in Launceston, where she won silver. She began playing football that year, joining West Coast's female academy in October after performing strongly at a club tryout for non-footballers.

McDonald, on a gap year, moved to Perth in early 2019, where she played both hockey and football at a high level, citing her enjoyment of both sports and the potential financial benefits of football. She represented the Suburbans Lions in the women's state hockey league and Claremont in the WAFL Women's. McDonald played for Western Australia at the 2019 AFL Women's Under 18 Championships over June and July, and was invited to the national draft combine in Melbourne, set to take place in October. However, she was signed by West Coast prior to the event.

== AFLW career ==
West Coast confirmed McDonald's selection with pick 39 in the 2019 AFL Women's draft. Adam Selwood, the club's head of women's football, cited her competitiveness, her athleticism, and her ability to play at either end of the ground. She debuted in the opening round of the 2020 season, as part of the club's inaugural side.
