= 2017 Under 18 Women's Australian Championships =

Tournament details
- Host country: Australia
- City: Hobart
- Teams: 10
- Venue(s): Tasmanian Hockey Centre

Final positions
- Champions: (Queensland) QLD 1
- Runner-up: (New South Wales) NSW State
- Third place: (Western Australia) WA

Tournament statistics
- Matches played: 40
- Goals scored: 158 (3.95 per match)
- Top scorer(s): (Queensland) Ruby Harris (7 goals)

The 2017 Women's Under 18 Australian Championships was a field hockey tournament held in the Tasmanian city of Hobart from 19–29 April 2017.

QLD 1 won the gold medal, defeating NSW State 2–0 in the final. WA won the bronze medal by defeating VIC 4–1 in the third place playoff.

== Teams ==
- (Australian Capital Territory) ACT
- (New South Wales) NSW Blue
- (New South Wales) NSW State
- (Northern Territory) NT
- (Queensland) QLD 1
- (Queensland) QLD 2
- (South Australia) SA
- (Tasmania) TAS
- (Victoria (state)) VIC
- (Western Australia) WA

== Results ==
=== Preliminary round ===
- Each team played one crossover match; points have been added to teams' respective pools.

==== Pool A ====
Pos	Team	Pld	W	D	L	GF	GA	GD	Pts	Qualification
1	(Queensland) QLD 1	5	5	0	0	22	7	+15	15	Medal Round
2	(Victoria (state)) VIC	5	2	2	1	13	12	+1	8	Medal Round
3	(Tasmania) TAS	5	2	0	3	8	10	−2	6	
4	(Queensland) QLD 2	5	1	2	2	12	13	−1	5	
5	(South Australia) SA	5	1	1	3	6	12	−6	4	

Source: Hockey Australia
Rules for classification: 1) points; 2) matches won; 3) goal difference; 4) goals for; 5) head-to-head result; 6) field goals scored.

19 April 2017
13:00

QLD 1 (Queensland)	4–1	(New South Wales) NSW State
D. Dolkens 27'; Smith 34'; Harris 53'; C. Dolkens 66'	Report	Field 11'

Umpires:
Alissia Pearson (AUS)
Kelby Pointon (AUS)

19 April 2017
15:00

VIC (Victoria (state))	3–0	(Tasmania) TAS
Downes 18'; Moore 52', 57'	Report

Umpires:
Monique Yearbury (AUS)
Miranda McNamara (AUS)

19 April 2017
17:00

QLD 2 (Queensland)	6–1	(South Australia) SA
Staples 27', 33', 40', 55'; Chappell 35', 50'	Report	Higgins 54'

Umpires:
Alissia Pearson (AUS)
Kelby Pointon (AUS)

20 April 2017
13:00

QLD 2 (Queensland)	2–2	(New South Wales) NSW Blue
Adams 38', 54'	Report	Askey 11'; Pritchard 57'

Umpires:
Miranda McNamara (AUS)
Cassidy Gallagher (AUS)

20 April 2017
15:00

VIC (Victoria (state))	0–0	(South Australia) SA
	Report

Umpires:
Lauren Berndt (AUS)
Peta Wallison (AUS)

20 April 2017
17:00

QLD 1 (Queensland)	5–1	(Tasmania) TAS
Ferguson 7'; Harris 13', 40'; Brown 42'; D. Dolkens 63'	Report	Bridley 25'

Umpires:
Chloe Johnston (AUS)
Kate Cook (AUS)

21 April 2017
13:00

VIC (Victoria (state))	4–3	(Western Australia) WA
Downes 8', 70'; Guy 15'; Moore 54'	Report	Kaesler 9'; Hopkinson 14'; Sertorio 38'

Umpires:
Lauren Berndt (AUS)
Cassidy Gallagher (AUS)

21 April 2017
15:00

QLD 2 (Queensland)	1–5	(Queensland) QLD 1
Ait Oumeziane 54'	Report	McBurnie 9'; Harris 52', 67'; D. Dolkens 64'; Fitzpatrick 70'

Umpires:
Kate Cook (AUS)
Chloe Johnston (AUS)

21 April 2017
17:00

SA (South Australia)	2–1	(Tasmania) TAS
Cameron 61'; De Broughe 64'	Report	Bridley 23'

Umpires:
Peta Wallison (AUS)
Kelby Pointon (AUS)

23 April 2017
09:00

VIC (Victoria (state))	3–6	(Queensland) QLD 1
Geddis 46'; Downes 48'; Lynch 61'	Report	Conway 16'; Mathison 32', 41'; Harris 33', 53'; McBurnie 39'

Umpires:
Alissia Pearson (AUS)
Jessica Currie (AUS)

23 April 2017
11:00

TAS (Tasmania)	2–0	(Queensland) QLD 2
Goldsmith 10', 39'	Report

Umpires:
Lauren Berndt (AUS)
Monique Yearbury (AUS)

23 April 2017
13:00

SA (South Australia)	2–3	(Australian Capital Territory) ACT
Shand 23'; De Broughe 64'	Report	Della 35+', 47'; Woodbridge 49'

Umpires:
Kate Cook (AUS)
Cassidy Gallagher (AUS)

24 April 2017
09:00

QLD 1 (Queensland)	2–1	(South Australia) SA
Conway 39'; Mathison 59'	Report	De Broughe 66'

Umpires:
Lauren Berndt (AUS)
Kelby Pointon (AUS)

24 April 2017
11:00

QLD 2 (Queensland)	3–3	(Victoria (state)) VIC
Smith 6'; Staples 25'; Nicholls 46'	Report	Downes 62'; Utri 65'; Stirling 70'

Umpires:
Jessica Currie (AUS)
Chloe Johnston (AUS)

24 April 2017
13:00

TAS (Tasmania)	4–0	(Northern Territory) NT
French 13'; Bridley 34'; Gunn 55'; Spandler 68'	Report

Umpires:
Cassidy Gallagher (AUS)
Miranda McNamara (AUS)

==== Pool B ====
Pos	Team	Pld	W	D	L	GF	GA	GD	Pts	Qualification
1	(New South Wales) NSW State	5	3	1	1	25	5	+20	10	Medal Round
2	(Western Australia) WA	5	2	2	1	12	7	+5	8	Medal Round
3	(New South Wales) NSW Blue	5	1	3	1	7	12	−5	6	
4	(Australian Capital Territory) ACT	5	1	1	3	4	16	−12	4	
5	(Northern Territory) NT	5	1	0	4	4	19	−15	3	

Source: Hockey Australia
Rules for classification: 1) points; 2) matches won; 3) goal difference; 4) goals for; 5) head-to-head result; 6) field goals scored.

19 April 2017
09:00

WA (Western Australia)	2–1	(Northern Territory) NT
Somerville 2'; Rockliff 62'	Report	Lidbetter 35'

Umpires:
Peta Wallison (AUS)
Chloe Johnston (AUS)

19 April 2017
11:00

NSW Blue (New South Wales)	0–0	(Australian Capital Territory) ACT
	Report

Umpires:
Lauren Berndt (AUS)
Jessica Currie (AUS)

19 April 2017
13:00

QLD 1 (Queensland)	4–1	(New South Wales) NSW State
D. Dolkens 27'; Smith 34'; Harris 53'; C. Dolkens 66'	Report	Field 11'

Umpires:
Alissia Pearson (AUS)
Kelby Pointon (AUS)

20 April 2017
09:00

WA (Western Australia)	5–0	(Australian Capital Territory) ACT
Somerville 20', 50'; Hopkinson 25'; Kaesler 39'; Byrnes 52'	Report

Umpires:
Monique Yearbury (AUS)
Alissia Pearson (AUS)

20 April 2017
11:00

NSW State (New South Wales)	8–0	(Northern Territory) NT
Steel 26'; Schonell 35', 46', 46', 64'; Smith 59', 66'; Constance 61'	Report

Umpires:
Kelby Pointon (AUS)
Jessica Currie (AUS)

20 April 2017
13:00

QLD 2 (Queensland)	2–2	(New South Wales) NSW Blue
Adams 38', 54'	Report	Askey 11'; Pritchard 57'

Umpires:
Miranda McNamara (AUS)
Cassidy Gallagher (AUS)

21 April 2017
09:00

NSW Blue (New South Wales)	0–8	(New South Wales) NSW State
	Report	Hemmingway 9'; Smith 15'; Doolan 28', 70'; Field 42'; Schonell 63'; Radcliffe 65'; Bradley 66'

Umpires:
Monique Yearbury (AUS)
Jessica Currie (AUS)

21 April 2017
11:00

ACT (Australian Capital Territory)	1–2	(Northern Territory) NT
Ronnfeldt 20'	Report	Lidbetter 55', 60'

Umpires:
Miranda McNamara (AUS)
Alissia Pearson (AUS)

21 April 2017
13:00

VIC (Victoria (state))	4–3	(Western Australia) WA
Downes 8', 70'; Guy 15'; Moore 54'	Report	Kaesler 9'; Hopkinson 14'; Sertorio 38'

Umpires:
Lauren Berndt (AUS)
Cassidy Gallagher (AUS)

23 April 2017
13:00

SA (South Australia)	2–3	(Australian Capital Territory) ACT
Shand 23'; De Broughe 64'	Report	Della 35+', 47'; Woodbridge 49'

Umpires:
Kate Cook (AUS)
Cassidy Gallagher (AUS)

23 April 2017
15:00

WA (Western Australia)	1–1	(New South Wales) NSW State
Kaesler 41'	Report	Radcliffe 52'

Umpires:
Peta Wallison (AUS)
Monique Yearbury (AUS)

23 April 2017
17:00

NT (Northern Territory)	1–4	(New South Wales) NSW Blue
Lidbetter 68'	Report	Kable 13', 65'; Lee 47', 51'

Umpires:
Kelby Pointon (AUS)
Chloe Johnston (AUS)

24 April 2017
13:00

TAS (Tasmania)	4–0	(Northern Territory) NT
French 13'; Bridley 34'; Gunn 55'; Spandler 68'	Report

Umpires:
Cassidy Gallagher (AUS)
Miranda McNamara (AUS)

24 April 2017
15:00

NSW State (New South Wales)	7–0	(Australian Capital Territory) ACT
Toohey 38'; Chaffey 41'; Johnston 46'; Bradley 48'; Schonell 54'; Doolan 61'; Radcliffe 65'	Report

Umpires:
Kate Cook (AUS)
Peta Wallison (AUS)

24 April 2017
17:00

NSW Blue (New South Wales)	1–1	(Western Australia) WA
Pritchard 35'	Report	Hopkinson 2'

Umpires:
Alissia Pearson (AUS)
Monique Yearbury (AUS)

=== Classification round ===
==== Fifth to eighth place classification ====
===== Pool D =====
Pos	Team	Pld	W	D	L	GF	GA	GD	Pts
1	(Tasmania) TAS	5	3	1	1	9	2	+7	10
2	(New South Wales) NSW Blue	5	2	3	0	8	3	+5	9
3	(Queensland) QLD 2	5	2	2	1	11	5	+6	8
4	(South Australia) SA	5	2	1	2	8	13	−5	7
5	(Northern Territory) NT	5	1	0	4	4	13	−9	3
6	(Australian Capital Territory) ACT	5	0	3	2	4	8	−4	3

Source: Hockey Australia
Rules for classification: 1) points; 2) matches won; 3) goal difference; 4) goals for; 5) head-to-head result; 6) field goals scored.

26 April 2017
09:00

SA (South Australia)	2–2	(Australian Capital Territory) ACT
McMahon 39'; De Broughe 70'	Report	Woodbridge 25', 29'

Umpires:
Chloe Johnston (AUS)
Jessica Currie (AUS)

26 April 2017
11:00

TAS (Tasmania)	3–0	(Northern Territory) NT
Vickery 41'; Kenworthy 43'; Grant 52'	Report

Umpires:
Kelby Pointon (AUS)
Lauren Berndt (AUS)

26 April 2017
13:00

QLD 2 (Queensland)	1–1	(New South Wales) NSW Blue
Fitzpatrick 22'	Report	Callander 54'

Umpires:
Peta Wallison (AUS)
Kate Cook (AUS)

27 April 2017
09:00

QLD 2 (Queensland)	3–0	(Northern Territory) NT
Staples 5'; Smith 28'; Ait Oumezaine 68'	Report

Umpires:
Chloe Johnston (AUS)
Miranda McNamara (AUS)

27 April 2017
11:00

SA (South Australia)	1–3	(New South Wales) NSW Blue
Shand 68'	Report	McGrath 18'; Lee 36'; Askey 50'

Umpires:
Kelby Pointon (AUS)
Alissia Pearson (AUS)

27 April 2017
13:00

TAS (Tasmania)	3–0	(Australian Capital Territory) ACT
Bridley 26', 69'; Scutt 51'	Report

Umpires:
Peta Wallison (AUS)
Cassidy Gallagher (AUS)

29 April 2017
08:00

SA (South Australia)	2–1	(Northern Territory) NT
Higgins 14'; Hoffman 53'	Report	Roy 13'

Umpires:
Alissia Pearson (AUS)
Jessica Currie (AUS)

29 April 2017
09:00

TAS (Tasmania)	0–0	(New South Wales) NSW Blue
	Report

Umpires:
Peta Wallison (AUS)
Chloe Johnston (AUS)

29 April 2017
12:00

QLD 2 (Queensland)	1–1	(Australian Capital Territory) ACT
Robson 67'	Report	Connell 59'

Umpires:
Kelby Pointon (AUS)
Cassidy Gallagher (AUS)

==== First to fourth place classification ====
===== Pool C =====
Pos	Team	Pld	W	D	L	GF	GA	GD	Pts
1	(Queensland) QLD 1	3	3	0	0	8	3	+5	9
2	(New South Wales) NSW State	3	1	1	1	7	2	+5	4
3	(Western Australia) WA	3	1	1	1	6	3	+3	4
4	(Victoria (state)) VIC	3	0	0	3	4	17	−13	0

Source: Hockey Australia
Rules for classification: 1) points; 2) matches won; 3) goal difference; 4) goals for; 5) head-to-head result; 6) field goals scored.

26 April 2017
15:00

QLD 1 (Queensland)	1–0	(Western Australia) WA
Mathison 69'	Report

Umpires:
Monique Yearbury (AUS)
Cassidy Gallagher (AUS)

26 April 2017
17:00

VIC (Victoria (state))	0–6	(New South Wales) NSW State
	Report	Chaffey 15'; Toohey 21'; Steel 21'; Hemmingway 46'; Radcliffe 51'; Smith 60'

Umpires:
Miranda McNamara (AUS)
Alissia Pearson (AUS)

27 April 2017
15:00

VIC (Victoria (state))	1–5	(Western Australia) WA
Lynch 12'	Report	Byrnes 14'; Kaesler 26', 37'; Hopkinson 48'; Somerville 63'

Umpires:
Monique Yearbury (AUS)
Lauren Berndt (AUS)

27 April 2017
17:00

QLD 1 (Queensland)	1–0	(New South Wales) NSW State
C. Dolkens 61'	Report

Umpires:
Kate Cook (AUS)
Jessica Currie (AUS)

===== Third and fourth place =====
29 April 2017
11:00

WA (Western Australia)	4–1	(Victoria (state)) VIC
Hutton 3'; Kaesler 30'; Byrnes 40'; Sertorio 70'	Report	Malligan 14'

Umpires:
Lauren Berndt (AUS)
Miranda McNamara (AUS)

===== Final =====
29 April 2017
15:30

QLD 1 (Queensland)	2–0	(New South Wales) NSW State
Conway 34'; C. Dolkens 49'	Report

Umpires:
Monique Yearbury (AUS)
Kate Cook (AUS)

== Statistics ==
=== Final standings ===
Pos	Team	Pld	W	D	L	GF	GA	GD	Pts	Final Result
1st place, gold medalist(s)	(Queensland) QLD 1	8	8	0	0	26	7	+19	24	Gold Medal
2nd place, silver medalist(s)	(New South Wales) NSW State	8	4	1	3	31	8	+23	13	Silver Medal
3rd place, bronze medalist(s)	(Western Australia) WA	8	4	2	2	21	10	+11	14	Bronze Medal
4	(Victoria (state)) VIC	8	2	2	4	15	27	−12	8	
5	(Tasmania) TAS	8	4	1	3	14	10	+4	13	
6	(New South Wales) NSW Blue	8	2	5	1	11	14	−3	11	
7	(Queensland) QLD 2	8	2	4	2	17	15	+2	10	
8	(South Australia) SA	8	2	2	4	11	18	−7	8	
9	(Northern Territory) NT	8	1	0	7	5	27	−22	3	
10	(Australian Capital Territory) ACT	8	1	3	4	7	22	−15	6	

Source: Hockey Australia
