= Dolkens =

Dolkens is a surname. Notable people with the surname include:

- Casey Dolkens, Australian field hockey player
- Dayle Dolkens, Australian field hockey player
