= 2016 Under 18 Men's Australian Championships =

Tournament details
- Host country: Australia
- City: Launceston
- Teams: 11
- Venue(s): Launceston Hockey Centre

Final positions
- Champions: (Western Australia) WA
- Runner-up: (New South Wales) NSW State
- Third place: (Victoria (state)) VIC Blue

Tournament statistics
- Matches played: 36
- Goals scored: 209 (5.81 per match)
- Top scorer(s): (Victoria (state)) Nathan Ephraums (14 goals)

The 2016 Men's Under 18 Australian Championships was a field hockey tournament held in the Tasmanian city of Launceston from 8–17 July.

WA won the gold medal, defeating NSW State 2–1 in penalties after the final finished a 3–3 draw. VIC Blue won the bronze medal by defeating TAS 3–2 in the third place playoff.

== Teams ==
- (Australian Capital Territory) ACT
- (New South Wales) NSW Blue
- (New South Wales) NSW State
- (Northern Territory) NT
- (Queensland) QLD 1
- (Queensland) QLD 2
- (South Australia) SA
- (Tasmania) TAS
- (Victoria (state)) VIC Blue
- (Victoria (state)) VIC White
- (Western Australia) WA

== Results ==
=== Preliminary round ===
==== Pool A ====
Pos	Team	Pld	W	D	L	GF	GA	GD	Pts	Qualification
1	(New South Wales) NSW State	4	2	2	0	19	6	+13	8	Advance to Semi-finals
2	(Western Australia) WA	4	2	2	0	11	3	+8	8	Advance to Semi-finals
3	(South Australia) SA	4	1	2	1	10	9	+1	5	
4	(Queensland) QLD 1	4	1	2	1	8	12	−4	5	
5	(Victoria (state)) VIC White	4	0	0	4	4	22	−18	0	

Source: Hockey Australia
Rules for classification: 1) points; 2) matches won; 3) goal difference; 4) goals for; 5) head-to-head result; 6) field goals scored.

8 July 2016
09:30

WA (Western Australia)	2–2	(New South Wales) NSW State
Taylor 11'; Puzey 35'	Report	Hazell 4'; Gallagher 17'

Umpires:
Harley Schenk (AUS)
Jayden Pearson (AUS)

8 July 2016
11:30

SA (South Australia)	4–4	(Queensland) QLD 1
Ferme 28'; Fry 41', 51'; Busiko 69'	Report	Fitzpatrick 9', 32'; Farrell 61'; Perkins 66'

Umpires:
Aidan Elliot (AUS)
Todd Gilroy (AUS)

9 July 2016
09:00

SA (South Australia)	0–2	(Western Australia) WA
	Report	Ryan 5'; Green 70+'

Umpires:
Harley Schenk (AUS)
Zac Tinning (AUS)

9 July 2016
11:00

VIC White (Victoria (state))	2–9	(New South Wales) NSW State
Schreck 12'; Barnett 67'	Report	Stahl 6'; Hazell 11', 27'; Halyard 17', 42', 61'; Graf 25'; Carr 65', 70'

Umpires:
Aidan Elliot (AUS)
Sam Hamilton (AUS)

10 July 2016
09:30

QLD 1 (Queensland)	0–6	(New South Wales) NSW State
	Report	Halyard 24'; Hazell 33', 63'; Brown 35+'; Nyrhinen 43'; Gallagher 67'

Umpires:
Jayden Pearson (AUS)
Jordan Moore (AUS)

10 July 2016
11:30

WA (Western Australia)	6–0	(Victoria (state)) VIC White
Golding 26', 30', 48'; Pattern-Williams 55'; Green 60'; Taylor 65'	Report

Umpires:
Christopher Harris (AUS)
Todd Gilroy (AUS)

13 July 2016
15:30

WA (Western Australia)	1–1	(Queensland) QLD 1
Taylor 31'	Report	Farrell 70'

Umpires:
Jake Sheppeard (AUS)
Timothy Sheahan (AUS)

13 July 2016
17:30

SA (South Australia)	4–1	(Victoria (state)) VIC White
Busiko 3', 10', 44'; Higgins 60'	Report	Kerr-Nelson 42'

Umpires:
Jayden Pearson (AUS)
Nathan Chambers (AUS)

14 July 2016
13:00

NSW State (New South Wales)	2–2	(South Australia) SA
Hazell 21'; Turner 56'	Report	Busiko 6', 31'

Umpires:
Jayden Pearson (AUS)
Sam Hamilton (AUS)

14 July 2016
15:00

QLD 1 (Queensland)	3–1	(Victoria (state)) VIC White
Ferns 17'; Fitzpatrick 58'; McCoombes 70'	Report	Snowden 69'

Umpires:
Nathan Chambers (AUS)
Todd Gilroy (AUS)

==== Pool B ====
Pos	Team	Pld	W	D	L	GF	GA	GD	Pts	Qualification
1	(Victoria (state)) VIC Blue	5	5	0	0	27	10	+17	15	Advance to Semi-finals
2	(Tasmania) TAS	5	4	0	1	18	9	+9	12	Advance to Semi-finals
3	(New South Wales) NSW Blue	5	2	0	3	17	14	+3	6	
4	(Queensland) QLD 2	5	1	1	3	11	16	−5	4	
5	(Australian Capital Territory) ACT	5	1	1	3	12	26	−14	4	
6	(Northern Territory) NT	5	1	0	4	10	20	−10	3	

Source: Hockey Australia
Rules for classification: 1) points; 2) matches won; 3) goal difference; 4) goals for; 5) head-to-head result; 6) field goals scored.

8 July 2016
13:30

NT (Northern Territory)	0–2	(Queensland) QLD 2
	Report	Karri 19', 24'

Umpires:
Timothy Sheahan (AUS)
Nathan Chambers (AUS)

8 July 2016
15:30

TAS (Tasmania)	5–1	(Australian Capital Territory) ACT
Bailey 21'; Redman 22'; Smith 24'; Burgess 25'; McCulloch 41'	Report	Knight 49'

Umpires:
Jake Sheppeard (AUS)
Sam Hamilton (AUS)

8 July 2016
17:30

NSW Blue (New South Wales)	1–4	(Victoria (state)) VIC Blue
Lewin 38'	Report	Ephraums 2', 45'; Rennie 21'; Johnson 70'

Umpires:
Christopher Harris (AUS)
Jordan Moore (AUS)

9 July 2016
13:00

NSW Blue (New South Wales)	1–3	(Tasmania) TAS
Hudson 23'	Report	McCulloch 44'; McCarthy 44'; Bailey 52'

Umpires:
Christopher Harris (AUS)
Timothy Sheahan (AUS)

9 July 2016
15:00

NT (Northern Territory)	7–2	(Australian Capital Territory) ACT
Havercroft 5'; Farmer 9'; Southwood 40'; Vaitekenas 42', 44', 45'; Hochman 50'	Report	Knight 54', 56'

Umpires:
Todd Gilroy (AUS)
Jordan Moore (AUS)

9 July 2016
17:00

QLD 2 (Queensland)	3–6	(Victoria (state)) VIC Blue
Hardy 13', 40', 70'	Report	Ephraums 8', 35'; Poppenbeek 9', 36'; Rennie 57'; Mulder 62'

Umpires:
Jake Sheppeard (AUS)
Nathan Chambers (AUS)

10 July 2016
13:30

QLD 2 (Queensland)	1–4	(New South Wales) NSW Blue
Sugio 9'	Report	Smith 13'; Galvin 14'; Carr 29'; Roberts 45'

Umpires:
Timothy Sheahan (AUS)
Aidan Elliot (AUS)

10 July 2016
15:30

VIC Blue (Victoria (state))	8–2	(Australian Capital Territory) ACT
Johnson 19'; Ephraums 29', 41', 54', 67'; Rennie 49'; Dalton 50'; Pane 52'	Report	Gupte 14'; Knight 41'

Umpires:
Sam Hamilton (AUS)
Zac Tinning (AUS)

10 July 2016
17:30

TAS (Tasmania)	4–0	(Northern Territory) NT
Gill 13'; McCarthy 33', 46'; McCulloch 70+'	Report

Umpires:
Harley Schenk (AUS)
Jake Sheppeard (AUS)

12 July 2016
09:00

ACT (Australian Capital Territory)	4–3	(New South Wales) NSW Blue
Knight 3', 31'; McLennan 39'; Gupte 69'	Report	Roberts 15'; Dolby 23'; Smith 49'

Umpires:
Jordan Moore (AUS)
Timothy Sheahan (AUS)

13 July 2016
09:30

TAS (Tasmania)	3–5	(Victoria (state)) VIC Blue
McCulloch 23'; Gill 35'; McCarthy 52'	Report	McBride 8'; Poppenbeek 20'; Ephraums 32', 54'; Rennie 34'

Umpires:
Todd Gilroy (AUS)
Harley Schenk (AUS)

13 July 2016
11:30

ACT (Australian Capital Territory)	3–3	(Queensland) QLD 2
Gupte 51'; Hides 66', 69'	Report	Karri 14', 48'; Weyer 70'

Umpires:
Jordan Moore (AUS)
Zac Tinning (AUS)

13 July 2016
13:30

NSW Blue (New South Wales)	8–2	(Northern Territory) NT
Dolby 16', 31', 35+'; Galvin 19'; Carr 46'; Roberts 54', 70'; O'Daly 62'	Report	Havercroft 25', 33'

Umpires:
Aidan Elliot (AUS)
Sam Hamilton (AUS)

14 July 2016
09:00

QLD 2 (Queensland)	2–3	(Tasmania) TAS
Karri 68', 69'	Report	McCarthy 4'; Burgess 16'; McCulloch 29'

Umpires:
Jake Sheppeard (AUS)
Zac Tinning (AUS)

14 July 2016
11:00

VIC Blue (Victoria (state))	4–1	(Northern Territory) NT
Ephruams 4', 68'; Henderson 29'; Dalton 59'	Report	Southwood 39'

Umpires:
Harley Schenk (AUS)
Christopher Harris (AUS)

=== Classification round ===
==== Ninth to eleventh place classification ====
===== Pool C =====
Pos	Team	Pld	W	D	L	GF	GA	GD	Pts
1	(Australian Capital Territory) ACT	2	2	0	0	13	4	+9	6
2	(Northern Territory) NT	2	1	0	1	9	10	−1	3
3	(Victoria (state)) VIC White	2	0	0	2	6	14	−8	0

Source: Hockey Australia
Rules for classification: 1) points; 2) matches won; 3) goal difference; 4) goals for; 5) head-to-head result; 6) field goals scored.

15 July 2016
12:00

ACT (Australian Capital Territory)	6–2	(Northern Territory) NT
Knight 7', 12', 33', 46'; Norberg 25'; Daley 39'	Report	Pace 37'; McEvoy 65'

Umpires:
Aidan Elliot (AUS)
Todd Gilroy (AUS)

16 July 2016
09:00

VIC White (Victoria (state))	4–7	(Northern Territory) NT
Kerr-Nelson 9', 20'; Barnett 22', 40'	Report	Havercroft 27'; Vaitekenas 35+', 47', 67', 67'; Kilburn 65'; Hochman 70'

Umpires:
Zac Tinning (AUS)
Christopher Harris (AUS)

17 July 2016
09:00

VIC White (Victoria (state))	2–7	(Australian Capital Territory) ACT
Fernandes 23'; Barnett 58'	Report	Knight 8', 16', 47'; Hides 36', 50'; Gupte 40'; Orr 68'

Umpires:
Nathan Chambers (AUS)
Zac Tinning (AUS)

==== Fifth to eighth place classification ====
Crossover
16 July 2016
(South Australia) SA	3
(Queensland) QLD 2	0
16 July 2016
(New South Wales) NSW Blue	1
(Queensland) QLD 1	1

Fifth place
17 July 2016
(South Australia) SA	0
(New South Wales) NSW Blue	1
Seventh place
17 July 2016
(Queensland) QLD 2	2
(Queensland) QLD 1	3

===== Crossover =====
16 July 2016
11:00

SA (South Australia)	3–0	(Queensland) QLD 2
Blight 10'; Busiko 22', 39'	Report

Umpires:
Jake Sheppeard (AUS)
Nathan Chambers (AUS)

16 July 2016
15:00

NSW Blue (New South Wales)	1–1	(Queensland) QLD 1
Hudson 8'	Report	Yates 22'

Umpires:
Timothy Sheahan (AUS)
Jordan Moore (AUS)

===== Seventh and eighth place =====
17 July 2016
15:00

QLD 2 (Queensland)	2–3	(Queensland) QLD 1
Wilson 47'; Fossey 53'	Report	Ford 7'; Chappell 24'; Wilcox 64'

Umpires:
Jordan Moore (AUS)
Todd Gilroy (AUS)

===== Fifth and sixth place =====
17 July 2016
17:00

SA (South Australia)	0–1	(New South Wales) NSW Blue
	Report	Carr 45'

Umpires:
Sam Hamilton (AUS)
Christopher Harris (AUS)

==== First to fourth place classification ====
Semi-Finals
16 July 2016
(New South Wales) NSW State	7
(Tasmania) TAS	0
16 July 2016
(Victoria (state)) VIC Blue	2
(Western Australia) WA	3

Final
17 July 2016
(New South Wales) NSW State	3 (1)
(Western Australia) WA (pen.)	3 (2)
Third place
17 July 2016
(Tasmania) TAS	2
(Victoria (state)) VIC Blue	3

===== Semi-finals =====
16 July 2016
15:00

NSW State (New South Wales)	7–0	(Tasmania) TAS
Turner 5', 63'; Carr 13'; Hazell 26', 28'; Wigham 62'; Nyrhinen 70'	Report

Umpires:
Harley Schenk (AUS)
Aidan Elliot (AUS)

16 July 2016
17:00

VIC Blue (Victoria (state))	2–3	(Western Australia) WA
Ephraums 36', 55'	Report	Andrew 8'; Green 18'; Collins 52'

Umpires:
Jayden Pearson (AUS)
Todd Gilroy (AUS)

===== Third and fourth place =====
17 July 2016
11:30

TAS (Tasmania)	2–3	(Victoria (state)) VIC Blue
McCulloch 25'; McCarthy 51'	Report	Poppenbeek 35+', 43', 69'

Umpires:
Aidan Elliot (AUS)
Jake Sheppeard (AUS)

===== Final =====
16 July 2016
18:15

NSW State (New South Wales)	3–3	(Western Australia) WA
Nyrhinen 9'; Wigham 47'; Carr 50'	Report	Green 23'; Ryan 29'; Leaversuch 51'
Penalties
Carr (penalty shoot-out missed); Graf (penalty shoot-out missed); Halyard (penalty shoot-out missed); Nyrhinen (penalty shoot-out scored); Mackay (penalty shoot-out missed)	1–2	(penalty shoot-out scored) Pattern-Williams; (penalty shoot-out scored) Green; (penalty shoot-out missed) Fraser; (penalty shoot-out missed) Andrew; (penalty shoot-out missed) Murray

Umpires:
Jayden Pearson (AUS)
Timothy Sheahan (AUS)

== Statistics ==
=== Final standings ===
Pos	Team	Pld	W	D	L	GF	GA	GD	Pts	Final Result
1st place, gold medalist(s)	(Western Australia) WA	6	3	3	0	17	8	+9	12	Gold Medal
2nd place, silver medalist(s)	(New South Wales) NSW State	6	3	3	0	29	9	+20	12	Silver Medal
3rd place, bronze medalist(s)	(Victoria (state)) VIC Blue	7	6	0	1	32	15	+17	18	Bronze Medal
4	(Tasmania) TAS	7	4	0	3	20	19	+1	12	
5	(New South Wales) NSW Blue	7	3	1	3	19	15	+4	10	
6	(South Australia) SA	6	2	2	2	13	10	+3	8	
7	(Queensland) QLD 1	6	2	3	1	12	15	−3	9	
8	(Queensland) QLD 2	7	1	1	5	13	22	−9	4	
9	(Australian Capital Territory) ACT	7	3	1	3	25	30	−5	10	
10	(Northern Territory) NT	7	2	0	5	19	30	−11	6	
11	(Victoria (state)) VIC White	6	0	0	6	10	36	−26	0	

Source: Hockey Australia
