= 2015 Under 18 Men's Australian Championships =

Tournament details
- Host country: Australia
- City: Melbourne
- Teams: 10
- Venue(s): State Netball and Hockey Centre

Final positions
- Champions: (Western Australia) WA
- Runner-up: (Tasmania) TAS
- Third place: (Victoria (state)) VIC Blue

Tournament statistics
- Matches played: 35
- Goals scored: 161 (4.6 per match)
- Top scorer(s): (New South Wales) Isaac Farmilo (New South Wales) Kurt Lovett (Western Australia) Coby Green (9 goals)

The 2015 Men's Under 18 Australian Championships was a field hockey tournament held in the Victorian city of Melbourne from 8–16 April.

WA won the gold medal, defeating TAS 3–2 in the final. VIC Blue won the bronze medal by defeating QLD 6–3 in the third place playoff.

== Teams ==
- (Australian Capital Territory) ACT
- (New South Wales) NSW Blue
- (New South Wales) NSW State
- (Northern Territory) NT
- (Queensland) QLD
- (South Australia) SA
- (Tasmania) TAS
- (Victoria (state)) VIC Blue
- (Victoria (state)) VIC White
- (Western Australia) WA

== Results ==
=== Preliminary round ===
- Each team played one crossover match; points have been added to teams' respective pools.

==== Pool A ====
Pos	Team	Pld	W	D	L	GF	GA	GD	Pts	Qualification
1	(Victoria (state)) VIC Blue	5	4	0	1	24	7	+17	12	Advance to Semi-finals
2	(Queensland) QLD	5	2	2	1	21	12	+9	8	Advance to Semi-finals
3	(New South Wales) NSW Blue	5	2	1	2	26	17	+9	7	
4	(South Australia) SA	5	1	0	4	11	26	−15	3	
5	(Northern Territory) NT	5	0	0	5	10	38	−28	0	

Source: Hockey Australia
Rules for classification: 1) points; 2) matches won; 3) goal difference; 4) goals for; 5) head-to-head result; 6) field goals scored.

8 April 2015
11:00

QLD (Queensland)	7–2	(South Australia) SA
Guse 1'; Bonner 6'; Springfield 23', 53', 62'; Barnes 34'; Dale 40'	Report	Busiko 35+'; Abbott 51'

Umpires:
Jayden Pearson (AUS)
Aidan Elliot (AUS)

8 April 2015
13:00

VIC Blue (Victoria (state))	2–1	(New South Wales) NSW Blue
Steffens 55'; McBride 63'	Report	Hazell 11'

Umpires:
Todd Gilroy (AUS)
Jai Brown (AUS)

8 April 2015
15:00

NT (Northern Territory)	3–6	(Victoria (state)) VIC White
Hochman 19'; Kilburn 37'; Vanderkley 63'	Report	Currie 22', 45', 57'; Scott 35'; Lyon 65', 70'

Umpires:
Jake Sheppeard (AUS)
Zac Tinning (AUS)

9 April 2015
11:30

QLD (Queensland)	2–3	(Victoria (state)) VIC Blue
Wotherspoon 47'; Guse 54'	Report	Ephraums 6', 40'; Poppenbeek 63'

Umpires:
Todd Gilroy (AUS)
Jake Sheppeard (AUS)

9 April 2015
13:30

NT (Northern Territory)	4–10	(New South Wales) NSW Blue
Southwood 35+'; Andrade 49'; Hochman 52'; Kilburn 70+'	Report	Donovan 2', 8', 31'; Turner 12', 25'; J. Staines 15'; Charters 16'; Mackay 23'; B. Staines 58'; Wigham 68'

Umpires:
Harley Schenk (AUS)
Lachlan Purser (AUS)

9 April 2015
15:00

ACT (Australian Capital Territory)	3–1	(South Australia) SA
McLennan 8'; N. Gupte 17'; Knight 57'	Report	Schulz 47'

Umpires:
Christopher Harris (AUS)
Timothy Sheahan (AUS)

10 April 2015
11:30

SA (South Australia)	4–2	(Northern Territory) NT
Wells 11', 23', 28'; Higgins 70'	Report	Hochman 51', 69'

Umpires:
Todd Gilroy (AUS)
Timothy Sheahan (AUS)

10 April 2015
13:30

NSW Blue (New South Wales)	4–4	(Queensland) QLD
Hazell 4', 45'; Brown 35+'; Donovan 41'	Report	Gildea 2'; Wotherspoon 7', 27', 52'

Umpires:
Aidan Elliot (AUS)
Jai Brown (AUS)

10 April 2015
15:00

VIC Blue (Victoria (state))	0–2	(Western Australia) WA
	Report	Flynn 56'; Tate 69'

Umpires:
Jake Sheppeard (AUS)
Jayden Pearson (AUS)

12 April 2015
11:00

NT (Northern Territory)	1–6	(Queensland) QLD
Spatharis 10'	Report	Springfield 35+'; Barnes 51', 60'; Francis 55'; Baldwin 58'; Bonner 70+'

Umpires:
Timothy Sheahan (AUS)
Jake Sheppeard (AUS)

12 April 2015
13:00

VIC Blue (Victoria (state))	7–2	(South Australia) SA
Parry 1'; Hassall 8', 57'; McBride 21'; Hendry 49'; Coates 50'; Steffens 66'	Report	Whittaker 20'; Schulz 26'

Umpires:
Zac Tinning (AUS)
Todd Gilroy (AUS)

12 April 2015
15:00

NSW Blue (New South Wales)	4–5	(Tasmania) TAS
Wigham 34'; Donovan 42'; Brown 50'; J. Staines 59'	Report	Beattie 8'; Jones 25'; Burgess 48'; Buchanan 63', 70+'

Umpires:
Aidan Elliot (AUS)
Harley Schenk (AUS)

13 April 2015
11:00

NSW Blue (New South Wales)	7–2	(South Australia) SA
Brown 7'; B. Staines 25', 31'; Turner 17'; Galea 22'; J. Staines 50'; Wigham 60'	Report	Kitto 38'; Richmond-Spouse 53'

Umpires:
Jai Brown (AUS)
Lachlan Purser (AUS)

13 April 2015
13:00

VIC Blue (Victoria (state))	12–0	(Northern Territory) NT
Steffens 3'; Coates 9', 26'; Bretherton 10', 32', 52'; Ephraums 17', 38'; Parry 30', 36'; Rennie 62'; Henderson 64'	Report

Umpires:
Christopher Harris (AUS)
Todd Gilroy (AUS)

13 April 2015
15:00

QLD (Queensland)	2–2	(New South Wales) NSW State
Wotherspoon 18'; Springfield 63'	Report	Farmilo 60'; Brand 68'

Umpires:
Jayden Pearson (AUS)
Timothy Sheahan (AUS)

==== Pool B ====
Pos	Team	Pld	W	D	L	GF	GA	GD	Pts	Qualification
1	(Western Australia) WA	5	4	1	0	18	5	+13	13	Advance to Semi-finals
2	(Tasmania) TAS	5	4	0	1	21	16	+5	12	Advance to Semi-finals
3	(New South Wales) NSW State	5	2	2	1	28	9	+19	8	
4	(Australian Capital Territory) ACT	5	2	0	3	11	25	−14	6	
5	(Victoria (state)) VIC White	5	1	0	4	13	28	−15	3	

Source: Hockey Australia
Rules for classification: 1) points; 2) matches won; 3) goal difference; 4) goals for; 5) head-to-head result; 6) field goals scored.

8 April 2015
11:30

NSW State (New South Wales)	13–2	(Australian Capital Territory) ACT
Farmilo 2', 37', 51', 52'; Mayo 4'; Lovett 14', 15', 19', 27', 55'; Richards 32'; Sharp 34', 53'	Report	McLennan 10'; N. Gupte 49'

Umpires:
Harley Schenk (AUS)
Christopher Harris (AUS)

8 April 2015
13:30

WA (Western Australia)	2–1	(Tasmania) TAS
Green 11', 51'	Report	Welch 16'

Umpires:
Timothy Sheahan (AUS)
Lachlan Purser (AUS)

8 April 2015
13:00

NT (Northern Territory)	3–6	(Victoria (state)) VIC White
Hochman 19'; Kilburn 37'; Vanderkley 63'	Report	Currie 22', 45', 57'; Scott 35'; Lyon 65', 70'

Umpires:
Jake Sheppeard (AUS)
Zac Tinning (AUS)

9 April 2015
11:00

NSW State (New South Wales)	2–2	(Western Australia) WA
Anderson 25'; Mayo 27'	Report	Thomas 59'; Green 61'

Umpires:
Jayden Pearson (AUS)
Jai Brown (AUS)

9 April 2015
13:00

VIC White (Victoria (state))	5–7	(Tasmania) TAS
Currie 28', 35', 57', 64', 69'	Report	Buchanan 23'; Austin 30'; Smith 49', 59'; Jones 51'; Beltz 58'; Welch 62'

Umpires:
Aidan Elliot (AUS)
Zac Tinning (AUS)

9 April 2015
15:00

ACT (Australian Capital Territory)	3–1	(South Australia) SA
McLennan 8'; N. Gupte 17'; Knight 57'	Report	Schulz 47'

Umpires:
Christopher Harris (AUS)
Timothy Sheahan (AUS)

10 April 2015
11:00

TAS (Tasmania)	3–2	(New South Wales) NSW State
Welch 16'; Wilkinson 50'; Austin 69'	Report	Mayo 49'; Richards 67'

Umpires:
Christopher Harris (AUS)
Lachlan Purser (AUS)

10 April 2015
13:00

ACT (Australian Capital Territory)	2–1	(Victoria (state)) VIC White
McDonald 5'; Morison 17'	Report	Nangle 11'

Umpires:
Harley Schenk (AUS)
Zac Tinning (AUS)

10 April 2015
15:00

VIC Blue (Victoria (state))	0–2	(Western Australia) WA
	Report	Flynn 56'; Tate 69'

Umpires:
Jake Sheppeard (AUS)
Jayden Pearson (AUS)

12 April 2015
11:30

VIC White (Victoria (state))	0–9	(New South Wales) NSW State
	Report	Anderson 36', 63'; Mayo 42'; Farmilo 51', 66'; Lovett 54', 64', 70'; Richards 60'

Umpires:
Christopher Harris (AUS)
Jayden Pearson (AUS)

12 April 2015
13:30

WA (Western Australia)	5–1	(Australian Capital Territory) ACT
Thomas 10'; Green 12'; Flynn 20', 50', 60'	Report	McLennan 56'

Umpires:
Jai Brown (AUS)
Lachlan Purser (AUS)

12 April 2015
15:00

NSW Blue (New South Wales)	4–5	(Tasmania) TAS
Wigham 34'; Donovan 42'; Brown 50'; J. Staines 59'	Report	Beattie 8'; Jones 25'; Burgess 48'; Buchanan 63', 70+'

Umpires:
Aidan Elliot (AUS)
Harley Schenk (AUS)

13 April 2015
11:30

WA (Western Australia)	7–1	(Victoria (state)) VIC White
Vaitekenas 4'; Flynn 5'; Green 9', 20', 31'; Fisher 51'; Andrew 67'	Report	Johnson 25'

Umpires:
Zac Tinning (AUS)
Jake Sheppeard (AUS)

13 April 2015
13:30

TAS (Tasmania)	5–3	(Australian Capital Territory) ACT
Hinton 13'; Beltz 16'; Buchanan 28'; Budgeon 54'; Smith 68'	Report	Deane 8', 24'; Stuckey 9'

Umpires:
Harley Schenk (AUS)
Aidan Elliot (AUS)

13 April 2015
15:00

QLD (Queensland)	2–2	(New South Wales) NSW State
Wotherspoon 18'; Springfield 63'	Report	Farmilo 60'; Brand 68'

Umpires:
Jayden Pearson (AUS)
Timothy Sheahan (AUS)

=== Classification round ===
==== Fifth to tenth place classification ====
- Results from each teams' crossover match were used in the final standings to provide a more accurate result.

Crossover Matches
NT (Northern Territory)	3–6	(Victoria (state)) VIC White	ACT (Australian Capital Territory)	3–1	(South Australia) SA
NSW Blue (New South Wales)	4–5	(Tasmania) TAS	QLD (Queensland)	2–2	(New South Wales) NSW State

===== Pool C =====
Pos	Team	Pld	W	D	L	GF	GA	GD	Pts
1	(New South Wales) NSW State	5	4	1	0	39	6	+33	13
2	(Australian Capital Territory) ACT	5	3	0	2	13	22	−9	9
3	(New South Wales) NSW Blue	5	2	1	2	27	18	+9	7
4	(South Australia) SA	5	2	0	3	11	19	−8	6
5	(Victoria (state)) VIC White	5	1	1	3	10	20	−10	4
6	(Northern Territory) NT	5	1	0	4	14	30	−16	3

Source: Hockey Australia
Rules for classification: 1) points; 2) matches won; 3) goal difference; 4) goals for; 5) head-to-head result; 6) field goals scored.

15 April 2015
09:00

NSW Blue (New South Wales)	3–4	(Australian Capital Territory) ACT
Galea 33'; Turner 39'; B. Staines 45'	Report	Stuckey 16'; McDonald 40'; McLennan 63'; Burnett 68'

Umpires:
Lachlan Purser (AUS)
Timothy Sheahan (AUS)

15 April 2015
09:30

NT (Northern Territory)	1–8	(New South Wales) NSW State
Andrade 54'	Report	Carr 2', 6', 17', 41'; Miotto 15', 55'; Brand 52', 65'

Umpires:
Jai Brown (AUS)
Zac Tinning (AUS)

15 April 2015
11:00

SA (South Australia)	3–0	(Victoria (state)) VIC White
Wells 36'; Larwood 39'; Anastasiou 51'	Report

Umpires:
Todd Gilroy (AUS)
Christopher Harris (AUS)

16 April 2015
09:00

NSW Blue (New South Wales)	3–3	(Victoria (state)) VIC White
Wigham 21'; B. Staines 29'; Donovan 57'	Report	Sinclair 13'; Nangle 63'; Cullen 67'

Umpires:
Jayden Pearson (AUS)
Christopher Harris (AUS)

16 April 2015
09:30

NT (Northern Territory)	4–2	(Australian Capital Territory) ACT
Wills 9'; Hochman 43', 64'; Ferns 51'	Report	Burnett 39'; Deane 53'

Umpires:
Zac Tinning (AUS)
Lachlan Purser (AUS)

16 April 2015
11:00

SA (South Australia)	1–7	(New South Wales) NSW State
Anastasiou 46'	Report	Richard 14', 63'; Lovett 31'; Farmilo 34', 70'; Anderson 57'; Carr 66'

Umpires:
Jai Brown (AUS)
Timothy Sheahan (AUS)

==== First to fourth place classification ====
Semi-Finals
15 April 2015
(Victoria (state)) VIC Blue	1
(Tasmania) TAS	2
15 April 2015
(Western Australia) WA	8
(Queensland) QLD	1

Final
16 April 2015
(Tasmania) TAS	2
(Western Australia) WA	3
Third place
16 April 2015
(Victoria (state)) VIC Blue	6
(Queensland) QLD	3

===== Semi-finals =====
15 April 2015
11:30

VIC Blue (Victoria (state))	1–2	(Tasmania) TAS
McBride 39'	Report	Budgeon 13'; Buchanan 68'

Umpires:
Harley Schenk (AUS)
Aidan Elliot (AUS)

15 April 2015
13:30

WA (Western Australia)	8–1	(Queensland) QLD
Taylor 3', 10'; Vaitekenas 12'; Harvie 18', 36'; Bowen 56'; Green 61'; Flynn 63'	Report	Bonner 67'

Umpires:
Jayden Pearson (AUS)
Jake Sheppeard (AUS)

===== Third and fourth place =====
15 April 2015
11:30

VIC Blue (Victoria (state))	6–3	(Queensland) QLD
Poppenbeek 10'; Parry 24', 33'; Coates 40'; Rennie 47'; McBride 66'	Report	Baldwin 41'; Dale 42'; Bonner 67'

Umpires:
Aidan Elliot (AUS)
Todd Gilroy (AUS)

===== Final =====
16 April 2015
14:00

TAS (Tasmania)	2–3	(Western Australia) WA
Welch 24'; Austin 43'	Report	Green 38'; Flynn 53', 66'

Umpires:
Harley Schenk (AUS)
Jake Sheppeard (AUS)

== Statistics ==
=== Final standings ===
Pos	Team	Pld	W	D	L	GF	GA	GD	Pts	Final Result
1st place, gold medalist(s)	(Western Australia) WA	7	6	1	0	29	8	+21	19	Gold Medal
2nd place, silver medalist(s)	(Tasmania) TAS	7	5	0	2	25	20	+5	15	Silver Medal
3rd place, bronze medalist(s)	(Victoria (state)) VIC Blue	7	5	0	2	31	12	+19	15	Bronze Medal
4	(Queensland) QLD	7	2	2	3	25	26	−1	8	
5	(New South Wales) NSW State	7	4	2	1	43	11	+32	14	
6	(Australian Capital Territory) ACT	7	3	0	4	17	32	−15	9	
7	(New South Wales) NSW Blue	7	2	2	3	32	24	+8	8	
8	(South Australia) SA	7	2	0	5	15	33	−18	6	
9	(Victoria (state)) VIC White	7	1	1	5	16	34	−18	4	
10	(Northern Territory) NT	7	1	0	6	15	48	−33	3	

Source: Hockey Australia
