= 2014 Under 18 Men's Australian Championships =

Under 18 Men's Australian Championships in field hockey in 2014

Tournament details
- Host country: Australia
- City: Canberra
- Teams: 10
- Venue: National Hockey Centre

Final positions
- Champions: (Queensland) QLD
- Runner-up: (New South Wales) NSW State
- Third place: (Western Australia) WA

Tournament statistics
- Matches played: 35
- Goals scored: 219 (6.26 per match)
- Top scorer(s): (Queensland) Tyler Gilmour (Western Australia) Alec Rasmussen (9 goals)
- Best player: (New South Wales) Nathanael Stewart

The 2014 Men's Under 18 Australian Championships was a field hockey tournament held in Australia's capital city, Canberra from 4–12 April.

QLD won the gold medal, defeating NSW State 8–2 in the final. WA won the bronze medal by defeating VIC Blue 5–1 in the third place playoff.

== Teams ==
- (Australian Capital Territory) ACT
- (New South Wales) NSW Blue
- (New South Wales) NSW State
- (Northern Territory) NT
- (Queensland) QLD
- (South Australia) SA
- (Tasmania) TAS
- (Victoria (state)) VIC Blue
- (Victoria (state)) VIC White
- (Western Australia) WA

== Results ==
=== Preliminary round ===
- Each team played one crossover match; points have been added to teams' respective pools.

==== Pool A ====
Pos	Team	Pld	W	D	L	GF	GA	GD	Pts	Qualification
1	(Western Australia) WA	5	4	1	0	26	4	+22	13	Advance to Semi-finals
2	(Victoria (state)) VIC Blue	5	4	1	0	24	8	+16	13	Advance to Semi-finals
3	(Victoria (state)) VIC White	5	2	0	3	10	29	−19	6	
4	(South Australia) SA	5	1	0	4	9	19	−10	3	
5	(Northern Territory) NT	5	0	0	5	6	30	−24	0	

Source: Hockey Australia
Rules for classification: 1) points; 2) matches won; 3) goal difference; 4) goals for; 5) head-to-head result; 6) field goals scored.

4 April 2014
15:00

NT (Northern Territory)	1–2	(Victoria (state)) VIC White
Edgar 29'	Report	Currie 13'; Cullen 63'

Stadium:
National Hockey Centre

4 April 2014
19:00

WA (Western Australia)	5–0	(South Australia) SA
Tate 4', 57'; Lloyd 27'; Rasmussen 64'; Bird 69'	Report

Stadium:
National Hockey Centre

4 April 2014
21:00

VIC Blue (Victoria (state))	6–2	(New South Wales) NSW Blue
Scanlon 21', 35+'; Hendry 40'; Allan 57'; Parry 58'; McBride 66'	Report	Sharp 4'; Donovan 69'

Stadium:
National Hockey Centre

5 April 2014
09:00

VIC Blue (Victoria (state))	5–2	(Victoria (state)) VIC White
Meaden 6'; Allan 9'; Scanlon 29'; Hendry 39', 56'	Report	Currie 4'; Henderson 49'

Stadium:
National Hockey Centre

5 April 2014
11:00

WA (Western Australia)	9–0	(Northern Territory) NT
Lloyd 7', 56'; Hill 30'; Tate 26', 55', 69'; Rasmussen 30', 35', 67'	Report

Stadium:
National Hockey Centre

5 April 2014
15:00

ACT (Australian Capital Territory)	2–0	(South Australia) SA
Baldwin 56'; Sinclair 67'	Report

Stadium:
National Hockey Centre

6 April 2014
10:00

SA (South Australia)	6–4	(Northern Territory) NT
Cameron 39'; Willson 45'; Busiko 53'; Anastasiou 61', 67'; Casey 63'	Report	Edgar 17', 37'; J. Andrade 30'; Southwood 34'

Stadium:
National Hockey Centre

6 April 2014
14:00

VIC Blue (Victoria (state))	2–2	(Western Australia) WA
Stock 16'; Hendry 38'	Report	Tate 3'; Golding 49'

Stadium:
National Hockey Centre

6 April 2014
18:00

VIC White (Victoria (state))	1–14	(New South Wales) NSW State
Coates 43'	Report	Hinton 3', 21'; Brand 13'; Lovett 15', 18', 41', 64'; Stewart 18'; Boyle 25', 69'; Butterick 29'; Farmilo 30', 53'; Hughes 64'

Stadium:
National Hockey Centre

8 April 2014
09:00

VIC White (Victoria (state))	2–7	(Western Australia) WA
Lyon 7'; Rennie 62'	Report	Rasmussen 5'; De Bes 28'; Golding 37'; Lloyd 44'; Bird 46'; Gerrard 48'; Barton 54'

Stadium:
National Hockey Centre

8 April 2014
13:00

SA (South Australia)	1–5	(Victoria (state)) VIC Blue
Casey 40'	Report	Braithwaite 10'; Parry 40'; Allan 49'; McBride 68'; Forsyth 69'

Stadium:
National Hockey Centre

8 April 2014
17:00

QLD (Queensland)	7–0	(Northern Territory) NT
Gilmour 5', 26'; Warne 9', 18', 68'; Rintala 17', 64'	Report

Stadium:
National Hockey Centre

9 April 2014
10:00

WA (Western Australia)	3–0	(Tasmania) TAS
Rasmussen 27', 30'; Golding 50'	Report

Stadium:
National Hockey Centre

9 April 2014
12:00

SA (South Australia)	2–3	(Victoria (state)) VIC White
Casey 5'; Willson 54'	Report	Lyon 24'; Henderson 34'; Coates 40'

Stadium:
National Hockey Centre

9 April 2014
16:00

NT (Northern Territory)	1–6	(Victoria (state)) VIC Blue
Coolwell 34'	Report	Hassall 2'; Parry 6', 47'; Stock 52'; Allan 61'; Steffens 65'

Stadium:
National Hockey Centre

==== Pool B ====
Pos	Team	Pld	W	D	L	GF	GA	GD	Pts	Qualification
1	(Queensland) QLD	5	4	1	0	32	11	+21	13	Advance to Semi-finals
2	(New South Wales) NSW State	5	4	0	1	35	8	+27	12	Advance to Semi-finals
3	(New South Wales) NSW Blue	5	2	0	3	11	22	−11	6	
4	(Australian Capital Territory) ACT	5	1	1	3	7	13	−6	4	
5	(Tasmania) TAS	5	0	2	3	5	21	−16	2	

Source: Hockey Australia
Rules for classification: 1) points; 2) matches won; 3) goal difference; 4) goals for; 5) head-to-head result; 6) field goals scored.

4 April 2014
13:00

QLD (Queensland)	6–4	(New South Wales) NSW State
Weyer 13', 59'; Gilmour 14', 51'; Warne 22'; Pavitt 67'	Report	Hinton 7'; Hughes 20', 49'; Farmilo 45'

Stadium:
National Hockey Centre

4 April 2014
17:00

TAS (Tasmania)	1–1	(Australian Capital Territory) ACT
Austin 43'	Report	Sinclair 6'

Stadium:
National Hockey Centre

4 April 2014
21:00

VIC Blue (Victoria (state))	6–2	(New South Wales) NSW Blue
Scanlon 21', 35+'; Hendry 40'; Allan 57'; Parry 58'; McBride 66'	Report	Sharp 4'; Donovan 69'

Stadium:
National Hockey Centre

5 April 2014
13:00

TAS (Tasmania)	3–3	(Queensland) QLD
Austin 11', 37'; McCarthy 18'	Report	Rintala 14', 29'; Anderson 27'

Stadium:
National Hockey Centre

5 April 2014
15:00

ACT (Australian Capital Territory)	2–0	(South Australia) SA
Baldwin 56'; Sinclair 67'	Report

Stadium:
National Hockey Centre

5 April 2014
17:00

NSW State (New South Wales)	5–0	(New South Wales) NSW Blue
Flack 14'; Farmilo 33'; Hinton 42', 62'; Lovett 63'	Report

Stadium:
National Hockey Centre

6 April 2014
12:00

ACT (Australian Capital Territory)	2–7	(Queensland) QLD
Sinclair 30'; Whittle 49'	Report	Gilmour 24'; Carseldine 28'; Crane 32'; Pavitt 35'; Rintala 41', 53'; Warne 42'

Stadium:
National Hockey Centre

6 April 2014
16:00

NSW Blue (New South Wales)	4–0	(Tasmania) TAS
Doolan 3'; Donovan 50'; Anderson 53'; J. Staines 57'	Report

Stadium:
National Hockey Centre

6 April 2014
18:00

VIC White (Victoria (state))	1–14	(New South Wales) NSW State
Coates 43'	Report	Hinton 3', 21'; Brand 13'; Lovett 15', 18', 41', 64'; Stewart 18'; Boyle 25', 69'; Butterick 29'; Farmilo 30', 53'; Hughes 64'

Stadium:
National Hockey Centre

8 April 2014
11:00

NSW State (New South Wales)	10–1	(Tasmania) TAS
Brand 14', 27', 45'; Harrison 17', 57'; Hinton 22'; Lovett 24'; Stewart 50', 61'; Boyle 51'	Report	Honey 11'

Stadium:
National Hockey Centre

8 April 2014
15:00

NSW Blue (New South Wales)	3–2	(Australian Capital Territory) ACT
J. Staines 6'; Carr 57'; Miotto 70'	Report	McLennan 52'; Baker 65'

Stadium:
National Hockey Centre

8 April 2014
17:00

QLD (Queensland)	7–0	(Northern Territory) NT
Gilmour 5', 26'; Warne 9', 18', 68'; Rintala 17', 64'	Report

Stadium:
National Hockey Centre

9 April 2014
10:00

WA (Western Australia)	3–0	(Tasmania) TAS
Rasmussen 27', 30'; Golding 50'	Report

Stadium:
National Hockey Centre

9 April 2014
14:00

NSW State (New South Wales)	2–0	(Australian Capital Territory) ACT
Stewart 49'; Boyle 63'	Report

Stadium:
National Hockey Centre

9 April 2014
18:00

QLD (Queensland)	9–2	(New South Wales) NSW Blue
Carseldine 12', 40', 69'; Crane 15', 39'; Gibbs 22'; Gilmour 35', 46', 62'	Report	J. Staines 54'; Sharp 55'

Stadium:
National Hockey Centre

=== Classification round ===
==== Fifth to tenth place classification ====
Pos	Team	Pld	W	WD	LD	L	GF	GA	GD	Pts	Qualification
1	(New South Wales) NSW Blue	1	1	0	0	0	4	3	+1	3	Fifth-place match
2	(Tasmania) TAS	1	1	0	0	0	1	0	+1	3	Fifth-place match
3	(Australian Capital Territory) ACT	1	0	1	0	0	2	2	0	2	Seventh-place match
4	(South Australia) SA	1	0	0	1	0	2	2	0	1	Seventh-place match
5	(Northern Territory) NT	1	0	0	0	1	3	4	−1	0	Ninth-place match
6	(Victoria (state)) VIC White	1	0	0	0	1	0	1	−1	0	Ninth-place match

Source: Hockey Australia
Rules for classification: 1) points; 2) matches won; 3) goal difference; 4) goals for; 5) head-to-head result; 6) field goals scored.

===== Crossover matches =====
11 April 2014
10:00

VIC White (Victoria (state))	0–1	(Tasmania) TAS
	Report	Austin 43'

Stadium:
National Hockey Centre

11 April 2014
12:00

SA (South Australia)	2–2	(Australian Capital Territory) ACT
Larwood 32'; Cameron 51'	Report	Sinclair 6'; Deane 38'
Penalties
	5–6

Stadium:
National Hockey Centre

11 April 2014
14:00

NSW Blue (New South Wales)	4–3	(Northern Territory) NT
Grey 5', 18'; Sharp 8', 56'	Report	J. Andrade 4', 14'; Coolwell 35'

Stadium:
National Hockey Centre

===== Ninth and tenth place =====
12 April 2014
08:30

NT (Northern Territory)	3–3	(Victoria (state)) VIC White
Edgar 3'; I. Andrade 7'; Rintala 60'	Report	Rennie 32'; Aquino 59'; Minchin 61'
Penalties
	3–1

Stadium:
National Hockey Centre

===== Seventh and eighth place =====
12 April 2014
10:45

ACT (Australian Capital Territory)	2–0	(South Australia) SA
Baker 18'; McLennan 26'	Report

Stadium:
National Hockey Centre

===== Fifth and sixth place =====
12 April 2014
13:00

NSW Blue (New South Wales)	5–1	(Tasmania) TAS
Miotto 8'; Doolan 28'; Carr 35'; Sharp 62'; Mayo 70'	Report	Burgess 54'

Stadium:
National Hockey Centre

==== First to fourth place classification ====
Semi-Finals
11 April 2014
(Western Australia) WA	3 (3)
(New South Wales) NSW State (pen.)	3 (4)
11 April 2014
(Queensland) QLD	4
(Victoria (state)) VIC Blue	2

Final
12 April 2014
(New South Wales) NSW State	2
(Queensland) QLD	8
Third place
12 April 2014
(Western Australia) WA	5
(Victoria (state)) VIC Blue	1

===== Semi-finals =====
11 April 2014
16:00

QLD (Queensland)	4–2	(Victoria (state)) VIC Blue
Howard 17'; Gilmour 47'; Rintala 53', 62'	Report	Allan 51'; Scanlon 67'

Stadium:
National Hockey Centre

11 April 2014
18:00

WA (Western Australia)	3–3	(New South Wales) NSW State
Bird 34'; Rasmussen 36'; Benetti 61'	Report	Hughes 22'; Farmilo 42'; Butterick 45'
Penalties
	3–4

Stadium:
National Hockey Centre

===== Third and fourth place =====
12 April 2014
15:15

WA (Western Australia)	5–1	(Victoria (state)) VIC Blue
Barton 10'; Thomas 19'; De Bes 47', 69'; Rasmussen 59'	Report	Stock 40'

Stadium:
National Hockey Centre

===== Final =====
12 April 2014
17:30

NSW State (New South Wales)	2–8	(Queensland) QLD
Ninness 8'; Butterick 9'	Report	Pavitt 17'; O'Driscoll 30', 67', 70'; Fletcher 43'; Mackay 53'; Weyer 55'; Carseldine 60'

Stadium:
National Hockey Centre

== Awards ==
Player of the Tournament	Top Goalscorer(s)	Fair Play Award
(New South Wales) Nathanael Stewart	(Queensland) Tyler Gilmour (Western Australia) Alec Rasmussen	(New South Wales) NSW Blue AND (Queensland) QLD

== Statistics ==
=== Final standings ===
Pos	Team	Pld	W	D	L	GF	GA	GD	Pts	Final Result
1st place, gold medalist(s)	(Queensland) QLD	7	6	1	0	44	15	+29	19	Gold Medal
2nd place, silver medalist(s)	(New South Wales) NSW State	7	4	1	2	40	19	+21	13	Silver Medal
3rd place, bronze medalist(s)	(Western Australia) WA	7	5	2	0	34	8	+26	17	Bronze Medal
4	(Victoria (state)) VIC Blue	7	4	1	2	27	17	+10	13	
5	(New South Wales) NSW Blue	7	4	0	3	20	26	−6	12	
6	(Tasmania) TAS	7	1	2	4	7	26	−19	5	
7	(Australian Capital Territory) ACT	7	2	2	3	11	15	−4	8	
8	(South Australia) SA	7	1	1	5	11	23	−12	4	
9	(Northern Territory) NT	7	0	1	6	12	37	−25	1	
10	(Victoria (state)) VIC White	7	2	1	4	13	33	−20	7	

Source: Hockey Australia
