= 2015 Under 18 Women's Australian Championships =

Tournament details
- Host country: Australia
- City: Adelaide
- Teams: 10
- Venue: State Hockey Centre

Final positions
- Champions: (Queensland) QLD
- Runner-up: (Victoria (state)) VIC Blue
- Third place: (Western Australia) WA

Tournament statistics
- Matches played: 35
- Goals scored: 146 (4.17 per match)
- Top scorer: (Victoria (state)) Madi Ratcliffe (8 goals)

The 2015 Women's Under 18 Australian Championships was the a field hockey tournament held in the South Australia city of Adelaide between 8–16 April 2015.

Queensland won the gold medal by defeating Victoria Blue 4–0 in the final. Western Australia won the bronze medal by defeating New South Wales 2–0 in the third and fourth place playoff.

== Competition format ==
The tournament is divided into two pools, Pool A and Pool B, each consisting of five teams in a round robin format. Throughout the pool stage however, teams from each pool competed in crossover matches with the teams in the other pool, with each team playing one crossover match.

At the conclusion of the pool stage, the top two teams of Pools A and B progress through to the semi-finals, where the top placed teams of each pool compete against the second placed team of each pool, with the winners progressing to the final.

The bottom six teams then progress to Pool C, carrying over points from previous matches. Final rankings in Pool C determine final ranking overall.

== Teams ==
Unlike other National Australian Championships, teams from New South Wales, Queensland and Victoria are eligible to enter two teams.

- (Australian Capital Territory) ACT
- (New South Wales) NSW State
- (New South Wales) NSW Blue
- (Northern Territory) NT
- (Queensland) QLD
- (South Australia) SA
- (Tasmania) TAS
- (Victoria (state)) VIC Blue
- (Victoria (state)) VIC White
- (Western Australia) WA

== Results ==
=== First round ===
- Note: points from crossover matches have been added into the teams' respective pools, and dates and times of crossover matches has been bolded.

==== Pool A ====
Pos	Team	Pld	W	D	L	GF	GA	GD	Pts	Qualification
1	(Queensland) QLD	5	4	0	1	17	8	+9	**12**	Advance to Semi-finals
2	(Victoria (state)) VIC Blue	5	3	0	2	16	9	+7	**9**	Advance to Semi-finals
3	(Tasmania) TAS	5	1	2	2	10	14	−4	**5**	
4	(New South Wales) NSW Blue	5	1	1	3	7	9	−2	**4**	
5	(South Australia) SA	5	1	0	4	8	20	−12	**3**	

Source: Hockey Australia

8 April 2015
09:00

TAS (Tasmania)	2 – 6	(Victoria (state)) VIC Blue
Murphy 59'; Challis 67'	Report	Ratcliffe 3', 46', 56'; Colasurdo 14'; Utri 26'; Russ 35'

State Hockey Centre
Umpires:
Alycia Amundson (AUS)
Jessica Fox (AUS)

8 April 2015
11:00

QLD (Queensland)	3 – 2	(New South Wales) NSW Blue
Whipp 22'; Hawkey 30'; Greiner 63'	Report	Hamment 33'; Pritchard 68'

State Hockey Centre
Umpires:
Kelby Pointon (AUS)
Nicola Brown (AUS)

**8 April 2015**
**17:00**

SA (South Australia)	3 – 1	(Victoria (state)) VIC White
Holland-Smith 31'; McKenna 50'; Mallinson 59'	Report	Arneil 12'

State Hockey Centre
Umpires:
Caroline Davis (AUS)
Brydie Wellham (AUS)

9 April 2015
13:00

QLD (Queensland)	3 – 0	(Victoria (state)) VIC Blue
Malone 9'; Greiner 20', 42'	Report

State Hockey Centre
Umpires:
Caroline Davis (AUS)
Alycia Amundson (AUS)

9 April 2015
15:00

SA (South Australia)	2 – 4	(Tasmania) TAS
Spano 5', 37'	Report	Hinton 8'; Curtis 14'; Murphy 23', 24'

State Hockey Centre
Umpires:
Nicola Brown (AUS)
Deborah O'Connell (AUS)

**9 April 2015**
**17:00**

NSW Blue (New South Wales)	1 – 2	(Northern Territory) NT
Radcliffe 49'	Report	Porter 26'; Smith 53'

State Hockey Centre
Umpires:
Morgan-Leigh Leeder (AUS)
Jessica Fox (AUS)

11 April 2015
09:00

VIC Blue (Victoria (state))	3 – 0	(New South Wales) NSW Blue
Ratcliffe 28', 62'; Anderson 46'	Report

State Hockey Centre
Umpires:
Deborah O'Connell (AUS)
Leonie Young (AUS)

11 April 2015
11:00

QLD (Queensland)	6 – 1	(South Australia) SA
Greiner 5'; Malone 30'; Deeth 40'; Lowry 43'; Whipp 60'; Barrett 62'	Report	McKenna 28'

State Hockey Centre
Umpires:
Brydie Wellham (AUS)
Alycia Amundson (AUS)

**11 April 2015**
**17:00**

WA (Western Australia)	1 – 1	(Tasmania) TAS
Morgan 28'	Report	Hinton 70+'

State Hockey Centre
Umpires:
Claire Butcher (AUS)
Caroline Davis (AUS)

12 April 2015
13:00

TAS (Tasmania)	2 – 4	QLD (Queensland)
Challis 26'; Haas 55'	Report	Whipp 9'; Barrett 29', 39', 70'

State Hockey Centre
Umpires:
Brydie Wellham (AUS)
Alycia Amundson (AUS)

12 April 2015
15:00

NSW Blue (New South Wales)	3 – 0	(South Australia) SA
Martin 26'; Coupe 34'; Pritchard 62'	Report

State Hockey Centre
Umpires:
Leonie Young (AUS)
Kelby Pointon (AUS)

**12 April 2015**
**17:00**

VIC Blue (Victoria (state))	1 – 2	(Australian Capital Territory) ACT
Philpott 5'	Report	Evans 30', 58'

State Hockey Centre
Umpires:
Claire Butcher (AUS)
Jessica Fox (AUS)

13 April 2015
09:00

TAS (Tasmania)	1 – 1	(New South Wales) NSW Blue
Challis 62'	Report	Pritchard 13'

State Hockey Centre
Umpires:
Morgan-Leigh Leeder (AUS)
Leonie Young (AUS)

13 April 2015
11:00

VIC Blue (Victoria (state))	6 – 2	(South Australia) SA
Colasurdo 43'; Russ 45'; James 49'; Ratcliffe 57', 61'; Utri 58'	Report	Mallinson 20'; McKenna 41'

State Hockey Centre
Umpires:
Brydie Wellham (AUS)
Kelby Pointon (AUS)

**13 April 2015**
**17:00**

QLD (Queensland)	1 – 3	(New South Wales) NSW State
Hawkey 55'	Report	Stewart 14', 25'; Capaldi 19'

State Hockey Centre
Umpires:
Leonie Young (AUS)
Caroline Davis (AUS)

==== Pool B ====
Pos	Team	Pld	W	D	L	GF	GA	GD	Pts	Qualification
1	(New South Wales) NSW State	5	4	1	0	17	3	+14	**13**	Advance to Semi-finals
2	(Western Australia) WA	5	3	2	0	15	1	+14	**11**	Advance to Semi-finals
3	(Australian Capital Territory) ACT	5	3	0	2	12	9	+3	**9**	
4	(Northern Territory) NT	5	2	0	3	10	13	−3	**6**	
5	(Victoria (state)) VIC White	5	0	0	5	3	29	−26	**0**	

Source: Hockey Australia

8 April 2015
13:00

NSW State (New South Wales)	3 – 0	(Northern Territory) NT
Gillard 43'; Stewart 50'; Wilson 59'	Report

State Hockey Centre
Umpires:
Alycia Amundson (AUS)
Jessica Fox (AUS)

8 April 2015
15:00

ACT (Australian Capital Territory)	0 – 2	(Western Australia) WA
	Report	Morgan 46'; Gibbs 61'

State Hockey Centre
Umpires:
Leonie Young (AUS)
Morgan-Leigh Leeder (AUS)

**8 April 2015**
**17:00**

SA (South Australia)	3 – 1	(Victoria (state)) VIC White
Holland-Smith 31'; McKenna 50'; Mallinson 59'	Report	Arneil 12'

State Hockey Centre
Umpires:
Caroline Davis (AUS)
Brydie Wellham (AUS)

9 April 2015
09:00

NSW State (New South Wales)	3 – 2	(Australian Capital Territory) ACT
Stewart 14'; Arnott 39'; Wilson 69'	Report	Monfries 21'; Cornish 48'

State Hockey Centre
Umpires:
Leonie Young (AUS)
Claire Butcher (AUS)

9 April 2015
11:00

VIC White (Victoria (state))	0 – 8	(Western Australia) WA
	Report	Morgan 7', 39'; Bestall 16'; Collard 40', 58' del Borello 50'; Green 65'; Capewell 68'

State Hockey Centre
Umpires:
Kelby Pointon (AUS)
Brydie Wellham (AUS)

**9 April 2015**
**17:00**

NSW Blue (New South Wales)	1 – 2	(Northern Territory) NT
Radcliffe 49'	Report	Porter 26'; Smith 53'

State Hockey Centre
Umpires:
Morgan-Leigh Leeder (AUS)
Jessica Fox (AUS)

11 April 2015
13:00

NSW State (New South Wales)	8 – 0	(Victoria (state)) VIC White
Steel 3'; Stewart 14', 45'; Wilson 25'; McCauley 26'; Arnott 53'; Barrett 55'; Gillard 60'	Report

State Hockey Centre
Umpires:
Kelby Pointon (AUS)
Morgan-Leigh Leeder (AUS)

11 April 2015
15:00

ACT (Australian Capital Territory)	5 – 1	(Northern Territory) NT
Cornish 6'; Apps 10'; Deacon 33'; Evans 56', 57'	Report	Conca 54'

State Hockey Centre
Umpires:
Jessica Fox (AUS)
Nicola Brown (AUS)

**11 April 2015**
**17:00**

WA (Western Australia)	1 – 1	(Tasmania) TAS
Morgan 28'	Report	Hinton 70+'

State Hockey Centre
Umpires:
Claire Butcher (AUS)
Caroline Davis (AUS)

12 April 2015
09:00

NT (Northern Territory)	7 – 0	(Victoria (state)) VIC White
Barba 6', 14'; Conca 20'; Graf 34', 36'; Lidbetter 51'; Stephenson 57'	Report

State Hockey Centre
Umpires:
Caroline Davis (AUS)
Morgan-Leigh Leeder (AUS)

12 April 2015
11:00

WA (Western Australia)	0 – 0	(New South Wales) NSW State
	Report

State Hockey Centre
Umpires:
Deborah O'Connell (AUS)
Alycia Amundson (AUS)

**12 April 2015**
**17:00**

VIC Blue (Victoria (state))	1 – 2	(Australian Capital Territory) ACT
Philpott 5'	Report	Evans 30', 58'

State Hockey Centre
Umpires:
Claire Butcher (AUS)
Jessica Fox (AUS)

12 April 2015
13:00

WA (Western Australia)	4 – 0	(Northern Territory) NT
Fidoe 1'; Collard 4', 7', 9'	Report

State Hockey Centre
Umpires:
Nicola Brown (AUS)
Alycia Amundson (AUS)

13 April 2015
15:00

ACT (Australian Capital Territory)	3 – 2	(Victoria (state)) VIC White
Deacon 50'; Evans 60'; Price 61'	Report	Pell 41'; Riley 53'

State Hockey Centre
Umpires:
Claire Butcher (AUS)
Deborah O'Connell (AUS)

**13 April 2015**
**17:00**

QLD (Queensland)	1 – 3	(New South Wales) NSW State
Hawkey 55'	Report	Stewart 14', 25'; Capaldi 19'

State Hockey Centre
Umpires:
Leonie Young (AUS)
Caroline Davis (AUS)

=== Second round ===
- Note: results from previous crossover matches (including teams not in Pool C) were included in Pool C rankings.

==== Pool C (Classification Round) ====
Pos	Team	Pld	W	D	L	GF	GA	GD	Pts
1	(Australian Capital Territory) ACT	5	5	0	0	15	7	+8	15
2	(Tasmania) TAS	5	3	2	0	11	6	+5	11
3	(Northern Territory) NT	5	3	0	2	15	7	+8	9
4	(New South Wales) NSW Blue	5	1	2	2	8	7	+1	5
5	(South Australia) SA	5	1	0	4	6	15	−9	3
6	(Victoria (state)) VIC White	5	0	1	4	6	18	−12	1

Source: Hockey Australia

15 April 2015
09:00

NSW Blue (New South Wales)	2 – 2	(Victoria (state)) VIC White
Hardy 4'; Steinert 11'	Report	Malligan 30'; Sutherland 48'

State Hockey Centre
Umpires:
Kelby Pointon (AUS)
Claire Butcher (AUS)

15 April 2015
11:00

SA (South Australia)	1 – 2	(Australian Capital Territory) ACT
Spano 54'	Report	Cornish 2'; Deacon 49'

State Hockey Centre
Umpires:
Jessica Fox (AUS)
Nicola Brown (AUS)

15 April 2015
13:00

TAS (Tasmania)	1 – 0	(Northern Territory) NT
Challis 12'	Report

State Hockey Centre
Umpires:
Morgan-Leigh Leeder (AUS)
Brydie Wellham (AUS)

16 April 2015
08:30

TAS (Tasmania)	3 – 1	(Victoria (state)) VIC White
O'Conor 2'; Hinton 54', 56'	Report	Malligan 9'

State Hockey Centre
Umpires:
Claire Butcher (AUS)
Brydie Wellham (AUS)

16 April 2015
09:00

SA (South Australia)	0 – 5	(Northern Territory) NT
	Report	Conca 14'; Porter 48'; Smith 57'; Stephenson 58'; Graf 69'

State Hockey Centre
Umpires:
Jessica Fox (AUS)
Kelby Pointon (AUS)

16 April 2015
10:30

NSW Blue (New South Wales)	1 – 2	(Australian Capital Territory) ACT
Martin 43'	Report	Evans 26'; Cornish 44'

State Hockey Centre
Umpires:
Morgan-Leigh Leeder (AUS)
Nicola Brown (AUS)

==== First to fourth place classification ====
Semi-finals
15 April 2015
**(Queensland) QLD**	**3**
(Western Australia) WA	0
15 April 2015
(New South Wales) NSW State	0
**(Victoria (state)) VIC Blue**	**2**

Final
16 April 2015
**(Queensland) QLD**	**4**
(Victoria (state)) VIC Blue	0
Third and fourth place
16 April 2015
**(Western Australia) WA**	**2**
(New South Wales) NSW State	0

===== Semi-finals =====
15 April 2015
15:00

QLD (Queensland)	3 – 0	(Western Australia) WA
Barrett 24', 70'; Wollstein 31'	Report

State Hockey Centre
Umpires:
Alycia Amundson (AUS)
Caroline Davis (AUS)

15 April 2015
17:00

NSW State (New South Wales)	0 – 2	(Victoria (state)) VIC Blue
	Report	Colasurdo 13'; Ratcliffe 42'

State Hockey Centre
Umpires:
Leonie Young (AUS)
Deborah O'Connell (AUS)

===== Third and fourth place =====
16 April 2015
12:30

WA (Western Australia)	2 – 0	(New South Wales) NSW State
Collard 25'; Tonkin 33'	Report

State Hockey Centre
Umpires:
Leonie Young (AUS)
Caroline Davis (AUS)

===== Final =====
16 April 2015
15:00

QLD (Queensland)	4 – 0	(Victoria (state)) VIC Blue
Barrett 11'; Eleison 16'; Wollstein 27'; Deeth 33'	Report

State Hockey Centre
Umpires:
Alycia Amundson (AUS)
Deborah O'Connell (AUS)

== Statistics ==
=== Final standings ===
Pos	Team	Pld	W	D	L	GF	GA	GD	Pts	Final Result
1st place, gold medalist(s)	(Queensland) QLD	7	6	0	1	24	8	+16	18	Gold Medal
2nd place, silver medalist(s)	(Victoria (state)) VIC Blue	7	4	0	3	18	13	+5	12	Silver Medal
3rd place, bronze medalist(s)	(Western Australia) WA	7	4	2	1	17	4	+13	14	Bronze Medal
4	(New South Wales) NSW State	7	4	1	2	17	7	+10	13	Fourth Place
5	(Australian Capital Territory) ACT	7	5	0	2	16	11	+5	15	Fifth Place
6	(Tasmania) TAS	7	3	2	2	14	15	−1	11	Sixth Place
7	(Northern Territory) NT	7	3	0	4	15	14	+1	9	Seventh Place
8	(New South Wales) NSW Blue	7	1	2	4	10	13	−3	5	Eighth Place
9	(South Australia) SA	7	1	0	6	9	27	−18	3	Ninth Place
10	(Victoria (state)) VIC White	7	0	1	6	6	34	−28	1	Tenth Place

Source: Hockey Australia
