= 2014 Under 18 Women's Australian Hockey Championships =

2014 Under 18 Women's Australian Championships
Tournament details
- Host country: Australia
- City: Melbourne
- Teams: 10
- Venue: State Netball and Hockey Centre

Final positions
- Champions: (Queensland) QLD
- Runner-up: (New South Wales) NSW State
- Third place: (Victoria (state)) VIC Blue

Tournament statistics
- Matches played: 35
- Goals scored: 159 (4.54 per match)
- Top scorer: (Queensland) Madison Fitzpatrick (11 goals)
- Best player: (New South Wales) Grace Stewart

The 2014 Women's Under 18 Australian Championships was a field hockey tournament held in the Victorian city of Melbourne.

Queensland won the gold medal by defeating the New South Wales 5–2 in the final. Victoria Blue won the bronze medal by defeating Australian Capital Territory 3–2 in the third and fourth place playoff.

== Competition format ==
The tournament is divided into two pools, Pool A and Pool B, each consisting of five teams in a round robin format. Throughout the pool stage however, teams from each pool competed in crossover matches with the teams in the other pool, with each team playing one crossover match.

At the conclusion of the pool stage, the top two teams of Pools A and B progressed through to the semi-finals, where the top placed teams of each pool competed against the second placed team of each pool, with the winners progressing to the final.

The bottom three teams then play in crossover matches with teams from the other pool, the results of these matches determine the playoff games, with best results playing for fifth and worst results playing for 9th.

== Teams ==
Unlike other National Australian Championships, teams from New South Wales, Queensland and Victoria are eligible to enter two teams.

- (Australian Capital Territory) ACT
- (New South Wales) NSW State
- (New South Wales) NSW Blue
- (Northern Territory) NT
- (Queensland) QLD
- (South Australia) SA
- (Tasmania) TAS
- (Victoria (state)) VIC Blue
- (Victoria (state)) VIC White
- (Western Australia) WA

== Results ==
=== Preliminary round ===
- Each team played one crossover match; points have been added to teams' respective pools.

==== Pool A ====
Pos	Team	Pld	W	D	L	GF	GA	GD	Pts	Qualification
1	(New South Wales) NSW State	5	5	0	0	21	1	+20	15	Advance to Semi-finals
2	(Victoria (state)) VIC Blue	5	2	1	2	16	9	+7	7	Advance to Semi-finals
3	(Western Australia) WA	5	2	1	2	8	7	+1	7	
4	(Tasmania) TAS	5	2	0	3	4	12	−8	6	
5	(New South Wales) NSW Blue	5	1	0	4	4	12	−8	3	

Source: Hockey Australia

4 April 2014
13:30

TAS (Tasmania)	2–1	(New South Wales) NSW Blue
Poke 32'; Curtis 54'	Report	Rekunow 10'

Stadium:
State Netball and Hockey Centre

4 April 2014
15:30

VIC Blue (Victoria (state))	2–2	(Western Australia) WA
Ratcliffe 56', 67'	Report	Collard 63'; Peacock 66'

Stadium:
State Netball and Hockey Centre

4 April 2014
17:30

VIC White (Victoria (state))	0–8	(New South Wales) NSW State
	Report	Leard 6'; Stewart 19'; Constable 23'; Divall 26', 42', 65'; Arnott 46'; Wilson 68'

Stadium:
State Netball and Hockey Centre

5 April 2014
10:00

VIC Blue (Victoria (state))	8–1	(South Australia) SA
Ratcliffe 1'; Russ 9'; Colasurdo 11', 47'; Brennan 13', 64'; Hatton 16'; Down 68'	Report	Warrender 57'

Stadium:
State Netball and Hockey Centre

5 April 2014
12:00

TAS (Tasmania)	1–0	(Western Australia) WA
Kenworthy 68'	Report

Stadium:
State Netball and Hockey Centre

5 April 2014
16:00

NSW State (New South Wales)	2–0	(New South Wales) NSW Blue
Stewart 35'; Arnott 39'	Report

Stadium:
State Netball and Hockey Centre

6 April 2014
09:30

VIC Blue (Victoria (state))	3–0	(Tasmania) TAS
Utri 25'; Ratcliffe 39'; Russ 60'	Report

Stadium:
State Netball and Hockey Centre

6 April 2014
13:30

NSW State (New South Wales)	4–0	(Western Australia) WA
Stewart 6'; Gillard 16'; Divall 45'; Hayes 50'	Report

Stadium:
State Netball and Hockey Centre

6 April 2014
17:30

NSW Blue (New South Wales)	0–5	(Queensland) QLD
	Report	Taylor 14'; Fitzpatrick 38', 58', 68'; Barrett 66'

Stadium:
State Netball and Hockey Centre

8 April 2014
10:00

WA (Western Australia)	1–0	(New South Wales) NSW Blue
Capewell 40'	Report

Stadium:
State Netball and Hockey Centre

8 April 2014
12:00

ACT (Australian Capital Territory)	4–1	(Tasmania) TAS
Martens 26'; Evans 30', 56', 69'	Report	Kirkland 61'

Stadium:
State Netball and Hockey Centre

8 April 2014
14:00

VIC Blue (Victoria (state))	1–3	(New South Wales) NSW State
Ratcliffe 49'	Report	Arnott 7'; Wilson 63', 66'

Stadium:
State Netball and Hockey Centre

9 April 2014
09:30

TAS (Tasmania)	0–4	(New South Wales) NSW State
	Report	Wilson 4', 37'; Divall 57'; Smith 57'

Stadium:
State Netball and Hockey Centre

9 April 2014
11:30

NSW Blue (New South Wales)	3–2	(Victoria (state)) VIC Blue
Bosman 27'; Barrett 42'; Hardy 61'	Report	Ratcliffe 21'; Down 38'

Stadium:
State Netball and Hockey Centre

9 April 2014
15:30

WA (Western Australia)	5–0	(Northern Territory) NT
S. Tonkin 20'; Collard 35'; Capewell 40'; M. Tonkin 41', 42'	Report

Stadium:
State Netball and Hockey Centre

==== Pool B ====
Pos	Team	Pld	W	D	L	GF	GA	GD	Pts	Qualification
1	(Queensland) QLD	5	4	0	1	29	2	+27	12	Advance to Semi-finals
2	(Australian Capital Territory) ACT	5	4	0	1	15	9	+6	12	Advance to Semi-finals
3	(Northern Territory) NT	5	2	0	3	7	11	−4	6	
4	(South Australia) SA	5	2	0	3	9	24	−15	6	
5	(Victoria (state)) VIC White	5	0	0	5	0	26	−26	0	

Source: Hockey Australia

4 April 2014
09:30

ACT (Australian Capital Territory)	0–4	(Queensland) QLD
	Report	Malone 28'; Taylor 33'; Fitzpatrick 39', 50'

Stadium:
State Netball and Hockey Centre

4 April 2014
11:30

NT (Northern Territory)	2–3	(South Australia) SA
Higgns 48'; Jones 50'	Report	Mallinson 4'; Draper 29'; Spano 35'

Stadium:
State Netball and Hockey Centre

4 April 2014
17:30

VIC White (Victoria (state))	0–8	(New South Wales) NSW State
	Report	Leard 6'; Stewart 19'; Constable 23'; Divall 26', 42', 65'; Arnott 46'; Wilson 68'

Stadium:
State Netball and Hockey Centre

5 April 2014
10:00

VIC Blue (Victoria (state))	8–1	(South Australia) SA
Ratcliffe 1'; Russ 9'; Colasurdo 11', 47'; Brennan 13', 64'; Hatton 16'; Down 68'	Report	Warrender 57'

Stadium:
State Netball and Hockey Centre

5 April 2014
14:00

ACT (Australian Capital Territory)	3–2	(Northern Territory) NT
Toole 9'; Cornish 14', 17'	Report	Jones 15'; Lidbetter 43'

Stadium:
State Netball and Hockey Centre

5 April 2014
18:00

VIC White (Victoria (state))	0–12	(Queensland) QLD
	Report	Hetherington 2', 15'; Fitzpatrick 20', 41', 44', 52'; Boyd 31'; Barrett 47'; Wilkinson 55'; Malone 56', 61'; Hillas 60'

Stadium:
State Netball and Hockey Centre

6 April 2014
11:30

SA (South Australia)	2–6	(Australian Capital Territory) ACT
Holland-Smith 12'; Welstead 70'	Report	Slater 5'; Monfries 50', 55'; Taseska 59'; Evans 60'; Cornish 64'

Stadium:
State Netball and Hockey Centre

6 April 2014
15:30

VIC White (Victoria (state))	0–2	(Northern Territory) NT
	Report	Jones 4'; Graf 32'

Stadium:
State Netball and Hockey Centre

6 April 2014
17:30

NSW Blue (New South Wales)	0–5	(Queensland) QLD
	Report	Taylor 14'; Fitzpatrick 38', 58', 68'; Barrett 66'

Stadium:
State Netball and Hockey Centre

8 April 2014
12:00

ACT (Australian Capital Territory)	4–1	(Tasmania) TAS
Martens 26'; Evans 30', 56', 69'	Report	Kirkland 61'

Stadium:
State Netball and Hockey Centre

8 April 2014
16:00

SA (South Australia)	2–0	(Victoria (state)) VIC White
Spano 3'; Draper 47'	Report

Stadium:
State Netball and Hockey Centre

8 April 2014
18:00

NT (Northern Territory)	1–0	(Queensland) QLD
Graf 31'	Report

Stadium:
State Netball and Hockey Centre

9 April 2014
13:30

QLD (Queensland)	8–1	(South Australia) SA
Taylor 18', 29', 39', 58'; Russ 41'; Hetherington 55', 67'; Wilkinson 56'	Report	Spano 4'

Stadium:
State Netball and Hockey Centre

9 April 2014
15:30

WA (Western Australia)	5–0	(Northern Territory) NT
S. Tonkin 20'; Collard 35'; Capewell 40'; M. Tonkin 41', 42'	Report

Stadium:
State Netball and Hockey Centre

9 April 2014
17:30

ACT (Australian Capital Territory)	2–0	(Victoria (state)) VIC White
Slater 1'; Taseska 63'	Report

Stadium:
State Netball and Hockey Centre

=== Second round ===
==== Fifth to tenth place classification ====
Pos	Team	Pld	W	D	L	GF	GA	GD	Pts	Qualification
1	(Western Australia) WA	1	1	0	0	4	1	+3	3	Fifth Place Match
2	(Tasmania) TAS	1	1	0	0	3	0	+3	3	Fifth Place Match
3	(New South Wales) NSW Blue	1	1	0	0	2	1	+1	3	Seventh Place Match
4	(Northern Territory) NT	1	0	0	1	1	2	−1	0	Seventh Place Match
5	(South Australia) SA	1	0	0	1	0	3	−3	0	Ninth Place Match
6	(Victoria (state)) VIC White	1	0	0	1	1	4	−3	0	Ninth Place Match

Source: Hockey Australia
Rules for classification: 1) points; 2) matches won; 3) goal difference; 4) goals for; 5) head-to-head result; 6) field goals scored.

===== Crossover matches =====
11 April 2014

WA (Western Australia)	4–1	(Victoria (state)) VIC White
Moness 21'; Peacock 43'; S. Tonkin 54'; Bell 58'	Report	Sutherland 50'

Stadium:
State Netball and Hockey Centre

11 April 2014

TAS (Tasmania)	3–0	(South Australia) SA
Poke 18'; Hinton 63'; Goldsmith 70'	Report

Stadium:
State Netball and Hockey Centre

11 April 2014

NSW Blue (New South Wales)	2–1	(Northern Territory) NT
Blamey 27'; Williams 65'	Report	Scholl 31'

Stadium:
State Netball and Hockey Centre

===== Ninth and tenth place =====
12 April 2014

SA (South Australia)	3–2	(Victoria (state)) VIC White
Draper 30'; Lewis 52'; MacLachlan 67'	Report	James 55'; Phillips 69'

Stadium:
State Netball and Hockey Centre

===== Seventh and eighth place =====
12 April 2014

NSW Blue (New South Wales)	2–1	(Northern Territory) NT
Hardy 39'; Wishart 57'	Report	Lidbetter 56'

Stadium:
State Netball and Hockey Centre

===== Fifth and sixth place =====
12 April 2014

WA (Western Australia)	3–0	(Tasmania) TAS
Baldwin 28'; Moness 50'; Peacock 62'	Report

Stadium:
State Netball and Hockey Centre

==== First to fourth place classification ====
Semi-Finals
11 April 2014
(New South Wales) NSW State	8
(Australian Capital Territory) ACT	0
11 April 2014
(Queensland) QLD	3
(Victoria (state)) VIC Blue	1

Gold Medal Match
12 April 2014
(New South Wales) NSW State	2
(Queensland) QLD	5
Broze Medal Match
12 April 2014
(Australian Capital Territory) ACT	2
(Victoria (state)) VIC Blue	3

===== Semi-finals =====
11 April 2014

NSW State (New South Wales)	8–0	(Australian Capital Territory) ACT
Stewart 16'; Leard 22', 46'; Nobbs 36'; Smith 52'; Hayes 65'; Capaldi 66'; Arnott 67'	Report

Stadium:
State Netball and Hockey Centre

11 April 2014

QLD (Queensland)	3–1	(Victoria (state)) VIC Blue
Taylor 5'; Hetherington 11'; Barrett 54'	Report	Ratcliffe 54'

Stadium:
State Netball and Hockey Centre

===== Third and fourth place =====
12 April 2014

ACT (Australian Capital Territory)	2–3	(Victoria (state)) VIC Blue
Cornish 9'; Apps 22'	Report	Wagg 4', 15'; Utri 11'

Stadium:
State Netball and Hockey Centre

===== Final =====
12 April 2014

NSW State (New South Wales)	2–5	(Queensland) QLD
Hayes 39'; Patterson 58'	Report	Barrett 14'; Fitzpatrick 26', 41'; Malone 36'; Boyd 69'

Stadium:
State Netball and Hockey Centre

== Awards ==
Best Player	Topscorer	Play the Whistle
(New South Wales) Grace Stewart	(Queensland) Madison Fitzpatrick	Queensland

== Statistics ==
=== Final standings ===
Pos	Team	Pld	W	D	L	GF	GA	GD	Pts	Final Result
1st place, gold medalist(s)	(Queensland) QLD	7	6	0	1	37	5	+32	18	Gold Medal
2nd place, silver medalist(s)	(New South Wales) NSW State	7	6	0	1	31	6	+25	18	Silver Medal
3rd place, bronze medalist(s)	(Victoria (state)) VIC Blue	7	3	1	3	20	14	+6	10	Bronze Medal
4	(Australian Capital Territory) ACT	7	4	0	3	17	20	−3	12	Fourth Place
5	(Western Australia) WA	7	4	1	2	15	8	+7	13	Fifth Place
6	(Tasmania) TAS	7	3	0	4	7	15	−8	9	Sixth Place
7	(New South Wales) NSW Blue	7	3	0	4	8	14	−6	9	Seventh Place
8	(Northern Territory) NT	7	2	0	5	9	15	−6	6	Eighth Place
9	(South Australia) SA	7	3	0	4	12	29	−17	9	Ninth Place
10	(Victoria (state)) VIC White	7	0	0	7	3	33	−30	0	Tenth Place

Source: Hockey Australia
