= Under 18 Australian Championships =

Annual Field Hockey tournaments held in Australia

- Sport: Field Hockey
- No. of teams: 10
- Country: Australia
- Most recent champions: Tasmania (men); Queensland (women)
- Most titles: Western Australia (3 titles) (men); Queensland (7 titles) (women)
- Website: Official website

The Under 18 Australian Championships are Field Hockey tournaments held annually in Australia. The tournament hosts ten teams from around Australia, one (or two) from each of the eight states. The event is split into men's and women's tournaments, played usually in the middle of the year.

In the 2017 edition, Pakistan U18 won the men's tournament for the first time by defeating New South Wales 3–2 in the final. Western Australia won the bronze medal by defeating Tasmania 4–2 in the third and fourth place playoff. In the women's tournament, Queensland won the tournament for the fourth time, by defeating New South Wales 2–0 in the final. Western Australia won the bronze medal by defeating Victoria 4–1 in the third and fourth playoff.

In the most recent National U18 men's Championships (2023) Tasmania defeated Queensland 5-2 in front of 2600 supporters. The win marked the first U18 national title in the state’s history. In the U18 Women’s championship, Queensland defeated Victoria in the final seconds of the match to win the national title 1-0.

== Competition format ==
The tournament is divided into two pools, Pool A and Pool B, consisting of five teams in a round robin format, with a crossover match taking place between one team from each pool at some stage in the pool stage. Teams then progress into either Pool C, the medal round, or Pool D, the classification round. Teams carry over points from their previous match ups, and contest teams they are yet to play.

The top two teams in each of pools A and B then progress to Pool C. The top two teams in Pool C continue to contest the Final, while the bottom two teams of Pool C play in the Third and Fourth place match.

The remaining bottom placing teams make up Pool D. The team play the remainder of teams they are yet to face, and final placing in pool D determines final placing overall.

== Competition rules ==
The tournament has not adapted FIH rules of four 15–minute quarters, but rather plays matches in two 35–minute halves.

=== Points System ===
Result	Points
Win	3
Draw	1
Loss	0

=== Finals Matches ===
During finals if games end in a tie, no overtime will be played and the match will go straight to a penalty shoot-out.

== Men's tournament ==
=== Results ===
- Note: The following summaries comprise results from 2014 onwards, while the tournament was founded earlier.

Year	Host	Final			Third place match
Year	Host	Winner	Score	Runner-up	Third place	Score	Fourth place
2014 Details	Canberra, ACT	Queensland	8 – 2	New South Wales	Western Australia	5 – 1	(Victoria (state)); Victoria
2015 Details	Melbourne, VIC	Western Australia	3 – 2	Tasmania	(Victoria (state)); Victoria	6 – 3	Queensland
2016 Details	Launceston, TAS	Western Australia	3 – 3 (2 – 1) (penalties)	New South Wales	(Victoria (state)); Victoria	3 – 2	Tasmania
2017 Details	Hobart, TAS	Pakistan U18	3 – 2	New South Wales	Western Australia	4 – 2	Tasmania
2023 Details	Hobart, TAS	Tasmania	5 – 2	Queensland	South Australia	1 – 0	Western Australia

=== Team Performances ===
Team	2014	2015	2016	2017	2023
(Australian Capital Territory) ACT	7th	6th	9th	9th	10th
(New South Wales) NSW 1	2nd	5th	2nd	2nd	5th
(New South Wales) NSW 2	5th	7th	5th	8th	9th
(Northern Territory) NT	9th	10th	10th	10th	12th
PAK U18	–	–	–	1st	–
(Queensland) QLD 1	1st	4th	7th	6th	2nd
(Queensland) QLD 2	–	–	8th	–	8th
(South Australia) SA	8th	8th	6th	7th	3rd
(Tasmania) TAS	6th	2nd	4th	4th	1st
(Victoria (state)) VIC 1	4th	3rd	3rd	5th	6th
(Victoria (state)) VIC 2	10th	9th	11th	–	11th
(Western Australia) WA 1	3rd	1st	1st	3rd	4th
(Western Australia) WA 2	–	–	–	–	7th
Total	10	10	11	10	12

== Women's tournament ==
=== Results ===
- Note: The following summaries comprise results from 2014 onwards, while the tournament was founded earlier.

Year	Hosts	Gold Medal Match			Third and Fourth		
Year	Hosts	Champions	Score	Runners-up	3rd place	Score	4th place
2014	Melbourne, VIC	(Queensland); QLD	5–2	(New South Wales); NSW State	(Victoria (state)); VIC Blue	3–2	(Australian Capital Territory); ACT
2015	Adelaide, SA	(Queensland); QLD	4–0	(Victoria (state)); VIC Blue	(Western Australia); WA	2–0	(New South Wales); NSW State
2016	Launceston, TAS	(Queensland); QLD 1	2–1	(New South Wales); NSW State	(Western Australia); WA	3–0	(Victoria (state)); VIC Blue
2017	Hobart, TAS	(Queensland); QLD 1	2–0	(New South Wales); NSW State	(Western Australia); WA	4–1	(Victoria (state)); VIC Blue
2018	Launceston, TAS	(New South Wales); NSW State	3–2	(Western Australia); WA	(Queensland); QLD Maroon	6–1	(Victoria (state)); VIC
2019	Hobart, TAS	(Queensland); QLD	3–2	(New South Wales); NSW Blue	(New South Wales); NSW State	5–0	(Victoria (state)); VIC

=== Team Performances ===
Team	2014	2015	2016	2017	Total
(Australian Capital Territory) ACT	4th	5th	7th	10th	4
(New South Wales) NSW 1	2nd	4th	2nd	2nd	4
(New South Wales) NSW 2	7th	8th	6th	6th	4
(Northern Territory) NT	8th	7th	10th	9th	4
(Queensland) QLD 1	1st	1st	1st	1st	4
(Queensland) QLD 2	–	–	5th	7th	2
(South Australia) SA	9th	9th	8th	8th	4
(Tasmania) TAS	6th	6th	9th	5th	4
(Victoria (state)) VIC 1	3rd	2nd	4th	4th	4
(Victoria (state)) VIC 2	10th	10th	11th	–	3
(Western Australia) WA	5th	3rd	3rd	3rd	4
Total	10	10	11	10	41
