= Anand Gupte =

Australian field hockey player

Personal information
- Full name: Anand Jacob Gupte
- Born: 4 September 1998 (age 27) Canberra, Australia
- Height: 188 cm (6 ft 2 in)

Sport
- Sport: Field hockey
- Position: Defence
Senior career
Years	Team	Caps	Goals
2019–	Canberra Chill	-	-
National team
Years	Team	Caps	Goals
2019	Australia U–21	6	(0)
2023–	Australia	8	(0)
Medal record
Men's field hockey
Representing Australia

Anand Jacob Gupte is a field hockey player from Australia.

== Personal life ==
Anand Gupte was born on 4 September 1998 in Canberra, Australian Capital Territory.

He is of Indian descent, with his father hailing from Pune.

In 2020, he completed a bachelor commerce/finance at the Australian National University.

== Career ==
=== Domestic leage ===
Gupte currently competes for the Canberra Chill in the Liberty Hockey One League, the premier domestic league run by Hockey Australia.

=== Under–21 ===
Anand Gupte made his international debut at under–21 level. He was called into the Australian junior squad, the Burras, in 2019. He made his first appearances for the squad at the Sultan of Johor Cup in Johor Bahru, where the team finished in fifth place.

=== Kookaburras ===
Following a successful domestic league in 2022, Gupte was called into the Kookaburras squad for the first time in 2023. He made his international debut during Australia's Indian leg of the third season of the FIH Pro League in Rourkela. He also went on to represent the squad during the New Zealand leg of the tournament in Christchurch.

He is currently a member of the national development squad.
