= Maddison Smith =

Australian field hockey player

Personal information
- Born: 17 March 2000 (age 26) Albion Park, New South Wales

Sport
- Sport: Field hockey
- Position: Defence
Senior career
Years	Team	Caps	Goals
2019–	NSW Pride	-	-
National team
Years	Team	Caps	Goals
2018	Australia U–18	15	(18)
2018–2020	Australia U–21	11	(0)
2023–	Australia	21	(0)
Medal record
Women's field hockey
Representing Australia
FIH Pro League
Bronze medal – third place	Season Four	Team

Maddison Smith (born 17 March 2000) is a field hockey player from Australia.

== Personal life ==
Maddison Smith was born and raised in Albion Park, New South Wales.

== Career ==
=== Domestic league ===
In Hockey Australia's domestic league, the Sultana Bran Hockey One, Smith captains the NSW Pride.

=== Under–18 ===
Smith made her junior international debut in 2018 during a qualification tournament for the Youth Olympic Games in Port Moresby. She followed this up with an appearance at the 2018 Summer Youth Olympics in Buenos Aires where she was a member of the Australian Hockey5s team that finished fifth in the girls' tournament.

=== Hockeyroos ===
In 2023, Smith made her Hockeyroos debut during season three of the FIH Pro League. She was later named in the National Development Squad.
