= Dayle Dolkens =

Australian field hockey player (born 2001)

Personal information
- Born: 28 October 2001 (age 24) Durban, South Africa, South Africa

Sport
- Sport: Field hockey
- Position: Forward
Senior career
Years	Team	Caps	Goals
2019– current	Brisbane Blaze	-	-
National team
Years	Team	Caps	Goals
2019	Australia U–21	8	(0)
2024–	Australia	5	(0)
Medal record
Women's field hockey
Representing Australia

Dayle Dolkens (born 28 October 2001) is an Australian field hockey player.

== Personal life ==
Dayle Dolkens grew up in Coomera in Gold Coast, Queensland. She studied in James Cook University in Townsville.

== Career ==
=== Domestic league ===
In Hockey Australia's domestic league, the JDH Hockey One, Dolkens is a member of the Brisbane Blaze. During the first and third season of the league, she won a gold medal. Scoring in the championship match in 2024.

=== Under–21 ===
Dolkens made her junior international debut for the Jillaroos in 2019. She represented the team during a Tri–Nations Tournament against India and New Zealand in Canberra.

=== Hockeyroos ===
Following a breakout year in 2023, Dolkens was named in the national development squad for the first time. She received her first international call-up in 2024, making her Hockeyroos debut during season five of the FIH Pro League in a match against the United States.
