= Olivia Downes =

Australian field hockey player

Personal information
- Full name: Olivia Ellena Downes
- Born: 18 December 2000 (age 25) Melbourne, Victoria

Sport
- Sport: Field hockey
- Position: Forward
Senior career
Years	Team	Caps	Goals
2022–	HC Melbourne	8	5
National team
Years	Team	Caps	Goals
2023–	Australia	0	(0)
Medal record
Women's field hockey
Representing Australia

Olivia Ellena Downes (born 18 December 2000) is a field hockey player from Australia, who plays as a forward.

== Personal life ==
Olivia Downes was born in Melbourne, Victoria, and grew up in Brighton.

== Career ==
=== Domestic leagues ===
Downes is a member of the Essendon Hockey Club in Melbourne's Premier League competition.

In Hockey Australia's national league, the Sultana Bran Hockey One League, Downes represents HC Melbourne.

=== Hockeyroos ===
Following a successful national league season, Downes was named in the national development squad for 2023. In May, she was named to make her senior international debut in a test series against India in Adelaide.
