= 2025 Women's Hockey One =

Hockey Australia's national league, fourth season

Tournament details
- Host country: Australia
- Dates: 10 October – 30 November
- Teams: 7
- Venue: 9 (in 9 host cities)

Final positions
- Champions: (Western Australia) Perth Thundersticks (2nd title)
- Runner-up: (Victoria (state)) HC Melbourne
- Third place: (New South Wales) NSW Pride

Tournament statistics
- Matches played: 25
- Goals scored: 132 (5.28 per match)
- Top scorer: (Western Australia) Madeleine Ratcliffe (10 goals)
- Best player: (South Australia) Greta Hayes

The 2025 Women's Hockey One is the fifth season of Hockey Australia's national league, Hockey One. The tournament will is being held across seven states and territories of Australia. The competition commenced on 10 October and will culminate with the finals weekend on 29–30 November at the State Netball and Hockey Centre in Melbourne.

== Competition format ==
=== Format ===
The 2025 Hockey One season followed the same format as the previous seasons of the league. Teams will play a series of home and away matches during the Pool Stage, which will be followed by a Classification Round.

During the pool stage, teams played each other once in either a home or a way fixture. The top four ranked teams qualified for the medal round, playing in two semi-finals with the winners contesting the final and losers the third place match.

=== Rules ===
In addition to FIH sanctioned rules, Hockey Australia is implementing the following rules for Hockey One:

- When a field goal or penalty stroke is scored the same athlete will have an automatic one-on-one shootout with the goalkeeper for an extra goal.
- Outright winner: There will be no drawn games. In the event of a draw, teams will contest a penalty shoot-out to determine a winner.

=== Point allocation ===
Match points will be distributed as follows:

- 5 points: win
- 3 points: shoot-out win
- 2 points: shoot-out loss
- 0 points: loss

== Participating teams ==
The seven teams competing in the league come from Australia's states and territories, with the Northern Territory being the only team absent.

(South Australia) Adelaide Fire

Head Coach: Brodie Gleeson

1. Georgina Dowd
2. Breana Catley
3. Emma Kitto
4. Chloe Holland
5. Eliza Gray
6. Laura van Marle
7. Linzi Appleyard
8. Michaela Spano
9. Caitlin Muir
10. Brittany Wang
11. Amelia Lucas
12. Greta Hayes
13. Harriet Shand (C)
14. Annelise Abbott
15. Juliet Mallinson
16. Adele Parkin
17. Lucy Sharman
18. Katie Sharkey
19. Aleisha Power (GK)
21. Amy Hammond (GK)
22. Eliza White
23. Margot van Geffen
26. Taylor Liu (GK)
27. Laura Barden
29. Eliza Pannell
(Queensland) Brisbane Blaze

Head Coach: Angela Lambert

1. Savannah Fitzpatrick
2. Kara Bradley
3. Kendra Fitzpatrick
4. Claire Colwill
6. Camryn Mathison
7. Hannah Cullum-Sanders
8. Dayle Dolkens
9. Casey Dolkens
10. Madison Fitzpatrick
11. Morgan Mathison (C)
12. Jade Smith
13. Karissa van der Wath
14. Ashleigh Ensby
15. Jade Reid
17. Bree Pendrigh
18. Madeline Kenny
19. Phoebe Nixon
20. Jamie-Lee Surha
21. Laney-Belle Smith
22. Tatum Stewart
23. Ruby Harris
24. Lily Richardson
25. Kyra Livermore
32. Emily Witheyman-Crump (GK)
88. Jordan Bliss (GK)
Canberra Chill

Head Coach: (South Africa) Marcelle Keet

1. Mikayla Evans
2. Olivia Shannon
3. Maya McGrath
4. Amy Lawton
5. Claudia Johnston
6. Josie Lawton
7. Naomi Evans
8. Olivia Martin
10. Georgina West
11. Alice Arnott
12. Taquira McGrath
14. Lucinda Nash
15. Imogen Dorsett
16. Georgie Smithers
17. Layla Riley
18. Anna Crowley
19. Hunter Baldwin
20. Ellie Baldwin
21. Mikaela Patterson
22. Laura Monterosso
24. Tess Palubski
25. Lauren Yee
27. Alyssa Smith (GK)
30. Gabrielle Millan (GK)
31. Sarah Steinhardt (GK)
(Victoria (state)) HC Melbourne

Head Coach:

1. Sophie Taylor
2. Aisling Utri
3. Mihaylia Howell
4. Rosemary Hope
5. Kristina Bates
6. Olivia Colasurdo
7. Ciara Utri
8. Hannah Cotter
9. Rosario Villagra
10. Emily Hamilton-Smith
11. Rene Hunter (GK)
13. Rebecca Greiner
14. Anna Moore
15. Olivia Downes
16. Bridget Laurance (GK)
17. Zara Geddis
19. Dacia Koelmeyer
20. Zali Ward
21. Emma Leighton (GK)
22. Charlotte Hodgson
25. Hannah Gravenall (C)
27. Trinity Woodward
29. Samantha Love
30. Bianca Zurrer
31. Evie Stansby
(New South Wales) NSW Pride

Head Coach: Scott Barker

1. Lola Dorman
2. Grace Baxter
3. Chloe Holmes
4. Teyjah Abell
5. Chelsea Holmes
6. Ella Carr
7. Grace Stewart
8. Makayla Jones
9. Amalia Patterson
10. Tegan Buchanan
11. Emma Scriven
12. Grace Jeffrey (GK)
13. Tori Adamson
14. Emmalee Croker
15. Jenna-Rae McIntyre
16. Alana Kavanagh
17. Laura Reid
18. Bella Croker
19. Jocelyn Bartram (GK)
20. Maddison Smith
21. Lily Neilson
23. Abigail Wilson
24. Mariah Williams (C)
32. Grace Young
(Western Australia) Perth Thundersticks

Head Coach: Stephanie Andrews

1. Phillipa Morgan
2. Jolie Sertorio
3. Neasa Flynn
4. Madeleine Ratcliffe
5. Courtney Schonell
6. Sarah Byrnes
7. Penny Squibb (C)
8. Madison Naish
9. Georgia Hiskins
10. Jesse Reid
11. Rachel Frusher
12. Liné Malan (C)
13. Caitlyn Templeman
14. Saysha Pillay
15. Bellé Ramshaw
16. Grace Powell
17. Annie Gibbs
18. Kaitlin Nobbs
20. Karri Somerville
21. Zoe Newman (GK)
24. Britney DeSilva
26. Lexie Pickering
27. Summer Greenway (GK)
28. Georgia Wilson
29. Camilla Vaughn (GK)
(Tasmania) Tassie Tigers

Head Coach: Alistair Addison

1. Kacee Pointing (GK)
2. Tayla Claxton
3. Phillida Bridley
4. Jemma Kenworthy
5. Zayna Jackson
6. Louisa Jacobson
7. Taylor Brooks
8. Maddison Brooks (C)
9. Lily Bushby
10. Isabelle Kruimink
11. Romani Kenworthy
12. Louise Maddock
14. Roos Swann
16. Madison Clark
17. Kathryn Lane
18. Jane Claxton
19. Stephanie Kershaw
20. Beth Dobbie
21. Renee Taylor
22. Meah Leary
23. Holly Gilbar
25. Evelyn Dalton (GK)
30. Jessica Stevens (GK)
61. Jordyn Holzberger

== Venues ==
Melbourne	Perth	Adelaide
State Netball and Hockey Centre	Perth Hockey Stadium	State Hockey Centre
Capacity: 8,000	Capacity: 6,000	Capacity: 4,000
Brisbane	2025 Women's Hockey One is located in Australia	
Queensland Hockey Centre	2025 Women's Hockey One is located in Australia	
Capacity: 1,000	2025 Women's Hockey One is located in Australia	
Canberra	2025 Women's Hockey One is located in Australia	
National Hockey Centre	2025 Women's Hockey One is located in Australia	
Goulburn	2025 Women's Hockey One is located in Australia	
Goulburn Hockey Complex	2025 Women's Hockey One is located in Australia	
Hobart	Narellan	Newcastle
Tasmanian Hockey Centre	Macarthur Regional Hockey Complex	Newcastle International Hockey Centre

== Results ==
All times are local.

=== Preliminary round ===
==== Standings ====
Pos	Team	Pld	W	WD	LD	L	GF	GA	GD	Pts	Qualification
1	(New South Wales) NSW Pride	6	5	0	0	1	25	14	+11	25	Semi-finals
2	(South Australia) Adelaide Fire	6	3	1	0	2	17	15	+2	18	Semi-finals
3	(Victoria (state)) HC Melbourne	6	3	1	0	2	15	16	−1	18	Semi-finals
4	(Western Australia) Perth Thundersticks	6	2	0	2	2	17	14	+3	14	Semi-finals
5	(Tasmania) Tassie Tigers	6	2	1	0	3	18	24	−6	13	
6	(Australian Capital Territory) Canberra Chill	6	1	1	1	3	8	13	−5	10	
7	(Queensland) Brisbane Blaze	6	0	1	2	3	9	13	−4	7	

Source: Hockey One
Rules for classification: 1) points; 2) matches won; 3) goal difference; 4) goals for; 5) head-to-head result; 6) field goals scored.

==== Fixtures ====
10 October 2025
20:15 (AEST)

Brisbane Blaze (Queensland)	1–1	(Western Australia) Perth Thundersticks
Surha 42'	Report	Schonell 31'
Penalties
Colwill (penalty shoot-out scored); Livermore (penalty shoot-out scored); Cullum-Sanders (penalty shoot-out scored)	3–1	(penalty shoot-out missed) Malan; (penalty shoot-out scored) Pickering; (penalty shoot-out missed) Ratcliffe; (penalty shoot-out missed) Nobbs

Queensland Hockey Centre, Brisbane
Umpires:
Adam Barry (AUS)
Tamara Leonard (AUS)

11 October 2025
14:00 (AEDT)

Canberra Chill	0–3	(New South Wales) NSW Pride
	Report	Wilson 9', 36'; Reid 47'

National Hockey Centre, Canberra
Umpires:
Michelle Farnill (AUS)
Sarah Willis (AUS)

12 October 2025
14:30 (AEDT)

Tassie Tigers (Tasmania)	3–4	(Victoria (state)) HC Melbourne
Kershaw 2'; Dobbie 6', 7'	Report	Cotter 18', 18'; Gravenall 53', 53'

Tasmanian Hockey Centre, Hobart
Umpires:
Harrison Winch (AUS)
Vincent Harman (AUS)

17 October 2025
18:30 (AEDT)

HC Melbourne (Victoria (state))	4–6	(South Australia) Adelaide Fire
Love 49', 49'; Howell 59', 59'	Report	Catley 9', 9'; Abbott 41'; Dowd 54', 54', 58'

State Netball and Hockey Centre, Melbourne
Umpires:
Iris Milham (AUS)
Nicola Brown (AUS)

18 October 2025
16:15 (AEDT)

NSW Pride (New South Wales)	8–5	(Tasmania) Tassie Tigers
Wilson 2', 2', 3'; McIntyre 16', 16'; Che. Holmes 42'; Jones 47', 47'	Report	Bridley 12', 12', 52'; Swann 45', 45'

Macarthur Regional Hockey Complex, Narellan
Umpires:
Kristy Robertson (AUS)
Cassidy Gallagher (AUS)

19 October 2025
16:15 (AWST)

Perth Thundersticks (Western Australia)	1–1	Canberra Chill
Gibbs 23'	Report	M. Evans 22'
Penalties
Pickering (penalty shoot-out scored); Ratcliffe (penalty shoot-out scored); Schonell (penalty shoot-out missed); Malan (penalty shoot-out missed); Somerville (penalty shoot-out scored); Pickering (penalty shoot-out missed)	3–4	(penalty shoot-out scored) Shannon; (penalty shoot-out missed) J. Lawton; (penalty shoot-out missed) A. Lawton; (penalty shoot-out scored) Shannon; (penalty shoot-out scored) Yee; (penalty shoot-out scored) Shannon

Perth Hockey Stadium, Perth
Umpires:
Nathan McDonald (AUS)
Jaxon Geddes (AUS)

24 October 2025
18:30 (AEDT)

NSW Pride (New South Wales)	3–0	(Victoria (state)) HC Melbourne
McIntyre 11'; Stewart 25'; Wilson 52'	Report

Newcastle International Hockey Centre, Newcastle
Umpires:
Michelle Farnill (AUS)
Cassidy Gallagher (AUS)

25 October 2025
16:00 (ACDT)

Adelaide Fire (South Australia)	4–2	(Western Australia) Perth Thundersticks
Dowd 12', 42', 42'; Sharman 37'	Report	Pickering 11'; Schonell 22'

State Hockey Centre, Adelaide
Umpires:
Iris Milham (AUS)
Nathan McDonald (AUS)

26 October 2025
15:15 (AEDT)

Canberra Chill	1–0	(Queensland) Brisbane Blaze
A. Lawton 4'	Report

National Hockey Centre, Canberra
Umpires:
Kristy Robertson (AUS)
Emily Carroll (AUS)

31 October 2025
18:30 (AEST)

Brisbane Blaze (Queensland)	3–4	(New South Wales) NSW Pride
S. Fitzpatrick 24'; D. Dolkens 27', 27'	Report	McIntyre 32'; Williams 41'; Kavanagh 43'; Che. Holmes 57'

Queensland Hockey Centre, Brisbane
Umpires:
Tamara Wood (AUS)
Blake Kroning (AUS)

1 November 2025
16:15 (AEDT)

Tassie Tigers (Tasmania)	3–2	(South Australia) Adelaide Fire
Swann 37', 37'; Kruimink 42'	Report	Catley 2', 2'

Tasmanian Hockey Centre, Hobart
Umpires:
Harrison Winch (AUS)
Vincent Harman (AUS)

2 November 2025
14:30 (AWST)

Perth Thundersticks (Western Australia)	1–2	(Victoria (state)) HC Melbourne
Malan 8'	Report	Cotter 29', 29'

Perth Hockey Stadium, Perth
Umpires:
Jordan Moore (AUS)
Jaxon Geddes (AUS)

7 November 2025
20:15 (AEDT)

HC Melbourne (Victoria (state))	3–1	(Queensland) Brisbane Blaze
Love 38', 38'; Cotter 48'	Report	Livermore 49'

State Netball and Hockey Centre, Melbourne
Umpires:
Nicola Brown (AUS)
Nathan McDonald (AUS)

8 November 2025
16:15 (AEDT)

Tassie Tigers (Tasmania)	1–6	(Western Australia) Perth Thundersticks
Kershaw 60+'	Report	Wilson 8', 8'; Ratcliffe 43', 43'; Nobbs 56'; Schonell 56'

Tasmanian Hockey Centre, Hobart
Umpires:
Harrison Winch (AUS)
Vincent Harman (AUS)

9 November 2025
13:00 (ACDT)

Adelaide Fire (South Australia)	3–2	Canberra Chill
Spano 9'; Hayes 35', 35'	Report	A. Lawton 51', 51'

State Hockey Centre, Adelaide
Umpires:
Nicola Brown (AUS)
Jaxon Geddes (AUS)

14 November 2025
20:15 (ACDT)

NSW Pride (New South Wales)	2–0	(South Australia) Adelaide Fire
Stewart 43', 43'	Report

Goulburn Hockey Complex, Goulburn
Umpires:
Emily Carroll (AUS)
Cassidy Gallagher (AUS)

15 November 2025
18:30 (AEDT)

HC Melbourne (Victoria (state))	2–2	Canberra Chill
Love 18'; Greiner 59'	Report	Shannon 21'; West 48'
Penalties
Greiner (penalty shoot-out missed); Love (penalty shoot-out scored); Downes (penalty shoot-out scored); Cotter (penalty shoot-out scored)	3–2	(penalty shoot-out scored) Shannon; (penalty shoot-out missed) J. Lawton; (penalty shoot-out scored) Arnott; (penalty shoot-out missed) A. Lawton; (penalty shoot-out missed) West

State Netball and Hockey Centre, Melbourne
Umpires:
Oliver Chauhan (AUS)
Nicola Brown (AUS)

16 November 2025
14:00 (AEST)

Brisbane Blaze (Queensland)	2–2	(Tasmania) Tassie Tigers
Cullum-Sanders 32'; S. Fitzpatrick 56'	Report	M. Brooks 60', 60'
Penalties
K. Fitzpatrick (penalty shoot-out missed); Livermore (penalty shoot-out missed); Colwill (penalty shoot-out missed); C. Dolkens (penalty shoot-out missed)	0–2	(penalty shoot-out missed) M. Brooks; (penalty shoot-out scored) Kershaw; (penalty shoot-out scored) Bridley

Queensland Hockey Centre, Brisbane
Umpires:
Aleisha Neumann (AUS)
Melanie Blanchard

21 November 2025
18:30 (AEDT)

Canberra Chill	2–4	(Tasmania) Tassie Tigers
Nash 16'; M. Evans 21'	Report	T. Claxton 4', 4'; Bridley 45', 45'

National Hockey Centre, Canberra
Umpires:
Emily Carroll (AUS)
Kristy Robertson (AUS)

22 November 2025
16:00 (ACDT)

Adelaide Fire (South Australia)	2–2	(Queensland) Brisbane Blaze
Spano 36', 36'	Report	Harris 3', 3'
Penalties
Catley (penalty shoot-out scored); Hayes (penalty shoot-out scored); Van Geffen (penalty shoot-out missed); Barden (penalty shoot-out scored)	3–2	(penalty shoot-out missed) Mathison; (penalty shoot-out missed) D. Dolkens; (penalty shoot-out scored) Colwill; (penalty shoot-out scored) Cullum-Sanders; (penalty shoot-out missed) Livermore

State Hockey Centre, Adelaide
Umpires:
Iris Milham (AUS)
Nathan McDonald (AUS)

23 November 2025
16:15 (AWST)

Perth Thundersticks (Western Australia)	6–5	(New South Wales) NSW Pride
Ratcliffe 5', 6', 11', 39', 39', 57'	Report	Che. Holmes 6'; Stewart 8'; Kavanagh 23'; Young 35', 35'

Perth Hockey Stadium, Perth
Umpires:
Harrison Winch (AUS)
Jaxon Geddes (AUS)

=== Medal round ===
==== Bracket ====
Semi-finals
29 November
(New South Wales) NSW Pride	0
(Western Australia) Perth Thundersticks	6
29 November
(South Australia) Adelaide Fire	2
(Victoria (state)) HC Melbourne	4

Final
30 November
(Western Australia) Perth Thundersticks	4
(Victoria (state)) HC Melbourne	2
Third place
30 November
(New South Wales) NSW Pride	3
(South Australia) Adelaide Fire	2

==== Semi-finals ====
29 November 2025
11:00

NSW Pride (New South Wales)	0–6	(Western Australia) Perth Thundersticks
	Report	Pickering 6', 35', 35'; Flynn 25', 25'; Schonell 37'

State Netball and Hockey Centre, Melbourne
Umpires:
Jayden Pearson (AUS)
Iris Milham (AUS)

29 November 2025
14:30

Adelaide Fire (South Australia)	2–4	(Victoria (state)) HC Melbourne
Barden 43', 43'	Report	Ward 19'; Taylor 30'; Cotter 34'; A. Utri 55'

State Netball and Hockey Centre, Melbourne
Umpires:
Kristy Robertson (AUS)
Cassidy Gallagher (AUS)

==== Third and fourth place ====
30 November 2025
11:30

NSW Pride (New South Wales)	3–2	(South Australia) Adelaide Fire
Smith 42'; Williams 60', 60'	Report	Dowd 29', 29'

State Netball and Hockey Centre, Melbourne
Umpires:
Cassidy Gallagher (AUS)
Iris Milham (AUS)

==== Final ====
30 November 2025
15:30

Perth Thundersticks (Western Australia)	4–2	(Victoria (state)) HC Melbourne
Ratcliffe 20', 20'; Malan 58', 58'	Report	A. Utri 55', 55'

State Netball and Hockey Centre, Melbourne
Umpires:
Jayden Pearson (AUS)
Kristy Robertson (AUS)

== Final standings ==
Pos	Team	Pld	W	WD	LD	L	GF	GA	GD	Pts	Final standing
1st place, gold medalist(s)	(Western Australia) Perth Thundersticks	8	4	0	2	2	27	16	+11	24	Gold Medal
2nd place, silver medalist(s)	(Victoria (state)) HC Melbourne	8	4	1	0	3	21	22	−1	23	Silver Medal
3rd place, bronze medalist(s)	(New South Wales) NSW Pride	8	6	0	0	2	28	22	+6	30	Bronze Medal
4	(South Australia) Adelaide Fire	8	3	1	0	4	21	22	−1	18	Fourth Place
5	(Tasmania) Tassie Tigers	6	2	1	0	3	18	24	−6	13	Eliminated in Group Stage
6	(Australian Capital Territory) Canberra Chill	6	1	1	1	3	8	13	−5	10	Eliminated in Group Stage
7	(Queensland) Brisbane Blaze	6	0	1	2	3	9	13	−4	7	Eliminated in Group Stage

Source: Hockey Australia

== Team of the Year ==
At the conclusion of the regular season, a team of the year was named:

2025 Women's Team of the Year
Goalkeeper	Defenders	Midfielders	Forwards	Substitutes
Aleisha Power (Fire)	Laura Barden (Fire); Alana Kavanagh (Pride); Casey Dolkens (Blaze); Georgie Smithers (Chill)	Samantha Love (Melbourne); Grace Young (Pride); Amy Lawton (Chill); Greta Hayes (Fire)	Grace Stewart (Pride); Hannah Cotter (Melbourne)	Madeleine Ratcliffe (Thundersticks); Mariah Williams (Pride); Olivia Downes (Melbourne); Claire Colwill (Blaze); Georgina West (Chill); Bridget Laurance (Melbourne)

== Goalscorers ==
There were 132 goals scored in 25 matches, for an average of 5.28 goals per match.

10 goals

- (Western Australia) Madeleine Ratcliffe

8 goals

- (South Australia) Georgina Dowd

6 goals

- (Victoria (state)) Hannah Cotter
- (New South Wales) Abigail Wilson

5 goals

- (Victoria (state)) Samantha Love
- (Tasmania) Phillida Bridley

4 goals

- (South Australia) Breana Catley
- (New South Wales) Jenna-Rae McIntyre
- (New South Wales) Grace Stewart
- (Western Australia) Lexie Pickering
- (Western Australia) Courtney Schonell
- (Tasmania) Roos Swann

3 goals

- (South Australia) Michaela Spano
- (Australian Capital Territory) Amy Lawton
- (Victoria (state)) Aisling Utri
- (New South Wales) Chelsea Holmes
- (New South Wales) Mariah Williams
- (Western Australia) Liné Malan

2 goals

- (South Australia) Laura Barden
- (South Australia) Greta Hayes
- (Queensland) Dayle Dolkens
- (Queensland) Savannah Fitzpatrick
- (Queensland) Ruby Harris
- (Australian Capital Territory) Mikayla Evans
- (Victoria (state)) Hannah Gravenall
- (Victoria (state)) Mihaylia Howell
- (New South Wales) Makayla Jones
- (New South Wales) Alana Kavanagh
- (New South Wales) Grace Young
- (Western Australia) Neasa Flynn
- (Western Australia) Georgia Wilson
- (Tasmania) Maddison Brooks
- (Tasmania) Tayla Claxton
- (Tasmania) Beth Dobbie
- (Tasmania) Stephanie Kershaw

1 goal

- (South Australia) Annalise Abbott
- (South Australia) Lucy Sharman
- (Queensland) Hannah Cullum-Sanders
- (Queensland) Kyra Livermore
- (Queensland) Jamie-Lee Surha
- (Australian Capital Territory) Lucinda Nash
- (Australian Capital Territory) Olivia Shannon
- (Australian Capital Territory) Georgina West
- (Victoria (state)) Rebecca Greiner
- (Victoria (state)) Sophie Taylor
- (Victoria (state)) Zali Ward
- (New South Wales) Laura Reid
- (New South Wales) Maddison Smith
- (Western Australia) Annie Gibbs
- (Western Australia) Kaitlin Nobbs
- (Tasmania) Isabelle Kruimink

Source: Hockey Australia
