= 2022 Women's Hockey One =

Hockey Australia's national league, second season

2022 Women's Sultana Bran Hockey One
Tournament details
- Host country: Australia
- Dates: 29 September – 20 November
- Teams: 7
- Venue: 9 (in 9 host cities)

Final positions
- Champions: (New South Wales) NSW Pride (1st title)
- Runner-up: (Queensland) Brisbane Blaze
- Third place: (Western Australia) Perth Thundersticks

Tournament statistics
- Matches played: 25
- Goals scored: 99 (3.96 per match)
- Top scorer: (New South Wales) Grace Stewart (9 goals)
- Best player: (Victoria (state)) Amy Lawton

The 2022 Women's Sultana Bran Hockey One was the second season of Hockey Australia's national league, Hockey One. The tournament was held across 7 states and territories of Australia. Competition commenced on 29 September, and culminated with a finals weekend running from 19 to 20 November, held in Bendigo, Victoria.

NSW Pride won the tournament for the first time, defeating the Brisbane Blaze 3–1 in penalties after the final finished as a 2–2 draw. Perth Thundersticks claimed third place after defeating HC Melbourne 3–0.

== Competition format ==
=== Format ===
The 2022 Hockey One season followed the same format as season one. Teams will play a series of home and away matches during the Pool Stage, which will be followed by a Classification Round.

During the pool stage, teams played each other once in either a home or a way fixture. The top four ranked teams qualified for the classification round, playing in two semi-finals with the winners contesting the final and losers the third place match. Unlike season one, where Team 1 hosted Team 4 and Team 2 hosted Team 3, the finals were held over a single weekend at a central location.

=== Rules ===
In addition to FIH sanctioned rules, Hockey Australia is implementing the following rules for Hockey One:

- When a field goal or penalty stroke is scored the same athlete will have an automatic one-on-one shootout with the goalkeeper for an extra goal.
- Outright winner: There will be no drawn games. In the event of a draw, teams will contest a penalty shoot-out to determine a winner.

=== Point allocation ===
Match points will be distributed as follows:

- 5 points: win
- 3 points: shoot-out win
- 2 points: shoot-out loss
- 0 points: loss

== Participating teams ==
The seven teams competing in the league come from Australia's states and territories, with the Northern Territory being the only team absent.

(South Australia) Adelaide Fire

Head Coach: Jason Butcher

1. Linzi Appleyard
4. Chloe Carter
5. Kelsey Bing (GK)
7. Kate Holland-Smith
8. Holly Evans-Gill (C)
9. Lucy Holland-Smith
10. Carly Hoffman
11. Lucy Sharman
13. Sarah Harrison
15. Jane Claxton
16. Juliet Mallinson
17. Siennah Cowles
18. Erin Cameron
19. Gabrielle Nance
20. Harriet Shand
21. Michaela Spano
23. Isabella Gill
24. Kirra-Lee Pavy
28. Amy Hammond (GK)
30. Julia King
(Queensland) Brisbane Blaze

Head Coach: Nikki Taylor

1. Savannah Fitzpatrick
2. Ambrosia Malone
3. Casey Dolkens
4. Ashlea Fey
5. Dayle Dolkens
6. Morgan Gallagher (C)
7. Hannah Cullum-Sanders
8. Laney Smith
11. Jade Smith
12. Tatum Stewart
13. Rebecca Greiner
14. Meg Pearce
19. Morgan Mathison
19. Britt Wilkinson
20. Ruby Harris
21. Claire Colwill
22. Kyra Livermore
30. Georgina West
32. Emily Witheyman-Crump (GK)
88. Jordan Bliss (GK)
(Australian Capital Territory) Canberra Chill

Head Coach:

1. Mikayla Evans
2. Isabelle Lovel
4. Madison Doar
6. Katie Doar
7. Naomi Evans
8. Laura Gray
11. Sophie Gaughan
13. Edwina Bone (C)
14. Emily Robson
15. Asta Johnson (GK)
16. Shihori Oikawa
18. Olivia Martin
19. Riley Smith
20. Stephanie Kindon
21. Mikaela Patterson
23. Kalindi Commerford
24. Sarah White
25. Lauren Yee
28. Catriona Bailey-Price
32. Rene Hunter (GK)
(Victoria (state)) HC Melbourne

Head Coach: Phil Burrows

1. Bridget Laurance (GK)
2. Aisling Utri
3. Nicola Hammond
4. Amy Lawton
5. Kristina Bates
6. Josie Lawton
7. Ciara Utri
8. Hannah Cotter
9. Carly James
10. Rosario Villagra
11. Joanne Peeters
12. Emily Hamilton-Smith
13. Megan Alakus
14. Anna Moore
15. Olivia Downes
16. Gracie Geddes
20. Zali Ward
22. Madeleine Ratcliffe
25. Hannah Gravenall (C)
27. Rachael Lynch (GK)
(New South Wales) NSW Pride

Head Coach: Peter Shea

1. Jocelyn Bartram (GK)
2. Sarah Johnson
3. Hannah Kable
4. Kendelle Tait
6. Estelle Hughes
7. Grace Stewart
10. Greta Hayes
11. Emma Scriven
13. Tamsin Bunt
19. Morgan Blamey
20. Maddison Smith (C)
21. Julia Bradley
22. Zoe Newman (GK)
23. Abigail Wilson
24. Mariah Williams
30. Makayla Jones
31. Emma Spinks
32. Grace Young
33. Alice Arnott
51. Alana Kavanagh
(Western Australia) Perth Thundersticks

Head Coach: Phillip Hulbert

1. Kate Denning
2. Kyra White (C)
3. Candyce Peacock
5. Georgina Dowd
7. Penny Squibb
8. Georgia Wilson
9. Shanea Tonkin
10. Sarah Byrnes
11. Rachel Frusher
12. Liné Malan
13. Neasa Flynn
14. Elizabeth Duguid (GK)
16. Karri Somerville
17. Annie Gibbs
18. Renee Rockliff
19. Aleisha Power (GK)
21. Jade van der Zwan
22. Anna Roberts
24. Brittney Desilva
25. Jolie Sertorio
(Tasmania) Tassie Tigers

Head Coach: Luke Doerner

1. Sarah McCambridge (C)
2. Jillian Wolgemuth
3. Hannah Richardson
4. Maddison Brooks
5. Taylor Brooks
6. Raeleigh Phillips
7. Madeleine Murphy (C)
8. Cassie Sumfest
9. Emily Donovan
10. Kiah Williams
11. Eliza Westland
12. Louise Maddocks
14. Brooke DeBerdine
15. Lucy Cooper
16. Madison Clark
17. Grace Calvert
20. Beth Dobbie
21. Lauren Canning
23. Camila Vaughan (GK)
25. Evelyn Dalton (GK)

== Venues ==
| Sydney | Melbourne | Perth |
|---|---|---|
| Sydney Olympic Park | State Netball and Hockey Centre | Perth Hockey Stadium |
| Capacity: 8,000 | Capacity: 8,000 | Capacity: 6,000 |
| Adelaide | 2022 Women's Hockey One is located in Australia | |
| State Hockey Centre | 2022 Women's Hockey One is located in Australia | |
| Capacity: 4,000 | 2022 Women's Hockey One is located in Australia | |
| Brisbane | 2022 Women's Hockey One is located in Australia | |
| Queensland State Hockey Centre | 2022 Women's Hockey One is located in Australia | |
| Capacity: 1,000 | 2022 Women's Hockey One is located in Australia | |
| Bendigo | 2022 Women's Hockey One is located in Australia | |
| Bendigo Regional Hockey Complex | 2022 Women's Hockey One is located in Australia | |
| Canberra | Hobart | Parkes |
| National Hockey Centre | Tasmanian Hockey Centre | McGlynn Sporting Complex |

== Results ==
=== Preliminary round ===
| Pos | Team | Pld | W | WD | LD | L | GF | GA | GD | Pts | Qualification |
|---|---|---|---|---|---|---|---|---|---|---|---|
| 1 | (Victoria (state)) HC Melbourne | 6 | 5 | 0 | 0 | 1 | 23 | 10 | +13 | 25 | Semi-finals |
| 2 | (New South Wales) NSW Pride | 6 | 4 | 0 | 0 | 2 | 22 | 11 | +11 | 20 | Semi-finals |
| 3 | (Western Australia) Perth Thundersticks | 6 | 4 | 0 | 0 | 2 | 11 | 7 | +4 | 20 | Semi-finals |
| 4 | (Queensland) Brisbane Blaze | 6 | 3 | 0 | 1 | 2 | 14 | 9 | +5 | 17 | Semi-finals |
| 5 | (Australian Capital Territory) Canberra Chill | 6 | 3 | 0 | 0 | 3 | 9 | 13 | −4 | 15 | |
| 6 | (South Australia) Adelaide Fire | 6 | 1 | 0 | 0 | 5 | 6 | 15 | −9 | 5 | |
| 7 | (Tasmania) Tassie Tigers | 6 | 0 | 1 | 0 | 5 | 5 | 25 | −20 | 3 | |

Source: Hockey Australia
Rules for classification: 1) points; 2) matches won; 3) goal difference; 4) goals for; 5) head-to-head result; 6) field goals scored.

==== Fixtures ====
29 September 2022
18:30 (AEST)

| HC Melbourne (Victoria (state)) | 5–3 | (New South Wales) NSW Pride |
|---|---|---|
| A. Utri 18'; Villagra 30'; Cotter 38', 38'; Downes 38' | Report | Stewart 41', 41'; Williams 43' |

Melbourne Sports Centre, Melbourne
Umpires:
Rhiannon Murrie (AUS)
Nicola Brown (AUS)

30 September 2022
18:30 (AEST)

| Tassie Tigers (Tasmania) | 2–2 | (Queensland) Brisbane Blaze |
|---|---|---|
| M. Brooks 37', 37' | Report | Fitzpatrick 48'; Malone 55' |
Penalties
| M. Brooks (penalty shoot-out missed); Murphy (penalty shoot-out scored); Sumfest (penalty shoot-out scored); DeBerdine (penalty shoot-out scored) | 3–1 | (penalty shoot-out scored) Cullum-Sanders; (penalty shoot-out missed) Malone; (penalty shoot-out missed) Fitzpatrick; (penalty shoot-out missed) Wilkinson |

Tasmanian Hockey Centre, Hobart
Umpires:
Cassidy Gallagher (AUS)
Rhiannon Murrie (AUS)

1 October 2022
17:30 (AWST)

| Perth Thundersticks (Western Australia) | 3–1 | (South Australia) Adelaide Fire |
|---|---|---|
| Somerville 21'; Malan 34', 34' | Report | Appleyard 44' |

Perth Hockey Stadium, Perth
Umpires:
Iris Milham (AUS)
Aleisha Neumann (AUS)

6 October 2022
17:30 (AEST)

| Brisbane Blaze (Queensland) | 2–4 | (Australian Capital Territory) Canberra Chill |
|---|---|---|
| J. Smith 58', 58' | Report | K. Doar 6', 6'; Patterson 50', 50' |

Queensland State Hockey Centre, Brisbane
Umpires:
Tamara Leonard (AUS)
Aleisha Neumann (AUS)

7 October 2022
18:30 (AEDT)

| HC Melbourne (Victoria (state)) | 0–2 | (Western Australia) Perth Thundersticks |
|---|---|---|
| | Report | Wilson 52'; Malan 57' |

Melbourne Sports Centre, Melbourne
Umpires:
Nicola Brown (AUS)
Iris Milham (AUS)

8 October 2022
19:00 (ACDT)

| Adelaide Fire (South Australia) | 2–0 | (Tasmania) Tassie Tigers |
|---|---|---|
| Carter 2', 3' | Report |

MATE Stadium, Adelaide
Umpires:
Kristy Robertson (AUS)
Cassidy Gallagher (AUS)

13 October 2022
20:00 (AEDT)

| Canberra Chill (Australian Capital Territory) | 0–2 | (Victoria (state)) HC Melbourne |
|---|---|---|
| | Report | A. Lawton 30'; Cotter 45' |

National Hockey Centre, Canberra
Umpires:
Emily Carroll (AUS)
Kristy Robertson (AUS)

14 October 2022
18:00 (ACDT)

| Adelaide Fire (South Australia) | 2–5 | (New South Wales) NSW Pride |
|---|---|---|
| Claxton 40', 40' | Report | Stewart 7', 26', 26'; Jones 14'; Wilson 33' |

MATE Stadium, Adelaide
Umpires:
Michelle Farnill (AUS)
Rhiannon Murrie (AUS)

15 October 2022
18:00 (AWST)

| Perth Thundersticks (Western Australia) | 0–3 | (Queensland) Brisbane Blaze |
|---|---|---|
| | Report | Stewart 15', 60'; Cullum-Sanders 52' |

Perth Hockey Stadium, Perth
Umpires:
Nicola Brown (AUS)
Aleisha Neumann (AUS)

20 October 2022
20:00 (AEDT)

| Tassie Tigers (Tasmania) | 0–3 | (Australian Capital Territory) Canberra Chill |
|---|---|---|
| | Report | Kindon 23'; Oikawa 42'; M. Doar 42' |

Tasmanian Hockey Centre, Hobart
Umpires:
Rhiannon Murrie (AUS)
Nicola Brown (AUS)

21 October 2022
20:00 (AEDT)

| NSW Pride (New South Wales) | 2–0 | (Western Australia) Perth Thundersticks |
|---|---|---|
| M. Smith 21', 21' | Report |

Sydney Olympic Park, Sydney
Umpires:
Cassidy Gallagher (AUS)
Michelle Farnill (AUS)

22 October 2022
20:00 (AEST)

| Brisbane Blaze (Queensland) | 1–2 | (Victoria (state)) HC Melbourne |
|---|---|---|
| Stewart 49' | Report | Cotter 12'; J. Lawton 53' |

Queensland State Hockey Centre, Brisbane
Umpires:
Aleisha Neumann (AUS)
Deborah O'Connell (AUS)

27 October 2022
18:30 (AEDT)

| Canberra Chill (Australian Capital Territory) | 1–0 | (South Australia) Adelaide Fire |
|---|---|---|
| Reid 34' | Report |

National Hockey Centre, Canberra
Umpires:
Kristy Robertson (AUS)
Emily Carroll (AUS)

28 October 2022
18:30 (AEDT)

| NSW Pride (New South Wales) | 1–4 | (Queensland) Brisbane Blaze |
|---|---|---|
| Stewart 22' | Report | Cullum-Sanders 6', 6'; Fitzpatrick 13', 13' |

Sydney Olympic Park, Sydney
Umpires:
Michelle Farnill (AUS)
Kerryl Brown (AUS)

29 October 2022
16:30 (AWST)

| Perth Thundersticks (Western Australia) | 3–0 | (Tasmania) Tassie Tigers |
|---|---|---|
| Wilson 19', 19'; Tonkin 42' | Report |

Perth Hockey Stadium, Perth
Umpires:
Tamara Leonard (AUS)
Nicola Brown (AUS)

3 November 2022
18:00 (ACDT)

| Adelaide Fire (South Australia) | 1–4 | (Victoria (state)) HC Melbourne |
|---|---|---|
| Mallinson 14' | Report | Bates 24'; A. Lawton 54'; Cotter 57', 57' |

MATE Stadium, Adelaide
Umpires:
Kerryl Brown (AUS)
Deborah O'Connell (AUS)

4 November 2022
18:30 (AEDT)

| Tassie Tigers (Tasmania) | 0–5 | (New South Wales) NSW Pride |
|---|---|---|
| | Report | Wilson 23'; Arnott 26'; Blamey 40'; Jones 43', 43' |

Tasmanian Hockey Centre, Hobart
Umpires:
Rhiannon Murrie (AUS)
Cassidy Gallagher (AUS)

5 November 2022
15:30 (AEDT)

| Canberra Chill (Australian Capital Territory) | 1–3 | (Western Australia) Perth Thundersticks |
|---|---|---|
| Commerford 24' | Report | Dowd 1', 2'; Squibb 6' |

National Hockey Centre, Canberra
Umpires:
Kristy Robertson (AUS)
Emily Carroll (AUS)

10 November 2022
18:30 (AEDT)

| HC Melbourne (Victoria (state)) | 10–3 | (Tasmania) Tassie Tigers |
|---|---|---|
| Ratcliffe 1', 1', 25', 42'; Downes 23', 23', 29', 29'; Peeters 38', 38' | Report | Cooper 29', 29'; M. Brooks 60' |

Melbourne Sports Centre, Melbourne
Umpires:
Iris Milham (AUS)
Nicola Brown (AUS)

11 November 2022
17:30 (AEST)

| Brisbane Blaze (Queensland) | 2–0 | (South Australia) Adelaide Fire |
|---|---|---|
| Stewart 28'; Cullum-Sanders 36' | Report |

Queensland State Hockey Centre, Brisbane
Umpires:
Kerryl Brown (AUS)
Tamara Leonard (AUS)

12 November 2022
17:00 (AEDT)

| NSW Pride (New South Wales) | 6–0 | (Australian Capital Territory) Canberra Chill |
|---|---|---|
| Stewart 4', 29'; Blamey 11'; Arnott 41', 51', 51' | Report |

McGlynn Sporting Complex, Parkes
Umpires:
Kristy Robertson (AUS)
Cassidy Gallagher (AUS)

=== Classification round ===
Semi-finals
19 November 2022
(Victoria (state)) HC Melbourne | 0
(Queensland) Brisbane Blaze | 1
19 November 2022
(New South Wales) NSW Pride | 1
(Western Australia) Perth Thundersticks | 0

Grand Final
20 November 2022
(Queensland) Brisbane Blaze | 2 (1)
(New South Wales) NSW Pride (pen.) | 2 (3)
Third place
20 November 2022
(Victoria (state)) HC Melbourne | 0
(Western Australia) Perth Thundersticks | 3

==== Semi-finals ====
19 November 2022
10:35

| NSW Pride (New South Wales) | 1–0 | (Western Australia) Perth Thundersticks |
|---|---|---|
| Wilson 41' | Report |

Bendigo Regional Hockey Complex, Bendigo
Umpires:
Nicola Brown (AUS)
Tamara Leonard (AUS)

19 November 2022
13:35

| HC Melbourne (Victoria (state)) | 0–1 | (Queensland) Brisbane Blaze |
|---|---|---|
| | Report | Malone 28' |

Bendigo Regional Hockey Complex, Bendigo
Umpires:
Aleisha Neumann (AUS)
Kristy Robertson (AUS)

==== Third and fourth place ====
20 November 2022
10:35

| HC Melbourne (Victoria (state)) | 0–3 | (Western Australia) Perth Thundersticks |
|---|---|---|
| | Report | Squibb 3'; Dowd 3'; Somerville 25' |

Bendigo Regional Hockey Complex, Bendigo
Umpires:
Nicola Brown (AUS)
Tamara Leonard (AUS)

==== Final ====
20 November 2022
14:15

| Brisbane Blaze (Queensland) | 2–2 | (New South Wales) NSW Pride |
|---|---|---|
| Fitzpatrick 27', 27' | Report | Wilson 24'; Stewart 33' |
Penalties
| Colwill (penalty shoot-out missed); Malone (penalty shoot-out missed); Cullum-Sanders (penalty shoot-out missed); Fitzpatrick (penalty shoot-out scored) | 1–3 | (penalty shoot-out missed) Jones; (penalty shoot-out scored) Stewart; (penalty shoot-out scored) Williams; (penalty shoot-out scored) Hayes |

Bendigo Regional Hockey Complex, Bendigo
Umpires:
Aleisha Neumann (AUS)
Kristy Robertson (AUS)

== Awards ==
| Top Goalscorer(s) | Player of the League | Player of the Final |
|---|---|---|
| (New South Wales) Grace Stewart | (Victoria (state)) Amy Lawton | (New South Wales) Mariah Williams |

== Final standings ==
| Pos | Team | Pld | W | WD | LD | L | GF | GA | GD | Pts | Final standing |
|---|---|---|---|---|---|---|---|---|---|---|---|
| 1st place, gold medalist(s) | (New South Wales) NSW Pride | 8 | 5 | 1 | 0 | 2 | 25 | 13 | +12 | 28 | Gold Medal |
| 2nd place, silver medalist(s) | (Queensland) Brisbane Blaze | 8 | 4 | 0 | 2 | 2 | 17 | 11 | +6 | 24 | Silver Medal |
| 3rd place, bronze medalist(s) | (Western Australia) Perth Thundersticks | 8 | 5 | 0 | 0 | 3 | 14 | 8 | +6 | 25 | Bronze Medal |
| 4 | (Victoria (state)) HC Melbourne | 8 | 5 | 0 | 0 | 3 | 23 | 14 | +9 | 25 | Fourth Place |
| 5 | (Australian Capital Territory) Canberra Chill | 6 | 3 | 0 | 0 | 3 | 9 | 13 | −4 | 15 | Eliminated in Group Stage |
| 6 | (South Australia) Adelaide Fire | 6 | 1 | 0 | 0 | 5 | 6 | 15 | −9 | 5 | Eliminated in Group Stage |
| 7 | (Tasmania) Tassie Tigers | 6 | 0 | 1 | 0 | 5 | 5 | 25 | −20 | 3 | Eliminated in Group Stage |

Source: Hockey Australia

== Goalscorers ==
There were 99 goals scored in 25 matches, for an average of 3.96 goals per match.

9 goals

- (New South Wales) Grace Stewart

6 goals

- (Victoria (state)) Hannah Cotter

5 goals

- (Queensland) Savannah Fitzpatrick
- (Victoria (state)) Olivia Downes

4 goals

- (Queensland) Hannah Cullum-Sanders
- (Queensland) Tatum Stewart
- (Victoria (state)) Madeleine Ratcliffe
- (New South Wales) Alice Arnott
- (New South Wales) Abigail Wilson

3 goals

- (New South Wales) Makayla Jones
- (Western Australia) Georgina Dowd
- (Western Australia) Liné Malan
- (Western Australia) Georgia Wilson
- (Tasmania) Maddison Brooks

2 goals

- (South Australia) Chloe Carter
- (South Australia) Jane Claxton
- (Queensland) Ambrosia Malone
- (Queensland) Jade Smith
- (Australian Capital Territory) Katie Doar
- (Australian Capital Territory) Mikaela Patterson
- (Victoria (state)) Amy Lawton
- (Victoria (state)) Joanne Peeters
- (New South Wales) Morgan Blamey
- (New South Wales) Maddison Smith
- (Western Australia) Karri Somerville
- (Western Australia) Penny Squibb
- (Tasmania) Lucy Cooper

1 goal

- (South Australia) Linzi Appleyard
- (South Australia) Juliet Mallinson
- (Australian Capital Territory) Kalindi Commerford
- (Australian Capital Territory) Madison Doar
- (Australian Capital Territory) Stephanie Kindon
- (Australian Capital Territory) Shihori Oikawa
- (Australian Capital Territory) Laura Reid
- (Victoria (state)) Kristina Bates
- (Victoria (state)) Josie Lawton
- (Victoria (state)) Aisling Utri
- (Victoria (state)) Rosario Villagra
- (New South Wales) Mariah Williams
- (Western Australia) Shanea Tonkin

Source: Hockey Australia
