= 2023 Women's Hockey One =

Hockey Australia's national league, third season

2023 Women's JDH Hockey One
Tournament details
- Host country: Australia
- Dates: 6 October – 26 November
- Teams: 7
- Venue: 7 (in 7 host cities)

Final positions
- Champions: (Queensland) Brisbane Blaze (2nd title)
- Runner-up: (Australian Capital Territory) Canberra Chill
- Third place: (Western Australia) Perth Thundersticks

Tournament statistics
- Matches played: 25
- Goals scored: 114 (4.56 per match)
- Top scorer: (Queensland) Savannah Fitzpatrick (7 goals)
- Best player: (New South Wales) Kaitlin Nobbs

The 2023 Women's JDH Hockey One was the third season of Hockey Australia's national league, Hockey One. The tournament was held across 7 states and territories of Australia. Competition commenced on 6 October, and culminated with a finals weekend on 25 and 26 November.

== Competition format ==
=== Format ===
The 2023 Hockey One season followed the same format as seasons one and two. Teams will play a series of home and away matches during the Pool Stage, which will be followed by a Classification Round.

During the pool stage, teams played each other once in either a home or a way fixture. The top four ranked teams qualified for the classification round, playing in two semi-finals with the winners contesting the final and losers the third place match. Unlike season one, where Team 1 hosted Team 4 and Team 2 hosted Team 3, the finals were held over a single weekend at a central location.

=== Rules ===
In addition to FIH sanctioned rules, Hockey Australia is implementing the following rules for Hockey One:

- When a field goal or penalty stroke is scored the same athlete will have an automatic one-on-one shootout with the goalkeeper for an extra goal.
- Outright winner: There will be no drawn games. In the event of a draw, teams will contest a penalty shoot-out to determine a winner.

=== Point allocation ===
Match points will be distributed as follows:

- 5 points: win
- 3 points: shoot-out win
- 2 points: shoot-out loss
- 0 points: loss

== Participating teams ==
The seven teams competing in the league come from Australia's states and territories, with the Northern Territory being the only team absent.

(South Australia) Adelaide Fire

Head Coach: Hugh Purvis

1. Chloe Carter
2. Brittany Wang
3. Gabriella Mitreska
4. Harriet Shand
5. Holly Evans-Gill
6. Euleena MacLachlan
7. Ella du Preez
8. Michaela Spano
9. Marjolein Ceulen
10. Carly Hoffman
11. Lucy Sharman
12. Erin Cameron
13. Chloe Holland
14. Asta Fisher
15. Brooke Peris
17. Katie Sharkey
18. Anna Crowley
21. Amy Hammond (GK)
22. Zoe Newman (GK)
25. Jane Claxton
26. Linzi Appleyard
27. Sherilyn Cass
(Queensland) Brisbane Blaze

Head Coach: Nikki Taylor

1. Savannah Fitzpatrick
2. Ambrosia Malone
3. Kendra Fitzpatrick
4. Claire Colwill
5. Morgan Gallagher
6. Hannah Cullum-Sanders
7. Jodie Kenny
8. Dayle Dolkens
9. Casey Dolkens
10. Madison Fitzpatrick
11. Morgan Mathison
12. Tatum Stewart
13. Rebecca Greiner
14. Stephanie Kershaw
15. Jade Reid
16. Keeley Walker
21. Emily Kingston (GK)
22. Britt Wilkinson
23. Ruby Harris
25. Kyra Livermore
30. Georgina West
88. Jordan Bliss (GK)
(Australian Capital Territory) Canberra Chill

Head Coach: Matt Cook

1. Mikayla Evans
2. Kathryn Mullan
4. Emma Baxter
5. Claudia Johnston
6. Róisín Upton
7. Naomi Evans
8. Sarah Hawkshaw
9. Samantha Economos
11. Tamsin Bunt
13. Edwina Bone
14. Emily Robson
15. Zanthe Sheargold
16. Georgie Smithers
17. Kaitlin Cotter
18. Olivia Martin
21. Mikaela Patterson
23. Kalindi Commerford
24. Sarah White
25. Lauren Yee
29. Madeline Dooley
31. Sarah Steinhardt
32. Rene Hunter (GK)
(Victoria (state)) HC Melbourne

Head Coach: Daniel Mitchell

1. Bridget Laurance (GK)
2. Aisling Utri
3. Nicola Hammond
4. Amy Lawton
5. Kristina Bates
6. Josie Lawton
7. Ciara Utri
8. Jessie Dean
9. Carly James
10. Rosario Villagra
11. Joanne Peeters
12. Emily Hamilton-Smith
13. Megan Alakus
14. Laura Barden
15. Olivia Downes
16. Gracie Geddis
18. Amelie Green
20. Zali Ward
22. Charlotte Hodgson
23. Samantha Snow
25. Hannah Gravenall
27. Rachael Lynch (GK)
(New South Wales) NSW Pride

Head Coach:Scott Barker

1. Jocelyn Bartram (GK)
3. Hannah Kable
4. Kendelle Tait
6. Estelle Hughes
7. Grace Stewart
8. Alana Kavanagh
10. Greta Hayes
12. Ellie Baldwin
13. Ella Carr
17. Laura Reid
18. Chelsea Holmes
20. Maddison Smith
21. Alice Arnott
22. Grace Jeffrey (GK)
23. Abigail Wilson
24. Mariah Williams
25. Miri Maroney
27. Kaitlin Nobbs
29. Courtney Schonell
30. Makayla Jones
31. Emma Spinks
32. Grace Young
(Western Australia) Perth Thundersticks

Head Coach: Phil Hulbert

1. Phillipa Morgan
2. Kayla O'Sullivan
3. Neasa Flynn
4. Elyssa Melville
5. Aleisha Power (GK)
6. Sarah Byrnes
7. Penny Squibb
8. Georgia Wilson
9. Shanea Tonkin
10. Jesse Reid
11. Rachel Frusher
12. Liné Malan
13. Lexie Pickering
14. Elizabeth Duguid (GK)
15. Belle Ramshaw
16. Saysha Pillay
17. Annie Gibbs
18. Renee Rockliff
19. Georgina Dowd
20. Karri Somerville
22. Anna Roberts
24. Britney de Silva
(Tasmania) Tassie Tigers

Head Coach: Timothy Strapp

1. Sarah McCambridge
2. Jemma Kenworthy
3. Lucy Millington
4. Maddison Brooks
5. Taylor Brooks
7. Jade Smith
9. Emily Donovan
10. Isabelle Kruimink
11. Isabelle Sharman
12. Louise Maddock
13. Phillida Bridley
15. Lucy Cooper
16. Madison Clark
17. Kathryn Lane
19. Esmee Broekhuizen
20. Beth Dobbie
21. Lauren Canning
23. Camilla Vaughn (GK)
25. Evelyn Dalton (GK)
27. Zayna Jackson
28. Pipi Martos
30. Janelle Featherstone

== Venues ==
Sydney	Melbourne	Perth
Sydney Olympic Park	Melbourne Sports Centre	Perth Hockey Stadium
Capacity: 8,000	Capacity: 8,000	Capacity: 6,000
Adelaide	2023 Women's Hockey One is located in Australia	
MATE Stadium	2023 Women's Hockey One is located in Australia	
Capacity: 4,000	2023 Women's Hockey One is located in Australia	
Brisbane	2023 Women's Hockey One is located in Australia	
State Hockey Centre	2023 Women's Hockey One is located in Australia	
Capacity: 1,000	2023 Women's Hockey One is located in Australia	
Canberra	2023 Women's Hockey One is located in Australia	
National Hockey Centre	2023 Women's Hockey One is located in Australia	
Hobart	2023 Women's Hockey One is located in Australia	
Tasmanian Hockey Centre	2023 Women's Hockey One is located in Australia	

== Results ==
=== Preliminary round ===
Pos	Team	Pld	W	WD	LD	L	GF	GA	GD	Pts	Qualification
1	(Queensland) Brisbane Blaze	6	4	0	1	1	27	13	+14	22	Semi-finals
2	(New South Wales) NSW Pride	6	4	0	1	1	19	9	+10	22	Semi-finals
3	(Australian Capital Territory) Canberra Chill	6	3	2	0	1	16	11	+5	21	Semi-finals
4	(Western Australia) Perth Thundersticks	6	4	0	0	2	17	11	+6	20	Semi-finals
5	(Victoria (state)) HC Melbourne	6	2	1	0	3	7	10	−3	13	
6	(South Australia) Adelaide Fire	6	1	0	1	4	5	15	−10	7	
7	(Tasmania) Tassie Tigers	6	0	0	0	6	6	28	−22	0	

Source: Hockey One
Rules for classification: 1) points; 2) matches won; 3) goal difference; 4) goals for; 5) head-to-head result; 6) field goals scored.

==== Fixtures ====
6 October 2023
18:30 (AEDT)

Tassie Tigers (Tasmania)	0–1	(Victoria (state)) HC Melbourne
	Report	Peeters 4'

Tasmanian Hockey Centre, Hobart
Umpires:
Kristy Robertson (AUS)
Nicola Brown (AUS)

7 October 2023
17:00 (AWST)

Perth Thundersticks (Western Australia)	4–1	(Australian Capital Territory) Canberra Chill
Flynn 16', 16'; Ramshaw 18'; Dowd 47'	Report	Upton 43'

Perth Hockey Stadium, Perth
Umpires:
Aleisha Neumann (AUS)
Rhiannon Murrie (AUS)

8 October 2023
13:00 (ACDT)

Adelaide Fire (South Australia)	0–4	(Queensland) Brisbane Blaze
	Report	Stewart 41'; M. Fitzpatrick 51'; Wilkinson 60'; Kenny 60+'

MATE Stadium, Adelaide
Umpires:
Deborah O'Connell (AUS)
Cassidy Gallagher (AUS)

13 October 2023
18:30 (AEDT)

HC Melbourne (Victoria (state))	2–1	(South Australia) Adelaide Fire
Downes 9'; Gravenall 45+'	Report	Sharman 37'

Melbourne Sports Centre, Melbourne
Umpires:
Iris Milham (AUS)
Nicola Brown (AUS)

14 October 2023
18:30 (AEST)

Brisbane Blaze (Queensland)	1–3	(New South Wales) NSW Pride
M. Fitzpatrick 45+'	Report	Reid 7', 7'; Stewart 15+'

State Hockey Centre, Brisbane
Umpires:
Deborah O'Connell (AUS)
Aleisha Neumann (AUS)

15 October 2023
15:30 (AEDT)

Canberra Chill (Australian Capital Territory)	4–0	(Tasmania) Tassie Tigers
N. Evans 5'; Mullan 24'; Cotter 42'; Hawkshaw 52'	Report

National Hockey Centre, Canberra
Umpires:
Kristy Robertson (AUS)
Emily Carroll (AUS)

20 October 2023
18:30 (AEDT)

Tassie Tigers (Tasmania)	1–4	(Western Australia) Perth Thundersticks
Millington 11'	Report	De Silva 6', 6'; Dowd 9'; Malan 53'

Tasmanian Hockey Centre, Hobart
Umpires:
Rhiannon Murrie (AUS)
Emily Carroll (AUS)

21 October 2023
18:00 (ACDT)

Adelaide Fire (South Australia)	2–2	(Australian Capital Territory) Canberra Chill
Peris 19'; MacLachlan 26'	Report	Commerford 13', 42'
Penalties
Peris (penalty shoot-out scored); Wang (penalty shoot-out scored); Claxton (penalty shoot-out missed); MacLachlan (penalty shoot-out missed); Sharkey (penalty shoot-out missed)	2–3	(penalty shoot-out scored) Patterson; (penalty shoot-out scored) Yee; (penalty shoot-out missed) Hawkshaw; (penalty shoot-out scored) N. Evans; (penalty shoot-out missed) Mullan

MATE Stadium, Adelaide
Umpires:
Iris Milham (AUS)
Deborah O'Connell (AUS)

22 October 2023
13:30 (AEDT)

NSW Pride (New South Wales)	1–1	(Victoria (state)) HC Melbourne
Arnott 57'	Report	Downes 43'
Penalties
Hayes (penalty shoot-out scored); Williams (penalty shoot-out scored); Wilson (penalty shoot-out missed); Arnott (penalty shoot-out scored); Reid (penalty shoot-out missed)	3–4	(penalty shoot-out scored) Barden; (penalty shoot-out scored) A. Lawton; (penalty shoot-out missed) A. Utri; (penalty shoot-out scored) Bates; (penalty shoot-out scored) Peeters

Sydney Olympic Park, Sydney
Umpires:
Michelle Farnill (AUS)
Cassidy Gallagher (AUS)

27 October 2023
18:30 (AEST)

Brisbane Blaze (Queensland)	9–3	(Tasmania) Tassie Tigers
Gallagher 22', 59'; S. Fitzpatrick 25'; Malone 39', 39', 41'; Kenny 50'; Harris 57', 57'	Report	Bridley 5'; Smith 33', 34'

State Hockey Centre, Brisbane
Umpires:
Aleisha Neumann (AUS)
Deborah O'Connell (AUS)

28 October 2023
15:00 (AEDT)

Canberra Chill (Australian Capital Territory)	5–2	(New South Wales) NSW Pride
Yee 5'; M. Evans 9', 18'; N. Evans 45', 45'	Report	Jones 5', 6'

National Hockey Centre, Canberra
Umpires:
Kristy Robertson (AUS)
Emily Carroll (AUS)

29 October 2023
13:30 (AWST)

Perth Thundersticks (Western Australia)	1–0	(Victoria (state)) HC Melbourne
Squibb 30'	Report

Perth Hockey Stadium, Perth
Umpires:
Nicola Brown (AUS)
Cassidy Gallagher (AUS)

3 November 2023
18:30 (AEDT)

HC Melbourne (Victoria (state))	2–5	(Queensland) Brisbane Blaze
A. Utri 19', 19'	Report	M. Fitzpatrick 13'; S. Fitzpatrick 15', 45+'; Kershaw 28', 28'

Melbourne Sports Centre, Melbourne
Umpires:
Rhiannon Murrie (AUS)
Nicola Brown (AUS)

4 November 2023
20:00 (AEDT)

NSW Pride (New South Wales)	8–1	(Tasmania) Tassie Tigers
Reid 7', 7', 30', 30'; Nobbs 12'; Hayes 41', 41'; Young 49'	Report	M. Brooks 43'

Sydney Olympic Park, Sydney
Umpires:
Michelle Farnill (AUS)
Cassidy Gallagher (AUS)

5 November 2023
13:00 (ACDT)

Adelaide Fire (South Australia)	0–4	(Western Australia) Perth Thundersticks
	Report	Malan 11', 11'; Pickering 33'; Melville 39'

MATE Stadium, Adelaide
Umpires:
Iris Milham (AUS)
Kristy Robertson (AUS)

10 November 2023
18:30 (AEDT)

Canberra Chill (Australian Capital Territory)	2–2	(Queensland) Brisbane Blaze
Commerford 31', 31'	Report	Cullum-Sanders 2', 2'
Penalties
Patterson (penalty shoot-out scored); Yee (penalty shoot-out missed); Commerford (penalty shoot-out missed); N. Evans (penalty shoot-out scored); Mullan (penalty shoot-out scored)	3–2	(penalty shoot-out scored) Kershaw; (penalty shoot-out missed) S. Fitzpatrick; (penalty shoot-out scored) Cullum-Sanders; (penalty shoot-out missed) Malone; (penalty shoot-out missed) M. Fitzpatrick

National Hockey Centre, Canberra
Umpires:
Kristy Robertson (AUS)
Emily Carroll (AUS)

11 November 2023
20:00 (AEDT)

Tassie Tigers (Tasmania)	1–2	(South Australia) Adelaide Fire
Millington 28'	Report	Spano 35'; Crowley 50'

Tasmanian Hockey Centre, Hobart
Umpires:
Iris Milham (AUS)
Aleisha Neumann (AUS)

12 November 2023
15:00 (AWST)

Perth Thundersticks (Western Australia)	1–3	(New South Wales) NSW Pride
Malan 32'	Report	Williams 1'; Smith 12'; Arnott 33'

Perth Hockey Stadium, Perth
Umpires:
Melissa Trivic (AUS)
Peter Wright (RSA)

17 November 2023
20:00 (AEDT)

HC Melbourne (Victoria (state))	1–2	(Australian Capital Territory) Canberra Chill
Downes 12'	Report	Yee 7'; Cotter 34'

Melbourne Sports Centre, Melbourne
Umpires:
Rhiannon Murrie (AUS)
Nicola Brown (AUS)

18 November 2023
18:30 (AEDT)

NSW Pride (New South Wales)	2–0	(South Australia) Adelaide Fire
Stewart 38', 38'	Report

Sydney Olympic Park, Sydney
Umpires:
Michelle Farnill (AUS)
Cassidy Gallagher (AUS)

19 November 2023
16:00 (AEST)

Brisbane Blaze (Queensland)	6–3	(Western Australia) Perth Thundersticks
Kershaw 4'; Wilkinson 14', 32'; Malone 24'; S. Fitzpatrick 40', 40'	Report	Squibb 9'; Pickering 56', 56'

State Hockey Centre, Brisbane
Umpires:
Deborah O'Connell (AUS)
Aleisha Neumann (AUS)

=== Classification round ===
Semi-finals
25 November
(Queensland) Brisbane Blaze (pen.)	2 (4)
(Western Australia) Perth Thundersticks	2 (2)
25 November
(New South Wales) NSW Pride	1
(Australian Capital Territory) Canberra Chill	4

Final
26 November
(Queensland) Brisbane Blaze	4
(Australian Capital Territory) Canberra Chill	1
Third place
26 November
(Western Australia) Perth Thundersticks	2
(New South Wales) NSW Pride	1

==== Semi-finals ====
25 November 2023
11:00

Brisbane Blaze (Queensland)	2–2	(Western Australia) Perth Thundersticks
D. Dolkens 4'; Greiner 53'	Report	Malan 36'; Squibb 55'
Penalties
Kershaw (penalty shoot-out scored); S. Fitzpatrick (penalty shoot-out scored); Malone (penalty shoot-out scored); Greiner (penalty shoot-out scored)	4–2	(penalty shoot-out missed) Melville; (penalty shoot-out missed) Wilson; (penalty shoot-out scored) Byrnes; (penalty shoot-out scored) Tonkin

National Hockey Centre, Canberra
Umpires:
Emily Carroll (AUS)
Cassidy Gallagher (AUS)

25 November 2023
14:30

NSW Pride (New South Wales)	1–4	(Australian Capital Territory) Canberra Chill
Van Haeringen 12'	Report	Cotter 15'; Upton 27'; N. Evans 33', 33'

National Hockey Centre, Canberra
Umpires:
Aleisha Neumann (AUS)
Nicola Brown (AUS)

==== Third and fourth place ====
26 November 2023
11:30

Perth Thundersticks (Western Australia)	2–1	(New South Wales) NSW Pride
Squibb 24'; Malan 49'	Report	Nobbs 56'

National Hockey Centre, Canberra
Umpires:
Emily Carroll (AUS)
Nicola Brown (AUS)

==== Final ====
26 November 2023
15:30

Brisbane Blaze (Queensland)	4–1	(Australian Capital Territory) Canberra Chill
Wilkinson 37'; D. Dolkens 56'; S. Fitzpatrick 59', 59'	Report	Mullan 19'

National Hockey Centre, Canberra
Umpires:
Aleisha Neumann (AUS)
Cassidy Gallagher (AUS)

== Awards ==
Top Goalscorer(s)	Player of the League
(New South Wales) Laura Reid	(New South Wales) Kaitlin Nobbs

== Final standings ==
Pos	Team	Pld	W	WD	LD	L	GF	GA	GD	Pts	Final standing
1st place, gold medalist(s)	(Queensland) Brisbane Blaze	8	5	1	1	1	33	16	+17	30	Gold Medal
2nd place, silver medalist(s)	(Australian Capital Territory) Canberra Chill	8	4	2	0	2	21	16	+5	26	Silver Medal
3rd place, bronze medalist(s)	(Western Australia) Perth Thundersticks	8	5	0	1	2	21	14	+7	27	Bronze Medal
4	(New South Wales) NSW Pride	8	4	0	1	3	21	15	+6	22	Fourth Place
5	(Victoria (state)) HC Melbourne	6	2	1	0	3	7	10	−3	13	Eliminated in Group Stage
6	(South Australia) Adelaide Fire	6	1	0	1	4	5	15	−10	7	Eliminated in Group Stage
7	(Tasmania) Tassie Tigers	6	0	0	0	6	6	28	−22	0	Eliminated in Group Stage

Source: Hockey Australia

== Goalscorers ==
There were 114 goals scored in 25 matches, for an average of 4.56 goals per match.

7 goals

- (Queensland) Savannah Fitzpatrick

6 goals

- (New South Wales) Laura Reid
- (Western Australia) Liné Malan

5 goals

- (Australian Capital Territory) Naomi Evans

4 goals

- (Queensland) Ambrosia Malone
- (Queensland) Britt Wilkinson
- (Australian Capital Territory) Kalindi Commerford
- (Western Australia) Penny Squibb

3 goals

- (Queensland) Madison Fitzpatrick
- (Queensland) Stephanie Kershaw
- (Australian Capital Territory) Kaitlin Cotter
- (New South Wales) Grace Stewart
- (Victoria (state)) Olivia Downes
- (Western Australia) Lexie Pickering

2 goals

- (Queensland) Hannah Cullum-Sanders
- (Queensland) Dayle Dolkens
- (Queensland) Morgan Gallagher
- (Queensland) Ruby Harris
- (Queensland) Jodie Kenny
- (Australian Capital Territory) Mikayla Evans
- (Australian Capital Territory) Kathryn Mullan
- (Australian Capital Territory) Róisín Upton
- (Australian Capital Territory) Lauren Yee
- (Victoria (state)) Aisling Utri
- (New South Wales) Alice Arnott
- (New South Wales) Greta Hayes
- (New South Wales) Makayla Jones
- (New South Wales) Kaitlin Nobbs
- (Western Australia) Georgina Dowd
- (Western Australia) Neasa Flynn
- (Western Australia) Britney de Silva
- (Tasmania) Lucy Millington
- (Tasmania) Jade Smith

1 goal

- (South Australia) Anna Crowley
- (South Australia) Euleena MacLachlan
- (South Australia) Brooke Peris
- (South Australia) Lucy Sharman
- (South Australia) Michaela Spano
- (Queensland) Rebecca Greiner
- (Queensland) Tatum Stewart
- (Australian Capital Territory) Sarah Hawkshaw
- (Victoria (state)) Hannah Gravenall
- (Victoria (state)) Joanne Peeters
- (New South Wales) Meike van Haeringen
- (New South Wales) Maddison Smith
- (New South Wales) Mariah Williams
- (New South Wales) Grace Young
- (Western Australia) Elyssa Melville
- (Western Australia) Belle Ramshaw
- (Tasmania) Phillida Bridley
- (Tasmania) Maddison Brooks

Source: Hockey Australia
