= 2022 Women's Under–21 Australian Hockey Championships =

2022 Women's Under–21 Australian Championships
Tournament details
- Host country: Australia
- City: Perth
- Dates: 20–27 July
- Teams: 8
- Venue: Perth Hockey Stadium

Final positions
- Champions: (Victoria (state)) VIC
- Runner-up: (Western Australia) WA
- Third place: (Queensland) QLD

Tournament statistics
- Matches played: 24
- Goals scored: 84 (3.5 per match)
- Top scorer: (Queensland) Tatum Stewart (7 goals)
- Best player: (New South Wales) Grace Young

The 2022 Women's Under–21 Australian Hockey Championship was a field hockey tournament held from 20 to 27 July in Perth, Western Australia. It was the first time the tournament had been held since 2019 following two-years of cancellations caused by the COVID-19 pandemic.

Victoria won the tournament, defeating Western Australia 3–1 on penalties after the final finished as a 2–2 draw.

== Competition format ==
The tournament was divided into two pools, Pool A and Pool B, consisting of four teams in a round-robin format. At the conclusion of the pool stage, teams progress to the quarterfinals, where the winners progress to contest the medal matches, while the losing teams playoff for fifth to eighth place.

== Teams ==
- (Australian Capital Territory) ACT
- (New South Wales) NSW Blue
- (New South Wales) NSW State
- (Queensland) QLD
- (South Australia) SA
- (Tasmania) TAS
- (Victoria (state)) VIC
- (Western Australia) WA

== Results ==
All times are local (AWST).

=== Preliminary round ===
==== Pool A ====
Pos	Team	Pld	W	D	L	GF	GA	GD	Pts
1	(Queensland) QLD	3	3	0	0	11	1	+10	9
2	(New South Wales) NSW State	3	2	0	1	11	2	+9	6
3	(South Australia) SA	3	0	1	2	1	9	−8	1
4	(Australian Capital Territory) ACT	3	0	1	2	1	12	−11	1

Source: Hockey Australia

20 July 2022
10:30

SA (South Australia)	1–1	(Australian Capital Territory) ACT
Hoffman 32'	Report	Martin 60+'

Umpires:
Tamara Leonard (AUS)
Iris Milham (AUS)

20 July 2022
12:30

QLD (Queensland)	2–1	(New South Wales) NSW State
Stewart 24'; Harris 55'	Report	Kavanagh 59'

Umpires:
Paula Grover-Johnson (AUS)
Kristy Robertson (AUS)

21 July 2022
12:00

NSW State (New South Wales)	5–0	(Australian Capital Territory) ACT
Jones 3'; Neilson 17'; Kavanagh 30'; Tobbe 37'; Duncan 44'	Report

Umpires:
Nicola Brown (AUS)
Deborah O'Connell (AUS)

21 July 2022
14:00

SA (South Australia)	0–3	(Queensland) QLD
	Report	West 26'; Stewart 41'; J. Smith 48'

Umpires:
Melanie Blanchard (AUS)
Cassidy Gallagher (AUS)

23 July 2022
11:00

QLD (Queensland)	6–0	(Australian Capital Territory) ACT
Kenny 37'; Harris 43', 58'; Stewart 44', 53'; West 56'	Report

Umpires:
Iris Milham (AUS)
Nicola Brown (AUS)

23 July 2022
13:00

NSW State (New South Wales)	5–0	(South Australia) SA
Pickering 5', 22', 44'; Neilson 28', 35'	Report

Umpires:
Tamara Leonard (AUS)
Paula Grover-Johnson (AUS)

==== Pool B ====
Pos	Team	Pld	W	D	L	GF	GA	GD	Pts
1	(Victoria (state)) VIC	3	3	0	0	7	1	+6	9
2	(Western Australia) WA	3	1	1	1	3	4	−1	4
3	(Tasmania) TAS	3	0	2	1	1	3	−2	2
4	(New South Wales) NSW Blue	3	0	1	2	2	5	−3	1

Source: Hockey Australia

20 July 2022
14:30

VIC (Victoria (state))	3–1	(Tasmania) TAS
Hodgson 20'; Palubski 29'; Cotter 56'	Report	M. Brooks 37'

Umpires:
Deborah O'Connell (AUS)
Melanie Blanchard (AUS)

20 July 2022
16:30

WA (Western Australia)	3–2	(New South Wales) NSW Blue
Van der Zwan 42'; De Silva 44', 60+'	Report	L. Maroney 8'; Rowe 39'

Umpires:
Emily Ogden (AUS)
Nicola Brown (AUS)

21 July 2022
16:00

TAS (Tasmania)	0–0	(New South Wales) NSW Blue
	Report

Umpires:
Iris Milham (AUS)
Paula Grover-Johnson (AUS)

21 July 2022
18:00

WA (Western Australia)	0–2	(Victoria (state)) VIC
	Report	Stansby 17'; Ward 47'

Umpires:
Tamara Leonard (AUS)
Kristy Robertson (AUS)

23 July 2022
09:00

VIC (Victoria (state))	2–0	(New South Wales) NSW Blue
Love 6'; Cotter 22'	Report

Umpires:
Kristy Robertson (AUS)
Cassidy Gallagher (AUS)

23 July 2022
15:00

TAS (Tasmania)	0–0	(Western Australia) WA
	Report

Umpires:
Melanie Blanchard (AUS)
Emily Ogden (AUS)

=== Classification round ===
Quarter-finals
24 July 2022
(Queensland) QLD	5
(New South Wales) NSW Blue	0
24 July 2022
(Western Australia) WA	3
(South Australia) SA	2
24 July 2022
(Victoria (state)) VIC	4
(Australian Capital Territory) ACT	0
24 July 2022
(New South Wales) NSW State	4
(Tasmania) TAS	1

Semi-finals
26 July 2022
(Queensland) QLD	1
(Western Australia) WA	2
26 July 2022
(Victoria (state)) VIC	3
(New South Wales) NSW State	2

Final
27 July 2022
(Western Australia) WA	2 (1)
(Victoria (state)) VIC (pen.)	2 (3)
Third-place match
27 July 2022
(Queensland) QLD (pen.)	2 (3)
(New South Wales) NSW State	2 (2)

==== Quarter-finals ====
24 July 2022
13:00

QLD (Queensland)	5–0	(New South Wales) NSW Blue
Stewart 16', 21'; Fitzpatrick 24'; Dolkens 49'; Office 51'	Report

Umpires:
Melanie Blanchard (AUS)
Tamara Leonard (AUS)

24 July 2022
15:00

NSW State (New South Wales)	4–1	(Tasmania) TAS
Young 3'; Duncan 29', 40'; Jones 31'	Report	Kruimink 52'

Umpires:
Kristy Robertson (AUS)
Nicola Brown (AUS)

24 July 2022
17:00

WA (Western Australia)	3–2	(South Australia) SA
Flynn 7'; Fenwick 8'; Dowd 48'	Report	Sharkey 47'; Sharman 60+'

Umpires:
Deborah O'Connell (AUS)
Cassidy Gallagher (AUS)

24 July 2022
19:00

VIC (Victoria (state))	4–0	(Australian Capital Territory) ACT
Cotter 3', 57'; Lawton 20'; Hamilton-Smith 25'	Report

Umpires:
Emily Ogden (AUS)
Iris Milham (AUS)

==== Fifth to eighth place classification ====
Crossover
26 July 2022
(New South Wales) NSW Blue	1
(South Australia) SA	3
26 July 2022
(Australian Capital Territory) ACT	1
(Tasmania) TAS	3

Fifth-place match
27 July 2022
(South Australia) SA	0 (1)
(Tasmania) TAS (pen.)	0 (3)
Seventh-place match
27 July 2022
(New South Wales) NSW Blue	3
(Australian Capital Territory) ACT	1

===== Crossover =====
26 July 2022
09:40

ACT (Australian Capital Territory)	1–3	(Tasmania) TAS
Dooley 37'	Report	M. Brooks 27', 54'; Dobbie 36'

Umpires:
Cassidy Gallagher (AUS)
Emily Ogden (AUS)

26 July 2022
11:50

NSW Blue (New South Wales)	1–3	(South Australia) SA
Carr 23'	Report	Stripling 6'; Hoffman 30'; Edmonds 33'

Umpires:
Paula Grover-Johnson (AUS)
Melanie Blanchard (AUS)

===== Seventh and eighth place =====
27 July 2022
11:10

NSW Blue (New South Wales)	3–1	(Australian Capital Territory) ACT
Russell 6', 20'; L. Maroney 37'	Report	Martin 45+'

Umpires:
Iris Milham (AUS)
Paula Grover-Johnson (AUS)

===== Fifth and sixth place =====
27 July 2022
17:40

SA (South Australia)	0–0	TAS (Tasmania)
	Report
Penalties
Van der Ploeg (penalty shoot-out scored); Sharman (penalty shoot-out missed); Hoffman (penalty shoot-out missed); Mitreska (penalty shoot-out missed)	1–3	(penalty shoot-out scored) Gunn; (penalty shoot-out scored) Canning; (penalty shoot-out scored) M. Brooks; (penalty shoot-out missed) Rockerfeller

Umpires:
Emily Ogden (AUS)
Cassidy Gallagher (AUS)

==== First to fourth place classification ====
===== Semi-finals =====
26 July 2022
09:10

QLD (Queensland)	1–2	(Western Australia) WA
Stewart 32'	Report	Freedman 5'; Ramshaw 35'

Umpires:
Kristy Robertson (AUS)
Deborah O'Connell (AUS)

26 July 2022
11:20

VIC (Victoria (state))	3–2	(New South Wales) NSW State
Stansby 15+'; Cotter 17'; Geddis 36'	Report	Young 38', 40'

Umpires:
Tamara Leonard (AUS)
Nicola Brown (AUS)

===== Third and fourth place =====
26 July 2022
11:40

QLD (Queensland)	2–2	(New South Wales) NSW State
Reid 3'; L. Smith 37'	Report	Tobbe 7'; Jones 26'
Penalties
Fitzpatrick (penalty shoot-out scored); West (penalty shoot-out missed); Reid (penalty shoot-out scored); Office (penalty shoot-out missed); L. Smith (penalty shoot-out scored)	3–2	(penalty shoot-out missed) Pickering; (penalty shoot-out scored) Kavanagh; (penalty shoot-out missed) Young; (penalty shoot-out missed) Tait; (penalty shoot-out scored) Duncan

Umpires:
Nicola Brown (AUS)
Kristy Robertson (AUS)

===== Final =====
26 July 2022
16:00

WA (Western Australia)	2–2	(Victoria (state)) VIC
Dowd 54'; Enslin 59'	Report	Love 13'; Hamilton-Smith 28'
Penalties
Sertorio (penalty shoot-out missed); Van der Zwan (penalty shoot-out scored); De Silva (penalty shoot-out missed); Dowd (penalty shoot-out missed)	1–3	(penalty shoot-out scored) Hamilton-Smith; (penalty shoot-out scored) Cotter; (penalty shoot-out scored) Lawton; (penalty shoot-out missed) Howie

Umpires:
Deborah O'Connell (AUS)
Tamara Leonard (AUS)

== Final standings ==
Pos	Grp	Team	Pld	W	D	L	GF	GA	GD	Pts	Final result
1st place, gold medalist(s)	B	(Victoria (state)) VIC	6	5	1	0	16	5	+11	16	Gold Medal
2nd place, silver medalist(s)	B	(Western Australia) WA	6	3	2	1	10	9	+1	11	Silver Medal
3rd place, bronze medalist(s)	A	(Queensland) QLD	6	4	1	1	19	5	+14	13	Bronze Medal
4	A	(New South Wales) NSW State	6	3	1	2	19	8	+11	10	
5	B	(Tasmania) TAS	6	1	3	2	5	8	−3	6	
6	A	(South Australia) SA	6	1	2	3	6	13	−7	5	
7	B	(New South Wales) NSW Blue	6	1	1	4	6	14	−8	4	
8	A	(Australian Capital Territory) ACT	6	0	1	5	3	22	−19	1	

Source: Hockey Australia

== Goalscorers ==
There were 84 goals scored in 24 matches, for an average of 3.5 goals per match.

7 goals

- (Queensland) Tatum Stewart

5 goals

- (Victoria (state)) Hannah Cotter

3 goals

- (New South Wales) Naomi Duncan
- (New South Wales) Lily Neilson
- (New South Wales) Lexie Pickering
- (New South Wales) Makayla Jones
- (New South Wales) Grace Young
- (Queensland) Ruby Harris
- (Tasmania) Maddison Brooks

2 goals

- (Australian Capital Territory) Olivia Martin
- (New South Wales) Alana Kavanagh
- (New South Wales) Lili Maroney
- (New South Wales) Hannah Russell
- (New South Wales) Helena Tobbe
- (Queensland) Georgina West
- (South Australia) Carly Hoffman
- (Victoria (state)) Emily Hamilton-Smith
- (Victoria (state)) Samantha Love
- (Victoria (state)) Evie Stansby
- (Western Australia) Georgina Dowd
- (Western Australia) Britney de Silva

1 goal

- (Australian Capital Territory) Madeline Dooley
- (New South Wales) Ella Carr
- (New South Wales) Lauren Rowe
- (Queensland) Dayle Dolkens
- (Queensland) Kendra Fitzpatrick
- (Queensland) Madeline Kenny
- (Queensland) Jordn Office
- (Queensland) Jade Reid
- (Queensland) Jade Smith
- (Queensland) Laney-Belle Smith
- (South Australia) Claudia Edmonds
- (South Australia) Katie Sharkey
- (South Australia) Lucy Sharman
- (South Australia) Amy Stripling
- (Tasmania) Isabelle Kruimink
- (Tasmania) Elizabeth Dobbie
- (Victoria (state)) Gracie Geddis
- (Victoria (state)) Charlotte Hodgson
- (Victoria (state)) Josie Lawton
- (Victoria (state)) Tess Palubski
- (Victoria (state)) Zali Ward
- (Western Australia) Nicole Enslin
- (Western Australia) Neasa Flynn
- (Western Australia) Jessica Freedman
- (Western Australia) Maddison Fenwick
- (Western Australia) Belle Ramshaw
- (Western Australia) Jade van der Zwan

Source: Hockey Australia
