= State Hockey Centre =

State Hockey Centre may refer to:

- State Hockey Centre (South Australia), Adelaide, Australia.
- State Netball and Hockey Centre, Victoria, Australia.
- Queensland State Hockey Centre, Queensland, Australia.
- Sydney Olympic Park Hockey Centre, New South Wales, Australia.
