= 2022 Women's Junior Oceania Cup =

Field hockey tournament

Tournament details
- Host country: Australia
- City: Canberra
- Dates: 8–11 December
- Teams: 2 (from 1 confederation)
- Venue: National Hockey Centre

Final positions
- Champions: Australia (6th title)
- Runner-up: New Zealand

Tournament statistics
- Matches played: 3
- Goals scored: 13 (4.33 per match)
- Top scorer: (Australia) Tatum Stewart (4 goals)

The 2022 Women's Junior Oceania Cup was the sixth edition of the Junior Oceania Cup for women. The tournament consisted of three test matches between the national under–21 teams of Australia and New Zealand. It was held at the National Hockey Centre in Canberra, Australia from 8–11 December.

The tournament served as a qualifier for the 2023 FIH Junior World Cup to be held in Santiago, Chile. As only two national associations will participate, both teams will automatically qualify as the OHF receives two qualification places.

== Squads ==
The squads were named on 7 November and 25 October, respectively.

Australia

Head Coach: Stacia Strain

1. Jade Smith
2. Ruby Harris
3. Maddison Brooks
4. Hannah Kable
5. Gracie Geddis
6. Georgina West
7. Makayla Jones
8. Alana Kavanagh
9. Neasa Flynn
10. Carly Hoffmann
11. Zali Ward
12. Josie Lawton
13. Tatum Stewart
14. Emily Hamilton-Smith
16. Ciara Utri
17. Jolie Sertorio (C)
26. Evie Dalton (GK)
27. Bridget Lauranace (GK)
New Zealand

Head Coach: Mitchell Hayde

1. Emily Baker
2. Paige Blake
3. Breana Catley
4. Brodie Cochrane (GK)
5. Hannah Cotter
6. Jaimee Eades
7. Emma Findlay
8. Isabella Gill (C)
9. Sophie Hildesley
10. Leah Hodges
11. Jessica Kelly
12. Emily Logan
13. Alice McIlroy-Foster (GK)
14. Riana Pho
15. Tessa Reid
16. Annabelle Schneideman
17. Issy Story
18. Brittany Wang

== Results ==
All times are local (AEDT).

=== Standings ===
Pos	Team	Pld	W	D	L	GF	GA	GD	Pts	Qualification
1	Australia (H, C)	3	2	1	0	9	4	+5	7	2023 FIH Junior World Cup
2	New Zealand	3	0	1	2	4	9	−5	1	2023 FIH Junior World Cup

Source: FIH
Rules for classification: 1) points; 2) goal difference; 3) goals scored; 4) head-to-head result.
(C) Champions; (H) Hosts

=== Fixtures ===
8 December 2022
16:00

Australia	2–2	New Zealand
Stewart 3'; Harris 45'	Report	Catley 12'; Hildesley 58'

Umpires:
Lani Jackman (AUS)
Tamara Leonard (AUS)

10 December 2022
15:30

Australia	4–2	New Zealand
Stewart 5', 13', 57'; Harris 50'	Report	Catley 21', 33'

Umpires:
Tamara Leonard (AUS)
Lani Jackman (AUS)

11 December 2022
14:30

Australia	3–0	New Zealand
Flynn 16'; Jones 34', 56'	Report

Umpires:
Lani Jackman (AUS)
Tamara Leonard (AUS)

== Goalscorers ==
There were 13 goals scored in 3 matches, for an average of 4.33 goals per match.

4 goals

- (Australia) Tatum Stewart

3 goals

- (New Zealand) Breana Catley

2 goals

- (Australia) Ruby Harris
- (Australia) Makayla Jones

1 goal

- (Australia) Neasa Flynn
- (New Zealand) Sophie Hildesley

Source: FIH
