= Jillian Wolgemuth =

American field hockey player

Personal information
- Born: April 28, 1998 (age 28) Mount Joy, Pennsylvania, U.S.
- Height: 5 ft 8 in (172 cm)

Sport
- Sport: Field hockey
- Position: Defence
National team
Years	Team	Caps	Goals
2019	United States U–21	2	(0)
2021–	United States	46	(0)
Medal record
Women's field hockey
Representing United States
Pan American Games
Bronze medal – third place	2019 Lima	Team
FIH Olympic Qualifiers
Silver medal – second place	2024 Ranchi	Team

Jillian Wolgemuth (born April 28, 1998) is an American field hockey player, who plays as a defender.

== Personal life ==
Wolgemuth was born in Mount Joy, Pennsylvania.

Wolgemuth attended Duke University.

== Career ==
=== Domestic league ===
In 2022, Wolgemuth moved to Australia to compete in season two of the Sultana Bran Hockey One League.

=== Under–21 ===
Wolgemuth made her debut for the United States U–21 in 2019 during a test series against Germany in Viersen and Mönchengladbach.

=== Senior national team ===
Wolgemuth made her senior international debut in 2021 during season two of the FIH Pro League.

In 2023, Wolgemuth won her first medal with the national team, taking home silver at the 2023 Pan American Games in Santiago.

She has been named in the squad for the 2024 FIH Olympic Qualifiers in Ranchi.
