= Casey Dolkens =

Australian field hockey player (born 2000)

Personal information
- Born: 8 January 2000 (age 26) Durban, South Africa

Sport
- Sport: Field hockey
- Position: Defence
Senior career
Years	Team	Caps	Goals
2022–	Brisbane Blaze	-	-
National team
Years	Team	Caps	Goals
2026–	Australia	0	(0)
Medal record
Women's field hockey
Representing Australia

Casey Dolkens (born 8 January 2000) is an Australian field hockey player.

== Personal life ==
Casey Dolkens was born in Durban, South Africa. Her younger sister, Dayle, has also represented Australia at national level.

== Career ==
=== Domestic league ===
Throughout her senior career, Dolkens has competed in the Brisbane Premier League for Commercial Hockey Club.

In Hockey Australia's domestic league, the One Active Hockey One, Dolkens represents her home state as a member of the Brisbane Blaze. She was a member of the championship winning squad during the third season of the league.

=== Hockeyroos ===
In 2025, Dolkens was named in the Hockeyroos squad for the first time. She will make her senior debut during season seven of the FIH Pro League.
