= Breana Catley =

New Zealand field hockey player (born 2001)

Personal information
- Born: 26 July 2001 (age 25) Auckland, New Zealand

Sport
- Sport: Field hockey
- Position: Forward
Senior career
Years	Team	Caps	Goals
2019–2024	Auckland	-	-
2024–	Northern Tridents	-	-
National team
Years	Team	Caps	Goals
2022	New Zealand U–21	3	(3)
2024–	New Zealand	1	(0)
Medal record
Women's field hockey
Representing New Zealand
Junior Oceania Cup
Silver medal – second place	2022 Canberra

Breana Catley (born 26 July 2001) is a field hockey player from New Zealand.

== Early life ==
Breana Catley grew up in Auckland, New Zealand.

== Career ==
=== National league ===
In the Premier Hockey League, Catley plays for the Northern Tridents. She has also previously represented Auckland in the Ford National Hockey Championship, which won the 2023 Women's New Zealand National Hockey Championship.

=== Under–21 ===
Catley made her international debut in 2022 at under–21 level. She was a member of the silver medal-winning Junior Black Sticks squad at the Junior Oceania Cup in Canberra, the Oceania qualifier for the FIH Junior World Cup.

=== Black Sticks ===
In 2024, Catley received her first call-up to the Black Sticks. She made her senior international debut in 2024, making her first appearance during a test series against Japan in Auckland.

She has since been named in an extended squad for 2025.
