= Jesse Reid (field hockey) =

Australian field hockey player

Personal information
- Born: 13 December 2000 (age 25) Casuarina, Australia

Sport
- Sport: Field hockey
- Position: Midfield
Senior career
Years	Team	Caps	Goals
2019–2022	Brisbane Blaze	-	-
2023–	Perth Thundersticks	-	-
National team
Years	Team	Caps	Goals
2025–	Australia	0	(0)
Medal record
Women's field hockey
Representing Australia

Jesse Reid (born 13 December 2000) is field hockey player from Australia, who plays as a midfielder and defender.

== Personal life ==
Jesse Reid grew up in Casuarina, New South Wales.

She is the daughter of former Australian hockey player and gold medallist, Sharon Buchanan.

== Career ==
=== Domestic ===
In domestic competitions hosted by Hockey Australia, Reid currently represents Western Australia. She has also previously represented Queensland, the state in which she played junior hockey. From 2019 until 2022 she represented the Brisbane Blaze in Australia's premier domestic competition, the Liberty Hockey One League. Since 2023, she has represented the Perth Thundersticks since her move to Western Australia.

=== Hockeyroos ===
Reid is currently a Tier One member of the Australian Development Squad. During this time, she has represented the 'Australia A' squad in practice matches against the Hockeyroos, China and Japan at the 2024 International Festival of Hockey, and most recently a series against India. Following the India series, she received her first official call-up to the national team. She will make her senior internal debut during the European Leg of the 2024–25 FIH Pro League.
