= Lexie Pickering =

Australian field hockey player

Personal information
- Born: 26 June 2001 (age 25) Sydney, Australia

Sport
- Sport: Field hockey
- Position: Forward
Senior career
Years	Team	Caps	Goals
2019–2022	NSW Pride	-	-
2023–	Perth Thundersticks	-	-
National team
Years	Team	Caps	Goals
2025–	Australia	6	(3)
Medal record
Women's field hockey
Representing Australia

Lexie Pickering (born 26 June 2001) is an Australian field hockey player.

== Personal life ==
Lexie Pickering was born and raised in Sydney.

She is a scholarship holder at NSWIS.

== Career ==
=== Domestic league ===
In Hockey Australia's domestic league, the Liberty Hockey One, Pickering represents the Perth Thundersticks. She formerly represented her home state, as a member of the NSW Pride, however transitioned into the Perth Thundersticks squad when she relocated to Perth in 2023.

She has also played a season in the Dutch Hoofdklasse, relocating to the Netherlands to represent Klein Zwitserland.

=== Hockeyroos ===
In 2024, Pickering was named in the Hockeyroos squad for the first time. She will make her debut during season six of the FIH Pro League.

== International goals ==
The following is a list of goals scored by Pickering at international level.

Goal	Date	Location	Opponent	Score	Result	Competition	Ref.
1	14 June 2025	Lee Valley Hockey Stadium, London, United Kingdom	India	2–0	3–2	2024–25 FIH Pro League	
2	15 June 2025	Lee Valley Hockey Stadium, London, United Kingdom	India	2–1	2–1	2024–25 FIH Pro League	
3	22 June 2025	Ernst-Reuter-Sportfeld, Berlin, Germany	Germany	4–3	4–3	2024–25 FIH Pro League	
