= Samantha Love (field hockey) =

Australian field hockey player (born 2005)

Personal information
- Born: 29 November 2005 (age 20) Melbourne, Australia

Sport
- Sport: Field hockey
- Position: Midfield
Senior career
Years	Team	Caps	Goals
2024–	HC Melbourne	-	-
National team
Years	Team	Caps	Goals
2023–	Australia U–21	21	(2)
Medal record
Women's field hockey
Representing Australia
Junior Oceania Cup
Gold medal – first place	2025 Auckland

Samantha Love (born 29 November 2005) is a field hockey player from Australia.

She has been listed as one of the 'futures' of Australian hockey.

== Personal life ==
Love is a current scholarship holder at the Victorian Institute of Sport.

She is a former student of St Catherine's School.

== Career ==
=== Domestic ===
In Hockey Australia's premier domestic league, the One Active Hockey One, Love represents HC Melbourne.

She also competes in the Hockey Victoria Premier League, where she represents Hawthorn Hockey Club. She formerly represented MCC Hockey Club.

=== Under 21 ===
Love made her debut for the Australian U–21 side, the Jillaroos, in 2023. She made her first international appearances during a test–series against Japan in the Gold Coast.

In 2025 she was named in the squad for the Junior Oceania Cup in Auckland, where she won a gold medal. She also appeared in a test series against India in Canberra. She has most recently been named in the squad for the 2025 FIH Junior World Cup in Santiago.
