= Joanne Peeters =

Belgian field hockey player

Personal information
- Born: 9 July 1996 (age 30) Antwerp

Sport
- Sport: Field hockey
- Position: Striker
- Club: Camberwell Hockey Club, Hockey Club Melbourne
National team
Years	Team	Caps	Goals
2014–2020	Belgium	93	(16)
2022–	Belgium indoor	5	(10)

Joanne Peeters (born 9 July 1996) is a Belgian field hockey player for the Belgian national team.

She participated at the 2018 Women's Hockey World Cup.

She moved to Melbourne in 2022 and represented Hockey Club Melbourne in the 2023 Australian Hockey One league.
