= Morgan Gallagher =

Australian field hockey player

Personal information
- Born: 4 October 1997 (age 28) Brisbane, Queensland

Sport
- Sport: Field hockey
- Position: Midfield
Senior career
Years	Team	Caps	Goals
2019–	Brisbane Blaze	-	-
National team
Years	Team	Caps	Goals
2018	Australia U–21	3	(0)
2023–	Australia	3	(0)
Medal record
Women's field hockey
Representing Australia

Morgan Gallagher (born 4 October 1997) is a field hockey player from Australia.

== Personal life ==
Morgan Gallagher was born and raised in Brisbane, Queensland.

== Career ==
=== Domestic league ===
In Hockey Australia's domestic league, the Sultana Bran Hockey One, Gallagher is a member of the Brisbane Blaze. In 2019 she was a member of the premiership winning Brisbane Blaze team in the league's inaugural season.

=== Under–21 ===
Gallagher made her junior international debut in 2018 during a test series against New Zealand in Hawke's Bay.

=== Hockeyroos ===
In 2023, Gallagher was selected to make her debut for the Hockeyroos. She was named in the squad for a test series against China in Bunbury and Perth.
