= Makayla Jones =

Australian field hockey player (born 2004)

Personal information
- Born: 20 July 2004 (age 22) Goulburn, Australia

Sport
- Sport: Field hockey
- Position: Forward
Senior career
Years	Team	Caps	Goals
2022–	NSW Pride	-	-
National team
Years	Team	Caps	Goals
2022–2025	Australia U–21	31	(15)
2026–	Australia	8	(0)
Medal record
Women's field hockey
Representing Australia
Junior Oceania Cup
Gold medal – first place	2022 Canberra
Gold medal – first place	2025 Auckland

Makayla Jones (born 20 July 2004) is a field hockey player from Australia.

== Personal life ==
Jones was raised in Goulburn, New South Wales.

She is a scholarship holder at the NSW Institute of Sport.

== Career ==
=== Domestic ===
In Hockey Australia's premier domestic league, the One Active Hockey One, Jones represents the NSW Pride. In her debut season in 2022, she helped the side to a gold medal.

=== Under 21 ===
Jones made her debut for the Australian U–21 side, the Jillaroos, in 2022. She made her first international appearances during the Junior Oceania Cup in Canberra, where she won a gold medal.

Throughout 2023, Jones continued to represent the national junior squad. She was a member of the squad for a test series against Japan in the Gold Coast, followed by the FIH Junior World Cup in Santiago, where the team finished in fifth place.

In 2025 she was named in the squad for the Junior Oceania Cup in Auckland, where she won a gold medal. She also appeared in seven matches during a tour of Europe, as well as in a test series against India in Canberra. She most recently represented the squad at her second FIH Junior World Cup, also held in Santiago.
