= Laura Barden =

Australian field hockey player

Personal information
- Born: 6 September 1994 (age 31) Kew, Victoria, Australia

Sport
- Sport: Field hockey
- Position: Midfield
- Club: HGC
National team
| Years | Team | Caps | Goals |
| 2015– | Australia | 42 | (5) |
Medal record
Women's field hockey
Representing Australia
Oceania Cup
| Gold medal – first place | 2015 Stratford |

Laura Barden (born 6 September 1994) is an Australian field hockey player. She was a member of the 2017 Australian women's national field hockey team.

== Early life and education ==
Laura Barden is from Melbourne. She moved to Kew, Victoria. She was a scholarship recipient from the University of Melbourne.

== Career ==
Barden was a member of the 2014 Women's National Junior Squad for Australia. The following year she was moved up to the Australian women's national field hockey team, known as the Hockeyroos, in September 2015. She was not chosen for Australia's team for the 2016 Summer Olympics, however, by January 2017 Barden had played in 15 games and scored 4 goals in her time with the team. She was again part of the Hockeyroos team for the 2017 Hawkes Bay Cup. Barden scored Australia's only goal in an April 2017 game against New Zealand at the Festival of Hockey. Although Barden was initially named to the 2017 Oceania Cup team, she was later ruled out because of a quad injury.

In addition to playing for the Hockeyroos, Barden also plays for Camberwell Hockey Club.
