= Jolie Sertorio =

Australian field hockey player

Personal information
- Born: 15 December 2001 (age 24) Perth, Australia

Sport
- Sport: Field hockey
- Position: Midfield
Senior career
Years	Team	Caps	Goals
2019–	Perth Thundersticks	-	-
National team
Years	Team	Caps	Goals
2018–2022	Australia U–21	6	(0)
2026–	Australia	0	(0)
Medal record
Women's field hockey
Representing Australia
Junior Oceania Cup
Gold medal – first place	2022 Canberra

Jolie Sertorio (born 25 December 2001) is an Australian field hockey player.

== Personal life ==
Jolie Sertorio was born in Perth, Australia.

She is a former scholarship holder of the Western Australian Institute of Sport.

== Career ==
=== Domestic league ===
Throughout her senior career, Sertorio has competed in the Hockey WA Premier Division. Since juniors, she has been a member of the Suburban Lions HC, and continues to represent the team now.

In Hockey Australia's domestic league, the One Active Hockey One, Sertorio represents her home state as a member of the Perth Thundersticks. She was a member of the championship winning squad in both the fourth and fifth seasons of the league.

=== Under–18 ===
She was a member of the Australian U–18 team at the 2018 Youth Olympic Games in Buenos Aires.

=== Under–21 ===
Sertorio was a member of the Australian U–21 team from 2018 until 2022. Throughout her time in the squad she made only six international appearances, including a gold medal-winning performance at the Junior Oceania Cup in Canberra, where she captained the side.

=== Hockeyroos ===
In 2025, Sertorio was named in the Australian Development Squad. She was brought into the national squad for the FIH Pro League matches in Hobart, where she will make her senior international debut.
