= Jade Smith =

Australian field hockey player (born 2001)

Personal information
- Born: 16 February 2001 (age 25) Moreton Bay, Australia

Sport
- Sport: Field hockey
- Position: Forward
Senior career
Years	Team	Caps	Goals
2022–	Brisbane Blaze	-	-
National team
Years	Team	Caps	Goals
2022	Australia U–21	3	(0)
2025–	Australia	12	(5)
Medal record
Women's field hockey
Representing Australia
Junior Oceania Cup
Gold medal – first place	2022 Canberra

Jade Smith (born 16 February 2001) is an Australian field hockey player.

== Personal life ==
Jade Smith was born in Moreton Bay, and grew up in Greenbank.

== Career ==
=== Domestic league ===
In Hockey Australia's domestic league, the Liberty Hockey One, Smith represents her home state as a member of the Brisbane Blaze.

During the third season of the Hockey One, she relocated to Tasmania to represent the Tassie Tigers.

=== Under–21 ===
Smith made her international debut at under–21 level. She was a member of the gold medal-winning Jillaroos squad at the 2022 Junior Oceania Cup in Canberra.

=== Hockeyroos ===
In 2024, Smith was named in the Hockeyroos squad for the first time. She will make her senior debut during season six of the FIH Pro League.

== International goals ==
The following is a list of international goals scored by Smith.

Goal	Date	Location	Opponent	Score	Result	Competition	Ref.
1	5 February 2025	Sydney Olympic Park, Sydney, Australia	Spain	1–0	4–1	2024–25 FIH Pro League	
2	8 February 2025	Sydney Olympic Park, Sydney, Australia	Spain	1–0	3–1	2024–25 FIH Pro League	
3	20 February 2025	Polideportivo Provincial, Santiago del Estero, Argentina	Argentina	1–2	1–2	2024–25 FIH Pro League	
4	23 February 2025	Polideportivo Provincial, Santiago del Estero, Argentina	Argentina	1–0	1–2	2024–25 FIH Pro League	
5	18 June 2025	Lee Valley Hockey Stadium, London, United Kingdom	England	1–0	3–0	2024–25 FIH Pro League	
