= Neasa Flynn =

Australian field hockey player

Personal information
- Born: 13 August 2001 (age 25) Perth, Australia

Sport
- Sport: Field hockey
- Position: Forward
Senior career
Years	Team	Caps	Goals
2022–	Perth Thundersticks	-	-
National team
Years	Team	Caps	Goals
2022–2022	Australia U–21	3	(1)
2026–	Australia	8	(3)
Medal record
Women's field hockey
Representing Australia
Junior Oceania Cup
Gold medal – first place	2022 Canberra

Neasa Flynn (born 13 August 2001) is an Australian field hockey player.

== Personal life ==
Neasa Flynn was born in Perth, Australia.

She is a student at Curtin University, and holds a scholarship at the Western Australian Institute of Sport.

== Career ==
=== Domestic league ===
Throughout her senior career, Flynn has competed in the Hockey WA Premier Division. Until 2021 she represented Melville City Hockey Club, and has played for the UWA Hockey Club since the 2022 season.

In Hockey Australia's domestic league, the One Active Hockey One, Flynn represents her home state as a member of the Perth Thundersticks. She was a member of the championship winning squad in both the fourth and fifth seasons of the league.

=== Under–21 ===
In 2022, Flynn made her first and only appearances for the Australia U–21 team. She was a member of the gold medal-winning squad at the Junior Oceania Cup in Canberra.

=== Hockeyroos ===
Flynn was named in the Hockeyroos squad for the first time in 2025. She will make her senior debut during season seven of the FIH Pro League.
