= NSW Pride =

Australian field hockey club

- Full name: New South Wales Pride
- Nickname(s): The Lions
- Short name: The Pride
- League: Hockey One
- Founded: 17 April 2019; 7 years ago
- Colors: Gold & Red
- Home ground: Sydney Olympic Park, Sydney (Capacity 8,000)

Personnel
- Coach: Brent Livermore & Katrina Powell
- Website: www.nswpride.com.au

Performance
- Winners: 2019, 2022 (men); 2022 (women)
Home

NSW Pride is an Australian professional field hockey club based in Sydney. The club was established in 2019, and is one of 7 established to compete in Hockey Australia's new premier domestic competition, Hockey One.

The club unifies both men and women under one name, unlike New South Wales' former representation in the Australian Hockey League as the NSW Waratahs (men) and NSW Arrows (women).

NSW Pride competed for the first time in the inaugural season of Hockey One, which was contested from late September through to mid November 2019.

The NSW Pride Men's came first, becoming the inaugural Hockey One Men's Champions and defeating the Brisbane Blaze 8–3 in the Grand Final, with Flynn Ogilvie being named Player of the Final and Blake Govers as the tournaments Top Goalscorer. The Men would win their 2nd championship after the league resumed post-covid, winning 2-0 against Perth in 2022. The Pride would lose their attempt at a three-peat when Brisbane won 5-3 on penalties in the 2023 final. In 2025 they met the Blaze in the 3rd place match, winning 10-4.

The Pride Women won their 1st and so far only championship in 2022, beating Brisbane 3-1 on penalties. Consecutive 3rd place finishes in 2024 and 2025 saw them beat Tasmania and Adelaide.

== History ==
NSW Pride, along with six other teams, was founded on 17 April 2019 as part of Hockey Australia's development of hockey.

The team's logo and colours are inspired by the New South Wales flag. The name 'Pride' is intended to evoke feelings of "community, strength and fierceness."

NSW Pride is strangely focused on its foundation as a team for the community, with many of its famous identifiers being selected by the fanbase. In May 2019, NSW Pride ran a four-week knockout style contest to select the new team's motto. Asking fans to vote via social media, the options dwindled down to two final options: 'Defend The Den' vs. 'Unleash The Beast'. The end result was a landslide with 'Unleash The Beast' winning and henceforth adopted as the team's motto.

Following the success of the Tagline Tournament, NSW Pride deployed the same tactic again in August 2019 with their Name Our Lion campaign; a chance for fans to name the new team's mascot. The contest was once again, conducted via social media with one fan winning a family membership by voting in the contest. With over 1,000 votes submitted over the four week campaign, the pride fanbase (commonly nicknamed Pride Nation) overwhelming selected 'Roary' as the team's new mascot name.

== Home Stadium ==
NSW Pride are based out of Sydney Olympic Park in New South Wales' capital city, Sydney. The stadium has a capacity of 8,000 spectators, with 4,000 fixed seats. Following the announcement of new team name, NSW Pride, the stadium has adopted the nickname The Lions Den.

== Uniforms ==
The uniform of the NSW Pride Men and Women's teams corresponds with the team's colours of gold and red. Incorporating the team's signature lion on the front and teeth marks on the socks.

The introduction of the Hockey One made history with both men and women wearing the same uniform and united under the same name for the first time in Australia's domestic hockey history.

== Performance ==
Men's Pride Results
Season	Goals For (RR)	Goals Against (RR)	Goal Difference (RR)	Wins	Shootout Wins	Shootout Loss	Loss	Points (RR)	Round-Robin Performance	Final's Performance
2019	32	5	27	6	0	0	0	30	1st (Minor Premiership)	Major Premiers (1st)
2020										

Women's Pride Results
Season	Goals For (RR)	Goals Against (RR)	Goal Difference (RR)	Wins	Shootout Wins	Shootout Loss	Loss	Points	Round-robin Performance	Final's Performance
2019	9	15	−6	1	0	0	5	5	6th	DNQ
2020										

== Teams ==
=== Men's team ===
The following players were names in the men's preliminary squad.

- Liam Alexander
- Brady Anderson
- Timothy Brand
- Tom Brown
- Berkeley-John Bruton
- Lain Carr
- Tom Craig
- Ben Craig
- Matthew Dawson
- Hayden Dillon
- Isaac Farmilo
- Matthew Fleming
- Blake Govers
- Kieran Govers
- Sam Gray
- Jack Hayes
- Ehren Hazell
- Nick Holman
- Matthew Johnson
- Sam Liles
- Kurt Lovett
- Alex Mackay
- Callum Mackay
- Dylan Martin
- Thomas Miotto
- Flynn Ogilvie
- Ryan Proctor
- Daine Richards
- Lachlan Sharp
- Nathanael Stewart
- Ash Thomas
- Rory Walker
- Tristan White
- Matthew Willis
- Ky Willott

=== Women's team ===
The following players were names in the women's preliminary squad.

No.	Pos.	Nation	Player
1	GK	AUS	Jocelyn Bartram
2	DF	AUS	Sarah Johnson
3	MF	AUS	Hannah Kable
4	MF	AUS	Kendelle Tait
6	DF	AUS	Estelle Hughes
7	FW	AUS	Grace Stewart
8	MF	AUS	Alana Kavanagh
9	GK	AUS	Zoe Newman
10	MF	AUS	Greta Hayes
11	DF	AUS	Emma Scriven
13	MF	AUS	Tamsin Bunt

No.	Pos.	Nation	Player
18	FW	AUS	Julia Bradley
19	FW	AUS	Morgan Blamey
20	DF	AUS	Maddison Smith (C)
21	FW	AUS	Alice Arnott
23	FW	AUS	Abigail Wilson
24	FW	AUS	Mariah Williams
29	FW	AUS	Courtney Schonell
30	FW	AUS	Makayla Jones
31	DF	AUS	Emma Spinks
32	MF	AUS	Grace Young
