= Hannah Cotter =

New Zealand field hockey player

Personal information
- Born: 15 July 2003 (age 23) Hastings, New Zealand

Sport
- Sport: Field hockey
- Position: Forward
Senior career
Years	Team	Caps	Goals
2022–	HC Melbourne	-	-
2025–	Rarh Bengal Tigers	-	-
2026–	Dragons	-	-
National team
Years	Team	Caps	Goals
2022–2023	New Zealand U–21	9	(2)
2023–	New Zealand	34	(7)
Medal record
Women's field hockey
Representing New Zealand
Oceania Cup
Gold medal – first place	2025 Darwin
Silver medal – second place	2023 Whangārei
FIH Nations Cup
Gold medal – first place	2024–25 Santiago
Junior Oceania Cup
Silver medal – second place	2022 Canberra

Hannah Cotter (born 15 July 2003) is a New Zealand field hockey player.

== Personal life ==
Hannah Cotter was born in Hastings and grew up in Napier, New Zealand. Her sister, Kailtin, is also a member of the Black Sticks.

== Career ==
=== Under–21 ===
Cotter made her international debut for New Zealand at Under–21 level. She represented the junior squad at the 2022 Junior Oceania Cup in Canberra, where she won a silver medal.

She has since been named in the 2023 National Junior Squad.

=== Black Sticks ===
Following a successful debut with the junior national team, Cotter made her first appearance for the Black Sticks in 2023 during a test match against Spain in Mount Maunganui. She was later added to the national squad and named in the team for season four of the FIH Pro League.

==== International goals ====
Goal	Date	Location	Opponent	Score	Result	Competition	Ref.
1	25 February 2024	National Hockey Stadium, Wellington, New Zealand	United States	3–1	4–1	2022–23 FIH Pro League	
2	26 February 2024	National Hockey Stadium, Wellington, New Zealand	China	2–3	2–5	2022–23 FIH Pro League	
3	24 June 2024	Wagener Stadium, Amsterdam, Netherlands	Netherlands	1–4	1–4	2022–23 FIH Pro League	
4	25 June 2024	Wagener Stadium, Amsterdam, Netherlands	Germany	1–1	1–3	2022–23 FIH Pro League	
5	12 August 2024	ITM Hockey Centre, Whangārei, New Zealand	Australia	1–0	1–1	2023 Oceania Cup	
6	19 January 2024	Jaipal Singh Stadium, Ranchi, India	Italy	3–1	3–1	2024 FIH Olympic Qualifiers	
7	6 June 2024	Estadi Martí Colomer, Terrassa, Spain	Canada	2–0	2–0	2023–24 FIH Nations Cup	
