= Georgina West =

Australian field hockey player (born 2004)

Personal information
- Born: 15 June 2004 (age 22) Brisbane, Australia

Sport
- Sport: Field hockey
- Position: Midfield
Senior career
Years	Team	Caps	Goals
2022–2023	Brisbane Blaze	-	-
2024–	Canberra Chill	-	-
National team
Years	Team	Caps	Goals
2022–2025	Australia U–21	22	(2)
2026–	Australia	0	(0)
Medal record
Women's field hockey
Representing Australia
Junior Oceania Cup
Gold medal – first place	2022 Canberra
Gold medal – first place	2025 Auckland

Georgina West (born 15 June 2004) is a field hockey player from Australia.

== Personal life ==
Georgina West was born in Brisbane, Queensland.

== Career ==
=== Domestic hockey ===
West is a current scholarship holder at the ACT Academy of Sport.

Throughout her junior and senior career, she represented Kedron Wavell Hockey Club in the Hockey Queensland Premier Division. Following a move to Canberra in 2024, she began representing the North Canberra Eagles in the Hockey ACT Capital League 1.

In Hockey Australia's domestic competitions, West has represented both Queensland and the Australian Capital Territory in junior and senior national championships. In the One Active Hockey One, West has represented the Canberra Chill since 2024. She also previously represented the Brisbane Blaze.

=== Under–21 ===
Following standout performances throughout 2022, West was named in the Australian U–21 squad for the first time. She was a member of the gold medal-winning squad at the Junior Oceania Cup in Canberra.

Following her debut, West was a constant inclusion in the national junior squad, including several appearances during a test–series against Japan in the Gold Coast in 2023.

2025 was West's most successful year with the junior national team, winning the Junior Oceania Cup in Auckland, travelling to Europe to play in a Four–Nations Tournament in Germany, appearing in a test series against India in Canberra, and finishing her junior career at the 2025 FIH Junior World Cup in Santiago.

=== Hockeyroos ===
Following her standout year in 2025, West was added to the national development squad in 2026. She was named in the Hockeyroos squad for the FIH Pro League matches in Hobart, where she will make her senior international debut.
