= Mikaela Patterson =

Australian field hockey player

Personal information
- Full name: Mikaela Patterson
- Born: 28 October 1996 (age 29) Wagga Wagga, New South Wales

Sport
- Sport: Field hockey
- Position: Midfielder
- Club: Canberra Chill
National team
Years	Team	Caps	Goals
2016–	Australia U21	9	(1)
2017–	Australia	7	(0)
Medal record
Women's field hockey
Representing Australia
Junior World Cup
Bronze medal – third place	2016 Santiago	Team

Mikaela Patterson (born 28 October 1996) is an Australian field hockey player.

Patterson was part of the Australian junior national team, the 'Jillaroos', at the 2016 Junior World Cup where the team won bronze.

In 2017, Patterson made her senior international debut for Australia in a test series against Japan in Adelaide, South Australia.

As of May 2018, Patterson is a member of the Australian women's national development squad.
