= Claire Colwill =

Australian field hockey player (born 2003)

Personal information
- Full name: Claire Monique Colwill
- Born: 19 September 2003 (age 23) Mackay, Queensland, Australia

Sport
- Sport: Field hockey
- Position: Midfield and Defence
Senior career
| Years | Team | Caps | Goals |
| 2019–2025 | Brisbane Blaze | 29 | 1 |
| 2026– | Melbourne Cobras | 2 | 2 |
National team
| Years | Team | Caps | Goals |
| 2020–2023 | Australia U–21 | 9 | (0) |
| 2022– | Australia | 101 | (13) |
Medal record
Women's field hockey
Representing Australia
World Cup
| Bronze medal – third place | 2022 Terrassa–Amstelveen | Team |
Commonwealth Games
| Silver medal – second place | 2022 Birmingham | Team |
Oceania Cup
| Gold medal – first place | 2023 Whangārei | Team |
| Silver medal – second place | 2025 Darwin | Team |
FIH Pro League
| Bronze medal – third place | Season Four | Team |

Claire Monique Colwill (born 19 September 2003) is an Australia field hockey player, who plays as a midfielder and defender.

== Personal life ==
Claire Colwill was born and raised in Mackay, Queensland.

== Career ==
=== Domestic league ===
In 2019, Colwill was a member of the Brisbane Blaze squad for the inaugural season of the Sultana Bran Hockey One League.

=== National teams ===
==== Under–21 ====
Claire Colwill made her debut for the Australia U–21 team in 2020 during a test series against Japan in Canberra.

==== Hockeyroos ====
Colwill was named in the Hockeyroos squad for the first time in 2022, after impressing at a series of selection camps. She made her senior international debut in May that year, during the Trans–Tasman Hockey Series in Auckland.

=== International goals ===
| Goal | Date | Location | Opponent | Score | Result | Competition | Ref. |
|---|---|---|---|---|---|---|---|
| 1 | 30 July 2022 | University of Birmingham, Birmingham, England | Kenya | 5–0 | 8–0 | 2022 Commonwealth Games | |
| 2 | 4 March 2023 | Tasmanian Hockey Centre, Hobart, Australia | United States | 1–0 | 2–1 | 2022–23 FIH Pro League | |
| 3 | 10 August 2023 | ITM Hockey Centre, Whangārei, New Zealand | New Zealand | 1–0 | 3–0 | 2023 Oceania Cup | |
| 4 | 15 February 2024 | Birsa Munda International Hockey Stadium, Rourkela, India | United States | 4–0 | 4–0 | 2023–24 FIH Pro League | |
| 5 | 24 April 2024 | Perth Hockey Stadium, Perth, Australia | Japan | 1–0 | 3–0 | 2024 International Festival of Hockey | |
| 6 | 6 February 2025 | Sydney Olympic Park, Sydney, Australia | China | 1–0 | 2–2 | 2024–25 FIH Pro League | |
| 7 | 7 March 2026 | Estadio Nacional del Hockey Césped Claudia Schüler, Santiago, Chile | Ireland | 1–0 | 1–0 | 2026 FIH World Cup Qualifiers | |
| 8 | 20 June 2026 | Lee Valley Hockey and Tennis Centre, London, England | England | 1–0 | 3–0 | 2025–26 FIH Pro League | |
| 9 | 20 June 2026 | Lee Valley Hockey and Tennis Centre, London, England | England | 3–0 | 3–0 | 2025–26 FIH Pro League | |
| 10 | 27 June 2026 | Belfius Hockey Arena, Wavre, Belgium | Netherlands | 1–1 | 1–1 | 2025–26 FIH Pro League | |
| 11 | 15 August 2026 | Wagener Stadium, Amsterdam, Netherlands | Japan | 1–0 | 2–0 | 2026 FIH World Cup | |
| 12 | 15 August 2026 | Wagener Stadium, Amsterdam, Netherlands | Japan | 2–0 | 2–0 | 2026 FIH World Cup | |
| 13 | 19 August 2026 | Wagener Stadium, Amsterdam, Netherlands | Chile | 3–2 | 4–4 | 2026 FIH World Cup | |
