= Maddison Brooks =

Australian field hockey player (born 2004)

Personal information
- Born: 23 September 2004 (age 22) Hobart, Tasmania

Sport
- Sport: Field hockey
- Position: Midfield
Senior career
Years	Team	Caps	Goals
2022–	Tassie Tigers	-	-
National team
Years	Team	Caps	Goals
2022–	Australia U–21	8	(1)
2023–	Australia	32	(6)
Medal record
Women's field hockey
Representing Australia
FIH Pro League
Bronze medal – third place	Season Four	Team
Junior Oceania Cup
Gold medal – first place	2022 Canberra	Team

Maddison Brooks (born 23 September 2004) is a field hockey player from Australia.

== Personal life ==
Maddison Brooks was born and raised in Hobart, Tasmania. She comes from a hockey family, with her mother and twin sister both representing Tasmania at a senior level. Brooks completed a Bachelor of Business (Sports Management) at Deakin University.

== Career ==
=== Domestic league ===
In Hockey Australia's domestic league, the Sultana Bran Hockey One, Brooks is a member of the Tassie Tigers.

=== Under–21 ===
Brooks made her junior international debut in 2022 at the Junior Oceania Cup in Canberra. She was a member of the Jillaroos squad that won gold.

=== Hockeyroos ===
In 2023, Brooks was selected to make her debut for the Hockeyroos during the FIH Pro League matches. She made her official debut on 28 February 2023 against Argentina, where the team came away with a 2–0 win.

==== International goals ====
Goal	Date	Location	Opponent	Score	Result	Competition	Ref.
1	25 April 2023	Ngā Puna Wai Sports Hub, Christchurch, New Zealand	New Zealand	1–1	2–1	2022–23 FIH Pro League	
2	21 May 2023	MATE Stadium, Adelaide, Australia	India	1–0	1–1	Test Match	
3	11 June 2023	HC Oranje-Rood, Eindhoven, Netherlands	Netherlands	3–2	3–3 (2–1)	2022–23 FIH Pro League	
4	15 February 2024	Birsa Munda International Hockey Stadium, Rourkela, India	United States	2–0	4–0	2023–24 FIH Pro League	
5	24 April 2024	Perth Hockey Stadium, Perth, Australia	China	2–1	2–3	2024 International Festival of Hockey	
6	28 April 2024	Perth Hockey Stadium, Perth, Australia	Japan	3–0	3–0	2024 International Festival of Hockey	
