= Zali Ward =

Australian field hockey player (born 2003)

Personal information
- Born: 18 June 2003 (age 23) Darley, Australia

Sport
- Sport: Field hockey
- Position: Forward
Senior career
Years	Team	Caps	Goals
2014–2016	Melton HC	58	16
2017–	Essendon HC	148	30
2022–	HC Melbourne	20	1
National team
Years	Team	Caps	Goals
2022–2023	Australia U–21	7	(0)
2026–	Australia	3	(0)
Medal record
Women's field hockey
Representing Australia
Junior Oceania Cup
Gold medal – first place	2022 Canberra

Zali Ward (born 18 June 2003) is a field hockey player from Australia.

== Personal life ==
Ward was born and raised in Darley, a small town north-west of Melbourne.

She is a scholarship holder at the Victorian Institute of Sport.

== Career ==
=== Domestic hockey ===
Ward plays her domestic hockey in Melbourne for Essendon Hockey Club. She represents the side in the Victorian Premier League, where she has been a member of the team since 2017.

At state level, Ward competes in the ONE Active Hockey One League for HC Melbourne.

=== Under–21 ===
In 2022 Ward made her debut for the Australian U–21 team, the Jillaroos. She was a member of the gold medal winning squad at the Junior Oceania Cup in Canberra. She made her final appearances for the junior squad the following year during a test series against Japan held on the Gold Coast.

=== Hockeyroos ===
She made her senior international debut in 2026, being called into the national squad for the FIH Pro League. She earned her first cap in a match against China in Hobart.
