= Tatum Stewart =

Australian field hockey player

Personal information
- Born: 22 February 2002 (age 24) Toowoomba, Queensland, Australia

Sport
- Sport: Field hockey
- Position: Defender
Senior career
Years	Team	Caps	Goals
2022–	Brisbane Blaze	-	-
National team
Years	Team	Caps	Goals
2022–2023	Australia U–21	9	(8)
2023–	Australia	28	(6)
Medal record
Women's field hockey
Representing Australia
FIH Pro League
Bronze medal – third place	Season Four	Team
Oceania Cup
Gold medal – first place	2023 Whangārei	Team
Junior Oceania Cup
Gold medal – first place	2022 Canberra	Team

Tatum Stewart (born 22 February 2002) is an Australian field hockey player.

== Personal life ==
Tatum Stewart was born and raised in Toowoomba, Queensland.

Stewart was a student at Fairholme College.

== Career ==
=== Domestic league ===
In Hockey Australia's domestic league, the Sultana Bran Hockey One, Stewart is a member of the Brisbane Blaze.

=== Under–21 ===
Tatum Stewart made her junior international debut in 2022 at the Junior Oceania Cup in Canberra. She was a member of the Jillaroos squad that won gold.

=== Hockeyroos ===
In 2023, Stewart was named in the Hockeyroos squad for the first time. She will make her debut during season three of the FIH Pro League.

==== International goals ====
Goal	Date	Location	Opponent	Score	Result	Competition	Ref.
1	20 May 2023	MATE Stadium, Adelaide, Australia	India	1–0	3–2	Test Match	
2	20 May 2023	MATE Stadium, Adelaide, Australia	India	3–2	3–2	Test Match	
3	6 February 2024	Kalinga Stadium, Bhubaneswar, India	United States	1–0	3–0	2023–24 FIH Pro League	
4	7 February 2024	Kalinga Stadium, Bhubaneswar, India	India	2–0	3–0	2023–24 FIH Pro League	
5	9 February 2024	Kalinga Stadium, Bhubaneswar, India	Netherlands	1–3	2–6	2023–24 FIH Pro League	
6	9 June 2024	Lee Valley Hockey Stadium, London, England	Germany	1–2	2–2	2023–24 FIH Pro League	
