= Greta Hayes (field hockey) =

Australian field hockey player

Personal information
- Born: 17 October 1996 (age 30) Maroubra, New South Wales

Sport
- Sport: Field hockey
- Position: Midfielder
- Club: NSW Arrows
National team
Years	Team	Caps	Goals
2015–2016	Australia U21	14	(3)
2018–2026	Australia	78	(5)
Medal record
Women's field hockey
Representing Australia
FIH World Cup
Bronze medal – third place	2022 Terrassa–Amsterdam	Team
Oceania Cup
Silver medal – second place	2025 Darwin
Commonwealth Games
Silver medal – second place	2022 Birmingham	Team
Champions Trophy
Silver medal – second place	2018 Changzhou	Team
FIH Junior World Cup
Bronze medal – third place	2016 Santiago	Team

Greta Hayes (born 17 October 1996) is an Australian field hockey player.

== Career ==
=== Junior National Team ===
Hayes first represented Australia's Under 21 side, the Jillaroos, at the 2016 Junior Oceania Cup. The tournament served as a qualifier for the 2016 Junior World Cup held in Chile. In October 2016, Hayes was named in the Jillaroos team for the Junior World Cup. At the tournament, Hayes scored two goals, with the team securing the bronze medal after defeating Spain in a penalty shoot-out.

=== Senior National Team ===
In 2017, Hayes was named in the Australian national development squad for the first time.

Hayes made her international debut for Australia in November 2018, at the Hockey Champions Trophy. Hayes was one of four players included in the team who were not part of Hockey Australia's centralised training program at the time.

Hayes was a member of the Hockeyroos squad at the XXXII Olympic Games in Tokyo.

She announced her retirement from international hockey in 2026 after eight years in the Hockeyroos program.

== International goals ==
The following is a list of goals scored by Hayes at international level.

Goal	Date	Location	Opponent	Score	Result	Competition	Ref.
1	5 July 2022	Estadi Olímpic de Terrassa, Terrassa, Spain	Belgium	1–0	2–0	2022 FIH World Cup	
2	21 April 2024	Perth Hockey Stadium, Perth, Australia	China	1–2	2–2	2024 International Festival of Hockey	
3	8 February 2025	Sydney Olympic Park, Sydney, Australia	Spain	2–1	3–1	2024–25 FIH Pro League	
4	18 June 2025	Lee Valley Hockey Stadium, London, United Kingdom	England	3–0	3–0	2024–25 FIH Pro League	
5	22 June 2025	Ernst-Reuter-Sportfeld, Berlin, Germany	Germany	2–3	4–3	2024–25 FIH Pro League	
