= Alana Kavanagh =

Australian field hockey player

Personal information
- Born: 24 March 2003 (age 23) Sydney

Sport
- Sport: Field hockey
- Position: Midfield
Senior career
Years	Team	Caps	Goals
2022–	NSW Pride	8	0
National team
Years	Team	Caps	Goals
2022–	Australia U–21	6	(0)
2023–	Australia	0	(0)
Medal record
Women's field hockey
Representing Australia
Junior Oceania Cup
Gold medal – first place	2022 Canberra	Team

Alana Kavanagh (born 24 March 2003) is a field hockey player from Australia, who plays as a midfielder.

== Personal life ==
Alana Kavanagh was born in Sydney, New South Wales, and grew up in West Pennant Hills.

== Career ==
=== National league ===
In Hockey Australia's national league, the Sultana Bran Hockey One League, Kavanagh represents the NSW Pride.

=== Under–21 ===
Kavanagh made her international debut in 2022 for the Australia Under–21 team. She was a member of the squad at the Junior Oceania Cup in Canberra, where she won a gold medal.

In 2023 Kavanagh was named in the Australian Under–21 team for the second time. She went on to appear in a test series against Japan in the Gold Coast in February.

=== Hockeyroos ===
Following a successful junior debut and national league season, Kavanagh was named in the national development squad for 2023. In May, she was named to make her senior international debut in a test series against India in Adelaide.
