= Grace Young (field hockey) =

Australian field hockey player (born 2002)

Personal information
- Born: 23 August 2002 (age 24) Armidale, New South Wales
- Height: 157 cm (5 ft 2 in)

Sport
- Sport: Field hockey
- Position: Midfield
Senior career
Years	Team	Caps	Goals
2022–	NSW Pride	-	-
National team
Years	Team	Caps	Goals
2018	Australia U–18	8	(2)
2023–	Australia	59	(1)
2023–2023	Australia U–21	6	(1)
Medal record
Women's field hockey
Representing Australia
Oceania Cup
Silver medal – second place	2025 Darwin	Team
FIH Pro League
Bronze medal – third place	Season Four	Team

Grace Young (born 23 August 2002) is a field hockey player from Australia.

== Personal life ==
Grace Young was born and raised in Grafton, New South Wales.

== Career ==
=== Domestic league ===
In Hockey Australia's domestic league, the Sultana Bran Hockey One, Young is a member of the NSW Pride.

=== Under–18 ===
Young made her junior international debut at the 2018 Summer Youth Olympics in Buenos Aires. She was a member of the Australian Hockey5s team that finished fifth in the girls' tournament.

=== Under–21 ===
She represented the Australia U–21 team at the 2023 FIH Junior World Cup in Santiago.

=== Hockeyroos ===
In 2023, Young was named in the Hockeyroos squad for the first time. She made her debut during the fourth season of the FIH Pro League. She earned her first senior international cap in a match against China in Sydney.

Since her debut, Young has been a constant inclusion in the Hockeyroos squad. In 2024, she represented the team at the XXXIII Olympic Games in Paris, where the side finished in fifth place.
