= Lucy Sharman =

Australian field hockey player

Personal information
- Born: 24 May 2003 (age 23) Penola, Australia

Sport
- Sport: Field hockey
- Position: Defender
Senior career
Years	Team	Caps	Goals
2022–	Adelaide Fire	-	-
National team
Years	Team	Caps	Goals
2023–2023	Australia U–21	10	(0)
2024–	Australia	39	(1)
Medal record
Women's field hockey
Representing Australia
Oceania Cup
Silver medal – second place	2025 Darwin

Lucy Sharman (born 24 May 2003) is an Australian field hockey player.

== Personal life ==
Lucy Sharman grew up in the locality of Kalangadoo in South Australia.

Sharman was a student at Pembroke School.

== Career ==
=== Domestic league ===
In Hockey Australia's domestic league, the JDH Hockey One, Sharman is a member of the Adelaide Fire.

=== Under–21 ===
Sharman made her junior international debut for the Jillaroos in 2023. She represented the team during a test series against Japan in the Gold Coast. Later that year she was selected in the squad for the FIH Junior World Cup in Santiago.

=== Hockeyroos ===
Following an outstanding year in junior competition in 2023, Sharman was named in the Hockeyroos squad for the first time. She will make her debut during season five of the FIH Pro League.
