= Queensland State Hockey Centre =

Field hockey stadium located in Brisbane, Australia

- State Hockey Centre
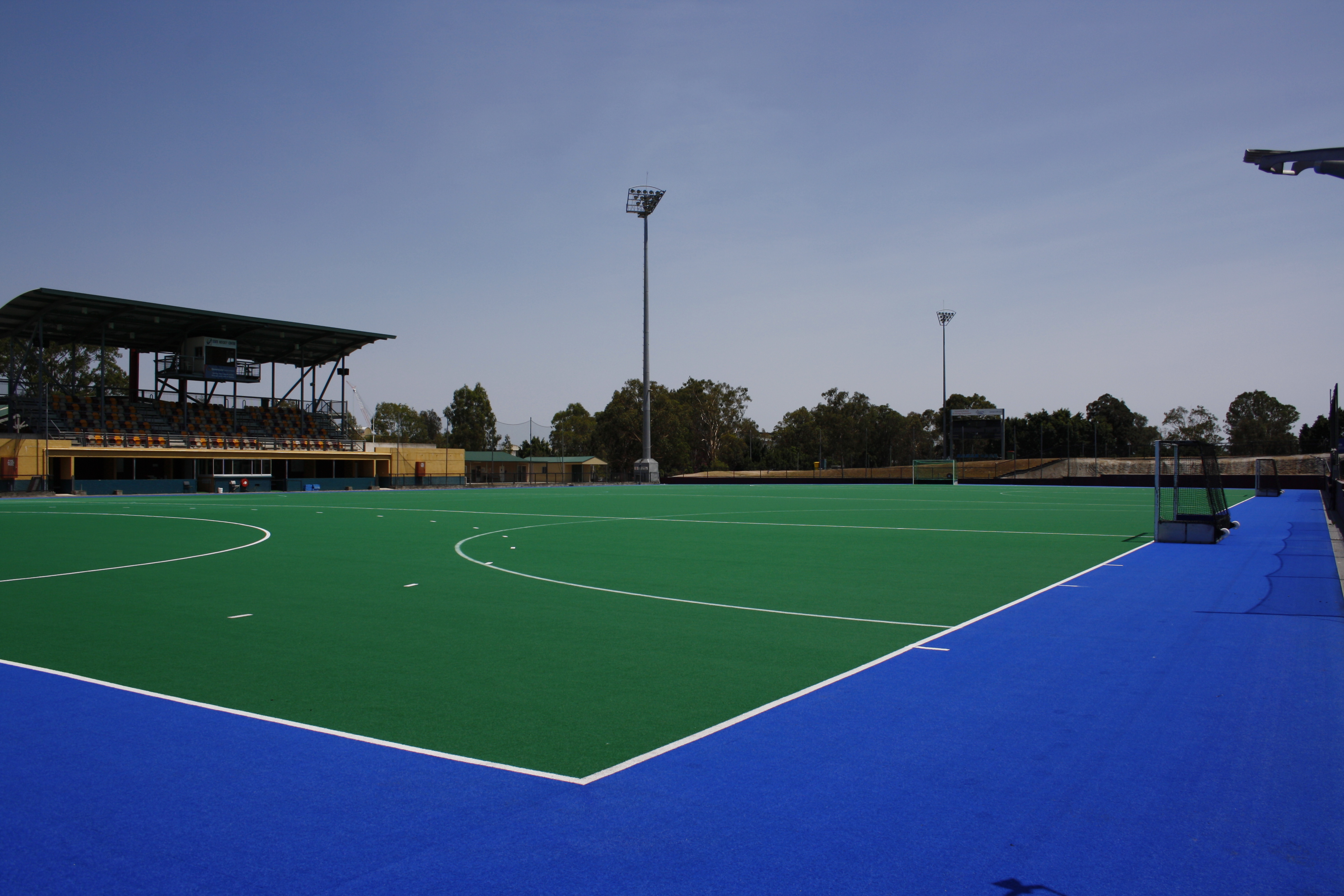
- Interactive map of Queensland State Hockey Centre
- Location: Morningside, Brisbane, QLD
- Coordinates: 27°27′7″S 153°4′57″E
- Owner: Queensland Government
- Capacity: 2,000
- Surface: Synthetic

Construction
- Opened: 1996
- Cost: A$12m

Tenant
- Brisbane Blaze (Hockey One)

Queensland State Hockey Centre is a multi-purpose stadium in Brisbane, Australia. It is currently used for field hockey and is home to the Brisbane Blaze who play in Hockey One.

== Facilities ==
The Queensland State Hockey Centre includes two international standard water based synthetic hockey fields with international standard lighting. There is a covered grandstand, an electronic scoreboard, multiple change rooms, multiple large grass playing fields with lighting, a first-aid room. Other facilities include a hockey pro-shop, a covered courtyard with seating, an external sound system and canteen facilities.

== See also ==
- Sport in Brisbane
