= Josie Lawton =

Australian field hockey player (born 2002)

Personal information
- Born: 5 October 2004 (age 21) Worthing, United Kingdom

Sport
- Sport: Field hockey
- Position: Defence
Senior career
Years	Team	Caps	Goals
2022–2024	HC Melbourne	-	-
2025–	Canberra Chill	-	-
National team
Years	Team	Caps	Goals
2022–	Australia U–21	21	(4)
Medal record
Women's field hockey
Representing Australia
Junior Oceania Cup
Gold medal – first place	2022 Canberra
Gold medal – first place	2025 Auckland

Josie Lawton (born 5 October 2004) is a field hockey player from Australia.

== Personal life ==
Josie Lawton was born in Worthing, England before relocating to Emerald, Victoria at the age of 4 with her family. Her older sister, Amy, also plays field hockey for Australia.

Lawton is a current scholarship holder at the Victorian Institute of Sport.

== Career ==
=== Domestic ===
In Hockey Australia's premier domestic league, the Liberty Hockey One, Lawton represent HC Melbourne.

=== Under 21 ===
Lawton made her debut for the Australian U–21 side, the Jillaroos, in 2022. She was a member of the gold medal-winning squad at the Junior Oceania Cup in Canberra.

She went on to represent the team again throughout 2023. She appeared during a test–series against Japan in the Gold Coast. She finished out the year with a fifth-place finish with the Jillaroos at the FIH Junior World Cup in Santiago.

In 2025, Lawton was named as one of three co–captains of the Jillaroos. In their first outing, she helped lead the team to a gold medal at her second Junior Oceania Cup in Auckland.

=== Hockeyroos ===
Lawton has been a member of the National Development Squad since 2023. She will make her senior international debut in 2025, during the Santiago del Estero leg of the 2024–25 FIH Pro League.
