= Brisbane Blaze =

Australian field hockey club

- League: Hockey One
- Founded: 17 April 2019; 7 years ago
- Home ground: Queensland Hockey Centre, Brisbane, Australia (Capacity 2,000)
- Website: www.hockeyqld.com.au

Brisbane Blaze is an Australian professional hockey club based in Brisbane, Queensland. The club was established in 2019, and is one of 7 established to compete in Hockey Australia's new premier domestic competition, Hockey One.

The club unifies both men and women under one name, unlike Queensland's former representation in the Australian Hockey League as the QLD Blade (men) and QLD Scorchers (women).

Brisbane Blaze compete in the Hockey One League, which is be contested from September through to November annually.

== History ==
Brisbane Blaze, along with six other teams, was founded on 17 April 2019 as part of Hockey Australia's development of hockey.

The team's logo and colours are inspired by the new team name, 'Blaze', which is an adaption of Queensland's former representative women's team the Scorchers. The new colours are burnt orange and yellow.

== Home Stadium ==
Brisbane Blaze are based out of Queensland Hockey Centre in Queensland's capital city, Brisbane. The stadium has a capacity of 2,000 spectators, with additional seating available.

Throughout every season of Hockey One, the both them men's and women's team play three home matches each at the stadium. In 2024, the Blaze women were undefeated at home, while the men won all bar one game at the Queensland State HC (Round 3, 0-2 loss to Canberra Chill).

== Teams ==
=== Men's team ===
The following players were names in the men's preliminary squad.

- Jacob Anderson
- Tyler Arundell
- Jayden Atkinson
- Daniel Beale
- Scott Boyde
- Lucas Brown
- Thomas Campbell
- Diarmid Chappell
- Cale Cramer
- Elliot Dale
- Noah Fahy
- Jesse Folpp
- Michael Francis
- Tyler Gaddes
- Max Harding
- Liam Hart
- Timothy Howard
- David Hubbard
- Adam Imer
- Shane Kenny
- William Mathison
- Joshua Mynott
- Mitchell Nicholson (GK)
- Hugh Pembroke
- William Powell
- Luke Randle
- Alec Rasmussen
- William Ready
- Joel Rintala
- Aaron Weiss (GK)
- Edward Westcott
- Corey Weyer
- Jacob Whetton
- Blake Wotherspoon

=== Women's team ===
The following players were names in the women's preliminary squad.

- Hannah Astbury (GK)
- Emily Baker
- Rhiannon Baxter
- Jordan Bliss (GK)
- Chelsea Bodimeade
- Claire Colwill
- Hannah Cullum-Sanders
- Casey Dolkens
- Dayle Dolkens
- Madison Fitzpatrick
- Kendra Fitzpatrick
- Savannah Fitzpatrick
- Morgan Gallagher
- Rebecca Greiner
- Ruby Harris
- Mihaylia Howell
- Jodie Kenny
- Madeline Kenny
- Stephanie Kershaw
- Emily Kingston
- Kyra Livermore
- Ambrosia Malone
- Camryn Mathison
- Morgan Mathison
- Jemma Punch
- Jade Reid
- Jade Smith
- Tatum Stewart
- Briana Suey
- Renee Taylor
- Karissa van der Wath
- Keeley Walker
- Georgina West
- Britt Wilkinson
- Emily Witheyman-Crump (GK)
