= 2026 Women's Hockey One =

Hockey Australia's national league, fourth season

Tournament details
- Host country: Australia
- Dates: 8 October – 6 December
- Teams: 8
- Venue: 10 (in 10 host cities)

Tournament statistics
- Matches played: 28
- Goals scored: 136 (4.86 per match)
- Top scorer(s): (Victoria (state)) Zara Geddis (MCO) (Western Australia) Courtney Schonell (7 goals)

The 2026 Women's Hockey One is the sixth season of Hockey Australia's national league, Hockey One. The tournament is held across seven states and territories of Australia. Competition commenced on 8 October and will culminate with the finals weekend on 5–6 December.

This season features the introduction of an eighth franchise, the Melbourne Cobras.

== Competition format ==
=== Format ===
The 2026 Hockey One season followed the same format as the previous seasons of the league. Teams will play a series of home and away matches during the Pool Stage, which will be followed by a Classification Round.

During the pool stage, teams played each other once in either a home or a way fixture. The top four ranked teams qualified for the medal round, playing in two semi-finals with the winners contesting the final and losers the third place match.

=== Rules ===
In addition to FIH sanctioned rules, Hockey Australia is implementing the following rules for Hockey One:

- When a field goal or penalty stroke is scored the same athlete will have an automatic one-on-one shootout with the goalkeeper for an extra goal.
- Outright winner: There will be no drawn games. In the event of a draw, teams will contest a penalty shoot-out to determine a winner.

=== Point allocation ===
Match points will be distributed as follows:

- 3 points: win
- 2 points: shoot-out win
- 1 points: shoot-out loss
- 0 points: loss

== Participating teams ==
The eight teams competing in the league come from Australia's states and territories, with the Northern Territory being the only team absent.

(South Australia) Adelaide Fire
1. Georgina Dowd
2. Ella Bruce
3. Emma Kitto
4. Chloe Holland
5. Eliza Gray
6. Bree Pendrigh
7. Linzi Appleyard
8. Michaela Spano (C)
9. Caitlin Muir
10. Zara Pelham
11. Amelia Lucas
12. Iris Langejans
14. Annelise Abbott
15. Harriet Tyrer
16. Adele Parkin
18. Katie Sharkey
19. Aleisha Power (GK)
20. Cis van der Salm
21. Amy Hammond (GK)
22. Eliza White
23. Madison Naish
24. Emily Barnes
25. Anke Sanders
29. Eliza Pannell
38. Emily Cochrane (GK)
99. Katie Blackmore (GK)
(Queensland) Brisbane Blaze

Head coach: Angela Lambert

2. Kara Bradley
3. Kendra Fitzpatrick
4. Montana Carr
5. Sophie Davis
6. Camryn Mathison
7. Hannah Cullum-Sanders
8. Dayle Dolkens
9. Casey Dolkens (C)
10. Ambrosia Malone
11. Morgan Mathison
13. Karissa van der Wath
14. Stephanie Kershaw
15. Jade Reid
16. Jordn Office
17. Aurora Kovacevich
18. Madeline Kenny
19. Phoebe Nixon
20. Jamie-Lee Surha
21. Sara Strauss
22. Tatum Stewart
23. Ruby Harris
24. Ella White
25. Kyra Livermore
32. Emily Witheyman-Crump (GK)
88. Jordan Bliss (GK)
(Australian Capital Territory) Canberra Chill
1. Mikayla Evans
2. Valentina Costa
3. Maya McGrath
4. Ashleigh Seivers
5. Zara Seivers
6. Josie Lawton
7. Naomi Evans (C)
8. Lynn Krings
10. Georgina West
11. Paulina Niklaus
12. Taquira McGrath
13. Mabel Brands (C)
14. Lucinda Nash
15. Imogen Dorsett
16. Georgie Smithers (C)
17. Layla Riley
18. Ruby Worrall
19. Hunter Baldwin
20. Ellie Baldwin
21. Mikaela Patterson
24. Tess Palubski
25. Lauren Yee
27. Alyssa Smith (GK)
29. Madeline Dooley
30. Gabrielle Millan (GK)
(Victoria (state)) HC Melbourne
1. Sophie Murphy (C)
2. Juliette Sheriff
3. Mihaylia Howell
4. Miri Maroney
5. Kristina Bates
6. Olivia Colasurdo
8. Lourdes Pérez (GK)
9. Daisy Caink (GK)
10. Emily Hamilton-Smith
11. Chloe Fader
12. Greta Hayes
13. Rebecca Greiner
14. Laura Barden
15. Olivia Downes
16. Bridget Laurance (GK)
17. Candelaria Wortley
18. Eva van 't Hoog
20. Zali Ward
22. Lisa Lejeune
23. Ashley Hoffman
24. Summer Tancred
25. Hannah Gravenall (C)
29. Samantha Love
30. Bianca Zurrer
31. Evie Stansby
99. Manisha Arunasalam
(Victoria (state)) Melbourne Cobras

Head Coach: David John

1. Claire Colwill (C)
2. Emma Leighton (GK)
3. Jemma Ryan
4. Charlotte Hodgson
5. Sonika Tandi
6. Mahima Chaudhary
7. Ella Carr
8. Alannah Hibbard
9. Delfina Thome
10. Rosario Villagra
11. Trinity Woodward
12. Madison Fitzpatrick
13. Kanika Siwach
14. Anna Moore
15. Gracie Geddis
16. Zara Geddis
17. Udita Duhan
20. Lily Lloyd
21. Jennifer Rizzo (GK)
23. Maya Hilford
24. Lahni Woodger
25. Aimee Jungfer
27. Lulu Olesen
32. Hayley Carter
99. Ajmina Kujur
(New South Wales) NSW Pride
1. Lola Dorman
2. Claudia Johnston
3. Chloe Holmes
5. Chelsea Holmes
6. Jenna-Rae McIntyre
7. Grace Stewart
8. Makayla Jones
9. Amalia Patterson
10. Laura Reid
11. Alice Arnott
12. Lily Neilson
13. Sarah Steinhardt (GK)
14. Emmalee Croker
16. Alana Kavanagh
17. Lucinda Preeo
18. Bella Croker
19. Jocelyn Bartram (GK)
20. Maddison Smith
21. Kalahni Crews
22. Grace Jones
23. Abigail Wilson
24. Mariah Williams (C)
25. Eliza Berrick
26. Annelise Cullen
27. Kendelle Tait
(Western Australia) Perth Thundersticks

Head Coach: Anthony Potter

1. Phillipa Morgan
2. Jolie Sertorio
3. Neasa Flynn
4. Madeleine Ratcliffe
5. Courtney Schonell
6. Sarah Byrnes
7. Emma Reid
8. Jaeda Ritchie
9. Georgia Hiskins
10. Jesse Reid
11. Bella Connelly
12. Liné Malan (C)
13. Caitlyn Templeman
14. Saysha Pillay
15. Bellé Ramshaw
16. Elyssa Melville
17. Annie Gibbs
18. Sophie Nation
19. Beatrice Bell
20. Karri Somerville
24. Britney DeSilva
26. Lexie Pickering
27. Summer Greenway (GK)
28. Georgia Wilson
29. Camila Vaughan (GK)
(Tasmania) Tassie Tigers
1. Kacee Pointing (GK)
2. Holly Pearson
3. Phillida Bridley
4. Hannah Baxter
5. Zayna Jackson
6. Lauren Canning
7. Taylor Brooks
8. Maddison Brooks (C)
9. Georgina Carter
10. Isabelle Kruimink
11. Jade van der Zwan
12. Sophie Kruimink
14. Stella Pritchard
15. Penny Squibb (C)
16. Madison Clark
17. Paige Blake
18. Sophia Schwabe
19. Bryn Underwood (GK)
20. Beth Dobbie
21. Yvette Beikart
22. Meah Poke
23. Holly Gilbar
24. Camila Raposo
25. Evelyn Dalton (GK)
26. Lucy Cooper

== Venues ==
Adelaide
State Hockey Centre
Bendigo
Bendigo Hockey Centre
Brisbane
Queensland State Hockey Centre
Canberra
EPC Solar Hockey Stadium
Gold Coast
Gold Coast Hockey Centre
Hobart
Aurora Energy Tasmanian Hockey Centre
Melbourne
State Sports Centres
Newcastle
Newcastle International Hockey Centre
Sydney
Sydney Olympic Park
Perth
Perth Hockey Stadium

== Preliminary round ==
=== Standings ===
Pos	Team	Pld	W	WD	LD	L	GF	GA	GD	Pts	Qualification
1	(Western Australia) Perth Thundersticks	7	6	0	0	1	21	12	+9	18	Semi-finals
2	(Victoria (state)) HC Melbourne	7	5	0	1	1	18	8	+10	16	Semi-finals
3	(New South Wales) NSW Pride	7	4	1	0	2	21	10	+11	14	Semi-finals
4	(Victoria (state)) Melbourne Cobras	7	4	0	0	3	16	20	−4	12	Semi-finals
5	(Queensland) Brisbane Blaze	7	3	1	0	3	20	10	+10	11	
6	(Australian Capital Territory) Canberra Chill	7	3	0	0	4	17	18	−1	9	
7	(Tasmania) Tassie Tigers	7	1	0	1	5	15	24	−9	4	
8	(South Australia) Adelaide Fire	7	0	0	0	7	8	34	−26	0	

Source: Hockey Australia
Rules for classification: 1) points; 2) matches won; 3) goal difference; 4) goals for; 5) head-to-head result; 6) field goals scored.

=== Fixtures ===
8 October 2026
18:00 (AEDT)

Canberra Chill (Australian Capital Territory)	7–3	(South Australia) Adelaide Fire
N. Evans 3', 3'; Krings 5', 5', 59'; Brands 24', 24'	Report	Dowd 33'; Bruce 35'; Kitto 40'

EPC Solar Hockey Stadium, Canberra
Umpires:
Emily Carroll (AUS)
Niamh Blake (AUS)

9 October 2026
18:30 (AEST)

Brisbane Blaze (Queensland)	2–3	(Victoria (state)) HC Melbourne
Kenny 6'; Stewart 39'	Report	Maroney 26', 26'; Lejeune 58'

Queensland State Hockey Centre, Brisbane
Umpires:
Tamara Wood (AUS)
Hayden Newell (AUS)

10 October 2026
14:30 (AEDT)

Tassie Tigers (Tasmania)	0–3	(Western Australia) Perth Thundersticks
	Report	Sertorio 16'; Schonell 32', 55'

Aurora Energy Tasmanian Hockey Centre, Hobart
Umpires:
Vincent Harman (AUS)
Lachlan Avil (AUS)

11 October 2026
14:30 (AEDT)

Melbourne Cobras (Victoria (state))	5–4	(New South Wales) NSW Pride
Z. Geddis 20', 20'; Woodger 43', 43'; Colwill 56'	Report	Stewart 36', 36', 49', 49'

State Sport Centres, Melbourne
Umpires:
Iris Milham (AUS)
Lachlan Robinson (AUS)

16 October 2026
20:15 (AEDT)

NSW Pride (New South Wales)	3–0	(Queensland) Brisbane Blaze
Patterson 22', 22'; Wilson 50'	Report

Newcastle International Hockey Centre, Newcastle
Umpires:
Harrison Lye (AUS)
Cassidy Gallagher (AUS)

17 October 2026
14:45 (AEDT)

HC Melbourne (Victoria (state))	1–3	(Western Australia) Perth Thundersticks
Murphy 12'	Report	Ratcliffe 3'; Flynn 36'; Schonell 36'

State Sport Centres, Melbourne
Umpires:
Nathan McDonald (AUS)
Lachlan Robinson (AUS)

17 October 2026
18:45 (AEDT)

Melbourne Cobras (Victoria (state))	3–1	(Australian Capital Territory) Canberra Chill
Z. Geddis 27'; Mahima 30'; Colwill 58'	Report	Costa 35'

State Sport Centres, Melbourne
Umpires:
Iris Milham (AUS)
Chloe Scott (AUS)

18 October 2026
14:45 (ACDT)

Adelaide Fire (South Australia)	1–5	(Tasmania) Tassie Tigers
Pannell 48'	Report	Raposo 18', 18'; Squibb 20'; Dobbie 55', 55'

State Hockey Centre, Adelaide
Umpires:
Emily Carroll (AUS)
Niamh Blake (AUS)

23 October 2026
19:45 (AEDT)

Tassie Tigers (Tasmania)	2–4	(Australian Capital Territory) Canberra Chill
Squibb 29', 36'	Report	M. McGrath 22'; Costa 44', 51'; Krings 45+'

Aurora Energy Tasmanian Hockey Centre, Hobart
Umpires:
Harrison Winch (AUS)
Nathan McDonald (AUS)

24 October 2026
14:45 (AEDT)

NSW Pride (New South Wales)	2–3	(Western Australia) Perth Thundersticks
Wilson 21'; Tait 45'	Report	Schonell 14', 14'; Ratcliffe 42'

Sydney Olympic Park, Sydney
Umpires:
Harrison Lye (AUS)
Cassidy Gallagher (AUS)

24 October 2026
17:45 (AEST)

Brisbane Blaze (Queensland)	3–0	(South Australia) Adelaide Fire
Malone 20'; Surha 47'; Strauss 58'	Report

Queensland State Hockey Centre, Brisbane
Umpires:
Aleisha Neumann (AUS)
Tamara Wood (AUS)

25 October 2026
15:30 (AEDT)

Melbourne Cobras (Victoria (state))	1–2	(Victoria (state)) HC Melbourne
Woodger 23'	Report	Howell 49', 49'

State Sport Centres, Melbourne
Umpires:
Chloe Scott (AUS)
Lachlan Avil (AUS)

30 October 2026
19:45 (AEDT)

Canberra Chill (Australian Capital Territory)	0–2	(Victoria (state)) HC Melbourne
	Report	Ward 17'; Murphy 37'

EPC Solar Hockey Stadium, Canberra
Umpires:
Niamh Blake (AUS)
Toby Power (AUS)

31 October 2026
13:00 (AEDT)

Tassie Tigers (Tasmania)	3–3	(Queensland) Brisbane Blaze
Pearson 39', 39'; Biekart 57'	Report	Kershaw 26'; Malone 49', 49'
Penalties
Bridley (penalty shoot-out missed); Schwabe (penalty shoot-out missed); Pearson (penalty shoot-out missed); Van der Zwan (penalty shoot-out missed)	0–2	(penalty shoot-out missed) Kershaw; (penalty shoot-out missed) Kovacevich; (penalty shoot-out scored) Strauss; (penalty shoot-out scored) Malone

Aurora Energy Tasmanian Hockey Centre, Hobart
Umpires:
Harrison Winch (AUS)
Chloe Scott (AUS)

31 October 2026
17:30 (ACDT)

Adelaide Fire (South Australia)	0–7	(New South Wales) NSW Pride
	Report	Smith 30'; M. Jones 37', 54', 54'; Patterson 38', 60'; McIntyre 58'

State Hockey Centre, Adelaide
Umpires:
Cassidy Gallagher (AUS)
Iris Milham (AUS)

1 November 2026
14:00 (AWST)

Perth Thundersticks (Western Australia)	4–0	(Victoria (state)) Melbourne Cobras
Malan 22', 33'; Byrnes 60', 60'	Report

Perth Hockey Stadium, Perth
Umpires:
Jaxon Geddes (AUS)
Ruby Guilfoyle (AUS)

6 November 2026
20:15 (AEDT)

HC Melbourne (Victoria (state))	6–1	(Tasmania) Tassie Tigers
Barden 3'; Ward 15', 15'; Howell 21', 21', 31'	Report	Squibb 7'

State Sport Centres, Melbourne
Umpires:
Iris Milham (AUS)
Lachlan Avil (AUS)

7 November 2026
13:00 (AEDT)

NSW Pride (New South Wales)	2–0	(Australian Capital Territory) Canberra Chill
Wilson 20'; Patterson 21'	Report

Sydney Olympic Park, Sydney
Umpires:
Kristy Robertson (AUS)
Cassidy Gallagher (AUS)

7 November 2026
14:30 (AWST)

Perth Thundersticks (Western Australia)	1–0	(Queensland) Brisbane Blaze
Sertorio 55'	Report

Perth Hockey Stadium, Perth
Umpires:
Blake Kroning (AUS)
Ruby Guilfoyle (AUS)

8 November 2026
13:00 (AEDT)

Melbourne Cobras (Victoria (state))	2–0	(South Australia) Adelaide Fire
Colwill 19'; Thome 44'	Report

Bendigo Hockey Centre, Bendigo
Umpires:
Chloe Scott (AUS)
Nicola Brown (AUS)

13 November 2026
18:30 (AEDT)

HC Melbourne (Victoria (state))	1–1	(New South Wales) NSW Pride
Greiner 60'	Report	Arnott 11'
Penalties
Bates (penalty shoot-out missed); Ward (penalty shoot-out missed); Love (penalty shoot-out scored); Howell (penalty shoot-out missed)	1–3	(penalty shoot-out scored) Arnott; (penalty shoot-out scored) Williams; (penalty shoot-out scored) Kavanagh

State Sport Centres, Melbourne
Umpires:
Iris Milham (AUS)
Nicola Brown (AUS)

14 November 2026
14:45 (AEDT)

Tassie Tigers (Tasmania)	3–5	(Victoria (state)) Melbourne Cobras
Bridley 17'; Pearson 58', 58'	Report	Colwill 7'; Z. Geddis 10', 10', 60', 60'

Aurora Energy Tasmanian Hockey Centre, Hobart
Umpires:
Harrison Winch (AUS)
Vincent Harman (AUS)

14 November 2026
17:15 (AWST)

Perth Thundersticks (Western Australia)	7–4	(South Australia) Adelaide Fire
Ratcliffe 4', 4', 45'; Schonell 12', 51'; Gibbs 52', 52'	Report	Spano 26', 26'; Langejans 58'; Naish 58'

Perth Hockey Stadium, Perth
Umpires:
Chloe Scott (AUS)
Ruby Guilfoyle (AUS)

15 November 2026
14:00 (AEST)

Brisbane Blaze (Queensland)	6–0	(Australian Capital Territory) Canberra Chill
Fitzpatrick 13', 13'; Carr 18'; Strauss 26', 26'; Cullum-Sanders 46'	Report

Queensland State Hockey Centre, Brisbane
Umpires:
Tamara Wood (AUS)
Abby Heffernan (AUS)

20 November 2026
20:15 (AEDT)

NSW Pride (New South Wales)	2–1	(Tasmania) Tassie Tigers
Wilson 11'; McIntyre 31'	Report	Bridley 20'

Newcastle International Hockey Centre, Newcastle
Umpires:
Sarah Willis (AUS)
Cassidy Gallagher (AUS)

21 November 2026
14:30 (ACDT)

Adelaide Fire (South Australia)	0–3	(Victoria (state)) HC Melbourne
	Report	Greiner 7', 7'; Murphy 8'

State Hockey Centre, Adelaide
Umpires:
Nicola Brown (AUS)
Nathan McDonald (AUS)

21 November 2026
19:45 (AEST)

Brisbane Blaze (Queensland)	6–0	(Victoria (state)) Melbourne Cobras
C. Mathison 9'; Kershaw 34', 34', 58', 58'; Surha 46'	Report

Queensland State Hockey Centre, Brisbane
Umpires:
Tamara Wood (AUS)
Abby Heffernan (AUS)

22 November 2026
13:00 (AEDT)

Canberra Chill (Australian Capital Territory)	5–0	(Western Australia) Perth Thundersticks
E. Baldwin 6', 6'; Costa 8'; N. Evans 28', 47'	Report

EPC Solar Hockey Stadium, Canberra
Umpires:
Emily Carroll (AUS)
Niamh Blake (AUS)

== Medal round ==
=== Bracket ===
Semi-finals
5 December
(Western Australia) Perth Thundersticks
(Victoria (state)) Melbourne Cobras
5 December
(Victoria (state)) HC Melbourne
(New South Wales) NSW Pride

Final
6 December
Winner SF1
Winner SF2
Third place
6 December
Loser SF1
Loser SF2

=== Semi-finals ===
5 December 2026
11:45

Perth Thundersticks (Western Australia)	v	(Victoria (state)) Melbourne Cobras
	Report

Gold Coast Hockey Centre, Gold Coast

5 December 2026
15:15

HC Melbourne (Victoria (state))	v	(New South Wales) NSW Pride
	Report

Gold Coast Hockey Centre, Gold Coast

=== Third and fourth place ===
6 December 2026
17:00

Loser SF1	v	Loser SF2
	Report

Gold Coast Hockey Centre, Gold Coast

=== Final ===
6 December 2026
12:45

Winner SF1	v	Winner SF2
	Report

Gold Coast Hockey Centre, Gold Coast

== Goalscorers ==
There have been 136 goals scored in 28 matches, for an average of 4.86 goals per match (as of 22 November 2026).

7 goals

- (Victoria (state)) Zara Geddis (MCO)
- (Western Australia) Courtney Schonell

5 goals

- (Queensland) Stephanie Kershaw
- (Victoria (state)) Mihaylia Howell (HCM)
- (New South Wales) Amalia Patterson
- (Western Australia) Madeleine Ratcliffe

4 goals

- (Australian Capital Territory) Valentina Costa
- (Australian Capital Territory) Naomi Evans
- (Australian Capital Territory) Lynn Krings
- (Victoria (state)) Claire Colwill (MCO)
- (New South Wales) Grace Stewart
- (New South Wales) Abigail Wilson
- (Tasmania) Holly Pearson
- (Tasmania) Penny Squibb

3 goals

- (Queensland) Ambrosia Malone
- (Queensland) Sara Strauss
- (Victoria (state)) Rebecca Greiner (HCM)
- (Victoria (state)) Sophie Murphy (HCM)
- (Victoria (state)) Zali Ward (HCM)
- (Victoria (state)) Lahni Woodger (MCO)
- (New South Wales) Makayla Jones

2 goals

- (South Australia) Michaela Spano
- (Queensland) Kendra Fitzpatrick
- (Queensland) Jamie-Lee Surha
- (Australian Capital Territory) Ellie Baldwin
- (Australian Capital Territory) Mabel Brands
- (Victoria (state)) Miri Maroney (HCM)
- (New South Wales) Jenna-Rae McIntyre
- (Western Australia) Sarah Byrnes
- (Western Australia) Annie Gibbs
- (Western Australia) Liné Malan
- (Western Australia) Jolie Sertorio
- (Tasmania) Phillida Bridley
- (Tasmania) Beth Dobbie
- (Tasmania) Camila Raposo

1 goal

- (South Australia) Ella Bruce
- (South Australia) Georgina Dowd
- (South Australia) Emma Kitto
- (South Australia) Iris Langejans
- (South Australia) Madison Naish
- (South Australia) Eliza Pannell
- (Queensland) Montana Carr
- (Queensland) Hannah Cullum-Sanders
- (Queensland) Madeline Kenny
- (Queensland) Camryn Mathison
- (Queensland) Tatum Stewart
- (Australian Capital Territory) Maya McGrath
- (Victoria (state)) Laura Barden (HCM)
- (Victoria (state)) Lisa Lejeune (HCM)
- (Victoria (state)) Mahima Choudhary (MCO)
- (Victoria (state)) Delfina Thome (MCO)
- (New South Wales) Alice Arnott
- (New South Wales) Maddison Smith
- (New South Wales) Kendelle Tait
- (Western Australia) Neasa Flynn
- (Tasmania) Yvette Biekart

Source: Hockey Australia
