= 2024 Women's Hockey One =

Hockey Australia's national league, fourth season

2024 Women's Liberty Hockey One
Tournament details
- Host country: Australia
- Dates: 11 October – 1 December
- Teams: 7
- Venue: 9 (in 9 host cities)

Final positions
- Champions: (Western Australia) Perth Thundersticks (1st title)
- Runner-up: (Queensland) Brisbane Blaze
- Third place: (New South Wales) NSW Pride

Tournament statistics
- Matches played: 25
- Goals scored: 145 (5.8 per match)
- Top scorer: (Western Australia) Lexie Pickering (13 goals)
- Best player: (Tasmania) Gitte Michels

The 2024 Women's Liberty Hockey One was the fourth season of Hockey Australia's national league, Hockey One. The tournament was held across 7 states and territories of Australia. Competition commenced on 11 October, and culminated with a finals weekend in Hobart, from 30 November to 1 December.

== Competition format ==
=== Format ===
The 2024 Hockey One season followed the same format as the previous seasons of the league. Teams will play a series of home and away matches during the Pool Stage, which will be followed by a Classification Round.

During the pool stage, teams played each other once in either a home or a way fixture. The top four ranked teams qualified for the classification round, playing in two semi-finals with the winners contesting the final and losers the third place match.

=== Rules ===
In addition to FIH sanctioned rules, Hockey Australia is implementing the following rules for Hockey One:

- When a field goal or penalty stroke is scored the same athlete will have an automatic one-on-one shootout with the goalkeeper for an extra goal.
- Outright winner: There will be no drawn games. In the event of a draw, teams will contest a penalty shoot-out to determine a winner.

=== Point allocation ===
Match points will be distributed as follows:

- 5 points: win
- 3 points: shoot-out win
- 2 points: shoot-out loss
- 0 points: loss

== Participating teams ==
The seven teams competing in the league come from Australia's states and territories, with the Northern Territory being the only team absent.

(South Australia) Adelaide Fire

Head Coach: Mark Victory

1. Bridget Laurance (GK)
2. Ella du Preez
3. Sherilyn Cass
4. Teyjah Abell
5. Holly Evans
6. Chloe Holland
7. Linzi Appleyard
8. Michaela Spano
9. Britney de Silva
10. Tyler Pedley
11. Lucy Sharman
12. Eliza White
13. Harriet Shand (C)
14. Annalise Abbott
15. Beatriz Monger-Molowny
16. Casey Crowley
19. Julia van den Heuvel
20. Puck de Beijer
21. Amy Hammond (GK)
22. Zara Pelham
23. Margot van Geffen
24. Shona McCallin
27. Gabriella Mitreska
29. Rosario Villagra
30. Rachel van der Ploeg
(Queensland) Brisbane Blaze

Head Coach: Nikki Taylor

1. Savannah Fitzpatrick
2. Ambrosia Malone
3. Kendra Fitzpatrick
4. Claire Colwill
5. Morgan Gallagher (C)
6. Camryn Mathison
7. Hannah Cullum-Sanders
8. Dayle Dolkens
9. Casey Dolkens
10. Madison Fitzpatrick
11. Morgan Mathison
12. Jade Smith
13. Karissa van der Wath
14. Stephanie Kershaw
15. Jade Reid
16. Keeley Walker
17. Andie Griffin
18. Madeline Kenny
19. Rhiannon Baxter
20. Jamie-Lee Surha
21. Renee Taylor
22. Britt Wilkinson
25. Kyra Livermore
32. Emily Witheyman-Crump (GK)
88. Jordan Bliss (GK)
(Australian Capital Territory) Canberra Chill

Head Coach: Matthew Cook

1. Mikayla Evans
2. Giselle Ansley
3. Grace Balsdon
4. Emma Baxter
5. Claudia Johnston
6. Emma Davidsmeyer
7. Naomi Evans (C)
8. Elena Rayer
10. Georgina West
12. Aleisha Price
13. Edwina Bone
15. Imogen Dorsett
16. Georgie Smithers
18. Olivia Martin
19. Lucy Nash
20. Philippa Mannix
21. Mikaela Patterson
22. Taquira McGrath
24. Sarah White
25. Lauren Yee
28. Caitriona Bailey-Price
29. Madeline Dooley
30. Gabrielle Millan (GK)
31. Sarah Steinhardt (GK)
32. Kayley Boye (GK)
(Victoria (state)) HC Melbourne

Head Coach: Daniel Mitchell

1. Sophie Taylor
2. Aisling Utri
3. Kary Chau
5. Kristina Bates
6. Josie Lawton
7. Ciara Utri
8. Hannah Cotter
9. Alannah Hibbard
10. Emily Hamilton-Smith
11. Rene Hunter (GK)
12. Charlotte Stapenhorst
13. Laura Barden
14. Olivia Downes
15. Gracie Geddis
16. Zara Geddis
17. Josie Erbsland
18. Dacia Koelmeyer
19. Zali Ward
20. Emma Leighton (GK)
21. Charlotte Hodgson
25. Hannah Gravenall (C)
27. Rachael Lynch (C, GK)
29. Samantha Love
30. Bianca Zurrer
31. Evie Stansby
(New South Wales) NSW Pride

Head Coach: Scott Barker

1. Alice Arnott
3. Chloe Holmes
4. Kendelle Tait
5. Chelsea Holmes
6. Ella Carr
7. Grace Stewart
8. Makayla Jones
9. Amalia Patterson
10. Hannah French
11. Emma Scriven
12. Greta Hayes
13. Miri Maroney
14. Emmalee Croker
16. Alana Kavanagh
17. Estelle Hughes
18. Lucinda Preeo
19. Jocelyn Bartram (GK)
20. Maddison Smith
21. Lily Neilson
22. Zoe Newman (GK)
23. Abigail Wilson
24. Mariah Williams (C)
25. Emma Spinks
29. Meike van Haeringen
32. Grace Young
(Western Australia) Perth Thundersticks

Head Coach: Philip Hulbert

1. Phillipa Morgan (C)
2. Kayla O'Sullivan
3. Neasa Flynn
4. Elyssa Melville
5. Courtney Schonell
6. Lexie Pickering
7. Penny Squibb
8. Georgina Dowd
9. Georgia Hiskins
10. Jesse Reid
12. Liné Malan
13. Caitlyn Templeman
14. Elizabeth Duguid (GK)
15. Bellé Ramshaw
16. Madison Naish
17. Annie Gibbs
18. Kaitlin Nobbs
19. Aleisha Power (GK)
20. Karri Somerville
21. Saysha Pillay
22. Jolie Sertorio
24. Eva Drummond
28. Georgia Wilson
33. Candyce Peacock
(Tasmania) Tassie Tigers
1. Sarah McCambridge (C)
2. Jemma Kenworthy
3. Fiona Crackles
4. Maddison Brooks
5. Taylor Brooks
6. Josie Crowden
7. Lily Bushby
8. Ruby Harris
9. Holly Hunt
10. Louisa Jacobson
11. Romani Kenworthy
12. Meah Leary
13. Phillida Bridley
14. Gitte Michels
15. Lucy Cooper
16. Madison Clark
17. Nellie Paynter
18. Kacee Pointing
19. Sarah Robertson
20. Beth Dobbie
21. Millie Smith
22. Lauren Canning
23. Holly Gilbar
25. Evelyn Dalton (GK)

== Venues ==
Melbourne	Perth	Adelaide
Melbourne Sports Centre	Perth Hockey Stadium	MATE Stadium
Capacity: 8,000	Capacity: 6,000	Capacity: 4,000
Brisbane	2024 Women's Hockey One is located in Australia	
Queensland State Hockey Centre	2024 Women's Hockey One is located in Australia	
Capacity: 1,000	2024 Women's Hockey One is located in Australia	
Canberra	2024 Women's Hockey One is located in Australia	
National Hockey Centre	2024 Women's Hockey One is located in Australia	
Goulburn	2024 Women's Hockey One is located in Australia	
Goulburn Hockey Complex	2024 Women's Hockey One is located in Australia	
Hobart	Narellan	Newcastle
Tasmanian Hockey Centre	Macarthur Regional Hockey Complex	Newcastle International Hockey Centre

== Results ==
=== Preliminary round ===
Pos	Team	Pld	W	WD	LD	L	GF	GA	GD	Pts	Qualification
1	(Western Australia) Perth Thundersticks	6	5	1	0	0	36	15	+21	28	Semi-finals
2	(Queensland) Brisbane Blaze	6	4	0	1	1	23	16	+7	22	Semi-finals
3	(New South Wales) NSW Pride	6	3	1	0	2	23	10	+13	18	Semi-finals
4	(Tasmania) Tassie Tigers	6	3	0	1	2	13	14	−1	17	Semi-finals
5	(Victoria (state)) HC Melbourne	6	2	1	0	3	10	19	−9	13	
6	(Australian Capital Territory) Canberra Chill	6	1	0	0	5	13	25	−12	5	
7	(South Australia) Adelaide Fire	6	0	0	1	5	6	25	−19	2	

Source: Hockey One
Rules for classification: 1) points; 2) matches won; 3) goal difference; 4) goals for; 5) head-to-head result; 6) field goals scored.

==== Fixtures ====
11 October 2024
21:00 (ACDT)

Adelaide Fire (South Australia)	1–1	(Victoria (state)) HC Melbourne
Cass 58'	Report	Stansby 49'
Penalties
Van Geffen (penalty shoot-out scored); McCallin (penalty shoot-out missed); Spano (penalty shoot-out missed); Pedley (penalty shoot-out missed)	1–3	(penalty shoot-out scored) Barden; (penalty shoot-out scored) Bates; (penalty shoot-out scored) Stapenhorst

MATE Stadium, Adelaide
Umpires:
Melanie Blanchard (AUS)
Rhiannon Murrie (AUS)

12 October 2024
16:30 (AEDT)

Tassie Tigers (Tasmania)	3–3	(New South Wales) NSW Pride
Michels 34'; McCambridge 38', 38'	Report	Patterson 20', 20'; Scriven 27'
Penalties
Hunt (penalty shoot-out scored); M. Brooks (penalty shoot-out missed); Harris (penalty shoot-out scored); Robertson (penalty shoot-out missed); Bridley (penalty shoot-out missed)	2–3	(penalty shoot-out scored) Wilson; (penalty shoot-out scored) French; (penalty shoot-out missed) Williams; (penalty shoot-out scored) Hayes

Tasmanian Hockey Centre, Hobart
Umpires:
Iris Milham (AUS)
Nicola Brown (AUS)

13 October 2024
15:30 (AEDT)

Canberra Chill (Australian Capital Territory)	3–10	(Western Australia) Perth Thundersticks
West 45', 45'; N. Evans 58'	Report	Pickering 6', 6', 42', 42'; Reid 19', 19'; Somerville 21'; Malan 43', 57', 57'

National Hockey Centre, Canberra
Umpires:
Emily Carroll (AUS)
Kristy Robertson (AUS)

18 October 2024
18:30 (AEDT)

Canberra Chill (Australian Capital Territory)	4–2	(South Australia) Adelaide Fire
N. Evans 3', 3'; Rayer 4', 4'	Report	Spano 4'; Crowley 10'

National Hockey Centre, Canberra
Umpires:
Emily Carroll (AUS)
Kristy Robertson (AUS)

19 October 2024
15:00 (AEDT)

NSW Pride (New South Wales)	2–3	(Queensland) Brisbane Blaze
Preeo 18', 44'	Report	M. Fitzpatrick 19', 21'; K. Fitzpatrick 21'

Newcastle International Hockey Centre, Newcastle
Umpires:
Cassidy Gallagher (AUS)
Michelle Farnill (AUS)

20 October 2024
17:30 (AWST)

Perth Thundersticks (Western Australia)	6–3	(Tasmania) Tassie Tigers
Nobbs 2', 2'; Peacock 4'; Schonell 20', 20'; Malan 60'	Report	McCambridge 5'; Crackles 8'; Bridley 11'

Perth Hockey Stadium, Perth
Umpires:
Jaxon Geddes (AUS)
Matthew Claxton (AUS)

25 October 2024
21:00 (AEST)

Brisbane Blaze (Queensland)	4–2	(Australian Capital Territory) Canberra Chill
S. Fitzpatrick 9', 32'; C. Dolkens 51'; Taylor 59'	Report	Ansley 11', 19'

Queensland State Hockey Centre, Brisbane
Umpires:
Aleisha Neumann (AUS)
Tamara Leonard (AUS)

26 October 2024
20:00 (AEDT)

HC Melbourne (Victoria (state))	2–6	(Western Australia) Perth Thundersticks
Gravenall 1', 1'	Report	Pickering 18'; Squibb 38'; Schonell 42', 42', 46', 46'

Melbourne Sports Centre, Melbourne
Umpires:
Nicola Brown (AUS)
Rhiannon Murrie (AUS)

27 October 2024
17:00 (ACDT)

Adelaide Fire (South Australia)	0–2	(Tasmania) Tassie Tigers
	Report	Michels 33', 35'

MATE Stadium, Adelaide
Umpires:
Iris Milham (AUS)
Melanie Blanchard (AUS)

1 November 2024
18:30 (AEDT)

HC Melbourne (Victoria (state))	1–6	(New South Wales) NSW Pride
Cotter 54'	Report	Wilson 6', 38', 38', 54', 54'; French 6'

Melbourne Sports Centre, Melbourne
Umpires:
Nicola Brown (AUS)
Iris Milham (AUS)

2 November 2024
15:00 (AEDT)

Tassie Tigers (Tasmania)	2–1	(Queensland) Brisbane Blaze
Cooper 41', 41'	Report	Malone 59'

Tasmanian Hockey Centre, Hobart
Umpires:
Courtney Pearson (AUS)
Aaron Kitchener (AUS)

3 November 2024
19:00 (AWST)

Perth Thundersticks (Western Australia)	5–0	(South Australia) Adelaide Fire
Drummond 6', 6', 28', 28'; Schonell 12'	Report

Perth Hockey Stadium, Perth
Umpires:
Jaxon Geddes (AUS)
Daniel Johnston (AUS)

8 November 2024
20:30 (AEDT)

NSW Pride (New South Wales)	1–3	(Western Australia) Perth Thundersticks
Scriven 33'	Report	Pickering 10', 10'; Squibb 48'

Macarthur Regional Hockey Complex, Narellan
Umpires:
Kristy Robertson (AUS)
Michelle Farnill (AUS)

9 November 2024
16:30 (AEDT)

Tassie Tigers (Tasmania)	3–2	(Australian Capital Territory) Canberra Chill
Michels 10'; Harris 19', 19'	Report	N. Evans 40', 40'

Tasmanian Hockey Centre, Hobart
Umpires:
Courtney Pearson (AUS)
Jayden Pearson (AUS)

10 November 2024
15:00 (AEST)

Brisbane Blaze (Queensland)	4–1	(Victoria (state)) HC Melbourne
Kershaw 11', 11'; Kenny 41'; S. Fitzpatrick 60'	Report	Cotter 2'

Queensland State Hockey Centre, Brisbane
Umpires:
Deborah O'Connell (AUS)
Tamara Leonard (AUS)

15 November 2024
20:00 (AEDT)

Canberra Chill (Australian Capital Territory)	2–3	(Victoria (state)) HC Melbourne
Yee 33', 33'	Report	Cotter 16', 16'; Gravenall 49'

National Hockey Centre, Canberra
Umpires:
Emily Carroll (AUS)
Deborah O'Connell (AUS)

16 November 2024
21:00 (ACDT)

Adelaide Fire (South Australia)	0–8	(New South Wales) NSW Pride
	Report	Stewart 14', 14'; Williams 21', 21'; Jones 28', 30', 30'; Wilson 59'

MATE Stadium, Adelaide
Umpires:
Courtney Pearson (AUS)
Michelle Farnill (AUS)

17 November 2024
17:30 (AWST)

Perth Thundersticks (Western Australia)	6–6	(Queensland) Brisbane Blaze
Pickering 24', 24', 32', 32', 55'; Malan 36'	Report	D. Dolkens 6', 13', 13', 43'; M. Fitzpatrick 54', 54'
Penalties
Nobbs (penalty shoot-out scored); Schonell (penalty shoot-out scored); Pickering (penalty shoot-out missed); Drummond (penalty shoot-out scored); Gibbs (penalty shoot-out missed); Nobbs (penalty shoot-out scored); Schonell (penalty shoot-out scored)	5–4	(penalty shoot-out scored) Kershaw; (penalty shoot-out scored) M. Fitzpatrick; (penalty shoot-out missed) Malone; (penalty shoot-out missed) Colwill; (penalty shoot-out scored) Mathison; (penalty shoot-out scored) D. Dolkens; (penalty shoot-out missed) M. Fitzpatrick

Perth Hockey Stadium, Perth
Umpires:
Jaxon Geddes (AUS)
Rhiannon Murrie (AUS)

22 November 2024
18:30 (AEDT)

HC Melbourne (Victoria (state))	2–0	(Tasmania) Tassie Tigers
A. Utri 36', 36'	Report

Melbourne Sports Centre, Melbourne
Umpires:
Nicola Brown (AUS)
Iris Milham (AUS)

23 November 2024
17:00 (AEST)

Brisbane Blaze (Queensland)	5–3	(South Australia) Adelaide Fire
Taylor 3'; S. Fitzpatrick 39', 49', 49'; Kershaw 58'	Report	Pelham 32'; Van Geffen 43', 43'

Queensland State Hockey Centre, Brisbane
Umpires:
Aleisha Neumann (AUS)
Tamara Leonard (AUS)

24 November 2024
13:00 (AEDT)

NSW Pride (New South Wales)	3–0	(Australian Capital Territory) Canberra Chill
Wilson 1', 40', 40'	Report

Goulburn Hockey Complex, Goulburn
Umpires:
Emily Carroll (AUS)
Harrison Lye (AUS)

=== Classification round ===
Semi-finals
30 November
(Western Australia) Perth Thundersticks	3
(Tasmania) Tassie Tigers	1
30 November
(Queensland) Brisbane Blaze	3
(New South Wales) NSW Pride	1

Final
1 December
(Western Australia) Perth Thundersticks	4
(Queensland) Brisbane Blaze	1
Third place
1 December
(Tasmania) Tassie Tigers	4 (0)
(New South Wales) NSW Pride (pen.)	4 (3)

==== Semi-finals ====
30 November 2024
12:30 (AEDT)

Perth Thundersticks (Western Australia)	3–1	(Tasmania) Tassie Tigers
Pickering 18'; Flynn 24'; Drummond 34'	Report	Michels 6'

Tasmanian Hockey Centre, Hobart
Umpires:
Cassidy Gallagher (AUS)
Tamara Leonard (AUS)

30 November 2024
16:00 (AEDT)

Brisbane Blaze (Queensland)	3–1	(New South Wales) NSW Pride
M. Fitzpatrick 45'; Colwill 47'; Smith 48'	Report	French 10'

Tasmanian Hockey Centre, Hobart
Umpires:
Iris Milham (AUS)
Kristy Robertson (AUS)

==== Third and fourth place ====
1 December 2024
10:00 (AEDT)

Tassie Tigers (Tasmania)	4–4	(New South Wales) NSW Pride
Michels 12', 35'; Harris 34'; Crackles 43'	Report	Wilson 8', 29', 31'; Neilson 50'
Penalties
Hunt (penalty shoot-out missed); Harris (penalty shoot-out missed); M. Brooks (penalty shoot-out missed)	0–3	(penalty shoot-out scored) Wilson; (penalty shoot-out scored) Williams; (penalty shoot-out scored) French

Tasmanian Hockey Centre, Hobart
Umpires:
Iris Milham (AUS)
Cassidy Gallagher (AUS)

==== Final ====
1 December 2024
13:00 (AEDT)

Perth Thundersticks (Western Australia)	4–1	(Queensland) Brisbane Blaze
Malan 16', 16'; Squibb 52'; Wilson 55'	Report	Kershaw 34'

Tasmanian Hockey Centre, Hobart
Umpires:
Kristy Robertson (AUS)
Tamara Leonard (AUS)

== Final standings ==
Pos	Team	Pld	W	WD	LD	L	GF	GA	GD	Pts	Final standing
1st place, gold medalist(s)	(Western Australia) Perth Thundersticks	8	7	1	0	0	43	17	+26	38	Gold Medal
2nd place, silver medalist(s)	(Queensland) Brisbane Blaze	8	5	0	1	2	27	21	+6	27	Silver Medal
3rd place, bronze medalist(s)	(New South Wales) NSW Pride	8	3	2	0	3	28	17	+11	21	Bronze Medal
4	(Tasmania) Tassie Tigers	8	3	0	2	3	18	21	−3	19	Fourth Place
5	(Victoria (state)) HC Melbourne	6	2	1	0	3	10	19	−9	13	Eliminated in Group Stage
6	(Australian Capital Territory) Canberra Chill	6	1	0	0	5	13	25	−12	5	Eliminated in Group Stage
7	(South Australia) Adelaide Fire	6	0	0	1	5	6	25	−19	2	Eliminated in Group Stage

Source: Hockey Australia

== Awards ==
Top Goalscorer	Player of the League	Player of the Final	Fans Player of the League
(Western Australia) Lexie Pickering	(Tasmania) Gitte Michels	(Western Australia) Aleisha Power	(Western Australia) Eva Drummond

== Team of the Year ==
At the conclusion of the regular season, a team of the year was named:

2024 Women's Team of the Year
Goalkeeper	Defenders	Midfielders	Forwards	Substitutes
Evelyn Dalton (Tigers)	Maddison Smith (Pride); Gitte Michels (Tigers); Penny Squibb (Thundersticks)	Fiona Crackles (Tigers); Jesse Reid (Thundersticks); Grace Young (Pride); Eva Drummond (Thundersticks)	Lexie Pickering (Thundersticks); Savannah Fitzpatrick (Blaze); Courtney Schonell (Thundersticks)	Elena Rayer (Chill); Abigail Wilson (Pride); Margot van Geffen (Fire); Holly Hunt (Tigers)

== Goalscorers ==
There were 145 goals scored in 25 matches, for an average of 5.8 goals per match.

13 goals

- (Western Australia) Lexie Pickering

12 goals

- (New South Wales) Abigail Wilson

7 goals

- (Western Australia) Liné Malan
- (Western Australia) Courtney Schonell
- (Tasmania) Gitte Michels

6 goals

- (Queensland) Savannah Fitzpatrick

5 goals

- (Queensland) Madison Fitzpatrick
- (Australian Capital Territory) Naomi Evans
- (Western Australia) Eva Drummond

4 goals

- (Queensland) Dayle Dolkens
- (Queensland) Stephanie Kershaw
- (Victoria (state)) Hannah Cotter

3 goals

- (Victoria (state)) Hannah Gravenall
- (New South Wales) Makayla Jones
- (Western Australia) Penny Squibb
- (Tasmania) Ruby Harris
- (Tasmania) Sarah McCambridge

2 goals

- (South Australia) Margot van Geffen
- (Queensland) Renee Taylor
- (Australian Capital Territory) Giselle Ansley
- (Australian Capital Territory) Elena Rayer
- (Australian Capital Territory) Georgina West
- (Australian Capital Territory) Lauren Yee
- (Victoria (state)) Aisling Utri
- (New South Wales) Hannah French
- (New South Wales) Amalia Patterson
- (New South Wales) Lucinda Preeo
- (New South Wales) Emma Scriven
- (New South Wales) Grace Stewart
- (New South Wales) Mariah Williams
- (Western Australia) Kaitlin Nobbs
- (Western Australia) Jesse Reid
- (Tasmania) Lucy Cooper
- (Tasmania) Fiona Crackles

1 goal

- (South Australia) Sherilyn Cass
- (South Australia) Casey Crowley
- (South Australia) Zara Pelham
- (South Australia) Michaela Spano
- (Queensland) Claire Colwill
- (Queensland) Casey Dolkens
- (Queensland) Kendra Fitzpatrick
- (Queensland) Madeline Kenny
- (Queensland) Ambrosia Malone
- (Queensland) Jade Smith
- (Victoria (state)) Evie Stansby
- (New South Wales) Lily Neilson
- (Western Australia) Neasa Flynn
- (Western Australia) Candyce Peacock
- (Western Australia) Karri Somerville
- (Western Australia) Georgia Wilson
- (Tasmania) Phillida Bridley

Source: Hockey Australia
