= Emma Davidsmeyer =

German field hockey player

Personal information
- Born: 30 March 1999 (age 27) Germany

Sport
- Sport: Field hockey
- Position: Defender
Senior career
Years	Team	Caps	Goals
2024–	Canberra Chill	-	-
National team
Years	Team	Caps	Goals
2017–2019	Germany U–21	29	(1)
2019–	Germany	39	(1)
2020–	Germany Indoor	5	(0)
Medal record
Women's field hockey
Representing Germany
EuroHockey Championship
Silver medal – second place	2025 Mönchengladbach
FIH Pro League
Silver medal – second place	Season Five
EuroHockey U21 Championship
Bronze medal – third place	2019 Valencia

Emma Davidsmeyer (born 30 March 1999) is a field hockey player from Germany.

== Career ==
=== Domestic league ===
Davidsmeyer previously played for Club an der Alster in the German Bundesliga.

In 2024, she moved to Australia for the fourth season of the Liberty Hockey One League. She was a member of the Canberra Chill squad.

=== Under–21 ===
Davidsmeyer made her international debut at under–21 level. She first represented the junior national team during a test series against Malaysia in Köln. She later went on to appear at the EuroHockey U–21 Championship in Valencia.

She won a bronze medal at the 2019 edition of the EuroHockey U–21 Championship, also in Valencia.

=== Die Danas ===
Davidsmeyer made her senior international debut in December 2019, during a test series against Argentina in Buenos Aires.

In 2024, Davidsmeyer was a member of the German team at the XXXIII Olympic Games in Paris.

==== International goals ====
Goal	Date	Location	Opponent	Score	Result	Competition	Ref.
1	27 June 2024	Wagener Stadium, Amsterdam, Netherlands	Great Britain	2–0	4–1	2023–24 FIH Pro League	
