= Ruby Harris =

Australian field hockey player (born 2001)

Personal information
- Born: 24 June 2001 (age 25) Brisbane, Australia

Sport
- Sport: Field hockey
- Position: Forward
Senior career
Years	Team	Caps	Goals
2019–2023	Brisbane Blaze	-	-
2024–	Tassie Tigers	-	-
National team
Years	Team	Caps	Goals
2020–2022	Australia U–21	6	(2)
2025–	Australia	0	(0)
Medal record
Women's field hockey
Representing Australia
Junior Oceania Cup
Gold medal – first place	2022 Canberra

Ruby Harris (born 24 June 2001) is a field hockey player from Australia.

== Personal life ==
Ruby Harris was born in Brisbane, and grew up in Corinda.

== Career ==
=== Domestic league ===
In Hockey Australia's premier domestic competition, the Liberty Hockey One, Harris represents the Tassie Tigers. She made the move to Hobart in 2024 to represent the side during the fourth season of the competition, helping the side to an historic fourth-place finish.

She also previously represented her home state as a member of the Brisbane Blaze.

=== Under–21 ===
Harris made her international debut at under–21 level. She made her first appearances for the Australian U–21 side, the Jillaroos, during a test–series against Japan in Canberra.

In 2022 she was a member of the gold medal-winning Jillaroos squad at the 2022 Junior Oceania Cup in Canberra.

=== Hockeyroos ===
Harris is a current member of the National Development Squad, and has been since 2024. She has been named in the Hockeyroos squad to make her senior international debut in 2025, during the Santiago del Estero leg of the 2024–25 FIH Pro League.
