= Melbourne Cobras =

Australian field hockey club

- Full name: Melbourne Cobras
- League: Hockey One
- Founded: 11 March 2026; 7 months ago
- Home ground: State Netball and Hockey Centre, Melbourne, Australia (Capacity 8,000)
- Website: melbournecobras.com

The Melbourne Cobras is an Australian professional field hockey club based in Melbourne, Victoria. The club was established in 2026, and is one of 8 clubs currently competing in Hockey Australia's premier domestic competition, the ONE Active Hockey One.

The club competed for the first time in the sixth season of the men's and women's Hockey One, which is currently being contested from October through to December 2026.

== History ==
The Melbourne Cobras are the eighth franchise in the Hockey One. They joined the competition in its sixth season, joining the seven other teams from Australia's states and territories.

The club was formed to help engage the Indian diaspora in Melbourne with the Australian elite hockey system.

== Uniform ==
The Melbourne Cobras colours are blue and tangerine, a nod to the traditional colours of the Indian national team.

== Home stadium ==
The club are based out of the State Sports Centre in Victoria's capital city, Melbourne. The stadium has a capacity of 8,000 spectators, with 1,000 fixed seats.

While being based out of the State Sports Centre, the team will also host some matches in Bendigo.

== Squads ==
=== Men ===
The following players were named in the men's squad.

No.	Pos.	Nation	Player
1	FW	AUS	Oscar Allan
2	DF	AUS	Douglas Buckley
3	MF	ENG	Evan Kimber (C)
4	MF	AUS	Kade Leigh
5	DF	AUS	Trent Symss
6	MF	AUS	Eden Davis
7	FW	IND	Gursahibjit Singh
8	DF	AUS	Joshua Bretherton
9	FW	IND	Gurjant Singh
10	MF	IND	Raheel Mouseen
11	FW	AUS	Hugh Snowden
12	MF	AUS	Jacob Whetton

No.	Pos.	Nation	Player
13	FW	AUS	Finn Hodder
14	MF	ENG	Peter Scott
15	DF	AUS	Corey O'Neil
16	DF	AUS	William Rutley
17	GK	AUS	Benjamin Hooppell
18	GK	AUS	Benjamin Rennie
19	DF	AUS	Samuel Lowndes
20	DF	AUS	Kaelan Boundy
23	DF	IND	Rohit Mohil
27	DF	PAK	Abu Mahmood
52	FW	AUS	Max Johnstone

=== Women ===
The following players were named in the women's squad.

No.	Pos.	Nation	Player
1	DF	AUS	Claire Colwill (C)
2	GK	AUS	Emma Leighton
3	MF	AUS	Jemma Ryan
4	MF	AUS	Charlotte Hodgson
5	MF	IND	Sonika Tandi
6	DF	IND	Mahima Choudhary
7	DF	AUS	Ella Carr
8	MF	AUS	Alannah Hibbard
9	FW	ARG	Delfina Thome
10	FW	ARG	Rosario Villagra
11	MF	AUS	Trinity Woodward
12	DF	AUS	Madison Fitzpatrick
13	FW	IND	Kanika Siwach

No.	Pos.	Nation	Player
14	DF	AUS	Anna Moore
16	DF	AUS	Gracie Geddis
17	FW	AUS	Zara Geddis
18	DF	IND	Udita Duhan
20	FW	IRE	Lily Lloyd
21	GK	USA	Jennifer Rizzo
23	DF	AUS	Maya Hilford
24	MF	AUS	Lahni Woodger
25	MF	AUS	Aimee Jungfer
27	DF	AUS	Lulu Olesen
32	MF	AUS	Hayley Carter
99	MF	IND	Ajmina Kujur
