= Australia women's national field hockey team results (2010–2019) =

The Australia women's national field hockey team results for the period 2010 to 2019. New fixtures are to be found on the team's section on the Hockey Australia page.
