= Georgie Smithers =

Australian field hockey player (born 2006)

Bianca Zurrer
Personal information
- Born: 14 May 2004 (age 22) Goulburn, Australia

Sport
- Sport: Field hockey
- Position: Defence
Senior career
Years	Team	Caps	Goals
2023–	Canberra Chill	15	0
National team
Years	Team	Caps	Goals
2025–2025	Australia U–21	16	(0)
2026–	Australia	3	(0)
Medal record
Women's field hockey
Representing Australia

Georgie Smithers (born 14 May 2004) is a field hockey player from Australia.

== Personal life ==
Smithers grew up in the regional New South Wales town, Goulburn.

== Career ==
=== Domestic hockey ===
At domestic level, Smithers competes in the ONE Active Hockey One League for the Canberra Chill. During the 2026 season she was named captain of the squad for the first time.

=== Under–21 ===
In 2025 Smithers made her debut for the Australian U–21 team, the Jillaroos. She was a member of the squad that travelled to Europe to play in a Four–Nations Tournament in Germany, where she earned her first junior caps. She also appeared in a test series against India in Canberra, and finally competed at the FIH Junior World Cup in Santiago.

=== Hockeyroos ===
She made her senior international debut in 2026, being called into the national squad for the FIH Pro League. She earned her first cap in a match against China in Hobart.
