= Jamie-Lee Surha =

Australian field hockey player

Personal information
- Born: 29 April 2005 (age 21) Mackay, Queensland, Australia

Sport
- Sport: Field hockey
- Position: Forward
Senior career
Years	Team	Caps	Goals
2024–	Brisbane Blaze	4	0
National team
Years	Team	Caps	Goals
2025–	Australia	0	(0)
Medal record
Women's field hockey
Representing Australia

Jamie-Lee Surha (born 29 April 2005) is field hockey player from Australia, who plays as a forward.

== Personal life ==
Jamie-Lee Surha was born and raised in Mackay, Queensland. She has been named as one of Queensland's top junior hockey players to watch.

She is a former student of the Mackay North State High School.

== Career ==
=== Domestic ===
In domestic competitions hosted by Hockey Australia, Surha represents her home state of Queensland. In 2024, she made her debut for the Brisbane Blaze in the Australia's premier domestic field hockey competition, the Liberty Hockey One League.

=== Under–21 ===
Following an outstanding performance at the 2025 Australian U–21 Championships, Surha received her first inclusion in the Australian U–21 squad, the Jillaroos.

=== Hockeyroos ===
In 2025, Surha received call-ups to the Australian Development Squad and the Hockeyroos for a practice match series against India in Perth. Following the series, she received her first official call-up to the national team. She will make her senior internal debut during the European Leg of the 2024–25 FIH Pro League.
