= Courtney Schonell =

Australian field hockey player

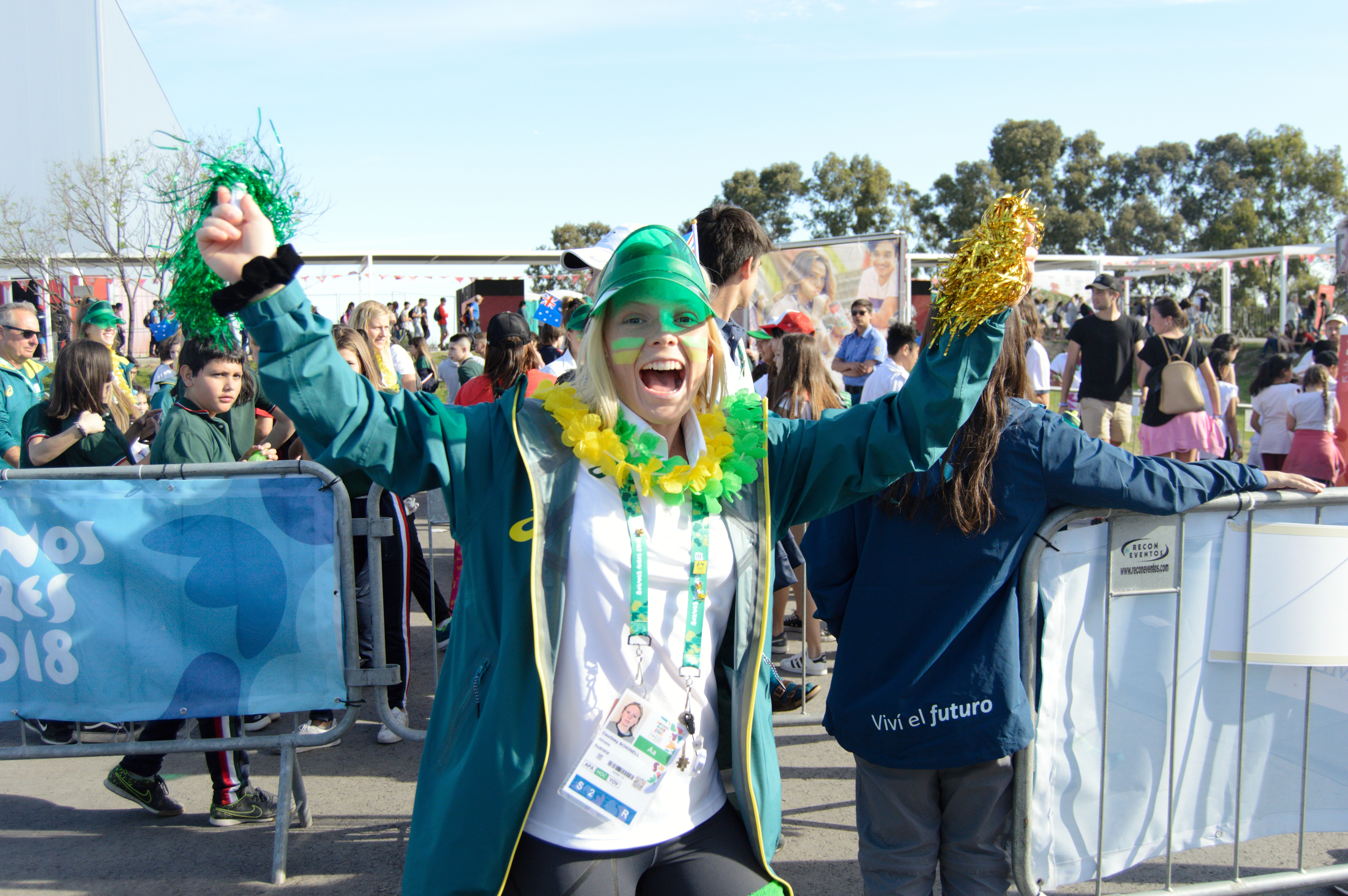
- Schonell at the 2018 Summer Youth Olympics

Personal information
- Born: 17 September 2000 (age 26) Mount Annan, New South Wales, Australia
- Height: 1.68 m (5 ft 6 in)
- Weight: 60 kg (132 lb)

Sport
- Sport: Field hockey
- Position: Forward
Senior career
Years	Team	Caps	Goals
2017	NSW Arrows	7	2
2019–2020	Beeston	5	2
2019–2022	NSW Pride	10	0
2024–	Perth Thundersticks	19	16
National team
Years	Team	Caps	Goals
2018–2020	Australia U–21	11	(4)
2021–	Australia	58	(11)
Medal record
Women's field hockey
Representing Australia
FIH Pro League
Bronze medal – third place	Season Four
Oceania Cup
Gold medal – first place	2023 Whangārei

Courtney Schonell (born 17 September 2000) is an Australian field hockey player, who plays as a forward.

== Personal life ==
Courtney Schonell was born and raised in Narellan Vale, New South Wales, and grew up in the neighbouring suburb of Mount Annan.

Schonell is a former student of St. Benedict's Catholic College in Oran Park.

== Career ==
=== Domestic league ===
In Hockey Australia's premier domestic league, the Sultana Bran Hockey One, Schonell is a member of the NSW Pride. She represented the team in the inaugural season of the competition.

=== International ===
==== Under–21 ====
In 2018, Schonell made her first appearance for the Australia U–21 team during a test-series against New Zealand in Hastings. Following this, she represented the team in 2019 at a Tri–Nations Tournament in Canberra, as well as a 2020 test series against Japan in Canberra.

==== Hockeyroos ====
Following a 2020 Super-Camp, Schonell was named in the Hockeyroos squad for the first time.

She will make her first appearance for the team during the 2021 Trans–Tasman Series.

== International goals ==
The following is a list of international goals scored by Schonell.

Goal	Date	Location	Opponent	Score	Result	Competition	Ref.
1	30 April 2023	Ngā Puna Wai Sports Hub, Christchurch, New Zealand	New Zealand	1–1	2–1	2022–23 FIH Pro League	
2	30 April 2023	Ngā Puna Wai Sports Hub, Christchurch, New Zealand	New Zealand	2–1	2–1	2022–23 FIH Pro League	
3	18 May 2023	MATE Stadium, Adelaide, Australia	India	4–1	4–2	Test Match	
4	16 June 2023	Wilrijkse Plein, Antwerp, Belgium	Belgium	1–0	2–0	2022–23 FIH Pro League	
5	13 August 2023	Northland Hockey Association, Whangārei, New Zealand	New Zealand	3–1	3–2	2023 Oceania Cup	
6	5 February 2025	Sydney Olympic Park, Sydney, Australia	Spain	3–1	4–1	2024–25 FIH Pro League	
7	6 February 2025	Sydney Olympic Park, Sydney, Australia	China	1–0	2–2	2024–25 FIH Pro League	
8	24 February 2025	Polideportivo Provincial, Santiago del Estero, Argentina	Belgium	2–3	2–3	2024–25 FIH Pro League	
9	14 June 2025	Lee Valley Hockey Stadium, London, United Kingdom	India	1–0	3–2	2024–25 FIH Pro League	
10	22 June 2025	Ernst-Reuter-Sportfeld, Berlin, Germany	Germany	1–3	4–3	2024–25 FIH Pro League	
