= Adelaide Fire =

Australian field hockey club

- Full name: Adelaide Fire
- League: Hockey One
- Founded: 17 April 2019; 7 years ago
- Home ground: MATE Stadium, Adelaide, Australia (Capacity 4,000)
- Website: hockeysa.com.au

Adelaide Fire is an Australian professional field hockey club based in Adelaide, South Australia. The club was established in 2019, and is one of 7 established to compete in Hockey Australia's new premier domestic competition, Hockey One.

The club unifies both men and women under one name, unlike South Australia's former representation in the Australian Hockey League as the SA Hotshots (men) and SA Suns (women).

Adelaide Fire will compete for the first time in the inaugural season of Hockey One, which will be contested from late September through to mid November 2019.

== History ==
Adelaide Fire, along with six other teams, was founded on 17 April 2019 as part of Hockey Australia's development of hockey. The establishment of the club however, was not met without challenges. It was feared Hockey SA would not enter Hockey One due to financial restraints, however after a public fundraiser the entry quota was met.

The club name of the Fire is a natural progression and combination of the former club names – the Hotshots and the Suns.

== Uniform ==
The club colours are a modern take on traditional SA colours, the yellow, now replaced with white provides a cleaner, modern feel to the uniforms.

Adelaide Fire Men's Uniform	Adelaide Fire Women's Uniform

== Home Stadium ==
Adelaide Fire are based out of MATE Stadium in South Australia's capital city, Adelaide. The stadium has a capacity of 4,000 spectators, with 330 fixed seats.

Throughout the Hockey One league, Adelaide Fire will play a number of home games at the stadium.

== Teams ==
=== Men's team ===
The following players were named in the men's squad for the 2023 season.

No.	Pos.	Nation	Player
1	FW	AUS	Kieran Govers
2	DF	AUS	Connor Richmond-Spouse
3	MF	AUS	Lucas Toonen
4	FW	AUS	Jack Holland
6	FW	AUS	Matthew Magann
7	DF	ENG	Peter Scott
8	FW	AUS	Brodie Gleeson
9	MF	AUS	Fred Gray
10	DF	AUS	Lachlan Arneil
11	FW	AUS	Kyton Rayner
12	MF	AUS	Mitchell Dell

No.	Pos.	Nation	Player
13	FW	AUS	Alastair Oliver
14	FW	SCO	Fraser Heigh
15	MF	AUS	Paxton Silby
16	DF	AUS	Hugh Snowden
17	DF	NZL	Charl Ulrich
18	DF	AUS	Richard Hancock
20	DF	AUS	Chris Wells
21	GK	AUS	Jed Snowden
22	GK	AUS	Edward Chittleborough
23	FW	AUS	Hassan Singh
24	FW	RSA	Jethro Eustice

=== Women's team ===
The following players have been named in the women's squad for the 2024 season.

No.	Pos.	Nation	Player
—	DF	AUS	Annalise Abbott
—	FW	AUS	Teyjah Abell
—	MF	AUS	Linzi Appleyard
—	FW	AUS	Sherilyn Cass
—	MF	NZL	Casey Crowley
—	MF	AUS	Puck de Beijer
—	FW	AUS	Britney de Silva
—	FW	AUS	Ella du Preez
—	MF	AUS	Holly Evans-Gill
—	DF	NED	Margot van Geffen
—	GK	AUS	Amy Hammond
—	MF	NED	Julia van den Heuvel

No.	Pos.	Nation	Player
—	FW	AUS	Chloe Holland
—	GK	AUS	Bridget Laurance
—	MF	ENG	Shona McCallin
—	DF	AUS	Gabriella Mitreska
—	FW	AUS	Beatriz Monger-Molowny
—	MF	AUS	Tyler Pedley
—	DF	AUS	Zara Pelham
—	DF	AUS	Harriet Shand
—	FW	AUS	Katie Sharkey
—	MF	AUS	Lucy Sharman
—	FW	AUS	Michaela Spano
—	MF	AUS	Eliza White
