= Hockey Queensland =

Australian hockey governing body

Queensland Hockey Association
- Sport: Field hockey
- Abbreviation: QHA
- Founded: 1948; 78 years ago
- Affiliation: Hockey Australia

Official website
- www.hockeyqld.com.au
- (Queensland)

Hockey Queensland is the governing body for the sport of hockey in Queensland, Australia. It is responsible for the administration of intrastate competitions, state representative teams, officials and the financial position of the sport. It's located in the Queensland State Hockey Centre in Colmslie, a suburb south of Brisbane.

== History ==
On 11 November 1995, the Queensland Women's Hockey Association merged with Queensland Men's Hockey Association ending 75 years of independent operation and created Hockey Queensland. The combined Hockey Queensland structure boasts gender equity as well as increased and maintained funding levels to men's and women's programs. Hockey Queensland helped field hockey become an inaugural sport with the Queensland Academy of Sport (QAS) and the Northern University Games.

== Associations ==
=== South East Queensland ===
- Brisbane Hockey Association
- Brisbane Women's Hockey Association
- Gold Coast Hockey Association
- Ipswich Hockey Association
- Redlands Hockey Association
- Sunshine Coast Hockey Association
- Tweed Border Hockey Association
- Toowoomba Hockey Association
- Warwick Hockey Association

=== Wide Bay ===
- Bundaberg Hockey Association
- Gympie & Districts Hockey Association
- Hervey Bay Hockey Association
- Maryborough & Districts Hockey Association

=== Central Queensland ===
- Gladstone & Districts Hockey Association
- Mackay Hockey Association
- Rockhampton Hockey Association
- Moranbah Hockey Association

=== North Queensland ===
- Atherton Hockey Association
- Cairns Hockey Association
- Mount Isa Hockey Association
- Townsville Hockey Association

== See also ==
- Queensland Blades
