= Aleisha Power =

Australian field hockey player

Personal information
- Born: 1 January 1997 (age 29) Northam, Australia

Sport
- Sport: Field hockey
- Position: Goalkeeper
Senior career
Years	Team	Caps	Goals
2015–2018	WA Diamonds	21	0
2019–	Perth Thundersticks	7	0
National team
Years	Team	Caps	Goals
2015–2016	Australia U–21	14	(0)
2017–	Australia	4	(0)
Medal record
Women's field hockey
Representing Australia
World Cup
Bronze medal – third place	2022 Terrassa/Amstelveen
FIH Pro League
Bronze medal – third place	Season Four	Team
Commonwealth Games
Silver medal – second place	2022 Birmingham
FIH Junior World Cup
Bronze medal – third place	2016 Santiago

Aleisha Power (born 1 January 1997) is an Australian field hockey player, who plays as a goalkeeper.

== Personal life ==
Aleisha Power was born and raised in Northam, Western Australia.

== Career ==
=== Domestic hockey ===
==== Australian Hockey League ====
From 2015 until the league's dissolution in 2018, Power was a member of the WA Diamonds squad in the Australian Hockey League (AHL).

==== Hockey One ====
In 2019, Hockey Australia introduced the Sultana Bran Hockey One, a new premier domestic hockey competition to replace the AHL. Power was named in the Perth Thundersticks team for the inaugural season of the league, where she appeared in all six games.

=== Australia ===
==== Under–21 ====
Aleisha Power was first named in the Australia U–21 squad in 2015. She made her first appearance for the team later that year, in a series of test matches against Argentina in Buenos Aires.

In 2016, she was a member of the team at the Junior Oceania Cup on the Gold Coast. She followed this up with a bronze medal appearance at the FIH Junior World Cup in Santiago.

At the Junior World Cup, Power was awarded Goalkeeper of the Tournament.

==== Hockeyroos ====
Power made her Hockeyroos debut in 2017, during a test series against Japan in Adelaide.

She didn't make another appearance for the team until 2021, when she was named in the Hockeyroos squad for the first time.
