= Georgia Wilson (field hockey) =

Australian field hockey player

Personal information
- Born: 20 May 1996 (age 30) Mahogany Creek, Western Australia

Sport
- Sport: Field hockey
- Position: Midfielder
- Club: Perth Thundersticks
National team
Years	Team	Caps	Goals
2016	Australia U–21	3	(0)
2017–	Australia	27	(0)
Medal record
Women's field hockey
Representing Australia
World Cup
Bronze medal – third place	2022 Terrassa/Amstelveen
Commonwealth Games
Silver medal – second place	2022 Birmingham
Oceania Cup
Gold medal – first place	2017 Sydney

Georgia Wilson (born 20 May 1996) is an Australian field hockey player. In 2017 she was named to the Australian national team. She has also played for WA Diamonds. Her position is midfield.

== Early life and education ==
Wilson grew up in Mahogany Creek, Western Australia. She began playing hockey at age 4. Wilson studies Human Biology and Marketing at University of Western Australia.

== Career ==
=== Junior National Team ===
Wilson first represented Australia at a junior level in 2016 at the Junior Oceania Cup, where the team finished first, securing qualification to the Junior World Cup.

Later that year, Wilson was also selected in the 'Jillaroos' squad for the Junior World Cup. Shortly before the tournament, she tore her hamstring forcing her to withdraw from the competition, and the injury ultimately sidelined her for three and a half months. Following the injury, Wilson participated in a national team training camp.

=== Senior National Team ===
In March 2017 Wilson was selected for the 2017 Hockeyroos squad, the Australian national women's field hockey team. Wilson plays the position of midfield. Wilson was part of the Hockeyroos team that secured a place in the 2018 women's field hockey world cup with a fifth-place finish at the 2017 World League Semi-Final.

Wilson was part of the WA Diamonds for the 2017 Australian Hockey League. That same year Hockey WA gave her the Rechelle Hawkes Youth Player of the Year award.
