= Liné Malan =

South African field hockey player (born 1992)

Personal information
- Born: 20 June 1992 (age 34) United Kingdom
- Height: 165 cm (5 ft 5 in)

Sport
- Sport: Field hockey
- Position: Midfield
Senior career
Years	Team	Caps	Goals
2019–	Perth Thundersticks	-	-
National team
Years	Team	Caps	Goals
2013	South Africa U–21	6	(0)
2015–2016	South Africa	26	(0)
Medal record
Women's field hockey
Representing South Africa

Liné Malan (born 20 June 1992) is a field hockey player from South Africa, who plays as a midfielder.

== Personal life ==
Liné Malan was born in the United Kingdom. At the age of three, her family moved to Paarl, South Africa.

Her brother, Dawid, is an international cricketer for England.

== Career ==
=== Domestic leagues ===
Malan has played domestically in South Africa, England and Australia.

In 2017, she played for the Wineland Wings in the season two of the South African Premier Hockey League.

Following her move to Australia in 2018, Malan has played regularly in the national league for Western Australian teams, the WA Diamonds in the AHL, and the Perth Thundersticks in the Hockey One.

=== International career ===
==== Under–21 ====
Liné Malan made her debut for the South Africa U–21 in 2013 at the FIH Junior World Cup in Mönchengladbach.

==== National team ====
Malan made her debut for the national team in 2015 during a test event in Cape Town against Chile and Belgium. She subsequently appeared at the 2014–15 FIH World League Semi-finals in Valencia.

She last represented the national team in 2016 during the Cape Town Summer Series.
