= Perth Thundersticks =

Australian field hockey club

- Full name: Perth Thundersticks
- League: Hockey One
- Founded: 1991; 35 years ago
- Home ground: Perth Hockey Stadium, Perth, Australia (Capacity 6,000)
- Website: hockeywa.org.au

The Perth Thundersticks are an Australian professional hockey club based in Perth, Western Australia. The club was established in 2019, and is one of 7 established to compete in Hockey Australia's new premier domestic competition, Hockey One.

The club is intended to unify men's and women's by combining teams under one name, unlike Western Australia's former representation in the Australian Hockey League as the WA Thundersticks (men) and WA Diamonds (women).

Perth Thundersticks will compete for the first time in the inaugural season of Hockey One, which will be contested from late September through to mid November 2019.

== History ==
Perth Thundersticks, along with six other teams, was founded on 17 April 2019 as part of Hockey Australia's development of hockey.

While this club was established in April 2019, the Perth Thundersticks have competed at a national level in the past. Before transitioning to their current name, the WA Thundersticks, the team previously competed under the name Perth Thundersticks until 2001.

== Uniform ==
The club colours are WA's traditional colours, black, gold and white.

Perth Thundersticks men's uniform	Perth Thundersticks women's uniform

== Home stadium ==
Perth Thundersticks are based out of the Perth Hockey Stadium in Western Australia's capital city, Perth. The stadium has a capacity of 6,000 spectators.

Throughout the Hockey One league, Perth Thundersticks will play a number of home games at the stadium.

== Teams ==
=== Men's team ===
Details and team rosters to be confirmed.

=== Women's team ===
The following players were named in the women's squad for the 2023 season.

No.	Pos.	Nation	Player
—	MF	AUS	Sarah Byrnes
—	FW	AUS	Britney de Silva
—	FW	AUS	Georgina Dowd
—	GK	AUS	Elizabeth Duguid
—	FW	AUS	Neasa Flynn
—	DF	AUS	Rachel Frusher
—	MF	AUS	Annie Gibbs
—	MF	RSA	Liné Malan
—	DF	AUS	Elyssa Melville
—	MF	AUS	Phillipa Morgan
—	FW	AUS	Kayla O'Sullivan

No.	Pos.	Nation	Player
—	FW	AUS	Lexie Pickering
—	FW	AUS	Saysha Pillay
—	GK	AUS	Aleisha Power
—	DF	AUS	Belle Ramshaw
—	DF	AUS	Jesse Reid
—	MF	AUS	Anna Roberts
—	FW	AUS	Renee Rockliff
—	DF	AUS	Karri Somerville
—	DF	AUS	Penny Squibb
—	FW	AUS	Shanea Tonkin
—	MF	AUS	Georgia Wilson
