= Canberra Chill =

Australian field hockey club

- Full name: Canberra Chill
- League: Hockey One
- Founded: 17 April 2019; 7 years ago
- Home ground: National Hockey Centre, Canberra, Australia (Capacity 2,000)
- Website: hockeyact.org.au

Canberra Chill is an Australian professional hockey club based in Canberra, Australian Capital Territory. The club was established in 2019, and is one of 7 established to compete in Hockey Australia's new premier domestic competition, Hockey One.

The club unifies both men and women under one name, unlike the Australian Capital Territory's former representation in the Australian Hockey League as the Canberra Lakers (men) and Canberra Strikers (women).

Canberra Chill competed for the first time in the inaugural season of Hockey One, which was contested from 29 September through to 16 November 2019.

== History ==
Canberra Chill, along with six other teams, was founded on 17 April 2019 as part of Hockey Australia's development of hockey.

The club uniform and colours are based around the ACT flag, comprising mainly yellow and blue.

== Home stadium ==
Canberra Chill are based out of the National Hockey Centre in the Australian Capital Territory, and Australia's capital city, Canberra. The stadium has a capacity of approximately 2,000 spectators.

In the Hockey One league, Canberra Chill plays a number of home games at the stadium.

== Teams ==
=== Men's Team ===
Men's team for the 2024 Season.

No.	Pos.	Nation	Player
1	FW	AUS	Aaron Knight
2	FW	AUS	Benjamin Staines
3	DF	AUS	Anand Gupte
5	FW	AUS	Jesse Absolom
6	DF	ESP	Xavi Gispert
7	MF	AUS	Aidan Smith
8	DF	AUS	Sean Baker
10	MF	AUS	Owen Chivers
11	FW	AUS	Garry Backhus
12	MF	AUS	Jake Staines
13	DF	AUS	Dylan Brick
14	DF	FRA	Theo Ponthieu

No.	Pos.	Nation	Player
15	MF	AUS	Hayden Dillon
16	MF	AUS	Oscar Smart
17	FW	AUS	Aiden Dooley
18	MF	JPN	Kaito Tanaka
19	MF	AUS	Hamish Morrison
20	FW	AUS	Niranjan Gupte
22	DF	AUS	Darcy Macdonald
23	DF	AUS	Jay Macdonald
24	MF	AUS	Davis Atkin
26	FW	AUS	James Jewell
27	GK	AUS	Max Robson
30	GK	AUS	Andrew Charter

=== Women's team ===
The women's team was announced on 30 August 2022, via Canberra Chill's official Instagram page.

No.	Pos.	Nation	Player
1	FW	AUS	Mikayla Evans
2	DF	AUS	Isabelle Lovel
4	FW	NZL	Madison Doar
6	MF	NZL	Katie Doar
7	DF	AUS	Naomi Evans (C)
8	MF	AUS	Laura Reid
11	MF	AUS	Sophie Gaughan
13	DF	AUS	Edwina Bone
14	DF	AUS	Emily Robson
15	GK	AUS	Asta Johnson

No.	Pos.	Nation	Player
16	DF	JPN	Shihori Oikawa
18	FW	AUS	Olivia Martin
19	DF	AUS	Riley Smith
20	FW	AUS	Stephanie Kindon
21	MF	AUS	Mikaela Patterson
23	MF	AUS	Kalindi Commerford
24	MF	AUS	Sarah White
25	DF	AUS	Lauren Yee
28	FW	AUS	Catriona Bailey-Price
32	GK	AUS	Rene Hunter
