= Karri Somerville =

Australian field hockey player

Personal information
- Born: 7 April 1999 (age 27) Kensington, Western Australia, Australia

Sport
- Sport: Field hockey
- Position: Defender
- Club: Perth Thundersticks
National team
Years	Team	Caps	Goals
2016–	Australia U–21	6	(0)
2018–	Australia Indoor	6	(1)
Medal record
Women's field hockey
Representing Australia
World Cup
Bronze medal – third place	2022 Terrassa/Amstelveen
Commonwealth Games
Silver medal – second place	2022 Birmingham
Oceania Cup
Gold medal – first place	2023 Whangārei	Team
Junior World Cup
Bronze medal – third place	2016 Santiago

Karri Somerville (born 7 April 1999) is an Australian field hockey player.

== Personal life ==
Karri Somerville was born in Kensington, Western Australia. She was a student at All Saint's College in Bull Creek, Western Australia, from where she graduated in 2016.

Somerville is a current scholarship holder at the Western Australian Institute of Sport.

== Career ==
=== Junior ===
In 2016, Somerville was a member of the Australian women's junior national team 'The Jillaroos' that won bronze at the 2016 Junior World Cup in Santiago, Chile.

=== Indoor ===
Somerville made her debut for the Australian indoor hockey team in 2018, at the Indoor World Cup in Berlin, Germany. At the tournament, Australia finished in 6th place, and Somerville scored once throughout the competition.

=== Senior ===
While Somerville has not yet debuted for the Hockeyroos, she is currently a member of the national development squad.

Somerville qualified for the Tokyo 2020 Olympics. She was part of the Hockeyroos Olympics squad. The Hockeyroos lost 1–0 to India in the quarterfinals and therefore were not in medal contention.
