= Hockey One =

Field hockey competition in Australia

- Formerly: Australian Hockey League
- Sport: Field hockey
- Founded: 2019
- No. of teams: 8
- Country: Australia
- Continent: Oceania (OHF)
- Most recent champions: (Victoria (state)) HC Melbourne (M) (Western Australia) Perth Thundersticks (W)
- Most titles: (Victoria (state)) HC Melbourne (New South Wales) NSW Pride (M) (2) (Queensland) Brisbane Blaze (W) (2)
- Broadcaster: 7plus
- Website: hockeyone.com.au

The One Active Hockey One is a field hockey competition organised by Hockey Australia, which replaced the Australian Hockey League.

Dual competitions are conducted for both men's and women's teams, with parallel fixtures for both competitions throughout the regular season. The league serves as Australia's premier domestic hockey league, helping unearth future talent for selection to the Australian national teams; the Kookaburras and Hockeyroos.

The NSW Pride and the Brisbane Blaze are currently the most successful teams, winning three out of six titles each. The Pride won both the men's and women's competitions in 2022, whereas the Blaze won both competitions in 2023.

== History ==
The Hockey One League was founded on 17 April 2019. The tournament was formed following an overhaul of the Australian Hockey League, and replaced the tournament to serve as Australia's premier hockey competition.

Following a series of rule innovations during the 2018 men's and women's AHL tournaments, Hockey Australia made the decision to disband the premier competition, making way for the new domestic league.

On 23 September 2019, Hockey Australia confirmed that the new league had secured a major partnership with Kellogg's, with naming rights also afforded to the company, forming the Sultana Bran Hockey One League. The sponsorship was for the first two seasons, which due to the COVID-19 pandemic extended through to the 2022 (second) season. The following day it was confirmed that Westfund Health Insurance had been named as a supporting partner.

=== COVID-19 pandemic impact ===
Following a successful first season of the Sultana Bran Hockey One in 2019, the second edition was anticipated for commencement in late 2020. However, due to the COVID-19 pandemic, the league's second season was postponed until 2021. The decision was made by the Hockey One board on 24 March 2020 following consultations with Hockey Australia and the seven member associations in the league, all of which being unable to financially support the program later in the year.

The postponement was not only made to benefit associations financially, but also on account of restrictions put into place by the Government of Australia, which prohibited mass-gatherings and sporting events. The league went on to postpone the second season to October 2022, owing to divergent state border restrictions in place across the country in late 2021.

=== Since 2022 ===
On 11 September 2023, the league announced Jamie Dwyer Hockey (JDH) as the new official naming rights partner, with the 2023 (third) season named the JDH Hockey One League. On 24 September 2024, Liberty was announced as naming rights partner, officially renaming the league to the Liberty Hockey One League for season four (2024). The league is currently sponsored energy drink company One Active. The league expanded to eight teams ahead of the 2026 season, with the introduction of the Melbourne Cobras.

== Format ==
From 2019 to 2025, seven teams competed in a round-robin tournament with home and away matches, played from late September to mid November or early December, with the top four teams advancing to a finals round. As of 2026, the eight teams play seven matches against each of their opponents during the pool stage, and the top four teams qualify for the semi-finals and third-place playoff or grand final. These knockout matches are hosted by a single venue selected by Hockey Australia.

=== Teams ===
The following eight teams compete in the league. From 2019 to 2025, seven teams competed in the league, with the Melbourne Cobras introduced in 2026.

- (South Australia) Adelaide Fire
- (Queensland) Brisbane Blaze
- (Australian Capital Territory) Canberra Chill
- (Victoria (state)) HC Melbourne
- (Victoria (state)) Melbourne Cobras
- (New South Wales) NSW Pride
- (Western Australia) Perth Thundersticks
- (Tasmania) Tassie Tigers

== Men's tournament ==
=== Summaries ===
Year	Hosts	Gold Medal Match			Third and Fourth		
Year	Hosts	Champions	Score	Runners-up	3rd place	Score	4th place
2019	Melbourne	(New South Wales); NSW Pride	8–3	(Queensland); Brisbane Blaze	(Tasmania); Tassie Tigers	Round-robin	(Victoria (state)); HC Melbourne
2022	Bendigo	(New South Wales); NSW Pride	2–0	(Western Australia); Perth Thundersticks	(Queensland); Brisbane Blaze	6–2	(Australian Capital Territory); Canberra Chill
2023	Canberra	(Queensland); Brisbane Blaze	3–3 (5–3 pen.)	(New South Wales); NSW Pride	(Victoria (state)); HC Melbourne	2–1	(Tasmania); Tassie Tigers
2024	Hobart	(Victoria (state)); HC Melbourne	5–2	(Australian Capital Territory); Canberra Chill	(Queensland); Brisbane Blaze	4–3	(Western Australia); Perth Thundersticks
2025	Melbourne	(Victoria (state)); HC Melbourne	3–1	(Tasmania); Tassie Tigers	(New South Wales); NSW Pride	10–4	(Queensland); Brisbane Blaze
2026	Gold Coast						

=== Awards ===
Men's Statistics
Year	Player of the League	Highest Goalscorer(s)	Player of the Final	Fans Player of the Season
2019	Eddie Ockenden (Tigers)	Blake Govers (Pride)	Flynn Ogilvie (Pride)	Not Awarded
2022	Andrew Charter (Chill)	Joel Rintala (Blaze)	Ky Willott (Pride)	Not Awarded
2023	Timothy Brand (Pride)	Jacob Anderson (Blaze)	Blake Govers (Pride)	Not Awarded
2024	Eddie Ockenden (Tigers)	Landon Morley (Fire); Aiden Dooley (Chill)	Nathan Ephraums (Melbourne)	Cooper Burns (Melbourne)
2025	Nathan Ephraums (Melbourne)	Blake Govers (Pride)	Ky Willott (Melbourne)	Blake Govers (Pride)
2026		Cooper Burns (Melbourne); Nathan Ephraums (Melbourne)		

=== Team Appearances ===
Team	2019	2022	2023	2024	2025	2026	Total
(South Australia) Adelaide Fire	7th	7th	5th	7th	7th	8th	6
(Queensland) Brisbane Blaze	2nd	3rd	1st	3rd	4th	7th	6
(Australian Capital Territory) Canberra Chill	5th	4th	7th	2nd	5th	Q	6
(Victoria (state)) HC Melbourne	4th	6th	3rd	1st	1st	Q	6
(Victoria (state)) Melbourne Cobras	–	–	–	–	–	6th	1
(New South Wales) NSW Pride	1st	1st	2nd	6th	3rd	5th	6
(Western Australia) Perth Thundersticks	6th	2nd	6th	4th	6th	Q	6
(Tasmania) Tassie Tigers	3rd	5th	4th	5th	2nd	Q	6
Total	7	7	7	7	7	8	

== Women's tournament ==
=== Summaries ===
Year	Final Host	Gold Medal Match			Third and Fourth		
Year	Final Host	Champions	Score	Runners-up	3rd place	Score	4th place
2019	Melbourne	(Queensland); Brisbane Blaze	1–1 (3–2 pen.)	(Victoria (state)); HC Melbourne	(South Australia); Adelaide Fire	Round-robin	(Australian Capital Territory); Canberra Chill
2022	Bendigo	(New South Wales); NSW Pride	2–2 (3–1 pen.)	(Queensland); Brisbane Blaze	(Western Australia); Perth Thundersticks	3–0	(Victoria (state)); HC Melbourne
2023	Canberra	(Queensland); Brisbane Blaze	4–1	(Australian Capital Territory); Canberra Chill	(Western Australia); Perth Thundersticks	2–1	(New South Wales); NSW Pride
2024	Hobart	(Western Australia); Perth Thundersticks	4–1	(Queensland); Brisbane Blaze	(New South Wales); NSW Pride	4–4 (3–0 pen.)	(Tasmania); Tassie Tigers
2025	Melbourne	(Western Australia); Perth Thundersticks	4–2	(Victoria (state)); HC Melbourne	(New South Wales); NSW Pride	3–2	(South Australia); Adelaide Fire
2026	Gold Coast						

=== Awards ===
Women's Statistics
Year	Player of the League	Highest Goalscorer(s)	Player of the Final	Fans Player of the Season
2019	Shihori Oikawa (Chill)	Madeleine Ratcliffe (Melbourne); Michaela Spano (Fire); Abigail Wilson (Pride)	Rosie Malone (Blaze)	Not Awarded
2022	Amy Lawton (Melbourne)	Grace Stewart (Pride)	Mariah Williams (Pride)	Not Awarded
2023	Kaitlin Nobbs (Pride)	Laura Reid (Pride)	Stephanie Kershaw (Blaze)	Not Awarded
2024	Gitte Michels (Tigers)	Lexie Pickering (Thundersticks)	Aleisha Power (Thundersticks)	Eva Drummond (Thundersticks)
2025	Greta Hayes (Fire)	Madeleine Ratcliffe (Thundersticks)	Karri Somerville (Thundersticks)	Amy Lawton (Chill)
2026		Zara Geddis (Cobras); Courtney Schonell (Thundersticks)		

=== Team Appearances ===
Team	2019	2022	2023	2024	2025	2026	Total
(South Australia) Adelaide Fire	3rd	6th	6th	7th	4th	8th	6
(Queensland) Brisbane Blaze	1st	2nd	1st	2nd	7th	5th	6
(Australian Capital Territory) Canberra Chill	4th	5th	2nd	6th	6th	6th	6
(Victoria (state)) HC Melbourne	2nd	4th	5th	5th	2nd	Q	6
(Victoria (state)) Melbourne Cobras	–	–	–	–	–	Q	1
(New South Wales) NSW Pride	6th	1st	4th	3rd	3rd	Q	6
(Western Australia) Perth Thundersticks	5th	3rd	3rd	1st	1st	Q	6
(Tasmania) Tassie Tigers	7th	7th	7th	4th	5th	7th	6
Total	7	7	7	7	7	8	

== One Hockey Cup ==
The One Hockey Cup, presents an opportunity to celebrate the combined performances of Men’s and Women’s teams from the 7 Hockey One League Franchises. The One Hockey Cup will be awarded to the Club that ranks highest based on the aggregate scores of their Women’s and Men’s teams at the end of the Regular Season (Rounds 1 – 7).

The One Hockey Cup table stands as a separate competition to the League, and as such, the following points system is applied only to the One Hockey Cup table, and not applied to the League Table/general team standings. The One Hockey Cup results will have no impact on the outcome of the Hockey One League.

1. Clubs will be ranked on the One Hockey Cup table, based on the aggregate scores of the Women’s and Men’s matches on each matchday during the Regular Season (Rounds 1 – 7).
1.1. matchday results will be awarded as wins, draws, or losses, based on the aggregate score achieved by one Club against another on a single matchday.
1.1.1. if a single match results in a draw, the Club that wins the shoot-out competition will receive one extra goal on their aggregate matchday goal total.

2. Points on the One Hockey Cup table will be awarded as follows, based on the aggregate score of both matches on a single matchday
2.1. five points to the winning Club;
2.2. two points to each Club, in the event of a draw;
2.3. Zero points to the loser.
2.4. In circumstances where a match is abandoned, such as under “12. Interruptions to a Match” and the result is deemed to be a draw, two points will be awarded to each team towards their Club’s total for that matchday.

3. At the end of the Regular Season (Rounds 1 – 7) Clubs will be ranked on the One Hockey Cup table according to the number of points each club has accumulated in the regular rounds of the Hockey One Competition.
3.1. If two or more clubs have the same number of points, these clubs will be ranked according to their respective number of matchdays won.
3.2. If there remains equality between two or more clubs, then these clubs will be ranked according to their respective goal difference (which means “goals for” less “goals against”).
3.3. If there remains equality among two or more clubs, then these teams will be ranked according to their respective number of “goals for”.
3.4. Should there remain equality among two clubs, then the results of the matches played between those clubs will determine the ranking of the tied clubs.
3.5. If more than two clubs are involved, then a ranking based upon the results of the matches (only) then shall determine their respective position, based on the points awarded in accordance with aforementioned Club Cup 2, 2.1, 2.2, 2.3, & 2.4
3.6 If there remains equality among two or more clubs, then these clubs will be ranked according to the number of Field Goals scored during the regular rounds.
3.7 If there remains equality among two or more clubs, then these clubs will share the relevant placing on the One Hockey Cup table.

=== Winners ===
One Hockey Cup Winners
Year	Winner
2023	(Queensland) Brisbane Blaze
2024	(Western Australia) Perth Thundersticks
2025	(New South Wales) NSW Pride
2026	(Victoria (state)) HC Melbourne

== Statistics ==
=== Leading scorers ===
All-Time Men's Top Scorers
Rank	Team	Player	Goals
1	(Queensland) Brisbane Blaze	Joel Rintala	43
2	(New South Wales) NSW Pride	Blake Govers	42
3	(Victoria (state)) HC Melbourne	Nathan Ephraums	30
4	(Australian Capital Territory) Canberra Chill	James Day	22
4	(Australian Capital Territory) Canberra Chill	Benjamin Staines	22
6	(Victoria (state)) HC Melbourne	Ky Willott	20
6	(Western Australia) Perth Thundersticks	Thomas Wickham	20
8	(Australian Capital Territory) Canberra Chill	Aiden Dooley	17
8	(Tasmania) Tassie Tigers	Ehren Hazell	17
10	(Queensland) Brisbane Blaze	Cale Cramer	16
10	(Queensland) Brisbane Blaze	Corey Weyer	16
10	(Victoria (state)) HC Melbourne	Cooper Burns	16
10	(New South Wales) NSW Pride	Timothy Brand	16
10	(Tasmania) Tassie Tigers	Jack Welch	16

All-Time Women's Top Scorers
Rank	Team	Player	Goals
1	(New South Wales) NSW Pride	Abigail Wilson	28
2	(Queensland) Brisbane Blaze	Savannah Fitzpatrick	20
2	(Western Australia) Perth Thundersticks	Lexie Pickering	20
2	(Western Australia) Perth Thundersticks	Madeleine Ratcliffe	20
5	(New South Wales) NSW Pride	Grace Stewart	18
6	(Victoria (state)) HC Melbourne	Hannah Cotter	16
6	(Western Australia) Perth Thundersticks	Liné Malan	16
8	(Australian Capital Territory) Canberra Chill	Naomi Evans	15
9	(South Australia) Adelaide Fire	Georgina Dowd	13
10	(South Australia) Adelaide Fire	Michaela Spano	11
10	(Western Australia) Perth Thundersticks	Courtney Schonell	11

== Media coverage ==
To promote the sport and engage fans, every match of the 2022 Hockey One League was broadcast live across Australia. All matches were broadcast live on Kayo Sports and in addition, all Thursday night double headers were broadcast on FOX Sports. Both Kayo and FOX Sports broadcast the finals series, held over a weekend in Bendigo on the 19th and 20th of November, 2022.

Prior to the 2023 season, Hockey Australia announced a new broadcast deal with the Seven Network, bringing the competition to their free streaming service 7plus in a multi-year deal.

== See also ==
- Hockey Australia
- Australian Hockey League
