= Hockey Australia =

Australian hockey organisation

Hockey Australia Limited
- Sport: Field hockey
- Jurisdiction: Australia
- Abbreviation: HA
- Founded: 2000
- Affiliation: FIH
- Affiliation date: 1925
- Regional affiliation: OHF
- Headquarters: Melbourne, Victoria
- President: Ross Sudano
- CEO: David Pryles
- Vice president(s): Patrick Hall; Sandra Sully
- Director: Brent Clark, Max Diamond, Sally Carbon, Joanne Scanlon, Craig Roberts, Colin Murphy
- Men's coach: Colin Batch
- Women's coach: Katrina Powell
- Sponsor: Australia Institute of Sport

Official website
- www.hockey.org.au
- (Australia)

Hockey Australia is an organisation that formed from the merger of the Australian Hockey Association and Women's Hockey Australia in 2000. It is the national body responsible for the promotion, development and administration of field hockey in Australia. Hockey Australia is a full member of the International Hockey Federation and comprises the State and Territory associations.

== History ==
The British Army has been credited with the spread of hockey throughout the world, but in Australia's case, the British Navy deserves the honours. In the late 1800s, Australia did not have a naval fleet of its own and relied upon the Royal Navy for the security of the coastline. The British Naval officers stationed in Australia taught the locals the game of hockey and laid the foundations for a sport which Australians have developed and mastered.

== National teams ==
Hockey Australia is the governing body that oversees Australia's National Teams.

- The Kookaburras (Men)
- The Hockeyroos (Women)
- The Burras (Under 21 Men)
- The Jillaroos (Under 21 Women)
- Australia women's national indoor hockey team
- Australia Men's national indoor hockey team

== Tournaments ==
Hockey Australia organises National Tournaments, at various levels. These are as follows:

- Australian Hockey League 1991–2018 (Men) 1991–2018 (Women), Replaced by Hockey One
- Hockey One 2019–present (Men & Women)
- National Championships Last Run in 1993 (Women) 1994 (Men), Replaced by AHL
- Under 21 National Championships
- Under 18 National Championships
- Under 16 National Championships
- Under 14 National Championships
- National Country Championships
- Veterans National Championships
- Under 14 Indoor National Championships
- Under 16 Indoor National Championships
- Under 18 Indoor National Championships
- Under 21 Indoor National Championships
- Opens Indoor National Championships

In August 2015, Hockey Australia announced its Indoor Australian Championships will be held in Wollongong in 2016 and 2017. The three-week festival of indoor hockey will be played at the Illawarra Hockey Centre, in Wollongong. Championships will be played in Open, Under 15, Under 18 and the Under 21 categories, as well as a new Under 13 event, over the 23 days. This is the first time all Australian Indoor Championships are held in one venue.

== Championship results ==
=== Men ===
The Australian Hockey League is the premier field hockey competition in Australia, it began in 1991, with its arrival the Open National Championships were discontinued.

| Year | Open | Under 21 | Under 18 (Under 16 until 1981, Under 17 from 1982–1991) | Under 16 (Under 15 from 1980–2023) | Under 14 (Under 13 til 2023) |
|---|---|---|---|---|---|
| 1925 | Victoria | | | | |
| 1926 | Victoria | | | | |
| 1927 | New South Wales | | | | |
| 1928 | South Australia | | | | |
| 1929 | Western Australia | | | | |
| 1930 | Victoria | | | | |
| 1931 | No Competition | | | | |
| 1932 | Queensland | | | | |
| 1933 | Queensland | | | | |
| 1934 | Queensland | | | | |
| 1935 | New South Wales | | | | |
| 1936 | Western Australia | | | | |
| 1937 | Queensland | | | | |
| 1938 | Western Australia | | | | |
| 1939 | Queensland | | | | |
| 1946 | Victoria | Western Australia | | | |
| 1947 | Queensland | Victoria | | | |
| 1948 | Queensland | Western Australia | | | |
| 1949 | New South Wales | Western Australia | | | |
| 1950 | Western Australia; Queensland | New South Wales | New South Wales | | |
| 1951 | New South Wales | Western Australia | New South Wales | | |
| 1952 | Western Australia | Western Australia | Western Australia | | |
| 1953 | New South Wales | Queensland | Western Australia | | |
| 1954 | Queensland | New South Wales | Western Australia | | |
| 1955 | Western Australia | New South Wales | Western Australia | | |
| 1956 | Western Australia | Queensland | Queensland | | |
| 1957 | New South Wales | New South Wales | Western Australia | | |
| 1958 | Western Australia | Queensland | Western Australia | | |
| 1959 | Queensland | New South Wales | Queensland | | |
| 1960 | Western Australia | New South Wales | Victoria | | |
| 1961 | Queensland | Queensland | New South Wales | | |
| 1962 | Western Australia | Western Australia | Western Australia | | |
| 1963 | Western Australia | Queensland | South Australia | | |
| 1964 | Western Australia | Queensland | New South Wales | | |
| 1965 | Western Australia | South Australia | South Australia | | |
| 1966 | Western Australia | Western Australia | New South Wales | | |
| 1967 | Western Australia | Western Australia | New South Wales | | |
| 1968 | Queensland | South Australia | Queensland | | |
| 1969 | Western Australia | New South Wales | New South Wales | | |
| 1970 | Western Australia | South Australia | Western Australia | | |
| 1971 | Victoria | South Australia | Queensland | | |
| 1972 | South Australia; Western Australia | Victoria | New South Wales | | |
| 1973 | Queensland | South Australia | Western Australia | | |
| 1974 | Western Australia | Western Australia | New South Wales | | |
| 1975 | Western Australia | South Australia | Victoria | | |
| 1976 | Western Australia | Queensland | Queensland | | |
| 1977 | Western Australia | Queensland | Victoria | | |
| 1978 | South Australia | Victoria | Queensland | | |
| 1979 | Western Australia | Victoria | Victoria | | |
| 1980 | South Australia | Victoria | New South Wales | Queensland | |
| 1981 | Western Australia | South Australia | Queensland | New South Wales | |
| 1982 | Western Australia | Western Australia | Queensland | Western Australia | |
| 1983 | Western Australia | Western Australia | New South Wales | Western Australia | |
| 1984 | Western Australia | New South Wales | Western Australia | New South Wales | |
| 1985 | Victoria | Victoria | New South Wales | New South Wales | |
| 1986 | Western Australia | Queensland | Queensland | Queensland | |
| 1987 | Western Australia | New South Wales | Victoria | Queensland | |
| 1988 | Victoria | Western Australia | Victoria | Queensland | |
| 1989 | New South Wales | Victoria | Queensland | New South Wales | |
| 1990 | New South Wales | New South Wales | Western Australia | Victoria | |
| 1991 | Western Australia | Queensland | Western Australia | New South Wales | |
| 1992 | Victoria | Victoria | Victoria | New South Wales | |
| 1993 | Not Held | Victoria | New South Wales | New South Wales | |
| 1994 | Queensland | Queensland | Victoria | Queensland | |
| 1995 | Discontinued | New South Wales | New South Wales | New South Wales | |
| 1996 | Discontinued | Western Australia | New South Wales | Western Australia | |
| 1997 | Discontinued | Queensland | Victoria | Victoria | |
| 1998 | Discontinued | Victoria | Western Australia | Queensland | |
| 1999 | Discontinued | Victoria | Victoria | Western Australia | |
| 2000 | Discontinued | Queensland | New South Wales | Northern Territory | |
| 2001 | Discontinued | Queensland | Queensland | Western Australia | |
| 2002 | Discontinued | Western Australia | Western Australia | Queensland | |
| 2003 | Discontinued | Victoria | Northern Territory | Victoria | Queensland |
| 2004 | Discontinued | New South Wales | Western Australia | Victoria | Queensland |
| 2005 | Discontinued | Western Australia | Western Australia | Queensland | Queensland |
| 2006 | Discontinued | Victoria | New South Wales | New South Wales | Queensland |
| 2007 | Discontinued | Victoria | Queensland | New South Wales | Victoria |
| 2008 | Discontinued | Queensland | Queensland | New South Wales | Victoria |
| 2009 | Discontinued | Queensland | Queensland | New South Wales | New South Wales |
| 2010 | Discontinued | Victoria | Queensland | New South Wales | New South Wales |
| 2011 | Discontinued | Western Australia | New South Wales | New South Wales | Victoria |
| 2012 | Discontinued | Queensland | New South Wales | New South Wales | New South Wales |
| 2013 | Discontinued | Queensland | Victoria | New South Wales | Victoria |
| 2014 | Discontinued | New South Wales | Queensland | New South Wales | New South Wales |
| 2015 | Discontinued | Victoria | Western Australia | Western Australia | Victoria Blue |
| 2016 | Discontinued | Victoria | Western Australia | Queensland | Victoria Blue |
| 2017 | Discontinued | New South Wales | New South Wales State | New South Wales State | Victoria Blue |
| 2018 | Discontinued | Tasmania | Victoria | Queensland Maroon | Western Australia Storm |
| 2019 | Discontinued | New South Wales | Queensland | Western Australia Gold | Victoria Venom |
| 2020 | Discontinued | Cancelled due to the COVID-19 Global Pandemic | | | |
| 2021 | Discontinued | Cancelled due to the COVID-19 Global Pandemic | New South Wales State | New South Wales State | Cancelled due to the COVID-19 Global Pandemic |
| 2022 | Discontinued | Western Australia | Western Australia Gold | Queensland Maroon | Victoria Venom |
| 2023 | Discontinued | Western Australia | Tasmania | Queensland Maroon | Western Australia Lightning |
| 2024 | Discontinued | Western Australia | Victoria | Queensland Maroon | Western Australia Gold |
| 2025 | Discontinued | | | Victoria | |

=== Women ===
| Year | Open | Under 21 | Under 18 (Under 19 1976-1983) | Under 16 (Under 15 from 2003-2023, Invitational til 2002) | Under 14 (Under 13 til 2023) |
|---|---|---|---|---|---|
| 1910 | New South Wales | | | | |
| 1911 | Tasmania | | | | |
| 1912 | New South Wales | | | | |
| 1913 | South Australia | | | | |
| 1914 | New South Wales | | | | |
| 1920 | Tasmania | | | | |
| 1921 | South Australia; Tasmania | | | | |
| 1922 | Tasmania | | | | |
| 1923 | South Australia | | | | |
| 1924 | New South Wales | | | | |
| 1925 | South Australia | | | | |
| 1926 | Victoria | | | | |
| 1927 | New South Wales | | | | |
| 1928 | New South Wales; Victoria | | | | |
| 1929 | Western Australia | | | | |
| 1931 | New South Wales | | | | |
| 1932 | Tasmania; Victoria | | | | |
| 1933 | Tasmania | | | | |
| 1934 | Tasmania | | | | |
| 1935 | Tasmania; Victoria | | | | |
| 1936 | New South Wales | | | | |
| 1937 | New South Wales | | | | |
| 1938 | Western Australia | | | | |
| 1939 | Western Australia | | | | |
| 1946 | Western Australia | | | | |
| 1947 | Western Australia | | | | |
| 1948 | New South Wales; Western Australia | | | | |
| 1949 | Western Australia | | | | |
| 1950 | Western Australia | | | | |
| 1951 | Western Australia | | | | |
| 1952 | Western Australia | | | | |
| 1953 | Western Australia | | | | |
| 1954 | New South Wales | | | | |
| 1955 | Western Australia | | | | |
| 1957 | Western Australia | | | | |
| 1958 | Western Australia | | | | |
| 1959 | Western Australia | | | | |
| 1960 | Western Australia | | | | |
| 1961 | Queensland | | | | |
| 1962 | Western Australia | | | | |
| 1963 | Western Australia | | | | |
| 1964 | Western Australia | | | | |
| 1965 | Western Australia; South Australia | | | | |
| 1966 | Western Australia | | | | |
| 1967 | Western Australia | | | | |
| 1968 | South Australia; Western Australia | | | | |
| 1969 | Western Australia | | | | |
| 1970 | South Australia; Western Australia | | | | |
| 1971 | Victoria | | | | |
| 1972 | Western Australia | | | | |
| 1973 | Western Australia | | | | |
| 1974 | Western Australia | | | | |
| 1975 | Western Australia | | Queensland | | |
| 1976 | Western Australia | | Queensland | | |
| 1977 | Western Australia | | New South Wales | | |
| 1978 | New South Wales; Queensland; Tasmania | | Queensland | | |
| 1979 | Western Australia | | Queensland; Western Australia | | |
| 1980 | Queensland | | Queensland | | |
| 1981 | Western Australia | | Queensland | | |
| 1982 | Western Australia | | Queensland | | |
| 1983 | Queensland | | Queensland | | |
| 1984 | New South Wales | Queensland | Queensland | | |
| 1985 | Western Australia | Western Australia | Western Australia | | |
| 1986 | Western Australia | New South Wales | New South Wales | | |
| 1987 | Western Australia; Queensland | Queensland | Queensland; Western Australia | | |
| 1988 | Western Australia | Western Australia | New South Wales | | |
| 1989 | Western Australia | New South Wales | Queensland | | |
| 1990 | Western Australia | Queensland | New South Wales; Queensland | | |
| 1991 | Western Australia | Queensland | Queensland; Victoria | | |
| 1992 | Queensland | Queensland | Queensland | | |
| 1993 | Queensland | Queensland | New South Wales | | |
| 1994 | Discontinued | Victoria | New South Wales | | |
| 1995 | Discontinued | Victoria | New South Wales; Queensland | | |
| 1996 | Discontinued | Victoria | Western Australia | | |
| 1997 | Discontinued | New South Wales | Western Australia | | |
| 1998 | Discontinued | Victoria | Victoria | | |
| 1999 | Discontinued | Victoria | Australian Capital Territory | | |
| 2000 | Discontinued | Queensland | Queensland | | |
| 2001 | Discontinued | South Australia | New South Wales | | |
| 2002 | Discontinued | New South Wales | Queensland | | |
| 2003 | Discontinued | Queensland | Queensland | New South Wales | |
| 2004 | Discontinued | Queensland | Victoria | New South Wales | |
| 2005 | Discontinued | Australian Capital Territory | New South Wales | Western Australia | Australian Capital Territory |
| 2006 | Discontinued | Queensland | Western Australia | New South Wales | New South Wales |
| 2007 | Discontinued | Queensland | New South Wales | New South Wales | Queensland |
| 2008 | Discontinued | Western Australia | New South Wales | Western Australia | Queensland |
| 2009 | Discontinued | Tasmania | New South Wales | New South Wales | New South Wales |
| 2010 | Discontinued | Victoria | Victoria | New South Wales | New South Wales |
| 2011 | Discontinued | Western Australia | Victoria | New South Wales | Queensland |
| 2012 | Discontinued | New South Wales | Queensland | New South Wales | Western Australia |
| 2013 | Discontinued | Queensland | New South Wales | New South Wales | New South Wales |
| 2014 | Discontinued | New South Wales | Queensland | New South Wales | New South Wales State |
| 2015 | Discontinued | Victoria | Queensland | Queensland | New South Wales State |
| 2016 | Discontinued | Queensland | Queensland | Queensland | Victoria Blue |
| 2017 | Discontinued | New South Wales | Queensland 1 | Victoria | Queensland Cinders |
| 2018 | Discontinued | New South Wales | New South Wales State | New South Wales State | New South Wales Lions |
| 2019 | Discontinued | Queensland | Queensland | Victoria | Queensland Cinders |
| 2020 | Discontinued | Cancelled due to the COVID-19 Global Pandemic | | | |
| 2021 | Discontinued | Cancelled due to the COVID-19 Global Pandemic | Queensland Maroon | New South Wales State | Cancelled due to the COVID-19 Global Pandemic |
| 2022 | Discontinued | Victoria | Queensland Gold | Queensland Maroon | Queensland Cinders |
| 2023 | Discontinued | New South Wales State | Queensland Maroon | Queensland Maroon | Queensland Cinders |
| 2024 | Discontinued | Queensland | Queensland Maroon | Queensland Maroon | Queensland Embers |
| 2025 | Discontinued | | | Queensland Maroon | |

=== Open National Championships ===
The Open National Championships were discontinued from 1992 for the Men (The men held a competition called the Kookaburra Cup in 1994) and 1994 for the Women. This coincided with the creation of the Australian Hockey League in 1991 (Men) and 1993 (Women) which became the flagship National Competition. In 2019 Hockey One was created to supersede the Australian Hockey League.

=== Under 21 National Championships ===
The Under 21 National Championships followed a full round-robin and semi-final (1st v 4th, 2nd v 3rd), winners play in the Gold Medal match until 2014.

Since 2014 these championships have operated with two pools of four teams, with the top two teams in each pool qualifying for the medal pool (1st-4th), and the bottom four teams qualifying for the classification pool (5th-8th).

Since 2018 the structure has changed slightly with every two pools of four teams. From there crossover quarterfinals occur with 1st place in Pool A playing 4th place from Pool B, 2nd in Pool A playing 3rd in Pool B and so on, this replicated the finals format from the World League. In the 2018 Men's Championship it meant that Tasmania who lost all three pool games were able to win three knockout matches and be crowned National Champions. Under the format from 2017, this would not have been possible.

=== Under 18 National Championships ===
The Under 18 National Championships followed a full round-robin and semi-final (1st v 4th, 2nd v 3rd), winners play in the Gold Medal match until 2014.

From 2014 onwards the championships have been contested by ten teams, with New South Wales and Victoria each fielding 2 teams, although in some cases it was Queensland and not Victoria. This required the creation of two pools of five teams each with crossover semi-finals of 1st in Pool A playing 2nd in Pool B and vice versa, the winners playing in the Gold medal match, loser playing for third place.

In 2016 the number of teams increased to eleven with the addition of a second Queensland team.

In 2022 this increased to 12 teams with the addition of a second team from Western Australia.

These four states' teams are selected as a First and Second team, these are their names: New South Wales State & New South Wales Blue Victoria & Victoria Development Queensland Maroon & Queensland Gold Western Australia Gold & Western Australia Black

=== Under 16 National Championships ===
In 2024, Hockey Australia shifted this age group to Under 16.

The Under 15 National Championships followed a full round-robin with the 1st and 2nd ranked teams to play in the Gold Medal match, 3rd and 4th placed teams playing for third place and so on, until 2009.

From 2010 to 2013 Hockey Australia did not play a finals series, so the winners were the teams ranked highest on the ladder after the round-robin competition.

In 2014 Hockey Australia increased the number of teams to twelve with the stronger states (New South Wales, Queensland, Victoria, Western Australia) fielding two teams each. This required the creation of two pools of six teams each with crossover semi-finals of 1st in Pool A playing 2nd in Pool B and vice versa, the winners playing in the Gold medal match, the loser playing for third place.

These four states' teams are selected as a First and Second team, these are their names: New South Wales State & New South Wales Blue Victoria & Victoria Development Queensland Maroon & Queensland Gold Western Australia Gold & Western Australia Black

=== Under 14 National Championship ===
In 2024, Hockey Australia shifted the age group to Under 14 and made it a National Championship, with a focus not just on participation, but also excellence. It followed a full round robin, but added a playoff game to the schedule (e.g. Final/Gold Medal is 1st v 2nd, Bronze Medal is 3rd v 4th etc...).

The Under 13 National Championship was included as a full National Championship from 2011 (with the inclusion of all States and Territories). Prior to this, an invitational event was run and sanctioned by Hockey Australia but did not hold National Championship status. There are no finals series and the Champion is the team ranked highest on the ladder at the conclusion of the competition.

In 2014 Hockey Australia increased the number of teams to 12 with the stronger states (New South Wales, Queensland, Victoria, Western Australia) fielding two teams each.

In 2015 Hockey Australia renamed this event as an Australian Carnival, with the stronger states (New South Wales, Queensland, Victoria, Western Australia) required to pick even teams in order to promote participation over elitism.
Despite this request Victoria continually picks a first and a second team as evidenced by their results (e.g. 2022 Boys Victoria Venom 1st, Victoria Volt 11th, 2019 Victoria Venom 1st, Victoria Volt 10th).
Other states have suggested averaging finishing positions to determine an Overall Winner (e.g. 2022 Boys, Western Australia should be crowned champions, with WA Lightning 2nd & WA Storm 3rd, equals an average of 2.5, Queensland Runners-Up, with Queensland Cutters 4th & Queensland Sabres 6th, equals an average of 5, Victoria in third place with Victoria Venom 1st & Victoria Volt 11th, equals an average of 6, and New South Wales in fourth place with NSW Lions 5th & NSW Stars 8th, equals an average of 6.5).
Matches are also shortened to 20-minute halves with a full round-robin, with teams required to often play double headers (two games) in one day.
In 2019 this was changed to four 10-minute quarters.

== See also ==
- Kookaburras – Australia men's national field hockey team
- Australia women's national field hockey team
- Australian field hockey players
- Indoor field hockey
- Indoor Hockey World Cup
- Australian Hockey League
- Hockey One
