= Field hockey at the 2007 Australian Youth Olympic Festival – Men's tournament =

Men's field hockey at the 2007 AYOF

Tournament details
- Host country: Australia
- City: Sydney
- Teams: 4
- Venue(s): Sydney Olympic Park

Final positions
- Champions: Australia (1st title)
- Runner-up: Great Britain
- Third place: China

Tournament statistics
- Matches played: 8
- Goals scored: 29 (3.63 per match)
- Top scorer(s): (Australia) Geoffrey Cock (6 goals)

The men's field hockey tournament at the 2007 Australian Youth Olympic Festival was the first edition of the field hockey tournament for men at the AYOF. The tournament was played from 17 to 21 January 2007 at the Sydney Olympic Park.

Australia won the tournament the inaugural tournament by defeating Great Britain 7–6 in a penalty shoot-out in the final, following a 2–2 draw. China won the bronze medal by defeating Malaysia 5–4, also in a penalty shoot-out following a 2–2 draw.

== Teams ==
- Australia
- China
- Great Britain
- Malaysia

== Results ==
=== Pool matches ===
Pos	Team	Pld	W	D	L	GF	GA	GD	Pts	Qualification
1	Australia	3	2	1	0	9	3	+6	7	Final
2	Great Britain	3	2	1	0	6	2	+4	7	Final
3	Malaysia	3	1	0	2	5	8	−3	3	Third and fourth
4	China	3	0	0	3	1	8	−7	0	Third and fourth

Source: AOC

17 January 2007
09:15

China	0–3	Great Britain
	Report	Cheesman 21'; Hardeep 36'; Jackson 53'

Sydney Olympic Park
Umpires:
Ben De Young
David Gilbert

17 January 2007
13:00

Australia	5–2	Malaysia
Cock 19', 40', 54'; Govers 35'; Kemp 56'	Report	Hafiq 48'; Baljit 65'

Sydney Olympic Park
Umpires:
Daniel Barstow
Stephen Rogers

18 January 2007
14:00

Malaysia	2–1	China
Nabil 43'; Hang 56'	Report	Wei 69'

Sydney Olympic Park
Umpires:
David Crandell
Ben De Young

18 January 2007
20:00

Great Britain	1–1	Australia
Cheesman 24'	Report	Cock 54'

Sydney Olympic Park
Umpires:
Dean Lawrence
Daniel Barstow

20 January 2007
09:00

Australia	3–0	China
Mirecki 40'; Burns 46'; Cock 51'	Report

Sydney Olympic Park
Umpires:
David Crandell
Dean Lawrence

20 January 2007
15:00

Malaysia	1–2	Great Britain
Baljit 40'	Report	Jackson 53', 57'

Sydney Olympic Park
Umpires:
Stephen Rogers
David Gilbert

=== Classification matches ===
==== Third and fourth place ====
21 January 2007
08:45

Malaysia	2–2	China
Nabil 2'; Razie 46'	Report	Sun 55'; Zhong 61'
Penalties
	4–5

Sydney Olympic Park
Umpires:
David Gilbert
David Crandell

==== Final ====
21 January 2007
12:30

Australia	2–2	Great Britain
Cock 39'; Govers 44'	Report	Jackson 37'; Griffiths 53'
Penalties
	7–6

Sydney Olympic Park
Umpires:
Stephen Rogers
Daniel Barstow

== Statistics ==
=== Final standings ===
As per statistical convention in field hockey, matches decided in extra time are counted as wins and losses, while matches decided by penalty shoot-outs are counted as draws.

Pos	Team	Pld	W	D	L	GF	GA	GD	Pts	Final result
1st place, gold medalist(s)	Australia	4	2	2	0	11	5	+6	8	Gold Medal
2nd place, silver medalist(s)	Great Britain	4	2	2	0	8	4	+4	8	Silver Medal
3rd place, bronze medalist(s)	China	4	0	1	3	3	10	−7	1	Bronze Medal
4	Malaysia	4	1	1	2	7	10	−3	4	Fourth place

Source: AOC
