= Field hockey at the 2007 Australian Youth Olympic Festival – Women's tournament =

Women's field hockey at the 2007 AYOF

Tournament details
- Host country: Australia
- City: Sydney
- Teams: 4
- Venue(s): Sydney Olympic Park

Final positions
- Champions: Great Britain (1st title)
- Runner-up: Australia
- Third place: New Zealand

Tournament statistics
- Matches played: 8
- Goals scored: 35 (4.38 per match)
- Top scorer(s): (Australia) Samantha Gale (5 goals)

The women's field hockey tournament at the 2007 Australian Youth Olympic Festival was the first edition of the field hockey tournament for women at the AYOF.

Great Britain won the tournament for the first time by defeating Australia 4–2 in the final. New Zealand won the bronze medal by defeating China 3–1 in the third-place playoff.

== Teams ==
- Australia
- China
- Great Britain
- New Zealand

== Results ==
=== Pool matches ===
Pos	Team	Pld	W	D	L	GF	GA	GD	Pts	Qualification
1	Australia	3	3	0	0	10	3	+7	9	Final
2	Great Britain	3	1	0	2	6	6	0	3	Final
3	New Zealand	3	1	0	2	6	7	−1	3	Third and fourth
4	China	3	1	0	2	3	9	−6	3	Third and fourth

Source: AOC

17 January 2007
09:00

China	1–4	Great Britain
Wang Y. 48'	Report	Craddock 9'; Hartley 40'; Quek 45'; Page 59'

Sydney Olympic Park
Umpires:
Kellie Walker
Aleeta Micallef

17 January 2007
11:00

Australia	4–2	New Zealand
Hurtz 17'; Denning 24'; Miller 40'; Gale 47'	Report	Michelsen 3'; Perry 30'

Sydney Olympic Park
Umpires:
Melanie Sowter
Debbie Brown

18 January 2007
18:00

New Zealand	1–2	China
Green 35'	Report	Xie 41', 48'

Sydney Olympic Park
Umpires:
Melanie Sowter
Sharni Barton

18 January 2007
18:00

Great Britain	1–2	Australia
Gilbert 34'	Report	Nelson 46'; Gale 68'

Sydney Olympic Park
Umpires:
Kellie Walker
Irene Clelland

20 January 2007
11:00

Australia	4–0	China
Miller 35'; Duay 42'; Nelson 57'; Gale 70'	Report

Sydney Olympic Park
Umpires:
Melanie Sowter
Irene Clelland

20 January 2007
13:00

New Zealand	3–1	Great Britain
Michelsen 12'; Finlayson 29'; Rowsell 32'	Report	Bartlett 17'

Sydney Olympic Park
Umpires:
Aleeta Micallef
Debbie Brown

=== Classification matches ===
==== Third and fourth place ====
21 January 2007
08:30

New Zealand	3–1	China
Maloney 44'; Perry 61', 63'	Report	Xing 69'

Sydney Olympic Park
Umpires:
Aleeta Micallef
Sharni Barton

==== Final ====
21 January 2007
10:30

Australia	2–4	Great Britain
Gale 15', 62'	Report	Brown 2'; Page 4', 44'; Craddock 54'

Sydney Olympic Park
Umpires:
Kellie Walker
Irene Clelland

== Statistics ==
=== Final standings ===
As per statistical convention in field hockey, matches decided in extra time are counted as wins and losses, while matches decided by penalty shoot-outs are counted as draws.

Pos	Team	Pld	W	D	L	GF	GA	GD	Pts	Final result
1st place, gold medalist(s)	Great Britain	4	2	0	2	10	8	+2	6	Gold Medal
2nd place, silver medalist(s)	Australia	4	3	0	1	12	7	+5	9	Silver Medal
3rd place, bronze medalist(s)	New Zealand	4	2	0	2	9	8	+1	6	Bronze Medal
4	China	4	1	0	3	4	12	−8	3	Fourth place

Source: AOC
