= Field hockey at the Australian Youth Olympic Festival =

Field Hockey at the Australian Youth Olympic Festival
- Sport: Field hockey
- Founded: M: 2007; W: 2007
- No. of teams: 4
- Country: Australia
- Continent: International (FIH)
- Most recent champions: M:Australia (3rd title); W:Australia (1st title)
- Most titles: M:Australia (3 titles); W:Great Britain (2 titles)
- Website: olympics.com.au

Hockey, or more specifically, field hockey, was first introduced to the Australian Youth Olympic Festival as a men's and women's tournament at the 2007 Games.

== History ==
After being introduced at the 2007 Australian Youth Olympic Festival, field hockey has become a permanent feature at every edition since.

Australia are the most successful team in the men's competition, having won gold at every edition of the tournament. Great Britain are the most successful women's team, having one the tournament twice, followed by Australia who have won the tournament once.

== Men's tournament ==
=== Summaries ===
Year	Hosts	Final			Third Place Match
Year	Hosts	Winners	Score	Runners-up	Third Place	Score	Fourth Place
2007; Details	Sydney, Australia	Australia	2–2 (7–6) (penalties)	Great Britain	China	2–2 (5–4) (penalties)	Malaysia
2009; Details	Sydney, Australia	Australia	2–1	India	Great Britain	5–2	Malaysia
2013; Details	Sydney, Australia	Australia	5–4	Great Britain	United States	4–4 (3–2) (penalties)	Malaysia

=== Team Appearances ===
Team	2007	2009	2013	Total
Australia	1st	1st	1st	3
China	3rd	–	–	1
Great Britain	2nd	3rd	2nd	3
India	–	2nd	–	1
Malaysia	4th	4th	4th	3
United States	–	–	3rd	1
Total	4	4	4	12

== Women's tournament ==
=== Summaries ===
Year	Hosts	Final			Third Place Match
Year	Hosts	Winners	Score	Runners-up	Third Place	Score	Fourth Place
2007; Details	Sydney, Australia	Great Britain	4–2	Australia	New Zealand	3–1	China
2009; Details	Sydney, Australia	Great Britain	3–2	Australia	India	2–0	United States
2013; Details	Sydney, Australia	Australia	2–1	China	Great Britain	2–1	United States

=== Team Appearances ===
Team	2007	2009	2013	Total
Australia	2nd	2nd	1st	3
China	4th	–	2nd	2
Great Britain	1st	1st	3rd	3
India	–	3rd	–	1
New Zealand	3rd	–	–	1
United States	–	4th	4th	2
Total	4	4	4	12

== Medal table ==
=== Total ===
Rank	Nation	Gold	Silver	Bronze	Total
1	Australia (AUS)	4	2	0	6
2	Great Britain (GBR)	2	2	2	6
3	China (CHN)	0	1	1	2
3	India (IND)	0	1	1	2
5	New Zealand (NZL)	0	0	1	1
5	United States (USA)	0	0	1	1
Totals (6 entries)		6	6	6	18

=== Men ===
Rank	Nation	Gold	Silver	Bronze	Total
1	Australia	3	0	0	3
2	Great Britain	0	2	1	3
3	India	0	1	0	1
4	China	0	0	1	1
4	United States	0	0	1	1
Totals (5 entries)		3	3	3	9

=== Women ===
Rank	Nation	Gold	Silver	Bronze	Total
1	Great Britain	2	0	1	3
2	Australia	1	2	0	3
3	China	0	1	0	1
4	India	0	0	1	1
4	New Zealand	0	0	1	1
Totals (5 entries)		3	3	3	9
