= Field hockey at the 2013 Australian Youth Olympic Festival – Men's tournament =

Men's field hockey at the 2013 AYOF

Tournament details
- Host country: Australia
- City: Sydney
- Dates: 16 – 20 January
- Teams: 4
- Venue: Sydney Olympic Park

Final positions
- Champions: Australia (3rd title)
- Runner-up: Great Britain
- Third place: United States

Tournament statistics
- Matches played: 8
- Goals scored: 61 (7.63 per match)
- Top scorer: (Australia) Jack Elliot (7 goals)

The men's field hockey tournament at the 2013 Australian Youth Olympic Festival was the third edition of the field hockey tournament for men at the AYOF, from 16 to 20 January 2013.

Australia won the tournament for the third time by defeating Great Britain 5–4 in the final. The champions remained undefeated throughout the tournament. The United States won the bronze medal by defeating Malaysia 3–2 in a penalty shoot-out following a 4–4 draw.

== Teams ==
- Australia
- Great Britain
- Malaysia
- United States

== Results ==
=== Pool matches ===
Pos	Team	Pld	W	D	L	GF	GA	GD	Pts	Qualification
1	Australia	3	3	0	0	16	5	+11	9	Final
2	Great Britain	3	2	0	1	17	9	+8	6	Final
3	Malaysia	3	1	0	2	10	11	−1	3	Third and fourth
4	United States	3	0	0	3	1	19	−18	0	Third and fourth

Source: FIH

16 January 2013
09:00

Great Britain	7–3	Malaysia
Bull 8'; Gilham-Jones 11', 48'; 14'; Drayton-Chana 19'; Hatherley 40'; Forsyth 53'	Report	Amirol 41'; Firhan 49'; Zulhairi 63'

Sydney Olympic Park
Umpires:
Benjamin Peters (USA)
Devendra Patel (NZL)

16 January 2013
11:00

Australia	7–0	United States
Joyce 20'; Knee 27'; Gilmour 28'; Wotherspoon 31'; Rintala 52'; Elliot 55'; Ogilvie 62'	Report

Sydney Olympic Park
Umpires:
Norazhar Bin Abidin (MAS)
Gavin Cruickshanks (GBR)

17 January 2013
15:00

United States	1–6	Malaysia
Groeneveld 13'	Report	Zulhairi 12'; Firhan 42', 48', 58', 61', 63'

Sydney Olympic Park
Umpires:
Stephen Versteegh (AUS)
Gavin Cruickshanks (GBR)

17 January 2013
19:00

Great Britain	4–6	Australia
Bull 3'; Gilham-Jones 27'; Faulkner 30'; Roper 55'	Report	Elliot 10', 16', 56'; Gilmour 30'; Wotherspoon 38'; Joyce 63'

Sydney Olympic Park
Umpires:
Norazhar Bin Abidin (MAS)
Devendra Patel (NZL)

19 January 2013
09:00

Australia	3–1	Malaysia
Elliot 15'; Gilmour 28'; Joyce 61'	Report	Amirol 68'

Sydney Olympic Park
Umpires:
Benjamin Peters (USA)
Devendra Patel (NZL)

19 January 2013
11:00

United States	0–6	Great Britain
	Report	Gilham-Jones 6'; French 25'; Roper 26', 47'; Bull 32'; Forsyth 55'

Sydney Olympic Park
Umpires:
Norazhar Bin Abidin (MAS)
Stephen Versteegh (AUS)

=== Classification matches ===
==== Third and fourth place ====
20 January 2013
10:30

Malaysia	4–4 (a.e.t.)	United States
Amirol 24'; Aminudin 46', 70'; Norsyafiq 67'	Report	Sundeen 2', 29'; Cicchi 31'; Zepada 50'
Penalties
Penalty shoot-out scored Penalty shoot-out missed	2–3	Penalty shoot-out scored

Sydney Olympic Park
Umpires:
Stephen Versteegh (AUS)
Gavin Cruickshanks (GBR)

==== Final ====
20 January 2013
11:00

Australia	5–4 (a.e.t.)	Great Britain
Elliot 10', 68'; Joyce 13'; Craig 23'; Gilmour 72'	Report	Gilham-Jones 38'; Roper 47'; Bull 57'; French 64'

Sydney Olympic Park
Umpires:
Devendra Patel (NZL)
Benjamin Peters (USA)

== Statistics ==
=== Final standings ===
As per statistical convention in field hockey, matches decided in extra time are counted as wins and losses, while matches decided by penalty shoot-outs are counted as draws.

Pos	Team	Pld	W	D	L	GF	GA	GD	Pts	Final result
1st place, gold medalist(s)	Australia	4	4	0	0	21	9	+12	12	Gold Medal
2nd place, silver medalist(s)	Great Britain	4	2	0	2	21	14	+7	6	Silver Medal
3rd place, bronze medalist(s)	United States	4	0	1	3	5	23	−18	1	Bronze Medal
4	Malaysia	4	1	1	2	14	15	−1	4	Fourth place

Source: FIH
