= Field hockey at the 2013 Australian Youth Olympic Festival – Women's tournament =

Women's field hockey at the 2013 AYOF

Tournament details
- Host country: Australia
- City: Sydney
- Dates: 16 – 20 January
- Teams: 4
- Venue(s): Sydney Olympic Park

Final positions
- Champions: Australia (1st title)
- Runner-up: China
- Third place: Great Britain

Tournament statistics
- Matches played: 8
- Goals scored: 32 (4 per match)
- Top scorer(s): (Australia) Madison Fitzpatrick (5 goals)

The Women's field hockey at the 2013 Australian Youth Olympic Festival was the third edition of the field hockey tournament for women at the AYOF.

Australia won the tournament for the first time by defeating China 2–1 in the final. Great Britain, which had been the champions in the first two editions of the tournament, won the bronze medal by defeating the United States 2–1 in the third-place playoff.

== Teams ==
- Australia
- China
- Great Britain
- United States

== Results ==
=== Pool matches ===
Pos	Team	Pld	W	D	L	GF	GA	GD	Pts	Qualification
1	Australia	3	2	1	0	8	3	+5	7	Final
2	China	3	2	1	0	8	4	+4	7	Final
3	Great Britain	3	1	0	2	6	5	+1	3	Third and fourth
4	United States	3	0	0	3	4	14	−10	0	Third and fourth

Source: FIH

16 January 2013
09:00

Great Britain	0–3	Australia
	Report	Allendorf 25'; Williams 33'; Fitzpatrick 68'

Sydney Olympic Park
Umpires:
Hong Chen (CHN)
Mary Driscoll (USA)

16 January 2013
11:00

China	5–2	United States
Zhang 7'; Liang 12', 41'; Peng 55'; Mengrong 64'	Report	Rhea 18'; Page 63'

Sydney Olympic Park
Umpires:
Kim Jung-Hee (KOR)
Joanna Forrest (GBR)

17 January 2013
13:00

China	2–1	Great Britain
Wang M. 53'; Wang N. 56'	Report	Owsley 27'

Sydney Olympic Park
Umpires:
Bernadette Pangrazio (AUS)
Kim Jung-Hee (KOR)

17 January 2013
17:00

Australia	4–2	United States
Fitzpatrick 34', 60', 66'; Slattery 59'	Report	Bozek 6', 28'

Sydney Olympic Park
Umpires:
Joanna Forrest (GBR)
Hong Chen (CHN)

19 January 2013
09:00

Great Britain	5–0	United States
Martin 7', 41'; Owsley 11'; McCallin 26'; Petty 58'	Report

Sydney Olympic Park
Umpires:
Bernadette Pangrazio (AUS)
Kim Jung-Hee (KOR)

19 January 2013
11:00

Australia	1–1	China
Holzberger 35'	Report	Liang 63'

Sydney Olympic Park
Umpires:
Joanna Forrest (GBR)
Mary Driscoll (USA)

=== Classification matches ===
==== Third and fourth place ====
20 January 2013
08:00

Great Britain	2–1 (a.e.t.)	United States
Martin 5', 78'	Report	Bolles 3'

Sydney Olympic Park
Umpires:
Bernadette Pangrazio (AUS)
Hong Chen (CHN)

==== Final ====
20 January 2013
08:30

Australia	2–1	China
Fitzpatrick 47'; Slattery 68'	Report	Zhang 13'

Sydney Olympic Park
Umpires:
Joanna Forrest (GBR)
Mary Driscoll (USA)

== Statistics ==
=== Final standings ===
As per statistical convention in field hockey, matches decided in extra time are counted as wins and losses, while matches decided by penalty shoot-outs are counted as draws.

Pos	Team	Pld	W	D	L	GF	GA	GD	Pts	Final result
1st place, gold medalist(s)	Australia	4	3	1	0	10	4	+6	10	Gold Medal
2nd place, silver medalist(s)	China	4	2	1	1	9	6	+3	7	Silver Medal
3rd place, bronze medalist(s)	Great Britain	4	2	0	2	8	6	+2	6	Bronze Medal
4	United States	4	0	0	4	5	16	−11	0	Fourth place

Source: FIH

=== Goalscorers ===
There were 32 goals scored in 8 matches, for an average of 4 goals per match.

5 goals

- (Australia) Madison Fitzpatrick

4 goals

- (United Kingdom) Hannah Martin

3 goals

- (China) Liang Meiyu

2 goals

- (Australia) Kathryn Slattery
- (China) Zhang Xiaoxue
- (United Kingdom) Lily Owsley
- (United States) Emma Bozek

1 goal

- (Australia) Murphy Allendorf
- (Australia) Jordyn Holzberger
- (Australia) Mariah Williams
- (China) Wu Mengrong
- (China) Wang Mengyu
- (China) Wang Na
- (China) Peng Yang
- (United Kingdom) Shona McCallin
- (United Kingdom) Suzannah Petty
- (United States) Marie Elena Bolles
- (United States) Jordan Page
- (United States) Taylor Rhea
