= Cameron Joyce =

Cameron Joyce may refer to:

- Cameron Joyce (field hockey)
- Cameron Joyce (coach)
