= Field hockey at the 2009 Australian Youth Olympic Festival – Men's tournament =

Men's field hockey at the 2009 Australian Youth Olympic Festival
Tournament details
- Host country: Australia
- City: Sydney
- Teams: 4
- Venue: Sydney Olympic Park

Final positions
- Champions: Australia (2nd title)
- Runner-up: India
- Third place: Great Britain

Tournament statistics
- Matches played: 8
- Goals scored: 46 (5.75 per match)
- Top scorer: (India) Diwakar Ram (7 goals)

The men's field hockey tournament at the 2009 Australian Youth Olympic Festival (AYOF) was the second edition of the men's field hockey competition at the AYOF. The tournament was played from 14 to 18 January 2009 at the Sydney Olympic Park.

Australia won the tournament for the second time, defeating India 2–1 in golden goal extra time.

== Competition format ==
The tournament featured the national under–21 teams of Great Britain, India, Malaysia, and the hosts, Australia, competing in a round-robin format, with each team playing the other. Three points were awarded for a win, one for a draw, and none for a loss.

At the conclusion of the pool stage, the top two teams contested the final, while the bottom two teams played off for third place.

== Teams ==
The following four teams competed for the title:

- Australia
- Great Britain
- India
- Malaysia

== Officials ==
The following umpires were appointed by the International Hockey Federation to officiate the tournament:

- Suketu Khabaria (SGP)
- Azmi Safar (MAS)
- Gurinder Singh Sangha (IND)
- Dane Stevenson (AUS)
- Paul Walker (GBR)

== Results ==
=== Preliminary round ===
==== Pool ====
| Pos | Team | Pld | W | D | L | GF | GA | GD | Pts | Qualification |
|---|---|---|---|---|---|---|---|---|---|---|
| 1 | India | 3 | 2 | 1 | 0 | 13 | 7 | +6 | 7 | Advanced to Final |
| 2 | Australia | 3 | 2 | 0 | 1 | 6 | 5 | +1 | 6 | Advanced to Final |
| 3 | Malaysia | 3 | 0 | 2 | 1 | 10 | 11 | −1 | 2 | |
| 4 | Great Britain | 3 | 0 | 1 | 2 | 7 | 13 | −6 | 1 | |

Source: AYOF
Rules for classification: 1) Points; 2) Goal difference; 3) Goals scored; 4) Games won; 5) Head-to-head.

==== Fixtures ====
14 January 2009
09:00

| Great Britain | 4–4 | Malaysia |
|---|---|---|
| Scanlon 26'; Bain 65'; McIntyre 67'; Prosser 70' | Report | Azammi 31'; Makbul 32'; Abdul 52', 66' |

Umpires:
Dane Stevenson (AUS)
Gurinder Singh Sangha (IND)

14 January 2009
11:00

| Australia | 1–2 | India |
|---|---|---|
| T. White 66' | Report | Mandeep 11'; Diwakar 25' |

Umpires:
Azmi Safar (MAS)
Suketu Khabaria (SGP)

15 January 2009
16:00

| India | 6–1 | Great Britain |
|---|---|---|
| Diwakar 7', 16'; Danish 26'; Pramod 38', 46', 66' | Report | Catlin 65' |

Umpires:
Suketu Khabaria (SGP)
Dane Stevenson (AUS)

15 January 2009
20:00

| Malaysia | 1–2 | Australia |
|---|---|---|
| Abdul 15' | Report | Ellis 44'; Govers 60' |

Umpires:
Gurinder Singh Sangha (IND)
Paul Walker (GBR)

17 January 2009
09:00

| Australia | 3–2 | Great Britain |
|---|---|---|
| Mitton 25'; Donohoe 42'; West 64' | Report | Bain 39', 55' |

Umpires:
Gurinder Singh Sangha (IND)
Azmi Safar (MAS)

17 January 2009
15:00

| India | 5–5 | Malaysia |
|---|---|---|
| Karan 9'; Diwakar 19', 24', 61', 67' | Report | Abdul 7', 33'; Tengku 21'; Makbul 39'; Azwan 39' |

Umpires:
Paul Walker (GBR)
Suketu Khabaria (SGP)

=== Classification round ===
==== Third and fourth place ====
18 January 2009
08:00

| Malaysia | 2–5 | Great Britain |
|---|---|---|
| Kartik 24'; Faizal 40' | Report | Bain 16'; Scanlon 19'; Gregg 32', 55'; Faulkner 49' |

Umpires:
Dane Stevenson (AUS)
Suketu Khabaria (SGP)

==== Final ====
18 January 2009
13:00

| India | 1–2 | Australia |
|---|---|---|
| Pramod 55' | Report | Govers 3'; Donohoe 76' |

Umpires:
Azmi Safar (MAS)
Paul Walker (GBR)

== Statistics ==
=== Final standings ===
As per statistical convention in field hockey, matches decided in extra time are counted as wins and losses, while matches decided by penalty shoot-outs are counted as draws.

| Pos | Team | Pld | W | D | L | GF | GA | GD | Pts | Final result |
|---|---|---|---|---|---|---|---|---|---|---|
| 1st place, gold medalist(s) | Australia | 4 | 3 | 0 | 1 | 8 | 6 | +2 | 9 | Gold Medal |
| 2nd place, silver medalist(s) | India | 4 | 2 | 1 | 1 | 14 | 9 | +5 | 7 | Silver Medal |
| 3rd place, bronze medalist(s) | Great Britain | 4 | 1 | 1 | 2 | 12 | 15 | −3 | 4 | Bronze Medal |
| 4 | Malaysia | 4 | 0 | 2 | 2 | 12 | 16 | −4 | 2 | Fourth place |

Source: AYOF

=== Goalscorers ===
There were 46 goals scored in 8 matches, for an average of 5.75 goals per match.

7 goals

- (India) Diwakar Ram

5 goals

- (Malaysia) Abdul Gaffar

4 goals

- (India) Pramod Kumar
- (United Kingdom) Kenneth Bain

2 goals

- (Australia) Jason Donohoe
- (Australia) Kieran Govers
- (United Kingdom) Christopher Gregg
- (United Kingdom) Martin Scanlon
- (Malaysia) Makbul Singh

1 goal

- (Australia) Justin Ellis
- (Australia) Trent Mitton
- (Australia) Toby West
- (Australia) Tristan White
- (India) Mandeep Antil
- (India) Jay Karan
- (India) Danish Mujtaba
- (United Kingdom) Nicholas Catlin
- (United Kingdom) Simon Faulkner
- (United Kingdom) Gordon McIntyre
- (United Kingdom) Lewis Prosser
- (Malaysia) Azammi Ababi
- (Malaysia) Kartik Govindasamy
- (Malaysia) Azwan Hamid
- (Malaysia) Faizal Saari
- (Malaysia) Tengku Ahmad Tajuddin
