= 2013 Under 21 Men's Australian Hockey Championships =

Tournament details
- Host country: Australia
- City: Brisbane
- Teams: 8
- Venue: Queensland State Hockey Centre

Final positions
- Champions: (Queensland) QLD
- Runner-up: (New South Wales) NSW
- Third place: (Victoria (state)) VIC

Tournament statistics
- Matches played: 36
- Goals scored: 204 (5.67 per match)
- Top scorer: (New South Wales) Blake Govers (17 goals)
- Best player: (Queensland) Kane Posselt

The 2013 Under 21 Men's Australian Hockey Championships was a men's field hockey tournament held in Brisbane, Queensland, Australia.

Queensland won the gold medal after defeating New South Wales 3–2 in the final. Victoria won the bronze medal by defeating South Australia 3–1 in the third and fourth playoff.

== Competition format ==
The tournament is played in a round robin format, with each team facing each other once. Final placings after the pool matches determine playoffs.

The bottom four teams play in the classification round. Two crossover matches are played, with the fifth placed team playing the eighth place team and the sixth placed team facing the seventh placed team. The winners of the crossover matches progress to the fifth and sixth place playoff, while the losers contest the seventh and eighth place playoff.

The top four teams contest the medal round. Two semi-finals are played, with the first placed team taking on the fourth placed team and the second placed team taking on the third placed team. The winners progress to the final, while the losers contest the third and fourth place playoff.

== Teams ==
- (Australian Capital Territory) ACT
- (South Australia) SA
- (New South Wales) NSW
- (Tasmania) TAS
- (Northern Territory) NT
- (Victoria (state)) VIC
- (Queensland) QLD
- (Western Australia) WA

== Results ==
=== Preliminary round ===
Pos	Team	Pld	W	D	L	GF	GA	GD	Pts	Qualification
1	(Queensland) QLD	7	7	0	0	42	4	+38	21	Semi-finals
2	(New South Wales) NSW	7	6	0	1	38	19	+19	18	Semi-finals
3	(Victoria (state)) VIC	7	5	0	2	26	10	+16	15	Semi-finals
4	(South Australia) SA	7	2	2	3	18	22	−4	8	Semi-finals
5	(Northern Territory) NT	7	2	1	4	20	26	−6	7	
6	(Western Australia) WA	7	2	1	4	13	22	−9	7	
7	(Tasmania) TAS	7	2	0	5	13	31	−18	6	
8	(Australian Capital Territory) ACT	7	0	0	7	4	40	−36	0	

Source: Hockey Australia

==== Pool matches ====
2 April 2013
09:00

NT (Northern Territory)	3–5	(Tasmania) TAS
Mathiesen 19'; Hayward 43'; Govers 50'	Report	Arthur 2', 64'; White 8'; Middleton 54'; Kruger 70'

Stadium:
Queensland State Hockey Centre

2 April 2013
11:00

ACT (Australian Capital Territory)	0–6	(Western Australia) WA
	Report	Main 13'; Benfell 34'; Geers 40'; Brown 46'; Andersson 49'; Spencer 55'

Stadium:
Queensland State Hockey Centre

2 April 2013
13:00

VIC (Victoria (state))	1–2	(Queensland) QLD
Seccull 47'	Report	Rintala 16'; Latham 70'

Stadium:
Queensland State Hockey Centre

2 April 2013
15:00

NSW (New South Wales)	7–2	(South Australia) SA
Govers 2', 3', 23', 66'; Elliot 67', 69'; Bourke 68'	Report	Johns 17'; Gill 55'

Stadium:
Queensland State Hockey Centre

3 April 2013
09:00

WA (Western Australia)	0–3	(Victoria (state)) VIC
	Report	Cowley 4'; Bretherton 28'; Hammond 62'

Stadium:
Queensland State Hockey Centre

3 April 2013
11:00

NT (Northern Territory)	1–5	(Queensland) QLD
Taylor 39'	Report	Hathaway 13', 65'; Tyne 14'; Rintala 30', 61'

Stadium:
Queensland State Hockey Centre

3 April 2013
13:00

SA (South Australia)	4–3	(Tasmania) TAS
Casey 33'; Gill 41'; Johns 43'; Edge 70'	Report	Middleton 44'; Smith 51'; Arthur 56'

Stadium:
Queensland State Hockey Centre

3 April 2013
15:00

NSW (New South Wales)	6–1	(Australian Capital Territory) ACT
Elliot 6'; Dawson 9', 54'; Eichhorn 35'; Bourke 39', 49'	Report	Mosslar 3'

Stadium:
Queensland State Hockey Centre

4 April 2013
09:00

QLD (Queensland)	5–1	(South Australia) SA
Posselt 16', 48'; Douglas 42'; Boyde 57'; Wotherspoon 64'	Report	Casey 50'

Stadium:
Queensland State Hockey Centre

4 April 2013
11:00

NT (Northern Territory)	4–3	(Western Australia) WA
Hayward 28', 46'; Mathiesen 28'; O'Beirne 41'	Report	12'; Robertson 67', 68'

Stadium:
Queensland State Hockey Centre

4 April 2013
13:00

NSW (New South Wales)	4–2	(Victoria (state)) VIC
Dawson 2'; Govers 23'; Ogilvie 65'; Hayes 66'	Report	Arunasalam 6'; Kershaw 23'

Stadium:
Queensland State Hockey Centre

4 April 2013
15:00

TAS (Tasmania)	1–0	(Australian Capital Territory) ACT
Mackey 32'	Report

Stadium:
Queensland State Hockey Centre

6 April 2013
14:00

SA (South Australia)	7–1	(Australian Capital Territory) ACT
Joyce 5', 43', 49'; Cameron 22', 46'; Oliver 38'; Keeves 70'	Report	Day 35'

Stadium:
Queensland State Hockey Centre

6 April 2013
16:00

VIC (Victoria (state))	3–2	(Northern Territory) NT
Gilmour 32'; Arunasalam 70'; Seccull 70'	Report	Gleeson 42'; Lockley 46'

Stadium:
Queensland State Hockey Centre

6 April 2013
18:00

QLD (Queensland)	5–0	(Western Australia) WA
Boyde 5'; Bell 8'; Wotherspoon 50', 51'; Borger 69'	Report

Stadium:
Queensland State Hockey Centre

6 April 2013
20:00

NSW (New South Wales)	5–3	(Tasmania) TAS
Govers 2', 61', 70'; McEwen 4'; Hayes 45'	Report	Arthur 4'; Isles 21'; Read 35'

Stadium:
Queensland State Hockey Centre

7 April 2013
14:00

NT (Northern Territory)	4–1	(Australian Capital Territory) ACT
Mathiesen 23', 41'; Hayward 43'; O'Beirne 70'	Report	Martin 9'

Stadium:
Queensland State Hockey Centre

7 April 2013
17:15

VIC (Victoria (state))	3–1	(South Australia) SA
Gilmour 3', 27'; Arunasalam 42'	Report	Joyce 70'

Stadium:
Queensland State Hockey Centre

7 April 2013
19:15

TAS (Tasmania)	0–3	(Western Australia) WA
	Report	Spencer 3'; Robertson 56'; Lim 57'

Stadium:
Queensland State Hockey Centre

7 April 2013
21:15

QLD (Queensland)	7–0	(New South Wales) NSW
Latham 28', 40'; Douglas 30'; Wothersoon 38'; Posselt 50'; Hathaway 57'; Gildea 57'	Report

Stadium:
Queensland State Hockey Centre

9 April 2013
09:00

WA (Western Australia)	0–9	(New South Wales) NSW
	Report	Govers 8', 17', 27', 55', 67'; Eichhorn 40'; Elliot 43'; Bourke 48'; Craig 60'

Stadium:
Queensland State Hockey Centre

9 April 2013
11:00

TAS (Tasmania)	0–12	(Queensland) QLD
	Report	Posselt 5', 61'; Boyde 18', 37', 57'; Hathaway 22', 65'; Borger 32'; Wotherspoon 44', 64'; Gildea 56'; Douglas 58'

Stadium:
Queensland State Hockey Centre

9 April 2013
13:00

ACT (Australian Capital Territory)	0–10	(Victoria (state)) VIC
	Report	Steinfort 8'; Seccull 18', 24'; Arunasalam 19', 37', 40'; Bretherton 30'; Sherren 34'; Gilmour 43'; Walton 52'

Stadium:
Queensland State Hockey Centre

9 April 2013
15:00

SA (South Australia)	2–2	(Northern Territory) NT
Edge 61'; Gregory 70'	Report	Hayward 41'; O'Beirne 67'

Stadium:
Queensland State Hockey Centre

10 April 2013
11:00

TAS (Tasmania)	1–4	(Victoria (state)) VIC
Arthur 65'	Report	Cowley 2'; Gilmour 11', 49'; Sherren 57'

Stadium:
Queensland State Hockey Centre

10 April 2013
13:00

QLD (Queensland)	6–1	(Australian Capital Territory) ACT
Gildea 15'; Hathaway 18'; Borger 20'; Wotherspoon 25'; Posselt 30'; Rintala 54'	Report	Randell 68'

Stadium:
Queensland State Hockey Centre

10 April 2013
15:00

NSW (New South Wales)	7–4	(Northern Territory) NT
Tran 27'; Bourke 31'; Craig 48', 50', 55'; Hayes 61'; Hill 64'	Report	O'Beirne 30'; Govers 60'; Lockley 64'; Mathiesen 68'

Stadium:
Queensland State Hockey Centre

10 April 2013
15:00

WA (Western Australia)	1–1	(South Australia) SA
Spencer 1'	Report	Joyce 70'

Stadium:
Queensland State Hockey Centre

=== Classification round ===
==== Fifth to eighth place classification ====
Crossover
12 April 2013
(Northern Territory) NT	2
(Australian Capital Territory) ACT	0
12 April 2013
(Western Australia) WA	1
(Tasmania) TAS	1

Fifth place
13 April 2013
(Northern Territory) NT	2
(Western Australia) WA	2
Seventh place
13 April 2013
(Australian Capital Territory) ACT	0
(Tasmania) TAS	0

==== First to fourth place classification ====
Semi-finals
12 April 2013
(Queensland) QLD	5
(South Australia) SA	1
12 April 2013
(New South Wales) NSW	6
(Victoria (state)) VIC	5

Final
13 April 2013
(Queensland) QLD	3
(New South Wales) NSW	2
Third place
13 April 2013
(South Australia) SA	1
(Victoria (state)) VIC	3

===== Final =====
7 April 2013
17:00

QLD (Queensland)	3–2	(New South Wales) NSW
Wothersoon; Posselt 35+'; Rintala	Report	Elliot 29'; Govers

Stadium:
Queensland State Hockey Centre
