= Cameron Joyce (field hockey) =

Australian field hockey player

Personal information
- Born: 6 June 1992 (age 34) Port Pirie, South Australia

Sport
- Sport: Field hockey
- Position: Defender
- Club: Port Adelaide District Hockey Club
Senior career
Years	Team	Caps	Goals
2012–2015	SA Hotshots	27	9
2019–	Adelaide Fire	1	0
National team
Years	Team	Caps	Goals
2011–2013	Australia U–21	29	(11)
Medal record
Men's field hockey
Representing Australia U–21
Sultan of Johor Cup
Silver medal – second place	2011 Johor Bahru	Team
Junior Oceania Cup
Gold medal – first place	2013 Gold Coast	Team

Cameron Joyce (born 6 June 1992) is a field hockey player from Australia.

== Personal life ==
Cameron Joyce was born and raised in Port Pirie, South Australia.

== Career ==
=== Club level ===
Throughout his junior career, Joyce played hockey for Risdon Hockey Club in Port Pirie. Following his move to Adelaide, South Australia, Joyce began playing for Port Adelaide District Hockey Club in Hockey SA's Premier League competition.

=== State level ===
Joyce plays representative hockey for his home state, South Australia in National Australian Championships.

His last representation at junior level was at the 2013 Under–21 Australian Championship in Brisbane. In 2015, he represented the SA Hotshots for the last time in the Australian Hockey League in Darwin.

In 2019, Joyce represented South Australia for the first time in four years during the inaugural tournament of Hockey Australia's new domestic national league, Hockey One. He is a member of SA's team, the Adelaide Fire.

=== National level ===
Cameron Joyce was a member of the Australia U–21 national team, the 'Burras', from 2011 to 2013. During his junior national career, Joyce captained the team twice in 2013, at the AYOF and Junior Oceania Cup, winning gold at both.

Joyce last represented the Burras at the 2013 Junior World Cup, where the team finished fifth.
