= 2013 Australian Youth Olympic Festival =

Athletic Event

Australian Youth Olympic Festival 2013
- Host city: Sydney, NSW
- Nations: 30
- Athletes: 1700
- Events: 17 sports (201 events)
- Opening: 16 January 2013
- Closing: 20 January 2013
- Main venue: Sydney Entertainment Centre

The 2013 Australian Youth Olympic Festival was the fifth edition of the Australian Youth Olympic Festival. It was held from 16–20 January 2013.

== Participant nations ==
There were 30 teams that participated in the games. They were:

- Australia (AUS)
- Brazil (BRA)
- Bulgaria (BUL)
- Canada (CAN)
- China (CHN)
- Ecuador (ECU)
- Fiji (FIJ)
- Great Britain (GBR)
- Hong Kong (HKG)
- Hungary (HUN)
- Indonesia (INA)
- International Triathlon Union (ITU)
- Japan (JPN)
- Kazakhstan (KAZ)
- Malaysia (MAS)
- Netherlands (NED)
- Norway (NOR)
- New Zealand (NZL)
- Combined Oceania (OCA)
- South Africa (RSA)
- Singapore (SIN)
- Tonga (TGA)
- Chinese Taipei (TPE)
- United States (USA)
- Vanuatu (VAN)
- Venezuela (VEN)
- Zimbabwe (ZIM)

== Events ==
In 2013, the AYOF had 18 disciplines. These were:

- Athletics (20)
- Badminton (6)
- Basketball (2)
- Canoeing
  - Slalom (4)
  - Sprint (12)
- Cycling (12)
- Diving (8)
- Golf (3)
- Gymnastics (14)
- Hockey (2)
- Judo (10)
- Rowing (12)
- Rugby sevens (2)
- Shooting (14)
- Swimming (32)
- Triathlon (3)
- Weightlifting (8)
- Wrestling (8)

== Rugby sevens ==
=== Men's ===
Preliminary matches
Pos	Team	Pld	W	D	L	PF	PA	PD
1	South Africa	4	4	0	0	197	12	+185
2	Australia	4	3	0	1	161	42	+119
3	Tonga	4	2	0	2	80	57	+23
4	Japan	4	1	0	3	34	144	−110
5	China	4	0	0	4	5	222	−217

==== Playoffs ====
Qualifying finals
3	Tonga	7
4	Japan	5
5	China	0
2	Australia	64

Semifinals
1	South Africa	68
4	Japan	0
3	Tonga	5
2	Australia	47

Final
1	South Africa	22
2	Australia	7
Third place
3	Tonga	26
4	Japan	0

=== Women's ===
Preliminary matches
Pos	Team	Pld	W	D	L	PF	PA	PD
1	Australia	4	4	0	0	164	17	+147
2	China	4	3	1	1	103	52	+51
3	South Africa	4	2	2	2	45	125	−80
4	Japan	4	1	3	3	80	59	+21
5	Tonga	4	0	4	4	12	151	−139

==== Playoffs ====
Qualifying finals
3	South Africa	14
4	Japan	17
5	Tonga	0
2	China	41

Semifinals
1	Australia	38
3	South Africa	7
4	Japan	0
2	China	5

Final
1	Australia	40
2	China	0
Third place
4	Japan	27
3	South Africa	0
