= 2007 Australian Youth Olympic Festival =

- Host city: Sydney, New South Wales
- Opening: 17 January 2007
- Closing: 21 January 2007
- Main venue: Sydney Entertainment Centre

The 2007 Australian Youth Olympic Festival was the fourth edition of the Australian Youth Olympic Festival. It was held from 17 to 21 January 2007.

== Participant nations ==
Of the 23 countries invited, 20 of them participated in the games. They were:

- Australia
- Canada
- China
- Fiji
- France
- Germany
- Great Britain
- Hong Kong
- Hungary
- Japan
- Korea
- Malaysia
- New Caledonia
- New Zealand
- Oceania
- Singapore
- South Africa
- Taipei
- United States of America
- Uzbekistan

== Opening ceremony ==
The opening ceremony was performed all by primary school and high school students from NSW government schools. Singers and instrumentalists were chosen from outstanding performers from Schools Spectacular 2006.

== Events ==
In 2007, the AYOF had 14 sports (20 disciplines). These were:

- Aquatics
  - Diving
  - Swimming
- Athletics (track and field)
- Badminton
- Canoeing
  - Canoe/Kayak – Slalom
  - Canoe/Kayak – Sprint
- Cycling
  - Cycling – Road
  - Cycling – Track
- Football
- Gymnastics
  - Artistic
  - Rhythmic
  - Trampoline
- Hockey
- Sailing
- Rowing
- Shooting
- Skating
  - Figure skating
  - Short track
- Table tennis
- Taekwondo

== Athletics ==
Athletics medal tally
Team	Gold	Silver	Bronze	Total
Australia	27	25	33	85
China	10	5	3	18
Chinese Taipei	3	4	2	9
New Zealand	0	6	2	8
Total	40	40	40	120

There were 40 events contested at an 18 and under age limit:

Men:
Women:
- 100 m
- 200 m
- 400 m
- 800 m
- 1500 m
- 3000 m
- 110 m hurdles
- 2000 m steeplechase
- 4×100 m relay
- 4×400 m relay
- 400 m hurdles
- 5000 metres race walk
- High jump
- Long jump
- Triple jump
- Pole vault
- Shot put
- Discus
- Hammer
- Javelin
- 100 m
- 200 m
- 400 m
- 800 m
- 1500 m
- 3000 m
- 100 m hurdles
- 2000 m steeplechase
- 4×100 m relay
- 4×400 m relay
- 400 m hurdles
- 5000 metres race walk
- High jump
- Long jump
- Triple jump
- Pole vault
- Shot put
- Discus
- Hammer
- Javelin

== Figure skating ==
Figure skaters competed in men's and ladies single skating events held on 19 and 20 January 2007 in the Sydney Ice Arena in Sydney.

=== Men ===
Rank	Name	Nation	Points	SP	FS
1	Guan Junlin	China	161.37	1	1
2	Akio Sasaki	Japan	145.80	3	2
3	Yukihiro Yoshida	Japan	135.64	4	3
4	Naoto Saito	Japan	124.42	2	5
5	Matthew Parr	United Kingdom	120.74	5	4
6	Jason Thompson	United Kingdom	112.31	6	6
7	Nicholas Fernandez	Australia	96.03	8	7
8	Mark Webster	Australia	95.70	7	8
9	Mathew Tinson	Australia	83.59	9	9
10	Mathieu Wilson	New Zealand	76.44	10	10
11	Cameron Hems	New Zealand	75.22	11	11
12	Hung Wen Tien	Chinese Taipei	67.69	12	12
WD	Yang Chao	China		13	

- WD = Withdrawn

=== Ladies ===
Rank	Name	Nation	Points	SP	FS
1	Yuka Ishikawa	Japan	123.44	1	1
2	Nanoha Sato	Japan	113.70	4	2
3	Tina Wang	Australia	110.49	3	3
4	Vanessa James	United Kingdom	109.35	2	5
5	Yurina Nobuhara	Japan	108.12	5	4
6	Cheltzie Lee	Australia	98.21	6	6
7	Guo Yalu	China	86.78	8	7
8	Morgan Figgins	New Zealand	77.88	7	10
9	Phoebe Di Tommaso	Australia	77.30	9	8
10	Lejeanne Marais	South Africa	74.31	10	9
11	Jessica Wai	Chinese Taipei	62.40	11	11
12	Megan Allely	South Africa	56.15	12	12

== Rowing ==
Rowing medal tally
Team	Gold	Silver	Bronze	Total
Great Britain	6	5	1	12
Tasmania	2	1	0	3
New South Wales	1	4	0	5
New Zealand	1	1	5	7
China	1	1	1	3
Western Australia	1	0	3	4
Victoria	0	0	2	2

The rowing events were contested at the Sydney International Regatta Centre in Penrith; the site of the rowing for the 2000 Summer Olympics.

Unlike most AYOF events, the rowing offered each Australian state the chance to compete separately against countries including the Great Britain, New Zealand and China. Although the Great Britain and New Zealand teams had recent success at the Junior Rowing World Championships and Under 23 Rowing World Championships, the Australian states still performed competitively. The New South Wales rowing team won the premier event, the Men's Eight.

Great Britain led the way with a total of 6 Gold Medals. The Australian state crews performed admirably with New South Wales, Victoria, Tasmania and Western Australia sharing 14 medals between them.

== See also ==
- Rowing at the 2007 Australian Youth Olympic Festival
- 2007 European Youth Summer Olympic Festival
