= Australian Youth Olympic Festival =

Australian international multi-sport event

AYOF logo

The Australian Youth Olympics Festival (AYOF) is an international multi-sport event organised by the Australian Olympic Committee for athletes from 13 to 19 years of age. The first event was held in 2001.

== Editions ==
1. 2001 Australian Youth Olympic Festival
2. 2003 Australian Youth Olympic Festival
3. 2005 Australian Youth Olympic Festival
4. 2007 Australian Youth Olympic Festival
5. 2013 Australian Youth Olympic Festival

== Competing nations ==
- Australia (AUS)
- Brazil (BRA)
- Canada (CAN)
- China (CHN)
- Fiji (FIJ)
- Great Britain (GBR)
- Hungary (HUN)
- Indonesia (INA)
- International Triathlon Union
- Japan (JPN)
- Malaysia (MAS)
- Netherlands (NED)
- New Zealand (NZL)
- Combined Oceania
- Singapore (SIN)
- South Africa (RSA)
- Chinese Taipei (Taiwan)
- Tonga (TGA)
- United States (USA)
- Vanuatu (VAN)

== Sports ==
- Athletics (track and field)
- Badminton
- Basketball
- Canoe/Kayak - Slalom
- Canoe/Kayak - Sprint
- Cycling
- Diving
- Golf
- Gymnastics - Artistic
- Gymnastics - Rhythmic
- Gymnastics - Trampoline
- Hockey
- Judo
- Rowing
- Rugby sevens
- Shooting
- Swimming
- Triathlon
- Weightlifting
- Wrestling

== Editions ==
The AOC has conducted six Australian Youth Olympic Festivals (in 2001, 2003, 2005, 2007, 2009 and 2013. for athletes from 13 to 19 years of age. Overall, $18.6 million has been in invested in staging the Festivals.

== See also ==
- Australian Masters Games
- Pan Pacific Masters Games
- Arafura Games
- Pacific Games
