= 2027 Men's FIH Hockey Junior World Cup =

14th edition of the Men's FIH Hockey Junior World Cup

Tournament details
- Host country: TBD
- Teams: 24 (from 5 confederations)

The 2027 Men's FIH Hockey Junior World Cup will be the 15th edition of the Men's FIH Hockey Junior World Cup, the biennial men's under-21 field hockey world championship organized by the International Hockey Federation. The tournament will feature 24 teams.

Germany are the defending champions who claimed their eighth title after defeating Spain through penalties in the 2025 Junior World Cup Final.

== Qualification ==
Under the qualification system, one place is reserved for the host nation, while 15 places are allocated to the top three teams from each of the five continental championships: Africa, Asia, Europe, Pan America and Oceania. The remaining eight places are allocated through continental quotas determined by the respective FIH Junior World Rankings as of 31 January 2026, with those places filled by the highest-placed teams not already qualified in the relevant continental championships.

As only Australia and New Zealand entered the 2026 Oceania qualifiers, their third allocated place will be allocated to the continent of the highest-placed team in the FIH Junior World Rankings not yet qualified through the FIH junior world ranking system.

Scotland returned to the tournament after 2001 by winning the 2026 EuroHockey U21 Championship II.

=== Qualified teams ===
Dates	Event	Location	Quotas	Qualifier(s)	Appearance(s)				Previous best performance
Dates	Event	Location	Quotas	Qualifier(s)	Total	First	Last	Streak	Previous best performance
	Hosts	—N/a	1						
6–18 April 2026	2026 Junior Pan American Cup	Santiago, Chile	3	Argentina	14	1979	2025	13	Champions (2005, 2021)
6–18 April 2026	2026 Junior Pan American Cup	Santiago, Chile	3	Canada	9	1982	2025	6	8th (1982)
6–18 April 2026	2026 Junior Pan American Cup	Santiago, Chile	3	Chile	9	1979	2025	4	12th (1979)
26 July – 1 August 2026	2026 EuroHockey U21 Championship	Valencia, Spain	7	Austria	3	2016	2025	2	12th (2016)
26 July – 1 August 2026	2026 EuroHockey U21 Championship	Valencia, Spain	7	Belgium	10	1985	2025	8	Runners-up (2016)
26 July – 1 August 2026	2026 EuroHockey U21 Championship	Valencia, Spain	7	England	11	1985	2025	2	4th (1997, 2001)
26 July – 1 August 2026	2026 EuroHockey U21 Championship	Valencia, Spain	7	France	8	1979	2025	4	Runners-up (2013, 2023)
26 July – 1 August 2026	2026 EuroHockey U21 Championship	Valencia, Spain	7	Germany	15	1979	2025	15	Champions (1982, 1985, 1989, 1993, 2009, 2013, 2023, 2025)
26 July – 1 August 2026	2026 EuroHockey U21 Championship	Valencia, Spain	7	Netherlands	15	1979	2025	15	Runners-up (1985, 2009)
26 July – 1 August 2026	2026 EuroHockey U21 Championship	Valencia, Spain	7	Spain	14	1979	2025	12	Runners-up (2025)
27 July – 1 August 2026	2026 EuroHockey U21 Championship II	Poznań, Poland	1	Ireland	4	1979	2025	2	8th (1989)
27 July – 1 August 2026	2026 EuroHockey U21 Championship II	Plzeň, Czechia	1	Scotland	3	1993	2001	1	10th (1993)
4–13 September 2026	2026 Junior Asia Cup	Moqi, China	6	China	2	2025	2025	2	20th (2025)
4–13 September 2026	2026 Junior Asia Cup	Moqi, China	6	India	13	1979	2025	10	Champions (2001, 2016)
4–13 September 2026	2026 Junior Asia Cup	Moqi, China	6	Japan	5	1997	2025	2	11th (1997)
4–13 September 2026	2026 Junior Asia Cup	Moqi, China	6	Malaysia	14	1979	2025	9	4th (1979, 1982, 2013)
4–13 September 2026	2026 Junior Asia Cup	Moqi, China	6	Pakistan	12	1979	2023	1	Champions (1979)
4–13 September 2026	2026 Junior Asia Cup	Moqi, China	6	South Korea	11	1989	2025	9	4th (1989)
1–4 October 2026	2026 Junior Oceania Cup	Redcliffe, Australia	2	Australia	13	1982	2025	3	Champions (1997)
1–4 October 2026	2026 Junior Oceania Cup	Redcliffe, Australia	2	New Zealand	8	1982	2025	3	4th (2009)
22–30 January 2027	2027 Junior Africa Cup	Nairobi, Kenya	3	TBD1					
22–30 January 2027	2027 Junior Africa Cup	Nairobi, Kenya	3	TBD2					
22–30 January 2027	2027 Junior Africa Cup	Nairobi, Kenya	3	TBD3					
Total			24						

== Squads ==
Players born on or after 1 January 2006 will be eligible to compete in the tournament. All players shall be at least 15 years of age by 1st January of 2027.
