= Men's FIH Hockey Junior World Cup =

- Upcoming season or competition: 2027 Men's FIH Hockey Junior World Cup
- Formerly: Men's Hockey Junior World Cup
- Sport: Field hockey
- Founded: 1979; 47 years ago
- First season: 1979
- No. of teams: 24
- Continent: International Hockey Federation
- Most recent champion: Germany (8th title) (2025)
- Most titles: Germany (8 titles)
- Qualification: Continental championships

The Men's FIH Hockey Junior World Cup, formerly known as the Hockey Junior World Cup, is an international field hockey competition organized by the International Hockey Federation. The tournament was started in 1979. Since 1985 it was held every four years. From 2021 onwards the tournament has been held every two years. Competitors must be under the age of 21 as of December 31 in the year before the tournament is held.

There is also a corresponding event for the women's junior teams. This competition started in 1989 and uses the same format as the men's event.

Five countries have dominated the event's history. Germany is the most successful team, having won the tournament eight times followed by Argentina and India, having won the tournament two times. Australia and Pakistan have each won the tournament once.

== History ==
The 2009 Junior World Cup was held jointly between Malaysia and Singapore, with Germany defeating the Netherlands 3–1 in the final. The 2013 tournament was held in India from 2 to 17 November 2013. Germany won the final for record 6th time defeating France 5–2. France claimed their first-ever medal in the tournament winning silver after losing to Germany. The 2016 edition was held between 8–18 December 2016 in Lucknow, India, with India defeating Belgium 2–1 in the final. India also became the first host nation to win the Junior World Cup. India are also the first and only nation to win any type of medal in junior world cup as a host. From 2025 onwards the tournament was expanded to 24 teams.

== Format ==
The Junior Hockey World Cup consists of a qualification stage and a final tournament stage. All the participating teams in the final tournament play in the qualification tournament.

=== Qualification ===
All the teams who wish to qualify for the final tournament play in the relevant continental junior championships. Each continental federation receives at least two finals places and the FIH determines which federations will receive additional places.

=== Final tournament ===
The final tournament features the continental champions and other qualified teams. In the tournament in 2009, the teams played a round robin phase, with the two top teams in each pool advancing to a medal-round and remaining teams playing for classification positions. The composition of the pools is determined using the current world rankings.

== Results ==
=== Summaries ===
#	Year	Host	Final			Third place match			Teams
#	Year	Host	Winner	Score	Runner-up	Third place	Score	Fourth place	Teams
1	1979; Details	Versailles, France	Pakistan	2–0	West Germany	Netherlands	2–1	Malaysia	12
2	1982; Details	Kuala Lumpur, Malaysia	West Germany	4–1	Australia	Pakistan	10–0	Malaysia	11
3	1985; Details	Vancouver, Canada	West Germany	4–1	Netherlands	Pakistan	4–2	Australia	14
4	1989; Details	Ipoh, Malaysia	West Germany	1–1 (a.e.t.) (4–2 p.s.)	Australia	Pakistan	6–2	South Korea	12
5	1993; Details	Terrassa, Spain	Germany	3–1	Pakistan	Australia	3–1	Netherlands	12
6	1997; Details	Milton Keynes, England	Australia	3–2	India	Germany	4–2	England	12
7	2001; Details	Hobart, Australia	India	6–1	Argentina	Germany	5–1	England	16
8	2005; Details	Rotterdam, Netherlands	Argentina	2–1	Australia	Spain	1–1 (a.e.t.) (6–5 p.s.)	India	16
9	2009; Details	Johor Bahru, Malaysia & Singapore	Germany	3–1	Netherlands	Australia	4–1	New Zealand	20
10	2013; Details	New Delhi, India	Germany	5–2	France	Netherlands	7–2	Malaysia	16
11	2016; Details	Lucknow, India	India	2–1	Belgium	Germany	3–0	Australia	16
12	2021; Details	Bhubaneswar, India	Argentina	4–2	Germany	France	3–1	India	16
13	2023; Details	Kuala Lumpur, Malaysia	Germany	2–1	France	Spain	3–1	India	16
14	2025; Details	Tamil Nadu, India	Germany	1–1 (3–2 p.s.)	Spain	India	4–2	Argentina	24
15	2027; Details								24

== Performance by nations ==
Team	Titles	Runners-up	Third places	Fourth places
Germany (Note: Includes results representing West Germany between 1979 and 1989)	8 (1982, 1985, 1989, 1993, 2009, 2013, 2023, 2025)	2 (1979, 2021)	3 (1997, 2001, 2016)	
India	2 (2001, 2016*)	1 (1997)	1 (2025*)	3 (2005, 2021*, 2023)
Argentina	2 (2005, 2021)	1 (2001)		1 (2025)
Australia	1 (1997)	3 (1982, 1989, 2005)	2 (1993, 2009)	2 (1985, 2016)
Pakistan	1 (1979)	1 (1993)	3 (1982, 1985, 1989)	
Netherlands		2 (1985, 2009)	2 (1979, 2013)	1 (1993)
France		2 (2013, 2023)	1 (2021)	
Spain		1 (2025)	2 (2005, 2023)	
Belgium		1 (2016)		
Malaysia				3 (1979, 1982*, 2013)
England				2 (1997*, 2001)
South Korea				1 (1989)
New Zealand				1 (2009)

* = host nation

=== Team appearances ===
Team	(France) 1979	(Malaysia) 1982	(Canada) 1985	(Malaysia) 1989	(Spain) 1993	(England) 1997	(Australia) 2001	(Netherlands) 2005	(Malaysia) (Singapore) 2009	(India) 2013	(India) 2016	(India) 2021	(Malaysia) 2023	(India) 2025	2027	Total
Argentina	6th	WD	7th	5th	6th	6th	2nd	1st	6th	11th	5th	1st	7th	4th	Q	14
Australia	–	2nd	4th	2nd	3rd	1st	6th	2nd	3rd	5th	4th	WD	6th	11th	Q	13
Austria	–	–	–	–	–	–	–	–	–	–	12th	–	–	18th	Q	3
Belgium	–	–	11th	–	–	12th	–	11th	11th	6th	2nd	6th	9th	5th	Q	10
Bangladesh	–	–	–	–	–	–	–	–	–	–	–	–	–	17th	–	1
Canada	–	8th	13th	–	–	–	16th	–	–	16th	16th	13th	16th	22nd	Q	9
Chile	12th	–	14th	–	–	–	15th	15th	17th	–	–	14th	15th	15th	Q	9
China	–	–	–	–	–	–	–	–	–	–	–	–	–	20th	Q	2
Cuba	–	–	–	–	8th	10th	–	–	–	–	–	–	–	–	–	2
Egypt	–	–	12th	10th	12th	9th	–	12th	14th	15th	15th	16th	14th	21st		11
England	–	–	6th	7th	5th	4th	4th	9th	16th	14th	8th	WD	–	9th	Q	11
France	7th	–	8th	–	–	–	10th	–	–	2nd	–	3rd	2nd	7th	Q	8
Germany	2nd	1st	1st	1st	1st	3rd	3rd	6th	1st	1st	3rd	2nd	1st	1st	Q	15
Ghana	10th	–	–	–	–	–	–	–	–	–	–	–	–	–		1
India	5th	5th	5th	–	–	2nd	1st	4th	9th	10th	1st	4th	4th	3rd	Q	13
Ireland	8th	–	–	–	–	–	14th	–	–	–	–	–	–	10th	Q	4
Japan	–	–	–	–	–	11th	–	–	13th	–	13th	–	–	14th	Q	5
Kenya	–	9th	–	–	–	–	–	–	–	–	–	–	–	–		1
Malaysia	4th	4th	10th	6th	11th	–	12th	10th	12th	4th	11th	8th	12th	13th	Q	14
Mexico	–	–	–	–	–	–	–	16th	–	–	–	–	–	–	–	1
Namibia	–	–	–	–	–	–	–	–	–	–	–	–	–	23rd		1
Netherlands	3rd	6th	2nd	9th	4th	7th	8th	5th	2nd	3rd	7th	5th	5th	6th	Q	15
New Zealand	–	10th	–	–	–	–	9th	–	4th	7th	9th	WD	11th	8th	Q	8
Oman	–	–	–	–	–	–	–	–	–	–	–	–	–	24th	–	1
Pakistan	1st	3rd	3rd	3rd	2nd	5th	–	7th	5th	9th	–	11th	8th	WD	Q	12
Poland	–	–	–	–	–	–	–	14th	10th	–	–	12th	–	–	–	3
Russia	Part of the Soviet Union				–	–	–	–	18th	–	–	–	–	–	–	1
Scotland	–	–	–	–	10th	–	13th	–	–	–	–	–	–	–	Q	3
Singapore	11th	11th	–	–	–	–	–	–	19th	–	–	–	–	–	–	3
South Africa	–	–	–	–	–	–	11th	13th	15th	12th	10th	9th	10th	12th		8
South Korea	–	–	–	4th	9th	–	7th	8th	7th	8th	14th	10th	13th	19th	Q	11
Soviet Union	–	–	–	12th	Defunct											1
Spain	9th	7th	–	8th	7th	8th	5th	3rd	8th	13th	6th	7th	3rd	2nd	Q	14
Switzerland	–	–	–	–	–	–	–	–	–	–	–	–	–	16th	–	1
United States	–	–	–	11th	–	–	–	–	20th	–	–	15th	–	–	–	3
Zimbabwe	–	–	9th	–	–	–	–	–	–	–	–	–	–	–		1
Total (36)	12	11	14	12	12	12	16	16	20	16	16	16	16	24	24	

=== Debut of teams ===
Year	Debuting teams			Successor and renamed teams
Year	Teams	No.	CT	Successor and renamed teams
1979	Argentina, Chile, France, Ghana, India, Ireland, Malaysia,Netherlands, Pakistan, Singapore, Spain, West Germany	12	12	
1982	Australia, Canada, Kenya, New Zealand	4	16	
1985	Belgium, Egypt, England, Zimbabwe	4	20	
1989	South Korea, Soviet Union, United States	3	23	
1993	Cuba, Scotland	2	25	Germany
1997	Japan	1	26	
2001	South Africa	1	27	
2005	Mexico, Poland	2	29	
2009	Russia	0	30	
2013		0	30	
2016	Austria	1	31	
2021		0	31	
2023		0	31	
2025	Bangladesh, China, Namibia, Oman, Switzerland	5	36	

== See also ==
- Field hockey at the Summer Olympics
- Men's FIH Hockey World Cup
- Men's FIH Indoor Hockey World Cup
- Women's FIH Indoor Hockey World Cup
- Women's FIH Hockey World Cup
- Women's FIH Hockey Junior World Cup
- FIH Para Hockey World Cup
