= Germany men's national under-21 field hockey team =

Germany
- Association: German Hockey Federation (Deutscher Hockey-Bund)
- Confederation: EHF (Europe)
- Head Coach: Rein van Eijk
- Assistant coach(es): Russell Garcia; Tobias Jordan; OMAR SCHLINGEMANN
- Manager: Tobias Feuerhake
- Captain: Matteo Poljaric
Home	Away

Junior World Cup
- Appearances: 14 (first in 1979)
- Best result: (gold) 1st (1982, 1985, 1989, 1993, 2009, 2013, 2023, 2025)

EuroHockey Junior Championship
- Appearances: 22 (first in 1976)
- Best result: (gold) 1st (1977, 1981, 1984, 1988, 1998, 2019)
Medal record
Junior World Cup
Gold medal – first place	1982 Kuala Lumpur
Gold medal – first place	1985 Vancouver
Gold medal – first place	1989 Ipoh
Gold medal – first place	1993 Terrassa
Gold medal – first place	2009 Johor Bahru–Singapore
Gold medal – first place	2013 New Delhi
Gold medal – first place	2023 Kuala Lumpur
Gold medal – first place	2025 Tamil Nadu
Silver medal – second place	1979 Versailles
Silver medal – second place	2021 Bhubaneswar
Bronze medal – third place	1997 Milton Keynes
Bronze medal – third place	2001 Hobart
Bronze medal – third place	2016 Lucknow
EuroHockey Junior Championship
Gold medal – first place	1977 Folkestone
Gold medal – first place	1981 Barcelona
Gold medal – first place	1984 Rome
Gold medal – first place	1988 Santander
Gold medal – first place	1998 Poznań
Gold medal – first place	2019 Valencia
Silver medal – second place	1996 Vejle
Silver medal – second place	2000 Madrid
Silver medal – second place	2002 Lausanna
Silver medal – second place	2004 Nivelles
Silver medal – second place	2006 Prague
Silver medal – second place	2014 Waterloo
Silver medal – second place	2022 Ghent
Silver medal – second place	2026 Valencia
Bronze medal – third place	1976 Hamburg
Bronze medal – third place	1978 Dublin
Bronze medal – third place	1992 Vught
Bronze medal – third place	2008 San Sebastián
Bronze medal – third place	2010 Siemianowice Śląski
Bronze medal – third place	2012 's-Hertogenbosch
Bronze medal – third place	2017 Valencia

The Germany men's national under-21 field hockey team represents Germany in men's international under-21 field hockey competitions and is controlled by the German Hockey Federation, the governing body for field hockey in Germany.

The team competes in the EuroHockey Junior Championships which they have won six times. They have qualified for all Junior World Cups which they have won a record eight times.

== Tournament record ==
=== Junior World Cup ===
- 1979 – (silver)
- 1982 – (gold)
- 1985 – (gold)
- 1989 – (gold)
- 1993 – (gold)
- 1997 – (bronze)
- 2001 – (bronze)
- 2005 – 6th place
- 2009 – (gold)
- 2013 – (gold)
- 2016 – (bronze)
- 2021 – (silver)
- 2023 – (gold)
- 2025 – (gold)
- 2027 – Qualified

=== EuroHockey Junior Championship ===
- 1976 – (bronze)
- 1977 – (gold)
- 1978 – (bronze)
- 1981 – (gold)
- 1984 – (gold)
- 1988 – (gold)
- 1992 – (bronze)
- 1996 – (silver)
- 1998 – (gold)
- 2000 – (silver)
- 2002 – (silver)
- 2004 – (silver)
- 2006 – (silver)
- 2008 – (bronze)
- 2010 – (bronze)
- 2012 – (bronze)
- 2014 – (silver)
- 2017 – (bronze)
- 2019 – (gold)
- 2022 – (silver)
- 2024 – 4th place
- 2026 – (silver)

=== Sultan of Johor Cup ===
- 2012 – (gold)
- 2023 – (gold)

== Players ==
=== Current squad ===
The following players were selected for the FIA Junior World Cup held at Tamil Nadu, India from 1 to 10 December 2025: Paul Babic, Julijan Cerkez, Jasper Ditzer, Jannik Enaux, Christian Franz, Benedikt Geyer, Paul Glander, Nicolaus Hansen, Ben Hasbach, Lenn Hoffmann, Lukas Kossel, Quirin Nahr, Maximilian Stahmann, Ferdinand Steinebach, Niklas Tecklenburg, Jonas von Gersum, Alec von Schwerin, Justus Warweg, Johann Wehnert and Titus Wex.

Earlier on 14 July 2022, the following 18 players were named for the 2022 Men's EuroHockey Junior Championship in Ghent, Belgium from 24 to 30 July 2022.

Caps updated as of 30 July 2022, after the match against the Netherlands.

No.	Pos.	Player	Date of birth (age)	Caps	Club
1	GK	Jean Danneberg	8 November 2002 (age 23)	7	(Germany) TEC Darmstadt
29	GK	Joshua Onyekwue	2 November 2002 (age 24)	1	(Germany) Rot-Weiss Köln
5	DF	Moritz Himmler	2 March 2002 (age 24)	5	(Germany) Mannheimer HC
8	DF	Benedikt Schwarzhaupt (Captain)	14 January 2001 (age 25)	17	(Germany) UHC Hamburg
12	DF	Moritz Ludwig	14 September 2001 (age 25)	21	(Germany) Uhlenhorst Mülheim
15	DF	Nikas Berendts	11 July 2002 (age 24)	4	(Germany) Münchner SC
16	DF	Antheus Barry	6 October 2002 (age 24)	15	(Germany) Rot-Weiss Köln
19	DF	Luca Wolff	23 November 2001 (age 24)	5	(Netherlands) Pinoké
21	DF	Phillip Holzmüller	13 August 2001 (age 25)	11	(Germany) Münchner SC
9	MF	Erik Kleinlein	3 December 2001 (age 24)	14	(Germany) Mannheimer HC
11	MF	Hugo von Montgelas	17 April 2004 (age 22)	5	(Germany) Frankfurt 1880
13	MF	Luis Höchemer	13 June 2002 (age 24)	5	(Germany) Rot-Weiss Köln
14	MF	Matteo Poljaric	11 February 2002 (age 24)	11	(Germany) Berliner HC
23	MF	Mario Schachner	19 September 2001 (age 25)	21	(Germany) Mannheimer HC
7	FW	Fabio Seitz	31 August 2003 (age 23)	5	(Germany) Rot-Weiss Köln
24	FW	Liam Holdermann	24 March 2003 (age 23)	5	(Germany) Berliner HC
26	FW	Elian Mazkour	9 March 2001 (age 25)	5	(Germany) Rot-Weiss Köln
27	FW	Florian Sperling	24 August 2002 (age 24)	5	(Germany) Berliner HC

=== Recent call-ups ===
The following players have also been called up to the squad within twelve months before July 2022.

Pos.	Player	Date of birth (age)	Caps	Club	Latest call-up
GK	Anton Brinckman	2 April 2000 (age 26)	12	(Germany) Harvestehuder THC	2021 Junior World Cup
DF	Christopher Kutter	22 January 2000 (age 26)	6	(Germany) UHC Hamburg	2021 Junior World Cup
MF	Aton Flatten	19 August 2002 (age 24)	15	(Germany) Münchner SC	2021 Junior World Cup
MF	Niclas Schippan	1 January 2000 (age 26)	10	(Germany) Harvestehuder THC	2021 Junior World Cup
MF	Maximilian Siegburg	1 May 2000 (age 26)	7	(Germany) Rot-Weiss Köln	2021 Junior World Cup
MF	Robert Duckscheer	7 July 2000 (age 26)	6	(Germany) Uhlenhorst Mülheim	2021 Junior World Cup
MF	Michel Struthoff	19 April 2003 (age 23)	6	(Germany) UHC Hamburg	2021 Junior World Cup
FW	Hannes Müller	18 May 2000 (age 26)	23	(Germany) UHC Hamburg	2021 Junior World Cup
FW	Masi Pfandt	8 May 2000 (age 26)	6	(Germany) Harvestehuder THC	2021 Junior World Cup
FW	Paul Smith	21 January 2000 (age 26)	6	(Germany) Hamburger Polo Club	2021 Junior World Cup
FW	Julius Hayner	29 April 2000 (age 26)	2	(Germany) Düsseldorfer HC	2021 Junior World Cup

== See also ==
- Germany men's national field hockey team
- Germany women's national under-21 field hockey team
