= Belgium men's national under-21 field hockey team =

Belgium
- Nickname(s): Young Red Lions
- Association: Royal Belgian Hockey Association
- Confederation: EHF (Europe)
- Head Coach: Jeroen Baart
- Assistant coach(es): Javier Telechea
- Manager: David Prinsen Geerligs
- Captain: Jeremy Wilbers
Home	Away

Junior World Cup
- Appearances: 9 (first in 1985)
- Best result: (silver) 2nd (2016)

EuroHockey Junior Championship
- Appearances: 18 (first in 1976)
- Best result: (gold) 1st (2012)
Medal record
Junior World Cup
Silver medal – second place	2016 Lucknow
EuroHockey Junior Championship
Gold medal – first place	2012 's-Hertogenbosch
Silver medal – second place	1981 Barcelona
Silver medal – second place	2010 Siemianowice Śląskie
Silver medal – second place	2017 Valencia
Bronze medal – third place	2006 Prague
Bronze medal – third place	2022 Ghent
Bronze medal – third place	2024 Terrassa

The Belgium men's national under-21 field hockey team represents Belgium in men's international under-21 field hockey and is controlled by the Royal Belgian Hockey Association, the governing body for field hockey in Belgium.

The team plays in the Men's EuroHockey Junior Championships and has qualified eight times for the Men's FIH Hockey Junior World Cup. Their biggest successes were winning the EuroHockey Junior Championship in 2012 and being runners-up at the 2016 Junior World Cup.

== Tournament record ==
=== Junior World Cup ===
- 1985 – 11th place
- 1997 – 12th place
- 2005 – 11th place
- 2009 – 11th place
- 2013 – 6th place
- 2016 – (silver)
- 2021 – 6th place
- 2023 – 9th place
- 2025 – 5th place
- 2027 – Qualified

=== EuroHockey Junior Championship ===
- 1976 – 5th place
- 1978 – 6th place
- 1981 – (silver)
- 1984 – 4th place
- 1996 – 5th place
- 1998 – 6th place
- 2002 – 6th place
- 2004 – 5th place
- 2006 – (bronze)
- 2008 – 4th place
- 2010 – (silver)
- 2012 – (gold)
- 2014 – 4th place
- 2017 – (silver)
- 2019 – 5th place
- 2022 – (bronze)
- 2024 – (bronze)
- 2026 – 4th place

=== EuroHockey Junior Championship II ===
- 2000 – (gold)

== Players ==
=== Current squad ===
The following 18 players were named on 26 October 2023 for the 2023 Men's FIH Hockey Junior World Cup in Kuala Lumpur, Malaysia from 5 to 16 December 2023.

Head coach: Jeroen Baart

Caps updated as of 30 July 2022, after the match against Spain.

No.	Pos.	Player	Date of birth (age)	Caps	Club
4	MF	Lucas Putters	25 January 2002 (age 24)	10	(Belgium) Dragons
5	DF	Hugo Labouchere	7 February 2004 (age 22)	0	(Belgium) Orée
6	FW	Diego Hainaut	19 November 2004 (age 21)	0	(Belgium) Uccle Sport
7	MF	Victor Foubert	12 October 2002 (age 23)	5	(Belgium) Dragons
8	MF	Nicolas Bogaerts	15 January 2004 (age 22)	0	(Belgium) Orée
9	MF	Louis De Backer	27 February 2002 (age 24)	5	(Belgium) Léopold
10	MF	Maximilian Langer	5 August 2006 (age 20)	0	(Belgium) Orée
11	FW	Jack Vloeberghs	15 October 2003 (age 22)	0	(Belgium) Herakles
12	FW	Max Luyten	5 November 2002 (age 23)	5	(Belgium) Dragons
13	FW	Louis Depelsenaire	13 September 2002 (age 24)	5	(Belgium) Waterloo Ducks
14	FW	Thomas Crols	11 September 2002 (age 24)	5	(Belgium) Dragons
17	MF	Guillermo Hainaut	8 June 2002 (age 24)	11	(Belgium) Uccle Sport
21	GK	Julien Le Maire	30 July 2002 (age 24)	0	(Belgium) Herakles
23	DF	Lucas Balthazar	8 January 2006 (age 20)	0	(Belgium) Uccle Sport
24	DF	Thomas Joye	24 February 2003 (age 23)	5	(Belgium) Uccle Sport
26	MF	Charles Langendries	26 April 2006 (age 20)	0	(Belgium) Waterloo Ducks
30	DF	Brieuc Petit	5 October 2003 (age 23)	0	(Belgium) Waterloo Ducks
43	GK	Boris Feldheim	1 April 2002 (age 24)	11	(Belgium) Daring

== See also ==
- Belgium men's national field hockey team
- Belgium women's national under-21 field hockey team
