= 2010 Men's EuroHockey Junior Championship =

Hockey tournament

2019 Men's EuroHockey Junior Championship
Tournament details
- Host country: Poland
- City: Siemianowice Śląskie
- Dates: 25–31 July
- Teams: 8 (from 1 confederation)

Final positions
- Champions: Netherlands (7th title)
- Runner-up: Belgium
- Third place: Germany

Tournament statistics
- Matches played: 20
- Goals scored: 109 (5.45 per match)
- Top scorer: (Belgium) Tom Boon (9 goals)

The 2010 Men's EuroHockey Junior Championship was the 15th edition of the men's EuroHockey Junior Championship, the biennial international men's under-21 field hockey championship of Europe organised by the European Hockey Federation. It was held in Siemianowice Śląskie, Poland from 25 to 31 July 2010.

The Netherlands won the tournament for the seventh time after defeating the Belgium 4–1 in the final. Germany won the bronze model by defeating England 4–3.

== Qualified teams ==
The following eight team qualified based on their final positions in the 2008 EuroHockey Junior Championships.

Dates	Event	Location	Quotas	Qualifiers
20–26 July 2018	2008 EuroHockey Junior Championship	San Sebastián, Spain	6	Belgium; England; Germany; Netherlands; Poland; Spain
20–26 July 2018	2010 EuroHockey Junior Championship II	Bra, Italy	2	France; Russia
Total			8	

== Results ==
=== Preliminary round ===
==== Pool A ====
Pos	Team	Pld	W	D	L	GF	GA	GD	Pts	Qualification
1	Belgium	3	2	1	0	11	8	+3	7	Semi-finals
2	England	3	2	0	1	10	7	+3	6	Semi-finals
3	Spain	3	0	2	1	4	8	−4	2	Pool C
4	France	3	0	1	2	5	7	−2	1	Pool C

Source: SiemianowiceŚląskie2010
Rules for classification: 1) points; 2) goal difference; 3) goals scored; 4) head-to-head result.

25 July 2010
10:30

Spain	1–5	England
Romeu 38'	Report	Faulkner 5'; Hearne 8'; Griffiths 25'; Kinder 32'; Beckett 35'

Umpires:
Michael Gerwig (GER)
Coen van Bunge (NED)

25 July 2010
12:45

Belgium	4–3	France
Boon 16', 60', 63'; Adriaensen 18'	Report	Sánchez 6'; Genestet 29'; Magner 50'

Umpires:
Chris McConkey (IRE)
Grzegorz Rysiński (POL)

26 July 2010
15:45

England	3–2	France
Beckett 28', 42'; Griffiths 47'	Report	Magner 4'; Lo. Sevestre 21'

Umpires:
Mikhail Golovanov (RUS)
Coen van Bunge (NED)

26 July 2010
18:00

Belgium	3–3	Spain
Boon 13', 43', 60'	Report	Bach 48'; Moreno 66'; Elías 690'

Umpires:
Martin Madden (SCO)
Grzegorz Rysiński (POL)

28 July 2010
10:30

Spain	0–0	France
	Report

Umpires:
Michael Gerwig (GER)
Coen van Bunge (NED)

28 July 2010
12:45

England	2–4	Belgium
Faulkner 28'; Beckett 52'	Report	Gougnard 29'; Van Aubel 42', 44'; Boon 47'

Umpires:
Martin Madden (SCO)
Mikhail Golovanov (RUS)

==== Pool B ====
Pos	Team	Pld	W	D	L	GF	GA	GD	Pts	Qualification
1	Netherlands	3	3	0	0	8	5	+3	9	Semi-finals
2	Germany	3	2	0	1	16	9	+7	6	Semi-finals
3	Russia	3	0	1	2	9	13	−4	1	Pool C
4	Poland	3	0	1	2	4	10	−6	1	Pool C

Source: SiemianowiceŚląskie2010
Rules for classification: 1) points; 2) goal difference; 3) goals scored; 4) head-to-head result.

25 July 2010
15:45

Germany	8–5	Russia
Swiatek 7', 16', 52'; Matania 38', 41', 43'; Hablawetz 49'; Polk 57'	Report	Komarov 10', 61', 69'; Yankun 29'; Zamalutdinov 32'

Umpires:
Pierric Jourdain (FRA)
Sébastien Dutermé (BEL)

25 July 2010
18:30

Netherlands	2–1	Poland
Buissant 22'; Siebinga 41'	Report	Oszyjczyk 70'

Umpires:
Luís Mariano Martínez (ESP)
Paul Walker (ENG)

27 July 2010
15:45

Germany	3–4	Netherlands
Grell 21', 38'; Swiatek 56'	Report	Van Puffelen 12'; Kellerman 29'; Van Ass 52'; Galema 65'

Umpires:
Chris McConkey (IRE)
Pierric Jourdain (FRA)

27 July 2010
18:00

Poland	3–3	Russia
Makowski 20', 56', 57'	Report	Yankun 35'; Komarov 40', 68'

Umpires:
Sébastien Dutermé (BEL)
Luís Mariano Martínez (ESP)

28 July 2010
15:45

Netherlands	2–1	Russia
Buissant 19'; Benschop 67'	Report	Skiperskiy 55'

Umpires:
Chris McConkey (IRE)
Luís Mariano Martínez (ESP)

27 July 2010
18:00

Poland	0–5	Germany
	Report	Miltkau 18', 53'; Nieder 21'; Matania 44'; Polk 56'

Umpires:
Sébastien Dutermé (BEL)
Paul Walker (ENG)

=== Classification round ===
==== Fifth to eighth place classification ====
Points obtained in the preliminary round are carried over into Pool C.

===== Pool C =====
Pos	Team	Pld	W	D	L	GF	GA	GD	Pts	Relegation
1	France	3	1	2	0	7	4	+3	5	
2	Spain	3	1	2	0	7	6	+1	5	
3	Russia	3	0	3	0	9	9	0	3	Relegated to 2012 EuroHockey Junior Championship II
4	Poland	3	0	1	2	7	11	−4	1	Relegated to 2012 EuroHockey Junior Championship II

Source: SiemianowiceŚląskie2010
Rules for classification: 1) points; 2) goal difference; 3) goals scored; 4) head-to-head result.

30 July 2010
10:00

France	3–3	Russia
Magner 15', 55'; Genestet 44'	Report	Yankun 44', 46'; Komarov 64'

Umpires:
Paul Walker (ENG)
Grzegorz Rysiński (POL)

30 July 2010
12:15

Spain	4–3	Poland
Lasso 10', 46'; Piera 32'; Pujal 61'	Report	Makowski 3'; Wachowiak 12'; Nowakowski 70'

Umpires:
Pierric Jourdain (FRA)
Mikhail Golovanov (RUS)

31 July 2010
10:00

France	4–1	Poland
Sánchez 1', 8', 63'; Van Straaten 68'	Report	Poltaszewski 48'

Umpires:
Coen van Bunge (NED)
Sébastien Dutermé (BEL)

31 July 2010
12:15

Spain	3–3	Russia
Romeu 6', 57', 64'	Report	Komarov 10'; Yankun 34'; Kornilov 40'

Umpires:
Michael Gerwig (GER)
Paul Walker (ENG)

==== First to fourth place classification ====
Semi-finals
30 July 2010
Belgium (p.s.o)	1 (5)
Germany	1 (4)
30 July 2010
Netherlands	3
England	1

Final
31 July 2010
Belgium	1
Netherlands	4
Third Place
31 July 2010
Germany	4
England	3

===== Semi-finals =====
30 July 2010
15:00

Netherlands	3–1	England
Buissant 29'; Siebinga 31'; Möhlmann 52'	Report	Beckett 56'

Umpires:
Martin Madden (SCO)
Michael Gerwig (GER)

30 July 2010
15:00

Belgium	1–1	Germany
Boon 60'	1 2	Meyer 51'
Penalties
Denayer (penalty shoot-out scored); Luypaert (penalty shoot-out scored); Boccard (penalty shoot-out scored); Gougnard (penalty shoot-out scored); Boon (penalty shoot-out scored)	5–4	(penalty shoot-out scored) Matania; (penalty shoot-out scored) Grell; (penalty shoot-out scored) Nevado; (penalty shoot-out scored) Miltkau; (penalty shoot-out missed) Hablawetz

Umpires:
Coen van Bunge (NED)
Luís Mariano Martínez (ESP)

===== Third and fourth place =====
31 July 2010
15:30

Germany	4–3	England
Matania 22', 25'; Miltkau 38'; Nevado 39'	Report	Beckett 28', 40'; Jackson 44'

Umpires:
Luís Mariano Martínez (ESP)
Pierric Jourdain (FRA)

===== Final =====
31 July 2010
18:00

Belgium	1–4	Netherlands
Boon 44'	Report	Bovendeert 23'; Galema 27'; Buissant 65'; Kellerman 68'

Umpires:
Martin Madden (SCO)
Chris McConkey (IRE)

== Statistics ==
=== Final standings ===
As per statistical convention in field hockey, matches decided in extra time are counted as wins and losses, while matches decided by penalty shoot-outs are counted as draws.

Pos	Team	Pld	W	D	L	GF	GA	GD	Pts	Qualification
1st place, gold medalist(s)	Netherlands	5	5	0	0	15	7	+8	15	Tournament Champion
2nd place, silver medalist(s)	Belgium	5	2	2	1	13	13	0	8	
3rd place, bronze medalist(s)	Germany	5	3	1	1	21	13	+8	10	
4	England	5	2	0	3	14	14	0	6	
5	France	5	1	2	2	12	11	+1	5	
6	Spain	5	1	3	1	11	14	−3	6	
7	Russia	5	0	3	2	15	19	−4	3	Relegated to 2012 EuroHockey Junior Championship II
8	Poland (H)	5	0	1	4	8	18	−10	1	Relegated to 2012 EuroHockey Junior Championship II

Source: EuroHockey
(H) Hosts

=== Goalscorers ===
There were 109 goals scored in 20 matches, for an average of 5.45 goals per match.

9 goals

- (Belgium) Tom Boon

7 goals

- (England) David Beckett
- (Russia) Nikolay Komarov

6 goals

- (Germany) Tobias Matania

5 goals

- (Russia) Nikolay Yankun

4 goals

- (France) Fabien Magner
- (France) Oliver Sánchez
- (Germany) Jonas Swiatek
- (Netherlands) Jan Buissant
- (Poland) Krystian Makowski
- (Spain) Josep Romeu

3 goals

- (Germany) Marco Miltkau

2 goals

- (Belgium) Florent van Aubel
- (England) Simon Faulkner
- (England) Christopher Griffiths
- (France) Hugo Genestet
- (Germany) Niklas Grell
- (Germany) Moritz Polk
- (Netherlands) Jelle Galema
- (Netherlands) Bjorn Kellerman
- (Netherlands) Lukas Siebinga
- (Spain) Gonzalo Lasso

1 goal

- (Belgium) Christophe Adriaensen
- (Belgium) Simon Gougnard
- (England) William Hearne
- (England) Peter Jackson
- (England) Jonathan Kinder
- (France) Lois Sevestre
- (France) Niels van Straaten
- (Germany) Patrick Hablawetz
- (Germany) Félix Meyer
- (Germany) Ricardo Nevado
- (Germany) Nicolai Nieder
- (Netherlands) Seve van Ass
- (Netherlands) Floris Benschop
- (Netherlands) Roel Bovandeert
- (Netherlands) Dick Möhlmann
- (Netherlands) Diede van Puffelen
- (Poland) Michał Nowakowski
- (Poland) Szymon Oszyjczyk
- (Poland) Michał Poltaszewski
- (Poland) Tomasz Wachowiak
- (Russia) Anton Kornilov
- (Russia) Alexander Skiperskiy
- (Russia) Iflat Zamalutdinov
- (Spain) Oriol Bach
- (Spain) Joan Elías
- (Spain) Alfonso Moreno
- (Spain) Salvador Piera
- (Spain) Marc Pujal
