= 2001 Men's Hockey Junior World Cup =

7th edition of the Men's Hockey Junior World Cup

Junior World Cup 2001 Hobart Men

Tournament details
- Host country: Australia
- City: Hobart
- Dates: 9 October 2001 – 21 October 2001
- Teams: 16
- Venue: Tasmanian Hockey Centre

Final positions
- Champions: India (1st title)
- Runner-up: Argentina
- Third place: Germany

Tournament statistics
- Matches played: 64
- Goals scored: 282 (4.41 per match)
- Top scorer: (India) Deepak Thakur (10 goals)
- Best player: (Ireland) David Eakins
- Best goalkeeper: (India) Devesh Chauhan

The 2001 Men's Hockey Junior World Cup was the seventh edition of the Hockey Junior World Cup. It was held from 9–21 October October 2001 in Hobart, Australia.

India won the tournament for the first time by defeating Argentina 6–1 in the final. Germany won the bronze medal by defeating England 5–1 in the third and fourth place playoff.

== Qualification ==
Each continental federation received a number of quotas depending on the FIH World Rankings for teams qualified through their junior continental championships. Alongside the host nation, 16 teams competed in the tournament.

- Argentina
- Australia (defending champions)
- Canada
- Chile
- England
- France
- Germany
- India
- Ireland
- Malaysia
- Netherlands
- New Zealand
- South Africa
- South Korea
- Scotland
- Spain

== Results ==
All times are local time (UTC+10:00)

=== Preliminary round ===
==== Pool A ====
Pos	Team	Pld	W	D	L	GF	GA	GD	Pts	Qualification
1	England	3	2	1	0	6	2	+4	7	Medal round
2	Australia	3	1	2	0	8	2	+6	5	Medal round
3	Ireland	3	1	1	1	5	3	+2	4	
4	Chile	3	0	0	3	4	16	−12	0	

Rules for classification: 1) points; 2) goal difference; 3) goals scored; 4) head-to-head result.

9 October 2001
10:00

England	5–2	Chile
Clarke 2'; Jones 2', 37'; Mantell 49'; Webber 61'	Report	Thiermann 10'; Stein 67'

Stadium:
Tasmanian Hockey Centre

9 October 2001
13:00

Australia	1–1	Ireland
Eglington 12'	Report	Hobbs 46'

Stadium:
Tasmanian Hockey Centre

10 October 2001
17:30

Chile	1–7	Australia
Kuhlenthal 53'	Report	Victory 7', 11'; Bullion 13', 22'; Eglington 21'; Marshall 40'; Hammond 69'

Stadium:
Tasmanian Hockey Centre

10 October 2001
19:30

Ireland	0–1	England
	Report	Jones 65'

Stadium:
Tasmanian Hockey Centre

12 October 2001
17:30

Chile	1–4	Ireland
Krainz 31'	Report	Eakins 4', 47', 59', 61'

Stadium:
Tasmanian Hockey Centre

12 October 2001
19:30

England	0–0	Australia
	Report

Stadium:
Tasmanian Hockey Centre

==== Pool B ====
Pos	Team	Pld	W	D	L	GF	GA	GD	Pts	Qualification
1	Netherlands	3	2	1	0	7	2	+5	7	Medal round
2	South Korea	3	1	2	0	7	6	+1	5	Medal round
3	South Africa	3	1	0	2	6	9	−3	3	
4	France	3	0	1	2	3	6	−3	1	

Rules for classification: 1) points; 2) goal difference; 3) goals scored; 4) head-to-head result.

10 October 2001
13:00

South Korea	2–2	Netherlands
Cha Jong-Bok 62'; Seo Jong-Ho 70'	Report	Neumeier 29' van Weerd 52'

Stadium:
Tasmanian Hockey Centre

10 October 2001
15:30

South Africa	3–2	France
Ravenscroft 20'; Basson 62'; Haley 70'	Report	Verrier 21'; Bouthors 47'

Stadium:
Tasmanian Hockey Centre

11 October 2001
17:30

South Korea	1–1	France
Yoon Sung-Hoon 61'	Report	Gouedard-Comte 49'

Stadium:
Tasmanian Hockey Centre

11 October 2001
19:30

South Africa	0–3	Netherlands
	Report	van Weerd 26'; Koops 34'; Weusthof 39'

Stadium:
Tasmanian Hockey Centre

13 October 2001
09:00

South Korea	4–3	South Africa
Seo Jong-Ho 4', 33'; Kang 50'; Oh Dae-Keun 54'	Report	Haley 19'; Isaac 52'; Rose-Innes 66'

Stadium:
Tasmanian Hockey Centre

13 October 2001
11:00

Netherlands	2–0	France
Weusthof 43', 45'	Report

Stadium:
Tasmanian Hockey Centre

==== Pool C ====
Pos	Team	Pld	W	D	L	GF	GA	GD	Pts	Qualification
1	India	3	3	0	0	15	1	+14	9	Medal round
2	Spain	3	2	0	1	14	4	+10	6	Medal round
3	Scotland	3	1	0	2	4	16	−12	3	
4	Canada	3	0	0	3	2	14	−12	0	

Rules for classification: 1) points; 2) goal difference; 3) goals scored; 4) head-to-head result.

9 October 2001
17:30

India	5–0	Canada
Thakur 12'; Prabhjot 12', 25'; Jugraj 42', 55'	Report

Stadium:
Tasmanian Hockey Centre

9 October 2001
19:30

Scotland	0–8	Spain
	Report	Quemada 7', 51', 67'; Tubau 14', 32'; Freixa 26', 40', 50'

Stadium:
Tasmanian Hockey Centre

11 October 2001
09:00

Spain	6–1	Canada
Sala 20', 40'; Tubau 23', 39'; Quemada 33'; Freixa 63'	Report	Sowerby 12'

Stadium:
Tasmanian Hockey Centre

11 October 2001
11:00

India	7–1	Scotland
Prabhjot 10'; Thakur 23', 51', 58', 68'; Tejbir 28'; Kanwalpreet 40'	Report	Stott 29'

Stadium:
Tasmanian Hockey Centre

12 October 2001
11:00

Scotland	3–1	Canada
Christie 18'; Doherty 54'; Stott 55'	Report	Basi 47'

Stadium:
Tasmanian Hockey Centre

12 October 2001
13:00

Spain	0–3	India
	Report	Jugraj 6'; Thakur 39'; Gagan 47'

Stadium:
Tasmanian Hockey Centre

==== Pool D ====
Pos	Team	Pld	W	D	L	GF	GA	GD	Pts	Qualification
1	Germany	3	3	0	0	6	3	+3	9	Medal round
2	Argentina	3	2	0	1	9	2	+7	6	Medal round
3	New Zealand	3	1	0	2	4	7	−3	3	
4	Malaysia	3	0	0	3	3	10	−7	0	

Rules for classification: 1) points; 2) goal difference; 3) goals scored; 4) head-to-head result.

10 October 2001
09:00

Germany	2–1	Argentina
Witthaus 22', 34'	Report	Garreta 48'

Stadium:
Tasmanian Hockey Centre

10 October 2001
11:00

New Zealand	3–2	Malaysia
Burrows 11', 53'; Hopping 25'	Report	Jiwa 15', 18'

Stadium:
Tasmanian Hockey Centre

11 October 2001
13:00

Germany	2–1	New Zealand
Duckwitz 19'; Weß 65'	Report	Stephenson 43'

Stadium:
Tasmanian Hockey Centre

11 October 2001
15:00

Argentina	5–0	Malaysia
Cammareri 2' del Negro 15', 58'; Vila 26'; Garreta 37'	Report

Stadium:
Tasmanian Hockey Centre

13 October 2001
13:00

Malaysia	1–2	Germany
Jivan 62'	Report	Landshut 11'; Keller 42'

Stadium:
Tasmanian Hockey Centre

13 October 2001
15:00

New Zealand	0–3	Argentina
	Report	Cammareri 11'; Gilardi 36', 48'

Stadium:
Tasmanian Hockey Centre

=== Medal round ===
==== Pool E ====
Pos	Team	Pld	W	D	L	GF	GA	GD	Pts	Qualification
1	Germany	3	3	0	0	12	6	+6	9	Semi-finals
2	England	3	1	1	1	9	7	+2	4	Semi-finals
3	South Korea	3	1	0	2	9	14	−5	3	
4	Spain	3	0	1	2	5	8	−3	1	

Rules for classification: 1) points; 2) goal difference; 3) goals scored; 4) head-to-head result.

14 October 2001
11:00

England	5–2	South Korea
Jones 3', 70'; Grice 24', 39'; Mantell 31'	Report	Chul 42'; Kim Byung-Hoon 49'

Stadium:
Tasmanian Hockey Centre

14 October 2001
13:00

Germany	2–1	Spain
Weißenborn 13'; Duckwitz 34'	Report	Sala 49'

Stadium:
Tasmanian Hockey Centre

15 October 2001
12:00

England	2–2	Spain
Clarke 47'; Mantell 61'	Report	Freixa 51'; Tubau 52'

Stadium:
Tasmanian Hockey Centre

16 October 2001
19:00

Germany	7–3	South Korea
Witthaus 5'; Meinert 15'; Landshut 26'; Keller 35'; Weißenborn 49'; Emmerling 57'; Zeller 62'	Report	Chul 26'; Seo Jong-Ho 40'; Kang 56'

Stadium:
Tasmanian Hockey Centre

17 October 2001
17:30

South Korea	4–2	Spain
Yoon Sung-Hoon 28', 62'; Oh Dae-Keun 39'; Jin Joo 49'	Report	Sala 25'; Sojo 51'

Stadium:
Tasmanian Hockey Centre

17 October 2001
19:30

England	2–3	Germany
Mantell 39', 65'	Report	Hentschel 12', 57'; Witthaus 62'

Stadium:
Tasmanian Hockey Centre

==== Pool F ====
Pos	Team	Pld	W	D	L	GF	GA	GD	Pts	Qualification
1	Argentina	3	2	1	0	7	5	+2	7	Semi-finals
2	India	3	1	1	1	7	7	0	4	Semi-finals
3	Netherlands	3	1	0	2	9	9	0	3	
4	Australia	3	1	0	2	5	7	−2	3	

Rules for classification: 1) points; 2) goal difference; 3) goals scored; 4) head-to-head result.

14 October 2001
15:00

India	2–2	Argentina
Thakur 45'; Fernandes 65'	Report	Gilardi 36', 63'

Stadium:
Tasmanian Hockey Centre

14 October 2001
17:00

Netherlands	4–2	Australia
Kempink 17'; Weusthof 21'; Neumeier 50', 52'	Report	Brooks 25'; Schubert 66'

Stadium:
Tasmanian Hockey Centre

15 October 2001
19:00

India	1–2	Australia
Jugraj 39'	Report	Victory 44'; Hawes 58'

Stadium:
Tasmanian Hockey Centre

16 October 2001
13:00

Netherlands	2–3	Argentina
Bruinsma 4'; Koops 63'	Report	Cammareri 6'; Vila 20'; Pasquali 32'

Stadium:
Tasmanian Hockey Centre

17 October 2001
11:00

Australia	1–2	Argentina
Vivian-Taylor 66'	Report	Gilardi 22'; Garreta 70'

Stadium:
Tasmanian Hockey Centre

17 October 2001
13:00

Netherlands	3–4	India
Weusthof 17' van Weerd 22'; Reckers 49'	Report	Gagan 7'; Jugraj 10'; Prabhjot 48'; Kanwalpreet 57'

Stadium:
Tasmanian Hockey Centre

=== Non-Medal Round ===
==== Pool G ====
Pos	Team	Pld	W	D	L	GF	GA	GD	Pts
1	France	3	2	0	1	7	4	+3	6
2	New Zealand	3	2	0	1	8	6	+2	6
3	Ireland	3	1	0	2	3	5	−2	3
4	Canada	3	1	0	2	3	6	−3	3

Rules for classification: 1) points; 2) goal difference; 3) goals scored; 4) head-to-head result.

14 October 2001
09:00

Ireland	0–1	France
	Report	Goeudard-Comte 17'

Stadium:
Tasmanian Hockey Centre

14 October 2001
19:00

New Zealand	1–2	Canada
Henwood 5'	Report	Grimes 13'; Bath 50'

Stadium:
Tasmanian Hockey Centre

15 October 2001
17:00

Ireland	2–1	Canada
Harte 49'; Eakins 54'	Report	Joseph 57'

Stadium:
Tasmanian Hockey Centre

16 October 2001
17:00

New Zealand	4–3	France
Archibald 16', 63'; Barnett 16'; Brooker 64'	Report	C. Verrier 8'; Durchon 45'; Branquart 54'

Stadium:
Tasmanian Hockey Centre

17 October 2001
15:00

France	3–0	Canada
F. Verrier 25'; Durchon 61'; Branquart 68'	Report

Stadium:
Tasmanian Hockey Centre

17 October 2001
18:00

Ireland	1–3	New Zealand
Hobbs 35'	Report	Archibald 12'; Laurence 45'; Henwood 48'

Stadium:
Tasmanian Hockey Centre

==== Pool H ====
Pos	Team	Pld	W	D	L	GF	GA	GD	Pts
1	Malaysia	3	1	2	0	5	3	+2	5
2	South Africa	3	1	2	0	7	6	+1	5
3	Scotland	3	1	2	0	7	6	+1	5
4	Chile	3	0	0	3	5	9	−4	0

Rules for classification: 1) points; 2) goal difference; 3) goals scored; 4) head-to-head result.

14 October 2001
10:00

South Africa	3–2	Chile
Ravenscroft 34'; Haley 43'; Evans 60'	Report	Stein 19', 50'

Stadium:
Tasmanian Hockey Centre

14 October 2001
14:00

Scotland	1–1	Malaysia
Doherty 45'	Report	Fairuz 36'

Stadium:
Tasmanian Hockey Centre

15 October 2001
14:00

Scotland	3–2	Chile
Stott 43', 61'; Glass 70'	Report	Krainz 34'; Stein 47'

Stadium:
Tasmanian Hockey Centre

16 October 2001
11:00

South Africa	1–1	Malaysia
Symons 54'	Report	Kali 32'

Stadium:
Tasmanian Hockey Centre

17 October 2001
09:00

South Africa	3–3	Scotland
Royston 43'; Isaac 53'; Symons 70'	Report	Christie 32'; McCartney 41', 45'
Penalties
	3–2

Stadium:
Tasmanian Hockey Centre

17 October 2001
15:30

Chile	1–3	Malaysia
Stein 54'	Report	Jiwa 29'; Chua 33'; Fairuz 49'

Stadium:
Tasmanian Hockey Centre

=== Classification matches ===
==== Thirteenth to sixteenth place classification ====
Crossover
19 October 2001
Ireland	3
Chile	2
19 October 2001
Scotland	3
Canada	0

Thirteenth and fourteenth place
20 October 2001
Ireland	2
Scotland (a.e.t)	3
Fifteenth and sixteenth place
20 October 2001
Chile (a.e.t)	2
Canada	1

===== Crossover =====
19 October 2001
10:00

Ireland	3–2	Chile
Hobbs 48', 62'; Eakins 66'	Report	Stein 5'; Krainz 55'

Stadium:
Tasmanian Hockey Centre

19 October 2001
15:30

Scotland	3–0	Canada
Johnson 43'; Sewnauth 44'; Glass 55'	Report

Stadium:
Tasmanian Hockey Centre

===== Fifteenth and sixteenth place =====
20 October 2001
17:00

Chile	2–1 (a.e.t.)	Canada
Fingerhuth 57'; Zirpel 79'	Report	Lee 35'

Stadium:
Tasmanian Hockey Centre

===== Thirteenth and fourteenth place =====
20 October 2001
13:30

Ireland	2–3 (a.e.t.)	Scotland
Allen 16'; Jermyn 19'	Report	Johnson 61'; Sewnauth 65'; Glass 85'

Stadium:
Tasmanian Hockey Centre

==== Ninth to twelfth place classification ====
Crossover
19 October 2001
France (a.e.t)	2
South Africa	1
19 October 2001
Malaysia	2
New Zealand	3

Ninth and tenth place
20 October 2001
France	0
New Zealand	2
Eleventh and twelfth place
20 October 2001
South Africa (p.s.o)	3 (4)
Malaysia	3 (2)

===== Crossover =====
19 October 2001
09:00

France	2–1 (a.e.t.)	South Africa
Durchon 15'; Branquart 74'	Report	Thamin 21'

Stadium:
Tasmanian Hockey Centre

19 October 2001
11:30

Malaysia	2–3	New Zealand
Chua 57'; Fairuz 68'	Report	Laurence 25'; Shaw 48', 54'

Stadium:
Tasmanian Hockey Centre

===== Eleventh and twelfth place =====
20 October 2001
16:30

South Africa	3–3	Malaysia
Symons 44'; Ravenscroft 51', 60'	Report	Chua 6', 27'; Fairuz 40'
Penalties
	4–2

Stadium:
Tasmanian Hockey Centre

===== Ninth and tenth place =====
20 October 2001
14:00

France	0–2	New Zealand
	Report	Shaw 4'; Stephenson 9'

Stadium:
Tasmanian Hockey Centre

==== Fifth to eighth place classification ====
Crossover
20 October 2001
South Korea	1
Australia	4
20 October 2001
Netherlands	2
Spain	3

Fifth and sixth place
21 October 2001
Australia	0
Spain	2
Seventh and eighth place
21 October 2001
South Korea	3
Netherlands	2

===== Crossover =====
20 October 2001
09:00

South Korea	1–4	Australia
Yoon Sung-Hoon 37'	Report	Brooks 14'; Schubert 53'; Bullion 56'; Vivian-Taylor 64'

Stadium:
Tasmanian Hockey Centre

20 October 2001
11:30

Netherlands	2–3	Spain
van Weerd 14'; Derikx 24'	Report	Tubau 7'; Arbós 39'; Freixa 41'

Stadium:
Tasmanian Hockey Centre

===== Seventh and eighth place =====
21 October 2001
11:00

South Korea	3–2	Netherlands
Chul 18'; Seo Jong-Ho 33', 54'	Report	Weusthof 13'; Evers 47'

Stadium:
Tasmanian Hockey Centre

===== Fifth and sixth place =====
21 October 2001
10:00

Australia	0–2	Spain
	Report	Sojo 36'; Alegre 40'

Stadium:
Tasmanian Hockey Centre

==== First to fourth place classification ====
Semi-finals
19 October 2001
Germany	2
India	3
19 October 2001
Argentina	3
England	1

Final
21 October 2001
India	6
Argentina	1
Third and fourth place
21 October 2001
Germany	5
England	1

===== Semifinals =====
19 October 2001
17:30

Germany	2–3	India
Keller 52'; Witthaus 66'	Report	Kanwalpreet 2'; Inderjeet 23'; Halappa 34'

Stadium:
Tasmanian Hockey Centre

19 October 2001
20:00

Argentina	3–1	England
Paredes 13' del Negro 52'; Pasquali 64'	Report	Mantell 18'

Stadium:
Tasmanian Hockey Centre

===== Third and fourth place =====
21 October 2001
12:30

Germany	5–1	England
Weß 13', 19'; Bierdelack 33'; Keller 43'; Meinert 59'	Report	Middleton 40'

Stadium:
Tasmanian Hockey Centre

===== Final =====
21 October 2001
15:00

India	6–1	Argentina
Prabhjot 10'; Singh 19', 44'; Thakur 53', 56', 59'	Report	Cammareri 43'

Stadium:
Tasmanian Hockey Centre

== Awards ==
Topscorer	Best Goalkeeper	Best Player	Fair Play
(India) Deepak Thakur	(India) Devesh Chauhan	(Ireland) David Eakins	Netherlands

== Statistics ==
=== Final standings ===
As per statistical convention in field hockey, matches decided in extra time are counted as wins and losses, while matches decided by penalty shoot-outs are counted as draws.

Pos	Team	Pld	W	D	L	GF	GA	GD	Pts	Final result
1st place, gold medalist(s)	India	8	6	1	1	31	11	+20	19	Gold Medal
2nd place, silver medalist(s)	Argentina	8	5	1	2	20	14	+6	16	Silver Medal
3rd place, bronze medalist(s)	Germany	8	7	0	1	25	13	+12	21	Bronze Medal
4	England	8	3	2	3	17	17	0	11	Fourth place
5	Spain	8	4	1	3	24	14	+10	13	Eliminated in medal round
6	Australia	8	3	2	3	17	12	+5	11	Eliminated in medal round
7	South Korea	8	3	2	3	20	26	−6	11	Eliminated in medal round
8	Netherlands	8	3	1	4	20	17	+3	10	Eliminated in medal round
9	New Zealand	8	5	0	3	17	15	+2	15	Eliminated in group stage
10	France	8	3	1	4	12	13	−1	10	Eliminated in group stage
11	South Africa	8	2	3	3	17	20	−3	9	Eliminated in group stage
12	Malaysia	8	1	3	4	13	19	−6	6	Eliminated in group stage
13	Scotland	8	4	2	2	17	24	−7	14	Eliminated in group stage
14	Ireland	8	3	1	4	13	13	0	10	Eliminated in group stage
15	Chile	8	1	0	7	13	29	−16	3	Eliminated in group stage
16	Canada	8	1	0	7	6	25	−19	3	Eliminated in group stage
