= England men's national under-21 field hockey team =

England
- Association: England Hockey
Home	Away

Junior World Cup
- Appearances: 10 (first in 1985)
- Best result: 4th (1997, 2001)

EuroHockey Junior Championship
- Appearances: 21 (first in 1977)
- Best result: (silver) 2nd (1988, 1998, 2019)
Medal record
EuroHockey Junior Championship
Silver medal – second place	1988 Santander
Silver medal – second place	1998 Poznań
Silver medal – second place	2019 Valencia
Bronze medal – third place	1996 Vejle
Bronze medal – third place	2014 Waterloo

The England men's national under-21 field hockey team represents England in men's under-21 international field hockey and is controlled by England Hockey, the governing body for field hockey in England.

The England junior team took part in the Men's FIH Hockey Junior World Cup held at Madurai and Chennai, Tamil Nadu from 1 to 10 December 2025.

== Tournament record ==
=== Junior World Cup ===
- 1985 – 6th place
- 1989 – 7th place
- 1993 – 5th place
- 1997 – 4th place
- 2001 – 4th place
- 2005 – 9th place
- 2009 – 16th place
- 2013 – 14th place
- 2016 – 8th place
- 2021 – WD
- 2025 – 9th place
- 2027 – Qualified

=== EuroHockey Junior Championship ===
- 1977 – 4th place
- 1978 – 7th place
- 1981 – 7th place
- 1984 – 5th place
- 1988 – (silver)
- 1992 – 4th place
- 1996 – (bronze)
- 1998 – (silver)
- 2000 – 4th place
- 2002 – 4th place
- 2004 – 4th place
- 2006 – 5th place
- 2008 – 5th place
- 2010 – 4th place
- 2012 – 5th place
- 2014 – (bronze)
- 2017 – 5th place
- 2019 – (silver)
- 2022 – 6th place
- 2024 – 5th place
- 2026 – 6th place

== Current squad ==
The squad was announced on 24 October 2025 in 2025 FIH Hockey Junior World Cup.

Head coach: Jon Bleby
Manager: Paul Gannon.

No.	Pos.	Player	Date of birth (age)	Caps	Club
2		Oliver Rundle	12 April 2005 (aged 20)	0	(England) University of Nottingham
3		Nathan Gladman	15 January 2005 (aged 20)	17	(England) Exeter University
4		Ollly Bennett	5 December 2007 (aged 18)	5	(England) Oxted HC/Whitgift School
5		Kaden Draysey	27 December 2006 (aged 19)	12	(England) Exeter University
6		Tom Spreckley	21 April 2005 (aged 20)	26	(England) Loughborough Students
7		Alex Chihota	1 March 2004 (aged 21)	32	(England) Holcombe HC
8		Michael Royden	8 August 2005 (aged 20)	12	(England) Holcombe HC
9		Harrison Stone	27 May 2005 (aged 20)	32	(Germany) Münchner SC
10		Max Anderson (Captain)	23 April 2004 (aged 21)	32	(England) Surbiton HC
12		Monty Neave	22 October 2005 (aged 20)	21	(England) Loughborough Students
13		George Fletcher	21 October 2004 (aged 21)	0	(England) Beeston HC
15		Jonny Sturch-Hibbitt	22 January 2005 (aged 20)	16	(England) Exeter University
16		Jack Stamp	14 July 2007 (aged 18)	6	(England) University of Birmingham
17		Matthew Hughson	31 December 2004 (aged 21)	31	(England) Durham University
18		Ted Graves	26 November 2004 (aged 21)	22	(England) Hampstead & Westminster HC
19		Henry Markham	21 October 2004 (aged 21)	26	(England) Exeter University
21		Cole Pidcock	12 March 2004 (aged 21)	12	(England) Bowdon HC
22		Caspar Lea	25 February 2006 (aged 19)	12	(England) University of Birmingham
23	GK	Rory Mylroi	23 April 2006 (aged 19)	0	(England) Sevenoaks HC
26	GK	James Carleton	18 January 2005 (aged 20)	22	(England) Exeter University

== See also ==
- England men's national field hockey team
- England women's national under-21 field hockey team
