= 2005 Men's Hockey Junior World Cup =

8th edition of the Men's Hockey Junior World Cup

Rabo Junior World Cup 2005 Rotterdam Men

Tournament details
- Host country: Netherlands
- City: Rotterdam
- Dates: 29 June – 10 July
- Teams: 16 (from 5 confederations)
- Venue: Hazelaarweg Stadion

Final positions
- Champions: Argentina (1st title)
- Runner-up: Australia
- Third place: Spain

Tournament statistics
- Matches played: 62
- Goals scored: 317 (5.11 per match)
- Top scorer: (Australia) Colin Hennessy (15 goals)
- Best player: (Argentina) Lucas Vila

The 2005 Men's Hockey Junior World Cup was the eighth edition of the Men's Hockey Junior World Cup, the quadrennial world championship for men's national under-21 national field hockey teams organized by the International Hockey Federation. It was held from 29 June to 10 July 2005 in Rotterdam, Netherlands.

Argentina won their first title by defeating Australia 2–1 in the final. Spain won the bronze medal by defeating the defending champions India 6–5 after penalty strokes after the match finished 1–1 after extra time.

== Preliminary round ==
All times are local, CEST (UTC+2).

=== Pool A ===
| Pos | Team | Pld | W | D | L | GF | GA | GD | Pts | Qualification |
|---|---|---|---|---|---|---|---|---|---|---|
| 1 | South Korea | 3 | 3 | 0 | 0 | 19 | 4 | +15 | 9 | Second round |
| 2 | Spain | 3 | 2 | 0 | 1 | 8 | 3 | +5 | 6 | Second round |
| 3 | England | 3 | 1 | 0 | 2 | 15 | 6 | +9 | 3 | Second round |
| 4 | Mexico | 3 | 0 | 0 | 3 | 0 | 29 | −29 | 0 | |

Source: FIH

29 June 2005
12:00

| South Korea | 11–0 | Mexico |
|---|---|---|
| Jang 3', 44', 49', 68', 69'; Lee J. 20'; Hong 35'; Choi 37'; Kim You. 41', 51'; Yeo 56' | Report |

Umpires:
Erik Klein-Nagelvoort (NED)
Raghu Prasad (IND)

29 June 2005
14:30

| Spain | 1–0 | England |
|---|---|---|
| Alegre 18' | Report |

Umpires:
Amarjit Singh (MAS)
Faiz Muhammad Faizi (PAK)

30 June 2005
12:30

| Mexico | 0–12 | England |
|---|---|---|
| | Report | Lane 9'; Cheesman 13', 32', 44'; Mantell 15', 21', 65'; Jackson 17', 48'; D'Souza 26', 47'; Watts 62' |

Umpires:
Nigel Iggo (NZL)
Constantine Soteriades (USA)

30 June 2005
15:00

| South Korea | 3–1 | Spain |
|---|---|---|
| Jang 28', 52'; Kim You. 64' | Report | Alegre 48' |

Umpires:
Christian Blasch (GER)
Satinder Kumar (IND)

2 July 2005
14:00

| Spain | 6–0 | Mexico |
|---|---|---|
| Padros 10', 50'; Fabregas 13'; Fernández 23', 68'; Rodríguez 43' | Report |

Umpires:
Albert Marcano (TRI)
Sayed Ab Del Rady (EGY)

2 July 2005
17:00

| England | 3–5 | South Korea |
|---|---|---|
| Mantell 22', 23'; Flanagan 33' | Report | Jang 15'; Lee J. 28'; Choi 50'; Kim You. 64'; Yeo 66' |

Umpires:
Peter Wright (RSA)
Raghu Prasad (IND)

=== Pool B ===
| Pos | Team | Pld | W | D | L | GF | GA | GD | Pts | Qualification |
|---|---|---|---|---|---|---|---|---|---|---|
| 1 | Argentina | 3 | 3 | 0 | 0 | 5 | 2 | +3 | 9 | Second round |
| 2 | Germany | 3 | 2 | 0 | 1 | 13 | 11 | +2 | 6 | Second round |
| 3 | Malaysia | 3 | 1 | 0 | 2 | 9 | 9 | 0 | 3 | Second round |
| 4 | South Africa | 3 | 0 | 0 | 3 | 4 | 9 | −5 | 0 | |

Source: FIH

29 June 2005
17:00

| Germany | 2–3 | Argentina |
|---|---|---|
| Fürste 50', 58' | Report | Vila 40'; Argento 44'; Rossi 55' |

Umpires:
Nathan Stagno (GIB)
Andy Mair (SCO)

29 June 2005
18:30

| South Africa | 1–4 | Malaysia |
|---|---|---|
| Geldenhuys 22' | Report | Misron 2', 68'; Mohd Rejab 28'; Abu 33' |

Umpires:
Adam Kearns (AUS)
Roel van Eert (NED)

30 June 2005
17:00

| Malaysia | 0–1 | Argentina |
|---|---|---|
| | Report | Ibarra 2' |

Umpires:
Juan Manuel Requena (ESP)
Erik Klein-Nagelvoort (NED)

30 June 2005
19:30

| South Africa | 3–4 | Germany |
|---|---|---|
| Reid-Ross 14'; Smith 35'; Geldenhuys 53' | Report | Braun 21', 51', 69'; Stralkowski 49' |

Umpires:
James Pilgrim (ENG)
Raghu Prasad (IND)

2 July 2005
11:00

| Germany | 7–5 | Malaysia |
|---|---|---|
| Stralkowski 9', 20'; Fürste 29', 31'; Korn 38'; Blasberg 48'; Froeschle 58' | Report | Mohd Rejab 27', 42', 44', 55'; Abu 51' |

Umpires:
Kim Hong-Lae (KOR)
Roel van Eert (NED)

2 July 2005
12:00

| Argentina | 1–0 | South Africa |
|---|---|---|
| Vila 15' | Report |

Umpires:
Nathan Stagno (GIB)
Richmond Attipoe (GHA)

=== Pool C ===
| Pos | Team | Pld | W | D | L | GF | GA | GD | Pts | Qualification |
|---|---|---|---|---|---|---|---|---|---|---|
| 1 | Australia | 3 | 3 | 0 | 0 | 22 | 3 | +19 | 9 | Second round |
| 2 | Pakistan | 3 | 2 | 0 | 1 | 7 | 5 | +2 | 6 | Second round |
| 3 | Belgium | 3 | 1 | 0 | 2 | 4 | 10 | −6 | 3 | Second round |
| 4 | Chile | 3 | 0 | 0 | 3 | 1 | 16 | −15 | 0 | |

Source: FIH

29 June 2005
11:00

| Australia | 12–0 | Chile |
|---|---|---|
| Hennessy 2', 11', 38', 45'; Cleghorn 5', 9'; Charlesworth 17'; Davidson 23'; Turner 34', 49'; Abbott 44'; Brown 69' | Report |

Umpires:
Satinder Kumar (IND)
Peter Wright (RSA)

29 June 2005
13:30

| Pakistan | 3–1 | Belgium |
|---|---|---|
| Imran 28', 64'; Arif 66' | Report | Dewever 3' |

Umpires:
James Pilgrim (ENG)
Enzo Caravetta (ARG)

30 June 2005
12:00

| Belgium | 1–7 | Australia |
|---|---|---|
| Truyens 29' | Report | Hennessy 2', 35', 53'; Knowles 5', 38'; Hotchkis 61'; Abbott 69' |

Umpires:
Andy Mair (SCO)
Sayed Ab Del Rady (EGY)

30 June 2005
14:30

| Chile | 1–2 | Pakistan |
|---|---|---|
| Kannegiesser 49' | Report | Yasir 32'; Imran 34' |

Umpires:
Nathan Stagno (GIB)
Albert Marcano (TRI)

2 July 2005
10:00

| Chile | 0–2 | Belgium |
|---|---|---|
| | Report | Buchet 5'; Truyens 39' |

Umpires:
Constantine Soteriades (USA)
Juan Manuel Requena (ESP)

2 July 2005
13:00

| Pakistan | 2–3 | Australia |
|---|---|---|
| Tariq 28'; Abbasi 56' | Report | Smyth 29'; Hennessy 53' |

Umpires:
Christian Blasch (GER)
Amarjit Singh (MAS)

=== Pool D ===
| Pos | Team | Pld | W | D | L | GF | GA | GD | Pts | Qualification |
|---|---|---|---|---|---|---|---|---|---|---|
| 1 | India | 3 | 3 | 0 | 0 | 11 | 4 | +7 | 9 | Second round |
| 2 | Netherlands (H) | 3 | 2 | 0 | 1 | 11 | 4 | +7 | 6 | Second round |
| 3 | Egypt | 3 | 1 | 0 | 2 | 4 | 10 | −6 | 3 | Second round |
| 4 | Poland | 3 | 0 | 0 | 3 | 4 | 12 | −8 | 0 | |

Source: FIH
(H) Hosts

29 June 2005
16:00

| India | 4–1 | Egypt |
|---|---|---|
| Sandeep 5', 27', 55'; Gupta 59' | Report | Elbadry 52' |

Umpires:
Christian Blasch (GER)
Juan Manuel Requena (ESP)

29 June 2005
19:30

| Netherlands | 6–0 | Poland |
|---|---|---|
| N. Meijer 9'; Hofman 15', 33', 51'; Steller 50' van der Horst 63' | Report |

Umpires:
Nigel Iggo (NZL)
Richmond Attipoe (GHA)

30 June 2005
17:30

| Poland | 2–3 | India |
|---|---|---|
| Rozek 38'; Szyplik 66' | Report | Gowdalli Mallappa 22'; Lakra 43'; Sandeep 56' |

Umpires:
Kim Hong-Lae (KOR)
Amarjit Singh (MAS)

30 June 2005
20:00

| Egypt | 0–4 | Netherlands |
|---|---|---|
| | Report | O. Meijer 8'; Rohof 14'; Welten 18'; Reinstra 55' |

Umpires:
Faiz Muhammad Faizi (PAK)
Adam Kearns (AUS)

2 July 2005
15:00

| Netherlands | 1–4 | India |
|---|---|---|
| Steller 38' | Report | Sandeep 11', 60'; Khandekar 14', 62' |

Umpires:
Andy Mair (SCO)
Nigel Iggo (NZL)

2 July 2005
16:00

| Poland | 2–3 | Egypt |
|---|---|---|
| Rozek 11'; Szyplik 70' | Report | Abd El Aziz 18'; Haggag 39'; A. Ahmed 55' |

Umpires:
James Pilgrim (ENG)
Enzo Caravetta (ARG)

== Second round ==
Points obtained against qualified teams from the same group were carried over.

=== Pool E ===
| Pos | Team | Pld | W | D | L | GF | GA | GD | Pts | Qualification |
|---|---|---|---|---|---|---|---|---|---|---|
| 1 | India | 5 | 4 | 0 | 1 | 12 | 7 | +5 | 12 | Semi-finals |
| 2 | Spain | 5 | 4 | 0 | 1 | 10 | 5 | +5 | 12 | Semi-finals |
| 3 | Netherlands (H) | 5 | 3 | 0 | 2 | 15 | 8 | +7 | 9 | |
| 4 | South Korea | 5 | 3 | 0 | 2 | 14 | 13 | +1 | 9 | |
| 5 | England | 5 | 0 | 1 | 4 | 6 | 14 | −8 | 1 | |
| 6 | Egypt | 5 | 0 | 1 | 4 | 6 | 16 | −10 | 1 | |

Source: FIH
(H) Hosts

3 July 2005
14:00

| Spain | 4–0 | India |
|---|---|---|
| Alegre 4', 45'; Enrique 29'; Lainz 57' | Report |

Umpires:
Christian Blasch (GER)
Peter Wright (RSA)

3 July 2005
15:00

| South Korea | 4–2 | Egypt |
|---|---|---|
| Jang 25', 35', 46'; Hong 56' | Report | M. Hussein 21', 39' |

Umpires:
Adam Kearns (AUS)
Enzo Caravetta (ARG)

3 July 2005
16:00

| England | 1–5 | Netherlands |
|---|---|---|
| Lane 45' | Report | N. Meijer 8'; O. Meijer 27'; Hofman 56', 64'; Rohof 68' |

Umpires:
Nathan Stagno (GIB)
Kim Hong-Lae (KOR)

5 July 2005
17:00

| Egypt | 2–2 | England |
|---|---|---|
| Hanafy 14', 23' | Report | Jackson 37'; Watts 66' |

Umpires:
Peter Wright (RSA)
Richmond Attipoe (GHA)

5 July 2005
18:30

| South Korea | 1–3 | India |
|---|---|---|
| Hong 34' | Report | Lakra 14'; Khandekar 16'; Sandeep 57' |

Umpires:
Nigel Iggo (NZL)
Nathan Stagno (GIB)

5 July 2005
19:30

| Netherlands | 1–2 | Spain |
|---|---|---|
| O. Meijer 49' | Report | Rodríguez 18'; Alegre 48' |

Umpires:
Christian Blasch (GER)
Amarjit Singh (MAS)

6 July 2005
17:00

| Spain | 2–1 | Egypt |
|---|---|---|
| Delas 38'; Rodríguez 67' | Report | Elbadry 67' |

Umpires:
Peter Wright (RSA)
Adam Kearns (AUS)

6 July 2005
17:30

| England | 0–1 | India |
|---|---|---|
| | Report | Sandeep 27' |

Umpires:
Nathan Stagno (GIB)
Enzo Caravetta (ARG)

6 July 2005
20:00

| South Korea | 1–4 | Netherlands |
|---|---|---|
| Hong 17' | Report | Rohof 43'; Reinstra 57'; N. Meijer 65'; Jolie 69' |

Umpires:
Christian Blasch (GER)
Nigel Iggo (NZL)

=== Pool F ===
| Pos | Team | Pld | W | D | L | GF | GA | GD | Pts | Qualification |
|---|---|---|---|---|---|---|---|---|---|---|
| 1 | Argentina | 5 | 3 | 2 | 0 | 8 | 4 | +4 | 11 | Semi-finals |
| 2 | Australia | 5 | 3 | 1 | 1 | 21 | 10 | +11 | 10 | Semi-finals |
| 3 | Germany | 5 | 3 | 0 | 2 | 16 | 17 | −1 | 9 | |
| 4 | Pakistan | 5 | 2 | 1 | 2 | 8 | 8 | 0 | 7 | |
| 5 | Malaysia | 5 | 1 | 1 | 3 | 13 | 15 | −2 | 4 | |
| 6 | Belgium | 5 | 0 | 1 | 4 | 6 | 18 | −12 | 1 | |

Source: FIH

3 July 2005
11:00

| Pakistan | 0–2 | Germany |
|---|---|---|
| | Report | Stralkowski 26'; Draguhn 55' |

Umpires:
Amarjit Singh (MAS)
Andy Mair (SCO)

3 July 2005
12:00

| Australia | 3–3 | Malaysia |
|---|---|---|
| Hennessy 27'; Knowles 58'; Cleghorn 61' | Report | Mohd Rejab 6', 45', 63' |

Umpires:
Erik Klein-Nagelvoort (NED)
Raghu Prasad (IND)

3 July 2005
18:00

| Belgium | 0–0 | Argentina |
|---|---|---|
| | Report |

Umpires:
Roel van Eert (NED)
Satinder Kumar (IND)

5 July 2005
12:00

| Pakistan | 1–1 | Argentina |
|---|---|---|
| Muhammad Khalid 58' | Report | Vila 62' |

Umpires:
Erik Klein-Nagelvoort (NED)
Juan Manuel Requena (ESP)

5 July 2005
14:30

| Australia | 7–1 | Germany |
|---|---|---|
| Burcher 5'; Ockenden 19', 62'; Hennessy 27', 38'; Cleghorn 51'; Abbott 55' | Report | Witthaus 49' |

Umpires:
Andy Mair (SCO)
Satinder Kumar (IND)

5 July 2005
16:00

| Malaysia | 4–2 | Belgium |
|---|---|---|
| Mohd Rejab 11', 55', 60'; Singh 22' | Report | Truyens 35'; Dubois 46' |

Umpires:
James Pilgrim (ENG)
Faiz Muhammad Faizi (PAK)

6 July 2005
12:30

| Argentina | 3–1 | Australia |
|---|---|---|
| Vila 30', 53'; Brunet 69' | Report | Davidson 49' |

Umpires:
Raghu Prasad (IND)
Roel van Eert (NED)

6 July 2005
15:00

| Pakistan | 2–1 | Malaysia |
|---|---|---|
| Muhammad Khalid 18'; A. Muhammad 70' | Report | Mohd Rejab 12' |

Umpires:
James Pilgrim (ENG)
Satinder Kumar (IND)

6 July 2005
19:30

| Germany | 4–2 | Belgium |
|---|---|---|
| Korn 23', 64'; Witte 47'; Draguhn 59' | Report | Massion 9'; Schuermans 59' |

Umpires:
Juan Manuel Requena (ESP)
Kim Hong-Lae (KOR)

== Thirteenth to sixteenth place classification ==
=== Pool G ===
| Pos | Team | Pld | W | D | L | GF | GA | GD | Pts |
|---|---|---|---|---|---|---|---|---|---|
| 1 | South Africa | 3 | 3 | 0 | 0 | 21 | 1 | +20 | 9 |
| 2 | Poland | 3 | 1 | 1 | 1 | 9 | 10 | −1 | 4 |
| 3 | Chile | 3 | 1 | 0 | 2 | 6 | 11 | −5 | 3 |
| 4 | Mexico | 3 | 0 | 1 | 2 | 4 | 18 | −14 | 1 |

Source: FIH

3 July 2005
13:00

| Mexico | 0–9 | South Africa |
|---|---|---|
| | Report | Reid-Ross 7', 38'; Tsolekile 41'; Madsen 45'; Smith 49', 52'; Phillips 64', 70'; Haley 66' |

Umpires:
Faiz Muhammad Faizi (PAK)
Constantine Soteriades (USA)

3 July 2005
17:00

| Chile | 1–4 | Poland |
|---|---|---|
| Villaseca 60' | Report | Walkowiak 11'; Rozek 27'; Czaplinski 32'; Szyplik 58' |

Umpires:
Richmond Attipoe (GHA)
Sayed Ab Del Rady (EGY)

5 July 2005
11:00

| Chile | 5–0 | Mexico |
|---|---|---|
| Thiermann 12', 45'; Villaseca 48'; Berczely 64'; Fernández 70' | Report |

Umpires:
Albert Marcano (TRI)
Kim Hong-Lae (KOR)

5 July 2005
13:30

| South Africa | 5–1 | Poland |
|---|---|---|
| Madsen 16'; Phillips 24'; Harper 34'; Cronje 51'; Geldenhuys 60' | Report | Semonowicz 62' |

Umpires:
Roel van Eert (NED)
Adam Kearns (AUS)

6 July 2005
12:00

| Poland | 4–4 | Mexico |
|---|---|---|
| Rozek 2', 7'; Rataj 47', 60' | Report | E. García 17'; Avila 19'; R. García 35', 39' |

Umpires:
Constantine Soteriades (USA)
Sayed Ab Del Rady (EGY)

6 July 2005
14:30

| South Africa | 7–0 | Chile |
|---|---|---|
| Geldenhuys 17'; McConkey 18', 28'; Madsen 21'; Harper 41'; Smith 55'; Cronje 69' | Report |

Umpires:
Erik Klein-Nagelvoort (NED)
Albert Marcano (TRI)

=== Fifteenth and sixteenth place ===
9 July 2005
11:30

| Chile | 3–1 | Mexico |
|---|---|---|
| Kapsch 7'; Kannegiesser 33'; Berczely 44' | Report | R. García 62' |

Umpires:
Faiz Muhammad Faizi (PAK)
Albert Marcano (TRI)

=== Thirteenth and fourteenth place ===
9 July 2005
14:00

| South Africa | 5–3 | Poland |
|---|---|---|
| Geldenhuys 10'; Phillips 12'; McConkey 14'; Tsolekile 30', 47' | Report | Szyplik 52'; Plewa 64'; Szrejter 67' |

Umpires:
Sayed Ab Del Rady (EGY)
Richmond Attipoe (GHA)

== Ninth to twelfth place classification ==
=== Bracket ===
Cross-overss
8 July
Malaysia | 2
Egypt | 1
8 July
England | 3
Belgium | 1

Ninth place
9 July
Malaysia | 2
England (a.e.t.) | 3
Eleventh place
9 July
Egypt | 0
Belgium | 3

=== Cross-overs ===
8 July 2005
13:00

| Malaysia | 2–1 | Egypt |
|---|---|---|
| Kevinder 36'; Ismail 46' | Report | Hanafy 69' |

Umpires:
Nathan Stagno (GIB)
Kim Hong-Lae (KOR)

8 July 2005
15:30

| England | 3–1 | Belgium |
|---|---|---|
| Mantell 24'; Dixon 67'; Watts 70' | Report | Schuermans 65' |

Umpires:
Raghu Prasad (IND)
Erik Klein-Nagelvoort (NED)

=== Eleventh and twelfth place ===
9 July 2005
12:30

| Egypt | 0–3 | Belgium |
|---|---|---|
| | Report | Truyens 23', 44'; Tys 49' |

Umpires:
Peter Wright (RSA)
Constantine Soteriades (USA)

=== Ninth and tenth place ===
9 July 2005
15:00

| Malaysia | 2–3 (a.e.t.) | England |
|---|---|---|
| Tengku 23'; Kevinder 62' | Report | Watts 40'; Dixon 57'; Jackson 72' |

Umpires:
Enzo Caravetta (ARG)
Adam Kearns (AUS)

== Fifth to eighth place classification ==
=== Bracket ===
Cross-overs
8 July
Germany (a.e.t.) | 5
South Korea | 4
8 July
Netherlands | 4
Pakistan | 1

Fifth place
10 July
Germany | 3 (7)
Netherlands (p.s.) | 3 (8)
Seventh place
10 July
South Korea | 1
Pakistan | 6

=== Cross-overs ===
8 July 2005
12:00

| Germany | 5–4 (a.e.t.) | South Korea |
|---|---|---|
| Korn 15', 70'; Weß 42'; Witthaus 55'; Draguhn 74' | Report | Jang 8', 53'; Lee J. 17'; Hong 37' |

Umpires:
Satinder Kumar (IND)
Roel van Eert (NED)

8 July 2005
14:30

| Netherlands | 4–1 | Pakistan |
|---|---|---|
| Van der Horst 42', 53', 56'; Van Straten 51' | Report | Imran 24' |

Umpires:
James Pilgrim (ENG)
Juan Manuel Requena (ESP)

=== Seventh and eighth place ===
10 July 2005
11:00

| South Korea | 1–6 | Pakistan |
|---|---|---|
| Jang 38' | Report | Tariq 11'; Syed 25', 40', 53', 56'; Muhammad Akhtar 54' |

Umpires:
Raghu Prasad (IND)
James Pilgrim (ENG)

=== Fifth and sixth place ===
10 July 2005
10:00

| Germany | 3–3 (a.e.t.) | Netherlands |
|---|---|---|
| Froeschle 15'; Witthaus 33'; Draguhn 45' | Report | Van der Horst 5'; O. Meijer 10'; Kessing 47' |
Penalties
| Korn (penalty shoot-out scored); Draguhn (penalty shoot-out scored); Weß (penalty shoot-out scored); Witte (penalty shoot-out missed); Braun (penalty shoot-out scored); Draguhn (penalty shoot-out scored); Braun (penalty shoot-out scored); Witte (penalty shoot-out scored); Weß (penalty shoot-out missed) | 7–8 | (penalty shoot-out scored) Van der Horst; (penalty shoot-out scored) Rohof; (penalty shoot-out scored) Vermeulen; (penalty shoot-out scored) Maartens; (penalty shoot-out missed) Hofman; (penalty shoot-out scored) Van der Horst; (penalty shoot-out scored) Rohof; (penalty shoot-out scored) Maartens; (penalty shoot-out scored) Vermeulen |

Umpires:
Satinder Kumar (IND)
Juan Manuel Requena (ESP)

== First to fourth place classification ==
=== Bracket ===
Semi-finals
8 July
Argentina (a.e.t.) | 2
Spain | 1
8 July
India | 2
Australia | 3

Final
10 July
Argentina | 2
Australia | 1
Third place
10 July
Spain (p.s.) | 1 (5)
India | 1 (4)

=== Semi-finals ===
8 July 2005
17:00

| Argentina | 2–1 (a.e.t.) | Spain |
|---|---|---|
| Rossi 54'; Ibarra 76' | Report | Alegre 23' |

Umpires:
Christian Blasch (GER)
Nigel Iggo (NZL)

8 July 2005
19:30

| India | 2–3 | Australia |
|---|---|---|
| Khandekar 19'; Sandeep 31' | Report | Abbott 42'; Hennessy 49', 54' |

Umpires:
Amrjit Singh (MAS)
Andy Mair (SCO)

=== Third and fourth place ===
10 July 2005
12:30

| Spain | 1–1 (a.e.t.) | India |
|---|---|---|
| Rodríguez 38' | Report | Sandeep 8' |
Penalties
| Delas (penalty shoot-out scored); Rodríguez (penalty shoot-out scored); Alegre (penalty shoot-out scored); Enrich (penalty shoot-out scored); Borrell (penalty shoot-out scored) | 5–4 | (penalty shoot-out missed) Gupta; (penalty shoot-out scored) Mahadik; (penalty shoot-out scored) Sandeep; (penalty shoot-out scored) Khandekar; (penalty shoot-out scored) Ajmer |

Umpires:
Nathan Stagno (GIB)
Erik Klein-Nagelvoort (NED)

=== Final ===
10 July 2005
15:00

| Argentina | 2–1 | Australia |
|---|---|---|
| Vila 40'; Ibarra 70' | Report | Hennessy 34' |

Umpires:
Christian Blasch (GER)
Amarjit Singh (MAS)

== Statistics ==
=== Final standings ===
| Pos | Team |
|---|---|
| 1st place, gold medalist(s) | Argentina |
| 2nd place, silver medalist(s) | Australia |
| 3rd place, bronze medalist(s) | Spain |
| 4 | India |
| 5 | Netherlands (H) |
| 6 | Germany |
| 7 | Pakistan |
| 8 | South Korea |
| 9 | England |
| 10 | Malaysia |
| 11 | Belgium |
| 12 | Egypt |
| 13 | South Africa |
| 14 | Poland |
| 15 | Chile |
| 16 | Mexico |

Source: FIH
(H) Host

=== Awards ===
| Player of the Tournament | Top Goalscorer | Most Promising Player | Fair Play |
|---|---|---|---|
| (Argentina) Lucas Vila | (Australia) Colin Hennessy | (Malaysia) Kevinder Singh | Mexico |

=== Goalscorers ===
There were 317 goals scored in 62 matches, for an average of 5.11 goals per match.

15 goals

- (Australia) Colin Hennessy

14 goals

- (South Korea) Jang Jong-Hyun

12 goals

- (Malaysia) Zulkifli Muhammad Rejab

10 goals

- (India) Sandeep Singh

6 goals

- (Argentina) Lucas Vila
- (England) Simon Mantell
- (Spain) David Alegre

5 goals

- (Belgium) Jérôme Truyens
- (Germany) Oliver Korn
- (Netherlands) Rogier Hofman
- (Netherlands) Robert van der Horst
- (Poland) Piotr Rozek
- (South Africa) Pierre-Gerard Geldenhuys
- (South Korea) Hong Sung-Kweon

4 goals

- (Australia) Desmond Abbott
- (Australia) Thomas Cleghorn
- (England) Ashley Jackson
- (England) Andrew Watts
- (Germany) Sebatian Draughn
- (Germany) Moritz Fürste
- (Germany) Thilo Stralkowski
- (India) Tushar Khandekar
- (Netherlands) Olmer Meijer
- (Pakistan) Muhammad Imran
- (Pakistan) Imran Warsi Syed
- (Poland) Karol Szypłik
- (South Africa) Leroy Phillips
- (South Africa) Austin Smith
- (South Korea) Kim Young-Jin
- (Spain) Jorge Rodríguez

3 goals

- (Argentina) Pedro Ibarra
- (Australia) Mark Knowles
- (Egypt) Mahmoud Hanafy
- (England) Darren Cheesman
- (Germany) Richard Braun
- (Germany) Tim Witthaus
- (Malaysia) Ismail Abu
- (Malaysia) Kevinder Singh
- (Mexico) Roberto García
- (Netherlands) Nicholas Meijer
- (Netherlands) Teun Rohof
- (South Africa) Matthew McConkey
- (South Africa) Wayne Madsen
- (South Africa) Justin Reid-Ross
- (South Africa) Lungile Tsolekile
- (South Korea) Lee Jong-Soo

2 goals

- (Argentina) Lucas Rossi
- (Australia) Iain Davidson
- (Australia) Eddie Ockenden
- (Australia) Glenn Turner
- (Belgium) Jeremy Schuermans
- (Chile) Alexis Berczely
- (Chile) Thomás Kannegiesser
- (Chile) Alfredo Thiermann
- (Chile) Diego Villasesca
- (Egypt) Mahmoud Elbadry
- (Egypt) Mohamed Hussein
- (England) Adam Dixon
- (England) Warren D'Souza
- (England) Richard Lane
- (Germany) Jonathan Fröschle
- (India) Birendra Lakra
- (Malaysia) Azli Misron
- (Netherlands) Roderick Reinstra
- (Netherlands) Tjeerd Steller
- (Pakistan) Tariq Aziz
- (Pakistan) Mahmood Muhammad Khalid
- (Poland) Waldemar Rataj
- (South Africa) Andrew Cronje
- (South Africa) Marvin Harper
- (South Korea) Yeo Chang-Yong
- (South Korea) Choi Yong-Ho
- (Spain) Juan Fernández La Villa
- (Spain) Roger Padros

1 goal

- (Argentina) Tomás Argento
- (Argentina) Manuel Brunet
- (Australia) Kiel Brown
- (Australia) Ian Burcher
- (Australia) Jonathon Charlesworth
- (Australia) Daniel Hotchkis
- (Australia) Ian Smyth
- (Belgium) Cédric Buchet
- (Belgium) Mike Dewever
- (Belgium) Maurice Dubois
- (Belgium) Antoine Massion
- (Belgium) Maxime Tys
- (Chile) Fernando Fernández
- (Chile) Sebastián Kapsch
- (Egypt) Karim Abd El Aziz
- (Egypt) Amr Ahmed
- (Egypt) Tarek Haggag
- (England) Peter Flanagan
- (Germany) Tim Blasberg
- (Germany) Benjamin Weß
- (Germany) Stefan Witte
- (India) Prasad Gowdalli Mallappa
- (India) Vivek Gupta
- (Malaysia) Tengku Tajuddin
- (Mexico) Luis Avila
- (Mexico) Edgar García
- (Netherlands) Wouter Jolie
- (Netherlands) Eby Kessing
- (Netherlands) Wouter van Straten
- (Netherlands) Pieter Welten
- (Pakistan) Shakeel Abbasi
- (Pakistan) Muhammad Akhtar Ali
- (Pakistan) Muhammad Arif
- (Pakistan) Adnan Zakir Muhammad
- (Pakistan) Islam Yasir
- (Poland) Mateusz Czaplinski
- (Poland) David Plewer
- (Poland) Artur Semonowicz
- (Poland) Rafal Szrejter
- (Poland) Maciej Walkowiak
- (South Africa) Craig Haley
- (Spain) Miguel Delas
- (Spain) Sergio Enrique
- (Spain) Jordi Fabregas
- (Spain) Juan Lainz

== See also ==
- 2005 Women's Hockey Junior World Cup
