= 1982 Men's Hockey Junior World Cup =

2nd edition of the Men's FIH Hockey Junior World Cup

1982 Men's FIH Hockey Junior World Cup
Tournament details
- Host country: Malaysia
- City: Kuala Lumpur
- Dates: 14–28 August
- Teams: 11 (from 5 confederations)
- Venue(s): Tun Abdul Razak Stadium

Final positions
- Champions: West Germany (1st title)
- Runner-up: Australia
- Third place: Pakistan

Tournament statistics
- Matches played: 35
- Goals scored: 184 (5.26 per match)
- Best player: (West Germany) Erhard Schmidt
- Fair play award: Canada

The 1982 Men's FIH Hockey Junior World Cup was the 2nd edition of the Men's FIH Hockey Junior World Cup, the triennial men's under-21 field hockey world championship organized by the International Hockey Federation. It was held at the Tun Abdul Razak Stadium in Kuala Lumpur, Malaysia from 14 to 28 August 1982.

Pakistan were the defending champions but lost to Australia in the semifinals. West Germany won their first title by defeating Australia in the final.

== Teams ==
Alongside the host nation, Malaysia, a further ten teams qualified for the event.

- Australia
- Canada
- India
- Kenya
- Malaysia
- Netherlands
- New Zealand
- Pakistan (defending champions)
- Singapore
- Spain
- West Germany

== Results ==
=== Preliminary round ===
==== Pool A ====
Pos	Team	Pld	W	D	L	GF	GA	GD	Pts	Qualification
1	Pakistan	4	3	1	0	17	6	+11	7	Semi-finals
2	Malaysia (H)	4	2	1	1	14	10	+4	5	Semi-finals
3	Netherlands	4	2	0	2	12	14	−2	4	
4	Spain	4	2	0	2	9	12	−3	4	
5	New Zealand	4	0	0	4	4	14	−10	0	

Source: FIH
Rules for classification: 1) points; 2) head-to-head result; 3) goal difference; 4) goals scored.
(H) Hosts

14 August 1982
16:30

Spain	3–4	Malaysia
	Report

15 August 1982
09:15

Pakistan	6–3	Netherlands
	Report

15 August 1982
17:15

Spain	2–1	New Zealand
	Report

16 August 1982
15:45

Netherlands	4–3	Malaysia
	Report

18 August 1982
09:15

Netherlands	2–3	Spain
	Report

18 August 1982
17:15

New Zealand	0–4	Pakistan
	Report

20 August 1982
17:15

Malaysia	5–1	New Zealand
	Report

21 August 1982
07:45

Pakistan	5–1	Spain
	Report

21 August 1982
17:15

New Zealand	2–3	Netherlands
	Report

22 August 1982
17:15

Malaysia	2–2	Pakistan
	Report

==== Pool B ====
Pos	Team	Pld	W	D	L	GF	GA	GD	Pts	Qualification
1	West Germany	5	4	1	0	17	0	+17	9	Semi-finals
2	Australia	5	3	1	1	16	7	+9	7	Semi-finals
3	India	5	3	1	1	25	3	+22	7	
4	Canada	5	2	1	2	13	15	−2	5	
5	Kenya	5	1	0	4	4	16	−12	2	
6	Singapore	5	0	0	5	0	34	−34	0	

Source: FIH
Rules for classification: 1) points; 2) head-to-head result; 3) goal difference; 4) goals scored.

14 August 1982
08:00

West Germany	0–0	India
	Report

15 August 1982
07:45

Australia	3–3	Canada
	Report

15 August 1982
15:45

Kenya	2–0	Singapore
	Report

16 August 1982
08:00

India	8–0	Canada
	Report

16 August 1982
17:15

West Germany	7–0	Kenya
	Report

17 August 1982
08:00

Singapore	0–6	Australia
	Report

18 August 1982
07:45

Australia	4–0	Kenya
	Report

18 August 1982
15:45

India	13–0	Singapore
	Report

19 August 1982
08:00

Canada	0–2	West Germany
	Report

20 August 1982
15:45

Australia	3–2	India
	Report

21 August 1982
09:15

Singapore	0–6	West Germany
	Report

21 August 1982
15:45

India	2–0	Kenya
	Report

22 August 1982
08:00

Canada	2–0	Singapore
	Report

22 August 1982
10:00

West Germany	2–0	Australia
	Report

23 August 1982
08:00

Kenya	2–3	Canada
	Report

=== Classification round ===
==== Ninth to eleventh place classification ====
Crossover
24 August
New Zealand	7
Singapore	0

Ninth place
25 August
Kenya	1
New Zealand	0

===== Crossover =====
24 August 1982
09:00

New Zealand	7–0	Kenya
	Report

===== Ninth and tenth place =====
25 August 1982
08:00

Kenya	1–0	New Zealand
	Report

==== Fifth to eighth place classification ====
Crossover
24 August
Netherlands	5
Canada	2
24 August
India	4
Spain	1

Fifth place
26 August
Netherlands	2
India	3
Seventh place
26 August
Canada	0
Spain	2

===== Crossover =====
24 August 1982
11:00

Netherlands	5–2	Canada
	Report

24 August 1982
13:00

India	4–1	Spain
	Report

===== Seventh and Eighth place =====
26 August 1982
09:30

Canada	0–2	Spain
	Report

===== Fifth and sixth place =====
26 August 1982
07:45

Netherlands	2–3	India
	Report

==== First to fourth place classification ====
Semi-finals
25 August
Pakistan	1
Australia	4
26 August
West Germany	4
Malaysia	2

Final
28 August
Australia	1
West Germany	4
Third place
27 August
Pakistan	10
Malaysia	0

===== Semi-finals =====
25 August 1982
16:45

West Germany	4–2	Malaysia
	Report

26 August 1982
16:45

Pakistan	1–4	Australia
	Report

===== Third and fourth place =====
27 August 1982
14:45

Pakistan	10–0	Malaysia
	Report

===== Final =====
28 August 1982
16:30

Australia	1–4	West Germany
	Report

== Final standings ==
As per statistical convention in field hockey, matches decided in extra time are counted as wins and losses, while matches decided by penalty shoot-outs are counted as draws.

Pos	Grp	Team	Pld	W	D	L	GF	GA	GD	Pts	Final result
1st place, gold medalist(s)	B	West Germany	7	6	1	0	25	3	+22	13	Gold medal
2nd place, silver medalist(s)	B	Australia	7	4	1	2	21	12	+9	9	Silver medal
3rd place, bronze medalist(s)	A	Pakistan	6	4	1	1	28	10	+18	9	Bronze medal
4	A	Malaysia (H)	6	2	1	3	16	24	−8	5	
5	B	India	7	5	1	1	32	6	+26	11	
6	A	Netherlands	6	3	0	3	19	19	0	6	
7	A	Spain	6	3	0	3	12	16	−4	6	
8	B	Canada	7	2	1	4	15	22	−7	5	
9	B	Kenya	6	2	0	4	5	16	−11	4	
10	A	New Zealand	6	1	0	5	11	15	−4	2	
11	B	Singapore	6	0	0	6	0	41	−41	0	

Source: FIH
(H) Hosts

== See also ==
- 1982 Men's FIH World Cup
