= Juan Manuel Esparis =

Argentine field hockey player

Medal record

Representing Argentina

Men's field hockey

Pan American Games
Gold medal – first place	2003 Santo Domingo	Team

Juan Manuel Esparis (born October 28, 1978) is a field hockey forward from Argentina, who was a member of the Men's National Team that competed at the 2003 Champions Trophy in Amstelveen, Netherlands. He played club hockey for Banco Provincia in Buenos Aires.
