= Spain men's national under-21 field hockey team =

Spain
- Association: Royal Spanish Hockey Federation (Real Federación Española de Hockey)
- Confederation: EHF (Europe)
- Head Coach: Oriol Puig
- Assistant coach(es): Ion Kamio; Daniel Travé
- Manager: Javier Perea
- Captain: Iñaky Zaldua
Home	Away

FIH Hockey Junior World Cup
- Appearances: 13 (first in 1979)
- Best result: (silver) 2nd (2025)

EuroHockey U21 Championship
- Appearances: 21 (first in 1976)
- Best result: (gold) 1st (2000, 2004, 2008, 2024)
Medal record
FIH Hockey Junior World Cup
Silver medal – second place	2025 Tamil Nadu
Bronze medal – third place	2005 Rotterdam
Bronze medal – third place	2023 Kuala Lumpur
EuroHockey U21 Championship
Gold medal – first place	2000 Madrid
Gold medal – first place	2004 Nivelles
Gold medal – first place	2008 San Sebastián
Gold medal – first place	2024 Terrassa
Silver medal – second place	1976 Hamburg
Silver medal – second place	1992 Vughth
Bronze medal – third place	1977 Folkestone
Bronze medal – third place	2002 Lausanne
Bronze medal – third place	2026 Valencia

The Spain men's national under-21 field hockey team represents Spain in men's international under-21 field hockey competitions and is controlled by the Royal Spanish Hockey Federation, the governing body for field hockey in Spain.

The team competes in the EuroHockey U21 Championships and has qualified for all editions of the Junior World Cups except the 1985 edition. Their biggest successes where the bronze medal at the 2005 Junior World Cup and 2023 edition and their four titles at the EuroHockey U21 Championships.

== Tournament record ==
=== FIH Hockey Junior World Cup ===
Year	Host	Position	Pld	W	D	L	GF	GA	Squad
1979	Versailles, France	9th	7	4	0	3	26	15	
1982	Kuala Lumpur, Malaysia	7th	6	3	0	3	12	16	
1985	Vancouver, Canada	Did not participate							
1989	Ipoh, Malaysia	8th	7	2	2	3	5	11	
1993	Terrassa, Spain	7th	7	2	2	3	9	16	
1997	Milton Keynes, England	8th	7	3	1	3	18	15	
2001	Hobart, Australia	5th	8	4	1	3	25	15	
2005	Rotterdam, Netherlands	3rd	8	5	1	2	18	8	
2009	Johor Bahru, Malaysia; Singapore	8th	8	2	1	5	21	21	
2013	New Delhi, India	13th	5	2	0	3	9	11	
2016	Lucknow, India	6th	6	2	1	3	12	11	Squad
2021	Bhubaneswar, India	7th	6	3	2	1	36	8	Squad
2023	Kuala Lumpur, Malaysia	3rd	6	5	0	1	27	9	Squad
2025	Tamil Nadu, India	2nd	6	5	1	0	30	5	Squad
2027	TBD	Qualified							
Total		2nd place	87	42	12	33	248	161	

=== EuroHockey U21 Championship ===
- 1976 – (silver)
- 1977 – (bronze)
- 1978 – 5th place
- 1981 – 4th place
- 1988 – 4th place
- 1992 – (silver)
- 1996 – 4th place
- 1998 – 4th place
- 2000 – (gold)
- 2002 – (bronze)
- 2004 – (gold)
- 2006 – 4th place
- 2008 – (gold)
- 2010 – 6th place
- 2012 – 6th place
- 2014 – 5th place
- 2017 – 4th place
- 2019 – 4th place
- 2022 – 4th place
- 2024 – (gold)
- 2026 – (bronze)

== Current squad ==
The following 18 players were named on 1 July 2024 for the 2024 Men's EuroHockey U21 Championship in Terrassa, Spain from 14 to 20 July 2024.

Caps updated as of 20 July 2024, after the match against the Netherlands.

No.	Pos.	Player	Date of birth (age)	Caps	Club
1	GK	Jan Capellades	24 March 2004 (age 22)	17	(Spain) Club Egara
2		Matías Barón	17 July 2006 (age 20)	11	(Spain) Real Club de Polo
3		Aleix Bozal	29 June 2004 (age 22)	15	(Spain) Junior FC
4		Guiu Corominas	6 June 2004 (age 22)	15	(Spain) Atlètic Terrassa
5		Iñaki Zaldúa (Captain)	26 February 2003 (age 23)	20	(Spain) Real Club de Polo
6		Antón Serrahima	14 January 2003 (age 23)	5	(Spain) Junior FC
8		Pere Amat	17 September 2004 (age 22)	20	(Spain) Club Egara
9		Pol Cabré-Verdiell	22 April 2003 (age 23)	26	(Spain) Atlètic Terrassa
10		Pau Petchame	21 January 2003 (age 23)	20	(Spain) CD Terrassa
11		Pablo Roman	3 July 2004 (age 22)	5	(Spain) Complutense
12		Ton Moran	11 January 2006 (age 20)	11	(Spain) Club Egara
14		Nicolas Álvarez	4 January 2003 (age 23)	15	(Spain) RS Tenis
17		Mario Mena	27 April 2005 (age 21)	5	(Spain) CD Terrassa
19		Pablo Espino	28 March 2003 (age 23)	15	(Spain) Junior FC
21		Ton Borras	10 October 2003 (age 23)	20	(Spain) Real Club de Polo
22		Xavier Barutell	5 June 2003 (age 23)	26	(Spain) Atlètic Terrassa
23		Bruno Ávila	21 January 2004 (age 22)	5	(Spain) Club Egara
25	GK	Diego Palomero	22 January 2005 (age 21)	0	(Spain) Club de Campo

=== Recent call-ups ===
The following players have also been called up to the squad within the last twelve months.

Pos.	Player	Date of birth (age)	Caps	Club	Latest call-up
	Oriol Bozal	10 July 2002 (age 24)	21	(Spain) Junior FC	2023 FIH Hockey Junior World Cup
	Bruno Font	15 November 2004 (age 21)	15	(Spain) Junior FC	2023 FIH Hockey Junior World Cup
	Enric Miralles	8 June 2002 (age 24)	15	(Spain) CD Terrassa	2023 FIH Hockey Junior World Cup
	Andreas Rafi	24 April 2002 (age 24)	15	(Spain) Barcelona	2023 FIH Hockey Junior World Cup
GK	Fernando Díaz	20 February 2002 (age 24)	6	(Spain) Complutense	2023 FIH Hockey Junior World Cup

== See also ==
- Spain men's national field hockey team
- Spain women's national under-21 field hockey team
