= Marvin Harper =

South African field hockey player

Marvin Harper (born 1 November 1985) is a South African field hockey player who competed in the 2008 Summer Olympics and 2012 Summer Olympics.
