= Netherlands men's national under-21 field hockey team =

Netherlands
- Nickname(s): Jong Oranje Heren (Young Orange Men)
- Association: Royal Dutch Hockey Federation (Koninklijke Nederlandse Hockey Bond)
- Confederation: EHF (Europe)
- Head Coach: Jesse Mahieu
- Assistant coach(es): Tim Oudenaller
- Manager: Thijs de Greeff
- Captain: Silas Lageman
Home	Away

Junior World Cup
- Appearances: 14 (first in 1979)
- Best result: (silver) 2nd (1985, 2009)

EuroHockey Junior Championship
- Appearances: 22 (first in 1976)
- Best result: (gold) 1st (1976, 1978, 1992, 1996, 2002, 2006, 2010, 2014, 2017, 2022, 2026)
Medal record
Junior World Cup
Silver medal – second place	1985 Vancouver
Silver medal – second place	2009 Johor Bahru-Singapore
Bronze medal – third place	1979 Versailles
Bronze medal – third place	2013 New Delhi
EuroHockey Junior Championship
Gold medal – first place	1976 Hamburg
Gold medal – first place	1978 Dublin
Gold medal – first place	1992 Vught
Gold medal – first place	1996 Vejle
Gold medal – first place	2002 Lausanne
Gold medal – first place	2006 Prague
Gold medal – first place	2010 Siemianowice Śląskie
Gold medal – first place	2014 Waterloo
Gold medal – first place	2017 Valencia
Gold medal – first place	2022 Ghent
Gold medal – first place	2026 Valencia
Silver medal – second place	1977 Folkestone
Silver medal – second place	1984 Rome
Silver medal – second place	2008 San Sebastián
Silver medal – second place	2012 's-Hertogenbosch
Silver medal – second place	2024 Terrassa
Bronze medal – third place	1981 Barcelona
Bronze medal – third place	1988 Santander
Bronze medal – third place	1998 Poznań
Bronze medal – third place	2000 Madrid
Bronze medal – third place	2004 Nivelles
Bronze medal – third place	2019 Valencia

The Netherlands men's national under-21 field hockey team represents the Netherlands in men's international under-21 field hockey and is controlled by the Koninklijke Nederlandse Hockey Bond, the governing body for field hockey in the Netherlands.

The team competes in the Men's EuroHockey Junior Championships which they have won a record eleven times. They have also appeared in all Junior World Cups where their best result is winning the silver medal in 1985 and 2009.

== Tournament record ==
=== Junior World Cup ===
- 1979 – (bronze)
- 1982 – 6th place
- 1985 – (silver)
- 1989 – 9th place
- 1993 – 4th place
- 1997 – 7th place
- 2001 – 8th place
- 2005 – 5th place
- 2009 – (silver)
- 2013 – (bronze)
- 2016 – 7th place
- 2021 – 5th place
- 2023 – 5th place
- 2025 – 6th place
- 2027 – Qualified

=== EuroHockey Junior Championship ===
- 1976 – (gold)
- 1977 – (silver)
- 1978 – (gold)
- 1981 – (bronze)
- 1984 – (silver)
- 1988 – (bronze)
- 1992 – (gold)
- 1996 – (gold)
- 1998 – (bronze)
- 2000 – (bronze)
- 2002 – (gold)
- 2004 – (bronze)
- 2006 – (gold)
- 2008 – (silver)
- 2010 – (gold)
- 2012 – (silver)
- 2014 – (gold)
- 2017 – (gold)
- 2019 – (bronze)
- 2022 – (gold)
- 2024 – (silver)
- 2026 – (gold)

== Players ==
=== Current squad ===
The following 20 players were named on 4 November 2025 for the 2025 Men's FIH Hockey Junior World Cup in Tamil Nadu, India from 28 November to 10 December 2025.

Caps updated as of 20 July 2024, after the match against Spain.

No.	Pos.	Player	Date of birth (age)	Caps	Club
1	GK	Nieki Verbeek	7 October 2004 (age 22)	7	(Netherlands) Oranje-Rood
2	GK	Olivier Paalman	30 June 2006 (age 20)	0	(Netherlands) Amsterdam
5		Peppe Veen	11 December 2005 (age 20)	0	(Netherlands) Schaerweijde
6		Tjeerd Boermans	1 October 2004 (age 22)	0	(Netherlands) Amsterdam
7		Danilo Trieling	22 February 2004 (age 22)	5	(Netherlands) SCHC
8		Thies Bakker	22 January 2005 (age 21)	5	(Netherlands) Kampong
9		Finn van Bijnen	24 May 2004 (age 22)	5	(Netherlands) Kampong
10	DF	Gijs ter Braak	22 September 2004 (age 22)	11	(Netherlands) Bloemendaal
11	MF	Merijn Maas	15 December 2004 (age 21)	0	(Netherlands) HDM
12		Jens de Vuijst	12 June 2004 (age 22)	3	(Netherlands) Kampong
13		Joppe Wolbert	14 May 2005 (age 21)	10	(Netherlands) Den Bosch
14	FW	Jan van 't Land	7 April 2005 (age 21)	11	(Netherlands) Bloemendaal
15		Teun Hogenhout	19 February 2008 (age 18)	0	(Netherlands) Bloemendaal
16	MF	Pepijn van der Valk	9 June 2006 (age 20)	18	(Netherlands) Pinoké
17		Tim Knapper	22 August 2006 (age 20)	5	(Netherlands) Pinoké
18		Pepijn Jones	26 March 2006 (age 20)	0	(Netherlands) Klein Zwitserland
19		Lucas Corstens	14 May 2007 (age 19)	0	(Netherlands) Amsterdam
21		Kjell Plantenga	19 June 2004 (age 22)	0	(Netherlands) Kampong
22	FW	Casper van der Veen (Captain)	29 June 2004 (age 22)	22	(Netherlands) Bloemendaal
25		Casper Hafkamp	30 May 2004 (age 22)	0	(Netherlands) SCHC

== See also ==
- Netherlands men's national field hockey team
- Netherlands women's national under-21 field hockey team
