= 2008 Men's EuroHockey Junior Championship =

Hockey tournament

Tournament details
- Host country: Spain
- City: San Sebastián
- Dates: 20–26 July
- Teams: 8 (from 1 confederation)
- Venue(s): Atlético San Sebastián

Final positions
- Champions: Spain (3rd title)
- Runner-up: Netherlands
- Third place: Germany

Tournament statistics
- Matches played: 20
- Goals scored: 134 (6.7 per match)

The 2008 Men's EuroHockey Junior Championship was the 14th edition of the men's EuroHockey Junior Championship. It was held in San Sebastián, Spain from 20 to 26 July 2008.

The hosts Spain won the tournament for the third time after they defeated the defending champions the Netherlands 1–0 in the final. Germany won the bronze medal after defeating Belgium 4–3 in the third-place playoff.

The tournament also served as a qualifier for the 2009 Junior World Cup in Malaysia and Singapore. Teams from Spain, the Netherlands, Germany, Belgium, England and Poland all qualified.

== Participating nations ==
Alongside the host nation, 7 teams competed in the tournament.

- Austria
- Belgium
- England
- Germany
- Netherlands
- Poland
- Scotland
- Spain

== Results ==
=== Preliminary round ===
==== Pool A ====
Pos	Team	Pld	W	D	L	GF	GA	GD	Pts	Qualification
1	Netherlands	3	3	0	0	31	5	+26	9	Semi-finals
2	Spain (H)	3	2	0	1	9	9	0	6	Semi-finals
3	England	3	1	0	2	10	11	−1	3	
4	Austria	3	0	0	3	3	28	−25	0	

Source: England Hockey
Rules for classification: 1) points; 2) goal difference; 3) goals scored; 4) head-to-head result.
(H) Hosts

20 July 2008
17:00

Netherlands	15–0	Austria
	Report

Umpires:
Lionel van Lidth de Jude (BEL)
David Sweetman (SCO)

20 July 2008
19:15

Spain	1–0	England
Dabanch 68'	Report

Umpires:
Warren McCully (IRE)
Bjorn Bachmann (GER)

22 July 2008
17:00

Netherlands	9–2	England
Kempermann 1'; Vermeulen 3', 17', 60'; Campbell 20', 21'; De Voogd 28', 32', 59'	Report	Edwards 23'; Smith 56'

Umpires:
Lionel van Lidth de Jude (BEL)
David Sweetman (SCO)

22 July 2008
19:15

Spain	5–2	Austria
	Report

Umpires:
Krzystof Cholewa (POL)
Will Drury (WAL)

23 July 2008
17:00

England	8–1	Austria
Smith 6', 51', 61'; Catlin 8'; Brogdon 25'; Dobson 48'; Beckett 53', 54'	Report	Gero 24'

Umpires:
Krzystof Cholewa (POL)
David Sweetman (SCO)

23 July 2008
19:15

Netherlands	7–3	Spain
	Report

Umpires:
Warren McCully (IRE)
Bjorn Bachmann (GER)

==== Pool B ====
Pos	Team	Pld	W	D	L	GF	GA	GD	Pts	Qualification
1	Germany	3	2	1	0	17	5	+12	7	Semi-finals
2	Belgium	3	1	1	1	8	12	−4	4	Semi-finals
3	Poland	3	1	0	2	7	14	−7	3	
4	Scotland	3	0	2	1	6	7	−1	2	

Source: England Hockey
Rules for classification: 1) points; 2) goal difference; 3) goals scored; 4) head-to-head result.

20 July 2008
10:00

Germany	2–2	Scotland
Stralkowski 55'; Wesley 65'	Report	Cairns 16', 23'

Umpires:
Michael Eilmer (AUT)
Dan Barstow (ENG)

20 July 2008
12:15

Belgium	4–3	Poland
	Report

Umpires:
Will Drury (WAL)
Diego Estébanez (ESP)

21 July 2008
17:00

Germany	8–1	Poland
Stralkowski 18', 27'; Lietz 20', 57'; Wesley 45'; Rabente 51'; Fürk 65'; Otto 68'	Report	Kozlowski 3'

Umpires:
Michael Eilmer (AUT)
Dan Barstow (ENG)

21 July 2008
19:15

Belgium	2–2	Scotland
	Report

Umpires:
Gijs Hofman (NED)
Diego Estébanez (ESP)

23 July 2008
10:00

Poland	3–2	Scotland
	Report

Umpires:
Michael Eilmer (AUT)
Gijs Hofman (NED)

23 July 2008
12:15

Germany	7–2	Belgium
Stralkowski 19', 21', 54'; Fürk 31'; Wesley 52'; Wösch 62'; Oldhafer 65'	Report	33', 56'

Umpires:
Will Drury (WAL)
Dan Barstow (ENG)

=== Fifth to eighth place classification ===
==== Pool C ====
Pos	Team	Pld	W	D	L	GF	GA	GD	Pts	Relegation
1	England	3	3	0	0	16	3	+13	9	
2	Poland	3	2	0	1	7	10	−3	6	
3	Scotland	3	1	0	2	8	7	+1	3	Relegation to Junior Championship II
4	Austria	3	0	0	3	5	16	−11	0	Relegation to Junior Championship II

Source: England Hockey
Rules for classification: 1) points; 2) goal difference; 3) goals scored; 4) head-to-head result.

25 July 2008
10:00

Austria	2–3	Poland
	Report

Umpires:
Lionel van Lidth de Jude (BEL)
Dan Barstow (ENG)

25 July 2008
12:15

England	2–1	Scotland
Kinder 24'; Smith 64'	Report	Cairns 66'

Umpires:
Gijs Hofman (NED)
Krzysztof Cholewa (POL)

26 July 2008
10:00

Austria	2–5	Scotland
	Report

Umpires:
Lionel van Lidth de Jude (BEL)
Krzysztof Cholewa (POL)

25 July 2008
12:15

England	6–1	Poland
Dobson 3'; Osborn 5'; Kinder 46'; Griffiths 49'; Smith 63'; Gregg 70'	Report	Makowski 19'

Umpires:
Gijs Hofman (NED)
Michael Eilmer (AUT)

=== First to fourth place classification ===
Semi-finals
25 July 2008
Netherlands	4
Belgium	3
25 July 2008
Germany	2
Spain	4

Final
26 July 2008
Netherlands	0
Spain (a.e.t)	1
Third place
26 July 2008
Belgium	3
Germany	4

==== Semi-finals ====
25 July 2008
17:00

Germany	2–4	Spain
Grell 63'; Stralkowski 66'	Report	Dabanch 21'; Padrós 33'; Salles 59'; Guerrero 70'

Umpires:
Warren McCully (IRE)
David Sweetman (SCO)

25 July 2008
19:30

Netherlands	4–3	Belgium
	Report

Umpires:
Diego Estébanez (ESP)
Bjorn Bachmann (GER)

==== Third and fourth place ====
26 July 2008
16:30

Belgium	3–4	Germany
	Report

Umpires:
Will Drury (WAL)
Diego Estébanez (ESP)

==== Final ====
26 July 2008
19:00

Netherlands	0–1 (a.e.t.)	Spain
	Report

Umpires:
Warren McCully (IRE)
Bjorn Bachmann (GER)

== Statistics ==
=== Final standings ===
As per statistical convention in field hockey, matches decided in extra time are counted as wins and losses, while matches decided by penalty shoot-outs are counted as draws.

Pos	Team	Pld	W	D	L	GF	GA	GD	Pts	Final Standings
1st place, gold medalist(s)	Spain	5	4	0	1	14	11	+3	12	Gold Medal
2nd place, silver medalist(s)	Netherlands	5	4	0	1	35	9	+26	12	Silver Medal
3rd place, bronze medalist(s)	Germany	5	3	1	1	23	12	+11	10	Bronze Medal
4	Belgium	5	1	1	3	14	20	−6	4	Fourth place
5	England	5	3	0	2	18	13	+5	9	Eliminated in pool stage
6	Poland	5	2	0	3	11	22	−11	6	Eliminated in pool stage
7	Scotland	5	1	2	2	12	11	+1	5	Eliminated in pool stage
8	Austria	5	0	0	5	7	36	−29	0	Eliminated in pool stage

Source: England Hockey
