= Andrew Sewnauth =

Scottish field hockey player

Andrew Sewnauth (/ˈsjuːnɔːθ/; born 26 February 1982 in Glasgow) is a Scottish field hockey player, who was a member of the national squad that finished 8th in the 2003 European Nations Cup in Barcelona and won the 2003 Celtic Cup. The defender plays for Western Wildcats, and has won six Scottish National League titles.

He is the current captain of Western Wildcats.
