= 1997 Men's Hockey Junior World Cup =

6th edition of the Men's Hockey Junior World Cup

1997 Men's Junior World Cup
Tournament details
- Host country: England
- City: Milton Keynes
- Dates: 17–28 September
- Teams: 12 (from 5 confederations)
- Venue: National Hockey Stadium

Final positions
- Champions: Australia (1st title)
- Runner-up: India
- Third place: Germany

Tournament statistics
- Top scorer: (Japan) Naohiko Tobita (10 goals)
- Best player: (Spain) Pol Amat

The 1997 Men's Hockey Junior World Cup was the sixth edition of the Hockey Junior World Cup, the quadrennial world championship for men's national under-21 national field hockey teams organized by the International Hockey Federation. It was held from 17 to 28 September 1997 in Milton Keynes, England.

Australia won the tournament for the first time by defeating India 3–2 in the final. Germany won the bronze medal by defeating England 4–2 in the third and fourth place playoff.

== Qualification ==
Dates	Event	Location	Quotas	Qualifier(s)
Host			1	England
1–7 September 1996	1996 EuroHockey Junior Championship	Vejle, Denmark	4	Netherlands; Germany; Spain; Belgium
29 May – 9 June 1996	1996 Junior Asia Cup	Singapore	2	Pakistan; India
30 October – 9 November 1996	1996 Pan American Junior Championship	Bridgetown, Barbados	2	Argentina; Cuba
23–26 April 1997	1997 Junior African Cup	Harare, Zimbabwe	1	Egypt
Oceania			1	Australia
26–29 March 1997	Intercontinental qualification	Moorpark, United States	1	Japan
Total			12	

== Results ==
All times are Central European Summer Time (UTC+02:00)

=== Preliminary round ===
==== Pool A ====
Pos	Team	Pld	W	D	L	GF	GA	GD	Pts	Qualification
1	Australia	5	3	2	0	18	6	+12	8	Advanced to Semi-finals
2	India	5	3	1	1	19	9	+10	7	Advanced to Semi-finals
3	Spain	5	3	1	1	14	7	+7	7	
4	Netherlands	5	2	1	2	13	11	+2	5	
5	Belgium	5	1	1	3	8	13	−5	3	
6	Cuba	5	0	0	5	5	31	−26	0	

Source: Field Hockey
Rules for classification: 1) points; 2) games won; 3) goal difference; 4) goals scored; 5) head-to-head result.

17 September 1997
18:00

Australia	8–2	Cuba
Choppy 3'; Commens 8', 23'; Taylor 26'; Bolton 42', 44'; Brennan 56'; Elder 60'	Report	Y. Hernández 14'; Gómez 67'

Umpires:
Toshimichi Fujimura (JPN)
Hamish Jamson (ENG)

18 September 1997
12:00

Spain	3–2	India
Amat 26', 42', 50'	Report	Rajiv 43', 54'

Umpires:
Richard Wolter (GER)
Peter Broughton (ENG)

18 September 1997
14:00

Belgium	2–2	Netherlands
Letier 23'; Collin 27'	Report	Van Wijk 15'; Slotema 55'

Umpires:
Jason McCracken (NZL)
Ermanno Silvano (ITA)

19 September 1997
14:00

Cuba	1–6	Spain
Gómez 59'	Report	J. Sánchez 5'; Aguilar 10'; Amat 21', 41'; Masaña 50'; Casas 66'

Umpires:
Peter Broughton (ENG)
Toshimichi Fujimura (JPN)

19 September 1997
16:00

Australia	3–1	Belgium
Elder 43'; Wells 59'; Taylor 62'	Report	Fayt 42'

Umpires:
Steven Graham (WAL)
Ermanno Silvano (ITA)

19 September 1997
18:00

Netherlands	2–3	India
De Jong 7'; Van Esseveldt 18'	Report	Tirkey 32'; Rajiv 62'; Rawat 68'

Umpires:
Richard Wolter (GER)
Hamish Jamson (ENG)

21 September 1997
12:00

Belgium	1–0	Cuba
Gierts 40'	Report

Umpires:
Peter Broughton (ENG)
Roger St. Rose (TTO)

21 September 1997
14:00

India	2–2	Australia
Virender 23'; Rajiv 29'	Report	Wells 37'; Elder 58'

Umpires:
Richard Wolter (GER)
Jason McCracken (NZL)

21 September 1997
16:00

Spain	0–1	Netherlands
	Report	De Jong 49'

Umpires:
Toshimichi Fujimura (JPN)
Hamish Jamson (ENG)

22 September 1997
18:00

Cuba	0–8	India
	Report	Tirkey 38', 43'; Rajiv 41', 50', 64'; Senthil 55'; Baljit 62'; Chauhan 70'

Umpires:
Richard Wolter (GER)
Ermanno Silvano (ITA)

23 September 1997
12:00

Netherlands	0–4	Australia
	Report	Webster 15'; Wells 31'; Taylor 51'; Bolton 54'

Umpires:
Peter Broughton (ENG)
Richard Wolter (GER)

23 September 1997
14:00

Spain	4–2	Belgium
Quintana 35', 57'; Aguilar 40', 60'	Report	Gierts 12'; Milecan 55'

Umpires:
Toshimichi Fujimura (JPN)
Steven Graham (WAL)

24 September 1997
10:00

Netherlands	8–2	Cuba
Froger (1 goal); Hoyng (3 goals); De Jong (2 goals); Jorn van 't Land (2 goals)	Report	Lerrondo (2 goals)

Umpires:
Hamish Jamson (ENG)
Peter Broughton (ENG)

24 September 1997
12:00

Australia	1–1	Spain
Taylor 28'	Report	Amat 2'

Umpires:
Ermanno Silvano (ITA)
Jason McCracken (NZL)

24 September 1997
14:00

India	4–2	Belgium
Samir 30', 50'; Rajiv 34'; Chauhan 54'	Report	Gierts 16'; Milecan 68'

Umpires:
Toshimichi Fijimura (JPN)
Steven Graham (WAL)

==== Pool B ====
Pos	Team	Pld	W	D	L	GF	GA	GD	Pts	Qualification
1	Germany	5	4	0	1	15	9	+6	8	Advanced to Semi-finals
2	England (H)	5	3	0	2	12	10	+2	6	Advanced to Semi-finals
3	Pakistan	5	2	2	1	16	10	+6	6	
4	Argentina	5	2	2	1	12	12	0	6	
5	Japan	5	1	0	4	8	14	−6	2	
6	Egypt	5	0	2	3	7	15	−8	2	

Source: Field Hockey
Rules for classification: 1) points; 2) games won; 3) goal difference; 4) goals scored; 5) head-to-head result.
(H) Hosts

17 September 1997
11:30

Pakistan	1–1	Egypt
Ullah 58'	Report	El Fatah 67'

Umpires:
Xavier Adell (ESP)
Steven Graham (WAL)

17 September 1997
13:30

England	3–2	Japan
Pearn 20', 29', 63'	Report	Tobita 46'; Yamazaki 64'

Umpires:
Shakeel Qureshi (IND)
Ermanno Silvano (ITA)

17 September 1997
16:00

Argentina	1–5	Germany
Ocaña 58'	Report	Lunau-Mierke 25'; Reinelt 46', 55'; Achtmann 64'; Draguhn 68'

Umpires:
Peter Elders (NED)
Eric Denis (BEL)

18 September 1997
16:00

Egypt	1–4	England
Samer 53'	Report	Boyse 14'; Mathews 37', 50'; Simons 63'

Umpires:
Eric Denis (BEL)
Shakeel Qureshi (IND)

18 September 1997
18:00

Pakistan	3–3	Argentina
Farooq 2'; Abdullah 34', 43'	Report	Deambosi 7', 70'; Ocaña 11'

Umpires:
Roger St. Rose (TTO)
Xavier Adell (ESP)

19 September 1997
12:00

Germany	3–1	Japan
Reinelt 35'; Lunau-Mierke 48', 60'	Report	Soma 32'

Umpires:
Jason McCracken (NZL)
Peter Elders (NED)

20 September 1997
12:00

Egypt	2–2	Argentina
Mendour 25'; El Said 32'	Report	Garreta 8'; Melgarejo 63'

Umpires:
Peter Elders (NED)
Roger St. Rose (TTO)

20 September 1997
14:00

England	0–1	Germany
	Report	Draguhn 18'

Umpires:
Eric Denis (BEL)
Shakeel Qureshi (IND)

20 September 1997
16:00

Japan	1–5	Pakistan
Tobita 33'	Report	Abdullah 3'; Imran 5'; Yousaf 41'; Salim 50'; Khalid Jr. 57'

Umpires:
Steven Graham (WAL)
Xavier Adell (ESP)

22 September 1997
12:00

Japan	4–2	Egypt
Tobita 14', 30', 57'; Hokaze 18'	Report	Wasfy 10'; Abbas 17'

Umpires:
Roger St. Rose (TTO)
Shakeel Qureshi (IND)

22 September 1997
14:00

Germany	2–6	Pakistan
Bruse 38'; Draguhn 55'	Report	Yousaf 4', 9', 44'; Ullah 11', 47'; Farooq 67'

Umpires:
Steven Graham (WAL)
Eric Denis (BEL)

22 September 1997
16:00

England	2–5	Argentina
Mathews 19'; Boyse 22'	Report	Deambosi 17', 44'; M. Vila 33'; Orozco 48'; Melgarejo 63'

Umpires:
Xavier Adell (ESP)
Peter Elders (NED)

23 September 1997
16:00

Argentina	1–0	Japan
Melgarejo 44'	Report

Umpires:
Roger St. Rose (TTO)
Eric Denis (BEL)

23 September 1997
18:00

Pakistan	1–3	England
Ullah 31'	Report	Simons 12', 12'; Pearn 27'

Umpires:
Peter Elders (NED)
Xavier Adell (ESP)

24 September 1997
16:00

Germany	4–1	Egypt
Draughn 5'; Achtmann 17'; Lunau-Mierke 27'; Hentschel 37'	Report	Hassan 42'

Umpires:
Shakeel Qureshi (IND)
Roger St. Rose (TTO)

=== Ninth to twelfth place classification ===
Cross-overs
27 September
Belgium	2
Egypt	4
27 September
Japan	4
Cuba (a.e.t.)	5

Ninth place
28 September
Egypt	5
Cuba	3
Eleventh place
28 September
Belgium	3
Japan	5

==== Cross-overs ====
27 September 1997
10:00

Belgium	2–4	Egypt
Milecan 1'; Collin 51'	Report	Samer 29', 32'; Wasfy 49'; Hassan 53'

Umpires:
Peter Elders (NED)
Ermanno Silvano (ITA)

27 September 1997
12:30

Japan	4–5 (a.e.t.)	Cuba
Tobita 24', 37', 46', 65'	Report	Gómez 22', 57', 72'; J. Hernández 45', 68'

Umpires:
Roger St. Rose (TTO)
Shakeel Qureshi (IND)

==== Eleventh and twelfth place ====
28 September 1997
08:00

Belgium	3–5	Japan
Letier 10'; Collin 37'; Gierts 42'	Report	Shirakaba 9'; Yamazaki 11', 16', 32'; Tobita 33'

Umpires:
Ermanno Silvano (ITA)
Roger St. Rose (TTO)

==== Ninth and tenth place ====
28 September 1997
10:30

Egypt	3–2 (a.e.t.)	Cuba
Samer 8'; Wasfy 60'; El Fatah 76'	Report	Y. Pérez 31'; Gómez 58'

Umpires:
Shakeel Qureshi (IND)
Eric Denis (BEL)

=== Fifth to eighth place classification ===
Cross-overs
26 September
Spain	0
Argentina	3
26 September
Pakistan	5
Netherlands	2

Fifth place
27 September
Argentina	2
Pakistan	4
Seventh place
27 September
Spain	4
Netherlands	5

==== Cross-overs ====
26 September 1997
10:00

Spain	0–3	Argentina
	Report	Deambrosi 22'; M. Vila 37'; Orozco 47'

Umpires:
Hamish Jamson (ENG)
Jason McCracken (NZL)

26 September 1997
12:30

Pakistan	5–2	Netherlands
Farooq 6', 57'; Atzal 27'; Ullah 49', 54'	Report	De Jong 46'; Meuwsen 69'

Umpires:
Peter Broughton (ENG)
Toshimichi Fujimura (JPN)

==== Seventh and eighth place ====
27 September 1997
17:30

Spain	4–5	Netherlands
Amat 10', 36'; Quintana 20'; J. Sánchez 26'	Report	Van Esseveldt 4'; De Jong 25'; Hoyng 39'; Derichx 44'; Van der Weide 70+'

Umpires:
Jason McCracken (NZL)
Peter Broughton (ENG)

==== Fifth and sixth place ====
27 September 1997
15:00

Argentina	2–4	Pakistan
Esparis 18'; Garreta 27'	Report	Yousuf 9', 62'; Abdullah 42', 49'

Umpires:
Hamish Jamson (ENG)
Steven Graham (WAL)

=== First to fourth place classification ===
Semi-finals
26 September
Australia	2
England	1
26 September
Germany	3
India (a.e.t.)	4

Final
28 September
Australia	3
India	2
Third place
28 September
England	2
Germany	4

==== Semi-finals ====
26 September 1997
15:00

Germany	3–4 (a.e.t.)	India
Bruse 5'; Reinelt 31'; Klink 58'	Report	Baljit 38'; Harbhajan 43'; Virender 68'; Rajiv 74'

Umpires:
Steven Graham (WAL)
Eric Denis (BEL)

26 September 1997
17:30

Australia	2–1	England
Taylor 58'; Elder 63'	Report	Simons 8'

Umpires:
Richard Wolter (GER)
Xavier Adell (ESP)

==== Third and fourth place ====
28 September 1997
13:00

England	2–4	Germany
Simons 48'; Boyse 66'	Report	Reinelt 4'; Klink 16'; Eimer 25'; Lunau-Mierke 38'

Umpires:
Peter Elders (NED)
Toshimichi Fujimura (JPN)

==== Final ====
28 September 1997
16:00

Australia	3–2	India
Taylor 29'; Elder 33'; Wells 42'	Report	Harbhajan 17'; Gurmail 55'

Umpires:
Xavier Adell (ESP)
Richard Wolter (GER)

== Statistics ==
=== Final standings ===
As per statistical convention in field hockey, matches decided in extra time are counted as wins and losses, while matches decided by penalty shoot-outs are counted as draws.

Pos	Team	Pld	W	D	L	GF	GA	GD	Pts	Final Standings
1st place, gold medalist(s)	Australia	7	5	2	0	23	9	+14	17	Gold Medal
2nd place, silver medalist(s)	India	7	4	1	2	25	15	+10	13	Silver Medal
3rd place, bronze medalist(s)	Germany	7	5	0	2	22	15	+7	15	Bronze Medal
4	England (H)	7	3	0	4	15	16	−1	9	Fourth place
5	Pakistan	7	4	2	1	25	14	+11	14	Eliminated in Group stage
6	Argentina	7	3	2	2	17	16	+1	11	Eliminated in Group stage
7	Netherlands	7	3	1	3	20	20	0	10	Eliminated in Group stage
8	Spain	7	3	1	3	18	15	+3	10	Eliminated in Group stage
9	Egypt	7	2	2	3	14	19	−5	8	Eliminated in Group stage
10	Cuba	7	1	0	6	12	38	−26	3	Eliminated in Group stage
11	Japan	7	2	0	5	17	22	−5	6	Eliminated in Group stage
12	Belgium	7	1	1	5	13	22	−9	4	Eliminated in Group stage

Source: Field Hockey
(H) Hosts

=== Goalscorers ===
There were 221 goals scored in 42 matches, for an average of 5.26 goals per match.

10 goals

- (Japan) Naohiko Tobita

9 goals

- (India) Rajiv Mishra

8 goals

- (Spain) Pol Amat

6 goals

- (Australia) Benjamin Taylor
- (Cuba) Heriberto Gómez
- (Netherlands) Mark de Jong
- (Pakistan) Zakir Ullah
- (Pakistan) Imran Yousaf

5 goals

- (Argentina) Leonardi Deambosi
- (Australia) Troy Elder
- (England) Adrian Simons
- (Germany) Patrick Lunau-Mierke
- (Germany) Sascha Reinelt
- (Pakistan) Baber Abdullah

4 goals

- (Australia) Matthew Wells
- (Belgium) Patrick Gierts
- (Egypt) Mahmoud Samer
- (England) Mark Pearn
- (Germany) Thomas Draughn
- (Japan) Kazuya Yamazaki
- (Netherlands) Timme Hoyng
- (Pakistan) Muhammad Farooq

3 goals

- (Argentina) Leandro Melgarejo
- (Australia) Guy Bolton
- (Belgium) Jean Collin
- (Belgium) Christophe Milecan
- (Egypt) Ahmed Wasfy
- (England) Alistair Boyse
- (England) David Mathews
- (India) Dilip Tirkey
- (Spain) Eduardo Aguilar
- (Spain) Jordi Quintana

2 goals

- (Argentina) Gabriel Garreta
- (Argentina) Michel Ocaña
- (Argentina) Germán Orozco
- (Argentina) Matías Vila
- (Australia) Adam Commens
- (Belgium) Alexandre Letier
- (Cuba) Jorge Hernández
- (Cuba) Yuani Lerrondo
- (Egypt) Amro El Fateh
- (Egypt) Ahmed Hassan
- (Germany) Christian Achtmann
- (Germany) Dirk Bruse
- (Germany) Maximilien Klink
- (India) Rajesh Chauhan
- (India) Samir Dad
- (India) Harbhajan Singh
- (India) Virender Singh
- (India) Baljit Singh Saini
- (Netherlands) Jan Jorn van 't Land
- (Netherlands) Paul van Esseveldt
- (Spain) Josep Sánchez

1 goal

- (Argentina) Juan Manuel Esparis
- (Australia) Scott Brennan
- (Australia) Baeden Choppy
- (Australia) Scott Webster
- (Belgium) Renaud Fayt
- (Cuba) Yoandi Blanco Hernández
- (Cuba) Yuri Pérez
- (Egypt) Ahmed Abbas
- (Egypt) Ahmed Mendour
- (Egypt) Adnan El Said
- (Germany) Christoph Eimer
- (Germany) Tobias Hentschel
- (India) Senthil Ramu
- (India) Y. S. Rawat
- (India) Gurmail Singh
- (Japan) Daisuke Hokaze
- (Japan) Katsuhiko Soma
- (Japan) Yukihiro Shirakaba
- (Netherlands) Harm Derichx
- (Netherlands) Martin Froger
- (Netherlands) David Meuwsen
- (Netherlands) Remco Slotema
- (Netherlands) Marc van Wijk
- (Netherlands) Sander van de Weide
- (Pakistan) Zahid Aztal
- (Pakistan) Ejaz Imran
- (Pakistan) Hameed Khalid Junior
- (Pakistan) Amir Salim
- (Spain) Jordi Casas
- (Spain) Agustín Masaña
