= 1979 Men's Hockey Junior World Cup =

Junior hockey tournament

1979 FIH Hockey Junior World Cup
Tournament details
- Host country: France
- City: Versailles
- Dates: 23 August - 2 September
- Teams: 12 (from 4 confederations)
- Venue: Racing Club de France

Final positions
- Champions: Pakistan (1st title)
- Runner-up: West Germany
- Third place: Netherlands

Tournament statistics
- Matches played: 42
- Goals scored: 192 (4.57 per match)
- Best player: (Pakistan) Manzoor Hussain

The 1979 Hockey Junior World Cup was the first edition of the Hockey Junior World Cup organized by FIH for national teams of players under the age of 21. The tournament was hosted in Versailles, France from 23 August to 2 September 1979. Pakistan won the inaugural tournament defeating West Germany 2–0 in the final where, Malik Nasir Khan was awarded with the Golden Stick title

== Background ==
The International Hockey Federation was looking to expand the global exposure of the game through introducing new competitions under its own organization. The Junior Hockey World Cup was introduced six months after the introduction of the Hockey Champions Trophy. France hosted the first tournament and the trophy was called the Roger Danet Challenge Cup named after the President of FIH Roger Alain Danet.

== Teams ==
The following twelve teams participated in the tournament on invitational basis.

Confederation	Team(s)
Asia	India Malaysia Pakistan Singapore
Africa	Ghana
Americas	Argentina Chile
Europe	France (hosts) Ireland Netherlands Spain West Germany

== Preliminary round ==
=== Pool A ===
Pos	Team	Pld	W	D	L	GF	GA	GD	Pts	Qualification
1	Netherlands	5	4	0	1	13	4	+9	8	Semi-finals
2	Malaysia	5	4	0	1	8	3	+5	8	Semi-finals
3	India	5	3	0	2	16	8	+8	6	
4	Spain	5	2	0	3	11	11	0	4	
5	France (H)	5	2	0	3	6	10	−4	4	
6	Chile	5	0	0	5	4	22	−18	0	

Source: FIH
(H) Hosts

23 August 1979
10:00

Malaysia	2–1	India

23 August 1979
12:00

France	3–1	Chile

23 August 1979
18:00

Netherlands	3–1	Spain

24 August 1979
10:00

Netherlands	4–1	France

24 August 1979
12:00

Malaysia	2–0	Spain

24 August 1979
14:00

India	7–1	Chile

26 August 1979
10:00

Spain	4–3	India

26 August 1979
12:00

Netherlands	4–0	Chile

26 August 1979
14:00

France	0–1	Malaysia

28 August 1979
10:00

Netherlands	2–1	Malaysia

28 August 1979
12:00

France	1–4	India

28 August 1979
14:00

Chile	2–6	Spain

30 August 1979
10:00

Malaysia	2–0	Chile

30 August 1979
12:00

India	1–0	Netherlands

30 August 1979
14:00

Spain	0–1	France

=== Pool B ===
Pos	Team	Pld	W	D	L	GF	GA	GD	Pts	Qualification
1	Pakistan	5	5	0	0	23	2	+21	10	Semi-finals
2	West Germany	5	4	0	1	19	6	+13	8	Semi-finals
3	Argentina	5	3	0	2	9	10	−1	6	
4	Ireland	5	2	0	3	7	13	−6	4	
5	Ghana	5	1	0	4	4	16	−12	2	
6	Singapore	5	0	0	5	5	20	−15	0	

Source: FIH

Fixtures

23 August

Pakistan	6 - 0	Ireland
	Report

23 August

Argentina	3 - 1	Ghana
	Report

24 August

West Germany	5 - 0	Ghana
	Report

24 August

Ireland	4 - 1	Singapore
	Report

26 August

Pakistan	5 - 0	Singapore
	Report

26 August

West Germany	3 - 1	Argentina
	Report

27 August

Ghana	3 - 2	Singapore
	Report

27 August

Pakistan	5 - 1	Argentina
	Report

27 August

West Germany	4 - 0	Ireland
	Report

28 August

Ireland	3 - 0	Ghana
	Report

28 August

Argentina	2 - 1	Singapore
	Report

28 August

Pakistan	4 - 1	West Germany
	Report

30 August

Pakistan	3 - 0	Ghana
	Report

30 August

West Germany	6 - 1	Singapore
	Report

30 August

Argentina	2 - 0	Ireland
	Report

== Classification round ==
=== Ninth to twelfth place classification ===
Semi-finals
31 August
Chile	0
Ghana	5
31 August
Spain	8
Singapore	0

Ninth place
2 September
Ghana	4
Spain	7
11th place
2 September
Singapore	3
Chile	2

Crossovers

31 August

Spain	8 - 0	Singapore
	Report

31 August

Ghana	5 - 0	Chile
	Report

Eleventh and twelfth place ( 11th — 12th )

2 September

Singapore	3 - 2	Chile
	Report

Ninth and tenth place ( 9th — 10th )

2 September

Spain	7 - 4	Ghana
	Report

=== Fifth to eighth place classification ===
Semi-finals
31 August
France	2
Argentina	3
31 August
India	3
Ireland	2

Fifth place
2 September
Argentina	1
India	6
Seventh place
2 September
Ireland	2
France	4

Crossovers

31 August

India	3 - 2	Ireland
	Report

31 August

France	2 - 3	Argentina
	Report

Seventh and eighth place ( 7th — 8th )

2 September

Ireland	2 - 4	France
	Report

Fifth and sixth place ( 5th — 6th )

2 September

Argentina	1 - 6	India
	Report

=== Knockout round ===
Semi-finals
31 August
Pakistan	4
Malaysia	2
31 August
Netherlands	1
West Germany	3

Final
2 September
Pakistan	2
West Germany	0
Third place
2 September
Malaysia	1
Netherlands	2

==== Semi-finals ====
31 August

Pakistan	4 - 2	Malaysia
	Report

31 August

Netherlands	1 - 3	West Germany
	Report

Third and fourth place

2 September

Malaysia	1 - 2	Netherlands
	Report

==== Final ====
2 September

Pakistan	2 - 0	West Germany
J. Muhammad 2'; Rashid 46'	Report

== Final standings ==
1. Pakistan
2. West Germany
3. Netherlands
4. Malaysia
5. India
6. Argentina
7. France
8. Ireland
9. Spain
10. Ghana
11. Singapore
12. Chile
