= 1993 Men's Hockey Junior World Cup =

5th edition of the Men's Hockey Junior World Cup

1993 Men's Junior World Cup
Tournament details
- Host country: Spain
- City: Terrassa
- Dates: 8–19 September
- Teams: 12 (from 5 confederations)
- Venue: Atlètic Terrassa Hockey Club

Final positions
- Champions: Germany (4th title)
- Runner-up: Pakistan
- Third place: Australia

Tournament statistics
- Matches played: 42
- Goals scored: 176 (4.19 per match)

The 1993 Men's Hockey Junior World Cup was the fifth edition of the men's Hockey Junior World Cup, the quadrennial world championship for men's national under-21 national field hockey teams organized by the International Hockey Federation. It was held from September 8–19 September 1993 in Terrassa, Spain. Germany won their fourth successive title defeating Pakistan in the final. Australia won the bronze medal after defeating dutch.

== Results ==
All times are Central European Summer Time (UTC+02:00)

=== Preliminary round ===
==== Pool A ====
Pos	Team	Pld	W	D	L	GF	GA	GD	Pts	Qualification
1	Germany	5	4	1	0	19	3	+16	9	Advance to the semi-finals
2	Netherlands	5	4	0	1	23	4	+19	8	Advance to the semi-finals
3	England	5	3	1	1	13	5	+8	7	5th–8th place classification
4	Cuba	5	1	1	3	3	15	−12	3	5th–8th place classification
5	Egypt	5	0	2	3	5	25	−20	2	9th–12th place classification
6	Malaysia	5	0	1	4	5	16	−11	1	9th–12th place classification

Source: FIH

8 September 1993

England	4–0	Cuba

8 September 1993

Netherlands	10–0	Egypt

9 September 1993

Netherlands	5–0	Cuba

9 September 1993

Germany	5–1	Malaysia

10 September 1993

Egypt	1-5	England

11 September 1993

Netherlands	1–3	Germany

11 September 1993

England	3–1	Malaysia

12 September 1993

Germany	6–0	Egypt

12 September 1993

Malaysia	0–1	Cuba

13 September 1993

England	0–2	Netherlands

14 September 1993

Germany	4–0	Cuba

14 September 1993

Malaysia	2–2	Egypt

15 September 1993

Germany	1–1	England

15 September 1993

Cuba	2–2	Egypt

15 September 1993

Netherlands	5–1	Malaysia

==== Pool B ====
Pos	Team	Pld	W	D	L	GF	GA	GD	Pts	Qualification
1	Pakistan	5	4	1	0	18	3	+15	9	Advance to the semi-finals
2	Australia	5	4	1	0	16	4	+12	9	Advance to the semi-finals
3	Argentina	5	2	1	2	7	10	−3	5	5th–8th place classification
4	Spain (H)	5	1	2	2	5	11	−6	4	5th–8th place classification
5	South Korea	5	1	1	3	10	10	0	3	9th–12th place classification
6	Scotland	5	0	0	5	3	21	−18	0	9th–12th place classification

Source: Todor66 FIH
(H) Hosts

8 September 1993

Pakistan	2–1	South Korea

8 September 1993

Argentina	0–2	Australia

8 September 1993

Spain	3–0	Scotland

9 September 1993

Spain	1–1	South Korea

10 September 1993

Australia	5-0	Scotland

10 September 1993

Argentina	1–4	Pakistan

11 September 1993

Spain	1–1	Argentina

12 September 1993

Pakistan	1–1	Australia

12 September 1993

Scotland	1–4	South Korea

13 September 1993

Australia	4–0	Spain

13 September 1993

Pakistan	6–0	Scotland

13 September 1993

South Korea	1–2	Argentina

15 September 1993

Argentina	3–2	Scotland

15 September 1993

Australia	4–3	South Korea

15 September 1993

Pakistan	5–0	Spain

=== Ninth to twelfth place classification ===
Cross-overs
18 September
South Korea (a.e.t.)	3
Malaysia	2
18 September
Egypt	0
Scotland	2

Ninth place
19 September
South Korea	3
Scotland	1
Eleventh place
19 September
Malaysia	4
Egypt	0

==== Cross-overs ====
18 September 1993

Egypt	0–2	Scotland

18 September 1993

South Korea	3–2 (a.e.t.)	Malaysia

==== Eleventh and twelfth place ====
19 September 1993

Malaysia	4–0	Egypt

==== Ninth and tenth place ====
19 September 1993

South Korea	3–1	Scotland

=== Fifth to eighth place classification ===
Cross-overs
17 September
Spain	1
England	3
17 September
Argentina	3
Cuba	0

Fifth place
18 September
England	4
Argentina	2
Seventh place
18 September
Spain	3
Cuba	1

==== Cross-overs ====
17 September 1993

Spain	1–3	England

17 September 1993

Argentina	3–0	Cuba

==== Seventh and eighth place ====
18 September 1993

Spain	3–1	Cuba

==== Fifth and sixth place ====
18 September 1993

England	4-2	Argentina

=== First to fourth place classification ===
Semi-finals
17 September
Germany	2
Australia	0
17 September
Pakistan	4
Netherlands	3

Final
19 September
Germany	3
Pakistan	1
Third place
19 September
Netherlands	1
Australia	3

==== Semi-finals ====
17 September 1993

Australia	0–2	Germany

17 September 1993

Pakistan	4–3	Netherlands

==== Third and fourth place ====
19 September 1993

Netherlands	1–3	Australia

==== Final ====
19 September 1993

Germany	3–1	Pakistan

== Final standings ==
1. Germany
2. Pakistan
3. Australia
4. Netherlands
5. England
6. Argentina
7. Spain
8. Cuba
9. South Korea
10. Scotland
11. Malaysia
12. Egypt
