= 2023 Men's Junior AHF Cup =

Tournament details
- Host country: Oman
- City: Muscat
- Dates: 6–12 January
- Teams: 8 (from 1 confederation)
- Venue: Sultan Qaboos Sports Complex

Final positions
- Champions: Bangladesh (2nd title)
- Runner-up: Oman
- Third place: Thailand

Tournament statistics
- Matches played: 20
- Goals scored: 121 (6.05 per match)
- Top scorer: (Bangladesh) Amirul Islam (9 goals)
- Best player: (Oman) Asama Barazahan
- Best young player: (Uzbekistan) Amur Ismoilov
- Best goalkeeper: (Thailand) Wistawas Phosawang

The 2023 Men's Junior AHF Cup was the sixth edition of the Men's Junior AHF Cup, the qualification tournament for the Men's Hockey Junior Asia Cup organized by the Asian Hockey Federation.

It was held at the Sultan Qaboos Sports Complex in Muscat, Oman from 6 to 12 January 2023. The top five teams qualified for the 2023 Junior Asia Cup. Bangladesh won their second Junior AHF Cup title by defeating the hosts Oman 7–6 in a shoot-out after the final finished 1–1 in regular time.

== Teams ==
The following teams participated in the tournament.

Team	Appearance	Last Appearance	Previous best performance
Bangladesh	3rd	2023	1st (2014)
Chinese Taipei	6th	2023	1st (2003)
Hong Kong	3rd	2023	7th (2003),(2011)
Indonesia	1st	2023	First Appearance (2023)
Oman	6th	2023	1st (2008)
Singapore	4th	2023	2nd (2011)
Sri Lanka	6th	2023	2nd (2003)
Thailand	4th	2023	5th (2014)
Uzbekistan	2nd	2023	4th (2019)

== Preliminary round ==
All times are local, GST (UTC+4).

=== Pool A ===
Pos	Team	Pld	W	D	L	GF	GA	GD	Pts	Qualification
1	Oman (H)	3	3	0	0	24	2	+22	9	Semi-finals and 2023 Junior Asia Cup
2	Thailand	3	1	1	1	4	9	−5	4	Semi-finals and 2023 Junior Asia Cup
3	Chinese Taipei	3	0	2	1	4	12	−8	2	
4	Indonesia	3	0	1	2	3	12	−9	1	

Source: FIH
Rules for classification: 1) points; 2) matches won; 3) goal difference; 4) goals for; 5) head-to-head result; 6) field goals scored.
(H) Hosts

6 January 2023
14:00

Thailand	2–1	Indonesia
Phumee 35'; Rungniyom 56'	Report	Wibowo 16'

Umpires:
Hari Silvarajoo (SGP)
Mohammed Ali Khan (BAN)

6 January 2023
18:00

Oman	9–1	Chinese Taipei
Barazahan 6', 30+'; Al Balushi 8'; Ali. Al-Noufali 31', 56'; Madit 40'; H. Bait 48', 54', 57'	Report	Chang 50'

Umpires:
Munashe Mashoko (ZIM)
Ho King Yiu (HKG)

8 January 2023
16:00

Chinese Taipei	2–2	Indonesia
Wang 26'; Y.-s. Chen 46'	Report	Wibowo 45'; Raditya 51'

Umpires:
Dineshkaran Selvaraja (SRI)
Makhmud Kholmatov (UZB)

8 January 2023
18:00

Oman	7–1	Thailand
H. Bait 5', 30'; Ali. Al-Noufali 16'; T. Bait 21', 23'; Barazahan 46'; Al Balushi 60'	Report	Khamkoed 37'

Umpires:
Hari Silvarajoo (SGP)
Ho King Yiu (HKG)

9 January 2023
16:00

Chinese Taipei	1–1	Thailand
Y.-s. Chen 7'	Report	Chueamkaew 57'

Umpires:
Munashe Mashoko (ZIM)
Mohammad Ali Khan (BAN)

9 January 2023
18:00

Oman	8–0	Indonesia
Al Balushi 10', 52', 53'; Alk. Al-Noufali 12', 43'; Al Hasani 23'; Madit 31'; Al-Mamari 54'	Report

Umpires:
Nozomi Yuzawa (JPN)
Ho King Yiu (HKG)

=== Pool B ===
Pos	Team	Pld	W	D	L	GF	GA	GD	Pts	Qualification
1	Bangladesh	3	3	0	0	24	1	+23	9	Semi-finals and 2023 Junior Asia Cup
2	Uzbekistan	3	2	0	1	9	9	0	6	Semi-finals and 2023 Junior Asia Cup
3	Sri Lanka	3	1	0	2	8	24	−16	3	
4	Hong Kong	3	0	0	3	3	10	−7	0	

Source: FIH
Rules for classification: 1) points; 2) matches won; 3) goal difference; 4) goals for; 5) head-to-head result; 6) field goals scored.

6 January 2023
12:00

Bangladesh	4–0	Hong Kong
Ali 2', 57'; Hasan 14'; Islam 21'	Report

Umpires:
Mazin Al-Shukaili (OMA)
Chung Teng-wei (TPE)

6 January 2023
16:00

Sri Lanka	3–7	Uzbekistan
Hewawasam 29'; Batuvita 40'; Bandara 60'	Report	Ismoilov 5', 21', 26', 34'; O. Khamitov 11'; S. Khamitov 30'; Madaminov 51'

Umpires:
Nozomi Yuzawa (JPN)
Phonphol Phuttarakkit (THA)

7 January 2023
16:00

Sri Lanka	0–14	Bangladesh
	Report	Joy 8', 43'; Hasan 13', 34', 44'; Islam 17', 18', 19', 45', 59'; Ali 22'; M. Hossain 25', 28', 44'

Umpires:
Munashe Mashoko (ZIM)
Nozomi Yuzawa (JPN)

7 January 2023
18:00

Hong Kong	0–1	Uzbekistan
	Report	Ismoilov 52'

Umpires:
Hashim Al-Shatri (OMA)
Feristiwa Hadinata (INA)

9 January 2023
12:00

Bangladesh	6–1	Uzbekistan
Islam 26', 28', 54'; Hasan 33'; Joy 39', 52'	Report	Madaminov 18'

Umpires:
Hari Silvarajoo (SGP)
Mazin Al-Shukaili (OMA)

9 January 2023
14:00

Hong Kong	3–5	Sri Lanka
Chan 25'; McNeil 28'; Singh 38'	Report	Kukulagoda 19'; Jayakodi 23'; Batuvita 34'; Bandara 53', 55'

Umpires:
Chung Teng-Wei (TPE)
Phonphol Phuttarakkit (THA)

== Fifth to eighth place classification ==
=== Bracket ===
Semi-finals
11 January
Sri Lanka (p.s.o.)	3 (5)
Indonesia	3 (4)
11 January
Chinese Taipei	6
Hong Kong	3

Fifth place
12 January
Sri Lanka	4
Chinese Taipei	5
Seventh place
12 January
Indonesia	3
Hong Kong	1

=== Semi-finals ===
11 January 2023
11:45

Sri Lanka
3–3
Indonesia
Bandara 5', 6'
Girabewatte 8'
Report
Sahhal 31'
Stenley 45'
Wibowo 60'
Penalties
Hewawasam (penalty shoot-out scored)
Batuvita (penalty shoot-out scored)
Bandara (penalty shoot-out missed)
Kukulagoda (penalty shoot-out scored)
Jayakodi (penalty shoot-out scored)

Batuvita (penalty shoot-out scored)

5–4
(penalty shoot-out scored) Jodie
(penalty shoot-out scored) Sahhal
(penalty shoot-out scored) Stenley
(penalty shoot-out missed) Mahendra
(penalty shoot-out scored) Iqbal

(penalty shoot-out missed) Yuan

Umpires:
Hashim Al Shatri (OMA)
Mohammad Ali Khan (BAN)

11 January 2023
14:00

Chinese Taipei	6–3	Hong Kong
Shih 21', 34', 49', 56'; Y.-s. Lin 23'; Li 38'	Report	McNeil 41'; Poon 54'; Leung 60'

Umpires:
Hari Silvarajoo (SGP)
Dineshkaran Selvaraja (SRI)

=== Seventh and eighth place ===
12 January 2023
11:45

Indonesia	3–1	Hong Kong
Wibowo 8', 15'; Raditya 23'	Report	McNeil 55'

Umpires:
Chung Teng-wei (TPE)
Makhmud Kholmatov (UZB)

=== Fifth and sixth place ===
12 January 2023
14:00

Sri Lanka	4–5	Chinese Taipei
Batuvita 49'; Bandara 51'; Girabewatte 55'; Jayakodi 58'	Report	Yueh 2'; Shih 47', 48', 50', 57'

Umpires:
Ho King Yiu (HKG)
Hari Silvarajoo (SGP)

== First to fourth place classification ==
=== Bracket ===
Semi-finals
11 January
Oman	5
Uzbekistan	0
11 January
Bangladesh	3
Thailand	0

Final
12 January
Bangladesh (p.s.o.)	1 (7)
Oman	1 (6)
Third place
12 January
Thailand (p.s.o.)	2 (2)
Uzbekistan	2 (1)

=== Semi-finals ===
11 January 2023
16:15

Bangladesh	3–0	Thailand
Jibon 48', 58'; H. Hossain 56'	Report

Umpires:
Nozomi Yuzawa (JPN)
Mazin Al-Shukaili (OMA)

11 January 2023
18:30

Oman	5–0	Uzbekistan
H. Bait 9'; Barazahan 21', 35'; Ali. Al-Noufali 45'; Madit 53'	Report

Umpires:
Munashe Mashoko (ZIM)
Ho King Yiu (HKG)

=== Third and fourth place ===
12 January 2023
16:15

Thailand	2–2	Uzbekistan
Phokphun 35'; Phumee 49'	Report	Sotlikov 4'; Ismoilov 56'
Penalties
Rungniyom (penalty shoot-out scored); Nutbutsaba (penalty shoot-out missed); Phumee (penalty shoot-out missed); Chueamkaew (penalty shoot-out missed); Samoema (penalty shoot-out scored)	2–1	(penalty shoot-out missed) Ismoilov; (penalty shoot-out missed) Vakhobjonov; (penalty shoot-out scored) Madaminov; (penalty shoot-out missed) Husanov; (penalty shoot-out missed) Abboskhonov

Umpires:
Mazin Al-Shukaili (OMA)
Mohammad Ali Khan (BAN)

=== Final ===
12 January 2023
19:15

Bangladesh
1–1
Oman
Hasan 53'
Report
Alk. Al-Noufali 2'
Penalties
Hasan (penalty shoot-out missed)
Rahman (penalty shoot-out scored)
Mohammad (penalty shoot-out scored)
Joy (penalty shoot-out scored)
Jibon (penalty shoot-out missed)

Mohammad (penalty shoot-out scored)
Rahman (penalty shoot-out scored)
Hasan (penalty shoot-out scored)
Joy (penalty shoot-out scored)

7–6
(penalty shoot-out scored) Madit
(penalty shoot-out scored) Ali. Al-Noufali
(penalty shoot-out missed) T. Bait
(penalty shoot-out scored) Barazahan
(penalty shoot-out missed) Alk. Al-Noufali

(penalty shoot-out scored) Madit
(penalty shoot-out scored) Ali. Al-Noufali
(penalty shoot-out scored) Barazahan
(penalty shoot-out missed) T. Bait

Umpires:
Munashe Mashoko (ZIM)
Nozomi Yuzawa (JPN)

== Final standings ==
Pos	Team	Qualification
1	Bangladesh	2023 Junior Asia Cup
2	Oman (H)	2023 Junior Asia Cup
3	Thailand	2023 Junior Asia Cup
4	Uzbekistan	2023 Junior Asia Cup
5	Chinese Taipei	2023 Junior Asia Cup
6	Sri Lanka	
7	Indonesia	
8	Hong Kong	

Source: FIH
(H) Host

== Goalscorers ==
There were 121 goals scored in 20 matches, for an average of 6.05 goals per match.

9 goals

- (Bangladesh) Amirul Islam

8 goals

- (Chinese Taipei) Shih Chung-po

6 goals

- (Bangladesh) Rakibul Hasan
- (Oman) Hussam Bait
- (Sri Lanka) Pramod Bandara
- (Uzbekistan) Amur Ismoilov

5 goals

- (Indonesia) Arthur Wibowo
- (Oman) Hassan Al Balushi
- (Oman) Asama Barazahan

4 goals

- (Bangladesh) Obidul Joy
- (Oman) Aliyas Al-Noufali

3 goals

- (Bangladesh) Md. Ali
- (Bangladesh) Md Hossain
- (Hong Kong) Cameron McNeil
- (Oman) Alkhoder Al-Noufali
- (Oman) Aiman Madit
- (Sri Lanka) Sandaruwan Batuvita

2 goals

- (Bangladesh) Rahid Jibon
- (Chinese Taipei) Chen Yung-sheng
- (Indonesia) Derangga Raditya
- (Oman) Talal Bait
- (Sri Lanka) Radun Girabewatte
- (Sri Lanka) Deshan Jayakodi
- (Thailand) Kritsana Phumee
- (Uzbekistan) Abdusalom Madaminov

1 goal

- (Bangladesh) Hozifa Hossain
- (Chinese Taipei) Chang Chun-yu
- (Chinese Taipei) Li Chi-hsuan
- (Chinese Taipei) Lin Yu-sheng
- (Chinese Taipei) Wang Yo-an
- (Chinese Taipei) Yueh Chin-cheng
- (Hong Kong) Chan Yuet
- (Hong Kong) Chang Chun-yu
- (Hong Kong) Hamish Leung
- (Hong Kong) Navjot Singh
- (Indonesia) Abdul Sahhal
- (Indonesia) Djeuwisd Stenley
- (Oman) Abdul Al Hasani
- (Oman) Omer Al-Mamari
- (Sri Lanka) Alisandarage Hewawasam
- (Sri Lanka) Lahiru Kukulagoda
- (Thailand) Kritsada Chueamkaew
- (Thailand) Phongsakon Khamkoed
- (Thailand) Udomchok Phokphun
- (Thailand) Chanachol Rungniyom
- (Uzbekistan) Omadbek Khamitov
- (Uzbekistan) Shokhrukh Khamitov
- (Uzbekistan) Doston Sotlikov

== See also ==
- 2022 Women's Junior AHF Cup
- 2023 Men's Hockey Junior Asia Cup
