= 2015 Men's Hockey Junior Asia Cup =

International youth field hockey competition

2015 Men’s Hockey Junior Asia Cup
Tournament details
- Host country: Malaysia
- City: Kuantan
- Dates: 14–22 November 2015
- Teams: 8 (from 1 confederation)
- Venue: Wisma Belia Hockey Stadium

Final positions
- Champions: India (3rd title)
- Runner-up: Pakistan
- Third place: South Korea

Tournament statistics
- Matches played: 24
- Goals scored: 133 (5.54 per match)
- Top scorer: (India) Harmanpreet Singh (14 goals)
- Best player: (Malaysia) Shahril Saabah
- Best goalkeeper: (India) Vikas Dahiya

The 2015 Men's Junior Asia Cup was the 8th edition of Men's Hockey Junior Asia Cup. It was held from 14 to 22 November 2015 at the Wisma Belia Hockey Stadium in Kuantan, Malaysia.

India has won the event, beating Pakistan in the Final.

This tournament is a key competition for Asian junior hockey teams, as it serves as a qualifier for the Men's Hockey Junior World Cup held in India in December 2016.

In the last season, held in Ipoh in December 2013, Malaysia won the tournament.

== Qualified teams ==
Dates	Event	Location	Quotas	Qualifiers
3–13 May 2012	2012 Junior Asia Cup	Malacca, Malaysia	6	China; India; Japan; Malaysia; Pakistan; South Korea
30 November – 7 December 2014	2014 Junior AHF Cup	Dhaka, Bangladesh	2	Bangladesh; Oman
Total			8	

== Preliminary round ==
Pool matches were played from 14 to 17 November 2015.

=== Pool A ===
Pos	Team	Pld	W	D	L	GF	GA	GD	Pts
1	India	3	3	0	0	11	6	+5	9
2	Malaysia (H)	3	1	1	1	10	7	+3	4
3	Japan	3	1	1	1	5	5	0	4
4	China	3	0	0	3	2	10	−8	0

Source: FIH
(H) Hosts

14 November 2015
18:00

Malaysia	4–0	China
Najmi 14', 70'; Shahril 21'; Shamsul 43'	Report

Umpires:
Shahbaz Ali (BAN)
Napoleon Chanamthabam (IND)

14 November 2015
20:15

India	2–1	Japan
Harmanpreet 28', 40'	Report	Ochiai 26'

Umpires:
Ben De Young (AUS)
Munir Ahmad (PAK)

15 November 2015
18:00

China	1–2	Japan
Su Lixing 12'	Report	Miyazaki 49'; Yamada 52'

Umpires:
Mahmood Al-Hasani (OMA)
Puvalagan Paskaran (MAS)

15 November 2015
20:15

Malaysia	4–5	India
Shahril 1', 20', 66'; Sufi Ismat 62'	Report	Mandeep 10', 61'; Gurjant 40'; Harmanpreet 46', 56'

Umpires:
Dave Dowdall (ENG)
Tao Zhinan (CHN)

17 November 2015
18:00

India	4–1	China
Harmanpreet 16'; Ajit 37'; Manpreet 52', 67'	Report	Guo Haifeng 43'

Umpires:
Kim Byung-hoon (KOR)
Mahmood Al-Hasani (OMA)

17 November 2015
20:15

Japan	2–2	Malaysia
Tanimitsu 49'; Yamada 69'	Report	Azwar 15'; Shamsul 66'

Umpires:
Ben De Young (AUS)
Dave Dowdall (ENG)

=== Pool B ===
Pos	Team	Pld	W	D	L	GF	GA	GD	Pts
1	Pakistan	3	3	0	0	13	2	+11	9
2	Bangladesh	3	2	0	1	8	7	+1	6
3	South Korea	3	1	0	2	5	7	−2	3
4	Oman	3	0	0	3	7	17	−10	0

Source: FIH

14 November 2015
16:00

Pakistan	3–1	Bangladesh
Ali 29'; Qadir 39'; Riaz 70'	Report	Sabbir 32'

Umpires:
Dave Dowdall (ENG)
Puvalagan Paskaran (MAS)

14 November 2015
16:30

South Korea	5–2	Oman
Suk Yu-seong 10', 44'; Seo Wooh-yeong 12'; Kim Seong-jae 53'; Kim Sung-yeob 68'	Report	Al-Lawati 39'; Al-Nofali 62'

Umpires:
Tao Zhinan (CHN)
Shigeki Kodama (JPN)

15 November 2015
16:00

Pakistan	3–0	South Korea
Dilber 8', 42'; Mahmood 49'	Report

Umpires:
Ben De Young (AUS)
Shahbaz Ali (BAN)

15 November 2015
16:30

Oman	4–5	Bangladesh
Al-Lawati 3', 20'; Al-Batashi 38'; Al-Shaaibi 56'	Report	Roman 4'; Ashraful 11', 38'; Arshad 16'; Deen 25'

Umpires:
Kim Byung-hoon (KOR)
Napoleon Chanamthabam (IND)

17 November 2015
16:00

Oman	1–7	Pakistan
Al-Shatari 5'	Report	Dilber 3', 62', 65'; Mahmood 8', 34'; Qadir 15'; Atiq 34'

Umpires:
Napoleon Chanamthabam (IND)
Shigeki Kodama (JPN)

17 November 2015
16:30

South Korea	0–2	Bangladesh
	Report	Sarower 25'; Milon 46'

Umpires:
Munir Ahmad (PAK)
Tao Zhinan (CHN)

== Medal round ==
=== Bracket ===
Quarter-finals
19 November
India	9
Oman	0
19 November
Bangladesh	0
Japan	3
19 November
Malaysia	3 (1)
South Korea (s.o.)	3 (4)
19 November
Pakistan	4
China	1

Semi-finals
21 November
India	6
Japan	1
21 November
South Korea	2 (7)
Pakistan (s.o.)	2 (8)

Final
22 November
India	6
Pakistan	2
Third place
22 November
Japan	1
South Korea	2

=== Quarter-finals ===
All quarterfinal matches were played on 19 November 2015.

19 November 2015
15:45

India	9–0	Oman
Harmanpreet 7', 12', 50'; Armaan 10'; Gurjant 18'; Santa 22'; Mandeep 30'; Harjeet 45'; Umar 54'	Report

Umpires:
Shigeki Kodama (JPN)
Kim Byung-hoon (KOR)

19 November 2015
16:00

Bangladesh	0–3	Japan
	Report	Ochiai 21'; Yamada 68', 68'

Umpires:
Dave Dowdall (ENG)
Puvalagan Paskaran (MAS)

19 November 2015
18:15

Malaysia	3–3	South Korea
Shahril 6'; Sufi Ismat 31'; Shamsul 63'	Report	Kim Sung-yeob 61'; Sim Jae-won 68'; Yoo Han-young 70'
Penalties
Shahril (penalty shoot-out scored); Aiman (penalty shoot-out missed); Azwar (penalty shoot-out missed)	1–4	(penalty shoot-out scored) Kim Yong-bok; (penalty shoot-out scored) Kim Ki-hoon; (penalty shoot-out scored) Ji Woo-cheon; (penalty shoot-out scored) Yoo Han-young

Umpires:
Tao Zhinan (CHN)
Napoleon Chanamthabam (IND)

19 November 2015
20:30

Pakistan	4–1	China
Ali 26'; Irshad 27', 44'; Dilber 67'	Report	Meng Lei 17'

Umpires:
Ben De Young (AUS)
Shahbaz Ali (BAN)

=== Fifth to eighth place classification ===
Cross-overs
21 November
Oman	2 (2)
Bangladesh (s.o.)	2 (3)
21 November
Malaysia	5
China	1

Fifth place
22 November
Bangladesh	0
Malaysia	8
Seventh place
22 November
Oman	2
China	7

==== Cross-overs ====
21 November 2015
15:45

Oman	2–2	Bangladesh
Al-Nofali 64'; Al-Shatari 67'	Report	Roman 31'; Milon 70+'
Penalties
Al-Shatari (penalty shoot-out scored); Al-Shaaibi (penalty shoot-out missed); Al-Lawati (penalty shoot-out missed); Al-Nofali (penalty shoot-out missed); Al-Hasani (penalty shoot-out scored)	2–3	(penalty shoot-out scored) Farhad; (penalty shoot-out missed) Roman; (penalty shoot-out scored) Sabbir; (penalty shoot-out missed) Ashraful; (penalty shoot-out scored) Fazla

Umpires:
Kim Byung-hoon (KOR)
Munir Ahmad (PAK)

21 November 2015
16:00

Malaysia	5–1	China
Shahril 41', 52', 64'; Aiman 56'; Syed 67'	Report	E Wenlong 53'

Umpires:
Mahmood Al-Hasani (OMA)
Shahbaz Ali (BAN)

==== Seventh and eighth place ====
22 November 2015
15:45

Oman	2–7	China
Al-Nofali 33'; Al-Lawati 57'	Report	Zhang Taozhu 20', 21'; Wang Yongze 28', 51'; Li Huixin 45'; Meng Wei 49'; Wang Yongze 51'; Meng Dihao 55'

Umpires:
Munir Ahmad (PAK)
Shigeki Kodama (JPN)

==== Fifth and sixth place ====
22 November 2015
16:00

Bangladesh	0–8	Malaysia
	Report	Sufi Ismat 2', 6', 30', 44'; Najmi 52', 58'; Azwar 56'; Shamsul 66'

Umpires:
Mahmood Al-Hasani (OMA)
Dave Dowdall (ENG)

=== First to fourth place classification ===
==== Semi-finals ====
21 November 2015
18:15

India	6–1	Japan
Mandeep 12'; Manpreet 13'; Harmanpreet 23', 48'; Vikramjit 27'; Varun 64'	Report	Yamada 44'

Umpires:
Ben de Young (AUS)
Puvalagan Paskaran (MAS)

21 November 2015
20:30

South Korea	2–2	Pakistan
Kim Sung-yeob 18', 41'	Report	Butt 46', 70'
Penalties
Kim Yong-bok (penalty shoot-out scored); Kim Ki-hoon (penalty shoot-out scored); Ji Woo-cheon (penalty shoot-out scored); Yoo Han-young (penalty shoot-out scored); Geum Dong-hun (penalty shoot-out missed); Kim Ki-hoon (penalty shoot-out scored); Ji Woo-cheon (penalty shoot-out scored); Kim Yong-bok (penalty shoot-out scored); Yoo Han-young (penalty shoot-out missed)	7–8	(penalty shoot-out missed) Qadir; (penalty shoot-out scored) Irshad; (penalty shoot-out scored) Dilber; (penalty shoot-out scored) Atiq; (penalty shoot-out scored) Butt; (penalty shoot-out scored) Dilber; (penalty shoot-out scored) Atiq; (penalty shoot-out scored) Butt; (penalty shoot-out scored) Irshad

Umpires:
Dave Dowdall (ENG)
Tao Zhinan (CHN)

==== Third and fourth place ====
22 November 2015
18:15

Japan	1–2	South Korea
Miyazaki 34'	Report	Kim Sung-yeob 3'; Ji Woo-cheon 18'

Umpires:
Ben De Young (AUS)
Shahbaz Ali (BAN)

==== Final ====
22 November 2015
20:30

India	6–2	Pakistan
Harmanpreet 10', 15', 30', 53'; Armaan 44'; Manpreet 50'	Report	Yaqoob 28'; Dilber 68'

Umpires:
Tao Zhinan (CHN)
Puvalagan Paskaran (MAS)

== Statistics ==
All statistics are correct as on 27 November 2015.

=== Final standings ===
Pos	Team	Qualification
1st place, gold medalist(s)	India	2016 Junior World Cup
2nd place, silver medalist(s)	Pakistan	2016 Junior World Cup
3rd place, bronze medalist(s)	South Korea	2016 Junior World Cup
4	Japan	2016 Junior World Cup
5	Malaysia (H)	
6	Bangladesh	
7	China	
8	Oman	

Source: FIH
(H) Host

=== Awards ===
Award	Player/Team
Top Goalscorer	(India) Harmanpreet Singh
Player of the Tournament	(Malaysia) Shahril Saabah
Goalkeeper of the Tournament	(India) Vikas Dahiya
Fair Play Award	Japan

== See also ==
- 2015 Women's Hockey Junior Asia Cup
