= Bangladesh men's national under-21 field hockey team =

Bangladesh
- Association: Bangladesh Hockey Federation (BHF)
- Confederation: Asian Hockey Federation (AHF)
- Head Coach: Siegfried Aikman
- Captain: Tanvir Rahman Siyam
- Most caps: Ashraful Islam (24)
- Top scorer: Amirul Islam (36)
Home	Away

First international
- Bangladesh 0–0 China (Kuala Lumpur, Malaysia; 11 September 1992)

Biggest win
- Bangladesh 14–0 Iran (Kuala Lumpur, Malaysia; 6 May 2000); Sri Lanka 0–14 Bangladesh (Muscat, Oman; 7 January 2023)

Biggest defeat
- Bangladesh 0–10 India (Karachi, Pakistan; 24 April 2004)

Junior World Cup
- Appearances: 1 (first in 2025)
- Best result: 17th (2025)

Junior Asia Cup
- Appearances: 9 (first in 1992)
- Best result: 5th (1992, 2024)
Medal record
Men's Junior AHF Cup
Gold medal – first place	2014 Bangladesh
Gold medal – first place	2023 Oman
Gold medal – first place	2024 Singapore
Bronze medal – third place	2003 Singapore

The Bangladesh men's national under-21 field hockey team represents Bangladesh in men's international field hockey and is controlled by the Bangladesh Hockey Federation (BHF). The team participates in the Men's Hockey Junior Asia Cup and Men's Junior AHF Cup.

== History ==
Bangladesh men's national under-21 field hockey team represents Bangladesh in the world hockey tournaments. The team mostly participate in Men's Hockey Junior Asia Cup and they have finished 5th place in 1992. They won the Challenger Trophy in their debut 2025 World Cup tournament and finished 17th among 24.

== Home stadium ==
The Bangladesh national under-21 field hockey team played their home games at Maulana Bhasani Hockey Stadium, Dhaka in Bangladesh.

== Current squad ==
The team qualified for the Men's FIH hockey Junior World Cup jointly hosted by Madurai and Chennai in Tamil Nadu from 1 to 10 December 2025. The following squad played the 2023 Men's Hockey Junior Asia Cup.

As of 28 May 2023

No.	Pos.	Player	Date of birth (age)	Caps	Club
1	GK	Md Noyon	8 April 2002 (age 24)		(Bangladesh)
2	DF	Sabadur Mithu	18 September 2002 (age 24)		(Bangladesh)
3	DF	Md Shaikat	8 February 2002 (age 24)		(Bangladesh)
4	MF	Md Hasan	5 December 2002 (age 23)		(Bangladesh)
5	MF	Aman Sharif	13 September 2002 (age 24)		(Bangladesh)
6	DF	Mehrab Hossain Samin	6 September 2002 (age 24)		(Bangladesh)
7	DF	Md Joy	20 March 2002 (age 24)		(Bangladesh)
8	FW	Prince Samundo (Captain)	4 August 2002 (age 24)		(Bangladesh)
9	DF	Md Ali	22 February 2002 (age 24)		(Bangladesh)
10	MF	Md Hasan	18 September 2002 (age 24)		(Bangladesh)
11	MF	Md Uddin	8 March 2002 (age 24)		(Bangladesh)
12	FW	Md Abdullah	13 May 2002 (age 24)		(Bangladesh)
13	DF	Md Rahad Jibon	8 January 2002 (age 24)		(Bangladesh)
14	FW	Md Saju	6 February 2002 (age 24)		(Bangladesh)
15	MF	Md Hossain	30 June 2002 (age 24)		(Bangladesh)
16	FW	Md Rahim	14 November 2002 (age 23)		(Bangladesh)
17	MF	Amirul Islam	5 April 2002 (age 24)		(Bangladesh)
18	MF	Md Saijuddin	8 July 2002 (age 24)		(Bangladesh)

== Results and fixtures ==
Legend

Win Draw Lose Fixture

=== 2023 ===
6 January 2023 2023 Men's Junior AHF Cup Preliminary round Pool B	Bangladesh	4–0	Hong Kong	Muscat, Oman
14:00 BST (UTC+6)	Ali 2', 57'; Hasan 14'; Islam 21'	Report		Stadium: Sultan Qaboos Sports Complex

7 January 2023 2023 Men's Junior AHF Cup Preliminary round Pool B	Sri Lanka	0–14	Bangladesh	Muscat, Oman
18:00 BST (UTC+6)		Report		Stadium: Sultan Qaboos Sports Complex

9 January 2023 2023 Men's Junior AHF Cup Preliminary round Pool B	Bangladesh	6–1	Uzbekistan	Muscat, Oman
14:00 BST (UTC+6)		Report		Stadium: Sultan Qaboos Sports Complex

11 January 2023 2023 Men's Junior AHF Cup Semi-finals	Bangladesh	3–0	Thailand	Muscat, Oman
20:30 BST (UTC+6)		Report		Stadium: Sultan Qaboos Sports Complex

12 January 2023 2023 Men's Junior AHF Cup Final	Bangladesh	1–1 (7–6 p)	Oman	Muscat, Oman
21:15 BST (UTC+6)		Report		Stadium: Sultan Qaboos Sports Complex

23 May 2023 2023 Men's Hockey Junior Asia Cup Preliminary round	Oman	0–2	Bangladesh	Salala, Oman
22:00 BST (UTC+6)		Report	Ali 22'; Hossain 24'	Stadium: Salalah Sports Complex

25 May 2023 2023 Men's Hockey Junior Asia Cup Preliminary round	Malaysia	5–1	Bangladesh	Salalah, Oman
17:30 BST (UTC+6)	Shafiq Ikhmal 8'; Shahmie Irfan 13', 43', 59'; Syamim 14'	Report	Abdullah 37'	Stadium: Salalah Sports Complex

26 May 2023 2023 Men's Hockey Junior Asia Cup Preliminary round	Bangladesh	3–1	Uzbekistan	Salalah, Oman
22:00 BST (UTC+6)	Islam 15', 22'; Uddin 34'	Report	Husanov 51'	Stadium: Salalah Sports Complex

28 May 2023 2023 Men's Hockey Junior Asia Cup Preliminary round	South Korea	3–1	Bangladesh	Salalah, Oman
19:45 BST (UTC+6)	Lim 11'; Park G. 36'; Kim M. 54'	Report	Hasan 58'	Stadium: Salalah Sports Complex

30 May 2023 2023 Men's Hockey Junior Asia Cup 5–8th place Semi-finals	Bangladesh	4–1	Thailand	Salalah, Oman
22:00 BST (UTC+6)	Ali 1'; Islam 10'; Hasan 18'; Hossain 57'	Report	Phumee 17'	Stadium: Salalah Sports Complex

1 June 2023 2023 Men's Hockey Junior Asia Cup Fifth and sixth place	Japan	5–1	Bangladesh	Salalah, Oman
17:00 BST (UTC+6)	Tanaka 6', 12'; Shigeyama 8'; I. Saeki 26'; Matsuzaki 55'	Report	Ali 47'	Stadium: Salalah Sports Complex

=== 2024 ===
16 June 2024 2024 Men's Junior AHF Cup Preliminary round	Bangladesh	7–0	Singapore	Singapore City, Singapore
15:00 BST (UTC+6)	Md Hasan 9'; Islam 11', 15', 28', 34', 38'; Md Joy 12'	Report		Stadium: Sengkang Sports Centre

17 June 2024 2024 Men's Junior AHF Cup Preliminary round	Sri Lanka	0–5	Bangladesh	Singapore City, Singapore
15:00 BST (UTC+6)		Report	Islam 25'; Md Abdullah 44'; Din Islam 51', 55', 56'	Stadium: Sengkang Sports Centre

19 June 2024 2024 Men's Junior AHF Cup Preliminary round	Thailand	2–4	Bangladesh	Singapore City, Singapore
15:00 BST (UTC+6)	Kraiwich Thawichat 11'; Arfis Oh-Hayseeda 56'	Report	Md Abdullah 15'; Md Islam 26'; Aman Shorif 40'; Md Hossain 48'	Stadium: Sengkang Sports Centre

20 June 2024 2024 Men's Junior AHF Cup Preliminary round	Bangladesh	7–0	Indonesia	Singapore City, Singapore
15:30 BST (UTC+6)	Md Abdullah 3', 54'; MM Mehrab Hasan Samin 7'; Islam 9'; Din Islam 13'; Md Jibon 32'; Md Islam 60'	Report		Stadium: Sengkang Sports Centre

22 June 2024 2024 Men's Junior AHF Cup Semi-finals	Bangladesh	5–1	Chinese Taipei	Singapore City, Singapore
14:30 BST (UTC+6)	Md Joy 5'; Islam 16', 31'; Md Abdullah 23', 58'	Report	Ze-Cheng Wei 5'	Stadium: Sengkang Sports Centre

23 June 2024 2024 Men's Junior AHF Cup Final	Bangladesh	4–2	China	Singapore City, Singapore
16:30 BST (UTC+6)	Md Hasan 22', 27'; Islam 25'; Md Joy 53'	Report	Jialong Luo 33'; Xianzhen Chen 41'	Stadium: Sengkang Sports Centre

26 November 2024 2024 Men's Hockey Junior Asia Cup Pool B	Bangladesh	3–1	Oman	Muscat, Oman
21:00 BST (UTC+6)	Hassan 7'; Hasan 37', 38'	Report	Al Wahaibi 55'	Stadium: Hockey Stadium Oman

28 November 2024 2024 Men's Hockey Junior Asia Cup Pool B	Bangladesh	0–6	Pakistan	Muscat, Oman
18:45 BST (UTC+6)		Report	Khan 23', 32', 43'; Ammad 23'; Rana 51'; Hayat 60'	Stadium: Hockey Stadium Oman

30 November 2024 2024 Men's Hockey Junior Asia Cup Pool B	Bangladesh	2–2	Malaysia	Muscat, Oman
16:30 BST (UTC+6)	Islam 27'; Hasan 36'	Report	Danial 2'; Norizam 40'	Stadium: Hockey Stadium Oman

1 December 2024 2024 Men's Hockey Junior Asia Cup Pool B	China	1–1	Bangladesh	Muscat, Oman
16:30 BST (UTC+6)	Wang Y. 45'	Report	Ali 41'	Stadium: Hockey Stadium Oman

3 December 2024 2024 Men's Hockey Junior Asia Cup Semi-finals	Bangladesh	7–2	Thailand	Muscat, Oman
13:30 BST (UTC+6)	Joy 3', 39'; Islam 6'; Abdullah 16', 49'; Hasan 34'; Khan 36'	Report	Chueamkaew 30+'; Phumee 35'	Stadium: Hockey Stadium Oman

4 December 2024 2024 Men's Hockey Junior Asia Cup 5–6 place match	Bangladesh	6–3	China	Muscat, Oman
16:00 BST (UTC+6)	Hasan 1', 52', 60'; Islam 21', 26', 30+'	Report	Chen Z. 11'; Zhang J. 19', 42'	Stadium: Hockey Stadium Oman

=== 2025 ===
29 November 2025 2025 Hockey Junior World Cup Pool F	Australia	5–3	Bangladesh	Tamil Nadu, India
16:30 BST (UTC+6)	Will 1'; Grobbelaar 18'; Brick 22'; Jackson 24'; Stanger 48'	Report	Islam 14', 42', 59'	Stadium: Mayor Radhakrishnan Hockey Stadium

30 November 2025 2025 Hockey Junior World Cup Pool F	South Korea	3–3	Bangladesh	Tamil Nadu, India
18:15 BST (UTC+6)	Lee M. 8', 17'; Son 13'	Report	Islam 36', 46', 56'	Stadium: Mayor Radhakrishnan Hockey Stadium

2 December 2025 2025 Hockey Junior World Cup Pool F	France	3–2	Bangladesh	Tamil Nadu, India
16:15 BST (UTC+6)	Gaillard 7'; Lorrazuri 32'; Liddiard 38'	Report	Abdullah 28'; Islam 55'	Stadium: Mayor Radhakrishnan Hockey Stadium

4 December 2025 2025 Hockey Junior World Cup 17th/24th Quarter-final	Bangladesh	13–0	Oman	Tamil Nadu, India
11:00 BST (UTC+6)	Islam 11', 15', 15', 34', 53'; Hasan 19', 25', 47'; Abdullah 33', 47'; Joy 40'; Saju 51', 60'	Report		Stadium: Madurai International Hockey Stadium

6 December 2025 2025 Hockey Junior World Cup 17th/20th classification	Bangladesh	5–3	South Korea	Tamil Nadu, India
16:00 BST (UTC+6)	Islam 21', 24', 35'; Joy 52'; Hasan 60'	Report	Lee M. 10', 20', 53'	Stadium: Madurai International Hockey Stadium

8 December 2025 2025 Hockey Junior World Cup 17th & 18th place match	Austria	4–5	Bangladesh	Tamil Nadu, India
16:00 BST (UTC+6)	Losonci 44'; Kelner 51'; Kaiser 57'; Nyckowiak 59'	Report	Islam 15', 50', 52'; Hossain 27'; Hasan 35'	Stadium: Madurai International Hockey Stadium

=== 2026 ===
4 September 2026 2026 Junior Asia Cup Pool B	Bangladesh	2–3	China	Moqi, China
15:00 BST (UTC+6)	Md Islam 6'; Hassan 26'	Report	Wang 6'; Qiu 44'; Sun 53'	Stadium: Moqi Training Base

6 September 2026 2026 Junior Asia Cup Pool B	Bangladesh	2–4	Malaysia	Moqi, China
13:00 BST (UTC+6)	Abdullah 24'; Hassan 33'	Report	Gunaseelan 21'; Silverius 23'; Fahmi 48', 51'	Stadium: Moqi Training Base

8 September 2026 2026 Junior Asia Cup Pool B	Kazakhstan	2–4	Bangladesh	Moqi, China
15:00 BST (UTC+6)	Kairatuly 7'; Zhanat 36'	Report	S. Islam 3'; Hassan 25'; Tayab 33'; M. Islam 50'	Stadium: Moqi Training Base

9 September 2026 2026 Junior Asia Cup Pool B	Bangladesh	0–3	Pakistan	Moqi, China
13:00 BST (UTC+6)		Report	Rana 9', 12'; Mustafa 52'	Stadium: Moqi Training Base

11 September 2026 2026 Junior Asia Cup 5/8 Classification	Japan	6–2	Bangladesh	Moqi, China
12:30 BST (UTC+6)	Yamada 2'; Sone 29'; Hanayama 30'; Sakai 36', 41'; Toya 45'	Report	Mehedi 41'; M. Islam 50'	Stadium: Moqi Training Base

12 September 2026 2026 Junior Asia Cup 7th place match	Chinese Taipei	2–5	Bangladesh	Moqi, China
14:45 BST (UTC+6)	Li 12'; Chang 44'	Report	M. Islam 6'; Rifat 23', 48'; Tayab 44'; Abdullah 55'	Stadium: Moqi Training Base

== Competitive records ==
=== Junior World Cup ===
Men's FIH Hockey Junior World Cup records
Year	Round	Position	GP	W	D	L	GS	GA
(France) 1979	Did not qualify							
(Malaysia) 1982	Did not qualify							
(Canada) 1985	Did not qualify							
(Malaysia) 1989	Did not qualify							
(Spain) 1993	Did not qualify							
(England) 1997	Did not qualify							
(Australia) 2001	Did not qualify							
(Netherlands) 2005	Did not qualify							
(Malaysia) 2009	Did not qualify							
(India) 2013	Did not qualify							
(India) 2016	Did not qualify							
(India) 2021	Did not qualify							
(Malaysia) 2023	Did not qualify							
(India) 2025	17th-place		6	3	1	2	31	18
2027	TBD							
Total	Best results: 17th place	17/24	6	3	1	2	31	18

=== Junior Asia Cup ===
Men's Hockey Junior Asia Cup records
Year	Round	Position	GP	W	D	L	GS	GA
(Pakistan) 1988	Did not enter							
(Malaysia) 1992	Group stage	5th-place	6	2	2	2	13	11
(Singapore) 1996	Group stage	6th-place	6	2	1	3	16	13
(Malaysia) 2000	Group stage	7th-place	7	3	1	3	25	20
(Pakistan) 2004	Group stage	6th-place	6	2	1	3	8	17
(India) 2008	Group stage	6th-place	5	2	0	3	12	19
(Malaysia) 2012	Did not participate							
(Malaysia) 2015	Quarter-finals	6th-place	6	2	1	3	10	20
(Bangladesh) 2021	Cancelled due to Covid-19 pandemic							
(Oman) 2023	Group stage	6th-place	6	3	0	3	12	15
(Oman) 2024	Group stage	5th-place	6	3	2	1	19	15
(China) 2026	Group stage	7th-place	6	2	0	4	15	20
Total	Best results: 5th	5/10	54	21	8	25	130	150

=== Junior AHF Cup ===
Men's Junior AHF Cup records
Year	Round	Position	GP	W	D	L	GS	GA
(Singapore) 2003	Semi-finals	3rd-place	6	4	1	1	18	11
(Oman) 2008	Did not participate							
(Hong Kong) 2011	Did not participate							
(Bangladesh) 2014	Champion	1st-place	5	5	0	0	35	0
(Oman) 2019	Did not participate							
(Oman) 2023	Champion	1st-place	5	5	0	0	28	2
(Singapore) 2024	Champion	1st-place	6	6	0	0	32	5
Total	4/6	3 Titles	22	20	1	1	113	18

== Head-to-head record ==
As of 12 September 2026

Against	Region	P	W	D	L	GF	GA	GD	%Win
Australia	OHF	1	0	0	1	3	5	−2	0.00
Austria	EHF	1	1	0	0	5	4	+1	100.00
Chile	PAHF	1	1	0	0	3	0	+3	100.00
China	AHF	9	3	4	2	20	19	+1	33.33
Chinese Taipei	AHF	4	4	0	0	19	4	+15	100.00
France	EHF	1	0	0	1	2	3	−1	0.00
Hong Kong	AHF	2	2	0	0	9	0	+9	100.00
India	AHF	5	1	0	4	5	24	−19	20.00
Indonesia	AHF	1	1	0	0	7	0	+7	100.00
Iran	AHF	2	2	0	0	22	0	+22	100.00
Japan	AHF	6	0	1	5	4	19	−15	0.00
Kazakhstan	AHF	1	1	0	0	4	2	+2	100.00
Malaysia	AHF	8	0	1	7	9	29	−20	0.00
Oman	AHF	10	10	0	0	47	10	+37	100.00
Pakistan	AHF	5	0	0	5	4	27	−23	0.00
Singapore	AHF	7	7	0	0	31	5	+26	100.00
South Korea	AHF	6	2	1	3	12	22	−10	33.33
Sri Lanka	AHF	5	4	1	0	30	2	+28	80.00
Switzerland	EHF	1	1	0	0	5	2	+3	100.00
Thailand	AHF	5	5	0	0	28	6	+22	100.00
Uzbekistan	AHF	3	3	0	0	14	3	+11	100.00
Total	21 Nations	84	48	8	28	283	186	+97	57.14

== See also ==
- Bangladesh women's national field hockey team
- Bangladesh men's national field hockey team
- Bangladesh men's national indoor hockey team
- Bangladesh women's national under-21 field hockey team
