= 2024 Men's Junior AHF Cup =

Field hockey tournament

Tournament details
- Host country: Singapore
- Dates: 14–23 June
- Teams: 11 (from 1 confederation)
- Venue: Sengkang Sports Centre

Final positions
- Champions: Bangladesh (3rd title)
- Runner-up: China
- Third place: Thailand

Tournament statistics
- Matches played: 33
- Goals scored: 185 (5.61 per match)
- Top scorer: (Kazakhstan) Agymtay Duisengazy (12 goals)
- Best player: (China) Ning Dongjun

The 2024 Men's Junior AHF Cup was the seventh edition of the Men's Junior AHF Cup, the biennial qualification tournament for the Men's Hockey Junior Asia Cup, organized by the Asian Hockey Federation. The tournament was held from 14 to 23 June 2024 alongside the women's tournament at the Sengkang Sports Centre in Singapore.

The top five teams qualified for the 2024 Men's Hockey Junior Asia Cup. Bangladesh were the defending champions. They defended their title and won their third Junior AHF Cup overall by defeating China 4–2 in the final. Thailand won the bronze medal by defeating Chinese Taipei 3–2 in a shoot-out after the match finished 2–2.

== Preliminary round ==
=== Pool A ===
Pos	Team	Pld	W	D	L	GF	GA	GD	Pts	Qualification
1	Bangladesh	4	4	0	0	23	2	+21	12	Semi-finals and 2024 Junior Asia Cup
2	Thailand	4	3	0	1	9	5	+4	9	Semi-finals and 2024 Junior Asia Cup
3	Indonesia	4	2	0	2	5	12	−7	6	
4	Singapore (H)	4	1	0	3	2	12	−10	3	
5	Sri Lanka	4	0	0	4	4	12	−8	0	

Source: FIH
Rules for classification: 1) points; 2) matches won; 3) goal difference; 4) goals for; 5) head-to-head result; 6) field goals for.
(H) Hosts

14 June 2024
17:00

Sri Lanka	2–3	Indonesia
Rathnasooriya 9'; Abeygunawardana 56'	Report	Wibowo 12', 53'; Adzami 51'

Umpires:
Gang Chi (CHN)
Vincent Chang (HKG)

14 June 2024
19:00

Thailand	2–0	Singapore
Thawichat 30'; Samarng 47'	Report

Umpires:
Thipak Kanabathu (MAS)
Ismail Hossain Liton (BAN)

16 June 2024
15:30

Thailand	3–0	Indonesia
Kaoechianghwang 22'; Chueamkaew 25'; Chaimanee 40'	Report

Umpires:
Gang Chi (CHN)
Ismail Hossain Liton (BAN)

16 June 2024
17:00

Bangladesh	7–0	Singapore
Hasan 9'; A. Islam 11', 15', 28', 34', 38'; Joy 12'	Report

Umpires:
Kenta Uziie (JPN)
Phiraphat Niensupornphand (THA)

17 June 2024
17:00

Sri Lanka	0–5	Bangladesh
	Report	A. Islam 25'; Ayuka 44'; M. Fernando 51', 55', 56'

Umpires:
Mahmood Al Hasani (OMA)
Morteza Ahmadi (IRI)

17 June 2024
19:00

Indonesia	2–0	Singapore
Jodie 50'; Raditya 58'	Report

Umpires:
Yaser Khurshid (PAK)
Daulet Urmanov (KAZ)

19 June 2024
17:00

Thailand	2–4	Bangladesh
Thawichat 11'; Hayseeda-Oh 56'	Report	Abdullah 15'; S. Islam 26'; Shorif 40'; Hossain 48'

Umpires:
Valerie Koh (SGP)
Shigeki Kodama (JPN)

19 June 2024
19:00

Singapore	2–1	Sri Lanka
Yap 40', 59'	Report	Ravindu 12'

Umpires:
Yao Liu (CHN)
Thipak Kanabathu (MAS)

20 June 2024
17:00

Sri Lanka	1–2	Thailand
Abeygunawardana 54'	Report	Phumee 3'; Chaimanee 55'

Umpires:
Valerie Koh (SGP)
Kenta Uziie (JPN)

20 June 2024
17:30

Bangladesh	7–0	Indonesia
Abdullah 3', 54'; Samin M M 7'; A. Islam 9'; D. Islam 13'; Jibon 32'; S. Islam 60'	Report

Umpires:
Yao Liu (CHN)
Yaser Khurshid (PAK)

=== Pool B ===
Pos	Team	Pld	W	D	L	GF	GA	GD	Pts	Qualification
1	China	5	5	0	0	32	8	+24	15	Semi-finals and 2024 Junior Asia Cup
2	Chinese Taipei	5	4	0	1	30	9	+21	12	Semi-finals and 2024 Junior Asia Cup
3	Oman	5	3	0	2	17	13	+4	9	
4	Iran	5	1	1	3	6	22	−16	4	
5	Hong Kong	5	0	2	3	1	19	−18	2	
6	Kazakhstan	5	0	1	4	8	23	−15	1	

Source: FIH
Rules for classification: 1) points; 2) matches won; 3) goal difference; 4) goals for; 5) head-to-head result; 6) field goals for.

14 June 2024
15:00

China	5–0	Hong Kong
Yu H. 15'; Di 17'; Sun 28'; Tan 45'; Mu 46'	Report

Umpires:
Kenta Uziie (JPN)
Mahmood Al Hasani (OMA)

14 June 2024
15:30

Oman	5–1	Kazakhstan
A. Al-Noufali 8'; T. Bait 15'; Madit 28', 37', 53'	Report	A. Duisengazy 16'

Umpires:
Yaser Khurshid (PAK)
Phiraphat Niensupornphand (THA)

14 June 2024
19:30

Chinese Taipei	8–0	Iran
Yang 2', 25', 26'; Li 5'; Huang 34'; Ho 38'; Chen Y.-s. 41'; Wang T.-k. 58'	Report

Umpires:
Shigeki Kodama (JPN)
Daulet Urmanov (KAZ)

15 June 2024
15:30

Kazakhstan	2–6	China
Zhanat 39'; A. Duisengazy 47'	Report	Di 7'; Li. P 18'; Tan 26'; Li J. 26', 27'; Li K. 44'

Umpires:
Shigeki Kodama (JPN)
Akalanka Ishan Kumara (SRI)

15 June 2024
17:00

Oman	2–1	Iran
T. Bait 44'; Al-Ghadani 52'	Report	Chopaniaminlouei 57'

Umpires:
Thipak Kanabathu (MAS)
Tsai Chang-yu (TPE)

15 June 2024
17:30

Chinese Taipei	7–0	Hong Kong
Li 13'; Wang Y.-a. 18', 47'; Huang 22'; Chang Y.-c. 25'; Ho 52'; Chen Y.-s. 55'	Report

Umpires:
Thonee Tan (SGP)
Yaser Khurshid (PAK)

17 June 2024
09:00

Kazakhstan	2–7	Chinese Taipei
A. Duisengazy 28', 56'	Report	Chang C.-y. 4', 15', 24'; Li 12'; Huang 22'; Wei 43'; Yang 46'

Umpires:
Thonee Tan (SGP)
Akalanka Ishan Kumara (SRI)

17 June 2024
09:30

China	5–3	Oman
Ning 4'; Li P. 18'; Chen X. 28'; Liu 45'; Tan 53'	Report	T. Bait 27'; Al Balushi 42'; Madit 49'

Umpires:
Shigeki Kodama (JPN)
Thipak Kanabathu (MAS)

17 June 2024
19:30

Hong Kong	0–0	Iran
	Report

Umpires:
Gang Chi (CHN)
Tsai Chang-yu (TPE)

18 June 2024
15:30

Chinese Taipei	6–1	Oman
Wei 13', 45', 57'; Ho 25'; Chen M.-h. 32'; Chang C.-y. 42'	Report	Al Hasni 34'

Umpires:
Kenta Uziie (JPN)
Morteza Ahmadi (IRI)

18 June 2024
17:30

Hong Kong	1–1	Kazakhstan
Kwong 60'	Report	A. Duisengazy 57'

Umpires:
Phiraphat Niensupornphand (THA)
Ismail Hossain Liton (BAN)

18 June 2024
19:30

Iran	1–10	China
Saadat 52'	Report	Di 5', 17', 57'; Ning 14', 39'; Mu 25'; Chen X. 33'; Li P. 44'; Yu H. 46', 58'

Umpires:
Mahmood Al Hasani (OMA)
Vincent Chang (HKG)

20 June 2024
09:00

China	6–2	Chinese Taipei
Di 4'; Tan 9'; Mu 27'; Sun 32'; Ning 43'; Zhang X. 49'	Report	Wei 29'; Wang Y.-a. 41'

Umpires:
Phiraphat Niensupornphand (THA)
Vincent Chang (HKG)

20 June 2024
09:30

Iran	4–2	Kazakhstan
Salimi 9'; Saadat 35', 51', 59'	Report	Kuatov 2'; A. Duisengazy 32'

Umpires:
Shigeki Kodama (JPN)
Mahmood Al Hasani (OMA)

20 June 2024
15:00

Oman	6–0	Hong Kong
T. Bait 3', 17', 33'; Madit 8'; Al Balushi 45'; Al Alawi 48'	Report

Umpires:
Thipak Kanabathu (MAS)
Gang Chi (CHN)

== Fifth to eleventh place classification ==
=== Bracket ===
Cross-over
22 June
Sri Lanka	2
Kazakhstan	9

Ninth place
23 June
Hong Kong	1
Kazakhstan	5

=== Ninth and eleventh place ===
22 June 2024
09:30

Sri Lanka	2–9	Kazakhstan
Mohomed 4'; Gunawardana 50'	Report	A. Duisengazy 4', 9', 12', 38'; Aitkaliyev 5'; Pirmanov 10'; Aslanluly 11', 20'; Zhanat 44'

Umpires:
Mahmood Al Hasani (OMA)
Thonee Tan (SGP)

=== Ninth and tenth place ===
23 June 2024
09:00

Hong Kong	1–5	Kazakhstan
Kwong 52'	Report	Kairatuly 7'; Aitkaliyev 20'; A. Duisengazy 22', 27'; Aslanluly 33'

Umpires:
Shigeki Kodama (JPN)
Phiraphat Niensupornphand (THA)

=== Seventh and eighth place ===
22 June 2024
19:30

Singapore	1–2	Iran
Yap 15'	Report	Ghorbani 30'; Saadat 49'

Umpires:
Thipak Kanabathu (MAS)
Ismail Hossain Liton (BAN)

=== Fifth and sixth place ===
22 June 2024
15:00

Indonesia	3–5	Oman
Wibowo 12', 49'; Raditya 34'	Report	Madit 8', 16', 23'; Al Hasni 22', 56'

Umpires:
Yaser Khurshid (PAK)
Gang Chi (CHN)

== First to fourth place classification ==
=== Bracket ===
Semi-finals
22 June
Bangladesh	5
Chinese Taipei	1
22 June
China	4
Thailand	0

Final
23 June
Bangladesh	4
China	2
Third place
23 June
Chinese Taipei	2 (2)
Thailand (s.o.)	2 (3)

=== Semi-finals ===
22 June 2024
16:30

Bangladesh	5–1	Chinese Taipei
Joy 5'; A. Islam 16', 31'; Abdullah 23', 58'	Report	Wei 5'

Umpires:
Phiraphat Niensupornphand (THA)
Kenta Uziie (JPN)

22 June 2024
19:00

China	4–0	Thailand
Ning 18', 35', 50'; Sun 23'	Report

Umpires:
Shigeki Kodama (JPN)
Vincent Chang (HKG)

=== Third and fourth place ===
23 June 2024
15:00

Chinese Taipei	2–2	Thailand
Wang Y.-a. 27'; Wei 33'	Report	Hayseeda-Oh 38'; Phumee 45'
Penalties
Li (penalty shoot-out missed); Wei (penalty shoot-out scored); Chang C.-y. (penalty shoot-out scored); Chen Y.-s. (penalty shoot-out missed); Ho (penalty shoot-out missed)	2–3	(penalty shoot-out scored) Thawichat; (penalty shoot-out missed) Samarng; (penalty shoot-out scored) Deesa; (penalty shoot-out missed) Chaimanee; (penalty shoot-out scored) Phumee

Umpires:
Kenta Uziie (JPN)
Gang Chi (CHN)

=== Final ===
23 June 2024
18:30

Bangladesh	4–2	China
Hasan 22', 27'; A. Islam 25'; Joy 53'	Report	Luo 33'; Chen X. 41'

Umpires:
Yaser Khurshid (PAK)
Thipak Kanabathu (MAS)

== Final standings ==
Pos	Team	Qualification
1	Bangladesh	2024 Junior Asia Cup
2	China	2024 Junior Asia Cup
3	Thailand	2024 Junior Asia Cup
4	Chinese Taipei	2024 Junior Asia Cup
5	Oman	2024 Junior Asia Cup
6	Indonesia	
7	Iran	
8	Singapore (H)	
9	Kazakhstan	
10	Hong Kong	
11	Sri Lanka	

Source: FIH
(H) Host

== Goalscorers ==
There were 185 goals scored in 33 matches, for an average of 5.61 goals per match.

12 goals

- (Kazakhstan) Agymtay Duisengazy

10 goals

- (Bangladesh) Amirul Islam

8 goals

- (Oman) Aiman Madit

7 goals

- (China) Ning Donjun
- (Chinese Taipei) Wei Cheng-ze

6 goals

- (China) Di Yanwei
- (Oman) Talil Bait

5 goals

- (Bangladesh) Md Abdullah
- (Iran) Mohammad Reza Saadat

4 goals

- (China) Tan Rushi
- (Chinese Taipei) Chang Chun-yu
- (Chinese Taipei) Wang Yo-an
- (Chinese Taipei) Yang Li-an
- (Indonesia) Arthur Wibowo

3 goals

- (Bangladesh) Methushel Fernando
- (Bangladesh) Rakibul Hasan
- (Bangladesh) Obidul Joy
- (China) Chen Xianzhen
- (China) Li Pengfei
- (China) Mu Pengbo
- (China) Sun Jingran
- (China) Yu Haiyang
- (Chinese Taipei) Ho Kai-heng
- (Chinese Taipei) Huang Lin-yu
- (Chinese Taipei) Li Chi-hsuan
- (Kazakhstan) Mukhammed Aslanluly
- (Oman) Alhussin Al Hasni
- (Singapore) Wee Lee Yap

2 goals

- (Bangladesh) Shimul Islam
- (China) Li Junjie
- (Chinese Taipei) Chen Yung-sheng
- (Hong Kong) Kwong Wing Shun
- (Indonesia) Derangga Raditya
- (Kazakhstan) Altynbek Aitkaliyev
- (Kazakhstan) Arsen Zhanat
- (Oman) Hudhaifa Al Balushi
- (Sri Lanka) Udesh Abeygunawardana
- (Thailand) Pichet Chaimanee
- (Thailand) Arfis Hayseeda-Oh
- (Thailand) Kritsana Phumee
- (Thailand) Kraiwich Thawichat

1 goal

- (Bangladesh) Yuneth Ayuka
- (Bangladesh) Hozifa Hossain
- (Bangladesh) Din Islam
- (Bangladesh) Rahid Jibon
- (Bangladesh) Mehrab Hasan Samin M M
- (Bangladesh) Aman Shorif
- (China) Li Kai
- (China) Liu Chao
- (China) Zhang Xuwen
- (China) Luo Jialong
- (Chinese Taipei) Chang Yu-cheng
- (Chinese Taipei) Chen Mu-hung
- (Chinese Taipei) Wang Teng-kuan
- (Indonesia) Shibran Adzami
- (Indonesia) Yuan Jodie
- (Iran) Shayan Chopaniaminlouei
- (Iran) Hassan Ghorbani
- (Iran) Mahdi Salimi
- (Kazakhstan) Yerali Kairatuly
- (Kazakhstan) Azat Kuatov
- (Kazakhstan) Tileukabyl Pirmanov
- (Oman) Rashid Al Alawi
- (Oman) Ali Al-Ghadani
- (Oman) Alkhoder Al-Noufali
- (Sri Lanka) Sachintha Gunawardana
- (Sri Lanka) Mahdhi Mohomed
- (Sri Lanka) Kushan Rathnasooriya
- (Sri Lanka) Lakruwan Ravindu
- (Thailand) Kritsada Chueamkaew
- (Thailand) Worawut Kaeochianghwang
- (Thailand) Nopphadon Samarng

== See also ==
- 2024 Women's Junior AHF Cup
