= 2014 Men's Junior AHF Cup =

Field hockey tournament

Tournament details
- Host country: Bangladesh
- City: Dhaka
- Dates: 30 November – 7 December
- Teams: 5 (from 1 confederation)
- Venue: Maulana Bhasani Hockey Stadium

Final positions
- Champions: Bangladesh (1st title)
- Runner-up: Oman
- Third place: Chinese Taipei

Tournament statistics
- Matches played: 12
- Goals scored: 75 (6.25 per match)
- Top scorer: (Bangladesh) Khorshadur Rahman (10 goals)

The 2014 Men's Junior AHF Cup was the fourth edition of the Men's Junior AHF Cup, the qualification tournament for the Men's Hockey Junior Asia Cup organized by the Asian Hockey Federation.

It was held at the Maulana Bhasani Hockey Stadium in Dhaka, Bangladesh from 30 November to 7 December 2014. Bangladesh won the tournament for the first time and qualified together with Oman for the 2015 Junior Asia Cup.

== Teams ==
The following five teams participated in the tournament.

- Bangladesh
- Chinese Taipei
- Oman
- Sri Lanka
- Thailand

== Results ==
=== Group stage ===
Pos	Team	Pld	W	D	L	GF	GA	GD	Pts	Qualification
1	Bangladesh (H)	4	4	0	0	31	0	+31	12	Final and 2015 Junior Asia Cup
2	Oman	4	2	1	1	11	10	+1	7	Final and 2015 Junior Asia Cup
3	Chinese Taipei	4	2	1	1	9	13	−4	7	Third place game
4	Sri Lanka	4	1	0	3	8	16	−8	3	Third place game
5	Thailand	4	0	0	4	4	24	−20	0	

Source: FIH
(H) Hosts

30 November 2014
14:30

Sri Lanka	3–4	Chinese Taipei
Kasan 10'; Pramudya 28'; Shahid 70+'	Report	Wu Po 19', 40'; Lu Yu 51'; Hsu Ching-chieh 55'

Umpires:
Mahmood Hasani (OMA)
Shahbaz Ali (BAN)

1 December 2014
12:30

Oman	7–0	Thailand
M. Al-Hasani 3', 60'; Al-Balushi 42'; Al-Nofali 44'; Al-Hosni 52'; Bait Barakh 56'; I. Al-Hasani 60'; Al-Shatari 65'	Report

Umpires:
Shahbaz Ali (BAN)
Chung Teng-wei (TPE)

1 December 2014
15:00

Bangladesh	7–0	Chinese Taipei
Korshadur 28', 46'; Mainul 41', 52'; Farhad 44', 50'; Milon 55'	Report

Umpires:
Ilanggo Kanabathu (MAS)
Mohomead Nawshad (SRI)

2 December 2014
15:00

Bangladesh	10–0	Thailand
Sarower 3'; Khorshadur 7', 11', 23'; Milon 21', 41', 57'; Mainul 39', 48'; Roman 44'	Report

Umpires:
Ilanggo Kanabathu (MAS)
Mahmood Hasani (OMA)

3 December 2014
12:30

Chinese Taipei	4–2	Thailand
Lu Yu 11'; Kuo Chun-kai 24'; Shih Chung 26'; Wu Po 48'	Report	Aphiwat 28'; Borirak 68'

Umpires:
Mohomead Nawshad (SRI)
Shahbaz Ali (BAN)

3 December 2014
15:00

Sri Lanka	2–3	Oman
Shahid 23'; Saminda 50'	Report	Al-Nofali 10', 21'; Al-Hosni 32'

Umpires:
Suwith Yooyuen (THA)
Chung Teng-wei (TPE)

4 December 2014
12:30

Thailand	2–3	Sri Lanka
Chakan 24'; Sombat 59'	Report	Surendra 9'; Pramudya 14'; Akalanka 47'

Umpires:
Mahmood Hasani (OMA)
Chung Teng-wei (TPE)

4 December 2014
15:00

Bangladesh	7–0	Oman
Khorshadur 16', 30', 35+'; Mainul 20'; Milon 23'; Sarower 50'; Rabbi 69'	Report

Umpires:
Ilanggo Kanabathu (MAS)
Suwith Yooyuen (THA)

6 December 2014
11:30

Oman	1–1	Chinese Taipei
M. Al-Hasani 65'	Report	Huang Tzu-yu 45'

Umpires:
Mohomead Nawshad (SRI)
Shahbaz Ali (BAN)

6 December 2014
14:00

Sri Lanka	0–7	Bangladesh
	Report	Milon 13'; Mainul 17'; Ashraful 23'; Fazla 28'; Roman 44', 64'; Arshad 48'

Umpires:
Yooyuen Suwith (THA)
Ilanggo Kanabathu (MAS)

=== Classification round ===
==== Third and fourth place ====
7 December 2014
11:30

Chinese Taipei	6–2	Sri Lanka
Huang Tzu-yu 22'; Chen Hsi-gfan 37'; Yen Li 46'; Wu Po 49'; Shih Tsung-jen 52', 58'	Report	Budharaka 14'; Shahid 63'

Umpires:
Shahbaz Ali (BAN)
Suwith Yooyuen (THA)

==== Final ====
7 December 2014
14:30

Bangladesh	4–0	Oman
Khorshadur 16', 37'; Ashraful 24'; Sarower 50'	Report

Umpires:
Ilanggo Kanabathu (MAS)
Mohomead Nawshad (SRI)

== Statistics ==
=== Final standings ===
Pos	Team	Qualification
1	Bangladesh (H)	2015 Junior Asia Cup
2	Oman	2015 Junior Asia Cup
3	Chinese Taipei	
4	Sri Lanka	
5	Thailand	

Source: FIH
(H) Host

=== Goalscorers ===
There were 75 goals scored in 12 matches, for an average of 6.25 goals per match.

10 goals

- (Bangladesh) Korshadur Rahman

6 goals

- (Bangladesh) Milon Hossain
- (Bangladesh) Mainul Islam

4 goals

- (Chinese Taipei) Wu Po

3 goals

- (Bangladesh) Sarower Hossain
- (Bangladesh) Roman Sarkar
- (Oman) Ahmed Al-Nofali
- (Sri Lanka) Shahid Kuthupdeen

2 goals

- (Bangladesh) Ashraful Islam
- (Bangladesh) Farhad Shetul
- (Chinese Taipei) Huang Tzu-yu
- (Chinese Taipei) Lu Yu
- (Chinese Taipei) Shih Tsung-jen
- (Oman) Muhanna Al-Hasani
- (Oman) Rashid Al-Hosni
- (Sri Lanka) Pramudya Fernando

1 goal

- (Bangladesh) Arshad Hossain
- (Bangladesh) Fazla Rabby
- (Bangladesh) Rabbi Salehin
- (Chinese Taipei) Chen Hsi-fan
- (Chinese Taipei) Hsu Ching-chieh
- (Chinese Taipei) Kuo Chun-kai
- (Chinese Taipei) Shih Chung
- (Chinese Taipei) Yen Li
- (Oman) Khalid Al-Balushi
- (Oman) Imad Al-Hasani
- (Oman) Shafi Al-Shatari
- (Oman) Ahmad Bait Barakh
- (Sri Lanka) Saminda De Costa
- (Sri Lanka) Budharaka Edirisinghe
- (Sri Lanka) Akalanka Ishan
- (Sri Lanka) Surendra Jeyendran
- (Sri Lanka) Kasun Ubesiri
- (Thailand) Chakan Boonmee
- (Thailand) Borirak Harapan
- (Thailand) Aphiwat Thanperm
- (Thailand) Sombat Tong-Om

Source: FIH
