= 2024 Men's Hockey Junior Asia Cup =

Field hockey competition in Asia

Tournament details
- Host country: Oman
- City: Muscat
- Dates: 26 November – 4 December
- Teams: 10 (from 1 confederation)
- Venue: Hockey Oman Stadium

Final positions
- Champions: India (5th title)
- Runner-up: Pakistan
- Third place: Japan

Tournament statistics
- Matches played: 29
- Goals scored: 203 (7 per match)
- Top scorer: (Pakistan) Sufyan Khan (12 goals)
- Best player: (India) Araijeet Singh Hundal
- Best young player: (Japan) Yamato Kawahara
- Best goalkeeper: (Malaysia) Rafaizul Saini

The 2024 Men's Hockey Junior Asia Cup was the tenth edition of the Men's Hockey Junior Asia Cup, the men's international under-21 field hockey championship of Asia, organized by the Asian Hockey Federation. It was held from 26 November to 4 December 2024 at the Hockey Oman Stadium in Muscat, Oman.

India were the two-time defending champions. They defended their title by defeating Pakistan 5–3 in the final to clinch their fifth title. Japan won the bronze medal by defeating Malaysia 2–1.

The tournament served as the Asian qualifier for the 2025 Men's FIH Hockey Junior World Cup, with the six highest-ranked teams, besides the 2025 Junior World Cup hosts India, qualifying. Pakistan, Japan, Malaysia, Bangladesh, China and Thailand secured the six qualifying spots. Bangladesh, China and Thailand will debut at the Junior World Cup.

== Qualification ==
The five highest-ranked teams from the 2023 Junior Asia Cup qualified directly for this edition. The other teams participated in the 2024 Men's Junior AHF Cup, where the top five qualified for the 2024 Junior Asia Cup.

=== Qualified teams ===
The following ten teams participated in the 2024 Junior Asia Cup.

Dates	Event	Location	Quotas	Qualifiers
23 May – 1 June 2023	2023 Junior Asia Cup	Salalah, Oman	5	India; Japan; Malaysia; Pakistan; South Korea
14–23 June 2024	2024 Junior AHF Cup	Singapore	5	Bangladesh; China; Chinese Taipei; Oman; Thailand
Total			10	

== Preliminary round ==
All times are local (UTC+4).

=== Pool A ===
Pos	Team	Pld	W	D	L	GF	GA	GD	Pts	Qualification
1	India	4	4	0	0	38	3	+35	12	Semi-finals and 2025 Junior World Cup
2	Japan	4	3	0	1	24	4	+20	9	Semi-finals and 2025 Junior World Cup
3	South Korea	4	2	0	2	16	18	−2	6	
4	Thailand	4	1	0	3	4	26	−22	3	
5	Chinese Taipei	4	0	0	4	6	37	−31	0	

Source: FIH
Rules for classification: 1) points; 2) matches won; 3) goal difference; 4) goals for; 5) head-to-head result; 6) field goals for.

26 November 2024
12:15

South Korea	6–2	Thailand
Lee G. 14'; Choi Y. 18'; Lim J. 23'; Hong D. 38', 49'; Park J. 43'	Report	Chaimanee 8'; Phumee 60'

Umpires:
Mohd Ismady Alib (MAS)
Jin Nan (CHN)

26 November 2024
14:30

Japan	11–0	Chinese Taipei
Yamada 8', 10'; Sasaki 21'; T. Tanaka 21', 24', 55'; Shinohara 26', 40'; Fujiwara 36', 41'; Sato 53'	Report

Umpires:
Mazin Al-Shukaili (OMA)
Rashed Hasan Rony (BAN)

27 November 2024
12:15

South Korea	9–6	Chinese Taipei
Hong D. 4'; Noh W. 4'; Kim D. 27'; Lee G. 35', 49'; Choi S. 36', 51'; Park J. 54', 58'	Report	Wei C. 19', 34', 59'; Wang Y. 26'; Wang T. 32'; Chang C. 43'

Umpires:
Hashim Al-Shatri (OMA)
Thanakrit Boon-art (THA)

27 November 2024
16:45

India	11–0	Thailand
Araijeet 2', 24'; Arshdeep 8'; Sharda 10'; Gurjot 18', 45'; Sourabh 19', 52'; Dilraj 21'; Rohit 29'; Mukesh 59'	Report

Umpires:
Chor Ming Yeung (HKG)
Chung Teng-wei (TPE)

28 November 2024
19:00

Japan	2–3	India
Sato 15', 38'	Report	Thokchom 12'; Rohit 36'; Araijeet 39'

Umpires:
Hisham Moaaz (EGY)
Mazin Al-Shukaili (OMA)

29 November 2024
16:45

Chinese Taipei	0–1	Thailand
	Report	Samarng 12'

Umpires:
Rashed Hasan Rony (BAN)
Hashim Al Shatri (OMA)

30 November 2024
12:15

Japan	2–0	South Korea
Yamanaka 6'; Kimura 45'	Report

Umpires:
Mazin Al-Shukaili (OMA)
Mohd Ismady Alib (MAS)

30 November 2024
16:45

India	16–0	Chinese Taipei
Yogember 7'; Dilraj 17', 40', 45', 57'; Sourabh 20', 28', 58'; Rosan 23', 32', 42'; Priyobarta 31'; Arshdeep 37', 44'; Sharda 39'; Araijeet 54'	Report

Umpires:
Mazhar Waseem (PAK)
Jin Nan (CHN)

1 December 2024
12:15

Thailand	1–9	Japan
Chueamkaew 18'	Report	Watanabe 5'; Kimura 15'; T. Tanaka 15', 24'; Higuchi 16', 36'; Nakajima 21'; Fujiwara 34'; Shinohara 57'

Umpires:
Rashed Hasan Rony (BAN)
Hashim Al-Shatri (OMA)

1 December 2024
19:00

South Korea	1–8	India
Kim T. 18'	Report	Araijeet 3', 37'; Arshdeep 9', 44', 60'; Gurjot 11'; Rosan 27'; Rohit 30'

=== Pool B ===
Pos	Team	Pld	W	D	L	GF	GA	GD	Pts	Qualification
1	Pakistan	4	4	0	0	24	3	+21	12	Semi-finals and 2025 Junior World Cup
2	Malaysia	4	2	1	1	17	9	+8	7	Semi-finals and 2025 Junior World Cup
3	Bangladesh	4	1	2	1	6	10	−4	5	
4	China	4	1	1	2	12	15	−3	4	
5	Oman (H)	4	0	0	4	4	26	−22	0	

Source: FIH
Rules for classification: 1) points; 2) matches won; 3) goal difference; 4) goals for; 5) head-to-head result; 6) field goals for.
(H) Hosts

26 November 2024
16:45

Malaysia	5–2	China
Che 17'; Jamlus 34'; Norizam 43'; Naaveennash 44'; Danial 59'	Report	Wang Y. 5'; Zhang J. 46'

Umpires:
Hisham Moaaz (EGY)
Suraj Dubey (IND)

26 November 2024
19:00

Bangladesh	3–1	Oman
Hassan 7'; Hasan 37', 38'	Report	Al Wahaibi 55'

Umpires:
Chor Ming Yeung (HKG)
Kim Ji-yong (KOR)

27 November 2024
14:30

Pakistan	7–2	China
Fayyaz 17', 23'; Khan 22', 50'; Ammad 43'; Rana 46'; Muhammad 51'	Report	Di Y. 24'; Wang Y. 59'

Umpires:
Mohd Ismady Alib (MAS)
Mazhar Waseem (PAK)

27 November 2024
19:00

Malaysia	9–1	Oman
Osman 1', 11', 31', 40'; Naaveennash 6', 12'; Handzalah 24'; Aiman 35'; Che 54'	Report	Qasmi 39'

Umpires:
Kim Ji-yong (KOR)
Kenta Uziie (JPN)

28 November 2024
16:45

Bangladesh	0–6	Pakistan
	Report	Khan 23', 32', 43'; Ammad 23'; Rana 51'; Hayat 60'

Umpires:
Kenta Uziie (JPN)
Suraj Dubey (IND)

29 November 2024
19:00

Oman	2–7	China
Al Hasni 15'; Bait 21'	Report	Tan R. 3'; Wang Y. 7', 24', 52', 59'; Ning D. 30'; Sun J. 40'

Umpires:
Chor Ming Yeung (HKG)
Thanakrit Boon-art (THA)

30 November 2024
14:30

Bangladesh	2–2	Malaysia
Islam 27'; Hasan 36'	Report	Danial 2'; Norizam 40'

Umpires:
Kim Ji-yong (KOR)
Chung Teng-wei (TPE)

30 November 2024
19:00

Pakistan	7–0	Oman
Shahid 2'; Rana 14', 34'; Abdul 26'; Ali 33'; Nadeem 49'; Khan 57'	Report

Umpires:
Hisham Moaaz (EGY)
Suraj Dubey (IND)

1 December 2024
14:30

China	1–1	Bangladesh
Wang Y. 45'	Report	Ali 41'

Umpires:
Kim Ji-yong (KOR)
Chung Teng-wei (TPE)

1 December 2024
16:45

Malaysia	1–4	Pakistan
Ashraf 23'	Report	Khan 3', 35', 58'; Abdul 51'

Umpires:
Hisham Moaaz (EGY)
Kenta Uziie (JPN)

== Fifth to tenth place classification ==
=== Bracket ===
5–8 place
3 December
Bangladesh	7
Thailand	2
3 December
South Korea	3
China	4

Fifth place
4 December
Bangladesh	6
China	3
Seventh place
4 December
Thailand (s.o.)	2 (3)
South Korea	2 (2)

=== Ninth and tenth place ===
3 December 2024
09:00

Chinese Taipei	1–1	Oman
Wang T. 3'	Report	Al Balushi 15'
Penalties
Wei C. (penalty shoot-out scored); Chiu T. (penalty shoot-out scored); Huang L. (penalty shoot-out missed); Li C. (penalty shoot-out missed); Chang C. (penalty shoot-out missed)	2–3	(penalty shoot-out scored) Madit; (penalty shoot-out scored) Bait; (penalty shoot-out scored) Al Wahaibi; (penalty shoot-out missed) Al Noufali

Umpires:
Rashed Hasan Rony (BAN)
Jin Nan (CHN)

=== 5–8th place semi-finals ===
3 December 2024
11:30

Bangladesh	7–2	Thailand
Joy 3', 39'; Islam 6'; Abdullah 16', 49'; Hasan 34'; Khan 36'	Report	Chueamkaew 30+'; Phumee 35'

Umpires:
Kenta Uziie (JPN)
Mazhar Waseem (PAK)

3 December 2024
14:00

South Korea	3–4	China
Cho G. 14'; Lee G. 41'; Choi S. 52'	Report	Wang Y. 8', 20'; Luo J. 38'; Li K. 49'

Umpires:
Chor Ming Yeung (HKG)
Mohd Ismady Alib (MAS)

=== Seventh and eighth place ===
4 December 2024
11:30

Thailand	2–2	South Korea
Chaimanee 33'; Phumee 53'	Report	Lee G. 38'; Park J. 43'
Penalties
Thawichat (penalty shoot-out scored); Phokphun (penalty shoot-out missed); Phumee (penalty shoot-out missed); Chueamkaew (penalty shoot-out scored); Chaimanee (penalty shoot-out missed); Chaimanee (penalty shoot-out scored); Sae-aew (penalty shoot-out missed)	3–2	(penalty shoot-out missed) Jin G. (penalty shoot-out scored) Song J. (penalty shoot-out scored) Choi S. (penalty shoot-out missed) Kim D. (penalty shoot-out missed) Park H. (penalty shoot-out missed) Song J.

Umpires:
Hisham Moaaz (EGY)
Mohd Ismady Alib (MAS)

=== Fifth and sixth place ===
4 December 2024
14:00

Bangladesh	6–3	China
Hasan 1', 52', 60'; Islam 21', 26', 30+'	Report	Chen Z. 11'; Zhang J. 19', 42'

Umpires:
Suraj Dubey (IND)
Thanakrit Boon-art (THA)

== First to fourth place classification ==
=== Bracket ===
Semi-finals
3 December
Pakistan	4
Japan	2
3 December
India	3
Malaysia	1

Final
4 December
Pakistan	3
India	5
Third place
4 December
Japan	2
Malaysia	1

=== Semi-finals ===
3 December 2024
16:30

Pakistan	4–2	Japan
Shahid 27', 48'; Ali 38'; Khan 52'	Report	T. Tanaka 30'; R. Yamanaka 41'

Umpires:
Suraj Dubey (IND)
Hisham Moaaz (EGY)

3 December 2024
19:00

India	3–1	Malaysia
Dilraj 10'; Rohit 45'; Sharda 52'	Report	Kamaruddin 57'

Umpires:
Mazin Al-Shukaili (OMA)
Kim Ji-yong (KOR)

=== Third and fourth place ===
4 December 2024
16:30

Japan	2–1	Malaysia
T. Tanaka 7'; Fujiwara 9'	Report	Osman 23'

Umpires:
Kim Ji-yong (KOR)
Mazhar Waseem (PAK)

=== Final ===
4 December 2024
19:00

Pakistan	3–5	India
Shahid 3'; Khan 30', 39'	Report	Araijeet 4', 18', 47', 54'; Dilraj 19'

Umpires:
Mazin Al-Shukaili (OMA)
Chor Ming Yeung (HKG)

== Statistics ==
=== Final standings ===
Pos	Team	Qualification
1st place, gold medalist(s)	India (Note: India already qualified for the 2025 Junior World Cup as hosts.)	2025 Junior World Cup
2nd place, silver medalist(s)	Pakistan	
3rd place, bronze medalist(s)	Japan	2025 Junior World Cup
4	Malaysia	2025 Junior World Cup
5	Bangladesh	2025 Junior World Cup
6	China	2025 Junior World Cup
7	Thailand	
8	South Korea	2025 Junior World Cup
9	Oman (H)	2025 Junior World Cup
10	Chinese Taipei	

Source: FIH
(H) Host

=== Awards ===
The following awards were given at the conclusion of the tournament:

Player of the Tournament	Goalkeeper of the Tournament	Leading Goalscorer	Rising Player of the Tournament
(India) Araijeet Singh Hundal	(Malaysia) Rafaizul Saini	(Pakistan) Sufyan Khan	(Japan) Yamato Kawahara

=== Goalscorers ===
There were 203 goals scored in 29 matches, for an average of 7 goals per match.

12 goals

- (Pakistan) Sufyan Khan

10 goals

- (India) Araijeet Singh Hundal

9 goals

- (China) Wang Yubo

7 goals

- (Bangladesh) Md Hasan
- (India) Arshdeep Singh
- (India) Dilraj Singh
- (Japan) Tsubasa Tanaka

5 goals

- (Bangladesh) Amirul Islam
- (India) Sourabh Anand Kushwaha
- (South Korea) Lee Gyu-jin
- (Malaysia) Harris Osman

4 goals

- (India) Rosan Kujur
- (India) Rohit
- (Japan) Yuma Fujiwara
- (South Korea) Park Jae-won
- (Pakistan) Waleed Rana
- (Pakistan) Hannan Shahid

3 goals

- (China) Zhang Jialing
- (Chinese Taipei) Wei Cheng-ze
- (India) Gurjot Singh
- (India) Sharda Nand Tiwari
- (Japan) Neo Sato
- (Japan) Ryosuke Shinohara
- (South Korea) Hong Dae-cheon
- (South Korea) Choi Seong-jin
- (Malaysia) S Naaveennash
- (Thailand) Kritsana Phumee

2 goals

- (Bangladesh) Md Joy
- (Bangladesh) Md Abdullah
- (Chinese Taipei) Wang Teng-kuan
- (Japan) Hyota Yamada
- (Japan) Naru Kimura
- (Japan) Yuto Higuchi
- (Malaysia) Nur Aqilrullah Che
- (Malaysia) Muhammad Danish Danial
- (Malaysia) Muhammad Norizam
- (Pakistan) Hamza Fayyaz
- (Pakistan) Muhammad Ammad
- (Pakistan) Qayyum Abdul
- (Pakistan) Basharat Ali
- (Thailand) Kritsada Chueamkaew
- (Thailand) Pichet Chaimenee

1 goal

- (Bangladesh) Md Hassan
- (Bangladesh) Md Ali
- (Bangladesh) Md Khan
- (China) Di Yanwei
- (China) Tan Rushi
- (China) Ning Dongjun
- (China) Sun Jingran
- (China) Luo Jialong
- (China) Li Kai
- (China) Chen Zhenxin
- (Chinese Taipei) Wang Yo-an
- (Chinese Taipei) Chang Chun-yu
- (India) Mukesh Toppo
- (India) Thokchom Kingson Singh
- (India) Yogember Rawat
- (India) Talem Priyobarta
- (Japan) Shogo Sasaki
- (Japan) Atsuki Yamanaka
- (Japan) Jun Watanabe
- (Japan) Jota Nakajima
- (Japan) Rakusei Yamanaka
- (South Korea) Choi Yun-seong
- (South Korea) Lim Jun-yeol
- (South Korea) Noh Won-ho
- (South Korea) Kim Dae-hyun
- (South Korea) Kim Tae-hyeon
- (South Korea) Cho Ghu-hyeong
- (Malaysia) Muhammad Addy Jazmi Jamlus
- (Malaysia) Muhammad Handzalah
- (Malaysia) Muhammad Danish Aiman
- (Malaysia) Adam Ashraf
- (Malaysia) Azimuddin Kamaruddin
- (Oman) Maitham Al Wahaibi
- (Oman) Ahmad Al Qasmi
- (Oman) Alhussin Al Balushi
- (Oman) Talal Bait
- (Oman) Hudhaufa Al Wahaibi
- (Pakistan) Mughira Muhammad
- (Pakistan) Zikriya Hayat
- (Pakistan) Khan Nadeem
- (Thailand) Nopphadon Samarng

Source: FIH

== See also ==
- 2024 Women's Hockey Junior Asia Cup
