= India men's national under-21 field hockey team =

India U21 men
- Association: Hockey India
- Confederation: Asian Hockey Federation
- Head Coach: Fred Soyez
- Captain: Anmol Ekka

FIH ranking
- Current: 4

First international
- Malaysia 2–1 India (Versailles, 23 August 1979)

Last international
- India 4–1 South Korea (Moqi, 13 September 2026)

Biggest win
- India 32–0 Macau (Karachi, December 1988)

Junior World Cup
- Appearances: 12 (first in 1979)
- Best result: (gold) Champions (2001, 2016)

Junior Asia Cup
- Appearances: 11 (first in 1988)
- Best result: (gold) Champions (2004, 2008, 2015, 2023, 2024, 2026)
Medal record
Junior World Cup
Gold medal – first place	2001 Hobart
Gold medal – first place	2016 Lucknow
Silver medal – second place	1997 Milton Keynes
Bronze medal – third place	2025 Tamil Nadu
Junior Asia Cup
Gold medal – first place	2004 Karachi
Gold medal – first place	2008 Hyderabad
Gold medal – first place	2015 Kuantan
Gold medal – first place	2023 Salalah
Gold medal – first place	2024 Muscat
Gold medal – first place	2026 Moqi
Silver medal – second place	1996 Singapore
Silver medal – second place	2000 Kuala Lumpur
Bronze medal – third place	1988 Karachi
Bronze medal – third place	2012 Malacca
Sultan of Johor Cup
Gold medal – first place	2013 Johor
Gold medal – first place	2014 Johor
Gold medal – first place	2022 Johor
Silver medal – second place	2012 Johor
Silver medal – second place	2015 Johor
Silver medal – second place	2018 Johor
Silver medal – second place	2019 Johor
Silver medal – second place	2025 Johor
Bronze medal – third place	2017 Johor
Bronze medal – third place	2023 Johor
Bronze medal – third place	2024 Johor

The India men's national under-21 field hockey team represents India in men's under-21 field hockey competitions. It is governed by Hockey India, the governing body for field hockey in India. They are one of the most successful junior field hockey teams in the world, having won the World Cup twice and Asia Cup six times. India are the reigning World Cup bronze medallists and the Asian Champions, holding the title since 2015. The team is currently ranked 4th in the world and 1st in Asia.

== History ==
India junior team's first recorded international tournament is the inaugural 1979 Junior World Cup, where they finished 5th. They managed to finish 5th in the 1982 and 1985 World Cups consecutively. In the first ever Junior Asia Cup in 1988, they settled with a third place bronze and missed the 1989 Junior World Cup spot as only finalists could qualify for the World Cup. After the fourth place finish in 1992 Junior Asia Cup, they also failed to qualify for the 1993 Junior World Cup.

India won silver in the 1996 Junior Asia Cup and made a comeback to the World Cup, qualifying to the 1997 Junior World Cup. India started the 1997 World Cup with a narrow loss against Spain, but won against Netherlands, Cuba and Belgium. A draw with Australia took them to the semi-final, where they defeated Germany by 4–3 in the extra time. In their first World Cup final, against Australia, they lost by a goal margin as 2–3 and added a World Cup silver to their cabinet.

In the 2000 Junior Asia Cup, India won silver and made it to the 2001 Junior World Cup. They started the tournament by winning all the group stage clashes and entered the medal round. India drew with Argentina and lost 1–2 to Australia. In a must win game against Netherlands, India overcame them in a 7 goal thriller and qualified to the final four. In the semi-final against the then 4 time champions, Germany, India won by 3–2, despite conceding two late goals after taking a 3–0 lead. In their second World Cup final, against Argentina, India made history by winning their first ever Junior World Cup with a big 6–1 victory. They held the World champions and the Asian champions titles at the same time, when they won their first Junior Asia Cup in 2004, defeating arch-rivals Pakistan. India started their World title defence in 2005, with topping the group stage and medal round, beating Netherlands, Spain and England. However, they lost to Australia by 2–3 in semi final and missed the bronze against Spain in penalties.

They retained the Asia title in 2008, with a sudden death win over Korea in the final, as Diwakar Ram hit a golden goal through penalty corner. India could not get through the group stage in the 2009 Junior World Cup, but finished as the best in the non-medal round. India participated in the inaugural 2011 Sultan of Johor Cup and finished 4th. At the 2012 Junior Asia Cup, India clinched the bronze, with Akashdeep Singh scoring a golden goal against Korea. India hosted the Junior World Cup for the first time in 2013. The hosts did not qualify to the medal round as they lost to the Dutch and drew Korea, finishing 10th. They became the consecutive title winners of 2013 and 2014 Sultan of Johor Cup. India won their third Asia title in 2015 Junior Asia Cup, thrashing Pakistan 6–2 in the final.

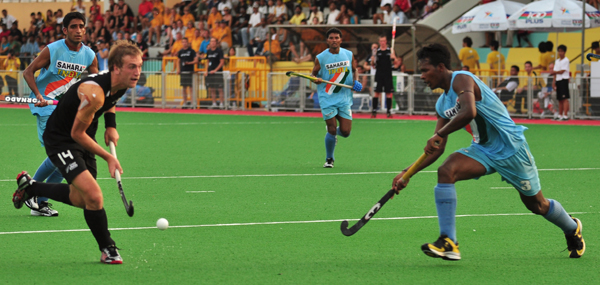
India against New Zealand during the 2009 Men's Hockey Junior World Cup.

Indian team played two matches in the EurAsia Hockey Cup against the Russian club Dynamo-Stroitel and won both by the scorelines 3–1 and 3–2. India hosted the 2016 Junior World Cup, with hosts entered the quarter finals, beating England and South Africa in the group stage. In the quarter final clash against Spain, they trailed 0–1 for the most part of the game until Simranjeet Singh and Harmanpreet Singh gave 2–1 win and a place in the final four. India overcame Australia in the semi final through penalties, as goalkeeper Vikas Dahiya denied two opponents' goals and the hosts faced Belgium in the final. India won the Junior World Cup for the second time after 16 years, as Gurjant Singh and Simranjeet Singh helped in a 2–1 victory.

They missed back to back bronze medals in the 2021 and 2023 Junior World Cups, although qualifying up to the semi-finals in both. India won Junior Asia titles in 2023 and 2024.

India hosted the 2025 Men's FIH Hockey Junior World Cup for the third time. India finished high in the group and entered the knockout stage. The quarter final clash against Belgium went to penalties after 2–2 draw in the regulation time. Indian goal keeper Prince Deep Singh blocked Belgium's last 2 shots as India won 4–3. Germany denied India's way to the final and the hosts met Argentina for the bronze medal. The South Americans were leading 2–0 at the end of the third quarter before Indians found the net four times, in the final 11 minutes to win it 4–2. India extended their Asian title streak by winning the 2026 tournament.

== Tournament record ==
=== Junior World Cup ===
Junior World Cup
Year	Host	Round	Position	Pld	W	D	L	GF	GA
1979	Versailles, France	Group stage	5th	7	5	0	2	25	11
1982	Kuala Lumpur, Malaysia	Group stage	5th	7	5	1	1	32	6
1985	Vancouver, Canada	Group stage	5th	8	5	1	2	23	11
1989	Ipoh, Malaysia	Did not qualify							
1993	Terrassa, Spain	Did not qualify							
1997	Milton Keynes, England	Final	2nd place, silver medalist(s)	7	4	1	2	25	15
2001	Hobart, Australia	Final	1st place, gold medalist(s)	8	6	1	1	31	11
2005	Rotterdam, Netherlands	Semi-finals	4th	8	5	1	2	18	13
2009	Johor Bahru, Malaysia; Singapore	Group stage	9th	8	6	1	1	42	9
2013	New Delhi, India	Group stage	10th	5	2	2	1	13	11
2016	Lucknow, India	Final	1st place, gold medalist(s)	6	5	1	0	17	8
2021	Bhubaneswar, India	Semi-finals	4th	6	3	0	3	29	15
2023	Kuala Lumpur, Malaysia	Semi-finals	4th	6	3	0	3	21	17
2025	Chennai and Madurai, India	Semi-finals	3rd place, bronze medalist(s)	6	4	1	1	36	9
2027	TBD	Qualified							
	Total		2 Titles	82	53	10	19	312	136

Junior World Cup (1985) history
Year	Round	Score	Result
1985	Group A	Netherlands 2–0 India	Loss
1985	Group A	Chile 2–6 India	Win
1985	Group A	Germany 4–3 India	Loss
1985	Group A	India 4–0 Zimbabwe	Win
1985	Group A	India 3–1 Belgium	Win
1985	Group A	India 0–0 Argentina	Draw
1985	5/8	France 0–4 India	Win
1985	5/6	England 2–3 India	Win

=== Junior Asia Cup ===
Junior Asia Cup
Year	Host	Round	Position	Pld	W	D	L	GF	GA
1988 (Note: Complete group-stage results are not available in published official records.)	Karachi, Pakistan	–	3rd place, bronze medalist(s)	3	2	0	1	34	3
1992	Kuala Lumpur, Malaysia	Semi-finals	4th	6	4	1	1	23	6
1996	Singapore	2nd place, silver medalist(s)	Final	6	4	1	1	21	8
2000	Kuala Lumpur, Malaysia	Final	2nd place, silver medalist(s)	7	6	0	1	64	9
2004	Karachi, Pakistan	Final	1st place, gold medalist(s)	6	5	1	0	47	5
2008	Hyderabad, India	Final	1st place, gold medalist(s)	5	5	0	0	17	4
2012	Malacca, Malaysia	Semi-finals	3rd place, bronze medalist(s)	5	3	1	1	18	6
2015	Kuantan, Malaysia	Final	1st place, gold medalist(s)	6	6	0	0	32	9
2021	Dhaka, Bangladesh	Cancelled							
2023	Salalah, Oman	Final	1st place, gold medalist(s)	6	5	1	0	50	4
2024	Muscat, Oman	Final	1st place, gold medalist(s)	6	6	0	0	46	7
2026	Moqi, China	Final	1st place, gold medalist(s)	6	5	1	0	46	8
	Total		6 Titles	62	51	6	5	398	69

Junior Asia Cup (1988–2004) history
Year	Round	Score	Result
1988	Round Robin	India 2–1 China	Win
1988	Round Robin	India 32–0 Macau	Win
1988	Round Robin	South Korea 2–0 India	Loss
1992	Group B	India 4–2 South Korea	Win
1992	Group B	India 4–0 China	Win
1992	Group B	India 2–1 Bangladesh	Win
1992	Group B	India 11–0 Singapore	Win
1992	Semi final	Malaysia 1–0 India	Loss
1992	3/4	South Korea 2–2 (p.s 4–1) India	Draw
1996	Group B	Bangladesh 2–1 India	Loss
1996	Group B	India 3–2 Japan	Win
1996	Group B	India 9–0 Singapore	Win
1996	Group B	India 4–2 Malaysia	Win
1996	Semi final	India 2–0 South Korea	Win
1996	Final	Pakistan 2–2 (p.s 5–4) India	Draw
2000	Group B	India 5–1 Bangladesh	Win
2000	Group B	India 8–1 China	Win
2000	Group B	India 9–2 Japan	Win
2000	Group B	India 22–0 Iran	Win
2000	Group B	India 16–1 Uzbekistan	Win
2000	Semi final	India 2–1 Malaysia	Win
2000	Final	South Korea 3–2 India	Loss
2004	Group B	India 10–0 China	Win
2004	Group B	India 17–1 Sri Lanka	Win
2004	Group B	India 10–0 Bangladesh	Win
2004	Group B	India 5–2 Malaysia	Win
2004	Semi final	India 0–0 (p.s 4–3) South Korea	Draw
2004	Final	India 5–2 Pakistan	Win

=== Other tournaments ===
Sultan of Johor Cup
Year	Host	Position	Pld	W	D	L	GF	GA
2011	Johor Bahru, Malaysia	4th	6	2	0	4	17	20
2012	Johor Bahru, Malaysia	2nd place, silver medalist(s)	6	3	2	1	13	8
2013	Johor Bahru, Malaysia	1st place, gold medalist(s)	6	5	1	0	21	7
2014	Johor Bahru, Malaysia	1st place, gold medalist(s)	6	5	0	1	20	8
2015	Johor Bahru, Malaysia	2nd place, silver medalist(s)	6	4	1	1	16	10
2017	Johor Bahru, Malaysia	3rd place, bronze medalist(s)	6	4	0	2	35	9
2018	Johor Bahru, Malaysia	2nd place, silver medalist(s)	6	4	0	2	19	12
2019	Johor Bahru, Malaysia	2nd place, silver medalist(s)	6	3	1	2	24	14
2022	Johor Bahru, Malaysia	1st place, gold medalist(s)	6	2	3	1	25	19
2023	Johor Bahru, Malaysia	3rd place, bronze medalist(s)	5	2	2	1	18	15
2024	Johor Bahru, Malaysia	3rd place, bronze medalist(s)	6	3	2	1	19	17
2025	Johor Bahru, Malaysia	2nd place, silver medalist(s)	6	3	1	2	15	14
	Total	3 Titles	71	40	13	18	242	153

== Honours ==
=== Major tournaments ===
- Junior World Cup:
  - (gold) Champions: 2001, 2016
  - (silver) Runner-up: 1997
  - (bronze) Third Place: 2025
- Junior Asia Cup:
  - (gold) Champions: 2004, 2008, 2015, 2023, 2024, 2026
  - (silver) Runner-up: 1996, 2000
  - (bronze) Third Place: 1988, 2012

=== Other tournaments ===
- Sultan of Johor Cup:
  - (gold) Champions: 2013, 2014, 2022
  - (silver) Runner-up: 2012, 2015, 2018, 2019, 2025
  - (bronze) Third Place: 2017, 2023, 2024

== Current squad ==
The following Indian junior men's team named for the 2026 Junior Asia Cup, that held at Moqi, China from 4 to 13 September 2026

Head coach: (France) Fred Soyez

Players, caps and goals updated as of 13 September 2026.

No.	Pos.	Player	Date of birth (age)	Caps	Goals	Club
88	GK	Kunal Tewatia	3 August 2008 (age 18)	5		
18	GK	Vivek Lakra	16 December 2007 (age 18)	5		
35	DF	Anmol Ekka (Captain)	30 January 2006 (age 20)	30	22	
7	DF	Chirag	19 April 2008 (age 18)	6		
38	DF	Ashu Maurya	14 July 2007 (age 19)	6	3	
26	DF	Ravinder	1 September 2006 (age 20)	1		
15	DF	Rohit Kullu	15 May 2007 (age 19)	6		
5	DF	Sanjit Tirkey	27 February 2006 (age 20)	6		
6	DF	Sukhvinder	14 May 2006 (age 20)	22	1	
60	MF	Adrohit Ekka	31 October 2006 (age 20)	18		
4	MF	Harpal	8 August 2007 (age 19)	6	3	
31	MF	Jeetpal	31 July 2006 (age 20)	6		
24	MF	Manmeet Singh Rai	10 December 2007 (age 18)	6		
16	MF	Ritik Lakra	15 April 2008 (age 18)			
25	FW	Ajeet Yadav	31 October 2008 (age 18)	18	9	
30	FW	Arjun Hargude	30 April 2007 (age 19)	5	1	
14	FW	Aryan Xess	7 May 2006 (age 20)	6	4	
9	FW	Gursewak Singh	14 December 2006 (age 19)	6	2	
27	FW	Lovenoor Singh	21 March 2006 (age 20)	6	1	
11	FW	Prabhdeep Singh	30 November 2006 (age 19)	6	8	

== Coaching staff ==
Position	Name
Head Coach	(France) Fred Soyez
Team Manager	(India) Janardhana Chowdlu Babu
Strength and Conditioning Coach	(India) Yashwin Shetty
Video Analyst	(India) Ashok Kumar Chinnasamy
Head Physiotherapist	(India) Sarath Lal PV
Masseuse	(India) Ugin Antony

== Results and fixtures ==
The following is a list of match results in the last 12 months, as well as any future matches that have been scheduled.

Win Draw Loss Fixture

=== 2026 ===
All times are in IST (UTC+5:30).

7 July 2026 Practice Match 1	Austria	4–2	India	Wavre, Belgium
21:30		Report		Stadium: Belfius Hockey Arena

8 July 2026 Practice Match 2	Austria	1–4	India	Wavre, Belgium
14:30		Report		Stadium: Belfius Hockey Arena

10 July 2026 Practice Match 3	Belgium	3–2	India	Wavre, Belgium
18:30		Report		Stadium: Belfius Hockey Arena

13 July 2026 Practice Match 4	Germany	1–0	India	Wavre, Belgium
15:30		Report		Stadium: Belfius Hockey Arena

14 July 2026 Practice Match 5	Belgium	4–2	India	Wavre, Belgium
14:30		Report		Stadium: Belfius Hockey Arena

17 July 2026 Practice Match 6	Netherlands	3–4	India	Antwerp, Belgium
18:30		Report		Stadium: Wilrijkse Plein Antwerp

7 August 2026 Practice Match 1	India	3–2	Malaysia	Bengaluru, India
16:00	A. Ekka ?', ?', ?'	Report	Syazwan ?' ?'	Stadium: SAI Netaji Subhas Southern Centre

8 August 2026 Practice Match 2	India	4–3	Malaysia	Bengaluru, India
18:00	A. Ekka ?', ?'; Jeetpal ?'; Prabhdeep ?'	Report		Stadium: SAI Netaji Subhas Southern Centre

10 August 2026 Practice Match 3	India	5–3	Malaysia	Bengaluru, India
10:00	Arun ?'; Nitin ?'; Arjun ?'; R. Ekka ?'; Manimaran ?'	Report		Stadium: SAI Netaji Subhas Southern Centre

12 August 2026 Practice Match 4	India	5–1	Malaysia	Bengaluru, India
14:00	Prabhdeep ?', ?'; Ashu ?', ?'; Arjun ?'	Report		Stadium: SAI Netaji Subhas Southern Centre

13 August 2026 Practice Match 5	India	4–3	Malaysia	Bengaluru, India
14:00	Arjun ?'; Prabhdeep ?'; Ashu ?'; Harpal ?'	Report		Stadium: SAI Netaji Subhas Southern Centre

28 August 2026 Friendly Match 1	China	3–4	India	Dalian, China

30 August 2026 Friendly Match 2	China	6–6	India	Dalian, China

31 August 2026 Friendly Match 3	China	2–8	India	Dalian, China

5 September 2026 2026 Junior Asia Cup Pool A	India	14–0	Indonesia	Moqi, China
06:30	Prabhdeep 5', 26', 30', 45', 52'; Harpal 8'; Ekka 16', 35', 42', 51'; Ajeet 20', 53', 53'; Maurya 59'	Report		Stadium: Moqi Training Base

6 September 2026 2026 Junior Asia Cup Pool A	Japan	3–3	India	Moqi, China
08:30	Sasaki 11'; Nakanishi 48', 59'	Report	Ekka 4', 60'; Maurya 10'	Stadium: Moqi Training Base

8 September 2026 2026 Junior Asia Cup Pool A	South Korea	3–7	India	Moqi, China
06:30	Choi 6'; Yoo 19', 36'	Report	Ekka 5', 56'; Lovenoor 18'; Ajeet 20'; Prabhdeep 42'; Gursewak 55'; Xess 58'	Stadium: Moqi Training Base

9 September 2026 2026 Junior Asia Cup Pool A	India	15–0	Chinese Taipei	Moqi, China
06:30	Xess 17', 52', 53'; Prabhdeep 18'; Gursewak 22'; Ekka 25', 29', 32', 33', 45', 51'; Hargude 28'; Ajeet 35'; Harpal 48', 53'	Report		Stadium: Moqi Training Base

11 September 2026 2026 Junior Asia Cup Semi final	India	3–1	Malaysia	Moqi, China
14:15	Ekka 16', 54'; Sukhvinder 51'	Report	M Rahuul 60'	Stadium: Moqi Training Base

13 September 2026 2026 Junior Asia Cup Gold medal match	India	4–1	South Korea	Moqi, China
16:15	Ajeet 9'; Ekka 13'; Prabhdeep 21'; Maurya 50'	Report	Lee 54'	Stadium: Moqi Training Base

== Head-to-head record ==
Won more matches than lost
All matches drawn
Won equal matches to lost
Lost more matches than won

=== Overall record ===
Record last updated as of the following match:

India vs South Korea at Moqi Training Base, Moqi in the 2026 Junior Asia Cup, 13 September 2026

Opponent	GP	W	D	L	Win %	Last meeting
Argentina	8	6	2	0	75%	2025
Australia	19	5	4	10	26.32%	2025
Bangladesh	5	4	0	1	80%	2004
Belgium	7	5	1	1	71.43%	2025
Canada	6	6	0	0	100%	2023
Chile	3	3	0	0	100%	2025
China	6	6	0	0	100%	2015
Chinese Taipei	3	3	0	0	100%	2026
Cuba	1	1	0	0	100%	1997
Egypt	1	1	0	0	100%	2005
England	6	6	0	0	100%	2023
France	4	2	0	2	50%	2021
Germany	15	6	1	8	40%	2025
Great Britain	13	3	3	7	23.08%	2025
Hong Kong	1	1	0	0	100%	1981
Indonesia	1	1	0	0	100%	2026
Ireland	1	1	0	0	100%	1979
Iran	1	1	0	0	100%	2000
Japan	14	12	1	1	85.71%	2026
Kenya	1	1	0	0	100%	1982
Macau	1	1	0	0	100%	1988
Malaysia	24	18	2	4	75.00%	2026
Netherlands	11	6	0	5	54.55%	2023
New Zealand	12	8	3	1	66.67%	2025
Oman	3	3	0	0	100%	2025
Pakistan	18	9	8	1	50%	2025
Poland	4	4	0	0	100%	2021
Scotland	1	1	0	0	100%	2001
Singapore	5	5	0	0	100%	2009
South Africa	2	1	0	1	50%	2022
South Korea	21	12	3	6	57.14%	2026
Spain	13	6	1	6	46.15%	2023
Sri Lanka	2	2	0	0	100%	2012
Switzerland	1	1	0	0	100%	2025
Thailand	3	3	0	0	100%	2024
Uzbekistan	1	1	0	0	100%	2000
Zimbabwe	1	1	0	0	100%	1985

=== India Pakistan rivalry ===
India lead the head-to-head record against Pakistan, with 9 wins from 18 matches, compared with Pakistan's 1 wins and 8 draws.

The following table shows India vs Pakistan in major tournaments :

Tournament	Year	Venue	Winning team, result
Junior World Cup	2013	(India) New Delhi	Draw 1–1, Pakistan won (p.s.o) 4–2
Junior World Cup Asian Qualifiers	1988	(India) New Delhi	Pakistan, 2–1
Men's Hockey Junior Asia Cup	1996	Singapore	Draw 2–2, Pakistan won (p.s) 5–4
Men's Hockey Junior Asia Cup	2004	(Pakistan) Karachi	India, 5–2
Men's Hockey Junior Asia Cup	2008	(India) Hyderabad	India, 3–1
Men's Hockey Junior Asia Cup	2012	(Malaysia) Malacca	Draw 2–2
Men's Hockey Junior Asia Cup	2015	(Malaysia) Kuantan	India, 6–2
Men's Hockey Junior Asia Cup	2023	(Oman) Salalah	Draw 1–1
Men's Hockey Junior Asia Cup	2023	(Oman) Salalah	India, 2–1
Men's Hockey Junior Asia Cup	2024	(Oman) Muscat	India, 5–3
Sultan of Johor Cup	2011	(Malaysia) Johor Bahru	India, 5–1
Sultan of Johor Cup	2012	(Malaysia) Johor Bahru	Draw 0–0
Sultan of Johor Cup	2013	(Malaysia) Johor Bahru	India, 4–0
Sultan of Johor Cup	2014	(Malaysia) Johor Bahru	India, 6–0
Sultan of Johor Cup	2015	(Malaysia) Johor Bahru	India, 5–1
Sultan of Johor Cup	2023	(Malaysia) Johor Bahru	Draw 3–3
Sultan of Johor Cup	2023	(Malaysia) Johor Bahru	Draw 3–3, India won (p.s.o) 6–5
Sultan of Johor Cup	2025	(Malaysia) Johor Bahru	Draw 3–3

== See also ==
Indian national hockey teams
Men's					Women's				
Senior	Under-21	Under-18	Senior Hockey5s	Under-18 hockey5s	Senior	Under-21	Under-18	Senior Hockey5s	Under-18 hockey5s

- Field hockey in India
- India national para hockey team
