= 2012 Men's Hockey Junior Asia Cup =

International youth field hockey competition

Tournament details
- Host country: Malaysia
- City: Malacca
- Dates: 3–13 May
- Teams: 8 (from 1 confederation)
- Venue(s): MBM Stadium

Final positions
- Champions: Malaysia (1st title)
- Runner-up: Pakistan
- Third place: India

Tournament statistics
- Matches played: 104
- Goals scored: 20 (0.19 per match)

The 2012 Men's Hockey Junior Asia Cup was the seventh edition of the Men's Hockey Junior Asia Cup, the men's international under-21 field hockey championship of Asia, organized by the Asian Hockey Federation. It was held from 3 to 13 May 2012 at the MBM Stadium in Malacca, Malaysia. The top three teams alongside India qualified for the 2013 Men's Hockey Junior World Cup.

The hosts Malaysia won their first tile by defeating Pakistan 2–1 in the final. Two-time defending champions India won the bronze medal by defeating South Korea 2–1 with a golden goal in extra time after the match finished 1–1 in regular time.

== Qualified teams ==
| Dates | Event | Location | Quotas | Qualifiers |
|---|---|---|---|---|
| 11–18 July 2008 | 2008 Junior Asia Cup | Hyderabad, India | 5 | ~~Bangladesh~~; India; Japan; Malaysia; Pakistan; South Korea |
| 23–31 July 2011 | 2011 Junior AHF Cup | Hong Kong | 3 | China; Iran; ~~Singapore~~; Sri Lanka |
| Total | | | 8 | |

== Preliminary round ==
=== Pool A ===
| Pos | Team | Pld | W | D | L | GF | GA | GD | Pts | Qualification |
|---|---|---|---|---|---|---|---|---|---|---|
| 1 | Malaysia (H) | 3 | 3 | 0 | 0 | 15 | 5 | +10 | 9 | Semi-finals and 2013 Junior World Cup |
| 2 | South Korea | 3 | 2 | 0 | 1 | 12 | 8 | +4 | 6 | Semi-finals and 2013 Junior World Cup |
| 3 | Japan | 3 | 1 | 0 | 2 | 5 | 8 | −3 | 3 | |
| 4 | Iran | 3 | 0 | 0 | 3 | 3 | 14 | −11 | 0 | |

Source: Todor66
Rules for classification: 1) points; 2) matches won; 3) goal difference; 4) goals for; 5) head-to-head result; 6) field goals for.
(H) Hosts

3 May 2012
18:05

| South Korea | 4–1 | Japan |

3 May 2012
20:05

| Malaysia | 6–1 | Iran |

5 May 2012
18:05

| Japan | 3–1 | Iran |

5 May 2012
20:05

| Malaysia | 6–3 | South Korea |

6 May 2012
20:05

| South Korea | 5–1 | Iran |

7 May 2012
20:05

| Malaysia | 3–1 | Japan |

=== Pool B ===
| Pos | Team | Pld | W | D | L | GF | GA | GD | Pts | Qualification |
|---|---|---|---|---|---|---|---|---|---|---|
| 1 | Pakistan | 3 | 2 | 1 | 0 | 17 | 2 | +15 | 7 | Semi-finals and 2013 Junior World Cup |
| 2 | India | 3 | 2 | 1 | 0 | 15 | 3 | +12 | 7 | Semi-finals and 2013 Junior World Cup |
| 3 | China | 3 | 1 | 0 | 2 | 6 | 3 | +3 | 3 | |
| 4 | Sri Lanka | 3 | 0 | 0 | 3 | 0 | 30 | −30 | 0 | |

Source: Todor66
Rules for classification: 1) points; 2) matches won; 3) goal difference; 4) goals for; 5) head-to-head result; 6) field goals for.

4 May 2012
18:05

| Pakistan | 1–0 | China |

4 May 2012
20:05

| India | 11–0 | Sri Lanka |

6 May 2012
16:05

| China | 5–0 | Sri Lanka |

6 May 2012
18:05

| Pakistan | 2–2 | India |

7 May 2012
16:05

| India | 2–1 | China |

7 May 2012
20:05

| Pakistan | 14–0 | Sri Lanka |

== Fifth to eighth place classification ==
=== Bracket ===
Cross-overs
9 May
Japan | 5
Sri Lanka | 1
9 May
China | 2
Iran | 0

Fifth place
12 May
Japan | 3
China | 1
Seventh place
12 May
Sri Lanka | 1
Iran | 2

=== Cross-overs ===
9 May 2012
17:35

| Japan | 5–1 | Iran |

9 May 2012
20:05

| China | 2–0 | Iran |

=== Seventh and eighth place ===
12 May 2012
18:05

| Iran | 2–1 | Sri Lanka |

=== Fifth and sixth place ===
12 May 2012
20:05

| Japan | 3–1 | China |

== First to fourth place classification ==
=== Bracket ===
Semi-finals
10 May
Malaysia | 2
India | 1
10 May
Pakistan | 6
South Korea | 1

Final
13 May
Malaysia | 2
Pakistan | 1
Third place
13 May
India (a.s.d.e.t.) | 2
South Korea | 1

=== Semi-finals ===
10 May 2012
17:35

| Malaysia | 2–1 | India |

10 May 2012
20:05

| Pakistan | 6–1 | South Korea |

=== Third and fourth place ===
13 May 2012
18:05

| India | 2–1 (a.s.d.e.t.) | South Korea |

=== Final ===
13 May 2012
20:05

| Malaysia | 2–1 | Pakistan |

== Final standings ==
| Pos | Team | Qualification |
|---|---|---|
| 1st place, gold medalist(s) | Malaysia (H) | 2013 Junior World Cup |
| 2nd place, silver medalist(s) | Pakistan | 2013 Junior World Cup |
| 3rd place, bronze medalist(s) | India | 2013 Junior World Cup |
| 4 | South Korea | 2013 Junior World Cup |
| 5 | Japan | |
| 6 | China | |
| 7 | Iran | |
| 8 | Sri Lanka | |

Source: Todor66
(H) Host
