= Men's Junior AHF Cup =

International men's under-21 field hockey competition in Asia

- Current season, competition or edition: 2026 Men's Junior AHF Cup
- Sport: Field hockey
- Founded: 2003; 23 years ago
- First season: 2003
- No. of teams: 8
- Confederation: AHF (Asia)
- Most recent champion: South Korea (1st title) (2026)
- Most titles: Bangladesh (3 titles)

The Men's Junior AHF Cup is an international men's under-21 field hockey competition in Asia organized by the Asian Hockey Federation. The tournament was founded in 2003 and serves as the qualification tournament for the next Men's Hockey Junior Asia Cup.

Five different teams have won the tournament and the 2026 edition was held in Taldykorgan, Kazakhstan.

== Results ==
#	Year	Host	Final			Third place match			Teams
#	Year	Host	Winner	Score	Runner-up	Third place	Score	Fourth place	Teams
1	2003; Details	Singapore	Chinese Taipei	3–1	Sri Lanka	Bangladesh	3–1	Singapore	8
2	2008; Details	Muscat, Oman	Oman	3–1	China	Chinese Taipei	3–1	Sri Lanka	6
3	2011; Details	Hong Kong	China	2–2 (a.e.t.) (4–3 p.s.o.)	Singapore	Iran	2–0	Sri Lanka	7
4	2014; Details	Dhaka, Bangladesh	Bangladesh	4–0	Oman	Chinese Taipei	6–2	Sri Lanka	5
5	2019; Details	Muscat, Oman	China	0–0 (4–2 p.s.o.)	Oman	Chinese Taipei	5–3	Uzbekistan	9
6	2023; Details	Muscat, Oman	Bangladesh	1–1 (7–6 p.s.o.)	Oman	Thailand	2–2 (2–1 p.s.o.)	Uzbekistan	8
7	2024; Details	Singapore	Bangladesh	4–2	China	Thailand	2–2 (3–2 s.o.)	Chinese Taipei	11
8	2026; Details	Taldykorgan, Kazakhstan	South Korea	5–3	Uzbekistan	Kazakhstan	3–0	Thailand	8

== Summary ==
Team	Winners	Runners-up	Third place	Fourth place
Bangladesh	3 (2014*, 2023, 2024)		1 (2003)	
China	2 (2011, 2019)	2 (2008, 2024)		
Oman	1 (2008*)	3 (2014, 2019*, 2023*)		
Chinese Taipei	1 (2003)		3 (2008, 2014, 2019)	1 (2024)
South Korea	1 (2026)			
Sri Lanka		1 (2003)		3 (2008, 2011, 2014)
Uzbekistan		1 (2026)		2 (2019, 2023)
Singapore		1 (2011)		1 (2003*)
Thailand			2 (2023, 2024)	1 (2026)
Iran			1 (2011)	
Kazakhstan			1 (2026*)	

* = hosts

== Team appearances ==
Team	(Singapore) 2003	(Oman) 2008	(Hong Kong) 2011	(Bangladesh) 2014	(Oman) 2019	(Oman) 2023	(Singapore) 2024	(Kazakhstan) 2026	Total
Bangladesh	3rd	–	–	1st	–	1st	1st	–	4
China	–	2nd	1st	–	1st	–	2nd	–	4
Chinese Taipei	1st	3rd	5th	3rd	3rd	5th	4th	–	7
Hong Kong	7th	–	7th	–	9th	8th	10th	–	5
Indonesia	–	–	–	–	–	7th	6th	5th	3
Iran	8th	–	3rd	–	7th	–	7th	7th	5
Kazakhstan	–	–	–	–	–	–	9th	3rd	2
Macau	6th	–	–	–	–	–	–	–	1
Oman	5th	1st	6th	2nd	2nd	2nd	5th	–	7
Singapore	4th	5th	2nd	–	5th	–	8th	–	5
South Korea	–	–	–	–	–	–	–	1st	1
Sri Lanka	2nd	4th	4th	4th	8th	6th	11th	6th	8
Tajikistan	–	–	–	–	–	–	–	8th	1
Thailand	–	6th	–	5th	6th	3rd	3rd	4th	6
Uzbekistan	–	–	–	–	4th	4th	–	2nd	3
Total (15)	8	6	7	5	9	8	11	8	

== See also ==
- Men's AHF Cup
- Men's Hockey Junior Asia Cup
- Men's Hockey U18 Asia Cup
- Women's Junior AHF Cup
