= 2008 Men's Hockey Junior Asia Cup =

International youth field hockey competition

Tournament details
- Host country: India
- City: Hyderabad
- Dates: 11–18 July
- Teams: 8 (from 1 confederation)
- Venue: Gachibowli Hockey Stadium

Final positions
- Champions: India (2nd title)
- Runner-up: South Korea
- Third place: Pakistan

Tournament statistics
- Matches played: 20
- Goals scored: 120 (6 per match)

The 2008 Men's Hockey Junior Asia Cup was the sixth edition of the Men's Hockey Junior Asia Cup, the men's international under-21 field hockey championship of Asia, organized by the Asian Hockey Federation. It was held at the Gachibowli Hockey Stadium in Hyderabad, India from 11 to 18 July 2008.

The hosts India defended their title from the previous edition to win their second title by defeating South Korea 3–2 with a golden goal in extra time after the match finished 2–2 in regular time.

== Qualified teams ==
Dates	Event	Location	Quotas	Qualifiers
20–29 April 2004	2004 Junior Asia Cup	Karachi, Pakistan	6	Bangladesh; India; Japan; Malaysia; Pakistan; South Korea
14–22 January 2008	2008 Junior AHF Cup	Muscat, Oman	2	Oman; Singapore
Total			8	

== Preliminary round ==
=== Pool A ===
Pos	Team	Pld	W	D	L	GF	GA	GD	Pts	Qualification
1	India (H)	3	3	0	0	11	1	+10	9	Semi-finals and 2009 Junior World Cup
2	Japan	3	2	0	1	12	4	+8	6	Semi-finals and 2009 Junior World Cup
3	Malaysia	3	0	1	2	4	8	−4	1	
4	Singapore	3	0	1	2	3	17	−14	1	

Source: Todor66
Rules for classification: 1) points; 2) matches won; 3) goal difference; 4) goals for; 5) head-to-head result; 6) field goals for.
(H) Hosts

11 July 2008

Malaysia	2–2	Singapore

11 July 2008

India	2–0	Japan

13 July 2008

Japan	9–1	Singapore

13 July 2008

India	3–1	Malaysia

14 July 2008

Japan	3–1	Malaysia

14 July 2008

India	6–0	Singapore

=== Pool B ===
Pos	Team	Pld	W	D	L	GF	GA	GD	Pts	Qualification
1	South Korea	3	2	1	0	22	3	+19	7	Semi-finals and 2009 Junior World Cup
2	Pakistan	3	2	1	0	16	6	+10	7	Semi-finals and 2009 Junior World Cup
3	Bangladesh	3	1	0	2	9	17	−8	3	
4	Oman	3	0	0	3	2	23	−21	0	

Source: Todor66
Rules for classification: 1) points; 2) matches won; 3) goal difference; 4) goals for; 5) head-to-head result; 6) field goals for.

11 July 2008

Pakistan	5–1	Oman

11 July 2008

South Korea	8–0	Bangladesh

12 July 2008

Bangladesh	7–1	Oman

12 July 2008

South Korea	3–3	Pakistan

14 July 2008

South Korea	11–0	Oman

14 July 2008

Pakistan	8–2	Bangladesh

== Fifth to eighth place classification ==
=== Bracket ===
Cross-overs
16 July
Malaysia	5
Oman	1
16 July
Bangladesh	3
Singapore	1

Fifth place
17 July
Malaysia	1
Bangladesh	0
Seventh place
17 July
Oman	5
Singapore	1

=== Cross-overs ===
16 July 2008

Malaysia	5–1	Oman

16 July 2008

Bangladesh	3–1	Singapore

=== Seventh and eighth place ===
17 July 2008

Oman	5–1	Singapore

=== Fifth and sixth place ===
17 July 2008

Malaysia	1–0	Bangladesh

== First to fourth place classification ==
=== Bracket ===
Semi-finals
16 July
India	3
Pakistan	1
16 July
South Korea	4
Japan	2

Final
18 July
India (a.s.d.e.t.)	3
South Korea	2
Third place
18 July
Pakistan	7
Japan	2

=== Semi-finals ===
16 July 2008

India	3–1	Pakistan

16 July 2008

South Korea	4–1	Japan

=== Third and fourth place ===
18 July 2008

Pakistan	7–2	Japan

=== Final ===
18 July 2008

India	3–2 (a.s.d.e.t.)	South Korea

== Final standings ==
Pos	Team	Qualification
1st place, gold medalist(s)	India (H)	2009 Junior World Cup
2nd place, silver medalist(s)	South Korea	2009 Junior World Cup
3rd place, bronze medalist(s)	Pakistan	2009 Junior World Cup
4	Japan	2009 Junior World Cup
5	Malaysia	
6	Bangladesh	
7	Oman	
8	Singapore	

Source: Todor66
(H) Host
