= 2019 Men's Junior AHF Cup =

Tournament details
- Host country: Oman
- City: Muscat
- Dates: 5–14 December
- Teams: 9 (from 1 confederation)
- Venue(s): Sultan Qaboos Sports Complex

Final positions
- Champions: China (2nd title)
- Runner-up: Oman
- Third place: Chinese Taipei

Tournament statistics
- Matches played: 23
- Goals scored: 103 (4.48 per match)
- Top scorer(s): (Oman) Rashad Al-Fazari (8 goals)
- Best player: (Uzbekistan) Gaybullo Khaytboev

The 2019 Men's Junior AHF Cup was the fifth edition of the Men's Junior AHF Cup, the qualification tournament for the Men's Hockey Junior Asia Cup organized by the Asian Hockey Federation.

It was held at the Sultan Qaboos Sports Complex in Muscat, Oman from 5 to 14 December 2019. The top four teams qualified for the 2021 Junior Asia Cup.

China won the tournament for the second time by defeating the hosts Oman 4–2 in a shoot-out after the match ended 0–0. Chinese Taipei won the bronze medal by defeating Uzbekistan 5–3.

== Teams ==
The participating teams were announced on 15 November 2019. Afghanistan withdrew before the tournament.

- ~~Afghanistan~~
- China
- Chinese Taipei
- Hong Kong
- Iran
- Oman
- Singapore
- Sri Lanka
- Thailand
- Uzbekistan

== Results ==
All times are local, GST (UTC+4).

=== Preliminary round ===
==== Pool A ====
Pos	Team	Pld	W	D	L	GF	GA	GD	Pts	Qualification
1	China	4	4	0	0	17	2	+15	12	Semi-finals and 2021 Junior Asia Cup
2	Uzbekistan	4	2	1	1	7	9	−2	7	Semi-finals and 2021 Junior Asia Cup
3	Thailand	4	1	1	2	6	9	−3	4	Fifth place game
4	Iran	4	1	1	2	5	8	−3	4	Seventh place game
5	Sri Lanka	4	0	1	3	7	14	−7	1	Cross-over

Source: FIH
Rules for classification: 1) points; 2) matches won; 3) goal difference; 4) goals for; 5) head-to-head result; 6) field goals scored.

5 December 2019
16:00

Thailand	1–1	Iran
Suriya 16'	Report	Keramati 55'

Umpires:
Salim Lucky (BAN)
Rakesh Kumar (SGP)

5 December 2019
18:00

Sri Lanka	2–2	Uzbekistan
Bodhika 47', 60'	Report	Aslanov 8'; Khaytboev 30'

Umpires:
Kamran Hussain (PAK)
Ravdeep Sethi (HKG)

6 December 2019
20:00

China	3–1	Iran
Wen Ke 33'; Chen Chongcong 53'; Fu Rifa 57'	Report	Shahrokhi 36'

Umpires:
Khamis Al-Balushi (OMA)
Kuo Chun-Kai (TPE)

7 December 2019
16:00

Thailand	1–3	Uzbekistan
Theerachai 40'	Report	Egamberdiev 24'; O. Madaminov 37'; Aslanov 39'

Umpires:
Ahmad Berhaumidin (MAS)
Salim Lucky (BAN)

7 December 2019
18:00

Sri Lanka	1–5	China
Vipul 32'	Report	He Yonghua 3'; Ding Yongle 21'; Xu Yaozhen 30+'; Huang Ziyang 44'; Fu Rifa 59'

Umpires:
Mazin Al-Shukaili (OMA)
Shigeki Kodama (JPN)

8 December 2019
18:00

Uzbekistan	2–0	Iran
D. Solijonov 4'; Aslanov 60'	Report

Umpires:
Kamran Hussain (PAK)
Ravdeep Sethi (HKG)

10 December 2019
16:00

Thailand	0–3	China
	Report	Fu Rifa 19'; Ding Yongle 45'; Xu Yaozhen 53'

Umpires:
Mazin Al-Shukaili (OMA)
Kuo Chun-Kai (TPE)

10 December 2019
18:00

Iran	3–2	Sri Lanka
Shahrokhi 27', 58'; Abbaszad 33'	Report	Thiran 6'; Vipul 11'

Umpires:
Rakesh Kumar (SGP)
Khamis Al-Balushi (OMA)

11 December 2019
16:00

China	6–0	Uzbekistan
Xu Yaozhen 5', 51'; Wen Ke 7'; He Yonghua 37', 50'; Huang Ziyang 43'	Report

Umpires:
Kamran Hussain (PAK)
Khamis Al-Balushi (OMA)

11 December 2019
18:00

Sri Lanka	2–4	Thailand
Vipul 35'; Thiran 39'	Report	Theerachai 6'; Kritsada 29'; Chanachol 44', 45'

Umpires:
Ravdeep Sethi (HKG)
Ahmad Berhaumidin (MAS)

==== Pool B ====
Pos	Team	Pld	W	D	L	GF	GA	GD	Pts	Qualification
1	Oman (H)	3	3	0	0	15	2	+13	9	Semi-finals and 2021 Junior Asia Cup
2	Chinese Taipei	3	2	0	1	7	5	+2	6	Semi-finals and 2021 Junior Asia Cup
3	Singapore	3	1	0	2	8	6	+2	3	Fifth place game
4	Hong Kong	3	0	0	3	0	17	−17	0	Cross-over

Source: FIH
Rules for classification: 1) points; 2) matches won; 3) goal difference; 4) goals for; 5) head-to-head result; 6) field goals scored.
(H) Hosts

5 December 2019
20:00

Oman	7–0	Hong Kong
A. Al-Noufali 2'; Al-Fazari 5', 36'; Al-Lawati 17', 33', 47'; Al-Owaisi 58'	Report

Umpires:
Shigeki Kodama (JPN)
Duminda Perera (SRI)

6 December 2019
18:00

Singapore	1–2	Chinese Taipei
Alton 19'	Report	Hsieh Tsung-yu 30'; Wu Chi-chieh 38'

Umpires:
Ahmad Berhaumidin (MAS)
Li Zecheng (CHN)

7 December 2019
20:00

Hong Kong	0–4	Chinese Taipei
	Report	Li Kuan-yi 21'; Hsieh Tsung-yu 30'; Ma Tzu-Yu 36'; Wu Chi-wei 60'

Umpires:
Phiraphat Niensupornphand (THA)
Rahmatollah Mohammadi (IRI)

8 December 2019
20:00

Singapore	1–4	Oman
Alton 56'	Report	S. A. Bait 10', 28'; A. Al-Noufali 43'; Al-Fazari 45'

Umpires:
Li Zecheng (CHN)
Duminda Perera (SRI)

10 December 2019
20:00

Oman	4–1	Chinese Taipei
Al-Fazari 2', 34'; S. A. Bait 3'; A. Al-Noufali 49'	Report	Hsieh Tsung-yu 22'

Umpires:
Shigeki Kodama (JPN)
Salim Lucky (BAN)

11 December 2019
20:00

Hong Kong	0–6	Singapore
	Report	Alton 2'; Ramanan 3', 54'; Muhammad 9'; Ethan 14'; Akash 35'

Umpires:
Salim Lucky (BAN)
Rahmatollah Mohammadi (IRI)

=== Fifth to ninth place classification ===
Cross-over
13 December
Sri Lanka	4
Hong Kong	2

Seventh place
14 December
Iran (s.o.)	1 (3)
Sri Lanka	1 (1)

==== Cross-over ====
13 December 2019
16:00

Sri Lanka	4–2	Hong Kong
Dilshan 2'; Thiran 30'; Bodhika 38'; Vipul 53'	Report	McNeil 28', 57'

Umpires:
Phiraphat Niensupornphand (THA)
Rakesh Kumar (SGP)

==== Seventh place game ====
14 December 2019
13:45

Iran	1–1	Sri Lanka
Ezzati 38'	Report	Bodhika 38'
Penalties
Hamedi (penalty shoot-out missed); Abbaszad (penalty shoot-out scored); Salehipour (penalty shoot-out missed); Mirzakhani (penalty shoot-out scored); Shahrokhi (penalty shoot-out scored)	3–1	(penalty shoot-out missed) Shashinta; (penalty shoot-out scored) Bathiya; (penalty shoot-out missed) Amjad; (penalty shoot-out missed) Thiran

Umpires:
Khamis Al-Balushi (OMA)
Li Zecheng (CHN)

==== Fifth place game ====
14 December 2019
16:00

Thailand	0–1	Singapore
	Report	Jerome 6'

Umpires:
Duminda Perera (SRI)
Kuo Chun-kai (TPE)

=== First to fourth place classification ===
Semi-finals
13 December
China	4
Chinese Taipei	2
13 December
Oman	7
Uzbekistan	1

Final
14 December
China (s.o.)	0 (4)
Oman	0 (2)
Third place
14 December
Chinese Taipei	5
Uzbekistan	3

==== Semi-finals ====
13 December 2019
18:15

China	4–2	Chinese Taipei
Wen Ke 9'; He Yonghua 14'; Huang Ziyang 37', 38'	Report	Hsieh Tsung-yu 15', 37'

Umpires:
Mazin Al-Shukaili (OMA)
Shigeki Kodama (JPN)

13 December 2019
20:30

Oman	7–1	Uzbekistan
Al-Fazari 6', 28', 28'; Al-Lawati 22'; Al-Shibli 40'; Al-Wahaibi 48'; Al-Amri 56'	Report	Yuldashev 24'

Umpires:
Ahmad Berhaumidin (MAS)
Kamran Hussain (PAK)

==== Third place game ====
14 December 2019
18:15

Chinese Taipei	5–3	Uzbekistan
Hsieh Tsung-yu 6', 60'; Tung Wei-chan 11'; Li Kuan-yi 20'; Yu Tien-yi 47'	Report	Khaytboev 19', 53'; Mamajonov 24'

Umpires:
Ravdeep Sethi (HKG)
Mazin Al-Shukaili (OMA)

==== Final ====
14 December 2019
20:30

China	0–0	Oman
	Report
Penalties
He Yonghua (penalty shoot-out missed); Fu Rifa (penalty shoot-out scored); Li Rongliang (penalty shoot-out scored); Ding Yongle (penalty shoot-out scored); Xu Yaozhen (penalty shoot-out scored)	4–2	(penalty shoot-out missed) S. A. Bait; (penalty shoot-out scored) Al-Amri; (penalty shoot-out scored) Al-Fazari; (penalty shoot-out missed) Al-Mashari

Umpires:
Shigeki Kodama (JON)
Salim Lucky (BAN)

== Statistics ==
=== Final standings ===
Pos	Team	Qualification
1	China	2021 Junior Asia Cup
2	Oman (H)	2021 Junior Asia Cup
3	Chinese Taipei	2021 Junior Asia Cup
4	Uzbekistan	2021 Junior Asia Cup
5	Singapore	
6	Thailand	
7	Iran	
8	Sri Lanka	
9	Hong Kong	

Source: FIH
(H) Host

=== Awards ===
The following awards were given at the conclusion of the tournament.

Player of the tournament	Top goalscorer	Best Goalkeeper
(Uzbekistan) Gaybullo Khaytboev	(Oman) Rashad Al-Fazari	(China) Hu Junyuan

=== Goalscorers ===
There were 103 goals scored in 23 matches, for an average of 4.48 goals per match.

8 goals

- (Oman) Rashad Al-Fazari

7 goals

- (Chinese Taipei) Hsieh Tsung-yu

4 goals

- (China) He Yonghua
- (China) Huang Ziyang
- (China) Xu Yaozhen
- (Oman) Fahad Al-Lawati
- (Sri Lanka) Bodhika Dias
- (Sri Lanka) Vipul Warnakula

3 goals

- (China) Fu Rifa
- (China) Wen Ke
- (Iran) Mahdi Shahrokhi
- (Oman) Aliyas Al-Noufali
- (Oman) Shamaiaa Akram Bait
- (Singapore) Alton Chua
- (Sri Lanka) Thiran Uluvitike
- (Uzbekistan) Mukhammadkarim Aslanov
- (Uzbekistan) Gaybullo Khaytboev

2 goals

- (China) Ding Yongle
- (Chinese Taipei) Li Kuan-yi
- (Hong Kong) Cameron McNeil
- (Singapore) Ramanan Thulasiram
- (Thailand) Chanachol Rungniyom
- (Thailand) Theerachai Sansamran

1 goal

- (China) Chen Chongcong
- (Chinese Taipei) Ma Tzu-yu
- (Chinese Taipei) Tung Wei-chan
- (Chinese Taipei) Wu Chi-chieh
- (Chinese Taipei) Wu Chi-wei
- (Chinese Taipei) Yu Tien-yi
- (Iran) Farhad Abbaszad
- (Iran) Ramin Ezzati
- (Iran) Miad Keramati
- (Oman) Ahmed Al-Amri
- (Oman) Ali Al-Owaisi
- (Oman) Saleh Al-Wahaibi
- (Oman) Asama Al-Shibli
- (Singapore) Jerome Chew
- (Singapore) Akash Prebhash
- (Singapore) Muhammad Rosli
- (Singapore) Ethan Tan
- (Sri Lanka) Dilshan Mohammad
- (Thailand) Kritsada Chueamkaew
- (Thailand) Suriya Kasonbua
- (Uzbekistan) Furkatbek Egamberdiev
- (Uzbekistan) Otabek Madaminov
- (Uzbekistan) Islombek Mamajonov
- (Uzbekistan) Dilshodbek Solijonov
- (Uzbekistan) Daniel Yuldashev

Source: FIH

== See also ==
- 2019 Women's Junior AHF Cup
