= South Korea men's national under-21 field hockey team =

South Korea U21
- Association: Korea Hockey Association
- Confederation: AHF (Asia)

FIH ranking
- Current: 14

Junior World Cup
- Appearances: 10 (first in 1989)
- Best result: 4th (1989)

Junior Asia Cup
- Appearances: 11 (first in 2000)
- Best result: (gold) 1st (2000)
Medal record
Junior Asia Cup
Gold medal – first place	2000 Kuala Lumpur
Silver medal – second place	1988 Karachi
Silver medal – second place	2008 Hyderabad
Silver medal – second place	2026 Moqi
Bronze medal – third place	1992 Kuala Lumpur
Bronze medal – third place	2004 Karachi
Bronze medal – third place	2015 Kuantan
Bronze medal – third place	2023 Salalah

The South Korea men's national under-21 field hockey team represents the Republic of Korea (South Korea) in the international men's junior field hockey competitions. They won the Junior Asia Cup title once, in 2000 and are the reigning Junior Asia Cup silver medallists.

South Korea reached the semi-finals of the Junior World Cup only once, in 1989. They won bronze at the inaugural 2011 Sultan of Johor Cup by defeating India.

South Korea qualified to the final of the 2026 Junior Asia Cup, after 18 years since 2008, by defeating Japan in the group stage and Pakistan in the semi-final, but lost to India in the final.

== Tournament record ==
=== Junior World Cup ===
- 1989 – 4th
- 1993 – 9th
- 2001 – 7th
- 2005 – 8th
- 2009 – 7th
- 2013 – 8th
- 2016 – 14th
- 2021 – 10th
- 2023 – 13th
- 2025 – 19th
- 2027 – Qualified

=== Junior Asia Cup ===
- 1988 – (silver)
- 1992 – (bronze)
- 1996 – 4th
- 2000 – (gold)
- 2004 – (bronze)
- 2008 – (silver)
- 2012 – 4th
- 2015 – (bronze)
- 2023 – (bronze)
- 2024 – 8th
- 2026 – (silver)

=== Junior AHF Cup ===
- 2026 – (gold)

=== Sultan of Johor Cup ===
- 2011 – (bronze)
- 2013 – 5th

== Current squad ==
The following team was announced for the 2026 Junior Asia Cup.

Head Coach: (South Korea) Lim Jung-bin

1. Kim Jin-soo (GK)
2. Son Changhwi
3. Kwon Jung-wan
4. Kim Chan-soo
5. Park Jae-won
6. Yoo Hyo-guk
7. Moon Ui-joon
8. Lee Min-hyeok (C)
9. Kang Tae-wook
10. Yu Seung-chul
11. Kwon Ye-chan
12. Pyo Jun-huk
13. Kim Min-jae
14. Sung Dany
15. Ham Yeong-ung
16. Choi Do-hyeon
17. Kyung Min-jun
18. Park Seo-won
19. Song Da-bin
20. Lee Ji-hoon (GK)

Source: FIH

== See also ==
- South Korea men's national field hockey team
