= Amirul Islam (field hockey) =

Bangladeshi field hockey player

Personal information
- Full name: Amirul Islam
- Born: 10 November 2005 (age 20) Faridpur, Bangladesh
- Height: 1.81 m (5 ft 11 in)
- Weight: 74 kg (163 lb)

Sport
- Sport: Field hockey
- Position: Defender
National team
Years	Team	Caps	Goals
2023–	Bangladesh U21	24	(36)
2023–	Bangladesh U22	5	(9)
2023–	Bangladesh	23	(6)

Amirul Islam (Bengali: আমিরুল ইসলাম; born 10 November 2005) is a Bangladeshi professional field hockey player who plays as a defender. He is a prominent emerging talent in Bangladeshi hockey, known for his powerful and precise penalty corner conversions and is widely regarded as the primary drag-flick specialist for the Bangladesh & Bangladesh junior national team.

== Early life ==
He started playing hockey at the age of 10. He was introduced to the drag-flick skill much later, during the 2019 Independence Cup, while playing for BKSP.

== International career ==
=== Youth level ===
Amirul gained international recognition during Bangladesh's debut appearance at the U21 Hockey World Cup held in Chennai, India. His performance in the opening matches earned him a spot among the tournament's leading goal scorers.

He achieved the rare feat of scoring back-to-back hat-tricks in the group stage, scoring three penalty corner goals in the team's opening match, a 3–5 loss against Australia and three more penalty corner goals, spearheading a historic 3–3 comeback draw against South Korea after Bangladesh trailed 0–3.
