= Sarower Hossain =

Bangladeshi field hockey player

Personal information
- Full name: Sarower Hossain
- National team: Bangladesh Hockey
- Born: Bangladesh

Sarower Hossain (Bengali: সারোয়ার হোসেন) is a Bangladeshi field hockey player and is an international player in Bangladesh. He is a player of Bangladesh national field hockey team.
