= Japan men's national under-21 field hockey team =

Japan
- Association: Japan Hockey Association
- Confederation: AHF (Asia)
- Head Coach: Yoshihiro Anai
- Assistant coach(es): Manabu Yamashita
- Manager: Takayasu Mizawa
- Captain: Yamato Kawahara

Junior World Cup
- Appearances: 4 (first in 1997)
- Best result: 11th (1997)

Junior Asia Cup
- Appearances: 11 (first in 1988)
- Best result: (bronze) 3rd (1996, 2024)
Medal record
Junior Asia Cup
Bronze medal – third place	1996 Singapore
Bronze medal – third place	2024 Muscat

The Japan men's national under-21 field hockey team represents Japan in international under-21 field hockey competitions and is controlled by the Japan Hockey Association, the governing body for field hockey in Japan.

Japan has participated in every edition of the Men's Hockey Junior Asia Cup, where their best finish was third place in 1996 and 2024. They have qualified four times for the Men's FIH Hockey Junior World Cup, where their best finish is 11th place in 1997.

== Tournament record ==
=== FIH Hockey Junior World Cup ===
Junior World Cup record
Year	Host	Position	Pld	W	D	L	GF	GA	Squad
1979 to 1993		did not qualify							
1997	Milton Keynes, England	11th	7	2	0	5	17	22	—N/a
2001 to 2005		did not qualify							
2009	Johor Bahru, Malaysia; Singapore	13th	8	3	1	4	14	26	—N/a
2013	New Delhi, India	did not qualify							
2016	Lucknow, India	13th	5	2	0	3	5	12	Squad
2021 to 2023		did not qualify							
2025	Tamil Nadu, India	14th	6	2	1	3	10	12	Squad
2027	TBD	Qualified							
Total		11th place	26	9	2	15	46	72	

=== Junior Asia Cup ===
Junior Asia Cup record
Year	Host	Position
1988	Karachi, Pakistan	6th
1992	Kuala Lumpur, Malaysia	7th
1996	Singapore	3rd
2000	Kuala Lumpur, Malaysia	4th
2004	Karachi, Pakistan	5th
2008	Hyderabad, India	4th
2012	Malacca, Malaysia	5th
2015	Kuantan, Malaysia	4th
2021	Dhaka, Bangladesh	cancelled
2023	Salalah, Oman	5th
2024	Muscat, Oman	3rd
2026	Moqi, China	5th
Best result		3rd

=== Sultan Of Johor Cup ===
- 2016 – (bronze)
- 2017 – 5th place
- 2018 – 4th place
- 2019 – 4th place
- 2022 – 4th place
- 2024 – 5th place
- 2026 – (bronze)

== Current squad ==
On 30 October 2024, the following 18 players were called up for the 2024 Junior Asia Cup in Muscat, Oman from 26 November to 4 December 2024.

Caps updated as of 26 November 2024, after the match against Chinese Taipei.

No.	Pos.	Player	Date of birth (age)	Caps	Club
17	GK	Kisho Kuroda	20 November 2003 (age 22)	17	(Japan) Tenri University
18	GK	Koki Origasa	17 March 2005 (age 21)	7	(Japan) Yamanashi Gakuin University
3	DF	Hyota Yamada	30 January 2003 (age 23)	13	(Japan) Asahi University
4	DF	Yamato Kawahara (Captain)	21 January 2004 (age 22)	19	(Japan) Ritsumeikan University
5	DF	Koyo Nishida	31 August 2003 (age 23)	7	(Japan) Ritsumeikan University
6	DF	Jun Watanabe	17 May 2003 (age 23)	19	(Japan) Tenri University
7	DF	Neo Sato	6 December 2004 (age 21)	7	(Japan) Yamanashi Gakuin University
21	DF	Ryuji Tanaka	26 December 2006 (age 19)	7	(Japan) Tottori Prefectural Yazu High School
8	MF	Rakusei Yamanaka	6 July 2004 (age 22)	7	(Japan) Ritsumeikan University
10	MF	Jota Nakajima	7 September 2003 (age 23)	19	(Japan) Tenri University
11	MF	Yuito Matsuzaki	20 April 2003 (age 23)	19	(Japan) Tenri University
12	MF	Atsuki Yamanaka	14 March 2005 (age 21)	7	(Japan) Fukui University of Technology
13	MF	Shogo Sasaki	20 July 2005 (age 21)	7	(Japan) Ritsumeikan University
1	FW	Yuma Fujiwara	3 March 2008 (age 18)	7	(Japan) Iwate Prefectural Numamiya High School
9	FW	Tsubasa Tanaka	10 October 2003 (age 23)	19	(Japan) Tenri University
15	FW	Yuto Higuchu	30 September 2005 (age 21)	13	(Japan) Ritsumeikan University
16	FW	Naru Kimura	27 December 2005 (age 20)	7	(Japan) Ritsumeikan University
23	FW	Ryosuke Shinohara	18 October 2005 (age 21)	1	(Japan) Yamanashi Gakuin University

== See also ==
- Japan men's national field hockey team
- Japan women's national under-21 field hockey team
