= Men's Hockey Junior Asia Cup =

International U21 field hockey tournament

- Most recent season or competition: 2026 Men's Hockey Junior Asia Cup
- Sport: Field hockey
- Founded: 1988; 38 years ago
- First season: 1988
- No. of teams: 10
- Confederation: Asian Hockey Federation
- Most recent champion: India (6th title) (2026)
- Most titles: India (6 titles)
- Qualification: Junior AHF Cup

The Men's Hockey Junior Asia Cup is a men's international under-21 field hockey tournament organized by the Asian Hockey Federation. The tournament has been held since 1988 and serves as a qualification tournament for the Men's FIH Hockey Junior World Cup. Competitors must be under the age of 21 as of December 31 in the year before the tournament is held. The most recent edition was held in China and was won by India.

The tournament has been won by four different teams: India has the most titles with six and Pakistan follows with three. Malaysia and South Korea have both won the tournament once. The 2021 edition, to be held in Dhaka, Bangladesh, was canceled due to the COVID-19 pandemic.

== Results ==
#	Year	Host	Final			Third place match			Teams
#	Year	Host	Winner	Score	Runner-up	Third place	Score	Fourth place	Teams
1	1988; Details	Karachi, Pakistan	Pakistan	Round-robin	South Korea	India	Round-robin	Malaysia	7
2	1992; Details	Kuala Lumpur, Malaysia	Pakistan	3–0	Malaysia	South Korea	2–2 (a.e.t.) (4–1 (p.s.)	India	10
3	1996; Details	Singapore	Pakistan	2–2 (a.e.t.) (5–4 p.s.)	India	Japan	1–1 (a.e.t.) (5–4 p.s.)	South Korea	10
4	2000; Details	Kuala Lumpur, Malaysia	South Korea	3–2	India	Malaysia	2–1	Japan	11
5	2004; Details	Karachi, Pakistan	India	5–2	Pakistan	South Korea	2–1	Malaysia	10
6	2008; Details	Hyderabad, India	India	3–2	South Korea	Pakistan	7–2	Japan	8
7	2012; Details	Malacca, Malaysia	Malaysia	2–1	Pakistan	India	2–1 (a.s.d.e.t.)	South Korea	8
8	2015; Details	Kuantan, Malaysia	India	6–2	Pakistan	South Korea	2–1	Japan	8
-	2021; Details	Dhaka, Bangladesh	Cancelled due to the COVID-19 pandemic.			Cancelled			10
9	2023; Details	Salalah, Oman	India	2–1	Pakistan	South Korea	2–1	Malaysia	10
10	2024; Details	Muscat, Oman	India	5–3	Pakistan	Japan	2–1	Malaysia	10
11	2026; Details	Moqi, China	India	4–1	South Korea	Pakistan	4–2	Malaysia	10

== Performance by nations ==
Team	Winners	Runners-up	Third place	Fourth place
India	6 (2004, 2008*, 2015, 2023, 2024, 2026)	2 (1996, 2000)	2 (1987, 2012)	1 (1992)
Pakistan	3 (1987*, 1992, 1996)	5 (2004*, 2012, 2015, 2023, 2024)	2 (2008, 2026)	
South Korea	1 (2000)	3 (1987, 2008, 2026)	4 (1992, 2004, 2015, 2023)	2 (1996, 2012)
Malaysia	1 (2012*)	1 (1992*)	1 (2000*)	5 (1987, 2004, 2023, 2024, 2026)
Japan			2 (1996, 2024)	3 (2000, 2008, 2015)

* = host nation

== Team appearances ==
Team	(Pakistan) 1988	(Malaysia) 1992	(Singapore) 1996	(Malaysia) 2000	(Pakistan) 2004	(India) 2008	(Malaysia) 2012	(Malaysia) 2015	(Oman) 2023	(Oman) 2024	(China) 2026	Total
Bangladesh	–	5th	6th	7th	6th	6th	W	6th	6th	5th	7th	9
China	5th	6th	7th	6th	7th	–	6th	7th	–	6th	6th	9
Chinese Taipei	–	–	–	8th	9th	–	–	–	10th	10th	8th	5
India	3rd	4th	2nd	2nd	1st	1st	3rd	1st	1st	1st	1st	11
Indonesia	–	–	–	–	–	–	–	–	–	–	9th	1
Iran	—	–	–	11th	–	–	7th	–	–	–	–	2
Japan	6th	7th	3rd	4th	5th	4th	5th	4th	5th	3rd	5th	11
Kazakhstan	–	–	–	–	–	–	–	–	–	–	10th	1
Macau	7th	–	–	–	–	–	–	–	-	–	–	1
Malaysia	4th	2nd	5th	3rd	4th	5th	1st	5th	4th	4th	4th	11
Oman	–	8th	–	–	–	7th	–	8th	7th	9th	–	5
Pakistan	1st	1st	1st	5th	2nd	3rd	2nd	2nd	2nd	2nd	3rd	11
Singapore	–	10th	9th	10th	8th	8th	–	–	–	–	–	5
South Korea	2nd	3rd	4th	1st	3rd	2nd	4th	3rd	3rd	8th	2nd	11
Sri Lanka	–	9th	8th	–	10th	–	8th	–	–	–	–	4
Thailand	–	–	10th	–	–	–	–	–	8th	7th	–	3
Uzbekistan	–	–	–	9th	–	–	–	–	9th	–	–	2
Total (17)	7	10	10	11	10	8	8	8	10	10	10	

== See also ==
- Men's Hockey Asia Cup
- Men's Junior AHF Cup
- Men's Hockey U18 Asia Cup
- Women's Hockey Junior Asia Cup
