= 2026 Sultan of Johor Cup =

Men's U21 field hockey tournament in Malaysia

Tournament details
- Host country: Malaysia
- City: Johor Bahru
- Dates: 17 October – 24 October
- Teams: 5 (from 2 confederations)
- Venue: Taman Daya Hockey Stadium

Final positions
- Champions: Malaysia (2nd title)
- Runner-up: Pakistan
- Third place: Japan

Tournament statistics
- Matches played: 12
- Goals scored: 72 (6 per match)
- Top scorer: (Japan) Ryosuke Shinohara (5 goals)
- Best player: (Pakistan) Muhammad Ammad
- Best goalkeeper: (Malaysia) Muhammad Adib

The 2026 Sultan of Johor Cup was the fourteenth edition of the Sultan of Johor Cup, an international men's under–21 field hockey tournament in Malaysia. Taman Daya Hockey Stadium in Johor Bahru hosted the tournament, contested by five teams, from 17 October to 24 October 2026. Malaysia won their second title since 2011 with a shootout victory over Pakistan in the final.

Australia, the defending champions, did not compete in this edition.

Sukan RTM served as the official broadcaster.

== Venue ==
(Malaysia) Tebrau
Taman Daya Hockey Stadium
Capacity: 5,000
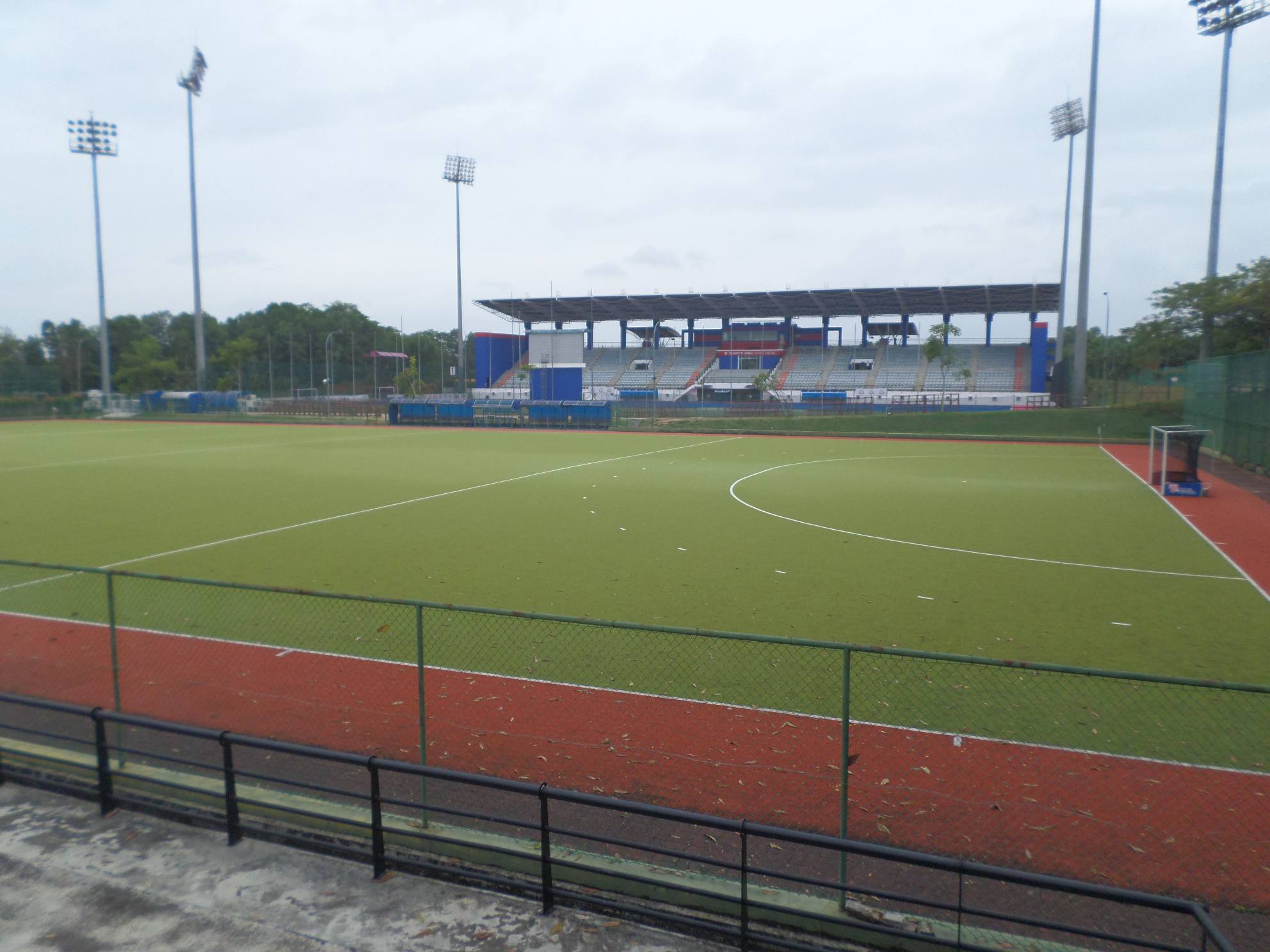

== Teams ==
The 2026 edition had the lowest participation in the tournament's history, with only five nations competed, including hosts Malaysia.

Country	FIH Junior Ranking	Previous Best Appearance	Best FIH Junior World Cup Finish
Canada	16	Debut	8th (1982)
China	20	Debut	20th (2025)
Japan	17	Third Place (2016)	11th (1997)
Malaysia	11	Champions (2011)	Fourth Place (1979, 1982, 2013)
Pakistan	12	Runners-up (2016)	Champions (1979)

== Squads ==
Canada

Head Coach: (Netherlands) Koen Bakhuis

1. Abhijeet Gill
6. Gavin Thind
7. Aidan Gaunt-Edwards
8. Gursehaj Johal
11. Josiah Campbell
12. Ryan McKibbin
13. Kale Simonson
16. Lachlan Scobbie
18. Caleb Fitch
19. Gauthier Callewart
20. Samuel Hoad
21. Gurnoor Bhullar
22. Abiram Yogeshwaran
29. Gurwinder Brar
30. Rajan Bahi(GK)
31. Morgan Garside(GK)
33. Paramdev Hundal
34. Navdip Chandi
China

Head Coach: (China) Yongxin Cui

1. Jinglang Liang(GK)
2. Xuehao Jiang
4. Dongze Ao
5. Jiashun Shi
6. Zixuan Ding
8. You Ao
10. Jingran Sun
12. Haolin Liang
15. Kai Li
16. Hongjun He
18. Xu Chen
19. Yubo Wang(C)
20. Yuexian Wang
21. Xuwen Zhang
23. Zhiyuan Zhang(GK)
29. Haifeng Su
30. Fuxuan Hou
39. Zuo Ao
Japan

Head Coach: (Japan) Yoshihiro Anai

2. Kazato Baba(C, GK)
4. Kentaro Nomura
5. Ryuji Tanaka
8. Haruki Sasaki
9. Koki Otsuji
10. Shogo Sasaki
11. Yuto Higuchi
12. Sei Matsubara(GK)
13. Kazuki Nakai
15. Rei Ninomiya
16. Seia Yamada
18. Tatsuaki Yasui
19. Rintaro Sakai
21. Matsuki Mori
23. Shun Hara
25. Chihiro Furusawa
30. Shota Hanayama
35. Ryosuke Shinohara
Malaysia

Head Coach: (Malaysia) Nor Saiful Zaini

1. Gagandeep Aphthar
5. A Aferullsyah
6. Nabil Yusof(C)
7. Dheeressh Gunaseelan
10. Muhammad Hafiezuddin Mohd Ali
11. Fahmi Suzaini
12. Adam Johari
14. Shelston Silverius
16. Mohamad Adib Amsyar(GK)
18. M Rahuul
20. Mohd Harieq
21. Ashrafeel Iman Muhammad
22. Haziq Hairul(GK)
24. Mohamad Syazwan Mohd Shamsul
28. Naaveenesh Panicker
30. Muhammad Salihe
34. George Eswaran
38. Iman Faizo
Pakistan

Head Coach: (Pakistan) Syed Hussain

1. Ahsan Mahmood(GK)
2. Asam Haider
7. Ghulam Mustafa
8. Rana Abdul Sami
10. Muhammad Shaheer
11. Adeel
12. Ihtesham Muhammad(GK)
13. Muhammad Farooq
14. Sami Ullah
16. Usman Ghani
17. Muhammad Yahya Najeeb
19. Saif Ullah
22. Waleed Rana
24. Fayyaz Hamza
27. Ali Ansar
35. Muhammad Ammad(C)
44. Ali Hamza
91. Muhammad Usman

Source:FIH

== Round Robin ==
All times are local (UTC+8).

=== Standings ===
Pos	Team	Pld	W	D	L	GF	GA	GD	Pts	Qualification
1	Malaysia (H)	4	4	0	0	16	5	+11	12	Final
2	Pakistan	4	2	1	1	18	10	+8	7	Final
3	Japan	4	2	1	1	16	8	+8	7	Third place game
4	Canada	4	1	0	3	7	22	−15	3	Third place game
5	China	4	0	0	4	6	18	−12	0	

Source: FIH
Rules for classification: 1) points; 2) matches won; 3) goal difference; 4) goals for; 5) head-to-head result; 6) field goals for.
(H) Hosts

17 October 2026
17:05

Pakistan	8–3	China
Saif 13'; Farooq 30'; Rana 37'; F. Hamza 39'; Mustafa 43'; Usman 44'; Haider 55', 57'	Report	Liang 15', 18'; Wang 25'

Umpires:
Yeung Chor Ming (HKG)
Yuhei Kozakai (JPN)

17 October 2026
19:35

Japan	8–1	Canada
Hanayama 15'; Higuchi 16'; Yamada 22'; Ninomiya 28'; Furusawa 30'; S. Sasaki 46'; Mori 56'; Shinohara 57'	Report	Simonson 51'

Umpires:
Salim Lucky (BAN)
Ghulam Mohieuddin (PAK)

18 October 2026
17:05

Pakistan	6–2	Canada
F. Hamza 9'; A. Hamza 14'; Sami 25'; Rana 38'; Haider 51'; Adeel 54'	Report	Bhullar 30'; Yogeshwaran 45'

Umpires:
Tianhe Ren (CHN)
Palani Kumar (MAS)

18 October 2026
19:35

Malaysia	3–0	China
Yusof 5', 28'; A Aferullsyah 57'	Report

Umpires:
Salim Lucky (BAN)
Pambavasan Manikandan (CAN)

20 October 2026
17:05

Canada	3–2	China
Chandi 2', 15'; Bhullar 47'	Report	Li 1'; Shi 60'

Umpires:
Palani Kumar (MAS)
Yuhei Kozakai (JPN)

20 October 2026
19:35

Japan	2–4	Malaysia
Mori 19'; Sakai 43'	Report	Mohd. S 27'; A Aferullsyah 51'; Panicker 56'; Gunaseelan 56'

Umpires:
Yeung Chor Ming (HKG)
Pambavasan Manikandan (CAN)

21 October 2026
17:05

China	1–4	Japan
Li 54'	Report	S. Sasaki 27', 50', 55'; H. Sasaki 52'

Umpires:
Pambavasan Manikandan (CAN)
Ghulam Mohieuddin (PAK)

21 October 2026
19:35

Pakistan	2–3	Malaysia
Adeel 36', 43'	Report	Panicker 21', 57'; Salihe 55'

Umpires:
Yeung Chor Ming (HKG)
Tianhe Ren (CHN)

23 October 2026
17:05

Japan	2–2	Pakistan
Yamada 18'; Nakai 42'	Report	F. Hamza 34'; Mustafa 43'

Umpires:
Salim Lucky (BAN)
Palani Kumar (MAS)

23 October 2026
19:35

Malaysia	6–1	Canada
Mohd. S 7'; Panicker 15'; Mohd. H 22'; M Rahuul 30'; Gunaseelan 41'; Salihe 45'	Report	Chandi 5'

Umpires:
Ghulam Mohieuddin (PAK)
Yuhei Kozakai (JPN)

== Third and fourth place ==
24 October 2026
17:05

Japan	5–0	Canada
Shinohara 4', 15', 55', 56'; Yasui 9'	Report

Umpires:
Salim Lucky (BAN)
Palani Kumar (MAS)

== Final ==
24 October 2026
20:05

Malaysia	2–2	Pakistan
Johari 25'; Gunaseelan 49'	Report	Rana 19'; Usman 23'
Penalties
Johari (penalty shoot-out scored); Aphthar (penalty shoot-out scored); M Rahuul (penalty shoot-out scored); Panicker (penalty shoot-out missed); A Aferullsyah (penalty shoot-out scored)	4–3	(penalty shoot-out missed) F. Hamza; (penalty shoot-out scored) A. Hamza; (penalty shoot-out scored) Rana; (penalty shoot-out scored) Rana; (penalty shoot-out missed) Ammad

Umpires:
Yeung Chor Ming (HKG)
Tianhe Ren (CHN)

== Statistics ==
=== Final standings ===
Pos	Team	
1	Malaysia (H)	Champions
2	Pakistan	Runners up
3	Japan	3rd place
4	Canada	
5	China	

Source: FIH
(H) Host

=== Goalscorers ===
There were 72 goals scored in 12 matches, for an average of 6 goals per match.

5 goals

- (Japan) Ryosuke Shinohara

4 goals

- (Japan) Shogo Sasaki
- (Malaysia) Naaveenesh Panicker

3 goals

- (Canada) Navdip Chandi
- (Japan) Seia Yamada
- (Malaysia) Dheeressh Gunaseelan
- (Pakistan) Adeel
- (Pakistan) Asam Haider
- (Pakistan) Fayyaz Hamza
- (Pakistan) Waleed Rana

2 goals

- (Canada) Gurnoor Bhullar
- (China) Kai Li
- (China) Haolin Liang
- (Japan) Matsuki Mori
- (Malaysia) A Aferullsyah
- (Malaysia) Mohamad Syazwan Mohd Shamsul
- (Malaysia) Muhammad Salihe
- (Malaysia) Nabil Yusof
- (Pakistan) Ghulam Mustafa
- (Pakistan) Muhammad Usman

1 goal

- (Canada) Kale Simonson
- (Canada) Abiram Yogeshwaran
- (China) Jiashun Shi
- (China) Yubo Wang
- (Japan) Chihiro Furusawa
- (Japan) Shota Hanayama
- (Japan) Yuto Higuchi
- (Japan) Rei Ninomiya
- (Japan) Rintaro Sakai
- (Japan) Haruki Sasaki
- (Japan) Tatsuaki Yasui
- (Malaysia) Adam Johari
- (Malaysia) M Rahuul
- (Malaysia) Muhammad Hafiezuddin Mohd Ali
- (Pakistan) Muhammad Farooq
- (Pakistan) Ali Hamza
- (Pakistan) Saif Ullah
- (Pakistan) Rana Abdul Sami

Source: FIH

== See also ==
- Sultan of Johor Cup
- List of hockey world championships
- Other hockey championships
