= 2013 Sultan of Johor Cup =

Field hockey tournament

Tournament details
- Host country: Malaysia
- City: Johor Bahru
- Dates: 22–29 September
- Teams: 6 (from 3 confederations)
- Venue: Taman Daya Hockey Stadium

Final positions
- Champions: India (1st title)
- Runner-up: Malaysia
- Third place: Argentina

Tournament statistics
- Matches played: 18
- Goals scored: 83 (4.61 per match)
- Top scorer: (Malaysia) Shahril Saabah (8 goals)

The 2013 Sultan of Johor Cup was the third edition of the Sultan of Johor Cup. It was held in Johor Bahru, Johor, Malaysia from 22 to 29 September 2013.

The number of teams for this year's cup is the same compared to the previous tournament where six teams competed.

India defeated Malaysia 3–0 in the final match to win the cup.

== Participating nations ==
Six countries are participating in this year's tournament:

- Malaysia (Host)
- Argentina
- England
- India
- South Korea
- Pakistan

== Results ==
All times are in Malaysia Standard Time (UTC+08:00).

=== Pool ===
Pos	Team	Pld	W	D	L	GF	GA	GD	Pts	Qualification
1	India	5	4	1	0	18	7	+11	13	Final
2	Malaysia (H)	5	4	1	0	19	9	+10	13	Final
3	Pakistan	5	3	0	2	15	11	+4	9	Third place game
4	Argentina	5	1	1	3	10	13	−3	4	Third place game
5	England	5	1	0	4	8	17	−9	3	Fifth place game
6	South Korea	5	0	1	4	7	20	−13	1	Fifth place game

Source: FIH
(H) Hosts

22 September 2013
16:00 MST

South Korea	0–3	Pakistan
	Report	Dilber 46', 53'; Umair 53'

22 September 2013
18:00 MST

England	1–2	India
French 66'	Report	Ramandeep 6'; Talwinder 50'

22 September 2013
20:00 MST

Malaysia	4–2	Argentina
Shahril 7', 38'; Azwar 22'; Rashid 48'	Report	18'; Ibarra 64'

23 September 2013
16:00 MST

England	2–6	Pakistan
Gall 5'; Taylor 15'	Report	Tousiq 11', 20'; Dilber 35+', 69'; Ayub 54'; Suleman 62'

23 September 2013
18:00 MST

Argentina	2–3	India
Ibarra 16', 42'	Report	Yousuf 23'; Ramandeep 60', 62'

23 September 2013
20:00 MST

Malaysia	5–1	South Korea
Fitri 12'; Shahril 38'; Zulhairi 47'; Syamim 64'; Baharom 69'	Report	Seo 67'

25 September 2013
16:00 MST

Argentina	2–2	South Korea
Martínez 30'; 70+'	Report	Hwang 52'; 69'

25 September 2013
18:00 MST

Malaysia	3–1	England
Shahril 9', 56'; Izad 43'	Report	Bull 60'

25 September 2013
20:00 MST

India	4–0	Pakistan
Sukhmanjit 37', 46'; I. Khan 45'; Ramandeep 61'	Report

26 September 2013
16:00 MST

England	0–3	Argentina
	Report	Paz 34'; Ruiz 46'; Fernández Onega 60'

26 September 2013
18:00 MST

South Korea	1–6	India
You S. 34'	Report	Rohidas 7'; Satbir 10'; Talwinder 31'; Tirkey 56'; Ramandeep 62'; Yousuf 65'

26 September 2013
20:00 MST

Malaysia	4–2	Pakistan
Zulhairi 28'; Shahril 40'; Fitri 52'; Syamim 63'	Report	Dilber 25'; Tousiq 48'

28 September 2013
16:00 MST

Argentina	1–4	Pakistan
Fernández Pizarro 47'	Report	Butt 6'; Qadir 14'; Dilber 31', 32'

28 September 2013
18:00 MST

India	3–3	Malaysia
Satbir 10'; Ramandeep 33'; Yousuf 69'	Report	Shahril 62', 68'; Baharom 64'

28 September 2013
20:00 MST

South Korea	3–4	England
Seo 7'; You S. 18'; You M. 25'	Report	Gilham-Jones 46'; Taylor 52'; Sharp 68'; Drayton-Chana 69'

=== Classification round ===
==== Fifth and sixth place ====
29 September 2013
15:30 MST

England	0–6	South Korea
	Report	Seo 6', 28'; You S. 18', 44'; You M. 58'; Ji 62'

==== Third and fourth place ====
29 September 2013
18:00 MST

Pakistan	0–0	Argentina
	Report
Penalties
Suleman (penalty shoot-out missed); Qadir (penalty shoot-out missed); Dilber (penalty shoot-out missed)	0–3	(penalty shoot-out scored) Cicileo; (penalty shoot-out scored) Fernández; (penalty shoot-out missed) Martínez; (penalty shoot-out scored) Trezza

==== Final ====
29 September 2013
20:30 MST

India	3–0	Malaysia
Tirkey 22'; Yousuf 55'; Manpreet 65'	Report

== Final standings ==
1. India
2. Malaysia
3. Argentina
4. Pakistan
5. South Korea
6. England
