= 2013 Men's Hockey Junior World Cup =

10th edition of the Men's Hockey Junior World Cup

Tournament details
- Host country: India
- City: New Delhi
- Teams: 16 (from 5 confederations)
- Venue: Dhyan Chand National Stadium

Final positions
- Champions: Germany (6th title)
- Runner-up: France
- Third place: Netherlands

Tournament statistics
- Matches played: 44
- Goals scored: 223 (5.07 per match)
- Top scorer: (Germany) Christopher Rühr (9 goals)
- Best player: (Germany) Christopher Rühr
- Best goalkeeper: (France) Edgar Reynaud

The 2013 Men's Hockey Junior World Cup was the 10th edition of the Hockey Junior World Cup for men, an international field hockey tournament. It was held between 6 and 15 December 2013 in New Delhi, India.

Germany won the tournament for the sixth time after defeating France 5–2 in the final, who participated in their first ever final in a top international event. The Netherlands won the third place match by defeating Malaysia 7–2.

== Qualification ==
Each continental federation got a number of quotas depending on the FIH World Rankings for teams qualified through their junior continental championships. Alongside the host nation, 16 teams will compete in the tournament.

Dates	Event	Location	Quotas	Qualifier(s)
—N/a	Host nation	—N/a	1	India
3–13 May 2012	2012 Junior Asia Cup	Malacca, Malaysia	3	Malaysia; Pakistan; South Korea
26 August – 1 September 2012	2012 EuroHockey Junior Championship	's-Hertogenbosch, Netherlands	6	Belgium; Netherlands; Germany; France; England; Spain
10–23 September 2012	2012 Pan American Junior Championship	Guadalajara, Mexico	2	Argentina; Canada
13–21 October 2012	2012 Junior Africa Cup for Nations	Randburg, South Africa	2	South Africa; Egypt
25 February – 3 March 2013	2013 Junior Oceania Cup	Gold Coast, Australia	2	Australia; New Zealand
Total			16	

== First round ==
All times are Indian Standard Time (UTC+05:30)

=== Pool A ===
Pos	Team	Pld	W	D	L	GF	GA	GD	Pts	Qualification
1	Belgium	3	2	1	0	10	3	+7	7	Quarter-finals
2	Germany	3	2	0	1	13	4	+9	6	Quarter-finals
3	Pakistan	3	1	1	1	6	10	−4	4	
4	Egypt	3	0	0	3	2	14	−12	0	

Source: FIH
Rules for classification: 1) points; 2) goal difference; 3) goals scored; 4) head-to-head result.

6 December 2013
14:30

Germany	1–3	Belgium
Rühr 62'	Report	Capelle 30', 45'; Van Linthoudt 70'

Umpires:
Eric Koh Kim Lai (MAS)
Grant Hundley (USA)

6 December 2013
18:00

Pakistan	3–2	Egypt
Irfan 4'; Butt 30'; Tousiq 66'	Report	Mohsen 60'; Ragab 63'

Umpires:
David Tomlinson (NZL)
Benjamin Mauss (FRA)

7 December 2013
14:00

Belgium	5–0	Egypt
Hendrickx 38', 51', 66'; Cobbaert 48', 54'	Report

Umpires:
Paul Walker (ENG)
Fernando Gomez (ARG)

7 December 2013
16:00

Pakistan	1–6	Germany
Butt 70'	Report	Rühr 2', 18', 26'; Windfeder 10'; Schöllkopf 59'; Bruns 69'

Umpires:
Jonas van't Hek (NED)
Tim Pullman (AUS)

10 December 2013
14:00

Germany	6–0	Egypt
4'; Bruns 19', 68'; Rühr 42', 56'; Müller 52'	Report

Umpires:
Fernando Gomez (ARG)
Javed Shaikh (IND)

10 December 2013
16:00

Belgium	2–2	Pakistan
Plennevaux 60', 65'	Report	Dilber 41', 54'

Umpires:
Janas van't Hek (NED)
Eric Koh Kim Lai (MAS)

=== Pool B ===
Pos	Team	Pld	W	D	L	GF	GA	GD	Pts	Qualification
1	Australia	3	3	0	0	9	2	+7	9	Quarter-finals
2	France	3	2	0	1	7	7	0	6	Quarter-finals
3	Argentina	3	1	0	2	5	8	−3	3	
4	Spain	3	0	0	3	3	7	−4	0	

Source: FIH
Rules for classification: 1) points; 2) goal difference; 3) goals scored; 4) head-to-head result.

6 December 2013
14:00

Australia	5–2	Argentina
Douglas 14'; Main 16'; Beale 17'; Hayward 42'; Hammond 49'	Report	Coelho 31'; Peillat 64'

Umpires:
Gareth Greenfield (NZL)
Mike Gerwig (GER)

6 December 2013
17:00

Spain	3–4	France
Iglesias 19'; Beltrán 23'; Sánchez 63'	Report	Genestet 23'; Martin-Brisac 24', 28'; P. van Straaten 38'

Umpires:
Javed Shaikh (IND)
Daniel Lopez Ramos (URU)

8 December 2013
14:00

Australia	2–0	Spain
Beale 38'; Wotherspoon 63'	Report

Umpires:
Peter Wright (RSA)
Daniel Lopez Ramos (URU)

8 December 2013
16:00

Argentina	2–3	France
Pérez Pesado 20'; Peillat 35'	Report	P. van Straaten 25'; Ponthieu 31'; Kieffer 48'

Umpires:
Paul Walker (ENG)
Eric Koh Kim Lai (MAS)

9 December 2013
14:00

Argentina	1–0	Spain
Sacchetti 46'	Report

Umpires:
Gareth Greenfield (NZL)
Ahmed Elsayed Ahmed (EGY)

9 December 2013
16:00

Australia	2–0	France
Main 37'; Joyce 52'	Report

Umpires:
Raghu Prasad (IND)
Lim Zhen Hong (SIN)

=== Pool C ===
Pos	Team	Pld	W	D	L	GF	GA	GD	Pts	Qualification
1	Netherlands	3	3	0	0	13	4	+9	9	Quarter-finals
2	South Korea	3	1	1	1	12	10	+2	4	Quarter-finals
3	India (H)	3	1	1	1	8	8	0	4	
4	Canada	3	0	0	3	6	17	−11	0	

Source: FIH
Rules for classification: 1) points; 2) goal difference; 3) goals scored; 4) head-to-head result.
(H) Hosts

6 December 2013
12:00

South Korea	7 – 4	Canada
Seo In-woo 2', 16', 37'; You Seung-ju 7', 31', 42'; You Min-young 49'	Report	Sandhu 22'; Johnston 52'; Mahal 58'; Scholfield 59'

Umpires:
Fernando Gomez (ARG)
Ahmed Elsayed Ahmed (EGY)

6 December 2013
20:00

Netherlands	3 – 2	India
Van Baal 3', 28'; Rijkers 25'	Report	Gurjinder 13'; Akashdeep 42'

Umpires:
Tim Pullman (AUS)
Peter Wright (RSA)

7 December 2013
18:00

South Korea	2 – 3	Netherlands
Seo In-woo 17'; You Seung-ju 27'	Report	Brinkman 4'; Algera 25'; Van Baal 39'

Umpires:
Mike Gerwig (GER)
Marcelo Servetto (ARG)

7 December 2013
20:00

India	3 – 2	Canada
Mandeep 30'; Akashdeep 57'; Gurjinder 69'	Report	Panesar 3'; Johnston 51'

Umpires:
Haider Rasool (PAK)
David Tomlinson (NZL)

10 December 2013
18:00

Netherlands	7 – 0	Canada
Hiebendaal 20'; Van Kan 21'; Van Baal 23', 47'; Bovendeert 34', 64'; Algera 57'	Report

Umpires:
Paul Walker (ENG)
David Tomlinson (NZL)

10 December 2013
20:00

India	3 – 3	South Korea
Gurjinder 32', 35'; Mandeep 45'	Report	You Seung-ju 16', 58', 60'

Umpires:
Marcelo Servetto (ARG)
Peter Wright (RSA)

=== Pool D ===
Pos	Team	Pld	W	D	L	GF	GA	GD	Pts	Qualification
1	Malaysia	3	3	0	0	9	5	+4	9	Quarter-finals
2	New Zealand	3	1	1	1	5	5	0	4	Quarter-finals
3	South Africa	3	1	0	2	3	4	−1	3	
4	England	3	0	1	2	5	8	−3	1	

Source: FIH
Rules for classification: 1) points; 2) goal difference; 3) goals scored; 4) head-to-head result.

6 December 2013
16:00

New Zealand	2 – 3	Malaysia
Russell 11', 47'	Report	Saabah 6'; Baharom 37'; Ashaari 63'

Umpires:
Diego Estebanez (ESP)
Raghu Prasad (IND)

6 December 2013
19:30

England	1 – 2	South Africa
Goodfield 14'	Report	Manson 34'; Swanpoel 59'

Umpires:
Lim Hong Zhen (SIN)
Jonas van't Hek (NED)

8 December 2013
18:00

South Africa	1 – 2	Malaysia
Brown 13'	Report	27'; Ashaari 43'

Umpires:
Marcelo Servetto (ARG)
Diego Estebanez (ESP)

8 December 2013
20:00

New Zealand	2 – 2	England
Russell 69'; Rees-Gibbs 68'	Report	Ja. Gall 14'; Taylor 27'

Umpires:
Javed Shaikh (IND)
Grant Hundley (USA)

9 December 2013
18:00

England	2 – 4	Malaysia
Taylor 31'; Roper 65'	Report	Hashim 15'; Ashaari 26'; Baharom 44'; Saari 57'

Umpires:
Tim Pullman (AUS)
Benjamin Mauss (FRA)

9 December 2013
20:00

South Africa	0 – 1	New Zealand
	Report	Russell 44'

Umpires:
Haider Rasool (PAK)
Mike Gerwig (GER)

== Classification round ==
=== Thirteenth to sixteenth place classification ===
Cross-overs
12 December
England	6
Egypt	1
12 December
Spain	3
Canada	2

Thirteenth place
14 December
England	2
Spain	3
Fifteenth place
14 December
Egypt	3
Canada	0

=== Crossover ===
12 December 2013
11:30

Egypt	1 – 6	England
Mohamed 10'	Report	Gall 41'; Taylor 44'; Bandurak 48', 60'; Goodfield 51'; Bull 66'

Umpires:
Benjamin Mauss (FRA)
David Tomlinson (NZL)

12 December 2013
14:00

Spain	3 – 2	Canada
30'; Llorens 35'; Mercade 61'	Report	Ho-Garcia 24'; Bissettt 64'

Umpires:
Haider Rasool (PAK)
Ahmed Elsayed Ahmed (EGY)

=== Fifteenth and sixteenth place ===
14 December 2013
13:15

Egypt	3 – 0	Canada
Karem 32'; Said 67'; Ahmed 70'	Report

Umpires:
Daniel Lopez Ramos (URU)
Benjamin Mauss (FRA)

=== Thirteenth and fourteenth place ===
14 December 2013
15:30

England	2 – 3	Spain
Proctor 27'; Bull 45'	Report	Beltrán 5'; Mercade 19'; De Frutos 68'

Umpires:
David Tomlinson (NZL)
Mike Gerwig (GER)

=== Ninth to twelfth place classification ===
Cross-overs
12 December
Pakistan	4
South Africa	0
12 December
Argentina	2
India	4

Ninth place
14 December
Pakistan (s.o.)	1 (4)
India	1 (2)
Eleventh place
14 December
South Africa	1
Argentina	4

==== Cross-overs ====
12 December 2013
16:30

Pakistan	4 – 0	South Africa
Dilber 8'; Butt 42', 44'; Irfan 61'	Report

Umpires:
Daniel Lopez Ramos (URU)
Raghu Prasad (IND)

12 December 2013
19:00

Argentina	2 – 4	India
Martinez 38'; Diaz 69'	Report	Ramandeep 4', 31'; Rohidas 7'; Gurjinder 40'

Umpires:
Lim Hong Zhen (SIN)
Grant Hundley (USA)

==== Eleventh and twelfth place ====
14 December 2013
17:45

South Africa	1 – 4	Argentina
Brown 3'	Report	Peillat 13', 42'; Diaz 21'; Coelho 24'

Umpires:
Ahmed Elsayed Ahmed (EGY)
Diego Estebanez (ESP)

==== Ninth and tenth place ====
14 December 2013
20:00

Pakistan	1 – 1	India
Ali 7'	Report	Gurjinder 66'
Penalties
Irfan (penalty shoot-out scored); Tousiq (penalty shoot-out scored); Rizwan (penalty shoot-out missed); Bhutta (penalty shoot-out scored); Dilber (penalty shoot-out scored)	4 – 2	(penalty shoot-out scored) Gurjinder; (penalty shoot-out scored) Talwinder; (penalty shoot-out missed) Khan; (penalty shoot-out missed) Satbir

Umpires:
Jonas van't Hek (NED)
Paul Walker (ENG)

== Medal round ==
=== Bracket ===
Quarter-finals
12 December
Belgium	4
France	5
12 December
Malaysia	2
South Korea	1
12 December
Australia	3
Germany	4
12 December
Netherlands	3
New Zealand	2

Semi-finals
13 December
France (s.o.)	1 (3)
Malaysia	1 (1)
13 December
Germany	5
Netherlands	3

Final
15 December
France	2
Germany	5
Third place
15 December
Malaysia	2
Netherlands	7

=== Quarter-finals ===
12 December 2013
11:00

Netherlands	3 – 2	New Zealand
Brinkman 28', 39'; Hiebendaal 42'	Report	Woods 38' van Woerkom 60'

Umpires:
Javed Shaikh (IND)
Diego Estebanez (ESP)

12 December 2013
13:15

Belgium	4 – 5	France
29'; Plennevaux 37', 47'; Thiery 42'	Report	Charlet 15'; Genestet 40'; Kieffer 48', 65'; Ponthieu 58'

Umpires:
Mike Gerwig (GER)
Paul Walker (ENG)

12 December 2013
15:30

Malaysia	2 – 1	South Korea
Shahril 18', 62'	Report	You Seung-ju 29'

Umpires:
Gareth Greenfield (NZL)
Tim Pullman (AUS)

12 December 2013
17:45

Australia	3 – 4	Germany
Gilmour 8'; Wotherspoon 57', 69'	Report	Rühr 21'; Linnekogel 55'; Grambusch 58'; Wellen 65'

Umpires:
Marcelo Servetto (ARG)
Jonas van't Hek (NED)

=== Fifth to eighth place classification ===
Cross-overs
13 December
Belgium	6
South Korea	1
13 December
Australia	2
New Zealand	1

Fifth place
15 December
Belgium	2 (2)
Australia (s.o.)	2 (3)
Seventh place
15 December
South Korea	2
New Zealand	4

==== Cross-overs ====
13 December 2013
13:15

Belgium	6 – 1	South Korea
Hendrickx 27'; Plennevaux 39'; Cobbaert 40'; Perez 45'; Capelle 46'; Thiery 68'	Report	Nam Yun-seon 64'

Umpires:
Haider Rasool (PAK)
Lim Zhen Hong (SIN)

13 December 2013
17:45

Australia	2 – 1	New Zealand
Joyce 23'; Wotherspoon 44'	Report	Panchia 20'

Umpires:
Fernando Gomez (ARG)
Eric Koh Kim Lai (MAS)

==== Seventh and eighth place ====
15 December 2013
13:15

South Korea	2 – 4	New Zealand
You Min-young 13'; 26'	Report	Morris 11'; Russell 17', 32', 70'

Umpires:
Raghu Prasad (IND)
Grant Hundley (USA)

==== Fifth and sixth place ====
15 December 2013
15:30

Belgium	2 – 2	Australia
Plennevaux 25'; Van Linthoudt 41'	Report	Beale 39'; Hayward 46'
Penalties
Plennevaux (penalty shoot-out scored); Capelle (penalty shoot-out missed); Van Doren (penalty shoot-out missed); Cobbaert (penalty shoot-out scored); Cuvelier (penalty shoot-out missed)	2 – 3	(penalty shoot-out scored) Beale; (penalty shoot-out missed) Joyce; (penalty shoot-out scored) Wotherspoon; (penalty shoot-out scored) Dawson; (penalty shoot-out missed) Hayward

Umpires:
Eric Koh Kim Lai (MAS)
Fernando Gomez (ARG)

=== First to fourth place classification ===
==== Semi-finals ====
13 December 2013
15:30

France	1–1	Malaysia
Kieffer 63'	Report	Hassan 4'
Penalties
P. van Straaten (penalty shoot-out missed); Martin-Brisac (penalty shoot-out scored); Baumgarten (penalty shoot-out scored); Lockwood (penalty shoot-out missed); Genestet (penalty shoot-out scored)	3 – 1	(penalty shoot-out scored) Jali; (penalty shoot-out missed) Mohd Yusof; (penalty shoot-out missed) Ashaari; (penalty shoot-out missed) Saabah

Umpires:
Marcelo Servetto (ARG)
Gareth Greenfield (NZL)

13 December 2013
20:00

Germany	5–3	Netherlands
Windfeder 4', 14'; Rühr 47'; Kapaun 66'; Wellen 68'	Report	Hiebendaal 49', 60'; Brinkman 50'

Umpires:
Tim Pullman (AUS)
Peter Wright (RSA)

==== Third and fourth place ====
15 December 2013
17:45

Malaysia	2 – 7	Netherlands
Hashim 7', 60'	Report	Bovendeert 3'; Brinkman 6', 28'; Hiebendaal 18', 37'; Van Baal 23'; Galema 52'

Umpires:
Javed Shaikh (IND)
Gareth Greenfield (NZL)

==== Final ====
15 December 2013
20:00

France	2 – 5	Germany
Baumgarten 16', 40'	Report	Wellen 2', 44', 46'; Gomoll 60'; Rühr 68'

Umpires:
Tim Pullman (AUS)
Peter Wright (RSA)

== Awards ==
Top Goalscorer	Player of the Tournament	Goalkeeper of the Tournament
(Germany) Christopher Rühr	(Germany) Christopher Rühr	(France) Edgar Reynaud

== Statistics ==
=== Final standings ===
As per statistical convention in field hockey, matches decided in extra time are counted as wins and losses, while matches decided by penalty shoot-outs are counted as draws.

Pos	Team	Pld	W	D	L	GF	GA	GD	Pts	Final Standings
1st place, gold medalist(s)	Germany	6	5	0	1	27	12	+15	15	Gold Medal
2nd place, silver medalist(s)	France	6	3	1	2	15	17	−2	10	Silver Medal
3rd place, bronze medalist(s)	Netherlands	6	5	0	1	26	13	+13	15	Bronze Medal
4	Malaysia	6	4	1	1	14	14	0	13	Fourth place
5	Australia	6	4	1	1	16	9	+7	13	Eliminated in Quarter-finals
6	Belgium	6	3	2	1	22	11	+11	11	Eliminated in Quarter-finals
7	New Zealand	6	2	1	3	12	12	0	7	Eliminated in Quarter-finals
8	South Korea	6	1	1	4	16	22	−6	4	Eliminated in Quarter-finals
9	Pakistan	5	2	2	1	11	11	0	8	Eliminated in Pool stage
10	India	5	2	2	1	13	11	+2	8	Eliminated in Pool stage
11	Argentina	5	2	0	3	11	13	−2	6	Eliminated in Pool stage
12	South Africa	5	1	0	4	4	12	−8	3	Eliminated in Pool stage
13	Spain	5	2	0	3	9	11	−2	6	Eliminated in Pool stage
14	England	5	1	1	3	13	12	+1	4	Eliminated in Pool stage
15	Egypt	5	1	0	4	6	20	−14	3	Eliminated in Pool stage
16	Canada	5	0	0	5	8	23	−15	0	Eliminated in Pool stage

Source: FIH

=== Goalscorers ===
There were 223 goals scored in 44 matches, for an average of 5.07 goals per match.

9 goals

- (Germany) Christopher Rühr

8 goals

- (South Korea) You Seung-Ju

7 goals

- (New Zealand) Kane Russell

6 goals

- (Belgium) Maxime Plennevaux
- (India) Gurjinder Singh
- (France) Jean-Laurent Kieffer
- (Netherlands) Thierry Brinkman
- (Netherlands) Tom Hiebendaal
- (Netherlands) Milan van Baal

5 goals

- (Germany) Niklas Wellen

4 goals

- (Argentina) Gonzalo Peillat
- (Australia) Dylan Wotherspoon
- (Belgium) Alexander Hendrickx
- (Pakistan) Ammad Shakeel Butt
- (South Korea) Seo In-Woo

3 goals

- (Australia) Daniel Beale
- (Belgium) Maxime Capelle
- (Belgium) Mathew Cobbaert
- (England) Luke Taylor
- (Germany) Niklas Bruns
- (Germany) Lukas Windfeder
- (Malaysia) Firhan Ashaari
- (Netherlands) Roel Bovandeert
- (Pakistan) Muhammed Dilber

2 goals

- (Argentina) Joaquin Coelho
- (Argentina) Lautaro Díaz
- (Australia) Jeremy Hayward
- (Australia) Cameron Joyce
- (Australia) Frank Main
- (Belgium) Dorian Thiery
- (Belgium) Alexandre van Linthoudt
- (Canada) Gordon Johnston
- (England) Nicholas Bandurak
- (England) Andrew Bull
- (England) James Gall
- (England) David Goodfield
- (France) Gaspard Baumgarten
- (France) Hugo Genestet
- (France) Simon Martin-Brisac
- (France) Théophile Ponthieu
- (France) Pieter van Straaten
- (India) Akashdeep Singh
- (India) Mandeep Singh
- (India) Ramandeep Singh
- (Malaysia) Muhammed Bin Baharom
- (Malaysia) Zulhairi Hashim
- (Malaysia) Shahril Saabah
- (Netherlands) Tristan Algera
- (Pakistan) Mohammad Irfan
- (South Africa) Matthew Brown
- (South Korea) You Min-Young
- (Spain) Albert Beltrán
- (Spain) Lluis Mercade

1 goal

- (Argentina) Lucas Martínez
- (Argentina) Estanislao Pérez Pesado
- (Argentina) Manuel Sacchetti
- (Australia) Justin Douglas
- (Australia) Will Gilmour
- (Australia) Casey Hammond
- (Belgium) Gaetan Pérez
- (Canada) Brenden Bissett
- (Canada) Gabriel Ho-Garcia
- (Canada) Jannu Mahal
- (Canada) Sukhi Panesar
- (Canada) Vikramjeet Sandhu
- (Canada) Oliver Scholfield
- (Egypt) Reda Ahmed
- (Egypt) Ahmed Karem
- (Egypt) Ramy Mohamed
- (Egypt) Ahmed Mohsen
- (Egypt) Mohamed Ragab
- (Egypt) Ashraf Said
- (England) Christopher Proctor
- (England) Phil Roper
- (France) Victor Charlet
- (Germany) Jonas Gomoll
- (Germany) Mats Grambusch
- (Germany) Max Kapaun
- (Germany) Dieter Linnekogel
- (Germany) Mathias Müller
- (Germany) Alexander Schöllkopf
- (India) Amit Rohidas
- (Malaysia) Mohd Bin Hashim
- (Malaysia) Azri Hassan
- (Malaysia) Muhammed Bin Saabah
- (Malaysia) Fitri Saari
- (Netherlands) Jelle Galema
- (Netherlands) Mark Rijkers
- (Netherlands) Rik van Kan
- (New Zealand) Jeremy Morris
- (New Zealand) Jared Panchia
- (New Zealand) Matt Rees-Gibbs
- (New Zealand) Benedict van Woerkom
- (New Zealand) Nic Woods
- (Pakistan) Rizwan Ali
- (Pakistan) Muhammad Tousiq
- (South Africa) Andrew Manson
- (South Africa) Dylan Swanpoel
- (South Korea) Nam Yun-Seon
- (Spain) Alejandro de Frutos
- (Spain) Álvaro Iglesias
- (Spain) Borja Llorens
- (Spain) Ricardo Sánchez

1 own goal

- Canada (against Spain)
- Egypt (against Germany)
- France (against Belgium)
- New Zealand (against South Korea)
- South Africa (against Malaysia)

Source: FIH

== See also ==
- 2013 Women's Hockey Junior World Cup
