= 2015 Sultan of Johor Cup =

Malaysian field hockey tournament

Tournament details
- Host country: Malaysia
- City: Johor Bahru
- Dates: 11–18 October
- Teams: 6 (from 4 confederations)
- Venue(s): Taman Daya Hockey Stadium

Final positions
- Champions: Great Britain (1st title)
- Runner-up: India
- Third place: Malaysia

Tournament statistics
- Matches played: 18
- Goals scored: 79 (4.39 per match)
- Top scorer(s): (United Kingdom) Luke Taylor (10 goals)

The 2015 Sultan of Johor Cup was the fifth edition of the Sultan of Johor Cup. It was held in Johor Bahru, Johor, Malaysia from 11 to 18 October 2015.

The number of teams for this year's cup is the same compared to the previous tournament where six teams competed. New Zealand who competed previously, will not join this edition and Argentina had been invited.

Great Britain defeated India 4–3 in a penalty shootout after being tied 2–2 in the final match to win the cup.

== Participating nations ==
Six countries are participating in this year's tournament:

- Malaysia (Host)
- Argentina
- Australia
- Great Britain
- India
- Pakistan

== Results ==
All times are in Malaysia Standard Time (UTC+08:00).

=== Pool ===
Pos	Team	Pld	W	D	L	GF	GA	GD	Pts	Qualification
1	India	5	4	0	1	14	8	+6	12	Final
2	Great Britain	5	3	2	0	15	9	+6	11	Final
3	Malaysia (H)	5	2	1	2	11	11	0	7	Third place game
4	Argentina	5	2	1	2	8	9	−1	7	Third place game
5	Australia	5	1	1	3	12	11	+1	4	Fifth place game
6	Pakistan	5	0	1	4	5	17	−12	1	Fifth place game

Source: FIH
(H) Hosts

11 October 2015
16:35

Argentina	1–0	Australia
Gencarelli 65'	Report

Umpires:
Diego Estebanez (ESP)
Latif Hazif Atif (PAK)

11 October 2015
18:35

India	5–1	Pakistan
Yadav 5'; Sumit 23'; Qureshi 27'; Parvinder 34'; Santa 60'	Report	Dilber 45'

Umpires:
Nick Bennett (ENG)
Ben Gontgen (GER)

11 October 2015
20:35

Malaysia	2–4	Great Britain
Azwar 48'; Shahril 50'	Report	Taylor 32', 62', 68'; Gleeson 44'

Umpires:
Jeremy Coleman (AUS)
Federico Silva (ARG)

12 October 2015
16:35

Australia	6–2	Pakistan
Scanlon 8', 12'; Beltz 27'; Hendry 29', 70+'; Welch 63'	Report	Ali 31', 41'

Umpires:
Rawi Anbananthan (MAS)
Dhaval Prajapati (IND)

12 October 2015
18:35

Great Britain	4–3	India
Simpson 6'; Taylor 30', 68'; Clee 47'	Report	Sumit 17', 26'; Manpreet 29'

Umpires:
Ben Gontgen (GER)
Federico Silva (ARG)

12 October 2015
20:35

Malaysia	2–2	Argentina
Shahril 6', 32'	Report	Domene 26', 61'

Umpires:
Nick Bennett (ENG)
Latif Hazif Atif (PAK)

14 October 2015
16:35

Great Britain	0–0	Pakistan
	Report

Umpires:
Diego Estebanez (ESP)
Dhaval Prajapati (IND)

14 October 2015
18:35

Argentina	2–3	India
Casella 39'; Keenan 54'	Report	Qureshi 3'; Gurjant 11'; Nilakanta 50'

Umpires:
Rawi Anbananthan (MAS)
Jeremy Coleman (AUS)

14 October 2015
20:35

Australia	2–3	Malaysia
Gerard 43'; Hendry 63'	Report	Shahril 5'; Norsyafiq 38'; Najmi 55'

Umpires:
Nick Bennett (ENG)
Federico Silva (ARG)

15 October 2015
16:35

Pakistan	1–3	Argentina
Qasim 68'	Report	Casella 22', 27', 37'

Umpires:
Ben Gontgen (GER)
Dhaval Prajapati (IND)

15 October 2015
18:35

Great Britain	4–4	Australia
Clee 8'; Taylor 27', 35+'; Waller 67'	Report	Proctor 31'; Gerrard 55'; Gale 65'; Scanlon 70+'

Umpires:
Rawi Anbananthan (MAS)
Latif Hazif Atif (PAK)

15 October 2015
20:35

India	2–1	Malaysia
Harmanpreet 41', 56'	Report	Shahril 68'

Umpires:
Diego Estebanez (ESP)
Jeremy Coleman (AUS)

17 October 2015
16:35

Argentina	0–3	Great Britain
	Report	Taylor 14', 37'; French 24'

Umpires:
Ben Gontgen (GER)
Jeremy Coleman (AUS)

17 October 2015
18:35

Australia	0–1	India
	Report	Harmanpreet 42'

Umpires:
Nick Bennett (ENG)
Latif Hazif Atif (PAK)

17 October 2015
20:35

Pakistan	1–3	Malaysia
Mahmood 68'	Report	Shahril 4', 62'; Najmi 7'

Umpires:
Federico Silva (ARG)
Diego Estebanez (ESP)

=== Classification ===
==== Fifth and sixth place ====
18 October 2015
15:05

Australia	5–0	Pakistan
Hendry 8'; Welch 19'; Lovett 45', 65'; Proctor 49'	Report

Umpires:
Federico Silva (ARG)
Nick Bennett (ENG)

==== Third and fourth place ====
18 October 2015
17:35

Malaysia	3–2	Argentina
Shahril 7'; Najmi 17', 41'	Report	Tarazona 10'; Keenan 52'

Umpires:
Jeremy Coleman (AUS)
Dhaval Prajapati (IND)

==== Final ====
18 October 2015
20:35

India	2–2	Great Britain
Harmanpreet 12'; Gurjant 42'	Report	Taylor 5'; Turner 46'
Penalties
Harjeet (penalty shoot-out scored); Parvinder (penalty shoot-out missed); Gurjant (penalty shoot-out missed); Harmanpreet (penalty shoot-out scored); Nilakanta (penalty shoot-out missed); Harjeet (penalty shoot-out scored); Parvinder (penalty shoot-out missed)	3–4	(penalty shoot-out scored) Horler; (penalty shoot-out missed) Pavis; (penalty shoot-out missed) Albery; (penalty shoot-out scored) Clee; (penalty shoot-out missed) Griffiths; (penalty shoot-out scored) Horler; (penalty shoot-out scored) Clee

Umpires:
Ben Gontgen (GER)
Rawi Anbananthan (MAS)

== Final standings ==
1. Great Britain
2. India
3. Malaysia
4. Argentina
5. Australia
6. Pakistan
