= 2011 Sultan of Johor Cup =

Field hockey tournament

Tournament details
- Host country: Malaysia
- City: Johor Bahru
- Dates: 5–12 November
- Teams: 6 (from 2 confederations)
- Venue: Taman Daya Hockey Stadium

Final positions
- Champions: Malaysia (1st title)
- Runner-up: Australia
- Third place: South Korea

Tournament statistics
- Matches played: 18
- Goals scored: 86 (4.78 per match)
- Top scorer: (Malaysia) Noor Faeez Ibrahim (7 goals)

The 2011 Sultan of Johor Cup was the first edition of the Sultan of Johor Cup. It was held in Johor Bahru, Johor, Malaysia from 5 to 12 November 2011.

Malaysia defeated Australia 3–2 through golden goal after being tied 2–2 in the final match to win the cup.

== Participating nations ==
Six countries participated in this year's tournament:

- Malaysia (Host)
- Australia
- South Korea
- India
- New Zealand
- Pakistan

== Results ==
All times are in Malaysia Standard Time (UTC+08:00).

=== Preliminary round ===
Pos	Team	Pld	W	D	L	GF	GA	GD	Pts	Qualification
1	Australia	5	4	0	1	19	10	+9	12	Final
2	Malaysia (H)	5	3	1	1	13	7	+6	10	Final
3	South Korea	5	3	0	2	15	16	−1	9	Third place game
4	India	5	2	0	3	14	16	−2	6	Third place game
5	New Zealand	5	1	1	3	5	11	−6	4	Fifth place game
6	Pakistan	5	1	0	4	6	12	−6	3	Fifth place game

Source: FIH
(H) Hosts

5 November 2011
16:05

South Korea	6–4	India
Yang Ji-hun 39', 48', 56'; Yoon Dong-hyeon 41', 42'; Hwang Tae-il 59'	Report	Kumar 4'; Malak 16', 29'; Talwinder 31'

Umpires:
Amir Hamzah Khan (PAK)
Mark Rippin (NZL)

5 November 2011
18:05

New Zealand	1–0	Pakistan
Ross 7'	Report

Umpires:
Michael Elmer (AUT)
Harsha Gandham (IND)

5 November 2011
20:05

Australia	2–1	Malaysia
Shaw 21'; Walters 62'	Report	Faeez 70+'

Umpires:
Dan Barstow (ENG)
Shin Dong-yun (KOR)

6 November 2011
16:05

South Korea	2–1	Pakistan
Yang Ji-hun 20'; Lee Jung-jun 22'	Report	Adnan 53'

Umpires:
Harsha Gandham (IND)
Mark Rippin (NZL)

6 November 2011
18:05

Australia	3–2	India
Beale 7'; Walters 29'; Joyce 50'	Report	Ramandeep 24', 66'

Umpires:
Nazmi Kamaruddin (MAS)
Shin Dong-yun (KOR)

6 November 2011
20:05

Malaysia	1–1	New Zealand
Ahmad 63'	Report	Russell 9'

Umpires:
Ben de Young (AUS)
Amir Hamzah Khan (PAK)

8 November 2011
16:05

New Zealand	1–6	Australia
Hyde 7'	Report	Ogilvie 6', 13', 23'; Wallace 42', 56'; Walters 65'

Umpires:
Michael Elmer (AUT)
Nazmi Kamaruddin (MAS)

8 November 2011
18:05

Malaysia	4–2	South Korea
Faeez 3'; Syamim 29'; Rosli 40'; Norhizzat 67'	Report	You Seung-ju 28', 44'

Umpires:
Harsha Gandham (IND)
Amir Hamzah Khan (MAS)

8 November 2011
20:05

Pakistan	1–5	India
Bilal 2'	Report	Harpreet 22'; Malayalan 50'; Malak 61'; Rohidas 64'; Ramandeep 69'

Umpires:
Dan Barstow (ENG)
Ben de Young (AUS)

9 November 2011
16:05

South Korea	3–6	Australia
Yoon Dong-hyeon 24'; Hyun Ji-gwang 40'; Seo In-woo 44'	Report	Cowley 42'; Walters 49'; Ogilvie 50'; Wotherspoon 53', 67'; Shaw 55'

Umpires:
Michael Elmer (AUT)
Mark Rippin (NZL)

9 November 2011
18:05

India	2–1	New Zealand
Malak 28', 37'	Report	Russell 7'

Umpires:
Ben de Young (AUS)
Nazmi Kamaruddin (MAS)

9 November 2011
20:05

Pakistan	1–2	Malaysia
Sardar 59'	Report	Faeez 12'; Ahmad 51'

Umpires:
Dan Barstow (ENG)
Shin Dong-yun (KOR)

11 November 2011
16:05

Australia	2–3	Pakistan
Beale 20'; Cowley 33'	Report	Dilber 8'; Bilal 14'; Suleman 34'

Umpires:
Mark Rippin (NZL)
Shin Dong-yun (KOR)

11 November 2011
18:05

New Zealand	1–2	South Korea
Russell 48'	Report	Yoon Dong-hyeon 30', 55'

Umpires:
Amir Hamzah Khan (PAK)
Nazmi Kamaruddin (MAS)

11 November 2011
20:05

India	1–5	Malaysia
Harpreet 13'	Report	Faeez 17', 59'; Izad 45'; Syamim 57'; Irwan 61'

Umpires:
Dan Barstow (ENG)
Ben De Young (AUS)

=== Classification round ===
==== Fifth place game ====
12 November 2011
15:35

New Zealand	0–2	Pakistan
	Report	Dilber 31'; Umair 40'

Umpires:
Harsha Gandham (IND)
Shin Dong-yun (KOR)

==== Third place game ====
12 November 2011
18:05

South Korea	4–3 (a.e.t.)	India
You Seung-ju 7'; Yoon Dong-hyeon 13'; Hyun Jig-wang 37'; Yang Ji-hun 75'	Report	Harpreet 17'; Amit 28'; Satbir 64'

Umpires:
Ben De Young (AUS)
Nazmi Kamaruddin (MAS)

==== Final ====
12 November 2011
20:35

Australia	2–3 (a.e.t.)	Malaysia
Wotherspoon 11'; Wallace 59'	Report	Fitri 43'; Faeez 69', 75'

Umpires:
Dan Barstow (ENG)
Michael Eilmer (AUT)

== Final standings ==
1. Malaysia
2. Australia
3. South Korea
4. India
5. Pakistan
6. New Zealand

== See also ==
- 2011 Sultan Azlan Shah Cup
