= 2012 Sultan of Johor Cup =

Field hockey tournament

Tournament details
- Host country: Malaysia
- City: Johor Bahru
- Dates: 11–18 November
- Teams: 6 (from 3 confederations)
- Venue: Taman Daya Hockey Stadium

Final positions
- Champions: Germany (1st title)
- Runner-up: India
- Third place: Australia

Tournament statistics
- Matches played: 18
- Goals scored: 77 (4.28 per match)
- Top scorer(s): (Malaysia) Noor Faeez Ibrahim (New Zealand) Kane Russell (5 goals)

The 2012 Sultan of Johor Cup was the second edition of the Sultan of Johor Cup, an annual invitational international men's under-21 field hockey tournament in Malaysia. It was held in Johor Bahru, Johor, Malaysia from 11 to 18 November 2012.

Germany defeated India 3–2 through golden goal after being tied 2–2 in the final match to win the cup.

== Participating nations ==
The number of teams for this year's cup was the same compared to the previous tournament where six teams competed.

- Malaysia
- Australia
- Germany
- India
- New Zealand
- Pakistan

== Results ==
All times are in Malaysia Standard Time (UTC+08:00).

=== Preliminary round ===
Pos	Team	Pld	W	D	L	GF	GA	GD	Pts	Qualification
1	India	5	3	2	0	11	5	+6	11	Final
2	Germany	5	3	0	2	13	7	+6	9	Final
3	Australia	5	3	0	2	13	8	+5	9	Third place game
4	Pakistan	5	1	2	2	6	11	−5	5	Third place game
5	Malaysia (H)	5	1	1	3	10	15	−5	4	Fifth place game
6	New Zealand	5	1	1	3	11	18	−7	4	Fifth place game

Source: FIH
(H) Hosts

11 November 2012
16:05 MST

New Zealand	3–3	Pakistan
Panchia 50' van Woerkom 56'; Russell 70'	Report	Dilber 4', 30'; Irfan 16'

Umpires:
Francesco Parisi (ITA)
Anil Kumar (IND)

11 November 2012
18:05 MST

Australia	0–2	India
	Report	Sukhmanjit 49'; Tirkey 70'

Umpires:
Coen van Bunge (NED)
Ilanggo Kanabathu (MAS)

11 November 2012
20:05 MST

Malaysia	3–2	Germany
Amir 38'; Faeez 50'; Ramadan 67'	Report	Grambusch 18'; Trompertz 23'

Umpires:
Levi Stephen (AUS)
Kamran Sharif (PAK)

12 November 2012
16:05 MST

Australia	5–1	Pakistan
Govers 28'; Wotherspoon 39', 67'; Douglas 52'; Gilmour 58'	Report	Dilber 11'

Umpires:
Mark Rippin (NZL)
Ilanggo Kanabathu (MAS)

12 November 2012
18:05 MST

Germany	1–3	India
Schöllkopf 41'	Report	Mandeep 8', 8'; Talwinder 43'

Umpires:
Levi Stephen (AUS)
Francesco Parisi (ITA)

12 November 2012
20:05 MST

Malaysia	2–5	New Zealand
Faeez 22', 24'	Report	Radovonich 17', 32'; Alexander-Parker 30'; Russell 47'; Ritchie 52'

Umpires:
Stefan Leiber (GER)
Coen van Bunge (NED)

14 November 2012
16:05 MST

Germany	5–1	New Zealand
Gomoll 5', 46'; Delarber 8'; Wellen 21'; Hillman 24'	Report	Russell 68'

Umpires:
Kamran Sharif (PAK)
Ilanggo Kanabathu (MAS)

14 November 2012
18:05 MST

Malaysia	2–3	Australia
Firhan 35+'; Amir 36'	Report	Govers 23'; Ogilvie 52'; Posselt 60'

Umpires:
Coen van Bunge (NED)
Anil Kumar (IND)

14 November 2012
20:05 MST

India	0–0	Pakistan
	Report

Umpires:
Francesco Parisi (IND)
Stefan Leiber (GER)

15 November 2012
16:05 MST

Australia	0–2	Germany
	Report	Linnekogel 13'; Adrians 51'

Umpires:
Mark Rippin (NZL)
Francesco Parisi (ITA)

15 November 2012
18:05 MST

New Zealand	1–3	India
van Woerkom 47'	Report	Mandeep 18'; Harjeet 27'; Manpreet 34'

Umpires:
Stefan Leiber (GER)
Kamran Sharif (PAK)

15 November 2012
20:05 MST

Malaysia	0–2	Pakistan
	Report	Dilber 22'; Irfan 39'

Umpires:
Levi Stephen (AUS)
Anil Kumar (IND)

17 November 2012
16:05 MST

Germany	3–0	Pakistan
Gomoll 8'; Adrians 22'; Delarber 49'	Report

Umpires:
Coen van Bunge (NED)
Anil Kumar (IND)

17 November 2012
18:05 MST

India	3–3	Malaysia
Akashdeep 19'; Gagandeep 26'; Gurmail 58'	Report	Faeez 28', 68'; Firhan 45'

Umpires:
Kamran Sharif (PAK)
Mark Rippin (NZL)

17 November 2012
20:05 MST

New Zealand	1–5	Australia
Russell 45'	Report	Govers 33', 52'; Ogilvie 57', 64'; Randhawa 70'

Umpires:
Ilanggo Kanabathu (MAS)
Stefan Leiber (GER)

=== Classification round ===
==== Fifth and sixth place ====
18 November 2012
15:35 MST

Malaysia	1–2 (a.e.t.)	New Zealand
Nazli 48'	Report	Panchia 58'; Russell 72'

Umpires:
Kamran Sharif (PAK)
Anil Kumar (IND)

==== Third and fourth place ====
18 November 2012
18:05 MST

Australia	3–2 (a.e.t.)	Pakistan
Hammond 8'; Wotherspoon 11'; Randhawa 74'	Report	Irfan 49'; R. Ali 66'

Umpires:
Ilanggo Kanabathu (MAS)
Mark Rippin (NZL)

==== Final ====
18 November 2012
20:35 MST

India	2–3	Germany
Satbir 24'; Akashdeep 67'	Report	Gomoll 11'; Delarber 31'; Adrians 49'

Umpires:
Coen van Bunge (NED)
Francesco Parisi (ITA)

== Statistics ==
=== Final standings ===
1. Germany
2. India
3. Australia
4. Pakistan
5. New Zealand
6. Malaysia

=== Goalscorers ===
There were 77 goals scored in 18 matches, for an average of 4.28 goals per match.

5 goals

- (Malaysia) Noor Faeez Ibrahim
- (New Zealand) Kane Russell

4 goals

- (Australia) Blake Govers
- (Germany) Jonas Gomoll
- (Pakistan) Muhammad Dilber

3 goals

- (Australia) Flynn Ogilvie
- (Australia) Dylan Wotherspoon
- (Germany) Florian Adrians
- (Germany) Joshua Delarber
- (India) Mandeep Singh
- (Pakistan) Muhammad Irfan

2 goals

- (Australia) Jayshaan Randhawa
- (India) Akashdeep Singh
- (Malaysia) Ahmad Amir
- (Malaysia) Firhan Ashaari
- (New Zealand) Jared Panchia
- (New Zealand) Ben Radovonich
- (New Zealand) Benedict van Woerkom

1 goal

- (Australia) Justin Douglas
- (Australia) Will Gilmour
- (Australia) Casey Hammond
- (Australia) Kane Posselt
- (Germany) Tom Grambusch
- (Germany) John Hillman
- (Germany) Dieter Linnekogel
- (Germany) Alexander Schöllkopf
- (Germany) Moritz Trompertz
- (Germany) Niklas Wellen
- (India) Gagandeep Singh
- (India) Gurmail Singh
- (India) Harjeet Singh
- (India) Manpreet Singh
- (India) Satbir Singh
- (India) Sukhmanjit Singh
- (India) Talwinder Singh
- (India) Amon Tirkey
- (Malaysia) Irwan Nazli
- (Malaysia) Ramadan Rosli
- (New Zealand) Brennan Alexander-Parker
- (New Zealand) Michael Ritchie
- (Pakistan) Rizwan Ali

Source: FIH
