= Ammad Butt =

Pakistani field hockey player

Personal information
- Full name: Ammad Shakeel Butt
- Born: 13 January 1996 (age 30) Sialkot, Punjab, Pakistan
- Height: 182 cm (6 ft 0 in)
- Weight: 74 kg (163 lb)

Sport
- Sport: Field hockey
- Position: Midfield
National team
Years	Team	Caps	Goals
2012–2016	Pakistan U–21	28	(6)
2013–	Pakistan	178	(15)
Medal record
Men's field hockey
Representing Pakistan
Asian Games
Silver medal – second place	2014 Incheon	Team
Bronze medal – third place	2026 Aichi-Nagoya	Team
Asian Cup
Bronze medal – third place	2017 Dhaka	Team
FIH Champions Trophy
Silver medal – second place	2014 Bhubaneswar	Team
FIH Nations Cup
Silver medal – second place	2024–25 Kuala Lumpur	Team
Asian Champions Trophy
Gold medal – first place	2013 Kakamigahara	Team
Gold medal – first place	2018 Muscat	Team
Silver medal – second place	2016 Kuantan	Team
Bronze medal – third place	2024 Hulunbuir	Team
Sultan Azlan Shah Cup
Silver medal – second place	2024 Ipoh
Junior Asian Cup
Silver medal – second place	2015 Kuantan	Team
Sultan of Johor Cup
Silver medal – second place	2016 Johor Bahru	Team

Ammad Shakeel Butt (born 13 January 1996) at Sialkot is a Pakistani professional field hockey player who plays as a midfielder for the Pakistan team.

Butt was a member of the Pakistan U–21 team from 2012 until 2016. Throughout his time in the junior squad, he served as captain for two years, as well as winning two silver medals, at the 2015 Junior Asian Cup in Kuantan and the 2016 Sultan of Johor Cup in Johor Bahru, respectively.

Throughout the years, he has continued representing the national squad frequently, and has served as captain since 2024.

== Career ==
=== Domestic league ===
Butt currently competes in the Malaysia Hockey League for the Matadors Hockey Club.

=== Under–21 ===
In September 2013, Butt was named in the 18-member squad of the Pakistan junior team for the Sultan of Johor Cup.

He was part of the 18-member squad of the men's hockey team at the 2014 Asian Games that won the silver medal.

In November 2015, Butt was appointed captain of the Pakistan's junior team for the Junior Asia Cup in Malaysia.

In October 2016, the Pakistan Hockey Federation announced Butt as part of the national team for the 4th Asian Champions Trophy in Kuantan and the Pakistan's under-21 team for the Sultan of Johor Cup in Johor Baru.

=== Senior team ===
Following a successful start to his junior career, Butt made his senior international debut at the 2013 Asian Champions Trophy in Kakamigahara, earning his fist cap in a match against Oman. At the tournament, he won his first medal with the national team, taking home gold.

He continued his good form in 2014, earning continued selections in the national team. Throughout the year he won another two medals, taking home silver at the Asian Games in Incheon and the FIH Champions Trophy in Bhubaneswar.

In 2018, he was named vice-captain of the Pakistan team for the Commonwealth Games in Gold Coast, the Hockey Champions Trophy in Breda and the Asian Games in Jakarta and Palembang.

In October 2018, Butt was retained as vice captain of the Pakistan's team for Asian Champions Trophy. Pakistan and India were declared joint winners of the tournament after rain forced the final to be abandoned.

He was named vice-captain of the Pakistan team for the 2018 Men's Hockey World Cup. During the World Cup, following an incident at the 40th minute of the Malaysia-Pakistan game, Ammad Butt was reprimanded for carelessly running into an opponent.

He was announced as part of the 18-member squad for the 2022 Commonwealth Games held in Birmingham.

Following his appointment as captain, he led the team at the 2024 FIH Olympic Qualifiers in Muscat.

He was appointed as the captain of the national hockey team for the 2024 Sultan Azlan Shah Cup in Ipoh, where the team won silver.

In September 2024, Butt as Pakistan's captain led the team to the third place in the Asian Champions Trophy.

In 2025, he led the squad to a silver medal at the 2024–25 FIH Nations Cup in Kuala Lumpur, which eventuated in the teams' promotion to the FIH Pro League.

In 2026, he was named in 20-member squad for the FIH Men’s Hockey World Cup held in Netherlands and Belgium. He was also named in the squad for the 2026 Asian Games in Japan.

Major International Tournaments

The following is a list of major international tournaments Butt has participated in.

- 2013 Asian Champions Trophy – Kakamigahara
- 2014 Asian Games – Incheon
- 2014 FIH Champions Trophy – Bhubaneswar
- 2014–15 FIH World League Semifinal – Antwerp
- 2016 Sultan Azlan Shah Cup – Ipoh
- 2016 Asian Champions Trophy – Kuantan
- 2016–17 FIH World League Semifinal – London
- 2017 Asian Cup – Dhaka
- 2018 Commonwealth Games – Gold Coast
- 2018 Asian Games – Jakarta
- 2018 Asian Champions Trophy – Muscat
- 2018 FIH World Cup – Bhubaneswar
- 2019 FIH Olympic Qualifiers – Amsterdam
- 2021 Asian Champions Trophy – Dhaka
- 2022 Asian Cup – Jakarta
- 2022 Commonwealth Games – Birmingham
- 2024 FIH Olympic Qualifiers – Muscat
- 2024 Sultan Azlan Shah Cup – Ipoh
- 2023–24 FIH Nations Cup – Gniezno
- 2024 Asian Champions Trophy – Hulunbuir
- 2024–25 FIH Nations Cup – Kuala Lumpur
- 2025–26 FIH Pro Leagye – Worldwide
- 2026 Men's FIH Hockey World Cup
- 2026 Asian Games

== Achievements ==
In 2025, Butt was awarded the Tamgha-e-Imtiaz, a state bestowed honour of Pakistan.
