= Justin Douglas (field hockey) =

Australian field hockey player

Personal information
- Born: 1 January 1993 (age 33) Townsville, Queensland

Sport
- Sport: Field hockey
- Position: Forward
Senior career
Years	Team	Caps	Goals
2013–2018	QLD Blades	38	8
2019–	Brisbane Blaze	2	2
National team
Years	Team	Caps	Goals
2012–2013	Australia U–21	25	(16)
Medal record
Men's field hockey
Representing Australia
Sultan of Johor Cup
Bronze medal – third place	2012 Johor Bahru	Team

Justin Douglas (born 1 January 1993) is a field hockey player from Australia.

== Career ==
=== State level ===
Justin Douglas was born and raised in Townsville, Queensland. At a junior level, Douglas represented his home state, Queensland, at all Australian Championships.

In the Australian Hockey League, Douglas represented the Queensland Blades from 2013 to 2018, winning three titles. Following the disbandment of the AHL, Douglas was named in the Brisbane Blaze team for the inaugural tournament of the Sultana Bran Hockey One League, Australia's new premier domestic competition.

=== Junior national team ===
Justin Douglas made his debut for the Australia U–21 side, the 'Burras', at the 2012 Sultan of Johor Cup, winning a bronze medal.

In 2013, Douglas made a series of appearances for the Burras. His first tournament was the Junior Oceania Cup, where Australia won a gold medal and automatic qualification to the Junior World Cup. Following this, he appeared in a tour of Europe, as well a test series against the Malaysia U–21 side. His last appearance for the Australia U–21's came in December at the Junior World Cup, where the team finished fifth.
