= Nicholas Page =

English-born Irish field hockey player

Nick Page
Personal information
- Full name: Nicholas Alexander Page
- Born: 28 May 1997 (age 29) Slough, England

Sport
- Sport: Field hockey
- Position: Midfield
- Club: Oxted
National team
Years	Team	Caps	Goals
2016–2017	England U–21	13	(2)
2017–2017	Great Britain U–21	6	(0)
2022–	Ireland	67	(0)
Medal record
Men's field hockey
Representing Ireland
FIH Nations Cup
Silver medal – second place	2022–23 Potchefstroom
EuroHockey Championship II
Gold medal – first place	2023 Dublin
FIH Olympic Qualifiers
Bronze medal – third place	2024 Valencia
Representing United Kingdom
Sultan of Johor Cup
Silver medal – second place	2017 Johor Bahru

Nicholas Alexander Page (born 28 May 1997) is an English-born field hockey player from Ireland.

== Personal life ==
Nicholas Page was born in Slough, a town in the county of Berkshire in South East England. Following his birth, his family moved to the nation's capital, where he grew up in London.

He is an alumnus of Loughborough University, where he completed a degree in sports science and management.

== Field hockey ==
=== Domestic league ===
Page currently competes in the English Hockey League (EHL), where he plays for Oxted Hockey Club. He also previously represented Old Georgians' in the EHL and the Euro Hockey League, the top club competition hosted by the European Hockey Federation.

=== Under–21 ===
Between 2016 and 2017, Page represented the England and Great Britain national U–21 teams. He appeared in three major tournaments, the 2016 Sultan of Johor Cup and 2017 EuroHockey U–21 Championship for England, and the 2017 Sultan of Johor Cup for Great Britain.

=== Senior national team ===
Page received his first call-up to the Irish squad in 2021. He represented the side in a series of practice matches against Great Britain at Bisham Abbey. He did not earn his first official cap until the following year in 2022, where he represented Ireland in a test series against Spain in Barcelona.

Since his debut, Page has medalled at two major tournaments with the national team. He took home silver at the inaugural edition of the FIH Nations Cup in Potchefstroom in 2022, as well as gold at the 2023 edition of the EuroHockey Championship II in Dublin. He has also appeared in seasons five and six of the FIH Pro League.

In 2024 he helped Ireland qualify for the XXXIII Olympic Games, finishing third at the FIH Olympic Qualifiers in Valencia. Later that year, he officially became an Olympian. He competed in the field hockey competition for Team Ireland at the Olympic Games in Paris.
