= Abu Mahmood =

Pakistani field hockey player

Personal information
- Born: 10 February 1998 (age 28) Faisalabad, Punjab, Pakistan
- Height: 180 cm (5 ft 11 in)
- Weight: 70 kg (154 lb)

Sport
- Sport: Field hockey
- Position: Forward
Senior career
Years	Team	Caps	Goals
2024–	Bayside Cougars	-	-
2026-	Melbourne Cobras	-	-
National team
Years	Team	Caps	Goals
2014–2016	Pakistan U–21	27	(10)
2017–	Pakistan	87	(30)
Medal record
Men's field hockey
Representing Pakistan
Asian Games
Bronze medal – third place	2026 Aichi-Nagoya	Team
Asian Cup
Bronze medal – third place	2017 Dhaka
Asian Champions Trophy
Bronze medal – third place	2024 Hulunbuir	Team
Sultan Azlan Shah Cup
Silver medal – second place	2024 Ipoh
Junior Asia Cup
Silver medal – second place	2015 Kuantan
Sultan of Johor Cup
Silver medal – second place	2016 Johor Bahru

Abu Bakar Mahmood is a Pakistani field hockey player.

== Personal life ==
Abu Mahmood was born on 10 February 1998, in Faisalabad, Pakistan.

== Career ==
=== Under–21 ===
Mahmood made his international debut at under–21 level, where he was a member of the national team at the 2014 Sultan of Johor Cup in Johor Bahru.

In 2015, he appeared at the 2015 edition of the Sultan of Johor Cup. He followed this up with his first medal with the junior national team, taking home silver at the Junior Asian Cup in Kuantan.

Mahmood made his final appearances for the national under–21 side in 2016. He appeared at a Three–Nations Tournament in Hanover, followed by his third and final Sultan of Johor Cup, where he won a silver medal.

=== Senior national team ===
Following a successful junior career, Mahmood made his senior international debut in 2017. He made his first appearances during a test series against New Zealand in Wellington. He continued representing the national team in test matches throughout the year, culminating with a bronze medal at the Asian Cup in Dhaka.

Throughout his career, Mahmood has represented Pakistan at numerous major tournaments:

- 2016–17 FIH World League Semi–Finals – London.
- 2017 Asian Cup – Dhaka.
- 2018 Commonwealth Games – Gold Coast.
- 2018 FIH Champions Trophy – Breda.
- 2018 FIH World Cup – Bhubaneswar.
- 2018 Asian Games – Jakarta.
- 2021 Asian Champions Trophy – Dhaka.
- 2022 Asian Cup – Jakarta.

Following a two-year break from international competition, Mahmood returned to the national team in 2024. He was a member of the squad at the 2024 FIH Olympic Qualifiers in Muscat, where Pakistan narrowly missed Olympic qualification. He won a silver medal at the Sultan Azlan Shah in Ipoh, and represented the national team at the FIH Nations Cup in Gniezno. He also competed at the Asian Champions Trophy in Hulunbuir. He has been selected for the 2025–26 Men's FIH Pro League, the team's first season of the league.
