= 2014 Sultan of Johor Cup =

Field hockey tournament

Tournament details
- Host country: Malaysia
- City: Johor Bahru
- Dates: 12–19 October
- Teams: 6 (from 3 confederations)
- Venue: Taman Daya Hockey Stadium

Final positions
- Champions: India (2nd title)
- Runner-up: Great Britain
- Third place: Australia

Tournament statistics
- Matches played: 18
- Goals scored: 82 (4.56 per match)
- Top scorer: (India) Harmanpreet Singh (9 goals)

The 2014 Sultan of Johor Cup was the fourth edition of the Sultan of Johor Cup. It was held in Johor Bahru, Johor, Malaysia from 12 to 19 October 2014.

The number of teams for the 2014 tournament was the same compared to the previous tournament where six teams competed. Argentina, England and South Korea, who had competed previously, did not participate in this edition and Australia, Great Britain and New Zealand were invited.

India defeated Great Britain 2–1 in the final match to win the cup.

== Participating nations ==
Six countries participated in the 2014 tournament:

- Malaysia (Host)
- Australia
- Great Britain
- India
- New Zealand
- Pakistan

== Umpires ==
1. Satoshi Kondo (JPN)
2. Jonas van 't Hek (NED)
3. Dave Dowdall (GBR)
4. Vasan Marimuthu (MAS)
5. Zeke Newman (AUS)
6. Dhaval Prajapati (IND)
7. Sajid Ali Rana (PAK)
8. Mark Rippin (NZL)

== Results ==
All times are in Malaysia Standard Time (UTC+08:00).

=== Preliminary round ===
Pos	Team	Pld	W	D	L	GF	GA	GD	Pts	Qualification
1	Great Britain	5	5	0	0	18	3	+15	15	Final
2	India	5	4	0	1	18	7	+11	12	Final
3	Australia	5	2	1	2	10	16	−6	7	Third place game
4	New Zealand	5	1	1	3	8	12	−4	4	Third place game
5	Malaysia (H)	5	0	2	3	8	12	−4	2	Fifth place game
6	Pakistan	5	0	2	3	5	17	−12	2	Fifth place game

Source: FIH
(H) Hosts

12 October 2014
16:00

Great Britain	5–0	Pakistan
Taylor 12', 14', 25'; Boon 40'; Goodfield 45'	Report

Umpires:
Mark Rippin (NZL)
Dhaval Prajapati (IND)

12 October 2014
18:00

New Zealand	1–2	India
Woods 53'	Report	Parvinder 5'; Varun 43'

Umpires:
Vasan Marimuthu (MAS)
Zeke Newman (AUS)

12 October 2014
20:00

Malaysia	1–2	Australia
Haziq 4'	Report	Gilmour 9'; Bretherton 18'

Umpires:
Dave Dowdall (GBR)
Satoshi Kondo (JPN)

13 October 2014
16:00

Great Britain	2–0	India
Boon 28'; French 50'	Report

Umpires:
Satoshi Kondo (JPN)
Sajid Ali Rana (PAK)

13 October 2014
18:00

Australia	1–1	Pakistan
Scanlon 60'	Report	Naveed 52'

Umpires:
Jonas van 't Hek (NED)
Mark Rippin (NZL)

13 October 2014
20:00

Malaysia	1–1	New Zealand
Najmi 12'	Report	Radovonich 45'

Umpires:
Dave Dowdall (GBR)
Dhaval Prajapati (IND)

15 October 2014
16:00

Australia	4–3	New Zealand
Scanlon 51'; Bretherton 54'; Crane 57'; Hendry 61'	Report	Woods 3'; Panchia 35+'; Kingstone 41'

Umpires:
Jonas van 't Hek (NED)
Vasan Marimuthu (MAS)

15 October 2014
18:00

India	6–0	Pakistan
Khan 22'; Parvinder 34'; Armaan 49', 69'; Harmanpreet 53'; Varun 67'	Report

Umpires:
Dave Dowdall (GBR)
Zeke Newman (AUS)

15 October 2014
20:00

Malaysia	2–3	Great Britain
Sufi 36'; Shahril 65'	Report	Boon 5'; Goodfield 6'; Taylor 62'

Umpires:
Mark Rippin (NZL)
Sajid Ali Rana (PAK)

16 October 2014
16:00

New Zealand	3–2	Pakistan
Miskimmin 5'; Woods 19'; Jones 43'	Report	Mahmood 55', 66'

Umpires:
Zeke Newman (AUS)
Dhaval Prajapati (IND)

16 October 2014
18:00

Malaysia	2–4	India
Sufi 37'; Azril 42'	Report	Harmanpreet 25', 27', 55'; Varun 65'

Umpires:
Dave Dowdall (GBR)
Satoshi Kondo (JPN)

16 October 2014
20:00

Great Britain	5–1	Australia
Taylor 16', 18', 33'; Imrie 40'; Albery 56'	Report	Rasmussen 22'

Umpires:
Jonas van 't Hek (NED)
Vasan Marimuthu (MAS)

18 October 2014
16:00

Australia	2–6	India
Horner 25', 64'	Report	Harmanpreet 6', 27', 45'; Parvinder 9'; Simranjeet 19'; Pawan 23'

Umpires:
Dave Dowdall (GBR)
Satoshi Kondo (JPN)

18 October 2014
18:00

Pakistan	2–2	Malaysia
Ali 17'; Sabir 56'	Report	Shahril 31', 52'

Umpires:
Jonas van 't Hek (NED)
Dhaval Prajapati (IND)

18 October 2014
20:00

New Zealand	0–3	Great Britain
	Report	Taylor 14'; Brignull 23'; Horler 55'

Umpires:
Zeke Newman (AUS)
Sajid Ali Rana (PAK)

=== Classification round ===
==== Fifth place game ====
19 October 2014
15:30

Malaysia	3–1	Pakistan
Haziq 6'; Najmi 24'; Shahril 32'	Report	Naveed 45'

Umpires:
Satoshi Kondo (JPN)
Mark Rippin (NZL)

==== Third place game ====
19 October 2014
18:00

New Zealand	2–6	Australia
Kingstone 37'; Garrett 52'	Report	S. Benetti 14', 15'; J. Benetti 25'; Craig 28'; Scanlon 64'; Gilmour 69'

Umpires:
Dave Dowdall (GBR)
Vasan Marimuthu (MAS)

==== Final ====
October 2014
20:30

Great Britain	1–2	India
French 56'	Report	Harmanpreet 46', 70+'

Umpires:
Jonas van 't Hek (NED)
Zeke Newman (AUS)

== Final standings ==
1. India
2. Great Britain
3. Australia
4. New Zealand
5. Malaysia
6. Pakistan

== Goalscorers ==
There were 82 goals scored in 18 matches, for an average of 4.56 goals per match.

9 goals

- (India) Harmanpreet Singh

8 goals

- (United Kingdom) Luke Taylor

4 goals

- (Malaysia) Shahril Saabah

3 goals

- (Australia) Andrew Scanlon
- (United Kingdom) Benjamin Boon
- (India) Varun Kumar
- (India) Parvinder Singh
- (New Zealand) Nicholas Woods

2 goals

- (Australia) Simon Benetti
- (Australia) Joshua Bretherton
- (Australia) William Gilmour
- (Australia) Brandan Horner
- (United Kingdom) Samuel French
- (United Kingdom) David Goodfield
- (India) Armman Qureshi
- (Malaysia) Najmi Jazlan
- (Malaysia) Sufi Ismat Rohulamin
- (Malaysia) Haziq Samsul
- (New Zealand) Kim Kingstone
- (Pakistan) Abu Mahmood
- (Pakistan) Muhammad Naveed

1 goal

- (Australia) James Benetti
- (Australia) Benjamin Craig
- (Australia) Oliver Crane
- (Australia) Max Hendry
- (Australia) Alec Rasmussen
- (United Kingdom) James Albery
- (United Kingdom) Liam Brignull
- (United Kingdom) Edward Horler
- (United Kingdom) Hamish Imrie
- (India) Imran Khan
- (India) Pawan Kumar
- (India) Simranjeet Singh
- (Malaysia) Azril Misron
- (New Zealand) Trevor Garrett
- (New Zealand) Craig Jones
- (New Zealand) Harrison Miskimmin
- (New Zealand) Daniel Panchia
- (New Zealand) Benjamin Radovonich
- (Pakistan) Mubashar Ali
- (Pakistan) Mohsin Sabir

Source: FIH

== See also ==
- 2014 Sultan Azlan Shah Cup
