= Kurt Lovett =

Australian field hockey player

Personal information
- Born: 15 January 1997 (age 29) Parkes, New South Wales

Sport
- Sport: Field hockey
- Position: Midfield
Senior career
Years	Team	Caps	Goals
2016–2018	NSW Waratahs	19	3
2019–	NSW Pride	8	8
2024–2026	East Grinstead	-	-
National team
Years	Team	Caps	Goals
2015–2016	Australia U–21	18	(2)
–	Australia	0	(0)
Medal record
Men's field hockey
Representing Australia
Sultan of Johor Cup
Gold medal – first place	2016 Johor Bahru	Team

Kurt Lovett (born 15 January 1997) is a field hockey player from Australia, who plays as a midfielder.

== Personal life ==
Kurt Lovett was born and raised in Parkes, New South Wales.

He is a current scholarship holder with the New South Wales Institute of Sport (NSWIS).

Brother of South Sydney Rabbitohs Ben Lovett

== Career ==
=== Domestic leagues ===
==== Australian Hockey League ====
In 2016, Lovett made his debut for the NSW Waratahs in the Australian Hockey League. His AHL career spanned three seasons, culminating in 2018 with a silver medal.

==== Hockey One ====
Following Hockey Australia's overhaul of the AHL and subsequent introduction of the Sultana Bran Hockey One League in 2019, Kurt Lovett was named in the NSW Pride squad for the inaugural season. The team eventually won the tournament, giving Lovett his first senior national title.

=== National teams ===
==== Under–21 ====
Kurt Lovett made his debut for the Australia Under–21 side in 2015, at the Sultan of Johor Cup.

He followed this up with two appearances in 2016, again at the Sultan of Johor Cup, winning a gold medal, and at the Junior World Cup.

=== Kookaburras ===
In November 2019, Lovett was named in the Kookaburras team for the first time, following two years in the National Development Squad.
