= Tom Sorsby =

English field hockey player (born 1996)

Personal information
- Born: Thomas Callum Sorsby; 28 October 1996 (age 30) Sheffield, England
- Height: 1.81 m (5 ft 11 in)

Sport
- Sport: Field hockey
- Position: Midfielder
- Club: Amsterdam
Senior career
Years	Team	Caps	Goals
2011–2013	Chapeltown HC	-	-
2013–2015	Sheffield Hallam	-	-
2015–2017	Beeston	-	-
2017–2018	University of Nottingham	-	-
2018–2023	Surbiton	-	-
2023–2026	Den Bosch	-	-
2026–present	Amsterdam	-	-
National team
Years	Team	Caps	Goals
2016–2017	England & GB U-21	26	(0)
2019–present	England & GB	147	(10)
Medal record
Men's field hockey
Representing England
EuroHockey Championship
Silver medal – second place	2023 Mönchengladbach
Commonwealth Games
Bronze medal – third place	2022 Birmingham	Team

Thomas Callum Sorsby (born 28 October 1996) is an English field hockey player who plays as a midfielder or defender for Dutch Hoofdklasse club Amsterdam and the England and Great Britain national teams. He competed at the 2020 Summer Olympics and 2024 Summer Olympics.

== Club career ==
Sorsby played hockey for Chapeltown HC before playing for Sheffield Hallam from 2013 to 2015. He joined Beeston for the 2015–16 season. After the 2017–18 season when he played for University of Nottingham Hockey Club he joined Surbiton in the Men's England Hockey League for the 2018–19 season. Sorsby continued to play club hockey in the Premier Division for Surbiton until 2023, when he left England to play for Den Bosch in the Dutch Hoofdklasse. He moved to Amsterdam in 2026.

== International caeer ==
He played for England at the under-18 and under-21 levels and for Great Britain at the under-21 and under-23 levels and represented the England under-21 in the Sultan of Johor Cup in 2016, when they finished 4th and played for the Great Britain under-21 team in the Sultan of Johor Cup in 2017, when they finished 2nd. Sorsby earned a call up to the Great Britain Olympic squad for the delayed 2020 Olympics Games in Tokyo.

He won a bronze medal with England in the Men's tournament at the 2022 Commonwealth Games in Birmingham. He won a silver medal with England at the 2023 Men's EuroHockey Championship in Mönchengladbach. Sorsby was part of the Great Britain that was selected for the 2024 Summer Olympics in Paris, where the team reached the quarter final of the hockey event.
