= 2016 Sultan of Johor Cup =

Field hockey tournament

Tournament details
- Host country: Malaysia
- City: Johor Bahru
- Dates: 31 October–6 November
- Teams: 6
- Venue: Taman Daya Hockey Stadium

Final positions
- Champions: Australia (1st title)
- Runner-up: Pakistan
- Third place: Japan

Tournament statistics
- Matches played: 18
- Goals scored: 89 (4.94 per match)
- Top scorer(s): (Australia) Thomas Craig (Australia) Blake Govers (6 goals)

The 2016 Sultan of Johor Cup was the sixth edition of the Sultan of Johor Cup. It was held in Johor Bahru, Johor, Malaysia from 31 October – 6 November 2016.

As in previous editions, a total of six teams competed for the title. Defending champions Great Britain, as well as Argentina and India who also competed previously, were absent from the tournament. The teams were replaced by England, Japan and New Zealand.

Australia won the tournament for the first time by defeating Pakistan 3–1 in the final. Japan won the bronze medal by defeating England 4–1 in a penalty shoot-out following a 2–2 draw.

== Participating nations ==
Including the host nation, 6 teams competed in the tournament. Defending champions, Great Britain, were absent from the tournament.

Australia

Head Coach: (Australia) Benjamin Bishop

1. Kiran Arunasalam
2. Timothy Howard (C)
3. Blake Govers
4. Matthew Bird
5. Matthew Finn (GK)
6. Max Hendry
7. Stephen Gales
8. Ryan Proctor
9. Kurt Lovett
10. Frazer Gerrard
12. Joshua Simmonds
13. Jack Welch
15. Andrew Scanlon
18. Corey Weyer
19. Blake Wotherspoon
21. Timothy Brand
22. Samuel Liles (C)
23. Thomas Craig
26. Jonathan Bretherton
31. Ashleigh Thomas (GK)
England

Head Coach: (England) Jonathan Bleby

1. Toby Reynolds-Cotterill (GK)
2. Christopher Wyver (GK)
3. Robert Gleeson
4. Thomas Sorsby
5. Nicholas Page
6. Edward Way
7. Peter Scott
8. William Calnan
9. Euan Gilmour
10. James Gall (C)
11. James Oates
12. Jack Waller
13. Duncan Scott
14. Benjamin Stevenson
15. Josh Pavis
17. Jack Turner
18. Jack Simpson
19. Jack Clee
20. Rhys Smith
21. Christopher Proctor
Japan

Head Coach: (Japan) Kyoichi Nagaya

1. Hiroki Nakagami (GK)
2. Keita Matsuda (GK)
3. Koyo Kameyama
4. Miyu Tanimitsu
5. Tatsunori Kondo
7. Takehiro Chiba
8. Takumi Ineyama
9. Fumiya Yamazaki
10. Ryo Arai
11. Shinichi Kamezaki
12. Kaito Tanaka
13. Mizuki Ikeda
14. Kota Ozawa
15. Soma Hayashi
16. Ryo Ozawa (C)
17. Koji Yamasaki
19. Koki Kataoka
20. Kyohei Ogawa
21. Keisuke Kawamura
Malaysia

Head Coach: (Malaysia) Wallace Tan

1. Syed Cholan
2. Arif Ishak
3. Ashran Hamsani
5. Firdaus Omar
6. Zulhamizan Mohamad
7. Najib Hassan
8. Khaliq Hamirin
9. Luqman Ahmad Shukran
10. Akhimullah Anuar
11. Muhammad Zaidi
12. Muhammad Fauzi
13. Norsyafiq Sumantri
14. Amirol Arshad (C)
15. Mohamad Baharom
16. Ridzwan Azmi (GK)
17. Rafizul Mustafa
18. Zul Pidaus Mizun
24. Aiman Rozemi
25. Najmi Jazlan
26. Zaimi Mat Deris (GK)
New Zealand

Head Coach: (New Zealand) Bryce Collins

1. Thomas Mallon (GK)
4. Mitchell Ottow
5. David Brydon
6. Jonathan Keaney
9. Hugh Hendrickson
10. Kieran O'Connor
11. Samuel Lane
12. Robert Capizzi
13. Oliver Logan
14. Bradley Read (C)
16. Aidan Sarikaya
17. Dylan Thomas
18. Jonathan Thorn
19. Mackenzie Wilcox
20. Dominic Dixon (GK)
21. Reuben Andrews
22. Joshua Meates
24. Dylan Stevenson
25. Samuel Hiha
26. Joshua Smith
Pakistan

Head Coach: (Pakistan) Zaman Tahir

1. Ali Raza (GK)
2. Muhammad Mushtaq
3. Mubashar Ali
4. Abu Mahmood
5. Ammad Butt
6. Muhammad Kamal
7. Shan Irshad
8. Muhammad Yaqoob
9. Muhammad Dilber (C)
10. Muhammad Atiq
11. Muhammad Bilal Qadir
12. Muneeb Un-Rehman
13. Hassan Anwar
14. Faizan
15. Tazeem Ul Hassan (GK)
16. Mohsin Sabir
17. Suhail Riaz
18. Ullah Sami
19. Muhammad Rizwan
20. Muhammad Hamdi

== Umpires ==
A total of eight umpires were appointed by the FIH to officiate the tournament.

- Andres Ortiz (ESP)
- Michiel Otten (NED)
- Nick Bennett (ENG)
- Lee Erskine (NZL)
- Yasir Khurshid (PAK)
- Hideyuki Takahashi (JPN)
- James Unkles (AUS)
- Rais Zakaria (MAS)

== Results ==
All times are local; Malaysia Standard Time (UTC+08:00).

=== Preliminary round ===
Pos	Team	Pld	W	D	L	GF	GA	GD	Pts	Qualification
1	Australia	5	3	2	0	27	6	+21	11	Advanced to Final
2	Pakistan	5	3	1	1	14	14	0	10	Advanced to Final
3	Japan	5	3	0	2	9	11	−2	9	Advanced to Third Place Match
4	England	5	2	2	1	12	9	+3	8	Advanced to Third Place Match
5	Malaysia	5	1	1	3	7	12	−5	4	
6	New Zealand	5	0	0	5	7	24	−17	0	

Source: FIH
Rules for classification: 1) points; 2) matches won; 3) goal difference; 4) goals for; 5) head-to-head result; 6) field goals scored.

==== Fixtures ====
31 October 2016
16:00

Australia	6–0	Japan
Scanlon 6'; Arunasalam 19'; Simmonds 23'; Hendry 61', 70'; Craig 63'	Report

Umpires:
Andrés Ortíz (ESP)
Rais Zakaria (MAS)

31 October 2016
18:00

New Zealand	2–5	Pakistan
Lane 46'; Wilcox 59'	Report	Qadir 22'; Mubasshir 33'; Riaz 48', 65'; Dilber 70'

Umpires:
Nicholas Bennett (ENG)
Michiel Otten (NED)

31 October 2016
20:30

England	3–1	Malaysia
Page 18'; Calnan 24'; C. Proctor 60'	Report	Akhimullah 23'

Umpires:
Lee Erskine (NZL)
James Unkles (AUS)

1 November 2016
16:00

Japan	4–1	New Zealand
Yamasaki 19', 25'; Ogawa 29'; Tanaka 69'	Report	Logan 64'

Umpires:
Yasir Khurshid (PAK)
James Unkles (AUS)

1 November 2016
18:00

England	2–2	Pakistan
Calnan 12', 39'	Report	Ullah 63'; Mahmood 69'

Umpires:
Michiel Otten (NED)
Hideyuki Takahashi (JPN)

1 November 2016
20:30

Malaysia	2–2	Australia
Najmi 39'; Zulhamizan 59'	Report	Craig 58'; Arunasalam 66'

Umpires:
Nicholas Bennett (ENG)
Andrés Ortíz (ESP)

2 November 2016
16:00

Japan	2–1	England
Yamasaki 44', 68'	Report	Gall 65'

Umpires:
Rais Zakaria (MAS)
Yasir Khurshid (PAK)

2 November 2016
18:00

New Zealand	1–9	Australia
Lane 9'	Report	Hendry 20', 63'; Govers 34', 55'; R. Proctor 34'; Scanlon 41'; Arunasalam 53'; Bird 57'; Gerrard 66'

Umpires:
Hideyuki Takahashi (JPN))
Nicholas Bennett (ENG)

2 November 2016
20:30

Pakistan	4–1	Malaysia
Mahmood 7'; Dilber 20'; Irshad 30'; Ullah 46'	Report	Najmi 25'

Umpires:
Lee Erskine (NZL)
Andrés Ortíz (ESP)

4 November 2016
16:00

England	4–2	New Zealand
Clee 11'; Scott 28'; Sorsby 40'; C. Proctor 59'	Report	Sarikaya 51'; Thomas 57'

Umpires:
James Unkles (AUS)
Rais Zakaria (MAS)

4 November 2016
18:00

Australia	8–1	Pakistan
Craig 5', 17', 34'; Govers 21'; Gerrard 47'; Hendry 50'; R. Proctor 64', 68'	Report	25' Atiq

Umpires:
Hideyuki Takahashi (JPN)
Lee Erskine (NZL)

4 November 2016
20:30

Malaysia	1–2	Japan
Rozaini 16'	Report	Tanimitsu 27', 63'

Umpires:
Michiel Otten (NED)
Yasir Khurshid (PAK)

5 November 2016
16:00

Australia	2–2	England
Govers 9'; Craig 66'	Report	Scott 32'; Clee 70'

Umpires:
Hideyuki Takahashi (JPN)
Michiel Otten (NED)

5 November 2016
18:00

Pakistan	2–1	Japan
Mahmood 4', 11'	Report	Ogawa 21'

Umpires:
Andrés Ortíz (ESP)
Nicholas Bennett (ENG)

5 November 2016
20:30

New Zealand	1–2	Malaysia
Read 9'	Report	Muhammad 38'; Najmi 48'

Umpires:
James Unkles (AUS)
Yasir Khurshid (PAK)

=== Classification round ===
==== Fifth and sixth place ====
6 November 2016
16:00

Malaysia	4–1	New Zealand
Najmi 6'; Zulhamizan 10'; Firdaus 51'; Ashran 69'	Report	Wilcox 32'

Umpires:
Hideyuki Takahashi (JPN)
James Unkles (AUS)

==== Third and fourth place ====
6 November 2016
18:15

Japan	2–2	England
Tanimitsu 31'; Tanaka 55'	Report	Clee 20'; Waller 34'
Penalties
Yamasaki (penalty shoot-out scored); Tanaka (penalty shoot-out scored); Kamezaki (penalty shoot-out scored); Ozawa (penalty shoot-out scored)	4–1	(penalty shoot-out scored) Scott; (penalty shoot-out missed) Clee; (penalty shoot-out missed) Smith

Umpires:
Rais Zakaria (MAS)
Lee Erskine (NZL)

==== Final ====
6 November 2016
20:40

Australia	3–1	Pakistan
Gerrard 13'; Govers 47', 67'	Report	Anwar 7'

Umpires:
Nicholas Bennett (ENG)
Andrés Ortíz (ESP)

== Statistics ==
=== Final standings ===
Pos	Team	Pld	W	D	L	GF	GA	GD	Pts	Qualification
1st place, gold medalist(s)	Australia	6	4	2	0	30	7	+23	14	Gold Medal
2nd place, silver medalist(s)	Pakistan	6	3	1	2	15	17	−2	10	Silver Medal
3rd place, bronze medalist(s)	Japan	6	3	1	2	11	13	−2	10	Bronze Medal
4	England	6	2	3	1	14	11	+3	9	
5	Malaysia	6	2	1	3	11	13	−2	7	
6	New Zealand	6	0	0	6	8	28	−20	0	

Source: FIH

=== Goalscorers ===
There were 89 goals scored in 18 matches, for an average of 4.94 goals per match.

6 goals

- (Australia) Thomas Craig
- (Australia) Blake Govers

5 goals

- (Australia) Max Hendry

4 goals

- (Japan) Koji Yamasaki
- (Malaysia) Najmi Jazlan
- (Pakistan) Abu Mahmood

3 goals

- (Australia) Kiran Arunasalam
- (Australia) Frazer Gerrard
- (Australia) Ryan Proctor
- (England) William Calnan
- (England) Jack Clee
- (Japan) Miyu Tanimitsu

2 goals

- (Australia) Andrew Scanlon
- (England) Christoper Proctor
- (England) Peter Scott
- (Japan) Kyohei Ogawa
- (Japan) Kaito Tanaka
- (Malaysia) Mohamed Zulhamizan
- (New Zealand) Samuel Lane
- (New Zealand) Mackenzie Wilcox
- (Pakistan) Muhammad Dilber
- (Pakistan) Sami Ullah
- (Pakistan) Rana Riaz

1 goal

- (Australia) Matthew Bird
- (Australia) Joshua Simmonds
- (England) James Gall
- (England) Nicholas Page
- (England) Thomas Sorsby
- (England) Jack Waller
- (Malaysia) Akhimullah Anuar
- (Malaysia) Nik Muhammad Aiman
- (Malaysia) Firdaus Fauzi
- (Malaysia) Ashran Hamsani
- (Malaysia) Rozaini Baharom
- (New Zealand) Oliver Logan
- (New Zealand) Bradley Read
- (New Zealand) Aidan Sarikaya
- (New Zealand) Dylan Thomas
- (Pakistan) Hassan Anwar
- (Pakistan) Muhammad Atiq
- (Pakistan) Shan Irshad
- (Pakistan) Ali Mubasshir
- (Pakistan) Muhammad Bilal Qadir

Source: FIH
