= Hugo Genestet =

French field hockey player

Personal information
- Full name: Hugo Valentin Paul Genestet
- Born: 2 March 1992 (age 34)
- Height: 170 cm (5 ft 7 in)
- Weight: 70 kg (154 lb)

Sport
- Sport: Field hockey
- Position: Midfielder
- Club: Waterloo Ducks
Senior career
| Years | Team | Caps | Goals |
| –2014 | Saint Germain | - | - |
| 2014–2016 | Leuven | - | - |
| 2016–2018 | Saint Germain | - | - |
| 2018–2019 | Daring | - | - |
| 2019–present | Waterloo Ducks | - | - |
National team
| Years | Team | Caps | Goals |
| 2010–2013 | France U21 | 16 | (8) |
| 2010–present | France | 167 | (29) |
Medal record
Men's field hockey
Representing France
Junior World Cup
| Silver medal – second place | 2013 New Delhi |

Hugo Valentin Paul Genestet (born 2 March 1992) is a French field hockey player who plays as a midfielder for Belgian club Waterloo Ducks and the French national team.

== Club career ==
Genestet played for Saint Germain in France before he joined Leuven in Belgium in 2014. He played there until 2016 when he returned to France. In 2018 he joined Daring in the Belgian Hockey League. After one season he left Daring for the Waterloo Ducks.

== International career ==
=== Under–21 ===
Genestet was a member of the French U–21 side from 2010 through to 2013. In 2013, he was a member of the team at the FIH Junior World Cup in New Delhi. At the tournament, the team made history by securing France's first medal at the event, taking home silver.

=== Senior national team ===
Genestet also debuted for the France national team in 2010, and has been a member of the team since. He represented France at the 2018 World Cup. He is the current captain of the national team.
