= Taman Daya =

Suburb in Johor Bahru, Johor, Malaysia

Coordinates: 1°33′04.9″N 103°45′34.1″E

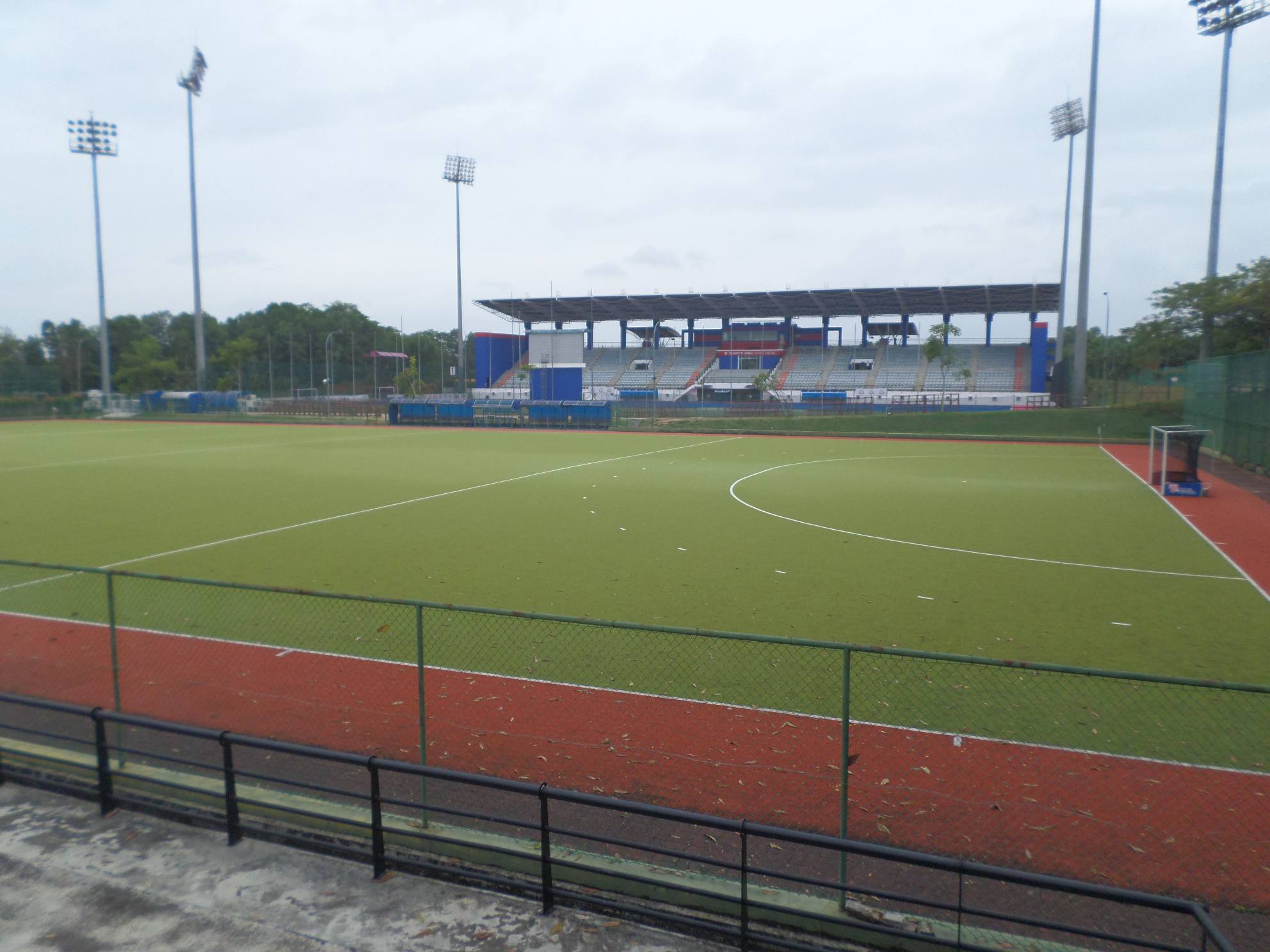
Taman Daya Hockey Stadium

Taman Daya is a suburb in Johor Bahru, Johor, Malaysia. It is the site of the Taman Daya Hockey Stadium.
