= 2021 Men's Hockey Junior Asia Cup =

Cancelled field hockey tournament

Tournament details
- Host country: Bangladesh
- City: Dhaka
- Dates: Cancelled
- Teams: 10 (from 1 confederation)
- Venue(s): Maulana Bhasani Hockey Stadium

The 2021 Men's Hockey Junior Asia Cup was scheduled to be the 9th edition of the Men's Hockey Junior Asia Cup, the men's international under-21 field hockey championship of Asia organized by the Asian Hockey Federation. It was originally scheduled to take place from 4 to 12 June 2020 in Dhaka, Bangladesh.

The tournament served as the Asian qualifier for the 2021 FIH Junior World Cup, with the top four qualifying.

Due to the COVID-19 pandemic the tournament was postponed on 26 March 2020 to a yet to be determined date. In September 2020 it was announced that the tournament would take place from 21 to 30 January 2021. The tournament was postponed for the second time in November 2020 to July 2021. On 13 August 2021 the tournament as officially cancelled after it was again rescheduled.

== Qualification ==
The top six teams from the 2015 edition qualified directly and they were joined by the top four from the 2019 Junior AHF Cup.

=== Qualified teams ===
The following teams have qualified for the tournament.

Dates	Event	Location	Quotas	Qualifiers
14–22 November 2015	2015 Junior Asia Cup	Kuantan, Malaysia	6	Bangladesh; India; Japan; Malaysia; Pakistan; South Korea
5–14 December 2019	2019 Junior AHF Cup	Muscat, Oman	4	China; Chinese Taipei; Oman; Uzbekistan
Total			10	

== See also ==
- 2021 Women's Hockey Junior Asia Cup
