= 2017 Sultan of Johor Cup =

Field hockey tournament

Tournament details
- Host country: Malaysia
- City: Johor Bahru
- Dates: 22–29 October 2017
- Teams: 6
- Venue: Taman Daya Hockey Stadium

Final positions
- Champions: Australia (2nd title)
- Runner-up: Great Britain
- Third place: India

Tournament statistics
- Matches played: 18
- Goals scored: 140 (7.78 per match)
- Top scorer(s): (Australia) Nathan Ephraums (India) Dilpreet Singh (9 goals)
- Best player: (India) Vivek Prasad

The 2017 Sultan of Johor Cup was the seventh edition of the Sultan of Johor Cup, a field hockey tournament. It was held in Johor Bahru, Johor, Malaysia from 22 to 29 October 2017.

As in previous editions, a total of six teams competed for the title. England, New Zealand as well as Pakistan who competed previously, were absent from the tournament. The teams were replaced by Great Britain, India and United States.

== Participating nations ==
Including the host nation, 6 teams competed in the tournament.

- Australia
- Great Britain
- India
- Japan
- Malaysia (host nation)
- United States

== Umpires ==
A total of seven umpires were appointed by the FIH and National Association to officiate the tournament.

- Tim Bond (NZL)
- Anand Dangi (IND)
- Ian Diamond (GBR)
- Ben Hocking (AUS)
- Faqarudin Kadir (MAS)
- Kinoshita Hideki (JPN)
- Benjamin Peters (USA)

== Results ==
The schedule was released on 7 September 2017. All times are in Malaysia Standard Time (UTC+08:00).

=== Pool matches ===
Pos	Team	Pld	W	D	L	GF	GA	GD	Pts	Qualification
1	Great Britain	5	5	0	0	21	4	+17	15	Advance to Final
2	Australia	5	4	0	1	32	8	+24	12	Advance to Final
3	India	5	3	0	2	31	9	+22	9	Third-place match
4	Malaysia (H)	5	1	1	3	21	7	+14	4	Third-place match
5	Japan	5	1	1	3	18	11	+7	4	Fifth-place match
6	United States	5	0	0	5	0	84	−84	0	Fifth-place match

Updated to match(es) played on 28 October 2017. Source: FIH
Rules for classification: 1) points; 2) goal difference; 3) goals scored; 4) head-to-head result.
(H) Hosts

22 October 2017
16:05

India	3–2	Japan
Dilpreet 11', 53'; Sukhjeet 41'	Report	Ogawa 23', 31'

Umpires:
Benjamin Peters (USA)
Faqarudin Kadir (MAS)

22 October 2017
18:05

Australia	19–0	United States
Scanlon 6', 22'; Steffens 10', 53'; Ephraums 10', 12', 42', 46', 49'; Rintala 15', 33', 34'; Green 21'; Farmilo 44', 48', 55', 57'; Flynn 50'; Anderson 57'	Report

Umpires:
Hideki Kinoshita (JPN)
Ian Diamond (GBR)

22 October 2017
20:35

Great Britain	1–0	Malaysia
Scott 49'	Report

Umpires:
Ben Hocking (AUS)
Anand (IND)

23 October 2017
16:05

Australia	4–0	Japan
Ephraums 33'; Stewart 36'; Flynn 39'; Scanlon 44'	Report

Umpires:
Anand (IND)
Ian Diamond (GBR)

23 October 2017
18:05

United States	0–11	Great Britain
	Report	Golden 6', 44'; Scott 15', 40', 41'; Francis 45', 46'; Mackenize 47'; Sutcliffe 54'; Way 56'; Blumfield 59'

Umpires:
Faqarudin Kadir (MAS)
Hideki Kinoshita (JPN)

23 October 2017
20:35

India	2–1	Malaysia
Dilpreet 20', 43'	Report	Firdaus 3'

Umpires:
Tim Bond (NZL)
Benjamin Peters (USA)

25 October 2017
16:05

Great Britain	4–2	Australia
Park 25'; Mackenzie 41'; Way 43'; Scott 57'	Report	Busiko 26'; Ephraums 28'

Umpires:
Tim Bond (NZL)
Hideki Kinoshita (JPN)

25 October 2017
18:05

United States	0–22	India
	Report	Pratap 2'; Vishal 2', 30', 44'; Dilpreet 3', 54', 59'; Rabichandra 7'; Harmanjit 25', 26', 40', 45', 52'; Abhishek 28', 37', 38', 45'; Raushan 37'; Maninder 42', 43'; Shilanand 47'; Vivek 48'

Umpires:
Faqarudin Kadir (MAS)
Ian Diamond (GBR)

25 October 2017
20:35

Malaysia	1–1	Japan
Akhimullah 17'	Report	Ineyama 32'

Umpires:
Ben Hocking (AUS)
Anand (IND)

26 October 2017
16:05

India	3–4	Australia
Sanjay 9'; Dilpreet 30', 47'	Report	Rintala 3'; Green 36'; Bretherton 45'; Ephraums 49'

Umpires:
Tim Bond (NZL)
Ian Diamond (GBR)

26 October 2017
18:05

Malaysia	18–0	United States
Aiman 4', 5', 21', 22', 59'; Akhimullah 6', 23', 41', 56'; Zaidi 17'; Firdaus 18', 32', 54'; Abu 33', 50', 55'; Luqman 40'; Hassan 58'	Report

Umpires:
Anand (IND)
Hideki Kinoshita (JPN)

26 October 2017
20:35

Japan	1–3	Great Britain
Watanabe 30'	Report	Way 45'; Mackenzie 54'; Wallace 59'

Umpires:
Ben Hocking (AUS)
Benjamin Peters (USA)

28 October 2017
16:05

Great Britain	2–1	India
Sorsby 20'; Waller 52'	Report	Raushan 25'

Umpires:
Tim Bond (NZL)
Ben Hocking (AUS)

28 October 2017
18:05

Australia	3–1	Malaysia
Stewart 15+'; Anderson 33'; Scanlon 57'	Report	Abu 51'

Umpires:
Ian Diamond (GBR)
Benjamin Peters (USA)

28 October 2017
20:35

Japan	14–0	United States
Ogawa 1', 22', 22'; Tamekuni 8'; Ikeda 17'; Sugiyama 21'; Fujishima 26'; Sugino 28'; Ozawa 29', 41'; Kamezaki 36', 42'; Kato 55'; Morishita 59'	Report

Umpires:
Anand (IND)
Faqarudin Kadir (MAS)

=== Classification matches ===
==== Fifth and sixth place ====
29 October 2017
15:35

Japan	11–0	United States
Kato 2', 7', 25', 55'; Morishita 10'; Kamezaki 13'; Sugiyama 14', 44', 45'; Watanabe 37'; Chiba 42'	Report

Umpires:
Anand (IND)
Faqarudin Kadir (MAS)

==== Third and fourth place ====
29 October 2017
18:05

India	4–0	Malaysia
Vivek 11'; Vishal 15', 25'; Shilanand 21'	Report

Umpires:
Ian Diamond (GBR)
Ben Hocking (AUS)

==== Final ====
29 October 2017
20:35 MST

Great Britain	0–2	Australia
	Report	Rintala 4'; Ephraums 35'

Umpires:
Tim Bond (NZL)
Hideki Kinoshita (JPN)

== Awards ==
Five awards were awarded at the conclusion of the tournament.

Player of the Tournament	Top Goalscorer(s)	Goalkeeper of the Tournament
(India) Vivek Prasad	(Australia) Nathan Ephraums (India) Dilpreet Singh	(United Kingdom) Chris Wyver
Player of the Final	(Australia) Nathan Ephraums (India) Dilpreet Singh	Play the Whistle (Fair Play)
(Australia) Nathanael Stewart	(Australia) Nathan Ephraums (India) Dilpreet Singh	United States

== Final standings ==
Pos	Team	Pld	W	D	L	GF	GA	GD	Pts	Final result
1st place, gold medalist(s)	Australia	6	5	0	1	34	8	+26	15	Gold medal
2nd place, silver medalist(s)	Great Britain	6	5	0	1	21	6	+15	15	Silver medal
3rd place, bronze medalist(s)	India	6	4	0	2	35	9	+26	12	Bronze medal
4	Malaysia (H)	6	1	1	4	21	11	+10	4	
5	Japan	6	2	1	3	29	11	+18	7	
6	United States	6	0	0	6	0	95	−95	0	

Source: FIH
(H) Hosts

== Goalscorers ==
There were 140 goals scored in 18 matches, for an average of 7.78 goals per match.

9 goals

- (Australia) Nathan Ephraums
- (India) Dilpreet Singh

5 goals

- (Australia) Joel Rintala
- (United Kingdom) Duncan Scott
- (India) Vishal Antil
- (India) Harmanjit Singh
- (Japan) Ryosei Kato
- (Japan) Kyohei Ogawa
- (Malaysia) Akhimullah Anuar
- (Malaysia) Aiman Rozemi

4 goals

- (Australia) Isaac Farmilo
- (Australia) Andrew Scanlon
- (India) Abhishek Nain
- (Japan) Atushi Sugiyama
- (Malaysia) Abu Kamal Azrai
- (Malaysia) Firdaus Omar

3 goals

- (United Kingdom) Callum Mackenzie
- (United Kingdom) Edward Way
- (Japan) Shinichi Kamezaki

2 goals

- (Australia) Jacob Anderson
- (Australia) Liam Flynn
- (Australia) Coby Green
- (Australia) Damon Steffens
- (Australia) Nathanael Stewart
- (United Kingdom) Benjamin Francis
- (United Kingdom) Cameron Golden
- (India) Raushan Kumar
- (India) Shilanand Lakra
- (India) Vivek Prasad
- (India) Maninder Singh
- (Japan) Yuta Morishita
- (Japan) Kota Ozawa
- (Japan) Ramu Watanabe

1 goal

- (Australia) Joshua Bretherton
- (Australia) Lachlan Busiko
- (United Kingdom) Alexander Blumfield
- (United Kingdom) Nicholas Park
- (United Kingdom) Thomas Sorsby
- (United Kingdom) James Sutcliffe
- (United Kingdom) Zachary Wallace
- (United Kingdom) Jack Waller
- (India) Pratap Lakra
- (India) Rabichandra Singh Moirangthem
- (India) Sanjay Rana
- (India) Sukhjeet Singh
- (Japan) Takehiro Chiba
- (Japan) Raiki Fujishima
- (Japan) Mizuki Ikeda
- (Japan) Takumi Ineyawa
- (Japan) Kyohei Sugino
- (Japan) Ryuji Tamekuni
- (Malaysia) Muhammad Hassan
- (Malaysia) Luqman Ahmad Shukran
- (Malaysia) Muhammad Zaidi

Source: FIH
