= Malaysia men's national under-21 field hockey team =

Malaysia
- Association: Malaysian Hockey Confederation (Konfederasi Hoki Malaysia)
- Head Coach: (Malaysia) Wallace Tan
- Assistant coach(es): (Malaysia) Nasihin Nubli
Home	Away

Junior World Cup
- Appearances: 13 (first in 1979)
- Best result: 4th (1979, 1982, 2013)

Junior Asia Cup
- Appearances: 11 (first in 1988)
- Best result: (gold) 1st (2012)
Medal record
Junior Asia Cup
Gold medal – first place	2012 Malacca
Silver medal – second place	1992 Kuala Lumpur
Bronze medal – third place	2000 Kuala Lumpur

The Malaysia men's national under-21 field hockey team represents Malaysia in international under-21 field hockey competitions. It is governed by the Malaysian Hockey Confederation, the governing body for field hockey in Malaysia. They won their first ever Junior Asia Cup title in 2012, beating Pakistan in the final. Malaysia won the Sultan of Johor Cup in 2011 and 2026.

== Tournament record ==
=== Junior World Cup ===
Junior World Cup
Year	Round	Position	GP	W	D	L	GS	GA
(France) 1979	4th	4/12	7	4	0	3	11	9
(Malaysia) 1982	4th	4/11	6	2	1	3	16	24
(Canada) 1985	10th	10/14	7	2	0	5	10	19
(Malaysia) 1989	6th	6/12	7	3	0	4	9	18
(Spain) 1993	11th	11/12	6	1	0	5	8	16
(England) 1997	Did not qualify							
(Australia) 2001	12th	12/16	8	1	3	4	13	19
(Netherlands) 2005	10th	10/16	8	3	1	4	21	20
(Malaysia) 2009	12th	12/20	8	3	2	3	17	15
(India) 2013	4th	4/16	6	4	1	1	14	14
(India) 2016	11th	11/16	5	1	1	3	7	15
(India) 2021	8th	8/16	6	2	1	3	11	22
(Malaysia) 2023	12th	12/16	6	2	0	4	17	15
(India) 2025	13th	13/24	6	2	1	3	15	17
2027	Qualified							
Total	Best results: 4th	12/13	86	30	11	45	169	223

=== Junior Asia Cup ===
Junior Asia Cup record
Year	Host	Position
1988	Karachi, Pakistan	4th
1992	Kuala Lumpur, Malaysia	2nd
1996	Singapore	5th
2000	Kuala Lumpur, Malaysia	3rd
2004	Karachi, Pakistan	4th
2008	Hyderabad, India	5th
2012	Malacca, Malaysia	1st
2015	Kuantan, Malaysia	5th
2021	Dhaka, Bangladesh	cancelled
2023	Salalah, Oman	4th
2024	Muscat, Oman	4th
2026	Moqi, China	4th
Best result		1st

=== Sultan of Johor Cup ===
- 2011 – (gold)
- 2012 – 6th place
- 2013 – (silver)
- 2014 – 5th place
- 2015 – (bronze)
- 2016 – 5th place
- 2017 – 4th place
- 2018 – 5th place
- 2019 – (bronze)
- 2022 – 6th place
- 2023 – 7th place
- 2024 – 6th place
- 2025 – 5th place
- 2026 – (gold)

== See also ==
- Malaysia men's national field hockey team
- Malaysia women's national under-21 field hockey team
