= Théophile Ponthieu =

French field hockey player

Personal information
- Born: 19 April 1994 (age 32) Lille, France

Sport
- Sport: Field hockey
- Position: Midfield
Senior career
Years	Team	Caps	Goals
2024–	Canberra Chill	-	-
National team
Years	Team	Caps	Goals
2013–2014	France U–21	11	(2)
2016–	France	29	(2)
Medal record
Men's field hockey
Representing France
FIH Hockey Series
Gold medal – first place	2018–19 Le Touquet	Team
EuroHockey Championship II
Gold medal – first place	2019 Cambrai	Team
FIH Junior World Cup
Silver medal – second place	2013 New Delhi	Team

Théophile Ponthieu is a field hockey player from France.

== Personal life ==
Théophile Ponthieu was born on 19 April 1994, in Lille, France. His younger sister, Emma, also plays international field hockey.

== Career ==
=== Domestic league ===
Ponthieu previously played for Lille MHC in the French National League.

In 2024, he moved to Australia for the fourth season of the Liberty Hockey One League. He was a member of the Canberra Chill squad.

=== Under–21 ===
Ponthieu made his international debut at under–21 level. He was a member of the silver medal-winning French U–21 team at the 2013 FIH Junior World Cup in New Delhi.

The following year he competed at the EuroHockey U–21 Championship in Waterloo.

=== Les Bleus ===
Ponthieu made his senior international debut in April 2016, during a test series against Wales in Cardiff.

Throughout his senior career, Ponthieu has represented Les Blues on multiple occasions. He has won two gold medals with the team, at the 2018–19 FIH Series Finals in Le Touquet, and the 2019 EuroHockey Championship II in Cambrai.

==== International goals ====
Goal	Date	Location	Opponent	Score	Result	Competition	Ref.
1	31 July 2019	Cambrai Hockey Club, Cambrai, France	Belarus	1–0	3–1	2019 EuroHockey Championship II	
2	3 August 2019	Cambrai Hockey Club, Cambrai, France	Russia	3–0	4–0	2019 EuroHockey Championship II	
