= Pakistan men's national under-21 field hockey team =

National sports team

Pakistan
- Association: Pakistan Hockey Federation
- Confederation: AHF (Asia)
- Head Coach: Sameer Hussain
- Assistant coach(es): Azfar Yaqoob
- Manager: Ayaz Mahmood
- Captain: Muhammad Ammad

Junior World Cup
- Appearances: 11 (first in 1979)
- Best result: (gold) 1st (1979)

Junior Asia Cup
- Appearances: 11 (first in 1988)
- Best result: (gold) 1st (1988, 1992, 1996)
Medal record
Junior World Cup
| Gold medal – first place | 1979 Versailles |
| Silver medal – second place | 1993 Terrassa |
| Bronze medal – third place | 1982 Kuala Lumpur |
| Bronze medal – third place | 1985 Vancouver |
| Bronze medal – third place | 1989 Ipoh |
Junior Asia Cup
| Gold medal – first place | 1988 Karachi |
| Gold medal – first place | 1992 Kuala Lumpur |
| Gold medal – first place | 1996 Singapore |
| Silver medal – second place | 2004 Karachi |
| Silver medal – second place | 2012 Malacca |
| Silver medal – second place | 2015 Kuantan |
| Silver medal – second place | 2023 Salalah |
| Silver medal – second place | 2024 Muscat |
| Bronze medal – third place | 2008 Hyderabad |
| Bronze medal – third place | 2026 Moqi |

The Pakistan men's national under-21 field hockey team is the representative team of Pakistan in international under-21 field hockey competitions. The team is governed by the Pakistan Hockey Federation (PHF), the governing body for field hockey in Pakistan.

The team has participated in various tournaments and has achieved notable success in the past. It won the inaugural edition of the Men's FIH Hockey Junior World Cup in 1979, and came second in the 1993 edition. It also won the first three editions of the Men's Hockey Junior Asia Cup, and came second on five other occasions.

The team is currently ranked 13th in the world, and 3rd in Asia.

== Tournament history ==
The men's national under-21 hockey team from Pakistan has a long history of success in international games. Over the years, they have consistently been title challengers in major tournaments, and have won a number of them. Talented players from the team have gone on to play for the senior national team.

=== Junior World Cup ===
Junior World Cup
| Year | Host city | Position |
|---|---|---|
| 1979 | Versailles, France | 1st |
| 1982 | Kuala Lumpur, Malaysia | 3rd |
| 1985 | Vancouver, Canada | 3rd |
| 1989 | Ipoh, Malaysia | 3rd |
| 1993 | Terrassa, Spain | 2nd |
| 1997 | Milton Keynes, England | 5th |
| 2001 | Hobart, Australia | - |
| 2005 | Rotterdam, Netherlands | 7th |
| 2009 | Johor Bahru, Malaysia Singapore | 5th |
| 2013 | New Delhi, India | 9th |
| 2016 | Lucknow, India | - |
| 2021 | Bhubaneswar, India | 11th |
| 2023 | Kuala Lumpur, Malaysia | 8th |
| 2025 | Tamil Nadu, India | DNP |
| 2027 | TBD | Qualified |

=== Junior Asia Cup ===
Junior Asia Cup record
| Year | Host | Position |
|---|---|---|
| 1988 | Karachi, Pakistan | 1st |
| 1992 | Kuala Lumpur, Malaysia | 1st |
| 1996 | Singapore | 1st |
| 2000 | Kuala Lumpur, Malaysia | 5th |
| 2004 | Karachi, Pakistan | 2nd |
| 2008 | Hyderabad, India | 3rd |
| 2012 | Malacca, Malaysia | 2nd |
| 2015 | Kuantan, Malaysia | 2nd |
| 2021 | Dhaka, Bangladesh | cancelled |
| 2023 | Salalah, Oman | 2nd |
| 2024 | Muscat, Oman | 2nd |
| 2026 | Moqi, China | 3rd |
| Best result | | 1st |

=== Other tournaments ===
Sultan of Johor Cup
| Year | Host city | Position |
|---|---|---|
| 2011 | Johor Bahru, Malaysia | 5th |
| 2012 | Johor Bahru, Malaysia | 4th |
| 2013 | Johor Bahru, Malaysia | 4th |
| 2014 | Johor Bahru, Malaysia | 6th |
| 2015 | Johor Bahru, Malaysia | 6th |
| 2016 | Johor Bahru, Malaysia | 2nd |
| 2017 | Johor Bahru, Malaysia | - |
| 2018 | Johor Bahru, Malaysia | - |
| 2019 | Johor Bahru, Malaysia | - |
| 2022 | Johor Bahru, Malaysia | - |
| 2023 | Johor Bahru, Malaysia | 4th |
| 2025 | Johor Bahru, Malaysia | 4th |
| 2026 | Johor Bahru, Malaysia | 2nd |

== Current squad ==
The following players were part of the Pakistan men's national under-21 field hockey team for the U-21 Men's Junior Hockey Asia Cup in 2023:

| No. | Pos. | Player | Date of birth (age) | Caps | Goals | Club |
|---|---|---|---|---|---|---|
| 1 | GK | Muhammad Faizan Janjua | 18 | 5 | 0 | |
| 12 | GK | Ali Raza (Captain) | 18 | 2 | 0 | |
| 2 | DF | Muhammad Abdullah | 20 | 12 | | (Pakistan Football Federation) Mari Petroleum |
| 2 | DF | Arbaz Ahmad | 20 | 6 | 5 | |
| 4 | DF | Ihtesham Aslam | 20 | 6 | 0 | (Pakistan Football Federation) Mari Petroleum |
| 5 | DF | Muhammad Khan | 18 | 6 | 4 | |
| 6 | DF | Aqeel Ahmad | 18 | 12 | | (Pakistan Football Federation) WAPDA |
| 7 | MF | Zakriya Hayat | 18 | 6 | 1 | (Pakistan Football Federation) Pakistan Navy |
| 8 | MF | Arshad Liaquat | 20 | 6 | 1 | (Pakistan Football Federation) Mari Petroleum |
| 9 | MF | Abdul Hanan Shahid | 17 | 12 | | (Pakistan Football Federation) WAPDA |
| 11 | MF | Ali Murtaza | 18 | 6 | 0 | |
| 11 | | Abdul Qayyum | 18 | 6 | 1 | |
| 13 | | Basharat Ali | 16 | 6 | 3 | |
| 14 | | Bilal Akram | 18 | 4 | 1 | |
| 15 | | Abdul Wahab | 19 | 6 | 3 | |
| 16 | | Arbaz Ayaz | 19 | 4 | 0 | |
| 17 | | Muhammad Murtaza | 19 | 6 | 2 | |
| 18 | FW | Abdul Rehman | 18 | 12 | 9 | |

== See also ==
- Pakistan men's national field hockey team
- Pakistan women's national field hockey team
