= Ramandeep Singh (field hockey, born 1993) =

Indian field hockey player (born 1993)

Personal information
- Born: 1 April 1993 (age 33) Gurdaspur district, Punjab, India
- Height: 1.78 m (5 ft 10 in)

Sport
- Sport: Field hockey
- Position: Forward
Senior career
Years	Team	Caps	Goals
–	Uttar Pradesh Wizards	-	-
National team
Years	Team	Caps	Goals
2013	India U21	15	-
2013–	India	138	(53)
Medal record
Men's field hockey
Representing India
Asian Games
Gold medal – first place	2014 Incheon	Team
Asia Cup
Gold medal – first place	2017 Dhaka	Team
Silver medal – second place	2013 Ipoh	Team
Champions Trophy
Silver medal – second place	2018 Breda	Team
Asian Champions Trophy
Gold medal – first place	2016 Kuantan	Team
Commonwealth Games
Silver medal – second place	2014 Glasgow	Team
Hockey World League
Bronze medal – third place	2014–15 Raipur	Team

Ramandeep Singh (born 1 April 1993) is an Indian field hockey player who plays as a forward. He was named in the Indian squad for the 2016 Summer Olympics. He is currently serving as DSP of Punjab.
