= Jack Waller (field hockey) =

English field hockey player (born 1997)

Personal information
- Born: 28 January 1997 (age 29) Kingston upon Thames, England
- Height: 1.76 m (5 ft 9 in)

Sport
- Sport: Field hockey
- Position: Defender
Senior career
Years	Team	Caps	Goals
2014–2015	Wimbledon	-	-
2015–2018	Durham University	-	-
2018–2021	Wimbledon	-	-
2021–2022	Gantoise	-	-
2022–2024	Wimbledon	-	-
2024–present	Pinoké	-	-
National team
Years	Team	Caps	Goals
2015–2017	England & GB U21	32	(3)
2018–present	England & GB	126	(8)
Medal record
Men's field hockey
Representing England
EuroHockey Championship
Silver medal – second place	2023 Mönchengladbach
Commonwealth Games
Bronze medal – third place	2022 Birmingham	Team

Jack Laurence Waller (born 28 January 1997) is an English field hockey player, who plays as a defender or midfielder for Dutch Hoofdklasse Club Pinoké and the England and Great Britain national teams. He competed at the 2020 Summer Olympics and 2024 Summer Olympics.

== Biography ==
Waller was educated at Whitgift School, South Croydon, London. He completed his higher education at Durham University.

Waller played club hockey in the Men's England Hockey League Premier Division for Wimbledon and then Durham University. While at Durham he made his senior international debuts in October 2018, for Great Britain v Belgium on 2 October 2018 and for England v France on 16 October 2018.

On 27 April 2021 it was announced that Waller had signed for Belgian club Gantoise for the 2021–22 season. Later that year he was selected to represent Great Britain in the delayed 2020 Olympic Games in Tokyo.

He won a bronze medal with England in the Men's tournament at the 2022 Commonwealth Games in Birmingham.

After one season in Belgium he returned to Wimbledon for the 2022-2023 season. He won a silver medal with England at the 2023 Men's EuroHockey Championship in Mönchengladbach.

In 2024 he moved to the Netherlands to play for Pinoké.

He was selected to represent Great Britain at the 2024 Summer Olympics. The team went out in the quarter-finals after losing a penalty shootout to India.
