= Shahril Saabah =

Malaysian field hockey player (born 1994)

Muhammad Shahril Saabah
Personal information
- Born: 28 March 1994 (age 32) Kuala Lumpur, Malaysia
- Height: 1.73 m (5 ft 8 in)
- Weight: 74 kg (163 lb)

Sport
- Sport: Field hockey
- Position: Midfielder
Senior career
Years	Team	Caps	Goals
2011–2012	Kuala Lumpur HC	-	-
2013	Terengganu HT	-	-
National team
Years	Team	Caps	Goals
2013–2015	Malaysia U21	46	-
2014–	Malaysia	113	-
Medal record
Men's field hockey
Asian Games
Silver medal – second place	2018 Jakarta-Palembang	Team
Asia Cup
Silver medal – second place	2017 Dhaka
Silver medal – second place	2022 Jakarta
Asian Champions Trophy
Bronze medal – third place	2011 Ordos
Bronze medal – third place	2012 Doha
Bronze medal – third place	2016 Kuantan
Southeast Asian Games
Gold medal – first place	2017 Kuala Lumpur	Team

Muhammad Shahril Saabah (born 28 March 1994) is a Malaysian field hockey player.

In 2011, he made his debut with the senior national team in the inaugural Asian Champions Trophy. In the same year he won the Sultan of Johor Cup with the Project 2013 squad scoring a goal in the final against Australia.
