= Satbir Singh (field hockey) =

Indian field hockey player (born 1993)

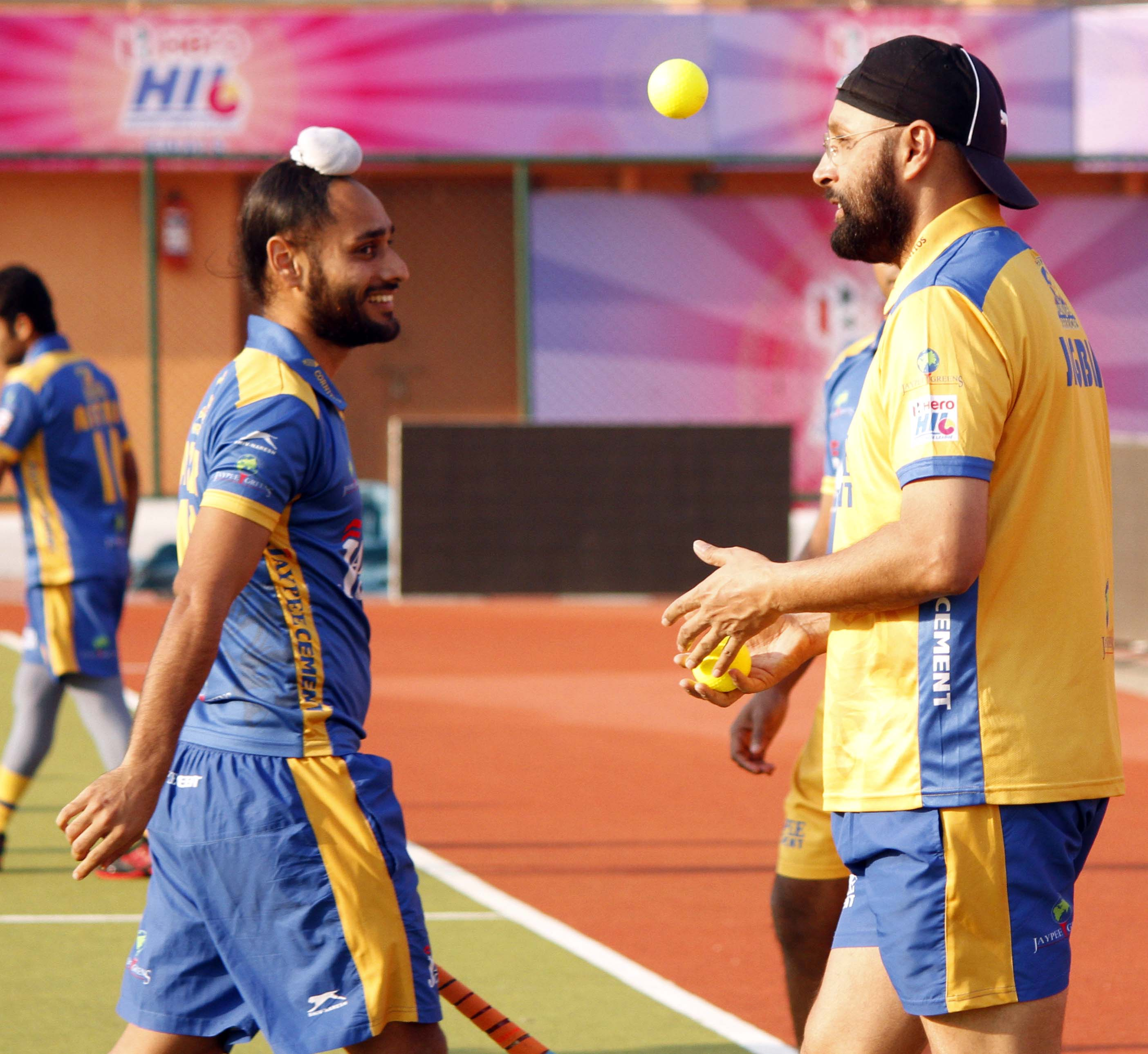
- Satbir (left) with Punjab Warriors coach Jagbir Singh (right)

Personal information
- Born: 22 October 1993 (age 32) Gurdaspur, Punjab, India

Sport
- Sport: Field hockey
- Position: Midfielder
National team
Years	Team	Caps	Goals
2014–	India		-
Medal record
Asia Cup
Gold medal – first place	2017 Dhaka

Satbir Singh (born 22 October 1993) is an Indian field hockey player who plays as a midfielder. He plays for Punjab Warriors in the Hockey India League.
