= Sultan of Johor Cup =

Malaysian youth field hockey tournament

- Most recent season or competition: 2026 Sultan of Johor Cup
- Sport: Field hockey
- Founded: 2011; 15 years ago
- First season: 2011
- No. of teams: 5
- Country: Malaysia
- Venue: Taman Daya Hockey Stadium
- Most recent champion: Malaysia (2nd title) (2026)
- Most titles: Great Britain (4 titles)
- Website: sultanjohorcup

The Sultan of Johor Cup is an annual, international under-21 men's field hockey tournament held in Malaysia.

Since the first edition held in 2011, five teams have emerged victorious. Great Britain is the most successful team having won the tournament four times. India and Australia have won the tournament thrice. Germany and Malaysia have won the tournament twice.

== Results ==
=== Summaries ===
#	Year	Host	Final			Third place game		
#	Year	Host	Winner	Score	Runner-up	Third place	Score	Fourth place
1	2011; Details	Johor Bahru, Malaysia	Malaysia	3–2 (a.e.t)	Australia	South Korea	4–3 (a.e.t)	India
2	2012; Details	Johor Bahru, Malaysia	Germany	3–2	India	Australia	3–2 (a.e.t)	Pakistan
3	2013; Details	Johor Bahru, Malaysia	India	3–0	Malaysia	Argentina	0–0 (3–0 s.o.)	Pakistan
4	2014; Details	Johor Bahru, Malaysia	India	2–1	Great Britain	Australia	6–2	New Zealand
5	2015; Details	Johor Bahru, Malaysia	Great Britain	2–2 (4–3 s.o.)	India	Malaysia	3–2	Argentina
6	2016; Details	Johor Bahru, Malaysia	Australia	3–1	Pakistan	Japan	2–2 (4–1 s.o.)	England
7	2017; Details	Johor Bahru, Malaysia	Australia	2–0	Great Britain	India	4–0	Malaysia
8	2018; Details	Johor Bahru, Malaysia	Great Britain	3–2	India	Australia	6–1	Japan
9	2019; Details	Johor Bahru, Malaysia	Great Britain	2–1	India	Malaysia	3–2	Japan
-	2020	Johor Bahru, Malaysia	Cancelled due to the COVID-19 pandemic.			Cancelled		
-	2021	Johor Bahru, Malaysia	Cancelled due to the COVID-19 pandemic.			Cancelled		
10	2022; Details	Johor Bahru, Malaysia	India	1–1 (5–4 s.o.)	Australia	Great Britain	3–1	Japan
11	2023; Details	Johor Bahru, Malaysia	Germany	0–0 (3–1 s.o.)	Australia	India	3–3 (6–5 s.o.)	Pakistan
12	2024; Details	Johor Bahru, Malaysia	Great Britain	3–2	Australia	India	2–2 (3–2 s.o.)	New Zealand
13	2025; Details	Johor Bahru, Malaysia	Australia	2–1	India	Great Britain	3–2	Pakistan
14	2026; Details	Johor Bahru, Malaysia	Malaysia	2–2 (4–3 s.o.)	Pakistan	Japan	5–0	Canada

=== Successful national teams ===
Below is a list of teams that have finished in the top four positions in the tournament:

Team	Winners	Runners-up	Third place	Fourth place
Great Britain	4 (2015, 2018, 2019, 2024)	2 (2014, 2017)	2 (2022, 2025)	1 (2016)
India	3 (2013, 2014, 2022)	5 (2012, 2015, 2018, 2019, 2025)	3 (2017, 2023, 2024)	1 (2011)
Australia	3 (2016, 2017, 2025)	4 (2011, 2022, 2023, 2024)	3 (2012, 2014, 2018)	
Malaysia	2 (2011, 2026)	1 (2013)	2 (2015, 2019)	1 (2017)
Germany	2 (2012, 2023)			
Pakistan		2 (2016, 2026)		4 (2012, 2013, 2023, 2025)
Japan			2 (2016, 2026)	3 (2018, 2019, 2022)
Argentina			1 (2013)	1 (2015)
South Korea			1 (2011)	
New Zealand				2 (2014, 2024)
Canada				1 (2026)

* = includes results representing England

=== Team appearances ===
Team	2011	2012	2013	2014	2015	2016	2017	2018	2019	2022	2023	2024	2025	2026	Total
Argentina	–	–	3rd	–	4th	–	–	–	–	–	–	–	–	–	2
Australia	2nd	3rd	–	3rd	5th	1st	1st	3rd	5th	2nd	2nd	2nd	1st	–	12
Canada	–	–	–	–	–	–	–	–	–	–	–	–	–	4th	1
China	–	–	–	–	–	–	–	–	–	–	–	–	–	5th	1
India	4th	2nd	1st	1st	2nd	–	3rd	2nd	2nd	1st	3rd	3rd	2nd	–	12
Germany	–	1st	–	–	–	–	–	–	–	–	1st	–	–	–	2
Great Britain*	–	–	6th	2nd	1st	4th	2nd	1st	1st	3rd	5th	1st	3rd	–	11
Japan	–	–	–	–	–	3rd	5th	4th	4th	4th	–	5th	–	3rd	7
Malaysia	1st	6th	2nd	5th	3rd	5th	4th	5th	3rd	6th	7th	6th	5th	1st	14
New Zealand	6th	5th	–	4th	–	6th	–	6th	6th	–	6th	4th	6th	–	9
Pakistan	5th	4th	4th	6th	6th	2nd	–	–	–	–	4th	–	4th	2nd	9
South Africa	–	–	–	–	–	–	–	–	–	5th	8th	–	–	–	2
South Korea	3rd	–	5th	–	–	–	–	–	–	–	–	–	–	–	2
United States	–	–	–	–	–	–	6th	–	–	–	–	–	–	–	1
Total (12)	6	6	6	6	6	6	6	6	6	6	8	6	6	5	

* = includes results representing England, Scotland and Wales

== See also ==
- Sultan Azlan Shah Cup
- Malaysian Hockey Confederation
