= Taman Daya Hockey Stadium =

Hockey stadium in Johor Bahru, Johor, Malaysia

Coordinates: 1°32′34.4″N 103°45′37.0″E

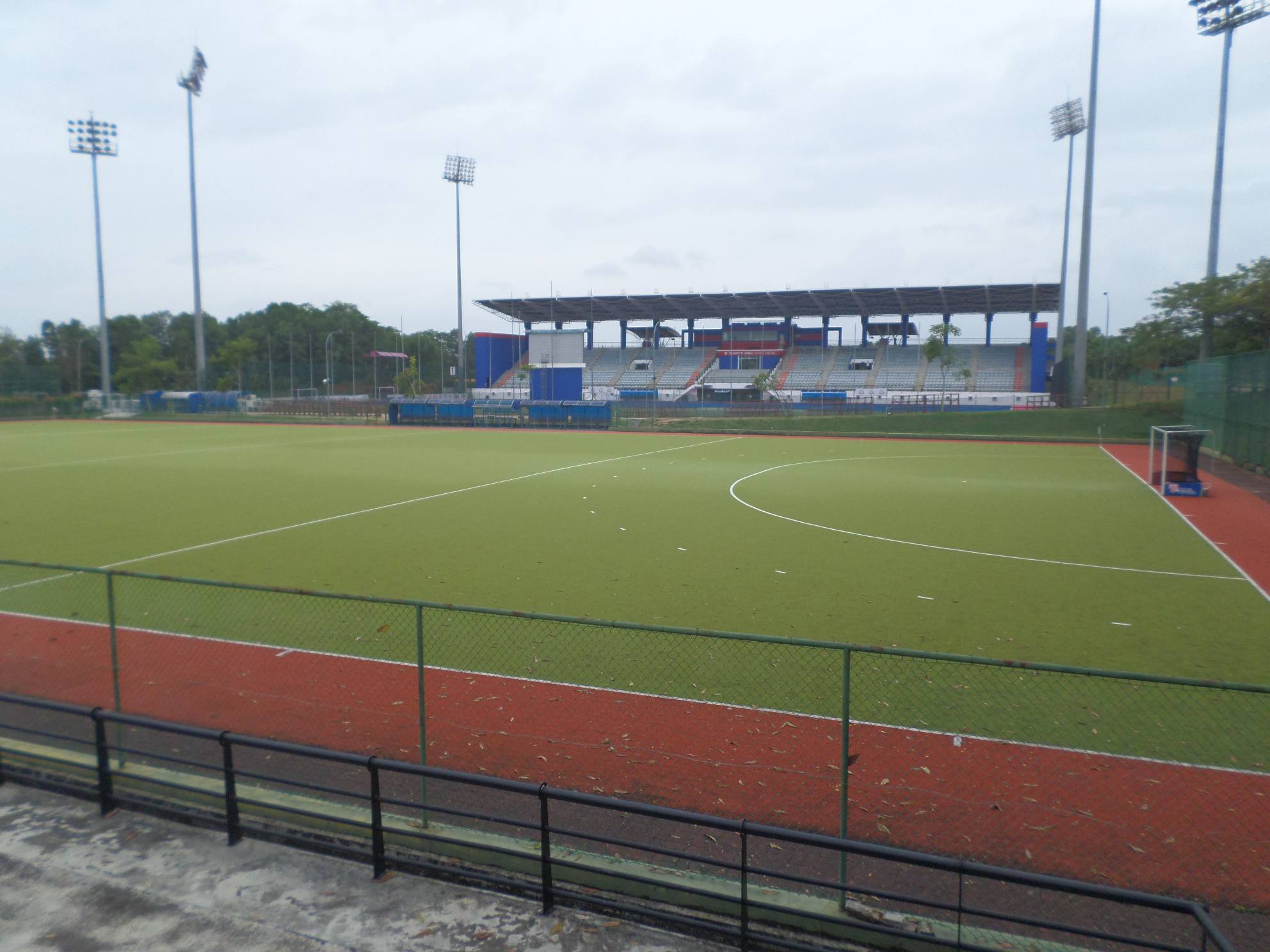
- Interactive map of Taman Daya Hockey Stadium
- Location: Tebrau, Johor Bahru, Johor, Malaysia
- Capacity: 5,000
- Type: Hockey stadium

The Taman Daya Hockey Stadium or Johor State Hockey Stadium is the hockey stadium in Taman Daya, Tebrau, Johor Bahru District, Johor, Malaysia.

== Events ==
- 2009 Men's Hockey Junior World Cup
- Sultan of Johor Cup

== See also ==
- Sport in Malaysia
