= 2025–26 Men's FIH Pro League squads =

This article lists the squads of all participating teams in the 2025–26 Men's FIH Pro League.

== Argentina ==
The following is the Argentina squad for the 2025–26 FIH Pro League.

Head coach: Lucas Rey

1. Tomás Santiago (GK)
3. Nicolás Rodríguez
4. Juan Catán
5. Facundo Zárate
6. Matteo Fernández
7. Nicolás Keenan
8. Tobías Martins
9. Maico Casella (C)
10. Nicolás Della Torre
11. Lucas Toscani
12. Nehuen Hernando (GK)
14. Ignacio Nardolillo
15. Tomás Ruiz
16. Joaquín Toscani
17. Santiago Tarazona
18. Facundo Sarto
19. Lautaro Domene
20. Matías Andreotti
21. Tomás Domene
22. Matías Rey (C)
23. Lucas Martínez
24. Joaquín Kruger
25. Joaquín Ruiz (GK)
26. Nicolás Cicileo
27. Tadeo Marcucci
28. Ignacio Ibarra
29. Thomas Habif
30. Martín Ferreiro
31. Bautista Capurro
32. Bruno Correa
33. Lucio Méndez
35. Jaime Terzi
36. Lucas Redondo
38. Agustín Bonanno
39. Franco Agostini
40. Tomás Suárez
41. Francisco Ruiz
42. Iñaki Minadeo
44. Santiago Binaghi
46. Santos Milito
55. Felipe Merlini

== Australia ==
The following is the Australia squad for the 2025–26 FIH Pro League.

Head coach: Mark Hager

1. Lachlan Sharp
2. Thomas Craig
3. Dylan Downey
4. Lachlan Rogers
5. Cooper Burns
6. Anand Gupte
7. Nathan Ephraums
8. Connar Otterbach
9. Liam Henderson
10. Joshua Beltz (C)
11. Ian Grobbelaar
12. Jed Snowden (GK)
13. Blake Govers
15. Jayden Atkinson
16. Timothy Howard (C)
19. Craig Marais
20. Ky Willott
21. Jack Welch
23. Hayden Beltz
24. Cambell Geddes
25. Nathan Czinner
26. James Collins
27. Joel Rintala
28. Ashleigh Thomas (GK)
29. Timothy Brand
30. Davis Atkin
31. Magnus McCausland (GK)
32. Jeremy Hayward (C)
25. Oliver Stebbings
44. Noah Fahy
46. Hayden Pease
49. Dylan Brick
50. Max Freedman
53. Nye Roberts
57. Daykin Stanger
58. Matthew Hawthorne
62. Toby Mallon
72. Max Larkin (GK)

== Belgium ==
The following is the Belgium squad for the 2025–26 FIH Pro League.

Head coach: (New Zealand) Shane McLeod

1. Simon Vandenbroucke (GK)
4. Arthur van Doren (C)
5. Arno van Dessel
6. Lucas Balthazar
7. Thibeau Stockbroekx
9. Maxime van Oost
11. Tommy Willems
13. Nicolas de Kerpel
14. Loic van Doren (GK)
15. Louis de Backer
16. Alexander Hendrickx
17. Guillaume Hellin
18. Roman Duvekot
21. Vincent Vanasch (GK)
22. Victor Foubert
23. Arthur de Sloover
26. Victor Wegnez
27. Tom Boon
28. Tobias Biekens
30. Nelson Onana
32. Jack Vloeberghs
33. Hugo Labouchere
34. Oliver Biekens
37. Thomas Crols
40. Emile Batille (GK)
41. Gaspard Cornez-Massant
42. Victor Maeyens
43. Boris Feldheim (GK)
44. Hugues Molenaar
45. Joyd Poels
46. Nicolas Bogaerts
47. Guerlain Hawaux
48. Maximilian Langer
49. Nathan Rogge
50. Marin van Heel
51. Jean Cloetens
52. Mathias François
53. Charles Langendries
54. Mathis Lauwers
55. Benjamin Thiéry
56. Jules de Cleene
57. Sacha Kinnen
61. Alexis van Havere (GK)

== England ==
The following is the England squad for the 2025–26 FIH Pro League.

Head coach: Zak Jones

2. Nicholas Park
3. Jack Waller
4. Rohan Bhuhi
5. Thomas Sorsby
7. Zachary Wallace (C)
8. Jacob Payton
9. Henry Croft
13. Samuel Ward
14. James Albery
15. Phillip Roper
16. James Mazarelo (GK)
17. Stuart Rushmere
18. Timothy Nurse
19. David Goodfield
20. Oliver Payne (GK)
23. Nicholas Bandurak
24. James Oates
26. James Gall
27. Liam Sanford
30. Conor Williamson
31. William Calnan
32. James Carleton (GK)
33. Samuel Hooper
46. Sam Taylor
47. Benjamin Fox
48. Rory Penrose
49. Ellis Robson
51. Jonathan Sturch-Hibbitt
52. Alex Chihota
53. Max Anderson
68. Matthew Hughson
69. Michael Royden
77. Matthew Ramshaw
80. Yuvraj Bhuhi (GK)

== Germany ==
The following is the Germany squad for the 2025–26 FIH Pro League.

Head coach: André Henning

1. Alexander Stadler (GK)
5. Linus Müller
6. Raphael Hartkopf
7. Justus Warweg
8. Benedikt Schwarzhaupt
10. Johannes Große
11. Thies Prinz
12. Timm Herzbruch
13. Paul-Philipp Kaufmann
14. Teo Hinrichs
15. Tom Grambusch (C)
16. Gonzalo Peillat
17. Christopher Rühr
19. Justus Weigand
20. Niklas Bosserhoff
21. Michel Struthoff
22. Hugo von Montgelas
23. Martin Zwicker
24. Erik Kleinlein
25. Hannes Müller
26. Elian Mazkour
27. Julius Hayner
29. Malte Hellwig
30. Henrik Mertgens
31. Adrian Lehmann-Richter
33. Luca Wolff
34. Jakob Brilla
36. Mario Schachner
37. Paul Smith
38. Antheus Barry
39. Joshua Onyekwue Nnaji (GK)
40. Ben Hasbach
41. Matteo Poljaric
42. Paul Glander
43. Moritz Ludwig
44. Luis Geisler (GK)
65. Phillip Holzmüller
74. Jean-Paul Danneberg (GK)
77. Jasper Ditzer (GK)
99. Florian Sperling

== India ==
The following is the India squad for the 2025–26 FIH Pro League.

Head coach: (South Africa) Craig Fulton

2. Dilpreet Singh
3. Varun Kumar
4. Jarmanpreet Singh
5. Abhishek Nain
6. Manpreet Singh
7. Hardik Singh
11. Mandeep Singh
12. Krishan Bahadur Pathak (GK)
13. Harmanpreet Singh (C)
15. Nilam Xess
17. Sumit Walmiki
18. Nilakanta Sharma
20. Ankit Malik (GK)
22. Boby Singh Dhami
23. Uttam Singh
24. Rosan Kujur
25. Raj Kumar Pal
27. Mohith Shashikumar (GK)
29. Rabichandra Moirangthem
30. Amit Rohidas
31. Jugraj Singh
32. Vivek Sagar Prasad
34. Sukhjeet Singh
35. Mohammed Raheel
37. Angad Bir Singh
39. Maninder Singh
40. Vishnukant Singh
42. Aditya Lalage
43. Parmod
44. Arshdeep Singh
45. Venkatesh Kenche
47. Yashdeep Siwach
48. Pardeep Singh
50. Selvam Karthi
55. Ravneet Singh
70. Sanjay Rana
71. Pawan Malik (GK)
77. Suraj Karkera (GK)
78. Rajinder Singh
79. Sharda Nand Tiwari
82. Gurjot Singh
84. Amir Ali
88. Bikramjit Singh (GK)
90. Araijeet Singh Hundal
91. Rohit
93. Poovanna Chandura Boby
94. Ankit Pal
95. Ashu Maurya
97. Sunil Palakshappa Bennur
98. Sudeep Chirmako
99. Shilanand Lakra

== Netherlands ==
The following is the Netherlands squad for the 2025–26 FIH Pro League.

Head coach: Jeroen Delmee

1. Maurits Visser (GK)
2. Jip Janssen
4. Lars Balk
6. Jonas de Geus
7. Thijs van Dam
8. Thierry Brinkman (C)
9. Koen Bijen
10. Jorrit Croon
11. Terrance Pieters
12. Justen Blok
13. Joep Troost
14. Derck de Vilder
15. David Huussen
16. Floris Wortelboer
18. Olivier Hortensius
19. Tjep Hoedemakers
20. Derk Meijer (GK)
21. Guus Jansen
22. Pepijn van der Heijden
23. Joep de Mol
24. Steijn van Heijningen
27. Timo Boers
28. Lucas Veen
29. Tijmen Reijenga
32. Hidde Brink (GK)
33. Miles Bukkens
34. Daan Bonhof
40. Luke Dommershuijzen
51. Duco Telgenkamp
77. Floris Middendorp

== Pakistan ==
The following is the Pakistan squad for the 2025–26 FIH Pro League.

Head coaches: Muhammad Usman and Tahir Zaman

1. Abdullah Ishtiaq Khan (GK)
2. Muhammad Abdullah
3. Arbaz Ahmad
3. Mubashar Ali
4. Nadeem Khan
5. Sufyan Khan
6. Waleed Rana
7. Moin Shakeel
8. Waheed Rana
9. Hannan Shahid
10. Zikriya Hayat
11. Arshad Liaqat
12. Ali Raza (GK)
13. Usama Bashir
14. Ahmad Nadeem
15. Ghazanfar Ali
16. Ammad Butt (C)
17. Muhammad Hammadudin
18. Rehman Abdul
21. Afraz
27. Abu Mahmood
32. Abdul Mana
32. Muhammad Ammad
44. Waqar (GK)
56. Muneeb Ur-Rehman (GK)
99. Junaid Manzoor

== Spain ==
The following is the Spain squad for the 2025–26 FIH Pro League.

Head coach: (Argentina) Maximiliano Caldas

1. Adrian Rafi (GK)
2. Alejandro Alonso
4. Álvaro Portugal
5. Jordi Bonastre
6. Xavier Gispert
7. Rafael Vilallonga
8. Marc Recasens
9. Borja Lacalle
10. José Basterra
11. Gerard Clapés
12. Marc Reyné
13. Eduard de Ignacio-Simó
14. Marc Miralles (C)
15. Luis Calzado (GK)
16. Rafael Revilla (GK)
17. Pepe Cunill
18. Joaquín Menini
19. Cesár Curiel
20. Pau Cunill
22. Pol Cabré-Verdiell
23. Marc Vizcaino
24. Manuel Rodríguez
25. Pau Petchamé
26. Bruno Font
27. Pere Amat
28. Nicolás Álvarez
29. Aleix Bozal
30. Pablo Monterrubio
31. Gonzalo Quijano
32. Andrés Medina
34. Ignacio Abajo
35. Iñaky Zaldúa
37. Andreas Rafi
44. Guiu Coromina
62. Ignacio Cobos
63. Guillermo Fortuño
67. Bruno Ávila
71. Oriol Bozal
80. Enric Miralles
87. Pablo Román
