= India men's national field hockey team results (2025–2028) =

- Season: 2025–2028

This page documents the international match results of the India men's national field hockey team from 2025 to 2028. It includes official and unofficial matches and tournaments played during the period, organized chronologically by year and competition.

India won the Asia Cup title in 2025 after 8 years. India finished eighth in the 2026 World Cup. India won the gold at the 2026 Asian Games and booked their spot in the 2028 Olympics.

Competition	1st place, gold medalist(s)	2nd place, silver medalist(s)	3rd place, bronze medalist(s)
Asian Games	1	0	0
Asia Cup	1	0	0
Asian Champions Trophy	1	0	0
Sultan Azlan Shah Cup	0	1	0
Total	3	1	0

== List of tours ==
Year	Host(s)	Competition	GP	W	D	L	GF	GA	Result	Position	Head Coach
2025	N/A	2024–25 Men's FIH Pro League	16	6	0	10	34	38	–	8th	(South Africa) Craig Fulton
2025	India	2025 Men's Hockey Asia Cup	7	6	1	0	39	9	1st place, gold medalist(s)	Champions	(South Africa) Craig Fulton
2025	Malaysia	2025 Sultan Azlan Shah Cup	6	4	0	2	24	12	2nd place, silver medalist(s)	Runners-up	(South Africa) Craig Fulton
2025	South Africa	South Africa Test Series	3	2	1	0	11	5	–	–	(South Africa) Craig Fulton
2026	N/A	2025–26 Men's FIH Pro League	16	4	5	7	31	39	–	8th	(South Africa) Craig Fulton
2026	Belgium (Netherlands) Nederlands	2026 Men's FIH Hockey World Cup	6	2	1	3	17	19	Second round	8th	(South Africa) Craig Fulton
2026	Japan	2026 Asian Games	7	7	0	0	58	8	1st place, gold medalist(s)	Champions	(South Africa) Craig Fulton
2026	India	2026 Men's Asian Champions Trophy	7	7	0	0	46	7	1st place, gold medalist(s)	Champions	(South Africa) Craig Fulton
2026	New Zealand	Indian Centenary Hockey Series	3	1	2	0	7	6	1st place, gold medalist(s)	Champions	(South Africa) Craig Fulton

== 2025 ==
15 February 2025 2024–25 Men's FIH Pro League	India	1–3	Spain	Bhubaneswar, India
19:30	Sukhjeet 25'	Report	Lacalle 28'; Cobos 38'; Ávila 58'	Stadium: Kalinga Stadium

16 February 2025 2024–25 Men's FIH Pro League	India	2–0	Spain	Bhubaneswar, India
19:30	Mandeep 32'; Dilpreet 39'	Report		Stadium: Kalinga Stadium

18 February 2025 2024–25 Men's FIH Pro League	India	1–4	Germany	Bhubaneswar, India
19:30	Gurjant 13'	Report	Sperling 7'; Prinz 14'; Struthoff 48'; Hartkopf 55'	Stadium: Kalinga Stadium

19 February 2025 2024–25 Men's FIH Pro League	India	1–0	Germany	Bhubaneswar, India
17:15	Gurjant 4'	Report		Stadium: Kalinga Stadium

21 February 2025 2024–25 Men's FIH Pro League	India	3–1	Ireland	Bhubaneswar, India
19:30	Mandeep 22'; Jarmanpreet 45'; Sukhjeet 58'	Report	Duncan 8'	Stadium: Kalinga Stadium

22 February 2025 2024–25 Men's FIH Pro League	India	4–0	Ireland	Bhubaneswar, India
19:30	Nilam 14'; Mandeep 24'; Abhishek 28'; Shamsher 34'	Report		Stadium: Kalinga Stadium

24 February 2025 2024–25 Men's FIH Pro League	India	2–3	England	Bhubaneswar, India
19:30	Abhishek 18'; Sukhjeet 39'	Report	Payton 15'; Ward 19', 29'	Stadium: Kalinga Stadium

25 February 2025 2024–25 Men's FIH Pro League	India	2–1	England	Bhubaneswar, India
19:30	Harmanpreet 26', 32'	Report	Williamson 30'	Stadium: Kalinga Stadium

7 June 2025 2024–25 Men's FIH Pro League	Netherlands	2–1	India	Amsterdam, Netherlands
16:00	Van Dam 25', 58'	Report	Harmanpreet 19'	Stadium: Wagener Stadium

9 June 2025 2024–25 Men's FIH Pro League	Netherlands	3–2	India	Amsterdam, Netherlands
14:30	van Dam 24'; Hoedemakers 33'; Janssen 57'	Report	Abhishek 20'; Jugraj 54'	Stadium: Wagener Stadium

11 June 2025 2024–25 Men's FIH Pro League	Argentina	4–3	India	Amsterdam, Netherlands
15:00	Rey 3'; Martínez 17'; Tarazona 34'; Mendez 46'	Report	Harmanpreet 12', 33'; Abhishek 42'	Stadium: Wagener Stadium

12 June 2025 2024–25 Men's FIH Pro League	India	1–2	Argentina	Amsterdam, Netherlands
15:00	Jugraj 4'	Report	Domene 9', 49'	Stadium: Wagener Stadium

14 June 2025 2024–25 Men's FIH Pro League	Australia	3–2	India	Antwerp, Belgium
10:30	Ephraums 42'; Rintala 56'; Craig 60'	Report	Abhishek 8', 35'	Stadium: Wilrijkse Plein Antwerp

15 June 2025 2024–25 Men's FIH Pro League	India	2–3	Australia	Antwerp, Belgium
10:30	Sanjay 3'; Dilpreet 36'	Report	Brand 4'; Govers 5'; Burns 18'	Stadium: Wilrijkse Plein Antwerp

21 June 2025 2024–25 Men's FIH Pro League	Belgium	6–3	India	Antwerp, Belgium
15:30	Doren 1', 54'; Hendrickx 28'; Duvekot 49'; Stockbroekx 53'; Boon 59'	Report	Dilpreet 36'; Mandeep 38'; Rohidas 56'	Stadium: Wilrijkse Plein Antwerp

22 June 2025 2024–25 Men's FIH Pro League	Belgium	3–4	India	Antwerp, Belgium
15:30	Sloover 8'; Stockbroekx 34'; Labouchere 41'	Report	Sukhjeet 21', 35'; Rohidas 36'; Harmanpreet 59'	Stadium: Wilrijkse Plein Antwerp

29 August 2025 2025 Asia Cup GS	India	4–3	China	Rajgir, India
15:00	Jugraj 18'; Harmanpreet 20', 33', 47'	Report	Du 12'; Chen B. 35'; Gao 41'	Stadium: Rajgir Hockey Stadium

31 August 2025 2025 Asia Cup GS	Japan	2–3	India	Rajgir, India
15:00	Kawabe 38', 59'	Report	Mandeep 4'; Harmanpreet 5', 46'	Stadium: Rajgir Hockey Stadium

1 September 2025 2025 Asia Cup GS	India	15–0	Kazakhstan	Rajgir, India
19:30	Abhishek 5', 8', 20', 59'; Sukhjeet 15', 32', 38'; Jugraj 24', 31'; Harmanpreet 26', 47'; Amit 29'; Rajinder 32'; Sanjay 54'; Dilpreet 55'	Report		Stadium: Rajgir Hockey Stadium

3 September 2025 2025 Asia Cup Super4s	India	2–2	South Korea	Rajgir, India
19:30	Hardik 8'; Mandeep 53'	Report	Yang 12'; Kim 14'	Stadium: Rajgir Hockey Stadium

4 September 2025 2025 Asia Cup Super4s	Malaysia	1–4	India	Rajgir, India
19:30	Hassan 2'	Report	Manpreet 17'; Sukhjeet 19'; Lakra 24'; Prasad 38'	Stadium: Rajgir Hockey Stadium

6 September 2025 2025 Asia Cup Super4s	India	7–0	China	Rajgir, India
19:30	Lakra 4'; Dilpreet 7'; Mandeep 18'; Pal 37'; Sukhjeet 39'; Abhishek 46', 50'	Report		Stadium: Rajgir Hockey Stadium

7 September 2025 2025 Asia Cup Final	India	4–1	South Korea	Rajgir, India
19:30	Sukhjeet 1'; Dilpreet 28', 45'; Amit 50'	Report	Son 51'	Stadium: Rajgir Hockey Stadium

23 November 2025 2025 SASC GS	India	1–0	South Korea	Ipoh, Malaysia
16:00	Raheel 15'	Report		Stadium: Azlan Shah Stadium

24 November 2025 2025 SASC GS	Belgium	3–2	India	Ipoh, Malaysia
18:00	Duvekot 17', 46'; De Kerpel 45'	Report	Abhishek 33'; Shilanand 57'	Stadium: Azlan Shah Stadium

26 November 2025 2025 SASC GS	India	4–3	Malaysia	Ipoh, Malaysia
20:00	Selvam 7'; Sukhjeet 31'; Rohidas 39'; Sanjay 53'	Report	Saari 13'; Saari 36'; Jalil 45'	Stadium: Azlan Shah Stadium

27 November 2025 2025 SASC GS	India	3–2	New Zealand	Ipoh, Malaysia
18:00	Rohidas 4'; Sanjay 32'; Selvam 54'	Report	Baker 42', 48'	Stadium: Azlan Shah Stadium

29 November 2025 2025 SASC GS	Canada	3–14	India	Ipoh, Malaysia
16:00	Guraliuk 11'; Sarmento 35'; Sidhu 55'	Report	Sharma 4'; Rajinder 10', 24'; Jugraj 12', 26', 39', 50'; Rohidas 15', 46'; Dilpreet 25'; Selvam 43'; Sanjay 56'; Abhishek 57', 59'	Stadium: Azlan Shah Stadium

30 November 2025 2025 SASC Final	Belgium	1–0	India	Ipoh, Malaysia
20:30	Stockbroekx 34'	Report		Stadium: Azlan Shah Stadium

7 December 2025 Tour of South Africa	South Africa	2–5	India	Stellenbosch, South Africa
20:30 IST	Cassiem 4'; Mbata 39'	Report	Lakra 12'; Aditya 14'; Rohidas 48'; Harmanpreet 53'; Dilpreet 55'	Stadium: Stellenbosch University

8 December 2025 Tour of South Africa	South Africa	2–2	India	Cape Town, South Africa
22:30 IST	Cassiem 31'; Neethling 37'	Report	Harmanpreet 4', 49'	Stadium: Hartleyvale Stadium

10 December 2025 Tour of South Africa	South Africa	1–4	India	Cape Town, South Africa
22:30 IST	Horan	Report	Sukhjeet; Rohidas; Hardik; Mandeep	Stadium: Hartleyvale Stadium

== 2026 ==
11 February 2026 Pro League India leg	India	1–3	Belgium	Rourkela, India
19:30	Lakra 29'	Report	Onana 23'; Crols 53'; Van Dessel 57'	Stadium: Birsa Munda International Hockey Stadium

12 February 2026 Pro League India leg	India	0–8	Argentina	Rourkela, India
19:30		Report	Ruiz 14'; Domene 15', 20', 26', 60'; Mendez 22'; Ibarra 25' della Torre 30'	Stadium: Birsa Munda International Hockey Stadium

14 February 2026 Pro League India leg	India	2–4	Belgium	Rourkela, India
19:30	Aditya 24'; Harmanpreet 37'	Report	Labouchere 11'; Hendrickx 14', 17'; Sloover 15'	Stadium: Birsa Munda International Hockey Stadium

15 February 2026 Pro League India leg	India	2–4	Argentina	Rourkela, India
19:30	Aditya 50'; Sanjay 59'	Report	Domene 18'; Marcucci 28', 49'; Mendez 43'	Stadium: Birsa Munda International Hockey Stadium

21 February 2026 Pro League Australia leg	India	0–2	Spain	Hobart, Australia
12:00		Report	Abajo 6'; Cobos 36'	Stadium: Tasmanian Hockey Centre

22 February 2026 Pro League Australia leg	Australia	2–2 (5–4 p)	India	Hobart, Australia
12:00	Rintala 47', 56'	Report	Rohidas 15'; Jugraj 43'	Stadium: Tasmanian Hockey Centre
	Penalties
	Brand (penalty shoot-out scored); Henderson (penalty shoot-out scored); Howard (penalty shoot-out scored); Welch (penalty shoot-out scored); Craig (penalty shoot-out scored)		(penalty shoot-out scored) Lakra; (penalty shoot-out scored) Maninder; (penalty shoot-out scored) Pal; (penalty shoot-out scored) Jugraj; (penalty shoot-out missed) Aditya

24 February 2026 Pro League Australia leg	Spain	1–1 (4–3 p)	India	Hobart, Australia
14:00	Font 59'	Report	Maninder 19'	Stadium: Tasmanian Hockey Centre
	Penalties
	Bonastre (penalty shoot-out scored); Recasens (penalty shoot-out scored); Cabre Verdiell (penalty shoot-out scored); Font (penalty shoot-out scored)		(penalty shoot-out scored) Lakra; (penalty shoot-out scored) Maninder; (penalty shoot-out missed) Abhishek; (penalty shoot-out scored) Pal; (penalty shoot-out missed) Hardik

25 February 2026 Pro League Australia leg	Australia	1–1 (1–3 p)	India	Hobart, Australia
14:00	Hayward 49'	Report	Lakra 51'	Stadium: Tasmanian Hockey Centre
	Penalties
	Brand (penalty shoot-out missed); Henderson (penalty shoot-out missed); Burns (penalty shoot-out missed); Hayward (penalty shoot-out scored)		(penalty shoot-out scored) Lakra; (penalty shoot-out scored) Maninder; (penalty shoot-out missed) Abhishek; (penalty shoot-out scored) Vishnukant

14 June 2026 Pro League Netherlands leg	Netherlands	3–2	India	Rotterdam, Netherlands
19:30	Bukkens 3'; Bijen 23'; Reyenga 40'	Report	Dilpreet 10'; Sukhjeet 33'	Stadium: Hazelaarweg Stadion

17 June 2026 Pro League Netherlands leg	India	3–1	Germany	Rotterdam, Netherlands
23:00	Mandeep 7'; Lakra 13'; Nilakanta 35'	Report	Hartkopf 45'	Stadium: Hazelaarweg Stadion

18 June 2026 Pro League Netherlands leg	Germany	2–1	India	Rotterdam, Netherlands
23:00	Weigand 56'; Brilla 60'	Report	Jugraj 38'	Stadium: Hazelaarweg Stadion

21 June 2026 Pro League Netherlands leg	Netherlands	2–3	India	Rotterdam, Netherlands
17:30	Heijden 19'; Bijen 59'	Report	Jugraj 18'; Abhishek 27'; Rajinder 56'	Stadium: Hazelaarweg Stadion

23 June 2026 Pro League England leg	Pakistan	3–4	India	London, United Kingdom
19:00	Nadeem 8'; Mahmood 53'; Shakeel 60+'	Report	Abhishek 22'; Nilakanta 24'; Sukhjeet 40'; Rajinder 52'	Stadium: Lee Valley Hockey and Tennis Centre

26 June 2026 Pro League England leg	England	2–2 (4–1 p)	India	London, United Kingdom
00:00	Goodfield 29'; Bandurak 56'	Report	Dilpreet 10', 58'	Stadium: Lee Valley Hockey and Tennis Centre
	Penalties
	Sorsby (penalty shoot-out scored); Albery (penalty shoot-out scored); Wallace (penalty shoot-out scored); Wallace (penalty shoot-out scored)		(penalty shoot-out scored) Harmanpreet; (penalty shoot-out missed) Sukhjeet; (penalty shoot-out missed) Vivek

26 June 2026 Pro League England leg	India	7–1	Pakistan	London, United Kingdom
22:30	Sukhjeet 20'; Harmanpreet 26'; Hardik 34'; Jugraj 35'; Abhishek 41'; Pal 44'; Dilpreet 54'	Report	Mahmood 13'	Stadium: Lee Valley Hockey and Tennis Centre

28 June 2026 Pro League England leg	England	0–0 (2–3 p)	India	London, United Kingdom
20:30		Report		Stadium: Lee Valley Hockey and Tennis Centre
	Penalties
	Wallace (penalty shoot-out scored); Sorsby (penalty shoot-out missed); Croft (penalty shoot-out missed); Goodfield (penalty shoot-out scored); Waller (penalty shoot-out missed)		(penalty shoot-out missed) Sukhjeet; (penalty shoot-out scored) Abhishek; (penalty shoot-out scored) Lakra; (penalty shoot-out scored) Hardik; (penalty shoot-out missed) Dilpreet

15 August 2026 World Cup Pool D	India	3–1	Wales	Amstelveen, Netherlands
16:30	Sanjay 8'; Harmanpreet 11', 43'	Report	Welsh 56'	Stadium: Wagener Stadium

17 August 2026 World Cup Pool D	India	2–4	England	Amstelveen, Netherlands
18:30	Harmanpreet 17'; Dilpreet 25'	Report	Bandurak 14', 55'; Rushmere 39'; Croft 43'	Stadium: Wagener Stadium

19 August 2026 World Cup Pool D	Pakistan	3–5	India	Amstelveen, Netherlands
18:30	Shahid 22', 46'; Khan 24'	Report	Harmanpreet 5', 21'; Abhishek 11', 24'; Hardik 35'	Stadium: Wagener Stadium

22 August 2026 World Cup Pool E	Netherlands	3–1	India	Amstelveen, Netherlands
19:30	Telgenkamp 41'; Hoedemakers 51'; Van Dam 55'	Report	Harmanpreet 52'	Stadium: Wagener Stadium

24 August 2026 World Cup Pool E	Argentina	5–3	India	Amstelveen, Netherlands
18:15	J. Toscani 1' della Torre 6'; Domene 33', 45'; L. Toscani 53'	Report	Sukhjeet 10', 58'; Hardik 60'	Stadium: Wagener Stadium

28 August 2026 World Cup 7th place match	India	3–3 (3–4 p)	Belgium	Wavre, Belgium
21:45	Abhishek 6'; Harmanpreet 31', 60'	Report	Duvekot 22'; Labouchere 23' de Sloover 47'	Stadium: Belfius Hockey Arena
	Penalties
	Harmanpreet (penalty shoot-out missed); Sukhjeet (penalty shoot-out missed); Lakra (penalty shoot-out scored); Dilpreet (penalty shoot-out scored); Abhishek (penalty shoot-out scored)		(penalty shoot-out scored) Boon; (penalty shoot-out missed) Foubert; (penalty shoot-out scored) de Sloover; (penalty shoot-out scored) Hendrickx; (penalty shoot-out scored) Duvekot

20 September 2026 Asian Games Pool A	India	13–1	Indonesia	Kakamigahara, Japan
11:30	Shilanand 6', 35'; Abhishek 12'; Dilpreet 18', 19', 37', 49'; Rajinder 19'; Mandeep 21'; Harmanpreet 28'; Sukhjeet 38', 48'; Jugraj 46'	Report	Al Ardh 33'	Stadium: Gifu Prefectural Green Stadium

22 September 2026 Asian Games Pool A	India	16–1	Sri Lanka	Kakamigahara, Japan
15:30	Mandeep 5'; Jugraj 10', 22', 42', 53'; Abhishek 11', 17', 49'; Harmanpreet 16', 45'; Sukhjeet 29'; Dilpreet 30', 38', 55'; Manpreet 31'; Prasad 36'	Report	Rathnayake 50'	Stadium: Gifu Prefectural Green Stadium

24 September 2026 Asian Games Pool A	South Korea	2–8	India	Kakamigahara, Japan
11:30	Kim J. 42'; Kim Y. 52'	Report	Lakra 4'; Sukhjeet 10'; Harmanpreet 11'; Abhishek 15', 38'; Dilpreet 26', 32'; Rajinder 60'	Stadium: Gifu Prefectural Green Stadium

26 September 2026 Asian Games Pool A	Japan	0–2	India	Kakamigahara, Japan
13:30		Report	Abhishek 15'; Harmanpreet 40'	Stadium: Gifu Prefectural Green Stadium

28 September 2026 Asian Games Pool A	India	10–0	Bangladesh	Kakamigahara, Japan
16:00	Abhishek 3'; Jugraj 22'; Harmanpreet 27', 40', 45'; Sukhjeet 32'; Lakra 44', 45'; Sanjay 59'; Mandeep 60'	Report		Stadium: Gifu Prefectural Green Stadium

1 October 2026 Asian Games Semi-final	India	4–3	Pakistan	Kakamigahara, Japan
13:00	Harmanpreet 5', 13'; Sukhjeet 23'; Abhishek 60'	Report	Mahmood 30'; Shahid 45'; Rana 49'	Stadium: Gifu Prefectural Green Stadium

3 October 2026 Asian Games Gold medal match	India	5–1	Malaysia	Kakamigahara, Japan
15:30	Harmanpreet 11', 57'; Jugraj 23'; Hardik 42'; Lakra 54'	Report	Silverius 14'	Stadium: Gifu Prefectural Green Stadium

27 October 2026 2026 ACT Group Stage	India	13–0	Bangladesh	Jalandhar, India
19:00	Harmanpreet 2', 44'; Mandeep 3', 10', 54'; Lakra 15'; Abhishek 18'; Nilakanta 26'; Dilpreet 43', 44'; Jugraj 46'; Hardik 60', 60'	Report		Stadium: Surjit Hockey Stadium

29 October 2026 2026 ACT Group Stage	India	5–2	China	Jalandhar, India
19:00	Sukhjeet 12', 34'; Harmanpreet 27', 31'; Jugraj 47'	Report	Yang 26'; Chen 36'	Stadium: Surjit Hockey Stadium

30 October 2026 2026 ACT Group Stage	Japan	1–4	India	Jalandhar, India
19:00	Yamada 15'	Report	Abhishek 11', 51'; Harmanpreet 47'; Vishnukant 56'	Stadium: Surjit Hockey Stadium

1 November 2026 2026 ACT Group Stage	Malaysia	2–4	India	Jalandhar, India
19:00	Anuar 25'; Silverius 60'	Report	Harmanpreet 3', 33', 58'; Sukhjeet 43'	Stadium: Surjit Hockey Stadium

2 November 2026 2026 ACT Group Stage	India	8–0	South Korea	Jalandhar, India
19:00	Dilpreet 8', 40'; Jugraj 11'; Harmanpreet 15'; Lakra 33'; Sukhjeet 34'; Sanjay 36'; Angad 60'	Report		Stadium: Surjit Hockey Stadium

4 November 2026 2026 ACT Semi-final	India	8–1	South Korea	Mohali, India
19:00	Lakra 4', 13'; Harmanpreet 9'; Sukhjeet 21'; Dilpreet 21', 25'; Angad 36'; Prasad 54'	Report	Han 9'	Stadium: Mohali International Hockey Stadium

5 November 2026 2026 ACT Gold medal match	India	4–1	Japan	Mohali, India
19:00	Lakra 42'; Dilpreet 48'; Jugraj 53'; Sukhjeet 54'	Report	Matsumoto 3'	Stadium: Olympian Balbir Singh Senior International Hockey Stadium

19 November 2026 Indian Centenary Hockey Series Match 1	New Zealand	2–3	India	Auckland, New Zealand
11:00	Elmes 25'; Hiha 55'	Report	Uttam 25'; Sharda Nand 38'; Sanjay 43'	Stadium: Lloyd Elsmore Park

21 November 2026 Indian Centenary Hockey Series Match 2	New Zealand	2–2	India	Auckland, New Zealand
08:30	Thomas 25'; Hiha 56'	Report	Angad 35'; Sanjay 57'	Stadium: Lloyd Elsmore Park

22 November 2026 Indian Centenary Hockey Series Match 3	New Zealand	2–2	India	Auckland, New Zealand
06:30	Thomas 9'; Culhane 55'	Report	Sanjay 16'; Karthi 18'	Stadium: Lloyd Elsmore Park

== See also ==
- India women's national field hockey team results (2025–2028)
