= Indian Centenary Hockey Series =

Slumberzone Indian Centenary Hockey Series

Tournament details
- Host country: New Zealand
- City: Auckland
- Dates: 19–22 November 2026
- Teams: India; New Zealand (from 2 confederations)
- Venue: Lloyd Elsmore Park

Final positions
- Champions: India

Tournament statistics
- Matches played: 3
- Goals scored: 13 (4.33 per match)
- Top scorer: (India) Sanjay (3 goals)

The Indian Centenary Hockey Series (officially known as Slumberzone Indian Centenary Hockey Series for sponsorship reasons) was an international field hockey series between the men's national teams of India and New Zealand. Organized by the New Zealand Hockey Federation, from 19 to 22 November 2026, the series commemorated 100 years of hockey ties between the two countries. India won the three-match series by 1–0.

== History and Background ==
=== Invitational tournament ===
The hockey ties between India and New Zealand date back to 1926, when an Indian Army hockey team toured New Zealand. Discussions between the New Zealand Hockey Association (NZHA) and the Indian Army Sports Control Board had begun in late 1924. The 17-member touring team comprised four British officers and 13 other members of the Indian Army. New Zealand hockey officials sent £500 to India in April 1926 ahead of the tour, with financial guarantees arranged to cover the risk of the venture.

The first match of the tour took place on 26 June 1926 at Lancaster Park in Christchurch. India recognises the fixture as its first international field hockey match. The touring Indian Army team included Dhyan Chand and other members of the team who won three consecutive Olympic gold medals for the Indian national team in 1928, 1932 and 1936. The Indian team's playing style of precise passing, close ball control and coordinated movement differed from the more physical and hard-hitting approach traditionally associated with New Zealand hockey. The tour drew large crowds, with an estimated 15,000 people attending a match at Wellington's Basin Reserve and more than 25,000 reportedly watching the final Test at Eden Park in Auckland. Across 21 matches, the visitors recorded 18 wins, one defeat and two draws, scoring 192 goals, of which Dhyan Chand scored 80. The three-Test series between both the national teams ended in a 1–1 draw. India won the first match by 5–2 in Christchurch. In the second test match on 10 July, New Zealand won the match by 4–3 and the third test match on 17 July was a 1–1 draw, both in Auckland.

The way the Indian teams handled themselves and definitely the way that they played with such wizardry – it fascinated the crowds and I’m sure the population of New Zealand suddenly thought these [guys] are not a bad team.

— Ramesh Patel, in an interview with the Asia New Zealand Foundation

=== Influence ===
Sports historian Geoff Watson of Massey University noted that the Indian team's emphasis on accurate passing and coordinated play influenced the coaching approaches later developed in New Zealand. Among those associated with this legacy was Cyril Walter, whose players went on to win the Olympic gold in 1976. Wellington Indian Sports Club was established in 1935, followed by clubs in Auckland and Christchurch in 1936 and the New Zealand Indian Sports Association in 1962.

=== Centenary Celebration ===
During the 2026 FIH Nations Cup Final between India and New Zealand in Auckland on 21st June 2026 Michelle Turner, the chief executive of Hockey New Zealand, expressed hope that bilateral series between India and New Zealand men's and women's teams would take place in November. On 14 September 2026, Hockey New Zealand officially announced the schedule. Each match was preceded by curtain-raisers between the Defence Force teams of the two nations. The event also featured Kabaddi game on Saturday at 14:30 (local time).

== Broadcasting and Sponsorship ==
The series was sponsored by Slumberzone, with additional support from Tātaki Auckland Unlimited through Auckland Council Events. The series was broadcast live on TVNZ+ in New Zealand with English and Hindi commentary. Matches were live-streamed on the Hockey New Zealand's platform hockeynz.tv.

== Venue ==
Lloyd Elsmore Park in Pakuranga Heights hosted all the matches.

(New Zealand) Auckland
Lloyd Elsmore Park

== Squads ==
New Zealand (WR 9)	India (WR 8)
Coach: (New Zealand) Shea McAleese: 2. Dean Clarkson; 5. Zander Fraser; 7. Javahn Jones; 8. Richard Joyce (GK); 9. Sam Hiha; 10. Timothy Greenwood; 13. Sam Lints; 16. Aidan Sarikaya; 17. Nic Woods (C); 19. Joseph Morrison; 23. Dylan Thomas; 27. Scott Cosslett; 28. Luke Holmes; 29. Gus Nelson; 33. Jonty Elmes; 35. Ryan Parr; 36. Patrick Ward; 38. Benjamin Culhane; 40. Matthew Ruetsch (GK); 41. Tim Neild	Coach: (South Africa) Craig Fulton: 15. Nilam Sanjeep Xess; 19. Aditya Lalage; 21. Rosan Kujur; 23. Uttam Singh; 25. Ajeet Yadav; 26. Manmeet Singh; 27. Mohith H. S. (GK); 28. Talem Priyobarta; 29. Rabichandra Singh; 35. Anmol Ekka; 37. Angad Bir Singh; 40. Vishnukant Singh; 44. Arshdeep Singh; 45. Venkatesh Kenche; 47. Yashdeep Siwach; 50. Karthi Selvam; 70. Sanjay (C); 71. Pawan Malik (GK); 79. Sharda Nand Tiwari; 90. Araijeet Singh Hundal

== Matches ==
All times are local (UTC+13:00)

Pos	Team	Pld	W	D	L	GF	GA	GD	Pts
1	India	3	1	2	0	7	6	+1	5
2	New Zealand (H)	3	0	2	1	6	7	−1	2

Source: Hockey New Zealand
Rules for classification: 1) points; 2) matches won; 3) goal difference; 4) goals for; 5) head-to-head result; 6) field goals for.
(H) Hosts

=== Match 1 ===
19 November 2026
18:30

New Zealand	2–3	India
Elmes 25'; Hiha 55'	Report	Uttam 25'; Sharda Nand 38'; Sanjay 43'

Lloyd Elsmore Park
Umpires:
Ryan Potter (NZL)
David Tomlinson (NZL)

=== Match 2 ===
21 November 2026
16:00

New Zealand	2–2	India
Thomas 25'; Hiha 56'	Report	Angad 35'; Sanjay 57'

Lloyd Elsmore Park
Umpires:
Tim Bond (NZL)
Lee Erskine (NZL)

=== Match 3 ===
22 November 2026
14:00

New Zealand	2–2	India
Thomas 9'; Culhane 55'	Report	Sanjay 16'; Karthi 18'

Lloyd Elsmore Park
Umpires:
Ryan Potter (NZL)
Lee Erskine (NZL)

=== Winners ===
Indian Centenary Hockey Series

India
title

=== Curtain-raisers ===
19 November 2026
16:00

New Zealand Defence Force Men	1–4	Indian Defence Force Men
	Report

Lloyd Elsmore Park

21 November 2026
11:30

NZ Indians Women	3–1	NZ Defence Force Women
	Report

Lloyd Elsmore Park

21 November 2026
13:30

NZ Indians Men	1–3	Indian Defence Force Men
	Report

Lloyd Elsmore Park

22 November 2026
09:30

NZ Defence Force Women	1–4	NZ Indians Women
	Report

Lloyd Elsmore Park

22 November 2026
11:30

New Zealand Defence Force Men	0–2	Indian Defence Force Men
	Report

Lloyd Elsmore Park

== Goalscorers ==
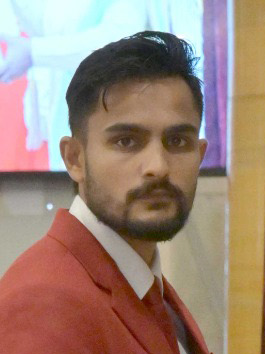
India captain Sanjay scored the most goals in the series, all through penalty corners.

There were 13 goals scored in 3 matches, for an average of 4.33 goals per match.

3 goals

- (India) Sanjay

2 goals

- (New Zealand) Sam Hiha
- (New Zealand) Dylan Thomas

1 goal

- (India) Karthi Selvam
- (India) Angad Bir Singh
- (India) Uttam Singh
- (India) Sharda Nand Tiwari
- (New Zealand) Benji Culhane
- (New Zealand) Jonty Elmes
