= 2023 Sultan of Johor Cup =

Men's U21 field hockey tournament in Malaysia

Tournament details
- Host country: Malaysia
- City: Johor Bahru
- Dates: 27 October – 4 November
- Teams: 8 (from 4 confederations)
- Venue: Taman Daya Hockey Stadium

Final positions
- Champions: Germany (2nd title)
- Runner-up: Australia
- Third place: India

Tournament statistics
- Matches played: 20
- Goals scored: 107 (5.35 per match)
- Top scorer: (India) Amandeep Lakra (6 goals)
- Best player: (Germany) Matteo Poljaric
- Best goalkeeper: (Germany) Joshua Onyekwue

The 2023 Sultan of Johor Cup was the eleventh edition of the Sultan of Johor Cup, an international men's under–21 field hockey tournament in Malaysia. It was held at the Taman Daya Hockey Stadium in Johor Bahru, Malaysia from 27 October to 4 November 2023.

Germany won their second title by defeating Australia 3–1 in a shoot-out after the match finished 0–0. The defending champions India won the bronze medal by defeating Pakistan 6–5 in a shoot-out after the match finished 3–3.

== Participating nations ==
Including the host nation, 8 teams competed in the tournament.

Country	FIH Junior Ranking	Previous Best Appearance	Best FIH Junior World Cup Finish
Australia	9	Champions (2016, 2017)	Champions (1997)
India	3	Champions (2013, 2014, 2022)	Champions (2001, 2016)
Germany	2	Champions (2012)	Champions (1982, 1985, 1989, 1993, 2009, 2013)
Great Britain*	15	Champions (2015, 2018, 2019)	Fourth Place (1997, 2001)
Malaysia	8	Champions (2011)	Fourth Place (1979, 1982, 2013)
New Zealand	13	Fourth Place (2014)	Fourth Place (2009)
Pakistan	12	Runners-Up (2016)	Champions (1979)
South Africa	10	Fifth Place (2022)	Ninth Place (2021)

* = includes results representing England, Scotland and Wales

== Squads ==
Australia
1. Nye Roberts
2. William Mathison
6. Liam Henderson
7. Lachlan Rogers
9. Diarmid Chappell
11. Max Freedman
12. Angus Adamson
13. Dylan Downey
16. Nathan Czinner
17. Hamish Adamson
18. Noah Fahy
19. Craig Marais (C)
21. Cooper Burns
23. Cambell Geddes
24. Brodee Foster
25. Michael Taylor
26. Hunter Banyard (GK)
28. Max Larkin (GK)
Germany
3. Ben Hasbach
4. Christian Franz
8. Jan Cordes
10. Luis Höchemer (C)
11. Hugo von Montgelas
12. Tom Schmidt-Didlaukies
14. Peer Hinrichs
15. Niklas Berendts
16. Antheus Barry (C)
20. Florian Sperling
21. Matteo Poljaric (C)
23. Jakob Brilla
24. Liam Holdermann
25. Michel Struthoff
26. Aron Flatten
27. Paul Glander
29. Joshua Onyekwue-Nnaji (GK)
35. Florian Simon (GK)
43. Leon Lindemann
Great Britain
2. Thomas Spreckley
3. Monty Neave
4. Nicholas Nurse
5. Rory Penrose
6. Ted Graves
7. Tom Moorhouse
8. Jacob Payton
9. Jonny Sturch-Hibbitt
10. Max Anderson (C)
11. Lewis Wilcher
13. Henry Markham
14. Harrison Stone
15. Felix Tully
17. Matthew Hughson
19. Alistair Douglas
20. Ellis Robson
21. Patrick Rose
22. James Taylor
23. Calum Douglas (GK)
26. James Carleton (GK)
India
2. Yogember Rawat
3. Sunit Lakra
4. Amandeep Lakra
5. Poovanna Chandura Boby
6. Amir Ali
7. Arun Sahani
8. Angad Bir Singh
9. Amandeep
13. Ranvijay Singh Yadav (GK)
14. Vishnukant Singh
16. Uttam Singh (C)
17. Ahad Abdul
20. Sunil Jojo
22. Gurjot Singh
27. Mohith H. S. (GK)
30. Aditya Lalage
32. Rohit Mohil
39. Sathish Balu
50. Sukhvinder
78. Rajinder Singh
Malaysia
New Zealand
1. Ryan Parr
3. Matthew Wilson
4. Dylan Muggleston
5. James Hickson
6. Aidan Fraser
7. Joshua Irwin
8. Scott Cosslett
9. Patrick Ward
11. Daniel Torr
12. Benjamin Culhane (C)
13. Samuel Lints
14. Luke Aldred
16. Jordan Whittleston
17. Luke Elmes (GK)
18. Hayden Ganley (GK)
19. Jonty Elmes
20. Aiden Bax
21. Gus Nelson
Pakistan
1. Ali Raza (GK)
2. Arbaz Ahmad
3. Sufyan Khan
4. Ahtisham Aslam
5. Murtaza Yaqoob
6. Arbaz Ayaz
7. Hannan Shahid (C)
8. Arshad Liaqat
9. Abdul Rehman
10. Zikriya Hayat
11. Ghazanfar Ali
12. Abdul Sajid (GK)
13. Basharat Ali
15. Rana Ashraf
16. Abdul Wahab
17. Abdul Qayyam
18. Muhammad Ammad
19. Arsalan
21. Abuzar
South Africa
1. Devan van Niekerk (GK)
3. Viwe Mbata
4. Nathan Ansell (C)
5. James Flint
6. Daniel Neuhoff
7. Hans Neethling
9. Cameron le Forestier
10. Ross Breytenbach
11. Damian Knott
13. Josh de Klerk
14. Caleb Oliphant
15. Jamie Seale
16. Thabang Jeyi
17. Ayakha Mthalane
21. Fawaaz Kahder
27. Gianluca Virissimo (GK)
29. Ross Montgomery
31. David Tshebi

== Preliminary round ==
All times are local (UTC+8).

=== Pool A ===
Pos	Team	Pld	W	D	L	GF	GA	GD	Pts	Qualification
1	Australia	3	2	1	0	9	2	+7	7	Semi-finals
2	Germany	3	2	1	0	12	6	+6	7	Semi-finals
3	Great Britain	3	1	0	2	5	8	−3	3	
4	South Africa	3	0	0	3	2	12	−10	0	

Source: FIH
Rules for classification: 1) points; 2) matches won; 3) goal difference; 4) goals for; 5) head-to-head result; 6) field goals for.

27 October 2023
18:05

Australia	3–0	Great Britain
Foster 14', 18'; Chappell 35'	Report

Umpires:
Khalid Hussain (HKG)
Mohit (IND)

28 October 2023
16:05

Germany	6–1	South Africa
Holdermann 18'; Poljaric 21'; Hoechemer 31'; Sperling 37'; Hasbach 38', 54'	Report	Oliphant 58'

Umpires:
Timothy Sheahan (AUS)
Mohd Ismady Alib (MAS)

30 October 2023
16:05

South Africa	1–2	Great Britain
De Klerk 54'	Report	Sturch-Hibbitt 43'; Penrose 58'

Umpires:
Mohd Ismady Alib (MAS)
Khalid Hussain (HKG)

30 October 2023
18:05

Australia	2–2	Germany
Downey 10'; Burns 11'	Report	Glander 51'; Hoechemer 59'

Umpires:
Mohit (IND)
Kevin Roberts (WAL)

31 October 2023
16:05

Germany	4–3	Great Britain
Brilla 20'; Glander 33'; Struthoff 52'; Sperling 56'	Report	Sturch-Hibbitt 4'; Moorhouse 50'; Markham 52'

Umpires:
Bevan Nichol (NZL)
Kugannan Segaran (MAS)

31 October 2023
18:05

South Africa	0–4	Australia
	Report	Burns 15', 51'; Mathison 24'; Downey 41'

Umpires:
Fahad Ali Khan (PAK)
Ole Ingwersen (GER)

=== Pool B ===
Pos	Team	Pld	W	D	L	GF	GA	GD	Pts	Qualification
1	India	3	2	1	0	12	6	+6	7	Semi-finals
2	Pakistan	3	2	1	0	9	7	+2	7	Semi-finals
3	New Zealand	3	1	0	2	7	11	−4	3	
4	Malaysia (H)	3	0	0	3	5	9	−4	0	

Source: FIH
Rules for classification: 1) points; 2) matches won; 3) goal difference; 4) goals for; 5) head-to-head result; 6) field goals for.
(H) Hosts

27 October 2023
16:05

India	3–3	Pakistan
Amandeep L. 30'; Aditya 56'; Uttam 59'	Report	Ahmad 31', 58'; Shahid 49'

Umpires:
Bevan Nichol (NZL)
Kevin Roberts (WAL)

27 October 2023
20:35

Malaysia	2–3	New Zealand
Faris 7', 24'	Report	Aldred 6'; Cosslett 15'; Hickson 33'

Umpires:
Ole Ingwersen (GER)
Shahbaz Ali (BAN)

28 October 2023
18:05

Pakistan	3–2	New Zealand
Ahmad 7'; B. Ali 30'; Khan 47'	Report	Nelson 58'; Ward 59'

Umpires:
Kugannan Segaran (MAS)
Chad Fourie (RSA)

28 October 2023
20:35

Malaysia	1–3	India
Shahmie Irfan 13'	Report	Aditya 28'; Amandeep L. 37'; Rohit 54'

Umpires:
Bevan Nichol (NZL)
Fahad Ali Khan (PAK)

30 October 2023
20:35

India	6–2	New Zealand
Amandeep L. 2', 7', 35'; Arun 12', 53'; Poovanna 52'	Report	Aldred 29', 60'

Umpires:
Timothy Sheahan (AUS)
Ole Ingwersen (GER)

31 October 2023
20:35

Pakistan	3–2	Malaysia
Abuzar 13'; Ahmad 21'; Khan 24'	Report	Shahmie Irfan 47'; Shafiq Ikhmal 51'

Umpires:
Chad Fourie (RSA)
Shahbaz Ali (BAN)

== Fifth to eighth place classification ==
=== Bracket ===
Cross-overs
2 November
New Zealand	3
South Africa	1
2 November
Great Britain	7
Malaysia	4

Fifth place
4 November
New Zealand	3
Great Britain	5
Seventh place
3 November
South Africa	2
Malaysia	3

=== Cross-overs ===
2 November 2023
18:05

New Zealand	3–1	South Africa
J. Elmes 15'; Lints 36'; Nelson 47'	Report	Mbata 14'

Umpires:
Kevin Roberts (WAL)
Kugannan Segaran (MAS)

2 November 2023
20:35

Great Britain	7–4	Malaysia
Hughson 5'; Graves 9'; Douglas 15'; Payton 36', 42'; Markham 49'; Penrose 54'	Report	Faris 22', 44'; Andywalfian 24'; Harris 27'

Umpires:
Khalid Hussain (HKG)
Timothy Sheahan (AUS)

=== Seventh and eighth place ===
3 November 2023
15:35

South Africa	2–3	Malaysia
Mbata 10'; Le Forestier 49'	Report	Nur Aqilrullah 12'; Harris 39'; Mughni 56'

Umpires:
Shahbaz Ali (BAN)
Fahad Ali Khan (PAK)

=== Fifth and sixth place ===
4 November 2023
15:35

New Zealand	3–5	Great Britain
Whittleston 2'; Lints 58'; J. Elmes 58'	Report	Markham 3', 54'; Sturch-Hibbitt 23'; Stone 33'; Tully 37'

Umpires:
Ole Ingwersen (GER)
Mohd Ismady Alib (MAS)

== First to fourth place classification ==
=== Bracket ===
Semi-finals
3 November
India	3
Germany	6
3 November
Australia	2
Pakistan	1

Final
4 November
Germany (p.s.o.)	0 (3)
Australia	0 (1)
Third place
4 November
India (p.s.o.)	3 (6)
Pakistan	3 (5)

=== Semi-finals ===
3 November 2023
16:05

India	3–6	Germany
Amandeep L. 35'; Uttam 58'; Rohit 60'	Report	Franz 16'; Berendts 29', 45'; Hinrichs 43', 48'; Sperling 49'

Umpires:
Timothy Sheahan (AUS)
Kevin Roberts (WAL)

3 November 2023
20:35

Australia	2–1	Pakistan
Burns 18'; Foster 29'	Report	Shahid 59'

Umpires:
Mohit (IND)
Ole Ingwersen (GER)

=== Third and fourth place ===
4 November 2023
16:05

India	3–3	Pakistan
Arun 11'; Poovanna 42'; Uttam 52'	Report	Khan 33'; Qayyum 50'; Shahid 57'
Penalties
Vishnukant (penalty shoot-out scored); Rajinder (penalty shoot-out scored); Angad (penalty shoot-out scored); Uttam (penalty shoot-out scored); Amandeep (penalty shoot-out missed); Vishnukant (penalty shoot-out scored); Angad (penalty shoot-out scored)	6–5	(penalty shoot-out scored) Liaqat; (penalty shoot-out scored) Shahid; (penalty shoot-out scored) Rehman; (penalty shoot-out scored) Aslam; (penalty shoot-out missed) Yaqoob; (penalty shoot-out scored) Liaqat; (penalty shoot-out missed) Shahid

Umpires:
Timothy Sheahan (AUS)
Kugannan Segaran (MAS)

=== Final ===
4 November 2023
20:35

Germany	0–0	Australia
	Report
Penalties
Sperling (penalty shoot-out scored); Struthoff (penalty shoot-out scored); Von Montgelas (penalty shoot-out missed); Poljaric (penalty shoot-out scored)	3–1	(penalty shoot-out missed) Burns; (penalty shoot-out scored) Marais; (penalty shoot-out missed) Henderson; (penalty shoot-out missed) Czinner

Umpires:
Bevan Nichol (NZL)
Chad Fourie (RSA)

== Statistics ==
=== Final standings ===
Pos	Team
1	Germany
2	Australia
3	India
4	Pakistan
5	Great Britain
6	New Zealand
7	Malaysia (H)
8	South Africa

Source: FIH
(H) Host

=== Goalscorers ===
There were 107 goals scored in 20 matches, for an average of 5.35 goals per match.

6 goals

- (India) Amandeep Lakra

4 goals

- (Australia) Cooper Burns
- (United Kingdom) Henry Markham
- (Malaysia) Faris Harizan
- (Pakistan) Arbaz Ahmad

3 goals

- (Australia) Brodee Foster
- (Germany) Florian Sperling
- (United Kingdom) Jonny Sturch-Hibbitt
- (India) Arun Sahani
- (India) Uttam Singh
- (New Zealand) Luke Aldred
- (Pakistan) Sufyan Khan
- (Pakistan) Hannan Shahid

2 goals

- (Australia) Dylan Downey
- (Germany) Nikas Berendts
- (Germany) Paul Glander
- (Germany) Ben Hasbach
- (Germany) Peer Hinrichs
- (Germany) Luis Hoechemer
- (United Kingdom) Jacob Payton
- (United Kingdom) Rory Penrose
- (India) Poovanna BC
- (India) Aditya Lalage
- (India) Rohit
- (Malaysia) Harris Osman
- (Malaysia) Shahmie Irfan Suhaimi
- (New Zealand) Jonty Elmes
- (New Zealand) Sam Lints
- (New Zealand) Gus Nelson
- (South Africa) Viwe Mbata

1 goal

- (Australia) Diarmid Chappell
- (Australia) Will Mathison
- (Germany) Jakob Brilla
- (Germany) Christian Franz
- (Germany) Liam Holdermann
- (Germany) Matteo Poljaric
- (Germany) Michel Struthoff
- (United Kingdom) Ali Douglas
- (United Kingdom) Ted Graves
- (United Kingdom) Matthew Hughson
- (United Kingdom) Tom Moorhouse
- (United Kingdom) Harrison Stone
- (United Kingdom) Felix Tully
- (Malaysia) Nur Aqilrullah Che
- (Malaysia) Andywalfian Jeffrynus
- (Malaysia) Mughni Kamal
- (Malaysia) Shafiq Ikhmal Daniel
- (New Zealand) Scott Cosslett
- (New Zealand) James Hickson
- (New Zealand) Patrick Ward
- (New Zealand) Jordan Whittleston
- (Pakistan) Abuzar
- (Pakistan) Basharat Ali
- (Pakistan) Abdul Qayyum
- (South Africa) Josh de Klerk
- (South Africa) Cameron Le Forestier
- (South Africa) Caleb Oliphant

Source: FIH
