= India men's national field hockey team results =

This article provides an index of the results of the India men's national field hockey team, with matches divided into period-specific articles. These pages include all the official competitions and unofficial matches that were sanctioned by the Hockey India and International Hockey Federation (FIH). The results of the India men's national field hockey team are divided into period-specific articles, generally corresponding to Olympic cycles. The first article covers the team's matches from 1926 to 1928, following India's first recorded international tournament in 1926.

- India men's national field hockey team results (1926–1928)
- India men's national field hockey team results (1929–1932)
- India men's national field hockey team results (1933–1936)
- India men's national field hockey team results (1937–1940)
- India men's national field hockey team results (1941–1944)
- India men's national field hockey team results (1945–1948)
- India men's national field hockey team results (1949–1952)
- India men's national field hockey team results (1953–1956)
- India men's national field hockey team results (1957–1960)
- India men's national field hockey team results (1961–1964)
- India men's national field hockey team results (1965–1968)
- India men's national field hockey team results (1969–1972)
- India men's national field hockey team results (1973–1976)
- India men's national field hockey team results (1977–1980)
- India men's national field hockey team results (1981–1984)
- India men's national field hockey team results (1985–1988)
- India men's national field hockey team results (1989–1992)
- India men's national field hockey team results (1993–1996)
- India men's national field hockey team results (1997–2000)
- India men's national field hockey team results (2001–2004)
- India men's national field hockey team results (2005–2008)
- India men's national field hockey team results (2009–2012)
- India men's national field hockey team results (2013–2016)
- India men's national field hockey team results (2017–2020)
- India men's national field hockey team results (2021–2024)
- India men's national field hockey team results (2025–2028)

== See also ==
- India women's national field hockey team results
