= 2023 Men's Hockey Junior Asia Cup =

Tournament details
- Host country: Oman
- City: Salalah
- Dates: 23 May – 1 June
- Teams: 10 (from 1 confederation)
- Venue: Salalah Sports Complex

Final positions
- Champions: India (4th title)
- Runner-up: Pakistan
- Third place: South Korea

Tournament statistics
- Matches played: 29
- Goals scored: 198 (6.83 per match)
- Top scorer(s): (Japan) Kumpei Yasuda (Pakistan) Abdul Rehman (9 goals)
- Best player: (Pakistan) Hannan Shahid
- Best goalkeeper: (India) Mohith H.S.

The 2023 Men's Hockey Junior Asia Cup was the ninth edition of the Men's Hockey Junior Asia Cup, the men's international under-21 field hockey championship of Asia organized by the Asian Hockey Federation. It took place from 23 May to 1 June 2023 at the Salalah Sports Complex in Salalah, Oman.

The tournament served as the Asian qualifier for the 2023 FIH Junior World Cup, with the top three qualifying. The defending champions India won their fourth title by defeating Pakistan 2–1 in the final. South Korea won the bronze medal by defeating Malaysia 2–1.

== Qualification ==
Dates	Event	Location	Quotas	Qualifiers
—N/a	FIH Men's World Ranking	—N/a	5	India; Japan; Malaysia; Pakistan; South Korea
6–12 January 2023	2023 Junior AHF Cup	Muscat, Oman	5	Bangladesh; Chinese Taipei; Oman; Thailand; Uzbekistan
Total			10	

== Preliminary round ==
=== Pool A ===
Pos	Team	Pld	W	D	L	GF	GA	GD	Pts	Qualification
1	India	4	3	1	0	39	2	+37	10	Semi-finals
2	Pakistan	4	3	1	0	28	4	+24	10	Semi-finals
3	Japan	4	2	0	2	20	8	+12	6	
4	Thailand	4	1	0	3	5	35	−30	3	
5	Chinese Taipei	4	0	0	4	4	47	−43	0	

Source: FIH
Rules for classification: 1) points; 2) matches won; 3) goal difference; 4) goals for; 5) head-to-head result; 6) field goals for.

23 May 2023
09:00

Japan	7–1	Thailand
I. Saeki 8'; Tanaka 10', 19', 20'; Yasuda 21', 42'; K. Saeki 25'	Report	Phumee 44'

Umpires:
Hashim Al Shatri (OMA)
James Unkles (AUS)

23 May 2023
15:30

Pakistan	15–1	Chinese Taipei
Khan 2', 18', 42'; Ahmad 7', 39'; Akram 26'; Qayyum 30'; Rehman 35'; Ali 40'; Shahid 44', 46', 59'; Hayat 45'; Liaqat 48'; Murtaza 50'	Report	Lin 49'

Umpires:
You Hyosik (KOR)
Muhammad Amirul Rashid (MAS)

24 May 2023
17:45

India	18–0	Chinese Taipei
Uttam 10', 59'; Boby Singh Dhami 10', 46'; Sharda Nand 11'; Araijeet 19', 19', 30', 59'; Angad 37'; Aditya 37', 37'; Amandeep 38', 39', 41'; Amir 51'; Poovanna 54'; Rawat 60'	Report

Umpires:
Hussain Al Hasani (OMA)
Kenta Uziie (JPN)

24 May 2023
20:00

Pakistan	9–0	Thailand
Shahid 15'; Rehman 19', 41', 46', 48', 48'; Wahab 30'; Ahmad 53'; Murtaza 54'	Report

Umpires:
Makhmud Kholmatov (UZB)
Rashed Hasan Rony (BAN)

25 May 2023
17:45

Japan	1–3	India
Yasuda 19'	Report	Araijeet 36'; Sharda Nand 39'; Uttam 56'

Umpires:
Maarten Boxma (NED)
You Hyosik (KOR)

26 May 2023
17:45

Thailand	4–2	Chinese Taipei
Chueamkaew 11'; Phokphun 16'; Phumee 29', 48'	Report	Wei 4'; Chen 33'

Umpires:
Kenta Uziie (JPN)
Hashim Al Shatri (OMA)

27 May 2023
15:30

Chinese Taipei	1–10	Japan
Yueh 38'	Report	I. Saeki 3', 41'; Yasuda 16', 29'; Tanaka 29'; K. Saeki 36', 37', 44', 45'; Saito 40'

Umpires:
Hussain Al Hasani (OMA)
Makhmud Kholmatov (UZB)

27 May 2023
20:00

Pakistan	1–1	India
Ali 44'	Report	Sharda Nand 24'

Umpires:
James Unkles (AUS)
You Hyosik (KOR)

28 May 2023
20:00

India	17–0	Thailand
Angad 13', 33', 47', 55'; Rawat 17'; Uttam 24', 31'; Amandeep L. 26', 29'; Araijeet 36'; Vishnukant 38'; Boby Singh Dhami 45'; Sharda Nand 46'; Amandeep 47'; Rohit 49'; Sunit 54'; Rajinder 56'	Report

Umpires:
Rashed Hasan Rony (BAN)
Makhmud Kholmatov (UZB)

29 May 2023
17:45

Japan	2–3	Pakistan
Yasuda 2'; Yamada 38'	Report	Ahmad 23'; Wahab 30', 39'

Umpires:
James Unkles (AUS)
Muhammad Amirul Rashid (MAS)

=== Pool B ===
Pos	Team	Pld	W	D	L	GF	GA	GD	Pts	Qualification
1	Malaysia	4	4	0	0	17	3	+14	12	Semi-finals
2	South Korea	4	3	0	1	18	6	+12	9	Semi-finals
3	Bangladesh	4	2	0	2	7	9	−2	6	
4	Oman (H)	4	1	0	3	1	11	−10	3	
5	Uzbekistan	4	0	0	4	8	22	−14	0	

Source: FIH
Rules for classification: 1) points; 2) matches won; 3) goal difference; 4) goals for; 5) head-to-head result; 6) field goals for.
(H) Hosts

23 May 2023
17:45

Malaysia	8–1	Uzbekistan
Perabu 7', 9', 18'; Alfarico 12'; Shahmie Irfan 26'; Nur Aqilrullah 27'; Mughni 43'; Adam 52'	Report	Kakhramonov 55'

Umpires:
Deekshith Narayana (IND)
Rashed Hasan Rony (BAN)

23 May 2023
20:00

Oman	0–2	Bangladesh
	Report	Ali 22'; Hossain 24'

Umpires:
Maarten Boxma (NED)
Hafiz Atif Latif (PAK)

24 May 2023
15:30

South Korea	6–1	Uzbekistan
Kim M. 3', 35'; Lee Se. 18'; Lee Su. 44'; Park G. 56'; Hwang 60'	Report	Kakhramonov 50'

Umpires:
Phiraphat Niensupornphand (THA)
Huang Yu-Cheng (TPE)

25 May 2023
15:30

Malaysia	5–1	Bangladesh
Shafiq Ikhmal 8'; Shahmie Irfan 13', 43', 59'; Syamim 14'	Report	Abdullah 37'

Umpires:
Hussain Al Hasani (OMA)
Deekshith Narayana (IND)

25 May 2023
20:00

Oman	1–8	South Korea
Madit 46'	Report	Kim M. 21'; Park H. 23'; Park G. 24'; Lim 26', 38', 42', 56'; Choi 46'

Umpires:
James Unkles (AUS)
Muhammad Amirul Rashid (MAS)

26 May 2023
20:00

Bangladesh	3–1	Uzbekistan
Islam 15', 22'; Uddin 34'	Report	Husanov 51'

Umpires:
Phiraphat Niensupornphand (THA)
Huang Yu-Cheng (TPE)

27 May 2023
09:00

Malaysia	3–1	South Korea
Perabu 11'; Shahmie Irfan 54'; Mughni 57'	Report	Park G. 56'

Umpires:
Hafiz Atif Latif (PAK)
Maarten Boxma (NED)

27 May 2023
17:45

Uzbekistan	2–3	Oman
Komilov 25'; Salimjonov 51'	Report	Al-Noufali 10'; Al Fazari 13'; Akaak 57'

Umpires:
Muhammad Amirul Rashid (MAS)
Deekshith Narayana (IND)

28 May 2023
17:45

South Korea	3–1	Bangladesh
Lim 11'; Park G. 36'; Kim M. 54'	Report	Hasan 58'

Umpires:
Hafiz Atif Latif (PAK)
Deekshith Narayana (IND)

29 May 2023
20:00

Oman	0–1	Malaysia
	Report	Shahmie Irfan 48'

Umpires:
Huang Yu-Cheng (TPE)
Kenta Uziie (JPN)

== Classification round ==
=== Ninth and tenth place ===
31 May 2023
15:00

Chinese Taipei	1–4	Uzbekistan
Lee 26'	Report	Komilov 20'; Salimjonov 44'; Madaminov 47'; Vakhobjonov 60'

Umpires:
Kenta Uziie (JPN)
Hashim Al Shatri (OMA)

=== Bracket ===
5–8th place semi-finals
30 May
Japan	8
Oman	0
30 May
Bangladesh	4
Thailand	1

Fifth place
1 June
Japan	5
Bangladesh	1
Seventh place
1 June
Oman	2
Thailand	1

==== 5–8th place semi-finals ====
30 May 2023
17:30

Japan	8–0	Oman
Yasuda 19', 34', 58'; Yamasaki 21'; Saito 25'; I. Saeki 27'; Tanaka 44'; Higuchi 44'	Report

Umpires:
Huang Yu-Cheng (TPE)
Phiraphat Niensupornphand (THA)

30 May 2023
20:00

Bangladesh	4–1	Thailand
Ali 1'; Islam 10'; Hasan 18'; Hossain 57'	Report	Phumee 17'

Umpires:
Hussain Al Hasani (OMA)
Hashim Al Shatri (OMA)

==== Seventh and eighth place ====
1 June 2023
09:00

Oman	2–1	Thailand
Al Balushi 25'; Bait 54'	Report	Phumee 40'

Umpires:
Deekshith Narayana (IND)
Rashed Hasan Rony (BAN)

==== Fifth and sixth place ====
1 June 2023
15:00

Japan	5–1	Bangladesh
Tanaka 6', 12'; Shigeyama 8'; I. Saeki 26'; Matsuzaki 55'	Report	Ali 47'

Umpires:
Muhammad Amirul Rashid (MAS)
Phiraphat Niensupornphand (THA)

== First to fourth place classification ==
=== Bracket ===
Semi-finals
31 May
India	9
South Korea	1
31 May
Malaysia	2
Pakistan	6

Final
1 June
India	2
Pakistan	1
Third place
1 June
South Korea	2
Malaysia	1

=== Semi-finals ===
31 May 2023
17:30

India	9–1	South Korea
Sunit 13'; Araijeet 19'; Boby Singh Dhami 31', 39', 55'; Angad 34'; Uttam 38'; Vishnukant 51'; Sharda Nand 57'	Report	Hwang 46'

Umpires:
James Unkles (AUS)
Hafiz Atif Latif (PAK)

31 May 2023
20:00

Malaysia	2–6	Pakistan
Perabu 21'; Danish 45'	Report	Khan 42'; Rehman 44', 48', 51'; Shahid 47'; Ahmad 58'

Umpires:
Maarten Boxma (NED)
You Hyosik (KOR)

=== Third and fourth place ===
1 June 2023
17:30

South Korea	2–1	Malaysia
Lim 22'; Yoo 37'	Report	Adam 26'

Umpires:
Hafiz Atif Latif (PAK)
Maarten Boxma (NED)

=== Final ===
1 June 2023
20:00

India	2–1	Pakistan
Angad 13'; Araijeet 20'	Report	Ali 38'

Umpires:
You Hyo-sik (KOR)
James Unkles (AUS)

== Statistics ==
=== Final standings ===
Pos	Team	Qualification
1st place, gold medalist(s)	India	2023 Junior World Cup
2nd place, silver medalist(s)	Pakistan	2023 Junior World Cup
3rd place, bronze medalist(s)	South Korea	2023 Junior World Cup
4	Malaysia	2023 Junior World Cup
5	Japan	
6	Bangladesh	
7	Oman (H)	
8	Thailand	
9	Uzbekistan	
10	Chinese Taipei	

Source: FIH
(H) Host

=== End of Tournament awards ===
Award	Player/Team
Top Goalscorer	(Pakistan) Abdul Rehman
Player of the Tournament	(Pakistan) Hannan Shahid
Goalkeeper of the Tournament	(India) Mohith H.S.
Rising Player of the Tournament	(Pakistan) Ahtisham Aslam

=== Goalscorers ===
There were 198 goals scored in 29 matches, for an average of 6.83 goals per match.

9 goals

- (Japan) Kumpei Yasuda
- (Pakistan) Abdul Rehman

8 goals

- (India) Araijeet Singh Hundal

7 goals

- (India) Angad Bir Singh
- (Japan) Tsubasa Tanaka

6 goals

- (India) Boby Singh Dhami
- (India) Uttam Singh
- (Malaysia) Shahmie Irfan Suhaimi
- (South Korea) Lim Do-hyun

5 goals

- (India) Sharda Nand Tiwari
- (Japan) Ikumi Saeki
- (Japan) Kodai Saeki
- (Malaysia) Perabu Tangaraja
- (Pakistan) Arbaz Ahmad
- (Pakistan) Hannan Shahid
- (Thailand) Kritsana Phumee

4 goals

- (India) Amandeep
- (Pakistan) Mohammad Khan
- (South Korea) Kim Min-kwon
- (South Korea) Park Geon-woo

3 goals

- (Bangladesh) Muhammad Ali
- (Bangladesh) Amirul Islam
- (Pakistan) Basharat Ali
- (Pakistan) Abdul Wahab

2 goals

- (Bangladesh) Muhammad Hasan
- (India) Poovanna BC
- (India) Amandeep Lakra
- (India) Sunit Lakra
- (India) Rawat Yogember
- (India) Vishnukant Singh
- (Japan) Hiro Saito
- (Malaysia) Adam Ashraf
- (Malaysia) Mughni Kamal
- (Pakistan) Muhammad Murtaza
- (South Korea) Hwang Keonyeol
- (Uzbekistan) Shavkatjon Kakhramonov
- (Uzbekistan) Jamshidbek Komilov
- (Uzbekistan) Shokhrukhbek Salimjonov

1 goal

- (Bangladesh) Muhammad Abdullah
- (Bangladesh) Muhammad Hossain
- (Bangladesh) Muhammad Uddin
- (Chinese Taipei) Chen Yung-Sheng
- (Chinese Taipei) Lee Chi-Hsuan
- (Chinese Taipei) Lin Te-Ju
- (Chinese Taipei) Wei Cheng-Ze
- (Chinese Taipei) Yueh Chin-Cheng
- (India) Amir Ali
- (India) Aditya Lalage
- (India) Rajinder Singh
- (India) Rohit
- (Japan) Yuto Higuchi
- (Japan) Yuito Matsuzaki
- (Japan) Taiga Shigeyama
- (Japan) Hyota Yamada
- (Japan) Ryoga Yamasaki
- (Malaysia) Nur Aqilrullah Che
- (Malaysia) Alfarico Liau
- (Malaysia) Danish Muhammad
- (Malaysia) Shafiq Ikhmal Daniel
- (Malaysia) Syamim Naim
- (Oman) Hahman Akaak
- (Oman) Hudhaifa Al Balushi
- (Oman) Azed Al Fazari
- (Oman) Alkhoder Al-Noufali
- (Oman) Hussam Bait
- (Oman) Aiman Madit
- (Pakistan) Bilal Akram
- (Pakistan) Zikriya Hayat
- (Pakistan) Arshad Liaqat
- (Pakistan) Abdul Qayyum
- (South Korea) Choi Ji-ho
- (South Korea) Lee Seung-hwan
- (South Korea) Lee Sung-min
- (South Korea) Park Hyun
- (South Korea) Yoo Seung-ho
- (Thailand) Kritsada Chueamkaew
- (Thailand) Udomchok Phokphun
- (Uzbekistan) Fozilbek Husanov
- (Uzbekistan) Abdusalom Madaminov
- (Uzbekistan) Mukhammadkodir Vakhobjonov

Source: FIH

== See also ==
- 2023 Women's Hockey Junior Asia Cup
