= Howick Historical Village =

Museum in Auckland, New Zealand

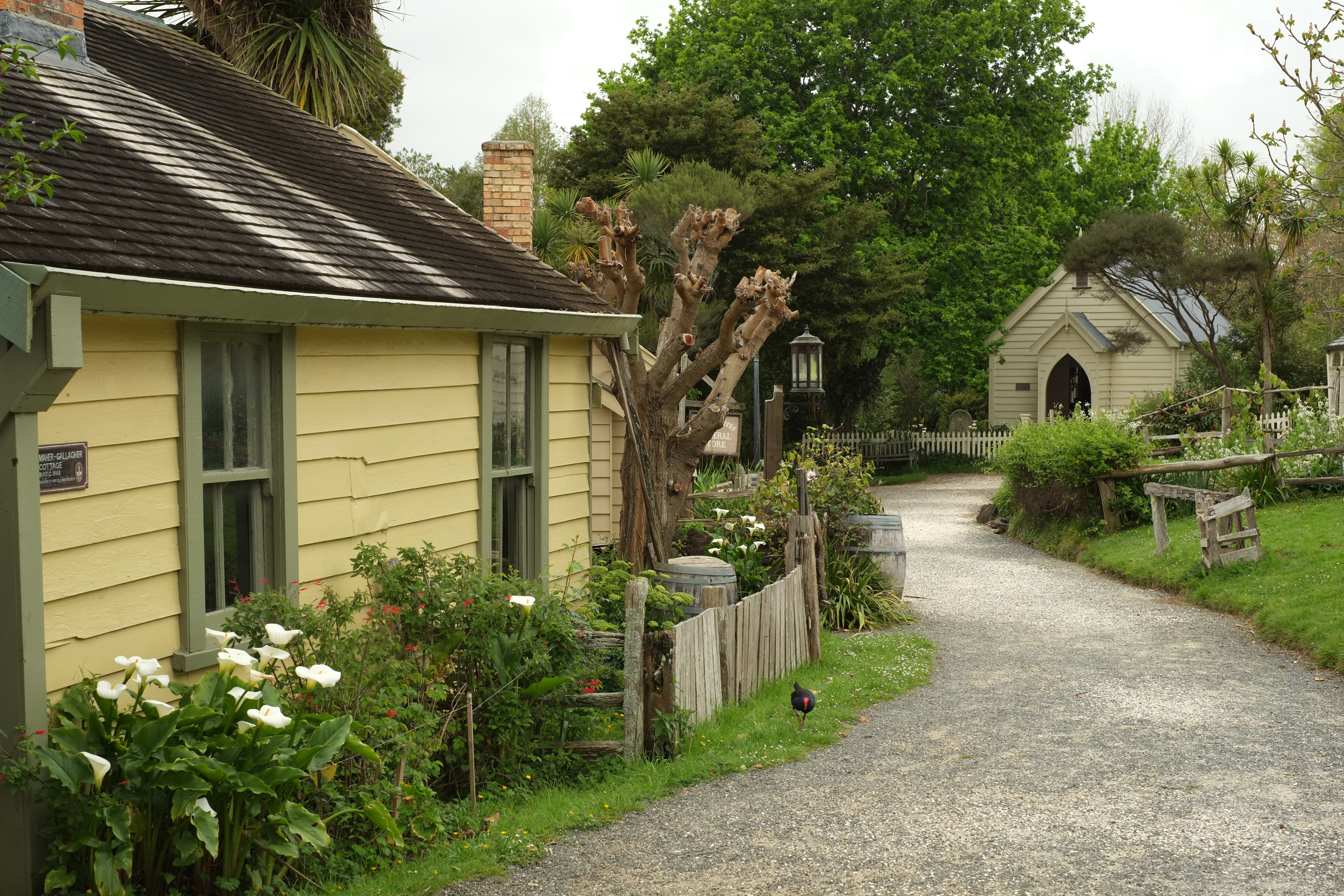
- Maher-Gallagher Cottage (left) and the Howick Wesleyan-Methodist Church
- Former name: Howick Colonial Village
- Established: 8 March 1980; 46 years ago
- Location: Lloyd Elsmore Park, Pakuranga, Auckland, New Zealand
- Coordinates: 36.9074°S 174.9027°E
- Type: Open-air museum, living museum, local museum
- Website: historicalvillage.org.nz

Howick Historical Village is a living museum in Lloyd Elsmore Park, Pakuranga, Auckland, New Zealand. It is a recreation of a New Zealand colonial village between the years 1840 and 1880, focusing on the history of the Royal New Zealand Fencible Corps, and the local European and Māori history of Howick and Pakuranga and the surrounding areas of East Auckland.

Established in 1980 by the Howick & Districts Historical Society, the village has grown to include over 33 historic buildings, including three which are listed on the Heritage New Zealand historic place register.

== Location and scope ==
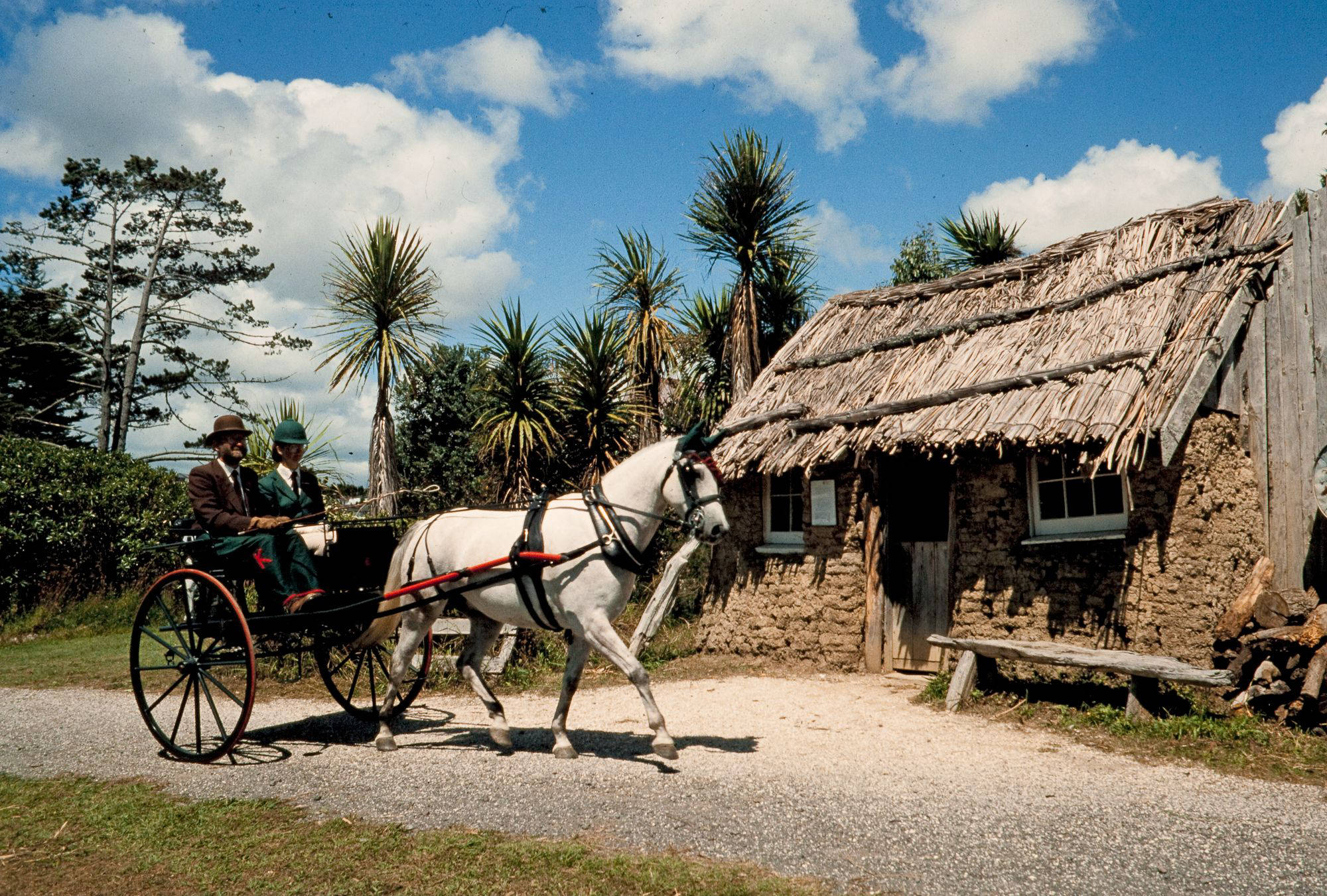
Volunteer reenactors near the Early Settler's Sod Cottage

Howick Historical Village is an open air living museum, which depicts a New Zealand village dating to between 1840 and 1880. The museum primarily focuses on local history, exploring Māori and early colonial European history of East Auckland, including Howick and Pakuranga, as well as the Royal New Zealand Fencible Corps, settlers who established local defensive settlements to the south of Auckland. As a living museum, the village features a large number of costumed volunteer interpreters, primarily in domestic or agricultural settings. Every second Sunday of the month, the village hosts a live day, which includes activities and larger numbers of costumed staff.

The historical village is located on Bells Road in Lloyd Elsmore Park, Pakuranga in Auckland, and covers an area of 7 acres (2.8 ha). It contains over 33 historic buildings, including Fencible cottages, a parsonage, a court house, an old shop, and manages 1860s heritage gardens that surround the buildings. The village is used as a wedding venue, and is used for school group education programmes.

== History ==
=== Establishment ===
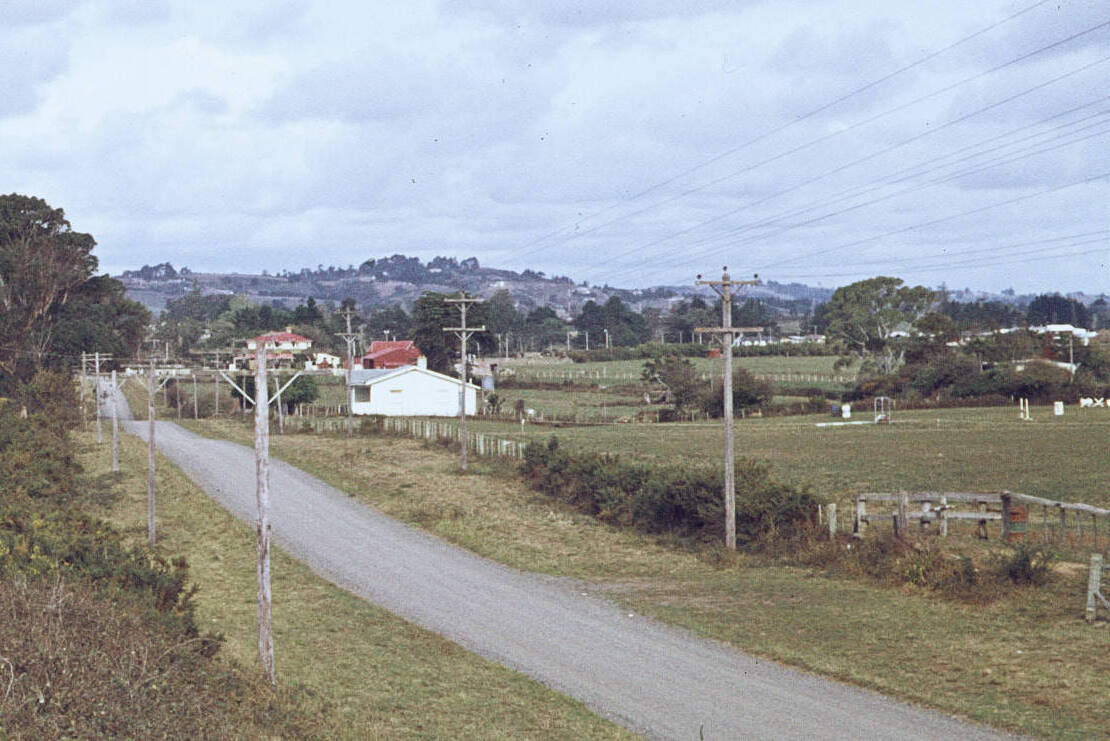
Future site of Howick Historical Village in 1973

Howick Historical Village has its origins in the Howick Historical Society (later known as the Howick and Districts Historical Society), which was established on 23 May 1962 by Dee Collings, Eileen Martenson and Alwyn Zellman, three women from Howick who had an interest in protecting the history of Howick. The members had prepared a collection of Fencibles artefacts for the 1947 centenary celebrations of the All Saint's Church, Howick. The members were joined by historian Alan la Roche, who became the driving force behind the establishment of Howick Historical Village.

The society first began planning a historical village in the 1960s, in response to encroaching urbanisation in the wider Howick area, and a need for a location for historical houses to be moved. In 1964, the Howick Historical Society was offered a Fencible cottage from Jellicoe Road, Panmure, to use for a museum. The society intended to collect older buildings for donation to the Howick Borough Council, however the council refused to support these plans, due to concerns about borer from Panmure being transported to Howick, and insisted that the building be heavily fumigated. The cottage was gradually restored by Arthur White, a retired builder, reopening at the Emilia Maud Nixon Tainui Garden of Memories in October 1966.

The society's second building, Bell House, was offered by the Bell family in 1972. Originally located near Pakuranga Creek, the house was moved to Bell Road in 1895. In 1972, the Manukau City Council acquired Lloyd Elsmore Park from Neil Housing, which included Bell House, and began allocating areas for sporting and cultural activities within the park. The council offered a 5 acres (2.0 ha) block next to the location of Bell House to the society, which became the future site for the Howick Historical Village. In 1976, Howick Historical Society opened Bell House to the public, which was operated as a restaurant.

Development of the historical village began in 1977. Over the next three years, 13 additional buildings were moved onto the site, including many that had been located at the Emilia Maud Nixon Tainui Garden of Memories in Howick.

The Howick Colonial Village was formally opened on 8 March 1980, in a ceremony attended by Minister for Sport and Recreation Allan Highet. In 1983, two trained teachers were appointed to the village as full-time education officers, in response to the village's popularity with school groups and children, and in the following year, Howick Colonial Village won the Tourist Facility section award for the Tourism Design Awards.

A monument to Wiremu Te Wheoro was donated to the village by Te Wheoro's grand niece Rachel Ngeungeu Zister in 1988. In the year 2000, the monument was removed and returned to the Waikato Region.

The Howick Colonial Village was renamed in 1990, becoming the Howick Historical Village, due to the growing association of the word colonial with British colonialism.

=== Development as a living museum ===
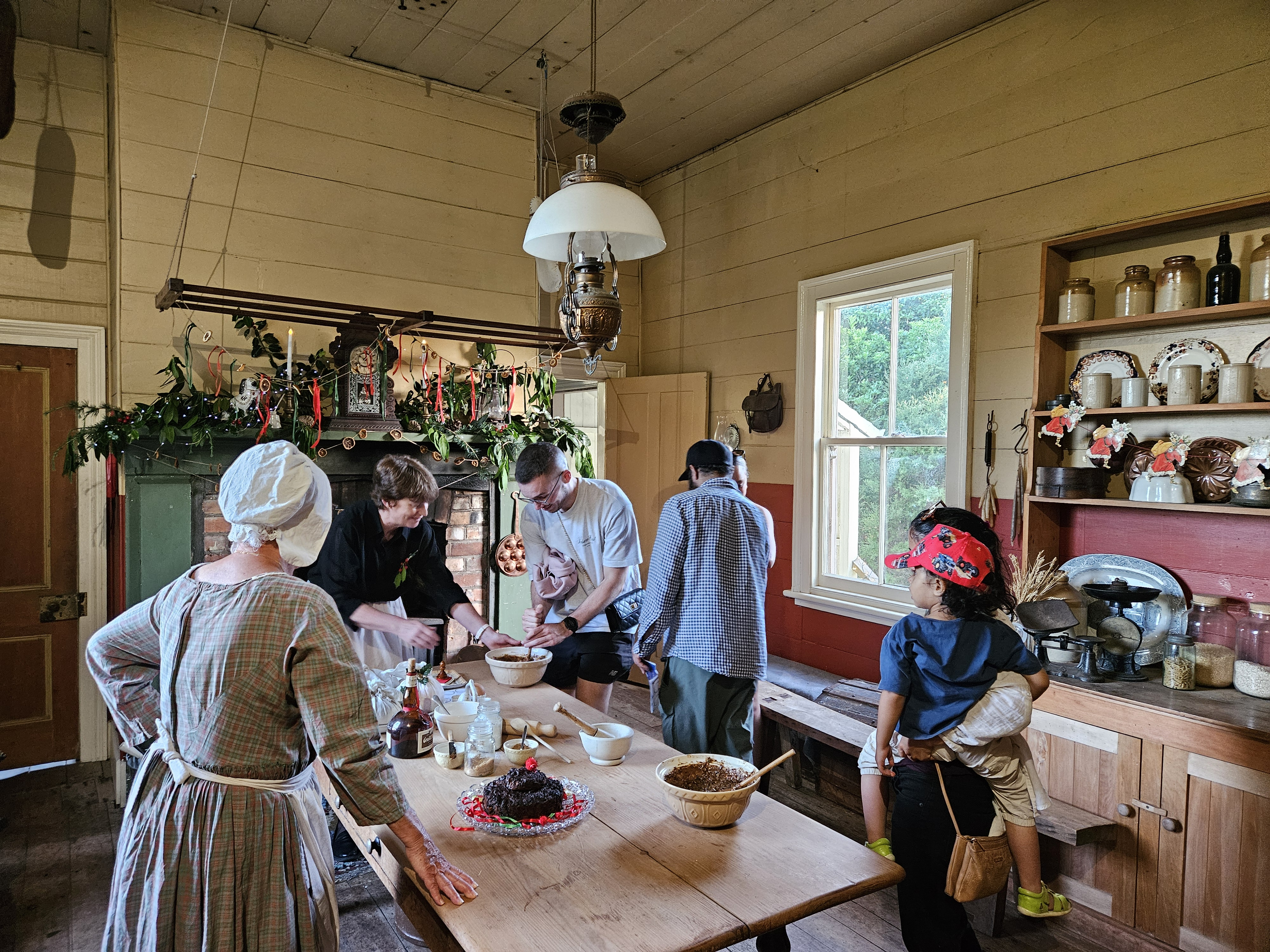
Historical reenactors helping visitors stir Christmas pudding at Puhi Nui

Historian Alan la Roche served as the honorary director of the village from 1980 until 2007. In 1991, la Roche was awarded a Winston Churchill Fellowship, which led to him touring the United States and Canada, investigating how similarly-focused museums operate in these countries. This led to la Roche redeveloping the village as a living museum, where history is experienced through experiential interpretation and recreation of historical settings.

In March 1997, White's Homestead was opened as a new administration building for the village. By 1999, the museum had approximately 120 volunteers.

Restoration of Sergeant Ford's Fencible cottage began in 2016, supported by the New Zealand Lottery Grants Board. After further deterioration was identified, the Stevenson Village Trust helped fund the additional $30,000 needed to restore the cottage. In 2019, the Pakuranga School house was restored with funding provided by the lotteries commission.

On 26 May 2020, the village reported that it had suffered serious financial difficulties as a result of the COVID-19 pandemic, had cut staff, and was actively seeking financial support from Auckland Council and other agencies. In the following year, the first artist in residence was appointed at the Howick Historical Village, Toni Mosley.

== Governance and funding ==
The museum is owned and operated by the Howick & Districts Historical Society, a registered charity. It is primarily funded through the Howick Local Board and by visitor donations.

The facility was almost entirely volunteer-based for its first 18 years of operation. Many volunteers have connections to Howick, including volunteer carpenter Arthur White, who is a descendant of James White, and historian Alan la Roche, whose father was Ernie La Roche, the first mayor of Howick Borough.

Krissy Perrett became the general manager of the Howick Historical Village in 2020. In 2022, Lexie Palmer-Gapper, formerly of the Cashmere Museum and Pioneer Village, became the general manager of Howick Historical Village.

== Buildings and features ==
Image	Name	Year built	Former location	Information
	Ararimu Valley School	1876	Ararimu Road, Ararimu	Built in 1876, the school was closed in 1890, then being used by the Methodist Church for services and Sunday school. It was donated to the village and moved in 1979, and re-opened for use in 1984.
	Sergeant Barry's Cottage	1849	110 Cook Street, Howick	House built for fencible Sergeant W. H. Barry in 1849, located at 110 Cook Street, Howick. After Barry was dismissed from the fencibles for cricising a senior officer who was embezzling funds, the house was occupied by Sergeant Richard Nolan Barry. The structure was moved to the Emilia Maud Nixon Garden of Memories, and later Howick Historical Village in 1980. The house incorporates curved window glass. The cottage presents life as it was in the 1880s.
	Bell House	1850	Pakuranga	Also known as Captain C. H. M. Smith's Homestead. Built in 1850 for Captain Charles Henry Montressor-Smith of the Royal New Zealand Fencible Corps. Montressor-Smith sold his land to Robert King, who after 12 years sold the property to Scottish immigrant David Bell. In 1895, the house was moved from near the Pakuranga Creek to its current location. In 1974, the Bell family donated the house and grounds to the New Zealand Historic Places Trust. The house is listed as a Category 1 Heritage New Zealand historic place.
	Bell's Barn	c. 1850/1851	Pakuranga	Originally located near Pakuranga Creek. The barn is listed as a Category 2 Heritage New Zealand historic place.
	Bishop's Creek Dame School	1842	Manawa Road, Remuera	Built in 1842 on Manawa Road, Remuera by Joseph Tara Tete, it originally operated as a school for Māori children of Ngā Oho (Ngāti Whātua Ōrākei), who lived at Pukupuku Pa on the edge of the Ōrākei Basin. In 1882, Alfred Mynn Bishop bought the land, and his sitter taught young students in the school. The school was donated to the village in 1988 by Graeme Craw, and opened in 1990.
	Private Henry Brindle's Cottage	1855	Drake Street, Howick	The cottage has been restored to its appearance as it was in 1880.
	Briody-McDaniel Cottage	1850	Jellicoe Road, Panmure	Built in 1850, the double-unit Fencible cottage was the location where Fencibles John Briody and Edward McDaniel lived. The Briody residence presents live as it was in the 1850s, while the McDaniel cottage is staged to depict live in the 1860s.
	Private John Briody's Raupō	N/A	N/A	Replica created in the style of a raupō hut similar to those made in 1848 by Māori assisting new settlers. Briody lived in a raupō hut before a more permanent wooden cottage had been built.
	John Bycroft's Flour Mill	1843	Manurewa	Built in 1843 and originally located in Manurewa, at the modern-day location of the Auckland Botanic Gardens.
	Carpenter's Workshop & Bodger's Camp	1848	Howick	
	Charcoal Burner's Camp	N/A	N/A	Replica of a working camp.
	The Coach House	1860	Ryle Street, Ponsonby	Originally owned by Auckland merchant William Smellie Grahame, the Auckland City Council donated the building to the village in 1977.
	Colonel De Quincey's Farm Cottage	1862	Pakuranga	Originally located on the opposite side of Pakuranga Creek to the historical village, it was owned by Paul Frederick de Quincey, son of essayist Thomas De Quincey. In 1978, the former De Quincey farm was subdivided, leading owner Hugh Green to donate the building to the Howick Historical Village. The cottage is used to display the Māori history of East Auckland.
	Early Settler's Sod Cottage	1980	N/A	A replica of an early settlers' sod cottage. The cottage design is identical to cottages built in Ireland, Scotland and Wales dating to the same period, and at least 15 sod cottages are known to have been built in Howick. The replica was built in 1980, and the right hand glass window was salvaged from John Goonan's fencible cottage.
	Thomas Eckford's Farm Homestead	1851	Maraetai	Thomas Eckford moved to Maraetai in 1851, building a farmstead and establishing a farm and gold mine. The building was donated to the village in 1978 by Graeme Strauchan. After the building was moved to the village in the same year, it was restored, and reopened in 1985.
	Patrick Fitzpatrick's Cottage	1854	197 Gills Road, Half Moon Bay	Built in 1854 by Patrick and Ann Fitzpatrick, the cottage became a major centre of social life for Pakuranga in the early 20th century. Moved from Ōhuiarangi / Pigeon Mountain, Gills Road, Half Moon Bay in 1997, the cottage is listed as a Category 2 Heritage New Zealand historic place.
	Sergeant Michael Ford's Cottage	1850	Panmure	Ford sold the building in 1854 to Solomon Levey. After Levey went into debt, the property was eventually taken over by carpenter Jerome Cadman, who sold the property in 1864 to the Church of England, becoming a schoolmaster's home until 1873, and likely rented out by the church after this date. Prior to the building moving to the village in 1994, it was used by John Allen, who established a plant nursery next to the house. It opened to the public after refurbishment in 1996. The cottage depicts life in the 1850s.
	Private James Hanson's Tent	N/A	N/A	Replica created in the style of a tent dating to 1849/1850. James Hanson and his wife Mary Ann Hanson lived in a similar tent at Onehunga, alongside their two children, after his raupō cottage had burnt down, while waiting for Bell House to be constructed.
	Hemi Pepene's Raupō Cottage	N/A	N/A	Reconstructed raupō cottage owned by Hemi Pepene, one of the most successful farmers in Pakuranga in the 1850s.
	Howick Arms Hotel / James White's General Store & Post Office	1847	40 Galway Street, Onehunga	Originally a fencible cottage built in 1847 for Charles Jeffery Beswick and Thomas Rowlands. Moved to the village on 18 Jan 1979, now housing recreations of the Howick Arms Hotel and James White's Store. The Howick Arms Hotel was constructed in 1849 and was located on Howe Street, Howick, and was operated by Fencible Owen Lynch until his death in 1862, after which his wife Ellen Lynch operated the hotel for a year. The Howick Arms was operated by Peter Brady until 1875, and by William Lundon until the hotel burnt down in 1888. James White's general store (dating to 1847/1848) was located on Elliot Street, Howick, and operated as a general store, post office, and became a social meeting place for early Howick residents. The recreated post office opened at Howick Historical Village in 1982, and the general store in 1983, featuring a recreation of how the store would have looked in the 1850s.
	The Howick Court House	1851	Baird Street/Moore Street, Howick	Built in 1850 or 1851, the courthouse was located opposite the village green on the corner of Baird Street and Moore Street in Howick, and heard cases from Howick, Panmure and Tāmaki districts until c. 1875. In 1907, the New Zealand Government passed ownership of the building to the Howick Town Board, who moved it in 1910 to Picton Street, where it was used as a public library. It was moved to the Emilia Maud Nixon Garden of Memories in 1969 and used as a colonial museum, and subsequently to the village on 31 May 1979.
	Johnson's Cottage	1840s	Earle Street, Parnell	Built in the late 1840s by Samuel Allen Woods in Earle Street, Parnell, the two-roomed cottage later became a confectioner's shop and a private residence. After being purchased by William Carr in 1860, Carr sold the building to Ann Tannhouse in 1863, who operated it as a shop with Catherine Kavanagh, who inherited the shop after Tannhouse died in 1874. Bryan Johnson, Murray Johnson, and Margaret Sloane, great-grandchildren of Kavanagh, donated the building to Howick Historical Village in 1978. Today cottage houses a small children's museum, as well as a replica cabin of the Minerva that brought the Fencibles to Howick.
	Dr. Lange's Cottage	c.1880	Princes Street, Ōtāhuhu	
	Logan's Shed & Duckworth's Bread Oven	N/A	N/A	
	Maher-Gallagher Cottage	1852	Jellicoe Road, Panmure	Built in 1852, the double-unit cottage was the location where fencibles Private Bartholomew Maher and Thomas Gallagher lived. The building was moved to the village in December 1978. The Maher side of the cottage is left unrestored.
	Nga Mapu's Raupō Cottage	N/A	N/A	Reconstruction of a raupō whare occupied by mail runner Nga Mapu. The original structure was built in 1849, and was located on Elliot Street in Howick. The interior is a reconstruction of how many Māori lived the 1850s in European communities, prior to the New Zealand Wars.
	Pakuranga School	1880	William Green Domain, Bucklands Beach	Originally opened in 1880 on Pakuranga Highway at the site of modern-day William Green Domain, it was moved to the village in 1978. The building is used by the village for educational activities on weekdays.
	The Parsonage	1848	Cook Street, Howick	Also known as the Howick Vicarage. Built in 1848 by C. H. Montressor Smith, the building was purchased by the Anglican Church as a parsonage in October 1849, and was the first resident vicar of Howick, Vicesimus Lush. The building was moved to the village in September 1974.
	Puhi Nui Homestead	1861	Roscommon Road, Wiri	Also known as the Mclaughlin Homestead. Built in 1861 in modern-day Wiri from kauri timber for William McLaughlin, the house was located between Matukutūreia / McLaughlins Mountain and the Puhinui Creek, on the McLaughlin's 1,152 ha (2,850 acres) property located between the Manukau Harbour and Great South Road, which they had purchased in 1845. The homestead was lived in by the McLaughlin family for generations, until the structure was donated to the village by William's grandson Tom McLaughlin, and moved to the historical village in 1982. Puhi Nui opened for visitors after renovations in 2004.
	George Sommerville's Cowshed and Creamery	1860	Cream Stand Corner, Somerville	Formerly owned by George Reid Somerville, used from 1860 until 1930 on the Somerville, when a new cow shed was constructed and the original building was used as storage. Donated to the village in 1984 by Archie Somerville, and reopened for the public in 1986.
	Udy's Barn	1874	Udys Road, Pakuranga	Built by John and Richard Udy near Pakuranga Creek. The barn is used as a workshop for Howick Historical Village staff.
	George Wagstaff's Shop	1855	Howe Street, Howick	Also known as Wagstaff's Forge, and George Wagstaff's Blacksmiths Shop. Wagstaff established a blacksmiths shop in Howe Street, Howick in 1855, which continued to be operated by his son George after he died in 1892. The blasksmith's shop was reconstructed for the village in 1981.
	Howick Wesleyan-Methodist Church	1851	Picton Street, Howick	Also known as the Howick Methodist Church, the first church services were held on 7 July 1852. It was moved to the village in 1980.
	White's Homestead	1897	Glenmore Road, Pakuranga	Originally the residence of George White and Elizabeth White, the building was moved to the village in November 1995 by the family of Ron White, and serves as the entry and exit to Howick Historical Village, and as the main administration building.

== Collections ==
Howick Historical Village operates a by-appointment research library. The Howick Historical Village has one of the largest historic textile collections in New Zealand, and holds historical artifacts from the area that have been collected by the Howick and Districts Historical Society. This includes farm machinery displays, including a McCormick Deering horse drawn reaper and binder, a wheat drill from Cascade Farm in Pakuranga, a manure spreader, a farm sledge, a farm roller and a solid rubber tyre.

== Media ==
Howick Historical Village has been used as a shooting location for various film and television projects, including the films Savage Play (1995), Mahana (2016), and the Cannes Film Festival-entry short film Jess (2014). The village was the shooting location for the New Zealand historical drama series Hanlon (1985), and the television series The Brokenwood Mysteries' 2017 episode "Stone Cold Dead". Since 2016, the village has been used as a set to film for the YouTube group Viva La Dirt League.

== Bibliography ==
- La Roche, Alan (1997). An Introduction to the Howick Historical Village. Auckland: Howick and Districts Historical Society. ISBN 978-0-473-04666-8.
- La Roche, Alan (2011). Grey's Folly: A History of Howick, Pakuranga, Bucklands-Eastern Beaches, East Tamaki, Whitford, Beachlands and Maraetai. Auckland: Tui Vale Productions. ISBN 978-0-473-18547-3.
