= India women's national field hockey team results =

This page provides an index of the results of the India women's national field hockey team, with matches divided into period-specific articles. These pages include all the official competitions and unofficial matches that were sanctioned by the Hockey India and International Hockey Federation (FIH). The results of the India women's national field hockey team are divided into period-specific articles, generally corresponding to Olympic cycles. The first article covers the team's matches from 1953 to 1956, following India's first recorded international tournament in 1953. (Note: The tournament was not sanctioned by the FIH. So all the matches played are not counted as official.)

- India women's national field hockey team results (1953–1956)
- India women's national field hockey team results (1957–1960)
- India women's national field hockey team results (1961–1964)
- India women's national field hockey team results (1965–1968)
- India women's national field hockey team results (1969–1972)
- India women's national field hockey team results (1973–1976)
- India women's national field hockey team results (1977–1980)
- India women's national field hockey team results (1981–1984)
- India women's national field hockey team results (1985–1988)
- India women's national field hockey team results (1989–1992)
- India women's national field hockey team results (1993–1996)
- India women's national field hockey team results (1997–2000)
- India women's national field hockey team results (2001–2004)
- India women's national field hockey team results (2005–2008)
- India women's national field hockey team results (2009–2012)
- India women's national field hockey team results (2013–2016)
- India women's national field hockey team results (2017–2020)
- India women's national field hockey team results (2021–2024)
- India women's national field hockey team results (2025–2028)

== See also ==
- India men's national field hockey team results
