= Amir Ali (field hockey) =

Indian field hockey player

Personal information
- Born: 2 May 2004 (age 22) Lucknow, Uttar Pradesh, India

Sport
- Sport: Field hockey
- Position: Defender
Senior career
| Years | Team | Caps | Goals |
| 2024– | Team Gonasika | - | - |
National team
| Years | Team | Caps | Goals |
| 2022–2025 | India U21 | 50 | (3) |
| 2024– | India | 8 | (0) |
Medal record
Men's field hockey
Representing India
Asian Champions Trophy
| Gold medal – first place | 2024 Hulunbuir |
Junior World Cup
| Bronze medal – third place | 2025 Tamil Nadu |
Junior Asia Cup
| Gold medal – first place | 2023 Salalah |
| Gold medal – first place | 2024 Muscat |

Amir Ali (born 2 May 2004) is an Indian field hockey player. He made his senior India debut in the 2024 Asian Champions Trophy. He plays as a defender for Uttar Pradesh in the domestic tournaments and Team Gonasika in the Hockey India League.

== Early life ==
Ali is from Lucknow, Uttar Pradesh. His father is a motorcycle mechanic, Tasawar Ali. He took to hockey at the age of ten at K. D. Singh Babu Stadium, Lucknow and learnt his basics under his first coach Rashid Aziz Khan. In grade sixth, he was selected into Major Dhyanchand Sports College in 2014 and trained under Mohammad Zia Ur Rahman. He returned to Lucknow in 2019 and rejoined his first coach Khan in Sports Authority of India's Lucknow center.

== Career ==
Ali made his senior India debut winning a gold medal in the 2024 Asian Champions Trophy. He also played in the Indian team at the 2023–24 Men's FIH Pro League. He was part of the Indian junior team at the Sultan of Johor Cup for three years where India won gold in 2022 and bronze in 2023 and 2024. He was also part of the Indian team at the 2023 Junior World Cup where India finished fourth. He captained the Indian team to a gold medal at the 2024 Junior Asia Cup, to add to his previous Junior Asia Cup gold in the 2023 edition.
