= Lloyd Elsmore Park =

Park in Auckland, New Zealand

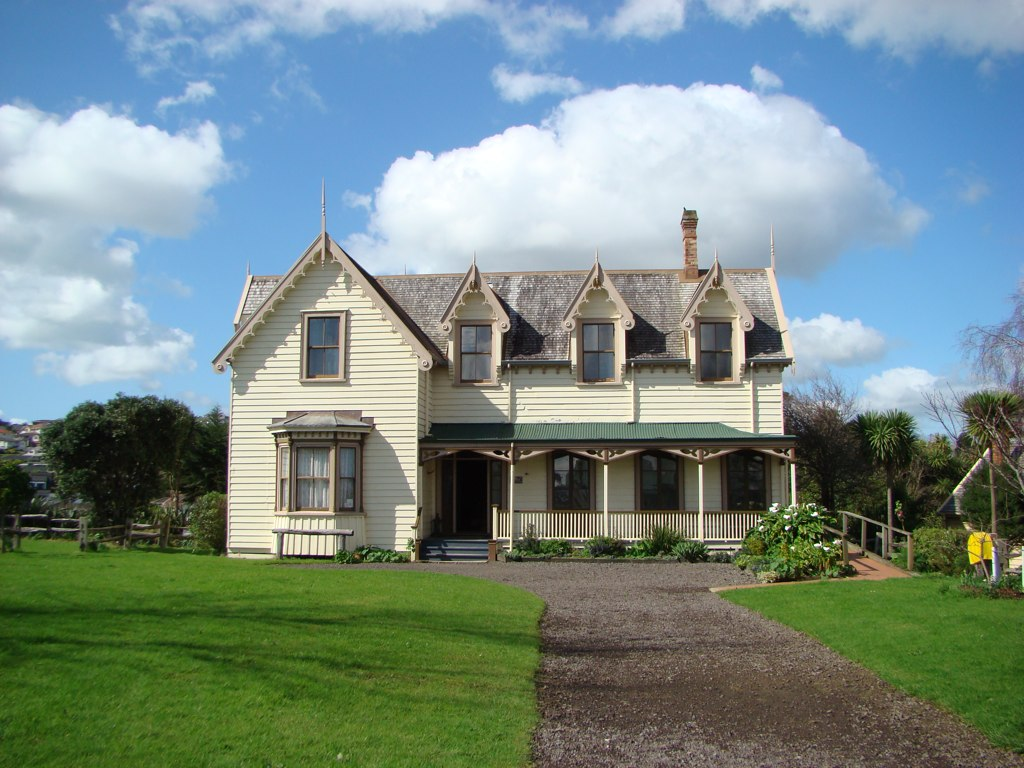
- Puhi Nui at Howick Historical Village
- Interactive map of Lloyd Elsmore Park
- Type: Public park
- Location: Auckland, New Zealand
- Coordinates: 36.905°S 174.901°E
- Area: 80 hectares (200 acres)
- Operator: Auckland Council
- Status: Open year round

Lloyd Elsmore Park
- Interactive map of Lloyd Elsmore Park

Ground information
- Location: Auckland, New Zealand

International information
- First women's T20I: 17 January 2024: Cook Islands v Fiji
- Last women's T20I: 19 January 2024: Cook Islands v Vanuatu
- As of 19 January 2024; Source: Lloyd Elsmore Park 1 Cricinfo

Lloyd Elsmore Park 2
- Interactive map of Lloyd Elsmore Park 2

Ground information
- Location: Auckland, New Zealand

International information
- First women's T20I: 17 January 2024: Cook Islands v Samoa
- Last women's T20I: 21 January 2024: Samoa v Vanuatu
- As of 21 January 2024; Source: Lloyd Elsmore Park 2 Cricinfo

Lloyd Elsmore Park 3
- Interactive map of Lloyd Elsmore Park 3

Ground information
- Location: Auckland, New Zealand

International information
- First women's T20I: 17 January 2024: Fiji v Vanuatu
- Last women's T20I: 21 January 2024: Cook Islands v Fiji
- As of 21 January 2024; Source: Lloyd Elsmore Park 3 Cricinfo

Lloyd Elsmore Park is an urban park in East Auckland, New Zealand. The park is one of the largest venues for sports clubs in the city, and is home to both the Lloyd Elsmore Park Pool and Leisure Centre and Howick Historical Village.

== Description ==
Lloyd Elsmore Park is one of the largest parks for sports clubs in Auckland, and is located in Pakuranga Heights. The park is bound by Pakuranga Road, Cascades Road and the Pakuranga Stream. The Lloyd Elsmore Path is a walking track found within the park, and the park is adjacent to Cascades Path, an 8 kilometre cycling and walking track to the south-east along the Botany Creek, that ends in Somerville. Much of Pakuranga Stream, which flows along the eastern edge of the park, was converted into a concrete canal during the park's development.

== History ==
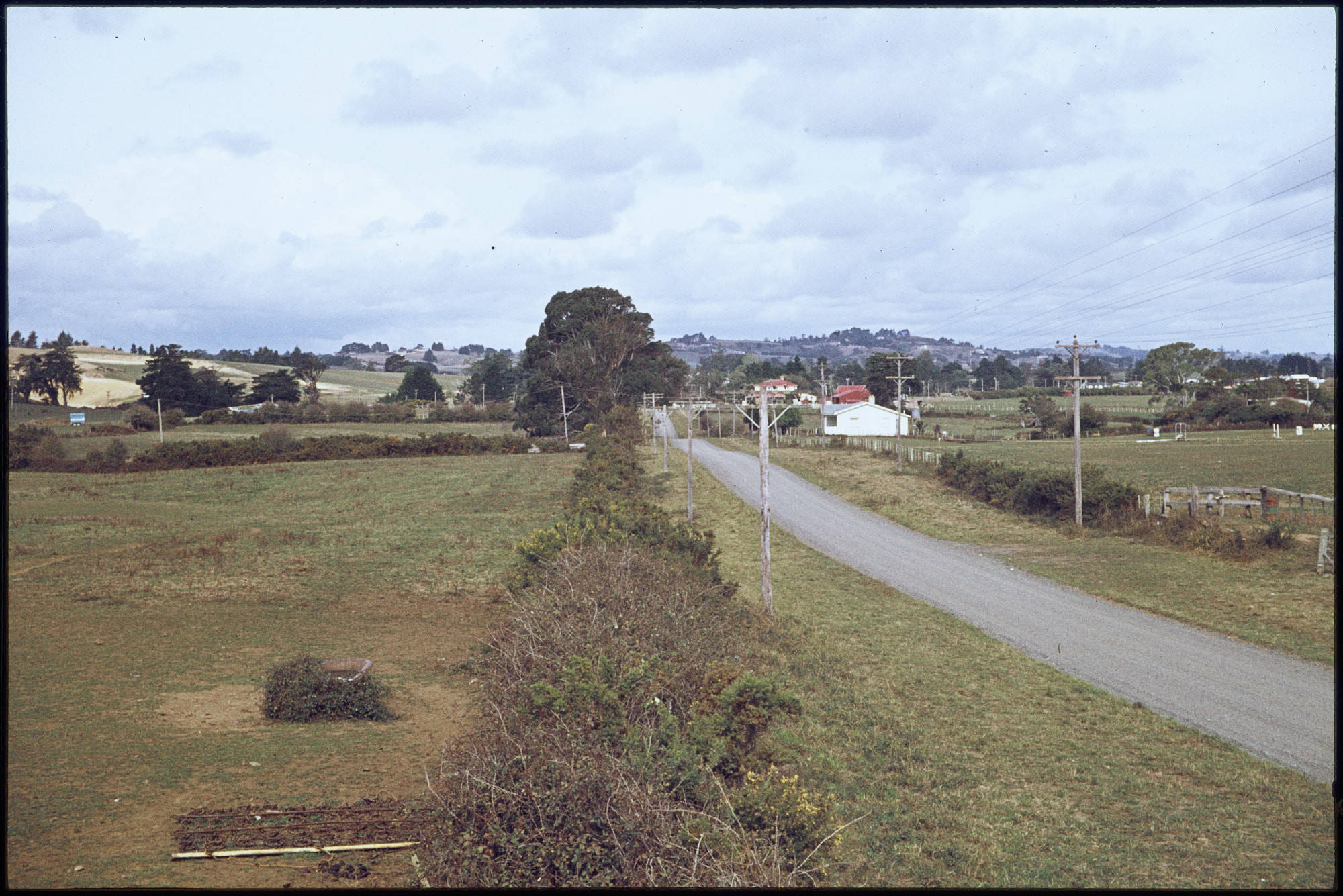
Bells Road in Pakuranga before the development of Lloyd Elsmore Park

During the 1940s, the Manukau County Council proposed that a green belt would be created between Pakuranga and Howick as the areas began to be developed for housing. In 1950, the council lost a court battle with a farmer, who wanted to develop his farm into suburban housing. The remaining portions of the green belt eventually became the site of Lloyd Elsmore Park.

The park was the former site of John Mattson's dairy farm, that the Auckland Regional Authority purchased from Neil Housing, in part to develop a bus terminal that was never constructed. In 1973, a deal was made between the Manukau City Council and the Auckland Regional Authority, where the council agreed to sell the Wiri Bus Depot on Norman Spencer Drive in return for the future sites of the Manukau Sports Bowl and Lloyd Elsmore Park.

Development of the park began in 1973 despite not being officially opened, and various community groups began using the future park.

Some of the first groups were the Auckland Pony Club in the early 1970s, Howick Little Theatre in 1974, and the Pakuranga United Rugby Club in 1975. The rugby club's land was not a part of the council-owned area, instead a space called Bell Park that had been donated by local farmer Dufty Bell in February 1968. Further groups included the Howick & District Netball Association (1975), Howick Cricket Club (1976), the Pakuranga Amateur Athletic and Harriers Club (1979) and the Lloyd Elsmore Park Badminton Club (1981).

In March 1980, Howick Historical Village (then known as the Howick Colonial Village) opened. Many of the historic buildings of the area are relocated to the village, including those that had been housed at the Emilia Maud Nixon Tainui Garden of Memories in Howick, and the former Mclaughlin homestead, Puhi Nui.

Lloyd Elsmore Park was officially opened by Prime Minister Robert Muldoon on 28 March 1981. The park was named after the Mayor of Manukau City, Lloyd Elsmore, and the official opening marked the beginning of an eight-day festival, ending with a royal visit by Prince Charles on 3 April 1981.

More community groups began using the park in the 1980s: the Pakuranga Combined Bowling Club (1983), Pakuranga Athletic Club (1984) and the Pakuranga Croquet Club (1985). In 1987, the Lloyd Elsmore Park Leisure Centre was opened as the first public pool in Pakuranga.

Lloyd Elsmore Park was used as a venue for bowling events during the 1990 Commonwealth Games. The next year, a hockey centre was constructed at the park, and in 1998 a skatepark was constructed. In 2009, and all-weather running track was constructed in the park. It will host the Indian Centenary Hockey Series in November 2026 that commemorates 100 years of hockey ties between India and New Zealand.

== Bibliography ==
- La Roche, Alan (2011). Grey's Folly: A History of Howick, Pakuranga, Bucklands-Eastern Beaches, East Tamaki, Whitford, Beachlands and Maraetai. Auckland: Tui Vale Productions. ISBN 978-0-473-18547-3. OCLC 1135039710. Wikidata Q118286377.
