= Patrick Ward (field hockey) =

New Zealand field hockey player

Personal information
- Born: 28 July 2003 (age 23) Dunedin, New Zealand

Sport
- Sport: Field hockey
- Position: Midfield
Senior career
Years	Team	Caps	Goals
–	Otago	-	-
National team
Years	Team	Caps	Goals
2022–	New Zealand U–21	14	(2)
2023–	New Zealand	3	(0)
Medal record
Men's field hockey
Representing New Zealand
Sultan Azlan Shah Cup
Bronze medal – third place	2024 Ipoh
Junior Oceania Cup
Silver medal – second place	2022 Canberra

Patrick Ward (born 28 July 2003) is a field hockey player from New Zealand.

== Life ==
Patrick Ward grew up in Dunedin, New Zealand. His older brothers, Finn and Jordan also play field hockey.

== Career ==
=== Domestic league ===
In the Ford National Hockey Championship, Ward represents Otago.

=== Under–21 ===
Ward made his international debut at under–21 level. He represented the New Zealand U–21 team at the 2022 Junior Oceania Cup in Canberra, where he won a silver medal.

In 2023, Ward continued to represent the junior national team. He made appearances at the Sultan of Johor Cup in Johor Bahru, as well as the FIH Junior World Cup in Kuala Lumpur.

=== Black Sticks ===
Ward received his first call-up to the Black Sticks in 2023. He made his international debut during season four of the FIH Pro League.

In 2024, Ward was named in the squad for the Sultan Azlan Shah Cup in Ipoh.
