= Venkatesh Kenche =

Indian field hockey player

Personal information
- Full name: Venkatesh Dhananjay Kenche
- Born: 16 August 2000 (age 26) Latur, Maharashtra, India

Sport
- Sport: Field hockey
- Position: Forward
Senior career
Years	Team	Caps	Goals
2021–	Hockey Maharashtra	41	31
2018–19	Hockey5s Maharashtra	7	2
National team
Years	Team	Caps	Goals
2026–	India		-

Venkatesh Dhananjay Kenche (born 16 August 2000) is an Indian field hockey forward player from Maharashtra.

== Early life ==
Venkatesh Kenche hails from Latur in Maharashtra. He trained at the Sports Academy in Pune for 11 years and received guidance from Olympian Ajit Lakra and coach Satara Sagar Karande.

== Career ==
Venkatesh Kenche represented Maharashtra at the 2019 Khelo India Youth Games and senior national championships. He played for India 'A' in the 2025 European tour. He played for the senior national team in the Centenary hockey series against New Zealand in November 2026.
