= Arbaz Ahmad =

Pakistani field hockey player (born 2002)

Personal information
- Born: 12 May 2002 (age 24) Gojra, Pakistan

Sport
- Sport: Field hockey
- Position: Defender
National team
Years	Team	Caps	Goals
2022–	Pakistan	22	(15)
2024–	Pakistan U–21	17	(14)
Medal record
Men's field hockey
Representing Pakistan
Sultan Azlan Shah Cup
Bronze medal – third place	2022 Ipoh
Junior Asia Cup
Silver medal – second place	2023 Salalah

Arbaz Ahmad (born 12 May 2002) is a field hockey player from Pakistan.

== Personal life ==
Arbaz Ahmad was born and raised in Gojra, a small town in Pakistan's Punjab province that is known for being a "big nursery of the game" of hockey and providing numerous players to the national team.

== Career ==
=== Senior national team ===
Arbaz Ahmad made his senior international debut in 2022 at the Sultan Azlan Shah Cup in Ipoh. At the tournament, he won a bronze medal and scored his first international goals. He later represented the national team at the inaugural edition of the FIH Nations Cup in Potchefstroom.

During 2023, Ahmad only represented the national team at one tournament, representing the team at the Asian Games in Hangzhou.

He was a member of the squad at the 2024 FIH Olympic Qualifiers in Muscat.

=== Under–21 ===
Following a successful senior debut, Ahmad represented the Pakistan U–21 throughout 2023. His first appearance came during the Junior Asia Cup in Salalah, where he won a silver medal. Following this, he represented the team again at the Sultan of Johor Cup in Johor Bahru and the FIH Junior World Cup in Kuala Lumpur.
