= Benjamin Culhane =

New Zealand field hockey player

Personal information
- Full name: Benjamin James Culhane
- Born: 23 April 2003 (age 23) Invercargill, New Zealand

Sport
- Sport: Field hockey
- Position: Defence
Senior career
Years	Team	Caps	Goals
2022–	Otago	-	-
National team
Years	Team	Caps	Goals
2022–	New Zealand U–21	8	(0)
2023–	New Zealand	11	(0)
Medal record
Men's field hockey
Representing New Zealand
Oceania Cup
Silver medal – second place	2025 Darwin
Junior Oceania Cup
Silver medal – second place	2022 Canberra

Benjamin James "Benji" Culhane (born 23 April 2003) is a New Zealand field hockey player, who plays as a defender.

== Personal life ==
Culhane was born and raised in Invercargill. His father, Simon, is a former international rugby union player.

== Career ==
=== Under–21 ===
Culhane made his international debut for New Zealand at under–21 level. He was a member of the team at the 2022 Junior Oceania Cup in Canberra, where he won a silver medal.

In 2023, Culhane was named as captain of the Junior Black Sticks. He represented the team at the Sultan of Johor Cup in Johor Bahru, finishing in sixth place. He was also named in the squad for the FIH Junior World Cup in Kuala Lumpur.

=== Black Sticks ===
Following his junior debut, Culhane was called up to make his senior international debut in 2023. He made his first appearance for the Black Sticks during season four of the FIH Pro League.
