= Boby Singh Dhami =

Indian field hockey player

Personal information
- Born: 1 July 2002 (age 24) Katiyani, Pithoragarh district, Uttarakhand

Sport
- Sport: Field hockey
- Position: Forward
- Club: Food Corporation of India
Senior career
Years	Team	Caps	Goals
–	Haryana	-	-
–	Food Corporation of India	-	-
–	Kalinga Lancers	-	-
National team
Years	Team	Caps	Goals
2021–2023	India U21	25	(11)
2024–	India	1	(1)
Medal record
Men's field hockey
Representing India
Junior Asia Cup
Gold medal – first place	2023 Salalah

Boby Singh Dhami (born 1 July 2002) is an Indian field hockey player from Uttarakhand. He made his senior India debut in April 2024 against Australia in Perth. He plays as a forward for the Food Corporation of India and Hockey Haryana in the domestic tournaments and for Kalinga Lancers in the Hero Hockey India League 2024.

== Early life and education ==
Boby Singh Dhami is from Katiyani, a village on the Nepal border, Pithoragarh district, Uttarakhand. His father Shyam Singh was a taxi driver and his mother, Hema Devi, is a housewife. He has an elder brother, Sohan. When he was 10, his father met with an accident which resulted in the death of three passengers and he was jailed. In the absence of the sole breadwinner, his mother sent both the boys to live with his brother, Prakash, at Tanakpur and later, started working as a private teacher. Being a hockey coach, Prakash introduced the boys to hockey and soon sent Boby to attend selection trials of the Maharana Pratap Sports College in Dehradun, and he was selected in March 2012. After his uncle Prakash, his first coaches at the college were Pankaj Rawat and Suresh Baunthiyal. In 2018, he joined Sports Authority of India training centre at Sonepat under coaches Varun Belwal and Piyush Dubey.

== Career ==
Dhami made his junior India debut at the Junior World Cup at Bhubaneswar in December 2021, where India finished fourth. In 2022, he was part of the Indian team which won the 2022 Sultan of Johor Cup. In 2023, he was also part of the Indian team which won the Men's Hockey Junior Asia Cup. In April 2024, he made his senior India debut in the fifth hockey test in the away series against Australia in Perth. Later in June, he was also selected for the 2023–24 FIH Pro League, where he played one match and scored his first goal for India in senior colours.
