= Rajinder Singh (field hockey, born 2002) =

Indian field hockey player (born 2002)

Personal information
- Born: 22 December 2002 (age 23) Sant Nagar, Sirsa district, Haryana, India

Sport
- Sport: Field hockey
- Position: Midfielder
- Club: Namdhari Sports Academy
Senior career
Years	Team	Caps	Goals
–	Namdhari Sports Academy	-	-
National team
Years	Team	Caps	Goals
2022–2023	India U21	27	(3)
2024–	India	62	(7)
Medal record
Men's field hockey
Representing India
Asian Games
Gold medal – first place	2026 Aichi-Nagoya	Team
Asia Cup
Gold medal – first place	2025 Rajgir
Asian Champions Trophy
Gold medal – first place	2026 Punjab
Junior Asia Cup
Gold medal – first place	2023 Salalah

Rajinder Singh (born 22 December 2002) is an Indian hockey player. He made his senior Indian debut in the two-match series against Germany in October 2024. He plays for Haryana in the domestic tournaments and for Hyderabad Toofans in the Hockey India League.

== Early life and education ==
Singh is from Sant Nagar village, Sirsa district, Haryana. He is the son of a land-owning farmer and took up hockey by chance when he joined the Namdhari Academy to get a new hockey stick, like others in his village. He learnt his basics under coach Harwinder Singh and later, former Indian skipper Sardara Singh, who hails from the same village, became his mentor. His Haryana state coach is Sandeep Sangwan.

== Career ==
In October 2022, Singh's first big medal came in the 2022 Sultan of Johor Cup, held at Johor Bahru, Malaysia, where India won the gold medal. Next year, he was in the Indian team that won a bronze medal in the 2023 Sultan of Johor Cup. In December, he was also part of the India team that came fourth in the 2023 Junior World Cup. In 2023, he played in the Indian team that won the Junior Asia Cup. He also participated in the FIH pro league for men in the 2022–23 season.
