= Mohith H. S. =

Indian field hockey player (2002)

Personal information
- Full name: Mohith Honnenahalli Shashikumar
- Born: 27 February 2002 (age 24) Channarayapatna, Hassan district, Karnataka, India

Sport
- Country: India
- Sport: Field hockey
- Position: Goalkeeper
- Club: Hockey Karnataka
National team
| Years | Team | Caps | Goals |
| 2022–2023 | India U21 | | - |
| 2024– | India | 27 | - |
Medal record
Men's field hockey
Representing India
Asian Games
| Gold medal – first place | 2026 Aichi-Nagoya |
Men's Hockey Junior Asia Cup
| Gold medal – first place | 2023 Salalah | Team |
Sultan of Johor Cup
| Gold medal – first place | 2022 Johor Bahru | Team |
| Bronze medal – third place | 2023 Johor Bahru | Team |

Mohith H. S. (born 27 February 2002) is an Indian field hockey player who plays as a goalkeeper for the Indian national team.

== Early life and background ==
Mohith was born in Channarayapatna in the Hassan district of Karnataka, India. He initially trained as a volleyball player (spiker) at a sports hostel in Hassan. When the hostel's field hockey squad faced a shortage of goalkeepers for a tournament, his coach asked him to step in as a temporary replacement.

Although he initially expressed a desire to play outfield as a forward, his coach encouraged him to remain in goal, recognizing his reflexes and potential. He subsequently honed his skills through the national setup, including training at the Sports Authority of India (SAI) National Centre of Excellence in Bhopal.

== Career ==
=== Junior career ===
At the junior international level, Mohith represented the India junior national team across several tournaments. He was part of the squad that won gold at the 2022 Sultan of Johor Cup and returned the following year to claim a bronze medal at the 2023 Sultan of Johor Cup. In 2023, he also secured a gold medal at the 2023 Men's Hockey Junior Asia Cup in Salalah, Oman. Later that year, he served as India's frontline goalkeeper at the 2023 Men's FIH Hockey Junior World Cup in Kuala Lumpur, helping the team secure a fourth-place finish.

=== Senior career ===
Mohith transitioned to senior international hockey with appearances at tournaments such as the Sultan Azlan Shah Cup and the Men's FIH Pro League, where he notably won a penalty shootout against Australia and contributed to victories against the Netherlands and Germany.

In 2026, he was selected for the Indian squad for the 2026 Men's FIH Hockey World Cup in Belgium and the Netherlands, sharing goalkeeping duties with Suraj Karkera.
