= Poovanna Chandura Boby =

Indian hockey player (born 2002)

Poovanna Chandura Boby (born 5 October 2002) is an Indian field hockey player from Karnataka. He plays as a defender for the Indian national team and represents State Bank of India in domestic tournaments. He represented Bengal Tigers in the Hero Hockey India League.

Boby is from Kandangala village, Virajpet taluk, Kodagu, Karnataka. He was inspired to take up hockey after watching the Kodava family hockey festival. He worked with CAG office in Chhattisgarh.

== Career ==
He represented India in the 2022 Sultan of Johor Cup held at Johor Bahru, Malaysia where India won the gold medal. He was also part of the Indian team which won the bronze in the Sultanof Johor Cup in 2023. In 2023, he represented Junior India in the 2023 FIH Junior World Cup (Men), where India finished fourth. In the same year, he was also part of the gold winning Indian team at the Men's Junior Asia Cup 2023.

In February 2026, he was selected for the FIH Pro League matches in Hobart from February 20 to 25.
