= James Carleton (field hockey) =

English field hockey player (born 2001)

Personal information
- Born: 18 January 2005 (age 21) England

Sport
- Sport: Field hockey
- Position: Goalkeeper
Senior career
Years	Team	Caps	Goals
2023–2025	Exeter Univ	-	-
National team
Years	Team	Caps	Goals
2025–	England		-
Medal record
Representing (United Kingdom) Great Britain U21
Sultan of Johor Cup
Gold medal – first place	2024 Johor Bahru	Team

James Carleton (born 18 January 2005) is an English field hockey player who plays as a goalkeeper for the England men's national field hockey team.

== Biography ==
Carleton was educated at St Paul's C of E Primary School and studied economics at the University of Exeter.

He made his England U16 debut against Wales in 2021 and quickly followed this with appearances at U17 and U19 level in the same year. He participated in the 4 Nations Invitational Tournament in Düsseldorf and was capped by England at full senior level indoors on 1 June 2024. He won a gold medal for Great Britain U21 in the 2024 Sultan of Johor Cup in Malaysia.

Carleton played his club hockey for University of Exeter Hockey Club in the Men's England Hockey League from the 2023–24 Men's England Hockey League season. While at Exeter, Carleton was named in the Great Britain development squad and made his full senior debut during the Men's FIH Pro League.

He was part of the England team that was selected for the 2025 Men's EuroHockey Championship in Mönchengladbach, where England finished in sixth place.
