= Sharda Nand Tiwari =

Indian field hockey player

Personal information
- Born: 7 January 2004 (age 22) Lucknow, Uttar Pradesh, India

Sport
- Sport: Field hockey
- Position: Defender; Drag flicker
Senior career
Years	Team	Caps	Goals
2018–2019	Hockey Uttar Pradesh	16	1
2026–	HIL GC	6	-
National team
Years	Team	Caps	Goals
2019–2025	India U21	46	(29)
2026–	India	1	(1)
Medal record
Men's field hockey
Representing India
Junior World Cup
Bronze medal – third place	2025 Tamilnadu
Junior Asia Cup
Gold medal – first place	2023 Salalah
Gold medal – first place	2024 Muscat

Sharda Nand Tiwari (born 7 January 2004) is an Indian field hockey player from Uttar Pradesh, representing the national junior hockey team as a defender.

== Early life ==
Sharda Nand Tiwari hails from Simarpreet Pur village in Hazratganj. He is one of four children to his mother Rani Tiwari and father Ganga Prasad Tiwari, an escort driver of Lucknow's district magistrate. In his early days, he supported his family by working part time as a porter at a grocery shop. He received assistance from his friends and coach in obtaining hockey equipments.

== Career ==
Sharda Nand Tiwari joined SAI academy in Lucknow. He represented Team Uttar Pradesh at the 9th Hockey India Junior Men National Championship 2019 (A Division) where they won silver. He made debut for the Indian junior team at the 2019 Sultan of Johor Cup when he was 17. He was part of the Uttar Pradesh U21 team that won gold at the 2020 Khelo India Youth Games.

Sharda Nand Tiwari hit the only goal of the match through a penalty corner for India in the quarter-final against Belgium in the 2021 Junior World Cup to bring his team 1–0 victory. He was the top scorer at the 2022 Sultan of Johor Cup, with 7 goals, including two each against Australia and Great Britain, with both matches ending in 5–5 draws. He scored the only goal against Pakistan in a 2023 Junior Asia Cup group match that ended in a 1–1 draw. He was part of the team that toured Düsseldorf for the 4 Nations Invitational tournament in 2023. He missed the 2023 Junior World Cup after getting injured.

Sharda scored double against Great Britain in the 2024 Sultan of Johor Cup as India won 6–4. He scored against Malaysia in the semi-final of the 2024 Junior Asia Cup, that India won 3–1.

Sharda scored one of the two goals in the regulation time against Belgium in the quarter final of the 2025 Junior World Cup as the match tied 2–2. India won the shoot-out 4–3, with him scoring three goals from penalty strokes. He also converted one in the bronze medal contest against Argentina as India came back from two goals down to win 4–2.

Sharda competed in the 2025–26 Hockey India League for the HIL GC team. In November 2026, he played for the senior Indian team in the India–New Zealand Centenary series.
