= Hannan Shahid =

Pakistani field hockey player (born 2005)

Personal information
- Born: 7 September 2005 (age 21) Lahore, Punjab, Pakistan
- Height: 1.76 m (5 ft 9 in)

Sport
- Sport: Field hockey
- Position: Forward
National team
| Years | Team | Caps | Goals |
| 2021– | Pakistan U–21 | 23 | (11) |
| 2022– | Pakistan | 62 | (27) |
Medal record
Men's field hockey
Representing Pakistan
Asian Games
| Bronze medal – third place | 2026 Aichi-Nagoya | Team |
Asian Champions Trophy
| Bronze medal – third place | 2024 Hulunbuir |
Sultan Azlan Shah Cup
| Silver medal – second place | 2024 Ipoh |
| Bronze medal – third place | 2022 Ipoh |
Junior Asia Cup
| Silver medal – second place | 2023 Salalah |
| Silver medal – second place | 2024 Muscat |

Abdul Hannan Shahid (born 7 September 2005) is a Pakistani field hockey player.

== Career ==
=== Under–21 ===
Shahid made his international debut at under–21 level, where he was a member of the national team at the 2021 FIH Junior World Cup in Bhubaneswar.

He didn't represent the Pakistan U–21 side again until 2023. He won a silver medal at the Junior Asia Cup in Salalah, where he was also named player of the tournament. Following the Junior Asia Cup, he took over captaincy of the team, leading the team at the Sultan of Johor Cup in Johor Bahru and the FIH Junior World Cup in Kuala Lumpur.

=== Senior national team ===
Following a successful junior debut, Shahid made his senior international debut in 2022 at the Asian Cup in Jakarta. He went on to make multiple appearances throughout the year, representing the team at the Commonwealth Games in Birmingham, the Sultan Azlan Shah Cup in Ipoh and the inaugural edition of the FIH Nations Cup in Potchefstroom.

During 2023, Shahid only represented the national team at the Asian Champions Trophy in Chennai, where he was also named Rising Star of the Tournament. He was also named as a reserve player for the Asian Games in Hangzhou.

He was a member of the squad at the 2024 FIH Olympic Qualifiers in Muscat and the silver medal-winning side at the 2024 Sultan Azlan Shah Cup in Ipoh.
