= Angad Bir Singh =

Indian field hockey player

Personal information
- Born: 8 June 2002 (age 24) Chandigarh, India

Sport
- Sport: Field hockey
- Position: Forward
- Club: CAG
Senior career
Years	Team	Caps	Goals
–	Hockey Chandigarh	-	-
–	CAG	-	-
National team
Years	Team	Caps	Goals
2022–2023	India U21	21	(7)
2025–	India	2	(0)
Medal record
Men's field hockey
Representing India
Asian Champions Trophy
Gold medal – first place	2026 Punjab
Junior Asia Cup
Gold medal – first place	2023 Salalah

Angad Bir Singh (born 8 June 2002) is an Indian hockey player from Chandigarh. He plays for the Indian national team as a forward. He is registered with the Comptroller & Auditor General of India, and plays for Hockey Chandigarh in the domestic tournaments. He played for Vedanta Kalinga Lancers in the 2024–25 Hockey India League.

== Early life and education ==
Singh is born and brought up in Chandigarh. He is the son of Arvinder Pal Singh. He has two sisters, the elder Brahmjot and twin Upneet, and all three used to play hockey during their childhood. Their house is close to the Sector 42 stadium, where the family watched many hockey games together, but he was rejected admission at the Chandigarh Hockey Academy. He learnt his basics from his first coach, Alpinder Singh and was spotted and mentored by former India star Deepak Thakur, who got him a guest player seat at the Indian Oil Corporation team. He did his schooling at Ryan International School, Sector 49 and later did his graduation in computer applications at GGDSD College in Sector 32, Chandigarh.

== Career ==
In October 2022, Singh was part of the Indian team that won the 2022 Sultan of Johor Cup, at Johor Bahru, Malaysia. He was part of the Indian team that won the 2023 Junior Asia Cup at Salalah, Oman, where he scored the first goal in the final match. He was selected for the senior India team for the 2022-2023 and 2023-2024 FIH Hockey Pro Leagues and made his senior debut against Ireland at Bhubaneswar in March 2025.

In August 2023, he played the 2023 Four Nations Junior Men's Invitational Tournament at Düsseldorf. Later, he played the 2023 Sultan of Johor Cup for the second year, but India could get only a bronze.
