= Aditya Lalage =

Indian field hockey player (born 2003)

Personal information
- Born: Aditya Arjun Lalage; 15 January 2003 (age 23) Wadle, Satara district, Maharashtra, India

Sport
- Sport: Field hockey
- Position: Forward
- Club: Services
Senior career
Years	Team	Caps	Goals
–	Hockey Maharashtra	-	-
–	Services	-	-
National team
Years	Team	Caps	Goals
2023	India U21	17	(6)
2024–	India	26	(3)
Medal record
Men's field hockey
Representing India
Asian Champions Trophy
Gold medal – first place	2026 Punjab
Junior Asia Cup
Gold medal – first place	2023 Salalah

Aditya Arjun Lalage (born 15 January 2003) is an Indian field hockey player from Maharashtra. He made his Indian debut in the two-match series against Germany in October 2024. He is a forward and represents Maharashtra and Services Sports Control Board in the domestic tournaments. He plays for Delhi SG Pipers, in the Hero Hockey India League.

== Early life and education ==
Lalage is from a farmer's family in Vidala village, Satara, Maharashtra. He is the youngest of four children. He learnt his basics at Krida Prabodhini Academy, a Maharashtra government's sports scheme. He was into sugarcane farming, helping his family members in the farms, but soon took up hockey after he was inspired by the film, Chak De! India.

== Career ==
Lalage was part of the junior India team that won the gold medal in the 2023 Junior Asia Cup. Later, he was also part of the team that won a bronze medal in the 2023 Sultan of Johor Cup at Johor Bahru, Malaysia. In December 2023, he played the 2023 Junior World Cup at Kuala Lumpur, Malaysia, where India finished fourth. He scored three goals in the tournament, two against Canada and one in the quarterfinals against the Netherlands.
