= Vishnukant Singh =

Indian field hockey player

Personal information
- Born: 10 August 2002 (age 24) Atagaon, Uttar Pradesh, India

Sport
- Sport: Field hockey
- Position: Mid-fielder
Senior career
Years	Team	Caps	Goals
2020–	Hockey Uttar Pradesh	26	6
2024–25	Team Gonasika	9	-
2026–	Ranchi Royals	10	-
National team
Years	Team	Caps	Goals
2018–2023	India U21	50	(6)
2022–	India	21	(2)
Medal record
Men's field hockey
Representing India
Asia Cup
Bronze medal – third place	2022 Jakarta
Asian Champions Trophy
Gold medal – first place	2024 Moqi
Gold medal – first place	2026 Punjab
Junior Asia Cup
Gold medal – first place	2023 Salalah

Vishnukant Singh (born 10 August 2002) is an Indian field hockey player, representing the national senior team as a mid-fielder.

== Early life ==
Vishnukant hails from Atagaon village in Uttar Pradesh. His mother is a homemaker and his father, Pramesh Pratap Singh, is a librarian in a college. He trained at the Meghbaran Singh Hockey Academy in Karampur and at the SAI centre in Lucknow.

== Career ==
=== Junior national team ===
Vishnukant made his debut for the Indian junior team at the 2018 Sultan of Johor Cup where he scored a goal through a penalty corner in the final against Great Britain. He scored against Netherlands in the 8 nations invitational tournament in 2019. He represented India at the 2021 and the 2023 editions of Junior World Cup. He also took part in the 2023 Junior Asia Cup and 4 nations invitational tournament in 2023.

=== Senior national team ===
Vishnukant made his senior team debut at the 2022 Asia Cup where he scored a goal against Malaysia. He played in the Centenary hockey series against New Zealand in November 2026.
