= 2001 Men's National Hockey League =

Tournament details
- Host country: Australia
- Dates: 23 February – 1 April
- Teams: 8
- Venue: 8 (in 8 host cities)

Final positions
- Champions: (New South Wales) NSW Panthers (2nd title)
- Runner-up: (Western Australia) Perth Thundersticks
- Third place: (Queensland) QLD Blades

Tournament statistics
- Matches played: 52
- Goals scored: 330 (6.35 per match)
- Top scorer(s): (Victoria (state)) Lachlan Vivian-Taylor (New South Wales) Michael McCann (13 goals)
- Best player: (Tasmania) Matthew Wells

The 2001 Men's National Hockey League was the 10th edition of the men's National Hockey League, a field hockey tournament hosted by the Australian Hockey Association. The tournament was held across various cities in Australia, from 23 February to 1 April 2001.

The NSW Panthers won their second title, defeating the Perth Thundersticks 3–2 in the final.

== Participating teams ==
Teams from each of Australia's eight states and territories competed in the league.

- (South Australia) Adelaide Hotshots
- (Australian Capital Territory) Canberra Lakers
- (Victoria (state)) Melbourne Redbacks
- (New South Wales) NSW Panthers
- (Western Australia) Perth Thundersticks
- (Queensland) QLD Blades
- (Tasmania) Tassie Tigers
- (Northern Territory) Territory Stingers

== Venues ==
Sydney	Melbourne	Perth
NSW State Hockey Centre	Victorian Netball and Hockey Centre	Perth Hockey Stadium
Capacity: 8,000	Capacity: 8,000	Capacity: 6,000
Adelaide	2001 Men's National Hockey League is located in Australia	
Pines Hockey Stadium	2001 Men's National Hockey League is located in Australia	
Capacity: 4,000	2001 Men's National Hockey League is located in Australia	
Brisbane	2001 Men's National Hockey League is located in Australia	
Queensland State Hockey Centre	2001 Men's National Hockey League is located in Australia	
Capacity: 1,000	2001 Men's National Hockey League is located in Australia	
Canberra	Hobart	Darwin
National Hockey Centre	Tasmanian Hockey Centre	Marrara Hockey Centre

== Preliminary round ==
=== Pool ===
Pos	Team	Pld	W	WD	LD	L	GF	GA	GD	Pts	Qualification
1	(New South Wales) NSW Panthers	11	7	2	1	1	54	28	+26	31	Medal round
2	(Queensland) QLD Blades	11	6	2	1	2	36	20	+16	31	Medal round
3	(Western Australia) Perth Thundersticks	11	6	1	2	2	43	31	+12	29	Medal round
4	(Tasmania) Tassie Tigers	11	6	2	0	3	38	31	+7	28	Medal round
5	(Victoria (state)) Melbourne Redbacks	11	5	0	2	4	49	37	+12	24	Classification round
6	(Australian Capital Territory) Canberra Lakers	11	4	0	1	6	25	41	−16	16	Classification round
7	(South Australia) Adelaide Hotshots	11	2	0	0	9	28	55	−27	6	Classification round
8	(Northern Territory) Territory Stingers	11	1	0	0	10	14	44	−30	3	Classification round

Source: Hockey Australia

=== Fixtures ===
23 February 2001
19:00 (AEDT)

Tassie Tigers (Tasmania)	6–3	(South Australia) Adelaide Hotshots
Sproule 3'; Richardson 8'; Guest 25'; Marshall 51'; Burrows 52'; Wells 58'	Report	Schubert 35'; Victory 60'; Telfer 70'

Tasmanian Hockey Centre, Hobart

24 February 2001
14:30 (AEDT)

NSW Panthers (New South Wales)	3–2	(Queensland) QLD Blades
Nilan 13'; McCann 15'; Sutherland 66'	Report	Eglington 2'; Bodimeade 13'

NSW State Hockey Centre, Sydney

24 February 2001
15:00 (AEDT)

Melbourne Redbacks (Victoria (state))	2–4	(Western Australia) Perth Thundersticks
McLennan 48'; Dawson 53'	Report	Woodhouse 14'; Kirkaldy 62'; Webster 66'; Davison 69'

Victorian Netball and Hockey Centre, Melbourne

24 February 2001
18:00 (AEDT)

Tassie Tigers (Tasmania)	2–0	(South Australia) Adelaide Hotshots
Canny 37'; Wright 41'	Report

Tasmanian Hockey Centre, Hobart

24 February 2001
19:00 (ACST)

Territory Stingers (Northern Territory)	2–1	(Australian Capital Territory) Canberra Lakers
Keirs 48'; Regan 53'	Report	Taylor 69'

Marrara Hockey Centre, Darwin

25 February 2001
13:30 (AEDT)

NSW Panthers (New South Wales)	3–3 (a.e.t.)	(Queensland) QLD Blades
McCann 10'; Sutherland 26'; Commens 37'	Report	O'Shea 2', 63'; Bisley 59'
Penalties
	2–1

NSW State Hockey Centre, Sydney

25 February 2001
15:00 (AEDT)

Melbourne Redbacks (Victoria (state))	2–4	(Western Australia) Perth Thundersticks
Davis 15'; Vivian-Taylor 35'	Report	Woodhouse 5', 22', 36'; Bolton 55'

Victorian Netball and Hockey Centre, Melbourne

25 February 2001
19:00 (ACST)

Territory Stingers (Northern Territory)	1–3	(Australian Capital Territory) Canberra Lakers
King 6'	Report	Dawson 39'; Taylor 40', 60'

Marrara Hockey Centre, Darwin

2 March 2001
17:30 (AEDT)

Canberra Lakers (Australian Capital Territory)	6–5	(Tasmania) Tassie Tigers
Z. Hawes 12', 53'; Gilson 19', 25'; J. Hawes 35'; Taylor 62'	Report	Burrows 9'; Guest 29', 40'; Richardson 34'; Wells 68'

National Hockey Centre, Canberra

3 March 2001
13:00 (ACDT)

Adelaide Hotshots (South Australia)	3–2	(Northern Territory) Territory Stingers
Edwards 34'; Schubert 57'; Abbott 63'	Report	Keirs 3'; Regan 59'

Pines Hockey Stadium, Adelaide

3 March 2001
15:00 (AEST)

QLD Blades (Queensland)	3–2	(Victoria (state)) Melbourne Redbacks
Dwyer 29', 36', 60'	Report	D. Duff 58'; Vivian-Taylor 67'

Queensland State Hockey Centre, Brisbane

3 March 2001
18:00 (AWST)

Perth Thundersticks (Western Australia)	3–2 (a.e.t.)	(New South Wales) NSW Panthers
Carruthers 30'; Kirkaldy 65'; Woodhouse 74'	Report	Sutherland 25'; Nilan 33'

Perth Hockey Stadium, Perth

3 March 2001
19:00 (AEDT)

Canberra Lakers (Australian Capital Territory)	1–2 (a.e.t.)	(Tasmania) Tassie Tigers
Bissett 64'	Report	Guest 13', 76'

National Hockey Centre, Canberra

4 March 2001
13:00 (ACDT)

Adelaide Hotshots (South Australia)	5–2	(Northern Territory) Territory Stingers
Abbott 23'; Schmarr 33'; Pannell 36'; Schubert 44', 52'	Report	Sharp 56'; O'Brien 62'

Pines Hockey Stadium, Adelaide

4 March 2001
15:00 (AEST)

QLD Blades (Queensland)	4–3 (a.e.t.)	(Victoria (state)) Melbourne Redbacks
Eglington 20', 55'; Dwyer 23', 72'	Report	Thompson 27'; Trounce 38'; Doerner 65'

Queensland State Hockey Centre, Brisbane

4 March 2001
16:00 (AWST)

Perth Thundersticks (Western Australia)	2–6	(New South Wales) NSW Panthers
Carruthers 53'; Gaudoin 53'	Report	McCann 2', 12', 39', 63'; Oman 21'; Harris 70'

Perth Hockey Stadium, Perth

9 March 2001
19:00 (AEDT)

Tassie Tigers (Tasmania)	4–1	(Queensland) QLD Blades
Guest 19'; Burrows 22'; Canny 31'; Corney 42'	Report	Eglington 1'

Tasmanian Hockey Centre, Hobart

10 March 2001
14:30 (AEDT)

NSW Panthers (New South Wales)	10–3	(South Australia) Adelaide Hotshots
Commens 6', 39', 43'; Nilan 24', 33', 52'; Charlton 27'; Hogan 28'; Oman 58'; Dalrymple 61'	Report	Kelly 10', 45'; Stephen 36'

Western Sydney International Hockey Centre, Sydney

10 March 2001
15:00 (AEDT)

Melbourne Redbacks (Victoria (state))	3–4	(Australian Capital Territory) Canberra Lakers
Vivian-Taylor 8', 17', 34'	Report	J. Hawes 24', 36', 39', 55'

Victorian Netball and Hockey Centre, Melbourne

10 March 2001
17:30 (AEDT)

Tassie Tigers (Tasmania)	1–4	(Queensland) QLD Blades
Burrows 22'	Report	Dwyer 6', 35'; O'Shea 11'; Mangan 61'

Tasmanian Hockey Centre, Hobart

10 March 2001
19:00 (ACST)

Territory Stingers (Northern Territory)	1–4	(Western Australia) Perth Thundersticks
Regan 58'	Report	Gaudoin 2'; Davison 16', 53'; McIntyre 62'

Marrara Hockey Centre, Darwin

11 March 2001
13:30 (AEDT)

NSW Panthers (New South Wales)	6–2	(South Australia) Adelaide Hotshots
Hogan 10', 42'; Nilan 16'; Gilbert 16'; Commens 21'; McCann 48'	Report	Victory 24'; Kelly 29'

Western Sydney International Hockey Centre, Sydney

11 March 2001
15:00 (AEDT)

Melbourne Redbacks (Victoria (state))	8–1	(Australian Capital Territory) Canberra Lakers
D. Duff 4', 59'; Hiskins 8', 46'; Vivian-Taylor 31', 35'; Smith 38'; Trounce 68'	Report	Gilson 19'

Victorian Netball and Hockey Centre, Melbourne

11 March 2001
19:00 (ACST)

Territory Stingers (Northern Territory)	0–6	(Western Australia) Perth Thundersticks
	Report	McIntyre 10', 18'; Choppy 11'; Carruthers 32', 68'; Gaudoin 63'

Marrara Hockey Centre, Darwin

16 March 2001
18:00 (AEDT)

Canberra Lakers (Australian Capital Territory)	1–3	(New South Wales) NSW Panthers
Spokes 10'	Report	Commens 26'; Oman 32'; Gilbert 48'

National Hockey Centre, Canberra

16 March 2001
20:00 (AWST)

Perth Thundersticks (Western Australia)	3–4	(Tasmania) Tassie Tigers
McIntyre 33'; Kirkaldy 45'; Gaudoin 52'	Report	Marshall 22'; Canny 39', 40', 42'

Perth Hockey Stadium, Perth

17 March 2001
15:00 (ACDT)

Adelaide Hotshots (South Australia)	4–8	(Victoria (state)) Melbourne Redbacks
Edwards 18'; Victory 43'; Schubert 47'; Stephen 51'	Report	Smith 3', 53', 59'; Vivian-Taylor 9', 21'; Hiskins 19', 68'; McLennan 55'

Pines Hockey Stadium, Adelaide

17 March 2001
17:00 (AEST)

QLD Blades (Queensland)	2–0	(Northern Territory) Territory Stingers
Dancer 41', 58'	Report

Queensland State Hockey Centre, Brisbane

17 March 2001
18:00 (AEDT)

Canberra Lakers (Australian Capital Territory)	1–5	(New South Wales) NSW Panthers
L. MacKinnon 52'	Report	Charlton 23'; Commens 29'; Harris 38'; McCann 52'; Hogan 69'

National Hockey Centre, Canberra

17 March 2001
20:00 (AWST)

Perth Thundersticks (Western Australia)	3–4 (a.e.t.)	(Tasmania) Tassie Tigers
Carruthers 3'; Hopkins 20'; Davison 68'	Report	Marshall 9', 22'; Burrows 15', 77'

Perth Hockey Stadium, Perth

18 March 2001
15:00 (ACDT)

Adelaide Hotshots (South Australia)	1–3	(Victoria (state)) Melbourne Redbacks
Kelly 44'	Report	Smith 14'; Thompson 15'; Vivian-Taylor 41'

Pines Hockey Stadium, Adelaide

18 March 2001
17:00 (AEST)

QLD Blades (Queensland)	3–0	(Northern Territory) Territory Stingers
O'Shea 19'; Dwyer 30'; Brown 70'	Report

Queensland State Hockey Centre, Brisbane

27 March 2001
10:15 (AEST)

Tassie Tigers (Tasmania)	3–1	(Northern Territory) Territory Stingers
Richardson 19', 41'; Park 39'	Report	Keirs 8'

National Hockey Centre, Canberra

27 March 2001
12:30 (AEST)

Melbourne Redbacks (Victoria (state))	5–6 (a.e.t.)	(New South Wales) NSW Panthers
Smith 34'; Doerner 41'; Trounce 55'; Hiskins 55'; McLennan 67'	Report	Gilbert 23', 45'; Livermore 31', 53'; Oman 64'; Smith 81'

National Hockey Centre, Canberra

27 March 2001
15:45 (AEST)

Perth Thundersticks (Western Australia)	3–4 (a.e.t.)	(Queensland) QLD Blades
Carruthers 7', 48'; Choppy 54'	Report	Elder 15', 59'; O'Shea 23'; M. Brennan 81'

National Hockey Centre, Canberra

27 March 2001
18:00 (AEST)

Adelaide Hotshots (South Australia)	3–4	(Australian Capital Territory) Canberra Lakers
Kelly 10'; Abbott 37'; Schubert 48'	Report	Z. Hawes 10', 66'; Dawson 22'; Gilson 30'

National Hockey Centre, Canberra

28 March 2001
10:15 (AEST)

Melbourne Redbacks (Victoria (state))	6–2	(Tasmania) Tassie Tigers
McLennan 2'; Thompson 22', 61'; Doerner 36'; Vivian-Taylor 37'; Trounce 65'	Report	Wells 20'; Richardson 70'

National Hockey Centre, Canberra

28 March 2001
12:30 (AEST)

NSW Panthers (New South Wales)	7–1	(Northern Territory) Territory Stingers
McCann 6', 20', 45', 53'; King 15'; Garard 34'; Sutherland 68'	Report	Sharp 35'

National Hockey Centre, Canberra

28 March 2001
15:15 (AEST)

Perth Thundersticks (Western Australia)	8–4	(South Australia) Adelaide Hotshots
Choppy 6'; Davison 12', 41', 57'; Carruthers 34', 56'; Webster 46'; McIntyre 61'	Report	Schubert 5', 68'; Kelly 29'; Davy 49'

National Hockey Centre, Canberra

28 March 2001
17:30 (AEST)

QLD Blades (Queensland)	6–1	(Australian Capital Territory) Canberra Lakers
Elder 23'; M. Brennan 25'; Dwyer 37', 42', 52'; O'Shea 70'	Report	Z. Hawes 56'

National Hockey Centre, Canberra

29 March 2001
09:45 (AEST)

Territory Stingers (Northern Territory)	4–7	(Victoria (state)) Melbourne Redbacks
Regan 21', 47'; O'Brien 48'; Keirs 63'	Report	D. Duff 10'; Hiskins 16', 26', 34', 44'; Vivian-Taylor 45'; Smith 61'

National Hockey Centre, Canberra

29 March 2001
12:00 (AEST)

NSW Panthers (New South Wales)	3–5	(Tasmania) Tassie Tigers
Commens 7'; Oman 19'; Vimpani 31'	Report	Wells 23'; Burrows 34', 46', 53'; Guest 49'

National Hockey Centre, Canberra

29 March 2001
14:15 (AEST)

Canberra Lakers (Australian Capital Territory)	2–3	(Western Australia) Perth Thundersticks
Gilson 31'; Dawson 45'	Report	Davison 31', 64', 65'

National Hockey Centre, Canberra

29 March 2001
16:30 (AEST)

QLD Blades (Queensland)	4–0	(South Australia) Adelaide Hotshots
Eglington 6', 25'; Elder 37'; Bodimeade 48'	Report

National Hockey Centre, Canberra

== Classification round ==
=== Bracket ===
Crossovers
31 March 2001
(Victoria (state)) Melbourne Redbacks	2
(Northern Territory) Territory Stingers	1
31 March 2001
(Australian Capital Territory) Canberra Lakers	6
(South Australia) Adelaide Hotshots	2

Fifth place
1 April 2001
(Victoria (state)) Melbourne Redbacks	6
(Australian Capital Territory) Canberra Lakers	1
Seventh place
1 April 2001
(Northern Territory) Territory Stingers	3
(South Australia) Adelaide Hotshots	2

=== Crossovers ===
31 March 2001
08:30 (AEST)

Canberra Lakers (Australian Capital Territory)	6–2	(South Australia) Adelaide Hotshots
Judge 8', 41', 45', 60', 70'; Spokes 38'	Report	Kelly 3'; Stephen 45'

National Hockey Centre, Canberra

31 March 2001
10:30 (AEST)

Melbourne Redbacks (Victoria (state))	2–1	(Northern Territory) Territory Stingers
Smith 3'; Vivian-Taylor 64'	Report	Holt 4'

National Hockey Centre, Canberra

=== Seventh and eighth place ===
1 April 2001
08:30 (AEST)

Territory Stingers (Northern Territory)	3–2	(South Australia) Adelaide Hotshots
Sharp 32'; Keirs 50'; Black 56'	Report	Schubert 59'; Kelly 67'

National Hockey Centre, Canberra

=== Fifth and sixth place ===
1 April 2001
10:30 (AEST)

Melbourne Redbacks (Victoria (state))	6–1	(Australian Capital Territory) Canberra Lakers
Hiskins 4', 51'; D. Duff 18', 20'; Thompson 21'; Smith 59'	Report	J. Hawes 68'

National Hockey Centre, Canberra

== Medal round ==
=== Bracket ===
Semi-finals
31 March 2001
(New South Wales) NSW Panthers	4
(Tasmania) Tassie Tigers	3
31 March 2001
(Queensland) QLD Blades	0
(Western Australia) Perth Thundersticks	1

Final
1 April 2001
(New South Wales) NSW Panthers	3
(Western Australia) Perth Thundersticks	2
Third place
1 April 2001
(Tasmania) Tassie Tigers	2
(Queensland) QLD Blades	5

=== Semi-finals ===
31 March 2001
12:30 (AEST)

NSW Panthers (New South Wales)	4–3	(Tasmania) Tassie Tigers
Smith 3', 46'; King 45'; Gilbert 60'	Report	Burrows 22'; Marshall 29'; Guest 55'

National Hockey Centre, Canberra

31 March 2001
14:30 (AEST)

QLD Blades (Queensland)	0–1	(Western Australia) Perth Thundersticks
	Report	Choppy 62'

National Hockey Centre, Canberra

=== Third and fourth place ===
1 April 2001
12:30 (AEST)

Tassie Tigers (Tasmania)	2–5	(Queensland) QLD Blades
Richardson 1'; Wells 9'	Report	M. Brennan 17'; Eglington 18', 31', 33'; Bodimeade 52'

National Hockey Centre, Canberra

=== Final ===
1 April 2001
14:30 (AEST)

NSW Panthers (New South Wales)	3–2	(Western Australia) Perth Thundersticks
Livermore 27'; McCann 47'; Oman 58'	Report	Carruthers 28'; Kirkaldy 63'

National Hockey Centre, Canberra

== Final standings ==
Pos	Team	Pld	W	WD	LD	L	GF	GA	GD	Pts	Qualification
1st place, gold medalist(s)	(New South Wales) NSW Panthers	13	9	2	1	1	61	33	+28	37	Gold Medal
2nd place, silver medalist(s)	(Western Australia) Perth Thundersticks	13	7	1	2	3	46	34	+12	32	Silver Medal
3rd place, bronze medalist(s)	(Queensland) QLD Blades	13	7	2	1	3	41	23	+18	34	Bronze Medal
4	(Tasmania) Tassie Tigers	13	6	2	0	5	43	40	+3	28	
5	(Victoria (state)) Melbourne Redbacks	13	7	0	2	4	57	39	+18	30	
6	(Australian Capital Territory) Canberra Lakers	13	5	0	1	7	32	49	−17	19	
7	(Northern Territory) Territory Stingers	13	2	0	0	11	18	48	−30	6	
8	(South Australia) Adelaide Hotshots	13	2	0	0	11	32	64	−32	6	

Source: Clearing House

== Goalscorers ==
There were 330 goals scored in 52 matches, for an average of 6.35 goals per match.

13 goals

- (Victoria (state)) Lachlan Vivian-Taylor
- (New South Wales) Michael McCann

11 goals

- (Victoria (state)) Jeremy Hiskins
- (Queensland) Jamie Dwyer

10 goals

- (Western Australia) Stuart Carruthers
- (Western Australia) Daniel Davison
- (Tasmania) Phillip Burrows

9 goals

- (South Australia) Grant Schubert
- (Victoria (state)) Andrew Smith
- (Queensland) Nathan Eglington

8 goals

- (South Australia) Daniel Kelly
- (New South Wales) Adam Commens
- (Tasmania) David Guest

6 goals

- (Australian Capital Territory) Joshua Hawes
- (Victoria (state)) Darren Duff
- (New South Wales) Nathan Gilbert
- (New South Wales) Aaron Nilan
- (Queensland) Justin O'Shea
- (Tasmania) Marcus Richardson

5 goals

- (Australian Capital Territory) Evan Gilson
- (Australian Capital Territory) Zachary Hawes
- (Australian Capital Territory) Lucas Judge
- (Victoria (state)) Brett Thompson
- (New South Wales) Aaron Oman
- (Western Australia) Murray McIntyre
- (Western Australia) Tristram Woodhouse
- (Tasmania) Scott Canny
- (Tasmania) Phillip Marshall
- (Tasmania) Matthew Wells
- (Northern Territory) Matthew Regan
- (Northern Territory) Daniel Keirs

4 goals

- (Australian Capital Territory) Benjamin Taylor
- (Victoria (state)) Alistair McLennan
- (Victoria (state)) Michael Trounce
- (New South Wales) Michael Hogan
- (New South Wales) Troy Sutherland
- (Western Australia) Baeden Choppy
- (Western Australia) Paul Gaudoin
- (Western Australia) Iain Kirkaldy
- (Queensland) Troy Elder

3 goals

- (South Australia) Gregory Abbott
- (South Australia) Dale Stephen
- (South Australia) Craig Victory
- (Australian Capital Territory) Dean Dawson
- (Victoria (state)) Luke Doerner
- (New South Wales) Brent Livermore
- (New South Wales) Matthew Smith
- (Queensland) Lee Bodimeade
- (Queensland) Michael Brennan
- (Northern Territory) Baden Sharp

2 goals

- (South Australia) Benjamin Edwards
- (Australian Capital Territory) Luke Spokes
- (New South Wales) Ronald Charlton
- (New South Wales) Mark Harris
- (New South Wales) Benjamin King
- (Western Australia) Scott Webster
- (Queensland) Sean Dancer
- (Northern Territory) Edward O'Brien

1 goal

- (South Australia) Jeremy Davy
- (South Australia) Nicholas Pannell
- (South Australia) David Schmarr
- (South Australia) William Telfer
- (Australian Capital Territory) Martin Bissett
- (Australian Capital Territory) Luke MacKinnon
- (Victoria (state)) Gavin Davis
- (Victoria (state)) Daniel Dawson
- (New South Wales) Shane Dalrymple
- (New South Wales) Brendan Garard
- (New South Wales) Simon Vimpani
- (Western Australia) Guy Bolton
- (Western Australia) Aaron Hopkins
- (Queensland) Darren Bisley
- (Queensland) Blair Brown
- (Queensland) Jason Mangan
- (Tasmania) Joshua Corney
- (Tasmania) Michael Park
- (Tasmania) Daniel Sproule
- (Tasmania) Zain Wright
- (Northern Territory) Jason Black
- (Northern Territory) Stephen Holt
- (Northern Territory) Wayne King
