= 2000 Men's National Hockey League =

Tournament details
- Host country: Australia
- City: Sydney
- Dates: 20 June – 2 July
- Teams: 9
- Venue: Sydney Olympic Park

Final positions
- Champions: (Western Australia) Perth Thundersticks (5th title)
- Runner-up: (New South Wales) NSW Warriors
- Third place: (Queensland) QLD Blades

Tournament statistics
- Matches played: 35
- Goals scored: 187 (5.34 per match)
- Top scorer(s): (Queensland) Stephen Davies (Tasmania) Craig Keegan (10 goals)
- Best player: (New South Wales) Brent Livermore

The 2000 Men's National Hockey League was the 9th edition of the men's National Hockey League, a field hockey tournament hosted by the Australian Hockey Association. The tournament was held at Sydney Olympic Park in Sydney, Australia, from 20 June to 2 July 2000.

The Perth Thundersticks won the title for the fifth time, defeating the NSW Warriors 2–1 in the final. The QLD Blades took third place over the Melbourne Redbacks, with an 8–7 victory in penalties after the third place match finished 3–3.

This was the last edition of the tournament to feature the North Queensland Barras.

== Participating teams ==
- (South Australia) Adelaide Hotshots
- (Australian Capital Territory) Canberra Lakers
- (Victoria (state)) Melbourne Redbacks
- North Queensland Barras
- (New South Wales) NSW Warriors
- (Western Australia) Perth Thundersticks
- (Queensland) QLD Blades
- (Tasmania) Tassie Tigers
- (Northern Territory) Territory Stingers

== Competition format ==
The 2000 Men's National Hockey League consisted of a single round robin format, followed by classification matches.

== Preliminary round ==
All times are local (AEST).

=== Pool ===
Pos	Team	Pld	W	D	L	GF	GA	GD	Pts	Qualification
1	(Western Australia) Perth Thundersticks	6	6	0	0	25	4	+21	18	Medal round
2	(Queensland) QLD Blades	6	5	0	1	19	5	+14	15	Medal round
3	(New South Wales) NSW Warriors (H)	6	4	1	1	26	10	+16	13	Medal round
4	(Victoria (state)) Melbourne Redbacks	6	4	1	1	20	9	+11	13	Medal round
5	North Queensland Barras	6	3	1	2	17	16	+1	10	Classification round
6	(Tasmania) Tassie Tigers	6	2	0	4	12	23	−11	6	Classification round
7	(Northern Territory) Territory Stingers	6	1	0	5	5	19	−14	3	Classification round
8	(Australian Capital Territory) Canberra Lakers	6	0	1	5	8	21	−13	1	Classification round
9	(South Australia) Adelaide Hotshots	6	0	0	6	8	33	−25	0	Classification round

Source: Government of Australia
(H) Hosts

=== Fixtures ===
20 June 2000
11:00

QLD Blades (Queensland)	5–1	(Northern Territory) Territory Stingers
S. Brennan 23'; M. Brennan 31', 67'; Elder 46'; Dwyer 57'	Report	Hogan 56'

Sydney Olympic Park, Sydney

20 June 2000
13:00

Adelaide Hotshots (South Australia)	0–5	(Western Australia) Perth Thundersticks
	Report	Carruthers 3'; Gibson 16'; Webster 19'; McIntyre 46', 49'

Sydney Olympic Park, Sydney

20 June 2000
15:00

North Queensland Barras	2–2	(Victoria (state)) Melbourne Redbacks
Davies 10'; Deuble 38'	Report	Woolsey 17'; Hiskins 50'

Sydney Olympic Park, Sydney

21 June 2000
11:00

NSW Warriors (New South Wales)	7–1	(South Australia) Adelaide Hotshots
McCann 10', 27'; Taylor 17'; Mayo 25', 60'; Livermore 59'; Commens 65'	Report	Schubert 3'

Sydney Olympic Park, Sydney

21 June 2000
13:00

Tassie Tigers (Tasmania)	1–4	North Queensland Barras
Lucas 29'	Report	Davies 11', 20'; Towns 33'; Stacy 68'

Sydney Olympic Park, Sydney

21 June 2000
15:00

Territory Stingers (Northern Territory)	2–1	(Australian Capital Territory) Canberra Lakers
Hogan 42'; Regan 48'	Report	L. MacKinnon 20'

Sydney Olympic Park, Sydney

22 June 2000
16:00

Melbourne Redbacks (Victoria (state))	6–2	(Tasmania) Tassie Tigers
Vivian-Taylor 15', 19', 35'; T. Brooks 23', 38'; Hiskins 39'	Report	Keegan 36', 63'

Sydney Olympic Park, Sydney

22 June 2000
18:00

Canberra Lakers (Australian Capital Territory)	0–2	(Queensland) QLD Blades
	Report	Dwyer 20', 43'

Sydney Olympic Park, Sydney

22 June 2000
20:00

Perth Thundersticks (Western Australia)	3–2	(New South Wales) NSW Warriors
Choppy 6', 26'; Gaudoin 60'	Report	McCann 53'; Taylor 69'

Sydney Olympic Park, Sydney

23 June 2000
16:00

QLD Blades (Queensland)	5–1	(South Australia) Adelaide Hotshots
S. Brennan 16'; M. Brennan 31'; Richards 34'; Elder 46', 67'	Report	Galvin 43'

Sydney Olympic Park, Sydney

23 June 2000
18:00

Tassie Tigers (Tasmania)	1–3	(Western Australia) Perth Thundersticks
Keegan 46'	Report	Gaudoin 29'; Woodhouse 47'; M. Boyce 50'

Sydney Olympic Park, Sydney

23 June 2000
20:00

Melbourne Redbacks (Victoria (state))	5–0	(Australian Capital Territory) Canberra Lakers
Hiskins 6', 7'; Vivian-Taylor 35', 51'; Henderson 65'	Report

Sydney Olympic Park, Sydney

25 June 2000
11:00

Territory Stingers (Northern Territory)	1–2	(Tasmania) Tassie Tigers
Hogan 62'	Report	Wells 11'; Keegan 43'

Sydney Olympic Park, Sydney

25 June 2000
13:00

Canberra Lakers (Australian Capital Territory)	5–5	(New South Wales) NSW Warriors
Hotchkis 11'; Kelly 13'; Taylor 14', 62'; Dawson 19'	Report	Mayo 3'; Livermore 22', 51'; Oman 29'; Commens 43'

Sydney Olympic Park, Sydney

25 June 2000
15:00

Adelaide Hotshots (South Australia)	1–5	North Queensland Barras
Victory 5'	Report	Davies 12', 40', 62'; Stacy 31'; Bodimeade 65'

Sydney Olympic Park, Sydney

26 June 2000
11:00

NSW Warriors (New South Wales)	3–1	(Victoria (state)) Melbourne Redbacks
Charlton 5'; Taylor 32'; Livermore 54'	Report	Vivian-Taylor 34'

Sydney Olympic Park, Sydney

26 June 2000
13:00

North Queensland Barras	1–4	(Queensland) QLD Blades
Deuble 13'	Report	M. Brennan 5'; Elder 17', 35', 42'

Sydney Olympic Park, Sydney

26 June 2000
15:00

Perth Thundersticks (Western Australia)	5–0	(Northern Territory) Territory Stingers
Gaudoin 8'; Choppy 10', 19', 37'; George 63'	Report

Sydney Olympic Park, Sydney

27 June 2000
11:00

Territory Stingers (Northern Territory)	0–2	(Queensland) QLD Blades
	Report	Richards 26'; Elder 51'

Sydney Olympic Park, Sydney

27 June 2000
13:00

Perth Thundersticks (Western Australia)	2–1	(Australian Capital Territory) Canberra Lakers
McIntyre 42'; Woodhouse 58'	Report	L. MacKinnon 65'

Sydney Olympic Park, Sydney

27 June 2000
15:00

NSW Warriors (New South Wales)	5–0	(South Australia) Adelaide Hotshots
Taylor 20', 28', 30'; Commens 21'; Harris 35'	Report

Sydney Olympic Park, Sydney

28 June 2000
11:00

Canberra Lakers (Australian Capital Territory)	1–5	North Queensland Barras
Bishop 33'	Report	Bisley 6'; O'Shea 12'; Davies 42', 63'; Stacy 65'

Sydney Olympic Park, Sydney

28 June 2000
13:00

Adelaide Hotshots (South Australia)	5–6	(Tasmania) Tassie Tigers
Johnson 16', 60'; Victory 34'; Meredith 40', 61'	Report	Keegan 12', 17', 26', 46', 51', 56'

Sydney Olympic Park, Sydney

28 June 2000
15:00

Melbourne Redbacks (Victoria (state))	4–1	(Northern Territory) Territory Stingers
Vivian-Taylor 1', 3', 26'; Hiskins 68'	Report	Hogan 42'

Sydney Olympic Park, Sydney

29 June 2000
16:00

Tassie Tigers (Tasmania)	0–4	(New South Wales) NSW Warriors
	Report	Taylor 12'; Livermore 18'; Gilbert 43'; Wark 66'

Sydney Olympic Park, Sydney

29 June 2000
18:00

QLD Blades (Queensland)	1–2	(Victoria (state)) Melbourne Redbacks
M. Brennan 51'	Report	T. Brooks 39', 55'

Sydney Olympic Park, Sydney

29 June 2000
20:00

North Queensland Barras	0–7	(Western Australia) Perth Thundersticks
	Report	McIntyre 31', 43', 52'; Kirkaldy 41', 41'; Robbins 47'; Webster 67'

Sydney Olympic Park, Sydney

== Classification round ==
The fifth place team from the preliminary round received an automatic berth to the fifth place match.

=== Bracket ===
Crossover
30 June 2000
(Tasmania) Tassie Tigers	1
(Northern Territory) Territory Stingers (a.e.t)	2
30 June 2000
(Australian Capital Territory) Canberra Lakers	4
(South Australia) Adelaide Hotshots	1

Fifth place
2 July 2000
North Queensland Barras	6
(Northern Territory) Territory Stingers	4
Seventh place
2 July 2000
(Tasmania) Tassie Tigers	7
(Australian Capital Territory) Canberra Lakers	2

=== Crossovers ===
30 June 2000
14:00

Canberra Lakers (Australian Capital Territory)	4–1	(South Australia) Adelaide Hotshots
Bisset 9'; Dawson 13'; J. Hawes 20'; Taylor 20'	Report	Meredith 31'

Sydney Olympic Park, Sydney

30 June 2000
16:00

Tassie Tigers (Tasmania)	1–2 (a.e.t.)	(Northern Territory) Territory Stingers
Wright 50'	Report	Regan 63'; Butcher 83'

Sydney Olympic Park, Sydney

=== Seventh and eighth place ===
2 July 2000
09:00

Tassie Tigers (Tasmania)	7–2	(Australian Capital Territory) Canberra Lakers
Williams 29'; Wells 33', 63'; Wright 41'; Close 41', 50', 51'	Report	Taylor 27'; Dawson 58'

Sydney Olympic Park, Sydney

=== Fifth and sixth place ===
2 July 2000
11:00

North Queensland Barras	6–4	(Northern Territory) Territory Stingers
Stacy 2'; Davies 26', 28'; Bisley 35'; O'Shea 47'; Deuble 56'	Report	Holt 12', 57', 70'; Regan 51'

Sydney Olympic Park, Sydney

== Medal round ==
=== Bracket ===
Semi-finals
30 June 2000
(Western Australia) Perth Thundersticks	4
(Victoria (state)) Melbourne Redbacks	2
30 June 2000
(Queensland) QLD Blades	1
(New South Wales) NSW Warriors	4

Final
2 July 2000
(Western Australia) Perth Thundersticks	2
(New South Wales) NSW Warriors	1
Third place
2 July 2000
(Victoria (state)) Melbourne Redbacks	3 (7)
(Queensland) QLD Blades (pen.)	3 (8)

=== Semi-finals ===
30 June 2000
18:00

Perth Thundersticks (Western Australia)	4–2	(Victoria (state)) Melbourne Redbacks
Webster 13'; Woodhouse 27'; Gaudoin 29'; George 51'	Report	T. Brooks 22'; Hiskins 38'

Sydney Olympic Park, Sydney

30 June 2000
20:00

QLD Blades (Queensland)	1–4	(New South Wales) NSW Warriors
Elder 33'	Report	Taylor 39'; Livermore 42'; McCann 44'; Smith 66'

Sydney Olympic Park, Sydney

=== Third and fourth place ===
2 July 2000
13:00

QLD Blades (Queensland)	3–3 (a.e.t.)	(Victoria (state)) Melbourne Redbacks
S. Brennan 12'; Elder 17'; Eglington 51'	Report	T. Brooks 21'; Manos 27'; Smith 53'
Penalties
	8–7

Sydney Olympic Park, Sydney

=== Final ===
2 July 2000
15:00

Perth Thundersticks (Western Australia)	2–1	(New South Wales) NSW Warriors
Choppy 8', 23'	Report	Smith 60'

Sydney Olympic Park, Sydney

== Awards ==
The following awards were presented at the conclusion of the tournament.

Top Goalscorers	Player of the League
(Queensland) Stephen Davies (Barras) (Tasmania) Craig Keegan	(New South Wales) Brent Livermore

== Final standings ==
Pos	Team	Pld	W	D	L	GF	GA	GD	Pts	Final Result
1st place, gold medalist(s)	(Western Australia) Perth Thundersticks	8	8	0	0	31	7	+24	24	Gold Medal
2nd place, silver medalist(s)	(New South Wales) NSW Warriors (H)	8	5	1	2	31	13	+18	16	Silver Medal
3rd place, bronze medalist(s)	(Queensland) QLD Blades	8	5	1	2	23	12	+11	16	Bronze Medal
4	(Victoria (state)) Melbourne Redbacks	8	4	2	2	25	16	+9	14	
5	North Queensland Barras	7	4	1	2	23	20	+3	13	
6	(Northern Territory) Territory Stingers	8	2	0	6	11	26	−15	6	
7	(Tasmania) Tassie Tigers	8	3	0	5	20	27	−7	9	
8	(Australian Capital Territory) Canberra Lakers	8	1	1	6	14	29	−15	4	
9	(South Australia) Adelaide Hotshots	7	0	0	7	9	37	−28	0	

Source: Government of Australia
(H) Hosts

== Goalscorers ==
There were 187 goals scored in 35 matches, for an average of 5.34 goals per match.

10 goals

- (Queensland) Stephen Davies (Barras)
- (Tasmania) Craig Keegan

9 goals

- (Victoria (state)) Lachlan Vivian-Taylor
- (Queensland) Troy Elder (Blades)

8 goals

- (New South Wales) Peter Taylor

7 goals

- (Western Australia) Baeden Choppy

6 goals

- (Victoria (state)) Travis Brooks
- (Victoria (state)) Jeremy Hiskins
- (New South Wales) Brent Livermore
- (Western Australia) Murray McIntyre

5 goals

- (Queensland) Michael Brennan (Blades)

4 goals

- (Australian Capital Territory) Benjamin Taylor
- (Queensland) Jay Stacy (Barras)
- (New South Wales) Michael McCann
- (Western Australia) Paul Gaudoin
- (Northern Territory) Michael Hogan

3 goals

- (South Australia) Andrew Meredith
- (Australian Capital Territory) Dean Dawson
- (Queensland) Glen Deuble (Barras)
- (New South Wales) Adam Commens
- (New South Wales) Steven Mayo
- (Western Australia) Scott Webster
- (Western Australia) Tristram Woodhouse
- (Queensland) Scott Brennan (Blades)
- (Queensland) Jamie Dwyer (Blades)
- (Tasmania) Oliver Close
- (Tasmania) Matthew Wells
- (Northern Territory) Stephen Holt
- (Northern Territory) Matthew Regan

2 goals

- (South Australia) Marc Johnson
- (South Australia) Craig Victory
- (Australian Capital Territory) Luke MacKinnon
- (Queensland) Darren Bisley (Barras)
- (Queensland) Justin O'Shea (Barras)
- (New South Wales) Matthew Smith
- (Western Australia) Bevan George
- (Western Australia) Iain Kirkaldy
- (Queensland) Murray Richards (Blades)
- (Tasmania) Zain Wright

1 goal

- (South Australia) David Galvin
- (South Australia) Grant Schubert
- (Australian Capital Territory) Benjamin Bishop
- (Australian Capital Territory) Martin Bissett
- (Australian Capital Territory) Joshua Hawes
- (Australian Capital Territory) Matthew Hotchkis
- (Australian Capital Territory) Stephen Kelly
- (Victoria (state)) Andrew Henderson
- (Victoria (state)) Jason Manos
- (Victoria (state)) Andrew Smith
- (Victoria (state)) Matthew Woolsey
- (Queensland) Lee Bodimeade (Barras)
- (Queensland) Simon Towns (Barras)
- (New South Wales) Ronald Charlton
- (New South Wales) Nathan Gilbert
- (New South Wales) Mark Harris
- (New South Wales) Aaron Oman
- (New South Wales) Kenneth Wark
- (Western Australia) Michael Boyce
- (Western Australia) Stuart Carruthers
- (Western Australia) Richard Gibson
- (Western Australia) Matthew Robbins
- (Queensland) Nathan Eglington (Blades)
- (Tasmania) Glen Lucas
- (Tasmania) Daniel Williams
- (Northern Territory) Jason Butcher
