= 2005 Men's Australian Hockey League =

Tournament details
- Host country: Australia
- Dates: 25 February – 3 April
- Teams: 8
- Venue(s): 9 (in 9 host cities)

Final positions
- Champions: (New South Wales) NSW Waratahs (3rd title)
- Runner-up: (Queensland) QLD Blades
- Third place: (Western Australia) WA Thundersticks

Tournament statistics
- Matches played: 52
- Goals scored: 293 (5.63 per match)
- Top scorer(s): (New South Wales) Taeke Taekema ( goals)
- Best player: (Queensland) Robert Hammond

The 2005 Men's Australian Hockey League was the 15th edition women's field hockey tournament. The tournament was held in various cities across Australia, and was contested from 25 February through to 3 April 2005.

The NSW Waratahs won the tournament for the third time after defeating the QLD Blades 4–3 in the final. WA Thundersticks finished in third place after defeating the Azuma Vikings 6–2 in the third and fourth place playoff.

== Participating teams ==
- (Australian Capital Territory) Canberra Lakers
- (New South Wales) NSW Waratahs
- (Northern Territory) Territory Stingers
- (Queensland) QLD Blades
- (South Australia) Adelaide Hotshots
- (Tasmania) Tassie Tigers
- (Victoria (state)) Azuma Vikings
- (Western Australia) WA Thundersticks

== Competition format ==
The 2005 Men's Australian Hockey League consisted of a single round robin format, followed by classification matches.

Teams from all 8 states and territories competed against one another throughout the pool stage. At the conclusion of the pool stage, the top four ranked teams progressed to the semi-finals, while the bottom four teams continued to the classification stage.

The first four rounds of the pool stage comprised two-legged fixtures between states. As a result, matches in rounds five to seven of the pool stage were worth double points, due to the single-leg format.

=== Point allocation ===
Points
W	WD	LD	L
3	2	1	0

Every match in the 2005 AHL needed an outright result. In the event of a draw, golden goal extra time was played out, and if the result was still a draw a penalty shoot-out was contested, with the winner receiving a bonus point.

== Results ==
=== Preliminary round ===
==== Standings ====
Pos	Team	Pld	W	WD	LD	L	GF	GA	GD	Pts	Qualification
1	(Queensland) QLD Blades	11	6	3	0	2	40	19	+21	32	Semi-finals
2	(New South Wales) NSW Waratahs	11	8	0	1	2	42	23	+19	29	Semi-finals
3	(Western Australia) WA Thundersticks	11	5	2	1	3	30	26	+4	28	Semi-finals
4	(Victoria (state)) Azuma Vikings	11	6	0	0	5	32	25	+7	24	Semi-finals
5	(Tasmania) Tassie Tigers	11	2	2	1	6	25	34	−9	18	
6	(South Australia) Adelaide Hotshots	11	4	1	1	5	35	37	−2	15	
7	(Australian Capital Territory) Canberra Lakers	11	3	0	3	5	24	40	−16	14	
8	(Northern Territory) Territory Stingers	11	2	0	1	8	13	37	−24	8	

Source: Clearing House
Rules for classification: 1) points; 2) goal difference; 3) matches won; 4) goals scored; 5) head-to-head result.

==== Fixtures ====
25 February 2005
20:00 (AEDT)

Tassie Tigers (Tasmania)	2–3	(Queensland) QLD Blades
Guest 12'; Tremayne 22'	Report	Butler 15', 61'; Clutton 39'

Stadium:
Tasmanian Hockey Centre, Hobart

25 February 2005
20:00 (AWST)

Perth Thundersticks (Western Australia)	0–1	(South Australia) Adelaide Hotshots
	Report	Wishart 44'

Stadium:
Perth Hockey Stadium, Perth

26 February 2005
19:00 (AEDT)

Azuma Vikings (Victoria (state))	2–3	(New South Wales) NSW Waratahs
Monte 9'; Hawes 25'	Report	Paterson 43'; Taekema 68'; Harris 70'

Stadium:
Victorian Hockey Centre, Melbourne

26 February 2005
19:00 (AEDT)

Tassie Tigers (Tasmania)	4–5 (a.e.t.)	(Queensland) QLD Blades
Ancher 12'; Deavin 24'; McAleese 54'; Wells 70'	Report	Brennan 13', 71'; Eglington 28'; Butler 32'; Hammond 42'

Stadium:
Tasmanian Hockey Centre, Hobart

26 February 2005
19:00 (AWST)

Perth Thundersticks (Western Australia)	3–3	(South Australia) Adelaide Hotshots
Trigwell 8'; McIntyre 29'; Bishop 48'	Report	Victory 23', 43'; Reece 28'
Penalties
	4–2

Stadium:
Perth Hockey Stadium, Perth

25 February 2005
20:00 (ACST)

Territory Stingers (Northern Territory)	1–2	(Australian Capital Territory) Canberra Lakers
Hewitt 2'	Report	P. MacKinnon 22'; D. Hotchkis 52'

Stadium:
Vodafone Hockey Centre, Darwin

27 February 2005
16:00 (AEDT)

Azuma Vikings (Victoria (state))	3–2	(New South Wales) NSW Waratahs
Geraghty 11', 19'; McLennan 41'	Report	Booth 16'; Mulcair 58'

Stadium:
Victorian Hockey Centre, Melbourne

27 February 2005
20:00 (ACST)

Territory Stingers (Northern Territory)	2–0	(Australian Capital Territory) Canberra Lakers
Hennessy 9', 61'	Report

Stadium:
Vodafone Hockey Centre, Darwin

5 March 2005
12:30 (ACDT)

Adelaide Hotshots (South Australia)	3–2	(Tasmania) Tassie Tigers
Kahlon 11'; Stephen 37'; Kelly 67'	Report	Richardson 48', 58'

Stadium:
Distinctive Homes Hockey Arena, Adelaide

5 March 2005
14:00 (AEDT)

NSW Waratahs (New South Wales)	7–4	(Western Australia) Perth Thundersticks
Harris 2', 7'; Naylor 4', 43'; Taekema 50', 53'; Matheson 64'	Report	Trigwell 23'; Bishop 25'; M. Boyce 64'; Galvin 70'

Stadium:
Illawarra Hockey Stadium, Wollongong

5 March 2005
14:00 (AEST)

QLD Blades (Queensland)	5–0	(Northern Territory) Territory Stingers
Brennan 2', 64'; B. Brown 18'; Hammond 38'; Barry 68'	Report

Stadium:
Queensland Hockey Centre, Brisbane

5 March 2005
18:00 (AEDT)

Canberra Lakers (Australian Capital Territory)	4–3	(Victoria (state)) Azuma Vikings
M. Hotchkis 27'; P. MacKinnon 29', 61'; Stebbings 32'	Report	Monte 5'; Geraghty 38', 68'

Stadium:
The Homes Centre, Canberra

6 March 2005
12:30 (ACDT)

Adelaide Hotshots (South Australia)	5–2	(Tasmania) Tassie Tigers
Victory 21', 54'; Stephen 56'; Crawford 59'; Kahlon 61'	Report	Cock 19'; Richardson 70'

Stadium:
Distinctive Homes Hockey Arena, Adelaide

6 March 2005
14:00 (AEDT)

NSW Waratahs (New South Wales)	3–1	(Western Australia) Perth Thundersticks
Taekema 20'; Matheson 43'; McCann 66'	Report	Trigwell 13'

Stadium:
Illawarra Hockey Stadium, Wollongong

6 March 2005
16:00 (AEDT)

Canberra Lakers (Australian Capital Territory)	2–5	(Victoria (state)) Azuma Vikings
Davidson 45'; Henwood 68'	Report	Monte 3'; Ford 18'; Mirecki 29'; J. Brooks 40'; Simpson 58'

Stadium:
The Hockey Centre, Canberra

6 March 2005
16:00 (AEST)

QLD Blades (Queensland)	2–0	(Northern Territory) Territory Stingers
Clutton 25'; B. Brown 66'	Report

Stadium:
Queensland Homes Centre, Brisbane

12 March 2005
18:00 (AEST)

Azuma Vikings (Victoria (state))	3–0	(Tasmania) Tassie Tigers
Ciriello 30'; Ford 48'; Geraghty 63'	Report

Stadium:
Victorian Hockey Centre, Melbourne

12 March 2005
18:00 (AEST)

Canberra Lakers (Australian Capital Territory)	0–3	(New South Wales) NSW Waratahs
	Report	Hogan 35'; B. Booth 39'; Taekema 42'

Stadium:
The Hockey Centre, Canberra

12 March 2005
19:00 (AWST)

Perth Thundersticks (Western Australia)	0–1 (a.e.t.)	(Queensland) QLD Blades
	Report	K. Brown 77'

Stadium:
Perth Hockey Stadium, Perth

12 March 2005
20:00 (ACST)

Territory Stingers (Northern Territory)	2–4	(South Australia) Adelaide Hotshots
McGregor 2'; A. Lockley 70'	Report	Kahlon 6', 14'; Stephen 12', 24'

Stadium:
Vodafone Hockey Centre, Darwin

13 March 2005
15:00 (AEST)

Azuma Vikings (Victoria (state))	1–3	(Tasmania) Tassie Tigers
T. Brooks 7'	Report	Ancher 4'; Guest 41'; Richardson 57'

Stadium:
Victorian Hockey Centre, Melbourne

13 March 2005
16:00 (AEST)

Canberra Lakers (Australian Capital Territory)	3–4	(New South Wales) NSW Waratahs
P. MacKinnon 9', 47'; Onitiri 23'	Report	Matheson 13', 17', 45'; Harris 32'

Stadium:
The Hockey Centre, Canberra

13 March 2005
18:00 (AWST)

Perth Thundersticks (Western Australia)	4–3	(Queensland) QLD Blades
Trigwell 12'; Bishop 28'; Bolton 33'; Gibson 52'	Report	Figura 21'; Eglington 30', 67'

Stadium:
Perth Hockey Stadium, Perth

13 March 2005
20:00 (ACST)

Territory Stingers (Northern Territory)	4–2	(South Australia) Adelaide Hotshots
Skippings 11'; Hewett 24'; McCormick 26'; T. Carroll 37'	Report	Victory 7', 51'

Stadium:
Vodafone Hockey Centre, Darwin

19 March 2005
13:00 (ACDT)

Adelaide Hotshots (South Australia)	6–5 (a.e.t.)	(Australian Capital Territory) Canberra Lakers
Victory 18', 41'; Boland 25', 52'; Kelly 55'; Dry 78'	Report	Stebbings 2'; Davidson 14', 70'; L. MacKinnon 28', 37'

Stadium:
Distinctive Homes Hockey Arena, Adelaide

19 March 2005
15:00 (AEDT)

NSW Waratahs (New South Wales)	5–0	(Northern Territory) Territory Stingers
Mulcair 1'; Taekema 18', 53', 54', 64'	Report

Stadium:
Sydney Olympic Park, Sydney

19 March 2005
16:00 (AEDT)

Tassie Tigers (Tasmania)	1–2	(Western Australia) WA Thundersticks
Ancher 6'	Report	Tobita 7'; M. Boyce 50'

Stadium:
Tasmanian Hockey Centre, Hobart

19 March 2005
16:00 (AEST)

QLD Blades (Queensland)	0–3	(Victoria (state)) Azuma Vikings
	Report	McLennan 17', 50'; Smyth 66'

Stadium:
Queensland Homes Centre, Brisbane

20 March 2005
12:00 (AEDT)

NSW Waratahs (New South Wales)	7–1	(Northern Territory) Territory Stingers
McCann 7', 58'; Hogan 19'; Taekema 28', 45'; Naylor 63', 68'	Report	Hennessy 38'

Stadium:
Sydney Olympic Park, Sydney

20 March 2005
13:00 (AEDT)

Tassie Tigers (Tasmania)	1–5	(Western Australia) WA Thundersticks
Wells 70'	Report	Trigwell 20', 22', 46'; Gibson 21'; McIntyre 56'

Stadium:
Tasmanian Hockey Centre, Hobart

20 March 2005
13:00 (AEST)

QLD Blades (Queensland)	3–0	(Victoria (state)) Azuma Vikings
Clutton 24', 29'; Eglington 47'	Report

Stadium:
Queensland Homes Centre, Brisbane

20 March 2005
13:00 (ACDT)

Adelaide Hotshots (South Australia)	2–3	(Australian Capital Territory) Canberra Lakers
Boland 36'; Crawford 43'	Report	P. MacKinnon 30'; Davidson 35', 50'

Stadium:
Distinctive Homes Hockey Arena, Adelaide

28 March 2005
13:00 (AEST)

QLD Blades (Queensland)	7–3	(South Australia) Adelaide Hotshots
Dwyer 10', 66'; Eglington 34'; Clutton 39'; B. Brown 46'; Elder 50'; Barry 68'	Report	Dry 26'; Kahlon 30'; Schubert 48'

Stadium:
Queensland Homes Centre, Brisbane

28 March 2005
15:00 (AEST)

Territory Stingers (Northern Territory)	0–3	(Victoria (state)) Azuma Vikings
	Report	Doerner 7', 22'; Simpson 60'

Stadium:
Queensland Homes Centre, Brisbane

28 March 2005
17:00 (AEST)

Canberra Lakers (Australian Capital Territory)	3–4 (a.e.t.)	(Western Australia) WA Thundersticks
D. Hotchkis 19', 53'; P. MacKinnon 49'	Report	Hopkins 14'; Tobita 57'; Bishop 70'; M. Boyce 71'

Stadium:
Queensland Homes Centre, Brisbane

28 March 2005
19:00 (AEST)

NSW Waratahs (New South Wales)	2–3	(Tasmania) Tassie Tigers
B. Booth 42'; McCann 44'	Report	Wells 5'; McAleese 62'; Richardson 63'

Stadium:
Queensland Homes Centre, Brisbane

29 March 2005
13:00 (AEST)

Azuma Vikings (Victoria (state))	6–4	(South Australia) Adelaide Hotshots
Ford 9'; Doerner 26', 29', 40'; Mirecki 41'; J. Brooks 42'	Report	Pannell 8', 11'; Schubert 28', 56'

Stadium:
Queensland Homes Centre, Brisbane

29 March 2005
15:00 (AEST)

WA Thundersticks (Western Australia)	3–0	(Northern Territory) Territory Stingers
Tobita 28'; M. Boyce 45'; Gibson 56'	Report

Stadium:
Queensland Homes Centre, Brisbane

29 March 2005
17:00 (AEST)

Tassie Tigers (Tasmania)	3–2 (a.e.t.)	(Australian Capital Territory) Canberra Lakers
Guest 32', 79'; Richardson 66'	Report	Hawes 41'; Davidson 43'

Stadium:
Queensland Homes Centre, Brisbane

29 March 2005
19:00 (AEST)

NSW Waratahs (New South Wales)	3–4 (a.e.t.)	(Queensland) QLD Blades
Naylor 2'; McCann 44', 68'	Report	Eglington 7', 75'; Clutton 18'; Dwyer 51'

Stadium:
Queensland Homes Centre, Brisbane

31 March 2005
13:00 (AEST)

Territory Stingers (Northern Territory)	3–4 (a.e.t.)	(Tasmania) Tassie Tigers
Hennessy 31', 58'; A. Lockley 33'	Report	Richardson 30', 40', 75'; Tremayne 67'

Stadium:
Queensland Homes Centre, Brisbane

31 March 2005
15:00 (AEST)

Adelaide Hotshots (South Australia)	2–3	(New South Wales) NSW Waratahs
Crawford 18'; Telfer 70'	Report	Harris 20'; Naylor 34'; Taekema 67'

Stadium:
Queensland Homes Centre, Brisbane

31 March 2005
17:00 (AEST)

QLD Blades (Queensland)	7–0	(Australian Capital Territory) Canberra Lakers
Dwyer 5'; B. Brown 23', 30', 64', 70'; Barry 25'; Butler 27'	Report

Stadium:
Queensland Homes Centre, Brisbane

31 March 2005
19:00 (AEST)

Azuma Vikings (Victoria (state))	3–4	(Western Australia) WA Thundersticks
Mirecki 23'; Doerner 33', 41'	Report	McIntyre 24'; Galvin 34'; Gibson 46'; Bishop 51'

Stadium:
Queensland Homes Centre, Brisbane

=== Classification round ===
==== Fifth to eighth place classification ====
Crossover
2 April 2005
(Tasmania) Tassie Tigers	4
(Northern Territory) Territory Stingers	3
2 April 2005
(South Australia) Adelaide Hotshots	4
(Australian Capital Territory) Canberra Lakers	1

Fifth Place
3 April 2005
(Tasmania) Tassie Tigers	1
(South Australia) Adelaide Hotshots	4
Seventh Place
3 April 2005
(Northern Territory) Territory Stingers	1
(Australian Capital Territory) Canberra Lakers	5

===== Crossover =====
2 April 2005
08:30 (AEST)

Tassie Tigers (Tasmania)	4–3	(Northern Territory) Territory Stingers
Richardson 28'; Marshall 37'; Wells 61'; Close 63'	Report	Hennessy 30', 69'; McGregor 66'

Stadium:
State Hockey Centre, Brisbane

2 April 2005
10:30 (AEST)

Adelaide Hotshots (South Australia)	4–1	(Australian Capital Territory) Canberra Lakers
Stephen 40'; Victory 43', 54'; Schubert 51'	Report	Taylor 49'

Stadium:
State Hockey Centre, Brisbane

===== Seventh and eighth place =====
3 April 2005
08:30 (AEST)

Territory Stingers (Northern Territory)	1–5	(Australian Capital Territory) Canberra Lakers
Hennessy 64'	Report	Davidson 28'; Hawes 33'; Taylor 62'; Cummins 62'; L. MacKinnon 69'

Stadium:
State Hockey Centre, Brisbane

===== Fifth and sixth place =====
3 April 2005
10:30 (AEST)

Tassie Tigers (Tasmania)	1–4	(South Australia) Adelaide Hotshots
Clifford 3'	Report	Boland 9'; Schubert 9', 21'; Dry 24'

Stadium:
State Hockey Centre, Brisbane

==== First to fourth place classification ====
Semi-finals
2 April 2005
(Queensland) QLD Blades	4
(Victoria (state)) Azuma Vikings	3
2 April 2005
(New South Wales) NSW Waratahs	4
(Western Australia) WA Thundersticks	3

Final
3 April 2005
(Queensland) QLD Blades	3
(New South Wales) NSW Waratahs	4
Third Place
3 April 2005
(Victoria (state)) Azuma Vikings	2
(Western Australia) WA Thundersticks	6

===== Semi-finals =====
2 April 2005
12:30 (AEST)

QLD Blades (Queensland)	4–3	(Victoria (state)) Azuma Vikings
Dwyer 3'; Butler 17'; Eglington 49'; Elder 70'	Report	Doerner 5', 58'; Simpson 64'

Stadium:
State Hockey Centre, Brisbane

2 April 2005
14:30 (AEST)

NSW Waratahs (New South Wales)	4–3	(Western Australia) WA Thundersticks
Mulcair 5'; Taekema 8', 12'; Matheson 46'	Report	McIntyre 4'; Tobita 35'; Bolton 62'

Stadium:
State Hockey Centre, Brisbane

===== Third and fourth place =====
3 April 2005
12:30 (AEST)

Azuma Vikings (Victoria (state))	2–6	(Western Australia) WA Thundersticks
Ford 6'; McLennan 27'	Report	Hopkins 15'; Tobita 21'; M. Boyce 33', 54'; Galvin 40'; McIntyre 48'

Stadium:
State Hockey Centre, Brisbane

===== Final =====
3 April 2005
14:30 (AEST)

QLD Blades (Queensland)	3–4	(New South Wales) NSW Waratahs
Eglington 20'; B. Brown 21'; Dwyer 34'	Report	McCann 6', 48'; Matheson 7'; Harris 69'

Stadium:
State Hockey Centre, Brisbane

== Statistics ==
=== Final standings ===
Pos	Team	Pld	W	WD	LD	L	GF	GA	GD	Pts	Qualification
1st place, gold medalist(s)	(New South Wales) NSW Waratahs	13	10	0	1	2	50	29	+21	35	Gold Medal
2nd place, silver medalist(s)	(Queensland) QLD Blades	13	7	3	0	3	47	26	+21	35	Silver Medal
3rd place, bronze medalist(s)	(Western Australia) WA Thundersticks	13	6	2	1	4	39	32	+7	31	Bronze Medal
4	(Victoria (state)) Azuma Vikings	13	6	0	0	7	37	35	+2	24	
5	(South Australia) Adelaide Hotshots	13	6	1	1	5	43	39	+4	21	
6	(Tasmania) Tassie Tigers	13	3	2	1	7	30	41	−11	21	
7	(Australian Capital Territory) Canberra Lakers	13	4	0	3	6	30	45	−15	17	
8	(Northern Territory) Territory Stingers	13	2	0	1	10	17	46	−29	8	

Source: Clearing House

=== Goalscorers ===
There were 293 goals scored in 52 matches, for an average of 5.63 goals per match.

14 goals

- (New South Wales) Taeke Taekema

10 goals

- (South Australia) Craig Victory
- (Tasmania) Marcus Richardson

9 goals

- (Queensland) Nathan Eglington
- (Victoria (state)) Luke Doerner

8 goals

- (New South Wales) Michael McCann
- (Northern Territory) Colin Hennessy
- (Queensland) Blair Brown

7 goals

- (Australian Capital Territory) Iain Davidson
- (Australian Capital Territory) Paul MacKinnon
- (New South Wales) Eli Matheson

6 goals

- (New South Wales) Mark Harris
- (New South Wales) Matthew Naylor
- (Queensland) George Clutton
- (Queensland) Jamie Dwyer
- (South Australia) Grant Schubert

5 goals

- (Queensland) Dean Butler
- (South Australia) Ravi Kahlon
- (South Australia) Dale Stephen
- (Victoria (state)) Declan Geraghty

4 goals

- (Queensland) Scott Brennan
- (South Australia) Evan Boland
- (Tasmania) David Guest
- (Tasmania) Matthew Wells
- (Victoria (state)) Russell Ford
- (Victoria (state)) Alistair McLennan

3 goals

- (Australian Capital Territory) Daniel Hotchkis
- (Australian Capital Territory) Luke MacKinnon
- (New South Wales) Brendan Booth
- (New South Wales) James Mulcair
- (Queensland) Wayne Barry
- (South Australia) Damon Crawford
- (South Australia) Joel Dry
- (Tasmania) Paul Ancher
- (Victoria (state)) Jason Brooks
- (Victoria (state)) Andrew Monte
- (Victoria (state)) Glenn Simpson

2 goals

- (Australian Capital Territory) Joshua Hawes
- (Australian Capital Territory) Jonathon Stebbings
- (Australian Capital Territory) Benjamin Taylor
- (New South Wales) Michael Hogan
- (Northern Territory) Dash Hewett
- (Northern Territory) Adrian Lockley
- (Northern Territory) Ian McGregor
- (Queensland) Troy Elder
- (Queensland) Robert Hammond
- (South Australia) Daniel Kelly
- (South Australia) Nicholas Pannell
- (Tasmania) Shea McAleese
- (Tasmania) Nicholas Tremayne
- (Victoria (state)) Daniel Mirecki

1 goal

- (Australian Capital Territory) Jamie Cummins
- (Australian Capital Territory) Casey Henwood
- (Australian Capital Territory) Matthew Hotchkis
- (Australian Capital Territory) Seyi Onitiri
- (New South Wales) Mark Paterson
- (Northern Territory) Travis Carroll
- (Northern Territory) Darryl McCormick
- (Northern Territory) David Skippings
- (Queensland) Kiel Brown
- (Queensland) Tobias Figura
- (South Australia) Gregory Reece
- (South Australia) William Telfer
- (South Australia) Ian Wishart
- (Tasmania) Adam Clifford
- (Tasmania) Oliver Close
- (Tasmania) Geoffrey Cock
- (Tasmania) Timothy Deavin
- (Tasmania) Phillip Marshall
- (Victoria (state)) Travis Brooks
- (Victoria (state)) Christopher Ciriello
- (Victoria (state)) Zak Hawes
- (Victoria (state)) Ian Smyth
