= 2004 Men's Australian Hockey League =

Tournament details
- Host country: Australia
- City: Melbourne
- Dates: 17–29 February
- Teams: 8
- Venue(s): State Netball Hockey Centre

Final positions
- Champions: (Queensland) QLD Blades (3rd title)
- Runner-up: (Western Australia) WA Thundersticks
- Third place: (Victoria (state)) VIC Vikings

Tournament statistics
- Matches played: 36
- Goals scored: 205 (5.69 per match)
- Top scorer(s): (Queensland) Troy Elder (11 goals)
- Best player: (Victoria (state)) Stephen Mowlam

The 2004 Men's Australian Hockey League was the 14th edition of the men's field hockey tournament. The tournament was held at the State Netball Hockey Centre in Melbourne, from 17 to 29 February 2004.

QLD Blades won the tournament for the third time after defeating the WA Thundersticks 4–1 in the final. VIC Vikings finished in third place after defeating NSW Panthers 4–1 in the third and fourth place playoff.

== Participating teams ==
- (Australian Capital Territory) Canberra Lakers
- (New South Wales) NSW Panthers
- (Northern Territory) Territory Stingers
- (Queensland) QLD Blades
- (South Australia) Adelaide Hotshots
- (Tasmania) Tassie Tigers
- (Victoria (state)) VIC Vikings
- (Western Australia) WA Thundersticks

== Competition format ==
The 2004 Men's Australian Hockey League consisted of a single round robin format, followed by classification matches.

Teams from all 8 states and territories competed against one another throughout the pool stage. At the conclusion of the pool stage, the top four ranked teams progressed to the semi-finals, while the bottom four teams continued to the classification stage.

=== Point allocation ===
All matches had an outright result, meaning drawn matches were decided in either golden goal extra time, or a penalty shoot-out. Match points were as follows:

· 3 points for a win
· 1 points to each team in the event of a draw
· 1 point will be awarded to the winner of the shoot-out
· 0 points to the loser of the match

== Results ==
All times are local (AEDT).

=== Preliminary round ===
==== Standings ====
| Pos | Team | Pld | W | WD | LD | L | GF | GA | GD | Pts | Qualification |
|---|---|---|---|---|---|---|---|---|---|---|---|
| 1 | (Queensland) QLD Blades | 7 | 6 | 0 | 1 | 0 | 32 | 16 | +16 | 19 | Advanced to Semi-finals |
| 2 | (Western Australia) WA Thundersticks | 7 | 5 | 0 | 1 | 1 | 23 | 15 | +8 | 16 | Advanced to Semi-finals |
| 3 | (New South Wales) NSW Panthers | 7 | 4 | 1 | 1 | 1 | 29 | 19 | +10 | 15 | Advanced to Semi-finals |
| 4 | (Victoria (state)) VIC Vikings (H) | 7 | 4 | 1 | 0 | 2 | 23 | 12 | +11 | 14 | Advanced to Semi-finals |
| 5 | (South Australia) Adelaide Hotshots | 7 | 3 | 1 | 0 | 3 | 21 | 20 | +1 | 11 | |
| 6 | (Tasmania) Tassie Tigers | 7 | 2 | 0 | 0 | 5 | 11 | 25 | −14 | 6 | |
| 7 | (Northern Territory) Territory Stingers | 7 | 0 | 1 | 0 | 6 | 9 | 21 | −12 | 2 | |
| 8 | (Australian Capital Territory) Canberra Lakers | 7 | 0 | 0 | 1 | 6 | 14 | 34 | −20 | 1 | |

Source: Hockey Australia
Rules for classification: 1) points; 2) goal difference; 3) matches won; 4) goals scored; 5) head-to-head result.
(H) Host

==== Fixtures ====
17 February 2004
10:00

| Tassie Tigers (Tasmania) | 1–6 | (Queensland) QLD Blades |
|---|---|---|
| Wright 67' | Report | Elder 12'; Clutton 14', 43'; M. Brennan 29'; De Young 60'; Butler 64' |

Umpires:
Kieran Deland (AUS)
Murray Grime (AUS)

17 February 2004
12:00

| Canberra Lakers (Australian Capital Territory) | 3–6 | (Western Australia) WA Thundersticks |
|---|---|---|
| Dawson 28'; Z. Hawes 39'; M. Hotchkis 55' | Report | Webster 10', 44'; Gibson 29', 54'; M. Boyce 48'; Woodhouse 67' |

Umpires:
Benjamin de Young (AUS)
Adam Kearns (AUS)

17 February 2004
14:00

| VIC Vikings (Victoria (state)) | 2–0 | (Northern Territory) Territory Stingers |
|---|---|---|
| Ford 26'; Geraghty 39' | Report |

Umpires:
Patrick McCann (AUS)
Paul Ludwig (AUS)

17 February 2004
16:00

| NSW Panthers (New South Wales) | 6–2 | (South Australia) Adelaide Hotshots |
|---|---|---|
| Hogan 4', 10', 24'; McCann 13'; Harris 18'; Beaton 63' | Report | Fitzgerald 20'; Wishart 49' |

Umpires:
Stephen Rogers (AUS)
Ian Lockley (AUS)

18 February 2004
14:00

| Territory Stingers (Northern Territory) | 2–5 | (New South Wales) NSW Panthers |
|---|---|---|
| C. Hennessy 27'; Hewett 65' | Report | Livermore 33'; Paterson 35'; Fibbins 46'; Commens 49'; Matheson 55' |

Umpires:
Alistair Grieve (AUS)
Murray Grime (AUS)

18 February 2004
16:00

| Tassie Tigers (Tasmania) | 2–0 | (Australian Capital Territory) Canberra Lakers |
|---|---|---|
| Curry 7'; Guest 25' | Report |

Umpires:
Paul Ludwig (AUS)
Stephen Rogers (AUS)

18 February 2004
18:00

| Adelaide Hotshots (South Australia) | 1–3 | (Victoria (state)) VIC Vikings |
|---|---|---|
| Bircher 49' | Report | McLennan 11'; Smith 16'; Geraghty 55' |

Umpires:
Adam Kearns (AUS)
Benjamin de Young (AUS)

18 February 2004
20:00

| QLD Blades (Queensland) | 5–4 | (Western Australia) WA Thundersticks |
|---|---|---|
| M. Brennan 6', 24'; Elder 57', 61'; Butler 68' | Report | S. Boyce 2', 35'; M. Boyce 52'; Webster 66' |

Umpires:
Ian Lockley (AUS)
Patrick McCann (AUS)

20 February 2004
14:00

| WA Thundersticks (Western Australia) | 5–1 | (Tasmania) Tassie Tigers |
|---|---|---|
| Gibson 4'; Galvin 23'; M. Boyce 42'; Webster 47'; Trigwell 62' | Report | Curry 17' |

Umpires:
Kieran Deland (AUS)
Stephen Rogers (AUS)

20 February 2004
16:00

| Territory Stingers (Northern Territory) | 1–3 | (South Australia) Adelaide Hotshots |
|---|---|---|
| Abbott 38' | Report | Victory 5', 68'; Johnson 60' |

Umpires:
Patrick McCann (AUS)
Benjamin de Young (AUS)

20 February 2004
18:00

| QLD Blades (Queensland) | 6–0 | (Australian Capital Territory) Canberra Lakers |
|---|---|---|
| Elder 6', 56'; Eglington 8'; Butler 23'; M. Brennan 49'; B. Brown 63' | Report |

Umpires:
David Gentles (AUS)
Alistair Grieve (AUS)

20 February 2004
20:00

| VIC Vikings (Victoria (state)) | 3–3 (a.e.t.) | (New South Wales) NSW Panthers |
|---|---|---|
| Doerner 19', 35'; Smith 68' | Report | Fibbins 6'; Commens 45'; McCann 50' |
Penalties
| Ford (penalty shoot-out scored); Doerner (penalty shoot-out scored); Smith (penalty shoot-out scored); T. Brooks (penalty shoot-out scored) | 4–2 | (penalty shoot-out missed) McCann; (penalty shoot-out scored) Paterson; (penalty shoot-out scored) Commens; (penalty shoot-out missed) Livermore |

Umpires:
Murray Grime (AUS)
Paul Ludwig (AUS)

22 February 2004
10:00

| Adelaide Hotshots (South Australia) | 2–1 | (Tasmania) Tassie Tigers |
|---|---|---|
| Schubert 50'; Victory 69' | Report | Close 5' |

Umpires:
David Gentles (AUS)
Adam Kearns (AUS)

22 February 2004
12:00

| Canberra Lakers (Australian Capital Territory) | 1–5 | (Victoria (state)) VIC Vikings |
|---|---|---|
| Cummins 52' | Report | Smith 27', 47'; Priddle 29'; Doerner 32', 54' |

Umpires:
Kieran Deland (AUS)
Benjamin de Young (AUS)

22 February 2004
14:00

| NSW Panthers (New South Wales) | 2–3 | (Queensland) QLD Blades |
|---|---|---|
| Fibbins 36'; Livermore 66' | Report | Elder 14'; Eglington 55', 64' |

Umpires:
Ian Lockley (AUS)
Murray Grime (AUS)

22 February 2004
16:00

| WA Thundersticks (Western Australia) | 2–1 | (Northern Territory) Territory Stingers |
|---|---|---|
| Hopkins 3'; Gibson 31' | Report | Clancy 38' |

Umpires:
Alistair Grieve (AUS)
Paul Ludwig (AUS)

23 February 2004
10:00

| NSW Panthers (New South Wales) | 4–3 | (Australian Capital Territory) Canberra Lakers |
|---|---|---|
| Naylor 31'; Hogan 37'; McCann 46'; Green 55' | Report | Bishop 2'; M. Hotchkis 14'; Judge 23' |

Umpires:
Adam Kearns (AUS)
Alistair Grieve (AUS)

23 February 2004
12:00

| VIC Vikings (Victoria (state)) | 3–4 | (Queensland) QLD Blades |
|---|---|---|
| Doerner 23'; T. Brooks 59'; Smith 62' | Report | Elder 36', 64'; Morris 53'; S. Brennan 56' |

Umpires:
David Gentles (AUS)
Kieran Deland (AUS)

23 February 2004
14:00

| WA Thundersticks (Western Australia) | 2–1 | (South Australia) Adelaide Hotshots |
|---|---|---|
| S. Boyce 13', 20' | Report | Victory 42' |

Umpires:
Patrick McCann (AUS)
Ian Lockley (AUS)

23 February 2004
16:00

| Territory Stingers (Northern Territory) | 0–1 | (Tasmania) Tassie Tigers |
|---|---|---|
| | Report | Guest 54' |

Umpires:
Stephen Rogers (AUS)
Murray Grime (AUS)

25 February 2004
10:00

| QLD Blades (Queensland) | 3–4 (a.e.t.) | (South Australia) Adelaide Hotshots |
|---|---|---|
| Barry 5', 55'; Butler 68' | Report | Victory 44', 61'; Bircher 48'; Schubert 74' |

Umpires:
Ian Lockley (AUS)
Patrick McCann (AUS)

25 February 2004
12:00

| Canberra Lakers (Australian Capital Territory) | 3–3 (a.e.t.) | (Northern Territory) Territory Stingers |
|---|---|---|
| P. MacKinnon 10'; Bishop 47'; Dawson 70+' | Report | McGregor 44', 46'; Carroll 56' |
Penalties
| J. Hawes (penalty shoot-out scored); Tomadini (penalty shoot-out missed); Stebbings (penalty shoot-out missed); Dawson (penalty shoot-out missed) | 1–3 | (penalty shoot-out scored) O'Brien; (penalty shoot-out scored) C. Hennessy; (penalty shoot-out scored) D. Hennessy |

Umpires:
David Gentles (AUS)
Benjamin de Young (AUS)

25 February 2004
14:00

| Tassie Tigers (Tasmania) | 3–5 | (New South Wales) NSW Panthers |
|---|---|---|
| Guest 30', 59'; Clifford 67' | Report | Fibbins 7'; McCann 10', 23', 53'; Naylor 53' |

Umpires:
Alistair Grieve (AUS)
Stephen Rogers (AUS)

25 February 2004
16:00

| WA Thundersticks (Western Australia) | 1–0 | (Victoria (state)) VIC Vikings |
|---|---|---|
| McIntyre 2' | Report |

Umpires:
Kieran Deland (AUS)
Paul Ludwig (AUS)

26 February 2004
14:00

| QLD Blades (Queensland) | 5–2 | (Northern Territory) Territory Stingers |
|---|---|---|
| Clutton 22'; Elder 50'; Barry 51'; M. Brennan 52'; Eglington 66' | Report | Hewett 4'; D. Hennessy 65' |

Umpires:
Patrick McCann (AUS)
Alistair Grieve (AUS)

26 February 2004
16:00

| NSW Panthers (New South Wales) | 4–3 (a.e.t.) | (Western Australia) WA Thundersticks |
|---|---|---|
| McCann 26'; Livermore 39'; Hogan 66', 73' | Report | S. Boyce 17'; McIntyre 37', 41' |

Umpires:
Adam Kearns (AUS)
Paul Ludwig (AUS)

26 February 2004
18:00

| Adelaide Hotshots (South Australia) | 8–4 | (Australian Capital Territory) Canberra Lakers |
|---|---|---|
| Cleghorn 18'; Schubert 30', 50', 51', 55'; Wishart 43'; Lee 48'; Reece 49' | Report | Taylor 5', 59'; M. Hotchkis 8'; Judge 67' |

Umpires:
Stephen Rogers (AUS)
Kieran Deland (AUS)

26 February 2004
20:00

| VIC Vikings (Victoria (state)) | 7–2 | (Tasmania) Tassie Tigers |
|---|---|---|
| Smyth 16'; Smith 39'; Doerner 44'; McLennan 52'; Mirecki 58'; Monte 60'; Davis 66' | Report | Guest 21', 68' |

Umpires:
Benjamin de Young (AUS)
Murray Grime (AUS)

=== Classification round ===
Crossover
28 February 2004
(South Australia) Adelaide Hotshots (a.e.t) | 4
(Australian Capital Territory) Canberra Lakers | 3
28 February 2004
(Tasmania) Tassie Tigers | 2
(Northern Territory) Territory Stingers | 3

Fifth Place
29 February 2004
(South Australia) Adelaide Hotshots | 5
(Northern Territory) Territory Stingers | 4
Seventh Place
29 February 2004
(Australian Capital Territory) Canberra Lakers | 5
(Tasmania) Tassie Tigers | 0

==== Crossover ====
28 February 2004
08:30

| Adelaide Hotshots (South Australia) | 4–3 (a.e.t.) | (Australian Capital Territory) Canberra Lakers |
|---|---|---|
| Victory 16'; Schubert 39'; Johnson 64'; Reece 74' | Report | Judge 25'; M. Hotchkis 30'; Stebbings 59' |

Umpires:
Benjamin de Young (AUS)
Ian Lockley (AUS)

28 February 2004
10:30

| Tassie Tigers (Tasmania) | 2–3 | (Northern Territory) Territory Stingers |
|---|---|---|
| Wright 18'; Lucas 20' | Report | C. Hennessy 3'; J. Anstess 43', 65' |

Umpires:
Patrick McCann (AUS)
Stephen Rogers (AUS)

==== Seventh and eighth place ====
29 February 2004
08:30

| Canberra Lakers (Australian Capital Territory) | 5–0 | (Tasmania) Tassie Tigers |
|---|---|---|
| Stebbings 10'; Bishop 28'; P. MacKinnon 30', 59'; M. Hotchkis 44' | Report |

Umpires:
Alistair Grieve (AUS)
Kieran Deland (AUS)

==== Fifth and sixth place ====
29 February 2004
10:30

| Adelaide Hotshots (South Australia) | 5–4 | (Northern Territory) Territory Stingers |
|---|---|---|
| Victory 8', 51'; Schubert 37', 42'; Holt 40' | Report | C. Hennessy 47', 56', 60'; D. Hennessy 59' |

Umpires:
Adam Kearns (AUS)
Patrick McCann (AUS)

=== Medal round ===
Semi-finals
28 February 2004
(Queensland) QLD Blades | 2
(Victoria (state)) VIC Vikings | 0
28 February 2004
(Western Australia) WA Thundersticks (a.e.t) | 3
(New South Wales) NSW Panthers | 2

Gold Medal Match
29 February 2004
(Queensland) QLD Blades | 4
(Western Australia) WA Thundersticks | 1
Bronze Medal Match
29 February 2004
(Victoria (state)) VIC Vikings | 4
(New South Wales) NSW Panthers | 1

==== Semi-finals ====
28 February 2004
12:30

| QLD Blades (Queensland) | 2–0 | (Victoria (state)) VIC Vikings |
|---|---|---|
| Eglington 36', 61' | Report |

Umpires:
Murray Grime (AUS)
Kieran Deland (AUS)

28 February 2004
14:30

| WA Thundersticks (Western Australia) | 3–2 (a.e.t.) | (New South Wales) NSW Panthers |
|---|---|---|
| Bolton 15'; S. Boyce 41'; M. Boyce 74' | Report | Naylor 10'; McCann 64' |

Umpires:
Paul Ludwig (AUS)
Adam Kearns (AUS)

==== Bronze medal match ====
29 February 2004
12:30

| VIC Vikings (Victoria (state)) | 4–1 | (New South Wales) NSW Panthers |
|---|---|---|
| J. Brooks 23'; Ford 33'; Priddle 50'; Doerner 60' | Report | Beaton 5' |

Umpires:
Ian Lockley (AUS)
Stephen Rogers (AUS)

==== Gold medal match ====
29 February 2004
14:30

| QLD Blades (Queensland) | 4–1 | (Western Australia) WA Thundersticks |
|---|---|---|
| Elder 20', 53'; Butler 33'; Eglington 58' | Report | S. Boyce 28' |

Umpires:
Paul Ludwig (AUS)
Murray Grime (AUS)

== Final standings ==
| Pos | Team | Pld | W | WD | LD | L | GF | GA | GD | Pts | Qualification |
|---|---|---|---|---|---|---|---|---|---|---|---|
| 1st place, gold medalist(s) | (Queensland) QLD Blades | 9 | 8 | 0 | 1 | 0 | 38 | 17 | +21 | 25 | Gold Medal |
| 2nd place, silver medalist(s) | (Western Australia) WA Thundersticks | 9 | 5 | 1 | 1 | 2 | 27 | 21 | +6 | 18 | Silver Medal |
| 3rd place, bronze medalist(s) | (Victoria (state)) VIC Vikings (H) | 9 | 5 | 1 | 0 | 3 | 27 | 15 | +12 | 17 | Bronze Medal |
| 4 | (New South Wales) NSW Panthers | 9 | 4 | 1 | 2 | 2 | 32 | 26 | +6 | 16 | |
| 5 | (South Australia) Adelaide Hotshots | 9 | 4 | 2 | 0 | 3 | 30 | 27 | +3 | 16 | |
| 6 | (Northern Territory) Territory Stingers | 9 | 1 | 1 | 0 | 7 | 16 | 28 | −12 | 5 | |
| 7 | (Australian Capital Territory) Canberra Lakers | 9 | 1 | 0 | 2 | 6 | 22 | 38 | −16 | 5 | |
| 8 | (Tasmania) Tassie Tigers | 9 | 2 | 0 | 0 | 7 | 13 | 33 | −20 | 6 | |

Source: Hockey Australia
(H) Host
