= 2008 Men's Australian Hockey League =

Tournament details
- Host country: Australia
- City: Canberra
- Teams: 8
- Venue(s): National Hockey Centre

Final positions
- Champions: (Western Australia) WA Thundersticks (7th title)
- Runner-up: (Queensland) QLD Blades
- Third place: (Victoria (state)) VIC Vikings

Tournament statistics
- Matches played: 36
- Goals scored: 178 (4.94 per match)
- Top scorer(s): (Victoria (state)) Luke Doerner (9 goals)
- Best player: (Western Australia) Bevan George

The 2008 Men's Australian Hockey League was the 18th edition of the men's field hockey tournament. The tournament was held in Australia's capital city, Canberra.

The WA Thundersticks won the gold medal for the seventh time by defeating the QLD Blades 4–2 in the final.

== Competition format ==
The tournament comprised a single round-robin format in the preliminary round. At the conclusion of the preliminary round, teams ranked first to fourth progressed to the medal round, while teams ranked fifth to eighth progressed to the classification round.

== Teams ==
- (Australian Capital Territory) Canberra Lakers
- (South Australia) Southern Hotshots
- (New South Wales) NSW Waratahs
- (Tasmania) Tassie Tigers
- (Northern Territory) NT Stingers
- (Victoria (state)) VIC Vikings
- (Queensland) QLD Blades
- (Western Australia) WA Thundersticks

== Results ==
=== Preliminary round ===
Pos	Team	Pld	W	WD	LD	L	GF	GA	GD	Pts	Qualification
1	(Queensland) QLD Blades	7	6	0	0	1	28	14	+14	18	Semi-finals
2	(Victoria (state)) VIC Vikings	7	5	1	0	1	22	8	+14	17	Semi-finals
3	(Western Australia) WA Thundersticks	7	4	0	1	2	17	8	+9	13	Semi-finals
4	(Tasmania) Tassie Tigers	7	4	0	0	3	19	18	+1	12	Semi-finals
5	(South Australia) Southern Hotshots	7	4	0	0	3	17	20	−3	12	
6	(Australian Capital Territory) Canberra Lakers	7	3	0	0	4	17	18	−1	9	
7	(New South Wales) NSW Waratahs	7	1	0	0	6	13	17	−4	3	
8	(Northern Territory) NT Stingers	7	0	0	0	7	5	35	−30	0	

Source: Clearing House
Rules for classification: 1) points; 2) goal difference; 3) goals scored; 4) head-to-head result.

==== Fixtures ====
25 February 2008
11:00

VIC Vikings (Victoria (state))	6–0	(Northern Territory) NT Stingers
Doerner 6', 19'; T. Brooks 29', 52'; J. Brooks 59'; McLennan 64'	Report

Stadium:
National Hockey Centre, Canberra

25 February 2008
13:00

QLD Blades (Queensland)	2–1	(South Australia) Southern Hotshots
Elder 28'; Dwyer 30'	Report	Schubert 54'

Stadium:
National Hockey Centre, Canberra

25 February 2008
15:00

WA Thundersticks (Western Australia)	5–0	(New South Wales) NSW Waratahs
Hopkins 4'; Smith 30'; Kavanagh 44'; Dancer 67'; Blakeney 69'	Report

Stadium:
National Hockey Centre, Canberra

25 February 2008
17:00

Canberra Lakers (Australian Capital Territory)	0–2	(Tasmania) Tassie Tigers
	Report	Cock 27'; Guest 61'

Stadium:
National Hockey Centre, Canberra

26 February 2008
11:00

NSW Waratahs (New South Wales)	2–3	(Queensland) QLD Blades
Livermore 29'; Sutherland 32'	Report	Dwyer 45'; De Young 61'; Elder 66'

Stadium:
National Hockey Centre, Canberra

26 February 2008
13:00

Tassie Tigers (Tasmania)	2–5	(Victoria (state)) VIC Vikings
Ancher 24', 41'	Report	Doerner 21', 22'; McLennan 25'; Mirecki 37'; Kleinschmidt 68'

Stadium:
National Hockey Centre, Canberra

26 February 2008
15:00

Southern Hotshots (South Australia)	3–6	(Australian Capital Territory) Canberra Lakers
Cleghorn 13'; Reece 31'; Porter 63'	Report	Onitiri 2'; Davidson 12'; Turner 34', 39', 41'; D. Hotchkis 43'

Stadium:
National Hockey Centre, Canberra

26 February 2008
17:00

NT Stingers (Northern Territory)	0–3	(Western Australia) WA Thundersticks
	Report	Smith 11'; Kavanagh 14'; Blakeney 27'

Stadium:
National Hockey Centre, Canberra

28 February 2008
11:00

Southern Hotshots (South Australia)	3–2	(Western Australia) WA Thundersticks
Dry 37'; Reece 70'; Cleghorn 81'	Report	Kavanagh 35'; Brown 55'

Stadium:
National Hockey Centre, Canberra

28 February 2008
13:00

NSW Waratahs (New South Wales)	0–1	(Tasmania) Tassie Tigers
	Report	Richardson 49'

Stadium:
National Hockey Centre, Canberra

28 February 2008
15:00

QLD Blades (Queensland)	8–0	(Northern Territory) NT Stingers
Eglington 3'; Dwyer 4'; Burns 30'; Elder 37', 53'; Butler 37'; M. Bates 63', 68'	Report

Stadium:
National Hockey Centre, Canberra

28 February 2008
17:00

Canberra Lakers (Australian Capital Territory)	1–4	(Victoria (state)) VIC Vikings
Bishop 4'	Report	Geraghty 8'; T. Brooks 33'; Doerner 44', 47'

Stadium:
National Hockey Centre, Canberra

1 March 2008
11:00

QLD Blades (Queensland)	3–2	(Australian Capital Territory) Canberra Lakers
Elder 18', 60'; Burns 45'	Report	Davidson 38'; Jorgensen 49'

Stadium:
National Hockey Centre, Canberra

1 March 2008
13:00

VIC Vikings (Victoria (state))	0–0	(Western Australia) WA Thundersticks
	Report
Penalties
	5–4

Stadium:
National Hockey Centre, Canberra

1 March 2008
15:00

Tassie Tigers (Tasmania)	4–1	(Northern Territory) NT Stingers
Ockenden 1', 46'; Guest 23', 26'	Report	Robertson 16'

Stadium:
National Hockey Centre, Canberra

1 March 2008
17:00

NSW Waratahs (New South Wales)	1–3	(South Australia) Southern Hotshots
Sutherland 54'	Report	Schubert 31', 43'; Reece 45'

Stadium:
National Hockey Centre, Canberra

2 March 2008
11:00

WA Thundersticks (Western Australia)	4–2	(Tasmania) Tassie Tigers
Blakeney 11'; Bausor 29', 32'; Smith 62'	Report	Richardson 18'; Ockenden 44'

Stadium:
National Hockey Centre, Canberra

2 March 2008
13:00

Canberra Lakers (Australian Capital Territory)	4–3	(New South Wales) NSW Waratahs
Turner 12'; Backhus 47', 79'; Davidson 48'	Report	Sutherland 8'; M. Paterson 15'; Livermore 18'

Stadium:
National Hockey Centre, Canberra

2 March 2008
15:00

VIC Vikings (Victoria (state))	2–5	(Queensland) QLD Blades
Pollard 15', 28'	Report	Eglington 5', 48'; Dwyer 35'; T. Bates 52'; Elder 58'

Stadium:
National Hockey Centre, Canberra

2 March 2008
17:00

NT Stingers (Northern Territory)	2–3	(South Australia) Southern Hotshots
Abbott 29', 69'	Report	Schubert 7'; Hughes 12'; Magee 46'

Stadium:
National Hockey Centre, Canberra

4 March 2008
11:00

Canberra Lakers (Australian Capital Territory)	4–2	(Northern Territory) NT Stingers
Hinde 2'; MacKinnon 17', 59'; Davidson 40'	Report	Lockley 3'; Robertson 23'

Stadium:
National Hockey Centre, Canberra

4 March 2008
13:00

Southern Hotshots (South Australia)	4–3	(Tasmania) Tassie Tigers
Magee 22'; Hughes 46'; Reece 65'; Schubert 78'	Report	Guest 20', 31'; Cock 34'

Stadium:
National Hockey Centre, Canberra

4 March 2008
15:00

NSW Waratahs (New South Wales)	0–1	(Victoria (state)) VIC Vikings
	Report	Doerner 70'

Stadium:
National Hockey Centre, Canberra

4 March 2008
17:00

WA Thundersticks (Western Australia)	2–3	(Queensland) QLD Blades
Kavanagh 4', 43'	Report	Dwyer 43'; De Young 54'; Eglington 80'

Stadium:
National Hockey Centre, Canberra

5 March 2008
11:00

Southern Hotshots (South Australia)	0–4	(Victoria (state)) VIC Vikings
	Report	Kleinschmidt; T. Brooks 38'; Pollard 55'; Mirecki 70'

Stadium:
National Hockey Centre, Canberra

5 March 2008
13:00

NT Stingers (Northern Territory)	0–7	(New South Wales) NSW Waratahs
	Report	Poulton 5'; I. Paterson 25'; Orchard 27', 61'; Naylor 30'; Matheson 42'; Butturini 44'

Stadium:
National Hockey Centre, Canberra

5 March 2008
15:00

WA Thundersticks (Western Australia)	1–0	(Australian Capital Territory) Canberra Lakers
Blakeney 13'	Report

Stadium:
National Hockey Centre, Canberra

5 March 2008
17:00

QLD Blades (Queensland)	4–5	(Tasmania) Tassie Tigers
Burns 6'; De Young 9'; T. Bates 15', 47'	Report	Cock 13', 35', 44'; Richardson 58'; Guest 78'

Stadium:
National Hockey Centre, Canberra

=== Classification round ===
==== Fifth to eighth place classification ====
Crossover
7 March 2008
(South Australia) Southern Hotshots	3
(Northern Territory) NT Stingers	2
7 March 2008
(Australian Capital Territory) Canberra Lakers	2
(New South Wales) NSW Waratahs	4

Fifth Place
8 March 2008
(South Australia) Southern Hotshots	1
(New South Wales) NSW Waratahs	5
Seventh Place
8 March 2008
(Northern Territory) NT Stingers	0
(Australian Capital Territory) Canberra Lakers	4

===== Crossover =====
7 March 2008
11:00

Southern Hotshots (South Australia)	3–2	(Northern Territory) NT Stingers
Cleghorn 23', 50'; Magee 66'	Report	Brown 61'; Bransgrove 70'

Stadium:
National Hockey Centre, Canberra

7 March 2008
13:00

Canberra Lakers (Australian Capital Territory)	2–4	(New South Wales) NSW Waratahs
Backhus 26'; Hinde 70'	Report	Livermore 38'; Sutherland 44'; Naylor 65'; Butturini 70'

Stadium:
National Hockey Centre, Canberra

===== Seventh and eighth place =====
8 March 2008
11:00

NT Stingers (Northern Territory)	0–4	(Australian Capital Territory) Canberra Lakers
	Report	Backhus 45'; Dent 50'; Hinde 57'; M. Hotchkis 61'

Stadium:
National Hockey Centre, Canberra

===== Fifth and sixth place =====
8 March 2008
13:00

Southern Hotshots (South Australia)	1–5	(New South Wales) NSW Waratahs
Kelly 31'	Report	M. Paterson 14', 23', 39'; Sutherland 58'; Booth 70'

Stadium:
National Hockey Centre, Canberra

==== First to fourth place classification ====
Semi-finals
7 March 2008
(Queensland) QLD Blades	3
(Tasmania) Tassie Tigers	1
7 March 2008
(Victoria (state)) VIC Vikings	1
(Western Australia) WA Thundersticks	2

Final
8 March 2008
(Queensland) QLD Blades	2
(Western Australia) WA Thundersticks	4
Third Place
8 March 2008
(Tasmania) Tassie Tigers	1
(Victoria (state)) VIC Vikings	3

===== Semi-finals =====
7 March 2008
15:00

QLD Blades (Queensland)	3–1	(Tasmania) Tassie Tigers
Wilson 46'; Eglington 46', 54'	Report	Tremayne 64'

Stadium:
National Hockey Centre, Canberra

7 March 2008
17:00

VIC Vikings (Victoria (state))	1–2	(Western Australia) WA Thundersticks
Doerner 53'	Report	Hulbert 22'; Blakeney 30'

Stadium:
National Hockey Centre, Canberra

===== Third and fourth place =====
8 March 2008
15:00

Tassie Tigers (Tasmania)	1–3	(Victoria (state)) VIC Vikings
Guest 8'	Report	J. Brooks 1'; Doerner 56'; Geraghty 67'

Stadium:
National Hockey Centre, Canberra

===== Final =====
8 March 2008
17:00

QLD Blades (Queensland)	2–4	(Western Australia) WA Thundersticks
Elder 2'; Eglington 69'	Report	Dancer 22'; Charlesworth 54'; Smith 59'; Hopkins 63'

Stadium:
National Hockey Centre, Canberra

== Awards ==
Player of the Tournament	Top Goalscorer	Player of the Final
(Western Australia) Bevan George	(Victoria (state)) Luke Doerner	(Western Australia) Aaron Hopkins

== Statistics ==
=== Final standings ===
Pos	Team	Pld	W	WD	LD	L	GF	GA	GD	Pts	Qualification
1st place, gold medalist(s)	(Western Australia) WA Thundersticks	9	6	0	1	2	23	11	+12	19	Gold Medal
2nd place, silver medalist(s)	(Queensland) QLD Blades	9	7	0	0	2	33	19	+14	21	Silver Medal
3rd place, bronze medalist(s)	(Victoria (state)) VIC Vikings	9	6	1	0	2	26	11	+15	20	Bronze Medal
4	(Tasmania) Tassie Tigers	9	4	0	0	5	21	24	−3	12	
5	(New South Wales) NSW Waratahs	9	3	0	0	6	22	20	+2	9	
6	(South Australia) Southern Hotshots	9	5	0	0	4	21	27	−6	15	
7	(Australian Capital Territory) Canberra Lakers	9	4	0	0	5	23	22	+1	12	
8	(Northern Territory) NT Stingers	9	0	0	0	9	7	42	−35	0	

Source: Clearing House

=== Goalscorers ===
There were 176 goals scored in 36 matches, for an average of 4.89 goals per match.

9 goals

- (Victoria (state)) Luke Doerner

8 goals

- (Queensland) Troy Elder

7 goals

- (Queensland) Nathan Eglington
- (Tasmania) David Guest

5 goals

- (New South Wales) Troy Sutherland
- (Queensland) Jamie Dwyer
- (South Australia) Grant Schubert
- (Tasmania) Geoffrey Cock
- (Western Australia) Peter Blakeney
- (Western Australia) Fergus Kavanagh

4 goals

- (Australian Capital Territory) Garry Backhus
- (Australian Capital Territory) Iain Davidson
- (Australian Capital Territory) Glenn Turner
- (New South Wales) Mark Paterson
- (South Australia) Thomas Cleghorn
- (South Australia) Gregory Reece
- (Victoria (state)) Travis Brooks
- (Western Australia) Andrew Smith

3 goals

- (Australian Capital Territory) Kenji Hinde
- (New South Wales) Brent Livermore
- (Queensland) Timothy Bates
- (Queensland) Jacob Burns
- (Queensland) Liam de Young
- (South Australia) Eugene Magee
- (Tasmania) Edward Ockenden
- (Tasmania) Marcus Richardson
- (Victoria (state)) Joshua Pollard

2 goals

- (Australian Capital Territory) Paul MacKinnon
- (New South Wales) Matthew Butturini
- (New South Wales) Matthew Naylor
- (New South Wales) Simon Orchard
- (Northern Territory) Desmond Abbott
- (Northern Territory) Gary Robertson
- (Queensland) Michael Bates
- (South Australia) Scott Hughes
- (Tasmania) Paul Ancher
- (Victoria (state)) Jason Brooks
- (Victoria (state)) Declan Geraghty
- (Victoria (state)) Aaron Kleinschmidt
- (Victoria (state)) Alistair McLennan
- (Victoria (state)) Daniel Mirecki
- (Western Australia) Christopher Bausor
- (Western Australia) Brent Dancer
- (Western Australia) Aaron Hopkins

1 goal

- (Australian Capital Territory) Benjamin Bishop
- (Australian Capital Territory) Craig Dent
- (Australian Capital Territory) Daniel Hotchkis
- (Australian Capital Territory) Matthew Hotchkis
- (Australian Capital Territory) Christopher Jorgensen
- (Australian Capital Territory) Seyi Onitiri
- (New South Wales) Darryn Booth
- (New South Wales) Eli Matheson
- (New South Wales) Ian Paterson
- (New South Wales) Benjamin Poulton
- (Northern Territory) Douglas Bransgrove
- (Northern Territory) Liam Brown
- (Northern Territory) Adrian Lockley
- (Queensland) Dean Butler
- (Queensland) Jason Wilson
- (South Australia) Joel Dry
- (South Australia) Peter Kelly
- (South Australia) Robert Porter
- (Tasmania) Nicholas Tremayne
- (Western Australia) Kiel Brown
- (Western Australia) Jonathon Charlesworth
- (Western Australia) Phillip Hulbert

Source: Clearing House
