= 2015 Men's Australian Hockey League =

Tournament details
- Host country: Australia
- City: Darwin
- Dates: 25 September – 2 October 2015
- Teams: 8
- Venue: Marrara Hockey Centre

Final positions
- Champions: (Queensland) QLD Blades (9th title)
- Runner-up: (Western Australia) WA Thundersticks
- Third place: (Tasmania) Tassie Tigers

Tournament statistics
- Matches played: 24
- Goals scored: 123 (5.13 per match)
- Top scorer: (New South Wales) Blake Govers (10 goals)
- Best player: (Tasmania) Eddie Ockenden

The 2015 Men's Australian Hockey League was the 25th edition of the Australian Hockey League men's Field Hockey tournament. The tournament was held in the Northern Territory city of Darwin.

The QLD Blades won the tournament for the ninth time after defeating the WA Thundersticks 2–1 in the final. The Tassie Tigers won the bronze medal after defeating the VIC Vikings 4–3 in the third place match.

== Competition format ==
The tournament is divided into two pools, Pool A and Pool B, consisting of four teams in a round robin format. Teams then progress into either Pool C, the medal round, or Pool D, the classification round. Teams carry over points from their previous match ups, and contest teams they are yet to play.

The top two teams in pools A and B progress to Pool C. The top two teams in Pool C continue to contest the Final, while the bottom two teams of Pool C play in the Third and Fourth place match.

The remaining bottom placing teams make up Pool D. The top two teams in Pool D play in the Fifth and Sixth place match, while the bottom two teams of Pool C play in the Seventh and Eighth place match.

== Teams ==
- (Australian Capital Territory) Canberra Lakers
- (New South Wales) NSW Waratahs
- (Northern Territory) NT Stingers
- (Queensland) QLD Blades
- (South Australia) SA Hotshots
- (Tasmania) Tassie Tigers
- (Victoria (state)) VIC Vikings
- (Western Australia) WA Thundersticks

== Results ==
=== First round ===
==== Pool A ====
Pos	Team	Pld	W	D	L	GF	GA	GD	Pts	Qualification
1	(Queensland) QLD Blades	3	3	0	0	9	4	+5	9	Advance to Medal Round
2	(Tasmania) Tassie Tigers	3	2	0	1	9	5	+4	6	Advance to Medal Round
3	(New South Wales) NSW Waratahs	3	1	0	2	12	10	+2	3	
4	(South Australia) SA Hotshots	3	0	0	3	3	14	−11	0	

Source: Hockey Australia

25 September 2015
14:00

NSW Waratahs (New South Wales)	7–2	(South Australia) SA Hotshots
Ogilvie 11'; Elliott 18', 48'; K. Govers 22'; B. Govers 30', 45', 54'	Report	White 53'; Larwood 58'

Umpires:
Adam Barry (AUS)
Jeremy Coleman (AUS)

25 September 2015
16:00

Tassie Tigers (Tasmania)	1–2	(Queensland) QLD Blades
Ockenden 37'	Report	Dwyer 22'; Kenny 53'

Umpires:
Murray Grime (AUS)
Glen Munday (AUS)

26 September 2015
14:00

Tassie Tigers (Tasmania)	4–1	(South Australia) SA Hotshots
Boulton 8'; Mackey 47', 48'; Dick 54'	Report	Joyce 55'

Umpires:
Stephen Versteegh (AUS)
Zeke Newman (AUS)

26 September 2015
16:00

QLD Blades (Queensland)	4–3	(New South Wales) NSW Waratahs
Imer 8'; Gohdes 13'; Dwyer 36'; Cramer 53'	Report	Hill 35'; Craig 40'; Orchard 43'

Umpires:
Tim Pullman (AUS)
Scott Embry (AUS)

28 September 2015
18:00

Tassie Tigers (Tasmania)	4–2	(New South Wales) NSW Waratahs
Dick 12'; Ockenden 14'; Mackey 17'; Cock 34'	Report	Craig 38'; B. Govers 46'

Umpires:
Glen Munday (AUS)
Adam Kearns (AUS)

28 September 2015
20:00

QLD Blades (Queensland)	3–0	(South Australia) SA Hotshots
Whetton 16', 59'; Dwyer 30'	Report

Umpires:
Jeremy Coleman (AUS)
Zeke Newman (AUS)

==== Pool B ====
Pos	Team	Pld	W	D	L	GF	GA	GD	Pts	Qualification
1	(Western Australia) WA Thundersticks	3	3	0	0	13	6	+7	9	Advance to Medal Round
2	(Victoria (state)) VIC Vikings	3	1	1	1	12	9	+3	4	Advance to Medal Round
3	(Australian Capital Territory) Canberra Lakers	3	0	2	1	3	6	−3	2	
4	(Northern Territory) NT Stingers	3	0	1	2	4	11	−7	1	

Source: Hockey Australia

25 September 2015
18:00

WA Thundersticks (Western Australia)	6–4	(Victoria (state)) VIC Vikings
Main 17'; Wickham 21'; Mitton 37'; Bausor 41'; Bates 43', 58'	Report	Webster 23'; Ciriello 51'; Simpson 51'; Kleinschmidt 57'

Umpires:
Andrew Hickman (AUS)
Zeke Newman (AUS)

25 September 2015
20:00

NT Stingers (Northern Territory)	1–1	(Australian Capital Territory) Canberra Lakers
Duguid 32'	Report	Sutherland 33'

Umpires:
Tim Pullman (AUS)
Stephen Versteegh (AUS)

26 September 2015
18:00

WA Thundersticks (Western Australia)	3–0	(Australian Capital Territory) Canberra Lakers
Wickham 2', 47'; Bates 58'	Report

Umpires:
Adam Kearns (AUS)
Adam Barry (AUS)

26 September 2015
20:00

VIC Vikings (Victoria (state))	6–1	(Northern Territory) NT Stingers
Pollard 5'; Randhawa 29'; Ciriello 40'; Arunasalam 43'; Kleinschmidt 46'; Simmonds 49'	Report	Lockley 22'

Umpires:
Murray Grime (AUS)
Jeremy Coleman (AUS)

28 September 2015
14:00

VIC Vikings (Victoria (state))	2–2	(Australian Capital Territory) Canberra Lakers
Kleinschmidt 14'; Pollard 31'	Report	Sutherland 18'; Kershaw 44'

Umpires:
Stephen Versteegh (AUS)
Scott Embry (AUS)

28 September 2015
16:00

WA Thundersticks (Western Australia)	4–2	(Northern Territory) NT Stingers
Zalewski 17'; Mitton 19', 59'; Harvie 34'	Report	Hullick 52'; Duguid 57'

Umpires:
Andrew Hickman (AUS)
Adam Barry (AUS)

=== Second round ===
==== Pool C (Medal Round) ====
Pos	Team	Pld	W	D	L	GF	GA	GD	Pts
1	(Queensland) QLD Blades	3	3	0	0	7	2	+5	9
2	(Western Australia) WA Thundersticks	3	2	0	1	9	7	+2	6
3	(Victoria (state)) VIC Vikings	3	1	0	2	8	10	−2	3
4	(Tasmania) Tassie Tigers	3	0	0	3	3	8	−5	0

Source: Hockey Australia

29 September 2015
18:00

Tassie Tigers (Tasmania)	1–3	(Victoria (state)) VIC Vikings
Ockenden 59'	Report	Simpson 9'; Ciriello 33'; Simmonds 53'

Umpires:
Adam Kearns (AUS)
Stephen Versteegh (AUS)

29 September 2015
20:00

QLD Blades (Queensland)	2–0	(Western Australia) WA Thundersticks
Knowles 19'; Whetton 47'	Report

Umpires:
Tim Pullman (AUS)
Zeke Newman (AUS)

1 October 2015
18:00

WA Thundersticks (Western Australia)	3–1	(Tasmania) Tassie Tigers
Wickham 12'; Bausor 29'; Bates 46'	Report	Welch 27'

Umpires:
Adam Barry (AUS)
Adam Kearns (AUS)

1 October 2015
20:00

QLD Blades (Queensland)	3–1	(Victoria (state)) VIC Vikings
Wotherspoon 15', 24'; Dwyer 47'	Report	Ciriello 21'

Umpires:
Murray Grimes (AUS)
Tim Pullman (AUS)

==== Pool D (Classification Round) ====
Pos	Team	Pld	W	D	L	GF	GA	GD	Pts
1	(New South Wales) NSW Waratahs	3	3	0	0	17	3	+14	9
2	(Australian Capital Territory) Canberra Lakers	3	1	1	1	4	7	−3	4
3	(South Australia) SA Hotshots	3	1	0	2	6	11	−5	3
4	(Northern Territory) NT Stingers	3	0	1	2	3	9	−6	1

Source: Hockey Australia

29 September 2015
14:00

NSW Waratahs (New South Wales)	5–1	(Australian Capital Territory) Canberra Lakers
B. Govers 9'; K. Govers 34'; Craig 39'; Orchard 43'; White 57'	Report	J. Staines 14'

Marrara Hockey Centre
Umpires:
Glen Munday (AUS)
Jeremy Coleman (AUS)

29 September 2015
16:00

SA Hotshots (South Australia)	3–2	(Northern Territory) NT Stingers
Powardy 39', 47'; White 42'	Report	Boyde 46', 53'

Umpires:
Andrew Hickman (AUS)
Scott Embry (AUS)

1 October 2015
14:00

Canberra Lakers (Australian Capital Territory)	2–1	(South Australia) SA Hotshots
Kershaw 16'; Sutherland 60'	Report	Wells 54'

Umpires:
Andrew Hickman (AUS)
Scott Embry (AUS)

1 October 2015
16:00

NSW Waratahs (New South Wales)	5–0	(Northern Territory) NT Stingers
K. Govers 34'; Hayes 38', 53'; B. Govers 39', 60'	Report

Umpires:
Glen Munday (AUS)
Jeremy Coleman (AUS)

=== Classification Games ===
==== Seventh and eighth place ====
2 October 2015
14:00

SA Hotshots (South Australia)	5–3	(Northern Territory) NT Stingers
Cox 6'; Larwood 24', 26'; Wyld 28', 39'	Report	Abbott 12', 19'; Lockley 56'

Umpires:
Stephen Versteegh (AUS)
Glen Munday (AUS)

==== Fifth and sixth place ====
2 October 2015
16:00

NSW Waratahs (New South Wales)	7–0	(Australian Capital Territory) Canberra Lakers
Ogilvie 7'; B. Govers 39', 43', 52'; Hayes 54'; Orchard 57'; Hill 60'	Report

Umpires:
Zeke Newman (AUS)
Tim Pullman (AUS)

==== Third and fourth place ====
2 October 2015
18:00

VIC Vikings (Victoria (state))	3–4	(Tasmania) Tassie Tigers
Ellis 15'; Arunasalam 42'; Gilmour 44'	Report	Middleton 29', 51'; Deavin 40'; Dick 53'

Umpires:
Scott Embry (AUS)
Adam Barry (AUS)

==== Final ====
2 October 2015
20:30

QLD Blades (Queensland)	2–1	(Western Australia) WA Thundersticks
Cramer 31', 51'	Report	Bausor 46'

Umpires:
Adam Kearns (AUS)
Murray Grime (AUS)

== Awards ==
Player of the Tournament	Topscorer	Goalkeeper of the Tournament	Player of the Final
(Tasmania) Eddie Ockenden	(New South Wales) Blake Govers	(Australian Capital Territory) Andrew Charter	(Queensland) Cale Cramer

== Statistics ==
=== Final standings ===
Pos	Team	Pld	W	D	L	GF	GA	GD	Pts	Qualification
1st place, gold medalist(s)	(Queensland) QLD Blades	6	6	0	0	16	6	+10	18	Gold Medal
2nd place, silver medalist(s)	(Western Australia) WA Thundersticks	6	4	0	2	17	11	+6	12	Silver Medal
3rd place, bronze medalist(s)	(Tasmania) Tassie Tigers	6	3	0	3	15	14	+1	9	Bronze Medal
4	(Victoria (state)) VIC Vikings	6	2	1	3	19	17	+2	7	
5	(New South Wales) NSW Waratahs	6	4	0	2	29	11	+18	12	
6	(Australian Capital Territory) Canberra Lakers	6	1	2	3	6	19	−13	5	
7	(South Australia) SA Hotshots	6	2	0	4	12	21	−9	6	
8	(Northern Territory) NT Stingers	6	0	1	5	9	24	−15	1	

Source: Hockey Australia

=== Goalscorers ===
There were 123 goals scored in 24 matches, for an average of 5.12 goals per match.

10 goals

- (New South Wales) Blake Govers

4 goals

- (Queensland) Jamie Dwyer
- (Victoria (state)) Chris Ciriello
- (Western Australia) Timothy Bates
- (Western Australia) Tom Wickham

3 goals

- (Australian Capital Territory) Troy Sutherland
- (New South Wales) Tom Craig
- (New South Wales) Kieran Govers
- (New South Wales) Jack Hayes
- (New South Wales) Simon Orchard
- (Queensland) Cale Cramer
- (Queensland) Jacob Whetton
- (South Australia) Luke Larwood
- (Tasmania) James Dick
- (Tasmania) Kurt Mackey
- (Tasmania) Eddie Ockenden
- (Victoria (state)) Aaron Kleinschmidt
- (Western Australia) Chris Bausor
- (Western Australia) Trent Mitton

2 goals

- (Australian Capital Territory) Aaron Kershaw
- (New South Wales) Jack Elliott
- (New South Wales) Nick Hill
- (New South Wales) Flynn Ogilvie
- (Northern Territory) Des Abbott
- (Northern Territory) Scott Boyde
- (Northern Territory) Robert Duguid
- (Northern Territory) Jarrod Lockley
- (Queensland) Dylan Wotherspoon
- (South Australia) Cooper Powardy
- (South Australia) Cameron White
- (South Australia) Ruben Wyld
- (Tasmania) Dougal Middleton
- (Victoria (state)) Kiran Arunasalam
- (Victoria (state)) Joshua Pollard
- (Victoria (state)) Joshua Simmonds
- (Victoria (state)) Glenn Simpson

1 goal

- (Australian Capital Territory) Jake Staines
- (New South Wales) Tristan White
- (Northern Territory) Jamie Hullick
- (Queensland) Matthew Gohdes
- (Queensland) Adam Imer
- (Queensland) Shane Kenny
- (Queensland) Mark Knowles
- (South Australia) Daniel Cox
- (South Australia) Cameron Joyce
- (South Australia) Chris Wells
- (Tasmania) Angus Boulton
- (Tasmania) Geoff Cock
- (Tasmania) Tim Deavin
- (Tasmania) Jack Welch
- (Victoria (state)) Justin Ellis
- (Victoria (state)) Will Gilmour
- (Victoria (state)) Jayshaan Randhawa
- (Victoria (state)) James Webster
- (Western Australia) Jake Harvie
- (Western Australia) Frank Main
- (Western Australia) Aran Zalewski

Source: Hockey Australia
