= 2012 Men's Australian Hockey League =

Sporting league in 2012

Tournament details
- Host country: Australia
- City: Canberra
- Dates: 16–27 October
- Teams: 8
- Venue: National Hockey Centre

Final positions
- Champions: (Queensland) QLD Blades (7th title)
- Runner-up: (Western Australia) WA Thundersticks
- Third place: (Victoria (state)) VIC Vikings

Tournament statistics
- Matches played: 36
- Goals scored: 197 (5.47 per match)
- Top scorer: (Victoria (state)) Chris Ciriello (12 goals)
- Best player: (New South Wales) Simon Orchard

The 2012 Men's Australian Hockey League was the 22nd edition of the men's field hockey tournament. The tournament was held in Australia's capital city, Canberra.

The QLD Blades won the gold medal for the seventh time by defeating the WA Thundersticks 3–2 in the final. VIC Vikings won the bronze medal after defeating the NSW Waratahs 3–1 in the third place match.

== Teams ==
- (Australian Capital Territory) Canberra Lakers
- (South Australia) Southern Hotshots
- (New South Wales) NSW Waratahs
- (Tasmania) Tassie Tigers
- (Northern Territory) NT Stingers
- (Victoria (state)) VIC Vikings
- (Queensland) QLD Blades
- (Western Australia) WA Thundersticks

== Results ==
=== Preliminary round ===
Pos	Team	Pld	W	D	L	GF	GA	GD	Pts	Qualification
1	(Queensland) QLD Blades	7	5	1	1	30	11	+19	16	Advance to Semi-Finals
2	(Western Australia) WA Thundersticks	7	5	0	2	29	15	+14	15	Advance to Semi-Finals
3	(New South Wales) NSW Waratahs	7	5	0	2	27	16	+11	15	Advance to Semi-Finals
4	(Victoria (state)) VIC Vikings	7	4	1	2	26	14	+12	13	Advance to Semi-Finals
5	(Tasmania) Tassie Tigers	7	3	2	2	25	20	+5	11	
6	(South Australia) Southern Hotshots	7	3	0	4	14	20	−6	9	
7	(Australian Capital Territory) Canberra Lakers	7	1	0	6	11	34	−23	3	
8	(Northern Territory) NT Stingers	7	0	0	7	3	35	−32	0	

Source: Clearing House

==== Matches ====
16 October 2012
09:00

Tassie Tigers (Tasmania)	5–3	(Australian Capital Territory) Canberra Lakers
Doerner 9'; Lawler 31'; Budgeon 44'; Boulton 51', 68'	Report	Hotchkis 18'; Lobsey 26'; Baxter 40'

Stadium:
National Hockey Centre, Canberra

16 October 2012
11:00

Southern Hotshots (South Australia)	1–5	(New South Wales) NSW Waratahs
Webber 15'	Report	T. White 3'; Miller 4', 33', 38'; Butturini 25'

Stadium:
National Hockey Centre, Canberra

16 October 2012
13:00

QLD Blades (Queensland)	6–0	(Western Australia) WA Thundersticks
Whetton 5'; Dwyer 19', 33', 46'; Wotherspoon 49'; Gohdes 69'	Report

Stadium:
National Hockey Centre, Canberra

16 October 2012
15:00

VIC Vikings (Victoria (state))	4–0	(Northern Territory) NT Stingers
Pollard 9'; Ford 34'; Ciriello 40', 66'	Report

Stadium:
National Hockey Centre, Canberra

17 October 2012
09:00

NSW Waratahs (New South Wales)	5–3	(Queensland) QLD Blades
Miller 2'; F. Ogilvie 27'; Walters 44'; Govers 60'; Butturini 64'	Report	Dwyer 11'; Beale 40'; Elder 50'

Stadium:
National Hockey Centre, Canberra

17 October 2012
11:00

Tassie Tigers (Tasmania)	3–5	(Western Australia) WA Thundersticks
Doerner 28'; Budgeon 30', 70'	Report	Boyne 13', 52'; Schubert 41', 57'; Burcher 44'

Stadium:
National Hockey Centre, Canberra

17 October 2012
13:00

NT Stingers (Northern Territory)	0–3	(Australian Capital Territory) Canberra Lakers
	Report	Davidson 18'; Pike 35'; Wallace 59'

Stadium:
National Hockey Centre, Canberra

17 October 2012
15:00

VIC Vikings (Victoria (state))	5–2	(South Australia) Southern Hotshots
Simpson 18'; Ciriello 25', 38', 50', 64'	Report	Joyce 34'; Webber 68'

Stadium:
National Hockey Centre, Canberra

18 October 2012
09:00

WA Thundersticks (Western Australia)	6–0	(Northern Territory) NT Stingers
Boyne 20', 35'; Bates 26', 44'; Schubert 39'; Kavanagh 52'	Report

Stadium:
National Hockey Centre, Canberra

18 October 2012
11:00

NSW Waratahs (New South Wales)	4–2	(Tasmania) Tassie Tigers
Buttutini 4'; Pearce 33'; Miller 53', 70'	Report	Doerner 12'; Boulton 56'

Stadium:
National Hockey Centre, Canberra

18 October 2012
13:00

VIC Vikings (Victoria (state))	2–4	(Queensland) QLD Blades
Mirecki 11'; Philpott 32'	Report	Wotherspoon 17'; Elder 39', 57'; De Young 55'

Stadium:
National Hockey Centre, Canberra

18 October 2012
15:00

Southern Hotshots (South Australia)	4–1	(Australian Capital Territory) Canberra Lakers
Cleghorn 27'; Hughes 38'; Joyce 48', 66'	Report	Hawes 14'

Stadium:
National Hockey Centre, Canberra

20 October 2012
09:00

NT Stingers (Northern Territory)	0–3	(South Australia) Southern Hotshots
	Report	Joyce 43'; 68'; Bowden 70'

Stadium:
National Hockey Centre, Canberra

20 October 2012
11:00

QLD Blades (Queensland)	2–2	(Tasmania) Tassie Tigers
Swann 34'; Beale 41'	Report	Lawler 17'; Deavin 36'

Stadium:
National Hockey Centre, Canberra

20 October 2012
13:00

VIC Vikings (Victoria (state))	6–1	(Australian Capital Territory) Canberra Lakers
2'; Webster 17'; Kleinschmidt 29'; Pollard 34'; Ciriello 45', 50'	Report	Jewell 13'

Stadium:
National Hockey Centre, Canberra

20 October 2012
15:00

WA Thundersticks (Western Australia)	4–1	(New South Wales) NSW Waratahs
Bates 17'; Mitton 28'; Boyne 42'; Jacobs 70'	Report	Willis 57'

Stadium:
National Hockey Centre, Canberra

21 October 2012
09:00

Tassie Tigers (Tasmania)	5–1	(South Australia) Southern Hotshots
Doerner 7', 30'; Boulton 17'; Budgeon 29'; Cock 55'	Report	Cleghorn 4'

Stadium:
National Hockey Centre, Canberra

21 October 2012
11:00

QLD Blades (Queensland)	6–0	(Northern Territory) NT Stingers
Wotherspoon 6'; Hammond 17'; Dwyer 28', 59'; Beale 42'; Elder 52'	Report

Stadium:
National Hockey Centre, Canberra

21 October 2012
13:00

Canberra Lakers (Australian Capital Territory)	1–4	(New South Wales) NSW Waratahs
Pike 35'	Report	Miller 3'; Pearce 26'; Tribe 64'; F. Ogilvie 65'

Stadium:
National Hockey Centre, Canberra

21 October 2012
15:00

WA Thundersticks (Western Australia)	4–2	(Victoria (state)) VIC Vikings
Mitton 30', 43'; Boyne 42'; Jacobs 52'	Report	28'; Pollard 38'

Stadium:
National Hockey Centre, Canberra

23 October 2012
09:00

NSW Waratahs (New South Wales)	1–5	(Victoria (state)) VIC Vikings
Butturini 31'	Report	Fraser 9'; Ciriello 40'; Kleinschmidt 44'; Pollard 50'; Guest 54'

Stadium:
National Hockey Centre, Canberra

23 October 2012
11:00

Canberra Lakers (Australian Capital Territory)	1–9	(Western Australia) WA Thundersticks
Hinde 37'	Report	Bausor 4', 46'; Mitton 5'; Bates 11', 51'; Dancer 34'; Park 36'; Boyne 43', 70'

Stadium:
National Hockey Centre, Canberra

23 October 2012
13:00

Southern Hotshots (South Australia)	1–3	(Queensland) QLD Blades
Cleghorn 70'	Report	8'; Knowles 19'; Whetton 40'

Stadium:
National Hockey Centre, Canberra

23 October 2012
15:00

NT Stingers (Northern Territory)	3–6	(Tasmania) Tassie Tigers
Crooks 19'; Hayward 50'; Haami-Jones 53'	Report	Ockenden 8'; Doerner 13', 26', 44'; Budgeon 30'; Deavin 63'

Stadium:
National Hockey Centre, Canberra

24 October 2012
09:00

Canberra Lakers (Australian Capital Territory)	1–6	(Queensland) QLD Blades
Pike 24'	Report	Wotherspoon 6', 70'; Swyer 44', 53'; Posselt 63'; Gohdes 68'

Stadium:
National Hockey Centre, Canberra

24 October 2012
11:00

Southern Hotshots (South Australia)	2–1	(Western Australia) WA Thundersticks
Oliver 51'; Wickham 65'	Report	Jacobs 19'

Stadium:
National Hockey Centre, Canberra

24 October 2012
13:00

Tassie Tigers (Tasmania)	2–2	(Victoria (state)) VIC Vikings
Doerner 13'; Ockenden 70'	Report	MacKinnon 46'; Ciriello 57'

Stadium:
National Hockey Centre, Canberra

24 October 2012
15:00

NSW Waratahs (New South Wales)	7–0	(Northern Territory) NT Stingers
10', 43'; Pearce 14', 18'; Miller 27'; Orchard 60'; K. Ogilvie 69'	Report

Stadium:
National Hockey Centre, Canberra

=== Classification round ===
==== Fifth to eighth place classification ====
Crossover
26 October 2012
(Tasmania) Tassie Tigers	1
(Northern Territory) NT Stingers	2
26 October 2012
(South Australia) Southern Hotshots	2
(Australian Capital Territory) Canberra Lakers	3

Fifth place
27 October 2012
(Northern Territory) NT Stingers	2
(Australian Capital Territory) Canberra Lakers	1
Seventh Place
27 October 2012
(Tasmania) Tassie Tigers	4
(South Australia) Southern Hotshots	1

===== Crossover =====
26 October 2012
09:00

Southern Hotshots (South Australia)	2–3	(Australian Capital Territory) Canberra Lakers
Claxton 16'; Wickham 67'	Report	Hawes 48'; Jorgensen 63'; Jewell 70'

Stadium:
National Hockey Centre, Canberra

26 October 2012
11:00

Tassie Tigers (Tasmania)	1–2	(Northern Territory) NT Stingers
Doerner 33'	Report	Gabriel 8'; Hayward 66'

Stadium:
National Hockey Centre, Canberra

===== Seventh and eighth place =====
27 October 2012
09:00

Tassie Tigers (Tasmania)	4–1	(South Australia) Southern Hotshots
Clifford 16'; Doerner 35'; Budgeon 56'; Ockenden 70'	Report	Joyce 67'

Stadium:
National Hockey Centre, Canberra

===== Fifth and sixth place =====
27 October 2012
11:00

NT Stingers (Northern Territory)	2–1	(Australian Capital Territory) Canberra Lakers
Crooks 6'; A. Lockley 36'	Report	Pike 19'

Stadium:
National Hockey Centre, Canberra

==== First to fourth place classification ====
Semi-finals
26 October 2012
(Queensland) QLD Blades	3
(Victoria (state)) VIC Vikings	0
26 October 2012
(Western Australia) WA Thundersticks	3
(New South Wales) NSW Waratahs	1

Final
27 October 2012
(Queensland) QLD Blades	3
(Western Australia) WA Thundersticks	2
Third Place
27 October 2012
(Victoria (state)) VIC Vikings	3
(New South Wales) NSW Waratahs	1

===== Semi-finals =====
26 October 2012
13:00

WA Thundersticks (Western Australia)	3–1	(New South Wales) NSW Waratahs
Bates 8', 35', 40'	Report	Orchard 5'

Stadium:
National Hockey Centre, Canberra

26 October 2012
15:00

QLD Blades (Queensland)	3–0	(Victoria (state)) VIC Vikings
Whetton 32'; 40'; Dwyer 70'	Report

Stadium:
National Hockey Centre, Canberra

===== Third and fourth place =====
27 October 2012
13:00

VIC Vikings (Victoria (state))	3–1	(New South Wales) NSW Waratahs
Ford 62'; Ciriello 66', 70'	Report	Ogilvie 19'

Stadium:
National Hockey Centre, Canberra

===== Final =====
27 October 2012
15:00

QLD Blades (Queensland)	3–2	(Western Australia) WA Thundersticks
Wotherspoon 12'; Dwyer 26'; Posselt 50'	Report	Boyne 32'; Bausor 56'

Stadium:
National Hockey Centre, Canberra

== Statistics ==
=== Final standings ===
Pos	Team	Pld	W	D	L	GF	GA	GD	Pts	Final Result
1st place, gold medalist(s)	(Queensland) QLD Blades	9	7	1	1	36	13	+23	22	Gold Medal
2nd place, silver medalist(s)	(Western Australia) WA Thundersticks	9	6	0	3	34	19	+15	18	Silver Medal
3rd place, bronze medalist(s)	(Victoria (state)) VIC Vikings	9	5	1	3	29	18	+11	16	Bronze Medal
4	(New South Wales) NSW Waratahs	9	5	0	4	29	22	+7	15	
5	(Northern Territory) NT Stingers	9	2	0	7	7	37	−30	6	
6	(Australian Capital Territory) Canberra Lakers	9	2	0	7	15	38	−23	6	
7	(Tasmania) Tassie Tigers	9	4	2	3	30	23	+7	14	
8	(South Australia) Southern Hotshots	9	3	0	6	17	27	−10	9	

Source: Clearing House
