= Lachlan Vivian-Taylor =

Australian field hockey player

Personal information
- Born: 26 May 1980 (age 46) Melbourne, Australia

Sport
- Sport: Field hockey
- Position: Forward
Senior career
Years	Team	Caps	Goals
1998–2003	Victorian Vikings	-	-
National team
Years	Team	Caps	Goals
1998–2001	Australia	48	(21)
Medal record
Men's field hockey
Representing Australia
Commonwealth Games
Gold medal – first place	1998 Kuala Lumpur	Team
Oceania Cup
Gold medal – first place	1999 Brisbane	Team
Gold medal – first place	2001 Melbourne	Team
FIH Champions Trophy
Gold medal – first place	1999 Brisbane	Team
Bronze medal – third place	1998 Lahore	Team
East Asian Games
Gold medal – first place	2001 Osaka	Team

Lachlan Vivian-Taylor (born 26 May 1980) is a former international field hockey player from Australia.

== Personal life ==
Vivian-Taylor was born and raised in Melbourne, Victoria, Australia.

== Career ==
=== National league ===
In the Australian Hockey League, Vivian-Taylor represented his home state of Victoria. From 1998 until 2003, he was a member of the Victorian Vikings team, also previously known as the Melbourne Redbacks. During his debut season, he helped his team win the title for the second time.

=== Under-21 ===
Vivian-Taylor was a member of the Burras squad at the 2001 FIH Junior World Cup in Hobart, where they finished in sixth place.

=== Kookaburras ===
He made his senior international debut for the Kookaburras in 1998. He earned his first senior cap during a test match against Malaysia in Bukit Jalil. After just three national appearances, he was named in the squad for his first major tournament at the XVI Commonwealth Games in Kuala Lumpur, Malaysia, taking home a gold medal. He followed this up with an appearance at the FIH Champions Trophy in Lahore, where he won a bronze medal.

In 1999, he won two more gold medals at major tournaments with the national team. His first gold of the year came at the inaugural edition of the Oceania Cup held in Brisbane, with his second at the FIH Champions Trophy, also held in Brisbane.

After making sporadic appearances throughout 2000 and 2001, Vivian-Taylor represented the national team for the final time at the 2001 East Asian Games in Osaka, where he won a gold medal. He announced his retirement from international hockey following the 2001 FIH Junior World Cup.
