= National Hockey Centre =

Field hockey stadium in Canberra, Australia

- Interactive map of National Hockey Centre
- Location: 196 Mouat Street, Lyneham, Australian Capital Territory, 2602
- Coordinates: 35°14′40″S 149°07′42″E
- Owner: Government of Australia
- Operator: Hockey ACT
- Capacity: 2,000 (fixed); 3,000 (temporary)

Tenants
- Hockey ACT; AHL (1991–2018): Canberra Lakers (M) and Canberra Strikers (W); Hockey One (2019–): Canberra Chill (M + W)

The National Hockey Centre, is a Hockey ACT owned outdoor field hockey stadium located in Lyneham, a northern suburb of Canberra, Australian Capital Territory. It offers three international standard water-based hockey pitches which are used for both international and domestic competition, as well as training activities.

The stadium is home to the Canberra Chill men's and women's hockey teams in Hockey Australia's premier domestic league, the Sultana Bran Hockey One League.

== Facilities ==
=== Pitches ===
The National Hockey Centre features three international level synthetic pitches. These include the main pitch, Carter Field and two secondary pitches, Powell Field and Watt Field. Carter Field and Powell Field were named in honour of Graham Carter, a member of the ACT Sport Hall of Fame, and Katrina Powell, a former Hockeyroo.

=== Amenities ===
The main building, which sits between the three pitches, houses an array of amenities, including men's and women's change-rooms, both fully equipped with showers and ice-baths, for rehabilitation purposes.

=== Function rooms ===
The National Hockey Centre is home to 'Pick Up Stix Kitchen and Bar', a public sports-bar and café. In addition to this, the café can also host large functions, with a choice of private function rooms housed within the complex.

== Hockey ==
=== International events ===
The National Hockey Centre has only played host to one major international tournament, the 2005 Women's Champions Trophy. In addition to this, the complex has hosted a number of international test–matches, being the home ground for Australia's men's and women's hockey teams, the Kookaburras and Hockeyroos.

=== Domestic competitions ===
The centre has played host to many domestic competitions, from Under–13 level to the Australian Hockey League and Hockey One. Some of these include:

- 2012 Men's Australian Hockey League
- 2015 Men's Under–21 National Championship
- 2018 Men's and Women's Australian Hockey League
- 2019 Men's and Women's Sultana Bran Hockey One League
