= Brendan Garard =

Australian field hockey player

Personal information
- Born: 6 December 1971 (age 54) Brisbane, Queensland, Australia
Medal record
Men's Field Hockey
Representing Australia
Olympic Games
Bronze medal – third place	1996 Atlanta	Team competition

Brendan James Garard (born 6 December 1971 in Brisbane, Queensland) is a former field hockey player from Australia, who was a member of the Men's National Hockey Team that won the bronze medal at the 1996 Summer Olympics in Atlanta, Georgia. He is the husband of international Ironman Triathlete Melissa Ashton.
