= Baeden Choppy =

Australian field hockey player

Personal information
- Born: 18 April 2002 (age 24) Mackay, Queensland, Australia
Medal record
Men's Field Hockey
Representing Australia
Olympic Games
Bronze medal – third place	1996 Atlanta	Team
Champions Trophy
Silver medal – second place	1997 Adelaide	Team

Baeden Ty Choppy (born 14 April 1976 in Mackay, Queensland) is a former field hockey striker from Australia, who was a member of the Men's National Hockey that won the bronze medal at the 1996 Summer Olympics in Atlanta, Georgia.

Since 2004, Baeden has been working as a player-coach to a hockey team competing in the North Premier League, England. In 2017, Baeden returned to playing hockey in the Brisbane hockey league at the Kedron Wavell Wolves, re-uniting with former Olympics team-mate Matthew Smith (field hockey) who is the current top grade coach at that Club.
