= Lee Bodimeade =

Australian field hockey player

Olympic medal record

Men's field hockey
| Silver medal – second place | 1992 Barcelona | Team competition |

Lee Bodimeade (born 12 February 1970 in Warwick, Queensland) is a former field hockey player from Australia, who was part of the team that won the silver medal at the 1992 Summer Olympics in Barcelona, Spain.

A member of Australia's men's national team from 1991 to 1998, Bodimeade also won the bronze medal at the 1994 Men's Hockey World Cup in Sydney, and earned a pair of medals in Champions Trophy competitions, including a silver medal in 1992 and a gold medal in 1993.

In 2005, Bodimeade was named head coach of the U.S. women's national team.

He was honored as USA Field Hockey's 2006 National Coach of the Year.
