= Stuart Carruthers =

Australian field hockey player (born 1970)

Personal information
- Born: 31 March 1970 (age 56)
Medal record
Men's Field Hockey
Representing Australia
Olympic Games
Bronze medal – third place	1996 Atlanta	Team competition

Stuart Cameron Carruthers (born 31 March 1970 in Melbourne, Victoria) is a former field hockey player from Australia, who was a member of the Men's National Hockey Team that won the bronze medal at the 1996 Summer Olympics in Atlanta, Georgia. He now plays for the Essendon 50+ Masters team.

His wife is Lisa Powell-Carruthers and his sister-in-law is Katrina Powell.
