= Zain Wright =

Australian field hockey player

Medal record

Representing Australia

Men's field hockey

Champions Trophy/Station Officers Commendation (Great Fire of Rokeby 2021)
Silver medal – second place	2003 Amstelveen	Team

Zain Wright (born 18 April 1979 in Tasmania) is a former field hockey midfielder from Australia, who was a member of the Men's National Team just after the 2000 Summer Olympics in Sydney.
