= Craig Victory =

Australian field hockey player

Personal information
- Nationality: Australian
- Born: 3 February 1980 (age 46) Australia
Medal record
Men's field hockey
Representing Australia
Olympic Games
Bronze medal – third place	2000 Sydney	Team
Commonwealth Games
Gold medal – first place	2002 Manchester	Team
World Cup
Silver medal – second place	2002 Kuala Lumpur	Team
Champions Trophy
Gold medal – first place	1999 Brisbane	Team
Silver medal – second place	2001 Rotterdam	Team
Silver medal – second place	2003 Amstelveen	Team

Craig Victory (born 3 February 1980 in Adelaide, South Australia) is a field hockey striker from Australia who played 102 international games for the Australia men's national field hockey team, the Kookaburras. He is a Commonwealth Games, World Cup and Champions Trophy Gold Medalist and was an Olympic Bronze Medalist with the Australia men's national field hockey team the Kookaburras at the 2000 in Sydney.

As a successful coach, he has served as head coach of the South Australian Sports Institute (SASI) hockey program, head coach of the 2011 winning SA Suns (formerly Southern Suns) in the Australian Hockey League, Australian Junior Women's coach and assistant coach to the gold medal-winning Hockeyroos at the 2014 Commonwealth Games.

== Personal ==
Craig lives in Adelaide, South Australia.

== Field Hockey - Playing ==
=== Club Hockey ===
Craig played club hockey for the Port Adelaide District Hockey Club Magpies.

=== State Hockey ===
He represented South Australia as part of the Southern Hotshots (now known as the SA Hotshots).

=== International Hockey ===
Craig was a member of the Australia men's national field hockey team the Kookaburras from 1999 to 2006, playing 102 games and scoring 36 goals. He was a part of the bronze medal-winning Men's team at the 2000 Summer Olympics and won a silver and gold medal at the World Cup and Commonwealth Games respectively.

He had his jaw broken following an on field incident involving Pakistan captain Muhammad Saqlain in a match at the Hamburg Masters in August 2005.

International Playing Career tournaments included:

- 1999 Men's Hockey Champions Trophy (Brisbane, AUS) – 1st GOLD
- 2000 Men's Hockey Champions Trophy (Amstelveen, NED) – 5th
- 2000 Summer Olympics (Sydney, AUS) – 3rd BRONZE
- 2001 Men's Hockey Champions Trophy (Rotterdam, NED) – 2nd SILVER
- 2002 Commonwealth Games (Manchester, ENG) – 1st GOLD
- 2002 Men's Hockey World Cup (Kuala Lumpur, MAS) – 2nd SILVER
- 2003 Men's Hockey Champions Trophy (Amstelveen, NED) – 2nd SILVER

== Field Hockey - Coaching ==
=== State Coaching ===
Craig was head hockey coach of the South Australian Sports Institute program and also served as the Hockey SA Game Development Manager in the early/mid 2000s.

He coached the peak South Australian State Representative team, the SA Suns (then Southern Suns) to victory in the 2011 Australian Hockey League.

=== International Coaching ===
Craig was selected as coach of the Australian U21 Junior women's team, the Jillaroos, in January 2013 and coached them until 2016. Key tournaments were:

- 2013 Women's Hockey Junior World Cup (Monchengladbach, Germany) – 6th

He was also a part of the Senior Women's team, the Hockeyroos, staff as assistant coach for:

- 2012–13 Women's FIH Hockey World League Semifinals (London, England) – 1st
- 2012–13 Women's FIH Hockey World League Final (Tucuman, Argentina) – 2nd SILVER
- 2014 Women's Hockey World Cup (The Hague, Netherlands) – 2nd SILVER
- 2014 Commonwealth Games (Glasgow, Scotland) – 1st GOLD
