= Queensland Blades =

Australian field hockey club

- Nickname(s): Blades
- League: Australian Hockey League (AHL)
- Colors: Moroon; White
- Home ground: Hockey Centre, Morningside, Queensland

Personnel
- Captain: Mark Knowles
- Coach: Matthew Wells

The Queensland Blades are a men's Australian field hockey team, representing Queensland in the Australian Hockey League.

The Blades have been the most successful team to play in recent years. Their home ground is the State Hockey Centre at Colmslie in Brisbane, Queensland.

They have also competed under the name Brisbane Baldes. And between the years 1993–2000, Queensland also provided a second team in the National Competition, the North Queensland Barras.

The team were champions in the 2007 AHL final played in Perth, Western Australia on 1 April 2007, beating the WA Thundersticks.

In 2010 the Queensland Blades defeated the New South Wales Waratahs in the AHL final to win the championship.

They have since also won the 2012, 2013 and 2015 editions.

== Season standings ==
Year	Position
1991	Champions
1992	Runners-Up
1993	3rd
1995	Runners-Up
1996	Runners-Up
1997	5th
1998	3rd
1999	Runners-Up
2000	3rd
2001	3rd
2002	Runners-Up
2003	Champions
2004	Champions
2005	Runners-Up
2006	Champions
2007	Champions
2008	Runners-Up
2009	
2010	Champions
2011	
2012	Champions
2013	Champions
2014	4th
2015	Champions
2016	6th
2017	Runners-Up

== 2017 squad ==
No	Player
2	Corey Weyer
3	Tim Howard
4	Hugh Pembroke
5	Troy Elder
7	Joel Rintala
8	Blake Wotherspoon
9	Mark Knowles
10	Robert Bell
11	Jacob Anderson
12	Shane Kenny
13	Scott Boyde
15	Cade Banditt
16	Matthew Finn
19	Matthew Swann
23	Daniel Beale
24	Dylan Wotherspoon
26	Justin Douglas
28	Matthew Pembroke
