= David Guest (field hockey) =

Australian field hockey player

David Guest OLY
Personal information
- Born: 22 August 1981 (age 45) Burnie, Tasmania, Australia
Medal record
Men's field hockey
Representing Australia
Olympic Games
Bronze medal – third place	2008 Beijing	Team
Champions Trophy
Gold medal – first place	2005 Chennai	Team
Silver medal – second place	2007 Kuala Lumpur	Team

David Guest (born 22 August 1981) is an Australian former field hockey midfielder.
