= Michael McCann (field hockey) =

Australian field hockey player

Personal information
- Born: 26 September 1977 (age 49) Sydney, Australia
Medal record
Men's field hockey
Representing Australia
Olympic Games
Gold medal – first place	2004 Athens	Team
World Cup
Silver medal – second place	2002 Kuala Lumpur	Team
Silver medal – second place	2006 Mönchengladbach	Team
Champions Trophy
Gold medal – first place	2005 Chennai	Team
Silver medal – second place	2003 Amstelveen	Team
Commonwealth Games
Gold medal – first place	2002 Manchester	Team
Gold medal – first place	2006 Melbourne	Team

Michael McCann OAM (born 26 September 1977) is a field hockey striker from Sydney, Australia, who won the gold medal with the Australia national field hockey team at the 2004 Summer Olympics in Athens. He was included in the national squad for the Sultan Azlan Shah Cup in 2001 after an impressive national league season netted him the top goal scorer's award.

He retired from international hockey in 2007 after playing 165 games and scoring 72 goals.

== International senior tournaments ==
- 2002 – World Cup, Kuala Lumpur (2nd place)
- 2002 – Commonwealth Games, Manchester (1st place)
- 2002 – Champions Trophy, Cologne (5th place)
- 2003 – Champions Trophy, Amstelveen (2nd place)
- 2004 – Olympic Games, Athens (1st place)
- 2005 – Champions Trophy, Chennai (1st place)
- 2006 – Commonwealth Games, Melbourne (1st place)
- 2006 – Champions Trophy, Terrassa (4th place)
- 2006 – World Cup, Mönchengladbach (2nd place)
