= Matthew Wells (field hockey) =

Australian field hockey player

Personal information
- Born: 2 May 1978 (age 48)
Medal record
Men's field hockey
Representing Australia
Olympic Games
Gold medal – first place	2004 Athens	Team
Bronze medal – third place	2000 Sydney	Team
Bronze medal – third place	2008 Beijing	Team
World Cup
Silver medal – second place	2002 Kuala Lumpur	Team
Champions Trophy
Gold medal – first place	1999 Brisbane	Team
Gold medal – first place	2005 Chennai	Team
Gold medal – first place	2008 Rotterdam	Team
Silver medal – second place	2001 Rotterdam	Team
Silver medal – second place	2003 Amstelveen	Team
Silver medal – second place	2007 Kuala Lumpur	Team
Bronze medal – third place	1998 Lahore	Team
Commonwealth Games
Gold medal – first place	2002 Manchester	Team
Gold medal – first place	2006 Melbourne	Team

Matthew “Flex” Wells OAM (born 2 May 1978 in Hobart, Tasmania) is a field hockey defender from Australia, who was a member of the team that won the gold medal at the 2004 Summer Olympics in Athens by beating title holders The Netherlands in the final. Four years earlier, when Sydney hosted the Summer Games, he finished in third spot with The Kookaburras, as the Men's National Team is called. He had to miss the 2006 Men's Hockey World Cup due to injury.
