= Nathan Eglington =

Australian field hockey player

Medal record

Men's field hockey

Representing Australia

Olympic Games
Gold medal – first place	2004 Athens	Team

World Cup
Silver medal – second place	2006 Mönchengladbach	Team

Champions Trophy
Gold medal – first place	2005 Chennai	Team
Silver medal – second place	2003 Amstelveen	Team
Silver medal – second place	2007 Kuala Lumpur	Team

Commonwealth Games
Gold medal – first place	2006 Melbourne	Team

Nathan Eglington OAM (born 2 December 1980 in Murwillumbah, New South Wales) is a field hockey midfielder and striker from Australia, who was a member of the team that won the golden medal at the 2004 Summer Olympics in Athens.

He is nicknamed Eggy, and played domestic hockey for the Queensland Blades in his native country Australia, with whom he won the national title in 2003, 2004, 2006 and 2007. Eglington made his international debut in 2002, in a test series game against South Korea in Adelaide, scoring twice.

Eglington played 140 times for Australia scoring 50 goals before major injury prior to the 2008 Beijing Olympics, forced retirement from international competition at the age of 27 years.

In 2025, Eglington was added to the Hockey Australia Hall of Fame.

He is married to fellow former Australian representative, Lisa Eglington. The pair live in Tweed Heads with their two children.
