= Southern Hotshots =

Australian field hockey club

- League: Australian Hockey League
- Home ground: State Hockey Centre

The Southern Hotshots are a men's Australian field hockey team, representing South Australia in the Australian Hockey League.

The 4,000-capacity State Hockey Centre is their home stadium.

Southern Hotshots hockey team
Players	Coaches
Kent Haigh; David Reid; Dylan Evans; Fraser Bowden; Faizal Saari; Daniel Mitchell; Matthew Claxton; Daniel Cox; Scott Germein; Scott Hughes; Cameron Joyce; Michael Lubcke; Matthew McGregor; Alastair Oliver; Brady O'Shea; Lachlan Seabrook; Andrew Searle; Jake Stacy; Glyn Tamlin; William Telfer; Mohamad Sukri Abdul Mutalib; Tom Wickham; Ian Wishart	Head coach: Nick Lenoir

== Notable players ==
Notable players who have played for the Southern Hotshots include:

- Paul Lewis
- Grant Schubert
- Craig Victory

== Coaches ==
Head Coaches of the SA Hotshots have been:

- Melody Cooper from 2014 to 2016 Co-Head Coach with Mark Victory

== Home Stadium ==
The team's home stadium is the State Hockey Centre (South Australia) (also known as the Pines Stadium) which is located north of the Adelaide CBD in Gepps Cross. The stadium has a capacity of about 4,000 with 330 permanent seats. The stadium was used for the 1997 Men's Hockey Champions Trophy.

== Honour Roll ==
AHL Championships:	none
AHL Finals Appearances:	none
AHL Podium Finishes:	1991 (3rd), 1992 (3rd), 1996 (3rd)
AHL Player of the Tournament:	none
