= New South Wales Waratahs (field hockey) =

NSW Waratahs
Nickname	Waratahs
Association	Hockey Australia; AHL
Coach	Aaron Oman
Assistant Coach	Barry Reid
Home Ground	Sydney Olympic Park Hockey Centre
Home colours / Away colours

The Waratahs were a men's Australian field hockey team, representing New South Wales in the Australian Hockey League, they played at the Sydney Olympic Park Hockey Centre. After the AHL ceased operation in 2018, the Waratahs, and the Arrows, were replaced by the NSW Pride in the new Hockey One competition.
