= WA Thundersticks =

Australian field hockey club

Perth Thundersticks
- Full name: Perth Thundersticks
- League: Hockey One
- Founded: 1991; 35 years ago
- Home ground: Perth Hockey Stadium, Perth, Western Australia (Capacity 6,000)
- Website: hockeywa.org.au

Perth Thundersticks is an Australian field hockey club based in Perth, Western Australia. The club was established in 1991 as a men's only team competing in the Australian Hockey League before expanding to include women's teams, WA Diamonds, under the same banner as part of the 7 clubs to compete in Hockey Australia's new premier domestic competition, Hockey One.

Perth Thundersticks will compete for the first time in the inaugural season of Hockey One, which will be contested from late September through to mid November 2019.

The Thundersticks were one of the most successful teams in the history of the Australian Hockey League, winning nine men's titles and producing countless international players.

== Uniform ==
The club colours are WA's traditional colours, black, gold and white.

Perth Thundersticks men's uniform	Perth Thundersticks women's uniform

== Home Stadium ==
Perth Thundersticks are based out of the Perth Hockey Stadium in Western Australia's capital city, Perth. The stadium has a capacity of 6,000 spectators.

Throughout the Hockey One league, Perth Thundersticks will play a number of home games at the stadium.

== Teams ==
=== Men's team ===
Details and team rosters to be confirmed.

=== Women's team ===
Details and team rosters to be confirmed.

== History ==
Perth Thundersticks, along with six other teams, are part of Hockey Australia's development of hockey. The club unites both WA's male and female teams, with the women's team previously being known as the WA Diamonds.

The club name and identity celebrates the Thundersticks' success from the 1990s and 2000s when they were a dominant force in the men's Australian Hockey League. The club retained the state's iconic black, gold and white colours.

Old WA Thundersticks club logo

Year	Position
1992	Champions
1993	Champions
1995	Champions
1996	4th
1997	Runners-up
1998	4th
1999	Champions
2000	Champions
2001	Runners-up
2002	Champions
2003	Runners-up
2004	Runners-up
2005	3rd
2006	4th
2007	Runners-up
2008	Champions
2009	Champions
2010	4th
2011	Champions
2012	Runners-up
2013	7th
2014	Runners-up
