= Canberra Lakers =

Australian field hockey club

- League: Australian Hockey League
- Founded: 1991
- Home arena: National Hockey Centre
- Head coach: Ben Bishop
- Captain: Josh Hawes
- Website: Official website

The Canberra Lakers (for sponsorship reasons referred to as Canberra Labor Club Lakers) are an Australian hockey team based in Canberra, Australian Capital Territory that play in the Australian Hockey League.
