= Victorian Vikings =

Australian field hockey club

- Full name: Victorian Vikings Hockey Club
- Nickname(s): Vikings
- League: Australian Hockey League
- Founded: 1991; 34 years ago
- Home ground: State Netball and Hockey Centre; Melbourne, Australia (Capacity 7,500)
Home	Away

The Victorian Vikings are a field hockey team which participate in Australia's national field hockey league, the AHL. The team is mostly made up of amateurs who participate in the Victorian State League Division 1. Previous to being known as the Victorian Vikings, the Victorian team have been referred to Melbourne Redbacks, VIS Redbacks and Azuma Vikings. The team's home stadium is the Victorian State Netball and Hockey Centre.

== Championships ==
Since their inception in the inaugural 1991 season, the Vikings have won 2 championships; the fourth most of any club in the league. These two championships came in the 1996 and 1998 competitions. They came second in 1991 season and have finished in 3rd place on numerous occasions.

== 2009 squad ==
Player	Victorian Club
Angus Allen	KEW
Lachlan Anderson	Essendon
George Bazeley	Hawthorn
Andrew Beck	Greensborough
Chris Ciriello	Doncaster
Brett Dempster	Doncaster
Luke Doerner	Waverley
Russell Ford	Doncaster
Declan Geraghty	Camberwell
Matthew Guest	Altona
Corey Joseph	Waverley
Malcolm Kemp	Greensborough
Aaron Kleinschmidt	TEM
Paul Mackinnon	Hawthorn
Alistair McKlennan	Essendon
Josh Pollard	Greensborough
David Pruden	Essendon
Tom Scott	Waverley
Glenn Simpson	Greensborough
Heath Simpson	Greensborough
Ian Smyth	Greensborough
Tim Snow	Doncaster
Will Unkles	Camberwell
James Webster	Camberwell

== Notable players ==
Player
Stephen Mowlam
Jay Stacy
Colin Batch
Luke Doerner
Chris Ciriello
Andrew Smith
Jeremy Hiskins
David Shaw
Aaron Kleinshmidt
Travis Brooks
Glenn Simpson
Russell Ford
George Bazeley

== Stadium ==
The team's home ground is the State Netball and Hockey Centre. which is located within a kilometre of the Melbourne CBD. The stadium has a capacity of about 4,500 with 1000 seats however capacity is expanded through temporary seating for big tournaments. The stadium was used for the 2006 Commonwealth games and will host the 2009 Champions league.

== Women's team ==
Since the women's competition was included into the AHL in 1993, the Victorian Vipers have experienced varying levels of success. The solitary championship was won in 2003. Notable women in the team which have represented the Hockeyroos include Louise Dobson and Rachel Imison.
