= 2007 Men's Australian Hockey League =

Tournament details
- Host country: Australia
- Dates: 23 February – 1 April
- Teams: 8

Final positions
- Champions: (Queensland) QLD Blades (5th title)
- Runner-up: (Western Australia) WA Thundersticks
- Third place: (Victoria (state)) VIC Vikings

Tournament statistics
- Matches played: 52
- Goals scored: 273 (5.25 per match)
- Top scorer(s): (Tasmania) Marcus Richardson (12 goals)
- Best player: (Western Australia) Bevan George

The 2007 Men's Australian Hockey League was the 17th edition of the men's field hockey tournament. The tournament was held from 23 February through to 1 April 2007 at various venues, before culminating in Perth for the finals.

QLD Blades won the tournament for the fifth time after defeating the WA Thundersticks 1–0 in the final. VIC Vikings finished in third place after defeating the Tassie Tigers 5–4 in the third and fourth place playoff.

== Participating teams ==
- (Australian Capital Territory) Canberra Lakers
- (New South Wales) NSW Waratahs
- (Northern Territory) Territory Stingers
- (Queensland) QLD Blades
- (South Australia) Adelaide Hotshots
- (Tasmania) Tassie Tigers
- (Victoria (state)) VIC Vikings
- (Western Australia) WA Thundersticks

== Competition format ==
The 2007 Men's Australian Hockey League consisted of a single round robin format, followed by classification matches.

Teams from all 8 states and territories competed against one another throughout the pool stage. At the conclusion of the pool stage, the top four ranked teams progressed to the semi-finals, while the bottom four teams continued to the classification stage.

The first four rounds of the pool stage comprised two-legged fixtures between states. As a result, matches in rounds five to seven of the pool stage were worth double points, due to the single-leg format.

=== Point allocation ===
Points
| W | WD | LD | L |
|---|---|---|---|
| 3 | 2 | 1 | 0 |

Every match in the 2007 AHL needed an outright result. In the event of a draw, golden goal extra time was played out, and if the result was still a draw a penalty shoot-out was contested, with the winner receiving a bonus point.

== Results ==
=== Preliminary round ===
==== Pool ====
| Pos | Team | Pld | W | WD | LD | L | GF | GA | GD | Pts | Qualification |
|---|---|---|---|---|---|---|---|---|---|---|---|
| 1 | (Queensland) QLD Blades | 11 | 6 | 3 | 1 | 1 | 37 | 16 | +21 | 34 | Semi-finals |
| 2 | (Victoria (state)) VIC Vikings | 11 | 6 | 1 | 1 | 3 | 31 | 26 | +5 | 30 | Semi-finals |
| 3 | (Western Australia) WA Thundersticks | 11 | 6 | 0 | 1 | 4 | 28 | 19 | +9 | 25 | Semi-finals |
| 4 | (Tasmania) Tassie Tigers | 11 | 6 | 1 | 0 | 4 | 32 | 29 | +3 | 23 | Semi-finals |
| 5 | (New South Wales) NSW Waratahs | 11 | 5 | 1 | 2 | 3 | 36 | 28 | +8 | 22 | |
| 6 | (Australian Capital Territory) Canberra Lakers | 11 | 3 | 1 | 3 | 4 | 27 | 36 | −9 | 20 | |
| 7 | (Northern Territory) Territory Stingers | 11 | 3 | 2 | 1 | 5 | 23 | 36 | −13 | 14 | |
| 8 | (South Australia) Adelaide Hotshots | 11 | 0 | 0 | 0 | 11 | 17 | 41 | −24 | 0 | |

Source: Clearing House
Rules for classification: 1) points; 2) goal difference; 3) matches won; 4) goals scored; 5) head-to-head result.

==== Fixtures ====
23 February 2007
20:00 (AWST)

| WA Thundersticks (Western Australia) | 2–1 | (Victoria (state)) VIC Vikings |
|---|---|---|
| M. Boyce 1'; Jacobs 48' | Report | Smith 52' |

Perth Hockey Stadium, Perth
Umpires:
Daniel Johnston (AUS)
Cameron Scadding (AUS)

24 February 2007
16:00 (AEDT)

| Canberra Lakers (Australian Capital Territory) | 1–7 | (Queensland) QLD Blades |
|---|---|---|
| Davidson 34' | Report | Wilson 5', 8', 37'; Burns 34', 35', 51'; T. Bates 58' |

National Hockey Centre, Canberra
Umpires:
David Gentles (AUS)
Kieren Deland (AUS)

24 February 2007
17:00 (ACST)

| Territory Stingers (Northern Territory) | 1–3 | (Tasmania) Tassie Tigers |
|---|---|---|
| Abbott 60' | Report | Ancher 23'; Richardson 28'; Cock 55' |

Marrara Hockey Centre, Darwin
Umpires:
Paul Ludwig (AUS)
Stephen Rogers (AUS)

24 February 2007
18:00 (ACDT)

| Adelaide Hotshots (South Australia) | 3–5 | (New South Wales) NSW Waratahs |
|---|---|---|
| Cleghorn 5'; Porter 33'; Jeffrey 58' | Report | Naylor 1'; Matheson 15'; Fletcher 48', 54'; Paterson 61' |

Pines Hockey Stadium, Adelaide
Umpires:
Tim Pullman (AUS)
Daniel Hasselhoff (AUS)

24 February 2007
18:00 (AWST)

| WA Thundersticks (Western Australia) | 2–1 | (Victoria (state)) VIC Vikings |
|---|---|---|
| Dyer 54' | Report | Smith 34'; Ford 38'; Ciriello 44' |

Perth Hockey Stadium, Perth
Umpires:
Cameron Scadding (AUS)
Daniel Johnston (AUS)

25 February 2007
15:00 (AEDT)

| Canberra Lakers (Australian Capital Territory) | 0–1 | (Queensland) QLD Blades |
|---|---|---|
| | Report | Elder 70' |

National Hockey Centre, Canberra
Umpires:
David Gentles (AUS)
Kieren Deland (AUS)

25 February 2007
15:00 (ACDT)

| Adelaide Hotshots (South Australia) | 1–3 | (New South Wales) NSW Waratahs |
|---|---|---|
| Rundle 9' | Report | Matheson 20', 30'; Charlton 61' |

Pines Hockey Stadium, Adelaide
Umpires:
Daniel Hasselhoff (AUS)
Tim Pullman (AUS)

25 February 2007
19:00 (ACST)

| Territory Stingers (Northern Territory) | 0–5 | (Tasmania) Tassie Tigers |
|---|---|---|
| | Report | Child 20'; Ockenden 42'; Richardson 46'; Tremayne 55'; Cock 58' |

Marrara Hockey Centre, Darwin
Umpires:
Stephen Rogers (AUS)
Paul Ludwig (AUS)

3 March 2007
15:00 (AEDT)

| Tassie Tigers (Tasmania) | 4–3 | (South Australia) Adelaide Hotshots |
|---|---|---|
| Guest 9'; Ancher 16'; Tremayne 31'; Richardson 62' | Report | McGregor 14', 37'; Jeffrey 48' |

Smithton Hockey Centre, Smithton
Umpires:
Stewart Dearing (AUS)
Colin Pearson (AUS)

3 March 2007
15:00 (AEST)

| QLD Blades (Queensland) | 4–2 | (Western Australia) WA Thundersticks |
|---|---|---|
| Bisley 39'; Eglington 52', 64', 68' | Report | Gibson 6'; George 19' |

State Hockey Centre, Brisbane
Umpires:
Paul Ludwig (AUS)
Ben de Young (AUS)

3 March 2007
16:00 (AEDT)

| Canberra Lakers (Australian Capital Territory) | 3–4 (a.e.t.) | (Northern Territory) Territory Stingers |
|---|---|---|
| Brown 16'; Davidson 27'; Onitiri 59' | Report | Abbott 2'; Collier 39'; Howson 56'; Barry 71' |

National Hockey Centre, Canberra
Umpires:
David Gentles (AUS)
Kieren Deland (AUS)

3 March 2007
18:00 (AEDT)

| VIC Vikings (Victoria (state)) | 3–4 | (New South Wales) NSW Waratahs |
|---|---|---|
| Doerner 34', 40'; Pollard 51' | Report | Matheson 13'; Naylor 16', 41', 60' |

State Netball and Hockey Centre, Melbourne
Umpires:
Adam Kearns (AUS)
Patrick McCann (AUS)

4 March 2007
12:00 (AEDT)

| Tassie Tigers (Tasmania) | 3–2 | (South Australia) Adelaide Hotshots |
|---|---|---|
| Richardson 31'; Cock 57', 68' | Report | Cleghorn 64'; Jeffrey 69' |

Smithton Hockey Centre, Smithton
Umpires:
Colin Pearson (AUS)
Stewart Dearing (AUS)

4 March 2007
15:00 (AEDT)

| VIC Vikings (Victoria (state)) | 3–2 | (New South Wales) NSW Waratahs |
|---|---|---|
| Pollard 48'; Doerner 64'; Higgins 65' | Report | Miller 22'; Govers 51' |

State Netball and Hockey Centre, Melbourne
Umpires:
Patrick McCann (AUS)
Adam Kearns (AUS)

4 March 2007
15:00 (AEDT)

| Canberra Lakers (Australian Capital Territory) | 4–6 | (Northern Territory) Territory Stingers |
|---|---|---|
| Davidson 20'; D. Hotchkis 26'; Onitiri 40'; Turner 63' | Report | T. Carroll 22'; Hewett 24', 70'; Abbott 31', 42'; A. Lockley 55' |

National Hockey Centre, Canberra
Umpires:
Kieren Deland (AUS)
Glen Munday (AUS)

4 March 2007
17:00 (AEST)

| QLD Blades (Queensland) | 3–2 (a.e.t.) | (Western Australia) WA Thundersticks |
|---|---|---|
| Butler 37'; Elder 61', 80' | Report | Trigwell 47', 65' |

State Hockey Centre, Brisbane
Umpires:
Ben de Young (AUS)
Paul Ludwig (AUS)

10 March 2007
16:00 (AEDT)

| NSW Waratahs (New South Wales) | 5–2 | (Tasmania) Tassie Tigers |
|---|---|---|
| Naylor 4'; Fletcher 40'; Livermore 45'; Govers 56'; Miller 57' | Report | Cock 15'; Richardson 37' |

Sydney Olympic Park, Sydney
Umpires:
Stewart Dearing (AUS)
David Gilbert (AUS)

10 March 2007
17:00 (AWST)

| WA Thundersticks (Western Australia) | 6–0 | (South Australia) Adelaide Hotshots |
|---|---|---|
| Brown 5', 27'; Charlesworth 48', 66'; Trigwell 52'; G. Boyce 62' | Report |

Perth Hockey Stadium, Perth
Umpires:
Cameron Scadding (AUS)
Daniel Johnston (AUS)

10 March 2007
18:00 (AEDT)

| VIC Vikings (Victoria (state)) | 4–3 (a.e.t.) | (Australian Capital Territory) Canberra Lakers |
|---|---|---|
| Smith 23'; Geraghty 59'; Doerner 67', 76' | Report | Jorgensen 48'; Davidson 55'; Turner 70' |

State Netball and Hockey Centre, Melbourne
Umpires:
Tim Pullman (AUS)
Patrick McCann (AUS)

10 March 2007
19:00 (ACST)

| Territory Stingers (Northern Territory) | 1–0 (a.e.t.) | (Queensland) QLD Blades |
|---|---|---|
| T. Carroll 76' | Report |

Marrara Hockey Centre, Darwin
Umpires:
Adam Kearns (AUS)
Ben de Young (AUS)

11 March 2007
13:00 (AEDT)

| NSW Waratahs (New South Wales) | 2–3 (a.e.t.) | (Tasmania) Tassie Tigers |
|---|---|---|
| Naylor 18'; Miller 20' | Report | Guest 35'; Ancher 51'; Richardson 73' |

Sydney Olympic Park, Sydney
Umpires:
David Gilbert (AUS)
Stewart Dearing (AUS)

11 March 2007
15:00 (AEDT)

| VIC Vikings (Victoria (state)) | 4–5 | (Australian Capital Territory) Canberra Lakers |
|---|---|---|
| Pollard 12'; Ford 26', 37', 39' | Report | Judge 18', 67'; Turner 40'; P. MacKinnon 51', 57' |

State Netball and Hockey Centre, Melbourne
Umpires:
Patrick McCann (AUS)
Tim Pullman (AUS)

11 March 2007
15:00 (AWST)

| WA Thundersticks (Western Australia) | 3–1 | (South Australia) Adelaide Hotshots |
|---|---|---|
| Dancer 11'; Charlesworth 52'; Hearn 52' | Report | Victory 37' |

Perth Hockey Stadium, Perth
Umpires:
Daniel Johnston (AUS)
Cameron Scadding (AUS)

11 March 2007
17:00 (ACST)

| Territory Stingers (Northern Territory) | 2–3 (a.e.t.) | (Queensland) QLD Blades |
|---|---|---|
| | Report |

Marrara Hockey Centre, Darwin
Umpires:
Ben de Young (AUS)
Adam Kearns (AUS)

17 March 2007
15:00 (ACDT)

| Adelaide Hotshots (South Australia) | 2–3 | (Northern Territory) Territory Stingers |
|---|---|---|
| Mills 22'; Jeffrey 57' | Report | Howsen 18'; T. Carroll 32'; Abbott 42' |

Alan Glassey Park, Berri
Umpires:
Tim Pullman (AUS)
Daniel Hasselhoff (AUS)

17 March 2007
16:00 (AEDT)

| NSW Waratahs (New South Wales) | 3–3 | (Australian Capital Territory) Canberra Lakers |
|---|---|---|
| Sutherland 2'; Naylor 30'; Matheson 47' | Report | P. MacKinnon 45'; D. Hotchkis 56'; Turner 58' |
Penalties
| | 3–2 |

Illawarra Hockey Stadium, Wollongong
Umpires:
Stewart Dearing (AUS)
Kieren Deland (AUS)

17 March 2007
17:00 (AEDT)

| Tassie Tigers (Tasmania) | 1–3 | (Western Australia) WA Thundersticks |
|---|---|---|
| Child 13' | Report | Gibson 11'; Davison 23'; G. Boyce 54' |

Northern Hockey Centre, Launceston
Umpires:
Paul Ludwig (AUS)
Colin Pearson (AUS)

17 March 2007
17:00 (AEST)

| QLD Blades (Queensland) | 1–2 | (Victoria (state)) VIC Vikings |
|---|---|---|
| Elder 68' | Report | Pollard 31'; Ciriello 39' |

State Hockey Centre, Brisbane
Umpires:
Adam Kearns (AUS)
Stephen Rogers (AUS)

18 March 2007
13:00 (AEDT)

| NSW Waratahs (New South Wales) | 2–2 | (Australian Capital Territory) Canberra Lakers |
|---|---|---|
| Fletcher 16'; Matheson 16' | Report | Brown 9'; Davidson 52' |
Penalties
| | 3–4 |

Illawarra Hockey Stadium, Wollongong
Umpires:
Kieren Deland (AUS)
Stewart Dearing (AUS)

18 March 2007
14:00 (ACDT)

| Adelaide Hotshots (South Australia) | 0–4 | (Northern Territory) Territory Stingers |
|---|---|---|
| | Report | T. Carroll 14'; Abbott 21'; Keirs 37'; Hewett 55' |

Port Adelaide Hockey Club, Port Adelaide
Umpires:
Daniel Hasselhoff (AUS)
Tim Pullman (AUS)

18 March 2007
15:00 (AEDT)

| Tassie Tigers (Tasmania) | 4–2 | (Western Australia) WA Thundersticks |
|---|---|---|
| Richardson 20', 42', 65'; Child 37' | Report | Gairns 7'; Jacobs 49' |

Northern Hockey Centre, Launceston
Umpires:
Colin Pearson (AUS)
Paul Ludwig (AUS)

18 March 2007
15:00 (AEST)

| QLD Blades (Queensland) | 4–3 (a.e.t.) | (Victoria (state)) VIC Vikings |
|---|---|---|
| Elder 49', 52'; De Young 59'; Burns 72' | Report | Ciriello 21'; Smith 44', 45' |

State Hockey Centre, Brisbane
Umpires:
Ben de Young (AUS)
Adam Kearns (AUS)

26 March 2007
11:00 (AWST)

| WA Thundersticks (Western Australia) | 4–1 | (Northern Territory) Territory Stingers |
|---|---|---|
| Hearn 4'; Charlesworth 11', 19'; Dyer 52' | Report | A. Lockley 70' |

Perth Hockey Stadium, Perth
Umpires:
David Gentles (AUS)
Colin Pearson (AUS)

26 March 2007
13:00 (AWST)

| VIC Vikings (Victoria (state)) | 3–2 | (Tasmania) Tassie Tigers |
|---|---|---|
| Pollard 11'; Geragthy 32'; Mirecki 69' | Report | Child 5'; Guest 24' |

Perth Hockey Stadium, Perth
Umpires:
Daniel Johnston (AUS)
Adam Kearns (AUS)

26 March 2007
15:00 (AWST)

| Canberra Lakers (Australian Capital Territory) | 4–2 | (South Australia) Adelaide Hotshots |
|---|---|---|
| D. Hotchkis 32'; Turner 38', 69'; McLennan 46' | Report | Jeffrey 18'; Cleghorn 21' |

Perth Hockey Stadium, Perth
Umpires:
Stephen Rogers (AUS)
Paul Ludwig (AUS)

26 March 2007
17:00 (AWST)

| QLD Blades (Queensland) | 4–0 | (New South Wales) NSW Waratahs |
|---|---|---|
| Elder 38'; Eglington 45', 47'; Dwyer 60' | Report |

Perth Hockey Stadium, Perth
Umpires:
Tim Pullman (AUS)
Cameron Scadding (AUS)

27 March 2007
13:00 (AWST)

| VIC Vikings (Victoria (state)) | 3–2 | (South Australia) Adelaide Hotshots |
|---|---|---|
| Ciriello 45', 47'; Mirecki 49' | Report | Schubert 3'; Jeffrey 10' |

Perth Hockey Stadium, Perth
Umpires:
Cameron Scadding (AUS)
Colin Pearson (AUS)

27 March 2007
15:00 (AWST)

| NSW Waratahs (New South Wales) | 10–1 | (Northern Territory) Territory Stingers |
|---|---|---|
| Paterson 17', 66'; McCann 21', 41'; Govers 25', 61'; Naylor 47', 47', 70'; Fletcher 63' | Report | Collier 38' |

Perth Hockey Stadium, Perth
Umpires:
Paul Ludwig (AUS)
Daniel Hasselhoff (AUS)

27 March 2007
17:00 (AWST)

| Tassie Tigers (Tasmania) | 2–7 | (Queensland) QLD Blades |
|---|---|---|
| Guest 69'; Wells 70' | Report | Elder 6'; Burns 12'; Dwyer 20'; Eglington 21', 34'; Swann 35'; Hammond 68' |

Perth Hockey Stadium, Perth
Umpires:
David Gentles (AUS)
Kieren Deland (AUS)

27 March 2007
19:00 (AWST)

| Canberra Lakers (Australian Capital Territory) | 1–0 | (Western Australia) WA Thundersticks |
|---|---|---|
| Brown 48' | Report |

Perth Hockey Stadium, Perth
Umpires:
Adam Kearns (AUS)
Tim Pullman (AUS)

29 March 2007
13:00 (AWST)

| Adelaide Hotshots (South Australia) | 1–3 | (Queensland) QLD Blades |
|---|---|---|
| Jeffrey 24' | Report | Eglington 22', 38'; Burns 63' |

Perth Hockey Stadium, Perth
Umpires:
Daniel Johnston (AUS)
David Gentles (AUS)

29 March 2007
15:00 (AWST)

| Tassie Tigers (Tasmania) | 3–1 | (Australian Capital Territory) Canberra Lakers |
|---|---|---|
| Tremayne 2'; Richardson 16', 30' | Report | Turner 54' |

Perth Hockey Stadium, Perth
Umpires:
Kieren Deland (AUS)
Stephen Rogers (AUS)

29 March 2007
17:00 (AWST)

| Territory Stingers (Northern Territory) | 0–2 | (Victoria (state)) VIC Vikings |
|---|---|---|
| | Report | Pollard 55'; Ciriello 57' |

Perth Hockey Stadium, Perth
Umpires:
Daniel Hasselhoff (AUS)
Adam Kearns (AUS)

29 March 2007
19:00 (AWST)

| NSW Waratahs (New South Wales) | 0–3 | (Western Australia) WA Thundersticks |
|---|---|---|
| | Report | Trigwell 16'; Burcher 20'; Hopkins 68' |

Perth Hockey Stadium, Perth
Umpires:
Tim Pullman (AUS)
Paul Ludwig (AUS)

=== Classification round ===
==== Fifth to eighth place classification ====
Crossover
31 March 2007
(New South Wales) NSW Waratahs | 2
(South Australia) Adelaide Hotshots | 4
31 March 2007
(Australian Capital Territory) Canberra Lakers | 2
(Northern Territory) Territory Stingers | 3

Fifth place
1 April 2007
(South Australia) Adelaide Hotshots | 5
(Northern Territory) Territory Stingers | 3
Seventh place
1 April 2007
(New South Wales) NSW Waratahs | 5
(Australian Capital Territory) Canberra Lakers | 0

===== Crossover =====
31 March 2007
08:30 (AWST)

| NSW Waratahs (New South Wales) | 2–4 | (South Australia) Adelaide Hotshots |
|---|---|---|
| Charlton 16'; Paterson 28' | Report | R. Fitzgerald 33'; Schubert 42', 55'; Jeffrey 66' |

Perth Hockey Stadium, Perth
Umpires:
Colin Pearson (AUS)
Daniel Johnston (AUS)

31 March 2007
10:30 (AWST)

| Canberra Lakers (Australian Capital Territory) | 2–3 | (Northern Territory) Territory Stingers |
|---|---|---|
| | Report |

Perth Hockey Stadium, Perth
Umpires:
Cameron Scadding (AUS)
Kieren Deland (AUS)

===== Seventh and eighth place =====
1 April 2007
08:30 (AWST)

| NSW Waratahs (New South Wales) | 5–0 | (Australian Capital Territory) Canberra Lakers |
|---|---|---|
| Naylor 7', 38'; McCann 17', 47'; Sutherland 26' | Report |

Perth Hockey Stadium, Perth
Umpires:
Colin Pearson (AUS)
Cameron Scadding (AUS)

===== Fifth and sixth place =====
1 April 2007
10:30 (AWST)

| Adelaide Hotshots (South Australia) | 5–3 | (Northern Territory) Territory Stingers |
|---|---|---|
| Mills 10'; Schubert 20'; B. Fitzgerald 22'; Cleghorn 44', 60' | Report | A. Lockley 27'; Hewett 36'; Collier 55' |

Perth Hockey Stadium, Perth
Umpires:
Paul Ludwig (AUS)
Daniel Johnston (AUS)

==== First to fourth place classification ====
Semi-finals
31 March 2007
(Queensland) QLD Blades | 6
(Tasmania) Tassie Tigers | 0
31 March 2007
(Victoria (state)) VIC Vikings | 0
(Western Australia) WA Thundersticks | 2

Final
1 April 2007
(Queensland) QLD Blades | 1
(Western Australia) WA Thundersticks | 0
Third place
1 April 2007
(Tasmania) Tassie Tigers | 4
(Victoria (state)) VIC Vikings (a.e.t) | 5

===== Semi-finals =====
31 March 2007
12:30 (AWST)

| QLD Blades (Queensland) | 6–0 | (Tasmania) Tassie Tigers |
|---|---|---|
| Wilson 9', 44'; Burns 17'; Elder 22', 53'; Dwyer 37' | Report |

Perth Hockey Stadium, Perth
Umpires:
Tim Pullman (AUS)
David Gentles (AUS)

31 March 2007
14:30 (AWST)

| VIC Vikings (Victoria (state)) | 0–2 | (Western Australia) WA Thundersticks |
|---|---|---|
| | Report | Brown 35'; Charlesworth 46' |

Perth Hockey Stadium, Perth
Umpires:
Paul Ludwig (AUS)
Adam Kearns (AUS)

===== Third and fourth place =====
1 April 2007
12:30 (AWST)

| Tassie Tigers (Tasmania) | 4–5 (a.e.t.) | (Victoria (state)) VIC Vikings |
|---|---|---|
| Guest 10', 11', 42'; Richardson 30' | Report | J. Brooks 5'; Mirecki 8'; Ciriello 13', 64', 74' |

Perth Hockey Stadium, Perth
Umpires:
Kieren Deland (AUS)
Stephen Rogers (AUS)

===== Final =====
1 April 2007
14:30 (AWST)

| QLD Blades (Queensland) | 1–0 | (Western Australia) WA Thundersticks |
|---|---|---|
| Elder 69' | Report |

Perth Hockey Stadium, Perth
Umpires:
David Gentles (AUS)
Tim Pullman (AUS)

== Awards ==
| Player of the Tournament | Top Goalscorer | Player of the Final |
|---|---|---|
| (Western Australia) Bevan George | (Tasmania) Marcus Richardson | (Queensland) Mark Knowles |

== Statistics ==
=== Final standings ===
| Pos | Team | Pld | W | WD | LD | L | GF | GA | GD | Pts | Qualification |
|---|---|---|---|---|---|---|---|---|---|---|---|
| 1st place, gold medalist(s) | (Queensland) QLD Blades | 13 | 8 | 3 | 1 | 1 | 44 | 16 | +28 | 40 | Gold Medal |
| 2nd place, silver medalist(s) | (Western Australia) WA Thundersticks | 13 | 7 | 0 | 1 | 5 | 30 | 20 | +10 | 28 | Silver Medal |
| 3rd place, bronze medalist(s) | (Victoria (state)) VIC Vikings | 13 | 6 | 2 | 1 | 4 | 36 | 32 | +4 | 32 | Bronze Medal |
| 4 | (Tasmania) Tassie Tigers | 13 | 6 | 1 | 1 | 5 | 36 | 40 | −4 | 24 | |
| 5 | (South Australia) Adelaide Hotshots | 13 | 2 | 0 | 0 | 11 | 26 | 46 | −20 | 6 | |
| 6 | (Northern Territory) Territory Stingers | 13 | 5 | 1 | 1 | 6 | 29 | 43 | −14 | 18 | |
| 7 | (New South Wales) NSW Waratahs | 13 | 6 | 1 | 2 | 4 | 43 | 32 | +11 | 25 | |
| 8 | (Australian Capital Territory) Canberra Lakers | 13 | 3 | 1 | 2 | 7 | 29 | 44 | −15 | 19 | |

Source: Clearing House
