= 2006 Men's Australian Hockey League =

2006 hockey league

Tournament details
- Host country: Australia
- Dates: 7 April – 21 May
- Teams: 8
- Venue(s): 8 (in 8 host cities)

Final positions
- Champions: (Queensland) QLD Blades (4th title)
- Runner-up: (Tasmania) Tassie Tigers
- Third place: (Victoria (state)) Azuma Vikings

Tournament statistics
- Matches played: 52
- Goals scored: 266 (5.12 per match)
- Top scorer(s): (Victoria (state)) Chris Ciriello (15 goals)
- Best player: (Queensland) Mark Knowles

The 2006 Men's Australian Hockey League was the 16th edition of the men's field hockey tournament. The tournament was held from 17 April through to 21 May 2006 at various venues, before culminating in Hobart for the finals.

QLD Blades won the tournament for the fourth time after defeating the Tassie Tigers 1–0 in the final. Azuma Vikings finished in third place after defeating WA Thundersticks 5–4 in penalties after a 5–5 draw in the third and fourth place playoff.

== Participating teams ==
- (Australian Capital Territory) Canberra Lakers
- (New South Wales) NSW Waratahs
- (Northern Territory) Territory Stingers
- (Queensland) QLD Blades
- (South Australia) Adelaide Hotshots
- (Tasmania) Tassie Tigers
- (Victoria (state)) Azuma Vikings
- (Western Australia) WA Thundersticks

== Competition format ==
The 2006 Men's Australian Hockey League consisted of a single round robin format, followed by classification matches.

Teams from all 8 states and territories competed against one another throughout the pool stage. At the conclusion of the pool stage, the top four ranked teams progressed to the semi-finals, while the bottom four teams continued to the classification stage.

The first four rounds of the pool stage comprised two-legged fixtures between states. As a result, matches in rounds five to seven of the pool stage were worth double points, due to the single-leg format.

=== Point allocation ===
Points
W	WD	LD	L
3	2	1	0

Every match in the 2006 AHL needed an outright result. In the event of a draw, golden goal extra time was played out, and if the result was still a draw a penalty shoot-out was contested, with the winner receiving a bonus point.

== Results ==
=== Preliminary round ===
Pos	Team	Pld	W	WD	LD	L	GF	GA	GD	Pts	Qualification
1	(Queensland) QLD Blades	11	8	2	0	1	33	17	+16	33	Semi-finals
2	(Victoria (state)) Azuma Vikings	11	7	2	1	1	41	27	+14	33	Semi-finals
3	(Tasmania) Tassie Tigers	11	6	0	0	5	29	28	+1	24	Semi-finals
4	(Western Australia) WA Thundersticks	11	4	0	2	5	22	21	+1	20	Semi-finals
5	(South Australia) Adelaide Hotshots	11	4	0	1	6	26	33	−7	19	
6	(New South Wales) NSW Waratahs	11	5	0	0	6	31	27	+4	18	
7	(Australian Capital Territory) Canberra Lakers	11	3	1	1	6	25	28	−3	15	
8	(Northern Territory) Territory Stingers	11	2	0	0	9	16	42	−26	6	

Source: Clearing House
Rules for classification: 1) points; 2) goal difference; 3) matches won; 4) goals scored; 5) head-to-head result.

==== Fixtures ====
7 April 2006
20:00 (AWST)

WA Thundersticks (Western Australia)	1–2	(New South Wales) NSW Waratahs
Bishop 40'	Report	Miller 6'; Fletcher 23'

Perth Hockey Stadium, Perth
Umpires:
Grant Mappin (AUS)
Daniel Johnston (AUS)

8 April 2006
14:00 (AEST)

QLD Blades (Queensland)	3–0	(South Australia) Adelaide Hotshots
Brown 44'; Wilson 46'; Harris 49'	Report

Queensland Hockey Centre, Brisbane
Umpires:
Stephen Rogers (AUS)
Adam Kearns (AUS)

8 April 2006
15:30 (AEST)

Canberra Lakers (Australian Capital Territory)	2–4	(Tasmania) Tassie Tigers
Davidson 37', 50'	Report	Guest 9'; Marshall 20', 56'; Corney 42'

National Hockey Centre, Canberra
Umpires:
David Gentles (AUS)
Stewart Dearing (AUS)

8 April 2006
16:00 (AEST)

Azuma Vikings (Victoria (state))	7–0	(Northern Territory) Territory Stingers
Ciriello 11'; Kleinschmidt 14', 18'; Mirecki 21'; Smith 45', 59'; Ford 56'	Report

State Netball and Hockey Centre, Melbourne
Umpires:
Anthony Traill (AUS)
Patrick McCann (AUS)

8 April 2006
18:00 (AWST)

WA Thundersticks (Western Australia)	1–2	(New South Wales) NSW Waratahs
Smith 53'	Report	Hardman 36'; Naylor 46'

Perth Hockey Stadium, Perth
Umpires:
Robert Golding (AUS)
Daniel Johnston (AUS)

9 April 2006
12:00 (AEST)

QLD Blades (Queensland)	4–1	(South Australia) Adelaide Hotshots
Burns 7'; Harris 38'; Wilson 40'; Barry 64'	Report	Cleghorn 43'

Queensland Hockey Centre, Brisbane
Umpires:
Paul Ludwig (AUS)
Adam Kearns (AUS)

9 April 2006
13:30 (AEST)

Canberra Lakers (Australian Capital Territory)	3–1	(Tasmania) Tassie Tigers
Brown 56', 66'; P. MacKinnon 59'	Report	Close 12'

National Hockey Centre, Canberra
Umpires:
David Gentles (AUS)
Stewart Dearing (AUS)

9 April 2006
15:00 (AEST)

Azuma Vikings (Victoria (state))	2–1	(Northern Territory) Territory Stingers
Pollard 41'; Geraghty 54'	Report	A. Lockley 38'

State Netball and Hockey Centre, Melbourne
Umpires:
Anthony Traill (AUS)
Patrick McCann (AUS)

15 April 2006
14:00 (AEST)

NSW Waratahs (New South Wales)	3–4	(Queensland) QLD Blades
Naylor 39'; Fletcher 58'; Matheson 60'	Report	Wilson 6'; Harris 24'; Eglington 48', 55'

Grafton Hockey Fields, Grafton
Umpires:
Stewart Dearing (AUS)
Kieren Deland (AUS)

15 April 2006
15:00 (ACST)

Adelaide Hotshots (South Australia)	3–0	(Australian Capital Territory) Canberra Lakers
Jeffrey 13'; McGregor 60'; Gibson 70'	Report

Pines Hockey Stadium, Adelaide
Umpires:
Tim Pullman (AUS)
Daniel Haselhoff (AUS)

15 April 2006
19:00 (AEST)

Tassie Tigers (Tasmania)	3–4	(Victoria (state)) Azuma Vikings
McAleese 12'; Guest 34', 43'	Report	Ciriello 16', 21', 51'; Smith 67'

Tasmanian Hockey Centre, Hobart
Umpires:
Anthony Traill (AUS)
Colin Pearson (AUS)

15 April 2006
19:00 (ACST)

Territory Stingers (Northern Territory)	3–1	(Western Australia) WA Thundersticks
A. Lockley 21'; J. Carroll 27'; Abbott 44'	Report	Galvin 59'

Marrara Hockey Centre, Darwin
Umpires:
Ian Lockley (AUS)
Paul Ludwig (AUS)

16 April 2006
12:00 (AEST)

NSW Waratahs (New South Wales)	1–2	(Queensland) QLD Blades
Booth 68'	Report	Wilson 19'; Hammond 46'

Grafton Hockey Fields, Grafton
Umpires:
Stewart Dearing (AUS)
Kieren Deland (AUS)

16 April 2006
15:00 (AEST)

Tassie Tigers (Tasmania)	5–4	(Victoria (state)) Azuma Vikings
Guest 13', 58'; Richardson 22'; Park 41'; Ancher 70'	Report	Ford 6'; Smith 10'; Ciriello 26', 44'

Tasmanian Hockey Centre, Hobart
Umpires:
Anthony Traill (AUS)
Colin Pearson (AUS)

16 April 2006
15:00 (ACST)

Adelaide Hotshots (South Australia)	2–6	(Australian Capital Territory) Canberra Lakers
Rundle 64'; McGregor 68'	Report	Turner 18'; Hawes 22'; Gilson 24'; P. MacKinnon 41'; Stebbings 54'; Davidson 59'

Pines Hockey Stadium, Adelaide
Umpires:
Tim Pullman (AUS)
Daniel Haselhoff (AUS)

16 April 2006
19:00 (ACST)

Territory Stingers (Northern Territory)	0–3	(Western Australia) WA Thundersticks
	Report	M. Boyce 34'; Dyer 38'; Bishop 50'

Marrara Hockey Centre, Darwin
Umpires:
Ian Lockley (AUS)
Paul Ludwig (AUS)

21 April 2006
20:00 (AEST)

QLD Blades (Queensland)	2–1	(Tasmania) Tassie Tigers
Barry 16'; Burns 56'	Report	Marshall 14'

Queensland Hockey Centre, Brisbane
Umpires:
Paul Ludwig (AUS)
Ben de Young (AUS)

22 April 2006
13:00 (ACST)

Adelaide Hotshots (South Australia)	2–3	(Victoria (state)) Azuma Vikings
Jeffrey 21', 29'	Report	J. Brooks 4'; Smith 12'; Ciriello 54'

Pines Hockey Stadium, Adelaide
Umpires:
Tim Pullman (AUS)
Levi Stephen (AUS)

22 April 2006
18:00 (AEST)

QLD Blades (Queensland)	2–0	(Tasmania) Tassie Tigers
Butler 13'; Harris 51'	Report

Queensland Hockey Centre, Brisbane
Umpires:
Paul Ludwig (AUS)
Stephen Rogers (AUS)

22 April 2006
19:00 (ACST)

Territory Stingers (Northern Territory)	4–2	(New South Wales) NSW Waratahs
Abbott 21', 56'; Spry 34'; A. Lockley 62'	Report	McCann 49', 58'

Marrara Hockey Centre, Darwin
Umpires:
Ian Lockley (AUS)
Colin Pearson (AUS)

22 April 2006
19:00 (AWST)

WA Thundersticks (Western Australia)	2–2	(Australian Capital Territory) Canberra Lakers
Kavanagh 13'; Dyer 66'	Report	Davidson 14'; Brown 24'
Penalties
	5–6

Perth Hockey Stadium, Perth
Umpires:
Grant Mappin (AUS)
Robert Golding (AUS)

23 April 2006
15:00 (ACST)

Adelaide Hotshots (South Australia)	5–5	(Victoria (state)) Azuma Vikings
Jeffrey 4'; Fitzgerald 21'; McGregor 36', 61'; Cleghorn 58'	Report	Ciriello 3', 51', 54'; T. Brooks 15'; J. Brooks 49'
Penalties
	4–5

Pines Hockey Stadium, Adelaide
Umpires:
Tim Pullman (AUS)
Levi Stephen (AUS)

23 April 2006
17:00 (AWST)

WA Thundersticks (Western Australia)	4–1	(Australian Capital Territory) Canberra Lakers
Dyer 10'; Bishop 23'; Burcher 37'; Smith 45'	Report	L. MacKinnon 43'

Perth Hockey Stadium, Perth
Umpires:
Grant Mappin (AUS)
Daniel Johnston (AUS)

23 April 2006
19:00 (ACST)

Territory Stingers (Northern Territory)	2–6	(New South Wales) NSW Waratahs
T. Carroll 14', 19'	Report	Booth 21'; Naylor 35'; Fletcher 42'; Hardman 60'; Miller 64'; Beaton 66'

Marrara Hockey Centre, Darwin
Umpires:
Ian Lockley (AUS)
Colin Pearson (AUS)

28 April 2006
20:00 (AEST)

Tassie Tigers (Tasmania)	4–3	(Northern Territory) Territory Stingers
Shaw 20'; McAleese 23'; Wells 62'; Guest 66'	Report	T. Carroll 24', 39'; Narkle 70'

Tasmanian Hockey Centre, Hobart
Umpires:
Tim Pullman (AUS)
Colin Pearson (AUS)

29 April 2006
14:00 (AEST)

NSW Waratahs (New South Wales)	1–2	(South Australia) Adelaide Hotshots
McCann 25'	Report	Jeffrey 48'; Cleghorn 65'

Sydney Olympic Park, Sydney
Umpires:
Stewart Dearing (AUS)
Kieren Deland (AUS)

29 April 2006
15:30 (AEST)

Canberra Lakers (Australian Capital Territory)	2–3 (a.e.t.)	(Queensland) QLD Blades
M. Hotchkis 4'; Davidson 13'	Report	Wilson 31'; Hammond 40'; Brown 82'

National Hockey Centre, Canberra
Umpires:
David Gentles (AUS)
Adam Kearns (AUS)

29 April 2006
19:00 (AEST)

Tassie Tigers (Tasmania)	3–2	(Northern Territory) Territory Stingers
Shaw 12'; Ockenden 39'; Corney 43'	Report	Henwood 21'; Abbott 31'

Tasmanian Hockey Centre, Hobart
Umpires:
Tim Pullman (AUS)
Colin Pearson (AUS)

29 April 2006
19:00 (AEST)

Azuma Vikings (Victoria (state))	3–1	(Western Australia) WA Thundersticks
Geraghty 11'; Smith 45'; Monte 49'	Report	Dyer 37'

State Netball and Hockey Centre, Melbourne
Umpires:
Anthony Traill (AUS)
Patrick McCann (AUS)

30 April 2006
13:30 (AEST)

Canberra Lakers (Australian Capital Territory)	2–3	(Queensland) QLD Blades
L. MacKinnon 9', 48'	Report	Butler 31'; Hammond 35'; Wilson 36'

National Hockey Centre, Canberra
Umpires:
David Gentles (AUS)
Adam Kearns (AUS)

30 April 2006
14:00 (AEST)

NSW Waratahs (New South Wales)	7–3	(South Australia) Adelaide Hotshots
McCann 4', 6', 55'; Fletcher 12', 17'; Miller 14'; Naylor 40'	Report	Stephen 27'; McGregor 29'; Fitzgerald 66'

Sydney Olympic Park, Sydney
Umpires:
Kieren Deland (AUS)
Stewart Dearing (AUS)

30 April 2006
16:00 (AEST)

Azuma Vikings (Victoria (state))	4–3 (a.e.t.)	(Western Australia) WA Thundersticks
Ciriello 46', 50', 60'; Simpson 73'	Report	Hopkins 16'; Dyer 55'; Bishop 68'

State Netball and Hockey Centre, Melbourne
Umpires:
Anthony Traill (AUS)
Patrick McCann (AUS)

15 May 2006
13:00 (AEST)

Tassie Tigers (Tasmania)	1–2	(Western Australia) WA Thundersticks
Tremayne 41'	Report	Galvin 47'; G. Boyce 64'

Tasmanian Hockey Centre, Hobart
Umpires:
Stewart Dearing (AUS)
Adam Kearns (AUS)

15 May 2006
15:00 (AEST)

NSW Waratahs (New South Wales)	3–1	(Australian Capital Territory) Canberra Lakers
McCann 21'; Matheson 25'; Hardman 47'	Report	Hawes 28'

Tasmanian Hockey Centre, Hobart
Umpires:
Tim Pullman (AUS)
Paul Ludwig (AUS)

15 May 2006
17:00 (AEST)

Territory Stingers (Northern Territory)	0–5	(South Australia) Adelaide Hotshots
	Report	Schubert 4', 6'; McGregor 16'; Reece 22', 24'

Tasmanian Hockey Centre, Hobart
Umpires:
Patrick McCann (AUS)
Daniel Johnston (AUS)

15 May 2006
19:00 (AEST)

Azuma Vikings (Victoria (state))	3–4 (a.e.t.)	(Queensland) QLD Blades
Ciriello 17'; Simpson 54', 58'	Report	Eglington 24'; Hammond 27', 54'; Elder 76'

Tasmanian Hockey Centre, Hobart
Umpires:
David Gentles (AUS)
Kieren Deland (AUS)

16 May 2006
13:00 (AEST)

Canberra Lakers (Australian Capital Territory)	4–0	(Northern Territory) Territory Stingers
Davidson 6'; D. Hotchkis 15'; Turner 23'; Judge 55'	Report

Tasmanian Hockey Centre, Hobart
Umpires:
Daniel Haselhoff (AUS)
Adam Kearns (AUS)

16 May 2006
15:00 (AEST)

Azuma Vikings (Victoria (state))	3–1	(New South Wales) NSW Waratahs
Ciriello 17'; Ford 42'; J. Brooks 66'	Report	Naylor 53'

Tasmanian Hockey Centre, Hobart
Umpires:
Robert Golding (AUS)
Paul Ludwig (AUS)

16 May 2006
17:00 (AEST)

QLD Blades (Queensland)	1–3	(Western Australia) WA Thundersticks
Harris 49'	Report	Galvin 7'; Gairns 28'; Bishop 50'

Tasmanian Hockey Centre, Hobart
Umpires:
Stewart Dearing (AUS)
David Gentles (AUS)

16 May 2006
19:00 (AEST)

Adelaide Hotshots (South Australia)	1–3	(Tasmania) Tassie Tigers
Jeffrey 13'	Report	Shaw 23'; Corney 54'; Guest 59'

Tasmanian Hockey Centre, Hobart
Umpires:
Kieren Deland (AUS)
Patrick McCann (AUS)

18 May 2006
13:00 (AEST)

QLD Blades (Queensland)	5–1	(Northern Territory) Territory Stingers
Elder 4', 31'; Hammond 21'; Dwyer 21'; Harris 65'	Report	J. Lockley 69'

Tasmanian Hockey Centre, Hobart
Umpires:
Patrick McCann (AUS)
Tim Pullman (AUS)

18 May 2006
15:00 (AEST)

WA Thundersticks (Western Australia)	1–2	(South Australia) Adelaide Hotshots
M. Boyce 22'	Report	Jeffrey 10', 50'

Tasmanian Hockey Centre, Hobart
Umpires:
Stewart Dearing (AUS)
David Gentles (AUS)

18 May 2006
17:00 (AEST)

Canberra Lakers (Australian Capital Territory)	2–3	(Victoria (state)) Azuma Vikings
Turner 63'; L. MacKinnon 65'	Report	Doerner 11', 44'; Smyth 68'

Tasmanian Hockey Centre, Hobart
Umpires:
Robert Golding (AUS)
Adam Kearns (AUS)

18 May 2006
19:00 (AEST)

NSW Waratahs (New South Wales)	3–4	(Tasmania) Tassie Tigers
Matheson 23', 62'; Miller 34'	Report	Guest 4'; McAleese 44', 69'; Richardson 46'

Tasmanian Hockey Centre, Hobart
Umpires:
Paul Ludwig (AUS)
Daniel Haselhoff (AUS)

=== Classification round ===
==== Fifth to eighth place classification ====
Crossover
20 May 2006
(South Australia) Adelaide Hotshots	3
(Northern Territory) Territory Stingers	2
20 May 2006
(New South Wales) NSW Waratahs (p.s.o)	3 (4)
(Australian Capital Territory) Canberra Lakers	3 (2)

Fifth place
21 May 2006
(South Australia) Adelaide Hotshots	4
(New South Wales) NSW Waratahs	3
Seventh place
21 May 2006
(Northern Territory) Territory Stingers	2
(Australian Capital Territory) Canberra Lakers	4

===== Crossover =====
20 May 2006
08:30 (AEST)

Adelaide Hotshots (South Australia)	3–2	(Northern Territory) Territory Stingers
Schubert 12'; Cleghorn 23'; Wishart 45'	Report	Collier 33'; J. Lockley 47'

Tasmanian Hockey Centre, Hobart
Umpires:
Patrick McCann (AUS)
Robert Golding (AUS)

20 May 2006
10:30 (AEST)

NSW Waratahs (New South Wales)	3–3	(Australian Capital Territory) Canberra Lakers
Naylor 7'; Beaton 13'; Fletcher 57'	Report	D. Hotchkis 7', 29'; Turner 53'
Penalties
	4–2

Tasmanian Hockey Centre, Hobart
Umpires:
Daniel Haselhoff (AUS)
Daniel Johnston (AUS)

===== Seventh and eighth place =====
20 May 2006
08:30 (AEST)

Territory Stingers (Northern Territory)	2–4	(Australian Capital Territory) Canberra Lakers
A. Lockley 10'; Finlay 55'	Report	P. MacKinnon 14'; Stebbings 28'; L. MacKinnon 45'; Brown 69'

Tasmanian Hockey Centre, Hobart
Umpires:
Daniel Haselhoff (AUS)
Patrick McCann (AUS)

===== Fifth and sixth place =====
21 May 2006
10:30 (AEST)

Adelaide Hotshots (South Australia)	4–3	(New South Wales) NSW Waratahs
Victory 41'; Reece 45'; Schubert 52'; Wishart 66'	Report	Naylor 26'; Booth 32'; Hardman 61'

Tasmanian Hockey Centre, Hobart
Umpires:
Robert Golding (AUS)
Daniel Johnston (AUS)

==== First to fourth place classification ====
Semi-finals
20 May 2006
(Queensland) QLD Blades	5
(Western Australia) WA Thundersticks	0
20 May 2006
(Victoria (state)) Azuma Vikings	1
(Tasmania) Tassie Tigers	2

Final
21 May 2006
(Queensland) QLD Blades	1
(Tasmania) Tassie Tigers	0
Third place
21 May 2006
(Western Australia) WA Thundersticks	5 (4)
(Victoria (state)) Azuma Vikings (p.s.o)	5 (5)

===== Semi-finals =====
20 May 2006
12:30 (AEST)

QLD Blades (Queensland)	5–0	(Western Australia) WA Thundersticks
Clutton 2'; Eglington 11'; Dwyer 49'; Elder 57'; Wilson 66'	Report

Tasmanian Hockey Centre, Hobart
Umpires:
Tim Pullman (AUS)
David Gentles (AUS)

20 May 2006
14:30 (AEST)

Azuma Vikings (Victoria (state))	1–2	(Tasmania) Tassie Tigers
J. Brooks 44'	Report	Tremayne 9'; Richardson 52'

Tasmanian Hockey Centre, Hobart
Umpires:
Stewart Dearing (AUS)
Kieren Deland (AUS)

===== Third and fourth place =====
21 May 2006
12:30 (AEST)

WA Thundersticks (Western Australia)	5–5	(Victoria (state)) Azuma Vikings
Gairns 28'; Bishop 41'; Dyer 47', 58', 68'	Report	T. Brooks 6', 25', 38'; Doerner 40'; J. Brooks 50'
Penalties
	4–5

Tasmanian Hockey Centre, Hobart
Umpires:
Kieren Deland (AUS)
Tim Pullman (AUS)

===== Final =====
21 May 2006
14:30 (AEST)

QLD Blades (Queensland)	1–0	(Tasmania) Tassie Tigers
De Young 23'	Report

Tasmanian Hockey Centre, Hobart
Umpires:
David Gentles (AUS)
Stewart Dearing (AUS)

== Awards ==
Player of the Tournament	Top Goalscorer	Player of the Final
(Queensland) Mark Knowles	(Victoria (state)) Chris Ciriello	(Queensland) Dean Butler

== Statistics ==
=== Final standings ===
Pos	Team	Pld	W	WD	LD	L	GF	GA	GD	Pts	Qualification
1st place, gold medalist(s)	(Queensland) QLD Blades	13	12	0	0	1	39	17	+22	42	Gold Medal
2nd place, silver medalist(s)	(Tasmania) Tassie Tigers	13	7	0	0	6	31	30	+1	27	Silver Medal
3rd place, bronze medalist(s)	(Victoria (state)) Azuma Vikings	13	8	2	0	3	47	34	+13	34	Bronze Medal
4	(Western Australia) WA Thundersticks	13	4	0	2	7	27	31	−4	20	
5	(South Australia) Adelaide Hotshots	13	6	0	1	6	33	38	−5	25	
6	(New South Wales) NSW Waratahs	13	5	1	0	7	37	34	+3	20	
7	(Australian Capital Territory) Canberra Lakers	13	4	1	1	7	32	33	−1	18	
8	(Northern Territory) Territory Stingers	13	2	0	0	11	20	49	−29	6	

Source: Clearing House

=== Goalscorers ===
There were 266 goals scored in 52 matches, for an average of 5.12 goals per match.

15 goals

- (Victoria (state)) Christopher Ciriello

8 goals

- (South Australia) Adam Jeffrey
- (Tasmania) David Guest
- (Western Australia) Judd Dyer

7 goals

- (New South Wales) Michael McCann
- (New South Wales) Matthew Naylor
- (Queensland) Jason Wilson

6 goals

- (Australian Capital Territory) Iain Davidson
- (New South Wales) Stuart Fletcher
- (Queensland) Robert Hammond
- (Queensland) Mark Harris
- (South Australia) Matthew McGregor
- (Victoria (state)) Andrew Smith
- (Western Australia) Benjamin Bishop

5 goals

- (Australian Capital Territory) Luke MacKinnon
- (Victoria (state)) Jason Brooks

4 goals

- (Australian Capital Territory) Blair Brown
- (Australian Capital Territory) Glenn Turner
- (New South Wales) Alexander Hardman
- (New South Wales) Elias Matheson
- (New South Wales) Joshua Miller
- (Northern Territory) Desmond Abbott
- (Northern Territory) Travis Carroll
- (Northern Territory) Adrian Lockley
- (Queensland) Nathan Eglington
- (Queensland) Troy Elder
- (South Australia) Thomas Cleghorn
- (South Australia) Grant Schubert
- (Tasmania) Shea McAleese
- (Victoria (state)) Travis Brooks

3 goals

- (Australian Capital Territory) Daniel Hotchkis
- (Australian Capital Territory) Paul MacKinnon
- (New South Wales) Brendan Booth
- (South Australia) Gregory Reece
- (Tasmania) Joshua Corney
- (Tasmania) Phillip Marshall
- (Tasmania) Marcus Richardson
- (Tasmania) Hayden Shaw
- (Victoria (state)) Luke Doerner
- (Victoria (state)) Russell Ford
- (Victoria (state)) Glenn Simpson
- (Western Australia) David Galvin

2 goals

- (Australian Capital Territory) Joshua Hawes
- (Australian Capital Territory) Jonathon Stebbings
- (New South Wales) Simon Beaton
- (Northern Territory) Jarrod Lockley
- (Queensland) Wayne Barry
- (Queensland) Kiel Brown
- (Queensland) Jacob Burns
- (Queensland) Dean Butler
- (Queensland) Jamie Dwyer
- (South Australia) Ross Fitzgerald
- (South Australia) Ian Wishart
- (Tasmania) Nicholas Tremayne
- (Victoria (state)) Declan Geragthy
- (Victoria (state)) Aaron Kleinschmidt
- (Western Australia) Michael Boyce
- (Western Australia) Brendan Gairns
- (Western Australia) Andrew Smith

1 goal

- (Australian Capital Territory) Evan Gilson
- (Australian Capital Territory) Matthew Hotchkis
- (Australian Capital Territory) Lucas Judge
- (Northern Territory) Joel Carroll
- (Northern Territory) Benjamin Collier
- (Northern Territory) Cameron Finlay
- (Northern Territory) Casey Henwood
- (Northern Territory) Brendan Narkle
- (Northern Territory) Adam Spry
- (Queensland) George Clutton
- (Queensland) Liam de Young
- (South Australia) Jonathan Gibson
- (South Australia) Charles Rundle
- (South Australia) Dale Stephen
- (South Australia) Craig Victory
- (Tasmania) Paul Ancher
- (Tasmania) Oliver Close
- (Tasmania) Edward Ockenden
- (Tasmania) Michael Park
- (Tasmania) Matthew Wells
- (Victoria (state)) Daniel Mirecki
- (Victoria (state)) Andrew Monte
- (Victoria (state)) Joshua Pollard
- (Victoria (state)) Ian Smyth
- (Western Australia) Geoffrey Boyce
- (Western Australia) Ian Burcher
- (Western Australia) Aaron Hopkins
- (Western Australia) Fergus Kavanagh
