= 2010 Men's Australian Hockey League =

Tournament details
- Host country: Australia
- Teams: 8
- Venue: 5 (in 5 host cities)

Final positions
- Champions: (Queensland) QLD Blades (6th title)
- Runner-up: (New South Wales) NSW Waratahs
- Third place: (Victoria (state)) VIC Vikings

Tournament statistics
- Matches played: 44
- Goals scored: 255 (5.8 per match)
- Top scorer: (New South Wales) Joshua Miller (14 goals)
- Best player: (New South Wales) Simon Orchard (Northern Territory) Desmond Abbott

The 2010 Men's Australian Hockey League was the 20th edition of the men's field hockey tournament. The finals week of the tournament was held in the Queensland city of Brisbane.

The WA Thundersticks won the gold medal for the ninth time by defeating the NSW Waratahs 4–3 in the final.

== Competition format ==
The format included five round-matches over two weekends and a finals week that consisted of two round-matches and three pool matches for a place in the final.

After all the round matches were complete the teams were ranked 1–8 depending on the total number of points earned in all their round matches.

The teams ranked 1, 4, 6 & 8 progressed to Pool A, while teams ranked 2, 3, 5 & 7 progressed to Pool B. All previously earned points were removed with the teams in each pool playing each other once more. At the completion of the pool matches, the top team from each pool advanced to the League Final.

== Teams ==
- (Australian Capital Territory) Canberra Lakers
- (South Australia) Southern Hotshots
- (New South Wales) NSW Waratahs
- (Tasmania) Tassie Tigers
- (Northern Territory) NT Stingers
- (Victoria (state)) VIC Vikings
- (Queensland) QLD Blades
- (Western Australia) WA Thundersticks

== Results ==
=== Preliminary round ===
Pos	Team	Pld	W	D	L	GF	GA	GD	Pts	Qualification
1	(Victoria (state)) VIC Vikings	7	6	0	1	26	17	+9	18	Pool A
2	(Queensland) QLD Blades	7	4	1	2	30	12	+18	13	Pool B
3	(Western Australia) WA Thundersticks	7	4	1	2	22	10	+12	13	Pool B
4	(New South Wales) NSW Waratahs	7	4	0	3	27	21	+6	12	Pool A
5	(Australian Capital Territory) Canberra Lakers	7	4	0	3	18	15	+3	12	Pool B
6	(Northern Territory) NT Stingers	7	2	0	5	12	23	−11	6	Pool B
7	(Tasmania) Tassie Tigers	7	2	0	5	18	34	−16	6	Pool A
8	(South Australia) Southern Hotshots	7	1	0	6	11	32	−21	3	Pool A

Source: Clearing House

==== Fixtures ====
18 June 2010

VIC Vikings (Victoria (state))	5–0	(Australian Capital Territory) Canberra Lakers
Webster 6'; Mirecki 25', 48'; MacKinnon 25'; Wischusen 70'	Report

Stadium:
Sydney Olympic Park, Sydney

18 June 2010

NT Stingers (Northern Territory)	1–4	(Western Australia) WA Thundersticks
Abbott 54'	Report	Kavanagh 6'; Jacobs 41'; Park 61'; Taylor 67'

Stadium:
State Hockey Centre, Adelaide

18 June 2010

NSW Waratahs (New South Wales)	6–3	(Tasmania) Tassie Tigers
Paterson 26', 47'; Matheson 31'; Orchard 32', 35', 54'	Report	Ockenden 3'; Cock 22'; Middleton 48'

Stadium:
Sydney Olympic Park, Sydney

18 June 2010

Southern Hotshots (South Australia)	3–2	(Queensland) QLD Blades
Hughes 21'; Wickham 31'; Schubert 38'	Report	De Young 19'; Knowles 70'

Stadium:
State Hockey Centre, Adelaide

19 June 2010

Tassie Tigers (Tasmania)	4–5	(Victoria (state)) VIC Vikings
Cock 25'; Ancher 46'; Simpson 58'; Tremayne 67'	Report	McLennan 10', 33'; Ford 15'; Wischusen 26', 29'

Stadium:
Sydney Olympic Park, Sydney

19 June 2010

NSW Waratahs (New South Wales)	4–2	(Australian Capital Territory) Canberra Lakers
Sutherland 8'; Miller 9', 56'; Orchard 13'	Report	D. Hotchkis 37'; Conroy 66'

Stadium:
Sydney Olympic Park, Sydney

19 June 2010

WA Thundersticks (Western Australia)	1–1	(Queensland) QLD Blades
Mitton 62'	Report	Whetton 18'

Stadium:
State Hockey Centre, Adelaide

19 June 2010

Southern Hotshots (South Australia)	0–2	(Northern Territory) NT Stingers
	Report	T. Carroll 3'; Ginolfi 36'

Stadium:
State Hockey Centre, Adelaide

20 June 2010

Canberra Lakers (Australian Capital Territory)	1–2	(Tasmania) Tassie Tigers
Turner 8'	Report	Cock 32', 46'

Stadium:
Sydney Olympic Park, Sydney

20 June 2010

QLD Blades (Queensland)	4–1	(Northern Territory) NT Stingers
Whetton 29'; Wilson 32', 53'; Gohdes 70'	Report	Gabriel 50'

Stadium:
State Hockey Centre, Adelaide

20 June 2010

VIC Vikings (Victoria (state))	4–2	(New South Wales) NSW Waratahs
McLennan 5', 19'; Ford 34'; MacKinnon 56'	Report	Matheson 28'; Miller 47'

Stadium:
Sydney Olympic Park, Sydney

20 June 2010

WA Thundersticks (Western Australia)	7–0	(South Australia) Southern Hotshots
Taylor 1'; Boyce 8'; Mitton 10', 12', 41'; Kavanagh 17'; Park 19'	Report

Stadium:
State Hockey Centre, Adelaide

3 July 2010

Tassie Tigers (Tasmania)	3–4	(Western Australia) WA Thundersticks
Deavin 32', 42'; Cock 44'	Report	Mitton 2', 27'; Hearn 8'; Reece 31'

Stadium:
State Netball and Hockey Centre, Melbourne

3 July 2010

QLD Blades (Queensland)	4–3	(New South Wales) NSW Waratahs
Wilson 26'; Hammond 34'; M. Bates 53'; Whetton 69'	Report	Butturini 46'; Paterson 58', 64'

Stadium:
National Hockey Centre, Canberra

3 July 2010

VIC Vikings (Victoria (state))	6–2	(South Australia) Southern Hotshots
Mirecki 17', 45'; McLennan 31'; Simpson 49'; Ford 57'; Webster 66'	Report	Schubert 26'; Wickham 70'

Stadium:
State Netball and Hockey Centre, Melbourne

3 July 2010

NT Stingers (Northern Territory)	0–3	(Australian Capital Territory) Canberra Lakers
	Report	Turner 11', 48'; Wallace 33'

Stadium:
National Hockey Centre, Canberra

4 July 2010

WA Thundersticks (Western Australia)	1–2	(Victoria (state)) VIC Vikings
Burcher 21'	Report	MacKinnon 9'; Ford 49'

Stadium:
State Netball and Hockey Centre, Melbourne

4 July 2010

NSW Waratahs (New South Wales)	6–1	(Northern Territory) NT Stingers
Govers 19'; Orchard 23', 55'; Miller 30', 44'; Lobsey 59'	Report	Lockley 54'

Stadium:
National Hockey Centre, Canberra

4 July 2010

Southern Hotshots (South Australia)	3–4	(Tasmania) Tassie Tigers
Claxton 17'; Wickham 46'; Cox 52'	Report	Ockenden 14'; Clifford 16'; Cock 49'; Deavin 63'

Stadium:
State Netball and Hockey Centre, Melbourne

4 July 2010

Canberra Lakers (Australian Capital Territory)	4–3	(Queensland) QLD Blades
Backhus 5'; Turner 32', 69'; Wallace 58'	Report	Wilson 41'; M. Bates 43'; Hammond 68'

Stadium:
National Hockey Centre, Canberra

21 August 2010

WA Thundersticks (Western Australia)	1–2	(Australian Capital Territory) Canberra Lakers
Mitton 10'	Report	Archibald 14'; Wallace 42'

Stadium:
Queensland State Hockey Centre, Brisbane

21 August 2010

Southern Hotshots (South Australia)	3–5	(New South Wales) NSW Waratahs
Wickham 27', 63'; Schubert 36'	Report	Orchard 11', 41'; Miller 21', 23'; Butturini 44'

Stadium:
Queensland State Hockey Centre, Brisbane

21 August 2010

NT Stingers (Northern Territory)	3–4	(Victoria (state)) VIC Vikings
Abbott 21', 36'; T. Carroll 66'	Report	MacKinnon 39'; Ford 47', 69'; Philpott 66'

Stadium:
Queensland State Hockey Centre, Brisbane

21 August 2010

Tassie Tigers (Tasmania)	0–11	(Queensland) QLD Blades
	Report	De Young 7', 23', 49'; Wilson 15', 47'; Whetton 29', 51'; Gohdes 35'; Dwyer 36', 45'; Burns 53'

Stadium:
Queensland State Hockey Centre, Brisbane

22 August 2010

Canberra Lakers (Australian Capital Territory)	6–0	(South Australia) Southern Hotshots
Wallace 4'; Backhus 35'; Hinde 40', 44', 49'; Turner 61'	Report

Stadium:
Queensland State Hockey Centre, Brisbane

22 August 2010

NT Stingers (Northern Territory)	4–2	(Tasmania) Tassie Tigers
T. Carroll 53'; Abbott 57', 63'; Poulton 66'	Report	Ockenden 31', 45'

Stadium:
Queensland State Hockey Centre, Brisbane

22 August 2010

QLD Blades (Queensland)	5–0	(Victoria (state)) VIC Vikings
Wilson 23'; Whetton 27'; Gohdes 50'; T. Bates 58'; Burns 66'	Report

Stadium:
Queensland State Hockey Centre, Brisbane

22 August 2010

NSW Waratahs (New South Wales)	1–4	(Western Australia) WA Thundersticks
Sutherland 63'	Report	Taylor 8', 57'; Burcher 40'; Boyne 65'

Stadium:
Queensland State Hockey Centre, Brisbane

=== Classification round ===
==== Pool matches ====
===== Pool A =====
Pos	Team	Pld	W	D	L	GF	GA	GD	Pts
1	(New South Wales) NSW Waratahs	3	3	0	0	18	4	+14	9
2	(Victoria (state)) VIC Vikings	3	1	1	1	8	11	−3	4
3	(Tasmania) Tassie Tigers	3	1	0	2	5	9	−4	3
4	(South Australia) Southern Hotshots	3	0	1	2	5	12	−7	1

Source: Clearing House

24 August 2010

VIC Vikings (Victoria (state))	3–3	(South Australia) Southern Hotshots
Simpson 19'; Ford 32'; Mirecki 70'	Report	Stacy 33'; Bowden 36'; Claxton 52'

Stadium:
Queensland State Hockey Centre, Brisbane

24 August 2010

NSW Waratahs (New South Wales)	5–1	(Tasmania) Tassie Tigers
Miller 3', 21', 32'; Paterson 7'; Govers 11'	Report	Deavin 17'

Stadium:
Queensland State Hockey Centre, Brisbane

25 August 2010

VIC Vikings (Victoria (state))	3–1	(Tasmania) Tassie Tigers
Webster 15'; Ford 45'; Pollard 50'	Report	Shaw 32'

Stadium:
Queensland State Hockey Centre, Brisbane

25 August 2010

NSW Waratahs (New South Wales)	6–1	(South Australia) Southern Hotshots
Todd 7'; Paterson 25'; Matheson 27'; Miller 38'; Orchard 43'; Sutherland 46'	Report	Wickham 50'

Stadium:
Queensland State Hockey Centre, Brisbane

27 August 2010

VIC Vikings (Victoria (state))	2–7	(New South Wales) NSW Waratahs
McLennan 2'; Ford 48'	Report	Miller 20'; Paterson 23', 37'; Lobsey 30'; Sutherland 44', 62'; Govers 64'

Stadium:
Queensland State Hockey Centre, Brisbane

27 August 2010

Tassie Tigers (Tasmania)	3–1	(South Australia) Southern Hotshots
Marshall 7'; Lucas 14'; Ockenden 64'	Report	Schubert 27'

Stadium:
Queensland State Hockey Centre, Brisbane

===== Pool B =====
Pos	Team	Pld	W	D	L	GF	GA	GD	Pts
1	(Queensland) QLD Blades	3	2	1	0	13	4	+9	7
2	(Western Australia) WA Thundersticks	3	2	0	1	8	8	0	6
3	(Australian Capital Territory) Canberra Lakers	3	0	2	1	6	8	−2	2
4	(Northern Territory) NT Stingers	3	0	1	2	4	11	−7	1

Source: Clearing House

24 August 2010

QLD Blades (Queensland)	4–1	(Northern Territory) NT Stingers
Whetton 15', 52'; Elder 17'; Dwyer 22'	Report	Abbott 24'

Stadium:
Queensland State Hockey Centre, Brisbane

24 August 2010

WA Thundersticks (Western Australia)	3–1	(Australian Capital Territory) Canberra Lakers
Mitton 7'; Dancer 51'; Taylor 56'	Report	Turner 10'

Stadium:
Queensland State Hockey Centre, Brisbane

25 August 2010

QLD Blades (Queensland)	3–3	(Australian Capital Territory) Canberra Lakers
Dwyer 28'; De Young 32'; Whetton 61'	Report	Turner 22', 45'; Archibald 35'

Stadium:
Queensland State Hockey Centre, Brisbane

25 August 2010

WA Thundersticks (Western Australia)	5–1	(Northern Territory) NT Stingers
Mitton 6', 37', 57'; Boyne 14'; Burcher 50'	Report	Lockley 33'

Stadium:
Queensland State Hockey Centre, Brisbane

27 August 2010

QLD Blades (Queensland)	6–0	(Western Australia) WA Thundersticks
Gohdes 11', 57'; M. Bates 32'; Wilson 35', 36'; Whetton 52'	Report

Stadium:
Queensland State Hockey Centre, Brisbane

27 August 2010

Canberra Lakers (Australian Capital Territory)	2–2	(Northern Territory) NT Stingers
Turner 34'; Wallace 64'	Report	Abbott 18', 30'

Stadium:
Queensland State Hockey Centre, Brisbane

==== Classification matches ====
===== Seventh and eighth place =====
28 August 2010

Southern Hotshots (South Australia)	1–3	(Northern Territory) NT Stingers
Hughes 56'	Report	Gabriel 22'; Tribe 31'; Abbott 36'

Stadium:
Queensland State Hockey Centre, Brisbane

===== Fifth and sixth place =====
28 August 2010

Tassie Tigers (Tasmania)	2–7	(Australian Capital Territory) Canberra Lakers
Deavin 5'; Tremayne 49'	Report	Turner 15', 15', 42'; Wallace 48'; Gilson 50'; Backhus 58'; Davidson 67'

Stadium:
Queensland State Hockey Centre, Brisbane

===== Third and fourth place =====
28 August 2010

VIC Vikings (Victoria (state))	2–1	(Western Australia) WA Thundersticks
Ford 5'; Wischusen 55'	Report	Burcher 56'

Stadium:
Queensland State Hockey Centre, Brisbane

===== Final =====
28 August 2010

NSW Waratahs (New South Wales)	1–7	(Queensland) QLD Blades
Miller 21'	Report	Dwyer 3'; Hammond 6'; Whetton 29', 62'; De Young 41'; T. Bates 53'; Wilson 70'

Stadium:
Queensland State Hockey Centre, Brisbane

== Statistics ==
=== Goalscorers ===
There were 255 goals scored in 44 matches, for an average of 5.8 goals per match.

13 goals

- (Australian Capital Territory) Glenn Turner
- (New South Wales) Joshua Miller

12 goals

- (Queensland) Jacob Whetton

11 goals

- (Western Australia) Trent Mitton

10 goals

- (Queensland) Jason Wilson
- (Victoria (state)) Russell Ford

9 goals

- (New South Wales) Simon Orchard
- (Northern Territory) Desmond Abbott

8 goals

- (New South Wales) Mark Paterson

6 goals

- (Australian Capital Territory) Jack Wallace
- (Queensland) Liam de Young
- (South Australia) Thomas Wickham
- (Tasmania) Geoffrey Cock
- (Victoria (state)) Alastair McLennan

5 goals

- (New South Wales) Troy Sutherland
- (Queensland) Jamie Dwyer
- (Queensland) Matthew Gohdes
- (Tasmania) Timothy Deavin
- (Tasmania) Edward Ockenden
- (Victoria (state)) Daniel Mirecki
- (Western Australia) Travis Taylor

4 goals

- (South Australia) Grant Schubert
- (Victoria (state)) Paul MacKinnon
- (Victoria (state)) Timothy Wischusen
- (Western Australia) Ian Burcher

3 goals

- (Australian Capital Territory) Garry Backhus
- (Australian Capital Territory) Kenji Hinde
- (New South Wales) Kieran Govers
- (New South Wales) Eli Matheson
- (Northern Territory) Travis Carroll
- (Queensland) Michael Bates
- (Queensland) Robert Hammond
- (Victoria (state)) James Webster

2 goals

- (Australian Capital Territory) Ryan Archibald
- (New South Wales) Matthew Butturini
- (New South Wales) Thomas Lobsey
- (Northern Territory) Jason Gabriel
- (Northern Territory) Adrian Lockley
- (Queensland) Timothy Bates
- (Queensland) Jacob Burns
- (South Australia) Matthew Claxton
- (South Australia) Scott Hughes
- (Tasmania) Nicholas Tremayne
- (Victoria (state)) Glenn Simpson
- (Western Australia) Craig Boyne
- (Western Australia) Fergus Kavanagh
- (Western Australia) Alastair Park

1 goal

- (Australian Capital Territory) Daniel Conroy
- (Australian Capital Territory) Ian Davidson
- (Australian Capital Territory) Evan Gilson
- (Australian Capital Territory) Daniel Hotchkis
- (New South Wales) Andrew Todd
- (Northern Territory) Jonathan Ginolfi
- (Northern Territory) Benjamin Poulton
- (Northern Territory) Cody Tribe
- (Queensland) Troy Elder
- (Queensland) Mark Knowles
- (South Australia) Fraser Bowden
- (South Australia) Daniel Cox
- (South Australia) Jake Stacy
- (Tasmania) Paul Ancher
- (Tasmania) Adam Clifford
- (Tasmania) Warren Lucas
- (Tasmania) Phillip Marshall
- (Tasmania) Dougal Middleton
- (Tasmania) William Shaw
- (Tasmania) Heath Simpson
- (Victoria (state)) Andrew Philpott
- (Victoria (state)) Joshua Pollard
- (Western Australia) Matthew Boyce
- (Western Australia) Brent Dancer
- (Western Australia) Gregory Hearn
- (Western Australia) Andrew Jacobs
- (Western Australia) Gregory Reece

Source: Clearing House
