= 2011 Men's Australian Hockey League =

Tournament details
- Host country: Australia
- Teams: 8
- Venue(s): 5 (in 5 host cities)

Final positions
- Champions: (Western Australia) WA Thundersticks (9th title)
- Runner-up: (New South Wales) NSW Waratahs
- Third place: (Victoria (state)) VIC Vikings

Tournament statistics
- Matches played: 44
- Goals scored: 257 (5.84 per match)
- Top scorer(s): (Australian Capital Territory) Wouter Hermkens (New South Wales) Matthew Butturini (Western Australia) Sam Pike (11 goals)
- Best player: (Tasmania) Eddie Ockenden

The 2011 Men's Australian Hockey League was the 21st edition of the men's field hockey tournament. The finals week of the tournament was held in the New South Wales city of Sydney.

The WA Thundersticks won the gold medal for the ninth time by defeating the NSW Waratahs 4–3 in the final.

== Competition format ==
The format included five-round matches over two weekends and a finals week that consisted of two-round matches and three pool matches for a place in the final.

After all the round matches were complete the teams were ranked 1–8 depending on the total number of points earned in all their round matches.

The teams ranked 1, 4, 5 & 8 went into pool A and the teams ranked 2, 3, 6 & 7 went into pool B. All previously earned points were removed with the teams in each pool playing each other once more. At the completion of the pool matches the teams in each pool were ranked again 1–4 depending on the number of points accumulated, with the top team from each pool competing in the League Final and classification matches to determine the remaining six team's final positions.

== Teams ==
- (Australian Capital Territory) Canberra Lakers
- (South Australia) Southern Hotshots
- (New South Wales) NSW Waratahs
- (Tasmania) Tassie Tigers
- (Northern Territory) NT Stingers
- (Victoria (state)) VIC Vikings
- (Queensland) QLD Blades
- (Western Australia) WA Thundersticks

== Venues ==
Sydney	2011 Men's Australian Hockey League is located in Australia	
Sydney Olympic Park	2011 Men's Australian Hockey League is located in Australia	
Capacity: 8,000	2011 Men's Australian Hockey League is located in Australia	
Perth	2011 Men's Australian Hockey League is located in Australia	
Perth Hockey Stadium	2011 Men's Australian Hockey League is located in Australia	
Capacity: 6,000	2011 Men's Australian Hockey League is located in Australia	
Canberra	Darwin	Hobart
National Hockey Centre	Marrara Hockey Centre	Tasmanian Hockey Centre

== Results ==
=== Preliminary round ===
Pos	Team	Pld	W	D	L	GF	GA	GD	Pts	Qualification
1	(Queensland) QLD Blades	7	6	1	0	23	8	+15	19	Pool A
2	(Western Australia) WA Thundersticks	7	6	0	1	24	11	+13	18	Pool B
3	(Victoria (state)) VIC Vikings	7	4	0	3	20	21	−1	12	Pool B
4	(New South Wales) NSW Waratahs	7	3	0	4	27	24	+3	9	Pool A
5	(Australian Capital Territory) Canberra Lakers	7	2	3	2	24	23	+1	9	Pool A
6	(Tasmania) Tassie Tigers	7	2	2	3	19	22	−3	8	Pool B
7	(Northern Territory) NT Stingers	7	1	2	4	12	26	−14	5	Pool B
8	(South Australia) Southern Hotshots	7	0	0	7	11	25	−14	0	Pool A

Source: Clearing House

==== Round matches ====
10 June 2011
17:00

VIC Vikings (Victoria (state))	5–2	(New South Wales) NSW Waratahs
Webster 3'; McLennan 11'; Simpson 24'; Ciriello 46', 54'	Report	Govers 2'; Butturini 44'

Stadium:
National Hockey Centre, Canberra

10 June 2011
18:00

NT Stingers (Northern Territory)	2–1	(South Australia) Southern Hotshots
Carroll 7'; A. Lockley 27'	Report	Webber 45'

Stadium:
Marrara Hockey Centre, Darwin

10 June 2011
19:00

Canberra Lakers (Australian Capital Territory)	3–3	(Tasmania) Tassie Tigers
Turner 11', 62'; Howson 45'	Report	Cock 10'; Doerner 34'; Middleton 51'

Stadium:
National Hockey Centre, Canberra

10 June 2011
20:00

QLD Blades (Queensland)	3–1	(Western Australia) WA Thundersticks
Gohdes 25'; Smith 64', 68'	Report	Schubert 70'

Stadium:
Marrara Hockey Centre, Darwin

11 June 2011
15:00

Tassie Tigers (Tasmania)	1–3	(Victoria (state)) VIC Vikings
Ockenden 46'	Report	Simpson 26'; Ciriello 43'; McKinnon 53'

Stadium:
National Hockey Centre, Canberra

11 June 2011
17:00

Canberra Lakers (Australian Capital Territory)	3–7	(New South Wales) NSW Waratahs
McGlaughlin 14'; Devlin 41'; Turner 46'	Report	Ogilvie 1', 5'; Pearce 11'; Butturini 30'; Govers 49', 65'; Lobsey 52'

Stadium:
National Hockey Centre, Canberra

11 June 2011
17:00

WA Thundersticks (Western Australia)	3–0	(South Australia) Southern Hotshots
Kavanagh 2'; Schubert 4', 40'	Report

Stadium:
Marrara Hockey Centre, Darwin

11 June 2011
19:00

QLD Blades (Queensland)	2–1	(Northern Territory) NT Stingers
T. Bates 35'; Swann 70+'	Report	Carroll 56'

Stadium:
Marrara Hockey Centre, Darwin

12 June 2011
13:00

NSW Waratahs (New South Wales)	2–7	(Tasmania) Tassie Tigers
Imer 13'; Govers 66'	Report	Doerner 8', 12', 16', 29'; Ockenden 25', 32', 56'

Stadium:
National Hockey Centre, Canberra

12 June 2011
15:00

VIC Vikings (Victoria (state))	3–5	(Australian Capital Territory) Canberra Lakers
Webster 5', 25'; McKinnon 56'	Report	Turner 15'; Kershaw 21'; McGlaughlin 23'; Wallace 51'; Hotchkis 69'

Stadium:
National Hockey Centre, Canberra

12 June 2011
17:00

Southern Hotshots (South Australia)	2–3	(Queensland) QLD Blades
Stacy 50'; Oliver 67'	Report	Dillion 7'; Swann 29'; Wilson 60'

Stadium:
Marrara Hockey Centre, Darwin

12 June 2011
19:00

NT Stingers (Northern Territory)	1–5	(Western Australia) WA Thundersticks
Carroll 35'	Report	Pike 18', 37', 39'; Mitton 29'; Kavanagh 65'

Stadium:
Marrara Hockey Centre, Darwin

25 June 2011
12:00

NSW Waratahs (New South Wales)	1–3	(Queensland) QLD Blades
Lobsey 46'	Report	Wilson 14'; T. Bates 20'; Gohdes 29'

Stadium:
Tasmanian Hockey Centre, Hobart

25 June 2011
12:00

Canberra Lakers (Australian Capital Territory)	1–2	(Western Australia) WA Thundersticks
Turner 58'	Report	Charlesworth 6'; Mitton 20'

Stadium:
Perth Hockey Stadium, Perth

25 June 2011
14:00

Tassie Tigers (Tasmania)	2–2	(Northern Territory) NT Stingers
Doerner 43'; Tremayne 62'	Report	A. Lockley 26'; Carroll 69'

Stadium:
Tasmanian Hockey Centre, Hobart

25 June 2011
14:00

Southern Hotshots (South Australia)	4–5	(Victoria (state)) VIC Vikings
Faizal 38', 40', 65'; Oliver 63'	Report	Mirecki 6'; Kleinschmidt 26'; Webster 28', 43'; Ford 51'

Stadium:
Perth Hockey Stadium, Perth

26 June 2011
12:00

NT Stingers (Northern Territory)	1–9	(New South Wales) NSW Waratahs
Hill 31'	Report	Pearce 4', 22', 28'; Butturini 5', 15'; M. Paterson 7'; Miller 11'; Lobsey 51'; Willis 70'

Stadium:
Tasmanian Hockey Centre, Hobart

26 June 2011
12:00

WA Thundersticks (Western Australia)	3–1	(Victoria (state)) VIC Vikings
Mitton 4'; Park 6'; Dancer 63'	Report	Mirecki 13'

Stadium:
Perth Hockey Stadium, Perth

26 June 2011
14:00

QLD Blades (Queensland)	5–1	(Tasmania) Tassie Tigers
Dillion 13'; Knowles 49'; Swann 61'; M. Bates 66'; Whetton 69'	Report	Lawler 18'

Stadium:
Tasmanian Hockey Centre, Hobart

26 June 2011
14:00

Southern Hotshots (South Australia)	2–6	(Australian Capital Territory) Canberra Lakers
Webber 18'; McGregor 65'	Report	Hotchkis 30'; Hermkens 32', 45'; Judge 38'; Borrett 51'; Turner 58'

Stadium:
Perth Hockey Stadium, Perth

6 August 2011
14:00

Tassie Tigers (Tasmania)	3–6	(Western Australia) WA Thundersticks
Marshall 32'; Cock 40'; Middleton 67'	Report	Boyne 30', 54'; Pike 27'; Dancer 30'; Park 53'; Mitton 69'

Stadium:
Sydney Olympic Park, Sydney

6 August 2011
16:00

QLD Blades (Queensland)	5–0	(Victoria (state)) VIC Vikings
Gibbs 4'; Gohdes 31', 55'; T. Bates 57'; M. Bates 70'	Report

Stadium:
Sydney Olympic Park, Sydney

6 August 2011
18:00

NT Stingers (Northern Territory)	4–4	(Australian Capital Territory) Canberra Lakers
Carroll 1'; J. Lockley 24'; A. Lockley 32'; Hill 61'	Report	Hawes 12'; Hermkens 17', 39', 48'

Stadium:
Sydney Olympic Park, Sydney

6 August 2011
20:00

NSW Waratahs (New South Wales)	4–1	(South Australia) Southern Hotshots
T. White 50'; Pearce 52', 65'; Butturini 55'	Report	Hughes 24'

Stadium:
Sydney Olympic Park, Sydney

7 August 2011
14:00

VIC Vikings (Victoria (state))	3–1	(Northern Territory) NT Stingers
Ciriello 8'; McLennan 19'; Kleinschmidt 22'	Report	Gabriel 3'

Stadium:
Sydney Olympic Park, Sydney

7 August 2011
16:00

Southern Hotshots (South Australia)	1–2	(Tasmania) Tassie Tigers
Stacy 47'	Report	McCambridge 29', 61'

Stadium:
Sydney Olympic Park, Sydney

7 August 2011
18:00

WA Thundersticks (Western Australia)	4–2	(New South Wales) NSW Waratahs
Mitton 6', 47', 70'; Jacobs 49'	Report	M. Paterson 30'; Miller 67'

Stadium:
Sydney Olympic Park, Sydney

7 August 2011
20:00

Canberra Lakers (Australian Capital Territory)	2–2	(Queensland) QLD Blades
Judge 24', 59'	Report	Gohdes 47'; Garske 70'

Stadium:
Sydney Olympic Park, Sydney

=== Classification round ===
==== Pool matches ====
===== Pool A =====
Pos	Team	Pld	W	D	L	GF	GA	GD	Pts
1	(New South Wales) NSW Waratahs	3	2	0	1	13	6	+7	6
2	(Australian Capital Territory) Canberra Lakers	3	2	0	1	13	8	+5	6
3	(Queensland) QLD Blades	3	1	0	2	5	7	−2	3
4	(South Australia) Southern Hotshots	3	1	0	2	4	14	−10	3

Source: Clearing House

9 August 2011
12:00

NSW Waratahs (New South Wales)	3–5	(Australian Capital Territory) Canberra Lakers
I. Paterson 30'; Butturini 63', 64'	Report	Hermkens 5', 17'; Borrett 41'; Davidson 45'; Turner 46'

Stadium:
Sydney Olympic Park, Sydney

9 August 2011
16:00

QLD Blades (Queensland)	1–2	(South Australia) Southern Hotshots
Garske 19'	Report	McGregor 32'; O'Shea 54'

Stadium:
Sydney Olympic Park, Sydney

10 August 2011
12:00

NSW Waratahs (New South Wales)	6–1	(South Australia) Southern Hotshots
Miller 35', 67'; Butturini 57', 58'; M. Paterson 64'; Pearce 68'	Report	Oliver 52'

Stadium:
Sydney Olympic Park, Sydney

10 August 2011
18:00

QLD Blades (Queensland)	4–1	(Australian Capital Territory) Canberra Lakers
Wilson 22'; Gohdes 46'; Beale 56'; Gibbs 65'	Report	Hermkens 25'

Stadium:
Sydney Olympic Park, Sydney

12 August 2011
12:00

Canberra Lakers (Australian Capital Territory)	7–1	(South Australia) Southern Hotshots
Turner 9', 37'; Judge 30', 63'; Hermkens 41'; Borrett 53'; Wallace 64'	Report	Wickham 18'

Stadium:
Sydney Olympic Park, Sydney

12 August 2011
14:00

QLD Blades (Queensland)	0–4	(New South Wales) NSW Waratahs
	Report	Miller 13'; Lobsey 30'; Butturini 49'; White 62'

Stadium:
Sydney Olympic Park, Sydney

===== Pool B =====
Pos	Team	Pld	W	D	L	GF	GA	GD	Pts
1	(Western Australia) WA Thundersticks	3	3	0	0	10	4	+6	9
2	(Victoria (state)) VIC Vikings	3	2	0	1	16	7	+9	6
3	(Tasmania) Tassie Tigers	3	1	0	2	5	14	−9	3
4	(Northern Territory) NT Stingers	3	0	0	3	5	11	−6	0

Source: Clearing House

9 August 2011
14:00

VIC Vikings (Victoria (state))	9–1	(Tasmania) Tassie Tigers
Wischusen 3', 61'; Ciriello 15'; Ellis 25'; Ford 47', 65'; Webster 54'; Simpson 57'; Fraser 67'	Report	McCambridge 4'

Stadium:
Sydney Olympic Park, Sydney

9 August 2011
18:00

WA Thundersticks (Western Australia)	3–1	(Northern Territory) NT Stingers
Pike 7'; Jacobs 17'; Boyne 53'	Report	Gabriel 70'

Stadium:
Sydney Olympic Park, Sydney

10 August 2011
14:00

VIC Vikings (Victoria (state))	6–3	(Northern Territory) NT Stingers
Wischusen 1'; Ford 21'; McKinnon 32', 67'; Ciriello 46'; Webster 61'	Report	Carroll 41'; Haami-Jones 43'; Poulton 65'

Stadium:
Sydney Olympic Park, Sydney

10 August 2011
16:00

WA Thundersticks (Western Australia)	4–2	(Tasmania) Tassie Tigers
Boyne 12'; Mitton 24'; Pike 55', 62'	Report	Ancher 8'; Ockenden 59'

Stadium:
Sydney Olympic Park, Sydney

12 August 2011
10:00

Tassie Tigers (Tasmania)	2–1	(Northern Territory) NT Stingers
McCambridge 42'; Budgeon 56'	Report	Poulton 66'

Stadium:
Sydney Olympic Park, Sydney

12 August 2011
16:00

WA Thundersticks (Western Australia)	3–1	(Victoria (state)) VIC Vikings
Pike 23', 35'; Boyne 26'	Report	Ellis 11'

Stadium:
Sydney Olympic Park, Sydney

==== Classification matches ====
===== Seventh and eighth place =====
13 August 2011
09:00

Southern Hotshots (South Australia)	2–3	(Northern Territory) NT Stingers
Wickham 23'; Claxton 67'	Report	Lockley 7', 11', 39'

Stadium:
Sydney Olympic Park, Sydney

===== Fifth and sixth place =====
13 August 2011
11:00

QLD Blades (Queensland)	5–1	(Tasmania) Tassie Tigers
Wilson 7', 42'; Garske 26'; Bates 64'; Beale 65'	Report	Cock 44'

Stadium:
Sydney Olympic Park, Sydney

===== Third and fourth place =====
13 August 2011
13:00

Canberra Lakers (Australian Capital Territory)	3–5	(Victoria (state)) VIC Vikings
Kershaw 53'; Hermkens 58', 66'	Report	Webster 5'; Ciriello 25', 31'; Kleinschmidt 42'; McKinnon 54'

Stadium:
Sydney Olympic Park, Sydney

===== Final =====
13 August 2011
15:00

NSW Waratahs (New South Wales)	3–4	(Western Australia) WA Thundersticks
Butturini 7'; Pearce 29'; Paterson 65'	Report	Boyne 19'; Pike 37', 69'; Dancer 46'

Stadium:
Sydney Olympic Park, Sydney

== Awards ==
Top Goalscorers	Player of the Tournament	Player of the Final
(Australian Capital Territory) Wouter Hermkens (Western Australia) Sam Pike	(Tasmania) Eddie Ockenden	(Western Australia) Sam Pike

== Statistics ==
=== Final standings ===
Pos	Team	Pld	W	D	L	GF	GA	GD	Pts	Final Result
1st place, gold medalist(s)	(Western Australia) WA Thundersticks	11	10	0	1	38	18	+20	30	Gold Medal
2nd place, silver medalist(s)	(New South Wales) NSW Waratahs	11	5	0	6	43	34	+9	15	Silver Medal
3rd place, bronze medalist(s)	(Victoria (state)) VIC Vikings	11	7	0	4	41	31	+10	21	Bronze Medal
4	(Australian Capital Territory) Canberra Lakers	11	4	3	4	40	36	+4	15	
5	(Queensland) QLD Blades	11	8	1	2	33	16	+17	25	
6	(Tasmania) Tassie Tigers	11	3	2	6	25	41	−16	11	
7	(Northern Territory) NT Stingers	11	2	2	7	20	39	−19	8	
8	(South Australia) Southern Hotshots	11	1	0	10	17	42	−25	3	

Source: Clearing House
