= 2011 Sultan Azlan Shah Cup =

Field hockey tournament

- Official logo of the tournament

Tournament details
- Host country: Malaysia
- City: Ipoh
- Dates: 5 – 15 May
- Teams: 7
- Venue: Azlan Shah Stadium

Final positions
- Champions: Australia (6th title)
- Runner-up: Pakistan
- Third place: Great Britain

Tournament statistics
- Matches played: 24
- Goals scored: 115 (4.79 per match)
- Best player: (Pakistan) Shakeel Abbasi

The 2011 Sultan Azlan Shah Cup is the 20th edition of the Sultan Azlan Shah Cup. It was held from 5–15 May 2011 in Ipoh, Perak, Malaysia.

== Participating nations ==
Seven countries participated in this year's tournament:

- Australia
- India
- South Korea
- Malaysia
- New Zealand
- Pakistan
- Great Britain

== Results ==
All times are Malaysia Standard Time (UTC+08:00)

=== Pool ===
Pos	Team	Pld	W	D	L	GF	GA	GD	Pts	Qualification
1	Australia	6	5	1	0	18	8	+10	16	Final
2	Pakistan	6	4	0	2	17	15	+2	12	Final
3	Great Britain	6	3	0	3	12	12	0	9	Third Place Match
4	New Zealand	6	2	1	3	16	17	−1	7	Third Place Match
5	India	6	2	1	3	15	17	−2	7	Fifth Place Match
6	South Korea	6	2	1	3	12	15	−3	7	Fifth Place Match
7	Malaysia	6	1	0	5	11	17	−6	3	

Source: Azlan Shah Cup
Rules for classification: 1) points; 2) goal difference; 3) goals scored; 4) head-to-head result.

5 May 2011
16:05

New Zealand	2–4	Pakistan
Hayward 59'; Inglis 63'	Report	Rizwan Sr. 3'; Shah 24'; Khan 51'; Bhutta 61'

Umpires:
Satoshi Kondo (JPN)
Karupusamy Lingam (MAS)

5 May 2011
18:05

South Korea	3–2	India
Cho 31'; Yoon 41'; Jang 56'	Report	Diwakar 20'; Mujtaba 27'

Umpires:
Martin Madden (GBR)
David Tomlinson (NZL)

5 May 2011
20:05

Great Britain	3–1	Malaysia
Tindall 17'; Smith 35'; Moore 51'	Report	Tengku 41'

Umpires:
Roderick Wijsmuller (NED)
Waqas Ahmad Butt (PAK)

6 May 2011
16:05

Pakistan	4–2	South Korea
Butt 21'; Abbas 63'; Khan 64'; Akbar 70'	Report	Hyun 13', 46'

Umpires:
Levi Stephen (AUS)
Roderick Wijsmuller (NED)

6 May 2011
18:05

Great Britain	1–3	India
Tindall 62'	Report	Rupinder Pal 10', 55', 57'

Umpires:
Karupusamy Lingam (MAS)
Yoon Shin-Dong (KOR)

6 May 2011
20:05

Malaysia	1–2	Australia
Tengku 23'	Report	Orchard 59'; Wilson 70'

Umpires:
Martin Madden (SCO)
Ripudaman Sharma (IND)

8 May 2011
16:05

Australia	1–1	India
Whetton 14'	Report	Rupinder Pal 23'

Umpires:
Yoon Shin-Dong (KOR)
Roderick Wijsmuller (NED)

8 May 2011
18:05

Great Britain	3–2	Pakistan
Moore 8'; Clarke 39', 63'	Report	Abbas 31'; Khan 64'

Umpires:
Satoshi Kondo (JPN)
David Tomlinson (NZL)

8 May 2011
20:05

South Korea	1–1	New Zealand
Jang 58'	Report	Collier 50'

Umpires:
Ripudaman Sharma (IND)
Waqas Ahmad Butt (PAK)

9 May 2011
16:05

Pakistan	1–5	Australia
Abbas 28'	Report	Orchard 23', 41'; Wilson 34', 55'; Ciriello 51'

Umpires:
Martin Madden (GBR)
Karupusamy Lingam (MAS)

9 May 2011
18:05

New Zealand	1–3	Great Britain
Neal 60'	Report	R. Mantell 14'; Clarke 51'; Alexander 55'

Umpires:
Satoshi Kondo (JPN)
Ripudaman Sharma (IND)

9 May 2011
20:05

India	5–2	Malaysia
Minz 8'; Antil 18', 69'; Rupinder Pal 22'; Sunil 35'	Report	Azammi 34'; Shahrun 43'

Umpires:
David Tomlinson (NZL)
Levi Stephen (AUS)

11 May 2011
16:05

Malaysia	2–3	New Zealand
Izzat 30'; Faizal 68'	Report	Wilson 16'; Jenness 57'; Edwards 70'

Umpires:
Levi Stephen (AUS)
Yoon Shin-Dong (KOR)

11 May 2011
18:05

Australia	4–2	South Korea
Deavin 8'; Paterson 12', 67'; Turner 34'	Report	You 15'; Hyun 39'

Umpires:
Satoshi Kondo (JPN)
Waqas Ahmad Butt (PAK)

11 May 2011
20:05

India	1–3	Pakistan
Rupinder Pal 22'	Report	Bhutta 49'; Imran 56'; Abbas 57'

Umpires:
Roderick Wijsmuller (NED)
Martin Madden (GBR)

12 May 2011
16:05

Australia	2–1	Great Britain
Dancer 8'; Ciriello 29'	Report	R. Mantell 57'

Umpires:
David Tomlinson (NZL)
Roderick Wijsmuller (NED)

12 May 2011
18:05

India	3–7	New Zealand
Sunil 20'; Gurwinder 26', 41'	Report	Wilson 24'; Hilton 32', 64'; Hayward 46', 57'; L'huillier 52'; Neal 58'

Umpires:
Levi Stephen (AUS)
Kurupusamy Lingam (MAS)

12 May 2011
20:05

Malaysia	3–1	South Korea
Nabil 43'; Faizal 58'; Izwan 67'	Report	Nam 17'

Umpires:
Satoshi Kondo (JPN)
Ripudaman Sharma (IND)

14 May 2011
16:05

South Korea	3–1	Great Britain
Yoon 10'; Jeon B. 23'; You 41'	Report	Daly 20'

Umpires:
Ripudaman Sharma (IND)
Karupusamy Lingam (MAS)

14 May 2011
18:05

Pakistan	3–2	Malaysia
Abbas 15'; Waqas 21'; Abbasi 51'	Report	Hafifihafiz 35'; Razie 57'

Umpires:
Levi Stephen (AUS)
Yoon Shin-Dong (KOR)

14 May 2011
20:05

New Zealand	2–4	Australia
Edwards 31'; Child 68'	Report	Dancer 12'; Turner 15', 16'; Ciriello 28'

Umpires:
Roderick Wijsmuller (NED)
Martin Madden (SCO)

=== Classification ===
==== Fifth and sixth place ====
15 May 2011
15:35

India	1–2	South Korea
Vikram 41'	Report	Nam 11'; Jang 21'

Umpires:
David Tomlinson (NZL)
Karupusamy Lingam (MAS)

==== Third and fourth place ====
15 May 2011
18:05

Great Britain	4–2	New Zealand
R. Mantell 34'; Moore 53'; Smith 59'; Daly 65'	Report	Jenness 20'; Hilton 69'

Umpires:
Satoshi Kondo (JPN)
Waqas Ahmad Butt (PAK)

==== Final ====
15 May 2011
20:35

Australia	3–2	Pakistan
Ciriello 11', 83'; Turner 44'	Report	Abbas 31'; Butt 62'

Umpires:
Roderick Wijsmuller (NED)
Martin Madden (GBR)

== Awards ==
=== Individual awards ===
The following awards were presented at the conclusion of the tournament:

Player of the Tournament	Top Goalscorers	Goalkeeper of the Tournament	Fair Play Award
(Pakistan) Shakeel Abbasi	(India) Rupinder Pal Singh (Pakistan) Sohail Abbas	(Malaysia) Kumar Subramaniam	India; Pakistan

=== All Star team ===
The following players were named in the Azlan Shah All Star team at the conclusion of the tournament:

Goalkeeper	Defense	Midfield	Forward
(Malaysia) Kumar Subramaniam	(Australia) Fergus Kavanagh (United Kingdom) Glenn Kirkham (India) Rupinder Pal Singh (New Zealand) Dean Couzins	(Australia) Simon Orchard (New Zealand) Steven Edwards (Pakistan) Shakeel Abbasi	(Australia) Glenn Turner (Malaysia) Tengku Ahmad Tajuddin (South Korea) You Hyo-Sik

== Statistics ==
=== Final standings ===
Pos	Team	Pld	W	D	L	GF	GA	GD	Pts	Qualification
1st place, gold medalist(s)	Australia	7	6	1	0	21	10	+11	19	Gold Medal
2nd place, silver medalist(s)	Pakistan	7	4	0	3	19	18	+1	12	Silver Medal
3rd place, bronze medalist(s)	Great Britain	7	4	0	3	16	14	+2	12	Bronze Medal
4	New Zealand	7	2	1	4	18	21	−3	7	
5	South Korea	7	3	1	3	14	16	−2	10	
6	India	7	2	1	4	16	19	−3	7	
7	Malaysia	6	1	0	5	11	17	−6	3	

Source: Azlan Shah Cup

=== Goalscorers ===
There were 115 goals scored in 24 matches, for an average of 4.79 goals per match.

6 goals

- (India) Rupinder Pal Singh
- (Pakistan) Sohail Abbas

5 goals

- (Australia) Christopher Ciriello

4 goals

- (Australia) Glenn Turner

3 goals

- (Australia) Simon Orchard
- (Australia) Jason Wilson
- (United Kingdom) Jonathan Clarke
- (United Kingdom) Richard Mantell
- (United Kingdom) Robert Moore
- (New Zealand) Andrew Hayward
- (New Zealand) Blair Hilton
- (Pakistan) Abdul Haseem Khan
- (South Korea) Hyun Hye-Sung
- (South Korea) Jang Jong-Hyun

2 goals

- (Australia) Brent Dancer
- (Australia) Mark Paterson
- (United Kingdom) Matthew Daly
- (United Kingdom) Richard Smith
- (United Kingdom) James Tindall
- (India) Mandeep Antil
- (India) Gurwinder Singh Chandi
- (India) S.V. Sunil
- (Malaysia) Faizal Saari
- (Malaysia) Tengku Ahmad Tajuddin
- (New Zealand) Steven Edwards
- (New Zealand) Stephen Jenness
- (New Zealand) Shay Neal
- (New Zealand) Nicholas Wilson
- (Pakistan) Muhammad Umar Bhutta
- (Pakistan) Rehan Butt
- (South Korea) You Hyo-Sik
- (South Korea) Nam Hyun-Woo
- (South Korea) Yoon Sung-Hoon

1 goal

- (Australia) Timothy Deavin
- (Australia) Jacob Whetton
- (United Kingdom) Richard Alexander
- (India) Roshan Minz
- (India) Danish Mujtaba
- (India) Vikram Pillay
- (India) Diwakar Ram
- (Malaysia) Muhammad Azammi
- (Malaysia) Nabil Fiqri
- (Malaysia) Izwan Firdaus
- (Malaysia) Hafifihafiz Hanafi
- (Malaysia) Muhammad Izzat
- (Malaysia) Shahrun Nabil
- (Malaysia) Razie Rahim
- (New Zealand) Marcus Child
- (New Zealand) Benjamin Collier
- (New Zealand) Hugo Inglis
- (New Zealand) Matt L'Huillier
- (Pakistan) Shakeel Abbasi
- (Pakistan) Waqas Akbar
- (Pakistan) Muhammad Imran
- (Pakistan) Muhammad Rizwan Sr.
- (Pakistan) Syed Kashif Shah
- (Pakistan) Muhammad Waqas
- (South Korea) Jeon Byung-Jin
- (South Korea) Cho Suk-Hoon
