= Matt Gohdes =

Australian field hockey player (born 1990)

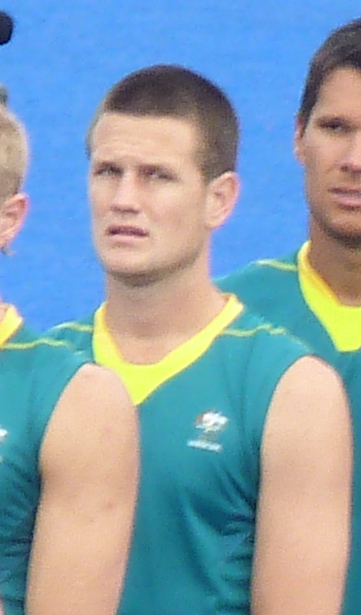
- Gohdes in 2012

Personal information
- Nickname: Gohdesy
- Nationality: Australian
- Born: Matthew Gohdes; 8 May 1990 (age 36) Rockhampton, Queensland
- Height: 5 ft 11 in (180 cm)
- Weight: 80 kg (176 lb)

Sport
- Country: Australia
- Sport: Field hockey
- Event: Men's team
- Club: QLD Blades
Medal record
Men's field hockey
Representing Australia
Olympic Games
Bronze medal – third place	2012 London	Team
World Cup
Gold medal – first place	2014 The Hague	Team
Champions Trophy
Gold medal – first place	2010 Mönchengladbach	Team
Bronze medal – third place	2014 Bhubaneswar	Team
Commonwealth Games
Gold medal – first place	2014 Glasgow	Team

Matthew Gohdes (born 18 May 1990) is an Australian field hockey player. He plays for the Queensland Blades in the Australian Hockey League. He made his debut for the Australia men's national field hockey team in 2009 during a five-game test series in Kuala Lumpur, Malaysia. He won a gold medal at the 2010 Men's Hockey Champions Trophy and a bronze medal at the 2012 Summer Olympics.

== Personal ==
Gohdes is from Rockhampton, Queensland. His cousin is former national team teammate Jamie Dwyer. Gohdes never played a game with his cousin until he was named to the national team. His flatmate was teammate Matthew Swann.

Gohdes is married to fellow former Australian representative, Jill Gohdes. The couple married in December 2015 and have one child.

== Field hockey ==
Gohdes plays in the Australian Hockey League for the Queensland Blades. In 2010, he played in the final game of the season for his state team in the Australian Hockey League. He played for the Queensland Blades in the first found of the 2011 season. He currently plays for the Delhi Waveriders in the Hockey India League

In 2009, Gohdes, Jonathon Charlesworth and Brent Dancer made their national team debut during a five-game test series in Kuala Lumpur, Malaysia against Malaysia. He was a member of the national team in 2010. That year, he was a member of the team that finished first at the Hockey Champions Trophy. In December 2011, he was named as one of twenty-eight players to be on the 2012 Summer Olympics Australian men's national training squad. This squad was narrowed in June 2012. He trained with the team from 18 January to mid-March in Perth, Western Australia. In February during the training camp, he played in a four nations test series with the teams being the Kookaburras, Australia A Squad, the Netherlands and Argentina. He played for the Kookaburras in their 3–1 victory over the Australian A team in the first round of the competition. He scored the team's first goal in the first five minutes of the game. He later scored the team's third goal. In a game for the Kookaburras against Argentina, his team won 4–0 and he scored a goal. He is one of several Queensland based players likely to play in a three-game test series to be played in Cairns, Queensland from 22 to 25 June against the New Zealand's Black Stickss. Final Olympic section will occur several days before this test and his inclusion in the series will be contingent upon being selected.

He was selected for the 2012 Summer Olympics, where Australia won a bronze medal. He was part of the Australian team that won gold at the 2014 Commonwealth Games.
