= Shay Neal =

New Zealand field hockey player

Personal information
- Born: 4 June 1990 (age 36) Whangārei, New Zealand
- Height: 1.76 m (5 ft 9 in)

Sport
- Sport: Field hockey
National team
Years	Team	Caps	Goals
–	New Zealand		-

Shay Neal (born 4 June 1990) is a New Zealand field hockey player. He represented his country at the 2016 Summer Olympics in Rio de Janeiro, where the men's team came seventh. His sister Brooke is also a representative Hockey player.
