= Barry Dancer =

Australian field hockey player

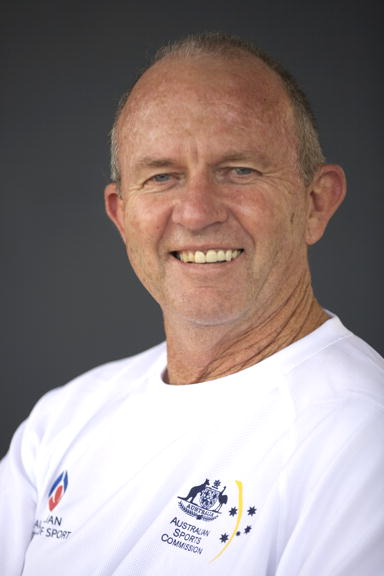
- Barry Dancer Australian Men's Hockey Coach 2008

Personal information
- Born: 27 August 1952 (age 74) Brisbane, Queensland, Australia
Medal record
Men's field hockey
Representing Australia
Olympic Games
Silver medal – second place	1976 Montreal	Team competition

Barry John Dancer (born 27 August 1952) is a former Australian field hockey player and coach of Australian men's national field hockey team.

As a player he competed in 48 international matches for Australia between 1973 and 1979. he was a member of the men's hockey team that won a silver medal at the 1976 Summer Olympics.

Dancer coached the English men's hockey team from 1997 to 1999 and the Great Britain team at the 2000 Summer Olympics, where the team came sixth. Dancer took up the position of Head Coach of the Australian men's national field hockey team in 2001 and retired the position after 2008 Summer Olympics.

Coaching results for the Australian team at major competitions:

- 2001: 2nd - Champions Trophy
- 2002: 2nd - World Cup; 5th - Champions Trophy; 1st - Commonwealth Games
- 2003: 2nd - Champions Trophy
- 2004: 1st - Athens Olympics
- 2005: 1st - Champions Trophy
- 2006: 2nd - World Cup; 4th -Champions Trophy; 1st - Commonwealth Games
- 2007: 2nd - Champions Trophy
- 2008: 3rd - Beijing Olympics; 1st - Champions Trophy

Australia won its first Olympic gold medal at the 2004 Athens Olympics.

Dancer was Head Coach of the Australian Institute of Sport men's hockey program from 2001 to 2008.

His son Brent Dancer has represented Australia in hockey.

In 2026, he was inducted into the Sport Australia Hall of Fame as a general member.
