= Tim Deavin =

Australian field hockey player (born 1984)

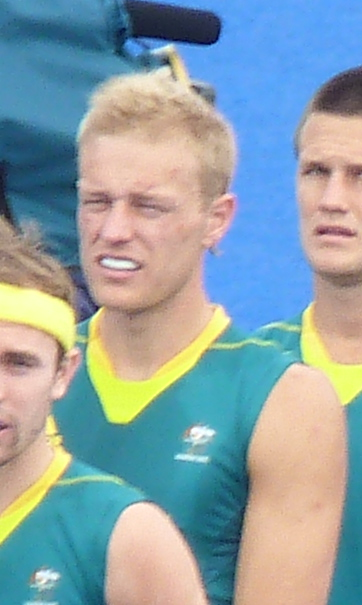
- Deavin in 2012

Personal information
- Born: Timothy Deavin; 27 July 1986 (age 40) Launceston, Tasmania, Australia
- Height: 182 cm (6 ft 0 in)
- Weight: 85 kg (187 lb)

Sport
- Sport: Field hockey
- Position: Fullback
Senior career
Years	Team	Caps	Goals
2019 - current	Fremantle hockey club	-	-
2016–present	Ranchi Rays	-	-
National team
Years	Team	Caps	Goals
2010–2016	Australia	138	(8)
2025–present	Australia indoor	0	-
Medal record
Men's field hockey
Representing Australia
World Cup
Gold medal – first place	2014 The Hague	Team
Olympic Games
Bronze medal – third place	2012 London	Team
Bronze medal – third place	2016 Rio	Team
Champions Trophy
Gold medal – first place	2016 London	Team
Bronze medal – third place	2014 Bhubaneswar	Team
Gold medal – first place	2011 Auckland	Team
Gold medal – first place	2010 Mönchengladbach	Team
World League
Gold medal – first place	2015 Raipur	Team
Gold medal – first place	2015 Antwerp	Team
Silver medal – second place	2013 Rotterdam	Team
AHL Hockey one
Gold medal – first place	2014 Adelaide	Team
Bronze medal – third place	2015 Gold Coast	Team
Silver medal – second place	2018	Team
Hockey 9s
Gold medal – first place	2011 Perth	Team
Gold medal – first place	2012 Perth	Team
Gold medal – first place	2013 Perth	Team
Azlan Shah Cup
Bronze medal – third place	2010 Ipoh	Team
Gold medal – first place	2011 Ipoh	Team
Gold medal – first place	2013 Ipoh	Team
FIH Indoor World Cup
Bronze medal – third place	2011 Poznan	Team
Bronze medal – third place	2025 Porec	Team
- Updated on 16 January 2025

Tim Deavin (born 27 July 1984) is an Australian field hockey player. He plays predominantly as a fullback for the Kookaburras, the Australian men's national hockey team. Deavin made his first appearance for the senior national team in 2010.

== Personal ==
Deavin is from Tasmania. He attended Scotch Oakburn College. In 2010, he moved to Perth, Western Australia, to join the Kookaburras. In 2014, Deavin was barred from playing with his team, Tamar Churinga, in Tasmania's Greater Northern Hockey League due to complaints about his professional performance. Deavin defied his ban a few weeks later when he played against the Queechy Penguins. In May 2023 Deavin was involved in opening Floreat's The Park pub in Perth into a new Sporting Globe sports bar. [Perthnow, Western Australia].

== Field hockey ==
Deavin plays as a defender, but can and has played centre-half, midfield and striker for the Kookaburras.

=== Club hockey ===
Deavin Started his playing career playing at Scotch Oakburn College and Tamar Churinga Hockey Club in Launceston. He then moved to Hobart where he occasionally plays for the Derwent Strikers in the Southern Men's Hockey League. In 2008 and 2009 he won the league's men's best and fairest hockey award. In 2010, he was with the team, playing for them in the grand final. During the 2005/06 season, Deavin was part of Doncaster's team in the English National League, earning the title of Player of the League. He later played in New Zealand's national league, representing Southern (Otago) in 2006 and Midlands in 2012 and 2014, where he achieved the league's runner-up status and was named MVP of the tournament. In 2013, Deavin competed for the Kuala Lumpur Hockey Club in the Malaysian National League, leading the team to a championship victory. Currently, he serves as the player-coach for the Premier 1 Men's team at the Fremantle Cockburn Hockey Club.

=== State team ===
Deavin plays for the Tassie Tigers in the Australian Hockey League(2014 Champions). He was with the team in 2008, 2010 and 2011. He had a severe foot injury in 2011 that kept him away from Tassie Tigers in the Australian Hockey League.

=== National team ===
Deavin made his national team debut in 2010. In 2010 and 2011, he won a gold medal at the Champions Trophy's in Germany and New Zealand. He Played in the Sultan Azlan Shah Cup in Malaysia in 2010 (3rd), 2011 (1st) and 2013 (1st) where he was named in the Azlan Shah Cup Eleven. In December 2011, he was named as one of twenty-eight players to be on the 2012 Summer Olympics Australian men's national training squad. In February 2012 he played in a four nations test series with the teams being the Kookaburras, Australia A Squad, the Netherlands and Argentina, where Australia won.
