= Tim Pullman =

Personal information
- Nationality: Australian
- Born: Libya

Sport
- Country: Australia
- Sport: Field hockey

Tim Pullman is an international field hockey umpire from Australia who has officiated over 150 international games since his debut in 1999 including two consecutive Summer Olympics. Prior to umpiring he represented South Australia as a field hockey player from junior through to the National League competition.

== Personal ==
Tim lives in Adelaide, South Australia. He is an accountant and works as a Senior Consultant at Oreon Partners in South Australia.

== Playing hockey ==
Tim played hockey for South Australian club the Burnside Bulldogs from junior through to senior competition. He represented South Australia as a junior right through to the Australian Hockey League.

== Domestic Australian hockey umpire ==
Tim umpires regularly as part of the Metropolitan Competition Premier League run in Adelaide by Hockey SA.

He has also officiated in the Australian Hockey League from 1999 to 2014. In October 2014, he officiated the AHL Gold Medal match in front of his home Adelaide crowd, a match between the WA Thundersticks and Tassie Tigers which was won by the Tassie Tigers in a shoot-out.

== International hockey umpire ==
Tim has umpired at an international level for over 15 years.

His first international was between Canada and India at a 4-nations event in Canberra in 1999. Since then he has travelled to major tournaments all round the world including the Junior World Cup in Hobart in 2001, 2 Commonwealth Games, 1 Champions Trophy and 1 World Cup.

He was one of only five Australian umpires chosen in the 'Road to Rio' Olympic Umpiring Project by the FIH Umpiring Committee where he went on to officiate at his second consecutive Summer Olympics in Rio de Janeiro.

Tournaments where he has officiated include:

- Field hockey at the 2012 Summer Olympics (London)
- 2014 Men's Hockey World Cup (The Hague)
- 2010 Men's Hockey World Cup (New Delhi)
- 2003, 2004, 2006 FIH Champion's Trophy (Amsterdam, Lahore, Terrassa)
- 2013 FIH World League (Rotterdam)
- 2012–13 Men's FIH Hockey World League Semifinals (New Delhi)
- 2011 Champion's Challenge (Johannesburg)
- 2009 European Championships (Amsterdam)
- 2006 Asian Games (Doha)
- 2002, 2010 Commonwealth Games (Manchester, New Delhi)
- Men's field hockey Qualifying Tournaments for the 2012 Summer Olympics
- FIH Olympic Qualifying Events (Auckland, New Delhi)
- FIH World Cup Qualifying Event (Invercargill)
- 2013 Men's Hockey Junior World Cup (New Delhi) and 2002 Junior World Cup (Hobart)

== Recognition ==
In 2010, he was awarded the male Australian Official of the Year by Hockey Australia, an award that recognizes someone who:

- must be currently actively officiating within Australia
- is also officiating at national and/or international level
- met a high level of achievement during the twelve-month period, by either improvement/development or achievement
- contributes to development of officiating in Australia – at club, regional, state or national level.

In 2011, Tim was presented with his golden whistle after umpiring his 100th senior international match at the Champions Challenge 1 in Johannesburg. Seif Ahmed, the FIH's representative at the tournament, made the presentation after the game between Malaysia and Canada.
