= Dean Butler (field hockey) =

Australian field hockey player

Medal record

Men's field hockey

Representing Australia

Olympic Games
Gold medal – first place	2004 Athens	Team

World Cup
Silver medal – second place	2002 Kuala Lumpur	Team
Silver medal – second place	2006 Mönchengladbach	Team

Champions Trophy
Gold medal – first place	2005 Chennai	Team
Silver medal – second place	2001 Rotterdam	Team
Silver medal – second place	2003 Amstelveen	Team
Silver medal – second place	2007 Kuala Lumpur	Team
Bronze medal – third place	1998 Lahore	Team

Commonwealth Games
Gold medal – first place	2002 Manchester	Team
Gold medal – first place	2006 Melbourne	Team

Dean Butler OAM (born 26 January 1977 in Warwick, Queensland) is a field hockey defender from Australia, who was a member of the team that won the gold medal at the 2004 Summer Olympics in Athens.

He is nicknamed Butts, and played club hockey for the Queensland Blades in his native country, with whom he won the national title in 2003. Butler was promoted to the senior squad following the 1998 Men's Hockey World Cup. In 2001 he was named Player of the Year in Queensland.
