= Kiel Brown =

Australian field hockey player (born 1984)

Personal information
- Nationality: Australian
- Born: May 1984 (age 42) Toowoomba, Queensland

Sport
- Country: Australia
- Sport: Field hockey
- Event: Men's team
Medal record
Men's field hockey
Representing Australia
Olympic Games
Bronze medal – third place	2008 Beijing	Team
Champions Trophy
Gold medal – first place	2008 Rotterdam	Team
Gold medal – first place	2011 Auckland	Team
Gold medal – first place	2012 Melbourne	Team
Commonwealth Games
Gold medal – first place	2014 Glasgow	Team
World Cup
Gold medal – first place	2010 New Delhi	Team

Kiel Brown (born May 1984) is an Australian field hockey player. He earned a bronze medal at the 2008 Summer Olympics and a gold medal at the 2011 Men's Hockey Champions Trophy.

== Personal ==
Brown was born in May 1984 in Toowoomba, Queensland. He is from Western Australia. He is currently a university student, at Curtin University where he is studying psychology.

In 2008, Brown gave a Melbourne-based reporter a tour of the 2008 Summer Olympics athlete quarters. He and his teammates brought blow up toys to the games, including blow up boxing kangaroos and crocodiles. He and his teammates also set up a slushy machine in their area of the athlete village. He was given a welcome pack when he got there that included "body wash, hand sanitiser and a USB drive." It did not contain condoms, an item which had been distributed to 2004 Summer Olympics competitors.

== Field hockey ==
Brown is a midfielder.

=== Club hockey ===
Brown plays club hockey for Wesley South Perth and was with the team in 2007. He played in the 22nd round of the Men's Wizard Home Loans Cup against YMCA Coastal City where his team lost 6–2. He did not compete in the 2007 season finale because he was called up to the national team.

=== National team ===
Brown's first senior national cap came in 2007 against the Netherlands. He competed in the 2007 Champions Trophy competition for Australia. In December 2007, he was a member of the Kookaburras squad that competed in the Dutch Series in Canberra. In January 2008, he was a member of the senior national team that competed at the Five Nations men's hockey tournament in South Africa. In 2008, he competed at and earned a bronze medal at the 2008 Summer Olympics. These were his first Olympic Games. New national team coach Ric Charlesworth named him, a returning member, and fourteen total new players who had few than 10 national team caps to the squad before in April 2009 in a bid to ready the team for the 2010 Commonwealth Games. In 2010, he won a gold medal at the Delhi hosted World Cup. He and Rob Hammond were considered by team coaches as one of the major contributors to the team in helping them secure their medal. In May 2011, he played in the Azlan Shah Cup for Australia. The Cup featured teams from Pakistan, Malaysia, India, South Korea, Britain and New Zealand. In December 2011, he was named as one of twenty-eight players to be on the 2012 Summer Olympics Australian men's national training squad. This squad will be narrowed in June 2012. He trained with the team from 18 January to mid-March in Perth, Western Australia. In February during the training camp, he played in a four nations test series with the teams being the Kookaburras, Australia A Squad, the Netherlands and Argentina. At the 2014 Commonwealth Games, he was part of the Australian team that won the gold medal.
