= Jonathon Charlesworth =

Australian field hockey player

Personal information
- Nationality: Australian

Sport
- Country: Australia
- Sport: Field hockey
- Event: Men's team
- Team: WA Thundersticks

Jonathon Charlesworth is an Australian field hockey player. He is a medical doctor. In field hockey, he plays in the midfield and wears a white headband. He played for the WA Thundersticks in the Australian Hockey League, winning a championship with the team in 2008. He joined the Kookaburras in 2009, where he was coached by his father Ric Charlesworth. He is trying to earn a spot on the national team that will represent Australia at the 2012 Summer Olympics.

== Personal ==
Charlesworth is from Western Australia. When he was younger, he played soccer because of the game's similarities to field hockey. He is a medical doctor like his father, Ric Charlesworth.

== Field hockey ==
Charlesworth is a midfielder. He started playing field hockey when he was six years old. Like his father, he wears a white headband while playing.

=== State team ===
Charlesworth started playing for the WA Thundersticks of the Australian Hockey League in 2005. He played in the league finals in 2009. In 2008, he was a member of the WA Thundersticks that won the league championships, with a score of 6–2 against the Queensland Blades in a match held in Canberra. In the match, he scored a goal.

=== National team ===
Prior to joining the Kookaburras, Charlesworth had represented Australia internationally as a member of Australia A team when they played games against Malaysia and Canada. In 2009, he and Brent Dancer made their national team debut during a five-game test series in Kuala Lumpur, Malaysia against Malaysia. The pair's debut was notable because both players are the sons of famous Australian field hockey coaches: Charlesworth's father is Ric Charlesworth, the current coach of the men's senior team and Dancer's father is Barry Dancer who coached the men's field hockey team to their first Olympic gold in 2004. In May 2011, he played in the Azlan Shah Cup for Australia. The Cup featured teams from Pakistan, Malaysia, India, South Korea, Britain and New Zealand. In December 2011, he was named as one of twenty-eight players to be on the 2012 Summer Olympics Australian men's national training squad. This squad will be narrowed in June 2012. He trained with the team from 18 January to mid-March in Perth, Western Australia. In February during the training camp, he played in a four nations test series with the teams being the Kookaburras, Australia A Squad, the Netherlands and Argentina.
