= Eli Matheson =

Australian field hockey player

Medal record

Men's field hockey

Representing Australia

Olympic Games
Bronze medal – third place	2008 Beijing	Team

Champions Trophy
Gold medal – first place	2008 Rotterdam	Team

Eli Matheson (born 12 July 1983 in Lithgow, New South Wales) is a field hockey striker who represented Australia at the 2008 Summer Olympics in Beijing. He currently works as an architectural model maker in Perth.
