= Robert Hammond (field hockey) =

Australian field hockey player (born 1981)

Rob Hammond
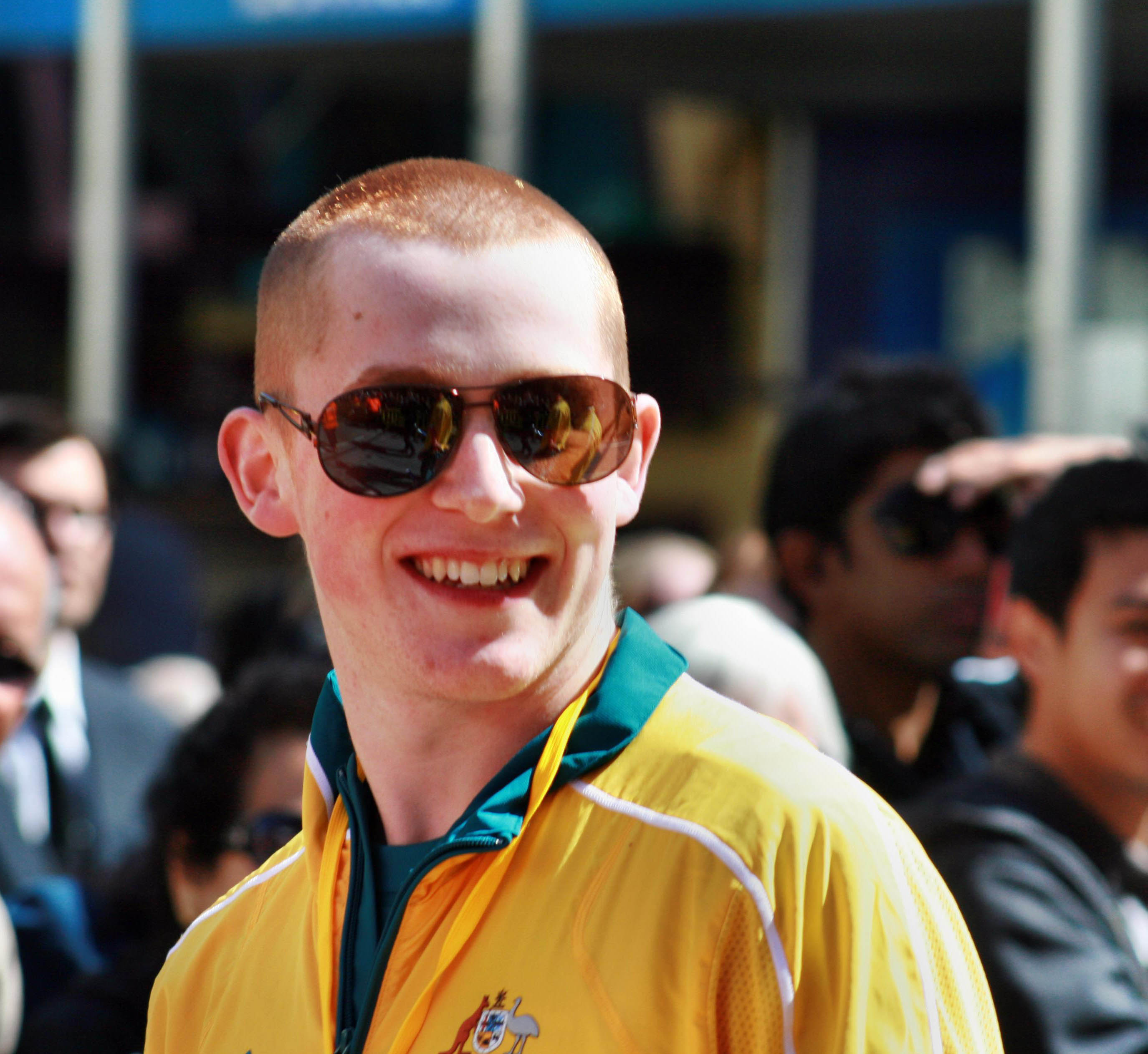

Personal information
- Nationality: Australian

Sport
- Country: Australia
- Sport: Field hockey
- Event: Men's team
Medal record
Men's field hockey
Representing Australia
Olympic Games
| Gold medal – first place | 2004 Athens | Team |
| Bronze medal – third place | 2008 Beijing | Team |
World Cup
| Gold medal – first place | 2010 New Delhi | Team |
| Gold medal – first place | 2014 The Hague | Team |
| Silver medal – second place | 2006 Mönchengladbach | Team |
Oceania Cup
| Gold medal – first place | 2013 Stratford | Team |
Commonwealth Games
| Gold medal – first place | 2006 Melbourne | Team |
| Gold medal – first place | 2010 Delhi | Team |
Champions Trophy
| Gold medal – first place | 2008 Rotterdam | Team |
| Gold medal – first place | 2009 Melbourne | Team |
| Silver medal – second place | 2003 Amstelveen | Team |
| Silver medal – second place | 2007 Kuala Lumpur | Team |

Robert Hammond OAM (born 6 May 1981) is an Australian field hockey player from Queensland. He has played hockey on the state level. He has been a consistent member of the Australia men's national field hockey team. He was with the team when they won a gold medal at the 2004 Summer Olympics and a bronze medal at the 2008 Summer Olympics. He is competing for a spot on the team to represent the country at the 2012 Summer Olympics. He was also a member of the team that won a gold medal at the 2010 Men's Hockey Champions Trophy.

== Personal ==
Hammond was born in 1981 in Queensland.

== Field hockey ==
In 1999, Hammond had a scholarship with and played for the Australian Institute of Sport team. He has represented his state in the Australian Hockey League, playing for them in the final game of the 2010 season.

=== National team ===
Hammond is a member of the Australia men's national field hockey team. In 2007, he did not compete in the Oceania Olympic qualifying tournament. In December 2007, Hammond played Kookaburras squad that competed in the Dutch Series in Canberra. In 2006, he represented Australia at the Azlan Shah tournament in Malaysia. In 2007, he was injured and not able to play for Australia. He was temporarily replaced on the roster by Kiel Brown. In January 2008, he was a member of the senior national team that competed at the Five Nations men's hockey tournament in South Africa. New national team coach Ric Charlesworth named him, a returning member, alongside fourteen total new players who had few than 10 national team caps to the squad before in April 2009 in a bid to ready the team for the 2010 Commonwealth Games. In 2009, he was a member of the national team during a five-game test series in Kuala Lumpur, Malaysia against Malaysia. He was on the squad in 2010. That year, he was a member of the team that finished first at the Hockey Champions Trophy. In 2010, he was part of the team that won the World Cup in India. He and Kiel Brown were considered by team coaches as one of the major contributors to the team in helping them secure their medal.

==== Olympics ====
Hammond won a gold medal at the 2004 Summer Olympics and a bronze medal at the 2008 Summer Olympics. He scored a goal in the bronze medal game against the Netherlands in the country's 6–1 victory. In December 2011, he was named as one of twenty-eight players to be on the 2012 Summer Olympics Australian men's national training squad. This squad will be narrowed in June 2012. He trained with the team from 18 January to mid-March in Perth, Western Australia. In February during the training camp, he played in a four nations test series with the teams being the Kookaburras, Australia A Squad, the Netherlands and Argentina. He played for the Australian A team in their 3–1 loss to the Kookaburras in the first round of the competition. He is one of several Queensland based players likely to play in a three-game test series to be played in Cairns, Queensland from 22 to 25 June against the New Zealand's Black Stickss. Final Olympic section will occur several days before this test and his inclusion in the series will be contingent upon being selected.

In the 2005 Australia Day Honours Hammond was awarded the Medal of the Order of Australia (OAM).

=== Professional hockey ===
In 2010 and 2011, he played professional hockey in the Netherlands for Oranje Zwart.
