= Ian Burcher =

Australian field hockey player

Personal information
- Nationality: Australian

Sport
- Country: Australia
- Sport: Field hockey
- Event: Men's team

Ian Burcher is an Australian field hockey player.

== Personal ==
He is from Western Australia.

== Field hockey ==
=== National team ===
In 2009, he was a member of the national team during a five-game test series in Kuala Lumpur, Malaysia against Malaysia.

In December 2011, he was named as one of fourteen players to be on the 2012 Summer Olympics Australian men's national Olympic development squad. While this squad is not in the top twenty-eight and separate from the Olympic training coach, the Australian coach Ric Charlesworth did not rule out selecting from only the training squad, with players from the Olympic development having a chance at possibly being called up to represent Australia at the Olympics. He trained with the team from 18 January to mid-March in Perth, Western Australia.
