= Benjamin Collier =

New Zealand field hockey player

Benjamin Collier (born 19 June 1984) is a New Zealand field hockey player who competed in the 2008 Summer Olympics.
