= Des Abbott =

Australian field hockey player

Personal information
- Nationality: Australian
- Born: Desmond Abbott; 10 January 1986 (age 40) Darwin, Northern Territory

Sport
- Country: Australia
- Sport: Field hockey
- Event: Men's team
- Club: Aquinas Reds
- Team: NT Stingers
- Retired: 2013

Achievements and titles
- Olympic finals: 2008
Medal record
Men's field hockey
Representing Australia
Olympic Games
| Bronze medal – third place | 2008 Beijing | Team |
Champions Trophy
| Gold medal – first place | 2008 Rotterdam | Team |
| Gold medal – first place | 2009 | Team |
| Gold medal – first place | 2010 Mönchengladbach | Team |
Hockey at the Commonwealth Games
| Gold medal – first place | 2010 Delhi | Team |

Desmond Abbott (born 10 January 1986 in Darwin, Northern Territory) is an Australian field hockey midfield/striker. He is a member of the Australia men's national field hockey team, having made his debut on 28 January 2007. He won gold medals at the Hockey Champions Trophy in 2008, 2009 and 2010, and a gold medal at the 2010 Commonwealth Games. He won a bronze medal at the 2008 Summer Olympics and unsuccessfully tried to secure a spot on the team to represent Australia at the 2012 Summer Olympics.

== Personal ==
Abbott was born on 10 January 1986 in Darwin, Northern Territory, and is an Australian aboriginal. His first name is Desmond but he is called Des. One of his hobbies is playing Australian rules football. He works for a water corporation. His uncle is Joe Daby, one of the best ever Northern Territory field hockey players. He is recognized in the Australian Olympic Committee list of Australian Indigenous Olympians.

== Field hockey ==
Abbott plays midfield and striker. When playing for the national team, he wears guernsey 32. He plays club hockey for the Aquinas Reds. He plays for the NT Stingers in the Australian Hockey League, where he wears shirt number 17. He played in a June 2010 game for the NT Stingers against the Western Australia that Western Australia won 4–1. He scored a goal in the game. In January 2005, he was a member of Australia's U21 national team and played in a five-game test series against Malaysia in Brisbane. He was one of four Darwin, Northern Territory based players on the squad. In June 2005, he was one of five Northern Territory players to represent Australia on the U21 team at the World Cup. In 2009, he played professional hockey in the Netherlands.

=== National team ===
Abbott had his first cap for the senior side on 28 January 2007. during the Dutch Series in Canberra. In January 2008, he was a member of the senior national team that competed at the Five Nations men's hockey tournament in South Africa. He won the Hockey Champions Trophy in 2008, 2009 and 2010. He was a member of the 2009 Champions Trophy winning team, playing in the gold medal match against Germany that Australia won by a score of 5–3. He was a member of the Australian side that took home gold at the 2010 Commonwealth Games and the 2010 World Cup.

Abbott competed at the 2008 Summer Olympics where he won a bronze medal. In Australia's first game at the 2008 Games, he scored three goals in the game against Canada. He was the first Aboriginal to represent Australia at the Games in men's field hockey. He scored a goal in the bronze medal game against the Netherlands in the country's 6–1 victory. New national team coach Ric Charlesworth named him, a returning member, alongside fourteen total new players who had few than 10 national team caps to the squad before in April 2009 in a bid to ready the team for the 2010 Commonwealth Games. He did not compete at the Azlan Shah Cup in Malaysia in May 2011 because he was injured. In December 2011, he was named as one of twenty-eight players to be on the 2012 Summer Olympics Australian men's national training squad. This squad will be narrowed in June 2012. He trained with the team from 18 January to mid-March in Perth, Western Australia. He was one of two players from the Northern Territory named to the squad. In February during the training camp, he played in a four nations test series with the teams being the Kookaburras, Australia A Squad, the Netherlands and Argentina. He missed part of the training camp because of a strained quad.

== Recognition ==
In 2009, he was nominated for the Qantas NT Sportsperson of the Year. He was nominated as the International Hockey Federation 2008 Young Men's Player of the Year, where he finished second.
