= Glenn Turner (field hockey) =

Australian field hockey player (born 1984)

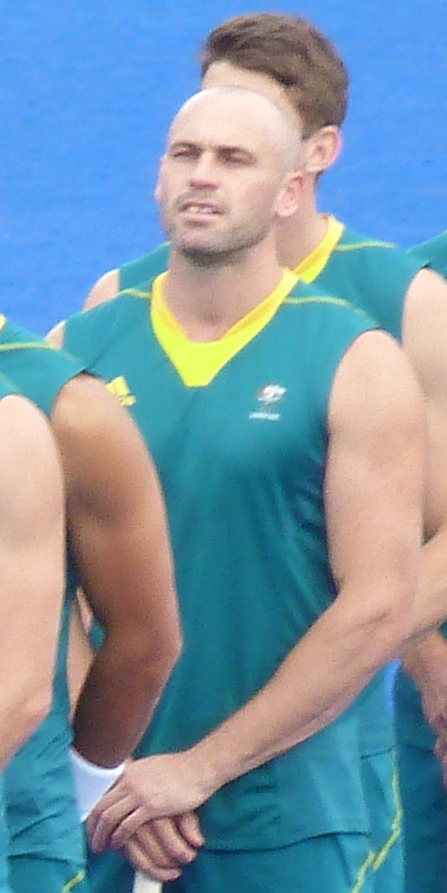

Personal information
- Born: 1 May 1984 (age 42) Goulburn, New South Wales, Australia

Sport
- Sport: Field hockey
- Position: Striker
Senior career
Years	Team	Caps	Goals
2006-present	Canberra Lakers/Canberra Chill	-	-
2012–2013	Mumbai Magicians	-	-
2014–2015	Dabang Mumbai	-	-
2016–present	Kalinga Lancers	-	-
National team
Years	Team	Caps	Goals
2009–present	Australia	124	(90)
Medal record
Men's field hockey
Representing Australia
Olympic Games
Bronze medal – third place	2012 London	Team
World Cup
Gold medal – first place	2010 Delhi	Team
Gold medal – first place	2014 The Hague	Team
Commonwealth Games
Gold medal – first place	2010 Delhi	Team
- Updated on 25 January 2016

Glenn Turner (born 1 May 1984) is an Australian professional field hockey player from the Australian Capital Territory. He is a member of Australia men's national field hockey team and won a gold medal with them at the 2010 Commonwealth Games and a bronze medal at the 2012 Olympic Games. Turner also competed at the 2016 Olympic Games.

== Personal ==
Turner is from the Australian Capital Territory. In November 2011, he had surgery.

== Career ==
Turner is a striker. In state and territory based competitions, he represents the Australian Capital Territory. In 2006, 2007 and 2008 he represented the side as a member of the Canberra Lakers. He was a member of the Canberra Lakers in 2010. In a June game against the Tassie Tigers that his side lost 2–1, he scored his team's only goal. In 2011, was again with the team. He played for the team in the first round of the 2011 season.

Turner is a member of the Kookaburras. In December 2007, he competed in the Dutch Series in Canberra. In 2009, he was a member of the national team during a five-game test series in Kuala Lumpur, Malaysia against Malaysia. He represented the country at the 2010 Commonwealth Games. In the gold medal match against India that Australia won 8–0, he scored a goal. In 2011, he was a member of the national team that competed at the Azlan Shah Cup in Malaysia. He had hip surgery during 2011 that kept him away from the national team for a while.

In December 2011, Turner was named as one of twenty-eight players to be on the 2012 Summer Olympics Australian men's national training squad. This squad will be narrowed in June 2012. He trained with the team from 18 January to mid-March in Perth, Western Australia. His inclusion as possible 2012 Olympian came after having only made regular appearances with the team shortly before that decision was made. In February during the training camp, he played in a four nations test series with the teams being the Kookaburras, Australia A Squad, the Netherlands and Argentina. He played for Kookaburras during the series. He scored a goal in his team's 2–1 victory over the Netherlands. In late February 2012, the Goulburn Workers Club in Goulburn, New South Wales hosted a fundraising event to help local Olympians, including Turner, compete at the 2012 Summer Olympics by assisting them financially.
