= Daniel Hotchkis =

Australian field hockey player

Personal information
- Nickname: Hotty
- Nationality: Australian
- Born: Daniel; 15 November 1985 (age 40)

Sport
- Country: Australia
- Sport: Field hockey
- Event: Men's team

Daniel Hotchkis is an Australian field hockey player. He played state level hockey for the Canberra Lakers in the Australian Hockey League. He has been a member of the Australia men's national field hockey team, nicknamed the Kookaburras.

== Personal ==
Hotchkis is from the Australian Capital Territory and he calls Canberra his home town. His nickname is Hotty. When not playing hockey, he is a reporting specialist in the public sector.

== Field hockey ==
Hotchkis is a midfielder and striker. He started playing the sport when he was six years old, playing junior hockey for Central and Marist.

Hotchkis played club hockey with the Central Hockey Club of Canberra. He was playing with the club in 2006. His club had a three-week losing streak going into the senior men's ACT grand final. He was with Central in 2010 and 2012. As of 12 June 2012, he had played in 8 games for the season and had yet to score a goal.

Hotchkis plays for the Canberra Lakers in the Australian Hockey League as a midfielder and has been with the team starting in 2002 and was with the team As of 2011. During his 2009 time with the team, he scored three goals, had one green card and 1 yellow card. He played for the team in the 2010 season, finishing off scoring 71 goals in 12 games while wearing shirt number 3. He played for the team in the first found of the 2011 season. In a second-round game in 2011 against South Australia that the Lakers won 6–2, he scored a goal in the 30th minute. He was with the team again for 2011/2012 courtesy of an ACTAS scholarship. His state based play is sponsored by Jamison Travel.

=== National team ===
Hotchkis has played for Australia men's national junior field hockey team. In 2005, he played for the team at the Rabobank Men's Junior World Cup in Rotterdam.

In January 2008, Hotchkis made his senior national team debut at the Five Nations men's hockey tournament in South Africa. In December 2011, he was named as one of fourteen players to be on the 2012 Summer Olympics Australian men's national Olympic development squad. While this squad is not in the top twenty-eight and separate from the Olympic training coach, the Australian coach Ric Charlesworth did not rule out selecting from only the training squad, with players from the Olympic development having a chance at possibly being called up to represent Australia at the Olympics. He trained with the team from 18 January to mid-March in Perth, Western Australia. He played for Australia's A Team in games against Argentina and the Netherlands during the team's February training camp in Perth, Western Australia.
