= Mark Paterson (field hockey) =

Australian field hockey player (born 1985)

Personal information
- Born: 9 January 1985 (age 41) Sydney, New South Wales

Sport
- Sport: Field hockey
- Position: Attacker
- Club: NSW Waratahs
National team
Years	Team	Caps	Goals
2008–2012	Australia		-
Medal record
Men's field hockey
Representing Australia
Champions Trophy
Gold medal – first place	2010 Mönchengladbach	Team
Gold medal – first place	2011 Auckland	Team

Mark Paterson is an Australian field hockey player. He has played most of his Hockey career with the Glebe District Hockey Club. He plays for the New South Wales Waratahs in the Australian Hockey League. He is a member of the Australia men's national field hockey team. He is trying to make the squad that will represent Australia at the 2012 Summer Olympics.

== Personal ==
Paterson is from Croydon, New South Wales. He moved to Perth, Western Australia on a part-time basis because he was on scholarship with the Australian Institute of Sport to play hockey and the team is based there.

== Field hockey ==
Paterson played for the Glebe District Hockey Club, playing in the first grade for them in 2008, 2009 and 2012. In 2008 and 2009, he was the club's captain.

Paterson plays for the New South Wales Waratahs in the Australian Hockey League. He played in a June 2010 game for the New South Wales against the Tassie Tigers that New South Wales won 6–3. He scored a goal in the game.

=== National team ===
Paterson is a member of the Australia men's national field hockey team. New national team coach Ric Charlesworth named him and thirteen new players who had less than ten national team caps before alongside older members to the squad in April 2009 in a bid to ready the team for the 2010 Commonwealth Games. In 2009, he was a member of the team during a three-game test series against Belgium. In May 2011, he played in the Azlan Shah Cup for Australia. The Cup featured teams from Pakistan, Malaysia, India, South Korea, Britain and New Zealand. In December 2011, he was named as one of twenty-eight players to be on the 2012 Summer Olympics Australian men's national training squad. This squad will be narrowed in June 2012. He trained with the team from 18 January to mid-March in Perth, Western Australia. In February during the training camp, he played in a four nations test series with the teams being the Kookaburras, Australia A Squad, the Netherlands and Argentina. He played for the Kookoaburras against Argentina in the second game of the series where his team won 3–1. He scored a goal for his team.
