= Russell Ford =

Australian field hockey player

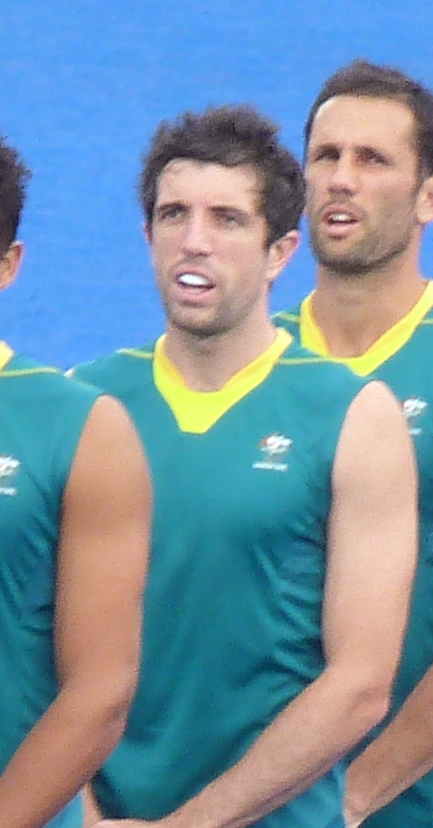
- 2012 Olympic field hockey team Australia at the Riverbank Arena before the game against Spain

Personal information
- Full name: Russell David Ford
- Nationality: Australian
- Born: 18 August 1983 (age 43)

Sport
- Country: Australia
- Sport: Field hockey
- Event: Men's team
Medal record
Men's field hockey
Representing Australia
Olympic Games
| Bronze medal – third place | 2012 London | Team |
World Cup
| Silver medal – second place | 2006 Mönchengladbach | Team |
Oceania Cup
| Gold medal – first place | 2013 Stratford | Team |
Champions Trophy
| Gold medal – first place | 2010 Mönchengladbach | Team |
| Gold medal – first place | 2012 Melbourne | Team |
| Silver medal – second place | 2007 Kuala Lumpur | Team |
| Bronze medal – third place | 2014 Bhubaneswar | Team |

Russell David Ford (born 18 August 1983) is an Australian former field hockey player. His first national team appearance was in 2006. As of July 2011, he had 21 goals from 76 appearances with the national team.

== Personal ==
Ford is from Victoria. He was born in Eltham, Victoria and lived in the town while growing up. He attended Eltham High School and was in Year 11 in 2000.

== Field hockey ==
Ford started playing hockey when he was eight years old and is a striker. He plays his club hockey for the Doncaster Hockey Club (Australia). He played for the U18 Victorian team in the national championships in 2000, where he wore shirt number 6. He played in a June 2010 game for the Victorian against the Tassie Tigers in the Australian Hockey League that Victoria won 5–4. He scored a goal in the game.

Ford's first national team international cap came in 2006 in a game against India. He did not compete at the 2006 World Cup and 2007 Champions Trophy. In 2006, he represented Australia at the Azlan Shah tournament in Malaysia. He competed in the 2007 Champions Trophy competition for Australia. In December 2007, he was a member of the Kookaburras squad that competed in the Dutch Series in Canberra. In January 2008, he was a member of the senior national team that competed at the Five Nations men's hockey tournament in South Africa. New national team coach Ric Charlesworth named him, a returning member, alongside fourteen new players who had few than 10 national team caps to the squad before in April 2009 in a bid to ready the team for the 2010 Commonwealth Games. As of July 2011, he had 21 goals from 76 appearances with the national team. In December 2011, he was named as one of twenty-eight players to be on the 2012 Summer Olympics Australian men's national training squad. This squad will be narrowed in June 2012. He trained with the team from 18 January to mid-March in Perth, Western Australia. In February during the training camp, he played in a four nations test series with the teams being the Kookaburras, Australia A Squad, the Netherlands and Argentina. He played for the Kookaburras in their 3–1 victory over the Australian A team in the first round of the competition. He scored the team's second goal of the game in the seventh minute. At the 2012 Summer Olympics, he was part of the team that won the bronze medal. He has played club hockey in the Netherlands for HC Bloemendaal and HC Tilburg.
