= Brent Dancer =

Australian field hockey player

Personal information
- Nationality: Australian
- Born: Western Australia

Sport
- Country: Australia
- Sport: Field hockey
- Event: Men's team
- Team: WA Thundersticks

Brent Dancer, is an Australian field hockey player. He is a goalscoring defender and plays for the WA Thundersticks in the Australian Hockey League, whom he won a championship with in 2008. He made his debut as a member of the Australia men's national field hockey team in 2009. He was trying to earn a place in the team to represent Australia at the 2012 Summer Olympics.

== Personal ==
Dancer is from Western Australia. He is from Perth's northern suburbs. He attended high school at Wesley College in South Perth.

He lives in Scarborough, Western Australia. His father, Barry Dancer, coached the Australian side at the 2004 Athens Olympics where Australia won a gold medal, the only men's field hockey Olympic gold medal the team has ever won. When he was younger, he played soccer because of the game's similarities to field hockey.

== Field hockey ==
Dancer is a defender/fullback. He started playing field hockey when he was six years old. His father is his personal field hockey coach. His father has also coached him as a member of the national team. He plays club hockey for a Perth area team located in the city's southern suburbs. He plays for the WA Thundersticks in the Australian Hockey League. In 2008, he was a member of the WA Thundersticks that won the league championships, with a score of 6–2 against the Queensland Blades in a match held in Canberra. In the match, he scored a goal.

=== National team ===
Dancer became involved with the Australian national team's development group in 2006. He was named to the Kookaburra training squad in early 2009. In 2009, he and Jonathon Charlesworth made their national team debut during a five-game test series in Kuala Lumpur, Malaysia, against Malaysia. The pair's debut was notable because both are the sons of famous Australian field hockey coaches: Charlesworth's father is Ric Charlesworth, the current coach of the men's senior team and Dancer's father is Barry Dancer who coached the men's field hockey team to their first Olympic gold in 2004. In May 2011, he played in the Azlan Shah Cup for Australia. The Cup featured teams from Pakistan, Malaysia, India, South Korea, Britain and New Zealand. In December 2011, he was named as one of twenty-eight players to be on the 2012 Summer Olympics Australian men's national training squad. This squad will be narrowed in June 2012. He trained with the team from 18 January to mid-March in Perth, Western Australia. In February during the training camp, he played in a four nations test series with the teams being the Kookaburras, Australia A Squad, the Netherlands and Argentina. The series was called "Hockey in the Summertime".
