= Jason Wilson (field hockey) =

Australian field hockey player

Personal information
- Nationality: Australian
- Born: 2 July 1987 (age 39)

Sport
- Country: Australia
- Sport: Field hockey
- Event: Men's team
Medal record
Men's field hockey
Representing Australia
Champions Trophy
Gold medal – first place	2010 Mönchengladbach	Team
Gold medal – first place	2011 Auckland	Team
Gold medal – first place	2012 Melbourne	Team
Hockey at the Commonwealth Games
Gold medal – first place	2010 Delhi	Team

Jason Wilson (born 2 July 1987) is an Australian field hockey striker from Kingscliff, New South Wales. He made his top-level club hockey debut in 2003. While living in New South Wales, he represented Queensland in national competitions on the junior and senior level. Wilson played more than 150 games for the QLD Men's Team from 2004 to 2015 winning 5 national titles throughout his tenure. He was a member of the Australia men's national field hockey team 2009-2015 and earned gold medals at the four Champions Trophy tournaments including 2010 Men's Hockey Champions Trophy which he was named Most Promising Player and lead the goal scoring for the tournament. He was a gold medalist at the 2010 Commonwealth Games, scoring two goals in the gold medal match to help secure the Gold.

== Personal ==
Wilson is from Kingscliff, New South Wales.

== Field hockey ==
Wilson is a striker. By the time he was seventeen years old, he had played in hockey matches in many of Australia's major cities. He first competed in top grade club hockey in 2003. In 2005, he played for the Eastern Suburbs. In 2008, he played for the Brisbane Hockey League side, Easts Tigers. He currently plays for the Delhi Waveriders in the Hockey India League

=== State team ===
Wilson represented Queensland as a U18, U21 and senior state representative while he was living in Tweed Heads, New South Wales. He was a member of all three teams in 2005. As a seventeen-year-old, six days a week, his mother would drive him 2 hours each way to Brisbane in order for him to practice with the state team. In 2008, he was a member of the Queensland state team, the Queensland Blades. He was with the team in 2010. In a June game against the Northern Territory, he scored two goals. In 2010, he played in the final game of the season for his state team in the Australian Hockey League.

=== National team ===
Wilson has played for Australia's senior national team. In 2009, he was a member of the national team during a five-game test series in Kuala Lumpur, Malaysia against Malaysia. In 2009, he represented the country on a tour of Europe. He competed in the third match of the tour against England where Australia won 5–4. He was a member of the national team in 2010. That year, he was a member of the team that finished first at the Hockey Champions Trophy. In 2010, he also represented Australia at the Commonwealth Games, and played in the game against Pakistan during the group stage. In the gold medal match against India that Australia won 8–0, he scored two goals. In May 2011, he played in the Azlan Shah Cup for Australia. The Cup featured teams from Pakistan, Malaysia, India, South Korea, Britain and New Zealand. He won gold at the 2011 Champion Trophy, playing in the finals game and having at least one shot on goal in the game. In December 2011, he was named as one of twenty-eight players to be on the 2012 Summer Olympics Australian men's national training squad. This squad will be narrowed in June 2012. He trained with the team from 18 January to mid-March in Perth, Western Australia. In February during the training camp, he played in a four nations test series with the teams being the Kookaburras, Australia A Squad, the Netherlands and Argentina. He is one of several Queensland based players likely to play in a three-game test series to be played in Cairns, Queensland from 22 to 25 June against the New Zealand's Black Stickss. Final Olympic section will occur several days before this test and his inclusion in the series will be contingent upon being selected.
