= 2017 Men's Australian Hockey League =

Tournament details
- Host country: Australia
- City: Perth
- Dates: 28 September – 8 October
- Teams: 10
- Venue: Perth Hockey Stadium

Final positions
- Champions: (Victoria (state)) VIC Vikings (4th title)
- Runner-up: (Queensland) QLD Blades
- Third place: (New South Wales) NSW Waratahs

Tournament statistics
- Matches played: 35
- Goals scored: 168 (4.8 per match)
- Top scorer(s): (Tasmania) Kieron Arthur (Victoria (state)) Chris Ciriello (9 goals)
- Best player: (Queensland) Mark Knowles

The 2017 Men's Australian Hockey League was 27th edition of the men's Australian Hockey League. The tournament was held between 28 September and 8 October 2017, in Perth, Western Australia. A total of 10 teams competed for the title.

Like the 2016 edition, invitational teams from India and New Zealand competed in the tournament.

The VIC Vikings won the tournament for the fourth time and the second year in a row, following a 3–0 penalty shoot-out win over the QLD Blades after the final finished a 1–1 draw. The NSW Waratahs won the bronze medal after defeating the India Development side 3–2 in the third place match.

== Competition format ==
Teams were split evenly into pools A and B where they compete in a single round-robin format.

At the conclusion of the initial pool stage, the top two teams in each pool progress to the medal playoffs in Pool C, while the remaining six teams progress to the classification matches in Pool D.

In Pool C, teams carry over points earned in previous matches and contest the teams they are yet to play. Final ranking in Pool C determines the final tournament standing from fifth to tenth place.

In Pool D, teams carry over points earned in previous matches and contest the teams they are yet to play. The top two teams then progress to the final, while the bottom two teams contest the third and fourth place playoff.

== Participating teams ==
Dates	Event	Location	Qualifier(s)
Host state			(Western Australia) WA Thundersticks
29 September – 8 October 2016	2016 Men's AHL	(Western Australia) Perth, WA	(Australian Capital Territory) Canberra Lakers (New South Wales) NSW Waratahs (Northern Territory) NT Stingers (Queensland) QLD Blades (South Australia) SA Hotshots (Tasmania) Tassie Tigers (Victoria (state)) VIC Vikings
Invitational Teams			IND Development; NZLDevelopment

== Results ==
=== First round ===
==== Pool A ====
Pos	Team	Pld	W	D	L	GF	GA	GD	Pts	Qualification
1	(Victoria (state)) VIC Vikings	4	3	1	0	16	5	+11	10	Medal Round
2	(Queensland) QLD Blades	4	3	0	1	21	8	+13	9	Medal Round
3	(Tasmania) Tassie Tigers	4	2	1	1	15	8	+7	7	
4	(South Australia) SA Hotshots	4	1	0	3	7	23	−16	3	
5	NZL Development	4	0	0	4	4	19	−15	0	

Source: hockeyaustralia.altiusrt.com

28 September 2017
10:30

VIC Vikings (Victoria (state))	8–2	(South Australia) SA Hotshots
Ciriello 30'; Kleinschmidt 33', 47', 50'; Arunasalam 41', 51'; Pollard 42'; Scanlon 57'	Report	Larwood 12'; Willson 14'

Perth Hockey Stadium: Pitch 1
Umpires:
Murray Grime (AUS)
Ben de Young (AUS)

28 September 2017
12:30

Tassie Tigers (Tasmania)	3–4	(Queensland) QLD Blades
Arthur 12', 45+', 48'	Report	Wotherspoon 19'; Rintala 27', 39'; Bell 50'

Perth Hockey Stadium: Pitch 1
Umpires:
James Unkles (AUS)
Matthew Claxton (AUS)

29 September 2017
13:00

VIC Vikings (Victoria (state))	4–0	NZL Development
Ford 23', 29', 31'; Hendry 50'	Report

Perth Hockey Stadium: Pitch 1
Umpires:
Zeke Newman (AUS)
Aaron Gotting (AUS)

29 September 2017
17:00

Tassie Tigers (Tasmania)	6–0	(South Australia) SA Hotshots
McHugh 10'; Arthur 20', 31'; McCambridge 28', 48'; Mackey 50'	Report

Perth Hockey Stadium: Pitch 2
Umpires:
Tim Pullman (AUS)
Ben Hocking (AUS)

30 September 2017
15:00

QLD Blades (Queensland)	6–1	NZL Development
Boyde 8', 57'; Swann 16'; Beale 30', 36'; Elder 33'	Report	Thomas 16'

Perth Hockey Stadium: Pitch 1
Umpires:
Murray Grime (AUS)
Matthew Claxton (AUS)

1 October 2017
17:00

Tassie Tigers (Tasmania)	1–1	(Victoria (state)) VIC Vikings
McCambridge 20'	Report	Ciriello 22'

Perth Hockey Stadium: Pitch 1
Umpires:
Daniel Johnston (AUS)
Gurbaj Singh (IND)

2 October 2017
17:00

SA Hotshots (South Australia)	4–0	NZL Development
Mitchell 5', 59'; Brown 20'; Bowden 44'	Report

Perth Hockey Stadium: Pitch 2
Umpires:
James Unkles (AUS)
Ben Hocking (AUS)

2 October 2017
19:00

QLD Blades (Queensland)	2–3	(Victoria (state)) VIC Vikings
Anderson 26'; Bell 57'	Report	Arunasalam 9'; Ciriello 54'; Kleinschmidt 55'

Perth Hockey Stadium: Pitch 2
Umpires:
Matthew Claxton (AUS)
Gurbaj Singh (IND)

3 October 2017
17:30

NZL Development	3–5	(Tasmania) Tassie Tigers
Lett 53'; Hyde 56'; Andrews 60+'	Report	Dick 21'; Arthur 36', 47', 50'; Ockenden 54'

Perth Hockey Stadium: Pitch 1
Umpires:
Ben de Young (AUS)
Stephen Rogers (AUS)

3 October 2017
19:30

QLD Blades (Queensland)	9–1	(South Australia) SA Hotshots
Weyer 6', 59'; Beale 12'; Elder 19', 29', 56'; Rintala 26', 43', 44'	Report	Willson 48'

Perth Hockey Stadium: Pitch 1
Umpires:
Murray Grime (AUS)
James Unkles (AUS)

==== Pool B ====
Pos	Team	Pld	W	D	L	GF	GA	GD	Pts	Qualification
1	(New South Wales) NSW Waratahs	4	4	0	0	8	1	+7	12	Medal Round
2	IND Development	4	2	1	1	7	3	+4	7	Medal Round
3	(Western Australia) WA Thundersticks	4	2	0	2	8	9	−1	6	
4	(Northern Territory) NT Stingers	4	1	1	2	5	8	−3	4	
5	(Australian Capital Territory) Canberra Lakers	4	0	0	4	4	11	−7	0	

Source: hockeyaustralia.altiusrt.com

28 September 2017
14:30

Canberra Lakers (Australian Capital Territory)	0–3	(New South Wales) NSW Waratahs
	Report	Sharp 48'; McEwen 56'; T. Craig 59'

Perth Hockey Stadium: Pitch 1
Umpires:
Stephen Rogers (AUS)
Gurbaj Singh (IND)

28 September 2017
16:30

WA Thundersticks (Western Australia)	3–1	(Northern Territory) NT Stingers
Mitton 10'; Wickham 11'; Flynn 51'	Report	Taylor 56'

Perth Hockey Stadium: Pitch 1
Umpires:
Zeke Newman (AUS)
Tim Pullman (AUS)

29 September 2017
19:00

WA Thundersticks (Western Australia)	1–4	IND Development
Flynn 56'	Report	Qureshi 6'; Yousuf 30'; Rohidas 45'; Talwinder 50'

Perth Hockey Stadium: Pitch 1
Umpires:
Stephen Rogers (AUS)
Daniel Johnston (AUS)

30 September 2017
17:00

Canberra Lakers (Australian Capital Territory)	2–3	(Northern Territory) NT Stingers
Gupte 33'; Sutherland 35'	Report	Wookey 24'; Farmilo 36', 52'

Perth Hockey Stadium: Pitch 1
Umpires:
Ben Hocking (AUS)
Ben de Young (AUS)

30 September 2017
19:00

NSW Waratahs (New South Wales)	1–0	IND Development
B. Govers 37'	Report

Perth Hockey Stadium: Pitch 1
Umpires:
Aaron Gotting (AUS)
James Unkles (AUS)

1 October 2017
19:00

Canberra Lakers (Australian Capital Territory)	2–3	(Western Australia) WA Thundersticks
Turner 30'; J. Staines 53'	Report	Main 14'; Mitton 16'; Wickham 59'

Perth Hockey Stadium: Pitch 1
Umpires:
Zeke Newman (AUS)
Ben de Young (AUS)

2 October 2017
13:00

NT Stingers (Northern Territory)	1–1	IND Development
Lockley 34'	Report	Umar 6'

Perth Hockey Stadium: Pitch 2
Umpires:
Murray Grime (AUS)
Daniel Johnston (AUS)

2 October 2017
15:00

NSW Waratahs (New South Wales)	2–1	(Western Australia) WA Thundersticks
B. Govers 50'; T. Craig 53'	Report	Mitton 12'

Perth Hockey Stadium: Pitch 2
Umpires:
Tim Pullman (AUS)
Stephen Rogers (AUS)

3 October 2017
13:30

IND Development	2–0	(Australian Capital Territory) Canberra Lakers
Yousuf 5'; Qureshi 46'	Report

Perth Hockey Stadium: Pitch 1
Umpires:
Daniel Johnston (AUS)
Ben Hocking (AUS)

3 October 2017
15:30

NSW Waratahs (New South Wales)	2–0	(Northern Territory) NT Stingers
B. Govers 43'; K. Govers 45+'	Report

Perth Hockey Stadium: Pitch 1
Umpires:
Aaron Gotting (AUS)
Tim Pullman (AUS)

=== Second round ===
==== Fifth to tenth place classification ====
===== Pool D =====
Pos	Team	Pld	W	D	L	GF	GA	GD	Pts
1	(Western Australia) WA Thundersticks	5	5	0	0	16	7	+9	15
2	(Northern Territory) NT Stingers	5	4	0	1	12	9	+3	12
3	(Tasmania) Tassie Tigers	5	3	0	2	16	8	+8	9
4	(Australian Capital Territory) Canberra Lakers	5	1	0	4	11	14	−3	3
5	NZL Development	5	1	0	4	11	18	−7	3
6	(South Australia) SA Hotshots	5	1	0	4	7	17	−10	3

Source: hockeyaustralia.altiusrt.com

5 October 2017
10:00

NZL Development	2–3	(Western Australia) WA Thundersticks
Hanks 9'; Thomas 25'	Report	Mitton 11'; Wickham 18', 23'

Perth Hockey Stadium: Pitch 2
Umpires:
Gurbaj Singh (IND)
Aaron Gotting (AUS)

5 October 2017
10:00

Tassie Tigers (Tasmania)	1–2	(Northern Territory) NT Stingers
McCambridge 3'	Report	Duguid 39'; Farmilo 49'

Perth Hockey Stadium: Pitch 1
Umpires:
Ben Hocking (AUS)
Matthew Claxton (AUS)

5 October 2017
12:00

SA Hotshots (South Australia)	1–4	(Australian Capital Territory) Canberra Lakers
Johns 53'	Report	Sutherland 5', 19'; B. Staines 35'; Turner 50'

Perth Hockey Stadium: Pitch 2
Umpires:
James Unkles(AUS)
Daniel Johnston (AUS)

6 October 2017
10:00

NZL Development	2–4	(Northern Territory) NT Stingers
Thomas 20'; Andrews 23'	Report	Hayward 15', 17', 35'; Farmilo 44'

Perth Hockey Stadium: Pitch 2
Umpires:
Ben de Young (AUS)
Daniel Johnston (AUS)

6 October 2017
10:00

Tassie Tigers (Tasmania)	3–1	(Australian Capital Territory) Canberra Lakers
Edwards 14'; McCambridge 43'; Welch 49'	Report	B. Staines 21'

Perth Hockey Stadium: Pitch 1
Umpires:
Gurbaj Singh (IND)
Matthew Claxton (AUS)

6 October 2017
12:00

SA Hotshots (South Australia)	1–5	(Western Australia) WA Thundersticks
Willson 25'	Report	Flynn 12', 13'; Mitton 20', 57', 58'

Perth Hockey Stadium: Pitch 2
Umpires:
Ben Hocking (AUS)
Aaron Gotting (AUS)

7 October 2017
10:00

NZL Development	4–2	(Australian Capital Territory) Canberra Lakers
Hyde 10'; Harris 14'; Andrews 48'; Lett 59'	Report	Day 18', 49'

Perth Hockey Stadium: Pitch 1
Umpires:
Matthew Claxton (AUS)
Aaron Gotting (AUS)

7 October 2017
14:00

SA Hotshots (South Australia)	1–2	(Northern Territory) NT Stingers
Willson 58'	Report	Hayward 2'; Wookey 5'

Perth Hockey Stadium: Pitch 1
Umpires:
Daniel Johnston (AUS)
Gurbaj Singh (AUS)

7 October 2017
18:00

Tassie Tigers (Tasmania)	1–2	(Western Australia) WA Thundersticks
Arthur 44'	Report	Mitton 20'; Flynn 32'

Perth Hockey Stadium: Pitch 1
Umpires:
James Unkles (AUS)
Ben Hocking (AUS)

==== First to fourth place classification ====
===== Pool C =====
Pos	Team	Pld	W	D	L	GF	GA	GD	Pts	Qualification
1	(Victoria (state)) VIC Vikings	3	2	1	0	12	8	+4	7	Final
2	(Queensland) QLD Blades	3	2	0	1	10	5	+5	6	Final
3	(New South Wales) NSW Waratahs	3	1	1	1	7	8	−1	4	
4	IND Development	3	0	0	3	2	10	−8	0	

Source: hockeyaustralia.altiusrt.com

5 October 2017
16:00

QLD Blades (Queensland)	4–2	(New South Wales) NSW Waratahs
Elder 2'; Rintala 8'; Anderson 42', 47'	Report	T. Craig 6'; K. Govers 30'

Perth Hockey Stadium: Pitch 1
Umpires:
Murray Grime (AUS)
Tim Pullman (AUS)

5 October 2017
18:00

VIC Vikings (Victoria (state))	5–2	IND Development
Webster 1'; Ciriello 18', 34', 49'; Kleinschmidt 32'	Report	Rohidas 40', 45'

Perth Hockey Stadium: Pitch 1
Umpires:
Ben de Young (AUS)
Stephen Rogers (AUS)

6 October 2017
16:00

QLD Blades (Queensland)	4–0	IND Development
M. Pembroke 5'; H. Pembroke 20'; Rintala 42'; Anderson 54'	Report

Perth Hockey Stadium: Pitch 1
Umpires:
Tim Pullman (AUS)
James Unkles (AUS)

6 October 2017
18:00

VIC Vikings (Victoria (state))	4–4	(New South Wales) NSW Waratahs
Ciriello 28', 31'; Hammond 35'; Gilmour 52'	Report	K. Govers 9'; Dawson 25'; Orchard 42'; B. Govers 45'

Perth Hockey Stadium: Pitch 1
Umpires:
Ben de Young (AUS)
Stephen Rogers (AUS)

===== Third and fourth place =====
8 October 2017
13:15

NSW Waratahs (New South Wales)	3–2	IND Development
T. Craig 39'; Orchard 55'; Sharp 56'	Report	Simranjeet 3'; Yousuf 9'

Perth Hockey Stadium: Pitch 1
Umpires:
Stephen Rogers (AUS)
Ben de Young (AUS)

===== Final =====
8 October 2017
17:45

VIC Vikings (Victoria (state))	1–1	(Queensland) QLD Blades
Ciriello 51'	Report	Beale 36'
Penalties
Webster (penalty shoot-out scored); Pollard (penalty shoot-out scored); Ford (penalty shoot-out missed); Kleinschmidt (penalty shoot-out scored)	3–0	(penalty shoot-out missed) Beale; (penalty shoot-out missed) Weyer; (penalty shoot-out missed) Wotherspoon

Perth Hockey Stadium: Pitch 1
Umpires:
Murray Grime (AUS)
Tim Pullman (AUS)

== Awards ==
Player of the Tournament	Topscorer(s)	Player of the Final	GK of the Tournament	Play the Whistle
(Queensland) Mark Knowles	(Tasmania) Kieron Arthur (Victoria (state)) Chris Ciriello	(Queensland) Robert Bell	(Victoria (state)) Johan Durst	(Queensland) QLD Blades

== Statistics ==
=== Final standings ===
Pos	Team	Pld	W	D	L	GF	GA	GD	Pts	Final Result
1st place, gold medalist(s)	(Victoria (state)) VIC Vikings	7	4	3	0	26	12	+14	15	Gold Medal
2nd place, silver medalist(s)	(Queensland) QLD Blades	7	5	1	1	30	11	+19	16	Silver Medal
3rd place, bronze medalist(s)	(New South Wales) NSW Waratahs	7	5	1	1	17	11	+6	16	Bronze Medal
4	IND Development	7	2	1	4	11	15	−4	7	
5	(Western Australia) WA Thundersticks	7	5	0	2	18	13	+5	15	
6	(Northern Territory) NT Stingers	7	4	1	2	13	12	+1	13	
7	(Tasmania) Tassie Tigers	7	3	1	3	20	13	+7	10	
8	(Australian Capital Territory) Canberra Lakers	7	1	0	6	11	19	−8	3	
9	NZL Development	7	1	0	6	12	28	−16	3	
10	(South Australia) SA Hotshots	7	1	0	6	10	34	−24	3	

Source: hockeyaustralia.altiusrt.com

=== Goalscorers ===
There were 168 goals scored in 35 matches, for an average of 4.8 goals per match.

9 goals

- (Tasmania) Kieron Arthur
- (Victoria (state)) Chris Ciriello

8 goals

- (Western Australia) Trent Mitton

7 goals

- (Queensland) Joel Rintala

5 goals

- (Queensland) Troy Elder
- (Tasmania) Sam McCambridge
- (Victoria (state)) Aaron Kleinschmidt
- (Western Australia) Liam Flynn

4 goals

- (New South Wales) Tom Craig
- (New South Wales) Blake Govers
- (Northern Territory) Isaac Farmilo
- (Northern Territory) Jeremy Hayward
- (Queensland) Jacob Anderson
- (Queensland) Daniel Beale
- (South Australia) Kurtis Willson
- (Western Australia) Tom Wickham

3 goals

- (Australian Capital Territory) Troy Sutherland
- (India) Amit Rohidas
- (India) Affan Yousuf
- (New South Wales) Kieran Govers
- (New Zealand) Reuben Andrews
- (New Zealand) Dylan Thomas
- (Victoria (state)) Kiran Arunasalam
- (Victoria (state)) Russell Ford

2 goals

- (Australian Capital Territory) James Day
- (Australian Capital Territory) Benjamin Staines
- (Australian Capital Territory) Glenn Turner
- (India) Armaan Qureshi
- (New South Wales) Simon Orchard
- (New South Wales) Lachlan Sharp
- (New Zealand) Cam Hyde
- (New Zealand) Dane Lett
- (Northern Territory) Oscar Wookey
- (Queensland) Robert Bell
- (Queensland) Scott Boyde
- (Queensland) Corey Weyer
- (South Australia) Daniel Mitchell

1 goal

- (Australian Capital Territory) Niranjan Gupte
- (Australian Capital Territory) Jake Staines
- (India) Simranjeet Singh
- (India) Talwinder Singh
- (India) Mohammad Umar
- (New South Wales) Matthew Dawson
- (New South Wales) Nic McEwen
- (New Zealand) Joe Hanks
- (New Zealand) Daniel Harris
- (Northern Territory) Robert Duguid
- (Northern Territory) Adrian Lockley
- (Northern Territory) Jared Taylor
- (Queensland) Hugh Pembroke
- (Queensland) Matthew Pembroke
- (Queensland) Matthew Swann
- (Queensland) Dylan Wotherspoon
- (South Australia) Fraser Bowden
- (South Australia) Simon Brown
- (South Australia) Harry Johns
- (South Australia) Luke Larwood
- (Tasmania) Jeremy Edwards
- (Tasmania) Kurt Mackey
- (Tasmania) Ian McHugh
- (Tasmania) Eddie Ockenden
- (Tasmania) Jack Welch
- (Victoria (state)) Will Gilmour
- (Victoria (state)) Casey Hammond
- (Victoria (state)) Max Hendry
- (Victoria (state)) Josh Pollard
- (Victoria (state)) Andrew Scanlon
- (Victoria (state)) James Webster
- (Western Australia) Frank Main

Source: Hockey Australia
