= 2016 Men's Australian Hockey League =

Australian field hockey tournament

Tournament details
- Host country: Australia
- City: Perth
- Teams: 12
- Venue: Perth Hockey Stadium

Final positions
- Champions: (Victoria (state)) VIC Vikings (3rd title)
- Runner-up: (Western Australia) WA Thundersticks
- Third place: (New South Wales) NSW Waratahs

Tournament statistics
- Matches played: 42
- Goals scored: 216 (5.14 per match)
- Top scorer: (Victoria (state)) Chris Ciriello (10 goals)
- Best player: (New South Wales) Flynn Ogilvie

The 2016 Men's Australian Hockey League was the 26th edition of the Australian Hockey League men's Field Hockey tournament. The tournament was held in the Western Australia city of Perth.

For the first time, the Australian Hockey League hosted international teams from India, Malaysia and New Zealand.

The VIC Vikings won the gold medal for the third time by defeating the WA Thundersticks 5–3 in the final. The NSW Waratahs won the bronze medal after defeating the India Under–21 side 5–1 in the third place match.

== Teams ==
Domestic Teams

- (Australian Capital Territory) Canberra Lakers
- (New South Wales) NSW Waratahs
- (Northern Territory) NT Stingers
- (Queensland) QLD Blades
- (South Australia) SA Hotshots
- (Tasmania) Tassie Tigers
- (Victoria (state)) VIC Vikings
- (Western Australia) WA Thundersticks

International Teams

- India Under–21
- Malaysia Blue
- Malaysia Tigers
- NZL Development

== Results ==
=== First round ===
==== Pool A ====
Pos	Team	Pld	W	D	L	GF	GA	GD	Pts	Qualification
1	(New South Wales) NSW Waratahs	5	5	0	0	21	7	+14	15	Advance to Medal Round
2	(Victoria (state)) VIC Vikings	5	4	0	1	22	9	+13	12	Advance to Medal Round
3	(Queensland) QLD Blades	5	3	0	2	25	11	+14	9	
4	Malaysia Tigers	5	1	1	3	9	16	−7	4	
5	(Northern Territory) NT Stingers	5	1	0	4	13	16	−3	3	
6	NZL Development	5	0	1	4	5	36	−31	1	

Source: Hockey Australia

29 September 2016
16:30

NT Stingers (Northern Territory)	1–5	(Victoria (state)) VIC Vikings
Rintala 28'	Report	Ciriello 11', 44'; Simmonds 12'; Simpson 32'; Kleinschmidt 43'

Umpires:
Zeke Newman (AUS)
Muhammad Rais Bin Zakaria (MAS)

29 September 2016
18:00

Malaysia Tigers	1–1	NZL Development
Meor 35'	Report	Jones 45'

Umpires:
Adam Barry (AUS)
Glen Munday (AUS)

29 September 2016
18:30

QLD Blades (Queensland)	1–3	(New South Wales) NSW Waratahs
Bell 35'	Report	Hill 29'; T. Craig 33'; McGuire 48'

Umpires:
Daniel Johnston (AUS)
Jeremy Coleman (AUS)

30 September 2016
16:00

NZL Development	0–8	(Northern Territory) NT Stingers
	Report	Argent 9', 21'; Rintala 12', 49'; J. Hayward 23'; Hall 41'; Gleeson 43'; Crane 48'

Umpires:
Matthew Claxton (AUS)
Stephen Versteegh (AUS)

30 September 2016
16:30

QLD Blades (Queensland)	5–2	Malaysia Tigers
Elder 5'; Boyde 20', 29'; Bell 20'; Imer 44'	Report	Shahril 47'; Ramadan 57'

Umpires:
Scott Embry (AUS)
Zeke Newman (AUS)

30 September 2016
20:00

VIC Vikings (Victoria (state))	1–2	(New South Wales) NSW Waratahs
Simmonds 50'	Report	Morley 7'; Orchard 35'

Umpires:
Stirling Sharpe (AUS)
Daniel Johnston (AUS)

2 October 2016
15:00

QLD Blades (Queensland)	3–4	(Victoria (state)) VIC Vikings
Douglas 20', 51'; Pembroke 37'	Report	Knee 5'; Ciriello 6'; Ford 28'; Kleinschmidt 49'

Umpires:
Matthew Claxton (AUS)
Andrew Spence (NZL)

2 October 2016
17:00

NSW Waratahs (New South Wales)	7–2	NZL Development
Hill 5'; Ogilvie 8'; T. Craig 10'; Sharp 33'; Dawson 38', 46'; McGuire 54'	Report	Van Woerkom 7', 59'

Umpires:
Scott Embry (AUS)
Stirling Sharpe (AUS)

2 October 2016
19:00

NT Stingers (Northern Territory)	1–3	Malaysia Tigers
Lockley 15'	Report	Shahril 7'; Firhan 28'; Haziq 37'

Umpires:
Daniel Johnston (AUS)
Adam Barry (AUS)

4 October 2016
15:00

NZL Development	2–8	(Victoria (state)) VIC Vikings
MacIntrye 7'; Jones 20'	Report	Kleinschmidt 13'; Pollard 19', 25'; Gilmour 29'; Ford 32'; Ciriello 34', 56'; Simmonds 58'

Umpires:
Muhammad Rais Bin Zakaria (MAS)
Daniel Johnston (AUS)

4 October 2016
17:00

Malaysia Tigers	2–5	(New South Wales) NSW Waratahs
Shahril 16'; Van Huizen 47'	Report	Morley 2', 24'; Ogilvie 6'; McGuire 15'; Hill 45'

Umpires:
Glen Munday (AUS)
Stirling Sharpe (AUS)

4 October 2016
19:00

NT Stingers (Northern Territory)	2–4	(Queensland) QLD Blades
Lockley 47'; Wallis 55'	Report	Bell 2'; Whetton 16'; Douglas 45'; Anderson 53'

Umpires:
James Unkles (AUS)
Matthew Claxton (AUS)

5 October 2016
16:30

NSW Waratahs (New South Wales)	4–1	(Northern Territory) NT Stingers
B. Craig 4'; T. Craig 15', 57'; Hill 21'	Report	J. Hayward 43'

Umpires:
Stephen Rogers (AUS)
Adam Barry (AUS)

5 October 2016
18:00

VIC Vikings (Victoria (state))	4–1	Malaysia Tigers
Pollard 20'; Ciriello 26'; Kleinschmidt 30'; Ford 34'	Report	Jazlan 50'

Umpires:
Stephen Versteegh (AUS)
Zeke Newman (AUS)

5 October 2016
20:30

NZL Development	0–12	(Queensland) QLD Blades
	Report	Beale 5', 43'; Elder 5', 15', 45'; Anderson 17'; Howard 19'; Whetton 26', 53'; Bell 39'; Reckers 54'; Boyde 57'

Umpires:
Stirling Sharpe (AUS)
Muhammad Rais Bin Zakaria (MAS)

==== Pool B ====
Pos	Team	Pld	W	D	L	GF	GA	GD	Pts	Qualification
1	India Under–21	5	4	1	0	14	7	+7	13	Advance to Medal Round
2	(Western Australia) WA Thundersticks	5	4	0	1	11	4	+7	12	Advance to Medal Round
3	(Australian Capital Territory) Canberra Lakers	5	2	1	2	13	10	+3	7	
4	(Tasmania) Tassie Tigers	5	2	1	2	9	6	+3	7	
5	(South Australia) SA Hotshots	5	1	0	4	7	17	−10	3	
6	MAS Blue	5	0	1	4	4	14	−10	1	

Source: Hockey Australia

29 September 2016
16:00

MAS Blue	2–4	India Under–21
Faizal 4', 55'	Report	Qureshi 19', 42'; Varun 21'; Gurjant 32'

Umpires:
Stephen Rogers (AUS)
James Unkles (AUS)

29 September 2016
20:00

SA Hotshots (South Australia)	0–4	(Tasmania) Tassie Tigers
	Report	Arthur 32', 42', 60'; Ockenden 35'

Umpires:
Andrew Spence (NZL)
Scott Embry (AUS)

29 September 2016
20:30

WA Thundersticks (Western Australia)	4–1	(Australian Capital Territory) Canberra Lakers
Rayner 26'; McDougall 36'; Bird 42'; Wickham 56'	Report	Monte 56'

Umpires:
Stephen Versteegh (AUS)
Matthew Claxton (AUS)

30 September 2016
18:00

India Under–21	3–1	(South Australia) SA Hotshots
Gurjant 4'; Ajit 14'; Parvinder 20'	Report	Atkinson 45'

Umpires:
Jeremy Coleman (AUS)
Muhammad Rais Bin Zakaria (MAS)

30 September 2016
18:30

WA Thundersticks (Western Australia)	2–0	MAS Blue
Wickham 15'; Budgeon 34'	Report

Umpires:
James Unkles (AUS)
Andrew Spence (NZL)

30 September 2016
20:30

Tassie Tigers (Tasmania)	2–1	(Australian Capital Territory) Canberra Lakers
McCambridge 33'; Welch 57'	Report	J. Staines 57'

Umpires:
Stephen Rogers (AUS)
Glen Munday (AUS)

2 October 2016
15:30

WA Thundersticks (Western Australia)	1–0	(Tasmania) Tassie Tigers
Budgeon 40'	Report

Umpires:
James Unkles (AUS)
Zeke Newman (AUS)

2 October 2016
17:30

Canberra Lakers (Australian Capital Territory)	1–1	India Under–21
S. Shepherd 17'	Report	Ajit 15'

Umpires:
Jeremy Coleman (AUS)
Muhammad Rais Bin Zakaria (MAS)

2 October 2016
19:30

SA Hotshots (South Australia)	4–0	MAS Blue
Atkinson 22'; Willson 29'; Bowden 45'; Burgess 56'	Report

Umpires:
Glen Munday (AUS)
Stephen Versteegh (AUS)

3 October 2016
15:00

India Under–21	3–2	(Tasmania) Tassie Tigers
Qureshi 10', 54'; Varun 13'	Report	Dick 12'; Shaw 50'

Umpires:
Zeke Newman (AUS)
Adam Barry (AUS)

3 October 2016
17:00

Malaysia Blue	1–3	(Australian Capital Territory) Canberra Lakers
Rafizul 29'	Report	L. Shepherd 24'; Day 50'; Wallace 54'

Umpires:
Scott Embry (AUS)
Stephen Versteegh (AUS)

3 October 2016
19:30

SA Hotshots (South Australia)	0–3	(Western Australia) WA Thundersticks
	Report	Mitton 33'; Bausor 57', 60'

Umpires:
Stephen Rogers (AUS)
Jeremy Coleman (AUS)

5 October 2016
16:00

Canberra Lakers (Australian Capital Territory)	7–2	(South Australia) SA Hotshots
Monte 1', 12', 56'; S. Shepherd 9'; Day 41'; L. Shepherd 48'; J. Staines 58'	Report	Oliver 1'; Cox 25'

Umpires:
Andrew Spence (NZL)
Jeremy Coleman (AUS)

5 October 2016
18:30

India Under–21	3–1	(Western Australia) WA Thundersticks
Sumit 32'; Varun 39', 40'	Report	Bausor 16'

Umpires:
Matthew Claxton (AUS)
Glen Munday (AUS)

5 October 2016
20:00

Tassie Tigers (Tasmania)	1–1	Malaysia Blue
Ockenden 23'	Report	Faizal 43'

Umpires:
Scott Embry (AUS)
Daniel Johnston (AUS)

=== Classification ===
==== Ninth to twelfth place classification ====
Crossover
7 October 2016
(South Australia) SA Hotshots	2
(New Zealand) NZL Futures	2
7 October 2016
(Northern Territory) NT Stingers	5
Malaysia Blue	1

Ninth and Tenth Place
8 October 2016
(South Australia) SA Hotshots	1
(Northern Territory) NT Stingers	5
Eleventh and Twelfth Place
8 October 2016
(New Zealand) NZL Futures	0
Malaysia Blue	3

===== Crossover =====
7 October 2016
08:30

SA Hotshots (South Australia)	2–2	NZL Development
Atkinson 29', 30'	Report	MacIntrye 11'; Radovonich 46'

Umpires:
Stirling Sharpe (AUS)
Muhammad Rais Bin Zakaria (MAS)

7 October 2016
10:30

NT Stingers (Northern Territory)	5–1	Malaysia Blue
Argent 4', 10', 31'; Reardon 19'; J. Hayward 22'	Report	Amirol 43'

Umpires:
Andrew Spence (NZL)
Glen Munday (AUS)

===== Eleventh and twelfth place =====
8 October 2016
08:00

NZL Development	0–3	Malaysia Blue
	Report	Hafiz 7'; Faizal 34', 52'

Umpires:
Stirling Sharpe (AUS)
Jeremy Coleman (AUS)

===== Ninth and tenth place =====
8 October 2016
12:00

SA Hotshots (South Australia)	1–5	(Northern Territory) NT Stingers
Willson 11'	Report	Wallis 38'; Rasmussen 51', 56', 60'; J. Hayward 58'

Umpires:
Andrew Spence (NZL)
Scott Embry (AUS)

==== Fifth to eighth place classification ====
Crossover
7 October 2016
(Australian Capital Territory) Canberra Lakers	0
Malaysia Tigers	3
7 October 2016
(Queensland) QLD Blades	5
(Tasmania) Tassie Tigers	3

Fifth and Sixth Place
8 October 2016
Malaysia Tigers	2
(Queensland) QLD Blades	4
Seventh and Eighth Place
8 October 2016
(Australian Capital Territory) Canberra Lakers	1
(Tasmania) Tassie Tigers	4

===== Crossover =====
7 October 2016
12:30

Canberra Lakers (Australian Capital Territory)	0–3	Malaysia Tigers
	Report	Shahril 5'; Haziq 7'; Ramadan 49'

Umpires:
Stephen Versteegh (AUS)
Adam Barry (AUS)

7 October 2016
12:30

QLD Blades (Queensland)	5–3	(Tasmania) Tassie Tigers
Beale 2', 23', 31'; Whetton 30'; Anderson 50'	Report	Ockenden 24'; Arthur 39', 41'

Umpires:
Jeremy Coleman (AUS)
Daniel Johnston (AUS)

===== Seventh and eighth place =====
8 October 2016
16:00

Canberra Lakers (Australian Capital Territory)	1–4	(Tasmania) Tassie Tigers
Monte 43'	Report	Welch 12'; Ockenden 17'; Read 35'; Boulton 38'

Umpires:
Matthew Claxton (AUS)
Adam Barry (AUS)

===== Fifth and sixth place =====
8 October 2016
20:00

Malaysia Tigers	2–4	(Queensland) QLD Blades
Shahril 34'; Najmi 35'	Report	Boyde 8'; Beale 38'; Bell 41', 46'

Umpires:
Stephen Versteegh (AUS)
James Unkles (AUS)

==== Medal round ====
Semi-Finals
7 October 2016
India Under–21	3 (3)
(Victoria (state)) VIC Vikings (p.s.o)	3 (4)
7 October 2016
(New South Wales) NSW Waratahs	1 (1)
(Western Australia) WA Thundersticks (p.s.o)	1 (3)

Gold Medal Match
9 October 2016
(Victoria (state)) VIC Vikings	5
(Western Australia) WA Thundersticks	3
Bronze Medal Match
9 October 2016
India Under–21	1
(New South Wales) NSW Waratahs	5

===== Semi-finals =====
7 October 2016
18:00

India Under–21	3–3	(Victoria (state)) VIC Vikings
Varun 38', 54', 56'	Report	Ciriello 20', 28'; Kleinschmidt 22'
Penalties
Manpreet (penalty shoot-out scored); Parvinder (penalty shoot-out missed); Gurjant (penalty shoot-out scored); Parvinder (penalty shoot-out scored); Santa (penalty shoot-out missed)	3–4	(penalty shoot-out scored) Webster; (penalty shoot-out scored) Kleinschmidt; (penalty shoot-out missed) Gilmour; (penalty shoot-out scored) Ford; (penalty shoot-out scored) Ciriello

Umpires:
Stephen Rogers (AUS)
Zeke Newman (AUS)

7 October 2016
20:00

NSW Waratahs (New South Wales)	1–1	(Western Australia) WA Thundersticks
Noblett 58'	Report	Bausor 52'
Penalties
Ogilvie (penalty shoot-out missed); Hayes (penalty shoot-out scored); Willis (penalty shoot-out missed); Sharp (penalty shoot-out missed)	1–3	(penalty shoot-out scored) Zalewski; (penalty shoot-out scored) Mitton; (penalty shoot-out scored) Bird

Umpires:
Matthew Claxton (AUS)
James Unkles (AUS)

===== Third and fourth place =====
9 October 2016
10:00

India Under–21	1–5	(New South Wales) NSW Waratahs
Gurjant 25'	Report	Sharp 6'; T. Craig 16', 59'; Morley 23', 44'

Umpires:
Daniel Johnston (AUS)
Glen Munday (AUS)

===== Final =====
9 October 2016
16:00

VIC Vikings (Victoria (state))	5–3	(Western Australia) WA Thundersticks
Ciriello 6', 15'; Knee 25'; Arunasalam 34'; Philpott 54'	Report	Geers 7'; Bausor 13', 53'

Umpires:
Stephen Rogers (AUS)
Zeke Newman (AUS)

== Awards ==
Player of the Tournament	Topscorer	Player of the Final	GK of the Tournament	Play the Whistle
(New South Wales) Flynn Ogilvie	(Victoria (state)) Chris Ciriello	(Victoria (state)) Chris Ciriello	(Western Australia) Tyler Lovell	(Western Australia) WA Thundersticks

== Statistics ==
=== Final standings ===
Pos	Team	Pld	W	D	L	GF	GA	GD	Pts	Final Result
1st place, gold medalist(s)	(Victoria (state)) VIC Vikings	7	5	1	1	30	15	+15	16	Gold Medal
2nd place, silver medalist(s)	(Western Australia) WA Thundersticks	7	4	1	2	15	10	+5	13	Silver Medal
3rd place, bronze medalist(s)	(New South Wales) NSW Waratahs	7	6	1	0	27	9	+18	19	Bronze Medal
4	India Under–21	7	4	2	1	18	15	+3	14	
5	(Queensland) QLD Blades	7	5	0	2	34	16	+18	15	
6	Malaysia Tigers	7	2	1	4	14	20	−6	7	
7	(Tasmania) Tassie Tigers	7	3	1	3	16	12	+4	10	
8	(Australian Capital Territory) Canberra Lakers	7	2	1	4	14	17	−3	7	
9	(Northern Territory) NT Stingers	7	3	0	4	23	18	+5	9	
10	(South Australia) SA Hotshots	7	1	1	5	10	24	−14	4	
11	Malaysia Blue	7	1	1	5	8	19	−11	4	
12	NZL Development	7	0	2	5	7	41	−34	2	

Source: Hockey Australia

=== Goalscorers ===
There were 216 goals scored in 42 matches, for an average of 5.14 goals per match.

10 goals

- (Victoria (state)) Chris Ciriello

7 goals

- (India) Varun Kumar

6 goals

- (New South Wales) Tom Craig
- (Queensland) Daniel Beale
- (Queensland) Robert Bell
- (Western Australia) Chris Bausor

5 goals

- (Australian Capital Territory) Andrew Monte
- (Malaysia) Shahril Saabah (Tigers)
- (Malaysia) Faizal Saari (Blue)
- (New South Wales) Landon Morley
- (Northern Territory) Matthew Argent
- (Tasmania) Kieron Arthur
- (Victoria (state)) Aaron Kleinschmidt

4 goals

- (India) Armaan Qureshi
- (New South Wales) Nick Hill
- (Northern Territory) Jeremy Hayward
- (Queensland) Scott Boyde
- (Queensland) Troy Elder
- (Queensland) Jacob Whetton
- (South Australia) Martin Atkinson
- (Tasmania) Eddie Ockenden

3 goals

- (India) Gurjant Singh
- (New South Wales) Robert McGuire
- (Northern Territory) Alec Rasmussen
- (Northern Territory) Joel Rintala
- (Queensland) Jacob Anderson
- (Queensland) Justin Douglas
- (Victoria (state)) Russell Ford
- (Victoria (state)) Joshua Pollard
- (Victoria (state)) Joshua Simmonds

2 goals

- (Australian Capital Territory) James Day
- (Australian Capital Territory) Lewis Shepherd
- (Australian Capital Territory) Stuart Shepherd
- (Australian Capital Territory) Jake Staines
- (India) Ajit Pandey
- (Malaysia) Najmi Jazlan (Tigers)
- (Malaysia) Haziq Samsul (Tigers)
- (Malaysia) Ramadan Rosli (Tigers)
- (New South Wales) Matthew Dawson
- (New South Wales) Flynn Ogilvie
- (New South Wales) Lachlan Sharp
- (New Zealand) Jared Jones
- (New Zealand) Oliver MacIntrye
- (New Zealand) Benedict van Woerkom
- (Northern Territory) Adrian Lockley
- (Northern Territory) Blake Wallis
- (South Australia) Kurtis Willson
- (Tasmania) Jack Welch
- (Victoria (state)) James Knee
- (Western Australia) Nicholas Budgeon
- (Western Australia) Tom Wickham

1 goal

- (Australian Capital Territory) Jack Wallace
- (India) Parvinder Singh
- (India) Sumit
- (Malaysia) Amirol Aideed (Blue)
- (Malaysia) Firhan Ashari (Tigers)
- (Malaysia) Mustafa Rafizul Ezry (Blue)
- (Malaysia) Meor Azuan Hassan (Tigers)
- (Malaysia) Zaidi Hafiz Huddin (Blue)
- (Malaysia) Joel van Huizen (Tigers)
- (New South Wales) Ben Craig
- (New South Wales) Luke Noblett
- (New South Wales) Simon Orchard
- (New Zealand) Ben Radovonich
- (Northern Territory) Oliver Crane
- (Northern Territory) Brodie Gleeson
- (Northern Territory) Ross Hall
- (Northern Territory) Joe Reardon
- (Queensland) Tim Howard
- (Queensland) Adam Imer
- (Queensland) Hugh Pembroke
- (Queensland) Rob Reckers
- (South Australia) Fraser Bowden
- (South Australia) Sean Burgess
- (South Australia) Daniel Cox
- (South Australia) Alistair Oliver
- (Tasmania) Angus Boulton
- (Tasmania) James Dick
- (Tasmania) Sam McCambridge
- (Tasmania) Ben Read
- (Tasmania) William Shaw
- (Victoria (state)) Kiran Arunasalam
- (Victoria (state)) Will Gilmour
- (Victoria (state)) Andrew Philpott
- (Victoria (state)) Glenn Simpson
- (Western Australia) Matthew Bird
- (Western Australia) Tim Geers
- (Western Australia) Trent Mitton
- (Western Australia) Daniel Rayner
- (Western Australia) Justin McDougall

Source: Hockey Australia
