= 2019 Men's Hockey One =

Men's edition Of Australian Hockey

2019 Men's Sultana Bran Hockey One
Tournament details
- Host country: Australia
- Dates: 29 September – 16 November
- Teams: 7
- Venue: 7 (in 7 host cities)

Final positions
- Champions: (New South Wales) NSW Pride (1st title)
- Runner-up: (Queensland) Brisbane Blaze
- Third place: (Tasmania) Tassie Tigers

Tournament statistics
- Matches played: 24
- Goals scored: 184 (7.67 per match)
- Top scorer: (New South Wales) Blake Govers (12 goals)
- Best player: (Tasmania) Eddie Ockenden

The 2019 Men's Sultana Bran Hockey One was the inaugural men's edition of Hockey Australia's national league, Hockey One. The tournament was held across 7 states and territories of Australia. The tournament started on 29 September and culminated on 16 November 2019.

The grand final of the tournament was hosted by HC Melbourne, as the top ranked team to qualify for the final in the women's league.

NSW Pride won the tournament after defeating Brisbane Blaze 8–3 in the final. Tassie Tigers finished in bronze position, following results from the pool stage.

== Competition format ==
=== Format ===
The 2019 Hockey One will follow a similar format to that of the final edition of the Australian Hockey League. Teams will play a series of home and away matches during the Pool Stage, which will be followed by a Classification Round.

During the pool stage, teams play each other once in either a home or a way fixture. The top four ranked teams will then qualify for the Classification Round, playing in two semi-finals with the winners contesting a grand final. Team 1 will host Team 4, while Team 2 will host Team 3. Of the two victorious teams, the higher ranked team from the pool stage will host the grand final.

=== Rules ===
In addition to FIH sanctioned rules, Hockey Australia is implementing the following rules for Hockey One:

- When a field goal or penalty stroke is scored the same athlete will have an automatic one-on-one shootout with the goalkeeper for an extra goal.
- Outright winner: There will be no drawn games. In the event of a draw, teams will contest a penalty shoot-out to determine a winner.

=== Point Allocation ===
Match points will be distributed as follows:

- 5 points: win
- 3 points: shoot-out win
- 2 points: shoot-out loss
- 0 points: loss

== Participating teams ==
The seven teams competing in the league come from Australia's states and territories, with the Northern Territory being the only team absent.

(South Australia) Adelaide Fire

Head Coach: Mark Victory

3. Lachlan Busiko (C)
6. Angus Fry
7. Scott Germein
9. Fred Gray
11. Cameron Joyce
13. Luke Larwood
15. Andrew Leat
16. Daniel Mitchell
18. Alastair Oliver
19. Glyn Tamlin
20. Isaac Farmilo
21. Simon Wells
22. Chris Wells
23. Cameron White
24. Hirotaka Zendana
25. Kota Watanabe
26. Liam Alexander
27. Ross Hetem
28. Ben Hooppell
29. Edward Chittleborough (GK)
(Queensland) Brisbane Blaze

Head Coach: Matt Wells

2. Shane Kenny
3. Corey Weyer
4. Hugh Pembroke
5. Scott Boyde
7. Joel Rintala
9. Jacob Anderson (C)
10. Robert Bell
11. Matthew Pembroke
12. Jacob Whetton
13. Ethan White
14. Luke Tyne
15. Justin Douglas
16. Tim Howard
19. Blake Wotherspoon
20. Matthew Swann
23. Daniel Beale
26. Dylan Wotherspoon
27. Jared Taylor
31. Matthew Finn (GK)
32. Mitchell Nicholson (GK)
(Australian Capital Territory) Canberra Chill

Head Coach: Peter Morgan

1. Aaron Knight
2. Ben Staines
3. Anand Gupte
4. James Day
5. Lewis Shepherd
7. Kazuma Murata
8. Daniel Conroy
9. Jamie Hawke
10. Owen Chivers
11. Garry Backhus
12. Jake Staines
13. Manabu Yamashita
15. Josh Chivers
17. Aaron Kershaw (C)
20. Lewis McLennan
22. Jay MacDonald
26. James Jewell
27. Kentaro Fukuda
30. Andrew Charter (GK)
32. Brendan Hill (GK)
(Victoria (state)) HC Melbourne

Head Coach: Lachlan Anderson

1. Craig Marais
2. Max Hendry
3. Simon Borger
5. Andrew Philpott
7. Will Gilmour
8. Joshua Pollard
9. Nathan Ephraums
10. Russell Ford (C)
11. George Bazeley (GK)
12. Casey Hammond
13. Jayshaan Randhawa
14. Jonathan Bretherton
15. Joshua Simmonds
17. Kiran Arunasalam
18. Johan Durst (GK)
21. Jake Sherren
23. Joel Carroll
24. James Knee
25. Aaron Kleinschmidt
29. Oscar Wookey
(New South Wales) NSW Pride

Head Coach: Brent Livermore

1. Lachlan Sharp
2. Tom Craig (C)
3. BJ Bruton (GK)
4. Lain Carr
5. Ash Thomas (GK)
6. Matthew Dawson
7. Daine Richards
8. Nathanael Stewart
11. Hayden Dillon
12. Kurt Lovett
13. Blake Govers
18. Tristan White
19. Jack Hayes
20. Ky Willott
22. Flynn Ogilvie
23. Ryan Proctor
24. Dylan Martin
26. Ehren Hazell
28. Sam Gray
29. Timothy Brand
(Western Australia) Perth Thundersticks

Head Coach: Alistair Park

1. Brayden King
3. Tim Geers
4. Jake Harvie
5. Frazer Gerrard
6. James Collins
7. Tyler Lovell (GK)
8. Coby Green
9. Dane Gavranich
10. Tom Wickham
13. Daniel Rayney
14. Liam Flynn
15. Will Byas
17. Aran Zalewski (C)
18. Ben Rennie (GK)
19. Daniel Robertson
23. Matthew Fisher
24. Alec Rasmussen
25. Trent Mitton
26. Brandon Gibbs
27. Marshall Roberts
(Tasmania) Tassie Tigers

Head Coach: Andrew McDonald

2. Nick Leslie
3. Kurt Budgeon
4. Hayden Beltz
6. Joshua Brooks
7. Joshua Mardell
10. Linden McCarthy
11. Eddie Ockenden (C)
12. Samuel McCulloch
13. Joshua Beltz
14. Jack Welch
15. Kieron Arthur
18. Grant Woodcock (GK)
19. Tim Deavin
20. James Bourke
21. Ben Read
23. Henry Chambers (GK)
26. Oliver Smith
27. Gobindraj Gill
29. Sam McCambridge
32. Jeremy Hayward

== Venues ==
Sydney	Melbourne	Perth
Sydney Olympic Park	State Netball and Hockey Centre	Perth Hockey Stadium
Capacity: 8,000	Capacity: 8,000	Capacity: 6,000
Adelaide	2019 Men's Hockey One is located in Australia	
State Hockey Centre	2019 Men's Hockey One is located in Australia	
Capacity: 4,000	2019 Men's Hockey One is located in Australia	
Brisbane	2019 Men's Hockey One is located in Australia	
Queensland State Hockey Centre	2019 Men's Hockey One is located in Australia	
Capacity: 1,000	2019 Men's Hockey One is located in Australia	
Canberra	2019 Men's Hockey One is located in Australia	
National Hockey Centre	2019 Men's Hockey One is located in Australia	
Hobart	2019 Men's Hockey One is located in Australia	
Tasmanian Hockey Centre	2019 Men's Hockey One is located in Australia	

== Results ==
=== Pool stage ===
Pos	Team	Pld	W	WD	LD	L	GF	GA	GD	Pts	Qualification
1	(New South Wales) NSW Pride	6	6	0	0	0	32	5	+27	30	Semi-finals
2	(Queensland) Brisbane Blaze	6	5	0	0	1	25	10	+15	25	Semi-finals
3	(Tasmania) Tassie Tigers	6	4	0	0	2	23	19	+4	20	Semi-finals
4	(Victoria (state)) HC Melbourne	6	3	0	0	3	29	30	−1	15	Semi-finals
5	(Australian Capital Territory) Canberra Chill	6	1	1	0	4	17	34	−17	8	
6	(Western Australia) Perth Thundersticks	6	1	0	1	4	15	29	−14	7	
7	(South Australia) Adelaide Fire	6	0	0	0	6	16	30	−14	0	

Source: Hockey Australia
Rules for classification: 1) points; 2) matches won; 3) goal difference; 4) goals for; 5) head-to-head result; 6) field goals scored.

==== Matches ====
29 September 2019
14:30 (AEST)

NSW Pride (New South Wales)	2–1	(South Australia) Adelaide Fire
Hazell 42'; Govers 45+'	Report	Busiko 47'

Sydney Olympic Park, Sydney
Umpires:
Zeke Newman (AUS)
Stephen Versteegh (AUS)

29 September 2019
15:00 (AWST)

Perth Thundersticks (Western Australia)	4–5	(Victoria (state)) HC Melbourne
Wickham 7', 7'; Mitton 20', 20'	Report	Ephraums 7', 8'; Ford 11', 12', 32'

Perth Hockey Stadium, Perth
Umpires:
Matthew Claxton (AUS)
Daniel Johnston (AUS)

29 September 2019
15:30 (AEST)

Canberra Chill (Australian Capital Territory)	1–4	(Queensland) Brisbane Blaze
Kershaw 21'	Report	Rintala 21'; Douglas 41', 21'; Anderson 52'

National Hockey Centre, Canberra
Umpires:
Stirling Sharpe (AUS)
David Bridgford (AUS)

5 October 2019
15:30 (AEST)

Canberra Chill (Australian Capital Territory)	0–7	(New South Wales) NSW Pride
	Report	Craig 30'; Govers 42', 58'; Lovett 51', 51'; Brand 56', 56'

National Hockey Centre, Canberra
Umpires:
Stirling Sharpe (AUS)
David Bridgford (AUS)

5 October 2019
18:30 (AEST)

Tassie Tigers (Tasmania)	5–1	(South Australia) Adelaide Fire
Leslie 10', 10'; McCambridge 24'; Hayward 28'; H. Beltz 43'	Report	Zendana 57'

Tasmanian Hockey Centre, Hobart
Umpires:
Jayden Pearson (AUS)
Tim Pullman (AUS)

6 October 2019
14:45 (AEDT)

HC Melbourne (Victoria (state))	2–4	(Queensland) Brisbane Blaze
Simmonds 4', 43'	Report	Whetton 14', 14'; Boyde 47'; Taylor 49'

State Netball and Hockey Centre, Melbourne
Umpires:
James Unkles (AUS)
Ben Hocking (AUS)

12 October 2019
13:00 (AEDT)

NSW Pride (New South Wales)	4–2	(Tasmania) Tassie Tigers
Govers 5', 25', 29', 33'	Report	McCambridge 9'; Ockenden 13'

Sydney Olympic Park, Sydney
Umpires:
Zeke Newman (AUS)
Stephen Versteegh (AUS)

12 October 2019
14:00 (AWST)

Perth Thundersticks (Western Australia)	3–3	(Australian Capital Territory) Canberra Chill
Geers 14'; King 22'; Wickham 57'	Report	J. Staines 27', 27'; B. Staines 58'
Penalties
Zalewski (penalty shoot-out missed); Wickham (penalty shoot-out missed); Mitton (penalty shoot-out scored); Green (penalty shoot-out missed)	1–3	(penalty shoot-out scored) Murata; (penalty shoot-out scored) Day; (penalty shoot-out scored) Backhus; (penalty shoot-out missed) J. Staines

Perth Hockey Stadium, Perth
Umpires:
Peter Wright (RSA)
Daniel Johnston (AUS)

13 October 2019
14:30 (ACDT)

Adelaide Fire (South Australia)	1–5	(Queensland) Brisbane Blaze
Farmilo 29'	Report	Weyer 5'; Rintala 10', 30+', 45', 58'

State Hockey Centre, Adelaide
Umpires:
Tim Pullman (AUS)
Nathan Jennings (AUS)

18 October 2019
19:30 (AEST)

Brisbane Blaze (Queensland)	7–0	(Tasmania) Tassie Tigers
Beale 1'; Rintala 17'; Weyer 25'; D. Wotherspoon 36', 36', 38', 38'	Report

Queensland State Hockey Centre, Brisbane
Umpires:
Adam Kearns (AUS)
Ben de Young (AUS)

18 October 2019
20:30 (ACDT)

Adelaide Fire (South Australia)	4–6	(Western Australia) Perth Thundersticks
Watanabe 20', 20', 60', 60'	Report	Mitton 28', 28'; Robertson 42', 42'; Rasmussen 43'; Wickham 49'

State Hockey Centre, Adelaide
Umpires:
Tim Pullman (AUS)
Nathan Jennings (AUS)

18 October 2019
20:45 (AEDT)

HC Melbourne (Victoria (state))	10–5	(Australian Capital Territory) Canberra Chill
Arunasalam 14', 30', 30', 41'; Kleinschmidt 14'; Marais 15'; Gilmour 25', 25', 37', 37'	Report	Backhus 2', 54', 54'; Conroy 49', 49'

State Netball and Hockey Centre, Melbourne
Umpires:
James Unkles (AUS)
Timothy Sheahan (AUS)

20 October 2019
14:30 (AEDT)

NSW Pride (New South Wales)	6–1	(Victoria (state)) HC Melbourne
Lovett 10', 10', 27'; Govers 37', 37'; Ogilvie 52'	Report	Ford 58'

Sydney Olympic Park, Sydney
Umpires:
Zeke Newman (AUS)
Adam Kearns (AUS)

20 October 2019
14:30 (AEST)

Brisbane Blaze (Queensland)	5–1	(Western Australia) Perth Thundersticks
Weyer 15'; Rintala 26'; D. Wotherspoon 29', 29'; Beale 54'	Report	Mitton 36'

Queensland State Hockey Centre, Brisbane
Umpires:
Ben de Young (AUS)
Stephen Rogers (AUS)

20 October 2019
15:30 (AEDT)

Canberra Chill (Australian Capital Territory)	2–6	(Tasmania) Tassie Tigers
Fukuda 31', 31'	Report	Ockenden 4', 15', 53', 53'; Hayward 24'; McCambridge 33'

National Hockey Centre, Canberra
Umpires:
Stirling Sharpe (AUS)
David Bridgford (AUS)

26 October 2019
14:00 (AWST)

Perth Thundersticks (Western Australia)	1–8	(New South Wales) NSW Pride
Harvie 50'	Report	Govers 5', 5', 25'; Willott 30'; Brand 36', 43', 43'; Dawson 45'

Perth Hockey Stadium, Perth
Umpires:
Matthew Claxton (AUS)
Daniel Johnston (AUS)

26 October 2019
15:30 (ACDT)

Adelaide Fire (South Australia)	4–6	(Australian Capital Territory) Canberra Chill
Fry 3', 4'; Farmilo 6', 6'	Report	Hawke 24', 24'; Day 26'; Backhus 37'; J. Staines 52', 52'

State Hockey Centre, Adelaide
Umpires:
Tim Pullman (AUS)
Nathan Jennings (AUS)

27 October 2019
14:00 (AEDT)

Tassie Tigers (Tasmania)	6–5	(Victoria (state)) HC Melbourne
McCambridge 21', 43'; Hayward 43'; Ockenden 46', 59', 59'	Report	Ephraums 14'; Simmonds 23', 23', 30+', 33'

Tasmanian Hockey Centre, Hobart
Umpires:
James Unkles (AUS)
Jayden Pearson (AUS)

2 November 2019
15:30 (AEDT)

Tassie Tigers (Tasmania)	4–0	(Western Australia) Perth Thundersticks
J. Beltz 4'; McCambridge 8', 8'; Gill 19'	Report

Tasmanian Hockey Centre, Hobart
Umpires:
Jayden Pearson (AUS)
Ben Hocking (AUS)

2 November 2019
16:30 (AEST)

Brisbane Blaze (Queensland)	0–5	(New South Wales) NSW Pride
	Report	Sharp 2'; Willott 45', 45'; Craig 60', 60+'

Queensland State Hockey Centre, Brisbane
Umpires:
Aaron Gotting (AUS)
Stephen Rogers (AUS)

3 November 2019
13:00 (AEDT)

HC Melbourne (Victoria (state))	6–5	(South Australia) Adelaide Fire
Ephraums 2'; Kleinschmidt 33', 33'; Ford 37', 37'; Simmonds 45+'	Report	Watanabe 9', 9'; Joyce 15+', 42', 52'

State Netball and Hockey Centre, Melbourne
Umpires:
Timothy Sheahan (AUS)
James Unkles (AUS)

=== Classification stage ===
Semi-finals
9 November 2019
(New South Wales) NSW Pride	6
(Victoria (state)) HC Melbourne	2
9 November 2019
(Queensland) Brisbane Blaze	7
(Tasmania) Tassie Tigers	1

Grand Final
16 November 2019
(New South Wales) NSW Pride	8
(Queensland) Brisbane Blaze	3

==== Semi-finals ====
9 November 2019
13:00 (AEDT)

NSW Pride (New South Wales)	6–2	(Victoria (state)) HC Melbourne
Stewart 3'; Lovett 38', 43'; Brand 41', 41'; Willott 43'	Report	Marais 39'; Ford 55'

Sydney Olympic Park, Sydney
Umpires:
Adam Kearns (AUS)
Stephen Rogers (AUS)

9 November 2019
18:30 (AEST)

Brisbane Blaze (Queensland)	7–1	(Tasmania) Tassie Tigers
Whetton 4', 4'; Anderson 6'; Rintala 25'; B. Wotherspoon 43'; D. Wotherspoon 55', 55'	Report	Hayward 33'

Queensland State Hockey Centre, Brisbane
Umpires:
Ben Hocking (AUS)
Zeke Newman (AUS)

==== Grand final ====
16 November 2019
14:00 (AEDT)

NSW Pride (New South Wales)	8–3	(Queensland) Brisbane Blaze
Brand 9', 9', 30'; Hayes 48', 48'; Ogilvie 55', 55'; Lovett 60'	Report	Rintala 7'; Weyer 57', 57'

State Netball and Hockey Centre, Melbourne
Umpires:
Ben Hocking (AUS)
Tim Pullman (AUS)

== Awards ==
Top Goalscorer(s)	Player of the League	Player of the Final
(New South Wales) Blake Govers	(Tasmania) Eddie Ockenden	(New South Wales) Flynn Ogilvie

== Statistics ==
=== Final standings ===
Pos	Team	Pld	W	WD	LD	L	GF	GA	GD	Pts	Final standing
1st place, gold medalist(s)	(New South Wales) NSW Pride	8	8	0	0	0	46	10	+36	40	Gold Medal
2nd place, silver medalist(s)	(Queensland) Brisbane Blaze	8	6	0	0	2	35	19	+16	30	Silver Medal
3rd place, bronze medalist(s)	(Tasmania) Tassie Tigers	7	4	0	0	3	24	26	−2	20	Eliminated in Semi-finals
4	(Victoria (state)) HC Melbourne	7	3	0	0	4	31	36	−5	15	Eliminated in Semi-finals
5	(Australian Capital Territory) Canberra Chill	6	1	1	0	4	17	34	−17	8	Eliminated in Group stage
6	(Western Australia) Perth Thundersticks	6	1	0	1	4	15	29	−14	7	Eliminated in Group stage
7	(South Australia) Adelaide Fire	6	0	0	0	6	16	30	−14	0	Eliminated in Group stage

Source: Hockey Australia

=== Goalscorers ===
There were 184 goals scored in 24 matches, for an average of 7.67 goals per match.

12 goals

- (New South Wales) Blake Govers

10 goals

- (New South Wales) Timothy Brand

9 goals

- (Queensland) Joel Rintala

8 goals

- (New South Wales) Kurt Lovett
- (Queensland) Dylan Wotherspoon
- (Tasmania) Eddie Ockenden

7 goals

- (Tasmania) Sam McCambridge
- (Victoria (state)) Russell Ford
- (Victoria (state)) Joshua Simmonds

6 goals

- (South Australia) Kota Watanabe

5 goals

- (Queensland) Corey Weyer
- (Western Australia) Trent Mitton

4 goals

- (Australian Capital Territory) Garry Backhus
- (Australian Capital Territory) Jake Staines
- (New South Wales) Ky Willott
- (Queensland) Jacob Whetton
- (Tasmania) Jeremy Hayward
- (Victoria (state)) Kiran Arunasalam
- (Victoria (state)) Nathan Ephraums
- (Victoria (state)) Will Gilmour
- (Western Australia) Tom Wickham

3 goals

- (New South Wales) Tom Craig
- (New South Wales) Flynn Ogilvie
- (South Australia) Isaac Farmilo
- (South Australia) Cameron Joyce
- (Victoria (state)) Aaron Kleinschmidt

2 goals

- (Australian Capital Territory) Daniel Conroy
- (Australian Capital Territory) Kentaro Fukuda
- (Australian Capital Territory) Jamie Hawke
- (New South Wales) Jack Hayes
- (Queensland) Jacob Anderson
- (Queensland) Daniel Beale
- (Queensland) Justin Douglas
- (South Australia) Angus Fry
- (Tasmania) Nick Leslie
- (Victoria (state)) Craig Marais
- (Western Australia) Daniel Robertson

1 goal

- (Australian Capital Territory) James Day
- (Australian Capital Territory) Aaron Kershaw
- (Australian Capital Territory) Benjamin Staines
- (New South Wales) Matthew Dawson
- (New South Wales) Ehren Hazell
- (New South Wales) Lachlan Sharp
- (New South Wales) Nathanael Stewart
- (Queensland) Scott Boyde
- (Queensland) Jared Taylor
- (Queensland) Blake Wotherspoon
- (South Australia) Lachlan Busiko
- (South Australia) Hirotaka Zendana
- (Tasmania) Hayden Beltz
- (Tasmania) Joshua Beltz
- (Tasmania) Gobindraj Gill
- (Western Australia) Tim Geers
- (Western Australia) Jake Harvie
- (Western Australia) Brayden King
- (Western Australia) Alec Rasmussen

Source: Hockey Australia
