= 2021 Men's Trans-Tasman Hockey Series =

International field hockey competition

2021 Men's Trans–Tasman Hockey Series
Tournament details
- City: Palmerston North, New Zealand
- Dates: 27 May – 1 June
- Teams: 2 (from 1 confederation)
- Venue: Massey University

Final positions
- Champions: Australia
- Runner-up: New Zealand

Tournament statistics
- Matches played: 4
- Goals scored: 19 (4.75 per match)
- Top scorer(s): (Australia) Nathan Ephraums (Australia) Jeremy Hayward (Australia) Thomas Wickham (3 goals)

The 2021 Trans–Tasman Hockey Series was a field hockey series, comprising four test matches between the national teams of Australia and New Zealand. The series was held at Massey University in Palmerston North, from 27 May to 1 June.

Due to the ongoing impacts of the COVID-19 pandemic, the series was the first time the two teams played an international match since March 2020, in their respective FIH Pro League matches. The series was held simultaneously with a women's event.

== Squads ==
Australia

Head coach: Colin Batch

1. Lachlan Sharp
2. Thomas Craig
4. Jake Harvie
5. Thomas Wickham
6. Matthew Dawson
7. Nathan Ephraums
9. Jacob Anderson
10. Joshua Beltz
11. Edward Ockenden (C)
12. Jacob Whetton
13. Blake Govers
14. Dylan Martin
15. Joshua Simmonds
16. Timothy Howard
17. Aran Zalewski (C)
22. Flynn Ogilvie
23. Daniel Beale
24. Tyler Lovell (GK)
25. Trent Mitton
29. Timothy Brand
30. Andrew Charter (GK)
32. Jeremy Hayward
New Zealand

Head coach: Darren Smith

2. Oliver MacIntyre
3. David Brydon
4. Dane Lett
7. Nicholas Ross
9. Samuel Hiha
10. Steven Edwards
11. Jacob Smith
12. Samuel Lane
14. Jared Panchia
15. George Enersen (GK)
17. Nicholas Woods
21. Kane Russell
22. Blair Tarrant (C)
23. Dylan Thomas
24. Sean Findlay
25. Shea McAleese
27. Stephen Jenness
28. Dominic Newman
29. Hugo Inglis
30. George Muir
32. Nicholas Wilson
34. Leon Hayward (GK)

== Results ==
All times are local (NZST).

=== Standings ===
Pos	Team	Pld	W	D	L	GF	GA	GD	Pts
1	Australia	4	4	0	0	15	4	+11	12
2	New Zealand (H)	4	0	0	4	4	15	−11	0

Source: Hockey New Zealand
Rules for classification: 1) points; 2) goal difference; 3) games won; 4) head-to-head result.
(H) Hosts

=== Fixtures ===
27 May 2021
17:30

New Zealand	1–3	Australia
Findlay 54'	Report	Brand 37'; Mitton 57'; Wickham 60'

Umpires:
David Tomlinson (NZL)
Simon Taylor (NZL)

28 May 2021
17:30

New Zealand	0–3	Australia
	Report	Ephraums 12'; Govers 18'; Hayward 52'

Umpires:
Simon Taylor (NZL)
David Tomlinson (NZL)

30 May 2021
15:00

New Zealand	2–4	Australia
Russell 20'; MacIntyre 26'	Report	Mitton 7'; Hayward 8'; Govers 20'; Ephraums 36'

Umpires:
David Tomlinson (NZL)
Simon Taylor (NZL)

1 June 2021
19:30

New Zealand	1–5	Australia
McAleese 28'	Report	Ephraums 3'; Wickham 13', 54'; Hayward 48'; Anderson 53'

Umpires:
Simon Taylor (NZL)
David Tomlinson (NZL)

== Statistics ==
=== Goalscorers ===
There were 19 goals scored in 4 matches, for an average of 4.75 goals per match.

3 goals

- (Australia) Nathan Ephraums
- (Australia) Jeremy Hayward
- (Australia) Thomas Wickham

2 goals

- (Australia) Blake Govers
- (Australia) Trent Mitton

1 goal

- (Australia) Jacob Anderson
- (Australia) Timothy Brand
- (New Zealand) Sean Findlay
- (New Zealand) Oliver MacIntyre
- (New Zealand) Shea McAleese
- (New Zealand) Kane Russell

Source: FIH
