= 2022–23 Men's FIH Pro League =

Men's field hockey competition

- Dates: 28 October 2022 – 5 July 2023
- Teams: 9 (from 4 confederations)

Final positions
- Champions: Netherlands (2nd title)
- Runner-up: Great Britain
- Third place: Belgium

Tournament statistics
- Matches played: 72
- Goals scored: 348 (4.83 per match)
- Top scorer: (India) Harmanpreet Singh (18 goals)

The 2022–23 Men's FIH Pro League was the fourth edition of the Men's FIH Pro League, a field hockey championship for men's national teams. The tournament began on 28 October 2022 and finished on 5 July 2023.

The Netherlands won their second title.

== Format ==
The FIH changed the format for this season as there were no home and away matches and the season was divided into date blocks. To reduce financial and logistical issues, a set of three teams gathered at one venue and a "mini tournament" was contested where each team played two matches against one another. The changed format also reduced the issue of travel time and minimised the burden on players.

=== Point system and rankings ===
The winning team got three points. In case of a draw, both teams were given one point, with the winner of the shootout earning an extra point. The team finishing last was relegated to the Nations Cup.

== Teams ==
Following their withdrawal in the 2021–22 season due to COVID-19 related travel requirements, the national teams of Australia and New Zealand rejoined for this season.

- Argentina
- Australia
- Belgium
- Germany
- Great Britain
- India
- Netherlands
- New Zealand
- Spain

== Results ==
=== Standings ===
Pos	Team	Pld	W	SOW	SOL	L	GF	GA	GD	Pts	Relegation
1st place, gold medalist(s)	Netherlands (C)	16	10	1	3	2	46	31	+15	35	
2nd place, silver medalist(s)	Great Britain	16	8	3	2	3	46	27	+19	32	
3rd place, bronze medalist(s)	Belgium	16	10	0	0	6	42	37	+5	30	
4	India	16	8	3	0	5	51	42	+9	30	
5	Spain	16	8	0	3	5	37	40	−3	27	
6	Germany	16	6	2	0	8	31	35	−4	22	
7	Australia	16	5	1	2	8	41	40	+1	19	
8	Argentina	16	3	3	3	7	28	36	−8	18	
9	New Zealand (R)	16	0	1	1	14	26	60	−34	3	Relegated to 2023 FIH Nations Cup

Source: FIH
Rules for classification: 1) points; 2) matches won; 3) goal difference; 4) goals for; 5) head-to-head result; 6) field goals scored.
(C) Champion; (R) Relegated

=== Fixtures ===
All times are local.

28 October 2022
19:10

India	4–3	New Zealand
Mandeep M. 14'; Harmanpreet 42'; Mandeep S. 52', 57'	Report	Lane 23', 36'; Smith 35'

Kalinga Stadium, Bhubaneswar
Umpires:
Ben Göntgen (GER)
Michiel Otten (NED)

29 October 2022
19:10

New Zealand	2–3	Spain
Phillips 26'; Child 32'	Report	Pa. Cunill 8'; Reyné 39'; Amat 47'

Kalinga Stadium, Bhubaneswar
Umpires:
Michiel Otten (NED)
Rawi Anbananthan (MAS)

30 October 2022
19:10

India	2–3	Spain
Harmanpreet 27'; Abhishek 55'	Report	De Ignacio-Simó 17'; Miralles 27'; Reyné 57'

Kalinga Stadium, Bhubaneswar
Umpires:
Coen van Bunge (NED)
Rawi Anbananthan (MAS)

4 November 2022
19:10

India	7–4	New Zealand
Harmanpreet 7', 19'; Karthi 17', 38'; Raj Kumar 31'; Sukhjeet 50'; Jugraj 53'	Report	Child 2'; Lane 9'; Smith 14'; Woods 54'

Kalinga Stadium, Bhubaneswar
Umpires:
Coen van Bunge (NED)
Michiel Otten (NED)

4 November 2022
21:40

Belgium	2–3	Germany
Hendrickx 12', 36'	Report	Miltkau 6', 30'; T. Grambusch 55'

Estadio Mendocino de Hockey, Mendoza
Umpires:
Tyler Klenk (CAN)
Bruce Bale (ENG)

5 November 2022
19:10

Spain	1–1	New Zealand
Menini 47'	Report	Russell 60'
Penalties
Iglesias (penalty shoot-out missed); González (penalty shoot-out missed); Miralles (penalty shoot-out missed); Gispert (penalty shoot-out missed); Reyné (penalty shoot-out missed)	0–1	(penalty shoot-out scored) Findlay; (penalty shoot-out missed) Phillips; (penalty shoot-out missed) Woods; (penalty shoot-out missed) Lane

Kalinga Stadium, Bhubaneswar
Umpires:
Ben Göntgen (GER)
Rawi Anbananthan (MAS)

5 November 2022
21:40

Argentina	2–2	Germany
Toscani 11'; Rey 47'	Report	Peillat 8'; Rühr 37'
Penalties
Keenan (penalty shoot-out scored); Casella (penalty shoot-out scored); Toscani (penalty shoot-out scored); Acosta (penalty shoot-out missed); Della Torre (penalty shoot-out missed)	3–4	(penalty shoot-out scored) Wellen; (penalty shoot-out scored) Rühr; (penalty shoot-out scored) Trompertz; (penalty shoot-out scored) Prinz

Estadio Mendocino de Hockey, Mendoza
Umpires:
Federico García (URU)
Bruce Bale (ENG)

6 November 2022
19:10

India	2–2	Spain
Harmanpreet 12', 32'	Report	Miralles 43'; Amat 55'
Penalties
Harmanpreet (penalty shoot-out scored); Raj Kumar (penalty shoot-out scored); Shamsher (penalty shoot-out missed); Abhishek (penalty shoot-out scored)	3–1	(penalty shoot-out missed) Menini; (penalty shoot-out missed) Vilallonga; (penalty shoot-out scored) Clapés; (penalty shoot-out missed) Miralles

Kalinga Stadium, Bhubaneswar
Umpires:
Coen van Bunge (NED)
Ben Göntgen (GER)

6 November 2022
21:40

Argentina	2–1	Belgium
Vila 12'; Della Torre 55'	Report	Charlier 3'

Estadio Mendocino de Hockey, Mendoza
Umpires:
Bruce Bale (ENG)
Rachel Williams (ENG)

7 November 2022
21:40

Germany	0–1	Belgium
	Report	Boon 51'

Estadio Mendocino de Hockey, Mendoza
Umpires:
Federico García (URU)
Tyler Klenk (CAN)

8 November 2022
21:40

Argentina	0–3	Germany
	Report	Oruz 4'; Wellen 30'; H. Müller 39'

Estadio Mendocino de Hockey, Mendoza
Umpires:
Bruce Bale (ENG)
Rachel Williams (ENG)

9 November 2022
21:40

Argentina	2–4	Belgium
Vila 19'; Ferrero 59'	Report	Hendrickx 13', 29', 37', 55'

Estadio Mendocino de Hockey, Mendoza
Umpires:
Tyler Klenk (CAN)
Bruce Bale (ENG)

13 December 2022
21:40

Great Britain	3–0	Netherlands
Wallace 28', 39'; Roper 29'	Report

Polideportivo Provincial, Santiago del Estero
Umpires:
Federico García (URU)
Sean Rapaport (RSA)

14 December 2022
21:40

Argentina	2–2	Netherlands
Della Torre 33'; Casella 56'	Report	Hoedemakers 26'; Janssen 38'
Penalties
Toscani (penalty shoot-out scored); Capurro (penalty shoot-out scored); Domene (penalty shoot-out scored); Ferreiro (penalty shoot-out scored)	4–1	(penalty shoot-out missed) Croon; (penalty shoot-out missed) T. Brinkman; (penalty shoot-out scored) De Geus

Polideportivo Provincial, Santiago del Estero
Umpires:
Federico García (URU)
Sean Rapaport (RSA)

15 December 2022
21:40

Argentina	1–1	Great Britain
Casella 3'	Report	Waller 4'
Penalties
Domene (penalty shoot-out scored); Keenan (penalty shoot-out missed); Toscani (penalty shoot-out missed); Capurro (penalty shoot-out missed); Ferreiro (penalty shoot-out missed)	1–2	(penalty shoot-out missed) Wallace; (penalty shoot-out missed) Rushmere; (penalty shoot-out scored) Roper; (penalty shoot-out missed) Shipperley; (penalty shoot-out scored) Albery

Polideportivo Provincial, Santiago del Estero
Umpires:
Maggie Giddens (USA)
Sean Rapaport (RSA)

16 December 2022
21:40

Netherlands	1–1	Great Britain
T. Brinkman 42'	Report	Bandurak 14'
Penalties
Pieters (penalty shoot-out missed); T. Brinkman (penalty shoot-out missed); De Geus (penalty shoot-out missed); Bijen (penalty shoot-out missed)	0–2	(penalty shoot-out missed) Goodfield; (penalty shoot-out missed) Wallace; (penalty shoot-out missed) Morton; (penalty shoot-out scored) Albery; (penalty shoot-out scored) Ansell

Polideportivo Provincial, Santiago del Estero
Umpires:
Laurine Delforge (BEL)
Federico García (URU)

17 December 2022
21:40

Argentina	2–4	Netherlands
Toscani 54'; Martínez 55'	Report	Pieters 30'; De Geus 45'; Janssen 58'; T. Brinkman 60'

Polideportivo Provincial, Santiago del Estero
Umpires:
Sean Rapaport (RSA)
Ayanna McClean (TTO)

18 December 2022
21:40

Argentina	2–2	Great Britain
Domene 4'; Toscani 56'	Report	Roper 11'; Sanford 27'
Penalties
Toscani (penalty shoot-out scored); Domene (penalty shoot-out scored); Mazzilli (penalty shoot-out missed); Capurro (penalty shoot-out missed)	2–4	(penalty shoot-out scored) Calnan; (penalty shoot-out scored) Wallace; (penalty shoot-out scored) Roper; (penalty shoot-out missed) Albery; (penalty shoot-out scored) Ansell

Polideportivo Provincial, Santiago del Estero
Umpires:
Laurine Delforge (BEL)
Federico García (URU)

28 February 2023
19:10

Australia	2–2	Argentina
Hayward 15', 23'	Report	Rey 49'; Martins 54'
Penalties
Govers (penalty shoot-out missed); Harvie (penalty shoot-out missed); Craig (penalty shoot-out scored); Marais (penalty shoot-out scored)	2–4	(penalty shoot-out scored) Toscani; (penalty shoot-out scored) Casella; (penalty shoot-out scored) Ferreiro; (penalty shoot-out missed) Catán; (penalty shoot-out scored) Bugallo

Tasmanian Hockey Centre, Hobart
Umpires:
Javed Shaikh (IND)
Raghu Prasad (IND)

1 March 2023
19:10

Australia	2–4	Spain
Govers 21'; Marais 42'	Report	Reyné 11', 19'; Basterra 25'; Miralles 59'

Tasmanian Hockey Centre, Hobart
Umpires:
Raghu Prasad (IND)
Javed Shaikh (IND)

2 March 2023
19:10

Argentina	3–4	Spain
Casella 12'; Ferreiro 17', 50'	Report	Font 24'; Reyné 30', 34'; Miralles 60'

Tasmanian Hockey Centre, Hobart
Umpires:
David Tomlinson (NZL)
Raghu Prasad (IND)

3 March 2023
17:10

Australia	3–0	Argentina
Brand 2'; Craig 36'; Ephraums 47'	Report

Tasmanian Hockey Centre, Hobart
Umpires:
David Tomlinson (NZL)
Javed Shaikh (IND)

4 March 2023
17:10

Australia	1–3	Spain
Govers 51'	Report	Escudé 15'; Amat 44'; Iglesias 45'

Tasmanian Hockey Centre, Hobart
Umpires:
David Tomlinson (NZL)
Raghu Prasad (IND)

5 March 2023
17:10

Spain	0–1	Argentina
	Report	Casella 56'

Tasmanian Hockey Centre, Hobart
Umpires:
Javed Shaikh (IND)
Raghu Prasad (IND)

10 March 2023
19:10

India	3–2	Germany
Harmanpreet 30+'; Sukhjeet 32', 43'	Report	Kaufmann 45'; Struthoff 58'

Birsa Munda International Hockey Stadium, Rourkela
Umpires:
David Tomlinson (NZL)
Paul Walker (ENG)

11 March 2023
19:10

Australia	0–1	Germany
	Report	Hellwig 8'

Birsa Munda International Hockey Stadium, Rourkela
Umpires:
Ahmed El-Sayed (EGY)
Rawi Anbananthan (MAS)

12 March 2023
19:10

India	5–4	Australia
Harmanpreet 14', 15', 56'; Jugraj 18'; Karthi 26'	Report	J. Beltz 3'; Willott 43'; Staines 53'; Howard 57'

Birsa Munda International Hockey Stadium, Rourkela
Umpires:
David Tomlinson (NZL)
Ahmed El-Sayed (EGY)

13 March 2023
19:10

India	6–3	Germany
Jugraj 21'; Abhishek 22', 51'; Karthi 24', 46'; Harmanpreet 26'	Report	T. Grambusch 3'; Peillat 23'; Hellwig 31'

Birsa Munda International Hockey Stadium, Rourkela
Umpires:
Ahmed El-Sayed (EGY)
Rawi Anbananthan (MAS)

14 March 2023
19:10

Germany	1–2	Australia
Peillat 23'	Report	Whetton 12'; Welch 15'

Birsa Munda International Hockey Stadium, Rourkela
Umpires:
Paul Walker (ENG)
David Tomlinson (NZL)

15 March 2023
19:10

India	2–2	Australia
Vivek 2'; Sukhjeet 47'	Report	Ephraums 37', 52'
Penalties
Harmanpreet (penalty shoot-out scored); Hardik (penalty shoot-out missed); Vivek (penalty shoot-out missed); Sukhjeet (penalty shoot-out scored); Dilpreet (penalty shoot-out scored); Harmanpreet (penalty shoot-out scored)	4–3	(penalty shoot-out missed) Whetton; (penalty shoot-out scored) Harvie; (penalty shoot-out scored) Marais; (penalty shoot-out scored) Welch; (penalty shoot-out missed) Ephraums; (penalty shoot-out missed) Welch

Birsa Munda International Hockey Stadium, Rourkela
Umpires:
Rawi Anbananthan (MAS)
Paul Walker (ENG)

22 April 2023
16:40

New Zealand	2–5	Great Britain
Lett 28'; Greentree 49'	Report	Wallace 13'; Oates 23'; Calnan 24'; Bandurak 30'; Shipperley 34'

Ngā Puna Wai Sports Hub, Christchurch
Umpires:
Gareth Greenfield (NZL)
Steve Rogers (AUS)

23 April 2023
14:10

Australia	1–2	Great Britain
Willott 10'	Report	Ward 14'; Morton 22'

Ngā Puna Wai Sports Hub, Christchurch
Umpires:
Gareth Greenfield (NZL)
Steve Rogers (AUS)

25 April 2023
16:40

New Zealand	0–3	Australia
	Report	Rintala 3', 22', 24'

Ngā Puna Wai Sports Hub, Christchurch
Umpires:
Steve Rogers (AUS)
Gareth Greenfield (NZL)

28 April 2023
19:40

New Zealand	1–6	Great Britain
Brydon 51'	Report	Ward 25', 26', 43'; Bandurak 27', 37'; Wallace 57'

Ngā Puna Wai Sports Hub, Christchurch
Umpires:
Gareth Greenfield (NZL)
Steve Rogers (AUS)

29 April 2023
16:40

Great Britain	3–3	Australia
Ward 24'; Wallace 38'; Shipperley 54'	Report	Rintala 5', 48', 60'
Penalties
Albery (penalty shoot-out missed); Wallace (penalty shoot-out scored); Goodfield (penalty shoot-out missed); Waller (penalty shoot-out scored)	2–4	(penalty shoot-out scored) Welch; (penalty shoot-out missed) Rintala; (penalty shoot-out scored) Whetton; (penalty shoot-out scored) Willott; (penalty shoot-out scored) Ephraums

Ngā Puna Wai Sports Hub, Christchurch
Umpires:
Gareth Greenfield (NZL)
Steve Rogers (AUS)

30 April 2023
14:10

New Zealand	2–4	Australia
Kingstone 4'; Child 45+'	Report	Welch 3'; Willott 19'; Rintala 38'; Zalewski 47'

Ngā Puna Wai Sports Hub, Christchurch
Umpires:
Gareth Greenfield (NZL)
Steve Rogers (AUS)

26 May 2023
14:40

Belgium	2–1	India
T. Stockbroekx 18'; Onana 60'	Report	Mandeep S. 25'

Lee Valley Hockey and Tennis Centre, London
Umpires:
Ahmed El-Sayed (EGY)
Lim Hong-Zhen (SGP)

27 May 2023
12:40

Great Britain	4–2	India
Nurse 7'; Sorsby 32'; Morton 34'; Bandurak 54'	Report	Harmanpreet 14', 43'

Lee Valley Hockey and Tennis Centre, London
Umpires:
Ayanna McClean (TTO)
Sean Rapaport (RSA)

28 May 2023
12:40

Great Britain	3–1	Belgium
Rushmere 13'; Waller 14'; Bandurak 28'	Report	Cosyns 33'

Lee Valley Hockey and Tennis Centre, London
Umpires:
Lim Hong-Zhen (SGP)
Sean Rapaport (RSA)

2 June 2023
14:40

India	5–1	Belgium
Vivek 2'; Harmanpreet 21', 40'; Amit 20'; Dilpreet 60'	Report	Ghislain 46'

Lee Valley Hockey and Tennis Centre, London
Umpires:
Sean Rapaport (RSA)
Wanri Venter (RSA)

3 June 2023
12:40

Great Britain	4–4	India
Ward 8', 40', 47', 53'	Report	Harmanpreet 7'; Mandeep 19'; Sukhjeet 28'; Abhishek 50'
Penalties
Calnan (penalty shoot-out scored); Wallace (penalty shoot-out scored); Shipperley (penalty shoot-out missed); Roper (penalty shoot-out missed)	2–4	(penalty shoot-out scored) Manpreet; (penalty shoot-out scored) Harmanpreet; (penalty shoot-out scored) Lalit; (penalty shoot-out scored) Abhishek

Lee Valley Hockey and Tennis Centre, London
Umpires:
Ahmed El-Sayed (EGY)
Lim Hong-Zhen (SGP)

4 June 2023
12:40

Great Britain	2–3	Belgium
Bandurak 8'; Nurse 47'	Report	Cosyns 29'; T. Stockbroekx 37'; Dohmen 47'

Lee Valley Hockey and Tennis Centre, London
Umpires:
Lim Hong-Zhen (SGP)
Sean Rapaport (RSA)

7 June 2023
18:40

Netherlands	4–1	India
P. Reyenga 17'; Burkhardt 40'; Telgenkamp 41', 58'	Report	Harmanpreet 11'

HC Oranje-Rood, Eindhoven
Umpires:
Céline Martin-Schmets (BEL)
Ben Göntgen (GER)

8 June 2023
18:10

Argentina	0–3	India
	Report	Harmanpreet 32'; Amit 38'; Abhishek 58'

HC Oranje-Rood, Eindhoven
Umpires:
Hannah Harrison (ENG)
Ben Göntgen (GER)

9 June 2023
20:40

Netherlands	2–7	Australia
Bukkens 29', 53'	Report	Craig 12', 17'; Sharp 15'; Ephraums 16', 49'; Hayward 24'; Govers 35'

HC Oranje-Rood, Eindhoven
Umpires:
Laurine Delforge (BEL)
Sarah Wilson (SCO)

10 June 2023
15:10

Netherlands	3–2	India
Telgenkamp 7'; Burkhardt 41'; Hoedemakers 43'	Report	Sanjay 18'; Gurjant 46'

HC Oranje-Rood, Eindhoven
Umpires:
Ben Göntgen (GER)
Hannah Harrison (ENG)

11 June 2023
15:10

India	2–1	Argentina
Akashdeep 1'; Sukhjeet 13'	Report	Toscani 57'

HC Oranje-Rood, Eindhoven
Umpires:
Laurine Delforge (BEL)
Sarah Wilson (SCO)

12 June 2023
20:40

Netherlands	5–2	Australia
Boers 7', 52'; Hoedemakers 12'; Telgenkamp 14', 36'	Report	Ephraums 10'; Hayward 26'

HC Oranje-Rood, Eindhoven
Umpires:
Laurine Delforge (BEL)
Ben Göntgen (GER)

16 June 2023
15:10

Netherlands	3–2	Spain
Van Heijningen 33'; Bijen 45', 52'	Report	Gispert 12'; Iglesias 60'

Lee Valley Hockey and Tennis Centre, London
Umpires:
Tyler Klenk (CAN)
Germán Montes de Oca (ARG)

16 June 2023
17:40

Argentina	6–1	New Zealand
Domene 6', 15', 36', 49'; Martínez 52'; Bugallo 56'	Report	Russell 2'

Wilrijkse Plein Antwerp, Antwerp
Umpires:
Martin Madden (SCO)
Coen van Bunge (NED)

17 June 2023
15:10

Great Britain	3–0	Germany
Bandurak 2'; Goodfield 52'; Ward 59'	Report

Lee Valley Hockey and Tennis Centre, London
Umpires:
Alison Keogh (IRL)
Germán Montes de Oca (ARG)

17 June 2023
16:40

Belgium	5–4	Australia
Onana 6'; T. Stockbroekx 17'; De Sloover 47'; Van Dessel 55'; Luypaert 59'	Report	Beale 13'; Whetton 40'; Willott 44'; Govers 57'

Wilrijkse Plein Antwerp, Antwerp
Umpires:
Coen van Bunge (NED)
Martin Madden (SCO)

18 June 2023
15:10

Great Britain	3–0	Spain
Bandurak 34', 58'; Morton 60'	Report

Lee Valley Hockey and Tennis Centre, London
Umpires:
Tyler Klenk (CAN)
Céline Martin-Schmets (BEL)

18 June 2023
16:40

Belgium	3–1	New Zealand
Cosyns 22'; Luypaert 34'; Dockier 48'	Report	Russell 42'

Wilrijkse Plein Antwerp, Antwerp
Umpires:
Martin Madden (SCO)
Michelle Meister (GER)

19 June 2023
17:40

Spain	2–2	Netherlands
Clapés 18'; Miralles 47'	Report	T. Brinkman 28', 34'
Penalties
Iglesias (penalty shoot-out missed); Miralles (penalty shoot-out scored); Bonastre (penalty shoot-out missed); Gispert (penalty shoot-out missed)	1–3	(penalty shoot-out scored) T. Brinkman; (penalty shoot-out scored) Van Dam; (penalty shoot-out scored) De Geus

Lee Valley Hockey and Tennis Centre, London
Umpires:
Tyler Klenk (CAN)
Alison Keogh (IRL)

19 June 2023
18:10

New Zealand	2–2	Argentina
Russell 21'; Phillips 30'	Report	Domene 25'; Della Torre 35'
Penalties
Woods (penalty shoot-out missed); Lane (penalty shoot-out scored); Boyde (penalty shoot-out missed); Thomas (penalty shoot-out scored)	2–4	(penalty shoot-out scored) Keenan; (penalty shoot-out scored) Domene; (penalty shoot-out missed) Toscani; (penalty shoot-out scored) Casella; (penalty shoot-out scored) Ferreiro

Wilrijkse Plein Antwerp, Antwerp
Umpires:
Coen van Bunge (NED)
Liu Xiaoying (CHN)

20 June 2023
12:10

Great Britain	2–3	Germany
Ward 9'; Bandurak 40'	Report	Hartkopf 2'; Mazkour 19'; Peillat 60'

Lee Valley Hockey and Tennis Centre, London
Umpires:
Germán Montes de Oca (ARG)
Tyler Klenk (CAN)

20 June 2023
20:40

Belgium	3–1	Australia
Luypaert 12', 41'; De Kerpel 56'	Report	Govers 52'

Wilrijkse Plein Antwerp, Antwerp
Umpires:
Coen van Bunge (NED)
Martin Madden (SCO)

21 June 2023
17:40

Great Britain	2–3	Spain
Bandurak 23'; Roper 30'	Report	Reyné 9'; Lacalle 33'; Iglesias 42'

Lee Valley Hockey and Tennis Centre, London
Umpires:
Germán Montes de Oca (ARG)
Alison Keogh (IRL)

21 June 2023
20:40

Belgium	1–0	New Zealand
Cosyns 11'	Report

Wilrijkse Plein Antwerp, Antwerp
Umpires:
Martin Madden (SCO)
Annelize Rostron (RSA)

23 June 2023
17:10

Germany	4–3	New Zealand
Weigand 10', 44'; Miltkau 39'; Peillat 60'	Report	Lane 8', 25'; Tarrant 19'

Wagener Stadium, Amsterdam
Umpires:
Jonas van't Hek (NED)
Irene Presenqui (ARG)

24 June 2023
17:40

Netherlands	1–1	Germany
Van Dam 15'	Report	Peillat 33'
Penalties
T. Brinkman (penalty shoot-out scored); De Geus (penalty shoot-out missed); Van Dam (penalty shoot-out missed)	1–4	(penalty shoot-out scored) Wellen; (penalty shoot-out scored) H. Müller; (penalty shoot-out scored) Prinz; (penalty shoot-out scored) Große

Wagener Stadium, Amsterdam
Umpires:
Jonas van't Hek (NED)
Gabriel Labate (ARG)

25 June 2023
15:10

Netherlands	3–2	New Zealand
Blok 33', 60'; J. Brinkman 58'	Report	Russell 16', 19'

Wagener Stadium, Amsterdam
Umpires:
Jonas van't Hek (NED)
Liu Xiaoying (CHN)

26 June 2023
17:10

New Zealand	1–4	Germany
Hiha 38'	Report	Herzbruch 3', 57'; Peillat 34', 60'

Wagener Stadium, Amsterdam
Umpires:
Gabriel Labate (ARG)
Jonas van't Hek (NED)

27 June 2023
19:40

Netherlands	2–0	Germany
T. Brinkman 23'; Janssen 35'	Report

Wagener Stadium, Amsterdam
Umpires:
Gabriel Labate (ARG)
Irene Presenqui (ARG)

28 June 2023
19:40

Netherlands	4–1	New Zealand
Bijen 12'; Van der Horst 15'; Janssen 54'; J. Brinkman 55'	Report	Thomas 41'

Wagener Stadium, Amsterdam
Umpires:
Gabriel Labate (ARG)
Annelize Rostron (RSA)

30 June 2023
20:40

Belgium	7–2	Spain
Wegnez 5', 48'; Van Aubel 12'; Hendrickx 20', 30'; Luypaert 26'; Dohmen 55'	Report	Iglesias 3'; Menini 58'

Wilrijkse Plein Antwerp, Antwerp
Umpires:
Martin Madden (SCO)
Michiel Otten (NED)

1 July 2023
16:40

Belgium	1–6	Netherlands
Hendrickx 50'	Report	Bijen 2'; Hoedemakers 12'; Van Heijningen 23'; Janssen 32'; Wortelboer 49'; T. Brinkman 60'

Wilrijkse Plein Antwerp, Antwerp
Umpires:
Martin Madden (SCO)
Sarah Wilson (SCO)

2 July 2023
14:10

Germany	1–3	Spain
Sperling 53'	Report	Iglesias 52'; Vilallonga 58'; González 60'

Wilrijkse Plein Antwerp, Antwerp
Umpires:
Michiel Otten (NED)
Irene Presenqui (ARG)

3 July 2023
20:40

Belgium	5–1	Spain
Dockier 32'; De Kerpel 37'; Hendrickx 41', 49'; Wegnez 42'	Report	Clapés 56'

Wilrijkse Plein Antwerp, Antwerp
Umpires:
Martin Madden (SCO)
Alison Keogh (IRL)

4 July 2023
20:40

Belgium	2–4	Netherlands
Hendrickx 19', 32'	Report	Van Dam 7'; Janssen 21'; T. Brinkman 26'; Burkhardt 47'

Wilrijkse Plein Antwerp, Antwerp
Umpires:
Martin Madden (SCO)
Sarah Wilson (SCO)

5 July 2023
18:10

Spain	4–3	Germany
Cunill 23'; Basterra 42'; Lacalle 51'; González 57'	Report	Glander 1'; Sperling 30'; Brilla 45'

Wilrijkse Plein Antwerp, Antwerp
Umpires:
Martin Madden (SCO)
Michiel Otten (NED)

== Goalscorers ==
There were 348 goals scored in 72 matches, for an average of 4.83 goals per match.

18 goals

- (India) Harmanpreet Singh

13 goals

- (Belgium) Alexander Hendrickx

12 goals

- (United Kingdom) Nick Bandurak

11 goals

- (United Kingdom) Samuel Ward

8 goals

- (Germany) Gonzalo Peillat

7 goals

- (Australia) Joel Rintala
- (Netherlands) Thierry Brinkman
- (Spain) Marc Reyné

6 goals

- (Argentina) Tomás Domene
- (Australia) Nathan Ephraums
- (India) Sukhjeet Singh
- (Netherlands) Jip Janssen
- (New Zealand) Kane Russell

5 goals

- (Australia) Blake Govers
- (Belgium) Loïck Luypaert
- (United Kingdom) Zachary Wallace
- (India) Abhishek
- (India) Selvam Karthi
- (Netherlands) Duco Telgenkamp
- (New Zealand) Sam Lane
- (Spain) Álvaro Iglesias
- (Spain) Marc Miralles

4 goals

- (Argentina) Maico Casella
- (Argentina) Lucas Toscani
- (Australia) Jeremy Hayward
- (Australia) Ky Willott
- (Belgium) Tanguy Cosyns
- (India) Mandeep Singh
- (Netherlands) Koen Bijen
- (Netherlands) Tjep Hoedemakers

3 goals

- (Argentina) Nicolás Della Torre
- (Australia) Thomas Craig
- (Belgium) Thibeau Stockbroekx
- (Belgium) Victor Wegnez
- (Germany) Marco Miltkau
- (United Kingdom) Lee Morton
- (United Kingdom) Phil Roper
- (India) Jugraj Singh
- (Netherlands) Boris Burkhardt
- (New Zealand) Simon Child
- (Spain) Pere Amat

2 goals

- (Argentina) Martín Ferreiro
- (Argentina) Lucas Martínez
- (Argentina) Matías Rey
- (Argentina) Lucas Vila
- (Australia) Jack Welch
- (Australia) Jacob Whetton
- (Belgium) Sébastien Dockier
- (Belgium) John-John Dohmen
- (Belgium) Nicolas De Kerpel
- (Belgium) Nelson Onana
- (Germany) Tom Grambusch
- (Germany) Malte Hellwig
- (Germany) Timm Herzbruch
- (Germany) Florian Sperling
- (Germany) Justus Weigand
- (United Kingdom) Timothy Nurse
- (United Kingdom) Rupert Shipperley
- (United Kingdom) Jack Waller
- (India) Amit Rohidas
- (India) Vivek Prasad
- (Netherlands) Justen Blok
- (Netherlands) Timo Boers
- (Netherlands) Jasper Brinkman
- (Netherlands) Miles Bukkens
- (Netherlands) Thijs van Dam
- (New Zealand) Hayden Phillips
- (New Zealand) Jacob Smith
- (Spain) José Basterra
- (Spain) Gerard Clapés
- (Spain) Pau Cunill
- (Spain) Enrique González
- (Spain) Borja Lacalle
- (Spain) Joaquín Menini

1 goal

- (Argentina) Agustín Bugallo
- (Argentina) Lautaro Ferrero
- (Argentina) Tobías Martins
- (Australia) Daniel Beale
- (Australia) Joshua Beltz
- (Australia) Tim Brand
- (Australia) Timothy Howard
- (Australia) Craig Marais
- (Australia) Lachlan Sharp
- (Australia) Benjamin Staines
- (Australia) Aran Zalewski
- (Belgium) Florent van Aubel
- (Belgium) Tom Boon
- (Belgium) Cédric Charlier
- (Belgium) Arno van Dessel
- (Belgium) William Ghislain
- (Belgium) Arthur de Sloover
- (Germany) Jakob Brilla
- (Germany) Paul Glander
- (Germany) Raphael Hartkopf
- (Germany) Paul-Philipp Kaufmann
- (Germany) Elian Mazkour
- (Germany) Hannes Müller
- (Germany) Timur Oruz
- (Germany) Christopher Rühr
- (Germany) Michel Struthoff
- (Germany) Niklas Wellen
- (United Kingdom) Will Calnan
- (United Kingdom) David Goodfield
- (United Kingdom) James Oates
- (United Kingdom) Stuart Rushmere
- (United Kingdom) Liam Sanford
- (United Kingdom) Thomas Sorsby
- (India) Mandeep Mor
- (India) Raj Kumar Pal
- (India) Sanjay
- (India) Akashdeep Singh
- (India) Dilpreet Singh
- (India) Gurjant Singh
- (Netherlands) Jonas de Geus
- (Netherlands) Steijn van Heijningen
- (Netherlands) Jair van der Horst
- (Netherlands) Terrance Pieters
- (Netherlands) Pepijn Reyenga
- (Netherlands) Derck de Vilder
- (Netherlands) Floris Wortelboer
- (New Zealand) David Brydon
- (New Zealand) Connor Greentree
- (New Zealand) Sam Hiha
- (New Zealand) Kim Kingstone
- (New Zealand) Dane Lett
- (New Zealand) Blair Tarrant
- (New Zealand) Dylan Thomas
- (New Zealand) Nic Woods
- (Spain) Marc Escudé
- (Spain) Bruno Font
- (Spain) Xavier Gispert
- (Spain) Eduard de Ignacio-Simó
- (Spain) Rafael Vilallonga

Source: FIH

== See also ==
- 2022–23 Women's FIH Pro League
