= 2017 Sultan Azlan Shah Cup =

Field hockey tournament

Tournament details
- Host country: Malaysia
- City: Ipoh
- Dates: 29 April 2017–6 May 2017
- Teams: 6
- Venue: Azlan Shah Stadium

Final positions
- Champions: Great Britain (2nd title)
- Runner-up: Australia
- Third place: India

Tournament statistics
- Matches played: 18
- Goals scored: 73 (4.06 per match)
- Top scorer(s): (Australia) Thomas Craig (Australia) Trent Mitton (India) Mandeep Singh (5 goals)
- Best player: (Australia) Thomas Craig
- Best goalkeeper: (Japan) Suguru Shimmoto
All statistics are correct as of 6 May 2017


The 2017 Sultan Azlan Shah Cup was the 26th edition of the Sultan Azlan Shah Cup. It was held in Ipoh, Perak, Malaysia from 29 April – 6 May 2017.

The number of teams for this year’s cup had decreased by one compared to last year’s tournament where seven teams competed. Pakistan and Canada, who competed previously, would not join this edition and Great Britain had been invited.

Great Britain defeated Australia 4–3 in the final to win the cup.

== Participating nations ==
Six countries are participating in this year's tournament:

- Malaysia (Host)
- Australia
- Great Britain
- India
- Japan
- New Zealand

== Umpires ==
1. Sean Rapaport (RSA)
2. Napoleon Chanamthabam (IND)
3. Shigeki Kodama (JPN)
4. Eric Koh Kim Lai (MAS)
5. Nichol Bevan (NZL)
6. Steve Rogers (AUS)
7. Paul Walker (GBR)
8. Bruce Bale (ENG) - Video Umpire

== Results ==
All times are in Malaysia Standard Time (UTC+08:00).

=== Pool ===
Pos	Team	Pld	W	D	L	GF	GA	GD	Pts	Qualification
1	Australia	5	3	1	1	14	7	+7	10	Advance to Final
2	Great Britain	5	3	1	1	12	9	+3	10	Advance to Final
3	India	5	2	1	2	10	9	+1	7	Third place match
4	New Zealand	5	2	1	2	7	9	−2	7	Third place match
5	Japan	5	1	1	3	12	15	−3	4	Fifth place match
6	Malaysia (H)	5	1	1	3	3	9	−6	4	Fifth place match

Source: FIH
Rules for classification: 1) points; 2) goal difference; 3) goals scored; 4) head-to-head result.
(H) Hosts

29 April 2017
16:05 MST

Great Britain	2–2	India
T. Carson 25'; Forsyth 52'	Report	Akashdeep 19'; Mandeep 47'

Umpires:
Eric Koh Kim Lai (MAS)
Sean Rapaport (RSA)

29 April 2017
18:05 MST

New Zealand	1–1	Australia
Newman 52'	Report	T. Craig 32'

Umpires:
Paul Walker (GBR)
Shigeki Kodama (JPN)

29 April 2017
20:35 MST

Malaysia	1–1	Japan
Razie 8'	Report	Yamada 40'

Umpires:
Nichol Bevan (NZL)
Steve Rogers (AUS)

30 April 2017
16:05 MST

India	3–0	New Zealand
Mandeep 23'; Harmanpreet 27', 47'	Report

Umpires:
Eric Koh Kim Lai (MAS)
Steve Rogers (AUS)

30 April 2017
18:05 MST

Japan	3–5	Great Britain
Ke. Tanaka 14', 38'; Watanabe 49'	Report	Middleton 3'; Goodfield 12'; Ward 15'; T. Carson 32'; Forsyth 52'

Umpires:
Napoleon Chanamthabam (IND)
Nichol Bevan (NZL)

30 April 2017
20:35 MST

Australia	6–1	Malaysia
T. Craig 11', 38', 45'; Mitton 23', 27', 58'	Report	Faizal 42'

Umpires:
Sean Rapaport (RSA)
Paul Walker (GBR)

2 May 2017
16:05 MST

India	1–3	Australia
Harmanpreet 26'	Report	Ockenden 30'; T. Craig 34'; Wickham 51'

Umpires:
Eric Koh Kim Lai (MAS)
Paul Walker (GBR)

2 May 2017
18:05 MST

New Zealand	3–2	Japan
Russell 18', 32'; Lane 35'	Report	Yamada 9', 50'

Umpires:
Napoleon Chanamthabam (IND)
Steve Rogers (AUS)

2 May 2017
20:35 MST

Malaysia	0–1	Great Britain
	Report	Forsyth 26'

Umpires:
Shigeki Kodama (JPN)
Sean Rapaport (RSA)

3 May 2017
16:05 MST

Japan	3–4	India
Murata 10'; Yoshihara 43'; Mitani 45'	Report	Rupinder Pal 6'; Mandeep 45', 51', 58'

Umpires:
Nichol Bevan (NZL)
Steve Rogers (AUS)

3 May 2017
18:05 MST

Great Britain	1–2	Australia
Gleghorne 51'	Report	Mitton 44'; Dawson 52'

Umpires:
Eric Koh Kim Lai (MAS)
Sean Rapaport (RSA)

3 May 2017
20:35 MST

New Zealand	1-0	Malaysia
Russell 25'	Report

Umpires:
Paul Walker (GBR)
Napoleon Chanamthabam (IND)

5 May 2017
16:05 MST

Great Britain	3–2	New Zealand
Ward 9'; Roper 39'; Gleghorne 49'	Report	Newman 30'; Russell 58'

Umpires:
Eric Koh Kim Lai (MAS)
Steve Rogers (AUS)

5 May 2017
18:05 MST

Australia	2–3	Japan
Kleinschmidt 7'; Mitton 31'	Report	Yamada 44'; Yamasaki 56', 57'

Umpires:
Napoleon Chanamthabam (IND)
Sean Rapaport (RSA)

5 May 2017
20:35 MST

India	0–1	Malaysia
	Report	Shahril 51'

Umpires:
Shigeki Kodama (JPN)
Paul Walker (GBR)

=== Classification ===
==== Fifth and sixth place ====
6 May 2017
15:40 MST

Japan	1–3	Malaysia
Ka. Tanaka 28'	Report	Haziq 8'; Firhan 11'; Faizal 34'

Umpires:
Nichol Bevan (NZL)
Paul Walker (GBR)

==== Third and fourth place ====
6 May 2017
18:05 MST

India	4–0	New Zealand
Rupinder Pal 17', 27'; Sunil 48'; Talwinder 60'	Report

Umpires:
Shigeki Kodama (JPN)
Steve Rogers (AUS)

==== Final ====
6 May 2017
20:35 MST

Australia	3–4	Great Britain
Ockenden 28'; Pollard 34'; Wotherspoon 48'	Report	Forsyth 8'; Goodfield 11', 43'; Willars 33'

Umpires:
Eric Koh Kim Lai (MAS)
Sean Rapaport (RSA)

== Awards ==
The following five awards were presented at the conclusion of the tournament:

Top Goalscorer	Player of the Tournament	Goalkeeper of the Tournament	Player of the Final	Fairplay Award
Three Players (see list below)	(Australia) Thomas Craig	(Japan) Suguru Shimmoto	(United Kingdom) Alan Forsyth	New Zealand

== Final standings ==
Pos	Team	Pld	W	D	L	GF	GA	GD	Pts	Final Result
1st place, gold medalist(s)	Great Britain	6	4	1	1	16	12	+4	13	Gold Medal
2nd place, silver medalist(s)	Australia	6	3	1	2	17	11	+6	10	Silver Medal
3rd place, bronze medalist(s)	India	6	3	1	2	14	9	+5	10	Bronze Medal
4	New Zealand	6	2	1	3	7	13	−6	7	
5	Malaysia (H)	6	2	1	3	6	10	−4	7	
6	Japan	6	1	1	4	13	18	−5	4	

Source: FIH
(H) Hosts

== Goalscorers ==
There were 73 goals scored in 18 matches, for an average of 4.06 goals per match.

5 goals

- (Australia) Thomas Craig
- (Australia) Trent Mitton
- (India) Mandeep Singh

4 goals

- (United Kingdom) Alan Forsyth
- (Japan) Shota Yamada
- (New Zealand) Kane Russell

3 goals

- (United Kingdom) David Goodfield
- (India) Harmanpreet Singh
- (India) Rupinder Pal Singh

2 goals

- (Australia) Edward Ockenden
- (United Kingdom) Thomas Carson
- (United Kingdom) Mark Gleghorne
- (United Kingdom) Samuel Ward
- (Japan) Kenta Tanaka
- (Japan) Koji Yamasaki
- (Malaysia) Faizal Saari
- (New Zealand) Dominic Newman

1 goal

- (Australia) Matthew Dawson
- (Australia) Aaron Kleinschmidt
- (Australia) Joshua Pollard
- (Australia) Thomas Wickham
- (Australia) Dylan Wotherspoon
- (United Kingdom) Barry Middleton
- (United Kingdom) Phillip Roper
- (United Kingdom) Oliver Willars
- (India) Akashdeep Singh
- (India) Talwinder Singh
- (India) Sowmarpet V. Sunil
- (Japan) Genki Mitani
- (Japan) Kazuma Murata
- (Japan) Kaito Tanaka
- (Japan) Kota Watanabe
- (Japan) Heita Yoshihara
- (Malaysia) Firhan Ashaari
- (Malaysia) Razie Rahim
- (Malaysia) Shahril Saabah
- (Malaysia) Haziq Samsul
- (New Zealand) Samuel Lane

Source: FIH
