= 2017 Men's International Festival of Hockey =

Tournament details
- Host country: Australia
- City: Melbourne; Bendigo, Victoria
- Teams: 4
- Venue(s): State Netball and Hockey Centre; Bendigo Hockey Complex

Final positions
- Champions: Australia (2nd title)
- Runner-up: New Zealand
- Third place: Japan

Tournament statistics
- Matches played: 8
- Goals scored: 39 (4.88 per match)
- Top scorer(s): (Australia) Blake Govers (7 goals)

The 2017 Men's International Festival of Hockey is the second edition of the annual International Festival of Hockey. The tournament will be held in Victoria, Australia. The tournament will take place between 5–12 November in the Victorian cities, Melbourne and Bendigo.

All times are local (UTC+10:00).

== Participating nations ==
- Australia (defending champions)
- Japan
- New Zealand
- Pakistan

== Results ==
=== Bendigo ===
The first stage of the tournament is two test matches in Bendigo at the Bendigo Hockey Complex.

==== Test matches ====
5 November 2017
16:00

| New Zealand | 0–4 | Australia |
|---|---|---|
| | Report | Pollard 8'; Hayward 20', 46'; Arunasalam 45' |

Umpires:
Ben Hocking (AUS)
James Unkles (AUS)

6 November 2017
16:00

| Australia | 2–0 | New Zealand |
|---|---|---|
| Kleinschmidt 11'; Govers 47' | Report |

Umpires:
James Unkles (AUS)
Ben Hocking (AUS)

=== Melbourne ===
The second stage of the tournament is a 4 team competition at the State Netball and Hockey Centre in Melbourne.

==== Pool stage ====
| Pos | Team | Pld | W | D | L | GF | GA | GD | Pts | Qualification |
|---|---|---|---|---|---|---|---|---|---|---|
| 1 | Australia (H) | 3 | 3 | 0 | 0 | 19 | 3 | +16 | 9 | Final |
| 2 | New Zealand | 3 | 1 | 1 | 1 | 5 | 7 | −2 | 4 | Final |
| 3 | Japan | 3 | 1 | 1 | 1 | 5 | 8 | −3 | 4 | Third and fourth |
| 4 | Pakistan | 3 | 0 | 0 | 3 | 4 | 15 | −11 | 0 | Third and fourth |

First match(es) will be played: 8 November 2017. Source: Hockey Australia
Rules for classification: 1) points; 2) goal difference; 3) goals scored; 4) head-to-head result.
(H) Hosts

8 November 2017
16:30

| New Zealand | 1–1 | Japan |
|---|---|---|
| Muir 22' | Report | Zendana 19' |

Umpires:
Ben de Young (AUS)
Rawi Anbananthan (MAS)

8 November 2017
18:00

| Australia | 9–1 | Pakistan |
|---|---|---|
| Hayward 8'; Whetton 12'; Kleinschmidt 18', 33'; Govers 43', 55', 60'; Arunasalam 47'; Wickham 57' | Report | Mahmood 32' |

Umpires:
Simon Taylor (NZL)
Michihiko Watanbe (JPN)

9 November 2017
15:00

| Pakistan | 1–3 | Japan |
|---|---|---|
| Atiq 60' | Report | Tanaka 14', 46'; Mitani 50' |

Umpires:
Simon Taylor (AUS)
Ben de Young (AUS)

9 November 2017
18:00

| Australia | 4–1 | New Zealand |
|---|---|---|
| Govers 7'; Kleinschmidt 14', 32'; Arunasalam 50' | Report | J. Panchia 47' |

Umpires:
Michihiko Watanbe (JPN)
Rawi Anbananthan (MAS)

11 November 2017
15:30

| New Zealand | 3–2 | Pakistan |
|---|---|---|
| Phillips 18'; Muir 37'; Child 57' | Report | Bhutta 6'; Butt 35' |

Umpires:
Ben de Young (AUS)
Michihiko Watanabe (JPN)

11 November 2017
18:30

| Australia | 6–1 | Japan |
|---|---|---|
| Beale 9'; Govers 9', 39'; Hayward 21'; Pollard 23'; Wickham 39' | Report | Zendana 45' |

Umpires:
Simon Taylor (NZL)
Rawi Anbananthan (MAS)

==== Classification matches ====
===== Third and fourth place =====
12 November 2017
15:00

| Japan | 2–1 | Pakistan |
|---|---|---|
| Tanaka 14'; Murata 57' | Report | Ahmad 13' |

===== Final =====
12 November 2017
18:30

| Australia | 2–1 | New Zealand |
|---|---|---|
| Whetton 30'; Govers 38' | Report | Muir 49' |

Umpires:
Michihiko Watanbe (JPN)
Rawi Anbananthan (MAS)

== Statistics ==
=== Goalscorers ===
7 Goals

- (Australia) Blake Govers

4 Goals

- (Australia) Aaron Kleinschmidt

2 Goals

- (Australia) Kiran Arunasalam
- (Australia) Jeremy Hayward
- (Australia) Tom Wickham
- (Japan) Kenta Tanaka
- (Japan) Hirotaka Zendana
- (New Zealand) George Muir

1 Goal

- (Australia) Daniel Beale
- (Australia) Joshua Pollard
- (Australia) Jake Whetton
- (Japan) Genki Mitani
- (New Zealand) Marcus Child
- (New Zealand) Jared Panchia
- (New Zealand) Hayden Phillips
- (Pakistan) Muhammad Atiq
- (Pakistan) Muhammad Umar Bhutta
- (Pakistan) Ammad Shakeel Butt
- (Pakistan) Abu Mhamood
