= Manpreet Singh =

Manpreet Singh may refer to:

- Manpreet Singh (boxer), Indian boxer
- Manpreet Singh (field hockey) (born 1992), Indian field hockey player
- Manpreet Singh (Italian cricketer) (born 1985), Italian cricketer
- Manpreet Singh (Singaporean cricketer) (born 1994), Singaporean cricketer
- Manpreet Singh (soldier) (1982 – 2023), Indian Army officer
- Manpreet Singh, Indian director of films including His Story of Itihaas (2025)

== See also ==
- Manpreet, an Indian male given name
- Singh, an Indian surname
- Manpreet Singh Ayali, Indian politician
- Manpreet Singh Badal (born 1962), Indian politician from the Badal family
