= Jake Staines =

Australian field hockey player (born 1997)

Personal information
- Full name: Jake Andrew Staines
- Born: 13 July 1997 (age 29) Goulburn, Australia

Sport
- Sport: Field hockey
- Position: Forward
Senior career
Years	Team	Caps	Goals
2015–2018	Canberra Lakers	24	4
2019–	Canberra Chill	36	16
2022–	Melville City	90	48
National team
Years	Team	Caps	Goals
2018–2018	Australia U–21	6	(3)
2023–	Australia Indoor	21	(14)
Medal record
Representing Australia
Men's field hockey
Sultan of Johor Cup
Bronze medal – third place	2018 Johor Bahru
Men's indoor hockey
Indoor Oceania Cup
Gold medal – first place	2024 Canberra
Nkosi Cup
Silver medal – second place	2025 Cape Town

Jake Andrew Staines (born 13 July 1997) is an international field and indoor hockey player from Australia.

He competes in Hockey Australia's premier domestic competition, the ONE Active Hockey One.

== Personal life ==
Staines was born in Goulburn, New South Wales. His twin brother, Ben, is also an international field and indoor hockey player.

== Australian leagues ==
Throughout his career, Staines has competed in four premier Australian leagues. He is currently competing in the Hockey One and the Hockey WA Premier One competitions, and previously competed in the Australian Hockey League (AHL) and the Capital League 1 in Canberra.

Staines has been a member of the Canberra Chill in the Hockey One since the league's inception in 2019. Prior to this, he represented the Canberra Lakers in the AHL from 2015 to 2018, when the league dissolved.

During his youth and into his senior career, he represented the Goulburn Geckos in the Capital League 1 and Goulburn District Hockey Association competitions.

In 2022 he made the move to Perth to compete in the Hockey WA Premier One competition following his inclusion in the Australian Development Squad. In the league, he competes for Melville City HC.

== National teams ==
=== Under–21 ===
Staines has also represented Australia at international level. He was a member of the Australian U–21 side, the Burras, at the 2018 Sultan of Johor Cup. At the tournament, the team won bronze.

=== Indoor ===
He has also been a member of the Australian Indoor team since 2023. During his time with the squad, he has appeared at the 2023 and 2025 editions of the FIH Indoor World Cup in Pretoria and Poreč, the 2024 Indoor Oceania Cup in Canberra, and the 2025 Nkosi Cup in Cape Town.

== Career statistics ==
Appearances and goals by club, season and competition
Club	Season	League			Other		Total	
Club	Season	Division	Apps	Goals	Apps	Goals	Apps	Goals
Canberra Lakers	2015	Australian Hockey League	6	1	—		6	1
Canberra Lakers	2016	Australian Hockey League	7	2	—		7	2
Canberra Lakers	2017	Australian Hockey League	7	1	—		7	1
Canberra Lakers	2018	Australian Hockey League	4	0	—		4	0
Canberra Lakers	Total		24	4	—		24	4
Canberra Chill	2019	ONE Active Hockey One	6	4	—		6	4
Canberra Chill	2022	ONE Active Hockey One	8	0	1	0	9	0
Canberra Chill	2023	ONE Active Hockey One	6	0	—		6	0
Canberra Chill	2024	ONE Active Hockey One	8	2	—		8	2
Canberra Chill	2025	ONE Active Hockey One	5	5	—		5	5
Canberra Chill	2026	ONE Active Hockey One	2	5	—		2	5
Canberra Chill	Total		35	16	1	0	36	16
Melville City HC	2022	Hockey WA Premier One	24	8	—		24	8
Melville City HC	2023	Hockey WA Premier One	23	19	—		23	19
Melville City HC	2024	Hockey WA Premier One	23	15	—		23	15
Melville City HC	2025	Hockey WA Premier One	10	3	—		10	3
Melville City HC	2026	Hockey WA Premier One	10	3	—		10	3
Melville City HC	Total		90	48	—		90	48
Career total			149	68	1	0	150	68
