= Ky Willott =

Australian field hockey player

Personal information
- Born: 15 March 2001 (age 25) Lake Macquarie, Australia

Sport
- Sport: Field hockey
- Position: Midfield
Senior career
Years	Team	Caps	Goals
2019–	NSW Pride	11	9
National team
Years	Team	Caps	Goals
2022–	Australia	11	(4)
Medal record
Men's field hockey
Representing Australia
Oceania Cup
Gold medal – first place	2023 Whangārei
Gold medal – first place	2025 Darwin

Ky Willott (born 15 March 2001) is an Australian field hockey player, who plays as a midfielder.

== Personal life ==
Ky Willott was born and raised in Lake Macquarie, New South Wales.

== Career ==
=== Domestic league ===
Willott is a member of the NSW Pride in Australia's national league, the Sultana Bran Hockey One. He made his debut in the inaugural season of the league.

Following his 2019 debut, he appeared in season two in 2022.

=== Kookaburras ===
In 2022, Willott was named in the Kookaburras for the first time. In April of that year, he made his senior international debut in a test series against Malaysia in Perth.
