= Kota Watanabe (field hockey) =

Japanese field hockey player

Personal information
- Born: 30 October 1996 (age 29) Fukui Prefecture, Japan
- Height: 1.80 m (5 ft 11 in)

Sport
- Sport: Field hockey
- Position: Forward
- Club: Adelaide Fire
Senior career
Years	Team	Caps	Goals
2019–present	Adelaide Fire	2	0
National team
Years	Team	Caps	Goals
2015–2016	Japan U21	11	(1)
2016–present	Japan	74	(8)
Medal record
Men's field hockey
Representing Japan
Asian Games
Gold medal – first place	2018 Jakarta	Team
- Updated on 24 July 2021

Kota Watanabe (渡辺 晃大, Watanabe Kōta; born 30 October 1996) is a Japanese field hockey player who plays as a forward for Japanese national team.

== Personal life ==
Kota Watanabe studies in the College of Business Administration at Ritsumeikan University.

== Career ==
=== National teams ===
==== Under–21 ====
In 2015, Watanabe made his debut for the Japan under–21 side at the Junior Asia Cup. The team finished fourth, qualifying for the Junior World Cup.

Following the Junior Asia Cup, Watanabe represented the side again at the 2016 Junior World Cup in Lucknow, India, where the team finished in thirteenth place.

==== Senior national team ====
Kota Watanabe made his senior international debut in 2016 at the Sultan Azlan Shah Cup in Ipoh, where the team came last.

Following his debut in 2016, Watanabe has been a regular inclusion in the Japanese team. His most prominent performance came in the 2018, at the Asian Games in Jakarta. At the tournament, the team won a gold medal, qualifying directly to the 2020 Summer Olympics in Tokyo.

=== Adelaide Fire ===
In 2019, Watanabe was signed to the Adelaide Fire hockey team to compete in the inaugural tournament of the Sultana Bran Hockey One League, Australia's new premier domestic competition.
