= Joshua Pollard (field hockey) =

Australian field hockey player

Personal information
- Full name: Joshua William Pollard
- Born: 20 October 1988 (age 37) Melbourne, Victoria

Sport
- Sport: Field hockey
- Position: Defender
Senior career
Years	Team	Caps	Goals
2006–2019	VIC Vikings	116	32
2019–	HC Melbourne	2	0
National team
Years	Team	Caps	Goals
2007–2009	Australia U–21	34	(14)
2016–2017	Australia	28	(4)
Medal record
Men's field hockey
Representing Australia
Junior World Cup
Bronze medal – third place	2009 Malaysia/Singapore	Team
Junior Oceania Cup
Gold medal – first place	2008 Brisbane	Team

Joshua William Pollard (born 20 October 1988) is a field hockey player from Australia.

== Career ==
=== Club ===
In the Hockey Victoria competition, before his move to Perth to join the Hockey Australia High Performance Program, Pollard played club hockey for Greensborough Hockey Club in Melbourne.

=== Domestic leagues ===
==== Australian Hockey League ====
Throughout his Australian Hockey League (AHL) career, Pollard represented his home state, Victoria. He made his debut for the VIC Vikings in 2006, playing every year until the tournament folded in 2018. In his 13-season career for the Vikings, Pollard won two titles, in 2016 and 2017.

==== Hockey One ====
In 2019, Pollard was named in the HC Melbourne team to participate in the inaugural tournament of Hockey Australia's new domestic national league, Hockey One.

=== National teams ===
==== Under–21 ====
Joshua Pollard made his debut for the 'Burras' in 2007 during a five match test series against the Malaysian U–21 team in Queensland. Following this, he also represented the side at an eight nations tournament in Malaysia.

In 2008, Pollard represented the side at the Junior Oceania Cup, where they won a gold medal and qualified to the Junior World Cup.

At the 2009 Junior World Cup in Malaysia and Singapore, Pollard was a member of the team that won a bronze medal.

==== Kookaburras ====
Following a standout performance at the 2016 AHL, Pollard made his debut for the Kookaburras at the 2016 Trans-Tasman Trophy.

In 2017, Pollard was named the national squad for the first time prior to the International Hockey Open in Darwin. Pollard has not represented Australia since the 2017 International Festival of Hockey in Melbourne.
