= Sean Findlay =

New Zealand field hockey player

Personal information
- Full name: Sean Ethan Findlay
- Born: 5 December 2001 (age 24) Taradale, New Zealand

Sport
- Sport: Field hockey
- Position: Midfield
- Club: Hamburger Polo Club
Senior career
Years	Team	Caps	Goals
2019	Central	7	2
2020–	Central Falcons	7	0
National team
Years	Team	Caps	Goals
2019	New Zealand U–21	6	(0)
2021–	New Zealand	6	(1)
Medal record
Oceania Cup
Silver medal – second place	2023 Whangārei
Silver medal – second place	2025 Darwin

Sean Ethan Findlay (born 5 December 2001) is a New Zealand field hockey player, who plays as a midfielder.

== Personal life ==
Sean Findlay was born and raised in the Hawke's Bay town of Taradale, New Zealand, he attended Taradale High School. His sister, Emma, also plays field hockey for New Zealand. His twins sister Greer and Hannah also is an international hockey player at 2025 Junior Oceania Cup.

== Career ==
=== National teams ===
==== Under-21 ====
Findlay debuted for the New Zealand U–21 team in 2019 at the Sultan of Johor Cup in Johor Bahru.

He was named in the 2021 squad for the FIH Junior World Cup to be held in India.

==== Black Sticks ====
In December 2020, Findlay was named in the Black Sticks squad for the first time.

Findlay made his debut for the national team in 2021, during a test series against Australia in Palmerston North. He also scored a goal in his debut match.

=== International goals ===
Goal	Date	Location	Opponent	Score	Result	Competition	Ref.
1	27 May 2021	Massey University, Palmerston North, New Zealand	Australia	1–1	1–3	2021 Trans–Tasman Series	
