= Johan Durst =

Australian field hockey player

Personal information
- Born: 18 March 1991 (age 35) Canterbury, Victoria, Australia

Sport
- Sport: Field hockey
- Position: Goalkeeper
Senior career
Years	Team	Caps	Goals
2015–2018	Victorian Vikings	-	-
2019–	HC Melbourne	-	-
National team
Years	Team	Caps	Goals
2011	Australia U–21	3	(0)
2018–2024	Australia	38	(0)
Medal record
Men's field hockey
Representing Australia
Commonwealth Games
Gold medal – first place	2022 Birmingham	Team
Oceania Cup
Gold medal – first place	2023 Whangārei
FIH Champions Trophy
Gold medal – first place	2018 Breda

Johan Durst (born 18 March 1991) is an Australian field hockey player, who plays as a goalkeeper.

== Personal life ==
Johan Durst was born and raised in Canterbury, Victoria. He completed a Bachelor of Commerce at Deakin University.

== Career ==
=== Domestic hockey ===
From 2015 until 2018, Durst was a member of the Victorian Vikings team in the Australian Hockey League.

In 2019, Durst was a member of the HC Melbourne team for the inaugural season of the Sultana Bran Hockey One League.

=== National teams ===
==== Under–21 ====
Johan Durst made his debut for Australia in 2011, where he was a member of the Under–21 team at the Sultan of Johor Cup in Johor Bahru. At the tournament, he won a silver medal.

==== Kookaburras ====
Durst was named in the national squad for the first time in 2018, following strong performances for Victoria in the AHL. He made his debut for the Kookaburras later that year in a test series against Germany in Moers. This was followed immediately by a gold medal at the FIH Champions Trophy in Breda.

Since his debut Durst has been a regular inclusion in the national squad, despite not making many appearances.
