= Jake Harvie =

Australian field hockey player (born 1998)

Personal information
- Full name: Jake Michael Harvie
- Born: 5 March 1998 (age 28) Dardanup, Western Australia, Australia
- Height: 172 cm (5 ft 8 in)
- Weight: 66 kg (146 lb)

Sport
- Sport: Field hockey
- Position: Defender
- Club: WA Thundersticks
National team
Years	Team	Caps	Goals
2017–	Australia	61	(3)
Medal record
Men's field hockey
Representing Australia
World Cup
Bronze medal – third place	2018 Bhubaneswar
Oceania Cup
Gold medal – first place	2019 Rockhampton
Gold medal – first place	2023 Whangārei
Champions Trophy
Gold medal – first place	2018 Breda
World League
Gold medal – first place	2016–17 Bhubaneswar	Team
Commonwealth Games
Gold medal – first place	2018 Gold Coast	Team
Gold medal – first place	2022 Birmingham	Team

Jake Michael Harvie (born 5 March 1998) is an Australian field hockey player who plays as a defender for the Australian national team. He also is a Commonwealth Games gold medallist.

Harvie was born in Dardanup, Western Australia, and made his senior international debut at the 2017 International Festival of Hockey in Bendigo, Australia.

Harvie won his first major tournament with Australia at the 2016-17 Hockey World League Final in Bhubaneswar, India. The team defeated Argentina 2–1 in the final to win the tournament.

In March 2018, Harvie was selected in the Australian national squad for the 2018 Commonwealth Games. The team won the gold medal, defeating New Zealand 2–0 in the final.

He is the grandson of former Australian three-time hockey Olympian Gordon Pearce.
