= Manpreet =

Manpreet is an Indian given name, popular in the Sikh community.

== List of people with the given name ==
- Manpreet Akhtar, Punjabi folk singer
- Manpreet Bachu, English actor
- Manpreet Bambra, Indian actress
- Manpreet Brar, Indian actress and model
- Manpreet Gony, Indian cricketer
- Manpreet Juneja, Indian cricketer
- Manpreet Kaur, Indian shot putter
- Manpreet Singh Ayali, Indian politician
- Manpreet Singh Badal, Indian politician
- Manpreet Singh, Indian boxer
- Manpreet Singh, Indian field hockey player
- Manpreet Singh, Italian cricketer
- Manpreet Singh, Singaporean cricketer

=== Fictional characters ===
- Manpreet Sharma, character from the British soap opera Emmerdale
