= Andrew Philpott =

Australian field hockey player

Personal information
- Nationality: Australian
- Born: 9 March 1990 (age 36)

Sport
- Sport: Hockey
Medal record
Representing Australia
Commonwealth Games
Gold medal – first place	2014 Glasgow	Team
Champions Trophy
Gold medal – first place	2016 London	Team
- Updated on 11 October 2014

Andrew Philpott (born 9 March 1990) is an Australian field hockey player. He competed in the men's hockey tournament at the 2014 Commonwealth Games where he won a gold medal.
