= Joel Rintala =

Australian field hockey player (born 1996)

Personal information
- Born: 24 July 1996 (age 30) Townsville, Queensland

Sport
- Sport: Field hockey
- Position: Forward
Senior career
| Years | Team | Caps | Goals |
| 2019– | Brisbane Blaze | - | - |
National team
| Years | Team | Caps | Goals |
| 2017 | Australia | 6 | (5) |
| 2023– | Australia | 16 | (15) |
Medal record
Men's field hockey
Representing Australia
Sultan of Johor Cup
| Gold medal – first place | 2017 Johor Bahru |

Joel Rintala (born 24 July 1996) is an Australian field hockey player, who plays as a forward.

== Personal life ==
Joel Rintala was born and raised in Townsville, Queensland.

He is currently in a relationship with Australian swimmer, Shayna Jack.

== Career ==
=== Domestic league ===
Rintala is a member of the Brisbane Blaze in Australia's national league, the Sultana Bran Hockey One. He made his debut in the inaugural season of the league.

Following his 2019 debut, he appeared in season two in 2022.

=== National teams ===
==== Burras ====
Rintala made his international debut at under–21 level during the 2017 Sultan of Johor Cup. He was a member of the Burras gold medal-winning campaign.

==== Kookaburras ====
In 2022, Rintala was named in the Kookaburras squad for the first time. He will make his debut for the team in 2023.
