= Tom Wickham =

Australian field hockey player

Personal information
- Full name: Thomas Joseph Wickham
- Born: 26 May 1990 (age 36) Morgan, South Australia
- Height: 182 cm (6 ft 0 in)
- Weight: 84 kg (185 lb)

Sport
- Sport: Field hockey
- Position: Forward
- Club: Perth Thundersticks
National team
Years	Team	Caps	Goals
2013–	Australia	59	(27)
Medal record
Men's field hockey
Representing Australia
Olympic Games
Silver medal – second place	2020 Tokyo	Team
Commonwealth Games
Gold medal – first place	2018 Gold Coast	Team
Gold medal – first place	2022 Birmingham	Team
FIH World League
Gold medal – first place	2016–17 Bhubaneswar	Team
Oceania Cup
Gold medal – first place	2017 Sydney
Gold medal – first place	2019 Rockhampton

Thomas Joseph Wickham (born 26 May 1990) is an Australian field hockey player, who plays as a forward.

== Personal life ==
Tom Wickham was born and raised in Morgan, South Australia.

He played representative hockey for his home state South Australia until 2014, when he chose to represent Western Australia at a national level.

== Career ==
He made his international debut in May 2013 during a test series against Korea.

Following his 2013 debut, Wickham did not represent Australia again until his recall into the senior men's squad in 2017. His first appearance in 2017 was during a test series against Pakistan.

Wickham's most notable performance with Australia was at the 2018 Commonwealth Games held in the Gold Coast, Australia, where the Kookaburras won a gold medal.

In 2019, Wickham represented Australia in season one of the FIH Pro League.

He has since represented the team in the FIH Pro League's second season in 2020.

Wickham was selected in the Kookaburras Olympics squad for the Tokyo 2020 Olympics. The team reached the final for the first time since 2004 but couldn't achieve gold, beaten by Belgium in a shootout.

=== International goals ===
Goal	Date	Location	Opponent	Score	Result	Competition	Ref.
1	28 March 2017	Marrara Hockey Centre, Darwin, Australia	Pakistan	3–0	6–1	Test Match	
2	29 March 2017	Marrara Hockey Centre, Darwin, Australia	Pakistan	1–0	3–0	Test Match	
3	2 May 2017	Azlan Shah Stadium, Ipoh, Malaysia	India	3–1	3–1	2017 Sultan Azlan Shah Cup	
4	17 July 2017	University of Witwatersrand, Johannesburg, South Africa	Japan	6–0	7–2	2016–17 HWL Semifinals	
5	23 July 2017	University of Witwatersrand, Johannesburg, South Africa	Spain	8–0	8–1	2016–17 HWL Semifinals	
6	11 October 2017	Sydney Olympic Park, Sydney, Australia	PNG	9–0	30–0	2017 Oceania Cup	
7	11 October 2017	Sydney Olympic Park, Sydney, Australia	PNG	15–0	30–0	2017 Oceania Cup	
8	11 October 2017	Sydney Olympic Park, Sydney, Australia	PNG	18–0	30–0	2017 Oceania Cup	
9	11 October 2017	Sydney Olympic Park, Sydney, Australia	PNG	24–0	30–0	2017 Oceania Cup	
10	11 October 2017	Sydney Olympic Park, Sydney, Australia	PNG	25–0	30–0	2017 Oceania Cup	
11	15 October 2017	Sydney Olympic Park, Sydney, Australia	New Zealand	1–0	6–0	2017 Oceania Cup	
12	15 October 2017	Sydney Olympic Park, Sydney, Australia	New Zealand	6–0	6–0	2017 Oceania Cup	
13	8 November 2017	State Netball and Hockey Centre, Melbourne, Australia	Pakistan	8–1	9–1	2017 Int. Festival of Hockey	
14	11 November 2017	State Netball and Hockey Centre, Melbourne, Australia	Japan	5–0	6–1	2017 Int. Festival of Hockey	
15	9 December 2017	Kalinga Stadium, Bhubaneswar, India	Germany	3–0	3–0	2016–17 HWL Final	
16	8 April 2018	Gold Coast Hockey Centre, Gold Coast, Australia	Scotland	3–0	6–1	XXI Commonwealth Games	
17	10 February 2019	Tasmanian Hockey Centre, Hobart, Australia	Germany	3–2	4–2	2019 FIH Pro League	
18	17 March 2019	Sydney Olympic Park, Sydney, Australia	New Zealand	1–0	5–1	2019 FIH Pro League	
19	17 March 2019	Sydney Olympic Park, Sydney, Australia	New Zealand	4–1	5–1	2019 FIH Pro League	
20	7 September 2019	Kalka Shades Hockey Fields, Rockhampton, Australia	New Zealand	2–0	2–2	2019 Oceania Cup	
21	1 February 2020	Sydney Olympic Park, Sydney, Australia	Great Britain	2–1	4–4	2020 FIH Pro League	
22	21 February 2020	Kalinga Stadium, Bhubaneswar, India	India	2–0	4–3	2020 FIH Pro League	
23	6 March 2020	Perth Hockey Stadium, Perth, Australia	Argentina	2–0	3–3	2020 FIH Pro League	
24	7 March 2020	Perth Hockey Stadium, Perth, Australia	Argentina	4–0	5–1	2020 FIH Pro League	
