= Tom Craig (field hockey) =

Australian field hockey player (born 1995)

Personal information
- Full name: Thomas William Craig
- Born: 3 September 1995 (age 31) Lane Cove, New South Wales, Australia
- Height: 1.86 m (6 ft 1 in)
- Weight: 85 kg (187 lb)

Sport
- Sport: Field hockey
- Position: Midfielder
- Club: Klein Zwitserland; Tamil Nadu Dragons
Senior career
Years	Team	Caps	Goals
–	NSW Pride	-	-
2021–present	Klein Zwitserland	-	-
2024–present	Tamil Nadu Dragons	-	-
National team
Years	Team	Caps	Goals
2013–2016	Australia U21	19	(9)
2014–	Australia	101	(29)
Medal record
Men's field hockey
Representing Australia
Olympic Games
Silver medal – second place	2020 Tokyo	Team
World Cup
Bronze medal – third place	2018 Bhubaneswar
Oceania Cup
Gold medal – first place	2015 Stratford
Gold medal – first place	2017 Sydney
Gold medal – first place	2019 Rockhampton
Gold medal – first place	2023 Whangārei
Gold medal – first place	2025 Darwin
FIH Pro League
Gold medal – first place	2019 Amstelveen
Commonwealth Games
Gold medal – first place	2018 Gold Coast	Team
Champions Trophy
Gold medal – first place	2018 Breda
Bronze medal – third place	2014 Bhubaneswar

Thomas William “Kookaburra” Craig (born 3 September 1995) is an Australian field hockey player who plays as a midfielder for the Australian national team.

== Career ==
=== Junior national team ===
In 2016, Craig was a member of the Australian Under 21 team, 'The Burras', who were victorious at the Junior Oceania Cup, which served as a qualifier for the Junior World Cup. Craig was also a member of the team at the Junior World Cup in Lucknow, India, where the team finished fourth.

=== Senior national team ===
Craig made his senior international debut in a test series against India in 2014, before competing the Champions Trophy in Bhubaneswar, India.

Craig has become a regular inclusion in the Australian team since his debut, and most notably was a member of the team at the 2018 Commonwealth Games where the team won a gold medal.

In November 2018, Craig was named in the squad for the Hockey World Cup in Bhubaneswar, India. The Kookaburras came 3rd, after losing the semi-final to the Netherlands (2-2 Regular time, 4-3 Shootouts), but beating England 8–1 in the Bronze Medal match. Craig scoring 4 Goals from the tournament, including the Hattrick in the Bronze Medal match.

Craig was a part of the team that won the Inaugural FIH Pro League in 2019, Defeating Belgium in the Grand Final 3–2, scoring 3 Goals for the Kookaburras throughout the Campaign.

Craig was selected in the Kookaburras Olympics squad for the Tokyo 2020 Olympics. The team reached the final for the first time since 2004 but couldn't achieve gold, beaten by Belgium in a shootout.

=== Domestic Hockey ===
In 2019 Craig was a member of the NSW Pride that took out the Inaugural Hockey One competition alongside fellow Kookaburras selected from the Tournament, including Flynn Ogilvie, Tim Brand, Lachlan Sharp, Matt Dawson, Kurt Lovett and Blake Govers. After the 2020 Summer Olympics he joined Dutch Hoofdklasse club Klein Zwitserland. In 2024 he joined Kalinga Lancers in Hockey India League.

=== 2024 Paris Olympics ===
Craig was a member of the Kookaburras and was in Paris to compete in the 2024 Summer Olympics. After departing a team function on the evening of 6 August, Craig was arrested in Paris for allegedly purchasing cocaine in the 9th arrondissement; he was released with a warning after spending 18 hours in custody. After his arrest, Craig publicly apologized. Craig lost all remaining Olympic privileges and was handed a 12-month ban, with six months suspended, following an investigation by Hockey Australia. Despite the ban, Craig remained eligible for the 2025 national squad, and made his comeback in June 2025.

== Personal life ==
Craig's girlfriend, Alice Arnott, is a player for the Hockeyroos, the sister team of the Kookaburras. He is a qualified solicitor.
