= Jacob Anderson (field hockey) =

Australian field hockey player

Personal information
- Full name: Jacob John Anderson
- Born: 22 March 1997 (age 29) Mackay, Queensland

Sport
- Sport: Field hockey
- Position: Forward
- Club: Queensland Blades
National team
Years	Team	Caps	Goals
2017	Australia U21	6	(2)
2018–	Australia	14	(7)
Medal record
Men's field hockey
Representing Australia
Commonwealth Games
Gold medal – first place	2022 Birmingham
FIH Pro League
Gold medal – first place	2019 Amstelveen
Oceania Cup
Gold medal – first place	2019 Rockhampton
- Updated on 8 September 2019

Jacob John Anderson (born 22 March 1997) is an Australian field hockey player who plays as a forward for the Australian national team.

== Personal life ==
Anderson grew up in Mackay, Queensland.

Other Mackay natives, Matthew Swann and Kirstin Dwyer, served as an inspiration for Anderson as he pursued hockey.

== Career ==
=== Junior national team ===
Anderson was first named in the 'Burras' squad in 2016. The following year he represented the Under 21 side at the 2017 Sultan of Johor Cup where the team won a gold medal.

=== Senior national team ===
Anderson made his international debut for the Kookaburras in 2018, in a test match against Argentina. Following this, he was a member in the Australia team at the 2018 Men's International Hockey Open in Darwin.

In November 2018, Anderson was named in the Kookaburras squad for the 2019 calendar year.
