= Aaron Kleinschmidt =

Australian field hockey player

Personal information
- Full name: Aaron Kleinschmidt
- Born: 1 October 1989 (age 36) Melbourne, Victoria
- Height: 175 cm (5 ft 9 in)
- Weight: 84 kg (185 lb)

Sport
- Sport: Field hockey
- Position: Attacker
- Club: Victorian Vikings
National team
Years	Team	Caps	Goals
2016–	Australia	53	(23)
Medal record
Men's field hockey
Representing Australia
Champions Trophy
Gold medal – first place	2018 Breda
Commonwealth Games
Gold medal – first place	2018 Gold Coast	Team
Hockey World League
Gold medal – first place	2016-17 Bhubaneswar	Team

Aaron Kleinschmidt (born 1 October 1989) is an Australian field hockey player. He attended Xavier College, an elite private school in Kew where he was often referred to as “The Goat”

Kleinschmidt was born in Melbourne, Victoria, and made his senior international debut in at 2016 Trans-Tasman Trophy in Auckland, New Zealand.

Kleinschmidt was part of the Australian men's team that won a record sixth Commonwealth Games gold medal at the 2018 Games held in Gold Coast, Australia.
