= Trent Mitton =

Australian field hockey player (born 1990)

Personal information
- Full name: Trent Grant Mitton
- Born: 26 November 1990 (age 35)

Sport
- Sport: Field hockey
- Position: Forward
- Club: Ranchi Rays
Senior career
Years	Team	Caps	Goals
–	WA Thundersticks	-	-
2015–	Ranchi Rays	-	-
National team
Years	Team	Caps	Goals
2010–	Australia	177	(82)
Medal record
Men's field hockey
Representing Australia
Olympic Games
Silver medal – second place	2020 Tokyo	Team
World Cup
Bronze medal – third place	2018 Bhubaneswar
Champions Trophy
Gold medal – first place	2012 Melbourne
Oceania Cup
Gold medal – first place	2017 Sydney
FIH Pro League
Gold medal – first place	2019 Amstelveen
Commonwealth Games
Commonwealth Games
Gold medal – first place	2010 Delhi	Team
Gold medal – first place	2014 Glasgow	Team

Trent Grant Mitton (born 26 November 1990) is an Australian field hockey player who plays for the WA Thundersticks and the Kookaburras. Mitton is a striker.

Mitton first joined the Australian team as part of the 19-member Champions Trophy squad at the 2010 Men's Hockey Champions Trophy in Mönchengladbach, Germany. He is part of the Australian team at the 2010 Commonwealth Games in New Delhi.

His father is Grant Mitton who represented Australia at the 1984 Summer Olympics in Los Angeles and his grandfather is Don Mitton who did likewise in New Zealand in 1958.

Mitton plays for the WA Thundersticks in the Australian Hockey League. He played for the team in the first found of the 2011 season.

In December 2011, Mitton was named as one of fourteen players to be on the 2012 Summer Olympics Australian men's national Olympic development squad. While this squad is not in the top twenty-eight and separate from the Olympic training coach, the Australian coach Ric Charlesworth did not rule out selecting from only the training squad, with players from the Olympic development having a chance at possibly being called up to represent Australia at the Olympics. He trained with the team from 18 January to mid-March in Perth, Western Australia.

== Personal ==
Trent Mitton spends his days away from hockey working as a sport teacher at Chisholm Catholic College.

== Achievements ==
Mitton was selected in the Kookaburras Olympics squad for the Tokyo 2020 Olympics. The team reached the final for the first time since 2004 but couldn't achieve gold, beaten by Belgium in a shootout.
