= Lachlan Sharp =

Australian field hockey player

Personal information
- Full name: Lachlan Thomas Sharp
- Born: 2 July 1997 (age 29) Lithgow, New South Wales, Australia

Sport
- Sport: Field hockey
- Position: Midfielder / Forward
- Club: Amsterdam HBC; NSW Pride; Ryde Hunters Hill Hockey Club
National team
Years	Team	Caps	Goals
2016	Australia U21	6	(2)
2017–	Australia	55	(12)
Medal record
Men's field hockey
Representing Australia
Olympic Games
Silver medal – second place	2020 Tokyo	Team
Oceania Cup
Gold medal – first place	2025 Darwin
FIH Pro League
Gold medal – first place	2019 Amstelveen
Champions Trophy
Gold medal – first place	2018 Breda
Commonwealth Games
Gold medal – first place	2018 Gold Coast	Team
Hockey World League
Gold medal – first place	2016–17 Bhubaneswar	Team
- Updated on 3 August 2021

Lachlan Thomas Sharp (born 2 July 1997) is an Australian field hockey player who plays as a midfielder or forward for the Australian national team.

== Career ==
Sharp was born in Lithgow, New South Wales, and made his senior international debut at the 2016-17 Hockey World League Final in Bhubaneswar, India.

Sharp was part of the Australian men's junior national team 'The Burras' at the 2016 Hockey Junior World Cup in India, where the team finished 4th.

In March 2018, Sharp was selected in the Australian national squad for the 2018 Commonwealth Games. The team won the gold medal, defeating New Zealand 2–0 in the final.

Sharp was selected in the Kookaburras Olympics squad for the Tokyo 2020 Olympics. The team reached the final for the first time since 2004 but couldn't achieve gold, beaten by Belgium in a shootout.
