= Jeremy Hayward =

Australian field hockey player

Personal information
- Full name: Jeremy Thomas Hayward
- Born: 3 March 1993 (age 33) Darwin, Northern Territory, Australia
- Height: 1.81 m (5 ft 11 in)
- Weight: 82 kg (181 lb)

Sport
- Sport: Field hockey
- Position: Defender
- Club: NT Stingers
National team
Years	Team	Caps	Goals
2014–	Australia	162	(70)
Medal record
Men's field hockey
Representing Australia
Olympic Games
Silver medal – second place	2020 Tokyo	Team
World Cup
Gold medal – first place	2014 The Hague
Bronze medal – third place	2018 Bhubaneswar
Commonwealth Games
Gold medal – first place	2018 Gold Coast	Team
Gold medal – first place	2022 Birmingham	Team
Champions Trophy
Gold medal – first place	2016 London
Gold medal – first place	2018 Breda
Bronze medal – third place	2014 Bhubaneswar
Oceania Cup
Gold medal – first place	2017 Sydney
Gold medal – first place	2019 Rockhampton
Gold medal – first place	2023 Whangārei
Gold medal – first place	2025 Darwin
FIH Pro League
Gold medal – first place	2019 Amstelveen
World League
Gold medal – first place	2014–15 Raipur
Gold medal – first place	2016–17 Bhubaneswar

Jeremy Thomas Hayward (born 3 March 1993) is an Australian field hockey player.

Hayward was part of the Australian team who won the 2014 Men's Hockey World Cup. The team defeated the Netherlands 6–1 in the final. Hayward was also awarded Young Player of the Tournament at this event.

Hayward was selected in the Kookaburras Olympics squad for the Tokyo 2020 Olympics. The team reached the final for the first time since 2004 but couldn't achieve gold, beaten by Belgium in a shootout.

Jeremy's brother Leon Hayward is a New Zealand field hockey player. The two competed against one another at the 2020 Tokyo Olympics.
