= Matt Dawson (field hockey) =

Australian field hockey player

Personal information
- Full name: Matthew Dawson
- Born: 27 April 1994 (age 32) Killarney Vale, New South Wales, Australia
- Height: 1.76 m (5 ft 9 in)
- Weight: 66 kg (146 lb)

Sport
- Sport: Field hockey
- Position: Defender
- Club: NSW Waratahs
National team
Years	Team	Caps	Goals
2014–	Australia	146	(12)
Medal record
Men's field hockey
Representing Australia
Olympic Games
Silver medal – second place	2020 Tokyo	Team
World Cup
Bronze medal – third place	2018 Bhubaneswar
Oceania Cup
Gold medal – first place	2015 Stratford
Gold medal – first place	2017 Sydney
Gold medal – first place	2019 Rockhampton
Gold medal – first place	2023 Whangārei
FIH Pro League
Gold medal – first place	2019 Amstelveen
Champions Trophy
Gold medal – first place	2016 London
Bronze medal – third place	2014 Bhubaneswar
Hockey World League
Gold medal – first place	2014–15 Raipur	Team
Gold medal – first place	2016–17 Bhubaneswar	Team
Commonwealth Games
Gold medal – first place	2018 Gold Coast	Team
Gold medal – first place	2022 Birmingham	Team

Matthew "Matt" Dawson (born 27 April 1994) is an Australian field hockey player who plays as a defender for the Australian national team. He competed at the 2016 and 2020 Olympic Games.

== Career ==
From Killarney Vale on the Central Coast region of New South Wales, Dawson is the son of former Australian cricketer Trish Dawson. He was first selected to play for the Australia men's national field hockey team in 2014 against India. He has since played in the 2014 and 2016 Champions Trophy. In 2015 he was signed by the Kalinga Lancers in the Hockey India League.

Dawson was selected in the Kookaburras Olympics squad for the Tokyo 2020 Olympics. The team reached the final for the first time since 2004 but couldn't achieve gold, beaten by Belgium in a shootout.

Selected for the 2024 Summer Olympics, he had part of a finger amputated just days before the Games in Paris began after sustaining an injury in training which, had he undergone surgery to repair it, would have meant missing the event.
