= 2003 Men's Australian Hockey League =

Tournament details
- Host country: Australia
- Dates: 1 March – 6 April
- Teams: 8
- Venue: 11 (in 11 host cities)

Final positions
- Champions: (Queensland) QLD Blades (1st title)
- Runner-up: (Western Australia) WA Thundersticks
- Third place: (New South Wales) NSW Panthers

Tournament statistics
- Matches played: 52
- Goals scored: 323 (6.21 per match)
- Top scorer(s): (Victoria (state)) Andrew Smith (Western Australia) Tristram Woodhouse (16 goals)
- Best player: (Tasmania) Matthew Wells

The 2003 Men's Australian Hockey League was the 12th edition of the men's field hockey tournament. The tournament was held in various cities across Australia, and was contested from 1 March through to 6 April 2003.

The QLD Blades won the title, defeating the WA Thundersticks 4–3 in the final. In the third place match, the NSW Panthers defeated the VIC Vikings 6–5 in golden goal extra time.

== Participating teams ==
- (South Australia) Adelaide Hotshots
- (Australian Capital Territory) Canberra Lakers
- (New South Wales) NSW Panthers
- (Queensland) QLD Blades
- (Tasmania) Tassie Tigers
- (Northern Territory) Territory Stingers
- (Victoria (state)) VIC Vikings
- (Western Australia) WA Thundersticks

== Competition format ==
The 2003 Men's Australian Hockey League consisted of a single round robin format, followed by classification matches.

Teams from all 8 states and territories competed against one another throughout the pool stage. At the conclusion of the pool stage, the top four ranked teams progressed to the semi-finals, while the bottom four teams continued to the classification stage.

The first four rounds of the pool stage comprised two-legged fixtures between states. As a result, matches in rounds five to seven of the pool stage were worth double points, due to the single-leg format.

=== Point allocation ===
Points
W	WD	LD	L
3	2	1	0

Every match in the 2003 AHL needed an outright result. In the event of a draw, golden goal extra time was played out, and if the result was still a draw a penalty shoot-out was contested, with the winner receiving a bonus point.

== Preliminary round ==
=== Pool ===
Pos	Team	Pld	W	WD	LD	L	GF	GA	GD	Pts	Qualification
1	(Western Australia) WA Thundersticks	11	10	0	1	0	48	21	+27	40	Semi-finals
2	(New South Wales) NSW Panthers	11	8	1	1	1	50	30	+20	33	Semi-finals
3	(Queensland) QLD Blades	11	6	1	0	4	35	26	+9	26	Semi-finals
4	(Victoria (state)) VIC Vikings	11	6	2	0	3	38	22	+16	22	Semi-finals
5	(Tasmania) Tassie Tigers	11	4	0	3	4	33	32	+1	21	Fifth to eighth place
6	(Australian Capital Territory) Canberra Lakers	11	4	1	0	6	32	44	−12	20	Fifth to eighth place
7	(Northern Territory) Territory Stingers	11	1	0	0	10	14	38	−24	6	Fifth to eighth place
8	(South Australia) Adelaide Hotshots	11	0	0	0	11	18	55	−37	0	Fifth to eighth place

Source: Hockey Australia
Rules for classification: 1) points; 2) goal difference; 3) matches won; 4) goals scored; 5) head-to-head result.

=== Fixtures ===
1 March 2003
15:00 (AEDT)

Tassie Tigers (Tasmania)	3–3 (a.e.t.)	(Victoria (state)) VIC Vikings
Richardson 6'; Guest 48'; Wright 67'	Report	Doerner 30'; Smith 45', 66'
Penalties
	3–1

Tasmanian Hockey Centre, Hobart

1 March 2003
16:00 (AEDT)

Canberra Lakers (Australian Capital Territory)	5–5 (a.e.t.)	(Western Australia) WA Thundersticks
Onitiri 28'; Stebbings 42'; Gilson 52'; M. Hotchkis 53'; MacKinnon 67'	Report	Woodhouse 34', 39', 40', 47'; Bolton 44'
Penalties
	5–4

National Hockey Centre, Canberra

1 March 2003
18:00 (ACDT)

Adelaide Hotshots (South Australia)	1–5	(Queensland) QLD Blades
Boland 4'	Report	Elder 10', 16', 28'; Eglington 19'; Dwyer 52'

Pines Hockey Stadium, Adelaide

1 March 2003
18:00 (ACST)

Territory Stingers (Northern Territory)	1–2	(New South Wales) NSW Panthers
D. Hennessy 38'	Report	Matheson 21'; Hogan 45'

Future Comms Hockey Centre, Darwin

2 March 2003
13:00 (ACDT)

Adelaide Hotshots (South Australia)	2–4	(Queensland) QLD Blades
Knight 29'; Schubert 43'	Report	Hammond 3', 10'; Elder 41', 65'

Pines Hockey Stadium, Adelaide

2 March 2003
14:00 (AEDT)

Tassie Tigers (Tasmania)	1–2 (a.e.t.)	(Victoria (state)) VIC Vikings
Stott 6'	Report	Vivian-Taylor 53'; Smith 77'

Tasmanian Hockey Centre, Hobart

2 March 2003
14:30 (AEDT)

Canberra Lakers (Australian Capital Territory)	1–4	(Western Australia) WA Thundersticks
Bishop 35'	Report	Regan 20', 33'; Woodhouse 21'; Gaudoin 48'

National Hockey Centre, Canberra

2 March 2003
18:00 (ACST)

Territory Stingers (Northern Territory)	0–4	(New South Wales) NSW Panthers
	Report	Harris 11'; Hogan 17'; Naylor 41'; Green 45'

Future Comms Hockey Centre, Darwin

7 March 2003
20:00 (ACST)

Territory Stingers (Northern Territory)	1–3	(Queensland) QLD Blades
Anstess 19'	Report	Butler 7'; Elder 10'; Bullion 65'

Future Comms Hockey Centre, Darwin

8 March 2003
13:00 (AEDT)

NSW Panthers (New South Wales)	6–5	(Australian Capital Territory) Canberra Lakers
McCann 47', 63'; Fibbins 53'; Harris 56'; Livermore 60'; Matheson 62'	Report	Judge 14', 24'; Stebbings 17'; M. Hotchkis 42'; MacKinnon 58'

Lithgow Hockey Stadium, Lithgow

8 March 2003
15:00 (ACDT)

Adelaide Hotshots (South Australia)	0–4	(Victoria (state)) VIC Vikings
	Report	T. Brooks 12'; Doerner 38'; J. Brooks 45'; Smith 54'

Pines Hockey Stadium, Adelaide

8 March 2003
18:00 (ACST)

Territory Stingers (Northern Territory)	2–5	(Queensland) QLD Blades
C. Hennessy 34'; Luck 52'	Report	Elder 7'; Hammond 38'; Eglington 46'; Butler 51'; Barry 57'

Future Comms Hockey Centre, Darwin

8 March 2003
19:00 (AWST)

WA Thundersticks (Western Australia)	3–1	(Tasmania) Tassie Tigers
McIntyre 12'; Galvin 41'; Bolton 57'	Report	Guest 20'

Perth Hockey Stadium, Perth

9 March 2003
15:00 (AEDT)

NSW Panthers (New South Wales)	7–2	(Australian Capital Territory) Canberra Lakers
Hogan 5'; Fibbins 34', 52', 63', 66'; McCann 54'; Livermore 58'	Report	Stebbings 5'; M. Hotchkis 15'

Lithgow Hockey Stadium, Lithgow

9 March 2003
15:00 (ACDT)

Adelaide Hotshots (South Australia)	0–3	(Victoria (state)) VIC Vikings
	Report	T. Brooks 6'; Doerner 22'; Smith 60'

Pines Hockey Stadium, Adelaide

9 March 2003
17:00 (AWST)

WA Thundersticks (Western Australia)	4–1	(Tasmania) Tassie Tigers
Gibson 14'; Woodhouse 18', 40'; Gaudoin 41'	Report	Tremayne 26'

Perth Hockey Stadium, Perth

14 March 2003
20:00 (AWST)

WA Thundersticks (Western Australia)	6–2	(Northern Territory) Territory Stingers
McIntyre 4'; Bolton 9'; S. Boyce 13'; Woodhouse 18'; Trigwell 56'; M. Boyce 68'	Report	C. Hennessy 22', 37'

Perth Hockey Stadium, Perth

15 March 2003
15:00 (AEDT)

VIC Vikings (Victoria (state))	4–3	(Australian Capital Territory) Canberra Lakers
McLennan 5'; J. Brooks 28'; Smith 51'; Ford 52'	Report	Gilson 17'; Z. Hawes 29', 54'

Albury Hockey Centre, Albury

15 March 2003
15:30 (AEDT)

Tassie Tigers (Tasmania)	5–1	(South Australia) Adelaide Hotshots
Sproule 5'; Close 37'; Marshall 47'; Guest 55'; Wright 70'	Report	Boland 47'

Tasmanian Hockey Centre, Hobart

15 March 2003
18:00 (AEST)

QLD Blades (Queensland)	2–4	(New South Wales) NSW Panthers
Bullion 29'; Elder 51'	Report	Livermore 4', 19'; Hogan 30'; McCann 53'

State Hockey Centre, Brisbane

15 March 2003
20:00 (AWST)

WA Thundersticks (Western Australia)	2–0	(Northern Territory) Territory Stingers
Woodhouse 3', 17'	Report

Perth Hockey Stadium, Perth

16 March 2003
13:30 (AEDT)

Tassie Tigers (Tasmania)	6–3	(South Australia) Adelaide Hotshots
Tremayne 2', 70'; Richardson 5'; Guest 35'; Stott 60'; Wells 67'	Report	Victory 27', 67'; Knight 66'

Tasmanian Hockey Centre, Hobart

16 March 2003
14:00 (AEST)

QLD Blades (Queensland)	5–4 (a.e.t.)	(New South Wales) NSW Panthers
Elder 5'; Dwyer 27', 48'; Clutton 52'; Eglington 78'	Report	Commens 39', 69'; McCann 61', 65'

State Hockey Centre, Brisbane

16 March 2003
15:00 (AEDT)

VIC Vikings (Victoria (state))	6–1	(Australian Capital Territory) Canberra Lakers
Smith 4', 11'; Doerner 32', 65'; McLennan 38'; Manos 45'	Report	Judge 44'

Albury Hockey Centre, Albury

22 March 2003
15:00 (AEDT)

VIC Vikings (Victoria (state))	2–0	(Northern Territory) Territory Stingers
Monte 3'; Vivian-Taylor 19'	Report

State Netball Hockey Centre, Melbourne

22 March 2003
15:00 (AEDT)

NSW Panthers (New South Wales)	5–2	(Tasmania) Tassie Tigers
Commens 23'; McCann 3', 39'; Hogan 32'; Fibbins 34'	Report	Wells 44'; Close 54'

Newcastle International Hockey Complex, Newcastle

22 March 2003
16:00 (AEDT)

Canberra Lakers (Australian Capital Territory)	6–3	(South Australia) Adelaide Hotshots
Z. Hawes 11', 34', 58'; Davidson 17'; Stebbings 21'; MacKinnon 40'	Report	Victory 23'; Boland 24'; Schubert 49'

National Hockey Centre, Canberra

22 March 2003
18:00 (AEST)

QLD Blades (Queensland)	2–4	(Western Australia) WA Thundersticks
Dwyer 43'; Eglington 44'	Report	Woodhouse 17'; Gaudoin 33', 60'; Gibson 40'

State Hockey Centre, Brisbane

23 March 2003
13:00 (AEDT)

NSW Panthers (New South Wales)	6–5 (a.e.t.)	(Tasmania) Tassie Tigers
McCann 44', 47'; Fibbins 52', 56', 70', 75'	Report	Wells 30', 58'; Close 32', 66'; Richardson 69'

Newcastle International Hockey Complex, Newcastle

23 March 2003
14:30 (AEDT)

Canberra Lakers (Australian Capital Territory)	3–2	(South Australia) Adelaide Hotshots
Stebbings 35'; Taylor 48'; Davidson 53'	Report	Victory 11'; Schubert 32'

National Hockey Centre, Canberra

23 March 2003
15:00 (AEST)

QLD Blades (Queensland)	0–2	(Western Australia) WA Thundersticks
	Report	M. Boyce 13'; S. Boyce 65'

State Hockey Centre, Brisbane

23 March 2003
15:00 (AEDT)

VIC Vikings (Victoria (state))	5–1	(Northern Territory) Territory Stingers
T. Brooks 4', 68'; Smith 13', 22', 65'	Report	Abbott 18'

State Netball Hockey Centre, Melbourne

31 March 2003
12:00 (AWST)

Canberra Lakers (Australian Capital Territory)	2–1	(Northern Territory) Territory Stingers
Judge 18', 60'	Report	C. Hennessy 15'

Perth Hockey Stadium, Perth

31 March 2003
14:00 (AWST)

QLD Blades (Queensland)	3–1	(Tasmania) Tassie Tigers
Elder 6'; Dwyer 15'; Bullion 58'	Report	Richardson 44'

Perth Hockey Stadium, Perth

31 March 2003
18:00 (AWST)

WA Thundersticks (Western Australia)	5–4	(Victoria (state)) VIC Vikings
Gaudoin 13'; McIntyre 32'; M. Boyce 43'; Gibson 47'; Hopkins 51'	Report	Ford 5'; Smith 15'; Vivian-Taylor 48'; Doerner 62'

Perth Hockey Stadium, Perth

31 March 2003
20:00 (AWST)

NSW Panthers (New South Wales)	5–1	(South Australia) Adelaide Hotshots
Hogan 1', 55'; Livermore 27', 43'; Naylor 53'	Report	Schubert 62'

Perth Hockey Stadium, Perth

1 April 2003
14:00 (AWST)

Territory Stingers (Northern Territory)	1–4	(Tasmania) Tassie Tigers
C. Hennessy 13'	Report	Wells 9'; Mitchell 45'; Guest 46'; Richardson 57'

Perth Hockey Stadium, Perth

1 April 2003
16:00 (AWST)

QLD Blades (Queensland)	2–3	(Australian Capital Territory) Canberra Lakers
Brown 13'; Dwyer 19'	Report	Z. Hawes 42'; Hotchkis 67'; Turner 69'

Perth Hockey Stadium, Perth

1 April 2003
18:00 (AWST)

WA Thundersticks (Western Australia)	9–2	(South Australia) Adelaide Hotshots
Gaudoin 7'; Hopkins 12'; McIntyre 15', 64'; S. Boyce 18', 52', 60'; Trigwell 42'; George 58'	Report	Stephen 57'; Knight 66'

Perth Hockey Stadium, Perth

1 April 2003
20:00 (AWST)

VIC Vikings (Victoria (state))	3–4	(New South Wales) NSW Panthers
T. Brooks 21'; Smith 29'; J. Brooks 49'	Report	Fibbins 6'; Harris 35'; McCann 44'; Livermore 59'

Perth Hockey Stadium, Perth

3 April 2003
12:00 (AWST)

Tassie Tigers (Tasmania)	4–1	(Australian Capital Territory) Canberra Lakers
Richardson 9'; Close 39'; Mitchell 40', 60'	Report	Bishop 15'

Perth Hockey Stadium, Perth

3 April 2003
14:00 (AWST)

Adelaide Hotshots (South Australia)	3–5	(Northern Territory) Territory Stingers
Schubert 6'; Victory 10'; Lee 39'	Report	Clarke 26'; D. Hennessy 43', 47', 48', 50'

Perth Hockey Stadium, Perth

3 April 2003
18:00 (AWST)

NSW Panthers (New South Wales)	3–4	(Western Australia) WA Thundersticks
Livermore 42', 62'; McCann 63'	Report	Galvin 15'; Woodhouse 20', 70'; Gibson 29'

Perth Hockey Stadium, Perth

3 April 2003
18:00 (AWST)

VIC Vikings (Victoria (state))	2–4	(Queensland) QLD Blades
Smith 22', 37'	Report	Dwyer 2', 51'; Eglington 28'; Elder 70'

Perth Hockey Stadium, Perth

== Classification round ==
=== Bracket ===
Crossover
5 April 2003
(Tasmania) Tassie Tigers	4
(South Australia) Adelaide Hotshots	2
5 April 2003
(Australian Capital Territory) Canberra Lakers	5
(Northern Territory) Territory Stingers	0

Fifth place
6 April 2003
(Tasmania) Tassie Tigers	5
(Australian Capital Territory) Canberra Lakers	3
Seventh place
6 April 2003
(South Australia) Adelaide Hotshots	1
(Northern Territory) Territory Stingers	3

=== Crossover ===
5 April 2003
09:00 (AWST)

Tassie Tigers (Tasmania)	4–2	(South Australia) Adelaide Hotshots
Wells 28', 50'; Mitchell 38'; Close 56'	Report	Victory 43'; Lee 40'

Perth Hockey Stadium, Perth

5 April 2003
09:30 (AWST)

Canberra Lakers (Australian Capital Territory)	5–0	(Northern Territory) Territory Stingers
J. Hawes 4'; Chessell 28'; MacKinnon 48'; Judge 57'; Davidson 68'	Report

Perth Hockey Stadium, Perth

=== Seventh and eighth place ===
6 April 2003
09:00 (AWST)

Adelaide Hotshots (South Australia)	1–3	(Northern Territory) Territory Stingers
Dry 62'	Report	Moodie 2'; D. Hennessy 41', 68'

Perth Hockey Stadium, Perth

=== Fifth and sixth place ===
6 April 2003
08:30 (AWST)

Tassie Tigers (Tasmania)	5–3	(Australian Capital Territory) Canberra Lakers
Close 4'; Marshall 16', 20'; Murgatroyd 26'; Stott 62'	Report	Judge 40', 42', 55'

Perth Hockey Stadium, Perth

== Medal round ==
=== Bracket ===
Semi-finals
5 April 2003
(Western Australia) WA Thundersticks	7
(Victoria (state)) VIC Vikings	2
5 April 2003
(New South Wales) NSW Panthers	1
(Queensland) QLD Blades	4

Final
6 April 2003
(Western Australia) WA Thundersticks	3
(Queensland) QLD Blades	4
Third place
6 April 2003
(Victoria (state)) VIC Vikings	5
(New South Wales) NSW Panthers (a.e.t)	6

=== Semi-finals ===
5 April 2003
11:00 (AWST)

WA Thundersticks (Western Australia)	7–2	(Victoria (state)) VIC Vikings
Woodhouse 16', 51'; Hopkins 22', 31'; Galvin 53', 65'; S. Boyce 69'	Report	McLennan 9'; Smith 14'

Perth Hockey Stadium, Perth

5 April 2003
13:00 (AWST)

NSW Panthers (New South Wales)	1–4	(Queensland) QLD Blades
Harris 63'	Report	Brown 13', 46'; Bullion 21'; Eglington 52'

Perth Hockey Stadium, Perth

=== Third and fourth place ===
6 April 2003
10:30 (AWST)

VIC Vikings (Victoria (state))	5–6 (a.e.t.)	(New South Wales) NSW Panthers
Ford 8'; Geraghty 18', 61'; Vivian-Taylor 70'; J. Brooks 70'	Report	Naylor 7'; Booth 13', 42'; McCann 18', 79'; Fletcher 50'

Perth Hockey Stadium, Perth

=== Final ===
6 April 2003
12:30 (AWST)

WA Thundersticks (Western Australia)	3–4	(Queensland) QLD Blades
Woodhouse 16'; Bolton 37'; Gaudoin 54'	Report	Elder 24', 29', 39'; Eglington 54'

Perth Hockey Stadium, Perth

== Awards ==
The following awards were presented at the conclusion of the tournament.

Top Goalscorer	Player of the League	Player of the Final
(Victoria (state)) Andrew Smith (Western Australia) Tristram Woodhouse	(Tasmania) Matthew Wells	(Queensland) Dean Butler

== Final standings ==
Pos	Team	Pld	W	WD	LD	L	GF	GA	GD	Pts	Qualification
1st place, gold medalist(s)	(Queensland) QLD Blades	13	8	1	0	4	43	30	+13	32	Gold Medal
2nd place, silver medalist(s)	(Western Australia) WA Thundersticks	13	11	0	1	1	58	27	+31	43	Silver Medal
3rd place, bronze medalist(s)	(New South Wales) NSW Panthers	13	8	2	1	2	57	39	+18	35	Bronze Medal
4	(Victoria (state)) VIC Vikings	13	6	2	1	4	45	35	+10	23	
5	(Tasmania) Tassie Tigers	13	6	0	3	4	42	37	+5	27	
6	(Australian Capital Territory) Canberra Lakers	13	5	1	0	7	40	49	−9	23	
7	(Northern Territory) Territory Stingers	13	2	0	0	11	17	44	−27	9	
8	(South Australia) Adelaide Hotshots	13	0	0	0	13	21	62	−41	0	

Source: Clearing House

== Goalscorers ==
There were 323 goals scored in 52 matches, for an average of 6.21 goals per match.

16 goals

- (Victoria (state)) Andrew Smith
- (Western Australia) Tristram Woodhouse

14 goals

- (New South Wales) Michael McCann
- (Queensland) Troy Elder

11 goals

- (New South Wales) David Fibbins

9 goals

- (Australian Capital Territory) Lucas Judge
- (New South Wales) Brent Livermore

8 goals

- (Queensland) Jamie Dwyer

7 goals

- (New South Wales) Michael Hogan
- (Queensland) Nathan Eglington
- (Tasmania) Oliver Close
- (Tasmania) Matthew Wells
- (Northern Territory) David Hennessy
- (Western Australia) Paul Gaudoin

6 goals

- (South Australia) Craig Victory
- (Australian Capital Territory) Zachary Hawes
- (Tasmania) Marcus Richardson
- (Victoria (state)) Luke Doerner
- (Western Australia) Steven Boyce

5 goals

- (South Australia) Grant Schubert
- (Australian Capital Territory) Jonathan Stebbings
- (Tasmania) David Guest
- (Northern Territory) Colin Hennessy
- (Victoria (state)) Travis Brooks
- (Western Australia) Murray McIntyre

4 goals

- (Australian Capital Territory) Matthew Hotchkis
- (Australian Capital Territory) Paul MacKinnon
- (New South Wales) Mark Harris
- (Queensland) Steven Bullion
- (Tasmania) David Mitchell
- (Victoria (state)) Jason Brooks
- (Victoria (state)) Lachlan Vivian-Taylor
- (Western Australia) Guy Bolton
- (Western Australia) David Galvin
- (Western Australia) Richard Gibson
- (Western Australia) Aaron Hopkins

3 goals

- (South Australia) Evan Boland
- (South Australia) Tasman Knight
- (Australian Capital Territory) Iain Davidson
- (New South Wales) Adam Commens
- (New South Wales) Matthew Naylor
- (Queensland) Blair Brown
- (Queensland) Robert Hammond
- (Tasmania) Phillip Marshall
- (Tasmania) Niall Stott
- (Tasmania) Nicholas Tremayne
- (Victoria (state)) Russell Ford
- (Victoria (state)) Alistair McLennan
- (Western Australia) Michael Boyce

2 goals

- (South Australia) Matthew Lee
- (Australian Capital Territory) Benjamin Bishop
- (Australian Capital Territory) Evan Gilson
- (New South Wales) Brendan Booth
- (New South Wales) Eli Matheson
- (Queensland) Dean Butler
- (Tasmania) Zain Wright
- (Victoria (state)) Declan Geraghty
- (Western Australia) Matthew Regan
- (Western Australia) Daniel Trigwell

1 goal

- (South Australia) Joel Dry
- (South Australia) Dale Stephen
- (Australian Capital Territory) Charlie Chessell
- (Australian Capital Territory) Joshua Hawes
- (Australian Capital Territory) Seyi Onitiri
- (Australian Capital Territory) Benjamin Taylor
- (Australian Capital Territory) Glenn Turner
- (New South Wales) Stuart Fletcher
- (New South Wales) Robert Green
- (Queensland) Wayne Barry
- (Queensland) George Clutton
- (Tasmania) Tony Murgatroyd
- (Tasmania) Daniel Sproule
- (Northern Territory) Desmond Abbott
- (Northern Territory) Gregory Anstess
- (Northern Territory) Robert Clarke
- (Northern Territory) Rhys Luck
- (Northern Territory) Graham Moodie
- (Victoria (state)) Jason Manos
- (Victoria (state)) Andrew Monte
- (Western Australia) Bevan George
