= 2002 Men's Australian Hockey League =

Tournament details
- Host country: Australia
- Dates: 9 March – 21 April
- Teams: 8
- Venue: 8 (in 8 host cities)

Final positions
- Champions: (Western Australia) WA Thundersticks (6th title)
- Runner-up: (Queensland) QLD Blades
- Third place: (Victoria (state)) VIC Vikings

Tournament statistics
- Matches played: 52
- Top scorer: (Victoria (state)) Andrew Smith (23 goals)
- Best player: (Tasmania) Zain Wright

The 2002 Men's Australian Hockey League was the 11th edition of Hockey Australia's premier domestic competition, and the first under the Australian Hockey League name. The tournament was held across various cities in Australia, from 9 March to 21 April 2002.

The WA Thundersticks won their sixth title, defeating the QLD Blades 4–1 in the final.

== Participating teams ==
Teams from each of Australia's eight states and territories competed in the league.

- (South Australia) Adelaide Hotshots
- (Australian Capital Territory) Canberra Lakers
- (New South Wales) NSW Panthers
- (Queensland) QLD Blades
- (Tasmania) Tassie Tigers
- (Northern Territory) Territory Stingers
- (Victoria (state)) VIC Vikings
- (Western Australia) WA Thundersticks

== Preliminary round ==
=== Pool ===
Pos	Team	Pld	W	WD	LD	L	GF	GA	GD	Pts	Qualification
1	(Queensland) QLD Blades	11	8	2	0	1	64	25	+39	36	Medal round
2	(New South Wales) NSW Panthers	11	6	1	0	4	34	36	−2	28	Medal round
3	(Western Australia) WA Thundersticks	11	7	0	2	2	44	31	+13	27	Medal round
4	(Victoria (state)) VIC Vikings	11	7	0	0	4	51	31	+20	24	Medal round
5	(Tasmania) Tassie Tigers	11	6	0	0	5	33	36	−3	24	Classification round
6	(Australian Capital Territory) Canberra Lakers	11	6	0	1	4	34	26	+8	23	Classification round
7	(South Australia) Adelaide Hotshots	11	1	0	0	10	23	56	−33	6	Classification round
8	(Northern Territory) Territory Stingers	11	0	0	0	11	9	51	−42	0	Classification round

Source: Hockey Australia

=== Fixtures ===
9 March 2002
15:00 (ACDT)

Adelaide Hotshots (South Australia)	4–5	(Western Australia) WA Thundersticks
Schubert 26', 38', 59'; Knight 50'	Report	Lynn 2'; McIntyre 34'; Woodhouse 43'; Wishart 48', 63'

Pines Hockey Stadium, Adelaide

9 March 2002
16:00 (AEST)

QLD Blades (Queensland)	4–2	(Tasmania) Tassie Tigers
O'Shea 28', 38'; Knowles 54'; Brennan 68'	Report	Bent 4'; Close 51'

Queensland State Hockey Centre, Brisbane

9 March 2002
18:00 (AEDT)

Canberra Lakers (Australian Capital Territory)	3–2	(Victoria (state)) VIC Vikings
Stebbings 23', 50'; Judge 49'	Report	Stacy 39'; Duff 47'

National Hockey Centre, Canberra

9 March 2002
18:00 (ACST)

Territory Stingers (Northern Territory)	2–6	(New South Wales) NSW Panthers
Butcher 32'; Lenoir 70'	Report	Harris 4'; Taylor 32', 49', 52'; King 68'

Marrarra Hockey Centre, Darwin

10 March 2002
14:00 (AEST)

QLD Blades (Queensland)	9–3	(Tasmania) Tassie Tigers
O'Shea 6'; Hammond 17'; Eglington 23', 39'; Brennan 27', 47', 60', 62'; Bisley 30'	Report	Page 15', 54'; Guest 66'

Queensland State Hockey Centre, Brisbane

10 March 2002
15:00 (ACDT)

Adelaide Hotshots (South Australia)	1–5	(Western Australia) WA Thundersticks
Lee 66'	Report	Lynn 5'; Bolton 13'; Gibson 52'; Woodhouse 63', 66'

Pines Hockey Stadium, Adelaide

10 March 2002
16:00 (AEDT)

Canberra Lakers (Australian Capital Territory)	2–4	(Victoria (state)) VIC Vikings
Gilson 28'; Judge 46'	Report	Smith 7'; Stacy 17'; Duff 33'; Dawson 54'

National Hockey Centre, Canberra

10 March 2002
20:00 (ACST)

Territory Stingers (Northern Territory)	0–7	(New South Wales) NSW Panthers
	Report	Harris 21', 41'; Charlton 26'; Naylor 59'; Mulcair 63'

Marrarra Hockey Centre, Darwin

16 March 2002
15:00 (AEDT)

NSW Panthers (New South Wales)	1–0	(Australian Capital Territory) Canberra Lakers
Naylor 59'	Report

Bathurst Hockey Centre, Bathurst

16 March 2002
15:00 (ACDT)

Adelaide Hotshots (South Australia)	0–3	(Tasmania) Tassie Tigers
	Report	Shaw 7', 59'; Close 18'

Pines Hockey Stadium, Adelaide

16 March 2002
18:00 (ACST)

Territory Stingers (Northern Territory)	0–3	(Victoria (state)) VIC Vikings
	Report	Smith 5'; Dawson 24'; J. Brooks 38'

Marrarra Hockey Centre, Darwin

16 March 2002
19:00 (AWST)

WA Thundersticks (Western Australia)	4–5 (a.e.t.)	(Queensland) QLD Blades
McIntyre 21'; Wishart 35'; M. Boyce 64'; Bolton 70'	Report	O'Shea 23'; Brown 27', 36'; Brennan 34', 75'

Perth Hockey Stadium, Perth

17 March 2002
13:00 (AEDT)

NSW Panthers (New South Wales)	2–6	(Australian Capital Territory) Canberra Lakers
Taylor 45'	Report	Stebbings 7'; Z. Hawes 17', 24'; Judge 35'; Taylor 38'; L. MacKinnon 50'

Bathurst Hockey Centre, Bathurst

17 March 2002
15:00 (ACDT)

Adelaide Hotshots (South Australia)	2–4	(Tasmania) Tassie Tigers
Stephen 27'; Korcz 37'	Report	Shaw 9', 20', 50'; Page 31'

Pines Hockey Stadium, Adelaide

17 March 2002
17:00 (AWST)

WA Thundersticks (Western Australia)	3–2	(Queensland) QLD Blades
Woodhouse 10'; Gibson 27'; Lynn 32'	Report	Brown 44'; Eglington 70'

Perth Hockey Stadium, Perth

17 March 2002
20:00 (ACST)

Territory Stingers (Northern Territory)	0–5	(Victoria (state)) VIC Vikings
	Report	T. Brooks 4'; Smith 10'; Ford 39'; Duff 55'; Dawson 63'

Marrarra Hockey Centre, Darwin

22 March 2002
19:00 (AEDT)

Tassie Tigers (Tasmania)	6–2	(Northern Territory) Territory Stingers
Shaw 6'; Burrows 54'; Richardson 57'; Close 64'	Report	D. Hennessy 2'; O'Brien 14'

Tasmanian Hockey Centre, Hobart

23 March 2002
15:00 (AEDT)

NSW Panthers (New South Wales)	1–7	(Queensland) QLD Blades

Olympic Hockey Centre, Sydney

23 March 2002
15:00 (AEDT)

VIC Vikings (Victoria (state))	8–2	(South Australia) Adelaide Hotshots

Victorian State Hockey Centre, Melbourne

23 March 2002
18:00 (AEDT)

Tassie Tigers (Tasmania)	4–2	(Northern Territory) Territory Stingers
Guest 45'; Burrows 60'; Page 66'; Close 69'	Report	O'Brien 17', 48'

Tasmanian Hockey Centre, Hobart

23 March 2002
19:00 (AWST)

WA Thundersticks (Western Australia)	2–0	(Australian Capital Territory) Canberra Lakers
Bolton 13'; Tobita 68'	Report

Perth Hockey Stadium, Perth

24 March 2002
13:00 (AEDT)

NSW Panthers (New South Wales)	2–8	(Queensland) QLD Blades

Olympic Hockey Centre, Sydney

24 March 2002
15:00 (AEDT)

VIC Vikings (Victoria (state))	7–3	(South Australia) Adelaide Hotshots
Ford 1'; Smith 29', 33', 52', 66', 69', 70'	Report	Knight 5'; Schiller 8', 67'

Victorian State Hockey Centre, Melbourne

24 March 2002
17:00 (AWST)

WA Thundersticks (Western Australia)	4–5	(Australian Capital Territory) Canberra Lakers
Tobita 28'; Wishart 38'; Woodhouse 58'; M. Boyce 68'	Report	L. MacKinnon 2'; Judge 23', 24', 60'; J. Hawes 60'

Perth Hockey Stadium, Perth

5 April 2002
18:00 (AEST)

Canberra Lakers (Australian Capital Territory)	4–0	(Northern Territory) Territory Stingers
Judge 11'; Bishop 12'; Stebbings 38'; Z. Hawes 70'	Report

National Hockey Centre, Canberra

6 April 2002
14:00 (AEST)

QLD Blades (Queensland)	9–2	(South Australia) Adelaide Hotshots
Brown 12', 35'; Dwyer 15', 40', 41', 48'; Eglington 15'; Bisley 43', 70'	Report	Stephen 42'; Victory 54'

Queensland State Hockey Centre, Brisbane

6 April 2002
14:00 (AEST)

VIC Vikings (Victoria (state))	3–4	(New South Wales) NSW Panthers
Thompson 2'; Smith 16', 64'	Report	Taylor 35', 47'; Commens 37'; Smith 68'

Victorian State Hockey Centre, Melbourne

6 April 2002
15:00 (AEST)

Tassie Tigers (Tasmania)	3–8	(Western Australia) WA Thundersticks
Burrows 23', 42'; Shaw 64'	Report	Gaudoin 21'; Davison 27'; Lee 41'; Bolton 46'; Woodhouse 49', 52', 56', 69'

Tasmanian Hockey Centre, Hobart

6 April 2002
17:00 (AEST)

Canberra Lakers (Australian Capital Territory)	4–3	(Northern Territory) Territory Stingers
Dawson 14'; Stebbings 21', 37'; Archibald 50'	Report	C. Hennessy 23'; McDonald 55'; D. Hennessy 58'

National Hockey Centre, Canberra

7 April 2002
13:30 (AEST)

Tassie Tigers (Tasmania)	1–2	(Western Australia) WA Thundersticks
Burrows 55'	Report	Bolton 26'; Hopkins 29'

Tasmanian Hockey Centre, Hobart

7 April 2002
14:00 (AEST)

QLD Blades (Queensland)	6–2	(South Australia) Adelaide Hotshots

Queensland State Hockey Centre, Brisbane

7 April 2002
14:00 (AEST)

VIC Vikings (Victoria (state))	6–2	(New South Wales) NSW Panthers
Smith 8', 54', 55'; Dawson 17'; T. Brooks 39'; Duff 45'	Report	Taylor 47'; Smith 70'

Victorian State Hockey Centre, Melbourne

15 April 2002
09:00 (AEST)

NSW Panthers (New South Wales)	4–2	(South Australia) Adelaide Hotshots
Smith 15'; Taylor 34', 45'; Naylor 69'	Report	Stephen 10'; Schubert 37'

Victorian State Hockey Centre, Melbourne

15 April 2002
11:00 (AEST)

Territory Stingers (Northern Territory)	0–6	(Western Australia) WA Thundersticks
	Report	Woodhouse 16', 29', 68'; George 17'; Gaudoin 27'; McIntyre 31'

Victorian State Hockey Centre, Melbourne

15 April 2002
13:00 (AEST)

QLD Blades (Queensland)	8–3	(Victoria (state)) VIC Vikings
Elder 14', 31'; Dwyer 27'; O'Shea 29', 57', 63'; Eglington 35', 58'	Report	Hiskins 29'; Smith 43', 49'

Victorian State Hockey Centre, Melbourne

15 April 2002
15:00 (AEST)

Canberra Lakers (Australian Capital Territory)	2–3	(Tasmania) Tassie Tigers
Z. Hawes 5'; Judge 46'	Report	Shaw 17', 44'; Close 67'

Victorian State Hockey Centre, Melbourne

16 April 2002
09:00 (AEST)

WA Thundersticks (Western Australia)	2–3 (a.e.t.)	(New South Wales) NSW Panthers
Gaudoin 32'; Bolton 38'	Report	McCann 27', 54'; Gilbert 72'

Victorian State Hockey Centre, Melbourne

16 April 2002
11:00 (AEST)

Adelaide Hotshots (South Australia)	4–0	(Northern Territory) Territory Stingers
Victory 14'; Schubert 21'; Schiller 52'; Lee 21'	Report

Victorian State Hockey Centre, Melbourne

16 April 2002
13:00 (AEST)

QLD Blades (Queensland)	4–3 (a.e.t.)	(Australian Capital Territory) Canberra Lakers
Dwyer 17'; Elder 52', 74'; De Young 53'	Report	Z. Hawes 8'; J. Hawes 16'; Taylor 60'

Victorian State Hockey Centre, Melbourne

16 April 2002
15:00 (AEST)

VIC Vikings (Victoria (state))	3–4	(Tasmania) Tassie Tigers
Smith 33'; McLennan 35'; Hiskins 54'	Report	Burrows 5', 44'; Shaw 26'; Wells 57'

Victorian State Hockey Centre, Melbourne

18 April 2002
09:00 (AEST)

Adelaide Hotshots (South Australia)	1–5	(Australian Capital Territory) Canberra Lakers
Knight 56'	Report	Turner 12'; Bishop 26'; Z. Hawes 54'; Paul MacKinnon 56', 62'

Victorian State Hockey Centre, Melbourne

18 April 2002
11:00 (AEST)

Territory Stingers (Northern Territory)	0–2	(Queensland) QLD Blades
	Report	Dwyer 14'; Elder 14'

Victorian State Hockey Centre, Melbourne

18 April 2002
13:00 (AEST)

Tassie Tigers (Tasmania)	0–2	(New South Wales) NSW Panthers
	Report	Smith 2', 32'

Victorian State Hockey Centre, Melbourne

18 April 2002
15:00 (AEST)

VIC Vikings (Victoria (state))	7–3	(Western Australia) WA Thundersticks
T. Brooks 2'; McLennan 5', 8', 46'; Hiskins 29'; Smith 32', 48'	Report	Bolton 21'; Webster 59', 70'

Victorian State Hockey Centre, Melbourne

== Classification round ==
=== Bracket ===
Crossovers
20 April
(Tasmania) Tassie Tigers	8
(Northern Territory) Territory Stingers	2
20 April
(Australian Capital Territory) Canberra Lakers	7
(South Australia) Adelaide Hotshots	2

Fifth place
21 April
(Tasmania) Tassie Tigers (a.e.t)	4
(Australian Capital Territory) Canberra Lakers	3
Seventh place
21 April
(Northern Territory) Territory Stingers (a.e.t)	2
(South Australia) Adelaide Hotshots	1

=== Crossovers ===
20 April 2002
08:30 (AEST)

Tassie Tigers (Tasmania)	8–2	(Northern Territory) Territory Stingers
Shaw 4', 50'; Bent 11'; Hawson 20'; Burrows 25'; Lucas 41'; Poke 59'; Woolford 69'	Report	Keirs 54'; Lenoir 65'

Victorian State Hockey Centre, Melbourne

20 April 2002
10:30 (AEST)

Canberra Lakers (Australian Capital Territory)	7–2	(South Australia) Adelaide Hotshots
Dawson 11'; J. Hawes 14'; L. MacKinnon 22', 40', 69'; Archibald 26'; Bishop 65'	Report	Stephen 43'; Victory 55'

Victorian State Hockey Centre, Melbourne

=== Seventh and eighth place ===
21 April 2002
09:00 (AEST)

Territory Stingers (Northern Territory)	2–1 (a.e.t.)	(South Australia) Adelaide Hotshots
D. Hennessy 25'; O'Brien 80'	Report	Korcz 23'

Victorian State Hockey Centre, Melbourne

=== Fifth and sixth place ===
21 April 2002
11:00 (AEST)

Tassie Tigers (Tasmania)	4–3 (a.e.t.)	(Australian Capital Territory) Canberra Lakers
Burrows 17', 51', 73'; Shaw 39'	Report	Bishop 4'; Stebbings 44'; Z. Hawes 55'

Victorian State Hockey Centre, Melbourne

== Medal round ==
=== Bracket ===
Semi-finals
20 April
(Queensland) QLD Blades	5
(Victoria (state)) VIC Vikings	2
20 April
(New South Wales) NSW Panthers	1
(Western Australia) WA Thundersticks	3

Final
21 April
(Queensland) QLD Blades	1
(Western Australia) Perth Thundersticks	4
Third place
21 April
(Victoria (state)) VIC Vikings	5
(New South Wales) NSW Panthers	1

=== Semi-finals ===
20 April 2002
12:30 (AEST)

QLD Blades (Queensland)	5–2	(Victoria (state)) VIC Vikings
Eglington 3'; Dwyer 6', 37'; Elder 54', 59'	Report	Hiskins 29'; Smith 40'

Victorian State Hockey Centre, Melbourne

20 April 2002
14:30 (AEST)

NSW Panthers (New South Wales)	1–3	(Western Australia) WA Thundersticks
Taylor 12'	Report	Gaudoin 16'; Davison 31', 64'

Victorian State Hockey Centre, Melbourne

=== Third and fourth place ===
21 April 2002
13:00 (AEST)

VIC Vikings (Victoria (state))	5–1	(New South Wales) NSW Panthers
Hiskins 8', 15', 52'; Duff 10'; Ford 47'	Report	Smith 53'

Victorian State Hockey Centre, Melbourne

=== Final ===
21 April 2002
15:00 (AEST)

QLD Blades (Queensland)	1–4	(Western Australia) WA Thundersticks
Brennan 69'	Report	Woodhouse 33'; Webster 59', 66'; McIntyre 61'

Victorian State Hockey Centre, Melbourne
