= 2014 Men's Australian Hockey League =

Tournament details
- Host country: Australia
- City: Adelaide
- Dates: 4–11 October 2014
- Teams: 8
- Venue(s): State Hockey Centre

Final positions
- Champions: (Tasmania) Tassie Tigers (1st title)
- Runner-up: (Western Australia) WA Thundersticks
- Third place: (Victoria (state)) Victorian Vikings

Tournament statistics
- Matches played: 24
- Goals scored: 134 (5.58 per match)
- Top scorer(s): (New South Wales) Blake Govers (9 goals)
- Best player: (Tasmania) Eddie Ockenden

The 2014 Men's Australian Hockey League was the 24th edition of the Australian Hockey League men's Field Hockey tournament. The tournament was held in the South Australia city of Adelaide.

Tassie Tigers won the gold medal for the first time by defeating the WA Thundersticks 3–2 in a penalty shoot-out after a 2–2 draw. The VIC Vikings won the bronze medal for the first time by defeating the QLD Blades 4–2 in a penalty shoot-out after a 4–4 draw.

== Competition format ==
The tournament is divided into two pools, Pool A and Pool B, consisting of four teams in a round-robin format. Teams then progress into either Pool C, the medal round, or Pool D, the classification round. Teams carry over points from their previous match ups, and contest teams they are yet to play.

The top two teams in pools A and B progress to Pool C. The top two teams in Pool C continue to contest the Final, while the bottom two teams of Pool C play in the Third and Fourth-place match.

The remaining bottom placing teams make up Pool D. The top two teams in Pool D play in the Fifth and Sixth-place match, while the bottom two teams of Pool C play in the Seventh and Eighth-place match.

== Teams ==
- (Australian Capital Territory) Canberra Lakers
- (New South Wales) NSW Waratahs
- (Northern Territory) NT Stingers
- (Queensland) QLD Blades
- (South Australia) SA Hotshots
- (Tasmania) Tassie Tigers
- (Victoria (state)) VIC Vikings
- (Western Australia) WA Thundersticks

== Results ==
=== First round ===
==== Pool A ====
Pos	Team	Pld	W	D	L	GF	GA	GD	Pts	Qualification
1	(Tasmania) Tassie Tigers	3	2	1	0	7	4	+3	7	Advance to Medal Round
2	(Queensland) QLD Blades	3	1	1	1	7	7	0	4	Advance to Medal Round
3	(Australian Capital Territory) Canberra Lakers	3	1	0	2	8	9	−1	3	
4	(South Australia) SA Hotshots	3	0	2	1	8	10	−2	2	

Source: Hockey Australia

4 October 2014
13:30

QLD Blades (Queensland)	4–3	(Australian Capital Territory) Canberra Lakers
Whetton 19', 25'; Wotherspoon 47'; Douglas 55'	Report	Turner 13'; M. Hotchkis 28'; Kershaw 34'

State Hockey Centre
Umpires:
Tim Pullman
Glen Munday

4 October 2014
17:30

Tassie Tigers (Tasmania)	3–3	(South Australia) SA Hotshots
Ancher 39'; Middleton 55'; McCambridge 60'	Report	Bowden 3', 27'; Oliver 15'

State Hockey Centre
Umpires:
Michael McLean
Adam Barry

5 October 2014
13:30

QLD Blades (Queensland)	0–1	(Tasmania) Tassie Tigers
	Report	Arthur 12'

State Hockey Centre
Umpires:
Jeremy Coleman
Murray Grime

5 October 2014
17:30

Canberra Lakers (Australian Capital Territory)	4–2	(South Australia) SA Hotshots
D. Hotchkis 1'; M. Hotchkis 17'; Kershaw 30'; Baxter 50'	Report	Oliver 8'; Child 42'

State Hockey Centre
Umpires:
Zeke Newman
Glen Munday

7 October 2014
13:30

Canberra Lakers (Australian Capital Territory)	1–3	(Tasmania) Tassie Tigers
D. Hotchkis 57'	Report	Cock 20'; McCambridge 29'; Arthur 43'

State Hockey Centre
Umpires:
Zeke Newman
Murray Grime

7 October 2014
17:30

QLD Blades (Queensland)	3–3	(South Australia) SA Hotshots
Reardon 24'; Wotherspoon 38'; Whetton 45'	Report	Claxton 48'; Tamlin 57'; Oliver 60'

State Hockey Centre
Umpires:
Scott Embry
Stephen Versteegh

==== Pool B ====
Pos	Team	Pld	W	D	L	GF	GA	GD	Pts	Qualification
1	(Victoria (state)) VIC Vikings	3	3	0	0	11	4	+7	9	Advance to Medal Round
2	(Western Australia) WA Thundersticks	3	2	0	1	6	4	+2	6	Advance to Medal Round
3	(New South Wales) NSW Waratahs	3	1	0	2	6	10	−4	3	
4	(Northern Territory) NT Stingers	3	0	0	3	4	9	−5	0	

Source: Hockey Australia

4 October 2014
15:30

VIC Vikings (Victoria (state))	6–2	(New South Wales) NSW Waratahs
Zull 5'; McLennan 10'; Webster 16'; Ciriello 23', 57'; Mirecki 49'	Report	Govers 21', 37'

State Hockey Centre
Umpires:
Stephen Rogers
Murray Grime

4 October 2014
19:30

NT Stingers (Northern Territory)	1–3	(Western Australia) WA Thundersticks
J. Hayward 59'	Report	Zalewski 19'; Bausor 31'; Boyne 50'

State Hockey Centre
Umpires:
Levi Stephen
Stephen Versteegh

5 October 2014
15:30

VIC Vikings (Victoria (state))	4–2	(Northern Territory) NT Stingers
Ford 14'; Ciriello 26', 46'; Cross 34'	Report	Haami-Jones 10'; A. Lockley 35'

State Hockey Centre
Umpires:
Stephen Rogers
Scott Embry

5 October 2014
19:30

NSW Waratahs (New South Wales)	2–3	(Western Australia) WA Thundersticks
Hayes 11'; Govers 19'	Report	Boyne 6'; Bausor 12'; Ashford 51'

State Hockey Centre
Umpires:
Tim Pullman
Levi Stephen

7 October 2014
15:30

VIC Vikings (Victoria (state))	1–0	(Western Australia) WA Thundersticks
Pollard 34'	Report

State Hockey Centre
Umpires:
Adam Barry
Tim Pullman

7 October 2014
19:30

NSW Waratahs (New South Wales)	2–1	(Northern Territory) NT Stingers
Walters 3'; Dawson 38'	Report	J. Hayward 38'

State Hockey Centre
Umpires:
Michael McLean
Jeremy Coleman

=== Second round ===
==== Pool C (Medal Round) ====
Pos	Team	Pld	W	D	L	GF	GA	GD	Pts
1	(Western Australia) WA Thundersticks	3	2	0	1	8	3	+5	6
2	(Tasmania) Tassie Tigers	3	2	0	1	7	8	−1	6
3	(Victoria (state)) VIC Vikings	3	1	1	1	7	8	−1	4
4	(Queensland) QLD Blades	3	0	1	2	4	7	−3	1

Source: Hockey Australia

8 October 2014
17:30

QLD Blades (Queensland)	1–3	(Western Australia) WA Thundersticks
Wotherspoon 5'	Report	Bausor 40'; Mitton 48', 50'

State Hockey Centre
Umpires:
Stephen Versteegh
Tim Pullman

8 October 2014
19:30

Tassie Tigers (Tasmania)	5–3	(Victoria (state)) VIC Vikings
Ancher 13', 53'; McCambridge 14'; Edwards 35'; Ockenden 43'	Report	Seccull 18'; Pollard 38'; Ciriello 58'

State Hockey Centre
Umpires:
Stephen Rogers
Adam Barry

10 October 2014
17:30

Tassie Tigers (Tasmania)	1–5	(Western Australia) WA Thundersticks
Arthur 12'	Report	Zalewski 20'; Bausor 45', 57'; Mitton 46', 59'

State Hockey Centre
Umpires:
Stephen Rogers
Stephen Versteegh

10 October 2014
19:30

QLD Blades (Queensland)	3–3	(Victoria (state)) VIC Vikings
Douglas 1'; Reardon 27'; Gohdes 50'	Report	Pollard 22'; Webster 37'; Ciriello 44'

State Hockey Centre
Umpires:
Murray Grime
Levi Stephen

==== Pool D (Classification Round) ====
Pos	Team	Pld	W	D	L	GF	GA	GD	Pts
1	(New South Wales) NSW Waratahs	3	3	0	0	13	5	+8	9
2	(Northern Territory) NT Stingers	3	1	1	1	8	8	0	4
3	(Australian Capital Territory) Canberra Lakers	3	1	1	1	8	8	0	4
4	(South Australia) SA Hotshots	3	0	0	3	8	16	−8	0

Source: Hockey Australia

8 October 2014
13:30

SA Hotshots (South Australia)	4–5	(Northern Territory) NT Stingers
Claxton 14'; White 50'; Child 58'; Oliver 59'	Report	J. Hayward 6', 34'; Pearce 8'; A. Lockley 18'; Dede 57'

State Hockey Centre
Umpires:
Glen Munday
Zeke Newman

8 October 2014
13:30

Canberra Lakers (Australian Capital Territory)	2–4	(New South Wales) NSW Waratahs
M. Hotchkis 25'; Turner 35'	Report	Govers 17', 60'; Miller 34'; Walters 52'

State Hockey Centre
Umpires:
Michael McLean
Levi Stephen

10 October 2014
13:30

SA Hotshots (South Australia)	2–7	(New South Wales) NSW Waratahs
Wickham 7'; Claxton 40'	Report	Dawson 6'; Hill 18'; Govers 24', 32', 40'; H. Ogilvie 42'; Craig 54'

State Hockey Centre
Umpires:
Jeremy Coleman
Glen Munday

10 October 2014
15:30

Canberra Lakers (Australian Capital Territory)	2–2	(Northern Territory) NT Stingers
Turner 52'; Baxter 52'	Report	Pearce 22'; A. Lockley 23'

State Hockey Centre
Umpires:
Scott Embry
Michael McLean

=== Classification matches ===
==== Seventh and eighth place ====
11 October 2014
12:30

Canberra Lakers (Australian Capital Territory)	8–0	(South Australia) SA Hotshots
Turner 7', 31'; Kershaw 14', 33'; Davidson 39', 41'; Shepherd 52'; M. Hotchkis 59'	Report

State Hockey Centre
Umpires:
Jeremy Coleman
Adam Barry

==== Fifth and sixth place ====
11 October 2014
14:30

NSW Waratahs (New South Wales)	3–2	(Northern Territory) NT Stingers
Miller 30', 47'; Govers 57'	Report	J. Hayward 25', 50'

State Hockey Centre
Umpires:
Glen Munday
Scott Embry

==== Third and fourth place ====
11 October 2014
16:30

VIC Vikings (Victoria (state))	4–4	(Queensland) QLD Blades
Zull 6'; Arunasalam 7', 54'; Sherren 44'	Report	Douglas 10'; Rintala 38'; Reardon 43'; Whetton 50'
Penalties
Webster (penalty shoot-out scored); Pollard (penalty shoot-out missed); Simpson (penalty shoot-out scored); Ford (penalty shoot-out scored); Ciriello (penalty shoot-out scored)	4–2	(penalty shoot-out scored) Beale; (penalty shoot-out scored) Wotherspoon; (penalty shoot-out missed) Gohdes; (penalty shoot-out missed) Douglas

State Hockey Centre
Umpires:
Murray Grime
Levi Stephen

==== Final ====
11 October 2014
18:30

WA Thundersticks (Western Australia)	2–2	(Tasmania) Tassie Tigers
Bausor 2'; Mitton 6'	Report	McCambridge 46'; Ockenden 48'
Penalties
Brown (penalty shoot-out missed); Kavanagh (penalty shoot-out missed); Zalewski (penalty shoot-out missed); McGuire (penalty shoot-out scored); Bausor (penalty shoot-out scored) —— McGuire (penalty shoot-out missed)	2–3	(penalty shoot-out missed) Mackey; (penalty shoot-out missed) Deavin; (penalty shoot-out scored) Edwards; (penalty shoot-out missed) Shaw; (penalty shoot-out scored) Ockenden —— (penalty shoot-out scored) Ockenden

State Hockey Centre
Umpires:
Stephen Rogers
Tim Pullman

== Awards ==
Player of the Tournament	Topscorer	Goalkeeper of the Tournament	Play the Whistle
(Tasmania) Eddie Ockenden	(New South Wales) Blake Govers	(Northern Territory) Leon Hayward	(Tasmania) Tassie Tigers

== Statistics ==
=== Final standings ===
Pos	Team	Pld	W	D	L	GF	GA	GD	Pts	Final Result
1st place, gold medalist(s)	(Tasmania) Tassie Tigers	6	3	2	1	15	14	+1	11	Gold Medal
2nd place, silver medalist(s)	(Western Australia) WA Thundersticks	6	4	1	1	16	8	+8	13	Silver Medal
3rd place, bronze medalist(s)	(Victoria (state)) VIC Vikings	6	3	2	1	21	16	+5	11	Bronze Medal
4	(Queensland) QLD Blades	6	1	3	2	15	17	−2	6	
5	(New South Wales) NSW Waratahs	6	4	0	2	20	16	+4	12	
6	(Northern Territory) NT Stingers	6	1	1	4	13	18	−5	4	
7	(Australian Capital Territory) Canberra Lakers	6	2	1	3	20	15	+5	7	
8	(South Australia) SA Hotshots	6	0	2	4	14	30	−16	2	

Source: Hockey Australia

=== Goalscorers ===
There were 134 goals scored in 24 matches, for an average of 5.58 goals per match.

9 goals

- (New South Wales) Blake Govers

6 goals

- (Northern Territory) Jeremy Hayward
- (Victoria (state)) Chris Ciriello
- (Western Australia) Chris Bausor

5 goals

- (Australian Capital Territory) Glenn Turner
- (Western Australia) Trent Mitton

4 goals

- (Australian Capital Territory) Aaron Kershaw
- (Australian Capital Territory) Matthew Hotchkis
- (Queensland) Jacob Whetton
- (South Australia) Alistair Oliver
- (Tasmania) Sam McCambridge

3 goals

- (New South Wales) Joshua Miller
- (Northern Territory) Adrian Lockley
- (Queensland) Justin Douglas
- (Queensland) Joe Reardon
- (Queensland) Dylan Wotherspoon
- (South Australia) Matthew Claxton
- (Tasmania) Paul Ancher
- (Tasmania) Kieron Arthur
- (Victoria (state)) Joshua Pollard

2 goals

- (Australian Capital Territory) Adam Baxter
- (Australian Capital Territory) Iain Davidson
- (Australian Capital Territory) Daniel Hotchkis
- (New South Wales) Matthew Dawson
- (New South Wales) Joshua Walters
- (Northern Territory) Duncan Pearce
- (South Australia) Fraser Bowden
- (South Australia) Marcus Child
- (Tasmania) Eddie Ockenden
- (Victoria (state)) Kiran Arunasalam
- (Victoria (state)) James Webster
- (Victoria (state)) Gordon Zull
- (Western Australia) Craig Boyne
- (Western Australia) Aran Zalewski

1 goal

- (Australian Capital Territory) Stuart Shepherd
- (New South Wales) Tom Craig
- (New South Wales) Jack Hayes
- (New South Wales) Nick Hill
- (New South Wales) Heath Ogilvie
- (Northern Territory) Belema Dede
- (Northern Territory) Tarrant Haami-Jones
- (Queensland) Matthew Gohdes
- (Queensland) Aidan Rintala
- (South Australia) Glyn Tamlin
- (South Australia) Cameron White
- (South Australia) Tom Wickham
- (Tasmania) Geoff Cock
- (Tasmania) Jeremy Edwards
- (Tasmania) Dougal Middleton
- (Victoria (state)) Tim Cross
- (Victoria (state)) Russell Ford
- (Victoria (state)) Alistair McLennan
- (Victoria (state)) Daniel Mirecki
- (Victoria (state)) Adam Seccull
- (Victoria (state)) Jake Sherren
- (Western Australia) Ben Ashford

Source: Hockey Australia
