= Blake Wotherspoon =

Australian field hockey player

Personal information
- Born: 20 February 1997 (age 29) Murwillumbah, New South Wales

Sport
- Sport: Field hockey
- Position: Defender
- Club: Bulimba
Senior career
Years	Team	Caps	Goals
2015	Easts (Brisbane)	-	-
2016	Valleys	-	-
2017-2019	Labrador	-	-
2019-2020	HC Klein Zwitserland	13	6
2019	→ Brisbane Blaze (loan)	5	1
2020-2021	Labrador	-	-
2022	Norths (Brisbane)	-	-
2023-	Bulimba	-	-
2025	Brisbane Blaze	-	-
National team
Years	Team	Caps	Goals
2017-2018	Australia U21	12	(2)

Blake Wotherspoon (born 20 February 1997) is an Australian field hockey player for the Brisbane Blaze. He was a former member of the Australia men's national under-21 field hockey team.

He is the younger brother of Australian International Dylan Wotherspoon.
