= 2005 Men's Oceania Cup =

Field hockey tournament

Tournament details
- Host country: Fiji
- City: Suva
- Dates: 15–19 November
- Teams: 3 (from 1 confederation)
- Venue: National Hockey Stadium

Final positions
- Champions: Australia (4th title)
- Runner-up: New Zealand
- Third place: Fiji

Tournament statistics
- Matches played: 4
- Goals scored: 54 (13.5 per match)
- Top scorer: (New Zealand) Phil Burrows (7 goals)

The 2005 Men's Oceania Cup was the fourth edition of the men's field hockey tournament. It was held from 15–19 November in Suva, Fiji.

The tournament served as a qualifier for the 2006 FIH World Cup.

Australia won the tournament for the fourth time, defeating New Zealand 5–1 in the final.

== Results ==
All times are local (UTC+12:00).

=== Pool ===
Pos	Team	Pld	W	D	L	GF	GA	GD	Pts	Qualification
1	Australia	2	2	0	0	30	2	+28	6	Final
2	New Zealand	2	1	0	1	18	4	+14	3	Final
3	Fiji (H)	2	0	0	2	0	42	−42	0	

Source: Hockey Australia
(H) Hosts

==== Matches ====
15 November 2005
16:00

New Zealand	2–4	Australia
Burrows 5'; Archibald 22'	Report	De Young 11'; Brooks 54'; Eglington 57'; McCann 70'

Umpires:
Kim Hong-Lae (KOR)
Satinder Kumar (IND)

16 November 2005
16:00

Fiji	0–16	New Zealand
	Report	Collins 4'; Shaw 9', 46', 53'; Brooks 23', 34'; Burrows 25', 28', 30', 35+', 48', 69'; Kosoof 39', 41', 58'; Barnett 62'

Umpires:
Satinder Kumar (IND)
Jonathan Wright (RSA)

17 November 2005
16:00

Australia	26–0	Fiji
Smith 7', 11', 25'; Schubert 8', 13', 15', 37'; Knowles 10'; Naylor 14', 17', 24', 46'; Eglington 22', 54', 57'; De Young 27'; Doerner 33', 59'; Dwyer 34', 48', 62', 63', 66', 69'; Wells 40'; Brooks 52'	Report

Umpires:
Jonathan Wright (RSA)
Kim Hong-Lae (KOR)

=== Final ===
19 November 2005
15:00

Australia	5–1	New Zealand
Schubert 14', 27'; Smith 24'; Wells 51'; De Young 52'	Report	Hari 15'

Umpires:
Satinder Kumar (IND)
Kim Hong-Lae (KOR)

== Statistics ==
=== Final standings ===
Pos	Team	Qualification
1	Australia	2006 World Cup
2	New Zealand	
3	Fiji (H)	

Source: Todor66
(H) Host

=== Goalscorers ===
There were 54 goals scored in 4 matches, for an average of 13.5 goals per match.

7 goals

- (New Zealand) Phil Burrows

6 goals

- (Australia) Jamie Dwyer
- (Australia) Grant Schubert

4 goals

- (Australia) Nathan Eglington
- (Australia) Matthew Naylor
- (Australia) Andrew Smith

3 goals

- (Australia) Liam de Young
- (New Zealand) David Kosoof
- (New Zealand) Hayden Shaw

2 goals

- (Australia) Travis Brooks
- (Australia) Luke Doerner
- (Australia) Matthew Wells
- (New Zealand) Gareth Brooks

1 goal

- (Australia) Mark Knowles
- (Australia) Michael McCann
- (New Zealand) Ryan Archibald
- (New Zealand) Shaun Barnett
- (New Zealand) Bryce Collins
- (New Zealand) Bevan Hari

== See also ==
- 2005 Women's Oceania Cup
