= 2015 Sultan Azlan Shah Cup =

Field hockey tournament

- Official logo

Tournament details
- Host country: Malaysia
- City: Ipoh, Perak
- Teams: 6
- Venue: Azlan Shah Stadium

Final positions
- Champions: New Zealand (2nd title)
- Runner-up: Australia
- Third place: India

Tournament statistics
- Matches played: 18
- Goals scored: 96 (5.33 per match)
- Top scorer: (Australia) Jamie Dwyer (8 goals)
- Best player: (Australia) Mark Knowles

The 2015 Sultan Azlan Shah Cup was the 24th edition of the Sultan Azlan Shah Cup. It was held from 5 April to 12 April 2015 in Ipoh, Perak, Malaysia.

New Zealand won the tournament for the second time after defeating Australia 1–3 on penalties, after the match ended in a draw at 2–2, in the final.

== Participating nations ==
Six countries participated in this year's tournament:

- Australia
- India
- South Korea
- Malaysia
- New Zealand
- Canada

== Results ==
All times are Malaysia Standard Time (UTC+08:00)

=== Pool ===
| Pos | Team | Pld | W | D | L | GF | GA | GD | Pts | Qualification |
|---|---|---|---|---|---|---|---|---|---|---|
| 1 | Australia | 5 | 4 | 0 | 1 | 20 | 9 | +11 | 12 | Final |
| 2 | New Zealand | 5 | 3 | 1 | 1 | 15 | 9 | +6 | 10 | Final |
| 3 | South Korea | 5 | 2 | 2 | 1 | 13 | 13 | 0 | 8 | Third Place Match |
| 4 | India | 5 | 2 | 1 | 2 | 14 | 12 | +2 | 7 | Third Place Match |
| 5 | Malaysia (H) | 5 | 2 | 0 | 3 | 13 | 13 | 0 | 6 | Fifth Place Match |
| 6 | Canada | 5 | 0 | 0 | 5 | 5 | 24 | −19 | 0 | Fifth Place Match |

Source: FIH
Rules for classification: 1) points; 2) goal difference; 3) goals scored; 4) head-to-head result.
(H) Hosts

5 April 2015
16:10

| Australia | 7–0 | Canada |
|---|---|---|
| Cross 12'; Wotherspoon 13'; Ockenden 43'; Dwyer 52'; Mitton 53'; Simpson 54'; Whetton 56' | Report |

Umpires:
Satoshi Kondo (JPN)
Ilanggo Kanabathu (MAS)

5 April 2015
18:10

| South Korea | 2–2 | India |
|---|---|---|
| Hyun 25'; Kim S. 53' | Report | Thimmaiah 11'; Raghunath 56' |

Umpires:
Timothy Bond (NZL)
Stephen Rogers (AUS)

5 April 2015
20:10

| Malaysia | 2–4 | New Zealand |
|---|---|---|
| Ramadan 20'; Shahrun 52' | Report | Haig 4'; Child 5'; Hayward 55'; Neal 57' |

Umpires:
Eduardo Lizana (ESP)
Deric Leung (CAN)

6 April 2015
16:10

| Canada | 1–3 | South Korea |
|---|---|---|
| Hildreth 11' | Report | Kim S. 22'; Nam 27'; Jang 54' |

Umpires:
Stephen Rogers (AUS)
Anil Kumar (IND)

6 April 2015
18:10

| New Zealand | 2–1 | India |
|---|---|---|
| Child 38'; Hayward 55' | Report | Akashdeep 43' |

Umpires:
Eduardo Lizana (ESP)
Lim Jung-woo (KOR)

6 April 2015
20:10

| Australia | 3–2 | Malaysia |
|---|---|---|
| Dwyer 43', 53'; Wotherspoon 59' | Report | Firhan 57'; Ahmad 59' |

Umpires:
Satoshi Kondo (JPN)
Deric Leung (CAN)

8 April 2015
16:10

| New Zealand | 5–0 | Canada |
|---|---|---|
| Hilton 26'; Inglis 41', 45'; Child 44'; Neal 59' | Report |

Umpires:
Satoshi Kondo (JPN)
Anil Kumar (IND)

8 April 2015
18:10

| South Korea | 2–5 | Australia |
|---|---|---|
| Kim S. 17'; Jang 54' | Report | Dwyer 18', 45', 48'; Knowles 22'; Ockenden 23' |

Umpires:
Timothy Bond (NZL)
Ilanggo Kanabathu (MAS)

8 April 2015
20:10

| India | 2–3 | Malaysia |
|---|---|---|
| Sardar 20', 51' | Report | Faizal 17'; Samsul 35'; Shahrun 58' |

Umpires:
Lim Jung-woo (KOR)
Stephen Rogers (AUS)

9 April 2015
16:10

| Canada | 3–5 | India |
|---|---|---|
| Scholfield 43'; Gill 49'; Jameson 52' | Report | Rupinder Pal 13'; Raghunath 32'; Ramandeep 46', 47'; Satbir 49' |

Umpires:
Lim Jung-woo (KOR)
Ilanggo Kanabathu (MAS)

9 April 2015
18:10

| Australia | 3–1 | New Zealand |
|---|---|---|
| Wotherspoon 17'; Dwyer 24'; Hayward 28' | Report | Hayward 32' |

Umpires:
Eduardo Lizana (ESP)
Deric Leung (CAN)

9 April 2015
20:10

| Malaysia | 2–3 | South Korea |
|---|---|---|
| Faizal 32'; Razie 34' | Report | Lee J. 3'; Lee N. 29'; Kim Y. 35' |

Umpires:
Anil Kumar (IND)
Timothy Bond (NZL)

11 April 2015
16:10

| India | 4–2 | Australia |
|---|---|---|
| Raghunath 1'; Thimmaiah 23', 32', 60' | Report | Beale 14'; Gohdes 53' |

Umpires:
Deric Leung (CAN)
Ilanggo Kanabathu (MAS)

11 April 2015
18:10

| New Zealand | 3–3 | South Korea |
|---|---|---|
| Archibald 4'; Haig 41'; Child 45' | Report | Nam 11', 31'; Lee N. 45' |

Umpires:
Eduardo Lizana (ESP)
Stephen Rogers (AUS)

11 April 2015
20:10

| Malaysia | 4–1 | Canada |
|---|---|---|
| Haziq 5', 43'; Nabil 6'; Tengku 38' | Report | Sarmento 40' |

Umpires:
Satoshi Kondo (JPN)
Anil Kumar (IND)

=== Classification ===
==== Fifth and sixth ====
11 April 2015
15:40

| Malaysia | 4–4 | Canada |
|---|---|---|
| Razie 2'; Faizal 19', 37'; Firhan 23' | Report | Ho-Garcia 16', 26', 33'; Sarmento 49' |
Penalties
| Faizal (penalty shoot-out scored); Nabil (penalty shoot-out missed); Firhan (penalty shoot-out missed); Haziq (penalty shoot-out missed) | 1–3 | (penalty shoot-out missed) Bissett; (penalty shoot-out scored) Panesar; (penalty shoot-out scored) Gill; (penalty shoot-out scored) Teixeira |

Umpires:
Lim Jung-woo (KOR)
Timothy Bond (NZL)

==== Third and fourth place ====
12 April 2015
18:10

| South Korea | 2–2 | India |
|---|---|---|
| You 20'; Nam 29' | Report | Thimmaiah 10'; Satbir 22' |
Penalties
| Jang (penalty shoot-out scored); Kim K. (penalty shoot-out missed); Kim Ju. (penalty shoot-out missed) | 1–4 | (penalty shoot-out scored) Akashdeep; (penalty shoot-out scored) Sardara; (penalty shoot-out scored) Rupinder Pal; (penalty shoot-out scored) Lakra |

Umpires:
Stephen Rogers (AUS)
Ilanggo Kanabathu (MAS)

==== Final ====
12 April 2015
20:45

| Australia | 2–2 | New Zealand |
|---|---|---|
| Dwyer 50'; Knowles 60' | Report | Hayward 5', 58' |
Penalties
| Beale (penalty shoot-out missed); Whetton (penalty shoot-out scored); Ockenden (penalty shoot-out missed); Zalewski (penalty shoot-out missed) | 1–3 | (penalty shoot-out scored) Inglis; (penalty shoot-out scored) Hilton; (penalty shoot-out scored) Archibald; (penalty shoot-out missed) Child |

Umpires:
Eduardo Lizana (ESP)
Satoshi Kondo (JPN)

== Awards ==
| Top Goalscorer | Player of the Tournament | Goalkeeper of the Tournament | Player of the Final | Fairplay Award |
|---|---|---|---|---|
| (Australia) Jamie Dwyer | (Australia) Mark Knowles | (New Zealand) Devon Manchester | (New Zealand) Andrew Hayward | Canada |

== Final standings ==
| Pos | Team | Pld | W | D | L | GF | GA | GD | Pts | Final Result |
|---|---|---|---|---|---|---|---|---|---|---|
| 1st place, gold medalist(s) | New Zealand | 6 | 3 | 2 | 1 | 17 | 11 | +6 | 11 | Gold Medal |
| 2nd place, silver medalist(s) | Australia | 6 | 4 | 1 | 1 | 22 | 11 | +11 | 13 | Silver Medal |
| 3rd place, bronze medalist(s) | India | 6 | 2 | 2 | 2 | 16 | 14 | +2 | 8 | Bronze Medal |
| 4 | South Korea | 6 | 2 | 3 | 1 | 15 | 15 | 0 | 9 | |
| 5 | Canada | 6 | 0 | 1 | 5 | 9 | 28 | −19 | 1 | |
| 6 | Malaysia (H) | 6 | 2 | 1 | 3 | 17 | 17 | 0 | 7 | |

Source: FIH
(H) Hosts

== Goalscorers ==
There were 96 goals scored in 18 matches, for an average of 5.33 goals per match.

8 goals

- (Australia) Jamie Dwyer

5 goals

- (India) Nikkin Thimmaiah
- (New Zealand) Andrew Hayward

4 goals

- (Malaysia) Faizal Saari
- (New Zealand) Simon Child
- (South Korea) Nam Hyun-woo

3 goals

- (Australia) Dylan Wotherspoon
- (Canada) Gabriel Ho-García
- (India) Vokkaliga Raghunath
- (Malaysia) Haziq Samsul
- (South Korea) Kim Seong-kyu

2 goals

- (Australia) Mark Knowles
- (Australia) Edward Ockenden
- (Canada) Matthew Sarmento
- (India) Ramandeep Singh
- (India) Sardar Singh
- (India) Satbir Singh
- (Malaysia) Firhan Ashaari
- (Malaysia) Shahrun Nabil
- (Malaysia) Razie Rahim
- (Malaysia) Tengku Ahmad Tajuddin
- (New Zealand) Nicholas Haig
- (New Zealand) Hugo Inglis
- (New Zealand) Shay Neal
- (South Korea) Jang Jong-hyun
- (South Korea) Lee Nam-yong

1 goal

- (Australia) Daniel Beale
- (Australia) Timothy Cross
- (Australia) Matthew Gohdes
- (Australia) Jeremy Hayward
- (Australia) Trent Mitton
- (Australia) Glenn Simpson
- (Australia) Jacob Whetton
- (Canada) Jagdish Gill
- (Canada) Richard Hildreth
- (Canada) David Jameson
- (Canada) Oliver Scholfield
- (India) Akashdeep Singh
- (India) Rupinder Pal Singh
- (Malaysia) Nabil Noor
- (Malaysia) Ramadan Rosli
- (New Zealand) Ryan Archibald
- (New Zealand) Blair Hilton
- (South Korea) Hyun Hye-sung
- (South Korea) You Hyo-sik
- (South Korea) Lee Jung-jun
- (South Korea) Kim Young-jin

Source: FIH
