= Craig Strachan =

Craig Strachan may refer to:

- Craig Strachan (hockey) (born 1971), Scottish ice hockey and field hockey player
- Craig Strachan (footballer) (born 1982), retired Scottish footballer
