= Malou Pheninckx =

Dutch field hockey player

Personal information
- Born: 24 July 1991 (age 35) Oosterhout, Netherlands

Sport
- Sport: Field hockey
- Position: Midfielder
- Club: HC Kampong
Senior career
Years	Team	Caps	Goals
–	HC Kampong	-	-
National team
Years	Team	Caps	Goals
2013–	Netherlands	101	(1)
Medal record
Women's field hockey
Representing the Netherlands
Olympic Games
Gold medal – first place	2020 Tokyo	Team
World Cup
Gold medal – first place	2018 London
European Championship
Gold medal – first place	2017 Amsterdam
Gold medal – first place	2019 Antwerp
Gold medal – first place	2021 Amstelveen

Malou Pheninckx (born 24 July 1991) is a Dutch women's field hockey player who currently plays as a midfielder for Netherlands women's national field hockey team. She also pursued her higher education at the Erasmus University Rotterdam in the field of medicine.

She was a key member of the Dutch team which became glorious at the 2012–13 Women's FIH Hockey World League, 2016–17 Women's FIH Hockey World League, 2017 International Festival of Hockey and in the 2018 Women's Hockey World Cup.

== Career ==
She received her first call up to the national team in 2012 following the 2012 Summer Olympics. Pheninckx made her international debut on 4 February 2013 against South Africa alongside fellow player Roos Drost. She played the key role during the Dutch side's maiden triumph in the 2012–13 Women's FIH Hockey World League defeating Australia 5–1 in the Women's Hockey World League final. She also scored 2 goals in the whole tournament.

She was axed from the team in 2014 and was overlooked by the team management for the 2014 Women's Hockey World Cup and 2016 Summer Olympics. Following the 2016 Summer Olympics where the Dutch claimed silver medal, the team management intended to groom youngsters into the team and Malou was surprisingly included in the national team in late 2016. She received a phone call from the head coach Alyson Annan in late 2016 while Malou was attending internships to join the hospitals after completing her medicine studies.

She made a comeback return to the national side after a gap of nearly three years in 2017 and was also the member of the Netherlands side which managed to defend the Hockey World League in 2017 after defeating New Zealand 3–0 in the final. Malou Pheninckx played a key role for the Netherlands women's team which claimed victorious over Japan 5–0 in the 2017 International Festival of Hockey tournament, which was their first International Festival of Hockey tournament title victory. She also scored a winning goal in the final against Japan. She too was also the part of the Dutch team which secured its 8th World Cup title after emerging victorious at the 2018 Women's Hockey World Cup beating Ireland to record an emphatic 6–0 victory in the final. She also scored a winning goal in the final.

During the 2021 Women's EuroHockey Nations Championship, she made her 100th international appearance for the Netherlands in the final against Germany where Dutch emerged as champions with 2–0 victory. She was included in the Dutch squad to compete in the women's field hockey tournament at the 2020 Summer Olympics and also marked her debut appearance at the Olympics.
