= University of Queensland Hockey Club =

Australian field hockey club

The University of Queensland Hockey Club (UQHC) is a men's field hockey club competing in the Brisbane Hockey Association. UQHC was established in 1924 and is one of the oldest and strongest clubs within the Brisbane Hockey Association. UQHC has won one A-grade premiership, in 1964, and a host of InterVarsity Hockey competitions.
