= Glenn Simpson =

Glenn Simpson could refer to:

- Glenn R. Simpson, American journalist, political researcher, and founder of Fusion GPS
- Glenn Simpson (field hockey) (born 1987), Australian field hockey player
