= Leon Hayward =

Australian-born New Zealand field hockey player

Personal information
- Born: 23 April 1990 (age 36) Darwin, Northern Territory, Australia
- Height: 1.78 m (5 ft 10 in)

Sport
- Sport: Field hockey
- Position: Goalkeeper
- Club: Auckland
Senior career
| Years | Team | Caps | Goals |
| 2012–2017 | NT Stingers | 102 | 0 |
| 2019– | Auckland | 5 | 0 |
National team
| Years | Team | Caps | Goals |
| 2009 | Australia U–21 | 13 | (0) |
| 2014–2015 | Australia | 13 | (0) |
| 2019– | New Zealand | 49 | (0) |
Medal record
Men's field hockey
Representing Australia
Junior World Cup
| Bronze medal – third place | 2009 Malaysia/Singapore |
Representing New Zealand
Oceania Cup
| Silver medal – second place | 2023 Whangārei |

Leon Hayward (born 23 April 1990) is an Australian-born New Zealand field hockey player, who plays as a goalkeeper.

== Personal life ==
Leon Hayward was born and raised in Darwin, Northern Territory.

He is the older brother of Kookaburras defender, Jeremy Hayward. His mother, Ellie, is of New Zealand descent.

== Career ==
=== Domestic leagues ===
==== Australian Hockey League ====
Leon Hayward made his debut in the Australian Hockey League for the NT Stingers during the 2012 tournament in Canberra. He was named Goalkeeper of the Tournament during 2014 edition in Adelaide.

==== New Zealand National Hockey League ====
In 2019, Hayward represented the Auckland men's team in the New Zealand National Hockey League in Tauranga.

=== National teams ===
==== Australia Under-21 ====
In 2009, Hayward represented the 'Burras' on two occasions; at the Australian Youth Olympic Festival and Junior World Cup, winning gold and bronze medals respectively.

==== Kookaburras ====
Leon Hayward made his debut for the Kookaburras in 2014, during a test series against India in Perth, Australia. His first and only major tournament for Australia was the 2015 Sultan Azlan Shah Cup in Ipoh, Malaysia, where he won a silver medal.

==== Black Sticks ====
Due to his mother's ancestry, Hayward was eligible for selection in the NZL Black Sticks. He made the move to play for New Zealand following a four-year absence from Australian senior selection.

He made his debut for the Black Sticks in 2019, during a test series against Japan in Stratford, New Zealand.

He was part of the New Zealand hockey squad which competed in the men's field hockey tournament during the 2020 Summer Olympics. It also marked his maiden appearance at the Olympics. He was also a member of the New Zealand hockey squad which competed in the men's field hockey tournament during the 2022 Commonwealth Games. It also eventually marked his maiden appearance at the Commonwealth Games.

He was also named in the New Zealand squad for the 2023 Men's FIH Hockey World Cup and it also marked his maiden FIH Hockey World Cup appearance. During the 2023 Hockey World Cup, he played a clinical and important role which helped New Zealand to qualify to the quarter-final of the competition. He did not start in the playing XI in any of the matches at the 2023 FIH Hockey World Cup as he was benched in favour of first-choice goal-keeper Dom Dixon. He played a huge role in New Zealand's stunning victory over hosts India in the crossover match during the 2023 World Cup which ended up in a penalty shootout where he made five saves out of eight penalties which effectively eliminated India out of the tournament. He came off the bench as a replacement to Dixon during the course of the decisive penalty shootout after both teams drew level at 3–3 before the final whistle was blown.

=== Accounting ===
He also holds a job as an accountant at Finnz Chartered Accountants in Waikato, Auckland. Prior to his commitment as an employee at Finnz Chartered Accountants, he plied his trade in plenty of jobs in the field of finance and also had many coaching stints in field hockey. He reportedly admits that being a chartered accountant in day time and playing field hockey for 10 to 15 hours per week is a demanding job.
