= VHC =

VHC may refer to:

- Valley Hockey Club
- Vavuniya Hindu College
- Vida Heydari Contemporary
- Volumetric heat capacity
- Vonnegut Hardware Company
- IATA code for Saurimo Airport
