= 2013 Sultan Azlan Shah Cup =

Field hockey tournament

- Official logo

Tournament details
- Host country: Malaysia
- City: Ipoh, Perak
- Teams: 6
- Venue: Azlan Shah Stadium

Final positions
- Champions: Australia (7th title)
- Runner-up: Malaysia
- Third place: South Korea

Tournament statistics
- Matches played: 18
- Goals scored: 79 (4.39 per match)
- Top scorer(s): (Malaysia) Faizal Saari (India) Rupinder Pal Singh (6 goals)
- Best player: (Malaysia) Razie Rahim

The 2013 Sultan Azlan Shah Cup was the 22nd edition of the Sultan Azlan Shah Cup. It was held from 9–17 March 2013 in Ipoh, Perak, Malaysia. Australia was the winner after defeating Malaysia in the final.

== Participating nations ==
Six countries participated in this year's tournament:

- Australia
- India
- South Korea
- Malaysia
- New Zealand
- Pakistan

== Results ==
All times are Malaysia Standard Time (UTC+08:00)

=== Pool ===
Pos	Team	Pld	W	D	L	GF	GA	GD	Pts	Qualification
1	Australia	5	3	2	0	17	9	+8	11	Final
2	Malaysia (H)	5	2	3	0	10	8	+2	9	Final
3	New Zealand	5	2	0	3	11	9	+2	6	Third Place Match
4	South Korea	5	1	2	2	9	12	−3	5	Third Place Match
5	Pakistan	5	1	2	2	9	16	−7	5	Fifth Place Match
6	India	5	1	1	3	9	11	−2	4	Fifth Place Match

Source: FIH
Rules for classification: 1) points; 2) goal difference; 3) goals scored; 4) head-to-head result.
(H) Hosts

9 March 2013
16:05

New Zealand	3–4	Pakistan
Russell 30'; Tarrant 52'; Hayward 56'	Report	Imran 19', 28', 58'; Haseem Khan 21'

Umpires:
Jonathan Wright (RSA)
Benjamin de Young (AUS)

9 March 2013
18:05

Australia	4–3	India
Gohdes 24', 39'; Simpson 38'; Mitton 53'	Report	Rupinder Pal 40', 68'; Malak 51'

Umpires:
Ilanggo Kanabathu (MAS)
Timothy Bond (NZL)

9 March 2013
20:05

Malaysia	3–2	South Korea
Faizal 21'; Chua 68', 69'	Report	Nam 57'; Yoon 68'

Umpires:
Marcin Grochal (POL)
Kamran Sharif (PAK)

10 March 2013
16:05

Australia	6–0	Pakistan
Mirecki 8'; Gohdes 9'; Whetton 17', 34'; Beale 45'; Budgeon 61'	Report

Umpires:
Marcin Grochal (POL)
Lim Jung-Woo (KOR)

10 March 2013
18:05

South Korea	2–1	India
Kang 29', 60'	Report	Malak 39'

Umpires:
Benjamin de Young (AUS)
Ilanggo Kanabathu (MAS)

10 March 2013
20:05

Malaysia	2–1	New Zealand
Chua 40'; Tengku 44'	Report	Neal 65'

Umpires:
Jonathan Wright (RSA)
Harsha Vardhan Gandham (IND)

12 March 2013
16:05

South Korea	0–3	New Zealand
	Report	Inglis 4'; Bennett 12'; Hayward 42'

Umpires:
Kamran Sharif (PAK)
Harsha Vardhan Gandham (IND)

12 March 2013
18:05

India	3–1	Pakistan
Rupinder Pal 5'; Akashdeep 9'; Mandeep 56'	Report	Waqas 4'

Umpires:
Timothy Bond (NZL)
Marcin Grochal (POL)

12 March 2013
20:05

Malaysia	1–1	Australia
Faizal 70'	Report	Mitton 34'

Umpires:
Lim Jung-Woo (KOR)
Jonathan Wright (RSA)

14 March 2013
16:05

Australia	3–3	South Korea
Miller 41', 58'; Deavin 70'	Report	Nam 35+'; 43'; Lee S. 55'

Umpires:
Ilanggo Kanabathu (MAS)
Harsha Vardhan Gandham (IND)

14 March 2013
18:05

New Zealand	2–0	India
Hayward 40'; Bennett 57'	Report

Umpires:
Lim Jung-Woo (KOR)
Kamran Sharif (PAK)

14 March 2013
20:05

Pakistan	2–2	Malaysia
Imran 15'; Shan 62'	Report	Saari 6'; Razie 53'

Umpires:
Marcin Grochal (POL)
Benjamin de Young (AUS)

16 March 2013
16:05

Pakistan	2–2	South Korea
Hussain 17'; Khan 47'	Report	Hyun 39'; 53'

Umpires:
Timothy Bond (NZL)
Harsha Vardhan Gandham (IND)

16 March 2013
18:05

New Zealand	2–3	Australia
Smith 27'; Bennett 56'	Report	Whetton 38', 39'; Gohdes 42'

Umpires:
Marcin Grochal (POL)
Ilanggo Kanabathu (MAS)

16 March 2013
20:05

India	2–2	Malaysia
Mandeep 20'; Rupinder Pal 48'	Report	Faizal 6', 70'

Umpires:
Benjamin de Young (AUS)
Lim Jung-Woo (KOR)

=== Classification round ===
==== Fifth and sixth place ====
17 March 2013
15:35

Pakistan	2–4	India
Imran 8'; Shah 46'	Report	Rupinder Pal 10', 62'; Akashdeep 35'; Malak 43'

Umpires:
Timothy Bond (NZL)
Ilanggo Kanabathu (MAS)

==== Third and fourth place ====
17 March 2013
18:05

New Zealand	1–2	South Korea
Jenness 41'	Report	Hyun 33'; Nam 58'

Umpires:
Kamran Sharif (PAK)
Benjamin de Young (AUS)

==== Final ====
17 March 2013
20:35

Australia	3–2	Malaysia
Budgeon 29'; Boyne 30'; Mitton 70'	Report	Faizal 4'; Tengku 48'

Umpires:
Jonathan Wright (RSA)
Marcin Grochal (POL)

== Awards ==
The following five awards were presented at the conclusion of the tournament:

Top Goalscorer	Player of the Tournament	Goalkeeper of the Tournament	Player of the Final	Fairplay Award
(India) Rupinder Pal Singh (Malaysia) Faizal Saari	(Malaysia) Razie Rahim	(Malaysia) Kumar Subramaniam	(Australia) Trent Mitton	South Korea

== Final standings ==
Pos	Team	Pld	W	D	L	GF	GA	GD	Pts	Final Result
1st place, gold medalist(s)	Australia	6	4	2	0	20	11	+9	14	Gold Medal
2nd place, silver medalist(s)	Malaysia (H)	6	2	3	1	12	11	+1	9	Silver Medal
3rd place, bronze medalist(s)	South Korea	6	2	2	2	11	13	−2	8	Bronze Medal
4	New Zealand	6	2	0	4	12	11	+1	6	
5	India	6	2	1	3	13	13	0	7	
6	Pakistan	6	1	2	3	11	20	−9	5	

Source: FIH
(H) Hosts

== Goalscorers ==
There were 79 goals scored in 18 matches, for an average of 4.39 goals per match.

6 goals

- (India) Rupinder Pal Singh
- (Malaysia) Faizal Saari

5 goals

- (Pakistan) Muhammad Imran

4 goals

- (Australia) Matthew Gohdes
- (Australia) Jacob Whetton

3 goals

- (Australia) Trent Mitton
- (India) Malak Singh
- (Malaysia) Chua Boon Huat
- (New Zealand) Cory Bennett
- (New Zealand) Andrew Hayward
- (South Korea) Nam Hyun-woo

2 goals

- (Australia) Nicholas Budgeon
- (Australia) Joshua Miller
- (India) Akashdeep Singh
- (India) Mandeep Singh
- (Malaysia) Tengku Ahmad Tajuddin
- (Pakistan) Abdul Haseem Khan
- (South Korea) Hyun Hye-sung
- (South Korea) Kang Moon-kweon

1 goal

- (Australia) Daniel Beale
- (Australia) Craig Boyne
- (Australia) Timothy Deavin
- (Australia) Daniel Mirecki
- (Australia) Glenn Simpson
- (Malaysia) Razie Rahim
- (New Zealand) Hugo Inglis
- (New Zealand) Stephen Jenness
- (New Zealand) Shay Neal
- (New Zealand) Kane Russell
- (New Zealand) Jacob Smith
- (New Zealand) Blair Tarrant
- (Pakistan) Salman Hussain
- (Pakistan) Kashif Shah
- (Pakistan) Ali Shan
- (Pakistan) Muhammad Waqas
- (South Korea) Lee Seung-il
- (South Korea) Yoon Sung-hoon

1 own goal

- Australia (against South Korea)
- Pakistan (against South Korea)

Source: FIH
