= 2024 Men's International Festival of Hockey =

International field hockey tournament

Tournament details
- Host country: Australia
- City: Perth
- Dates: 6–13 April
- Teams: 2 (from 2 confederations)
- Venue: Perth Hockey Stadium

Final positions
- Champions: Australia (3rd title)
- Runner-up: India

Tournament statistics
- Matches played: 5
- Goals scored: 24 (4.8 per match)
- Top scorer: (Australia) Jeremy Hayward (7 goals)

The 2024 Men's International Festival of Hockey was the third edition of the International Festival of Hockey, a field hockey tournament held in Australia. The tournament took place in Perth from 6–13 April 2024.

The national teams of Australia and India will compete in a five-match test series.

Australia won the tournament, defeating India in all five matches for a 5–0 sweep of the series.

== Background ==
This was the fifth test series between Australia and India in 27 years. The last series was held in Adelaide, Australia in 2022, which ended in their 4–1 victory to Australia. India's last series win against Australia came in 2014, also in Perth. As per an initial memorandum of understanding between the two nations, the series was scheduled to be held in India, but was shifted to Australia, considering most FIH tournaments, including the following Hockey World Cup and the Olympic Games were to be held outside India.

The series was seen as preparation to India and Australia's Olympic Games campaign to be held later that year, where the two teams were drawn in the same group. India went to Australia on the back of five wins in a total of eight games earlier that year. The two teams faced off twice, both in the FIH Pro League, with Australia winning both matches; the first by a 6–4 margin, and the second by 3–0 on penalties after a 2–2 draw in regulation time. Australia entered the series in good form, winning seven out of their eight matches in 2024. The FIH Pro League was the last international tournament that the two teams featured in; the India-leg concluded in February that year. Australia also had a superior head-to-head record over India in the decade prior to the series. Since 2013, they had won 28 times, lost 8 and drawn 7 in the 43 games played against India. However, in the FIH World Ranking, they were ranked fifth, one below India.

Before flying to Australia, India's squad held a three-week preparatory camp in Bhubaneswar. India's head coach Craig Fulton stated that the tour was "crucial" in the team's preparation for the Olympics and added that "Australia is the form team at the moment so it's always nice to test yourself against them."

== Squads ==
The national squads were announced prior to the tournament:

Australia

Head Coach: (Australia) Colin Batch

1. Lachlan Sharp
3. Corey Weyer
4. Jake Harvie
5. Thomas Wickham
6. Matthew Dawson
7. Nathan Ephraums
8. Johan Durst (GK)
9. Jacob Anderson
10. Joshua Beltz
11. Edward Ockenden (C)
12. Jacob Whetton
13. Blake Govers
15. Jayden Atkinson
17. Aran Zalewski (C)
19. Craig Marais
20. Ky Willott
21. Jack Welch
22. Flynn Ogilvie
23. Daniel Beale (C)
26. James Collins
27. Joel Rintala
28. Ashleigh Thomas (GK)
29. Timothy Brand
30. Andrew Charter (GK)
32. Jeremy Hayward (C)
India

Head Coach: (South Africa) Craig Fulton

2. Dilpreet Singh
4. Jarmanpreet Singh
5. Abhishek
7. Manpreet Singh
8. Hardik Singh
9. Gurjant Singh
11. Mandeep Singh
12. Krishan Pathak (GK)
13. Harmanpreet Singh (C)
14. Lalit Upadhyay
16. P. R. Sreejesh (GK)
17. Sumit Walmiki
18. Nilakanta Sharma
21. Shamsher Singh
22. Boby Singh Dhami
23. Amir Ali
25. Raj Kumar Pal
27. Akashdeep Singh
30. Amit Rohidas
31. Jugraj Singh
32. Vivek Sagar Prasad
34. Sukhjeet Singh
35. Mohammed Raheel
40. Vishnukant Singh
70. Sanjay
77. Suraj Karkera (GK)
90. Araijeet Singh Hundal

== Officials ==
The following umpires were appointed by Hockey Australia and the FIH to officiate the tournament:

- Benjamin de Young (AUS)
- Daniel Johnston (AUS)
- Jordan Moore (AUS)
- Raghu Prasad (IND)
- Timothy Sheahan (AUS)

== Results ==
All times are local (AWST).

=== Standings ===
| Pos | Team | Pld | W | D | L | GF | GA | GD | Pts | Result |
|---|---|---|---|---|---|---|---|---|---|---|
| 1 | Australia (H) | 5 | 5 | 0 | 0 | 17 | 7 | +10 | 15 | Tournament Champion |
| 2 | India | 5 | 0 | 0 | 5 | 7 | 17 | −10 | 0 | |

Source: FIH
Rules for classification: 1) points; 2) matches won; 3) goal difference; 4) goals for; 5) head-to-head result; 6) field goals scored.
(H) Hosts

=== Fixtures ===
6 April 2024
16:40

| Australia | 5–1 | India |
|---|---|---|
| Brand 3'; Wickham 20', 38'; Rintala 37'; Ogilvie 57' | Report | G. Singh 47' |

Umpires:
Benjamin de Young (AUS)
Timothy Sheahan (AUS)

7 April 2024
16:40

| Australia | 4–2 | India |
|---|---|---|
| Hayward 6', 34'; Anderson 42'; Ephraums 45' | Report | Ju. Singh 9'; Harm. Singh 30' |

Umpires:
Timothy Sheahan (AUS)
Benjamin de Young (AUS)

10 April 2024
17:40

| Australia | 2–1 | India |
|---|---|---|
| Hayward 44', 49' | Report | Ju. Singh 41' |

Umpires:
Benjamin de Young (AUS)
Timothy Sheahan (AUS)

12 April 2024
17:40

| Australia | 3–1 | India |
|---|---|---|
| Hayward 19', 47'; Welch 54' | Report | Harm. Singh 12' |

Umpires:
Daniel Johnston (AUS)
Jordan Moore (AUS)

13 April 2024
16:40

| Australia | 3–2 | India |
|---|---|---|
| Hayward 20'; Willott 38'; Brand 39' | Report | Harm. Singh 4'; Dhami 53' |

Umpires:
Timothy Sheahan (AUS)
Daniel Johnston (AUS)

== Goalscorers ==
There were 24 goals scored in 5 matches, for an average of 4.8 goals per match.

7 goals

- (Australia) Jeremy Hayward

3 goals

- (India) Harmanpreet Singh

2 goals

- (Australia) Timothy Brand
- (Australia) Thomas Wickham
- (India) Jugraj Singh

1 goal

- (Australia) Jacob Anderson
- (Australia) Nathan Ephraums
- (Australia) Flynn Ogilvie
- (Australia) Joel Rintala
- (Australia) Jack Welch
- (Australia) Ky Willott
- (India) Gurjant Singh
- (India) Boby Singh Dhami

Source: FIH
