= Nicholas Budgeon =

Australian field hockey player

Personal information
- Full name: Nicholas James Budgeon
- Born: 28 December 1987 (age 38) Launceston, Tasmania

Sport
- Sport: Field hockey
- Position: Defender
- Club: Antwerp
Senior career
Years	Team	Caps	Goals
2011–2013	Tassie Tigers	26	11
2016	WA Thundersticks	5	2
2016–2017	Den Bosch	-	-
2017–2021	HGC	-	-
2021–present	Antwerp	-	-
National team
Years	Team	Caps	Goals
2013–2015	Australia	48	(12)
Medal record
Men's field hockey
Representing Australia
Champions Trophy
Bronze medal – third place	2014 Bhubaneswar

Nicholas James Budgeon (born 28 December 1987) is a former field hockey player from Australia, who plays as a defender.

== Personal life ==
Nicholas Budgeon was born and raised in Launceston, Tasmania.

He plays as a defender, and also specialises in drag flicking.

== Career ==
=== Australian Hockey League ===
At domestic level, Nicholas Budgeon has represented both his home state Tasmania, and Western Australia in the Australian Hockey League.

From 2011 to 2013, Budgeon was a member of the Tassie Tigers. In 2016, he transitioned to the WA Thundersticks.

=== Kookaburras ===
Nicholas Budgeon made his senior international debut for the Kookaburras in 2013 at the Sultan Azlan Shah Cup.

Following his debut, Budgeon continued to represent Australia until 2015, most notably winning a bronze medal at the 2014 Champions Trophy.
