= 2016 Men's International Festival of Hockey =

Tournament details
- City: Melbourne, Victoria; Bendigo, Victoria
- Teams: 4
- Venue(s): State Netball and Hockey Centre; Bendigo Hockey Complex

Final positions
- Champions: Australia (1st title)
- Runner-up: New Zealand
- Third place: India

Tournament statistics
- Matches played: 8
- Goals scored: 36 (4.5 per match)
- Top scorer: (India) Rupinder Pal Singh (6 goals)
- Best player: (Australia) Dylan Wotherspoon

The 2016 Men's International Festival of Hockey was a field hockey tournament held in Victoria, Australia. The tournament was held between 23 and 30 November in the Victorian cities, Melbourne and Bendigo. A total of four teams competed in the tournament.

Australia won the tournament for the first time by defeating New Zealand 3–1 in the final. India won the bronze medal by defeating Malaysia 4–1 in the third and fourth playoff.

All times are local (UTC+10:00).

== Participating nations ==
- Australia
- India
- Malaysia
- New Zealand

== Results ==
=== Melbourne ===
The first phase of the tournament was a 4 team tournament at the State Netball and Hockey Centre in Melbourne.

==== Pool matches ====
Pos	Team	Pld	W	D	L	GF	GA	GD	Pts	Qualification
1	Australia	3	3	0	0	11	3	+8	9	Final
2	New Zealand	3	1	1	1	5	6	−1	4	Final
3	India	3	1	0	2	8	8	0	3	Third and fourth
4	Malaysia	3	0	1	2	3	10	−7	1	Third and fourth

Source: Hockey Australia
Rules for classification: 1) points; 2) goal difference; 3) goals scored; 4) head-to-head result.

23 November 2016
16:00

Malaysia	1–1	New Zealand
Shahril 32'	Report	Panchia 58'

Umpires:
Murray Grime (AUS)
Haider Rasool (PAK)

23 November 2016
20:00

Australia	3–2	India
Hayward 24', 36'; Mitton 43'	Report	Rupinder Pal 21', 53'

Umpires:
Gareth Greenfield (NZL)
Iskandar Rusli (MAS)

24 November 2016
18:00

India	4–2	Malaysia
Thimmaiah 24', 55'; Rupinder Pal 40'; Akashdeep 55'	Report	Faizal 39'; Shahril 47'

Umpires:
Murray Grime (AUS)
Gareth Greenfield (NZL)

24 November 2016
20:00

Australia	3–1	New Zealand
Govers 8', 9'; Kleinschmidt 15'	Report	Russell 41'

Umpires:
Haider Rasool (PAK)
Deepak Joshi (IND)

26 November 2016
15:00

Australia	5–0	Malaysia
Whetton 9', 43'; Boyde 51'; Kleinschmidt 56'; Zalewski 57'	Report

Umpires:
Gareth Greenfield (NZL)
Deepak Joshi (IND)

26 November 2016
17:00

India	2–3	New Zealand
Rupinder Pal 18', 58'	Report	Ross 47'; Smith 48'; Inglis 57'

Umpires:
Murray Grime (AUS)
Iskander Rusli (MAS)

===== Third and fourth place =====
27 November 2016
16:00

India	4–1	Malaysia
Akashdeep 2'; Raghunath 45'; Talwinder 52'; Rupinder Pal 57'	Report	van Huizen 45'

Umpires:
Gareth Greenfield (NZL)
Murray Grime (AUS)

===== Final =====
27 November 2016
18:00

Australia	3–1	New Zealand
Mitton 24'; Bausor 47'; Hayward 59'	Report	Russell 48'

Umpires:
Haider Rasool (PAK)
Iskander Rusli (MAS)

=== Bendigo ===
The second phase of the tournament was a two match test series held at the Bendigo Hockey Complex.

==== Test Matches ====
29 November 2016
18:30

Australia	2–3	India
Willis 36'; Mitton 43'	Report	Affan 19', 19'; Raghunath 44'

Umpires:
Deepak Joshi (IND)
Zeke Newman (AUS)

30 November 2016
18:30

India	3–4	Australia
Akashdeep 6'; Raghunath 22', 35'	Report	Mitton 13'; Whetton 23'; Hayward 38', 54'

Umpires:
Deepak Joshi (IND)
Zeke Newman (AUS)

== Women's tournament ==
=== Melbourne ===
The women's tournament was a three match test series held at the State Netball and Hockey Centre.

==== Results ====
23 November 2016
18:00

Australia	0–1	India
	Report	Rampal 21'

Umpires:
Rhiannon Murrie (AUS)
Bernadette Pangrazio (AUS)

25 November 2016
19:00

India	1–4	Australia
Rampal 27'	Report	Slattery 8'; Nanscawen 26'; Fey 29'; Bone 51'

Umpires:
Rhiannon Murrie (AUS)
Emily Carroll (AUS)

27 November 2016
14:00

Australia	3–1	India
Peris 39'; Nance 41'; Holzberger 58'	Report	Katariya 17'

Umpires:
Emily Carroll (AUS)
Bernadette Pangrazio (AUS)

== Statistics ==
=== Final standings ===
==== Melbourne ====
1. Australia
2. New Zealand
3. India
4. Malaysia

==== Bendigo ====
The Bendigo series finished as a tie, with both teams winning one match as well as scoring and conceding 6 goals each.

- Australia
- India
