= Julie Kilpatrick =

Scottish field hockey player

Julie Kilpatrick (born 22 August 1983 in Glasgow) is a female field hockey player from Scotland. She plays in midfield and defence, and made her debut for the Women's National Team in 2003. Kilpatrick is engaged to Scottish and GB international hockey player, David Mitchell.
