= 2017 Women's International Festival of Hockey =

Tournament details
- Host country: Australia
- City: Melbourne; Bendigo, Victoria
- Teams: 4
- Venue(s): State Netball and Hockey Centre; Bendigo Hockey Complex

Final positions
- Champions: Netherlands (1st title)
- Runner-up: Japan
- Third place: Australia

Tournament statistics
- Matches played: 9
- Goals scored: 38 (4.22 per match)
- Top scorer: (Netherlands) Kelly Jonker (5 goals)

The 2017 Women's International Festival of Hockey is the second edition of the annual International Festival of Hockey. The tournament will be held in Victoria, Australia. The tournament will take place between 5–12 November in the Victorian cities, Melbourne and Bendigo. Four teams will compete in the tournament, an increase from two at the previous edition.

All times are local (UTC+10:00).

== Participating nations ==
- Australia
- Japan
- Netherlands
- United States

== Results ==
=== Bendigo ===
The first stage of the tournament was a test match in Bendigo at the Bendigo Hockey Complex.

==== Test match ====
6 November 2017
18:00

Australia	2–0	United States
Ratcliffe 14'; Hurtz 49'	Report

Umpires:
Maggie Befort (USA)
Emily Carroll (AUS)

=== Melbourne ===
The second stage of the tournament is a 4 team competition at the State Netball and Hockey Centre in Melbourne.

==== Pool stage ====
Pos	Team	Pld	W	D	L	GF	GA	GD	Pts	Qualification
1	Netherlands	3	3	0	0	14	2	+12	9	Final
2	Japan	3	1	1	1	4	8	−4	4	Final
3	Australia (H)	3	1	0	2	5	7	−2	3	Third and fourth
4	United States	3	0	1	2	3	9	−6	1	Third and fourth

Source: FIH
Rules for classification: 1) points; 2) goal difference; 3) goals scored; 4) head-to-head result.
(H) Hosts

8 November 2017
15:00

United States	0–0	Japan
	Report

Umpires:
Emily Carroll (AUS)
Jo Cumming (NZL)

8 November 2017
19:30

Australia	0–2	Netherlands
	Report	Van Maasakker 8'; Krekelaar 36'

Umpires:
Maggie Befort (USA)
Junko Wagatsuma (JPN)

9 November 2017
16:30

Netherlands	6–1	Japan
Jonker 4', 15'; Welten 6', 24', 26'; Krekelaar 10'	Report	Y. Nagai 37'

Umpires:
Emily Carroll (AUS)
Maggie Befort (USA)

9 November 2017
19:30

Australia	3–2	United States
Claxton 37'; Peris 50'; Hurtz 54'	Report	González 8'; Di Nardo 15'

Umpires:
Katrina Woolf (NZL)
Jo Cumming (NZL)

11 November 2017
14:00

Netherlands	6–1	United States
Leurink 10' van den Assem 19', 41'; Jonker 28'; Dirkse van den Heuvel 40'; Matla 47'	Report	Van Sickle 29'

Umpires:
Junko Wagatsuma (JPN)
Katrina Woolf (NZL)

11 November 2017
17:00

Australia	2–3	Japan
S. Fitzpatrick 4', 54'	Report	Y. Nagai 3'; Nomura 18', 56'

Umpires:
Maggie Befort (USA)
Jo Cumming (NZL)

==== Classification matches ====
===== Third and fourth place =====
12 November 2017
13:15

Australia	5–0	United States
Ratcliffe 29'; Peris 31', 38'; Smith 32'; Kershaw 40'	Report

Umpires:
Junko Wagatsuma (JPN)
Jo Cumming (NZL)

===== Final =====
12 November 2017
16:45

Netherlands	5–0	Japan
Jonker 27', 51'; Welten 37'; Pheninckx 45'; Keetels 48'	Report

Umpires:
Meggie Befort (USA)
Katrina Woolf (NZL)

== Statistics ==
=== Final standings ===
1. Netherlands
2. Japan
3. Australia
4. United States

=== Goalscorers ===
There were 38 goals scored in 9 matches, for an average of 4.22 goals per match.

5 goals

- (Netherlands) Kelly Jonker

4 goals

- (Netherlands) Lidewij Welten

3 goals

- (Australia) Brooke Peris

2 goals

- (Australia) Savannah Fitzpatrick
- (Australia) Emily Hurtz
- (Australia) Madeleine Ratcliffe
- (Japan) Yuri Nagai
- (Japan) Kana Nomura
- (Netherlands) Maartje Krekelaar
- (Netherlands) Ireen van den Assem

1 goal

- (Australia) Jane Claxton
- (Australia) Stephanie Kershaw
- (Australia) Emily Smith
- (Netherlands) Carlien Dirkse van den Heuvel
- (Netherlands) Marloes Keetels
- (Netherlands) Laurien Leurink
- (Netherlands) Frédérique Matla
- (Netherlands) Caia van Maasakker
- (Netherlands) Malou Pheninckx
- (United States) Casey Di Nardo
- (United States) Melissa González
- (United States) Caitlin van Sickle

Source: FIH
