= Dylan Wotherspoon =

Australian field hockey player

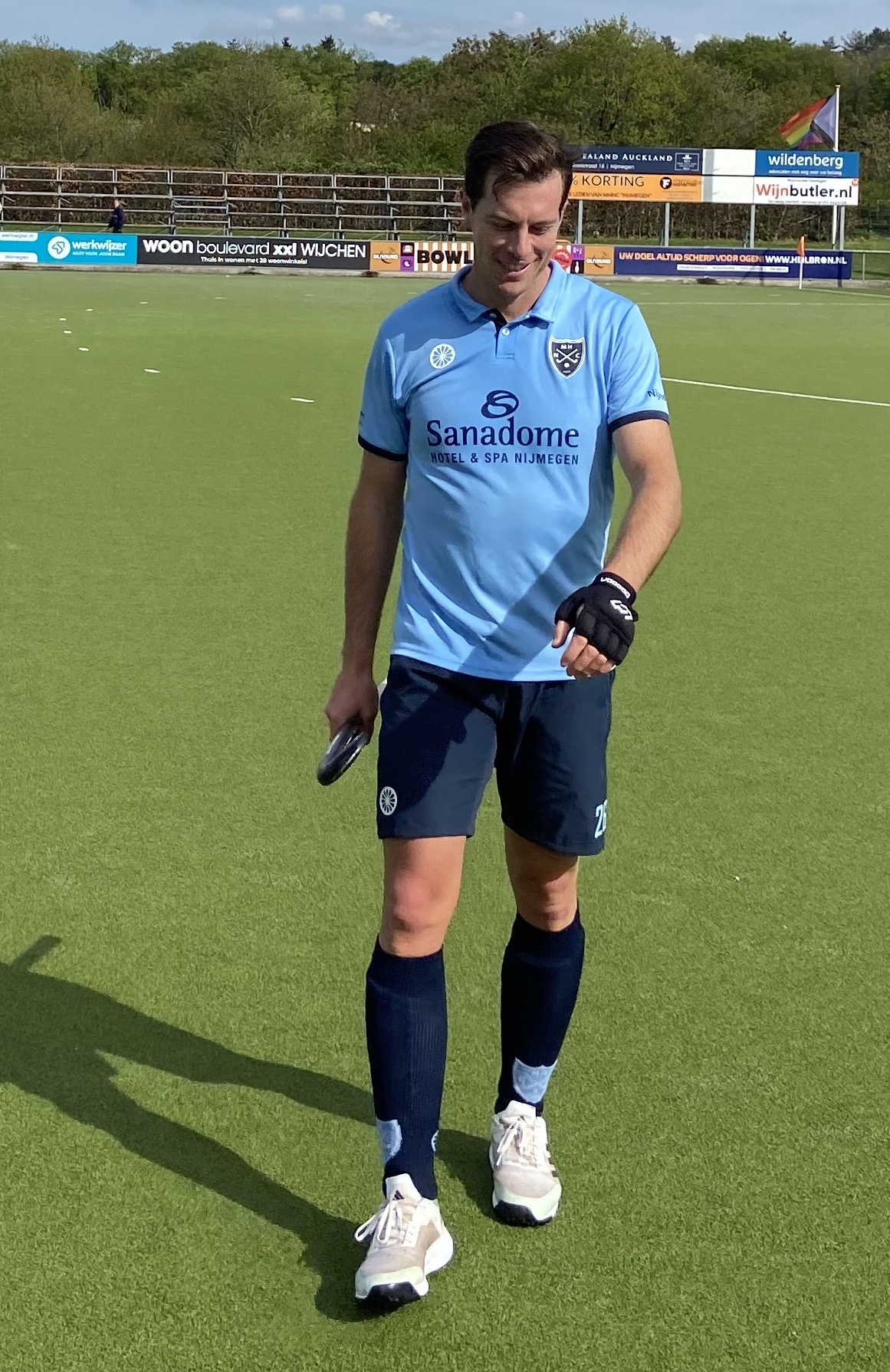
- Wotherspoon playing for NMHC Nijmegen

Personal information
- Born: 9 April 1993 (age 33) Murwillumbah, New South Wales

Sport
- Sport: Field hockey
- Position: Attacker
- Club: THC Hurley
Senior career
Years	Team	Caps	Goals
2010–2016	Eastern Suburbs	-	-
2016	Dabang Mumbai	10	0
2016–2017	HC 's-Hertogenbosch	19	11
2017–2021	Labrador	-	-
2019	→ Brisbane Blaze (loan)	7	8
2021-2023	HC 's-Hertogenbosch	41	14
2023-2026	NMHC Nijmegen	73	13
2026-	THC Hurley	8	6
National team
Years	Team	Caps	Goals
2014–2020	Australia	93	(32)
Medal record
Men's field hockey
Representing Australia
World Cup
Bronze medal – third place	2018 Bhubaneswar	Team
Commonwealth Games
Gold medal – first place	2018 Gold Coast	Team
FIH Pro League
Silver medal – second place	Season Two	Team
FIH World League
Gold medal – first place	2014-15 Raipur	Team
Gold medal – first place	2016-17 Bhubaneswar	Team
Oceania Cup
Gold medal – first place	2017 Sydney	Team
Youth Olympic Games
Gold medal – first place	2010 Singapore	Team

Dylan Wotherspoon (born 9 April 1993) is an Australian International Field Hockey player who plays for THC Hurley. His normal position is forward. He won a gold medal in the 2018 Commonwealth Games.

== Club career ==
Wotherspoon played his junior career for Redbacks Hockey Club in Murwillumbah before relocating to Brisbane in 2010 to play with Eastern Suburbs Hockey Club in the Brisbane Hockey League.

Wotherspoon was signed by Dabang Mumbai for $35,750US for the 2016 Hockey India League.

Later in 2016, Wotherspoon was signed by Hoofdklasse club HC 's-Hertogenbosch for the 2016–17 season. After a successful season in the Netherlands, Wotherspoon returned home in 2017 to play with Labrador HC.

Dylan was also a regular member of the Queensland Blades team in the Australian Hockey League.

In 2019 Dylan was signed by Brisbane Blaze in the inaugural Hockey One season.

In 2021 Dylan re-signed with HC 's-Hertogenbosch. In 2023 he helped the club win the Gold Cup.

In 2023 Dylan signed with NMHC Nijmegen for the 2023-24 season. On 12 May 2024 he helped them seal promotion to the Hoofdklasse for the first time in almost 50 years.

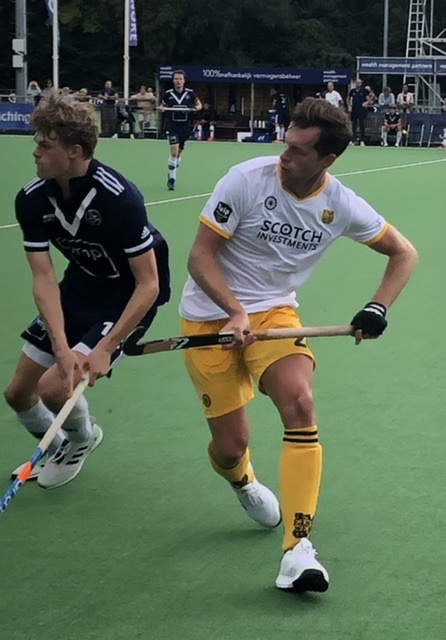
Wotherspoon (right) playing for HC 's-Hertogenbosch

After 3 years with Nijmegen, Dylan signed with THC Hurley in August 2026.

== International career ==
=== 2014 ===
Dylan Wotherspoon made his senior international debut against India in late 2014.

=== 2015 ===
In April 2015 he made his tournament debut in the 2015 Sultan Azlan Shah Cup, scoring 3 goals in the tournament. Wotherspoon scored his first ever international goal in this tournament, scoring in Australia's 7–0 win over Canada. In December 2015 was selected for the 2014-15 Men's FIH Hockey World League Final where he scored 2 goals, including in the semi-final against The Netherlands.

=== 2016 ===
In 2016 he was named in the squad for the 2016 Men's Hockey Champions Trophy in London, but had to withdraw with injury, which also ruled him out of the 2016 Olympic Games. In November 2016 Wotherspoon returned from injury to be named player of the tournament in the 2016 Men's International Festival of Hockey in Melbourne.

=== 2017 ===
In April Wotherspoon was named in the squad for the 2017 Sultan Azlan Shah Cup and scored a goal in the tournament final. In July he was selected for the 2016–17 Men's FIH Hockey World League Semifinals in Johannesburg. In October, Wotherspoon scored 7 goals in Australia's Oceania Cup triumph. In December he was selected for the 2016–17 Men's FIH Hockey World League Final where he was awarded his 50th cap and scored 2 goals, including in the semi-final against Germany.

=== 2018 ===
In February 2018 Wotherspoon played in all four test matches against The Netherlands in Perth. He then played all 6 matches and scored two goals in Australia's successful Sultan Azlan Shah Cup tournament win in March 2018. In April 2018 Dylan won a gold medal as part of Australia's gold medal-winning team in the 2018 Commonwealth Games in Dylan's home city of The Gold Coast. Dylan played all 6 matches, scoring a goal against Scotland and two goals against Canada. In September, Dylan was selected for the 2018 Men's International Hockey Open in Darwin. He scored in the opening match, a 5–2 victory over Malaysia, then netted a hat-trick in the 3–0 win over Japan. Despite losing 2–1 to Argentina in the final, Wotherspoon finished the tournament as the top goal scorer with 4 goals. Dylan was named in the Kookaburra's squad to play in the 2018 World Cup in Bhubaneswar where he played in all six matches and scored a goal against China.

=== 2019 ===
After being rotated from the squad for the opening fixtures of the 2019 Men's FIH Pro League, Wotherspoon scored his 30th international goal in the 4–2 win over Germany in Hobart in February. He then played in the 2–1 win over Spain in Sydney, as well as in the 3–2 win over Argentina and 5–1 win over New Zealand, both in Sydney in March. Unfortunately he injured his hamstring after only 5 minutes during the 3-4 Anzac Day win over New Zealand in Auckland and could not return to the field. Dylan returned from injury to the squad for the European leg of the League in June 2019.

=== 2020 ===
Dylan started the year playing in the 2020 Men's FIH Pro League, scoring his 31st international goal against Great Britain. In February Dylan celebrated his 90th cap by scoring against India in Odisha.

== Personal life ==
Dylan's younger brother Blake is a former Australian under 21 international who played for HC Klein Zwitserland.
