= Aleksander Korcz =

Polish field hockey player (born 1975)

Aleksander Korcz (born 14 May 1975) is a Polish former field hockey player who competed in the 2000 Summer Olympics. He now owns a food catering business in Adelaide, Australia called the Prep House.
