= Tim Cross (field hockey) =

Irish field hockey player (born 1991)

Personal information
- Full name: Timothy Cross
- Born: 26 January 1991 (age 35) Melbourne, Australia

Sport
- Sport: Field hockey
- Position: Defence
Senior career
Years	Team	Caps	Goals
–	Annadale	-	-
National team
Years	Team	Caps	Goals
2015–2016	Australia	8	(1)
2019–	Ireland	46	(3)
Medal record
Men's field hockey
Representing Ireland
EuroHockey Championship II
Bronze medal – third place	2021 Gniezno	Team
Representing Australia
Sultan Azlan Shah Cup
Silver medal – second place	2015 Ipoh	Team

Timothy Cross (born 26 January 1991) is an Australian–Irish field hockey player.

== Life ==
Cross was born in Melbourne, Australia, on 26 January 1991.

== Field hockey ==
=== Domestic league ===
Cross currently competes in the Irish Hockey League, where he represents Annadale.

=== Australia ===
He made his debut for Australia team in 2015 at the Sultan Azlan Shah Cup in Ipoh.

The following year he was named in the Australian development squad, and represented the team at the Trans–Tasman Trophy in Auckland.

=== Ireland ===
Following a three-year hiatus from international hockey, Cross made his international debut for Ireland 2019. He appeared in a test series against Scotland in Glasgow.

Cross has medalled with the national team on one occasion. He took home bronze at the 2021 EuroHockey Championship II in Gniezno.

He competed at the 2024 FIH Olympic Qualifiers in Valencia.
