= Chris Bausor =

Australian field hockey player

Personal information
- Born: 10 November 1989 (age 36) Perth, Western Australia

Sport
- Sport: Field hockey
- Position: Midfielder
National team
Years	Team	Caps	Goals
2009	Australia U–21	9	(1)
2011–2016	Australia	23	(2)
Medal record
Men's field hockey
Representing Australia
Junior World Cup
Bronze medal – third place	2009 Johor Bahru/Singapore	Team

Christopher Bausor (born 10 November 1989) is a field hockey player from Australia, who plays as a midfielder.

== Personal life ==
Chris Bausor was born and raised in Perth, Western Australia.

He studied (but unconfirmed if finished) a degree in mechanical engineering at the University of Western Australia.

== Career ==
=== State level ===
At state representative level, Bausor plays hockey for his home state in the Australian Hockey League, for the WA Thundersticks.

=== National teams ===
==== Under–21 ====
In 2009, Bausor was a member of the 'Burras' team at the Junior World Cup held in Johor Bahru, Malaysia and Singapore. Australia won a bronze medal at the tournament, with Bausor scoring once during the campaign.

==== Kookaburras ====
Bausor made his senior international debut in 2011, during a five-nations tournament in Paris, France.

Since his debut, Bausor has made 23 appearances for the Kookaburras, most recently in 2016 at the International Festival of Hockey in Melbourne, Victoria.

=== International goals ===
Goal	Date	Location	Opponent	Score	Result	Competition	Ref.
1	19 November 2016	Lloyd Elsmore Hockey Stadium, Auckland, New Zealand	New Zealand	2–0	2–1	2016 Trans-Tasman Trophy	
2	27 November 2016	State Netball and Hockey Centre, Melbourne, Australia	New Zealand	2–0	3–1	2016 I.F.O.H.	
