= Craig Strachan (hockey) =

Scottish ice hockey player

Craig Strachan (born 10 February 1971), represented Scotland in both ice hockey and field hockey in the 1980s. At club level, he played for Dundee Rockets and Fife Flyers at ice hockey.

Born in Dundee, Strachan represented Scotland at indoor hockey in both the U-18s, U-21s and senior levels. An article in the Evening Telegraph of 19 December 1989 cites that Strachan netted 10 of the goals scored at the U-21 Midshires Tournament in Birmingham.

Strachan played with Menzieshill, Dundee Wanderers and Plexus Mercian at club level. While playing at NMP Menzieshill, they won the Scottish Indoor Hockey Club Championships at Kelvinhall, Glasgow (18 February 1990) beating Western Indespension 10–5. While playing with Plexus Mercian they won the national league, which earned them a place in the European Cup, in Cologne, Germany. Strachan is currently playing for Falkirk GHG Hockey Club.

His cousins Niall Stott, Ross Stott and Jenny Gerrard have followed in his footsteps, currently representing Scotland in field hockey.
