= Niall Stott =

British field hockey player (born 1981)

Personal information
- Born: 6 February 1981 (age 45) Dundee, Scotland
- Height: 168 cm (5 ft 6 in)
- Weight: 75 kg (165 lb)

Sport
- Sport: Field hockey
- Position: Midfielder/Attacker
Senior career
Years	Team	Caps	Goals
2004	Dundee Wanderers	-	-
2006–2008	Kelburne	-	-
2008–2009	UHC Hamburg	-	-
2009–2016	East Grinstead	-	-
2017–2021	Fareham	-	-
National team
Years	Team	Caps	Goals
2004–2014	GB	92	-
2004–2014	Scotland	159	-
Medal record
Representing Scotland
European Championship II
Bronze medal – third place	2011 Vinnytsia	Team

Niall Craig Stott (born 6 February 1981) is a Scottish former field hockey player who was a member of the Great Britain squad that finished ninth at the 2004 Summer Olympics.

== Biography ==
Stott was born in Dundee and played as a midfield/attacker. He began playing club hockey when he was eleven years old. His brother Ross also played for Scotland, while his cousin, Craig Strachan, was a senior international.

In 2004 as a member of Dundee Wanderers, he represented Great Britain at the Olympic Games in Athens

Stott was part of the Scotland Commonwealth Games team at the 2006 Commonwealth Games in Melbourne and when attached to Kelburne Hockey Club he was selected as a travelling reserve for the 2008 Summer Olympics in Beijing.

In 2009, Stott joined East Grinstead to play in the Men's England Hockey League.

While at East Grinstead, he played for Scotland during the 2010 Commonwealth Games in Delhi, represented Great Britain at the 2011 Men's Hockey Champions Trophy and won a bronze medal with the team at the 2011 Men's EuroHockey Championship II in Vinnytsia, Ukraine.

He represented Scotland in the 2014 Commonwealth Games in Glasgow.

After the Commonwealth Games, Stott announced his international retirement in August 2014.

Stott suffered a double leg break in 2019 while playing for Fareham Hockey Club.
