= David Mitchell (field hockey) =

Scottish field hockey player

Personal information
- Born: 16 September 1981 (age 44) Bellshill, Scotland

Sport
- Sport: Field hockey
- Position: Defender
Senior career
Years	Team	Caps	Goals
–	Motherwell HC	-	-
2007–2009	Western Wildcats	-	-
National team
Years	Team	Caps	Goals
–	Scotland		-
2003–2004	GB	16	-

David Mitchell (born 16 September 1981) is a male former field hockey defender from Scotland.

== Biography ==
Mitchell was educated at Dalziel High School. He played club hockey for Motherwell HC in the Scottish leagues, and made his debut for the Men's National Team in 2001. Mitchell is engaged to Scottish international hockey player Julie Kilpatrick.

He was part of the Scotland Commonwealth Games team at the 2006 Commonwealth Games in Melbourne. He made his Great Britain debut on 1 July 2003 and earned 16 caps.

From 2007 to 2009 Mitchell played for Western Wildcats and was the men's player of the Year in 2008/2009.

In 2025, he took the role of senior audit partner for Deloitte in Glasgow. He had been working for them since 2016.
