= International Festival of Hockey =

- Sport: Field hockey
- Founded: 2016
- No. of teams: 4
- Country: Australia
- Most recent champions: Australia (M, 3rd title); China (W, 1st title)
- Most titles: Australia (M, 3 titles); Australia (W, 1 title); China (W, 1 title); Netherlands (W, 1 title)
- Website: Hockey Australia

The International Festival of Hockey is a men's and women's invitational, international field hockey tournament hosted annually by Hockey Australia.

The tournament was previously held in the Victorian cities of Bendigo and Melbourne, however was moved to Perth, Western Australia, for the 2024 edition.

== Format ==
Founded in 2016, the International Festival of Hockey hosts two stages of competition in both the men's and women's events.

The first stage of the competition comprises a series of test matches in both the men's and women's events. The test matches are held in Bendigo at the Bendigo Hockey Complex.

The second stage of the competition is a men's and women's competitive tournament held at the State Netball and Hockey Centre in the Victorian capital, Melbourne. The women's tournament has been altered to match the men's, as the number of women's teams has increased at the 2017 edition from two teams to four, as well as the inclusion of a competitive tournament, which was absent at the 2016 edition.

In 2024, the tournament was reintroduced. The men's tournament consisted of a series of test matches, while the women's tournament consisted of a round-robin format.

== Results ==
=== Men ===
==== Summaries ====
Year	Hosts	Final			3rd Place Match		
Year	Hosts	Champions	Score	Runners-up	3rd Place	Score	4th Place
2016	Melbourne, VIC	Australia	3–1	New Zealand	India	4–1	Malaysia
2017	Melbourne, VIC	Australia	2–1	New Zealand	Japan	2–1	Pakistan
2024	Perth, WA	Australia	5–0 (matches won)	India	only two teams		

==== Team appearances ====
Team	2016	2017	2024	Total
Australia	1st	1st	1st	3
India	3rd	–	2nd	2
Japan	–	3rd	–	1
Malaysia	4th	–	–	1
New Zealand	2nd	2nd	–	2
Pakistan	–	4th	–	1
Total	4	4	2	10

== Results ==
=== Women ===
==== Summaries ====
Year	Hosts	Final			3rd Place Match		
Year	Hosts	Champions	Score	Runners-up	3rd Place	Score	4th Place
2016	Melbourne, VIC	Australia	7–3 (aggregate)	India	only two teams		
2017	Melbourne, VIC	Netherlands	5–0	Japan	Australia	5–0	United States
2024	Perth, WA	China	round–robin	Australia	Australia Development	round–robin	Japan

==== Team appearances ====
Team	2016	2017	2024	Total
Australia	1st	3rd	2nd	3
Australia Development	–	–	3rd	1
China	–	–	1st	1
India	2nd	–	–	1
Japan	–	2nd	4th	2
Netherlands	–	1st	–	1
United States	–	4th	–	1
Total	2	4	4	10
