= Jagdish Gill =

Indian field hockey player

Personal information
- Born: December 5, 1984 (age 41) Calcutta, India
- Height: 175 cm (5 ft 9 in)
- Weight: 77 kg (170 lb)

Sport
- Country: Canada
- Sport: Field hockey
Medal record
Men's field hockey
Representing Canada
Pan American Games
Silver medal – second place	2015 Toronto	Team
Silver medal – second place	2011 Guadalajara	Team

Jagdish Gill (born December 5, 1984, in Calcutta, India) is an Indian-born Canadian field hockey player, who played for the Canada national field hockey team at the 2015 Pan American Games and won a silver medal.

In 2016, he was named to Canada's Olympic team.
