= Valley Hockey Club =

Australian field hockey club

The Valley Hockey Club is an amateur Australian field hockey club based in the city of Brisbane, the capital of the state of Queensland. The club was founded in 1921 and has produced more Australian players than any other club in Australia.

== History ==
Valley were the first club formed in Queensland in 1921 after an ad was placed in a local Brisbane newspaper seeking to people interested in playing hockey. Six people answered the ad and from that training began. They also approached the military one night at the Boundary Street Drill Hall when the N.C.O's were receiving instruction and a team was formed on the spot. A competition started when several other teams were formed. The members of the team were obsessed with hockey and trained 5 nights a week and all day Sunday sometimes. Club member, Col Cormie, was the founder of Junior and Schoolboy Hockey in Brisbane in 1928. Also in 1928, at the request of the Q.H.A, the top Valley team was split up to make the competition more even. It was reasoned that the fairest way that this could be done was to cut the team down the centre with the centre-forward going in the opposite side to the centre-half and tossing for the goal-keeper. Both teams were fielded in "A" Grade. From the Association's point of view the split did not have the desired effect, as the teams were Premiers and Runners-up in 1928–29 and 30, and were only beaten by each other, making a record of seven years unbeaten by any other club. At this time also the club had created what was believed then to be a world's record for any field game - twelve successive "A" Grade Premierships.

The Diehards have played in a fixture competition under the auspices of Brisbane Hockey Association Inc. since 1932. They have won twenty three premierships during their Seventy Five years in competition, making them the league's most successful club.
