= Aaron Hopkins =

Australian field hockey player

Personal information
- Born: 12 September 1979 (age 46) Busselton, Western Australia
Medal record
Men's field hockey
Representing Australia
World Cup
Silver medal – second place	2002 Kuala Lumpur	Team
Silver medal – second place	2006 Mönchengladbach	Team
Champions Trophy
Gold medal – first place	2005 Chennai	Team
Silver medal – second place	2001 Rotterdam	Team
Silver medal – second place	2003 Amstelveen	Team
Silver medal – second place	2007 Kuala Lumpur	Team
Commonwealth Games
Gold medal – first place	2002 Manchester	Team
Gold medal – first place	2006 Melbourne	Team

Aaron Hopkins (born 12 September 1979 in Busselton, Western Australia) is a field hockey defender from Australia. He narrowly missed selection in Australia's Olympic Games squads in both 2004 and 2008.Aaron Hopkins is a father of two children. He did, however, win two gold medals for Australia at the 2002 and 2006 Commonwealth Games.

== International tournaments ==
- 2001 – Champions Trophy, Rotterdam (2nd)
- 2002 – World Cup, Kuala Lumpur (2nd)
- 2002 – Commonwealth Games, Manchester (1st)
- 2003 – Champions Trophy, Amstelveen (2nd)
- 2005 – Champions Trophy, Chennai (1st)
- 2006 – Commonwealth Games, Melbourne (1st)
