= Paul Gaudoin =

Australian field hockey player

Personal information
- Full name: Paul Charles Gaudoin
- Born: 12 August 1975 (age 50) Perth, Western Australia
- Height: 172 cm (5 ft 8 in)
- Weight: 73 kg (161 lb)
Medal record
Men's field hockey
Representing Australia
Olympic Games
Bronze medal – third place	1996 Atlanta	Team
Bronze medal – third place	2000 Sydney	Team
Champions Trophy
Gold medal – first place	1999 Brisbane	Team
Commonwealth Games
Gold medal – first place	1998 Kuala Lumpur	Team
Gold medal – first place	2002 Manchester	Team

Paul Charles Gaudoin (born 12 August 1975) is an Australian former field hockey defender and midfielder. He was a member of the Australia men's national field hockey team that won bronze at the 1996 Summer Olympics in Atlanta and the 2000 Summer Olympics in Sydney. He was captain of the team that won gold at the 2002 Commonwealth Games.

Gaudoin took over as coach of the Australia women's national field hockey team at the end of 2016 and lifted the Hockeyroos to second on the world rankings three years later. He quit in March 2021, just four months out from the Tokyo Olympics, ahead of the release of findings and recommendations of an independent review into the team's cultural problems.
