= Tristram Woodhouse =

Australian field hockey player

Tristram Woodhouse (born 13 June 1974) is a former field hockey forward from Australia, who made his debut for the Men's National Team in 2003 in a Test series against the Netherlands. That was in the second match of the test series in Canberra. Woodhouse scored his maiden goal in Australia's 3–3 draw in Buderim against the Dutch. In 2003, he competed in the Champions Trophy, where the team won a silver medal. He was also a member of the successful Kookaburra team when they won a gold medal at the Azlan Shah tournament in Malaysia in 2004.

He was the SmokeFree WA Thundersticks' top goal scorer in the 2002 Australian Hockey League (AHL). He won 3 gold medals and three silver medals for his 6-year AHL career.

Tristram recently retired from first-grade hockey at UWA Hockey Club, playing 267 First Grade matches for The University of Western Australia Hockey Club and scored 302 goals in his career. He has recently been awarded Life membership at the University Hockey Club for his 14-year service to the club.

From 2007 to 2009, he coached at Wimbledon Hockey Club, London where he is the "Director of Hockey". He also worked at King's College School, where he is involved with the development of juniors.
