= Brisbane Hockey Association =

Brisbane Hockey Association (BHA) is the governing body for the sport of men's hockey in Brisbane, Australia. It is responsible for the administration of men's and boy's competitions, representative teams, officials and the financial position of the sport. It's located in the Queensland State Hockey Centre in Colmslie, a suburb south of Brisbane.

== Clubs ==
The following clubs compete in the Brisbane Hockey Association

- Bulimba Hockey Club
- Commercial Hockey Club
- Eastern Suburbs Hockey Club
- Kedron Wavell Services Hockey Club
- Labrador Hockey Club
- Northern Suburbs Hockey Club
- Pine Hills Hockey Club
- Pine Rivers St Andrews Hockey Club
- Queensland Police Hockey Club
- QUT Hockey Club
- Redcliffe Leagues Hockey Club
- Southbank Strikers Hockey Club
- South West United Hockey Club
- University of Queensland Hockey Club
- Valley Hockey Club
