= Matt Naylor =

Australian field hockey player

Personal information
- Born: 5 May 1983 (age 43) Bathurst, New South Wales, Australia

Sport
- Country: Australia
- Sport: Hockey
- Team: The Kookaburras
Medal record
Men's field hockey
Representing Australia
World Cup
Silver medal – second place	2006 Mönchengladbach	Team
Champions Trophy
Gold medal – first place	2005 Chennai	Team
Silver medal – second place	2007 Kuala Lumpur	Team

Matthew ("Matt") Geoffrey Naylor (born 5 May 1983 in Bathurst, New South Wales) is a field hockey midfielder from Australia, who made his international senior debut for the national team in 2005 at the Hamburg Masters against the Netherlands. The mechanic was a member of The Kookaburras, the team that won the golden medal at the 2005 Champions Trophy.
