= Andrew Smith (field hockey) =

Australian field hockey player

Medal record

Men's field hockey

Representing Australia

Olympic Games
Bronze medal – third place	2008 Beijing	Team

World Cup
Silver medal – second place	2002 Kuala Lumpur	Team

Champions Trophy
Gold medal – first place	2005 Chennai	Team
Gold medal – first place	2008 Rotterdam	Team
Silver medal – second place	2007 Kuala Lumpur	Team

Andrew Smith (born 1 November 1978 in Wollongong, New South Wales) is an Australian former field hockey striker. He played in two games at the 2008 Beijing Games, where the Kookaburras won the bronze medal. From 2011 until 2020 he was employed as a teacher and head coach of the hockey program at Maribyrnong College. He was employed as a Physical Education teacher at the start of 2021 for Nhulunbuy Christian College in Nhulunbuy.
