= Territory Stingers =

Australian field hockey club

NT Stingers
- Full name: NT Stingers
- League: Malaysia Hockey League
- Founded: 1993; 33 years ago
- Home ground: Marrara Hockey Centre, Marrara, Australia (Capacity 5,000)

Personnel
- Owner: Northern Territory Hockey Association
- Website: hockeynt.asn.au

The NT Stingers are an Australian professional field hockey club based in Darwin, Northern Territory. The club was established in 1993, as part of the Australian Hockey League.

The club have not competed competitively since 2018. They are currently in a rebuilding phase, with a main goal of joining the JDH Hockey One League in 2025.

== History ==
The NT Stingers were founded in 1993, under the women's team, the NT Pearls. A men's team was founded in 1998, under the name the NT Stingers. The two teams competed each year in the Australian Hockey League, until its disbandment in 2018.

The club could not afford to join the JDH Hockey One League in 2019, therefore they do not currently compete competitively, rather, hosting a Festival of Hockey each year.

The Territory Stingers will part in the Malaysian domestic season Malaysia Hockey League in 2025.

Both the men's and women's Northern Territory representative teams entered the AHL at different times. While the women joined in the tournament's inaugural year of 1993, the men didn't join until 1998.

While participating for the first three years, the women's team were absent from the AHL between 1996 and 1999.

The men and women have both previously represented NT under different names. The men have represented as the Territory Stingers (2001–2008) and the Darwin Stingers (2010, 2012), while the women have represented as the Darwin Blazez (1993–1995) and the Territory Pearls (2006–2007, 2010).

== Squads ==
=== Men's squad ===
- Aiden Able
- Dominic Andrade
- Luke Broadway
- Lucas Camra
- Joel Carroll
- Jhye Clarke
- Cameron Cooke
- Robert Duguid
- Billy Fahy
- Calvin Farmilo
- Isaac Farmilo
- Tarrant Haami-Jones
- Jeremy Hayward
- Leon Hayward
- Karl Hochman
- Nathan Hochman
- Jamie Hullick
- Adrian Lockley
- Mitchell Lockley
- Adam Luck
- Khaden Mallett
- Jeremy Mayne
- Ethan MacDonald
- Jayden McGregor
- Mitchell Northcote
- Ayden Parkin
- Jonathon Peris
- Zach Rakkas
- Jason Talbot
- Lachlan Walters
- Huw Wiltshire

=== Women's squad ===
- Sydney Auld
- Krista Bilato
- Elly Buckley
- Jemma Buckley
- Koda Carne
- Niesha Casimiro
- Emily Chaffey
- Isobel Cowell
- Tiana Crompton
- Macenzee Dixon
- Ash D'Souza
- Elizabeth Duguid
- Kirstin Dwyer
- Isabella Gill
- Sally Howies
- Stacey Luck
- Natalie Lynch
- Jessica Martin-Brown
- Lauren Mutton
- Camille O'Conor
- Isabelle O'Conor
- Kiare-Lee Pavy
- Brooke Peris
- Destiny Peris
- Elle Richardson
- Josie Short
- Amy Stripling
- Jayde Taylor
- Zita Varatharajan
- Eliza Pridham
