= Glenn Simpson (field hockey) =

Australian field hockey player (born 1987)

Personal information
- Nickname: Simmo
- Nationality: Australian
- Born: 5 May 1987 (age 39) Melbourne, Victoria

Sport
- Country: Australia
- Sport: Field hockey
- Event: Men's team
Medal record
Men's field hockey
Representing Australia
Champions Trophy
Gold medal – first place	2011 Auckland	Team
Gold medal – first place	2012 Melbourne	Team
Bronze medal – third place	2014 Bhubaneswar	Team

Glenn Simpson (born 5 May 1987) is an Australian field hockey player. He plays for the Victorian Vikings in the Australian Hockey League. He is a member of the Australia men's national field hockey team, and in 2011 he won a gold medal in the Champions Trophy.

He is currently sponsored by Ritual Hockey.

== Personal ==
Simpson was born on 5 May 1987 and is from Melbourne, Victoria. When not playing hockey, he is an electrician.

== Field hockey ==
Simpson started playing hockey as a seven-year-old and played junior hockey for Greensborough. As a junior player for Victoria, he was a member of a team that won the U21 national championships. He plays for the Victorian Vikings in the Australian Hockey League, where is guernsey number is 21. He played for the team in the first found of the 2011 season.

=== National team ===
Simpson is a member of the Australia men's national field hockey team. His first national team cap was in February 2009 in a game against Belgium played in Canberra. As of early 2012, he had 23 international caps and 6 international goals. New national team coach Ric Charlesworth named him and thirteen new players who had less than ten national team caps alongside current players to the squad before in April 2009 in a bid to ready the team for the 2010 Commonwealth Games. In 2009, he was a member of the national team during a five-game test series in Kuala Lumpur, Malaysia against Malaysia. In May 2011, he played in the Azlan Shah Cup for Australia. The Cup featured teams from Pakistan, Malaysia, India, South Korea, Britain and New Zealand. In 2011, he won a gold medal in the Champions Trophy. The Spanish side in the final challenged his play but their challenge was not supported by video replay. In December 2011, he was named as one of twenty-eight players to be on the 2012 Summer Olympics Australian men's national training squad. This squad will be narrowed in June 2012. He trained with the team from 18 January to mid-March in Perth, Western Australia. In February during the training camp, he played in a four nations test series with the teams being the Kookaburras, Australia A Squad, the Netherlands and Argentina. He played for Kookaburras during the series. He scored a goal in his team's 2–1 victory over the Netherlands.

His national team teammates call him Simmo.
