= 2023 Men's Hockey One =

Hockey Australia's national league, third season

2023 Men's JDH Hockey One
Tournament details
- Host country: Australia
- Dates: 6 October – 26 November
- Teams: 7
- Venue: 7 (in 7 host cities)

Final positions
- Champions: (Queensland) Brisbane Blaze (1st title)
- Runner-up: (New South Wales) NSW Pride
- Third place: (Victoria (state)) HC Melbourne

Tournament statistics
- Matches played: 25
- Goals scored: 154 (6.16 per match)
- Top scorer: (New South Wales) Blake Govers (14 goals)

The 2023 Men's JDH Hockey One was the third season of Hockey Australia's national league, Hockey One. The tournament was held across 7 states and territories of Australia. Competition commenced on 6 October, and culminated with a finals weekend on 25 and 26 November in Canberra.

== Competition format ==
=== Format ===
The 2023 Hockey One season followed the same format as previous season. Teams will play a series of home and away matches during the pool stage, which will be followed by a classification round.

During the pool stage, teams play each other once in either a home or a way fixture. The top four ranked teams will qualify for the classification round, playing in two semi-finals with the winners contesting the final and losers the third place match. Like the previous season, the finals will be held over a single weekend at a central location.

=== Rules ===
In addition to FIH sanctioned rules, Hockey Australia is implementing the following rules for Hockey One:

- When a field goal or penalty stroke is scored the same athlete will have an automatic one-on-one shootout with the goalkeeper for an extra goal.
- Outright winner: There will be no drawn games. In the event of a draw, teams will contest a penalty shoot-out to determine a winner.

=== Point allocation ===
Match points will be distributed as follows:

- 5 points: win
- 3 points: shoot-out win
- 2 points: shoot-out loss
- 0 points: loss

== Participating teams ==
The seven teams competing in the league come from Australia's states and territories, with the Northern Territory being the only team absent.

(South Australia) Adelaide Fire

Head Coach: Roel van Maastright

1. Kieran Govers
2. Connor Richmond-Spouse
3. Lucas Toonen
4. Jack Holland
6. Matthew Magann
7. Peter Scott
8. Brodie Gleeson
9. Fred Gray
10. Lachlan Arniel
11. Kyton Rayner
12. Mitchell Dell
13. Alastair Oliver
14. Fraser Heigh
15. Paxton Silby
16. Hugh Snowden
17. Charl Ulrich
18. Richard Hancock
20. Chris Wells
21. Jed Snowden (GK)
22. Edward Chittleborough (GK)
23. Hassan Singh
25. Jethro Eustice
(Queensland) Brisbane Blaze

Head Coach: Matthew Wells

1. William Mathison
2. Shane Kenny
3. Corey Weyer
4. Noah Fahy
5. Lucas Brown
6. Joshua Mynott
7. Liam Hart
9. Jacob Anderson
10. Cale Cramer
11. Michael Francis
12. Jacob Whetton
13. David Hubbard
15. Jayden Atkinson
16. Timothy Howard
17. Scott Boyde
18. Aaron Weiss
19. Luke Randle (GK)
21. Max Harding
23. Daniel Beale
24. Diarmid Chapple
27. Joel Rintala
32. Mitchell Nicholson (GK)
(Australian Capital Territory) Canberra Chill

Head Coach: Seyi Onitiri

2. Benjamin Staines
3. Anand Gupte
4. Jaume Torras
5. Jesse Absolom
6. Connor Tuddenham
8. Sean Baker
9. Jamie Hawke
10. Owen Chivers
11. Garry Backhus
12. Jake Staines
14. Koby Johnstone
15. Hayden Dillon
16. Oscar Smart
17. Aiden Dooley
18. Jeremy Hopkins
22. Jay MacDonald
24. Davis Atkin
26. James Jewell
27. Max Robson
29. Fletcher Norris
32. Brendan Hill (GK)
33. Rupinder Pal Singh
(Victoria (state)) HC Melbourne

Head Coach: Andrew Smith

1. Craig Marais
2. Frazer Gerrard
3. George McGeogh (GK)
4. Liam Henderson
5. Douglas Buckley
6. Damon Steffens
7. Nathan Ephraums
8. Lachlan Steinfort
9. Nathan Copey
10. Bradley Marais
11. Cooper Burns
12. Connar Ottarbach
13. Jayshaan Randhawa
14. James Knee
15. Joshua Simmonds
16. Luke Noblett
17. Kiran Arunasalam
18. Johan Durst (GK)
19. Jordan Rees
20. Nye Roberts
21. Carlin Walker
22. Benjamin White
(New South Wales) NSW Pride

Head Coach: Brent Livermore

1. Lachlan Sharp
2. Thomas Craig
3. Nathan Ackroyd (GK)
5. Ashleigh Thomas (GK)
6. Matthew Dawson
7. Daine Richards
8. Nathaniel Stewart
9. Nathan Czinner
13. Blake Govers
14. Dylan Martin
15. Miles Davis
19. Jack Hayes
20. Ky Willott
22. Flynn Ogilvie
23. Ryan Woolnough
28. Samuel Gray
29. Timothy Brand
32. Callum Mackay
33. Samuel Mudford
34. Thomas Miotto
35. Rory Walker
36. Michael Taylor
(Western Australia) Perth Thundersticks

Head Coach: Craig Wilson

1. Matthew Bird
2. William Battistessa
3. Timothy Geers
4. Jake Harvie
5. Thomas Wickham
6. Bryn de Bes
7. Tyler Lovell (GK)
8. Marshall Puzey
9. James Day
10. Joshua Bowen
11. Thomas Harvie
12. Alistair Murray
13. Brayden King
14. Matthew Willis
15. Liam Flynn
16. Brodee Foster
17. Aran Zalewski (C)
18. Benjamin Rennie (GK)
20. Frank Main
23. Cambell Geddes
25. Trent Mitton
26. James Collins
(Tasmania) Tassie Tigers

Head Coach: Stephen McMullen

1. Magnus McCausland (GK)
2. Tyler McDonald
3. Alexander Shaw
4. Hayden Beltz
5. Ewan Vickery
6. Joshua Brooks
7. Joshua Mardell
8. Joseph Murphy
9. Jeremy Edwards
10. Ruben Hoey
11. Edward Ockenden
12. Samuel McCulloch
13. Joshua Beltz
14. Jack Welch
19. Timothy Deavin
20. Ehren Hazell
23. Henry Chambers (GK)
25. Max Larkin (GK)
27. Gobindraj Gill
28. Lachlan Rogers
30. Alistair White
32. Jeremy Hayward

== Venues ==
Sydney	Melbourne	Perth
Sydney Olympic Park	Melbourne Sports Centre	Perth Hockey Stadium
Capacity: 8,000	Capacity: 8,000	Capacity: 6,000
Adelaide	2023 Men's Hockey One is located in Australia	
MATE Stadium	2023 Men's Hockey One is located in Australia	
Capacity: 4,000	2023 Men's Hockey One is located in Australia	
Brisbane	2023 Men's Hockey One is located in Australia	
State Hockey Centre	2023 Men's Hockey One is located in Australia	
Capacity: 2,000	2023 Men's Hockey One is located in Australia	
Canberra	2023 Men's Hockey One is located in Australia	
National Hockey Centre	2023 Men's Hockey One is located in Australia	
Hobart	2023 Men's Hockey One is located in Australia	
Tasmanian Hockey Centre	2023 Men's Hockey One is located in Australia	

== Results ==
=== Preliminary round ===
Pos	Team	Pld	W	WD	LD	L	GF	GA	GD	Pts	Qualification
1	(New South Wales) NSW Pride	6	5	1	0	0	32	12	+20	28	Semi-finals
2	(Queensland) Brisbane Blaze	6	5	0	0	1	32	15	+17	25	Semi-finals
3	(Victoria (state)) HC Melbourne	6	3	0	0	3	19	22	−3	15	Semi-finals
4	(Tasmania) Tassie Tigers	6	2	0	1	3	12	14	−2	12	Semi-finals
5	(South Australia) Adelaide Fire	6	2	0	1	3	13	25	−12	12	
6	(Western Australia) Perth Thundersticks	6	2	0	0	4	12	17	−5	10	
7	(Australian Capital Territory) Canberra Chill	6	0	1	0	5	11	26	−15	3	

Source: Hockey One
Rules for classification: 1) points; 2) matches won; 3) goal difference; 4) goals for; 5) head-to-head result; 6) field goals scored.

==== Fixtures ====
6 October 2023
20:00 (AEDT)

Tassie Tigers (Tasmania)	1–4	(Victoria (state)) HC Melbourne
Hayward 55'	Report	Burns 15'; Steffens 30+', 41'; Ephraums 57'

Tasmanian Hockey Centre, Hobart
Umpires:
Jayden Pearson (AUS)
Aaron Kitchener (AUS)

7 October 2023
15:30 (AWST)

Perth Thundersticks (Western Australia)	4–1	(Australian Capital Territory) Canberra Chill
Day 14', 30', 33'; Wickham 17'	Report	B. Staines 19'

Perth Hockey Stadium, Perth
Umpires:
Daniel Johnston (AUS)
Jordan Moore (AUS)

8 October 2023
14:30 (ACDT)

Adelaide Fire (South Australia)	2–10	(Queensland) Brisbane Blaze
Heigh 6', 14'	Report	Cramer 3', 3', 19'; Anderson 20', 20', 28', 28'; Chappell 32', 32', 45'

MATE Stadium, Adelaide
Umpires:
Coen van Bunge (NED)
Timothy Sheahan (AUS)

13 October 2023
20:00 (AEDT)

HC Melbourne (Victoria (state))	2–3	(South Australia) Adelaide Fire
Burns 5'; Simmonds 36'	Report	Rayner 45+'; Holland 57', 60'

Melbourne Sports Centre, Melbourne
Umpires:
James Unkles (AUS)
Timothy Sheahan (AUS)

14 October 2023
20:00 (AEST)

Brisbane Blaze (Queensland)	3–7	(New South Wales) NSW Pride
Anderson 53', 53'; Weyer 58'	Report	Brand 1', 1'; Craig 19'; Willott 28'; Hayes 31', 31'; Govers 34'

State Hockey Centre, Brisbane
Umpires:
Aaron Gotting (AUS)
Stephen Rogers (AUS)

15 October 2023
14:00 (AEDT)

Canberra Chill (Australian Capital Territory)	0–7	(Tasmania) Tassie Tigers
	Report	Edwards 1'; McCulloch 3', 3', 26', 26'; Welch 21'; Hazell 56'

National Hockey Centre, Canberra
Umpires:
Stirling Sharpe (AUS)
Zeke Newman (AUS)

20 October 2023
20:00 (AEDT)

Tassie Tigers (Tasmania)	2–1	(Western Australia) Perth Thundersticks
Hayward 12', 25'	Report	Wickham 30'

Tasmanian Hockey Centre, Hobart
Umpires:
Jayden Pearson (AUS)
Aaron Kitchener (AUS)

21 October 2023
19:30 (ACDT)

Adelaide Fire (South Australia)	2–2	(Australian Capital Territory) Canberra Chill
Heigh 50', 50'	Report	Rupinder Pal 13', 45'
Penalties
Scott (penalty shoot-out scored); Heigh (penalty shoot-out missed); Gray (penalty shoot-out missed); Ulrich (penalty shoot-out missed)	1–3	(penalty shoot-out scored) Hawke; (penalty shoot-out missed) Tuddenham; (penalty shoot-out scored) Atkin; (penalty shoot-out scored) Rupinder Pal

MATE Stadium, Adelaide
Umpires:
Aaron Gotting (AUS)
James Unkles (AUS)

22 October 2023
15:00 (AEDT)

NSW Pride (New South Wales)	11–2	(Victoria (state)) HC Melbourne
Ogilvie 4', 4'; Govers 12', 12', 39', 42'; Brand 42'; Hayes 45+'; Willott 55', 55'; Richards 55'	Report	Ephraums 38', 38'

Sydney Olympic Park, Sydney
Umpires:
Neke Newman (AUS)
Benjamin de Young (AUS)

27 October 2023
20:00 (AEST)

Brisbane Blaze (Queensland)	5–0	(Tasmania) Tassie Tigers
Boyde 35', 35'; Randle 43'; Anderson 58', 58'	Report

State Hockey Centre, Brisbane
Umpires:
Benjamin de Young (AUS)
Aaron Gotting (AUS)

28 October 2023
16:30 (AEDT)

Canberra Chill (Australian Capital Territory)	2–3	(New South Wales) NSW Pride
B. Staines 56', 56'	Report	Miotto 45'; Craig 49'; Davis 54'

National Hockey Centre, Canberra
Umpires:
Zeke Newman (AUS)
Benjamin Hocking (AUS)

29 October 2023
15:00 (AWST)

Perth Thundersticks (Western Australia)	2–6	(Victoria (state)) HC Melbourne
Zalewski 25'; Day 29'	Report	Ephraums 14', 44'; Otterbach 18', 18'; Rees 30+'; Steffens 53'

Perth Hockey Stadium, Perth
Umpires:
Daniel Johnston (AUS)
Jordan Moore (AUS)

3 November 2023
20:00 (AEDT)

HC Melbourne (Victoria (state))	1–3	(Queensland) Brisbane Blaze
White 33'	Report	Cramer 9'; Boyde 41', 41'

Melbourne Sports Centre, Melbourne
Umpires:
James Unkles (AUS)
Benjamin de Young (AUS)

4 November 2023
18:30 (AEDT)

NSW Pride (New South Wales)	1–1	(Tasmania) Tassie Tigers
Willott 24'	Report	H. Beltz 60+'
Penalties
Willott (penalty shoot-out scored); Ogilvie (penalty shoot-out scored); Hayes (penalty shoot-out scored); Craig (penalty shoot-out missed); Richards (penalty shoot-out scored); Willott (penalty shoot-out scored)	5–4	(penalty shoot-out scored) McCulloch; (penalty shoot-out scored) Welch; (penalty shoot-out missed) Hayward; (penalty shoot-out scored) H. Beltz; (penalty shoot-out scored) Edwards; (penalty shoot-out missed) Welch

Sydney Olympic Park, Sydney
Umpires:
Zeke Newman (AUS)
Stephen Rogers (AUS)

5 November 2023
15:00 (ACDT)

Adelaide Fire (South Australia)	0–3	(Western Australia) Perth Thundersticks
	Report	Willis 19', 19'; Day 60'

MATE Stadium, Adelaide
Umpires:
Aleisha Neumann (AUS)
Benjamin Hocking (AUS)

10 November 2023
20:00 (AEDT)

Canberra Chill (Australian Capital Territory)	4–6	(Queensland) Brisbane Blaze
B. Staines 38', 38', 48', 48'	Report	Weyer 49'; Chappell 49'; Hart 59', 59'; Francis 59', 59'

National Hockey Centre, Canberra
Umpires:
Stephen Rogers (AUS)
Timothy Sheahan (AUS)

11 November 2023
18:30 (AEDT)

Tassie Tigers (Tasmania)	1–3	(South Australia) Adelaide Fire
Hayward 7'	Report	H. Snowden 22'; Heigh 23', 41'

Tasmanian Hockey Centre, Hobart
Umpires:
Jayden Pearson (AUS)
Aaron Kitchener (AUS)

12 November 2023
13:30 (AWST)

Perth Thundersticks (Western Australia)	1–3	(New South Wales) NSW Pride
Wickham 57'	Report	Ogilvie 35', 35'; Govers 44'

Perth Hockey Stadium, Perth
Umpires:
Daniel Johnston (AUS)
Jordan Moore (AUS)

17 November 2023
18:30 (AEDT)

HC Melbourne (Victoria (state))	4–2	(Australian Capital Territory) Canberra Chill
Knee 27'; Henderson 32', 32'; Simmonds 35'	Report	Tuddenham 49', 49'

Melbourne Sports Centre, Melbourne
Umpires:
Benjamin Hocking (AUS)
James Unkles (AUS)

18 November 2023
20:00 (AEDT)

NSW Pride (New South Wales)	7–3	(South Australia) Adelaide Fire
Govers 2'; Brand 20'; Craig 20', 50', 50'; Richards 34', 34'	Report	Rayner 25'; Heigh 40', 60'

Sydney Olympic Park, Sydney
Umpires:
Zeke Newman (AUS)
Daniel Johnston (AUS)

19 November 2023
14:00 (AEST)

Brisbane Blaze (Queensland)	5–1	(Western Australia) Perth Thundersticks
Weyer 4'; Rintala 13', 30', 30'; Chappell 56'	Report	Day 43'

State Hockey Centre, Brisbane
Umpires:
Aaron Gotting (AUS)
Stephen Rogers (AUS)

=== Classification round ===
Semi-finals
25 November
(New South Wales) NSW Pride	6
(Tasmania) Tassie Tigers	2
25 November
(Queensland) Brisbane Blaze (pen.)	3 (10)
(Victoria (state)) HC Melbourne	3 (9)

Final
26 November
(New South Wales) NSW Pride	3 (3)
(Queensland) Brisbane Blaze (pen.)	3 (5)
Third place
26 November
(Tasmania) Tassie Tigers	1
(Victoria (state)) HC Melbourne	2

==== Semi-finals ====
25 November 2023
12:30

NSW Pride (New South Wales)	6–2	(Tasmania) Tassie Tigers
Govers 8', 9', 23', 52'; Brand 59', 59'	Report	Hayward 13'; Gill 34'

National Hockey Centre, Canberra
Umpires:
Stephen Rogers (AUS)
James Unkles (AUS)

25 November 2023
16:00

Brisbane Blaze (Queensland)	3–3	(Victoria (state)) HC Melbourne
Cramer 13'; Boyde 37', 37'	Report	Davis 8', 40', 40'
Penalties
Boyde (penalty shoot-out scored); Beale (penalty shoot-out scored); Rintala (penalty shoot-out scored); Whetton (penalty shoot-out missed); Weyer (penalty shoot-out scored); Boyde (penalty shoot-out missed); Weyer (penalty shoot-out scored); Beale (penalty shoot-out scored); Whetton (penalty shoot-out scored); Rintala (penalty shoot-out scored); Weyer (penalty shoot-out missed); Boyde (penalty shoot-out scored); Beale (penalty shoot-out scored)	10–9	(penalty shoot-out scored) Simmonds; (penalty shoot-out missed) Simmonds; (penalty shoot-out scored) Ephraums; (penalty shoot-out scored) Otterbach; (penalty shoot-out scored) Arunasalam; (penalty shoot-out missed) Ephraums; (penalty shoot-out scored) White; (penalty shoot-out scored) Simmonds; (penalty shoot-out scored) Simmonds; (penalty shoot-out scored) B. Marais; (penalty shoot-out missed) Ephraums; (penalty shoot-out scored) White; (penalty shoot-out missed) Otterbach

National Hockey Centre, Canberra
Umpires:
Zeke Newman (AUS)
Aaron Gotting (AUS)

==== Third and fourth place ====
26 November 2023
13:00

Tassie Tigers (Tasmania)	1–2	(Victoria (state)) HC Melbourne
Hayward 15+'	Report	Simmonds 17'; White 45'

National Hockey Centre, Canberra
Umpires:
James Unkles (AUS)
Aaron Gotting (AUS)

==== Final ====
26 November 2023
17:30

NSW Pride (New South Wales)	3–3	(Queensland) Brisbane Blaze
Govers 20', 52', 60'	Report	Cramer 17', 17'; Weyer 24'
Penalties
Brand (penalty shoot-out scored); Ogilvie (penalty shoot-out missed); Willott (penalty shoot-out scored); Govers (penalty shoot-out scored)	3–5	(penalty shoot-out scored) Boyde; (penalty shoot-out scored) Weyer; (penalty shoot-out scored) Rintala; (penalty shoot-out scored) Beale; (penalty shoot-out scored) Whetton

National Hockey Centre, Canberra
Umpires:
Stephen Rogers (AUS)
Zeke Newman (AUS)

== Final standings ==
Pos	Team	Pld	W	WD	LD	L	GF	GA	GD	Pts	Final standing
1st place, gold medalist(s)	(Queensland) Brisbane Blaze	8	5	2	0	1	38	21	+17	31	Gold Medal
2nd place, silver medalist(s)	(New South Wales) NSW Pride	8	6	1	1	0	41	17	+24	35	Silver Medal
3rd place, bronze medalist(s)	(Victoria (state)) HC Melbourne	8	4	0	1	3	24	26	−2	22	Bronze Medal
4	(Tasmania) Tassie Tigers	8	2	0	1	5	15	22	−7	12	Fourth Place
5	(South Australia) Adelaide Fire	6	2	0	1	3	13	25	−12	12	Eliminated in Group Stage
6	(Western Australia) Perth Thundersticks	6	2	0	0	4	12	17	−5	10	Eliminated in Group Stage
7	(Australian Capital Territory) Canberra Chill	6	0	1	0	5	11	26	−15	3	Eliminated in Group Stage

Source: Hockey Australia

== Goalscorers ==
There were 154 goals scored in 25 matches, for an average of 6.16 goals per match.

14 goals

- (New South Wales) Blake Govers

8 goals

- (Queensland) Jacob Anderson
- (South Australia) Fraser Heigh

7 goals

- (Australian Capital Territory) Benjamin Staines
- (Queensland) Cale Cramer

6 goals

- (New South Wales) Timothy Brand
- (Queensland) Scott Boyde
- (Tasmania) Jeremy Hayward
- (Western Australia) James Day

5 goals

- (New South Wales) Thomas Craig
- (Queensland) Diarmid Chappell
- (Victoria (state)) Nathan Ephraums

4 goals

- (New South Wales) Flynn Ogilvie
- (New South Wales) Ky Willott
- (Queensland) Corey Weyer
- (Tasmania) Samuel McCulloch

3 goals

- (New South Wales) Jack Hayes
- (New South Wales) Daine Richards
- (Queensland) Joel Rintala
- (Victoria (state)) Eden Davis
- (Victoria (state)) Joshua Simmonds
- (Victoria (state)) Damon Steffens
- (Western Australia) Thomas Wickham

2 goals

- (Australian Capital Territory) Rupinder Pal Singh
- (Australian Capital Territory) Connor Tuddenham
- (Queensland) Michael Francis
- (Queensland) Liam Hart
- (Victoria (state)) Cooper Burns
- (Victoria (state)) Liam Henderson
- (Victoria (state)) Connar Otterbach
- (Victoria (state)) Benjamin White
- (South Australia) Jack Holland
- (South Australia) Kyton Rayner
- (Western Australia) Matthew Willis

1 goal

- (New South Wales) Miles Davis
- (New South Wales) Thomas Miotto
- (Queensland) Luke Randle
- (South Australia) Hugh Snowden
- (Tasmania) Hayden Beltz
- (Tasmania) Jeremy Edwards
- (Tasmania) Gobindraj Gill
- (Tasmania) Ehren Hazell
- (Tasmania) Jack Welch
- (Victoria (state)) James Knee
- (Victoria (state)) Jordan Rees
- (Western Australia) Aran Zalewski

Source: Hockey Australia

== Attendances ==
The 2023 Men's Hockey One League season saw several matches attract record crowds, highlighting the league's growing popularity. The highest attendance was recorded in Canberra, where Canberra Chill versus NSW Pride drew a reported 2,282 spectators. Other notably well-attended matches included Brisbane Blaze versus NSW Pride with a crowd of 1,700 and a NSW Pride home fixture in Sydney that attracted 1,600 spectators.

#	Club	Average
1	NSW Pride	1,462
2	Brisbane Blaze	1,358
3	Canberra Chill	1,276
4	HC Melbourne	1,051
5	Perth Thundersticks	923
6	Tassie Tigers	894
7	Adelaide Fire	872
