= 2026 Men's Hockey One =

Hockey Australia's national league, sixth season

Tournament details
- Host country: Australia
- Dates: 8 October – 6 December
- Teams: 8
- Venue: 10 (in 10 host cities)

Tournament statistics
- Matches played: 28
- Goals scored: 220 (7.86 per match)
- Top scorer(s): (Victoria (state)) Cooper Burns (HCM) (Victoria (state)) Nathan Ephraums (HCM) (13 goals)

The 2026 Men's Hockey One is the sixth season of Hockey Australia's national league, Hockey One. The tournament is held across seven states and territories of Australia. Competition commenced on 8 October and will culminate with the finals weekend on 5–6 December.

This season features the introduction of an eighth franchise, the Melbourne Cobras.

== Competition format ==
=== Format ===
The 2026 Hockey One season followed the same format as the previous seasons of the league. Teams will play a series of home and away matches during the Pool Stage, which will be followed by a Classification Round.

During the pool stage, teams played each other once in either a home or a way fixture. The top four ranked teams qualified for the medal round, playing in two semi-finals with the winners contesting the final and losers the third place match.

=== Rules ===
In addition to FIH sanctioned rules, Hockey Australia is implementing the following rules for Hockey One:

- When a field goal or penalty stroke is scored the same athlete will have an automatic one-on-one shootout with the goalkeeper for an extra goal.
- Outright winner: There will be no drawn games. In the event of a draw, teams will contest a penalty shoot-out to determine a winner.

=== Point allocation ===
Match points will be distributed as follows:

- 3 points: win
- 2 points: shoot-out win
- 1 points: shoot-out loss
- 0 points: loss

== Participating teams ==
The eight teams competing in the league come from Australia's states and territories, with the Northern Territory being the only team absent.

(South Australia) Adelaide Fire

Head coach: Daniel Mitchell

2. Jacob Yacono
3. Lucas Noel
4. Jack Holland
6. Lucas Aardenburg
7. Mika Böttger
8. Connor Richmond-Spouse
9. Bryce Hammond
10. Freddy Waters
11. Kyton Rayner
12. Lachlan Arneil
13. Rhun Williams
14. Dylan Holland
15. Charlie Roberts
16. Marc Boltó
17. Aiden Cameron
18. Matthew Argent
19. Fred Gray (C)
20. Ashley Bingle (GK)
21. Zac Profke
23. Hassan Singh
26. Jethro Eustice
32. Seb Foster
33. William Johnson (GK)
35. Joshua Ucinek
96. Damon Leng (GK)
(Queensland) Brisbane Blaze

Head coach: Darren Fowler

1. Lachlan Sharp
2. Shane Kenny
3. Corey Weyer
4. Noah Fahy
5. Cody Hale
6. Kyle Jeffrey-Prestwich
7. Elliot Dale
8. Adam Imer
9. Jacob Anderson
10. Manveer Jhamat
11. William Powell
12. Finnigan Robinson
13. David Hubbard
14. Lucas Toonen
15. Jayden Atkinson
16. Timothy Howard (C)
17. Scott Boyde
18. Mackenzie Warne
20. Thomas Campbell
21. Matthew Hawthorne
22. Matthew Finn (GK)
25. Hayden Pease
27. Joel Rintala
28. Thomas Wycherley
32. Mitchell Nicholson (GK)
(Australian Capital Territory) Canberra Chill

Head coach: Seyi Onitiri

1. Timothy Ehret
2. Benjamin Staines
3. Anand Gupte (C)
4. Ozzie Cameron
5. Jesse Absolom
6. Lachlan Hopkins
7. Thomas Craig
8. Jake McCarthy
10. Peter Crossman
11. Charlie Dorman
12. Jake Staines
13. Dylan Brick (C)
14. Aidan Smith
16. Oscar Smart
17. Aiden Dooley
18. Benjamin Stewart
19. Craig Marais
22. Darcy MacDonald
23. Jay MacDonald
24. Davis Atkin
26. James Jewell (C)
27. Max Robson (GK)
28. Douwe Steens
32. Max Larkin (GK)
33. Hamish Morrison
(Victoria (state)) HC Melbourne

Head coach: Jesse Workman

1. Benjamin White
2. Duncan Jackson
3. Jonathan Bretherton
5. Cooper Burns
6. Damon Steffens
7. Nathan Ephraums
8. Edward Arnold (GK)
9. Oliver Will
10. Bradley Marais
11. Jed Snowden (GK)
12. Connar Otterbach
13. Daniel Smits
14. Joshua Henderson
15. Joshua Simmonds
16. Ky Willott
17. Nicholas Fitzgerald
18. Byron Fernandes
19. Jordan Rees
20. Nye Roberts-Campello
21. Carlin Walker
22. William Carruthers
23. Henry Laussen
24. Connor Tuddenham
25. Joshua Allen
26. Aidan Sarikaya
(Victoria (state)) Melbourne Cobras

Head Coach: David John

1. Oscar Allen
2. Douglas Buckley (GK)
3. Evan Kimber (C)
4. Kade Leigh
5. Trent Symss
6. Eden Davis
7. Gursahibjit Singh
8. Joshua Bretherton
9. Gurjant Singh
10. Raheel Mouseen
11. Hugh Snowden
12. Jacob Whetton
13. Finn Hodder
14. Peter Scott
15. Corey O'Neil
16. William Rutley
17. Benjamin Hooppell (GK)
18. Benjamin Rennie (GK)
19. Samuel Lowndes
20. Kaelan Boundy
21. Jordi Gifra
23. Rohit Mohil
27. Abu Mahmood
52. Max Johnstone
(New South Wales) NSW Pride

Head Coach: Brent Livermore

3. Lain Carr
4. Angus Callinan
5. Ashleigh Thomas (GK)
7. Thomas David (GK)
8. Nathanael Stewart
9. Jack Marshall
10. Kurt Lovett
11. Dylan Downey
12. Jared Findley
13. Blake Govers
14. Dylan Martin
15. Miles Davis
16. Brayden Sutherland
17. Jett Leong
18. Toby Mallon
19. Jack Hayes (C)
22. Ryan Simpson
23. Ryan Woolnough
24. Timothy Shwieren
25. Nathan Czinner
29. Timothy Brand
30. Toby Collins
33. Samuel Mudford
36. Michael Taylor
(Western Australia) Perth Thundersticks

Head Coach: Timothy Geers

1. Samuel Ashton
2. Luke Anderson
3. Hamish Adamson
5. Angus Adamson
6. Charlie Johnston
7. Zach Rakkas
8. Zed Kearnan
9. Johannes Große
10. Max Freedman
11. Thomas Harvie
13. Daykin Stanger
15. Benjamin O'Grady
16. Brodee Foster
17. Jonah Pilatti
19. Ian Grobbelaar
20. Mitchell Pace
22. Flynn Ogilvie
23. Max Nelson
24. Cambell Geddes
25. Ethan Yem
26. James Collins
27. Hunter Banyard (GK)
28. Jaxon Browne
32. Matthew Edwards (GK)
43. Harrison Golding
(Tasmania) Tassie Tigers

Head Coach: Benjamin Read

1. Magnus McCausland (GK)
3. Tyson Johnson
4. Hayden Beltz
5. Matthew Bird
6. Joshua Brooks
7. Ruben Hoey
8. Lex Tump
9. Jeremy Edwards
10. Oliver Stebbings
11. Edward Ockenden (C)
12. Noah Thomas
13. Joshua Beltz
14. Jack Welch
15. Oscar Pritchard
16. Alexander Hogan-Jones
17. Lachlan Rogers
19. Timothy Deavin
20. Ehren Hazell
21. Jack Pritchard
22. Samuel McCulloch
23. Angus McMullen
27. William Sproule
28. Oscar Sproule
31. William Dixon (GK)
77. Keenan Johnson

== Venues ==
Adelaide
State Hockey Centre
Bendigo
Bendigo Hockey Centre
Brisbane
Queensland State Hockey Centre
Canberra
EPC Solar Hockey Stadium
Gold Coast
Gold Coast Hockey Centre
Hobart
Aurora Energy Tasmanian Hockey Centre
Melbourne
State Netball and Hockey Centre
Newcastle
Newcastle International Hockey Centre
Sydney
Sydney Olympic Park
Perth
Perth Hockey Stadium

== Preliminary round ==
=== Standings ===
Pos	Team	Pld	W	WD	LD	L	GF	GA	GD	Pts	Qualification
1	(Victoria (state)) HC Melbourne	7	7	0	0	0	44	15	+29	21	Semi-finals
2	(Tasmania) Tassie Tigers	7	5	0	0	2	35	15	+20	15	Semi-finals
3	(Western Australia) Perth Thundersticks	7	5	0	0	2	29	19	+10	15	Semi-finals
4	(Australian Capital Territory) Canberra Chill	7	4	0	1	2	34	23	+11	13	Semi-finals
5	(New South Wales) NSW Pride	7	3	1	0	3	16	21	−5	11	
6	(Victoria (state)) Melbourne Cobras	7	2	0	0	5	29	37	−8	6	
7	(Queensland) Brisbane Blaze	7	1	0	0	6	24	41	−17	3	
8	(South Australia) Adelaide Fire	7	0	0	0	7	9	49	−40	0	

Source: Hockey One
Rules for classification: 1) points; 2) matches won; 3) goal difference; 4) goals for; 5) head-to-head result; 6) field goals scored.

=== Fixtures ===
8 October 2026
19:45 (AEDT)

Canberra Chill (Australian Capital Territory)	9–1	(South Australia) Adelaide Fire
B. Staines 12', 12'; J. Staines 22', 22', 42', 42'; Brick 26', 49'; J. MacDonald 32'	Report	Singh 24'

EPC Solar Hockey Stadium, Canberra
Umpires:
Toby Power (AUS)
Kristy Robertson (AUS)

9 October 2026
20:15 (AEST)

Brisbane Blaze (Queensland)	3–5	(Victoria (state)) HC Melbourne
Boyde 16', 16', 43'	Report	Burns 9', 22', 37'; Smits 22'; Jackson 46'

Queensland State Hockey Centre, Brisbane
Umpires:
Aleisha Neumann (AUS)
Blake Kroning (AUS)

10 October 2026
16:15 (AEDT)

Tassie Tigers (Tasmania)	4–2	(Western Australia) Perth Thundersticks
Hazell 2'; McCulloch 2'; O. Pritchard 28'; Brooks 30'	Report	Grobbelaar 2'; Foster 53'

Aurora Energy Tasmanian Hockey Centre, Hobart
Umpires:
Jayden Pearson (AUS)
Harrison Winch (AUS)

11 October 2026
16:15 (AEDT)

Melbourne Cobras (Victoria (state))	2–3	(New South Wales) NSW Pride
Snowden 60', 60'	Report	Downey 11'; Czinner 19'; Govers 35'

State Sport Centres, Melbourne
Umpires:
James Unkles (AUS)
Nathan McDonald (AUS)

16 October 2026
18:30 (AEDT)

NSW Pride (New South Wales)	5–3	(Queensland) Brisbane Blaze
Govers 10'; Mudford 19', 19', 37', 37'	Report	Hawthorne 15'; Warne 35'; Wycherley 37'

Newcastle International Hockey Centre, Newcastle
Umpires:
Zeke Newman (AUS)
Gilbert Gough-Fuller (AUS)

17 October 2026
13:00 (AEDT)

HC Melbourne (Victoria (state))	5–2	(Western Australia) Perth Thundersticks
Simmonds 11'; Ephraums 15', 32'; Jackson 42', 42'	Report	Golding 36', 36'

State Sport Centres, Melbourne
Umpires:
James Unkles (AUS)
Harrison Winch (AUS)

17 October 2026
17:00 (AEDT)

Melbourne Cobras (Victoria (state))	2–4	(Australian Capital Territory) Canberra Chill
Mahmood 27'; Raheel 60+'	Report	J. Staines 34'; Jewell 38'; Brick 42'; Dooley 47'

State Sport Centres, Melbourne
Umpires:
Oliver Chauhan (AUS)
Lachlan Avil (AUS)

18 October 2026
13:00 (ACDT)

Adelaide Fire (South Australia)	1–9	(Tasmania) Tassie Tigers
Böttger 4'	Report	Bird 8'; Hazell 18', 18', 45', 45'; McCulloch 20'; Deavin 30'; Hoey 34'; Stebbings 56'

State Hockey Centre, Adelaide
Umpires:
Kristy Robertson (AUS)
Toby Power (AUS)

23 October 2026
18:00 (AEDT)

Tassie Tigers (Tasmania)	3–4	(Australian Capital Territory) Canberra Chill
H. Beltz 34', 46'; Stebbings 60'	Report	Atkin 12'; D. MacDonald 13'; Brick 34', 36'

Aurora Energy Tasmanian Hockey Centre, Hobart
Umpires:
Jayden Pearson (AUS)
Vincent Harman (AUS)

24 October 2026
13:00 (AEDT)

NSW Pride (New South Wales)	1–3	(Western Australia) Perth Thundersticks
Govers 28'	Report	Stanger 11', 12'; Foster 28'

Sydney Olympic Park, Sydney
Umpires:
Zeke Newman (AUS)
Gilbert Gough-Fuller (AUS)

24 October 2026
16:00 (AEST)

Brisbane Blaze (Queensland)	10–1	(South Australia) Adelaide Fire
Wycherley 11'; Fahy 19', 19'; Atkinson 30'; Hale 30'; Pease 35', 37'; Kenny 47'; Hawthorne 57', 57'	Report	Waters 4'

Queensland State Hockey Centre, Brisbane
Umpires:
Blake Kroning (AUS)
Hayden Newell (AUS)

25 October 2026
17:15 (AEDT)

Melbourne Cobras (Victoria (state))	5–8	(Victoria (state)) HC Melbourne
Mahmood 30', 48', 54'; Scott 31', 31'	Report	Ephraums 18', 60', 60'; Steffens 45'; Willott 50', 50'; White 57', 57'

State Sport Centres, Melbourne
Umpires:
Timothy Sheahan (AUS)
Oliver Chauhan (AUS)

30 October 2026
18:00 (AEDT)

Canberra Chill (Australian Capital Territory)	2–10	(Victoria (state)) HC Melbourne
J. Staines 45'; Dooley 58'	Report	Ephraums 4', 4', 5', 58', 58'; Jackson 17', 43'; Burns 20', 27', 27'

EPC Solar Hockey Stadium, Canberra
Umpires:
Kristy Robertson (AUS)
Emily Carroll (AUS)

31 October 2026
14:45 (AEDT)

Tassie Tigers (Tasmania)	4–1	(Queensland) Brisbane Blaze
Stebbings 49', 49'; Hazell 53', 53'	Report	Rintala 12'

Aurora Energy Tasmanian Hockey Centre, Hobart
Umpires:
Jayden Pearson (AUS)
Vincent Harman (AUS)

31 October 2026
19:15 (ACDT)

Adelaide Fire (South Australia)	0–1	(New South Wales) NSW Pride
	Report	Govers 35'

State Hockey Centre, Adelaide
Umpires:
Oliver Chauhan (AUS)
Gilbert Gough-Fuller (AUS)

1 November 2026
15:45 (AWST)

Perth Thundersticks (Western Australia)	6–3	(Victoria (state)) Melbourne Cobras
T. Harvie 12'; Geddes 15', 20'; Golding 36'; Stanger 50', 50'	Report	Whetton 14', 14'; Rohit 33'

Perth Hockey Stadium, Perth
Umpires:
James Unkles (AUS)
Jordan Moore (AUS)

6 November 2026
18:30 (AEDT)

HC Melbourne (Victoria (state))	5–1	(Tasmania) Tassie Tigers
Ephraums 16', 41', 41'; Burns 20', 20'	Report	Welch 26'

State Sport Centres, Melbourne
Umpires:
James Unkles (AUS)
Timothy Sheahan (AUS)

7 November 2026
14:45 (AEDT)

NSW Pride (New South Wales)	3–3	(Australian Capital Territory) Canberra Chill
Govers 19'; Mallon 60', 60'	Report	B. Staines 20'; Brick 30', 35'
Penalties
Brand (penalty shoot-out scored); Czinner (penalty shoot-out scored); Govers (penalty shoot-out scored)	3–1	(penalty shoot-out scored) Craig; (penalty shoot-out missed) Crossman; (penalty shoot-out missed) Absolom; (penalty shoot-out missed) Atkin

Sydney Olympic Park, Sydney
Umpires:
Zeke Newman (AUS)
Gilbert Gough-Fuller (AUS)

7 November 2026
16:15 (AWST)

Perth Thundersticks (Western Australia)	9–2	(Queensland) Brisbane Blaze
T. Harvie 28', 45'; Golding 28'; Foster 42', 42', 45'; Stanger 46', 59', 59'	Report	Weyer 4'; Wycherley 44'

Perth Hockey Stadium, Perth
Umpires:
Jaxon Geddes (AUS)
Jordan Moore (AUS)

8 November 2026
14:45 (AEDT)

Melbourne Cobras (Victoria (state))	10–3	(South Australia) Adelaide Fire
Whetton 9', 9', 58', 58'; Scott 27', 27', 36', 40', 40'; Gursahibjit 53'	Report	Singh 5', 5'; Böttger 23'

Bendigo Hockey Centre, Bendigo
Umpires:
Oliver Chauhan (AUS)
Nathan McDonald (AUS)

13 November 2026
20:15 (AEDT)

HC Melbourne (Victoria (state))	6–2	(New South Wales) NSW Pride
Burns 9', 24', 24', 58', 58'; Steffens 33'	Report	Govers 12'; Brand 57'

State Sport Centres, Melbourne
Umpires:
James Unkles (AUS)
Oliver Chauhan (AUS)

14 November 2026
13:00 (AEDT)

Tassie Tigers (Tasmania)	10–1	(Victoria (state)) Melbourne Cobras
Welch 4', 47', 47'; O. Pritchard 15'; Sproule 23'; Rogers 30', 30', 45'; Hazell 46'; McCulloch 46'	Report	Davis 59'

Aurora Energy Tasmanian Hockey Centre, Hobart
Umpires:
Jayden Pearson (AUS)
Timothy Sheahan (AUS)

14 November 2026
15:30 (AWST)

Perth Thundersticks (Western Australia)	5–3	(South Australia) Adelaide Fire
Grobbelaar 6', 28'; Stanger 53'; Pace 55', 55'	Report	Böttger 21'; Rayner 44', 44'

Perth Hockey Stadium, Perth
Umpires:
Jordan Moore (AUS)
Jaxon Geddes (AUS)

15 November 2026
15:45 (AEST)

Brisbane Blaze (Queensland)	2–11	(Australian Capital Territory) Canberra Chill
Weyer 43'; Hawthorne 51'	Report	Brick 2', 22', 41', 45+'; B. Staines 10', 10', 12'; J. Staines 20', 20'; Craig 58', 58'

Queensland State Hockey Centre, Brisbane
Umpires:
Hayden Newell (AUS)
Hayden Michel (AUS)

20 November 2026
18:30 (AEDT)

NSW Pride (New South Wales)	1–4	(Tasmania) Tassie Tigers
Govers 20'	Report	Hoey 11'; Hazell 14', 14'; McCulloch 49'

Newcastle International Hockey Centre, Newcastle
Umpires:
Gilbert Gough-Fuller (AUS)
Zeke Newman (AUS)

21 November 2026
16:15 (ACDT)

Adelaide Fire (South Australia)	0–5	(Victoria (state)) HC Melbourne
	Report	Tuddenham 4', 4'; Fernandes 52', 52'; Smits 58'

State Hockey Centre, Adelaide
Umpires:
Jordan Moore (AUS)
Jaxon Geddes (AUS)

21 November 2026
18:00 (AEST)

Brisbane Blaze (Queensland)	3–6	(Victoria (state)) Melbourne Cobras
Pease 15'; Toonen 26'; Boyde 60'	Report	Gurjant 4'; Hodder 36', 36', 40', 40'; Rohit 42'

Queensland State Hockey Centre, Brisbane
Umpires:
Hayden Newell (AUS)
Hayden Michel (AUS)

22 November 2026
14:45 (AEDT)

Canberra Chill (Australian Capital Territory)	1–2	(Western Australia) Perth Thundersticks
Brick 9'	Report	Foster 2'; T. Harvie 34'

EPC Solar Hockey Stadium, Canberra
Umpires:
Kristy Robertson (AUS)
Toby Power (AUS)

== Medal round ==
=== Bracket ===
Semi-finals
5 December
(Victoria (state)) HC Melbourne
(Australian Capital Territory) Canberra Chill
5 December
(Tasmania) Tassie Tigers
(Western Australia) Perth Thundersticks

Final
6 December
Winner SF1
Winner SF2
Third place
6 December
Loser SF1
Loser SF2

=== Semi-finals ===
5 December 2026
10:00

HC Melbourne (Victoria (state))	v	(Australian Capital Territory) Canberra Chill
	Report

Gold Coast Hockey Centre, Gold Coast

5 December 2026
13:30

Tassie Tigers (Tasmania)	v	(Western Australia) Perth Thundersticks
	Report

Gold Coast Hockey Centre, Gold Coast

=== Third and fourth place ===
6 December 2026
15:30

Loser SF1	v	Loser SF2
	Report

Gold Coast Hockey Centre, Gold Coast

=== Final ===
6 December 2026
10:30

Winner SF1	v	Winner SF2
	Report

Gold Coast Hockey Centre, Gold Coast

== Goalscorers ==
There have been 220 goals scored in 28 matches, for an average of 7.86 goals per match (as of 21 November 2026).

13 goals

- (Victoria (state)) Cooper Burns (HCM)
- (Victoria (state)) Nathan Ephraums (HCM)

12 goals

- (Australian Capital Territory) Dylan Brick

10 goals

- (Tasmania) Ehren Hazell

8 goals

- (Australian Capital Territory) Jake Staines
- (Western Australia) Daykin Stanger

7 goals

- (Victoria (state)) Peter Scott (MCO)
- (New South Wales) Blake Govers

6 goals

- (Australian Capital Territory) Benjamin Staines
- (Victoria (state)) Jacob Whetton (MCO)
- (Western Australia) Brodee Foster

5 goals

- (Victoria (state)) Duncan Jackson (HCM)

4 goals

- (Queensland) Scott Boyde
- (Queensland) Matthew Hawthorne
- (Victoria (state)) Finn Hodder (MCO)
- (Victoria (state)) Abu Mahmood (MCO)
- (New South Wales) Samuel Mudford
- (Western Australia) Harrison Golding
- (Western Australia) Thomas Harvie
- (Tasmania) Samuel McCulloch
- (Tasmania) Oliver Stebbings
- (Tasmania) Jack Welch

3 goals

- (South Australia) Mika Böttger
- (South Australia) Hassan Singh
- (Queensland) Hayden Pease
- (Queensland) Thomas Wycherley
- (Western Australia) Ian Grobbelaar
- (Tasmania) Lachlan Rogers

2 goals

- (South Australia) Kyton Rayner
- (Queensland) Noah Fahy
- (Queensland) Corey Weyer
- (Australian Capital Territory) Thomas Craig
- (Australian Capital Territory) Aiden Dooley
- (Victoria (state)) Byron Fernandes (HCM)
- (Victoria (state)) Daniel Smits (HCM)
- (Victoria (state)) Damon Steffens (HCM)
- (Victoria (state)) Connor Tuddenham (HCM)
- (Victoria (state)) Benjamin White (HCM)
- (Victoria (state)) Ky Willott (HCM)
- (Victoria (state)) Rohit Mohil (MCO)
- (Victoria (state)) Hugh Snowden (MCO)
- (New South Wales) Toby Mallon
- (Western Australia) Cambell Geddes
- (Western Australia) Mitchell Pace
- (Tasmania) Hayden Beltz
- (Tasmania) Ruben Hoey
- (Tasmania) Oscar Pritchard

1 goal

- (South Australia) Freddy Waters
- (Queensland) Jayden Atkinson
- (Queensland) Cody Hale
- (Queensland) Shane Kenny
- (Queensland) Joel Rintala
- (Queensland) Lucas Toonen
- (Queensland) Mackenzie Warne
- (Australian Capital Territory) Davis Atkin
- (Australian Capital Territory) James Jewell
- (Australian Capital Territory) Darcy MacDonald
- (Australian Capital Territory) Jay MacDonald
- (Victoria (state)) Joshua Pollard (HCM)
- (Victoria (state)) Eden Davis (MCO)
- (Victoria (state)) Raheel Mouseen (MCO)
- (Victoria (state)) Gurjant Singh (MCO)
- (Victoria (state)) Gursahibjit Singh (MCO)
- (New South Wales) Timothy Brand
- (New South Wales) Nathan Czinner
- (New South Wales) Dylan Downey
- (Tasmania) Matthew Bird
- (Tasmania) Joshua Brooks
- (Tasmania) Timothy Deavin
- (Tasmania) Oscar Sproule

Source: Hockey Australia
