= 2024 Men's Hockey One =

Hockey Australia's national league, fourth season

2024 Men's Liberty Hockey One
Tournament details
- Host country: Australia
- Dates: 11 October – 1 December
- Teams: 7
- Venue: 9 (in 9 host cities)

Final positions
- Champions: (Victoria (state)) HC Melbourne (1st title)
- Runner-up: (Australian Capital Territory) Canberra Chill
- Third place: (Queensland) Brisbane Blaze

Tournament statistics
- Matches played: 25
- Goals scored: 145 (5.8 per match)
- Top scorer: 3 Players (see list below) (7 goals)

The 2024 Men's Liberty Hockey One was the fourth season of Hockey Australia's national league, Hockey One. The tournament was held across 7 states and territories of Australia. Competition commenced on 11 October, and culminated with a finals weekend in Hobart, from 30 November to 1 December.

== Competition format ==
=== Format ===
The 2024 Hockey One season followed the same format as the previous seasons of the league. Teams will play a series of home and away matches during the Pool Stage, which will be followed by a Classification Round.

During the pool stage, teams played each other once in either a home or a way fixture. The top four ranked teams qualified for the classification round, playing in two semi-finals with the winners contesting the final and losers the third place match.

=== Rules ===
In addition to FIH sanctioned rules, Hockey Australia is implementing the following rules for Hockey One:

- When a field goal or penalty stroke is scored the same athlete will have an automatic one-on-one shootout with the goalkeeper for an extra goal.
- Outright winner: There will be no drawn games. In the event of a draw, teams will contest a penalty shoot-out to determine a winner.

=== Point allocation ===
Match points will be distributed as follows:

- 5 points: win
- 3 points: shoot-out win
- 2 points: shoot-out loss
- 0 points: loss

== Participating teams ==
The seven teams competing in the league come from Australia's states and territories, with the Northern Territory being the only team absent.

(South Australia) Adelaide Fire

Head Coach: Jethro Eustice

1. Jed Snowden (GK)
2. Luke Anderson
3. Lucas Toonen
4. Jack Holland
5. Trent Symms
6. Angus Fry
7. Geoffrey Abbott
8. Sebastian Foster
9. Fred Gray (C)
10. Thomas Wycherley
11. Kyton Rayner
12. Lachlan Arneil
13. James Humphries
14. Isaac Whittaker
15. Fraser Bowden
16. Hugh Snowden
17. Bryce Hammond
19. Thomas Brown
20. Daniel Sibbald
21. Jethro Eustice
22. Richard Pautz
23. Lucas Noel
25. Landon Morley
27. Oliver Higgins (GK)
33. Mitchell Dell
(Queensland) Brisbane Blaze

Head Coach: Darren Fowler

1. William Mathison
2. Shane Kenny
3. Corey Weyer
4. Noah Fahy
5. Tyler Spry
6. Kyle Jeffery-Prestwich
7. Elliot Dale
8. Adam Imer
9. Jacob Anderson
11. Michael Francis
12. Jacob Whetton
13. David Hubbard
15. Jayden Atkinson
16. Timothy Howard
17. Scott Boyde
19. Luke Randle
20. Thomas Campbell
21. Max Harding
22. Matthew Finn (GK)
23. Daniel Beale (C)
24. Diarmid Chappell
25. Hayden Pease
26. Daykin Stanger
27. Joel Rintala
32. Mitchell Nicholson (GK)
(Australian Capital Territory) Canberra Chill

Head Coach: Seyi Onitiri

1. Aaron Knight
2. Benjamin Staines
3. Anand Gupte
4. Jaume Torras
5. Jesse Absolom
6. Xavier Gispert
7. Aidan Smith
8. Sean Baker
10. Owen Chivers
11. Garry Backhus
12. Jake Staines
13. Dylan Brick
14. Théophile Ponthieu
15. Hayden Dillon
16. Oscar Smart
17. Aiden Dooley
18. Kaito Tanaka
19. Hamish Morrison
20. Niranjan Gupte
22. Darcy MacDonald
23. Jay MacDonald
24. Davis Atkin
25. James Jewell
26. Max Robson (GK)
27. Andrew Charter (C, GK)
(Victoria (state)) HC Melbourne

Head Coach: Andrew Smith

1. Craig Marais
2. Peter Scott
3. Jonathan Bretherton
4. Liam Henderson
5. Doug Buckley
6. Damon Steffens (C)
7. Nathan Ephraums
8. Kade Leigh
9. Oliver Will
10. Bradley Marais
11. Cooper Burns
12. Connar Otterbach
13. Andrew Scanlon
14. Waheed Rana
15. Joshua Simmonds
16. Nicholas Fitzgerald
17. William Carruthers
18. Johan Durst (GK)
19. Jordan Rees
20. Nye Roberts
21. Connor Tuddenham
22. Benjamin White
26. Eden Davis
27. George McGeogh (GK)
28. Max Ferrier
(New South Wales) NSW Pride

Head Coach: Roel van Maastright

1. Lachlan Sharp
3. Nathan Ackroyd (GK)
4. Sebastien Griffith
5. Ashleigh Thomas (GK)
7. Daine Richards
8. Nathanael Stewart
9. Nathan Czinner
10. Liam Alexander
11. Dylan Downey
12. Jared Findlay
13. Blake Govers
14. Dylan Martin
15. Miles Davis
16. Joshua Gregory
17. Nicholas McEwen
18. Toby Mallon
19. Jack Hayes (C)
20. Ky Willott
21. Luke Noblett
23. Ryan Woolnough
29. Timothy Brand
32. Callum Mackay
34. Thomas Miotto
36. Michael Taylor
(Western Australia) Perth Thundersticks

Head Coach: Stephen Davies

1. Thomas Keating
2. William Battistessa
3. Brayden King
4. Jake Harvie (C)
5. Thomas Wickham
6. Kye Stirrat
7. Dave Gavranich
8. Coby Green
9. James Day
10. Joshua Bowen
11. Thomas Harvie
12. Marshall Puzey
13. Samuel Ashton
14. Chaz Davies
15. Matthew Bird
16. Brodee Foster
18. Benjamin Rennie (GK)
20. Angus Adamson
21. Christian Starkie (GK)
22. Max Freedman
23. Cambell Geddes
24. Matthew Willis
25. Fraser Heigh
26. James Collins
43. Harrison Golding (GK)
(Tasmania) Tassie Tigers

Head Coach: Benjamin Read

1. Magnus McCausland (GK)
2. Harvey Bessell
3. Keenan Johnson
4. Hayden Beltz
5. Max Johnstone
6. Joshua Brooks
7. Joshua Mardell
8. Ryan Jones
9. Jeremy Edwards
10. Samuel Payne
11. Edward Ockenden (C)
12. Jack Pritchard
13. Joshua Beltz
14. Jack Welch
15. Oscar Pritchard
16. Alexander Hogan-Jones
17. Oliver Pritchard
18. Grant Woodcock (GK)
19. Timothy Deavin
20. Ehren Hazell
21. Leon Hayward (GK)
22. Oliver Stebbings
26. Oliver Smith
28. Lachlan Rogers

== Venues ==
Melbourne	Perth	Adelaide
Melbourne Sports Centre	Perth Hockey Stadium	MATE Stadium
Capacity: 8,000	Capacity: 6,000	Capacity: 4,000
Brisbane	2024 Men's Hockey One is located in Australia	
Queensland State Hockey Centre	2024 Men's Hockey One is located in Australia	
Capacity: 1,000	2024 Men's Hockey One is located in Australia	
Canberra	2024 Men's Hockey One is located in Australia	
National Hockey Centre	2024 Men's Hockey One is located in Australia	
Goulburn	2024 Men's Hockey One is located in Australia	
Goulburn Hockey Complex	2024 Men's Hockey One is located in Australia	
Hobart	Narellan	Newcastle
Tasmanian Hockey Centre	Macarthur Regional Hockey Complex	Newcastle International Hockey Centre

== Results ==
=== Preliminary round ===
Pos	Team	Pld	W	WD	LD	L	GF	GA	GD	Pts	Qualification
1	(Australian Capital Territory) Canberra Chill	6	5	0	0	1	24	16	+8	25	Semi-finals
2	(Victoria (state)) HC Melbourne	6	4	0	1	1	24	18	+6	22	Semi-finals
3	(Western Australia) Perth Thundersticks	6	3	1	0	2	16	16	0	18	Semi-finals
4	(Queensland) Brisbane Blaze	6	2	1	1	2	13	11	+2	15	Semi-finals
5	(Tasmania) Tassie Tigers	6	2	1	1	2	18	20	−2	15	
6	(New South Wales) NSW Pride	6	1	0	0	5	12	18	−6	5	
7	(South Australia) Adelaide Fire	6	1	0	0	5	12	20	−8	5	

Source: Hockey Australia
Rules for classification: 1) points; 2) matches won; 3) goal difference; 4) goals for; 5) head-to-head result; 6) field goals scored.

==== Fixtures ====
11 October 2024
19:30 (ACDT)

Adelaide Fire (South Australia)	3–4	(Victoria (state)) HC Melbourne
Dell 26'; Morley 54', 57'	Report	Roberts 5'; Leigh 13', 55'; B. Marais 45'

MATE Stadium, Adelaide
Umpires:
Stephen Rogers (AUS)
Aaron Gotting (AUS)

12 October 2024
15:00 (AEDT)

Tassie Tigers (Tasmania)	4–3	(New South Wales) NSW Pride
Hazell 18'; Welch 46', 47', 47'	Report	Woolnough 7'; Taylor 24'; McEwen 51'

Tasmanian Hockey Centre, Hobart
Umpires:
Jayden Pearson (AUS)
Aaron Kitchener (AUS)

13 October 2024
14:00 (AEDT)

Canberra Chill (Australian Capital Territory)	4–3	(Western Australia) Perth Thundersticks
Dooley 3', 8', 9'; Jewell 12'	Report	T. Harvie 33'; Foster 35'; Wickham 49'

National Hockey Centre, Canberra
Umpires:
Stirling Sharpe (AUS)
James Unkles (AUS)

18 October 2024
20:00 (AEDT)

Canberra Chill (Australian Capital Territory)	6–2	(South Australia) Adelaide Fire
Brick 3', 39', 44'; Tanaka 11'; Backhus 33'; Dooley 59'	Report	Morley 23'; Sibbald 54'

National Hockey Centre, Canberra
Umpires:
Stirling Sharpe (AUS)
Oliver Chauhan (AUS)

19 October 2024
16:30 (AEDT)

NSW Pride (New South Wales)	3–2	(Queensland) Brisbane Blaze
Davis 18', 18', 38'	Report	Atkinson 23'; Chappell 59'

Newcastle International Hockey Centre, Newcastle
Umpires:
Zeke Newman (AUS)
Harrison Lye (AUS)

20 October 2024
19:00 (AWST)

Perth Thundersticks (Western Australia)	0–0	(Tasmania) Tassie Tigers
	Report
Penalties
Wickham (penalty shoot-out missed); J. Harvie (penalty shoot-out scored); Willis (penalty shoot-out scored); Green (penalty shoot-out missed); Foster (penalty shoot-out scored)	3–2	(penalty shoot-out scored) Welch; (penalty shoot-out scored) Hazell; (penalty shoot-out missed) H. Beltz; (penalty shoot-out missed) Edwards; (penalty shoot-out missed) Deavin

Perth Hockey Stadium, Perth
Umpires:
Daniel Johnston (AUS)
Jordan Moore (AUS)

25 October 2024
19:30 (AEST)

Brisbane Blaze (Queensland)	0–2	(Australian Capital Territory) Canberra Chill
	Report	J. Staines 57', 57'

Queensland State Hockey Centre, Brisbane
Umpires:
Stephen Rogers (AUS)
Aaron Gotting (AUS)

26 October 2024
18:30 (AEDT)

HC Melbourne (Victoria (state))	4–5	(Western Australia) Perth Thundersticks
Steffens 11'; Scott 11'; Burns 29'; Leigh 35'	Report	Foster 9', 56'; Wickham 48'; Day 57'; J. Harvie 57'

Melbourne Sports Centre, Melbourne
Umpires:
James Unkles (AUS)
Oliver Chauhan (AUS)

27 October 2024
15:30 (ACDT)

Adelaide Fire (South Australia)	3–4	(Tasmania) Tassie Tigers
Morley 15', 19', 19'	Report	Hazell 34'; Brooks 39'; Ockenden 41', 41'

MATE Stadium, Adelaide
Umpires:
Matthew Claxton (AUS)
Timothy Sheahan (AUS)

1 November 2024
20:00 (AEDT)

HC Melbourne (Victoria (state))	4–2	(New South Wales) NSW Pride
Burns 14'; Bretherton 23'; White 49', 49'	Report	Stewart 27'; Richards 48'

Melbourne Sports Centre, Melbourne
Umpires:
Oliver Chauhan (AUS)
Timothy Sheahan (AUS)

2 November 2024
16:30 (AEDT)

Tassie Tigers (Tasmania)	0–0	(Queensland) Brisbane Blaze
	Report
Penalties
Welch (penalty shoot-out scored); Hazell (penalty shoot-out scored); H. Beltz (penalty shoot-out scored); Edwards (penalty shoot-out missed)	3–1	(penalty shoot-out missed) Atkinson; (penalty shoot-out missed) Anderson; (penalty shoot-out scored) Boyde; (penalty shoot-out missed) Stanger

Tasmanian Hockey Centre, Hobart
Umpires:
Jayden Pearson (AUS)
James Unkles (AUS)

3 November 2024
17:30 (AWST)

Perth Thundersticks (Western Australia)	3–2	(South Australia) Adelaide Fire
Wickham 41', 41'; Foster 52'	Report	H. Snowden 29', 29'

Perth Hockey Stadium, Perth
Umpires:
Matthew Claxton (AUS)
Jordan Moore (AUS)

8 November 2024
19:00 (AEDT)

NSW Pride (New South Wales)	1–3	(Western Australia) Perth Thundersticks
Willott 58'	Report	Battistessa 22', 22'; Day 24'

Macarthur Regional Hockey Complex, Narellan
Umpires:
Zeke Newman (AUS)
Harrison Lye (AUS)

9 November 2024
15:00 (AEDT)

Tassie Tigers (Tasmania)	7–8	(Australian Capital Territory) Canberra Chill
Brooks 9'; H. Beltz 10', 28', 54', 57'; Rogers 19'; Hazell 57'	Report	Brick 15', 40'; B. Staines 38', 52', 52', 54'; Dooley 60', 60'

Tasmanian Hockey Centre, Hobart
Umpires:
Timothy Sheahan (AUS)
Aaron Kitchener (AUS)

10 November 2024
16:30 (AEST)

Brisbane Blaze (Queensland)	4–4	(Victoria (state)) HC Melbourne
Weyer 29'; Atkinson 51'; Stanger 55', 55'	Report	White 18'; Steffens 33', 49'; Burns 52'
Penalties
Atkinson (penalty shoot-out scored); Stanger (penalty shoot-out missed); Weyer (penalty shoot-out scored); Anderson (penalty shoot-out missed)	2–1	(penalty shoot-out missed) Tuddenham; (penalty shoot-out missed) White; (penalty shoot-out missed) Scott; (penalty shoot-out scored) Henderson; (penalty shoot-out missed) C. Marais

Queensland State Hockey Centre, Brisbane
Umpires:
Aaron Gotting (AUS)
Aleisha Neumann (AUS)

15 November 2024
18:30 (AEDT)

Canberra Chill (Australian Capital Territory)	1–2	(Victoria (state)) HC Melbourne
Tanaka 59'	Report	C. Marais 4'; Otterbach 28'

National Hockey Centre, Canberra
Umpires:
Stirling Sharpe (AUS)
Kristy Robertson (AUS)

16 November 2024
19:30 (ACDT)

Adelaide Fire (South Australia)	2–1	(New South Wales) NSW Pride
Brown 45+'; Morley 59'	Report	Taylor 44'

MATE Stadium, Adelaide
Umpires:
Jayden Pearson (AUS)
James Unkles (AUS)

17 November 2024
19:00 (AWST)

Perth Thundersticks (Western Australia)	2–5	(Queensland) Brisbane Blaze
Day 17'; J. Harvie 47'	Report	Anderson 13', 26', 50'; Weyer 59'; Atkinson 59'

Perth Hockey Stadium, Perth
Umpires:
Daniel Johnston (AUS)
Jordan Moore (AUS)

22 November 2024
20:00 (AEDT)

HC Melbourne (Victoria (state))	6–3	(Tasmania) Tassie Tigers
White 10', 48'; C. Marais 17'; Burns 20'; Tuddenham 38'; Scott 45'	Report	Welch 15'; Ockenden 21'; Hazell 21'

Melbourne Sports Centre, Melbourne
Umpires:
Zeke Newman (AUS)
Timothy Sheahan (AUS)

23 November 2024
18:30 (AEST)

Brisbane Blaze (Queensland)	2–0	(South Australia) Adelaide Fire
Dale 10', 11'	Report

Queensland State Hockey Centre, Brisbane
Umpires:
Stephen Rogers (AUS)
Aaron Gotting (AUS)

24 November 2024
14:30 (AEDT)

NSW Pride (New South Wales)	2–3	(Australian Capital Territory) Canberra Chill
Davis 15'; Downey 22'	Report	Dillon 16', 16'; Dooley 39'

Goulburn Hockey Complex, Goulburn
Umpires:
James Unkles (AUS)
Kristy Robertson (AUS)

=== Classification round ===
Semi-finals
30 November
(Australian Capital Territory) Canberra Chill	3
(Queensland) Brisbane Blaze	2
30 November
(Victoria (state)) HC Melbourne	4
(Western Australia) Perth Thundersticks	3

Final
1 December
(Australian Capital Territory) Canberra Chill	2
(Victoria (state)) HC Melbourne	5
Third place
1 December
(Queensland) Brisbane Blaze	4
(Western Australia) Perth Thundersticks	3

==== Semi-finals ====
30 November 2024
11:00 (AEDT)

Canberra Chill (Australian Capital Territory)	3–2	(Queensland) Brisbane Blaze
Atkin 14'; Brick 40', 60'	Report	Beale 45', 45'

Tasmanian Hockey Centre, Hobart
Umpires:
James Unkles (AUS)
Zeke Newman (AUS)

30 November 2024
14:30 (AEDT)

HC Melbourne (Victoria (state))	4–3	(Western Australia) Perth Thundersticks
Steffens 8'; B. Marais 14'; Burns 41'; Otterbach 50'	Report	Day 5', 53'; T. Harvie 46'

Tasmanian Hockey Centre, Hobart
Umpires:
Jayden Pearson (AUS)
Stephen Rogers (AUS)

==== Third and fourth place ====
1 December 2024
11:30 (AEDT)

Brisbane Blaze (Queensland)	4–3	(Western Australia) Perth Thundersticks
Boyde 15'; Weyer 17', 17'; Howard 27'	Report	Green 7'; Foster 34', 34'

Tasmanian Hockey Centre, Hobart
Umpires:
James Unkles (AUS)
Jayden Pearson (AUS)

==== Final ====
1 December 2024
15:30 (AEDT)

Canberra Chill (Australian Capital Territory)	2–5	(Victoria (state)) HC Melbourne
B. Staines 38'; Absolom 38'	Report	Ephraums 16', 33', 33'; Otterbach 54'; Simmonds 54'

Tasmanian Hockey Centre, Hobart
Umpires:
Zeke Newman (AUS)
Stephen Rogers (AUS)

== Final standings ==
Pos	Team	Pld	W	WD	LD	L	GF	GA	GD	Pts	Final standing
1st place, gold medalist(s)	(Victoria (state)) HC Melbourne	8	6	0	1	1	33	23	+10	32	Gold Medal
2nd place, silver medalist(s)	(Australian Capital Territory) Canberra Chill	8	6	0	0	2	29	23	+6	30	Silver Medal
3rd place, bronze medalist(s)	(Queensland) Brisbane Blaze	8	3	1	1	3	19	17	+2	20	Bronze Medal
4	(Western Australia) Perth Thundersticks	8	3	1	0	4	22	24	−2	18	Fourth Place
5	(Tasmania) Tassie Tigers	6	2	1	1	2	18	20	−2	15	Eliminated in Group Stage
6	(New South Wales) NSW Pride	6	1	0	0	5	12	18	−6	5	Eliminated in Group Stage
7	(South Australia) Adelaide Fire	6	1	0	0	5	12	20	−8	5	Eliminated in Group Stage

Source: Hockey Australia

== Awards ==
Top Goalscorer	Player of the League	Player of the Final	Fans Player of the League
(South Australia) Landon Morley (Australian Capital Territory) Aiden Dooley	(Tasmania) Edward Ockenden	(Victoria (state)) Nathan Ephraums	(Victoria (state)) Cooper Burns

== Team of the Year ==
At the conclusion of the regular season, a team of the year was named:

2024 Men's Team of the Year
Goalkeeper	Defenders	Midfielders	Forwards	Substitutes
Johan Durst (Mebourne)	Anand Gupte (Chill); James Day (Thundersticks); Jay MacDonald (Chill)	Jake Harvie (Thundersticks); Hayden Beltz (Tigers); Nathan Czinner (Pride); Jayden Atkinson (Blaze)	Cooper Burns (Melbourne); Benjamin White (Melbourne); Benjamin Staines (Chill)	Edward Ockenden (Tigers); Hayden Dillon (Chill); Peter Scott (Melbourne); Thomas Wickham (Thundersticks)

== Goalscorers ==
There were 145 goals scored in 25 matches, for an average of 5.8 goals per match.

7 goals

- (South Australia) Landon Morley
- (Australian Capital Territory) Dylan Brick
- (Australian Capital Territory) Aiden Dooley

6 goals

- (Western Australia) Brodee Foster

5 goals

- (Australian Capital Territory) Benjamin Staines
- (Victoria (state)) Cooper Burns
- (Victoria (state)) Benjamin White
- (Western Australia) James Day

4 goals

- (Queensland) Corey Weyer
- (Victoria (state)) Damon Steffens
- (New South Wales) Miles Davis
- (Western Australia) Thomas Wickham
- (Tasmania) Hayden Beltz
- (Tasmania) Ehren Hazell
- (Tasmania) Jack Welch

3 goals

- (Queensland) Jacob Anderson
- (Queensland) Jayden Atkinson
- (Victoria (state)) Nathan Ephraums
- (Victoria (state)) Kade Leigh
- (Victoria (state)) Connar Otterbach
- (Tasmania) Edward Ockenden

2 goals

- (South Australia) Hugh Snowden
- (Queensland) Daniel Beale
- (Queensland) Elliot Dale
- (Queensland) Daykin Stanger
- (Australian Capital Territory) Hayden Dillon
- (Australian Capital Territory) Jake Staines
- (Australian Capital Territory) Kaito Tanaka
- (Victoria (state)) Bradley Marais
- (Victoria (state)) Craig Marais
- (Victoria (state)) Peter Scott
- (New South Wales) Michael Taylor
- (Western Australia) William Battistessa
- (Western Australia) Jake Harvie
- (Western Australia) Thomas Harvie
- (Tasmania) Joshua Brooks

1 goal

- (South Australia) Thomas Brown
- (South Australia) Mitchell Dell
- (South Australia) Daniel Sibbald
- (Queensland) Scott Boyde
- (Queensland) Diarmid Chappell
- (Queensland) Timothy Howard
- (Australian Capital Territory) Jesse Absolom
- (Australian Capital Territory) Davis Atkin
- (Australian Capital Territory) Garry Backhus
- (Australian Capital Territory) James Jewell
- (Victoria (state)) Jonathan Bretherton
- (Victoria (state)) Nye Roberts
- (Victoria (state)) Joshua Simmonds
- (Victoria (state)) Connor Tuddenham
- (New South Wales) Dylan Downey
- (New South Wales) Nicholas McEwen
- (New South Wales) Daine Richards
- (New South Wales) Nathanael Stewart
- (New South Wales) Ky Willott
- (New South Wales) Ryan Woolnough
- (Western Australia) Coby Green
- (Tasmania) Lachlan Rogers

Source: Hockey Australia
