= 2022 Men's Hockey One =

Hockey Australia's national league, second season

2022 Men's Sultana Bran Hockey One
Tournament details
- Host country: Australia
- Dates: 29 September – 20 November
- Teams: 7
- Venue: 9 (in 9 host cities)

Final positions
- Champions: (New South Wales) NSW Pride (2nd title)
- Runner-up: (Western Australia) Perth Thundersticks
- Third place: (Queensland) Brisbane Blaze

Tournament statistics
- Matches played: 25
- Goals scored: 143 (5.72 per match)
- Top scorer: (Queensland) Joel Rintala (11 goals)
- Best player: (Australian Capital Territory) Andrew Charter

The 2022 Men's Sultana Bran Hockey One was the second season of Hockey Australia's national league, Hockey One. The tournament was held across 7 states and territories of Australia. Competition commenced on 29 September, and culminated with a finals weekend running from 19 to 20 November.

Unlike the previous edition where the top ranked women's team hosted the grand final, the grand final of the tournament will be held at a neutral venue in Bendigo.

== Competition format ==
=== Format ===
The 2022 Hockey One season will follow same format as season one. Teams will play a series of home and away matches during the Pool Stage, which will be followed by a Classification Round.

During the pool stage, teams play each other once in either a home or a way fixture. The top four ranked teams will then qualify for the Classification Round, playing in two semi-finals with the winners contesting a grand final. Team 1 will host Team 4, while Team 2 will host Team 3. Of the two victorious teams, the higher ranked team from the pool stage will host the grand final.

=== Rules ===
In addition to FIH sanctioned rules, Hockey Australia is implementing the following rules for Hockey One:

- When a field goal or penalty stroke is scored the same athlete will have an automatic one-on-one shootout with the goalkeeper for an extra goal.
- Outright winner: There will be no drawn games. In the event of a draw, teams will contest a penalty shoot-out to determine a winner.

=== Point allocation ===
Match points will be distributed as follows:

- 5 points: win
- 3 points: shoot-out win
- 2 points: shoot-out loss
- 0 points: loss

== Participating teams ==
The seven teams competing in the league come from Australia's states and territories, with the Northern Territory being the only team absent.

(South Australia) Adelaide Fire

Head Coach: Hugh Purvis

1. Thomas Cleghorn
2. Connor Richmond-Spouse
3. Isaac Whittaker
4. Jye Clark (GK)
5. Jack Holland
6. Angus Fry
7. Geoffrey Abbott
8. Brodie Gleeson
9. Fred Gray
11. Cameron Joyce (C)
12. Mitchell Dell
14. Nathan Hochman
15. William Abbott
17. Zachary Rakkas
18. Alastair Oliver
19. Glyn Tamlin
20. Matthew Magann
21. Michael Doan
22. Christian Starkie (GK)
23. Cameron White
(Queensland) Brisbane Blaze

Head Coach: Darren Fowler

2. Shane Kenny
3. Corey Weyer
4. Hugh Pembroke
5. Luca Brown
6. Joshua Mynott
7. Joel Rintala
8. Adam Imer
9. Jacob Anderson
10. Jayden Atkinson
11. Michael Francis
12. Jacob Whetton (C)
13. Ethan White
14. Isaac Layton
15. Cale Cramer
16. Timothy Howard
17. Scott Boyde
18. Aaron Weiss (GK)
23. Daniel Beale
27. Jared Taylor
32. Mitchell Nicholson (GK)
(Australian Capital Territory) Canberra Chill

Head Coach: Seyi Onitiri

2. Benjamin Staines
3. Anand Gupte
4. James Day
6. Connor Tuddenham
7. Benjamin Craig (C)
8. Sean Baker
9. Jamie Hawke
10. Owen Chivers
11. Garry Backhus
12. Jake Staines
13. Dylan Brick
14. Glenn Turner
15. Hayden Dillon
16. Oscar Smart
17. Aiden Dooley
19. Jeremy Hopkins
22. Jay MacDonald
24. Davis Atkin
30. Andrew Charter (GK)
32. Brendan Hill (GK)
(Victoria (state)) HC Melbourne

Head Coach: Lachlan Anderson

1. Craig Marais
2. Max Hendry
3. Jonathan Bretherton
4. Liam Henderson
5. Douglas Buckley
6. Damon Steffens
7. Nathan Ephraums
8. Lachlan Steinfort
9. Trent Symss
10. Russell Ford (C)
11. Cooper Burns
12. Connar Otterbach
13. Jayshaan Randhawa
14. Eden Davis
15. Joshua Simmonds
16. Jed Snowden (GK)
17. Kiran Arunasalam
18. Johan Durst (GK)
20. Joshua Bretherton
21. Jake Sherren
(New South Wales) NSW Pride

Head Coach: Brent Livermore

1. Matthew Dawson (C)
2. Thomas Craig
5. Ashleigh Thomas (GK)
7. Daine Richards
8. Nathanael Stewart
9. Nathan Czinner
11. Robert MacLennan (GK)
13. Blake Govers
14. Dylan Martin
15. Miles Davis
19. Thomas Brown
20. Ky Willott
22. Flynn Ogilvie
23. Ryan Proctor
25. Jack Hayes
26. Ehren Hazell
28. Samuel Gray
32. Callum Mackay
34. Thomas Miotto
35. Rory Walker
71. Lachlan Sharp
75. Timothy Brand
(Western Australia) Perth Thundersticks

Head Coach: David Guest

1. Christopher Bausor
2. William Battistessa
3. Timothy Geers
4. Jake Harvie
5. Bryn de Bes
6. James Collins
7. Tyler Lovell (GK)
8. Brodee Foster
10. Thomas Wickham
11. Thomas Harvie
12. Alistair Murray
13. Cambell Geddes
14. Liam Flynn
17. Aran Zalewski (C)
18. Harrison Golding
19. Benjamin Rennie (GK)
20. Sasha Thomas
21. Ross Hall
22. Benjamin Taylor
24. Matthew Willis
(Tasmania) Tassie Tigers

Head Coach: Stephen McMullen

2. Tyler McDonald
4. Hayden Beltz
5. Benjamin Austin
6. Joshua Brooks
7. Joshua Mardell
8. Joseph Murphy
9. Jeremy Edwards
11. Edward Ockenden
12. Samuel McCulloch
13. Joshua Beltz (C)
14. Jack Welch
15. Kieron Arthur
19. Timothy Deavin
20. James Bourke
22. Oliver Pritchard
23. Henry Chambers (GK)
25. Max Larkin (GK)
26. Oliver Smith
27. Gobindraj Gill
32. Jeremy Hayward

== Venues ==
Sydney	Melbourne	Perth
Sydney Olympic Park	State Netball and Hockey Centre	Perth Hockey Stadium
Capacity: 8,000	Capacity: 8,000	Capacity: 6,000
Adelaide	2022 Men's Hockey One is located in Australia	
State Hockey Centre	2022 Men's Hockey One is located in Australia	
Capacity: 4,000	2022 Men's Hockey One is located in Australia	
Brisbane	2022 Men's Hockey One is located in Australia	
Queensland State Hockey Centre	2022 Men's Hockey One is located in Australia	
Capacity: 1,000	2022 Men's Hockey One is located in Australia	
Bendigo	2022 Men's Hockey One is located in Australia	
Bendigo Regional Hockey Complex	2022 Men's Hockey One is located in Australia	
Canberra	Hobart	Parkes
National Hockey Centre	Tasmanian Hockey Centre	McGlynn Sporting Complex

== Results ==
=== Preliminary round ===
Pos	Team	Pld	W	WD	LD	L	GF	GA	GD	Pts	Qualification
1	(Queensland) Brisbane Blaze	6	5	0	0	1	20	7	+13	25	Semi-finals
2	(Australian Capital Territory) Canberra Chill	6	4	1	0	1	21	9	+12	23	Semi-finals
3	(Western Australia) Perth Thundersticks	6	3	0	1	2	21	17	+4	17	Semi-finals
4	(New South Wales) NSW Pride	6	3	0	0	3	16	19	−3	15	Semi-finals
5	(Tasmania) Tassie Tigers	6	2	1	1	2	14	15	−1	15	
6	(Victoria (state)) HC Melbourne	6	2	0	0	4	23	25	−2	10	
7	(South Australia) Adelaide Fire	6	0	0	0	6	7	30	−23	0	

Source: Hockey Australia
Rules for classification: 1) points; 2) matches won; 3) goal difference; 4) goals for; 5) head-to-head result; 6) field goals scored.

==== Fixtures ====
29 September 2022
20:00 (AEST)

HC Melbourne (Victoria (state))	3–6	(New South Wales) NSW Pride
Steffens 5'; Ephraums 55', 55'	Report	Richards 36', 36'; Willott 42', 42'; Davis 54'; Martin 60'

Melbourne Sports Centre, Melbourne
Umpires:
Timothy Sheahan (AUS)
Benjamin Hocking (AUS)

30 September 2022
20:00 (AEST)

Tassie Tigers (Tasmania)	1–4	(Queensland) Brisbane Blaze
Ockenden 35'	Report	Rintala 3', 30'; Cramer 14', 14'

Tasmanian Hockey Centre, Hobart
Umpires:
Jayden Person (AUS)
Stirling Sharpe (AUS)

1 October 2022
19:00 (AWST)

Perth Thundersticks (Western Australia)	5–2	(South Australia) Adelaide Fire
Zalewski 45', 58', 58'; Geddes 51'; Wickham 53'	Report	Fry 46', 46'

Perth Hockey Stadium, Perth
Umpires:
Daniel Johnston (AUS)
Nathan Jennings (AUS)

6 October 2022
19:00 (AEST)

Brisbane Blaze (Queensland)	3–1	(Australian Capital Territory) Canberra Chill
Rintala 30'; Cramer 32', 32'	Report	B. Staines 18'

Queensland State Hockey Centre, Brisbane
Umpires:
Aaron Gotting (AUS)
Stephen Rogers (AUS)

7 October 2022
20:00 (AEDT)

HC Melbourne (Victoria (state))	5–8	(Western Australia) Perth Thundersticks
Ephraums 24', 24', 53', 53'; Burns 43'	Report	Wickham 19', 19', 28', 28'; Geddes 26', 40'; Flynn 45', 56'

Melbourne Sports Centre, Melbourne
Umpires:
James Unkles (AUS)
Benjamin Hocking (AUS)

8 October 2022
20:30 (ACDT)

Adelaide Fire (South Australia)	0–5	(Tasmania) Tassie Tigers
	Report	Brooks 17', 35'; McCulloch 24'; Arthur 38'; Ockenden 45'

MATE Stadium, Adelaide
Umpires:
Jayden Pearson (AUS)
Zeke Newman (AUS)

13 October 2022
18:30 (AEDT)

Canberra Chill (Australian Capital Territory)	4–0	(Victoria (state)) HC Melbourne
Day 4'; Dooley 25', 26'; B. Staines 34'	Report

National Hockey Centre, Canberra
Umpires:
Stirling Sharpe (AUS)
Zeke Newman (AUS)

14 October 2022
19:30 (ACDT)

Adelaide Fire (South Australia)	3–4	(New South Wales) NSW Pride
Tamlin 42'; Holland 42', 46'	Report	Hazell 28', 36'; Willott 32', 32'

MATE Stadium, Adelaide
Umpires:
James Unkles (AUS)
Timothy Sheahan (AUS)

15 October 2022
16:30 (AWST)

Perth Thundersticks (Western Australia)	3–2	(Queensland) Brisbane Blaze
Flynn 7', 35'; Battistessa 54'	Report	Cramer 32'; Rintala 45'

Perth Hockey Stadium, Perth

20 October 2022
18:30 (AEDT)

Tassie Tigers (Tasmania)	4–4	(Australian Capital Territory) Canberra Chill
Welch 4', 30', 35'; Edwards 30'	Report	Day 26', 60+'; Atkin 59', 59'
Penalties
J. Beltz (penalty shoot-out scored); Ockenden (penalty shoot-out missed); Welch (penalty shoot-out missed); H. Beltz (penalty shoot-out scored); Edwards (penalty shoot-out missed)	2–3	(penalty shoot-out scored) Backhus; (penalty shoot-out missed) J. Staines; (penalty shoot-out scored) Atkin; (penalty shoot-out scored) Day; (penalty shoot-out missed) Dooley

Tasmanian Hockey Centre, Hobart
Umpires:
Timothy Sheahan (AUS)
Aaron Gotting (AUS)

21 October 2022
18:30 (AEDT)

NSW Pride (New South Wales)	4–3	(Western Australia) Perth Thundersticks
Hazell 6', 7'; Richards 28', 28'	Report	Bausor 9'; J. Harvie 9'; Zalewski 48'

Sydney Olympic Park, Sydney
Umpires:
Zeke Newman (AUS)
Benjamin Hocking (AUS)

22 October 2022
18:30 (AEST)

Brisbane Blaze (Queensland)	4–0	(Victoria (state)) HC Melbourne
Rintala 26'; Boyde 41'; Whetton 42', 42'	Report

Queensland State Hockey Centre, Brisbane
Umpires:
Benjamin de Young (AUS)
Stephen Rogers (AUS)

27 October 2022
20:00 (AEDT)

Canberra Chill (Australian Capital Territory)	5–0	(South Australia) Adelaide Fire
B. Staines 20', 20', 40', 45'; Day 30'	Report

National Hockey Centre, Canberra
Umpires:
Stirling Sharpe (AUS)
James Unkles (AUS)

28 October 2022
20:00 (AEDT)

NSW Pride (New South Wales)	1–5	(Queensland) Brisbane Blaze
Davis 53'	Report	Cramer 19', 19', 30+'; Rintala 59', 60'

Sydney Olympic Park, Sydney
Umpires:
Zeke Newman (AUS)
Aaron Gotting (AUS)

29 October 2022
20:00 (AWST)

Perth Thundersticks (Western Australia)	0–0	(Tasmania) Tassie Tigers
	Report
Penalties
Wickham (penalty shoot-out scored); J. Harvie (penalty shoot-out scored); Collins (penalty shoot-out scored); Zalewski (penalty shoot-out missed); Bausor (penalty shoot-out scored); Wickham (penalty shoot-out scored); J. Harvie (penalty shoot-out missed); Collins (penalty shoot-out missed); Zalewski (penalty shoot-out scored); Bausor (penalty shoot-out missed)	6–7	(penalty shoot-out scored) Welch; (penalty shoot-out missed) Edwards; (penalty shoot-out scored) Ockenden; (penalty shoot-out scored) J. Beltz; (penalty shoot-out scored) H. Beltz; (penalty shoot-out scored) Welch; (penalty shoot-out missed) J. Beltz; (penalty shoot-out missed) Ockenden; (penalty shoot-out scored) H. Beltz; (penalty shoot-out scored) Edwards

Perth Hockey Stadium, Perth
Umpires:
Daniel Johnstan (AUS)
Nathan Jennings (AUS)

3 November 2022
19:30 (ACDT)

Adelaide Fire (South Australia)	1–9	(Victoria (state)) HC Melbourne
Whittaker 37'	Report	Simmonds 5', 26', 53'; Copey 9', 9'; Steffens 10'; Ephraums 47', 47'; Jos. Bretherton 54'

MATE Stadium, Adelaide
Umpires:
Benjamin de Young (AUS)
Zeke Newman (AUS)

4 November 2022
20:00 (AEDT)

Tassie Tigers (Tasmania)	2–1	(New South Wales) NSW Pride
Hayward 11'; Welch 28'	Report	Willott 38'

Tasmanian Hockey Centre, Hobart
Umpires:
Jayden Pearson (AUS)
Timothy Sheahan (AUS)

5 November 2022
17:00 (AEDT)

Canberra Chill (Australian Capital Territory)	4–2	(Western Australia) Perth Thundersticks
Day 7'; Dooley 15'; Hawke 24'; Backhus 36'	Report	Willis 3'; Wickham 34'

National Hockey Centre, Canberra
Umpires:
Stirling Sharpe (AUS)
Stephen Rogers (AUS)

10 November 2022
20:00 (AEDT)

HC Melbourne (Victoria (state))	6–2	(Tasmania) Tassie Tigers
Steffens 13', 45'; Ephraums 30', 30'; Simmonds 32'; C. Marais 43'	Report	Hayward 21', 41'

Melbourne Sports Centre, Melbourne
Umpires:
James Unkles (AUS)
Benjamin Hocking (AUS)

11 November 2022
19:00 (AEST)

Brisbane Blaze (Queensland)	2–1	(South Australia) Adelaide Fire
Rintala 2'; Weyer 43'	Report	Holland 5'

Queensland State Hockey Centre, Brisbane
Umpires:
Benjamin de Young (AUS)
Aaron Gotting (AUS)

12 November 2022
15:30 (AEDT)

NSW Pride (New South Wales)	0–3	(Australian Capital Territory) Canberra Chill
	Report	Day 5'; Dooley 44'; Hawke 56'

McGlynn Sporting Complex, Parkes
Umpires:
Neke Newman (AUS)
Stirling Sharpe (AUS)

=== Classification round ===
Semi-finals
19 November 2022
(Queensland) Brisbane Blaze	1 (3)
(New South Wales) NSW Pride (pen.)	1 (5)
19 November 2022
(Australian Capital Territory) Canberra Chill	3
(Western Australia) Perth Thundersticks	6

Grand Final
20 November 2022
(New South Wales) NSW Pride	2
(Western Australia) Perth Thundersticks	0
Third Place
20 November 2022
(Queensland) Brisbane Blaze	6
(Australian Capital Territory) Canberra Chill	2

==== Semi-finals ====
19 November 2022
12:05

Brisbane Blaze (Queensland)	1–1	(New South Wales) NSW Pride
Howard 30'	Report	Dawson 37'
Penalties
Anderson (penalty shoot-out missed); Cramer (penalty shoot-out scored); Weyer (penalty shoot-out scored); Beale (penalty shoot-out scored)	3–5	(penalty shoot-out scored) Craig; (penalty shoot-out scored) Hayes; (penalty shoot-out scored) Willott; (penalty shoot-out scored) Ogilvie; (penalty shoot-out scored) Richards

Bendigo Regional Hockey Complex, Bendigo
Umpires:
Daniel Johnston (AUS)
Timothy Sheahan (AUS)

19 November 2022
15:05

Canberra Chill (Australian Capital Territory)	3–6	(Western Australia) Perth Thundersticks
Craig 54', 54'; Dooley 57'	Report	Battistessa 4'; Foster 11'; Geddes 20'; Wickham 24', 37', 37'

Bendigo Regional Hockey Complex, Bendigo
Umpires:
Zeke Newman (AUS)
James Unkles (AUS)

==== Third and fourth place ====
20 November 2022
12:05

Brisbane Blaze (Queensland)	6–2	(Australian Capital Territory) Canberra Chill
Rintala 17', 59', 59'; Francis 24'; Boyde 30'; Cramer 49'	Report	Day 4', 60'

Bendigo Regional Hockey Complex, Bendigo
Umpires:
James Unkles (AUS)
Benjamin Hocking (AUS)

==== Final ====
20 November 2022
16:15

NSW Pride (New South Wales)	2–0	(Western Australia) Perth Thundersticks
Willott 24', 24'	Report

Bendigo Regional Hockey Complex, Bendigo
Umpires:
Zeke Newman (AUS)
Daniel Johnston (AUS)

== Awards ==
Top Goalscorer(s)	Player of the League	Player of the Final
(Queensland) Joel Rintala	(Australian Capital Territory) Andrew Charter	(New South Wales) Ky Willott

== Final standings ==
Pos	Team	Pld	W	WD	LD	L	GF	GA	GD	Pts	Final standing
1st place, gold medalist(s)	(New South Wales) NSW Pride	8	4	1	0	3	19	20	−1	23	Gold Medal
2nd place, silver medalist(s)	(Western Australia) Perth Thundersticks	8	4	0	1	3	27	22	+5	22	Silver Medal
3rd place, bronze medalist(s)	(Queensland) Brisbane Blaze	8	6	0	1	1	27	10	+17	32	Bronze Medal
4	(Australian Capital Territory) Canberra Chill	8	4	1	0	3	26	21	+5	23	Fourth Place
5	(Tasmania) Tassie Tigers	6	2	1	1	2	14	15	−1	15	Eliminated in Group Stage
6	(Victoria (state)) HC Melbourne	6	2	0	0	4	23	25	−2	10	Eliminated in Group Stage
7	(South Australia) Adelaide Fire	6	0	0	0	6	7	30	−23	0	Eliminated in Group Stage

Source: Hockey Australia

== Goalscorers ==
There were 143 goals scored in 25 matches, for an average of 5.72 goals per match.

11 goals

- (Queensland) Joel Rintala

10 goals

- (Victoria (state)) Nathan Ephraums

9 goals

- (Queensland) Cale Cramer
- (Western Australia) Thomas Wickham

8 goals

- (Australian Capital Territory) James Day

7 goals

- (New South Wales) Ky Willott

6 goals

- (Australian Capital Territory) Benjamin Staines

5 goals

- (Australian Capital Territory) Aiden Dooley

4 goals

- (New South Wales) Ehren Hazell
- (New South Wales) Daine Richards
- (Tasmania) Jack Welch
- (Victoria (state)) Joshua Simmonds
- (Victoria (state)) Damon Steffens
- (Western Australia) Liam Flynn
- (Western Australia) Cambell Geddes
- (Western Australia) Aran Zalewski

3 goals

- (South Australia) Jack Holland
- (Tasmania) Jeremy Hayward

2 goals

- (Australian Capital Territory) Davis Atkin
- (Australian Capital Territory) Benjamin Craig
- (Australian Capital Territory) Jamie Hawke
- (New South Wales) Miles Davis
- (Queensland) Scott Boyde
- (Queensland) Jacob Whetton
- (South Australia) Angus Fry
- (Tasmania) Joshua Brooks
- (Tasmania) Edward Ockenden
- (Victoria (state)) Nathan Copey
- (Western Australia) William Battistessa

1 goal

- (Australian Capital Territory) Garry Backhus
- (New South Wales) Matthew Dawson
- (New South Wales) Dylan Martin
- (Queensland) Michael Francis
- (Queensland) Timothy Howard
- (Queensland) Corey Weyer
- (South Australia) Glyn Tamlin
- (South Australia) Isaac Whittaker
- (Tasmania) Kieron Arthur
- (Tasmania) Jeremy Edwards
- (Tasmania) Samuel McCulloch
- (Victoria (state)) Cooper Burns
- (Victoria (state)) Joshua Bretherton
- (Victoria (state)) Craig Marais
- (Western Australia) Christopher Bausor
- (Western Australia) Brodee Foster
- (Western Australia) Jake Harvie
- (Western Australia) Matthew Willis

Source: Hockey Australia
