= Craig Marais =

Craig Marais may refer to:

- Craig Marais (cricketer)
- Craig Marais (field hockey)
