= 2022 Men's Junior Oceania Cup =

Field hockey tournament

Tournament details
- Host country: Australia
- City: Canberra
- Dates: 8–11 December
- Teams: 2 (from 1 confederation)
- Venue: National Hockey Centre

Final positions
- Champions: Australia (5th title)
- Runner-up: New Zealand

Tournament statistics
- Matches played: 3
- Goals scored: 20 (6.67 per match)
- Top scorer: (Australia) Cambell Geddes (5 goals)

The 2022 Men's Junior Oceania Cup was the fifth edition of the Junior Oceania Cup for men. The tournament consisted of three test matches between the national under–21 teams of Australia and New Zealand. It was held at the National Hockey Centre in Canberra, Australia from 8–11 December.

The tournament served as a qualifier for the 2023 FIH Junior World Cup to be held in Kuala Lumpur, Malaysia. As only two national associations will participate, both teams will automatically qualify as the OHF receives two qualification places.

== Squads ==
The squads were named on 7 November and 25 October, respectively.

Australia

Head Coach: Jay Stacy

3. David Hubbard
6. Liam Henderson
7. Craig Marais
8. Toby Mallon
10. Jay MacDonald
11. Max Freedman
12. Trent Symss
13. Davis Atkin
14. Miles Davis
16. Nathan Czinner
17. Hamish Adamson
19. Connar Otterbach (C)
21. Cooper Burns
22. Joshua Brooks
23. Cambell Geddes
24. Brodee Foster
26. Jed Snowden (GK)
28. Ryan Oschadleus (GK)
New Zealand

Head Coach: Samuel Bartholomew

1. Ryan Parr
2. George Baker
3. Isaac Houlbrooke
4. Nicholas Lidstone (C)
5. Thomas Marchant
6. Aidan Fraser
7. Luke Holmes
8. Scott Cosslett
9. Patrick Ward
10. Charles Morrison
11. Daniel Torr
12. Benjamin Culhane
13. Samuel Lints (GK)
14. Luke Aldred
15. James Nicolson
16. Patrick Madder
17. Luke Elmes (GK)
18. Hayden Ganley (GK)

== Results ==
All times are local (AEDT).

=== Standings ===
Pos	Team	Pld	W	D	L	GF	GA	GD	Pts	Qualification
1	Australia (H, C)	3	2	1	0	13	7	+6	7	2023 FIH Junior World Cup
2	New Zealand	3	0	1	2	7	13	−6	1	2023 FIH Junior World Cup

Source: FIH
Rules for classification: 1) points; 2) goal difference; 3) goals scored; 4) head-to-head result.
(C) Champions; (H) Hosts

=== Fixtures ===
8 December 2022
18:30

Australia	4–2	New Zealand
Marais 19', 44'; Burns 48'; Geddes 55'	Report	Aldred 10'; Fraser 45'

Umpires:
Nicholas Saunders (NZL)
James Unkles (AUS)

10 December 2022
13:00

Australia	4–4	New Zealand
Brooks 7'; Geddes 34'; Foster 47'; Marais 52'	Report	Cosslett 9'; Nicolson 17'; Ward 21'; Lints 56'

Umpires:
James Unkles (AUS)
Nicholas Saunders (NZL)

11 December 2022
12:00

Australia	5–1	New Zealand
Geddes 4', 41', 45'; Burns 16'; Foster 35'	Report	Houlbrooke 51'

Umpires:
Nicholas Saunders (NZL)
James Unkles (AUS)

== Goalscorers ==
There were 20 goals scored in 3 matches, for an average of 6.67 goals per match.

5 goals

- (Australia) Cambell Geddes

3 goals

- (Australia) Craig Marais

2 goals

- (Australia) Cooper Burns
- (Australia) Brodee Foster

1 goal

- (Australia) Joshua Brooks
- (New Zealand) Luke Aldred
- (New Zealand) Scott Cosslett
- (New Zealand) Aidan Fraser
- (New Zealand) Isaac Houlbrooke
- (New Zealand) Samuel Lints
- (New Zealand) James Nicolson
- (New Zealand) Patrick Ward

Source: FIH
