= Benjamin White (field hockey) =

Australia field hockey player

Personal information
- Born: 2 October 2000 (age 25) Melbourne, Australia
- Height: 176 cm (5 ft 9 in)
- Weight: 70 kg (154 lb)

Sport
- Sport: Field hockey
- Position: Midfield
Senior career
Years	Team	Caps	Goals
2019–	HC Melbourne	-	-
National team
Years	Team	Caps	Goals
2018–2018	Australia U–18	12	(31)
2019–2019	Australia U–21	5	(0)
2025–	Australia	0	(0)
Medal record
Men's field hockey
Representing Australia

Benjamin 'Ben' White (born 2 October 2000) is a field hockey player from Australia.

== Personal life ==
Benjamin White was in Melbourne, Victoria, and grew up in Blackburn.

He is a scholarship holder at the Victorian Institute of Sport.

== Career ==
=== Domestic league ===
Hailing from Victoria, White plays for the KBH Brumbies. He is captain of the club's senior squad in Hockey Victoria Premier League competition.

At national level, he represents HC Melbourne in Hockey Australia's premier domestic competition, the Liberty Hockey One League. In 2024 he was a member of the championship squad which saw HC Melbourne win the fourth season of the Liberty Hockey One League.

=== Under–18 ===
Throughout 2018, White captained the Australian U–18 side. He led the team to Youth Olympic Games qualification at the Oceania Qualification Tournament in Port Moresby. He then went on to lead the team at the 2018 Summer Youth Olympics in Buenos Aires, with the team ultimately finishing in sixth place.

=== Under–21 ===
White made his first and only appearance for the Australian U–21 side, the Burras, in 2019. He was a member of the squad at an Eight–Nations Invitational Tournament in Madrid.

=== Australia ===
Following a standout Hockey One season in 2024, White was named to the wider Kookaburras squad for 2025. He has since been named to make his debut during the Sydney leg of the 2024–25 FIH Pro League.
