= Brodee Foster =

Australian field hockey player

Personal information
- Born: 21 June 2002 (age 24) Perth, Western Australia, Australia

Sport
- Sport: Field hockey
- Position: Forward
Senior career
Years	Team	Caps	Goals
2017–	Old Aquinians HC	167	185
2022–	Perth Thundersticks	26	15
National team
Years	Team	Caps	Goals
2022–2023	Australia U–21	19	(10)
Medal record
Men's field hockey
Representing Australia
Junior Oceania Cup
Gold medal – first place	2022 Canberra
Sultan of Johor Cup
Silver medal – second place	2022 Johor Bahru
Silver medal – second place	2023 Johor Bahru

Brodee Foster (born 21 June 2002) is a field hockey player from Australia.

He competes in Hockey Australia's premier domestic competition, the ONE Active Hockey One League.

== Personal life ==
Foster was born in Perth, Western Australia.

== Hockey One ==
Throughout his hockey career in Australia, Foster has represented his home state of Western Australia in national championships. In local club competition, he has competed in Perth since his youth.

During his early years he was a member of the Southern River HC. He now represented Old Aquinians HC in the Hockey WA Premier One competition.

Following a successful junior career, Foster made his debut for the Perth Thundersticks in the ONE Active Hockey One League in 2022. During his time in the squad he become one of the franchise's highest goal scorers, and secured a silver medal in his debut season.

== National teams ==
=== Under–21 ===
Foster has also represented Australia at international level. He was a member of the Australian U–21 side, the Burras, from 2022 to 2023.

During his time in the national junior squad, Foster won silver medals at the 2022 and 2023 editions of the Sultan of Johor Cup in Johor Bahru, as well as a gold medal at the 2022 Junior Oceania Cup in Canberra. He also represented the squad at the 2023 FIH Junior World Cup in Kuala Lumpur.

== Career statistics ==
Appearances and goals by club, season and competition
Club	Season			
Club	Season	Division	Apps	Goals
Old Aquinians HC	2017	Hockey WA Premier One	1	0
Old Aquinians HC	2018	Hockey WA Premier One	24	8
Old Aquinians HC	2019	Hockey WA Premier One	16	16
Old Aquinians HC	2020	Hockey WA Premier One	17	14
Old Aquinians HC	2021	Hockey WA Premier One	23	18
Old Aquinians HC	2022	Hockey WA Premier One	23	32
Old Aquinians HC	2023	Hockey WA Premier One	20	30
Old Aquinians HC	2024	Hockey WA Premier One	21	27
Old Aquinians HC	2025	Hockey WA Premier One	6	13
Old Aquinians HC	2026	Hockey WA Premier One	16	27
Old Aquinians HC	Total		167	185
Perth Thundersticks	2022	ONE Active Hockey One	5	1
Perth Thundersticks	2023	ONE Active Hockey One	3	0
Perth Thundersticks	2024	ONE Active Hockey One	8	6
Perth Thundersticks	2025	ONE Active Hockey One	5	3
Perth Thundersticks	2026	ONE Active Hockey One	5	5
Perth Thundersticks	Total		26	15
Career total			193	200
