= Connar Otterbach =

Australia field hockey player

Personal information
- Born: 16 August 2001 (age 25) Melbourne, Australia

Sport
- Sport: Field hockey
- Position: Defence
Senior career
Years	Team	Caps	Goals
2019–	HC Melbourne	-	-
National team
Years	Team	Caps	Goals
2022–2022	Australia U–21	9	(0)
2025–	Australia	0	(0)
Medal record
Men's field hockey
Representing Australia
Junior Oceania Cup
Gold medal – first place	2022 Canberra
Sultan of Johor Cup
Silver medal – second place	2022 Johor Bahru

Connar Otterbach (born 16 August 2001) is a field hockey player from the Australia.

== Personal life ==
Connar Otterbach was in Melbourne, Victoria, and grew up in Altona.

He is a scholarship holder at the Victorian Institute of Sport.

== Career ==
=== Domestic league ===
Hailing from Victoria, Otterbach plays for Altona Hockey Club. He is a member of the club's senior squad in Hockey Victoria Premier League competition.

At national level, he represents HC Melbourne in Hockey Australia's premier domestic competition, the Liberty Hockey One League. In 2024 he was a member of the championship squad which saw HC Melbourne win the fourth season of the Liberty Hockey One League.

=== Under–21 ===
Otterbach made his international debut at under–21 level. He was a member of the silver medal-winning Australian U–21 side, the Burras, at the 2022 Sultan of Johor Cup in Johor Bahru. Later that year he represented the team for the final time, winning gold at the Junior Oceania Cup in Canberra.

=== Australia ===
Following a standout Hockey One season in 2024, Otterbach was named to the wider Kookaburras squad for 2025. He has since been named to make his debut during the Sydney leg of the 2024–25 FIH Pro League.
