= Benjamin Craig =

Australian field hockey player

Personal information
- Full name: Benjamin James Craig
- Born: 9 April 1993 (age 33) Lane Cove, New South Wales

Sport
- Sport: Field hockey
- Position: Midfield
Senior career
Years	Team	Caps	Goals
2015–2018	NSW Waratahs	-	-
2022–	Canberra Chill	-	-
National team
Years	Team	Caps	Goals
2016–2017	Australia	21	(2)
Medal record
Men's field hockey
Representing Australia
Oceania Cup
Gold medal – first place	2017 Sydney

Benjamin James Craig (born 9 April 1993) is a field hockey player from Australia, who plays as a midfielder.

== Personal life ==
Benjamin Craig was born and raised in Lane Cove, New South Wales. His younger brother, Tom, is also an international field hockey player for Australia.

He studied a double degree of Law and International Relations at the University of Sydney. He followed this up with a masters in International Law at Leiden University in the Netherlands.

== Career ==
=== National leagues ===
Craig has represented both the Australian Capital Territory and New South Wales in domestic competitions.

==== AHL ====
From 2015 until the leagues dissolution in 2018, Craig was a member of the NSW Waratahs in the Australian Hockey League. During his AHL career, Craig won one silver and two bronze medals.

==== Hockey One ====
In 2022, Craig was named in the Canberra Chill squad for season two of the Sultana Bran Hockey One.

=== Kookaburras ===
Craig made his international debut for the Kookaburras in 2016 at the Trans–Tasman Trophy in Auckland.

He was added to the national squad for the first time in 2017. He last appeared for the national team later that year at the Oceania Cup in Sydney, where he won a gold medal.

==== International goals ====
Goal	Date	Location	Opponent	Score	Result	Competition	Ref.
1	28 March 2017	Marrara Hockey Centre, Darwin, Australia	Pakistan	5–0	6–1	Test Match	
2	28 March 2017	Marrara Hockey Centre, Darwin, Australia	Pakistan	6–0	6–1	Test Match	
