= 2025 Men's Oceania Cup =

Field hockey tournament

Tournament details
- Host country: Australia
- City: Darwin
- Dates: 4–7 September
- Teams: 2 (from 1 confederation)
- Venue: MWT Hockey Centre

Final positions
- Champions: Australia (13th title)
- Runner-up: New Zealand

Tournament statistics
- Matches played: 3
- Goals scored: 12 (4 per match)
- Top scorer: (Australia) Ky Willott (3 goals)

The 2025 Men's Oceania Cup was the thirteenth edition of the Men's Oceania Cup, the biennial international men's field hockey championship of Oceania organised by the Oceania Hockey Federation. It was held from 4 to 7 September 2025, at the MWT Hockey Centre in Darwin.

The event consisted of a three match series between defending champions and series hosts, Australia, and New Zealand. New Zealand are already qualified for the 2026 FIH World Cup due to the Australian qualification by the 2023–24 FIH Pro League.

Australia continued their dominance of the event, winning their thirteenth straight title.

== Teams ==
Australia

Head Coach: Mark Hager

1. Lachlan Sharp
2. Thomas Craig
3. Corey Weyer
7. Nathan Ephraums
9. Liam Henderson
10. Joshua Beltz
12. Jed Snowden (GK)
13. Blake Govers
16. Timothy Howard
20. Ky Willott
21. Jack Welch
23. Hayden Beltz
24. Cambell Geddes
25. Nathan Czinner
26. James Collins
28. Ashleigh Thomas (GK)
29. Timothy Brand
32. Jeremy Hayward (C)
New Zealand

Head Coach: (South Africa) Greg Nicol

1. Dominic Dixon (GK)
4. Dane Lett
8. Charlie Morrison
9. Samuel Hiha
12. Samuel Lane (C)
13. Simon Yorston
18. Bradley Read
19. Joseph Morrison
23. Dylan Thomas
24. Bradley Rothwell
29. Gus Nelson
30. Finn Ward
32. George Baker
33. Jonty Elmes
34. Malachi Buschl
36. Patrick Ward
38. Benjamin Culhane
40. Matthew Reutsch (GK)

== Results ==
All times are local (UTC+09:30).

=== Standings ===
| Pos | Team | Pld | W | D | L | GF | GA | GD | Pts | Qualification |
|---|---|---|---|---|---|---|---|---|---|---|
| 1 | Australia (Note: Australia is already qualified for the 2026 FIH World Cup as the highest placed nation of the 2023–24 FIH Pro League.) (H, C) | 3 | 3 | 0 | 0 | 10 | 2 | +8 | 9 | |
| 2 | New Zealand | 3 | 0 | 0 | 3 | 2 | 10 | −8 | 0 | 2026 FIH World Cup |

Source: FIH
Rules for classification: 1) points; 2) matches won; 3) goal difference; 4) goals for; 5) head-to-head result; 6) field goals for.
(C) Champions; (H) Hosts

=== Fixtures ===
4 September 2025
18:00

| Australia | 2–0 | New Zealand |
|---|---|---|
| Sharp 5'; Ephraums 54' | Report |

Umpires:
Steve Rogers (AUS)
Bevan Nichol (NZL)

6 September 2025
16:00

| Australia | 4–1 | New Zealand |
|---|---|---|
| Geddes 5'; Willott 23', 44'; Welch 49' | Report | Elmes 51' |

Umpires:
Zeke Newman (AUS)
Bevan Nichol (NZL)

7 September 2025
16:00

| Australia | 4–1 | New Zealand |
|---|---|---|
| Welch 16'; Willott 19'; Govers 26'; Brand 45' | Report | Lane 1' |

Umpires:
Steve Rogers (AUS)
Bevan Nichol (NZL)

== Goalscorers ==
There were 12 goals scored in 3 matches, for an average of 4 goals per match.

3 goals

- (Australia) Ky Willott

2 goals

- (Australia) Jack Welch

1 goal

- (Australia) Tim Brand
- (Australia) Nathan Ephraums
- (Australia) Cambell Geddes
- (Australia) Blake Govers
- (Australia) Lachlan Sharp
- (New Zealand) Jonty Elmes
- (New Zealand) Sam Lane

Source: FIH

== See also ==
- 2025 Women's Oceania Cup
