= Jed Snowden =

Australia field hockey player

Personal information
- Born: 15 August 2001 (age 25) Melbourne, Australia
- Height: 189 cm (6 ft 2 in)
- Weight: 86 kg (190 lb)

Sport
- Sport: Field hockey
- Position: Goalkeeper
Senior career
Years	Team	Caps	Goals
2023–2024	Adelaide Fire	12	0
2025–	HC Melbourne	8	0
National team
Years	Team	Caps	Goals
2021–2022	Australia U–21	9	(0)
2025–	Australia	25	(0)
Medal record
Men's field hockey
Representing Australia
Oceania Cup
Gold medal – first place	2025 Darwin
Junior Oceania Cup
Gold medal – first place	2022 Canberra
Sultan of Johor Cup
Silver medal – second place	2022 Johor Bahru

Jed Snowden (born 15 August 2001) is a field hockey goalkeeper from Australia.

== Personal life ==
Jed Snowden was born and raised in Melbourne, Victoria. He is a scholarship holder at the Victorian Institute of Sport.

== Career ==
=== Domestic league ===
Snowden currently plays club hockey for Essendon Hockey Club in the Hockey Victoria Premier League competition. At national level, he represents Hockey Club Melbourne in the Liberty Hockey One League.

=== Under–18 ===
Snowden was a member of the Australian Youth Squad at the 2018 Summer Youth Olympics in Buenos Aires.

=== Under–21 ===
In 2022, Snowden made his junior international debut. He was a member of the silver medal-winning Australian U–21 side, the Burras, at the 2022 Sultan of Johor Cup in Johor Bahru. Later that year he represented the team again, winning gold at the Junior Oceania Cup in Canberra.

=== Kookaburras ===
Following an overhaul of the national squad following the 2024 Summer Olympics, Snowden was named in the Kookaburras squad for the first time. He will make his senior international debut during season six of the FIH Pro League.
