= Fraser Heigh =

Scottish field hockey player

Personal information
- Born: 22 February 2001 (age 25) Edinburgh, Scotland

Sport
- Sport: Field hockey
- Position: Forward
Senior career
Years	Team	Caps	Goals
2023–	Adelaide Fire	-	-
National team
Years	Team	Caps	Goals
2022	Scotland U–21	5	(0)
2022	Great Britain U–21	6	(2)
Medal record
Men's field hockey
Representing United Kingdom
Sultan of Johor Cup
Bronze medal – third place	2022 Johor Bahru	Team

Fraser Heigh (born 22 February 2001) is a field hockey player from Scotland, who plays as a forward.

== Personal life ==
Fraser Heigh was raised in Edinburgh, Scotland. He is a former student of George Watson's College.

== Career ==
=== National leagues ===
In his native Scottish National League, Heigh represents Grange.

Heigh moved to Australia in 2023, signing on with the Adelaide Fire for season three of the JDH Hockey One League.

=== Under–21 ===
==== Scotland ====
Heigh made his debut for the Scotland U–21 side at the 2022 EuroHockey Junior Championships in Ghent.

==== Great Britain ====
Following his Scotland junior debut, Heigh went on to represent the Great Britain junior side in 2022 also. He appeared at the Sultan of Johor Cup, winning a bronze medal.
