= Liam Henderson (field hockey) =

Australia field hockey player

Personal information
- Born: 28 August 2003 (age 22) Melbourne, Australia

Sport
- Sport: Field hockey
- Position: Midfield
Senior career
Years	Team	Caps	Goals
2022–	HC Melbourne	-	-
National team
Years	Team	Caps	Goals
2022–2024	Australia U–21	26	(2)
2025–	Australia	0	(0)
Medal record
Men's field hockey
Representing Australia
Oceania Cup
Gold medal – first place	2025 Darwin
Junior Oceania Cup
Gold medal – first place	2022 Canberra
Sultan of Johor Cup
Silver medal – second place	2022 Johor Bahru
Silver medal – second place	2023 Johor Bahru
Silver medal – second place	2024 Johor Bahru

Liam Henderson (born 28 August 2003) is a field hockey player from the Australia.

== Personal life ==
Liam Henderson was in Melbourne, Victoria, and grew up in Glen Iris.

He is a scholarship holder at the Victorian Institute of Sport.

== Career ==
=== Domestic league ===
Henderson currently plays club hockey for Camberwell Hockey Club in the Hockey Victoria Premier League competition. At national level, he represents HC Melbourne in the Liberty Hockey One League.

=== Under–21 ===
Henderson made his international debut at under–21 level. He was a member of the silver medal-winning Australian U–21 side, the Burras, at the 2022 Sultan of Johor Cup in Johor Bahru. Later that year he represented the team again, winning gold at the Junior Oceania Cup in Canberra.

In 2023 he represented the Burras again. He appeared at his second Sultan of Johor Cup, winning silver again, and made his final appearances for the team at the FIH Junior World Cup in Kuala Lumpur.

He made his final appearances for the Burras at his final Sultan of Johor Cup in 2024.

=== Australia ===
Henderson received an official call-up to the Kookaburras squad in 2025.
