= Jayden Atkinson =

Australian field hockey player (born 2001)

Personal information
- Born: 9 July 2001 (age 25) Cairns, Queensland, Australia

Sport
- Sport: Field hockey
- Position: Midfield
Senior career
Years	Team	Caps	Goals
2022–	Brisbane Blaze	-	-
National team
Years	Team	Caps	Goals
2022	Australia U–21	5	(0)
2023–	Australia	5	(0)
Medal record
Men's field hockey
Representing Australia
Oceania Cup
Gold medal – first place	2023 Whangārei

Jayden Atkinson (born 9 July 2001) is an Australian field hockey player, who plays in the midfield.

== Personal life ==
Jayden Atkinson was born and raised in Cairns, Queensland.

== Career ==
=== Under–21 ===
In 2022, Atkinson made his debut for the Australia U–21 team during the Sultan of Johor Cup in Johor Bahru.

=== Kookaburras ===
Following a successful domestic league and junior appearance, Atkinson was added to the Kookaburras squad for 2023. He made his international debut during season three of the FIH Pro League in Hobart.
