= Nathan Ephraums =

Australian field hockey player

Personal information
- Born: 9 June 1999 (age 27) Keysborough, Victoria, Australia

Sport
- Sport: Field hockey
- Position: Forward
- Club: HC Bloemendaal
Senior career
Years	Team	Caps	Goals
2018	VIC Vikings	4	8
2019–2023	HC Melbourne	7	4
2024-present	HC Bloemendaal	-	-
National team
Years	Team	Caps	Goals
2017–2019	Australia U–21	17	(13)
2020-present	Australia	75	(33)
Medal record
Men's field hockey
Representing Australia
Commonwealth Games
Gold medal – first place	2022 Birmingham	Team
Oceania Cup
Gold medal – first place	2023 Whangārei
Gold medal – first place	2025 Darwin

Nathan Ephraums (born 9 June 1999) is an Australian field hockey player, who plays as a forward.

== Personal life ==
Nathan Ephraums was born and raised in Keysborough, Victoria. He attended school at Haileybury College.

He is a current scholarship holder with the Victorian Institute of Sport (VIS).

Nathan's older brother Joshua is also a semi-professional hockey player.

== Career ==
=== Domestic leagues ===
==== Australian Hockey League ====
In 2018, Ephraums made his debut for the VIC Vikings in the Australian Hockey League.

==== Hockey One ====
Following Hockey Australia's overhaul of the AHL and subsequent introduction of the Sultana Bran Hockey One League in 2019, Ephraums was named in the HC Melbourne squad for the inaugural season. The team finished in fourth place, losing in the semi-finals to eventual winners, the NSW Pride.

=== National teams ===
==== Under–21 ====
Nathan Ephruams made his debut for the Australia Under–21 side in 2017, at the Sultan of Johor Cup. At the tournament, the team won a gold medal.

He followed this up with two appearances in 2018, again at the Sultan of Johor Cup, winning a bronze medal, and at an eight nations tournament in Spain in 2019.

=== Kookaburras ===
In November 2019, Ephraums was named in the Kookaburras team for the first time, following one year in the National Development Squad.
