= Davis Atkin =

Australian field hockey player (born 2001)

Personal information
- Born: 17 February 2001 (age 25) York, England

Sport
- Sport: Field hockey
- Position: Midfield
Senior career
Years	Team	Caps	Goals
2022–	Canberra Chill	-	-
National team
Years	Team	Caps	Goals
2022	Australia U–21	3	(0)
2023–	Australia	28	(2)
Medal record
Men's field hockey
Representing Australia
Junior Oceania Cup
Gold medal – first place	2022 Canberra	Team

Davis Atkin (born 17 February 2001) is an Australian field hockey player, who plays as a midfielder.

== Personal life ==
In 2023, Atkin became the first openly gay male field hockey player to compete at an international level.

He is a student at the University of Western Australia.

== Career ==
=== Under–21 ===
In 2022, Atkin made his debut for the Australia U–21 team during the Junior Oceania Cup in Canberra.

=== Kookaburras ===
Following a successful domestic league and junior appearance, Atkin was called into the Kookaburras squad for the first time in 2023. He made his senior international debut during the India leg of season four of the FIH Pro League in Rourkela.

After not representing Australia throughout 2024, Atkin returned to the international stage in 2025. He was named in the National Development Squad by Hockey Australia and has been a regular inclusion in the national squad throughout the season six of the FIH Pro League.

== International goals ==
The following is a list of goals scored by Atkin at international level.

Goal	Date	Location	Opponent	Score	Result	Competition	Ref.
1	6 February 2025	Sydney Olympic Park, Sydney, Australia	Netherlands	2–0	4–2	2024–25 FIH Pro League	
2	18 June 2025	Wilrijkse Plein, Antwerp, Belgium	Ireland	5–1	6–1	2024–25 FIH Pro League	
