= Nathan Czinner =

Australia field hockey player

Personal information
- Born: 19 March 2002 (age 24) Armidale, New South Wales, Australia

Sport
- Sport: Field hockey
- Position: Midfield
Senior career
Years	Team	Caps	Goals
2022–	NSW Pride	-	-
National team
Years	Team	Caps	Goals
2022–2023	Australia U–21	20	(2)
2023–	Australia Indoor	5	(1)
2025–	Australia	27	(0)
Medal record
Men's field hockey
Representing Australia
Oceania Cup
Gold medal – first place	2025 Darwin
Junior Oceania Cup
Gold medal – first place	2022 Canberra
Sultan of Johor Cup
Silver medal – second place	2022 Johor Bahru
Silver medal – second place	2023 Johor Bahru

Nathan Czinner (born 19 March 2002) is a field and indoor hockey player from Australia.

== Personal life ==
Nathan Czinner was born and raised in Armidale, New South Wales.

He is a scholarship holder at the New South Wales Institute of Sport.

== Field hockey ==
=== Domestic league ===
Hailing from New South Wales, Czinner plays represents his home state at national level. He is a member of the NSW Pride in Hockey Australia's premier domestic competition, the Liberty Hockey One League. He has been a member of the squad since 2022.

=== Under–21 ===
Czinner made his international debut at under–21 level. He was a member of the silver medal-winning Australian U–21 side, the Burras, at the 2022 Sultan of Johor Cup in Johor Bahru. Later that year he represented the team again, winning gold at the Junior Oceania Cup in Canberra.

In 2023 he represented the Burras again. He appeared at his second Sultan of Johor Cup, winning silver again, and made his final appearances for the team at the FIH Junior World Cup in Kuala Lumpur.

=== Australia ===
Following a standout Hockey One season in 2024, Czinner was named to the wider Kookaburras squad for 2025. He has since been named to make his debut during the Sydney leg of the 2024–25 FIH Pro League.

== Indoor hockey ==
Czinner made his international indoor hockey debut for Australia in 2023. He was a member of the squad at the FIH Indoor World Cup in Pretoria.
