= Cooper Burns =

Australia field hockey player

Personal information
- Born: 6 March 2002 (age 24) Melbourne, Australia

Sport
- Sport: Field hockey
- Position: Forward
Senior career
Years	Team	Caps	Goals
2022–	HC Melbourne	-	-
National team
Years	Team	Caps	Goals
2022–2023	Australia U–21	20	(17)
Medal record
Men's field hockey
Representing Australia
Junior Oceania Cup
Gold medal – first place	2022 Canberra
Sultan of Johor Cup
Silver medal – second place	2022 Johor Bahru
Silver medal – second place	2023 Johor Bahru

Cooper Burns (born 6 March 2002) is a field hockey player from Australia.

== Personal life ==
Cooper Burns was born in Melbourne, Victoria, and grew up in Altona.

He is a scholarship holder at the Victorian Institute of Sport.

== Career ==
=== Domestic league ===
Burns currently plays club hockey for Altona Hockey Club in the Hockey Victoria Premier League competition. At national level, he represents HC Melbourne in the Liberty Hockey One League.

=== Under–21 ===
Burns made his international debut at under–21 level. He was a member of the silver medal-winning Australian U–21 side, the Burras, at the 2022 Sultan of Johor Cup in Johor Bahru. Later that year he represented the team again, winning gold at the Junior Oceania Cup in Canberra.

In 2023 he represented the Burras again. He appeared at his second Sultan of Johor Cup, winning silver again, and made his final appearances for the team at the FIH Junior World Cup in Kuala Lumpur.

=== Australia ===
Before making his senior international debut for the Kookaburras, Burns was a member of the national development squad. Burns made his senior international debut with the Kookaburras in 2025.
