= Tim Brand =

Australian field hockey player (born 1998)

Personal information
- Full name: Timothy Daniel Brand
- Born: 29 November 1998 (age 27) Gouda, Netherlands

Sport
- Sport: Field hockey
- Position: Forward
- Club: Klein Zwitserland
Senior career
| Years | Team | Caps | Goals |
| 2017–2018 | NSW Waratahs | 11 | 6 |
| 2019–2021 | NSW Pride | 8 | 10 |
| 2021–present | Klein Zwitserland | - | - |
National team
| Years | Team | Caps | Goals |
| 2016 | Australia U21 | 8 | (1) |
| 2018–present | Australia | 45 | (18) |
Medal record
Men's field hockey
Representing Australia
Olympic Games
| Silver medal – second place | 2020 Tokyo | Team |
World Cup
| Bronze medal – third place | 2018 Bhubaneswar |
Commonwealth Games
| Gold medal – first place | 2022 Birmingham | Team |
Oceania Cup
| Gold medal – first place | 2019 Rockhampton |
| Gold medal – first place | 2025 Darwin |
Champions Trophy
| Gold medal – first place | 2018 Breda |
- Updated on 8 August 2022

Timothy Daniel Brand (born 29 November 1998) is an Australian field hockey player who plays as a forward for Dutch club Klein Zwitserland and the Australian national team.

Brand was born in the Netherlands and grew up in Chatswood, New South Wales.

== Club career ==
Brand previously played for the NSW Pride in the Hockey One. After the 2020 Summer Olympics he joined Dutch Hoofdklasse club Klein Zwitserland.

== International career ==
He made his senior international debut in June 2018, in a test series against Germany.

In June 2018, Brand was selected in the Australian national squad for the 2018 Champions Trophy in Breda, Netherlands. The team won the tournament, defeating India 3–1 in a penalty shoot-out after the final finished a 1–1 draw. Tim has been selected in the 2018 Australian Men's Hockey Team to participate at the World Cup, in Odisha 28–16 December.

Brand was selected in the Kookaburras Olympics squad for the Tokyo 2020 Olympics. The team reached the final for the first time since 2004 but couldn't achieve gold, beaten by Belgium in a shootout.
