= Peter Scott (field hockey) =

English field hockey player

Peter Scott (Field Hockey)
Personal information
- Born: 19 January 1997 (age 29)
- Height: 199 cm (6 ft 6 in)

Sport
- Sport: Field hockey
- Position: Midfielder or Forward
Senior career
Years	Team	Caps	Goals
–	Bracknell	-	-
2017–2018	Team Bath Buccaneers	-	-
2018–2020	Reading	-	-
2020-present	Wimbledon	-	-
National team
Years	Team	Caps	Goals
2015–2017	England & GB U21	26	(5)
2017–present	England	5	(0)

Peter Scott (born 19 January 1997) is an English field hockey player who plays as a midfielder or forward for Wimbledon and the England national team.

== Club career ==
Scott played for Team Bath Buccaneers and Bracknell HC.

While at Team Bath Buccaneers he made his England debut on 4 March 2017 playing in a tri-series against Germany and South Africa.

Scott joined Reading in the Men's England Hockey League until the 2020-21 season when he signed for Wimbledon Hockey Club.
