= Cambell Geddes =

Australia field hockey player

Personal information
- Born: 18 June 2002 (age 24) Perth, Western Australia, Australia

Sport
- Sport: Field hockey
- Position: Defence
Senior career
Years	Team	Caps	Goals
2022–	Perth Thundersticks	-	-
National team
Years	Team	Caps	Goals
2022–2023	Australia U–21	20	(13)
2025–	Australia	0	(0)
Medal record
Men's field hockey
Representing Australia
Oceania Cup
Gold medal – first place	2025 Darwin
Junior Oceania Cup
Gold medal – first place	2022 Canberra
Sultan of Johor Cup
Silver medal – second place	2022 Johor Bahru
Silver medal – second place	2023 Johor Bahru

Cambell Geddes (born 18 June 2002) is a field hockey player from Australia.

== Personal life ==
Cambell Geddes was born and raised in Perth, Western Australia.

He is a scholarship holder at the Western Australian Institute of Sport.

== Field hockey ==
=== Domestic league ===
Hailing from Western Australia, Geddes represents his home state at national level. He is a member of the Perth Thundersticks in Hockey Australia's premier domestic competition, the Liberty Hockey One League. He has been a member of the squad since 2022.

=== Under–21 ===
Geddes made his international debut at under–21 level. He was a member of the silver medal-winning Australian U–21 side, the Burras, at the 2022 Sultan of Johor Cup in Johor Bahru. Later that year he represented the team again, winning gold at the Junior Oceania Cup in Canberra.

In 2023, he represented the Burras again. He appeared at his second Sultan of Johor Cup, winning silver again, and made his final appearances for the team at the FIH Junior World Cup in Kuala Lumpur.

=== Australia ===
Geddes has been a member of the National Development Squad since 2024.

Following a standout Liberty Hockey One League season in 2024, Geddes was named to the wider Kookaburras squad for 2025. He has since been named to make his debut during the Santiago del Estero leg of the 2024–25 FIH Pro League.
