= 2022 Sultan of Johor Cup =

Field hockey tournament in Malaysia

Tournament details
- Host country: Malaysia
- City: Johor Bahru
- Dates: 22–29 October
- Teams: 6 (from 4 confederations)
- Venue: Taman Daya Hockey Stadium

Final positions
- Champions: India (3rd title)
- Runner-up: Australia
- Third place: Great Britain

Tournament statistics
- Matches played: 18
- Goals scored: 100 (5.56 per match)
- Top scorer: (India) Sharda Nand Tiwari (7 goals)

The 2022 Sultan of Johor Cup was the tenth edition of the Sultan of Johor Cup, an international men's under–21 field hockey tournament in Malaysia. It was held in Johor Bahru, Malaysia from 22 to 29 October 2022.

As in previous editions, a total of six teams competed for the title.

== Participating nations ==
Including the host nation, 6 teams competed in the tournament.

- Australia
- India
- Great Britain
- Japan
- Malaysia
- South Africa

== Results ==
All times are in Malaysia Standard Time (UTC+8).

=== Preliminary round ===
Pos	Team	Pld	W	D	L	GF	GA	GD	Pts	Qualification
1	Australia	5	4	1	0	25	9	+16	13	Final
2	India	5	2	2	1	24	18	+6	8	Final
3	Great Britain	5	2	1	2	15	13	+2	7	Third place game
4	Japan	5	2	1	2	8	11	−3	7	Third place game
5	South Africa	5	2	0	3	10	16	−6	6	Fifth place game
6	Malaysia (H)	5	0	1	4	7	22	−15	1	Fifth place game

Source: FIH
Rules for classification: 1) points; 2) matches won; 3) goal difference; 4) goals for; 5) head-to-head result; 6) field goals for.
(H) Hosts

22 October 2022
16:05

Australia	3–2	Japan
Holland 15'; Brooks 22'; Burns 43'	Report	Imamatsu 36'; Saeki 59'

Umpires:
Erik Etsebeth (RSA)
Napoleon Chamamthaban (IND)

22 October 2022
18:05

Great Britain	4–1	South Africa
Pendle 12'; Heigh 19'; Penrose 20', 29'	Report	Le Forestier 15'

Umpires:
Muhammad Amirul Rashid (MAS)
Jayden Pearson (AUS)

22 October 2022
20:35

India	5–2	Malaysia
Amandeep 6'; Araijeet 10'; Dhami Boby 20'; Sudeep 26'; Sharda Nand 56'	Report	Suhaimi 13'; Mamat 52'

Umpires:
Salim Lucky (BAN)
Khamis Al Balushi (OMA)

23 October 2022
16:05

Japan	2-1	Great Britain
Saito 17'; Tanaka 27'	Report	Anderson 29'

Umpires:
Khamis Al Balushi (OMA)
Muhammad Amirul Rashid (MAS)

23 October 2022
18:05

India	4–5	South Africa
Sharda Nand 9', 10'; Uttam 17'; Sudeep 45'	Report	Simons 7'; Kahder 34'; Ngubane 35'; Le Forestier 49', 57'

Umpires:
Ahmad Berhaumidin (MAS)

Jayden Pearson (AUS)

23 October 2022
20:35

Australia	8–0	Malaysia
Hart 19', 47'; Lambeth 36'; Burns 44', 55', 58'; Holland 49'; Foster 59'	Report

Umpires:
Salim Lucky (BAN)
Takuma Kato (JPN)

25 October 2022
16:05

Great Britain	1–3	Australia
Robson 18'	Report	Burns 2'; Brooks 27'; Hart 48'

Umpires:
Salim Lucky (BAN)
Erik Etsebeth (RSA)

25 October 2022
18:05

Japan	1–5	India
Saeki 15'	Report	Uttam 3'; Rohit 12'; Johnson 21'; Dhami Boby 31'; Amandeep 51'

Umpires:
Khamis Al Balushi (OMA)
Jayden Pearson (AUS)

25 October 2022
20:35

South Africa	3–1	Malaysia
Davis 23'; Simons 35'; Le Forestier 53'	Report	Mamat 24'

Umpires:
Napoleon Chanamthabam (IND)
Takuma Kato (JPN)

26 October 2022
16:05

India	5–5	Australia
Dhami Boby 2'; Sharda Nand 8', 35'; Araijeet Singh Hundal 18'; Amandeep 60'	Report	Hart 3'; Holland 8'; Brooks 20', 41'; Lambeth 49'

Umpires:
Erik Etsebeth (RSA)
Muhammad Amirul Rashid (MAS)

26 October 2022
18:05

Malaysia	2–4	Great Britain
Muhammad 50'; Suhaimi 53'	Report	Moorhouse 2'; Newbold 17'; J. Golden 34'; Stone 43'

Umpires:
Napoleon Chanamthabam (IND)
Takuma Kato (JPN)

26 October 2022
20:35

South Africa	0–1	Japan
	Report	Kawahara 51'

Umpires:
Jayden Pearson (AUS)
Ahmad Barhaumidin (MAS)

28 October 2022
16:05

Great Britain	5–5	India
Anderson 1', 40'; Stone 42'; J. Golden 54', 56'	Report	Poovanna 7'; Amandeep 50'; Araijeet Singh Hundal 53'; Sharda Nand 56', 58'

Umpires:
Ahmad Berhaumidin (MAS)
Erik Etsebeth (RSA)

28 October 2022
18:05

Malaysia	2–2	Japan
Mamat 39'; Suhaimi 43'	Report	Kobayashi 34'; Saeki 47'

Umpires:
Khamis Al Balushi (OMA)
Salim Lucky (BAN)

28 October 2022
20:35

Australia	6–1	South Africa
Hart 2'; Geddes 26', 59'; Foster 41'; Burns 56'; Holland 57'	Report	Davis 52'

Umpires:
Napoleon Chanamthabam (IND)
Takuma Kato (JPN)

=== Classification round ===
==== Fifth and sixth place ====
29 October 2022
15:35

South Africa	3–2	Malaysia
Raath 11', 36'; Neethling 25'	Report	Mamat 12'; Zulhanif 56'

Umpires:
Khamis Al Balushi (OMA)
Jayden Pearson (AUS)

==== Third and fourth place ====
29 October 2022
18:05

Great Britain	3–1	Japan
Heigh 2'; Vallely 5'; J. Golden 50'	Report	Saeki 48'

Umpires:
Ahmad Berhaumidin (MAS)
Muhammad Amirul Rashid (MAS)

==== Final ====
29 October 2022
20:35

Australia	1–1	India
Holland 29'	Report	Sudeep 14'
Penalties
Burns (penalty shoot-out missed); Hart (penalty shoot-out scored); Atkinson (penalty shoot-out missed); Brooks (penalty shoot-out scored); Foster (penalty shoot-out scored); Hart (penalty shoot-out missed); Burns (penalty shoot-out scored); Foster (penalty shoot-out missed); Brooks (penalty shoot-out missed)	4–5	(penalty shoot-out scored) Vishnukant; (penalty shoot-out missed) Sudeep; (penalty shoot-out scored) Uttam; (penalty shoot-out missed) Dhami Boby; (penalty shoot-out scored) Ankit; (penalty shoot-out missed) Vishnukant; (penalty shoot-out scored) Uttam; (penalty shoot-out missed) Dhami Boby; (penalty shoot-out scored) Sudeep

Umpires:
Salim Lucky (BAN)
Erik Etsebeth (RSA)

== Final standings ==
Pos	Team
1	India
2	Australia
3	Great Britain
4	Japan
5	South Africa
6	Malaysia (H)

Source: FIH
(H) Host

== Goalscorers ==
There were 100 goals scored in 18 matches, for an average of 5.56 goals per match.

7 goals

- (India) Sharda Nand Tiwari

6 goals

- (Australia) Cooper Burns

5 goals

- (Australia) Liam Hart
- (Australia) Jack Holland

4 goals

- (Australia) Joshua Brooks
- (United Kingdom) Jamie Golden
- (Japan) Ikumi Saeki
- (Malaysia) Muhammad Mamat
- (South Africa) Cameron Le Forestier

3 goals

- (United Kingdom) Max Anderson
- (India) Amandeep
- (India) Sudeep Chirmako
- (India) Dhami Boby Singh
- (India) Araijeet Singh Hundal
- (Malaysia) Shahmie Irfan Suhaimi

2 goals

- (Australia) Brodee Foster
- (Australia) Cambell Geddes
- (Australia) Jake Lambeth
- (United Kingdom) Fraser Heigh
- (United Kingdom) Rory Penrose
- (United Kingdom) Harrison Stone
- (India) Uttam Singh
- (South Africa) Calvin Davis
- (South Africa) Niel Raath
- (South Africa) Marvin Simons

1 goal

- (United Kingdom) Tom Moorhouse
- (United Kingdom) Fred Newbold
- (United Kingdom) Alex Pendle
- (United Kingdom) Ellis Robson
- (United Kingdom) James Vallely
- (India) Poovanna BC
- (India) Amandeep Lakra
- (India) Johnson Purty
- (India) Rohit null
- (Japan) Yu Imamatsu
- (Japan) Yamato Kawahara
- (Japan) Masato Kobayashi
- (Japan) Hiro Saito
- (Japan) Tsubasa Tanaka
- (Malaysia) Danish Muhammad
- (Malaysia) Sahran Zulhanif
- (South Africa) Fawaaz Kahder
- (South Africa) Hans Neethling
- (South Africa) Senswesihle Ngubane

Source: FIH

== See also ==
- 2022 Sultan Azlan Shah Cup
