= Tim Howard (field hockey) =

Australian field hockey player (born 1996)

Personal information
- Born: 23 June 1996 (age 30) Brisbane, Queensland, Australia

Sport
- Sport: Field hockey
- Position: Defender
- Club: QLD Blades
National team
Years	Team	Caps	Goals
2014	Australia U18	11	(8)
2014–2016	Australia U21	27	(0)
2017–	Australia	66	(1)
Medal record
Men's field hockey
Representing Australia
Olympic Games
Silver medal – second place	2020 Tokyo	Team
Commonwealth Games
Gold medal – first place	2022 Birmingham	Team
Bronze medal – third place	2018 Bhubaneswar	Team
FIH Pro League
Gold medal – first place	2019 Amstelveen	Team
Oceania Cup
Gold medal – first place	2019 Rockhampton
Gold medal – first place	2023 Whangārei
Gold medal – first place	2025 Darwin
Champions Trophy
Gold medal – first place	2018 Breda
Men's Hockey5s
Youth Olympic Games
Gold medal – first place	2014 Nanjing	Team

Tim Howard (born 23 June 1996) is an Australian field hockey player who plays as a defender for the Australian national team.

== Career ==
=== Junior national teams ===
Howard has represented Australia at junior level in both Under 18 and Under 21 age groups.

In 2014, Howard captained the Australia Under 18 side at the 2014 Youth Olympic Games in Nanjing, China. The team won the gold medal, defeating Canada 3–2 in a penalty shoot-out following a 3–3 draw.

Howard also made his debut for the Australian Under 21 side, 'The Burras', in 2014 at the Sultan of Johor Cup. Howard also competed at the 2015 and 2016 editions of the Sultan of Johor Cup, winning a gold medal in 2016.

In 2016, Howard captained The Burras to victory at the Junior Oceania Cup, which served as a qualifier for the Junior World Cup. Howard was also a member of the team and Captained the Australian Team at the Junior World Cup in Lucknow, India, where the team finished fourth.

=== Senior national team ===
In 2017, Howard made his senior international debut for the Kookaburras at the 2017 International Festival of Hockey.

Since his debut, Howard has been a regular inclusion in the Kookaburras side, most notably winning gold with the team at the 2018 Champions Trophy in Breda, Netherlands.

In November 2018, Howard was named in the squad for the Hockey World Cup in Bhubaneswar, India.

Howard was selected in the Kookaburras Olympics squad for the Tokyo 2020 Olympics. The team reached the final for the first time since 2004 but couldn't achieve gold, beaten by Belgium in a shootout.
