= Australia men's national under-21 field hockey team =

Australian men's national under-21 field hockey team

Australia
- Nickname(s): Burras
- Association: Hockey Australia
- Confederation: OHF (Oceania)
- Head Coach: Vacant
- Captain: Dylan Downey & Toby Mallon

Junior World Cup
- Appearances: 12 (first in 1982)
- Best result: (gold) 1st (1997)
Medal record
Junior World Cup
Gold medal – first place	1997 Milton Keynes
Silver medal – second place	1982 Kuala Lumpur
Silver medal – second place	1989 Ipoh
Silver medal – second place	2005 Rotterdam
Bronze medal – third place	1993 Terrassa
Bronze medal – third place	2009 Johor Bahru–Singapore

The Australia men's national under-21 field hockey team, represents Australia in international under-21 field hockey and at the Junior World Cup. The team is controlled by the governing body for field hockey in Australia, Hockey Australia, which is currently a member of the Oceania Hockey Federation (OHF) and the International Hockey Federation (FIH). The team's official nickname is the Burras.

The team's first recorded appearance was at the 1982 Junior World Cup, where the team won a silver medal.

== Tournament record ==
=== FIH Hockey Junior World Cup ===
- 1979 – Did not participate.
- 1982 – (silver)
- 1985 – 4th place
- 1989 – (silver)
- 1993 – (bronze)
- 1997 – (gold)
- 2001 – 6th place
- 2005 – (silver)
- 2009 – (bronze)
- 2013 – 5th place
- 2016 – 4th place
- 2021 – Withdrew due to the COVID-19 pandemic.
- 2023 – 6th place
- 2025 – 11th place (Note: Australia finished second in Pool F with two wins and one loss. Under the expanded 24-team format, only the six pool winners and two highest-ranked runners-up advanced to the quarter-finals. Australia entered the 9th–16th-place classification and finished 11th overall.)
- 2027 – Qualified

=== Junior Oceania Cup ===
- 1988 – (gold)
- 1992 – (gold)
- 1997 – (gold)
- 2001 – (gold)
- 2004 – (gold)
- 2008 – (gold)
- 2013 – (gold)
- 2016 – (gold)
- 2022 – (gold)
- 2025 – (gold)
- 2026 – (gold)

=== Sultan of Johor Cup ===
- 2011 – (silver)
- 2012 – (bronze)
- 2013 – Did not compete.
- 2014} – (bronze)
- 2015 – 5th place
- 2016 – (gold)
- 2017 – (gold)
- 2018 – (bronze)
- 2019 – 5th place
- 2020 – Tournament cancelled due to the COVID-19 pandemic.
- 2021 – Tournament cancelled due to the COVID-19 pandemic.
- 2022 – (bronze)
- 2023 – (bronze)
- 2024 – (bronze)
- 2025 – (gold)

== Team ==
=== Current squad ===
The following 18 players were named in the Burras squad for the FIH Junior World Cup in Kuala Lumpur. The squad was announced on 17 November 2023.

Caps and goals updated as of 14 December 2023, following the match against Pakistan.

No.	Pos.	Player	Date of birth (age)	Caps	Goals	Club
27	GK	Oliver Higgins	13 October 2002 (aged 20)	9	0	(Australia) Suburban Lions
28	GK	Max Larkin	16 May 2003 (aged 19)	10	0	(Australia) Tassie Tigers
1	DF	Nye Roberts	24 January 2003 (aged 19)	10	0	(Australia) HC Melbourne
12	DF	Angus Adamson	2 July 2003 (aged 19)	10	0	(Australia) YMCC
13	DF	Dylan Downey	26 January 2005 (aged 17)	10	2	(Australia) NSW Pride
23	DF	Cambell Geddes	18 June 2002 (aged 20)	19	13	(Australia) Perth Thundersticks
25	DF	Michael Taylor	19 January 2002 (aged 20)	10	0	(Australia) Brisbane Blaze
2	MF	William Mathison	12 June 2002 (aged 20)	10	2	(Australia) Brisbane Blaze
6	MF	Liam Henderson	28 August 2003 (aged 19)	19	0	(Australia) HC Melbourne
7	MF	Lachlan Rogers	24 August 2004 (aged 18)	10	0	(Australia) Tassie Tigers
8	MF	Toby Mallon	20 July 2005 (aged 17)	14	0	(Australia) Briars
11	MF	Max Freedman	19 March 2003 (aged 19)	13	0	(Australia) YMCC
16	MF	Nathan Czinner	19 March 2002 (aged 20)	19	2	(Australia) NSW Pride
19	MF	Craig Marais (C)	28 May 2002 (aged 20)	13	6	(Australia) HC Melbourne
5	FW	Jake Lambeth	30 August 2002 (aged 20)	11	4	(Australia) Royals
9	FW	Diarmid Chappell	14 November 2003 (aged 19)	10	1	(Australia) Brisbane Blaze
21	FW	Cooper Burns	6 March 2002 (aged 20)	19	16	(Australia) HC Melbourne
24	FW	Brodee Foster	21 June 2002 (aged 20)	18	10	(Australia) Perth Thundersticks
