= Craig Marais (field hockey) =

Australian field hockey player

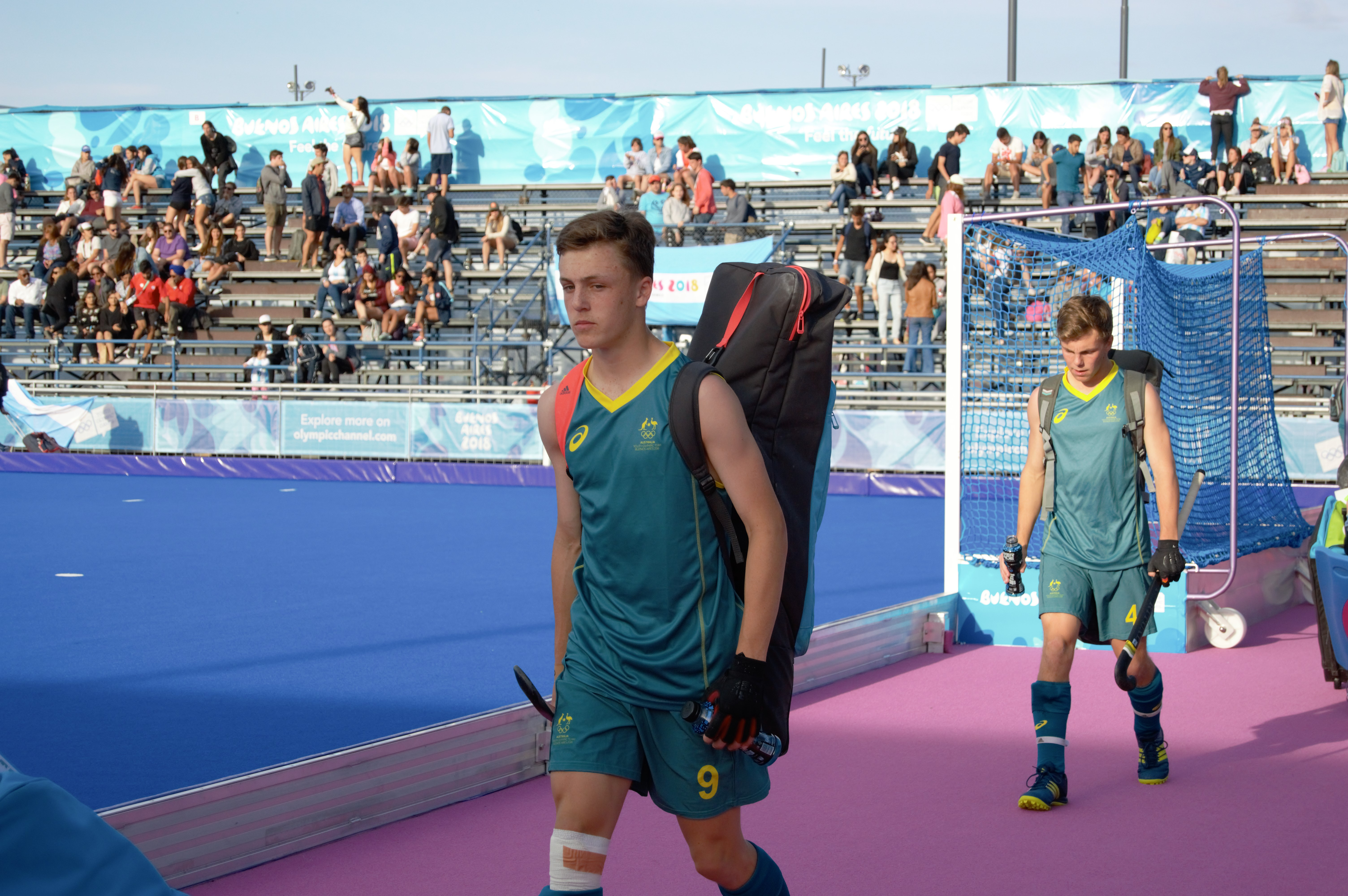
- India and Australia at the Hockey5s tournament at the 2018 Summer Youth Olympics.

Personal information
- Born: 28 May 2002 (age 24) Brighton East, Victoria

Sport
- Sport: Field hockey
- Position: Forward
Senior career
Years	Team	Caps	Goals
2019–	HC Melbourne	-	-
National team
Years	Team	Caps	Goals
2018	Australia U–18	7	(2)
2022–	Australia	4	(0)
Medal record
Men's field hockey
Representing Australia

Craig Marais (born 28 May 2002) is a field hockey player from Australia, who plays as a forward.

== Personal life ==
Craig Marais was born and raised in Brighton East, Victoria.

He attended Brighton Grammar School, is currently studying business at Monash University. His brother Bradley also is an international hockey player.

== Career ==
=== Domestic hockey ===
In 2019, Marais was a member of the HC Melbourne team for the inaugural season of the Sultana Bran Hockey One League.

=== National teams ===
==== Under–18 ====
Craig Marais made his debut for Australia in 2018, where he was a member of the Under–18 team at the Youth Olympics in Buenos Aires.

==== Kookaburras ====
In 2022, Marais was named in the Kookaburras for the first time. In April of that year, he made his senior international debut in a test series against Malaysia in Perth.
