= Hockey Club Melbourne =

Australian field hockey club

HC Melbourne
- Full name: Hockey Club Melbourne
- League: Hockey One
- Founded: 17 April 2019; 7 years ago
- Home ground: State Netball and Hockey Centre, Melbourne, Australia (Capacity 8,000)
- Website: hockeyvictoria.org.au

HC Melbourne is an Australian professional field hockey club based in Melbourne, Victoria. The club was established in 2019, and is one of 7 clubs to compete in Hockey Australia's premier domestic competition, Hockey One.

The club unifies both men and women under one name, unlike Victoria's former representation in the Australian Hockey League as the VIC Vikings (men) and VIC Vipers (women).

HC Melbourne competed for the first time in the inaugural season of Hockey One, which was contested from late September through to mid November 2019.

== History ==
HC Melbourne, along with six other teams, was founded on 17 April 2019 as part of Hockey Australia's development of hockey.

HC Melbourne opted for a pure hockey club name, with a view to attracting the Victoria hockey public community whom CEO Andrew Skillern said "showed the rest of the country and the world what we can achieve by getting behind the home team and filling the stands as part of the 2019 FIH Pro League and we cannot wait to have the same support in the new league. The club logo includes 'M' for Melbourne.

Hockey Victoria had over 1,400 inaugural HC Melbourne members before the launch of the club. Hockey Victoria had strong aspirations to double their membership base before the season’s opening match, matching the club's bold identity.

== Uniform ==
HC Melbourne's colours are black and white with gold. The uniform moves away from Victoria's traditional navy blue.

HC Melbourne Men's Uniform	HC Melbourne Women's Uniform

== Home Stadium ==
HC Melbourne are based out of the State Netball and Hockey Centre in Victoria's capital city, Melbourne. The stadium has a capacity of 8,000 spectators, with 1,000 fixed seats.

Throughout the Hockey One league, HC Melbourne plays a number of home games at the stadium.

== Teams ==
=== Men's team ===
The following players were named in the men's squad.

No.	Pos.	Nation	Player
1	FW	AUS	Craig Marais
2	MF	AUS	Max Henry
3	DF	AUS	Simon Borger
5	MF	AUS	Andrew Philpott
8	MF	AUS	Joshua Pollard
13	DF	AUS	Jayshaan Randhawa

No.	Pos.	Nation	Player
14	DF	AUS	Jonathan Bretherton
15	DF	AUS	Josh Simmonds
17	FW	AUS	Kiran Arunasalam
18	GK	AUS	Johan Durst
21	FW	AUS	Jake Sherren
23	DF	AUS	Joel Carroll
24	FW	AUS	James Knee
25	FW	AUS	Aaron Kleinschmidt
29	DF	AUS	Oscar Wookey

=== Women's team ===
The following players were named in the women's preliminary squad.

No.	Pos.	Nation	Player
—	MF	AUS	Laura Barden
—	MF	AUS	Kristina Bates
—	DF	AUS	Kary Chau
—	FW	NZL	Hannah Cotter
—	FW	AUS	Olivia Downes
—	DF	AUS	Josie Erbsland
—	MF	AUS	Gracie Geddis
—	FW	AUS	Zara Geddis
—	MF	NZL	Hannah Gravenall
—	DF	AUS	Emily Hamilton-Smith
—	DF	AUS	Alannah Hibbard
—	MF	AUS	Charlotte Hodgson
—	GK	AUS	Rene Hunter

No.	Pos.	Nation	Player
—	FW	AUS	Dacia Koelmeyer
—	DF	AUS	Josie Lawton
—	MF	AUS	Charlotte Hodgson
—	GK	AUS	Emma Leighton
—	GK	AUS	Rachael Lynch
—	DF	AUS	Evie Stansby
—	FW	GER	Charlotte Stapenhorst
—	DF	AUS	Sophie Taylor
—	FW	IRL	Aisling Utri
—	MF	AUS	Ciara Utri
—	MF	AUS	Zali Ward
—	DF	AUS	Bianca Zurrer
