= 2025 Men's FIH Hockey Junior World Cup squads =

This article lists the confirmed squads for the 2025 Men's FIH Hockey Junior World Cup tournament held in Chennai and Madurai in Tamil Nadu, India between 28 November to 10 December 2025.

A flag is included for coaches that are of a different nationality than their own national team. Those marked in bold have been capped at full international level.

== Pool A ==
=== Canada ===
Canada announced their final squad on 8 October 2025.

Head coach: Geoff Matthews

No.	Pos.	Player	Date of birth (age)	Caps	Club
2	DF	Joshua Miranda	7 February 2004 (aged 21)	18	(Canada) Toronto Lions
3	MF	Lucas Aardenburg	24 June 2005 (aged 20)	7	(Australia) North East
4	DF	Grant Simpson (Captain)	27 April 2004 (aged 21)	23	(Canada) Victoria Vikes
6	DF	Gavin Thind	11 November 2006 (aged 19)	0	(Canada) Surinder Lions
8	MF	Noah Luoie	18 March 2005 (aged 20)	18	(Canada) UBC Thunderbirds
9	MF	Leighton De Souza	4 September 2005 (aged 20)	23	(Canada) OKD
10	FW	Robin Thind	8 May 2006 (aged 19)	18	(Canada) Surinder Lions
11	FW	Josiah Campbell	20 February 2007 (aged 18)	5	(Canada) Saracens
12	MF	Brooklyn Aranha	19 September 2004 (aged 21)	10	(Canada) Burnaby Lake
13	MF	Kale Simonson	23 December 2005 (aged 19)	5	(Canada) UBC Thunderbirds
14	FW	Parmveer Basra	29 December 2004 (aged 20)	5	(Canada) Panthers
15	FW	Ravpreet Gill	24 December 2004 (aged 20)	22	(Canada) Brampton
21	MF	Gurnoor Bhullar	19 June 2007 (aged 18)	0	(Canada) Surinder Lions
23	DF	Harjas Sanghera	2 July 2005 (aged 20)	5	(Canada) UBC Thunderbirds
29	DF	Gurwinder, Brar	29 August 2005 (aged 20)	5	(Canada) OKD
31	GK	Morgan Garside	23 April 2006 (aged 19)	5	(England) Wotton-Under-Edge
34	FW	Navdip Chandi	8 July 2006 (aged 19)	12	(Canada) OKD
89	GK	Stanley Cooke	10 February 2004 (aged 21)	9	(England) Southgate

Reserves

- Karam Sandhu

=== Germany ===
The squad was announced on 16 October 2025.

Head coach: Mirko Stenzel

No.	Pos.	Player	Date of birth (age)	Caps	Club
3	FW	Ben Hasbach (Captain)	22 June 2005 (aged 20)	19	(Germany) Mannheimer HC
4		Christian Franz	1 March 2004 (aged 21)	20	(Germany) Berliner HC
5		Lenn Hoffmann	7 November 2006 (aged 19)	0	(Germany) Mannheimer HC
7		Justus Warweg	18 December 2006 (aged 19)	0	(Germany) Rot-Weiss Köln
8		Jannik Enaux	22 March 2004 (aged 21)	7	(Germany) HTC Uhlenhorst Mülheim
9		Quirin Nahr	4 October 2004 (aged 21)	0	(Germany) Münchner SC
10	MF	Paul Glander (Captain)	12 April 2005 (aged 20)	20	(Germany) Harvestehuder THC
11		Paul Babic	31 March 2006 (aged 19)	0	(Germany) Rot-Weiss Köln
12		Titus Wex	24 October 2005 (aged 20)	5	(Germany) Harvestehuder THC
13		Jonas von Gersum	23 January 2005 (aged 20)	0	(Germany) Harvestehuder THC
16		Nicolaus Hansen	24 April 2006 (aged 19)	5	(Germany) Club an der Alster
18		Ferdinand Steinebach	24 August 2006 (aged 19)	0	(Germany) Club an der Alster
22		Niklas Tecklenburg	3 February 2004 (aged 21)	0	(Germany) Uhlenhorster HC
23		Johann Wehnert	16 August 2005 (aged 20)	0	(Germany) Hamburger Polo Club
24		Benedikt Geyer	11 June 2005 (aged 20)	5	(Germany) Mannheimer HC
33		Maximilian Stahmann	17 December 2005 (aged 20)	5	(Germany) HTC Uhlenhorst Mülheim
37		Lukas Kossel	2 March 2005 (aged 20)	0	(Germany) Hamburger Polo Club
42		Alec von Schwerin	12 February 2004 (aged 21)	0	(Germany) Harvestehuder THC
47	GK	Julijan Cerkez	4 July 2005 (aged 20)	0	(Germany) TSV Mannheim
77	GK	Jasper Ditzer	19 April 2006 (aged 19)	3	(Germany) Harvestehuder THC

=== Ireland ===
The squad was announced on 4 November 2025.

Head coach: (South Africa) Neville Rothman

No.	Pos.	Player	Date of birth (age)	Caps	Club
1	GK	Sam Chapman	19 April 2005 (aged 20)	0	
2	GK	James Coffey	8 June 2006 (aged 19)	0	
3		Caspar Beyer	16 November 2004 (aged 21)	0	
4		James Clark	22 January 2004 (aged 21)	10	
5		John Cunningham	23 September 2007 (aged 18)	5	(Ireland) Lisnagarvey
6		Samuel Dale	4 October 2005 (aged 20)	5	
7		Rex Dunlop	18 August 2004 (aged 21)	10	
8		Jake Fulton	19 December 2008 (aged 17)	0	(Ireland) Pembroke Wanderers
9		Jamie Horgan	17 July 2008 (aged 17)	0	
10		Alfie Le Quesne	5 April 2008 (aged 17)	0	
11		Matthew McKee	15 February 2005 (aged 20)	5	
12		Noa Mulvey	30 April 2008 (aged 17)	0	
13		Toby O'Connell	17 November 2008 (aged 17)	0	(Ireland) Pembroke Wanderers
14	FW	Louis Rowe	28 June 2004 (aged 21)	10	
15		Milo Thompson	13 August 2007 (aged 18)	0	(Ireland) Lisnagarvey
16		Ben Walker	26 November 2005 (aged 20)	0	
17		Gregory Williams	26 November 2005 (aged 20)	0	
18		Ryan Williams	16 August 2006 (aged 19)	0	
19		Thomas Dobson	23 February 2005 (aged 20)	5	
20		Joshua Gill	30 March 2005 (aged 20)	5	

=== South Africa ===
The squad was announced on 17 October 2015.

Head coach: Guy Elliott

No.	Pos.	Player	Date of birth (age)	Caps	Club
2	GK	Johannes Schoeman	1 April 2004 (aged 21)	0	(South Africa) UP Tuks
3		Zeke Hougaard	4 February 2005 (aged 20)	3	(South Africa) Central
4		Casey Keevy	6 February 2004 (aged 21)	0	(South Africa) Maties
5		Jamie Seale	29 August 2004 (aged 21)	5	(South Africa) UP Tuks
6		Leruo Ditlhakanyane	20 July 2005 (aged 20)	10	(South Africa) Varsity College
7		Jaydon Brooker	3 April 2005 (aged 20)	6	(South Africa) NWU Pukke
8		Daniel Neuhoff (Captain)	3 October 2004 (aged 21)	11	
9		Sian Maart	30 March 2004 (aged 21)	10	(South Africa) UP Tuks
10		Carlon Mentoor	18 January 2004 (aged 21)	4	(England) Brooklands
11		Brett Horn	3 November 2004 (aged 21)	0	(South Africa) Maties
12		Lethabo Bogacwi	29 May 2006 (aged 19)	0	(South Africa) Varsity College
13		Ross Montgomery	1 June 2004 (aged 21)	9	(South Africa) Maties
16		Litha Kraai	24 September 2007 (aged 18)	0	(South Africa) SACS
18	GK	Daniel Dillon	23 January 2004 (aged 21)	0	(South Africa) Maties
20		Sachin Padayachee	8 July 2004 (aged 21)	0	(South Africa) NMU Madibaz
25		Taine Tanner-Ellis	5 June 2005 (aged 20)	0	(South Africa) UP Tuks
29		Ozair Pillai	29 June 2005 (aged 20)	0	(South Africa) UP Tuks
30		Lumi Matwele	22 January 2006 (aged 19)	0	(South Africa) Varsity College
44		Daniel den Bakker	27 April 2004 (aged 21)	0	(South Africa) UP Tuks
66		Reuben Sendzul	12 June 2006 (aged 19)	0	

== Pool B ==
=== Chile ===
Head coach: Matías Amoroso

16. Felipé Richard (C)
19. Axel Stein
23. Javier Vargas
31. Lucas Luders
33. Gaspar Fosalba
36. Tomás Hasson
37. Arnau Labbe
39. Nicolás Troncoso (GK)
40. Felipé Duisberg
41. Sebastian Loehnert (C)
42. Gaspar Carvajal
43. Tomás Taborga
44. León Taladriz
45. Santiago Pizarro
46. Vicente Wilhelmy
47. Simón Frenk (GK)
61. Ignacio Fariña
62. Juan Kouyoumdjian Velasco

=== India ===
The squad was announced on 14 November 2025.

Head coach: P. R. Sreejesh

1. Sharda Nand Tiwari
4. Talem Priyobarta
6. Amir Ali
7. Gurjot Singh
8. Manmeet Singh
12. Sourabh Anand Kushwaha
13. Thounaojam Luwang
15. Ankit Pal
16. Prince Deep Singh (GK)
17. Sunil Palakshappa Bennur
21. Rosan Kujur
22. Dilraj Singh
23. Rohit (C)
25. Ajeet Yadav
30. Rohit Kullu
35. Anmol Ekka
44. Arshdeep Singh
55. Ravneet Singh
60. Adrohit Ekka
88. Bikramjit Singh (GK)

=== Switzerland ===
Head coach: Jaïr Levie

2. Clemént Thijs
5. Maurizio Ribaudo
6. Louis Thijs
8. Léonard Kraxner
12. Jens Flück (C)
13. Frederik von Strantz
17. Jonathan Baumbach
19. Ben Gasser
20. Yannick Hug (C)
21. Lionel Krneta (GK)
24. Pascal Gremlich
26. Fritz Eickhoff
29. Alessio Brunold
32. Timo Graf (GK)
34. Victor Herzog
39. Mattia Ribaudo
40. Jonathan Kleschin
41. Max Fischbach
43. Corsin Rauch
46. Cedrix Eichenberger

== Pool C ==
=== Argentina ===
The squad was announced on 27 October 2025.

Head coach: Juan Ignacio Gilardi

No.	Pos.	Player	Date of birth (age)	Caps	Club
2		Lorenzo Somaini	12 December 2005 (aged 20)	12	(Argentina) San Fernando
4		Luca Dulor	17 April 2009 (aged 16)	0	(Argentina) San Martín de Tucumán
5		Nicolás Rodríguez	7 November 2005 (aged 20)	22	(Argentina) Córdoba Athletic Club
6		Thiago Zalazar	8 December 2004 (aged 21)	12	(Argentina) S.A.G. Polvorines
7		Lautaro Martínez	10 September 2004 (aged 21)	12	(Argentina) Obras
8		Tomás Ruiz (Captain)	6 May 2004 (aged 21)	22	(Argentina) Mitre
9		Joaquín Costa	21 May 2007 (aged 18)	5	(Argentina) La Salle
10		Santiago Fernández	16 April 2005 (aged 20)	12	
11		Mateo Serrano	2 October 2005 (aged 20)	12	
12	GK	Lucas Boretti	29 March 2004 (aged 21)	0	
14		Teo Barrena	7 January 2005 (aged 20)	7	
15	GK	Joaquín Ruiz	6 May 2004 (aged 21)	22	
16		Joaquín Barberis	7 August 2006 (aged 19)	5	
17		Juan Boretti	29 March 2004 (aged 21)	5	
18		Mateo Torrigiani	15 April 2006 (aged 19)	5	
19		Federico Hanselmann	22 January 2005 (aged 20)	0	
20		Matías Andreotti	9 March 2005 (aged 20)	12	
21		Bruno Correa	18 May 2004 (aged 21)	12	
23		Facundo Falchetto	5 June 2004 (aged 21)	0	
24		Juan Fernández	24 July 2004 (aged 21)	22	

=== Japan ===
The squad was announced on 29 October 2025.

Head coach: Yoshihiro Anai

1. Kyoya Toya
2. Kazato Baba (GK)
4. Yamato Kawahara (C)
5. Ryuji Tanaka
6. Naru Kimura
7. Atsuki Yamanaka
8. Rakusei Yamanaka
9. Kazuki Terasaka
10. Shogo Sasaki
11. Yuto Higuchi
13. Kazuki Nakai
14. Shu Ono
15. Rei Ninomiya
16. Koki Nishimura
17. Shun Hara
21. Matsuki Mori
25. Neo Sato
27. Yuma Fujiwara
35. Ryosuke Shinohara
99. Tomoya Matsushita (GK)

=== New Zealand ===
The squad was announced on 29 September 2025.

Head coach: Mike Delaney

No.	Pos.	Player	Date of birth (age)	Caps	Club
1		Ryan Parr	5 March 2005 (aged 20)	29	
2		Dean Clarkson	5 April 2005 (aged 20)	15	
4		Owen Brown	2 August 2005 (aged 20)	15	
5		Scott Illerbrun	29 April 2006 (aged 19)	6	
7		Javahn Jones	13 October 2004 (aged 21)	15	
8		Milan Patel	8 February 2004 (aged 21)	15	
11		Jakarta Klebert	12 December 2004 (aged 21)	9	
12		Finlay Neale	28 February 2006 (aged 19)	9	
13		Sam Lints	4 March 2004 (aged 21)	29	
14	DF	Bradley Rothwell	11 November 2004 (aged 21)	15	
16		Jordan Whittleston	29 December 2004 (aged 21)	18	
18		Rocco Ludolph	31 December 2004 (aged 21)	9	
19	FW	Jonty Elmes	10 November 2004 (aged 21)	17	
20		Aiden Bax	4 September 2005 (aged 20)	26	
21	MF	Gus Nelson	31 March 2004 (aged 21)	26	
22		Nicholas Stephenson	14 June 2004 (aged 21)	6	
23	GK	Matthew Ruetsch	30 December 2004 (aged 21)	15	
24	GK	Hugh Nixon	28 July 2004 (aged 21)	6	

== Pool D ==
=== Belgium ===
The squad was announced on 20 October 2025.

Head coach: (Australia) Sean Dancer

No.	Pos.	Player	Date of birth (age)	Caps	Club
1	GK	Emile Bataille	10 November 2006 (aged 19)	0	(Belgium) Waterloo Ducks
2		Benjamin Thiéry	1 May 2004 (aged 21)	0	(Belgium) Royal Orée HC
4		Guerlain Hawaux	1 September 2005 (aged 20)	0	(Belgium) Royal Beerschot THC
5		Victor Maeyens	12 May 2005 (aged 20)	5	(Belgium) Royal Uccle Sport
6	MF	Lucas Balthazar (Captain)	8 January 2006 (aged 19)	0	(Belgium) Royal Uccle Sport
7	DF	Hugo Labouchere	7 February 2004 (aged 21)	0	(Belgium) R Orée HC
8		Nathan Rogge	8 November 2005 (aged 20)	5	(Belgium) La Gantoise HC
9		Jean Cloetens	29 December 2005 (aged 20)	5	(Belgium) Royal Beerschot THC
10		Maximilian Langer	5 August 2006 (aged 19)	0	(Netherlands) HC Bloemendaal
11		Marin Van Heel	26 May 2006 (aged 19)	0	(Belgium) Waterloo Ducks
12	MF	Nicolas Bogaerts	15 January 2004 (aged 21)	11	(Belgium) KHC Dragons
13	GK	Alexis Van Havere	10 August 2005 (aged 20)	5	(Belgium) Royal Beerschot THC
18		Mathias Francois	30 November 2007 (aged 18)	0	(Belgium) Royal Racing Club Bruxelles
20		Hugues Molenaar	8 June 2005 (aged 20)	0	(Belgium) La Gantoise HC
24		Jayd Poels	15 January 2007 (aged 18)	0	(Belgium) KHC Dragons
30		Mathis Lauwers	23 September 2005 (aged 20)	5	(Belgium) La Gantoise HC
32		Gaspard Cornez-Massant	13 May 2005 (aged 20)	0	(Belgium) Royal Racing Club Bruxelles
33		Charles Langendries	26 April 2006 (aged 19)	6	(Belgium) Waterloo Ducks

=== Egypt ===
Head coach: Ahmed Zakaria

1. Ibrahim Alaa (GK)
2. Ahmed Soliman
3. Moustafa Eldallash
5. Ziad Salem
7. Ahmed Fahmy
8. Gamal Ali
9. Abdelrahman Kasem
10. Basel Abdelmonem (C)
11. Mohab Hegab
13. Mohamed Hassanein
14. Mohamed Ghanem
16. Shehab Mohamed (GK)
18. Mohamed Hassan
20. Youssef Hussein
22. Ahmed Fouda
25. Hussein Mohamed
29. Ebraheem Arafaat (GK)
30. Marawan Hussein
31. Ahmed Gaballa
32. Khaled Shalan

=== Namibia ===
The squad was announced on 11 November 2025.

Head coach: Johann Weyhe

No.	Pos.	Player	Date of birth (age)	Caps	Club
1	GK	Rylan Bombosch	6 October 2006 (aged 19)	0	
2	GK	Lyle Bruys	18 May 2007 (aged 18)	0	
3		Liam Bruys	12 December 2008 (aged 17)	0	
4		James de Jager	2 August 2005 (aged 20)	0	
5		Anton Myburgh	26 November 2004 (aged 21)	0	
6		Christiano Festus	15 August 2005 (aged 20)	0	
7		Ludwig van Rooyen	3 January 2007 (aged 18)	0	
8		John-Paul Britz (Captain)	14 July 2004 (aged 21)	0	(South Africa) UJ
9		Josh van der Merwe	7 April 2004 (aged 21)	0	
10		Christian du Raan	5 November 2004 (aged 21)	0	
11		Hilton Lima	10 March 2006 (aged 19)	0	
12		Jack Fourie	23 March 2005 (aged 20)	0	
13		Mathew Lassen	5 June 2007 (aged 18)	0	
14		Zach Philander	30 January 2008 (aged 17)	0	
15		Gerhard Myburgh	26 November 2004 (aged 21)	0	
16		Johan Junius	5 January 2006 (aged 19)	0	
17		Abraham Graham	26 February 2008 (aged 17)	0	
18		Derick Nell	31 July 2008 (aged 17)	0	

=== Spain ===
The squad was announced on 3 November 2025.

Head coach: Oriol Torras

No.	Pos.	Player	Date of birth (age)	Caps	Club
1	GK	Jan Capellades	24 March 2004 (aged 21)	17	(Spain) Club Egara
2		Matías Barón	17 April 2006 (aged 19)	11	(Spain) Real Club de Polo
3		Aleix Bozal	29 June 2004 (aged 21)	15	(Spain) Júnior FC
4		Guiu Corominas (Captain)	6 June 2004 (aged 21)	15	(Spain) Atlètic Terrassa
5		Josep Martín	31 January 2005 (aged 20)	0	(Spain) CD Terrassa
6		Nil Recasens	18 January 2005 (aged 20)	0	(Belgium) Royal Penguin
7		Andrés Medina	12 July 2006 (aged 19)	0	(Spain) CCVM
8	MF	Pere Amat	17 September 2004 (aged 21)	20	(Spain) Club Egara
10		Nicolas Mustarós	27 October 2005 (aged 20)	0	(Spain) Júnior FC
11		Pablo Román	3 July 2004 (aged 21)	5	(Spain) Sanse Complutense
12		Ton Moran	11 January 2006 (aged 19)	11	(Spain) Club Egara
15		Juan Vilallonga	29 June 2006 (aged 19)	0	(Spain) RC Jolaseta
16		Marc Martín	5 September 2007 (aged 18)	0	(Spain) Atlètic Terrassa
17		Mario Mena	27 April 2005 (aged 20)	5	(Spain) CD Terrassa
18		Juan Prado	18 October 2006 (aged 19)	0	(Spain) RC Jolaseta
19		Juan Vilallonga	29 June 2006 (aged 19)	4	(Spain) RC Jolaseta
20		Ignacio Pujol	1 February 2006 (aged 19)	0	(Spain) Júnior FC
21		Santi Martín	29 March 2006 (aged 19)	0	
23	DF	Bruno Ávila	21 January 2004 (aged 21)	5	(Spain) Real Club de Polo
26		Albert Serrahima	1 January 2006 (aged 19)	0	(Spain) Júnior FC
27	GK	Diego Palomero	22 January 2005 (aged 20)	0	(Spain) CCVM

== Pool E ==
=== Austria ===
Head coach: (Germany) Robin Rösch

2. Andor Losonci
3. Oskar Rathkolb
6. Arthur Kucera
8. Alexander Spatz
9. Florian Hagen
10. Paul Kucera
13. Benedikt Meisel
14. Julian Kaiser
20. Benjamin Kelner
22. Maximilian Meisel
28. Finley Meinecke
30. Mateusz Nyckowiak (C)
32. Lorenz Breitenecker (GK)
34. Anuga-Wehtum Munaweera
35. Vincent Scheiderbauer
36. Adrian Fink
37. Jakob Bauer
38. Erik Lang (GK)
42. Fabian Beckering

=== England ===
The squad was announced on 24 October 2025.

Head coach: Jon Bleby

No.	Pos.	Player	Date of birth (age)	Caps	Club
2		Oliver Rundle	12 April 2005 (aged 20)	0	(England) University of Nottingham
3		Nathan Gladman	15 January 2005 (aged 20)	17	(England) Exeter University
4		Ollly Bennett	5 December 2007 (aged 18)	5	(England) Oxted HC/Whitgift School
5		Kaden Draysey	27 December 2006 (aged 19)	12	(England) Exeter University
6		Tom Spreckley	21 April 2005 (aged 20)	26	(England) Loughborough Students
7		Alex Chihota	1 March 2004 (aged 21)	32	(England) Holcombe HC
8		Michael Royden	8 August 2005 (aged 20)	12	(England) Holcombe HC
9		Harrison Stone	27 May 2005 (aged 20)	32	(Germany) Münchner SC
10		Max Anderson (Captain)	23 April 2004 (aged 21)	32	(England) Surbiton HC
12		Monty Neave	22 October 2005 (aged 20)	21	(England) Loughborough Students
13		George Fletcher	21 October 2004 (aged 21)	0	(England) Beeston HC
15		Jonny Sturch-Hibbitt	22 January 2005 (aged 20)	16	(England) Exeter University
16		Jack Stamp	14 July 2007 (aged 18)	6	(England) University of Birmingham
17		Matthew Hughson	31 December 2004 (aged 21)	31	(England) Durham University
18		Ted Graves	26 November 2004 (aged 21)	22	(England) Hampstead & Westminster HC
19		Henry Markham	21 October 2004 (aged 21)	26	(England) Exeter University
21		Cole Pidcock	12 March 2004 (aged 21)	12	(England) Bowdon HC
22		Caspar Lea	25 February 2006 (aged 19)	12	(England) University of Birmingham
23	GK	Rory Mylroi	23 April 2006 (aged 19)	0	(England) Sevenoaks HC
26	GK	James Carleton	18 January 2005 (aged 20)	22	(England) Exeter University

=== Netherlands ===
The squad was announced on 11 November 2025.

Head coach: Jesse Mahieu

1. Nieki Verbeek (GK)
2. Olivier Paalman (GK)
5. Peppe Veen
6. Tjeerd Boermans
7. Danilo Trieling
8. Thies Bakker
9. Finn van Bijnen
10. Gijs ter Braak
11. Merijn Maas
12. Jens de Vuijst
13. Joppe Wolbert
14. Jan van 't Land
15. Teun Hogenhout
16. Pepijn van der Valk
17. Tim Knapper
18. Pepijn Jones
19. Lucas Corstens
21. Kjell Plantenga
22. Casper van der Veen (C)
25. Casper Hafkamp

== Pool F ==
=== Australia ===
The squad was announced on 11 November 2025.

Head coach: Jay Stacy

No.	Pos.	Player	Date of birth (age)	Caps	Club
3	FW	Patrick Andrew	3 March 2005 (aged 20)	14	
4		Tom Campbell	2 December 2005 (aged 20)	9	
5	FW	Daykin Stanger	20 March 2005 (aged 20)	15	
6	FW	Oscar Sproule	17 October 2006 (aged 19)	6	
7	MF	Lachlan Rogers	24 August 2004 (aged 21)	17	
8	MF	Toby Mallon	20 July 2005 (aged 20)	30	
9	DF	Ian Grobbelaar	22 April 2005 (aged 20)	15	
10	FW	Duncan Jackson	2 July 2006 (aged 19)	6	
12	DF	Dylan Brick	4 October 2004 (aged 21)	9	
13	DF	Dylan Downey	26 January 2005 (aged 20)	26	
16	FW	Kade Leigh	25 June 2005 (aged 20)	6	
18	DF	Noah Fahy	11 August 2004 (aged 21)	12	
20	DF	Oliver Stebbings	1 June 2006 (aged 19)	15	
21	MF	Matthew Hawthorne	14 March 2006 (aged 19)	9	
22	MF	Lucas Toonen	30 August 2005 (aged 20)	15	
23	MF	Oliver Will	4 July 2005 (aged 20)	9	
24		Oscar Pritchard	10 April 2005 (aged 20)	3	
25	GK	Matthew Edwards	26 June 2004 (aged 21)	4	
27	GK	Magnus McCausland	24 September 2004 (aged 21)	14	
28	DF	Jack Pritchard	11 July 2005 (aged 20)	0	
