= 2025 Men's Hockey One =

Hockey Australia's national league, fifth season

Tournament details
- Host country: Australia
- Dates: 10 October – 30 November
- Teams: 7
- Venue: 9 (in 9 host cities)

Final positions
- Champions: (Victoria (state)) HC Melbourne (2nd title)
- Runner-up: (Tasmania) Tassie Tigers
- Third place: (New South Wales) NSW Pride

Tournament statistics
- Matches played: 24
- Goals scored: 192 (8 per match)
- Top scorer: (Queensland) Joel Rintala (20 goals)
- Best player: (Victoria (state)) Nathan Ephraums

The 2025 Men's Hockey One is the fifth season of Hockey Australia's national league, Hockey One. The tournament is being held across seven states and territories of Australia. The competition commenced on 10 October and will culminate with the finals weekend on 29–30 November at the State Netball and Hockey Centre in Melbourne.

== Competition format ==
=== Format ===
The 2025 Hockey One season followed the same format as the previous seasons of the league. Teams will play a series of home and away matches during the Pool Stage, which will be followed by a Classification Round.

During the pool stage, teams played each other once in either a home or a way fixture. The top four ranked teams qualified for the medal round, playing in two semi-finals with the winners contesting the final and losers the third place match.

=== Rules ===
In addition to FIH sanctioned rules, Hockey Australia is implementing the following rules for Hockey One:

- When a field goal or penalty stroke is scored the same athlete will have an automatic one-on-one shootout with the goalkeeper for an extra goal.
- Outright winner: There will be no drawn games. In the event of a draw, teams will contest a penalty shoot-out to determine a winner.

=== Point allocation ===
Match points will be distributed as follows:

- 5 points: win
- 3 points: shoot-out win
- 2 points: shoot-out loss
- 0 points: loss

== Participating teams ==
The seven teams competing in the league come from Australia's states and territories, with the Northern Territory being the only team absent.

(South Australia) Adelaide Fire

Head Coach: Jethro Eustice

1. Lucas Toonen
2. Lachlan Busiko
3. Brayden King
4. Benjamin O'Grady
5. Trent Symss
6. Calvin Farmilo
7. Richard Pautz
8. Connor Richmond-Spouse (C)
9. Bryce Hammond
10. Lachlan Arniel
11. Hugh Snowden
12. Mitchell Dell
13. Rhun Williams
14. James Mitton
16. Tylo Remke
19. Sebastian Foster
20. William Johnson (GK)
21. Jethro Eustice
22. Tarrant Haami-Jones
23. Hassan Singh
25. Landon Morley
30. Evan Staker (GK)
32. Jeremy Hayward
33. Lucas Noel
42. Leon Hayward (GK)
(Queensland) Brisbane Blaze

Head Coach: Darren Fowler

1. Lachlan Sharp
3. Corey Weyer
4. Noah Fahy
6. Kyle Jeffrey-Prestwich
8. Adam Imer
9. Jacob Anderson
10. Daykin Stanger
11. Michael Francis
12. Jacob Whetton
13. David Hubbard
14. Joseph Sandor
15. Jayden Atkinson
16. Timothy Howard (C)
17. Scott Boyde
18. Ryan Wilcox
19. Luke Randle
20. Thomas Campbell
21. Matthew Hawthorne
22. Matthew Finn (GK)
24. Diarmid Chappell
25. Hayden Pease
26. Elijah Mathewson
27. Joel Rintala
28. Thomas Wycherley
32. Mitchell Nicholson (GK)
Canberra Chill

Head Coach: Seyi Onitiri

1. Koji Yamasaki
2. Benjamin Staines
3. Anand Gupte
4. James Day
5. Jesse Absolom
7. Thomas Craig
9. Jamie Hawke
10. Peter Crossman
11. Charlie Dorman
12. Jake Staines
13. Dylan Brick
14. Aidan Smith
15. Hayden Dillon (C)
16. Oscar Smart
17. Aiden Dooley
18. Kaito Tanaka
19. Hamish Morrison
21. Mathew Neeson
22. Darcy MacDonald
23. Jay MacDonald
24. Davis Atkin
26. James Jewel
27. Max Robson (GK)
30. Michael Dillon
32. Brendan Hill (GK)
(Victoria (state)) HC Melbourne

Head Coach: Jesse Workman

1. Craig Marais
2. Peter Scott
3. Jonathan Bretherton
4. Liam Henderson
5. Douglas Buckley
6. Benjamin White
7. Nathan Ephraums (C)
8. Kade Leigh
9. Oliver Will
10. Bradley Marais
11. Cooper Burns
12. Connar Otterbach
13. Daniel Smits
14. Joshua Henderson
15. Joshua Simmonds
16. Ky Willott
17. Kiran Arunasalam
18. Jed Snowden (GK)
19. Frazer Gerrard
20. Nye Roberts
21. Carlin Walker
22. Johan Durst (GK)
26. Eden Davis
27. Kaelan Boundy
29. Nicholas Fitzgerald
(New South Wales) NSW Pride

Head Coach: Kieran Govers

1. Ryan Proctor
4. Angus Callinan
5. Ashleigh Thomas (GK)
6. Bayden Smith
7. Daine Richards
8. Nathanael Stewart
9. Jack Marshall
10. Kurt Lovett
11. Dylan Downey
12. Jared Findlay
13. Blake Govers
14. Dylan Martin
16. Brayden Sutherland
18. Toby Mallon
19. Jack Hayes (C)
21. Luke Noblett
22. Connor Tuddenham
23. Ryan Woolnough
24. Lukas Overhoff
25. Nathan Czinner
27. Albert Beltrán
29. Timothy Brand
34. Thomas Miotto
36. Michael Taylor
63. Dylan Simmons (GK)
(Western Australia) Perth Thundersticks

Head Coach: Stephen Davies

1. Samuel Ashton
2. Luke Anderson
3. Hamish Adamson
4. Jake Harvie (C)
5. Angus Adamson
6. Kye Stirrat
7. Zach Rakkas
8. Zed Kearnan
9. Patrick Andrew
10. Max Freedman
11. Thomas Harvie
12. Marshall Puzey
14. Chaz Davies
15. Liam Flynn
16. Brodee Foster
17. Ethan Boucher
18. Christian Starkie (GK)
19. Ian Grobbelaar
20. James Cunningham
21. Matthew van Selm
23. Jeremy Mayne
24. Cambell Geddes
26. James Collins
27. Hunter Banyard (GK)
43. Harrison Golding
(Tasmania) Tassie Tigers

Head Coach: Benjamin Read

1. Magnus McCausland (GK)
2. Harvey Bessell
3. Tyson Johnson
4. Hayden Beltz
5. Matthew Bird
6. Joshua Brooks
7. Ruben Hoey
8. Evan Kimber
9. Jeremy Edwards
10. Oliver Stebbings
11. Edward Ockenden (C)
13. Joshua Beltz
14. Jack Welch
15. Oscar Pritchard
16. Alexander Hogan-Jones
17. Lachlan Rogers
19. Timothy Deavin
20. Ehren Hazell
22. Samuel McCulloch
24. Matthew Swann
25. Max Larkin (GK)
26. Oliver Smith
27. William Sproule
28. Oscar Sproule
77. Keenan Johnson
98. Grant Woodcock (GK)

== Venues ==
Melbourne	Perth	Adelaide
State Netball and Hockey Centre	Perth Hockey Stadium	State Hockey Centre
Capacity: 8,000	Capacity: 6,000	Capacity: 4,000
Brisbane	2025 Men's Hockey One is located in Australia	
Queensland Hockey Centre	2025 Men's Hockey One is located in Australia	
Capacity: 1,000	2025 Men's Hockey One is located in Australia	
Canberra	2025 Men's Hockey One is located in Australia	
National Hockey Centre	2025 Men's Hockey One is located in Australia	
Goulburn	2025 Men's Hockey One is located in Australia	
Goulburn Hockey Complex	2025 Men's Hockey One is located in Australia	
Hobart	Narellan	Newcastle
Tasmanian Hockey Centre	Macarthur Regional Hockey Complex	Newcastle International Hockey Centre

== Results ==
All times are local.

=== Preliminary round ===
==== Standings ====
Pos	Team	Pld	W	WD	LD	L	GF	GA	GD	Pts	Qualification
1	(Queensland) Brisbane Blaze	6	4	0	2	0	30	9	+21	24	Semi-finals
2	(New South Wales) NSW Pride	6	4	1	0	1	23	16	+7	23	Semi-finals
3	(Victoria (state)) HC Melbourne	6	4	0	0	2	32	15	+17	20	Semi-finals
4	(Tasmania) Tassie Tigers	5	3	1	0	1	22	13	+9	20	Semi-finals
5	Canberra Chill	5	2	0	0	3	31	22	+9	12	
6	(Western Australia) Perth Thundersticks	6	1	0	0	5	8	25	−17	5	
7	(South Australia) Adelaide Fire	6	0	0	0	6	4	50	−46	0	

Source: Hockey Australia
Rules for classification: 1) points; 2) matches won; 3) goal difference; 4) goals for; 5) head-to-head result; 6) field goals scored.

==== Fixtures ====
10 October 2025
18:30 (AEST)

Brisbane Blaze (Queensland)	3–1	(Western Australia) Perth Thundersticks
Wycherley 2'; Rintala 3', 6'	Report	J. Harvie 47'

Queensland Hockey Centre, Brisbane
Umpires:
Aaron Gotting (AUS)
Aleisha Neumann (AUS)

11 October 2025
15:45 (AEDT)

Canberra Chill	4–5	(New South Wales) NSW Pride
Jewel 21', 45'; Atkin 50', 50'	Report	Govers 7', 19'; Beltrán 41', 41'; Callinan 48'

National Hockey Centre, Canberra
Umpires:
Timothy Sheahan (AUS)
Cassidy Gallagher (AUS)

12 October 2025
16:15 (AEDT)

Tassie Tigers (Tasmania)	2–5	(Victoria (state)) HC Melbourne
Welch 25', 25'	Report	Ephraums 34'; Roberts 38', 38'; Smits 45'; Walker 54'

Tasmanian Hockey Centre, Hobart
Umpires:
Jayden Pearson (AUS)
Aaron Kitchener (AUS)

17 October 2025
20:15 (AEDT)

HC Melbourne (Victoria (state))	13–1	(South Australia) Adelaide Fire
Smits 8', 28', 28', 44', 44'; Ephraums 28'; Burns 33', 42', 58'; Walker 40', 40', 60'; White 47'	Report	Dell 47'

State Netball and Hockey Centre, Melbourne
Umpires:
James Unkles (AUS)
Timothy Sheahan (AUS)

18 October 2025
14:30 (AEDT)

NSW Pride (New South Wales)	4–6	(Tasmania) Tassie Tigers
Martin 19'; Govers 30', 30', 49'	Report	Welch 30', 47', 53', 60', 60'; Hazell 55'

Macarthur Regional Hockey Complex, Narellan
Umpires:
Zeke Newman (AUS)
Gilbert Gough-Fuller (AUS)

19 October 2025
14:30 (AWST)

Perth Thundersticks (Western Australia)	0–8	Canberra Chill
	Report	Dooley 11', 11'; Atkin 25', 25'; J. Staines 50', 53', 53'; Day 59'

Perth Hockey Stadium, Perth
Umpires:
Daniel Johnston (AUS)
Jordan Moore (AUS)

24 October 2025
20:15 (AEDT)

NSW Pride (New South Wales)	4–2	(Victoria (state)) HC Melbourne
Govers 10', 44', 44'; Findley 25'	Report	Burns 35', 35'

Newcastle International Hockey Centre, Newcastle
Umpires:
Zeke Newman (AUS)
Gilbert Gough-Fuller (AUS)

25 October 2025
17:45 (ACDT)

Adelaide Fire (South Australia)	1–4	(Western Australia) Perth Thundersticks
Morley 45'	Report	Grobbelaar 1'; Anderson 10'; Foster 35', 35'

State Hockey Centre, Adelaide
Umpires:
Timothy Sheahan (AUS)
Oliver Chauhan (AUS)

26 October 2025
13:30 (AEDT)

Canberra Chill	3–7	(Queensland) Brisbane Blaze
J. Staines 53'; B. Staines 55'; Dooley 55'	Report	Boyde 1', 46', 46'; Rintala 24', 32'; Imer 25', 25'

National Hockey Centre, Canberra
Umpires:
James Unkles (AUS)
Zeke Newman (AUS)

31 October 2025
20:15 (AEST)

Brisbane Blaze (Queensland)	2–2	(New South Wales) NSW Pride
Rintala 46'; Stanger 50'	Report	Czinner 60', 60'
Penalties
Hawthorne (penalty shoot-out scored); Stanger (penalty shoot-out missed); Boyde (penalty shoot-out scored); Boyde (penalty shoot-out scored); Whetton (penalty shoot-out scored)	4–5	(penalty shoot-out scored) Hayes; (penalty shoot-out scored) Czinner; (penalty shoot-out scored) Govers; (penalty shoot-out scored) Tuddenham; (penalty shoot-out scored) Beltrán

Queensland Hockey Centre, Brisbane
Umpires:
Aaron Gotting (AUS)
Aleisha Neumann (AUS)

1 November 2025
14:30 (AEDT)

Tassie Tigers (Tasmania)	3–0	(South Australia) Adelaide Fire
Hazell 3', 4', 8'	Report

Tasmanian Hockey Centre, Hobart
Umpires:
Jayden Pearson (AUS)
Aaron Kitchener (AUS)

2 November 2025
16:15 (AWST)

Perth Thundersticks (Western Australia)	1–3	(Victoria (state)) HC Melbourne
Grobbelaar 44'	Report	Smits 22'; Burns 49', 49'

Perth Hockey Stadium, Perth
Umpires:
James Unkles (AUS)
Daniel Johnston (AUS)

7 November 2025
18:30 (AEDT)

HC Melbourne (Victoria (state))	0–6	(Queensland) Brisbane Blaze
	Report	Boyde 3'; Atkinson 9', 9'; Hawthorne 13', 13'; Rintala 45'

State Netball and Hockey Centre, Melbourne
Umpires:
Oliver Chauhan (AUS)
Timothy Sheahan (AUS)

8 November 2025
14:30 (AEDT)

Tassie Tigers (Tasmania)	8–1	(Western Australia) Perth Thundersticks
Hazell 13', 13', 20'; Deavin 13', 13'; Rogers 20'; Ockenden 37'; H. Beltz 48'	Report	T. Harvie 8'

Tasmanian Hockey Centre, Hobart
Umpires:
Jayden Pearson (AUS)
Aaron Kitchener (AUS)

9 November 2025
14:45 (ACDT)

Adelaide Fire (South Australia)	1–15	Canberra Chill
Singh 16'	Report	Brick 17', 31', 50'; J. Staines 18'; Dooley 21', 21'; Yamasaki 26', 47', 47', 56'; B. Staines 32', 45'; Day 54'; Craig 59', 59'

State Hockey Centre, Adelaide
Umpires:
Jordan Moore (AUS)
Daniel Johnston (AUS)

14 November 2025
18:30 (ACDT)

NSW Pride (New South Wales)	6–1	(South Australia) Adelaide Fire
Govers 9', 9', 22', 53'; Findley 22'; Czinner 35'	Report	J. Hayward 57'

Goulburn Hockey Complex, Goulburn
Umpires:
Gilbert Gough-Fuller (AUS)
Kristy Robertson (AUS)

15 November 2025
20:15 (AEDT)

HC Melbourne (Victoria (state))	9–1	Canberra Chill
Smits 14', 35'; Ephraums 18', 32', 53', 53'; C. Marais 35', 35'; Will 37'	Report	Dillon 3'

State Netball and Hockey Centre, Melbourne
Umpires:
James Unkles (AUS)
Timothy Sheahan (AUS)

16 November 2025
15:45 (AEST)

Brisbane Blaze (Queensland)	3–3	(Tasmania) Tassie Tigers
Sharp 33'; Weyer 56', 56'	Report	Ockenden 20'; Sproule 49', 49'
Penalties
Hawthorne (penalty shoot-out scored); Weyer (penalty shoot-out missed); Boyde (penalty shoot-out scored); Rintala (penalty shoot-out missed); Whetton (penalty shoot-out scored)	2–3	(penalty shoot-out scored) Welch; (penalty shoot-out missed) Hazell; (penalty shoot-out scored) Rogers; (penalty shoot-out missed) Sproule; (penalty shoot-out scored) Stebbings

Queensland Hockey Centre, Brisbane
Umpires:
Aaron Gotting (AUS)
Tamara Wood (AUS)

21 November 2025
20:15 (AEDT)

Canberra Chill	Cancelled	(Tasmania) Tassie Tigers
	Report; Both teams awarded 2 points.

National Hockey Centre, Canberra

22 November 2025
17:45 (ACDT)

Adelaide Fire (South Australia)	0–9	(Queensland) Brisbane Blaze
	Report	Rintala 2', 17', 19', 25', 26', 26'; Sharp 16'; Anderson 20'; Sandor 29'

State Hockey Centre, Adelaide
Umpires:
James Unkles (AUS)
Oliver Chauhan (AUS)

23 November 2025
14:30 (AWST)

Perth Thundersticks (Western Australia)	1–2	(New South Wales) NSW Pride
Foster 45'	Report	Govers 23', 24'

Perth Hockey Stadium, Perth
Umpires:
Jordan Moore (AUS)
Daniel Johnston (AUS)

=== Medal round ===
==== Bracket ====
Semi-finals
29 November
(Queensland) Brisbane Blaze	6 (1)
(Tasmania) Tassie Tigers (pen.)	6 (2)
29 November
(New South Wales) NSW Pride	3
(Victoria (state)) HC Melbourne	9

Final
30 November
(Tasmania) Tassie Tigers	1
(Victoria (state)) HC Melbourne	3
Third place
30 November
(Queensland) Brisbane Blaze	4
(New South Wales) NSW Pride	10

==== Semi-finals ====
29 November 2025
12:30

Brisbane Blaze (Queensland)	6–6	(Tasmania) Tassie Tigers
Rintala 12', 31', 31', 56'; Mathewson 28'; Pease 37'	Report	McCulloch 2', 41', 41'; T. Johnson 24'; K. Johnson 35'; Brooks 54'
Penalties
Sharp (penalty shoot-out missed); Boyde (penalty shoot-out missed); Rintala (penalty shoot-out scored); Atkinson (penalty shoot-out missed); Whetton (penalty shoot-out missed)	1–2	(penalty shoot-out scored) Welch; (penalty shoot-out missed) Hazell; (penalty shoot-out missed) McCulloch; (penalty shoot-out scored) Hoey; (penalty shoot-out missed) K. Johnson

State Netball and Hockey Centre, Melbourne
Umpires:
James Unlkes (AUS)
Daniel Johnston (AUS)

29 November 2025
16:00

NSW Pride (New South Wales)	3–9	(Victoria (state)) HC Melbourne
Govers 48'; Martin 50', 50'	Report	Ephraums 3'; White 17', 17'; Smits 29', 29'; Willott 33', 53'; Scott 52'; Burns 53'

State Netball and Hockey Centre, Melbourne
Umpires:
Zeke Newman (AUS)
Aleisha Neumann (AUS)

==== Third and fourth place ====
30 November 2025
13:00

Brisbane Blaze (Queensland)	4–10	(New South Wales) NSW Pride
Rintala 15', 29', 59', 59'	Report	Lovett 3', 3', 34', 34'; Callinan 30', 30'; Taylor 52'; Govers 54'; Beltrán 59', 59'

State Netball and Hockey Centre, Melbourne
Umpires:
James Unkles (AUS)
Daniel Johnston (AUS)

==== Final ====
30 November 2025
17:30

Tassie Tigers (Tasmania)	1–3	(Victoria (state)) HC Melbourne
McCulloch 15+'	Report	Willott 17', 17'; Ephraums 44'

State Netball and Hockey Centre, Melbourne
Umpires:
Zeke Newman (AUS)
Aleisha Neumann (AUS)

== Goalscorers ==
There were 192 goals scored in 24 matches, for an average of 8 goals per match.

20 goals

- (Queensland) Joel Rintala

16 goals

- (New South Wales) Blake Govers

11 goals

- (Victoria (state)) Daniel Smits

8 goals

- (Victoria (state)) Cooper Burns
- (Victoria (state)) Nathan Ephraums

7 goals

- (Tasmania) Ehren Hazell
- (Tasmania) Jack Welch

5 goals

- (Australian Capital Territory) Aiden Dooley
- (Australian Capital Territory) Jake Staines

4 goals

- (Queensland) Scott Boyde
- (Australian Capital Territory) Davis Atkin
- (Australian Capital Territory) Koji Yamasaki
- (Victoria (state)) Carlin Walker
- (Victoria (state)) Ky Willott
- (New South Wales) Albert Beltrán
- (New South Wales) Kurt Lovett
- (Tasmania) Samuel McCulloch

3 goals

- (Australian Capital Territory) Dylan Brick
- (Australian Capital Territory) Benjamin Staines
- (Victoria (state)) Benjamin White
- (New South Wales) Angus Callinan
- (New South Wales) Nathan Czinner
- (New South Wales) Dylan Martin
- (Western Australia) Brodee Foster

2 goals

- (Queensland) Jayden Atkinson
- (Queensland) Matthew Hawthorne
- (Queensland) Adam Imer
- (Queensland) Lachlan Sharp
- (Queensland) Corey Weyer
- (Australian Capital Territory) Thomas Craig
- (Australian Capital Territory) James Day
- (Australian Capital Territory) James Jewell
- (Victoria (state)) Craig Marais
- (Victoria (state)) Nye Roberts
- (New South Wales) Jared Findley
- (Western Australia) Ian Grobbelaar
- (Tasmania) Timothy Deavin
- (Tasmania) Edward Ockenden
- (Tasmania) Oscar Sproule

1 goal

- (South Australia) Mitchell Dell
- (South Australia) Jeremy Hayward
- (South Australia) Landon Morley
- (South Australia) Hassan Singh
- (Queensland) Jacob Anderson
- (Queensland) Elijah Mathewson
- (Queensland) Hayden Pease
- (Queensland) Joseph Sandor
- (Queensland) Daykin Stanger
- (Queensland) Thomas Wycherley
- (Australian Capital Territory) Hayden Dillon
- (Victoria (state)) Peter Scott
- (Victoria (state)) Oliver Will
- (New South Wales) Michael Taylor
- (Western Australia) Luke Anderson
- (Western Australia) Jake Harvie
- (Western Australia) Thomas Harvie
- (Tasmania) Hayden Beltz
- (Tasmania) Joshua Brooks
- (Tasmania) Keenan Johnson
- (Tasmania) Tyson Johnson
- (Tasmania) Lachlan Rogers

Source: Hockey Australia
