= Oliver Stebbings =

Australian field hockey player (born 2006)

Personal information
- Born: 1 June 2006 (age 20) Launceston, Australia

Sport
- Sport: Field hockey
- Position: Defence
Senior career
Years	Team	Caps	Goals
2023–	NWG Bulldogs	-	-
2024–	Tassie Tigers	9	2
National team
Years	Team	Caps	Goals
2024–	Australia U–21	24	(0)
Medal record
Representing Australia
Men's field hockey
Junior Oceania Cup
Gold medal – first place	2025 Auckland
Gold medal – first place	2026 Redcliffe
Sultan of Johor Cup
Gold medal – first place	2025 Johor Bahru
Silver medal – second place	2024 Johor Bahru

Oliver Stebbings (born 1 June 2006) is an international field hockey player from Australia.

He was named in Hockey Australia's inaugural Talent Accelerator 2032, recognising her as one of the most promising junior players with a dedicated pathway to lead into the XXXV Summer Olympics in Brisbane.

He competes in Hockey Australia's premier domestic competition, the ONE Active Hockey One.

== Personal life ==
Stebbings was born and raised in Launceston, Tasmania.

== Australian leagues ==
Stebbings currently competes in Hockey Tasmania's Premier League competition for the North West Hobart Graduates HC. He has been a member of the men's squad since 2023 when he made the move from Launceston to Hobart.

In 2024 he made his debut for the Tassie Tigers during season four of the ONE Active Hockey One.

== National team ==
=== Under–21 ===
He made his debut for the Australian U–21 side, the Burras, in 2024.

In 2025 he was a member of the gold medal-winning squads at the Junior Oceania Cup in Auckland and the Sultan of Johor Cup in Johor Bahru. He also represented the side at the FIH Junior World Cup in Chennai and Madurai, finishing in eleventh place.

In 2026 he won a gold medal at his second Junior Oceania Cup in Redcliffe.

== Career statistics ==
Appearances and goals by club, season and competition
Club	Season	League			Total	
Club	Season	Division	Apps	Goals	Apps	Goals
Tassie Tigers	2024	ONE Active Hockey One	4	0	4	0
Tassie Tigers	2025	ONE Active Hockey One	2	0	2	0
Tassie Tigers	2026	ONE Active Hockey One	3	2	3	2
Tassie Tigers	Total		9	2	9	2
Career total			9	2	9	2
