= 2025 Men's Junior Oceania Cup =

Field hockey tournament

Tournament details
- Host country: New Zealand
- City: Auckland
- Dates: 30 January – 2 February 2025
- Teams: 2 (from 1 confederation)
- Venue: Lloyd Elsmore Park

Final positions
- Champions: Australia (6th title)
- Runner-up: New Zealand

Tournament statistics
- Matches played: 3
- Goals scored: 12 (4 per match)
- Top scorer(s): (Australia) Ian Grobbelaar (New Zealand) Sam Lints (2 goals)

The 2025 Men's Junior Oceania Cup was the sixth edition of the Junior Oceania Cup for men. The event was held at Lloyd Elsmore Park in Auckland, New Zealand from 30 January to 2 February 2025.

The tournament served as the Oceania qualifier for the 2025 FIH Junior World Cup to be held in India. As the Oceania Hockey Federation receives three qualification quotas, the top three placed nations gained qualification to the FIH Junior World Cup.

Australia won the tournament for the sixth consecutive time. They defeated New Zealand 3–2 in penalties after both teams were level on all tiebreakers at the conclusion of the test matches.

== Participating nations ==
The following national associations participated in the tournament.

Australia

Head Coach: Jay Stacy

3. Lucas Toonen
5. Daykin Stanger
7. Lachlan Rogers
8. Toby Mallon (C)
9. Ian Grobbelaar
12. Dylan Brick
13. Dylan Downey
15. Samuel Lowndes
16. Kade Leigh
17. Jared Findley
18. Noah Fahy
19. Darcy MacDonald
20. Oliver Stebbings
21. Matthew Hawthorne
22. Patrick Andrew
23. Oliver Will
25. Matthew Edwards (GK)
27. Magnus McCausland (GK)
New Zealand

Head Coach: Michael Delaney

1. Aiden Bax
2. Owen Brown
3. Luka Clark
4. Dean Clarkson
5. Timothy Crawford
6. Javahn Jones
7. Jakata Klebert
8. Sam Lints (C)
9. Rocco Ludolph
10. Kalarn Mason
11. Finlay Neale
12. Gus Nelson
13. Hugh Nixon (GK)
14. Ryan Parr
15. Milan Patel
16. Matthew Reutsch (GK)
17. Bradley Rothwell
18. Jordan Whittleson
Papua New Guinea
Solomon Islands

== Results ==
=== Standings ===
| Pos | Team | Pld | W | D | L | GF | GA | GD | Pts | Qualification |
|---|---|---|---|---|---|---|---|---|---|---|
| 1 | Australia (C) | 3 | 1 | 1 | 1 | 6 | 6 | 0 | 4 | 2025 Junior World Cup |
| 2 | New Zealand (H) | 3 | 1 | 1 | 1 | 6 | 6 | 0 | 4 | 2025 Junior World Cup |
| 3 | Papua New Guinea (Note: Papua New Guinea and Solomon Islands withdrew before the start of the tournament.) | 0 | 0 | 0 | 0 | 0 | 0 | 0 | 0 | Withdrawn |
| 4 | Solomon Islands | 0 | 0 | 0 | 0 | 0 | 0 | 0 | 0 | Withdrawn |

Source: FIH
Rules for classification: 1) points; 2) goal difference; 3) goals scored; 4) head-to-head result.
(C) Champions; (H) Hosts

==== Fixtures ====
30 January 2025
18:00

| New Zealand | 4–3 | Australia |
|---|---|---|
| Lints 24', 41'; Brown 31'; Ludolph 42' | Report | Grobbelaar 10'; Hawthorne 13'; Pritchard 38' |

Umpires:
Timothy Sheahan (AUS)
Nicholas Saunders (NZL)

1 February 2025
14:00

| Australia | 1–0 | New Zealand |
|---|---|---|
| Brick 60' | Report |

Umpires:
Nicholas Saunders (NZL)
Timothy Sheahan (AUS)

2 February 2025
14:00

| New Zealand | 2–2 | Australia |
|---|---|---|
| Jones 56'; Klebert 58' | Report | Grobbelaar 7'; Stanger 59' |
Penalties
| Lints (penalty shoot-out missed); Neale (penalty shoot-out missed); Ludolph (penalty shoot-out scored); Clark (penalty shoot-out scored); Jones (penalty shoot-out missed) | 2–3 | (penalty shoot-out missed) Mallon; (penalty shoot-out scored) Stanger; (penalty shoot-out missed) Downey; (penalty shoot-out scored) Stebbings; (penalty shoot-out scored) Hawthorne |

Umpires:
Timothy Sheahan (AUS)
Nicholas Saunders (NZL)

== Goalscorers ==
There were 12 goals scored in 3 matches, for an average of 4 goals per match.

2 goals

- (Australia) Ian Grobbelaar
- (New Zealand) Sam Lints

1 goal

- (Australia) Dylan Brick
- (Australia) Matthew Hawthorne
- (Australia) Oscar Pritchard
- (Australia) Daykin Stanger
- (New Zealand) Owen Brown
- (New Zealand) Javahn Jones
- (New Zealand) Jakarta Klebert
- (New Zealand) Rocco Ludolph

Source: FIH
