= 2025 Sultan of Johor Cup =

Men's U21 field hockey tournament in Malaysia

Tournament details
- Host country: Malaysia
- City: Johor Bahru
- Dates: 11 October – 18 October
- Teams: 6 (from 3 confederations)
- Venue: Taman Daya Hockey Stadium

Final positions
- Champions: Australia (3rd title)
- Runner-up: India
- Third place: Great Britain

Tournament statistics
- Matches played: 18
- Goals scored: 91 (5.06 per match)
- Top scorer: (Pakistan) Sufyan Khan (9 goals)
- Best player: (Pakistan) Hannan Shahid
- Best goalkeeper: (Australia) Magnus McCausland
All statistics are correct as of 18 October 2025


The 2025 Sultan of Johor Cup was the thirteenth edition of the Sultan of Johor Cup, an international men's under–21 field hockey tournament in Malaysia, held at the Taman Daya Hockey Stadium in Johor Bahru, Malaysia from 11 October to 18 October 2025.

== Background ==
=== Participating nations ===
Including the host nation, 6 teams are competing in the tournament.

Country	FIH Junior Ranking	Previous Best Appearance	Best FIH Junior World Cup Finish
Australia	8	Champions (2016, 2017)	Champions (1997)
Great Britain*	16	Champions (2015, 2018, 2019, 2024)	Fourth Place (1997, 2001)
India	2	Champions (2013, 2014, 2022)	Champions (2001, 2016)
Malaysia	11	Champions (2011)	Fourth Place (1979, 1982, 2013)
New Zealand	12	Fourth Place (2014)	Fourth Place (2009)
Pakistan	9	Runners-up (2016)	Champions (1979)

* = includes results representing England, Scotland and Wales

== Preliminary round ==
All times are local (UTC+8).

=== Standings ===
Pos	Team	Pld	W	D	L	GF	GA	GD	Pts	Qualification
1	Australia	5	3	2	0	14	6	+8	11	Final
2	India	5	3	1	1	14	12	+2	10	Final
3	Great Britain	5	2	1	2	13	9	+4	7	Third place game
4	Pakistan	5	1	2	2	16	16	0	5	Third place game
5	Malaysia (H)	5	1	1	3	9	16	−7	4	Fifth place game
6	New Zealand	5	1	1	3	9	16	−7	4	Fifth place game

Source: FIH
Rules for classification: 1) points; 2) matches won; 3) goal difference; 4) goals for; 5) head-to-head result; 6) field goals for.
(H) Hosts

=== Results ===
11 October 2025
16:05 UTC+08:00

India	3–2	Great Britain
Ravneet 23'; Rohit 45+', 52'	Report	Royden 26'; Draysey 46'

Umpires:
Hari Silvarajoo (SGP)
Noor Muhamad (MAS)

11 October 2025
18:15 UTC+08:00

Pakistan	7–2	Malaysia
Sufyan 3', 21', 34'; Hannan 30'; Nadeem 32', 44'; Hamza 52'	Report	Abd 20'; Kamaruddin 35'

Umpires:
Amar Chudasama (ENG)
Ryan Potter (NZL)

11 October 2025
20:35 UTC+08:00

Australia	4–0	New Zealand
Sproule 19'; Grobbelaar 35'; Will 57'; Brick 59'	Report

Umpires:
Ravdeep Sethi (HKG)
Fahad Ali Khan (PAK)

12 October 2025
16:05 UTC+08:00

India	4–2	New Zealand
Arshdeep 2'; Bennur 15'; Hundal 26'; Kujur 47'	Report	Nelson 41'; Bax 52'

Umpires:
Kugannan Segaran (MAS)
Amar Chudasama (ENG)

12 October 2025
18:15 UTC+08:00

Australia	1–1	Malaysia
Grobbelaar 47'	Report	Kamaruddin 13'

Umpires:
Ryan Potter (NZL)
Mohit Rawat (IND)

12 October 2025
20:35 UTC+08:00

Great Britain	5–1	Pakistan
Markham 4', 14'; Sturch-Hibbitt 5', 55'; Draysey 53'	Report	Sufyan 22'

Umpires:
Oliver Chauhan (AUS)
Ravdeep Sethi (HKG)

14 October 2025
16:05 UTC+08:00

Great Britain	0–2	Australia
	Report	Jackson 15'; Grobbelaar 51'

Umpires:
Fahad Ali Khan (Pakistan)
Noor Muhamad (MAS)

14 October 2025
18:15 UTC+08:00

Malaysia	4–2	New Zealand
Panicker 16', 19'; Abd 19'; Muhammad 57'	Report	Jones 44'; Ludolph 47'

Umpires:
Oliver Chauhan (AUS)
Mohit Rawat (IND)

14 October 2025
20:35 UTC+08:00

Pakistan	3–3	India
Shahid 5'; Sufyan 39', 55'	Report	Hundal 43'; Kushwaha 47'; Manmeet 53'

Umpires:
Ravdeep Sethi (HKG)
Hari Silvarajoo (SGP)

15 October 2025
16:05 UTC+08:00

New Zealand	3–2	Pakistan
Ludolph 19'; Klebert 37'; Whittleston 53'	Report	Sufyan 26', 35'

Umpires:
Kugannan Segaran (MAS)
Oliver Chauhan (AUS)

15 October 2025
18:15 UTC+08:00

Great Britain	4–1	Malaysia
Draysey 10'; Sturch-Hibbitt 19', 39'; Neave 26'	Report	Johari 17'

Umpires:
Ryan Potter (NZL)
Mohit Rawat (IND)

15 October 2025
20:35 UTC+08:00

Australia	4–2	India
Sproule 39', 42'; Andrew 40'; Downey 51'	Report	Rohit 22'; Arshdeep 60'

Umpires:
Amar Chudasama (ENG)
Hari Silvarajoo (SGP)

17 October 2025
16:05 UTC+08:00

India	2–1	Malaysia
Gurjot 22'; Kushwaha 48'	Report	Panicker 43'

Umpires:
Oliver Chauhan (AUS)
Ryan Potter (NZL)

17 October 2025
18:15 UTC+08:00

New Zealand	2–2	Great Britain
Whittleston 3', 60'	Report	Lea 16'; Anderson 19'

Umpires:
Muhamad Noor (MAS)
Fahad Ali Khan (PAK)

17 October 2025
20:35 UTC+08:00

Pakistan	3–3	Australia
Shahid 38', 48'; Saif 57'	Report	Mallon 7'; Sproule 10'; Grobbelaar 47'

Umpires:
Ravdeep Sethi (HKG)
Kugannan Segaran (MAS)

== Classification round results ==
=== Fifth and sixth place ===
18 October 2025
15:35 UTC+08:00

Malaysia	5–3	New Zealand
Osman 2'; Mohd 10'; Khairil 44'; Kamaruddin 47'; Muhammad 60'	Report	Rothwell 32'; Whittleston 56'; Clarkson 60'

Umpires:
Fahad Ali Khan (PAK)
Mohit Rawat (IND)

=== Third and fourth place ===
18 October 2025
18:15 UTC+08:00

Great Britain	3–2	Pakistan
Draysey 7'; Royden 12'; Markham 57'	Report	Shahid 23'; Sufyan 54'

Umpires:
Hari Silvarajoo (SGP)
Ravdeep Sethi (HKG)

=== Final ===
18 October 2025
20:35 UTC+08:00

Australia	2–1	India
Grobbelaar 13', 59'	Report	Ekka 17'

Umpires:
Amar Chudasama (ENG)
Muhamad Noor (MAS)

== Statistics ==
=== Final standings ===
Pos	Team
1	Australia
2	India
3	Great Britain
4	Pakistan
5	Malaysia (H)
6	New Zealand

Source: FIH
(H) Host

=== Goalscorers ===
There were 91 goals scored in 18 matches, for an average of 5.06 goals per match.

9 goals

- (Pakistan) Sufyan Khan

6 goals

- (Australia) Ian Grobbelaar

5 goals

- (Pakistan) Hannan Shahid

4 goals

- (Australia) Oscar Sproule
- (United Kingdom) Jonny Sturch-Hibbitt
- (United Kingdom) Kaden Draysey
- (New Zealand) Jordan Whittleston

3 goals

- (United Kingdom) Henry Markham
- (India) Rohit
- (Malaysia) Naaveenesh Panicker
- (Malaysia) Azimuddin Kamaruddin

2 goals

- (United Kingdom) Michael Royden
- (India) Arshdeep Singh
- (India) Araijeet Singh Hundal
- (India) Sourabh Anand Kushwaha
- (Malaysia) Ammar Abd
- (Malaysia) Muhammad Muhammad
- (New Zealand) Rocco Ludolph
- (Pakistan) Nadeem Khan

1 goal

- (Australia) Dylan Brick
- (Australia) Dylan Downey
- (Australia) Duncan Jackson
- (Australia) Patrick Andrew
- (Australia) Oliver Will
- (Australia) Toby Mallon
- (United Kingdom) Monty Neave
- (United Kingdom) Caspar Lea
- (United Kingdom) Max Anderson
- (India) Anmol Ekka
- (India) Gurjot Singh
- (India) Manmeet Singh
- (India) Sunil Palakshappa Bennur
- (India) Rosan Kujur
- (India) Ravneet Singh
- (Malaysia) Adam Johari
- (Malaysia) Harris Osman
- (Malaysia) Mohd Muhammad
- (Malaysia) Danish Khairil
- (New Zealand) Aiden Bax
- (New Zealand) Bradley Rothwell
- (New Zealand) Dean Clarkson
- (New Zealand) Gus Nelson
- (New Zealand) Jakarta Klebert
- (New Zealand) Javahn Jones
- (Pakistan) Fayyaz Hamza
- (Pakistan) Saif Ullah

Source: FIH

== See also ==
- Sultan of Johor Cup,
- List of hockey world championships
- Other hockey championships
