= Madurai International Hockey Stadium =

Stadium in Madurai, Tamil Nadu, India

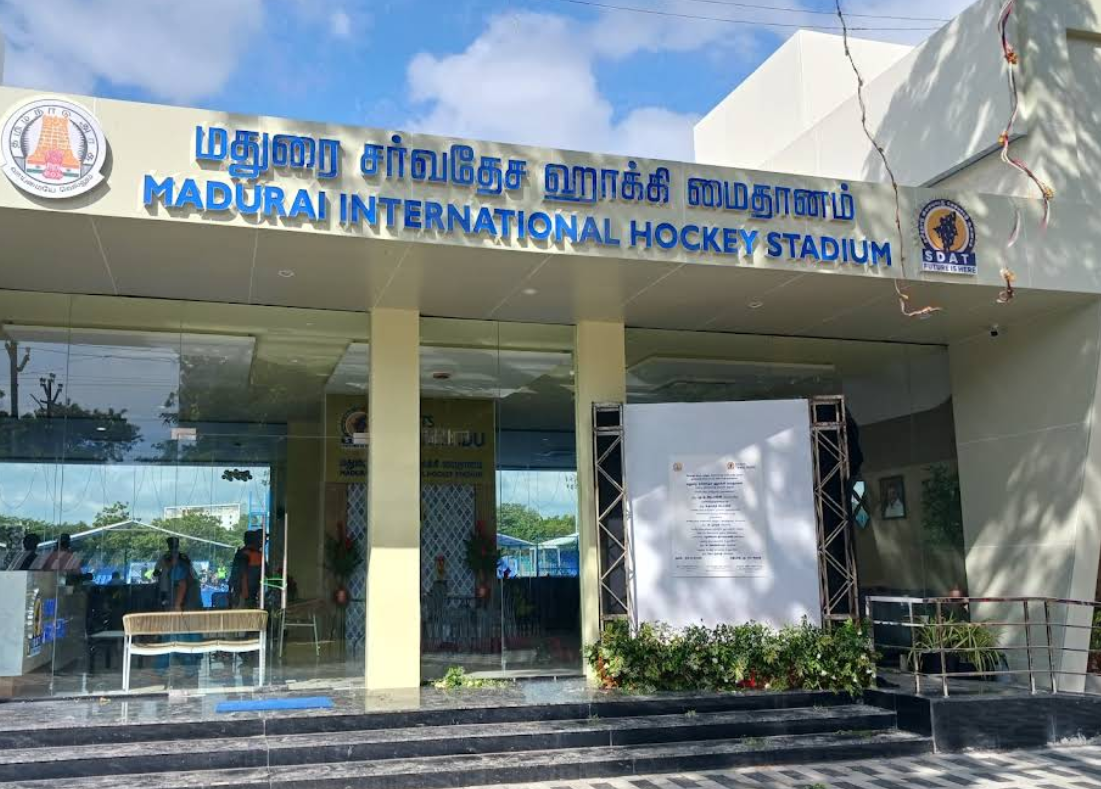
- Interactive map of Madurai International Hockey Stadium
- Location: Madurai, Tamil Nadu, India
- Coordinates: 9.94054°N 78.14328°E
- Owner: Sports Development Authority of Tamil Nadu
- Capacity: 2,000
- Surface: Artificial Turf
- Public transit: TNSTC (Madurai)

Construction
- Built: 2025
- Opened: 22 November 2025
- Cost: ₹20 crore (US$2.1 million)

Madurai International Hockey Stadium is a field hockey stadium at Madurai, Tamil Nadu, India. Inaugurated by Deputy Chief Minister Udhayanidhi Stalin on 22 November 2025. It is the venue for the 2025 Men's FIH Hockey Junior World Cup, and hosted the tournament from 28th November to 08th December 2025. It is one of the International Hockey Stadiums located in Tamil Nadu, followed by the Mayor Radhakrishnan Hockey Stadium in Chennai, Tamil Nadu.

== See also ==
- MGR Race Course Stadium
