= Gus Nelson =

New Zealand field hockey player

Personal information
- Born: 31 March 2004 (age 22) New Zealand

Sport
- Sport: Field hockey
- Position: Midfield
Senior career
| Years | Team | Caps | Goals |
| 2024– | Southern Alpiners | - | - |
National team
| Years | Team | Caps | Goals |
| 2023– | New Zealand U–21 | 24 | (4) |
| 2025– | New Zealand | 5 | (0) |
Medal record
Men's field hockey
Representing New Zealand
Oceania Cup
| Silver medal – second place | 2025 Darwin |
FIH Nations Cup
| Gold medal – first place | 2024–25 Kuala Lumpur |
Junior Oceania Cup
| Silver medal – second place | 2025 Auckland |

Gus Nelson (born 31 March 2004) is a field hockey player from New Zealand.

== Life ==
Gus Nelson grew up in the Āria community in rural Waikato, New Zealand.

== Career ==
=== Domestic league ===
In domestic competitions, Nelson plays within New Zealand. He most recently competed with the Southern Alpiners in the Premier Hockey League and Junior Hockey League, as well as Canterbury in the Ford National Hockey Championship.

=== Under–21 ===
Nelson is currently the captain of the New Zealand U–21 squad.

He represented the team for the first time at the 2023 Sultan of Johor Cup in Johor Bahru, and followed this up with an appearance at the FIH Junior World Cup in Kuala Lumpur.

Since his junior debut, he has also appeared at the 2024 and 2025 editions of the Sultan of Johor Cup, as well as the 2025 Junior Oceania Cup in Auckland, where he won a silver medal. He was most recently named in the squad for his second FIH Junior World Cup, to be held in Chennai and Madurai.

=== Black Sticks ===
Nelson made his senior international debut for the Black Sticks in 2025. He earned his first senior cap during a match against Japan during the 2024–25 FIH Nations Cup in Kuala Lumpur. He went on to win his first gold medal with the national team at the tournament. He followed this up with appearances at the 2025 Oceania Cup in Darwin. At the tournament, he won a silver medal.
