= 2026 Men's Junior Oceania Cup =

Field hockey tournament

Tournament details
- Host country: Australia
- City: Redcliffe
- Dates: 1–4 October
- Teams: 2 (from 1 confederation)
- Venue: Redcliffe Hockey Club

Final positions
- Champions: Australia (7th title)
- Runner-up: New Zealand

Tournament statistics
- Matches played: 3
- Goals scored: 16 (5.33 per match)
- Top scorer(s): (Australia) Ian Grobbelaar (Australia) Matthew Hawthorne (3 goals)

The 2026 Men's Junior Oceania Cup was the seventh edition of the field hockey Junior Oceania Cup for men. The event was held at Redcliffe Hockey Club in Redcliffe, Australia from 1–4 October 2026.

The tournament served as the Oceania qualifier for the 2027 FIH Junior World Cup. As the Oceania Hockey Federation received three qualification quotas, both participating nations gained automatic qualification.

== Results ==
=== Standings ===
Pos	Team	Pld	W	D	L	GF	GA	GD	Pts	Qualification
1	Australia (H)	3	3	0	0	12	4	+8	9	2027 Junior World Cup
2	New Zealand	3	0	0	3	4	12	−8	0	2027 Junior World Cup

Source: FIH
Rules for classification: 1) points; 2) matches won; 3) goal difference; 4) goals for; 5) head-to-head result; 6) field goals for.
(H) Hosts

==== Fixtures ====
1 October 2026
16:00

Australia	3–2	New Zealand
Laussen 8'; Hammond 24'; Hawthorne 37'	Report	Harris 13'; Caldwell 42'

Umpires:
Jayden Pearson (AUS)
Anton Paulin (NZL)

3 October 2026
14:00

New Zealand	1–5	Australia
Neale 12'	Report	Grobbelaar 14', 32'; Findley 35'; Jackson 39'; Hawthorne 42'

Umpires:
Oliver Chauhan (AUS)
Anton Paulin (NZL)

4 October 2026
16:00

Australia	4–1	New Zealand
Jackson 11'; Crossman 35'; Hawthorne 58'; Grobbelaar 60'	Report	Roberts 39'

Umpires:
Anton Paulin (NZL)
Oliver Chauhan (AUS)

== Goalscorers ==
There were 16 goals scored in 3 matches, for an average of 5.33 goals per match.

3 goals

- (Australia) Ian Grobbelaar
- (Australia) Matthew Hawthorne

2 goals

- (Australia) Duncan Jackson

1 goal

- (Australia) Peter Crossman
- (Australia) Jared Findley
- (Australia) Bryce Hammond
- (Australia) Henry Laussen
- (New Zealand) Ryan Caldwell
- (New Zealand) Quinn Harris
- (New Zealand) Finlay Neale
- (New Zealand) William Roberts

Source: FIH

== See also ==
- 2026 Women's Junior Oceania Cup
