= Matthew Hawthorne =

Australian field hockey player (born 2006)

Personal information
- Born: 14 March 2006 (age 20) Toowoomba, Australia

Sport
- Sport: Field hockey
- Position: Midfield
Senior career
| Years | Team | Caps | Goals |
| 2024– | Easts HC | 69 | 65 |
| 2025– | Brisbane Blaze | 7 | 5 |
National team
| Years | Team | Caps | Goals |
| 2025– | Australia U–21 | 18 | (6) |
Medal record
Representing Australia
Men's field hockey
Junior Oceania Cup
| Gold medal – first place | 2025 Auckland |
| Gold medal – first place | 2026 Redcliffe |
Sultan of Johor Cup
| Gold medal – first place | 2025 Johor Bahru |

Matthew Hawthorne (born 14 March 2006) is an international field hockey player from Australia.

He was named in Hockey Australia's inaugural Talent Accelerator 2032, recognising her as one of the most promising junior players with a dedicated pathway to lead into the XXXV Summer Olympics in Brisbane.

He competes in Hockey Australia's premier domestic competition, the ONE Active Hockey One.

== Personal life ==
Hawthorne was born and raised in Toowoomba, Queensland.

He is a scholarship holder at the QAS.

== Australian leagues ==
Hawthorne currently competes in Hockey Queensland's Brisbane Hockey League competition for Easts HC. He has been a member of the men's squad since 2024. During his time with Easts he has competed in three consecutive grand finals, taking home premierships in the last two.

In 2025 he made his debut for the Brisbane Blaze during season five of the ONE Active Hockey One.

== National team ==
=== Under–21 ===
He made his debut for the Australian U–21 side, the Burras, in 2025. He was a member of the gold medal-winning squads at the Junior Oceania Cup in Auckland and the Sultan of Johor Cup in Johor Bahru. He also represented the side at the FIH Junior World Cup in Chennai and Madurai, finishing in eleventh place.

In 2026 he won a gold medal at the Junior Oceania Cup in Redcliffe.

== Career statistics ==
Appearances and goals by club, season and competition
| Club | Season | League | | | Total | |
| Club | Season | Division | Apps | Goals | Apps | Goals |
|---|---|---|---|---|---|---|
| Easts HC | 2024 | Brisbane Hockey League | 34 | 22 | 34 | 22 |
| Easts HC | 2025 | Brisbane Hockey League | 18 | 20 | 18 | 20 |
| Easts HC | 2026 | Brisbane Hockey League | 17 | 23 | 17 | 23 |
| Easts HC | Total | | 69 | 65 | 69 | 65 |
| Brisbane Blaze | 2025 | ONE Active Hockey One | 4 | 2 | 4 | 2 |
| Brisbane Blaze | 2026 | ONE Active Hockey One | 3 | 3 | 3 | 3 |
| Brisbane Blaze | Total | | 7 | 5 | 7 | 5 |
| Career total | | | 76 | 70 | 76 | 70 |
