= MGR Race Course Stadium =

Multi-purpose stadium in Madurai, India

MGR Stadium
- The Race Course Stadium
- Interactive map of MGR Stadium
- Full name: MGR Stadium
- Location: Madurai, Tamil Nadu, India
- Coordinates: 9.94054°N 78.14328°E
- Owner: Sport Development Authority of Tamil Nadu
- Capacity: 10,000
- Surface: Polyurethane

Construction
- Opened: 1970
- Renovated: 2004, 2012

The MGR Race Course Stadium (also known as the MGR Stadium) is a multi-purpose stadium in Madurai, India. It hosts several sporting events, including national and international kabaddi championships. It has a seating capacity of 10,000 and features a 400m synthetic athletic track. Constructed in 1970 in an area of 26 acres (11 ha), the stadium is the main sports venue of Madurai that has facilities to host over 12 sport disciplines.

== History ==
It was established by the Sports Development Authority of Tamil Nadu in 1970. It is one of the main sport destination in Madurai that is used by about 3000 people per day. In 2004, ₹2.2 crore (equivalent to ₹8.5 crore or US$880,000 in 2026) was sanctioned by the state government for improving the infrastructure at the stadium. It was renovated once again in 2012.

It hosted the paralympic sports meeting, 1st South Zone Tamil Nadu Paralympic Swimming Championship in 2014. A proposal for constructing gallery around its hockey ground and for a shooting range were sent to government in 2014.

== Facilities ==
The stadium primarily used for hosting athletic events. Facilities at stadium include a 400m synthetic track for athletic events, four badminton courts, basketball courts, a cricket field, a football field, tennis courts, table tennis courts, volleyball court and a 25 metres (82 ft) swimming pool. It is also used to host other events such as kabaddi, powerlifting, and shooting in state and national levels. The stadium also has a hostel which houses up to 140 people.

== See also ==
- Madurai International Hockey Stadium
