= Rosan Kujur =

Indian field hockey player

Personal information
- Born: 3 May 2004 (age 22) Rajgangpur, Odisha, India

Sport
- Sport: Field hockey
- Position: Mid-fielder
Senior career
Years	Team	Caps	Goals
2021–	Hockey Odisha	16	5
2023–	Air India Sports Promotion Board	4	2
2024–	Kalinga Lancers	18	-
National team
Years	Team	Caps	Goals
2024–2025	India U21	24	(7)
2026–	India	1	(0)
Medal record
Men's field hockey
Representing India
Junior World Cup
Bronze medal – third place	2025 Tamilnadu
Junior Asia Cup
Gold medal – first place	2024 Muscat

Rosan Kujur (born 3 May 2004) is an Indian field hockey player from Odisha, representing the Indian senior team as a mid-fielder.

== Early life ==
Rosan hails from Rajgangpur in Sundergarh district of Odisha. He trained at the Panposh Sports Hostel for five years since 2016. Later, he underwent Khelo India trials at the Odisha Naval Tata Hockey High Performance Centre in Bhubaneswar.

== Career ==
Rosan led the Odisha U18 team to silver medal at the 2023 Khelo India Youth Games.

Rosan received his first call to the national junior team for the Europe tour in 2024. He competed in the 2024 Sultan of Johor Cup and was part of the team that won 2024 Junior Asia Cup. He scored one through penalty corner against New Zealand at the 2025 Sultan of Johor Cup as India won 4–2. He was part of the team that won bronze at the 2025 Junior World Cup.

Roshan made his national senior team debut against Argentina at the 2025–26 Men's FIH Pro League in Rourkela.
