= Lachlan Rogers =

Australian field hockey player

Personal information
- Born: 24 August 2004 (age 22) Hobart, Australia

Sport
- Sport: Field hockey
- Position: Midfield
Senior career
Years	Team	Caps	Goals
2023–	Tassie Tigers	-	-
National team
Years	Team	Caps	Goals
2023–2025	Australia U–21	23	(0)
2026–	Australia	0	(0)
Medal record
Men's field hockey
Representing Australia
Sultan of Johor Cup
Silver medal – second place	2023 Johor Bahru
Silver medal – second place	2024 Johor Bahru

Lachlan Rogers (born 24 August 2004) is an Australian field hockey player.

== Personal life ==
Rogers was born in Hobart, Australia.

He is a student at the University of Tasmania, completing a Bachelor of Medical Science and Doctor of Medicine.

== Career ==
=== Domestic league ===
Throughout his junior and senior club career, Rogers has represented Canterbury Hockey Club in the Hockey Tasmania Premier League.

In Hockey Australia's premier domestic league, the One Active Hockey One League, Rogers represents his home state as a member of the Tassie Tigers. He has been a member of the squad since 2023, and helped the side to a record best silver medal in the 2025 Season.

=== Under–21 ===
Rogers was a member of the Australian U–21 from 2023 to 2025.

Throughout his junior international career he medalled with the junior squad on two occasions. He won two successive silver medals at the Sultan of Johor Cup, an invitational tournament held in Johor Bahru. The first came in 2023 and the second in 2024.

He also represented the team at two FIH Junior World Cups; the 2023 and 2025 editions in Kuala Lumpur and Tamil Nadu, respectively.

=== Kookaburras ===
Rogers was named in the Kookaburras squad for the first time in 2025. He will make his senior international debut during season seven of the FIH Pro League.
