= Duncan Jackson =

Australian field hockey player (born 2006)

Personal information
- Born: 2 July 2006 (age 20) St Arnaud, Australia

Sport
- Sport: Field hockey
- Position: Forward
Senior career
Years	Team	Caps	Goals
2022–	MCC Hockey Section	70	49
2026–	HC Melbourne	3	3
National team
Years	Team	Caps	Goals
2025–	Australia U–21	15	(6)
Medal record
Representing Australia
Men's field hockey
Junior Oceania Cup
Gold medal – first place	2026 Redcliffe
Sultan of Johor Cup
Gold medal – first place	2025 Johor Bahru

Duncan Jackson (born 2 July 2006) is an international field hockey player from Australia.

He was named in Hockey Australia's inaugural Talent Accelerator 2032, recognising her as one of the most promising junior players with a dedicated pathway to lead into the XXXV Summer Olympics in Brisbane.

He competes in Hockey Australia's premier domestic competition, the ONE Active Hockey One.

== Personal life ==
Jackson grew up in Beazleys Bridge, a small locality in regional Victoria near the town of St Arnaud.

He is a scholarship holder at VIS.

== Australian leagues ==
Jackson currently competes in the Hockey Victoria Premier League competition for the MCC Hockey Section. He has been a member of the men's squad since 2022. During his career he has won two premierships with MCC.

In 2026 he made his debut for HC Melbourne during season six of the ONE Active Hockey One.

== National team ==
=== Under–21 ===
He made his debut for the Australian U–21 side, the Burras, in 2025. He was a member of the gold medal-winning squad at the Sultan of Johor Cup. He also represented the side at the FIH Junior World Cup in Chennai and Madurai, finishing in eleventh place.

In 2026 he won a gold medal at the Junior Oceania Cup in Redcliffe.

== Career statistics ==
Appearances and goals by club, season and competition
Club	Season	League			Other		Total	
Club	Season	Division	Apps	Goals	Apps	Goals	Apps	Goals
MCC Hockey Section	2022	Hockey Victoria Premier League	8	0	—		8	0
MCC Hockey Section	2023	Hockey Victoria Premier League	16	9	2	0	18	9
MCC Hockey Section	2024	Hockey Victoria Premier League	12	5	—		12	5
MCC Hockey Section	2025	Hockey Victoria Premier League	15	15	—		15	15
MCC Hockey Section	2026	Hockey Victoria Premier League	17	20	—		17	20
MCC Hockey Section	Total		68	49	2	0	70	49
HC Melbourne	2026	ONE Active Hockey One	3	3	—		3	3
HC Melbourne	Total		3	3	—		3	3
Career total			71	52	2	0	73	52
