= Dylan Martin =

Australian field hockey player

Personal information
- Born: 12 January 1998 (age 28)

Sport
- Sport: Field hockey
- Position: Defender
- Club: NSW Pride
National team
Years	Team	Caps	Goals
2021–	Australia	6	(0)
Medal record
Olympic Games
Silver medal – second place	2020 Tokyo	Team

Dylan Martin (born 12 January 1998) is an Australian field hockey player.

Martin was selected in the Kookaburras Olympics squad for the Tokyo 2020 Olympics. The team reached the final for the first time since 2004 but couldn't achieve gold, beaten by Belgium in a shootout. He competed in the 2020 Summer Olympics.
