= 2024 Sultan of Johor Cup =

Men's U21 field hockey tournament in Malaysia

Tournament details
- Host country: Malaysia
- City: Johor Bahru
- Dates: 19 October – 26 October
- Teams: 6
- Venue: Taman Daya Hockey Stadium

Final positions
- Champions: Great Britain (4th title)
- Runner-up: Australia
- Third place: India

Tournament statistics
- Matches played: 18
- Goals scored: 94 (5.22 per match)
- Top scorer: (New Zealand) Jonty Elmes (11 goals)
All statistics are correct as of 23 October 2024


The 2024 Sultan of Johor Cup was the twelfth edition of the Sultan of Johor Cup, an international men's under–21 field hockey tournament in Malaysia. It was held at the Taman Daya Hockey Stadium in Johor Bahru, Malaysia from 19 October to 26 October 2024.

== Participating nations ==
Including the host nation, 6 teams are competing in the tournament.

Country	FIH Junior Ranking	Previous Best Appearance	Best FIH Junior World Cup Finish
Australia	8	Champions (2016, 2017)	Champions (1997)
Great Britain*	16	Champions (2015, 2018, 2019)	Fourth Place (1997, 2001)
India	2	Champions (2013, 2014, 2022)	Champions (2001, 2016)
Japan	18	Third Place (2012)	Eleventh Place (1997)
Malaysia	11	Champions (2011)	Fourth Place (1979, 1982, 2013)
New Zealand	13	Fourth Place (2014)	Fourth Place (2009)

* = includes results representing England, Scotland and Wales

== Preliminary round ==
All times are local (UTC+8).

=== Standings ===
Pos	Team	Pld	W	D	L	GF	GA	GD	Pts	Qualification
1	Australia	5	3	1	1	21	9	+12	10	Final
2	Great Britain	5	3	1	1	13	10	+3	10	Final
3	India	5	3	1	1	17	15	+2	10	Third place game
4	New Zealand	5	2	3	0	12	9	+3	9	Third place game
5	Japan	5	1	0	4	9	16	−7	3	Fifth place game
6	Malaysia (H)	5	0	0	5	9	22	−13	0	Fifth place game

Source: FIH
Rules for classification: 1) points; 2) matches won; 3) goal difference; 4) goals for; 5) head-to-head result; 6) field goals for.
(H) Hosts

=== Results ===
19 October 2024
16:05 UTC+08:00

India	4–2	Japan
Ali 12'; G. Singh 36'; Anand 44'; Pal 47'	Report	Tanaka 26'; Yamanaka 57'

Umpires:
Jayden Pearson (AUS)
Kim Jiyong (KOR)

19 October 2024
18:15 UTC+08:00

Australia	1–3	Great Britain
Absolom 51'	Report	Draysey 22', 28'; Royden 37'

Umpires:
Mohomead Nawshad (SRI)
Mohd Ismady Alib (MAS)

19 October 2024
20:35 UTC+08:00

Malaysia	2–3	New Zealand
Osman 16'; Ashraf 55'	Report	Elmes 4', 48'; Nelson 56'

Umpires:
Hussain Al Hasani (OMA)
Jamie Telfer (SCO)

20 October 2024
16:05 UTC+08:00

India	6–4	Great Britain
Dad 7'; D. Singh 17', 50'; Sharda Nand 20', 50'; M. Singh 26'	Report	Penrose 2', 15'; Royden 46', 59'

Umpires:
Hussain Al Hasani (OMA)
Thipak Kanabathu (MAS)

20 October 2024
18:15 UTC+08:00

Australia	2–2	New Zealand
Pease 23'; Stanger 28'	Report	Parr 7'; Elmes 8'

Umpires:
KATO Takuma (JPN)
Sumit MOHITE (IND)

20 October 2024
20:35 UTC+08:00

Japan	4–1	Malaysia
Yamada 39'; Higuchi 43'; Kawahara 48'; Nishida 51'	Report	Ashraf 35'

Umpires:
Mohomead Nawshad (SRI)
Anton Paulin (NZL)

22 October 2024
16:05 UTC+08:00

Japan	1–5	Australia
Kimura 46'	Report	Downey 17'; Grobbelaar 34', 43', 55'; Absolom 59'

Umpires:
Jamie Telfer (SCO)
Ismady Alib Mohd (MAS)

22 October 2024
18:15 UTC+08:00

New Zealand	1–1	Great Britain
Elmes 48'	Report	Graves 56'

Umpires:
Thipak Kanabathu (MAS)
Sumit Mohite (IND)

22 October 2024
20:35 UTC+08:00

Malaysia	2–4	India
Aiman 8'; Osman 9'	Report	Sharda Nand 11'; A. Singh 13'; Talem 39'; Rohit 40'

Umpires:
Kim Jiyong (KOR)
Jayden Pearson (AUS)

23 October 2024
16:05 UTC+08:00

New Zealand	3–1	Japan
Elmes 8', 20', 33'	Report	Kawahara 59'

Umpires:
Jayden Pearson (AUS)
Mohomead Nawshad (SRI)

23 October 2024
18:15 UTC+08:00

Australia	4–0	India
Andrew 29'; Stanger 33', 39', 53'	Report

Umpires:
Anton Paulin (NZL)
Jamie Telfer (SCO)

23 October 2024
20:35 UTC+08:00

Great Britain	2–1	Malaysia
Draysey 15'; Neave 53'	Report	Che 17'

Umpires:
Takuma Kato (JPN)
Hussain Al Hasani (OMA)

25 October 2024
16:05 UTC+08:00

India	3–3	New Zealand
G. Singh 6'; Rohit 17'; Talem 60'	Report	Elmes 17', 32', 45'

Umpires:
Thipak Kanabathu (MAS)
Takuma Kato JPN)

25 October 2024
18:15 UTC+08:00

Great Britain	3–1	Japan
Draysey 3', 38'; Wilcher 27'	Report	Fujiwara 13'

Umpires:
Anton Paulin (NZL)
Mohd Ismady Alib (MAS)

25 October 2024
20:35 UTC+08:00

Malaysia	3–9	Australia
Danial 24'; Kamaruddin 29'; Osman 50'	Report	Henderson 2', 53'; Downey 3'; Grobbelaar 7'; Absolom 15'; Mallon 33'; Stanger 37'; Andrew 55'; Toonen 60'

Umpires:
Kim Jiyong (KOR)
Sumit Mohite (IND)

== Classification round ==
=== Fifth and sixth place ===
26 October 2024
15:35 UTC+08:00

Japan	2–2	Malaysia
Higuchi 48'; Watanabe 58'	Report	Che 33'; Osman 50'
Penalties
Higuchi (penalty shoot-out scored); Tanaka (penalty shoot-out missed); Nakajima (penalty shoot-out scored); Kawahara (penalty shoot-out scored)	3–0	(penalty shoot-out missed) Osman; (penalty shoot-out missed) Che; (penalty shoot-out missed) Handzalah

Umpires:
Jayden Pearson (AUS)
Mohomead Nawshad (SRI)

=== Third and fourth place ===
26 October 2024
18:05 UTC+08:00

India	2–2	New Zealand
D. Singh 11'; M. Singh 20'	Report	Brown 51'; Elmes 57'
Penalties
G. Singh (penalty shoot-out scored); Yadav (penalty shoot-out missed); M. Singh (penalty shoot-out scored); Kushwaha (penalty shoot-out scored)	3–2	(penalty shoot-out scored) Elmes; (penalty shoot-out scored) Elmes; (penalty shoot-out missed) Bax; (penalty shoot-out missed) Lints; (penalty shoot-out missed) Patel

Umpires:
Jamie Telfer (SCO)
Thipak Kanabathu (MAS)

=== Final ===
26 October 2024
20:35 UTC+08:00

Australia	2–3	Great Britain
Stanger 10'; Downey 13'	Report	Draysey 14'; Chihota 40'; Penrose 51'

Umpires:
Hussain Al Hasani (OMA)
Anton Paulin (NZL)

== Final standings ==
Pos	Team
1	Great Britain
2	Australia
3	India
4	New Zealand
5	Japan
6	Malaysia (H)

(H) Host

== Squads ==
India	Australia	Japan	Great Britain	Malaysia (H)	New Zealand
Ali Khan (GK)	Hunter Banyard (GK)	Kisho Kurodo (GK)	Calum Douglas (GK)	Rafaizul Saini (GK)	Hayden Ganley (GK)
Bikramjit Singh (GK)	Magnus McCauslund (GK)	Koki Origasa (GK)	James Carleton (GK)	Danish Afnan Faizal (GK)	Matthew Ruetsch (GK)
Amir Ali (C)	Toby Mallon	Yamato Kawahara (C)	Rory Penrose	Andywalfian Jeffrynus	Ryan Parr
Rohit (VC)	Noah Fahy	Hyoto Yamada	Ted Graves	Danish Danial Abdul Wahab	Dean Clarkson
Rosan Kujur	Lucas Toonen	Jun Watanabe	Alex Chihota	Adam Ashraf Johari	Matthew Wilson
Sharda Nand Tiwari	Hayden Pease	Neo Sato	Max Anderson	Addy Jazmi Jamlus	Owen Brown
Sukhvinder	Oliver Stebbings	Rakusei Yamanaka	Lewis Wilcher	Danish Aiman Khairil Anuar	Tim Crawford
Anmol Ekka	Dylan Downey	Tsubasa Tanaka	Henry Markham	Che Nur Aqilrullah Che Khairulzi Anwar	Javahn Jones
Talem Priyobarta	Lachlan Rogers	Jota Nakajima	Harrison Stone	Harris Iskandar Osman	Milan Patel
Ankit Pal	Liam Henderson	Yuito Matsuzaki	Matthew Hughson		Luka Clark
Manmeet Singh	Nye Roberts Campello	Atsuki Yamanaka	Monty Neave		Daniel Torr
Mukesh Toppo	Sam Lowndes	Shogo Sasaki	Thomas Austin		Benjamin Culhane
Chandan Yadav	Ollie Will	Sota Kato	Nathan Gladman		Sam Lints
Arshdeep Singh	Angus Adamson	Yuto Higuchi	Tom Spreckly		Bradley Rothwell
Sourabh Anand Kushwaha	Max Freedman	Naru Kimura	Kaden Draysey		Jordan Whittleston
Dilraj Singh	Ian Grobbelaar	Koyo Nishida	Cole Pidcock		Jonty Elmes
Mohd. Konain Dad	Patrick Andrew	Ruyuji Tanaka	Michael Royden		Aiden Bax
Gurjot Singh	Jesse Absolom	Yuma Fujiwara	Casper Lea		Gus Nelson

Team lists are subject to change following the tournament briefing meeting.

== Statistics ==
=== Goalscorers ===
There have been 94 goals scored in 18 matches, for an average of 5.22 goals per match (as of 26 October 2024).

11 goals

- (New Zealand) Jonty Elmes

6 goals

- (Australia) Daykin Stanger
- (United Kingdom) Kaden Draysey

4 goals

- (Australia) Ian Grobbelaar
- (Malaysia) Harris Osman

3 goals

- (Australia) Jesse Absolom
- (Australia) Dylan Downey
- (United Kingdom) Michael Royden
- (United Kingdom) Rory Penrose
- (India) Sharda Nand Tiwari
- (India) Dilraj Singh

2 goals

- (Australia) Patrick Andrew
- (Australia) Liam Henderson
- (United Kingdom) Monty Neave
- (India) Gurjot Singh
- (India) Rohit
- (India) Talem Priyobarta
- (India) Manmeet Singh
- (Japan) Yamato Kawahara
- (Japan) Yuto Higuchi
- (Malaysia) Adam Ashraf
- (Malaysia) Nur Aqilrullah Che

1 goal

- (Australia) Hayden Pease
- (Australia) Toby Mallon
- (Australia) Lucas Toonen
- (United Kingdom) Ted Graves
- (United Kingdom) Lewis Wilcher
- (United Kingdom) Alex Chihota
- (India) Amir Ali
- (India) Sourabh Anand Kushwaha
- (India) Ankit Pal
- (India) Mohd. Konain Dad
- (India) Arshdeep Singh
- (Japan) Tsubasa Tanaka
- (Japan) Rakusei Yamanaka
- (Japan) Hyota Yamada
- (Japan) Koyo Nishida
- (Japan) Naru Kimura
- (Japan) Yuma Fujiwara
- (Japan) Jun Watanabe
- (Malaysia) Muhammad Danish Aiman
- (Malaysia) Muhammad Danish Danial
- (Malaysia) Azimuddin Kamaruddin
- (New Zealand) Gus Nelson
- (New Zealand) Ryan Parr
- (New Zealand) Owen Brown

Source: FIH
