= Keenan Johnson =

Bahamian politician

The Honourable Keenan Johnson Senator

Member of the Senate of the Bahamas
- Incumbent
- Assumed office 19 May 2026

Personal details
- Party: Progressive Liberal Party
- Education: Cardiff University

Keenan S. P. Johnson is a Bahamian politician from the Progressive Liberal Party (PLP).

== Education ==
Johnson holds a Bachelor of Laws degree with honours from Cardiff University in Wales. He is a member of Alpha Phi Alpha Fraternity.

== Career ==
Johnson worked in the faculty the Eugene Dupuch Law School. He is an attorney. He was chairman of the Town Planning Committee. In 2011, he was endorsed by Bahamas Press to be Chairman of the Progressive Young Liberals. He was a legal adviser to the Progressive Liberal Party. Following the 2026 Bahamian general election, he was appointed to the Senate for the government. He was appointed Parliamentary Secretary in the Ministry of Education, Science & Technology by Philip Davis.

== See also ==
- 15th Bahamian Parliament
