= Dylan Downey =

Australian field hockey player

Personal information
- Born: 26 January 2005 (age 21) Goulburn, Australia

Sport
- Sport: Field hockey
- Position: Midfield
Senior career
Years	Team	Caps	Goals
2024–	NSW Pride	-	-
National team
Years	Team	Caps	Goals
2023–2025	Australia U–21	32	(6)
2026–	Australia	0	(0)
Medal record
Men's field hockey
Representing Australia
Junior Oceania Cup
Gold medal – first place	2025 Auckland
Sultan of Johor Cup
Gold medal – first place	2025 Johor Bahru
Silver medal – second place	2023 Johor Bahru
Silver medal – second place	2024 Johor Bahru

Dylan Downey (born 26 January 2005) is an Australian field hockey player.

== Personal life ==
Dylan Downey was born in Goulburn, Australia.

== Career ==
=== Domestic league ===
Throughout his junior career, Downey was a member of the Fireflys HC in the Goulburn District Hockey Association.

In Hockey Australia's domestic league, the One Active Hockey One, Downey represents his home state as a member of the NSW Pride.

=== Under–21 ===
Downey was a member of the Australian U–21 team from 2023 until 2025.

Throughout his junior international career he medalled with the junior squad on four occasions. He won gold at the 2025 Junior Oceania Cup in Auckland, as well as the 2025 edition of the Sultan of Johor Cup in Johor Bahru. He also won two silvers, at the 2023 and 2024 editions of the Sultan of Johor Cup.

He also represented the team at two FIH Junior World Cups; the 2023 and 2025 editions in Kuala Lumpur and Tamil Nadu, respectively.

=== Kookaburras ===
Downey was named in the Kookaburras squad for the first time in 2025. He will make his senior international debut during season seven of the FIH Pro League.
