= Ferdinand Steinebach =

German field hockey player (born 2006)

Ferdinand Steinebach (born 24 August 2006) is a field and indoor hockey player from Germany. He plays as a defender for Club an der Alster, Hamburg.

He was part of the Germany men's national under-21 field hockey team at the Men's FIA Hockey Junior World Cup held at Tamil Nadu, India from 1 to 10 December 2025. He scored a goal against Canada in Germany's 7–0 win. In July 2023, he was also part of the German U18 hockey National Team, which won the 2023 Euro Championship in Crefeld, where they defeated Belgium 3:2 in the final.

He made his youth international debut on 5 July 2021 at Liege, Belgium.
