= Bradley Rothwell =

New Zealand field hockey player

Personal information
- Born: 11 November 2004 (age 21) Whakatāne, New Zealand

Sport
- Sport: Field hockey
- Position: Defence
Senior career
Years	Team	Caps	Goals
2024–	Hauraki Mavericks	-	-
National team
Years	Team	Caps	Goals
2024–2025	New Zealand U–21	9	(0)
2025–	New Zealand	2	(0)
Medal record
Men's field hockey
Representing New Zealand
Oceania Cup
Silver medal – second place	2025 Darwin
Junior Oceania Cup
Silver medal – second place	2025 Auckland

Bradley 'Brad' Rothwell (born 11 November 2004) is a field hockey player from New Zealand.

== Life ==
Bradley Rothwell was born and raised in Whakatāne, New Zealand.

== Career ==
=== Domestic league ===
In domestic competitions, Rothwell plays within New Zealand. He most recently competed with the Hauraki Mavericks in the Premier Hockey League and Junior Hockey League, as well as Waikato in the Ford National Hockey Championship.

=== Under–21 ===
He is currently a member of the New Zealand U–21 squad. He represented the team for the first time in 2024 at the 2024 Sultan of Johor Cup in Johor Bahru. He also represented the team at the 2025 Junior Oceania Cup in Auckland, where he won a silver medal.

=== Black Sticks ===
Rothwell made his senior international debut for the Black Sticks in 2025. He earned his first senior cap during a match against Australia during the 2025 Oceania Cup in Darwin. At the tournament, he won a silver medal.
