= Ian Grobbelaar =

Australian field hockey player

Personal information
- Born: 22 April 2005 (age 21) Perth, Australia

Sport
- Sport: Field hockey
- Position: Defence
Senior career
Years	Team	Caps	Goals
2025–	Perth Thundersticks	-	-
National team
Years	Team	Caps	Goals
2024–2025	Australia U–21	21	(16)
2026–	Australia	0	(0)
Medal record
Men's field hockey
Representing Australia
Junior Oceania Cup
Gold medal – first place	2025 Auckland
Sultan of Johor Cup
Gold medal – first place	2025 Johor Bahru
Silver medal – second place	2024 Johor Bahru

Ian Grobbelaar (born 22 April 2005) is an Australian field hockey player.

== Personal life ==
Grobbelaar was born in Perth, Australia.

== Career ==
=== Domestic league ===
Throughout his junior career, Grobbelaar was a member of Hale Hockey Club. When he transitioned into seniors, he played a season of the Hockey WA Premier League with the North Coast Raiders Hockey Club in 2019, before returning to Hale, where he has played since 2020.

In Hockey Australia's domestic league, the One Active Hockey One, Grobbelaar represents his home state as a member of the Perth Thundersticks.

=== Under–21 ===
Grobbelaar has been a member of the Australian U–21 since 2024.

Throughout his junior international career he medalled with the junior squad on three occasions. He won gold at the 2025 Junior Oceania Cup in Auckland, as well as the 2025 edition of the Sultan of Johor Cup in Johor Bahru. He won silver at the 2024 edition of the Sultan of Johor Cup.

He also represented the team at the 2025 FIH Junior World Cup in Tamil Nadu.

=== Kookaburras ===
Grobbelaar was named in the Kookaburras squad for the first time in 2025. He will make his senior international debut during season seven of the FIH Pro League.
