= 2025 Men's FIH Hockey Junior World Cup =

14th edition of the Men's FIH Hockey Junior World Cup

Tournament details
- Host country: India
- Cities: Chennai; Madurai
- Dates: 28 November – 10 December
- Teams: 24 (from 5 confederations)
- Venue: 2 (in 2 host cities)

Final positions
- Champions: Germany (8th title)
- Runner-up: Spain
- Third place: India

Tournament statistics
- Matches played: 72
- Goals scored: 450 (6.25 per match)
- Top scorer: (Bangladesh) Amirul Islam (18 goals)
- Best player: (Netherlands) Casper van der Veen
- Best goalkeeper: (Germany) Jasper Ditzer

The 2025 Men's FIH Hockey Junior World Cup was the 14th edition of the Men's FIH Hockey Junior World Cup, the biennial men's under-21 field hockey world championship organized by the International Hockey Federation. It was held at the Mayor Radhakrishnan Hockey Stadium in Chennai and Madurai International Hockey Stadium in Madurai in Tamil Nadu, India, from 28 November to 10 December 2025.

The tournament featured 24 teams for the first time.

== Format ==
24 teams will be split into six groups and four teams and play a round-robin. After the preliminary round, the teams will be ranked in their position they finished. The group winners and the two best-second placed teams advance to the quarterfinals. The four remaining second-placed teams and the four best third-ranked teams play the 9 to 16th place playoffs and the remaining teams the 17 to 24th place games. From there on, a knockout system will be used.

== Qualification ==
Alongside the hosts, India, the 23 other teams qualify via the continental championships.

=== Qualified teams ===
Because only two teams participated in the Oceania qualifier the third quota from Oceania was reallocated to Europe, the continent of the next highest placed team in the Junior World Ranking. Oman replaced Pakistan in Pool B after the latter withdrew from the tournament having refused to travel to India, amid the 2025 India–Pakistan crisis, after its request for a "neutral venue" was rejected by the FIH. Pakistan had previously also withdrawn from the 2025 Hockey Asia Cup for the same reason.

Dates	Event	Location	Quotas	Qualifier(s)
11 June 2024	Hosts	—N/a	1	India
3–12 July 2024	2024 Junior Pan American Championship	Surrey, Canada	3	Argentina; Canada; Chile
14–20 July 2024	2024 EuroHockey U21 Championship	Terrassa, Spain	7	Belgium; England; France; Germany; Ireland; Netherlands; Spain
15–20 July 2024	2024 EuroHockey U21 Championship II	Walcz, Poland	1	Austria
15–20 July 2024	2024 EuroHockey U21 Championship II	Lausanne, Switzerland	1	Switzerland
26 November – 4 December 2024	2024 Junior Asia Cup	Muscat, Oman	6	Bangladesh; China; Japan; Malaysia; South Korea; Oman; ~~Pakistan~~; ~~Thailand~~
30 January – 2 February 2025	2025 Junior Oceania Cup	Auckland, New Zealand	2	Australia; New Zealand
18–25 April 2025	2024 Junior Africa Cup	Windhoek, Namibia	3	Egypt; Namibia; South Africa
Total			24	

== Venues ==
On 28 March 2025, Hockey India announced that Chennai and Madurai are the two host cities for the 2025 Junior World Cup.

2025 Men's FIH Hockey Junior World Cup is located in India	Madurai	Chennai
2025 Men's FIH Hockey Junior World Cup is located in India	Madurai International Hockey Stadium	Mayor Radhakrishnan Hockey Stadium
2025 Men's FIH Hockey Junior World Cup is located in India	Capacity: 2,000	Capacity: 8,670

== Draw ==
The draw was scheduled to take place on 24 June 2025, but was postponed later. It was held on 28 June 2025.

=== Seeding ===
The seeding was announced on 19 June 2025.

Seeded teams	Pot 1	Pot 2	Pot 3
Germany (Pool A); India (Pool B); Argentina (Pool C); Spain (Pool D); Netherlands (Pool E); France (Pool F)	Belgium; Australia; Pakistan; South Africa; Malaysia; New Zealand	South Korea; Canada; Egypt; England; Japan; Chile	Austria; Bangladesh; Ireland; Switzerland; China; Namibia

== Squads ==
Players born on or after 1 January 2004 were eligible to compete in the tournament.

== Preliminary round ==
=== Pool A ===
Pos	Team	Pld	W	D	L	GF	GA	GD	Pts	Qualification
1	Germany	3	3	0	0	16	1	+15	9	Quarter–finals
2	South Africa	3	2	0	1	11	6	+5	6	9–16th place quarter-finals
3	Ireland	3	1	0	2	6	10	−4	3	9–16th place quarter-finals
4	Canada	3	0	0	3	4	20	−16	0	17–24th place quarter-finals

Source: FIH
Rules for classification: 1) points; 2) matches won; 3) goal difference; 4) goals for; 5) head-to-head result; 6) field goals scored.

28 November 2025
09:00

Germany	4–0	South Africa
Warweg 19', 56'; Hasbach 43'; Glander 44'	Report

Madurai International Hockey Stadium, Madurai
Umpires:
Rawi Anbananthan (MAS)
Sourabh Rajput (IND)

28 November 2025
11:15

Canada	3–4	Ireland
Bhullar 26'; De Souza 48', 53'	Report	Rowe 13', 33'; G. Williams 35'; Thompson 41'

Madurai International Hockey Stadium, Madurai
Umpires:
Hideki Kinoshita (JPN)
Salim Lucky (BAN)

29 November 2025
13:30

South Africa	2–1	Ireland
Sendzul 43'; Montgomery 54'	Report	McKee 45'

Madurai International Hockey Stadium, Madurai
Umpires:
Benjamin Peters (USA)
Liu Yao (CHN)

29 November 2025
15:45

Canada	0–7	Germany
	Report	Nahr 14'; Hasbach 24', 51', 52' von Gersum 39'; Steinebach 39' von Schwerin 42'

Madurai International Hockey Stadium, Madurai
Umpires:
Hideki Kinoshita (JPN)
Khamis Al-Balushi (OMA)

1 December 2025
13:30

Germany	5–1	Ireland
von Gersum 4', 50'; Glander 34'; Kossel 52'; Franz 53'	Report	Dale 51'

Madurai International Hockey Stadium, Madurai
Umpires:
Annelize Rostron (RSA)
Hideki Kinoshita (JPN)

1 December 2025
15:45

South Africa	9–1	Canada
Brooker 8', 14', 36', 50'; Horn 22'; Maart 25'; Neuhoff 38'; Mentoor 48'; Montgomery 60'	Report	R. Thind 14'

Madurai International Hockey Stadium, Madurai
Umpires:
Rawi Anbananthan (MAS)
Salim Lucky (BAN)

=== Pool B ===
Pos	Team	Pld	W	D	L	GF	GA	GD	Pts	Qualification
1	India (H)	3	3	0	0	29	0	+29	9	Quarter–finals
2	Switzerland	3	2	0	1	7	7	0	6	9–16th place quarter-finals
3	Chile	3	1	0	2	4	10	−6	3	9–16th place quarter-finals
4	Oman	3	0	0	3	0	23	−23	0	17–24th place quarter-finals

Source: FIH
Rules for classification: 1) points; 2) matches won; 3) goal difference; 4) goals for; 5) head-to-head result; 6) field goals scored.
(H) Hosts

28 November 2025
17:45

Oman	0–4	Switzerland
	Report	Baumbach 15'; Mat. Ribaudo 23', 58'; Kraxner 33'

Mayor Radhakrishnan Hockey Stadium, Chennai
Umpires:
Ravdeep Sethi (HKG)
Bevan Nichol (NZL)

28 November 2025
20:30

India	7–0	Chile
Rosan 16', 21'; Dilraj 25', 34'; Ajeet 35'; Anmol 48'; Rohit 60'	Report

Mayor Radhakrishnan Hockey Stadium, Chennai
Umpires:
Daniël Veerman (NED)
Ilanggo Kanabathu (MAS)

29 November 2025
17:45

Chile	2–3	Switzerland
Hasson 37'; Duisberg 57'	Report	Baumbach 7'; Flück 18'; Mat. Ribaudo 45'

Mayor Radhakrishnan Hockey Stadium, Chennai
Umpires:
Mohammad Shahbaz (BAN)
Harry Collinson (ENG)

29 November 2025
20:00

Oman	0–17	India
	Report	Arshdeep 4', 33', 40'; Manmeet 17', 26', 36'; Anmol 29'; Dilraj 29', 32', 58'; Ajeet 34', 47'; Gurjot 39', 45'; Thounaojam 43', 50'; Sharda Nand 55'

Mayor Radhakrishnan Hockey Stadium, Chennai
Umpires:
Ana Vázquez (MEX)
Ahmed El-Sayed (EGY)

2 December 2025
13:30

Chile	2–0	Oman
Duisberg 10'; Taborga 47'	Report

Mayor Radhakrishnan Hockey Stadium, Chennai
Umpires:
Mohammad Shahbaz (BAN)
Harry Collinson (ENG)

2 December 2025
20:00

India	5–0	Switzerland
Manmeet 2', 11'; Sharda Nand 13', 54'; Arshdeep 28'	Report

Madurai International Hockey Stadium, Madurai
Umpires:
Rawi Anbananthan (MAS)
Timothy Sheahan (AUS)

=== Pool C ===
Pos	Team	Pld	W	D	L	GF	GA	GD	Pts	Qualification
1	Argentina	3	2	1	0	10	5	+5	7	Quarter–finals
2	New Zealand	3	2	1	0	11	8	+3	7	Quarter–finals
3	Japan	3	1	0	2	6	9	−3	3	9–16th place quarter-finals
4	China	3	0	0	3	6	11	−5	0	17–24th place quarter-finals

Source: FIH
Rules for classification: 1) points; 2) matches won; 3) goal difference; 4) goals for; 5) head-to-head result; 6) field goals scored.

28 November 2025
13:15

Argentina	4–1	Japan
Rodríguez 2', 56'; Torrigiani 24'; Correa 51'	Report	Kimura 53'

Mayor Radhakrishnan Hockey Stadium, Chennai
Umpires:
Harry Collinson (ENG)
Ana Vázquez (MEX)

28 November 2025
15:30

New Zealand	5–3	China
Elmes 8', 25', 25'; Brown 18', 23'	Report	Wang Y. 35', 55'; Zhang J. 51'

Mayor Radhakrishnan Hockey Stadium, Chennai
Umpires:
Ahmed El-Sayed (EGY)
Mohammad Shahbaz (BAN)

30 November 2025
13:15

Japan	3–2	China
Hara 19'; Ono 20'; Terasaka 50'	Report	Ning 11'; Zhang J. 57'

Mayor Radhakrishnan Hockey Stadium, Chennai
Umpires:
Daniël Veerman (NED)
Deepa (IND)

30 November 2025
15:30

New Zealand	3–3	Argentina
Elmes 4', 32', 39'	Report	Torrigiani 2'; Correa 11', 40'

Mayor Radhakrishnan Hockey Stadium, Chennai
Umpires:
Ilanggo Kanabathu (MAS)
Mohammad Shahbaz (BAN)

1 December 2025
17:45

Japan	2–3	New Zealand
Toya 6'; Mori 15'	Report	Illerbrun 5'; Brown 38'; Elmes 41'

Mayor Radhakrishnan Hockey Stadium, Chennai
Umpires:
Ilanggo Kanabathu (MAS)
Ravdeep Sethi (HKG)

1 December 2025
21:20

Argentina	3–1	China
Correa 15', 16', 51'	Report	Di 37'

Mayor Radhakrishnan Hockey Stadium, Chennai
Umpires:
Daniël Veerman (NED)
Deepa (IND)

=== Pool D ===
Pos	Team	Pld	W	D	L	GF	GA	GD	Pts	Qualification
1	Spain	3	3	0	0	23	0	+23	9	Quarter–finals
2	Belgium	3	2	0	1	22	3	+19	6	Quarter–finals
3	Namibia	3	1	0	2	5	27	−22	3	17–24th place quarter-finals
4	Egypt	3	0	0	3	2	22	−20	0	17–24th place quarter-finals

Source: FIH
Rules for classification: 1) points; 2) matches won; 3) goal difference; 4) goals for; 5) head-to-head result; 6) field goals scored.

28 November 2025
13:30

Spain	8–0	Egypt
Ávila 5', 24', 32'; Serrahima 20'; Martin 27', 46'; Medina 36'; Moran 54'	Report

Madurai International Hockey Stadium, Madurai
Umpires:
Timothy Sheahan (AUS)
Liu Yao (CHN)

28 November 2025
15:45

Belgium	12–1	Namibia
Lauwers 11', 24', 41', 42'; Rogge 18'; Labouchere 18', 22', 58'; Francois 30'; Thiéry 30'; Balthazar 36', 58'	Report	Lassen 55'

Madurai International Hockey Stadium, Madurai
Umpires:
Benjamin Peters (USA)
Khamis Al-Balushi (OMA)

30 November 2025
09:00

Egypt	2–4	Namibia
Kasem 28'; Hegab 53'	Report	Li. Bruys 23'; De Jager 26'; Van der Merwe 32'; Britz 60+'

Madurai International Hockey Stadium, Madurai
Umpires:
Sourabh Rajput (IND)
Khamis Al-Balushi (OMA)

30 November 2025
11:15

Belgium	0–2	Spain
	Report	Prado 20'; Ávila 32'

Madurai International Hockey Stadium, Madurai
Umpires:
Rawi Anbananthan (MAS)
Benjamin Peters (USA)

2 December 2025
11:00

Spain	13–0	Namibia
Ávila 5', 23', 47', 58'; Medina 7', 27'; Serrahima 15'; Mustarós 37'; Moran 41'; Martin 44', 59'; Bozal 54'; Amat 55'	Report

Madurai International Hockey Stadium, Madurai
Umpires:
Bevan Nichol (NZL)
Salim Lucky (BAN)

2 December 2025
13:15

Egypt	0–10	Belgium
	Report	Balthazar 4', 23'; Langer 18', 25', 59'; Thiéry 28'; Francois 33'; Cloetens 50'; Labouchere 53'; Van Heel 56'

Madurai International Hockey Stadium, Madurai
Umpires:
Sourabh Rajput (IND)
Hideki Kinoshita (JPN)

=== Pool E ===
Pos	Team	Pld	W	D	L	GF	GA	GD	Pts	Qualification
1	Netherlands	3	3	0	0	22	3	+19	9	Quarter–finals
2	England	3	2	0	1	19	6	+13	6	9–16th place quarter-finals
3	Malaysia	3	1	0	2	6	10	−4	3	9–16th place quarter-finals
4	Austria	3	0	0	3	1	29	−28	0	17–24th place quarter-finals

Source: FIH
Rules for classification: 1) points; 2) matches won; 3) goal difference; 4) goals for; 5) head-to-head result; 6) field goals scored.

29 November 2025
09:00

Netherlands	5–3	England
Van 't Land 2', 49' van der Veen 26'; Wolbert 39'; Trieling 54'	Report	Draysey 11'; Royden 29'; Fletcher 49'

Madurai International Hockey Stadium, Madurai
Umpires:
Annelize Rostron (RSA)
Timothy Sheahan (AUS)

29 November 2025
11:15

Malaysia	5–1	Austria
Osman 28'; Johari 47', 56'; Panicker 55'; Khairil 57'	Report	Kaiser 56'

Madurai International Hockey Stadium, Madurai
Umpires:
Sourabh Rajput (IND)
Salim Lucky (BAN)

30 November 2025
13:30

England	13–0	Austria
Fletcher 21', 27'; Draysey 24', 25', 29', 53'; Markham 32', 38', 47'; Royden 36'; Bennett 40'; Chihota 49'; Anderson 54'	Report

Madurai International Hockey Stadium, Madurai
Umpires:
Annelize Rostron (RSA)
Liu Yao (CHN)

30 November 2025
15:45

Malaysia	0–6	Netherlands
	Report	van der Veen 9', 10'; Wolbert 20', 21'; Bakker 28'; Boermans 42'

Madurai International Hockey Stadium, Madurai
Umpires:
Timothy Sheahan (AUS)
Hideki Kinoshita (JPN)

2 December 2025
15:30

Netherlands	11–0	Austria
van Bijnen 21', 35'; Hafkamp 27'; Wolbert 31'; Bakker 36' de Vuijst 39' van der Veen 48', 53', 54' van der Valk 49'; Van 't Land 56'	Report

Madurai International Hockey Stadium, Madurai
Umpires:
Liu Yao (CHN)
Khamis Al-Balushi (OMA)

2 December 2025
17:45

England	3–1	Malaysia
Markham 4'; Royden 36'; Chihota 57'	Report	Kamaruddin 47'

Madurai International Hockey Stadium, Madurai
Umpires:
Benjamin Peters (USA)
Annelize Rostron (RSA)

=== Pool F ===
Pos	Team	Pld	W	D	L	GF	GA	GD	Pts	Qualification
1	France	3	3	0	0	22	6	+16	9	Quarter–finals
2	Australia	3	2	0	1	11	12	−1	6	9–16th place quarter-finals
3	Bangladesh	3	0	1	2	8	11	−3	1	17–24th place quarter-finals
4	South Korea	3	0	1	2	5	17	−12	1	17–24th place quarter-finals

Source: FIH
Rules for classification: 1) points; 2) matches won; 3) goal difference; 4) goals for; 5) head-to-head result; 6) field goals scored.

29 November 2025
13:15

France	11–1	South Korea
Lorrazuri 2', 49'; Dolou 8'; Plauche 23', 26', 42'; Loussif 37'; Sura 43'; Saint-Martin 45', 55'; Morcrette 59'	Report	Lee G. 40'

Mayor Radhakrishnan Hockey Stadium, Chennai
Umpires:
Bevan Nichol (NZL)
Daniël Veerman (NED)

29 November 2025
15:30

Australia	5–3	Bangladesh
Will 1'; Grobbelaar 18'; Brick 22'; Jackson 24'; Stanger 48'	Report	A. Islam 14', 42', 59'

Mayor Radhakrishnan Hockey Stadium, Chennai
Umpires:
Deepa (IND)
Ravdeep Sethi (HKG)

30 November 2025
17:45

South Korea	3–3	Bangladesh
Lee M. 8', 17'; Son 13'	Report	A. Islam 36', 46', 56'

Mayor Radhakrishnan Hockey Stadium, Chennai
Umpires:
Ana Vázquez (MEX)
Bevan Nichol (NZL)

30 November 2025
20:00

Australia	3–8	France
Hawthorne 12'; Andrew 22'; Grobbelaar 28'	Report	Saint-Martin 9'; Liddiard 30'; Gaillard 33', 59'; Piole 49'; Dolou 53', 60'; Martinache 58'

Mayor Radhakrishnan Hockey Stadium, Chennai
Umpires:
Harry Collinson (ENG)
Ahmed El-Sayed (EGY)

2 December 2025
15:45

France	3–2	Bangladesh
Gaillard 7'; Lorrazuri 32'; Liddiard 38'	Report	Abdullah 28'; A. Islam 55'

Mayor Radhakrishnan Hockey Stadium, Chennai
Umpires:
Ana Vázquez (MEX)
Ravdeep Sethi (HKG)

2 December 2025
18:00

South Korea	1–3	Australia
Son 22'	Report	Jackson 17'; Grobbelaar 35'; Stanger 53'

Mayor Radhakrishnan Hockey Stadium, Chennai
Umpires:
Ahmed El-Sayed (EGY)
Ilanggo Kanabathu (MAS)

=== Ranking ===
Teams were ranked according to their position in the preliminary round.

==== First-ranked teams ====
Pos	Pool	Team	Pld	W	D	L	GF	GA	GD	Pts	Qualification
1	B	India (H)	3	3	0	0	29	0	+29	9	Quarter-finals
2	D	Spain	3	3	0	0	23	0	+23	9	Quarter-finals
3	E	Netherlands	3	3	0	0	22	3	+19	9	Quarter-finals
4	F	France	3	3	0	0	22	6	+16	9	Quarter-finals
5	A	Germany	3	3	0	0	16	1	+15	9	Quarter-finals
6	C	Argentina	3	2	1	0	10	5	+5	7	Quarter-finals

Source: FIH
Rules for classification: 1) points; 2) matches won; 3) goal difference; 4) goals for; 5) head-to-head result; 6) field goals scored.
(H) Hosts

==== Second-ranked teams ====
Pos	Pool	Team	Pld	W	D	L	GF	GA	GD	Pts	Qualification
1	C	New Zealand	3	2	1	0	11	8	+3	7	Quarter-finals
2	D	Belgium	3	2	0	1	22	3	+19	6	Quarter-finals
3	E	England	3	2	0	1	19	6	+13	6	9–16th place quarterfinals
4	A	South Africa	3	2	0	1	11	6	+5	6	9–16th place quarterfinals
5	B	Switzerland	3	2	0	1	7	7	0	6	9–16th place quarterfinals
6	F	Australia	3	2	0	1	11	12	−1	6	9–16th place quarterfinals

Source: FIH
Rules for classification: 1) points; 2) matches won; 3) goal difference; 4) goals for; 5) head-to-head result; 6) field goals scored.

==== Third-ranked teams ====
Pos	Pool	Team	Pld	W	D	L	GF	GA	GD	Pts	Qualification
1	C	Japan	3	1	0	2	6	9	−3	3	9–16th place quarterfinals
2	A	Ireland	3	1	0	2	6	10	−4	3	9–16th place quarterfinals
3	E	Malaysia	3	1	0	2	6	10	−4	3	9–16th place quarterfinals
4	B	Chile	3	1	0	2	4	10	−6	3	9–16th place quarterfinals
5	D	Namibia	3	1	0	2	5	27	−22	3	17–24th place quarterfinals
6	F	Bangladesh	3	0	1	2	8	11	−3	1	17–24th place quarterfinals

Source: FIH
Rules for classification: 1) points; 2) matches won; 3) goal difference; 4) goals for; 5) head-to-head result; 6) field goals scored.

==== Fourth-ranked teams ====
Pos	Pool	Team	Pld	W	D	L	GF	GA	GD	Pts	Qualification
1	F	South Korea	3	0	1	2	5	17	−12	1	17–24th place quarterfinals
2	C	China	3	0	0	3	6	11	−5	0	17–24th place quarterfinals
3	A	Canada	3	0	0	3	4	20	−16	0	17–24th place quarterfinals
4	D	Egypt	3	0	0	3	2	22	−20	0	17–24th place quarterfinals
5	C	Oman	3	0	0	3	0	23	−23	0	17–24th place quarterfinals
6	E	Austria	3	0	0	3	1	29	−28	0	17–24th place quarterfinals

Source: FIH
Rules for classification: 1) points; 2) matches won; 3) goal difference; 4) goals for; 5) head-to-head result; 6) field goals scored.

== 17th to 24th place classification ==
=== Bracket ===
17–24th place quarter-finals
4 December
Namibia	2 (0)
Austria (p.s.o.)	2 (2)
4 December
China	3
Canada	2
4 December
Bangladesh	13
Oman	0
4 December
South Korea	6
Egypt	3

Cross-overs
6 December
Austria (p.s.o.)	1 (3)
China	1 (1)
6 December
Bangladesh	5
South Korea	3

17th place
8 December
Austria	4
Bangladesh	5
19th place
8 December
China	4
South Korea	5

=== 17–24th place quarter-finals ===
4 December 2025
09:00

Namibia	2–2	Austria
Britz 40', 43'	Report	B. Meisel 42'; Rathkolb 45'
Penalties
Graham (penalty shoot-out missed); Van der Merwe (penalty shoot-out missed) de Jager (penalty shoot-out missed); Lassen (penalty shoot-out missed)	0–2	(penalty shoot-out missed) Kucera; (penalty shoot-out scored) B. Meisel; (penalty shoot-out scored) Losonci; (penalty shoot-out missed) M. Meisel

Madurai International Hockey Stadium, Madurai
Umpires:
Ravdeep Sethi (HKG)
Salim Lucky (BAN)

4 December 2025
11:30

Bangladesh	13–0	Oman
A. Islam 11', 15', 15', 34', 53'; Hasan 19', 25', 47'; Abdullah 33', 47'; Joy 40'; Saju 51', 60'	Report

Madurai International Hockey Stadium, Madurai
Umpires:
Ahmed El-Sayed (EGY)
Liu Yao (CHN)

4 December 2025
14:00

South Korea	6–3	Egypt
Lee M. 18', 32', 50', 52'; Song 23'; Park S. 26'	Report	Abdelmonem 8', 37'; Ghanem 60'

Madurai International Hockey Stadium, Madurai
Umpires:
Mohammad Shahbaz (BAN)
Khamis Al-Balushi (OMA)

4 December 2025
16:30

China	3–2	Canada
Wang Y. 25', 56'; Ning 60'	Report	R. Thind 8', 16'

Madurai International Hockey Stadium, Madurai
Umpires:
Sourabh Rajput (IND)
Deepa (IND)

=== 21st to 24th place classification ===
21st–24th place semi-finals
6 December
Namibia	1
Canada	3
6 December
Oman	2
Egypt	8

21st place
8 December
Canada	2 (2)
Egypt (p.s.o.)	2 (3)
23rd place
8 December
Namibia	4
Oman	2

==== 21st–24th place semi-finals ====
6 December 2025
09:00

Namibia	1–3	Canada
Britz 55'	Report	De Souza 14', 54'; R. Thind 60'

Madurai International Hockey Stadium, Madurai
Umpires:
Khamis Al-Balushi (OMA)
Liu Yao (CHN)

6 December 2025
11:30

Oman	2–8	Egypt
Al Hasni 38', 57'	Report	Abdelmonem 10'; Fahmy 14'; Hegab 24'; Kasem 25', 29'; Y. Hussein 44'; Ghanem 46', 59'

Madurai International Hockey Stadium, Madurai
Umpires:
Hideki Kinoshita (JPN)
Mohammad Shahbaz (BAN)

==== 23rd and 24th place ====
8 December 2025
09:00

Namibia	4–2	Oman
Van der Merwe 19'; G. Myburgh 22'; Britz 55' van Rooyen 60'	Report	Al-Wahaibi 14'; Al Hasni 48'

Madurai International Hockey Stadium, Madurai
Umpires:
Liu Yao (CHN)
Salim Lucky (BAN)

==== 21st and 22nd place ====
8 December 2025
11:30

Canada	2–2	Egypt
R. Thind 43', 45+'	Report	Abdelmonem 3', 38'
Penalties
R. Thind (penalty shoot-out scored); Gill (penalty shoot-out missed); Aardenburg (penalty shoot-out scored); De Souza (penalty shoot-out missed); Aranha (penalty shoot-out missed)	2–3	(penalty shoot-out scored) Hegab; (penalty shoot-out missed) Hassanein; (penalty shoot-out scored) Fouda; (penalty shoot-out missed) Abdelmonem; (penalty shoot-out scored) Kasem

Madurai International Hockey Stadium, Madurai
Umpires:
Mohammad Shahbaz Ali (BAN)
Khamis Al Balushi (OMA)

=== 17th to 20th place classification ===
==== Cross-overs ====
6 December 2025
14:00

Austria	1–1	China
Kelner 56'	Report	Sun 31'
Penalties
M. Meisel (penalty shoot-out scored); Losonci (penalty shoot-out missed); Kucera (penalty shoot-out missed); B. Meisel (penalty shoot-out scored); Fink (penalty shoot-out scored)	3–1	(penalty shoot-out missed) Li P. (penalty shoot-out missed) Chen; (penalty shoot-out scored) Ning; (penalty shoot-out missed) Sun

Madurai International Hockey Stadium, Madurai
Umpires:
Ahmed El-Sayed (EGY)
Deepa (IND)

6 December 2025
16:30

Bangladesh	5–3	South Korea
A. Islam 21', 24', 35'; Joy 52'; Hasan 60'	Report	Lee M. 10', 20', 53'

Madurai International Hockey Stadium, Madurai
Umpires:
Ravdeep Sethi (HKG)
Sourabh Rajput (IND)

==== 19th and 20th place ====
8 December 2025
14:00

China	4–5	South Korea
Li 34', 38', 60'; Di 56'	Report	Lee M. 1', 13'; Park J. 20'; Kim D. 37'; Lee G. 48'

Madurai International Hockey Stadium, Madurai
Umpires:
Sourabh Rajput (IND)
Ahmed Elsayed (EGY)

==== 17th and 18th place ====
8 December 2025
16:30

Austria	4–5	Bangladesh
Losonci 44'; Kelner 51'; Kaiser 57'; Nyckowiak 59'	Report	A. Islam 15', 50', 52'; Hossain 27'; Hasan 35'

Madurai International Hockey Stadium, Madurai
Umpires:
Ravdeep Sethi (HKG)
Hideki Kinoshita (JPN)

== Ninth to sixteenth place classification ==
=== Bracket ===
9–16th place quarter-finals
4 December
England	3
Chile	1
4 December
Australia	1
Japan	0
4 December
South Africa	3
Malaysia	1
4 December
Switzerland	2
Ireland	5

Cross-overs
6 December
England	3
Australia	1
6 December
South Africa	2
Ireland	4

Ninth place
9 December
England	2
Ireland	0
Eleventh place
9 December
Australia	4
South Africa	2

==== 9–16th place quarter-finals ====
4 December 2025
12:30

England	3–1	Chile
Draysey 13'; Anderson 19'; Sturch-Hibbitt 27'	Report	Vargas 23'

Mayor Radhakrishnan Hockey Stadium, Chennai
Umpires:
Ana Vázquez (MEX)
Rawi Anbananthan (MAS)

4 December 2025
15:00

South Africa	3–1	Malaysia
Brooker 18', 39'; Montgomery 58'	Report	Mat 48'

Mayor Radhakrishnan Hockey Stadium, Chennai
Umpires:
Harry Collinson (ENG)
Timothy Sheahan (AUS)

4 December 2025
17:30

Switzerland	2–5	Ireland
L. Thijs 30'; Flück 50'	Report	Dale 25'; G. Williams 36', 38'; Dunlop 39'; Rowe 60'

Mayor Radhakrishnan Hockey Stadium, Chennai
Umpires:
Annelize Rostron (RSA)
Ilanggo Kanabathu (MAS)

4 December 2025
20:00

Australia	1–0	Japan
Grobbelaar 56'	Report

Mayor Radhakrishnan Hockey Stadium, Chennai
Umpires:
Daniël Veerman (NED)
Benjamin Peters (USA)

=== 13th to 16th place classification ===
13–16th place semi-finals
6 December
Chile	1
Japan	3
6 December
Malaysia	7
Switzerland	3

13th place
9 December
Japan	1 (0)
Malaysia (p.s.o.)	1 (3)
15th place
9 December
Chile	2
Switzerland	1

==== 13–16th place semi-finals ====
6 December 2025
12:30

Chile	1–3	Japan
Pizarro 34'	Report	Fujiwara 24', 43'; Kimura 48'

Mayor Radhakrishnan Hockey Stadium, Chennai
Umpires:
Daniël Veerman (NED)
Benjamin Peters (USA)

6 December 2025
15:00

Malaysia	7–3	Switzerland
Mat 5', 43'; Hadi 6'; Osman 19'; M Nazrien 21'; Kamaruddin 37'; Khairil 46'	Report	Flück 13', 53'; Kraxner 32'

Mayor Radhakrishnan Hockey Stadium, Chennai
Umpires:
Timothy Sheahan (AUS)
Ana Vázquez (MEX)

==== 15th and 16th place ====
9 December 2025
12:30

Chile	2–1	Switzerland
Kouyoumdjian Velasco 25'; Richard 40'	Report	Flück 18'

Mayor Radhakrishnan Hockey Stadium, Chennai
Umpires:
Bevan Nichol (NZL)
Annelize Rostron (RSA)

==== 13th and 14th place ====
9 December 2025
15:00

Japan	1–1	Malaysia
Hara 52'	Report	Kamaruddin 28'
Penalties
Sasaki (penalty shoot-out missed); Kimura (penalty shoot-out missed); Hara (penalty shoot-out missed)	0–3	(penalty shoot-out scored) Khairil; (penalty shoot-out scored) Jamlus; (penalty shoot-out scored) Johari

Mayor Radhakrishnan Hockey Stadium, Chennai
Umpires:
Ravdeep Sethi (HKG)
Ana Vazquez Escalante (MEX)

=== Ninth to twelfth place classification ===
==== Cross-overs ====
6 December 2025
17:00

England	3–1	Australia
Draysey 8'; Royden 46'; Graves 60'	Report	Leigh 43'

Mayor Radhakrishnan Hockey Stadium, Chennai
Umpires:
Rawi Anbananthan (MAS)
Ilanggo Kanabathu (MAS)

6 December 2025
20:00

South Africa	2–4	Ireland
Sendzul 45'; Horn 59'	Report	G. Williams 16', 36', 50'; Mulvey 42'

Mayor Radhakrishnan Hockey Stadium, Chennai
Umpires:
Bevan Nichol (NZL)
Harry Collinson (ENG)

==== Eleventh and twelfth place ====
9 December 2025
17:30

Australia	4–2	South Africa
Jackson 22'; Andrew 35'; Brick 51'; Hawthorne 55'	Report	Brooker 30'; Kraai 57'

Mayor Radhakrishnan Hockey Stadium, Chennai
Umpires:
Sourabh Rajput (IND)
Mohammad Shahbaz Ali (BAN)

==== Ninth and tenth place ====
9 December 2025
20:00

England	2–0	Ireland
Draysey 10', 23'	Report

Mayor Radhakrishnan Hockey Stadium, Chennai
Umpires:
Ahmed Elsayed (EGY)
Benjamin Peters (USA)

== Medal round ==
=== Bracket ===
Quarter-finals
5 December
India (p.s.o.)	2 (4)
Belgium	2 (3)
5 December
France	2 (1)
Germany (p.s.o.)	2 (3)
5 December
Spain	4
New Zealand	3
5 December
Netherlands	0
Argentina	1

Semi-finals
7 December
India	1
Germany	5
7 December
Spain	2
Argentina	1

Final
10 December
Germany (p.s.o.)	1 (3)
Spain	1 (2)
Third place
10 December
India	4
Argentina	2

==== Quarter-finals ====
5 December 2025
12:30

Spain	4–3	New Zealand
Mustarós 2'; Martin 10'; Serrahima 12'; Ávila 60+'	Report	Lints 22', 60'; Parr 34'

Mayor Radhakrishnan Hockey Stadium, Chennai
Umpires:
Ilanggo Kanabathu (MAS)
Benjamin Peters (USA)

5 December 2025
15:00

France	2–2	Germany
Martinache 30'; Dolou 55'	Report	von Schwerin 30'; Glander 36'
Penalties
Sura (penalty shoot-out missed); Michaelis (penalty shoot-out scored); Mahé (penalty shoot-out missed); Martinache (penalty shoot-out missed)	1–3	(penalty shoot-out scored) von Gersum; (penalty shoot-out scored) Warweg; (penalty shoot-out missed) Stahmann; (penalty shoot-out scored) Kossel

Mayor Radhakrishnan Hockey Stadium, Chennai
Umpires:
Bevan Nichol (NZL)
Annelize Rostron (RSA)

5 December 2025
17:30

Netherlands	0–1	Argentina
	Report	T. Ruiz 52'

Mayor Radhakrishnan Hockey Stadium, Chennai
Umpires:
Harry Collinson (ENG)
Rawi Anbananthan (MAS)

5 December 2025
20:00

India	2–2	Belgium
Rohit 45+'; Sharda Nand 48'	Report	Cornez-Massant 13'; Cloetens 59'
Penalties
Sharda Nand (penalty shoot-out scored); Sharda Nand (penalty shoot-out scored); Sharda Nand (penalty shoot-out scored); Manmeet (penalty shoot-out missed); Ankit (penalty shoot-out scored)	4–3	(penalty shoot-out scored) Labouchere; (penalty shoot-out scored) Hawaux; (penalty shoot-out scored) Langendries; (penalty shoot-out missed) Rogge; (penalty shoot-out missed) Bogaerts

Mayor Radhakrishnan Hockey Stadium, Chennai
Umpires:
Timothy Sheahan (AUS)
Daniël Veerman (NED)

=== Fifth to eighth place classification ===
Cross-overs
7 December
Belgium	3
France	2
7 December
New Zealand	3
Netherlands	6

Fifth place
10 December
Belgium (p.s.o.)	3 (4)
Netherlands	3 (3)
Seventh place
10 December
France	4
New Zealand	1

==== Cross-overs ====
7 December 2025
12:30

Belgium	3–2	France
Lauwers 26'; Langer 46'; Labouchere 58'	Report	Liddiard 22'; Sura 35'

Mayor Radhakrishnan Hockey Stadium, Chennai
Umpires:
Daniël Veerman (NED)
Annelize Rostron (RSA)

7 December 2025
15:00

New Zealand	3–6	Netherlands
Elmes 18', 29', 59'	Report	Veen 4' van der Veen 4', 8', 36'; Van 't Land 21'; Wolbert 26'

Mayor Radhakrishnan Hockey Stadium, Chennai
Umpires:
Timothy Sheahan (AUS)
Benjamin Peters (USA)

==== Seventh and eighth place ====
10 December 2025
12:30

France	4–1	New Zealand
Lorrazuri 2'; Saint-Martin 13'; Gaillard 41', 60'	Report	Elmes 59'

Mayor Radhakrishnan Hockey Stadium, Chennai
Umpires:
Hideki Kinoshita (JPN)
Harry Collinson (ENG)

==== Fifth and sixth place ====
10 December 2025
15:00

Belgium	3–3	Netherlands
Labouchere 18', 30', 58'	Report	Bakker 30'; Van der Veen 43'; Wolbert 44'
Penalties
Balthazar (penalty shoot-out scored); Hawaux (penalty shoot-out scored); Langer (penalty shoot-out scored); Francois (penalty shoot-out missed); Bogaerts (penalty shoot-out scored)	4–3	(penalty shoot-out missed) Van der Veen; (penalty shoot-out missed) Wolbert; (penalty shoot-out scored) Plantenga; (penalty shoot-out scored) Van 't Land; (penalty shoot-out scored) Bakker

Mayor Radhakrishnan Hockey Stadium, Chennai
Umpires:
Bevan Nichol (NZL)
Rawi Anbananthan (MAS)

=== First to fourth place classification ===
==== Semi-finals ====
7 December 2025
17:30

Spain	2–1	Argentina
Mena 7'; Serrahima 56'	Report	J. Fernández 21'

Mayor Radhakrishnan Hockey Stadium, Chennai
Umpires:
Rawi Anbananthan (MAS)
Bevan Nichol (NZL)

7 December 2025
20:00

India	1–5	Germany
Anmol 51'	Report	Kossel 14', 30'; Wex 15'; Von Gersum 40'; Hasbach 49'

Mayor Radhakrishnan Hockey Stadium, Chennai
Umpires:
Ilanggo Kanabathu (MAS)
Harry Collinson (ENG)

==== Third and fourth place ====
10 December 2025
17:30

India	4–2	Argentina
Ankit 49'; Manmeet 52'; Sharda Nand 57'; Anmol 58'	Report	Rodríguez 3'; S. Fernández 44'

Mayor Radhakrishnan Hockey Stadium, Chennai
Umpires:
Annelize Rostron (RSA)
Ilanggo Kanabathu (MAS)

==== Final ====
10 December 2025
20:00

Germany	1–1	Spain
Warweg 26'	Report	Mustaros 33'
Penalties
Von Gersum (penalty shoot-out missed); Warweg (penalty shoot-out missed); Geyer (penalty shoot-out scored); Von Schwerin (penalty shoot-out scored); Hasbach (penalty shoot-out scored)	3–2	(penalty shoot-out missed) Amat; (penalty shoot-out scored) Román; (penalty shoot-out missed) Bozal; (penalty shoot-out scored) Prado; (penalty shoot-out missed) Medina

Mayor Radhakrishnan Hockey Stadium, Chennai
Umpires:
Timothy Sheahan (AUS)
Daniël Veerman (NED)

== Statistics ==
=== Final standings ===
Pos	Team
1st place, gold medalist(s)	Germany
2nd place, silver medalist(s)	Spain
3rd place, bronze medalist(s)	India (H)
4	Argentina
5	Belgium
6	Netherlands
7	France
8	New Zealand
9	England
10	Ireland
11	Australia
12	South Africa
13	Malaysia
14	Japan
15	Chile
16	Switzerland
17	Bangladesh
18	Austria
19	South Korea
20	China
21	Egypt
22	Canada
23	Namibia
24	Oman

Source: FIH
(H) Host

=== Goalscorers ===
There were 450 goals scored in 72 matches, for an average of 6.25 goals per match.

18 goals

- (Bangladesh) Amirul Islam

11 goals

- (New Zealand) Jonty Elmes
- (South Korea) Lee Min-hyuk

10 goals

- (Netherlands) Casper van der Veen

9 goals

- (England) Kaden Draysey
- (Spain) Bruno Ávila

8 goals

- (Belgium) Hugo Labouchere

7 goals

- (South Africa) Jaydon Brooker

6 goals

- (Argentina) Bruno Correa
- (Canada) Robin Thind
- (India) Manmeet Singh
- (Ireland) Gregory Williams
- (Netherlands) Joppe Wolbert

5 goals

- (Bangladesh) Rakibul Hasan
- (Belgium) Mathis Lauwers
- (Egypt) Basel Abdelmonem
- (France) Tom Gaillard
- (Germany) Ben Hasbach
- (India) Dilraj Singh
- (India) Sharda Nand Tiwari
- (Namibia) John-Paul Britz
- (Spain) Josep Martín

4 goals

- (Australia) Ian Grobbelaar
- (Belgium) Lucas Balthazar
- (Belgium) Maximilian Langer
- (Canada) Leighton De Souza
- (China) Wang Yubo
- (England) Henry Markham
- (England) Michael Royden
- (France) Hugo Dolou
- (France) Gabin Lorrazuri
- (France) Victor Saint-Martin
- (Germany) Jonas von Gersum
- (India) Anmol Ekka
- (India) Arshdeep Singh
- (Netherlands) Jan van 't Land
- (Spain) Albert Serrahima

3 goals

- (Argentina) Nicolás Rodríguez
- (Australia) Duncan Jackson
- (Austria) Julian Kaiser
- (Bangladesh) Muhammad Abdullah
- (China) Li Pengfei
- (Egypt) Mohamed Ghanem
- (Egypt) Abdelrahman Kasem
- (England) George Fletcher
- (France) James Liddiard
- (France) Arthur Plauche
- (Germany) Paul Glander
- (Germany) Lukas Kossel
- (Germany) Justus Warweg
- (India) Ajeet Yadav
- (Ireland) Louis Rowe
- (Malaysia) Azimuddin Kamaruddin
- (Malaysia) Danish Khairil
- (Malaysia) Aqil Mat
- (Netherlands) Thies Bakker
- (New Zealand) Owen Brown
- (Oman) Alhussin Al Hasni
- (South Africa) Ross Montgomery
- (Spain) Andrés Medina
- (Spain) Nicolas Mustarós
- (Switzerland) Jens Flück
- (Switzerland) Mattia Ribaudo

2 goals

- (Argentina) Mateo Torrigiani
- (Australia) Patrick Andrew
- (Australia) Dylan Brick
- (Australia) Matthew Hawthorne
- (Australia) Daykin Stanger
- (Austria) Benjamin Kelner
- (Bangladesh) Obidul Joy
- (Bangladesh) Muhammad Saju
- (Belgium) Jean Cloetens
- (Belgium) Mathias Francois
- (Belgium) Benjamin Thiéry
- (Chile) Felipé Duisberg
- (China) Di Yanwei
- (China) Ning Dongjun
- (China) Zhang Jialiang
- (Egypt) Mohab Hegab
- (England) Max Anderson
- (England) Alex Chihota
- (France) Malo Martinache
- (France) Tassilo Sura
- (Germany) Alec von Schwerin
- (India) Rosan Kujur
- (India) Thounaojam Luwang
- (India) Rohit
- (India) Gurjot Singh
- (Ireland) Samuel Dale
- (Japan) Yuma Fujiwara
- (Japan) Shun Hara
- (Japan) Naru Kimura
- (Malaysia) Harris Osman
- (Namibia) Josh van der Merwe
- (Netherlands) Finn van Bijnen
- (New Zealand) Sam Lints
- (South Africa) Brett Horn
- (South Africa) Reuben Sendzul
- (South Korea) Lee Gyeong-hu
- (South Korea) Son Seung-han
- (Spain) Ton Moran
- (Switzerland) Jonathan Baumbach
- (Switzerland) Léonard Kraxner

1 goal

- (Argentina) Juan Fernández
- (Argentina) Santiago Fernández
- (Argentina) Tomás Ruiz
- (Australia) Kade Leigh
- (Australia) Oliver Will
- (Austria) Andor Losonci
- (Austria) Benedikt Meisel
- (Austria) Mateusz Nyckowiak
- (Bangladesh) Hozifa Hossain
- (Belgium) Gaspard Cornez-Massant
- (Belgium) Marin Van Heel
- (Belgium) Nathan Rogge
- (Canada) Gurnoor Bhullar
- (Chile) Tomás Hasson
- (Chile) Juan Kouyoumdjian Velasco
- (Chile) Santiago Pizarro
- (Chile) Felipé Richard
- (Chile) Tomás Taborga
- (Chile) Javier Vargas
- (China) Sun Jingran
- (Egypt) Ahmed Fahmy
- (Egypt) Youssef Hussein
- (England) Ollly Bennett
- (England) Ted Graves
- (England) Jonny Sturch-Hibbitt
- (France) Achille Loussif
- (France) Arthur Morcrette
- (France) Gabriel Piole
- (Germany) Christian Franz
- (Germany) Quirin Nahr
- (Germany) Ferdinand Steinebach
- (Germany) Titus Wex
- (India) Ankit Pal
- (Ireland) Rex Dunlop
- (Ireland) Matthew McKee
- (Ireland) Noa Mulvey
- (Ireland) Milo Thompson
- (Japan) Matsuki Mori
- (Japan) Shu Ono
- (Japan) Kazuki Terasaka
- (Japan) Kyoya Toya
- (Malaysia) Handzalah Hadi
- (Malaysia) Adam Johari
- (Malaysia) Rahuul M Nazrien
- (Malaysia) Naaveenesh Panicker
- (Namibia) Liam Bruys
- (Namibia) James de Jager
- (Namibia) Mathew Lassen
- (Namibia) Gerhard Myburgh
- (Namibia) Ludwig van Rooyen
- (Netherlands) Tjeerd Boermans
- (Netherlands) Casper Hafkamp
- (Netherlands) Danilo Trieling
- (Netherlands) Jens de Vuijst
- (Netherlands) Pepijn van der Valk
- (Netherlands) Peppe Veen
- (New Zealand) Scott Illerbrun
- (New Zealand) Ryan Parr
- (Oman) Maitham Al-Wahaibi
- (South Africa) Litha Kraai
- (South Africa) Sian Maart
- (South Africa) Carlon Mentoor
- (South Africa) Daniel Neuhoff
- (South Korea) Kim Dong-geon
- (South Korea) Park Jae-won
- (South Korea) Park Seo-won
- (South Korea) Song Jeong-seob
- (Spain) Pere Amat
- (Spain) Aleix Bozal
- (Spain) Mario Mena
- (Spain) Juan Prado
- (Switzerland) Max Fischbach
- (Switzerland) Yannick Hug
- (Switzerland) Louis Thijs

Source: FIH

== See also ==
- 2025 Women's FIH Hockey Junior World Cup
