= New Zealand men's national under-21 field hockey team =

New Zealand
- Association: New Zealand Hockey Federation
- Confederation: OHF (Oceania)
- Head Coach: Hemant Lala
- Assistant coach(es): Joe Hanks
- Manager: Joe Piggott
- Captain: Scott Illerbrun

Junior World Cup
- Appearances: 1982 (first in 7)
- Best result: 4th (2009)

The New Zealand men's national under-21 field hockey team, represents New Zealand in international under-21 field hockey and at the Junior World Cup. The team is controlled by the governing body for field hockey in New Zealand, Hockey New Zealand, which is currently a member of the Oceania Hockey Federation (OHF) and the International Hockey Federation (FIH). The team's official nickname is the Future Black Sticks U21.

The team's first recorded appearance was at the Junior World Cup was in 1982, where the team finished 10th. Later, they finished 9th in 2001, 4th in 2009, 7th in 2013 and 9th in 2016. Their last appearance was in 2023, and in 2025, they are 12th in the FIH junior world ranking ahead of the event in India.

The current squad qualified for the 2027 Men's FIH Hockey Junior World Cup by finishing second in the 2026 Men's Junior Oceania Cup.

== Current squad ==
The squad was announced on 29 September 2025 in 2025 FIH Hockey Junior World Cup.

Head coach: Mike Delaney

No.	Pos.	Player	Date of birth (age)	Caps	Club
1		Ryan Parr	5 March 2005 (aged 20)	29	
2		Dean Clarkson	5 April 2005 (aged 20)	15	
4		Owen Brown	2 August 2005 (aged 20)	15	
5		Scott Illerbrun	29 April 2006 (aged 19)	6	
7		Javahn Jones	13 October 2004 (aged 21)	15	
8		Milan Patel	8 February 2004 (aged 21)	15	
11		Jakarta Klebert	12 December 2004 (aged 21)	9	
12		Finlay Neale	28 February 2006 (aged 19)	9	
13		Sam Lints	4 March 2004 (aged 21)	29	
14	DF	Bradley Rothwell	11 November 2004 (aged 21)	15	
16		Jordan Whittleston	29 December 2004 (aged 21)	18	
18		Rocco Ludolph	31 December 2004 (aged 21)	9	
19	FW	Jonty Elmes	10 November 2004 (aged 21)	17	
20		Aiden Bax	4 September 2005 (aged 20)	26	
21	MF	Gus Nelson	31 March 2004 (aged 21)	26	
22		Nicholas Stephenson	14 June 2004 (aged 21)	6	
23	GK	Matthew Ruetsch	30 December 2004 (aged 21)	15	
24	GK	Hugh Nixon	28 July 2004 (aged 21)	6	

== See also ==
- New Zealand men's national field hockey team
- New Zealand women's national under-21 field hockey team
