= Under 21 Australian Hockey Championships =

- Current season, competition or edition: [[2026 Men's Championship; 2026 Women's Championship]]
- Sport: Field hockey
- First season: 1946 (men); 1984 (women)
- No. of teams: 8
- Country: Australia
- Most recent champions: Western Australia (men); Queensland (women)
- Most titles: Western Australia (21 men's titles); Queensland (16 women's titles)
- Website: www.hockey.org.au

The Under 21 Australian Hockey Championships are the annual national under-21 field hockey championships conducted by Hockey Australia. Separate men's and women's tournaments are contested each year, bringing together the leading emerging players from Australia's eight state and territory member associations.

The men's championship was first contested in 1946, while the women's championship commenced in 1984. The championships represent Australia's premier domestic under-21 competition and form the final stage of Hockey Australia's national player pathway before international junior representation. Many players who compete at the championships progress to represent Australia in the Burras and Jillaroos, before advancing to the Kookaburras and Hockeyroos.

The most recent championships were held in Canberra, Australian Capital Territory, in 2026. Western Australia won a record fifth consecutive men's title after defeating Tasmania in a penalty shoot-out following a 4–4 draw, while Queensland defeated Victoria 2–1 to claim the women's championship.

== Competition format ==
The tournament is divided into two pools of four teams, with each team playing the other three teams in its pool once during the preliminary stage.

Following the pool stage, all eight teams progress to the quarter-finals. The quarter-finals are played as crossover matches between the two pools, with teams matched according to their pool finishing positions.

The quarter-final winners advance to the semi-finals, while the losing teams move into the fifth-to-eighth-place classification matches. The semi-final winners contest the gold medal match, while the losing semi-finalists play in the bronze medal match.

The remaining classification matches determine the final placings from fifth to eighth.

== Competition rules ==
Since the 2015 edition of the tournament, games are played under FIH rules, having four 15-minute quarters.

=== Points system ===
Result	Points
Win	3
Draw	1
Loss	0

=== Finals matches ===
During finals if games end in a tie, no overtime will be played and the match will go straight to a penalty shoot-out.

== Men's Championship ==
=== Results ===
- Note: The following summaries comprise results from 2011 onwards, while the tournament was founded earlier.

Year	Host	Final			Third place match		
Year	Host	Champions	Score	Runners-up	Third place	Score	Fourth place
2011	Perth, WA	Western Australia	2–1 (a.e.t.)	New South Wales	Queensland	4–3	South Australia
2012	Hobart, TAS	Queensland	3–0	Western Australia	New South Wales	5–5	Tasmania
2013	Brisbane, QLD	Queensland	3–2	New South Wales	(Victoria (state)); Victoria	3–1	South Australia
2014	Sydney, NSW	New South Wales	7–2	(Victoria (state)); Victoria	Western Australia	3–0	Queensland
2015	Canberra, ACT	(Victoria (state)); Victoria	2–1	Western Australia	New South Wales	6–3	Queensland
2016	Sydney, NSW	(Victoria (state)); Victoria	2–0	New South Wales	Queensland	4–3	Western Australia
2017	Wollongong, NSW	New South Wales	4–3	Queensland	Western Australia	1–1 (3–1) (pen.)	(Victoria (state)); Victoria
2018	Sydney, NSW	Tasmania	1–1 (3–2) (pen.)	(Victoria (state)); Victoria	Western Australia	3–1	Australian Capital Territory
2019	Lismore, NSW	New South Wales	2–1	(Victoria (state)); Victoria	Western Australia	4–0	South Australia
2020	—	Cancelled due to the COVID-19 pandemic.					
2021	—	Cancelled due to the COVID-19 pandemic.					
2022	Perth, WA	Western Australia	2–1	(Victoria (state)); Victoria	New South Wales State	6–1	Australian Capital Territory
2023	Sydney, NSW	Western Australia	1–0	New South Wales	Queensland	2–2 (3–2) (pen.)	(Victoria (state)); Victoria
2024	Newcastle, NSW	Western Australia	4–0	(Victoria (state)); Victoria	Queensland	2–1	Tasmania
2025	Bendigo, VIC	Western Australia	1–0	New South Wales	Tasmania	3–1	South Australia
2026	Canberra, ACT	Western Australia	4–4 (3–1) (pen.)	Tasmania	New South Wales	1–0	Queensland

=== Team performances ===
Team	2011	2012	2013	2014	2015	2016	2017	2018	2019	2022	2023	2024	2025	2026
Australian Capital Territory	6th	7th	8th	6th	7th	5th	5th	4th	8th	4th	6th	6th	7th	6th
New South Wales; New South Wales State	2nd	3rd	2nd	1st	3rd	2nd	1st	6th	1st	3rd	2nd	5th	2nd	3rd
New South Wales Blues	—	—	—	—	—	—	—	7th	6th	7th	—	—	—	—
(Northern Territory); Northern Territory; Territory Stingers	5th	6th	5th	7th	8th	8th	7th	—	—	8th	8th	7th	8th	8th
Queensland	3rd	1st	1st	4th	4th	3rd	2nd	5th	5th	5th	3rd	3rd	5th	4th
South Australia	4th	7th	4th	8th	6th	7th	8th	8th	4th	9th	5th	8th	4th	7th
Tasmania	8th	3rd	7th	5th	5th	6th	6th	1st	7th	6th	7th	4th	3rd	2nd
(Victoria (state)); Victoria	7th	5th	3rd	2nd	1st	1st	4th	2nd	2nd	2nd	4th	2nd	6th	5th
Western Australia	1st	2nd	6th	3rd	2nd	4th	3rd	3rd	3rd	1st	1st	1st	1st	1st
Total	8	8	8	8	8	8	8	8	8	9	8	8	8	8

=== Championships by State or Territory ===
The men's championship was first contested in 1946. The totals below include all championships won since the competition's inception.

Rank	State or territory	Championships
1	Western Australia	21
2	Queensland	18
3	(Victoria (state)) Victoria	17
4	New South Wales	15
5	South Australia	7
6	Tasmania	1
7=	Australian Capital Territory	0
7=	Northern Territory	0

=== Awards ===
The following awards are presented annually during the Australian Under 21 Hockey Championships:

- Player of the Tournament – awarded to the outstanding player in the men's competition.
- Leading Goalscorer – awarded to the player scoring the most goals in the competition.
- Play the Whistle Award – presented to the team that best demonstrates respect for officials and the spirit of fair play throughout the tournament.

Year	Player of the Tournament	Leading goalscorer	Goals	Play the Whistle Award
2011	Matthew Willis ( New South Wales)	Jacob Webber ( Queensland)	13	—
2012	Aran Zalewski ( Western Australia)	Blake Govers ( New South Wales)	12	—
2013	Kane Posselt ( Queensland)	Blake Govers ( New South Wales)	17	—
2014	—	Blake Govers ( New South Wales)	20	—
2015	Frazer Gerrard ( Western Australia)	Jack Elliott ( New South Wales)	10	Western Australia
2016	Tim Howard ( Queensland)	Andrew Scanlon ( (Victoria (state)) Victoria)	6	Tasmania
2017	—	Liam Flynn ( Western Australia)	11	—
2018	Jack Welch ( Tasmania)	Niranjan Gupte ( Australian Capital Territory); Ehren Hazell ( New South Wales)	7	Australian Capital Territory
2019	Brayden King ( Western Australia)	Patrick Coates ( (Victoria (state)) Victoria)	11	—
2022	Brodee Foster ( Western Australia)	Brodee Foster ( Western Australia)	15	Australian Capital Territory
2023	Liam Henderson ( (Victoria (state)) Victoria)	Aiden Dooley ( Australian Capital Territory)	9	Queensland
2024	Liam Henderson ( (Victoria (state)) Victoria)	Max Johnstone ( Tasmania)	8	Northern Territory
2025	Dylan Downey ( New South Wales)	Matthew Hawthorne ( Queensland)	14	(Victoria (state)) Victoria
2026	Duncan Jackson ( (Victoria (state)) Victoria)	Duncan Jackson ( (Victoria (state)) Victoria)	11	South Australia

== Women's Championship ==
=== Results ===
- Note: The following summaries comprise results from 2011 onwards, while the tournament was founded earlier.

Year	Host	Gold medal match			Bronze medal match		
Year	Host	Champions	Score	Runners-up	Third place	Score	Fourth place
2011	Canberra, ACT	Western Australia	1–0 (a.e.t.)	New South Wales	Queensland	1–0	(Victoria (state)); Victoria
2012	Adelaide, SA	New South Wales	3–1	South Australia	Queensland	3–1	Australian Capital Territory
2013	Darwin, NT	Queensland	1–1 (2–1) (pen.)	New South Wales	South Australia	1–0	Australian Capital Territory
2014	Perth, WA	New South Wales	3–1	Queensland	Australian Capital Territory	1–0	South Australia
2015	Hobart, TAS	(Victoria (state)); Victoria	3–2	New South Wales	Queensland	4–1	Western Australia
2016	Sydney, NSW	Queensland	2–1	Western Australia	New South Wales	3–3 (4–3) (pen.)	(Victoria (state)); Victoria
2017	Wollongong, NSW	New South Wales	2–1	Western Australia	Queensland	3–0	South Australia
2018	Sydney, NSW	New South Wales	2–1	Queensland	(Victoria (state)); Victoria	4–2	South Australia
2019	Lismore, NSW	Queensland	2–1	(Victoria (state)); Victoria	Western Australia	1–0	South Australia
2020	—	Cancelled due to the COVID-19 pandemic.					
2021	—	Cancelled due to the COVID-19 pandemic.					
2022	Perth, WA	(Victoria (state)); Victoria	2–2 (3–1) (pen.)	Western Australia	Queensland	2–2 (3–2) (pen.)	New South Wales
2023	Sydney, NSW	New South Wales	4–3	Queensland	Western Australia	8–0	Tasmania
2024	Newcastle, NSW	Queensland	2–1	(Victoria (state)); Victoria	New South Wales	6–2	Northern Territory
2025	Bendigo, VIC	Australian Capital Territory	2–1	Queensland	(Victoria (state)); Victoria	6–0	Tasmania
2026	Canberra, ACT	Queensland	2–1	New South Wales	(Victoria (state)); Victoria	5–2	Western Australia

=== Team performances ===
Team	2011	2012	2013	2014	2015	2016	2017	2018	2019	2022	2023	2024	2025	2026
Australian Capital Territory	5th	4th	4th	3rd	7th	8th	6th	6th	8th	8th	8th	5th	1st	5th
(Australia); East Coast Venom	—	—	—	—	—	7th	—	—	—	—	—	—	—	—
New South Wales Blues	—	—	—	—	6th	—	—	5th	7th	7th	7th	—	—	—
New South Wales State; New South Wales	2nd	1st	2nd	1st	2nd	3rd	1st	1st	5th	4th	1st	3rd	5th	2nd
(Northern Territory); Northern Territory; Territory Stingers	8th	7th	6th	—	—	—	7th	—	—	—	—	4th	7th	6th
Queensland	3rd	3rd	1st	2nd	3rd	1st	3rd	2nd	1st	3rd	2nd	1st	2nd	1st
South Australia	7th	2nd	3rd	4th	5th	5th	4th	4th	4th	6th	6th	8th	8th	7th
Tasmania	6th	8th	8th	7th	8th	6th	8th	8th	6th	5th	4th	7th	4th	8th
(Victoria (state)); Victoria	4th	6th	7th	5th	1st	4th	5th	3rd	2nd	1st	5th	2nd	3rd	3rd
Western Australia	1st	5th	5th	6th	4th	2nd	2nd	7th	3rd	2nd	3rd	6th	6th	4th
Total	8	8	8	7	8	8	8	8	8	8	8	8	8	8

=== Championships by State or Territory ===
The women's championship was first contested in 1984. The totals below include all championships won since the competition's inception.

Rank	State or territory	Championships
1	Queensland	16
2	New South Wales	9
3	(Victoria (state)) Victoria	8
4	Western Australia	4
5	Australian Capital Territory	2
6=	South Australia	1
6=	Tasmania	1
8	Northern Territory	0

=== Awards ===
The following awards are presented annually during the Australian Under 21 Hockey Championships:

- Player of the Tournament – awarded to the outstanding player in the women's competition.
- Leading Goalscorer – awarded to the player scoring the most goals in the competition.
- Play the Whistle Award – presented to the team that best demonstrates respect for officials and the spirit of fair play throughout the tournament.

Year	Player of the Tournament	Leading goalscorer	Goals	Play the Whistle Award
2011	Alyssa Kerr ( Queensland)	Kathryn Slattery ( Western Australia)	9	New South Wales
2012	Tegan Purse ( (Victoria (state)) Victoria)	Tegan Purse ( (Victoria (state)) Victoria)	8	—
2013	Jacqui Day ( Queensland)	Kathryn Slattery ( Western Australia)	9	Tasmania
2014	Murphy Allendorf ( Queensland)	Murphy Allendorf ( Queensland)	7	New South Wales
2015	—	Amber Mutch ( South Australia)	7	(Victoria (state)) Victoria
2016	Renee Taylor ( Queensland)	Aisling Utri ( (Victoria (state)) Victoria)	7	(Australia) East Coast Venom
2017	—	Grace Stewart ( New South Wales)	7	—
2018	Morgan Mathison ( Queensland)	Rebecca Greiner Queensland	7	Queensland
2019	Amy Lawton ( (Victoria (state)) Victoria)	Abigail Wilson ( New South Wales)	6	—
2022	Grace Young ( New South Wales State)	Tatum Stewart ( Queensland)	7	Australian Capital Territory
2023	Alana Kavanagh ( New South Wales State)	Lily Neilson ( New South Wales State); Zara Geddis ( (Victoria (state)) Victoria)	9	Queensland
2024	Karissa van der Wath ( Queensland)	Makayla Jones ( New South Wales)	8	Northern Territory
2025	Georgina West ( Australian Capital Territory)	Evie Stansby ( (Victoria (state)) Victoria)	6	Australian Capital Territory
2026	Karissa van der Wath ( Queensland)	Zara Geddis ( (Victoria (state)) Victoria); Montana Carr ( Queensland)	6	(Northern Territory) Territory Stingers
