= 2018 Under 21 Men's Australian Hockey Championships =

Tournament details
- Host country: Australia
- City: Sydney
- Teams: 8
- Venue(s): Sydney Olympic Park

Final positions
- Champions: Tasmania
- Runner-up: (Victoria (state)) Victoria
- Third place: Western Australia

Tournament statistics
- Matches played: 24
- Goals scored: 107 (4.46 per match)
- Top scorer(s): (Australian Capital Territory) Niranjan Gupte (New South Wales) Ehren Hazell (7 goals)

The 2018 Men's Under 21 Australian Hockey Championships is a Field Hockey tournament being held in the New South Wales city of Sydney between 4–11 July 2018.

== Competition format ==
The tournament is divided into two pools, Pool A and Pool B, consisting of four teams in a round robin format. At the conclusion of the pool stage, teams progress to the quarterfinals, where the winners progress to contest the medals, while the losing teams playoff for fifth to eighth place.

== Teams ==
- (Australian Capital Territory) ACT
- (South Australia) SA
- (New South Wales) NSW
- (Tasmania) TAS
- (New South Wales) NSW B
- (Victoria (state)) VIC
- (Queensland) QLD
- (Western Australia) WA

== Results ==
=== Preliminary round ===
==== Pool A ====
Pos	Team	Pld	W	D	L	GF	GA	GD	Pts
1	(New South Wales) NSW	3	2	0	1	6	2	+4	6
2	(Victoria (state)) VIC	3	2	0	1	7	6	+1	6
3	(Australian Capital Territory) ACT	3	2	0	1	7	8	−1	6
4	(South Australia) SA	3	0	0	3	5	9	−4	0

Source: Hockey Australia

4 July 2018
12:00

NSW (New South Wales)	3–0	(Australian Capital Territory) ACT
Miotto 21'; Mayo 25'; Farmilo 41'	Report

Sydney Olympic Park: Pitch 2
Umpires:
Aidan Elliot (AUS)
Harley Schenk (AUS)

4 July 2018
14:00

VIC (Victoria (state))	3–2	(South Australia) SA
Steffens 1'; Snowden 13'; Hendry 25'	Report	Wells 40'; Menadue 42'

Sydney Olympic Park: Pitch 2
Umpires:
Todd Gilroy (AUS)
Jordan Moore (AUS)

5 July 2018
13:00

ACT (Australian Capital Territory)	3–2	(South Australia) SA
N. Gupte 21', 49'; Knight 60'	Report	Busiko 46', 53'

Sydney Olympic Park: Pitch 1
Umpires:
Todd Gilroy (AUS)
David Bridgford (AUS)

5 July 2018
15:00

VIC (Victoria (state))	1–0	(New South Wales) NSW
Henderson 42'	Report

Sydney Olympic Park: Pitch 1
Umpires:
Aidan Elliot (AUS)
Nathan Jennings (AUS)

7 July 2018
14:00

NSW (New South Wales)	3–1	(South Australia) SA
Farmilo 22'; Hazell 27'; Miotto 33'	Report	Nyrhinen 49'

Sydney Olympic Park: Pitch 1
Umpires:
David Bridgford (AUS)
Jordan Moore (AUS)

7 July 2018
16:00

ACT (Australian Capital Territory)	4–3	(Victoria (state)) VIC
N. Gupte 20', 49'; McLennan 35'; Knight 39'	Report	Ephraums 2', 31'; Steffens 18'

Sydney Olympic Park: Pitch 1
Umpires:
Stirling Sharpe (AUS)
Harley Schenk (AUS)

==== Pool B ====
Pos	Team	Pld	W	D	L	GF	GA	GD	Pts
1	(Western Australia) WA	3	2	0	1	7	4	+3	6
2	(New South Wales) NSW B	3	2	0	1	7	4	+3	6
3	(Queensland) QLD	3	2	0	1	8	7	+1	6
4	(Tasmania) TAS	3	0	0	3	4	11	−7	0

Source: Hockey Australia

4 July 2018
16:00

QLD (Queensland)	3–2	(Tasmania) TAS
Wotherspoon 7'; Hart 25'; Anderson 32'	Report	McCulloch 24', 59'

Sydney Olympic Park: Pitch 2
Umpires:
Stirling Sharpe (AUS)
Nathan Jennings (AUS)

4 July 2018
18:00

WA (Western Australia)	1–0	(New South Wales) NSW B
Flynn 17'	Report

Sydney Olympic Park: Pitch 2
Umpires:
David Bridgford (AUS)
Timothy Sheahan (AUS)

5 July 2018
17:00

WA (Western Australia)	2–3	(Queensland) QLD
Green 7'; Flynn 15'	Report	Young 2'; Hart 41'; Buckley 55'

Sydney Olympic Park: Pitch 1
Umpires:
Stirling Sharpe (AUS)
Timothy Sheahan (AUS)

5 July 2018
19:00

TAS (Tasmania)	1–4	(New South Wales) NSW B
McCulloch 22'	Report	Stahl 3'; Carr 19', 54'; Dolby 51'

Sydney Olympic Park: Pitch 1
Umpires:
Jordan Moore (AUS)
Harley Schenk (AUS)

7 July 2018
10:00

QLD (Queensland)	2–3	(New South Wales) NSW B
Hart 31'; Anderson 34'	Report	Gallagher 25'; Wigham 48'; Carr 55'

Sydney Olympic Park: Pitch 1
Umpires:
Aidan Elliot (AUS)
Todd Gilroy (AUS)

7 July 2018
12:00

TAS (Tasmania)	1–4	(Western Australia) WA
Beltz 45'	Report	Harvie 15'; Rasmussen 16', 27'; Gavranich 47'

Sydney Olympic Park: Pitch 1
Umpires:
Timothy Sheahan (AUS)
Nathan Jennings (AUS)

=== Classification round ===
Quarterfinals
8 July 2018
(New South Wales) NSW	3 (1)
(Tasmania) TAS (p.s.o)	3 (2)
8 July 2018
(New South Wales) NSW B	2 (2)
(Australian Capital Territory) ACT (p.s.o)	2 (4)
8 July 2018
(Victoria (state)) VIC	1
(Queensland) QLD	0
8 July 2018
(Western Australia) WA	3
(South Australia) SA	1

Semi-finals
10 July 2018
(Tasmania) TAS	4
(Australian Capital Territory) ACT	3
10 July 2018
(Victoria (state)) VIC	5
(Western Australia) WA	1

Final
11 July 2018
(Tasmania) TAS (p.s.o)	1 (3)
(Victoria (state)) VIC	1 (2)
Third place match
11 July 2018
(Australian Capital Territory) ACT	1
(Western Australia) WA	3

==== Quarterfinals ====
8 July 2018
12:00

NSW B (New South Wales)	2–2	(Australian Capital Territory) ACT
Dolby 1'; Carr 19'	Report	N. Gupte 8'; Knight 28'
Penalties
Pickering (penalty shoot-out scored); Thomas (penalty shoot-out missed); Wigham (penalty shoot-out missed); Walker (penalty shoot-out scored)	2–4	(penalty shoot-out scored) Stuckey; (penalty shoot-out missed) B. Staines; (penalty shoot-out scored) Knight; (penalty shoot-out scored) N. Gupte; (penalty shoot-out scored) J. Staines

Sydney Olympic Park: Pitch 1
Umpires:
Timothy Sheahan (AUS)
Aidan Elliot (AUS)

8 July 2018
13:00

NSW (New South Wales)	3–3	(Tasmania) TAS
Hazell 20', 31', 36'	Report	Beltz 23'; Austin 53', 60'
Penalties
Hazell (penalty shoot-out missed); Lovett (penalty shoot-out missed); Farmilo (penalty shoot-out missed); Dillon (penalty shoot-out scored); Flack (penalty shoot-out missed)	1–2	(penalty shoot-out scored) Welch; (penalty shoot-out missed) Budgeon; (penalty shoot-out missed) Chapman; (penalty shoot-out scored) Beltz

Sydney Olympic Park: Pitch 2
Umpires:
Stirling Sharpe (AUS)
Jordan Moore (AUS)

8 July 2018
16:00

WA (Western Australia)	3–1	(South Australia) SA
Bowen 28'; Green 35'; Vaitekenas 52'	Report	Nyrhinen 6'

Sydney Olympic Park: Pitch 1
Umpires:
Todd Gilroy (AUS)
Harley Schenk (AUS)

8 July 2018
17:00

VIC (Victoria (state))	1–0	(Queensland) QLD
Steffens 39'	Report

Sydney Olympic Park: Pitch 2
Umpires:
Nathan Jennings (AUS)
David Bridgford (AUS)

==== Fifth to eighth place classification ====
Crossover
10 July 2018
(New South Wales) NSW	6
(New South Wales) NSW B	0
10 July 2018
(Queensland) QLD	5
(South Australia) SA	1

Fifth place match
11 July 2018
(New South Wales) NSW	3 (2)
(Queensland) QLD (p.s.o)	3 (4)
Seventh place match
11 July 2018
(New South Wales) NSW B (p.s.o)	2 (3)
(South Australia) SA	2 (1)

===== Crossover =====
10 July 2018
08:30

NSW (New South Wales)	6–0	(New South Wales) NSW B
Lovett 7'; Farmilo 25', 43'; Hazell 28', 51'; Mayo 55'	Report

Sydney Olympic Park: Pitch 2
Umpires:
Aidan Elliot (AUS)
Harley Schenk (AUS)

10 July 2018
10:30

QLD (Queensland)	5–1	(South Australia) SA
Francis 2', 8'; Spry 34'; Fossey 39'; Anderson 51'	Report	Busiko 27'

Sydney Olympic Park: Pitch 2
Umpires:
Todd Gilroy (AUS)
Jordan Moore (AUS)

===== Seventh and eighth place =====
11 July 2018
07:50

NSW B (New South Wales)	2–2	(South Australia) SA
Gallagher 40', 46'	Report	Busiko 22'; Abbott 28'
Penalties
Pickering (penalty shoot-out missed); Hochman (penalty shoot-out scored); Walker (penalty shoot-out scored); Thomas (penalty shoot-out missed); Stahl (penalty shoot-out scored)	3–1	(penalty shoot-out missed) Whittaker; (penalty shoot-out scored) Abbott; (penalty shoot-out missed) Fry; (penalty shoot-out missed) Wells

Sydney Olympic Park: Pitch 2
Umpires:
David Bridgford (AUS)
Jordan Moore (AUS)

===== Fifth and sixth place =====
11 July 2018
12:10

NSW (New South Wales)	3–3	(Queensland) QLD
Dillon 15'; Miotto 22'; Hazell 36'	Report	Wotherspoon 5', 53'; Martin 33'
Penalties
Richards (penalty shoot-out scored); Dillon (penalty shoot-out missed); Lovett (penalty shoot-out scored); Hazell (penalty shoot-out missed)	2–4	(penalty shoot-out scored) Francis; (penalty shoot-out scored) Wotherspoon; (penalty shoot-out missed) Anderson; (penalty shoot-out scored) Buckley; (penalty shoot-out scored) Spry

Sydney Olympic Park: Pitch 2
Umpires:
Aidan Elliot (AUS)
Stirling Sharpe (AUS)

==== First to fourth place classification ====
===== Semi-finals =====
10 July 2018
12:00

TAS (Tasmania)	4–3	(Australian Capital Territory) ACT
Welch 6', 27', 51'; Beltz 28'	Report	N. Gupte 20'; J. Staines 26'; Knight 60'

Sydney Olympic Park: Pitch 1
Umpires:
Timothy Sheahan (AUS)
Nathan Jennings (AUS)

10 July 2018
14:00

VIC (Victoria (state))	5–1	(Western Australia) WA
Steffens 27', 43', 44'; Hendry 49'; Coates 58'	Report	Green 12'

Sydney Olympic Park: Pitch 1
Umpires:
Stirling Sharpe (AUS)
David Bridgford (AUS)

===== Third and fourth place =====
11 July 2018
10:10

ACT (Australian Capital Territory)	1–3	(Western Australia) WA
N. Gupte 55'	Report	Puzey 34'; Flynn 41'; Bowen 48'

Sydney Olympic Park: Pitch 1
Umpires:
Harley Schenk (AUS)
Todd Gilroy (AUS)

===== Final =====
11 July 2018
14:30

TAS (Tasmania)	1–1	(Victoria (state)) VIC
Welch 37'	Report	Ephraums 19'
Penalties
Welch (penalty shoot-out missed); McCulloch (penalty shoot-out missed); Gill (penalty shoot-out scored); Beltz (penalty shoot-out scored); Smith (penalty shoot-out scored)	3–2	(penalty shoot-out scored) Ephraums; (penalty shoot-out missed) Hendry; (penalty shoot-out scored) Mulder; (penalty shoot-out missed) Steffens; (penalty shoot-out missed) Bretherton

Sydney Olympic Park: Pitch 1
Umpires:
Timothy Sheahan (AUS)
Nathan Jennings (AUS)

== Statistics ==
=== Final standings ===
Pos	Team	Pld	W	D	L	GF	GA	GD	Pts	Final Result
1st place, gold medalist(s)	(Tasmania) TAS	6	1	2	3	12	18	−6	5	Gold Medal
2nd place, silver medalist(s)	(Victoria (state)) VIC	6	4	1	1	14	8	+6	13	Silver Medal
3rd place, bronze medalist(s)	(Western Australia) WA	6	4	0	2	14	11	+3	12	Bronze Medal
4	(Australian Capital Territory) ACT	6	2	1	3	13	17	−4	7	Fourth Place
5	(Queensland) QLD	6	3	1	2	16	12	+4	10	Fifth Place
6	(New South Wales) NSW	6	3	2	1	18	8	+10	11	Sixth Place
7	(New South Wales) NSW B	6	2	2	2	11	14	−3	8	Seventh Place
8	(South Australia) SA	6	0	1	5	9	19	−10	1	Eighth Place

Source: Hockey Australia

=== Goalscorers ===
There were 107 goals scored in 24 matches, for an average of 4.46 goals per match.

7 goals

- (Australian Capital Territory) Niranjan Gupte
- (New South Wales) Ehren Hazell

6 goals

- (Victoria (state)) Damon Steffens

4 goals

- (Australian Capital Territory) Aaron Knight
- (New South Wales) Isaac Farmilo
- (New South Wales) Rhiley Carr (NSW B)
- (South Australia) Lachlan Busiko
- (Tasmania) Jack Welch

3 goals

- (New South Wales) Thomas Miotto
- (New South Wales) Brinley Gallagher (NSW B)
- (Queensland) Jacob Anderson
- (Queensland) Liam Hart
- (Queensland) Blake Wotherspoon
- (Tasmania) Hayden Beltz
- (Tasmania) Samuel McCulloch
- (Victoria (state)) Nathan Ephraums
- (Western Australia) Liam Flynn
- (Western Australia) Coby Green

2 goals

- (New South Wales) Joshua Mayo
- (New South Wales) Thomas Dolby (NSW B)
- (Queensland) Michael Francis
- (South Australia) Zac Nyrhinen
- (Tasmania) Benjamin Austin
- (Victoria (state)) Max Hendry
- (Western Australia) Joshua Bowen
- (Western Australia) Alec Rasmussen

1 goal

- (Australian Capital Territory) Lewis McLennan
- (Australian Capital Territory) Jake Staines
- (New South Wales) Hayden Dillon
- (New South Wales) Kurt Lovett
- (New South Wales) Cooper Stahl (NSW B)
- (New South Wales) Jake Wigham (NSW B)
- (Queensland) Douglas Buckley
- (Queensland) Lewis Fossey
- (Queensland) Reagan Martin
- (Queensland) Tyler Spry
- (Queensland) Samuel Young
- (South Australia) William Abbott
- (South Australia) Max Menadue
- (South Australia) Simon Wells
- (Victoria (state)) Patrick Coates
- (Victoria (state)) Casey Henderson
- (Victoria (state)) Hugh Snowden
- (Western Australia) Dane Gavranich
- (Western Australia) Tom Harvie
- (Western Australia) Marshall Puzey
- (Western Australia) Hayden Vaitekenas

Source: Hockey Australia
