= 2019 Under 21 Men's Australian Hockey Championships =

Tournament details
- Host country: Australia
- City: Lismore
- Teams: 8
- Venue(s): Lismore Hockey Centre

Final positions
- Champions: (New South Wales) NSW
- Runner-up: (Victoria (state)) VIC
- Third place: (Western Australia) WA

Tournament statistics
- Matches played: 24
- Goals scored: 136 (5.67 per match)
- Top scorer(s): (Victoria (state)) Patrick Coates (11 goals)

The 2019 Men's Under 21 Australian Hockey Championships is a field hockey tournament being held in the New South Wales city of Lismore from 10–17 July 2019.

== Competition format ==
The tournament is divided into two pools, Pool A and Pool B, consisting of four teams in a round robin format. At the conclusion of the pool stage, teams progress to the quarterfinals, where the winners progress to contest the medals, while the losing teams playoff for fifth to eighth place.

== Teams ==
- (Australian Capital Territory) ACT
- (New South Wales) NSW
- (New South Wales) NSW B
- (Queensland) QLD
- (South Australia) SA
- (Tasmania) TAS
- (Victoria (state)) VIC
- (Western Australia) WA

== Results ==
=== Preliminary round ===
==== Pool A ====
Pos	Team	Pld	W	D	L	GF	GA	GD	Pts
1	(Western Australia) WA	3	2	1	0	9	4	+5	7
2	(Queensland) QLD	3	1	2	0	9	5	+4	5
3	(New South Wales) NSW B	3	1	0	2	3	9	−6	3
4	(Tasmania) TAS	3	0	1	2	5	8	−3	1

Source: Hockey Australia

10 July 2019
11:00

TAS (Tasmania)	3–3	(Queensland) QLD
McCulloch 35', 37', 40'	Report	Harding 8'; Sandor 10'; Farrell 59'

Umpires:
Jordan Moore (AUS)
Timothy Sheahan (AUS)

10 July 2019
13:00

WA (Western Australia)	4–1	(New South Wales) NSW B
Murray 27'; Harvie 31', 34'; Gavranich 47'	Report	Stahl 49'

Umpires:
James Unkles (AUS)
Kenta Ujiie (JPN)

11 July 2019
10:00

QLD (Queensland)	4–0	(New South Wales) NSW B
Sandor 9'; Doan 21'; Hart 30'; Easton 39'	Report

Umpires:
Jayden Pearson (AUS)
Matthew Claxton (AUS)

11 July 2019
12:00

WA (Western Australia)	3–1	(Tasmania) TAS
Farmer 20'; Gavranich 38'; Murray 39'	Report	McCulloch 8'

Umpires:
Aaron Gotting (AUS)
Timothy Sheahan (AUS)

13 July 2019
13:30

TAS (Tasmania)	1–2	(New South Wales) NSW B
Smith 8'	Report	Davis 14', 42'

Umpires:
Kenta Ujiie (JPN)
Bailey Davis (AUS)

13 July 2019
15:30

QLD (Queensland)	2–2	(Western Australia) WA
Brown 24'; Sandor 32'	Report	Harvie 45'; Battistessa 55'

Umpires:
Timothy Sheahan (AUS)
James Unkles (AUS)

==== Pool B ====
Pos	Team	Pld	W	D	L	GF	GA	GD	Pts
1	(New South Wales) NSW	3	3	0	0	15	5	+10	9
2	(Victoria (state)) VIC	3	2	0	1	14	9	+5	6
3	(South Australia) SA	3	1	0	2	6	11	−5	3
4	(Australian Capital Territory) ACT	3	0	0	3	6	16	−10	0

Source: Hockey Australia

10 July 2019
15:00

VIC (Victoria (state))	3–4	(New South Wales) NSW
Ephraums 9'; Rennie 54'; Coates 55'	Report	Richards 2'; Mudford 10'; Walker 35'; Gallagher 56'

Umpires:
Matthew Claxton (AUS)
Bailey Davis (AUS)

10 July 2019
17:00

ACT (Australian Capital Territory)	2–3	(South Australia) SA
Knight 15', 34'	Report	Busiko 18', 57'; Mudford 48'

Umpires:
Jayden Pearson (AUS)
Aaron Gotting (AUS)

11 July 2019
14:00

ACT (Australian Capital Territory)	4–5	(Victoria (state)) VIC
McGregor 15'; Knight 25'; Goradia 27'; Gupte 58'	Report	Coates 2', 47'; Snowden 14'; Ephraums 46'; C. Marais 49'

Umpires:
Kenta Ujiie (JPN)
Jordan Moore (AUS)

11 July 2019
16:00

NSW (New South Wales)	3–2	(South Australia) SA
Gray 42'; Martin 49'; Willott 60'	Report	Menadue 3'; Wells 19'

Umpires:
James Unkles (AUS)
Bailey Davis (AUS)

13 July 2019
09:30

VIC (Victoria (state))	6–1	(South Australia) SA
Coates 2', 15'; Henderson 22'; Rennie 38', 39'; Bretherton 49'	Report	Busiko 10'

Umpires:
Aaron Gotting (AUS)
Jayden Pearson (AUS)

13 July 2019
11:30

NSW (New South Wales)	8–0	(Australian Capital Territory) ACT
Dolby 5'; Walker 8'; Mudford 19', 21'; Gray 30', 32'; Willott 45'; Richards 48'	Report

Umpires:
Jordan Moore (AUS)
Stephen Rogers (AUS)

=== Classification round ===
Quarter-finals
14 July 2019
(Western Australia) WA	5
(Australian Capital Territory) ACT	3
14 July 2019
(Victoria (state)) VIC	4
(New South Wales) NSW B	2
14 July 2019
(Queensland) QLD	1
(South Australia) SA	2
14 July 2019
(New South Wales) NSW	6
(Tasmania) TAS	0

Semi-finals
16 July 2019
(Western Australia) WA	4
(Victoria (state)) VIC	5
16 July 2019
(South Australia) SA	1
(New South Wales) NSW	6

Final
17 July 2019
(Victoria (state)) VIC	1
(New South Wales) NSW	2
Third place match
17 July 2019
(Western Australia) WA	4
(South Australia) SA	0

==== Quarter-finals ====
14 July 2019
11:30

WA (Western Australia)	5–3	(Australian Capital Territory) ACT
Gavranich 29', 34', 45'; Harvie 46'; King 60'	Report	Whitaker 47', 49'; Knight 53'

Umpires:
Timothy Sheahan (AUS)
Bailey Davis (AUS)

14 July 2019
13:30

QLD (Queensland)	1–2	(South Australia) SA
Arundell 15'	Report	Wells 23'; Gray 54'

Umpires:
Stephen Rogers (AUS)
Jayden Pearson (AUS)

14 July 2019
15:30

VIC (Victoria (state))	4–2	(New South Wales) NSW B
Coates 11', 14', 28'; Rennie 33'	Report	Wright 25'; Davis 49'

Umpires:
Aaron Gotting (AUS)
Jordan Moore (AUS)

14 July 2019
17:30

NSW (New South Wales)	6–0	(Tasmania) TAS
Richards 1'; Walker 8', 29', 37'; Gallagher 21', 55'	Report

Umpires:
James Unkles (AUS)
Kenta Ujiie (JPN)

==== Fifth to eighth place classification ====
Crossover
16 July 2019
(Australian Capital Territory) ACT	2
(New South Wales) NSW B	5
16 July 2019
(Queensland) QLD	4
(Tasmania) TAS	2

Fifth place match
17 July 2019
(New South Wales) NSW B	0
(Queensland) QLD	4
Seventh place match
17 July 2019
(Australian Capital Territory) ACT	1
(Tasmania) TAS	5

===== Crossover =====
16 July 2019
09:30

ACT (Australian Capital Territory)	2–5	(New South Wales) NSW B
Knight 6', 50'	Report	Smith 1', 25'; Davis 22'; Orth 47'; Dorman 60'

Umpires:
Kenta Ujiie (JPN)
Aaron Gotting (AUS)

16 July 2019
09:30

QLD (Queensland)	4–2	(Tasmania) TAS
Francis 15'; Sandor 25'; Fossey 41'; Hart 58'	Report	McCarthy 18'; Brooks 46'

Umpires:
Bailey Davis (AUS)
Jordan Moore (AUS)

===== Seventh and eighth place =====
17 July 2019
08:50

ACT (Australian Capital Territory)	1–5	(Tasmania) TAS
Knight 15'	Report	McCulloch 3', 54'; McCarthy 33'; Bessell 52'; Wilkinson 59'

Umpires:
Kenta Ujiie (JPN)
Bailey Davis (AUS)

===== Fifth and sixth place =====
17 July 2019
13:10

NSW B (New South Wales)	0–4	(Queensland) QLD
	Report	Prest 40'; Brown 41'; Fossey 60'; Sandor 60'

Umpires:
Timothy Sheahan (AUS)
Jordan Moore (AUS)

==== First to fourth place classification ====
===== Semi-finals =====
16 July 2019
13:00

WA (Western Australia)	4–5	(Victoria (state)) VIC
Sampson 40'; King 43'; Harvie 55'; Murray 56'	Report	Coates 7', 33', 55'; Hendry 46'; Ephraums 50'

Umpires:
Matthew Claxton (AUS)
Jayden Pearson (AUS)

16 July 2019
15:00

SA (South Australia)	1–6	(New South Wales) NSW
Busiko 28'	Report	Wigham 5'; Gallagher 36'; Willott 44'; Mackay 46'; Walker 57'; Dolby 58'

Umpires:
Timothy Sheahan (AUS)
James Unkles (AUS)

===== Third and fourth place =====
17 July 2019
11:10

WA (Western Australia)	4–0	(South Australia) SA
Harvie 14', 18'; Farmer 24'; Battistessa 50'	Report

Umpires:
Matthew Claxton (AUS)
Aaron Gotting (AUS)

===== Final =====
17 July 2019
15:30

VIC (Victoria (state))	1–2	(New South Wales) NSW
Marais 15'	Report	Gray 27'; Willott 35'

Umpires:
James Unkles (AUS)
Jayden Pearson (AUS)
