= 2017 Under 21 Men's Australian Hockey Championships =

Australian under-21 field hockey tournament

Tournament details
- Host country: Australia
- City: Wollongong
- Teams: 8
- Venue: Illawarra Hockey Stadium

Final positions
- Champions: (New South Wales) NSW
- Runner-up: (Queensland) QLD
- Third place: (Western Australia) WA

Tournament statistics
- Matches played: 24
- Goals scored: 130 (5.42 per match)
- Top scorer: (Western Australia) Liam Flynn (11 goals)

The 2017 Men's Under 21 Australian Hockey Championships was a men's field hockey tournament held in the New South Wales city of Wollongong between 7–14 July 2017.

== Competition format ==
The tournament is divided into two pools, Pool A and Pool B, consisting of four teams in a round robin format. Teams then progress into either Pool C, the medal round, or Pool D, the classification round. Teams carry over points from their previous match ups, and contest teams they are yet to play.

The top two teams in each of pools A and B then progress to Pool C. The top two teams in Pool C continue to contest the Final, while the bottom two teams of Pool C play in the Third and Fourth place match.

The remaining bottom placing teams make up Pool D. The top two teams in Pool D play in the Fifth and Sixth place match, while the bottom two teams of Pool C play in the Seventh and Eighth place match.

== Teams ==
- Australian Capital Territory
- New South Wales
- Northern Territory
- Queensland
- South Australia
- Tasmania
- (Victoria (state)) Victoria
- Western Australia

== Results ==
=== First round ===
==== Pool A ====
Pos	Team	Pld	W	D	L	GF	GA	GD	Pts	Qualification
1	(Victoria (state)) VIC	3	3	0	0	18	5	+13	9	Advance to medal round
2	(Western Australia) WA	3	2	0	1	11	4	+7	6	Advance to medal round
3	(Australian Capital Territory) ACT	3	1	0	2	8	11	−3	3	Advance to 5th–8th classification
4	(Northern Territory) NT	3	0	0	3	1	18	−17	0	Advance to 5th–8th classification

Source: Hockey Australia

7 July 2017
12:00

VIC (Victoria (state))	7–3	(Australian Capital Territory) ACT
Scanlon 5', 41', 51'; Steffens 9'; Meaden 41'; Hendry 44'; Rennie 56'	Report	McLennan 22'; J. Staines 38'; Yoshikawa 60'

Illawarra Hockey Stadium
Umpires:
Aaron Gotting (AUS)
Andrew Brown (AUS)

7 July 2017
14:00

WA (Western Australia)	6–0	(Northern Territory) NT
Flynn 14', 49', 50', 56'; De Bes 18'; Gavranich 20'	Report

Illawarra Hockey Stadium
Umpires:
Hideyuki Takahashi (JPN)
Timothy Sheahan (AUS)

8 July 2017
13:00

ACT (Australian Capital Territory)	5–1	(Northern Territory) NT
Gupte 13'; Walker 23'; Knight 33'; McLennan 35'; B. Staines 48'	Report	Carr 48'

Illawarra Hockey Stadium
Umpires:
Andrew Brown (AUS)
Hari Silvarajoo (SIN)

8 July 2017
15:00

WA (Western Australia)	2–4	(Victoria (state)) VIC
Flynn 23', 56'	Report	Steffens 15', 58'; Scanlon 35'; Ephraums 48'

Illawarra Hockey Stadium
Umpires:
Aaron Gotting (AUS)
Stirling Sharpe (AUS)

10 July 2017
15:00

VIC (Victoria (state))	7–0	(Northern Territory) NT
Ephraums 13', 47'; Steffens 23'; Rennie 32', 45'; Parry 37'; Stock 48'	Report

Illawarra Hockey Stadium
Umpires:
Harley Schenk (AUS)
Jayden Pearson (AUS)

10 July 2017
17:00

ACT (Australian Capital Territory)	0–3	(Western Australia) WA
	Report	Harvie 39'; Gerrard 45'; Flynn 60'

Illawarra Hockey Stadium
Umpires:
Andrew Brown (AUS)
Hideyuki Takahashi (JPN)

==== Pool B ====
Pos	Team	Pld	W	D	L	GF	GA	GD	Pts	Qualification
1	(New South Wales) NSW	3	3	0	0	23	5	+18	9	Advance to medal round
2	(Queensland) QLD	3	2	0	1	13	7	+6	6	Advance to medal round
3	(Tasmania) TAS	3	1	0	2	6	16	−10	3	Advance to 5th–8th classification
4	(South Australia) SA	3	0	0	3	3	17	−14	0	Advance to 5th–8th classification

Source: Hockey Australia

7 July 2017
16:00

NSW (New South Wales)	8–1	(Tasmania) TAS
Farmilo 8'; Govers 11'; Miotto 27'; Brand 28'; Hazell 29', 31'; Stewart 58'; Mayo 60+'	Report	Beltz 38'

Illawarra Hockey Stadium
Umpires:
Stirling Sharpe (AUS)
Aidan Elliot (AUS)

7 July 2017
18:00

QLD (Queensland)	3–1	(South Australia) SA
Weyer 12', 30'; Hughes 14'	Report	Willson 47'

Illawarra Hockey Stadium
Umpires:
Jayden Pearson (AUS)
Ben Hocking (AUS)

8 July 2017
17:00

QLD (Queensland)	3–4	(New South Wales) NSW
Rintala 18', 31'; Harding 28'	Report	Farmilo 3'; Miotto 30'; Govers 42'; Sharp 57'

Illawarra Hockey Stadium
Umpires:
Aidan Elliot (AUS)
Ben Hocking (AUS)

8 July 2017
19:00

TAS (Tasmania)	3–1	(South Australia) SA
Welch 2', 54'; Beckett 11'	Report	Powardy 60'

Illawarra Hockey Stadium
Umpires:
Hideyuki Takahashi (JPN)
Harley Schenk (AUS)

10 July 2017
11:00

NSW (New South Wales)	11–1	(South Australia) SA
Farmilo 2', 29', 29', 51'; Hazell 17', 40'; Miotto 22', 31'; Lovett 28'; Govers 55'; Stewart 58'	Report	Willson 39'

Illawarra Hockey Stadium
Umpires:
Timothy Sheahan (AUS)
Ben Hocking (AUS)

10 July 2017
13:00

TAS (Tasmania)	2–7	(Queensland) QLD
Gill 28'; Welch 32'	Report	Hughes 5', 16', 60'; Weyer 7'; Rintala 20'; Harding 32'; Springfield 51'

Illawarra Hockey Stadium
Umpires:
Hari Silvarajoo (SIN)
Stirling Sharpe (AUS)

=== Second round ===
==== Pool C (medal round) ====
Pos	Team	Pld	W	D	L	GF	GA	GD	Pts
1	(New South Wales) NSW	3	3	0	0	8	5	+3	9
2	(Queensland) QLD	3	1	0	2	8	9	−1	3
3	(Victoria (state)) VIC	3	1	0	2	7	8	−1	3
4	(Western Australia) WA	3	1	0	2	6	7	−1	3

Source: Hockey Australia

11 July 2017
12:00

VIC (Victoria (state))	2–4	(Queensland) QLD
Ephraums 1'; Meaden 56'	Report	Rintala 23', 57'; Crane 32'; Harding 57'

Illawarra Hockey Stadium
Umpires:
Andrew Brown (AUS)
Jayden Pearson (AUS)

11 July 2017
16:00

NSW (New South Wales)	2–1	(Western Australia) WA
Sharp 28', 40'	Report	Flynn 15'

Illawarra Hockey Stadium
Umpires:
Aaron Gotting (AUS)
Ben Hocking (AUS)

13 July 2017
12:00

VIC (Victoria (state))	1–2	(New South Wales) NSW
Hendry 48'	Report	Sharp 2'; Brand 39'

Illawarra Hockey Stadium
Umpires:
Hari Silvarajoo (SIN)
Aaron Gotting (AUS)

13 July 2017
16:00

WA (Western Australia)	3–1	(Queensland) QLD
Flynn 44', 50'; Green 48'	Report	Young 41'

Illawarra Hockey Stadium
Umpires:
Hideyuki Takahashi (JPN)
Ben Hocking (AUS)

==== Pool D (classification round) ====
Pos	Team	Pld	W	D	L	GF	GA	GD	Pts
1	(Tasmania) TAS	3	2	0	1	5	4	+1	6
2	(Australian Capital Territory) ACT	3	1	1	1	9	6	+3	4
3	(South Australia) SA	3	1	1	1	6	7	−1	4
4	(Northern Territory) NT	3	1	0	2	4	7	−3	3

11 July 2017
11:00

ACT (Australian Capital Territory)	3–3	(South Australia) SA
Walker 26'; Carr 33'; Knight 39'	Report	Willson 11'; Busiko 44'; Larwood 48'

Illawarra Hockey Stadium
Umpires:
Aidan Elliot (AUS)
Harley Schenk (AUS)

11 July 2017
15:00

TAS (Tasmania)	0–2	(Northern Territory) NT
	Report	Hullick 28'; Dale 29'

Illawarra Hockey Stadium
Umpires:
Stirling Sharpe (AUS)
Hari Silvarajoo (SIN)

13 July 2017
11:00

ACT (Australian Capital Territory)	1–2	(Tasmania) TAS
B. Staines 2'	Report	Austin 14', 22'

Illawarra Hockey Stadium
Umpires:
Aidan Elliot (AUS)
Timothy Sheahan (AUS)

13 July 2017
15:00

NT (Northern Territory)	1–2	(South Australia) SA
Hochman 26'	Report	Evans 47'; Abbott 51'

Illawarra Hockey Stadium
Umpires:
Jayden Pearson (AUS)
Harley Schenk (AUS)

=== Classification matches ===
==== Seventh and eighth place ====
14 July 2017
09:00

SA (South Australia)	1–4	(Northern Territory) NT
Busiko 41'	Report	Andrade 21'; Nyrhinen 22', 26'; Hochman 47'

Illawarra Hockey Stadium
Umpires:
Aaron Gotting (AUS)
Stirling Sharpe (AUS)

==== Fifth and sixth place ====
14 July 2017
15:00

TAS (Tasmania)	1–2	(Australian Capital Territory) ACT
Popowski 13'	Report	B. Staines 21'; Neeson 30+'

Illawarra Hockey Stadium
Umpires:
Harley Schenk (AUS)
Timothy Sheahan (AUS)

==== Third and fourth place ====
14 July 2017
11:15

VIC (Victoria (state))	1–1	(Western Australia) WA
Steffens 44'	Report	Flynn 50'
Penalties
Hendry (penalty shoot-out missed); Allan (penalty shoot-out missed); Scanlon (penalty shoot-out scored); Ephraums (penalty shoot-out missed)	1–3	(penalty shoot-out scored) Harvie; (penalty shoot-out missed) Flynn; (penalty shoot-out scored) Green; (penalty shoot-out scored) Fraser

Illawarra Hockey Stadium
Umpires:
Andrew Brown (AUS)
Jayden Pearson (AUS)

==== Final ====
14 July 2017
15:45

NSW (New South Wales)	4–3	(Queensland) QLD
Govers 2', 18'; Farmilo 25'; Stewart 39'	Report	Rintala 37'; Anderson 41'; Weyer 60'

Illawarra Hockey Stadium
Umpires:
Hari Silvarajoo (SIN)
Ben Hocking (AUS)

== Statistics ==
=== Final standings ===
Pos	Team	Pld	W	D	L	GF	GA	GD	Pts	Final result
1st place, gold medalist(s)	(New South Wales) NSW	6	6	0	0	31	10	+21	18	Gold medal
2nd place, silver medalist(s)	(Queensland) QLD	6	3	0	3	21	16	+5	9	Silver medal
3rd place, bronze medalist(s)	(Western Australia) WA	6	3	1	2	16	8	+8	10	Bronze medal
4	(Victoria (state)) VIC	6	3	1	2	22	12	+10	10	Fourth place
5	(Australian Capital Territory) ACT	6	2	1	3	14	17	−3	7	Fifth place
6	(Tasmania) TAS	6	2	0	4	9	21	−12	6	Sixth place
7	(Northern Territory) NT	6	2	0	4	8	21	−13	6	Seventh place
8	(South Australia) SA	6	1	1	4	9	25	−16	4	Eighth place

Source: Hockey Australia

=== Goalscorers ===
There were 130 goals scored in 24 matches, for an average of 5.42 goals per match.

11 goals

- (Western Australia) Liam Flynn

7 goals

- (New South Wales) Isaac Farmilo

6 goals

- (Queensland) Joel Rintala

5 goals

- (New South Wales) Blake Govers
- (Victoria (state)) Damon Steffens

4 goals

- (New South Wales) Ehren Hazell
- (New South Wales) Thomas Miotto
- (New South Wales) Lachlan Sharp
- (Queensland) Bradley Hughes
- (Queensland) Corey Weyer
- (Victoria (state)) Nathan Ephraums
- (Victoria (state)) Andrew Scanlon

3 goals

- (Australian Capital Territory) Benjamin Staines
- (New South Wales) Nathanael Stewart
- (Queensland) Max Harding
- (South Australia) Kurtis Willson
- (Tasmania) Jack Welch
- (Victoria (state)) Benjamin Rennie

2 goals

- (Australian Capital Territory) Aaron Knight
- (Australian Capital Territory) Lewis McLennan
- (Australian Capital Territory) Rory Walker
- (New South Wales) Timothy Brand
- (Northern Territory) Nathan Hochman
- (Northern Territory) Zac Nyrhinen
- (South Australia) Lachlan Busiko
- (Tasmania) Benjamin Austin
- (Victoria (state)) Max Hendry
- (Victoria (state)) Zachary Meaden

1 goal

- (Australian Capital Territory) Rhiley Carr
- (Australian Capital Territory) Niranjan Gupte
- (Australian Capital Territory) Matthew Neeson
- (Australian Capital Territory) Jake Staines
- (Australian Capital Territory) Daichi Yoshikawa
- (New South Wales) Kurt Lovett
- (New South Wales) Joshua Mayo
- (Northern Territory) Jacob Andrade
- (Northern Territory) Lain Carr
- (Northern Territory) Elliott Dale
- (Northern Territory) Jason Hullick
- (Queensland) Jacob Anderson
- (Queensland) Oliver Crane
- (Queensland) Daniel Springfield
- (Queensland) Samuel Young
- (South Australia) William Abbott
- (South Australia) Jacob Evans
- (South Australia) Luke Larwood
- (South Australia) Cooper Powardy
- (Tasmania) Samuel Beckett
- (Tasmania) Hayden Beltz
- (Tasmania) Gobrindaj Gill
- (Tasmania) Keegan Popowski
- (Victoria (state)) Ryan Parry
- (Victoria (state)) Lachlan Stock
- (Western Australia) Bryn de Bes
- (Western Australia) Dane Gavranich
- (Western Australia) Frazer Gerrard
- (Western Australia) Coby Green
- (Western Australia) Jake Harvie

Source: Hockey Australia
