= 2016 Under 21 Men's Australian Hockey Championships =

2016 Men's Under 21 Australian Hockey Championships
Tournament details
- Host country: Australia
- City: Sydney
- Teams: 8
- Venue(s): Sydney Olympic Park

Final positions
- Champions: (Victoria (state)) Victoria
- Runner-up: New South Wales
- Third place: Queensland

Tournament statistics
- Matches played: 24
- Goals scored: 117 (4.88 per match)
- Top scorer(s): (Victoria (state)) Andrew Scanlon (6 goals)

The 2016 Men's Under 21 Australian Hockey Championships was a men's Field Hockey tournament held in the New South Wales city of Sydney.

The Victoria Under 21 team won the gold medal after defeating the New South Wales Under 21 team 2–0 in the final. Queensland won the bronze medal by defeating Victoria 4–3 in the third and fourth playoff.

== Competition format ==
The tournament is divided into two pools, Pool A and Pool B, consisting of four teams in a round robin format. Teams then progress into either Pool C, the medal round, or Pool D, the classification round. Teams carry over points from their previous match ups, and contest teams they are yet to play.

The top two teams in each of pools A and B then progress to Pool C. The top two teams in Pool C continue to contest the Final, while the bottom two teams of Pool C play in the Third and Fourth place match.

The remaining bottom placing teams make up Pool D. The top two teams in Pool D play in the Fifth and Sixth place match, while the bottom two teams of Pool C play in the Seventh and Eighth place match.

== Teams ==
- Australian Capital Territory
- New South Wales
- Northern Territory
- Queensland
- South Australia
- Tasmania
- (Victoria (state)) Victoria
- Western Australia

== Results ==
=== First round ===
==== Pool A ====
Pos	Team	Pld	W	D	L	GF	GA	GD	Pts	Qualification
1	(Victoria (state)) VIC	3	2	1	0	17	4	+13	7	Advance to medal round
2	(Queensland) QLD	3	2	1	0	10	2	+8	7	Advance to medal round
3	(Tasmania) TAS	3	1	0	2	7	13	−6	3	Advance to 5th–8th classification
4	(Northern Territory) NT	3	0	0	3	3	18	−15	0	Advance to 5th–8th classification

10 April 2016
10:30

VIC (Victoria (state))	9–0	(Northern Territory) NT
Arunasalam 17'; Scanlon 19', 30', 58'; Ephraums 32'; Bretherton 44'; Hendry 47'; McBride 51'; Allan 52'	Report

Sydney Olympic Park
Umpires:
Zeke Newman (AUS)
Andrew Brown (AUS)

10 April 2016
12:30

QLD (Queensland)	4–0	(Tasmania) TAS
Piggin 9'; Hughes 21'; Howard 42'; Baldwin 43'	Report

Sydney Olympic Park
Umpires:
Ben Hocking (AUS)
Jordan Glover (AUS)

11 April 2016
10:00

QLD (Queensland)	4–0	(Northern Territory) NT
Rintala 9'; Weyer 24'; Piggin 39'; Crane 54'	Report

Sydney Olympic Park
Umpires:
Jordan Glover (AUS)
Ben Hocking (AUS)

11 April 2016
12:00

VIC (Victoria (state))	6–2	(Tasmania) TAS
Allan 10', 25'; Simmonds 28'; Arunasalam 30'; Ephraums 31'; O'Shea 36'	Report	Beltz 12'; Walker-Kidd 39'

Sydney Olympic Park
Umpires:
Andrew Brown (AUS)
Carl Mueller (AUS)

13 April 2016
10:30

TAS (Tasmania)	5–3	(Northern Territory) NT
White 6', 14', 44'; Smith 10'; Walker-Kidd 47'	Report	Andrade 5'; Vaitekenas 10'; Edgar 51'

Sydney Olympic Park
Umpires:
Stirling Sharpe (AUS)
William Brukner (AUS)

13 April 2016
14:30

VIC (Victoria (state))	2–2	(Queensland) QLD
Simmonds 14'; Hendry 31'	Report	Rintala 7', 39'

Sydney Olympic Park
Umpires:
Andrew Brown (AUS)
David Bridgford (AUS)

==== Pool B ====
Pos	Team	Pld	W	D	L	GF	GA	GD	Pts	Qualification
1	(New South Wales) NSW	3	2	1	0	11	7	+4	7	Advance to medal round
2	(Western Australia) WA	3	1	1	1	8	6	+2	4	Advance to medal round
3	(Australian Capital Territory) ACT	3	1	1	1	6	9	−3	4	Advance to 5th–8th classification
4	(South Australia) SA	3	0	1	2	6	9	−3	1	Advance to 5th–8th classification

10 April 2016
14:30

NSW (New South Wales)	4–3	(South Australia) SA
Brand 19'; Lovett 38'; Butterick 48'; Miotto 57'	Report	Willson 36', 59'; Mitton 45'

Sydney Olympic Park
Umpires:
William Brukner (AUS)
Carl Mueller (AUS)

10 April 2016
12:30

WA (Western Australia)	5–0	(Australian Capital Territory) ACT
Flynn 10'; Williams 29'; Gerrard 30'; Fisher 40'; Fraser 54'	Report

Sydney Olympic Park
Umpires:
Stephen Versteegh (AUS)
Aaron Gotting (AUS)

11 April 2016
14:00

WA (Western Australia)	1–1	(South Australia) SA
Benetti 6'	Report	Mitton 25'

Sydney Olympic Park
Umpires:
David Bridgford (AUS)
Zeke Newman (AUS)

11 April 2016
12:00

NSW (New South Wales)	2–2	(Australian Capital Territory) ACT
Lovett 16'; Liles 52'	Report	Carr 12'; Gupte 41'

Sydney Olympic Park
Umpires:
William Brukner (AUS)
Stephen Versteegh (AUS)

13 April 2016
12:30

SA (South Australia)	2–4	(Australian Capital Territory) ACT
Busiko 11'; Powardy 29'	Report	Gupte 15', 47'; Carr 19'; Deane 41'

Sydney Olympic Park
Umpires:
Stephen Versteegh (AUS)
Zeke Newman (AUS)

13 April 2016
16:30

WA (Western Australia)	2–5	(New South Wales) NSW
Benetti 19'; Bird 24'	Report	Miotto 3'; Boyle 15'; Liles 37'; Farmilo 37', 51'

Sydney Olympic Park
Umpires:
Aaron Gotting (AUS)
Jordan Glover (AUS)

=== Second round ===
==== Pool C (medal round) ====
Pos	Team	Pld	W	D	L	GF	GA	GD	Pts
1	(New South Wales) NSW	3	2	1	0	10	5	+5	7
2	(Victoria (state)) VIC	3	1	2	0	8	4	+4	5
3	(Queensland) QLD	3	1	1	1	5	6	−1	4
4	(Western Australia) WA	3	0	0	3	3	11	−8	0

14 April 2016
14:00

QLD (Queensland)	1–0	(Western Australia) WA
Rintala 57'	Report

Sydney Olympic Park
Umpires:
David Bridgford (AUS)
Andrew Brown (AUS)

14 April 2016
16:00

VIC (Victoria (state))	1–1	(New South Wales) NSW
Scanlon 38'	Report	Sharp 25'

Sydney Olympic Park
Umpires:
Carl Mueller (AUS)
Aaron Gotting (AUS)

16 April 2016
14:30

NSW (New South Wales)	4–2	(Queensland) QLD
Butterick 19'; Sharp 33'; Lovett 33'; Brand 47'	Report	Crane 13'; Anderson 29'

Sydney Olympic Park
Umpires:
Stephen Versteegh (AUS)
Aaron Gotting (AUS)

16 April 2016
16:30

VIC (Victoria (state))	5–1	(Western Australia) WA
Ephraums 11', 26'; Scanlon 14', 37'; Arunasalam 44'	Report	Fraser 52'

Sydney Olympic Park
Umpires:
Zeke Newman (AUS)
Andrew Brown (AUS)

==== Pool D (classification round) ====
Pos	Team	Pld	W	D	L	GF	GA	GD	Pts
1	(Tasmania) TAS	3	2	1	0	10	7	+3	7
2	(Australian Capital Territory) ACT	3	1	1	1	8	7	+1	4
3	(Northern Territory) NT	3	1	1	1	8	9	−1	4
4	(South Australia) SA	3	0	1	2	6	9	−3	1

14 April 2016
10:00

NT (Northern Territory)	3–2	(South Australia) SA
Andrade 12'; Rennie 41'; Hullick 48'	Report	Brown 5'; Busiko 26'

Sydney Olympic Park
Umpires:
Stirling Sharpe (AUS)
Ben Hocking (AUS)

14 April 2016
12:00

TAS (Tasmania)	3–2	(Australian Capital Territory) ACT
McCulloch 4'; Welch 15'; Beltz 39'	Report	Hopkins 49'; Knight 50'

Sydney Olympic Park
Umpires:
William Brukner (AUS)
Jordan Glover (AUS)

16 April 2016
10:30

ACT (Australian Capital Territory)	2–2	(Northern Territory) NT
Gupte 39', 60'	Report	Keal 45'; Hullick 57'

Sydney Olympic Park
Umpires:
Ben Hocking (AUS)
Carl Mueller (AUS)

16 April 2016
12:30

TAS (Tasmania)	2–2	(South Australia) SA
Beltz 27'; Smith 58'	Report	Willson 53', 60'

Sydney Olympic Park
Umpires:
Stirling Sharpe (AUS)
David Bridgford (AUS)

=== Classification matches ===
==== Seventh and eighth place ====
17 April 2016
09:00

NT (Northern Territory)	1–3	(South Australia) SA
Martin 26'	Report	Brown 11'; Willson 37'; Powardy 44'

Sydney Olympic Park
Umpires:
William Brukner (AUS)
Carl Mueller (AUS)

==== Fifth and sixth place ====
17 April 2016
12:00

TAS (Tasmania)	1–2	(Australian Capital Territory) ACT
Walker-Kidd 58'	Report	McLenna 28'; Hopkins 51'

Sydney Olympic Park
Umpires:
Andrew Brown (AUS)
Jordan Glover (AUS)

==== Third and fourth place ====
17 April 2016
13:30

QLD (Queensland)	4–3	(Western Australia) WA
Crane 23', 55'; Rintala 36'; Warne 57'	Report	Flynn 9'; Benetti 52'; Rasmussen 54'

Sydney Olympic Park
Umpires:
Stephen Versteegh (AUS)
Zeke Newman (AUS)

==== Final ====
17 April 2016
18:30

NSW (New South Wales)	0–2	(Victoria (state)) VIC
	Report	Ephraums 12'; Allan 34'

Sydney Olympic Park
Umpires:
David Bridgford (AUS)
Aaron Gotting (AUS)

== Statistics ==
=== Final standings ===
Pos	Team	Pld	W	D	L	GF	GA	GD	Pts	Final result
1st place, gold medalist(s)	(Victoria (state)) Victoria	6	4	2	0	25	6	+19	14	Gold medal
2nd place, silver medalist(s)	New South Wales	6	3	2	1	16	12	+4	11	Silver medal
3rd place, bronze medalist(s)	Queensland	6	4	1	1	17	9	+8	13	Bronze medal
4	Western Australia	6	1	1	4	12	16	−4	4	Fourth place
5	Australian Capital Territory	6	2	2	2	12	15	−3	8	Fifth place
6	Tasmania	6	2	1	3	13	19	−6	7	Sixth place
7	South Australia	6	1	2	3	13	15	−2	5	Seventh place
8	Northern Territory	6	1	1	4	9	25	−16	4	Eighth place
