= 2014 Under 21 Men's Australian Hockey Championships =

Field hockey tournament in Sydney

Tournament details
- Host country: Australia
- City: Sydney
- Teams: 7
- Venue: Sydney Olympic Park

Final positions
- Champions: New South Wales
- Runner-up: (Victoria (state)) Victoria
- Third place: Western Australia

Tournament statistics
- Matches played: 36
- Goals scored: 238 (6.61 per match)
- Top scorer: (New South Wales) Blake Govers (20 goals)

The 2014 Under 21 Men's Australian Hockey Championships was a men's field hockey tournament held in the New South Wales city of Sydney.

New South Wales won the gold medal after defeating Victoria 7–2 in the final. Western Australia won the bronze medal by defeating Queensland 3–0 in the third and fourth playoff.

== Competition format ==
The tournament is played in a round robin format, with each team facing each other once. Final placings after the pool matches determine playoffs.

The bottom four teams play in the classification round. Two crossover matches are played, with the fifth placed team playing the eighth place team and the fifth placed team facing the sixth placed team. The winners of the crossover matches progress to the fifth and sixth place playoff, while the losers contest the seventh and eighth place playoff.

The top four teams contest the medal round. Two semi-finals are played, with the first placed team taking on the fourth placed team and the second placed team taking on the third placed team. The winners progress to the final, while the losers contest the third and fourth place playoff.

== Teams ==
- (Australian Capital Territory) ACT
- (New South Wales) NSW
- (Northern Territory) NT
- (Queensland) QLD
- (South Australia) SA
- (Tasmania) TAS
- (Victoria (state)) VIC
- (Western Australia) WA

== Results ==
=== Pool matches ===
Pos	Team	Pld	W	D	L	GF	GA	GD	Pts	Qualification
1	(New South Wales) NSW	7	7	0	0	52	7	+45	21	Semi-Finals
2	(Queensland) QLD	7	6	0	1	24	10	+14	18	Semi-Finals
3	(Victoria (state)) VIC	7	5	0	2	24	17	+7	15	Semi-Finals
4	(Western Australia) WA	7	4	0	3	19	19	0	12	Semi-Finals
5	(Tasmania) TAS	7	2	1	4	21	25	−4	7	5th-8th
6	(Northern Territory) NT	7	2	1	4	11	29	−18	7	5th-8th
7	(Australian Capital Territory) ACT	7	1	0	6	21	35	−14	3	5th-8th
8	(South Australia) SA	7	0	0	7	11	41	−30	0	5th-8th

30 June 2014
09:00

QLD (Queensland)	8–1	(Northern Territory) NT
Kruger 15'; Bell 17'; Douglas 26'; Rintala 32', 70'; Howard 34'; Boyde 54'	Report	Parkin 61'

Sydney Olympic Park
Umpires:
Gilbert Gough-Fuller (AUS)
Scott O'Reilly (AUS)

30 June 2014
11:00

NSW (New South Wales)	5–0	(Western Australia) WA
Bourke 14'; McEwen 23'; Horner 32'; Elliott 34'; Ogilvie 45'	Report

Sydney Olympic Park
Umpires:
Jeremy Coleman (AUS)
James Unkles (AUS)

30 June 2014
13:00

VIC (Victoria (state))	4–2	(Tasmania) TAS
Hammond 8', 46'; Gilmour 29'; Stock 30'	Report	Arthur 45', 55'

Sydney Olympic Park
Umpires:
Zeke Newman (AUS)
Matthew Claxton (AUS)

30 June 2014
15:00

SA (South Australia)	1–6	(Australian Capital Territory) ACT
Scotcher 30'	Report	Day 9', 51'; Laidley 16', 56'; Rout 28'; Shepherd 70'

Sydney Olympic Park
Umpires:
Scott Embry (AUS)
Lee Nugawela (AUS)

1 July 2014
09:00

VIC (Victoria (state))	6–1	(Western Australia) WA
Scanlon 24'; Arunasalam 38', 49'; Simmonds 56'; Hammond 64'; Gilmour 70'	Report	Robertson 63'

Sydney Olympic Park
Umpires:
Zeke Newman (AUS)
Stirling Sharpe (AUS)

1 July 2014
11:00

TAS (Tasmania)	1–5	(Queensland) QLD
Blacklow 9'	Report	Rintala 3', 21', 42'; Bell 53'; Argent 59'

Sydney Olympic Park
Umpires:
Nicholas Marshall (AUS)
Gilbert Gough-Fuller (AUS)

1 July 2014
13:00

NT (Northern Territory)	5–3	(Australian Capital Territory) ACT
Lockley 13', 37'; Latham 23'; Platt 33', 46'	Report	Mosslar 5', 43'; Hopkins 20'

Sydney Olympic Park
Umpires:
Jeremy Coleman (AUS)
Matthew Claxton (AUS)

1 July 2014
15:00

NSW (New South Wales)	14–0	(South Australia) SA
McEwen 5', 30', 67'; Govers 10', 17', 23', 35', 43', 68'; Noblett 27'; Elliott 47', 64'; Horner 65'; Proctor 70'	Report

Sydney Olympic Park
Umpires:
Scott O'Reilly (AUS)
James Unkles (AUS)

2 July 2014
09:00

ACT (Australian Capital Territory)	3–7	(Tasmania) TAS
Hackett-Hansson 24'; Shepherd 28'; Laidley 54'	Report	White 4'; Arthur 13', 59'; Mackey 22', 34'; Johnston 67'; Crane 67'

Sydney Olympic Park
Umpires:
Scott O'Reilly (AUS)
Scott Embry (AUS)

2 July 2014
11:00

QLD (Queensland)	2–1	(Western Australia) WA
Rintala 17'; Howard 54'	Report	Benfell 35'

Sydney Olympic Park
Umpires:
Jeremy Coleman (AUS)
Gilbert Gough-Fuller (AUS)

2 July 2014
13:00

SA (South Australia)	3–4	(Victoria (state)) VIC
Browne 38'; Russ 54'; Pena 70'	Report	Page 27'; Scanlon 51'; Wookey 56'; Hammond 68'

Sydney Olympic Park
Umpires:
Stirling Sharpe (AUS)
Nicholas Marshall (AUS)

2 July 2014
15:00

NSW (New South Wales)	9–1	(Northern Territory) NT
Gregory 3'; Govers 16', 29', 33', 49'; Bourke 17'; Horner 34', 49'; Ogilvie 39'	Report	Sommerville 44'

Sydney Olympic Park
Umpires:
Matthew Claxton (AUS)
Lee Nugawela (AUS)

4 July 2014
09:00

NSW (New South Wales)	9–1	(Australian Capital Territory) ACT
Govers 17'; Bourke 29'; Elliott 40', 64'; McEwen 45', 58', 66'; Dawson 55'; Ogilvie 61'	Report	Laidley 60'

Sydney Olympic Park
Umpires:
Matthew Claxton (AUS)
Lee Nugawela (AUS)

4 July 2014
11:00

QLD (Queensland)	3–1	(Victoria (state)) VIC
Wotherspoon 14'; Boyde 30'; Mynott 57'	Report	Hammond 25'

Sydney Olympic Park
Umpires:
Stirling Sharpe (AUS)
Scott Embry (AUS)

4 July 2014
13:00

TAS (Tasmania)	0–2	(Western Australia) WA
	Report	Gerrard 51'; Robertson 68'

Sydney Olympic Park
Umpires:
James Unkles (AUS)
Gilbert Gough-Fuller (AUS)

4 July 2014
15:00

NT (Northern Territory)	2–1	(South Australia) SA
Sommerville 35'; Rintala 69'	Report	Browne 14'

Sydney Olympic Park
Umpires:
Nicholas Marshall (AUS)
Zeke Newman (AUS)

5 July 2014
09:00

NSW (New South Wales)	4–1	(Queensland) QLD
Horner 47'; Govers 50'; McEwen 52'; Elliott 66'	Report	Kruger 39'

Sydney Olympic Park
Umpires:
Jeremy Coleman (AUS)
Zeke Newman (AUS)

5 July 2014
11:00

VIC (Victoria (state))	5–4	(Australian Capital Territory) ACT
Arunasalam 3', 16'; Randhawa 17'; Gale 23'; Wookey 25'	Report	Hackett-Hansson 26'; Shepherd 43'; Day 70'; Harris 70'

Sydney Olympic Park
Umpires:
Lee Nugawela (AUS)
Nicholas Marshall (AUS)

5 July 2014
13:00

WA (Western Australia)	3–1	(Northern Territory) NT
Gibbs 23'; Gerrard 59'; Ewing 67'	Report	Rintala 6'

Sydney Olympic Park
Umpires:
Zeke Newman (AUS)
Stirling Sharpe (AUS)

5 July 2014
15:00

SA (South Australia)	3–6	(Tasmania) TAS
Pena 34'; Browne 47'; Counsell 66'	Report	Blacklow 9'; Mackey 17'; Warne 29'; Arthur 43', 54'; Beltz 59'

Sydney Olympic Park
Umpires:
Scott O'Reilly (AUS)
James Unkles (AUS)

7 July 2014
09:00

SA (South Australia)	2–7	(Western Australia) WA
Russ 44'; Counsell 49'	Report	Roberts 10'; Robertson 14', 38'; Spencer 22'; Lowes 29'; Gibbs 40'; Ewing 59'

Sydney Olympic Park
Umpires:
Gilbert Gough-Fuller (AUS)
Scott O'Reilly (AUS)

7 July 2014
11:00

NT (Northern Territory)	1–1	(Tasmania) TAS
Piggin 25'	Report	Arthur 70'

Sydney Olympic Park
Umpires:
Scott Embry (AUS)
Matthew Claxton (AUS)

7 July 2014
13:00

VIC (Victoria (state))	0–4	(New South Wales) NSW
	Report	Govers 3'; Elliott 27'; Craig 60'; Hayes 62'

Sydney Olympic Park
Umpires:
Zeke Newman (AUS)
Jeremy Coleman (AUS)

7 July 2014
15:00

QLD (Queensland)	3–1	(Australian Capital Territory) ACT
Argent 30', 35'; Rintala 41'	Report	Hopkins 60'

Sydney Olympic Park
Umpires:
James Unkles (AUS)
Nicholas Marshall (AUS)

8 July 2014
09:00

VIC (Victoria (state))	4–0	(Northern Territory) NT
Randhawa 2'; Simmonds 5'; Gilmour 41'; Wookey 66'	Report

Sydney Olympic Park
Umpires:
Nicholas Marshall (AUS)
Lee Nugawela (AUS)

8 July 2014
11:00

NSW (New South Wales)	7–4	(Tasmania) TAS
Dawson 3', 25'; Craig 11', 22', 28'; Tran 35'; Govers 52'	Report	Arthur 39', 68'; Beltz 62'; White 66'

Sydney Olympic Park
Umpires:
Jeremy Coleman (AUS)
Scott O'Reilly (AUS)

8 July 2014
13:00

QLD (Queensland)	2–1	(South Australia) SA
Douglas 12'; Boyde 69'	Report	Pena 5'

Sydney Olympic Park
Umpires:
Gilbert Gough-Fuller (AUS)
Stirling Sharpe (AUS)

8 July 2014
15:00

WA (Western Australia)	5–3	(Australian Capital Territory) ACT
Ewing 17'; Gerrard 24', 31'; Roberts 32'; Gibbs 36'	Report	Randell 63'; Stuckey 65'; Hopkins 70'

Sydney Olympic Park
Umpires:
Matthew Claxton (AUS)
James Unkles (AUS)

=== Classification matches ===
==== Fifth to eighth place classification ====
Crossover
11 July 2014
(Tasmania) TAS	4
(South Australia) SA	1
11 July 2014
(Northern Territory) NT	2
(Australian Capital Territory) ACT	5

Fifth place
12 July 2014
(Tasmania) TAS	5
(Australian Capital Territory) ACT	1
Seventh place
12 July 2014
(South Australia) SA	2
(Northern Territory) NT	6

===== Crossover matches =====
10 July 2014
09:00

TAS (Tasmania)	4–1	(South Australia) SA
Beltz 11'; Arthur 20', 50'; Blacklow 64'	Report	Hughes 35'

Sydney Olympic Park
Umpires:
Stirling Sharpe (AUS)
Nicholas Marshall (AUS)

10 July 2014
11:00

NT (Northern Territory)	2–5	(Australian Capital Territory) ACT
Hullick 25'; Lockley 54'	Report	Day 19'; Shepherd 47'; Tinter 53'; Chivers 63'; Randell 65'

Sydney Olympic Park
Umpires:
Lee Nugawela (AUS)
Scott O'Reilly (AUS)

===== Seventh and eighth place =====
11 July 2014
09:00

SA (South Australia)	2–6	(Northern Territory) NT
Casey 43'; Russ 65'	Report	MacDonald 3'; Parkin 10', 28'; Platt 13'; Lockley 17'; Latham 26'

Sydney Olympic Park
Umpires:
Zeke Newman (AUS)
Jeremy Coleman (AUS)

===== Fifth and sixth place =====
11 July 2014
11:00

TAS (Tasmania)	5–1	(Australian Capital Territory) ACT
Blacklow 3'; Arthur 28', 61', 66'; Lane 47'	Report	Laidley 50'

Sydney Olympic Park
Umpires:
Lee Nugawela (AUS)
Scott O'Reilly (AUS)

==== First to fourth place classification ====
Semi-finals
10 July 2014
(New South Wales) NSW	7
(Western Australia) WA	1
10 July 2014
(Queensland) QLD	4
(Victoria (state)) VIC	5

Gold medal match
11 July 2014
(New South Wales) NSW	7
(Victoria (state)) VIC	2
Bronze medal match
11 July 2014
(Western Australia) WA	3
(Queensland) QLD	0

===== Semi-finals =====
10 July 2014
13:00

NSW (New South Wales)	7–1	(Western Australia) WA
Govers 10', 41', 57'; Bourke 42', 45'; Dawson 50'; Hayes 64'	Report	Spencer 58'

Sydney Olympic Park
Umpires:
Jeremy Coleman (AUS)
James Unkles (AUS)

10 July 2014
15:30

QLD (Queensland)	4–5	(Victoria (state)) VIC
Mynott 29'; Kruger 44', 63'; Boyde 68'	Report	Wookey 12', 43'; Arunasalam 18'; Page 25', 66'

Sydney Olympic Park
Umpires:
Zeke Newman (AUS)
Scott Embry (AUS)

===== Third and fourth place =====
11 July 2014
13:00

WA (Western Australia)	3–0	(Queensland) QLD
Roberts 35'; Gerrard 54'; Geers 66'	Report

Sydney Olympic Park
Umpires:
Gilbert Gough-Fuller (AUS)
Stirling Sharpe (AUS)

===== Final =====
11 July 2014
16:30

NSW (New South Wales)	7–2	(Victoria (state)) VIC
Dawson 10'; Govers 17', 51', 58'; Tran 39'; Horner 41', 65'	Report	Hammond 3'; Arunasalam 46'

Sydney Olympic Park
Umpires:
Matthew Claxton (AUS)
Scott Embry (AUS)
