= 2017 Under 21 Women's Australian Hockey Championships =

2017 sporting event

2017 Under 21 Women's Australian Championships
Tournament details
- Host country: Australia
- City: Wollongong
- Teams: 8
- Venue(s): Illawarra Hockey Stadium

Final positions
- Champions: (New South Wales) NSW
- Runner-up: (Western Australia) WA
- Third place: (Queensland) QLD

Tournament statistics
- Matches played: 24
- Goals scored: 97 (4.04 per match)
- Top scorer(s): (New South Wales) Grace Stewart (7 goals)

The 2017 Women's Under 21 Australian Championships was a Field Hockey tournament held in the New South Wales city of Wollongong between 7–14 July 2017.

New South Wales won the tournament by defeating Western Australia 2–1 in the final. Queensland won the bronze medal by defeating South Australia 3–0 in the third and fourth playoff.

== Competition format ==
The tournament is divided into two pools, Pool A and Pool B, consisting of four teams in a round-robin format. Teams then progress into either Pool C, the medal round, or Pool D, the classification round. Teams carry over points from their previous match ups, and contest teams they are yet to play.

The top two teams in each of pools A and B then progress to Pool C. The top two teams in Pool C continue to contest the Final, while the bottom two teams of Pool C play in the Third and Fourth-place match.

The remaining bottom placing teams make up Pool D. The top two teams in Pool D play in the Fifth and Sixth-place match, while the bottom two teams of Pool C play in the Seventh and Eighth-place match.

== Teams ==
- Australian Capital Territory
- New South Wales
- Northern Territory
- Queensland
- South Australia
- Tasmania
- (Victoria (state)) Victoria
- Western Australia

== Results ==
=== First round ===
==== Pool A ====
Pos	Team	Pld	W	D	L	GF	GA	GD	Pts	Qualification
1	(South Australia) SA	3	2	1	0	6	3	+3	7	Advance to Medal Round
2	(Queensland) QLD	3	1	2	0	7	4	+3	5	Advance to Medal Round
3	(Victoria (state)) VIC	3	1	1	1	8	2	+6	4	Advance to 5th to 8th Classification
4	(Northern Territory) NT	3	0	0	3	0	12	−12	0	Advance to 5th to 8th Classification

Source: Hockey Australia

7 July 2017
13:00

QLD (Queensland)	3–3	(South Australia) SA
Greiner 5', 42'; Eleison 42'	Report	MacLachlan 11'; Watterson 32'; Appleyard 57'

Illawarra Hockey Stadium
Umpires:
Courtney Pearson (AUS)
Tamara Leonard (AUS)

7 July 2017
15:00

VIC (Victoria (state))	7–0	(Northern Territory) NT
Utri 7', 43', 59'; Russ 19'; Hammond 21'; Lendon 42', 51'	Report

Illawarra Hockey Stadium
Umpires:
Leonie Young (AUS)
Junko Wagatsuma (JPN)

8 July 2017
12:00

VIC (Victoria (state))	1–1	(Queensland) QLD
Christy 12'	Report	Gallagher 45'

Illawarra Hockey Stadium
Umpires:
Emma Cairnduff (AUS)
Caroline Davis (AUS)

8 July 2017
14:00

SA (South Australia)	2–0	(Northern Territory) NT
Watterson 26'; Rudd 28'	Report

Illawarra Hockey Stadium
Umpires:
Kimberleigh Todd (AUS)
Nicola Brown (AUS)

10 July 2017
16:00

QLD (Queensland)	3–0	(Northern Territory) NT
Barrett 6', 57'; Wilkinson 37'	Report

Illawarra Hockey Stadium
Umpires:
Emma Cairnduff (AUS)
Junko Wagatsuma (JPN)

10 July 2017
18:00

SA (South Australia)	1–0	(Victoria (state)) VIC
Spano 33'	Report

Illawarra Hockey Stadium
Umpires:
Deborah O'Connell (AUS)
Michelle Farnill (AUS)

==== Pool B ====
Pos	Team	Pld	W	D	L	GF	GA	GD	Pts	Qualification
1	(New South Wales) NSW	3	3	0	0	13	1	+12	9	Advance to Medal Round
2	(Western Australia) WA	3	1	1	1	6	3	+3	4	Advance to Medal Round
3	(Australian Capital Territory) ACT	3	1	1	1	6	13	−7	4	Advance to 5th to 8th Classification
4	(Tasmania) TAS	3	0	0	3	1	9	−8	0	Advance to 5th to 8th Classification

Source: Hockey Australia

7 July 2017
17:00

WA (Western Australia)	4–0	(Tasmania) TAS
Tonkin 19', 32'; Nelson 32'; Peacock 49'	Report

Illawarra Hockey Stadium
Umpires:
Emma Cairnduff (AUS)
Nicola Brown (AUS)

7 July 2017
19:00

NSW (New South Wales)	10–1	(Australian Capital Territory) ACT
Stewart 3', 36'; Spinks 13'; Wilson 21', 38', 51'; Blamey 24'; Nobbs 27'; Simpson 30'; Schonell 43'	Report	Toole 56'

Illawarra Hockey Stadium
Umpires:
Kimberleigh Todd (AUS)
Deborah O'Connell (AUS)

8 July 2017
16:00

TAS (Tasmania)	1–3	(Australian Capital Territory) ACT
Curtis 44'	Report	Wollstein 9'; Sheargold 13'; Evans 59'

Illawarra Hockey Stadium
Umpires:
Michelle Farnill (AUS)
Leonie Young (AUS)

8 July 2017
18:00

NSW (New South Wales)	1–0	(Western Australia) WA
Stewart 60'	Report

Illawarra Hockey Stadium
Umpires:
Junko Wagatsuma (JPN)
Courtney Pearson (AUS)

10 July 2017
12:00

WA (Western Australia)	2–2	(Australian Capital Territory) ACT
Archer 26'; Peacock 42'	Report	Wollstein 6'; Toole 60+'

Illawarra Hockey Stadium
Umpires:
Caroline Davis (AUS)
Tamara Leonard (AUS)

10 July 2017
14:00

TAS (Tasmania)	0–2	(New South Wales) NSW
	Report	Blamey 29'; Schonell 34'

Illawarra Hockey Stadium
Umpires:
Leonie Young (AUS)
Kimberleigh Todd (AUS)

=== Second round ===
==== Pool C (Medal Round) ====
Pos	Team	Pld	W	D	L	GF	GA	GD	Pts
1	(New South Wales) NSW	3	3	0	0	9	1	+8	9
2	(Western Australia) WA	3	1	1	1	5	3	+2	4
3	(Queensland) QLD	3	0	2	1	5	6	−1	2
4	(South Australia) SA	3	0	1	2	4	13	−9	1

Source: Hockey Australia

11 July 2017
14:00

SA (South Australia)	1–4	(Western Australia) WA
Spano 47'	Report	Peacock 8'; Williamson 22'; Gibbs 27'; Tonkin 58'

Illawarra Hockey Stadium
Umpires:
Tamara Leonard (AUS)
Junko Wagatsuma (JPN)

11 July 2017
18:00

NSW (New South Wales)	2–1	(Queensland) QLD
Schonell 26'; Wilson 32'	Report	Mathison 48'

Illawarra Hockey Stadium
Umpires:
Nicola Brown (AUS)
Courtney Pearson (AUS)

13 July 2017
14:00

SA (South Australia)	0–6	(New South Wales) NSW
	Report	Simpson 6', 9'; Stewart 19', 47'; Steel 36', 51'

Illawarra Hockey Stadium
Umpires:
Courtney Pearson (AUS)
Kimberleigh Todd (AUS)

13 July 2017
18:00

QLD (Queensland)	1–1	(Western Australia) WA
Eleison 52'	Report	Peacock 45+'

Illawarra Hockey Stadium
Umpires:
Tamara Leonard (AUS)
Nicola Brown (AUS)

==== Pool D (Classification Round) ====
Pos	Team	Pld	W	D	L	GF	GA	GD	Pts
1	(Victoria (state)) VIC	3	3	0	0	18	3	+15	9
2	(Australian Capital Territory) ACT	3	2	0	1	8	7	+1	6
3	(Northern Territory) NT	3	0	1	2	3	11	−8	1
4	(Tasmania) TAS	3	0	1	2	3	11	−8	1

Source: Hockey Australia

11 July 2017
13:00

VIC (Victoria (state))	7–1	(Tasmania) TAS
Lendon 5'; Utri 12'; Christy 18'; Hammond 38', 55'; B. Anderson 50'; M. Anderson 59'	Report	O'Conor 22'

Illawarra Hockey Stadium
Umpires:
Emma Cairnduff (AUS)
Michelle Farnill (AUS)

11 July 2017
17:00

ACT (Australian Capital Territory)	3–2	(Northern Territory) NT
Wollstein 6', 29'; Apps 42'	Report	McPhee 52'; Field 58'

Illawarra Hockey Stadium
Umpires:
Caroline Davis (AUS)
Deborah O'Connell (AUS)

13 July 2017
13:00

VIC (Victoria (state))	4–2	(Australian Capital Territory) ACT
Thompson 6'; Hammond 37'; Utri 50'; Johnson 54'	Report	Gaughan 4'; Wollstein 9'

Illawarra Hockey Stadium
Umpires:
Emma Cairnduff (AUS)
Deborah O'Connell (AUS)

13 July 2017
17:00

NT (Northern Territory)	1–1	(Tasmania) TAS
Field 13'	Report	Hinton 33'

Illawarra Hockey Stadium
Umpires:
Caroline Davis (AUS)
Leonie Young (AUS)

=== Classification matches ===
==== Seventh and eighth place ====
14 July 2017
11:15

NT (Northern Territory)	1–1	(Tasmania) TAS
Fidoe 28'	Report	Kenworthy 4'

Illawarra Hockey Stadium
Umpires:
Junko Wagatsuma (JPN)
Courtney Pearson (AUS)

==== Fifth and sixth place ====
14 July 2017
13:15

VIC (Victoria (state))	5–0	(Australian Capital Territory) ACT
Hammond 19'; Colasurdo 22'; Utri 48'; Lendon 54'; Christy 58'	Report

Illawarra Hockey Stadium
Umpires:
Deborah O'Connell (AUS)
Caroline Davis (AUS)

==== Third and fourth place ====
14 July 2017
09:00

QLD (Queensland)	3–0	(South Australia) SA
Barrett 13', 39'; Collins 51'	Report

Illawarra Hockey Stadium
Umpires:
Leonie Young (AUS)
Kimberleigh Todd (AUS)

==== Final ====
14 July 2017
13:30

NSW (New South Wales)	2–1	(Western Australia) WA
Stewart 6', 28'	Report	Peacock 18'

Illawarra Hockey Stadium
Umpires:
Nicola Brown (AUS)
Tamara Leonard (AUS)

== Statistics ==
=== Final standings ===
Pos	Team	Pld	W	D	L	GF	GA	GD	Pts	Final Result
1st place, gold medalist(s)	(New South Wales) NSW	6	6	0	0	23	3	+20	18	Gold Medal
2nd place, silver medalist(s)	(Western Australia) WA	6	2	2	2	12	7	+5	8	Silver Medal
3rd place, bronze medalist(s)	(Queensland) QLD	6	2	3	1	12	7	+5	9	Bronze Medal
4	(South Australia) SA	6	2	1	3	7	16	−9	7	Fourth Place
5	(Victoria (state)) VIC	6	4	1	1	24	5	+19	13	Fifth place
6	(Australian Capital Territory) ACT	6	2	1	3	11	24	−13	7	Sixth Place
7	(Northern Territory) NT	6	0	2	4	4	17	−13	2	Seventh Place
8	(Tasmania) TAS	6	0	2	4	4	18	−14	2	Eighth Place

Source: Hockey Australia
