= 2019 Under 21 Women's Australian Hockey Championships =

2019 Under 21 Women's Australian Championships
Tournament details
- Host country: Australia
- City: Lismore
- Teams: 8
- Venue: Lismore Hockey Centre

Final positions
- Champions: (Queensland) QLD
- Runner-up: (Victoria (state)) VIC
- Third place: (Western Australia) WA

Tournament statistics
- Matches played: 24
- Goals scored: 93 (3.88 per match)
- Top scorer: (New South Wales) Abigail Wilson (6 goals)
- Best player: (Victoria (state)) Amy Lawton

The 2019 Women's Under 21 Australian Championships is a field hockey tournament being held in the New South Wales city of Lismore from 10–17 July 2019.

== Competition format ==
The tournament is divided into two pools, Pool A and Pool B, consisting of four teams in a round-robin format. At the conclusion of the pool stage, teams progress to the quarterfinals, where the winners progress to contest the medals, while the losing teams playoff for fifth to eighth place.

== Teams ==
- (Australian Capital Territory) ACT
- (New South Wales) NSW
- (New South Wales) NSW B
- (Queensland) QLD
- (South Australia) SA
- (Tasmania) TAS
- (Victoria (state)) VIC
- (Western Australia) WA

== Results ==
=== Preliminary round ===
==== Pool A ====
Pos	Team	Pld	W	D	L	GF	GA	GD	Pts
1	(Victoria (state)) VIC	3	3	0	0	13	4	+9	9
2	(New South Wales) NSW	3	2	0	1	9	4	+5	6
3	(Tasmania) TAS	3	1	0	2	3	7	−4	3
4	(Australian Capital Territory) ACT	3	0	0	3	3	13	−10	0

Updated to match(es) played on 10 July 2019. Source: Hockey Australia

10 July 2018
10:00

NSW (New South Wales)	5–0	(Australian Capital Territory) ACT
Wilson 7', 42'; Bradley 34'; Tobbe 48', 54'	Report

Umpires:
Lauren Berndt (AUS)
Cassidy Gallagher (AUS)

10 July 2018
12:00

VIC (Victoria (state))	3–1	(Tasmania) TAS
James 2'; Downes 42', 54'	Report	Haas 49'

Umpires:
Deborah O'Connell (AUS)
Emily Ogden (AUS)

11 July 2018
11:00

VIC (Victoria (state))	4–1	(New South Wales) NSW
Lewis 17'; Hamilton-Smith 27'; Lawton 39'; Colasurdo 42'	Report	Schonell 59'

Umpires:
Kimberleigh Todd (AUS)
Alissia Pearson (AUS)

11 July 2018
13:00

ACT (Australian Capital Territory)	1–2	(Tasmania) TAS
Dooley 35'	Report	Gunn 48'; Bridley 57'

Umpires:
Michelle Farnill (AUS)
Cassidy Gallagher (AUS)

13 July 2018
12:30

ACT (Australian Capital Territory)	2–6	(Victoria (state)) VIC
Albuquerque 37'; Suleski 47'	Report	Hamilton-Smith 10', 57'; Elston 26'; James 33'; Scott 46'; Lewis 58'

Umpires:
Cassidy Gallagher (AUS)
Kimberleigh Todd (AUS)

13 July 2018
14:30

NSW (New South Wales)	3–0	(Tasmania) TAS
Wilson 13'; Bradley 21'; Schonell 44'	Report

Umpires:
Lauren Berndt (AUS)
Tamara Leonard (AUS)

==== Pool B ====
Pos	Team	Pld	W	D	L	GF	GA	GD	Pts
1	(Queensland) QLD	3	3	0	0	11	4	+7	9
2	(Western Australia) WA	3	2	0	1	6	4	+2	6
3	(South Australia) SA	3	0	1	2	2	4	−2	1
4	(New South Wales) NSW B	3	0	1	2	5	12	−7	1

Updated to match(es) played on 10 July 2019. Source: Hockey Australia

10 July 2018
14:00

QLD (Queensland)	8–3	(New South Wales) NSW B
Mathison 3'; Malone 4'; Dolkens 7', 22', 33'; Johnson 48', 53'; Harris 53'	Report	Draper 10', 43'; Janes 45'

Umpires:
Kimberleigh Todd (AUS)
Michelle Farnill (AUS)

10 July 2018
16:00

SA (South Australia)	1–2	(Western Australia) WA
Collings 23'	Report	Rockliff 28'; Somerville 48'

Umpires:
Alissia Pearson (AUS)
Cassidy Gallagher (AUS)

11 July 2018
15:00

NSW B (New South Wales)	1–3	(Western Australia) WA
O'Brien 2'	Report	Rockliff 32'; Van der Zwan 33'; Sertorio 59'

Umpires:
Lauren Berndt (AUS)
Deborah O'Connell (AUS)

11 July 2018
17:00

SA (South Australia)	0–1	(Queensland) QLD
	Report	Malone 28'

Umpires:
Kimberleigh Todd (AUS)
Emily Ogden (AUS)

13 July 2018
08:30

QLD (Queensland)	2–1	(Western Australia) WA
Malone 31'; Greiner 60'	Report	Somerville 33'

Umpires:
Tamara Leonard (AUS)
Michelle Farnill (AUS)

13 July 2018
10:30

NSW B (New South Wales)	1–1	(South Australia) SA
Waddell 35'	Report	Shand 49'

Umpires:
Alissia Pearson (AUS)
Emily Ogden (AUS)

=== Classification round ===
Quarter-finals
14 July 2019
(Victoria (state)) VIC	4
(New South Wales) NSW B	0
14 July 2019
(Western Australia) WA	4
(Tasmania) TAS	0
14 July 2019
(New South Wales) NSW	1 (3)
(South Australia) SA (p.s.o)	1 (4)
14 July 2019
(Queensland) QLD	4
(Australian Capital Territory) ACT	0

Semi-finals
16 July 2019
(Victoria (state)) VIC	2
(Western Australia) WA	1
16 July 2019
(South Australia) SA	0
(Queensland) QLD	2

Final
17 July 2019
(Victoria (state)) VIC	1
(Queensland) QLD	2
Third-place match
17 July 2019
(Western Australia) WA	1
(South Australia) SA	0

==== Quarter-finals ====
14 July 2018
10:30

VIC (Victoria (state))	4–0	(New South Wales) NSW B
James 28'; Hamilton-Smith 35'; Lawton 37'; Lendon 54'	Report

Umpires:
Alissia Pearson (AUS)
Lauren Berndt (AUS)

14 July 2018
12:30

NSW (New South Wales)	1–1	(South Australia) SA
Schonell 49'	Report	Brown 29'
Penalties
Wilson (penalty shoot-out scored); Arnott (penalty shoot-out missed); Callander (penalty shoot-out missed); Blamey (penalty shoot-out scored); Schonell (penalty shoot-out scored) —— Wilson (penalty shoot-out missed)	3–4	(penalty shoot-out scored) De Broughe; (penalty shoot-out scored) Shand; (penalty shoot-out missed) Appleyard; (penalty shoot-out scored) Brown; (penalty shoot-out missed) Hoffman —— (penalty shoot-out scored) De Broughe

Umpires:
Emily Ogden (AUS)
Michelle Farnill (AUS)

14 July 2018
14:30

WA (Western Australia)	4–0	(Tasmania) TAS
Faichney 9'; Archer 19', 42'; DeSilva 23'	Report

Umpires:
Deborah O'Connell (AUS)
Kimberleigh Todd (AUS)

14 July 2018
16:30

QLD (Queensland)	4–0	(Australian Capital Territory) ACT
Harris 16', 41', 60'; Johnson 44'	Report

Umpires:
Cassidy Gallagher (AUS)
Tamara Leonard (AUS)

==== Fifth to eighth place classification ====
Crossover
16 July 2019
(New South Wales) NSW B	1
(Tasmania) TAS	2
16 July 2019
(New South Wales) NSW	3
(Australian Capital Territory) ACT	0

Fifth-place match
17 July 2019
(Tasmania) TAS	0
(New South Wales) NSW	6
Seventh-place match
17 July 2019
(New South Wales) NSW B	4
(Australian Capital Territory) ACT	2

===== Crossover =====
16 July 2018
13:30

NSW B (New South Wales)	1–2	(Tasmania) TAS
O'Brien 3'	Report	Haas 10'; Williams 21'

Umpires:
Cassidy Gallagher (AUS)
Lauren Berndt (AUS)

16 July 2018
15:30

NSW (New South Wales)	3–0	(Australian Capital Territory) ACT
Tobbe 10'; Blamey 45', 49'	Report

Umpires:
Alissia Pearson (AUS)
Tamara Leonard (AUS)

===== Seventh and eighth place =====
17 July 2018
11:00

NSW B (New South Wales)	4–2	(Australian Capital Territory) ACT
Draper 11'; O'Brien 20'; Pickering 43'; Duncan 58'	Report	Ochsenbein 9'; Thomson 41'

Umpires:
Lauren Berndt (AUS)
Alissia Pearson (AUS)

===== Fifth and sixth place =====
17 July 2018
15:20

TAS (Tasmania)	0–6	(New South Wales) NSW
	Report	Arnott 6'; Wilson 13', 27', 45'; Blamey 15'; Tobbe 52'

Umpires:
Emily Ogden (AUS)
Cassidy Gallagher (AUS)

==== First to fourth place classification ====
===== Semi-finals =====
16 July 2018
09:00

VIC (Victoria (state))	2–1	(Western Australia) WA
Hamilton-Smith 47'; Lawton 56'	Report	Rogers-Uff 44'

Umpires:
Deborah O'Connell (AUS)
Emily Ogden (AUS)

16 July 2018
11:00

SA (South Australia)	0–2	(Queensland) QLD
	Report	Harris 28'; Dolkens 44'

Umpires:
Kimberleigh Todd (AUS)
Michelle Farnill (AUS)

===== Third and fourth place =====
17 July 2018
09:00

WA (Western Australia)	1–0	(South Australia) SA
Faichney 26'	Report

Umpires:
Tamara Leonard (AUS)
Deborah O'Connell (AUS)

===== Final =====
17 July 2018
13:20

VIC (Victoria (state))	1–2	(Queensland) QLD
Scott 51'	Report	Smith 27'; Mathison 29'

Umpires:
Michelle Farnill (AUS)
Kimberleigh Todd (AUS)

== Statistics ==
=== Final standings ===
Pos	Grp	Team	Pld	W	D	L	GF	GA	GD	Pts	Final Result
1st place, gold medalist(s)	B	(Queensland) QLD	6	6	0	0	19	5	+14	18	Gold Medal
2nd place, silver medalist(s)	A	(Victoria (state)) VIC	6	5	0	1	20	7	+13	15	Silver Medal
3rd place, bronze medalist(s)	B	(Western Australia) WA	6	4	0	2	12	6	+6	12	Bronze Medal
4	B	(South Australia) SA	6	0	2	4	3	8	−5	2	Fourth Place
5	A	(New South Wales) NSW	6	4	1	1	19	5	+14	13	Fifth place
6	A	(Tasmania) TAS	6	2	0	4	5	18	−13	6	Sixth Place
7	B	(New South Wales) NSW B	6	1	1	4	10	20	−10	4	Seventh Place
8	A	(Australian Capital Territory) ACT	6	0	0	6	5	24	−19	0	Eighth Place

Source: Hockey Australia

=== Goalscorers ===
There were 93 goals scored in 24 matches, for an average of 3.88 goals per match.

6 goals

- (New South Wales) Abigail Wilson

5 goals

- (Queensland) Ruby Harris
- (Victoria (state)) Emily Hamilton-Smith

4 goals

- (New South Wales) Helena Tobbe
- (Queensland) Dayle Dolkens

3 goals

- (New South Wales) Morgan Blamey
- (New South Wales) India Draper
- (New South Wales) Emma O'Brien
- (New South Wales) Courtney Schonell
- (Queensland) Annabelle Johnson
- (Queensland) Ambrosia Malone
- (Victoria (state)) Carly James
- (Victoria (state)) Amy Lawton

2 goals

- (New South Wales) Julia Bradley
- (Queensland) Morgan Mathison
- (Tasmania) Molly Haas
- (Victoria (state)) Olivia Downes
- (Victoria (state)) Kelsey Lewis
- (Western Australia) Sienna Archer
- (Western Australia) Ciara Faichney
- (Western Australia) Renee Rockliff
- (Western Australia) Karri Somerville

1 goal

- (Australian Capital Territory) Shimona Albuquerque
- (Australian Capital Territory) Madeline Dooley
- (Australian Capital Territory) Harriet Ochsenbein
- (Australian Capital Territory) Isabella Suleski
- (Australian Capital Territory) Taylor Thomson
- (New South Wales) Alice Arnott
- (New South Wales) Naomi Duncan
- (New South Wales) Rebecca Janes
- (New South Wales) Lexie Pickering
- (New South Wales) Emily Waddell
- (Queensland) Rebecca Greiner
- (Queensland) Jade Smith
- (South Australia) Rhyleigh Brown
- (South Australia) Sophie Collings
- (South Australia) Hattie Shand
- (Tasmania) Phillida Bridley
- (Tasmania) Julia Gunn
- (Tasmania) Georgia Williams
- (Victoria (state)) Isabella Colasurdo
- (Victoria (state)) Georgia Elston
- (Victoria (state)) Meagan Lendon
- (Victoria (state)) Madison Scott
- (Western Australia) Britney DeSilva
- (Western Australia) Sage Rogers-Uff
- (Western Australia) Jolie Sertorio
- (Western Australia) Jade Vanderzwan

Source: Hockey Australia
