= 2015 Under 21 Men's Australian Hockey Championships =

2015 Men's Under 21 Australian Hockey Championships
Tournament details
- Host country: Australia
- City: Canberra
- Teams: 8
- Venue(s): National Hockey Centre

Final positions
- Champions: (Victoria (state)) Victoria
- Runner-up: Western Australia
- Third place: New South Wales

Tournament statistics
- Matches played: 24
- Goals scored: 159 (6.63 per match)
- Top scorer(s): (New South Wales) Jack Elliott (10 goals)

The 2015 Men's Under 21 Australian Hockey Championships was a men's Field Hockey tournament held in the Australian Capital Territory city of Canberra.

Victoria won the gold medal after defeating Western Australia 2–1 in the final. New South Wales won the bronze medal by defeating Queensland 6–3 in the third and fourth playoff.

== Competition format ==
The tournament is divided into two pools, Pool A and Pool B, consisting of four teams in a round robin format. Teams then progress into either Pool C, the medal round, or Pool D, the classification round. Teams carry over points from their previous match ups, and contest teams they are yet to play.

The top two teams in each of pools A and B then progress to Pool C. The top two teams in Pool C continue to contest the Final, while the bottom two teams of Pool C play in the Third and Fourth place match.

The remaining bottom placing teams make up Pool D. The top two teams in Pool D play in the Fifth and Sixth place match, while the bottom two teams of Pool C play in the Seventh and Eighth place match.

== Teams ==
- Australian Capital Territory
- New South Wales
- Northern Territory
- Queensland
- South Australia
- Tasmania
- (Victoria (state)) Victoria
- Western Australia

== Results ==
=== First round ===
==== Pool A ====
Pos	Team	Pld	W	D	L	GF	GA	GD	Pts	Qualification
1	(Western Australia) WA	3	3	0	0	11	4	+7	9	Medal round
2	(New South Wales) NSW	3	2	0	1	20	4	+16	6	Medal round
3	(South Australia) SA	3	1	0	2	5	13	−8	3	5th–8th classification
4	(Australian Capital Territory) ACT	3	0	0	3	5	20	−15	0	5th–8th classification

12 July 2015
11:30

NSW (New South Wales)	10–2	(South Australia) SA
Elliott 13', 35', 44'; Brand 15', 46'; Horner 19', 46'; Scotcher 21'; Sharp 57'; Stewart 59'	Report	Gleeson 11'; Morton 42'

National Hockey Centre
Umpires:
James Unkles (AUS)
Ben Hocking (AUS)

12 July 2015
15:30

WA (Western Australia)	8–3	(Australian Capital Territory) ACT
Gerrard 4'; Barton 16'; Roberts 24'; Spencer 28', 49' de Bes 37'; Benetti 51'; Hall 56'	Report	Hopkins 28'; Shepherd 44'; McLennan 46'

National Hockey Centre
Umpires:
Adrian Cross (AUS)
Andrew Brown (AUS)

13 July 2015
11:30

ACT (Australian Capital Territory)	0–9	(New South Wales) NSW
	Report	Elliott 8'; Horner 14', 16', 45', 53'; Sharp 15'; Brand 21'; Liles 44'; Dawson 47'

National Hockey Centre
Umpires:
Matthew Claxton (AUS)
Ben Hocking (AUS)

13 July 2015
13:30

WA (Western Australia)	1–0	(South Australia) SA
Lowes 39'	Report

National Hockey Centre
Umpires:
Adrian Cross (AUS)
Gilbert Gough-Fuller (AUS)

15 July 2015
09:30

NSW (New South Wales)	1–2	(Western Australia) WA
Elliott 31'	Report	Gibbs 24'; Hall 42'

National Hockey Centre
Umpires:
James Unkles (AUS)
Matthew Claxton (AUS)

15 July 2015
13:30

SA (South Australia)	3–2	(Australian Capital Territory) ACT
Gleeson 24'; Keeves 29'; Morton 46'	Report	Day 4', 60'

National Hockey Centre
Umpires:
Ben Hocking (AUS)
Aaron Gotting (AUS)

==== Pool B ====
Pos	Team	Pld	W	D	L	GF	GA	GD	Pts	Qualification
1	(Victoria (state)) VIC	3	3	0	0	20	2	+18	9	Medal round
2	(Queensland) QLD	3	2	0	1	12	11	+1	6	Medal round
3	(Tasmania) TAS	3	0	1	2	8	14	−6	1	5th–8th classification
4	(Northern Territory) NT	3	0	1	2	4	17	−13	1	5th–8th classification

12 July 2015
09:30

VIC (Victoria (state))	6–1	(Tasmania) TAS
Knee 13'; Arunasalam 28'; Allan 36'; Bretherton 37'; Page 39', 47'	Report	Grice 57'

National Hockey Centre
Umpires:
Matthew Claxton (AUS)
Stirling Sharpe (AUS)

12 July 2015
13:30

QLD (Queensland)	6–1	(Northern Territory) NT
Kruger 30'; Boyde 34'; Taylor 43'; Warne 49'; Crane 50'; Argent 55'	Report	Parkin 52'

National Hockey Centre
Umpires:
Gilbert Gough-Fuller (AUS)
Carl Mueller (AUS)

13 July 2015
09:30

TAS (Tasmania)	4–5	(Queensland) QLD
Austin 9'; Walker-Kidd 19', 45'; Dart 34'	Report	Argent 3'; Howard 9'; Christensen 12'; Rintala 44'; Boyde 47'

National Hockey Centre
Umpires:
James Unkles (AUS)
Stirling Sharpe (AUS)

13 July 2015
15:30

VIC (Victoria (state))	8–0	(Northern Territory) NT
Arunasalam 1'; Hendry 15'; Scanlon 21', 34'; Allan 33', 39'; Howell 37'; Page 38'	Report

National Hockey Centre
Umpires:
Jordan Glover (AUS)
Aaron Gotting (AUS)

15 July 2015
11:30

NT (Northern Territory)	3–3	(Tasmania) TAS
Butterick 1'; Anderson 26'; Kilburn 41'	Report	Beltz 3', 20'; White 33'

National Hockey Centre
Umpires:
Jordan Glover (AUS)
Andrew Brown (AUS)

15 July 2015
15:30

QLD (Queensland)	1–6	(Victoria (state)) VIC
Kruger 25'	Report	Arunasalam 3'; Scanlon 5', 39'; Hendry 32'; Allan 50'; Howell 59'

National Hockey Centre
Umpires:
Stirling Sharpe (AUS)
Carl Mueller (AUS)

=== Second round ===
==== Pool C (medal round) ====
Pos	Team	Pld	W	D	L	GF	GA	GD	Pts
1	(Victoria (state)) VIC	3	2	1	0	9	3	+6	7
2	(Western Australia) WA	3	1	1	1	2	5	−3	4
3	(New South Wales) NSW	3	1	0	2	10	6	+4	3
4	(Queensland) QLD	3	1	0	2	6	13	−7	3

16 July 2015
13:30

NSW (New South Wales)	7–1	(Queensland) QLD
Dawson 8', 25'; Sharp 22'; Elliott 23', 31', 58'; Horner 60'	Report	Kruger 22'

National Hockey Centre
Umpires:
Ben Hocking (AUS)
Carl Mueller (AUS)

16 July 2015
15:30

WA (Western Australia)	0–0	(Victoria (state)) VIC
	Report

National Hockey Centre
Umpires:
Matthew Claxton (AUS)
Gilbert Gough-Fuller (AUS)

18 July 2015
13:30

VIC (Victoria (state))	3–2	(New South Wales) NSW
Dolenc 9'; Bretheron 34'; Arunasalam 57'	Report	Liles 4'; Elliott 33'

National Hockey Centre
Umpires:
Stirling Sharpe (AUS)
Carl Mueller (AUS)

18 July 2015
15:30

WA (Western Australia)	0–4	(Queensland) QLD
	Report	Warne 14', 36'; Kruger 38'; Howard 39'

National Hockey Centre
Umpires:
James Unkles (AUS)
Gilbert Gough-Fuller (AUS)

==== Pool D (classification round) ====
Pos	Team	Pld	W	D	L	GF	GA	GD	Pts
1	(South Australia) SA	3	2	0	1	12	8	+4	6
2	(Tasmania) TAS	3	1	2	0	11	10	+1	5
3	(Australian Capital Territory) ACT	3	0	2	1	9	10	−1	2
4	(Northern Territory) NT	3	0	2	1	8	12	−4	2

16 July 2015
09:30

ACT (Australian Capital Territory)	3–3	(Northern Territory) NT
McLennan 23', 60'; Day 27'	Report	Hullick 12'; Horton 35'; Carseldine 57'

National Hockey Centre
Umpires:
Jordan Glover (AUS)
Andrew Brown (AUS)

16 July 2015
11:30

SA (South Australia)	3–4	(Tasmania) TAS
Keeves 2'; Morton 24'; Casey 45'	Report	Walker-Kidd 17', 32'; Brophy 32'; Dart 41'

National Hockey Centre
Umpires:
Adrian Cross (AUS)
Aaron Gotting (AUS)

18 July 2015
09:30

TAS (Tasmania)	4–4	(Australian Capital Territory) ACT
Walker-Kidd 7', 51'; Austin 23', 39'	Report	Day 22', 37', 57'; Chivers 42'

National Hockey Centre
Umpires:
Adrian Cross (AUS)
Jordan Glover (AUS)

18 July 2015
11:30

SA (South Australia)	6–2	(Northern Territory) NT
Morton 23', 32'; Burgess 35', 36'; Gleeson 43'; Larwood 60'	Report	Anderson 10'; Butterick 52'

National Hockey Centre
Umpires:
Andrew Brown (AUS)
Aaron Gotting (AUS)

=== Classification matches ===
==== Seventh and eighth place ====
19 July 2015
09:30

ACT (Australian Capital Territory)	7–4	(Northern Territory) NT
McLennan 2', 2'; Day 18'; Randell 38'; Shepherd 40', 55'; Baker 50'	Report	Carseldine 4', 14', 40', 49'

National Hockey Centre
Umpires:
Ben Hocking (AUS)
Andrew Brown (AUS)

==== Fifth and sixth place ====
19 July 2015
11:30

SA (South Australia)	2–3	(Tasmania) TAS
Keeves 29'; Mitton 48'	Report	White 9'; Welch 37'; Beckett 44'

National Hockey Centre
Umpires:
Gilbert Gough-Fuller (AUS)
Aaron Gotting (AUS)

==== Third and fourth place ====
19 July 2015
13:30

NSW (New South Wales)	6–3	(Queensland) QLD
Horner 8', 42'; Brand 23'; Smith 30'; Hill 39'; Elliott 46'	Report	Taylor 10'; Argent 15', 34'

National Hockey Centre
Umpires:
James Unkles (AUS)
Carl Mueller (AUS)

==== Final ====
19 July 2015
16:00

VIC (Victoria (state))	2–1	(Western Australia) WA
Scanlon 33', 49'	Report	Gerrard 45'

National Hockey Centre
Umpires:
Matthew Claxton (AUS)
Stirling Sharpe (AUS)

== Statistics ==
=== Final standings ===
Pos	Team	Pld	W	D	L	GF	GA	GD	Pts	Final result
1st place, gold medalist(s)	(Victoria (state)) Victoria	6	5	1	0	25	5	+20	16	Gold medal
2nd place, silver medalist(s)	Western Australia	6	3	1	2	12	10	+2	10	Silver medal
3rd place, bronze medalist(s)	New South Wales	6	4	0	2	35	11	+24	12	Bronze medal
4	Queensland	6	3	0	3	20	24	−4	9	Fourth place
5	Tasmania	6	2	2	2	19	23	−4	8	Fifth place
6	South Australia	6	2	0	4	16	22	−6	6	Sixth place
7	Australian Capital Territory	6	1	2	3	19	31	−12	5	Seventh place
8	Northern Territory	6	0	2	4	13	33	−20	2	Eighth place
