= 2012 Under 21 Women's Australian Hockey Championships =

2012 Women's Under 21 Australian Championships
Tournament details
- Host country: Australia
- City: Adelaide
- Teams: 8
- Venue(s): State Hockey Centre

Final positions
- Champions: (New South Wales) NSW
- Runner-up: (South Australia) SA
- Third place: (Queensland) QLD

Tournament statistics
- Matches played: 36
- Goals scored: 130 (3.61 per match)
- Top scorer(s): (Victoria (state)) Tegan Purser (8 goals)

The 2012 Under 21 Women's Australian Championships was a women's field hockey tournament held in the South Australian city of Adelaide, from 10 to 21 July.

NSW won the gold medal after defeating SA 3–1 in the final. QLD won the bronze medal by defeating the ACT 3–1 in the third place match.

== Teams ==
- (Australian Capital Territory) ACT
- (New South Wales) NSW
- (Northern Territory) NT
- (Queensland) QLD
- (South Australia) SA
- (Tasmania) TAS
- (Victoria (state)) VIC
- (Western Australia) WA

== Results ==
=== Preliminary round ===
Pos	Team	Pld	W	D	L	GF	GA	GD	Pts	Qualification
1	(New South Wales) NSW	7	6	0	1	21	3	+18	18	Advance to Semi-finals
2	(Queensland) QLD	7	5	1	1	13	3	+10	16	Advance to Semi-finals
3	(South Australia) SA	7	4	2	1	10	5	+5	14	Advance to Semi-finals
4	(Australian Capital Territory) ACT	7	3	2	2	15	13	+2	11	Advance to Semi-finals
5	(Western Australia) WA	7	3	0	4	13	11	+2	9	
6	(Victoria (state)) VIC	7	1	1	5	17	15	+2	4	
7	(Northern Territory) NT	7	1	1	5	7	22	−15	4	
8	(Tasmania) TAS	7	1	1	5	5	29	−24	4	

Source: Hockey Australia
Rules for classification: 1) points; 2) matches won; 3) goal difference; 4) goals for; 5) head-to-head result; 6) field goals scored.

==== Fixtures ====
10 July 2012
09:00

WA (Western Australia)	0–2	(New South Wales) NSW
	Report	Williams 61'; M. Rosser 70'

Stadium:
State Hockey Centre

10 July 2012
11:00

QLD (Queensland)	4–1	(Victoria (state)) VIC
Kershaw 37'; Fey 49', 53'; Pavish 69'	Report	Purser 44'

Stadium:
State Hockey Centre

10 July 2012
13:00

ACT (Australian Capital Territory)	3–3	(Tasmania) TAS
Gilmore 4'; Evans 44'; Kindon 65'	Report	Britton 9'; Patten 13'; Westland 45'

Stadium:
State Hockey Centre

10 July 2012
15:00

SA (South Australia)	3–1	(Northern Territory) NT
Nance 19', 42'; Appleyard 34'	Report	Osborne 51'

Stadium:
State Hockey Centre

11 July 2012
09:00

QLD (Queensland)	4–1	(Western Australia) WA
Fitzpatrick 12'; Brittain 30'; Fey 59'; Hillas 64'	Report	Flynn 50'

Stadium:
State Hockey Centre

11 July 2012
11:00

TAS (Tasmania)	1–2	(Northern Territory) NT
Griffiths 70'	Report	Peris 57', 68'

Stadium:
State Hockey Centre

11 July 2012
13:00

ACT (Australian Capital Territory)	1–1	(South Australia) SA
Lee 34'	Report	Sobels 41'

Stadium:
State Hockey Centre

11 July 2012
15:00

NSW (New South Wales)	1–0	(Victoria (state)) VIC
Pearce 2'	Report

Stadium:
State Hockey Centre

13 July 2012
09:00

VIC (Victoria (state))	2–3	(Western Australia) WA
Peskett 44'; Padget 68'	Report	Flynn 20'; Slattery 27'; Mazzini 58'

Stadium:
State Hockey Centre

13 July 2012
11:00

NT (Northern Territory)	2–4	(Australian Capital Territory) ACT
Evans 32'; Orrock 43'	Report	Gilmore 3', 27', 40'; Cartwright 35'

Stadium:
State Hockey Centre

13 July 2012
13:00

SA (South Australia)	3–0	(Tasmania) TAS
Welstead 29'; Gordon 39', 64'	Report

Stadium:
State Hockey Centre

13 July 2012
15:00

NSW (New South Wales)	0–1	(Queensland) QLD
	Report	Pavish 12'

Stadium:
State Hockey Centre

14 July 2012
09:00

SA (South Australia)	0–0	(Queensland) QLD
	Report

Stadium:
State Hockey Centre

14 July 2012
11:00

WA (Western Australia)	0–2	(Australian Capital Territory) ACT
	Report	Kindon 11'; Bailey-Price 31'

Stadium:
State Hockey Centre

14 July 2012
13:00

NT (Northern Territory)	1–1	(Victoria (state)) VIC
Thompson 56'	Report	Purser 67'

Stadium:
State Hockey Centre

14 July 2012
15:00

TAS (Tasmania)	0–6	(New South Wales) NSW
	Report	Morgan 27'; Williams 38'; Pearce 42', 70'; Khoury 45'; Simpson 59'

Stadium:
State Hockey Centre

16 July 2012
09:00

QLD (Queensland)	2–0	(Northern Territory) NT
Brittain 8'; Hillas 58'	Report

Stadium:
State Hockey Centre

16 July 2012
11:00

WA (Western Australia)	6–0	(Tasmania) TAS
Slattery 6', 39', 41', 43', 56'; Symons 49'	Report

Stadium:
State Hockey Centre

16 July 2012
13:00

ACT (Australian Capital Territory)	1–2	(New South Wales) NSW
Gilmore 24'	Report	Williams 28'; Clifton 42'

Stadium:
State Hockey Centre

16 July 2012
15:00

VIC (Victoria (state))	1–2	(South Australia) SA
Boucher 67'	Report	Sobels 20'; Gordon 52'

Stadium:
State Hockey Centre

17 July 2012
09:00

VIC (Victoria (state))	9–0	(Tasmania) TAS
Purser 1', 16', 34', 41', 66'; Hogan 23', 53'; Breen 30'; Boucher 34'	Report

Stadium:
State Hockey Centre

17 July 2012
11:00

NSW (New South Wales)	8–1	(Northern Territory) NT
Pearce 7', 48', 58'; M. Rosser 8', 27', 35'; Khoury 12'; Williams 14'	Report	Porter 46'

Stadium:
State Hockey Centre

17 July 2012
13:00

SA (South Australia)	1–0	(Western Australia) WA
Gordon 31'	Report

Stadium:
State Hockey Centre

17 July 2012
15:00

QLD (Queensland)	2–0	(Australian Capital Territory) ACT
Day 5'; Fey 7'	Report

Stadium:
State Hockey Centre

18 July 2012
09:00

NT (Northern Territory)	0–3	(Western Australia) WA
	Report	Symons 14', 45'; Denning 70'

Stadium:
State Hockey Centre

18 July 2012
11:00

NSW (New South Wales)	2–0	(South Australia) SA
Hotham 47'; Pearce 70'	Report

Stadium:
State Hockey Centre

18 July 2012
13:00

ACT (Australian Capital Territory)	4–3	(Victoria (state)) VIC
Evans 12'; Cartwright 14'; Kindon 64'; Gilmore 50'	Report	Boucher 27'; Purser 38'; Moore 64'

Stadium:
State Hockey Centre

18 July 2012
15:00

TAS (Tasmania)	1–0	(Queensland) QLD
Griffiths 7'	Report

Stadium:
State Hockey Centre

=== Classification round ===
==== Fifth to eighth place classification ====
Crossover
20 July 2012
(Western Australia) WA	3
(Tasmania) TAS	0
20 July 2012
(Victoria (state)) VIC	2
(Northern Territory) NT	1

Fifth Place
21 July 2012
(Western Australia) WA	2
(Victoria (state)) VIC	1
Seventh Place
21 July 2012
(Tasmania) TAS	2
(Northern Territory) NT	3

===== Crossover =====
20 July 2012
11:30

WA (Western Australia)	3–0	(Tasmania) TAS
Mazzini 7'; Symons 59', 64'	Report

Stadium:
State Hockey Centre

20 July 2012
14:00

VIC (Victoria (state))	2–1	(Northern Territory) NT
Boucher 43'; Bates 62'	Report	Goode 14'

Stadium:
State Hockey Centre

===== Seventh and eighth place =====
21 July 2012
09:00

TAS (Tasmania)	2–3	(Northern Territory) NT
Commerford 9'; Britton 44'	Report	Thompson 28'; Parker 57'; Peris 68'

Stadium:
State Hockey Centre

===== Fifth and sixth place =====
21 July 2012
11:30

WA (Western Australia)	2–1	(Victoria (state)) VIC
Slattery 22'; Squibb 59'	Report	Snow 35'

Stadium:
State Hockey Centre

==== First to fourth place classification ====
Semi-Finals
20 July 2012
(New South Wales) NSW	4
(Australian Capital Territory) ACT	1
20 July 2012
(Queensland) QLD	1 (0)
(South Australia) SA (pen.)	1 (2)

Final
21 July 2012
(New South Wales) NSW	3
(South Australia) SA	1
Third Place
21 July 2012
(Australian Capital Territory) ACT	1
(Queensland) QLD	3

===== Semi-finals =====
20 July 2012
09:00

QLD (Queensland)	1–1	(South Australia) SA
Fey 56'	Report	Sobels 31'
Penalties
	0–2

Stadium:
State Hockey Centre

20 July 2012
16:30

NSW (New South Wales)	4–1	(Australian Capital Territory) ACT
Khoury 9', 46'; Williams 35'; Simpson 43'	Report	Kindon 9'

Stadium:
State Hockey Centre

===== Third and fourth place =====
21 July 2012
14:00

ACT (Australian Capital Territory)	1–3	(Queensland) QLD
Gilmore 41'	Report	Allendorf 5'; Kershaw 15'; Brittain 31'

Stadium:
State Hockey Centre

===== Final =====
21 July 2012
16:30

NSW (New South Wales)	3–1	(South Australia) SA
Khoury 3', 23', 70'	Report	McMahon 43'

Stadium:
State Hockey Centre

== Statistics ==
=== Final standings ===
As per statistical convention in field hockey, matches decided in extra time are counted as wins and losses, while matches decided by penalty shoot-outs are counted as draws.

Pos	Team	Pld	W	D	L	GF	GA	GD	Pts	Final Standings
1st place, gold medalist(s)	(New South Wales) NSW	9	8	0	1	28	5	+23	24	Gold Medal
2nd place, silver medalist(s)	(South Australia) SA	9	4	3	2	12	9	+3	15	Silver Medal
3rd place, bronze medalist(s)	(Queensland) QLD	9	6	2	1	17	5	+12	20	Bronze Medal
4	(Australian Capital Territory) ACT	9	3	2	4	17	20	−3	11	
5	(Western Australia) WA	9	5	0	4	18	12	+6	15	
6	(Victoria (state)) VIC	9	2	1	6	20	18	+2	7	
7	(Northern Territory) NT	9	2	1	6	11	26	−15	7	
8	(Tasmania) TAS	9	1	1	7	7	35	−28	4	

Source: Hockey Australia

=== Goalscorers ===
There were 130 goals scored in 36 matches, for an average of 3.61 goals per match.

8 goals

- (Victoria (state)) Tegan Purser

7 goals

- (Australian Capital Territory) Kate Gilmore
- (New South Wales) Nina Khoury
- (New South Wales) Kirsten Pearce
- (Western Australia) Kathryn Slattery

5 goals

- (New South Wales) Mariah Williams
- (Queensland) Ashlea Fey
- (Western Australia) Katy Symons

4 goals

- (Australian Capital Territory) Stephanie Kindon
- (New South Wales) Maddison Rosser
- (South Australia) Tiarna Gordon
- (Victoria (state)) Tegan Boucher

3 goals

- (Northern Territory) Brooke Peris
- (Queensland) Cassandra Brittain
- (South Australia) Eloise Sobels

2 goals

- (Australian Capital Territory) Jenna Cartwright
- (Australian Capital Territory) Naomi Evans
- (New South Wales) Cara Simpson
- (Northern Territory) Aleesha Thompson
- (Queensland) Georgia Hillas
- (Queensland) Stephanie Kershaw
- (Queensland) Samantha Pavish
- (South Australia) Gabrielle Nance
- (Tasmania) Tayla Britton
- (Tasmania) Lauren Griffiths
- (Victoria (state)) Nicola Hogan
- (Western Australia) Kyra Flynn
- (Western Australia) Danica Mazzini

1 goal

- (Australian Capital Territory) Catriona Bailey-Price
- (Australian Capital Territory) Rebecca Lee
- (New South Wales) Emma Clifton
- (New South Wales) Esther Hotham
- (New South Wales) Georgina Morgan
- (Northern Territory) Tayler Evans
- (Northern Territory) Sarah Goode
- (Northern Territory) Kayla Orrock
- (Northern Territory) Yasmin Osborne
- (Northern Territory) Gabriella Parker
- (Northern Territory) Caitlin Porter
- (Queensland) Murphy Allendorf
- (Queensland) Jacqui Day
- (Queensland) Savannah Fitzpatrick
- (South Australia) Brooke Appleyard
- (South Australia) Karri McMahon
- (South Australia) Leah Welstead
- (Tasmania) Kalindi Commerford
- (Tasmania) Blair Patten
- (Tasmania) Madeline Westland
- (Victoria (state)) Kristina Bates
- (Victoria (state)) Sarah Breen
- (Victoria (state)) Anna Moore
- (Victoria (state)) Hayley Padget
- (Victoria (state)) Isabelle Peskett
- (Victoria (state)) Samantha Snow
- (Western Australia) Kirstie Denning
- (Western Australia) Penny Squibb
