= 2012 Under 21 Men's Australian Hockey Championships =

Tournament details
- City: Hobart
- Teams: 8
- Venue: Tasmanian Hockey Centre

Final positions
- Champions: (Queensland) QLD
- Runner-up: (Western Australia) WA
- Third place: (New South Wales) NSW

Tournament statistics
- Matches played: 36
- Goals scored: 185 (5.14 per match)
- Top scorer: (New South Wales) Blake Govers (12 goals)

The 2012 Under 21 Men's Australian Hockey Championships was a men's field hockey tournament. The competition was held in the Tasmanian city of Hobart.

Queensland won the gold medal after defeating Western Australia 3–0 in the final. Following a 5–5 draw, New South Wales won the bronze medal with a higher percentage of games won, finishing ahead of Tasmania.

== Competition format ==
The tournament was played in a single round-robin format, with each team facing each other once. Final placings after the pool matches determined playoff positions.

The bottom four teams moved to the classification round. Teams played in crossover matches, with the losing teams playing off for seventh place, and the winners for fifth. Meanwhile, the top four teams contested the medal round, with teams contesting in semi-finals. The winners played in the gold medal match, while the losers played off for bronze.

== Teams ==
- (Australian Capital Territory) ACT
- (South Australia) SA
- (New South Wales) NSW
- (Tasmania) TAS
- (Northern Territory) NT
- (Victoria (state)) VIC
- (Queensland) QLD
- (Western Australia) WA

== Results ==
All times are local (AEST).

=== Preliminary round ===
Pos	Team	Pld	W	D	L	GF	GA	GD	Pts	Qualification
1	(Queensland) QLD	7	5	2	0	26	13	+13	17	Semi-finals
2	(New South Wales) NSW	7	5	1	1	28	15	+13	16	Semi-finals
3	(Western Australia) WA	7	5	0	2	19	14	+5	15	Semi-finals
4	(Tasmania) TAS	7	2	2	3	18	19	−1	8	Semi-finals
5	(Victoria (state)) VIC	7	2	1	4	15	16	−1	7	
6	(South Australia) SA	7	2	0	5	15	23	−8	6	
7	(Northern Territory) NT	7	1	2	4	9	16	−7	5	
8	(Australian Capital Territory) ACT	7	1	2	4	13	27	−14	5	

Source: Hockey Australia
Rules for classification: 1) points; 2) matches won; 3) head-to-head result; 4) goal difference; 5) goals for; 6) field goals scored.

==== Fixtures ====
10 July 2012
09:00

WA (Western Australia)	2–3	(New South Wales) NSW
Zalewski; Clarke 45'	Report	Elliot 16'; Ogilvie 31'; Willott 34'

10 July 2012
11:00

SA (South Australia)	2–4	(Queensland) QLD
Oliver 4'; Joyce 45'	Report	Douglas 35', 36'; Hathaway 48'; Mathiesen 49'

10 July 2012
13:00

ACT (Australian Capital Territory)	2–2	(Northern Territory) NT
Palmer 8'; Jewell 50'	Report	Abbott 13'; Hullick 37'

10 July 2012
15:00

TAS (Tasmania)	4–2	(Victoria (state)) VIC
Middleton 23'; Phimmanarch 31'; Arthur 51'; Mackey 58'	Report	Sherren 9'; Coleman 13'

11 July 2012
09:00

NSW (New South Wales)	6–2	(South Australia) SA
Govers 6', 59'; Elliot 13', 24', 30'; Dawson 33'	Report	Joyce 8'; White 53'

11 July 2012
11:00

VIC (Victoria (state))	1–1	(Northern Territory) NT
Seccull 2'	Report	Gleeson 24'

11 July 2012
13:00

TAS (Tasmania)	1–1	(Australian Capital Territory) ACT
Bolton 47'	Report	Palmer 70'

11 July 2012
15:00

QLD (Queensland)	5–2	(Western Australia) WA
Whetton 4'; Douglas 7', 45'; D. Beale 28', 56'	Report	Clarke 8', 70'

13 July 2012
09:00

VIC (Victoria (state))	5–3	(Australian Capital Territory) ACT
Matthews 21'; Sinclair 25'; Seccull 38', 56'; Walton 46'	Report	Jewell 7'; S. Shepherd 36', 58'

13 July 2012
11:00

NSW (New South Wales)	4–4	(Queensland) QLD
Willott 7'; Elliot 27'; Walters 39'; Govers 65'	Report	Mathiesen 15'; Whetton 23', 66'; Douglas 69'

13 July 2012
13:00

WA (Western Australia)	4–0	(South Australia) SA
Ewing 7', 14'; Zalewski 27', 43'	Report

13 July 2012
15:00

NT (Northern Territory)	1–5	(Tasmania) TAS
Abbott 46'	Report	Middleton 20', 45'; Arthur 49'; Phimmanarch 58'; Edwards 62'

14 July 2012
09:00

QLD (Queensland)	1–0	(Victoria (state)) VIC
Rintala 12'	Report

14 July 2012
11:00

NT (Northern Territory)	1–3	(Western Australia) WA
Haami-Jones 57'	Report	Durrell 2'; Clarke 51'; Zalewski 70'

14 July 2012
13:00

SA (South Australia)	5–2	(Tasmania) TAS
Greenshields 12'; Joyce 19'; Mitchell 41', 58'; Oliver 49'	Report	Cerulus 9'; Bolton 52'

14 July 2012
15:00

ACT (Australian Capital Territory)	2–8	(New South Wales) NSW
Borrett 46'; Palmer 65'	Report	Bourke 5', 55'; Walters 7', 30'; Govers 8'; Willis 21'; Ogilvie 57'; Eichorn 56'

16 July 2012
09:00

TAS (Tasmania)	3–3	(Queensland) QLD
Short 13'; Hathaway 41'; Posselt 49'	Report	Bolton 15'; Shaw 29'; Middleton 57'

16 July 2012
11:00

WA (Western Australia)	2–1	(Australian Capital Territory) ACT
Robertson 28'; Brown 69'	Report	Palmer 44'

16 July 2012
13:00

NT (Northern Territory)	3–1	(New South Wales) NSW
Bougoukas 16'; Lockley 49'; Hayward 70+'	Report	Willis 6'

16 July 2012
15:00

VIC (Victoria (state))	4–2	(South Australia) SA
Hammond 20'; Coleman 39'; Gilmour 44'; Cross 48'	Report	Joyce 15', 53'

17 July 2012
09:00

ACT (Australian Capital Territory)	3–2	(South Australia) SA
Wallace 45'; S. Shepherd 61'; Palmer 66'	Report	B. Craig 58'; Roberts 63'

17 July 2012
11:00

NSW (New South Wales)	4–1	(Tasmania) TAS
Govers 15', 27'; Bourke 64'; Ogilvie 65'	Report	Middleton 5'

17 July 2012
13:00

WA (Western Australia)	3–2	(Victoria (state)) VIC
Clarke 22', 31', 59'	Report	Crowley 1'; Sinclair 26'

17 July 2012
15:00

QLD (Queensland)	2–1	(Northern Territory) NT
Mathiesen 17', 53'	Report	Haami-Jones 69'

18 July 2012
09:00

TAS (Tasmania)	2–3	(Western Australia) WA
Edwards 9', 14'	Report	Robertson 29'; Hall 32'; Brown 54'

18 July 2012
11:00

NSW (New South Wales)	2–1	(Victoria (state)) VIC
Govers 32', 40'	Report	T. Craig 52'

18 July 2012
13:00

SA (South Australia)	2–0	(Northern Territory) NT
Joyce 33', 57'	Report

18 July 2012
15:00

QLD (Queensland)	7–1	(Australian Capital Territory) ACT
D. Beale 23'; Rintala 32', 56'; Quan 34'; Bell 49'; Boyde 53'; Douglas 67'	Report	L. Shepherd 41'

=== Classification round ===
==== Fifth to eighth place classification ====
Crossover
20 July 2012
(Victoria (state)) VIC	5
(Australian Capital Territory) ACT	1
20 July 2012
(South Australia) SA	2
(Northern Territory) NT	3

Fifth Place
21 July 2012
(Victoria (state)) VIC	2
(Northern Territory) NT	1
Seventh Place
21 July 2012
(Australian Capital Territory) ACT	3
(South Australia) SA	3

===== Crossover =====
20 July 2012
09:00

VIC (Victoria (state))	5–1	(Australian Capital Territory) ACT
Hammond 21'; Cowley 40'; Seccull 51'; Cross 60'; Gildea 67'	Report	Wallace 9'

Umpires:
Andrew Just (AUS)
Nicholas Marshall (AUS)

20 July 2012
11:00

SA (South Australia)	2–3	(Northern Territory) NT
Joyce 4', 61'	Report	Haami-Jones 23'; Hayward 31'; Abbott 55'

Umpires:
Andrew Hickman (AUS)
Benjamin Secrett (AUS)

===== Seventh and eighth place =====
21 July 2012
09:00

ACT (Australian Capital Territory)	3–3	(South Australia) SA
Wallace 46', 67'; English 56'	Report	Oliver 6'; Mitchell 29'; Joyce 62'

Umpires:
Simon Moore (AUS)
Gilbert Gough-Fuller (AUS)

===== Fifth and sixth place =====
21 July 2012
11:00

VIC (Victoria (state))	2–1	(Northern Territory) NT
Gildea 22', 47'	Report	Abbott 41'

Umpires:
Benjamin Secrett (AUS)
Lee Nugawela (AUS)

==== First to fourth place classification ====
Semi-finals
20 July 2012
(Queensland) QLD	2
(Tasmania) TAS	0
20 July 2012
(New South Wales) NSW	3
(Western Australia) WA	4

Gold medal
21 July 2012
(Queensland) QLD	3
(Western Australia) WA	0
Bronze medal
21 July 2012
(Tasmania) TAS	5
(New South Wales) NSW	5

===== Semi-finals =====
20 July 2012
13:00

QLD (Queensland)	2–0	(Tasmania) TAS
D. Beale 42'; Douglas 45'	Report

Umpires:
Gilbert Gough-Fuller (AUS)
Lee Nugawela (AUS)

20 July 2012
15:00

NSW (New South Wales)	3–4	(Western Australia) WA
Elliot 39', 60'; Bourke 62'	Report	Robertson 4'; Zalewski 30', 32'; Ewing 44'

Umpires:
Levi Stephen (AUS)
Simon Moore (AUS)

===== Third and fourth place =====
21 July 2012
13:00

TAS (Tasmania)	5–5	(New South Wales) NSW
Arthur 11'; Bolton 25', 55'; Read 35'; Middleton 59'	Report	Govers 13', 16', 29', 42'; Walters 17'

Umpires:
Scott O'Reilly (AUS)
Levi Stephen (AUS)

===== Final =====
21 July 2012
15:00

QLD (Queensland)	3–0	(Western Australia) WA
Bell 12'; Whetton 41'; Rintala 46'	Report

Umpires:
Simon Cross (AUS)
Scott Embry (AUS)

== Statistics ==
=== Final standings ===
Pos	Team	Pld	W	D	L	GF	GA	GD	Pts	Qualification
1st place, gold medalist(s)	(Queensland) QLD	9	7	2	0	31	13	+18	23	Gold medal
2nd place, silver medalist(s)	(Western Australia) WA	9	6	0	3	23	20	+3	18	Silver medal
3rd place, bronze medalist(s)	(New South Wales) NSW	9	5	2	2	36	24	+12	17	Bronze medal
4	(Tasmania) TAS	9	2	3	4	23	26	−3	9	
5	(Victoria (state)) VIC	9	4	1	4	22	18	+4	13	
6	(Northern Territory) NT	9	2	2	5	13	20	−7	8	
7	(South Australia) SA	9	2	1	6	20	29	−9	7	
8	(Australian Capital Territory) ACT	9	1	3	5	17	35	−18	6	

Source: Hockey Australia

=== Goalscorers ===
There were 185 goals scored in 36 matches, for an average of 5.14 goals per match.

12 goals

- (New South Wales) Blake Govers

10 goals

- (South Australia) Cameron Joyce

7 goals

- (New South Wales) Jack Elliot
- (Queensland) Justin Douglas
- (Western Australia) Bradley Clarke

6 goals

- (Tasmania) Dougal Middleton
- (Western Australia) Aran Zalewski

5 goals

- (Australian Capital Territory) Andrew Palmer
- (Tasmania) Angus Bolton

4 goals

- (Australian Capital Territory) Jack Wallace
- (New South Wales) Nathan Bourke
- (New South Wales) Joshua Walters
- (Northern Territory) Dwayne Abbott
- (Queensland) Daniel Beale
- (Queensland) Daniel Mathiesen
- (Queensland) Aidan Rintala
- (Queensland) Jacob Whetton
- (Victoria (state)) Adam Seccull

3 goals

- (Australian Capital Territory) Stuart Shepherd
- (New South Wales) Flynn Ogilvie
- (Northern Territory) Tarrant Haami-Jones
- (South Australia) Daniel Mitchell
- (South Australia) Alistair Oliver
- (Tasmania) Kieron Arthur
- (Tasmania) Jeremy Edwards
- (Victoria (state)) Kyle Gildea
- (Western Australia) Sebastian Ewing
- (Western Australia) Daniel Robertson

2 goals

- (Australian Capital Territory) James Jewell
- (New South Wales) Matthew Willis
- (New South Wales) Jordan Willott
- (Northern Territory) Jeremy Hayward
- (Queensland) Robert Bell
- (Queensland) Jake Hathaway
- (Tasmania) Alexander Phimmanarch
- (Victoria (state)) Christopher Coleman
- (Victoria (state)) Timothy Cross
- (Victoria (state)) Tyler Crowley
- (Victoria (state)) Casey Hammond
- (Victoria (state)) Thomas Sinclair
- (Western Australia) Sheldon Brown

1 goal

- (Australian Capital Territory) Layne Borrett
- (Australian Capital Territory) Keagan English
- (Australian Capital Territory) Lewis Shepherd
- (New South Wales) Matthew Dawson
- (New South Wales) Kyle Eichhorn
- (Northern Territory) Ross Bougoukas
- (Northern Territory) Brodie Gleeson
- (Northern Territory) Jamie Hullick
- (Northern Territory) Adrian Lockley
- (Queensland) Scott Boyde
- (Queensland) Kane Posselt
- (Queensland) Ethan Quan
- (Queensland) Lewis Short
- (South Australia) Benjamin Craig
- (South Australia) Nathan Greenshields
- (South Australia) Dylan Roberts
- (South Australia) Cameron White
- (Tasmania) Maxwell Cerulus
- (Tasmania) Kurt Mackey
- (Tasmania) Benjamin Read
- (Tasmania) William Shaw
- (Victoria (state)) Thomas Craig
- (Victoria (state)) William Gilmour
- (Victoria (state)) Lewis Matthews
- (Victoria (state)) Jake Sherren
- (Victoria (state)) Byron Walton
- (Western Australia) Steven Durrell
- (Western Australia) Ross Hall
