= Ehren Hazell =

Australian field hockey player

Personal information
- Born: 20 April 1999 (age 27) Tamworth, New South Wales, Australia

Sport
- Sport: Field hockey
- Position: Forward
Senior career
Years	Team	Caps	Goals
2019–2022	NSW Pride	13	7
2022–	Fremantle Cockburn HC	99	114
2023–	Tassie Tigers	23	17
National team
Years	Team	Caps	Goals
2017–2019	Australia U–21	23	(4)
Medal record
Men's field hockey
Representing Australia
Sultan of Johor Cup
Gold medal – first place	2017 Johor Bahru
Bronze medal – third place	2018 Johor Bahru

Ehren Hazell (born 20 April 1999) is a field hockey player from Australia.

He competes in Hockey Australia's premier domestic competition, the ONE Active Hockey One League.

== Personal life ==
Hazell was born in Tamworth, New South Wales.

== Hockey One ==
Throughout has career, Hazell has represented sides in three Australian states, New South Wales, Tasmania and Western Australia.

During his youth, he represented the Workies Hockey Club in Tamworth. Following a move to Sydney, he continued his club representation with the Norwest Strikers. During this time, he represented New South Wales in domestic national championships, including two seasons with the NSW Pride in the Hockey One.

In 2022 Hazell made the move to Perth to compete in the Hockey WA Premier One competition following his inclusion in the Australian Development Squad. In the league, he competes for the Fremantle Cockburn HC.

Following his move to Western Australia, Hazell made the decision to transfer teams in the Hockey One, moving to the Tassie Tigers for the 2023 season. He has been an integral member of the squad since, becoming one of the team's highest goalscorers.

== National teams ==
=== Under–21 ===
Hazell has also represented Australia at international level. He was a member of the Australian U–21 side, the Burras, at the 2017 Sultan of Johor Cup. He continued to represent the national junior team until 2019, appearing at two more editions of the Sultan of Johor Cup and an Eight–Nations Tournament in Madrid.

== Career statistics ==
Appearances and goals by club, season and competition
Club	Season	League			Other		Total	
Club	Season	Division	Apps	Goals	Apps	Goals	Apps	Goals
NSW Pride	2019	ONE Active Hockey One	3	1	—		3	1
NSW Pride	2022	ONE Active Hockey One	8	4	2	2	10	6
NSW Pride	Total		11	5	2	2	13	7
Fremantle Cockburn HC	2022	Hockey WA Premier One	17	20	—		17	20
Fremantle Cockburn HC	2023	Hockey WA Premier One	13	18	—		13	18
Fremantle Cockburn HC	2024	Hockey WA Premier One	22	26	—		22	26
Fremantle Cockburn HC	2025	Hockey WA Premier One	25	27	—		25	27
Fremantle Cockburn HC	2026	Hockey WA Premier One	22	23	—		22	23
Fremantle Cockburn HC	Total		99	114	—		99	114
Tassie Tigers	2023	ONE Active Hockey One	8	1	—		8	1
Tassie Tigers	2024	ONE Active Hockey One	6	4	—		6	4
Tassie Tigers	2025	ONE Active Hockey One	7	7	—		7	7
Tassie Tigers	2026	ONE Active Hockey One	2	5	—		2	5
Tassie Tigers	Total		23	17	—		23	17
Career total			133	136	2	2	135	138
