= Tom Harvie =

Australia field hockey player

Personal information
- Full name: Thomas Harvie
- Born: 1 February 2000 (age 26) Dardanup, Western Australia, Australia

Sport
- Sport: Field hockey
- Position: Midfield
Senior career
| Years | Team | Caps | Goals |
| 2022– | Perth Thundersticks | - | - |
National team
| Years | Team | Caps | Goals |
| 2018–2018 | Australia U–18 | 7 | (8) |
| 2019–2019 | Australia U–21 | 5 | (1) |
| 2025– | Australia | 0 | (0) |
Medal record
Men's field hockey
Representing Australia

Thomas 'Tom' Harvie (born 1 February 2000) is a field hockey player from Australia.

== Personal life ==
Tom Harvie was born and raised in Dardanup, Western Australia.

Harvie comes from a hockey family, with his older brother Jake also playing international field hockey for Australia. His maternal grandfather, Gordon Pearce, is also a former international hockey player, having represented the Kookaburras at three Olympic Games.

He is a scholarship holder at the Western Australian Institute of Sport.

== Career ==
=== Domestic league ===
Hailing from Western Australia, Harvie plays for the Westside Wolves. He is a member of the club's senior squad in the Hockey WA Premier League competition. At national level, he represents the Perth Thundersticks in Hockey Australia's premier domestic competition, the Liberty Hockey One League. He has been a member of the squad since 2022.

=== Under–18 ===
Throughout 2018, Harvie was a member of the Australian U–18 side. He helped the team to Youth Olympic Games qualification at the Oceania Qualification Tournament in Port Moresby.

=== Under–21 ===
Harvie made his first and only appearance for the Australian U–21 side, the Burras, in 2019. He was a member of the squad at an Eight–Nations Invitational Tournament in Madrid.

=== Australia ===
Following a standout Hockey One season in 2024, Harvie was named to the wider Kookaburras squad for 2025. He has since been named to make his debut during the Sydney leg of the 2024–25 FIH Pro League.
