= Kiran Arunasalam =

Australian field hockey player

Yung Garlicnannn
Personal information
- Born: 1 June 1995 (age 31) Melbourne, Victoria, Australia

Sport
- Sport: Field hockey
- Position: Forward
National team
Years	Team	Caps	Goals
2017–	Australia		-
- Updated on 30 November 2017

Kiran Arunasalam (born 1 June 1995) is an Australian field hockey player who plays as a forward.

== Life and career ==
Arunasalam was born on 1 June 1995 in Melbourne to Malaysian Indian parents who migrated from Malaysia to Australia in the 1980s. His family traces back its roots to the Indian town of Tirupattur, Tamil Nadu. He picked up the sport at the age of four.

Arunasalam was first selected in the Australian junior team in 2015. He was part of the Australian squad that won the 2016 Sultan of Johor Cup in Malaysia. He was also part of the national team that finished fourth at the 2016 Men's Hockey Junior World Cup in India. He made his senior team debut in 2017.

As of 2016, Arunasalam studies marketing at the Swinburne University in Melbourne.
