= Lachlan Busiko =

Australian field hockey player

Personal information
- Born: 13 January 1998 (age 28) Naracoorte, South Australia

Sport
- Sport: Field hockey
- Position: Defender
Senior career
Years	Team	Caps	Goals
2017–2018	SA Hotshots	10	0
2019–	Adelaide Fire	2	1
National team
Years	Team	Caps	Goals
2017–2019	Australia U–21	12	(1)
Medal record
Men's field hockey
Representing Australia
Sultan of Johor Cup
Gold medal – first place	2017 Johor Bahru	Team
Bronze medal – third place	2018 Johor Bahru	Team

Lachlan Busiko (born 13 January 1998) is a field hockey player from Australia.

== Personal life ==
Lachlan Busiko was born in Naracoorte, South Australia and raised in Benayeo, Victoria near Apsley, Victoria.

He is a current scholarship holder at the South Australian Institute of Sport (SASI).

== Career ==
=== Junior national team ===
In 2017, Busiko made his debut for the Australia U–21 side, the 'Burras', at the Sultan of Johor Cup.

Busiko again appeared at the Sultan of Johor Cup in 2018, winning a bronze medal with the team.

In 2019, Busiko was named to the national junior squad for the third time, as well as being named in the team for the 2019 Sultan of Johor Cup.

=== Adelaide Fire ===
Following the establishment of the Adelaide Fire in 2019, Lachlan Busiko was presented as the headline player for the men's team. He was also named as team captain for the inaugural tournament of the Sultana Bran Hockey One League, Australia's new premier domestic competition.
