= 2018 Men's Australian Hockey League =

Australian field hockey tournament

Tournament details
- Host country: Australia
- City: Gold Coast (finals venue)
- Dates: 6 – 28 October
- Teams: 8
- Venue: 9 (in 9 host cities)

Final positions
- Champions: (Queensland) QLD Blades (10th title)
- Runner-up: (New South Wales) NSW Waratahs
- Third place: (Tasmania) Tassie Tigers

Tournament statistics
- Matches played: 24
- Goals scored: 208 (8.67 per match)
- Top scorer: (New South Wales) Blake Govers (11 goals)
- Best player: (Queensland) Jake Whetton

The 2018 Men's Australian Hockey League was the 26th edition of the men's field hockey tournament. The 2018 edition of the tournament was held between 6 – 28 October, and featured a new format from previous editions.

The finals phase of the 2018 tournament was held in the Queensland city of the Gold Coast, from the 25 – 28 October.

QLD Blades won the tournament for a record tenth time after defeating NSW Waratahs 5–3 in the gold-medal match. Tassie Tigers claimed the bronze medal after defeating the Canberra Lakers 1–0.

== Competition format ==
Unlike previous editions of the Men's Australian Hockey League, the 2018 edition will include a very different format. Instead of the tournament being held at a single venue, the teams will play at least one home and away match during the pool stage, before converging on a singular venue for the Classification Round.

The teams will be divided into two Pool A and Pool B, both consisting of four teams, with each team playing each other once. The teams will then progress to the Classification round, with each team playing a qualifying match, before progressing to either the fifth to eighth place playoffs, or the first to fourth place playoffs.

== Participating teams ==
- (Australian Capital Territory) Canberra Lakers
- (New South Wales) NSW Waratahs
- (Northern Territory) NT Stingers
- (Queensland) QLD Blades
- (South Australia) SA Hotshots
- (Tasmania) Tassie Tigers
- (Victoria (state)) VIC Vikings
- (Western Australia) WA Thundersticks

== Venues ==
| Sydney | Melbourne | Perth |
|---|---|---|
| Sydney Olympic Park | State Netball and Hockey Centre | Perth Hockey Stadium |
| Capacity: 8,000 | Capacity: 8,000 | Capacity: 6,000 |
| Adelaide | 2018 Men's Australian Hockey League is located in Australia | |
| State Hockey Centre | 2018 Men's Australian Hockey League is located in Australia | |
| Capacity: 4,000 | 2018 Men's Australian Hockey League is located in Australia | |
| Brisbane | 2018 Men's Australian Hockey League is located in Australia | |
| Queensland State Hockey Centre | 2018 Men's Australian Hockey League is located in Australia | |
| Capacity: 1,000 | 2018 Men's Australian Hockey League is located in Australia | |
| Canberra | Hobart | Darwin |
| National Hockey Centre | Tasmanian Hockey Centre | Marrara Hockey Centre |
Gold Coast
Finals Venue: Gold Coast Hockey Centre

== Results ==
=== Preliminary round ===
==== Pool A ====
| Pos | Team | Pld | W | WD | LD | L | GF | GA | GD | Pts |
|---|---|---|---|---|---|---|---|---|---|---|
| 1 | (Tasmania) Tassie Tigers | 3 | 3 | 0 | 0 | 0 | 15 | 6 | +9 | 15 |
| 2 | (Australian Capital Territory) Canberra Lakers | 3 | 2 | 0 | 0 | 1 | 9 | 8 | +1 | 10 |
| 3 | (Queensland) QLD Blades | 3 | 1 | 0 | 0 | 2 | 9 | 14 | −5 | 5 |
| 4 | (New South Wales) NSW Waratahs | 3 | 0 | 0 | 0 | 3 | 9 | 14 | −5 | 0 |

Updated to match(es) played on 6 October 2018. Source: hockey.org.au

6 October 2018
16:00 (AEST)

| NSW Waratahs (New South Wales) | 4–6 | (Queensland) QLD Blades |
|---|---|---|
| Brand 21', 21'; B. Govers 40', 47' | Report | Anderson 16', 55'; Rintala 22', 22', 24'; D. Wotherspoon 25' |

Sydney Olympic Park, Sydney
Umpires:
Zeke Newman (AUS)
Ben de Young (AUS)

6 October 2018
19:00 (AEST)

| Tassie Tigers (Tasmania) | 5–1 | (Australian Capital Territory) Canberra Lakers |
|---|---|---|
| Ockenden 7', 7'; Arthur 10'; McCambridge 42', 42' | Report | Day 51' |

Tasmanian Hockey Centre, Hobart
Umpires:
Ben Hocking (AUS)
Adam Kearns (AUS)

14 October 2018
14:30 (AEST)

| Tassie Tigers (Tasmania) | 5–4 | (New South Wales) NSW Waratahs |
|---|---|---|
| Read 7'; McCambridge 50', 50'; Dick 60', 60' | Report | McEwen 2'; Hayes 15', 55', 55' |

Tasmanian Hockey Centre, Hobart
Umpires:
Zeke Newman (AUS)
Stephen Rogers (AUS)

14 October 2018
14:30 (AEST)

| Canberra Lakers (Australian Capital Territory) | 5–2 | (Queensland) QLD Blades |
|---|---|---|
| Day 2', 3'; Backhus 40', 40'; Kershaw 54' | Report | Crane 51', 52' |

National Hockey Centre, Canberra
Umpires:
Stirling Sharpe (AUS)
David Bridgford (AUS)

20 October 2018
15:30 (AEST)

| Canberra Lakers (Australian Capital Territory) | 3–1 | (New South Wales) NSW Waratahs |
|---|---|---|
| Turner 10', 10'; Shepherd 34' | Report | Hayes 11' |

National Hockey Centre, Canberra
Umpires:
Stirling Sharpe (AUS)
David Bridgford (AUS)

20 October 2018
20:00 (AEST)

| QLD Blades (Queensland) | 1–5 | (Tasmania) Tassie Tigers |
|---|---|---|
| Douglas 13' | Report | Arthur 30'; Smith 53'; McCambridge 60', 60', 60' |

Queensland State Hockey Centre, Brisbane
Umpires:
Aaron Gotting (AUS)
Ben de Young (AUS)

==== Pool B ====
| Pos | Team | Pld | W | WD | LD | L | GF | GA | GD | Pts |
|---|---|---|---|---|---|---|---|---|---|---|
| 1 | (Western Australia) WA Thundersticks | 3 | 3 | 0 | 0 | 0 | 19 | 8 | +11 | 15 |
| 2 | (Victoria (state)) VIC Vikings | 3 | 2 | 0 | 0 | 1 | 27 | 8 | +19 | 10 |
| 3 | (South Australia) SA Hotshots | 3 | 1 | 0 | 0 | 2 | 8 | 18 | −10 | 5 |
| 4 | (Northern Territory) NT Stingers | 3 | 0 | 0 | 0 | 3 | 7 | 27 | −20 | 0 |

Source: hockey.org.au

7 October 2018
15:30 (ACST)

| SA Hotshots (South Australia) | 3–5 | (Western Australia) WA Thundersticks |
|---|---|---|
| Hetem 3', 3', 41' | Report | Gavranich 42', 42', 59', 59', 59' |

State Hockey Centre, Adelaide
Umpires:
Tim Pullman (AUS)
Nathan Jennings (AUS)

7 October 2018
18:30 (ACST)

| NT Stingers (Northern Territory) | 4–12 | (Victoria (state)) VIC Vikings |
|---|---|---|
| Hullick 2'; Lockley 31', 31'; Wallin 44' | Report | Scanlon 4', 9', 30+'; Knee 8', 10', 10'; Pollard 10', 10'; Kleinschmidt 33', 33', 54'; Hendry 37' |

Marrara Hockey Centre, Darwin
Umpires:
Stephen Versteegh (AUS)
Stephen Rogers (AUS)

13 October 2018
14:00 (AEST)

| VIC Vikings (Victoria (state)) | 2–4 | (Western Australia) WA Thundersticks |
|---|---|---|
| Hendry 10'; Ford 28' | Report | Gabriel 14', 14'; Geers 41', 42' |

State Netball Hockey Centre, Melbourne
Umpires:
Timothy Sheahan (AUS)
Ben Hocking (AUS)

13 October 2018
18:30 (ACST)

| SA Hotshots (South Australia) | 5–0 | (Northern Territory) NT Stingers |
|---|---|---|
| Oliver 4', 4'; Gleeson 12', 37', 37' | Report |

State Hockey Centre, Adelaide
Umpires:
Tim Pullman (AUS)
Nathan Jennings (AUS)

20 October 2018
18:00 (AWST)

| WA Thundersticks (Western Australia) | 10–3 | (Northern Territory) NT Stingers |
|---|---|---|
| Green 14'; Rasmussen 15', 15'; Gavranich 24', 24'; Robertson 43', 43'; Gabriel 48', 59', 59' | Report | Hullick 30'; Argent 32'; McDonald 55' |

Perth Hockey Stadium, Perth
Umpires:
Stephen Versteegh (AUS)
Matthew Claxton (AUS)

21 October 2018
15:30 (AEST)

| VIC Vikings (Victoria (state)) | 13–0 | (South Australia) SA Hotshots |
|---|---|---|
| Randhawa 15', 22'; Hendry 17', 17'; Ford 24', 34', 54', 59', 59'; Cross 29', 29'; Webster 31', 31' | Report |

State Netball Hockey Centre, Melbourne
Umpires:
James Unkles (AUS)
Timothy Sheahan (AUS)

=== Classification round ===
Quarterfinals
25 October 2018
(Tasmania) Tassie Tigers | 11
(Northern Territory) NT Stingers | 0
25 October 2018
(Victoria (state)) VIC Vikings | 5
(Queensland) QLD Blades | 6
25 October 2018
(Australian Capital Territory) Canberra Lakers | 7
(South Australia) SA Hotshots | 0
25 October 2018
(Western Australia) WA Thundersticks | 2
(New South Wales) NSW Waratahs | 10

Semi-finals
27 October 2018
(Tasmania) Tassie Tigers | 3
(Queensland) QLD Blades | 9
27 October 2018
(Australian Capital Territory) Canberra Lakers | 1
(New South Wales) NSW Waratahs | 10

Final
28 October 2018
(Queensland) QLD Blades | 5
(New South Wales) NSW Waratahs | 3
Third-place match
28 October 2018
(Tasmania) Tassie Tigers | 1
(Australian Capital Territory) Canberra Lakers | 0

==== Quarterfinals ====
25 October 2018
13:00 (AEST)

| Canberra Lakers (Australian Capital Territory) | 7–0 | (South Australia) SA Hotshots |
|---|---|---|
| N. Gupte 6'; Turner 23', 23', 57', 57', 57'; B. Staines 55' | Report |

Gold Coast Hockey Centre, Gold Coast
Umpires:
James Unkles (AUS)
Adam Kearns (AUS)

25 October 2018
14:45 (AEST)

| Tassie Tigers (Tasmania) | 11–0 | (Northern Territory) NT Stingers |
|---|---|---|
| Ockenden 9', 9', 31', 31'; Beltz 37', 37'; Edwards 43', 43'; Dick 53'; Read 57', 57' | Report |

Gold Coast Hockey Centre, Gold Coast
Umpires:
Timothy Sheahan (AUS)
Nathan Jennings (AUS)

25 October 2018
16:30 (AEST)

| WA Thundersticks (Western Australia) | 2–10 | (New South Wales) NSW Waratahs |
|---|---|---|
| Gerrard 18'; Green 57' | Report | K. Govers 7'; T. Craig 29'; Brand 33', 33'; Hayes 35'; Lovett 36'; Ogilvie 50'; B. Govers 59', 59', 59' |

Gold Coast Hockey Centre, Gold Coast
Umpires:
Stephen Rogers (AUS)
Ben Hocking (AUS)

25 October 2018
18:15 (AEST)

| VIC Vikings (Victoria (state)) | 5–6 | (Queensland) QLD Blades |
|---|---|---|
| Simmonds 48', 60', 60+'; Ephraums 49', 49' | Report | Boyde 16', 16'; B. Wotherspoon 25'; Whetton 27', 27', 27' |

Gold Coast Hockey Centre, Gold Coast
Umpires:
Tim Pullman (AUS)
Zeke Newman (AUS)

==== Fifth to eighth place classification ====
Crossover
27 October 2018
(Northern Territory) NT Stingers | 0
(Victoria (state)) VIC Vikings | 11
27 October 2018
(South Australia) SA Hotshots | 4
(Western Australia) WA Thundersticks | 3

Fifth-place match
28 October 2018
(Victoria (state)) VIC Vikings | 8
(South Australia) SA Hotshots | 1
Seventh-place match
28 October 2018
(Northern Territory) NT Stingers | 2
(Western Australia) WA Thundersticks | 3

===== Crossover =====
October 2018
08:45 (AEST)

| NT Stingers (Northern Territory) | 0–11 | (Victoria (state)) VIC Vikings |
|---|---|---|
| | Report | Philpott 4', 4'; Kleinschmidt 29', 29'; Arunasalam 44', 44'; Pollard 47'; Ephraums 55', 58', 58', 58' |

Gold Coast Hockey Centre, Gold Coast
Umpires:
Nathan Jennings (AUS)
Stephen Rogers (AUS)

October 2018
10:30 (AEST)

| SA Hotshots (South Australia) | 4–3 | (Western Australia) WA Thundersticks |
|---|---|---|
| Hetem 27', 27'; Larwood 54', 54' | Report | Robertson 41'; Gabriel 41', 41' |

Gold Coast Hockey Centre, Gold Coast
Umpires:
Timothy Sheahan (AUS)
James Unkles (AUS)

===== Seventh and eighth place =====
October 2018
10:30 (AEST)

| NT Stingers (Northern Territory) | 2–3 | (Western Australia) WA Thundersticks |
|---|---|---|
| Wallin 29', 29' | Report | Gavranich 5', 5'; Harvie 11' |

Gold Coast Hockey Centre, Gold Coast
Umpires:
James Unkles (AUS)
Timothy Sheahan (AUS)

===== Fifth and sixth place =====
October 2018
10:30 (AEST)

| VIC Vikings (Victoria (state)) | 8–1 | (South Australia) SA Hotshots |
|---|---|---|
| Webster 6'; Scanlon 21'; Ephraums 26', 26'; Pollard 38', 38'; Kleinschmidt 48', 48' | Report | Larwood 14' |

Gold Coast Hockey Centre, Gold Coast
Umpires:
Adam Kearns (AUS)
Zeke Newman (AUS)

==== First to fourth place classification ====
===== Semi-finals =====
27 October 2018
15:30 (AEST)

| Tassie Tigers (Tasmania) | 3–9 | (Queensland) QLD Blades |
|---|---|---|
| McCambridge 55', 55'; Welch 57' | Report | Weyer 2', 2', 48'; Rintala 18', 45', 45'; Taylor 19', 19', 52' |

Gold Coast Hockey Centre, Gold Coast
Umpires:
Zeke Newman (AUS)
Ben Hocking (AUS)

27 October 2018
17:00 (AEST)

| Canberra Lakers (Australian Capital Territory) | 1–10 | (New South Wales) NSW Waratahs |
|---|---|---|
| Hawke 39' | Report | B. Govers 3', 3', 8', 52', 52'; Brand 25', 25'; Hayes 35'; Lovett 57', 57' |

Gold Coast Hockey Centre, Gold Coast
Umpires:
Adam Kearns (AUS)
Tim Pullman (AUS)

===== Third and fourth place =====
28 October 2018
14:00 (AEST)

| Tassie Tigers (Tasmania) | 1–0 | (Australian Capital Territory) Canberra Lakers |
|---|---|---|
| Arthur 29' | Report |

Gold Coast Hockey Centre, Gold Coast
Umpires:
Nathan Jennings (AUS)
Stephen Rogers (AUS)

===== Final =====
28 October 2018
17:00 (AEST)

| QLD Blades (Queensland) | 5–3 | (New South Wales) NSW Waratahs |
|---|---|---|
| D. Wotherspoon 19', 19', 47'; Beale 22', 22' | Report | B. Govers 21'; K. Govers 43', 43' |

Gold Coast Hockey Centre, Gold Coast
Umpires:
Tim Pullman (AUS)
Ben Hocking (AUS)

== Awards ==
| Player of the Tournament | Top Goalscorer | Player of the Final | Goalkeeper of the Tournament |
|---|---|---|---|
| (Queensland) Jake Whetton | (New South Wales) Blake Govers | (Queensland) Corey Weyer | (Australian Capital Territory) Andrew Charter |

== Statistics ==
=== Final standings ===
| Pos | Team | Pld | W | WD | LD | L | GF | GA | GD | Pts | Qualification |
|---|---|---|---|---|---|---|---|---|---|---|---|
| 1st place, gold medalist(s) | (Queensland) QLD Blades | 6 | 4 | 0 | 0 | 2 | 29 | 25 | +4 | 20 | Gold Medal |
| 2nd place, silver medalist(s) | (New South Wales) NSW Waratahs | 6 | 2 | 0 | 0 | 4 | 32 | 22 | +10 | 10 | Silver Medal |
| 3rd place, bronze medalist(s) | (Tasmania) Tassie Tigers | 6 | 5 | 0 | 0 | 1 | 30 | 15 | +15 | 25 | Bronze Medal |
| 4 | (Australian Capital Territory) Canberra Lakers | 6 | 3 | 0 | 0 | 3 | 17 | 19 | −2 | 15 | |
| 5 | (Victoria (state)) VIC Vikings | 6 | 4 | 0 | 0 | 2 | 51 | 15 | +36 | 20 | |
| 6 | (South Australia) SA Suns | 6 | 2 | 0 | 0 | 4 | 13 | 36 | −23 | 10 | |
| 7 | (Western Australia) WA Thundersticks | 6 | 4 | 0 | 0 | 2 | 27 | 24 | +3 | 20 | |
| 8 | (Northern Territory) NT Stingers | 6 | 0 | 0 | 0 | 6 | 9 | 52 | −43 | 0 | |

Source: Hockey Australia

=== Goalscorers ===
There were 208 goals scored in 24 matches, for an average of 8.67 goals per match.

11 goals

- (New South Wales) Blake Govers

9 goals

- (Tasmania) Samuel McCambridge
- (Western Australia) Dane Gavranich

8 goals

- (Victoria (state)) Nathan Ephraums

7 goals

- (Australian Capital Territory) Glenn Turner
- (Victoria (state)) Aaron Kleinschmidt
- (Western Australia) Jason Gabriel

6 goals

- (New South Wales) Timothy Brand
- (New South Wales) Jack Hayes
- (Queensland) Joel Rintala
- (Tasmania) Edward Ockenden
- (Victoria (state)) Russell Ford

5 goals

- (South Australia) Ross Hetem
- (Victoria (state)) Joshua Pollard

4 goals

- (Queensland) Dylan Wotherspoon
- (Victoria (state)) Max Hendry
- (Victoria (state)) Andrew Scanlon

3 goals

- (Australian Capital Territory) James Day
- (New South Wales) Kieran Govers
- (New South Wales) Kurt Lovett
- (Northern Territory) Ewan Wallin
- (Queensland) Jared Taylor
- (Queensland) Corey Weyer
- (Queensland) Jacob Whetton
- (South Australia) Brodie Gleeson
- (South Australia) Luke Larwood
- (Tasmania) Kieron Arthur
- (Tasmania) James Dick
- (Tasmania) Ben Read
- (Victoria (state)) James Knee
- (Victoria (state)) Joshua Simmonds
- (Victoria (state)) James Webster
- (Western Australia) Daniel Robertson

2 goals

- (Australian Capital Territory) Garry Backhus
- (Northern Territory) Jamie Hullick
- (Northern Territory) Adrian Lockley
- (Queensland) Jacob Anderson
- (Queensland) Daniel Beale
- (Queensland) Scott Boyde
- (Queensland) Oliver Crane
- (South Australia) Alastair Oliver
- (Tasmania) Hayden Beltz
- (Tasmania) Jeremy Edwards
- (Victoria (state)) Kiran Arunasalam
- (Victoria (state)) Tim Cross
- (Victoria (state)) Andrew Philpott
- (Victoria (state)) Jayshaan Randhawa
- (Western Australia) Tim Geers
- (Western Australia) Coby Green
- (Western Australia) Alec Rasmussen

1 goal

- (Australian Capital Territory) Niranjan Gupte
- (Australian Capital Territory) Jamie Hawke
- (Australian Capital Territory) Aaron Kershaw
- (Australian Capital Territory) Lewis Shepherd
- (Australian Capital Territory) Ben Staines
- (New South Wales) Thomas Craig
- (New South Wales) Nicholas McEwen
- (New South Wales) Flynn Ogilvie
- (Northern Territory) Matthew Argent
- (Northern Territory) Isaac McDonald
- (Queensland) Justin Douglas
- (Queensland) Blake Wotherspoon
- (Tasmania) Oliver Smith
- (Tasmania) Jack Welch
- (Western Australia) Frazer Gerrard
- (Western Australia) Jake Harvie

Source: Hockey Australia
