= Tassie Tigers =

Australian field hockey club

- Full name: Tassie Tigers
- League: Hockey One
- Founded: 17 April 2019; 7 years ago
- Home ground: Tasmanian Hockey Centre, Hobart, Australia (Capacity 4,000)
- Website: hockeytasmania.com.au

Tassie Tigers is an Australian professional field hockey club based in Hobart, Tasmania. The club joined the Australian Hockey League in 1992 as a men's team. In 2019, the Tassie Tigers expanded to encompass both Tasmanian men's and women's teams, Tassie Van Demons, as one of 7 clubs to compete in Hockey Australia's new premier domestic competition, Hockey One. In addition to that the tassie tigers once added Wyatt Benson as their coach

Tassie Tigers competed in the inaugural season of Hockey One, which was contested from late September through to mid November 2019.

In 2014 the Tigers became the AHL champions, drawing 2-2 with the WA Thundersticks in the gold medal game, but eventually winning 3-2 in penalty shoot-outs.

== Home Stadium ==
Tassie Tigers are based out of the Tasmanian Hockey Centre in Tasmania's capital city, Hobart. Throughout the Hockey One league, Tassie Tigers will play a number of home games at the stadium.

== 2025 Season ==
=== Round 1 ===
Tassie Tigers v HC Melbourne

The Bass Strait showdown ended in disappointment for the home fans as HC Melbourne men ran riot in the second half to claim a 5–2 win. Led by skipper Josh Beltz, Tassie made all the early running but only had Jack Welch’s converted field goal to show for a second quarter of utter domination. Leading 14-4 scoring opportunities, the home side were left to rue failing to capitalise on eight penalty corner chances. It was the only opening Melbourne needed as their man-to-man press smashed Tassie and was the catalyst for piling on five unanswered goals thereafter. Kookaburras star Nathan Ephraums kick started the fightback, before Nye Roberts’ brace and Dutch recruit Daniel Smits opened his Hockey One account from the set piece on three quarter time. Tigers’ youngsters Keenan Johnson and Lachie Rogers showed promise, but Melbourne put the result to bed when debutant Carlin Walker knocked home late on to continue the side’s love affair with playing in Hobart.

The women’s clash was even more dramatic, with HC Melbourne edging the Tigers 4–3 in a seven‑goal thriller. Tassie flew out of the blocks: Steph Kershaw converted a penalty corner after just two minutes, before Beth Dobbie netted a field goal and calmly slotted the conversion to make it 3–0 barely five minutes later in a hot start. Melbourne hit back after the first break when Hannah Cotter touched home at the far post after impressive build up play from Sammy Love. The Kiwi star rode a strong challenge to convert and cut the margin to one. With Kershaw unable to take the field in the second half, Melbourne got the match on their terms with Olivia Downes and Krissy Bates getting on top, and with the result hanging in the balance, Hannah Gravenall produced the winner in the final quarter, scoring from a courageous outside-five set piece routine and using every bit of her eight second conversion to seal a famous comeback that could have a huge bearing on their top four chances.

Results:

- HC Melbourne Women 4 (Cotter 18’ FG + C; Gravenall FG + C) def. Tassie Tigers Women 3 (Kershaw PC; Dobbie FG + C)
- HC Melbourne Men 5 (Ephraums 34’ FG; Roberts 38’ FG +C; Smits 45’ PC; Walker 54’ FG) def. Tassie Tigers Men 2 (Welch 25’ FG + C)

Aurora Energy Tasmanian Hockey Centre, Hobart

=== Round 2 ===
NSW Pride v Tassie Tigers

Macarthur Regional Hockey Complex, Narellan

Women: NSW Pride 8 def. Tassie Tigers 5 - Highlights

Abby Wilson became the league’s all-time leading scorer with a hat trick inside the opening three minutes. Jenna Rae McIntyre and Makayla Jones added to the tally with doubles, while Grace Young, Maddi Smith and Alana Kavanagh impressed in support. Tassie fought back through Philly Bridley’s hat-trick and Roos Swann’s converted field goal, while former Hockeyroos Jane Claxton and Renee Taylor added experience and guile to their aggressive playing style. But the Pride’s firepower ensured an 8–5 win and kept them unbeaten at the top of the women’s competition. Post-match Scott Barker (NSW Pride) was full of praise for the way his charges moved the ball with precision, but will be seeking to tidy up the defensive end ahead of sterner challenges.

Men: Tassie Tigers 6 def. NSW Pride 4 - Highlights

In one of the league’s greatest ever comebacks, Tassie stormed home with four unanswered goals in the final seven minutes to clinch an important victory. In crazy scenes, Tassie were forced to use 41 year old Tim Deavin as goalkeeper after Max Larkin’s injury. Shortly after, the Tigers trailed 4–2 when NSW’s Blake Govers failed to score a conversion. That sparked a surge: Ehren Hazell levelled at 4–4, before Jack Welch completed a career best five goal haul with a field goal conversion in the final minute as Tassie sealed a famous 6–4 victory — a result that pulled the Tigers level with their hosts in the congested mid table. It’ll be back to the drawing board for NSW Pride, with Govers’ hat-trick and Dylan Martin’s tomahawk set piece goal the only consolation for a result that slipped from their grasp, after the Tigers rode their luck and dialled up the pressure late, led by Lachlan Rogers and Hayden Beltz.

=== Round 3 ===
Tassie Tigers – Round Three Bye

The Tigers get an early season break heading into next week’s home game against the Adelaide Fire on Saturday, November 1. In a win for the men’s team last week, Tassie had four unanswered goals in the final seven minutes to clinch an the victory. After two narrow losses, the women’s team will have their eyes focused on securing their first win of the season.

=== Round 4 ===
Tassie Tigers vs Adelaide Fire

Aurora Energy Tasmanian Hockey Centre, Saturday

Women: Tassie Tigers 3 def. Adelaide Fire 2

In a fiery and physical contest, Adelaide struck early through Breana Catley, who scored and converted inside two minutes with a powerful run and finish. The Tigers, who had struggled to convert chances all season, responded with renewed urgency in the third quarter.

Roos Swann led the charge, scoring and converting to level the match, before first-year sensation Isabelle Kruimink smashed home the Tigers’ 12th penalty corner of the match with a moment that lifted the home crowd to its feet. Maddi Brooks, Jane Claxton, Renee Taylor, and goalkeeper Evie Dalton were immense in the final minutes, repelling wave after wave of Adelaide attacks.

Lucy Sharman’s broken hand in a goal-saving effort added a sombre note to the win, highlighting the physical toll and commitment on display. The Tigers now sit fifth, with belief surging through the squad. Adelaide, meanwhile, will rue missed chances and a second-half fade that cost them dearly.

Men: Tassie Tigers 3 def. Adelaide Fire 0

The Tassie Tigers men roared back into finals contention with a dominant 3–0 win over Adelaide Fire, powered by a blistering start from Ehren Hazell. The talented striker netted a hat-trick inside eight minutes. First, a tap-in from a sharp semi-circle entry, then a composed conversion, and a clinical penalty corner that left Adelaide stunned.

From there, the Tigers controlled the tempo, with veterans Eddie Ockenden and Matt Swann orchestrating play and keeping Adelaide on the back foot. Leon Hayward was heroic in goal for the Fire, making multiple reflex saves to prevent a blowout. The Tigers have now won two straight and look increasingly dangerous, with their blend of youth and experience clicking at the right time.

Adelaide, still searching for their first points, showed glimpses of fight but lacked the finishing touch and composure in key moments. With Perth visiting Hobart next week, the Tigers have a golden opportunity to consolidate their top-four status.

=== Round 5 ===
Tassie Tigers vs Perth Thundersticks

Aurora Energy Tasmanian Hockey Centre, Saturday

Women: Perth Thundersticks 6 def. Tassie Tigers 1 - Highlights

The Thundersticks looked every bit the defending champions as they delivered a clinical and composed performance to claim their first win of the season, shutting out the Tassie Tigers 6–1. Georgia Wilson opened the scoring and converted, before Madi Ratcliffe and Kaitlin Nobbs extended the lead. Courtney Schonell added a conversion, while goalkeeper Zoe Newman stood tall with multiple penalty corner saves. Tassie pushed hard, earning repeated corners, but only Stephanie Kershaw found the net in the final minute. Perth’s defence was disciplined, led by Caitlyn Templeman and Rachel Frusher, and coupled with sharp finishing, their confidence looked restored with a crucial victory that lifts them into fourth place. Tassie, meanwhile, remain sixth with finals hopes fading.

Men: Tassie Tigers 8 def. Perth Thundersticks 1 - Highlights

Despite a determined effort from the Thundersticks, Tasmania proved too strong across all four quarters, securing a commanding 8–1 victory in a physical and fast-paced encounter. Jack Welch led early pressure, before Ehren Hazell and Tim Deavin struck late in the first term to establish control. Hazell completed a hat-trick, Lachlan Rogers and Eddie Ockenden added goals, and Hayden Beltz sealed the rout. Perth’s lone highlight came from Tom Harvie’s penalty corner in the opening minutes, while captain Jake Harvie bravely battled through after a nasty facial injury. Christian Starkie made reflex saves, but Tassie’s relentless possession and circle entries proved decisive. The Tigers now sit third, strengthening their finals credentials, while Perth’s rebuild took a stutter by their inability to treasure possession as they enter the ‘bye’.

=== Round 6 ===
BRISBANE BLAZE vs TASSIE TIGERS

Queensland State Hockey Centre, Sunday

Women: Tassie Tigers 2 (2) def. Brisbane Blaze 2 (0) – Highlights

An entertaining clash ended level at 2–2 before the Tigers delivered a flawless shootout performance. Maddi Brooks played a starring role for Tassie, scoring in regulation and coolly converting again to force the match to shootouts. For the Blaze, Sav Fitzpatrick and Hannah Callum-Sanders each struck to keep Brisbane in the hunt early on, but Tassie’s precision in the shootout proved decisive as they claimed it 2–0.

Men: Tassie Tigers 3 (3) def. Brisbane Blaze 3 (2) – Highlights

A thrilling contest in Hobart saw the Tigers edge Brisbane in a shootout after a 3–3 draw in regulation time. Oscar Sproule starred for Tassie with two goals, while Eddie Ockenden added another in a strong home performance. Brisbane matched them punch for punch, with Corey Weyer bagging two goals and Lachy Sharp adding one of his own. With the match locked at full time, Tassie held their nerve to claim the shootout 3–2, adding a valuable bonus point.

== 2023 Season ==
=== Round 1 ===
Men: In the men’s match, both sides fielded a host of new faces as they looked to make positive start to their campaigns after missing last year’s finals. After a typically hectic opening, HC Melbourne struck with their first penalty corner of the match on the stroke of quarter time, Cooper Burns’ tracer bullet smashing into the backboard. The second quarter saw Tassie unsuccessful from three penalty corner attempts in quick succession, largely courtesy to the brave and fearless first defender running out of Frazer Gerrard. It proved a crucial point of the match as HC Melbourne captain Damon Steffens then repeated the script from the first quarter to convert a drag flick in the final seconds of the half to double the lead. The margin was extended to three in the 41st minute when Steffens stepped up again with another lethal drag flick from a well worked penalty corner routine. Staring down the barrel, Tassie threw everything at HC Melbourne in the last quarter and in the 55th minute they were awarded a penalty stroke. Jeremy Hayward beat Kookaburras teammate Johan Durst from the penalty spot. Then Jack Welch stepped up for the added conversion opportunity to cut the margin further but Durst kept him out. Tassie continued to surge forward with long searching balls into the attacking circle but a moment of Burns brilliance snuffed out any chance of a comeback as he produced a reverse tomahawk that Nathan Ephraums expertly glanced home. Tassie goalkeeper Max Larkin did well to save from Ephraums’ ensuing conversion attempt at a double goal but it would count for little as HC Melbourne secured a 4-1 victory.

“It was awesome to get the win. To come out here and start the campaign off on the right foot. Last year we were a bit slow starting so we are stoked to come away with a win,” said Player of the Match and HC Melbourne captain Damon Steffens.

HC Melbourne host Adelaide Fire in Round 2 on Friday night, while Tassie travel to the nation’s capital to take on the Canberra Chill on Sunday 15 October.

Match Details – Men’s Match

Tassie Tigers 1 (Hayward 55’)

HC Melbourne 4 (Burns 15’, Steffens 30+/41’, Ephraums 57’)

Friday 6 October 2023

Tasmanian Hockey Centre

Tassie Tigers Men’s team: 2.Tyler McDonald, 3.Alex Shaw, 6.Josh Brooks, 7.Josh Mardell, 9.Jeremy Edwards (c), 10.Ruben Hoey, 12.Sam McCulloch, 14.Jack Welch, 19.Tim Deavin, 20.Ehren Hazell, 25.Max Larkin (gk), 27.Gobindraj Gill, 28.Lachlan Rogers, 30.Alistair White, 32.Jeremy Hayward

HC Melbourne Men’s team: 1.Craig Marais, 2.Frazer Gerrard, 4.Liam Henderson, 5.Douglas Buckley, 6.Damon Steffens (c), 7.Nathan Ephraums, 8.Lachlan Steinfort, 9.Nathan Copey, 10.Brad Marais, 11.Cooper Burns, 11.Cooper Burns, 12.Connar Otterbach, 13.Jayshaan Randhawa, 15.Josh Simmonds, 18.Johan Durst (gk), 22.Ben White

Women: A 4th minute Joanne Peeters drag flick was enough for the Victorians to edge past the home side 1-0 in the women’s match, while the HC Melbourne Men prevailed 4-1. Incredibly, HC Melbourne Women had 13 penalty corners to nil in the game but Tassie Tigers goalkeeper Evie Dalton had a game for the ages, continually repelling wave after wave of attacks. The home side were not without their chances as their defensive resolve kept them in the contest. However, last year’s minor premiers were not going to be denied maximum points to open their season.

“We had a lot of opportunities up front and a lot of penalty corners so we’ll go back and work on that during the week,” said Player of the Match and HC captain Hannah Gravenall.

“It was a tough grind tonight. Credit to Tassie, they defended really well and their keeper was superb so it was good to get the win.”

“It was a good first hit out and great to be back out there.”

Match Details – Women’s Match

Tassie Tigers 0

HC Melbourne 1 (Peeters 4’)

Friday 6 October 2023

Tasmanian Hockey Centre

Tassie Tigers Women’s team: 2.Jemma Kenworthy, 3.Lucy Millington, 4.Maddison Brooks, 5.Taylor Brooks, 9.Emily Donovan, 11.Isabelle Sharman, 12.Louise Maddock, 13.Phillida Bridley (c), 15.Lucy Cooper, 16.Maddison Clark, 17.Kathryn Lane, 20.Beth Dobbie, 21.Lauren Canning, 25.Evie Dalton (gk), 28.Pipi Martos

HC Melbourne Women’s team: 1.Bridget Laurance (gk), 2.Aisling Utri, 3.Nicola Hammond, 5.Krissy Bates, 6.Josie Lawton, 7.Ciara Utri, 11.Joanne Peeters, 12.Emily Hamilton-Smith, 13.Megan Alakus, 14.Laura Barden, 15.Olivia Downes, 20.Zali Ward, 22.Charlotte Hodgson, 23.Samantha Snow, 25.Hannah Gravenall (c)

=== Round 2 ===
Men: The Tassie Tigers feasted on the Canberra Chill men’s side with a thumping 7-0 victory, as their new-look forward line gelled in spectacular fashion. After recording just one field goal in the 2022 season, the Tigers had two field goals and a conversion after just two and a half minutes of play. Jeremy Edwards had opened the scoring after just 39 seconds with an intended cross turned in but was unable to convert on his reverse stick side. There was time for Rupinder Pal Singh to see his penalty corner flick well saved by Tigers keeper Max Larkin, before Sam McCulloch found himself in the right spot after teammate Ehren Hazell’s shot was blocked to double the visitor’s advantage. McCulloch made it 3-0 with a no-nonsense tomahawk strike that sailed into the roof with his conversion chance. Momentum stayed with the Tigers after quarter time with Player of the Match Jack Welch nailing a penalty corner flick, before McCulloch created something out of seemingly nothing to deflect home from the baseline after 26 minutes. The former Development Squad member and Burras star claimed a four-goal haul when he calmly slotted the ensuing conversion chance under the encroaching keeper. Recovering from a 6-0 deficit was always going to be a mountain for the Canberra Chill but they continued to work tirelessly, led by Davis Atkin and Jay Macdonald. The Chill failed to take advantage of four consecutive penalty corner opportunities before the Tigers wrapped up their scoring with Hazell cleverly touching home on the goal line from Jeremy Edwards’ direct aerial, after the Chill had withdrawn keeper Brendan Hill.

“That was a very important win for us, not only the points, but the four field goals,” Tigers coach Stephen McMullen said.

“With the other results, it’s a tight ladder, so the season is back in our hands.”

“With time on and off the field, our forwards are connecting, and now working for each other, creating space and pressure.”

“The defence was exceptional, particularly in the latter stages when Canberra were throwing everything at us.”

Match Details – Men’s Match

Canberra Chill 0

Tassie Tigers 7 (Edwards 1’, McCulloch 3’/3’/26’/26’, Welch 21’, Hazell 56’)

Sunday 15 October 2023

National Hockey Centre, Canberra

Canberra Chill Men’s Team: 2.Ben Staines, 4.Jaume Torras, 6.Connor Tuddenham, 8.Sean Baker, 9.Jamie Hawke, 10.Owen Chivers, 11.Garry Backhus, 12.Jake Staines, 15.Hayden Dillon (c), 17.Aiden Dooley, 22.Jay Macdonald, 24.Davis Atkin, 26.James Jewel, 32.Brendan Hill (gk), 33.Rupinder Pal Singh

Tassie Tigers Men’s team: 3.Alex Shaw, 4.Hayden Beltz (c), 6.Josh Brooks, 7.Josh Mardell, 9.Jeremy Edwards, 12.Sam McCulloch, 14.Jack Welch, 19.Tim Deavin, 20.Ehren Hazell, 25.Max Larkin (gk), 27.Gobindraj Gill, 28.Lachlan Rogers, 30.Alistair White, 32.Jeremy Hayward

Women: In the women’s match, Irish international trio Kate Mullan, Sarah Hawkshaw and Roisin Upton had a day out in guiding a strong Chill team performance to a goal in every quarter to defeat the Tassie Tigers 4-0. After an early penalty corner sighter, the Chill opened the scoring with Naomi Evans’ reverse stick deflection from a perfectly executed pass from Upton after just five minutes. The Tigers squandered consecutive set piece opportunities at the other end, while skipper Sarah McCambridge had a chance blocked by Chill keeper Rene Hunter after 22 minutes. But Player of the Match brought the crowd to their feet with the Irish captain collecting the ball deep on the by-line, cutting inboard to deliver an unstoppable tomahawk strike high into the net. Tigers keeper Cami Vaughan commenced an impressive individual performance, denying Mullan’s conversion opportunity, but did need the support of Maddi Brooks on the goal line to keep the Tigers within touching distance at the half. The pair continued to trade set piece chances, before Mullan and teammate Catriona Bailey-Price both crashed reverse stick chances goalward without success. Late in the third term, Madeline Dooley capped off her Chill debut with a perfectly executed aerial pass to Evans, who earned a penalty stroke for New Zealand international Kaitlin Cotter to score in the 42nd minute. Vaughan returned with a brilliant stick save to deny Evans on the conversion attempt, but Mullan continued to inspire the Chill with forward thrusts. The Chill’s remarkable team game was capped when Lauren Yee squeezed a fore-stick shot for Irish number 11 Hawkshaw to touch home at the far post. While Vaughan would claim her third conversion win of the afternoon, and denied Commerford a late cherry on top, the Chill banked their first points for the JDH Hockey One League.

“It was excellent. The crowd was excellent. The atmosphere was excellent. I think the Chill put on a really good display and it was easy to get up for the game,” Mullan said post-game.

“We wanted to get last week’s game out of our system because we were disappointed, and I think today we showed what we can do. It’s very exciting and I’m very proud of the girls.”

“It has been a brilliant experience so far. There’s such a professional set up here and we eat, sleep and breathe hockey at the minute, which is what we’ve always dreamed of and to be here with two of my closest mates is fantastic.”

Match Details – Women’s Match

Canberra Chill 4 (Evans 5’, Mullan 24’, Cotter 42’, Hawkshaw 52’)

Tassie Tigers 0

Sunday 15 October 2023

National Hockey Centre, Canberra

Canberra Chill Women’s team: 2.Katie Mullan, 5.Claudia Johnston, 6.Roisin Upton, 7.Naomi Evans (c), 8.Sarah Hawkshaw, 11.Tamsin Bunt, 14.Emily Robson, 16.Georgie Smithers, 17.Kaitlin Cotter, 21.Mikaela Patterson, 23.Kalindi Commerford, 25.Lauren Yee, 28.Catriona Bailey-Price, 29.Madeline Dooley, 32.Rene Hunter (gk)

Tassie Tigers Women’s team: 1.Sarah McCambridge (c), 2.Jemma Kenworthy, 3.Lucy Millington, 4.Maddison Brooks, 5.Taylor Brooks, 7.Jade Smith, 9.Emily Donovan, 11.Isabelle Sharman, 12.Louise Maddock, 13.Phillida Bridley, 15.Lucy Cooper, 16.Maddison Clark, 17.Kathryn Lane, 21.Lauren Canning, 23.Camila Vaughan (gk)

=== Round 3 ===
Men: In the men’s match, two penalty strokes from Kookaburra Jeremy Hayward were enough to see the Tassie Tigers scrape past the Perth Thundersticks and take top spot on the ladder. The home side’s win was also largely due to the heroics of young Burras goalkeeper Max Larkin, who reeled off a multitude of impressive saves to keep the Thundersticks out. Larkin was called into action when Liam Flynn whipped a cracking shot goal bound late in the first quarter, the Tassie keeper pulling off a fine save. The opening goal came in the 12th minute after the Tigers were awarded a penalty stroke for an infringement from a penalty corner. Hayward stepped up to clinically send his stroke past Ben Rennie in the Thundersticks goal. The lead was doubled in the 25th minute when it was almost a case of déjà vu as the umpire again signalled a penalty stroke after another Tassie penalty corner. Again, Hayward made no mistake converting. Stung finding themselves two goals down, the Thundersticks reduced the deficit just before half time when Kookaburra Tom Wickham finished with aplomb in a crowded attacking circle, knocking the ball in between his legs with his back to goal. The Thundersticks peppered away at the Tassie goal in the third quarter with a string of penalty corners, however the home side’s defence refused to buckle. Larkin was playing like a man possessed as he continued to repel penalty corner after penalty corner, the Thundersticks managing to convert just once from ten set pieces. The visitors continued to apply the blowtorch but could not find a way through as the Tigers, without experienced duo Eddie Ockenden and Josh Beltz, secured a memorable victory.

“That was an onslaught. They came at us from the first whistle. We played into their hands and kept passing the ball to them, but luckily we had Max, he was fantastic tonight,” said Hayward.

The Tassie Tigers next head north to take on Brisbane Blaze on Friday night, while the Perth Thundersticks are at home to HC Melbourne on Sunday 29 October.

Match Details – Men’s Match

Tassie Tigers 2 (Hayward 12’/25’)

Perth Thundersticks 1 (Wickham 30’)

Friday 20 October 2023

Tasmanian Hockey Centre

Tassie Tigers Men’s team: 3.Alex Shaw, 4.Hayden Beltz (c), 6.Josh Brooks, 7.Josh Mardell, 8.Joseph Murphy, 9.Jeremy Edwards, 12.Sam McCulloch, 14.Jack Welch, 19.Tim Deavin, 20.Ehren Hazell, 25.Max Larkin (gk), 27.Gobindraj Gill, 28.Lachlan Rogers, 30.Alistair White, 32.Jeremy Hayward

Perth Thundersticks Men’s team: 1.Matthew Bird, 2.Will Battistessa, 3.Tim Geers, 4.Jake Harvie, 5.Tom Wickham, 11.Tom Harvie, 12.Alistair Murray, 13.Brayden King, 14.Matthew Willis, 15.Liam Flynn, 16.Brodee Foster, 17.Aran Zalewski (c), 18.Ben Rennie (gk), 23.Cambell Geddes, 26.James Collins

Women: An early Thundersticks goal rush in the women’s game, followed by a defensive Tassie Tigers men’s masterclass saw results split to open Round 3 of the JDH Hockey One League at the Tasmanian Hockey Centre. The Thundersticks Women made it two wins from two to start their season as they recorded a 4-1 victory, before the Tassie Tigers Men fought off a Thundersticks second half barrage to prevail 2-1. The women’s match started with a flurry as the Thundersticks went three goals up inside ten minutes. Britney DeSilva scored her first Hockey One League goal before expertly converting the resultant conversion opportunity, before a firmly hit Georgina Dowd strike from a penalty corner had the visitors flying. Tassie hit back almost immediately when Lucy Millington converted with a well directed drag flick in the 11th minute in a frenetic opening quarter. The home side was beginning to arrest the momentum and they earned three penalty corners but were unable to make them count. With the result far from over despite Perth’s two goal advantage, the visitors ensured all points would be heading west when Liné Malan managed the deftest of touches from a penalty corner in the 53rd minute.

“We started really well which was one of our objectives of the game…to start fast and hard,” said Squibb.

“We then let them get on top but we clawed out way back nicely to get that late goal at the end.”

Match Details – Women’s Match

Tassie Tigers 1 (Millington 11’)

Perth Thundersticks 4 (DeSilva 6’/6’, Dowd 9’, Malan 53’)

Friday 20 October 2023

Tasmanian Hockey Centre

Tassie Tigers Women’s team: 1.Sarah McCambridge (c), 3.Lucy Millington, 4.Maddison Brooks, 5.Taylor Brooks, 7.Jade Smith, 9.Emily Donovan, 12.Louise Maddock, 13.Phillida Bridley, 15.Lucy Cooper, 16.Maddison Clark, 17.Kathryn Lane, 20.Beth Dobbie, 21.Lauren Canning, 25.Evelyn Dalton (gk), 29.Belen D’Esposito

Perth Thundersticks Women’s team: 1.Pippa Morgan, 3.Neasa Flynn, 6.Sarah Byrnes, 7.Penny Squibb, 8.Georgia Wilson, 9.Shanea Tonkin, 10.Jesse Reid, 11.Rachel Frusher (c), 12.Liné Malan, 14.Elizabeth Duguid (gk), 15.Belle Ramshaw, 17.Annie Gibbs, 18.Renee Rockliff, 19.Georgina Dowd, 24.Britney DeSilva

=== Round 4 ===
Men: With Matt Wells joining the Burras for the Sultan of Johor Cup, Troy Elder took charge of the Brisbane Blaze Men against a Tassie team high on confidence after a character filled win over the Perth Thundersticks. The home side had the better of the opening quarter, a venomous shot from Boyde that was headed for the top corner superbly saved by Henry Chambers in the Tassie net. Despite the intent of both teams and frantic nature of the contest, nothing split the teams after the first 30 minutes. The deadlock was finally broken in the 35th minute when Anderson put the ball on a plate for Boyde to finish well, the Black Sticks midfielder ramming home the conversion to make it 2-0. Anderson then went inches away from extending the advantage when his shot on the reverse thundered into the post. The Blaze had a third when Randle let fly from just inside the circle, the presence of Cale Cramer near Chambers enough to distract the keeper and see the ball hit the backboard. Both sides’ cause was not helped with ill discipline that saw nine cards handed out, including three yellow cards for the Blaze. Tassie’s first penalty corner came three minutes into the final quarter but aggressive first defender running from the Blaze blocked successive Jeremy Hayward drag flicks. Anderson put the exclamation mark on a superb individual and team performance with a scintillating finish in the 58th minute as he beat two defenders and followed it up with a clinical conversion to give him eight goals in three games this season.

“It was a tight game, there were plenty of cards and it was very physical…Tassie are a really good side,” said Blaze defender Tim Howard.

“Credit to the boys. We needed everyone today. Playing parts of the game with nine players is tough. We just needed to stick to our structure and work hard to not let them score.”

Match Details – Men’s Match

Brisbane Blaze 5 (Boyde 35’/35’, Randle 43’, Anderson 58’/58’)

Tassie Tigers 0

Friday 27 October 2023

Queensland State Hockey Centre

Brisbane Blaze Men’s team: 2.Shane Kenny, 3.Corey Weyer, 5.Lucas Brown, 7.Liam Hart, 9.Jacob Anderson, 10.Cale Cramer, 11.Michael Francis, 12.Jake Whetton (c), 13.David Hubbard, 16.Tim Howard, 17.Scott Boyde, 19.Luke Randle, 21.Max Harding, 23.Daniel Beale, 32.Mitchell Nicholson (gk)

Tassie Tigers Men’s team: 3.Alex Shaw, 4.Hayden Beltz (c), 5.Ewan Vickery, 6.Josh Brooks, 7.Josh Mardell, 8.Joseph Murphy, 9.Jeremy Edwards, 12.Sam McCulloch, 14.Jack Welch, 19.Tim Deavin, 20.Ehren Hazell, 23.Henry Chambers (gk), 27.Gobindraj Gill, 30.Alistair White, 32.Jeremy Hayward

Women: In the women’s match, the visitors led 3-2 with 25 minutes remaining but from there it was one way traffic as the Blaze scored the last seven goals to run out emphatic 9-3 winners, Hockeyroo Rosie Malone with a hat-trick. Hoping to repeat their stunning upset over the Blaze from last season, the Tassie Tigers Women started with intent, winning a penalty corner inside the opening two minutes. While they could not convert from the set piece, the Tigers took a 5th minute lead when Phillida Bridley produced a magnificent finish, her quick-fire tomahawk leaving Blaze goalkeeper Jordan Bliss glued to the spot. Bliss saved Bridley’s resultant conversion attempt to keep the margin at one, before Brisbane captain Morgan Gallagher blazed high and wide at the other end in the home side’s first real sight on goal. Bliss was forced to palm a goal bound shot away before being called upon moments later to palm away another sharp effort. The Blaze drew level in the 22nd minute when Gallagher blocked an attempted defensive clearance before following up and clinically putting her shot past Evelyn Dalton. However, she could not repeat the dose from the conversion opportunity to leave scores locked at 1-1. Three minutes later the Blaze hit the front when Savannah Fitzpatrick sent a shot through the legs of Dalton, but again the Tassie keeper managed to deny the added conversion to leave it 2-1 at half time. Having regrouped during the break, Tassie put their noses back in front. Taylor Brooks fired the ball into the circle with intent and Jade Smith positioned herself perfectly between Jodie Kenny and Tatum Stewart to deflect it past Bliss and score against her former side. A successful Smith conversion suddenly had the Tasmanians leading 3-2. That stung the Blaze into action and three Malone goals in the space of two minutes turned the game on its head. Kenny extended the lead further courtesy of a penalty stroke and when Kendra Fitzpatrick skimmed along the goal line and picked out Ruby Harris to knock the ball in from close range followed by a successful conversion, the score had suddenly blown out to 8-3 as the home side finished full of running. Gallagher mopped up a blocked Kenny swat from a penalty corner to round off a remarkable score line considering the Tigers twice led in the match.

“Tassie did really well in the first half to keep the pressure on and we said at the start of the game that they are a team that never gives up,” said Malone who was named Player of the Match.

“For us it is a matter of sticking to what we are good at and finding those quick passes and connections which definitely worked in the second half.”

“Hopefully we will build from this and not go backwards, which is what we did last year. I think we have come out and shown we are a team that is really building into this competition and when we work well, we really work well together.”

“With everything I have done, some of my best memories are my junior years playing for Queensland and I think that’s why Hockey One is so special because you get to play with the girls I did as a 12 year old.

Match Details – Women’s Match

Brisbane Blaze 9 (Gallagher 22’/59’, S.Fitzpatrick 25’, Malone 39’/39’/41’, Kenny 50’, Harris 57’/57’)

Tassie Tigers 3 (Bridley 5’, Smith 33’/34’)

Friday 27 October 2023

Queensland State Hockey Centre

Brisbane Blaze Women’s team: 1.Savannah Fitzpatrick, 2.Rosie Malone, 3.Kendra Fitzpatrick, 4.Claire Colwill, 5.Morgan Gallagher (c), 7.Jodie Kenny, 8.Dayle Dolkens, 9.Casey Dolkens, 11.Morgan Mathison, 12.Tatum Stewart, 13.Rebecca Greiner, 22.Britt Wilkinson, 23.Ruby Harris, 25.Kyra Livermore, 88.Jordan Bliss (gk)

Tassie Tigers Women’s team: 1.Sarah McCambridge (c), 3.Lucy Millington, 4.Maddison Brooks, 5.Taylor Brooks, 7.Jade Smith, 11.Isabelle Sharman, 12.Louise Maddock, 13.Phillida Bridley, 15.Lucy Cooper, 17.Kathryn Lane, 20.Beth Dobbie, 21.Lauren Canning, 25.Evelyn Dalton (gk), 28.Pipi Martos, 29.Belen D’Esposito

=== Round 5 ===
Men: A sudden death shootout save from star keeper Ash Thomas assisted NSW Pride Men to a 5-4 victory on penalties against a determined Tassie Tigers outfit at the Sydney Olympic Hockey Centre. After an initial Pride onslaught, an inspired debut from teenage Tigers goalie Magnus McCausland and vintage Tim Deavin, Jeremy Hayward and Jeremy Edwards defensive performances had kept the Tigers within touching distance throughout the match. Kookaburra Tom Craig blazed wildly over the crossbar early on for NSW Pride, before the sides traded two penalty corner opportunities each in the opening twenty minutes. Momentum swung the way of the hosts when the Tigers conceded a third set piece and had their runner sent to the half-way line, paving the way for Player of the Match Ky Willott to thread a sizzling drag flick to make it 1-0. Former Pride forward Ehren Hazell had repeat penalty corner opportunities from the top but was unable to threaten the home side’s goal early in the third quarter. With time ticking away, McCausland made a crucial clearing save that propelled the Tigers forward for one final foray, with the clever thinking Hazell earning a late penalty corner. At the third time of asking beyond the final siren, Gobind Gill’s goal bound strike was paddled home at the far post by Tigers skipper Hayden Beltz to take the match to a shootout. The penalty shootout began with an exhibition in composed finishing, with Sam McCulloch and Jack Welch’s (Tigers) conversions cancelled out by goals from Willott and Flynn Ogilvie (Pride). Tigers defender Hayward was denied by a double save from Thomas to give the hosts the advantage, which was consolidated when Jack Hayes (Pride) and Beltz (Tigers) duly scored next. McCausland got the Tigers back on level terms when he channelled Craig wide and forced a tame effort across the face, before Jeremy Edwards (Tigers) and Daine Richards (Pride) converted to send the shootout to sudden death. After Willott expertly found the bottom corner, it fell to Thomas to save from Welch and ensure the NSW Pride claimed the bonus point.

“We know Tassie are a really tough team to beat and the stats actually show that they’re probably the hardest team to break down and they concede the least amount of penalty corners, and that certainly showed,” Pride’s Tom Craig said post-match.

“They have great experienced defenders and you’ve got to get the points somehow and we won it a different way and while three points isn’t as good as five, we know we still have lots to work on but it’s still a good result for us.”

Match Details – Men’s Match

NSW Pride 1 (Willott 24’)

Tassie Tigers 1 (Beltz 60+’)

NSW Pride won shootout 5-4

Saturday 4 November 2023

Sydney Olympic Park Hockey Centre

NSW Pride Men’s team: 2.Tom Craig, 5.Ash Thomas (gk), 7.Daine Richards, 8.Nathanael Stewart, 14.Dylan Martin, 15.Miles Davis, 16.Josh Gregory, 19.Jack Hayes, 20.Ky Willott, 22.Flynn Ogilvie, 23.Ryan Woolnough, 28.Sam Gray, 29.Tim Brand, 32.Callum Mackay, 34.Thomas Miotto

Tassie Tigers Men’s team: 1.Magnus McCausland (gk), 4.Hayden Beltz (c), 5.Ewan Vickery, 6.Josh Brooks, 7.Josh Mardell, 8.Joseph Murphy, 9.Jeremy Edwards, 12.Sam McCulloch, 14.Jack Welch, 16.Alex Hogan-Jones, 19.Tim Deavin, 20.Ehren Hazell, 27.Gobindraj Gill, 30.Alistair White, 32.Jeremy Hayward

Women: A four-goal haul from Player of the Match Laura Reid has guided NSW Pride to a comfortable 8-1 defeat of the Tassie Tigers in a clinical performance that will have made their JDH Hockey One League rivals sit up and take notice. It took just six minutes for Reid to assert herself on the match, touching home an assist from Abby Wilson on her reverse before converting from the finest on angles to establish a 2-0 advantage. When Grace Young was tripped as she powerfully drove into the attacking circle, it presented an opportunity for Kaitlin Nobbs to stretch the Pride’s lead to three and the Hockeyroos star finished expertly. Tigers keeper Evie Dalton recovered quickly to deny Young’s conversion opportunity to stem the bleeding until the final seconds of the first half. A free-flowing move from their defensive end was completed by Reid and after helping herself to a sublime conversion finish, the former Canberra Chill forward moved three goals clear on top of the scoring charts. Shortly after the interval, Alice Arnott eliminated three before slicing her goal shot wide and then touched a brilliant Wilson reverse stick pass across the face in consecutive let offs for the visitors. When Maddi Brooks’ incisive pass helped Lucy Millington draw Hockeyroos keeper Jocelyn Bartram into a smart save, it looked like the young Tigers may be started to get a foothold in the match. But their momentum was squashed as Nobbs fed ‘Pride Ambassador’ Greta Hayes at the far post to deflect home for NSW Pride, and the latter’s spin conversion move almost felt part of the Pride in Pride Round manuscript. Tiger recruit Jade Smith continued to battle bravely, often in isolation, and was rewarded with the earning of a penalty stroke after forty-three minutes and Maddi Brooks stepped up to deny the Pride a clean sheet. But there was still time for Young to complete the scoring with an overhead smash more frequently featured at Wimbledon, after a penalty corner strike was lifted into her vicinity.

“Coming off the back of last week’s game, obviously it wasn’t our best performance, so we just wanted to go out there tonight and just get back to our principles; our pressing, play some good, solid hockey, pass the ball around and I felt like we did just that,” Hayes said post-match.

“The crowd came out loud and proud…so I’m really happy with the ‘Pride in Pride’ round initiative and I thought the girls all got around it, the guys as well, Tassie were super keen to be involved as well. I think it’s a really important weekend to have.”

Match Details – Women’s Match

NSW Pride 8 (Reid 7’/7’/30’/30’, Nobbs 12’, Hayes 41’/41’, Young 49’)

Tassie Tigers 1 (M.Brooks 43’)

Saturday 4 November 2023

Sydney Olympic Park Hockey Centre

NSW Pride Women’s team: 1.Alice Arnott, 3.Jocelyn Bartram (gk), 7.Laura Reid, 8.Greta Hayes, 11.Estelle Hughes, 13.Sarah Johnston, 14.Makayla Jones, 16.Alana Kavanagh, 20.Kaitlin Nobbs, 24.Maddison Smith, 26.Grace Stewart, 27.Kendelle Tait, 30.Mariah Williams (c), 31.Abby Wilson, 32.Grace Young

Tassie Tigers Women’s team: 1.Sarah McCambridge (c), 3.Lucy Millington, 4.Maddison Brooks, 5.Taylor Brooks, 7.Jade Smith, 8.Emily Donovan, 12.Louise Maddock, 13.Phillida Bridley, 15.Lucy Cooper, 16.Madison Clark, 17.Kathryn Lane, 20.Beth Dobbie, 21.Lauren Canning, 25.Evelyn Dalton (gk), 29.Belen D’Esposito

=== Round 6 ===
Men: Adelaide Fire Men have kept themselves in finals contention with a stellar 3-1 win over the Tassie Tigers, before the Fire Women ensured they would finish the JDH Hockey One League 2023 Season above their Tasmanian counterparts thanks to a come from behind 2-1 victory in Hobart tonight. The men’s result was Adelaide Fire’s second win of the season and catapulted them into the top four. Meanwhile for Tassie, who have the bye in the final round, they must wait on other results to see if they will feature in the Finals Main Event on 25/26 November in Canberra. In a pivotal match for both men’s teams, the hosts had a dream start when Jeremy Hayward struck in the 7th minute with a drag flick that had too much on it for Adelaide Fire goalkeeper Jed Snowden. The goal was reward for effort for Tassie who dominated early on, although they could not add to their lead with three further penalty corners in the opening quarter. The second quarter belonged to the Adelaide Fire and they produced an emphatic response when Hugh Snowden scored with aplomb from a tight angle, sending his tomahawk through the legs of Burras goalkeeper Max Larkin. When Snowden was brought down by Larkin during the resultant conversion opportunity, the umpire awarded a penalty stroke which Fraser Heigh cooly put away to put the visitors in front. The Tigers had another three penalty corner opportunities in the third quarter with Kookaburra Jack Welch in the thick of the action, however they could not make them count on the scoreboard. Jed Snowden was in the zone, pulling off a fine reflex save to keep out a Jeremy Hayward missile as the Fire was holding on by a thread. Just when it seemed the Tigers were on the verge of an equaliser, a telling point of the match came in the 41st minute when Hugh Snowden was sandwiched my Larkin and Hayward as he received a long aerial ball, the umpire signalling for a penalty stroke. Heigh stepped up to again beat Larkin from the spot to make it 3-1 to the Fire, Larkin then denying Snowden the conversion to keep the margin at two. Jed Snowden denied Hayden Beltz a rare goal as Tassie went for the jugular in the last quarter. However, the Fire almost stung them again when Peter Scott went on a darting run into the circle, firing a shot on the reverse that was saved by Larkin before Heigh’s effort on the rebound was blocked. Larkin was removed with two minutes to go and Tim Deavin blazed a desperate effort over the target. But as much as Tassie tried, some masterful last ditch defending from the Fire saw the South Australians record their second win of the season and leave the finals race full of intrigue.

“It’s pretty incredible…it has been a tough couple of seasons but we have brought in some guys from around the country which has been challenging…but the coaching staff have really pushed us along so it has been good,” said Adelaide Fire captain Fred Gray.

“We’ve got some exciting strikers who like to run and we just want to feed them as much as we can.”

For Player of the Match Jed Snowden, the result was just as satisfying.

“It was getting pretty stressful (at the end) but I had faith in all the boys to do their part and do my part as well, so I was very happy how it turned out,” said Snowden.

“I’m pretty happy with how I’m going at the moment. I don’t want to look too far ahead, just keep it simple and finish the year off strong.”

Match Details – Men’s Match

Tassie Tigers 1 (Hayward 7’)

Adelaide Fire 3 (H.Snowden 22’, Heigh 23’/41’)

Saturday 11 November 2023

Tasmanian Hockey Centre

Tassie Tigers Men’s team: 4.Hayden Beltz, 5.Ewan Vickery, 6.Josh Brooks, 7.Josh Mardell, 9.Jeremy Edwards, 12.Sam McCulloch, 13.Josh Beltz (c), 14.Jack Welch, 19.Tim Deavin, 20.Ehren Hazell, 25.Max Larkin (gk), 27.Gobindraj Gill, 28.Lachlan Rogers, 30.Alistair White, 32.Jeremy Hayward

Adelaide Fire Men’s team: 1.Kieran Govers, 2.Connor Richmond-Spouse, 3.Lucas Toonen, 4.Jack Holland, 6.Matthew Magann, 7.Peter Scott, 9.Fred Gray (c), 10.Lachlan Arneil, 11.Kyton Rayner, 12.Mitchell Dell, 13.Alastair Oliver, 14.Fraser Heigh, 16.Hugh Snowden, 17.Charl Ulrich, 21.Jed Snowden (gk)

Women: The women’s match featured two largely youthful teams searching for their first win of the season and looking to avoid the wooden spoon. Jillaroos squad member Lucy Sharman flashed a drag flick just wide in the 2nd minute for the Adelaide Fire in an early warning shot in a first half that proved a seesawing contest. Something had to give and it eventually did in the 28th minute when a Lucy Millington drag flick saw the ball come off Fire goalkeeper Amy Hammond onto the post and across the goal line to give the hosts the lead at half time. However, the advantage only lasted for five minutes into the third quarter as Adelaide Fire scored an classy team goal. Chloe Carter split the Tassie defence with a pass down the channel to Brooke Peris in a dangerous position and the Hockeyroo laid it on a platter for Miki Spano who could not miss. Spano was prevented the ensuing conversion by Tigers goalkeeper Camila Vaughan to leave it all square and set up an entertaining finish. A stunning stick save from Vaughan kept out a Linzi Appleyard drag flick, before Peris created something out of nothing to narrowly miss putting the visitors in front. Adelaide went close again five minutes into the last quarter, then from the resultant penalty corner they did hit the front. Hattie Shand hammered a bobbling ball from just inside the circle that Vaughan could not fully deal with and Anna Crowley was positioned perfectly to knock home her first goal of the season. Millington sent a drag flick just wide in Tassie’s best late chance but it was the Adelaide Fire who would take the points home.

“It was a really competitive match. We’ve been fighting all season for a win and have been putting in some good performances, so it’s great to finally break through tonight,” said Shand, who was named Player of the Match.

“I had a quieter first few games but I love being more attacking up the sidelines and putting in those penetrating passes to the girls…so it was good fun out there.”

Match Details – Women’s Match

Tassie Tigers 1 (Millington 28’)

Adelaide Fire 2 (Spano 35’, Crowley 50’)

Saturday 11 November 2023

Tasmanian Hockey Centre

Tassie Tigers Women’s team: 1.Sarah McCambridge (c), 2.Jemma Kenworthy, 3.Lucy Millington, 4.Maddison Brooks, 5.Taylor Brooks, 7.Jade Smith, 9.Emily Donovan, 13.Phillida Bridley, 15.Lucy Cooper, 16.Madison Clark, 17.Kathryn Lane, 20.Beth Dobbie, 21.Lauren Canning, 23.Camila Vaughan (gk), 29.Belen D’Esposito

Adelaide Fire Women’s team: 1.Chloe Carter, 2.Brittany Wang, 4.Chloe Holland, 5.Holly Evans-Gill, 6.Euleena Maclachlan (c), 8.Miki Spano, 11.Lucy Sharman, 13.Hattie Shand, 15.Brooke Peris, 17.Katie Sharkey, 18.Anna Crowley, 21.Amy Hammond (gk), 25.Jane Claxton, 26.Linzi Appleyard, 27.Gabriella Mitreska

=== Round 7 ===
Tassie Tigers – BYE

== 2022 Season ==
=== Round 1 ===
Men’s Match

Braces to Joel Rintala and Cale Cramer have helped the Brisbane Blaze complete a smash and grab job away to the Tassie Tigers in front of a parochial club record crowd in Round 1 of the Sultana Bran Hockey One League. The on-field action was matched only by the incredible Hobart off-field atmosphere, with official figures recording 2,080 patrons in attendance as two perennial title contenders went toe to toe. The match itself saw the visitors burst out of the blocks with Rintala smashing home an unstoppable penalty corner flick in the third minute.

Tassie appeared stunned by the aerial prowess of Hugh Pembroke, Tim Howard and Corey Weyer in the first period and their indecision was punished when Cramer scored and duly converted his follow up attempt. The home crowd lifted their troops but after Kieron Arthur had a set piece flick saved by Blaze goalkeeper Mitch Nicholson, Rintala drove the knife in with his second goal from the top of the circle. Tassie continued to play aggressively and legend Eddie Ockenden rose them off the canvas with a neat finish, but even his brilliance couldn’t bring the deficit back to two goals. The final term was largely played on Tassie’s terms, but despite winning the penalty corner count 7-4, there would be no further way past the Blaze’s gutsy defensive group.

“This was massive for us. I thought it was a really good performance from the guy’s tonight and obviously it was a wonderful night for hockey with a lot of people out here watching,” said Player of the Match, Hugh Pembroke.

“We had a couple of debutants tonight too so I’m really happy with how we went about it and it’s a really good result for us going forward.”

Pembroke was also quick to turn his attention to their first home match against the Canberra Chill on Thursday.

“They’re a very good side with a couple of internationals, a couple of Japanese guys as well coming to play for them this year and they’re always a very tough challenge.”

“But now we’re excited to get back home and have a game in Brisbane.”

“It has been a couple of years since we’ve played in front of the Brisbane crowd and we can’t wait to get up there on Thursday and put in another good performance.”

The Tigers expect to regain star forward and set piece specialist Sam McCulloch for their first away match against the Adelaide Fire on Saturday night.

Match Details

Tassie Tigers 1 (Ockenden 35’)

Brisbane Blaze 4 (Rintala 3’/30’, Cramer 14’/14’)

Friday 30 September 2022

Tasmanian Hockey Centre

Tassie Tigers Men’s team: 4.Hayden Beltz, 5.Benjamin Austin, 6.Joshua Brooks, 7.Joshua Mardell, 8.Joseph Murphy, 9.Jeremy Edwards, 11.Eddie Ockenden, 13.Joshua Beltz (c), 15.Kieron Arthur, 19.Tim Deavin, 20.James Bourke, 23.Henry Chambers (gk), 26.Oliver Smith, 27.Gobindraj Gill

Unused substitute: 25.Max Larkin (gk)

Brisbane Blaze Men’s team: 2.Shane Kenny, 3.Corey Weyer, 4.Hugh Pembroke, 5.Lucas Brown, 7.Joel Rintala, 9.Jacob Anderson, 10.Jayden Atkinson, 11.Michael Francis, 13.Ethan White, 14.Isaac Layton, 15.Cale Cramer, 16.Tim Howard (c), 17.Scott Boyde, 27.Jared Taylor, 32.Mitchell Nicholson (gk)

Women’s Match

The Tassie Tigers have made a massive statement, opening their Sultana Bran Hockey One League women’s campaign by upstaging defending champions Brisbane Blaze with a captivating 3-1 penalty shootout victory. After scores were locked 2-2 at the end of regular time, Tigers goalkeeper Evie Dalton denied three Blaze shootouts in succession from Rosie Malone, Savannah Fitzpatrick and Britt Wilkinson. The visitors initially led in the shootout as Hannah Cullum-Sanders converted and goalkeeper Emily Witheyman-Crump denied Tigers rising star Maddi Brooks. But it was all Tassie from then on, with Maddy Murphy and USA internationals Cassie Sumfest and Brooke DeBerdine scoring to complete an impressive first up victory.

Tigers captain Murphy was beside herself with excitement and pride after seeing DeBerdine score the final shootout and joining her teammates in a celebration befitting the occasion.

“This is phenomenal. I’m so proud of all the girls tonight because we stuck to the game plan, played so hard for the whole game and I’m overwhelmed at how incredible this win is,” said Murphy.

“A shoutout to (Tigers goalkeeper) Evie Dalton who was incredible out there. They had nothing on her and the home crowd advantage tonight definitely helped so thank you to everyone who came out and supported us.”

It became apparent early in the contest that the young Tigers, blooding nine debutants, were up for the contest with Murphy and Sumfest registering first quarter shots before both sides traded penalty corner opportunities. The Blaze came within an inch of opening the scoring goal before half-time, but Rebecca Greiner and Malone couldn’t finish a promising move. The contest shifted in tempo when Tigers veteran Emily Donovan earned a penalty stroke, firing past Witheyman-Crump and into a Blaze foot on the goal-line. Maddi Brooks stepped up, just days after turning eighteen years of age to duly score, before thumping home a conversion on her reverse stick side. The Blaze lifted the tempo in search of a way back into the match and were rewarded when Fitzpatrick deflected home, only for Dalton to negate her conversion attempt. A mesmerising piece of individual skill from Cullum-Sanders created an equaliser for Malone, but her conversion could only skim the outside of the post to send the match to a shootout. The Tigers’ clinical routines, coupled with Dalton’s brilliance, saw them earn a bonus point and into second on the Sultana Bran Hockey One League ladder. Brisbane Blaze will return home with two points and face the Canberra Chill on Thursday, while the Tigers head to Adelaide to face the Fire on Saturday night.

Match Details

Tassie Tigers 2 (M.Brooks 37’/37’)

Brisbane Blaze 2 (Fitzpatrick 48’, Malone 55’)

Tassie Tigers win shootout 3-1

Friday 30 September 2022

Tasmanian Hockey Centre

Tassie Tigers Women’s team: 1.Sarah McCambridge, 2.Jillian Wolgemuth, 3.Hannah Richardson, 4.Maddi Brooks, 5.Taylor Brooks, 6.Raeleigh Phillips, 7.Maddy Murphy (c), 8.Cassie Sumfest, 9.Emily Donovan, 11.Eliza Westland, 12.Lou Maddock, 14.Brooke DeBerdine, 20.Beth Dobbie, 21.Lauren Canning, 25.Evie Dalton (gk)

Brisbane Blaze Women’s team: 1.Savannah Fitzpatrick, 2.Ambrosia Malone, 3.Casey Dolkens, 4.Ashley Fey, 6.Morgan Gallagher (c), 7.Hannah Cullum-Sanders, 8.Jade Smith, 12.Tatum Stewart, 13.Rebecca Greiner, 19.Morgan Mathison, 22.Britt Wilkinson, 23.Ruby Harris, 24.Claire Colwill, 30.Georgina West, 32.Emily Witheyman-Crump (gk)

=== Round 2 ===
Men’s Match

It was a case of no Jeremy Hayward, no worries for the Tassie Tigers men as they converted five penalty corners to defeat a brave Adelaide Fire in their own backyard in Round 2 of the Sultana Bran Hockey One League. With Kookaburras set piece specialist Hayward absent, the Tigers clearly demonstrated the depth of world class flicking options at the disposal, while captain Josh Beltz produced an eye-catching performance in defensive midfield. The Tigers suffocated the Fire defensive group throughout the match, earning thirteen penalty corner opportunities, whilst at the other end Tigers goalkeeper Henry Chambers was only called upon to make one save. Australian Burras representative Josh Brooks had a coming-of-age performance with two goals, whilst also earning four set piece opportunities for the winners to push his case for higher honours. Returnee Sam McCulloch and Kieron Arthur also converted flicks, with the latter striking the woodwork late on, while Kookaburras superstar Eddie Ockenden deflected home a set piece routine on three-quarter time. The Fire were well served by defensive penalty corner runner Alistair Oliver, who ran down several opportunities, Tom Cleghorn and goalkeeper Christian Starkie.

Player of the Match Josh Beltz was stoked to see his side clean up their attacking play, with a number of players contributing on a higher return from their circle entries.

“Yeah, last week against Brisbane we had a fair few (penalty corners) and couldn’t convert, so it was good to turn that around and score some corners tonight. Our flickers are finding form which is nice,” Beltz said post-game.

“Field goals are good as well though, so we need to focus on that for next game,” Beltz added.

The Tigers will return home sitting in fourth position and will host the Canberra Chill after the bye, on Thursday October 20. Beltz indicated Canberra have several personnel that mean they will be a difficult proposition, after pushing the Brisbane Blaze in Queensland last Thursday night.

“James Day at the back has a really good overhead. He’s got a really good connection with Ben and Jake Staines.”

“I think they’re a really dangerous team but if we play like we did tonight, we’re every chance of winning.”

The Adelaide Fire will go in search of their first points for the season when they host NSW Pride on Thursday night from 6pm local time.

Match Details

Adelaide Fire 0

Tassie Tigers 5 (Brooks 17’/35’, McCulloch 24’, Arthur 38’, Ockenden 45+’)

Saturday 8 October 2022

MATE Stadium

Umpires: Jayden Pearson & Zeke Newman

Adelaide Fire Men’s team: 1.Tom Cleghorn, 2.Connor Richmond-Spouse, 5.Jack Holland, 6.Angus Fry, 7.Geoff Abbott, 8.Brodie Gleeson, 9.Fred Gray, 11.Cameron Joyce, 12.Mitchell Dell, 17.Zach Rakkas, 18.Alastair Oliver, 19.Glyn Tamlin (c), 20.Matthew Magann, 22.Christian Starkie (gk), 23.Cameron White

Tassie Tigers Men’s team: 4.Hayden Beltz, 5.Benjamin Austin, 6.Josh Brooks, 7.Josh Mardell, 8.Joseph Murphy, 9.Jeremy Edwards, 11.Eddie Ockenden, 12.Sam McCulloch, 13.Joshua Beltz (c), 15.Kieron Arthur, 19.Tim Deavin, 20.James Bourke, 23.Henry Chambers (gk), 26.Oliver Smith, 27.Gobindraj Gill

Women’s Match

A Gabi Nance masterclass has helped guide Adelaide Fire to a crucial 2-0 victory at home against a plucky Tassie Tigers women’s side in round two action of the Sultana Bran Hockey One League. A brilliantly scripted penalty corner routine enabled the Adelaide Fire to catch the Tigers napping in the opening minute, with Hockeyroo Jane Claxton assisting teammate Chloe Carter for a tap in. Having taken the ball outside the dotted circle, the Fire took full advantage of the conversion rule with Carter duly stepping forward to take the score to 2-0. It was a comprehensive performance from the hosts in the first quarter, with an under-siege Tigers goalkeeper Evie Dalton forced to make six important saves and negate five penalty corners. The Tigers looked to have pulled a goal back in the 23rd minute when Jillian Wolgemuth threaded a pass to skipper Maddy Murphy to deflect home on her reverse. But ecstasy quickly turned to agony for the visiting side, with the goal ultimately ruled out after the umpires conferred. The match then became a war of attrition as both teams applied intense pressure in the front half of the ground and when intercepting, looked to get possession going forward quickly. As the Tigers threw the kitchen sink at finding a way back into the clash, the Adelaide Fire midfield trio of Miki Spano, Nance and Claxton were able to manage the game. For the second consecutive week, Nance stood head and shoulders above her rivals on an individual level to remind Hockeyroos selectors of her immense ability. Speaking post-match, Nance was delighted to earn their first win in this year’s competition.

“It’s pretty amazing. The turnout tonight has been incredible and while it’s so nice to win, it’s even better to win at home,” a jubilant Nance said.

“I’m really proud of the girls’ performance, but of course it’s always nice to have a good game too.”

In regards to the match-winning penalty corner variation, Nance’s response suggested there could be more surprises in store for Fire fans in the matches ahead.

“We just wanted to utilise the outside the five so we could use the conversion rule and our coach Jason Butcher has got some pretty unique skills and we just adapt to them.”

Adelaide will return to action with a back-to-back home match against NSW Pride, who will be fresh off a bye, on Friday October 14 at 6pm local time. Meanwhile, the Tassie Tigers have plenty of time to lick their wounds with their next contest at home against the Canberra Chill on Thursday October 20 from 6:30pm local time.

Match Details

Adelaide Fire 2 (Carter 2’/3’)

Tassie Tigers 0

Saturday 8 October 2022

MATE Stadium

Umpires: Cassidy Gallagher & Kristy Robertson

Adelaide Fire Women’s team: 4.Chloe Carter, 5.Kelsey Bing (gk), 8.Holly Evans-Gill, 10.Carly Hoffmann, 11.Lucy Sharman, 13.Sarah Harrison, 15.Jane Claxton, 16.Jet Mallinson, 17.Siennah Cowles, 18.Erin Cameron, 19.Gabi Nance, 20.Hattie Shand, 21.Miki Spano, 23.Izzy Gill, 30.Julia King

Tassie Tigers Women’s team: 1.Sarah McCambridge, 2.Jillian Wolgemuth, 4.Maddi Brooks, 5.Taylor Brooks, 6.Raeleigh Phillips, 7.Maddy Murphy (c), 8.Cassie Sumfest, 9.Emily Donovan, 11.Eliza Westland, 12.Lou Maddock, 14.Brooke DeBerdine, 17.Grace Calvert, 20.Beth Dobbie, 21.Lauren Canning, 25.Evie Dalton (gk)

=== Round 3 ===
Bye

=== Round 4 ===
Men’s Match

The Canberra Chill silenced a parochial Hobart home crowd with a stunning come-from-behind victory to defeat the Tassie Tigers in a thrilling penalty shootout 3-2 after scores were locked 4-4 at full time. In a captivating Sultana Bran Hockey One League clash, the Tigers incredibly led 4-1 inside the final three minutes of regular time, before Davis Atkin lifted the Chill off the canvas with a thunderbolt strike from the circle’s edge. When Atkin completed his conversion opportunity with aplomb to make it 4-3, just one minute and forty-five seconds remained on the clock. As Tassie tried frantically to kill the match, the Chill mounted one final foray forward and earned a penalty corner attempt with just twelve seconds remaining. Up stepped James Day, who had earlier seen a tame penalty stroke well saved by Tigers keeper Henry Chambers, and he slammed home the equaliser to take the match to a shootout.

Both sides converted their opening opportunities through Gary Backhus and Josh Beltz for their respective teams before Jack Staines and Eddie Ockenden were both denied by world-class goalkeeping. Atkin returned to haunt the Tigers, coolly sweeping beyond Chambers to score, while hat-trick hero Jack Welch failed to find the target for Tassie. Day and Hayden Beltz then traded conversions to have the Chill 3-2 up, but Aiden Dooley’s effort to claim victory for the visitors was denied by a clutch Chambers. Needing to score to keep the Tigers in the hunt, Jeremy Edwards was denied by an unbelievable double save from Kookaburras keeper Andrew Charter to clinch the unlikeliest of victories.Speaking post-match, Chill coach Seyi Onitiri was proud of the collective effort of his side and encouraged them to soak up and enjoy the moment.

“We’re very happy with the win and there are things that happened in that game that we’ll have to work on, but it’s hard to win games at this level so, for the moment, we’ll just savour the win and pick apart those moments later,” Onitiri said post-game.

“Even when we were down though, we just stuck to our processes and the shape was pretty good and the work rate was good. We missed a (penalty) stroke, we missed a few others things but the guys didn’t get their heads down, so we’re pretty excited.”

Onitiri also reserved praise for the performance of Atkin, who narrowly missed selection for the Burras Sultan of Johor Cup team that is currently competing overseas.

“He’s very important for us and I’m just thrilled for him. He’s a young guy that has worked really hard. We were hoping he’d actually be away with the Australian Under 21 team at the moment, but we think he’s playing great hockey and I’m thrilled he was able to put in a performance like that.”

Earlier, the return of Kookaburras forward Welch had stolen the show, as he needed just four minutes to mark his return with a deft deflection goal into the roof of the net. A remarkable stick save that simply had to be seen to be believed from Charter denied Welch’s conversion attempt. Seemingly well beaten, Charter thrust his stick around his back without any sight of Welch and got a piece of the ball to knock it wide. Inspired by his heroics, the Chill levelled the scores up when Day’s penalty corner could only be parried into the net by Chambers in the 26th minute. In the shadows of half-time, Welch earned a penalty stroke for a crunching tackle and Edwards duly converted from the penalty spot, before Welch dropped the ball underneath Charter to make it 3-1. Edwards then returned the favour of the Chill, cleaning up Ben Staines, but Day’s penalty stroke attempt was well negotiated by Chambers. With that let off, Welch completed his hat-trick barely a minute later with a penalty corner flick and leading 4-1 with less than three minutes to go the home side appeared comfortable winners.

The Tigers next go in search of points away against the Perth Thundersticks on Saturday night, while the Chill can consolidate their top four spot with victory against the Adelaide Fire on Thursday.

Match Details

Tassie Tigers 4 (Welch 4’/30’/35’, Edwards 30’)

Canberra Chill 4 (Day 26’/60+, Atkin 59’/59’)

Canberra Chill won 3-2 on penalties

Thursday 20 October 2022

Tasmanian Hockey Centre

Umpires: Tim Sheahan & Aaron Gotting

Tassie Tigers Men’s team: 4.Hayden Beltz, 5.Benjamin Austin, 7.Josh Mardell, 8.Joseph Murphy, 9.Jeremy Edwards, 11.Eddie Ockenden, 13.Joshua Beltz (c), 14.Jack Welch, 15.Kieron Arthur, 19.Tim Deavin, 20.James Bourke, 22.Oliver Pritchard, 23.Henry Chambers (gk), 26.Oliver Smith, 27.Gobindraj Gill

Canberra Chill Men’s team: 2.Ben Staines, 3.Anand Gupte, 4.James Day, 6.Connor Tuddenham, 7.Ben Craig (c), 8.Sean Baker, 9.Jamie Hawke, 10.Owen Chivers, 11.Gary Backhus, 12.Jake Staines, 14.Glenn Turner, 15.Hayden Dillon, 17.Aidan Dooley, 24.Davis Atkin, 30.Andrew Charter (gk)

Women’s Match

A masterclass from Kalindi Commerford has inspired the Canberra Chill to a 3-0 victory away to a gallant Tassie Tigers side and sent them top of the Sultana Bran Hockey One League on goal difference for the first time. Depending on other results, the Chill’s occupancy on top spot may only be temporary but their performance demonstrated they can be a force to be reckoned with. Commerford would have covered virtually every blade of turf at the Tasmanian Hockey Centre in one of her finest displays of aggressive ball running, before recognising her team’s victory in her own unique way post-match.

“It was a great performance by the girls. It’s always hard playing in front of a crowd that’s not your own, travelling too because it was quite a big trip for us from Tasmania to Canberra, so I’m really proud of the girls and the effort we put out,” Commerford said post-match.

Commerford also stated that she believes the team can do more damage in the Hockey One League and have plenty of petrol left in the tank.

“(We can go) all the way baby! But it’s a game-by-game approach for us. We’re very much a stay in the moment team, whether it’s SnapChat, team talk, training, game, it’s moment by moment.”

Tassie had opened the match impressively with Jillian Wolgemuth sliding the first attempt on goal for the hosts, while Canberra continued their barren run from the set piece. Debutant Lauren Yee was impressive, combining with Commerford on countless times and slamming a tomahawk strike inches wide of the near post. The match was placed on the Chill’s terms when Stephanie Kindon deflected home in the 23rd minute after fast stickwork from skipper Naomi Evans. Tigers goalkeeper Cami Vaughan came up trumps to deny the conversion attempt in an eye-catching display on her debut, while down the other end, the Tigers calls for a penalty stroke were waved away as half-time approached. The Tigers were awarded back-to-back set piece opportunities in the third quarter but failed to test Chill shot stopper Rene Hunter with their planned field goal option and their wastefulness was punished in the 42nd minute as Shihori Oikawa scored from a penalty stroke. Despite a great first save from Vaughan, Madison Doar converted to stretch the Chill’s advantage to 3-0, where it would remain as their game management prowess came to the fore. The Chill will return home to face the Adelaide Fire next Thursday night from 6:30pm in a fascinating test of either side’s title hopes, while the Tigers will head to Western Australia to face the Perth Thundersticks on Saturday night.

Match Details

Tassie Tigers 0

Canberra Chill 3 (Kindon 23’, Oikawa 42’, M.Doar 42’)

Thursday 20 October 2022

Tasmanian Hockey Centre

Umpires: Nicola Brown & Rhiannon Murrie

Tassie Tigers Women’s team: 1.Sarah McCambridge, 2.Jillian Wolgemuth, 4.Maddi Brooks, 5.Taylor Brooks, 6.Raeleigh Phillips, 7.Maddy Murphy (c), 8.Cassie Sumfest, 9.Emily Donovan, 11.Eliza Westland, 12.Lou Maddock, 14.Brooke DeBerdine, 15.Lucy Cooper, 20.Beth Dobbie, 21.Lauren Canning, 23.Camilla Vaughan (gk)

Canberra Chill Women’s team: 4.Madison Doar, 6.Katie Doar, 7.Naomi Evans (c), 8.Laura Reid, 11.Sophie Gaughan, 14.Emily Robson, 16.Shihori Oikawa, 18.Olivia Martin, 20.Stephanie Kindon, 21.Mikaela Patterson, 23.Kalindi Commerford, 24.Sarah White, 25.Lauren Yee, 28.Catriona Bailey-Price, 32.Rene Hunter (gk)

=== Round 6 ===
Men’s Match

The Tassie Tigers have roared back into title contention with a clinical 2-1 defeat of the NSW Pride, with Kookaburras star Jeremy Hayward marking his return to the Sultana Bran Hockey One League with a goal. In a captivating and physical match that saw neither side give an inch, the Tigers set piece prowess and attacking half creativity was the difference between the two sides. Hayward only flew back into Australia on Tuesday and whilst admitting to being a little tired, was really happy with the team’s performance.

“I got back Tuesday and I’m a little tired today, but in the end, it was a good result. I’m pretty happy to be back with the Tassie boys,” Hayward said.

“All the talk was about the guys that are missing but they’re still a good side. Those young guys, they’re quicker than me some of them but they’re still a strong side and it was a tough outing, even with the eight penalty corners for us.”

In claiming victory, the Tigers buried the ghosts of their late fadeout to the Canberra Chill and leapfrogged them into fourth place on the table.

“We talked about the red zone late in the game, being very careful and able to control the game in the last five minutes, and not be safe in a way but be controlling and in charge,” Hayward explained.

“We did that with our passing I thought. Our midfield was really strong, their presence in there and the red zone was really important, so we did well.”

Ash Thomas was massive in the net for the Pride to defend the eight penalty corner opportunities for the hosts, but even he could do little as Hayward sent a tracer-bullet flick high into the net to opening the scoring after 11 minutes. NSW Pride had earned the opening shot of the match through Ehren Hazell but were then starved of opportunities as Tigers defenders Tim Deavin and Jeremy Edwards stamped their authority. Approaching half-time, the Tigers doubled their advantage when Jack Welch flicked truly from their fifth set piece of the half, and it would have been difficult to argue that the hosts hadn’t been good for that 2-0 lead. NSW Pride responded and went up a gear off the back off intelligent passing from Dylan Martin and Sam Gray, while Jack Hayes tried to provide good ball running. Their efforts were rewarded when Ky Willott scored in the 37th minute and it was game on. Tigers goalkeeper Henry Chambers was forced into a remarkable double save and another huge stretch with his right foot, before his opposing number Thomas then tried to outdo him. Thomas initially saved from a crash ball from Eddie Ockenden, who dazzled in possession throughout the second half, and the keeper recovered from the floor to save a seemingly certain Josh Brooks tomahawk goal on the cusp of three-quarter time. The Pride continued to throw numbers forward in the final term, but their efforts were thwarted by a yellow card to Callum Mackay. The Tigers had some late opportunities to excitement machine Ruben Hoey and Hayward, before they implemented their game management skills to close out the win. Tassie will now face a nervous test watching the Chill battle the Perth Thundersticks tomorrow, before heading to face HC Melbourne on Thursday night from 6:30pm, while NSW simply must beat the Chill in Parkes on Saturday to secure a ticket to Bendigo in a thrilling finale to the second edition.

Match Details

Tassie Tigers 2 (Hayward 11’, Welch 28’)

NSW Pride 1 (Willott 38’)

Friday 4 November 2022

Tasmanian Hockey Centre

Umpires: Jayden Pearson & Tim Sheahan

Tassie Tigers Men’s team: 2.Tyler McDonald, 4.Hayden Beltz, 6.Josh Brooks, 7.Josh Mardell, 9.Jeremy Edwards, 10.Ruben Hoey, 11.Eddie Ockenden, 13.Joshua Beltz (c), 14.Jack Welch, 15.Kieron Arthur, 19.Tim Deavin, 22.Oliver Pritchard, 23.Henry Chambers (gk), 27.Gobindraj Gill, 32.Jeremy Hayward

NSW Pride Men’s team: 5.Ash Thomas (gk), 7.Daine Richards, 8.Nathaniel Stewart, 9.Nathan Czinner, 14.Dylan Martin, 15.Miles Davis, 19.Tom Brown, 20.Ky Willott, 23.Ryan Proctor, 25.Jack Hayes (c), 26.Ehren Hazell, 28.Sam Gray, 32.Callum Mackay, 33.Sam Mudford, 35.Rory Walker

=== Round 7 ===
Men’s Match

The Tassie Tigers’ finals hopes were crushed by a dominant HC Melbourne performance, as the hosts farewelled Victorian hockey legend Russell Ford in perfect fashion. Needing a win to secure their ticket to Bendigo next weekend, the Tigers never reached the heights of their earlier performances to be overwhelmed 6-2 by the home side. The victory for HC Melbourne was also a case of too little too late for their 2022 campaign but demonstrated their potential to contend in next year’s edition, according to skipper Josh Simmonds.

“One hundred percent this win really builds our momentum heading into next season,” Simmonds said post-match.

“This was another big win for a young club, so I couldn’t be more rapped (with their consecutive big win victories to end the season).”

After conceding twenty-two goals in the opening four rounds, Simmonds attributed HC Melbourne’s recipe for success as stemming from their defensive efforts.

“It’s been a big focus for our defence, about closing out games, and circle defence was a big one,” said Simmonds.

“We definitely were under pressure in that last quarter, but at the other end of the spectrum to put away that many goals is really, really good.”

At the final siren, former Kookaburras star Ford brought down the curtain on his 20 year national hockey league career in front of family and friends, including his six week old child.

“It’s been a fun twenty years or whatever it’s been. I’ve loved running out with all these boys each and every week and I told them before the game that they are the reason I keep coming back to play each year. But it’s nice to finish on a win tonight and it was good fun,” Ford said.

The match itself will be a horrid replay watch for the Tigers, as they conceded two early half chances to Nathan Copey. Damon Steffens opened the scoring with a blistering penalty corner flick in the 13th minute, as the Tigers were reduced to ten men with the sin binning of Gobind Gill. Similarly, Jeremy Hayward smashed home an equaliser in the 21st minute as HC Melbourne were down to ten players with Jonathan Bretherton’s dismissal. The pattern sadly continued with Tiger Josh Brooks yellow carded, as Nathan Ephraums appeared to deflect home from Steffens’ incisive pass with just sixteen seconds remaining in the first half. Ephraums, named by Kookaburras goalkeeper Andrew Charter as the best one on one penalty taker in the country pre-tournament, duly stepped up to effortlessly convert into the roof of the net and make it 3-1 at the main break. Still down a player, HC Melbourne edged further ahead when Simmonds converted a penalty stroke, awarded after a controversial penalty corner had been given to put the Tigers out of the fry pan and into the fire. 17 year old Ruben Hoey almost pegged a remarkable goal back for the Tigers but sent his effort from Eddie Ockenden inches wide, before Hayward landed his second of the match to make it 4-2. But no sooner were they back in touch, HC Melbourne scored two quick goals through Craig Marais and Steffens to take they lead back to four goals. The Tigers, with destiny slipping from their hands, threw the kitchen sink at the hosts in the final term but their efforts were repelled as their party was well and truly spoiled. Both sides will now contemplate what could have been, as the top four challengers for the Sultana Bran Hockey One League title were confirmed.

Match Details

HC Melbourne 6 (Steffens 13’/45’, Ephraums 30’/30’, Simmonds 32’, Marais 43’)

Tassie Tigers 2 (Hayward 21’/41’)

Thursday 10 November 2022

Melbourne Sports Centre – Parkville

Umpires: Jim Unkles & Ben Hocking

HC Melbourne Men’s team: 1.Craig Marais, 2.Max Hendry, 3.Jonathan Bretherton, 4.Liam Henderson, 5.Doug Buckley, 6.Damon Steffens, 7.Nathan Ephraums, 8.Lachlan Steinfort, 10.Russell Ford, 11.Cooper Burns, 13.Jayshaan Randhawa, 15.Josh Simmonds (c), 17.Kiran Arunasalam, 18.Johan Durst (gk), 22.Nathan Copey

Tassie Tigers Men’s team: 2.Tyler McDonald, 4.Hayden Beltz, 6.Josh Brooks, 7.Josh Mardell, 9.Jeremy Edwards, 10.Ruben Hoey, 11.Eddie Ockenden, 13.Joshua Beltz (c), 14.Jack Welch, 15.Kieron Arthur, 19.Tim Deavin, 22.Oliver Pritchard, 23.Henry Chambers (gk), 27.Gobindraj Gill, 32.Jeremy Hayward

Women’s Match

HC Melbourne have sent out an ominous warning to their title rivals, sealing top spot after the regular season with a 10-3 defeat of the Tassie Tigers in Melbourne. Incredible four goal hauls from returning star Madi Ratcliffe and Olivia Downes and a fine brace from Belgium Joanne Peeters inside the first three quarters set up a record women’s Hockey One League score line. Tassie were overwhelmed by the class of HC Melbourne, led by Hockeyroos star Amy Lawton and New Zealander Hannah Cotter, but fought hard to earn two goals from Lucy Cooper and another from Maddy Brooks. But it was the story around Ratcliffe’s incredible return from a nasty knee injury that stole the show, with the former Hockeyroo taking just 45 seconds to register her first two goals and scoring twice more from set pieces.

“I’m so sore. That was a bit of a blow out for me,” Ratcliffe said post-match.

“I haven’t played much hockey because of my injury but I just wanted to contribute to the girls.”

“Obviously, they have finished top of the ladder, so I’m just happy to play a little part.”

While the score line indicated a resounding victory for the home side, Ratcliffe was delighted to see her side raise their performance on the cusp of the final’s series in Bendigo next weekend.

“I think that they (Tassie) have some really strong players in their team and are unlucky they didn’t make finals, but I’m super happy with the way that we played,” Ratcliffe added.

“It was the first game I’ve been a part of this year and I was really impressed with the girls, especially some of the young ones, so it’s really exciting moving forward this week hopefully.”

Earlier, Ratcliffe’s opening minute fireworks were all that the home side had to show for a dominant first quarter, before five goals in seven second quarter minutes broke the match wide open. Downes’ two converted field goals were split by Ratcliffe’s third from a penalty corner as they feasted upon the young Tigers side. But the visitors weren’t without their own scoring opportunities, with a brilliant tomahawk shot from Maddy Brooks striking the upright post, before a late scramble from Carly James prevented the rebound from rolling across the line. Brooks returned shorter after to assist Cooper, who deftly touched home through the near post and duly converted to ensure the half-time siren sounded with a 7-2 half-time score line. Peeters smashed a goal into the top lefthand corner of the net and converted with a neat tomahawk goal to make it 9-2, before Ratcliffe made it double figures with a deflected flick. The goals dried up but the action was still unrelenting, as the Tigers squandered four set pieces before Brooks earned a late consolation goal with her trademark quick thinking and tomahawk finish. HC Melbourne will now head to Bendigo’s Finals Main Event full of confidence that they can go one better than the 2019 edition but must await the results of Friday and Saturday’s remaining fixtures before their semi-final opponent is known.

Match Details

HC Melbourne 10 (Ratcliffe 1’/1’/25’/42’, Downes 23’/23’/29’/29’, Peeters 38’/38’)

Tassie Tigers 3 (Cooper 29’/29’, M.Brooks 60’)

Thursday 10 November 2022

Melbourne Sports Centre – Parkville

Umpires: Iris Milham & Nicola Brown

HC Melbourne Women’s team: 1.Bridget Laurance (gk), 2.Ash Utri, 3.Nicola Hammond, 4.Amy Lawton, 5.Krissy Bates, 86.Josie Lawton, 8.Hannah Cotter, 9.Carly James, 11.Joanne Peeters, 12.Emily Hamilton-Smith, 13.Megan Alakus, 14.Anna Moore, 15.Olivia Downes, 22.Madi Ratcliffe, 25.Hannah Gravenall (c)

Tassie Tigers Women’s team: 1.Sarah McCambridge, 3.Hannah Richardson, 4.Maddi Brooks, 5.Taylor Brooks, 7.Maddy Murphy (c), 8.Cassie Sumfest, 9.Emily Donovan, 10.Kiah Williams, 11.Eliza Westland, 12.Lou Maddock, 14.Brooke DeBerdine, 15.Lucy Cooper, 20.Beth Dobbie, 21.Lauren Canning, 25.Evie Dalton (gk)

== 2019 Season ==
=== Round 1 ===
Tassie Tigers – BYE

Tassie Tigers Women’s squad: Holly Bonde, Phillida Bridley, Esmee Broekhuizen, Lauren Canning, Jessica Chesterman, Emily Donovan, Jean Flanagan, Nicole Geeves, Molly Haas, Ruby Haywood, Madeleine Hinton, Caashia Karringten, Katerina Lacina, Samantha Lawrence, Sarah McCambridge, Hannah Richardson, Sophie Rockefeller, Isabelle Sharman, Laura Spandler, Amelia Spence

Tassie Tigers Men’s squad: Kieron Arthur, Hayden Beltz, Joshua Beltz, James Bourke, Joshua Brooks, Kurt Budgeon, Henry Chambers, Tim Deavin, Eddie Ockenden, Gobindraj Gill, Jeremy Hayward, Nicolas Leslie, Joshua Mardell, Sam McCambridge, Linden McCarthy, Sam McCulloch, Benjamin Read, Oliver Smith, Jack Welch, Grant Woodcock

=== Round 2 ===
Men: The Tassie Tigers Men gave plenty for the parochial home support to cheer about in their first match of the season as they put five goals past Adelaide Fire.

Nick Leslie opened the scoring for the home side with a field goal and doubled the advantage when he beat Adelaide Fire keeper Eddie Chittleborough again with the resultant conversion chance.

Sam McCambridge then made it 3-0 in the 24th minute before Darwin born Kookaburra Jeremy Hayward endeared himself to the Tasmanian faithful with a successful drag flick from a penalty corner on the stroke of half time. Hayden Beltz rounded off the scoring for the hosts before Zendana Hirotaka struck a late consolation for the Fire.

Tassie’s ominous first up performance sets up a mouth watering clash against Brisbane Blaze men next weekend after the Queenslanders made it back-to-back wins, two last quarter goals seeing them outlast HC Melbourne 4-2.

Tassie Tigers 5 (Leslie 10’/10’, McCambridge 24’, Hayward 28’, H.Beltz 43’)

Adelaide Fire 1 (Hirotaka 57’)

Saturday 5 October 2019

Tasmanian Hockey Centre (TAS)

Tassie Tigers Men’s team: 2.Nick Leslie, 3.Kurt Budgeon, 4.Hayden Beltz, 6.Joshua Brooks, 11.Eddie Ockenden (c), 12.Samuel McCulloch, 13.Joshua Beltz, 15.Kieron Arthur, 18.Grant Woodcock (GK), 19.Tim Devan, 20.James Bourke, 21.Ben Read, 29.Sam McCambridge, 32.Jeremy Hayward

Adelaide Fire Men’s team: 3.Lachlan Busiko, 6.Angus Fry, 9.Fred Gray, 11.Cameron Joyce, 13.Luke Larwood, 15.Andrew Leat, 18.Alastair Oliver, 19.Glyn Tamlin (c), 21.Simon Wells, 22.Chris Wells, 23.Cameron White, 24.Zendana Hirotaka, 25.Watenabe Kota, 29.Eddie Chittleborough (GK)

Women: Adelaide Fire Women were particularly impressive as they accounted for the Tassie Tigers 4-0 in front of a bumper crowd in Hobart. All four goals, which included a double to Miki Spano, came in the second half to put them on top of the table.

Tassie Tigers 0

Adelaide Fire 4 (Spano 32’/56’, Nance 34’, de Broughe 43’)

Saturday 5 October 2019

Tasmanian Hockey Centre (TAS)

Tassie Tigers Women’s team: 1.Sarah McCambridge, 2.Amelia Spence (c), 3.Hannah Richardson, 4.Nicole Geeves, 5.Molly Haas, 8.Holly Bonde (GK), 9.Emily Donovan, 10.Laura Spandler, 13.Phillida Bridley, 15.Sophie Rockefeller, 16.Samantha Lawrence, 19.Esmee Broekhuizen, 20.Katerina Lacina, 23.Caashia Karrington

Adelaide Fire Women’s team: 3.Brooklyn Buchecker, 6.Jane Claxton, 7.Emma de Broughe, 8.Holly Evans (c), 13.Sarah Harrison, 15.Euleena Maclachlan, 17.Karri McMahon, 19.Gabi Nance, 20.Hattie Shand, 21.Miki Spano, 22.Leah Welstead, 23. Gemma McCaw, 25.Kate Denning, 30.Ashlee Wells (GK)

=== Round 3 ===
Men: The NSW Pride and Brisbane Blaze have maintained their unblemished starts to the inaugural Sultana Bran Hockey One season following solid wins in Round 3.

But it was some exceptional individual performances, from Pride forward Blake Govers and Blaze’s Joel Rintala, that created the big talking points. The duo both scored four goals, Govers scoring every one in his team’s 4-2 victory over the Tassie Tigers, while Rintala was in red hot form as the Blaze accounted for Adelaide Fire 5-1.

Despite Govers’ four goal haul, NSW Pride did not have it all their own way, needing to come from 2-1 down after Sam McCambridge and Eddie Ockenden had given the Tassie Tigers an early lead in a high quality affair. But having struck the opening goal in the 5th minute, Govers scored three more times in the space of eight minutes to seal the result and take his tally to seven for the season.

NSW Pride 4 (Govers 5’/25’/29’/33’)

Tassie Tigers 2 (McCambridge 9’, Ockenden 13’)

Saturday 12 October 2019

Sydney Olympic Park Hockey Centre (NSW)

NSW Pride Men’s team: 1.Lachlan Sharp, 2.Tom Craig, 5.Ash Thomas (GK), 6.Matthew Dawson, 8.Nathanael Stewart, 11.Hayden Dillon, 12.Kurt Lovett, 13.Blake Govers, 18.Tristan White (c), 19.Jack Hayes, 20.Ky Willott, 22.Flynn Ogilvie, 23.Ryan Proctor, 29.Timothy Brand

Tassie Tigers Men’s team: 2.Nicolas Leslie, 4.Hayden Beltz, 6.Joshua Brooks, 7.Joshua Mardell, 10.Linden McCarthy, Eddie Ockenden (c), 13.Joshua Beltz, 15.Kieron Arthur, 18.Grant Woodcock (GK), 19.Tim Deavin, 20.James Bourke, 21.Benjamin Read, 26.Oliver Smith, 29.Sam McCambridge.

Women: In Sydney, Wilson opened her account with a darting backstick goal in the 5th minute and then doubled the lead in the resultant one-on-one conversion attempt to give the Pride a dream start against the Tassie Tigers.

The 19 year old’s hat-trick came just before half time, while debutant NSW Pride goalkeeper Jess Parr made some crucial saves during the third term to deny the Tassie Tigers. Then in the final minute Wilson slotted another quick fire double to round off a memorable afternoon in a 5-0 triumph against a Tassie Tigers team that has now conceded nine goals and failed to find the net in their opening two matches.

NSW Pride 5 (Wilson 5’/5’/27’/60’/60’)

Tassie Tigers 0

Saturday 12 October 2019

Sydney Olympic Park Hockey Centre (NSW)

NSW Pride Women’s team: 2.Sarah Johnston, 5.Jess Parr (GK), 12.Mikaela Patterson, 16.Jessica Watterson, 19.Morgan Blamey, 20.Maddison Smith, 21.Alice Arnott, 22.Kate Jenner (c), 23.Abby Wilson, 27.Renae Robinson, 28.Casey Sablowski, 29.Courtney Schonell, 31.Emma Spinks, 32.Grace Young

Tassie Tigers Women’s team: 1.Sarah McCambridge, 2.Amelia Spence (c), 3.Hannah Richardson, 4.Nicole Geeves, 5.Molly Haas, 8.Holly Bonde (GK), 9.Emily Donovan, 10.Laura Spandler, 13.Phillida Bridley, 15.Sophie Rockefeller, 16.Samantha Lawrence, 19.Esmee Broekhuizen, 20.Katerina Lacina, 21.Lauren Canning

=== Round 4 ===
Men: Brisbane Blaze 7 (Beale 1’, Rintala 17’, Weyer 25’, D.Wotherspoon 36’/36’/38’/38’)

Tassie Tigers 0

Friday 18 October 2019

State Hockey Centre (QLD)

Brisbane Blaze Men’s team: 3.Corey Weyer, 4.Hugh Pembroke, 5.Scott Boyde, 7.Joel Rintala, 9.Jacob Anderson, 10.Robert Bell, 12.Jake Whetton, 15.Justin Douglas, 16.Tim Howard, 19.Blake Wotherspoon, 20.Matthew Swann (c), 23.Daniel Beale, 26.Dylan Wotherspoon, 32.Mitchell Nicholson (GK)

Tassie Tigers Men’s team: 2.Nicholas Leslie, 3.Kurt Budgeon, 4.Hayden Beltz, 6.Joshua Brooks, 7.Joshua Mardell, 11.Eddie Ockenden (c), 13.Joshua Beltz, 15.Kieron Arthur, 19.Tim Deavin, 20.James Bourke, 21.Ben Read, 23.Henry Chambers (GK), 29.Sam McCambridge, 32.Jeremy Hayward

Women: Brisbane Blaze 5 (Harris 8’, Wilkinson 15’/15’/42’, Fey 38’)

Tassie Tigers 0

Friday 18 October 2019

State Hockey Centre (QLD)

Brisbane Blaze Women’s team: 1.Savannah Fitzpatrick, 3.Layla Eleison, 4.Ashlea Fey (c), 6.Morgan Gallagher, 9.Jesse Reid, 10.Maddie James, 11.Ashlyn McBurnie, 12.Kendra Fitzpatrick, 14.Meg Pearce, 15.Hannah Astbury (GK), 20.Aleisha Neumann, 22.Britt Wilkinson, 23.Ruby Harris, 24.Claire Colwill

Tassie Tigers Women’s team: 1.Sarah McCambridge, 2.Amelia Spence (c), 4.Nicole Geeves, 5.Molly Haas, 9.Emily Donovan, 10.Laura Spandler, 12.Ashleigh Arthur, 13.Phillida Bridley, 15.Sophie Rockefeller, 16.Samantha Lawrence, 19.Esmee Broekhuizen, 20.Katerina Lacina, 21.Lauren Canning, 22.Ruby-Rose Haywood (GK)

=== Round 5 ===
Men: Canberra Chill 2 (Kentaro 31’/31’)

Tassie Tigers 6 (Ockenden 4’/15’/53’/53’, Hayward 24’, McCambridge 33’)

Sunday 20 October 2019

National Hockey Centre (ACT)

Canberra Chill Men’s team: 2.Ben Staines, 4.James Day, 7.Kazuma Murata, 8.Daniel Conroy, 9.Jamie Hawke, 10.Owen Chivers, 11.Garry Backhus, 12.Jake Staines (c), 13.Manabu Yamashita, 17.Aaron Kershaw, 22.Jay MacDonald, 26.James Jewell, 27.Kentaro Fukuda, 30.Andrew Charter (GK)

Tassie Tigers Men’s team: 2.Nicholas Leslie, 4.Hayden Beltz, 6.Joshua Brooks, 11.Eddie Ockenden (c), 13.Joshua Beltz, 14.Jack Welch, 15.Kieron Arthur, 19.Tim Deavin, 20.James Bourke, 21.Ben Read, 23.Henry Chambers (GK), 26.Oliver Smith, 29.Sam McCambridge, 32.Jeremy Hayward

Women: Canberra Chill 2 (Evans 30’/30’)

Tassie Tigers 1 (Canning 19’)

Sunday 20 October 2019

National Hockey Centre (ACT)

Canberra Chill Women’s team: 4.Jess Smith, 7.Naomi Evans (c), 9.Sassie Economos, 10.Rebecca Lee, 11.Sophie Gaughan, 12.Aleisha Price, 14.Emily Robson, 16.Shihori Oikawa, 17.Beckie Middleton, 18.Olivia Martin, 19.Anna Flanagan, 25.Tina Taseska, 27.Meredith Bone, 31.Sakiyo Asano (GK)

Tassie Tigers Women’s team: 1.Sarah McCambridge, 2.Amelia Spence (c), 3.Hannah Richardson, 4.Nicole Geeves, 5.Molly Haas, 9.Emily Donovan, 10.Laura Spandler, 13.Phillida Bridley, 15.Sophie Rockefeller, 16.Samantha Lawrence, 19.Esmee Broekhuizen, 20.Katerina Lacina, 21.Lauren Canning, 22.Ruby-Rose Haywood (GK)

=== Round 6 ===
Men: The Tassie Tigers and HC Melbourne then produced a genuine thriller at the Tasmanian Hockey Centre which would have had hockey fans licking their lips in anticipation for finals.

The visitors looked on their way to a convincing victory when they held a 4-1 half time lead thanks to Nathan Ephraums’ opener and then a stunning second quarter hat-trick from in form Kookaburras forward Josh Simmonds.

That advantage stretched out to 5-1 when Simmonds scored his fourth three minutes into the third quarter to have HC Melbourne cruising, but the Tassie Tigers had other ideas.

When Sam McCambridge scored his second and then Jeremy Hayward pulled another one back less than a minute later, it was 5-3 with a quarter to play.

Enter Eddie Ockenden. The Tigers and Kookaburras captain struck a minute into the final period to cut the deficit to one before he rounded off one of the great comebacks with less than 90 seconds to go as he scored from open play and then converted the clutch subsequent one-on-one opportunity to send the home crowd into raptures.

The win secures Tassie’s top four spot, while despite the gut-wrenching loss, HC Melbourne only need to beat the Adelaide Fire at home on Sunday or rely on the Tigers beating the Perth Thundersticks next weekend, to ensure they will also feature in the finals.

Tassie Tigers 6 (McCambridge 21’/43’, Hayward 43’, Ockenden 46’/59’/59’)

HC Melbourne 5 (Ephraums 14’, Simmonds 23’/23’/30+’/33’)

Sunday 27 October 2019

Tasmanian Hockey Centre (TAS)

Tassie Tigers Men’s team: 4.Hayden Beltz, 6.Joshua Brooks, 11.Eddie Ockenden (c), 12.Sam McCulloch, 13.Joshua Beltz, 14.Jack Welch, 15.Kieron Arthur, 18.Grant Woodcock (GK), 19.Tim Deavin, 20.James Bourke, 21.Ben Read, 27.Gobindraj Gill, 29.Sam McCambridge, 32.Jeremy Hayward

HC Melbourne Men’s team: 1.Craig Marais, 2.Max Hendry, 3.Simon Borger, 5.Andrew Philpott, 7.Will Gilmour, 9.Nathan Ephraums, 10.Russell Ford (c), 13.Jayshaan Randhawa, 14.Jonathan Bretherton, 15.Josh Simmonds, 18.Johan Durst (GK), 21.Jake Sherren, 25.Aaron Kleinschmidt, 29.Oscar Wookey

Women: In Sunday’s game, HC Melbourne kept their perfect record in tact with a 5-2 win over the Tassie Tigers in Hobart. The win guarantees HC Melbourne top spot and a home semi final regardless of their result against the Adelaide Fire in the final round.

Hannah Gravenall and Madi Ratcliffe both scored a brace, while Molly Haas gave Tassie’s home fans something to cheer about with a consolation double in the last quarter.

Tassie Tigers 2 (Haas 51’/51’)

HC Melbourne 5 (Gravenall 7’/7’, Desmet 33’, Ratcliffe 55’/60’)

Sunday 27 October 2019

Tasmanian Hockey Centre (TAS)

Tassie Tigers Women’s team: 1.Sarah McCambridge, 2.Amelia Spence (c), 4.Nicole Geeves, 5.Molly Haas, 7.Madeleine Hinton, 8.Holly Bonde (GK), 9.Emily Donovan, 10.Laura Spandler, 13.Phillida Bridley, 15.Sophie Rockefeller, 16.Samantha Lawrence, 19.Esmee Broekhuizen, 20.Katerina Lacina, 21.Lauren Canning

HC Melbourne Women’s team: 2.Aisling Utri, 3.Nicola Hammond, 5.Kristina Bates, 6.Claire Messent (c), 7.Kary Chau, 8.Olivia Colasurdo, 10.Laura Desmet, 12.Carly James, 14.Laura Barden, 21.Florine van Grimbergen, 22.Madi Ratcliffe, 23.Samantha Snow, 25.Hannah Gravenall, 30.Nikki Bosman (GK)

=== Round 7 ===
Men: Tassie Tigers enter the finals on the back of a third successive win as they comfortably accounted for the Perth Thundersticks 4-0 at the Tasmanian Hockey Centre.

All of the goals came in the opening 20 minutes, Josh Beltz opening the scoring in the 4th minute, Sam McCambridge continuing his impressive season with a quick fire double before Gobindraj Gill knocked in a fourth in the 19th minute to kiss any outside hopes the Thundersticks had of sneaking into the top four good-bye.

Tassie Tigers 4 (J.Beltz 4’, McCambridge 8’/8’, Gill 19’)

Perth Thundersticks 0

Saturday 2 November 2019

Tasmanian Hockey Centre (TAS)

Tassie Tigers Men’s team: 2.Nicholas Leslie, 4.Hayden Beltz, 11.Eddie Ockenden (c), 12.Sam McCulloch, 13.Josh Beltz, 14.Jack Welch, 15.Kieron Arthur, 19.Tim Deavin, 20.James Bourke, 21.Ben Read, 23.Henry Chambers (GK), 27.Gobindraj Gill, 29.Sam McCambridge, 32.Jeremy Hayward

Perth Thundersticks Men’s team: 1.Brayden King, 4.Jake Harvie, 5.Frazer Gerrard, 7.Tyler Lovell (GK), 8.Coby Green, 9.Dane Gavranich, 10.Tom Wickham, 14.Liam Flynn, 19.Daniel Robertson, 23.Matthew Fisher, 24.Alec Rasmussen, 25.Trent Mitton (c), 26.Brandon Gibbs, 27.Marshall Roberts

Women: The round began in Hobart with the Tassie Tigers producing their best performance of the season to notch their first win and extinguish Perth Thundersticks’ finals hopes in the process.

Needing to defeat the previously winless Tigers to secure a top four spot, the Thundersticks received the perfect start when Karri Somerville struck in the 4th minute. But by half time they found themselves 3-1 down after Sarah McCambridge scored and then Sophie Rockefeller fired home a brace with a field goal and resultant successful conversion.

Renee Rockliff reduced the deficit early in the final quarter but the massive boilover was complete with three minutes remaining as Phillida Bridley scored from general play and then converted her one-on-one opportunity to give the Tigers a thrilling victory and send retiring goalkeeper Holly Bonde off a winner.

Tassie Tigers 5 (McCambridge 25’, Rockefeller 29’/29’, Bridley 57’/57’)

Perth Thundersticks 3 (Somerville 4’, Rockliff 47’, Vanderzwan 60+’)

Saturday 2 November 2019

Tasmanian Hockey Centre (TAS)

Tassie Tigers Women’s team: 1.Sarah McCambridge, 2.Amelia Spence (c), 3.Hannah Richardson, 4.Nicole Geeves, 5.Molly Haas, 8.Holly Bonde (GK), 9.Emily Donovan, 10.Laura Spandler, 13.Phillida Bridley, 15.Sophie Rockefeller, 16.Samantha Lawrence, 19.Esmee Broekhuizen, 20.Katerina Lacina, 21.Lauren Canning

Perth Thundersticks Women’s team: 1.Phillipa Morgan, 3.Candyce Peacock, 4.Jemma Buckley (c), 8.Georgia Wilson, 9.Shanea Tonkin, 12.Liné Malan, 14.Roos Broek, 15.Caitlin Pascov, 16.Karri Somerville, 17.Annie Gibbs, 18.Renee Rockliff, 19.Aleisha Power (GK), 21.Jade Vanderzwan, 29.Agueda Moroni.

=== Finals ===
Men: Brisbane Blaze will be the Pride’s grand final opponents after a dominant 7-1 victory over the Tassie Tigers in Brisbane. The Blaze found themselves three goals up inside six minutes when Jake Whetton scored from open play and then converted the resultant one-on-one conversion opportunity, before fellow Kookaburra Jacob Anderson added the third.

A successful Joel Rintala drag flick made it 4-0 at half time leaving the Tigers needing to produce another monumental comeback similar to the one they pulled off against HC Melbourne a fortnight earlier.

A powerful drag flick from Jeremy Hayward gave the Tigers a glimmer of hope but the Wotherspoon brothers, Blake and Dylan, snuffed out any chance of an upset as the Blaze booked themselves another date with their State of Origin rivals.

The Sultana Bran Hockey One Men’s Grand Final is scheduled to start at 2pm AEDT with the Women’s Grand Final to follow at 4pm.

Tickets will go on sale at 3pm AEDT today through Ticketek. The Sultana Bran Hockey One Grand Finals will be LIVE and exclusive on Fox Sports.

Brisbane Blaze 7 (Whetton 4’/4’, Anderson 6’, Rintala 25’, B.Wotherspoon 43’, D.Wotherspoon 55’/55’)

Tassie Tigers 1 (Hayward 33’)

Saturday 9 November 2019

State Hockey Centre (QLD)

Brisbane Blaze Men’s team: 2.Shane Kenny, 3.Corey Weyer, 4.Hugh Pembroke (c), 5.Scott Boyde, 7.Joel Rintala, 9.Jacob Anderson, 10.Robert Bell, 12.Jake Whetton, 15.Justin Douglas, 16.Tim Howard, 19.Blake Wotherspoon, 23.Daniel Beale, 26.Dylan Wotherspoon, 32.Mitchell Nicholson (GK)

Tassie Tigers Men’s team: 2.Nicholas Leslie, 4.Hayden Beltz, 11.Eddie Ockenden (c), 12.Sam McCulloch, 13.Josh Beltz, 14.Jack Welch, 15.Kieron Arthur, 18.Grant Woodcock (GK), 19.Tim Deavin, 20.James Bourke, 21.Ben Read, 27.Gobindraj Gill, 29.Sam McCambridge, 32.Jeremy Hayward

== Teams ==
=== 2025 Men's Squad ===
The men's all-time appearances and goals have been calculated to the end of the 2024 Season. Can you take the following table: ===2025 Men's Squad=== The men's all-time appearances and goals have been calculated to the end of the 2024 Season.

2025 Squad
| # | Name | Appearances (all time) | Goals (all time) |
|---|---|---|---|
| 1 | Magnus McCausland | 7 | 0 |
| 2 | Harvey Bessell | 2 | 0 |
| 3 | Tyson Johnson | 0 | 0 |
| 4 | Hayden Beltz | 50 | 8 |
| 5 | Matt Bird | 0 | 0 |
| 6 | Josh Brooks | 23 | 4 |
| 7 | Ruben Hoey | 1 | 0 |
| 8 | Evan Kimber | 0 | 0 |
| 9 | Jeremy Edwards | 87 | 7 |
| 10 | Oliver Stebbings | 4 | 0 |
| 11 | Eddie Ockenden | 129 | 51 |
| 13 | Joshua Beltz | 45 | 1 |
| 14 | Jack Welch | 46 | 14 |
| 15 | Oscar Pritchard | 6 | 0 |
| 16 | Alex Hogan-Jones | 7 | 0 |
| 17 | Lachlan Rogers | 8 | 1 |
| 18 | Grant Woodcock | 16 | 0 |
| 19 | Tim Deavin | 132 | 11 |
| 20 | Ehren Hazell | 14 | 5 |
| 24 | Matthew Swann | 0 | 0 |
| 25 | Max Larkin | 4 | 0 |
| 26 | Oliver Smith | 17 | 1 |
| 27 | William Sproule | 0 | 0 |
| 28 | Oscar Sproule | 0 | 0 |
| 77 | Keenan Johnson | 0 | 0 |

=== Women's team ===
The women's appearances have been calculated from the Hockey One 2019 - 2024 Seasons.

2025 Squad
| # | Name | Appearances (Tigers) |
|---|---|---|
| 1 | Kacee Ponting | 1 |
| 2 | Tayla Claxton | 0 |
| 3 | Phillida Bridley | 14 |
| 4 | Jemma Kenworthy | 11 |
| 5 | Zayna Jackson | 0 |
| 6 | Louisa Jacobson | 8 |
| 7 | Taylor Brooks | 14 |
| 8 | Maddison Brooks | 14 |
| 9 | Lily Bushby | 0 |
| 10 | Isabelle Kruimink | 0 |
| 11 | Romani Kenworthy | 3 |
| 12 | Louise Maddock | 5 |
| 14 | Roos Swann | 0 |
| 16 | Madison Clark | 5 |
| 17 | Kathryn Lane | 6 |
| 18 | Jane Claxton | 0 |
| 19 | Stephanie Kershaw | 0 |
| 20 | Beth Dobbie | 11 |
| 21 | Renee Taylor | 0 |
| 22 | Meah Leary | 0 |
| 23 | Holly Gilbar | 7 |
| 25 | Evelyn Dalton | 11 |
| 30 | Jessica Stevens | 0 |
| 61 | Jordyn Holzberger | 0 |

== History ==
Old Tassie Tigers AHL club logo

Historical Results

Men
| Year | Position |
|---|---|
| 2013 | 5th |
| 2014 | 1st |
| 2015 | 3rd |
| 2016 | 7th |
| 2017 | 7th |
| 2018 | 3rd |
| 2019 | 3rd |
| 2020 | Not Held |
| 2021 | Not Held |
| 2022 | 5th |
| 2023 | 4th |
| 2024 | 5th |

Women
| Year | Position |
|---|---|
| 2008 | 6th |
| 2009 | 8th |
| 2010 | - |
| 2011 | 8th |
| 2012 | 8th |
| 2013 | 7th |
| 2014 | 8th |
| 2015 | 8th |
| 2016 | 8th |
| 2017 | 10th |
| 2018 | 8th |
| 2019 | 7th |
| 2020 | Not held |
| 2021 | Not held |
| 2022 | 7th |
| 2023 | 7th |
| 2024 | 4th |

== One Hockey Cup ==
New in 2023, the One Hockey Cup, presents an opportunity to celebrate the combined performances of Men's and Women's teams from the 7 Hockey One League clubs. The One Hockey Cup will be awarded to the Club that ranks highest based on the aggregate scores of their Women's and men's teams at the end of the Regular Season (Rounds 1 - 7).

| Year | Position |
|---|---|
| 2023 | 7th |
| 2024 | 5th |

== Awards ==
=== Individual ===
Player of the Tournament (Men):

- Todd Williams - 1993
- Daniel Sproule - 1998
- Matthew Wells (2) - 2001, 2003
- Zain Wright - 2002
- Eddie Ockenden (5) - 2011, 2013, 2014, 2015, 2024

Player of the Tournament (Women):

- Gitte Michels - 2024

Tournament Highest Goalscorer:

- Craig Keegan (2) - 1999 (15 Goals), 2000 (10 Goals)
- Marcus Richardson - 2007 (12 Goals)
- Eddie Ockenden - 2011 (11 Goals)
- Kieron Arthur - 2017 (9 Goals)

Player of the Final:

- Tristan Clemons - 2014

=== Team ===
Tournament Champions: 2014

Play the Whistle Award: 2014, 2015
