= Jack Welch (field hockey) =

Australian field hockey player (born 1997)

Personal information
- Born: 26 October 1997 (age 28) Hobart, Tasmania, Australia

Sport
- Sport: Field hockey
- Position: Forward
- Club: Fremantle Cockburn Hockey Club
Senior career
Years	Team	Caps	Goals
2015–	Tassie Tigers	25	5
National team
Years	Team	Caps	Goals
2015–2016	Australia U–21	15	(4)
2018–	Australia	8	(2)
Medal record
Men's field hockey
Representing Australia
Oceania Cup
Gold medal – first place	2023 Whangārei
Gold medal – first place	2025 Darwin

Jack Welch (born 26 October 1997) is an Australian field hockey player, who plays as a forward.

== Personal life ==
Jack Welch was born and raised in Hobart, Tasmania.

== Career ==
=== Domestic leagues ===
==== Australian Hockey League ====
Jack Welch made his debut for the Tassie Tigers in 2015, at the Australian Hockey League (AHL) in Darwin. Throughout his four-season AHL career, Welch won two bronze medals with the Tigers, his first in 2015, and his second during the final edition of the tournament in 2018.

==== Hockey One ====
After the introduction of Hockey Australia's new domestic league, Hockey One, in 2019, Welch was named to the rebranded Tassie Tigers team for the competition's inaugural edition.

=== National teams ===
==== Under–21 ====
Welch first appeared for the Australia U–21 side in 2015, at the Sultan of Johor Cup in Johor Bahru.

Following his 2015 debut, Welch represented the team again in 2016, at the Sultan of Johor Cup and the Junior World Cup. At the tournaments, Australia finished first and fourth respectively.

==== Kookaburras ====
In 2018, Jack Welch was a member of the Australian Development Squad. Despite this, he was called up and made his senior international debut during a test match against Argentina in Darwin. He then went on to play in the International Hockey Open days later.

Following his 2018 debut, Welch was named to the Kookaburras squad for the 2019 calendar year. During 2019, he has only appeared in the FIH Pro League.
