= Hayden Beltz =

Australian field hockey player

Personal information
- Born: 8 September 1997 (age 28) Hobart, Tasmania

Sport
- Sport: Field hockey
- Position: Midfielder
Senior career
Years	Team	Caps	Goals
2015–2018	Tassie Tigers ^{(AHL)}	24	2
2019–	Tassie Tigers	1	1
National team
Years	Team	Caps	Goals
2015–2018	Australia U–21	12	(2)
Medal record
Men's field hockey
Representing Australia
Oceania Cup
Gold medal – first place	2025 Darwin
Sultan of Johor Cup
Bronze medal – third place	2018 Johor Bahru	Team

Hayden Beltz (born 8 September 1997) is a field hockey player from Australia.

== Personal life ==
Hayden Beltz was born and raised in Hobart, Tasmania.

He has an older brother, Joshua, who is a member of the Australian senior national team.

== Career ==
=== Club hockey ===
In 2018, Beltz was signed to play for Surbiton in the England Hockey League for the 2018–2019 season. During his time at Surbiton, Beltz also represented the team during the 2018–2019 EHL.

=== Domestic leagues ===
==== Australian Hockey League ====
Hayden Beltz made his Australian Hockey League (AHL) debut in 2015 representing his home state Tasmania as a member of the Tassie Tigers. During his four–season career with the Tigers, Beltz won bronze at two tournaments, in 2015 and during the final edition of the tournament in 2018.

==== Hockey One ====
After the overhaul of the AHL and introduction of the Hockey One, Beltz was named in a rebranded Tassie Tigers team for the inaugural edition of the competition.

=== National programs ===
==== Under–21 ====
Beltz was a member of the Australia U–21 side, the 'Burras', from 2015 to 2018. During this time, he represented the team at two Sultan of Johor Cup's in 2015 and 2018, winning a bronze medal at the latter.

==== National development squad ====
In 2019, Beltz was named in the Australian development squad for the first time.
