= Jeremy Edwards (field hockey) =

Australian field hockey player

Personal information
- Full name: Jeremy David Edwards
- Born: 23 December 1991 (age 34) Canberra, ACT, Australia
- Height: 176 cm (5 ft 9 in)
- Weight: 78 kg (172 lb)

Sport
- Sport: Field hockey
- Position: Defence
- Club: Tassie Tigers
National team
| Years | Team | Caps | Goals |
| 2013– | Australia | 62 | (2) |
Medal record
Men's field hockey
Representing Australia
Commonwealth Games
| Gold medal – first place | 2018 Gold Coast | Team |
Hockey World League
| Gold medal – first place | 2016-17 Bhubaneswar | Team |
Hockey Champions Trophy
| Gold medal – first place | 2018 Breda | Team |

Jeremy Edwards (born 23 December 1991) is an Australian field hockey player.

Edwards was born in Canberra, ACT, and made his senior international debut in a 2013 test series against Korea, in Perth, Western Australia.

In 2017, Edwards was elevated into the senior national team from the development squad, and has been a regular team member since.

In March 2018, Edwards was selected in the Australian national squad for the 2018 Commonwealth Games. The team won the gold medal, defeating New Zealand 2–0 in the final.

Edwards has also been involved in several comedy projects. In 2007 he was part of the sketch comedy group Klarence Komedy, who released a sketch comedy CD titled "Komedy That Lasts". The group were threatened with defamation of character after the release of the album but the matter was eventually settled out of court. In 2015 they released their second album "The Reunion".

Edwards also had a promising Indoor Cricket career. His most well-known moment was the infamous final over vs Marlo Bros in the 2020 Oakleigh Indoor semi-final. With Marlo Bros requiring 14 off 1 delivery, victory seemed all but assured, however the pressure seemingly got to Jeremy as he delivered a front foot no ball resulting in 7 runs. In typical Edwards fashion, he was able to gather himself and responded with a delivery to send Luke's Legends through to the grand final. However, the 2020 Covid pandemic saw the grand final cancelled, never to be rescheduled. Riding a 12 game win streak and with Edwards at the helm, a dynasty loomed for Luke's Legends but was over before it even began.
