= Joshua Beltz =

Australian field hockey player

Personal information
- Born: 24 April 1995 (age 31) Hobart, Tasmania, Australia

Sport
- Sport: Field hockey
- Position: Defender
- Club: Ranchi Royals
National team
Years	Team	Caps	Goals
2016	Australia U21	9	(1)
2015–	Australia	46	(3)
Medal record
Men's field hockey
Representing Australia
Olympic Games
Silver medal – second place	2020 Tokyo	Team
Champions Trophy
Gold medal – first place	2016 London
Commonwealth Games
Gold medal – first place	2022 Birmingham	Team
Oceania Cup
Gold medal – first place	2015 Stratford
Gold medal – first place	2017 Sydney
Gold medal – first place	2023 Whangārei
Gold medal – first place	2025 Darwin

Joshua Beltz (born 24 April 1995) is an Australian field hockey player who plays as a defender for the Australia national team.

Beltz is an Olympic silver medallist and a Commonwealth gold medallist.

== Personal life ==
Beltz was born on 24 April 1995 in Hobart, Tasmania, Australia and he grew up in the city.

Beltz also has a younger brother, Hayden, who previously represented Australia's under-21 side, the Burras.

== Career ==
=== Junior ===
Beltz was first named in the Burras squad in 2016. That year he played in the 2016 Junior Oceania Cup in Gold Coast, Queensland, Australia and a qualifier for the 2016 Men's Hockey Junior World Cup.

After gaining qualification for the Junior World Cup, Beltz was also an inclusion in that team, where Australia lost 3–0 to Germany in the Bronze Medal Match to finish fourth overall.

=== Senior ===
Beltz made his international debut for the Australia national team, the Kookaburras, in 2015, in a test match against India.

Since his debut, Beltz has been a regular inclusion in the Kookaburras squad, most notably winning a gold medal at the 2016 Men's Hockey Champions Trophy in London, England, United Kingdom.

In November 2018, Beltz was named in the Kookaburras squad for the 2019 calendar year.

In 2022, Beltz helped Australia to gold at the 2022 Commonwealth Games in Birmingham, England, United Kingdom, defeating India 7–0 in the final.

Beltz was selected in the Kookaburras squad for the delayed 2020 Summer Olympics in Tokyo, Japan. In the group stage, Beltz scored in Australia's 7–1 win against India. The team reached the final for the first time since 2004 but couldn't achieve gold as they were beaten by Belgium in a shootout.
