= List of Zambian musicians =

This is a list of Zambian musicians, producers, and musical groups.

== Solo musicians ==
- Alick Nkhata
- B Flow
- Ballad Zulu
- Chef 187
- Emeli Sandé
- Rikki Ililonga
- Jordan Katembula
- Maureen Lilanda
- Just Slim
- Larry Maluma
- Lazarus Tembo
- Lily Tembo
- Macky 2
- Maiko Zulu
- Mampi
- Yvonne Mwale
- Matthew Ngosa
- Nashil Pichen
- OC Osilliation
- Paul Ngozi
- Roberto
- Sampa the Great
- Petersen Zagaze
- Yo Maps

== Groups ==
- Amanaz
- Amayenge
- Mashome Blue Jeans
- The Peace
- Witch
- Zone Fam
