= 2019 Varsity Sports (South Africa) =

2019 Varsity Sport
Tournament information
- Sport: Athletics; Association football Basketball; Cricket; Field Hockey; Mountain bike Netball; Rugby sevens
- Date: 2019
- Administrator: Varsity Sports

The 2019 Varsity Sport, the 10 season of a South African university.

== Basketball ==
4-6 and 10–12 October, Wits Multi-purpose Sports Hall, University of the Witwatersrand. Varsity Women's Basketball makes its debut.

=== Women ===
VUT 58(1) - 58(0) NWU, first six shootout efforts, VUT is win

=== Men ===
UJ 64 - Tuks 57

== Cricket ==
Tuks final against UJ at Senwes Park, Potchefstroom

=== Knockout stage ===
Semi-finals
6 September - Senwes Park
Tuks	129/5
Maties	125/7
6 September – Senwes Park
UJ	204/4
NWU	166/8

Final
7 September – Senwes Park
UJ	55/7
Tuks	60/2

=== Awards ===
- MTN Pulse Best Bowler of the Tournament: Sean Gilson (UP-Tuks)
- Best batsman of the tournament: Lourén Steenkamp (NWU)
- FNB Player of the tournament: Neil Brand (UP-Tuks)

== Football ==
=== Men ===
NWU (beat TUT 1–0)

=== Women ===
TUT (beat UWC 4–1 in shootout after 1-1 full-time)

== Hockey ==
First legs: UCT Hockey, University of Cape Town, Rondebosch
Two legs: NWU Astro, North-West University, Potchefstroom

Pos	Team	Pld	W	OTW	OTL	L	GF	GA	GD	Pts	Qualification
1	Maties	7	5	0	1	1	27	6	+21	16	Semi-Final
2	NWU (H)	7	5	0	0	2	21	11	+10	15	Semi-Final
3	Kovsie	7	4	1	0	2	40	20	+20	14	Semi-Final
4	Tuks	7	4	0	0	3	27	16	+11	12	Semi-Final
5	UJ (E)	7	3	1	1	2	12	16	−4	12	
6	Ikeys	7	3	0	1	3	19	21	−2	10	
7	WITS	7	1	1	0	5	12	24	−12	5	
8	Madibaz	7	0	0	0	7	9	54	−45	0	

Source: SA Hockey
(E) Eliminated; (H) Host

=== Knockout stage ===
Semi-finals
13 May - NWU Astro
Maties	7
Tuks	5
13 May – NWU Astro
Kovsie	4
NWU	5

Final
20 May – NWU Astro
Maties	0(1)
NWU	0(2)

=== Final standings ===
Pos	Team
1	NWU (H)
2	Maties
3	Kovsie
4	Tuks
5	Ikeys
6	UJ
7	WITS
8	Madibaz

Source: SA Hockey
(H) Host

=== Awards ===
The following awards were given at the conclusion of the tournament.

Player of the tournament	Goalkeeper of the tournament	Top goalscorer
Onthatile Zulu (Tuks)		Simoné Gouws (Kovsie)

== Mountain bike ==
FNB Wines2Whales Pinotage, Oak Valley Estate in Elgin, 28–30 October 2019, the three-day stage race. Teams from Stellenbosch University (Maties), the University of Cape Town (UCT), North-West University (NWU), University of Pretoria (Tuks), Nelson Mandela University (Madibaz) and the Tshwane University of Technology (TUT), will be invited to compete. Each of the six universities will be invited to send two teams; either men's, women's or one of each.

=== Men ===
Men MTB
	Team	Users	Stage 1	Stage 2	Stage 3	Final standings
1	UCT	Richard Simpson; Michael Lambrecht	02:49.38,0	02:54.54,7	02:53.11,6	08:37.45,0
2	Tuks	Andries Nigrini; Antonie Joubert	02:49.03,0	03:01.00,0	02:55.17,6	08:45.21,0
3	Maties	Michael Sutton; Morné Hollander	03:12.16,0	03:24.06,8	03:14.37,0	09:51.00,1
4	Madibaz	Jan Venter; Munro Munnik	03:36.51,0	03:25.22,6	03:19.29,9	10:21.44,0
5	NWU	Brendan van Eeden; Christo Botes	03:17.37,0	03:43.04,6	03:22.42,4	10:23.24,9
6	TUT	Vian Pretorius; Shaun-Cameron Swanepoel	04:08.56,0	03:58.51,9	03:51.18,2	11:59.06,0

=== Women ===
Caption
	Team	User	Stage 1	Stage 2	Stage 3	Final standings
1	UCT	Courteney Webb; Amy Tait	03:41.10	03:45.31,1	03:31.08,4	10:57.54,0
2	Maties	Catherine Pellow-Jarmain; Susan Kruger	03:52.42	03:51.11,0	03:37.15,6	11:21.08,0
3	Madibaz	Jean-Marie Roelofse; Stacey Hyslop	04:08.32	04:09.56,0	03:35.51,0	11:54.19,3
4	Tuks	Tanya Kotze; Michelle Benson	04:03.26	04:04.14,5	03:50.26,1	11:58.07,4
5	NWU	Nicolene Marais; Ané Jacobs	05:06.33	04:31.23,5	04:08.06,4	13:46.03,0

== Netball ==
UP-Tuks are the Varsity Netball champions, and became the first team to do so unbeaten throughout, after beating Maties 48–43 on 7 October 2019, Rembrandt Hall, University of Pretoria.

== 7s Rugby ==
4-5 October 2019, Pirates Rugby Club, Greenside, Johannesburg

=== Women ===
The inaugural Varsity Women's 7s The teams competing are; UP-Tuks (University of Pretoria), UJ (University of Johannesburg), UKZN (University of KwaZulu-Natal) and UFH (University of Fort Hare). Tuks possibly played one of their best games of the season when they beat UFH in the final 46-0

=== Men ===
==== Quarter-finals ====
Quarter-finals
5 October 9:11
Kovsies	14
Madibaz	17
5 October 9:33
UJ	37
CPUT	7
5 October 9:55
UWC	17
UP-Tuks	41
5 October 10:17
NWU	14
Maties	31

Semi-finals
12:07
Madibaz	12
UJ	26
12:29
UP-Tuks	5
Maties	24

Final
16:09
UJ	20
Maties	0
Third place
15:03
Madibaz	5
UP-Tuks	36

==== Bowl Semi-Finals Fixtures ====
Semi-finals
5 October 12:51
Kovsies	21
CPUT	24
5 October 13:13
UWC	24
NWU	33

Bowl Final (5th/6th Place)
14:41
CPUT	19
MWU	34
7th/8th Place
14:19
Kovsies	5
UWC	40

== See also ==
- Varsity Sports (South Africa)
- 2019 Varsity Cup
