= Dambisa (singer) =

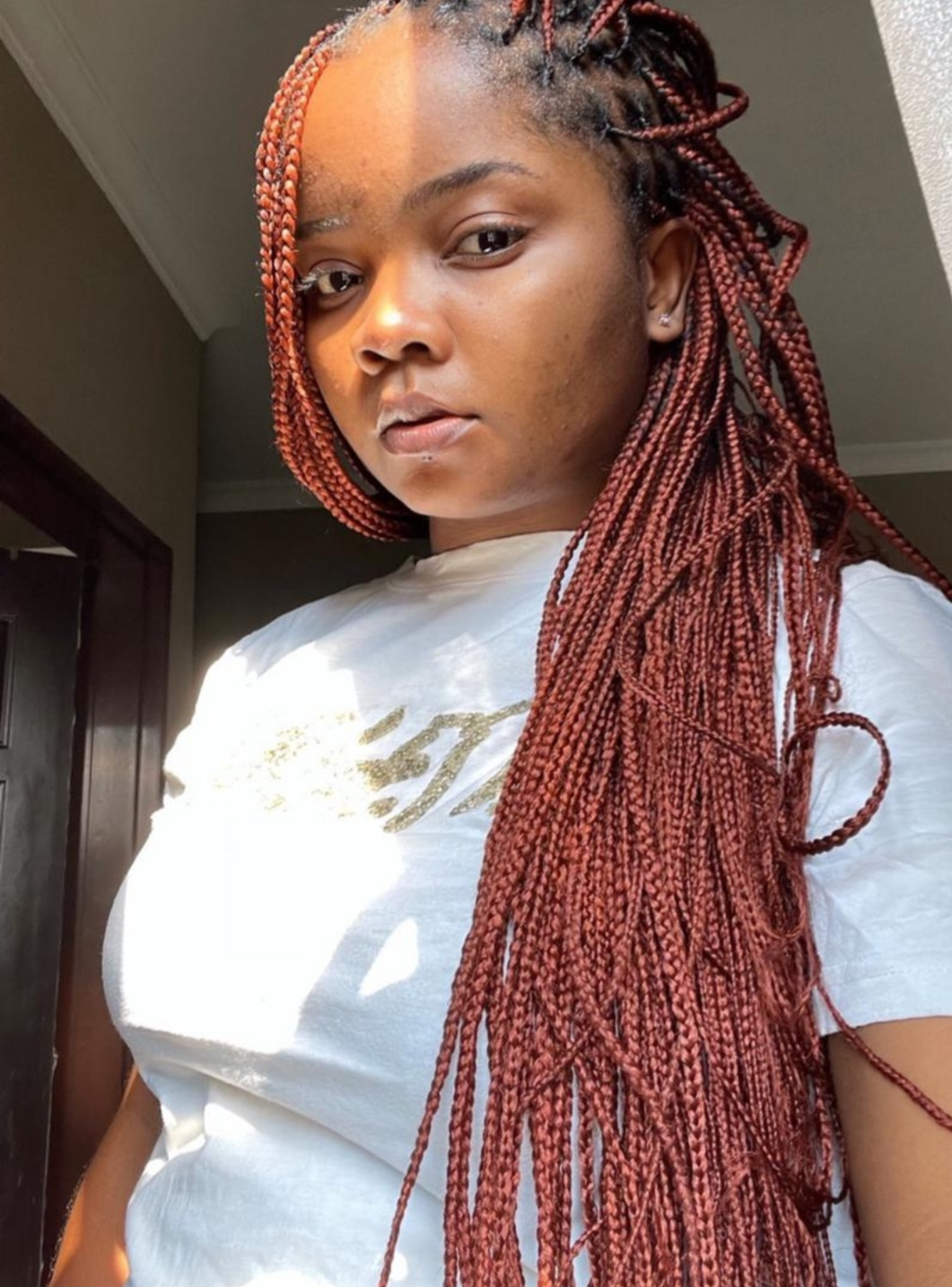
- Dambisa in 2019
- Born: Dambisa Lunda; 10 September 1989 (age 35)
- Occupation: Singer-songwriter
- Musical career
- Genres: Afro pop; Ragga; Dancehall; Kalindula; RnB
- Instrument: Vocals
- Years active: 2010–present
- Labels: Team No Stress

Dambisa Michelle Lunda (born 10 September 1989), better known as just Dambisa, is a Zambian singer-songwriter and a self-proclaimed queen of Dancehall. She is also the brand ambassador for Pampers Zambia. She is best known for having some controversy in some of her songs which have put her in the spot-light. She has also featured on the front cover of EZM (Exclusive Zambian Magazine) in 2014. Dambisa debuted in 2011 with her hit single "Kaduka Chain", on which she featured Petersen.

== Early life and music career ==
Dambisa started singing at the age of 9 years old. During her teenage days, she would listen to Tina Turner’s songs and at times listened to PK Chishala’s which has now shaped her music career. After this Dambisa gained recognition in East, West and Southern Africa to performing on foreign shows and awards in Namibia. Her single "African Baby" was released in 2018. The song embraced the African culture and skin colour for people.
