= Zulu (surname) =

Zulu is a surname. Notable people with the surname include:

- Alexander Grey Zulu (1924–2020), Zambian retired politician
- Alphaeus Zulu (1905–1987), Anglican bishop and Speaker of the KwaZulu Legislative Assembly
- Ballad Zulu, Zambian singer, multi-instrumentalist, songwriter and economist
- Justin Zulu (born 1989), Zambian footballer
- Mahenge Zulu (1965–2019), Italian boxer
- Maiko Zulu, Zambian musician
- Mary Zulu (2002), South African rugby union
- Nhlanhla Zulu, South African politician and prince of the Zulu royal family
- Onthatile Zulu (born 2000), South Africa field hockey player
- Pentjie Zulu (born 1990), South African soccer player
- Winstone Zulu (1964–2011), Zambian HIV and tuberculosis activist
- Zeblon Zulu, South African politician
