= Angela Nyirenda =

Zambian singer

- Born: Angela Nyirenda; September 1, 1977 (age 49); Chipata, Zambia
- Occupations: Singer, songwriter, performer
- Years active: 2002–present
- Notable work: Malo Abwino
- Spouse: Moses Sakala
- Children: 3
- Musical career
- Genres: Makewana; Kalindula; Zam-Rock
- Instrument: Vocals

Angela Nyirenda (born September 1, 1976) is a Zambian singer, songwriter and performer known for her Makewana and traditional music, which blends rhythms from Zambia's different ethnic traditions. She rose to national prominence with "Malo Abwino", her debut album.

== Early life and career ==
Angela was born in Chipata, in Zambia's Eastern Province. She developed an interest in pursuing a music career at an early age, which inspired her to relocate from Chipata to Lusaka, where she met the Sakala Brothers, whose mentorship helped launch her professional career.

In 2004, Nyirenda released her debut album, Malo Abwino, with Moses Sakala serving as her producer, manager and principal songwriter. The album became a major commercial success, producing several hit songs and leading to a nationwide tour. It also defined her signature style by blending traditional music from various Zambian ethnic groups with original compositions, including the title track, which was written by her mother.

She further established her public image through her distinctive African print dresses, skirts and headwraps. Her later albums—Ngoma (2006), Zambian Girls (2010) and Salary (2015)—built on that foundation and helped revive traditional genres such as Kalindula and Mantyantya, together with their associated dance styles. During her career, she has shared the stage with artists including Miriam Makeba, Tshala Muana and the Sakala Brothers.

== Discography ==
Angela Nyirenda discography
- Studio albums: 4
- Singles: 20
- Music videos: 25

=== Studio albums ===
List of studio albums with selected details
Title	Details
Malo Abwino	Released: 2004; Formats: CD
Ngoma	Released: 2006; Formats: CD
Zambian Girls	Released: 2010; Formats: CD
Salary	Released: 2015; Formats: CD

=== Singles ===
List of singles as lead artist
Title	Year	Album
Malo Abwino	2004	Malo Abwino
Foni Na Nkholoko	2015	Salary
Nabwinga	2015	Salary
Nabwinga	2015	Salary
Achoseko Maganizo	2015	Salary
Mwanalume Wangu	2015	Salary
Zapakisha	2015	Salary
Mwanisebanyisha	2015	Salary
Nsongwalume	2015	Salary
Nsongwe	2015	Salary
Dondolo Sela	2015	Salary
Mend A Heart	2015	Salary
Kabumba	2015	Salary
