= Allan Toniks =

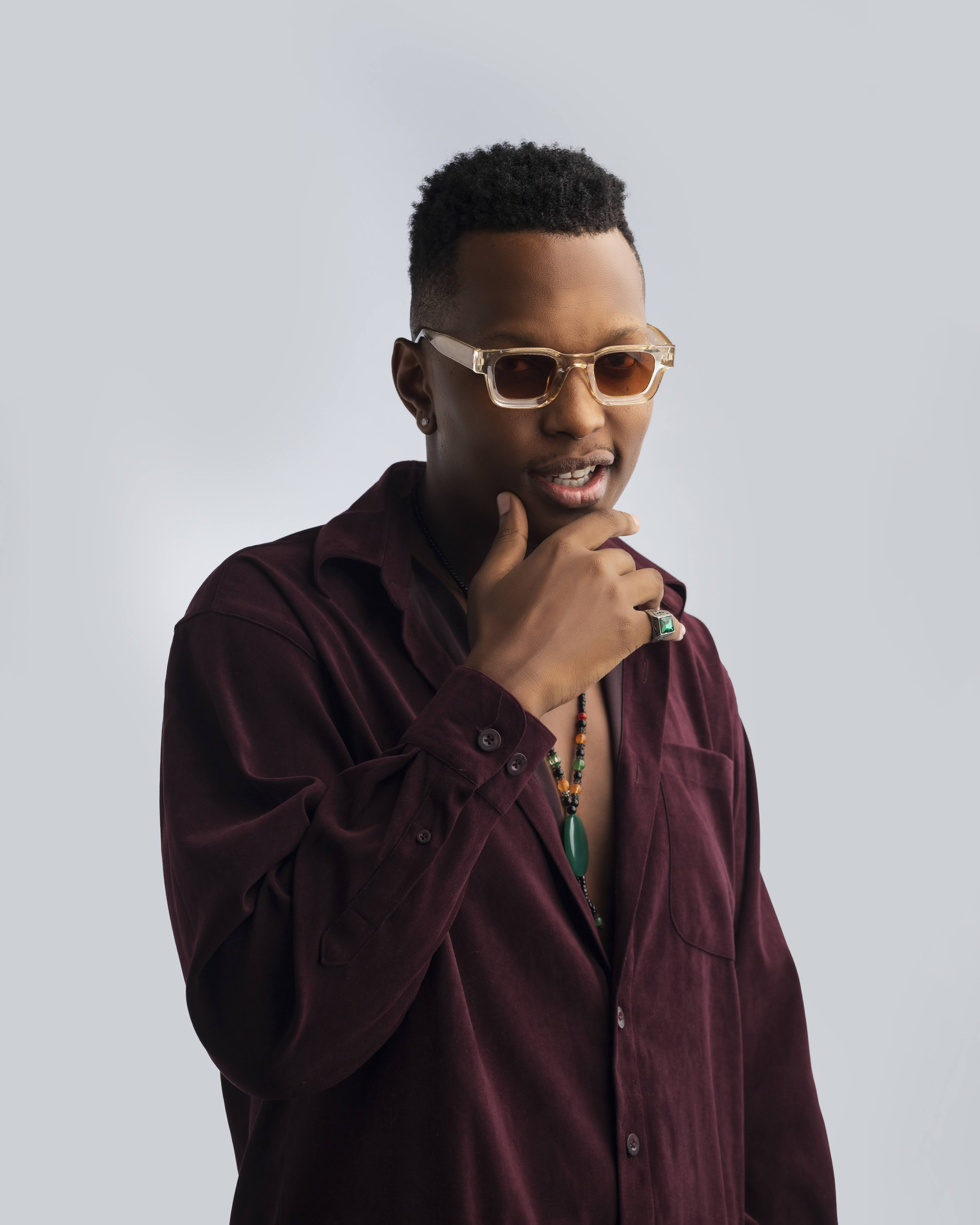
- Born: Mbarara, Uganda
- Education: King's College Budo; Ntare School
- Alma mater: Makerere University Business School
- Occupation: Musician/Producer
- Years active: 2008–present
- Known for: Known for his hit song "Beera nange"
- Style: Afrobeat
- Awards: 2015 Airtel Trace Music Star Competition, the Celebrity Edition.

Allan Toniks, born Allan Ampaire, is a Ugandan singer, songwriter, guitarist and record producer. He has worked and shared stages with several local and international artistes including the Goodlyfe Crew, P Square, General Ozzy (Zambia), Proff (Kenya), Petersen Zagaze (Zambia), Urban Boyz, Gal Level (Namibia), Beenie Man, Genista, (Jamaica) Sean Kingston, Jidenna, Sean Paul, Roberto (Zambia), Stella Mwangi as well as Flavour N'abania of Nigeria. He has also been nominated and won several awards.

He is also a cultural Icon/ambassador for Reach a hand Uganda which is a youth centric organisational program that enhances skills development, sexual reproductive Health and rights and HIV/AIDS awareness and prevention.

== Early life and education ==
Toniks was born in Mbarara and started singing at school where he also learnt how to play the guitars. He went to Mbarara Preparatory School for primary, then joined King's College Budo for O Level and Ntare School for A Level before joining Makerere University Business School where he graduated with a bachelor's degree in International Business Studies in 2011.

== Music ==
Toniks considered a career in music while at University. where he recorded his first single "Beera nange". He is also a guitarist who sometimes produces his own music under his record label Vibrations. Toniks considers his style of music as Afro beat. Toniks participated in, and won the 2015 Airtel Trace Music Star Competition, the Celebrity Edition.

== Discography ==
- Beera Nange
- Mu'ngatto
- That Girl
- Kampala Galz
- Yenze
- Nzewuwo
- Swag meter
- Itaano
- Ningyenda Yoona
- Tukyekole
- Nsubiza
- Regular
- Private Party
- Who You Are
- Sikyetaaga
- Baby Language
- Mulamwa
- Falling
- Romance
- Sunday
- Sikuleka
- Wonder Woman
- Ensonga
- Turn Around
