= Mike Nyoni =

Zambian musician

- Born: Mike Nyoni; Zambia
- Occupation: Singer
- Years active: 1970s – 1980s.

Mike Nyoni was a Zambian musician who rose from the band Born Free which was founded in 1972 by bandleader, drummer, and vocalist Nicky Mwanza, but the band never recorded until a complete personnel change. Star-in-the-making Mike Nyoni joined as vocalist and lead guitarist. The Band is known for the album Mukaziwa Chingoni.

Nyoni's style of music took a step away from the fuzz-rock sounds of Zamrock, opting to add wah-wah guitar pedals and overall funk elements.

He won Zambia's best solo artist in 1984 Zambia Daily Mail polls.

== Discography ==
=== Studio albums ===
- My Own Thing
- Kawalala
- I Can't Understand You

=== Selected singles ===
- "Bo Ndate Sianga"
- "Infintu Ni Bwangu"
- "Fungo Lanjala"
- "Niyenda Kumudzi"

== See also ==
- Music of Zambia
