= Sogolo =

Studio album by Witch
- Released: 13 June 2025
- Recorded: 2024
- Genre: Zamrock
- Length: 39:39
- Label: Desert Daze Sound

Witch chronology
Zango (2023)	Sogolo (2025)

Singles from Sogolo
- 1. "Queenless King" Released: 19 March 2025; 2. "Nadi" Released: 29 April 2025; 3. "Kamusale" Released: 10 June 2025

Sogolo (transl. future) is a studio album by Zambian band Witch. It was released on 13 June 2025 through Desert Daze Sound and was supported by the singles "Queenless King", "Nadi", and "Kamusale". Primarily a zamrock album, it follows the band's 2023 album Zango. It received widespread acclaim from critics.

== Background and release ==
Witch formed in Zambia in the 1970s. After a number of album releases, the band were considered pioneers of the Zamrock scene and were known as the Zambian Beatles. The group disbanded during the 1980s after all of the band's members, other than Emanuel "Jagari" Chanda, died due to AIDS. Reissues of their music in the 2010s sparked a resurgence in interest in the band; singer Jagari and keyboardist Patrick Mwondela reformed the band in 2017. They recruited younger artists Jacco Gardner, Charlie Garmendia, Stefan Lilov, Nicola Mauskovic, Theresa Ng'ambi, and Hanna Tembo for the band. The band released the album Zango in 2023, the band's first album in nearly 30 years.

The album was primarily recorded in Berlin, Germany during a 10-day break in the band's 2024 Zango Tour. The band announced the album and released its lead single, "Queenless King" on 19 March 2025. The band toured in Europe, North America, and Australia in support of the album in 2025.

== Composition ==
Album opener "Kamusale" is a rock song with a "thunderous guitar riff and undulating talking drum". The song draws inspiration from a Bemba children's game song. "Nadi" is a punk and garage rock song with pitch-shifted vocals and psych riffs. Jagari's vocals are "playfully AutoTuned" as he sings in the Bemba language. "Queenless King" is a funk song with a spacey synth solo. The song's lyrics see Jagari warning young people against marrying a bad hearted person. "Tiponde Madzi" is an afrobeat song with an "impassioned vocal and relentless percussion". In "Bang Bang", Jagari calls on listeners to shake their bodies and join him in the mosh pit. "Set Free" is a torch song with vocals from Theresa Ng'ambi and an afrobeat instrumental. "Mbangula Sesa" is a traditional folk song. "(In Memory Of) John" is a desert rock song. "Dancer on a Trip" is a "funky, spiraling track" with squiggly synths and jabbing guitars. "Nibani" has influences of contemporary afro rock and pop music. "Totally Devoted" features elements of reggae, gospel, and psychedelic rock music. Album closer "Machiriso" has a "repetitive laid back groove".

== Critical reception ==
Professional ratings
Aggregate scores
Source	Rating
Metacritic	82/100
Review scores
Source	Rating
AllMusic	4/5 stars
Clash	7/10
The Guardian	4/5 stars
Mojo	4/5 stars
musicOMH	4/5 stars

According to the review aggregator Metacritic, Sogolo received "universal acclaim" based on a weighted average score of 82 out of 100 from 7 critic scores.

Sam Shepherd's review for musicOMH states that the album is "distinctly forward-thinking", with the band "embracing multiple genres and entirely mastering them." Ammar Kalia of The Guardian wrote that the album's "joyously strange combinations show the Zamrock originators to be just as imaginative now as they ever were." Sam Walker-Smart of Clash wrote that the album was less cohesive but "braver, more energetic, and forward-thinking" than Zango.

== Track listing ==
No.	Title	Length
1.	"Kamusale"	3:51
2.	"Nadi"	3:07
3.	"Queenless King"	3:56
4.	"Tiponde Madzi"	3:26
5.	"Bang Bang"	2:59
6.	"Set Free"	2:53
7.	"Mbangula Sesa"	1:35
8.	"(In Memory Of) John"	2:11
9.	"Dancer on a Trip"	3:57
10.	"Nibani"	2:39
11.	"Totally Devoted"	2:56
12.	"Machiriso"	6:03
Total length:		39:39
