= Zango (album) =

Studio album by Witch
- Released: 2 June 2023
- Studio: DB Studios (Lusaka, Zambia)
- Genre: Zamrock
- Length: 42:26
- Labels: Desert Daze Sound, Partisan Records
- Producers: Jacco Gardner; Michael Linyama

Witch chronology
Kuomboka (1984)	Zango (2023)	Sogolo (2025)

Singles from Zango
- 1. "Waile" Released: 27 January 2023; 2. "Message from Witch" Released: 23 March 2023; 3. "Avalanche of Love" Released: 4 April 2023; 4. "Unimvwesha Shuga" Released: 3 May 2023; 5. "Nshingilile" Released: 31 May 2023

Zango (transl. meeting place) is the eighth studio album by Zambian band Witch. It was released on 2 June 2023 on Desert Daze Sound in partnership with Partisan Records, nearly 40 years after Witch's previous studio album, 1984's Kuomboka. It is also the band's first album since 1976 to feature frontman and co-founder Emmanuel "Jagari" Chanda.

== Background and release ==
After disbanding in 1985, Witch reunited in 2012, with bandleader Emmanuel "Jagari" Chanda and keyboardist Patrick Mwondela newly joined by European musicians Jacco Gardner, Nico Mauskoviç, Stefan Lilov, and JJ Whitefield. The band's revival was sparked in part by a renewed interest in Zamrock in the United States and Europe, especially among crate diggers, leading to the reissue of Witch's discography in 2012, their subsequent world tour, and the release of the documentary We Intend to Cause Havoc about the band in 2019.

The album's title Zango literally translates to "meeting place"; as the band explained, "Every village [in Zambia] will have this central place, where villagers meet to prepare for work, where youngsters go to learn, where the young ones learn from the elder folks, and where the visitors come and converge."

The album's track "Avalanche of Love" features Zambian rapper Sampa the Great, who said she was drawn "to the defiance and the edginess" of Witch's music and had previously collaborated with Witch on her 2022 album As Above, So Below.

== Critical reception ==
Professional ratings
Aggregate scores
Source	Rating
Metacritic	84/100
Review scores
Source	Rating
Exclaim!	8/10
Loud and Quiet	8/10
Mojo	4/5 stars
Pitchfork	7.7/10
The Quietus	4/5 stars
Uncut	8/10

Zango was released to critical acclaim. At Metacritic, the album received an aggregate score of 84 based on 4 reviews, indicating "universal acclaim".

Writing for Pitchfork, Brad Sanders praised the album for evolving Witch's sound while also adhering to their classic Zamrock roots, writing: "Zango is rooted in classic Zamrock, and it builds on the inherent malleability of the genre's sound. The band slinks seamlessly between passages of Fela Kuti-style Afrobeat, spacey psych-pop, and stomping, Sabbathian proto-metal." In a four-star review for Mojo, David Hutcheon complimented the band's "rough edges" on the album, writing that "with two veteran members and four younger, European additions, they are even more noisily rebellious now than they were in the 1970s." Jack Doherty of Loud and Quiet called the album "a far groovier monster than anything from their extensive back catalogue," noting its funk and psychedelic rock influences.

== Track listing ==
No.	Title	Length
1.	"By the Time You Realize"	4:36
2.	"Waile"	5:15
3.	"Nshingilile" (featuring Keith Kabwe of Amanaz)	3:04
4.	"Streets of Lusaka"	4:45
5.	"Unimvwesha Shuga" (featuring Theresa Ng'ambi and Hanna Tembo)	3:42
6.	"Avalanche of Love" (featuring Sampa the Great)	3:55
7.	"Malango" (featuring Theresa Ng'ambi and Hanna Tembo)	5:42
8.	"Stop the Rot"	4:22
9.	"These Eyes of Mine"	4:01
10.	"Message from Witch"	3:00
Total length:		42:26

== Personnel ==
Adapted from Bandcamp.

Musicians

- Emmanuel "Jagari" Chanda – vocals
- Patrick Mwondela – keyboard, synthesizer
- Jacco Gardner – bass guitar, synthesizer
- Nico Mauskoviç – drums, percussion
- JJ Whitefield – guitar
- Stefan Lilov – guitar

Guest musicians

- Keith Kabwe (of Amanaz)
- Sampa the Great
- Theresa Ng'ambi
- Hanna Tembo
- Jones Kabanga
- K. Flint Mabuluki
