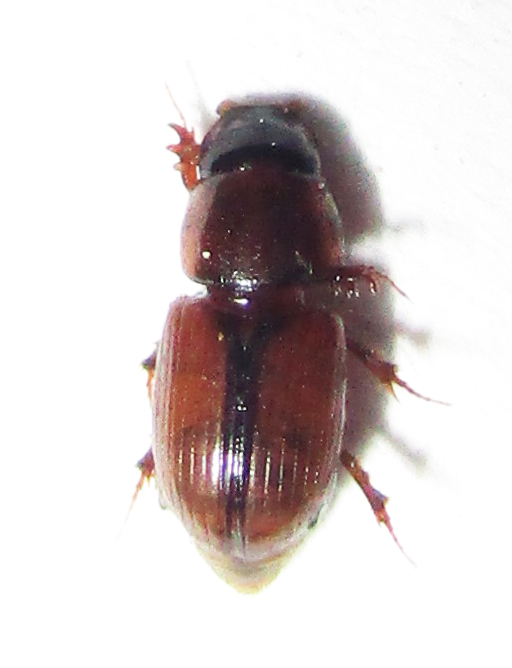
- Mesontoplatys, Botswana

Scientific classification
- Kingdom: Animalia
- Phylum: Arthropoda
- Clade: Pancrustacea
- Class: Insecta
- Order: Coleoptera
- Suborder: Polyphaga
- Infraorder: Scarabaeiformia
- Family: Scarabaeidae
- Subfamily: Aphodiinae
- Tribe: Aphodiini
- Subtribe: Aphodiina
- Genus: Mesontoplatys; Motschulsky, 1863

= Mesontoplatys =

Genus of beetles

Mesontoplatys is a genus of dung beetles in the family Scarabaeidae. There are more than 20 described species in Mesontoplatys, found in Europe, Africa, and Asia.

== Species ==
These 27 species belong to the genus Mesontoplatys:

- Mesontoplatys arabicus (Harold, 1875) (Palaearctic, Afrotropics)
- Mesontoplatys bolzi (Petrovitz, 1967) (Afrotropics)
- Mesontoplatys dorsalis (Klug, 1855) (Africa, Asia, Europe)
- Mesontoplatys durandi (Petrovitz, 1973) (Senegal)
- Mesontoplatys effetus (Kolbe, 1908) (Afrotropics)
- Mesontoplatys indorsalis (Endrödi, 1960) (Afrotropics)
- Mesontoplatys malzyi (Paulian, 1939) (Mauretania, Niger)
- Mesontoplatys maoensis (Endrödi, 1964) (Chad)
- Mesontoplatys marlieri (Endrödi, 1960) (Afrotropics)
- Mesontoplatys mbaoensis (Petrovitz, 1969) (Senegal)
- Mesontoplatys mungo (Balthasar, 1946) (South Asia)
- Mesontoplatys offensus (Petrovitz, 1967) (Tanzania)
- Mesontoplatys ovamboensis (Petrovitz, 1962) (South Africa)
- Mesontoplatys parvulus (Harold, 1871) (Africa, Asia, Europe)
- Mesontoplatys politipennis (Müller, 1941) (Afrotropics)
- Mesontoplatys probes (Péringuey, 1901) (Afrotropics)
- Mesontoplatys remedellii (Müller, 1941) (Afrotropics)
- Mesontoplatys rougoni (Petrovitz, 1974) (Afrotropics)
- Mesontoplatys rubrus (Bordat, 1992) (Kenya)
- Mesontoplatys rufolaterus Motschulsky, 1863 (South Asia, Afrotropics)
- Mesontoplatys scutatus (Petrovitz, 1961) (India)
- Mesontoplatys simplicipennis (Petrovitz, 1972) (Afrotropics)
- Mesontoplatys simplicius (Petrovitz, 1974) (Afrotropics)
- Mesontoplatys sunantae (Stebnicka, 1982) (Thailand)
- Mesontoplatys triangularis (Schmidt, 1907) (South Africa)
- Mesontoplatys zavadili (Balthasar, 1941) (Namibia)
- Mesontoplatys zulu (Petrovitz, 1962) (Zululand)
