= Zulu =

Zulu may refer to:

== Zulu people ==
- Zulu Kingdom or Zulu Empire, a former monarchy in what is now South Africa
- Zulu language, a Bantu language spoken in southern Africa
- Zulu people, an ethnic group of southern Africa
- Zulu traditional religion, Bantu religion from southern Africa

== Arts, entertainment, and media ==
=== Films ===
- Zulu (1964 film), a war film starring Stanley Baker and Michael Caine
- Zulu (2013 film), a French crime film starring Forest Whitaker and Orlando Bloom

=== Music ===
- "Zulu" (song), a 1981 dance single by British funk duo the Quick
- Zulu Records, a record store in Vancouver, British Columbia, Canada founded in 1981
- "Zulu", a song by Blink-182 from the 1996 EP They Came to Conquer... Uranus
- Zulu (band), an American hardcore punk band formed in 2019

=== Other uses in arts, entertainment, and media ===
- Zulu (Pillow Pal), a Pillow Pal zebra made by Ty, Inc.
- TV 2 Zulu, a Danish television station
- Zulu Social Aid & Pleasure Club, a Carnival krewe in New Orleans

== People ==
- Zulu (surname), a surname (including a list of people with the name)
- Zulu (footballer), full name Carlos Eduardo Alves Albina (born 1983), Brazilian forward
- Gilbert Lani Kauhi (1937–2004), stage name Zulu, who played Kono in the original Hawaii Five-O series
- Zulu kaMalandela, founder (c. 1709) and chief of the Zulu clan
- Zulu Sofola (1935–1995), professor and the first published female Nigerian playwright and dramatist
- Shaka Zulu (c. 1787 – 1828), leader of the Zulu Kingdom

== Places ==
- Zulu, Indiana, a town in the United States
- 1922 Zulu, an asteroid
- KwaZulu-Natal, a province in South Africa

== Military ==
- Battle Force Zulu, U.S. Navy carrier task force designation (including a list of them)
- HMS Zulu, three ships of the British Royal Navy
- Task Force Zulu, a South African Defence Force unit in Operation Savannah
- Zulu-class submarine, a Soviet attack submarine class built in the 1950s

== Science and technology ==
- Zulü, an approximation of pi
- Zulu, a variant of the 1910s Sunbeam Crusader motorcycle engine
- Alaena, a genus of butterflies in the family Lycaenidae commonly called zulus
- Azul Zulu, a binary build of OpenJDK (a Java implementation) developed by Azul Systems
- Torbenia, a genus of butterflies in the family Lycaenidae commonly called zulus
- Zulu sheep, a breed raised primarily by the Zulu people in Southern Africa
- Zulu time, more commonly known as UTC, for the Z in TZ timestamps

== Other uses ==
- Z, pronounced "Zulu" in the NATO phonetic alphabet
- Zulu, a type of boat used in the Scottish east coast fishery
- Zulu Wikipedia, Zulu language edition of Wikipedia
- The Zulus, a former football team in Sheffield, England
- The Birmingham Zulu Warriors, a football hooligan "firm" associated with Birmingham City FC

== See also ==
- Amazulu (disambiguation)
- Zululand (disambiguation)
- Sulu (disambiguation)
