= Alick Nkhata =

- Born: Alick Nkhata; February 21, 1922; Lusaka, Northern Rhodesia
- Died: October 19, 1978 (aged 56)
- Occupations: Musician; songwriter; Broadcaster; Freedom Fighter
- Children: Pamela Kangwa Nkhata (d)
- Musical career
- Genres: Kalindula
- Instruments: Banjo; Guitar
- Years active: 1950s-1970s

Alick Nkhata (1922–1978) was a Zambian musician, freedom fighter and broadcaster from the 1950s to the mid-1970s. He was also the director of the Zambia National Broadcasting Corporation (ZNBC), and formed the Lusaka Radio Band, later called the Big Gold Six Band. The band played Zambian music and scored translations of original rural songs.

== Death ==
On October 19, 1978, Selous Scouts, a special forces unit of the Rhodesian Army, flew into Zambia using helicopters marked “Rhodesia Air Force” at very low altitudes, avoiding Zambian radar.

The main target of the Rhodesian raid was Mkushi camp, where the Zimbabwe People’s Revolutionary Army (ZIPRA) was training its guerrillas. ZIPRA was the armed wing of the Zimbabwe African People’s Union (ZAPU), then waging a bush war against the Rhodesian government of Ian Douglas Smith.

Raids into ZIPRA camps in Zambia were carried out by specialized Rhodesian military units led by the notorious Green Leader, real name Chris Dixon, who openly ordered the Zambian airforce not to interfere with their operations or face similar action. The Zambian base commander communicating with Green Leader agrees to keep his Soviet-supplied MIG Fighter planes on the ground.

In 1974 Alick Nkhata retired to his farm at Mkushi, although he continued to play music occasionally. The farm he bought was among what were called abandoned farmlands which white farmers had left in the hands of the lands board.

A camp of ZIPRA guerrillas had established itself close to Nkhata's farm. On October 19, 1978, Smith’s forces attacked the camp and Nkhata was killed in the crossfire.

== Tributes ==
Alick Nkhata road, where the ZNBC complex and MultiChoice Zambia Head Office is located, was named after Nkhata.

== See also ==
- Music of Zambia
