= 2026 Women's FIH Hockey World Cup bidding process =

The 2026 Women's FIH Hockey World Cup bidding process entails the bids for the 2026 Women's FIH Hockey World Cup. The hosting rights were given to Belgium and Netherlands.

== Bids ==
The International Hockey Federation announced on 15 June 2022 that they had received the following four bids for the 2026 World Cup.

=== For women's event ===
- Australia
- South Africa
- Uruguay

=== For men's and women's event ===
- Belgium and Netherlands
- South Africa

== Women's event ==
=== Australia ===
Australia filed interest in hosting the women's event. The shortlisted venues being proposed were Melbourne/Geelong, Perth, Sydney and Brisbane/Gold Coast. This would have been Australia's third time hosting after 1990 and 2002.

=== South Africa ===
South Africa hoped to be the first African hosts with Potchefstroom as the host city. SA Hockey stated that after successfully hosting the 2022 Women's FIH Hockey Junior World Cup, they were keen in hosting the senior event.

"The FIH have today announced the bids for the 2026 World Cup tournaments. South Africa have bid to host either the FIH Women's Hockey World Cup or the FIH Men's Hockey World Cup in Potchefstroom in 2026. South Africa have also bid to host both tournaments at the same time. Following the successful staging of the FIH Women's Junior World Cup in Potchefstroom this year, the first African-based World Cup, the country and North West University are keen to host the main event."

— Statement from SA Hockey.

South Africa have never hosted the FIH World Cup, but has hosted the 2022 Women's FIH Hockey Junior World Cup and the Men's FIH Hockey Nations Cup in 2022 and 2025–26. South Africa have also hosted numerous African championships.

2026 Women's FIH Hockey World Cup bidding process is located in South Africa	Potchefstroom
2026 Women's FIH Hockey World Cup bidding process is located in South Africa	NWU Astro
2026 Women's FIH Hockey World Cup bidding process is located in South Africa	Capacity: Unknown

=== Uruguay ===
Uruguay was hoping to become hosts for the first time and bring the World Cup back to South America for the first time since 2010. The La Cancha Celeste, which was inaugurated in 2022, was the proposed venue. Despite not winning the hosting rights, Juan Luis Espasandín, president of the Uruguayan Field Hockey Federation, stated that the FIH was very impressed with their bid and led to the Uruguayans being awarded the 2025 Women's Pan American Cup.

2026 Women's FIH Hockey World Cup bidding process is located in Uruguay	Montevideo
2026 Women's FIH Hockey World Cup bidding process is located in Uruguay	La Cancha Celeste
2026 Women's FIH Hockey World Cup bidding process is located in Uruguay	Capacity: Unknown

== Men's and women's event ==
=== Belgium and Netherlands ===
Belgium and Netherlands wants to host both World Cups in 2026, with Wavre, Belgium and Amstelveen, Netherlands being the host cities. Serge Pilet, president of the Royal Belgian Hockey Association, says that with hosting both World Cups, it guarantees that both countries will have a game involving the hosts every day, maximising the amount of tickets that can be sold. He also says that their bid is strong due to the countries' proven track records in hosting field hockey events and the strength of the national teams. In September 2022, a problem came about with the venue in Wavre as contruction had not began yet, with one of the causes being that they were 2 million euros short of the money necessary for the renovation plans. This would be the Netherlands' fifth time hosting after 1986, 1998, 2014, and 2022. This would be Belgium's first time hosting.

(Netherlands) Amstelveen	2026 Women's FIH Hockey World Cup bidding process is located in Benelux	(Belgium) Wavre
Wagener Stadium	2026 Women's FIH Hockey World Cup bidding process is located in Benelux	Belfius Hockey Arena
Capacity: 10,000	2026 Women's FIH Hockey World Cup bidding process is located in Benelux	Capacity: 10,000

=== South Africa ===
Alongside bidding for the women's event separately, South Africa were bidding for both events in Potchefstroom.

2026 Women's FIH Hockey World Cup bidding process is located in South Africa	Potchefstroom
2026 Women's FIH Hockey World Cup bidding process is located in South Africa	NWU Astro
2026 Women's FIH Hockey World Cup bidding process is located in South Africa	Capacity: Unknown

== Hosts announcement ==
Wavre, Belgium and Amstelveen, Netherlands were awarded the hosting rights on 3 November 2022.

"On behalf of FIH, I would like to thank wholeheartedly all National Associations that submitted a bid. We received excellent proposals and it was therefore a particularly challenging task to decide. We’re very much looking forward to working with the National Associations of the current Women's and Men's World and Olympic Champions, the Netherlands and Belgium respectively, that will undoubtedly put together outstanding World Cups!

— FIH CEO, Thierry Weil.
