= EZM =

EZM may refer to:

- Elevated zero maze, variant of the elevated plus maze test for laboratory mice
- Exclusive Zambian Magazine, publication which featured Dambisa in 2014
- EZM, producer of songs in Hummingbird
- EZM, series of watches from Sinn
- European zooming model, wind-flow simulation model consisting of the MEMO model and MARS model
- EZM, FAA LID code for the Heart of Georgia Regional Airport
- End Zone Militia, a group of military reenactors at New England sports games
