= Pilato (rapper) =

PilAto
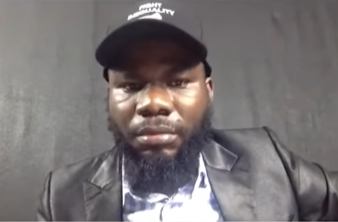
- Speaking at the 2021 World Economic Forum
- Born: Fumba Chama; 6 April 1984 (age 42); Ndola, Zambia
- Other name: pilAto
- Occupations: Musician; Songwriter; Poet
- Musical career
- Genres: Hip hop; Kalindula
- Years active: 2009–present
- Labels: Alpha Entertainments; Money Music
- Website: iampilato.com

Fumba Chama (born 6 April 1984), known professionally as Pilato, is a Zambian hip hop recording artist from Ndola. The name Pilato written as pilAto is an acronym for People in Lyrical Arena Taking Over. Born and raised in the Copperbelt province, pilAto commenced his career as a poet at the age of 10, before formally moving into the music industry in 2010, when poetry became his music. Pilato has released three studio albums.

== Musical career ==
pilAto's music is largely broad-spectrum social commentary with generous overtones of contemporary hip hop after starting out as a poet. Pilato is referred to as the "voice of the voiceless", he is known to be a relevant voice in the dispensation of Democracy in Zambia.pilAto has managed to affix art and music on the political picture in Zambia today. In 2010 Pilato won the Ngoma Award as Zambia's Best Poet. He was later nominated for Best Music Video at the Born & Bred Awards in 2011.

=== Music and politics ===
In between the year 2010 and 2011 at the beginning of he's transition to a human rights activist he had released a song satirically referring to some non-performing Zambian MP's as "Mental Patients". In 2013, he recorded a single entitled "Bufi" featuring Petersen, a highly politically charged song that labeled the late President Michael Sata a "Father of Lies". The song got a negative feed back as the supporters of the ruling party were up in arms and he claims he received numerous death threats over the song. In 2015 Pilato showed his support for opposition leader Hakainde Hichilema and put up regular performances at his rally's countrywide. His support for Mr Hichilema failed to clinch him State House; the PF won the election in what was one of the tightest election victories ever recorded since Zambia reverted to plural politics. 6 months later he recorded a song of Nashil Pischen Kazembe's 1970s hit "Aphiri Anabwela" but he changed the lyrics to "Alungu Anbwela". Unapologetic, the musician was bundled up and slapped with charges of conduct likely to breach peace . His case drew widespread media coverage even beyond Zambian borders. Pilato on record was arrested once in his career over his songs that were considered as conduct likely to breach peace.

==== 2013–2015 ====
In 2013 some rumours spread that pilAto was arrested over the song "Bufi". In the song Pilato and Petersen sing about broken promises like cheap fuel, construction of roads and job opportunities for young people. They used words like Boza, Bufi, Ulabeja, Wenye, which all mean the same thing: lies. But all these reports where dismissed by the Lusaka Police Chief Joyce Kasosa that Pilato has been detained over his latest song titled Bufi. The police Chef said the police department have not recorded any such incident and that Pilato is still a free citizen. Pilato also then confirmed saying he had not been to any police station. In June 2015 Pilato was arrested over a song remix of the legendary Nashil Pischen Kazembe's Aphiri Anabwela but featuring Pilato's lyrics which call President Lungu "a drunk," among several other insults. After he got out jail, Pilato said he cannot defame the Head of State with his song and that he was just merely bringing out his message.

== Awards and nominations ==
- 2010 – Award for Zambia's Best Poet – Ngoma Awards.
- 2011 – Nominated For Best Video – Born & Bred Awards.
- 2014 – Award For Best Collaboration – Zambia Music Awards.
- 2014 – Nominated For Most Conscious Song Category – Born & Bred Awards

== Discography ==
=== Albums ===
- The Forsaken Prophecy – 2015
- Just Stupid – 2014
- Judy's – 2012

=== Selected songs ===
- pilAto - Ichashishita
- PilAto – Bwetete
- PilAto – Hello (Kesulenifye) (Adele Cover) – 2015
- PilAto – Ba Peggy
- PilAto – Alungu Anbwela
- PilAto – Bufi (lies)
- PilAto – Mirror (Lil Wayne cover) – 2011
