= 2018 Men's Varsity Hockey (South Africa) =

Tournament details
- Host country: Johannesburg
- City: South Africa
- Dates: 4 May 2018–31 May 2018
- Venue(s): University of the Witwatersrand; University of Pretoria

Tournament statistics
- Matches played: 33
- Goals scored: 272 (8.24 per match)
- Top scorer: Dayne Samboer (Maties) (13 goals)
- Best player: Sinoxolo Mbekeni (NWU)
- Best goalkeeper: Rob McKinley (Maties)

The 2018 Men's Hockey Varsity Hockey will be the 8th edition of the Varsity Hockey, the annual tournament men's field hockey championship of South Africa.

In addition to the Power Play rule seen in previous seasons of Varsity Hockey, whereby each team can select to implement a two-minute period where goals count two and the opposition must bench two players, field goals will now count two.

== Results ==
=== Preliminary round ===
Pos	Team	Pld	W	OTW	OTL	L	GF	GA	GD	Pts	Qualification
1	Maties	7	7	0	0	0	50	23	+27	21	Semi-Final
2	Tuks	7	4	1	0	2	35	19	+16	14	Semi-Final
3	Wits (H)	7	4	0	0	3	42	28	+14	12	Semi-Final
4	NWU	7	4	0	1	2	37	26	+11	13	Semi-Final
5	Ikeys	7	4	0	0	3	21	18	+3	12	
6	UJ	7	3	0	0	4	19	31	−12	9	
7	Kovsie	7	1	0	0	6	16	51	−35	3	
8	Madibaz	7	0	0	0	7	14	38	−24	0	

Source: SA Hockey
(H) Host

=== Fixtures ===
All times are local (UTC+2).

4 May 2018
13:30

UJ	0-5	Tuks
	Report	Forrest 4', 14'; Sherwood 57'

WITS Hockey

4 May 2018
15:15

NWU	10-4	Kovsie
Naude 2'; Mbekeni 10'; Ludick 23'; Cilliers 38'; Jeffery 59', 60'	Report	van Vollenhoven 4', 45'

WITS Hockey

4 May 2018
17:00

Madibaz	4-6	Maties
Fanoe 13'; Hansel 43'	Report	Arendse 12'; Schooling 20'; Saker 29'

WITS Hockey

4 May 2018
18:45

Wits	6-2	Ikeys
Cressy 29'; Futcher 30'; James 33'; Marki 58'	Report	Mckechnie 50'

WITS Hockey

5 May 2018
13:30

Tuks	4-4	NWU
Halle 27'; Forrest 52'	Report	Ludick 56'; Makan 57'
Penalties
(penalty shoot-out scored) Kemp; (penalty shoot-out scored) Davies; (penalty shoot-out scored) Redfern; (penalty shoot-out missed) Sherwood	3-2	(penalty shoot-out scored) Kenny; (penalty shoot-out missed) du Plessis; (penalty shoot-out scored) Mbekeni; (penalty shoot-out missed) Botma; (penalty shoot-out missed) Lamprecht

WITS Hockey

5 May 2018
15:15

UJ	7-0	Kovsie
Halle 15'; February 16'; Lion-Cachet 59'; York 60'	Report

WITS Hockey

5 May 2018
17:00

Ikeys	6-0	Madibaz
Mckechnie 15'; Gildenhuys 31'; Pfaff 60'	Report

WITS Hockey

5 May 2018
18:45

Wits	2-4	Maties
Botes 42'	Report	Arendse 57'; Schooling 59'

WITS Hockey

6 May 2018
12:00

Ikeys	2-6	Maties
Pfaff 23'	Report	Stewart 17'; Samboer 19'; Pike 25'; Arendse 56'

WITS Hockey

6 May 2018
13:45

Madibaz	2-4	Kovsie
Fanoe 45'	Report	Kruger 29'; Weldhagen 55'

WITS Hockey

6 May 2018
17:00

UJ	3-2	NWU
Lion-Cachet 16'; Botes 53'	Report	Botma 2'

WITS Hockey

6 May 2018
18:45

Wits	5-6	Tuks
Kemp 23'; Sherwood 30'; Paulo 58'	Report	Futcher 4'; Modise 52'; Botes 55'

WITS Hockey

7 May 2018
12:00

NWU	5-6	Maties
Botma 8', 21'; Tait 53'	Report	Pike 34'; Schooling 57'; Arendse 60'

WITS Hockey

7 May 2018
13:45

Kovsie	0-5	Ikeys
	Report	Rossouw 18'; Alfeld 21'; Talmage 49'

WITS Hockey

7 May 2018
17:00

Madibaz	1-6	Tuks
Penhall 42'	Report	Paulo 6', 34'; Sherwood 16'; Forrest 24'

WITS Hockey

6 May 2018
18:45

Wits	4-2	UJ
Botes 16', 31'	Report	February 58'

WITS Hockey

11 May 2018
13:30

NWU	8-7	Wits
Botma 11', 13'; Mbekeni 26'; Thessner 40', 60'	Report	James 9', 15', 42'; Botes 32'; Donaldson 41'

Tuks Astro

11 May 2018
15:15

UJ	5-3	Madibaz
February 16'; Halle 44', 58'	Report	Asmah-Andoh 17'; Potgieter 50'

Tuks Astro

11 May 2018
17:00

Maties	8-4	Kovsie
Saker 25'; Samboer 40', 51'; Giger 42'; Tate 52'; Stewart 52'	Report	Smouse 14'; Mbombisa 30'

Tuks Astro

11 May 2018
18:45

Tuks	2-4	Ikeys
Paulo 38'	Report	Talmage 5'; Watters 42'; Cole 50'

Tuks Astro

12 May 2018
13:30

Kovsie	4-11	Wits
Kruger 40' van der Merwe 47'	Report	Abrahams 21', 27', 60'; Cressy 38'; Botes 56'; Futcher 58'

Tuks Astro

12 May 2018
15:15

Ikeys	2-0	UJ
Forrest 57'	Report

Tuks Astro

12 May 2018
17:00

Madibaz	2-4	NWU
Coombs 25'; Fanoe 27'	Report	Thessner 13'; Ludick 60'

Tuks Astro

12 May 2018
18:45

Tuks	4-5	Maties
Paulo 2'; Pio 26'	Report	Samboer 7', 19'; Roman 28'

Tuks Astro

13 May 2018
13:30

Madibaz	2-7	Wits
Wynford 45'	Report	Futcher 13', 38'; Abrahams 47'; Ramburuth-Hurt 58'

Tuks Astro

13 May 2018
15:15

NWU	4-0	Ikeys
Makan 8'; Ludick 53'	Report

Tuks Astro

13 May 2018
17:00

Maties	15-2	UJ
Arendse 8', 17', 30'; Roman 35'; Samboer 51', 57', 57'; Pike 58'	Report	February 47'

Tuks Astro

13 May 2018
18:45

Tuks	8-0	Kovsie
Forrest 16', 23'; Kemp 17'; Paulo 21'; Sherwood 26'	Report

Tuks Astro

=== Seven place game ===
14 May 2018
13:30

Kovsie	0-6	Madibaz
	Report	Fanoe 12'; Coombs 13', 18'

Tuks Astro

=== Five place game ===
14 May 2018
15:15

Ikeys	6-5	UJ
Solomons 8'; Cole 53'; Alfeld 55'	Report	Dube 2'; Gilbert 26'; Blackie-roden 27'; Jacobs 28'

Tuks Astro

=== Semi-final ===
14 May 2018
17:00

Maties	2-2	NWU
Ludick 3'	Report	Samboer 39', 47'
Penalties
Hobson (penalty shoot-out scored); Dollman (penalty shoot-out missed); Tate (penalty shoot-out missed); Arendse (penalty shoot-out scored)	2-0	Kenny (penalty shoot-out missed); Makan (penalty shoot-out missed); Mbekeni (penalty shoot-out missed); Botma (penalty shoot-out missed)

Tuks Astro

14 May 2018
18:45

Tuks	6-6	Wits
Currie 22'; Sherwood 31', 49', 56'; Lembethe 60'	Report	Botes 10'; James 19', 51', 59'
Penalties
Ashley Kemp (penalty shoot-out missed); Davies (penalty shoot-out missed); Redfern (penalty shoot-out scored); Sherwood (penalty shoot-out scored); Paulo (penalty shoot-out scored); Paulo (penalty shoot-out scored)	4-3	James (penalty shoot-out missed); Le Forestier (penalty shoot-out scored); Ramburuth-Hurt (penalty shoot-out missed) van Wyk (penalty shoot-out scored); Chad Futcher (penalty shoot-out scored); James (penalty shoot-out missed)

Tuks Astro

=== Final ===
21 May 2018
18:45

Tuks	5-0	Maties
Mvimbi 8'; Sherwood 30'; Paulo 56'	Report

Tuks Astro

== Final standings ==
Pos	Team
1	Maties
2	Tuks
3	Wits (H)
4	NWU
5	Ikeys
6	UJ
7	Kovsie
8	Madibaz

Source: SA Hockey
(H) Host

== Goalscorers ==
There have been 272 goals scored in 33 matches, for an average of 8.24 goals per match.

14 goals

- Reece Arendse (Maties)
- Kingsley Botes (Wits)

13 goals

- Dayne Samboer (Maties)
- Steven Paulo (Tuks)

12 goals

- Bradley Sherwood (Tuks)

10 goals

- Killian Ludick (NWU)

9 goals

- Brandon James (Wits)
- Michael Forrest (Tuks)

8 goals

- Che February (UJ)

7 goals

- Pierre Botma (NWU)
- Chad Futcher (Wits)
- Rusten Abrahams (Wits)
- Brodie Fanoe (Madibaz)

6 goals

- Luke Schooling (Maties)
- Snyman Thessner (NWU)

5 goals

- Laython Coombs (Madibaz)
- Maximilian Pike (Maties)

4 goals

- Courtney Halle (UJ)
- Tim Alfeld (Ikeys)
- Dan Cole (Ikeys)
- Bryce Cressy (Wits)
- Wayne Jeffery (NWU)
- Ashley Kemp (Tuks)
- Willie Kruger (Kovsie)
- Mitesh Makan (NWU)
- Sinoxolo Mbekeni (NWU)
- Matthew Mckechnie (Ikeys)
- Walter Pfaff (Ikeys)
- Matthew Roman (Maties)
- Alex Stewart (Maties)
- Stéphan van Vollenhoven (Kovsie)

3 goals

- Kyle Lion-Cachet (UJ)
- Clayton Saker (Maties)
- Ross Talmage (Ikeys)

2 goals

- Richard Asmah-andoh (Madibaz)
- Tristan Blackie-roden (UJ)
- Spencer Botes (UJ)
- Sean Donaldson (Wits)
- Jack Forrest (Ikeys)
- Michael Gildenhuys (Ikeys)
- Tim Halle (Tuks)
- Michael Hansel (Madibaz)
- Mvelase Mbombisa (Kovsie)
- Thabang Modise (Wits)
- Sam Mvimbi (Tuks)
- Nicholas Pio (Tuks)
- Kamal Ramburuth-Hurt (Wits)
- Justin Smouse (Kovsie)
- Daiyaan Solomons (Ikeys)
- Clayton Tait (NWU)
- Gareth Tate (Maties)
- Egon van der Merwe (Kovsie)
- Tiaan Weldhagen (Kovsie)
- Christopher Wynford (Madibaz)
- Rayner York (UJ)

1 goal

- Francois Cilliers (NWU)
- Mitchell Currie (Tuks)
- Manessah Dube (UJ)
- Nicholas Giger (Maties)
- James Gilbert (UJ)
- Ernest Jacobs (UJ)
- Peabo Lembethe (Tuks)
- Michael Marki (Wits)
- Stean Naude (NWU)
- Keoghan Penhall (Madibaz)
- Jacques Potgieter (Madibaz)
- Jaydee Rossouw (Ikeys)
- James Watters (Ikeys)

Source: SAHA

== Awards ==
The following awards were given at the conclusion of the tournament.

Player of the tournament	Goalkeeper of the tournament	Top goalscorer
Sinoxolo Mbekeni (NWU)	Rob McKinley (Maties)	Dayne Samboer (Maties)
