= 2026 Men's FIH Hockey World Cup bidding process =

The 2026 Men's FIH Hockey World Cup bidding process entails the bids for the 2026 Men's FIH Hockey World Cup. The hosting rights were given to Belgium and Netherlands.

== Bids ==
The International Hockey Federation announced on 15 June 2022 that they had received the following four bids for the 2026 World Cup.

=== For men's event ===
- England (in partnership with Wales)
- Germany (Withdrew)
- South Africa

=== For men's and women's event ===
- Belgium and Netherlands
- South Africa

== Men's event ==
=== England and Wales ===
England and Wales filed an application for the FIH Men's World Cup, promising to host the biggest World Cup ever. The bid would utilise using the English Hockey Association's "Big Stadium Hockey" to bring hockey fields into football and rugby stadiums. The proposed venues were Twickenham Stoop in London, Franklin's Gardens in Northampton, Cardiff Arms Park in Cardiff and the Tottenham Hotspur Stadium for the semifinals and final. The bid claimed that 300,000 tickets would be on sale, starting at £5. Former Wales captain, Rupert Shipperley, said that the bid could transform Field Hockey in the country. England Hockey president, Nick Pink, stated they wanted to be bold with the bid. This would be England's second time hosting after 1986 and Wales' first time hosting.

"All of us within the sport know how amazing hockey is, and by hosting a world cup on home soil, at Cardiff Arms Park, cinch Stadium Franklin's Gardens, Twickenham Stoop and Tottenham Hotspur Stadium, we would create the opportunity to take hockey to new fans and new cities. The event showcases the best the sport has to offer on the pitch, and also creates a platform to build a lasting social impact through the sport across the UK. With the Commonwealth Games currently taking place in Birmingham we've seen great support for international hockey. We'd like to encourage the hockey community to Back The Bid; your support is absolutely essential to our bid and how we can deliver the most impactful hockey event ever seen on these shores.

— England Hockey president, Nick Pink, and Hockey Wales president, Ria Burgage Male.

(England) London	2026 Men's FIH Hockey World Cup bidding process is located in England	(England) Northampton
Tottenham Hotspur Stadium; Capacity: 62,850	2026 Men's FIH Hockey World Cup bidding process is located in England	Franklin's Gardens; Capacity: 15,249
London	2026 Men's FIH Hockey World Cup bidding process is located in England	(Wales) Cardiff
Twickenham Stoop; Capacity: 14,800	2026 Men's FIH Hockey World Cup bidding process is located in England	Cardiff Arms Park; Capacity: 12,125

=== South Africa ===
South Africa hoped to be the first African hosts with Potchefstroom as the host city. SA Hockey stated that after successfully hosting the 2022 Women's FIH Hockey Junior World Cup, they were keen in hosting the senior event.

"The FIH have today announced the bids for the 2026 World Cup tournaments. South Africa have bid to host either the FIH Women's Hockey World Cup or the FIH Men's Hockey World Cup in Potchefstroom in 2026. South Africa have also bid to host both tournaments at the same time. Following the successful staging of the FIH Women's Junior World Cup in Potchefstroom this year, the first African-based World Cup, the country and North West University are keen to host the main event."

— Statement from SA Hockey.

South Africa have never hosted the FIH World Cup, but has hosted the 2022 Women's FIH Hockey Junior World Cup and the Men's FIH Hockey Nations Cup in 2022 and 2025–26. South Africa have also hosted numerous African championships.

2026 Men's FIH Hockey World Cup bidding process is located in South Africa	Potchefstroom
2026 Men's FIH Hockey World Cup bidding process is located in South Africa	NWU Astro
2026 Men's FIH Hockey World Cup bidding process is located in South Africa	Capacity: Unknown

== Men's and women's event ==
=== Belgium and Netherlands ===
Belgium and Netherlands wants to host both World Cups in 2026, with Wavre, Belgium and Amstelveen, Netherlands being the host cities. Serge Pilet, president of the Royal Belgian Hockey Association, says that with hosting both World Cups, it guarantees that both countries will have a game involving the hosts every day, maximising the amount of tickets that can be sold. He also says that their bid is strong due to the countries' proven track records in hosting field hockey events and the strength of the national teams. In September 2022, a problem came about with the venue in Wavre as construction had not began yet, with one of the causes being that they were 2 million euros short of the money necessary for the renovation plans. This would be the Netherlands' fourth time hosting after 1973, 1998 and 2014. This would be Belgium's first time hosting.

(Netherlands) Amstelveen	2026 Men's FIH Hockey World Cup bidding process is located in Benelux	(Belgium) Wavre
Wagener Stadium	2026 Men's FIH Hockey World Cup bidding process is located in Benelux	Belfius Hockey Arena
Capacity: 10,000	2026 Men's FIH Hockey World Cup bidding process is located in Benelux	Capacity: 10,000

=== South Africa ===
Alongside bidding for the men's event separately, South Africa were bidding for both events in Potchefstroom.

2026 Men's FIH Hockey World Cup bidding process is located in South Africa	Potchefstroom
2026 Men's FIH Hockey World Cup bidding process is located in South Africa	NWU Astro
2026 Men's FIH Hockey World Cup bidding process is located in South Africa	Capacity: Unknown

== Withdrawn bid ==
=== Germany ===
Germany originally filed an application, with Carola Meyer, president of the German Hockey Federation, saying that many venues were interested in hosting.

"We have a great interest in hosting the men's World Championship because the World Cup is the most prestigious event in hockey in the world after the Olympic Games. The 2006 World Cup in Mönchengladbach showed the resonance that can be generated by spectators and the public in Germany. We want to strengthen German hockey through top-class events. As part of the preparations for the 2023 European Hockey Championship, we have already created the organizational conditions within the DHB to be able to host a World Championship. Currently, we have received signals of interest in hosting the Men's World Championship from various venues. Hockey Germany would react euphorically to an award and is eagerly awaiting the application process."

— Carola Meyer, president of the German Hockey Federation.

However, the Germans withdrew in October 2022 due to the economic risks of hosting, alongside the requirements the FIH were asking for were too difficult to achieve. The proposed venues were never defined.

== Hosts announcement ==
Wavre, Belgium and Amstelveen, Netherlands were awarded the hosting rights on 3 November 2022.

"On behalf of FIH, I would like to thank wholeheartedly all National Associations that submitted a bid. We received excellent proposals and it was therefore a particularly challenging task to decide. We’re very much looking forward to working with the National Associations of the current Women's and Men's World and Olympic Champions, the Netherlands and Belgium respectively, that will undoubtedly put together outstanding World Cups!

— FIH CEO, Thierry Weil.
