= Mesontoplatys mungo =

Scientific classification
- Kingdom: Animalia
- Phylum: Arthropoda
- Clade: Pancrustacea
- Class: Insecta
- Order: Coleoptera
- Suborder: Polyphaga
- Infraorder: Scarabaeiformia
- Family: Scarabaeidae
- Genus: Mesontoplatys
- Species: M. mungo

Binomial name
- Mesontoplatys mungo (Balthasar, 1946)

Synonyms
- Aphodius (Mesontoplatys) mungo Balthasar, 1946

Species of beetle

Mesontoplatys mungo is a species of beetle of the family Scarabaeidae. It is found in India (Rajasthan, Tamil Nadu).

== Description ==
Adults reach a length of about 3 mm (0.12 in). They have an elongate-oval, highly glossy, glabrous body. The head is reddish-brown and the pronotum is brown with yellow sides. The elytra are yellowish-brown, with a triangular dark mark. The legs are yellowish-brown.
