= Amazulu (disambiguation) =

The amaZulu are the Zulu people of southern Africa.

Amazulu or AmaZulu may also refer to:

- AmaZulu F.C., a South African football club
- Amazulu FC (Zimbabwe), a defunct Zimbabwean football club
- Amazulu (band), a British ska band of the 1980s
- AmaZulu: The Children of Heaven, a 2006 British documentary film directed by Hannan Majid and Richard York
- Amazulu (album), debut studio album of South African singer-songwriter Amanda Black
- "Amazulu" (song), a 2016 song by Amanda Black

== See also ==
- Zulu (disambiguation)
- Zululand (disambiguation)
