= 2022 Men's Varsity Hockey (South Africa) =

Tournament details
- Host country: Pretoria
- City: South Africa
- Dates: 5 October 2022–6 October 2022
- Venue: University of Pretoria

Final positions
- Champions: Tuks
- Runner-up: Wits
- Third place: Maties

Tournament statistics
- Matches played: 4
- Goals scored: 30 (7.5 per match)
- Top scorer(s): Kenoe Christians (UJ); Guy Morgan (Tuks) (4 goals)
- Best player: Bradley Sherwood

The 2022 Men's Hockey Varsity Hockey will be the 10th edition of the Varsity Hockey, the annual tournament men's field hockey championship of South Africa.

In addition to the Power Play rule seen in previous seasons of Varsity Hockey, whereby each team can select to implement a two-minute period where goals count two and the opposition must bench two players, field goals will now count two.

== Results ==
=== Fixtures ===
5 October 2022
18:20

| Wits | 5–3 | UJ |
|---|---|---|
| Hermanus 5'; Van den Berg 34'; Lourens 56' | Report | Bennett 21'; Christians 49' |

5 October 2022
20:20

| Maties | 2–5 | Tuks |
|---|---|---|
| Jarvis 17' | Report | Campbell 2'; Morgan 51' de Lora 55' |

=== 3 & 4 ===
6 October 2022
13:00

| UJ | 3–5 | Maties |
|---|---|---|
| Bennett 10'; Christians 34' | Report | Van Tonder 2'; Proctor 8'; Melville 44' |

=== Final ===
6 October 2022
18:30

| Tuks | 4–3 | Wits |
|---|---|---|
| Morgan 4', 6', 51'; Sherwood 44' | Report | Lourens 23'; Riley 40'; Horan 53' |

== Final standings ==
| Pos | Team |
|---|---|
| 1st place, gold medalist(s) | Tuks (H) |
| 2nd place, silver medalist(s) | WITS |
| 3rd place, bronze medalist(s) | Maties |
| 4 | UJ |

Source: SA Hockey
(H) Host

== Goalscorers ==
There were 30 goals scored in 4 matches, for an average of 7.5 goals per match.

4 goals

- Kenoe Christians (UJ)
- Guy Morgan (Tuks)

2 goals

- Peter Jarvis (Maties)
- Kenton Melville (Maties)
- Ben Proctor (Maties)
- Dechlan Bennett (UJ)
- Jared Campbell (Tuks)
- Trevor de Lora (Tuks)
- Liam Hermanus (Wits)
- Luke Lourens (Wits)
- Michael van den Berg (Wits)

1 goal

- Jacques van Tonder (Maties)
- Bradley Sherwood (Tuks)
- Michael Horan (Wits)
- Brad Riley (Wits)

Source: SAHA
