= Mesontoplatys dorsalis =

Scientific classification
- Kingdom: Animalia
- Phylum: Arthropoda
- Clade: Pancrustacea
- Class: Insecta
- Order: Coleoptera
- Suborder: Polyphaga
- Infraorder: Scarabaeiformia
- Family: Scarabaeidae
- Genus: Mesontoplatys
- Species: M. dorsalis

Binomial name
- Mesontoplatys dorsalis (Klug, 1855)

Synonyms
- Aphodius dorsalis Klug, 1855; Aphodius tenuitarsis Fairmaire, 1897

Species of beetle

Mesontoplatys dorsalis is a species of beetle of the family Scarabaeidae. It is found in Chad, Ethiopia, Ghana, Ivory Coast, Kenya, Mozambique, Namibia, the Democratic Republic of the Congo, Guinea, South Africa (Eastern Cape, KwaZulu-Natal), Senegal, Sudan, Tanzania, Madagascar, the Comores, Afghanistan, Saudi Arabia and possibly India and Sri Lanka.

== Description ==
Adults reach a length of about 2.5–3 mm (0.098–0.118 in). They have a quite broad, strongly convex, shiny body. The forebody is reddish-brown, while the elytra are light brown with a dark triangular spot.
