= Sulu (disambiguation) =

Sulu is a province of the Philippines.

Sulu may also refer to:

== Locations ==
=== Philippines ===
- Sulu Archipelago, in the Philippines
- Sulu Sea, in the southwestern area of the Philippines
- Apostolic Prefecture of Sulu, a Catholic missionary jurisdiction in the Sulu Archipelago from 1953 to 1958
- Sultanate of Sulu (1457–1917), in the Philippines
  - Royal House of Sulu of the Sultanate of Sulu

=== Estonia ===
- Sulu, Rapla County, village in Märjamaa Parish, Rapla County, Estonia
- Sulu, Tartu County, village in Kambja Parish, Tartu County, Estonia

== People ==
- Aytaç Sulu (born 1985), German-Turkish football player
- Suluk (Turgesh khagan), or Sulu (died c. 738), leader of the Turgesh confederation

=== Fictional characters ===
- Hikaru Sulu, fictional character in Star Trek
- Sulu (Captain Underpants)
- Title character of the 2017 Indian film Tumhari Sulu

== Other uses ==
- Sulu (skirt), a garment worn in Fiji

== See also ==
- Zulu (disambiguation)
