= Monk Square Revolution =

Studio album by Maiko Zulu
- Released: 2008
- Recorded: Maiko Zulu Studio, Lusaka, Zambia
- Genre: Reggae
- Producer: Dread Arts Production

Monk square revolution is a Reggae album by Maiko Zulu. The album was produced in 2008 with the hit song Monk Square Revolution. The album may have been inspired by University of Zambia demonstrations that normally begins outside a student halls of residence called Monk square. This album is also one of the few reggae albums in Africa which features a song to encourages people to vote in a democratic elections.

All lyrics are written by Maiko Zulu; all music is composed by Maiko Zulu

No.	Title	Length
1.	"Monk Square Revolution"
2.	"Why Must I Vote"
3.	"Amsterdam"
4.	"Tribal Stupidity"
5.	"Banned On ZNBC"
6.	"Asogoleli"
7.	"Let It Shine"
8.	"Ghetto Revisited"
9.	"Third World War"
10.	"Good Man"
