= Mad President =

Studio album by Maiko Zulu
- Released: 2006
- Recorded: Maiko Zulu Studio, Lusaka, Zambia
- Genre: Reggae
- Producer: Dread Arts Production

mad President is a Reggae album by Maiko Zulu. The album was produced in 2006 with the hit song Mad president. Zambian owned state media, ZNBC refused to play the song. The song Mad president talks of a tyranny president, who thinks he the judge, policeman, prosecutor, he hires and dismiss staff whenever he feel like

== Tracklist ==
All lyrics are written by Maiko Zulu; all music is composed by Maiko Zulu.

No.	Title	Length
1.	"Mad President"
2.	"Vampire Church"
3.	"China Town"
4.	"Queen of the Ghetto"
5.	"Tell It All"
6.	"Zimbabwe"
7.	"Jah Fire"
8.	"Blood Diamonds"
9.	"Morningside"
10.	"Come Back Jesus"
11.	"Pokomania"
12.	"Amolotoni"
13.	"Zulu Dawn (instr)"
14.	"Willy Again (instr)"
