= Mesontoplatys arabicus =

Scientific classification
- Kingdom: Animalia
- Phylum: Arthropoda
- Clade: Pancrustacea
- Class: Insecta
- Order: Coleoptera
- Suborder: Polyphaga
- Infraorder: Scarabaeiformia
- Family: Scarabaeidae
- Genus: Mesontoplatys
- Species: M. arabicus

Binomial name
- Mesontoplatys arabicus (Harold, 1875)

Synonyms
- Aphodius arabicus Harold, 1875; Aphodius basalis Schmidt, 1906; Aphodius plagiatus Raffray, 1877

Species of beetle

Mesontoplatys arabicus is a species of beetle of the family Scarabaeidae. It is found in Egypt, Iran, Israel, Kuwait, Oman, Saudi Arabia, the United Arab Emirates, Yemen, Eritrea and Ethiopia.

== Description ==
Adults reach a length of about 4 mm (0.16 in). They have a moderately shiny, glabrous, slightly convex, reddish-yellow body. Most of the head, the disc of the pronotum, the scutellum, the sutural interval, and a scutellar spot are all brownish-black.
