= Music of Zambia =

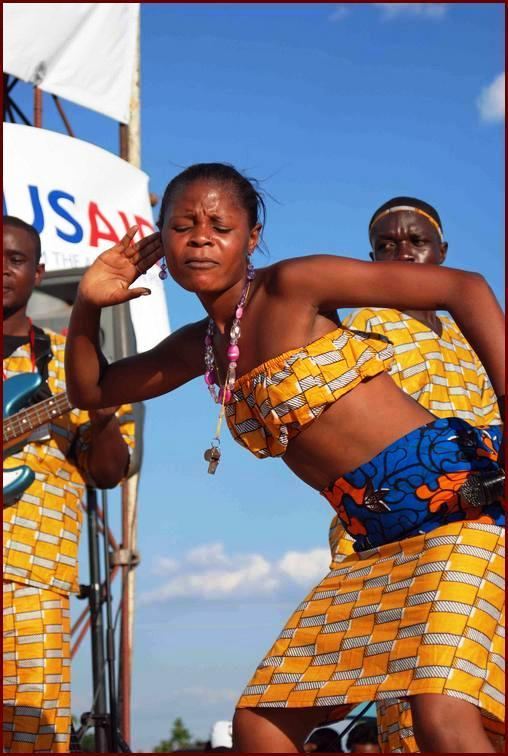
A musician performs in Zambia.

The music of Zambia has a rich heritage which falls roughly into categories of traditional, popular and Christian music.

== Traditional Music ==
Traditional Zambian music is rooted in the beliefs and practices of Zambia's various ethnic groups and has suffered some decline in the last three decades. Traditional Zambian music once had clear ritual purposes or was an expression of the social fabric of the culture. Songs were used to teach, to heal, to appeal to spirits, and for mere enjoyment. Despite the decline of traditional music, its influences can still be heard in many of today's Zambian musical forms. The ubiquitous African "call-and-response" can be heard in almost every Zambian song no matter what the style. Traditional drum rhythms and polymeters are evident in many different kinds of Zambian music. Contemporary popular forms such as Zambian Kalindula also exhibit traces of traditional music in the finger-picking style used by guitarists and other musicians.

=== Instruments ===
Traditional Zambian instruments include a variety of membranophones, both stick-struck and hand-struck. Drums are essential for most traditional dances. Ngoma is the generic central Bantu term for drum, but Zambian drums come in a variety of sizes, shapes, and purposes and have specific names depending on their tribal origins and functional roles. The Budima drums of the Valley Tonga, for example, are used specifically for funeral ceremonies. Budima drums have a goblet shape and come in sizes ranging from large to small. One of the most interesting of drums is the so-called "lion drum" (Namalwa in Tonga) used at traditional funerals. This is a friction drum which is not struck at all but which has a stick inserted through the drumhead that is rubbed. The silimba is a large 17-note xylophone from Western Province.

Chordophones and aerophones are less common in traditional Zambian music but exist nonetheless. The Valley Tonga play instruments made from animal horns called Nyeele. Nyeele are played using an interlocking technique with individual musicians each playing a single horn and interlocking with other musicians who have Nyeele of different pitches. A chordophone called a kalumbu was traditionally played by young men to signal their desire to marry. Called a 'musical bow' by ethnomusicologists because of its bow shape, the kalumbu is struck by a stick. Like many other central African countries, Zambia once had a vibrant tradition of so-called "thumb pianos," each with a different name depending on tribal origins: the Tonga kankobela is one such thumb piano, the Mbunda "kathandi", the Lozi "kangombio", the Lunda "chisanzhi", the Nsenga "kalimba", etc. Although the use of traditional instruments has declined in recent years, they can still be heard in rural areas of Zambia.

Recordings of traditional Zambian music were made in the mid-twentieth century by Hugh Tracey and Arthur Morris Jones, both well-known ethnomusicologists of African music. Tracey recorded all over Zambia in the 1950s, but also specifically recorded in the Zambezi Valley in 1958 at the request of anthropologist Elizabeth Colson before the creation of the Kariba Dam, and Jones did his at Mapanza in Zambia's Southern Province. Catholic missionaries, J. J. Corbeil and Frank Wafer have also contributed to our knowledge of traditional Zambian music. Father Corbeil collected and documented the instrumental tradition of the Bemba in Northeastern Zambia. Frank Wafer, a Jesuit priest located at Chikuni, has collected and preserved Batonga music. A community radio station dedicated to promoting Batonga music and culture is also part of the Chikuni Mission Station. They organize an annual festival of Batonga music which attracts as many as 10,000 visitors according to the organizers. Recent ethnomusicological work has been done by native Zambians such as Mwesa Isaiah Mapoma, Joseph Ng'andu, John Anderson Mwesa and others. Recent field recordings made by native Zambian Michael Baird in Southern Province have been released on his SWP label, as well as producing two excellent compilations of Zambian hits from the 60s, 70s and 80s.

== Popular Music ==
After independence in 1964, the most important source of popular music was the Zambia National Broadcasting Service and affiliated bands like Lusaka Radio Band, who soon changed their name to The Big Gold Six. Record companies soon formed, with most recordings made at Peter Msungilo's DB Studios in Lusaka, and records pressed in Ndola by the Teal Record Company.

The northern, copper-producing area of Zambia was known for singers like John Lushi, William Mapulanga and Stephen Tsotsi Kasumali. Their guitar-based music grew gradually into Zamrock, which used mostly English lyrics in rock songs. Bands included the Machine-Gunners and Musi-o-tunya. The most popular band in Zambian history soon emerged, Jaggari Chanda's Witch.

In the late 1970s, President Kenneth Kaunda ordered that 95% of the music on the radio had to be Zambian. He hoped to encourage the formation of a Zambian national identity. Rather than using their folk roots, however, Zambians attempted to become pop stars. By the mid-1980s, the result was kalindula music. Bands included the Masasu Band, Serenje Kalindula and Junior Mulemena Boys. Amayenge is considered one of the best kalindula bands of the past twenty years. Another top artist is Brian Chilala who, together with his band Ngoma Zasu, continues in the electric kalindula tradition. An annual concert of traditional bands (not just kalindula) was recently begun by the Chikuni Radio station in Chikuni in the Southern Province. Two of the most popular bands from that festival are Green Mamba and Mashombe Blue Jeans. In addition, artists such as Alfred Chisala Kalusha Jr. based their compositions on "Imfukutu" - Bemba folk music.

In the 1990s, economic problems caused the collapse of the Zambian music industry. Unfettered by rules promoting Zambian music, the airwaves were covered with imported ragga and reggae from Jamaica and hip hop and R&B from the United States.

The Zambian entertainment industry recognizes popular musicians at its annual Ngoma Awards. The Ngoma Awards amount to a Zambian version of the all-Africa Kora Awards. At the moment K'Millian, Macky 2, Slap dee, Chef 187 and Yo Maps are the very popular artists. A unique hybrid form of Zambian music is found in the so-called "banjo" tradition. The Zambian "banjo" (pronounced 'bahn-jo') is essentially a homemade guitar. A wide variety of such instruments can be found in different sizes and with varying numbers of strings. Most are played using a two or three finger picking style, and the tuning of each instrument is unique to that instrument. The body is made in various shapes from wood or sometimes tin cans, and the strings or 'wires' often come from discarded radial tires. Zambian banjos are used in kalindula bands throughout Zambia. Sharing of these songs are done via local bloggers, The Kamandeji Group as one of the pioneers.

== Christian Music ==
Popular influences can also be heard in the newer repertory, some of which is borrowed from urban contemporary gospel, some from so-called "contemporary Christian music" from the United States, and some from Zambian popular idioms. The use of electronic synthesizers and guitars has also made its way into the church. The flow of influence between church music and the popular realm can also be heard in recordings by groups such as Lumbani Madoda, Zambian Acapella, Lota House and Hosanna Band which has been disbanded.

The influence of Euro-American hymnody is also evident in the music of many Zambian congregations. Hymns from British and American hymnals continue to be part of the musical fabric of many churches, and many harmonic practices are derived from Western hymn influences. Invented by John Curwen, the system Tonic Sol-fa was imported into Africa by the British in the nineteenth century. The Heritage Singers Choir, the Heritage Brothers Quartet, and church helped popularise this form of harmonious music worldwide.

== Recordings ==
- Brown, Ernest. Songs of the Spirits: The Royal Music of the Nkoya of Zambia. Lusaka, Zambia: University of Zambia Institute for African Studies, 1976.
- Baird, Michael. Batonga Across the Waters. Utrecht, The Netherlands: SWP Records, 1997.
- Baird, Michael. Zambia Roadside - Music from Southern Province. Utrecht, The Netherlands: SWP Records, 2003.
- "Zambush Vol. 1. - Zambian hits from the 80s." Utrecht, The Netherlands: SWP Records, 2004.
- "Zambush Vol. 2 - Zambian hits from the 60s and 70s." Utrecht, The Netherlands: SWP Records, 2004.
- Daddy, Zemus. Chibaba. Lusaka, Zambia: Mondo Music Corp., 1999.
- Guitar Songs from Tanzania, Zambia & Zaire. Tivloi, N.Y.: Original Music, 1982.
- Hosanna Gospel Band. Lesa Tupepa. Lusaka, Zambia: Mondo Music Corp., 2004.
- J, K. JK. Lusaka, Zambia: Mondo Music Corp., 2001.
- Shoprite Zambia Hit Parade. Lusaka, Zambia: Mondo Music Corp., 2001.
- Tracey, Hugh. "Kalimba & Kalumbu Songs, Northern Rhodesia Zambia, 1952 & 1957: Lala, Tonga, Lozi, Mbunda, Bemba, Lunda." Historical recordings / by Hugh Tracey. Utrecht, The Netherlands: SWP Records, 1998. Produced and remastered by Michael Baird.
- Zambian Acapella. Zambian Acapella. Corsicana, Tex.: Paradox Music, 1993.
- Baird, Michael. "The Kankobela of the Batonga Vol. 1." Utrecht, The Netherlands: SWP Records 2008.
- Baird, Michael. "The Kankobela of the Batonga Vol. 2." Utrecht, The Netherlands: SWP Records 2011.
- Baird, Michael "Zambia Roadside 2." Utrecht, The Netherlands: SWP Records 2013.
