= Mesontoplatys rufolaterus =

Scientific classification
- Kingdom: Animalia
- Phylum: Arthropoda
- Clade: Pancrustacea
- Class: Insecta
- Order: Coleoptera
- Suborder: Polyphaga
- Infraorder: Scarabaeiformia
- Family: Scarabaeidae
- Genus: Mesontoplatys
- Species: M. rufolaterus

Binomial name
- Mesontoplatys rufolaterus Motschulsky, 1863

Synonyms
- Aphodius rufolaterus (Motschulsky, 1864); Aphodius tranquebaricus Harold, 1874

Species of beetle

Mesontoplatys rufolaterus, is a species of dung beetle found from Indian subcontinent, throughout Sri Lanka, India, Pakistan, and many African countries such as Cameroon, Chad, Ethiopia, Ivory Coast, Madagascar, Senegal, Sudan, Republic Democratic of Congo, and the Republic of Guinea.

== Description ==
Adults reach a length of about 2.5–3.5 mm (0.098–0.138 in). They have a stout, convex, rather shiny, glabrous, brown-blackish body. The clypeus and lateral margins of the pronotum are reddish, and the elytra are brown-yellowish with a scutellar piceous spot.
