= PK Chishala =

Zambian Kalindula Musician (1957–1996)

- Born: Peter Kalumba Chishala; October 10, 1957; Kitwe, Zambia
- Burial place: Chingola, Zambia
- Occupations: Musician; songwriter; singer
- Works: PK Chishala discography
- Musical career
- Genres: Kalindula; Zambian Music
- Instruments: Guitar, Drum
- Years active: 1984–1996
- Labels: Money Culture Recordings(reissues); Teal Records Co.; Kariba Music

Peter Kalumba Chishala better known by his stage name PK Chishala, was a Zambian musician. He is considered by many, to be one of the greatest musicians of the Kalindula genre. He contributed to the development and popularising the genre. His signature song is "Common Man", he has also produced several hits i.e. "Pole-Pole (church elder)", "Na Musonda", "Mwaume Walutuku","Tondolo" and so forth.

== Music career ==
He debuted with "Icisosa Cipamano", which he recorded at Malachite Studios during his school days. Although it was not a huge success, the song gave an indication of what he was capable of doing. He followed it up with "Ba Pastor", which took a swipe at the immoral behavior of pastors. Naturally, it did not go down well in religious circles. Some sections of society thought that the song was a true story, but PK refuted that. Some called for it to be banned saying it was blasphemous. But despite the controversy, it went on to win the Song of the Year award in 1985. He followed it up with the album Church Elder, released under the Kariba label by Teal Record Company, and whose title-track exposes the misdeeds of one "church elder" by the name of Pole Pole. The album had other songs like "Impumba Mikowa", a lament from orphans complaining about their plight, and "Mulele", a Luvale song advising a school girl to first complete her education instead of rushing into marriage. The title-track won PK the 1987 Soloist of the Year Award, and made him the country's flag bearer at the 1988 World of Music and Dance (WOMAD) Festival, an annual event held in the UK. He was sponsored by Teal Record and was backed by the Masasu Band. P.K. Chishala & the Great Pekachi Band was one of the first wave of kalindula music along with Junior Mulemena Boys, and the Masasu Band. One of the songs that he performed there, Umuti wa Aids, was featured on the WOMAD compilation album. After that, he released "Na Musonda", on which he introduced his wife "Harriet" on backing vocals. The album also had the humorous song Kubwaiche. In 1993, he Released his fourth album Umwaume walutuku. For the song "Common man", the late P.K Chishala was once observed to be against the then President Kenneth Kaunda.

The song was originally composed and performed by Bennet Simbeye. The album also had the satirical Muchibolya and the danceable Lelo ni Weekend, which is highly popular at weddings.

== Discography ==
=== Studio albums ===
List of studio albums
Title	Album details
Church Elder	Released: 1986; Label: Kariba; Format: Vinyl, LP
Harriet Chishala	Released: 1990; Label: Kariba; Format:Vinyl CD, LP
"Common Man"	Released: Unknown; Label: Teal Record Company; Format: Vinyl, CD

=== Popular songs ===
- Church elder
- Chimbaya mbaya
- Na Musonda
- Nakufele
- Umunadi
- Mwaume Walutuku
- Common man
