= The Peace (band) =

Zamrock band active in the 1970s

The Peace were a zamrock band, formed in the Chamboli Mine Township of Kitwe, Zambia in the early 1970s.

== History ==
The members of Peace formerly played in The Boyfriends, which was also the parent group for fellow Zambian band Witch. Founding members of the band included Stuggy Joe Kunda, Gedeon "Giddy Kings" Mwamulenga and John "Music" Muma, whereas the final lineup consisted of Teddy Makombe (lead guitar and vocals), Bruce Kaunda (guitar), Brower Machuta (drums) and Saul Manda (bass).

Though the band came together in the early 70s, their lyrics mostly referenced late-60s themes like love, peace and freedom, and their music refers to pop psychedelics in the likes of Jefferson Airplane, the funk of James Brown and the rock bits of Jimi Hendrix, partly due to their emerging in the early post-independence Zambia. This mixture made their only traceable release, Black Power, which was recorded ca 1973/1974 and released 1975 on ZMPL, unique within the zamrock scene, a somewhat late echo of the flower power era, fueled by a revolutionary spirit.

In 1976, The Peace went on a three-week tour in Botswana, on which they made more money than on the entire release of their debut album. Later that year, they recorded a second album, called Black Is Beautiful, but it remains lost to this day. Shortly after, the band split up.

Bandleader Teddy Makombe died in 1994, aged 54, after pursuing a career as a sign painter.
