= Mesontoplatys parvulus =

Scientific classification
- Kingdom: Animalia
- Phylum: Arthropoda
- Clade: Pancrustacea
- Class: Insecta
- Order: Coleoptera
- Suborder: Polyphaga
- Infraorder: Scarabaeiformia
- Family: Scarabaeidae
- Genus: Mesontoplatys
- Species: M. parvulus

Binomial name
- Mesontoplatys parvulus (Harold, 1871)

Synonyms
- Aphodius parvulus Harold, 1871; Aphodius (Orodalus) roissi Petrovitz, 1961; Aphodius atomus Fairmaire, 1897

Species of beetle

Mesontoplatys parvulus is a species of beetle of the family Scarabaeidae. It is found in Burkina Faso, Cameroon, the Central African Republic, Chad, Ethiopia, Ghana, Ivory Coast, Niger, the Democratic Republic of the Congo, Guinea, the Republic of the Congo, Senegal, Sudan, Zambia, Madagascar and India (Haryana, Rajasthan, Himachal Pradesh, Uttarakhand).

== Description ==
Adults reach a length of about 2.4–2.8 mm (0.094–0.110 in). They have a very shiny, smooth, dark brown to reddish-brown body, with the sides of the pronotum lighter.
