= OC Osilliation =

- Born: Siame Obrien; 25 August 1984 (age 41); Lusaka, Zambia
- Other name: OC
- Occupations: Musician, songwriter and producer
- Musical career
- Years active: 2004–present
- Labels: Obama Records and Entertainment
- Website: ocofficial.com

Siame O'Brien (born 25 August 1984), better known by his stage names OC Osilliation or OC, is a recording artist and producer from Lusaka, Zambia. He is also the CEO of recording studio Obama Records and Entertainment; which has produced four studio albums. OC has also released several top selling singles, including "Folo Folo", " Wangu ni Wangu", "Wacha Wachema", "Rafiki", and "Last Forever" which continue to be fan favorites and most requested.

His song "Wacha Wachema" from his first album titled My Name is OC won an award for Best Reggae music at the Born and Bread Awards.

== Awards and nominations ==
=== Awards won ===
- 2008 Born And Bred Award for Best Reggae – "Wacha Wachema" ft Petersen
- 2012 Born and Bred award for Best collaborative song – "Lastforever"

=== Nominations ===
- 2014 – Best Ni Yatu( Zed Beats) Album: OC (Folo Folo Me).

== Discography ==
=== Albums ===
- My Name Is OC
- Wangu Ni Wangu
- Goose Bumps
- Folo Folo

=== Selected music ===
- "Fwenya"
- "Beautiful"
- "Confident"
- "Bumaye"
- "Goose Bumps"
- "Hotline Bling" (Cover)
- "Maria"
- "Oh Na Na Na"
- "Selfie"
- "Ngoma"
