= Varsity Hockey (South Africa) =

University field hockey competition

- Sport: Field Hockey
- Founded: 2013
- Owner: Varsity Sports
- No. of teams: 8
- Country: South Africa
- Website: varsitysportssa.com/hockey/

Varsity Hockey is a South African university field hockey competition. It is one of seven sports in the Varsity Sports series. The annual tournament involves the top hockey playing universities in the country, which belong to the University Sports Company. The tournament is run by Varsity Sports South Africa, and is endorsed by the South African Hockey Association and University Sport South Africa.

== Participating teams ==
As of 2014, 8 different teams have competed in the Varsity Hockey tournament:

Varsity Hockey
Team Name	University
Maties	Stellenbosch University
NMMU Madibaz	Nelson Mandela Metropolitan University
NWU Mafikeng	North-West University
UCT Ikey	University of Cape Town
UFS Kovsies	University of the Free State
UJ	University of Johannesburg
UP-Tuks	University of Pretoria
Wits	University of the Witwatersrand

== Results ==
=== Men ===
Year	Host	Final			Third place match			Number of teams
Year	Host	Winner	Score	Runner-up	Third place	Score	Fourth place	Number of teams
2014	WITS University	UJ	2(2)-2(0) p.s.o.	Maties	Tuks	2-0	Kovsie	8
2016	University of Johannesburg	UJ	4-2	Tuks		Round-robin		8
2018; Details	WITS University; University of Pretoria	Tuks	5-0	Maties	Wits	Round-robin	NWU	8
2022; Details	University of Pretoria	Tuks	4–3	Wits	Maties	5–3	UJ	4

=== Women ===
Year	Host	Final			Third place match			Number of teams
Year	Host	Winner	Score	Runner-up	Third place	Score	Fourth place	Number of teams
2013	North-West University, Potchefstroom	Maties	1-0	NWU Pukke	Kovsie	1-0	Tuks	8
2015	North-West University, Potchefstroom	UJ	3-0	Kovsie		Round-robin		8
2017	Stellenbosch University	Tuks	1-0	Maties		Round-robin		8
2019; Details	University of Cape Town, Cape Town; North-West University, Potchefstroom	NWU Pukke	0(2) - 0(1) p.s.o.	Maties	Kovsie	Round-robin	Tuks	8
2022; Details	University of Pretoria	Tuks	4–3	Maties	NWU Pukke	6–0	Kovsie	4

=== Performances by university ===
==== Men ====
Team	Titles	Runners-up	Third-place	Fourth-place
Tuks	2 (2018, 2022*)	1 (2016)	1 (2014)	
UJ	2 (2014, 2016)		1 (2022)	
Maties		2 (2014, 2018)	1 (2022)	
Wits		1 (2022)	1 (2018)	
Kovsie				1 (2014)
NWU				1 (2018)

==== Women ====
Team	Titles	Runners-up	Third-place	Fourth-place
Tuks	2 (2017, 2022*)			2 (2013, 2019)
Maties	1 (2013)	3 (2017*, 2019, 2022)		
UJ	1 (2015)			
Kovsie		1 (2015)	2 (2013, 2019)	1 (2022)
NWU Pukke			1 (2022)	

== See also ==
- InterVarsity Hockey
