= Lazarus Tembo =

Zambian musician

- Citizenship: Zambia
- Occupation: Singer

Lazarus Tembo was one of Zambia's most popular singers. He was born in the Eastern Province of Zambia, went blind at the age of eight, and eventually, under President Kaunda, became Zambia's Junior Minister of Culture.

A Zambian folk music award was named after him. He also supported the work of the Lusaka Nutrition Group, an organisation which was a precursor to the work of Makeni Ecumenical Centre, before 1971.

== Selected Songs ==
1. Mtandezeni
2. Baby Feeding Song
3. Ulwimbo Lwakulisho Mwana
4. Nyimbo Ya Podwetsa Mwana
5. Malambo
6. Jeni
7. Kola
8. Chitukuko Na Mowa
9. Ukwati Ndi M'tima
10. Ndayenda yenda
11. Umukolwe kokoliko
12. Gozha Ng'ombe
13. Njala
14. Wokondedwa
15. Kaleya
