= Amayenge =

Band

Amayenge is a popular Zambian music group.

== Background ==
Started by Chris Chali in 1978 in Choma, the band was originally called Crossbones, one of many Zambian acts that had sprung up to do gigs based on rock. Later the band became known as the New Crossbones, after a change in direction, sponsorship and management. The musical style of the group is called kalindula, a distinctive Zambian popular style with traditional African roots. Chali died 30 May 2003, but the band has continued with Fraser Chilembo as their leader. Amayenge has received worldwide attention from WOMAD in London to Asia and the Americas.

In February 2007, they played a Valentine's Day show at Mumana Pleasure Resort.

== Band Members ==
- Chris Chali (Vocalist), Deceased in 2003
- Alice Chali (Vocalist/Dancer)
- Obert Chali (Vocalist/Dancer)
- Emmanuel Kayeji (Dancer/Vocalist)
- Bester Mudenda (Dancer/Vocalist)
- Jonathan Nthanga (Lead Guitar)
- Mathews Mulenga (Rhythm Guitar)
- Joseph Mwamba (Drums)
- Davy Muthali (Percussionist)
- Chabala Chitambo (Percussionist)
- Donald Njovu (Percussionist)
- Eddy Moto (Sound Engineer)
- Sam Chiluba (Bass)
- Fraser Chilembo - Band Manager

== Discography ==
- 1979. Ukuilondola. (meaning to introduce oneself). First single
- 1989. Amayenge. Amayenge. Brentford, Middlesex, England: Mondeca Records. LP recording
- 1991. Phone. Amayenge (Musical group). Amayenge. Ndola, Zambia: Teal Records. 1 sound cassette : analog.
- 2001. Amayenge, Part 1. Amayenge (Musical group). Lusaka, Zambia: Mondo Music Corp. Compact disc.
- 2004. Dailesi. - the last album recorded by Chris Chali before his death.
- 2005. Mangoma Kulila ('The drums play')

The band is also included on the following recordings:

- 1983, 2004. Zambush, Vol. 1 - Zambian hits from the '80s. Utrecht, the Netherlands: SWP Records. Compact disc.
- 1989. Zambiance. Compact disc.
- 2001 - Zambian Legends
- 2002. Sounds of Zambia, Volume 3. Lusaka, Zambia: Mondo Music Corp. Compact disc.

== Awards ==
- 1993 - Best Band of the year at the Zambia International Trade Fair Show
- 2000's - Ngoma Awards Festival, Best Band award (Received the award 7 Times)
- 2007 - Brath Awards, Best Kalindula Band

== See also ==
- List of African musicians
