= Mashombe Blue Jeans =

- Origin: Livingstone, Zambia
- Genres: Kalindula
- Years active: 2000 – present

Mashombe Blue Jeans is one of a number of kalindula ensembles from the Southern Province of Zambia. Like other kalindula groups, they sing and play a style of Zambian music that blends traditional with modern musical materials.

Their reputation has received a considerable boost from their association with the Tonga Music Festival sponsored by Chikuni Radio Station and they have released a number of cassettes as a result of their collaboration with the station. Like other popular Zambian groups, Mashombe Blue Jeans has also made appearances at the Ngoma Music Awards, Zambia's main music award ceremony.

The Livingstone-based group has received news coverage in almost all Zambia's national newspapers and even received mention in the National Assembly of Zambia in 2004.
