= Zululand =

Map of various possible definitions of Zululand or KwaZulu: The Zulu Kingdom in 1879. The KwaZulu Bantustan in 1994. The Zululand District Municipality in 2016. The KwaZulu-Natal Province in 2016. The Anglican Church's Diocese of Zululand in 2025. The area where the Zulu language is dominant (in 2011). The area where the Zulu language is significant (in 2011).

Zululand (Zulu: KwaZulu) may refer to:

- Zulu Kingdom (1818–1897)
- KwaZulu, a Bantustan in South Africa (1981–1994)
- KwaZulu-Natal, a province of the Republic of South Africa
- Zululand District Municipality of KwaZulu-Natal, South Africa
- Diocese of Zululand, a diocese of the Anglican Church of Southern Africa

== See also ==
- Amazulu (disambiguation)
- Zulu (disambiguation)
