= Bradley Sherwood =

South African field hockey player (born 1999)

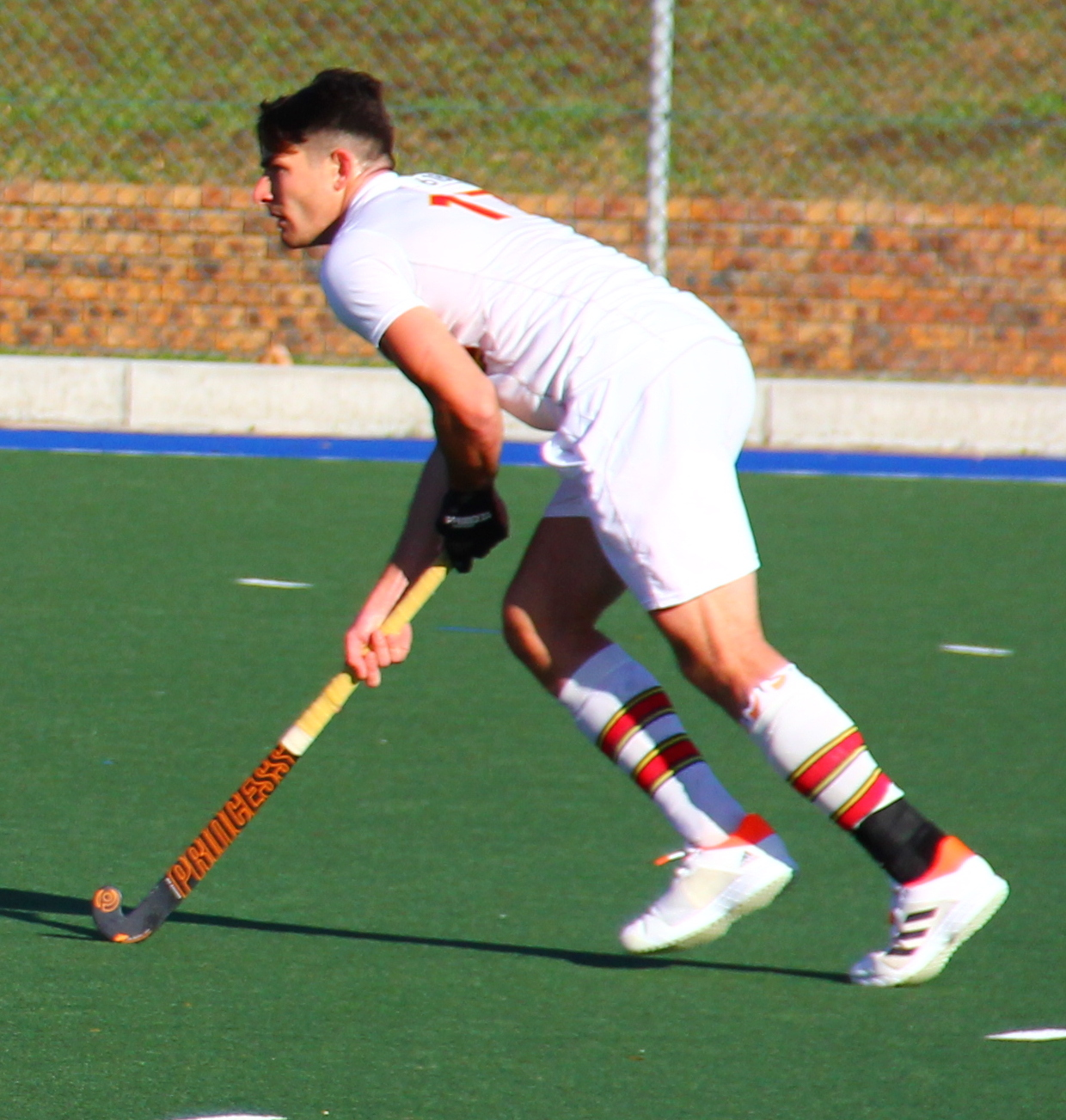
- USSA Tournament A Section Tuks v Madibaz, 5 July 2022

Personal information
- Born: 28 May 1999 (age 27)

Sport
- Sport: Field hockey
- Club: Oxted
Senior career
Years	Team	Caps	Goals
2018–2022	Tuks	-	-
National team
Years	Team	Caps	Goals
2022–present	South Africa	42	(10)
Medal record
Africa Cup of Nations
Gold medal – first place	2022 Accra

Bradley Sherwood (born 28 May 1999) is a South African field hockey player. He will compete in the 2024 Summer Olympics.

== International career ==
He made his senior South Africa debut v Netherlands, in the FIH Pro League on 8 February 2022.

== Personal life ==
He went to Maritzburg College and University of Pretoria.

== Honours ==
- 2022 Men's Varsity Hockey - Best player
