= 2019 Women's Varsity Hockey (South Africa) =

Tournament details
- Dates: 3 May 2019–20 May 2019
- Venue(s): UCT Hockey; NWU Astro

Final positions
- Champions: NWU
- Runner-up: Maties
- Third place: Tuks

Tournament statistics
- Matches played: 33
- Goals scored: 193 (5.85 per match)
- Top scorer: Simoné Gouws (Kovsie) (14 goals)
- Best player: Onthatile Zulu (Tuks)

The 2019 Women's Hockey Varsity Hockey will be the 9th edition of the Varsity Hockey, the annual tournament women's field hockey championship of South Africa.

In addition to the Power Play rule seen in previous seasons of Varsity Hockey, whereby each team can select to implement a two-minute period where goals count two and the opposition must bench two players, field goals will now count two.

== Venues ==
Following is a list of all venues and host cities.

2019 Women's Varsity Hockey (South Africa) is located in South Africa	Cape Town	Potchefstroom
2019 Women's Varsity Hockey (South Africa) is located in South Africa	UCT Hockey	NWU Astro

== Results ==
=== Preliminary round ===
Pos	Team	Pld	W	OTW	OTL	L	GF	GA	GD	Pts	Qualification
1	Maties	7	5	0	1	1	27	6	+21	16	Semi-Final
2	NWU (H)	7	5	0	0	2	21	11	+10	15	Semi-Final
3	Kovsie	7	4	1	0	2	40	20	+20	14	Semi-Final
4	Tuks	7	4	0	0	3	27	16	+11	12	Semi-Final
5	UJ (E)	7	3	1	1	2	12	16	−4	12	
6	Ikeys	7	3	0	1	3	19	21	−2	10	
7	WITS	7	1	1	0	5	12	24	−12	5	
8	Madibaz	7	0	0	0	7	9	54	−45	0	

Source: SA Hockey
(E) Eliminated; (H) Host

=== Fixtures ===
All times are local (UTC+2).

3 May 2019
13:30

Maties	2-0	Tuks
Louwrens 39'	Report

UCT

3 May 2019
15:15

UJ	1-1	Kovsie
Kruger 47'	Report	Louw 24'
Penalties
Paton (penalty shoot-out missed); Hawker (penalty shoot-out scored); Kruger (penalty shoot-out scored); Gerber (penalty shoot-out missed); Harmse (penalty shoot-out scored); Hawker (penalty shoot-out missed); Paton (penalty shoot-out missed)	3-4	(penalty shoot-out scored) Hartel; (penalty shoot-out missed) Simmons; (penalty shoot-out missed) Gouws; (penalty shoot-out scored) Louw; (penalty shoot-out scored) Louw; (penalty shoot-out missed) Louw; (penalty shoot-out scored) Gouws

UCT

3 May 2019
17:00

Madibaz	2-6	NWU
Gwata 34'	Report	Ferreira 26'; Minnaar 42', 58'

UCT

3 May 2019
18:45

Ikeys	5-1	Wits
Leader 20'; Koenig 38'; Maake 45'	Report	Janse van Vuren 40'

UCT

4 May 2019
13:30

Kovsie	2-4	Maties
Louw 9'	Report	Cullinan 4'; Pote 37', 54'; Phillips 45'

UCT

4 May 2019
15:15

Wits	1-4	NWU
Janse van Vuren 17'	Report	Pretorius 44', 48'; Laubscher 50'

UCT

4 May 2019
17:00

Tuks	3-4	UJ
Zulu 8'; Esteves 24', 32'	Report	Terblanche 9'; Coopoosamy 22'

UCT

4 May 2019
18:45

Ikeys	5-4	Madibaz
Hutchinson 35'; Dollie 51'; Leader 54'}	Report	Sissing 32'; Gouws 56'

UCT

5 May 2019
13:30

Maties	7-0	UJ
Kotze 3'; Louwrens 37'; Pote 40'; Hendricks 41'	Report

UCT

5 May 2019
15:15

Madibaz	0-7	Wits
	Report	Janse van Vuren 24'; Thenjwayo 44'; Dykman 51'; Datnow 52'

UCT

5 May 2019
17:00

NWU	1-4	Kovsie
De Bruyn-Smith 23'	Report	Botha 11'; Gouws 29'

UCT

5 May 2019
18:45

Ikeys	4-2	Tuks
Vercelotti 50'; Koenig 52'	Report	Marokoane 46'

UCT

6 May 2019
12:00

Kovsie	16-2	Madibaz
Gouws 7', 22'; Jacobs 32'; Louw 36', 40'; Ngoetjane 42'; Botha 48'; Erasmus 60'	Report	van Goeverden 40'

UCT

6 May 2019
13:45

NWU	0-3	Tuks
Jacobs 41'; Esteves 52'	Report

UCT

6 May 2019
17:00

Wits	1-2	UJ
Veto 23'	Report	Hawker 27'

UCT

6 May 2019
18:45

Ikeys	0-2	Maties
	Report	Phillips 58'

UCT

10 May 2019
13:30

Kovsie	7-0	Wits
Gouws 36'; Ralikontsane 40'; Louw 55'	Report

NWU Astro

10 May 2019
15:15

Ikeys	2-2	UJ
Vercelotti 60'	Report	May 43'
Penalties
Koenig (penalty shoot-out scored); Hutchinson (penalty shoot-out missed); Ewing (penalty shoot-out missed); Tullis (penalty shoot-out missed); Winter (penalty shoot-out missed)	1-2	(penalty shoot-out scored) Terblanche; (penalty shoot-out scored) Nkoe; (penalty shoot-out missed) Hawker; (penalty shoot-out missed) Gerber

NWU Astro

10 May 2019
17:00

Tuks	9-0	Madibaz
Marais 18', 38', 52', 55'; Esteves 44'	Report

NWU Astro

10 May 2019
18:45

NWU	2-1	Maties
Silent 28'	Report	Phillips 39'

NWU Astro

11 May 2019
12:30

UJ	3-0	Madibaz
Paton 47'; Kriel 55'	Report

NWU Astro

11 May 2019
14:15

Kovsie	6-7	Tuks
Gouws 3', 35'; Louw 46', 48'	Report	Anderson 11'; Esteves 13'; Marokoane 14'; Marais 33', 37'

NWU Astro

11 May 2019
16:00

Wits	2-2	Maties
Thenjwayo 38'	Report	Botha 40'
Penalties
Bone (penalty shoot-out scored); Quinn (penalty shoot-out missed); Dykman (penalty shoot-out scored); Thenjwayo (penalty shoot-out missed); Veto (penalty shoot-out scored)	2-3	(penalty shoot-out scored) Pote; (penalty shoot-out missed) Bartsch; (penalty shoot-out scored) Botha; (penalty shoot-out missed) Kaps; (penalty shoot-out missed) Stevens

NWU Astro

11 May 2019
17:45

NWU	6-0	Ikeys
Maddocks 32'; Silent 33'; Ledwaba 53'	Report

NWU Astro

12 May 2019
12:00

Kovsie	3-4	Ikeys
Louw 11'; Jacobs 40'; Motsa 44'	Report	Leader 8'; Koenig 20'

NWU Astro

12 May 2019
13:45

Maties	7-0	Madibaz
Kaps 13'; Botha 43'; Southgate 54'; Kotze 60'	Report

NWU Astro

12 May 2019
17:00

Wits	0-3	Tuks
	Report	Marokoane 41'; Marais 58'

NWU Astro

12 May 2019
18:45

NWU	2-0	UJ
Pretorius 36', 38'	Reports

NWU Astro

=== Seven place game ===
13 May 2019
13:30

Wits	3-2	Madibaz
Janse van Vuren 42'; Datnow 48'	Report	Gouws 51'

NWU Astro

=== Fifth place game ===
13 May 2019
15:15

UJ	0-1	Ikeys
	Report	Leader 18'

NWU Astro

=== Knockout stage ===
Semi-finals
13 May - NWU Astro
Maties	7
Tuks	5
13 May – NWU Astro
Kovsie	4
NWU	5

Final
20 May – NWU Astro
Maties	0(1)
NWU	0(2)

=== Semi-finals ===
13 May 2019
17:00

Maties	7-5	Tuks
Louwrens 2', 17'; Hendricks 21'; Botha 42'	Report	Esteves 41'; Zulu 42'; Thomas 48'

NWU Astro

13 May 2019
18:45

Kovsie	4-5	NWU
Ralikontsane 26', 55'	Report	Du Preez 15'; Pretorius 19', 60'

NWU Astro

=== Final ===
20 May 2019
18:45

Maties	0-0	NWU
	Report
Penalties
Pote (penalty shoot-out missed); Botha (penalty shoot-out missed); Phillips (penalty shoot-out scored); Bartsch (penalty shoot-out missed); Stevens (penalty shoot-out missed)	1-2	(penalty shoot-out scored) Adams; (penalty shoot-out missed) Pretorius; (penalty shoot-out missed) Laubscher; (penalty shoot-out scored) Smit

NWU Astro

== Final standings ==
Pos	Team
1	NWU (H)
2	Maties
3	Kovsie
4	Tuks
5	Ikeys
6	UJ
7	WITS
8	Madibaz

Source: SA Hockey
(H) Host

== Goalscorers ==
There have been 193 goals scored in 33 matches, for an average of 5.85 goals per match.

14 goals

- Simoné Gouws (Kovsie)

12 goals

- Antonet Louw (Kovsie)

10 goals

- Marizen Marais (Tuks)

8 goals

- Lee-Ann Louwrens (Maties)

7 goals

- Natalie Esteves (Tuks)
- Carli Pretorius (NWU)

6 goals

- Nicole Koenig (Ikeys)
- Maikemisetso Marokoane (Tuks)
- Aimee-Leigh Pote (Maties)

5 goals

- Refilwe Ralikontsane (Kovsie)

4 goals

- Lezaan Janse van Vuren (Wits)
- Andrea Leader (Ikeys)
- Stephanie Botha (Maties)
- Paige Phillips (Maties)
- Casey-Jean Botha (Kovsie)
- Ashleigh Datnow (Wits)
- Caitlin Gouws (Madibaz)
- Ammaarah Hendricks (Maties)
- Lizanne Jacobs (Kovsie)
- Kelsey Minnaar (NWU)
- Candice Silent (NWU)
- Nompilo Thenjwayo (Wits)
- Francesca Vercelotti (Ikeys)

3 goals

- Lida Kotze (Maties)
- Onthatile Zulu (Tuks)

2 goals

- Megan Anderson (Tuks)
- Dinisha Coopoosamy (UJ)
- Aaliah Dollie (Ikeys)
- Courtney du Preez (NWU)
- Michelle Dykman (Wits)
- Kia-Leigh Erasmus (Kovsie)
- Chante Ferreira (NWU)
- Kanyisa Gwata (Madibaz)
- Lisa Hawker (UJ)
- Jess Hutchinson (Ikeys)
- Aneme Jacobs (Tuks)
- Rebecca Kaps (Maties)
- Tenika Kriel (UJ)
- Sare Laubscher (NWU)
- Sherine Ledwaba (NWU)
- Modjadji Maake (Ikeys)
- Charné Maddocks (NWU)
- Thato May (UJ)
- Michelle Ngoetjane (Kovsie)
- Zhanique Sissing (Madibaz)
- Jamie Southgate (Maties)
- Gabriella Terblanche (UJ)
- Ashleigh Thomas (Tuks)
- Caitlin van Goeverden (Madibaz)

1 goal

- Lenta Cullinan (Maties)
- Jessica De Bruyn-Smith (NWU)
- Jivanka Kruger (UJ)
- S'Thabile Motsa (Kovsie)
- Kristen Paton (UJ)
- Nomnikelo Veto (Wits)

Source: SAHA

== Awards ==
The following awards were given at the conclusion of the tournament.

Player of the tournament	Goalkeeper of the tournament	Top goalscorer
Onthatile Zulu (Tuks)		Simoné Gouws (Kovsie)
