= Onthatile Zulu =

South African field hockey player

Personal information
- Full name: Onthatile Owethu Zulu
- Born: 14 March 2000 (age 26) Pretoria, South Africa

Sport
- Sport: Field hockey
- Position: Midfield
- Club: WPCC
Senior career
Years	Team	Caps	Goals
2019-2022	Tuks	9	-
2018-2022	Northern Blues	-	-
National team
Years	Team	Caps	Goals
2019–	South Africa	14	(0)
2022	South Africa U21	5	(0)
Medal record
Women's field hockey
Representing South Africa
Africa Cup of Nations
Gold medal – first place	2025 Ismailia

Onthatile 'Thati' Owethu Zulu (born 14 March 2000) is a field hockey player from South Africa. In 2020, she was an athlete at the Summer Olympics.

== Personal life ==
Onthatile Zulu was born and raised in Pretoria.

== Career ==
=== National team ===
Zulu made her senior international debut for South Africa in 2019, during a qualifying event for the 2020 Summer Olympics in Stellenbosch.

Following a string of good performances in the lead up to selection, Zulu was named in the squad for the 2020 Summer Olympics in Tokyo. She will make her Olympic debut on 24 July 2021, in the Pool A match against Ireland.

Christa Ramasimong and her are the co-captains of the South Africa U21 team to compete in the FIH Women's Junior World Cup.

== Honours ==
=== Club ===
University of Pretoria

- Varsity Hockey 2019: FNB Player of the Tournament Award
