= Ballad Zulu =

- Born: November 17, 1968 (age 57)
- Citizenship: Zambia
- Occupation: Singer

Andrew Ballad Mutale Zulu (Ballad Zulu) (born on 17 November 1968) is a Zambian singer, multi-instrumentalist, songwriter, and economist. His music career is punctuated by long periods of silence. He has also developed a reputation of being a reclusive artiste, rarely giving interviews and rarely performing live. His music style has been described as a fusion of traditional Zambian music, pop, afro beat and folk. His first hit single in Zambia was "Cook On (Woman of Truth)" in 1989 from Teal record company. His other hits are "Welako" (1994), "Step Mother" (2002), and "Tipange Banja" (2005). His new album "Experience" was released on January 10, 2008.
