= Maiko Zulu =

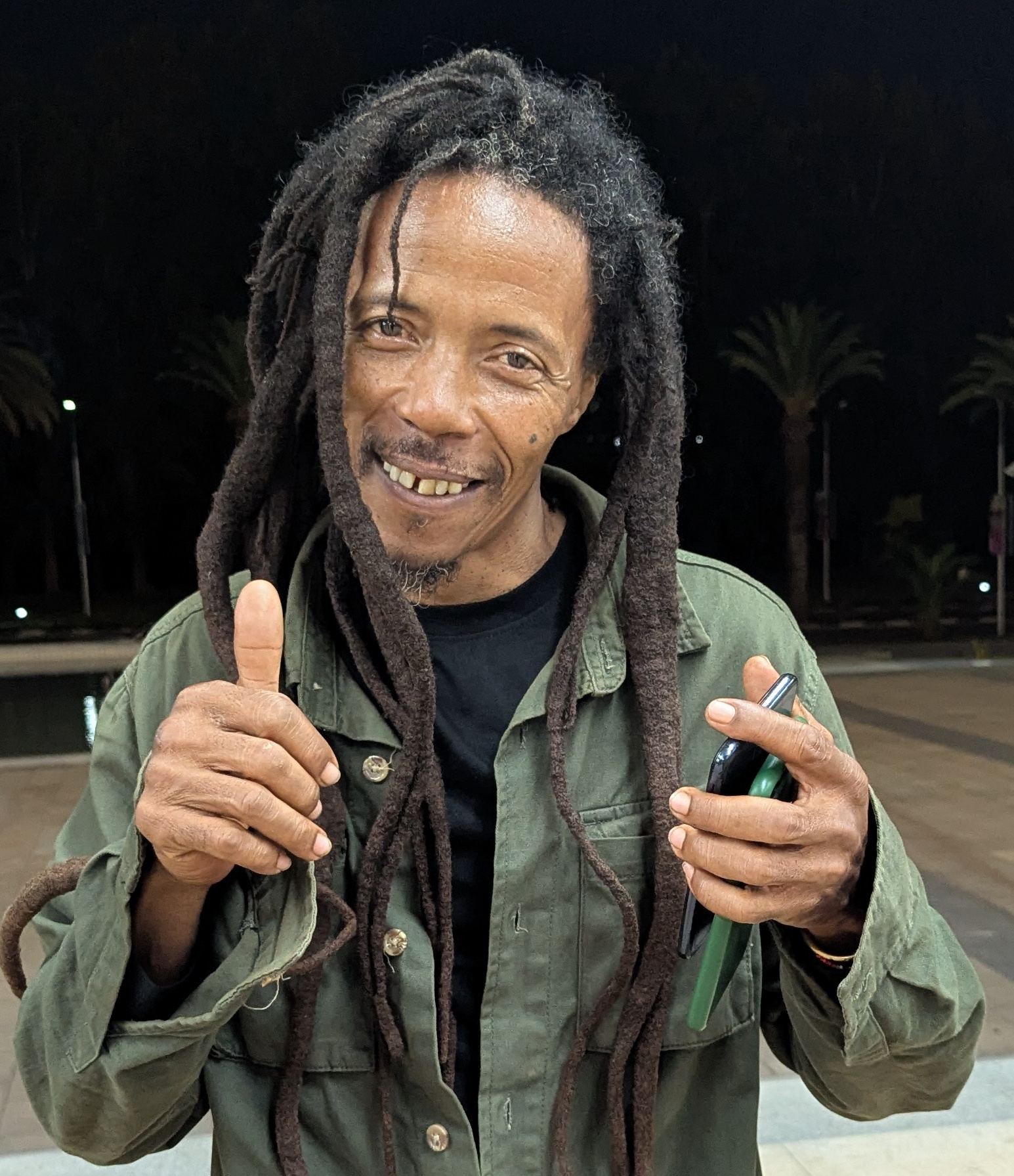
- Maiko at the 25th edition of DRIF in May 2025

Background information
- Genres: Reggae
- Occupations: Singer, producer, songwriter, MUVI Tv studio manager
- Years active: 1996–present

Maiko Zulu is a Zambian reggae musician, human rights activist and a recognized International labour organisation child ambassador to Zambia. His work both in the music industry and human rights arena is well known both locally and internationally.

== Early life ==
Maiko was born in Livingstone which is a tourist capital city of Zambia. He grew up on his family owned farm. Maiko moved to Lusaka, the capital city of Zambia at the age of six according to his biography on Maiko Zulu website. It was while in Lusaka that maiko began his singing career. He entered the music industry with a stage name called St. Michael, a name he later changed. According to Times of Zambia newspaper interview with Zulu, Zulu said that he changed his name "to maintain his African origin hence, adoption of the local spelling of Maiko".

== Music career ==
Maiko is a songwriter, musician and a producer. His songs include "Mad President", a song which the state owned TV Broadcaster refused to play on their station. Maiko currently also works as a Studio manager at Muvi TV studios in Lusaka.

== Discography ==
1. In the Ghetto (2001)
2. Pressure (2003)
3. Mad President (2006)
4. Monk Square Revolution (2008)

== Community work ==
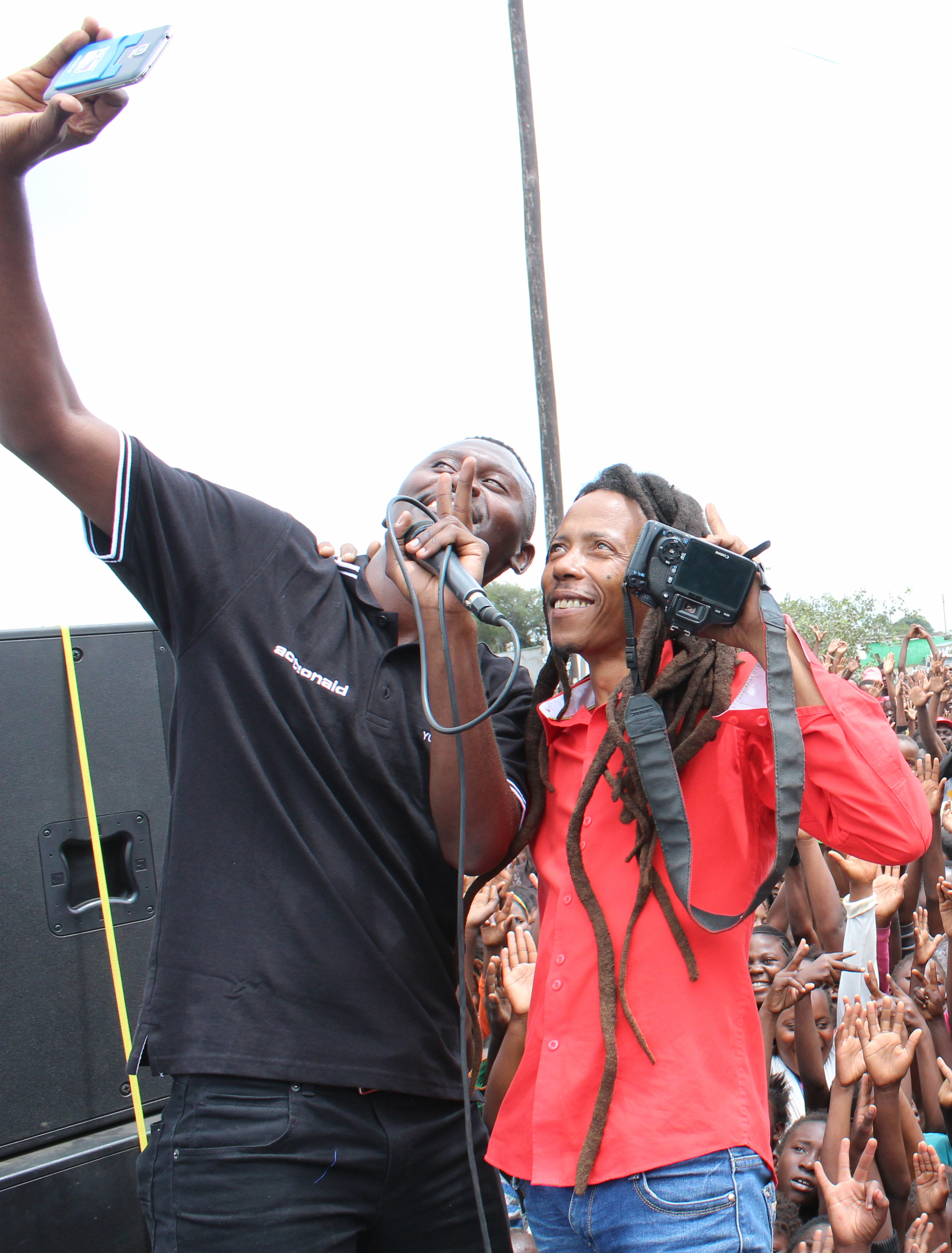
Maiko Zulu with B'Flow in 2017

Maiko is credited for promoting human rights in Zambia. He received an award for this work from the International Labour Organization. He speaks on behalf of the poor, especially children. He is also an outspoken critic of politicians. He recently took part in a protest against the Zambian ruling political parts' continued harassment of Journalists. He has also raised money and donated basic necessity goods to prisons.
