= Roberto (musician) =

- Born: Robert Banda; December 17, 1985 (age 40); Chipata, Zambia
- Other names: Superstar; Roberto Zambia
- Occupations: Musician; songwriter; producer
- Relatives: General Ozzy (Brother)
- Musical career
- Genres: Hip hop; Afro-pop; R&B
- Instruments: Piano; Flute
- Years active: 2007–present
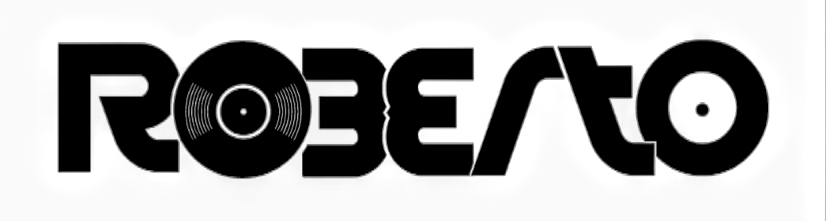

Robert Chindamba Banda (born December 17, 1985), better known by his stage name Roberto is a Zambian artist, singer and songwriter.

== Early life and career ==
Roberto was born on December 17, 1985, in Chipata to Killion Banda and E.J Banda. His interest in music developed at a very young age as his parents could play musical instruments and his elder brother, David Banda (General Ozzy) is said to be one of the people that inspired him to pick up a career in music.

To date, Roberto has released a total of 5 albums and an EP titled 'Journey To The East'. He has worked with local and international artists. He has worked with the likes of Patoranking, Grammy nominated Eddy Kenzo, Vanessa Mdee and Butera Knowless among others.

== Discography ==
=== Studio albums ===
List of studio albums with selected details
Title	Details
Roberto	Released: 2007; Formats: CD
Akasuba	Released: 2009; Formats: CD
My Name Is...	Released: 2012; Formats: CD
Amarulah	Released: 2015; Formats: Digital download
Superstar	Released: 2017; Formats: Digital download

=== EP(s) ===
List of EP(s) with selected details
Title	Details
Journey To The East	Released: 2021; Formats: Digital download

=== Singles ===
Title	Year	Album
"Amarulah"	2015	Amarulah
"Amarulah Remix" (feat. Patoranking)	2015	Amarulah
"Vitamin U" (feat. Vanessa Mdee)		
"Te Amo" (feat. Butera Knowless)		
"Am gon love her"	2015	
"Into You"	2018	Superstar
"My Baby" (feat. Harmonize)	2022	
"Tudigida" (feat. Eddy Kenzo)	2023	

== Awards and nominations ==
Year	Award	Category	Result	Re.
2015	African Muzik Magazine Awards (AFRIMMA)	Best Male Southern Africa	Nominated	
2016	Zambia Music Awards	Song Of The Year	Won	
2016	Namibia Annual Music Awards (NAMA)	Pan African Artiste of The Year	Won	
2017	Kwacha Music Awards	Best International Achievement	Won	
2018	HiPipo Music Awards	Best Song in Southern Africa	Won	
2019	HiPipo Music Awards	Best RnB Maestro (Africa)	Won	
