= Witch (Zamrock band) =

Zambian rock band

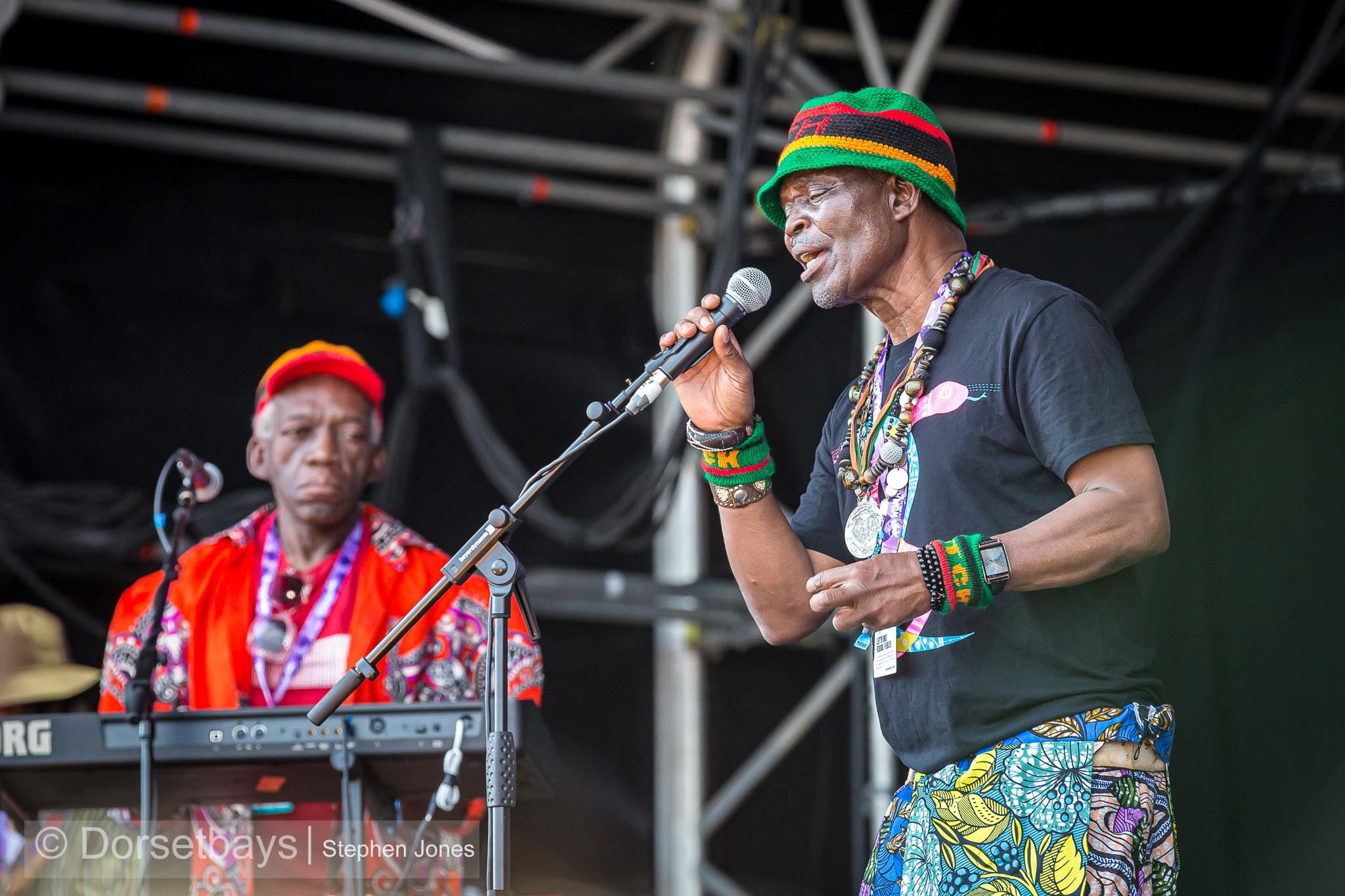
- Witch at WOMAD (2024). Left: Patrick Mwondela Right: Emanyeo "Jagari" Chanda

Background information
- Origin: Kitwe, Copperbelt, Zambia
- Genres: Zamrock; blues-rock; garage rock; psychedelic rock
- Years active: 1972–1984; 2011–present
- Labels: Now-Again, Partisan, Zambezi, Zambia Music Parlour, Shadoks Music, Q.D.K. Media, Shed, Invisible City
- Members: Emanyeo "Jagari" Chanda; Patrick Mwondela; Jacco Gardner; Nico Mauskoviç; Stefan Lilov; JJ Whitefield
- Past members: John "Music" Muma; Gideon "Giddy King" Mulenga; Boyd "Star MacBoyd" Sinkala; Chris "Kims" Mbewe; Paul "Jones" Mumba; Patrick Chisembele; Peter Lungu; Shaddick Bwalya; Emmanuel Makulu; Christine Jackson
- Website: weintendtocausehavoc.com

Witch (often stylized as WITCH or W.I.T.C.H.) are a Zamrock band formed in the 1970s. Widely seen as the most popular Zambian band of the 1970s, WITCH (a backronym for "We Intend To Cause Havoc"), was headed by lead vocalist Emanuel "Jagari" Chanda. The band formed during Zambia's post-independence golden days, but by the late 1970s, economic collapse and increasing government authoritarianism saw WITCH, like most Zamrock bands, fading away. The band was revived in 2012 after reissues of their records became popular abroad.

== History ==
WITCH formed during Zambia's post-independence golden days, but by the late 1970s, economic collapse and increasing government authoritarianism saw WITCH—like most Zamrock bands, playing daytime shows to avoid curfews—fading away. This prompted Jagari to leave the band and pursue his career as a teacher.

After Jagari's departure, WITCH recruited Patrick Chisembele and Christine Jackson as lead vocalists. During this time, the band moved away from rock, and towards disco music. After the departure of Patrick Chisembele and Christine Jackson, WITCH's sound again shifted, now to further incorporate elements of Zambian music. This later iteration, led by Chris Mbewe, largely played kalindula music, exemplified in tracks from this era such as "Janet" and "Nazingwa".

After the mid-1980s, the band faded into obscurity and stopped playing live until 2012, when Chanda was invited to the US to revive the band. As of 2013, WITCH are touring again, with the new lineup including Jagari, alongside new members from the Netherlands, Germany, and Switzerland. The band's previous discography has also been re-released digitally and on vinyl. Since 2006, the group's music has been featured on several compilation albums curated by international tastemakers including Rolling Stone, Rough Trade, and Now-Again Records; Now-Again has included WITCH on multiple releases including the popular compilation Welcome to Zamrock!.

In 2023, the band released the album Zango, their first studio album in nearly 40 years. The band released the album Sogolo in June 2025.

== Band members ==
Years are approximate and based on album release dates.

=== Current (2014) members ===
- Emanyeo "Jagari" Chanda – lead vocals (1972–1976, 2012– )
- Patrick Mwondela – keyboards (1980–1984, 2012– )
- Nico Mauskoviç - drums, percussion
- Stefan Lilov - guitar
- JJ Whitefield - guitar

=== Past members ===
- Chris "Kims" Mbewe – lead guitar, vocals (1972–1984)
- Gideon "Giddy King" Mulenga – bass guitar (1972–1984)
- Boidi "Star MacBoyd" Sinkala – drums, vocals (1972–1977)
- John "Music" Muma – rhythm guitar, vocals (1972–1975, 1977)
- Paul "Jones" Mumba – keyboards, drums (1972–1974)
- Christine Jackson – vocals (1980)
- Peter Lungu – drums (1980–1984)
- Shaddick Bwalya – vocals, percussion (1980–1984)
- Emmanuel Makulu – guitar (1980)
- Stanford Tembo – vocals (1980)
- Patrick Chisembele – lead vocals (1984)
- Jacco Gardner - bass (2020-2025)

Other musicians credited on WITCH's release include keyboardists Cosmos Zani and Slim Ali, percussionist Alex Kunda, and singers A. Rusike and R. Miller. The brass band Real Sound Horns appears on both of the band's 1980s releases. For the albums Zango and Sogolo, WITCH collaborated with Zambian singers Hanna Tembo and Theresa Ng'ambi.

== Discography ==
Credits adapted from Discogs. Now-Again reissued information adapted from Bandcamp.

=== Studio albums ===
- Introduction (1972; reissued 2011)
- In the Past (1974; reissued 2012)
- Lazy Bones!! (1975; reissued 2012)
- Lukombo Vibes (1976; reissued 2012)
- WITCH (1977; reissued 2024)
- Movin' On (1980; reissued 2015, 2024)
- Kuomboka (1984; reissued 2015, 2024)
- Zango (2023)
- Sogolo (2025)

=== Compilations ===
- We Intend to Cause Havoc! (Now-Again, 2011)
- Fool's Ride (2025)
