= NWU Astro =

Field hockey stadium in North-West University, Potchefstroom, South Africa

- Interactive map of NWU Astro
- Address: North-West University; Potchefstroom; South Africa
- Coordinates: 26.68352°S 27.09678°E
- Surface: Astroturf

Tenant
- North-West University

NWU Astro, known as the NWU-PUK Astro, is a field hockey stadium in North-West University, Potchefstroom, North West, South Africa.

In the past, the stadium has hosted the following major tournaments:

- 2022 Women's FIH Hockey Junior World Cup
- Varsity Hockey in 2013, 2015, 2019
- 2021–22 Men's FIH Pro League
- 2022 Men's FIH Hockey Nations Cup
