= Zamrock =

Music genre and scene centered in Southern Africa

- Stylistic origins: Zambian; psychedelic rock; garage rock; hard rock; blues; funk
- Cultural origins: Late 1960s - Early 1970s, Zambia

Zamrock is a music genre and scene that emerged in Zambia during the early 1970s. It has been described as a fusion of traditional African music and psychedelic rock, garage rock, hard rock, blues and funk, taking influence from popular bands like Black Sabbath, Blue Cheer, the Rolling Stones, Deep Purple, and Cream.

Rock musician Rikki Ililonga and his band Musi-O-Tunya are widely regarded as the inventors of this style of music. Other notable artists include WITCH, The Peace, Amanaz, Chrissy "Zebby" Tembo, and Paul Ngozi and his Ngozi Family.

Though it is no longer as popular in the country as it once was due to Zambia's economic difficulties in the late 1970s, Zamrock has seen a recent resurgence, led by former WITCH member Emmanuel Chanda, better known as Jagari.

== History ==
Zamrock's roots can be traced back to the 1950s, with northern singers from the Copperbelt Province such as Stephen Tsotsi Kasumali, William Mapulanga, and John Lushi. Zamrock as a musical movement came of age in the turbulent first decade after Zambia's independence from British colonialism, rising and falling in tandem with the country's economic success. Zambia's boom from its copper mines led to a bust when copper prices fell and the country was devastated by the AIDS epidemic of the 1980s.

After the country announced its independence in 1964, then-president Kenneth Kaunda introduced the slogan, "One Zambia, one nation" to promote unity. In order to celebrate the culture of the newly independent nation, Kaunda decreed that 95% of music played on radio stations had to be Zambian in origin. Since Western rock was popular in Africa, many Zamrock artists were inspired by bands that were popular in the West and adopted similar styles to those playing on British and American radios.

The rush to urbanization in mine-adjacent regions meant a variety of new artistic styles. The country's newfound wealth brought with it urban sensibilities and a surge in interest in electric guitar use. Zamrock player Paul Ngozi of the Ngozi Family is credited with creating the kalindula sound, a rhythmic pop music sound with fuzzy electric guitar leads centred around the bass guitar of the same name.

While the price of copper fell and Zambia's economy crashed, Zambia found itself surrounded by political turmoil in neighbouring states. This conflict led to a rise in anti-establishment messages in Zamrock music. When the country offered to shelter refugees, Zambia's power stations were bombed. Once-prosperous cities were at the mercy of blackouts and curfews. Musicians were reduced to playing unstable sets during daylight hours while their ticket prices became unaffordable for most.

The AIDS epidemic played a huge part in bringing Zamrock to an end. The disease began to spread in the 1980s and has continued to devastate the nation since. It is estimated that between 1.2 million and 1.3 million have died from AIDS in Zambia as of 2019. Every member of WITCH except Emanuel "Jagari" Chanda had died of AIDS by 2001.

Furthermore, the rise of musical piracy had a significant impact on Zamrock artists. Bootleggers would copy and sell Zambian artists' music, forcing them to leave the industry and find work in other fields after losing their primary source of income.

Despite these challenges, Zamrock has yet to completely disappear from the world of music. A resurgence of interest across the globe in recent years, including reissues in North America and the production of a documentary, has allowed some Zamrock performers to tour, perform, and record new material.

Jagari from WITCH is one of these artists who has managed to make a comeback. In the last 5 years since his return in 2017, he has performed in several European cities such as Moscow and Paris, something he never got the chance to do in his band's prime. He has also toured around the United States, and been awarded for his achievements by the Zambian National Arts Council.

== About the music ==
Because the peak of Zamrock music occurred during a period of social unrest, much of the music released at the time reflected the difficulties that people were facing. Sometimes referred to as an aggressive genre, it addressed contentious issues such as racism in Southern Africa all while still maintaining an exuberant feel.

== Definition ==
The term "Zamrock" refers to the combination of Western rock with the distinct style of African music. Zambian DJ Manessah Phiri is credited with the creation of the term.

Zamrock is heavily influenced by psychedelic rock and funk music, popular Western genres of the 1970s. It shares many features of these genres, most notably wah wah and fuzz.
