= Petersen Zagaze =

- Born: Mukubesa Mundia; September 28, 1982 (age 43); Lusaka, Zambia
- Other names: Petersen Zagaze; Zaga Man; One Zaga; Honorable Apostle 'Banda'; As a Tiger
- Occupations: singer; songwriter; Music Producer; record executive; politician; Humanitarian
- Years active: 2002–present
- Spouse: Divorced
- Children: 4
- Musical career
- Genres: Hip hop; Dancehall; Reggae; Afro Dancehall
- Instrument: Vocals
- Label: Zaga Lyfe Entertainment

Mukubesa Mundia (born September 28, 1982), better known by his stage name Petersen Zagaze is a Zambian Reggae and Afro Dancehall recording artist and record producer from Lusaka, Zambia. He initially gained major recognition after his third single in 2005 Munyaule. Petersen a holder of a Bachelor of Art's Degree in Public Administration is also the chief executive officer (CEO) of his own label imprint, Zaga Lyfe Entertainment, Octopus Media and 2016 Kora Awards Best Male Southern Africa Nominee.

== Music career ==
Petersen's music career started off in 2002 as a songwriter and released two songs Wasaina Fight, Nenze Na Pamela and Wind your body in 2003 and 2004. He then recorded his first album in 2005 and now has 6 albums plus a number of hit singles.

=== Early music career 2002–2004 ===
In 2002 Petersen entered Zambian music as a songwriter and backing vocalist for various artists in Zambia his first taste was after writing ‘goodnight’ for a group called Ba Crazy and he was then featured on two of the tracks in the group's album titled Goodnight.

In 2003 Petersen worked with Mondo Music Corp.’s Bob Mabege on his album Mr True and he also featured in Bob Mabege's hit single Poor Finishing

In 2004 he worked with 2 proud and wrote the song Nzabagwile. Petersen has written, composed and featured on Vobweleka bweleka and Ngayaposa Kukosa for Mwembe Muntu’s album,

=== 2005–present ===
In 2005 Petersen ventured for a solo career starting with his debut hit single ‘Munyaule’ which featured General Ozzy and later that year named his first album Munyaule.

In 2007 Petersen released a new album with producer Ben Blazer title Bobojani

In 2012 Petersen was working on his new album which was the much anticipated album titled Job 13 – 13 (which included songs like Amakwebo mu church, Oxygen featuring Shadaya Zaher, Bvuto La Fwaka & Munyaule Continuously) that was delayed to be released, but the further delays saw him releasing a 22-track compilation titled Stoga Compilation: Tiger Revolution, before the album drops.

In 2015 Petersen produced his fourth album King Solomon and also features Afunika, Flexville Marley and Nameless from Kenya. Songs like Kalukobo, Ba Zesko, Boma Ni Boma and Gile were favorites on this project.

In 2018 he produced, recorded and released his sixth' studio album titled Spartacus. Nifola 4 Pin, Ups and Down, Mbambo, Munyaule Pachi Corner, Mankwinya and many other songs composed this masterpiece.

The next and 7th album for 2022 is titled Apocalyto (Money and Morality). Bwana Ni Munthu Nae, Ma Stylo, Bude, Sample and many are songs building this lovely project.

=== Music and society ===
Petersen's reaction of politicians was not entirely unexpected. Pressure also came from some church leaders that took great exception to Munyaule, a song that out-rightly euphemised sex like no other musician has ever done in Zambia.

Petersen used the visibility Munyaule had brought him to highlight several injustices he saw in Zambian politics and the society it breeds.

Petersen did not spare the church with a background in the church, Zagaze recounts in his song Amakwebo Mu Church, the travesty that seem to have engulfed the Zambian church. In his song Amakwebo Mu Church Petersen visits a church after a long time only to find that the church has now become a market place, selling everything from houses, to cars, and music albums. He then requests, that "Messiah bwelelanso ukwapule nafuti … ama kwebo mu church yafula" which means Messiah come back on earth and come Whip again.... Cause business activity has increased in the church. The message in Amakwebo Mu Church is quite appropriate for the Zambian church, particularly the Pentecostal church that seem to be experiencing a serious identity crisis.

=== Music and politics ===
Petersen's prolific criticism to the politicians that had moved to ban his 2005 Munyaule. In the Job 13:13 song Zagaze stated that the parliamentarians had better things to do in parliament than debate his songs. Calling politicians as "ba mwankole wearing black suits",(pied crows) he called out their hypocrisy about targeting his Munyaule songs when they themselves had absolutely no morals. The same politicians who were pontificating about morals were "corrupt thieves, selfish and wife batterers.”

In 2013, he collaborated with PilAto on a single entitled BUFI a highly politically charged song that labeled the late President Michael Sata a ‘Father of Lies’. The song got a negative feed back from the supporters of the ruling party.

== Politics ==
In 2018 Petersen was standing on the People's Alliance for Change ticket for position of Lusaka Mayor.

In 2021, Petersen applied for adoption for parliamentary candidature under the United Party for National Development (UPND) for Nalikwanda Constituency. After not being adopted, he ditched the party and was adopted by the Socialist Party (SP) for Kabwata Constituency which was not well received by many on social media. He lost the election to Levy Mkandawire of UPND.

== Discography ==
=== Albums ===
- Apocalypto - 2023
- Sefula Boy - 2024
- Spartacus - 2018
- King Solomon – 2015
- Job 13:13 – 2012
- Stoga Compilation – 2011
- Bobojani – 2007
- Munyaule – 2005
- Soh Cah Toa - 2025

=== Selected songs ===
- Oh No - Petersen – 2005
- Munyaule – Petersen - 2005
- Promise - Petersen - 2005
- Nilabeko - Petersen - 2007
- Bobojani - Petersen - 2008
- Munyaule Nafuti – Petersen – 2008
- Musiye Atoping'e - Petersen - 2008
- Sefula Boy - Petersen - 2013
- Kumanda Kuli Boring – Petersen – 2013
- Oxygen - Petersen - 2012
- Bvuto La Fwaka – Petersen – 2012
- Spartacus - Petersen - 2018
- Life Yapa Zed - Petersen Zagaze - 2020
- Letter to My President – Petersen – 2012
- Tenta by Paul Smart (ft. Petersen) – 2024
- Zilile - Petersen Zagaze - 2023

== Awards ==
- 2008 – Ngoma Best Male.
- 2012 – ZMA Best Dancehall.
- 2018 – MoH Recognition of Excellence in Health and Art

=== Nominations ===
- 2013 – Beffta Best Int'l Act Nominee.
- 2016 – Kora Awards Best Male Southern Africa Nominee.

== Personal life ==
Petersen is married to Rosemary Msiska
