= Kalindula =

Music genre; type of bass guitar

Kalindula is a kind of bass guitar which gives its name to a style of popular music in southern-central Africa. It originated in the late 20th century and is popular in Zambia and is also found in Malawi and Zimbabwe. Some people claim it originated in the Democratic Republic of Congo but this cannot be fully supported by the evidence. Within Zambia, Kalindula is believed to have originated in Luapula Province, particularly in the Samfya district. This genre evolved during the mid 1940s to early 60s from a local dance known as Kontolola or Pimpinika. The genre is regarded as neo-traditional music because it blends elements of popular 20th century music with traditional Zambian styles like Akalela and Infunkutu.

Traditional Kalindula is primarily performed using homemade instruments, such as the banjo (pronounced locally as 'bahn-jo'). and the babatoni, commonly referred to as akalindula. These are often accompanied by percussion instruments like shakers, known locally as umunsakayi, and one or two drums which are struck with sticks called imishimpo. The rhythm section is typically enhanced by lighter percussion, produced by striking a bottle with a six-inch steel nail, adding a unique texture to the music. Kalindula bands in urban areas often incorporate electric guitars, electric bass and modern drum sets into their ensembles.

In the Southern Province of Zambia, kalindula bands compete to participate in the annual Tonga Music Festival sponsored by Chikuni Radio station. Winning groups are offered recording contracts by the radio station and their tapes are sold in markets throughout the province. Current favorites in the Southern Province are Green Mamba and Mashombe Blue Jeans. Amayenge, winners of the 2005 Ngoma Music Award, are another well-known and long-established group, together with Distro Kuomboka band, winners of several regional and national awards as 'Best Band', who dominate the Kalindula scene on the Copperbelt.

== See also ==
- List of African musicians
