= 2019 Women's Premier Hockey League (South Africa) =

Women's field hockey championship

Tournament details
- Host country: Johannesburg
- City: South Africa
- Dates: 18 July 2019–4 August 2019
- Teams: 6
- Venue: Randburg Hockey Stadium

Final positions
- Champions: Madikwe Rangers
- Runner-up: Wineland Wings
- Third place: Orange River Rafters

Tournament statistics
- Matches played: 19
- Goals scored: 75 (3.95 per match)
- Top scorer: Sylvia van Jaarsveldt (6 goals)
- Best player: Lisa-Marie Deetlefs
- Best young player: Bianca Wood
- Best goalkeeper: Mmatshepo Modipane

The 2019 Women's Premier Hockey League was the 4th edition of the Premier Hockey League, the annual tournament in women's field hockey championship of South Africa.

== Competition format ==
=== Format ===
The 2019 Premier Hockey League followed a single round-robin format, followed by a classification round.

During the pool stage teams played each other once. The top four ranked teams qualified for the Classification Round. Team 1 played Team 4, while Team 2 played Team 3 in the two semi-finals. The two victorious teams moved onto the Final, while the losing teams competed for third place.

=== Point allocation ===
Match points were distributed as follows:

- 4 points: win by 3+ goals
- 3 points: win and shoot-out win
- 1 point: shoot-out loss
- 0 points: loss

== Participating teams ==
Each squad consists of 20 players, made up of 7 marquee players as determined by SA Hockey’s team, with a further 3 players into their 20 from the "new generation" pool featuring the country’s most exciting young talent. Coaches were forced to release between 4 and 8 players from the 2018 squads ahead of the draft.

Blyde River Bunters

Head Coach: Marcelle Keet

1. Phumelela Mbande
2. Shindre-Lee Simmons
3. Celia Evans
4. Lauren Nina
5. Courtney du Preez
6. Izelle Verster
7. Nicolene Terblanche
8. Elmien Marais
9. Kaylim Bowers
10. Lelethu Ndakisa
11. Nicole Kemp
12. Marizen Marais
13. Gracious Mpe
14. Cloé de Souza
15. Charmorne Theron
16. Sarah Bingham
17. Meeghan Klomp
19. Hannah Shirley
20. Jessica de Bruyn-Smith
21. Miecke Flemming
31. Thando Mtalana
Madikwe Rangers

Head Coach: Sandile Bosman

1. Caitlin Grant
1. Mmatshepo Modipane
2. Nomnikelo Veto
3. Isabella da Rocha
4. Claire Gibbings
5. Tamlyn Kock
6. Mikkela le Roux
6. Kiara Fitzhenry
7. Courtney Abrahams
7. Ashleigh Datnow
8. Kristen Paton
9. Londeka Dlamini
10. Hildah Dikhudu
11. Toni Marks
12. Kirsty Adams
13. Lisa-Marie Deetlefs
14. Antoinette Louw (field hockey)
15. Amoré de Wet
17. Mandisa Sigudla
18. Hannah Pearce
19. Andrea Leader
0. Martiné de Bruin
Namaqualand Daisies

Head Coach: Bevan Bennet

1. Maboloke Serage
2. Lizanne Jacobs
3. Ammaarah Hendricks
4. Ashleigh Thomas
5. Lezaan Janse van Vuren
7. Laila Williams
8. Lethabo Nkoe
10. Bianca Wood
11. Lerato Mahole
12. Shelmy Hall
16. Kelsey Minnaar
17. Thati Segaole
18. Anke Badenhorst
19. Sare Laubscher
21. Sasha Sivertsen
22. Mia Barnard
23. Jean-Leigh du Toit
31. Mishka Ellis
Orange River Rafters

Head Coach: Shaun Hulley

0. Carienke Jacobs
1. Cheree Greyvenstein
2. Chane Hartel
3. Laylaa Davids
4. Zeena Martin
5. Amy Etherington
6. Jacolene McLaren
7. Donna Small
8. Charné Maddocks
9. Casey-Jean Botha
10. Zimkhitha Weston
11. Sulette Damons
13. Ongeziwe Mali
14. Dirkie Chamberlain
15. Christa Ramasimong
16. Natalie Esteves
19. Simone Gouws
26. Luche Klaasen
0. Francisca Darkoh
0. Zimasa Dunywa
0. Nicole Walraven
St. Lucia Lakers

Head Coach: Tarrin Ramsden

1. Sarah Paget
1. Marileze van Tonder
2. Quanita Bobbs
3. Demi Harmse
4. Jenna Shuker
5. Tegan Fourie
6. Karen Bowyer
7. Stephanie Baxter
8. Chemelda Ontong
9. Lisa Hawker
10. Lilian du Plessis
11. Kara-Lee Botes
12. Polly Mashau
13. Julia Hoal
14. Megan Anderson
15. Heraldine Olin
16. Erin Christie
17. Refilwe Ralikontsane
18. Paige Phillips
19. Tasmyn Preller
Wineland Wings

Head Coach: Ryan Pillay

1. Sisipho Magwaza
2. Michelle Dykman
3. Robyn Johnson
4. Nompilo Thenjwayo
5. Angela Welham
6. Badrunnisaa Halliday
7. Tarryn Glasby
8. Jessica Lardant
9. Pretty Morema
10. Sylvia van Jaarsveldt
11. Marguerite van Wyk
12. Aimee-Leigh Pote
13. Dunell van Taak
14. Legae Mentoor
15. Jade Mayne
16. Cailynn den Bakker
17. Christine Seggie
18. Maikemisetso Marokoane
19. Thando Chithi
21. Tiffany Jones
25. Stephanie Botha
31. Zimisele Shange
0. Candice Manuel

== Results ==
=== Pool stage ===
Pos	Team	Pld	W	WD	LD	L	GF	GA	GD	Pts	Qualification
1	–– Wineland Wings	5	2	2	0	1	9	2	+7	12	Semi-Final
2	–– Madikwe Rangers	5	3	0	0	2	10	9	+1	9	Semi-Final
3	–– Orange River Rafters	5	2	0	2	1	8	8	0	8	Semi-Final
4	–– Namaqualand Daisies	5	2	0	1	2	12	12	0	7	Semi-Final
5	–– Blyde River Bunters	5	2	0	0	3	5	7	−2	6	
6	–– St. Lucia Lakers	5	1	1	0	3	11	12	−1	6	

Source: SA Hockey
Rules for classification: 1) points; 2) matches won; 3) goal difference; 4) goals for; 5) head-to-head result; 6) field goals scored.

==== Matches ====
18 July 2019
12:00

Orange River Rafters	1–1	Wineland Wings
Damons 54'	Report	Botha 41'
Penalties
Mali (penalty shoot-out scored); Small (penalty shoot-out scored); Gouws (penalty shoot-out missed); Botha (penalty shoot-out scored); Damons (penalty shoot-out missed)	3–4	(penalty shoot-out missed) van Jaarsveldt; (penalty shoot-out scored) Johnson; (penalty shoot-out scored) Glasby; (penalty shoot-out scored) den Bakker; (penalty shoot-out scored) Botha

18 July 2019
16:00

Blyde River Bunters	0–1	Madikwe Rangers
	Report	Louw 58'

19 July 2019
08:00

Namaqualand Daisies	3–5	St. Lucia Lakers
Laubscher 6'; Segaole 7' du Toit 25'	Report	du Plessis 22'; Baxter 23'; Mashau 28'; Fourie 52'; Anderson 58'

19 July 2019
12:00

Blyde River Bunters	0–2	Wineland Wings
	Report	van Jaarsveldt 4'; Glasby 38'

20 July 2019
10:00

Orange River Rafters	1–0	Blyde River Bunters
Gouws 5'	Report

20 July 2019
14:00

Namaqualand Daisies	3–2	Madikwe Rangers
Thomas 5', 51'; Wood 59'	Report	Datnow 53'; Marks 57'

21 July 2019
12:00

Orange River Rafters	3–3	St. Lucia Lakers
Damons 1', 53'; Weston 10'	Report	Ralikontsane 5'; Bobbs 35' du Plessis 43'
Penalties
Mali (penalty shoot-out missed); Gouws (penalty shoot-out missed); Small (penalty shoot-out missed); Botha (penalty shoot-out missed)	0–2	(penalty shoot-out scored) Bobbs; (penalty shoot-out missed) du Plessis; (penalty shoot-out missed) Fourie; (penalty shoot-out scored) Hawker

21 July 2019
14:00

Namaqualand Daisies	1–1	Wineland Wings
Laubscher 50'	Report	van Jaarsveldt 26'
Penalties
Segaole (penalty shoot-out scored); Janse van Vuren (penalty shoot-out missed); Nkoe (penalty shoot-out scored); Laubscher (penalty shoot-out missed)	2–4	(penalty shoot-out scored) van Jaarsveldt; (penalty shoot-out scored) Johnson; (penalty shoot-out scored) Glasby; (penalty shoot-out scored) Lardant

27 July 2019
10:00

Blyde River Bunters	3–2	Namaqualand Daisies
Evans 1', 60'; Verster 13'	Report	Wood 32', 46'

27 July 2019
14:00

St. Lucia Lakers	1–2	Madikwe Rangers
Anderson 37'	Report	Veto 6', 21'

28 July 2019
08:00

Blyde River Bunters	2–1	St. Lucia Lakers
Evans 26'; Flemming 43'	Report	Baxter 5'

28 July 2019
10:00

Madikwe Rangers	4–3	Wineland Wings
Louw 10'; Deetlefs 21', 33'; Kock 59'	Report	Mayne 19' van Jaarsveldt 20'; Botha 49'

28 July 2019
16:00

Orange River Rafters	1–3	Namaqualand Daisies
Maddocks 57'	Report	Thomas 42' du Toit 49', 60'

=== Classification stage ===
Semi-finals
3 August 2019
Madikwe Rangers (p.s.o.)	3 (4)
Orange River Rafters	3 (3)
3 August 2019
Wineland Wings	4
Namaqualand Daisies	3

Final
4 August 2019
Madikwe Rangers (p.s.o.)	1 (3)
Wineland Wings	1 (2)
Third place
4 August 2019
Orange River Rafters	4
Namaqualand Daisies	1

==== Semi-finals ====
3 August 2019
12:00

Madikwe Rangers	3–3	Orange River Rafters
Deetlefs 4'; Paton 34'; Datnow 47'	Report	Weston 6'; Chamberlain 46'; Mali 56'
Penalties
Deetlefs (penalty shoot-out missed); Adams (penalty shoot-out scored); Pearce (penalty shoot-out missed) da Rocha (penalty shoot-out scored); Paton (penalty shoot-out missed); Paton (penalty shoot-out scored); Deetlefs (penalty shoot-out scored)	4–3	(penalty shoot-out missed) Small; (penalty shoot-out missed) Mali; (penalty shoot-out scored) Chamberlain; (penalty shoot-out missed) Weston; (penalty shoot-out scored) Botha; (penalty shoot-out scored) Chamberlain; (penalty shoot-out missed) Botha

16:00

Wineland Wings	4–3	Namaqualand Daisies
Glasby 32' van Jaarsveldt 35', 57'; Mayne 54'	Report	Segaole 12'; Thomas 48'; Wood 49'

==== Third place game ====
4 August 2019
10:00

Orange River Rafters	4–1	Namaqualand Daisies
Weston 2'; Small 16'; Chamberlain 34'; Mali 47'	Report	Wood 46'

==== Final ====
4 August 2019
14:00

Madikwe Rangers	1–1	Wineland Wings
Veto 49'	Reports	Lardant 53'
Penalties
Deetlefs (penalty shoot-out scored); Adams (penalty shoot-out scored); Pearce (penalty shoot-out missed) da Rocha (penalty shoot-out missed); Paton (penalty shoot-out missed); Deetlefs (penalty shoot-out scored)	3–2	(penalty shoot-out missed) van Jaarsveldt; (penalty shoot-out missed) Johnson; (penalty shoot-out scored) Glasby; (penalty shoot-out scored) Lardant; (penalty shoot-out missed) Botha; (penalty shoot-out missed) Glasby

== Awards ==
Player of the tournament	Goalkeeper of the tournament	Top goalscorer	Young Player of the tournament
Lisa-Marie Deetlefs (Rangers)	Mmatshepo Modipane (Rangers)	Sylvia van Jaarsveldt (Wings)	Bianca Wood (Daisies)

== Final ranking ==
Rank	Team
1st place, gold medalist(s)	Madikwe Rangers
2nd place, silver medalist(s)	Wineland Wings
3rd place, bronze medalist(s)	Orange River Rafters
4	Namaqualand Daisies
5	Blyde River Bunters
6	St. Lucia Lakers

== Goalscorers ==
There have been 75 goals scored in 19 matches, for an average of 3.95 goals per match.

6 goals

- Sylvia van Jaarsveldt (Wineland Wings)

5 goals

- Bianca Wood (Namaqualand Daisies)

4 goals

- Sulette Damons (Orange River Rafters)
- Ashleigh Thomas (Namaqualand Daisies)

3 goals

- Dirkie Chamberlain (Orange River Rafters)
- Lisa-Marie Deetlefs (Madikwe Rangers)
- Lilian du Plessis (St. Lucia Lakers)
- Jean-Leigh du Toit (Namaqualand Daisies)
- Celia Evans (Blyde River Bunters)
- Tarryn Glasby (Wineland Wings)
- Nomnikelo Veto (Madikwe Rangers)
- Zimkhitha Weston (Orange River Rafters)

2 goals

- Megan Anderson (St. Lucia Lakers)
- Stephanie Baxter (St. Lucia Lakers)
- Stephanie Botha (Wineland Wings)
- Ashleigh Datnow (Madikwe Rangers)
- Sare Laubscher (Namaqualand Daisies)
- Antoinette Louw (Madikwe Rangers)
- Ongeziwe Mali (Orange River Rafters)
- Jade Mayne (Wineland Wings)
- Kristen Paton (Madikwe Rangers)
- Thati Segaole (Namaqualand Daisies)

1 goal

- Quanita Bobbs (St. Lucia Lakers)
- Miecke Flemming (Blyde River Bunters)
- Tegan Fourie (St. Lucia Lakers)
- Simoné Gouws (Orange River Rafters)
- Tamlyn Kock (Madikwe Rangers)
- Jessica Lardant (Wineland Wings)
- Charné Maddocks (Orange River Rafters)
- Toni Marks (Madikwe Rangers)
- Polly Mashau (St. Lucia Lakers)
- Refilwe Ralikontsane (St. Lucia Lakers)
- Donna Small (Orange River Rafters)
- Izelle Verster (Blyde River Bunters)

Source: SAHA
