= 2017 Women's Premier Hockey League (South Africa) =

South Africa's national league, second season

Tournament details
- Host country: South Africa
- City: Johannesburg
- Dates: 25 November – 12 December
- Teams: 6
- Venue: Randburg Astro

Final positions
- Champions: –– Orange River Rafters (1st title)
- Runner-up: –– St. Lucia Lakers
- Third place: –– Blyde River Bunters

Tournament statistics
- Matches played: 19
- Goals scored: 52 (2.74 per match)
- Top scorer(s): –– Sulette Damons –– Tiffany Jones (4 goals)
- Best player: –– Kristen Paton
- Best young player: –– Ongeziwe Mali
- Best goalkeeper: –– Nicole La Fleur

The 2017 Women's Premier Hockey League was the second edition of South Africa's national league. The tournament was held in Johannesburg at the Randburg Astro. The tournament started on 25 November and culminated on 12 December 2017.

The Orange River Rafters won the tournament for the first time, defeating the St. Lucia Lakers 3–2 in a penalty shoot-out after the final finished as a 0–0 draw.

== Competition format ==
=== Format ===
The 2017 Premier Hockey League followed a single round-robin format, followed by a classification round.

During the pool stage teams played each other once. The top four ranked teams qualified for the Classification Round. Team 1 played Team 4, while Team 2 played Team 3 in the two semi-finals. The two victorious teams moved onto the Final, while the losing teams competed for third place.

=== Point allocation ===
Match points will be distributed as follows:

- 4 points: win by 3+ goals
- 3 points: win and shoot-out win
- 1 point: shoot-out loss
- 0 points: loss

== Participating teams ==
The following teams competed for the title:

- –– Blyde River Bunters
- –– Madikwe Rangers
- –– Namaqualand Daisies
- –– Orange River Rafters
- –– St. Lucia Lakers
- –– Wineland Wings

== Results ==
=== Pool stage ===
| Pos | Team | Pld | W | WD | LD | L | GF | GA | GD | Pts | Qualification |
|---|---|---|---|---|---|---|---|---|---|---|---|
| 1 | –– Blyde River Bunters | 5 | 3 | 1 | 0 | 1 | 7 | 5 | +2 | 12 | Semi-finals |
| 2 | –– St. Lucia Lakers | 5 | 2 | 1 | 1 | 1 | 11 | 8 | +3 | 11 | Semi-finals |
| 3 | –– Namaqualand Daisies | 5 | 2 | 1 | 1 | 1 | 7 | 7 | 0 | 10 | Semi-finals |
| 4 | –– Orange River Rafters | 5 | 2 | 0 | 0 | 3 | 11 | 12 | −1 | 7 | Semi-finals |
| 5 | –– Madikwe Rangers | 5 | 0 | 2 | 1 | 2 | 3 | 5 | −2 | 7 | |
| 6 | –– Wineland Wings | 5 | 1 | 0 | 2 | 2 | 8 | 10 | −2 | 5 | |

Source: South African Hockey Association
Rules for classification: 1) points; 2) matches won; 3) goal difference; 4) goals for; 5) head-to-head result; 6) field goals scored.

==== Fixtures ====
25 November 2017
10:00

| Namaqualand Daisies –– | 0–0 | –– Blyde River Bunters |
|---|---|---|
| | Report |
Penalties
| Southgate (penalty shoot-out missed); Gouws (penalty shoot-out scored); Fourie (penalty shoot-out missed); Paton (penalty shoot-out missed); C. Botha (penalty shoot-out missed) | 1–2 | (penalty shoot-out scored) Smith; (penalty shoot-out scored) Verster; (penalty shoot-out missed) Terblanche; (penalty shoot-out missed) Esteves; (penalty shoot-out missed) M. Marais |

Umpires:
Chantelle Britz (RSA)
Andrea Nicholson (RSA)

25 November 2017
14:00

| St. Lucia Lakers –– | 4–1 | –– Orange River Rafters |
|---|---|---|
| T. Jones 8'; Wood 15'; Baleni 59'; Mashau 60' | Report | Mahlangu 35' |

Umpires:
Wanri Venter (RSA)
Claire Cowan (RSA)

26 November 2017
08:00

| Madikwe Rangers –– | 1–1 | –– Wineland Wings |
|---|---|---|
| Du Plessis 38' | Report | Rhodes 19' |
Penalties
| Deetlefs (penalty shoot-out missed); Du Plessis (penalty shoot-out scored); Coston (penalty shoot-out scored) | 2–0 | (penalty shoot-out missed) Johnson; (penalty shoot-out missed) Glasby; (penalty shoot-out missed) Malan; (penalty shoot-out missed) Sivertsen |

Umpires:
Claire Cowan (RSA)
Lizé Strydom (RSA)

26 November 2017
12:00

| Orange River Rafters –– | 3–4 | –– Namaqualand Daisies |
|---|---|---|
| Small 41'; Louw 51'; Mallett 59' | Report | Fourie 22'; Adams 26'; Mali 45'; Paton 59' |

Umpires:
Andrea Nicholson (RSA)
Wanri Venter (RSA)

26 November 2017
16:00

| Blyde River Bunters –– | 3–1 | –– St. Lucia Lakers |
|---|---|---|
| Segaole 15', 29'; Luüs 55' | Report | T. Jones 19' |

Umpires:
Annelize Rostron (RSA)
Chantelle Britz (RSA)

2 December 2017
08:00

| St. Lucia Lakers –– | 3–1 | –– Namaqualand Daisies |
|---|---|---|
| Botes 38'; Reed 48', 58' | Report | Pearce 45' |

Umpires:
Melissa Taylor (RSA)
Claire Cowan (RSA)

2 December 2017
12:00

| Madikwe Rangers –– | 1–2 | –– Orange River Rafters |
|---|---|---|
| Van Jaarsveldt 23' | Report | Damons 3', 23' |

Umpires:
Lyndal Robertson (RSA)
Annelize Rostron (RSA)

2 December 2017
16:00

| Wineland Wings –– | 1–3 | –– Blyde River Bunters |
|---|---|---|
| Davids 2' | Report | Evans 9'; Esteves 39', 46' |

Umpires:
Michelle Joubert (RSA)
Wanri Venter (RSA)

3 December 2017
10:00

| Namaqualand Daisies –– | 2–1 | –– Wineland Wings |
|---|---|---|
| Maddocks 49'; S. Botha 60' | Report | McNulty 58' |

Umpires:
Wanri Venter (RSA)
Melissa Taylor (RSA)

3 December 2017
14:00

| Blyde River Bunters –– | 1–0 | –– Madikwe Rangers |
|---|---|---|
| Evans 50' | Report |

Umpires:
Annelize Rostron (RSA)
Claire Cowan (RSA)

9 December 2017
10:00

| St. Lucia Lakers –– | 1–1 | –– Madikwe Rangers |
|---|---|---|
| Anderson 24' | Report | De Jager 35' |
Penalties
| Botes (penalty shoot-out missed); S. Jones (penalty shoot-out scored); Reed (penalty shoot-out missed); Shuker (penalty shoot-out missed) | 1–3 | (penalty shoot-out scored) Coston; (penalty shoot-out scored) Du Plessis; (penalty shoot-out scored) Van Jaarsveldt; (penalty shoot-out missed) Da Rocha |

Umpires:
Lizé Strydom (RSA)
Lyndal Robertson (RSA)

9 December 2017
14:00

| Orange River Rafters –– | 2–3 | –– Wineland Wings |
|---|---|---|
| Klaasen 23'; Chamberlain 41' | Report | Richards 6'; Mayne 15'; Glasby 59' |

Umpires:
Chantelle Britz (RSA)
Andrea Nicholson (RSA)

10 December 2017
08:00

| Wineland Wings –– | 2–2 | –– St. Lucia Lakers |
|---|---|---|
| Glasby 2'; Malan 28' | Report | Christie 45'; T. Jones 46' |
Penalties
| Richards (penalty shoot-out missed); Glasby (penalty shoot-out missed); Malan (penalty shoot-out missed); Johnson (penalty shoot-out scored); Mayne (penalty shoot-out missed) | 1–2 | (penalty shoot-out missed) Botes; (penalty shoot-out scored) S. Jones; (penalty shoot-out missed) Bobbs; (penalty shoot-out missed) Hubach; (penalty shoot-out scored) Baxter |

Umpires:
Lyndal Robertson (RSA)
Andrea Nicholson (RSA)

10 December 2017
12:00

| Blyde River Bunters –– | 0–3 | –– Orange River Rafters |
|---|---|---|
| | Report | Damons 6'; Scheepers 11'; Hartel 53' |

Umpires:
Lizé Strydom (RSA)
Chantelle Britz (RSA)

10 December 2017
16:00

| Madikwe Rangers –– | 0–0 | –– Namaqualand Daisies |
|---|---|---|
| | Report |
Penalties
| Coston (penalty shoot-out scored); Du Plessis (penalty shoot-out missed); Van Jaarsveldt (penalty shoot-out missed); Da Rocha (penalty shoot-out missed) | 1–3 | (penalty shoot-out missed) Gouws; (penalty shoot-out scored) Bartsch; (penalty shoot-out scored) Pearce; (penalty shoot-out scored) Paton |

Umpires:
Melissa Taylor (RSA)
Annelize Rostron (RSA)

=== Classification round ===
Semi-finals
11 December 2017
–– Blyde River Bunters | 0
–– Orange River Rafters | 2
11 December 2017
–– St. Lucia Lakers | 2
–– Namaqualand Daisies | 0

Final
12 December 2017
–– Orange River Rafters (pen.) | 0 (3)
–– St. Lucia Lakers | 0 (2)
Third place
12 December 2017
–– Blyde River Bunters | 1
–– Namaqualand Daisies | 0

==== Semi-finals ====
11 December 2017
12:00

| St. Lucia Lakers –– | 2–0 | –– Namaqualand Daisies |
|---|---|---|
| Botes 6'; T. Jones 37' | Report |

Umpires:
Annelize Rostron (RSA)
Lizé Strydom (RSA)

11 December 2017
16:00

| Blyde River Bunters –– | 0–2 | –– Orange River Rafters |
|---|---|---|
| | Report | Small 36'; Damons 48' |

Umpires:
Melissa Taylor (RSA)
Lyndal Robertson (RSA)

==== Third and fourth place ====
12 December 2017
13:00

| Blyde River Bunters –– | 1–0 | –– Namaqualand Daisies |
|---|---|---|
| Verster 45' | Report |

Umpires:
Lyndal Robertson (RSA)
Melissa Taylor (RSA)

==== Final ====
12 December 2017
17:00

| Orange River Rafters –– | 0–0 | –– St. Lucia Lakers |
|---|---|---|
| | Report |
Penalties
| Greaves (penalty shoot-out missed); Small (penalty shoot-out scored); Chamberlain (penalty shoot-out scored); Damons (penalty shoot-out missed); Scheepers (penalty shoot-out missed) —— Chamberlain (penalty shoot-out missed); Small (penalty shoot-out scored) | 3–2 | (penalty shoot-out scored) Reed; (penalty shoot-out missed) S. Jones; (penalty shoot-out missed) T. Jones; (penalty shoot-out missed) Bobbs; (penalty shoot-out scored) Baxter —— (penalty shoot-out missed) Reed; (penalty shoot-out missed) S. Jones |

Umpires:
Lizé Strydom (RSA)
Annelize Rostron (RSA)

== Awards ==
| Player of the Tournament | Top Goalscorer(s) | Goalkeeper of the Tournament | Young Player of the Tournament |
|---|---|---|---|
| –– Kristen Paton | 2 Players (see list below) | –– Nicole la Fleur | –– Ongeziwe Mali |

== Statistics ==
=== Final standings ===
| Pos | Team | Pld | W | WD | LD | L | GF | GA | GD | Pts | Final standing |
|---|---|---|---|---|---|---|---|---|---|---|---|
| 1st place, gold medalist(s) | –– Orange River Rafters | 7 | 3 | 1 | 0 | 3 | 13 | 12 | +1 | 13 | Gold Medal |
| 2nd place, silver medalist(s) | –– St. Lucia Lakers | 7 | 3 | 1 | 2 | 1 | 13 | 8 | +5 | 15 | Silver Medal |
| 3rd place, bronze medalist(s) | –– Blyde River Bunters | 7 | 4 | 1 | 0 | 2 | 8 | 7 | +1 | 15 | Bronze Medal |
| 4 | –– Namaqualand Daisies | 7 | 2 | 1 | 1 | 3 | 7 | 10 | −3 | 10 | |
| 5 | –– Madikwe Rangers | 5 | 0 | 2 | 1 | 2 | 3 | 5 | −2 | 7 | |
| 6 | –– Wineland Wings | 5 | 1 | 0 | 2 | 2 | 8 | 10 | −2 | 5 | |

Source: South African Hockey Association

=== Goalscorers ===
There were 52 goals scored in 19 matches, for an average of 2.74 goals per match.

4 goals

- –– Sulette Damons
- –– Tiffany Jones

2 goals

- –– Natalie Esteves
- –– Celia Evans
- –– Thati Segaole
- –– Donna Small
- –– Kara-Lee Botes
- –– Kelly Reed
- –– Tarryn Glasby

1 goal

- –– Anél Luüs
- –– Izelle Verster
- –– Louise de Jager
- –– Lilian du Plessis
- –– Sylvia van Jaarsveldt
- –– Kirsty Adams
- –– Stephanie Botha
- –– Teagan Fourie
- –– Charné Maddocks
- –– Ongeziwe Mali
- –– Kristen Paton
- –– Hannah Pearce
- –– Dirkie Chamberlain
- –– Chané Hartel
- –– Luche Klaasen
- –– Marié Louw
- –– Lerato Mahlangu
- –– Taryn Mallett
- –– Jackie Scheepers
- –– Megan Anderson
- –– Ayanga Baleni
- –– Erin Christie
- –– Pollert Mashau
- –– Bianca Wood
- –– Illse Davids
- –– Liné Malan
- –– Jade Mayne
- –– Catherine McNulty
- –– Danielle Rhodes
- –– Kaila Richards
