= 2018 Women's Premier Hockey League (South Africa) =

Tournament details
- Host country: Johannesburg
- City: South Africa
- Dates: 18 July 2019–4 August 2019
- Teams: 6
- Venue: Randburg Hockey Stadium

Final positions
- Champions: –– Blyde River Bunters
- Runner-up: –– Madikwe Rangers
- Third place: –– St. Lucia Lakers

Tournament statistics
- Top scorer: –– Carmen Smith (5 goals)
- Best player: –– Kara-Lee Botes
- Best young player: –– Lezaan Jansen van Vuuren
- Best goalkeeper: –– Phumelela Mbande

The 2018 Women's Premier Hockey League was the 3rd edition of the Premier Hockey League, the annual tournament women's field hockey championship of South Africa.

The Blyde River Bunters won the tournament for the first time, defeating the Madikwe Rangers 1–0 in the final.

== Competition format ==
=== Format ===
The 2018 Premier Hockey League followed a single round-robin format, followed by a classification round.

During the pool stage teams played each other once. The top four ranked teams qualified for the Classification Round. Team 1 played Team 4, while Team 2 played Team 3 in the two semi-finals. The two victorious teams moved onto the Final, while the losing teams competed for third place.

=== Point allocation ===
Match points will be distributed as follows:

- 4 points: win by 3+ goals
- 3 points: win and shoot-out win
- 1 point: shoot-out loss
- 0 points: loss

== Participating teams ==
Each squad consists of 20 players, made up of 7 marquee players as determined by SA Hockey’s team, with a further 3 players into their 20 from the "new generation" pool featuring the country’s most exciting young talent. Coaches were forced to release between 4 and 8 players from the 2018 squads ahead of the draft.

Blyde River Bunters

Head Coach: Marcelle Keet

1. Phumelela Mbande (C, GK)
2. Marissa Poolman
3. Minke van Heerden
4. Meeghan Klomp
5. Courtney du Preez
6. Izelle Verster
8. Elmien Marais
9. Julia Fleming
11. Nicole Kemp
13. Mmamoagi Kungoane
14. Thati Segaole
15. Lelethu Ndakisa
16. Sarah Bingham
17. Miecke Flemming
20. Jessica de Bruyn-Smith
21. Kim Mentor
27. Carmen Smith
0. Nicolene Terblanche
0. Kirsty Adams
0. Anél LuŰs
Madikwe Rangers

Head Coach: Bevan Bennet

1. Mmatshepo Modipane (GK)
2. Nomnikelo Veto
3. Nicole Bartsch
4. Claire Gibbings
5. Lezaan Janse van Vuren
6. Ashleigh Datnow
9. Londeka Dlamini
10. Sylvia van Jaarsveldt
11. Hildah Dikhudu
12. Shindre-Lee Simmons
13. Lisa-Marié Deetlefs (C)
14. Andrea Leader
15. Elan-Margo van Vught
17. Monique Bartsch
18. Cheneal Raubenheimer
19. Amoré de Wet
0. Courtney Abrahams
0. Isabella da Rocha
0. Malikah Potgieter
0. Kristen Paton
Namaqualand Daisies

Head Coach: Andi Bernstein

2. Lize’ Steyn
3. Amy Greaves
4. Gretchin Davids
5. Tayla Johnson
6. Cindy Bothma
7. Dunell van Taak
8. Nicole Koenig
10. Lauren Nina
11. Toni Marks (C)
12. Marizen Marais
16. Natalie Esteves (C)
17. Didi Mgwenya
18. Aimee-Leigh Pote
19. Carli Pretorius
21. Refilwe Ralikontsane
22. Christine Seggie
23. Chardinay Penniston
24. Brady Wiseman
26. Jacinta Jubb
31. Sisipho Magwaza
Orange River Rafters

Head Coach:

1. Cheree Greyvenstein (GK)
2. Amy Etherington
3. Zeena Martin
5. Zimkhitha Weston
6. Kelsey Minnaar
7. Donna Small
8. Mia Barnard
9. Casey-Jean Botha
10. Lerato Mahlangu
11. Sulette Damons
13. Sare Laubscher
14. Francisca Darkoh
15. Candice Silent
16. Nicole Walraven (C)
17. Anneke Beukman
19. Charné Maddocks
26. Luche Klaasen
0. Badrunnisaa Halliday
0. Juliet Horne
0. Zimasa Dunywa
0. Chane Hartel
0. Simone Gouws
St. Lucia Lakers

Head Coach: Inky Zondi

1. Moya Smith (GK)
2. Lisa Hawker
3. Demi Harmse
4. Jenna Shuker
5. Tegan Fourie
7. Stephanie Baxter
9. Bianca Wood
10. Shelley Russell
11. Kara Botes
12. Polly Mashau
13. Lerato Mahole
14. Megan Anderson
15. Heraldine Olin
16. Erin Christie (C)
17. Chané Hill
18. Paige Phillips
19. Ayanga Baleni
20. Alexandra Kavanagh
0. Karen Bowyer
0. Tiffany Jones
Wineland Wings

Head Coach: Lenise Marais

1. Zimisele Shange (GK)
2. Michelle Dykman
3. Sandisiwe Tabata
4. Robyn Johnson
5. Candice Manuel
6. Ashleigh Thomas
7. Tarryn Glasby (C)
10. Nompilo Thenjwayo
12. Jessica Lardant
13. Jamie Southgate
15. Sasha Sivertsen
16. Edith Molikoe
17. Thando Chithi
18. Michelle Dias
19. Hope Nkosi
22. Chelsea Manoek
25. Stephanie Botha
0. Jessica O'Connor
0. Lida Kotze
0. Sonika van Heerden
0. Miche Bennett
0. Carly Redcliffe
0. Leigh Paulsen
0. Charlize Swanepoel (GK)

== Results ==
=== Pool stage ===
| Pos | Team | Pld | W | WD | LD | L | GF | GA | GD | Pts | Qualification |
|---|---|---|---|---|---|---|---|---|---|---|---|
| 1 | –– Orange River Rafters | 5 | 5 | 0 | 0 | 0 | 10 | 3 | +7 | 15 | Semi-Final |
| 2 | –– Blyde River Bunters | 5 | 4 | 0 | 0 | 1 | 6 | 3 | +3 | 12 | Semi-Final |
| 3 | –– St. Lucia Lakers | 5 | 3 | 0 | 0 | 2 | 4 | 4 | 0 | 9 | Semi-Final |
| 4 | –– Madikwe Rangers | 5 | 1 | 1 | 0 | 3 | 5 | 6 | −1 | 6 | Semi-Final |
| 5 | –– Namaqualand Daisies | 5 | 0 | 1 | 0 | 4 | 2 | 9 | −7 | 3 | |
| 6 | –– Wineland Wings | 5 | 0 | 0 | 2 | 3 | 3 | 6 | −3 | 2 | |

Source: SA Hockey
Rules for classification: 1) points; 2) matches won; 3) goal difference; 4) goals for; 5) head-to-head result; 6) field goals scored.

==== Matches ====
11 August 2018
10:00

| Orange River Rafters –– | 3-2 | –– Wineland Wings |
|---|---|---|
| Walraven 15'; Hartel 29'; Martin 31' | Report | Glasby 1', 46' |

11 August 2018
14:00

| Blyde River Bunters –– | 1-0 | –– Madikwe Rangers |
|---|---|---|
| Kungoane 33' | Report |

12 August 2018
08:00

| Namaqualand Daisies –– | 1-2 | –– St. Lucia Lakers |
|---|---|---|
| Marks 53' | Report | Hill 10'; Botes 48' |

12 August 2018
12:00

| Orange River Rafters –– | 3-1 | –– Madikwe Rangers |
|---|---|---|
| Damons 10'; Mahlangu 11'; Minnaar 20' | Report | Deetlefs 13' |

12 August 2018
16:00

| Blyde River Bunters –– | 2–1 | –– Wineland Wings |
|---|---|---|
| Smith 11'; Segaole 23' | Report | Glasby 10' |

16 August 2018
10:00

| Orange River Rafters –– | 2–0 | –– Blyde River Bunters |
|---|---|---|
| Mahlangu 18'; Barnard 49' | Report |

16 August 2018
12:00

| Namaqualand Daisies –– | 1–4 | –– Madikwe Rangers |
|---|---|---|
| Nina 23' | Report | van Jaarsveldt 42', 45'; Veto 55'; Deetlefs 57' |

16 August 2018
16:00

| St. Lucia Lakers –– | 1–0 | –– Wineland Wings |
|---|---|---|
| Fourie 27' | Report |

17 August 2018
12:00

| Orange River Rafters –– | 1–0 | –– St. Lucia Lakers |
|---|---|---|
| Botha 35' | Report |

17 August 2018
16:00

| Namaqualand Daisies –– | 1–1 | –– Wineland Wings |
|---|---|---|
| Esteves 43' | Report | Lardant 24' |
Penalties
| Jubb (penalty shoot-out scored); Nina (penalty shoot-out scored); Marks (penalty shoot-out missed); Esteves (penalty shoot-out scored) | 3–1 | (penalty shoot-out scored) Glasby; (penalty shoot-out missed) Molikoe; (penalty shoot-out missed) Sivertsen; (penalty shoot-out missed) Lardant |

18 August 2018
08:00

| Blyde River Bunters –– | 2–0 | –– Namaqualand Daisies |
|---|---|---|
| Smith 39'; Kungoane 59' | Report |

18 August 2018
12:00

| St. Lucia Lakers –– | 1–0 | –– Madikwe Rangers |
|---|---|---|
| Fourie 28' | Report |

19 August 2018
08:00

| Madikwe Rangers –– | 2–2 | –– Wineland Wings |
|---|---|---|
| Paton 40', 60' | Report | Manuel 1'; Botha 36' |
Penalties
| Deetlefs (penalty shoot-out missed); Bartsch (penalty shoot-out scored); Isabella (penalty shoot-out missed) van Jaarsveldt (penalty shoot-out scored); Paton (penalty shoot-out scored) | 3–1 | (penalty shoot-out scored) Johnson; (penalty shoot-out missed) Glasby; (penalty shoot-out missed) Sivertsen; (penalty shoot-out missed) Manuel |

19 August 2018
12:00

| Blyde River Bunters –– | 2–0 | –– St. Lucia Lakers |
|---|---|---|
| Smith 39', 54' | Report |

19 August 2018
16:00

| Orange River Rafters –– | 1–0 | –– Namaqualand Daisies |
|---|---|---|
| Mahlangu 28' | Report |

=== Classification stage ===
Semi-finals
25 August 2018
–– Orange River Rafters | 2 (1)
–– Madikwe Rangers (pen.) | 2 (3)
25 August 2018
–– Blyde River Bunters (pen.) | 1 (3)
–– St. Lucia Lakers | 1 (2)

Final
26 August 2018
–– Madikwe Rangers | 0
–– Blyde River Bunters | 1
Third place
26 August 2018
–– Orange River Rafters | 0
–– St. Lucia Lakers | 3

==== Semi-finals ====
25 August 2018
10:00

| –– Blyde River Bunters | 1–1 | –– St. Lucia Lakers |
|---|---|---|
| Smith 56' | Report | Anderson 35' |
Penalties
| Segaole (penalty shoot-out missed); Marais (penalty shoot-out scored); Verster (penalty shoot-out scored); Smith (penalty shoot-out missed); Van Heerden (penalty shoot-out scored) | 3–2 | (penalty shoot-out scored) Botes; (penalty shoot-out missed) Jones; (penalty shoot-out scored) Fourie; (penalty shoot-out missed) Wood; (penalty shoot-out missed) Baxter |

Umpires:
Lizé Strydom (RSA)
Melissa Taylor (RSA)

25 August 2018
14:00

| Orange River Rafters –– | 1–1 | –– Madikwe Rangers |
|---|---|---|
| Maddocks 4'; Damons 16' | Report | Van Jaarsveldt 36'; Simmons 47' |
Penalties
| Maddocks (penalty shoot-out missed); Barnard (penalty shoot-out scored); Small (penalty shoot-out missed); Botha (penalty shoot-out missed) | 1–3 | (penalty shoot-out scored) Deetlefs; (penalty shoot-out missed) Bartsch; (penalty shoot-out missed) Raubenheimer; (penalty shoot-out scored) Janse van Vuren; (penalty shoot-out scored) Van Jaarsveldt |

Umpires:
Michelle Joubert (RSA)
Wanri Venter (RSA)

==== Third place game ====
26 August 2018
10:00

| Orange River Rafters –– | 1–1 | –– St. Lucia Lakers |
|---|---|---|
| | Report | Baxter 12'; Jones 24'; Botes 45' |

Umpires:
Melissa Taylor (RSA)
Lizé Strydom (RSA)

==== Final ====
26 August 2018
14:00

| Madikwe Rangers –– | 0–1 | –– Blyde River Bunters |
|---|---|---|
| | Report | Verster 29' |

Umpires:
Wanri Venter (RSA)
Michelle Joubert (RSA)

== Awards ==
| Player of the tournament | Goalkeeper of the tournament | Top goalscorer | Young Player of the tournament |
|---|---|---|---|
| Kara-Lee Botes (Lakers) | Phumelela Mbande (Bunters) | Carmen Smith (Bunters) | Lezaan Jansen van Vuuren (Bunters) |

== Final ranking ==
| Rank | Team |
|---|---|
| 1st place, gold medalist(s) | –– Blyde River Bunters |
| 2nd place, silver medalist(s) | –– Madikwe Rangers |
| 3rd place, bronze medalist(s) | –– St. Lucia Lakers |
| 4 | –– Orange River Rafters |
| 5 | –– Namaqualand Daisies |
| 6 | –– Wineland Wings |

== Goalscorers ==
There have been 47 goals scored in 19 matches, for an average of 2.47 goals per match.

5 goals

- –– Carmen Smith

3 goals

- –– Sylvia van Jaarsveldt
- –– Lerato Mahlangu
- –– Tarryn Glasby

2 goals

- –– Mmamoagi Kungoane
- –– Lisa-Marie Deetlefs
- –– Kristen Paton
- –– Sulette Damons
- –– Kara-Lee Botes
- –– Tegan Fourie

1 goal

- –– Thati Segaole
- –– Shindre-Lee Simmons
- –– Izelle Verster
- –– Nomnikelo Veto
- –– Natalie Esteves
- –– Toni Marks
- –– Lauren Nina
- –– Mia Barnard
- –– Casey-Jean Botha
- –– Chane Hartel
- –– Charné Maddocks
- –– Zeena Martin
- –– Kelsey Minnaar
- –– Nicole Walraven
- –– Megan Anderson
- –– Stephanie Baxter
- –– Chané Hill
- –– Shelley Jones
- –– Stephanie Botha
- –– Jessica Lardant
- –– Candice Manuel

Source: SAHA
