= Hockey at the 2022 Commonwealth Games – Women's team squads =

This article lists the squads of the women's field hockey competition at the 2022 Commonwealth Games, which will be held in Birmingham, England from 29 July to 8 August 2022.

== Pool A ==
=== Canada ===
The squad was announced on 4 July 2022.

Head coach: Robert Short

1. Chloe Walton
4. Melanie Scholz
6. Jordyn Faiczak
7. Anna Mollenhauer
9. Madison Thompson
12. Sara Goodman
13. Hannah Haughn
14. Karli Johansen
15. Grace Delmotte
16. Natalie Sourisseau (C)
17. Sara McManus
18. Alexis de Armond
19. Audrey Sawers
21. Amanda Woodcroft
22. Madeline Secco
23. Brienne Stairs
31. Rowan Harris (GK)
34. Marcia LaPlante (GK)

=== England ===
The squad was announced on 14 June 2022.

Head coach: (Scotland) David Ralph

1. Madeleine Hinch (GK)
4. Laura Unsworth
6. Anna Toman
7. Hannah Martin (C)
11. Holly Hunt
13. Elena Rayer
14. Tessa Howard
16. Isabelle Petter
18. Giselle Ansley
20. Hollie Pearne-Webb (C)
21. Fiona Crackles
23. Sophie Hamilton
24. Shona McCallin
25. Sabbie Heesh (GK)
26. Lily Owsley
28. Flora Peel
31. Grace Balsdon
41. Lily Walker

=== Ghana ===
Head coach: (Pakistan) Ghazanfar Ali

1. Bridget Azumah (GK)
3. Serwaa Boakye
4. Ernestina Coffie
5. Hagiet Copson
6. Nafisatu Umaru (C)
7. Adizatu Sulemana
8. Cecilia Amoako
10. Elizabeth Opoku
11. Lydia Afriyie
12. Martha Sarfoa
14. Mavis Berko
17. Vivian Narkuor
18. Abigail Boye (GK)
19. Racheal Bamfo
22. Roberta Sarfo
24. Eleanor Otoo
26. Doris Antwi
27. Dede Okine

=== India ===
The squad was announced on 23 June 2022.

Head coach: (Netherlands) Janneke Schopman

2. Gurjit Kaur
3. Deep Grace Ekka
4. Monika Malik
5. Sonika Tandi
7. Sharmila Devi
8. Nikki Pradhan
11. Savita Punia (C, GK)
13. Rajani Etimarpu (GK)
15. Nisha Warsi
16. Vandana Katariya
18. Udita
20. Lalremsiami
24. Jyoti
25. Navneet Kaur
27. Sushila Chanu
30. Salima Tete
32. Neha Goyal
58. Sangita Kumari

=== Wales ===
The squad was announced on 15 June 2022.

Head coach: Kevin Johnson

1. Rose Thomas (GK)
3. Livvy Hoskins
6. Sophie Robinson
7. Sian French (C)
8. Sarah Jones
10. Phoebe Richards
14. Eloise Laity
15. Beth Bingham
17. Leah Wilkinson (C)
18. Izzie Howell
21. Xenna Hughes
22. Ella Jackson (GK)
23. Hannah Cozens
27. Jo Westwood
29. Izzy Webb
34. Millie Holme
35. Holly Munro
42. Rebecca Daniel

== Pool B ==
=== Australia ===
The squad was announced on 11 June 2022.

Head coach: Katrina Powell

1. Claire Colwill
2. Ambrosia Malone
4. Amy Lawton
6. Penny Squibb
7. Aleisha Power (GK)
8. Georgia Wilson
9. Shanea Tonkin
10. Madison Fitzpatrick
12. Greta Hayes
14. Stephanie Kershaw
15. Kaitlin Nobbs
18. Jane Claxton (C)
19. Jocelyn Bartram (GK)
20. Karri Somerville
21. Renee Taylor
24. Mariah Williams
29. Rebecca Greiner
30. Grace Stewart

=== Kenya ===
Head coach: Jacqueline Mwangi

1. Quinter Okore
2. Jeriah Osare
4. Vivian Onyango
5. Caroline Guchu
6. Lynne Kipsang
7. Mourine Owiti
8. Alice Owiti
10. Naomi Kemunto
11. Beatrice Mbugua
13. Grace Bwire
14. Milicent Adhiambo
16. Gilly Okumu
17. Flavia Mutiva
18. Lynn Mwangi
19. Maureen Okumu
20. Nichole Odhiambo
21. Eleanor Chebet
22. Joan Maranda

=== New Zealand ===
The squad was announced on 9 June 2022.

Head coach: Darren Smith

1. Tarryn Davey
2. Olivia Shannon
3. Alexandra Lukin
4. Olivia Merry (C)
5. Frances Davies
6. Hope Ralph
7. Aniwaka Haumaha
10. Brooke Roberts (GK)
14. Tyler Lench
15. Grace O'Hanlon (GK)
17. Stephanie Dickins
18. Anna Crowley
19. Tessa Jopp
20. Megan Hull (C)
21. Alia Jaques
22. Katie Doar
26. Kaitlin Cotter
32. Rose Tynan

=== Scotland ===
The squad was announced on 13 June 2022.

Head coach: Chris Duncan

1. Jennifer Eadie
2. Nicola Cochrane (GK)
3. Louise Campbell
6. Rebecca Ward
8. Amy Costello
9. Eve Pearson
10. Sarah Robertson (C)
12. Charlotte Watson
15. Heather McEwan
17. Sarah Jamieson
19. Katie Robertson
20. Bronwyn Shields
21. Jessica Ross
26. Robyn Collins
27. Fiona Burnet
29. Amy Gibson (GK)
31. Millie Steiger
24. Elizabeth Wilson

=== South Africa ===
The squad was announced on 8 June 2022.

Head coach: Giles Bonnet

5. Edith Molikoe
7. Marizen Marais
8. Kristen Paton
9. Robyn Johnson
10. Onthatile Zulu
13. Lisa-Marié Deetlefs
16. Erin Christie
18. Hannah Pearce
19. Lilian du Plessis
23. Bernadette Coston (C)
24. Phumelela Mbande (C, GK)
28. Quanita Bobbs
29. Tarryn Lombard
31. Bianca Wood
35. Jean-Leigh du Toit
36. Shirndré-Lee Simmons
40. Hanrie Louw
41. Maboloke Serage (GK)
