= 2017 Women's Cape Town Summer Series =

International field hockey competition

Tournament details
- City: Cape Town, South Africa
- Dates: 20 January – 26 February
- Teams: 5 (from 4 confederations)
- Venue: Hartleyvale Stadium

Final positions
- Champions: England (1st title)
- Runner-up: China
- Third place: Belgium

Tournament statistics
- Matches played: 14
- Goals scored: 53 (3.79 per match)
- Top scorer: (South Africa) Candice Manuel (5 goals)

The 2017 Cape Town Summer Series was the second edition of the women's field hockey friendly series, comprising a number of test matches between the national teams of Belgium, Chile, China, England and the hosts, South Africa. The series was held at Hartleyvale Stadium in Cape Town, from 20 January to 26 February.

England finished in first place, topping the pool at the conclusion of the matches.

== Results ==
All times are local (SAST).

=== Standings ===
Pos	Team	Pld	W	D	L	GF	GA	GD	PCT	Result
1st place, gold medalist(s)	England (C)	2	2	0	0	7	2	+5	1.000	Champions
2nd place, silver medalist(s)	China	7	5	0	2	16	13	+3	.714	
3rd place, bronze medalist(s)	Belgium	5	2	2	1	8	5	+3	.600	
4	Chile	5	1	1	3	4	9	−5	.300	
5	South Africa (H)	9	2	1	6	18	24	−6	.278	

Source: I and II
Rules for classification: 1) points; 2) goal difference; 3) games won; 4) head-to-head result.
(C) Champions; (H) Hosts

=== Fixtures ===
20 January 2017
18:00

Chile	0–3	South Africa
	Report	Marais 14'; Manuel 29'; Davids 57'

Umpires:
Wanri Venter (RSA)
Lizé Strydom (RSA)

21 January 2017
16:00

South Africa	2–3	China
Bobbs 20'; Russell 52'	Report	Gu 13', 42'; Zhang X. 40'

Umpires:
Lizé Strydom (RSA)
Wanri Venter (RSA)

22 January 2017
16:00

China	2–1	Chile
Cong 8'; Yu 27'	Report	Tala 33'

Umpires:
Lizé Strydom (RSA)
Wanri Venter (RSA)

25 January 2017
18:00

China	5–2	South Africa
Sun 7'; Gao 34'; Gu 41'; Song X. 50'; Zhang X. 52'	Report	Manuel 11'; Damons 35'

Umpires:
Melissa Taylor (RSA)
Andrea Nicholson (RSA)

26 January 2017
18:00

South Africa	2–3	Chile
Mayne 19'; Manuel 58'	Report	Maldonado 12'; Palma 35'; Urroz 48'

Umpires:
Tanja Schafer (RSA)
Melissa Taylor (RSA)

28 January 2017
16:00

Chile	0–2	China
	Report	Zhao 45'; Song Q. 58'

Umpires:
Chantelle Britz (RSA)
Tanja Schafer (RSA)

29 January 2017
14:00

Belgium	0–0	Chile
	Report

Umpires:
Claire Cowan (RSA)
Chantelle Britz (RSA)

29 January 2017
16:00

South Africa	4–2	China
Deetlefs 2', 34'; Coston 53'; Manuel 59'	Report	Bao 15', 40'

Umpires:
Melissa Taylor (RSA)
Tanja Schafer (RSA)

30 January 2017
18:00

Belgium	1–0	South Africa
Weyns 55'	Report

Umpires:
Andrea Nicholson (RSA)
Claire Cowan (RSA)

1 February 2017
18:00

China	2–1	Belgium
Gu 14'; Bao 60'	Report	Scheerlinck 27'

Umpires:
Lyndal Robertson (RSA)
Andrea Nicholson (RSA)

2 February 2017
18:00

Belgium	3–0	China
Steenackers 6'; Fobe 11'; Gerniers 51'	Report

Umpires:
Claire Cowan (RSA)
Lyndal Robertson (RSA)

2 February 2017
18:00

South Africa	3–3	Belgium
Du Plessis 8'; Coston 31'; Glasby 43'	Report	Raes 24'; Gerniers 30'; Boon 47'

Umpires:
Andrea Nicholson (RSA)
Lyndal Robertson (RSA)

25 February 2017
16:00

England	4–2	South Africa
Haycroft 34'; Leigh 42'; Watton 48'; Balsdon 59'	Report	Manuel 24'; Chamberlain 36'

Umpires:
Michelle Joubert (RSA)
Annelize Rostron (RSA)

26 February 2017
16:00

South Africa	0–3	England
	Report	Owsley 11'; Hunter 31'; Sanders 49'

Umpires:
Annelize Rostron (RSA)
Michelle Joubert (RSA)

== Goalscorers ==
There were 53 goals scored in 14 matches, for an average of 3.79 goals per match.

5 goals

- (South Africa) Candice Manuel

4 goals

- (China) Gu Bingfeng

3 goals

- (China) Bao Qianqian

2 goals

- (Belgium) Alix Gerniers
- (China) Zhang Xiaoxue
- (South Africa) Bernadette Coston
- (South Africa) Lisa-Marié Deetlefs

1 goal

- (Belgium) Jill Boon
- (Belgium) Aliné Fobe
- (Belgium) Anouk Raes
- (Belgium) Lisa Scheerlinck
- (Belgium) Silke Steenackers
- (Belgium) Anne-Sophie Weyns
- (Chile) María Maldonado
- (Chile) Constanza Palma
- (Chile) Francisca Tala
- (Chile) Manuela Urroz
- (China) Gao Lihua
- (China) Sun Xiaomei
- (China) Song Xiaoming
- (China) Song Qingling
- (China) Yu Qian
- (China) Zhao Yudiao
- (China) Cong Zengyu
- (England) Grace Balsdon
- (England) Sarah Haycroft
- (England) Joanne Hunter
- (England) Joie Leigh
- (England) Lily Owsley
- (England) Erica Sanders
- (England) Eloise Watton
- (South Africa) Quanita Bobbs
- (South Africa) Dirkie Chamberlain
- (South Africa) Sulette Damons
- (South Africa) Illse Davids
- (South Africa) Tarryn Glasby
- (South Africa) Marizen Marais
- (South Africa) Jade Mayne
- (South Africa) Lilian du Plessis
- (South Africa) Shelley Russell
