= Orange River Rafters =

South Africa field hockey club

- Full name: Orange River Rafters
- Nickname(s): Rafters
- League: Premier Hockey League
- Founded: 2016
Home

Orange River Rafters is a South Africa field hockey club. The club was established in 2016, and is one of 6 established to compete in South African Hockey Association's new premier domestic competition, Premier Hockey League.

== History ==
The Orange River Rafters have been inspired by famous tourist areas in Orange River in Free State and Northern Cape.

== Tournament history ==
=== Premier Hockey League ===
- 2016 - 6th
- 2017 - (gold)
- 2018 - 4th
- 2019 - (bronze)

== Teams ==
The women's team was announced on 10 July 2019.

Head Coach: Shaun Hulley

0. Carienke Jacobs
1. Cheree Greyvenstein
2. Chane Hartel
3. Laylaa Davids
4. Zeena Martin
5. Amy Etherington
6. Jacolene McLaren
7. Donna Small
8. Charné Maddocks
9. Casey-Jean Botha
10. Zimkhitha Weston
11. Sulette Damons
13. Ongeziwe Mali
14. Dirkie Chamberlain
15. Christa Ramasimong
16. Natalie Esteves
19. Simone Gouws
26. Luche Klaasen
0. Francisca Darkoh
0. Zimasa Dunywa
0. Nicole Walraven
