= Madikwe Rangers =

South Africa field hockey club

- Full name: Madikwe Rangers
- Nickname(s): Ranger
- League: Premier Hockey League
- Founded: 2016

Personnel
- Coach: Sandile Bosman
Home

Madikwe Rangers is a South Africa field hockey club. The club was established in 2016, and is one of 6 established to compete in South African Hockey Association's new premier domestic competition, Premier Hockey League.

== History ==
The Madikwe Rangers have been inspired by famous tourist areas in Madikwe Game Reserve in North West Province.

== Tournament history ==
=== Premier Hockey League ===
- 2016 - (silver)
- 2017 - 5th
- 2018 - (silver)
- 2019 - (gold)

== Teams ==
The women's team was announced on 10 July 2019.

Head Coach: Sandile Bosman

1. Caitlin Grant
1. Mmatshepo Modipane
2. Nomnikelo Veto
3. Isabella da Rocha
4. Claire Gibbings
5. Tamlyn Kock
6. Mikkela le Roux
6. Kiara Fitzhenry
7. Courtney Abrahams
7. Ashleigh Datnow
8. Kristen Paton
9. Londeka Dlamini
10. Hildah Dikhudu
11. Toni Marks
12. Kirsty Adams
13. Lisa-Marie Deetlefs
14. Antoinette Louw (field hockey)
15. Amoré de Wet
17. Mandisa Sigudla
18. Hannah Pearce
19. Andrea Leader
