= Hanrie Louw =

South African field hockey player

Personal information
- Born: 15 December 2001 (age 24)

Sport
- Sport: Field hockey
- Position: Midfielders
- Club: Tuks
National team
Years	Team	Caps	Goals
2022	South Africa U21	5	(0)
2022-present	South Africa	18	(0)
Medal record
Women's field hockey
Representing South Africa
Africa Cup of Nations
Gold medal – first place	2022 Accra

Hanrie Louw (birth 15 December 2001) is a South African field hockey player for the South African national team.

== Personal life ==
Hanrie Louw attended Die Hoërskool Menlopark, studied at the University of Pretoria.

== International career ==
=== Under–21 ===
Louw made her debut for the South Africa U–21 in 2022 at the FIH Junior World Cup in Potchefstroom.

=== National team ===
Louw participated at the Hockey Africa Cup of Nations and the 2022 Women's FIH Hockey World Cup. Shortly after this announcement, she was also named in the squad for the Commonwealth Games in Birmingham.
