= Lerato Mahole =

South African field hockey player

Personal information
- Born: Lerato Matsie Mahole; 29 December 1999 (age 26)

Sport
- Sport: Field hockey
- Club: Tuks
Senior career
Years	Team	Caps	Goals
2018–present	Tuks	-	-
2018	St. Lucia Lakers	-	-
2019	Namaqualand Daisies	-	-
National team
Years	Team	Caps	Goals
2021–present	South Africa	15	(0)
Medal record
Women's field hockey
Representing South Africa
Africa Cup of Nations
Gold medal – first place	2022 Accra
Gold medal – first place	2025 Ismailia
- Updated on 29 August 2025

Lerato Matsie Mahole (born 29 December 1999) is a South African field hockey player for the South African national team. In 2021 she will become an Olympian, representing South Africa at the XXXII Olympic Games in Tokyo.

== Personal life ==
She attended Curro Klerksdorp, graduated at the University of Pretoria, where she studies Civil Engineering.

== Career ==
Despite never having made an international appearance, Mahole was named to the South Africa squad for the 2020 Summer Olympics in Tokyo and the Africa Cup of Nations in Accra.
