= Uganda Hockey Association =

Governing body of field hockey in Uganda

- Sport: Field Hockey
- Affiliation: FIH
- Regional affiliation: AHF
- President: Philip Wafula Mulindo
- Secretary: Stanley Tamale
- (Uganda)

The Uganda Hockey Association is the governing body of field hockey in Uganda. It is affiliated to IHF International Hockey Federation and AHF African Hockey Federation. The headquarters of the Association are in Kampala, Uganda, at Lugogo Sports Complex, on Plot 2-10 Coronation Avenue, Lugogo.

== History ==
Uganda Hockey Association was formed between 1944 and 1945, and by 1957, Uganda had its first ever outing to Nairobi for the DeSouza Gold Cup and this resulted in the growth of the sport.

The Uganda Hockey Federation is the body mandated to promote the sport of field hockey in Uganda and is registered with the National Council of Sports and is affiliated to the International Hockey Federation in Switzerland.

== Administration ==
Philip Wafula Mulindo is the President of Uganda Hockey Association and Stanley Tamale is the General Secretary.

Some of the National Hockey Calendar events include:

- Uganda Hockey League (Men and Women)
- Independence Cup - a knockout tournament held around Uganda's Independence Day
- Easter Cup - a short-form tournament held around the Easter period, often used to keep teams active mid-season
- Uganda Cup - an annual knockout tiournament usually held in May

== History ==
=== 6th Men Field Hockey Africa Nations Cup ===
From 13 to 20 May 2000, the Uganda national team played the 6th Men's Hockey Africa Cup of Nations in Bulawayo, Zimbabwe, which classified the winner for the World Cup.

Participating countries were South Africa, Egypt, Zimbabwe, Ghana, Nigeria, Namibia, and Uganda. 16 Ugandan players took part in the competition; the trainer was the Italian international goalkeeper Damian Angió. The Ugandan team scored four times, and despite finishing last in the tournament, it was a victory in itself, because the national team was back after being absent for 27 years in official tournaments.

== Grounds ==
Uganda hockey grounds located in Lugogo off Jinja road.

== See also ==
- Uganda men's national field hockey team
- Uganda women's national field hockey team
- African Hockey Federation
