= Zheng Jiali =

Chinese field hockey player

Personal information
- Born: 1 July 1997 (age 29) China

Sport
- Sport: Field hockey
- Position: Midfield
National team
Years	Team	Caps	Goals
2022–	China	17	(1)
Medal record
Women's field hockey
Representing China

Zheng Jiali (born 1 July 1997) is a field hockey player from China, who plays as a midfielder.

== Career ==
=== National team ===
Zheng Jiali made her senior international debut for China in 2022. She made her first international appearance during season three of the FIH Pro League. At the conclusion of the FIH Pro League, Zheng was named in the Chinese squad for the 2022 FIH World Cup in Amsterdam and Terrassa. During the tournament, she scored her first international goal, helping China to a ninth-place finish.

After the FIH World Cup, Zheng did not represent the national team again until 2024 when she was called into the squad for the International Festival of Hockey in Perth. She has since been named in the squad for the Asian Champions Trophy in Rajgir.

=== International goals ===
Goal	Date	Location	Opponent	Score	Result	Competition	Ref.
1	5 July 2022	Wagener Stadium, Amsterdam, Netherlands	India	1–0	1–1	2022 FIH World Cup	
