= Namaqualand Daisies =

South Africa field hockey club

- Full name: Namaqualand Daisies
- Nickname(s): Daisies
- League: Premier Hockey League
- Founded: 2016

Namaqualand Daisies is a South Africa women's field hockey club. The club was established in 2016, and is one of 6 established to compete in South African Hockey Association's new premier domestic competition, Premier Hockey League.

== History ==
The Namaqualand Daisies have been inspired by famous tourist areas in Namaqua National Park in Northern Cape.

== Tournament history ==
=== Premier Hockey League ===
- 2016 - 4th
- 2017 - 4th
- 2018 - 5th
- 2019 - 4th

== Teams ==
The women's team was announced on 10 July 2019.

Head Coach: Bevan Bennet

1. Maboloke Serage (GK)
2. Lizanne Jacobs
3. Ammaarah Hendricks
4. Ashleigh Thomas
5. Lezaan Janse van Vuren
7. Laila Williams
8. Lethabo Nkoe
10. Bianca Wood
11. Lerato Mahole
12. Shelmy Hall
16. Kelsey Minnaar
17. Thati Segaole
18. Anke Badenhorst
19. Sare Laubscher
21. Sasha Sivertsen
22. Mia Barnard
23. Jean-Leigh du Toit
31. Mishka Ellis (GK)

== See also ==
- Namaqualand Daisy
