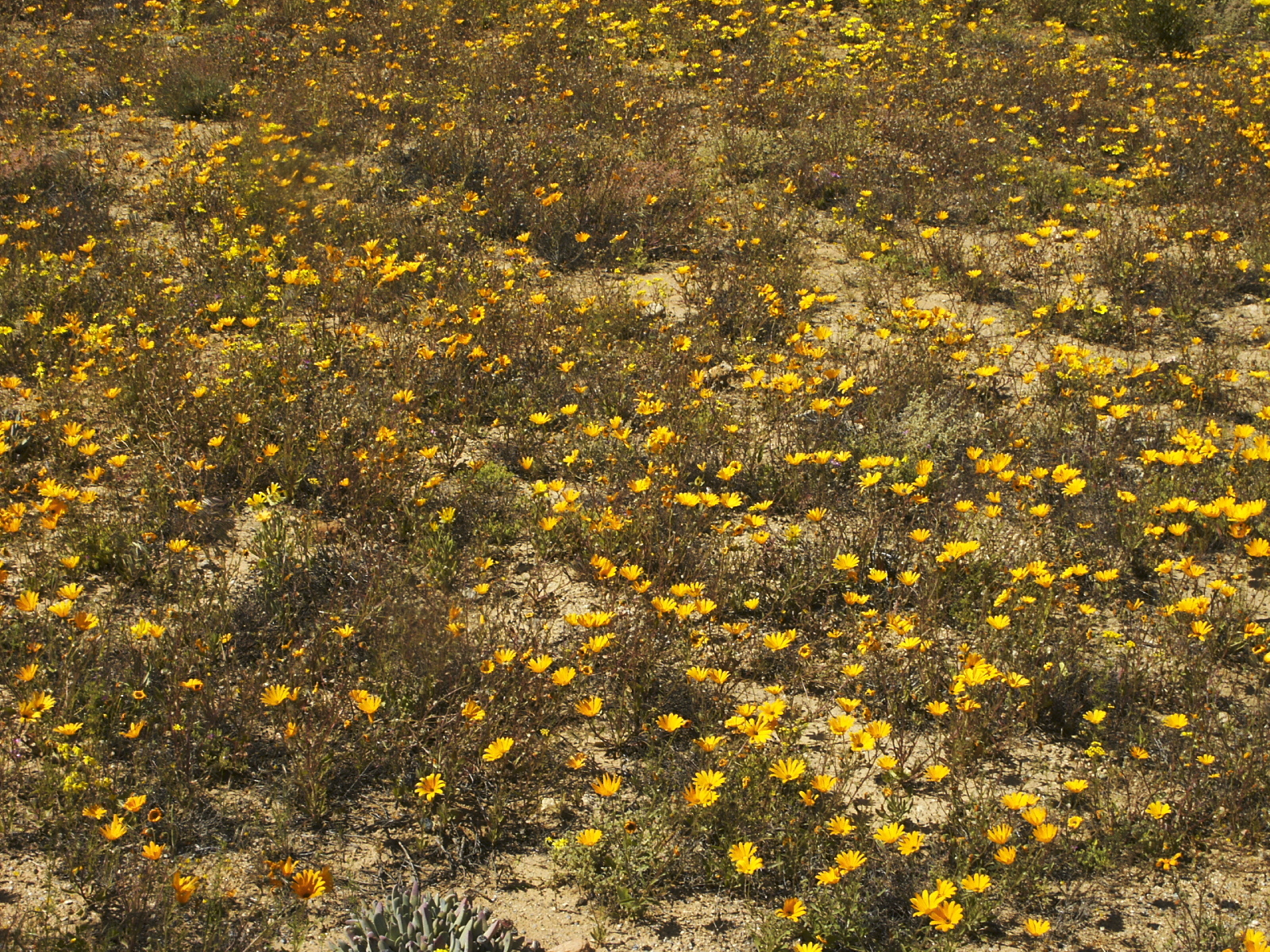

Scientific classification
- Kingdom: Plantae
- Clade: Embryophytes
- Clade: Tracheophytes
- Clade: Angiosperms
- Clade: Eudicots
- Clade: Asterids
- Order: Asterales
- Family: Asteraceae
- Genus: Dimorphotheca
- Species: D. sinuata

Binomial name
- Dimorphotheca sinuata DC.

Synonyms
- Synonymy: Acanthotheca dentata DC.; Acanthotheca integrifolia DC.; Dimorphotheca aurantiaca Hort.; Dimorphotheca calendulacea Harv.; Dimorphotheca dentata (DC.) Harv.; Dimorphotheca integrifolia (DC.) Harv.; Dimorphotheca pseud-aurantiaca Schinz & Thell.; Calendula tragus Curtis 1789 not Aiton 1789 nor Jacq. 1797

= Dimorphotheca sinuata =

Species of flowering plant

Dimorphotheca sinuata, the glandular Cape marigold, Namaqualand daisy, or orange Namaqualand daisy; syn. Dimorphotheca aurantiaca hort.) is a species of plant native to southern Africa. It is also widely cultivated as an ornamental and naturalized in parts of the United States, primarily California and Arizona.

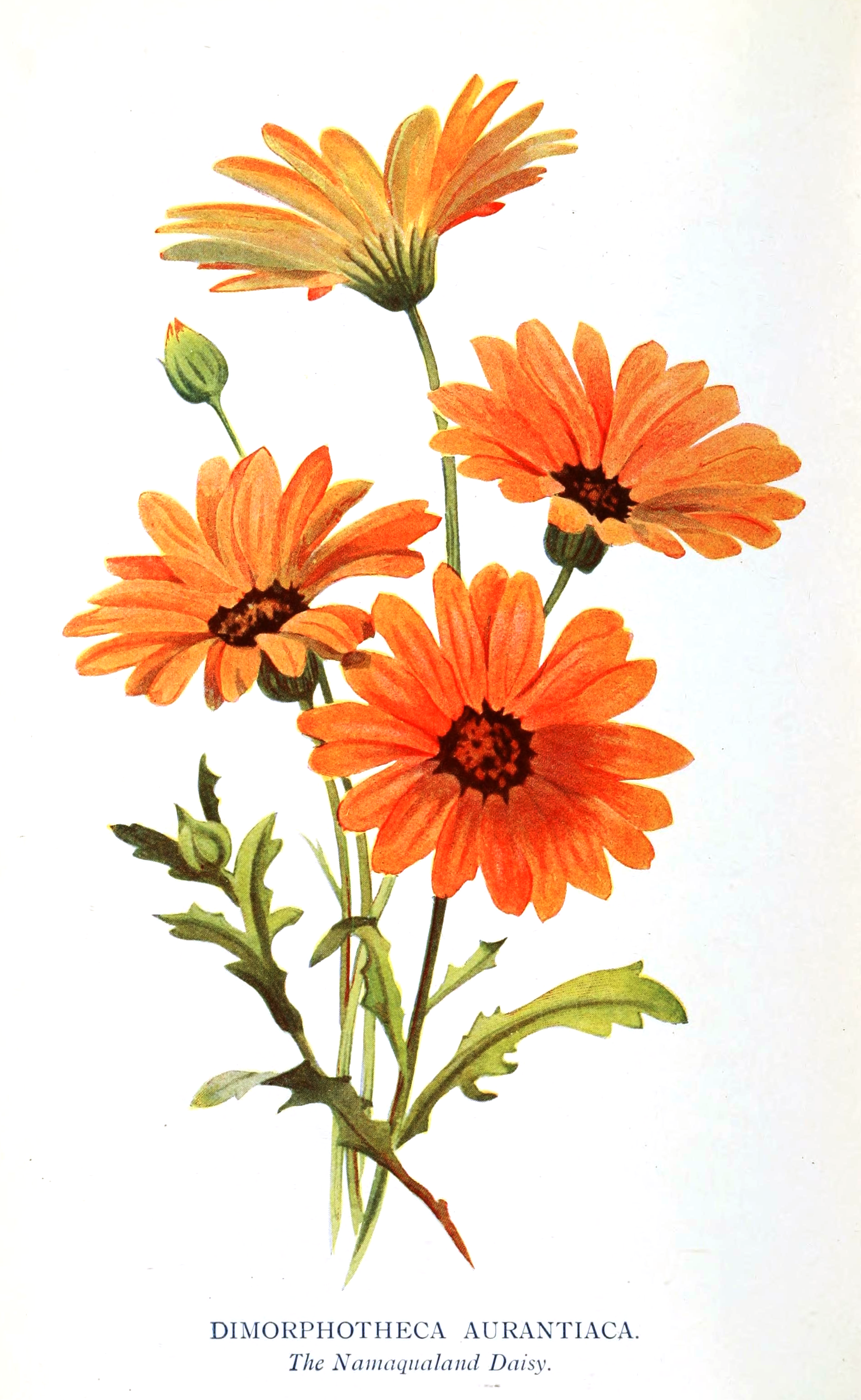

Dimorphotheca sinuata grows in western South Africa and in Namibia, very often in places receiving winter rainfall but also in sandy deserts. It flowers early in spring. It is an annual sometimes exceeding 30 cm (12 inches) in height. Flower heads are generally yellow or orange with purple markings, containing both ray florets and disc florets.

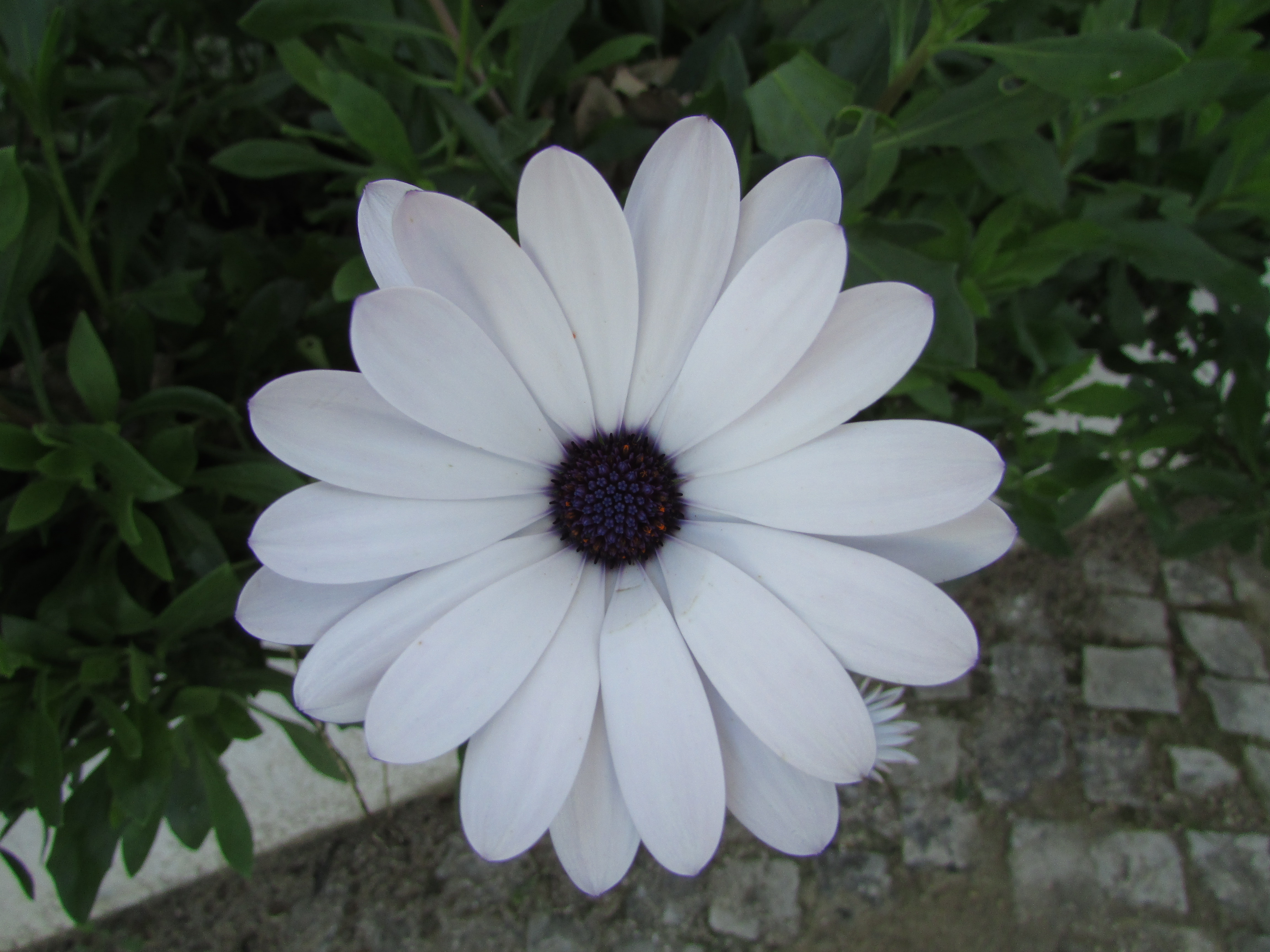
2018-01-15 White African Cape Daisy (Dimorphotheca Sinuata), Albufeira

== See also ==
- Namaqualand Daisies, South Africa field hockey
