= Blyde River Bunters =

South Africa field hockey club

- Full name: Blyde River Bunters
- Nickname(s): Bunters
- League: Premier Hockey League
- Founded: 2016

Personnel
- Coach: Marcelle Keet
Home

Blyde River Bunters is a South Africa field hockey club. The club was established in 2016, and is one of 6 established to compete in South African Hockey Association's new premier domestic competition, Premier Hockey League.

== History ==
The Blyde River Bunters have been inspired by famous tourist areas in Blyde River Canyon Nature Reserve in Mpumalanga.

== Tournament history ==
=== Premier Hockey League ===
- 2016 - (gold)
- 2017 - (bronze)
- 2018 - (gold)
- 2019 - 5th

== Teams ==
The women's team was announced on 10 July 2019.

Head Coach: Marcelle Keet

1. Phumelela Mbande
2. Shindre-Lee Simmons
3. Celia Evans
4. Lauren Nina
5. Courtney du Preez
6. Izelle Verster
7. Nicolene Terblanche
8. Elmien Marais
9. Kaylim Bowers
10. Lelethu Ndakisa
11. Nicole Kemp
12. Marizen Marais
13. Gracious Mpe
14. Cloé de Souza
15. Charmorne Theron
16. Sarah Bingham
17. Meeghan Klomp
19. Hannah Shirley
20. Jessica de Bruyn-Smith
21. Miecke Flemming
31. Thando Mtalana
