= Alexandra Lukin =

New Zealand field hockey player

Personal information
- Born: 29 May 1998 (age 28) Hamilton, New Zealand

Sport
- Sport: Field hockey
- Position: Midfield
National team
Years	Team	Caps	Goals
2019	New Zealand U–21	3	(0)
2022–	New Zealand	10	(1)

Alexandra Lukin (born 29 May 1998) is a field hockey player from New Zealand, who plays as a midfielder.

== Personal life ==
Alexandra Lukin was born in Wellington and raised in Hamilton, New Zealand.

== Career ==
=== Under-21 ===
Alexandra Lukin made her debut for the New Zealand U-21 team in 2019 during a test series against Australia in Hastings.

=== Black Sticks ===
Lukin made her debut for the Black Sticks in 2022 during the Trans–Tasman Hockey Series in Auckland. Later that year she was named in the national squad for both the FIH World Cup in Terrassa and Amsterdam, as well as the XXII Commonwealth Games in Birmingham.
