= Uganda women's national field hockey team =

Uganda
- Association: Uganda Hockey Association
- Confederation: AfHF (Africa)
- Head Coach: Moses Nsereko Christopher
- Manager: Bridgit Baine

FIH ranking
- Current: 77 (5 November 2025)

Africa Cup of Nations
- Appearances: 1 (first in 2022)
- Best result: 8th (2022)

The Uganda women's national field hockey team represents Uganda in women's international field hockey competitions and is controlled by the Uganda Hockey Association, the governing body for field hockey in Uganda. It is ranked 77th in the world by International Hockey federation.

== Tournament record ==
=== Africa Cup of Nations ===
- 2022 – 8th
- 2025 – WD

=== African Olympic Qualifier ===
- 2019 – Withdrew
- 2023 – Withdrew

== Domestic Development and leagues. ==
Uganda's domestic women's hockey scene has grown in recent years. The UHA Women's National League features club sides from across the country competing at the National Hockey Stadium in Lugogo, Kampala. Teams such as Wananchi, Kampala Hockey Club (KHC Swans) and others league titles, supporting talent development and providing feeder opportunities for national selection.

== Junior and Youth Participation ==
Efforts to build the pipeline for the senior women's team include participation in junior continental competitions; Forexample, Uganda's U-21 women's team was officially flagged off to compete at the 2025 Junior Africa Cup in Windhoek, Namibia with hopes of qualifying for the 2025 Junior World Cup in Santiago, Chile.

== Team Composition ==
Squads announced for international fixtures have included players from top Ugandan clubs in domestic league. A 2024 squad for the Zambezi Hockey Series featured players from regional sides such as Weatherhead Hockey Club, Wananchi and KHC Swans demonstrating the depth of women's hockey talent in the country.

== See also ==
- Uganda men's national field hockey team
