= Shirndré-Lee Simmons =

South African field hockey player

Personal information
- Born: Shirndré-Lee Edoline Simmons; 3 June 2000 (age 26) Welkom, South Africa

Sport
- Sport: Field hockey
- Club: Kovsie
National team
Years	Team	Caps	Goals
2022	South Africa U21	10	-
2022-present	South Africa	17	(1)
Medal record
Women's field hockey
Representing South Africa
Africa Cup of Nations
Gold medal – first place	2022 Accra

Shirndré-Lee Edoline Simmons (born 3 July 2000) is a South African field hockey player for the South African national team.

== Personal life ==
She attended St. Michael's School, in Bloemfontein and graduated from University of the Free State as Bachelor of Business Administration in 2022.

== Career ==
=== Under–21 ===
Simmons made her debut for the South Africa U–21 team in 2016, at the Junior Africa Cup in Windhoek. After gaining qualification to the FIH Junior World Cup, she went on to represent the team at the tournament in Santiago.

=== National team ===
Simmons participated at the Hockey Africa Cup of Nations and the 2022 Women's FIH Hockey World Cup. Shortly after this announcement, she was also named in the squad for the Commonwealth Games in Birmingham.
