= Taryn Mallett =

South African field hockey player

Taryn Potts
Personal information
- Full name: Taryn Kate Potts
- Born: 19 April 1992 (age 34) Harare, Zimbabwe

Sport
- Sport: Field hockey
- Position: Defence
- Club: Wanderers
National team
| Years | Team | Caps | Goals |
| 2013 | South Africa U–21 | 6 | (0) |
| 2020– | South Africa | 10 | (0) |
Medal record
Representing South Africa
Women's field hockey

Taryn Kate Potts (née Mallett) (born 19 April 1992) is a field hockey player from South Africa. In 2020, she was an athlete at the Summer Olympics.

== Career ==
=== Under–21 ===
In 2013, Potts made her debut for the South Africa U–21 team at the FIH Junior World Cup in Mönchengladbach.

=== National team ===
Potts made her senior international debut for South Africa in 2020, during a test series against Ireland in Stellenbosch.

Despite only making five appearances for the national team, Potts was named to the South Africa squad for the 2020 Summer Olympics in Tokyo. She will make her Olympic debut on 24 July 2021, in the Pool A match against Ireland.
