= Nepo Serage =

South African field hockey player

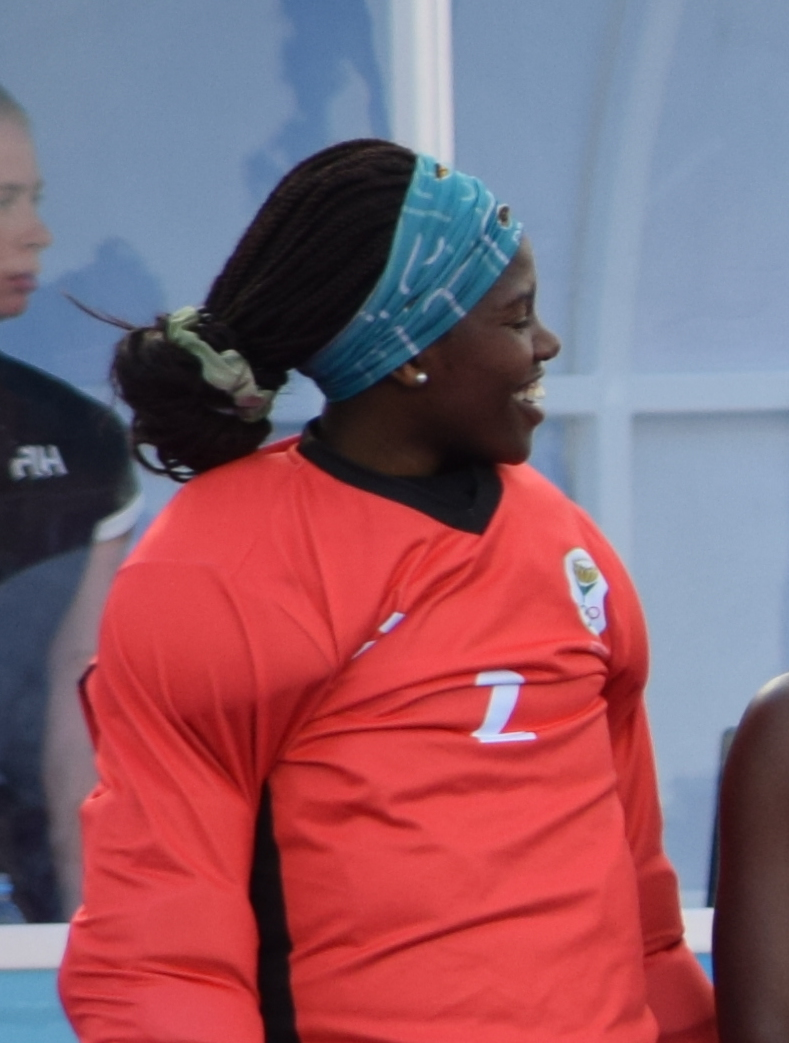
- Semi-finals of Hockey5s, during the 2018 Youth Olympic Games in Buenos Aires.

Personal information
- Born: Maboloke Nepo Serage; 14 April 2000 (age 26) Bethlehem, Free State

Sport
- Sport: Field hockey
- Position: Goalkeeper
- Club: Southern Gauteng
Senior career
Years	Team	Caps	Goals
2019	Namaqualand Daisies	-	-
2018-present	Western Province	-	-
2018-2022	UCT	-	-
National team
Years	Team	Caps	Goals
2022	South Africa U18	7	-
2022-present	South Africa	9	-
2022-present	South African Indoor	11	-
Medal record
Representing South Africa
Women's field hockey
Women's Indoor hockey
- Updated on 2 December 2023

Maboloke Nepo Serage (born 14 April 2000) is a South African field hockey player for the South African national team.

== International career ==
=== Under–18 ===
She participated at the 2018 Summer Youth Olympics.

=== National team ===
Nepo participated at the 2022 Women's FIH Hockey World Cup.

== Personal life ==
She attended Hoërskool Witteberg. In 2022, she graduated from University of Cape Town with a bachelor of science in physiotherapy.
