= Grace Delmotte =

Canadian field hockey player

Personal information
- Full name: Grace Felicity Jean Delmotte
- Born: 26 July 2002 (age 24) North Vancouver, Canada
- Height: 172 cm (5 ft 8 in)

Sport
- Sport: Field hockey
- Position: Midfield
- Club: West Vancouver FHC
National team
Years	Team	Caps	Goals
2019–2023	Canada U–21	9	(0)
2022–	Canada	22	(3)
Medal record
Women's field hockey
Representing Canada

Grace Felicity Jean Delmotte (born 26 July 2002) is a field hockey player from Canada.

== Early life ==
Grace Delmotte was born and raised in North Vancouver, a suburb of Vancouver, in the province of British Columbia in Western Canada.

She is a former student of Wake Forest University.

== Career ==
=== Under–21 ===
In 2019, Delmotte made her international debut at under–21 level. She was a member of the Canada U–21 during a Four–Nations Tournament in Dublin.

Following a four year hiatus from the junior national squad, Delmotte returned to the side in 2023. She represented the team at the Pan American Junior Championship in Saint Michael. She helped the side to a fourth place finish at the tournament.

=== Senior national team ===
Delmotte made her senior international debut for Canada in 2022. She earned her first international cap at the FIH World Cup in Terrassa. During the tournament, she also scored her first international goal. After the FIH World Cup, Delmotte went on to represent Team Canada at the XXII Commonwealth Games in Birmingham.

Since her debut, Delmotte has made sporadic appearances for the national team. She has most recently been named in the squad for the 2025 Pan American Cup in Montevideo.

Major international tournaments

- 2022 FIH World Cup – Terrassa and Amsterdam
- XXII Commonwealth Games – Birmingham
- 2024 FIH Olympic Qualifiers – Valencia
- 2023–24 FIH Nations Cup – Terrassa

== International goals ==
The following is a list of goals scored by Delmotte at international level.

Goal	Date	Location	Opponent	Score	Result	Competition	Ref.
1	7 July 2022	Estadi Olímpic de Terrassa, Terrassa, Spain	Argentina	1–0	1–7	2022 FIH World Cup	
2	2 August 2022	University of Birmingham, Birmingham, England	Ghana	2–0	8–1	XXII Commonwealth Games	
3	2 August 2022	University of Birmingham, Birmingham, England	Ghana	6–0	8–1	XXII Commonwealth Games	
