= Tiffany Jones =

British comic strip

- Author(s): Pat Tourret, Jenny Butterworth
- Current status/schedule: Terminated
- Launch date: 1964; 61 years ago
- End date: 1977; 48 years ago
- Publisher(s): Daily Sketch
- Genre(s): Drama comics

Tiffany Jones is a British newspaper comic strip that ran between 1964 and 1977. It was originally published in the Daily Sketch, then from 1971, when the Daily Sketch merged with the Daily Mail, in the latter.

The series centred on a young woman who travelled to London to become a fashion model. It is notable for being created by two female comic strip artists, Pat Tourret and Jenny Butterworth. The strip portrayed feminist themes and included some erotic fanservice.

The series inspired the 1973 comedy film Tiffany Jones.

Tiffany Jones was listed in 1001 Comics You Should Read Before You Die by Quintessence Editions.
