= Bianca Wood =

South African field hockey player

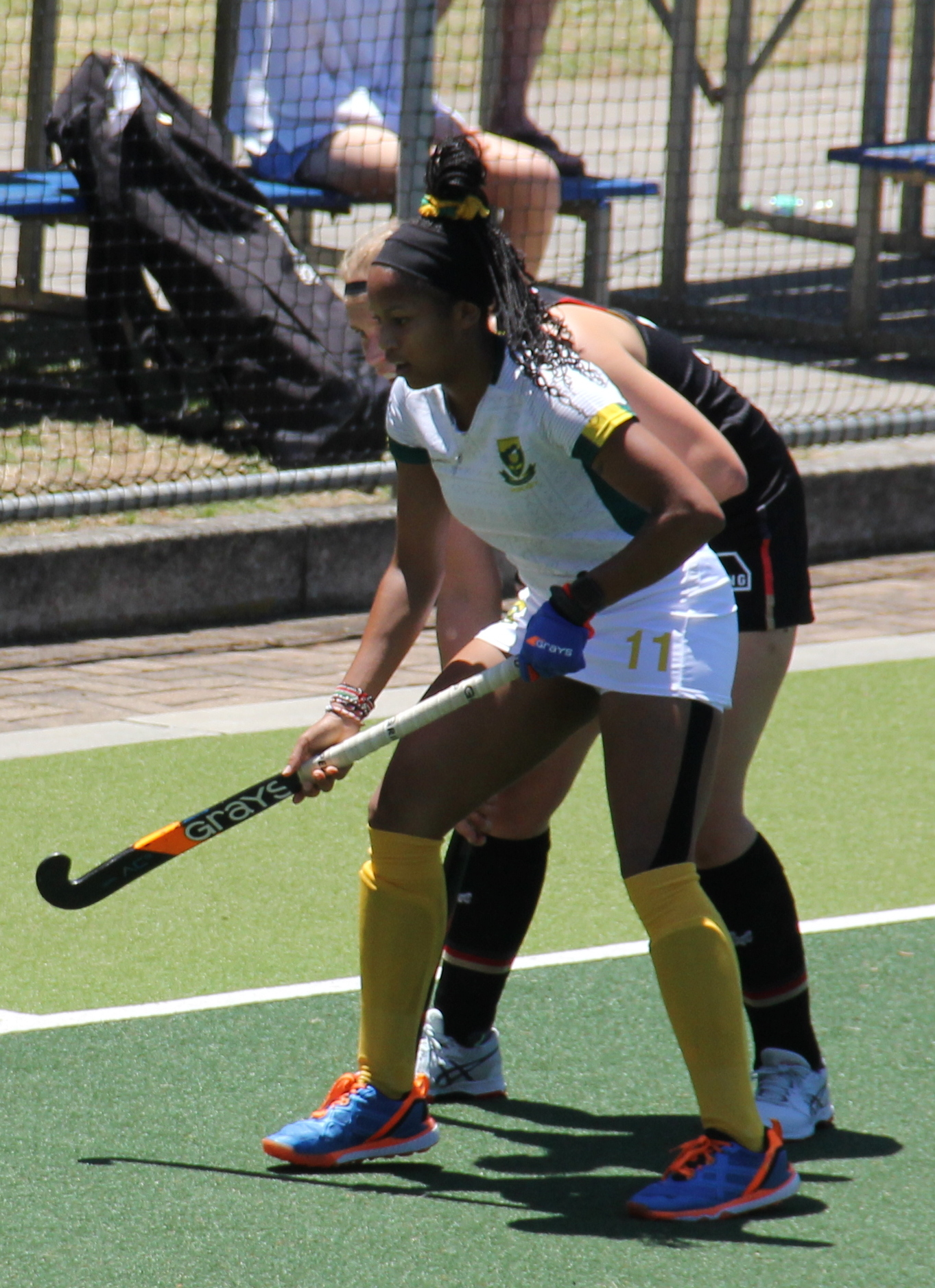
- Test field hockey: South Africa v Germany 26 November 2023

Personal information
- Born: 20 February 2000 (age 26)

Sport
- Sport: Field hockey
- Position: forward
- Club: Old Williamsonian Hockey Club
Senior career
| Years | Team | Caps | Goals |
| 2017-2018 | St. Lucia Lakers | - | - |
| 2019 | Namaqualand Daisies | - | - |
| 2024-Present | Old Williamsonian Hockey Club | - | - |
National team
| Years | Team | Caps | Goals |
| 2020 | South Africa U–21 | 39 | (5) |
| 2019-present | South Africa | 16 | (1) |
Medal record
Women's field hockey
Representing South Africa
- Updated on 6 November 2022

Bianca Wood (born 20 February 2000) is a field hockey player from South Africa.

== Personal life ==
Wood attended Clarendon High School for Girls, East London.

== Career ==
=== Under–21 ===
Wood made her debut for the South Africa U–21 in 2022 at the FIH Junior World Cup in Potchefstroom.

=== National team ===
Wood made her senior international debut for South Africa in 2019, during a test series against Namibia in Randburg. In May 2022, she was named in the squad for the FIH World Cup in Terrassa and Amsterdam. Shortly after this announcement, she was also named in the squad for the Commonwealth Games in Birmingham.

== Awards ==
- 2019 PHL Women - Young Player of the Tournament
