= Stephanie Botha =

South African field hockey player

Personal information
- Born: 30 December 1998 (age 27)

Sport
- Sport: Field hockey
- Position: Defender
- Club: Central
Senior career
| Years | Team | Caps | Goals |
| 2017–2022 | Maties | - | - |
| 2023–2024 | WPCC | - | - |
National team
| Years | Team | Caps | Goals |
| 2022–present | South Africa | 30 | (2) |
Medal record
Representing South Africa
Africa Cup of Nations
| Gold medal – first place | 2022 Accra |
| Gold medal – first place | 2025 Ismailia |

Stephanie Botha (born 30 December 1998) is a South African field hockey player for the South African national team. In 2024 she will become an Olympian, representing South Africa at the XXXIII Olympic Games in Paris.

== Career ==
=== National team ===
Botha made her debut for the Africa Cup of Nations in Accra.

== Personal life ==
She graduated at the Stellenbosch University.
