= Lisa-Marié Deetlefs =

South African field hockey player

Personal information
- Born: 8 September 1987 (age 38) Johannesburg, South Africa
- Height: 1.69 m (5 ft 7 in)
- Weight: 63 kg (139 lb)

Sport
- Sport: Field hockey
- Position: Defender
Senior career
| Years | Team | Caps | Goals |
| 2016–2019 | Madikwe Rangers | - | - |
| 2006-2019 | Southern Gauteng | 17 | - |
National team
| Years | Team | Caps | Goals |
| 2007–present | South Africa | 285 | (44) |
Medal record
Africa Cup of Nations
| Gold medal – first place | 2013 Nairobi |

Lisa-Marié Deetlefs (born 8 September 1987) is a South African field hockey player for the South African national team.

== International career ==
Lisa made her debut for South Africa in 2007 against Canada at Stellenbosch.

She competed in the 2008 and 2012 Summer Olympics, 2010 Commonwealth Games, 2014 Commonwealth Games, 2018 Commonwealth Games and 2022 Commonwealth Games.

Lisa Deetlefs announces retirement from International Hockey on 24 August 2021, reversed her decision to retire from International hockey, 2022 Women's FIH Hockey World Cup.

== Personal life ==
Lisa-Marie Deetlefs currently holds a position as head of hockey at St. Andrew's School for Girls in Johannesburg.

== Club ==
=== Madikwe Rangers ===
- 2019 PHL Women - Player of the tournament
