= Candice Manuel =

South African field hockey player

Personal information
- Born: 12 February 1991 (age 35)
- Height: 1.52 m (5 ft 0 in)
- Weight: 53 kg (117 lb)

Sport
- Sport: Field hockey
- Position: Forward
National team
| Years | Team | Caps | Goals |
| – | South Africa | 61 | (24) |
| 2022-present | South Africa Hockey5 | 4 | - |
Medal record
Representing South Africa
Africa Cup of Nations
| Gold medal – first place | 2017 Ismailia |

Candice Manuel (born 12 February 1991) is a South African field hockey player for the South African national team.

She participated at the 2018 Women's Hockey World Cup.
