= 2022 Women's Hockey Africa Cup of Nations =

International field hockey championship

Tournament details
- Host country: Ghana
- City: Accra
- Dates: 17–23 January
- Teams: 8 (from 1 confederation)
- Venue: Theodosia Okoh Hockey Stadium

Final positions
- Champions: South Africa (7th title)
- Runner-up: Ghana
- Third place: Kenya

Tournament statistics
- Matches played: 19
- Goals scored: 69 (3.63 per match)
- Top scorer: (South Africa) Tarryn Glasby (9 goals)

The 2022 Women's Hockey Africa Cup of Nations was the eighth edition of the Women's Hockey Africa Cup of Nations, the quadrennial international women's field hockey championship of Africa organised by the African Hockey Federation. In February 2021 it was announced that the tournament would be held alongside the men's tournament at the Theodosia Okoh Hockey Stadium in Accra, Ghana from 17 to 23 January 2022.

South Africa were the six-time defending champions, having also won the 2017 edition. They successfully defended their title after beating Ghana in the final. The winner qualified for the 2022 Women's FIH Hockey World Cup.

== Qualification ==
The top two highest-ranked teams in the FIH World Rankings qualified directly for the tournament while the other teams had to play in the regional qualifiers. The top two teams from each of the regional qualifiers qualified for the tournament. The three regions were North-East Africa, North-West Africa, and Central-South Africa.

Dates	Event	Location	Quotas	Qualifiers
—N/a	FIH World Rankings	—N/a	2	Ghana; South Africa
Cancelled	North-West Africa Qualifier	—N/a	1	Nigeria
Cancelled	North-East Africa Qualifier	—N/a	2	Kenya; Uganda
Cancelled	Central-South Africa Qualifier	—N/a	3	Namibia; Zambia; Zimbabwe
Total			8	

== Preliminary round ==
The schedule was published on 14 December 2021.

All times are local (UTC±0).

=== Pool A ===
Pos	Team	Pld	W	D	L	GF	GA	GD	Pts	Qualification
1	South Africa	3	3	0	0	19	0	+19	9	Semi-finals
2	Zimbabwe	3	1	1	1	6	4	+2	4	Semi-finals
3	Namibia	3	1	1	1	4	7	−3	4	
4	Uganda	3	0	0	3	0	18	−18	0	

Source: FIH
Rules for classification: 1) points; 2) matches won; 3) goal difference; 4) goals for; 5) head-to-head result; 6) field goals for.

17 January 2022
07:00

Namibia	3–0	Uganda
Coetzee 40'; Brinkmann 42'; Myburgh 56'	Report

Umpires:
Jonelke Swanepoel (RSA)
Ebitimi Sampou (NGR)

17 January 2022
11:00

South Africa	3–0	Zimbabwe
Du Plessis 9'; Coston 12'; Glasby 57'	Report

Umpires:
Cynthia Clement (GHA)
Liana du Plessis (NAM)

18 January 2022
07:00

Zimbabwe	5–0	Uganda
Elijah 28'; N. Terblanche 30', 52'; Grant 47'; Pope 60'	Report

Umpires:
Liana du Plassis (NAM)
Ebitimi Sampou (NGR)

18 January 2022
15:00

Namibia	0–6	South Africa
	Report	Du Plessis 9'; Botha 24'; Glasby 27', 44'; Fourie 38'; Veto 55'

Umpires:
Bryn Lowe (ZIM)
Binish Hayat (PAK)

20 January 2022
11:00

Zimbabwe	1–1	Namibia
Elijah 43'	Report	Myburgh 51'

Umpires:
Kenneth Tamale (UGA)
Cynthia Clement (GHA)

20 January 2022
17:00

South Africa	10–0	Uganda
Glasby 6', 46', 47', 56'; Fourie 9'; Du Plessis 12', 44'; Simmons 15'; Bobbs 35'; Coston 56'	Report

Umpires:
Ebitimi Sampou (NGR)
Sandra Adell (ESP)

=== Pool B ===
Pos	Team	Pld	W	D	L	GF	GA	GD	Pts	Qualification
1	Ghana (H)	3	2	1	0	11	2	+9	7	Semi-finals
2	Kenya	3	2	0	1	5	6	−1	6	Semi-finals
3	Nigeria	3	1	1	1	5	5	0	4	
4	Zambia	3	0	0	3	1	9	−8	0	

Source: FIH
Rules for classification: 1) points; 2) matches won; 3) goal difference; 4) goals for; 5) head-to-head result; 6) field goals for.
(H) Hosts

17 January 2022
13:00

Ghana	2–2	Nigeria
Opoku 12'; Sarfoa 60'	Report	Njoku 13'; Johnson 55'

Umpires:
Binish Hayat (PAK)
Sandra Adell (ESP)

18 January 2022
09:00

Nigeria	2–1	Zambia
Uddoh 8'; Billo 56'	Report	Nakombe 28'

Umpires:
Kenneth Tamale (UGA)
Cynthia Clement (GHA)

18 January 2022 (Note: The match resulted in a walkover, after the Kenyan team arrived late and did not made it in time for the game.)
11:00

Kenya	0–5	Ghana
	Report

19 January 2022 (Note: The match, originally scheduled on 17 January, was postponed to 19 January.)
09:00

Kenya	3–0	Zambia
Opondo 11'; Mutiva 45'; Bwire 57'	Report

Umpires:
Sandra Adell (ESP)
Jonelke Swanepoel (RSA)

20 January 2022
09:00

Nigeria	1–2	Kenya
Johnson 11'	Report	Opondo 15'; Kemunto 54'

Umpires:
Bryn Lowe (ZIM)
Liana du Plassis (NAM)

20 January 2022
15:00

Ghana	4–0	Zambia
Opoku 4'; Narkuor 10', 39'; Berko 42'	Report

Umpires:
Charity Majimbo (KEN)
Jonelke Swanepoel (RSA)

== Classification round ==
=== Bracket ===
Semi-finals
21 January
Namibia (p.s.o.)	2 (3)
Zambia	2 (2)
21 January
Nigeria	4
Uganda	0

Fifth place
23 January
Namibia	0
Nigeria	1
Seventh place
23 January
Zambia	2
Uganda	1

=== 5–8th place semi-finals ===
21 January 2022
11:15

Namibia	2–2	Zambia
Semedo 19'; Louis 35'	Report	Nakombe 49'; Kalomo 58'
Penalties
Myburgh (penalty shoot-out missed); Van Rooyen (penalty shoot-out scored); Semedo (penalty shoot-out scored); Brinkmann (penalty shoot-out missed); Kruger (penalty shoot-out scored)	3–2	(penalty shoot-out scored) Mambwe; (penalty shoot-out missed) Nakombe; (penalty shoot-out scored) Mudenda; (penalty shoot-out missed) Mutangama; (penalty shoot-out missed) Kalomo

Umpires:
Charity Majimbo (KEN)
Bryn Lowe (ZIM)

21 January 2022
13:30

Nigeria	4–0	Uganda
Njoku 8'; John 23'; Billo 27'; Johnson 36'	Report

Umpires:
Cynthia Clement (GHA)
Liana du Plessis (NAM)

=== Seventh place game ===
23 January 2022
07:30

Zambia	2–1	Uganda
Kalomo 3', 13'	Report	Thuwaibah 49'

Umpires:
Ebitimi Sampou (NGR)
Liana du Plassis (NAM)

=== Fifth place game ===
23 January 2022
09:45

Namibia	0–1	Nigeria
	Report	John 27'

Umpires:
Charity Majimbo (KEN)
Bryn Lowe (ZIM)

== Knockout stage ==
=== Bracket ===
Semi-finals
21 January
South Africa	4
Kenya	0
21 January
Ghana	2
Zimbabwe	1

Final
23 January
South Africa	3
Ghana	1
Third place
23 January
Kenya (p.s.o.)	0 (3)
Zimbabwe	0 (1)

=== Semi-finals ===
21 January 2022
15:45

South Africa	4–0	Kenya
Bobbs 21'; Glasby 39', 60'; Maddocks 55'	Report

Umpires:
Binish Hayat (PAK)
Ebitimi Sampou (NGR)

21 January 2022
18:00

Ghana	2–1	Zimbabwe
Umaru 25'; Opoku 0'	Report	A. Terblanche 15'

Umpires:
Sandra Adell (ESP)
Kenneth Tamale (UGA)

=== Third place game ===
23 January 2022
12:00

Kenya	0–0	Zimbabwe
	Report
Penalties
Kuira (penalty shoot-out scored); Makokha (penalty shoot-out missed); Owiti (penalty shoot-out scored); Chebet (penalty shoot-out scored)	3–1	(penalty shoot-out missed) Williams; (penalty shoot-out missed) Grant; (penalty shoot-out scored) Elijah; (penalty shoot-out missed) Levey

Umpires:
Cynthia Clement (GHA)
Kenneth Tamale (UGA)

=== Final ===
23 January 2022
16:30

South Africa	3–1	Ghana
Maddocks 15'; Paton 23'; Du Plessis 55'	Report	Opoku 6'

Umpires:
Sandra Adell (ESP)
Binish Hayat (PAK)

== Final ranking ==
Rank	Team
1st place, gold medalist(s)	South Africa
2nd place, silver medalist(s)	Ghana
3rd place, bronze medalist(s)	Kenya
4	Zimbabwe
5	Nigeria
6	Namibia
7	Zambia
8	Uganda

Qualified for the 2022 Women's FIH Hockey World Cup

== Goalscorers ==
There were 69 goals scored in 19 matches, for an average of 3.63 goals per match.

9 goals

- (South Africa) Tarryn Glasby

5 goals

- (South Africa) Lilian du Plessis

4 goals

- (Ghana) Elizabeth Opoku

3 goals

- (Nigeria) Benedicta Johnson
- (Zambia) Catherine Kalomo

2 goals

- (Ghana) Vivian Narkuor
- (Kenya) Aurelia Opondo
- (Namibia) Taramarie Myburgh
- (Nigeria) Esther Billo
- (Nigeria) Alfa John
- (Nigeria) QueenEsther Njoku
- (South Africa) Quanita Bobbs
- (South Africa) Bernadette Coston
- (South Africa) Tegan Fourie
- (South Africa) Charné Maddocks
- (Zambia) Carol Nakombe
- (Zimbabwe) Tinodiwanashe Elijah
- (Zimbabwe) Natalie Terblanche

1 goal

- (Ghana) Mavis Berko
- (Ghana) Martha Sarfoa
- (Ghana) Nafisatu Umaru
- (Kenya) Grace Bwire
- (Kenya) Naomi Kemunto
- (Kenya) Flavia Mutiva
- (Namibia) Sascha Brinkmann
- (Namibia) Anthea Coetzee
- (Namibia) Ina Louis
- (Namibia) Tisha Semedo
- (Nigeria) Precious Uddoh
- (South Africa) Stephanie Botha
- (South Africa) Shirndré-Lee Simmons
- (South Africa) Kristen Paton
- (South Africa) Nomnikelo Veto
- (Uganda) Kiggundu Thuwaibah
- (Zimbabwe) Nicolle Grant
- (Zimbabwe) Lilian Pope
- (Zimbabwe) Alexi Terblanche

Source: FIH

== See also ==
- 2022 Men's Hockey Africa Cup of Nations
