= Ongeziwe Mali =

South African field hockey player

Personal information
- Born: 21 May 1999 (age 27) Port Elizabeth, Cape Province, South Africa
- Height: 1.51 m (4 ft 11 in)
- Weight: 52 kg (115 lb)

Sport
- Sport: Field hockey
- Position: Forward
- Club: Maties
National team
Years	Team	Caps	Goals
2016	South Africa U21	5	-
2018–	South Africa	24	-
Medal record
Women's field hockey
Representing South Africa
Africa Cup of Nations
Gold medal – first place	2025 Ismailia

Ongeziwe Mali (born 21 May 1999) is a South African field hockey player for the South African national team.

She participated at the 2018 Women's Hockey World Cup.

== Honours ==
=== Maties ===
- 2023 USSA A Tournament - Player of the tournament, Top goal scorer of the tournament

=== South Africa ===
- 2019 Women's African Olympic Qualifier - Player of the Tournament
