= Nicole Walraven =

South African field hockey player

Personal information
- Born: 12 December 1994 (age 31)
- Height: 1.68 m (5 ft 6 in)
- Weight: 68 kg (150 lb)

Sport
- Sport: Field hockey
- Position: Defender / Midfielder
- Club: Phoenix Hockey Club
National team
Years	Team	Caps	Goals
2015 to current	South Africa	52	(5)

Nicole Walraven (born 12 December 1994) is a South African field hockey player for the South African national team.

She participated at the 2018 Women's Hockey World Cup.
