= Nomnikelo Veto =

South African field hockey player

Personal information
- Born: 3 January 1997 (age 29) Gqeberha, South Africa

Sport
- Sport: Field hockey
- Position: Forward
- Club: CUS Torino (Italy)
Senior career
Years	Team	Caps	Goals
2018-2019	University of the Witwatersrand	18	-
2022-present	CUS Torino	-	-
National team
Years	Team	Caps	Goals
2016	South Africa U–21	5	(4)
2019–	South Africa	18	(5)
Medal record
Africa Cup of Nations
Gold medal – first place	2022 Accra
Junior Africa Cup
Gold medal – first place	2016 Windhoek

Nomnikelo Veto (born 3 January 1997) is a field hockey player from South Africa. In 2020, she was an athlete at the Summer Olympics.

== Personal life ==
Nomnikelo Veto was born in Gqeberha, and grew up in the neighbouring suburb of Walmer.

== Career ==
=== International experience ===
In the summer of 2021, after the Summer Olympics in Tokyo, Veto went to Italy to play for Cus Torino in Italian Serie A1. She scored the first goal of the season against Butterfly Rome. She scored five other goals in the first part of the season: 3 in Serie A1 and 2 in Coppa Italia.

=== Under–21 ===
In 2016, Veto made her debut for the South Africa U–21 team at the Junior Africa Cup in Windhoek.

=== National team ===
Veto made her senior international debut for South Africa in 2019, during a test series against Namibia in Randburg. She followed this up with a series of appearances throughout the year, most notably at the FIH Series Finals in Valencia.

Following her series of international appearances in 2019, Veto was named to the South Africa squad for the 2020 Summer Olympics in Tokyo. She made her Olympic debut on 24 July 2021, in the Pool A match against Ireland.
