= Robyn Johnson (field hockey) =

South African field hockey player

Personal information
- Born: 7 December 1990 (age 35)

Sport
- Sport: Field hockey
- Position: Midfielder
- Club: WITS
Senior career
Years	Team	Caps	Goals
2017-2019	Wineland Wings	15	-
2017-present	Southern Gauteng	25	-
2017	University of Johannesburg	5	-
2018-present	University of the Witwatersrand	9	-
National team
Years	Team	Caps	Goals
2019-2023	South African	46	(1)
2017-2023	South African Indoor	66	(25)
Medal record
Representing South Africa
Women's field hockey
Africa Cup of Nations
Gold medal – first place	2022 Accra
Women's Indoor hockey
Indoor Africa Cup
Silver medal – second place	2021 Durban
- Updated on 6 November 2023

Robyn Johnson (born 7 December 1990) is a South African field hockey player for the South African national team.

Johnson made her senior international debut for South Africa in 2017, during a test series against Zimbabwe in Durban. She participated at the 2020 Summer Olympics.

She retired from her international career post the both indoor and outdoor hockey on 16 November 2025.
