= Toni Marks =

South African field hockey player

Personal information
- Full name: Toni Marks
- Born: 19 July 1994 (age 32) Gqeberha, South Africa

Sport
- Sport: Field hockey
- Position: Forward
National team
Years	Team	Caps	Goals
2013	South Africa U–21	6	(1)
2014–	South Africa	16	(8)
2022-present	South Africa Hockey5	8	(8)
Medal record
Representing South Africa
Women's field hockey

Toni Marks (born 19 July 1994) is a field hockey player from South Africa. In 2020, she was an athlete at the Summer Olympics.

== Personal life ==
Toni Marks was born and raised in Gqeberha.

== Career ==
=== Under–21 ===
In 2013, Marks made her debut for the South Africa U–21 team at the FIH Junior World Cup in Mönchengladbach.

=== National team ===
Marks made her senior international debut for South Africa in 2014, during a test series against Scotland in Pretoria. From her debut until 2017, Marks only appeared sporadically in the national team.

Although she hadn't made an appearance for the national team in over four years, Marks was named to the South Africa squad for the 2020 Summer Olympics in Tokyo. She made her Olympic debut on 24 July 2021, in the Pool A match against Ireland.
