= Hannah Pearce =

South African field hockey player

Personal information
- Born: 17 November 1998 (age 27) Johannesburg, South Africa

Sport
- Sport: Field hockey
- Position: Defender
- Club: University of Birmingham
Youth career
- Years: Team
- -2016: St Mary's School
Senior career
| Years | Team | Caps | Goals |
| 2017-2022 | Harvard | - | - |
| 2023–present | Birmingham | - | - |
National team
| Years | Team | Caps | Goals |
| 2019–present | South African national team | 30 | - |
Medal record
Women's field hockey
Representing South Africa
Africa Cup of Nations
| Gold medal – first place | 2025 Ismailia |

Hannah Pearce (born 17 November 1998) is a South African field hockey player for the South African national team and the University of Birmingham Hockey Club in the Women's England Hockey League Premier Division.

== Personal life ==
She attended St Mary's School, studied at the Harvard University.

== National team ==
She successful debut in the South Africa v Namibia is Randburg. Shortly after this announcement, she was also named in the squad for the African Hockey Road to Tokyo Event.

Pearce participated at the 2022 Women's FIH Hockey World Cup, she was also named in the squad for the Commonwealth Games in Birmingham.
