= Quanita Bobbs =

South African field hockey player

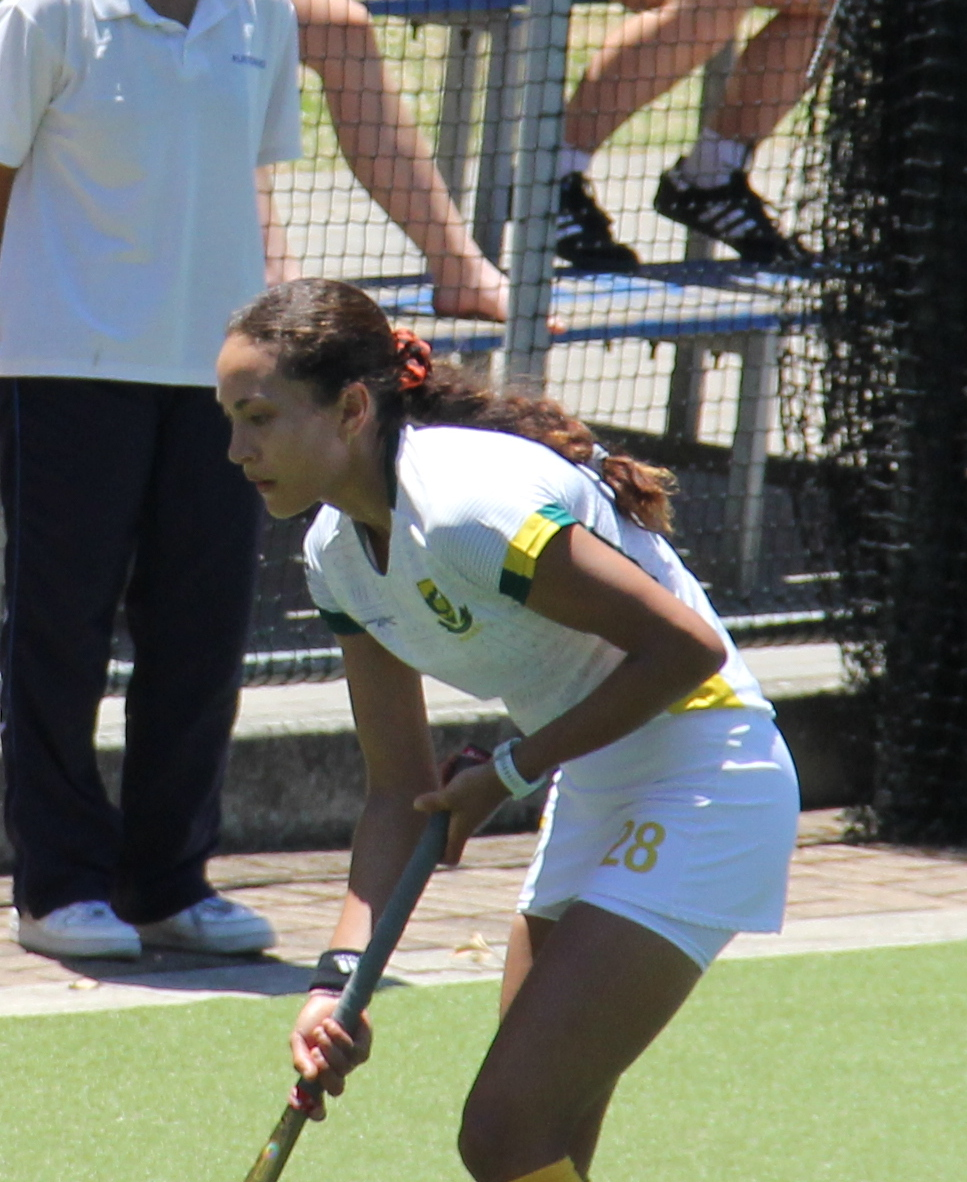
- Test matches RSA v GER 2023

Personal information
- Born: 3 September 1993 (age 32)
- Height: 1.73 m (5 ft 8 in)
- Weight: 58 kg (128 lb)

Sport
- Sport: Field hockey
- Position: Midfielder
- Club: Central
National team
Years	Team	Caps	Goals
2010	South Africa U18	6	(0)
2013	South Africa U21	6	(3)
2012–	South Africa	200	(38)
Medal record
Africa Cup of Nations
Gold medal – first place	2013 Nairobi
Gold medal – first place	2017 Ismailia
Gold medal – first place	2022 Accra
Gold medal – first place	2025 Ismailia
- Updated on 15 October 2025

Quanita Bobbs (born 3 September 1993) is a South African field hockey player for the South African national team.

She participated at the 2018 Women's Hockey World Cup. She lost the opening match against Germany 3-1 but She was going to play at the Tokyo Olympics, but the event got postponed due to COVID-19. However, she still participated in 2021, when the Olympics took place.
