= Simoné Gouws =

South African field hockey player

Personal information
- Born: 28 February 1999 (age 27)

Sport
- Sport: Field hockey
- Position: Midfielder
- Club: Bonner THV
National team
Years	Team	Caps	Goals
2018–	South Africa	5	-

Simoné Gouws (born 28 February 1999) is a South African field hockey player for the South African national team.

She participated at the 2018 Women's Hockey World Cup.
