= Dirkie Chamberlain =

South African field hockey player

Personal information
- Born: 3 November 1986 (age 39) Pretoria, South Africa
- Height: 1.68 m (5 ft 6 in)
- Weight: 67 kg (148 lb)

Sport
- Sport: Field hockey
- Position: Forward
- Club: HGC
National team
Years	Team	Caps	Goals
2006-2024	South Africa	250	(130)
2022-2024	South Africa Hockey5	10	(13)
Medal record
Women's field hockey
Representing South Africa
African Cup of Nations
Gold medal – first place	2017 Ismailia
- Updated on 10 August 2024

Dirkie Chamberlain (born 3 November 1986) is a South African field hockey player.

== International career ==
Chamberlain is a 1x Olympian, played 4 World Cups, 3 Commonwealth Games.

At the 2012 Summer Olympics, she competed with the South Africa women's national field hockey team in the women's tournament. She has also competed at the 2010 and 2014 Commonwealth Games. and 2018 Commonwealth Games.

Chamberlain currently plays at the HGC. In the past, has also played various European leagues; with clubs including Holcombe Hockey Club, Kampong (Dutch Hoofdklasse), Canterbury HC (Investec English Premier League) and Gantoise HC (Belgium Honour Division).

She retired from her international career post the Olympic Games.

== Personal life ==
Chamberlain began playing hockey when she was 13. She is openly lesbian.
