= Charné Maddocks =

South African field hockey player

Personal information
- Full name: Charné Lynn Maddocks
- Born: 10 June 1998 (age 28) Kimberley, South Africa

Sport
- Sport: Field hockey
- Position: Forward
- Club: Central
National team
Years	Team	Caps	Goals
2020–	South Africa	21	(2)
Medal record
Africa Cup of Nations
Gold medal – first place	2022 Accra
- Updated on 9 September 2024

Charné Lynn Maddocks (born 10 June 1998) is a field hockey player from South African. In 2020, she was an athlete at the Summer Olympics.

== Personal life ==
Charné Maddocks was born and raised in Kimberley, South Africa. Her brother, Melrick, also represents South Africa in field hockey.

Maddocks is a student at North-West University in Potchefstroom.

== Career ==
=== National team ===
Despite never having made an international appearance, Maddocks was named to the South Africa squad for the 2020 Summer Olympics in Tokyo.

She will make her international and Olympic debut on 24 July 2021, in the Pool A match against Ireland.
