= Tarryn Glasby =

South African field hockey player

Tarryn Lombard
Personal information
- Born: Tarryn Glasby; 23 January 1995 (age 31)

Sport
- Sport: Field hockey
- Club: WPCC
Senior career
| Years | Team | Caps | Goals |
| 2016-present | Western Province | - | - |
| ?-present | WPCC | - | - |
| 2017-2019 | Wineland Wings | - | - |
National team
| Years | Team | Caps | Goals |
| 2016-2024 | South Africa | 91 | (45) |
| 2013-2016 | South Africa U21 | 16 | (15) |
Medal record
Representing South Africa
Women's field hockey
Africa Cup of Nations
| Gold medal – first place | 2017 Ismailia |
| Gold medal – first place | 2022 Accra |
Junior Africa Cup
| Gold medal – first place | 2016 Windhoek |
- Updated on 16 November 2024

Tarryn Lombard (née Glasby; born 23 January 1995) is a South African field hockey player for the South African national team.

== International career ==
=== Under-21 ===
She participated in the 2013, and 2016 Women's Hockey Junior World Cup and the 2016 Junior Africa Cup for Nations.

=== National team ===
She participated in the 2018 and 2022 Women's Hockey World Cup.

She retired from her international career post the Olympic Games.

== Personal life ==
She attended El Shaddai Christian School, in Durbanville and graduated from Stellenbosch University as Bachelor of Commerce in 2017.
