= 2022 Women's FIH Hockey World Cup =

Copa Mundial feminina de hockey sobre hierba 2022 Wereldkampioenschap hockey voor vrouwen 2022
- Where legends are made

Tournament details
- Host countries: Spain; Netherlands
- Cities: Terrassa; Amstelveen
- Dates: 1–17 July
- Teams: 16 (from 5 confederations)
- Venue(s): Estadi Olímpic de Terrassa; Wagener Stadium

Final positions
- Champions: Netherlands (9th title)
- Runner-up: Argentina
- Third place: Australia

Tournament statistics
- Matches played: 44
- Goals scored: 149 (3.39 per match)
- Top scorer: (Argentina) Agustina Gorzelany (8 goals)
- Best player: (Argentina) María José Granatto
- Best young player: (Belgium) Charlotte Englebert
- Best goalkeeper: (Argentina) Belén Succi

The 2022 Women's FIH Hockey World Cup was the 15th edition of the Women's FIH Hockey World Cup, the quadrennial world championship for women's national field hockey teams organized by the International Hockey Federation. It was held from 1 to 17 July 2022 at the Estadi Olímpic de Terrassa in Terrassa, Spain and at the Wagener Stadium in Amstelveen, the Netherlands.

Defending champions the Netherlands won the tournament for a record ninth time after defeating Argentina 3–1 in the final. Australia won the third place match by defeating Germany 2–1.

== Host selection ==
The International Hockey Federation announced in December 2018 that the 2022 FIH Hockey World Cups will be held either in July 2022 or January 2023. The FIH received the following final five bids for the Women's 2022 World Cup. In November 2019, it was announced that Spain and the Netherlands would host the tournament in July 2022.

For the preferred time window 1–17 July 2022:

- Germany
- Netherlands & Spain
- Spain

For the preferred time window 13–29 January 2023:

- Australia (withdrew)
- India (withdrew)
- Malaysia
- New Zealand

== Qualification ==
Just as in 2018, 16 teams competed in the tournament. Alongside the hosts, Spain and the Netherlands, the five continental champions received an automatic berth. After the postponement of the 2020 Summer Olympics the quota of places available through continental championships including the World Cup hosts was increased from six to sixteen.

Dates	Event	Location	Quotas	Qualifier(s)
8 November 2019	Hosts	—N/a	2	Netherlands (1); Spain (7)
4–13 June 2021	2021 EuroHockey Championship	Amstelveen, Netherlands	3	Belgium (5); England (4); Germany (6)
21–24 October 2021	2021 European Qualifier	Pisa, Italy	1	Ireland (12)
17–23 January 2022	2022 Africa Cup of Nations	Accra, Ghana	1	South Africa (15)
21–28 January 2022	2022 Asia Cup	Muscat, Oman	4	China (13); India (8); Japan (10); South Korea (11)
19–29 January 2022	2022 Pan American Cup	Santiago, Chile	3	Argentina (2); Canada (14); Chile (17)(Debut)
Cancelled (Note: The Oceania Cup could not be completed before the qualification deadline due to travel restrictions related to the COVID-19 pandemic. Therefore the two Oceania quota places have been filled based on the FIH Women's World Ranking.)	2022 Oceania Cup	Whangārei, New Zealand	2	Australia (3); New Zealand (9)
Total			16	

== Venues ==
Following is a list of all venues and host cities.

2022 Women's FIH Hockey World Cup is located in Europe	Amstelveen	Terrassa
2022 Women's FIH Hockey World Cup is located in Europe	Wagener Stadium	Estadi Olímpic de Terrassa
2022 Women's FIH Hockey World Cup is located in Europe	Capacity: 9,000	Capacity: 11,500

== Draw ==
The draw took place on 17 February 2022.

=== Seeding ===
As the hosts, Netherlands and Spain played in their countries until the quarter-final. Therefore, they were allocated in different sides of the pools but in the rows corresponding to their World Ranking. Based on that ranking, Netherlands was positioned as A1 and Spain as C2. The top four teams according to the world ranking and qualified to the event were allocated in the first row as the headers of each pool.

Pot 1	Pot 2	Pot 3	Pot 4
Netherlands (assigned to A1); England (assigned to B1); Argentina (assigned to C1); Australia (assigned to D1)	Germany; Belgium; New Zealand; Spain (assigned to C2)	India; Japan; South Korea; Ireland	China; Canada; South Africa; Chile

== Umpires ==
On 29 November 2021, 18 umpires were appointed by the FIH for this tournament.

- Amber Church (NZL)
- Laurine Delforge (BEL)
- Maggie Giddens (USA)
- Hannah Harrison (ENG)
- Kelly Hudson (NZL)
- Kang Hyun-young (KOR)
- Alison Keogh (IRL)
- Ivona Makar (CRO)
- Ayanna McClean (TTO)
- Michelle Meister (GER)
- Catalina Montesino (CHI)
- Aleisha Neumann (AUS)
- Irene Presenqui (ARG)
- Annelize Rostron (RSA)
- Cookie Tan (SGP)
- Wanri Venter (RSA)
- Sarah Wilson (SCO)
- Emi Yamada (JPN)

== First round ==
The match schedule was announced on 3 December 2020.

All times are local (UTC+2).

=== Pool A ===
Pos	Team	Pld	W	D	L	GF	GA	GD	Pts	Qualification
1	Netherlands (H)	3	3	0	0	11	3	+8	9	Quarter-finals
2	Germany	3	2	0	1	8	4	+4	6	Cross-overs
3	Chile	3	1	0	2	3	7	−4	3	Cross-overs
4	Ireland	3	0	0	3	1	9	−8	0	

Source: FIH
Rules for classification: 1) points; 2) matches won; 3) goal difference; 4) goals for; 5) head-to-head result; 6) field goals scored.
(H) Hosts

2 July 2022
16:30

Germany	4–1	Chile
Heinz 9'; Stapenhorst 22', 55'; Schröder 44'	Report	Krimerman 27'

Wagener Stadium, Amstelveen
Umpires:
Ivona Makar (CRO)
Emi Yamada (JPN)

2 July 2022
19:30

Netherlands	5–1	Ireland
Matla 17', 44'; Jansen 35'; Plönissen 41'; Verschoor 46'	Report	Upton 37'

Wagener Stadium, Amstelveen
Umpires:
Kang Hyun-young (KOR)
Maggie Giddens (USA)

3 July 2022
19:30

Germany	1–3	Netherlands
Lorenz 57'	Report	Keetels 13'; Moes 48'; Verschoor 50'

Wagener Stadium, Amstelveen
Umpires:
Aleisha Neumann (AUS)
Laurine Delforge (BEL)

5 July 2022
14:00

Ireland	0–1	Chile
	Report	Krimerman 48'

Wagener Stadium, Amstelveen
Umpires:
Wanri Venter (RSA)
Ivona Makar (CRO)

6 July 2022
16:30

Ireland	0–3	Germany
	Report	Lorenz 24'; Stapenhorst 37'; Zimmermann 57'

Wagener Stadium, Amstelveen
Umpires:
Annelize Rostron (RSA)
Maggie Giddens (USA)

6 July 2022
19:30

Netherlands	3–1	Chile
Welten 14'; Jansen 42'; De Goede 52'	Report	Tala 21'

Wagener Stadium, Amstelveen
Umpires:
Irene Presenqui (ARG)
Emi Yamada (JPN)

=== Pool B ===
Pos	Team	Pld	W	D	L	GF	GA	GD	Pts	Qualification
1	New Zealand	3	2	1	0	9	6	+3	7	Quarter-finals
2	England	3	1	1	1	4	4	0	4	Cross-overs
3	India	3	0	2	1	5	6	−1	2	Cross-overs
4	China	3	0	2	1	3	5	−2	2	

Source: FIH
Rules for classification: 1) points; 2) matches won; 3) goal difference; 4) goals for; 5) head-to-head result; 6) field goals scored.

2 July 2022
14:00

New Zealand	2–2	China
Tynan 24'; Merry 48'	Report	Zhang Y. 33'; Gu 43'

Wagener Stadium, Amstelveen
Umpires:
Laurine Delforge (BEL)
Wanri Venter (RSA)

3 July 2022
16:30

England	1–1	India
Petter 9'	Report	Vandana 28'

Wagener Stadium, Amstelveen
Umpires:
Annelize Rostron (RSA)
Irene Presenqui (ARG)

5 July 2022
16:30

India	1–1	China
Vandana 45'	Report	Zheng 26'

Wagener Stadium, Amstelveen
Umpires:
Aleisha Neumann (AUS)
Kang Hyun-young (KOR)

5 July 2022
19:30

New Zealand	3–1	England
Doar 29', 39'; Davey 51'	Report	Owsley 4'

Wagener Stadium, Amstelveen
Umpires:
Maggie Giddens (USA)
Emi Yamada (JPN)

7 July 2022
16:30

England	2–0	China
Balsdon 10'; Ansley 27'	Report

Wagener Stadium, Amstelveen
Umpires:
Wanri Venter (RSA)
Irene Presenqui (ARG)

7 July 2022
19:30

India	3–4	New Zealand
Vandana 4'; Lalremsiami 44'; Gurjit 59'	Report	Merry 12', 54'; Jopp 29'; Davies 32'

Wagener Stadium, Amstelveen
Umpires:
Laurine Delforge (BEL)
Kang Hyun-young (KOR)

=== Pool C ===
Pos	Team	Pld	W	D	L	GF	GA	GD	Pts	Qualification
1	Argentina	3	3	0	0	15	2	+13	9	Quarter-finals
2	Spain (H)	3	2	0	1	9	6	+3	6	Cross-overs
3	South Korea	3	1	0	2	4	10	−6	3	Cross-overs
4	Canada	3	0	0	3	4	14	−10	0	

Source: FIH
Rules for classification: 1) points; 2) matches won; 3) goal difference; 4) goals for; 5) head-to-head result; 6) field goals scored.
(H) Hosts

1 July 2022
21:30

Spain	4–1	Canada
Iglesias 5'; Giné 21'; López García 26'; García Grau 29'	Report	Johansen 57'

Estadi Olímpic de Terrassa, Terrassa
Umpires:
Ayanna McClean (TTO)
Hannah Harrison (ENG)

2 July 2022
18:00

Argentina	4–0	South Korea
Gorzelany 2', 28'; V. Granatto 21'; Jankunas 39'	Report

Estadi Olímpic de Terrassa, Terrassa
Umpires:
Michelle Meister (GER)
Alison Keogh (IRL)

3 July 2022
18:00

South Korea	3–2	Canada
Kim M. 1'; Kim S. 49'; Cho 57'	Report	Secco 2'; Stairs 56'

Estadi Olímpic de Terrassa, Terrassa
Umpires:
Michelle Meister (GER)
Kelly Hudson (NZL)

3 July 2022
21:30

Spain	1–4	Argentina
García Grau 51'	Report	Gorzelany 39', 44'; Raposo 40'; M. Granatto 60'

Estadi Olímpic de Terrassa, Terrassa
Umpires:
Sarah Wilson (SCO)
Alison Keogh (IRL)

7 July 2022
18:00

Argentina	7–1	Canada
Jankunas 10'; V. Granatto 16'; M. Granatto 21'; Albertario 32'; Forcherio 48'; Gorzelany 48', 51'	Report	Delmotte 6'

Estadi Olímpic de Terrassa, Terrassa
Umpires:
Ivona Makar (CRO)
Catalina Montesino (CHI)

7 July 2022
21:30

South Korea	1–4	Spain
Lee S. 12'	Report	García Grau 8'; Giné 20'; Jiménez 33'; S. Barrios 53'

Estadi Olímpic de Terrassa, Terrassa
Umpires:
Amber Church (NZL)
Cookie Tan (SGP)

=== Pool D ===
Pos	Team	Pld	W	D	L	GF	GA	GD	Pts	Qualification
1	Australia	3	3	0	0	6	1	+5	9	Quarter-finals
2	Belgium	3	2	0	1	7	3	+4	6	Cross-overs
3	South Africa	3	0	1	2	5	9	−4	1	Cross-overs
4	Japan	3	0	1	2	3	8	−5	1	

Source: FIH
Rules for classification: 1) points; 2) matches won; 3) goal difference; 4) goals for; 5) head-to-head result; 6) field goals scored.

2 July 2022
21:30

Australia	2–0	Japan
Williams 56'; Malone 60'	Report

Estadi Olímpic de Terrassa, Terrassa
Umpires:
Kelly Hudson (NZL)
Cookie Tan (SGP)

3 July 2022
15:00

Belgium	4–1	South Africa
Vanden Borre 17', 18'; Englebert 53', 57'	Report	Du Toit 24'

Estadi Olímpic de Terrassa, Terrassa
Umpires:
Catalina Montesino (CHI)
Hannah Harrison (ENG)

5 July 2022
18:00

Japan	3–3	South Africa
Y. Nagai 3'; Toriyama 9'; Nishikori 34'	Report	Paton 38'; Lombard 55', 59'

Estadi Olímpic de Terrassa, Terrassa
Umpires:
Catalina Montesino (CHI)
Cookie Tan (SGP)

5 July 2022
21:30

Belgium	0–2	Australia
	Report	Hayes 39'; Greiner 40'

Estadi Olímpic de Terrassa, Terrassa
Umpires:
Kelly Hudson (NZL)
Hannah Harrison (ENG)

6 July 2022
18:00

Japan	0–3	Belgium
	Report	Vanden Borre 24', 40'; Ballenghien 44'

Estadi Olímpic de Terrassa, Terrassa
Umpires:
Amber Church (NZL)
Kelly Hudson (NZL)

6 July 2022
21:30

Australia	2–1	South Africa
Squibb 8'; Malone 24'	Report	Du Plessis 13'

Estadi Olímpic de Terrassa, Terrassa
Umpires:
Ivona Makar (CRO)
Hannah Harrison (ENG)

== Classification ==
=== 9–16th place quarterfinals ===
10 July 2022
13:00

Ireland	2–0	South Africa
Hawkshaw 19'; Upton 31'	Report

Wagener Stadium, Amstelveen
Umpires:
Irene Presenqui (ARG)
Aleisha Neumann (AUS)

10 July 2022
15:30

China	3–0	Chile
Ma 45+'; Zhong 49'; Cui 56'	Report

Wagener Stadium, Amstelveen
Umpires:
Annelize Rostron (RSA)
Maggie Giddens (USA)

11 July 2022
18:00

Japan	3–2	South Korea
Kobayakawa 19'; Nishikori 44'; H. Nagai 60+'	Report	Jung 22', 51'

Estadi Olímpic de Terrassa, Terrassa
Umpires:
Kelly Hudson (NZL)
Ayanna McClean (TTO)

11 July 2022
21:30

Canada	1–1	India
Secco 11'	Report	Salima 58'
Penalties
Woodcroft (penalty shoot-out scored); Secco (penalty shoot-out missed); Sourisseau (penalty shoot-out scored); Leahy (penalty shoot-out missed); Faiczak (penalty shoot-out missed); Woodcroft (penalty shoot-out missed); Sourisseau (penalty shoot-out missed); Leahy (penalty shoot-out missed)	2–3	(penalty shoot-out missed) Salima; (penalty shoot-out missed) Neha; (penalty shoot-out scored) Navneet; (penalty shoot-out scored) Sonika; (penalty shoot-out missed) Lalremsiami; (penalty shoot-out missed) Navneet; (penalty shoot-out missed) Sonika; (penalty shoot-out scored) Neha

Estadi Olímpic de Terrassa, Terrassa
Umpires:
Michelle Meister (GER)
Alison Keogh (IRE)

=== 13–16th place classification ===
12 July 2022
12:00

South Africa	0–1	Chile
	Report	Urroz 44'

Wagener Stadium, Amstelveen
Umpires:
Maggie Giddens (USA)
Kang Hyun-young (KOR)

13 July 2022
14:00

Canada	0–0	South Korea
	Report
Penalties
Woodcroft (penalty shoot-out missed); Secco (penalty shoot-out missed); Mollenhauer (penalty shoot-out missed)	0–3	(penalty shoot-out scored) Kim S. (penalty shoot-out scored) Cheon; (penalty shoot-out scored) Seo

Estadi Olímpic de Terrassa, Terrassa
Umpires:
Cookie Tan (SGP)
Ayanna McClean (TTO)

=== 9–12th place classification ===
12 July 2022
14:30

Ireland	1–3	China
Carey 59'	Report	Chen Yang 7'; Zhong 49'; Chen Yanh. 52'

Wagener Stadium, Amstelveen
Umpires:
Emi Yamada (JPN)
Annelize Rostron (RSA)

13 July 2022
16:30

India	3–1	Japan
Navneet 30', 45'; Grace 38'	Report	Asai 20'

Estadi Olímpic de Terrassa, Terrassa
Umpires:
Ivona Makar (CRO)
Kelly Hudson (NZL)

== Second round ==
=== Bracket ===
Cross-overs
9 July – Amstelveen
Belgium	5
Chile	0
10 July – Terrassa
Spain	1
India	0
9 July – Amstelveen
Germany	1
South Africa	0
10 July – Terrassa
England	5
South Korea	0

Quarter-finals
12 July – Amstelveen
Netherlands	2
Belgium	1
13 July – Terrassa
Australia	2
Spain	0
12 July – Amstelveen
New Zealand	0
Germany	1
13 July – Terrassa
Argentina	1
England	0

Semi-finals
16 July – Terrassa
Netherlands	1
Australia	0
16 July – Terrassa
Germany	2 (2)
Argentina	2 (4)

Final
17 July – Terrassa
Netherlands	3
Argentina	1
Third place
17 July – Terrassa
Australia	2
Germany	1

=== Cross-overs ===
9 July 2022
17:00

Germany	1–0	South Africa
Lorenz 38'	Report

Wagener Stadium, Amstelveen
Umpires:
Laurine Delforge (BEL)
Emi Yamada (JPN)

9 July 2022
19:30

Belgium	5–0	Chile
Vanden Borre 6', 15'; Rasir 14'; Englebert 20', 31'	Report

Wagener Stadium, Amstelveen
Umpires:
Irene Presenqui (ARG)
Annelize Rostron (RSA)

10 July 2022
18:00

England	5–0	South Korea
Ansley 17', 26'; Howard 20'; Martin 54'; Rayer 56'	Report

Estadi Olímpic de Terrassa, Terrassa
Umpires:
Ayanna McClean (TTO)
Alison Keogh (IRE)

10 July 2022
21:30

Spain	1–0	India
Segú 57'	Report

Estadi Olímpic de Terrassa, Terrassa
Umpires:
Amber Church (NZL)
Sarah Wilson (SCO)

=== Quarter-finals ===
12 July 2022
17:00

New Zealand	0–1	Germany
	Report	Micheel 17'

Wagener Stadium, Amstelveen
Umpires:
Wanri Venter (RSA)
Laurine Delforge (BEL)

12 July 2022
19:30

Netherlands	2–1	Belgium
Leurink 15'; Moes 48'	Report	Gerniers 38'

Wagener Stadium, Amstelveen
Umpires:
Irene Presenqui (ARG)
Aleisha Neumann (AUS)

13 July 2022
19:00

Argentina	1–0	England
V. Granatto 47'	Report

Estadi Olímpic de Terrassa, Terrassa
Umpires:
Amber Church (NZL)
Alison Keogh (IRE)

13 July 2022
21:30

Australia	2–0	Spain
Taylor 3', 41'	Report

Estadi Olímpic de Terrassa, Terrassa
Umpires:
Sarah Wilson (SCO)
Hannah Harrison (ENG)

=== Semi-finals ===
16 July 2022
18:30

Netherlands	1–0	Australia
Matla 42'	Report

Estadi Olímpic de Terrassa, Terrassa
Umpires:
Sarah Wilson (SCO)
Laurine Delforge (BEL)

16 July 2022
21:30

Germany	2–2	Argentina
Granitzki 1'; Stapenhorst 45'	Report	Gorzelany 15'; Albertario 28'
Penalties
Lorenz (penalty shoot-out missed); Schröder (penalty shoot-out scored); Weidemann (penalty shoot-out missed); Zimmermann (penalty shoot-out scored)	2–4	(penalty shoot-out missed) Jankunas; (penalty shoot-out scored) Albertario; (penalty shoot-out scored) Thome; (penalty shoot-out scored) Alonso; (penalty shoot-out scored) Sánchez Moccia

Estadi Olímpic de Terrassa, Terrassa
Umpires:
Aleisha Neumann (AUS)
Amber Church (NZL)

=== Third place match ===
17 July 2022
18:30

Australia	2–1	Germany
Kershaw 49', 56'	Report	Micheel 14'

Estadi Olímpic de Terrassa, Terrassa
Umpires:
Alison Keogh (IRL)
Irene Presenqui (ARG)

=== Final ===
17 July 2022
21:30

Netherlands	3–1	Argentina
Verschoor 17'; Matla 24'; Albers 36'	Report	Gorzelany 46'

Estadi Olímpic de Terrassa, Terrassa
Umpires:
Amber Church (NZL)
Sarah Wilson (SCO)

== Final standings ==
Pos	Grp	Team	Pld	W	D	L	GF	GA	GD	Pts	Final result
1st place, gold medalist(s)	A	Netherlands (H)	6	6	0	0	17	5	+12	18	Gold medal
2nd place, silver medalist(s)	C	Argentina	6	4	1	1	19	7	+12	13	Silver medal
3rd place, bronze medalist(s)	D	Australia	6	5	0	1	10	3	+7	15	Bronze medal
4	A	Germany	7	4	1	2	13	8	+5	13	Fourth place
5	B	New Zealand	4	2	1	1	9	7	+2	7	Eliminated in quarterfinals
6	D	Belgium	5	3	0	2	13	5	+8	9	Eliminated in quarterfinals
7	C	Spain (H)	5	3	0	2	10	8	+2	9	Eliminated in quarterfinals
8	B	England	5	2	1	2	9	5	+4	7	Eliminated in quarterfinals
9	B	India	6	1	3	2	9	8	+1	6	Ninth place
9	B	China	5	2	2	1	9	6	+3	8	Ninth place
11	D	Japan	5	1	1	3	7	13	−6	4	Eleventh place
11	A	Ireland	5	1	0	4	4	12	−8	3	Eleventh place
13	A	Chile	6	2	0	4	4	15	−11	6	Thirteenth place
13	C	South Korea	6	1	1	4	6	18	−12	4	Thirteenth place
15	D	South Africa	6	0	1	5	5	13	−8	1	Fifteenth place
15	C	Canada	5	0	2	3	5	15	−10	2	Fifteenth place

Source: FIH
(H) Hosts

== Goalscorers ==
There were 149 goals scored in 44 matches, for an average of 3.39 goals per match.

8 goals

- (Argentina) Agustina Gorzelany

6 goals

- (Belgium) Stéphanie Vanden Borre

4 goals

- (Belgium) Charlotte Englebert
- (Germany) Charlotte Stapenhorst
- (Netherlands) Frédérique Matla

3 goals

- (Argentina) Victoria Granatto
- (England) Giselle Ansley
- (Germany) Nike Lorenz
- (India) Vandana Katariya
- (Netherlands) Maria Verschoor
- (New Zealand) Olivia Merry
- (Spain) Begoña García Grau

2 goals

- (Argentina) Agustina Albertarrio
- (Argentina) Maria Granatto
- (Argentina) Julieta Jankunas
- (Australia) Stephanie Kershaw
- (Australia) Ambrosia Malone
- (Australia) Renee Taylor
- (Canada) Madeline Secco
- (Chile) Denise Krimerman
- (China) Zhong Jiaqi
- (Germany) Lena Micheel
- (India) Navneet Kaur
- (Ireland) Róisín Upton
- (Japan) Emi Nishikori
- (Netherlands) Yibbi Jansen
- (Netherlands) Freeke Moes
- (New Zealand) Katie Doar
- (South Africa) Tarryn Lombard
- (South Korea) Jung Che-young
- (Spain) Xantal Giné

1 goal

- (Argentina) Emilia Forcherio
- (Argentina) Valentina Raposo
- (Australia) Rebecca Greiner
- (Australia) Greta Hayes
- (Australia) Penny Squibb
- (Australia) Mariah Williams
- (Belgium) Ambre Ballenghien
- (Belgium) Alix Gerniers
- (Belgium) Justine Rasir
- (Canada) Grace Delmotte
- (Canada) Karli Johansen
- (Canada) Brienne Stairs
- (Chile) Francisca Tala
- (Chile) Manuela Urroz
- (China) Chen Yang
- (China) Chen Yanhua
- (China) Cui Qiuxia
- (China) Gu Bingfeng
- (China) Ma Ning
- (China) Zhang Ying
- (China) Zheng Jiali
- (England) Grace Balsdon
- (England) Tessa Howard
- (England) Hannah Martin
- (England) Lily Owsley
- (England) Isabelle Petter
- (England) Elena Rayer
- (Germany) Hanna Granitzki
- (Germany) Pauline Heinz
- (Germany) Anne Schröder
- (Germany) Sonja Zimmermann
- (India) Deep Grace Ekka
- (India) Gurjit Kaur
- (India) Lalremsiami
- (India) Salima Tete
- (Ireland) Michelle Carey
- (Ireland) Sarah Hawkshaw
- (Japan) Yu Asai
- (Japan) Shiho Kobayakawa
- (Japan) Hazuki Nagai
- (Japan) Yuri Nagai
- (Japan) Mai Toriyama
- (Netherlands) Felice Albers
- (Netherlands) Eva de Goede
- (Netherlands) Marloes Keetels
- (Netherlands) Laurien Leurink
- (Netherlands) Sabine Plönissen
- (Netherlands) Lidewij Welten
- (New Zealand) Tarryn Davey
- (New Zealand) Frances Davies
- (New Zealand) Tessa Jopp
- (New Zealand) Rose Tynan
- (South Africa) Lilian du Plessis
- (South Africa) Jean-Leigh du Toit
- (South Africa) Kristen Paton
- (South Korea) Cho Hye-jin
- (South Korea) Kim Min-ji
- (South Korea) Kim Seo-na
- (South Korea) Lee Seung-ju
- (Spain) Sara Barrios
- (Spain) Belén Iglesias
- (Spain) Lucía Jiménez Vicente
- (Spain) María López García
- (Spain) Marta Segú

Source: FIH

== Awards ==
The awards were announced on 17 July 2022.

Award	Player
Player of the tournament	(Argentina) María José Granatto
Top goalscorer	(Argentina) Agustina Gorzelany
Goalkeeper of the tournament	(Argentina) Belén Succi
Young player of the tournament	(Belgium) Charlotte Englebert

== See also ==
- 2022 Women's FIH Indoor Hockey World Cup
- 2022 Women's FIH Hockey Junior World Cup
- 2023 Men's FIH Hockey World Cup
