= Sulette Damons =

South African field hockey player

Personal information
- Born: 7 September 1989 (age 36) Graaff-Reinet, South Africa
- Height: 1.63 m (5 ft 4 in)
- Weight: 62 kg (137 lb)

Sport
- Sport: Field hockey
- Position: Forward
National team
Years	Team	Caps	Goals
2010–2018	South Africa	198	(31)
Medal record
African Cup of Nations
Gold medal – first place	2013 Nairobi
Gold medal – first place	2017 Ismailia
- Updated on 2 April 2022

Sulette Damons (born 30 October 1989) is a South African field hockey player. At the 2012 Summer Olympics she competed with the South Africa women's national field hockey team in the women's tournament. She was also part of the South African team at the 2014 and 2018 Commonwealth Games. She made her debut for the national team in 2010 against Argentina.
