= Lilian du Plessis =

South African field hockey player

Personal information
- Born: 17 December 1992 (age 33)
- Height: 1.68 m (5 ft 6 in)
- Weight: 62 kg (137 lb)

Sport
- Sport: Field hockey
Senior career
Years	Team	Caps	Goals
-2019	Southern Gauteng	-	-
-2019	Crusaders	-	-
2021-present	KZN Coastals	-	-
National team
Years	Team	Caps	Goals
2013	South Africa u21	6	(1)
2014-present	South Africa	145	(55)
2018-present	South Africa Indoor	13	(5)
Medal record
Women's field hockey
Representing South Africa
Africa Cup of Nations
Gold medal – first place	2013 Nairobi
Gold medal – first place	2017 Ismailia
Gold medal – first place	2022 Accra

Lilian du Plessis (born 17 December 1992) is a South African field hockey player for the South African national team.

She participated at the 2020 Summer Olympics. and the 2018 Women's Hockey World Cup.

== Honours ==
=== Provincial ===
==== Southern Gauteng ====
- Indoor IPT: Ladies 2017 - Leading Goalscorer

==== KZN Raiders ====
- 2021 Women's Inter-Provincial Tournament - Leading Goalscorer

=== International ===
- African Hockey Championships 2015 - Leading Goalscorer
- Africa Cup of Nations 2013 - Leading Goalscorer
- African Hockey Road to Tokyo 2020 - Leading Goalscorer
