= Kristen Paton =

South African field hockey player, Double Olympian

Personal information
- Born: 21 December 1996 (age 29)
- Height: 1.64 m (5 ft 5 in)
- Weight: 60 kg (132 lb)

Sport
- Sport: Field hockey
- Position: Midfielder
- Club: HGC
Youth career
- Years: Team
- 2017: Southern Gauteng u21
Senior career
Years	Team	Caps	Goals
2017-2021	University of Johannesburg	-	-
2018-2021	Southern Gauteng	-	-
National team
Years	Team	Caps	Goals
2014	South Africa Hockey5s u18	12	(4)
2016	South Africa u21	10	(2)
2017–2026	South Africa	80	(9)
Medal record
Africa Cup of Nations
Gold medal – first place	2017 Ismailia
Gold medal – first place	2022 Accra
Junior Africa Cup
Gold medal – first place	2016 Windhoek
- Updated on 14 April 2026

Kristen Storm Paton (born 21 December 1996) is a South African field hockey player who plays as midfielder for the South African national team.

== Career ==
=== Under–18 ===
Paton made her debut for the South Africa U–18 in 2014 at the Youth Olympic Games in Nanjing.

=== Under–21 ===
Paton made her debut for the South Africa U–21 in 2016 at the Junior Africa cup for Nations in Windhoek.

=== National team ===
She was in the South Africa team at the 2018 Women's Hockey World Cup.

She retired (2026) from international field hockey career.
