= Men's African Olympic Qualifier =

International field hockey tournament

- Most recent season or competition: 2023 Men's African Olympic Qualifier
- Formerly: All-Africa Games
- Sport: Field hockey
- Founded: 2007; 19 years ago
- First season: 2007
- No. of teams: 8
- Confederation: AfHF (Africa)
- Most recent champion: South Africa (5th title) (2023)
- Most titles: South Africa (5 titles)

The Men's African Olympic Qualifier is the African qualification tournament for the men's field hockey event at the Summer Olympics. It is held every four years and was introduced after field hockey was removed from the All-Africa Games program. The first edition was held in Nairobi, Kenya simultaneously with the 2007 All-Africa Games.

== Results ==
=== Summaries ===
Year	Host	Final			Third place match			Number of teams
Year	Host	Winner	Score	Runner-up	Third place	Score	Fourth place	Number of teams
2007; Details	Nairobi, Kenya	South Africa	2–1	Egypt	Kenya	3–2	Ghana	6
2011; Details	Bulawayo, Zimbabwe	South Africa	1–0	Egypt	Ghana	5–1	Kenya	6
2015; Details	Randburg, South Africa	South Africa	4–2	Egypt	Kenya	4–3	Ghana	9
2019; Details	Stellenbosch, South Africa	South Africa	Round-robin	Egypt	Ghana	Round-robin	Zimbabwe	6
2023; Details	Pretoria, South Africa	South Africa	2–1	Egypt	Ghana	7–1	Uganda	8

=== Top four statistics ===
Team	Winners	Runners-up	Third place	Fourth place
South Africa	5 (2007, 2011, 2015*, 2019*, 2023*)			
Egypt		5 (2007, 2011, 2015, 2019, 2023)		
Ghana			3 (2011, 2019, 2023)	2 (2007, 2015)
Kenya			2 (2007*, 2015)	1 (2011)
Zimbabwe				1 (2019)
Uganda				1 (2023)

* = host nation

=== Team appearances ===
Nation	(Kenya) 2007	(Zimbabwe) 2011	(South Africa) 2015	(South Africa) 2019	(South Africa) 2023	Total
Botswana	–	–	9th	–	–	1
Egypt	2nd	2nd	2nd	2nd	2nd	5
Ghana	4th	3rd	4th	3rd	3rd	5
Kenya	3rd	4th	3rd	5th	6th	5
Morocco	–	6th	–	–	–	1
Namibia	–	–	7th	6th	–	2
Nigeria	5th	–	5th	WD	5th	3
South Africa	1st	1st	1st	1st	1st	5
Tanzania	–	–	8th	–	–	1
Uganda	6th	–	–	WD	4th	2
Zambia	–	–	–	–	7th	1
Zimbabwe	–	5th	6th	4th	8th	4
Total	6	6	9	6	8	

== See also ==
- Field hockey at the African Games
- Men's Hockey Africa Cup of Nations
- Women's African Olympic Qualifier
