= Michael Omondi =

Kenyan field hockey player

Michael Omondi Jakoyo (October 10, 1961 – September 17, 2008) was a field hockey midfielder and Olympic competitor from Kenya.

He died in Nairobi.

== Hockey career ==
He played High School hockey for Kisumu Boys' School. At the club level, he captained the now defunct Barclays Bank hockey club.

He competed for the Kenya national field hockey team at the 1984 Olympics and 1988 Olympics. He was also part of the Kenyan team that won gold at the 1987 All-Africa Games held in Nairobi. He is also gold medalist from the Africa Junior Championship held in 1982 in Kenya.

He captained Kenya at the 1989 Hockey African Cup for Nations. At the last match there, Kenya needed a win over Egypt in order to qualify for the 1990 Hockey World Cup. Egypt equalised at the last moment, prompting Omondi to protest fiercely. As a consequence, Omondi was banned from playing hockey for two years. Omondi subsequently quit his playing career.

== Coaching career ==
After retirement, he had a career in coaching, he was the head coach of USIU-A hockey club and Kenya women's national field hockey team. He was also the Match Secretary of Kenya Hockey Union.

== Death ==
He died on September 17, 2008, at the Kenyatta National Hospital in Nairobi after a short illness.
