= Women's African Olympic Qualifier =

Field hockey qualifier

- Most recent season or competition: 2023 Women's African Olympic Qualifier
- Formerly: All-Africa Games
- Sport: Field hockey
- Founded: 2007; 19 years ago
- First season: 2007
- No. of teams: 8
- Confederation: AfHF (Africa)
- Most recent champion: South Africa (5th title) (2023)
- Most titles: South Africa (5 titles)

The Women's African Olympic Qualifier is the qualification tournament for the women's field hockey event at the Summer Olympics. It is held every four years and was introduced after field hockey was removed from the All-Africa Games program. The first edition was held in Nairobi, Kenya simultaneously with the 2007 All-Africa Games.

== Results ==
=== Summaries ===
| Year | Host | Final | | | Third place match | | | Number of teams |
| Year | Host | Winner | Score | Runner-up | Third place | Score | Fourth place | Number of teams |
|---|---|---|---|---|---|---|---|---|
| 2007; Details | Nairobi, Kenya | South Africa | 5–0 | Kenya | Ghana | 2–1 | Nigeria | 6 |
| 2011; Details | Bulawayo, Zimbabwe | South Africa | 5–0 | Kenya | Ghana | 1–1 (4–3 p.s.o.) | Zimbabwe | 4 |
| 2015; Details | Randburg, South Africa | South Africa | Round-robin | Ghana | Kenya | Round-robin | Namibia | 7 |
| 2019; Details | Stellenbosch, South Africa | South Africa | Round-robin | Ghana | Zimbabwe | Round-robin | Kenya | 5 |
| 2023; Details | Pretoria, South Africa | South Africa | 9–0 | Nigeria | Kenya | 3–1 | Ghana | 7 |

=== Top four statistics ===
| Team | Winners | Runners-up | Third place | Fourth place |
|---|---|---|---|---|
| South Africa | 5 (2007, 2011, 2015*, 2019*, 2023*) | | | |
| Ghana | | 2 (2015, 2019) | 2 (2007, 2011) | 1 (2023) |
| Kenya | | 2 (2007*, 2011) | 2 (2015, 2023) | 1 (2019) |
| Nigeria | | 1 (2023) | | 1 (2007) |
| Zimbabwe | | | 1 (2019) | 1 (2011*) |
| Namibia | | | | 1 (2015) |

* = host nation

=== Team appearances ===
| Nation | (Kenya) 2007 | (Zimbabwe) 2011 | (South Africa) 2015 | (South Africa) 2019 | (South Africa) 2023 | Total |
|---|---|---|---|---|---|---|
| Ghana | 3rd | 3rd | 2nd | 2nd | 4th | 5 |
| Kenya | 2nd | 2nd | 3rd | 4th | 3rd | 5 |
| Namibia | 6th | – | 4th | 5th | 5th | 4 |
| Nigeria | 4th | – | 6th | WD | 2nd | 3 |
| South Africa | 1st | 1st | 1st | 1st | 1st | 5 |
| Tanzania | – | – | 7th | – | – | 1 |
| Uganda | – | – | – | WD | WD | 0 |
| Zambia | – | – | – | – | 6th | 1 |
| Zimbabwe | 5th | 4th | 5th | 3rd | 7th | 5 |
| Total | 6 | 4 | 7 | 5 | 7 | |

== See also ==
- Men's African Olympic Qualifier
- Women's Hockey Africa Cup of Nations
- Field hockey at the African Games
