= Zimbabwe men's national field hockey team =

Team that represents Zimbabwe in the sport of field hockey

Zimbabwe
- Association: Hockey Association of Zimbabwe
- Confederation: AfHF (Africa)
- Head Coach: N Milner
- Manager: P Mwale
- Captain: B Huer
| Home | Away |

FIH ranking
- Current: 89 (4 October 2026)
- Highest: 41 (2003)
- Lowest: 41 (January 2017)

Olympic Games
- Appearances: 1 (first in 1964)
- Best result: 12th (1964)

Africa Cup of Nations
- Appearances: 5 (first in 1983)
- Best result: (bronze) 3rd (2000)

African Games
- Appearances: 5 (first in 1987)
- Best result: (silver) 2nd (1987)
Medal record
Friendship Games
| Bronze medal – third place | 1984 Poznań | Team |
All-Africa Games
| Silver medal – second place | 1987 Nairobi | Team |
| Bronze medal – third place | 1991 Cairo | Team |
Africa Cup of Nations
| Bronze medal – third place | 2000 Bulawayo | Team |

The Zimbabwe men's national field hockey team is the team that represents Zimbabwe in the sport of field hockey. Field hockey has the second biggest player base in the country after football. Currently, Zimbabwe has four pitches, two in Bulawayo – one water base and one sand filled – and another sand filled at the Arundel School and water base at St John's College in the capital city of Harare. Bulawayo has approximately 1,000 hockey players and Harare 8,000. The 5,000-capacity Khumalo Hockey Stadium in Bulawayo is their home stadium. Field hockey club Skies Hockey Club also use the venue for home games. They are currently ranked 61st in International hockey ranking. While the country had a tradition in the sport, they struggled in recent times largely due to their inability to participate in international competitions organized by the African Hockey Federation (AfHF) and the International Hockey Federation (FIH), until the Khumalo Hockey Stadium was refurbished and played host to the 2011 African Olympic Qualifier.

The governing body for field hockey is Hockey Association of Zimbabwe. It was formed in 1925.

== Medals table ==
| Rank | Nation | Gold | Silver | Bronze | Total |
|---|---|---|---|---|---|
| 1 | All-Africa Games | 0 | 1 | 1 | 2 |
| 2 | Friendship Games | 0 | 0 | 1 | 1 |
| 2 | Hockey Africa Cup of Nations | 0 | 0 | 1 | 1 |
| Totals (3 entries) | | 0 | 1 | 3 | 4 |

== History ==
=== Early years ===
Back when the country was Rhodesia, the national hockey team qualified for the 1964 Olympics in Tokyo after beating the United Arab Republic. Team captain Lloyd Koch was Rhodesia's flag bearer, and the team won one game against New Zealand. Koch scored two goals in the tournament.

=== 1980s – Rise in Africa after Independence ===
Zimbabwe got independence in 1980. Soon after independence, various attempts were made to establish sports in the country. Women's team won the inaugural Gold medal in 1980 Olympics. Men's team picked the graph and went on to perform decent in the International games. They won silver and bronze medals in 1987 and 1991 All-Africa Games respectively. The team also bagged bronze medal in Hockey African Cup for Nations in 2000 by defeating Ghana. They managed to hold a strong position in the African continent for almost two decades.

=== Decline and re-establishment ===
Zimbabwe saw a drought in sports after the year 2000. They couldn't manage to maintain their spot in the African region and fall down to sixth in the continental ranking. To revive the game of hockey in the country, 2011 African Olympic Qualifier were organised in Zimbabwe. But the problem was the stadium was not ready by that time. Zimbabwe asked help from South Africa. On 8 July 2011 The Hockey Association of Zimbabwe announced that the ship with the containers holding the new carpet for the Khumalo Hockey Stadium (KHS) was due to dock in Durban, South Africa. Chairman of the Hockey Olympic Qualifiers local organising committee Gavin Stephens said in a statement that the carpet should be delivered to Bulawayo by 16 July.

"This will keep the project on course for commissioning by the end of July. It is understood that the Ministry of Public Works is rushing to meet the deadline, with their work schedule lagging behind."

In response to a call from the Matabeleland Hockey Board (MHB), approximately 60–70 people arrived at the Khumalo Hockey Stadium on Saturday, 2 July 2011. About 20 of these were labourers from Petra School, Burger & McBean and Precast Concrete Products. The other 50 were made up of hockey players, parents of hockey players, and members of general public.

The Minister of Education, Sport, Arts and Culture, David Coltart, arrived to lend his support, while both current and former national and provincial hockey players were also present. Zimbabwe performed poorly in the tournament and lost 4 out of 5 games with a draw against Morocco. Later on, Zimbabwe hosted African Hockey Club of Championship in 2014 and won silver medal after losing to Kenya by 7–0.

=== 2015–2018 ===
Since then, Zimbabwe are regularly organizing local competitions and events. They registered their biggest win in 2015 African Olympic Qualifier by defeating Botswana by 19–0. Matthew Williams scored record 6 goals in the game, becoming first Zimbabwean ever to score more than 5 goals in a match. He emerged as highest scorer for Zimbabwe in the tournament by scoring 11 goals. In 2018, Zimbabwe played a 5 match test series against their arch rivals Namibia and lost all the games. Tendayi Maredza, who is currently the skipper of the team is regarded as one of the finest players in the African continent. Maredza was included in the International XI side that toured South Africa in 2016. Pritchard Matambo has emerged as the unsung hero having defended the team for more than a decade.

=== 2018–19 Men's Hockey Series Open ===
The 2018–19 Men's Hockey Series Open was the first stage of the 2018–19 edition of the Hockey Series. It was held from June to December 2018. Zimbabwe participated and hosted the Bulawayo pool. Despite being the hosts, the Chevrons failed to qualify for the Olympic qualifiers and lost the spot to Egypt. Tatenda Kanyangarara emerged as highest scorer for Zimbabwe.

== Tournament history ==
=== Summer Olympics ===
- 1964 – 12th place

=== Friendship Games ===
- 1984 – (bronze)

=== African Games ===
- 1987 – (silver)
- 1991 – (bronze)
- 1995 – 4th place
- 1999 – 4th place
- 2003 – 5th place

=== Hockey Africa Cup of Nations ===
- 1989 – 4th place
- 1993 – 4th place
- 1996 – 4th place
- 2000 – (bronze)

=== African Olympic Qualifiers ===
- 2011 – 5th place
- 2015 – 6th place
- 2019 – 4th place
- 2023 – 8th place

=== Central-South Africa Qualifier for the Africa Cup of Nations ===
- 2025 – (bronze)

== Current squad ==
Head Coach: A Five

| No. | Name | Caps | Goals | Role |
|---|---|---|---|---|
| 1 | Isheanesu Marima (GK) | 4 | 0 | Goal-Keeper |
| 2 | Takunda Chipumha | 3 | 0 | Defender |
| 3 | Gift Chomunorwa | 3 | 0 | Defender |
| 4 | Tendayi Maredza (c) | 23 | 13 | Forward |
| 5 | Edwin Tholanah | 4 | 2 | Forward |
| 6 | Kanyiwe Tafuma | 4 | 1 | Forward |
| 7 | Tapiwa Mushayakarara | 4 | 0 | Mid fielder |
| 8 | Pritchard Matambo | 39 | 5 | Defender |
| 9 | Luckson Sikisa | 4 | 1 | Mid fielder |
| 10 | Kudzanai Tembo | 4 | 2 | Mid fielder |
| 11 | Constantine Muchono | 4 | 0 | Defender |
| 12 | Kudzai Chimbetete (GK) | 1 | 0 | Goal-Keeper |
| 13 | Forbes Thindwa | 4 | 2 | Mid fielder |
| 14 | Tatenda Kanyangarara | 3 | 3 | Forward |

== Notable former players ==
- Dave Houghton
- Lloyd Koch
- John McPhun
- Robert Ullyett
- Collin Williams
- Michael McKillop
- Matthew Williams
- Louis Mnyama
- Donald Mutupo

== See also ==
- Zimbabwe women's national field hockey team
- Rhodesian field hockey players
