= Kenya national field hockey team =

Kenya national field hockey team may refer to:

- Kenya men's national field hockey team
- Kenya women's national field hockey team
