= 2019 Men's African Olympic Qualifier =

African Hockey Road to Tokyo 2020

Tournament details
- Host country: South Africa
- City: Stellenbosch
- Dates: 12–18 August
- Teams: 6 (from 1 confederation)
- Venue: Stellenbosch University

Final positions
- Champions: South Africa (4th title)
- Runner-up: Egypt
- Third place: Ghana

Tournament statistics
- Matches played: 15
- Goals scored: 87 (5.8 per match)
- Top scorer: (South Africa) Austin Smith (10 goals)

The 2019 Men's African Olympic Qualifier was the fourth edition of the African qualification tournament for the men's field hockey event at the Summer Olympics. It was held alongside the women's tournament in Stellenbosch, South Africa from 12 to 18 August 2019.

The winner of the tournament qualified for the 2020 Summer Olympics.

South Africa won the tournament for the fourth time.

== Teams ==
The following eight teams, shown with pre-tournament FIH World Rankings, were expected to participate in the tournament. Nigeria and Uganda withdrew before the tournament.

- Egypt (20)
- Ghana (36)
- Kenya (48)
- Namibia (68)
- ~~Nigeria~~ (57)
- South Africa (14)
- ~~Uganda~~ (–)
- Zimbabwe (61)

== Results ==
All times are local (UTC+2).

=== Pool ===
Pos	Team	Pld	W	D	L	GF	GA	GD	Pts	Qualification
1	South Africa (H)	5	5	0	0	28	4	+24	15	2020 Summer Olympics
2	Egypt	5	4	0	1	24	7	+17	12	
3	Ghana	5	3	0	2	12	18	−6	9	
4	Zimbabwe	5	1	1	3	8	23	−15	4	
5	Kenya	5	1	0	4	9	18	−9	3	
6	Namibia	5	0	1	4	6	17	−11	1	

Source: FIH
Rules for classification: 1) points; 2) matches won; 3) goal difference; 4) goals for; 5) head-to-head result; 6) field goals scored.
(H) Hosts

=== Fixtures ===
12 August 2019
13:00

Egypt	6–0	Zimbabwe
El-Ganaini 4', 5', 34'; A. Sayed 52', 58'; Ibrahim 54'	Report

Umpires:
Ilanggo Kanabathu (MAS)
Sedtric Makati (NAM)

12 August 2019
15:00

Ghana	3–2	Kenya
Kwofie 37'; El. Akaba 52'; Nsalbini 60+'	Report	Wakhura 28'; Onyango 51'

Umpires:
Raghu Prasad (IND)
Scott Tarr (RSA)

12 August 2019
17:00

South Africa	3–1	Namibia
Cassiem 41'; Smith 55', 57'	Report	Barthram 60'

Umpires:
Peter Kabaso (KEN)
Ahmed El-Sayed (EGY)

13 August 2019
13:00

Egypt	7–2	Kenya
Adel 3', 7'; El-Ganaini 6', 45'; Ibrahim 24'; Ghobran 34'; Gamal 37'	Report	Wakhura 33'; Onyango 40'

Umpires:
Raghu Prasad (IND)
Sedtric Makati (NAM)

13 August 2019
15:00

Namibia	1–3	Ghana
Jacobs 30+'	Report	Nsalbini 25', 50', 53'

Umpires:
Munashe Mashoko (ZIM)
Peter Kabaso (KEN)

13 August 2019
19:00

South Africa	9–0	Zimbabwe
Paton 15'; Kok 21'; Cassiem 25'; Ntuli 26'; Panther 28'; Horne 36'; Smith 38', 40'; Drummond 42'	Report

Umpires:
Alfred Akrong (GHA)
Ilanggo Kanabathu (MAS)

15 August 2019
11:00

Kenya	2–3	Zimbabwe
Onyango 20'; Marango 43'	Report	Kanyangarara 36'; Maredza 50', 56'

Umpires:
Ahmed El-Sayed (EGY)
Alfred Akrong (GHA)

15 August 2019
13:00

Namibia	1–6	Egypt
Finch 41'	Report	Ghobran 3'; Adel 7'; El-Hady 27'; Ibrahim 34'; El-Naggar 50', 60'

Umpires:
Scott Tarr (RSA)
Munashe Mashoko (ZIM)

15 August 2019
17:00

Ghana	1–9	South Africa
Opoku 59'	Report	Smith 4', 6', 40', 50'; Eustice 11', 49'; Kok 21', 30'; Ntuli 35'

Umpires:
Raghu Prasad (IND)
Ilanggo Kanabathu (MAS)

17 August 2019
11:00

Zimbabwe	2–2	Namibia
O'Riordan 18'; Chomunorwa 43'	Report	Cleak 41'; Van der Merwe 54'

Umpires:
Peter Kabaso (KEN)
Alfred Akrong (GHA)

17 August 2019
13:00

Ghana	1–3	Egypt
Opoku 11'	Report	Ghobran 14'; Ragab 44'; Ibrahim 58'

Umpires:
Ilanggo Kanabathu (MAS)
Scott Tarr (RSA)

17 August 2019
17:00

South Africa	4–0	Kenya
Smith 30', 33'; Cassiem 37'; Horne 45'	Report

Umpires:
Sedtric Makati (NAM)
Munashe Mashoko (ZIM)

18 August 2019
11:00

Zimbabwe	3–4	Ghana
Mungwiniri 8'; Chomunorwa 50'; Maredza 59'	Report	Baiden 2'; Botsio 34'; Akaba 47', 50'

Umpires:
Ahmed El-Sayed (EGY)
Sedtric Makati (NAM)

18 August 2019
13:00

Kenya	3–1	Namibia
Okeyo 26'; Wakhura 57'; Onyango 57'	Report	Neethling 58'

Umpires:
Scott Tarr (RSA)
Munashe Mashoko (ZIM)

18 August 2019
17:00

Egypt	2–3	South Africa
El-Ganaini 30'; Said 60'	Report	Spooner 47', 48', 50'

Umpires:
Raghu Prasad (IND)
Ilanggo Kanabathu (MAS)

== Goalscorers ==
There were 87 goals scored in 15 matches, for an average of 5.8 goals per match.

10 goals

- (South Africa) Austin Smith

6 goals

- (Egypt) Ahmed El-Ganaini

4 goals

- (Egypt) Amr Ibrahim
- (Ghana) Salya Nsalbini
- (Kenya) Festus Onyango

3 goals

- (Egypt) Mohamed Adel
- (Egypt) Hossam Ghobran
- (Ghana) Elikem Akaba
- (Kenya) Constant Wakhura
- (South Africa) Dayaan Cassiem
- (South Africa) Tevin Kok
- (South Africa) Nicholas Spooner
- (Zimbabwe) Tendayi Maredza

2 goals

- (Egypt) Ahmed El-Naggar
- (Egypt) Amr Sayed
- (Ghana) Ernest Opoku
- (South Africa) Jethro Eustice
- (South Africa) Keenan Horne
- (South Africa) Nqobile Ntuli
- (Zimbabwe) Gift Chomunorwa

1 goal

- (Egypt) Amr El-Hady
- (Egypt) Ahmed Gamal
- (Egypt) Mohamed Ragab
- (Egypt) Ashraf Said
- (Ghana) Michael Baiden
- (Ghana) Johnny Botsio
- (Ghana) Benjamin Kwofie
- (Kenya) Arnold Marango
- (Kenya) Willis Okeyo
- (Namibia) Percy Barthram
- (Namibia) Brynn Cleak
- (Namibia) Dylan Finch
- (Namibia) Pieter Jacobs
- (Namibia) Cody van der Merwe
- (Namibia) Nico Neethling
- (South Africa) Timothy Drummond
- (South Africa) Clinton Panther
- (South Africa) Taine Paton
- (Zimbabwe) Tatenda Kanyangarara
- (Zimbabwe) Rangarirai Mungwiniri
- (Zimbabwe) Tony O'Riordan

Source: FIH

== See also ==
- 2019 Women's African Olympic Qualifier
