= 2017 Men's Hockey Africa Cup of Nations =

Tournament details
- Host country: Egypt
- City: Ismailia
- Dates: 22–29 October
- Teams: 5 (from 1 confederation)
- Venue: Suez Canal Authority Hockey Stadium

Final positions
- Champions: South Africa (7th title)
- Runner-up: Egypt
- Third place: Ghana

Tournament statistics
- Matches played: 12
- Goals scored: 73 (6.08 per match)
- Top scorer: (Egypt) Ahmed El-Ganaini (6 goals)

The 2017 Men's Hockey Africa Cup of Nations was the tenth edition of the Men's Hockey Africa Cup of Nations, the quadrennial international men's field hockey championship of Africa organised by the African Hockey Federation. It was held in Ismailia, Egypt from 22 to 29 October 2017.

Zambia withdrew before the tournament. The winner qualified for the 2018 Men's Hockey World Cup.

The six-time defending champions South Africa won their seventh title.

== Venue ==
The location of the Africa Cup of Nations venue was the Suez Canal Authority Hockey Stadium in Ismailia.

Location of the Africa Cup of Nations venue

=== Teams ===
- Egypt (hosts)
- Ghana
- Kenya
- Nigeria
- South Africa
- Zambia (withdrew)

== Results ==
All times are local (UTC+2).

=== Preliminary round ===
| Pos | Team | Pld | W | D | L | GF | GA | GD | Pts | Qualification |
|---|---|---|---|---|---|---|---|---|---|---|
| 1 | Egypt (H) | 4 | 3 | 1 | 0 | 24 | 5 | +19 | 10 | Final |
| 2 | South Africa | 4 | 3 | 1 | 0 | 20 | 7 | +13 | 10 | Final |
| 3 | Ghana | 4 | 2 | 0 | 2 | 10 | 8 | +2 | 6 | Third place game |
| 4 | Kenya | 4 | 1 | 0 | 3 | 4 | 14 | −10 | 3 | Third place game |
| 5 | Nigeria | 4 | 0 | 0 | 4 | 4 | 28 | −24 | 0 | |

Source: FIH
Rules for classification: 1) points; 2) goal difference; 3) goals scored; 4) head-to-head result.
(H) Hosts

22 October 2017
12:00

| Ghana | 3–0 | Kenya |
|---|---|---|
| Damalie 4'; Akaba 33'; Akuamoah-Boateng 45' | Report |

Suez Canal Authority Hockey Stadium
Umpires:
Javed Shaikh (IND)
Ahmed El-Sayed (EGY)

22 October 2017
15:00

| Egypt | 13–1 | Nigeria |
|---|---|---|
| El-Ganaini 1', 10', 27'; Ibrahim 5', 9'; Mohsen 15'; Ghobran 30', 32', 43'; El-Naggar 32', 60'; El-Hady 35'; Zaki 40' | Report | Bello 41' |

Suez Canal Authority Hockey Stadium
Umpires:
Michiel Otten (NED)
Aziz Adimah (GHA)

23 October 2017
13:00

| South Africa | 8–1 | Nigeria |
|---|---|---|
| Horne 1', 35', 60'; Bell 21'; Rosenberg 21'; Hykes 42'; Eustice 45'; Robinson 54' | Report | Mamman 50' |

Suez Canal Authority Hockey Stadium
Umpires:
Peter Kabaso (KEN)
Ahmed El-Sayed (EGY)

23 October 2017
15:00

| Egypt | 4–1 | Kenya |
|---|---|---|
| El-Naggar 2'; El-Hady 4'; Ghobran 50'; Gamal 54' | Report | Mutira 52' |

Suez Canal Authority Hockey Stadium
Umpires:
Jibrin Kolo (NGA)
Darren Hubach (RSA)

25 October 2017
13:00

| Kenya | 2–1 | Nigeria |
|---|---|---|
| Onyango 43'; Wakhura 56' | Report | John 39' |

Suez Canal Authority Hockey Stadium
Umpires:
Aziz Adimah (GHA)
Darren Hubach (RSA)

25 October 2017
17:00

| South Africa | 3–2 | Ghana |
|---|---|---|
| Ntuli 8'; Paton 9', 46' | Report | Baiden 1'; Opoku 44' |

Suez Canal Authority Hockey Stadium
Umpires:
Peter Kabaso (KEN)
Jibrin Kolo (NGA)

26 October 2017
15:00

| Egypt | 3–3 | South Africa |
|---|---|---|
| Husseinen 30+'; Gamal 35'; El-Ganaini 41' | Report | Paton 23'; Ntuli 28'; Horne 48' |

Suez Canal Authority Hockey Stadium
Umpires:
Javed Shaikh (IND)
Michiel Otten (NED)

26 October 2017
17:00

| Nigeria | 1–5 | Ghana |
|---|---|---|
| Fowobaje 10' | Report | Damalie 21'; Ankomah 27'; Abbiw 45'; Ntiamoah 46'; Opoku 49' |

Suez Canal Authority Hockey Stadium
Umpires:
Darren Hubach (RSA)
Peter Kabaso (KEN)

28 October 2017
11:00

| South Africa | 6–1 | Kenya |
|---|---|---|
| Eustice 18'; Rosenberg 19'; Horne 34', 48'; Bell 37'; Robinson 46' | Report | Wakhura 19' |

Suez Canal Authority Hockey Stadium
Umpires:
Aziz Adimah (GHA)
Ahmed El-Sayed (EGY)

28 October 2017
15:00

| Ghana | 0–4 | Egypt |
|---|---|---|
| | Report | Atef 33', 38'; Zaki 46'; El-Ganaini 51' |

Suez Canal Authority Hockey Stadium
Umpires:
Peter Kabaso (KEN)
Jibrin Kolo (NGA)

=== Classification round ===
==== Third and fourth place ====
29 October 2017
12:30

| Ghana | 5–3 | Kenya |
|---|---|---|
| Tettey 20'; Akaba 20', 30'; Damalie 23'; Ankomah 42' | Report | Wakhura 17'; Onyango 52'; Munialo 56' |

Suez Canal Authority Hockey Stadium
Umpires:
Ahmed El-Sayed (EGY)
Darren Hubach (RSA)

==== Final ====
29 October 2017
15:00

| Egypt | 1–2 | South Africa |
|---|---|---|
| El-Ganaini 8' | Report | Paton 39'; Eustice 58' |

Suez Canal Authority Hockey Stadium
Umpires:
Javed Shaikh (IND)
Michiel Otten (NED)

== Final standings ==
| Pos | Team | Qualification |
|---|---|---|
| 1 | South Africa | 2018 World Cup |
| 2 | Egypt (H) | |
| 3 | Ghana | |
| 4 | Kenya | |
| 5 | Nigeria | |

Source: FIH
(H) Host

== Goalscorers ==
There were 73 goals scored in 12 matches, for an average of 6.08 goals per match.

6 goals

- (Egypt) Ahmed El-Ganaini

5 goals

- (South Africa) Keenan Horne

4 goals

- (Egypt) Houssam Ghobran

3 goals

- (Egypt) Ahmed El-Naggar
- (Ghana) Elikem Akaba
- (Ghana) Luke Damalie
- (Kenya) Constant Wakhura
- (South Africa) Jethro Eustice
- (South Africa) Nqobile Ntuli
- (South Africa) Taine Paton

2 goals

- (Egypt) Hamada Atef
- (Egypt) Amr El-Hady
- (Egypt) Ahmed Gamal
- (Egypt) Amr Ibrahim
- (Egypt) Mohamed Zaki
- (Ghana) Emmanuel Ankomah
- (Ghana) Ernest Opoku
- (Kenya) Festus Onyango
- (South Africa) Daniel Bell
- (South Africa) Jonathan Robinson
- (South Africa) Reza Rosenberg

1 goal

- (Egypt) Mohamed Husseinen
- (Egypt) Ahmed Mohsen
- (Ghana) Charles Abbiw
- (Ghana) Michael Akuamoah-Boateng
- (Ghana) Michael Baiden
- (Ghana) Alfred Ntiamoah
- (Ghana) Francis Tettey
- (Kenya) Kennedy Mango
- (Kenya) George Mutria
- (Nigeria) Muiz Bello
- (Nigeria) Oluwatosin Fowobaje
- (Nigeria) Michael John
- (Nigeria) Mamman Mamman Kolo
- (South Africa) Tim Drummond
- (South Africa) Julian Hykes

Source: FIH

== See also ==
- 2017 Women's Hockey Africa Cup of Nations
