= 2007 African Olympic Field Hockey Qualifier =

2007 African Olympic Qualifier
Tournament details
- Host country: Kenya
- City: Nairobi
- Dates: 14–22 July
- Venue: City Park Hockey Stadium

The 2007 African Olympic Qualifier was the first edition of the African field hockey qualification tournament for the Summer Olympics for men and women. It was held from 14 to 22 July 2007 in Nairobi, Kenya. The winners of each tournament qualified for the 2008 Summer Olympics.

2007 All-Africa Games were supposed to be the African qualifier for 2008 Olympics, but as the host country Algeria lacks suitable venues, field hockey was not part of the games, forcing the African Hockey Federation to hold a separate tournament.

== Men's tournament ==
2007 Men's African Olympic Qualifier
Tournament details
- Host country: Kenya
- City: Nairobi
- Dates: 14–22 July
- Teams: 6 (from 1 confederation)
- Venue: City Park Hockey Stadium

Final positions
- Champions: South Africa (1st title)
- Runner-up: Egypt
- Third place: Kenya

Tournament statistics
- Matches played: 18
- Goals scored: 102 (5.67 per match)

=== Pool ===
Pos	Team	Pld	W	D	L	GF	GA	GD	Pts	Qualification
1	South Africa	5	4	0	1	31	3	+28	12	Final
2	Egypt	5	3	2	0	25	1	+24	11	Final
3	Kenya (H)	5	3	1	1	8	2	+6	10	Third place game
4	Ghana	5	2	1	2	14	7	+7	7	Third place game
5	Nigeria	5	1	0	4	8	13	−5	3	Fifth place game
6	Uganda	5	0	0	5	0	60	−60	0	Fifth place game

Source: Todor66
(H) Hosts

All times are local, EAT (UTC+3)

14 July 2007
14:30

Ghana	1–4	South Africa

14 July 2007
16:30

Kenya	1–0	Nigeria

15 July 2007
14:30

Uganda	0–18	Egypt

15 July 2007
16:30

Nigeria	0–2	Ghana

16 July 2007
12:30

South Africa	20–0	Uganda

16 July 2007
14:30

Egypt	5–0	Nigeria

16 July 2007
16:30

Ghana	0–2	Kenya

18 July 2007
14:30

Egypt	1–0	South Africa

18 July 2007
16:30

Kenya	5–0	Uganda

19 July 2007
12:30

South Africa	5–1	Nigeria

19 July 2007
14:30

Egypt	0–0	Kenya

19 July 2007
16:30

Uganda	0–10	Ghana

20 July 2007
12:30

South Africa	2–0	Kenya

20 July 2007
14:30

Nigeria	7–0	Uganda

20 July 2007
16:30

Egypt	1–1	Ghana

=== Classification round ===
==== Fifth and sixth place ====
21 July 2007
15:30

Nigeria	7–1	Uganda

==== Third and fourth place ====
22 July 2007
10:30

Kenya	3–2	Ghana

==== Final ====
22 July 2007
15:30

South Africa	2–1	Egypt
E. Smith 39'; Abbott 64'	Report	S. Mohamed 10'

Umpires:
Philip Schellekens (NED)
Satinder Kumar (IND)

=== Final standings ===
Rank	Team
1st place, gold medalist(s)	South Africa
2nd place, silver medalist(s)	Egypt
3rd place, bronze medalist(s)	Kenya
4	Ghana
5	Nigeria
6	Uganda

Qualified for the 2008 Summer Olympics

Qualified for the Olympic qualification tournaments

== Women's tournament ==
2007 Women's African Olympic Qualifier
Tournament details
- Host country: Kenya
- City: Nairobi
- Dates: 14–22 July
- Teams: 6 (from 1 confederation)
- Venue: City Park Hockey Stadium

Final positions
- Champions: South Africa (1st title)
- Runner-up: Kenya
- Third place: Ghana

Tournament statistics
- Matches played: 18
- Goals scored: 71 (3.94 per match)
- Top scorer: (South Africa) Kate Hector (8 goals)

=== Pool ===
Pos	Team	Pld	W	D	L	GF	GA	GD	Pts	Qualification
1	South Africa	5	5	0	0	40	0	+40	15	Final
2	Kenya (H)	5	4	0	1	5	9	−4	12	Final
3	Ghana	5	2	1	2	7	12	−5	7	Third place game
4	Nigeria	5	2	1	2	7	14	−7	7	Third place game
5	Namibia	5	1	0	4	2	12	−10	3	Fifth place game
6	Zimbabwe	5	0	0	5	2	16	−14	0	Fifth place game

Source: Todor66
(H) Hosts

All times are local, EAT (UTC+3)

14 July 2007
08:30

South Africa	7–0	Namibia

14 July 2007
10:30

Ghana	3–3	Nigeria

14 July 2007
12:30

Zimbabwe	0–1	Kenya

15 July 2007
08:30

Nigeria	0–8	South Africa

15 July 2007
10:30

Namibia	2–0	Zimbabwe

15 July 2007
12:30

Kenya	1–0	Ghana

17 July 2007
08:30

Ghana	2–0	Namibia

17 July 2007
10:30

Kenya	2–0	Nigeria

17 July 2007
12:30

South Africa	9–0	Zimbabwe

18 July 2007
10:30

Nigeria	2–1	Zimbabwe

18 July 2007
12:30

South Africa	7–0	Ghana

19 July 2007
08:30

Namibia	0–1	Kenya

2–1 July 2007
10:30

Zimbabwe	1–2	Ghana

20 July 2007
08:30

Nigeria	2–0	Namibia

20 July 2007
10:30

Kenya	0–9	South Africa

=== Classification round ===
==== Fifth and sixth place ====
21 July 2007
13:00

Namibia	0–0 (a.e.t.)	Zimbabwe
Penalties
	2–4

==== Third and fourth place ====
22 July 2007
08:00

Ghana	2–1	Nigeria

==== Final ====
22 July 2007
13:00

South Africa	5–0	Kenya
Hector 6'; Wilson 15'; Russell 19'; Du Buisson 34'; Bailey 43'	Report

Umpires:
Ru Xiong (CHN)
Sarah Bennett (ZIM)

=== Final standings ===
Rank	Team
1st place, gold medalist(s)	South Africa
2nd place, silver medalist(s)	Kenya
3rd place, bronze medalist(s)	Ghana
4	Nigeria
5	Zimbabwe
6	Namibia

Qualified for the 2008 Summer Olympics

Qualified for the Olympic qualification tournaments
