= Zimbabwe women's national field hockey team =

Zimbabwe
- Association: Hockey Association of Zimbabwe
- Confederation: AfHF (Africa)
- Head Coach: Patricia Davies
Home	Away

FIH ranking
- Current: 61 (25 July 2026)

Olympic Games
- Appearances: 1 (first in 1980)
- Best result: (gold) 1st (1980)

Africa Cup of Nations
- Appearances: 3 (first in 1990)
- Best result: (gold) 1st (1990)

African Games
- Appearances: 3 (first in 1995)
- Best result: (silver) 2nd (1995, 1999)
Medal record
Event	1st	2nd	3rd
Olympic Games	1	0	0
Africa Cup of Nations	1	1	1
African Games	0	2	0
Total	2	3	1
Olympic Games
Gold medal – first place	1980 Moscow	Team
Africa Cup of Nations
Gold medal – first place	1990 Harare	
Silver medal – second place	1994 Pretoria	
Bronze medal – third place	1998 Harare	
African Games
Silver medal – second place	1995 Harare	Team
Silver medal – second place	1999 Johannesburg	Team

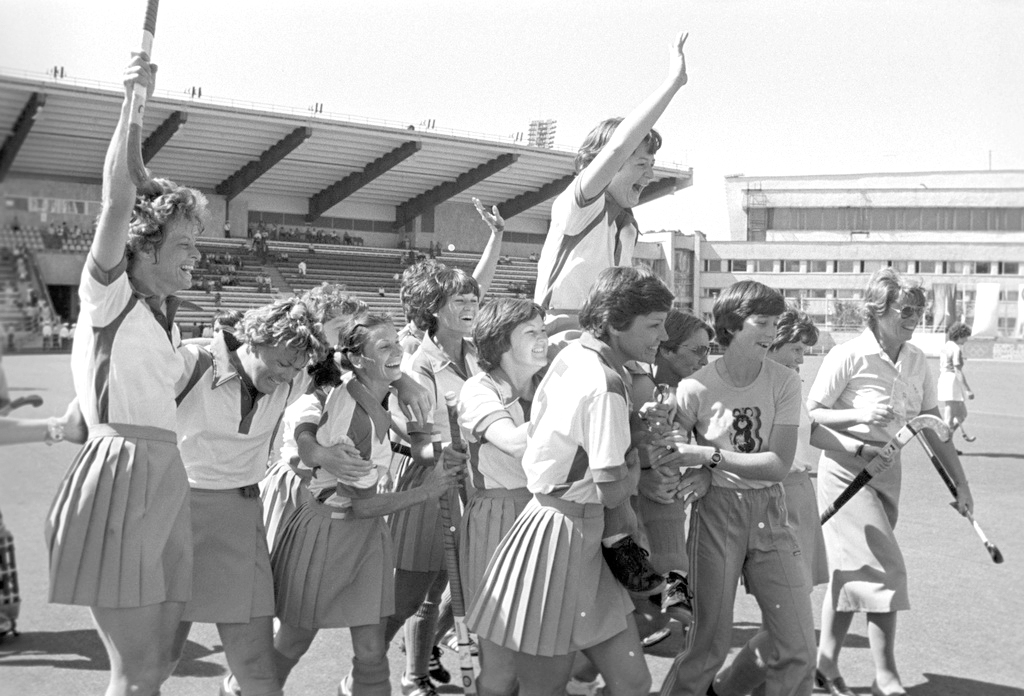
The Zimbabwean women's field hockey team that won gold at the 1980 Olympics

The Zimbabwe women's national field hockey team is the national women's team representing Zimbabwe in field hockey.

It won the gold medal at the 1980 Summer Olympics in Moscow, USSR, the first female Olympic tournament. Zimbabwe also won the inaugural Hockey African Cup for Nations they hosted in 1990, followed by a silver medal in 1994 and a bronze in 1998.

== Tournament record ==
=== Summer Olympics ===
- 1980 – (gold)

=== Africa Cup of Nations ===
- 1990 – (gold)
- 1994 – (silver)
- 1998 – (bronze)
- 2022 – 4th
- 2025 – WD

=== African Games ===
- 1995 – (silver)
- 1999 – (silver)
- 2003 – 5th

=== African Olympic Qualifier ===
- 2007 – 5th
- 2011 – 4th
- 2015 – 5th
- 2019 – (bronze)
- 2023 – 7th

=== FIH Hockey Series ===
- 2018–19 – First round

=== Central-South Africa Qualifier for the Africa Cup of Nations ===
- 2025 – (silver)

== See also ==
- Zimbabwe men's national field hockey team
