= 2009 Men's Hockey Africa Cup of Nations =

Tournament details
- Host country: Ghana
- City: Accra
- Dates: 10–16 July
- Teams: 4 (from 1 confederation)

Final positions
- Champions: South Africa (5th title)
- Runner-up: Egypt
- Third place: Ghana

Tournament statistics
- Matches played: 8
- Goals scored: 34 (4.25 per match)

The 2009 Men's Hockey Africa Cup of Nations was the eighth edition of the Men's Hockey Africa Cup of Nations, the quadrennial international men's field hockey championship of Africa organised by the African Hockey Federation. It was held alongside the women's tournament in Accra, Ghana from 10 to 16 July 2009.

The four-time defending champions South Africa won their fifth title and qualified for the 2010 Men's Hockey World Cup by defeating Egypt 4–1 in the final. The hosts Ghana won the bronze medal by defeating Nigeria 3–2 after extra time.

== Results ==
=== Preliminary round ===
Pos	Team	Pld	W	D	L	GF	GA	GD	Pts	Qualification
1	South Africa	3	3	0	0	18	0	+18	9	Final
2	Egypt	3	1	1	1	3	4	−1	4	Final
3	Nigeria	3	1	0	2	3	11	−8	3	Third place game
4	Ghana (H)	3	0	1	2	2	11	−9	1	Third place game

Source: Todor66
(H) Hosts

10 July 2009

Egypt	2–1	Nigeria

10 July 2009

South Africa	8–0	Ghana

12 July 2009

South Africa	2–0	Egypt

12 July 2009

Nigeria	2–1	Ghana

14 July 2009

South Africa	8–0	Nigeria

14 July 2009

Egypt	1–1	Ghana

=== Third place game ===
15 July 2009

Ghana	3–2 (a.e.t.)	Nigeria

=== Final ===
16 July 2009

South Africa	3–1	Egypt

== Final standings ==
Pos	Team	Qualification
1	South Africa	2010 World Cup
2	Egypt	
3	Ghana (H)	
4	Nigeria	

Source: Todor66
(H) Host

== See also ==
- 2009 Women's Hockey Africa Cup of Nations
