= 2019 Women's African Olympic Qualifier =

Field hockey tournament

African Hockey Road to Tokyo 2020

Tournament details
- Host country: South Africa
- City: Stellenbosch
- Dates: 12–18 August
- Teams: 5 (from 1 confederation)
- Venue: Stellenbosch University

Final positions
- Champions: South Africa (4th title)
- Runner-up: Ghana
- Third place: Zimbabwe

Tournament statistics
- Matches played: 10
- Goals scored: 33 (3.3 per match)
- Top scorer: (South Africa) Lilian du Plessis (4 goals)
- Best player: (South Africa) Ongeziwe Mali
- Best goalkeeper: (Zimbabwe) Jordyn Clipstone (Kenya) Cynthia Onyango

The 2019 Women's African Olympic Qualifier was the fourth edition of the African qualification tournament for the women's field hockey event at the Summer Olympics. It was held alongside the men's tournament in Stellenbosch, South Africa from 12 to 18 August 2019.

The winner of the tournament qualified for the 2020 Summer Olympics.

South Africa won the tournament for the fourth time.

== Teams ==
The following seven teams, shown with pre-tournament FIH World Rankings, were expected to participate in the tournament. Nigeria and Uganda withdrew before the tournament.

- Ghana (32)
- Kenya (45)
- Namibia (40)
- ~~Nigeria~~ (47)
- South Africa (16)
- ~~Uganda~~ (–)
- Zimbabwe (66)

== Results ==
All times are local (UTC+2).

=== Pool ===
Pos	Team	Pld	W	D	L	GF	GA	GD	Pts	Qualification
1	South Africa (H)	4	4	0	0	16	0	+16	12	2020 Summer Olympics
2	Ghana	4	2	1	1	7	8	−1	7	
3	Zimbabwe	4	2	0	2	6	7	−1	6	
4	Kenya	4	1	1	2	2	6	−4	4	
5	Namibia	4	0	0	4	2	12	−10	0	

Source: FIH
Rules for classification: 1) points; 2) matches won; 3) goal difference; 4) goals for; 5) head-to-head result; 6) field goals scored.
(H) Hosts

=== Fixtures ===
12 August 2019
09:00

Ghana	3–1	Zimbabwe
Narkuor 10', 13'; Sarfo 36'	Report	McDonald 21'

Umpires:
Tang Shi Him (HKG)
Liana du Plessis (NAM)

12 August 2019
11:00

Namibia	0–1	Kenya
	Report	Makokha 44'

Umpires:
Melissa Taylor (RSA)
Cynthia Clement (GHA)

13 August 2019
11:00

Ghana	1–1	Kenya
Berko 21'	Report	Kuira 7'

Umpires:
Chieko Soma (JPN)
Sharne Mayers (ZIM)

13 August 2019
17:00

South Africa	2–0	Zimbabwe
Mali 14'; Chamberlain 57'	Report

Umpires:
Deborah Agunda (KEN)
Cynthia Clement (GHA)

15 August 2019
09:00

Kenya	0–2	Zimbabwe
	Report	Muragu 44'; Omwandho 51'

Umpires:
Melissa Taylor (RSA)
Liana du Plessis (NAM)

15 August 2019
15:00

Namibia	0–5	South Africa
	Report	Zulu 14'; Glasby 39'; Veto 49'; Du Plessis 52'; Mali 55'

Umpires:
Sharne Mayers (ZIM)
Tang Shi Him (HKG)

17 August 2019
09:00

Namibia	0–3	Ghana
	Report	Opoku 15'; Whyte 20'; Coffie 38'

Umpires:
Chieko Soma (JPN)
Deborah Agunda (KEN)

17 August 2019
15:00

South Africa	3–0	Kenya
Hunter 3'; Glasby 25'; Mali 28'	Report

Umpires:
Sharne Mayers (ZIM)
Liana du Plessis (NAM)

18 August 2019
09:00

Zimbabwe	3–2	Namibia
McDonald 3'; Watson 14', 38'	Report	Myburgh 45'; Gerber 53'

Umpires:
Melissa Taylor (RSA)
Cynthia Clement (GHA)

18 August 2019
15:00

Ghana	0–6	South Africa
	Report	Du Plessis 6', 14', 39'; Johnson 7'; Van Jaarsveldt 36'; Deetlefs 42'

Umpires:
Chieko Soma (JPN)
Tang Shi Him (HKG)

== Goalscorers ==
There were 33 goals scored in 10 matches, for an average of 3.3 goals per match.

4 goals

- (South Africa) Lilian du Plessis

3 goals

- (South Africa) Ongeziwe Mali

2 goals

- (Ghana) Vivian Narkour
- (South Africa) Tarryn Glasby
- (Zimbabwe) Sophie McDonald
- (Zimbabwe) Nicola Watson

1 goal

- (Ghana) Mavis Berko
- (Ghana) Ernestina Coffie
- (Ghana) Elizabeth Opoku
- (Ghana) Roberta Sarfo
- (Ghana) Debora Whyte
- (Kenya) Rhoda Kuira
- (Kenya) Grace Makokha
- (Namibia) Phea Gerber
- (Namibia) Taramarie Myburgh
- (South Africa) Dirkie Chamberlain
- (South Africa) Lisa-Marie Deetlefs
- (South Africa) Erin Hunter
- (South Africa) Sylvia van Jaarsveldt
- (South Africa) Robyn Johnson
- (South Africa) Nomnikelo Veto
- (South Africa) Onthatile Zulu
- (Zimbabwe) Jane Muragu
- (Zimbabwe) Leah Omwandho

Source: FIH

== See also ==
- 2019 Men's African Olympic Qualifier
