= Ghana men's national field hockey team =

Field hockey team

Ghana
- Association: Ghana Hockey Association
- Confederation: AfHF (Africa)
Home	Away

FIH ranking
- Current: 35 (2 August 2026)
- Highest: 25 (2003)
- Lowest: 43 (November 2015 – August 2016)

World Cup
- Appearances: 1 (first in 1975)
- Best result: 12th (1975)

Africa Cup of Nations
- Appearances: 9 (first in 1974)
- Best result: (gold) 1st (1974)

African Games
- Appearances: 5 (first in 1987)
- Best result: (silver) 2nd (2023)
Medal record
Event	1st	2nd	3rd
Africa Cup of Nations	1	0	4
African Games	0	1	1
Total	1	1	5
Africa Cup of Nations
Gold medal – first place	1974 Cairo	
Bronze medal – third place	1983 Cairo	
Bronze medal – third place	2005 Pretoria	
Bronze medal – third place	2009 Accra	
Bronze medal – third place	2017 Ismailia	
African Games
Silver medal – second place	2023 Accra	Team
Bronze medal – third place	2003 Abuja	Team

The Ghana men's national field hockey team represents Ghana in men's international field hockey competitions and is controlled by the Ghana Hockey Association, the governing body for field hockey in Ghana.

Ghana is ranked at 36 according to FIH Rankings (as of June 2019).

== Overview ==
Ghana participated in the Hockey World League for the first time in 2016–17. In Round 1, they played in the African group with Kenya, Namibia and Nigeria, winning all three pool matches including a 1–0 victory over the strong Kenyan team. In Round 2, they were placed in Pool B with Sri Lanka, Egypt and China. Ghana beat only Sri Lanka, and in the quarterfinal clash, Oman stunned Ghana 4–3. In the end, Ghana finished 6th in the rankings.

Trainings and matches in preparation for international tournaments are held at the Theodosia Okoh Hockey Stadium in Accra.

== Tournament record ==
=== World Cup ===
- 1975 – 12th place

=== Africa Cup of Nations ===
- 1974 – (gold)
- 1983 – (bronze)
- 2000 – 4th place
- 2005 – (bronze)
- 2009 – (bronze)
- 2013 – 4th place
- 2017 – (bronze)
- 2022 – 5th
- 2025 – 5th

=== African Games ===
- 1987 – 5th place
- 1991 – 4th place
- 1999 – 5th place
- 2003 – (bronze)
- 2023 – (silver)

=== African Olympic Qualifier ===
- 2007 – 4th place
- 2011 – (bronze)
- 2015 – 4th place
- 2019 – (bronze)
- 2023 – (bronze)

=== Commonwealth Games ===
- 2022 – 10th place

=== Hockey World League ===
- 2012–13 – Round 1
- 2014–15 – Round 1
- 2016–17 – 28th place

== See also ==
- Ghana women's national field hockey team
