= 2025 Men's Hockey Africa Cup of Nations =

Hockey Africa Cup

Tournament details
- Host country: Egypt
- City: Ismailia
- Dates: 11–18 October
- Teams: 6 (from 1 confederation)
- Venue: Suez Canal Authority Hockey Stadium

Final positions
- Champions: South Africa (9th title)
- Runner-up: Egypt
- Third place: Nigeria

Tournament statistics
- Matches played: 15
- Goals scored: 99 (6.6 per match)
- Top scorer: (Nigeria) James Samaila (8 goals)
- Best player: (Egypt) Ahmed El-Ganaini
- Best goalkeeper: (Kenya) Samuel Silong

The 2025 Men's Hockey Africa Cup of Nations was the 12th edition of the Men's Hockey Africa Cup of Nations, the quadrennial international men's field hockey championship of Africa organised by the African Hockey Federation. The tournament was held alongside the women's tournament in Ismailia, Egypt from 11 to 18 October 2025.

South Africa, as the winner, qualified for the 2026 Men's FIH Hockey World Cup.

== Qualification ==
The top two highest-ranked teams in the FIH World Rankings qualified directly for the tournament while the other teams had to play in the regional qualifiers. The top two teams from each of the regional qualifiers qualified for the tournament. The three regions were North-East Africa, North-West Africa, and Central-South Africa.

Highlighted are the countries that are participating in the 2025 Men's Hockey Africa Cup of Nations. Qualified Hosts

Dates	Event	Location	Quotas	Qualifiers
—N/a	FIH World Rankings	—N/a	2	South Africa; Egypt
15 – 23 June 2024	North-West Africa Qualifier	Cancelled	2	Ghana; Nigeria
22 – 2 April 2024	North-East Africa Qualifier	Cancelled	2	Kenya; ~~Uganda~~
17 – 21 August 2024	Central-South Africa Qualifier	Harare, Zimbabwe	2	~~Namibia~~; Zambia
Total			8	

== Preliminary round ==
All times are local (UTC+2).

=== Standings ===
Pos	Team	Pld	W	D	L	GF	GA	GD	Pts	Qualification
1	South Africa	5	4	1	0	30	10	+20	13	Final
2	Egypt (H)	5	4	1	0	26	11	+15	13	Final
3	Kenya	5	2	0	3	9	12	−3	6	Third place match
4	Nigeria	5	2	0	3	14	18	−4	6	Third place match
5	Ghana	5	2	0	3	16	22	−6	6	
6	Zambia	5	0	0	5	4	26	−22	0	

Source: FIH
Rules for classification: 1) points; 2) matches won; 3) goal difference; 4) goals for; 5) head-to-head result; 6) field goals for.
(H) Hosts

=== Matches ===
11 October 2025
10:00

Ghana	1–2	Nigeria
Teye 58'	Report	Solomon 36', 49'

Umpires:
Rawi Anbananthan (MAS)
Haitham Selim (EGY)

11 October 2025
14:00

South Africa	5–0 (Note: The match resulted in a walkover, after the Zambian team arrived late and did not made it in time for the game.)	Zambia
	Report

Umpires:
Titus Mulwa (KEN)
Simon Awasa (NGR)

11 October 2025
20:30

Egypt	2–1	Kenya
H. Ragab 43'; Mos. Ragab 51'	Report	Masambu 40'

Umpires:
Peter Caulder (RSA)
Aziz Adimah (GHA)

12 October 2025
13:00

Zambia	0–5	Ghana
	Report

Umpires:
Haitham Selim (EGY)
Peter Caulder (RSA)

12 October 2025
15:00

South Africa	3–1	Kenya
Horne 20'; M. Cassiem 24'; Davis 49'	Report	Masambu 40'

Umpires:
Aziz Adimah (GHA)
Simon Awasa (NGR)

12 October 2025
19:00

Egypt	6–3	Nigeria
Adel 4', 8'; H. Ragab 6'; Abdelmonem 11'; El-Ganaini 26'; Moh. Ragab 53'	Report	Victor 7'; Samaila 21', 26'

Umpires:
Rawi Anbananthan (MAS)
Titus Mulwa (KEN)

14 October 2025
11:00

Nigeria	5–1	Zambia
John 14'; Samaila 30', 44', 48'; Godwin 57'	Report	Tagwireyi 54'

Umpires:
Haitham Selim (EGY)
Titus Mulwa (KEN)

14 October 2025
15:00

Egypt	3–3	South Africa
Mos. Ragab 23'; Adel 32'; Mamdouh 45'	Report	Davis 10'; D. Cassiem 21', 53'

Umpires:
Rawi Anbananthan (MAS)
Simon Awasa (NGR)

14 October 2025
19:00

Kenya	2–4	Ghana
Omwaka 7'; Loise 60'	Report	Kwofie 5'; Apronti 5'; Quagraine 10'; Akaba 23'

Umpires:
Peter Caulder (RSA)
Abraham Chaya (ZAM)

15 October 2025
15:00

Nigeria	1–2	Kenya
John 4'	Report	Omwaka 15+'; Mosoiko 43'

Umpires:
Aziz Adimah (GHA)
Abraham Chaya (ZAM)

15 October 2025
17:00

Zambia	1–8	Egypt
Mutale 42'	Report	Mamdouh 21', 29', 45'; Karem 30', 38'; Mos. Ragab 52'; Nasr 59'; Adel 59'

Umpires:
Peter Caulder (RSA)
Simon Awasa (NGR)

15 October 2025
19:00

Ghana	3–11	South Africa
Akaba 16'; Kwofie 30'; Dogbe 50'	Report	Horne 12', 57'; D. Cassiem 21', 38', 43'; Mvimbi 26'; Kraai 32'; Mann 35'; Davis 39'; Ngubane 46'; Neethling 59'

Umpires:
Haitham Selim (EGY)
Titus Mulwa (KEN)

17 October 2025
15:00

Kenya	3–2	Zambia
Ludiali 22'; Nayombe 23'; Omari 46'	Report	Tagwireyi 9'; Mpande 12'

Umpires:
Haitham Selim (EGY)
Simon Awasa (NGR)

17 October 2025
17:00

Egypt	7–3	Ghana
Adel 17'; El-Ganaini 18', 28', 41'; H. Ragab 28'; Said 43'; Abdelmonem 53'	Report	Folivi 35'; Quagraine 36'; Quaye 54'

Umpires:
Rawi Anbananthan (MAS)
Peter Caulder (RSA)

17 October 2025
19:00

South Africa	8–3	Nigeria
D. Cassiem 4', 33'; Hobson 29'; Horne 31'; Neethling 37', 47'; Mvimbi 44'; Spooner 44'	Report	Solomon 16'; Ibrahim 30'; Samaila 45'

Umpires:
Aziz Adimah (GHA)
Titus Mulwa (KEN)

== First to fourth place classification ==
=== Third and fourth place ===
18 October 2025
13:15

Kenya	1–3	Nigeria
Usagi 25'	Report	Solomon 17'; Samaila 46', 50'

Umpires:
Peter Caulder (RSA)
Haitham Selim (EGY)

=== Final ===
18 October 2025
17:45

South Africa	5–1	Egypt
M. Cassiem 8', 15', 43'; Spooner 41'; Davis 46'	Report	Esmat 19'

Umpires:
Rawi Anbananthan (MAS)
Aziz Adimah (GHA)

== Statistics and awards ==
=== Final standings ===
Pos	Team	Qualification
1st place, gold medalist(s)	South Africa	2026 FIH Hockey World Cup
2nd place, silver medalist(s)	Egypt (H)	2026 World Cup Qualifiers
3rd place, bronze medalist(s)	Nigeria	
4	Kenya	
5	Ghana	
6	Zambia	

Source: FIH
(H) Host

=== Goalscorers ===
There were 99 goals scored in 15 matches, for an average of 6.6 goals per match.

8 goals

- (Nigeria) James Samaila

7 goals

- (South Africa) Dayaan Cassiem

4 goals

- (Egypt) Ahmed El-Ganaini
- (Egypt) Mahmoud Mamdouh
- (Nigeria) Dennis Solomon
- (South Africa) Mustapha Cassiem
- (South Africa) Calvin Davis
- (South Africa) Keenan Horne

3 goals

- (Egypt) Ziad Adel
- (Egypt) Hossameldin Ragab
- (Egypt) Mostafa Ragab
- (Ghana) Kofi Quagraine
- (South Africa) Hans Neethling

2 goals

- (Egypt) Basel Abdelmonem
- (Egypt) Mohamed Adel
- (Egypt) Ahmed Karem
- (Ghana) Emmanuel Akaba
- (Ghana) Benjamin Kwofie
- (Kenya) Bethuel Masambu
- (Kenya) Mathias Omwaka
- (Nigeria) Peter John
- (South Africa) Samkelo Mvimbi
- (South Africa) Nicholas Spooner
- (Zambia) Abraham Tagwireyi

1 goal

- (Egypt) Zeiad Esmat
- (Egypt) Mohamed Nasr
- (Egypt) Mohamed Ragab
- (Egypt) Ashraf Said
- (Ghana) Sylvester Apronti
- (Ghana) Christopher Dogbe
- (Ghana) Francis Folivi
- (Ghana) Bernard Quaye
- (Kenya) Moses Loise
- (Kenya) Ivan Ludiali
- (Kenya) Alex Mosoiko
- (Kenya) Linton Nayombe
- (Kenya) Cliffe Omari
- (Kenya) Sutcliffe Usagi
- (Nigeria) Sunday Godwin
- (Nigeria) Elkana Ibrahim
- (Nigeria) Kish Victor
- (South Africa) Andrew Hobson
- (South Africa) Zenani Kraai
- (South Africa) Ryan Mann
- (South Africa) Senzwesihle Ngubane
- (Zambia) Alfred Mpande
- (Zambia) Isaac Mutale

Source: FIH

== See also ==
- 2025 Women's Hockey Africa Cup of Nations
