= Nicholas Spooner (field hockey) =

South African field hockey player

Personal information
- Full name: Nicholas Balfour Spooner
- Born: 28 August 1991 (age 34)

Sport
- Sport: Field hockey
- Position: Midfielder/Centre link
- Club: Harvestehuder THC
National team
Years	Team	Caps	Goals
2014-present	South Africa	51	(8)
Medal record
Africa Cup of Nations
Gold medal – first place	2022 Accra
Gold medal – first place	2025 Ismailia

Nicholas Balfour Spooner (born 28 August 1991) is a South African field hockey player. He competed in the 2020 Summer Olympics.

Spooner was educated at Hilton College.
