= Hockey Association of Malawi =

Governing body of field hockey in Malawi

Hockey Association of Malawi HAM
- IOC nation: MAW
- Sport: Field hockey
- Year of formation: 1934

Affiliations
- International federation: International Hockey Federation (IHF)
- Continental association: African Hockey Federation (AHF)

Elected
- President: Wanthaza Mduduzi Mughogho
- Secretary General: Daniel Chitsulo

The Hockey Association of Malawi (HAM) is the governing body of field hockey in Malawi. Its headquarters are in Limbe, Malawi. It is affiliated to IHF International Hockey Federation and AHF African Hockey Federation.

Torchalan Tochi Gill is the president of Hockey Association of Malawi, and Dr Lameck Fiwa is the general secretary.

== History ==
malawi hockey club history +6 Field hockey in Malawi is governed by the Hockey Association of Malawi (HAM), headquartered in Limbe. Originally formed in 1934, the sport experienced a major turning point in 2016 when HAM won the International Hockey Federation's (FIH) Pablo Negre Award. This award provided funding to construct Malawi's first artificial turf pitch at the National Hockey Stadium in the Kamuzu Stadium complex in Blantyre, officially opening on October 18, 2020.Domestically, the landscape features several top-flight teams. The Nyala Hockey Club, based in Blantyre, is recognized as the country's most decorated club, having been established in 1988 and claiming over 50 trophies. Other active clubs include the Genetrix women's team and Mpingwe Sports Club.In 2023, Malawi reached a new continental milestone by hosting the prestigious Africa Cup for Club Champions (ACCC) tournament at the Blantyre stadium. At the international level, the national men's under-21 team made its debut in 2024 at the Zambezi Test Series in Lusaka, Zambia.

== See also ==
- African Hockey Federation
