= Libyan Hockey Federation =

The General National Hockey Federation or Libyan Hockey Federation is the governing body of field hockey in Libya, Africa. Its headquarters are in Tripoli, Libya. It is affiliated to International Hockey Federation and African Hockey Federation.

Salah Abdussalam Mhanni is the president of Hockey Association of Libya and Haitem Mohammed Saleem is performing the responsibilities of the general secretary.

== See also ==
- African Hockey Federation
