= Royal Moroccan Hockey Federation =

Royal Moroccan Hockey Federation Fédération Royale Marocaine de Hockey
- Sport: Field Hockey
- Jurisdiction: Morocco
- Founded: November 15, 1958
- Affiliation: FIH
- Regional affiliation: AHF
- President: Kamal Ghallali
- (founded): Fédération Royale Marocaine de Hockey
- (Morocco)

== History ==
The Royal Moroccan Hockey Federation (French: Fédération Royale Marocaine de Hockey) is the governing body for field hockey in Morocco. It is affiliated with the International Hockey Federation (FIH) and the African Hockey Federation (AfHF), and is headquartered in Casablanca. The federation was established on 15 November 1958. During its early years, field hockey was primarily played in Casablanca and saw little development elsewhere in the country.

Following decades of limited domestic activity and international participation, the federation began a renewed effort to develop the sport, with a particular focus on women's hockey. As field hockey remains a minor sport in Morocco and there are currently no established national domestic competitions comparable to those in Europe, the federation has focused on recruiting players of Moroccan heritage who compete for clubs abroad, particularly in the Netherlands and Belgium. The long-term objective of the programme is to establish a sustainable national team while promoting the growth of hockey within Morocco itself. According to head coach Rob Haantjes, the ultimate ambition is to qualify for the 2032 Summer Olympics in Brisbane, while simultaneously creating the foundations for the sport in Morocco, where no dedicated hockey pitches currently exist.

== Women's national team revival ==
The current Morocco women's national team was formed in 2025 as part of the federation's renewed international programme. Head coach Rob Haantjes and assistant coach Niels de Brouwer were appointed to build a completely new squad, largely consisting of young players with Moroccan roots who play club hockey in Europe. Around fifty players expressed interest during the initial recruitment process, from which a first national selection was assembled. Most members of the squad compete in the Netherlands, while others are based in Belgium and other European countries. The majority of the players are still active in youth competitions, making Morocco one of the youngest emerging national teams in international field hockey.

The team trains regularly in the Netherlands, with training sessions initially taking place in Utrecht . From September 2026, SBHC Xenios became the team's permanent training base through a partnership between the Royal Moroccan Hockey Federation, SBHC Xenios and Rabobank Amsterdam. The partnership aims not only to support the development of the national team but also to encourage greater diversity and accessibility within the sport of hockey.

In 2026, Morocco played its first official international matches against Gibraltar. The team recorded victories by 1–0 and 2–0, becoming eligible for inclusion in the FIH World Rankings for the first time. Shortly afterwards, Morocco continued its international programme by playing two further matches in the Netherlands: a friendly defeat against Ukraine followed by a victory over Luxembourg. These matches formed part of the federation's strategy to gain international experience and improve its position in the FIH rankings ahead of future African competitions.

The squad consists of players representing clubs across different competitive levels in the Netherlands and Belgium. One of the most prominent members is Amina Addou (number 5), who previously made her debut in the Dutch Hoofdklasse with AH&BC Amsterdam, and now plays for Huizer Hockey Club in the Promotie klasse. Addou serves as one of Morocco's captains and has stated that she hopes the project will inspire a new generation of Moroccan girls to take up hockey. She previously represented the South Holland district selection together with fellow captain Sofia Mounji (number 6), who plays for Klein Zwitserland in the Dutch Overgangsklasse.

Other members of the national team include Meryam Bnamiri (number 22, goalkeeper) and Lina Saccal (number 7), both of whom play for MHV Maarssen in the Netherlands. The squad also features Aleyna Houthuijzen (number 2), Maysa Houthuijzen (number 3), and Dina Amkari (number 10), all of whom developed through the youth academy of Hurley. In Belgium, cousins Rania El Abbd (number 1, goalkeeper) and Omeima Chouih (number 29) play for Hasselt Stix. The squad also includes several additional players from clubs across Europe whose international careers are still in the early stages. Limited information is available online about many of these players, possibly because some of them are still at a very young age and have only recently begun their careers.

According to Haantjes, the young age profile of the squad is considered one of its greatest strengths for the future. While only a small number of players have reached senior level, the federation has also established a development squad to create a long-term pathway for talented players of Moroccan heritage. The programme aims to expand further by identifying eligible players throughout Europe while simultaneously supporting the development of field hockey within Morocco itself.

== See also ==
- African Hockey Federation
