= Field hockey at the African Games =

- Most recent season or competition: Field hockey at the 2023 African Games
- Formerly: Field hockey at the All-Africa Games
- Sport: Field hockey
- Founded: 1987
- Continent: Africa (AfHF)
- Most recent champions: M: Egypt (3rd title); W: Ghana (1st title)
- Most titles: M: Egypt (3 titles); W: South Africa (3 titles)

Field hockey has been an African Games event since the fourth edition in 1987 in Nairobi, Kenya. It last featured on the games programme in 2003. It is set to return at the 2023 African Games in Accra, Ghana.

== Men's tournament ==
=== Results ===
Year	Host	Gold medal match			Bronze medal match			Number of teams
Year	Host	Winner	Score	Runner-up	Third place	Score	Fourth place	Number of teams
1987; Details	Nairobi, Kenya	Kenya	Round-robin	Zimbabwe	Nigeria	Round-robin	Egypt	7
1991; Details	Cairo, Egypt	Egypt	Round-robin	Kenya	Zimbabwe	Round-robin	Ghana	5
1995; Details	Harare, Zimbabwe	South Africa	Round-robin	Egypt	Kenya	Round-robin	Zimbabwe	6
1999; Details	Johannesburg, South Africa	South Africa	Round-robin	Egypt	Kenya	Round-robin	Zimbabwe	6
2003; Details	Abuja, Nigeria	Egypt	3–2 (a.e.t.)	South Africa	Ghana	2–1	Nigeria	5
2023; Details	Accra, Ghana	Egypt	2–2 (3–1 s.o.)	Ghana	Nigeria	2–1	Kenya	4

=== Summary ===
Team	Gold medal	Silver medal	Bronze medal	Fourth place
Egypt	3 (1991*, 2003, 2023)	2 (1995, 1999)		1 (1987)
South Africa	2 (1995, 1999*)	1 (2003)		
Kenya	1 (1987*)	1 (1991)	2 (1995, 1999)	1 (2023)
Zimbabwe		1 (1987)	1 (1991)	2 (1995*, 1999)
Ghana		1 (2023*)	1 (2003)	1 (1991)
Nigeria			2 (1987, 2023)	1 (2003*)

* = hosts

=== Team appearances ===
Team	(Kenya) 1987	(Egypt) 1991	(Zimbabwe) 1995	(South Africa) 1999	(Nigeria) 2003	(Ghana) 2023	Total
Egypt	4th	1st	2nd	2nd	1st	1st	6
Ghana	5th	4th	–	5th	3rd	2nd	5
Kenya	1st	2nd	3rd	3rd	–	4th	5
Malawi	–	–	–	6th	–	–	1
Namibia	–	–	5th	–	–	–	1
Nigeria	3rd	5th	6th	–	4th	3rd	5
South Africa	–	–	1st	1st	2nd	WD	4
Tanzania	6th	–	–	–	–	–	1
Zambia	7th	–	–	–	–	–	1
Zimbabwe	2nd	3rd	4th	4th	5th	–	6
Total	7	5	6	6	5	4	

== Women's tournament ==
=== Results ===
Year	Host	Gold medal match			Bronze medal match			Number of teams
Year	Host	Winner	Score	Runner-up	Third place	Score	Fourth place	Number of teams
1995; Details	Harare, Zimbabwe	South Africa	Round-robin	Zimbabwe	Kenya	Round-robin	Namibia	6
1999; Details	Johannesburg, South Africa	South Africa	8–0	Zimbabwe	Kenya	3–2	Namibia	4
2003; Details	Abuja, Nigeria	South Africa	10–0	Nigeria	Kenya	2–1	Ghana	6
2023; Details	Accra, Ghana	Ghana	0–0 (4–3 s.o.)	Nigeria	Kenya	Only three teams		3

=== Summary ===
Team	Gold medal	Silver medal	Bronze medal	Fourth place
South Africa	3 (1995, 1999*, 2003)			
Ghana	1 (2023*)			1 (2003)
Zimbabwe		2 (1995*, 1999)		
Nigeria		2 (2003*, 2023)		
Kenya			4 (1995, 1999, 2003, 2023)	
Namibia				2 (1995, 1999)

* = hosts

=== Team appearances ===
Team	(Zimbabwe) 1995	(South Africa) 1999	(Nigeria) 2003	(Ghana) 2023	Total
Ghana	6th	–	4th	1st	3
Kenya	3rd	3rd	3rd	3rd	4
Namibia	4th	4th	6th	–	3
Nigeria	5th	–	2nd	2nd	3
South Africa	1st	1st	1st	WD	4
Zimbabwe	2nd	2nd	5th	–	3
Total	6	4	6	3	

== Medal table ==
=== Total ===
Rank	Nation	Gold	Silver	Bronze	Total
1	South Africa (RSA)	5	1	0	6
2	Egypt (EGY)	3	2	0	5
3	Kenya (KEN)	1	1	6	8
4	Ghana (GHA)	1	1	1	3
5	Zimbabwe (ZIM)	0	3	1	4
6	Nigeria (NGR)	0	2	2	4
Totals (6 entries)		10	10	10	30

=== Men ===
Rank	Nation	Gold	Silver	Bronze	Total
1	Egypt	3	2	0	5
2	South Africa	2	1	0	3
3	Kenya	1	1	2	4
4	Ghana	0	1	1	2
4	Zimbabwe	0	1	1	2
6	Nigeria	0	0	2	2
Totals (6 entries)		6	6	6	18

=== Women ===
Rank	Nation	Gold	Silver	Bronze	Total
1	South Africa	3	0	0	3
2	Ghana	1	0	0	1
3	Nigeria	0	2	0	2
3	Zimbabwe	0	2	0	2
5	Kenya	0	0	4	4
Totals (5 entries)		4	4	4	12

== See also ==
- Men's African Olympic Qualifier
- Men's Hockey Africa Cup of Nations
- Women's African Olympic Qualifier
- Women's Hockey Africa Cup of Nations
