= 2011 African Olympic Qualifier (field hockey) =

Tournament details
- Host country: Zimbabwe
- City: Bulawayo
- Dates: 2–11 September
- Venue: Khumalo Hockey Stadium

The 2011 African Olympic Qualifier was the second edition of the African field hockey qualification tournament for the Summer Olympics for men and women. It was held from 2 to 11 September in Bulawayo, Zimbabwe.

Six teams competed in the men's tournament, while four women's teams participated. The winner of each tournament qualified for the field hockey competition at the 2012 Summer Olympics. More teams were originally entered, but later withdrew.

== Men's tournament ==
2011 Men's African Olympic Qualifier
Tournament details
- Host country: Zimbabwe
- City: Bulawayo
- Dates: 2–11 September
- Teams: 6 (from 1 confederation)
- Venue: Khumalo Hockey Stadium

Final positions
- Champions: South Africa (2nd title)
- Runner-up: Egypt
- Third place: Ghana

Tournament statistics
- Matches played: 17
- Goals scored: 121 (7.12 per match)

=== Pool ===
Pos	Team	Pld	W	D	L	GF	GA	GD	Pts	Qualification
1	South Africa	5	4	1	0	42	5	+37	13	Final
2	Egypt	5	2	3	0	28	8	+20	9	Final
3	Kenya	5	2	2	1	24	14	+10	8	Third place game
4	Ghana	5	2	2	1	16	8	+8	8	Third place game
5	Zimbabwe (H)	5	0	1	4	1	26	−25	1	Fifth place game
6	Morocco	5	0	1	4	3	53	−50	1	Fifth place game

Source: TheSports.org
(H) Hosts

2 September 2011
13:00

South Africa	18–0	Morocco

2 September 2011
15:00

Ghana	2–2	Kenya

2 September 2011
17:00

Egypt	5–0	Zimbabwe

4 September 2011
14:00

Morocco	0–6	Ghana

4 September 2011
16:00

Egypt	3–3	Kenya

4 September 2011
18:00

South Africa	10–0	Zimbabwe

5 September 2011
14:00

Morocco	1–16	Egypt

5 September 2011
16:00

Ghana	0–4	South Africa

5 September 2011
18:00

Kenya	4–0	Zimbabwe

7 September 2011
14:00

Kenya	12–1	Morocco

7 September 2011
16:00

Zimbabwe	0–6	Ghana

7 September 2011
18:00

Egypt	2–2	South Africa

9 September 2011
14:00

South Africa	8–3	Kenya

9 September 2011
16:00

Ghana	2–2	Egypt

9 September 2011
18:00

Zimbabwe	1–1	Morocco

=== Classification round ===
==== Fifth and sixth place ====
10 September 2011
16:00

Zimbabwe	NP	Morocco

- The game was not played, Zimbabwe finished 5th, Morocco in 6th place.

==== Third and fourth place ====
11 September 2011
12:30

Kenya	1–5	Ghana

==== Final ====
11 September 2011
17:30

South Africa	1–0	Egypt

=== Final standings ===
Rank	Team
1st place, gold medalist(s)	South Africa
2nd place, silver medalist(s)	Egypt
3rd place, bronze medalist(s)	Ghana
4	Kenya
5	Zimbabwe
6	Morocco

Qualified for the 2012 Summer Olympics

Qualified for the Olympic qualification tournaments

== Women's tournament ==
2011 Women's African Olympic Qualifier
Tournament details
- Host country: Zimbabwe
- City: Bulawayo
- Dates: 3–11 September
- Teams: 4 (from 1 confederation)
- Venue: Khumalo Hockey Stadium

Final positions
- Champions: South Africa (2nd title)
- Runner-up: Kenya
- Third place: Ghana

Tournament statistics
- Matches played: 8
- Goals scored: 35 (4.38 per match)

=== Pool ===
Pos	Team	Pld	W	D	L	GF	GA	GD	Pts	Qualification
1	South Africa	3	3	0	0	19	0	+19	9	Final
2	Kenya	3	1	1	1	3	10	−7	4	Final
3	Ghana	3	0	2	1	1	4	−3	2	Third place game
4	Zimbabwe (H)	3	0	1	2	0	9	−9	1	Third place game

Source: TheSports.org
(H) Hosts

3 September 2011
16:00

South Africa	9–0	Kenya

3 September 2011
18:00

Ghana	0–0	Zimbabwe

5 September 2011
10:00

Ghana	0–3	South Africa

5 September 2011
12:00

Kenya	2–0	Zimbabwe

8 September 2011
14:00

Kenya	1–1	Ghana

8 September 2011
16:00

Zimbabwe	0–7	South Africa

==== Third place game ====
10 September 2011
18:30

Ghana	4–3	Zimbabwe

==== Final ====
11 September 2011
15:00

South Africa	5–0	Kenya
