= 2015 African Olympic Qualifier (field hockey) =

African Hockey Championships

Tournament details
- Host country: South Africa
- City: Randburg
- Dates: 23 October – 1 November 2015
- Venue: Randburg Hockey Stadium

The 2015 African Olympic Qualifier was the third edition of the African Olympic Qualifier for Men and Women. It was held from 23 October to 1 November 2015 in Randburg, South Africa. Nine teams competed in the men's and seven in the women's tournament. The winner of the tournament qualified for the 2016 Summer Olympics.

On 30 October South African Sports Confederation and Olympic Committee (SASCOC) published a statement reiterating that it will not consider qualifying though the continental qualifying tournament acceptable. SASCOC and the South African Hockey Association had previously specified 2014-15 FIH Hockey World League as the only Olympic selection route for the South Africa men's and women's national field hockey teams.

All times are local (UTC+2).

== Men's tournament ==
2015 Men's African Olympic Qualifier
Tournament details
- Host country: South Africa
- City: Randburg
- Dates: 23 October – 1 November 2015
- Teams: 9 (from 1 confederation)

Final positions
- Champions: South Africa (3rd title)
- Runner-up: Egypt
- Third place: Kenya

Tournament statistics
- Matches played: 23
- Goals scored: 223 (9.7 per match)
- Top scorer: (South Africa) Matthew Guise-Brown (16 goals)

=== Preliminary round ===
==== Group A ====
Pos	Team	Pld	W	D	L	GF	GA	GD	Pts	Qualification
1	South Africa	4	4	0	0	61	0	+61	12	Advance to semifinals
2	Ghana	4	3	0	1	36	6	+30	9	Advance to semifinals
3	Zimbabwe	4	2	0	2	27	23	+4	6	Advance to fifth place game
4	Namibia	4	1	0	3	8	22	−14	3	
5	Botswana	4	0	0	4	0	81	−81	0	

Source: FIH.ch
Rules for classification: 1) points; 2) goal difference; 3) goals scored; 4) head-to-head result.

23 October 2015
16:45

Namibia	5–0 (forfeit)	Botswana
	Report

Umpires:
Bryn Lowe (ZIM)
Aziz Adimah (GHA)

23 October 2015
19:00

Zimbabwe	0–16	South Africa
	Report	Guise-Brown 3', 16', 17', 27', 45'; De Voux 3', 31'; Pautz 5'; Norris-Jones 10', 20', 56'; Panther 29', 49'; Malgraff 52', 54'; Sibbald 58'

Umpires:
Andrés Ortiz (ESP)
Peter Kabaso (KEN)

24 October 2015
15:30

Ghana	5–0	Namibia
Botsio 17', 36'; Baiden 46'; Nsalbini 50'; Akaba 59'	Report

Umpires:
Eduardo Lizana (ESP)
Scott Tarr (RSA)

24 October 2015
16:45

South Africa	30–0	Botswana
De Voux 1', 7', 7', 29', 45+', 50'; Hykes 9', 38', 57'; Guise-Brown 10', 12', 23', 41'; Panther 15', 15', 35', 43', 44', 55'; Robinson 18', 60'; Eustice 21', 26', 45'; Drummond 22'; Bell 36'; Malgraff 37'; Sibbald 42'; Pautz 54'; Da Grace 59'	Report

Umpires:
Alfred Akrong (GHA)
Ahmed El-Sayed (EGY)

26 October 2015
12:15

Ghana	27–0	Botswana
Moses 2', 7', 34'; Sam 3', 15', 38'; Nsalbini 6', 24', 40'; Ntiamoah 17'; Botsio 20', 25', 29', 31', 36', 44', 46', 48'; Ankomah 21'; Asiedu 29'; Adjei 41', 53'; Akaba 41'; Akaba 42', 46'; Baiden 47', 50'	Report

Umpires:
Abdulkadir Mukaddam (TAN)
Bryn Lowe (ZIM)

26 October 2015
14:30

Zimbabwe	6–3	Namibia
Williams 7', 38', 58', 59'; Starch 14'; Ullrich 47'	Report	Fick 13'; La 54'; Martins 59'

Umpires:
Eduardo Lizana (ESP)
Peter Kabaso (KEN)

27 October 2015
12:15

Botswana	0–19	Zimbabwe
	Report	Ashley 6', 52', 55'; Ullrich 9', 26', 40', 42'; Mpofu 9'; Williams 15', 30', 35', 36', 48', 59'; Trethowan 29', 36', 45', 45'; Maredza 41'

Umpires:
Kirk Mendoza (RSA)
Aziz Adimah (GHA)

27 October 2015
19:00

Ghana	0–4	South Africa
	Report	Guise-Brown 20', 40'; Pautz 48'; Hykes 50'

Umpires:
Tony Fernandes (KEN)
Ahmed El-Sayed (EGY)

29 October 2015
14:30

Zimbabwe	2–4	Ghana
Mpofu 23'; Matambo 51'	Report	Akaba 10'; Botsio 16'; Tettey 29', 44'

Umpires:
Ahmed El-Sayed (EGY)
Scott Tarr (RSA)

29 October 2015
19:00

South Africa	11–0	Namibia
Guise-Brown 3', 24'; Pautz 10', 31'; Halkett 21'; Bell 28', 43'; Hykes 33', 55'; De Voux 42'; Panther 53'	Report

Umpires:
Abdulkadir Mukaddam (TAN)
Andrés Ortiz (ESP)

==== Group B ====
Pos	Team	Pld	W	D	L	GF	GA	GD	Pts	Qualification
1	Egypt	3	3	0	0	34	1	+33	9	Advance to semifinals
2	Kenya	3	2	0	1	11	5	+6	6	Advance to semifinals
3	Nigeria	3	1	0	2	4	11	−7	3	Advance to fifth place game
4	Tanzania	3	0	0	3	0	32	−32	0	

Source: FIH.ch
Rules for classification: 1) points; 2) goal difference; 3) goals scored; 4) head-to-head result.

25 October 2015
14:30

Kenya	3–1	Nigeria
Wakhungu 30'; Wokila 33'; Saina 59'	Report	Victor 21'

Umpires:
Kirk Mendoza (RSA)
Aziz Adimah (GHA)

25 October 2015
16:45

Egypt	22–0	Tanzania
Sayed 2'; Edris 4', 41'; El-Naggar 5', 54'; Mamdouh 7', 8', 9', 10', 11', 48', 55', 59'; Mohsen 12'; Nasr 15'; El-Hady 24', 31'; Said 33'; Ibrahim 43'; Mansour 40', 52'; Atef 59'	Report

Umpires:
Tony Fernandes (KEN)
Garba Asura (NGA)

26 October 2015
16:45

Kenya	1–4	Egypt
Msumba 51'	Report	Edris 8'; Mamdouh 23', 49'; El-Naggar 37'

Umpires:
Andrés Ortiz (ESP)
Alfred Akrong (GHA)

27 October 2015
14:00

Tanzania	0–3	Nigeria
	Report	Victor 13', 42'; Maraz 40'

Umpires:
Scott Tarr (RSA)
Bryn Lowe (ZIM)

28 October 2015
14:30

Tanzania	0–7	Kenya
	Report	Mutria 11'; Magomere 35', 45'; Msumba 48'; Saina 49', 50'; Wakhura 53'

Umpires:
Garba Asura (NGA)
Alfred Akrong (GHA)

28 October 2015
16:45

Egypt	8–0	Nigeria
Mamdouh 5', 13', 27', 35'; Ibrahim 15', 29'; Edris 28'; Essam 42'	Report

Umpires:
Bryn Lowe (ZIM)
Peter Kabaso (KEN)

=== Knockout stage ===
Semi-finals
31 October
South Africa	2
Kenya	1
31 October
Egypt	7
Ghana	1

Final
1 November
South Africa	4
Egypt	2
Third place
1 November
Kenya	4
Ghana	3

==== 7–9th place semifinal ====
30 October 2015
16:30

Botswana	1–3	Tanzania
Ngara 45'	Report	Visran 18'; Issa 25'; Mayuma 55'

Umpires:
Kirk Mendoza (RSA)
Garba Asura (NGA)

==== Semifinals ====
31 October 2015
14:00

Egypt	7–1	Ghana
Adel 6'; Mamdouh 7'; Said 26'; Edris 30'; Ahmed El-Naggar 35'; Hassan 53', 56'	Report	Baiden 37'

Umpires:
Eduardo Lizana (ESP)
Scott Tarr (RSA)

31 October 2015
16:30

South Africa	2–1	Kenya
Norris-Jones 51'; De Voux 55'	Report	Mutria 48'

Umpires:
Andrés Ortiz (ESP)
Aziz Adimah (GHA)

==== Seventh place game ====
1 November 2015
14:30

Namibia	10–0	Tanzania
Jeffery 15'; Fick 21'; Jacobs 22', 49'; Martins 25', 38'; Kruger 30'; Swartbooi 40'; Cleak 41'; Bartlett 48'	Report

Umpires:
Garba Asura (NGA)
Bryn Lowe (ZIM)

==== Fifth place game ====
31 October 2015
19:00

Zimbabwe	2–2	Nigeria
Ullrich 58'; Mutupo 60'	Report	Victor 5'; Maraz 47'
Penalties
Rixon-Fuller (penalty shoot-out missed); Williams (penalty shoot-out scored); Mutupo (penalty shoot-out missed); Ullrich (penalty shoot-out scored); Maredza (penalty shoot-out missed); Ullrich (penalty shoot-out missed)	2–3	(penalty shoot-out scored) Izang; (penalty shoot-out missed) Mamman; (penalty shoot-out scored) Inuwa; (penalty shoot-out missed) Fowobaje; (penalty shoot-out missed) Linus; (penalty shoot-out scored) Inuwa

Umpires:
Ahmed El-Sayed (EGY)
Alfred Akrong (GHA)

==== Third place game ====
1 November 2015
14:00

Ghana	3–4	Kenya
Nsalbini 17'; Baiden 38'; Sam 50'	Report	Kuloba 10'; Wakhungu 26'; Magomere 34'; Mutria 39'

Umpires:
Andrés Ortiz (ESP)
Kirk Mendoza (RSA)

==== Final ====
1 November 2015
16:30

Egypt	2–4	South Africa
Ghobran 36'; El-Naggar 48'	Report	Guise-Brown 47', 48', 59'; Norris-Jones 60'

Umpires:
Eduardo Lizana (ESP)
Aziz Adimah (GHA)

=== Final standings ===
Qualified for the 2016 Olympics

Rank	Team
1st place, gold medalist(s)	South Africa
2nd place, silver medalist(s)	Egypt
3rd place, bronze medalist(s)	Kenya
4	Ghana
5	Nigeria
6	Zimbabwe
7	Namibia
8	Tanzania
9	Botswana

=== Goalscorers ===
There have been 218 goals scored in 23 matches, for an average of 9.48 goals per match.

16 goals

- (South Africa) Matthew Guise-Brown

15 goals

- (Egypt) Mahmoud Mamdouh

11 goals

- (Ghana) Johnny Botsio

10 goals

- (South Africa) Jean-Pierre de Voux
- (Zimbabwe) Matthew Williams

9 goals

- (South Africa) Brandon Panther

6 goals

- (South Africa) Julian Hykes
- (Zimbabwe) Warwick Ullrich

5 goals

- (Egypt) Mohamed Edris
- (Egypt) Ahmed El-Naggar
- (Ghana) Michael Baiden
- (Ghana) Salya Nsalbini
- (South Africa) Lloyd Norris-Jones
- (South Africa) Richard Pautz

4 goals

- (Ghana) Benedict Sam
- (Nigeria) Kish Victor
- (Zimbabwe) Peter Trethowan

3 goals

- (Egypt) Amr Ibrahim
- (Ghana) Elikem Akaba
- (Ghana) Isaac Moses
- (Kenya) Leon Magomere
- (Kenya) George Mutria
- (Kenya) Brian Saina
- (Namibia) Siyabonga Martins
- (South Africa) Daniel Bell
- (South Africa) Jethro Eustice
- (South Africa) Ignatius Malgraff
- (Zimbabwe) Dominic Ashley

2 goals

- (Egypt) Amr Elhady
- (Egypt) Mohamed Hassan
- (Egypt) Mostafa Mansour
- (Egypt) Ashraf Said
- (Ghana) Richard Adjei
- (Ghana) Emmanuel Akaba
- (Ghana) Francis Tettey
- (Kenya) Zakaria Msumba
- (Kenya) Maxwell Wakhungu
- (Namibia) Lennard Fick
- (Namibia) Pieter Jacobs
- (Nigeria) Shanwilu Mu'azu
- (South Africa) Jonathan Robinson
- (South Africa) Daniel Sibbald
- (Zimbabwe) Arnold Mpofu

1 goal

- (Botswana) Eddie Ngara
- (Egypt) Hamada Atef
- (Egypt) Mohamed Essam
- (Egypt) Houssam Ghobran
- (Egypt) Ahmed Mohsen
- (Egypt) Mohamed Nasr
- (Egypt) Amr Sayed
- (Egypt) Mohamed Zaki
- (Ghana) Emmanuel Ankomah
- (Ghana) George Asiedu
- (Ghana) Alfred Ntiamoah
- (Kenya) Derric Kuloba
- (Kenya) Constant Wakhura
- (Kenya) Samwel Wokila
- (Namibia) Russel Bartlett
- (Namibia) Brynn Cleak
- (Namibia) Wayne Jeffery
- (Namibia) Riaan Kruger
- (Namibia) Heinrich Swartbooi
- (Namibia) Dian la Cock
- (South Africa) Tim Drummond
- (South Africa) Rhett Halkett
- (South Africa) Miguel da Graca
- (Tanzania) Sultan Issa
- (Tanzania) Castro Mayuma
- (Tanzania) Deep Visran
- (Zimbabwe) Tendayi Maredza
- (Zimbabwe) Pritchard Matambo
- (Zimbabwe) Donald Mutupo
- (Zimbabwe) Cydreck Starch

Source: FIH

== Women's tournament ==
2015 Men's African Olympic Qualifier
Tournament details
- Host country: South Africa
- City: Randburg
- Dates: 23 October – 1 November 2015
- Teams: 7 (from 1 confederation)

Final positions
- Champions: South Africa (3rd title)
- Runner-up: Ghana
- Third place: Kenya

Tournament statistics
- Matches played: 21
- Goals scored: 147 (7 per match)
- Top scorer: (South Africa) Lilian du Plessis (18 goals)

=== Pool ===
Pos	Team	Pld	W	D	L	GF	GA	GD	Pts	Qualification
1	South Africa	6	6	0	0	68	0	+68	18	Qualified to 2016 Summer Olympics
2	Ghana	6	4	1	1	22	7	+15	13	
3	Kenya	6	3	1	2	13	18	−5	10	
4	Namibia	6	3	0	3	16	10	+6	9	
5	Zimbabwe	6	2	0	4	12	15	−3	6	
6	Nigeria	6	2	0	4	16	23	−7	6	
7	Tanzania	6	0	0	6	0	74	−74	0	

Source: FIH.ch
Rules for classification: 1) points; 2) goal difference; 3) goals scored; 4) head-to-head result.

=== Results ===
23 October 2015
14:00

Tanzania	0–9	Zimbabwe
	Report	Viviers 18', 56', 58'; Evans 20'; Brooke 30+'; Williams 35'; Kaulback 38', 40'; Johnson 43'

Umpires:
Caren Ouma (KEN)
Deborah Agunda (KEN)

23 October 2015
16:30

Ghana	2–1	Nigeria
Safoa 18'; Adampa 56'	Report	Ovoh 45'

Umpires:
Stephanie Judefind (USA)
Chantelle Birtz (RSA)

23 October 2015
16:45

Kenya	2–0	Namibia
Aura 20'; Omaido 34'	Report

Umpires:
Sharne Meyers (ZIM)
Lyndal Robertson (RSA)

24 October 2015
12:15

Kenya	2–0	Zimbabwe
Nekesa 5'; Omaido 25'	Report

Umpires:
Cynthia Clement (GHA)
Chantelle Britz (RSA)

24 October 2015
13:15

Ghana	1–0	Namibia
Umaru 53'	Report

Umpires:
Jummai Sule (NGA)
Lyndal Robertson (RSA)

24 October 2015
14:30

South Africa	15–0	Nigeria
Coston 6', 45'; Du Plessis 7', 9', 20', 53', 58'; Mayne 11', 28', 53'; Deetlefs 17'; Manuel 33'; Marks 35', 36'; Britz 40'	Report

Umpires:
Sharne Meyers (ZIM)
Caren Ouma (KEN)

26 October 2015
14:00

Ghana	4–0	Zimbabwe
Korwu 27'; Safoa 28'; Opoku 35'; Bamfo 54'	Report

Umpires:
Caren Ouma (KEN)
Lyndal Robertson (RSA)

26 October 2015
16:30

Kenya	5–0	Tanzania
Ommala 5'; Karanja 8'; Juma 18'; Omaido 34'; Guchu 38'	Report

Umpires:
Stephanie Judefind (USA)
Jummai Sule (NGA)

26 October 2015
19:00

South Africa	5–0	Namibia
Walraven 19', 40'; Du Plessis 35'; Deetlefs 42', 48'	Report

Umpires:
Deborah Agunda (KEN)
Cynthia Clement (GHA)

27 October 2015
14:30

Ghana	12–0	Tanzania
Opoku 7', 17', 22'; Mills 10'; Boakye 20', 49'; Afriyie 26'; Umaru 27', 60'; Safoa 50', 52', 56'	Report

Umpires:
Sharne Meyers (ZIM)
Jummai Sule (NGA)

27 October 2015
16:30

Namibia	3–1	Nigeria
Venter 2'; Davin 9'; Mengo 18'	Report	Udoh 8'

Umpires:
Chantelle Britz (NGA)
Caren Ouma (KEN)

27 October 2015
16:45

South Africa	6–0	Zimbabwe
Du Plessis 16', 56'; Mayne 22'; Walraven 27'; Manuel 49'; Davids 52'	Report

Umpires:
Stephanie Judefind (USA)
Deborah Agunda (KEN)

29 October 2015
12:15

Zimbabwe	1–2	Namibia
Williams 40'	Report	Venter 4', 57'

Umpires:
Lyndal Robertson (RSA)
Chantelle Birtz (RSA)

29 October 2015
14:00

Tanzania	0–10	Nigeria
	Report	Bulus 9'; Onyedum 12', 33', 48', 52'; Ovoh 20', 38'; Bethel 34'; Nnanna 41'; John 52'

Umpires:
Sharne Meyers (ZIM)
Deborah Agunda (KEN)

29 October 2015
16:45

South Africa	12–0	Kenya
Njogu 9', 16', 60+'; Coston 11', 36', 47'; Juma 20', 44'; Mutiva 26', 28', 30'; Nekesa 48'	Report

Umpires:
Cynthia Clement (GHA)
Stephanie Judefind (USA)

30 October 2015
12:00

Zimbabwe	2–1	Nigeria
Palmer 10'; Williams 27'	Report	Ovoh 39'

Umpires:
Cynthia Clement (GHA)
Caren Ouma (KEN)

30 October 2015
14:15

Ghana	3–3	Kenya
Opoku 1'; Umaru 44'; Mills 55'	Report	Nekesa 33'; Karanja 52'; Omaido 53'

Umpires:
Stephanie Judefind (USA)
Lyndal Robertson (RSA)

30 October 2015
19:00

South Africa	27–0	Tanzania
Du Plessis 9', 18', 28', 36', 41', 59'; Coston 11', 36', 48'; Manuel 12'; Marks 21', 24', 56'; Britz 22'; Chamberlain 31', 43', 46', 47', 47', 54', 59'; Mayne 43', 58'; Russell 44', 46'; Bright 50'; Davids 51'	Report

Umpires:
Sharne Meyers (ZIM)
Jummai Sule (NGA)

1 November 2015
09:00

Tanzania	0–11	Namibia
	Report	Van Taak 6'; Duvenhage 10', 17'; Louis 11', 58'; Botha 20', 24', 43', 51'; Brink 44'; Gerber 60'

Umpires:
Deborah Agunda (KEN)
Cynthia Clement (GHA)

1 November 2015
11:30

South Africa	3–0	Ghana
Mayne 7'; Chamberlain 15'; Du Plessis 31'	Report

Umpires:
Stephanie Judefind (USA)
Caren Ouma (KEN)

1 November 2015
12:00

Kenya	1–3	Nigeria
Nekesa 3'	Report	Ovoh 17', 35', 58'

Umpires:
Chantelle Britz (RSA)
Lyndal Robertson (RSA)

=== Goalscorers ===
There have been 147 goals scored in 21 matches, for an average of 7 goals per match.

18 goals

- (South Africa) Lilian du Plessis

10 goals

- (South Africa) Dirkie Chamberlain

8 goals

- (South Africa) Bernadette Coston

7 goals

- (Nigeria) Eleho Ovo
- (South Africa) Jade Mayne

6 goals

- (South Africa) Candice Manuel

5 goals

- (Ghana) Elizabeth Opoku
- (Ghana) Martha Sarfoa
- (South Africa) Toni Marks

4 goals

- (Ghana) Nafisatu Umaru
- (Kenya) Audrey Omaido
- (Namibia) Ilanda Botha
- (Nigeria) Justina Onyedum

3 goals

- (Kenya) Teresa Nekesa Juma
- (Namibia) Marcia Venter
- (South Africa) Lisa-Marie Deetlefs
- (South Africa) Nicole Walraven
- (Zimbabwe) Roxanne Viviers
- (Zimbabwe) Michelle Williams

2 goals

- (Ghana) Serwaa Boakye
- (Ghana) Theresa Mills
- (Namibia) Zalia Duvenhage
- (Namibia) Ina Louis
- (South Africa) Tanya Britz
- (South Africa) Illse Davids
- (South Africa) Shelley Russell
- (Zimbabwe) Kelly Kaulback

1 goal

- (Ghana) Janet Adampa
- (Ghana) Lydia Afriyie
- (Ghana) Racheal Bamfo
- (Ghana) Joanita Korwu
- (Kenya) Lilian Aura
- (Kenya) Caroline Guchu
- (Kenya) Anne Juma
- (Kenya) Tracy Karanja
- (Kenya) Yvonne Karanja
- (Kenya) Betsy Ommala
- (Namibia) Bernice Brink
- (Namibia) Annalien Davin
- (Namibia) Phea Gerber
- (Namibia) Magreth Mengo
- (Namibia) Dunelle van Taak
- (Nigeria) Egw Bethel
- (Nigeria) Susan Bulus
- (Nigeria) Alfa John
- (Nigeria) Stella Nnanna
- (Nigeria) Precious Uddoh
- (South Africa) Tarryn Bright
- (South Africa) Celia Evans
- (Zimbabwe) Amy Brooke
- (Zimbabwe) Sarah Evans
- (Zimbabwe) Iman Johnson
- (Zimbabwe) Jenna Palmer

Source: FIH
