= Togolese Hockey Federation =

Sports governing body in Togo

Togolese Hockey Federation Fédération Togolaise de Hockey
- Sport: Field hockey
- Jurisdiction: Togo
- Abbreviation: FTH
- Founded: May 25, 2008; 18 years ago
- Affiliation: FIH
- Regional affiliation: AHF
- Headquarters: 86, rue de l’Evangile, B.P. 7160, Lomé
- President: Luc Kouassi Dofontien
- Secretary: Nyagbé Enyo Kokou
- (Togo)

The Togolese Hockey Federation (French: Fédération Togolaise de Hockey or FTH) is the governing body of field hockey in Togo, Africa. Its headquarters are in Lomé, Togo. It is affiliated to IHF International Hockey Federation and AHF African Hockey Federation.

Luc Dofontien is the president of Hockey Association of Togo, and Harald Nyagbe is the general secretary.

== See also ==
- African Hockey Federation
