= Ghana women's national field hockey team =

Ghana
- Association: Ghana Hockey Association
- Confederation: AfHF (Africa)
- Head Coach: Richmond Attipoe
- Manager: Rosemary Lamptey
- Captain: Elizabeth Opoku

FIH ranking
- Current: 32 (25 July 2026)

Africa Cup of Nations
- Appearances: 6 (first in 2005)
- Best result: (silver) 2nd (six times)

African Games
- Appearances: 3 (first in 1995)
- Best result: (gold) 1st (2023)
Medal record
Africa Cup of Nations
Silver medal – second place	2005 Pretoria
Silver medal – second place	2009 Accra
Silver medal – second place	2013 Nairobi
Silver medal – second place	2017 Ismailia
Silver medal – second place	2022 Accra
Silver medal – second place	2025 Ismailia
African Games
Gold medal – first place	2023 Accra	Team

The Ghana women's national field hockey team represents Ghana in women's international field hockey competitions.

Ghana participated in the Hockey World League in (2016–2017). In Round 1, they played in the African group with Kenya and Nigeria, winning both pool matches. In Round 2, which was played in Valencia in February 2017, they finished in 8th position.

Trainings and matches in preparation for international tournaments are held at the Theodosia Okoh Hockey Stadium in Accra.

== Tournament history ==
=== Africa Cup of Nations ===
- 2005 – (silver)
- 2009 – (silver)
- 2013 – (silver)
- 2017 – (silver)
- 2022 – (silver)
- 2025 – (silver)

=== African Games ===
- 1995 – 6th
- 2003 – 4th
- 2023 – (gold)

=== African Olympic Qualifier ===
- 2007 – (bronze)
- 2011 – (bronze)
- 2015 – (silver)
- 2019 – (silver)
- 2023 – 4th

=== Commonwealth Games ===
- 2018 – 10th
- 2022 – 10th

=== Hockey World League ===
- 2012–13 – 27th
- 2014–15 – 34th
- 2016–17 – 34th

== See also ==
- Ghana men's national field hockey team
