= 2023 Men's African Olympic Qualifier =

Field hockey tournament in Pretoria

African Hockey Road To Paris 2024

Tournament details
- Host country: South Africa
- City: Pretoria
- Dates: 29 October – 5 November
- Teams: 8 (from 1 confederation)
- Venue: University of Pretoria

Final positions
- Champions: South Africa (5th title)
- Runner-up: Egypt
- Third place: Ghana

Tournament statistics
- Matches played: 20
- Goals scored: 104 (5.2 per match)
- Top scorer: (South Africa) Matthew Guise-Brown (11 goals)
- Best goalkeeper: (Ghana) Benjamin Acquah
- Fair play award: Uganda

The 2023 Men's African Olympic Qualifier was the fifth edition of the African qualification tournament for the men's field hockey event at the Summer Olympics. It was held alongside the women's tournament in Pretoria, South Africa from 29 October to 5 November 2023.

South Africa, as the winner of the tournament, qualified for the 2024 Summer Olympics.

== Qualification ==
Qualification	Date	Host	Berths	Qualified team
FIH World Rankings	—N/a	—N/a	2	South Africa; Egypt
Northeast African Qualifying Tournament	6 June 2022	Cancelled	2	Kenya; Uganda
Northwest African Qualifying Tournament	25 August 2022	Cancelled	2	Ghana; Nigeria
FIH Central and South Africa Qualifying Tournament	31 August – 4 September 2022	(Zimbabwe) Harare	2	Zimbabwe; Zambia
Total			8	

== Preliminary round ==
All times are local (UTC+2).

=== Pool A ===
Pos	Team	Pld	W	D	L	GF	GA	GD	Pts	Qualification
1	South Africa (H)	3	3	0	0	29	2	+27	9	Semi-finals
2	Uganda	3	1	0	2	6	13	−7	3	Semi-finals
3	Nigeria	3	1	0	2	6	16	−10	3	Fifth to eighth place classification
4	Zimbabwe	3	1	0	2	5	15	−10	3	Fifth to eighth place classification

Source: FIH
Rules for classification: 1) points; 2) matches won; 3) goal difference; 4) goals for; 5) head-to-head result; 6) field goals for.
(H) Hosts

29 October 2023
19:00 (Note: The start time was moved back due to a lightning.)

South Africa	10–0	Zimbabwe
D. Cassiem 8'; Guise-Brown 17', 20', 35'; Ntuli 20', 36', 57'; M. Cassiem 29'; Van Tonder 49'; Kraai 58'	Report

University of Pretoria, Pretoria
Umpires:
Peter Kabaso (KEN)
Hisham Moaaz (EGY)

29 October 2023
20:00

Nigeria	0–5 (Note: Nigeria did not show up to the game and game was counted as a forfeit with a score of 5–0 in favour of Uganda.)	Uganda
	Report

University of Pretoria, Pretoria

30 October 2023
16:00

Zimbabwe	2–1	Uganda
M. Kanyangarara 24'; Kamusewu 47'	Report	Batusa 26'

University of Pretoria, Pretoria
Umpires:
Darren Hubach (RSA)
Hisham Moaaz (EGY)

30 October 2023
20:00

Nigeria	2–8	South Africa
Samaila 27', 38'	Report	Mvimbi 4'; Guise-Brown 17', 57'; Sherwood 30'; Ntuli 35'; Kok 46'; D. Cassiem 51'; M. Cassiem 54'

University of Pretoria, Pretoria
Umpires:
Salim Lucky (BAN)
Aziz Adimah (GHA)

1 November 2023
14:00

Zimbabwe	3–4	Nigeria
Mpofu 28'; Chomunorwa 31'; Kamusewu 43'	Report	P. John 12'; Samaila 24', 48', 59'

University of Pretoria, Pretoria
Umpires:
Aziz Adimah (GHA)
Hisham Moaaz (EGY)

1 November 2023
20:00

South Africa	11–0	Uganda
De Sousa 13'; Guise-Brown 14', 36', 53'; Ntuli 19'; Horne 24'; Mvimbi 30'; M. Cassiem 45', 49', 60'; Sherwood 58'	Report

University of Pretoria, Pretoria
Umpires:
Bryn Lowe (ZIM)
Peter Kabaso (KEN)

=== Pool B ===
Pos	Team	Pld	W	D	L	GF	GA	GD	Pts	Qualification
1	Egypt	3	3	0	0	7	1	+6	9	Semi-finals
2	Ghana	3	2	0	1	6	3	+3	6	Semi-finals
3	Kenya	3	1	0	2	2	5	−3	3	Fifth to eighth place classification
4	Zambia	3	0	0	3	2	8	−6	0	Fifth to eighth place classification

Source: FIH
Rules for classification: 1) points; 2) matches won; 3) goal difference; 4) goals for; 5) head-to-head result; 6) field goals for.

29 October 2023
12:00

Egypt	2–0	Kenya
Adel 40'; H. Ragab 55'	Report

University of Pretoria, Pretoria
Umpires:
Rawi Anbananthan (MAS)
Darren Hubach (RSA)

29 October 2023
14:00 (Note: The match was delayed due to lightning.)

Ghana	3–1	Zambia
Abdul 35'; Botsio 39'; Ankomah 41'	Report	Simpanzye 16'

University of Pretoria, Pretoria
Umpires:
Bryn Lowe (ZIM)
Stanley Tamale (UGA)

30 October 2023
10:00

Kenya	1–0	Zambia
Masibo 53'	Report

University of Pretoria, Pretoria
Umpires:
Bryn Lowe (ZIM)
Simon Awasa (NGR)

30 October 2023
12:00

Ghana	0–1	Egypt
	Report	M. Ragab 9'

University of Pretoria, Pretoria
Umpires:
Rawi Anbananthan (MAS)
Peter Kabaso (KEN)

1 November 2023
16:00

Egypt	4–1	Zambia
H. Ragab 9', 28', 58'; Mansour 34'	Report	Mpande 44'

University of Pretoria, Pretoria
Umpires:
Simon Awasa (NGR)
Stanley Tamale (UGA)

1 November 2023
18:00

Kenya	1–3	Ghana
Ludiali 4'	Report	Akaba 12', 20'; Baiden 53'

University of Pretoria, Pretoria
Umpires:
Salim Lucky (BAN)
Darren Hubach (RSA)

== Fifth to eighth place classification ==
=== Bracket ===
5–8th place semi-finals
2 November
Nigeria	5
Zambia	1
2 November
Kenya	2
Zimbabwe	1

Fifth place
4 November
Nigeria	4
Kenya	3
Seventh place
4 November
Zambia	2
Zimbabwe	0

=== 5–8th place semi-finals ===
2 November 2023
16:30

Nigeria	5–1	Zambia
Godwin 5'; Samaila 9', 55'; P. John 16'; Linus 35'	Report	Mpande 28'

University of Pretoria, Pretoria
Umpires:
Munashe Mashoko (ZIM)
Hisham Moaaz (EGY)

2 November 2023
18:45

Kenya	2–1	Zimbabwe
Masambu 22'; Kariuki 31'	Report	Chomunorwa 37'

University of Pretoria, Pretoria
Umpires:
Simon Awasa (NGR)
Aziz Adimah (GHA)

=== Seventh place game ===
4 November 2023
11:30

Zambia	2–0	Zimbabwe
Simpanzye 21'; Bwali 22'	Report

University of Pretoria, Pretoria
Umpires:
Stanley Tamale (UGA)
Simon Awasa (NGR)

=== Fifth place game ===
4 November 2023
13:45

Nigeria	4–3	Kenya
P. John 6', 35'; Samaila 52'; Ajibua 56'	Report	Onyango 21'; Omari 23'; Wabwire 56'

University of Pretoria, Pretoria
Umpires:
Bryn Lowe (ZIM)
Munashe Mashoko (ZIM)

== First to fourth place classification ==
=== Bracket ===
Semi-finals
3 November
South Africa	7
Ghana	0
3 November
Egypt	9
Uganda	1

Final
5 November
South Africa	2
Egypt	1
Third place
5 November
Ghana	7
Uganda	1

=== Semi-finals ===
3 November 2023
14:45

Egypt	9–1	Uganda
El-Ganaini 15', 26'; H. Ragab 21'; Mansour 24'; Gamal 37', 47'; Sayed 45'; Mamdouh 48'; Ghobran 50'	Report	Mugisha 57'

University of Pretoria, Pretoria
Umpires:
Peter Kabaso (KEN)
Darren Hubach (RSA)

3 November 2023
19:15

South Africa	7–0	Ghana
Julius 4'; Guise-Brown 18', 46'; Ntuli 19'; Kok 20'; M. Cassiem 50'; Van Tonder 53'	Report

University of Pretoria, Pretoria
Umpires:
Salim Lucky (BAN)
Rawi Anbananthan (MAS)

=== Third place game ===
5 November 2023
14:15

Ghana	7–1	Uganda
Tettey 9', 14', 40'; Kwofie 25'; Botsio 34'; Baiden 45'; Opoku 59'	Report	Batusa 35'

University of Pretoria, Pretoria
Umpires:
Darren Hubach (RSA)
Bryn Lowe (ZIM)

=== Final ===
5 November 2023
18:45

South Africa	2–1	Egypt
Guise-Brown 1'; Julius 51'	Report	Ghobran 3'

University of Pretoria, Pretoria
Umpires:
Salim Lucky (BAN)
Rawi Anbananthan (MAS)

== Final standings ==
Pos	Team	Qualification
1	South Africa (H)	2024 Summer Olympics
2	Egypt	2024 FIH Hockey Olympic Qualifiers
3	Ghana	
4	Uganda	
5	Nigeria	
6	Kenya	
7	Zambia	
8	Zimbabwe	

Source: FIH
(H) Host

== Goalscorers ==
There were 104 goals scored in 20 matches, for an average of 5.2 goals per match.

11 goals

- (South Africa) Matthew Guise-Brown

8 goals

- (Nigeria) James Samaila

6 goals

- (South Africa) Mustapha Cassiem
- (South Africa) Nqobile Ntuli

5 goals

- (Egypt) Hossameldin Ragab

4 goals

- (Nigeria) Peter John

3 goals

- (Ghana) Francis Tettey

2 goals

- (Egypt) Ahmed El-Ganaini
- (Egypt) Ahmed Gamal
- (Egypt) Hossam Ghobran
- (Egypt) Mostafa Mansour
- (Ghana) Elikem Akaba
- (Ghana) Michael Baiden
- (Ghana) Johnny Botsio
- (South Africa) Dayaan Cassiem
- (South Africa) Ryan Julius
- (South Africa) Tevin Kok
- (South Africa) Samkelo Mvimbi
- (South Africa) Bradley Sherwood
- (South Africa) Jacques van Tonder
- (Uganda) Colline Batusa
- (Zambia) Alfred Mpande
- (Zambia) Joseph Simpanzye
- (Zimbabwe) Alec Chomunorwa
- (Zimbabwe) Tadiwanashe Kamusewu

1 goal

- (Egypt) Ziad Adel
- (Egypt) Mahmoud Mamdouh
- (Egypt) Mostafa Ragab
- (Egypt) Amr Sayed
- (Ghana) Malik Abdul
- (Ghana) Emmanuel Ankomah
- (Ghana) Benjamin Kwofie
- (Ghana) Ernest Opoku
- (Kenya) Francis Kariuki
- (Kenya) Ivan Ludiali
- (Kenya) Bethuel Masambu
- (Kenya) Robert Masibo
- (Kenya) Cliffe Omari
- (Kenya) Festus Onyango
- (Kenya) Danstone Wabwire
- (Nigeria) Olawale Ajibua
- (Nigeria) Sunday Godwin
- (Nigeria) Kelvin Linus
- (South Africa) Keenan Horne
- (South Africa) Zenani Kraai
- (South Africa) Matthew De Sousa
- (Uganda) Maxwell Mugisha
- (Zambia) Phillimon Bwali
- (Zimbabwe) Mutsawashe Kanyangarara
- (Zimbabwe) Arnold Mpofu

Source: FIH

== See also ==
- 2023 Women's African Olympic Qualifier
- Field hockey at the 2023 African Games
