= Nigeria men's national field hockey team =

Nigeria
- Association: Nigeria Hockey Federation
- Confederation: AfHF (Africa)

FIH ranking
- Current: 34 (2 August 2026)
- Highest: 37 (2009–2010)
- Lowest: 76 (September 2019–present)

Africa Cup of Nations
- Appearances: 8 (first in 1974)
- Best result: (bronze) 3rd (2022, 2025)

African Games
- Appearances: 5 (first in 1987)
- Best result: (bronze) 3rd (1987, 2023)
Medal record
Africa Cup of Nations
| Bronze medal – third place | 2022 Accra |
| Bronze medal – third place | 2025 Ismailia |
African Games
| Bronze medal – third place | 1987 Nairobi | Team |
| Bronze medal – third place | 2023 Accra | Team |

The Nigeria men's national field hockey team represents Nigeria in international men's field hockey competitions. The team is governed by Nigeria Hockey Federation. It won the field hockey bronze at the 1987 All-Africa Games, and again the 2023 edition of these games as well as at the 2022 Africa Cup of Nations.

== Tournament history ==
=== Africa Cup of Nations ===
- 1974 – 4th place
- 1983 – 4th place
- 2000 – 5th place
- 2005 – 4th place
- 2009 – 4th place
- 2017 – 5th place
- 2022 – (bronze)
- 2025 – (bronze)

=== African Games ===
- 1987 – (bronze)
- 1991 – 5th place
- 1995 – 6th place
- 2003 – 4th place
- 2023 – (bronze)

=== African Olympic Qualifier ===
- 2007 – 5th place
- 2015 – 5th place
- 2019 – Withdrew
- 2023 – 5th place

=== Hockey World League ===
- 2012–13 – Round 1
- 2016–17 – Round 1

== See also ==
- Nigeria women's national field hockey team
