= Uganda men's national field hockey team =

Uganda
- Association: Uganda Hockey Association
- Confederation: AfHF (Africa)
- Head Coach: Vincent Kasasa; Francesco Richichi
- Manager: Byron Matovu

FIH ranking
- Current: 88 (4 October 2026)
- Highest: 44 (2007)
- Lowest: 91 (April 2021–present)

Olympic Games
- Appearances: 1 (first in 1972)
- Best result: 15th (1972)

Africa Cup of Nations
- Appearances: 3 (first in 1974)
- Best result: (bronze) 3rd (1974)
Medal record
Africa Cup of Nations
Bronze medal – third place	1974 Cairo

The Uganda men's national field hockey team represents Uganda in men's international field hockey competitions and is controlled by the Uganda Hockey Association, the governing body for field hockey in Uganda.

Uganda has participated once at the Summer Olympics in 1972 when they finished 15th.

== Tournament record ==
=== Summer Olympics ===
- 1972 – 15th

=== Africa Cup of Nations ===
- 1974 – (bronze)
- 2000 – 7th
- 2022 – 6th
- 2025 – WD

=== African Olympic Qualifier ===
- 2007 – 6th
- 2019 – Withdrew
- 2023 – 4th

== See also ==
- Uganda women's national field hockey team
