= Hockey Association of Zimbabwe =

Governing body of field hockey in Zimbabwe

- Sport: Field hockey
- Jurisdiction: Zimbabwe
- Abbreviation: HAZ
- Affiliation: FIH
- Regional affiliation: AHF
- Headquarters: Harare, Zimbabwe
- (Zimbabwe)

The Hockey Association of Zimbabwe or HAZ is the governing body of field hockey in Zimbabwe. Its headquarters are in Harare, Zimbabwe. It is affiliated to IHF International Hockey Federation and AHF African Hockey Federation.

== History ==
The Hockey Association of Zimbabwe was formed in 1925. On 19 September 2014, Mrs Virginia Ross was made an Honorary Life Member of the Hockey Association of Zimbabwe.

== See also ==
- Zimbabwe national field hockey team
- Zimbabwe women's national field hockey team at the 1980 Summer Olympics
- African Hockey Federation
