= Keenan Horne =

South African field hockey player

Personal information
- Full name: Keenan Craig Horne
- Born: 17 June 1992 (age 34) Cape Town, South Africa

Sport
- Sport: Field hockey
- Position: Forward
- Club: Central
National team
Years	Team	Caps	Goals
2013	South Africa u21	5	(0)
2015-2026	South Africa	131	(55)
Medal record
Representing South Africa
Men's field hockey
Africa Cup of Nations
Gold medal – first place	2022 Accra
Gold medal – first place	2025 Ismailia
- Updated on 2 August 2026

Keenan Craig Horne (born 17 June 1992) is a South African field hockey player who plays as a forward. He competed in the 2020 Summer Olympics.

== Personal life ==
He at graduated cum laude with a master's degree in law from Stellenbosch University.
