= Kenya Hockey Union =

Governing body of field hockey in Kenya

- Sport: Field Hockey
- Jurisdiction: Kenya
- Abbreviation: KHU
- Affiliation: FIH
- Regional affiliation: AHF
- Headquarters: City Park Hockey Stadium, Nairobi, Kenya.
- Location: 1.26061°S 36.82754°E
- President: City Park Hockey Stadium in Nairobi, Kenya.
- (Kenya)

The Kenya Hockey Union (KHU) is the governing body of field hockey in Kenya. Its headquarters are in Nairobi. It is affiliated to IHF International Hockey Federation and AHF African Hockey Federation. The Kenya Hockey Union's main venue is the City Park Hockey Stadium.

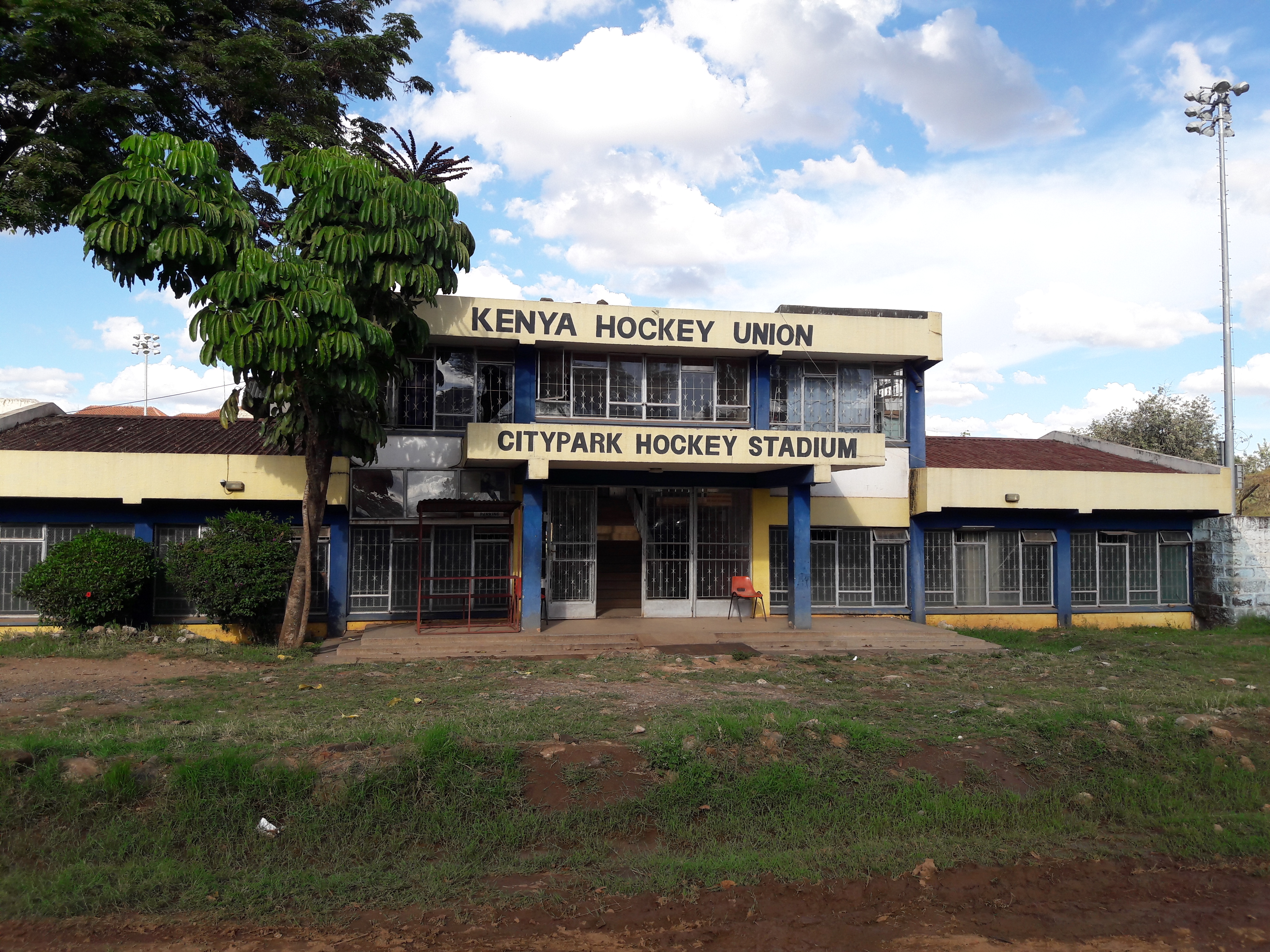
Kenya Hockey Union in Nairobi

== See also ==
- Kenya men's national field hockey team
- African Hockey Federation
