= African Hockey Federation =

Continental governing body of field hockey in Africa

- Abbreviation: AfHF
- Type: Sports federation
- Headquarters: Khumalo Hockey Stadium
- Location: Townsend Road Suburbs, Bulawayo, Zimbabwe
- Region served: Africa
- Members: 25 member associations
- President: (Egypt) Seif El Dine Ahmed
- Parent organization: International Hockey Federation
- Website: africahockey.org

African Hockey Federation (AfHF) is the continental governing body of field hockey in Africa. It is affiliated by International Hockey Federation and has 25 member nations. It bi-annually organizes Hockey African Cup for Nations, a men's and women's hockey tournament for African nations. The main objective of the organization is to make the game of hockey popular in Africa and to increase number of participants.

== Member associations ==
Highlighted are the countries that are part of the African Hockey Federation.

- Algeria
- Botswana
- Burkina Faso
- Burundi
- Cameroon
- Chad
- Egypt
- Eswatini
- The Gambia
- Ghana
- Kenya
- Libya
- Malawi
- Mauritius
- Morocco
- Namibia
- Nigeria
- Senegal
- Seychelles
- Sierra Leone
- South Africa
- Sudan
- Tanzania
- Togo
- Uganda
- Zambia
- Zimbabwe

== Competitions ==
=== National teams ===
- Hockey Africa Cup of Nations (Men & Women)
- African Games (Men & Women) in cooperation with Association of National Olympic Committees of Africa
- African Olympic Qualifier (Men & Women)
- Hockey Juniors Africa Cup of Nations (Men & Women)
- African Youth Games in cooperation with Association of National Olympic Committees of Africa
- Indoor Africa Cup (Men & Women)

=== Junior ===
- Hockey Juniors Africa Cup of Nations (Men & Women)
- Field hockey at the African Youth Games in cooperation with Association of National Olympic Committees of Africa

=== Clubs ===
- Hockey Africa Cup for Club Champions (Men & Women)

=== Title holders ===
Competition	Current	Champions	Runners-up	Next
Men's national teams
Hockey Africa Cup of Nations	2025	South Africa	Egypt	2029
Hockey African Games	2023	Egypt	Ghana	2027
African Olympic Qualifier Tournament	2023	South Africa	Egypt	TBA
Hockey Junior Africa Cup	2024	South Africa	Namibia	2027
Hockey Youth Games	2018	South Africa	Zambia	TBA
Hockey Indoor Africa Cup	2024	Namibia	South Africa	2026
Hockey5s Africa Cup of Nations	2022	Egypt	Nigeria	2027
U18 Hockey5s Youth Africa Cup	2026	Kenya	South Africa	TBA
Women's national teams
Hockey Africa Cup of Nations	2025	South Africa	Ghana	2029
Hockey African Games	2023	Ghana	Nigeria	2027
African Olympic Qualifier Tournament	2023	South Africa	Nigeria	TBA
Hockey Junior Africa Cup	2024	South Africa	Namibia	2027
Hockey Youth Games	2018	South Africa	Namibia	TBA
Hockey Indoor Africa Cup	2024	South Africa	Namibia	2026
Hockey5s Africa Cup of Nations	2022	Namibia	Zambia	2027
U18 Hockey5s Youth Africa Cup	2026	South Africa	Kenya	TBA

== National team rankings ==
Men's FIH Rankings as of 4 October 2026
AfHF	FIH	Change	Team	Points
1	13	Steady	South Africa	2531.46
2	17	▼1	Egypt	2308.99
3	33	Steady	Ghana	1722.31
4	35	Steady	Nigeria	1700.42
5	48	▲1	Kenya	1445.77
6	69	▲1	Namibia	1361.08
7	88	Steady	Uganda	1236.94
8	89	Steady	Zimbabwe	1236.73
9	90	Steady	Zambia	1214.09
10	96	Steady	Malawi	753.92
Change from 31 August 2026

Women's FIH Rankings as of 3 October 2026
AfHF	FIH	Change	Team	Points
1	18	Steady	South Africa	2050.93
2	32	Steady	Kenya	1573.85
3	33	Steady	Ghana	1570.9
4	38	▲1	Nigeria	1311.22
5	52	Steady	Namibia	1190.39
6	61	Steady	Zimbabwe	1137.77
7	65	▲1	Egypt	1111.75
8	76	Steady	Zambia	960.64
9	78	Steady	Uganda	870.43
10	79	Steady	Malawi	731.63
11	84	Steady	Eswatini	447.02
12	87	Steady	Morocco	145.66
Change from 31 August 2026

== See also ==
- International Hockey Federation
