= Egypt men's national field hockey team =

Egypt
- Association: Egyptian Hockey Federation
- Confederation: AfHF (Africa)
- Head Coach: Tahir Zaman
- Assistant coach(es): Walid Mohamed
- Manager: Mohamed Ramzy
- Captain: Amr Sayed
| Home | Away |

FIH ranking
- Current: 17 ▼1 (6 November 2026)
- Highest: 13 (2004)
- Lowest: 26 (2010)

Biggest win
- Tanzania 0–22 Egypt (Randburg, South Africa; 25 October 2015)

Biggest defeat
- Pakistan 13–0 Egypt (Lahore, Pakistan; 13 November 1976)

Olympic Games
- Appearances: 2 (first in 1992)
- Best result: 12th (1992, 2004)

Africa Cup of Nations
- Appearances: 12 (first in 1974)
- Best result: (gold) 1st (1983, 1989)

African Games
- Appearances: 6 (first in 1987)
- Best result: (gold) 1st (1991, 2003, 2023)
Medal record
| Event | 1st | 2nd | 3rd |
|---|---|---|---|
| Africa Cup of Nations | 2 | 8 | 1 |
| African Games | 3 | 2 | 0 |
| Mediterranean Games | 1 | 1 | 0 |
| Total | 6 | 11 | 1 |
Africa Cup of Nations
| Gold medal – first place | 1983 Cairo | |
| Gold medal – first place | 1989 Blantyre | |
| Silver medal – second place | 1993 Nairobi | |
| Silver medal – second place | 2000 Bulawayo | |
| Silver medal – second place | 2005 Pretoria | |
| Silver medal – second place | 2009 Accra | |
| Silver medal – second place | 2013 Nairobi | |
| Silver medal – second place | 2017 Ismailia | |
| Silver medal – second place | 2022 Accra | |
| Silver medal – second place | 2025 Ismailia | |
| Bronze medal – third place | 1996 Pretoria | |
African Games
| Gold medal – first place | 1991 Cairo | Team |
| Gold medal – first place | 2003 Abuja | Team |
| Gold medal – first place | 2023 Accra | Team |
| Silver medal – second place | 1995 Harare | Team |
| Silver medal – second place | 1999 Johannesburg | Team |
Mediterranean Games
| Gold medal – first place | 1963 Naples | Team |
| Silver medal – second place | 1955 Barcelona | Team |

The Egypt men's national field hockey team represents Egypt in international field hockey competitions. It is administered by Egyptian Hockey Federation.

== Tournament history ==
=== Summer Olympics ===
- 1992 – 12th
- 2004 – 12th

=== Africa Cup of Nations ===
- 1974 – 5th place
- 1983 – (gold)
- 1989 – (gold)
- 1993 – (silver)
- 1996 – (bronze)
- 2000 – (silver)
- 2005 – (silver)
- 2009 – (silver)
- 2013 – (silver)
- 2017 – (silver)
- 2022 – (silver)
- 2025 – (silver)

=== African Games ===
- 1987 – 4th place
- 1991 – (gold)
- 1995 – (silver)
- 1999 – (silver)
- 2003 – (gold)
- 2023 – (gold)

=== African Olympic Qualifier ===
- 2007 – (silver)
- 2011 – (silver)
- 2015 – (silver)
- 2019 – (silver)
- 2023 – (silver)

=== Hockey World League ===
- 2012–13 – 25th place
- 2014–15 – 18th place
- 2016–17 – 15th place

=== Champions Challenge ===
- 2005 – 6th place

=== Sultan Azlan Shah Cup ===
- 2009 – 5th place
- 2010 – 7th place
- 2022 – 5th place

=== Mediterranean Games ===
- 1955 – (silver)
- 1963 – (gold)
- 1979 – 5th place

=== FIH Hockey Series ===
- 2018–19 - 5th place

=== Men's FIH Hockey World Cup Qualifiers ===
- 2026 - 6th place

=== Intercontinental Cup ===
- 1989 – 9th place
- 2001 – 13th place
- 2006 – 11th place

=== Inter Nations Cup ===
- 1996 – 12th place

=== East Africa Cup ===
- 1971 – (bronze)

=== Four Nations Championship China ===
- 2007 – (bronze)

=== International Tournament Ahmedabad ===
- 1962 – 10th place

=== Afro-Asian Games ===
- 2003 - 6th place

=== FIH Hockey Nations Cup 2 ===
- 2024–25 – (silver)

=== FIH Hockey Nations Cup ===
- 2026–27 – Qualified

=== 3 Nations Tournament Egypt ===
- 2025 – (gold)

=== Men Field Hockey Africa Olympic games 1984 Qualification ===
- 1984 - (silver)

== Hockey5s Team ==
=== African Men's Hockey5s Cup of Nations ===
- 2022 – (gold)

=== Men's FIH Hockey5s World Cup ===
- 2024 - 6th place

== Results and fixtures ==
The following is a list of match results in the last 12 months, as well as any future matches that have been scheduled.

Win Draw Loss Fixture

=== 2026 ===
| 1 March 2026 WC Qualifiers GS | Egypt | 3–1 | United States | Ismailia, Egypt |
| 20:45 | El-Ganaini 10'; Atef 22'; Mohsen 52' | Report | A. Käppeler 6' | Stadium: Suez Canal Stadium |

| 2 March 2026 WC Qualifiers GS | Egypt | 0–3 | England | Ismailia, Egypt |
| 20:45 | | Report | Ward 27'; Bandurak 29'; Sorsby 57' | Stadium: Suez Canal Stadium |

| 4 March 2026 WC Qualifiers GS | Japan | 6–3 | Egypt | Ismailia, Egypt |
| 20:45 | Fujishima 7', 52', 59'; Shinohara 9'; Matsumoto 11', 40' | Report | El-Ganaini 22', 33', 34' | Stadium: Suez Canal Stadium |

| 6 March 2026 WC Qualifiers Crossover | Egypt | 4–0 | Austria | Ismailia, Egypt |
| 11:00 | El-Ganaini 9'; Awad 25'; Mamdouh 47'; Adel 53' | Report | | Stadium: Suez Canal Stadium |

| 7 March 2026 WC Qualifiers Fifth and sixth place | Egypt | 3–4 | China | Ismailia, Egypt |
| 11:00 | Adel 31'; Ragab 36'; Kamal 41' | Report | Du 44'; Su 53'; Chen Q. 56'; Ao 59' | Stadium: Suez Canal Stadium |

== Junior team ==
=== Junior World Cup ===
- 1985 – 12th Place
- 1989 – 10th Place
- 1993 – 12th Place
- 1997 – 9th Place
- 2005 – 12th Place
- 2009 – 14th Place
- 2013 – 15th Place
- 2016 – 15th Place
- 2021 – 16th Place
- 2023 – 14th Place
- 2025 – 21st Place

=== Junior Africa Hockey Cup ===
- 1984 – (gold)
- 1989 – (gold)
- 1993 – (gold)
- 1997 – (gold)
- 2001 – (silver)
- 2004 – (silver)
- 2008 – (silver)
- 2012 – (silver)
- 2016 – (gold)
- 2023 – (silver)
- 2024 – (bronze)

== See also ==
- Egypt women's national field hockey team
