= Kenya women's national field hockey team =

Kenya
- Association: Kenya Hockey Union
- Confederation: AfHF (Africa)
- Head Coach: Jacqueline Mwangi
- Assistant coach(es): Barbara Simiyu
- Manager: Glennis Namasake
- Captain: Rhoda Kuira

FIH ranking
- Current: 31 (25 July 2026)

African Games
- Appearances: 4 (first in 1995)
- Best result: (bronze) 3rd (1995, 1999, 2003, 2023)

Africa Cup of Nations
- Appearances: 6 (first in 1990)
- Best result: (silver) 2nd (1998)
Medal record
Event	1st	2nd	3rd
Africa Cup of Nations	0	1	4
African Games	0	0	4
Total	0	1	8
African Games
Bronze medal – third place	1995 Harare	Team
Bronze medal – third place	1999 Johannesburg	Team
Bronze medal – third place	2003 Abuja	Team
Bronze medal – third place	2023 Accra	Team
Africa Cup of Nations
Silver medal – second place	1998 Harare	
Bronze medal – third place	1990 Harare	
Bronze medal – third place	2013 Nairobi	
Bronze medal – third place	2022 Accra	
Bronze medal – third place	2025 Ismailia	

The Kenya women's national field hockey team represents Kenya in international field hockey competitions.

== Tournament record ==
=== African Games ===
- 1995 – (bronze)
- 1999 – (bronze)
- 2003 – (bronze)
- 2023 – (bronze)

=== Africa Cup of Nations ===
- 1990 – (bronze)
- 1998 – (silver)
- 2013 – (bronze)
- 2017 – 4th
- 2022 – (bronze)
- 2025 – (bronze)

=== African Olympic Qualifier ===
- 2007 – (silver)
- 2011 – (silver)
- 2015 – (bronze)
- 2019 – 4th place
- 2023 – (bronze)

=== Commonwealth Games ===
- 2022 – 9th

=== Hockey World League ===
- 2014–15 – 35th
- 2016–17 – Round 1

== See also ==
- Kenya men's national field hockey team
