= Kenya men's national field hockey team =

Kenya
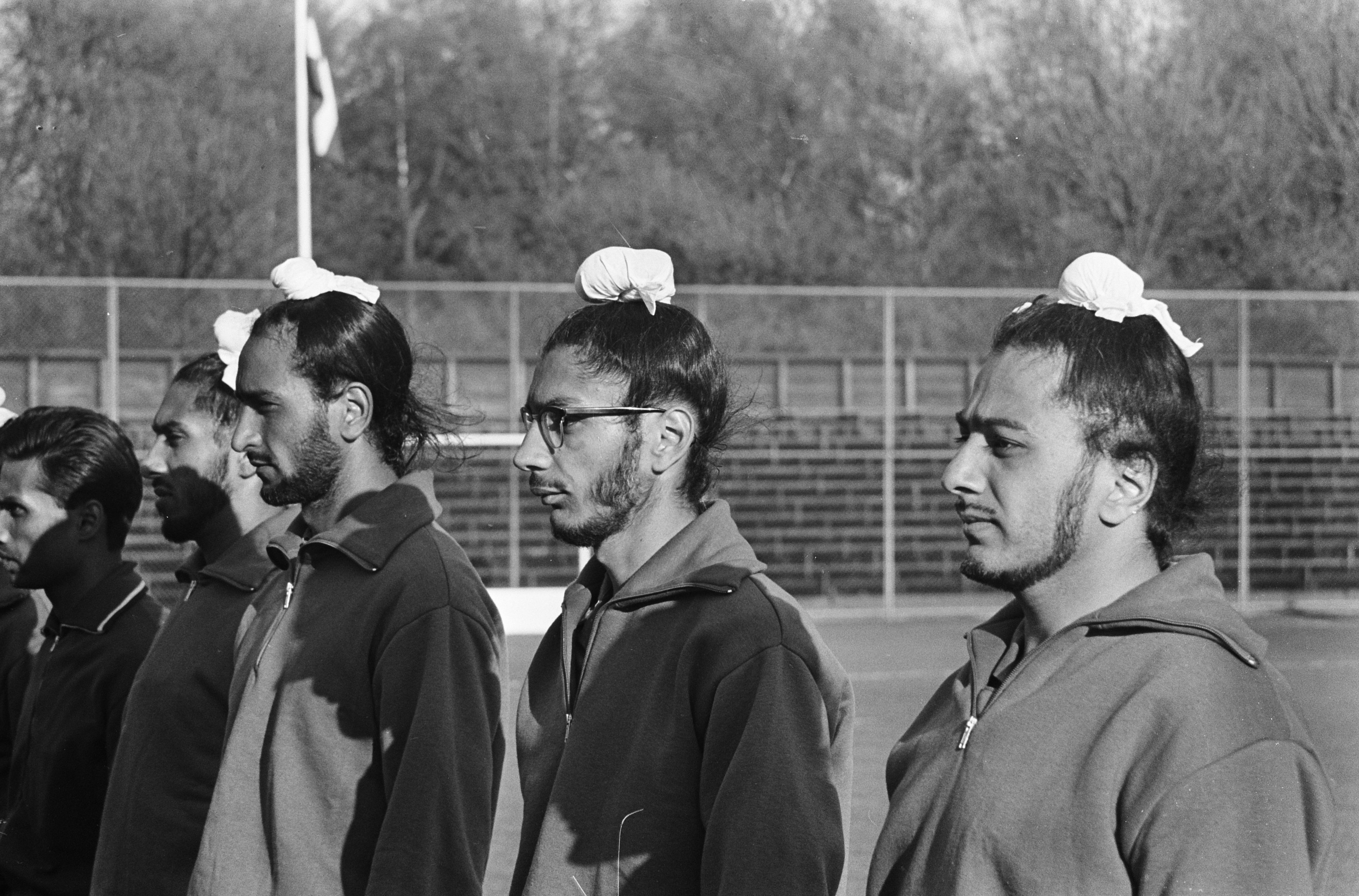
- Association: Kenya Hockey Union
- Confederation: AfHF (Africa)
- Head Coach: Fidhelis Kimanzi
- Assistant coach(es): Mike Malungu

FIH ranking
- Current: 51 (2 August 2026)
- Highest: 37 (January 2017 – July 2017)
- Lowest: 63 (2004)

Olympic Games
- Appearances: 7 (first in 1956)
- Best result: 6th (1964)

World Cup
- Appearances: 2 (first in 1971)
- Best result: 4th (1971)

Africa Cup of Nations
- Appearances: 9 (first in 1974)
- Best result: (silver) 2nd (1974, 1983, 1989, 1996)

African Games
- Appearances: 5 (first in 1987)
- Best result: (gold) 1st (1987)
Medal record
Event	1st	2nd	3rd
Africa Cup of Nations	0	4	2
African Games	1	1	2
Total	1	5	4
Africa Cup of Nations
Silver medal – second place	1974 Cairo	
Silver medal – second place	1983 Cairo	
Silver medal – second place	1989 Blantyre	
Silver medal – second place	1996 Pretoria	
Bronze medal – third place	1993 Nairobi	
Bronze medal – third place	2013 Nairobi	
African Games
Gold medal – first place	1987 Nairobi	Team
Silver medal – second place	1991 Cairo	Team
Bronze medal – third place	1995 Harare	Team
Bronze medal – third place	1999 Johannesburg	Team

The Kenya men's national field hockey team represents Kenya in men's international field hockey competitions and is controlled by the Kenya Hockey Union.

Kenya had its best Hockey World Cup result in 1971 when it finished fourth. The home venue of the team is the City Park Hockey Stadium in Nairobi.

== Tournament history ==
=== Summer Olympics ===
- 1956 – 10th place
- 1960 – 7th place
- 1964 – 6th place
- 1968 – 8th place
- 1972 – 13th place
- 1976 – Withdrew
- 1984 – 9th place
- 1988 – 12th place

=== World Cup ===
- 1971 – 4th place
- 1973 – 12th place

=== Africa Cup of Nations ===
- 1974 – (silver)
- 1983 – (silver)
- 1989 – (silver)
- 1993 – (bronze)
- 1996 – (silver)
- 2013 – (bronze)
- 2017 – 4th place
- 2022 – 4th place
- 2025 – 4th place

=== African Games ===
- 1987 – (gold)
- 1991 – (silver)
- 1995 – (bronze)
- 1999 – (bronze)
- 2023 – 4th place

=== African Olympic Qualifier ===
- 2007 – (bronze)
- 2011 – 4th place
- 2015 – (bronze)
- 2019 – 5th place
- 2023 – 6th place

=== Commonwealth Games ===
- 1998 – 11th place

== Notable players ==
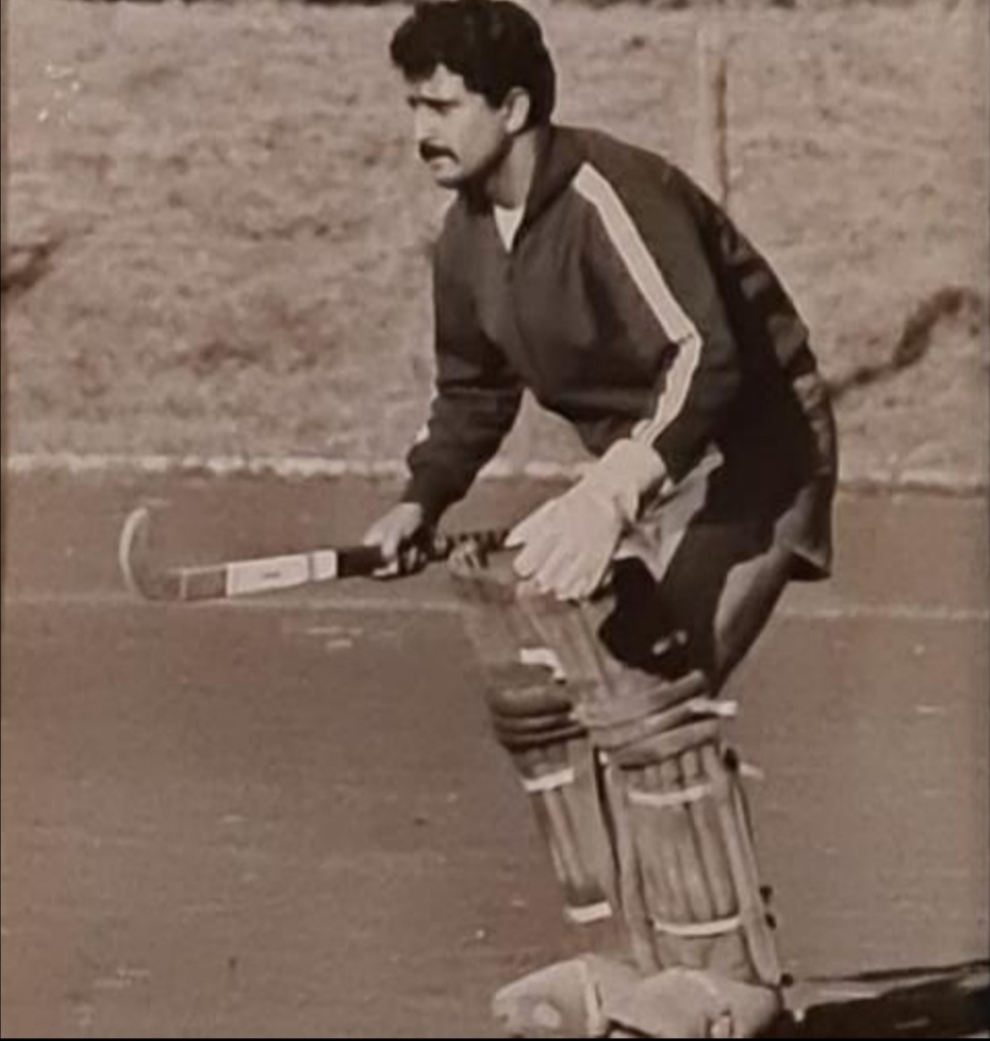
Roshan Ali, former goalkeeper of Kenya field hockey team.

- Ranjeev Deol
- Michael Omondi
- Peter Akatsa
- Chris Otambo
- Paul Omany
- Lucas Alubaha

== See also ==
- Kenya women's national field hockey team
