= Men's Hockey Africa Cup of Nations =

Field hockey tournament

- Most recent season or competition: 2025 Men's Hockey Africa Cup of Nations
- Formerly: Hockey African Cup for Nations
- Sport: Field hockey
- Founded: 1974; 52 years ago
- First season: 1974
- No. of teams: 8
- Confederation: AfHF (Africa)
- Most recent champion: South Africa (8th title) (2022)
- Most titles: South Africa (8 titles)

The Men's Hockey Africa Cup of Nations is an international men's field hockey tournament governed by African Hockey Federation. The winning team becomes the champions of Africa and qualified for the FIH Hockey World Cup.

The first edition was held in 1974.

== Qualification ==
The top two highest-ranked teams in the FIH World Rankings qualify directly for the tournament while the other teams have to play in the regional qualifiers. The top two teams from each of the regional qualifiers qualify for the tournament. The three regions are Northeast Africa, Northwest Africa, and Central south Africa.

== Results ==
Year	Host	Final			Third place match			Number of teams
Year	Host	Winner	Score	Runner-up	Third place	Score	Fourth place	Number of teams
1974; Details	Cairo, Egypt	Ghana	Round-robin	Uganda	Kenya	Round-robin	Nigeria	5
1983; Details	Cairo, Egypt	Egypt	Round-robin	Kenya	Ghana	Round-robin	Nigeria	6
1989; Details	Blantyre, Malawi	Egypt	Round-robin	Kenya	Malawi	Round-robin	Zimbabwe	5
1993; Details	Nairobi, Kenya	South Africa	Round-robin	Egypt	Kenya	Round-robin	Zimbabwe	5
1996; Details	Pretoria, South Africa	South Africa	Round-robin	Kenya	Egypt	Round-robin	Zimbabwe	6
2000; Details	Bulawayo, Zimbabwe	South Africa	3–2	Egypt	Zimbabwe	1–1	Ghana	7
2005; Details	Pretoria, South Africa	South Africa	0–0 (a.e.t.) (3–2 p.s.)	Egypt	Ghana	2–0	Nigeria	5
2009; Details	Accra, Ghana	South Africa	3–1	Egypt	Ghana	3–2 (a.e.t.)	Nigeria	4
2013; Details	Nairobi, Kenya	South Africa	2–0	Egypt	Kenya	4–1	Ghana	4
2017; Details	Ismailia, Egypt	South Africa	2–1	Egypt	Ghana	5–3	Kenya	5
2022; Details	Accra, Ghana	South Africa	1–1 (3–1 s.o.)	Egypt	Nigeria	4–2	Kenya	7
2025; Details	Ismailia, Egypt	South Africa	5–1	Egypt	Nigeria	3–1	Kenya	6

=== Performances by nation ===
Team	Titles	Runners-up	Third-place	Fourth-place
South Africa	9 (1993, 1996*, 2000, 2005*, 2009, 2013, 2017, 2022, 2025)			
Egypt	2 (1983*, 1989)	8 (1993, 2000, 2005, 2009, 2013, 2017*, 2022, 2025*)	1 (1996)	
Ghana	1 (1974)		4 (1983, 2005, 2009*, 2017)	3 (2000, 2013)
Kenya		3 (1983, 1989, 1996)	3 (1993*, 2013*, 1974)	3 (2017, 2022, 2025)
Uganda		1 (1974)		
Nigeria			2 (2022, 2025)	4 (1974, 1983, 2005, 2009)
Zimbabwe			1 (2000*)	3 (1989, 1993, 1996)
Malawi			1 (1989*)	

=== Team appearances ===
Nation	(Egypt) 1974	(Egypt) 1983	(Malawi) 1989	(Kenya) 1993	(South Africa) 1996	(Zimbabwe) 2000	(South Africa) 2005	(Ghana) 2009	(Kenya) 2013	(Egypt) 2017	(Ghana) 2022	(Egypt) 2025	Total
Botswana	–	–	–	–	6th	–	–	–	–	–	–	–	1
Egypt	5th	1st	1st	2nd	3rd	2nd	2nd	2nd	2nd	2nd	2nd	2nd	12
Ghana	1st	3rd	–	–	–	4th	3rd	3rd	4th	3rd	5th	5th	9
Kenya	2nd	2nd	2nd	3rd	2nd	–	–	–	3rd	4th	4th	4th	9
Malawi	–	–	3rd	–	–	–	–	–	–	–	–	–	1
Namibia	–	–	–	–	5th	6th	5th	–	–	–	7th	WD	4
Nigeria	4th	4th	–	–	–	5th	4th	4th	–	5th	3rd	3rd	8
Seychelles	–	–	–	5th	–	–	–	–	–	–	–	–	1
South Africa	Banned (Note: South Africa was banned from international Hockey from 1964 onwards. South Africa was allowed to take part in international competitions from 1993 onwards.)			1st	1st	1st	1st	1st	1st	1st	1st	1st	9
Tanzania	–	6th	–	–	–	–	–	–	–	–	–	–	1
Uganda	3rd	–	–	–	–	7th	–	–	–	–	6th	WD	3
Zambia	–	–	5th	–	–	–	–	–	–	WD	–	6th	2
Zimbabwe	–	5th	4th	4th	4th	3rd	–	–	–	–	WD	–	5
Total	5	6	5	5	6	7	5	4	4	5	7	6	

== See also ==
- Field hockey at the African Games
- Men's African Olympic Qualifier
- Women's Hockey Africa Cup of Nations
