= Field hockey at the 2018 African Youth Games =

Tournament held in Algiers

2018 African Youth Games
Tournament details
- Dates: 19–26 July
- Venue: Stade Ferhani

The hockey5s event at the 2018 African Youth Games in Algiers was held at the Stade Ferhani from 19 to 26 July 2018. The tournament served as a direct qualifier for the 2018 Summer Youth Olympics, with the winner and runner-up qualifying.

== Boy's tournament ==
Pool A	Pool B
South Africa; Namibia; Zimbabwe; Algeria	Zambia; Nigeria; Kenya

== Girls' tournament ==
Preliminary round
- South Africa
- Namibia
- Ghana
- Zimbabwe
- Nigeria
- Algeria

== Medal table ==
Rank	Nation	Gold	Silver	Bronze	Total
1	South Africa (RSA)	2	0	0	2
2	Namibia (NAM)	0	1	0	1
2	Zambia (ZAM)	0	1	0	1
4	Kenya (KEN)	0	0	1	1
4	Zimbabwe (ZIM)	0	0	1	1
Totals (5 entries)		2	2	2	6

=== Events ===
Event	Gold	Silver	Bronze
Boy	South Africa; Taine Bird; Jared Campbell; Mustapha Cassiem; Peter Jarvis; Matthew Lewis; Mpumelelo Maphumulo; Guy Morgan; Cody Postumus; Luke Wynford	Zambia; Robson Kunda; Simon Banda; Kennedy Siwale; Joseph Mubanga; Jeff Phiri; Phillimon Bwali; David Kapeso; Andrew Moyo; Dominic Mulenga	Kenya; Paul Ongadi; Olando Ouma; Samuel Silong; Ivan Ludiali; Edson Ndombi; Bryton Ndwati; Brian Ogenche; Robinson Omutekete; Richard Wanganga
Girl	South Africa; Jean-Leigh du Toit; Kayla de Waal; Mishka Ellis; India Hardie; Amaarah Hendricks; Jacolene McLaren; Angel Nkosi; Christa Ramasimong; Angela Welham	Namibia; Kiana-Che Cormack; Sonet Crous; Jahntwa Kruger; Danja Meyer; Taramarie Myburgh; Kaela Schimming; Cele Wessels; Carien van Rooyen; Joane van Rooyen	Zimbabwe; Munashe Dangare; Ruvimbo Dobbie; Mercedes Beekes; Simone Herbst; Mazvita Mtausi; Lilian Pope; Alexei Terblanche; Natalie Terblanche; Taya Trivella
