= Field hockey at the 2020 Summer Olympics – Women's qualification =

Twelve teams qualified for the women's field hockey at the 2020 Summer Olympics (postponed to 2021 due to the COVID-19 pandemic). Each of the Continental Champions from five confederations received an automatic berth. Japan as the host nation qualified automatically. The remaining six nations were to be determined by an Olympic qualification event. As hosts Japan also won the Asian Games title, a seventh quota place was added to the Olympic qualification event.

== Table ==
Event	Dates	Location(s)	Quota	Qualifier(s)
Host nation	—	—	1	Japan
2018 Asian Games	19 August – 1 September 2018	(Indonesia) Jakarta	–	–^{1}
2019 Pan American Games	29 July – 9 August 2019	(Peru) Lima	1	Argentina
2019 African Olympic Qualifier	12 – 18 August 2019	(South Africa) Stellenbosch	1	South Africa
2019 EuroHockey Championship	17 – 25 August 2019	(Belgium) Antwerp	1	Netherlands
2019 Oceania Cup	5 – 8 September 2019	(Australia) Rockhampton	1	New Zealand
2019 FIH Olympic Qualifiers	25 October – 3 November 2019	Various	7	Australia; China; Germany; Great Britain; India; Ireland; Spain
Total			12	

^1 – Japan qualified both as the hosts and the continental champions, therefore that quota is added to the FIH Olympic Qualifiers rather than going to the runners-up of the tournament.

== 2018 Asian Games ==
The champion of the women's field hockey tournament at the 2018 Asian Games qualifies for the Olympics. If Japan is the winner, the quota place is added to the qualification events rather than going to the runner-up.

=== Qualified teams ===
Means of qualification	Dates	Venue	Berths	Qualified
Host country	19 September 2014	(Indonesia) Jakarta	1	Indonesia
2014 Asian Games	20 September – 2 October 2014	(South Korea) Incheon	5	South Korea
2014 Asian Games	20 September – 2 October 2014	(South Korea) Incheon	5	China
2014 Asian Games	20 September – 2 October 2014	(South Korea) Incheon	5	India
2014 Asian Games	20 September – 2 October 2014	(South Korea) Incheon	5	Japan
2014 Asian Games	20 September – 2 October 2014	(South Korea) Incheon	5	Malaysia
Asian Games Qualifiers	12–20 January 2018	(Thailand) Bangkok	4	Thailand
Asian Games Qualifiers	12–20 January 2018	(Thailand) Bangkok	4	Hong Kong
Asian Games Qualifiers	12–20 January 2018	(Thailand) Bangkok	4	Chinese Taipei
Asian Games Qualifiers	12–20 January 2018	(Thailand) Bangkok	4	Kazakhstan
Total			10	

=== Preliminary round ===
==== Pool A ====
Pos	Team	Pld	W	D	L	PF	PA	PD	Pts	Qualification
1	Japan	4	4	0	0	24	3	+21	12	Semifinals
2	China	4	2	1	1	28	6	+22	7	Semifinals
3	Malaysia	4	2	1	1	22	5	+17	7	5th place game
4	Chinese Taipei	4	1	0	3	3	33	−30	3	7th place game
5	Hong Kong	4	0	0	4	2	32	−30	0	9th place game

Source: FIH
Rules for classification: 1) points; 2) goal difference; 3) goals scored; 4) head-to-head result.

==== Pool B ====
Pos	Team	Pld	W	D	L	PF	PA	PD	Pts	Qualification
1	India	4	4	0	0	38	1	+37	12	Semifinals
2	South Korea	4	3	0	1	17	4	+13	9	Semifinals
3	Thailand	4	1	0	3	3	11	−8	3	5th place game
4	Indonesia (H)	4	1	0	3	2	16	−14	3	7th place game
5	Kazakhstan	4	1	0	3	4	32	−28	3	9th place game

Source: FIH
Rules for classification: 1) points; 2) goal difference; 3) goals scored; 4) head-to-head result.
(H) Hosts

=== Final round ===
Semi-finals
29 August
Japan	2
South Korea	0
29 August
India	1
China	0

Gold medal match
31 August
Japan	2
India	1
Bronze medal match
31 August
South Korea	1
China	2

=== Final ranking ===
Rank	Team
Gold medal	Japan
Silver medal	India
Bronze medal	China
4	South Korea
5	Malaysia
6	Thailand
7	Indonesia
8	Chinese Taipei
9	Hong Kong
10	Kazakhstan

== 2019 Pan American Games ==
=== Qualified teams ===
Event	Dates	Location	Quotas	Qualified
Host Nation	—	—	1	Peru
2018 South American Games	30 May – 7 June	(Bolivia) Cochabamba	2	Argentina; Uruguay
2018 Central American and Caribbean Games	20–28 July	(Colombia) Barranquilla	2	Cuba; Mexico
2017 Women's Pan American Cup	5–13 August	(United States) Lancaster	3	Canada*; Chile (15); United States
Total			8	

- A playoff was not held, and Canada was automatically given the spot.

=== Preliminary round ===
==== Pool A ====
Pos	Team	Pld	W	D	L	GF	GA	GD	Pts	Qualification
1	Argentina	3	3	0	0	18	1	+17	9	Quarter-finals
2	Canada	3	2	0	1	15	3	+12	6	Quarter-finals
3	Uruguay	3	1	0	2	8	8	0	3	Quarter-finals
4	Cuba	3	0	0	3	2	31	−29	0	Quarter-finals

Source: FIH

==== Pool B ====
Pos	Team	Pld	W	D	L	GF	GA	GD	Pts	Qualification
1	United States	3	3	0	0	17	2	+15	9	Quarter-finals
2	Chile	3	2	0	1	17	4	+13	6	Quarter-finals
3	Mexico	3	1	0	2	4	7	−3	3	Quarter-finals
4	Peru (H)	3	0	0	3	0	25	−25	0	Quarter-finals

Source: FIH
(H) Hosts

=== Classification round ===
Quarter-finals
4 August
Argentina	21
Peru	0
4 August
Uruguay	0
Chile	5
4 August
Canada	9
Mexico	0
4 August
Cuba	0
United States	9

Semi-finals
6 August
Argentina	3
Chile	1
6 August
Canada	2
United States	0

Gold medal match
9 August
Argentina	5
Canada	1
Bronze medal match
9 August
Chile	1
United States	5

== 2019 African Olympic Qualifier ==
=== Teams ===
The following seven teams, shown with pre-tournament FIH World Rankings, were expected to participate in the tournament. Nigeria and Uganda withdrew before the tournament.

- Ghana (32)
- Kenya (45)
- Namibia (40)
- ~~Nigeria~~ (47)
- South Africa (16)
- ~~Uganda~~ (–)
- Zimbabwe (66)

=== Pool ===
Pos	Team	Pld	W	D	L	GF	GA	GD	Pts	Qualification
1	South Africa (H)	4	4	0	0	16	0	+16	12	2020 Summer Olympics
2	Ghana	4	2	1	1	7	8	−1	7	
3	Zimbabwe	4	2	0	2	6	7	−1	6	
4	Kenya	4	1	1	2	2	6	−4	4	
5	Namibia	4	0	0	4	2	12	−10	0	

Source: FIH
Rules for classification: 1) points; 2) matches won; 3) goal difference; 4) goals for; 5) head-to-head result; 6) field goals scored.
(H) Hosts

== 2019 EuroHockey Championship ==
=== Qualified teams ===
The following teams, shown with pre-tournament world rankings, participated in the 2019 EuroHockey Championship.

Dates	Event	Location	Quotas	Qualifier(s)
15 June 2016	Host		1	Belgium (9)
18–26 August 2017	2017 EuroHockey Championship	Amstelveen, Netherlands	5	Netherlands (1); England (4); Germany (5); Spain (7); Ireland (8)
6–12 August 2017	2017 EuroHockey Championship II	Cardiff, Wales	2	Belarus (22); Russia (23)
Total			8	

=== Preliminary round ===
==== Pool A ====
Pos	Team	Pld	W	D	L	GF	GA	GD	Pts	Qualification
1	Spain	3	2	1	0	3	1	+2	7	Semi-finals
2	Netherlands	3	1	2	0	16	2	+14	5	Semi-finals
3	Belgium (H)	3	1	1	1	5	3	+2	4	Pool C
4	Russia	3	0	0	3	1	19	−18	0	Pool C

Source: FIH
Rules for classification: 1) points; 2) matches won; 3) goal difference; 4) goals for; 5) head-to-head result; 6) field goals for.
(H) Hosts

==== Pool B ====
Pos	Team	Pld	W	D	L	GF	GA	GD	Pts	Qualification
1	England	3	2	1	0	7	5	+2	7	Semi-finals
2	Germany	3	1	2	0	15	2	+13	5	Semi-finals
3	Ireland	3	1	1	1	13	3	+10	4	Pool C
4	Belarus	3	0	0	3	3	28	−25	0	Pool C

Source: FIH
Rules for classification: 1) points; 2) matches won; 3) goal difference; 4) goals for; 5) head-to-head result; 6) field goals for.

=== Final round ===
Semi-finals
23 August
Spain	2
Germany	3
23 August
England	0
Netherlands	8

Final
25 August
Germany	0
Netherlands	2
Third place
25 August
Spain (p.s.o.)	1 (3)
England	1 (2)

=== Final ranking ===
Pos	Team	Pld	W	D	L	GF	GA	GD	Pts	Status
1st place, gold medalist(s)	Netherlands	5	3	2	0	26	2	+24	11	Qualified for 2020 Summer Olympics
2nd place, silver medalist(s)	Germany	5	2	2	1	18	6	+12	8	
3rd place, bronze medalist(s)	Spain	5	2	2	1	6	5	+1	8	
4	England	5	2	2	1	8	14	−6	8	
5	Ireland	5	3	1	1	18	6	+12	10	
6	Belgium	5	2	1	2	9	6	+3	7	
7	Russia	5	1	0	4	8	22	−14	3	Relegated to EuroHockey Championship II
8	Belarus	5	0	0	5	4	36	−32	0	Relegated to EuroHockey Championship II

Source: FIH

== 2019 Oceania Cup ==
=== Pool ===
Pos	Team	Pld	W	D	L	GF	GA	GD	Pts	Qualification
1st place, gold medalist(s)	New Zealand	3	1	1	1	6	5	+1	4	2020 Summer Olympics
2nd place, silver medalist(s)	Australia (H)	3	1	1	1	5	6	−1	4	

Source: FIH
Rules for classification: 1) points; 2) goal difference; 3) goals scored; 4) head-to-head result.
(H) Hosts

== Olympic qualifying events ==
Originally, twelve teams were to take part in the Olympic Qualifiers. These teams were to be drawn into six pairs; each pair playing a two-match, aggregate score series. The winner of each series qualified for the Olympics. As Japan won the 2018 Asian Games (thereby qualifying twice, once as host and once as Asian champions), there were 14 teams, seven of whom qualified.

=== Qualification ===
The participating teams were confirmed on 29 August 2019 by the International Hockey Federation.

Dates	Event(s)	Location	Quota	Qualifier(s)
26 January – 29 June 2019	2019 FIH Pro League		2 (Note: As two of the four FIH Pro League qualifiers had already qualified for the Olympics through their confederation's tournaments, the two FIH Pro League qualifying spots were added to the (originally four) FIH World Rankings quota.)	~~Argentina~~ (Note: Argentina, the Netherlands, and New Zealand already qualified directly for the 2020 Summer Olympics by winning their continental championships, so they were replaced by the highest ranked teams not already qualified.); Australia; Germany; ~~Netherlands~~
8–16 June 2019	2018–19 FIH Series Finals	(Northern Ireland) Banbridge	2	Ireland; South Korea
15–23 June 2019	2018–19 FIH Series Finals	(Japan) Hiroshima	1	India; ~~Japan~~ (Note: Japan finished in the top two and cannot qualify for the Olympic Qualifiers because they are already qualified for the 2020 Summer Olympics, the team that finished third does not automatically qualify for the FIH Olympic qualifiers. Any such additional place is determined by the FIH World Rankings as at the completion of the continental championships.)
19–27 June 2019	2018–19 FIH Series Finals	(Spain) Valencia	2	Canada; Spain
8 September 2019	FIH World Rankings		7	Belgium; Chile; China; Great Britain; Italy; ~~New Zealand~~; Russia; United States
Total			14	

=== Matches ===
Team 1	Agg.	Team 2	1st leg	2nd leg
Australia	9–2	Russia	4–2	5–0
China	2–2 (2–1 p.s.o.)	Belgium	0–2	2–0
Spain	4–1	South Korea	2–1	2–0
India	6–5	United States	5–1	1–4
Germany	9–0	Italy	2–0	7–0
Great Britain	5–1	Chile	3–0	2–1
Ireland	0–0 (4–3 p.s.o.)	Canada	0–0	0–0

== See also ==
- Field hockey at the 2020 Summer Olympics – Men's qualification
