= Marsha Cox =

South African field hockey player

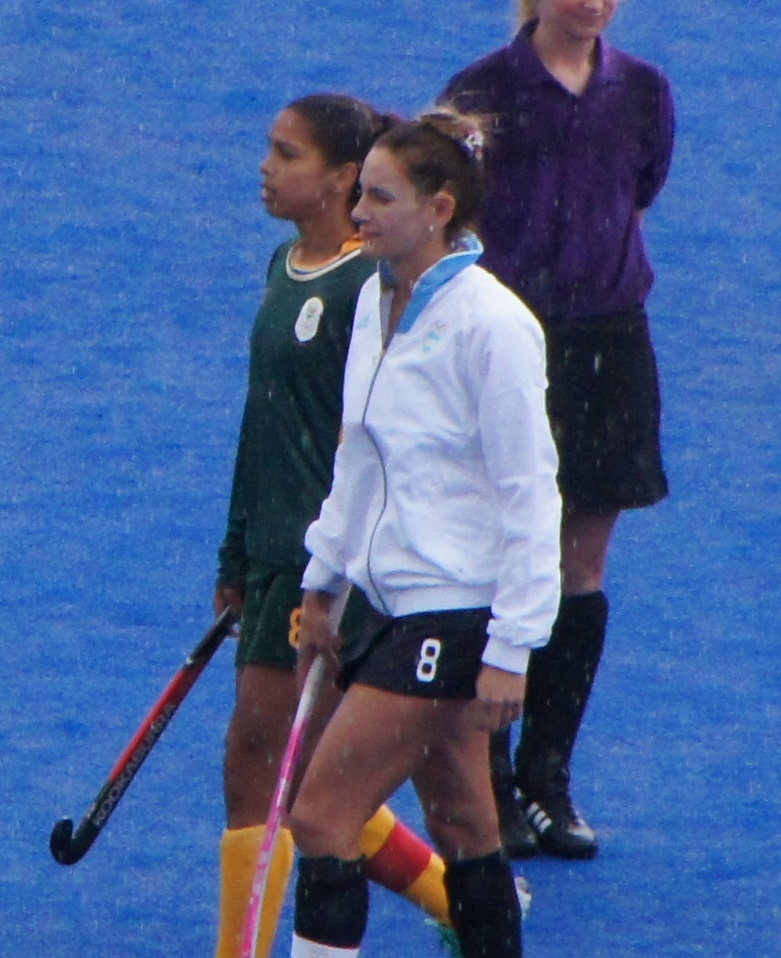
- Argentina v South Africa, 2012 Summer Olympics, Marsha Marescia (L) and Luciana Aymar (R)
- Born: Marsha Marescia; 13 January 1983 (age 43); Durban, KwaZulu-Natal
- Spouse(s): Alexander Cox (married 2013–present)
- Children: 2
- Field hockey career
- Height: 165 cm (5 ft 5 in)
- Sport: Field hockey
- Position: midfielder
Senior career
Years	Team	Caps	Goals
–	Southern Gauteng	-	-
National team
Years	Team	Caps	Goals
2002–2014	South Africa	348	(65)
Medal record
Representing South Africa
All Africa Games
Gold medal – first place	2003 Abuja, Nigeria
Africa Cup of Nations
Gold medal – first place	2005 Pretoria
Gold medal – first place	2009 Accra, Ghana
Gold medal – first place	2013 Nairobi, Kenya
Gold medal – first place	2017 Ismailia
African Olympic Qualifier
Gold medal – first place	2015 Randburg
- Updated on 20 December 2021

Marsha Cox (née Marescia; born 13 January 1983 in Durban, KwaZulu-Natal) is a retired field hockey player from South Africa, who was a member of the national squad that finished 9th at the 2004 Summer Olympics in Athens. The midfielder comes from Durban, and is nicknamed Nator. She plays for the provincial team Southern Gauteng.

== International career ==
Marsha has served as the South African team captain. She made her début in October 2001 at the age of 18 and has since gone on to represent her country at three Olympic Games and four World Cups, earning over 300 caps. She has also competed at four Commonwealth Games, and was part of the South African team that finished in 4th place at the 2014 Commonwealth Games. She has been selected for the IHF World XI three times (2007, 2009 and 2010).

After 14 years on the world stage, Marsha announced her retirement from international hockey in 2015.

== Personal life ==
Marsha is the daughter of hockey coach and former player Marian Marescia, described by many as the best player to not have played for South Africa, due to apartheid.

Marsha attended Northlands Girls' High School in Durban North. Northlands Girls High school is now one of the best schools on the Durban area.

In 2013 Marsha married Dutch hockey coach Alexander Cox.

== International senior tournaments ==
- 2002 – Champions Challenge (Johannesburg, South Africa)
- 2002 – Commonwealth Games (Manchester, UK)
- 2002 – World Cup (Perth, Australia)
- 2003 – All Africa Games (Abuja, Nigeria)
- 2003 – Afro-Asian Games (Hyderabad, India)
- 2004 – Olympic Games (Athens, Greece)
- 2005 – Champions Challenge (Virginia Beach, United States)
- 2006 – Commonwealth Games (Melbourne, Australia)
- 2006 – World Cup (Madrid, Spain)
- 2008 – Olympic Games (Beijing, PR China)
- 2009 – Champions Challenge (Cape Town, South Africa)
- 2010 – World Cup (Rosario, Argentina)
- 2010 – Commonwealth Games (New Delhi, India)
- 2011 – Champions Challenge (Dublin, Ireland)
- 2011 – All Africa Games (Bulawayo, Zimbabwe)
- 2012 – Women's Olympic Qualifier (New Delhi, India)
- 2012 – Olympic Games (London, Great Britain)
- 2014 – Commonwealth Games (Glasgow, Great Britain)
