= 2022 Women's Varsity Hockey (South Africa) =

Tournament details
- Dates: 5 October 2022–6 October 2022
- Venue: University of Pretoria

Final positions
- Champions: Tuks
- Runner-up: Maties
- Third place: NWU

Tournament statistics
- Matches played: 4
- Goals scored: 22 (5.5 per match)
- Top scorer: Rebecca Kaps (Maties) (4 goals)
- Best player: Ongeziwe Mali (Maties)

The 2022 Women's Hockey Varsity Hockey will be the 10th edition of the Varsity Hockey, the annual tournament women's field hockey championship of South Africa.

In addition to the Power Play rule seen in previous seasons of Varsity Hockey, whereby each team can select to implement a two-minute period where goals count two and the opposition must bench two players, field goals will now count two.

== Results ==
=== Fixtures ===
5 October 2022
13:00

Tuks	0–0	Kovsies
	Report
Penalties
(penalty shoot-out scored) Zulu; (penalty shoot-out missed) Fitzhenry; (penalty shoot-out scored) Fourie; (penalty shoot-out scored) Steenkamp	3–1	Ontong (penalty shoot-out scored); Marais (penalty shoot-out missed); Shindre-Lee (penalty shoot-out missed); (penalty shoot-out missed) April

5 October 2022
15:00

NWU	1–8	Maties
van Biljon 22'	Report	Mali 15'; Maree 52' de Waal 57'; Kaps 59'

=== 3 & 4 ===
6 October 2022
11:00

Kovsies	0–6	NWU
	Report	Adams 29'; Ramasimong 46'; Kock 51'; McLaren 58'

=== Final ===
6 October 2022
15:00

Maties	3–4	Tuks
Kaps 18' le Roux 40'	Report	Mzimela 2'; Fourie 59'

== Final standings ==
Pos	Team
1st place, gold medalist(s)	Tuks (H)
2nd place, silver medalist(s)	Maties
3rd place, bronze medalist(s)	NWU
4	Kovsie

Source: SA Hockey
(H) Host

== Goalscorers ==
There were 22 goals scored in 4 matches, for an average of 5.5 goals per match.

4 goals

- Rebecca Kaps (Maties)

2 goals

- Tamlyn Kock (NWU)
- Jacolene McLaren (NWU)
- Ongeziwe Mali (Maties)
- Caylin Maree (Maties)
- Kayla de Waal (Maties)
- Tegan Fourie (Tuks)
- Bulelwa Mzimela (Tuks)

1 goal

- Kirsty Adams (NWU)
- Christa Ramasimong (NWU)
- Jana van Biljon (NWU)
- Mikkela le Roux (Maties)

Source: SAHA
