= Shelley Russell =

South African field hockey player

Shelley Jones
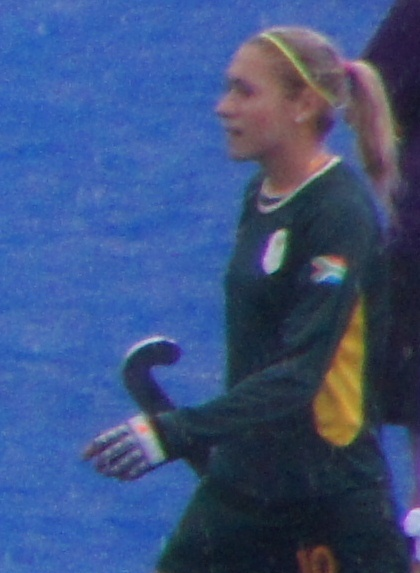
- Born: Shelley Russell; 15 July 1987 (age 39); Sandton, South Africa
- Relatives: Brent Russell (brother)
- Field hockey career
- Height: 1.64 m (5 ft 5 in)
- Weight: 62 kg (137 lb)
- Sport: Field hockey
- Position: Forward
National team
Years	Team	Caps	Goals
2006–2018	South Africa	276	(24)
Medal record
Africa Cup of Nations
Gold medal – first place	2013 Nairobi

Shelley Jones (née Russell, born 15 July 1987) is a South African field hockey player who competed in the 2008 and 2012 Summer Olympics. She was also part of the 2014 Commonwealth Games team that reached the bronze medal match.

Her brother Brent was South Africa rugby union international.
