= Field hockey at the 2000 Commonwealth Youth Games =

Field Hockey at the I Commonwealth Youth Games
- Dates: 10 – 14 August
- Host city: Edinburgh, Scotland
- Venue: Peffermill National Hockey Centre
- Events: 1
- Participation: 60 athletes from 4 nations

At the 2000 Commonwealth Youth Games, the Field Hockey events were held at the Peffermill National Hockey Centre in Edinburgh, Scotland from 10 to 14 August. The competition was fought on a league format involving four teams playing a round robin. Final league positions decided the medals. For these games, only a female championship took place.

== Results ==
=== Standings ===
Team	Pts	Pld	W	D	L	GF	GA
1. Australia (AUS)	9	3	3	0	0	14	1
2. South Africa (SAF)	4	3	1	1	1	7	4
3. Scotland (SCO)	4	3	1	1	1	5	8
4. Canada (CAN)	0	3	0	0	3	2	15

=== Fixtures ===
10 August 2000

Scotland	5–2	Canada
Bunce; Carroll; Hislop; MacRae		Roberts

Edinburgh Peffermill National Hockey Centre
10 August 2000

Australia	4–1	South Africa
Sanders; Cibich; Pritchard		Hamman

Edinburgh Peffermill National Hockey Centre

11 August 2000

Scotland	0–0	South Africa

Edinburgh Peffermill National Hockey Centre
11 August 2000

Australia	4–0	Canada
Sanders; Pritchard; Patrick

Edinburgh Peffermill National Hockey Centre

12 August 2000

Scotland	0–6	Australia
		Howlett; Sanders; Morgan; Commens

Edinburgh Peffermill National Hockey Centre
12 August 2000

South Africa	6-0	Canada
Hamman; De Kock; Marescia; Kleet

Edinburgh Peffermill National Hockey Centre

== Squads ==
Participating teams and rosters
Scotland	Australia	South Africa	Canada
Vikki Bunce; Louise Carroll	Renee Allen; Danette Boland; Kirsten Bremner; Meg Buchanan; Jessica Cibich; Sarah Commens; Jenny Gosper; Jane Howlett; Kate Hubble; Jane Morgan; Donna-Lee Patrick; Hayley Phipps; Rebecca Pokarier; Nadia Pritchard; Rebecca Sanders; Emma van Dyk	Marsha Marescia	Sarah Duggan; Larine Fell; Amanda Guttormson; Chelsea Haines; Bronwen Kelly; Stephanie Maxwell; Jennifer Melynk; Stefanie Mendonça; Krista Moffett; Elise Roberts; Leigh Sandison; Lucy Shaw; Suzanne Simpson; Cristin Tollefson; Natalie Ward; Hayley Wickman
