= Bernadette Coston =

South African field hockey player

Personal information
- Born: 17 August 1989 (age 36) Johannesburg

Sport
- Sport: Field hockey
- Club: Jozi Warriors
National team
Years	Team	Caps	Goals
2012-2023	South Africa	155	(18)
Medal record
Africa Cup of Nations
Gold medal – first place	2013 Nairobi
Gold medal – first place	2022 Accra

Bernadette Coston (born 17 August 1989, Johannesburg) is a South African field hockey player. At the 2012 Summer Olympics she competed with the South Africa women's national field hockey team in the women's tournament. She was also part of the South African women's team at the 2014 Commonwealth Games.

She completed her master's degree in chiropractic and graduated from the University of Johannesburg in 2016.

She has announced her retirement from International Hockey.
