= Marlise van Tonder =

South African field hockey player

Personal information
- Born: 5 June 1997 (age 29)
- Height: 1.66 m (5 ft 5 in)
- Weight: 64 kg (141 lb)

Sport
- Sport: Field hockey
- Position: Goalkeeper
- Club: WPCC beavers
National team
Years	Team	Caps	Goals
2016–	South Africa	28	(0)
2016	South Africa U21	10	(0)
Medal record
Women's field hockey
Representing South Africa
Africa Cup of Nations
Gold medal – first place	2025 Ismailia

Marlise van Tonder (born 5 June 1997) is a South African field hockey player for the South African national team.

She participated at the 2018 Women's Hockey World Cup.
