= Namibia national field hockey team =

Namibia national field hockey team may refer to:

- Namibia men's national field hockey team
- Namibia women's national field hockey team
