= Tanzania women's national field hockey team =

Women's field hockey team from Tanzania

Tanzania
- Association: Tanzania Hockey Association
- Confederation: AfHF (Africa)

FIH ranking
- Current: NR (3 October 2026)

Africa Cup of Nations
- Appearances: 1 (first in 2013)
- Best result: 4th (2013)

The Tanzania women's national field hockey team represent Tanzania in women's international competitions and is controlled by the Tanzania Hockey Association, the governing body for field hockey in Uganda.

They have participated once in the Africa Cup of Nations in 2013 when they finished fourth.

== Tournament record ==
=== Africa Cup of Nations ===
- 2013 – 4th

=== African Olympic Qualifier ===
- 2015 – 7th

=== Hockey World League ===
- 2014–15 – Round 1

== See also ==
- Tanzania men's national field hockey team
