= Alexander Cox (field hockey) =

Dutch field hockey coach

- Born: 10 January 1978 (age 48); Zeist, Netherlands
- Spouse(s): Marsha Cox (married 2013–present)
- Children: 2
- Field hockey career
- Sport: Field hockey
- Position: Defender
- Club: Amsterdam (coach)
Senior career
Years	Team	Caps	Goals
–2003	Schaerweijde	-	-
2003–2006	SCHC	-	-
Coaching career
- 2006–2008: Schaerweijde
- 2008: HGC
- 2009–2011: Laren (women)
- 2012–2020: Kampong
- 2017: → Netherlands U21
- 2018–2019: → Ireland
- 2021–present: Amsterdam

Alexander Cox, also known as Alex Cox, is a Dutch field hockey coach and a former field hockey player. He guided SV Kampong to the 2015–16 Euro Hockey League title and two successive Hoofdklasse titles in 2016–17 and 2017–18. He has also worked as an assistant coach with both the Netherlands men's and Netherlands women's teams. He was head coach of the Netherlands U21 team that won the 2017 Men's EuroHockey Junior Championship. Between 2018 and 2019, Cox served as head coach of the Ireland men. He is married to Marsha Marescia, the former South Africa women's international.

== Playing career ==
Cox played as a defender with Schaerweijde. Between 2003 and 2006 he played for SCHC in the Hoofdklasse.

== Coaching career ==
=== Early years ===
Between 2006 and 2008 Cox the men's coach at Schaerweijde. In 2008 he took over from Paul van Ass at HGC in the Hoofdklasse. Between 2009 and 2011 he coached the Laren women's team in the Women's Hoofdklasse.

=== Netherlands ===
Cox worked as an assistant coach with both the Netherlands men's and Netherlands women's teams at the 2012 Summer Olympics when they won silver and gold medals respectively. He was head coach of the Netherlands U21 team that won the 2017 Men's EuroHockey Junior Championship.

=== SV Kampong ===
In 2012 Cox was appointed head coach of the men's team at SV Kampong. With a team that included David Harte, he subsequently guided SV Kampong to the 2015–16 Euro Hockey League title and two successive Hoofdklasse titles in 2016–17 and 2017–18. In January 2020 he announced he would quit coaching at the end of the 2019–20 season to focus on his social life.

=== Ireland ===
In July 2018 Cox was appointed head coach of Ireland. He subsequently took charge of the Ireland team at the 2018 Men's Hockey World Cup and at the 2019 Men's EuroHockey Nations Championship. In August 2019 he resigned as Ireland head coach.

Tournaments as Head Coach	Place	Team
2017 Men's EuroHockey Junior Championship	1st	Netherlands U21
2018 Men's Four Nations Cup	4th	Ireland
2018 Men's Hockey World Cup	14th	Ireland
2018–19 Men's FIH Series Finals	2nd	Ireland
2019 Men's EuroHockey Nations Championship	8th	Ireland

== Personal life ==
In January 2013 Cox married Marsha Marescia, the former South Africa women's international and SV Kampong player.

== Honours ==
=== Coach ===
SV Kampong

- Euro Hockey League
  - Winners: 2015–16
  - Runners up: 2017–18
- Hoofdklasse
  - Winners: 2016–17, 2017–18
  - Runners up: 2014–15, 2018–19

Netherlands U21

- EuroHockey Junior Championship
  - Winners: 2017

Ireland

- Men's FIH Series Finals
  - Runners up: 2019 Le Touquet
