= Field hockey at the 2020 Summer Olympics – Men's qualification =

Twelve teams qualified for the men's field hockey at the 2020 Summer Olympics (postponed to 2021 due to the COVID-19 pandemic).

== Table ==
Event	Dates	Location(s)	Quota	Qualifier(s)
Host nation	—	—	1	Japan
2018 Asian Games	19 August – 1 September 2018	(Indonesia) Jakarta	–	–^{A}
2019 Pan American Games	30 July – 10 August 2019	(Peru) Lima	1	Argentina
2019 African Olympic Qualifier	12 – 18 August 2019	(South Africa) Stellenbosch	1	South Africa
2019 EuroHockey Championship	16 – 24 August 2019	(Belgium) Antwerp	1	Belgium
2019 Oceania Cup	5 – 8 September 2019	(Australia) Rockhampton	1	Australia
2019 FIH Olympic Qualifiers	25 October – 3 November 2019	Various	7	Canada; Germany; Great Britain; India; Netherlands; New Zealand; Spain
Total			12	

^A – Japan qualified both as the hosts and the continental champions, therefore that quota is added to the FIH Olympic Qualifiers rather than going to the runners-up of the tournament.

== 2018 Asian Games ==
The champion of the men's field hockey tournament at the 2018 Asian Games qualifies for the Olympics. If Japan is the winner, the quota place is added to the qualification events rather than going to the runner-up.

=== Qualified teams ===
Event	Dates	Location	Quotas	Qualifier(s)
Host	19 September 2014	(South Korea) Incheon	1	Indonesia
Qualified automatically via 2014 Asian Games	20 September – 2 October 2014	(South Korea) Incheon	5	India; Pakistan; South Korea; Malaysia; ~~China~~; Japan
Asian Games Qualifiers	8–17 March 2018	(Oman) Muscat	4	Oman; Bangladesh; Sri Lanka; Thailand; ~~Chinese Taipei~~
Reallocation	—	—	2	Kazakhstan; Hong Kong
Total			12	

=== Preliminary round ===
==== Pool A ====
Pos	Team	Pld	W	D	L	PF	PA	PD	Pts	Qualification
1	India	5	5	0	0	76	3	+73	15	Semi-finals
2	Japan	5	4	0	1	30	11	+19	12	Semi-finals
3	South Korea	5	3	0	2	39	8	+31	9	Fifth place game
4	Sri Lanka	5	2	0	3	7	41	−34	6	Seventh place game
5	Indonesia (H)	5	1	0	4	5	40	−35	3	Ninth place game
6	Hong Kong	5	0	0	5	3	57	−54	0	Eleventh place game

Source: FIH
Rules for classification: 1) points; 2) goal difference; 3) goals scored; 4) head-to-head result.
(H) Hosts

==== Pool B ====
Pos	Team	Pld	W	D	L	PF	PA	PD	Pts	Qualification
1	Pakistan	5	5	0	0	45	1	+44	15	Semi-finals
2	Malaysia	5	4	0	1	41	6	+35	12	Semi-finals
3	Bangladesh	5	3	0	2	11	15	−4	9	Fifth place game
4	Oman	5	2	0	3	7	19	−12	6	Seventh place game
5	Thailand	5	1	0	4	4	27	−23	3	Ninth place game
6	Kazakhstan	5	0	0	5	5	45	−40	0	Eleventh place game

Source: FIH
Rules for classification: 1) points; 2) goal difference; 3) goals scored; 4) head-to-head result.

=== Final round ===
Semi-finals
30 August
India	2 (6)
Malaysia (p.s.o.)	2 (7)
30 August
Pakistan	0
Japan	1

Gold medal match
1 September
Malaysia	6 (1)
Japan (p.s.o.)	6 (3)
Bronze medal match
1 September
India	2
Pakistan	1

=== Final standings ===
Rank	Team
Gold medal	Japan
Silver medal	Malaysia
Bronze medal	India
4	Pakistan
5	South Korea
6	Bangladesh
7	Oman
8	Sri Lanka
9	Thailand
10	Indonesia
11	Kazakhstan
12	Hong Kong

Qualified for the 2020 Summer Olympics as hosts

== 2019 Pan American Games ==
=== Qualified teams ===
Event	Dates	Location	Quotas	Qualified
Host Nation	—	—	1	Peru
2018 South American Games	29 May – 6 June	(Bolivia) Cochabamba	2	Argentina; Chile
2018 Central American and Caribbean Games	21–29 July	(Colombia) Barranquilla	2	Cuba; Mexico
2017 Men's Pan American Cup	4–12 August	(United States) Lancaster	3	Canada; United States; Trinidad and Tobago
Total			8	

- A playoff was not necessary, as Canada and the United States were the top two teams not qualified from the 2017 Men's Pan American Cup.

=== Preliminary round ===
==== Pool A ====
Pos	Team	Pld	W	D	L	GF	GA	GD	Pts	Qualification
1	Argentina	3	3	0	0	20	1	+19	9	Quarter-finals
2	Chile	3	2	0	1	7	5	+2	6	Quarter-finals
3	Cuba	3	1	0	2	3	15	−12	3	Quarter-finals
4	Trinidad and Tobago	3	0	0	3	2	11	−9	0	Quarter-finals

Source: FIH

==== Pool B ====
Pos	Team	Pld	W	D	L	GF	GA	GD	Pts	Qualification
1	Canada	3	3	0	0	23	2	+21	9	Quarter-finals
2	United States	3	2	0	1	21	5	+16	6	Quarter-finals
3	Mexico	3	1	0	2	10	12	−2	3	Quarter-finals
4	Peru (H)	3	0	0	3	3	38	−35	0	Quarter-finals

Source: FIH
(H) Hosts

=== Classification round ===
Quarter-finals
5 August
Argentina	14
Peru	1
5 August
Cuba	1
United States	5
5 August
Chile	2
Mexico	0
5 August
Trinidad and Tobago	1
Canada	5

Semi-finals
8 August
Argentina	5
United States	0
8 August
Chile	2
Canada	3

Gold medal match
10 August
Argentina	5
Canada	2
Bronze medal match
10 August
United States	2
Chile	1

=== Final standings ===
Pos	Team	Qualification
1	Argentina	2020 Summer Olympics
2	Canada	
3	United States	
4	Chile	
5	Trinidad and Tobago	
6	Cuba	
7	Mexico	
8	Peru (H)	

Source: FIH
(H) Host

== 2019 African Olympic Qualifier ==
=== Teams ===
The following eight teams, shown with pre-tournament FIH World Rankings, were expected to participate in the tournament. Nigeria and Uganda withdrew before the tournament.

- Egypt (20)
- Ghana (36)
- Kenya (48)
- Namibia (68)
- ~~Nigeria~~ (57)
- South Africa (14)
- ~~Uganda~~ (–)
- Zimbabwe (61)

=== Pool ===
Pos	Team	Pld	W	D	L	GF	GA	GD	Pts	Qualification
1	South Africa (H)	5	5	0	0	28	4	+24	15	2020 Summer Olympics
2	Egypt	5	4	0	1	24	7	+17	12	
3	Ghana	5	3	0	2	12	18	−6	9	
4	Zimbabwe	5	1	1	3	8	23	−15	4	
5	Kenya	5	1	0	4	9	18	−9	3	
6	Namibia	5	0	1	4	6	17	−11	1	

Source: FIH
Rules for classification: 1) points; 2) matches won; 3) goal difference; 4) goals for; 5) head-to-head result; 6) field goals scored.
(H) Hosts

== 2019 EuroHockey Championship ==
=== Qualified teams ===
The following teams, shown with pre-tournament world rankings, participated in the 2019 EuroHockey Championship.

Dates	Event	Location	Quotas	Qualifier(s)
15 June 2016	Host		1	Belgium (2)
19–27 August 2017	2017 EuroHockey Championship	Amstelveen, Netherlands	5	Netherlands (3); England (6); Germany (7); Spain (9); Ireland (11)
6–12 August 2017	2017 EuroHockey Championship II	Glasgow, Scotland	2	Scotland (21); Wales (25)
Total			8	

=== Preliminary round ===
==== Pool A ====
Pos	Team	Pld	W	D	L	GF	GA	GD	Pts	Qualification
1	Belgium (H)	3	3	0	0	13	0	+13	9	Semi-finals
2	Spain	3	1	1	1	7	8	−1	4	Semi-finals
3	England	3	0	2	1	4	6	−2	2	Pool C
4	Wales	3	0	1	2	3	13	−10	1	Pool C

Source: FIH
Rules for classification: 1) points; 2) matches won; 3) goal difference; 4) goals for; 5) head-to-head result; 6) field goals for.
(H) Hosts

==== Pool B ====
Pos	Team	Pld	W	D	L	GF	GA	GD	Pts	Qualification
1	Netherlands	3	3	0	0	14	3	+11	9	Semi-finals
2	Germany	3	2	0	1	16	3	+13	6	Semi-finals
3	Ireland	3	0	1	2	4	13	−9	1	Pool C
4	Scotland	3	0	1	2	3	18	−15	1	Pool C

Source: FIH
Rules for classification: 1) points; 2) matches won; 3) goal difference; 4) goals for; 5) head-to-head result; 6) field goals for.

=== Final round ===
Semi-finals
22 August
Belgium	4
Germany	2
22 August
Netherlands	3
Spain	4

Final
24 August
Belgium	5
Spain	0
Third place
24 August
Germany	0
Netherlands	4

=== Final ranking ===
Rank	Team
Gold medal	Belgium
Silver medal	Spain
Bronze medal	Netherlands
4	Germany
5	England
6	Wales
7	Scotland
8	Ireland

Qualified for the 2020 Summer Olympics

Relegated to the EuroHockey Championship II

== 2019 Oceania Cup ==
=== Pool ===
Pos	Team	Pld	W	D	L	GF	GA	GD	Pts	Qualification
1	Australia (H)	3	2	1	0	9	2	+7	7	2020 Summer Olympics
2	New Zealand	3	0	1	2	2	9	−7	1	

Source: FIH
Rules for classification: 1) points; 2) goal difference; 3) goals scored; 4) head-to-head result.
(H) Hosts

== Olympic qualifying events ==
Originally, twelve teams were to take part in the Olympic qualifying events. These teams were to be drawn into six pairs; each pair playing a two-match, aggregate score series. The winner of each series qualifies for the Olympics. As Japan won the 2018 Asian Games (thereby qualifying twice, once as host and once as Asian champions), there will instead be 14 teams, 7 of whom will qualify.

=== Qualification ===
The participating teams were confirmed on 29 August 2019 by the International Hockey Federation.

Dates	Event(s)	Location	Quota	Qualifier(s)
19 January – 30 June 2019	2019 FIH Pro League		2	~~Australia~~ (Note: Australia, Belgium, and South Africa already qualified directly for the 2020 Summer Olympics by winning their continental championship so they were replaced by the highest ranked teams not already qualified.); ~~Belgium~~; Great Britain; Netherlands
26 April – 4 May 2019	2018–19 FIH Series Finals	Kuala Lumpur, Malaysia	2	Canada; Malaysia
6–15 June 2019	2018–19 FIH Series Finals	Bhubaneswar, India	1	India; ~~South Africa~~
15–23 June 2019	2018–19 FIH Series Finals	Le Touquet, France	2	France; Ireland
8 September 2019	FIH World Rankings		7	Austria; ~~Egypt~~ (Note: Egypt withdrew and was replaced by Russia.); Germany; New Zealand; Pakistan; Russia; South Korea; Spain
Total			14	

=== Matches ===
The draw for the final seven qualification ties was held on 9 September 2019. The ties will be played over two legs, both in the home team's venue.

Team 1	Agg.	Team 2	1st leg	2nd leg
Spain	6–5	France	3–3	3–2
Netherlands	10–5	Pakistan	4–4	6–1
Canada	6–6 (5–4 p.s.o.)	Ireland	3–5	3–1
India	11–3	Russia	4–2	7–1
New Zealand	6–2	South Korea	3–2	3–0
Germany	10–3	Austria	5–0	5–3
Great Britain	9–3	Malaysia	4–1	5–2

== See also ==
- Field hockey at the 2020 Summer Olympics – Women's qualification
