= Namibia women's national field hockey team =

Namibia
- Association: Namibia Hockey Union
- Confederation: AfHF (Africa)
- Head Coach: Melissa Gillies

FIH ranking
- Current: 53 ▼2 (25 July 2026)

Africa Cup of Nations
- Appearances: 4 (first in 1990)
- Best result: (silver) 2nd (1990)

African Games
- Appearances: 3 (first in 1995)
- Best result: 4th (1995, 1999)
Medal record
Africa Cup of Nations
Silver medal – second place	1990 Harare
Bronze medal – third place	1994 Pretoria
Bronze medal – third place	2005 Pretoria

The Namibia women's national field hockey team represents Namibia in women's international field hockey competitions and is controlled by the Namibia Hockey Union, the governing body for field hockey in Namibia.

== Tournament record ==
=== Africa Cup of Nations ===
- 1990 – (silver)
- 1994 – (bronze)
- 2005 – (bronze)
- 2022 – 6th
- 2025 – WD

=== African Olympic Qualifier ===
- 2007 – 6th
- 2015 – 4th
- 2019 – 5th
- 2023 – 5th

=== African Games ===
- 1995 – 4th
- 1999 – 4th
- 2003 – 6th

=== Commonwealth Games ===
- 1998 – 12th

=== FIH Hockey Series ===
- 2018–19 – Second round

=== Central-South Africa Qualifier for the Africa Cup of Nations ===
- 2025 – (gold)

== Results and fixtures ==
The following is a list of match results in the last 12 months, as well as any future matches that have been scheduled.

Win Draw Loss Fixture

=== 2026 ===
20 July 2026 Test Match 1	South Africa	4–0	Namibia	Cape Town, South Africa
10:00	de Waal 13'; Pearce 15+', 36'; Mokoena 51'	Report

21 July 2026 Test Match 2	South Africa	2–0	Namibia	Cape Town, South Africa
17:00	Pearce 2' de Waal 33'	Report

23 July 2026 Test Match 3	South Africa	4–1	Namibia	Cape Town, South Africa
17:00	Pearce 2', 51'; Zulu 3'; Wood 5'	Report	Rix 59'

24 July 2026 Test Match 4	South Africa	4–0	Namibia	Cape Town, South Africa
14:00	Maree 15'; Mali 48'; Pearce 54' du Toit 58'	Report

== See also ==
- Namibia men's national field hockey team
- Namibia women's national indoor hockey team
