= 2023 Women's FIH Hockey5s =

International field hockey competition

Tournament details
- City: Cairo, Egypt
- Dates: 20–21 October
- Teams: 5 (from 3 confederations)
- Venue: Gizeh Plateau

The 2023 Women's FIH Hockey5s is a women's field hockey series, staged in the Hockey5s format. The tournament was held at the Gizeh Plateau in Cairo, from 20 to 21 October.

The competition will be the second time that the International Hockey Federation hosted a senior international tournament in the Hockey5s format. The tournament will be held simultaneously with the Men's event.

Uruguay won the previous tournament, defeating Switzerland 3–1 in the final. However, they are not competing this year and can therefore not defend their title.

== Results ==
=== Preliminary round ===
Pos	Team	Pld	W	D	L	GF	GA	GD	Pts	Qualification
1	Egypt	0	0	0	0	0	0	0	0	Final
2	Ghana	0	0	0	0	0	0	0	0	Final
3	Oman	0	0	0	0	0	0	0	0	
4	Poland	0	0	0	0	0	0	0	0	
5	Switzerland	0	0	0	0	0	0	0	0	

First match(es) will be played: 20 October 2023. Source: FIH
Rules for classification: 1) points; 2) goal difference; 3) games won; 4) head-to-head result.

==== Fixtures ====
20 October 2023
09:40

Ghana	v	Oman
	Report

20 October 2023
11:00

Switzerland	v	Egypt
	Report

20 October 2023
12:20

Poland	v	Oman
	Report

20 October 2023
13:40

Ghana	v	Egypt
	Report

20 October 2023
15:00

Switzerland	v	Poland
	Report

20 October 2023
16:20

Egypt	v	Oman
	Report

21 October 2023
08:00

Ghana	v	Poland
	Report

21 October 2023
09:20

Oman	v	Switzerland
	Report

21 October 2023
10:40

Poland	v	Egypt
	Report

21 October 2023
11:20

Switzerland	v	Ghana
	Report

=== Final ===
21 October 2023
15:30

1st RR	v	2nd RR
	Report

== Goalscorers ==
Source: FIH
