= Tanzania men's national field hockey team =

Tanzania
- Association: Tanzania Hockey Association
- Confederation: AfHF (Africa)

FIH ranking
- Current: NR (4 October 2026)
- Highest: 73 (March–July 2015)
- Lowest: 84 (January–June 2019)

Olympic Games
- Appearances: 1 (first in 1980)
- Best result: 6th (1980)

Africa Cup of Nations
- Appearances: 1 (first in 1983)
- Best result: 4th (1983)

African Games
- Appearances: 1 (first in 1987)
- Best result: 6th (1987)

The Tanzania men's national field hockey team represent Tanzania in men's international competitions and is controlled by the Tanzania Hockey Association, the governing body for field hockey in Tanzania.

Tanzania has participated once at the Summer Olympics in 1980 when they finished sixth.

== Tournament record ==
=== Summer Olympics ===
- 1980 – 6th

=== Africa Cup of Nations ===
- 1983 – 6th

=== African Games ===
- 1987 – 6th

=== African Olympic Qualifier ===
- 2015 – 8th

=== Hockey World League ===
- 2014–15 – Round 1

== See also ==
- Tanzania women's national field hockey team
