= Jean-Leigh du Toit =

South African field hockey player

Personal information
- Born: 18 January 2000 (age 26) Johannesburg, South Africa

Sport
- Sport: Field hockey
- Position: Midfield
- Club: Harlequin
Senior career
Years	Team	Caps	Goals
2019-2023	Tuks	-	-
2019	Namaqualand Daisies	-	-
National team
Years	Team	Caps	Goals
2018	South Africa U–18	7	(2)
2022	South Africa U–21	5	(2)
2022-present	South Africa	34	(10)
Medal record
Women's field hockey
Representing South Africa
Africa Cup of Nations
Gold medal – first place	2025 Ismailia
African Youth Games
Gold medal – first place	2018 Algiers
- Updated on 4 October 2023

Jean-Leigh du Toit (born 18 January 2000) is a field hockey player from South Africa.

== Personal life ==
Jean-Leigh du Toit attended Hoërskool Dr EG Jansen, graduated at the University of Pretoria.

== Career ==
=== Under–18 ===
Du Toit made her debut for the South Africa U–18 in 2018 at the African Youth Games in Algiers.

=== Under–21 ===
Du Toit made her debut for the South Africa U–21 in 2022 at the FIH Junior World Cup in Potchefstroom.

=== National team ===
Following her successful debut in the junior squad, Du Toit was named in the national team for the first time. In May 2022, she was named in the squad for the FIH World Cup in Terrassa and Amsterdam. Shortly after this announcement, she was also named in the squad for the Commonwealth Games in Birmingham.
