= Luntu Ntloko =

South African field hockey player

Medal record

Representing South Africa

All Africa Games
Gold medal – first place	2003 Abuja, Nigeria	

Luntu Ntloko (born 19 October 1975) is a South African former field hockey player who competed in the 2000 Summer Olympics.
