= Field hockey at the 2003 All-Africa Games =

- Location: Abuja, Nigeria
- Dates: 6–17 October

Champions
- Men: Egypt
- Women: South Africa

Field Hockey was among the sports at the 8th All Africa Games held in October 2003 in Abuja, Nigeria. The play featured both a men's and women's tournament. The winners of each tournament qualified for the 2004 Summer Olympics.

== Medal summary ==
Event	Gold	Silver	Bronze
Men's tournament	Egypt	South Africa	Ghana
Women's tournament	South Africa; Caroline Birt; Fiona Butler; Lindsey Carlisle; Pietie Coetzee; Liesel Dorothy; Grazjyna Engelbrecht; Kate Hector; Johke Koornhof; Anli Kotze; Marsha Marescia; Luntu Ntloko; Tsoanelo Pholo; Juliet Ranyane; Susan Webber; Sharne Wehmeyer; Jennifer Wilson	Nigeria	Kenya

=== Medal table ===
* Host nation (Nigeria)

Rank	Nation	Gold	Silver	Bronze	Total
1	South Africa (RSA)	1	1	0	2
2	Egypt (EGY)	1	0	0	1
3	Nigeria (NGR)*	0	1	0	1
4	Ghana (GHA)	0	0	1	1
4	Kenya (KEN)	0	0	1	1
Totals (5 entries)		2	2	2	6

== Results ==
=== Final standings ===
Tournament	Men's	Women's
Final; Standings	1. Egypt; 2. South Africa; 3. Ghana; 4. Nigeria; 5. Zimbabwe	1. South Africa; 2. Nigeria; 3. Ghana; 4. Kenya; 5. Namibia; 6. Zimbabwe

== Women's tournament ==
Tournament
Tournament details
- Host country: Nigeria
- City: Abuja
- Dates: 7–17 October
- Teams: 6

Final positions
- Champions: South Africa (3rd title)
- Runner-up: Nigeria
- Third place: Kenya

Tournament statistics
- Matches played: 18
- Goals scored: 86 (4.78 per match)
- Top scorer: (South Africa) Pietie Coetzee (22 goals)

=== Participating nations ===
- Ghana
- Kenya
- Namibia
- Nigeria
- South Africa
- Zimbabwe

=== Preliminary round ===
==== Pool ====
Pos	Team	Pld	W	D	L	GF	GA	GD	Pts	Qualification
1	South Africa	5	5	0	0	45	0	+45	15	Gold Medal Match
2	Nigeria (H)	5	4	0	1	7	8	−1	12	Gold Medal Match
3	Ghana	5	3	0	2	8	12	−4	9	Bronze Medal Match
4	Kenya	5	2	0	3	4	13	−9	6	Bronze Medal Match
5	Namibia	5	0	1	4	4	17	−13	1	
6	Zimbabwe	5	0	1	4	4	22	−18	1	

Source: Planet Field Hockey
Rules for classification: 1) points; 2) matches won; 3) goal difference; 4) goals for; 5) head-to-head result; 6) field goals scored.
(H) Hosts

==== Fixtures ====
7 October 2003
14:00

Nigeria	1–0	Zimbabwe
	Report

7 October 2003
14:00

Namibia	0–2	Ghana
	Report	Ramatu 36', 51'

7 October 2003
18:00

South Africa	9–0	Kenya
	Report

9 October 2003
14:00

South Africa	8–0	Namibia
	Report

9 October 2003
16:00

Zimbabwe	0–1	Kenya
	Report

9 October 2003
18:00

Nigeria	2–0	Ghana
9', 67'	Report

11 October 2003
14:00

Ghana	5–2	Zimbabwe
	Report

11 October 2003
16:00

Kenya	3–1	Namibia
	Report

11 October 2003
18:00

Nigeria	0–7	South Africa
	Report

13 October 2003
14:00

Namibia	1–2	Nigeria
	Report

13 October 2003
16:00

South Africa	13–0	Zimbabwe
	Report

13 October 2003
18:00

Kenya	0–1	Ghana
	Report	Marmon-Halm 32'

15 October 2003
14:00

Ghana	0–8	South Africa
	Report

15 October 2003
16:00

Kenya	0–2	Nigeria
	Report

15 October 2003
18:00

Zimbabwe	2–2	Namibia
	Report

=== Classification round ===
==== Fifth and sixth place ====
17 October 2003
10:00

Namibia	0–1	Zimbabwe
	Report

=== Medal round ===
==== Bronze medal match ====
17 October 2003
15:00

Ghana	1–2	Kenya
Ramatu 34'	Report	Benedict 52'; Mbulo 58'

==== Gold medal match ====
17 October 2003
17:30

South Africa	10–0	Nigeria
Carlisle 3'; Webber 8', 43', 54'; Ntloko 13'; Coetzee 18', 34', 70+'; Koornhof 62'; Pholo 64'	Report
