= Christa Ramasimong =

South African field hockey player

Personal information
- Full name: Mathapelo Christa Ramasimong
- Born: 3 June 2000 (age 26)

Sport
- Sport: Field hockey
- Club: NWU
Senior career
Years	Team	Caps	Goals
2019-present	NWU	-	-
2019	Orange River Rafters	-	-
National team
Years	Team	Caps	Goals
2018	South African U18	7	(1)
2022	South Africa U21	5	-
2022-present	South African	5	-
Medal record
Women's field hockey
Representing South Africa
African Youth Games
Gold medal – first place	2018 Algiers
- Updated on 12 July 2022

Mathapelo Christa Ramasimong (birth 3 June 2000) is a South African field hockey player for the South African national team.

== International career ==
=== Under–18 ===
She made her debut for the South Africa U–18 in 2018 at the African Youth Games in Algiers.

=== Under–21 ===
Onthatile Zulu and her are the co-captains of the South Africa U21 team to compete in the FIH Women's Junior World Cup.

=== National team ===
She participated at the 2022 Women's FIH Hockey World Cup

== Personal life ==
Christa it studied at the North-West University
