= Paul van Ass =

Dutch hockey player and coach

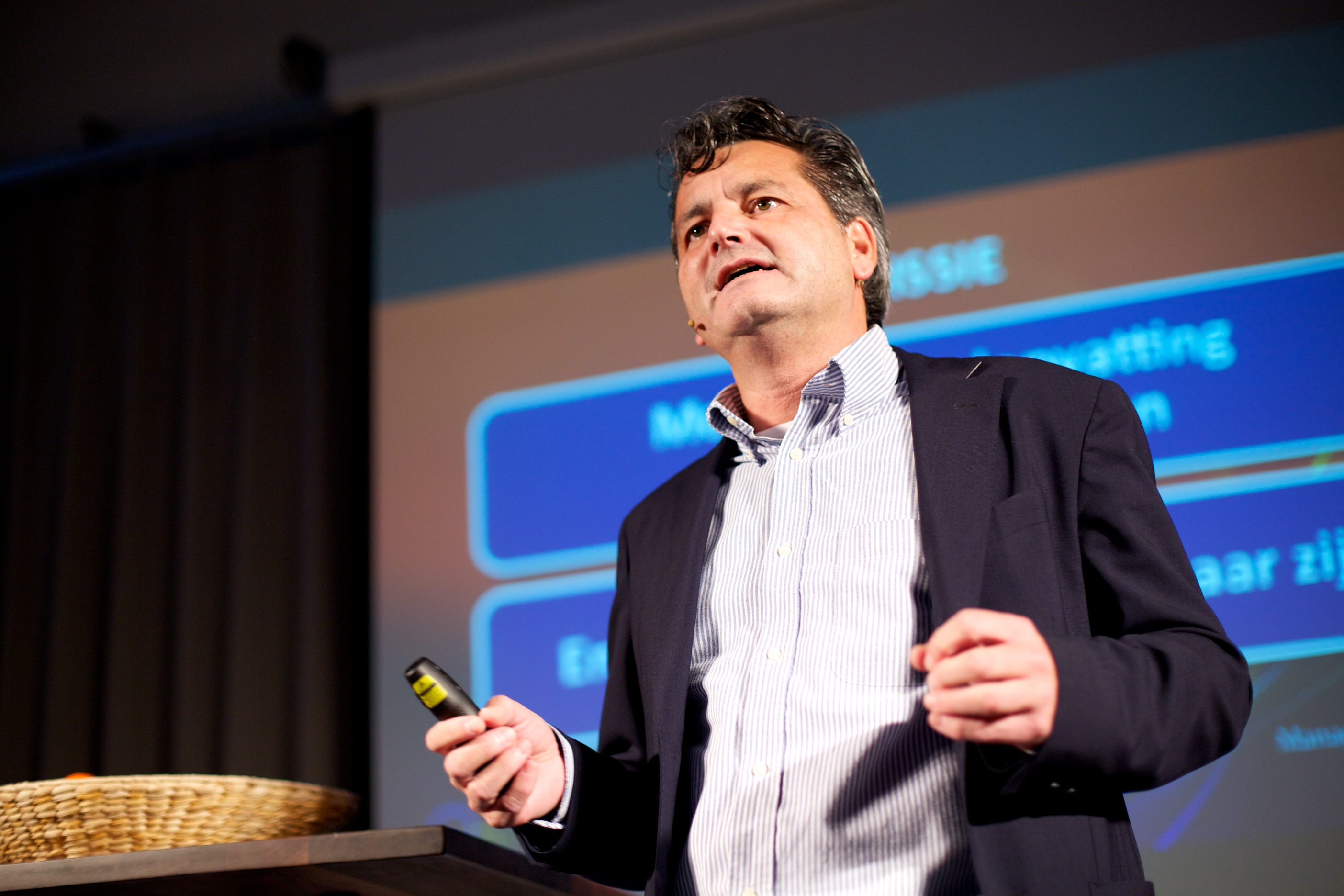
Paul van Ass, 2012

Paul van Ass (born 16 August 1960, Bergschenhoek) is a Dutch field hockey coach. After coaching for the Dutch club HGC, he became the coach of the national team, managing them at the 2012 Summer Olympics in the men's tournament. After his contract expired in 2014, he was declared the coach of the Indian team in 2015.

== Career ==
=== Club career ===
In his first major coaching position, head coach of the men's team of HGC, van Ass managed to save the team from degradation and lead them to a championship final in 2007, which was credited to his "opportunistic" style of coaching. HGC lost that game to HC Bloemendaal. Van Ass's HGC reached the final of the Euro Hockey League 2007–08 after beating HC Rotterdam in the semi-final, but lost to Uhlenhorster HC in overtime.

In the 2008–2009 season, he coached Jong Oranje (the men's under-21 national team) and was assistant-coach for the Netherlands national field hockey team; he returned to coach HGC (which had a disappointing season under Alexander Cox) for the 2009–2010 season. That team reached the final in the national championship, losing again to Bloemendaal, and qualified for the Euro Hockey League 2010–11.

=== National team ===
Despite having limited international experience, van Ass was appointed coach of the national team in June 2010, after Michel van den Heuvel was let go. The appointment came as a surprise: van Ass got the position in favor of Marc Lammers or another international top coach.

=== Olympic selection controversy ===
Besides not having a coaching certificate, van Ass did not select seasoned internationals Taeke Taekema and Teun de Nooijer (nicknamed "T&T"), the country's best known hockey players and icons of the sport. He cut the two from the national selection in January 2012. To justify his choice criticized them in an interview with de Volkskrant a few days later, for which he was accused of character assassination, and he later apologized for his words. After a public backlash Van Ass apologized to T&T at the end of January and took them back in March, his credibility having suffered greatly, but cut them again in July.

==== 2012 Olympics ====
The Dutch team played their opening game in Group B against India, beating them 3–2, and rallied against Belgium in their second match to beat them 3–1, thanks to penalty corner specialist Mink van der Weerden. The team reached the final by demolishing Great Britain 9–2, but lost to Germany, 2–1.
