= Egyptian Hockey Federation =

Governing body of field hockey in Egypt

Egypt Hockey Federation الاتحاد المصري للهوكي
- Sport: Field Hockey
- Jurisdiction: Egypt
- Abbreviation: EHF
- Affiliation: FIH
- Regional affiliation: AHF
- Headquarters: Nasr City, Cairo

Official website
- www.egyhockey.com
- (Egypt)

The Egypt Hockey Federation (Arabic: الاتحاد المصري للهوكي or EHF) is the governing body of field hockey in Egypt. The Headquarters of EHF are in Nasr City, Cairo. It is affiliated to IHF International Hockey Federation and AHF African Hockey Federation.

== Achievements ==
- Pablo Negri Award (2) (1983, 2005)

== See also ==
- Egypt men's national field hockey team
- Egypt women's national field hockey team
