= Field hockey at the 1995 All-Africa Games =

- Location: Harare, Zimbabwe
- Dates: 13-23 September

Champions
- Men: South Africa
- Women: South Africa

Field Hockey was among the sports at the 6th All Africa Games held in September 1995 in Harare, Zimbabwe. The play featured both a men's and women's tournament. The winners of each tournament qualified for the 2000 Summer Olympics.

== Medal summary ==
Event	Gold	Silver	Bronze
Men's tournament	South Africa	Egypt	Kenya
Women's tournament	South Africa	Zimbabwe	Kenya

=== Medal table ===
* Host nation (South Africa)

Rank	Nation	Gold	Silver	Bronze	Total
1	South Africa (RSA)	2	0	0	2
2	Egypt (EGY)	0	1	0	1
2	Zimbabwe (ZIM)*	0	1	0	1
4	Kenya (KEN)	0	0	2	2
Totals (4 entries)		2	2	2	6

== Results ==
=== Final standings ===
Tournament	Men's	Women's
Final; Standings	1. South Africa; 2. Egypt; 3. Kenya; 4. Zimbabwe; 5. Nigeria; 6. Namibia	1. South Africa; 2. Zimbabwe; 3. Kenya; 4. Namibia; 5. Nigeria; Ghana
