= Grazjyna Engelbrecht =

South African field hockey player

Medal record

Representing South Africa

All Africa Games
| Gold medal – first place | 2003 Abuja, Nigeria | |

Grazjyna Engelbrecht (born 26 April 1982) is a South African former field hockey player who competed in the 2004 Summer Olympics.
