= 2005 Men's Hockey Africa Cup of Nations =

Tournament details
- Host country: South Africa
- City: Pretoria
- Dates: 1–8 October
- Teams: 5 (from 1 confederation)

Final positions
- Champions: South Africa (4th title)
- Runner-up: Egypt
- Third place: Ghana

Tournament statistics
- Matches played: 12
- Goals scored: 58 (4.83 per match)

The 2005 Men's Hockey Africa Cup of Nations was the seventh edition of the Men's Hockey Africa Cup of Nations, the quadrennial international men's field hockey championship of Africa organised by the African Hockey Federation. It was held alongside the women's tournament in Pretoria, South Africa from 1 to 8 October 2005.

The hosts and three-time defending champions South Africa won their fourth title and qualified for the 2006 Men's Hockey World Cup by defeating Egypt 3–2 in penalty strokes in the final. Ghana won the bronze medal by defeating Nigeria 2–0.

== Results ==
=== Preliminary round ===
Pos	Team	Pld	W	D	L	GF	GA	GD	Pts	Qualification
1	South Africa (H)	4	3	1	0	22	1	+21	10	Final
2	Egypt	4	3	1	0	14	6	+8	10	Final
3	Ghana	4	1	1	2	9	10	−1	4	Third place game
4	Nigeria	4	1	1	2	7	11	−4	4	Third place game
5	Namibia	4	0	0	4	4	28	−24	0	

Source: Todor66
(H) Hosts

1 October 2005

Egypt	4–2	Ghana
Metwaly 3', 57'; Sameer 27', 38'	Report	Appiah 29'; Lamptey 70'

1 October 2005

South Africa	5–0	Nigeria
Symons 27', 38'; Carr 48'; Phillips 55', 56'	Report

3 October 2005

Egypt	7–2	Namibia
El-Shahat 9', 38'; Metwaly 34', 47'; Farouk 40'; Ezz 68'; Said 69'	Report	Swartbooi; Graig 55'

3 October 2005

South Africa	4–0	Ghana
Phillips 2'; Symons 12'; Tsolekile 20'; Gallagher 55'	Report

4 October 2005

Nigeria	4–2	Namibia
Menyei; Lamido 20', 49'; Ogodogun 57'	Report	Botha 46', 48'

4 October 2005

Egypt	1–1	South Africa
Metwaly 40'	Report	Phillips 58'

5 October 2005

Egypt	2–1	Nigeria
Elsayed 33'; Metwaly 53'	Report	Menyei 28'

5 October 2005

Ghana	5–0	Namibia
Oblitey 7'; Oblie 30', 36', 51'; Akaba 69'	Report

7 October 2005

Ghana	2–2	Nigeria

7 October 2005

South Africa	12–0	Namibia

=== Third place game ===
8 October 2005

Ghana	2–0	Nigeria

=== Final ===
8 October 2005

South Africa	0–0 (a.e.t.)	Egypt
Penalties
	3–2

== Final standings ==
Pos	Team	Qualification
1	South Africa (H)	2006 World Cup
2	Egypt	
3	Ghana	
4	Nigeria	
5	Namibia	

Source: Todor66
(H) Host

== See also ==
- 2005 Women's Hockey Africa Cup of Nations
