= Ian Symons =

South African field hockey player

Medal record

Men's field hockey

Representing South Africa

Africa Cup of Nations
Gold medal – first place	2005 Pretoria	

Ian Symons (born 14 May 1980) is a South African former field hockey player who competed in the 2004 Summer Olympics and in the 2008 Summer Olympics.
