= Field hockey at the 1999 All-Africa Games =

- Venue: Randburg Hockey Stadium
- Location: Johannesburg, South Africa
- Dates: 10-19 September

Champions
- Men: South Africa
- Women: South Africa

Field Hockey was among the sports at the 7th All Africa Games held in September 1999 in Johannesburg, South Africa. The play featured both a men's and women's tournament. The winners of each tournament qualified for the 2000 Summer Olympics.

== Medal summary ==
| Event | Gold | Silver | Bronze |
|---|---|---|---|
| Men's tournament | South Africa | Egypt | Kenya |
| Women's tournament | South Africa | Zimbabwe | Kenya |

=== Medal table ===
The Medal table is as follows:

* Host nation (South Africa)

| Rank | Nation | Gold | Silver | Bronze | Total |
|---|---|---|---|---|---|
| 1 | South Africa (RSA)* | 2 | 0 | 0 | 2 |
| 2 | Egypt (EGY) | 0 | 1 | 0 | 1 |
| 2 | Zimbabwe (ZIM) | 0 | 1 | 0 | 1 |
| 4 | Kenya (KEN) | 0 | 0 | 2 | 2 |
| Totals (4 entries) | | 2 | 2 | 2 | 6 |

== Results ==
=== Final standings ===
| Tournament | Men's | Women's |
| Final; Standings | 1. South Africa; 2. Egypt; 3. Kenya; 4. Zimbabwe; 5. Ghana; 6. Malawi | 1. South Africa; 2. Zimbabwe; 3. Kenya; 4. Namibia |
