= Jacolene McLaren =

South Africa field hockey player

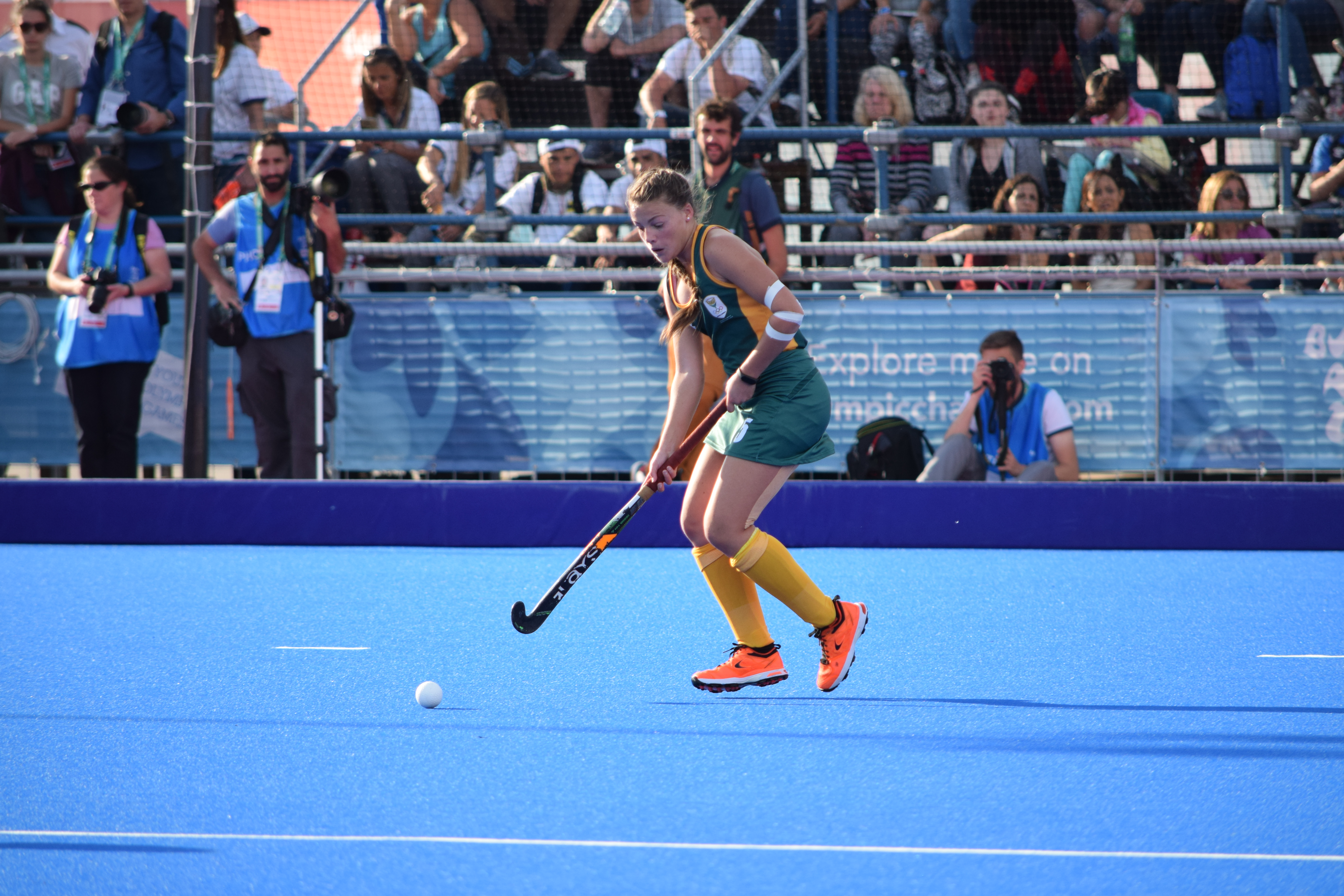
- Semi-finals of Hockey5s, during the 2018 Youth Olympic Games in Buenos Aires.

Personal information
- Born: 23 September 2000 (age 25) Bloemfontein, Free State
- Height: 162 cm (5 ft 4 in)
- Weight: 49 kg (108 lb)

Sport
- Sport: Field hockey
Youth career
- Years: Team
- 2017-2018: Southern Free State u18
Senior career
Years	Team	Caps	Goals
2019-2024	North-West University	10	-
2019-present	North-West University u25	9	-
2019	Orange River Rafters	7	-
National team
Years	Team	Caps	Goals
2018	South Africa u18	15	(2)
2021	South Africa u21	5	(0)
Medal record
Women's field hockey
Representing South Africa
African Youth Games
Gold medal – first place	2018 Algiers
- Updated on 12 April 2022

Jacolene McLaren (born 15 December 2001) is a South African field hockey player for the South African national team.

She participated at the 2018 Summer Youth Olympics, and 2022 Women's FIH Hockey Junior World Cup.

She attended Hoër Meisieskool Oranje and graduated at the North-West University.

Her sister Leané also is an international hockey player at Junior Africa cup.

== Honours ==
North West (Provincial)

- 2022 Senior IPT Women - B Section - Player of the Tournament
