= Namibia men's national field hockey team =

Namibia
- Association: Namibia Hockey Union
- Confederation: AfHF (Africa)
| Home | Away |

FIH ranking
- Current: 61 ▼1 (19 December 2025)
- Highest: 59 (2019)
- Lowest: 84 (August 2024)

Africa Cup of Nations
- Appearances: 4 (first in 1996)
- Best result: 5th (1996, 2005)

African Games
- Appearances: 1 (first in 1995)
- Best result: 5th (1995)

The Namibia men's national field hockey team represents Namibia in men's international field hockey competitions and is controlled by the Namibia Hockey Union, the governing body for field hockey in Namibia.

== Tournament record ==
=== Africa Cup of Nations ===
- 1996 – 5th
- 2000 – 6th
- 2005 – 5th
- 2022 – 7th
- 2025 – WD

=== African Games ===
- 1995 – 5th

=== African Olympic Qualifier ===
- 2015 – 7th
- 2019 – 6th

=== FIH Hockey Series ===
- 2018–19 – First round

=== Hockey World League ===
- 2016–17 – Round 1

=== Central-South Africa Qualifier for the Africa Cup of Nations ===
- 2025 – (gold)

== See also ==
- Namibia women's national field hockey team
