= 2009 Women's Hockey Africa Cup of Nations =

Field hockey tournament

Tournament details
- Host country: Ghana
- City: Accra
- Dates: 11–16 July
- Teams: 4 (from 1 confederation)

Final positions
- Champions: South Africa (4th title)
- Runner-up: Ghana
- Third place: Nigeria

Tournament statistics
- Matches played: 8
- Goals scored: 39 (4.88 per match)

The 2009 Women's Hockey Africa Cup of Nations was the fifth edition of the Women's Hockey Africa Cup of Nations, the quadrennial international women's field hockey championship of Africa organised by the African Hockey Federation. It was held alongside the men's tournament in Accra, Ghana from 11 to 16 July 2009.

South Africa became the champion winning their fourth title, beating Ghana 5–1 in the final. Nigeria won the 3rd-place playoff match against Egypt 4–1. The winner qualified for the 2010 Women's Hockey World Cup.

== Results ==
=== Preliminary round ===
Pos	Team	Pld	W	D	L	GF	GA	GD	Pts	Qualification
1	South Africa	3	3	0	0	19	0	+19	9	Final
2	Ghana (H)	3	2	0	1	7	6	+1	6	Final
3	Nigeria	3	1	0	2	2	7	−5	3	Third place game
4	Egypt	3	0	0	3	0	15	−15	0	Third place game

Source: Todor66
(H) Hosts

11 July 2009

South Africa	3–0	Nigeria

11 July 2009

Ghana	3–0	Egypt

12 July 2009

Nigeria	1–0	Egypt

12 July 2009

South Africa	5–0	Ghana

14 July 2009

South Africa	11–0	Egypt

14 July 2009

Ghana	4–1	Nigeria

=== Third place game ===
15 July 2009

Nigeria	4–1	Egypt

=== Final ===
16 July 2009

South Africa	5–1	Ghana

== Final standings ==
Pos	Team	Qualification
1	South Africa	2010 World Cup
2	Ghana (H)	
3	Nigeria	
4	Egypt	

Source: Todor66
(H) Host

== See also ==
- 2009 Men's Hockey Africa Cup of Nations
