= 2013 Women's Hockey Africa Cup of Nations =

Tournament details
- Host country: Kenya
- City: Nairobi
- Dates: 18–23 November
- Teams: 4 (from 1 confederation)

Final positions
- Champions: South Africa (5th title)
- Runner-up: Ghana
- Third place: Kenya

Tournament statistics
- Matches played: 8
- Goals scored: 85 (10.63 per match)
- Top scorer(s): (Ghana) Elizabeth Opoku (South Africa) Lilian du Plessis (9 goals)

The 2013 Women's Hockey Africa Cup of Nations was the sixth edition of the Women's Hockey Africa Cup of Nations, the quadrennial international women's field hockey championship of Africa organised by the African Hockey Federation. It was held in Nairobi, Kenya from 18 to 23 November 2013.

The four-time defending champions South Africa won the final against Ghana (3–2) for their fifth title. The winner qualified for the 2014 Women's Hockey World Cup.

== Results ==
=== Preliminary round ===
Pos	Team	Pld	W	D	L	GF	GA	GD	Pts	Qualification
1	South Africa	3	2	1	0	29	2	+27	7	Final
2	Ghana	3	2	1	0	22	3	+19	7	Final
3	Kenya (H)	3	1	0	2	16	7	+9	3	Third place game
4	Tanzania	3	0	0	3	1	56	−55	0	Third place game

Source: FIH
(H) Hosts

18 November 2013
12:00

South Africa	3–1	Kenya
Mayne 34' du Plessis 53'; Britz 60'	Report	Jow 5'

18 November 2013
14:00

Ghana	18–0	Tanzania
Boakye 4'; Swell-Grant 4', 63', 66'; Opoku 18', 24', 29', 31', 48'; Bamfo 25', 27', 30', 51'; Tenkorang 27'; Amoako 37', 40'; Own Goal 53'; Adampa 67'	Report

19 November 2013
10:00

Kenya	13–1	Tanzania
Rotich 2', 49'; Amutebi 5', 65', 66'; Aura 11'; Agunda 26'; Ommala 35'; Simiyu 38'; Jow 50'; Guchu 51'; Omaido 53', 57'	Report	Own Goal 47'

19 November 2013
12:00

Ghana	1–1	South Africa
Opoku 52'	Report	Evans 26'

21 November 2013
10:00

South Africa	25–0	Tanzania
Madsen 2'; Evans 3', 31'; Russell 3', 39'; Damons 8', 49', 63', 69'; Coston 14', 42', 45' du Plessis 17', 20', 25', 41', 48', 55', 58', 61'; Deetlefs 19'; Britz 21', 25'; Bobbs 22', 50'	Report

21 November 2013
12:00

Ghana	3–2	Kenya
Tenkorang 49'; Opoku 50', 51'	Report	Own Goal 13'; Omaido 37'

=== Third place game ===
22 November 2013
13:00

Kenya	12–0	Tanzania
	Report

=== Final ===
23 November 2013
13:00

Ghana	2–3	South Africa
Opoku 3'; Tenkorang 13'	Report	Evans 48'; Own Goal 55'; Britz 69'

== Final standings ==
Pos	Team	Qualification
1	South Africa	2014 World Cup
2	Ghana	
3	Kenya (H)	
4	Tanzania	

Source: FIH
(H) Host

== Goalscorers ==
There were 85 goals scored in 8 matches, for an average of 10.6 goals per match.

9 goals

- (Ghana) Elizabeth Opoku
- (South Africa) Lilian du Plessis

5 goals

- (Kenya) Jacqueline Jow

4 goals

- (Ghana) Racheal Bamfo
- (Kenya) Pauline Amutebi
- (Kenya) Margaret Rotich
- (Kenya) Caroline Guchu
- (Kenya) Audrey Omaido
- (South Africa) Tanya Britz
- (South Africa) Sulette Damons
- (South Africa) Celia Evans

3 goals

- (Ghana) Monica Swell-grant
- (Ghana) Nkansah Tenkorang
- (South Africa) Bernadette Coston

2 goals

- (Ghana) Cecilia Amoako
- (Kenya) Barbara Simiyu
- (South Africa) Quanita Bobbs
- (South Africa) Shelley Russell

1 goal

- (Ghana) Janet Adampa
- (Ghana) Serwaa Boakye
- (Kenya) Anita Agunda
- (Kenya) Rachel Owour
- (Kenya) Lilian Aura
- (Kenya) Betsy Ommala
- (Nigeria) James Samaila
- (South Africa) Lisa-Marié Deetlefs
- (South Africa) Kelly Madsen
- (South Africa) Jade Mayne

Source: FIH

== See also ==
- 2013 Men's Hockey Africa Cup of Nations
