= Nigeria women's national field hockey team =

Nigeria
- Association: Nigeria Hockey Federation
- Confederation: AfHF (Africa)

FIH ranking
- Current: 38 (25 July 2026)

World Cup
- Appearances: 2 (first in 1976)
- Best result: 10th (1978)

Africa Cup of Nations
- Appearances: 5 (first in 2005)
- Best result: (bronze) 3rd (2009, 2017)

African Games
- Appearances: 2 (first in 1995)
- Best result: (silver) 2nd (2003)
Medal record
Event	1st	2nd	3rd
African Games	0	2	0
Africa Cup of Nations	0	0	2
Total	0	2	2
African Games
Silver medal – second place	2003 Abuja	Team
Silver medal – second place	2023 Accra	Team
Africa Cup of Nations
Bronze medal – third place	2009 Accra	
Bronze medal – third place	2017 Ismailia	

The Nigeria women's national field hockey team represents Nigeria in women's international field hockey competitions.

== Tournament history ==
=== World Cup ===
- 1976 – 11th
- 1978 – 10th

=== African Games ===
- 1995 – 5th
- 2003 – (silver)
- 2023 – (silver)

=== Africa Cup of Nations ===
- 2005 – 4th
- 2009 – (bronze)
- 2017 – (bronze)
- 2022 – 5th
- 2025 – 4th

=== Commonwealth Games ===
- 2006 – 10th

=== African Olympic Qualifier ===
- 2007 – 4th
- 2015 – 6th
- 2019 – Withdrew
- 2023 – (silver)

=== Hockey World League ===
- 2012–13 – Round 1
- 2016–17 – Round 1

== See also ==
- Nigeria men's national field hockey team
