= 2025 Women's Hockey Africa Cup of Nations =

Field hockey tournament

Tournament details
- Host country: Egypt
- City: Ismailia
- Dates: 11–18 October
- Teams: 5 (from 1 confederation)
- Venue: Suez Canal Authority Hockey Stadium

Final positions
- Champions: South Africa (8th title)
- Runner-up: Ghana
- Third place: Kenya

Tournament statistics
- Matches played: 12
- Goals scored: 54 (4.5 per match)
- Top scorer: (Ghana) Mavis Berko (6 goals)
- Best player: (South Africa) Quanita Bobbs
- Best goalkeeper: (Ghana) Dorothy Ngissah

The 2025 Women's Hockey Africa Cup of Nations was the ninth edition of the Women's Hockey Africa Cup of Nations, the quadrennial international women's field hockey championship of Africa organised by the African Hockey Federation. The tournament was held alongside the men's tournament in Ismailia, Egypt from 11 to 18 October 2025.

South Africa, as the winner, qualified for the 2026 Women's FIH Hockey World Cup.

== Qualification ==
The highest-ranked team in the FIH Women's World Ranking qualified directly for the tournament while the other teams had to play in the regional qualifiers. The top two teams from each regional qualifier qualified for the tournament. The three regions were North-East Africa, North-West Africa, and Central-South Africa.

Highlighted are the countries that are participating in the 2025 Women's Hockey Africa Cup of Nations. Qualified Hosts

Dates	Event	Location	Quotas	Qualifiers
—N/a	Hosts	—N/a	1	Egypt
—N/a	FIH Women's World Ranking	—N/a	1	South Africa
Cancelled	North-West Africa Qualifier	—N/a	2	Ghana; Nigeria
Cancelled	North-East Africa Qualifier	—N/a	1	~~Uganda~~; Kenya
17–24 August 2024	Central-South Africa Qualifier	Harare, Zimbabwe	3	~~Namibia~~; ~~Zambia~~; ~~Zimbabwe~~
Total			8	

== Preliminary round ==
All times are local (UTC+2).

=== Standings ===
Pos	Team	Pld	W	D	L	GF	GA	GD	Pts	Qualification
1	South Africa	4	3	1	0	18	2	+16	10	Final
2	Ghana	4	3	0	1	20	7	+13	9	Final
3	Kenya	4	2	1	1	7	5	+2	7	Third place match
4	Nigeria	4	1	0	3	3	11	−8	3	Third place match
5	Egypt (H)	4	0	0	4	1	24	−23	0	

Source: FIH
Rules for classification: 1) points; 2) matches won; 3) goal difference; 4) goals for; 5) head-to-head result; 6) field goals for.
(H) Hosts

11 October 2025
12:00

Kenya	1–0	Nigeria
Owiti 50'	Report

Umpires:
Fatma Mahmoud (EGY)
Evelyn Fiador (GHA)

11 October 2025
16:00

Ghana	8–1	Egypt
Sarfoa 14'; Narkuor 21', 31', 33'; Afriyie 41'; Amoah 43'; Owusuaa 54'; Agyei 58'	Report	El-Sayed 48'

Umpires:
Ebitimi Sampou (NGR)
Lizelotte Wolter (NED)

12 October 2025
11:00

Ghana	5–1	Nigeria
Berko 13', 15', 29', 41', 56'	Report	Obukowho 5'

Umpires:
Mari-Elize Swart (RSA)
Linah Barasa (KEN)

12 October 2025
17:00

South Africa	10–0	Egypt
Zulu 3', 59'; Mokoena 15'; Pearce 17'; Mali 26'; De Waal 28', 56'; Augousti 50', 54'; Fourie 57'	Report

Umpires:
Ebitimi Sampou (NGR)
Evelyn Fiador (GHA)

14 October 2025
13:00

Ghana	2–3	South Africa
Amoah 19'; Berko 24'	Report	Mali 12', 18'; Du Toit 17'

Umpires:
Linah Barasa (KEN)
Fatma Mahmoud (EGY)

14 October 2025
17:00

Egypt	0–4	Kenya
	Report	Anjao 15'; Chebet 34'; Kemunto 48'; Owiti 58'

Umpires:
Mari-Elize Swart (RSA)
Lizelotte Wolter (NED)

15 October 2025
11:00

Kenya	0–0	South Africa
	Report

Umpires:
Ebitimi Sampou (NGR)
Fatma Mahmoud (EGY)

15 October 2025
13:00

Nigeria	2–0	Egypt
Christopher 11'; Njoku 34'	Report

Umpires:
Linah Barasa (KEN)
Evelyn Fiador (GHA)

17 October 2025
11:00

South Africa	5–0	Nigeria
Du Toit 1'; Bobbs 34'; Pearce 41', 49'; Maree 56'	Report

Umpires:
Lizelotte Wolter (NED)
Evelyn Fiador (GHA)

17 October 2025
13:00

Kenya	2–5	Ghana
Bwire 8'; Chebet 23'	Report	Konadu 6', 34', 38'; Amoah 36'; Narkuor 48'

Umpires:
Mari-Elize Swart (RSA)
Ebitimi Sampou (NGR)

== First to fourth place classification ==
=== Third and fourth place ===
18 October 2025
11:00

Kenya	1–0	Nigeria
Bwire 47'	Report

Umpires:
Mari-Elize Swart (RSA)
Evelyn Fiador (GHA)

=== Final ===
18 October 2025
15:30

South Africa	4–0	Ghana
Du Toit 3', 30'; De Waal 5'; Pearce 14'	Report

Umpires:
Lizelotte Wolter (NED)
Fatma Mahmoud (EGY)

== Statistics and awards ==
=== Final standings ===
Pos	Team	Qualification
1st place, gold medalist(s)	South Africa	2026 FIH Hockey World Cup
2nd place, silver medalist(s)	Ghana	
3rd place, bronze medalist(s)	Kenya	
4	Nigeria	
5	Egypt (H)	

Source: FIH
(H) Host

=== Goalscorers ===
There were 54 goals scored in 12 matches, for an average of 4.5 goals per match.

6 goals

- (Ghana) Mavis Berko

4 goals

- (Ghana) Vivian Narkuor
- (South Africa) Hannah Pearce
- (South Africa) Jean-Leigh du Toit

3 goals

- (Ghana) Adwoa Amoah
- (Ghana) Jennifer Konadu
- (South Africa) Ongeziwe Mali
- (South Africa) Kayla de Waal

2 goals

- (Kenya) Grace Bwire
- (Kenya) Eleanor Chebet
- (Kenya) Alice Owiti
- (South Africa) Taheera Augousti
- (South Africa) Onthatile Zulu

1 goal

- (Egypt) Rania El-Sayed
- (Ghana) Lydia Afriyie
- (Ghana) Racheal Agyei
- (Ghana) Margaret Owusuaa
- (Ghana) Martha Sarfoa
- (Kenya) Joan Anjao
- (Kenya) Naom Kemunto
- (Nigeria) Joy Christopher
- (Nigeria) Queen Esther Njoku
- (Nigeria) Faith Obukowho
- (South Africa) Quanita Bobbs
- (South Africa) Tegan Fourie
- (South Africa) Caylin Maree
- (South Africa) Ntsopa Mokoena

Source: FIH

== See also ==
- 2025 Men's Hockey Africa Cup of Nations
