= Egypt women's national field hockey team =

Egypt
- Association: Egyptian Hockey Federation
- Confederation: AfHF (Africa)

FIH ranking
- Current: 70 ▲2 (10 March 2026)
- Highest: 47 (2009,2010)
- Lowest: 72 (2025)

First international
- South Africa 20–0 Egypt (Harare, Zimbabwe; 7 November 1998)

Biggest defeat
- South Africa 20–0 Egypt (Harare, Zimbabwe; 7 November 1998)

Africa Cup of Nations
- Appearances: 4 (first in 1998)
- Best result: 4th (1998, 2009)

The Egypt women's national field hockey team represents Egypt in women's international field hockey competitions. The team is administered by Egyptian Hockey Federation, which governs the sport in the country.

== Tournament record ==
=== Africa Cup of Nations ===
- 1998 – 4th place
- 2009 – 4th place
- 2017 – 5th place
- 2025 – 5th place

== Hockey5s Team ==
=== African women’s Hockey5s Cup of Nations ===
- 2022 – 4th place

== Junior team ==
=== Junior Africa Hockey Cup ===
- 2001 – (silver)
- 2008 – (silver)
- 2023 – (bronze)

== See also ==
- Egypt men's national field hockey team
