= Kayla de Waal =

South African field hockey player

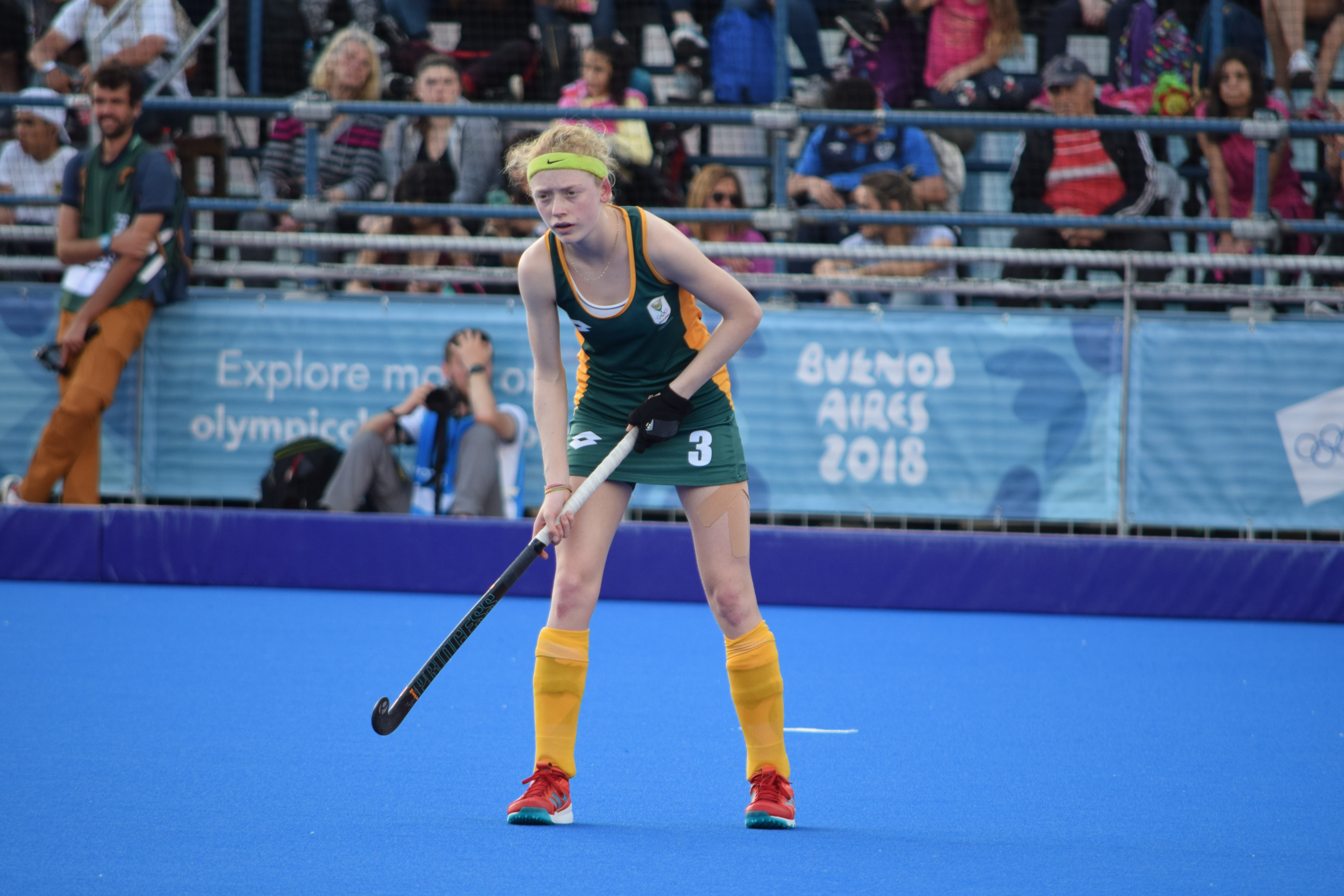
- Semi-finals of Hockey5s, during the 2018 Youth Olympic Games in Buenos Aires.

Personal information
- Born: 11 June 2000 (age 26)
- Height: 168 cm (5 ft 6 in)
- Weight: 54 kg (119 lb)

Sport
- Sport: Field hockey
- Club: TSV Mannheim
Youth career
- Years: Team
- 2018: South Africa U18
Senior career
Years	Team	Caps	Goals
2021–2023	Stellenbosch University	-	-
–present	Western Province	-	-
2024–2025	WPCC	-	-
National team
Years	Team	Caps	Goals
2022	South Africa U21	5	(0)
2022–present	South Africa	33	(8)
2018–present	South African Indoor	60	(34)
Medal record
Representing South Africa
Women's field hockey
Africa Cup of Nations
Gold medal – first place	2025 Ismailia
African Youth Games
Gold medal – first place	2018 Algiers	Team
Women's indoor hockey
Nkosi Cup
Silver medal – second place	2023 Cape Town
Silver medal – second place	2024 Cape Town
- Updated on 9 October 2025

Kayla de Waal (born 11 June 2000) is a South African field hockey player for the South African national team.

== International career ==
=== Under–18 ===
Retief Ochse and she is South Africa as Biathle is 2017 UIPM Biathle World Championships, Relay Biathle Mix Youth A Under-19 Biathle to rank 4. She as biathle Under-19 to rank 6.

She made South Africa U–18 as the African Youth Games in 2018 and 2018 Summer Youth Olympics.

=== Under–21 ===
Kayla made her debut for the South Africa U–21 in 2022 at the FIH Junior World Cup in Potchefstroom.

=== National team ===
Kayla participated at the 2022 Women's FIH Hockey World Cup

Following her successful debut in the indoor Test is South Africa v. Switzerland.

== Personal life ==
She attended Stellenberg High School before transferring to Herschel Girls School and graduated at the Stellenbosch University.

== Awards ==
=== Western Province ===
- 2022 - Senior Indoor IPT - Leading Goalscorer
