= Field hockey at the 2018 African Youth Games – Girls' tournament =

2018 African Youth Games – Girls' tournament
Tournament details
- Host country: Algeria
- City: Algiers
- Dates: 19–26 July
- Teams: 6
- Venue: Stade Ferhani

Final positions
- Champions: South Africa (1st title)
- Runner-up: Namibia
- Third place: Zimbabwe

Tournament statistics
- Matches played: 20
- Goals scored: 119 (5.95 per match)
- Top scorer: (South Africa) Angela Welham (14 goals)

The girls' hockey5s event at the 2018 African Youth Games in Algiers was held at the Stade Ferhani from 19 to 26 July 2018. The tournament served as a direct qualifier for the Youth Olympic Games, with the winner, runner-up and third placed team qualifying.

== Qualified teams ==
- Algeria
- Ghana
- Namibia
- Nigeria
- South Africa
- Zimbabwe

== Format ==
The six teams will be placed into one group. The top four teams advance to the semifinals to determine the winner in a knockout system. The bottom two teams play against each other for 5th and 6th place.

== Results ==
All times are local (UTC+1).

=== Preliminary round ===
Pos	Team	Pld	W	D	L	GF	GA	GD	Pts	Qualification
1	South Africa	5	4	1	0	36	6	+30	13	Semifinals
2	Namibia	5	3	1	1	24	8	+16	10	Semifinals
3	Ghana	5	3	0	2	23	8	+15	9	Semifinals
4	Zimbabwe	5	2	2	1	20	10	+10	8	Semifinals
5	Nigeria	5	1	0	4	2	17	−15	3	5th/6th place
6	Algeria (H)	5	0	0	5	1	57	−56	0	5th/6th place

Source: FIH
Rules for classification: 1) points; 2) goal difference; 3) goals scored; 4) head-to-head result.
(H) Hosts

19 July 2018
10:00

South Africa	19–0	Algeria
De Waal 1', 2', 7', 10', 17'; McLaren 2', 3'; Welham 2', 13', 16', 20', 20'; Hardie 4', 8', 11', 15'; Nkosi 13', 17'; Hendricks 18'	Report

Umpires:
Cynthia Clement (GHA)
Sophie Bockelmann (GER)

19 July 2018
11:00

Ghana	4–0	Zimbabwe
Otoo 3'; Akoto 7'; Gbatti 18'; Copson 19'	Report

Umpires:
Melissa Taylor (RSA)
Fatma Mahmoud (EGY)

19 July 2018
14:00

Nigeria	0–4	Namibia
	Report	Meyer 5'; Cormack 11', 14'; Kruger 18'

Umpires:
Shi Him Tang (HKG)
Rita Katoka (ZAM)

20 July 2018
14:00

Ghana	2–3	Namibia
Donkor 6'; Otoo 9'	Report	Meyer 5'; J. van Rooyen 15'; Myburgh 18'

Umpires:
Sophie Bockelmann (GER)
Shi Him Tang (HKG)

20 July 2018
15:00

South Africa	3–3	Zimbabwe
De Waal 2'; Hardie 5', 17'	Report	Pope 6'; Beekes 11'; N. Terblanche 14'

Umpires:
Cynthia Clement (GHA)
Fatma Mahmoud (EGY)

20 July 2018
16:00

Algeria	0–2	Nigeria
	Report	Christopher 6'; Familusi 16'

Umpires:
Melissa Taylor (RSA)
Rita Katoka (ZAM)

21 July 2018
14:00

Namibia	3–3	Zimbabwe
Myburgh 5'; J. van Rooyen 11'; Cormack 14'	Report	Dobbie 8'; A. Terblanche 16'; N. Terblanche 17'

Umpires:
Sophie Bockelmann (GER)
Melissa Taylor (RSA)

21 July 2018
15:00

Nigeria	0–7	South Africa
	Report	De Waal 2', 17'; Welham 9', 13', 19', 20'; Du Toit 15'

Umpires:
Cynthia Clement (GHA)
Shi Him Tang (HKG)

21 July 2018
16:00

Algeria	0–13	Ghana
	Report	Gbatti 1', 2', 6', 7', 16'; Otoo 3', 14'; Quayson 4'; Copson 5'; Akoto 8', 11', 16'; Okine 18'

Umpires:
Sampou Bitimi (NGA)
Fatma Mahmoud (EGY)

23 July 2018
10:00

Zimbabwe	4–0	Nigeria
Dobbie 3'; Terblanche 8', 9', 18'	Report

Umpires:
Shi Him Tang (HKG)
Melissa Taylor (RSA)

23 July 2018
11:00

Ghana	2–5	South Africa
Donkor 5'; Gbatti 16'	Report	Nkosi 5'; Du Toit 8'; Welham 11', 16'; Ramasimong 17'

Umpires:
Sophie Bockelmann (GER)
Sampou Ebitmi (NGA)

23 July 2018
12:00

Namibia	13–1	Algeria
Myburgh 3', 6', 13', 18'; Cormack 4', 8', 9', 16'; Meyer 5', 20'; J. van Rooyen 11'; Wessels 15'; Schimming 19'	Report	Boualia 15'

Umpires:
Rita Katoka (ZAM)
Fatma Mahmoud (EGY)

24 July 2018
12:00

South Africa	2–1	Namibia
De Waal 10', 12'	Report	Myburgh 2'

Umpires:
Sophie Bockelmann (GER)
Cynthia Clement (GHA)

24 July 2018
13:00

Nigeria	0–2	Ghana
	Report	Donkor 3'; Gbatti 8'

Umpires:
Shi Him Tang (HKG)
Melissa Taylor (RSA)

24 July 2018
14:00

Zimbabwe	10–0	Algeria
Pope 2', 4'; Beekes 4'; Herbst 7', 9'; Dobbie 10', 20'; Trivella 12'; Mtausi 14', 17'	Report

=== Fifth and sixth place classification ===
25 July 2018
14:00

Nigeria	3–0	Algeria
Familusi 12', 18'; Christopher 15'	Report

Umpires:
Rita Katoka(ZAM)
Fatma Mahmoud(EGY)

=== First to fourth place classification ===
Semi-finals
South Africa	2
Zimbabwe	0
Namibia	2
Ghana	1

Final
South Africa	2
Namibia	0
Third place
Zimbabwe	2
Ghana	1

==== Semifinals ====
25 July 2018
15:00

South Africa	2–0	Zimbabwe
Nkosi 7'; Welham 8'	Report

Umpires:
Cynthia Clement(GHA)
Shi Tang(HKG)

25 July 2018
16:00

Namibia	2–1	Ghana
Cormack 5', 17'	Report	Quayson 8'

Umpires:
Melissa Taylor(RSA)
Ebitimi Sampou(NGR)

==== Third and fourth place ====
26 July 2018
14:00

Zimbabwe	2–1	Ghana
A. Terblanche 13'; Herbst 15'	Report	Akoto 17'

Umpires:
Shi Tang(HKG)
Melissa Taylor(RSA)

==== Final ====
26 July 2018
15:00

South Africa	2–0	Namibia
Welham 13', 16'	Report

Umpires:
Sophie Bockelmann(GER)
Ebitimi Sampou(NGR)

== Final standings ==
Rank	Team
1st place, gold medalist(s)	South Africa
2nd place, silver medalist(s)	Namibia
3rd place, bronze medalist(s)	Zimbabwe
4	Ghana
5	Nigeria
6	Algeria

Team qualified to the 2018 Summer Youth Olympics

== Goalscorers ==
There have been 119 goals scored in 20 matches, for an average of 5.95 goals per match.

14 goals

- (South Africa) Angela Welham

10 goals

- (South Africa) Kayla de Waal

9 goals

- (Namibia) Kiana-Che Cormack

8 goals

- (Ghana) Asana Gbatti

7 goals

- (Namibia) Taramarie Myburgh

6 goals

- (South Africa) India Hardie

5 goals

- (Ghana) Charity Akoto
- (Zimbabwe) Alexi Terblanche

4 goals

- (Ghana) Eleanor Otoo
- (Namibia) Danja Meyer
- (South Africa) Angel Nkosi
- (Zimbabwe) Ruvimbo Dobbie

3 goals

- (Ghana) Rebecca Donkor
- (Namibia) Joane van Rooyen
- (Nigeria) Familusi
- (Zimbabwe) Simone Herbst
- (Zimbabwe) Lilian Pope

2 goals

- (Ghana) Hagiet Copson
- (Ghana) Racheal Quayson
- (Nigeria) Joy Christopher
- (South Africa) Jacolene McLaren
- (South Africa) Jean-Leigh du Toit
- (Zimbabwe) Mercedes Beekes
- (Zimbabwe) Mazvita Mtausi
- (Zimbabwe) Natalie Terblanche

1 goal

- (Algeria) Assia Boualia
- (Ghana) Dede Okine
- (Namibia) Jahntwa Kruger
- (Namibia) Kaela Schimming
- (Namibia) Cele Wessels
- (South Africa) Ammaarah Hendricks
- (South Africa) Mathapelo Ramasimong
- (Zimbabwe) Taya Trivella

Source: FIH
