= 2017 Women's Hockey Africa Cup of Nations =

Field hockey tournament

Tournament details
- Host country: Egypt
- City: Ismailia
- Dates: 22–29 October
- Teams: 5 (from 1 confederation)
- Venue: Suez Canal Authority Hockey Stadium

Final positions
- Champions: South Africa (6th title)
- Runner-up: Ghana
- Third place: Nigeria

Tournament statistics
- Matches played: 12
- Goals scored: 48 (4 per match)
- Top scorer: (South Africa) Dirkie Chamberlain (8 goals)

The 2017 Women's Hockey Africa Cup of Nations was the seventh edition of the Women's Hockey Africa Cup of Nations, the quadrennial international women's field hockey championship of Africa organised by the African Hockey Federation. It was held in Ismailia, Egypt from 22 to 29 October 2017.

Zambia withdrew before the tournament. The winner qualified for the 2018 Women's Hockey World Cup.

The five-time defending champions South Africa won their sixth title, after beating Ghana 4–0 in the final. Nigeria won the 3rd-place playoff match against Kenya on penalties after a 3–3 draw in regular time.

== Teams ==
- Egypt (hosts)
- Ghana
- Kenya
- Nigeria
- South Africa
- Zambia (withdrew)

== Results ==
All times are local (UTC+2).

=== Preliminary round ===
Pos	Team	Pld	W	D	L	GF	GA	GD	Pts	Qualification
1	South Africa	4	4	0	0	24	0	+24	12	Final
2	Ghana	4	3	0	1	9	4	+5	9	Final
3	Kenya	4	2	0	2	3	7	−4	6	Third place game
4	Nigeria	4	0	1	3	1	8	−7	1	Third place game
5	Egypt (H)	4	0	1	3	1	19	−18	1	

Source: FIH
Rules for classification: 1) points; 2) goal difference; 3) goals scored; 4) head-to-head result.
(H) Hosts

22 October 2017
12:00

Nigeria	1–1	Egypt
Bomiegha 18'	Report	Morsy 28'

Suez Canal Authority Hockey Stadium
Umpires:
Andrea Nicholson (RSA)
Tina Agunda (KEN)

22 October 2017
14:00

Kenya	0–5	South Africa
	Report	Manuel 18', 58'; Chamberlain 25', 54'; Glasby 36'

Suez Canal Authority Hockey Stadium
Umpires:
Celine Martin-Schmets (BEL)
Sampou Ebitmi (NGA)

23 October 2017
12:00

South Africa	5–0	Nigeria
Chamberlain 2'; Damons 6', 30', 60+'; Evans 49'	Report

Suez Canal Authority Hockey Stadium
Umpires:
Cynthia Clement (GHA)
Tina Agunda (KEN)

23 October 2017
14:00

Kenya	1–2	Ghana
Guchu 29'	Report	Boakye 51'; Umaru 54'

Suez Canal Authority Hockey Stadium
Umpires:
Claire Druijts (NED)
Fatma Abdel Hamid (EGY)

25 October 2017
12:00

Ghana	6–0	Egypt
Narkuor 10', 18'; Opoku 11'; Umaru 22', 44'; Fosuaa 44'	Report

Suez Canal Authority Hockey Stadium
Umpires:
Sampou Ebitmi (NGA)
Celine Martin-Schmets (BEL)

25 October 2017
14:00

Kenya	1–0	Nigeria
Amutebi 59'	Report

Suez Canal Authority Hockey Stadium
Umpires:
Cynthia Clement (GHA)
Fatma Abdel Hamid (EGY)

26 October 2017
10:00

South Africa	11–0	Egypt
Damons 5', 45+'; Chamberlain 10', 38', 48', 48'; Van Jaarsveldt 13'; Bobbs 25'; Baxter 35'; Du Plessis 41', 59'	Report

Suez Canal Authority Hockey Stadium
Umpires:
Deborah Agunda (KEN)
Sampou Ebitmi (NGA)

26 October 2017
12:00

Ghana	1–0	Nigeria
Afriyie 33'	Report

Suez Canal Authority Hockey Stadium
Umpires:
Claire Druijts (NED)
Andrea Nicholson (RSA)

28 October 2017
12:00

Ghana	0–3	South Africa
	Report	Evans 4'; Davids 7'; Chamberlain 18'

Suez Canal Authority Hockey Stadium
Umpires:
Celine Martin-Schmets (BEL)
Deborah Agunda (KEN)

28 October 2017
14:00

Egypt	0–1	Kenya
	Report	Nekesa 43'

Suez Canal Authority Hockey Stadium
Umpires:
Cynthia Clement (GHA)
Claire Druijts (NED)

=== Classification round ===
==== Third and fourth place ====
29 October 2017
11:00

Kenya	3–3	Nigeria
Okumu 24'; Vodoti 39'; Karanja 52'	Report	Uwuoezi 20'; Ovo 44'; Johnson 46'
Penalties
Kuira (penalty shoot-out scored); Omaido (penalty shoot-out missed); Aura (penalty shoot-out missed); Karanja (penalty shoot-out missed); Aura (penalty shoot-out missed)	1–2	(penalty shoot-out missed) Uwuoezi; (penalty shoot-out scored) Irame; (penalty shoot-out missed) John; (penalty shoot-out scored) Ovo

Suez Canal Authority Hockey Stadium
Umpires:
Andrea Nicholson (RSA)
Fatma Abdel Hamid (EGY)

==== Final ====
29 October 2017
13:30

South Africa	4–0	Ghana
Davids 19'; Du Plessis 25'; Glasby 29', 47'	Report

Suez Canal Authority Hockey Stadium
Umpires:
Celine Martin-Schmets (BEL)
Claire Druijts (NED)

== Final standings ==
Pos	Team	Qualification
1	South Africa	2018 World Cup
2	Ghana	
3	Nigeria	
4	Kenya	
5	Egypt (H)	

Source: FIH
(H) Host

== Goalscorers ==
There were 48 goals scored in 12 matches, for an average of 4 goals per match.

8 goals

- (South Africa) Dirkie Chamberlain

5 goals

- (South Africa) Sulette Damons

3 goals

- (Ghana) Nafisatu Umaru
- (South Africa) Lilian du Plessis
- (South Africa) Tarryn Glasby

2 goals

- (Ghana) Vivian Narkuor
- (South Africa) Illse Davids
- (South Africa) Celia Evans
- (South Africa) Candice Manuel

1 goal

- (Egypt) Nahla Morsy
- (Ghana) Lydia Afriyie
- (Ghana) Serwaa Boakye
- (Ghana) Emelia Fosuaa
- (Ghana) Elizabeth Opoku
- (Kenya) Pauline Amutebi
- (Kenya) Caroline Guchu
- (Kenya) Yvonne Karanja
- (Kenya) Teresa Nekesa Juma
- (Kenya) Maureen Okumu
- (Kenya) Sandra Vodoti
- (Nigeria) Ikiriko Bomiegha
- (Nigeria) Benedicta Johnson
- (Nigeria) Eleho Ovo
- (Nigeria) Florence Uwuoezi
- (South Africa) Stephanie Baxter
- (South Africa) Quanita Bobbs
- (South Africa) Sylvia van Jaarsveldt

Source: FIH

== See also ==
- 2017 Men's Hockey Africa Cup of Nations
