= Namibia Hockey Union =

Sports governing body in Namibia

- Sport: Indoor Hockey; Field Hockey
- Jurisdiction: Namibia
- Abbreviation: NHU
- Affiliation: FIH
- Regional affiliation: AHF
- Headquarters: Windhoek, Namibia
- President: Reagon Graig
- Vice president(s): Marietta Stoffberg (women) & Derick Bronkhorst (men)
- Secretary: Michelle Finch
- Sponsor: MTC Namibia, NAMDIA, Standard Bank Namibia, NamibRe, Bank Windhoek

Official website
- namibiahockey.org
- Other key staff: Julia Lasarus (Treasurer) Sedtric Makati [Executive: Rules, Umpires and Leagues] Tunomwaameni Epafras (Executive: Marketing and Communications) Yolande Fourie (Executive: Coaching Affairs) Ingrid Hermanus (Executive: Tours and Tournaments) Magreth Mengo (Athletes' Representative)
- (Namibia)

The Namibia Hockey Union (NHU) is the governing body of field hockey in Namibia. It is affiliated to IHF International Hockey Federation and AHF African Hockey Federation. The headquarters of the NHU are in Windhoek, Namibia.

== Executive Committee ==
Position	Name
President	Reagon Graig
Vice-President (Women)	Marietta Stoffberg
Vice-President (Men)	Conrad Wessels
Secretary-General	Jens Unterlechner
Treasurer	Julia Lasarus
Additional Member: Tours and Tournaments	Ingrid Hermanus
Additional Member: Umpires, Fixtures, Leagues	Sedtric Makati
Additional Member: Marketing and Communications	Tunomwaameni Epafras
Athletes' Representative	Magreth Mengo

== See also ==
- African Hockey Federation
