= Tanzania Hockey Association =

- Sport: Field Hockey
- Jurisdiction: Tanzania
- Affiliation: FIH
- Regional affiliation: AHF
- (Tanzania)

The Tanzania Hockey Association, also known as Twende Hockey Foundation, is the governing body of field hockey in Tanzania. It is affiliated to IHF International Hockey Federation and AHF African Hockey Federation.

== History ==
Tanzania men's hockey played in the 1980 Summer Olympics in Moscow. They played five round-robin matches and lost all of them.

In 2015, Tanzania sent men's and women's hockey teams for All African Olympic Qualifiers for the 2016 Summer Olympics.

== See also ==
- African Hockey Federation
