= South Africa women's national under-18 field hockey team =

South Africa
- Association: South African Hockey Association
- Confederation: AfHF (Africa)
Home	Away

Youth Olympic Games
- Appearances: 3 (first in 2010)
- Best result: 4th (2018)

African Youth Games
- Appearances: 1 (first in 2014)
- Best result: 1st (2014)

The South Africa women's national under-18 field hockey team represents South Africa in youth international field hockey matches and tournaments.

== Tournament history ==
=== Youth Olympic Games ===
- 2010 – 6th
- 2014 – 8th
- 2018 – 4th

=== African Youth Games ===
- 2018 – (gold)

=== Commonwealth Youth Games ===
- 2000 – (bronze)

== Current squad ==
The squad was announced on 6 September 2018.

Head coach: Tsoanelo Pholo

1. Mishka Ellis (GK)
2. Jacolene McLaren
3. Samantha Smuts
4. Angela Welham (C)
5. Ammaarah Hendricks (C)
6. Kayla de Waal
7. Nepo Serage (GK)
8. Angel Nkosi
9. Zimkhitha Weston

== Gallery ==
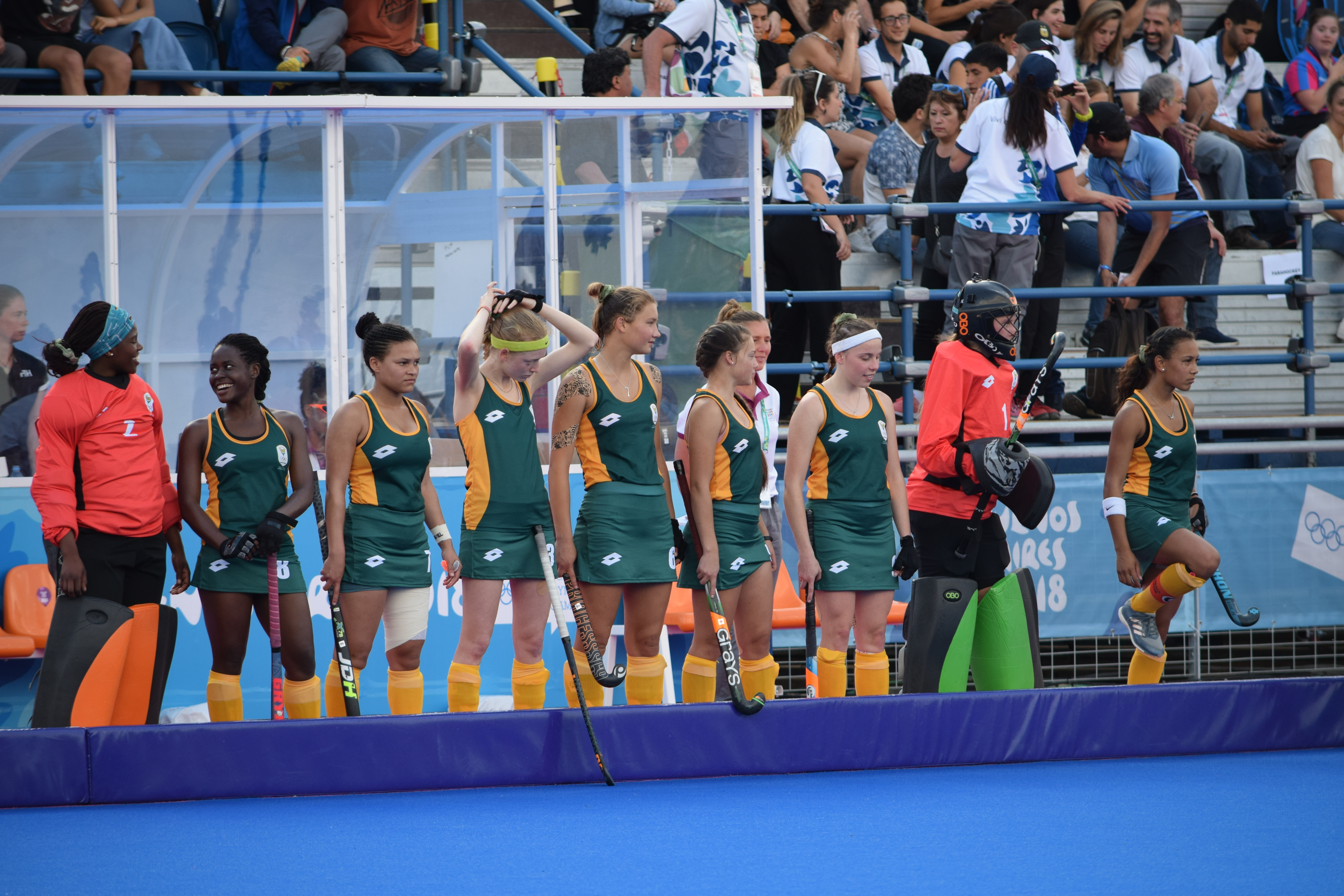
Semi-finals of Hockey5s, during the 2018 Youth Olympic Games in Buenos Aires. RSA - AGR

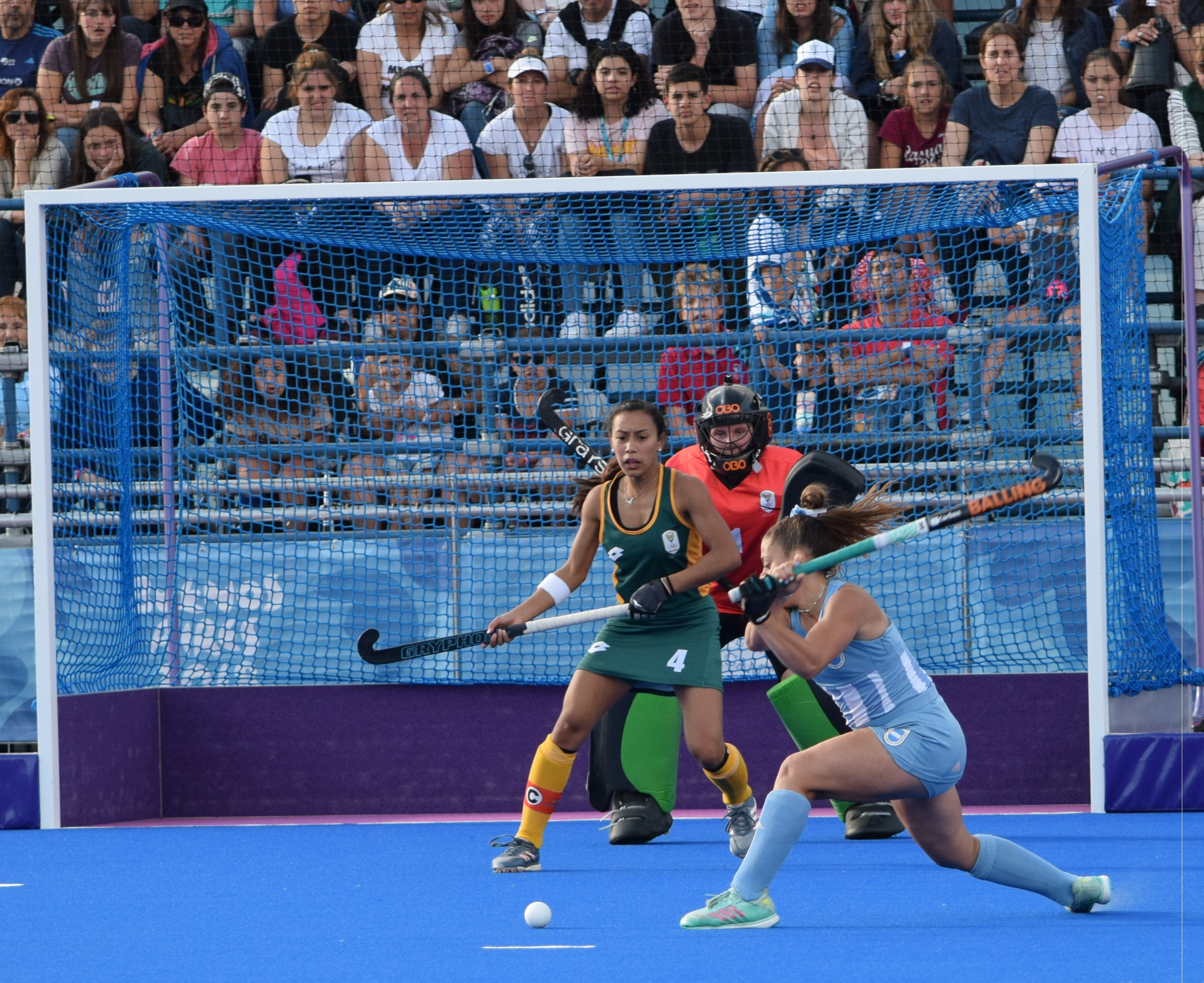
Amaarah Hendricks (C) and Mishka Ellis (GK) cover is goal.

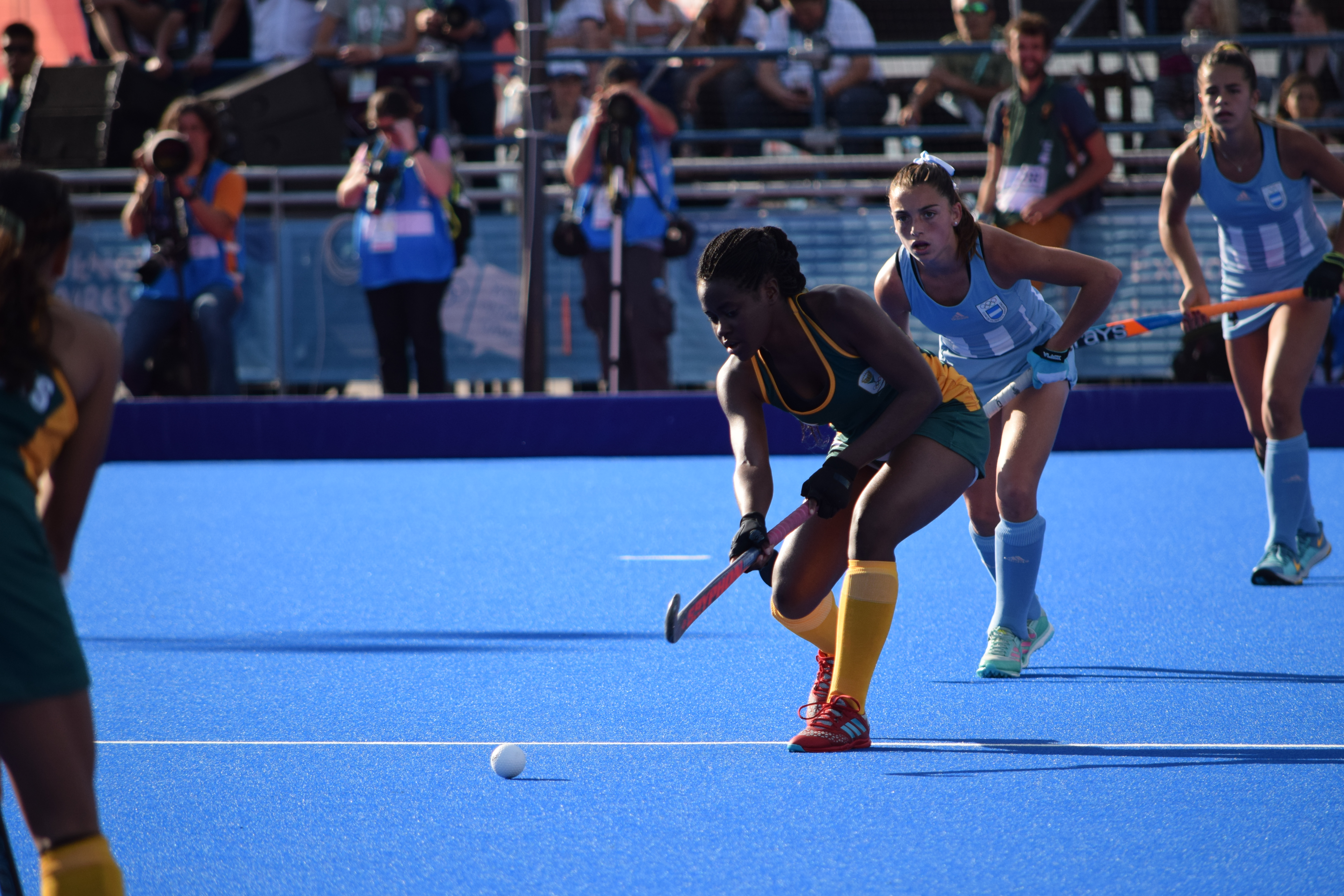
Angel Nkosi

== See also ==
- South Africa men's national under-18 field hockey team
- South Africa women's national field hockey team
- South Africa women's national under-21 field hockey team
