= South Africa women's national field hockey team =

South Africa
- Association: South African Hockey Association
- Confederation: AfHF (Africa)
- Head Coach: Inky Zondi
- Assistant coach(es): Lenise Marais
- Manager: Tarryn McCreedy
- Captain: Edith Molikoe
- Most caps: Marsha Cox (330)
Home	Away

FIH ranking
- Current: 18 (23 September 2026)

Olympic Games
- Appearances: 6 (first in 2000)
- Best result: 9th (2004)

World Cup
- Appearances: 8 (first in 1998)
- Best result: 7th (1998)

Africa Cup of Nations
- Appearances: 8 (first in 1994)
- Best result: (gold) 1st (seven times)

African Games
- Appearances: 4 (first in 1995)
- Best result: (gold) 1st (1995, 1999, 2003)
Medal record
Event	1st	2nd	3rd
Africa Cup of Nations	8	0	0
African Games	3	0	0
Total	11	0	0
Africa Cup of Nations
Gold medal – first place	1994 Pretoria	
Gold medal – first place	1998 Harare	
Gold medal – first place	2005 Pretoria	
Gold medal – first place	2009 Accra	
Gold medal – first place	2013 Nairobi	
Gold medal – first place	2017 Ismailia	
Gold medal – first place	2022 Accra	
Gold medal – first place	2025 Ismailia	
African Games
Gold medal – first place	1995 Harare	Team
Gold medal – first place	1999 Johannesburg	Team
Gold medal – first place	2003 Abuja	Team

The South Africa women's national field hockey team represents South Africa in international field hockey matches and tournaments.

== Tournament history ==
=== Summer Olympics ===
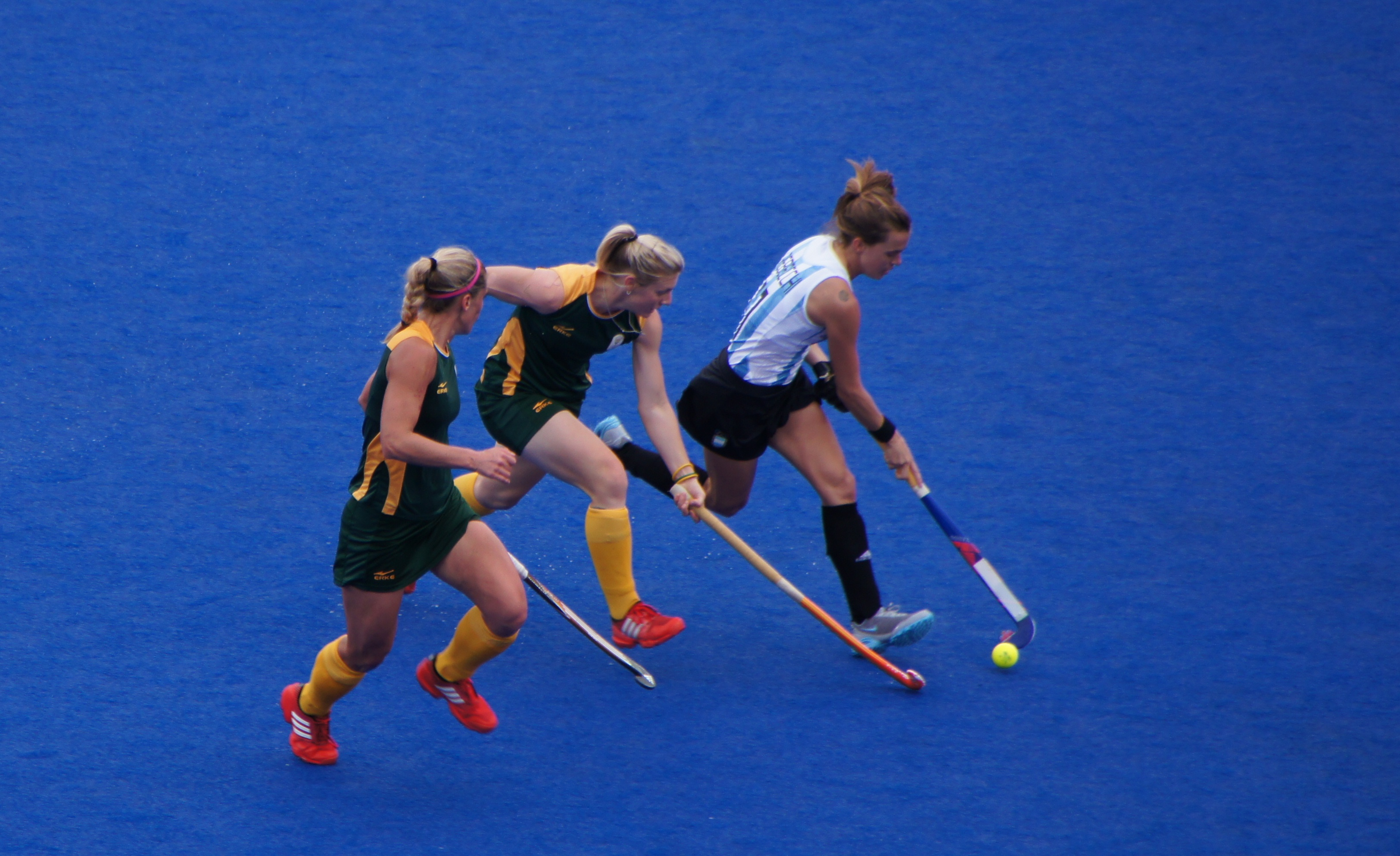
South Africa at the 2012 Olympics v Argentina

Summer Olympics record
Year	Round	Position	Pld	W	D	L	GF	GA	Squad
1980–1991	Banned (Note: South Africa was banned from international Hockey from 1964 onwards. South Africa was allowed to take part in international competitions from 1993 onwards.)								
(South Korea) 1992	did not qualify								
(United States) 1996	did not qualify								
(Australia) 2000	Group stage	10th	6	1	1	4	6	11	Squad
(Greece) 2004	Group stage	9th	5	2	0	3	9	15	Squad
(China) 2008	Group stage	11th	6	1	0	5	6	19	Squad
(United Kingdom) 2012	Group stage	11th	6	1	0	5	10	16	Squad
(Brazil) 2016	— (Note: South Africa won the continental qualifier however the team did not participate in the 2016 Olympics. South African Sports Confederation and Olympic Committee (SASCOC) and South African Hockey Association (SAHA) made an agreement on the Rio 2016 Olympics qualification criteria that the Continental Qualification route would not be considered. As a result, Spain, as the highest-ranked team from the 2014–15 Hockey World League Semifinals not already qualified, participated instead.)								
(Japan) 2020	Group stage	12th	5	0	0	5	5	19	Squad
(France) 2024	Group stage	11th	5	0	0	5	4	10	Squad
Total	6/11	0 titles	33	5	1	27	40	90	–

=== World Cup ===
FIH World Cup record
Year	Round	Position	Pld	W	D*	L	GF	GA	Squad
1974–1993	Banned								
(Netherlands) 1998	Group stage	7th place	7	2	1	4	12	17	Squad
(Australia) 2002	Group stage	13th place	9	3	2	4	17	19	Squad
(Spain) 2006	Group stage	12th place	6	0	2	4	3	13	Squad
(Argentina) 2010	Group stage	10th place	6	1	0	5	11	20	Squad
(Netherlands) 2014	Group stage	9th place	6	2	0	4	13	16	Squad
(England) 2018	Group stage	15th place	3	0	1	2	3	11	Squad
(Netherlands) / (Spain) 2022	Second round	15th place	5	0	1	4	5	11	Squad
(Belgium) / (Netherlands) 2026	Group stage	14th place	6	1	1	4	6	19	Squad
Total	8/16	0 titles	48	9	8	31	70	126	–

=== Commonwealth Games ===
Commonwealth Games
Year	Round	Position	Pld	W	D*	L	GF	GA
1998; Kuala Lumpur, Malaysia	Group stage	5th	5	3	1	1	21	5
2002; Manchester, England	Second round	5th	5	3	0	2	23	12
2006; Melbourne, Australia	Group stage	8th	5	2	1	2	12	10
2010; New Delhi, India	Semifinal	4th	6	2	1	3	16	7
2014; Glasgow, Scotland	Semifinal	4th	6	3	0	3	25	16
2018; Gold Coast, Australia	Group stage	6th	5	1	1	3	4	7
2022; Birmingham, England	Group stage	7th	5	2	0	3	19	13
Total	-	0 titles	37	16	4	17	120	70

=== Africa Cup of Nations ===
Africa Cup of Nations
Year	Host city	Position
1990	Harare, Zimbabwe	Banned
1994	Pretoria, South Africa	1st
1998	Harare, Zimbabwe	1st
2005	Pretoria, South Africa	1st
2009	Accra, Ghana	1st
2013	Nairobi, Kenya	1st
2017	Ismailia, Egypt	1st
2022	Accra, Ghana	1st
2025	Ismailia, Egypt	1st

=== All-Africa Games ===
Africa Games
All-Africa Games
Year	Host city	Position
1987	Nairobi, Kenya	Banned
1991	Cairo, Egypt	Banned
1995	Harare, Zimbabwe	1st
1999	Johannesburg, South Africa	1st
2003	Abuja, Nigeria	1st
Africa Games
Year	Host city	Position
2023	Accra, Ghana	Withdrew

=== African Olympic Qualifier ===
Africa Games
Year	Host city	Position
2007	Nairobi, Kenya	1st
2011	Bulawayo, Zimbabwe	1st
2015	Randburg, South Africa	1st
2019	Stellenbosch, South Africa	1st
2023	Pretoria, South Africa	1st

=== World League ===
- 2012–13 – 12th place
- 2014–15 – 14th place
- 2016–17 – 10th place

=== Hockey Nations Cup ===
Hockey Nations Cup
Year	Host city	Position
2022	Valencia, Spain	8th

=== Hockey Nations Cup 2 ===
Hockey Nations Cup 2
Year	Host city	Position
2024-25	Walcz, Poland	8th

=== Champions Trophy ===
- 2000 – 5th place

=== Champions Challenge ===
Champions Challenge
Year	Host city	Position
2002	Johannesburg, South Africa	4th
2003	Catania, Italy	–
2005	Virginia Beach, United States	2nd
2007	Baku, Azerbaijan	–
2009	Cape Town, South Africa	2nd
2011	(Republic of Ireland) Dublin, Ireland	5th
2012	(Republic of Ireland) Dublin, Ireland	6th
2014	Glasgow, Scotland	3rd

== Current squad ==
The following players were named in the squad ahead of the 2026 FIH World Cup in Amsterdam and Wavre.

No.	Pos.	Player	Date of birth (age)	Caps	Goals	Club
1	GK	Morgan de Jager	27 January 2003 (age 23)	12	0	(South Africa) Southern Gauteng
31	GK	Marlise van Tonder	5 June 1997 (age 29)	48	0	(South Africa) Western Province
4	DF	Stephanie Botha	30 December 1998 (age 27)	53	2	(South Africa) Western Province
5	DF	Edith Molikoe (C)	23 May 2000 (age 26)	57	0	(South Africa) Northern Blues
7	DF	Taheera Augousti	23 September 2005 (age 21)	43	4	(Netherlands) THC Hurley
14	DF	Lerato Mahole	29 December 1999 (age 26)	24	0	(South Africa) Northern Blues
18	DF	Hannah Pearce	17 November 1998 (age 27)	63	5	(South Africa) Southern Gauteng
23	DF	Jean-Leigh du Toit	18 January 2000 (age 26)	48	14	(South Africa) Northern Blues
8	MF	Ané Janse van Vuuren	20 March 2004 (age 22)	9	0	(South Africa) North West
10	MF	Onthatile Zulu	14 March 2000 (age 26)	79	5	(South Africa) Western Province
13	MF	Paris-Gail Isaacs	25 August 2006 (age 20)	18	1	(South Africa) Southern Gauteng
16	MF	Baylee Engelke	18 July 2005 (age 21)	0	0	(South Africa) Northern Blues
25	MF	Nomsa Mzizi	8 July 2004 (age 22)	3	0	(South Africa) North West
9	FW	Shanna Mendonça	3 March 2003 (age 23)	8	0	(South Africa) Southern Gauteng
11	FW	Bianca Wood	20 February 2000 (age 26)	47	6	(South Africa) Southern Gauteng
12	FW	Ntsopa Mokoena	17 August 2004 (age 22)	49	11	(South Africa) Northern Blues
17	FW	Caylin Maree	21 May 2003 (age 23)	5	1	(South Africa) Western Province
21	FW	Ongeziwe Mali	21 May 1999 (age 27)	48	6	(South Africa) Western Province
26	FW	Cailynn den Bakker	9 May 2001 (age 25)	27	0	(South Africa) Northern Blues
27	FW	Kayla de Waal	11 June 2000 (age 26)	42	12	(South Africa) Western Province

== Results and fixtures ==
The following is a list of match results in the last 12 months, as well as any future matches that have been scheduled.

Win Draw Loss Fixture

=== 2026 ===
9 January 2026 Test Match 1	South Africa	5–0	Canada	Pretoria, South Africa
18:00	Zulu 27', 51'; De Waal 29'; Brisset 56'; Mokoena 60'	Report		Stadium: Hoërskool Menlopark

10 January 2026 Test Match 2	South Africa	0–0	Canada	Pretoria, South Africa
16:00		Report		Stadium: Hoërskool Menlopark

11 January 2026 Test Match 3	South Africa	2–0	Canada	Pretoria, South Africa
10:00	Mokoena 10'; Brisset 28'	Report		Stadium: Hoërskool Menlopark

16 January 2026 Test Match 4	South Africa	0–0	Canada	Pretoria, South Africa
18:00		Report		Stadium: Hoërskool Menlopark

17 January 2026 Test Match 5	South Africa	1–0	Canada	Pretoria, South Africa
10:00	C. Fourie 44'	Report		Stadium: Hoërskool Menlopark

20 July 2026 Test Match 1	South Africa	4–0	Namibia	Cape Town, South Africa
10:00	de Waal 13'; Pearce 15+', 36'; Mokoena 51'	Report

21 July 2026 Test Match 2	South Africa	2–0	Namibia	Cape Town, South Africa
17:00	Pearce 2' de Waal 33'	Report

23 July 2026 Test Match 3	South Africa	4–1	Namibia	Cape Town, South Africa
17:00	Pearce 2', 51'; Zulu 3'; Wood 5'	Report	Rix 59'

24 July 2026 Test Match 4	South Africa	4–0	Namibia	Cape Town, South Africa
14:00	Maree 15'; Mali 48'; Pearce 54' du Toit 58'	Report

2 August 2026 Test Match 1	Scotland	2–0	South Africa	Edinburgh, Scotland
15:00	McEwan 17'; Costello 57'	Report		Stadium: Peffermill Playing Fields, The University of Edinburgh

3 August 2026 Test Match 2	Scotland	2–3	South Africa	Edinburgh, Scotland
19:30	Watson 10'; Eadie 30'	Report	Mokoena 16', 54'; Mali 59'	Stadium: Peffermill Playing Fields, The University of Edinburgh

16 August 2026 World Cup Pool D	England	4–0	South Africa	Amstelveen, Netherlands
10:00	Bourne 10'; Howard 13'; Neal 30'; Hamilton 41'	Report		Stadium: Wagener Stadium

18 August 2026 World Cup Pool D	India	6–1	South Africa	Amstelveen, Netherlands
18:30	Toppo 11'; Navneet 17'; Pukhrambam 25'; Deepika 38'; Lalremsiami 44'; Rana 45'	Report	de Waal 55'	Stadium: Wagener Stadium

20 August 2026 World Cup Pool D	China	5–1	South Africa	Amstelveen, Netherlands
09:30	Zou 4', 58'; Zhong 25'; Yu 30'; Chen 46'	Report	Isaacs 25'	Stadium: Wagener Stadium

21 August 2026 World Cup Pool G	Japan	1–1	South Africa	Amstelveen, Netherlands
09:30	Murayama 52'	Report	Mokoena 51'	Stadium: Wagener Stadium

23 August 2026 World Cup Pool G	Chile	2–3	South Africa	Amstelveen, Netherlands
10:00	Arrieta 13'; Avelli 51'	Report	Molikoe 22'; Mokoena 35'; Maree 48'	Stadium: Wagener Stadium

27 August 2026 World Cup 13th place match	South Africa	0–1	Ireland	Amstelveen, Netherlands
09:30		Report	Carey 14'	Stadium: Wagener Stadium

== See also ==
- South Africa men's national field hockey team
- South Africa women's national under-21 field hockey team
- South Africa women's national under-18 field hockey team
