= Women's Hockey Africa Cup of Nations =

Field hockey tournament

- Most recent season or competition: 2025 Women's Hockey Africa Cup of Nations
- Formerly: Hockey African Cup for Nations
- Sport: Field hockey
- Founded: 1990; 36 years ago
- First season: 1990
- No. of teams: 8
- Continent: AfHF (Africa)
- Most recent champion: South Africa (7th title) (2025)
- Most titles: South Africa (7 titles)

The Women's Hockey Africa Cup of Nations is an international women's field hockey tournament governed by African Hockey Federation. The winning team becomes the champions of Africa and qualified for the FIH Hockey World Cup.

== Qualification ==
The top two highest-ranked teams in the FIH World Rankings qualify directly for the tournament while the other teams have to play in the regional qualifiers. The top two teams from each of the regional qualifiers qualify for the tournament. The three regions are Northeast Africa, Northwest Africa, and Central south Africa.

== Results ==
Year	Host	Final			Third place game			Number of teams
Year	Host	Winner	Score	Runner-up	Third place	Score	Fourth place	Number of teams
1990; Details	Harare, Zimbabwe	Zimbabwe	Round-robin	Namibia	Kenya	Round-robin	Zambia	5
1994; Details	Pretoria, South Africa	South Africa	Round-robin	Zimbabwe	Namibia	Round-robin	Botswana	4
1998; Details	Harare, Zimbabwe	South Africa	5–0	Kenya	Zimbabwe	Round-robin	Egypt	4
2005; Details	Pretoria, South Africa	South Africa	6–1	Ghana	Namibia	2–1 (a.e.t.)	Nigeria	4
2009; Details	Accra, Ghana	South Africa	5–1	Ghana	Nigeria	4–1	Egypt	4
2013; Details	Nairobi, Kenya	South Africa	3–2	Ghana	Kenya	11–0	Tanzania	4
2017; Details	Ismailia, Egypt	South Africa	4–0	Ghana	Nigeria	3–3 (2–1 s.o.)	Kenya	5
2022; Details	Accra, Ghana	South Africa	3–1	Ghana	Kenya	0–0 (3–1 s.o.)	Zimbabwe	8
2025; Details	Ismailia, Egypt	South Africa	4–0	Ghana	Kenya	1–0	Nigeria	5

=== Summary ===
Team	Winners	Runners-up	Third place	Fourth place
South Africa	8 (1994*, 1998, 2005*, 2009, 2013, 2017, 2022, 2025)			
Zimbabwe	1 (1990*)	1 (1994)	1 (1998*)	1 (2022)
Ghana		6 (2005, 2009*, 2013, 2017, 2022*, 2025)		
Kenya		1 (1998)	4 (1990, 2013*, 2022, 2025)	1 (2017)
Namibia		1 (1990)	2 (1994, 2005)	
Nigeria			2 (2009, 2017)	2 (2005, 2025)
Egypt				2 (1998, 2009)
Tanzania				1 (2013)
Zambia				1 (1990)
Botswana				1 (1994)

* = hosts

=== Team appearances ===
Team	(Zimbabwe) 1990	(South Africa) 1994	(Zimbabwe) 1998	(South Africa) 2005	(Ghana) 2009	(Kenya) 2013	(Egypt) 2017	(Ghana) 2022	(Egypt) 2025	Total
Botswana	–	4th	–	–	–	–	–	–	–	1
Egypt	–	–	4th	–	4th	–	5th	–	5th	4
Ghana	–	–	–	2nd	2nd	2nd	2nd	2nd	2nd	6
Kenya	3rd	–	2nd	–	–	3rd	4th	3rd	3rd	6
Malawi	5th	–	–	–	–	–	–	–	–	1
Namibia	2nd	3rd	–	3rd	–	–	–	6th	WD	4
Nigeria	–	–	–	4th	3rd	–	3rd	5th	4th	5
South Africa	–	1st	1st	1st	1st	1st	1st	1st	1st	8
Tanzania	–	–	–	–	–	4th	–	–	–	1
Uganda	–	–	–	–	–	–	–	8th	WD	1
Zambia	4th	–	–	–	–	–	WD	7th	WD	2
Zimbabwe	1st	2nd	3rd	–	–	–	–	4th	WD	4
Total	5	4	4	4	4	4	5	8	5	

== See also ==
- Field hockey at the African Games
- Men's Hockey Africa Cup of Nations
- Women's African Olympic Qualifier
