= Bansari Solanki =

Indian field hockey player

Personal information
- Born: 24 May 2001 (age 25) Surat, Gujarat, India

Sport
- Sport: Field hockey
- Position: Goalkeeper
Senior career
Years	Team	Caps	Goals
–	NCE Delhi	-	-
–	Income Tax	-	-
National team
Years	Team	Caps	Goals
2022–	India	4	(0)
2023–	India Hockey5s	7	(0)
Medal record
Women's field hockey hockey5s
Representing India
Asia Cup
Silver medal – second place	2025 Hangzhou
Hockey5s World Cup
Silver medal – second place	2024 Oman
Hockey5s Asia Cup
Gold medal – first place	2023 Salalah

Bansari Solanki (born 24 May 2001) is an Indian field hockey player and a member of the Indian national team. She is a goalkeeper and plays for Income Tax and Centre of Excellence in the domestic tournaments. She was part of the winning SG Pipers team in the Hero Hockey India league 2025–26.

== Early life and education ==
She is from Surat, Gujarat. Her father is an engineer. She started playing hockey in Class 8 and was a defender. When the school did not have a goalkeeper for a tournament, her school coach persuaded her to don the pads and she well. She was spotted by Dhanraj Pillay, who was then the executive director of the hockey programme at the Sports Authority of Gujarat. then she shifted to Vadodara. By 17 years, she moved to Delhi to train under Romeo James at the National Hockey Academy. She completed her bachelor's degree in Business Administration.

== Career ==
Solanki represented SG Pipers team in the 2025–26 Hockey India League. In the final match, she did well as a goalkeeper to help Pipers lift their maiden league title. She won the best goalkeeper of the tournament award. During the league she was coached by former Indian goalkeeper Helen Mary.

She first played for Senior India Hockey5s team in August 2023 when they won the gold medal in the Hockey5s Asia Cup at Salalah in Oman. She was declared as the 'Best Rising Goalkeeper' of the event. Then in January 2024, she represented India which won a silver medal in the 2024 Women's FIH Hockey5s World Cup in Muscat. She also made her debut for the Senior India team, playing in the 2024–25 Women's FIH Pro League.

In 2025, she travelled for the Asia Cup in Gongshu, China, but did not get to play any matches.

According to hockey historian K Arumugam, she is the first female hockey player from Gujarat to play for India.
