= Mahima Choudhary =

Indian hockey player

Personal information
- Born: Mahima Choudhary; 6 December 1999 (age 26) Kalsi, Uttar Pradesh, India

Sport
- Sport: Field hockey
- Position: Midfielder
Youth career
- Years: Team
- 2016–: India U18
Senior career
Years	Team	Caps	Goals
–	Railway Sports Promotion Board	-	-
–	Indian Oil Corporation Ltd	-	-
2025–	Rarh Bengal Tigers	-	-
National team
Years	Team	Caps	Goals
–	India U21		-
2022–	India	5	(0)
2022–	India Hockey5s	15	(9)
Medal record
Women's field hockey
Representing India
Hockey5s World Cup
Silver medal – second place	2024 Oman
Hockey5s Asia Cup
Gold medal – first place	2023 Salalah
Girls' Asia Cup
Bronze medal – third place	2016 Bangkok

Mahima Choudhary (born 6 December 1999) is an Indian field hockey player and member of Indian women hockey team. She hails from Kalsi village in Uttar Pradesh. She plays for Indian Oil Corporation Limited in the domestic hockey tournaments. She plays as a defender.

== Early life ==
Mahima started playing in 2011. She played for four consecutive years in the Hockey India Sub-Junior National Championships before she got the National call for Junior India camp. Hailing from a Ror family from a small rural village, Kalsi in Uttar Pradesh, her family shifted to Sonipat, Haryana to help her play hockey.

== Hockey career ==
In 2015, she represented Haryana in the 5th Hockey India Junior National Championship at Chhattisgarh. She was part of the Indian girls team that won bronze at the 2016 Youth Asia Cup. In December 2021, she was named among the 60 probables for the India camp in Bengaluru to prepare for Women's Asia Cup 2022 in January. She was selected as the vice-captain for the nine-member Indian hockey5s team in May 2022 for the inaugural FIH Hockey 5s tournament held in Lausanne, Switzerland from 4 to 5 June. She scored the winning goal in the final of the inaugural women's Hockey 5s Asia Cup final to beat Thailand 7–2. It was the Asia's qualifying tournament for the Women's Hockey 5s World Cup that held in 2024.
