= Rajani Etimarpu =

Indian field hockey player (born 1990)

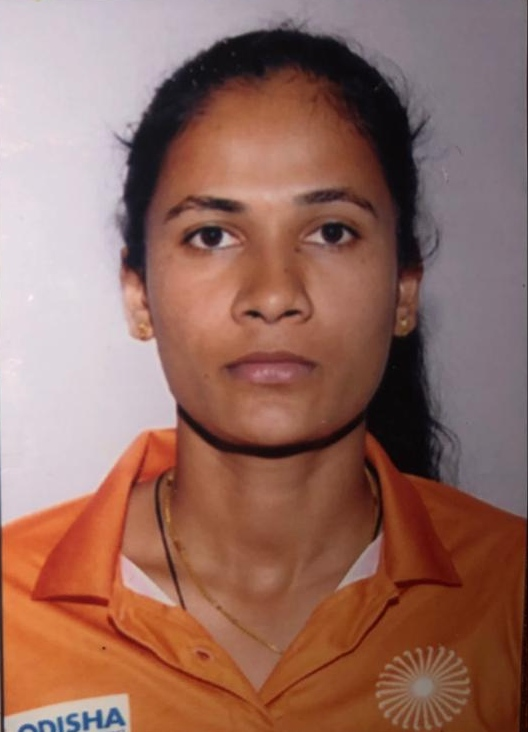

Personal information
- Born: 9 June 1990 (age 36) Tirupathi, Andhra Pradesh, India
- Height: 1.72 m (5 ft 8 in)
- Weight: 60 kg (132 lb)

Sport
- Sport: Field hockey
- Position: Goalkeeper
- Club: Railways
Senior career
Years	Team	Caps	Goals
2011–	Railways	-	-
National team
Years	Team	Caps	Goals
2009–	India	110	(0)
2022–	India Hockey5s	10	(0)
Medal record
Women's field hockey
Representing India
Asian Games
Silver medal – second place	2018 Jakarta	Team
Commonwealth Games
Bronze medal – third place	2022 Birmingham	Team
Hockey5s World Cup
Silver medal – second place	2024 Muscat
Asia Cup
Gold medal – first place	2017 Gifu
Bronze medal – third place	2013 Kuala Lumpur
Bronze medal – third place	2022 Muscat
Asian Champions Trophy
Gold medal – first place	2016 Singapore
Silver medal – second place	2013 Kakamigahara
Bronze medal – third place	2010 Busan

Rajani Etimarpu (born 9 June 1990) is an Indian field hockey player who plays as a goalkeeper for the Indian field hockey and hockey5s teams. She hails from Andhra Pradesh, India. In domestic competitions, she represents Railway Sports Promotion Board.

== Early life and education ==
Rajani hails from Enumulavaripalli village, Yerravaripalem mandal, Tirupati District, Andhra Pradesh. She did her schooling at Zilla Parishad High School in Nerabailu village. Initially, her parents were not interested in sending her to play hockey, but the Physical Education Teacher (PET) at her school convinced them. She began her journey in 2005 at the Sports Authority of Andhra Pradesh (SAAP) hostel in Tirupati. she learned the foundational skills of field hockey under the guidance of coaches at the center later moved to SAI hostel in Hyderabad. In 2007, she represented Andhra Pradesh in the Junior National Championship where AP reached quarterfinals. Her strong performance in the tournament helped her get a call to the National camp in 2008. Prasanna Kumar of Tirupati was the first to spot her and encouraged her to take up goalkeeping because of her height advantage.

== Hockey career ==
Although Rajani participated in the junior national camp held in Lucknow on three occasions and trained diligently, she was not selected to represent the team. While in Hyderabad for her examinations, she received information regarding open trials for the Senior India camp in Bengaluru. Motivated to pursue the opportunity, she attended the trials and secured selection for the camp, ultimately earning a place in the Indian national squad. She made her international debut in 2009 at a tournament held in New Zealand, competing against the host team. Rajani is one of the few Indian players who was part of the Indian team at the Olympics, World Cup, Commonwealth Games and Asian Games. She represented India at the 2016 Summer Olympics in Rio de Janeiro, where the Indian women's hockey team finished 12th. She was also a member of the Indian squad at the 2020 Summer Olympics in Tokyo, where India finished fourth. She was part of the Indian team at the XXI Commonwealth Games 2018 at Gold Coast, Australia. She was also part of the Indian team in two World Cups. They are the Vitality Hockey Women's World Cup 2018, London, and BDO FIH World Cup 2010, Rosario, Argentina. The highlight of her career is a silver medal at the 18th Asian Games 2018 in Jakarta, Indonesia. Earlier, she also played at the 2014–15 Women's FIH Hockey World League and the Hawke's Bay Cup 2015 held in New Zealand. At the 2013 Women's Asian Champions Trophy, Rajani Etimarpu showcased outstanding goalkeeping skills, earning the Best Goalkeeper award and helping India claim the silver medal. The team was additionally honored with the Fair Play Award.

== Rajani Leads Indian Women’s Hockey 5s Team to Silver at FIH World Cup 2024 ==
Rajani Etimarpu was named captain of the Indian hockey5s team for the inaugural FIH Hockey5s, held in Lausanne, Switzerland, from 4 to 5 June 2022. Under her leadership, India competed effectively in the tournament, with the team displaying coordinated play and tactical discipline.

She subsequently captained India at the 2024 FIH Hockey5s World Cup, held in Oman, where the team finished as runners-up and won the silver medal. The result represented one of India's strongest performances in the Hockey 5s format at the international level.

In the semifinal against the South Africa, Rajani made several critical saves that contributed to India's 6–3 victory and qualification for the final. During the final against the Netherlands, she faced sustained attacking pressure and recorded multiple important saves, including stopping a penalty stroke, as India secured the silver medal.

As of 2024, Rajani has earned 110 international caps representing India.

== Other activities ==
- Advisory Role: In 2021, she was appointed as a sports adviser for the Tirumala Tirupati Devasthanams (TTD).
- Sports Authority of Andhra Pradesh (SAAP): She first served as a SAAP board director from 2018 to 2020. She has once again been appointed by the Government of Andhra Pradesh in 2025 as part of the state's initiative to develop sports in Andhra Pradesh.
- Education Board: She also holds a position as a board member of Sri Padmavathi Mahila Viswa Vidyalayam.
- Brand ambassador: She is the brand ambassador of Tirupati smart city project and Swachh Survekshan programme.
