= Mariana Kujur =

Indian hockey player

Personal information
- Born: 24 April 1999 (age 27) Timna, Odisha, India

Sport
- Sport: Field hockey
- Position: Forward
- Club: Railway Sports Promotion Board
Youth career
- Years: Team
- 2016: India U18
Senior career
| Years | Team | Caps | Goals |
| – | Hockey Odisha | - | - |
| – | Railway Sports Promotion Board | - | - |
National team
| Years | Team | Caps | Goals |
| 2019 | India U21 | 8 | (0) |
| 2021– | India | 8 | (1) |
| 2022– | India Hockey5s | 15 | (13) |
Medal record
Women's field hockey
Representing India
Asia Cup
| Bronze medal – third place | 2022 Muscat |
Hockey5s World Cup
| Silver medal – second place | 2024 Oman |
Hockey5s Asia Cup
| Gold medal – first place | 2023 Salalah |
Girls' Asia Cup
| Bronze medal – third place | 2016 Bangkok |

Mariana Kujur (born 24 April 1999) is an Indian field hockey player and a member of the Indian women's hockey team. She plays for the Railway Sports Promotion Board in the domestic hockey tournaments. Kujur plays as a defender.

== Early life ==
Mariana Kujur hails from Timna village in Sundergarh district, Odisha. She has two brothers and two sisters and she is the youngest in the family. Both her brothers used to play hockey for relaxation but when Kujur moved to her uncle's house for studies, she joined for hockey under her cousin. She is a product of Panposh Sports Hostel and one of her first coaches who taught her basics when she joined in 2010 was Amulyananda Bihari.

== Hockey career ==
She made her youth India debut in December 2016 at the 4th under-18 Women's Asia Cup tournament held in Bangkok, Thailand where India got a bronze medal. In July 2018, she was part of the silver medal-winning India junior team at the 6-Nation under-23 women's hockey tournament in Antwerp, Belgium. In April 2019, she took part in the under-21 4 Nations junior women invitational tournament in Dublin. Later she was part of the gold medal-winning Indian team in the under-21 3-Nations Invitation Tournament in Canberra, in December 2019. She made her senior India debut in December 2021 at the Donghae Asian Champions Trophy and also took part in the Asia Cup in January 2022. She took part in the Women's FIH Hockey Pro League in June 2022. She also made her senior hockey5s debut at the Hero 2022 Women's FIH Hockey5s, Lausanne tournament in June 2022 and the 2023 Women's Hockey5s Asia Cup in Salalah, Oman.
