= Akshata Dhekale =

Indian field hockey player (born 2001)

Personal information
- Born: Akshata Dhekale; 2 November 2001 (age 24) Satara, Maharashtra, India

Sport
- Sport: Field hockey
- Position: Defender
Senior career
Years	Team	Caps	Goals
–	Hockey Maharashtra	-	-
–	Indian Oil Corporation Ltd	-	-
2025–	Soorma Hockey Club	-	-
National team
Years	Team	Caps	Goals
2022	India U21	6	(0)
2022–	India	6	(0)
2023–	India Hockey5s	11	(4)
Medal record
Women's field hockey
Representing India
Hockey5s World Cup
Silver medal – second place	2024 Oman
Hockey5s Asia Cup
Gold medal – first place	2023 Salalah

Akshata Dhekale (born 2 November 2001) is an Indian field hockey player and member of Indian women's hockey team. She plays for Indian Oil Corporation Limited in the domestic hockey tournaments. She is a defender. She made her debut for Senior India in March 2022.

== Early life ==
Akshata Abaso hails from Satara, Maharashtra. She used to train at the Shiv Chhatrapati Sports Complex in Pune.in 2019.

== Hockey career ==
Akshata Abaso played for Maharashtra and captained the state team in 2019 at the Hockey India Junior Women's Nationals tournament in Kerala. After a good tournament, she was called for the Junior India camp. Akshata Abaso was part of the Indian team that took part in the 2021 Junior World Cup, Potchefstroom, South Africa where India finished fourth. Later in June 2022, she played both the matches against Germany at the FIH Hockey Pro League getting her first India cap at the senior level. A month later in July, she was part of the Indian team that took part in the 2022 World Cup in Spain and Netherlands. In August 2023, she also played the Hockey5s Asia Cup in Salalah, Oman.
