= Preeti Panchal =

Indian field hockey player (born 2002)

Personal information
- Born: 25 December 2002 (age 23) Sonipat, Haryana, India

Sport
- Sport: Field hockey
- Position: Defender
Senior career
Years	Team	Caps	Goals
–	Hockey Haryana	-	-
–	Railways	-	-
2025–	Soorma Hockey Club	-	-
National team
Years	Team	Caps	Goals
2019–2023	India U21	21	(0)
2022–	India Hockey5s	4	(0)
Medal record
Women's field hockey
Representing India
Junior Asia Cup
Gold medal – first place	2023 Japan

Preeti Panchal (born 25 December 2002) is an Indian field hockey player from Haryana. She plays for the Indian team as a defender. She plays for Railway Sports Promotion Board and Hockey Haryana in the domestic tournaments. She played for JSW Soorma Hockey Club, in the inaugural Hero Hockey India Women's League 2024.

== Early life and career ==
Preeti hails from Sonipat, Haryana. She started playing hockey in Class 6 just to escape from home and to be with friends. But she was hooked to the sport after joining the Pritam Siwach hockey academy in Sonipat. She suffered a career threatening injury in 2013 during a district competition and had to undergo surgery. When doctors doubted her playing hockey again, her father, a former wrestler, encouraged her. She came back after more than two years of recovery and rehab due to her hard work.

== Career ==
Preeti was the captain of the India colts team that won the 2023 Junior Asia Cup. She and her first coach Pritam Siwach were honoured at a local function in Sonipat after her return from the Junior Asia Cup. Earlier in 2022, she represented India in the Hero FIH Hockey 5s tournament at Lausanne.
