= Navjot Kaur (field hockey) =

Indian field hockey player

Personal information
- Born: 7 March 1995 (age 31) Kurukshetra, Haryana, India
- Height: 1.67 m (5 ft 6 in)
- Weight: 53 kg (117 lb)

Sport
- Sport: Field hockey
- Position: Forward
- Club: Railways
Youth career
- Years: Team
- 2011–: India U18
Senior career
Years	Team	Caps	Goals
–	Railways	-	-
National team
Years	Team	Caps	Goals
2012–2015	India U21	59	(0)
2013–2022	India	209	(18)
2023–	India Hockey5s	5	(7)
Medal record
Women's field hockey
Representing India
Asian Games
Silver medal – second place	2018 Jakarta	Team
Bronze medal – third place	2014 Incheon	Team
Asia Cup
Gold medal – first place	2017 Gifu
Bronze medal – third place	2022 Muscat
Asian Champions Trophy
Gold medal – first place	2016 Singapore
Silver medal – second place	2018 Donghae
FIH Nations Cup
Gold medal – first place	2022 Spain
Hockey5s Asia Cup
Gold medal – first place	2023 Salalah
Junior World Cup
Bronze medal – third place	2013 Mönchengladbach
Junior Asia Cup
Silver medal – second place	2012 Bangkok
Girls' Asia Cup
Bronze medal – third place	2011 Bangkok

Navjot Kaur (born 7 March 1995) is an Indian field hockey player. She was part of the Indian Women's Hockey team in the 2016 Summer Olympics.

== Early life ==
She was born in Kurukshetra, Haryana. Her father is a Mechanic and her mother is a home-maker. "They are fully aware what the Olympics mean and are eagerly awaiting the day when I will take the field in Rio”, said Navjot Kaur.

== Career ==
She was trained for hockey in Baldev Singh's academy in Shahbad. She was part of the national girls' team that won bronze at the 2011 Youth Asia Cup. In one of her first tournaments at the U-19 level, she was the top-scorer. She has participated in more than a 100 international matches, representing India. In 2012, Kaur entered the International world of Hockey, playing against New Zealand after proving her talent in various Junior Leagues such as 2012 Junior Asia Cup, International U-21 tournament in the Netherlands, etc.

When Kaur completed her 100th match, Md. Mushtaque Ahmad, the Secretary General of Hockey India, commented, “Navjot is a talented young player. She has proved her place in the team with several important performances and I congratulate her on completing her 100th international cap today. She has been an inspiration for young, budding players who are aspiring to take up hockey professionally."

Kaur belonged to the team that performed well at the Hockey World League Semifinals in 2015, which enabled India to enter Olympics. She also participated in the 17th Asian Games, 2016 Rio Olympics and the 4th Women's Asian Champions Trophy. She also played a role in India's campaign at the Women's Hockey World League Round 2 in Canada.

In the Asian World Cup, Navjot Kaur successfully scored five goals, not including the penalty shootouts. She netted two goals against Singapore, but none against Kazakhstan. She played vigorously and scored against Japan. She also netted a crucial goal against China again in the finals which was a game-changer as it was the only goal that was shot in the game and led the team to win 1–0. She said, "All the players were very excited as it was a big final against China. I did score the first goal, which was important as it helped us take the lead but the goal was a team effort."

She used to play as a midfielder but later she shifted to the forward line. According to Navjot, "My role hasn’t changed much because I was an attacking midfielder. But now I get more scoring opportunities.”

Not only was she the highest scorer among the forwards, but she was also selected as the Player of the Match in the final.

== Personal life ==
Her hobbies include music and painting.

Her inspirations include Jasjeet Kaur and Rani Rampal. Her favourite player is Jamie Dwyer, an Australian hockey player, who she met during the Olympics. She considers her father to be the biggest influence in her life. According to her, “He always supports me and is there for me.”

Kaur believes that corruption, casteism, and lack of education to all, are the main challenges that India is facing today.
