= Ajmina Kujur =

Indian hockey player

Personal information
- Full name: Ajmina Kujur
- Born: 9 December 2001 (age 24) Panposh, Sundergarh, Odisha, India

Sport
- Sport: Field hockey
- Position: Midfielder
Senior career
Years	Team	Caps	Goals
–	Hockey Association of Odisha	-	-
–	Indian Oil Corporation Ltd.	-	-
2025–	Soorma Hockey Club	-	-
National team
Years	Team	Caps	Goals
2019–2022	India U21	14	(0)
2022–	India Hockey5s	15	(7)
Medal record
Women's field hockey Hockey5s
Representing India
Hockey5s World Cup
Silver medal – second place	2024 Muscat
Hockey5s Asia Cup
Gold medal – first place	2023 Salalah

Ajmina Kujur (born 9 December 2001) is an Indian field hockey player from Odisha. She plays as a midfielder. She plays for Indian Oil Corporation in the domestic tournaments and for the Indian hockey5s team.

== Early life ==
Ajmina hails from Panposh, near Rourkela, in Sundergarh district. Her father Cyril Kujur, a Catholic Christian. She learnt her basics from her first coach Amulyananda Bihari.

== Career ==
Ajmina made her debut for India under-21 team in February 2019 at Lucknow against France. Then she played the 4 Nations Junior Women Invitational Tournament in Dublin in June 2019 and later played the 3 Nations Invitational Tournament in Canberra, Australia in December 2019. Her big moment came when she represented the country in the 2022 Junior World Cup in Potchefstroom, South Africa. Later, she also represented India in the hockey5s tournaments starting with Hero Hockey5s tournament in Lausanne in June 2022. Then she played in the Hockey5s Asia Cup in Salalah, Oman in August 2023. In January 2024, she was part of the Indian team at the inaugural FIH Hockey5s World Cup held in Muscat, Oman. She was also in the National Camp probables in October 2023.

== Cash award ==
Ajmina received an award of Rs.12,50,000 from Odisha government for playing for the Indian women's hockey team.
