= Rail =

Rail or rails may refer to:

== Rail transport ==
- Rail transport and related matters
- Railway track or railway lines, the running surface of a railway

== Arts and media ==
=== Film ===
- Rails (film), a 1929 Italian film by Mario Camerini
- Rail (1967 film), a film by Geoffrey Jones for British Transport Films
- Rail (2024 film), a Tamil-language film

=== Magazines ===
- Rail (magazine), a British rail transport periodical
- Rails (magazine), a former New Zealand based rail transport periodical

=== Other arts ===
- The Rails, a British folk-rock band
- Rail (theater) or batten, a pipe from which lighting, scenery, or curtains are hung

== Technology ==
- Rails framework or Ruby on Rails, a web application framework
- Rail system (firearms), a mounting system for firearm attachments
- Front engine dragster
- Runway alignment indicator lights, a configuration of an approach lighting system
- Rule Augmented Interconnect Layout, a specification for expressing guidelines for printed circuit boards; companion to the Input/output Buffer Information Specification

== Other uses ==
- Rail (bird), a family of birds
- Rail (name)
- Rail, Missouri, a ghost town in the United States
- Rail drink, an alcoholic beverage ordered with house liquors
- Rural Appalachian Improvement League, an American non-profit organisation
- Rail, a line of cocaine

== See also ==
- Curtain rail, a rail from which curtains are hung
- Door rails, a horizontal outside member on a door or in a frame and panel construction
- Clothes rail, a railing for hanging clothes
- Guard rail, for protective separation
- Hand rail, for physical support, such as on stairways and steps
- Picatinny rail, a bracket used on some firearms as a mounting platform
- Power supply rail or voltage rail, a single voltage provided by a power supply unit
- Rail profile, the cross sectional shape of a railway rail
- Railing (disambiguation)
- Railway (disambiguation)
- Railways (disambiguation)
- Rayl (disambiguation)
- Riding a rail or being "run out of town on a rail"
- Third rail, a method of providing electric power to a railway train
