= Jyoti Rumavat =

Indian field hockey player (born 1999)

Personal information
- Born: 11 December 1999 (age 26) Sonipat, Haryana, India

Sport
- Sport: Field hockey
- Position: Forward
Youth career
- Years: Team
- 2016: India U18
Senior career
| Years | Team | Caps | Goals |
| – | Hockey Haryana | - | - |
| – | Indian Oil Corporation Ltd | - | - |
| 2025– | Soorma Hockey Club | - | - |
National team
| Years | Team | Caps | Goals |
| 2016 | India U21 | 4 | (1) |
| 2019– | India | 116 | (8) |
| 2023– | India Hockey5s | 5 | (5) |
Medal record
Women's field hockey
Representing India
Asian Games
| Gold medal – first place | 2026 Aichi–Nagoya | Team |
Commonwealth Games
| Bronze medal – third place | 2022 Birmingham | Team |
Asia Cup
| Silver medal – second place | 2025 Hangzhou |
| Bronze medal – third place | 2022 Muscat |
Asian Champions Trophy
| Gold medal – first place | 2023 Ranchi |
| Gold medal – first place | 2024 Rajgir |
Hockey5s Asia Cup
| Gold medal – first place | 2023 Salalah |
FIH Nations Cup
| Gold medal – first place | 2022 Spain |
Girls' Asia Cup
| Bronze medal – third place | 2016 Bangkok |

Jyoti Rumavat (born 11 December 1999) is an Indian field hockey player from Haryana. She plays as a forward for the national team. Rumavat plats for Soorma Hockey Club in Hockey India League. She was a part of the squad at the 2022 Women's Hockey Asia Cup which won the bronze medal.

== Early life and career ==
Rumavat is from Sonipat, Haryana. She made her senior India debut in 2019. She played for India in the 2021–22 Women's FIH Pro League where India won the bronze medal. She also played for India in the 2023–24 Women's FIH Pro League. She was also part of the Indian team that won the bronze medal in the 2022 Commonwealth Games held at Birmingham, England. In the same year, she played the 2022 World Cup held in Spain and Netherlands, where India finished ninth. In 2022, she also represented India which won the bronze medal in the Asia Cup in Muscat.

In 2023, she was part of the Indian team that won the gold medal in the Hockey5s Asia Cup at Salalah. She was also part of the Indian team that won gold medal in the Jharkhand Asian Champions Trophy Ranchi in 2023 and the Rajgir Asian Champions Trophy in 2024.
