= Soorma Hockey Club =

Punjab and Haryana based field hockey franchise team

- Full name: Soorma Hockey Club
- Nickname(s): Soormas
- Short name: Soorma HC
- League: Hockey India League
- Founded: 2024
- Colors

Personnel
- Captain: Harmanpreet Singh; Salima Tete; Savita Punia
- Coach: Philippe Goldberg; Jude Menezes
- Mentor: Sardar Singh; Rani Rampal
- Owner: JSW Sports
- Chairman: Parth Jindal
- Website: Website

Performance
- Runners-up: 2025
Home	Away

Soorma Hockey Club is a professional field hockey franchise team based in Punjab and Haryana that competes in the Hockey India League. It is owned by JSW Sports. At the 2024–25 edition, the women's team was the runners-up while the men's was third.

Philippe Goldberg is the head coach and Sardar Singh is the mentor of the men's team. Jude Menezes is the head coach and Rani Rampal is the mentor of the women's team.

== Ownership ==
The Soorma Hockey Club is owned by JSW Sports of JSW Group. Parth Jindal is the managing director of the company. They also own other sports franchises such as the Pro Kabaddi League team Haryana Steelers, the Indian Super League team Bengaluru FC, the Indian Premier League team Delhi Capitals, the SA20 team Pretoria Capitals, and the International League team Dubai Capitals.

== Men's squad ==
=== 2024–25 ===
Player	Nationality
Goalkeepers
Vincent Vanasch	Belgium
Jashandeep Singh	India
Mohith H S	India
Defenders
Harmanpreet Singh (C)	India
Jeremy Hayward	Australia
Gurinder Singh	India
Nicolás Della Torre	Argentina
Sukhvinder Singh	India
Ashu Maurya	India
Pradip Mandal	India
Midfielders
Victor Wegnez	Belgium
Ankush	India
Harjeet Singh	India
Nicolas Poncelet	Belgium
Phil Roper	United Kingdom
Sunit Lakra	India
Prabhjot Singh	India
Forwards
Vivek Prasad	India
Nicolás Keenan	Argentina
Gurjant Singh	India
Harish Mutagar	India
Boris Burkhardt	Netherlands
Maninder Singh	India
Pawan Rajbhar	India
Coach
Jeroen Baart	Belgium

=== 2026 ===
Player	Nationality
Goalkeepers
Vincent Vanasch	Belgium
Mohith H S	India
Defenders
Harmanpreet Singh (C)	India
Jeremy Hayward	Australia
Sukhvinder Singh	India
Nicolás Della Torre	Argentina
Pradip Mandal	India
Nicolas Poncelet	Belgium
Gurinder Singh	India
Midfielders
Victor Wegnez	Belgium
Harjeet Singh	India
Maninder Singh	India
Vivek Prasad	India
Jeetpal	India
Forwards
Nicolás Keenan	Argentina
Dayaan Cassiem	South Africa
Gurjant Singh	India
Prabhjot Singh	India
Pawan Rajbhar	India
Akashdeep Singh	India
Coach
Philippe Goldberg	Belgium

== Women's squad ==
=== 2025 ===
Player	Nationality
Goalkeepers
Savita Punia (C)	India
Nidhi Phalswal	India
Natalia Salvador	Chile
Defenders
Jyoti Rumavat	India
Preeti Panchal	India
Penny Squibb	Australia
Sophie Hamilton	United Kingdom
Nikki Pradhan	India
Midfielders
Salima Tete (C)	India
Vaishnavi Phalke	India
Aishwarya Chavan	India
Maria Verschoor	Netherlands
Jimena Cedrés	Argentina
Hina Bano	India
Ajmina Kujur	India
Forwards
Deepika Soreng	India
Charlotte Stapenhorst	Germany
Sharmila Godara	India
Olivia Shannon	New Zealand
Charlotte Englebert	Belgium
Sonam	India
Akshata Dhekale	India
Upasana Ranjib	India
Amanpreet Kaur	India
Coach
Jude Menezes	India

=== 2026 ===
Player	Nationality
Goalkeepers
Savita Punia (C)	India
Nidhi Phalswal	India
Defenders
Penny Squibb	Australia
Jyoti Rumavat	India
Shihori Oikawa	Japan
Jyoti Chhatri	India
Midfielders
Salima Tete (C)	India
Ajmina Kujur	India
Vaishnavi Phalke	India
Hina Bano	India
Sarah Robertson	Scotland
Mahima Tete	India
Manuela Vilar del Valle	Uruguay
Baljeet Kaur	India
Nisha Warsi	India
Forwards
Jimena Cedrés	Argentina
María José Granatto	Argentina
Olivia Shannon	New Zealand
Sonam	India
Mumtaz Khan	India
Coach
Jude Menezes	India

== Personnel record ==
=== Current staff ===
Position	Team		Ref
Position	M	W	Ref
Coach	(Belgium) Philippe Goldberg	(India) Jude Menezes	
Mentor	(India) Sardar Singh	(India) Rani Rampal	

=== Coaches record ===
Coach	Team	Duration	Best Result	Ref
(Belgium) Jeroen Baart	M	2024–2025	Third (2024–25)	
(India) Jude Menezes	W	2025–present	Runners Up (2025)	
(Belgium) Philippe Goldberg	M	2026–present		

== Captaincy record ==
Player	Team	Duration	Best Result
(India) Harmanpreet Singh	M	2024–present	Third (2024–25)
(India) Savita Punia	W	2025–present	Runners Up (2025)
(India) Salima Tete	W	2025–present	Runners Up (2025)

== Player statistics ==
=== Men's team ===
Rank	Player	Nationality	Goals
1	Harmanpreet Singh	India	5
2	Gurjant Singh	India	4
3	Prabhjot Singh	India	3
4	Harjeet Singh	India	2
4	Nicolás Della Torre	Argentina	2
4	Maninder Singh	India	2
4	Jeremy Hayward	Australia	2
5	Harish Mutagar	India	1
5	Pawan Rajbhar	India	1
5	Nicolás Keenan	Argentina	1

Source: HIL

=== Women's team ===
Rank	Player	Nationality	Goals
1	Charlotte Englebert	Belgium	5
2	Sonam	India	4
3	Hina Bano	India	2
3	Penny Squibb	Australia	2
4	Olivia Shannon	New Zealand	1
4	Salima Tete	India	1
4	Charlotte Stapenhorst	Germany	1

Source: HIL

== Performance record ==
Season	Team	Standing	Result	Matches	Won	Draw	Lost	Shootout		Most Goals
Season	Team	Standing	Result	Matches	Won	Draw	Lost	W	L	Most Goals
2024–25	M	2/8	Third Place	12	5	4	3	3	1	Harmanpreet Singh
2024–25	W	1/4	Runners Up	7	4	1	2	0	1	Charlotte Englebert
2025–26	M									
2025–26	W									
Total	Runners Up x1, Third Place x1									

== See also ==
- Bengaluru FC
- Delhi Capitals
- Haryana Steelers
- Pretoria Capitals
- Dominence of Haryana in sports
