= Noor de Baat =

Dutch field hockey player

Personal information
- Full name: Noor Orpa de Baat
- Born: 4 October 2000 (age 26) Broek in Waterland, Netherlands

Sport
- Sport: Field hockey
- Position: Midfield
- Club: Amsterdam
National team
Years	Team	Caps	Goals
2018	Netherlands U–18	4	(1)
2019–2022	Netherlands U–21	11	(3)
2018–	Netherlands indoor	27	(8)
Medal record
Women's field hockey
Representing Netherlands
Hockey5s World Cup
Gold medal – first place	2024 Oman
FIH Junior World Cup
Gold medal – first place	2022 Potchefstroom
EuroHockey Junior Championship
Silver medal – second place	2019 Valencia
EuroHockey Youth Championship
Gold medal – first place	2018 Santander
Women's indoor hockey
Indoor World Cup
Gold medal – first place	2023 Pretoria

Noor Orpa de Baat (born 4 October 2000) is a Dutch field hockey player, who plays as a midfielder.

== Personal life ==
Noor de Baat was born and raised in Broek in Waterland, Netherlands.

== Career ==
=== Club hockey ===
In the Dutch Hoofdklasse, de Baat plays club hockey for SV Kampong and previously for Amsterdam.

=== National teams ===
==== Under–18 ====
In 2018, at the EuroHockey Youth Championship, de Baat was a member of the Netherlands U–18 team. During the tournament in Santander, de Baat scored once in the Dutch side's gold medal campaign.

==== Under–21 ====
De Baat made her debut for the Netherlands U–21 side in 2019 at the EuroHockey Junior Championship in Valencia. During the tournament, de Baat scored two goals, and helped the team to a silver medal finish, losing in the final to Spain on penalties.
