= Jyoti Chhatri =

Indian hockey player

Personal information
- Born: 8 March 2003 (age 23) Panposh, Odisha, India

Sport
- Sport: Field hockey
- Position: Midfielder
- Club: Odisha Naval Tata HHPC
Senior career
Years	Team	Caps	Goals
–	Hockey Association of Odisha	-	-
–	Odisha Naval Tata HHPC	-	-
2025–	Odisha Warriors	-	-
National team
Years	Team	Caps	Goals
2023	India U21	12	(1)
2023–	India	16	(0)
2024–	India Hockey5s	6	(2)
Medal record
Women's field hockey
Representing India
Hockey5s World Cup
Silver medal – second place	2024 Oman
Junior Asia Cup
Gold medal – first place	2023 Japan

Jyoti Chhatri (born 8 March 2003) is an Indian field hockey player and member of Indian women's hockey team. She hails from Panposh in Odisha. She is a product of Odisha Naval Tata Hockey High Performance Centre. She plays as a midfielder. She represented the junior Indian team in the 2023 Junior Asia Cup.

== Early life ==
Born to Bhim Singh Chhatri and Suman Singh Chhatri, Jyoti has two elder brothers, Santosh Kumar and Suraj Kumar. She did her matriculation at the Birsa Munda Vidhyapitha, Panposh, Rourkela and completed her Class 12 at the Hrushikesh Ray Mahavidyalaya, Rourkela. His brother Suraj Kumar, who was a National-level hockey goalkeeper, initiated her into hockey in 2014 and the same year she joined the Sports Hostel Panposh. His father works as a mason. He moved the family from Ranchi to Odisha and the family struggled to meet both ends meet. She joined the Panposh hostel where the food and accommodation are free and she can also train.

== Hockey career ==
- In 2014, Jyoti began playing hockey and joined Panposh Sports Hostel in Rourkela.
- Her first coaches at the hostel were Florencia Ekka and Amulyananda Bihari.
- In 2016, she won a gold medal with the Odisha team in the National School Games and followed it with another silver medal in the next edition in December.
- In the same year, they also secured a silver medal in a different national tournament.
- Jyoti participated in the 6th Sub-Junior Women National Hockey Championship in Rohtak in 2016.
- In 2017, she played for Hockey Gangpur-Odisha team at the 7th Sub-Junior Women National Hockey Championship.
- Jyoti captained the Hockey Gangpur-Odisha team that won bronze in the 8th Sub-Junior Women National Hockey Championship in 2018.
- She also won bronze in the 8th Hockey India Junior Women National Championship in 2018.
- She captained the U-17 Odisha hockey team to a bronze medal at the Khelo India Youth Games in January 2020.
- In 2021, she joined and led the Odisha Naval Tata Hockey High Performance Centre to a bronze medal at the Hockey India Junior Women Academy National Championship.
- Jyoti captained the Hockey Association of Odisha team to bronze at the 12th Hockey India Junior Women National Championship in 2022.
- She made her Junior India debut in June 2022, winning silver in the Uniphar U-23 Five-Nations Tournament in Dublin, Ireland.
- In April 2023, Jyoti was included in the Senior India camp at SAI, Bengaluru.
- In 2023, Jyoti earned her first Senior India cap against Germany and played matches against Germany and China during the tour.
- She was part of the gold medal-winning Indian team at the 2023 Junior Asia Cup in Japan in June 2023.
- In February 2023, she was also part of the Indian Junior team's successful tour of South Africa.
- On 12 August, she was selected for he final Asian Games camp.
