= Railway (disambiguation) =

A railway is a means of transport.

Railway, Railways or The Railway may also refer to:

== Arts and entertainment ==
- The Railway, an 1873 painting by Édouard Manet, also known as Gare Saint-Lazare
- The Railway (novel), a 2006 novel by Hamid Ismailov
- The Railway (poem), an 1864 poem by Nikolai Nekrasov
- Railways (film), a 2010 Japanese film
- The Railway: Keeping Britain On Track, a 2013 British TV documentary series
- The Railway Series, a British books series
- Railways Africa, a magazine covering rail transport in Africa and the Middle East
- Railways Illustrated, a British magazine
- "Railway", a 2024 song by Stray Kids from their mixtape Hop

== Hotels, pubs and clubs ==
- The Railway, Broadheath, a pub in Greater Manchester, England
- The Railway Hotel, Hua Hin, a hotel in Hua Hin, Thailand
- The Railway Hotel, Southend-on-Sea, a pub in Essex, England
- Railway Club, historic nightclub and music venue in Vancouver, Canada

== Sports ==
=== India ===
- Railways Cricket Association, see Railways Sports Promotion Board
- Railways cricket team, one of several types of sports teams in India referred to as Indian Railways
- Railways football team, a football (soccer) team in India
- Railways Sports Promotion Board, a sports governing body in India

=== Elsewhere ===
- Railways Football Club, a modern Albany (Western Australia) sports team
- Railways Football Club, an Australian sports league established 1896, see Goldfields Football League
- Railways Ground, a stadium in Pakistan
- Railways Stadium, the former name of Godfrey 'Ucar' Chitalu 107 Stadium in Zambia
- Railway, informal name for a team in the Railway Union Sports Club, Dublin, Ireland

== See also ==
- Rail (disambiguation)
- Railroad (disambiguation) (a railway in United States English)
- British Rail, originally named British Railways
- Railways UK, see Rail transport in the United Kingdom
- Railways Minister (India), see Minister of Railways (India)
- Railways Board, the Indian Railway Board, see Indian Railways
- Train wreck, a railway disaster
- Rail transport in China
- Railways of Greece, re rail transport in Greece
- Railways Act, laws relating to railways
