= Rale =

Rale may refer to:

== People ==
- Matias Rale – Finnish footballer (born 2001)
- Mihai Rale – Romanian social scientist, journalist and politician (1896–1964)
- Rale Damjanović – Serbian radio journalist and writer
- Rale Micic – Serbian jazz guitarist and composer (born 1975)
- Rale Rasic – Australian footballer and manager (1935–2023)
- Sébastien Rale – French Jesuit missionary (1657–1724)

== Music ==
- Rale, musical instrument; see List of Caribbean membranophones
- Ralé-poussé – Musical instrument (diatonic accordion) of Réunion

== Other uses ==
- Rales, lung sounds
- RALE (RSSI-with-Angle-based Localization Estimation), a method for measuring the power of a received radio signal

== See also ==
- Rail (disambiguation)
- Rayl (disambiguation)
