= Rashmita Minz =

Indian hockey player (born 1997)

Personal information
- Born: Rashmita Minz; 16 December 1997 (age 28) Bankodhara, Deogarh, Odisha, India

Sport
- Sport: Field hockey
- Position: Defender
- Club: Indian Oil Corporation Ltd
Senior career
Years	Team	Caps	Goals
–	Indian Oil Corporation Ltd	-	-
National team
Years	Team	Caps	Goals
2015–2016	India U21	14	(0)
2016–	India	13	(0)
2022–	India Hockey5s	4	(1)
Medal record
Women's field hockey
Representing India
Asia Cup
Gold medal – first place	2017 Gifu	Team

Rashmita Minz (born 16 December 1997) is an Indian field hockey player from Odisha and member of Indian women hockey team. In March 2022, Indian Oil Corporation Limited recruited her along with eight other players. She plays as a defender.

== Early life ==
Minz hails from an Oraon family in Deogarh district, Odisha. Her father Nicholas Minz joined her in the Panposh sports hostel and she trained under coaches Pradeep Kumar Sarangi and Amulyananda Bihari in her initial years.

== Career ==
Under chief coach Neil Hawgood, Rashmita Minz made her senior India debut in 2016 as an 18-year-old against the Australian team when India played three matches in Melbourne.

She made her junior India debut on 26 July 2015 at the Breda Invitational U21 tournament for women and played four matches at Breda, the Netherlands. Later, she represented the India at the 2015 Women's Hockey Junior Asia Cup at Changzhou, China in September where she played all the six games as a defender.

She went to Cape Town in March 2016 for the series against South Africa but did not make her senior debut as she sat on the bench. After another under 21 tournament in October 2016 at the 5 Nations Invitational Junior Women's event in Valencia, she got her senior cap on 27 November 2016 and played all the three Test matches in Melbourne, Australia.

From then onwards, she started playing regularly for the senior national women's team. She was part of the team that won Senior Asia Cup at Kakamigahara, Japan in November 2017. In April 2019, she played five Test matches against Malaysia in Kuala Lumpur. Later, she was selected to play the 2021–22 Women's FIH Pro League.

=== Hockey5s ===
In June 2022, she represented senior India hockey5s in the inaugural Hero FIH Hockey5s in Lausanne. She played four matches and scored one goal.
