= 2024 Women's FIH Hockey5s World Cup =

First edition of Women's Hockey5s World Cup

2024 Women's Hockey5s World Cup
Tournament details
- Host country: Oman
- City: Muscat
- Dates: 24–27 January
- Teams: 16 (from 5 confederations)
- Venue: 1

Final positions
- Champions: Netherlands (1st title)
- Runner-up: India
- Third place: Poland

Tournament statistics
- Matches played: 48
- Goals scored: 418 (8.71 per match)
- Top scorer: (Uruguay) Teresa Viana (19 goals)
- Best player: (Netherlands) Noor de Baat
- Best young player: (India) Deepika Soreng
- Best goalkeeper: (Poland) Marta Kucharska

The 2024 Hockey5s World Cup was the first edition of the FIH Women's Hockey5s World Cup, the quadrennial world championship for women's national hockey5s teams organized by the FIH. It was held from 24 to 27 January 2024, in Muscat, Oman.

The Netherlands won the final against India to claim the first gold medal.

== Qualification ==
The top three teams qualified in the five continental champions stated below:

=== Qualified teams ===
Dates	Event	Location	Quotas	Qualifier(s)
	Hosts	—N/a	1	Oman
28 June – 1 July 2023	European Hockey5s Qualifier	Walcz, Poland	3	Netherlands; Poland; Ukraine
10–14 July 2023	Oceania Cup	Gold Coast, Australia	3	Australia; New Zealand; Fiji
10–15 December 2022	African Hockey5s Qualifier	Ismailia, Egypt	3	Namibia; South Africa; Zambia
4–11 June 2023	Pan American Hockey5s Cup	Kingston, Jamaica	3	United States; Uruguay; Paraguay
25–28 August 2023	Asian Hockey5s Qualifier	Salalah, Oman	3	India; Thailand; Malaysia
Total			16	

== Draw ==
The draw was held on 3 September 2023.

== Preliminary round ==
All times are local (UTC+4).

=== Pool A ===
Pos	Team	Pld	W	D	L	GF	GA	GD	Pts	Qualification
1	Netherlands	3	3	0	0	45	2	+43	9	Medal round
2	Malaysia	3	1	1	1	14	14	0	4	Medal round
3	Fiji	3	1	1	1	8	20	−12	4	Classification round
4	Oman (H)	3	0	0	3	3	34	−31	0	Classification round

Source: FIH
Rules for classification: 1) points; 2) matches won; 3) goal difference; 4) goals for; 5) head-to-head result; 6) field goals for.
(H) Hosts

24 January 2024
09:40

Malaysia	10–0	Oman
Zati 10', 10', 21', 25'; Zafirah 11', 13', 27'; Qhairunisya 16', 30+'; Dian 22'	Report

Umpires:
Timothy Sheahan (AUS)
Ilaria Amorosini (ITA)

24 January 2024
10:30

Netherlands	14–1	Fiji
Van der Veldt 4', 17', 23'; De Baat 7', 20'; Van der Veerdonk 8'; Timmermans 15', 20', 25'; Van de Venne 17', 25'; De Haan 19', 28'; Kalse 30'	Report	Dutta 18'

Umpires:
Benjamin Messerli (SUI)
Ana Faias (POR)

24 January 2024
16:30

Malaysia	0–10	Netherlands
	Report	Kalse 8', 20'; Van der Veldt 11', 17'; De Haan 11'; Benninga 12', 28'; Van de Venne 15'; Van der Veerdonk 23'; De Baat 25'

Umpires:
Łukasz Zwierzchowski (POL)
Jonathan Altamirano (MEX)

24 January 2024
18:00

Fiji	3–2	Oman
Dutta 21'; Bukalidi 23'; Kumar 29'	Report	O. Al-Balushi 15'; Al-Farsi 26'

Umpires:
Kim Yoon-seon (KOR)
Natalia Lodeiro (URU)

25 January 2024
09:40

Netherlands	21–1	Oman
Benninga 6', 30'; Van der Veldt 6', 11', 12', 22', 25', 25', 27'; Kalse 10', 14', 23'; De Baat 10', 29', 29'; De Haan 13', 17'; Timmermans 14', 20'; Van de Venne 19', 28'	Report	Al-Saidi 18'

Umpires:
Michelle Farnill (AUS)
Darren Hubach (RSA)

25 January 2024
10:30

Fiji	4–4	Malaysia
Bukalidi 2'; Nautu 18'; Dutta 20'; Ravatu 24'	Report	Dian 15', 21'; Ellya 20'; Qhairunisya 23'

Umpires:
Bhagyashree Agarwal (IND)
Victoria Pazos (POR)

=== Pool B ===
Pos	Team	Pld	W	D	L	GF	GA	GD	Pts	Qualification
1	South Africa	3	3	0	0	21	6	+15	9	Medal round
2	Ukraine	3	2	0	1	17	9	+8	6	Medal round
3	Australia	3	1	0	2	9	14	−5	3	Classification round
4	Zambia	3	0	0	3	3	21	−18	0	Classification round

Source: FIH
Rules for classification: 1) points; 2) matches won; 3) goal difference; 4) goals for; 5) head-to-head result; 6) field goals for.

24 January 2024
08:00

Australia	3–6	Ukraine
Gilbar 25'; Koelmeyer 27'; Dooley 30'	Report	Tanchenko 6', 7', 30'; Shokalenko 10'; Rudychenko 21'; Movchan 29'

Umpires:
Benjamin Messerli (SUI)
Fatma Mahmoud (EGY)

24 January 2024
08:50

South Africa	9–1	Zambia
Marks 4', 9', 23'; Van Wyk 6', 26'; Phume 14', 25'; Chamberlain 17'; Simmons 18'	Report	Kalunga 11'

Umpires:
Nick Saunders (NZL)
Bhagyashree Agarwal (IND)

24 January 2024
14:40

Ukraine	9–0	Zambia
Leonova 1', 17', 18', 30'; Movchan 8'; Tanchenko 10'; Shyshyna 15'; Rudychenko 25', 27'	Report

Umpires:
Chor Ming Yeung (HKG)
Ana Faias (POR)

24 January 2024
15:40

South Africa	6–3	Australia
Chamberlain 3', 27'; Van Wyk 5', 19'; Phume 16'; Marks 23'	Report	Koelmeyer 7'; Zimmerman 29'; Dooley 30'

Umpires:
Maarten Boxma (NED)
Victoria Pazos (POR)

25 January 2024
08:00

Australia	3–2	Zambia
Zimmermann 3', 25'; Dooley 26'	Report	Nakombe 6'; Mudenda 29'

Umpires:
Łukasz Zwierzchowski (POL)
Ana Faias (POR)

25 January 2024
08:50

Ukraine	2–6	South Africa
Shokalenko 23', 25'	Report	Marks 8', 14'; Chamberlain 9', 16', 25'; De la Rey 9'

Umpires:
Nick Saunders (NZL)
Natalia Lodeiro (URU)

=== Pool C ===
Pos	Team	Pld	W	D	L	GF	GA	GD	Pts	Qualification
1	India	3	3	0	0	19	9	+10	9	Medal round
2	Poland	3	2	0	1	14	7	+7	6	Medal round
3	United States	3	1	0	2	10	13	−3	3	Classification round
4	Namibia	3	0	0	3	4	18	−14	0	Classification round

Source: FIH
Rules for classification: 1) points; 2) matches won; 3) goal difference; 4) goals for; 5) head-to-head result; 6) field goals for.

24 January 2024
11:20

India	5–4	Poland
Mumtaz 4', 14'; Deepika 6', 29'; Mariana 23'	Report	Kucharska 8'; Rybacha 10'; Sławińska 27'; Polewczak 29'

Umpires:
Nick Saunders (NZL)
Ilaria Amorosini (ITA)

24 January 2024
12:10

United States	6–1	Namibia
De Vries 7', 7', 9'; Croon 17'; Ramsey 21'; Gonzales 28'	Report	Myburgh 4'

Umpires:
Maarten Boxma (NED)
Fatma Mahmoud (EGY)

24 January 2024
18:50

Poland	5–1	Namibia
Katerla 2'; Sławińska 12', 13'; Rybacha 17'; Skoraszewska 29'	Report	Kruger 20'

Umpires:
Darren Hubach (RSA)
Victoria Pazos (POR)

24 January 2024
19:40

United States	3–7	India
Sumfest 4', 22'; Gonzales 14'	Report	Mahima 17'; Mariana 20', 22'; Deepika 23', 25'; Mumtaz 27'; Ajmina 29'

Umpires:
Michelle Farnill (AUS)
Natalia Lodeiro (URU)

25 January 2024
13:00

India	7–2	Namibia
Mahima 3', 19'; Deepika 4', 26'; Rutaja 22'; Akshata 23'; Ajmina 28'	Report	Kruger 18'; Coetzee 30'

Umpires:
Benjamin Messerli (SUI)
Timothy Sheahan (AUS)

25 January 2024
13:50

Poland	5–1	United States
Kucharska 7', 24'; Skoraszewska 8'; Katerla 16'; Sławińska 25'	Report	Gonzales 15'

Umpires:
Chor Ming Yeung (HKG)
Fatma Mahmoud (EGY)

=== Pool D ===
Pos	Team	Pld	W	D	L	GF	GA	GD	Pts	Qualification
1	Uruguay	3	3	0	0	27	3	+24	9	Medal round
2	New Zealand	3	2	0	1	7	10	−3	6	Medal round
3	Thailand	3	1	0	2	7	16	−9	3	Classification round
4	Paraguay	3	0	0	3	3	15	−12	0	Classification round

Source: FIH
Rules for classification: 1) points; 2) matches won; 3) goal difference; 4) goals for; 5) head-to-head result; 6) field goals for.

24 January 2024
13:00

New Zealand	4–3	Thailand
Hepi 8'; Makea 15', 18'; Cortesi 16'	Report	Kijpakdee 2'; Sanpoung 17', 29'

Umpires:
Łukasz Zwierzchowski (POL)
Bhagyashree Agarwal (IND)

24 January 2024
13:50

Uruguay	10–1	Paraguay
Viana 3', 8', 13', 22', 27'; Vilar 11', 17'; Curutchague 19'; Piazza 25', 30'	Report	Barreto 21'

Umpires:
Timothy Sheahan (AUS)
Michelle Farnill (AUS)

24 January 2024
20:30

Thailand	3–1	Paraguay
Inpa 6'; Aunjai 15'; Pasawat 29'	Report	Maciel 8'

Umpires:
Chor Ming Yeung (HKG)
Jonathan Altamirano (MEX)

24 January 2024
21:20

Uruguay	6–1	New Zealand
Curutchague 5', 27'; Vilar 7', 28'; Viana 10', 20'	Report	Pritchard 9'

Umpires:
Darren Hubach (RSA)
Kim Yoon-seon (KOR)

25 January 2024
11:20

New Zealand	2–1	Paraguay
Makea 19', 28'	Report	Catebra 12'

Umpires:
Ilaria Amorosini (ITA)
Maarten Boxma (NED)

25 January 2024
12:10

Thailand	1–11	Uruguay
Aunjai 18'	Report	Vilar 6', 17'; Viana 7', 8', 27', 30'; Piazza 11'; Alles 13'; Curutchague 20'; Peñalba 24'; Gómez 25'

Umpires:
Jonathan Altamirano (MEX)
Kim Yoon-seon (KOR)

== Classification round ==
=== Bracket ===
Quarter-finals
25 January
Fiji	6
Zambia	3
25 January
Thailand	2
Namibia	5
25 January
Australia	8
Oman	2
25 January
United States	3
Paraguay	0

Crossover
26 January
Fiji	3
Namibia	9
26 January
Australia	4
United States	8

Ninth place
27 January
Namibia	0
United States	2
Eleventh place
27 January
Fiji	3
Australia	8

=== Ninth to sixteenth place quarter-finals ===
25 January 2024
18:00

Fiji	6–3	Zambia
Dutta 3', 22', 25', 26'; Fabiano 10'; Kumar 11'	Report	Nakombe 2', 5', 7'

Umpires:
Chor Ming Yeung (HKG)
Maarten Boxma (NED)

25 January 2024
19:10

Thailand	2–5	Namibia
Aunjai 7'; Noo-Keaw 10'	Report	Kruger 2', 13'; Myburgh 5'; Kruger 14'; Ludwig 16'

Umpires:
Darren Hubach (RSA)
Benjamin Messerli (SUI)

25 January 2024
20:20

Australia	8–2	Oman
Berry 3'; Zimmerman 7', 8'; Golusin 11'; Koelmeyer 15', 22'; Moffat 21', 29'	Report	Al-Farsi 5'; Al-Saidi 29'

Umpires:
Łukasz Zwierzchowski (POL)
Nick Saunders (NZL)

25 January 2024
21:30

United States	3–0	Paraguay
De Vries 15', 29'; Clarke 18'	Report

Umpires:
Timothy Sheahan (AUS)
Jonathan Altamirano (MEX)

=== Thirteenth to sixteenth place classification ===
Crossover
26 January
Zambia	3
Thailand	9
26 January
Oman	3
Paraguay	6

Thirteenth place
27 January
Thailand	5
Paraguay	3
Fifteenth place
27 January
Zambia	11
Oman	3

==== Crossover ====
26 January 2024
12:40

Zambia	3–9	Thailand
Mutangama 6'; Mudenda 7'; Nakombe 29'	Report	Sanpoung 2', 3'; Noo-Keaw 8', 10', 16'; Pasawat 12'; Inpa 20'; Kijpakdee 21', 27'

Umpires:
Timothy Sheahan (AUS)
Łukasz Zwierzchowski (POL)

26 January 2024
13:50

Oman	3–6	Paraguay
Al-Farsi 14'; Al-Lamki 22'; Al-Saadi 25'	Report	Ruiz 6'; Pistilli 7'; Barreto 15', 22'; Catebra 15'; Lopez 17'

Umpires:
Maarten Boxma (NED)
Chor Ming Yeung (HKG)

==== Fifteenth and sixteenth place ====
27 January 2024
09:00

Zambia	11–3	Oman
Mudenda 1', 2', 22'; Nakombe 5', 12', 15', 21', 24', 25'; Mulenga 7'; Mvula 10'	Report	Al-Farsi 9', 27'; Al-Saidi 19'

Umpires:
Łukasz Zwierzchowski (POL)
Jonathan Altamirano (MEX)

==== Thirteenth and fourteenth place ====
27 January 2024
10:10

Thailand	5–3	Paraguay
Samanso 5'; Sanpoung 8'; Aunjai 22'; Inpa 26'; Piresram 29'	Report	Maciel 1'; Pistilli 23'; Ruiz 28'

Umpires:
Nick Saunders (NZL)
Benjamin Messerli (SUI)

=== Ninth to twelfth place classification ===
==== Crossover ====
26 January 2024
15:00

Fiji	3–9	Namibia
Dutta 16'; Kumar 24'; Bukalidi 27'	Report	Philander 3', 10', 16', 17'; Ludwig 11', 18', 25'; Myburgh 21'; Kruger 22'

Umpires:
Jonathan Altamirano (MEX)
Nick Saunders (NZL)

26 January 2024
16:10

Australia	4–8	United States
Moffat 7'; Gilbar 10', 26'; Golusin 24'	Report	Gonzales 2', 13', 17', 29'; Croon 10'; De Vries 18', 28'; Burnett 27'

Umpires:
Benjamin Messerli (SUI)
Darren Hubach (RSA)

==== Eleventh and twelfth place ====
27 January 2024
11:20

Fiji	3–8	Australia
Bukalidi 3'; Ravatu 7'; Kumar 19'	Report	Dooley 2', 4', 26'; Moffat 3'; Koelmeyer 11'; Berry 15'; Zimmerman 21', 22'

Umpires:
Ana Faias (POR)
Ilaria Amorosini (ITA)

==== Ninth and tenth place ====
27 January 2024
12:40

Namibia	0–2	United States
	Report	Clarke 6'; Burnett 24'

Umpires:
Bhagyashree Agarwal (IND)
Kim Yoon-seon (KOR)

== Medal round ==
=== Bracket ===
Quarter-finals
26 January
Netherlands	4
Ukraine	2
26 January
Uruguay	3
Poland	5
26 January
South Africa	6
Malaysia	4
26 January
India	11
New Zealand	1

Semi-finals
26 January
Netherlands	3
Poland	1
26 January
South Africa	3
India	6

Final
27 January
Netherlands	7
India	2
Third place
27 January
Poland	4
South Africa	2

=== Quarter-finals ===
26 January 2024
08:00

Netherlands	4–2	Ukraine
De Baat 1'; Benninga 8'; Van der Veldt 13'; Van der Veerdonk 17'	Report	Popova 13'; Shokalenko 15'

Umpires:
Ana Faias (POR)
Ilaria Amorosini (ITA)

26 January 2024
09:10

Uruguay	3–5	Poland
Viana 11'; Alles 22'; Vilar 26'	Report	Katerla 2', 5', 29'; Rybacha 10'; Balcerzak 14'

Umpires:
Victoria Pazos (PAR)
Michelle Farnill (AUS)

26 January 2024
10:20

South Africa	6–4	Malaysia
Phume 2', 15', 17'; Cilliers 25'; Marks 28', 30'	Report	Mat Isa 5'; Aziz 9'; Nazeri 10'; Mohd 14'

Umpires:
Kim Yoon-seon (KOR)
Bhagyashree Agarwal (IND)

26 January 2024
11:30

India	11–1	New Zealand
Deepika 2', 25', 29'; Rutaja 9', 22', 26', 28'; Mumtaz 10', 11'; Mariana 13', 14'	Report	Hepi 2'

Umpires:
Fatma Mahmoud (EGY)
Natalia Lodeiro (URU)

=== Fifth to eighth place classification ===
Crossover
26 January
Ukraine	3
Uruguay	5
26 January
Malaysia	5
New Zealand	3

Fifth place
27 January
Uruguay	8
Malaysia	4
Seventh place
27 January
Ukraine	6
New Zealand	0

==== Crossover ====
26 January 2024
18:00

Ukraine	3–5	Uruguay
Shokalenko 6'; Leonova 24', 30'	Report	Viana 7'; Vilar 10', 21', 30'; De Maria 16'

Umpires:
Michelle Farnill (AUS)
Ilaria Amorosini (ITA)

26 January 2024
19:10

Malaysia	5–3	New Zealand
Aziz 1', 25'; Ellias 5'; Nazeri 14'; Mat Isa 30'	Report	Hepi 4', 30'; Arthur-Worsop 26'

Umpires:
Ana Faias (POR)
Natalia Lodeiro (URU)

==== Seventh and eighth place ====
27 January 2024
13:50

Ukraine	6–0	New Zealand
Movchan 2'; Leonova 6', 11', 16', 27'; Tanchenko 26'	Report

Umpires:
Darren Hubach (RSA)
Chor Ming Yeung (HKG)

==== Fifth and sixth place ====
27 January 2024
18:00

Uruguay	8–4	Malaysia
Viana 1', 8', 16', 23', 24', 25'; Vilar 3'; Peñalba 20'	Report	Muhamad 4', 19'; Aziz 6'; Mat Isa 25'

Umpires:
Timothy Sheahan (AUS)
Maarten Boxma (NED)

=== First to fourth place classification ===
==== Semi-finals ====
26 January 2024
20:20

Netherlands	3–1	Poland
De Baat 11', 15'; Benninga 22'	Report	Katerla 6'

Umpires:
Kim Yoon-seon (KOR)
Bhagyashree Agarwal (IND)

26 January 2024
21:30

South Africa	3–6	India
De la Rey 5'; Marks 8'; Chamberlain 29'	Report	Akshata 7'; Mariana 11'; Mumtaz 21'; Rutaja 23'; Jyoti 25'; Ajmina 26'

Umpires:
Victoria Pazos (PAR)
Fatma Mahmoud (EGY)

==== Third and fourth place ====
27 January 2024
19:10

Poland	4–2	South Africa
Katerla 5', 8', 16', 18'	Report	Chamberlain 18'; Marks 24'

Umpires:
Natalia Lodeiro (URU)
Michelle Farnill (AUS)

==== Final ====
27 January 2024
20:20

Netherlands	7–2	India
Van de Venne 2', 14'; Van der Veldt 4', 8'; Kalse 11', 27'; Benninga 13'	Report	Jyoti 20'; Rutaja 23'

Umpires:
Victoria Pazos (PAR)
Fatma Mahmoud (EGY)

== Final standings ==
Rank	Team
1st place, gold medalist(s)	Netherlands
2nd place, silver medalist(s)	India
3rd place, bronze medalist(s)	Poland
4	South Africa
5	Uruguay
6	Malaysia
7	Ukraine
8	New Zealand
9	United States
10	Namibia
11	Australia
12	Fiji
13	Thailand
14	Paraguay
15	Zambia
16	Oman

=== Awards ===
The following awards were given at the conclusion of the tournament.

Award	Player
Best player	(Netherlands) Noor de Baat
Best goalkeeper	(Poland) Marta Kucharska
Best junior player	(India) Deepika Soreng

== Goalscorers ==
There were 418 goals scored in 48 matches, for an average of 8.71 goals per match.

19 goals

- (Uruguay) Teresa Viana

15 goals

- (Netherlands) Bente van der Veldt

11 goals

- (South Africa) Toni Marks
- (Uruguay) Manuela Vilar
- (Zambia) Carol Nakombe

10 goals

- (Poland) Amelia Katerla
- (Ukraine) Karyna Leonova

9 goals

- (India) Deepika Soreng
- (Netherlands) Noor de Baat

8 goals

- (Fiji) Tiara Dutta
- (Netherlands) Lana Kalse
- (South Africa) Dirkie Chamberlain

7 goals

- (Australia) Jamie Zimmerman
- (India) Rutuja Pisal
- (Malaysia) Zafirah Aziz
- (Netherlands) Sosha Benninga
- (Netherlands) Janneke van de Venne
- (United States) Linnea Gonzales
- (United States) Charlotte de Vries

6 goals

- (Australia) Madeline Dooley
- (India) Mumtaz Khan
- (India) Mariana Kujur
- (Malaysia) Zati Muhamad

5 goals

- (Australia) Dacia Koelmeyer
- (Malaysia) Dian Nazeri
- (Namibia) Jivanka Kruger
- (Netherlands) Floor de Haan
- (Netherlands) Marloes Timmermans
- (Oman) Buthaina Al-Farsi
- (South Africa) Reabetswe Phume
- (Thailand) Kornkanok Sanpoung
- (Ukraine) Kateryna Shokalenko
- (Ukraine) Anna Tanchenko
- (Zambia) Loveness Mudenda

4 goals

- (Australia) Jessica Moffat
- (Fiji) Lora Bukalidi
- (Fiji) Divyankar Kumar
- (Malaysia) Qhairunisya Mohd
- (Namibia) Sunelle Ludwig
- (Namibia) Azaylee Philander
- (New Zealand) Oriwa Hepi
- (New Zealand) Carissa Makea
- (Poland) Paula Sławińska
- (South Africa) Marguerite van Wyk
- (Thailand) Natthakarn Aunjai
- (Thailand) Sudarat Noo-Keaw
- (Uruguay) Lupe Curutchague

3 goals

- (Australia) Holly Gilbar
- (India) Mahima Choudhary
- (India) Ajmina Kujur
- (Malaysia) Safiqah Mat Isa
- (Namibia) Taramarie Myburgh
- (Netherlands) Danique van der Veerdonk
- (Oman) Maroa Al-Saidi
- (Paraguay) Mia Barreto
- (Poland) Julia Kucharska
- (Poland) Marlena Rybacha
- (Thailand) Kunjira Inpa
- (Thailand) Jenjira Kijpakdee
- (Ukraine) Veronika Movchan
- (Ukraine) Valeriia Rudychenko
- (Uruguay) Camila Piazza

2 goals

- (Australia) Sienna Berry
- (Australia) Eva Golusin
- (Fiji) Lala Ravatu
- (India) Akshata Dhekale
- (India) Jyoti Chhatri
- (Malaysia) Ellya Ellias
- (Paraguay) María Catebra
- (Paraguay) Vianca Maciel
- (Paraguay) Paula Pistilli
- (Paraguay) Lorena Ruiz
- (Poland) Daria Skoraszewska
- (South Africa) Teshawn de la Rey
- (Thailand) Songkran Pasawat
- (United States) Abigail Burnett
- (United States) Lora Clarke
- (United States) Jans Croon
- (United States) Jacqueline Sumfest
- (Uruguay) Agustina Alles
- (Uruguay) Florencia Peñalba

1 goal

- (Fiji) Catherine Fabiano
- (Fiji) Melba Nautu
- (Namibia) Anthea Coetzee
- (Namibia) Jahntwa Kruger
- (New Zealand) Leah Arthur-Worsop
- (New Zealand) Antonia Cortesi
- (New Zealand) Tulin Pritchard
- (Oman) Olaa Al-Balushi
- (Oman) Rasha Al-Lamki
- (Oman) Ahad Al-Saadi
- (Paraguay) Bella Lopez
- (Poland) Julia Balcerzak
- (Poland) Monika Polewczak
- (South Africa) Izelle Cilliers
- (South Africa) Shirndré-Lee Simmons
- (Thailand) Anongnat Piresram
- (Thailand) Supansa Samanso
- (Ukraine) Kateryna Popova
- (Ukraine) Anastasiia Shyshyna
- (United States) Caroline Ramsey
- (Uruguay) Magdalena Gómez
- (Uruguay) Camila de María
- (Zambia) Brenda Kalunga
- (Zambia) Ireen Mulenga
- (Zambia) Harriet Mutangama
- (Zambia) Annie Mvula

Source: FIH

== See also ==
- 2024 Men's Hockey5s World Cup
