= Railroad (disambiguation) =

A railroad is a means of transport.

Railroad or Rail Road may also refer to:

== Places ==
=== United States ===
- Railroad, Pennsylvania, a borough
- Railroad Township, Starke County, Indiana, a township
- Railroad Valley, in east-central Nevada
- Railroad Canyon, around some of the San Jacinto River in California
- Rail Road Flat, California, a census-designated place in Calaveras County

== Arts and media ==
- The Railroad (film), a 2006 South Korean film
- "The Railroad" (What We Do in the Shadows), a 2024 episode (S6 E4) of the TV series What We Do in the Shadows

=== Music ===
- Railroad (album), a 1983 album by guitarist John Fahey
- "Railroad" (song), 1970 Maurice Gibb song
- "Railroad", 1971 song by Status Quo from the album Dog of Two Head

== Other uses ==
- Railroad apartment, an apartment with rooms connecting to each other in a line

== See also ==
- Rail Rode, a 1927 short cartoon
- Rail-road vehicle, a vehicle for rail and road
- Railroad Tycoon (series), a business simulation game
  - Sid Meier's Railroads!, a business simulation computer game
- Rail (disambiguation)
- Railway (disambiguation) (a railroad in British and Commonwealth English)
- Railways (disambiguation)
