= Aishwarya Chavan =

Indian hockey player

Personal information
- Born: Aishwarya Chavan; 18 October 1997 (age 29) Maharashtra, India

Sport
- Sport: Field hockey
- Position: Forward
Senior career
Years	Team	Caps	Goals
–	Hockey Maharashtra	-	-
–	Hockey Madhya Pradesh	-	-
–	Railways	-	-
2025–	Soorma Hockey Club	-	-
National team
Years	Team	Caps	Goals
2022–	India	1	(0)

Aishwarya Chavan (born 18 October 1997) is an Indian field hockey player and member of Indian women hockey team. She hails from Maharashtra. She plays for Railway Sports Promotion Board in the domestic hockey tournaments. She plays as a forward.

== Hockey career ==
Aishwarya was part of the Maharashtra team which won the 13th Hockey India Senior Women National Championship 2023 in Kakinada, Andhra Pradesh. She scored the final goal in the final where they defeated Maharashtra 5–1.
