= Zaripov =

Zaripov (Cyrillic: Зарипов) is an Asian masculine surname, its feminine counterpart is Zaripova. The surname may refer to the following notable people:

- Amina Zaripova (born 1976), Russian rhythmic gymnast
- Danis Zaripov (born 1981), Russian ice hockey left winger
- Hakim Zaripov (1924–2023), Uzbek circus performer
- Irek Zaripov (born 1983), Russian biathlete and cross-country skier
- Kamila Zaripova (born 1998), Uzbekistani football midfielder
- Nizoramo Zaripova (1923–2024), Tajik-Soviet politician and women's rights advocate
- Rail Zaripov (born 1995), Russian football player
- Ramil Zaripov (born 1992), Russian football defender
- Rina Zaripova (1941–2008), Tatar journalist, translator and teacher
- Venera Zaripova (born 1966), Soviet rhythmic gymnast
- Yuliya Zaripova (born 1986), Russian middle-distance runner
