= 2018 Girls' EuroHockey Youth Championships =

Tournament details
- Host country: Spain
- City: Santander
- Dates: 15–21 July
- Teams: 8 (from 1 confederation)
- Venue: Ruth Beitia Sports Complex

Final positions
- Champions: Netherlands (8th title)
- Runner-up: Belgium
- Third place: England

Tournament statistics
- Matches played: 20
- Goals scored: 95 (4.75 per match)
- Top scorer: (Spain) Sara Barrios (7 goals)
- Best player: (Spain) Sara Barrios
- Best goalkeeper: (Belgium) Juliette Grignard

The 2018 Girls' EuroHockey Youth Championships was the 10th edition of the Girls' EuroHockey Youth Championships. It will be held from 15 to 21 July 2018 in Santander, Spain at the Ruth Beitia Sports Complex.

Five-time defending champions the Netherlands won a record-extending eighth title by defeating Belgium 5–0 in the final. England won the bronze medal by defeating Germany 2–1.

== Qualified teams ==
The following teams participated in the 2018 EuroHockey Youth Championship:

| Dates | Event | Location | Quotas | Qualifiers |
|---|---|---|---|---|
| 24–30 July 2016 | 2016 EuroHockey Youth Championship | Cork, Ireland | 5 | Belgium; England; Germany; Ireland; Netherlands; Spain |
| 24–30 July 2016 | 2016 EuroHockey Youth Championship II | Glasgow, Scotland | 2 | Belarus; France |
| Total | | | 8 | |

== Format ==
The eight teams were split into two groups of four teams. The top two teams advanced to the semi-finals to determine the winner in a knockout system. The bottom two teams played in a new group with the teams they did not play against in the group stage. The last two teams were relegated to the Youth Championship II.

== Preliminary round ==
All times are local (UTC+2).

=== Pool A ===
| Pos | Team | Pld | W | D | L | GF | GA | GD | Pts | Qualification |
|---|---|---|---|---|---|---|---|---|---|---|
| 1 | Netherlands | 3 | 3 | 0 | 0 | 14 | 0 | +14 | 9 | Semi-finals |
| 2 | Belgium | 3 | 2 | 0 | 1 | 8 | 6 | +2 | 6 | Semi-finals |
| 3 | Spain (H) | 3 | 1 | 0 | 2 | 9 | 9 | 0 | 3 | |
| 4 | France | 3 | 0 | 0 | 3 | 2 | 18 | −16 | 0 | |

Source: EHF
Rules for classification: 1) points; 2) goal difference; 3) goals scored; 4) head-to-head result.
(H) Hosts

15 July 2018
14:30

| Belgium | 4–1 | France |
|---|---|---|
| Van Dieren 33'; Blockmans 34'; Ballenghien 36', 49' | Report | Isoré 15' |

Umpires:
Rebecca Woodcock (ENG)
Volha Matusevich (BLR)

15 July 2018
17:45

| Netherlands | 4–0 | Spain |
|---|---|---|
| Van der Veldt 4'; Omrani 13'; Benninga 25'; De Baat 27' | Report |

Umpires:
Ilaria Amorosini (ITA)
Teresa Lipsky (GER)

17 July 2018
15:30

| Belgium | 0–2 | Netherlands |
|---|---|---|
| | Report | Van der Veerdonk 29'; Omrani 34' |

Umpires:
Rebecca Woodcock (ENG)
Teresa Lipsky (GER)

17 July 2018
17:45

| Spain | 6–1 | France |
|---|---|---|
| S. Barrios 9', 29', 37', 53'; Monslave 20'; Bosch 60' | Report | Van Bolhuis 50' |

Umpires:
Maartje de Bruijn (NED)
Ellie Duffy (IRE)

18 July 2018
15:30

| Netherlands | 8–0 | France |
|---|---|---|
| Van der Veldt 14', 36'; Tukkers 33', 39'; Fokke 51'; Benninga 56'; Rozemeijer 58'; Beetsma 59' | Report |

Umpires:
Ilaria Amorosini (ITA)
Ellie Duffy (IRE)

18 July 2018
17:45

| Spain | 3–4 | Belgium |
|---|---|---|
| Santacruz 26'; S. Barrios 44'; L. Barrios 47' | Report | Duquesne 14'; Blockmans 56'; Van Bauwel 36'; Englebert 44' |

Umpires:
Victoria Pazoz (ESP)
Teresa Lipsky (GER)

=== Pool B ===
| Pos | Team | Pld | W | D | L | GF | GA | GD | Pts | Qualification |
|---|---|---|---|---|---|---|---|---|---|---|
| 1 | Germany | 3 | 3 | 0 | 0 | 13 | 3 | +10 | 9 | Semi-finals |
| 2 | England | 3 | 2 | 0 | 1 | 9 | 3 | +6 | 6 | Semi-finals |
| 3 | Ireland | 3 | 1 | 0 | 2 | 4 | 7 | −3 | 3 | |
| 4 | Belarus | 3 | 0 | 0 | 3 | 2 | 15 | −13 | 0 | |

Source: EHF
Rules for classification: 1) points; 2) goal difference; 3) goals scored; 4) head-to-head result.

15 July 2018
09:45

| Germany | 2–1 | Ireland |
|---|---|---|
| Kurz 20', 28' | Report | O'Brien 17' |

Umpires:
Cristina Pérez (ESP)
Victoria Pazoz (PAR)

15 July 2018
12:00

| England | 4–0 | Belarus |
|---|---|---|
| Greenwood 17', 49'; Bourne 28'; McCabe 31' | Report |

Umpires:
Anne van den Bosch (BEL)
Maartje de Bruijn (NED)

16 July 2018
13:15

| Ireland | 3–1 | Belarus |
|---|---|---|
| Benallal 14'; Kelly 30'; Pratt 54' | Report | Batsiukova 2' |

Umpires:
Cristina Pérez (ESP)
Ilaria Amorosini (ITA)

16 July 2018
15:30

| England | 1–3 | Germany |
|---|---|---|
| Hamilton 55' | Report | Sippel 32'; Nolte 36'; Mandel 38' |

Umpires:
Anne van den Bosch (BEL)
Victoria Pazoz (PAR)

18 July 2018
12:30

| Germany | 8–1 | Belarus |
|---|---|---|
| Sippel 3', 32', 51'; Kurz 14'; Hofmeister 25', 58'; Nolte 44', 60' | Report | Dzmitryievich 54' |

Umpires:
Cristina Pérez (ESP)
Rebecca Woodcock (ENG)

18 July 2018
14:45

| Ireland | 0–4 | England |
|---|---|---|
| | Report | Redgrove 6'; Hamilton 30'; Greenwood 36', 39' |

Umpires:
Maartje de Bruijn (NED)
Volha Matusevich (BLR)

== Fifth to eighth place classification ==
=== Pool C ===
The points obtained in the preliminary round against the other team are taken over.

| Pos | Team | Pld | W | D | L | GF | GA | GD | Pts | Relegation |
|---|---|---|---|---|---|---|---|---|---|---|
| 1 | Spain (H) | 3 | 3 | 0 | 0 | 14 | 2 | +12 | 9 | |
| 2 | Ireland | 3 | 2 | 0 | 1 | 9 | 8 | +1 | 6 | |
| 3 | Belarus (R) | 3 | 1 | 0 | 2 | 2 | 7 | −5 | 3 | Youth Championship II |
| 4 | France (R) | 3 | 0 | 0 | 3 | 4 | 12 | −8 | 0 | Youth Championship II |

Source: EHF
Rules for classification: 1) points; 2) goal difference; 3) goals scored; 4) head-to-head result.
(H) Hosts; (R) Relegated

20 July 2018
10:15

| France | 0–1 | Belarus |
|---|---|---|
| | Report | Mihunova 44' |

Umpires:
Ellie Duffy (IRL)
Teresa Lipsky (GER)

20 July 2018
16:50

| Spain | 4–1 | Ireland |
|---|---|---|
| L. Barrios 11'; Strappato 14'; S. Barrios 44', 47' | Report | Perdue 54' |

Umpires:
Victoria Pazoz (PAR)
Volha Matusevich (BLR)

21 July 2018
16:45

| Spain | 4–0 | Belarus |
|---|---|---|
| L. Barrios 11'; Strappato 26', 38', 52' | Report |

Umpires:
Maartje de Bruijn (NED)
Ellie Duffy (IRL)

21 July 2018
18:45

| Ireland | 5–3 | France |
|---|---|---|
| Pratt 9'; Benallal 24', 40'; Twomey 32', 35' | Report | De Vries 26'; La Naour 43'; Lesgourgues 53' |

Umpires:
Teresa Lipsky (GER)
Rebecca Woodcock (ENG)

== First to fourth place classification ==
=== Bracket ===
Semi-finals
20 July
Germany | 0
Belgium | 1
20 July
Netherlands | 6
England | 1

Final
21 July
Belgium | 0
Netherlands | 5
Third place
21 July
Germany | 1
England | 2

=== Semi-finals ===
20 July 2018
12:20

| Germany | 0–1 | Belgium |
|---|---|---|
| | Report | Duquesne 12' |

Umpires:
Cristina Pérez (ESP)
Maarje de Bruijn (NED)

20 July 2018
14:30

| Netherlands | 6–1 | England |
|---|---|---|
| Fokke 4'; Tukkers 12'; Benninga 13'; Beetsma 38', 58'; Van der Veldt 50' | Report | Redgrove 35' |

Umpires:
Anne van den Bosch (BEL)
Ilaria Amorosini (ITA)

=== Third and fourth place ===
21 July 2018
12:00

| Germany | 1–2 | England |
|---|---|---|
| Stoffelsma 30' | Report | McCabe 46'; Vanderstichele 53' |

Umpires:
Cristina Pérez (ESP)
Anne van den Bosch (BEL)

=== Final ===
21 July 2018
17:00

| Belgium | 0–5 | Netherlands |
|---|---|---|
| | Report | Van der Veldt 11'; Omrani 26'; Fokke 29'; Beetsma 39'; Van der Veerdonk 49' |

Umpires:
Victoria Pazoz (PAR)
Ilaria Amorosini (ITA)

== Statistics ==
=== Final standings ===
| Pos | Team | Relegation |
|---|---|---|
| 1st place, gold medalist(s) | Netherlands (C) | |
| 2nd place, silver medalist(s) | Belgium | |
| 3rd place, bronze medalist(s) | England | |
| 4 | Germany | |
| 5 | Spain (H) | |
| 6 | Ireland | |
| 7 | Belarus (R) | Youth Championship II |
| 8 | France (R) | Youth Championship II |

Source: EHF
(C) Champion; (H) Host; (R) Relegated

=== Goalscorers ===
There were 95 goals scored in 20 matches, for an average of 4.75 goals per match.

7 goals

- (Spain) Sara Barrios

5 goals

- (Netherlands) Bente van der Veldt

4 goals

- (England) Rachel Greenwood
- (Germany) Carlotta Sippel
- (Netherlands) Tessa Beetsma
- (Spain) Júlia Strappato

3 goals

- (Germany) Lisa Nolte
- (Germany) Stine Kurz
- (Ireland) Nadia Benallal
- (Netherlands) Sosha Benninga
- (Netherlands) Luna Fokke
- (Netherlands) Noor Omrani
- (Netherlands) Carlijn Tukkers
- (Spain) Laura Barrios

2 goals

- (Belgium) Ambre Ballenghien
- (Belgium) Vanessa Blockmans
- (Belgium) Juliette Duquesne
- (England) Sophie Hamilton
- (England) Victoria McCabe
- (England) Molly Redgrove
- (Germany) Inme Hofmeister
- (Ireland) Yasmin Pratt
- (Ireland) Natasha Twomey
- (Netherlands) Danique van der Veerdonk

1 goal

- (Belarus) Dziyana Batsiukova
- (Belarus) Palina Dzmitryievich
- (Belarus) Karyna Mihunova
- (Belgium) Jill van Bauwel
- (Belgium) Lyne van Dieren
- (Belgium) Charlotte Englebert
- (England) Darcy Bourne
- (England) Lynn Vanderstichele
- (France) Guusje van Bolhuis
- (France) Alizée Isoré
- (France) Alice Lesgourgues
- (France) Quitterie la Naour
- (France) Alissia de Vries
- (Germany) Yara Mandel
- (Germany) Lilly Stoffelsma
- (Ireland) Hannah Kelly
- (Ireland) Siofra O'Brien
- (Ireland) Caoimhe Perdue
- (Netherlands) Noor de Baat
- (Netherlands) Kiki Rozemeijer
- (Spain) Laura Bosch
- (Spain) Lucía Monslave
- (Spain) Candelaria Santacrúz

Source: EuroHockey
