= Rutuja Pisal =

Indian field hockey player (born 2002)

Personal information
- Born: 28 November 2002 (age 23) Kolki, Satara district, Maharashtra, India

Sport
- Sport: Field hockey
- Position: Forward
Senior career
Years	Team	Caps	Goals
–	Hockey Maharashtra	-	-
–	Union Bank of India	-	-
2025–	Odisha Warriors	-	-
National team
Years	Team	Caps	Goals
2023	India U21	16	(2)
2022–	India Hockey5s	10	(9)
2025–	India	43	(16)
Medal record
Women's field hockey
Representing India
Asian Games
Gold medal – first place	2026 Aichi–Nagoya	Team
Hockey5s World Cup
Silver medal – second place	2024 Muscat
Asia Cup
Silver medal – second place	2025 Hangzhou
Junior Asia Cup
Gold medal – first place	2023 Japan

Rutuja Dadaso Pisal (born 28 November 2002) is an Indian field hockey player from Maharashtra. She plays for the India women's national field hockey team as a forward. She plays for Union Bank of India and Hockey Maharashtra in the domestic tournaments. She played for Odisha Warriors, the winners of the inaugural Hero Hockey India Women's League 2024.

== Early life ==
Pisal is from Kolki village, Satara district, Maharashtra. She was spotted by Vikas Bhujbal, a former volleyball player and a sports teacher, who saw her running and asked her to attend the summer athletics camp. In 2011, he sent her for selection trials at Krida Praboshini school in Pune, where she did well and later chose hockey following the suggestion by Olympian and hockey coach Ajit Lakra. Her father works at the TVS company in Phaltan taluka, a nearby town and her mother is a home maker.

== Career ==
In 2023, Pisal was part of the Indian team that won the 2023 Junior Asia Cup in Kakamigahara. Later in 2024, she played the FIH Hockey5s World Cup in Oman where India finished second behind the Netherlands, losing the final. Pisal became India's second-highest goal scorer behind Deepika Soreng, with 7 goals in that tournament. She first played for India in the hockey5s in 2022 at the Hero FIH Hockey5s in Lausanne, Switzerland.

She was picked up by Odisha Warriors and she scored both the goals in the final of the Hero Hokey India League to help Warriors win the title. She was in the Senior India National camp in May 2024 and was selected among the core probables. She made her senior India debut in the second leg match of the 2024–25 Pro League against England, where she scored the second equaliser but India lost in the shootout.
