= Danique van der Veerdonk =

Dutch field hockey player (born 2000)

Personal information
- Born: 29 November 2000 (age 25) Landgraaf, Netherlands

Sport
- Sport: Field hockey
- Position: Defence
- Club: Den Bosch
National team
Years	Team	Caps	Goals
2019–2022	Netherlands U–21	11	(2)
2025–	Netherlands	2	(0)
Medal record
Women's field hockey
Representing Netherlands
EuroHockey Championship
Gold medal – first place	2025 Mönchengladbach
FIH Junior World Cup
Gold medal – first place	2022 Potchefstroom
EuroHockey U21 Championship
Silver medal – second place	2019 Valencia
Women's Hockey5s
FIH Junior World Cup
Gold medal – first place	2024 Muscat

Danique van der Veerdonk (born 20 November 2000) is a field hockey player from the Netherlands.

== Personal life ==
Danique van der Veerdonk was born and raised in Landgraaf, a municipality in the Limburg province of the Netherlands.

== Career ==
=== Hoofdklasse ===
In the Dutch Hoofdklasse, van der Veerdonk represents Den Bosch.

=== Under–21 ===
Van der Veerdonk made her international debut at under–21 level. During her junior career with the Netherlands U–21 side, she won silver at the 2019 edition of the EuroHockey U21 Championship in Valencia, and won gold at the 2022 FIH Junior World Cup in Potchefstroom.

=== Hockey5s ===
In addition to traditional eleven a side field hockey, van der Veerdonk also competed in the Hockey5s format. In 2023, she was a member of the Netherlands squad at the EuroHockey5s Championship in Wałcz. She followed this up with a gold medal-winning performance at the FIH Hockey5s World Cup in Muscat.

=== Oranje ===
Van der Veerdonk received her first call-up to the senior national squad in 2025. She made her senior international debut during an FIH Pro League match against Australia in Amsterdam.
