= 2023 Women's Asian Hockey5s World Cup Qualifier =

Field hockey tournament in Oman

1st Women's Asian Hockey5s World Cup Qualifier
Tournament details
- Host country: Oman
- City: Salalah
- Dates: 25 August 2023–28 August 2023
- Teams: 10 (from 1 confederation)
- Venue(s): Sultan Qaboos Youth Complex for Culture and Entertainment

Final positions
- Champions: India (1st title)
- Runner-up: Thailand
- Third place: Malaysia

Tournament statistics
- Matches played: 13
- Goals scored: 141 (10.85 per match)
- Top scorer: (Bangladesh) Orpita Pal (12 goals)
- Best player: (Thailand) Natthakarn Aunjai
- Best young player: (Malaysia) Zati Muhamad
- Best goalkeeper: (Indonesia) Iryani Rumbiak

The 1st Women's Asian Hockey5s World Cup Qualifier (Women's Hockey5s Asia Cup) was the first edition of the Asian Hockey5s World Cup Qualifier for the women's Hockey5s event at the FIH Hockey5s World Cup and also the first Women's Hockey5s Asia Cup tournament. It was held alongside the men's tournament in Salalah, Oman from 25 August to 28 August 2023.

The tournament's winner, runner-up, and third-placed teams qualified for the 2024 Hockey5s World Cup. In the final India defeated Thailand 7-2. Malaysia was the third country to qualify for Asia. As the host, Oman was automatically qualified.

== Teams ==
- Bangladesh
- Chinese Taipei
- Hong Kong
- India
- Indonesia
- Iran
- Japan
- Malaysia
- Oman
- Thailand

== Preliminary round ==
All times are local (UTC+4).

=== Challenger Group ===
Pos	Team	Pld	W	D	L	GF	GA	GD	Pts	Qualification
1	Hong Kong	5	5	0	0	48	18	+30	15	Crossovers
2	Indonesia	5	4	0	1	32	17	+15	12	Crossovers
3	Bangladesh	5	3	0	2	39	27	+12	9	7/8th place game
4	Chinese Taipei	5	2	0	3	33	28	+5	6	7/8th place game
5	Iran	5	1	0	4	15	37	−22	3	9/10th place game
6	Oman (H)	5	0	0	5	6	46	−40	0	9/10th place game

Source: FIH
Rules for classification: 1) points; 2) matches won; 3) goal difference; 4) goals for; 5) head-to-head result; 6) field goals for.
(H) Hosts

25 August 2023
11:00

Indonesia	7–4	Bangladesh
Indira 3', 26', 29'; Ronsumbre 7', 23', 29'; Anisa 25'	Report	Riya 14'; Pal 17', 20', 25'

Umpires:
Fatma Mahmoud (EGY)
Shahiela Johari (MAS)

25 August 2023
12:00

Chinese Taipei	8–3	Iran
Yang 1', 1'; Chang 4'; Liao 15', 21'; Wang 22', 22', 27'	Report	Shafiei 5'; Rezazad 19'; Abbasi 22'

Umpires:
Ming Yeung Chor (HKG)
Hussain Al Hasani (OMA)

25 August 2023
13:00

Hong Kong	16–0	Oman
Y. Chan 4', 12', 20', 28', 29'; Wong 5', 30'; T. Chan 8', 13', 16'; McNeil 15', 24'; Yick 15'; Lau 22', 23'; Chui 27'	Report

Umpires:
Mohomead Nawshad (SRI)
Bhagyashree Agarwal (IND)

25 August 2023
17:00

Hong Kong	9–2	Iran
Lau 1', 28'; T. Chan 4', 7'; McNeil 11', 23'; Wong 17'; Y. Chan 20', 28'	Report	Abbasi 3'; Rezazad 5'

Umpires:
Mohammad Ali Khan (BAN)
Hussain Al Hasani (OMA)

25 August 2023
18:00

Chinese Taipei	5–10	Bangladesh
Yang 3', 10'; Wang 4'; Liao 17', 29'	Report	Pal 1', 3', 3', 17', 22', 30'; Riya 12', 14', 20', 21'

Umpires:
Bhadyashree (IND)
Tomas Holek (CZE)

25 August 2023
19:00

Oman	2–6	Indonesia
Al-Balushi 19'; Al-Mashaiki 25'	Report	Indira 6', 21'; Ronsumbre 8', 13'; Wildiani 9'; Saruli 18'

Umpires:
Aliya Khan (HKG)
Fatma Mahmoud (EGY)

26 August 2023
11:00

Indonesia	3–5	Hong Kong
Ronsumbre 10', 23'; Anisa 19'	Report	Y. Chan 6'; Wong 9'; Lau 11', 25'; T. Chan 29'

Umpires:
Khamis Al Balushi (OMA)
Shahiela Johari (MAS)

26 August 2023
12:00

Bangladesh	9–3	Iran
	Report

26 August 2023
13:00

Oman	1–11	Chinese Taipei
	Report

26 August 2023
17:00

Iran	3–10	Indonesia
	Report

26 August 2023
18:00

Chinese Taipei	6–8	Hong Kong
	Report

26 August 2023
19:00

Bangladesh	9–2	Oman
	Report

27 August 2023
10:00

Hong Kong	10–7	Bangladesh
	Report

27 August 2023
11:00

Indonesia	6–3	Chinese Taipei
	Report

27 August 2023
12:00

Iran	4–1	Oman
	Report

=== Elite Group ===
Pos	Team	Pld	W	D	L	GF	GA	GD	Pts	Qualification
1	India	3	3	0	0	19	7	+12	9	Semi-finals
2	Thailand	3	2	0	1	17	7	+10	6	Semi-finals
3	Japan	3	1	0	2	6	14	−8	3	Crossovers
4	Malaysia	3	0	0	3	5	19	−14	0	Crossovers

Source: FIH
Rules for classification: 1) points; 2) matches won; 3) goal difference; 4) goals for; 5) head-to-head result; 6) field goals for.

25 August 2023
14:00

India	7–2	Malaysia
Kaur 3', 28'; Dhekale 4'; Toppo 12', 20'; Kujur 17'; Choudhary 28'	Report	Wan 7'; Zafirah 11'

Umpires:
Tomas Holek (CZE)
Khamis Al Balushi (OMA)

25 August 2023
20:00

Japan	1–5	Thailand
Koda 13'	Report	Piresram 3'; Sanpoung 4'; Aunjai 5', 14'; Kijpakdee 18'

Umpires:
Khamis Al Balushi (OMA)
Ming Yeung Chor (HKG)

26 August 2023
14:00

Malaysia	1–8	Thailand
Zafirah 24'	Report	Aunjai 13', 22'; Noo-Keaw 15', 18'; Sanpoung 21', 30'; Inpa 23'; Piresram 24'

Umpires:
Tomas Holek (CZE)
Ming Yeung Chor (HKG)

26 August 2023
20:00

Japan	1–7	India
Nakasechi 9'	Report	Choudhary 7', 30'; Dhekale 8'; M. Kujur 12'; Jyoti 23'; Toppo 27'; A. Kujur 30'

Umpires:
Mohammad Ali Khan (BAN)
Fatma Mahmoud (EGY)

27 August 2023
13:00

India	5–4	Thailand
Kaur 1'; Toppo 1', 7'; Choudhary 20'; A. Kujur 30'	Report	Piresram 3'; Aunjai 10', 14'; Konthong 19'

Umpires:
Shahiela Johari (MAS)
Khamis Al Balushi (OMA)

27 August 2023
14:00

Malaysia	2–4	Japan
Zafirah 4', 10'	Report	Nakasechi 1'; Koda 23', 24', 28'

Umpires:
Fatma Mahmoud (EGY)
Hussain Al Hasani (OMA)

== 9/10th place game ==
28 August 2023
11:00

Iran	6–1	Oman
	Report

== 7/8th place game ==
28 August 2023
14:00

Bangladesh	5–8	Chinese Taipei
	Report

== Knockouts ==
=== Bracket ===
First round
Malaysia	5
Hong Kong	3
Japan	1
Indonesia	2

Semifinals
India	9
Malaysia	5
Thailand	5
Indonesia	2

Final
India	7
Thailand	2
Third place
Malaysia (p.s.o.)	4 (2)
Indonesia	4 (1)

Fifth place
Japan	5
Hong Kong	3

=== Crossovers ===
27 August 2023
19:00

Japan	1–2	Indonesia
	Report

27 August 2023
20:00

Malaysia	5–3	Hong Kong
	Report

=== Semi-Finals ===
28 August 2023
12:00

India	9–5	Malaysia
	Report

28 August 2023
13:00

Thailand	5–2	Indonesia
	Report

=== 5th/6th place game ===
28 August 2023
16:00

Japan	5–3	Hong Kong
	Report

=== Bronze medal match ===
28 August 2023
17:00

Malaysia	4–4	Indonesia
	Report
Penalties
	2–1

=== Gold medal match ===
28 August 2023
18:00

India	7–2	Thailand
Mariana 2', 8'; Toppo 7'; Jyoti 10', 27'; Kaur 23'; Choudhary 29'	Report	Inpa 5'; Sanpoung 5'

== Summary ==
Rank	Team	M	W	D	L	GF	GA	GD	Points
1	India	5	5	0	0	35	14	+21	15
2	Thailand	5	3	0	2	24	16	+8	9
3	Malaysia	6	1	1	4	19	35	-16	4
4	Indonesia	7	5	1	2	41	27	+14	16
5	Japan	5	2	0	3	12	19	-7	6
6	Hong Kong	7	5	0	2	54	28	+26	15
7	Chinese Taipei	6	3	0	3	41	33	+8	9
8	Bangladesh	6	3	0	3	44	35	+9	9
9	Iran	6	2	0	4	21	38	-17	6
10	Oman	6	0	0	6	7	52	-45	0

- Points:
1. Win: 3 Points
2. Draw: 1 Points
3. Lose: 0 Points

== Final standings ==
Position	Team
1st	India
2nd	Thailand
3rd	Malaysia
4th	Indonesia
5th	Japan
6th	Hong Kong
7th	Chinese Taipei
8th	Bangladesh
9th	Iran
10th	Oman

Qualified for the FIH Hockey5s World Cup.

== See also ==
- 2023 Men's Asian Hockey5s World Cup Qualifier
