= Rayl (disambiguation) =

Rayl is a unit of acoustic impedance.

Rayl may also refer to:

- Adrienne Sophie Rayl (1898–1989), American mathematician and professor
- Rayl, California, ghost town, United States
- Jimmy Rayl (1941–2019), American basketball player

== See also ==
- Rail (disambiguation)
- Rale (disambiguation)
