= K. Arumugam =

Indian sports journalist, author

K. Arumugam (born 20 June 1958) is an Indian hockey journalist, author, columnist and hockey historian based in New Delhi. He has written over a dozen hockey books and runs an Indian hockey website, stick2hockey.com. He is also the founder of a project that promotes the spread of hockey in India, One Thousand Hockey Legs (OTHL). OTHL started with a target of training 500 students from schools and underprivileged backgrounds every year.

== Early life and background ==
Arumugam hails from Tamil Nadu. He did his schooling at the Government High School in Thirumarugal, near Nagapatanam, Tamil Nadu. Then, he studied at Presidency College, Chennai and completed his graduation from IIT, Bombay (now Mumbai). He resides in Delhi with his wife Shanti, and they have two children. A qualified geologist, he later moved to Delhi to work as a water scientist. But he quit his Central Government job to focus full time on his hockey work.

== Projects ==
One of the main projects, One Thousand Hockey Legs (OTHL), was formally started in 2008. The project work in schools actually started at the turn of the century and aims to train 500 students below 15 years, from select schools, to make 1000 hockey legs. OTHL selects schools and enters into a partnership, provides coaches and equipment and the school has to provide a space and time to develop a hockey team. Starting with Delhi, the OTHL schools were started in Kolkata, Chennai, Kanpur and Puducherry. By the end of 2023, OTHL teams were functioning in 18 government schools in Delhi. Overall, it trains over 5000 students in 100 government schools across five cities as of December 2025. The cost of about Rs.12 lakhs a year is spent by Arumugam on his own, with part of the support coming from donations from friends, and the proceeds from his hockey books.

== Award ==
He was awarded Rashtriya Khel Protsahan Puruskar by President Pranab Mukherjee on 29 August 2016, the Indian Sports Day at Rashtrapati Bhavan. He was also awarded the Hockey India President's Outstanding Achievement Award for the years 2015 and 2016.

== Dhyan Chand chapter in text books ==
Arumugam's article titled The Wizard was taken from one of his books, The Great Indian Olympians and was included in the Class XI English text books by NCERT (2002-2003).
