= Rail (name) =

Rail is a given name and surname. Notable people with the name include:

Given name

- Rail Malikov (born 1985), Azerbaijani football defender
- Rail Rozakov (born 1981), Russian ice hockey defenceman
- Rail Zaripov (born 1995), Russian football player

Surname

- Joanes Rail (born 1958), Canadian handball player

== See also ==
- Jimmy Rayl (1941–2019), American basketball player
