= Mumtaz Khan (field hockey) =

Indian hockey player (born 2003)

Personal information
- Born: 15 January 2003 (age 23) Lucknow, Uttar Pradesh, India

Sport
- Sport: Field hockey
- Position: Forward
Youth career
- Years: Team
- 2016: India U18
- 2018: India U18 Hockey5s
Senior career
Years	Team	Caps	Goals
–	Indian Oil Corporation Ltd	-	-
2025–	Delhi SG Pipers	-	-
National team
Years	Team	Caps	Goals
2022–	India Hockey5's	10	(11)
2019–2024	India U21	32	(31)
2023–	India	19	(6)
Medal record
Women's field hockey
Representing India
Asia Cup
Silver medal – second place	2025 Hangzhou
Hockey5s World Cup
Silver medal – second place	2024 Muscat
Youth Olympic Games
Silver medal – second place	2018 Buenos Aires	Team
Junior Asia Cup
Gold medal – first place	2023 Kakamigahara
Gold medal – first place	2024 Muscat
Girls' Asia Cup
Bronze medal – third place	2016 Bangkok

Mumtaz Khan (born 15 January 2003) is an Indian women's field hockey player from Uttar Pradesh. She plays as a forward. She made her senior India debut in February 2024 at the FIH pro-league at Bhubaneswar. She plays for Indian Oil Corporation Limited in the domestic tournaments.

== Personal life ==
Khan hails from Lucknow. Her parents, Kaiser Jahan and Hafiz Khan, sell vegetables on a push cart. She has five sisters Farha, Shanaz, Tarannum, Shireen, Sania and a brother, Armaan. Since the family has no house of their own, they stay in the house of her mother's brother (mama). She started playing hockey in 2014. In 2023, she secured employment with Indian Oil Corporation.

== Career ==
In 2017, Khan was selected for the Junior India team. She was part of the Indian youth team that won silver at the 3rd Youth Olympics Games 2018, Buenos Aires, Argentina. She was also part of the girls u-18 team that won bronze medal at the 2016 Youth Asia Cup. She was India's top scorer with eight goals at the 2022 Junior World Cup in South Africa. She made her hockey5s senior India debut at the FIH Hockey5s in Lausanne. After a layout due to an injury, she is back in the senior India team for the FIH Pro League in Bhubaneswar, where she got her maiden India cap against China on 2 February 2024. In January 2024, she was part of the Indian team that won silver at the Hockey5s World Cup in Muscat, Oman.

== Awards ==
- In 2021, she received FIH Women's Rising Star of the Year award.
- In 2022, she received Hockey India’s Asunta Lakra Award for Upcoming Player of the Year.
