= Luna Fokke =

Dutch field hockey player (born 2001)

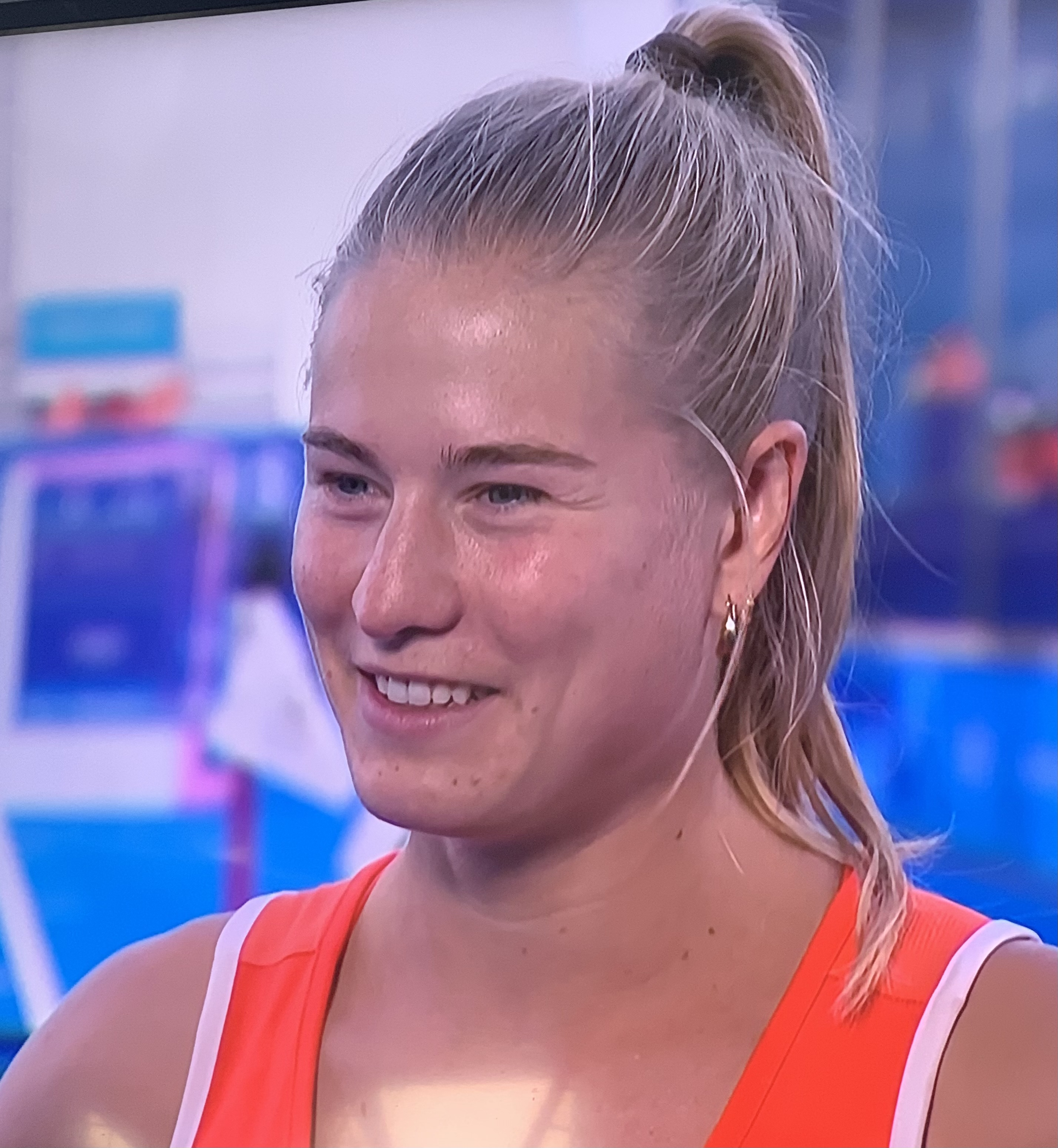
- Fokke at the 2024 Summer Olympics

Personal information
- Full name: Luna Noa Fokke
- Born: 9 March 2001 (age 25) Leidschendam, Netherlands

Sport
- Sport: Field hockey
- Position: Midfield
Senior career
Years	Team	Caps	Goals
–	Kampong	-	-
National team
Years	Team	Caps	Goals
2018	Netherlands U–18	5	(3)
2022	Netherlands U–21	11	(13)
2022–	Netherlands	30	(5)
Medal record
Women's field hockey
Representing Netherlands
Olympic Games
Gold medal – first place	2024 Paris	Team
World Cup
Silver medal – second place	2026 Wavre/Amstelveen
FIH Junior World Cup
Gold medal – first place	2022 Potchefstroom
EuroHockey Championship
Gold medal – first place	2023 Mönchengladbach
Gold medal – first place	2025 Mönchengladbach
EuroHockey Junior Championship
Bronze medal – third place	2022 Ghent
EuroHockey Youth Championship
Gold medal – first place	2018 Santander
FIH Pro League
Gold medal – first place	Season Four
Gold medal – first place	Season Five

Luna Noa Fokke (born 9 March 2001) is a Dutch field hockey player. She played at SV Kampong in the midfield. Since 2022 she plays for the Netherlands national team. With the national team she won the FIH Pro League 2023 and EuroHockey Championship 2023.

== Personal life ==
Fokke was born and raised in Leidschendam. She currently lives in Utrecht, where she studies computer science.

== Career ==
=== Domestic hockey ===
In the Netherlands' domestic league, the Hoofdklasse, Fokke represents Kampong.

=== Under–18 ===
In 2018, Fokke was a member of the Netherlands U–18 team that won gold at the 2018 EuroHockey Youth Championship in Santander.

=== Junior national team ===
Fokke made her debut for the junior national team in 2022 at the FIH Junior World Cup in Potchefstroom. At the tournament she won a gold medal. Later that year she represented the team again at the EuroHockey Junior Championship in Ghent, where she won a bronze medal.

=== Senior ===
Following her success in the national junior teams, Fokke was called up to make her senior international debut in 2022. She made her first appearance in a 2021–22 FIH Pro League match against England.

In 2023, she was named in the national squad. She has since appeared in season four of the FIH Pro League.

Fokke won the title FIH Pro League from 2023 and the EuroHockey Championships 2023 with the Dutch National Team.

International goals
Goal	Date	Location	Opponent	Score	Result	Competition	Ref.
1	7 June 2023	HC Oranje-Rood, Eindhoven, Netherlands	China	1–0	4–0	2022–23 FIH Pro League	
2	17 June 2023	Lee Valley Hockey and Tennis Centre, London, Great Britain	United States	6–0	6–0	2022–23 FIH Pro League	
3	7 December 2023	Santiago del Estero, Argentina	Great Britain	0-8	0-8	2022–23 FIH Pro League	
4	11 December 2023	Santiago del Estero, Argentina	Argentina	0-3	1-7	2022–23 FIH Pro League	
5	3 February 2024	Bhubaneswar, India	United States	0-1	0-7	2022–23 FIH Pro League	
