= Jude Menezes =

Indian field hockey player

Personal information
- Born: 8 May 1971 (age 55) Mumbai, Maharashtra
- Height: 5 ft 8 in (173 cm)

Sport
- Sport: Field hockey
- Position: Goalkeeper
Senior career
| Years | Team | Caps | Goals |
| – | Bharat Petroleum Corp. Ltd. | - | - |
National team
| Years | Team | Caps | Goals |
| 1992–2002 | India | 133 | - |
Coaching career
- 2021–: Japan
- 2024–: Soorma Hockey Club
Medal record
Men's field hockey
Representing India
Champions Challenge
| Gold medal – first place | 2001 Kuala Lumpur | Team |

Jude Menezes (born 5 August 1971 in Mumbai, Maharashtra) is an Indian field hockey coach and former goalkeeper, who is currently the head coach of the Japan women's team. He also served as the goalkeeping coach of the Blacks Sticks Women's Team and the head coach of Auckland Women's Hockey Team. Jude represented India at 133 international matches, prominent among them the 2000 Summer Olympics in Sydney, Australia, 1998 Hockey World Cup at Utrecht, Holland and 2002 World Cup at Kuala Lumpur, Malaysia. He moved to New Zealand in 2002 and is coaching field hockey teams at the highest level.

== Domestic hockey career ==
Menezes represented and captained Mumbai Hockey at sub junior, junior and senior level at the Nationals. He represented Tata Sports Club, Mahindra & Mahindra and Bharat Petroleum Corporation Limited at the Super League and National tournaments. Menezes at the age of 19 was awarded the Best Goalkeeper at the prestigious Nehru Cup in 1989.

== International hockey career ==
Menezes made his international debut for India in 1992 at the Junior World Cup at Kuala Lumpur and went on to play 133 international caps until he retired in 2002.

Career highlights

- Olympics – Sep 2000 – Sydney
- World Cup – Feb/Mar 2002 - Kuala Lumpur
- World Cup May 1998 – Utrecht
- Commonwealth Games – Sep 1998 – Kuala Lumpur (4th)
- Sultan Azlan Shah Cup – Feb 2000 – Kuala Lumpur (3rd)
- Prime Minister's Gold Cup – Mar 2001 – Dhaka (1st); saved two penalty strokes in tie-breaker in final
- Champions Challenge – Nov 2001 – Kuala Lumpur India (1st)

In 2001 Menezes was awarded the prestigious Shiv Chhatrapati sports award by the Government of Maharashtra.

== Coaching career ==
Menezes moved to New Zealand in 2002 and worked full-time in the health and fitness industry and also coached field hockey teams. Since 2014 he is a full-time field hockey coach.

Menezes's coaching career:

On 2 November 2021, he became the head coach of the Japanese Women Hockey team

2015 GK Coach of NZ Women's National Team (2nd in World League Final, 2nd in Oceania Cup) 2016 GK Coach and Team Manager of NZ Women's National Team

           4th in Rio de Janeiro Olympic Games

2017 GK Coach and Team Manager of NZ Women's National Team (2nd in Oceania Cup, 42nd in World League, 33rd World League) 2018 GK Coach and Team Manager of NZ Women's National Team (Champion in Commonwealth Games, Participation in World Cup) Assistant Coach of NZ U21 Men's National Team (Participation in Sultan Johor Cup) 2019-2021 Assistant Coach of NZ Women's National Team (Champion in 2020 Oceania Cup, 8th in Tokyo 2020 Olympic Games)

- Nov 2014 Black Sticks women's goal keeping coach, Champions Trophy - Mendoza Argentina: 4th Place.
- Oct 2014 Black Sticks under 21 head coach, 5 Test Series versus India – New Zealand: 3-0 Series winners.
- Sep 2014 Black Sticks women's goal keeping coach, 6 Test Series versus USA – New Zealand.
- July 2014 Black Sticks women's goal keeping coach, XIV Commonwealth Games – Glasgow UK: Bronze medal.
- August 2014 Auckland women's team head coach, 2014 Ford NHL Championships – Auckland : Champions.
- July 2013 Auckland women's team head coach, 2013 Ford NHL Championships – Auckland : 3rd Place.
- July 2012 Auckland women's team goalkeeping/assistant coach, 2012 Ford NHL Championships – Auckland : 2nd Place.
- 2012–2013 Pukekohe Indians Sports Club, head coach. 2004–2005 Auckland Indian Sports Club, head coach
- 2004–2005 Auckland Indian Sports Club, head coach
