= Railing =

Railing or railings may refer to:

- Railings (horse), a racehorse
- Guard rail, a structure blocking an area from access
  - Cable railings, a type of guard rail
- Handrail, a structure designed to provide support on or near a staircase
- Grab bar, a structure to provide support elsewhere, for instance in a bathroom or kitchen
- Insufflation (medicine), the act of inhaling a substance, generally a drug
- "Railing," a song by Roni Size & Reprazent from their album New Forms
