= Lora Bukalidi =

Fijian footballer

- Born: 27 August 1996 (age 30)
Association football career
- Position: Midfielder
Team information
- Current team: Tailevu Naitasiri
Senior career*
| Years | Team | Apps | (Gls) |
- Tailevu Naitasiri
International career^{‡}
| 2019– | Fiji | 3 | (1) |
- * Club domestic league appearances and goals ‡ National team caps and goals as of 18 July 2019
Field hockey career
- Sport: Field hockey
National team
| Years | Team | Caps | Goals |
| 2014-present | Fiji | 7 | (0) |
| 2016-present | Fiji Hockey5s | 18 | (16) |
| 2014 | Fiji U18 | 10 | (3) |
- Updated on 18 July 2023

Lora Bukalidi (born 27 August 1996) is a Fijian footballer who plays as a midfielder for Tailevu Naitasiri FC and the Fiji women's national team.

Bukalidi is also a field hockey player, having represented Fiji at the 2014 Summer Youth Olympics.
