= Rural Appalachian Improvement League =

Vision	RAIL works to eradicate root causes of poverty in southern West Virginia
Established	2002
Location	Mullens, West Virginia
Area Served	McDowell, Raleigh, and Wyoming Counties
Homepage	www.railwv.org

The Rural Appalachian Improvement League (RAIL) is a 501(c)(3) non-profit corporation based in Mullens, West Virginia. Since 2001, when flooding devastated southern West Virginia, RAIL has worked to improve the quality of life for residents of the area. Its mission is "to build human & civic capacity through incubation of nonprofit and grassroots organizations, and through the provision of programs in health, home repair, and education at the Mullens Opportunity Center." ()

RAIL is located in the Mullens Opportunity Center (MOC), which it also administers. The MOC is located at 300 Front Street, in the former Mullens Elementary School. RAIL programs offered at the MOC include GED and literacy classes, high-speed public internet access, meeting space, a fitness center, and business incubator opportunities. The Upper Guyandotte Watershed Association(UGWA) is a separate non-profit launched by RAIL that also operates out of the MOC.

Many of the programs at RAIL have been developed by AmeriCorps VISTAs, many of whom are from other regions of the United States. Other RAIL activities focus on community economic development, housing, cultural heritage, environment, and property acquisition.

In 2007, Wyoming County was designated a 'Pilot Community' by Groundwork USA, which is a nationwide organization that is "a network of independent, not-for-profit, environmental businesses" that gets "local people, business, government and other organizations involved in practical projects." Groundwork strives to help communities improve their local environment by reclaiming brownfields, abandoned lands, and other under-utilized properties and returning them to productive use such as recreation, green space, and commercial development. ()

RAIL was appointed administrator for a grant to study the formation of Groundwork Wyoming County (GWWC), and will act as consultant in a feasibility study. If launched, GWWC will be the first rural Groundwork Trust in the U.S., and its course will set important precedents, both within Groundwork USA and in rural Appalachia.

RAIL also helped launch the Wyoming County Business Retention, Expansion, and Development (BRE&D) Program that works to connect local businesses and entrepreneurs with the resources they need to be successful. These resources include business planning, employee training, financial assistance, and networking opportunities.
