= Rail, Missouri =

Extinct hamlet in Missouri, U.S.

Coordinates: 37°17′59″N 92°18′18″W

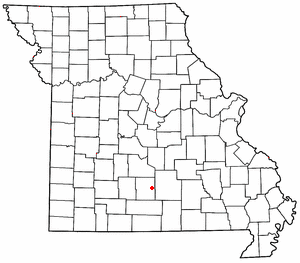

Rail is an extinct town in east central Wright County, in the Ozarks of southern Missouri, United States. The GNIS classifies it as a populated place. The village was located on the west bank of Beaver Creek, just southeast of the intersection of Missouri routes 38 and 95.

A post office called Rail was established in 1888, and remained in operation until 1906. The community has the name of the local Rail family.
