= Time in Oman =

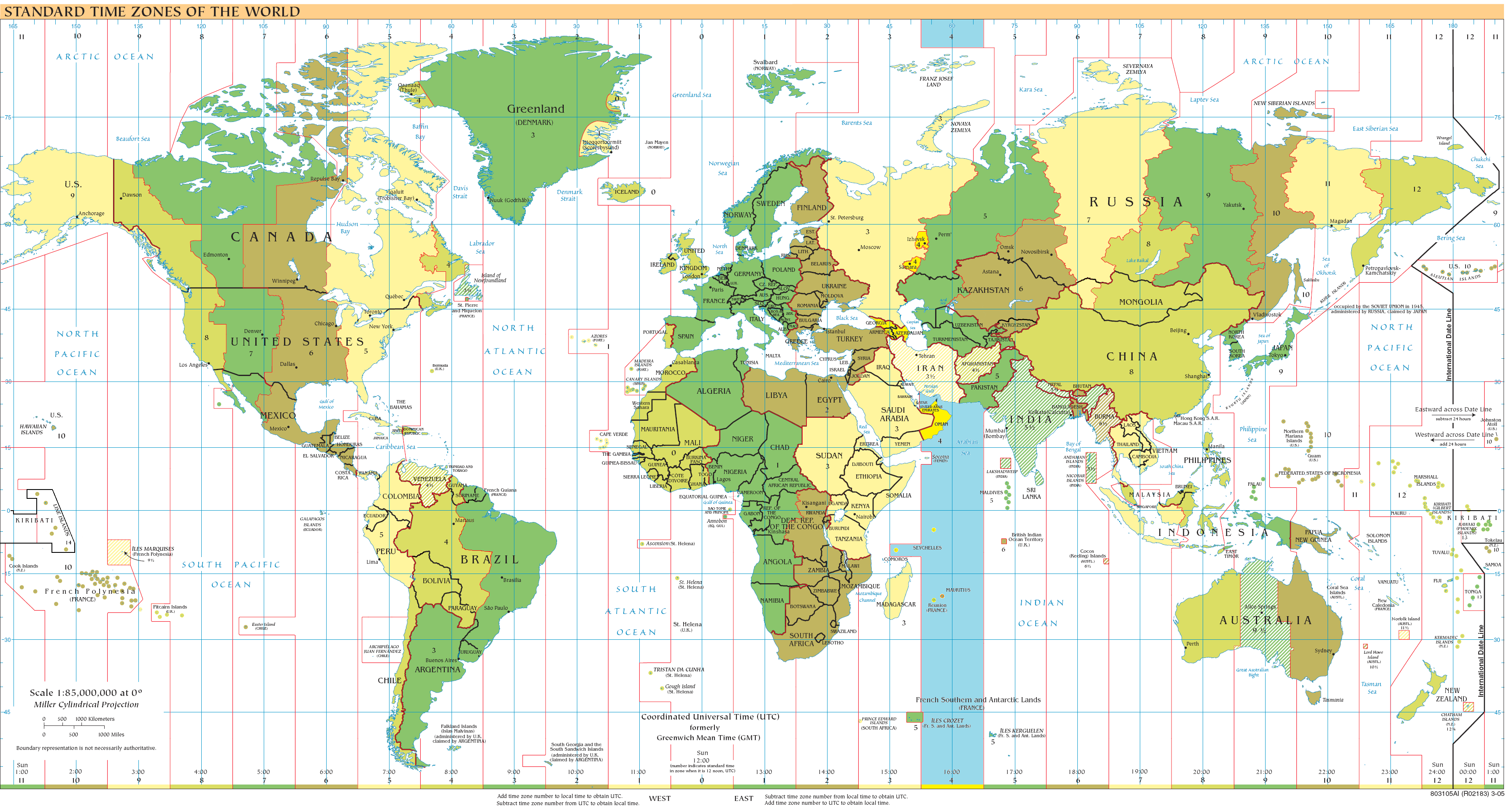
UTC+04:00 time zone (blue)

Time in Oman is given by Gulf Standard Time (GST) (UTC+04:00). Oman does not observe daylight saving time.

Current time for UTC+4 is 10:41

== IANA time zone database ==
In the IANA time zone database, Oman is given one zone in the file zone.tab – Asia/Muscat. Data for Muscat taken directly from zone.tab of the IANA time zone database; columns marked with * are the columns from zone.tab itself:

| c.c* | coordinates* | TZ* | Comments* | Standard time | Summer time |
|---|---|---|---|---|---|
| OM | +2336+05835 | Asia/Muscat | | +04:00 | —N/a |
