= Rail Zaripov =

Russian footballer (born 1995)

Personal information
- Full name: Rail Ayratovich Zaripov
- Date of birth: 25 May 1995 (age 31)
- Place of birth: Naberezhnye Chelny, Tatarstan, Russia
- Height: 1.75 m (5 ft 9 in)
- Positions: Forward; midfielder

Senior career*
Years	Team	Apps	(Gls)
2012–2013	FC KAMAZ Naberezhnye Chelny	0	(0)
2013–2014	FC Gazovik Orenburg	1	(0)
2014–2015	FC KAMAZ Naberezhnye Chelny	7	(0)
2015–2016	FC Syzran-2003	3	(0)
2016–2017	FC KAMAZ Naberezhnye Chelny	13	(0)
- * Club domestic league appearances and goals

Rail Ayratovich Zaripov (Tatar: Раил Айрат улы Зарипов, Russian: Раиль Айратович Зарипов; born 25 May 1995) is a Russian former football player.

== Club career ==
He made his debut in the Russian Football National League for FC Gazovik Orenburg on 23 November 2013 in a game against FC Dynamo Saint Petersburg.
