= Panposh =

- Census town
- Location in Odisha, India Panposh (India)
- Coordinates: 22.25°N 84.80°E
- Country: India
- State: Odisha
- District: Sundargarh
- Elevation: 183 m (600 ft)

Population (2001)
  - Total: 10,227

Languages
  - Official: Odia
- Time zone: UTC+5:30 (IST)
- Vehicle registration: OD
- Website: odisha.gov.in

Panposh is a census town in Sundargarh district in the Indian state of Odisha. It is a part of Rourkela City.

== Demographics ==
As of 2001 India census, Panposh had a population of 10,227. Males constitute 51% of the population and females 49%. Panposh has an average literacy rate of 67%, compared to the national average of 59.5%: male literacy is 74%, and female literacy 61%. In Panposh, 12% of the population is under 6 years of age.

== Transport ==
Panposh is a station on the Tatanagar–Bilaspur section of Howrah-Nagpur-Mumbai line.
