= 2022 Women's FIH Hockey5s =

International field hockey competition

Tournament details
- City: Lausanne, Switzerland
- Dates: 4–6 June
- Teams: 5 (from 4 confederations)
- Venue: Place de la Navigation

Final positions
- Champions: Uruguay (1st title)
- Runner-up: Switzerland
- Third place: South Africa

Tournament statistics
- Matches played: 11
- Goals scored: 58 (5.27 per match)
- Top scorer: (Uruguay) Teresa Viana (8 goals)
- Best player: (Uruguay) Teresa Viana
- Best goalkeeper: (Switzerland) Ursina Fazis

The 2022 Women's FIH Hockey5s was a women's field hockey series, staged in the hockey5's format. The tournament was held at the Place de la Navigation in Lausanne, from 4–5 June.

The competition marked the first time the International Hockey Federation hosted a senior international tournament in the Hockey5s format. The tournament was held simultaneously with a men's event.

Uruguay won the tournament, defeating Switzerland 3–1 in the final.

== Results ==
=== Preliminary round ===
Pos	Team	Pld	W	D	L	GF	GA	GD	Pts	Qualification
1	Uruguay	4	4	0	0	14	6	+8	12	Final
2	Switzerland	4	2	0	2	9	10	−1	6	Final
3	South Africa	4	1	1	2	12	13	−1	4	
4	India	4	1	1	2	12	14	−2	4	
5	Poland	4	1	0	3	7	11	−4	3	

Source: FIH
Rules for classification: 1) points; 2) goal difference; 3) games won; 4) head-to-head result.

==== Fixtures ====
4 June 2022
13:00

Switzerland	3–1	Poland
Zimmermann 8', 20'; Fontana 17'	Report	Katerla 8'

Umpires:
Benjamin Messerli (SUI)
Rachel Williams (ENG)

4 June 2022
14:30

India	3–4	Uruguay
Ajmina 1', 7'; Vaishnavi 18'	Report	Viana 2', 10', 19'; Vilar 6'

Umpires:
Rachel Williams (ENG)
Ana Faias (POR)

4 June 2022
15:30

South Africa	1–3	Switzerland
Jansen van Vuren 19'	Report	Hoxhaj 6'; Pöhler 12'; Stomps 18'

Umpires:
Lukasz Zwierzchowski (POL)
Ilaria Amorosini (ITA)

4 June 2022
16:30

Poland	3–1	India
Polewczak 16'; Katerla 18'; Suszyńska 19'	Report	Rashmita 6'

Umpires:
Ilaria Amorosini (ITA)
Benjamin Messerli (SUI)

4 June 2022
17:30

Uruguay	4–0	Switzerland
Viana 2', 15'; Vilar 12', 20'	Report

Umpires:
Ana Faias (POR)
Sophie Bockelmann (GER)

4 June 2022
18:30

Poland	2–5	South Africa
Katerla 17'; Sławińska 20'	Report	Chamberlain 5'; Marks 9', 17', 19'; Manuel 15'

Umpires:
Sophie Bockelmann (GER)
Ilaria Amorosini (ITA)

5 June 2022
13:30

South Africa	2–4	Uruguay
Chamberlain 9'; Marks 12'	Report	Dall'Orso 4'; Vilar 7'; Viana 16', 16'

Umpires:
Sean Edwards (ENG)
Ana Faias (POR)

5 June 2022
14:30

Switzerland	3–4	India
Zimmermann 2'; Härtsch 4'; Stomps 11'	Report	Rutuja 3'; Mumtaz 10', 14', 17'

Umpires:
Benjamin Messerli (SUI)
Lukasz Zwierzchowski (POL)

5 June 2022
15:30

Uruguay	2–1	Poland
De María 14'; Vilar 18'	Report	Tatarczuk 6'

Umpires:
Ana Faias (POR)
Ilaria Amorosini (ITA)

5 June 2022
16:30

India	4–4	South Africa
Mumtaz 7', 9'; Rutuja 8'; Mariana 12'	Report	Chamberlain 2', 5', 19'; Manuel 4'

Umpires:
Lukasz Zwierzchowski (POL)
Ana Faias (POR)

=== Final ===
5 June 2022
18:00

Uruguay	3–1	Switzerland
Vilar 3', 4'; Viana 5'	Report	Stomps 1'

Umpires:
Rachel Williams (ENG)
Lukasz Zwierzchowski (POL)

== Awards ==
Top Goalscorer	Player of the Tournament	Goalkeeper of the Tournament
(Uruguay) Teresa Viana	(Uruguay) Teresa Viana	(Switzerland) Ursina Fazis

== Goalscorers ==
There have been 58 goals scored in 11 matches, for an average of 5.27 goals per match.

8 goals

- (Uruguay) Teresa Viana

7 goals

- (Uruguay) Manuela Vilar

5 goals

- (India) Mumtaz Khan
- (South Africa) Dirkie Chamberlain

4 goals

- (South Africa) Toni Marks

3 goals

- (Poland) Amelia Katerla
- (Switzerland) Sofie Stomps
- (Switzerland) Carina Zimmermann

2 goals

- (India) Ajmina Kujur
- (India) Rutaja Pisal
- (South Africa) Candice Manuel

1 goal

- (China) Zhang Ying
- (India) Mariana Kujur
- (India) Rashmita Minz
- (India) Vaishnavi Phalke
- (Poland) Monika Polewczak
- (Poland) Paula Slawinska
- (Poland) Natasza Suszynska
- (Poland) Sandra Tatarczuk
- (South Africa) Lezaan Jansen van Vuren
- (Switzerland) Sae Fontana
- (Switzerland) Diana Hoxhaj
- (Switzerland) Dunja Härtsch
- (Switzerland) Nele Pöhler
- (Uruguay) Kaisuami Dall'Orso
- (Uruguay) Camila de María

Source: FIH

== See also ==
- 2022 Men's FIH Hockey5s
