= India women's national hockey5s team =

Hockey5s team that represents India

India hockey5s women
- Association: Hockey India
- Confederation: AHF (Asia)
- Head Coach: (India) Soundarya Yendala
- Captain: Rajani Etimarpu
- Top scorer: Mariana Kujur (13)

FIH ranking
- Current: 1 (March 2024)

First international
- India 3–4 Uruguay (Lausanne, 4 June 2022)

Last international
- Netherlands 7–2 India (Muscat, 27 January 2024)

Biggest win
- India 11–1 New Zealand (Muscat, 26 January 2024

Hockey5s World Cup
- Appearances: 1 (first in 2024)
- Best result: (silver) Runner-up (2024)

Hockey5s Asia Cup
- Appearances: 1 (first in 2023)
- Best result: (gold) Champions (2023)
Medal record
Hockey5s World Cup
Silver medal – second place	2024 Muscat
Hockey5s Asia Cup
Gold medal – first place	2023 Salalah

The India women's national hockey5s team represents India in international senior hockey5s tournaments and is governed by the Hockey India. India are the reigning World Cup silver medallists and Asian champions. They are the no. 1 ranked team in the world.

== History ==
The senior team first competed at the inaugural 2022 FIH Hockey5s tournament in Lausanne and finished 4th. India won the inaugural Women's Hockey5s Asia Cup in 2023 and qualified for the first ever Hockey5s World Cup tournament. India won silver in the 2024 Hockey5s World Cup as they went down to the Dutch in the final.

== Tournament record ==
=== FIH Hockey5s World Cup ===
FIH Hockey5s World Cup record
Year	Round	Position	Pld	W	D*	L	GF	GA
(Oman) 2024	Final	2nd	6	5	0	1	38	20
Total	1/1	2nd	6	5	0	1	38	20

=== Hockey5s Asia Cup ===
Hockey5s Asia Cup record
Year	Round	Position	Pld	W	D*	L	GF	GA
(Oman) 2023	Final	1st	5	5	0	0	35	14
Total	1/1	1 title	5	5	0	0	35	14

=== FIH Hockey5s ===
FIH Hockey5s record
Year	Round	Position	Pld	W	D*	L	GF	GA
(Switzerland) 2022	Group stage	4th	4	1	1	2	12	14
Total	1/1	4th	4	1	1	2	12	14

== Honours ==
=== Major tournaments ===
- Hockey5s World Cup
  - (silver) Silver medal: 2024
- Hockey5s Asia Cup:
  - (gold) Champions: 2023

== Current squad ==
The following Indian team named for the 2024 FIH Hockey5s World Cup, held at Muscat, from 24 to 27 January 2024

Head coach: (India) Soundarya Yendala

Players, caps and goals updated as of 27 January 2024.

No.	Pos.	Player	Date of birth (age)	Caps	Goals	Club
10	GK	Bansari Solanki	24 May 2001 (age 25)	7		
13	GK	Rajani Etimarpu (Captain)	9 June 1990 (age 36)	10		
42	DF	Akshata Abaso Dhekale	2 November 2001 (age 24)	11	4	
68	DF	Mahima Choudhary	6 December 1999 (age 26)	15	9	
19	MF	Ajmina Kujur	9 December 2001 (age 24)	15	7	
20	FW	Deepika Soreng	17 December 2003 (age 22)	6	9	
64	FW	Jyoti Chhatri	8 March 2003 (age 23)	6	2	
38	FW	Mariana Kujur	20 April 1999 (age 27)	15	13	
17	FW	Mumtaz Khan	15 January 2003 (age 23)	10	11	
18	FW	Rutuja Pisal	28 November 2002 (age 23)	10	9	

== Individual records ==
=== Top goal scorers ===
Position	Player	Goals	Caps
1	Mariana Kujur	13	15
2	Mumtaz Khan	11	10
3	Rutuja Pisal	9	10
3	Mahima Choudhary	9	15
3	Deepika Soreng	9	6

=== Most goals for India in Hockey5s World Cup ===
Position	Player	Goals
1	Deepika Soreng	9
2	Rutuja Pisal	7
3	Mumtaz Khan	6
3	Mariana Kujur	6
5	Mahima Choudhary	3
5	Ajmina Kujur	3

== Head-to-head record ==
Won more matches than lost
All matches drawn
Won equal matches to lost
Lost more matches than won

=== Overall record ===
Record last updated as of the following match:

India vs Netherlands at Hockey Oman, Muscat in the 2024 Hockey5s World Cup, 27 January 2024

Opponent	GP	W	D	L	GF	GA	Win %	Last meeting
Japan	1	1	0	0	7	1	100%	2023
Malaysia	2	2	0	0	16	7	100%	2023
Namibia	1	1	0	0	7	2	100%	2024
Netherlands	1	0	0	1	2	7	0%	2024
New Zealand	1	1	0	0	11	1	100%	2024
Poland	2	1	0	1	6	7	50%	2024
South Africa	2	1	1	0	10	7	50%	2024
Switzerland	1	1	0	0	4	3	100%	2022
Thailand	2	2	0	0	12	6	100%	2023
United States	1	1	0	0	7	3	100%	2024
Uruguay	1	0	0	1	3	4	0%	2022
Total	15	11	1	3	85	48	73.33%	2024

== See also ==
Indian national hockey teams
Men's					Women's				
Senior	Under-21	Under-18	Senior Hockey5s	Under-18 hockey5s	Senior	Under-21	Under-18	Senior Hockey5s	Under-18 hockey5s

- Field hockey in India
- India national para hockey team
