= Hockey India =

Governing body of Field Hockey in India

- Sport: Field hockey
- Jurisdiction: India
- Founded: 2009; 17 years ago
- Affiliation: International Hockey Federation
- Affiliation date: 2017
- Regional affiliation: Asian Hockey Federation
- Affiliation date: 2011
- Headquarters: New Delhi, India
- President: Dilip Tirkey
- Vice president: Nitin Kohli
- Secretary: Bhola Nath Singh
- Men's coach: (South Africa) Craig Fulton
- Women's coach: (Netherlands) Sjoerd Marijne
- Replaced: Indian Hockey Federation; (1925–2008)

Official website
- hockeyindia.org
- (India)

Hockey India plans, directs and conducts all the activities for both men's and women's field hockey in India. It is recognized by the Ministry of Youth Affairs and Sports, Government of India as the sole body responsible towards promoting the sport. It was formed after the Indian Hockey Federation was dismissed in 2008.

Hockey India was established on 20 May 2009 and is affiliated to the International Hockey Federation (FIH), the Indian Olympic Association (IOA) and the Asian Hockey Federation (AHF).

Hockey India, with the assistance of the Sports Authority of India and Department of Sports, trains players at sub-junior, junior and senior level. The governing body is responsible for training the coaches, as well as educating and equipping technical officials and umpires.

Hockey India launched its own logo in a ceremony on 24 July 2008. It resembles the Ashok Chakra on the Indian flag. It is made up of hockey sticks.

Hockey India manages the following squads that represent India in international field hockey: the India men's national field hockey team, the India women's national field hockey team, the India men's national under-21 field hockey team, the India women's national under-21 field hockey team, the India men's national under-18 field hockey team and the India women's national under-18 field hockey team. It also manages India men's national hockey5s team, India women's national hockey5s team, India men's national under-18 hockey5's team and India women's national under-18 hockey5's team.

== Member units ==
Hockey India's member units are divided into four separate categories: permanent members, associate members, academy members and hockey members.

=== State and UT hockey associations ===
- Hockey Andaman and Nicobar
- Hockey Andhra Pradesh
- Hockey Arunachal
- Assam Hockey
- Hockey Bengal
- Hockey Association of Bihar
- Hockey Chandigarh
- Hockey Chhattisgarh
- Dadra & Nagar and Haveli & Daman & Diu Hockey
- Delhi Hockey
- Goans Hockey
- Hockey Gujarat
- Hockey Haryana
- Hockey Himachal
- Hockey Jammu and Kashmir
- Hockey Jharkhand
- Hockey Karnataka
- Hockey Keralam
- Hockey Madhya Pradesh
- Hockey Maharashtra
- Manipur Hockey
- Hockey Mizoram
- Hockey Nagaland
- Hockey Association of Odisha
- Le Puducherry Hockey
- Hockey Punjab
- Hockey Rajasthan
- Hockey Unit of Tamil Nadu
- Hockey Telangana
- Tripura Hockey
- Uttar Pradesh Hockey
- Hockey Uttarakhand

== Competitions ==
=== Hockey India National Championships ===
These National Championships are divided into two divisions, to ensure that participating teams are competing in a fair, equal environment, and against teams with similar level of skills.

Below is the list of National Championships that Hockey India conducts every season:

- Hockey India Senior Men National Championship
- Hockey India Senior Women National Championship
- Hockey India Junior Men National Championship
- Hockey India Junior Women National Championship
- Hockey India Sub-Junior Men National Championship
- Hockey India Sub-Junior Women National Championship
- Hockey India 5-a-side National Championship (women)
- Hockey India 5-a-side National Championship (men)
- Hockey India 5-a-side National Championship (mixed)

=== Leagues ===
- Hockey India League

=== All India hockey tournaments ===
- Beighton Cup
- Senior Nehru Hockey Tournament
- Surjit Memorial Hockey Tournament
- All India MCC Murugappa Gold Cup Hockey Tournament
- All India Obaidullah Khan Gold Cup Hockey Tournament
- Lal Bahadur Shastri Hockey Tournament
- All India Scindia Gold Cup Hockey Tournament
- All India Swami Shradhanand Hockey Tournament
- All India Guru Teg Bahadur Gold Cup Hockey Tournament
- Mahant Raja Sarwesjwardas Memorial All India Tournament
- All India Guru Gobind Singh Gold Cup Hockey Tournament
- All India Trades Cup Hockey Tournament
- All India Police Hockey Championship
- Aga Khan Hockey Tournament
- All India K.D Singh Babu Memorial Invitation Prize Money Hockey Tournament
- Lychettira Hockey Cup/Kodava Hockey Festival
- Bombay Gold Cup
- Liberals All India Hockey Tournament

== Executive board members ==
The following are the members of the executive board of Hockey India.

| Name | Position |
|---|---|
| Dilip Tirkey | President |
| Asima Ali | Vice president |
| SVS Subramanya Gupta | Vice president |
| Bhola Nath Singh | Secretary general |
| Sekar J. Manoharan | Treasurer |
| Arti Singh | Joint secretary |
| Sunil Malik | Joint secretary |
| Arun Kumar Saraswat | Executive board member |
| Asrita Lakra | Executive board member |
| Gurpreet Kaur | Executive board member |
| V Sunil Kumar | Executive board member |
| Tapan Kumar Das | Executive board member |

=== Officers and employees ===
The following are the officers and employees of Hockey India.

- Cdr R. K. Srivastava – director general
- B. N. Bhushan – director
- Ranjit Gill – director
- Vikram Singh – director - competitions & hockey development
- Kuldeep Singh – joint director
- Rakesh Kumar – joint director
- Ahad Azim – joint director
- Sneha Singh - Manager Media
- Jaspreet Singh – officer in charge - media & communications
- Mahender Singh Negi – manager - purchase & administration
- Bhupender Singh – manager - coordination
- Ankit Walia – manager coordination
- Priyanka Yadav – PA to DG
- Vaishali Rathore – senior officer coordination
- Bhagyashree Das – officer coordination
- Amit Rai – IT executive
- Manohar Lal – office assistant
- Davender Kumar Sharma – project manager - CSR

== Past office bearers ==
=== Presidents ===
The following is a list of presidents of the Indian Hockey Federation and Hockey India:

| President | Tenure |
|---|---|
Indian Hockey Federation (1925–2008)
| Col. Bruce Turnbull | 1925–1927 |
| Major Ian Burn-Murdoch | 1927–1930 |
| R. E. Powell | 1930–1931 |
| A. M. Hayman | 1931–1934 |
| Joseph William Bhore | 1934–1935 |
| Kunwar Jagdish Prasad | 1935–1936 |
| N. N. Sircar | 1936–1938 |
| Mohd. Zaffurullah Khan | 1938–1939 |
| Khwaja Nazimuddin | 1939–1944 |
| Azizul Haque | 1944–1946 |
| Naval Tata | 1946–1958 |
| Ashwini Kumar | 1958–1974 |
| M. A. M. Ramaswamy | 1974–1980 |
| I. M. Mahajan | 1980–1983 |
| Raja Bhupinder Singh | 1983–1985 |
| M. A. M. Ramaswamy | 1985–1987 |
| R. Prasad | 1987–1994 |
| Kanwar Pal Singh Gill | 1994–2008 |
Hockey India (since 2009)
| A. K. Mattoo | 2009–2010 |
| Vidya Stokes | 2010 |
| Narinder Batra (interim) | 2010 |
| Mariamma Koshy | 2010–2014 |
| Narinder Batra | 2014–2016 |
| Mariamma Koshy | 2016–2018 |
| Rajinder Singh (interim) | 2018 |
| Mohd Mushtaque Ahmad | 2018–2020 |
| Gyanendro Ningombam | 2020–2022 |
| Dilip Tirkey | 2022–present |

== Hockey India Awards ==
Hockey India instituted the Hockey India Awards from 2014 for recognition of hockey players for promoting field hockey as a sport on the national and international platform.

Major Dhyan Chand Lifetime Achievement Award

- 2014: Balbir Singh Sr.
- 2015: Shankar Lakshman
- 2019: Harbinder Singh
- 2022: Amit Singh Bakshi
- 2023: Gurbux Singh

Balbir Singh Sr. Award for Player of the Year (Men)

- 2014: Birendra Lakra
- 2015: P. R. Sreejesh
- 2019: Manpreet Singh
- 2022: Harmanpreet Singh
- 2023: Hardik Singh

Balbir Singh Sr. Award for Player of the Year (Women)

- 2014: Vandana Katariya
- 2015: Deepika Thakur
- 2019: Rani Rampal
- 2022: Savita Punia
- 2023: Savita Punia

Jugraj Singh Award for Upcoming Player of the Year (U21 Men)

- 2014: Harmanpreet Singh
- 2015: Harjeet Singh
- 2019: Vivek Sagar Prasad
- 2022: Sanjay Rana
- 2023: Uttam Singh

Asunta Lakra Award for Upcoming Player of the Year (U21 Women)

- 2014: Namita Toppo
- 2015: Preeti Dubey
- 2019: Lalremsiami
- 2022: Salima Tete
- 2023: Mumtaz Khan

Dhanraj Pillay Award for Forward of the Year

- 2014: Akashdeep Singh
- 2015: Rani Rampal
- 2019: Mandeep Singh
- 2022: Vandana Katariya
- 2023: Vandana Katariya

Ajit Pal Singh Award for Midfielder of the Year

- 2014: Manpreet Singh
- 2015: Ritu Rani
- 2019: Neha Goyal
- 2022: Manpreet Singh
- 2023: Sushila Chanu

Pargat Singh Award for Defender of the Year

- 2014: Deepika Thakur
- 2015: Kothajit Singh
- 2019: Harmanpreet Singh
- 2022: Deep Grace Ekka and Amit Rohidas
- 2023: Harmanpreet Singh

Baljit Singh Award for Goalkeeper of the Year

- 2014: P. R. Sreejesh
- 2015: Savita Punia
- 2019: Krishan Pathak
- 2022: P. R. Sreejesh
- 2023: Krishan Pathak

Jaman Lal Sharma Award for Invaluable Contribution

- 2014: Harendra Singh
- 2015: Baldev Singh
- 2019: Sports Authority of India
- 2022: BG Joshi
- 2023: Pritam Rani Siwach

Hockey India President's Award for Outstanding Achievement

- 2014: One Thousand Hockey Legs
- 2015: Madhya Pradesh Hockey Academy
- 2019: Department of Sports & Youth Services, Government of Odisha
- 2022: Vandana Katariya
- 2023: Hockey Ace Foundation

Hockey India President's Award for Technical Official

- 2022: Harkirat Singh Sokhi
- 2023: Mohammad Moghul Muneer

Hockey India President's Award for Umpire / Umpire Manager

- 2022: Raghuprasad RV
- 2023: Gurinder Singh Sangha
