= Railways Sports Promotion Board =

Indian Railways organisation

- Sport: Multi-sport
- Jurisdiction: Indian Railways
- Membership: USIC
- Abbreviation: RSPB
- Founded: 1928
- Affiliation: AAI; AFI; AICF; AIFF; AITA; BAI; BCCI; BFI; BoxFI; BSFI; CFI; HFI; HI; IPF; IWF; JFI; NRAI; SFI; TTFI; VFI; WFI
- Regional affiliation: India
- Headquarters: 457, Floor IV Rail Bhavan, Ministry of Railways
- Location: New Delhi, India
- President: R. Rajagopal

Official website
- www.indianrailways.gov.in

Railways Sports Promotion Board (RSPB; formerly known as Railways Sports Control Board) is a sports board run by the Indian Railways. It was formed as the Indian Railways Athletic Association in 1928. It promotes 30 sporting disciplines and owns the Karnail Singh Stadium in New Delhi. The board is represented as Railways in the National Games of India.

== Overview ==
RSPB is a member of the Board of Control for Cricket in India and fields the Railways cricket team in domestic cricket competitions such as the Ranji Trophy. The RSPB is an associate member of the All India Football Federation and fields the Railways football team in Santosh Trophy. It is also an associate of the Badminton Association of India.

Apart from domestic cricket and football, RSPB has played host to national level events such as the National Weightlifting Championship in 2004, the National Boxing Championship in 2007 and the 56th National Kabaddi Championship in 2004. In 2009, RSPB held the 17th Men's and 14th Women's USIC World Railway Athletics Championship. In the run up to the 2010 Commonwealth Games, the RSPB in coordination with the Ministry of Communications and Information Technology ran a special train, The Commonwealth Express, which toured India to promote the games.

== Railways teams ==
=== Basketball ===
- Railways basketball team
- Railways women's basketball team

=== Cricket ===
- Railways cricket team
- Railways women's cricket team

=== Football ===
- Railways football team
- Railways women's football team
- Eastern Railway FC

=== Hockey ===
- Railways hockey team
- Railways women's hockey team

== See also ==
- Indian Railways
- Ministry of Railways
- Services Sports Control Board
- Sports Authority of India
