= Women's Hockey5s Asia Cup =

- Most recent season or competition: 2023 Women's Asian Hockey5s World Cup Qualifier
- Sport: Hockey5s
- Founded: 2023; 3 years ago
- First season: 2023
- No. of teams: 10
- Confederation: AHF (Asia)
- Most recent champion: India (2023)
- Most titles: India (1 Title)

The Women's Hockey5s Asia Cup (Women's Asian Hockey5s World Cup Qualifier) is a women's international Hockey5's tournament organized by the Asian Hockey Federation. The event is played in Hockey 5s format, a 5-a-side game that is played on a smaller field size. The winning team becomes the champion of Asia and qualifies for the FIH Hockey5s World Cup.

The first edition took place in Salalah from 25–28 August 2023, won by India.

== Results ==
#	Year	Host	Final			Third place match			Teams
#	Year	Host	Winner	Score	Runner-up	Third place	Score	Fourth place	Teams
1	2023; Details	Salalah, Oman	India	7–2	Thailand	Malaysia	4–4 (2–1 p.s.o.)	Indonesia	10

== Successful national teams ==
Teams reaching the top four
Team	Champions	Runners-up	Third place	Fourth place
India	1 (2023)			
Thailand		1 (2023)		
Malaysia			1 (2023)	
Indonesia				1 (2023)

* = host country

=== Team appearances ===
Team	(Oman) 2023	Total
Bangladesh	8th	1
Chinese Taipei	7th	1
Hong Kong	6th	1
India	1st	1
Indonesia	4th	1
Iran	9th	1
Japan	5th	1
Malaysia	3rd	1
Oman	10th	1
Thailand	2nd	1
Total (10)	10	

=== Debut of teams ===
Year	Debutants	Total
2023	Bangladesh, Chinese Taipei, Hong Kong, India, Indonesia, Iran, Japan, Malaysia, Oman, Thailand	10
Total		10

== See also ==
- Men's Hockey5s Asia Cup
- Women's U18 Hockey5's Asia Cup
