= FIH Women's Hockey5s World Cup =

Field hockey 5s tournament

- Most recent season or competition: 2024 Women's FIH Hockey5s World Cup
- Sport: Hockey5s
- Founded: 2019; 7 years ago
- First season: 2024
- No. of teams: 16
- Continent: International (FIH)
- Most recent champion: Netherlands (1st title) (2024)
- Most titles: Netherlands (1 title)
- Qualification: Continental championships
- Website: Hockey5s World Cup

The FIH Women's Hockey5s World Cup is an international field hockey competition organised by the International Hockey Federation (FIH). The tournament began in 2024.

The first edition was held in 2024 in Muscat, Oman and was won by the Netherlands who defeated India 7–2 in the final.

== History ==
The executive board of the International Hockey Federation (FIH) decided to organize the FIH Hockey5s World Cup in 2019. In June 2021, the FIH awarded Oman to be the host the inaugural edition of the tournament in 2024.

== Results ==
Year	Host	Final			Third place match			Number of teams
Year	Host	Winner	Score	Runner-up	Third place	Score	Fourth place	Number of teams
2024; Details	Muscat, Oman	Netherlands	7–2	India	Poland	4–2	South Africa	16

== Team appearances ==
Team	(Oman) 2024	Total
Australia	11th	1
India	2nd	1
Fiji	12th	1
Malaysia	6th	1
Namibia	10th	1
Netherlands	1st	1
New Zealand	8th	1
Oman	16th	1
Paraguay	14th	1
Poland	3rd	1
South Africa	4th	1
Ukraine	7th	1
United States	9th	1
Uruguay	5th	1
Thailand	13th	1
Zambia	15th	1
Total	16	

== See also ==
- FIH Men's Hockey5s World Cup
- Women's FIH Youth Hockey5s World Cup
