= History of field hockey =

Field hockey is a popular game possibly depicted on walls in Egypt. Drawings of what looks to be hockey have been found in an Egyptian tomb that was 4000 years old. Hockey is a popular game in India and Pakistan. Hockey is similar to an ancient game played predominantly in Scotland called shinty. Also, bandy was called "hockey on ice" in the beginning, as it was considered an ice variety of hockey. Hockey is often played at schools in the UK but its origins are unclear. Later came ice hockey, which developed in Canada.

In Inner Mongolia, China, the Daur people have been playing Beikou (a game similar to modern field hockey) for about 1,000 years. European settlers in Chile in the 16th century described a hockey-like game of the Araucano Indians called chueca (or 'the twisted one' from the twisted end of the stick used by players). In Western Australia, early white settlers witnessed Noongar people played a game called dumbung, in which bent sticks were used to hit a ball made of dried sap from the native peartree. (The game is believed to be the source of the name of Dumbleyung, a town near where it was played.) In Punjab, there is a traditional hockey-like game known as khido khundi, roughly translating to "ball and blunt stick"

== Modern hockey ==
A game called hockey was played in English public schools in the early 19th century. Lord Lytton wrote in 1853 that On the common some young men were playing at hockey. That old-fashioned game, now very uncommon in England, except at schools.... Hockey's popularity increased with that of other team games. A version of the game played in south-east London was rougher than the modern version, played on a very large field (247m by 64m), and used a cube of black rubber and rough planed sticks. The modern game was developed on the other side of London by Middlesex cricket clubs, especially Teddington Hockey Club. The members of these clubs were looking for winter exercise, but did not particularly care for football. In 1870, members of the Teddington cricket club, who had recently moved to play in Bushy Park, were looking for a winter activity. They experimented with a 'stick' game, based loosely on the rules of association football. Teddington played the game on the smooth outfield of their cricket pitch and used a cricket ball, so allowing smooth and predictable motion. By 1874 they had begun to draw up rules for their game, including banning the raising of the stick above shoulder height and stipulating that a shot at goal must take place within the circle in front of it. An association was formed in 1875, which dissolved after seven years, but in 1886 the Hockey Association was formed by seven London clubs and representatives from Trinity College, Cambridge. Blackheath were one of the founder members, but refused to accept the rules drawn up by the other clubs and left to found the National Hockey Union. The Union failed, but the Association grew rapidly.

They rejected a form of the game that involved a 7 oz (200 g) rubber cube, catching, marking and scrimmaging, based on rugby football, at the time favoured by the Blackheath club. The Teddington club chose to limit the number per side to eleven, and preferred to play with old cricket balls. They also introduced the idea of the striking circle ('the dee' or 'D'), and they played several games in Bushy Park, in the winter of 1871. Clubs were also set up in Richmond and Surbiton in 1874, and inter-club matches were played between them and Teddington. The game grew sporadically, as the clubs did not always agree on the rules.

The University Match between the University of Oxford and University of Cambridge first took place in 1890, one of the oldest varsity matches between the two universities.

In the late 19th century, largely due to the British Army, the game spread throughout the British Empire, leading to the first international competition in 1895 (Ireland 3, Wales 0). The International Rules Board was founded in 1895, and hockey first appeared at the Olympic Games as a men's competition at 1908 Olympic Games in London, with only three teams: England, Ireland and Scotland. Men's hockey became a permanent fixture at the Olympics at the 1928 Olympic Games, at Amsterdam.

The first step towards an international structuring occurred in 1909, when England and Belgium agreed to recognize each other for international competitions, soon joined in by the French federation. In 1924, the International Hockey Federation (FIH, Fédération Internationale de Hockey) was founded in Paris, under the initiative of the French man, Paul Léautey, as a response to hockey's omission from the 1924 Paris Games. The founding members were Austria, Belgium, Czechoslovakia, France, Hungary, Spain, and Switzerland. The development of the FIH owes a lot to the work of Réné George Frank, a Belgian, in the years after the Second World War until the 1970s. Men's hockey united under the FIH in 1970, when the Hockey Association joined and the International Rules Board became part of the FIH's structure.

The game had been taken to India by British servicemen, and the first clubs formed there in Calcutta in 1885. The Beighton Cup and the Aga Khan tournament had commenced within ten years. Entering the Olympic Games in 1928, India won all five of its games without conceding a goal, and went on to win in 1932 until 1956, and then in 1964 and 1980. Pakistan won in 1960, 1968, and 1984.

== Women's hockey ==
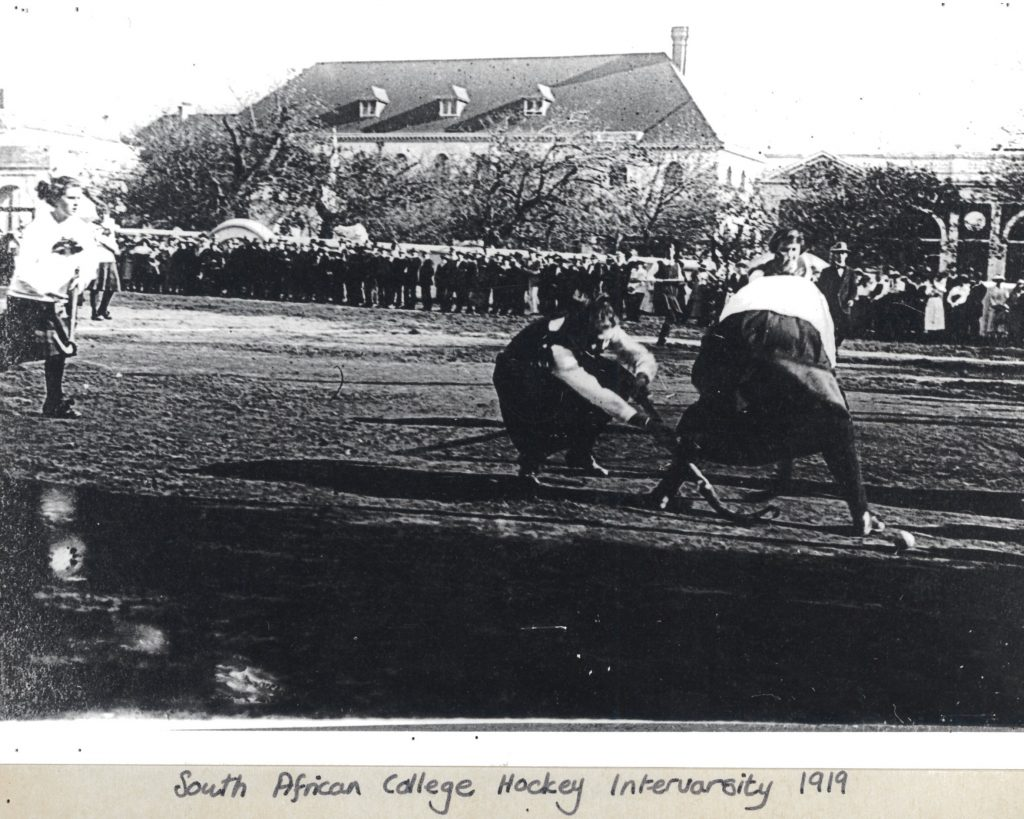
South African College Intervarsity Ladies Hockey Team, 1919

Women's hockey developed separately from men's hockey. Women do not seem to have played hockey widely before the modern era. Women's hockey was first played at British Universities and schools, and the first club, Molesey Ladies Hockey Club, was founded in 1887. The first national association was the Irish Ladies Hockey Union in 1894, and though rebuffed by the Hockey Association, women's hockey grew rapidly around the world. The women's University Match between the University of Oxford and University of Cambridge first took place in 1895, making it the oldest varsity match in the world for women.

The International Federation of Women's Hockey Associations (IFWHA) was established in 1927, though this did not include initially many continental European countries where women played as sections of men's associations and were affiliated to the FIH. The IFWHA held conferences every three years, and the tournaments associated with these were the primary IFWHA competitions. These tournaments were non-competitive until 1975.

By the early 1970s there were 22 associations with women's sections in the FIH and 36 associations in the IFWHA. Discussions were started about a common rule book. The FIH introduced competitive tournaments in 1974, forcing the acceptance of the principle of competitive hockey by the IFWHA in 1973. It took until 1982 for the two bodies to merge, but this allowed the introduction of women's hockey to the 1980 Olympic Games, where, as in the men's game, Australia, Germany, and the Netherlands have been consistently strong. Due to the 1980 Summer Olympics boycott by many of the dominant nations at the time, Zimbabwe won the inaugural women's event with a fully amateur team.

Since 1980 women's attire has changed with miniskirts replacing pleated skirts for female outfield players and umpires, but concerns of embarrassment for girls led to shorts being allowed from 2023 onwards.

== The synthetic revolution ==
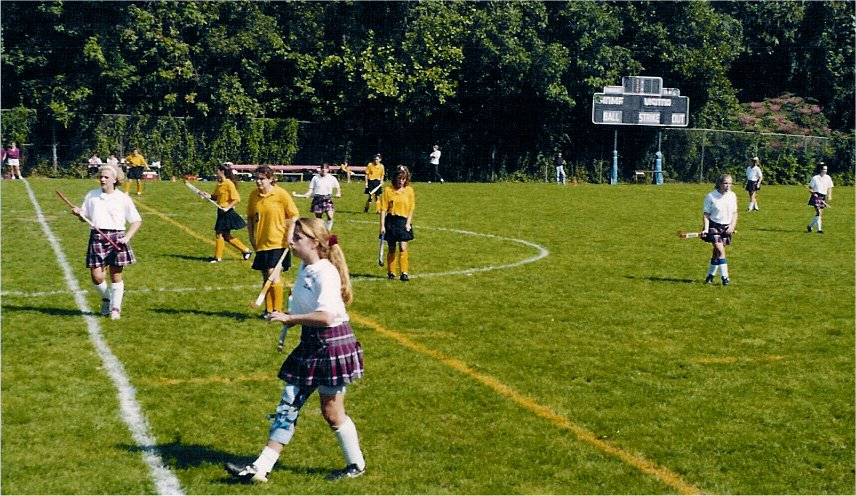
Grass Playing Surface

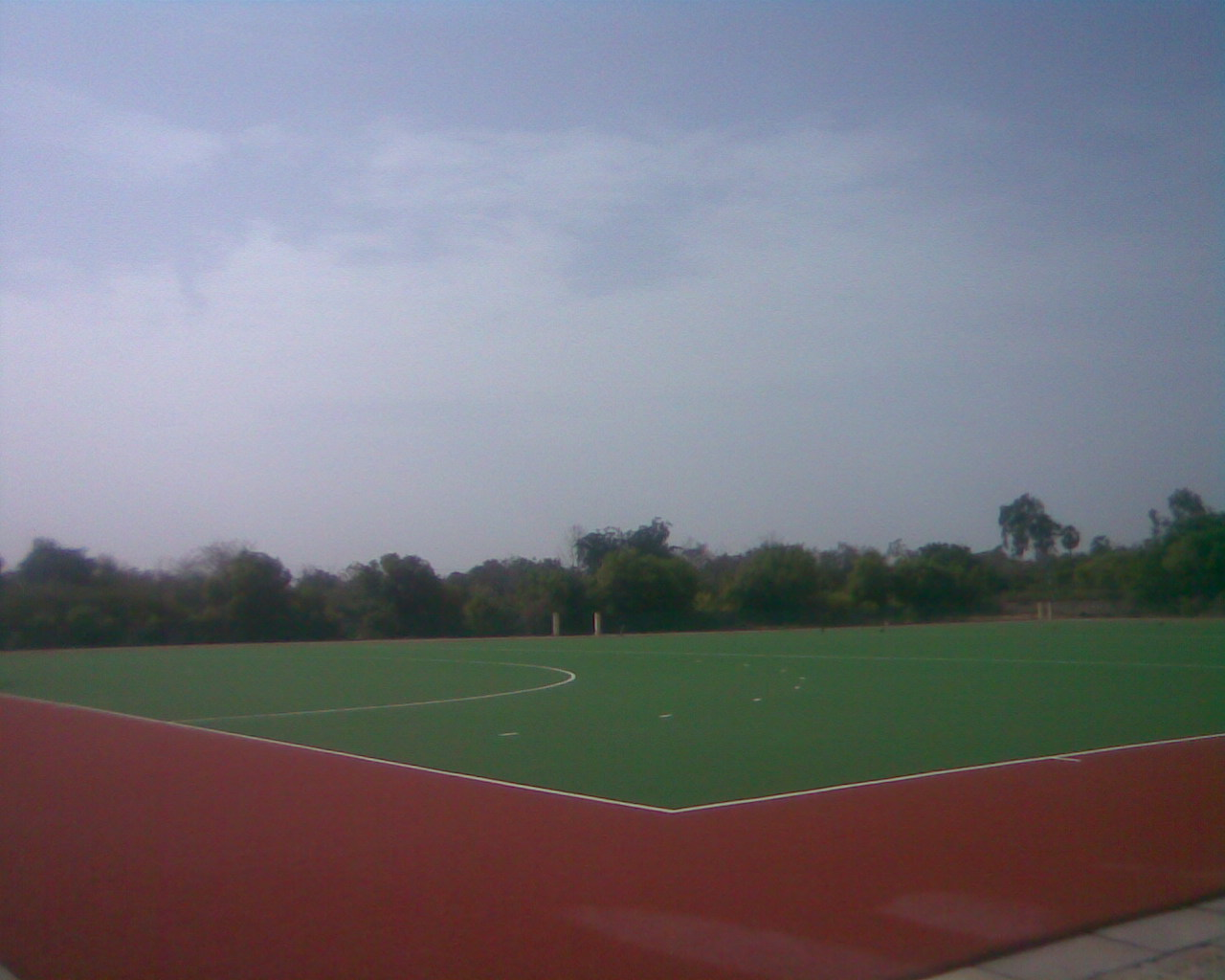
Synthetic turf at Anna Stadium, Trichy

In the early 1970s, the "synthetic grass" fields began to be used for hockey, with the first Olympic Games on this surface being held at the 1976 Montreal edition.

Synthetic pitches are now mandatory for all international tournaments and most national competitions. While hockey is still played on grass fields at some local levels and lesser national divisions, it has been replaced by synthetic turf almost everywhere in the western world.

The introduction of artificial surfaces has changed the game. To take into account the specificities of this surface, new tactics and new techniques (such as the Indian dribble) have been developed and new rules have been introduced to control these new techniques.

Regarding the evolution of the hockey player material, the sticks have changed shape, with the bent head at the bottom, which used to be about 15 centimetres long, becoming much stubbier. The extra length was no longer necessary, as the ball travelled much straighter on the flatter synthetic fields. The shorter length made playing the ball with the "backhand" (playing with the head of the stick to the player's left, with the head rotated 180 degrees from its usual position) much easier, increasing the speed with which this tactic, often used for evasive manoeuvres, could be used. It also makes trapping the ball by placing the entire stick on the ground, with the point of the head resting on the ground to the player's left, possible, and this stopping technique is now universal for trapping the ball at penalty corners. The sticks have also tended to become stiffer as to hit the ball harder. Fibreglass, carbon fibre and kevlar were first applied to the traditional wood core in the early 1970s. Sticks with an aluminium core have been produced but are now prohibited due to the danger they pose when broken. Wooden sticks are less and less common, and players are now playing with sticks entirely made of synthetic composite materials.

The goalkeeper equipment has followed the same trend, becoming more and more able to resist to strength of the balls hit by these new generation sticks. Helmets have become compulsory, padding is thicker and of more shock-absorbing (and reflecting) foam material and more areas of the body are padded. The new equipment is very expensive and is often a considerable burden for clubs or individual goalkeepers to purchase. The composition of the hockey ball has also changed, from a leather ball with a seam similar to a cricket ball, to a seamless, usually dimpled hard plastic ball. These plastic balls are cheaper, more durable, more consistent in their behaviour, and are unaffected by water; a key requirement in water-moderated synthetic fields used in elite-level hockey.

Ancillary player equipment has also changed. The studded boots for grass fields are banned (and were in any case very uncomfortable) on synthetics, and have been replaced with boots specifically designed for synthetic turf. Shin guards have improved padding. Many players have taken to wearing padded gloves, particularly on their left hand, both to protect against contact and allow them to scrape that hand (while holding the stick) across the synthetic turf without injury. Finally, the wearing of mouthguards to protect the teeth is now compulsory for safety in many countries.

== Rules ==
The rules of the game have widely changed. The main issues have been

- To adapt the game to the new synthetic fields introduced in the 1980s.
- To enhance comprehension from non-players to gain TV coverage

Some of these rules changes:

- The FIH eliminated the offside rule (similar to offside in football) in the mid-1990s to increase scoring opportunities.
- Constant modifications of the penalty corner rules to minimize its importance in the game and its readability.
- Limitation of the bow of sticks to limit the increasing use and power of drag flicks.
