= Umpire (field hockey) =

An umpire in field hockey is a person with the authority to make decisions on a hockey pitch in accordance with the rules of the game. Each match is controlled by two such umpires. In theory they are responsible for decisions taken on their respective half of the field, but practically they "control' on either diagonal half of the field. In many higher-level events, a "reserve umpire" is appointed in addition to the two "field umpires" to act as a back-up in the event of injury or other issue preventing a field umpire from commencing or continuing a match. In World-Level competitions, a video umpire is also appointed in addition to the field and reserve umpires.

== Role and positioning ==
Diagram of a hockey field

The role of the umpires is to control the match, apply the rules of hockey, uphold a duty of care to the players (keeping the game safe), be the judges of fair play and keep the flow. Each umpire has the primary responsibility for decisions in one half of the field, and is the only one allowed to award a penalty corner, penalty stroke or goal in their half of the field or a free hit in their circle (see diagram). However, they may consult with their colleague before making these decisions. They must also ensure that the correct amount of time is allowed for the match and record the scoring of goals and issuing of penalty cards to players. Similarly to football referees, most decisions are signalled using a whistle (and the use of the whistle is specifically instructed in the Rules), and the use of various hand signals.

Originally their half of the field was taken to coincide with the two halves of the pitch as divided by the halfway line. Now the division is generally taken to run down the diagonal of the pitch, from top left to bottom right in the accompanying pitch diagram. For breaches of the rules bordering the umpires' 'area of control', jurisdiction is generally given to whichever umpire the play is coming towards. When play is in and around their shooting circle, the umpire will generally take up a position in the shooting circle, particularly if play has come from the further side of the pitch, and when play is more in the middle of the pitch will be closer to the right-hand sideline (facing the goal for which they are responsible). Positioning in the shooting circle is critical as correct decisions are necessary here to maintain the control of the match as well as the outcome. Exact positioning will be determined by the need to keep the ball in view, the desire to be reasonably close to the ball and the relative pace of the game. The preferred position of most umpires is behind and to the right of the play as the lead umpire, whilst the other umpire (the trailing umpire) is around 15 m behind at a 45-degree angle with the engaged umpire.

== History ==
The early history of hockey officiating is quite similar to that of football refereeing: decisions could only be made on appeal by the players (compare with cricket where this is still the case for some decisions); and if no dedicated official was available the team captain could act as an umpire in addition to playing. Over time it has come to be desirable that the umpires should be neutral, although many matches are still played with one umpire from each club involved in the game.

== Uniform ==
Umpires are required by the Rules to wear clothing of "similar colours to one another, but different from those of both teams".

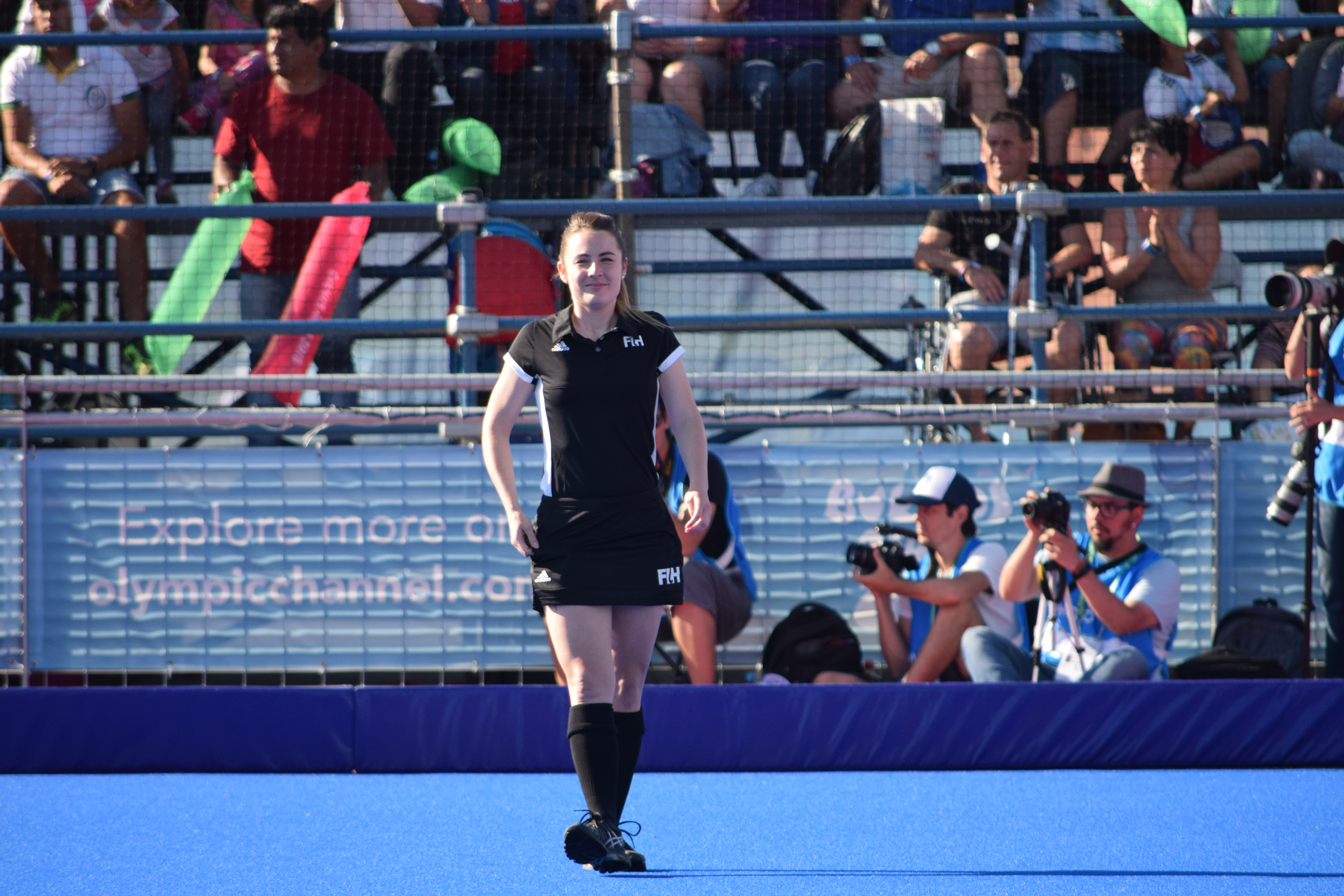
Rhiannon Murrie (AUS) - Umpire. 2018 Summer Youth Olympics, Gold Medal Match (Girls)

In practice, umpires appointed by their Association, National body or the FIH wear black slacks (male) or a black skirt with knee-high black socks (female). In club competitions, particularly in colder climates, females often adopt the black pants instead of a skirt. Each competition has its own approved umpiring shirt, sometimes with various colour options and sometimes with different shirts for different competition divisions (for example, the premier league may have a different shirt to the remainder of the competition).

In February 2012, Grays International became the new supplier of official's uniforms (including umpiring shirts) for FIH competitions, replacing TK. Grays manufacture three colours of umpire shirts for international matches - red, yellow and blue. Previous colours used by the FIH include cerise, turquoise and yellow (circa 2005) and fuchsia, turquoise and purple (circa 2000).

== Video umpires ==
In FIH World-Level competitions, where facilities are available, a video umpire is appointed in addition to the field and reserve umpires. The scope of the video umpire's role is restricted to making decisions as to whether or not a goal has been legally scored. To this end, the video umpire may assist in decisions to determine:

- whether the ball crossed the goal line (within the area bounded by the goal posts and crossbar);
- whether the ball was legally played or touched inside the circle by the stick of an attacker and did not travel outside the circle before passing completely over the goal-line and under the cross-bar;
- whether the ball travelled outside the circle before it entered the goal from a shot by an attacker during the taking of a penalty corner;
- whether a breach of the Rules has been observed within the attacking 23 metre area in the play leading to the awarding or disallowing of a goal. It is then for the Match Umpire to take any breach into account in reaching their decision.

Decisions may be referred to the video umpire upon the request of a player of either team, or directly by a field umpire. Each team is permitted one video umpire referral per match, which is retained if the referral is successful and forfeited if the referral is unsuccessful. There is no limit to the number of field umpire referrals in a match.
