= Short corner =

A short corner can be either:

- A penalty corner in field hockey
- A strategy in taking a corner kick in association football
