= Penalty shoot-out (field hockey) =

Method used in field hockey to decide the winner of a drawn match

In field hockey, a penalty shootout is a method used to decide which team progresses to the next stage of a tournament (or wins the tournament) following a tied game. Two methods have been used: the original penalty stroke competition is a best-of-five penalty strokes with sudden death if scores were level after five strokes. An alternate penalty shoot-out competition was introduced at major tournaments in 2011. Sometimes known as a penalty shuffle, the method is similar to penalty shots in ice hockey and consists of one-on-ones between an attacking player and a goalkeeper. Up to 2013, up to two 7.5-minute golden goal periods were played first; that method ceased after.

== Penalty stroke competition (before 2011) ==
To determine matches that end in a tie, a penalty stroke competition was used. Similar to a penalty shoot-out in association football, teams alternately take penalty strokes, subject to the normal rules, to determine the winner. Each team is represented by any five players chosen from the team sheet submitted prior to the match (Note: A player suspended from the tournament or the match by a red card is not eligible to participate in the penalty stroke or penalty shoot-out competition.) and the order in which they participate is also chosen. Players from each team take alternate strokes in a best-of-five competition until a team has won or 10 strokes have been completed. The goal used is selected by the umpires and the team to take the first penalty stroke is determined by a coin toss. In the result of a tie after 10 strokes, the same players (Note: Incapacitated players may be replaced. A player suspended during the penalty stroke or penalty shoot-out competition takes no further part. For offensive players their turn counts as no goal; if they are a goalkeeper they can be replaced by one of the five nominated players.) will continue to take strokes in a sudden death format until a winner is established. The order in which players take strokes may change and the team that started first in the shoot-out goes second for the duration of sudden death strokes.

== Penalty shoot-out competition (since 2011) ==
Similar to a penalty shot in ice hockey, the attacker gets a chance to run with the ball in a one-on-one situation against the goalkeeper. The attacker starts on the 23-metre line with the ball and the goalkeeper starts on the goal line. When the whistle is blown, both can move and the attacker has 8 seconds to score a goal. Unlike a penalty stroke or penalty corner there are no restrictions on strokes the attacker may use to score and a goal is scored in the usual way. If the attacker commits an offence, the ball travels outside the field of play, (Note: Unlike the normal rules of hockey, it is not an offense for a goalkeeper to deliberately play the ball over the backline in a shoot-out.) or 8 seconds elapse before the ball crosses the line a goal is not awarded. If the goalkeeper unintentionally fouls the attacker then the penalty shoot-out is re-taken; in the event the foul was intentional a penalty stroke is awarded.

Just like its predecessor, the penalty shoot-out uses five players chosen from each team against a goalkeeper. It is a best-of-five competition and, if scores are tied at the end of this, it progresses to sudden-death with the same players until a winner is established. Which goal to use is chosen by umpires and which team starts is determined by a coin toss. Sudden-death is started by the team that did not start the shoot-out and players may proceed in a different order from the best-of-five.

== History ==
The first Olympic match to be decided by a penalty stroke competition was during the 1972 Summer Olympics in the 11th-place classification match when Poland defeated France. Following the introduction of women's hockey to the Olympics in 1992, the first Olympic women's penalty stroke competition was at the 1996 Summer Olympics and decided the bronze medal match between Great Britain and the Netherlands. However, penalty strokes had already long been used in the Women's Hockey World Cup which started in 1974; notably, the winner (West Germany) of the 1981 final was determined by this method.

Penalty shoot-outs using a one-on-one had previously been trialled in the Australian Hockey League since 2001. Alternate tie-breaking methods were also tested; these including a trial in domestic Australian leagues where an extra time situation was used where "players from both teams are reduced gradually" after a fixed amount of time—the idea being that this creates space for a goal to be scored. The Euro Hockey League used shoot-outs since its inaugural 2007–08 season and that year's match for third-place was determined using a shoot-out. The International Hockey Federation's view was that the shoot-outs "better replicate real game situations and tend to require more skill" and were a better method of tie-breaking.

In April 2011, the International Hockey Federation announced that a penalty shoot-out competition would replace the penalty stroke competition and the first major tournament to feature this tie-breaking procedure was the 2011 Women's Hockey Champions Challenge II; the first penalty shoot-out occurred in the 3rd place match with Belarus defeating Chile 3–1 in the shoot-out. The second shoot-out was used to determine the 3rd place match in 2011 Women's Hockey Champions Challenge I. The Champions Trophy is the premier annual hockey tournament and the first time a shoot-out was used in the competition was to determine the winner of the women's 2011 tournament; Netherlands won the shoot-out 3–2 against Argentina. The first Olympics to feature the penalty shoot-out was London 2012; they were not required in the men's tournament but was used once in the women's tournament where the Netherlands progressed from their semi-final against New Zealand.

== See also ==
- Penalty stroke
- Penalty corner
