= Field hockey =

Team sport played with sticks and a ball

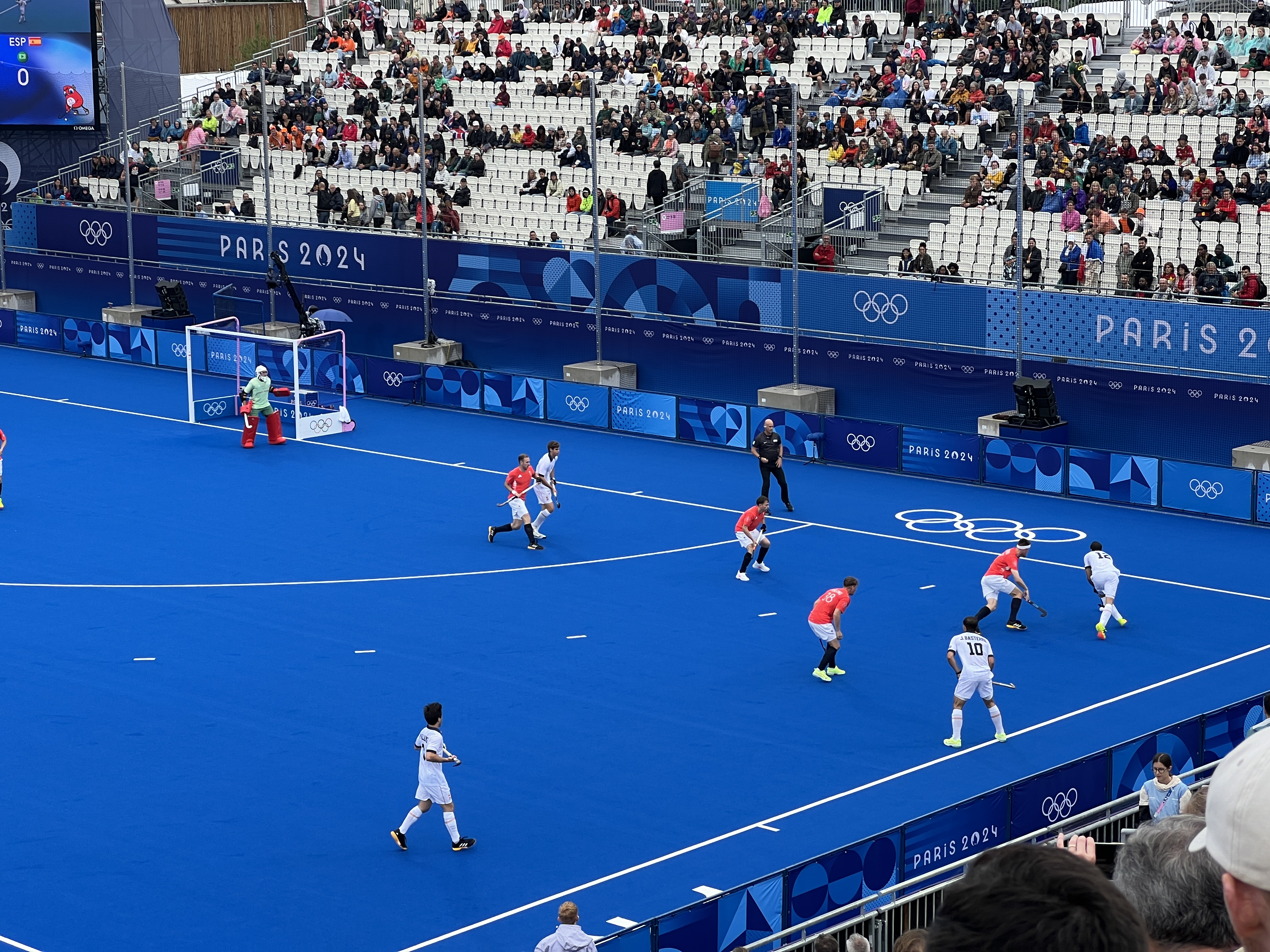
- Field hockey at the 2024 Summer Olympics
- Highest governing body: International Hockey Federation
- First played: 19th-century England

Characteristics
- Contact: Limited
- Team members: 10 outfield players and 1 goalkeeper drawn from a squad of however many
- Type: Outdoor and indoor
- Equipment: Hockey ball, hockey stick, mouthguard, shin guards, glove, and goalkeeper kit

Presence
- Olympic: 1908, 1920, 1928–present

Pictogram for Field hockey at the Summer Olympics

Hockey, or field hockey in North America, is a fast-paced team sport in which two teams of eleven players (ten field players and one goalkeeper) use curved sticks to maneuver a small, hard hockey ball towards the rival team's shooting circle and then into the goal. The team with the most goals at the end of play wins the match.

Matches are played on grass, watered turf, or artificial turf, although grass has become increasingly rare as a playing surface. Indoor hockey is usually played on a synthetic hard court or hardwood sports flooring, and beach field hockey is played on sand.

The stick has evolved significantly over the game's history in its composition and shape. Wooden sticks, though once standard, have become increasingly uncommon as technological advancements have made synthetic materials cheaper. Today, sticks are typically made of a combination of carbon fibre, fibreglass, and aramid, in varying proportions. At the elite level, sticks with a very high carbon content are near universally preferred. The stick has two sides; one rounded and one flat; only the flat face of the stick is allowed to progress the ball. If the ball is "played" with the rounded part of the stick (i.e., stopped or hit), it will result in a penalty, though accidental touches are not an offence as long as they do not materially affect play. Goalkeepers often have a different design of stick, which are designed to maximise surface area within the legal limits of the game, though they also cannot play the ball with the round side of their stick. Goalkeepers are allowed to touch the ball with any part of their body when inside their shooting circle. No other player is allowed to touch the ball except with their stick, though a player's hand is considered part of the stick if holding the stick.

The modern game was developed at public schools in 19th-century England and it is now played globally. The governing body is the International Hockey Federation (FIH), called the Fédération Internationale de Hockey in French. Men and women are represented internationally in competitions including the Olympic Games, World Cup, FIH Pro League, Junior World Cup and in past also World League, Champions Trophy. Many countries run extensive junior, senior, and masters club competitions. The FIH is also responsible for organizing the Hockey Rules Board and developing the sport's rules.

The sport is known simply as hockey in many countries. In Sweden and Finland, the term landhockey and maahockey respectively are used, translating to "ground" hockey in opposition to the more standard ice hockey variant. A popular variant is indoor hockey, which differs in a number of respects while embodying the primary principles of hockey.

== History ==
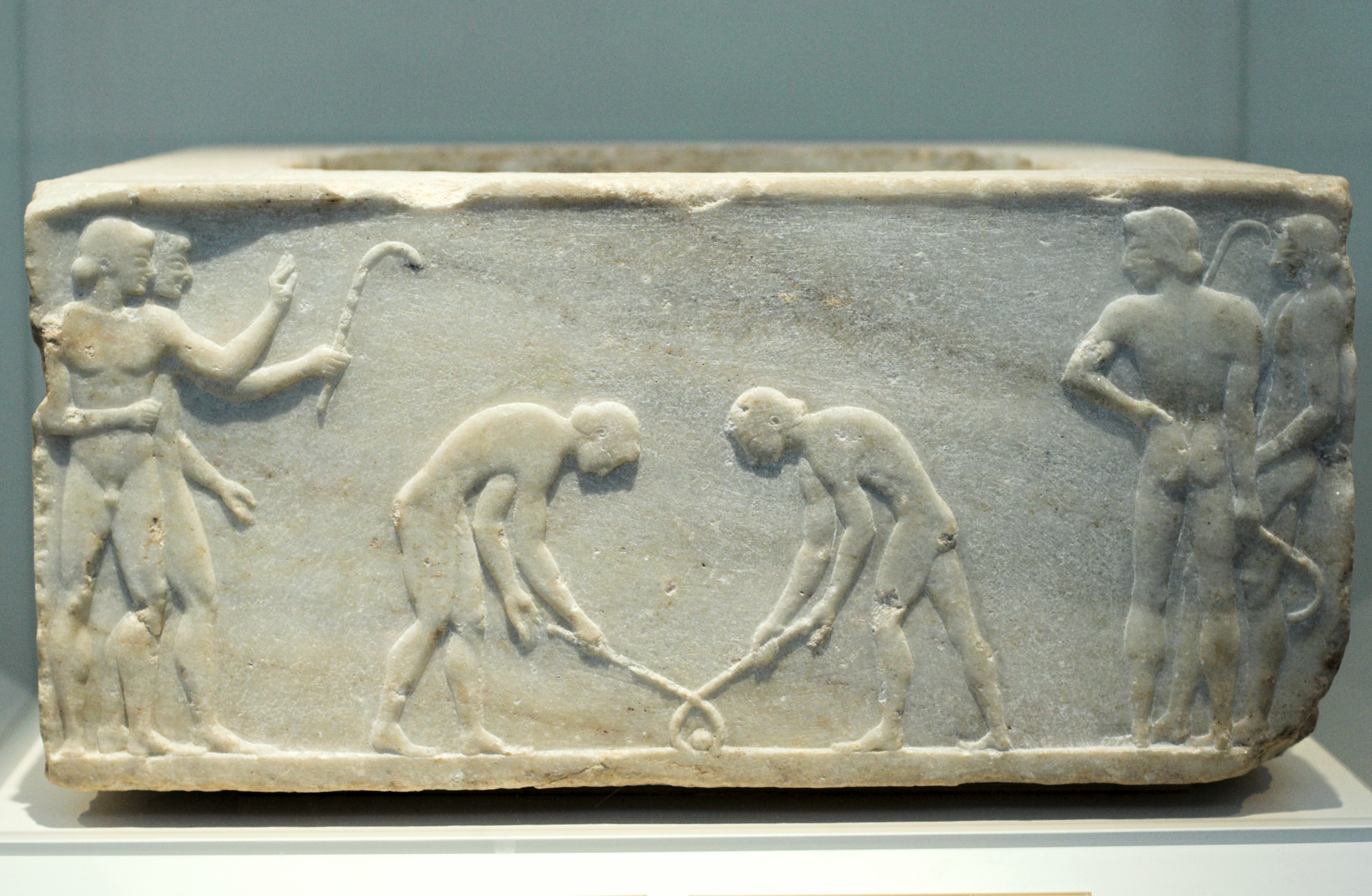
Relief of c. 510 BC depicting ancient Greek players of kerētízein, an ancestral form of hockey or ground billiards; in the National Archaeological Museum, Athens

According to the International Hockey Federation (FIH), "the roots of hockey are buried deep in antiquity". There are historical records which suggest early forms of hockey were played in Egypt and Persia c. 2000 BC, and in Ethiopia c. 1000 BC. Later evidence suggest that the ancient Greeks, Romans and Aztecs all played hockey-like games. In Ancient Egypt, there is a depiction of two figures playing with sticks and ball in the Beni Hasan tomb of Khety, an administrator of Dynasty XI.

In Ancient Greece, there is a similar image dated c. 510 BC, which may have been called Κερητίζειν (kerētízein) because it was played with a horn (κέρας, kéras in Ancient Greek) and a ball. Researchers disagree over how to interpret this image. It could have been a team or one-on-one activity (the depiction shows two active players, and other figures who may be team-mates awaiting a face-off, or non-players waiting for their turn at play). Billiards historians Stein and Rubino believe it was among the games ancestral to lawn-and-field games like hockey and ground billiards, and near-identical depictions appear in later European illuminated manuscripts and other works of the 14th through 17th centuries, showing contemporary courtly and clerical life.

In East Asia, a similar game was entertained, using a carved wooden stick and ball, before 300 BC. In Inner Mongolia, China, the Daur people have for about 1,000 years been playing beikou, a game with some similarities to field hockey. A similar field hockey or ground billiards variant, called suigan, was played in China during the Ming dynasty (1368–1644, post-dating the Mongol-led Yuan dynasty). A game similar to field hockey was played in the 17th century in the Punjab region of modern India and Pakistan, called khido khundi (khido refers to a woolen ball, and khundi to a stick). In South America, most specifically in Chile, the local natives of the 16th century used to play a game called chueca, which also shares common elements with hockey.

In Northern Europe, the games of hurling (Ireland) and knattleikr (Iceland), both team ball games involving sticks to drive a ball to the opponents' goal, date at least as far back as the Early Middle Ages. By the 12th century, a team ball game called la soule or choule, akin to a chaotic and sometimes long-distance version of hockey or rugby football (depending on whether sticks were used in a particular local variant), was regularly played in France and southern Britain between villages or parishes. Throughout the Middle Ages to the Early Modern era, such games often involved the local clergy or secular aristocracy, and in some periods were limited to them by various anti-gaming edicts, or even banned altogether. Stein and Rubino, among others, ultimately trace aspects of these games both to rituals in antiquity involving orbs and sceptres (on the aristocratic and clerical side), and to ancient military training exercises (on the popular side); polo (essentially hockey on horseback) was devised by the Ancient Persians for cavalry training, based on the local proto-hockey foot game of the region.

The word hockey itself has no clear origin. One belief is that it was recorded in 1363 when Edward III of England issued the proclamation: "Moreover we ordain that you prohibit under penalty of imprisonment all and sundry from such stone, wood and iron throwing; handball, football, or hockey; coursing and cock-fighting, or other such idle games". The belief is based on modern translations of the proclamation, which was originally in Latin and explicitly forbade the games "Pilam Manualem, Pedivam, & Bacularem: & ad Canibucam & Gallorum Pugnam". The word baculum is the Latin for 'stick', so the reference would appear to be to a game played with sticks. The English historian and biographer John Strype did not use the word hockey when he translated the proclamation in 1720, and the word hockey remains of unknown origin.

The modern game developed at public schools in 19th-century England. It is now played globally, particularly in parts of Western Europe, South Asia, Southern Africa, Australia, New Zealand, Argentina, and parts of the United States, primarily New England and the mid-Atlantic states. The term field hockey is used primarily in Canada and the United States where hockey more often refers to ice hockey. In Sweden, the term landhockey is used, and to some degree in Norway, where the game is governed by Norges Bandyforbund.

The first known club was formed in 1849 at Blackheath in south-east London, but the modern rules grew out of a version played by Middlesex cricket clubs as a winter activity. Teddington Hockey Club formed the modern game by introducing the striking circle and changing the ball to a sphere from a rubber cube. The Hockey Association was founded in 1876. It lasted just six years, before being revived by nine founding members. The first international competition took place in 1895 (Ireland 3, Wales 0), and the International Rules Board was founded in 1900.

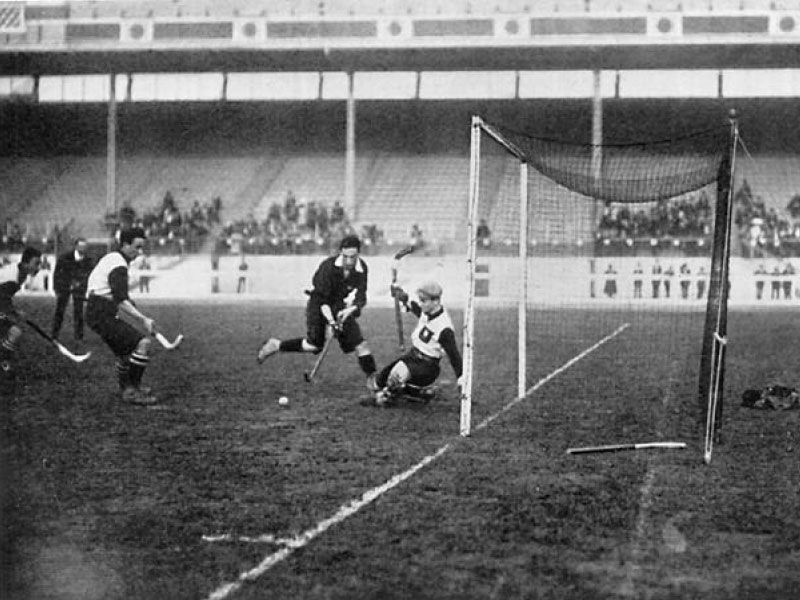
A game of hockey being played between Germany and Scotland at the 1908 London Olympics

Field hockey was played at the Summer Olympics in 1908 and 1920. It was dropped in 1924, leading to the foundation of the Fédération Internationale de Hockey sur Gazon (FIH) as an international governing body by seven continental European nations; and hockey was reinstated as an Olympic game in 1928. Men's hockey united under the FIH in 1970.

The two oldest trophies are the Irish Senior Cup, which dates back to 1894, and the Irish Junior Cup, a second XI-only competition instituted in 1895.

In India, the Beighton Cup and the Aga Khan tournament commenced within ten years. Entering the Olympics in 1928, India won all five games without conceding a goal, and won from 1932 until 1956, and then in 1964 and 1980. Pakistan won Olympic gold in men's hockey in 1960, 1968, and 1984. All but three of Pakistan's 11 Olympic medals so far have been in field hockey, including three gold, three silver, and two bronze medals.

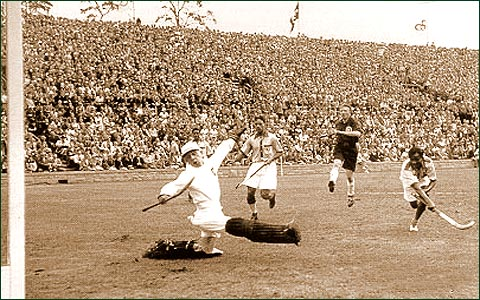
Indian player Dhyan Chand won Olympic gold medals for his team in 1928, 1932 and 1936. Photo shows him scoring a goal against Germany in the 1936 Olympics hockey final.

In the early 1970s, artificial turf began to be used. Synthetic pitches changed most aspects of field hockey, gaining speed. New tactics and techniques such as the Indian dribble developed, followed by new rules to take account. The switch to synthetic surfaces ended Indian and Pakistani domination because artificial turf was too expensive in developing countries.

Women's field hockey was first played at British universities and schools. The first club, the Molesey Ladies, was founded in 1887. The first national association was the Irish Ladies Hockey Union in 1894, and though rebuffed by the Hockey Association, women's field hockey grew rapidly around the world. This led to the International Federation of Women's Hockey Association (IFWHA) in 1927, though this did not include many continental European countries where women played as sections of men's associations and were affiliated to the FIH. The IFWHA held conferences every three years, and tournaments associated with these were the primary IFWHA competitions. These tournaments were non-competitive until 1975.

By the early 1970s, there were 22 associations with women's sections in the FIH and 36 associations in the IFWHA. Discussions started about a common rule book. The FIH introduced competitive tournaments in 1974, forcing the acceptance of the principle of competitive field hockey by the IFWHA in 1973. It took until 1982 for the two bodies to merge, but this allowed the introduction of women's field hockey to the Olympic games from 1980 where, as in the men's game, the Netherlands, Germany, and Australia have been consistently strong. Argentina has emerged as a team to be reckoned with since 2000, winning the world championship in 2002 and 2010 and medals at the last three Olympics.

In the United States, field hockey is played predominantly by girls and women. There are few field hockey clubs, most play taking place between high school or college sides. The sport was largely introduced in the U.S. by Constance Applebee, starting with a tour of Seven Sisters colleges in 1901 and continuing through Applebee's 24-year tenure as athletic director of Bryn Mawr College. The strength of college field hockey reflects the impact of Title IX, which mandated that colleges should fund men's and women's games programmes comparably. Hockey has been predominantly played on the East Coast, specifically the Mid-Atlantic in states such as New Jersey, New York, Pennsylvania, Maryland, and Virginia. In recent years, it has become increasingly played on the West Coast and in the Midwest.

In other countries, participation is fairly evenly balanced between men and women. For example, in the 2008–09 season, England Hockey reported 2,488 registered men's teams, 1,969 women's teams, 1,042 boys' teams, 966 girls' teams and 274 mixed teams. In 2006, the Irish Hockey Association reported that the gender split among its players was approximately 65% female and 35% male. In its 2008 census, Hockey Australia reported 40,534 male club players and 41,542 female.

== Field of play ==
Diagram of a hockey field

Most hockey field dimensions were originally fixed using whole numbers of imperial measures. Metric measurements are now the official dimensions as laid down by the International Hockey Federation (FIH) in the Rules of Hockey.

The pitch is a 91.4 m × 55 m (100.0 yd × 60.1 yd) rectangular field. At each end is a goal 2.14 m (7 ft) high and 3.66 m (12 ft) wide, as well as lines across the field 22.90 m (25 yd) from each end-line (generally referred to as the 23-metre lines or the 25-yard lines) and in the center of the field. A spot 0.15 m (6 in) in diameter, called the penalty spot or stroke mark, is placed with its centre 6.40 m (7 yd) from the centre of each goal. The shooting circle, most commonly known as 'the D' due to its shape, is 15 m (16 yd) from the base line.

Field hockey goals are made of two upright posts, joined at the top by a horizontal crossbar, with a net positioned to catch the ball when it passes through the goalposts. The goalposts and crossbar must be white and rectangular in shape, and should be 2 in (51 mm) wide and 2–3 in (51–76 mm) deep. Field hockey goals also include sideboards and a backboard, which stand 50 cm (20 in) from the ground. The backboard runs the full 3.66 m (12.0 ft) width of the goal, while the sideboards are 1.2 m (3 ft 11 in) deep.

=== Playing surface ===
Historically the game developed on natural grass turf. In the early 1970s, synthetic grass fields began to be used for hockey, with the first Olympic Games on this surface being held at Montreal in 1976. Synthetic pitches are now mandatory for all international tournaments and for most national competitions. While hockey is still played on traditional grass fields at some local levels and lesser national divisions, it has been replaced by synthetic surfaces almost everywhere in the western world. There are three main types of artificial hockey surface:

- Unfilled or water based – artificial fibres that are densely packed for stabilisation, requires irrigation or watering to avoid pitch wear
- Dressed or sand dressed – artificial fibres can be less densely packed and sand supports the fibres for part of the pile depth
- Filled or sand filled – artificial fibres can be longer and less densely packed and sand supports the fibres for 100% of the pile depth

Since the 1970s, sand-based pitches have been favoured as they dramatically speed up the game. However, in recent years there has been a massive increase in the number of "water-based" artificial turfs. Water-based synthetic turfs enable the ball to be transferred more quickly than on sand-based surfaces. It is this characteristic that has made them the surface of choice for international and national league competitions. Water-based surfaces are also less abrasive than sand-based surfaces and reduce the level of injury to players when they come into contact with the surface. Following the 2018 FIH Congress it was decided that new surfaces being laid should be of a hybrid variety which require less watering. This is due to the negative ecological effects of the high water requirements of water-based synthetic fields. It has also been stated that the decision to make artificial surfaces mandatory greatly favoured more affluent countries who could afford these new pitches.

== Rules and play ==
=== Overview ===
The game is played between two teams of eleven; 10 field players and one goal keeper are permitted to be on the pitch at any one time. The remaining players may be substituted in any combination. There is an unlimited number of times a team can sub in and out. Substitutions are permitted at any point in the game, apart from between the award and end of a penalty corner; two exceptions to this rule is for injury or suspension of the defending goalkeeper, which is not allowed when playing with a field keep, or a player can exit the field, but you must wait until after the penalty corner is complete. Play is not stopped for a substitution (except of a goalkeeper), the players leave and rejoin the match simultaneously at the half-way line.

Players are permitted to play the ball with the flat of the 'face side' and with the edges of the head and handle of the field hockey stick with the exception that, for reasons of safety, the ball may not be struck 'hard' with a forehand edge stroke, because of the difficulty of controlling the height and direction of the ball from that stroke.

The flat side is always on the "natural" side for a right-handed person swinging the stick at the ball from right to left. Left-handed sticks are rare, as International Hockey Federation rules forbid their use in a game. To make a strike at the ball with a left-to-right swing the player must present the flat of the 'face' of the stick to the ball by 'reversing' the stick head, i.e. by turning the handle through approximately 180° (while a reverse edge hit would turn the stick head through approximately 90° from the position of an upright forehand stroke with the 'face' of the stick head).

Edge hitting of the ball underwent a two-year "experimental period", twice the usual length of an "experimental trial" and is still a matter of some controversy within the game. Ric Charlesworth, the former Australian coach, has been a strong critic of the unrestricted use of the reverse edge hit. The 'hard' forehand edge hit was banned after similar concerns were expressed about the ability of players to direct the ball accurately, but the reverse edge hit does appear to be more predictable and controllable than its counterpart. This type of hit is now more commonly referred to as the "forehand sweep" where the ball is hit with the flat side or "natural" side of the stick and not the rounded edge.

Other rules include; no foot-to-ball contact, no use of hands, no obstructing other players, no high back swing, no hacking, and no third party. If a player is dribbling the ball and either loses control and kicks the ball or another player interferes that player is not permitted to gain control and continue dribbling. The rules do not allow the person who kicked the ball to gain advantage from the kick, so the ball will automatically be passed on to the opposing team. Conversely, if no advantage is gained from kicking the ball, play should continue. Players may not obstruct another's chance of hitting the ball in any way. No shoving/using your body/stick to prevent advancement in the other team. Penalty for this is the opposing team receives the ball and if the problem continues, the player can be carded. While a player is taking a free hit or starting a corner the back swing of their hit cannot be too high for this is considered dangerous. Finally there may not be three players touching the ball at one time. Two players from opposing teams can battle for the ball, however if another player interferes it is considered third party and the ball automatically goes to the team who only had one player involved in the third party.

=== The game ===
A match ordinarily consists of two periods of 35 minutes and a halftime interval of 5 minutes. Other periods and interval may be agreed by both teams except as specified in regulations for particular competitions. Since 2014, some international games have four 15-minute quarters with 2 minutes break between each quarter and 5 minutes break between quarter two and three. At the 2018 Commonwealth Games, held on the Gold Coast in Brisbane, the hockey games for both men and women were played in four 15-minute quarters.

In December 2018, the FIH announced rule changes that would make 15-minute quarters universal from January 2019. England Hockey confirmed that while no changes would be made to the domestic game mid-season, the new rules would be implemented at the start of the 2019–20 season. However, in July 2019 England Hockey announced that 17.5-minute quarters would only be implemented in elite domestic club games.

The game begins with a pass back from the centre-forward usually to the centre-half back from the halfway line. The opposing team cannot try to tackle this play until the ball has been pushed back. The team consists of eleven players, usually aligned as follows: goalkeeper, right fullback, left fullback, three half-backs and five forwards who are right wing, right inner, centre forward, left inner and left wing. These positions can change and adapt throughout the course of the game depending on the attacking and defensive style of the opposition.

=== Positions ===
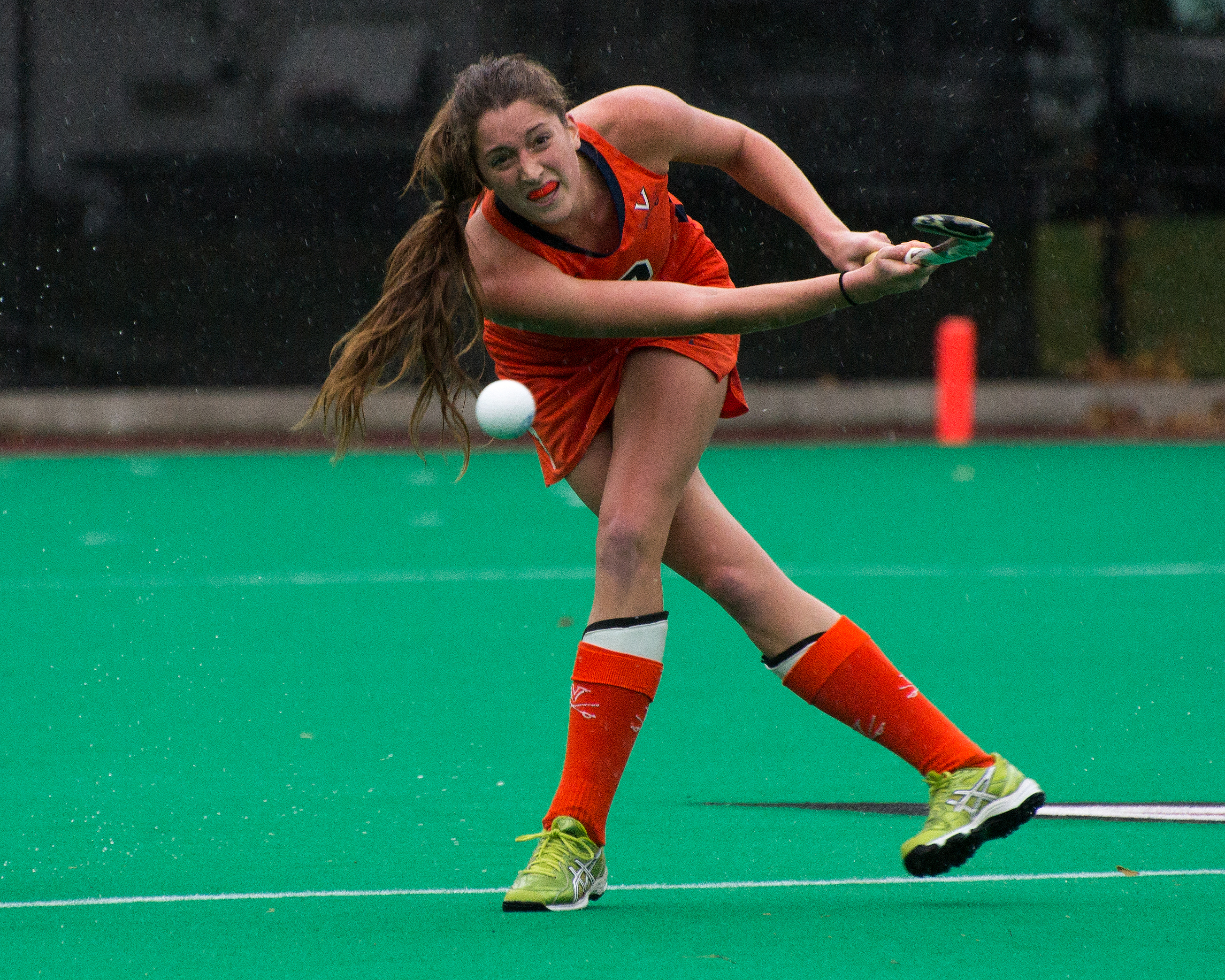
A Virginia Cavaliers field player passing the ball

When hockey positions are discussed, notions of fluidity are very common. Each team can be fielded with a maximum of 11 players and will typically arrange themselves into forwards, midfielders, and defenders with players frequently moving between these lines with the flow of play. Each team may also play with:

- a goalkeeper who wears a different colour shirt and full protective equipment comprising at least headgear, leg guards and kickers; this player is referred to in the rules as a goalkeeper; or
- Only field players; no player has goalkeeping privileges or wears a different colour shirt; no player may wear protective headgear except a face mask when defending a penalty corner or stroke.

==== Formations ====
As hockey has a very dynamic style of play, it is difficult to simplify positions to the static formations which are common in association football. Although positions will typically be categorised as either fullback, halfback, midfield/inner or striker, it is important for players to have an understanding of every position on the field. For example, it is not uncommon to see a halfback overlap and end up in either attacking position, with the midfield and strikers being responsible for re-adjusting to fill the space they left. Movement between lines like this is particularly common across all positions.

This fluid approach to hockey has been responsible for developing an international trend towards players occupying spaces on the field, not having assigned positions. Although they may have particular spaces on the field which they are more comfortable and effective as players, they are responsible for occupying the space nearest them. This player movement has made it easy for teams to transition between formations such as: "3 at the back", "5 midfields", "2 at the front", and more.

==== Goalkeepers ====
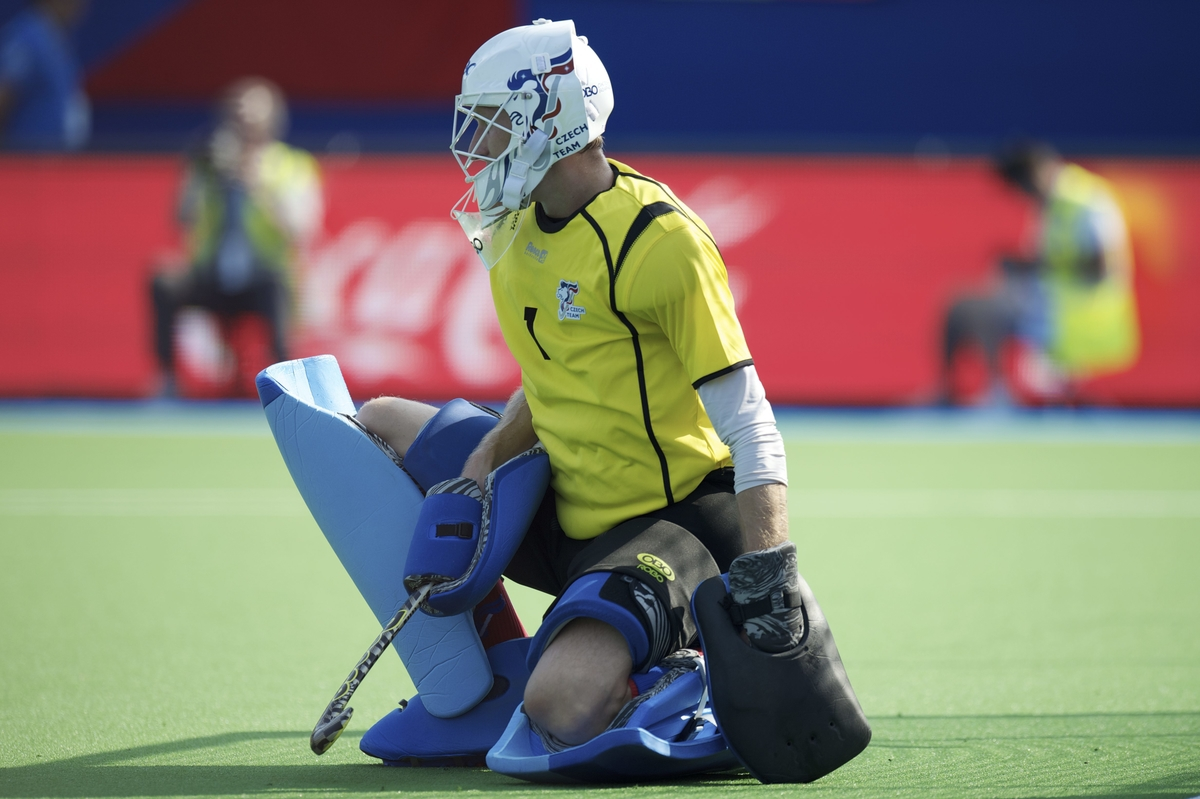
Goalkeeper Filip Neusser in full gear

When the ball is inside the circle, they are defending and they have their stick in their hand, goalkeepers wearing full protective equipment are permitted to use their stick, feet, kickers or leg guards to propel the ball and to use their stick, feet, kickers, leg guards or any other part of their body to stop the ball or deflect it in any direction including over the back line. Similarly, field players are permitted to use their stick. They are not allowed to use their feet and legs to propel the ball, stop the ball or deflect it in any direction including over the back line. However, neither goalkeepers, or players with goalkeeping privileges are permitted to conduct themselves in a manner which is dangerous to other players by taking advantage of the protective equipment they wear.

Neither goalkeepers or players with goalkeeping privileges may lie on the ball, however, they are permitted to use arms, hands and any other part of their body to push the ball away. Lying on the ball deliberately will result in a penalty stroke, whereas if an umpire deems a goalkeeper has lain on the ball accidentally (e.g. it gets stuck in their protective equipment), a penalty corner is awarded.

* The action above is permitted only as part of a goal saving action or to move the ball away from the possibility of a goal scoring action by opponents. It does not permit a goalkeeper or player with goalkeeping privileges to propel the ball forcefully with arms, hands or body so that it travels a long distance

When the ball is outside the circle they are defending, goalkeepers or players with goalkeeping privileges are only permitted to play the ball with their stick. Further, a goalkeeper, or player with goalkeeping privileges who is wearing a helmet, must not take part in the match outside the 23m area they are defending, except when taking a penalty stroke. A goalkeeper must wear protective headgear at all times, except when taking a penalty stroke.

=== General play ===
For the purposes of the rules, all players on the team in possession of the ball are attackers, and those on the team without the ball are defenders, yet throughout the game being played you are always "defending" your goal and "attacking" the opposite goal.

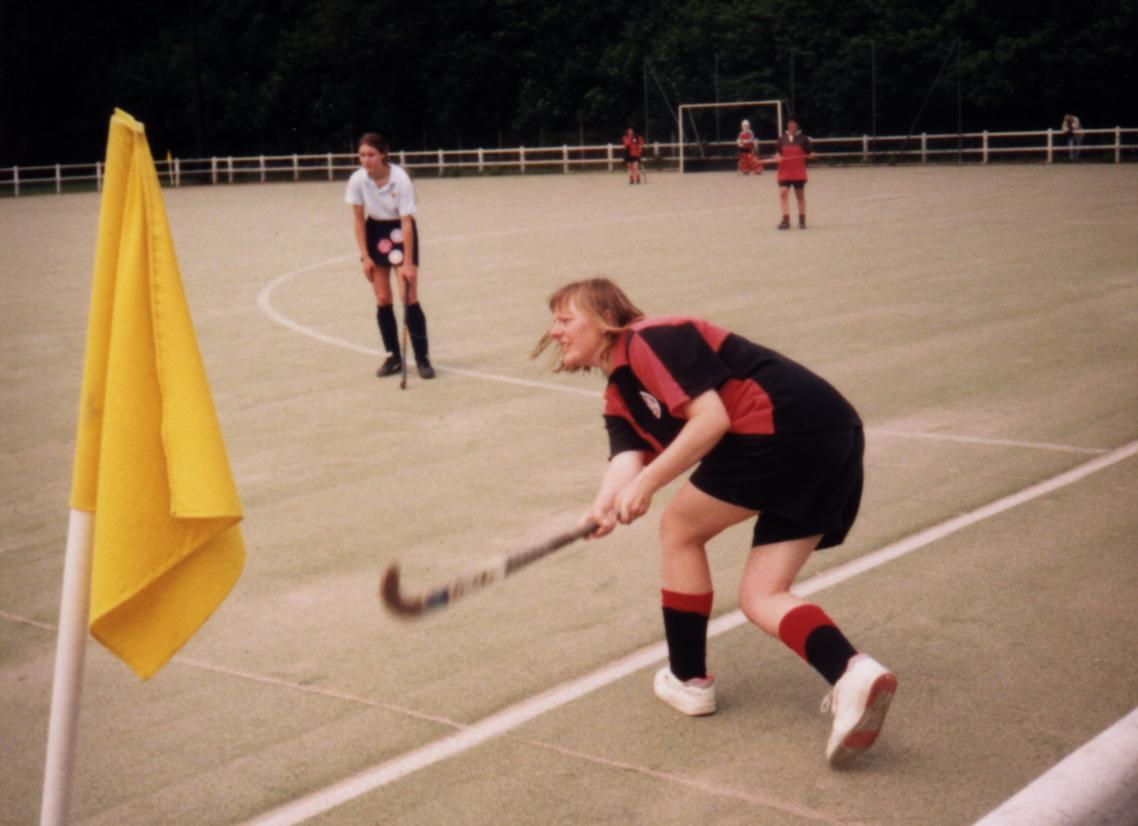
Sideline hit in a match Standard Athletic Club vs. British School of Paris (1996)

The match is officiated by two field umpires. Each umpire generally controls the half of the field and the shooting circle to their right, divided roughly diagonally, but they will often defer to the other's judgement when uncertainties arise. These umpires are often assisted by a technical bench including a timekeeper and record keeper at international and high level domestic games.

Prior to the start of the game, a coin is tossed and the winning captain can choose a starting end or whether to start with the ball. Since 2017 the game consists of four periods of 15 minutes with a 2-minute break after every period, and a 15-minute intermission at half time before changing ends. At the start of each period, as well as after goals are scored, play is started with a pass from the centre of the field. All players must start in their defensive half (apart from the player making the pass), but the ball may be played in any direction along the floor. Each team starts with the ball in one half, and the team that conceded the goal has possession for the restart. Teams trade sides at halftime.

Field players may only play the ball with the face of the stick. If the back side of the stick is used, it is a penalty and the other team will get the ball back. Tackling is permitted as long as the tackler does not make contact with the attacker or the other person's stick before playing the ball (contact after the tackle may also be penalised if the tackle was made from a position where contact was inevitable). Further, the player with the ball may not deliberately use his body to push a defender out of the way.

Field players may not play the ball with their feet, but if the ball accidentally hits the feet, and the player gains no benefit from the contact, then the contact is not penalised. Although there has been a change in the wording of this rule from 1 January 2007, the current FIH umpires' briefing instructs umpires not to change the way they interpret this rule.

Obstruction typically occurs in three circumstances – when a defender comes between the player with possession and the ball in order to prevent them tackling; when a defender's stick comes between the attacker's stick and the ball or makes contact with the attacker's stick or body; and also when blocking the opposition's attempt to tackle a teammate with the ball (called third party obstruction).

When the ball passes completely over the sidelines (on the sideline is still in), it is returned to play with a sideline hit, taken by a member of the team whose players were not the last to touch the ball before crossing the sideline. The ball must be placed on the sideline, with the hit taken from as near the place the ball went out of play as possible. If it crosses the back line after last touched by an attacker, a 15 m (16 yd) hit is awarded. A 15 m hit is also awarded for offences committed by the attacking side within 15 m of the end of the pitch they are attacking.

=== Set plays ===
Set plays are often utilised for specific situations such as a penalty corner or free hit. For instance, many teams have penalty corner variations that they can use to beat the defensive team. The coach may have plays that sends the ball between two defenders and lets the player attack the opposing team's goal. There are no set plays unless your team has them.

==== Free hits ====
Free hits are awarded when offences are committed outside the scoring circles (the term 'free hit' is standard usage but the ball need not be hit). The ball may be hit, pushed or lifted in any direction by the team offended against. The ball can be lifted from a free hit but not by hitting, the ball must be flicked or scooped to lift from a free hit. (In previous versions of the rules, hits in the area outside the circle in open play have been permitted but lifting one direction from a free hit was prohibited). Opponents must move 5 m (5.5 yd) from the ball when a free hit is awarded. A free hit must be taken from within playing distance of the place of the offence for which it was awarded and the ball must be stationary when the free hit is taken.

As mentioned above, a 15 m hit is awarded if an attacking player commits a foul forward of that line, or if the ball passes over the back line off an attacker. These free hits are taken in-line with where the foul was committed (taking a line parallel with the sideline between where the offence was committed, or the ball went out of play). When an attacking free hit is awarded within 5 m of the circle everyone including the person taking the penalty must be five meters from the circle and everyone apart from the person taking the free hit must be five meters away from the ball. When taking an attacking free hit, the ball may not be hit straight into the circle if the hitting player is within their attacking 23-meter area (25-yard area). It has to travel 5 meters before going in.

==== 2009 experimental changes ====
In February 2009 the FIH introduced, as a "Mandatory Experiment" for international competition, an updated version of the free-hit rule. The changes allows a player taking a free hit to pass the ball to themselves. Importantly, this is not a "play on" situation, but to the untrained eye it may appear to be. The player must play the ball any distance in two separate motions, before continuing as if it were a play-on situation. They may raise an aerial or overhead immediately as the second action, or any other stroke permitted by the rules of field hockey. At high-school level, this is called a self pass and was adopted in Pennsylvania in 2010 as a legal technique for putting the ball in play.

Also, all players (from both teams) must be at least 5 m from any free hit awarded to the attack within the 23 m area. The ball may not travel directly into the circle from a free hit to the attack within the 23 m area without first being touched by another player or being dribbled at least 5 m by a player making a "self-pass". These experimental rules apply to all free-hit situations, including sideline and corner hits. National associations may also choose to introduce these rules for their domestic competitions.

==== Long corner ====
A free hit from the 23-metre line – called a long corner – is awarded to the attacking team if the ball goes over the back-line after last being touched by a defender, provided they do not play it over the back-line deliberately, in which case a penalty corner is awarded. This free hit is played by the attacking team from a spot on the 23-metre line, in line with where the ball went out of play. All the parameters of an attacking free hit within the attacking quarter of the playing surface apply.

==== Penalty corner ====
The short or penalty corner is awarded:

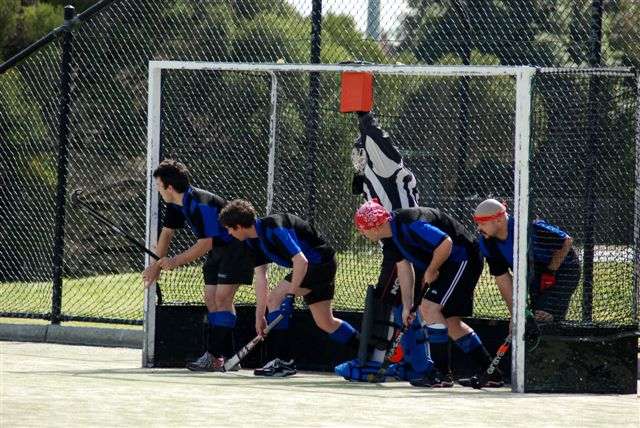
A group of five defenders, including the goalkeeper, prepare on the back line for a short corner.

1. for an offence by a defender in the circle which does not prevent the probable scoring of a goal;
2. for an intentional offence in the circle by a defender against an opponent who does not have possession of the ball or an opportunity to play the ball;
3. for an intentional offence by a defender outside the circle but within the 23-metre area they are defending;
4. for intentionally playing the ball over the back line by a defender;
5. when the ball becomes lodged in a player's clothing or equipment while in the circle they are defending.

Short corners begin with five defenders (usually including the keeper) positioned behind the back line and the ball placed at least 10 yards from the nearest goal post. All other players in the defending team must be beyond the centre line, that is not in their 'own' half of the pitch, until the ball is in play. Attacking players begin the play standing outside the scoring circle, except for one attacker who starts the corner by playing the ball from a mark 10 m either side of the goal (the circle has a 14.63 m radius). This player puts the ball into play by pushing or hitting the ball to the other attackers outside the circle; the ball must pass outside the circle and then put back into the circle before the attackers may make a shot at the goal from which a goal can be scored. FIH rules do not forbid a shot at goal before the ball leaves the circle after being 'inserted', nor is a shot at the goal from outside the circle prohibited, but a goal cannot be scored at all if the ball has not gone out of the circle and cannot be scored from a shot from outside the circle if it is not again played by an attacking player before it enters the goal.

For safety reasons, the first shot of a penalty corner must not exceed 460 mm high (the height of the "backboard" of the goal) at the point it crosses the goal line if it is hit. However, if the ball is deemed to be below backboard height, the ball can be subsequently deflected above this height by another player (defender or attacker), providing that this deflection does not lead to danger. The "Slap" stroke (a sweeping motion towards the ball, where the stick is kept on or close to the ground when striking the ball) is classed as a hit, and so the first shot at goal must be below backboard height for this type of shot also.

If the first shot at goal in a short corner situation is a push, flick or scoop, in particular the drag flick (which has become popular at international and national league standards), the shot is permitted to rise above the height of the backboard, as long as the shot is not deemed dangerous to any opponent. This form of shooting was developed because it is not height restricted in the same way as the first hit shot at the goal and players with good technique are able to drag-flick with as much power as many others can hit a ball.

==== Penalty stroke ====
A penalty stroke is awarded when a defender commits a foul in the circle (accidental or otherwise) that prevents a probable goal or commits a deliberate foul in the circle or if defenders repeatedly run from the back line too early at a penalty corner. The penalty stroke is taken by a single attacker in the circle, against the goalkeeper, from a spot 6.4 m from goal. The ball is played only once at goal by the attacker using a push, flick or scoop stroke. If the shot is saved, play is restarted with a 15 m hit to the defenders. When a goal is scored, play is restarted in the normal way.

=== Dangerous play and raised balls ===
According to the Rules of Hockey 2015 issued by the FIH there are only two criteria for a dangerously played ball. The first is legitimate evasive action by an opponent (what constitutes legitimate evasive action is an umpiring judgment). The second is specific to the rule concerning a shot at goal at a penalty corner but is generally, if somewhat inconsistently, applied throughout the game and in all parts of the pitch: it is that a ball lifted above knee height and at an opponent who is within 5m of the ball is certainly dangerous.

The velocity of the ball is not mentioned in the rules concerning a dangerously played ball. A ball that hits a player above the knee may on some occasions not be penalised, this is at the umpire's discretion. A jab tackle, for example, might accidentally lift the ball above knee height into an opponent from close range but at such low velocity as not to be, in the opinion of the umpire, dangerous play. In the same way a high-velocity hit at very close range into an opponent, but below knee height, could be considered to be dangerous or reckless play in the view of the umpire, especially when safer alternatives are open to the striker of the ball.

A ball that has been lifted high so that it will fall among close opponents may be deemed to be potentially dangerous and play may be stopped for that reason. A lifted ball that is falling to a player in clear space may be made potentially dangerous by the actions of an opponent closing to within 5m of the receiver before the ball has been controlled to ground – a rule which is often only loosely applied; the distance allowed is often only what might be described as playing distance, 2–3 m, and opponents tend to be permitted to close on the ball as soon as the receiver plays it: these unofficial variations are often based on the umpire's perception of the skill of the players i.e. on the level of the game, in order to maintain game flow, which umpires are in general in both Rules and Briefing instructed to do, by not penalising when it is unnecessary to do so; this is also a matter at the umpire's discretion.

The term "falling ball" is important in what may be termed encroaching offences. It is generally only considered an offence to encroach on an opponent receiving a lifted ball that has been lifted to above head height (although the height is not specified in rule) and is falling. So, for example, a lifted shot at the goal which is still rising as it crosses the goal line (or would have been rising as it crossed the goal line) can be legitimately followed up by any of the attacking team looking for a rebound.

In general even potentially dangerous play is not penalised if an opponent is not disadvantaged by it or, obviously, not injured by it so that he cannot continue. A personal penalty, that is a caution or a suspension, rather than a team penalty, such as a free ball or a penalty corner, may be (many would say should be or even must be, but again this is at the umpire's discretion) issued to the guilty party after an advantage allowed by the umpire has been played out in any situation where an offence has occurred, including dangerous play (but once advantage has been allowed the umpire cannot then call play back and award a team penalty).

It is not an offence to lift the ball over an opponent's stick (or body on the ground), provided that it is done with consideration for the safety of the opponent and not dangerously. For example, a skilful attacker may lift the ball over a defender's stick or prone body and run past them, however if the attacker lifts the ball into or at the defender's body, this would almost certainly be regarded as dangerous.

It is not against the rules to bounce the ball on the stick and even to run with it while doing so, as long as that does not lead to a potentially dangerous conflict with an opponent who is attempting to make a tackle. For example, two players trying to play at the ball in the air at the same time, would probably be considered a dangerous situation and it is likely that the player who first put the ball up or who was so 'carrying' it would be penalised.

Dangerous play rules also apply to the usage of the stick when approaching the ball, making a stroke at it (replacing what was at one time referred to as the "sticks" rule, which once forbade the raising of any part of the stick above the shoulder during any play. This last restriction has been removed but the stick should still not be used in a way that endangers an opponent) or attempting to tackle, (fouls relating to tripping, impeding and obstruction). The use of the stick to strike an opponent will usually be much more severely dealt with by the umpires than offences such as barging, impeding and obstruction with the body, although these are also dealt with firmly, especially when these fouls are intentional.

=== Warnings and suspensions ===
Hockey uses a three-tier penalty card system of warnings and suspensions:

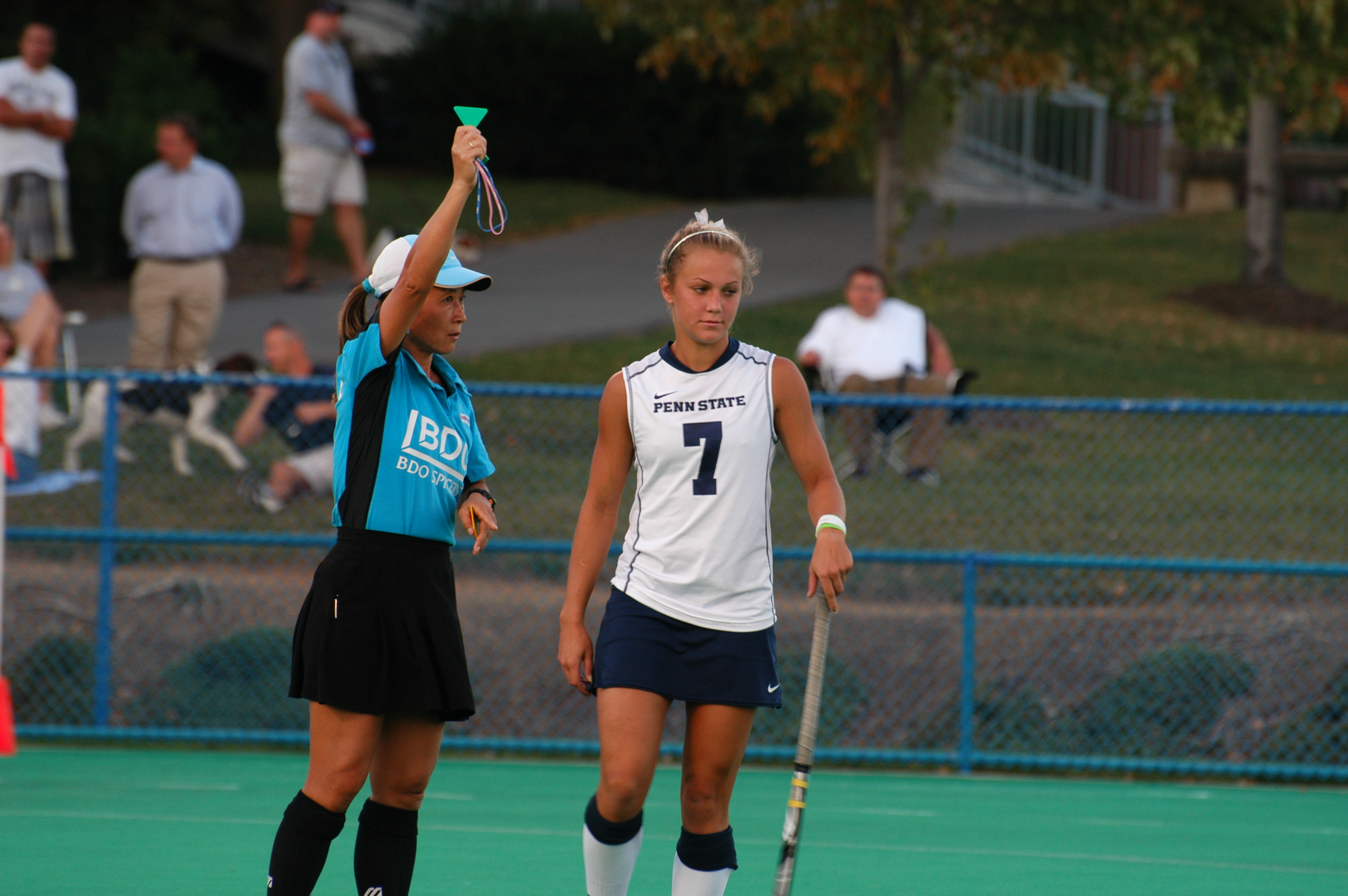
A Penn State player receives a green card.

- When shown a green card, the player may have to leave the field for two minutes, depending on national regulations, though at international standards the player has to leave the field for two minutes, but any further infractions will result in a yellow or red card.
- A yellow card is an official suspension similar to the penalty box in ice hockey. The duration is decided by the umpire issuing the card and the player must go to a pre-defined area of the pitch as chosen by the umpires, or by the local/state/national association of that country; in this case generally it will be in the rule book where that player must go to, at the beginning of the match. Most umpires will opt for a minimum of five minutes' duration without substitution; the maximum time is at the discretion of the umpire, depending on the seriousness of the offence; for example the second yellow to the same player or the first for danger might be given ten minutes. (In some modes, including indoor, shorter periods of suspension are applied, dependent on local rules.) However it is possible to send a player off for the remainder of the match if the penalty time is longer than the time remaining in the match. Three yellows risks a red card, and a substitute will serve out whatever time imposed by the officials. Depending on national rules, if a coach is sent off a player may have to leave the field too for the time the coach is sent off.
- A red card, just like in association football, is a permanent exclusion from the rest of the game, without substitution, and usually results in the player being banned for a certain period of time or number of matches (this is governed by local playing conditions, rather than the rules of field hockey). The player must also leave the pitch and surrounding area.

If a coach is sent off, depending on local rules, a player may have to leave the field for the remaining length of the match.

In addition to their colours, field hockey penalty cards are often shaped differently, so they can be recognised easily. Green cards are normally triangular, yellow cards rectangular and red cards circular.

Unlike football, a player may receive more than one green or yellow card. However, they cannot receive the same card for the same offence (for example two yellows for dangerous play), and the second must always be a more serious card. In the case of a second yellow card for a different breach of the rules (for example a yellow for deliberate foot, and a second later in the game for dangerous play) the temporary suspension would be expected to be of considerably longer duration than the first. However, local playing conditions may mandate that cards are awarded only progressively, and not allow any second awards.

Umpires, if the free hit would have been in the attacking 23 m area, may upgrade the free hit to a penalty corner for dissent or other misconduct after the free hit has been awarded.

=== Scoring ===
The teams' object is to play the ball into their attacking circle and, from there, hit, push or flick the ball into the goal, scoring a goal. The team with more goals after 60 minutes wins the game. The playing time may be shortened, particularly when younger players are involved, or for some tournament play. If the game is played in a countdown clock, like ice hockey, a goal can only count if the ball completely crosses the goal line and into the goal before time expires, not when the ball leaves the stick in the act of shooting.

If the score is tied at the end of the game, either a draw is declared or the game goes into extra time, or there is a penalty shoot-out, depending on the format of the competition. In many competitions (such as regular club competition, or in pool games in FIH international tournaments such as the Olympics or the World Cup), a tied result stands and the overall competition standings are adjusted accordingly. Since March 2013, when tie breaking is required, the official FIH Tournament Regulations mandate to no longer have extra time and go directly into a penalty shoot-out when a classification match ends in a tie. However, many associations follow the previous procedure consisting of two periods of 7.5 minutes of "golden goal" extra time during which the game ends as soon as one team scores.

There are many variations to overtime play that depend on the league or tournament rules. In American college play, a seven-a-side overtime period consists of a 10-minute golden goal period with seven players for each team. If the scores remain equal, the game enters a one-on-one competition where each team chooses five players to dribble from the 25-yard (23 m) line down to the circle against the opposing goalkeeper. The player has eight seconds to score against the goalkeeper while keeping the ball in bounds. The game ends after a goal is scored, the ball goes out of bounds, a foul is committed (ending in either a penalty stroke or flick or the end of the one-on-one) or time expires. If the tie still persists, more rounds are played until one team has scored.

=== Rule change procedure ===
The FIH implemented a two-year rules cycle with the 2007–08 edition of the rules, with the intention that the rules be reviewed on a biennial basis. The 2009 rulebook was officially released in early March 2009 (effective 1 May 2009), however the FIH published the major changes in February. The current rule book is effective from 1 January 2024.

== Local rules ==
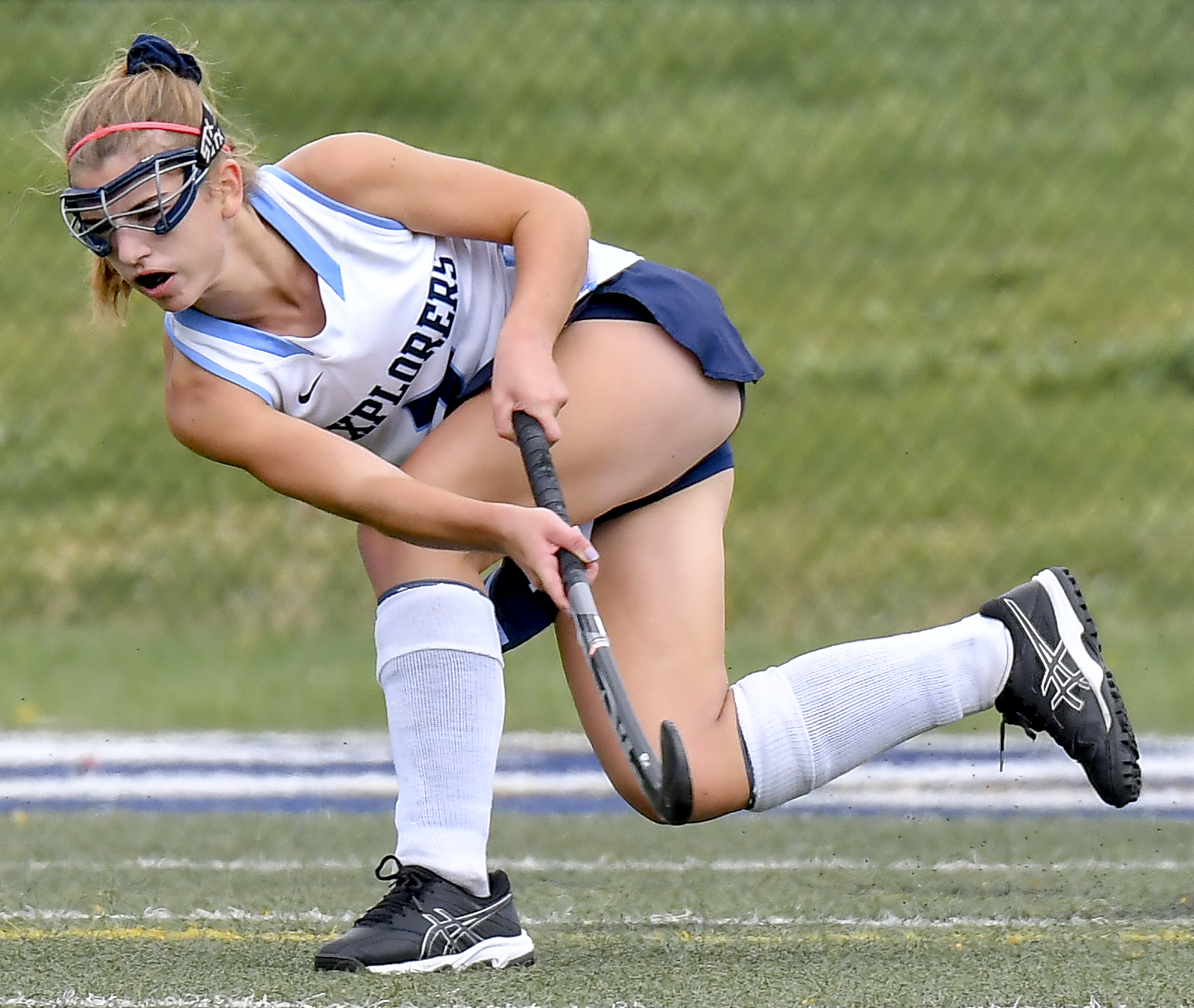
An American high school field hockey player wearing goggles and a mouthguard

There are sometimes minor variations in rules from competition to competition; for instance, the duration of matches is often varied for junior competitions or for carnivals. Different national associations also have slightly differing rules on player equipment.

The new Euro Hockey League and the Olympics has made major alterations to the rules to aid television viewers, such as splitting the game into four-quarters, and to try to improve player behavior, such as a two-minute suspension for green cards—the latter was also used in the 2010 World Cup and 2016 Olympics. In the United States, the NCAA has its own rules for inter-collegiate competitions; high school associations similarly play to different rules, usually using the rules published by the National Federation of State High School Associations (NFHS). This article assumes FIH rules unless otherwise stated. USA Field Hockey produces an annual summary of the differences.

In the United States, the games at the junior high level consist of four 12-minute periods, while the high-school level consists of four 15-minute periods. Many private American schools play 12-minute quarters, and some have adopted FIH rules rather than NFHS rules.

Players are required to wear mouth guards and shin guards in order to play the game. Also, there is a newer rule requiring certain types of sticks be used. In recent years, the NFHS rules have moved closer to FIH, but in 2011 a new rule requiring protective eyewear was introduced for the 2011 Fall season. Further clarification of NFHS's rule requiring protective eyewear states, "effective 1 January 2019, all eye protection shall be permanently labeled with the current ASTM 2713 standard for field hockey". Metal 'cage style' goggles favored by US high school lacrosse and permitted in high school field hockey is prohibited under FIH rules.

== Equipment ==
=== Field hockey stick ===
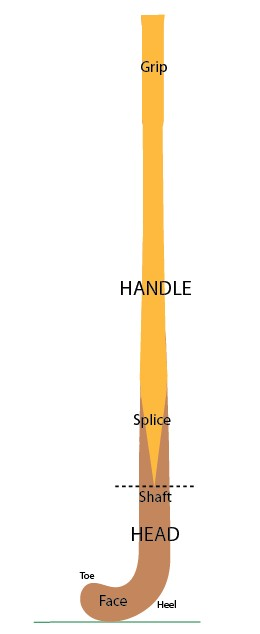
Naming parts of stick

Each player carries a hockey stick that normally measures between 80 and 95 cm (31 and 37 in); shorter or longer sticks are available. The length of the stick is based on the player's individual height: the top of the stick usually comes to the player's hip, and taller players typically have longer sticks. Goalkeepers can use either a specialised stick, or an ordinary field hockey stick. The specific goal-keeping sticks have another curve at the end of the stick, to give it more surface area to block the ball.

Sticks were traditionally made of wood, but are now often made also with fibreglass, kevlar or carbon fibre composites. Metal is forbidden from use in field hockey sticks, due to the risk of injury from sharp edges if the stick were to break. The stick has a rounded handle, has a J-shaped hook at the bottom, and is flattened on the left side (when looking down the handle with the hook facing upwards). All sticks must be right-handed; left-handed ones are prohibited.

There was traditionally a slight curve (called the bow, or rake) from the top to bottom of the face side of the stick and another on the 'heel' edge to the top of the handle (usually made according to the angle at which the handle part was inserted into the splice of the head part of the stick), which assisted in the positioning of the stick head in relation to the ball and made striking the ball easier and more accurate.

There are different types of hooks like (Indian style) that we have nowadays. The older 'English' sticks had a longer bend, making it very hard to use the stick on the reverse. For this reason players now use the tight curved sticks.

The handle makes up about the top third of the stick. It is wrapped in a grip similar to that used on tennis racket. The grip may be made of a variety of materials, including chamois leather, which improves grip in the wet and gives the stick a softer touch and different weighting it wrapped over a preexisting grip.

It was recently discovered that increasing the depth of the face bow made it easier to get high speeds from the dragflick and made the stroke easier to execute. At first, after this feature was introduced, the Hockey Rules Board placed a limit of 50 mm on the maximum depth of bow over the length of the stick but experience quickly demonstrated this to be excessive. New rules now limit this curve to under 25 mm so as to limit the power with which the ball can be flicked.

Players are required to wear shin guards and mouth guards during play. Players also typically wear turf shoes, tennis shoes or cleats. Protective gloves can also be worn to protect the hands but are not required.

=== Field hockey ball ===
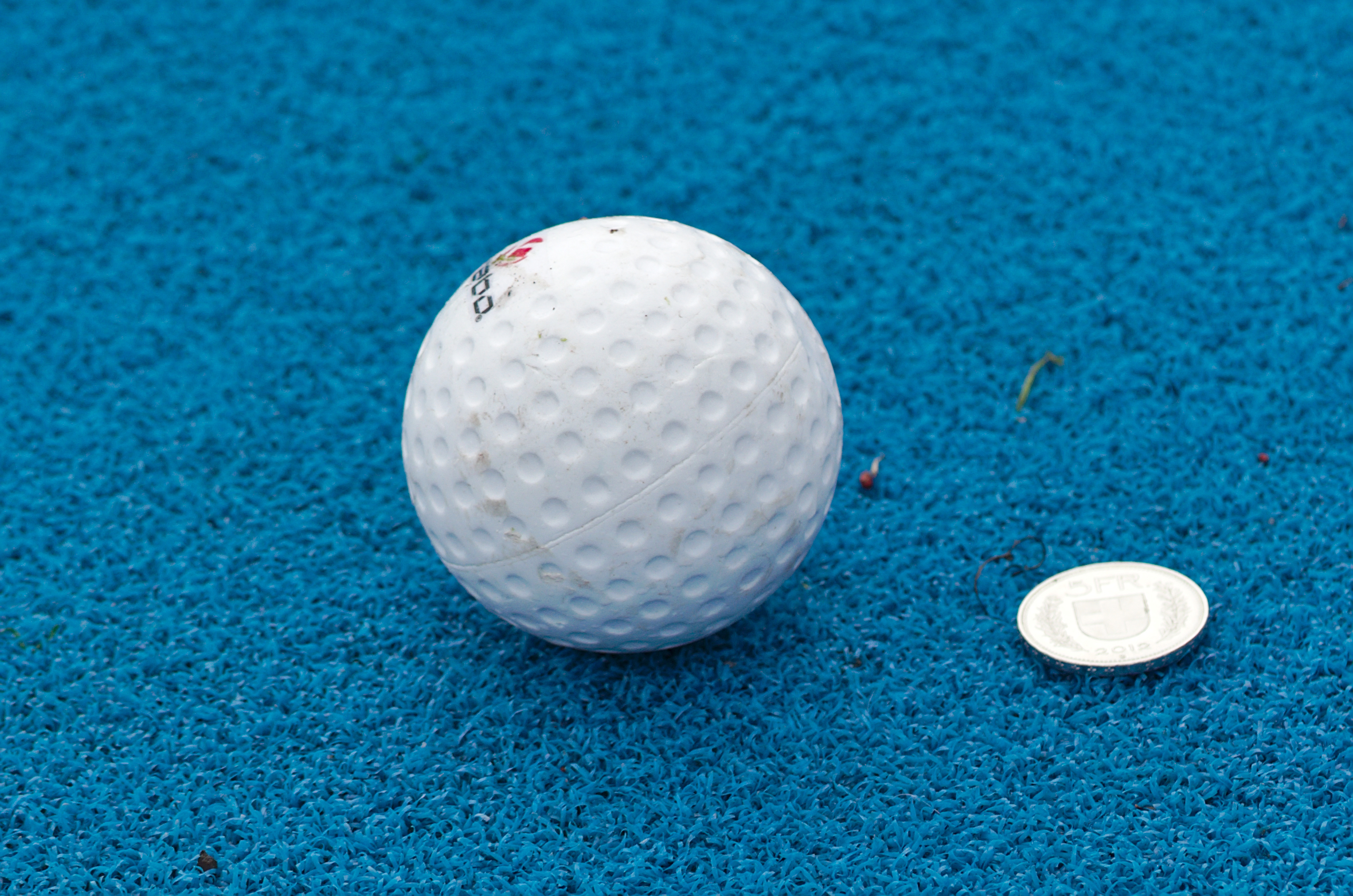
A field hockey ball with a 5 franc coin

Standard field hockey balls are hard spherical balls, made of solid plastic (sometimes over a cork core), and are usually white, although they can be any colour as long as they contrast with the playing surface. The balls have a diameter of 71.3–74.8 mm (2.81–2.94 in) and a mass of 156–163 g (5.5–5.7 oz). The ball is often covered with indentations to reduce aquaplaning that can cause an inconsistent ball speed on wet surfaces.

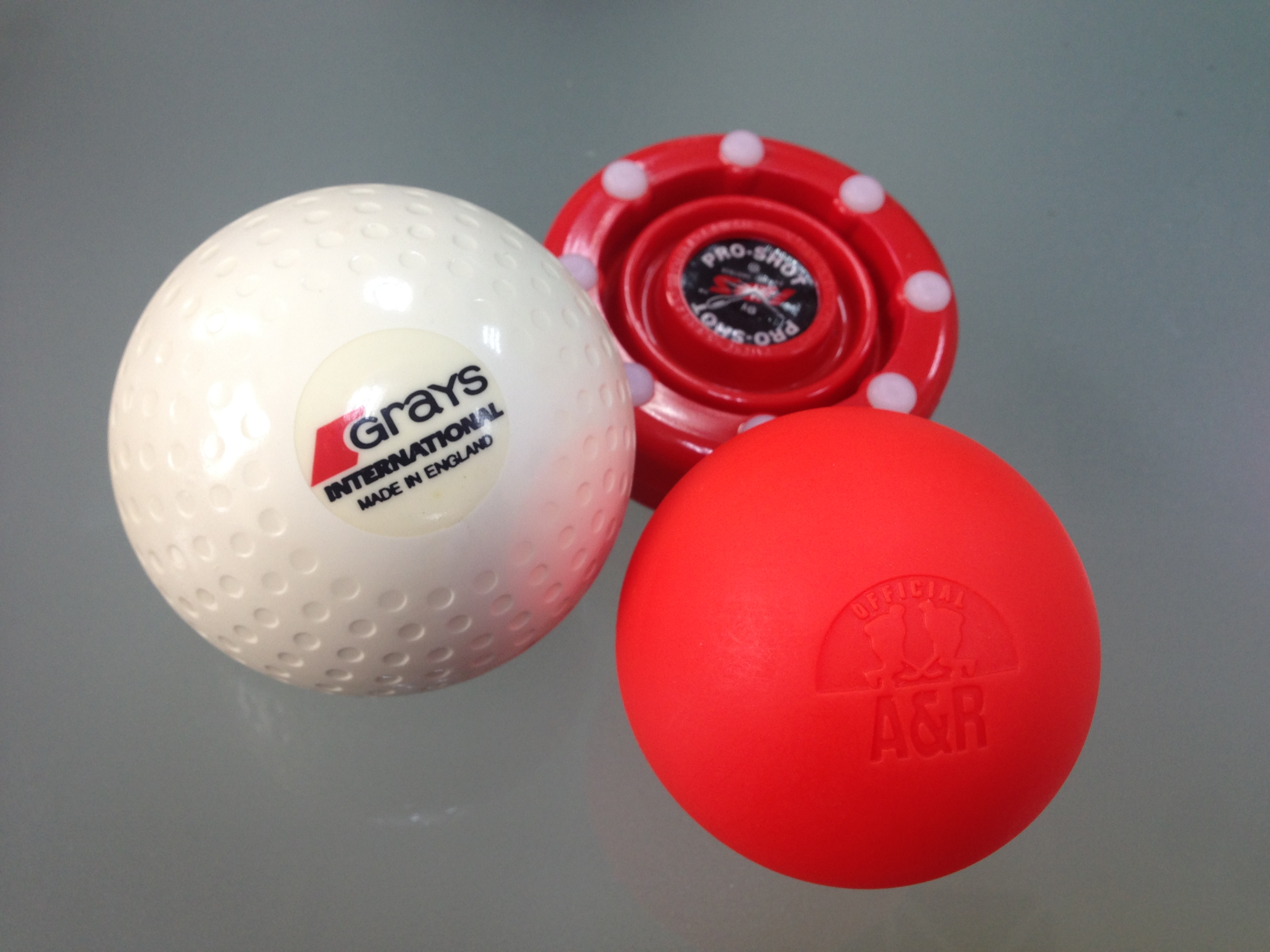
An assembly of field hockey balls and a roller hockey puck

=== Uniforms ===
International Hockey Federation rules for women are written so players may choose between shorts, skorts, or skirts if they have the same design and color across the team. A previous requirement was for women to wear skirts during play.

=== Goalkeeping equipment ===
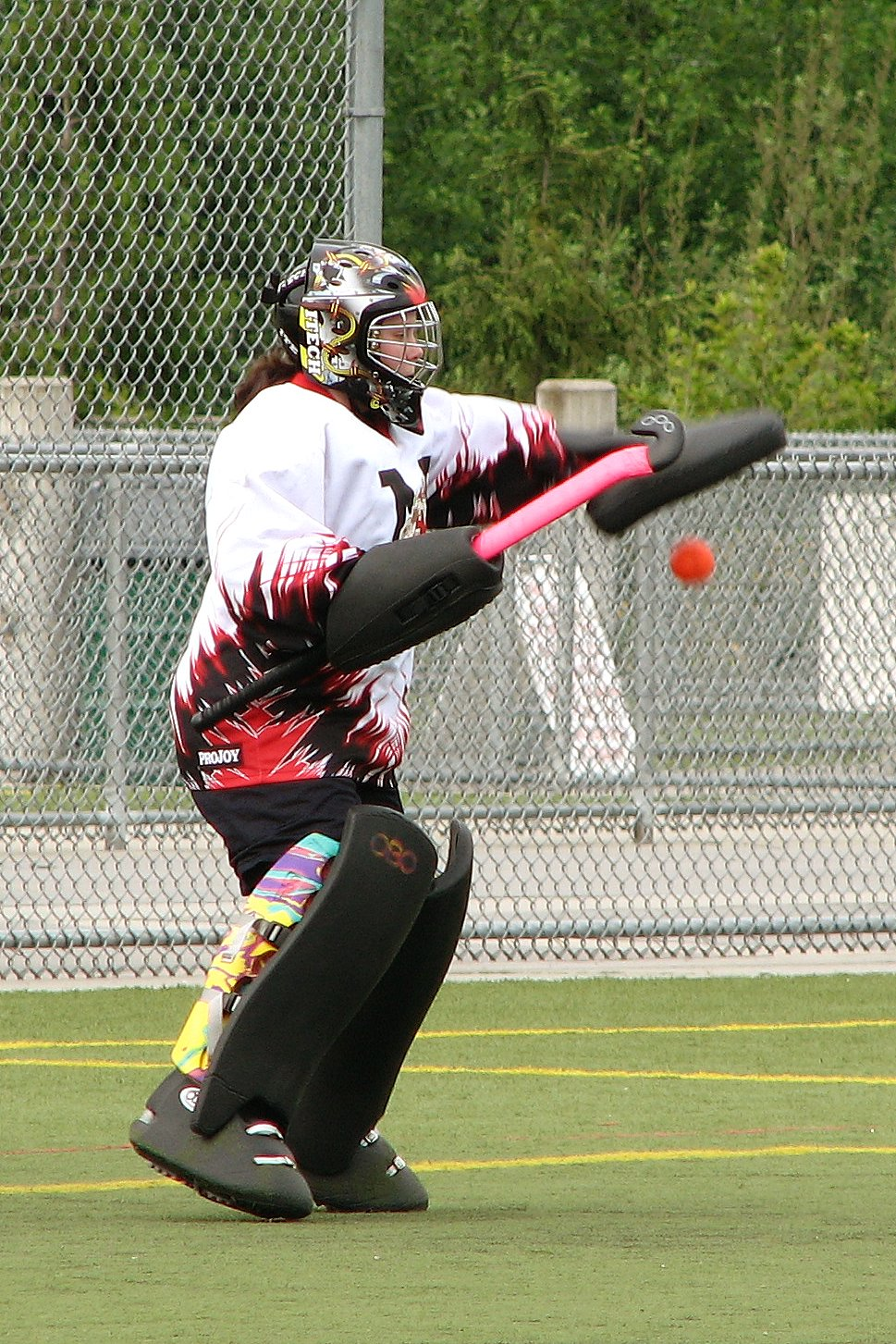
A goalkeeper makes a glove save. Equipment worn here is typical gear for a field hockey goalkeeper.

The 2007 rulebook saw major changes regarding goalkeepers. A fully equipped goalkeeper must wear a helmet, leg guards and kickers, and like all players, they must carry a stick. Goalkeepers may use either a field player's stick or a specialised goalkeeping stick provided always the stick is of legal dimensions. Usually field hockey goalkeepers also wear extensive additional protective equipment including chest guards, padded shorts, heavily padded hand protectors, groin protectors, neck protectors and arm guards. A goalie may not cross the 23 m line, the sole exception to this being if the goalkeeper is to take a penalty stroke at the other end of the field, when the clock is stopped. The goalkeeper can also remove their helmet for this action. While goalkeepers are allowed to use their feet and hands to clear the ball, like field players they may only use the one side of their stick. Slide tackling is permitted as long as it is with the intention of clearing the ball, not aimed at a player.

It is now also even possible for teams to have a full eleven outfield players and no goalkeeper at all. No player may wear a helmet or other goalkeeping equipment, neither will any player be able to play the ball with any other part of the body than with their stick. This may be used to offer a tactical advantage, for example, if a team is trailing with only a short time to play, or to allow for play to commence if no goalkeeper or kit is available.

== Tactics ==
The basic tactic in field hockey, as in association football and many other team games, is to outnumber the opponent in a particular area of the field at a moment in time. When in possession of the ball this temporary numerical superiority can be used to pass the ball around opponents so that they cannot effect a tackle because they cannot get within playing reach of the ball and to further use this numerical advantage to gain time and create clear space for making scoring shots on the opponent's goal. When not in possession of the ball numerical superiority is used to isolate and channel an opponent in possession and 'mark out' any passing options so that an interception or a tackle may be made to gain possession. Highly skillful players can sometimes get the better of more than one opponent and retain the ball and successfully pass or shoot but this tends to use more energy than quick early passing.

Every player has a role depending on their relationship to the ball if the team communicates throughout the play of the game. There will be players on the ball (offensively – ball carriers; defensively – pressure, support players, and movement players.

The main methods by which the ball is moved around the field by players are a) passing b) pushing the ball and running with it controlled to the front or right of the body and c) "dribbling"; where the player controls the ball with the stick and moves in various directions with it to elude opponents. To make a pass the ball may be propelled with a pushing stroke, where the player uses their wrists to push the stick head through the ball while the stick head is in contact with it; the "flick" or "scoop", similar to the push but with an additional arm and leg and rotational actions to lift the ball off the ground; and the "hit", where a swing at ball is taken and contact with it is often made very forcefully, causing the ball to be propelled at velocities in excess of 70 mph (110 km/h). In order to produce a powerful hit, usually for travel over long distances or shooting at the goal, the stick is raised higher and swung with maximum power at the ball, a stroke sometimes known as a "drive".

Tackles are made by placing the stick into the path of the ball or playing the stick head or shaft directly at the ball. To increase the effectiveness of the tackle, players will often place the entire stick close to the ground horizontally, thus representing a wider barrier. To avoid the tackle, the ball carrier will either pass the ball to a teammate using any of the push, flick, or hit strokes, or attempt to maneuver or "drag" the ball around the tackle, trying to deceive the tackler.

In recent years, the penalty corner has gained importance as a goal scoring opportunity. Particularly with the technical development of the drag flick. Tactics at penalty corners to set up time for a shot with a drag flick or a hit shot at the goal involve various complex plays, including multiple passes before deflections towards the goal is made but the most common method of shooting is the direct flick or hit at the goal.

At the highest level, field hockey is a fast moving, highly skilled game, with players using fast moves with the stick, quick accurate passing, and hard hits, in attempts to keep possession and move the ball towards the goal. Tackling with physical contact and otherwise physically obstructing players is not permitted. Some of the tactics used resemble football (soccer), but with greater ball speed.

With the 2009 changes to the rules regarding free hits in the attacking 23 m area, the common tactic of hitting the ball hard into the circle was forbidden. Although at higher levels this was considered tactically risky and low-percentage at creating scoring opportunities, it was used with some effect to 'win' penalty corners by forcing the ball onto a defender's foot or to deflect high (and dangerously) off a defender's stick. The FIH felt it was a dangerous practice that could easily lead to raised deflections and injuries in the circle, which is often crowded at a free-hit situation, and outlawed it.

== International competition ==
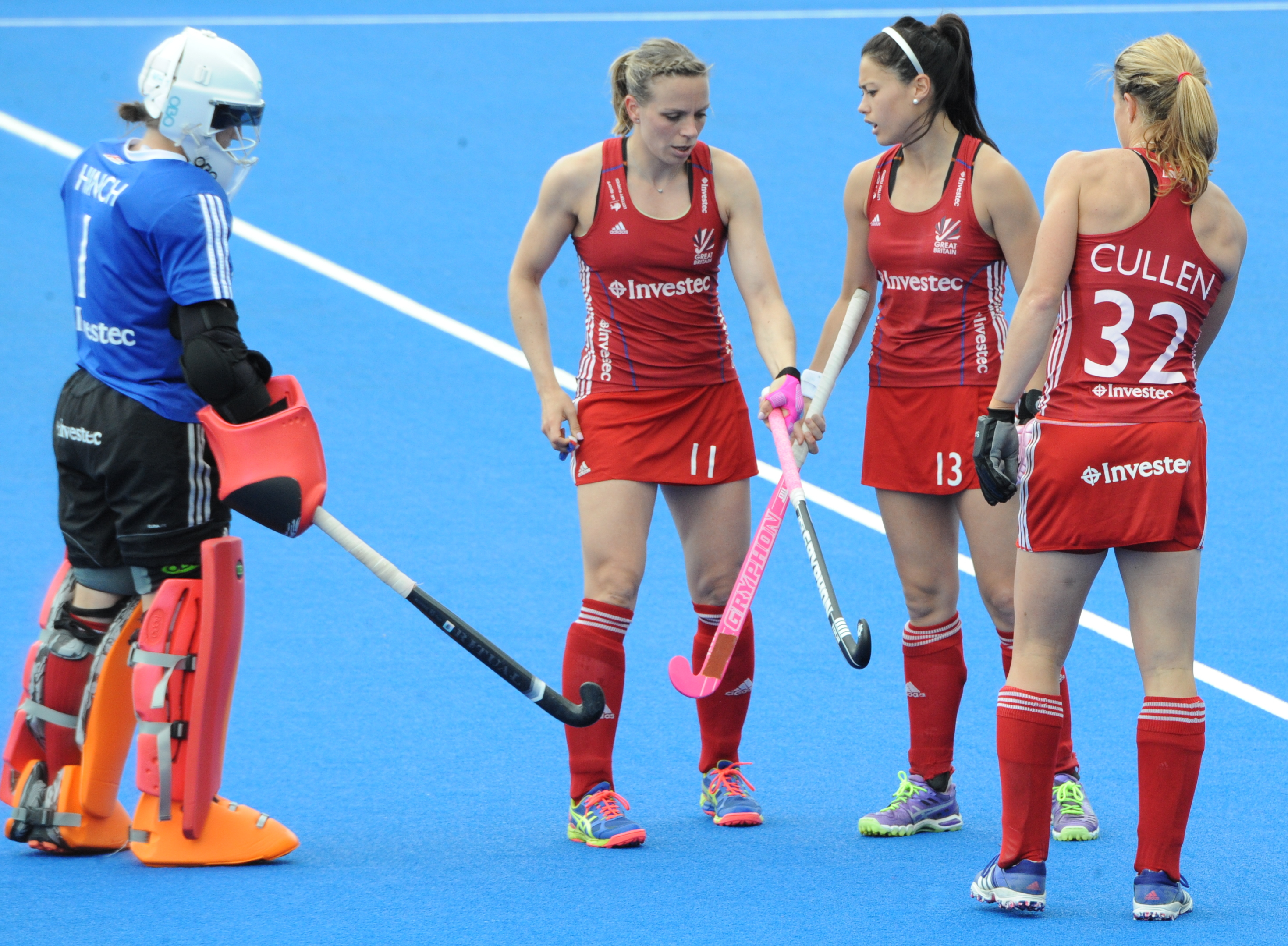
Great Britain's women's hockey players with their goal-keeper during a 2016 Champions Trophy match

The two most significant field hockey tournaments are the Olympic Games tournament and the Hockey World Cup, both of which are held every four years. Additionally, the men's and women's Pro League are held each year for the nine top-ranked teams.

Of the men's teams, Pakistan and Germany have won the Hockey World Cup four times, more times than any other side. India has won gold at the Summer Olympics eight times, including in six successive Olympiads. As for the female teams, the Netherlands has won the Hockey World Cup the most times, with six titles. At the Olympics, Australia and the Netherlands have both won three Olympic tournaments.

India and Pakistan dominated men's hockey until the early 1980s, winning eight Olympic golds and three of the first five world cups, respectively. Belgium, the Netherlands, Germany, New Zealand, Australia, and Spain have ascended since the late 1980s, as grass playing surfaces were replaced with artificial turf. Other notable men's nations include Argentina, England (who combine with other British "Home Nations" to form the Great Britain side at Olympic events) and South Korea.

The Netherlands, Australia and Argentina are the most successful national teams among women. The Netherlands was the predominant women's team before field hockey was added to Olympic events. In the early 1990s, Australia emerged as the strongest women's country, though retirement of a number of players has weakened the team somewhat. Argentina improved its play in the 2000s, heading IFH rankings in 2003, 2010 and 2013. Other prominent women's teams are Germany, Great Britain, China, South Korea and India. Four nations have won Olympic gold medals in both men's and women's hockey: Germany, Netherlands, Australia and Great Britain.

As of August 2025 the Dutch lead both men's and women's team FIH world rankings.

This is a list of the major international field hockey tournaments, in chronological order. Tournaments included are:

- Olympic Games (women's and men's versions) – held every four years.
- Women's FIH Hockey World Cup and Men's FIH Hockey World Cup – held every four years, in between the Olympics.
- Women's FIH Pro League and Men's FIH Pro League – held annually since 2019, but not in 2020 because of COVID-19.
- Women's FIH Hockey Nations Cup and Men's FIH Hockey Nations Cup – held since 2022

Defunct tournaments:

- Champions Trophy (women's and men's versions) – both replaced by the Pro Leagues.
- Champions Challenge (women's and men's versions) – both replaced by the World Hockey Leagues.
- Champions Challenge II (women's and men's versions) – both replaced by the World Hockey Leagues.
- Women's FIH Hockey World League and Men's FIH Hockey World League – both replaced by the Pro Leagues.

Other international tournaments include:

- African Games – held occasionally since 1987.
- Asian Games – held every four years since 1958.
- Commonwealth Games – held every four years since 1998 between members of the Commonwealth of Nations.
- Pacific Games – held occasionally since 1979.
- Pan American Games – held every four years since 1967.
- Sultan Azlan Shah Hockey Tournament – held annually in Malaysia, an invitational tournament.
- Sultan Ibrahim Ismail Hockey Tournament – held annually for athletes aged under-21 in Malaysia, an invitational tournament.

== Variants ==
=== Indoor hockey ===
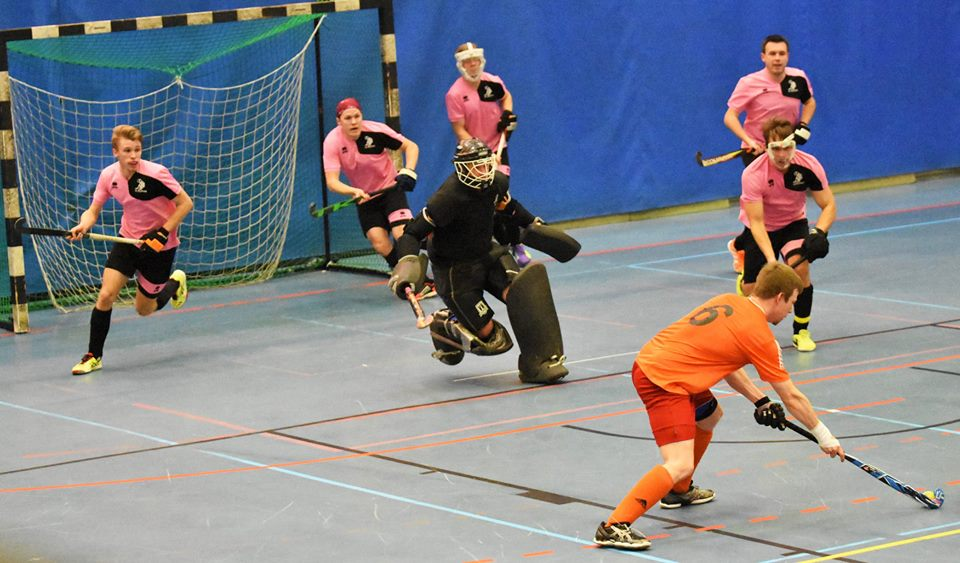
Indoor hockey match at Samppalinna Ball Game Hall in Turku, Finland, 2016

A popular variant of field hockey is indoor hockey, which is 6-a-side (5-a-side during 2014–2015) using a field which is reduced to approximately 40 m × 20 m (131 ft × 66 ft). Although many of the rules remain the same, including obstruction and feet, there are several key variations: players may not raise the ball unless shooting at goal, players may not hit the ball, instead using pushes to transfer it, and the sidelines are replaced with solid barriers, from which the ball will rebound and remain in play. In addition, the regulation guidelines for the indoor hockey stick require a slightly thinner, lighter stick than an outdoor one.

=== Hockey5s ===
Hockey5s
- Highest governing body: International Hockey Federation

Characteristics
- Contact: Yes
- Team members: 5 per side (30 Minutes in 2 period)
- Type: Hockey5s
- Equipment: hockey ball, hockey stick, mouthguard, gloves, shinpads

Presence
- Olympic: No (except the Youth Olympics since 2014)
- World Championships: 2024
- World Games: No

Hockey5s is a hockey variant which features five players on each team (including a goalkeeper). The field of play is 55 m long and 41.70 m wide—this is approximately half the size of a regular pitch. Few additional markings are needed as there is no penalty circle nor penalty corners; shots can be taken from anywhere on the pitch. Penalty strokes are replaced by a "challenge" which is like the one-on-one method used in a penalty shoot-out. The duration of the match is three 12-minute periods with an interval of two minutes between periods; golden goal periods are multiple 5-minute periods. The rules are simpler and it is intended that the game is faster, creating more shots on goal with less play in midfield, and more attractive to spectators.

An Asian qualification tournament for two places at the 2014 Youth Olympic Games was the first time an FIH event used the Hockey5s format. Hockey5s was also used for the Pacific Games in 2015 and at the African Youth Games in 2018. 2014 and 2018 Youth Olympics were held in this format.

In 2022, the FIH staged its first senior international Hockey5s event, with a men's and women's event being held in Lausanne. The FIH Men's Hockey5s World Cup and FIH Women's Hockey5s World Cup made debut in 2024. In 2026, inaugural Men's and Women's Youth World Championship for the under-18 category are set to be held.

=== Beach hockey ===
IHF created a beach version with larger ball to be played on sand.

== Sources ==
- Rules of Hockey (effective from 1 January 2022) (PDF). FIH. 2022.

== See also ==
- India–Pakistan field hockey rivalry
- India–Malaysia field hockey rivalry
- Netherlands–Pakistan field hockey record
