= Indian dribble =

Field hockey technique

The Indian dribble is a field hockey technique, first appearing at the 1956 Summer Olympics. The base of the technique is the continuous pushing of the ball from left to right and back in a rapid fashion. The movement of the ball is achieved by repeatedly turning the hockey stick from a legal left shot to a legal right shot position. Once mastered, it is a very good way to beat your opponent, as a player using Indian dribble is hard to defend against. It was named after the superb dribbling skills of the Indian and Pakistani teams.

== History ==
This dribble was introduced by the Indian and the Pakistani teams — at that point, two of the dominant hockey countries. This new technique was one of the key points that helped these countries lead the field hockey world at that time. Until the mid-1950s playing the ball on the right hand side was dominant but this changed following a tour by the German National team to Pakistan. In 1954 players studied the Pakistan methods for four weeks, analysing their individual skills at controlling the ball in front of the body. As a result, the “Indian Dribble“ and the shorter Asian blade of sticks were introduced to the German game. Due to the changed position of the ball, and with the help of new blades, players’ behaviour was less predictable; they had a greater variety of passing and deception options.

A new skill in 1950s, it is now a basic technique in field hockey.

In the 1980s astro-turf was introduced and hockey was one of its adopters. This resulted in a significant change in the way the game was played. Among the changes was an easier mastery of the Indian dribble techniques, resulting in its usage in many countries and at all levels of competitive hockey. Currently, the technique is used in many ways and situations during hockey matches.

== Skill ==
- The left hand rotates the stick while the right hand guides its movement.
- Bring the ball with the hook of the stick from the forehand to the backhand and, using the tip, back again.
- Make sure that the stick turns over the ball: across the front of the ball and not behind the ball.
- Keep the ball in front of the body.

== Sources ==
- History
- BBC Sport Academy Hockey Skills Master the Indian dribble
- A Hockey World "Field Hockey Skills: The Indian Dribbling, the most important skill?"
