= Penalty stroke =

Penalty in field hockey

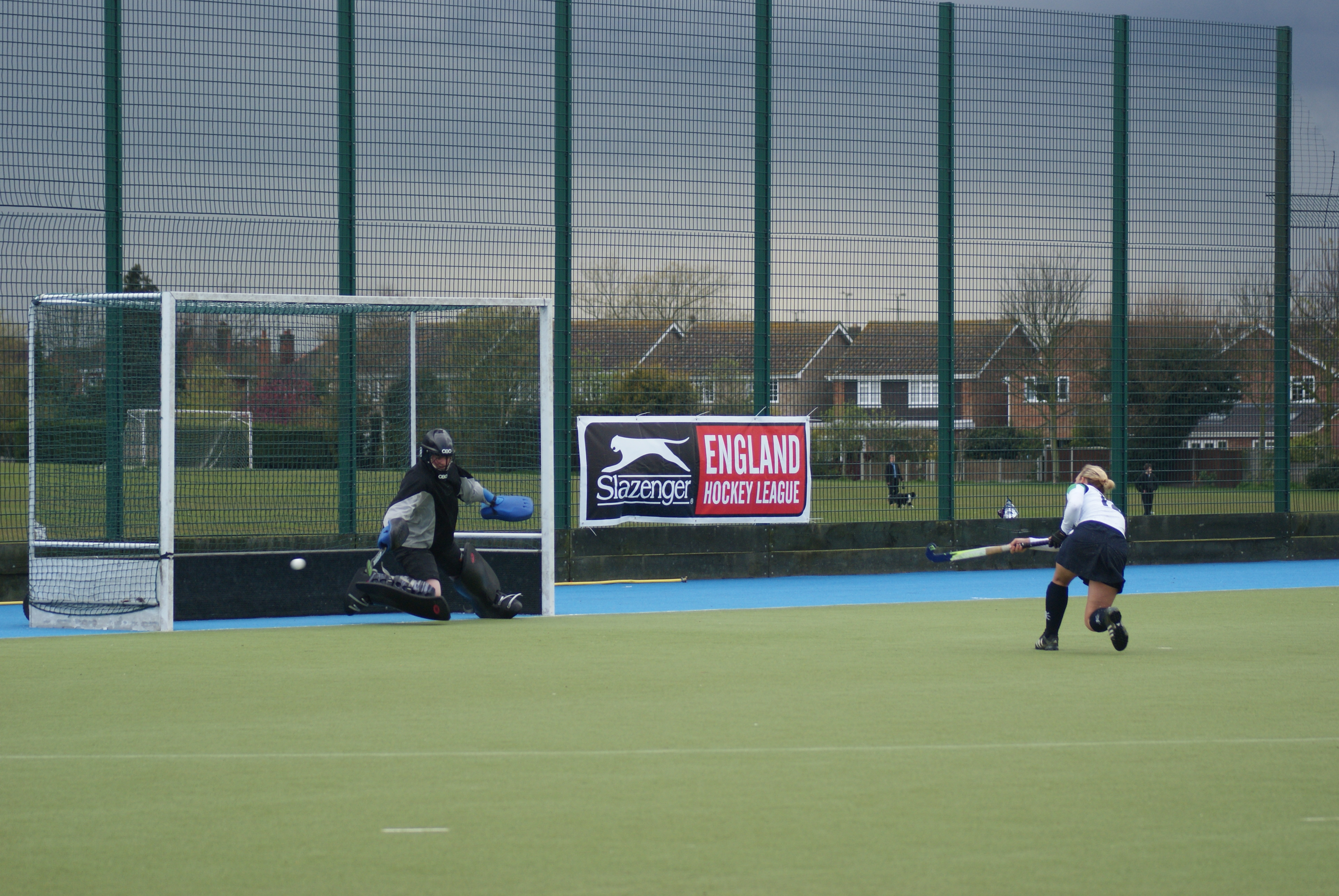
A penalty stroke consisting of a single stroke by an attacker against the goalkeeper from the penalty spot.

In field hockey, a penalty stroke, sometimes known as a penalty flick, is the most severe penalty given. It is predominantly awarded when a foul has prevented a certain goal from being scored or for a deliberate infringement by a defender in the penalty circle.

== Awarding a penalty stroke ==
There are two reasons why a penalty stroke may be awarded:

- For an intentional foul on an attacker who has possession of or opportunity to play the ball in the circle
- For a foul in the penalty circle that prevents "the probable scoring of a goal".

== Procedure ==
Upon the awarding of a penalty stroke, time in the match is stopped. The penalty stroke is between any chosen attacking player and the defensive goalkeeper. (Note: Defensive teams are permitted to play without a normal goalkeeper—either having a player with goalkeeping privileges, sometimes known as a "kicking back", or having no goalkeeper. A player with goalkeeping privileges wears protective headgear and can prevent a goal in the same way as a goalkeeper. If there is no goalkeeper, a chosen defensive player must wear a face-mask and is only permitted to prevent a goal with their stick.) The penalty stroke is taken from the penalty spot which is 6.4 metres (7.0 yd) directly in front of the centre of the goal. Before the penalty stroke is taken, the goalkeeper must be standing with both feet on the goal line and the attacker within playing distance of the ball. When the umpire blows the whistle, the attacker may play the ball at goal using a "push, flick or scoop" motion. (Note: The "dragging" motion, or drag-flick, often seen at a penalty corner is not permitted.) The attacking player must not feint and can only play the ball once (there is no rebound); the goalkeeper is not permitted to move their feet until the ball is played. A goal is scored if the ball completely crosses the line. Otherwise, play resumes with a defensive 15 m free-hit. Any infringement by an attacking player during the stroke concludes in the same result, an infringement by a defensive player may result in the penalty stroke being retaken if a goal has not been scored.

== History ==
The first equivalent penalty in the rules was introduced in 1908 and known as a penalty bully, a form of bully-off between the offending player and any player from the attacking team. Other players could not take part until the penalty bully was complete and had to remain outside the penalty circle; in 1909 this was revised to remaining beyond the 25-yard line (now known as the 23-metre line). The penalty bully would cease when either a goal had been scored or the ball was played out of the penalty circle or over the back line by the attacker. Play was then resumed with a normal bully-off at the centre of the 25-yard line. If the ball was played over the back line by the defender (outside the goal) then the penalty bully was retaken. A foul during the penalty bully could result in a penalty goal.

In 1963, the penalty stroke replaced the penalty bully and was awarded for deliberately stopping a certain goal. Then the penalty spot was 8 yards (7.3 m) from goal. In 1973, a stroke could also be awarded for a deliberate foul in the circle. The penalty spot was moved to its current position in 1974. Penalty goals could also be awarded for intentional fouls during a penalty stroke until 2009.

== See also ==
- Penalty corner
- Penalty shoot-out
