= Beikou =

Boikoo tarkbei or Daur hockey is a game similar to field hockey or street hockey. It has been played for about 1,000 years by the Daur people, an ethnic group from Inner Mongolia, China.

The game involves teams of men playing a ball-like knob of apricot root with long wooden branches. At night, the game is played with a felt-covered ball that is set alight. A game is reported to last for two periods of roughly 15 minutes.

Poolie tarkbei is the Daur version of polo. Boikoo and poolie are two popular game among Daurs.

Some Daurs believe the Daur term boikoo and poolie was originated from Chinese term buqiu (budaqiu or buqiu was a popular game in Tang China) and Tibetan term polon, and deny the Khitan origin of Daurs. Others believe the Daur boikoo was originated from the Khitan hockey.

When Western field hockey was introduced to China, it was taken up enthusiastically by the Daurs, whose affinity for the game has helped China to improve its global standing in field hockey. At the 2008 Summer Olympics, a third of the Chinese men's field hockey team was from Morin Dawa, a city in the Morin Dawa Daur Autonomous Banner in Inner Mongolia.
