= Drag flick =

Field hockey technique

Drag flicking is a scoring technique in the sport of field hockey. It was first seen in the late 1980s in Australia. It is used as an attacking technique, mainly within penalty corner involving two main components known as the scoop and flick. The technique involves a running up, and then forceful 'slinging' technique of the ball around your body, towards the goals.

== Technique ==
The action involves a player crouching low down next to the ball and picking it up on the shaft of the hockey stick. The ball is then pushed along the ground whilst the stick is moving with a 'slinging' action. This serves to accelerate the ball, which is eventually released in a goalwards direction, often raised.

Drag flicks are especially common during penalty corners, and are used as a variant to the 'straight shot' or hit. The main difference between the drag flick and the hit is that the drag flick is classified in the rules of field hockey, as a push, which are allowed to be raised higher from a penalty corner first shot. This has created a controversy, as drag flicks, although being allowed to be lifted at goals (and consequently the defenders within the goal), are often nearly as powerful as a hit. This leads to danger and a high risk of injuries.

The differentiation to a simple flick is that for drag-flicking the player accelerates the ball from behind, leveraging the ball past his body and thus achieving a higher speed. Flicks are often used to quickly transfer the ball to an attacker when defence inhibits a flat pass. Besides, the technique of drag-flicking is not easy to perform when the ball is moving.

== Rules ==
Although it is a somewhat dangerous piece of play for the opposition, it is within the rules and an effective technique for scoring. As drag flicking is not hitting the ball, the flicker is allowed to raise the ball at goals, hence making it a much more deadly alternative to hitting from the penalty corner as direct hitting shots on goal are not allowed to be above backboard height (460mm) during these set pieces.

There have been recent calls for further changes to the FIH rulings. The FIH official rules states that a bow's maximum curvature from a rest position can be no more than 25 mm. To traverse this, many top stick manufacturers began to build sticks with one significantly heavier edge than the other, thus, when the stick was put at rest, it tilted to one side, reducing the measure curvature. Using this loophole, many stick manufacturers have produced sticks that have bows much greater than 25 mm, sometimes even exceeding 35 mm.

If a field player is injured during a penalty corner and has to leave the field for medical attention, a replacement player cannot enter the field until the penalty corner ends. Calum Giles (GB) was noted for being the best drag-flicker during this time, scoring 110 goals in 143 caps. Most national teams have a flicking expert within their sides, with some notable figures including Sohail Abbas of Pakistan, Sandeep Singh, VR Ragunath and Rupinder Pal Singh of India, Taeke Taekema of the Netherlands, Troy Elder of Australia and Hayden Shaw of New Zealand. Generally speed of drag flicks are in excess of 80 mph.

== History ==
As players became more and more athletic as the game developed, certain shots were made illegal during penalty corners. However, as umpires become more and more strict within field hockey as new discoveries of techniques and training are subsequently making the sport more dangerous while also increasing the pace of the game.

Jay Stacy (former record holder for most caps for the Kookaburras) is credited as first using the skill in the 1987 Australian Hockey Championships in Hobart.

Along with changes in stick topography, as the drag flick became more prolific, it introduced the specialist drag flicker into a hockey team. In some cases, the drag flicker was not even part of the standard team but was substituted for a field player whenever a team was awarded a penalty corner. As soon as the penalty corner was over, the substitution was reversed. Because of this, it is now disallowed to substitute whenever a penalty corner situation is in effect, except for an injured goalkeeper, who may be substituted at any time.

It is evident that the drag flick is becoming more and more popular means of scoring even outside the penalty corner advantage. As drag flicks have become more popular, specialist hockey sticks have been designed to complement the slinging action of the shot. These sticks are notable for their 'bow' or curve. An example of this would be hockey equipment manufacturer Grays International's Jumbow and Megabow range, which featured sticks from their GX series with greatly increased curvature. In 2005, the International Hockey Federation (FIH) limited the possible size of 'bows' allowed in international competitions which is now limited to 25 mm. The reason for this was that sticks with extravagant bows began to emerge. This led to dangerous levels of power being generated. (see Field Hockey#Equipment).
