= Penalty corner =

Field hockey penalty

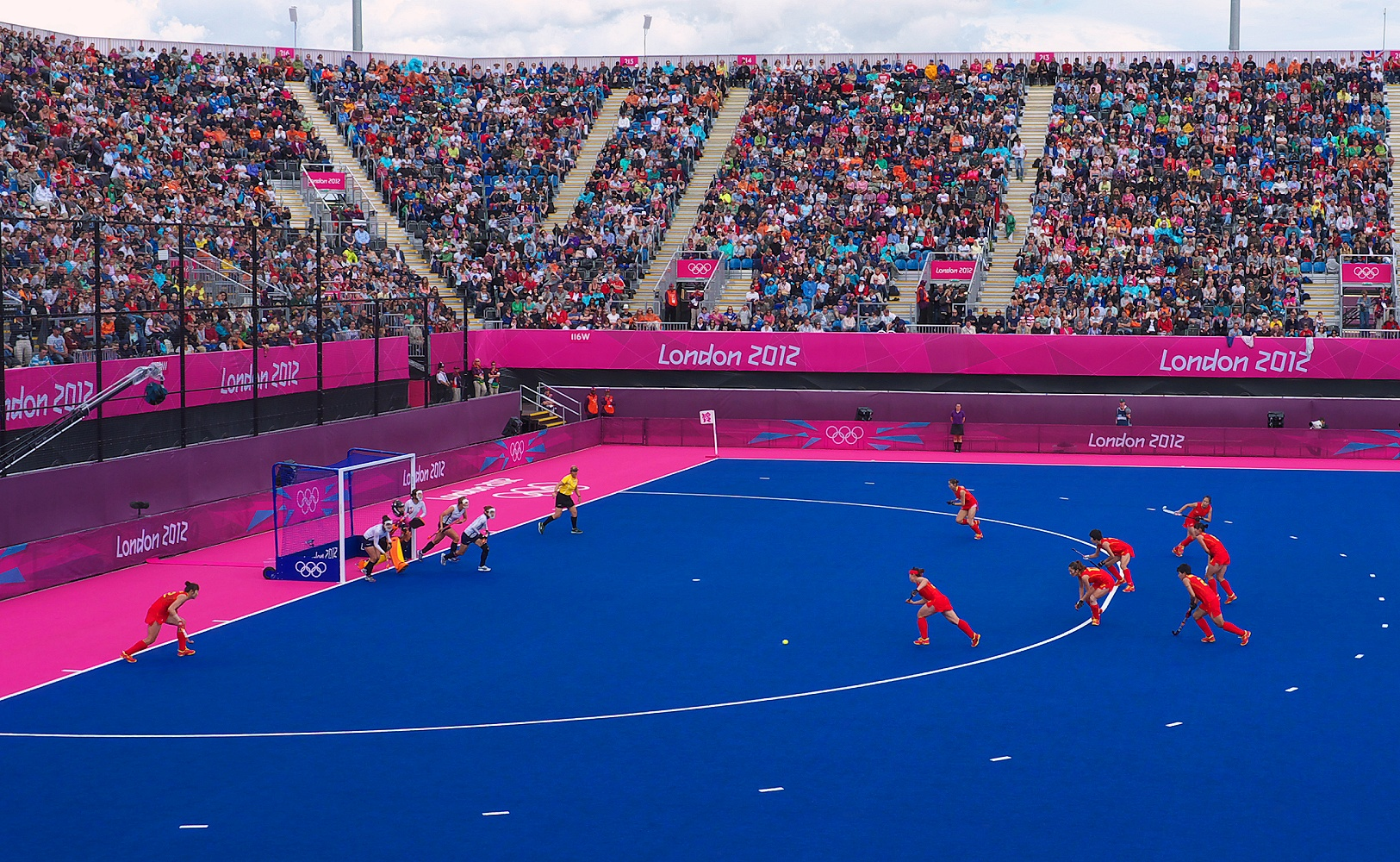
Penalty corner for China against South Korea during London Olympics 2012

In field hockey, a penalty corner, sometimes known as a short corner, is a penalty given against the defending team. It is predominantly awarded for a defensive infringement in the penalty circle or for a deliberate infringement within the defensive 23-metre area. They are eagerly sought by attacking players and provide an excellent opportunity to score. There are particular rules for that only apply at penalty corners and players develop specialist skills, such as the drag flick, for this particular phase in the game.

The penalty corner has always been an important part of the game, and that importance has become more pronounced since artificial turf became mandatory for top-level competitions in the 1970s. The importance of penalty corners has drawn criticism, with the proportion of field goals (Note: A "field goal" is one scored through open play as opposed to a penalty corner or penalty stroke) scored through open play reduced as attackers look to create a foul in the penalty circle, particularly from defenders' feet, rather than shooting directly.

The Netherlands' Paul Litjens was the former leading international scorer with 267 goals in 177 matches and was a specialist in hitting goals from penalty corners. Litjens and early specialists were accurate, hard-hitters of the ball; however, the introduction of the drag flick to counter the goalkeepers that lie down during the hit became the favoured technique. This led to the introduction of experts in this skill and Litjens' record was surpassed by Pakistani player Sohail Abbas who is often described as the "world's best" penalty corner and drag flick specialist. India's Sandeep Singh is also regarded as one of the best and has the fastest drag-flick at 145 km/h (90 mph).

== Awarding a penalty corner ==
There are five ways a penalty corner may be awarded:

- For an offence by a defending player in their penalty circle that does not prevent the "probable scoring of a goal". (Note: An offense that did prevent the "probable scoring of a goal" would result in a penalty stroke.)
- For an intentional offence by a defending player outside their penalty circle but within the 23-metre (25-yard) area they are defending
- For deliberately playing the ball over the backline. However, a goalkeeper is permitted to deflect the ball over the backline. (Note: When a ball is deflected over the backline by the goalkeeper or is unintentially played over the backline by a defender this results in a long corner.)
- For an intentional offence by a defender in their penalty circle against an opponent who "does not have possession of the ball or an opportunity to play the ball."
- When the ball becomes lodged in a defending player's clothing or equipment within the penalty circle.

== Procedure ==
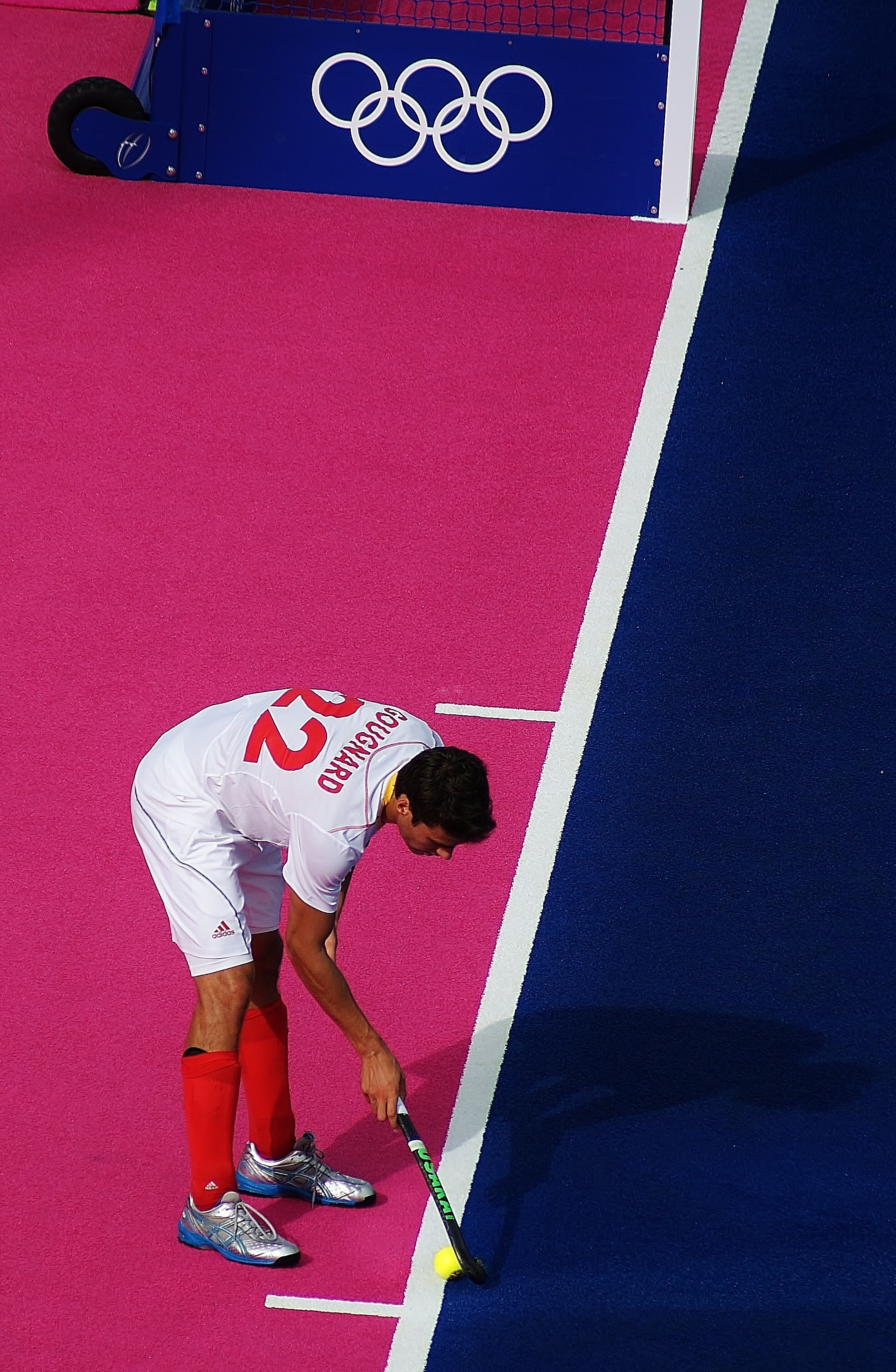
Simon Gougnard prepares to take a penalty corner from the 10 m mark. The 5 m line above demarcates the closest position a defender may stand.

To award a penalty corner, the umpire points both arms horizontally towards the respective goal. Although time in the match is not stopped, it may be prolonged beyond half-time or full-time to allow for the completion of a penalty corner, or any subsequent penalty corner or penalty stroke. However, as of September 2014, an intended rule change will give a 40-second timeout for a penalty corner.

When a penalty corner is awarded, a maximum of five defending players (including the goalkeeper) line up behind the back line either in the goal or on the back line at least five metres from the ball. All other players on the defending team must be behind the centre line. One attacking player places themselves on the back line, with the ball in the circle at least 10 metres from the nearest goal post on either side of the goal. The remainder of the attacking team players place themselves on the field outside of the shooting circle. All players other than the attacking player on the back line must not have any part of their body or stick touch the ground inside the circle or over the centre line until the ball is in play. The attacking player on the back line is allowed one foot within the circle, but the other foot must remain behind the back line. If any player enters the circle or crosses the centre line prematurely, or the attacking player on the back line does not have one foot outside the circle, the penalty corner is reset and taken again.

When the attacking player on the back line pushes the ball into play, the players may then enter the shooting circle or cross the centre line. Before a shot at goal can be taken, the ball must first travel outside the circle. In a typical penalty corner, the attacking player on the back line will push the ball to a player at the top of the circle who will stop the ball just outside the circle. Another player will take the stopped ball and push or drag it back into the circle before attempting to shoot at goal (as per normal rules, the ball must be last played by an attacking player within the shooting circle for a goal to count).

If the first attempt at goal in a penalty corner is hit, as opposed to a flick, scoop or push, the ball must be hit so that it will be travelling no higher than the backboard in the goal (460 mm or 18 in) at the point when it crosses the goal line, for the goal to count. This must be assessed regardless of any deflections, so for example, if the ball is hit on a trajectory that would see it crossing the goal line below the required height then a goal will be awarded even if it is deflected over this height and into the goal. Conversely, it does not matter that the ball travels above 460 mm in its flight, provided it does not constitute dangerous play, so long as it drops below 460 mm under its own accord (i.e. not as a result of a deflection) before crossing the goal line, it is still counted as a goal. Flicks, scoops, pushes, deflections and hits on second and subsequent attempts at goal may cross the goal line at any height, provided it does not constitute dangerous play.

The penalty corner ends when a goal is scored, the ball is played over the back line and another penalty corner is not awarded, a penalty stroke is awarded, the defending team is awarded a free hit, or the ball travels more than 5 metres outside the circle (i.e. beyond the dotted line outside the shooting circle).

== History ==
The penalty corner was introduced in 1908, and required all attacking players to be outside the penalty circle and all defenders behind the goalline. Early penalty corners only required the ball to be stopped before a shot and was not required to be stopped or travel outside the penalty circle.

In the first set of hockey rules (1886) the use of hands and feet was permitted to stop the ball; the use of feet was outlawed in 1938 but hands could still be used to stop the ball. As such, a hand stop became a large part of early penalty corners; one player would inject, a second would hand stop and the third would shoot. In 1961, the number of defenders behind the goalline was reduced to six; the remainder had to stand beyond the 25-yard line (Note: Following the metricisation of units in 1998 this became the 23-metre line) and two years later this became the halfway line. There were too many goals from penalty corners and the use of the hands to stop the ball, and thus the hand stop, were prohibited from 1982; a result was that the same player at a penalty corner would stop and strike the ball. A few years later, in 1987, the number of defenders was reduced to the current quota of five. Additionally, it was required that the first hit at goal could must cross the goalline at a height no greater than 18 inches (460 mm) for a goal to be awarded – this rule ceased to apply once the ball had travelled more than 5 yards (Note: Following the metricisation of units in 1998 this became 5 metres) outside (i.e. away from) the penalty circle. In 1998, the location where the ball was injected was metricised to at least 10 metres from the goal post (as opposed to the previous rule which stated it must be at least 10 yards); a specific mark inside the circle was introduced in 2000. Additionally, for a period from 1995, substitutions were permitted at penalty corners. This rule caused the development of specialist penalty corner takers who just came on for this and was abolished three years later. In 1996, a penalty corner required that the ball was stopped outside the circle before a goal could be scored. From 2003, it did not need to be stopped but did have to travel outside the circle.

== See also ==
- Field hockey history
- Penalty stroke
- Penalty shoot-out
