= Salima Tete =

Indian field hockey player

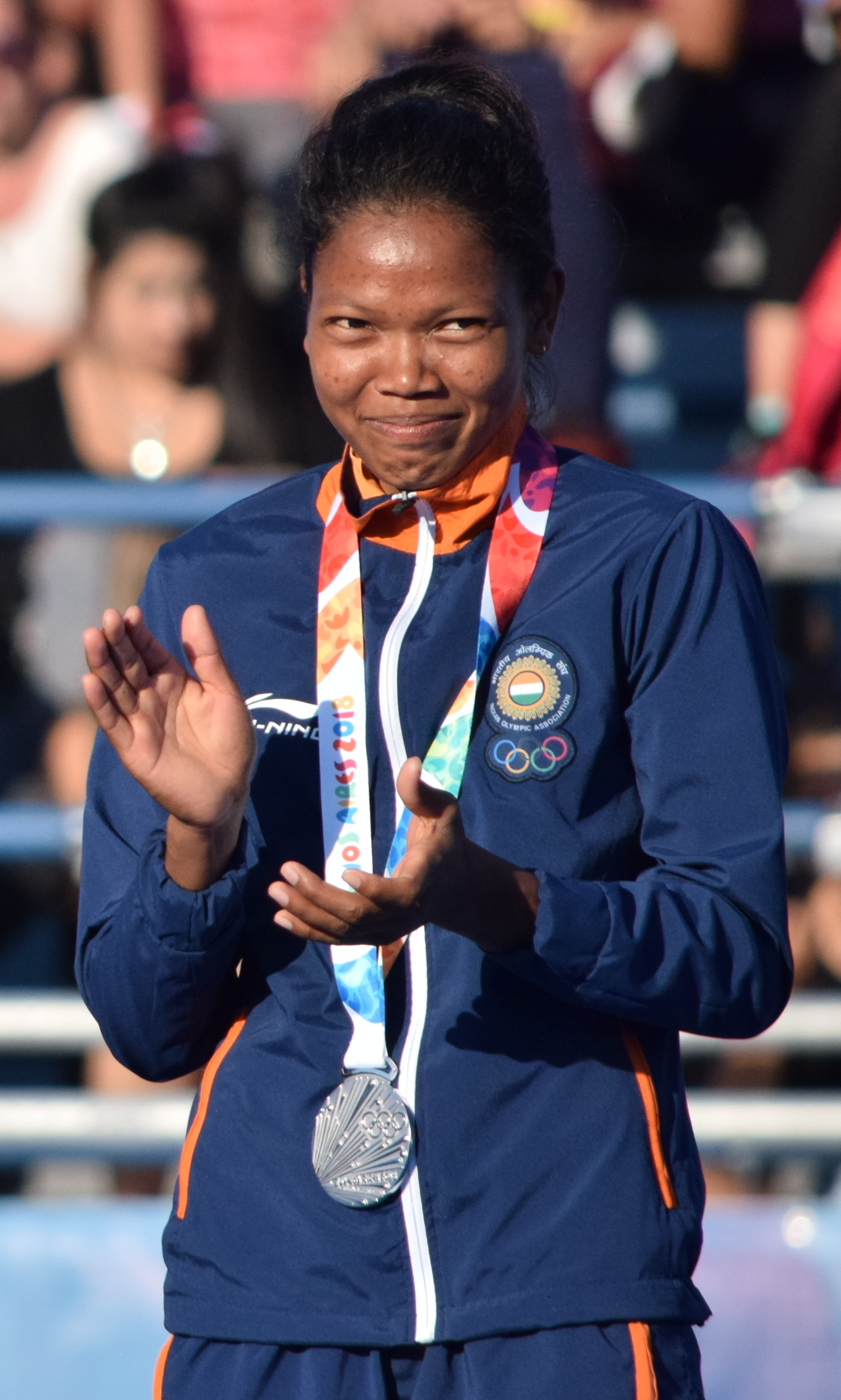
- Salima Tete at the 2018 Summer Youth Olympics

Personal information
- Born: 27 December 2001 (age 24) Simdega, Jharkhand, India

Sport
- Sport: Field hockey
- Position: Midfielder
Youth career
- Years: Team
- 2016–: India U18
- 2018–: India U18 Hockey5's
Senior career
Years	Team	Caps	Goals
–	Hockey Jharkhand	-	-
–	Railways	-	-
2025–	Soorma Hockey Club	-	-
National team
Years	Team	Caps	Goals
2016–2022	India U21	10	(0)
2016–	India	168	(21)
Medal record
Women's field hockey
Representing India
Commonwealth Games
Bronze medal – third place	2022 Birmingham	Team
Asian Games
Gold medal – first place	2026 Aichi–Nagoya	Team
Bronze medal – third place	2022 Hangzhou	Team
Asia Cup
Silver medal – second place	2025 Hangzhou
Bronze medal – third place	2022 Muscat
Asian Champions Trophy
Gold medal – first place	2023 Ranchi
Gold medal – first place	2024 Rajgir
FIH Nations Cup
Gold medal – first place	2022 Spain
Youth Olympic Games
Silver medal – second place	2018 Buenos Aires	Team
Girls' Asia Cup
Bronze medal – third place	2016 Bangkok

Salima Tete (born 26 December 2001) is an Indian field hockey player. On 2 May 2023, she was named as the captain of the Indian hockey team. On October 2, 2026, Salima Tete led the Indian team to win the gold medal at the Asian Games, defeating China 1–0 in the final in Kakamigahara, Japan.

== Early life and background ==
Tete is from Debdoot Sheet village in the Simdega district of Jharkhand. Both her parents work as farmers. Her father also played hockey.

== Career ==
She made her debut for the national side in 2017 against Belarus.

At the 2018 Youth Olympic games, she was the captain of the Indian youth hockey5s team, which went on to win a silver medal.

In 2021, she was selected in the Indian squad for the Tokyo Olympics.
