= Suman Devi Thoudam =

Indian field hockey player

Suman Devi
Personal information
- Full name: Suman Devi Thoudam
- Born: 16 July 1999 (age 27) Imphal, Manipur, India

Sport
- Sport: Field hockey
- Position: Defender
- Club: Indian Oil Corporation Ltd.
Youth career
- Years: Team
- 2016–: India U18
Senior career
Years	Team	Caps	Goals
–	Madhya Pradesh Hockey Academy	-	-
–	Indian Oil Corporation Ltd.	-	-
National team
Years	Team	Caps	Goals
2017–	India	27	(0)
Medal record
Women's field hockey
Representing India
Asia Cup
Silver medal – second place	2025 Hangzhou
Asian Champions Trophy
Silver medal – second place	2018 Donghae
Girls' Asia Cup
Bronze medal – third place	2016 Bangkok

Suman Devi Thoudam is an Indian field hockey player from Manipur. She has represented India internationally and plays the position of a defender. She has played 11 international matches as of July 2018.

== Early life ==
Suman Devi Thoudam hails from Singjamei Monkhanglambi in Imphal, from the state of Manipur. Born in 1998, she is the oldest daughter of Thoudam Anand. She started her hockey career at a young age, participating in inter-school tournaments in Delhi and in Amritsar in 2011, as well as larger state tournaments like the Sub Junior National in Patna in 2011 and Jawaharlal Nehru Tournaments in 2013 (runners up) and in 2012 (runners up).

She continued to represent her state for the next few years in junior tournaments, and participated in Sub Junior National in Pune 2014 (winner), Sub Junior National Bhopal 2013 (runners up), Junior National 2014 in Mysore (runners up), Junior National 2013 in Ranchi (runners up) and Sub Junior Zonal in Mumbai.

== Career ==
From national tournaments, Suman moved on to representing her country internationally. She was a part of the Indian youth hockey team which won the World Youth Hockey Tournament (under-18) held in Netherlands on 11 and 12 August 2014, for which she was felicitated by her old training institute, the South East Youth Organisation. She was named for the India U18 team for the 2016 Youth Asia Cup, where they won bronze. She also participated in the Asia Cup 2017, where her contribution led to India building a strong defence and conceding only 5 goals in the 6-match tournament, and eventually going on to win the tournament as continental champions and earning them a qualifying spot at the Hockey World Cup.

In the run-up to the Hockey World Cup 2018 in London, the Indian women's hockey team participated in the Spain Tour where they played five matches against the Spanish National team starting 12 June 2018. Suman was a part of the 20-member squad of the Spain Tour, which defeated the host Spanish team 4–1 in the 5-match series. However, she was not chosen to be a part of the final World Cup squad.

Suman was also a part of the Indian junior women's hockey team, and participated in the Under-23 Six Nations Tournament held between 14 and 21 July 2018 in Antwerp, Belgium.
