= Sangita Kumari (field hockey) =

Indian field hockey player

Personal information
- Born: 24 December 2001 (age 24) Karangaguri, Simdega, Jharkhand, India

Sport
- Sport: Field hockey
- Position: Forward
Youth career
- Years: Team
- 2016: India U18
- 2018: India U18 Hockey5s
Senior career
Years	Team	Caps	Goals
–	Hockey Jharkhand	-	-
–	Railways	-	-
–	Delhi SG Pipers	-	-
National team
Years	Team	Caps	Goals
2016–2022	India U21	10	(4)
2022–	India	71	(30)
Medal record
Women's field hockey
Representing India
Commonwealth Games
Bronze medal – third place	2022 Birmingham	Team
Asian Games
Bronze medal – third place	2022 Hangzhou	Team
Asia Cup
Silver medal – second place	2025 Hangzhou
FIH Nations Cup
Gold medal – first place	2022 Spain
Asian Champions Trophy
Gold medal – first place	2023 Ranchi
Gold medal – first place	2024 Rajgir
Girls' Asia Cup
Bronze medal – third place	2016 Bangkok

Sangita Kumari (born 24 December 2001) is an Indian field hockey player and member of Indian women hockey team.

== Early life ==
Sangita Kumari was born in the village of Karangaguri Nawatoli in Simdega district in state of Jharkhand to Ranjit Majhi and Lakhmani Devi. She was selected in state women hockey training centre in 2012.

== Career ==
=== Under–18 ===
Sangita represented India girls' teams for the 2016 youth Asia Cup. She scored eight goals in the tournament and contributed for her team's bronze.

=== Under–21 ===
In 2016, Sangita was named in the India U–21 squad for a five-nations tournament in Valencia.

Sangita was not named in the junior squad again until 2022, for the FIH Junior World Cup in Potchefstroom.

=== National team ===
Sangita made her senior debut for India in 2022. Her first appearance was during season three of the FIH Pro League, in India's homes matches against Spain. In her debut match, she scored her first international goal. In 2022 Commonwealth Games, Indian women hockey team won bronze medal.

=== International goals ===
Goal	Date	Location	Opponent	Score	Result	Competition	Ref.
1	27 February 2022	Kalinga Stadium, Bhubaneswar, India	Spain	1–1	3–4	2021–22 FIH Pro League	
