= Nousheen Naz =

Indian field hockey player

Personal information
- Born: 13 July 2010 (age 16) Seoni, Madhya Pradesh, India

Sport
- Sport: Field hockey
- Position: Forward
Senior career
Years	Team	Caps	Goals
2024–	Hockey Madhya Pradesh	14	25
2026–	Madhya Pradesh Hockey Academy	4	6
National team
Years	Team	Caps	Goals
2026–	India U18	5	(12)
2026–	India U18 Hockey5's	8	(17)
Medal record
Women's field hockey
Representing India
Girls' Asia Cup
Bronze medal – third place	2026 Kakamigahara
Girls' Hockey5's Asia Cup
Silver medal – second place	2026 Muscat

Nousheen Naz (born 13 July 2010) is an Indian field hockey player who plays as a forward for the national girls' hockey team and girls' hockey5's team.

== Early life ==
Nousheen Naz hails from Seoni, Madhya Pradesh. Her father is a vegetable seller and a truck driver. She was inspired to take up hockey by her elder sister, Tahoor Naz, but initially struggled to obtain hockey sticks and played with broken ones.

== Career ==
Naz's hockey talent was first identified by her coach, Paramjit Singh, who encouraged her to join the Madhya Pradesh Women’s Hockey Academy in Gwalior. She was the top scorer at the 16th Hockey India Sub Junior Women's National Championship 2026, with nine goals.

She later attended the national camp at the Sports Authority of India (SAI) centre in Bhopal, where she was selected to represent India at the 2026 Girls' Asia Cup. She also scored a goal against Australia in a practice match, helping India to a 4–1 victory.

At the U18 Asia Cup, Nousheen scored two goals in the opening match against Malaysia, as India won 2–1. She also scored seven against Singapore in a record 25–0 win. She gave India an early lead in the semi-final contest against China but lost in the shoot-out. She scored one for her team to win the bronze against South Korea and she finished as the top scorer of the tournament, with 12 goals.

Nousheen was selected to the Indian girls hockey5's team for the inaugural girls' hockey5's Asian Championship in Muscat. She was the top scorer in that tournament with 17 goals as her team settled with silver.
