= Rani Rampal =

Indian field hockey player

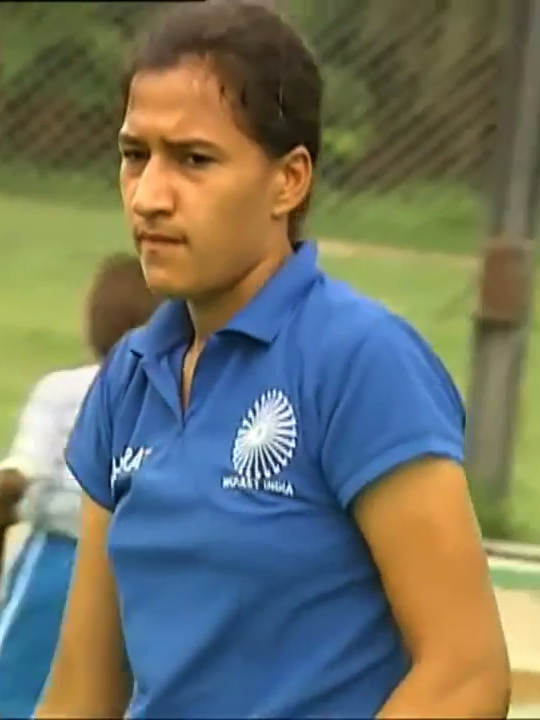

Personal information
- Born: 4 December 1994 (age 31) Shahabad Markanda, Kurukshetra, Haryana, India
- Height: 1.65 m (5 ft 5 in)
- Weight: 60 kg (132 lb)

Sport
- Sport: Field hockey
- Position: Forward
- Club: Sports Authority of India
Senior career
Years	Team	Caps	Goals
–	Hockey Haryana	-	-
–	Sports Authority of India	-	-
National team
Years	Team	Caps	Goals
2008–2023	India	254	(120)
Coaching career
- 2023–: India U18
- 2026–: India U18 Hockey5's
Medal record
Women's field hockey
Representing India
Asian Games
Silver medal – second place	2018 Jakarta	Team
Bronze medal – third place	2014 Incheon	Team
Asia Cup
Gold medal – first place	2017 Gifu
Silver medal – second place	2009 Bangkok
Bronze medal – third place	2013 Kuala Lumpur
Asian Champions Trophy
Gold medal – first place	2016 Singapore
Silver medal – second place	2013 Kakamigahara
Bronze medal – third place	2010 Busan
South Asian Games
Gold medal – first place	2016 Guwahati	Team
Junior World Cup
Bronze medal – third place	2013 Mönchengladbach	Team

Rani Rampal (born 4 December 1994) is an Indian field hockey coach and former player who played as a forward. At the age of 15, she was the youngest in the national squad of the 2010 World Cup. In her career, Rampal played 212 international matches and scored 134 goals. She also acted as a striker and doubled up as mid-fielder. In 2020, the Government of India honoured her with the Padma Shri.

== Early life ==
Rani was born on 4 December 1994 in Shahabad Markanda in the Kurukshetra district of Haryana. Her father works as a cart-puller. She was registered in the town's team by the age of 6. Initially her abilities were questioned but later on she demonstrated her potential to her coach. She took to field hockey in 2003 and trained at the Shahabad Hockey Academy under Baldev Singh, a recipient of Dronacharya Award. She first came to Junior Nationals in Gwalior and at Chandigarh School Nationals and she was later admitted into national squad. She made her Senior year debut when she was only 14 years, which made her the youngest player in the Indian Women's Hockey team. As she started to play professionally, GoSports Foundation, a sports non-governmental organization provided her with monetary and non-monetary support as her family found it hard to support her dreams financially. She was part of Indian Hockey Team when the team qualified for 2016 Rio Olympics after 36 years. Under her Captaincy India reached in the semifinal in 2020 Tokyo Olympics first time in the history of India after inclusion of Women's hockey in olympics.

== Career ==
Rani played in the Champion's Challenge Tournament held in Kazan, Russia in June 2009 and powered India to a win by scoring 4 goals in the finals. She was adjudged "The Top Goal Scorer" and the "Young Player of the Tournament."

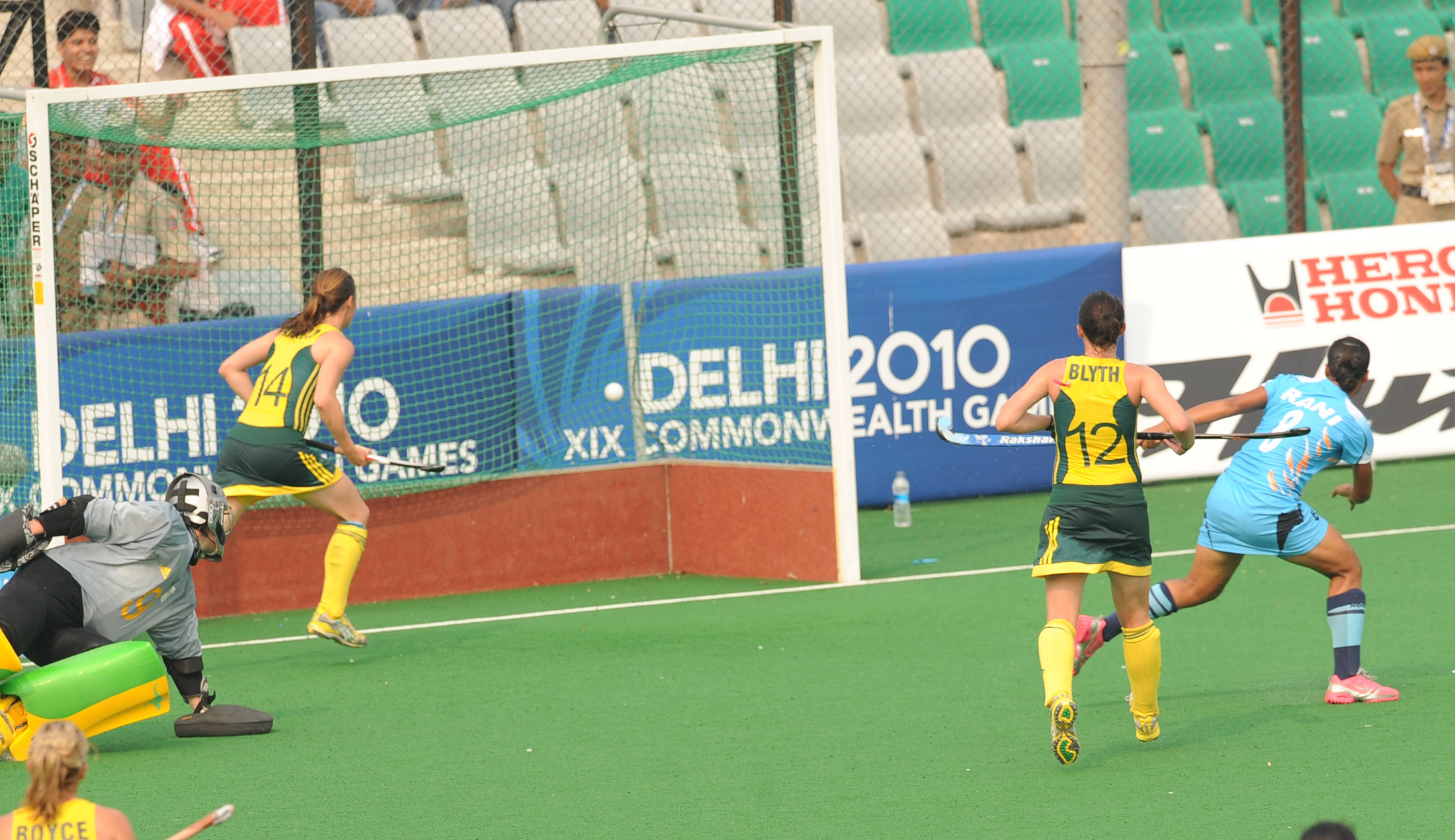
Rampal (right) at the 2010 Commonwealth Games

She was instrumental in winning the silver medal for the Indian team in the Asia Cup held in November 2009. After playing with India's national team at 2010 Commonwealth Games and 2010 Asian Games, Rani Rampal was nominated in FIH Women's All-Star Team of 2010. She was nominated for ' young woman player of the year' award. She was also included the All-Star team of the Asian Hockey Federation based on her performance in 2010 Asian Games at Guangzhou.

At the 2010 Women’s Hockey World Cup held in Rosario, Argentina, she scored a total of seven goals which placed India in the ninth position in World Women's hockey rankings. This is India's best performance since 1978. She is the only Indian to be nominated for the FIH Women's Young Player of the Year Award, 2010. She was conferred the "Best Young Player of the Tournament" award at the Women's Hockey World Cup 2010, recognizing her stellar performance as the top field goal scorer in the tournament. She was awarded with the Arjuna award in 2016 which was like one of her dreams come true.

She was also adjudged the 'Player of the Tournament' at the 2013 Junior World Cup which India finished with a bronze medal. She has been named for FICCI Comeback of the Year Award 2014. In 2013 Junior World Cup she made India won its first ever bronze medal at the event.

She was part of 2017 Women's Asian Cup, and they also won the title second time in 2017 at Kakamigahara in Japan, for the first time the trophy was brought in year 2004, due to this they got selected for world cup which was held in 2018.

She led the Indian women's hockey team as captain in 2018 Asian Games, where they won a silver medal and was India's flag-bearer for the closing ceremony of the games.

She worked as Assistant Coach with Sports Authority Of India. She is the coach of Indian girls' team that won bronze at the 2026 Youth Asia Cup. She also coaches the girls' hockey5's team that finished with silver at the inaugural 2026 Women's U18 Hockey5's Asia Cup.

== Awards ==
- Major Dhyan Chand Khel Ratna (2020) - Highest Sporting Honour of India.
- Padma Shri (2020) - fourth Highest Indian National Honour
- Arjuna Award (2016) - Second highest sporting honour of India
