= U18 Hockey5s Youth Africa Cup =

Field hockey tournament

- Most recent season or competition: 2026 U18 Hockey5s Youth Africa Cup
- Sport: Hockey5s
- Founded: 2026; 0 years ago
- First season: 2026
- Confederation: AfHF (Africa)
- Most recent champions: M: Kenya; W: South Africa (2026)
- Most titles: M: Kenya; W: South Africa (1 Title)

The U18 Hockey5s Youth Africa Cup is an under-18 youth international Hockey5's tournament organized by the African Hockey Federation. The event is played in Hockey 5s format, a 5-a-side game that is played on a smaller field size. The winning teams from both boys' and girls' tournaments becomes the champions of Africa and qualifies for the Men's and Women's FIH Youth Hockey5s World Cup respectively.

The first edition took place in Nairobi from 6–8 August 2026, won by Kenya boys' and South Africa girls' teams.

== Boys' Summary ==
=== Results ===
Year	Host	Final			Third place match			Number of teams
Year	Host	Winner	Score	Runner-up	Third place	Score	Fourth place	Number of teams
2026; Details	Nairobi, Kenya	Kenya	6–5	South Africa	Nigeria	15–2	Uganda	4

=== Successful national teams ===
Teams reaching the top four
Team	Champions	Runners-up	Third place	Fourth place
Kenya	1 (2026*)			
South Africa		1 (2026)		
Nigeria			1 (2026)	
Uganda				1 (2026)

* = host country

=== Team appearances ===
Team	(Kenya) 2026	Total
Kenya	1st	1
Nigeria	3rd	1
South Africa	2nd	1
Uganda	4th	1
Total (4)	4	

=== Debut of teams ===
Year	Debutants	Total
2026	Kenya, Nigeria, South Africa, Uganda	4
Total		4

== Girls' Summary ==
=== Results ===
Year	Host	Final			Third place match			Number of teams
Year	Host	Winner	Score	Runner-up	Third place	Score	Fourth place	Number of teams
2026; Details	Nairobi, Kenya	South Africa	11–6	Kenya	Nigeria	4–3	Ghana	5

=== Successful national teams ===
Teams reaching the top four
Team	Champions	Runners-up	Third place	Fourth place
South Africa	1 (2026)			
Kenya		1 (2026*)		
Nigeria			1 (2026)	
Ghana				1 (2026)

* = host country

=== Team appearances ===
Team	(Kenya) 2026	Total
Ghana	4th	1
Kenya	2nd	1
Nigeria	3rd	1
South Africa	1st	1
Uganda	5th	1
Total (5)	5	

=== Debut of teams ===
Year	Debutants	Total
2026	Ghana, Kenya, Nigeria, South Africa, Uganda	5
Total		5
