= Women's U18 Hockey5's Asia Cup =

- Most recent season or competition: 2026 Women's U18 Hockey5's Asia Cup
- Sport: Hockey5s
- Founded: 2026; 0 years ago
- First season: 2026
- No. of teams: 7
- Confederation: AHF (Asia)
- Most recent champion: China (2026)
- Most titles: China (1 Title)

The Women's U18 Hockey5's Asia Cup is an under-18 youth international Hockey5's tournament organized by the Asian Hockey Federation. This event is played in Hockey 5s format, a 5-a-side game that is played on a smaller field size. The winning team becomes the champion of Asia and qualifies for the FIH U18 Youth Hockey5's World Cup.

The first edition took place in Muscat from 20–25 July 2026, won by China.

== Results ==
#	Year	Host	Final			Third place match			Teams
#	Year	Host	Winner	Score	Runner-up	Third place	Score	Fourth place	Teams
1	2026; Details	Muscat, Oman	China	4–2	India	Kazakhstan	9–0	Iran	7

== Successful national teams ==
Teams reaching the top four
Team	Champions	Runners-up	Third place	Fourth place
China	1 (2026)			
India		1 (2026)		
Kazakhstan			1 (2026)	
Iran				1 (2026)

* = host country

=== Team appearances ===
Team	(Oman) 2026	Total
China	1st	1
India	2nd	1
Iran	4th	1
Kazakhstan	3rd	1
Oman	7th	1
Pakistan	6th	1
Uzbekistan	5th	1
Total (7)	7	

=== Debut of teams ===
Year	Debutants	Total
2026	China, India, Iran, Kazakhstan, Oman, Pakistan, Uzbekistan	7
Total		7

== See also ==
- Men's U18 Hockey5's Asia Cup
- Women's Hockey U18 Asia Cup
- Women's Hockey5s Asia Cup
