= 2026 Women's Hockey U18 Asia Cup =

Asian field hockey tournament

Tournament details
- Host country: Japan
- City: Kakamigahara
- Dates: 29 May–6 June
- Teams: 8 (from 1 confederation)
- Venue: Kawasaki Heavy Industries Hockey Stadium

Final positions
- Champions: China (2nd title)
- Runner-up: Japan
- Third place: India

Tournament statistics
- Matches played: 18
- Goals scored: 113 (6.28 per match)
- Top scorer: (India) Nousheen Naz (12 goals)
- Best player: (China) Guo Jiaxin
- Best young player: (Japan) Rina Yamamoto
- Best goalkeeper: (South Korea) Hong Seoyeon

The 2026 Women's Hockey U18 Asia Cup was the sixth edition of the women's Hockey U18 Asia Cup. A total of eight Asian girls' national teams contested, organized by the Asian Hockey Federation. The tournament was held in Kakamigahara, Japan from 29 May to 6 June 2026, alongside the boys' tournament. China won the gold for the second time after beating the defending champions Japan by 2–1 in the final and India claimed the bronze, defeating South Korea by 3–0.

All matches were live-streamed on the official YouTube channel of the Asian Hockey Federation.

== Venue ==
(Japan) Kakamigahara
Kawasaki Heavy Industries Hockey Stadium
Capacity: 1,630
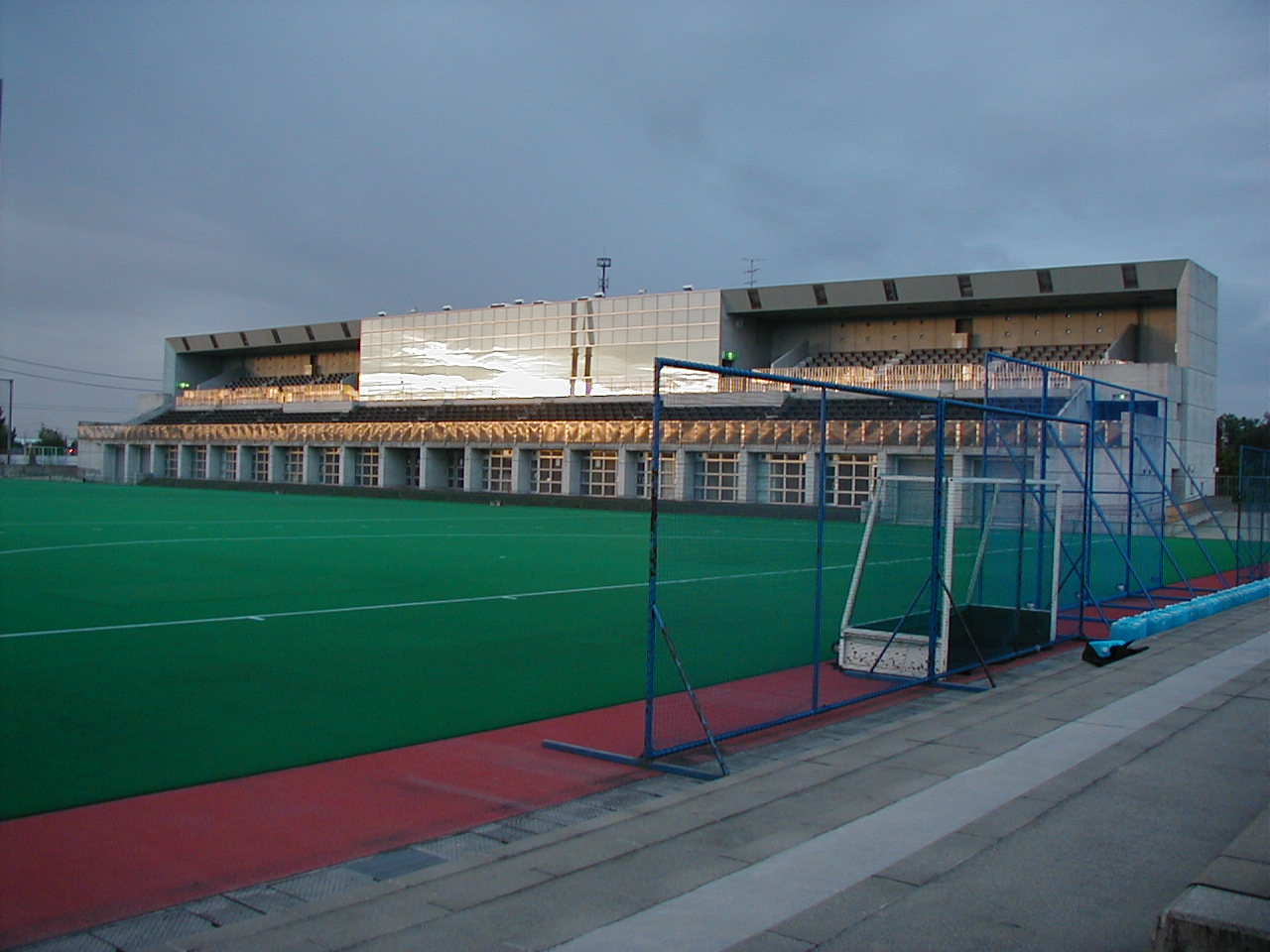

== Teams ==
Bangladesh

Head Coach: (Bangladesh) Zahid Hossain

1. Mst Khatun(GK)
2. Shosty Roy
3. Tanha Maisha
4. Mst Annika
5. Ninisen Rakhain
7. Suraya Safa
8. Prionti Oishi
10. Oishy Bany
11. Sharika Rimon(C)
12. Airin Riya
13. Mst Lima
14. Mst Khatun
15. Kona Akter
16. Nadira Ema
17. Mst Akter
18. Jakia Sultana(GK)
20. Lonima Nupur
21. Tasfiha Tisha
China

Head Coach: (China) Guo Jie

1. Xue Liu(GK)
4. Wanxin Yu
5. TianHui Wang
6. ZiHui Zhang
7. Wang Xinling
8. Liu ZiXin
10. Xinyu Yang
11. Guo Jiaxin(C)
12. Wang Enting
13. Chen Ge
14. XinYu Fu
16. Lu TongTong
17. Feng Jiaxin
18. Xuni Yuan
20. Li ZeYan
21. Sun Hongyan
28. Yuzheng Zhang
30. Chen Zhangmengzhi(GK)
Chinese Taipei

Head Coach: (Chinese Taipei) Min Nan Lin

1. Gu Yu-Tong(GK)
2. Chiang Chih-Tung
3. Wen-Tsen Wang(C)
4. Jhang Huei-Sin
5. Shu-Qin Ye
6. Chen Xiao-Qing
7. Fang-Chi Wu
8. Yu-Min Tsou
9. Tefi Ohoyi
10. Kao Hsiang-Hua
11. Ya-Wen Lin
12. Huang Yu-Si
13. Jhang Jia-Yu
14. Huang Yi-Chen
15. Chiang Xin-Pei
16. Pin-Chiao Su
17. Chang Chih-Hsien
18. Lin Rou-Jing(GK)
India

Head Coach: (India) Rani Rampal

1. Mahak Parihar(GK)
2. Nancy Saroha
3. Sulochani
4. Pushpa Manjhi
5. Nousheen Naz
8. Geethasri Nammi
9. Diya
10. Sneha Davde
11. Rubina Baxla
12. Priyanka Minz
14. Sugan Sanga
15. Sandeepa Kumari
16. Nilam Topno
20. Khili Kumari(GK)
25. Sweety Kujur(C)
27. Kiran Ekka
36. Rashmeen Kaur
63. Shruti Kumari
Japan

Head Coach: (Japan) Naoya Iwadate

2. Mori Noera(GK)
5. Kurumi Yoshida
6. Miyabi Horie(C)
8. Lisajane Bokhoven
9. Nina Yoshihara
10. Nana Hashimoto
11. Yuzuki Togawa
12. Hana Nishida
13. Haruka Hasegawa
14. Mai Kuwamoto
15. Chinatsu Aoki
16. Nene Fujii
17. Sayo Koike
18. Rina Yamamoto
21. Sara Watanabe
22. Noa Mimura
26. Yuno Sekiguchi
41. Mio Noda(GK)
42. Hana Morikawa
43. Ena Yasoshima
South Korea

Head Coach: (South Korea) Jeong Yongkyun

1. Hong Seoyeon(GK)
2. Park Dami
3. Chung Yewon
5. Lee Songhee
6. Jeon Gahee
7. Kwon Hayeon(C)
8. Jung Hyeonji
9. Lim Hyosun
10. Kim Jiwon
11. Ryu Gyeongmin
14. Tak Gaeun
15. Choi Jeongha
16. Jeon Ahyeon(GK)
17. Lee Hyeonju
18. Gong Ohyoon
19. Oh Suhyeon
22. Lee Jiae
27. Kim Minchae
Malaysia

Head Coach: (Malaysia) Siti Ruhani

1. Nur Hairul(GK)
2. Natashanajwa Nasharuddin
3. Nur Effendy
4. Raihan Roslizam
5. Irdina Jeffrey
6. Nurul Adnan
7. Aqhinatul Hashmi
8. Nur Firdaus
9. Erza Edger
10. Nur Zaini
11. Nur Azli
12. Nur Mazlan
13. Damia Jasman
14. Nurfitrah Shamsudin
15. Nur Misra
16. Siti Suhaimi(GK)
17. Khaleesya Khairul
18. Nur Mohd
Singapore

Head Coach: (Singapore) Luo Yingying

1. Andrea Seah(GK)
3. Xin Tay
5. Ally Zuraiddy
7. Tze Ng
8. Emma Liu(C)
10. Marabelle Lee
11. Melanie Chong
12. Akeelah Afdillah
16. Sandeep Shetty
17. Adelia Tan
22. Zerbel Choo
23. Collette Smith
26. Muhammad Hanafi Sofiya
28. Mohamad Nasrun Nur
29. Cindy Ong
30. Mohamed Khanafi Anisah
31. Olivia Koh
32. Sarahbelle Tay(GK)

== Preliminary round ==
=== Pool A ===
Pos	Team	Pld	W	D	L	GF	GA	GD	Pts	Qualification
1	India	3	3	0	0	30	2	+28	9	Semi-finals
2	South Korea	3	2	0	1	10	3	+7	6	Semi-finals
3	Malaysia	3	1	0	2	14	3	+11	3	5–6th place classification
4	Singapore	3	0	0	3	0	46	−46	0	7–8th place classification

Source: FIH
Rules for classification: 1) points; 2) matches won; 3) goal difference; 4) goals for; 5) head-to-head result; 6) field goals scored.

All times are local (UTC+9).

29 May 2026
19:00

South Korea	8–0	Singapore
Kwon 1', 11', 41', 60'; Kim. M 3', 24'; Ryu 49'; Kim. J 58'	Report

Umpires:
Saya Kato (JPN)
Xiaoxu Xu (CHN)

Player of the match – (South Korea) Kwon Hayeon

30 May 2026
09:00

India	2–1	Malaysia
Naz 19', 28'	Report	Azli 41'

Umpires:
Chikako Kasai (JPN)
Rinky See (HKG)

Player of the match – (India) Nausheen Naz

31 May 2026
09:00

South Korea	1–3	India
Ryu 41'	Report	Naz 4'; Sh. Kumari 21'; Ekka 43'

Umpires:
Hazatul Abd Razak (MAS)
Chikako Kasai (JPN)

Player of the match – (India) Kiran Ekka

31 May 2026
11:00

Malaysia	13–0	Singapore
Azli 5', 56'; Mohd 15', 44', 52'; Shamsudin 23', 42', 49'; Misra 25'; Khairul 29'; Mazlan 32', 54'; Hashmi 42'	Report

Umpires:
Jannatul Ferdous (BAN)
Saya Kato (JPN)

Player of the match – (Malaysia) Nurfitrah Shamsudin

2 June 2026
11:00

Malaysia	0–1	South Korea
	Report	Kwon 29'

Umpires:
Xiaoxu Xu (CHN)
Ghulam Mohieuddin (PAK)

Player of the match – (South Korea) Kwon Hayeon

3 June 2026
09:00

India	25–0	Singapore
Kujur 2', 24', 38', 45'; Naz 8', 13', 17', 18', 40', 52', 58'; Nammi 13', 28', 47', 48', 60'; Minz 22', 37', 53'; Diya 27'; Saroha 36'; Sh. Kumari 40'; Manjhi 47'; Rashmeen 47'; Sa. Kumari 51'	Report

Umpires:
Jannatul Ferdous (BAN)
Masaki Shimizu (JPN)

Player of the match – (India) Geethasri Nammi

=== Pool B ===
Pos	Team	Pld	W	D	L	GF	GA	GD	Pts	Qualification
1	Japan (H)	3	2	1	0	22	2	+20	7	Semi-finals
2	China	3	2	1	0	16	3	+13	7	Semi-finals
3	Bangladesh	3	1	0	2	2	18	−16	3	5–6th place classification
4	Chinese Taipei	3	0	0	3	1	18	−17	0	7–8th place classification

Source: FIH
Rules for classification: 1) points; 2) matches won; 3) goal difference; 4) goals for; 5) head-to-head result; 6) field goals scored.
(H) Hosts

All times are local (UTC+9).

29 May 2026
17:00

China	8–1	Chinese Taipei
X. Wang 6'; Feng 27', 34', 53', 55'; Guo 38'; Li 40'; Lu 43'	Report	Huang 7'

Umpires:
Kim Jiyong (KOR)
Neetu Kumari (IND)

Player of the match – (China) Feng Jiaxin

30 May 2026
17:00

Japan	12–0	Bangladesh
Koike 4', 51'; Fujii 5', 23'; Morikawa 6'; Yamamoto 7', 39'; Kuwamoto 14', 42', 42'; Hashimoto 20'; Horie 44'	Report

Umpires:
Hazatul Abd Razak (MAS)
Nadiah Ong (SGP)

Player of the match – (Japan) Nene Fujii

31 May 2026
19:00

Japan	2–2	China
Yamamoto 18'; Sekiguchi 45'	Report	Guo 12'; Feng 50'

Umpires:
Kim Jeong Yong (KOR)
Rajendra Singh (IND)

Player of the match – (Japan) Yuno Sekiguchi

1 June 2026
15:00

Chinese Taipei	0–2	Bangladesh
	Report	Akter 29'; Riya 55'

Umpires:
Muhammad Rosli (MAS)
Neetu Kumari (IND)

Player of the match – (Bangladesh) Mst Khatun

3 June 2026
11:00

China	6–0	Bangladesh
Zhang 8'; Feng 24'; Lu 38'; Guo 48', 59'; Yu 53'	Report

Umpires:
Nadiah Ong (SGP)
Kim Jeong Yong (KOR)

Player of the match – (China) Guo Jiaxin

3 June 2026
13:00

Chinese Taipei	0–8	Japan
	Report	Yoshida 1'; Koike 8', 32', 38'; Kuwamoto 11', 57'; Fujii 22'; Togawa 36'

Umpires:
Neetu Kumari (IND)
Rajendra Singh (IND)

Player of the match – (Japan) Sayo Koike

== Classification round ==
=== Seventh place game ===
4 June 2026
10:00

Singapore	0–3	Chinese Taipei
	Report	Huang 31'; Chiang 35'; Chang 48'

Umpires:
Jannatul Ferdous (BAN)
Muhammad Rosli (MAS)

Player of the match – (Chinese Taipei) Chang Chih-Hsien

=== Fifth place game ===
4 June 2026
12:00

Malaysia	4–0	Bangladesh
Shamsudin 36', 38'; Mazlan 52'; Azli 55'	Report

Umpires:
Saya Kato (JPN)
Daulet Urmanov (KAZ)

Player of the match – (Malaysia) Nurfitrah Shamsudin

== Medal round ==
Semi-finals
5 June
India	2 (1)
China (p.s.o)	2 (3)
5 June
Japan	1
South Korea	0

Final
6 June
China	2
Japan	1
Third place
6 June
India	3
South Korea	0

=== Semi-finals ===
5 June 2026
13:00

India	2–2	China
Naz 3'; Ekka 54'	Report	Li 24'; Zhang 48'
Penalties
Naz (penalty shoot-out missed); Minz (penalty shoot-out missed); Kumari (penalty shoot-out scored); Ekka (penalty shoot-out missed)	1–3	(penalty shoot-out scored) Lu; (penalty shoot-out scored) Ge; (penalty shoot-out scored) Guo

Umpires:
Kim Jeong Yong (KOR)
Hazatul Abd Razak (MAS)

Player of the match – (China) Xue Liu

5 June 2026
15:00

Japan	1–0	South Korea
Sekiguchi 31'	Report

Umpires:
Xiaoxu Xu (CHN)
Salim Lucky (BAN)

Player of the match – (Japan) Mio Noda

=== Bronze medal match ===
6 June 2026
13:00

India	3–0	South Korea
Sa. Kumari 2'; Kujur 16'; Naz 33'	Report

Umpires:
Xiaoxu Xu (CHN)
Hazatul Abd Razak (MAS)

Player of the match – (India) Sandeepa Kumari

=== Gold medal match ===
6 June 2026
17:00

China	2–1	Japan
Feng 3'; Lu 10'	Report	Yamamoto 37'

Umpires:
Rinky See (HKG)
Kim Jeong Yong (KOR)

Player of the match – (China) Feng Jiaxin

== Winners ==
2026 Women's Hockey U18 Asia Cup
(China)
China
2nd title

== Awards ==
The following awards were given at the conclusion of the tournament:

Top scorer	Best player	Promising player	Best goalkeeper
(India) Nousheen Naz	(China) Guo Jiaxin	(Japan) Rina Yamamoto	(South Korea) Hong Seoyeon

== Statistics ==
=== Final standings ===
Pos	Grp	Team	Pld	W	D	L	GF	GA	GD	Pts	
1st place, gold medalist(s)	B	China	5	3	2	0	20	6	+14	11	Champions
2nd place, silver medalist(s)	B	Japan	5	3	1	1	24	4	+20	10	Runners up
3rd place, bronze medalist(s)	A	India	5	4	1	0	35	4	+31	13	3rd
4	A	South Korea	5	2	0	3	10	7	+3	6	4th
5	A	Malaysia	4	2	0	2	18	3	+15	6	Eliminated in group stage
6	B	Bangladesh	4	1	0	3	2	22	−20	3	Eliminated in group stage
7	A	Chinese Taipei	4	1	0	3	4	18	−14	3	Eliminated in group stage
8	A	Singapore	4	0	0	4	0	49	−49	0	Eliminated in group stage

Source: FIH

=== Goalscorers ===
There were 113 goals scored in 18 matches, for an average of 6.28 goals per match.

12 goals

- (India) Nousheen Naz

7 goals

- (China) Feng Jiaxin

5 goals

- (Japan) Sayo Koike
- (India) Sweety Kujur
- (Japan) Mai Kuwamoto
- (South Korea) Kwon Hayeon
- (India) Geethasri Nammi
- (Malaysia) Nurfitrah Shamsudin

4 goals

- (Malaysia) Nur Azli
- (China) Guo Jiaxin
- (Japan) Rina Yamamoto

3 goals

- (Japan) Nene Fujii
- (China) Lu TongTong
- (Malaysia) Nur Mazlan
- (India) Priyanka Minz
- (Malaysia) Nur Mohd

2 goals

- (India) Kiran Ekka
- (Chinese Taipei) Huang Yu-Si
- (South Korea) Kim Minchae
- (India) Sandeepa Kumari
- (India) Shruti Kumari
- (China) Li ZeYan
- (South Korea) Ryu Gyeongmin
- (Japan) Yuno Sekiguchi
- (China) Yuzheng Zhang

1 goal

- (Bangladesh) Kona Akter
- (Chinese Taipei) Chang Chih-Hsien
- (Chinese Taipei) Chiang Xin-Pei
- (India) Diya
- (Japan) Nana Hashimoto
- (Malaysia) Aqhinatul Hashmi
- (Japan) Miyabi Horie
- (Malaysia) Khaleesya Khairul
- (South Korea) Kim Jiwon
- (India) Pushpa Manjhi
- (Malaysia) Nur Misra
- (Japan) Hana Morikawa
- (India) Rashmeen Kaur
- (Bangladesh) Airin Riya
- (India) Nancy Saroha
- (Japan) Yuzuki Togawa
- (China) Wang Xinling
- (Japan) Kurumi Yoshida
- (China) Yu Wanxin

Source: FIH

== See also ==
- 2026 Women's Hockey Junior Asia Cup
