= International Hockey Federation =

International sports governing body organizing field hockey

- Fédération Internationale de Hockey
- Abbreviation: FIH
- Formation: 7 January 1924; 102 years ago
- Founded at: Paris, France
- Type: Sports federation
- Legal status: Governing body of: Field hockey Indoor hockey Hockey5s; Para hockey Beach hockey
- Purpose: Sport governance
- Headquarters: Lausanne, Switzerland
- Region served: Worldwide
- Members: 140 national associations
- Official language: English, French
- President: Tayyab Ikram
- CEO: Thierry Weil
- Main organ: Congress
- Affiliations: International Olympic Committee
- Website: www.fih.hockey

The International Hockey Federation, commonly known by the acronym FIH, is the international governing body of field hockey and indoor field hockey. Its headquarters are in Lausanne, Switzerland. FIH is responsible for field hockey's major international tournaments, notably the Hockey World Cup.

== History ==
FIH was founded on 7 January 1924 in Paris by Paul Léautey, who became the first president, in response to field hockey's omission from the programme of the 1924 Summer Olympics. First members complete to join the seven founding members were Austria, Belgium, Czechoslovakia, France, Hungary, Spain, and Switzerland.

In 1982, the FIH merged with the International Federation of Women's Hockey Associations (IFWHA), which had been founded in 1927 by Australia, Denmark, England, Ireland, Scotland, South Africa, the United States, and Wales.

The organisation has been based in Lausanne, Switzerland since 2005, having moved from Brussels, Belgium.

In response to the 2022 Russian invasion of Ukraine, the FIH banned Russia from the 2022 Women's FIH Hockey Junior World Cup, and banned Russian and Belarusian officials from FIH events.

== Structure ==
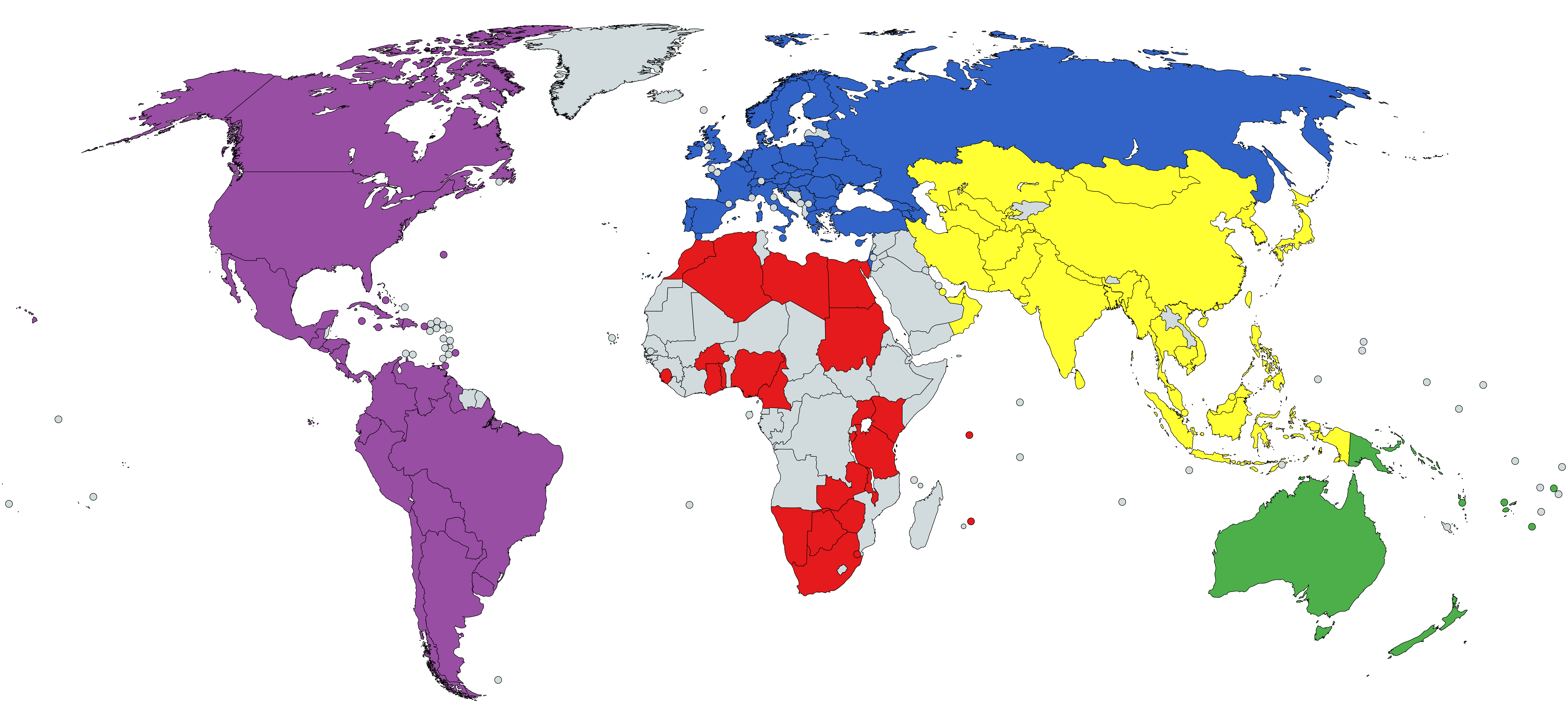
Map of the World with the five confederations.

In total, there are 140 member associations within the five confederations recognised by FIH. This includes Great Britain which is recognised as an adherent member of FIH, the team was represented at the Olympics and the Champions Trophy. England, Scotland and Wales are also represented by separate teams in FIH sanctioned tournaments.

AfHF – African Hockey Federation
AHF – Asian Hockey Federation
EHF – European Hockey Federation
OHF – Oceania Hockey Federation
PAHF – Pan American Hockey Federation

The FIH World Rankings was updated once after the major tournament finished, based on FIH sanction tournaments.

== Presidents ==
The following is a list of presidents of FIH:

Presidents of FIH
No.	Name	Country	Took office	Left office	Note
1	Paul Léautey	France	1924	1926	
2	Frantz Reichel	France	1926	1932	
3	Marc Bellin du Côteau	France	1932	1936	
4	Georg Evers	Germany	1936	1945	
—	Robert Liégeois	Belgium	1945	1946	Acting
5	Jaap Quarles van Ufford	Netherlands	1946	1966	
6	Rene Frank	Belgium	1966	1983	
7	Étienne Glichitch	France	1983	1996	
8	Juan Calzado	Spain	1996	2001	
9	Els van Breda Vriesman	Netherlands	2001	2008	
10	Leandro Negre	Spain	2008	2016	
11	Narinder Batra	India	2016	2022	
—	Seif El Dine Ahmed	Egypt	2022	2022	Acting
12	Tayyab Ikram	Macau	2022	Incumbent	

== FIH Awards ==
The FIH Awards have been given annually since 1998 for men and women, while the young category was added in 2001 to honour the best performances for junior players. FIH has twelve Honorary awards given to people who have made outstanding contributions to field hockey.

== Tournaments ==
=== Major ===
Format	Hockey	Indoor Hockey	Hockey5s
Men	Olympic Games	Indoor Hockey World Cup	Hockey5s World Cup
Men	World Cup	Indoor Hockey World Cup	Hockey5s World Cup
Men	Pro League	Indoor Hockey World Cup	Hockey5s World Cup
Men	Nations Cup	Indoor Hockey World Cup	Hockey5s World Cup
Men	Nations Cup 2	Indoor Hockey World Cup	Hockey5s World Cup
Women	Olympic Games	Indoor Hockey World Cup	Hockey5s World Cup
Women	World Cup	Indoor Hockey World Cup	Hockey5s World Cup
Women	Pro League	Indoor Hockey World Cup	Hockey5s World Cup
Women	Nations Cup	Indoor Hockey World Cup	Hockey5s World Cup
Women	Nations Cup 2	Indoor Hockey World Cup	Hockey5s World Cup
Youth Men	Junior World Cup		Youth Olympic Games
Youth Men	Junior World Cup		Youth World Cup
Youth Women	Junior World Cup		Youth Olympic Games
Youth Women	Junior World Cup		Youth World Cup

=== Other ===
- Masters Hockey World Cup
- Grand Master Hockey World Cup
- International Children's Games
- FIH Para Hockey World Cup

== Current winners ==
Competition	Current	Champions	Details	Runners-up	Next
Men's
Olympic Games	2024 (qual.)	Netherlands	Final	Germany	2028 (qual.)
World Cup	2026	Germany	Final	Spain	2030
Pro League	2025–26	Belgium	RR	England	2026–27
Nations Cup	2025–26	France	Final	South Africa	2026–27
Nations Cup 2	2024–25	Scotland	Final	Egypt	2026–27
Junior World Cup (U-21)	2025	Germany	Final	Spain	2027
Indoor World Cup	2025	Germany	Final	Austria	TBA
Hockey5s World Cup	2024	Netherlands	Final	Malaysia	TBA
Youth Olympic Games (U-18)	2018	Malaysia	Final	India	2026
Men's FIH Youth Hockey5s World Cup	2026				
Women's
Olympic Games	2024 (qual.)	Netherlands	Final	China	2028 (qual.)
World Cup	2026	Argentina	Final	Netherlands	2030
Pro League	2025–26	Netherlands	RR	Argentina	2026–27
Nations Cup	2025–26	India	Final	New Zealand	2026–27
Nations Cup 2	2024–25	France	Final	Uruguay	2026–27
Junior World Cup (U-21)	2025	Netherlands	Final	Argentina	2027
Indoor Hockey World Cup	2025	Poland	Final	Austria	2027
Hockey5s World Cup	2024	Netherlands	Final	India	TBA
Youth Olympic Games (U-18)	2018	Argentina	Final	India	2026
Women's FIH Youth Hockey5s World Cup	2026				

== Partners ==
The following are the partners of the International Hockey Federation:

- Hero MotoCorp

== See also ==
- FIH World Rankings
- Hockey Rules Board
- History of field hockey
