= 2026 U18 Hockey5s Youth Africa Cup =

Field hockey tournament

Tournament details
- Host country: Kenya
- City: Nairobi
- Dates: 6–8 August 2026
- Venue: Sikh Union Club

Final positions
- Champions: M: Kenya; W: South Africa

The hockey5s in 1st U18 Hockey5s Youth Africa Cup in Nairobi, Kenya was held at the Sikh Union Club from 6 to 8 August 2026. The tournament served as a direct qualifier for the 2026 men's and women's Youth Hockey5s World Cups, with the winner and runner-up qualifying.

Kenya won the boys' tournament and South Africa won the girls' tournament.

== Boys' ==
2026 Boys' U18 Hockey5s Youth Africa Cup
- Teams: 4 (from 1 confederation)

Final positions
- Champions: Kenya (1st title)
- Runner-up: South Africa
- Third place: Nigeria

Tournament statistics
- Matches played: 8
- Goals scored: 121 (15.13 per match)
- Top scorer: (Kenya) Kelvine Onyango (12 goals)

=== Team ===
- Kenya
- Nigeria
- South Africa
- Uganda

=== Results ===
All match times are local (UTC+3).

Pos	Team	Pld	W	D	L	GF	GA	GD	Pts	Qualification
1	Kenya (H)	3	3	0	0	35	14	+21	9	Final
2	South Africa	3	1	1	1	24	20	+4	4	Final
3	Nigeria	3	1	1	1	20	22	−2	4	3rd place match
4	Uganda	3	0	0	3	14	37	−23	0	3rd place match

Source: FIH
Rules for classification: 1) points; 2) matches won; 3) goal difference; 4) goals for; 5) head-to-head result; 6) field goals for.
(H) Hosts

6 August 2026
10:45

Kenya	8–5	South Africa
Onyango 6', 9', 24'; Korir 12', 23'; Meshach 15', 24'; Omondi 20'	Report	Carolus 5'; Stipcevich 7'; Pongwana 20'; Candy 26', 30'

Umpires:
Enouch Ola (NGR)
Siyabonga Martins (NAM)

6 August 2026
12:15

Nigeria	8–5	Uganda
Ali 5', 26'; Hale 8', 14', 30+'; Auwai 12', 18'; Olaitan 24'	Report	Rwothomio 2', 17', 30'; Yusuf 12'; Wanjala 28'

Umpires:
Siyabonga Martins (NAM)
Austin Mutua (KEN)

6 August 2026
14:30

South Africa	12–5	Uganda
Le Roux 3', 11', 17', 17', 25'; Carolus 4'; Stipcevich 7', 14', 20', 21'; McLean 10'; Candy 26'	Report	Masayi 10'; Rwothomio 23', 25'; Kabanda 29', 30'

Umpires:
Austin Mutua (KEN)
Enouch Ola (NGR)

6 August 2026
15:15

Nigeria	5–10	Kenya
Ali 12'; Auwai 20', 27', 27'; Emmanuel 30'	Report	Fedha 2', 17', 24'; Awot 10'; Onyango 11', 27'; Omondi 14', 16'; Wachira 18', 22'

Umpires:
Michael Dettmer (RSA)
Emmanuel Baguma (UGA)

7 August 2026
11:30

Kenya	17–4	Uganda
Onyango 1', 25', 28'; Fedha 3'; Korir 8', 13', 16'; Awot 17', 25', 27'; Omondi 19', 23', 24'; Meshach 24', 29', 30'; Lusweti 25'	Report	Rwothomio 4', 5'; Yusuf 27'; Masayi 27'

Umpires:
Siyabonga Martins (NAM)
Micheal Dettmer (RSA)

7 August 2026
12:15

South Africa	7–7	Nigeria
Stipcevich 10', 20', 22', 29'; Pongwana 15', 26'; Le Roux 23'	Report	Abba 10', 21', 26'; Olaitan 11', 17'; Emmanuel 12'; Auwai 18'

Umpires:
Austin Mutua (KEN)
Nortey Ebenezer (GHA)

=== Third place game ===
8 August 2026
11:30

Nigeria	15–2	Uganda
Olaitan 6', 6', 8', 14', 19', 20', 22', 30'; Emmanuel 9', 25'; Ali 13', 23'; Shaudad 17'; Hale 26'; Auwai 27'	Report	Kabanda 11', 28'

Umpires:
Austin Mutua (KEN)
Micheal Dettmer (RSA)

=== Final ===
8 August 2026
12:15

Kenya	6–5	South Africa
Onyango 1', 4', 18', 19'; Meshach 10'; Korir 21'	Report	Candy 5'; McLean 8'; Pongwana 13'; Carolus 15'; Le Roux 17'

Umpires:
Siyabonga Martins (NAM)
Nortey Ebenezer (GHA)

=== Final standings ===
Pos	Team	Status
1st place, gold medalist(s)	Kenya (H)	Qualified to the U18 Youth Hockey5's World Cup
2nd place, silver medalist(s)	South Africa	Qualified to the U18 Youth Hockey5's World Cup
3rd place, bronze medalist(s)	Nigeria	
4	Uganda	

Source: FIH
(H) Host

=== Goalscorers ===
There were 121 goals scored in 8 matches, for an average of 15.1 goals per match.

12 goals

- (Kenya) Kelvine Onyango

10 goals

- (Nigeria) Razaq Olaitan

9 goals

- (South Africa) Milan Stipcevich

8 goals

- (Nigeria) Umar Auwai

7 goals

- (South Africa) Keegan Le Roux
- (Uganda) Fredrick Rwothomio

6 goals

- (Kenya) Caleb Korir
- (Kenya) Reagan Meshach
- (Kenya) Daniel Omondi
- (Nigeria) Stephen Ali

4 goals

- (Kenya) Peter Awot
- (Kenya) Godfrey Fedha
- (Nigeria) John Emmanuel
- (South Africa) Blaine Candy
- (South Africa) Ndyebo Pongwana
- (Uganda) Emmanuel Kabanda

3 goals

- (Nigeria) Enouch Abba
- (Nigeria) Gabriel Hale
- (South Africa) Jay-Dee Carolus

2 goals

- (Kenya) Peter Wachira
- (South Africa) Zacharee McLean
- (Uganda) Allan Masayi
- (Uganda) Daki Yusuf

1 goal

- (Kenya) Kerry Lusweti
- (Nigeria) Abdulbasit Shaudad
- (Uganda) Isaac Wanjala

Source: FIH

== Girls' ==
2026 Girls' U18 Hockey5s Youth Africa Cup
- Teams: 5 (from 1 confederation)

Final positions
- Champions: South Africa (1st title)
- Runner-up: Kenya
- Third place: Nigeria

Tournament statistics
- Matches played: 12
- Goals scored: 132 (11 per match)
- Top scorer: (Nigeria) Ifeoluwa Olaitan (14 goals)

=== Team ===
- Ghana
- Kenya
- Nigeria
- South Africa
- Uganda

=== Results ===
All match times are local (UTC+3).

Pos	Team	Pld	W	D	L	GF	GA	GD	Pts	Qualification
1	South Africa	4	3	0	1	38	10	+28	9	Final
2	Kenya (H)	4	3	0	1	30	13	+17	9	Final
3	Nigeria	4	3	0	1	24	17	+7	9	3rd place match
4	Ghana	4	1	0	3	13	28	−15	3	3rd place match
5	Uganda	4	0	0	4	3	40	−37	0	

Source: FIH
Rules for classification: 1) points; 2) matches won; 3) goal difference; 4) goals for; 5) head-to-head result; 6) field goals for.
(H) Hosts

6 August 2026
11:30

Nigeria	7–4	South Africa
Akeen 7'; Isihaq 8'; Ambe 14'; Olaitan 17', 21', 27'; Musa 20'	Report	Van der Byl 17'; Jonker 19', 29'; Choene 25'

Umpires:
Tumi Sibanda (ZIM)
Rooney Aheebwe (UGA)

6 August 2026
13:00

Ghana	9–2	Uganda
Amoako 7', 9', 11', 12', 13', 18', 21', 26'; Elliasu 30'	Report	Lamala 15'; Atimango 24'

Umpires:
Charity Onosimuan (NGR)
Elizabeth Okama (KEN)

6 August 2026
13:45

Kenya	3–5	South Africa
Mogeni 9'; Imisa 11'; Khatikoli 19'	Report	Bestbier 8'; Volschenk 13', 15', 29'; Peterson 27'

Umpires:
Tumi Sibanda (ZIM)
Nortey Ebenezer (GHA)

6 August 2026
16:00

Kenya	7–0	Uganda
Imisa 5', 14'; Grener 16', 17', 25', 29'; Mcrae 19'	Report

Umpires:
Tiffany Cowie (RSA)
Nortey Ebenezer (GHA)

7 August 2026
10:00

South Africa	19–0	Uganda
Choene 1', 5', 10', 13'; Jonker 3', 9', 21'; Volschenk 4', 9', 29'; Bestbier 6', 11'; Van der Byl 7', 23'; Petersen 14', 17', 19'; Ferreira 22', 24'	Report

Umpires:
Charity Onosimuan (NGR)
Tumi Sibanda (ZIM)

7 August 2026
10:45

Nigeria	6–2	Ghana
Olaitan 6', 20'; Thomas 11', 12'; Ominyi 14'; Musa 21'	Report	Sango 7'; Annia 8'

Umpires:
Tiffany Cowie (RSA)
Rooney Aheebwe (UGA)

7 August 2026
13:00

Kenya	10–2	Ghana
Helida 7', 24'; Imisa 12', 15', 21'; Grener 18', 19', 27'; Kadogo 28', 29'	Report	Amoako 2', 28'

Umpires:
Emmanuel Baguma (UGA)
Enouch Ola (NGR)

7 August 2026
13:45

Uganda	1–5	Nigeria
Atimango 15'	Report	Thomas 9', 24'; Akeen 14'; Olaitan 15+', 29'

Umpires:
Tiffany Cowie (RSA)
Elizabeth Okama (KEN)

8 August 2026
10:00

Ghana	0–10	South Africa
	Report	Jonker 1', 3', 5'; Bestbier 5', 23'; Peterson 8', 26'; Ferreira 9'; Volschenk 12' van der Byl 30'

Umpires:
Elizabeth Okama (KEN)
Charity Onosimuan (NGR)

8 August 2026
10:45

Nigeria	6–10	Kenya
Olaitan 7', 11', 12', 13'; Akeen 16'; Isihaq 21'	Report	Grener 2', 3'; Kadogo 5', 17', 24'; McRae 10'; Imisa 13', 13', 15', 29'

Umpires:
Tumi Sibanda (ZIM)
Siyabonga Martins (NAM)

=== Third place game ===
8 August 2026
13:00

Nigeria	4–3	Ghana
Olaitan 1', 4', 20'; Musa 25'	Report	Amoako 13', 30+'; Hamidu 23'

Umpires:
Tiffany Cowie (RSA)
Elizabeth Okama (KEN)

=== Final ===
8 August 2026
13:45

South Africa	11–6	Kenya
Volschenk 3', 4', 7'; Choene 3'; Jonker 5', 10', 13', 27'; Bestbier 6'; Petersen 7'; Van der Byl 24'	Report	Mogeni 5'; Awino 13'; Kadogo 16', 30'; Imisa 22', 23'

Umpires:
Tumi Sibanda (ZIM)
Enoch Ola (NGR)

=== Final standings ===
Pos	Team	Status
1st place, gold medalist(s)	South Africa	Qualified to the U18 Youth Hockey5's World Cup
2nd place, silver medalist(s)	Kenya (H)	Qualified to the U18 Youth Hockey5's World Cup
3rd place, bronze medalist(s)	Nigeria	
4	Ghana	
5	Uganda	

Source: FIH
(H) Host

=== Goalscorers ===
There were 132 goals scored in 12 matches, for an average of 11 goals per match.

14 goals

- (Nigeria) Ifeoluwa Olaitan

12 goals

- (Ghana) Eva Amoako
- (Kenya) Valary Imisa
- (South Africa) Martina Jonker

10 goals

- (South Africa) Claire Volschenk

9 goals

- (Kenya) Audrie Grener

7 goals

- (Nigeria) Laura Kadogo
- (South Africa) Azania Peterson

6 goals

- (South Africa) Codie Bestbier
- (South Africa) Xylia Choene

5 goals

- (South Africa) Addison van der Byl

4 goals

- (Nigeria) Rebeccah Thomas

3 goals

- (Nigeria) Zainab Akeen
- (Nigeria) Basira Musa
- (South Africa) Jemma Ferreira

2 goals

- (Kenya) Shanel Helida
- (Kenya) Marina McRae
- (Kenya) Virginia Mogeni
- (Nigeria) Alimah Isihaq
- (Uganda) Mercy Atimango

1 goal

- (Ghana) Esther Annia
- (Ghana) Rakia Elliasu
- (Ghana) Zenabu Hamidu
- (Ghana) Charlotte Sango
- (Nigeria) Pesu Ambe
- (Nigeria) Janet Ominyi
- (Kenya) Mishel Awino
- (Kenya) Mitchell Khatikoli
- (Uganda) Phionah Lamala

Source: FIH
