= 2026 Women's U18 Hockey5's Asia Cup =

Asian field hockey tournament

Tournament details
- Host country: Oman
- City: Muscat
- Dates: 20–25 July
- Teams: 7 (from 1 confederation)
- Venue: Hockey Oman

Final positions
- Champions: China (1st title)
- Runner-up: India
- Third place: Kazakhstan

Tournament statistics
- Matches played: 24
- Goals scored: 198 (8.25 per match)
- Top scorer: (India) Nousheen Naz (17 goals)
- Best player: (China) Lu Tongtong
- Best young player: (Kazakhstan) Yerkezhan Suleiman
- Best goalkeeper: (China) Xue Liu

The 2026 Women's U18 Hockey5's Asia Cup was the first edition of the Women's U18 Hockey5's Asia Cup. A total of seven Asian national teams contested, organized by the Asian Hockey Federation. The tournament was held in Muscat, Oman from 20 to 25 July 2026. The tournament also served as an Asian qualifier for the inaugural 2026 Youth Hockey5's World Cup. China won the title by beating India in the final.

== Venue ==
(Oman) Muscat
Hockey Oman Stadium
Capacity: 5,500

== Teams ==
China

Head Coach: (China) Guo Jie

1. Liu Xue(GK)
5. Wang Tianhui
8. Liu Zixin
11. Guo Jiaxin(C)
13. Ge Chen
16. Lu Tongtong
21. Sun Hongyan
25. Tang Kexin
28. Zhang Yuzheng
31. Yu Wanting(GK)
India

Head Coach: (India) Rani Rampal

1. Mahak Parihar(GK)
4. Pushpa Manjhi
5. Nousheen Naz
9. Diya
15. Sandeepa Kumari
16. Nilam Topno
20. Khili Kumari(GK)
25. Sweety Kujur(C)
27. Kiran Ekka
63. Shruti Kumari
Iran

Head Coach: (Iran) Esfandyar Safaei

1. setayesh khodakarami(GK)
2. maedeh rezakhani
3. yeganeh najafinasab
7. setayesh zarebidoki
8. zeynab maleki
9. zahra abdi
10. shaina sheibani
11. fatemeh dashab(C)
12. setareh abedinifar
15. sarina kalhori(GK)
Kazakhstan

Head Coach: (Kazakhstan) Daulet Urmanov

3. Dilnaz Nigmetzhanova
5. Akpeiil Kaiyrzhan(GK)
6. Yerkezhan Suleimen(C)
9. Dariya Kozhakhmetova
10. Zhansaya Amangeldi
12. Ayanat Mazhim
22. Yasmin Seiitzhan
23. Gaukhar Aslankyzy
25. Aruzhan Bolatbek
32. Ayaulym Rakhym(GK)
Oman

Head Coach: (Oman) Olaa Al Balushi

4. Yumna Al Farsi
5. Meqat Al Zadjali
7. Mulook Al Ghaithi
10. Mayadah Al Zadjali
11. Logain Al Shirawi(C)
15. Ayah Al Amri
16. Fatima Al Amri
22. Retal Al Hinai
25. Maryam Al Mandhari(C)
26. Ranim Al Farsi(GK)
Pakistan

Head Coach: (Pakistan) Arshad Sahrish

2. Khalid Sana
3. Raheem Javeria(C)
4. Zehra Iffat
7. Haider Farwa
10. Fatima Shereen
13. Kanwal Sehrish(GK)
14. Aslam Areeba
16. Afzal Sobia
17. Batool Anaya
Uzbekistan

Head Coach: (Uzbekistan) Gavhar Saidmuradova

10. Dilyara Khaldibaeva
11. Mohigul Kuzieva(C)
13. Janon Ilhomova
14. Roziyakhon Soyibjonova
15. Noilakhon Olimova
21. Aziza Akhmedova(GK)

Source:FIH

== Challenger group ==
| Pos | Team | Pld | W | D | L | GF | GA | GD | Pts | Qualification |
|---|---|---|---|---|---|---|---|---|---|---|
| 1 | Iran | 4 | 3 | 0 | 1 | 23 | 6 | +17 | 9 | Knockout stage |
| 2 | Pakistan | 4 | 3 | 0 | 1 | 18 | 7 | +11 | 9 | Classification round |
| 3 | Oman | 4 | 0 | 0 | 4 | 1 | 29 | −28 | 0 | Classification round |

Source: FIH
Rules for classification: 1) points; 2) matches won; 3) goal difference; 4) goals for; 5) head-to-head result; 6) field goals for.

All times are local (UTC+4).

20 July 2026
19:30

| Oman | 0–6 | Pakistan |
|---|---|---|
| | Report | Sobia 1', 5', 20+'; Javeria 12'; Farwa 14', 16' |

Umpires:
Mohammad Bagherpour (IRI)
Mahsa Ghandriz (IRI)

21 July 2026
18:00

| Iran | 11–0 | Oman |
|---|---|---|
| sheibani 2', 3' abdi 4' zarebidoki 7', 17', 18' abedinifar 10', 13', 16', 17' dashab 15' | Report |

Umpires:
Ammar Rana (CAM)
Ahmed Abbas Ilebee (IRQ)

21 July 2026
20:00

| Pakistan | 1–4 | Iran |
|---|---|---|
| Sobia 6' | Report | abdi 2' zarebidoki 4', 14', 15' |

Umpires:
Amna Al Jahhafi (OMA)
Nawar Al-Jabri (OMA)

23 July 2026
19:30

| Pakistan | 6–1 | Oman |
|---|---|---|
| Afzal 7', 8', 11', 12', 15'; Shareen 14' | Report | Al Amri 13' |

Umpires:
Mohammad Bagherpour (IRI)
Ahmed Abbas Ilebee (IRQ)

23 July 2026
22:00

| Iran | 2–5 | Pakistan |
|---|---|---|
| rezakhani 8', 20' | Report | Shareen 1', 3', 12'; Farwa 4'; Javeria 20' |

Umpires:
Ammar Rana (CAM)
Ahmed Abbas Ilebee (IRQ)

24 July 2026
17:30

| Oman | 0–6 | Iran |
|---|---|---|
| | Report | dashab 5' rezakhani 13' abedinifar 16', 16' maleki 18' zarebidoki 20' |

Umpires:
Ahmed Abbas Ilebee (IRQ)
Deekshith Narayana (IND)

== Elite group ==
| Pos | Team | Pld | W | D | L | GF | GA | GD | Pts | Qualification |
|---|---|---|---|---|---|---|---|---|---|---|
| 1 | China | 6 | 5 | 1 | 0 | 38 | 8 | +30 | 16 | Knockout stage |
| 2 | India | 6 | 4 | 1 | 1 | 49 | 11 | +38 | 13 | Knockout stage |
| 3 | Kazakhstan | 6 | 2 | 0 | 4 | 16 | 28 | −12 | 6 | Knockout stage |
| 4 | Uzbekistan | 6 | 0 | 0 | 6 | 2 | 58 | −56 | 0 | Classification round |

Source: FIH
Rules for classification: 1) points; 2) matches won; 3) goal difference; 4) goals for; 5) head-to-head result; 6) field goals for.

All times are local (UTC+4).

20 July 2026
18:30

| India | 8–3 | Kazakhstan |
|---|---|---|
| Sa. Kumari 3', 12'; Naz 6', 9'; Topno 7'; Diya 14', 15', 20' | Report | Nigmetzhanova 17', 18'; Seiitzhan 20' |

Umpires:
Rahimah Abdul Aziz (SGP)
Nawar Al-Jabri (OMA)

20 July 2026
20:30

| China | 12–0 | Uzbekistan |
|---|---|---|
| Lu 2', 3', 12', 20', 20'; Tang 6', 16', 16'; Ge 13', 19'; Liu 15', 17' | Report |

Umpires:
Rahimah Abdul Aziz (SGP)
Ammar Rana (CAM)

20 July 2026
22:00

| Kazakhstan | 5–2 | Uzbekistan |
|---|---|---|
| Suleimen 4', 17'; Seiitzhan 5', 19'; Aslankyzy 9' | Report | Kuzieva 7'; Ilhomova 17' |

Umpires:
Bhagyashree Agarwal (IND)
Amna Al Jahhafi (OMA)

21 July 2026
19:00

| China | 2–2 | India |
|---|---|---|
| Ge 4'; Guo 19' | Report | Naz 16', 17' |

Umpires:
Hussain Al Hasani (OMA)
Mohammad Ali Khan (BAN)

21 July 2026
21:00

| India | 16–0 | Uzbekistan |
|---|---|---|
| Sa. Kumari 2', 6', 20'; Diya 3', 17'; Naz 6', 9', 15', 16'; Ekka 8'; Kujur 10', 13', 20'; Manjhi 11', 13'; Topno 18' | Report |

Umpires:
Nawar Al-Jabri (OMA)
Mahsa Ghandriz (IRI)

21 July 2026
22:00

| Kazakhstan | 1–5 | China |
|---|---|---|
| Suleimen 5' | Report | Lu 3', 14'; Guo 9', 13'; Ge 10' |

Umpires:
Bhagyashree Agarwal (IND)
Amna Al Jahhafi (OMA)

23 July 2026
18:30

| Kazakhstan | 0–10 | India |
|---|---|---|
| | Report | Naz 1', 1', 15', 20'; Sa. Kumari 11', 16', 18'; Ekka 15'; Topno 17'; Manjhi 19' |

Umpires:
Rahimah Abdul Aziz (SGP)
Amna Al Jahhafi (OMA)

23 July 2026
20:30

| Uzbekistan | 0–10 | China |
|---|---|---|
| | Report | Lu 3', 5', 7'; Guo 9'; Tang 9', 20'; Sun 11'; Zhang 15', 19'; Ge 17' |

Umpires:
Mohammad Ali Khan (BAN)
Mohammad Bagherpour (IRI)

23 July 2026
22:00

| Uzbekistan | 0–5 | Kazakhstan |
|---|---|---|
| | Report | Nigmetzhanova 1', 17'; Suleiman 11'; Aslankyzy 15'; Amangeldi 18' |

Umpires:
Deekshith Narayana (IND)
Mahsa Ghandriz (IRI)

24 July 2026
18:30

| India | 3–6 | China |
|---|---|---|
| Sa. Kumari 1'; Ekka 6', 18' | Report | Guo 2', 13', 20'; Ge 3'; Lu 10', 20' |

Umpires:
Rahimah Abdul Aziz (SGP)
Mohammad Ali Khan (BAN)

24 July 2026
20:30

| Uzbekistan | 0–10 | India |
|---|---|---|
| | Report | Sh. Kumari 1'; Ekka 3'; Naz 3', 7', 17'; Kujur 4'; Topno 6'; Sa. Kumari 7', 13'; Diya 12' |

Umpires:
Nawar Al-Jabri (OMA)
Mahsa Ghandriz (IRI)

24 July 2026
21:30

| China | 3–2 | Kazakhstan |
|---|---|---|
| Ge 7'; Sun 9'; Tang 12' | Report | Bolatbek 17'; Suleiman 18' |

Umpires:
Bhagyashree Agarwal (IND)
Amna Al Jahhafi (OMA)

== Classification round ==
24 July 2026
22:30

| Pakistan | 11–0 | Oman |
|---|---|---|
| Sobia 1', 5', 15'; Farwa 2', 12', 18'; Javeria 7', 13', 14', 19'; Areeba 8' | Report |

Umpires:
Rahimah Abdul Aziz (SGP)
Deekshith Narayana (IND)

=== Challenger Trophy ===
25 July 2026
19:20

| Uzbekistan | 6–1 | Pakistan |
|---|---|---|
| Olimova 3'; Soyibjonova 4'; Ilhomova 9', 14', 16'; Kuzieva 11' | Report | Sobia 2' |

Umpires:
Nawar Al-Jabri (OMA)
Amna Al Jahhafi (OMA)

== Knockout stage ==
=== Semi final 1 ===
25 July 2026
17:20

| China | 9–0 | Iran |
|---|---|---|
| Lu 3', 11', 12'; Tang 5', 6', 18'; Guo 9', 20'; Wang 17' | Report |

Umpires:
Ammar Rana (CAM)
Bhagyashree Agarwal (IND)

=== Semi final 2 ===
25 July 2026
18:00

| India | 8–1 | Kazakhstan |
|---|---|---|
| Sa. Kumari 5'; Manjhi 6', 8', 8'; Diya 13', 16'; Sh. Kumari 16'; Naz 20' | Report | Mazhim 10' |

Umpires:
Rahimah Abdul Aziz (SGP)
Amna Al Jahhafi (OMA)

=== Bronze medal match ===
25 July 2026
20:40

| Iran | 0–9 | Kazakhstan |
|---|---|---|
| | Report | Nigmetzhanova 1', 3', 20'; Aslankyzy 4'; Seiitzhan 5', 7', 10', 18'; Kozhakhmetova 8' |

Umpires:
Bhagyashree Agarwal (IND)
Rahimah Abdul Aziz (SGP)

=== Gold medal match ===
25 July 2026
22:00

| China | 4–2 | India |
|---|---|---|
| Lu 1'; Tang 5'; Guo 6'; Ge 19' | Report | Naz 13'; Manjhi 20' |

Umpires:
Hussain Al Hasani (OMA)
Mohammad Bagherpour (IRI)

== Winners ==
2026 Women's U18 Hockey5's Asia Cup
(China)
China
1st title

== Final standings ==
| Pos | Team | |
|---|---|---|
| 1st place, gold medalist(s) | China | Qualified to the U18 Youth Hockey5's World Cup |
| 2nd place, silver medalist(s) | India | Qualified to the U18 Youth Hockey5's World Cup |
| 3rd place, bronze medalist(s) | Kazakhstan | |
| 4 | Iran | |
| 5 | Uzbekistan | |
| 6 | Pakistan | |
| 7 | Oman | |

Source: FIH

== Goalscorers ==
There were 198 goals scored in 24 matches, for an average of 8.25 goals per match.

17 goals

- (India) Nousheen Naz

16 goals

- (China) Lu Tongtong

13 goals

- (Pakistan) Afzal Sobia

12 goals

- (India) Sandeepa Kumari

10 goals

- (China) Jiaxin Guo
- (China) Kexin Tang

8 goals

- (India) Diya
- (China) Chen Ge

7 goals

- (India) Pushpa Manjhi
- (Kazakhstan) Dilnaz Nigmetzhanova
- (Kazakhstan) Yasmin Seiitzhan
- (Iran) setayesh zarebidoki

6 goals

- (Iran) setareh abedinifar
- (Pakistan) Haider Farwa
- (Pakistan) Raheem Javeria

5 goals

- (India) Kiran Ekka
- (Kazakhstan) Yerkezhan Suleimen

4 goals

- (Uzbekistan) Janon Ilhomova
- (India) Sweety Kujur
- (Pakistan) Shareen
- (India) Nilam Topno

3 goals

- (Kazakhstan) Gaukhar Aslankyzy
- (Iran) maedeh rezakhani

2 goals

- (Iran) zahra abdi
- (Iran) fatemeh dashab
- (India) Shruti Kumari
- (Uzbekistan) Mohigul Kuzieva
- (China) Zixin Liu
- (Iran) shaina sheibani
- (China) Hongyan Sun
- (China) Yuzheng Zhang

1 goal

- (Oman) Ayah Al Amri
- (Kazakhstan) Zhansaya Amangeldi
- (Pakistan) Aslam Areeba
- (Kazakhstan) Aruzhan Bolatbek
- (Kazakhstan) Dariya Kozhakhmetova
- (Iran) zeynab maleki
- (Kazakhstan) Ayanat Mazhim
- (Uzbekistan) Noilakhon Olimova
- (Uzbekistan) Roziyakhon Soyibjonova
- (China) Tianhui Wang

Source: FIH

== See also ==
- 2026 Men's U18 Hockey5's Asia Cup
