= Field hockey at the 2028 Summer Olympics – Women's qualification =

The women's qualification for the Olympic field hockey tournament takes place between December 2025 and March 2028, allocating twelve teams for the final tournament. All five FIH (International Hockey Federation) zones are expected to have a continental representation in the Olympic field hockey event.

The host nation, the United States, received a direct quota place in the women's tournament after having attained the top twenty-five spot or higher in the FIH world ranking list.

== Method ==
Twelve teams will participate in the women's field hockey tournament, with each National Olympic Committee (NOC) sending a roster of sixteen players and three (including one goalkeeper) substitutes.

=== Host nation ===
As the host nation, the United States received a direct quota place in the women's tournament after having attained the top twenty-five spot or higher in the FIH world ranking list. If the American hockey players had won the 2027 Pan American Games, the number of places in two wildcard tournaments would have risen to five, with the remaining spot offered to the highest-ranked of the two bronze medal winners.

=== FIH Pro League ===
The winners of the Season 7 (2025–26 edition) and the Season 8 (2026–27 edition) secure a quota place for their respective NOC. Should the same team win both seasons, the runner-up of the Season 8 would take the spot.

=== Continental qualification ===
The winners from each of the five confederation zones (Africa, Americas, Asia, Europe, and Oceania) in their respective tournaments listed below secured a quota place for their respective NOC:

- Africa – 2027 African Olympic Qualifier
- Americas – 2027 Pan American Games
- Asia – 2026 Asian Games
- Europe – 2027 EuroHockey Championship
- Oceania – 2027 Oceania Cup

=== Qualification via the wild card tournament ===
The remaining third of the total quota was attributed to the eight-team field through each of the two separate FIH Olympic Qualifying Tournaments (OQTs), held in March 2028. The top two eligible NOCs at the end of each tournament secured the berths to complete the twelve-team field for Los Angeles 2028. If the host nation, the United States, had won the 2027 Pan American Games, a fifth spot would have been available in the OQTs to be eventually awarded to the highest-ranked of the two bronze medal winners at midnight on the final day of the second tournament.

The teams based on the continental quotas, determined by the number of NOCs from each continent within the top 24 of the FIH world ranking list, were eligible to participate in each of the two OQTs. From these quotas, eight nations already qualified for Los Angeles were removed from the list, leaving the remainder to be filled by the highest-ranked eligible NOCs in each of the continental meets.

=== Qualified teams ===
Qualification	Date	Host/Country	Berths	Qualified team
Host country	—N/a		1	United States
2025–26 FIH Pro League	9 December 2025 – 28 June 2026	Various	1	Netherlands
2026 Asian Games	18 September – 3 October 2026	Kakamigahara	1	India
2026–27 FIH Pro League	8 December 2026 – 27 June 2027	Various	1	
2027 Pan American Games	27 July – 6 August 2027	Lima	1	
2027 EuroHockey Championship	28 July – 8 August 2027	London	1	
2027 Oceania Cup	September 2027 (TBC)	New Zealand	1	
2027 African Olympic Qualifier	27 August - 10 September	(Egypt) Cairo	1	
2028 FIH Hockey Olympic Qualifiers	March 2028 (TBC)	TBC	2	
2028 FIH Hockey Olympic Qualifiers	March 2028 (TBC)	TBC	2	
Total			12	

== 2025–26 FIH Pro League ==
=== Final standings ===
Pos	Team	Pld	W	SOW	SOL	L	GF	GA	GD	Pts	Qualification or relegation
1st place, gold medalist(s)	Netherlands (Note: The Argentina versus Netherlands second match was cancelled and counted as win for Netherlands.) (C)	15	14	0	1	0	56	7	+49	46	Qualified for the 2028 Summer Olympics
2nd place, silver medalist(s)	Argentina	15	8	3	1	3	30	19	+11	31	
3rd place, bronze medalist(s)	Belgium	16	9	1	1	5	31	23	+8	30	
4	China	16	7	1	1	7	25	37	−12	24	
5	Germany	16	7	0	2	7	27	24	+3	23	
6	Spain	16	5	3	1	7	25	31	−6	22	
7	England	16	4	1	2	9	19	31	−12	16	
8	Australia	16	2	3	2	9	17	37	−20	14	
9	Ireland (R)	16	2	1	2	11	15	36	−21	10	Relegated to 2026–27 FIH Nations Cup

Source: FIH
Rules for classification: 1) points; 2) matches won; 3) goal difference; 4) goals for; 5) head-to-head result; 6) field goals scored.
(C) Champion; (R) Relegated

== 2026 Asian Games ==
=== Final standings ===
Pos	Team	Pld	W	D	L	GF	GA	GD	Pts	Qualification
Gold medal	India	7	7	0	0	69	3	+66	21	2028 Summer Olympics
Silver medal	China	7	5	1	1	46	1	+45	16	2028 FIH Hockey Olympic Qualifiers
Bronze medal	Japan (H)	7	4	2	1	23	4	+19	14	2028 FIH Hockey Olympic Qualifiers
4	South Korea	7	4	1	2	20	7	+13	13	2028 FIH Hockey Olympic Qualifiers
5	Malaysia	7	5	0	2	21	7	+14	15	2028 FIH Hockey Olympic Qualifiers
6	Thailand	7	3	0	4	8	30	−22	9	
7	Chinese Taipei	7	2	1	4	10	24	−14	7	
8	Indonesia	7	2	1	4	7	31	−24	7	
9	Bangladesh	6	0	2	4	7	31	−24	2	
10	Singapore	6	1	1	4	5	19	−14	4	
11	Kazakhstan	6	0	2	4	5	36	−31	2	
12	Uzbekistan	6	1	1	4	6	34	−28	4	

Source: FIH
(H) Hosts

== FIH Hockey Olympic Qualifiers ==
=== Qualified teams ===
Qualification	Date	Host	Berths	Qualified team
2026 Asian Games	18 September – 2 October 2026	Kakamigahara	3/4	China; Japan; Korea; Malaysia
2027 Pan American Games	27 July – 6 August 2027	Lima	2/3/4	
2027 EuroHockey Championship	28 July – 8 August 2027	London	8/9	
2027 Oceania Cup	September 2027	TBC	0/1	
Total			16	

== See also ==
- Field hockey at the 2028 Summer Olympics – Men's qualification
