= India women's national under-18 hockey5's team =

Under-18 hockey5's team that represents India

India hockey5s U18 girls
- Association: Hockey India
- Confederation: AHF (Asia)
- Head Coach: (India) Rani Rampal
- Captain: Sweety Kujur
- Top scorer: Mumtaz Khan (18)

First international
- India 14–0 Singapore (Bangkok, 25 April 2018)

Last international
- China 4–2 India (Muscat, 25 July 2026)

Biggest win
- Vanuatu 0–16 India (Buenos Aires, 9 October 2018); India 16–0 Uzbekistan (Muscat, 21 July 2026)

Youth Olympic Games
- Appearances: 1 (first in 2018)
- Best result: Runner-up (2018)

Youth Asia Cup
- Appearances: 1 (first in 2026)
- Best result: (silver) Runner-up (2026)
Medal record
Youth Olympics
Silver medal – second place	2018 Buenos Aires
Youth Asia Cup
Silver medal – second place	2026 Muscat

The India women's national under-18 hockey5's team represents India at international youth hockey5s tournaments, governed by Hockey India. India are the reigning Youth Olympic silver medallists and the Girls' Asia Cup silver medallists.

== History ==
India contested for the 2018 Youth Olympic spot, in the Asian qualifier held in Bangkok, which was conducted in the Hockey 5s format, a 5-a-side game that is played on a smaller field size. They finished as the runners-up and qualified for the first time to the Youth Olympics. In their first ever Olympics, India entered the final after overcoming Chinese in the semi-final, to whom they lost the qualifier title earlier. In the final clash against Argentina, India took early lead with the help of Mumtaz's goal, but Argentina put 3 goals to win the gold medal. It is the first hockey medal for India in Youth Olympics, along with the boys' team's silver in the same edition.

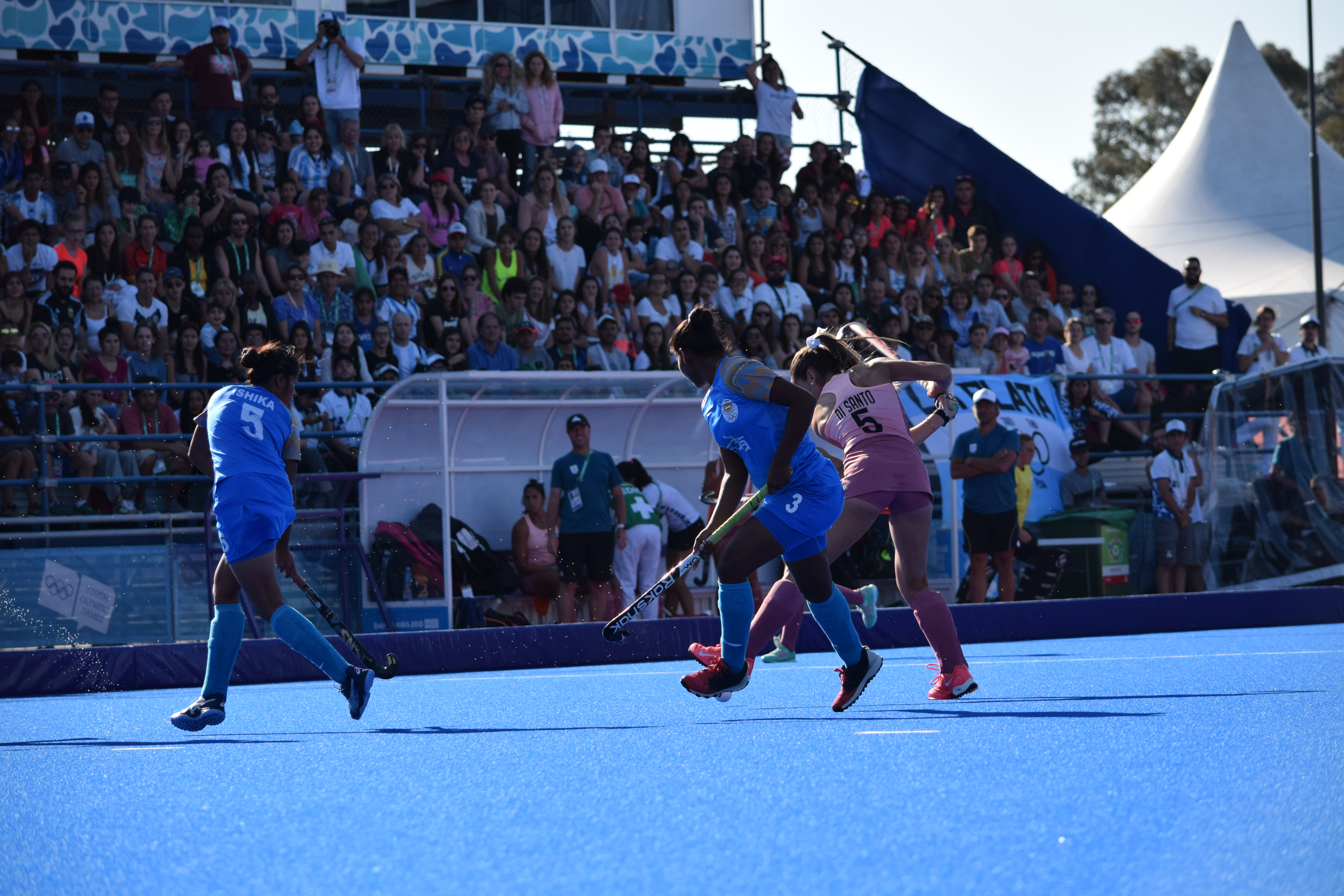
India in action against Argentina during the women's Hockey5s gold medal match at the 2018 Summer Youth Olympics.

India bagged silver in the inaugural 2026 Hockey5s Asia Cup, after defeated by China in the final, and qualified to the inaugural U18 World Cup.

=== U16 side ===
The qualification tournament for the 2014 Youth Olympics in hockey5s format took place in Bangkok in 2013. Indian U16 team did not participate and missed the Youth Olympics.

== Tournament record ==
=== Summer Youth Olympics ===
Summer Youth Olympics
Year	Host	Round	Position	Pld	W	D	L	GF	GA
2014	Nanjing, China	Did not participate							
2018	Buenos Aires, Argentina	Final	2nd place, silver medalist(s)	8	6	0	2	36	11
	Total		Runners-up	8	6	0	2	36	13

=== Summer Youth Olympics Qualifiers ===
Summer Youth Olympics Qualifiers
Year	Host	Position	Result	Pld	W	D	L	GF	GA
2013	Bangkok, Thailand	Did not participate							
2018	Bangkok, Thailand	2nd	Qualified for 2018 Youth Olympics	5	4	0	1	38	6
	Total		Runners-up	5	4	0	1	38	6

=== Youth Hockey5s World Cup ===
U18 Hockey5's World Cup
Year	Host	Round	Position	Pld	W	D	L	GF	GA
2026	Cairo, Egypt	Qualified							
	Total								

=== Youth Hockey5s Asia Cup ===
U18 Hockey5's Asia Cup
Year	Host	Round	Position	Pld	W	D	L	GF	GA
2026	Muscat, Oman	Final	2nd place, silver medalist(s)	8	5	1	2	59	16
	Total		Runners-up	8	5	1	2	59	16

== Honours ==
=== Major tournaments ===
- Youth Olympics:
  - (silver) Silver medal: 2018
- Youth Asia Cup:
  - (silver) Silver medal: 2026

== Current squad ==
The following Indian team named for the 2026 U18 Hockey5's Asia Cup, that was held at Muscat, from 20 to 25 July 2026

Head coach: (India) Rani Rampal

Players, caps and goals updated as of 25 July 2026.

No.	Pos.	Player	Date of birth (age)	Caps	Goals	Club
20	GK	Khili Kumari	23 November 2010 (age 15)	6		
1	GK	Mahak Parihar	30 October 2011 (age 15)	5		
27	DF	Kiran Ekka	5 September 2010 (age 16)	8	5	
16	DF	Nilam Topno	16 April 2011 (age 15)	8	4	
9	MF	Diya	13 October 2011 (age 15)	8	8	
4	MF	Pushpa Manjhi	1 May 2010 (age 16)	8	7	
63	MF	Shruti Kumari	1 January 2010 (age 16)	8	2	
5	FW	Nousheen Naz	13 July 2010 (age 16)	8	17	
15	FW	Sandeepa Kumari	18 March 2010 (age 16)	8	12	
25	FW	Sweety Kujur (Captain)	14 February 2010 (age 16)	8	4	

== Individual records ==
=== Top goal scorers ===
Position	Player	Goals	Caps
1	Mumtaz Khan	18	13
2	Nousheen Naz	17	8
3	Lalremsiami	16	13
4	Sangita Kumari	13	5
5	Sandeepa Kumari	12	8

=== Most goals for India at Youth Olympics ===
Position	Player	Goals
1	Mumtaz Khan	10
2	Lalremsiami	9
3	Reet	5
4	Salima Tete	4
5	Chetna	3
5	Baljeet Kaur	3

== Results and fixtures ==
The following is a list of match results in the last 12 months, as well as any future matches that have been scheduled.

Win Draw Loss Fixture

=== 2026 ===
All times are local (UTC+5:30).

20 July 2026 Hockey5s Asia Cup Elite	India	8–3	Kazakhstan	Muscat, Oman
18:30	Sa. Kumari 3', 12'; Naz 6', 9'; Topno 7'; Diya 14', 15', 20'	Report	Nigmetzhanova 17', 18'; Seiitzhan 20'	Stadium: Hockey Oman

21 July 2026 Hockey5s Asia Cup Elite	China	2–2	India	Muscat, Oman
19:00	Ge 4'; Guo 19'	Report	Naz 16', 17'	Stadium: Hockey Oman

21 July 2026 Hockey5s Asia Cup Elite	India	16–0	Uzbekistan	Muscat, Oman
21:00	Sa. Kumari 2', 6', 20'; Diya 3', 17'; Naz 6', 9', 15', 16'; Ekka 8'; Kujur 10', 13', 20'; Manjhi 11', 13'; Topno 18'	Report		Stadium: Hockey Oman

23 July 2026 Hockey5s Asia Cup Elite	Kazakhstan	0–10	India	Muscat, Oman
18:30		Report	Naz 1', 1', 15', 20'; Sa. Kumari 11', 16', 18'; Ekka 15'; Topno 17'; Manjhi 19'	Stadium: Hockey Oman

24 July 2026 Hockey5s Asia Cup Elite	India	3–6	China	Muscat, Oman
18:30	Sa. Kumari 1'; Ekka 6', 18'	Report	Guo 2', 13', 20'; Ge 3'; Lu 10', 20'	Stadium: Hockey Oman

24 July 2026 Hockey5s Asia Cup Elite	Uzbekistan	0–10	India	Muscat, Oman
20:30		Report	Sh. Kumari 1'; Ekka 3'; Naz 3', 7', 17'; Kujur 4'; Topno 6'; Sa. Kumari 7', 13'; Diya 12'	Stadium: Hockey Oman

25 July 2026 Hockey5s Asia Cup Semi final	India	8–1	Kazakhstan	Muscat, Oman
19:30	Sa. Kumari 5'; Manjhi 6', 8', 8'; Diya 13', 16'; Sh. Kumari 16'; Naz 20'	Report	Mazhim 10'	Stadium: Hockey Oman

25 July 2026 Hockey5s Asia Cup Final	China	4–2	India	Muscat, Oman
23:30	Lu 1'; Tang 5'; Guo 6'; Ge 19'	Report	Naz 13'; Manjhi 20'	Stadium: Hockey Oman

== Head-to-head record ==
Won more matches than lost
All matches drawn
Won equal matches to lost
Lost more matches than won

=== Overall record ===
Record last updated as of the following match:

India vs China at Hockey Oman, Muscat in the 2026 Women's U18 Hockey5's Asia Cup, 25 July 2026

Opponent	GP	W	D	L	GF	GA	Win %	Last meeting
Argentina	2	0	0	2	3	8	0%	2018
Austria	1	1	0	0	4	2	100%	2018
China	5	1	1	3	11	16	20%	2026
Malaysia	1	1	0	0	4	2	100%	2018
Kazakhstan	3	3	0	0	26	4	100%	2026
Poland	1	1	0	0	3	0	100%	2018
Singapore	1	1	0	0	14	0	100%	2018
South Africa	1	1	0	0	5	2	100%	2018
South Korea	1	1	0	0	10	0	100%	2018
Thailand	1	1	0	0	9	0	100%	2018
Uruguay	1	1	0	0	2	1	100%	2018
Uzbekistan	2	2	0	0	26	0	100%	2026
Vanuatu	1	1	0	0	16	0	100%	2018
Total	21	15	1	5	133	35	71.43%	2026

== See also ==
Indian national hockey teams
Men's					Women's				
Senior	Under-21	Under-18	Senior Hockey5s	Under-18 hockey5s	Senior	Under-21	Under-18	Senior Hockey5s	Under-18 hockey5s

- Field hockey in India
- India national para hockey team
