= Field hockey at the Summer Youth Olympics =

- Governing body: FIH
- Events: 2 (men: 1; women: 1)

Games
- 2010; 2014; 2018

Field hockey was introduced at the Youth Olympic Games at the inaugural edition in 2010 for both boys and girls. At the 2010 Games, field hockey was held in the 11-a-side format. From the 2014 Games, the Hockey 5s format, a 5-a-side tournament played on a smaller-sized field, has been contested.

== Boys ==
=== 11-a-side Summary ===
Year	Host nation	Gold Medal match			Bronze Medal match		
Year	Host nation	Champions	Score	Runners-up	3rd place	Score	4th place
2010; Details	Singapore	Australia	2–1	Pakistan	Belgium	4–1	Ghana

==== Team appearances ====
Team	2010
Australia	1st
Belgium	3rd
Chile	6th
Ghana	4th
Pakistan	2nd
Singapore	5th

=== Hockey5s Summary ===
Year	Host nation	Gold Medal match			Bronze Medal match		
Year	Host nation	Champions	Score	Runners-up	3rd place	Score	4th place
2014; Details	Nanjing, China	Australia	3–3 (3–2) (penalties)	Canada	Spain	7–4	South Africa
2018; Details	Buenos Aires, Argentina	Malaysia	4–2	India	Argentina	4–0	Zambia

==== Team appearances ====
Team	2014	2018	Total
Argentina	-	3rd	1
Australia	1st	6th	2
Austria	-	7th	1
Bangladesh	10th	8th	2
Canada	2nd	10th	2
Spain	3rd	-	1
Germany	9th	-	1
India	-	2nd	1
Kenya	-	11th	1
Malaysia	-	1st	1
Mexico	8th	9th	2
New Zealand	6th	-	1
Pakistan	5th	-	1
Poland	-	5th	1
South Africa	4th	-	1
Vanuatu	-	12th	1
Zambia	7th	4th	2
Total	10	12	—N/a

== Girls ==
=== 11-a-side Summary ===
Year	Host nation	Gold Medal match			Bronze Medal match		
Year	Host nation	Champions	Score	Runners-up	3rd place	Score	4th place
2010; Details	Singapore	Netherlands	2–1 (a.e.t)	Argentina	New Zealand	5–4 (a.e.t)	South Korea

=== Team appearances ===
Team	2010
Argentina	2nd
Ireland	5th
Netherlands	1st
New Zealand	3rd
South Africa	6th
South Korea	4th

=== Hockey5s Summary ===
Year	Host nation	Gold Medal match			Bronze Medal match		
Year	Host nation	Champions	Score	Runners-up	3rd place	Score	4th place
2014; Details	Nanjing, China	China	5–5 (3–2) (penalties)	Netherlands	Argentina	5–2	Japan
2018; Details	Buenos Aires, Argentina	Argentina	3–1	India	China	6–0	South Africa

=== Team appearances ===
Team	2014	2018	Total
Argentina	3rd	1st	2
Australia	-	5th	1
Austria	-	6th	1
China	1st	3rd	2
Fiji	10th	-	1
Germany	7th	-	1
India	-	2nd	1
Japan	4th	-	1
Mexico	-	11th	1
Namibia	-	8th	1
Netherlands	2nd	-	1
New Zealand	5th	-	1
Poland	-	7th	1
South Africa	8th	4th	2
Uruguay	6th	9th	2
Vanuatu	-	12th	1
Zambia	9th	-	1
Zimbabwe	-	10th	1
Total	10	12	—N/a

== Medal table ==
As of the 2018 Summer Youth Olympics.

Rank	Nation	Gold	Silver	Bronze	Total
1	Australia	2	0	0	2
2	Argentina	1	1	2	4
3	Netherlands	1	1	0	2
4	China	1	0	1	2
5	Malaysia	1	0	0	1
6	India	0	2	0	2
7	Canada	0	1	0	1
7	Pakistan	0	1	0	1
9	Belgium	0	0	1	1
9	New Zealand	0	0	1	1
9	Spain	0	0	1	1
Totals (11 entries)		6	6	6	18

== See also ==
- Field hockey at the Summer Olympics
