= Women's FIH Youth Hockey5s World Cup =

Youth Hockey5s World Cup tournament

- Upcoming season or competition: 2026 Women's FIH Youth Hockey5s World Cup
- Sport: Hockey5s
- Founded: 2026
- First season: 2026
- No. of teams: 12
- Continent: International (FIH)

The Women's FIH Youth Hockey5s World Cup will be an international hockey5s world championship for the under-18 girls, organised by the International Hockey Federation (FIH). The first tournament will be held in 2026.

== Background ==
The International Hockey Federation (FIH) announced the establishment of the inaugural FIH Youth Hockey5s World Cup in September 2026. The tournament was introduced to provide an international competition pathway for under-18 players following changes to hockey's participation in the Youth Olympics. Hockey5s replaced the 11-a-side hockey at the 2014 and 2018 Youth Olympics. However, following the postponement of the 2022 Youth Olympics and the classification of hockey5s as a non-medal engagement sport at the 2026 Youth Olympics, the FIH decided to organize the world championship for the youth.

In addition to the competition, the programme includes athlete development and leadership initiatives focused on hockey skills, Olympic values and officiating.

== Results ==
Year	Host	Final			Third place match			Number of teams
Year	Host	Winner	Score	Runner-up	Third place	Score	Fourth place	Number of teams
2026; Details	Cairo, Egypt							12

== Team appearances ==
Team	(Egypt) 2026	Total
Brazil		1
China		1
Egypt		1
India		1
Iran		1
Kazakhstan		1
Kenya		1
Nigeria		1
Poland		1
South Africa		1
Ukraine		1
Uruguay		1
Total	12	

== See also ==
- FIH Women's Hockey5s World Cup
