= India women's national under-18 field hockey team =

Under-18 hockey team that represents India

India U18 girls
- Association: Hockey India
- Confederation: AHF (Asia)
- Head Coach: (India) Rani Rampal
- Captain: Sweety Kujur

Last international
- India 3–0 South Korea (Kakamigahara, 6 June 2026)

Biggest win
- India 25–0 Singapore (Kakamigahara, 3 June 2026)

Girls' Asia Cup
- Appearances: 5 (first in 2000)
- Best result: (gold) Champions (2000)
Medal record
Girls' Asia Cup
Gold medal – first place	2000 Kowloon
Bronze medal – third place	2011 Bangkok
Bronze medal – third place	2016 Bangkok
Bronze medal – third place	2026 Kakamigahara

The India women's national under-18 field hockey team represents India at international field hockey youth tournaments, governed by Hockey India. They won the inaugural Girls' Asia Cup in 2000.

== History ==
India U18 girls team made their first international debut at the inaugural U18 Asia Cup in 2000, held at Kowloon. They won the tournament, beating Japan by 3–1 in the final. India lost the semi-final clash against eventual champions South Korea in the 2009 Asia Cup and finished 4th. They missed out on qualification for the inaugural Youth Olympics as only the tournament champions qualified. In the 2011 Asia Cup, India topped the group stage, winning all the matches, before narrowly going down to Japan in the semi-final. They won bronze in that tournament after beating Korea by 2–0. In the 2016 Asia Cup, India missed the final spot in the penalty shoot-out loss to Japan in the semi final. They finished with the bronze medal after a 3–0 win over Korea.

Indian U17 side toured Netherlands for their first international tournament. They won Ede club by 3–2 in their first match. They lost to Netherlands U18 team by 3–7 and to Netherlands U16 team by 2–6 and 1–4 in successive matches.

India did not participate in the 2025 U18 Asia Cup. Australia U18 team played a four-match series against India at Udhav Das Mehta (Bhai Ji) Central SAI Centre in Bhopal in May 2026. India lost the first three matches by the scorelines 3–4, 1–4 and 1–2 before winning the last match by 4–1. Australia sealed the series 3–1.

India competed in the 2026 Asia Cup, where they lost to China in the penalties in the clash for final spot. They added another bronze to their cabinet after winning Korea.

== Tournament record ==
=== Summer Youth Olympics ===
Summer Youth Olympics
Year	Host	Round	Position	Pld	W	D	L	GF	GA
2010	Singapore, Singapore	Did not qualify							

=== Girls' Asia Cup ===
Girls' Asia Cup
Year	Host	Round	Position	Pld	W	D	L	GF	GA
2000 (Note: Complete group-stage results are not available in published official records.)	Kowloon, Hong Kong	Final	1st place, gold medalist(s)	2	1	0	1	4	3
2009 (Note: The scoreline against South Korea could not be verified from available records and not included.)	Shanghai, China	Semi final	4th	5	2	1	2	33	5
2011	Bangkok, Thailand	Semi final	3rd	6	5	0	1	38	7
2016	Bangkok, Thailand	Semi final	3rd	5	4	1	0	14	4
2025	Dazhou, China	Did not participate							
2026	Kakamigahara, Japan	Semi final	3rd	5	4	1	0	35	4
	Total		1 Title	23	16	3	4	124	23

Youth Asia Cup (2000–2011) history
Year	Round	Score	Result
2001	–	India 1–2 Japan	Loss
2001	Final	India 3–1 Japan	Win
2009	Group	India 20–0 Sri Lanka	Win
2009	Group	India 2–2 China	Draw
2009	Group	India 10–0 Thailand	Win
2009	Semi final	India v South Korea	Loss
2009	3/4	India 1–3 Japan	Loss
2011	Group stage	India 12–0 Kazakhstan	Win
2011	Group stage	India 13–0 Sri Lanka	Win
2011	Group stage	India 4–2 China	Win
2011	Group stage	India 4–1 Malaysia	Win
2011	Semi final	Japan 4–3 India	Loss
2011	3/4	India 2–0 South Korea	Win

== Honours ==
=== Major tournaments ===
- Girls' Asia Cup:
  - (gold) Champions: 2000
  - (bronze) Bronze medal: 2011, 2016, 2026

== Current squad ==
The following Indian team named for the 2026 U18 Asia Cup, held at Kakamigahara, from 29 May to 6 June 2026

Head coach: (India) Rani Rampal

Players, caps and goals updated as of 6 June 2026.

No.	Pos.	Player	Date of birth (age)	Caps	Goals	Club
20	GK	Khili Kumari	23 November 2010 (age 15)	4		
1	GK	Mahak Parihar	30 October 2011 (age 15)	5		
27	DF	Kiran Ekka	5 September 2010 (age 16)	5	2	
16	DF	Nilam Toppo	16 April 2011 (age 15)	5		
11	DF	Rubina Baxla	7 August 2010 (age 16)	5		
14	DF	Sugan Sanga	27 August 2011 (age 15)	5		
3	DF	Sulochani	20 May 2012 (age 14)	5		
9	MF	Diya	13 October 2011 (age 15)	5	1	
8	MF	Geetashree Nammi	28 July 2013 (age 13)	5	5	
4	MF	Pushpa Manjhi	1 May 2010 (age 16)	5	1	
36	MF	Rasmeen Kaur	22 February 2011 (age 15)	5	1	
63	MF	Shruti Kumari	1 January 2010 (age 16)	5	2	
10	MF	Sneha Davde	28 March 2010 (age 16)	3		
2	FW	Nancy Saroha	2 May 2010 (age 16)	5	1	
5	FW	Nousheen Naz	13 July 2010 (age 16)	5	12	
12	FW	Priyanka Minz	3 October 2010 (age 16)	5	3	
15	FW	Sandeepa Kumari	18 March 2010 (age 16)	5	2	
25	FW	Sweety Kujur (Captain)	14 February 2010 (age 16)	5	5	

== Coaching staff ==
Position	Name
Head coach	(India) Rani Rampal
Coach	(India) Prabal Panday
Strength and Conditioning Coach	(India) Manish Sai
Physiotherapist	(India) Priya Jaiswal
Video Analyst	(India) Abhijeet Hazary
Masseuse	(India) Jagroshni

== Results and fixtures ==
The following is a list of match results in the last 12 months, as well as any future matches that have been scheduled.

Win Draw Loss Fixture

=== 2026 ===
All times are local (UTC+5:30).

15 May 2026 Practice Match 1	India	3–4	Australia	Bhopal, India
19:00		Report		Stadium: Udhav Das Mehta (Bhai Ji) Central Centre

17 May 2026 Practice Match 2	India	1–4	Australia	Bhopal, India
17:00		Report		Stadium: Udhav Das Mehta (Bhai Ji) Central Centre

18 May 2026 Practice Match 3	India	1–2	Australia	Bhopal, India
19:00		Report		Stadium: Udhav Das Mehta (Bhai Ji) Central Centre

20 May 2026 Practice Match 4	India	4–1	Australia	Bhopal, India
08:00		Report		Stadium: Udhav Das Mehta (Bhai Ji) Central Centre

30 May 2026 Asia Cup Pool A	India	2–1	Malaysia	Kakamigahara, Japan
05:30	Naz 19', 28'	Report	Azli 41'	Stadium: Kawasaki Heavy Industries Hockey Stadium

31 May 2026 Asia Cup Pool A	South Korea	1–3	India	Kakamigahara, Japan
05:30	Ryu 41'	Report	Naz 4'; Sh. Kumari 21'; Ekka 43'	Stadium: Kawasaki Heavy Industries Hockey Stadium

3 June 2026 Asia Cup Pool A	India	25–0	Singapore	Kakamigahara, Japan
05:30	Kujur 2', 24', 38', 45'; Naz 8', 13', 17', 18', 40', 52', 58'; Nammi 13', 28', 47', 48', 60'; Minz 22', 37', 53'; Diya 27'; Saroha 36'; Sh. Kumari 40'; Manjhi 47'; Rashmeen 47'; Sa. Kumari 51'	Report		Stadium: Kawasaki Heavy Industries Hockey Stadium

5 June 2026 Asia Cup Semi-final	India	2–2 (1–3 p)	China	Kakamigahara, Japan
09:30	Naz 3'; Ekka 54'	Report	Li 24'; Zhang 48'	Stadium: Kawasaki Heavy Industries Hockey Stadium
	Penalties
	Naz (penalty shoot-out missed); Minz (penalty shoot-out missed); Kumari (penalty shoot-out scored); Ekka (penalty shoot-out missed)		(penalty shoot-out scored) Lu; (penalty shoot-out scored) Ge; (penalty shoot-out scored) Guo

6 June 2026 Asia Cup Bronze medal match	India	3–0	South Korea	Kakamigahara, Japan
09:30	Sa. Kumari 2'; Kujur 16'; Naz 33'	Report		Stadium: Kawasaki Heavy Industries Hockey Stadium

== Head-to-head record ==
Won more matches than lost
All matches drawn
Won equal matches to lost
Lost more matches than won

=== Overall record ===
Record last updated as of the following match:

India vs South Korea at Kawasaki Heavy Industries Hockey Stadium, Kakamigahara in the 2026 U18 Asia Cup, 6 June 2026 (excluding friendlies & practice tournaments)

Opponent	GP	W	D	L	GF	GA	Win %	Last meeting
China	4	2	2	0	11	8	50%	2026
Chinese Taipei	1	1	0	0	4	0	100%	2016
Japan	5	1	1	3	9	11	20%	2016
South Korea	5	4	0	1	11	1	80%	2026
Kazakhstan	1	1	0	0	12	0	100%	2011
Malaysia	3	3	0	0	9	3	100%	2026
Singapore	1	1	0	0	25	0	100%	2026
Sri Lanka	2	2	0	0	33	0	100%	2011
Thailand	1	1	0	0	10	0	100%	2009
Total	23	16	3	4	124	23	69.57%	2026

== See also ==
Indian national hockey teams
Men's					Women's				
Senior	Under-21	Under-18	Senior Hockey5s	Under-18 hockey5s	Senior	Under-21	Under-18	Senior Hockey5s	Under-18 hockey5s

- Field hockey in India
- India national para hockey team
