= 2016 Women's Hockey U18 Asia Cup =

Asian field hockey tournament

Tournament details
- Host country: Thailand
- City: Bangkok
- Dates: 16–22 December 2016
- Teams: 8 (from 1 confederation)
- Venue: Queen Sirikit's 60th Anniversary Stadium

Final positions
- Champions: China (1st title)
- Runner-up: Japan
- Third place: India

The 2016 Women's Hockey U18 Asia Cup was the fourth edition of the women's Hockey U18 Asia Cup. The tournament had eight Asian girls' national teams contested, organized by the Asian Hockey Federation. The tournament was held in Bangkok, Thailand from 16th to 22nd December 2016.

China won their first championship after defeating Japan in the final. India clinched the bronze, defeating South Korea.

== Teams ==
- China
- Chinese Taipei
- India
- Japan
- Malaysia
- Singapore
- South Korea
- Thailand

== Preliminary round ==
All times are local (UTC+7)

=== Pool A ===
| Pos | Team | Pld | W | D | L | GF | GA | GD | Pts | Qualification |
|---|---|---|---|---|---|---|---|---|---|---|
| 1 | India | 3 | 3 | 0 | 0 | 10 | 3 | +7 | 9 | Semi-finals |
| 2 | China | 3 | 1 | 1 | 1 | 16 | 7 | +9 | 4 | Semi-finals |
| 3 | Malaysia | 3 | 1 | 1 | 1 | 10 | 6 | +4 | 4 | Classification round |
| 4 | Chinese Taipei | 3 | 0 | 0 | 3 | 3 | 23 | −20 | 0 | Classification round |

Source: Report
Rules for classification: 1) points; 2) matches won; 3) goal difference; 4) goals for; 5) head-to-head result; 6) field goals for.

16 December 2016
14:00

| China | 2–2 | Malaysia |
|---|---|---|
| | Report |

16 December 2016
16:00

| India | 4–0 | Chinese Taipei |
|---|---|---|
| | Report |

17 December 2016
14:00

| Malaysia | 7–1 | Chinese Taipei |
|---|---|---|
| | Report |

17 December 2016
16:00

| India | 3–2 | China |
|---|---|---|
| | Report |

19 December 2016
14:00

| China | 12–2 | Chinese Taipei |
|---|---|---|
| | Report |

19 December 2016
16:00

| Malaysia | 1–3 | India |
|---|---|---|
| | Report |

=== Pool B ===
| Pos | Team | Pld | W | D | L | GF | GA | GD | Pts | Qualification |
|---|---|---|---|---|---|---|---|---|---|---|
| 1 | South Korea | 3 | 3 | 0 | 0 | 17 | 1 | +16 | 9 | Semi-finals |
| 2 | Japan | 3 | 2 | 0 | 1 | 23 | 4 | +19 | 6 | Semi-finals |
| 3 | Thailand (H) | 3 | 1 | 0 | 2 | 2 | 15 | −13 | 3 | Classification round |
| 4 | Singapore | 3 | 0 | 0 | 3 | 1 | 23 | −22 | 0 | Classification round |

Source: Report
Rules for classification: 1) points; 2) matches won; 3) goal difference; 4) goals for; 5) head-to-head result; 6) field goals for.
(H) Hosts

16 December 2016
18:00

| Japan | 13–0 | Singapore |
|---|---|---|
| | Report |

16 December 2016
20:00

| South Korea | 5–0 | Thailand |
|---|---|---|
| | Report |

17 December 2016
18:00

| Japan | 1–4 | South Korea |
|---|---|---|
| | Report |

17 December 2016
20:00

| Thailand | 2–1 | Singapore |
|---|---|---|
| | Report |

19 December 2016
18:00

| South Korea | 8–0 | Singapore |
|---|---|---|
| | Report |

19 December 2016
20:00

| Thailand | 0–9 | Japan |
|---|---|---|
| | Report |

== Classification round ==
=== Seventh place match ===
21 December 2016
15:30

| Chinese Taipei | 4–1 | Singapore |
|---|---|---|
| | Report |

=== Fifth place match ===
22 December 2016
15:30

| Malaysia | 8–0 | Thailand |
|---|---|---|
| | Report |

== Medal round ==
Semi-finals
21 December
India | 1 (2)
Japan (s.o.) | 1 (4)
21 December
South Korea | 1 (2)
China (s.o.) | 1 (3)

Final
22 December
Japan | 2
China | 4
Third place
22 December
India | 3
South Korea | 0

=== Semi finals ===
21 December 2016
17:45

| India | 1–1 | Japan |
|---|---|---|
| | Report |
Penalties
| | 2–4 |

21 December 2016
20:00

| South Korea | 1–1 | China |
|---|---|---|
| | Report |
Penalties
| | 2–3 |

=== Third place match ===
22 December 2016
17:45

| India | 3–0 | South Korea |
|---|---|---|
| | Report |

=== Final ===
22 December 2016
20:00

| Japan | 2–4 | China |
|---|---|---|
| | Report |

== Winners ==
2016 Women's Hockey U18 Asia Cup
(China)
China
1st title

== Final standings ==
| Pos | Team | Pld | W | D | L | GF | GA | GD | Pts | |
|---|---|---|---|---|---|---|---|---|---|---|
| 1st place, gold medalist(s) | China | 5 | 2 | 2 | 1 | 21 | 10 | +11 | 8 | Champions |
| 2nd place, silver medalist(s) | Japan | 5 | 2 | 1 | 2 | 26 | 9 | +17 | 7 | Runners up |
| 3rd place, bronze medalist(s) | India | 5 | 4 | 1 | 0 | 14 | 4 | +10 | 13 | 3rd |
| 4 | South Korea | 5 | 3 | 1 | 1 | 18 | 5 | +13 | 10 | 4th |
| 5 | Malaysia | 4 | 2 | 1 | 1 | 18 | 6 | +12 | 7 | Eliminated in group stage |
| 6 | Thailand (H) | 4 | 1 | 0 | 3 | 2 | 23 | −21 | 3 | Eliminated in group stage |
| 7 | Chinese Taipei | 4 | 1 | 0 | 3 | 7 | 24 | −17 | 3 | Eliminated in group stage |
| 8 | Singapore | 4 | 0 | 0 | 4 | 2 | 27 | −25 | 0 | Eliminated in group stage |

Source: Report
(H) Hosts

== See also ==
- 2016 Men's Hockey U18 Asia Cup
