= Women's Hockey U18 Asia Cup =

International U18 field hockey tournament

- Most recent season or competition: 2026 Women's Hockey U18 Asia Cup
- Formerly: Girls' Sub-Junior Asia Cup
- Sport: Field hockey
- Founded: 2000; 26 years ago
- First season: 2000
- No. of teams: 8
- Confederation: Asian Hockey Federation
- Most recent champion: China (2nd title) (2026)
- Most titles: Japan; China (2 titles)

The Women's Hockey U18 Asia Cup is a girls' international under-18 field hockey tournament organized by the Asian Hockey Federation. The tournament has been held since 2000. China are the defending champions, having won the 2026 title.

The tournament has been won by four different teams: India has won the inaugural tournament. Japan and China have each won two titles. Korea has won the tournament once.

The second edition of the tournament served as the continental qualifier for the inaugural Youth Olympics, with the winners securing the sole qualification spot.

== Results ==
| # | Year | Host | Final | | | Third place match | | | Teams |
| # | Year | Host | Winner | Score | Runner-up | Third place | Score | Fourth place | Teams |
|---|---|---|---|---|---|---|---|---|---|
| 1 | 2000 | Kowloon, Hong Kong | India | 3–1 | Japan | Hong Kong | 2–0 | Sri Lanka | No Data |
| 2 | 2009 | Shanghai, China | South Korea | 2–1 | China | Japan | 3–1 | India | 7 |
| 3 | 2011 | Bangkok, Thailand | Japan | 1–0 | China | India | 2–0 | South Korea | 10 |
| 4 | 2016 | Bangkok, Thailand | China | 4–2 | Japan | India | 3–0 | South Korea | 8 |
| 5 | 2025 | Dazhou, China | Japan | 1–0 | China | Bangladesh | 6–2 | Kazakhstan | 8 |
| 6 | 2026 | Kakamigahara, Japan | China | 2–1 | Japan | India | 3–0 | South Korea | 8 |

== Successful national teams ==
Teams reaching the top four
| Team | Champions | Runners-up | Third place | Fourth place |
|---|---|---|---|---|
| Japan | 2 (2011, 2025) | 3 (2000, 2016, 2026*) | 1 (2009) | |
| China | 2 (2016, 2026) | 3 (2009*, 2011, 2025*) | | |
| India | 1 (2000) | | 3 (2011, 2016, 2026) | 1 (2009) |
| South Korea | 1 (2009) | | | 3 (2011, 2016, 2026) |
| Hong Kong | | | 1 (2000*) | |
| Bangladesh | | | 1 (2025) | |
| Sri Lanka | | | | 1 (2000) |
| Kazakhstan | | | | 1 (2025) |

* = host country

== See also ==
- Women's U18 Hockey5's Asia Cup
- Women's Hockey Asia Cup
