= Pankaj Kumar Rajak =

Indian field hockey player (born 1999)

Personal information
- Born: 30 March 1999 (age 27) Hurhuru-Patratu, Hazaribagh, Bihar (now in Jharkhand), India

Sport
- Sport: Field hockey
- Position: Goalkeeper
Youth career
- Years: Team
- 2016: India U18
Senior career
Years	Team	Caps	Goals
–	Indian Oil	-	-
National team
Years	Team	Caps	Goals
2015–2020	India U21		-
2016–	India	2	-
Medal record
Men's field hockey
Representing India
Asia Cup
Bronze medal – third place	2022 Jakarta
South Asian Games
Silver medal – second place	2016 Guwahati/Shillong	Team
Boys' Asia Cup
Gold medal – first place	2016 Dhaka
- Updated on 26 May 2022

Pankaj Kumar Rajak (born 30 March 1999) is an Indian field hockey player who plays as a goalkeeper. He was a member of the Indian national team that won the silver medal at the 2016 South Asian Games.

== Biography ==
Rajak hails from Hurhuru-Patratu, a village in the Hazaribagh district of India's State of Jharkhand (then a part of Bihar). His father Dadan Prasad Rajak is a washerman. Pankaj Kumar is the youngest among four siblings.

== Career ==
Rajak enrolled in the Hazaribagh Day Boarding Centre in 2009 and was suggested to take up goalkeeping by his first coach Koleshwar Gope. Rajak trained there till 2012 before moving to Sports Authority of India, Ranchi where he stayed till 2014. He was a part of the Jharkhand squad in 2013 and 2014 for the sub-junior national championships. He subsequently moved to SAIL Hockey Academy in Rourkela, where he was picked for the under-21 national team that competed at the Volve Hockey Open Cup the following year in England. Rajak then played at the 2016 South Asian Games and won silver with the under-21 team that India fielded for the Games. He also featured in the squads that won gold at the 2016 u-18 Asia Cup and bronze at the u-21 2017 Sultan of Johor Cup during this time. In the club level, he plays for his employer Indian Oil.

In May 2022, Rajak was selected in India's 20-member squad for the 2022 Men's Hockey Asia Cup in Indonesia. His selection was notable in Jharkhand, as he became the first male hockey player from the state in more than a decade to earn a place in the senior Indian men's team, following former India midfielder Bimal Lakra's last national-team appearance in 2008.

== International Achievements ==
- Gold Medal (2016): Won the championship at the Under-18 Asia Cup held in Dhaka, Bangladesh.

- Goalkeeper of the tournament (2016): Under-18 Asia Cup held in Dhaka, Bangladesh.

- Silver Medal (2016): Secured second place at the 2016 South Asian Games with the Indian Under-21 team.

- Bronze Medal: Earned a podium finish at the Under-21 Sultan of Johor Cup in Malaysia.

- Senior National Selection (2022): Named in the 20-member Indian men's senior squad for the prestigious Asia Cup tournament.
