= 2026 Men's Hockey U18 Asia Cup =

Asian field hockey tournament

Tournament details
- Host country: Japan
- City: Kakamigahara
- Dates: 29 May–6 June
- Teams: 9 (from 1 confederation)
- Venue: Kawasaki Heavy Industries Hockey Stadium

Final positions
- Champions: India (3rd title)
- Runner-up: Japan
- Third place: Pakistan

Tournament statistics
- Matches played: 22
- Goals scored: 142 (6.45 per match)
- Top scorer: (India) Ashish Tani Purti (13 goals)
- Best player: (Japan) Yoga Inukai
- Best young player: (Pakistan) Muhammad Yahya Najeeb
- Best goalkeeper: (India) Ayush Rajak

The 2026 Men's Hockey U18 Asia Cup was the sixth edition of the Men's Hockey U18 Asia Cup. A total of nine Asian boys' national teams contested, organized by the Asian Hockey Federation. The tournament was held in Kakamigahara, Japan from 29 May to 6 June 2026, alongside the girls' tournament. India won the gold for the third time, beating the defending champions Japan 4–1 in the final and Pakistan secured the bronze, defeating Malaysia by 3–0.

All matches were live-streamed on the official YouTube channel of the Asian Hockey Federation.

== Venue ==
(Japan) Kakamigahara
Kawasaki Heavy Industries Hockey Stadium
Capacity: 1,630
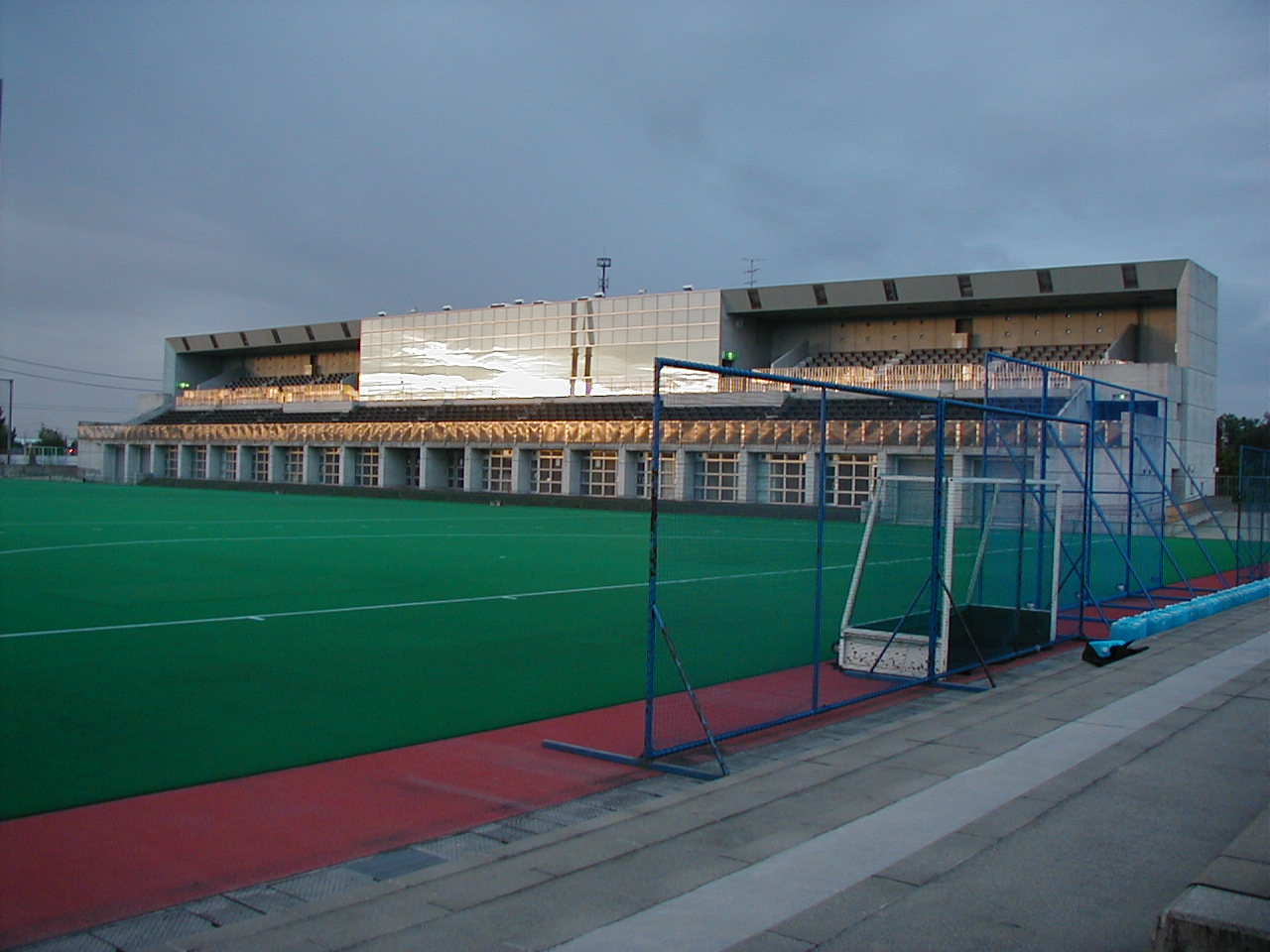

== Teams ==
Bangladesh

Head Coach: (Bangladesh) Mohammad Moududur Rahman

1. Ahosanul Kaif(GK)
2. Munna Islam
3. Partho Roy
4. Nasimul Islam
5. Sabbir Rahman
7. Sohorab Soton
8. Rimon Hasan
9. Ismail Hosen
10. Din Islam(C)
11. Jony Islam
12. Elias Mia
15. Akash Tuhin
16. Nure Alom
17. Nuronnabi Shawon
18. Md Rahman(GK)
20. Ashraful Alam
21. Tarek Islam
23. Tawsan Hossain
China

Head Coach: (China) Yijun Meng

1. Zhiyuan Zhang(GK)
2. Gao Peng
3. Mao Weiyan
5. Youwei Zhang
6. Chen Xingcai
7. Liao Yongtao
8. Liao Jiazhen
9. Hei Jiucili
10. Lin Jiaxing(C)
11. Weng Yunyi
12. Cai Lize
17. Guo Yueming
19. Ding Zixuan
20. Zhang Jiaqi
22. Eli Buku
25. Zhu Jiajie
26. Bolang Xuan
32. Liang Jinglang(GK)
Chinese Taipei

Head Coach: (Chinese Taipei) Tsai Ming-Heng

1. Liang Min-Yi(GK)
2. Wang Yao-Kuan
5. Chen Bo-Yan
6. Wang Zi-Chien
7. Chang Chun-Yao
8. Lo Hao-Kai
9. Hsu Shao-Wei
10. Liou Sheng-You
11. He Yue-Fong(C)
12. Cheng Hung-Kai
14. Wang Jun-Wei
15. Lee Yu-Han
16. Li Mai-Ke
17. Syu Jyun-Hao
19. Chang Yao-Sheng
20. Jhang Yong-Jyun
22. Yeh Cheng-Wei(GK)
23. Liang Tien-An
India

Head Coach: (India) Sardar Singh

3. Arman Soreng
4. Ansh Bahutra
5. Rahul Yadav
6. Karan Gautam
7. Arshdip Singh
8. Prahalad Rajbhar
9. Sharukh Ali
10. Gazee Khan
11. Ketan Kushwaha(C)
12. Varinder Singh
16. Sawan Kumar(GK)
17. Ashish Tani Purti
18. Romit Pal
20. Avi Manikpuri
22. Akash Deep
41. Premchand Soy
54. Ayush Rajak(GK)
77. Siddharth Ben
Japan

Head Coach: (Japan) Takeshi Tamekuni

1. Haruku Iwazaki(GK)
2. Yamato Nakamura(GK)
4. Gaku Numada
5. Hiyu Kinoshita
6. Kei Ushikubo
7. Koki Miyamoto
8. Kengo Matsuzaki
11. Reo Sasaki
13. Aone Takahashi
14. Kengo Yasui
16. Mahiro Yoshioka(C)
17. Mizuki Nishimura
20. Hibiki Kobayashi
21. Kotaro Jogi
22. Shuku Shirakaba
23. Dobashi Takuya
24. Tatsuya Mori
27. Yuma Fujiwara
28. Yoga Inukai
29. Atsuhiro Watanabe
Kazakhstan

Head Coach: (Kazakhstan) Radmir Chernov

1. Nurfat Kissetayev
4. Nurali Kassymzhan
5. Arkat Sarybay
7. Magzhan Nurmambet
9. Aldiyar Zauruly
10. Bauyrzhan Toktar
11. Dossymzhan Tursyngali
15. Adilsultan Turymdy(C)
16. Ziyat Nurgozhin(GK)
17. Arnur Dautaliyev
19. Gani Kydyrbay
20. Bekzhan Beketov
21. Muslim Makhsat
22. Aryn Kassymkhan
30. Daryn Tursynbay(GK)
33. Amanat Alimkulov
30. Yadikar Myrgiyas
South Korea

Head Coach: (South Korea) Jeong Yongkyun

1. Kim Gyubeen(GK)
2. Yun Jaehyeok(C)
3. Park Jaehyeon
4. Sim Hyeonseong
5. Ham Sangyeon
6. Hwang Seonmin
7. Kim Junghun
8. Park Seongho
9. Moon Chulho
10. Kim Doyun
11. Lee Habeen
12. Kim Junseok
16. Oh Huntaek(GK)
17. Lee Jinseo
18. Kim Doyoung
22. Kim Minseo
23. Lee Hyeonjong
24. Park Juhan
Malaysia

Head Coach: (Malaysia) Mohd Harfizi Baharom

1. Nik Jeremy(GK)
2. Shelston Silverius
3. Muhammad Danial Abdullah
4. Mohammad Nor Shahir
5. Muhammad Isyraf
6. Ariq Aidil Hakimi
7. Dheeressh Gunaseelan(C)
8. Ahmad Idham Fikri
9. Abdul Yahkip
10. Amandeep Singh
11. Yogeswaran Nagulan
12. Muhammad Aizat
13. Muhammad Ashrafeel Iman
14. Mohd Harieq
15. Muhammad Nazirul
16. Muhammad Syakir(GK)
17. Muhammad Asyraff
18. Muhammad Haziq
Pakistan

Head Coach: (Pakistan) Qamar Ibrahim

1. Ghulam Mustafa(GK)
2. Asam Haider(C)
3. Muzammil Saeed
4. Muhammad Asnan
5. Muhammad Zaman
6. Hassan Akbar
7. Shahid Ullah
8. Rana Abdul Sami
9. Abdullah Awan
10. Salman Yasin
11. Adeel
12. Muhammad Zunair
13. Uzair Ahmad Qureshi
14. Muhammad Yahya Najeeb
16. Usman Ghani
19. Muhammad Usman
23. Muhammad Farhan Aslam
24. Noman(GK)

== Preliminary round ==
=== Pool A ===
| Pos | Team | Pld | W | D | L | GF | GA | GD | Pts | Qualification |
|---|---|---|---|---|---|---|---|---|---|---|
| 1 | Japan (H) | 4 | 4 | 0 | 0 | 19 | 4 | +15 | 12 | Semi-finals |
| 2 | India | 4 | 3 | 0 | 1 | 32 | 6 | +26 | 9 | Semi-finals |
| 3 | South Korea | 4 | 2 | 0 | 2 | 19 | 9 | +10 | 6 | 5–6th place classification |
| 4 | Chinese Taipei | 4 | 1 | 0 | 3 | 6 | 23 | −17 | 3 | 7–8th place classification |
| 5 | Kazakhstan | 4 | 0 | 0 | 4 | 2 | 36 | −34 | 0 | |

Source: FIH
Rules for classification: 1) points; 2) matches won; 3) goal difference; 4) goals for; 5) head-to-head result; 6) field goals scored.
(H) Hosts

All times are local (UTC+9).

29 May 2026
13:00

| India | 13–0 | Kazakhstan |
|---|---|---|
| S. Ali 12', 29'; Rajbhar 14', 51'; Kushwaha 18', 45', 45'; G. Khan 20'; Purti 30', 43'; Bahutra 31', 44'; Akash 47' | Report |

Umpires:
Salim Lucky (BAN)
Muhammad Rosli (MAS)

Player of the match – (India) Prahalad Rajbhar

29 May 2026
15:00

| South Korea | 4–1 | Chinese Taipei |
|---|---|---|
| Yun 18', 59'; Ham 38'; Kim. M 51' | Report | Y. Wang 46' |

Umpires:
Mazin Al-Shukaili (OMA)
Ghulam Mohieuddin (PAK)

Player of the match – (South Korea) Ham Sangyeon

30 May 2026
15:00

| South Korea | 13–0 | Kazakhstan |
|---|---|---|
| Yun 6', 11', 26', 34'; Sim 22'; Kim. M 33'; Kim. D 36', 51', 55', 59'; Kim. J 45+', 50'; Moon 58' | Report |

Umpires:
Masaki Shimizu (JPN)
Salim Lucky (BAN)

Player of the match – (South Korea) Yun Jaehyeok

30 May 2026
19:00

| Japan | 4–1 | Chinese Taipei |
|---|---|---|
| Fujiwara 3', 28'; Mori 25'; Kinoshita 56' | Report | Cheng 9' |

Umpires:
Mazin Al-Shukaili (OMA)
Abdulaziz Abdulkhakimov (UZB)

Player of the match – (Japan) Yuma Fujiwara

31 May 2026
17:00

| Japan | 4–2 | India |
|---|---|---|
| Yoshioka 15'; Fujiwara 20'; Yasui 34'; Takahashi 42' | Report | Purti 25'; Kushwaha 32' |

Umpires:
Su Boda (CHN)
Ghulam Mohieuddin (PAK)

Player of the match – (Japan) Mahiro Yoshioka

1 June 2026
17:00

| Chinese Taipei | 3–2 | Kazakhstan |
|---|---|---|
| Lo 21', 33'; Liang 27' | Report | Tursyngali 44'; Kissetayev 52' |

Umpires:
Abdulaziz Abdulkhakimov (UZB)
Rinky See (HKG)

Player of the match – (Chinese Taipei) Lo Hao-Kai

1 June 2026
19:00

| South Korea | 1–4 | India |
|---|---|---|
| Yun 21' | Report | Kushwaha 3', 36'; Varinder 5'; Shahrukh 54' |

Umpires:
Ravdeep Sethi (HKG)
Xiaoxu Xu (CHN)

Player of the match – (India) Arshdip Singh

2 June 2026
13:00

| Japan | 4–1 | South Korea |
|---|---|---|
| Yasui 4'; Dobashi 21'; Sasaki 24'; Mori 25' | Report | Yun 30' |

Umpires:
Su Boda (CHN)
Salim Lucky (BAN)

Player of the match – (Japan) Yamato Nakamura

3 June 2026
17:00

| India | 13–1 | Chinese Taipei |
|---|---|---|
| Gautam 7'; Soy 11'; Kushwaha 13'; Rahul 20', 54'; Purti 27', 35', 42'; Ben 30', 52'; G. Khan 40', 44'; Varinder 50' | Report | Jhang 30+' |

Umpires:
Rinky See (HKG)
Chikako Kasai (JPN)

Player of the match – (India) Ashish Tani Purti

3 June 2026
19:00

| Kazakhstan | 0–7 | Japan |
|---|---|---|
| | Report | Numada 8'; Watanabe 10', 13'; Mori 26'; Shirakaba 29'; Inukai 58', 60' |

Umpires:
Kim Jiyong (KOR)
Hazatul Abd Razak (MAS)

Player of the match – (Japan) Tatsuya Mori

=== Pool B ===
| Pos | Team | Pld | W | D | L | GF | GA | GD | Pts | Qualification |
|---|---|---|---|---|---|---|---|---|---|---|
| 1 | Pakistan | 3 | 2 | 0 | 1 | 10 | 5 | +5 | 6 | Semi-finals |
| 2 | Malaysia | 3 | 2 | 0 | 1 | 8 | 6 | +2 | 6 | Semi-finals |
| 3 | Bangladesh | 3 | 1 | 0 | 2 | 8 | 10 | −2 | 3 | 5–6th place classification |
| 4 | China | 3 | 1 | 0 | 2 | 3 | 8 | −5 | 3 | 7–8th place classification |

Source: FIH
Rules for classification: 1) points; 2) matches won; 3) goal difference; 4) goals for; 5) head-to-head result; 6) field goals scored.

All times are local (UTC+9).

30 May 2026
11:00

| Pakistan | 3–0 | China |
|---|---|---|
| Usman 6'; Adeel 11'; Yasin 56' | Report |

Umpires:
Ravdeep Sethi (HKG)
Kim Jeong Yong (KOR)

Player of the match – (Pakistan) Muhammad Asnan

30 May 2026
13:00

| Malaysia | 2–4 | Bangladesh |
|---|---|---|
| Nagulan 30'; Ariq 50' | Report | M. Islam 9', 40'; Hosen 12'; J. Islam 57' |

Umpires:
Rajendra Singh (IND)
Su Boda (CHN)

Player of the match – (Bangladesh) Munna Islam

31 May 2026
13:00

| Bangladesh | 2–3 | China |
|---|---|---|
| M. Islam 9'; Tuhin 34' | Report | Xuan 31'; Zhang 43'; Liao 49' |

Umpires:
Daulet Urmanov (KAZ)
Masaki Shimizu (JPN)

Player of the match – (China) Youwei Zhang

31 May 2026
15:00

| Pakistan | 2–3 | Malaysia |
|---|---|---|
| Saeed 42'; Aslam 60' | Report | Gunaseelan 11', 15'; Isyraf 27' |

Umpires:
Kim Jiyong (KOR)
Mazin Al-Shukaili (OMA)

Player of the match – (Malaysia) Dheeressh Gunaseelan

2 June 2026
09:00

| Malaysia | 3–0 | China |
|---|---|---|
| Gunaseelan 41'; Fikri 44'; Mohd. H 57' | Report |

Umpires:
Abdulaziz Abdulkhakimov (UZB)
Daulet Urmanov (KAZ)

Player of the match – (Malaysia) Mohammad Nor Shahir

3 June 2026
15:00

| Bangladesh | 2–5 | Pakistan |
|---|---|---|
| M. Islam 12', 35' | Report | Awan 3', 44'; Adeel 32'; Haider 39'; Najeeb 59' |

Umpires:
Ravdeep Sethi (HKG)
Mazin Al-Shukaili (OMA)

Player of the match – (Pakistan) Muhammad Yahya Najeeb

== Classification round ==
=== Seventh place game ===
5 June 2026
09:00

| Chinese Taipei | 3–4 | China |
|---|---|---|
| Li 53', 58'; Cheng 59' | Report | Lin 25', 29', 42'; Liao 37' |

Umpires:
Daulet Urmanov (KAZ)
Rajendra Singh (IND)

Player of the match – (China) Lin Jiaxing

=== Fifth place game ===
5 June 2026
11:00

| South Korea | 2–1 | Bangladesh |
|---|---|---|
| Kim. M 42'; Jaehyeon. P 48' | Report | Hosen 36' |

Umpires:
Su Boda (CHN)
Masaki Shimizu (JPN)

Player of the match – (South Korea) Kim Minseo

== Medal round ==
Semi-finals
5 June
Japan | 8
Malaysia | 1
5 June
Pakistan | 3
India | 5

Final
6 June
Japan | 1
India | 4
Third place
6 June
Malaysia | 0
Pakistan | 3

=== Semi-finals ===
5 June 2026
17:00

| Japan | 8–1 | Malaysia |
|---|---|---|
| Numada 7'; Yoshioka 11'; Dobashi 11', 20'; Inukai 21', 44', 48'; Mori 44' | Report | Gunaseelan 47' |

Umpires:
Kim Jiyong (KOR)
Ghulam Mohieuddin (PAK)

Player of the match – (Japan) Yoga Inukai

5 June 2026
19:00

| Pakistan | 3–5 | India |
|---|---|---|
| Adeel 27'; Aslam 37'; Qureshi 42' | Report | Purti 12', 49', 53', 56'; S. Ali 35' |

Umpires:
Mazin Al-Shukaili (OMA)
Ravdeep Sethi (HKG)

Player of the match – (India) Ashish Tani Purti

=== Bronze medal match ===
6 June 2026
15:00

| Malaysia | 0–3 | Pakistan |
|---|---|---|
| | Report | Qureshi 3'; Haider 23'; Adeel 59' |

Umpires:
Masaki Shimizu (JPN)
Kim Jiyong (KOR)

Player of the match – (Pakistan) Adeel

=== Gold medal match ===
6 June 2026
19:00

| Japan | 1–4 | India |
|---|---|---|
| Numada 52' | Report | Purti 2', 28', 34'; Kushwaha 30' |

Umpires:
Mazin Al-Shukaili (OMA)
Ravdeep Sethi (HKG)

Player of the match – (India) Ashish Tani Purti

== Winners ==
2026 Men's Hockey U18 Asia Cup
(India)
India
3rd title

== Awards ==
The following awards were given at the conclusion of the tournament:

| Top scorer | Best player | Promising player | Best goalkeeper |
|---|---|---|---|
| (India) Ashish Tani Purti | (Japan) Inukai Yoga | (Pakistan) Muhammad Yahya Najeeb | (India) Ayush Rajak |

== Statistics ==
=== Final standings ===
| Pos | Grp | Team | Pld | W | D | L | GF | GA | GD | Pts | |
|---|---|---|---|---|---|---|---|---|---|---|---|
| 1st place, gold medalist(s) | A | India | 6 | 5 | 0 | 1 | 41 | 10 | +31 | 15 | Champions |
| 2nd place, silver medalist(s) | A | Japan | 6 | 5 | 0 | 1 | 28 | 9 | +19 | 15 | Runners up |
| 3rd place, bronze medalist(s) | B | Pakistan | 5 | 3 | 0 | 2 | 16 | 10 | +6 | 9 | 3rd |
| 4 | B | Malaysia | 5 | 2 | 0 | 3 | 9 | 17 | −8 | 6 | 4th |
| 5 | A | South Korea | 5 | 3 | 0 | 2 | 21 | 10 | +11 | 9 | Eliminated in group stage |
| 6 | B | Bangladesh | 4 | 1 | 0 | 3 | 9 | 12 | −3 | 3 | Eliminated in group stage |
| 7 | B | China | 4 | 2 | 0 | 2 | 7 | 11 | −4 | 6 | Eliminated in group stage |
| 8 | A | Chinese Taipei | 5 | 1 | 0 | 4 | 9 | 27 | −18 | 3 | Eliminated in group stage |
| 9 | A | Kazakhstan | 4 | 0 | 0 | 4 | 2 | 36 | −34 | 0 | Eliminated in group stage |

Source: FIH

=== Goalscorers ===
There were 142 goals scored in 22 matches, for an average of 6.45 goals per match.

13 goals

- (India) Ashish Tani Purti

8 goals

- (India) Ketan Kushwaha
- (South Korea) Yun Jaehyeok

5 goals

- (Japan) Yoga Inukai
- (Bangladesh) Munna Islam

4 goals

- (Pakistan) Adeel
- (India) Shahrukh Ali
- (Malaysia) Dheeressh Gunaseelan
- (South Korea) Kim Doyun
- (Japan) Tatsuya Mori

3 goals

- (Japan) Dobashi Takuya
- (Japan) Yuma Fujiwara
- (India) Gazee Khan
- (South Korea) Kim Minseo
- (China) Lin Jiaxing
- (Japan) Gaku Numada

2 goals

- (Pakistan) Muhammad Farhan Aslam
- (Pakistan) Abdullah Awan
- (India) Ansh Bahutra
- (India) Siddharth Ben
- (Chinese Taipei) Cheng Hung-Kai
- (Pakistan) Asam Haider
- (Bangladesh) Ismail Hosen
- (South Korea) Kim Junghun
- (Chinese Taipei) Li Mai-Ke
- (China) Liao Jiazhen
- (Chinese Taipei) Lo Hao-Kai
- (Pakistan) Uzair Ahmad Qureshi
- (India) Prahalad Rajbhar
- (India) Varinder Singh
- (Japan) Atsuhiro Watanabe
- (India) Rahul Yadav
- (Japan) Kengo Yasui
- (Japan) Mahiro Yoshioka

1 goal

- (Malaysia) Ahmad Idham Fikri
- (India) Akash Deep
- (Malaysia) Ariq Aidil Hakimi
- (India) Karan Gautam
- (South Korea) Ham Sangyeon
- (Bangladesh) Jony Islam
- (Chinese Taipei) Jhang Yong-Jyun
- (Japan) Hiyu Kinoshita
- (Kazakhstan) Nurfat Kissetayev
- (Chinese Taipei) Liang Tien-An
- (Malaysia) Mohd Harieq
- (South Korea) Moon Chulho
- (Malaysia) Muhammad Isyraf
- (Pakistan) Muhammad Yahya Najeeb
- (South Korea) Park Jaehyeon
- (Pakistan) Muzammil Saeed
- (Japan) Sasaki Reo
- (Japan) Shuku Shirakaba
- (South Korea) Sim Hyeonseong
- (India) Premchand Soy
- (Japan) Aone Takahashi
- (Bangladesh) Akash Tuhin
- (Kazakhstan) Dossymzhan Tursyngali
- (Pakistan) Muhammad Usman
- (Chinese Taipei) Wang Yao-Kuan
- (China) Bolang Xuan
- (Pakistan) Salman Yasin
- (Malaysia) Yogeswaran Nagulan
- (China) Youwei Zhang

Source: FIH

== See also ==
- 2026 Men's Hockey Junior Asia Cup
