= Ranchi Royals =

Jharkhand based field hockey franchise team

- Full name: Ranchi Royals
- Nickname(s): Royals
- League: Hockey India League
- Founded: 2025
- Colors

Personnel
- Coach: Tushar Khandker; Harendra Singh
- Website: Website

Ranchi Royals is a professional field hockey franchise team based in Ranchi, Jharkhand that competes in the Hockey India League. It joined the 2025–26 edition and absorbed the men's and women's squads of defunct teams Team Gonasika and Odisha Warriors.

== Men's squad ==
=== 2026 ===
Player	Nationality
Goalkeepers
Pankaj Kumar Rajak	India
Suraj Karkera	India
Defenders
Ashish Tani Purti	India
Ravneet Singh	India
Tim Howard	Australia
Loïck Luypaert	Belgium
Nilam Sanjeep Xess	India
Anmol Ekka	India
Amir Ali	India
Midfielders
Manmeet Singh Rai	India
Yashdeep Siwach	India
Jack Waller	United Kingdom
Vishnukant Singh	India
Mustaphaa Cassiem	South Africa
Manpreet Singh	India
Forwards
Timothée Clément	France
Tom Boon	Belgium
Sam Lane	New Zealand
Araijeet Singh Hundal	India
Mandeep Singh	India

== Women's squad ==
=== 2025–26 ===
Player	Nationality
Goalkeepers
Madhuri Kuro	India
Bichu Devi Kharibam	India
Defenders
Valerie Magis	Netherlands
Lucina von der Heyde	Argentina
Claire Colwill	Australia
Lalthantluangi	India
Nikki Pradhan	India
Ishika Chaudhary	India
Midfielders
Neha Goyal	India
Paula Ortiz	Argentina
Nandini Galuja	India
Agostina Alonso	Argentina
Forwards
Agustina Albertarrio	Argentina
Beauty Dungdung	India
Sakshi Rana	India
Kanika Siwach	India
Deepika Soreng	India
Sangita Kumari	India
Rutuja Pisal	India

== Personnel record ==
=== Coaches record ===
Coach	Nationality	Team	Duration	Ref
Tushar Khandker	India	M	2026–present	
Harendra Singh	India	W	2025–present	

== Player statistics ==
=== Men's team ===
Rank	Player	Nationality	Goals
	TBA		

Source: HIL

=== Women's team ===
Rank	Player	Nationality	Goals
	TBA		

Source: HIL

== Performance record ==
Season	Team	Standing	Result	Matches	Won	Draw	Lost	Shootout		Most Goals
Season	Team	Standing	Result	Matches	Won	Draw	Lost	W	L	Most Goals
2025–26										
Total										
