= Ashish Tani Purti =

Indian field hockey player

Personal information
- Full name: Ashish Tani Purti
- Born: 24 January 2011 (age 15) Khunti, Jharkhand, India

Sport
- Sport: Field hockey
- Position: Defender; Drag flicker
Senior career
Years	Team	Caps	Goals
2024–2026	Hockey Jharkhand	18	19
2025–	Ranchi Royals	4	-
National team
Years	Team	Caps	Goals
2026–	India U18	6	(13)
2026–	India U18 Hockey5's	7	(3)
Medal record
Men's field hockey
Representing India
Boys' Asia Cup
Gold medal – first place	2026 Kakamigahara
Boys' Hockey5s Asia Cup
Gold medal – first place	2026 Muscat

Ashish Tani Purti (born 24 January 2011) is an Indian field hockey player representing national boys' hockey team and boys' hockey5s team.

== Early life ==
Ashish Tani Purti hails from Khunti in Jharkhand.

== Career ==
=== National-level and HIL journey ===
In 2022, Purti finished runner-up at the State-level Junior Nehru Hockey Tournament in Simdega and participated in the 50th National Junior Nehru Hockey Tournament in New Delhi. He also won the Khelo Jharkhand U-19 and U-14 district-level hockey tournaments in Khunti and the state-level Khelo Jharkhand tournament in Ranchi.

Purti is a cadet of the Naval Tata Hockey Academy (NTHA). Initially a defender, he later developed into a midfielder and has also played as a defensive striker and taken penalty corners, reflecting his versatility across positions. He competed as the youngest player for the Ranchi Royals team in the 2025–26 Hockey India League that won silver medal.

=== Debut for Indian youth teams ===
At the 2026 U18 Asia Cup, Purti scored hat-trick in the group match against Chinese Taipei and hit four against Pakistan in the semi-final. He also scored a championship-winning hat-trick against Japan in the final and was named Player of the Match in all three matches and as the Top Scorer of the Tournament. He won his second international gold when he represented India at the 2026 Men's U18 Hockey5's Asia Cup in Muscat. He earned his selection following a national preparatory camp held at Punjab University.
