= 2025 Men's Hockey U18 Asia Cup =

Asian field hockey tournament

Tournament details
- Host country: China
- City: Dazhou
- Dates: 3–13 July
- Teams: 11 (from 1 confederation)
- Venue: Dazhou National Hockey Training Centre

Final positions
- Champions: Japan (1st title)
- Runner-up: Pakistan
- Third place: Malaysia

Tournament statistics
- Matches played: 33
- Goals scored: 234 (7.09 per match)
- Top scorer: (Japan) Fujiwara Yuma (12 goals)
- Best player: (Malaysia) Iman Faizo
- Best young player: (Pakistan) Adeel
- Best goalkeeper: (Bangladesh) Mehedi Jinnat

The 2025 Men's Hockey U18 Asia Cup was the fifth edition of the men's Hockey U18 Asia Cup. A total of eleven Asian boys' national teams contested, organized by the Asian Hockey Federation. The tournament was held in Dazhou, China from 3rd to 13th July 2025, alongside the girls' tournament. The tournament was held nine years after the previous edition, which took place in 2016. Japan won the championship for the first time after beating Pakistan in the final and Malaysia secured the bronze, defeating the last edition's runners-up Bangladesh.

The defending champions, India did not compete in this tournament.

== Venue ==
It was the first time Dazhou hosted any international field hockey competition.

(China) Dazhou
Dazhou National Hockey Training Centre
Capacity: 1,050

== Teams ==
Bangladesh

Head Coach: (Bangladesh) Mohammad Moududur Rahman

1. Mehedi Jinnat(GK)
2. Md Mehedi
3. Munna Islam
4. Amit Hasan
5. Sabbir Rahman
6. Sajedul Sajed
7. Sohorab Soton
8. Sabbir Konok
9. Md Abdullah(C)
10. Din Islam
11. Jony Islam
12. Ismail Hosen
13. Shamim Ahahmmed
14. Ashraful Alam
15. Nure Alom
16. Rafsan Hossain
17. Bishal Ahmed
18. Md Rahman(GK)
China

Head Coach: (China) Meng Yijun

1. Zhang Zhiyuan(GK)
2. Gao Peng
3. Chen Xingcai
5. Chen Xu
6. Mao Weiyan
7. Liao Yongtao
8. Liao Jiazhen
9. Zhao Zhiyuan
10. Lin Jiaxing(C)
11. Qiu Wenxuan
12. Cao Songjun
14. Wu Jingqiu
17. Cheng Yu
18. Liao Jiayuan
20. Zhang Jinning
24. Li Jinzhong
25. Zhu Jiajie
26. Xuan Bolang
27. Hei Jiucili
32. Pan Xin(GK)
Chinese Taipei

Head Coach: (Chinese Taipei) Chen Mei-Chen

1. Lin Chun-Hung(GK)
2. Wang Yao-Kuan
5. Liang Min-Yi(GK)
6. Cai Youg-Zhi
7. Jhong Yi-Liang
8. Lo Hao-Kai
9. Hsu Shao-Wei
10. He Yue-Fong
11. Chang Yao-Sheng
12. Cheng Hung-Kai
13. Chan Po-Hung
14. Wan Wei-Zhe
15. Lin Yu-Hsiang
16. Li Mai-Ke
17. Chen Chun-Yu
21. Wei Cheng-Ze(C)
22. Shi Bo-Hao
23. Hu Jeng-Jian
Hong Kong

Head Coach: (Hong Kong) Arifali

1. Yue Pui Him
2. Tsang Cheuk Lam
3. Hui Yat Long
4. Law Ho Shun
5. Lim Joshua Zhuo Shun
6. Chris Wang
7. Yeung Ho Long
8. Li Yik Kwan
9. Lee Chun Yin
10. Marco Lee(C)
11. Ludovic Lee
12. Ng Wai Cheung
13. Jayden Leung
14. Wishavdeep Singh
15. Shek Tin Long
16. Simon Ho(GK)
17. Ng Harvey(GK)
18. Wong Yan Lok
Indonesia

Head Coach: (Indonesia) Mappajalling

1. Putra Pasha(GK)
3. Simon Renyaan
5. Iqmal Mutaqin
6. Yustinus Zebua
7. Khaerulloh Akmal
8. Muhammad Tsaqib
9. Bony Napan
10. Denny Bingku
12. Fadlie Nugraha
14. Rado Haikal
15. Muhamad Al Muroqi
16. Febi Febriansyah
17. Fikri Daenuri
20. Arthur Wibowo(C)
23. Gai Zakarias Nasa
24. Ripal Rizki(GK)
27. Irfan Prasetya
90. Wahyu Ishak
Japan

Head Coach: (Japan) Tamekuni Takeshi

1. Saito Kosuke(GK)
2. Nakamura Yamato(GK)
3. Shimizu Chihiro
4. Sasaki Haruki
5. Otsuji Koki
8. Nakanishi Kazuki
9. Furusawa Chihiro
11. Sato Yuya
14. Sasaki Ryushin
15. Yasui Kengo
16. Yoshioka Mahiro
17. Shinkami Aiki
18. Fujiwara Yuma
20. Toda Hiroki
21. Yasui Tatsuaki(C)
23. Inukai Yoga
25. Ueda Ryutaro
26. Sakai Rintaro
Kazakhstan

Head Coach: (Kazakhstan) Olga Urmanova

1. Arsen Zhanat(C)
4. Darkhan Nurbatyr
5. Arkat Sarybay
8. Mukhammed Aslanuly
11. Bekzat Kassymov
15. Adilsultan Turymdy
18. Zhenis Aukenov
19. Yernur Orazkhan
21. Magzhan Nurmambet
22. Aryn Kassymkhan
30. Ablylay Khamit(GK)
32. Daryn Turysynbay(GK)
33. Batyrkhan Kanabekov
37. Arnur Dautaliyev
55. Rasul Manatuly
Malaysia

Head Coach: (Malaysia) Sufian Mohamad

5. Izz Ilhan Azrul
6. Kulleh Benecdick A Martin
7. Dheeressh Gunaseelan
8. Thanesh Muniandy
9. A Aferullsyah
10. M Muhammad
11. M Asri
13. M Zakir Haidil Amran
14. Syahfy Saiful Mohd
15. Muhammad Danial Abdullah
16. Iman Faizo(C)
17. Azmi Ahmad Danish
18. M Rahuul
19. Hisyammudin Abdul
20. Mohd Harieq
21. Muhammad Zikril(GK)
27. Muhammad Rafiq
29. Abdul Yahkip
30. Muhammad Safwan
32. Mohamad Adib Amsyar(GK)
Pakistan

Head Coach: (Pakistan) Mukhtar Ahmad

1. Ghulam Mustafa(GK)
2. Asam Haider
3. Muhammad Hassan
4. Ali Hamza
5. Atif Ali
6. Muhammad Zaman
7. Hassan Shahbaz
8. Muhammad Shaheer
9. Abdullah Awan
10. Amir Sohail
11. Adeel(C)
12. Yaseen Jamshed(GK)
13. Muhammad Farooq
15. Muhammad Yaseen
16. Ali Hanzala
17. Zubair Latif
19. Muhammad Usman
20. Muhammad Taj
Sri Lanka

Head Coach: (Sri Lanka) Jiffery Mohomed

1. Madduma Gunawardhana(GK)
3. Sashrika Koswaththa
4. Gogulnath Balasubramaniam
5. John Sivakumar
6. Mohamed Yusuf
7. Arkam Mohamed
8. Bhagya Lankadhikari
9. Tharindu Noragal
10. Sithum Warnakulasooriya
11. Shenal Domawalage(C)
12. Deneth Maha
13. Aathif Mohamed
14. Kogul Ragawan
17. Oshada Udagedara
18. Danidu Sepala
19. Yasiru Herath
21. Stefan Antonypille(GK)
22. Vishwa Dissanayaka
Uzbekistan

Head Coach: (Uzbekistan) Okhunjon Mirzakarimov

1. Gayratbek Ganiev(GK)
2. Abdukakhkhor Abdumannobov
3. Nodirbek Yuldashev
4. Asadbek Asliddinov(C)
5. Otabek Juraev
6. Akmaljon Tursunboev
7. Ruzimukhammad Nazirov
8. Abdurakhmon Abdulazizov
9. Mironshokh Ortikboev
10. Bakhodirjon Abdurakhmonov
11. Bunyodbek Khudoynazarov
12. Fakhriddin Saydullaev
13. Muhammadkodir Avazbekov
14. Fozilbek Husanov
15. Abdulaziz Ruslanov
16. Nuriddinbek Rahmatullaev
17. Shavkatjon Kakhramonov
21. Izzatillo Yunusov(GK)

== Preliminary round ==
All times are local (UTC+8).

=== Pool A ===
Pos	Team	Pld	W	D	L	GF	GA	GD	Pts	Qualification
1	Pakistan	4	4	0	0	25	4	+21	12	Semi-finals
2	Bangladesh	4	3	0	1	24	8	+16	9	Semi-finals
3	China (H)	4	2	0	2	20	7	+13	6	Classification round
4	Sri Lanka	4	1	0	3	2	31	−29	3	Classification round
5	Hong Kong	4	0	0	4	0	21	−21	0	Classification round

Source: FIH
Rules for classification: 1) points; 2) matches won; 3) goal difference; 4) goals for; 5) head-to-head result; 6) field goals for.
(H) Hosts

03 July 2025
08:30

Bangladesh	3–0	Hong Kong
D. Islam 20', 26'; Hasan 43'	Report

Umpires:
Jang Yoonhyuk (KOR)
Muhamad Noor (MAS)

03 July 2025
19:30

China	9–0	Sri Lanka
Qiu 18', 24'; Liao. Y 29', 50'; Xuan 34'; Liao. J 35'; Chen 42', 57'; Lin 51'	Report

Umpires:
Chung Teng-Wei (TPE)
Elyor Kholmirzaev (UZB)

05 July 2025
17:30

Bangladesh	13–0	Sri Lanka
D. Islam 8', 22'; Hosen 9', 24', 46'; Abdullah 13', 17', 19', 57'; Ahmed 39'; Mehedi 54'; Sajed 57', 60'	Report

Umpires:
Jang Yoonhyuk (KOR)
Chung Teng-Wei (TPE)

05 July 2025
21:00

Pakistan	8–0	Hong Kong
Shahbaz 17', 43'; Awan 42', 47', 60'; Sohail 49'; Farooq 57', 60'	Report

Umpires:
Adilzhan Kudaibergen (KAZ)
Abdulaziz Abdulkhakimov (UZB)

06 July 2025
19:00

Pakistan	9–0	Sri Lanka
Awan 4'; Latif 5'; Haider 7', 17', 24'; Ali 13', 44'; Adeel 35', 42'	Report

Umpires:
Adilzhan Kudaibergen (KAZ)
Elyor Kholmirzaev (UZB)

06 July 2025
19:30

China	2–5	Bangladesh
Qiu 38', 53'	Report	Hosen 7', 43'; Ahmed 7'; J. Islam 39'; Hasan 45'

Umpires:
Muhamad Noor (MAS)
Abdulaziz Abdulkhakimov (UZB)

07 July 2025
17:30

Hong Kong	0–8	China
	Report	Lin 13', 17'; Liao. Y 15'; Hei 28'; Gao 41'; Qiu 45', 52'; Chen 58'

Umpires:
Muhamad Noor (MAS)
Chung Teng-Wei (TPE)

08 July 2025
08:00

Bangladesh	3–6	Pakistan
Hosen 15', 29'; D. Islam 28'	Report	Awan 3', 48'; Hanzala 19', 57'; Ali 23'; Haider 45'

Umpires:
Jang Yoonhyuk (KOR)
Hussain Al Hasani (OMA)

09 July 2025
08:00

Sri Lanka	2–0	Hong Kong
Mohamed 41'; Ragawan 47'	Report

Umpires:
Elyor Kholmirzaev (UZB)
Adilzhan Kudaibergen (KAZ)

09 July 2025
17:30

China	1–2	Pakistan
Lin 43'	Report	Shahbaz 11'; Hanzala 43'

Umpires:
You Hyosik (KOR)
Jang Yoonhyuk (KOR)

=== Pool B ===
Pos	Team	Pld	W	D	L	GF	GA	GD	Pts	Qualification
1	Japan	5	5	0	0	36	5	+31	15	Semi-finals
2	Malaysia	5	3	1	1	28	6	+22	10	Semi-finals
3	Uzbekistan	5	3	1	1	24	13	+11	10	Classification round
4	Indonesia	5	2	0	3	11	30	−19	6	Classification round
5	Chinese Taipei	5	1	0	4	13	30	−17	3	Classification round
6	Kazakhstan	5	0	0	5	4	32	−28	0	Classification round

Source: FIH
Rules for classification: 1) points; 2) matches won; 3) goal difference; 4) goals for; 5) head-to-head result; 6) field goals for.

03 July 2025
08:00

Japan	10–0	Indonesia
Yasui. T 2'; Yasui. K 16', 56'; Inukai 17', 37', 49'; Fujiwara 30'; Yoshioka 53'; Shimizu 59'; Shinkami 60'	Report

Umpires:
Hussain Al Hasani (OMA)
Rashed Hasan Rony (BAN)

03 July 2025
17:00

Chinese Taipei	2–8	Uzbekistan
Lo 17'; Chan 45'	Report	Tursunboev 9', 49'; Khudoynazarov 15', 26', 29'; Kakhramonov 19', 49'; Ruslanov 40'

Umpires:
Akalanka Ishan Kumara (SRI)
Mubashir Ali (PAK)

03 July 2025
19:00

Malaysia	4–0	Kazakhstan
Harieq 13'; Muniandy 27'; Faizo 42'; Azrul 47'	Report

Umpires:
You Hyosik (KOR)
Zhou Fuyi (CHN)

04 July 2025
17:30

Malaysia	10–0	Indonesia
Faizo 3', 20'; Safwan 24', 50', 60'; Mohd 25'; Azrul 27'; Abdul 44'; A Aferullsyah 47'; Rafiq 54'	Report

Umpires:
Hussain Al Hasani (OMA)
Su Boda (CHN)

04 July 2025
19:00

Japan	6–2	Uzbekistan
Toda 18'; Otsuji 27', 52'; Ueda 29'; Fujiwara 41'; Yasui. T 50'	Report	Rahmatullaev 9'; Saydullaev 53'

Umpires:
You Hyosik (KOR)
Yin Yongbo (CHN)

05 July 2025
08:00

Kazakhstan	2–6	Chinese Taipei
Aslanuly 7'; Nurmambet 58'	Report	Cai 11'; Wan 40', 44', 54'; Wei 51'; Lin 55'

Umpires:
Yin Yongbo (CHN)
Zhou Fuyi (CHN)

06 July 2025
08:00

Uzbekistan	7–2	Indonesia
Kakhramonov 2', 19'; Ortikboev 27', 60'; Khudoynazarov 34'; Ruslanov 42', 59'	Report	Wibowo 5', 30'

Umpires:
Rashed Hasan Rony (BAN)
Su Boda (CHN)

06 July 2025
08:30

Chinese Taipei	1–11	Malaysia
Lo 47'	Report	Safwan 1', 34'; M Muhammad 11', 39'; MD. Abdullah 30'; Harieq 36', 48'; Azrul 37'; Yahkip 44'; M Rahuul 51', 60'

Umpires:
Yin Yongbo (CHN)
Mubashir Ali (PAK)

06 July 2025
17:30

Kazakhstan	0–12	Japan
	Report	Sasaki. H 1'; Yoshioka 9', 23', 39'; Toda 11'; Yasui. T 15', 53'; Yasui. K 19'; Sasaki. R 41'; Ueda 50'; Shinkami 54'; Fujiwara 55'

Umpires:
Akalanka Ishan Kumara (SRI)
Zhou Fuyi (CHN)

07 July 2025
19:00

Japan	3–1	Malaysia
Toda 13', 54'; Fujiwara 58'	Report	Safwan 11'

Umpires:
You Hyosik (KOR)
Hussain Al Hasani (OMA)

08 July 2025
08:30

Uzbekistan	5–1	Kazakhstan
Rahmatullaev 9'; Khudoynazarov 17'; Husanov 20', 54'; Kakhramonov 43'	Report	Aukenov 8'

Umpires:
Su Boda (CHN)
Akalanka Ishan Kumara (SRI)

08 July 2025
17:30

Indonesia	4–2	Chinese Taipei
Wibowo 5', 27', 46'; Renyaan 57'	Report	Lo 3'; Cheng 21'

Umpires:
Rashed Hasan Rony (BAN)
Mubashir Ali (PAK)

09 July 2025
08:30

Chinese Taipei	2–5	Japan
Cai 4'; Lo 37'	Report	Shinkami 19'; Fujiwara 20', 25', 50'; Ueda 49'

Umpires:
Yin Yongbo (CHN)
Mubashir Ali (PAK)

09 July 2025
10:00

Malaysia	2–2	Uzbekistan
Azrul 35'; Rafiq 57'	Report	Khudoynazarov 34'; Rahmatullaev 51'

Umpires:
Zhou Fuyi (CHN)
Akalanka Ishan Kumara (SRI)

09 July 2025
17:00

Indonesia	5–1	Kazakhstan
Wibowo 12', 19', 35'; Ishak 18'; Akmal 38'	Report	Manatuly 52'

Umpires:
Su Boda (CHN)
Rashed Hasan Rony (BAN)

== Classification round ==
9–11th place semifinals
11 July
Hong Kong	2
Kazakhstan	7

Ninth place
12 July
Chinese Taipei	3
Kazakhstan	2

=== Ninth to Eleventh place crossover ===
11 July 2025
08:00

Hong Kong	2–7	Kazakhstan
Yue 5'; Lim 42'	Report	Aslanuly 7', 58', 60'; Aukenov 12'; Zhanat 24', 43', 50'

Umpires:
Muhamad Noor (MAS)
Su Boda (CHN)

=== Ninth place match ===
12 July 2025
08:00

Chinese Taipei	3–2	Kazakhstan
Wei 26'; Shi 30'; Chan 45'	Report	Nurmambet 8'; Zhanat 49'

Umpires:
Akalanka Ishan Kumara (SRI)
Zhou Fuyi (CHN)

=== Seventh place match ===
12 July 2025
19:15

Sri Lanka	1–3	Indonesia
Mohamed 11'	Report	Akmal 15'; Wibowo 38', 43'

Umpires:
Rashed Hasan Rony (BAN)
Abdulaziz Abdulkhakimov (UZB)

=== Fifth place match ===
12 July 2025
17:30

China	1–2	Uzbekistan
Lin 8'	Report	Ruslanov 28'; Husanov 58'

Umpires:
Muhamad Noor (MAS)
Chung Teng-Wei (TPE)

== Medal round ==
Semi-finals
11 July
Japan	6
Bangladesh	4
11 July
Pakistan (p.s.o.)	3 (4)
Malaysia	3 (3)

Final
13 July
Japan	3
Pakistan	0
Third place
13 July
Bangladesh	2
Malaysia	5

=== Semi finals ===
11 July 2025
17:00

Japan	6–4	Bangladesh
Fujiwara 18', 46', 60'; Toda 28'; Sasaki. R 51'; Otsuji 57'	Report	D. Islam 2'; Hosen 12'; Abdullah 30'; Hasan 47'

Umpires:
You Hyosik (KOR)
Yin Yongbo (CHN)

11 July 2025
17:30

Pakistan	3–3	Malaysia
Awan 5'; Shahbaz 8', 40'	Report	Safwan 10', 18', 28'
Penalties
Shaheer (penalty shoot-out scored); Latif (penalty shoot-out scored); Awan (penalty shoot-out scored); Hanzala (penalty shoot-out missed); Hamza (penalty shoot-out scored)	4–3	(penalty shoot-out scored) A Aferullsyah; (penalty shoot-out missed) M Muhammad; (penalty shoot-out scored) M Rahuul; (penalty shoot-out scored) M. Harieq; (penalty shoot-out missed) Azrul

Umpires:
Hussain Al Hasani (OMA)
Jang Yoonhyuk (KOR)

=== Third place match ===
13 July 2025
08:30

Bangladesh	2–5	Malaysia
Mehedi 10'; J. Islam 41'	Report	Abdul 6'; M Rahuul 41', 49'; Yahkip 50'; Mohd 60'

Umpires:
Jang Yoonhyuk (KOR)
Zhou Fuyi (CHN)

=== Final ===
13 July 2025
19:30

Japan	3–0	Pakistan
Fujiwara 23', 40'; Yasui. T 50'	Report

Umpires:
You Hyosik (KOR)
Hussain Al Hasani (OMA)

== Winners ==
2026 Men's Hockey U18 Asia Cup
(Japan)
Japan
1st title

== Awards ==
The following awards were given at the conclusion of the tournament:

Top scorer	Best player	Promising player	Best goalkeeper
(Japan) Fujiwara Yuma	(Malaysia) Iman Faizo	(Pakistan) Adeel	(Bangladesh) Mehedi Jinnat

== Statistics ==
=== Final standings ===
Pos	Team	Pld	W	D	L	GF	GA	GD	Pts	
1st place, gold medalist(s)	Japan	7	7	0	0	45	9	+36	21	Champions
2nd place, silver medalist(s)	Pakistan	6	4	1	1	28	10	+18	13	Runners up
3rd place, bronze medalist(s)	Malaysia	7	4	2	1	36	11	+25	14	3rd
4	Bangladesh	6	3	0	3	30	19	+11	9	4th
5	Uzbekistan	6	4	1	1	26	14	+12	13	Eliminated in group stage
6	China	5	2	0	3	21	9	+12	6	Eliminated in group stage
7	Indonesia	6	3	0	3	14	31	−17	9	Eliminated in group stage
8	Sri Lanka	5	1	0	4	3	34	−31	3	Eliminated in group stage
9	Chinese Taipei	6	2	0	4	16	32	−16	6	Eliminated in group stage
10	Kazakhstan	7	1	0	6	13	37	−24	3	Eliminated in group stage
11	Hong Kong	5	0	0	5	2	28	−26	0	Eliminated in group stage

Source: FIH

=== Goalscorers ===
There were 234 goals scored in 33 matches, for an average of 7.09 goals per match.

12 goals

- (Japan) Fujiwara Yuma

10 goals

- (Indonesia) Arthur Wibowo

9 goals

- (Malaysia) Muhammad Safwan

8 goals

- (Bangladesh) Ismail Hosen

7 goals

- (Pakistan) Abdullah Awan

6 goals

- (Bangladesh) Din Islam
- (Uzbekistan) Bunyodbek Khudoynazarov
- (China) Qiu Wenxuan

5 goals

- (Bangladesh) Md Abdullah
- (Uzbekistan) Shavkatjon Kakhramonov
- (China) Lin Jiaxing
- (Pakistan) Hassan Shahbaz
- (Japan) Toda Hiroki
- (Japan) Yasui Tatsuaki

4 goals

- (Kazakhstan) Mukhammed Aslanuly
- (Malaysia) Izz Ilhan Azrul
- (Pakistan) Asam Haider
- (Chinese Taipei) Lo Hao-Kai
- (Malaysia) M Rahuul
- (Uzbekistan) Abdulaziz Ruslanov
- (Japan) Yoshioka Mahiro
- (Kazakhstan) Arsen Zhanat

3 goals

- (Pakistan) Atif Ali
- (China) Chen Xingcai
- (Malaysia) Iman Faizo
- (Pakistan) Ali Hanzala
- (Bangladesh) Amit Hasan
- (Uzbekistan) Fozilbek Husanov
- (Japan) Inukai Yoga
- (China) Liao Yongtao
- (Malaysia) Mohd Harieq
- (Japan) Otsuji Koki
- (Uzbekistan) Nuriddinbek Rahmatullaev
- (Japan) Shinkami Aiki
- (Japan) Ueda Ryutaro
- (Chinese Taipei) Wan Wei-Zhe
- (Japan) Yasui Kengo

2 goals

- (Malaysia) Hisyamudin Abdul
- (Pakistan) Adeel
- (Bangladesh) Bishal Ahmed
- (Indonesia) Khaerulloh Akmal
- (Kazakhstan) Zhenis Aukenov
- (Chinese Taipei) Cai Youg-Zhi
- (Chinese Taipei) Chan Po-Hung
- (Pakistan) Muhammad Farooq
- (Bangladesh) Jony Islam
- (Malaysia) M Muhammad
- (Bangladesh) Md Mehedi
- (Sri Lanka) Arkam Mohamed
- (Malaysia) Saiful Syahfy Mohd
- (Malaysia) Rafiq Muhammad
- (Kazakhstan) Magzhan Nurmambet
- (Uzbekistan) Mironshokh Ortikboev
- (Bangladesh) Sajed Sajedul
- (Japan) Sasaki Ryushin
- (Uzbekistan) Akmaljon Tursunboev
- (Chinese Taipei) Wei Cheng-Ze
- (Malaysia) Abdul Yahkip

1 goal

- (Malaysia) A Aferullsyah
- (Malaysia) Abdullah Muhammad Danial
- (Chinese Taipei) Cheng Hung-Kai
- (China) Gao Peng
- (China) Hei Jiucili
- (Indonesia) Wahyu Ishak
- (Pakistan) Zubair Latif
- (China) Liao Jiayuan
- (Hong Kong) Lim Joshua Zhuo Shun
- (Chinese Taipei) Lin Yu-Hsiang
- (Kazakhstan) Rasul Manatuly
- (Malaysia) Thanesh Muniandy
- (Sri Lanka) Kogul Ragawan
- (Indonesia) Simon Renyaan
- (Japan) Sasaki Haruki
- (Uzbekistan) Fakhriddin Saydullaev
- (Chinese Taipei) Shi Bo-Hao
- (Japan) Shimizu Chihiro
- (Pakistan) Amir Sohail
- (China) Xuan Bolang
- (Hong Kong) Yue Pui Him

Source: FIH

== See also ==
- 2025 Women's Hockey U18 Asia Cup
- 2025 Men's Hockey Asia Cup
