= 2025 Women's Hockey U18 Asia Cup =

Asian field hockey tournament

Tournament details
- Host country: China
- City: Dazhou
- Dates: 3–13 July
- Teams: 8 (from 1 confederation)
- Venue: Dazhou National Hockey Training Centre

Final positions
- Champions: Japan (2nd title)
- Runner-up: China
- Third place: Bangladesh

Tournament statistics
- Matches played: 24
- Goals scored: 157 (6.54 per match)
- Top scorer: (Japan) Nene Fujii (10 goals)
- Best player: (China) Guo Jiaxin
- Best young player: (Bangladesh) Airin Riya
- Best goalkeeper: (Kazakhstan) Aruzhan Ospanova

The 2025 Women's Hockey U18 Asia Cup was the fifth edition of the women's Hockey U18 Asia Cup. A total of eight Asian girls' national teams contested, organized by the Asian Hockey Federation. The tournament was held in Dazhou, China from 3rd to 13th July 2025, alongside the boy's tournament. The tournament was held nine years after the previous edition, which took place in 2016. Japan won the gold for the second time after beating the defending champions China by 1–0 in the final and Bangladesh, the debutants, claimed their first bronze, defeating Kazakhstan.

All matches were livestreamed on the Asian Hockey Federation's official Facebook and YouTube channels.

== Venue ==
It was the first time Dazhou hosted any international field hockey competition.

(China) Dazhou
Dazhou National Hockey Training Centre
Capacity: 1,050

== Teams ==
Bangladesh

Head Coach: (Bangladesh) Zahid Hossain

1. Mst Khatun(GK)
2. Prionti Oishi
3. Lonima Nupur
4. Mst Annika
5. Shosty Roy
6. Sanjida Moni
7. Ninisen Rakhain
8. Tasfiha Tisha
9. Dhanuching Marma
10. Riyasha Rishi
11. Sharika Rimon(C)
12. Airin Riya
13. Mst Lima
14. Mst Khatun
15. Kona Akter
16. Nadira Ema
17. Mst Akter
18. Mst Alpona(GK)
China

Head Coach: (China) Guo Jie

4. Yu Wanxin
5. Zhang Xinyi
6. Zhao Yu
7. Wang Xinling
10. Yang Xinyu
11. Guo Jiaxin
12. Wang Enting
13. Ge Chen
15. Luo Yaxi
17. Feng Jiaxin
18. Yuan Xuni
19. Luo Le
20. Zhang Mengjie
21. Sun Hongyan
22. Zeng Kexin
23. Ma Ting
25. Tang Kexin
28. Zhang Yuzheng(C)
30. Liu Xue(GK)
31. Chen Zhangmengzhi(GK)
Chinese Taipei

Head Coach: (Chinese Taipei) Lin Min Nan

1. Ohoyi Tefi(GK)
2. Chiang Chih-Tung
3. Wang Wen-Tsen
5. Ye Shu-Qin
6. Chen Xiao-Qing
7. Huang Ling-Hu(C)
8. Wang Shih-Han
9. Su Hung-Chun
10. Li Yi-Hsuan
11. Huang Yi-Chen
12. Lin Ya-Wen
13. Wu Fang-Chi
14. Tsou Yu-Min
15. Chiang Xin-Pei
16. Su Pin-Chiao
17. Chang Chih-Hsien
18. Lin Rou-Jing(GK)
19. Yu Sih-Ying
Hong Kong

Head Coach: (Hong Kong) Pui Sze Lau

1. Shina Tamaki
2. Ameera Khera Mohammed
3. Cheng Shu Sian
4. Kinya Tsoi
5. Seraphina Bernice Nissen
7. Lee Bo Ting Jasmine
9. Hoi Ching Hebe Tsui
10. Wing Tung Hayley Chan(C)
11. Sum Yu Charlotte Wong
12. Elena Lian
13. Wun Yung Chloe Lam
14. Hei Ching Kyra Tsang
15. Chi Shun Constance Kwok
16. Li Sze Ting(GK)
18. Tina Tianna Gan(GK)
19. Natisa Maria Theil
20. Emily Chow
21. Lam Wun Hei
Japan

Head Coach: (Japan) Naoya Iwadate

1. Riku Kurihara(GK)
2. Noera Mori(GK)
3. Mone Narita(C)
4. Hinano Kimura
5. Kurumi Yoshida
6. Miyabi Horie
7. Yuna Akiba
8. Hana Maruyama
9. Rin Washizu
10. Nana Hashimoto
11. Yuzuki Togawa
12. Hana Nishida
13. Renka Tetsuka
14. Juri Ishihara
15. Rina Tamura
16. Nene Fujii
17. Sayo Koike
18. Rina Yamamoto
Kazakhstan

Head Coach: (Kazakhstan) Daulet Urmanov

2. Gazy Oral
3. Dilnaz Nigmetzhanova
6. Yerkezhan Suleimen
7. Zhanar Bektemissova
9. Dariya Kozhakhmetova
10. Zhansaya Amangeldi
11. Aruzhan Khamit
12. Ayanat Mazhim
14. Akzhan Yersultan
15. Togzhan Abdrakhman
16. Aruzhan Ospanova(C, GK)
17. Khaua Yeskendіr
19. Uilbossyn Zhetkergenova
20. Saltanat Maratova
21. Zarina Ibrayeva
22. Yasmin Seitzhan
23. Gaukhar Aslankyzy
25. Aruzhan Bolatbek
32. Ayaulym Rakhym(GK)
Sri Lanka

Head Coach: (Sri Lanka) Ajith Godigamuwa

1. Sakunika Vihare(GK)
2. Sanaya Hakmana(GK)
3. Nehara Wijesooriya
4. Dihini Bamunusinghe
5. Tharushika Subasinghe
6. Rashini Wijekoon
7. Hennayake Bandara
8. Sithuni Peiris
9. Maika Tennekoon
10. Korale Jayasinghe
11. Vinuri Nanayakkara
12. Nesadi Samarakoon(C)
13. Tharindi Liyanagunawardhana
14. Tharuli Kalansuriya
15. Keshani Perera
16. Divyanjali Kurukulasuriya
17. Janudi Geeganage
18. Lasheni Samarakoon
Uzbekistan

Head Coach: (Uzbekistan) Pavel Habryneuski

1. Rushana Chorieva(GK)
2. Ugiloy Fakhriddinova
3. Sevinch Mirzaeva(C)
4. Shakhlokhon Kuziboeva
5. Noilakhon Olimova
6. Ziyoda Rajabboeva
7. Shakhzoda Zaripova
8. Dinora Otanazarova
9. Fotima Abduganieva
10. Khumora Ulmasova
11. Dilafruz Abdullaeva
12. Madinabonu Khujaeva
13. Norgul Iskandarova
14. Roza Khasanova
15. Janon Ilhomova
16. Marjona Mamatmurodova
17. Mekhrangiz Abdugaforova
21. Zulkhumorkhon Ibrohimova(GK)

== Preliminary round ==
All times are local (UTC+8).

=== Pool A ===
Pos	Team	Pld	W	D	L	GF	GA	GD	Pts	Qualification
1	Japan	3	3	0	0	43	0	+43	9	Top 4 Pool
2	Bangladesh	3	2	0	1	6	11	−5	6	Top 4 Pool
3	Uzbekistan	3	1	0	2	3	16	−13	3	Classification round
4	Hong Kong	3	0	0	3	1	26	−25	0	Classification round

Source: FIH
Rules for classification: 1) points; 2) matches won; 3) goal difference; 4) goals for; 5) head-to-head result; 6) field goals for.

3 July 2025
10:00

Hong Kong	1–3	Uzbekistan
Mohammed 8'	Report	Abdugaforova 23'; Khujaeva 40'; Zaripova 41'

Umpires:
Binish Hayat (PAK)
Chamini Gunawardhana (SRI)

4 July 2025
08:00

Japan	11–0	Bangladesh
Tamura 10', 51', 57', 59'; Koike 23', 54'; Fujii 30', 59'; Tetsuka 45', 55'; Yamamoto 52'	Report

Umpires:
Li Lulu (CHN)
Yu Tian (CHN)

5 July 2025
08:30

Hong Kong	0–20	Japan
	Report	Tetsuka 8', 24', 34'; Ishihara 12'; Koike 13', 53', 55'; Tamura 18'; Fujii 20', 30'; Yamamoto 27', 51', 55'; Hashimoto 31'; Yoshida 45', 54', 59'; Narita 52'; Nishida 58'; Togawa 59'

Umpires:
Mitra Syumanja (INA)
Jang Heesun (KOR)

5 July 2025
17:00

Bangladesh	3–0	Uzbekistan
Riya 28'; K. Akter 30', 30'	Report

Umpires:
Qiu Fang (CHN)
Wang Xinjie (CHN)

7 July 2025
08:00

Japan	12–0	Uzbekistan
Yoshida 4', 43'; Tetsuka 5', 26'; Yamamoto 22'; Koike 32', 44', 55'; Fujii 40'; Hashimoto 43'; Kimura 49'; Togawa 60'	Report

Umpires:
Li Lulu (CHN)
Liu Yu-Chen (TPE)

7 July 2025
17:00

Bangladesh	3–0	Hong Kong
K. Akter 34'; Riya 42'; Rimon 57'	Report

Umpires:
Zarina Ilyassova (KAZ)
Mitra Syumanja (INA)

=== Pool B ===
Pos	Team	Pld	W	D	L	GF	GA	GD	Pts	Qualification
1	China (H)	3	3	0	0	35	0	+35	9	Top 4 Pool
2	Kazakhstan	3	2	0	1	7	12	−5	6	Top 4 Pool
3	Chinese Taipei	3	1	0	2	4	16	−12	3	Classification round
4	Sri Lanka	3	0	0	3	0	18	−18	0	Classification round

Source: FIH
Rules for classification: 1) points; 2) matches won; 3) goal difference; 4) goals for; 5) head-to-head result; 6) field goals for.
(H) Hosts

3 July 2025
17:30

Chinese Taipei	1–5	Kazakhstan
H. Ling-Hu 10'	Report	Seiitzhan 33'; Yeskendir 37'; Bektemissova 42'; Suleiman 49'; Mazhim 59'

Umpires:
Jang Heesun (KOR)
Mitra Syumanja (INA)

4 July 2025
19:30

China	13–0	Sri Lanka
Guo 4', 9', 21'; Feng 9', 11'; Zeng 24', 28', 30', 34'; Luo 26'; Yuan 29', 54'; Tang 59'	Report

Umpires:
Keme Karmoker (BAN)
Zarina Ilyassova (KAZ)

5 July 2025
19:00

Sri Lanka	0–2	Kazakhstan
	Report	Bektemissova 30'; Amangeldi 34'

Umpires:
Liu Yu-Chen (TPE)
Yu Tian (CHN)

5 July 2025
19:30

Chinese Taipei	0–11	China
	Report	Guo 2', 14'; Yang 6', 36'; Luo 7'; Feng 22', 23', 29'; Zeng 37'; Tang 47'; Zhang 49'

Umpires:
Binish Hayat (PAK)
Chamini Gunawardhana (SRI)

7 July 2025
08:30

Sri Lanka	0–3	Chinese Taipei
	Report	Lin 21'; Chang 37'; Li 54'

Umpires:
Keme Karmoker (BAN)
Qiu Fang (CHN)

7 July 2025
19:30

China	11–0	Kazakhstan
Guo 7', 13'; Zhang. X 25'; Luo 26'; Zeng 34', 60'; Feng 36'; Wang 40', 51'; Zhang 47'; Tang 55'	Report

Umpires:
Jang Heesun (KOR)
Binish Hayat (PAK)

== Top 4 Pool ==
Pos	Team	Pld	W	D	L	GF	GA	GD	Pts	Qualification
1	Japan	3	2	1	0	26	2	+24	7	Final
2	China (H)	3	2	1	0	22	2	+20	7	Final
3	Bangladesh	3	0	1	2	2	22	−20	1	Third place match
4	Kazakhstan	3	0	1	2	2	26	−24	1	Third place match

Source: FIH
Rules for classification: 1) points; 2) matches won; 3) goal difference; 4) goals for; 5) head-to-head result; 6) field goals for.
(H) Hosts

9 July 2025
19:00

Japan	13–0	Kazakhstan
Hashimoto 1'; Fujii 11', 21', 40', 49', 59'; Yamamoto 14', 25'; Tamura 16', 46'; Kimura 42'; Tetsuka 42', 44'	Report

Umpires:
Qiu Fang (CHN)
Li Lulu (CHN)

9 July 2025
19:30

China	9–0	Bangladesh
Feng 10', 36'; Yuan 14'; Zeng 29'; Zhang 30', 39', 41'; Wang 55'; Guo 57'	Report

Umpires:
Mitra Syumanja (INA)
Jang Heesun (KOR)

11 July 2025
19:15

Kazakhstan	2–2	Bangladesh
Amangeldi 8'; Suleiman 60'	Report	Tisha 30'; Rimon 33'

Umpires:
Qiu Fang (CHN)
Jang Heesun (KOR)

11 July 2025
19:45

China	2–2	Japan
Guo 10'; Luo 57'	Report	Yamamoto 11'; Washizu 60'

Umpires:
Zarina Ilyassova (KAZ)
Binish Hayat (PAK)

== Classification round ==
Pos	Team	Pld	W	D	L	GF	GA	GD	Pts	Qualification
1	Chinese Taipei	3	2	1	0	7	2	+5	7	Fifth place match
2	Uzbekistan	3	2	1	0	6	3	+3	7	Fifth place match
3	Hong Kong	3	1	0	2	3	6	−3	3	Seventh place match
4	Sri Lanka	3	0	0	3	1	6	−5	0	Seventh place match

Source: FIH
Rules for classification: 1) points; 2) matches won; 3) goal difference; 4) goals for; 5) head-to-head result; 6) field goals for.

8 July 2025
19:00

Uzbekistan	2–1	Sri Lanka
Abdugaforova 15'; Kuziboeva 59'	Report	Samarakoon 49'

Umpires:
Wang Xinjie (CHN)
Yu Tian (CHN)

8 July 2025
19:30

Chinese Taipei	3–1	Hong Kong
H. Yi-Chen 9'; H. Ling-Hu 15'; Ye 30+'	Report	Tamaki 5'

Umpires:
Zarina Ilyassova (KAZ)
Binish Hayat (PAK)

10 July 2025
17:30

Sri Lanka	0–1	Hong Kong
	Report	Lee 19'

Umpires:
Zarina Ilyassova (KAZ)
Liu Yu-Chen (TPE)

10 July 2025
19:30

Chinese Taipei	1–1	Uzbekistan
Chang 33'	Report	Zaripova 47'

Umpires:
Li Lulu (CHN)
Yu Tian (CHN)

=== Seventh place match ===
12 July 2025
17:00

Hong Kong	0–1	Sri Lanka
	Report	Subasinghe 53'

Umpires:
Mitra Syumanja (INA)
Liu Yu-Chen (TPE)

=== Fifth place match ===
12 July 2025
19:45

Chinese Taipei	4–4	Uzbekistan
Li 2'; Chiang 37', 39'; Ye 55'	Report	Khujaeva 6', 56'; Mirzaeva 30'; Zaripova 59'
Penalties
Chang (penalty shoot-out scored); Ye (penalty shoot-out missed); Wang (penalty shoot-out missed); Lin (penalty shoot-out missed)	1–3	(penalty shoot-out scored) Khujaeva; (penalty shoot-out missed) Abduganieva; (penalty shoot-out scored) Zaripova; (penalty shoot-out scored) Fakhriddinova

Umpires:
Zarina Ilyassova (KAZ)
Li Lulu (CHN)

== Third place match ==
13 July 2025
08:00

Bangladesh	6–2	Kazakhstan
Riya 12', 18', 20'; Rimon 35'; K. Akter 50'; Rishi 53'	Report	Amangeldi 9'; Bektemissova 59'

Umpires:
Qiu Fang (CHN)
Yu Tian (CHN)

== Final ==
13 July 2025
17:00

Japan	1–0	China
Yoshida 26'	Report

Umpires:
Binish Hayat (PAK)
Jang Heesun (KOR)

== Winners ==
2026 Women's Hockey U18 Asia Cup
(Japan)
Japan
2nd title

== Awards ==
The following awards were given at the conclusion of the tournament:

Top scorer	Best player	Promising player	Best goalkeeper
(Japan) Nene Fujii	(China) Guo Jiaxin	(Bangladesh) Airin Riya	(Kazakhstan) Aruzhan Ospanova

== Statistics ==
=== Final standings ===
Pos	Team	Pld	W	D	L	GF	GA	GD	Pts	
1st place, gold medalist(s)	Japan	6	5	1	0	59	2	+57	16	Champions
2nd place, silver medalist(s)	China	6	4	1	1	46	3	+43	13	Runners up
3rd place, bronze medalist(s)	Bangladesh	6	3	1	2	14	24	−10	10	3rd
4	Kazakhstan	6	2	1	3	11	33	−22	7	4th
5	Uzbekistan	6	2	2	2	10	22	−12	8	
6	Chinese Taipei	6	2	2	2	12	22	−10	8	
7	Sri Lanka	6	1	0	5	2	21	−19	3	
8	Hong Kong	6	1	0	5	3	30	−27	3	

Source: FIH

=== Goalscorers ===
There were 157 goals scored in 24 matches, for an average of 6.54 goals per match.

10 goals

- (Japan) Nene Fujii

9 goals

- (China) Guo Jiaxin
- (Japan) Renka Tetsuka

8 goals

- (China) Feng Jiaxin
- (China) Zeng Kexin
- (Japan) Sayo Koike
- (Japan) Rina Yamamoto

7 goals

- (Japan) Rina Tamura

6 goals

- (Japan) Kurumi Yoshida

5 goals

- (Bangladesh) Airin Riya
- (China) Zhang Yuzheng

4 goals

- (Bangladesh) Kona Akter
- (China) Luo Yaxi

3 goals

- (Bangladesh) Sharika Rimon
- (China) Tang Kexin
- (China) Wang Xinling
- (China) Yuan Xuni
- (Japan) Nana Hashimoto
- (Kazakhstan) Zhansaya Amangeldi
- (Kazakhstan) Zhanar Bektemissova
- (Uzbekistan) Madinabonu Khujaeva
- (Uzbekistan) Shakhzoda Zaripova

2 goals

- (China) Yang Xinyu
- (Chinese Taipei) Chang Chih-Hsien
- (Chinese Taipei) Chiang Xin-Pei
- (Chinese Taipei) Huang Ling-Hu
- (Chinese Taipei) Li Yi-Hsuan
- (Chinese Taipei) Ye Shu-Qin
- (Japan) Hinano Kimura
- (Japan) Yuzuki Togawa
- (Kazakhstan) Yerkezhan Suleiman
- (Uzbekistan) Mekhrangiz Abdugaforova

1 goal

- (Bangladesh) Riyasha Rishi
- (Bangladesh) Tasfiha Tisha
- (China) Zhang Xinyi
- (Chinese Taipei) Huang Yi-Chen
- (Chinese Taipei) Lin Ya-Wen
- (Hong Kong) Lee Bo Ting Jasmine
- (Hong Kong) Ameera Khera Mohammed
- (Hong Kong) Shina Tamaki
- (Japan) Juri Ishihara
- (Japan) Mone Narita
- (Japan) Hana Nishida
- (Japan) Rin Washizu
- (Kazakhstan) Ayanat Mazhim
- (Kazakhstan) Yasmin Seiitzhan
- (Kazakhstan) Khaua Yeskendir
- (Sri Lanka) Nesadi Samarakoon
- (Sri Lanka) Tharushika Subasinghe
- (Uzbekistan) Shakhlokhon Kuziboeva
- (Uzbekistan) Sevinch Mirzaeva

Source: FIH

== See also ==
- 2025 Men's Hockey U18 Asia Cup
- 2025 Women's Hockey Asia Cup
