= Ajeet Yadav =

Indian field hockey player

Personal information
- Full name: Ajeet Yadav
- Born: 31 October 2008 (age 18) Ghazipur, Uttar Pradesh, India

Sport
- Sport: Field hockey
- Position: Forward
Senior career
Years	Team	Caps	Goals
2023–	Hockey Uttar Pradesh	15	6
2024–	Sai Shakti	4	4
National team
Years	Team	Caps	Goals
2025–	India U21	18	(9)
Medal record
Men's field hockey
Representing India
Junior World Cup
Bronze medal – third place	2025 Tamilnadu
Junior Asia Cup
Gold medal – first place	2026 Moqi

Ajeet Yadav (born 31 October 2008) is an Indian field hockey player from Uttar Pradesh, representing Indian junior team as a forward.

== Early life ==
Ajeet Yadav hails from Ghazipur in Uttar Pradesh. His early training took place at Meghbaran Stadium in Karampur village.

== Career ==
Ajeet was called for Indian Junior team in the 4 Nations tournament in 2025 and scored one against Australia in the last match. He took part in the 2025 Sultan of Johor Cup.

Ajeet scored three goals at the 2025 Junior World Cup, against Chile and Oman. He was adjudged as the Player of the Match against South Korea in a group fixture at the 2026 Junior Asia Cup. He scored 6 goals in the tournament.

Ajeet played for the senior Indian squad in the Centenary hockey series against New Zealand in 2026.
