= 2026 Men's Junior AHF Cup =

Men's field hockey tournament in Asia

Tournament details
- Host country: Kazakhstan
- Dates: 23 June – 1 July 2026
- Teams: 8 (from 1 confederation)
- Venue: Taldykorgan Hockey Stadium

Final positions
- Champions: South Korea (1st title)
- Runner-up: Uzbekistan
- Third place: Kazakhstan

Tournament statistics
- Matches played: 24
- Goals scored: 158 (6.58 per match)
- Top scorer(s): (South Korea) Lee Minhyeok (Indonesia) Arthur Wibowo (20 goals)
- Best young player: (Uzbekistan) Fozilbek Husanov
- Best goalkeeper: (Kazakhstan) Abylay Khamit

The 2026 Men's Junior AHF Cup was the eighth edition of the Men's Junior AHF Cup, the biennial qualification tournament for the Men's Hockey Junior Asia Cup, organized by the Asian Hockey Federation. The tournament was held in Taldykorgan, from 23 June to 1 July 2026.

Bangladesh were the defending champions. South Korea clinched their first title by defeating Uzbekistan in the final.

Sri Lanka are the only team to participate in all eight editions of the tournament. They were eliminated in the quarter final, losing to Kazakhstan.

== Venue ==
(Kazakhstan) Taldykorgan
Taldykorgan Hockey Stadium

== Preliminary round ==
All times are in (UTC+5)

=== Pool A ===
Pos	Team	Pld	W	D	L	GF	GA	GD	Pts	Qualification
1	South Korea	3	3	0	0	31	0	+31	9	Quarter-finals
2	Indonesia	3	2	0	1	18	6	+12	6	Quarter-finals
3	Sri Lanka	3	1	0	2	10	9	+1	3	Quarter-finals
4	Tajikistan	3	0	0	3	0	44	−44	0	Quarter-finals

Source: FIH
Rules for classification: 1) points; 2) matches won; 3) goal difference; 4) goals for; 5) head-to-head result; 6) field goals for.

23 June 2026
14:00

South Korea	6–0	Indonesia
Kang 3', 36'; Choi. J 38'; Sim 41'; Park 50'; Moon 58'	Report

Umpires:
Tianhe Ren (CHN)
Zarina Ilyassova (KAZ)

23 June 2026
16:00

Sri Lanka	10–0	Tajikistan
Mohamed 2', 13', 37', 41', 52'; Domawalage 27', 40'; Pathirana 39'; Yakdehige 54'; Oyagawa 58'	Report

Umpires:
Kim Jiyong (KOR)
Adilzhan Kudaibergen (KAZ)

24 June 2026
14:00

Indonesia	15–0	Tajikistan
Wibowo 4', 33', 36', 38', 45+', 54', 55', 58', 58'; Al Muroqi 5', 6'; Akmal 18', 44'; Ishak 29'; Mutaqin 54'	Report

Umpires:
Naser Samadi (IRI)
Zarina Ilyassova (KAZ)

24 June 2026
16:00

Sri Lanka	0–6	South Korea
	Report	Park 11'; Dany 18'; Yoo 23'; Choi. D 37', 44'; Lee 38'

Umpires:
Elyor Kholmirzaev (UZB)
Adilzhan Kudaibergen (KAZ)

26 June 2026
14:00

South Korea	19–0	Tajikistan
Lee 1', 2', 3', 13', 15', 17', 23', 24', 30', 34', 50'; Kyung 6', 20'; Choi. J 17'; Choi. D 38', 40', 52', 55', 59'	Report

Umpires:
Zarina Ilyassova (KAZ)
Elyor Kholmirzaev (UZB)

26 June 2026
16:00

Indonesia	3–0	Sri Lanka
Dwinanda 23'; Wibowo 28'; Ramadhan 43'	Report

Umpires:
Adilzhan Kudaibergen (KAZ)
Naser Samadi (IRI)

=== Pool B ===
Pos	Team	Pld	W	D	L	GF	GA	GD	Pts	Qualification
1	Uzbekistan	3	2	1	0	14	1	+13	7	Quarter-finals
2	Kazakhstan (H)	3	1	2	0	5	1	+4	5	Quarter-finals
3	Thailand	3	1	1	1	1	4	−3	4	Quarter-finals
4	Iran	3	0	0	3	0	14	−14	0	Quarter-finals

Source: FIH
Rules for classification: 1) points; 2) matches won; 3) goal difference; 4) goals for; 5) head-to-head result; 6) field goals for.
(H) Hosts

23 June 2026
18:00

Thailand	1–0	Iran
Sae-aew 45'	Report

Umpires:
Mahmood Al Hasani (OMA)
Elyor Kholmirzaev (UZB)

23 June 2026
20:00

Uzbekistan	1–1	Kazakhstan
Zhanat 11'	Report	Saydullaev 20'

Umpires:
Yaser Khurshid (PAK)
Naser Samadi (IRI)

24 June 2026
18:00

Iran	0–4	Kazakhstan
	Report	Aslanuly 14', 30'; Shavkatov 37'; Dautaliyev 52'

Umpires:
Tianhe Ren (CHN)
Yaser Khurshid (PAK)

24 June 2026
20:00

Uzbekistan	4–0	Thailand
Kakhramonov 33', 60'; Sotlikov 39'; Nazirov 52'	Report

Umpires:
Kim Jiyong (KOR)
Mahmood Al Hasani (OMA)

26 June 2026
18:00

Iran	0–9	Uzbekistan
	Report	Nazirov 17', 19'; Yuldashev 26'; Kakhramonov 28'; Khudoynazarov 40'; Saydullaev 48', 55'; Ortikboev 54'; Mirgoziev 59'

Umpires:
Yaser Khurshid (PAK)
Kim Jiyong (KOR)

26 June 2026
20:00

Thailand	0–0	Kazakhstan
	Report

Umpires:
Tianhe Ren (CHN)
Mahmood Al Hasani (OMA)

== Knockout stage ==
=== Bracket ===
Quarter-finals
27 June
South Korea	16
Iran	1
27 June
Kazakhstan	2
Sri Lanka	1
27 June
Uzbekistan	10
Tajikistan	0
27 June
Indonesia	1
Thailand	3

Semi-finals
29 June
South Korea	4
Kazakhstan	0
29 June
Uzbekistan	4
Thailand	0

Final
1 July
South Korea	5
Uzbekistan	3
Third place
1 July
Kazakhstan	3
Thailand	0

=== Quarter-finals ===
27 June 2026
13:00

South Korea	16–1	Iran
Choi. D 5', 12', 20', 24', 30', 35', 40', 42'; Lee 14', 57', 58'; Park. J 26'; Yu 49'; Park. S 55'; Yoo 59'; Moon 60'	Report	taghitash 43'

Umpires:
Tianhe Ren (CHN)
Mahmood Al Hasani (OMA)

27 June 2026
15:15

Indonesia	1–3	Thailand
Wibowo 12'	Report	Boonsri 8', 27'; Sae-aew 52'

Umpires:
Yaser Khurshid (PAK)
Adilzhan Kudaibergen (KAZ)

27 June 2026
17:30

Uzbekistan	10–0	Tajikistan
Yuldashev 1', 3', 33'; Ruslanov 11', 39'; Kakhramonov 27'; Khudoynazarov 29'; Tursunboev 38'; Nazirov 52'; Sotlikov 59'	Report

Umpires:
Zarina Ilyassova (KAZ)
Naser Samadi (IRI)

27 June 2026
19:45

Kazakhstan	2–1	Sri Lanka
Zhanat 23'; Kairatuly 32'	Report	Pathirana 60'

Umpires:
Kim Jiyong (KOR)
Elyor Kholmirzaev (UZB)

=== Fifth to eighth place classification ===
Cross-overs
29 June
Iran	1
Sri Lanka	5
29 June
Indonesia	11
Tajikistan	0

Fifth place
1 July
Sri Lanka	2
Indonesia	4
Seventh place
1 July
Iran	3
Tajikistan	0

==== Cross-overs ====
29 June 2026
13:00

Iran	1–5	Sri Lanka
Salimi 48'	Report	Udawaththe 5', 39'; Pathirana 14', 21'; Yakdehige 30'

Umpires:
Zarina Ilyassova (KAZ)
Elyor Kholmirzaev (UZB)

29 June 2026
15:15

Indonesia	11–0	Tajikistan
Wibowo 8', 22', 33', 37', 49', 50', 52'; Akmal 28', 33'; Dwinanda 30' inosensius 35'	Report

Umpires:
Adilzhan Kudaibergen (KAZ)
Naser Samadi (IRI)

==== Seventh and eighth place ====
1 July 2026
13:00

Iran	3–0	Tajikistan
ashkan 39' khalaji 53'; Salimi 56'	Report

Umpires:
Elyor Kholmirzaev (UZB)
Adilzhan Kudaibergen (KAZ)

==== Fifth and sixth place ====
1 July 2026
15:15

Sri Lanka	2–4	Indonesia
Udawaththe 43'; Domawalage 57'	Report	Wibowo 12', 53'; Al Muroqi 29'; Ramadhan 50'

Umpires:
Naser Samadi (IRI)
Zarina Ilyassova (KAZ)

=== First to fourth place classification ===
==== Semi-finals ====
29 June 2026
17:30

South Korea	4–0	Kazakhstan
Yoo 3'; Yu 9'; Lee 30+'; Kwon 49'	Report

Umpires:
Yaser Khurshid (PAK)
Tianhe Ren (CHN)

29 June 2026
19:45

Uzbekistan	4–0	Thailand
Nazirov 18'; Asliddinov 29'; Husanov 37'; Saydullaev 43'	Report

Umpires:
Kim Jiyong (KOR)
Mahmood Al Hasani (OMA)

==== Third and fourth place ====
1 July 2026
17:30

Kazakhstan	3–0	Thailand
Shavkatov 6'; Aslanuly 8'; Toktar 21'	Report

Umpires:
Kim Jiyong (KOR)
Tianhe Ren (CHN)

==== Final ====
1 July 2026
19:45

South Korea	5–3	Uzbekistan
Lee 4', 28', 30', 57'; Yoo 4'	Report	Abdurakhmonov 35'; Saydullaev 57', 60'

Umpires:
Mahmood Al Hasani (OMA)
Yaser Khurshid (PAK)

== Final standings ==
Pos	Team	Qualification
1st place, gold medalist(s)	South Korea	2026 Junior Asia Cup
2nd place, silver medalist(s)	Uzbekistan	
3rd place, bronze medalist(s)	Kazakhstan	2026 Junior Asia Cup
4	Thailand	
5	Indonesia	2026 Junior Asia Cup
6	Sri Lanka	
7	Iran	
8	Tajikistan	

Source: FIH

== Goalscorers ==
There were 158 goals scored in 24 matches, for an average of 6.58 goals per match.

20 goals

- (South Korea) Lee Minhyeok
- (Indonesia) Arthur Wibowo

15 goals

- (South Korea) Choi Dohyeon

11 goals

- (Indonesia) Arthur Wibowo

6 goals

- (Uzbekistan) Fakhriddin Saydullaev

5 goals

- (Sri Lanka) Arkam Mohamed
- (Uzbekistan) Ruzimukhammad Nazirov

4 goals

- (Indonesia) Khaerulloh Akmal
- (Uzbekistan) Shavkatjon Kakhramonov
- (Sri Lanka) Nethmina Pathirana
- (South Korea) Yoo Hyoguk
- (Uzbekistan) Nodirbek Yuldashev

3 goals

- (Indonesia) Mohamad Al Muroqi
- (Kazakhstan) Mukhammed Aslanuly
- (Sri Lanka) Shenal Domawalage
- (Sri Lanka) Kavindu Udawaththe

2 goals

- (Thailand) Kankawee Boonsri
- (South Korea) Choi Junghee
- (Indonesia) Septian Dwinanda
- (South Korea) Kang Taewook
- (Uzbekistan) Bunyodbek Khudoynazarov
- (South Korea) Kyung Minjun
- (South Korea) Moon Uijoon
- (South Korea) Park Jaewon
- (South Korea) Park Seowon
- (Indonesia) Devo Ramadhan
- (Uzbekistan) Abdulaziz Ruslanov
- (Thailand) Jiranat Sae-aew
- (Iran) Mahdi Salimi
- (Kazakhstan) Suleiman Shavkatov
- (Uzbekistan) Doston Sotlikov
- (Sri Lanka) Dishon Yakdehige
- (South Korea) Yu Seungchul
- (Kazakhstan) Arsen Zhanat

1 goal

- (Uzbekistan) Bakhodirjon Abdurakhmonov
- (Uzbekistan) Asadbek Asliddinov
- (Kazakhstan) Arnur Dautaliyev
- (Uzbekistan) Fozilbek Husanov
- (Indonesia) atfen inosensius
- (Indonesia) Wahyu Ishak
- (Kazakhstan) Yerali Kairatuly
- (Iran) amirreza khalaji
- (South Korea) Kwon Yechan
- (Uzbekistan) Mirjalol Mirgoziev
- (Indonesia) Iqmal Mutaqin
- (Uzbekistan) Mironshokh Ortikboev
- (Sri Lanka) Weerasooriya Oyagawa
- (South Korea) Sim Hyeonu
- (South Korea) Sung Dany
- (Iran) taghitash alireza
- (Kazakhstan) Bauyrzhan Toktar
- (Uzbekistan) Akmaljon Tursunboev
- (Iran) ashkan zolfagharkhanian

Source: FIH

== See also ==
- 2026 Women's Junior AHF Cup
