= 2026 Men's Hockey Junior Asia Cup =

Field hockey competition in Asia

Tournament details
- Host country: China
- City: Moqi
- Dates: 4 – 13 September
- Teams: 10 (from 1 confederation)
- Venue: Moqi Training Base

Final positions
- Champions: India (6th title)
- Runner-up: South Korea
- Third place: Pakistan

Tournament statistics
- Matches played: 29
- Goals scored: 212 (7.31 per match)
- Top scorer: (India) Anmol Ekka (17 goals)
- Best player: (South Korea) Lee Minhyeok
- Best young player: (Pakistan) Waleed Rana
- Best goalkeeper: (India) Vivek Lakra

The 2026 Men's Hockey Junior Asia Cup was the eleventh edition of the Men's Hockey Junior Asia Cup, the men's international under-20 field hockey championship of Asia, organized by the Asian Hockey Federation. It was held from 4th to 13 September 2026 at the Moqi Training Base in Moqi, China. India, the defending champions, successfully retained the title after beating South Korea in the final. India claimed a record sixth title, becoming the first team to win the tournament four consecutive times. The top 6 teams qualified for the 2027 Junior World Cup.

South Korea qualified to the final after 18 years since 2008, by beating Pakistan in the semi-final. India reached their fourth consecutive final after defeating Malaysia 3–1 in the semifinal. Pakistan added a second bronze to their tally, overcoming Malaysia in the third-place playoff.

All matches were live streamed on the official YouTube channel of the Asian Hockey Federation.

== Venue ==
(China) Moqi
Moqi Training Base

== Qualification ==
=== Qualified teams ===
Dates	Event	Location	Quotas	Qualifiers
26 November – 4 December 2024	2024 Junior Asia Cup	Muscat, Oman	7	Bangladesh; China; Chinese Taipei; India; Japan; Malaysia; Pakistan
23 June – 1 July 2026	2026 Junior AHF Cup	Taldykorgan, Kazakhstan	3	Indonesia; Kazakhstan; South Korea
Total			10	

== Squads ==
Bangladesh

Head Coach: (South Africa) Giles Bonnet

2. Amit Hasan
3. Munna Islam
4. Shamim Ahmed
5. Sabbir Rahman
6. Tarek Islam
7. Tanvir Siam
8. Tayab Ali
9. Mohammad Abdullah
10. Din Islam
11. Mahadey Hassan
14. Mohammad Rifat
15. Ismail Hosen
16. Bishal Ahmed
17. Jony Islam
19. Sabbir Konok
20. Shimul Islam
20. Ashraful Alam
21. Sohorab Soton
22. Mahmud Hasan(GK)
25. Mohammad Tawsan Hossain
27. Mohammad Mehedi
28. Sumanta Chakma
33. Mohammad Raihanul Islam(GK)
34. Mohammad Mehedi Hasan Zinnat(GK)
China

Head Coach: (China) Cui Yongxin

1. Liang Jinglang(GK)
2. Jiang Xuehao
4. Ao Dongze
5. Shi Jiashun
6. Ding Zixuan
8. Ao You
9. Chen Xianzhen
10. Sun Jingran
11. Qiu Wenxuan
12. Liang Haolin
13. Tan Rushi
15. Li Kai
16. He Hongjun
19. Wang Yubo(C)
20. Wang Yuexian
22. Wu Hongwei
23. Zhang Zhiyuan(GK)
29. Su Haifeng
30. Hou Fuxuan
39. Ao Zuo
Chinese Taipei

Head Coach: (Chinese Taipei) Tsai Ming-heng

1. Liang Min-yi(GK)
5. Chen Bo-yan
6. Wang Zi-chien
9. Hsu Shao-wei
11. He Yue-fong
12. Cheng Hung-kai
13. Wang Teng-kuan
14. Wang Jun-wei
16. Li Mai-ke
18. Chang Yu-cheng
19. Chang Yao-sheng
22. Wan Wei-zhe
23. Liang Tien-an
25. Wei Cheng-ze(C)
26. Hu Jeng-jian
27. Chen Chun-yu
31. Chan Po-hung
32. Lin Chun-hong(GK)
India

Head Coach: (France) Fred Soyez

1. Ashu Maurya
2. Sukhvinder
3. Manmeet Singh Rai
4. Harpal
5. Sanjit Tirkey
7. Chirag
9. Gursewak Singh
11. Prabhdeep Singh
14. Aryan Xess
15. Rohit Kullu
16. Ritik Lakra
18. Vivek Lakra(GK)
25. Ajeet Yadav
26. Ravinder
27. Lovenoor Singh
30. Arjun Hargude
31. Jeetpal
35. Anmol Ekka(C)
60. Adrohit Ekka
88. Kunal Tewatia(GK)
Indonesia

Head Coach: (Indonesia) Irwan Hermawan

2. Fikri Daenuri
3. Simon Renyaan
5. Iqmal Mutaqin
7. Khaerulloh Akmal
8. Adzim Putra
9. Muhammad Ramdani
10. Wahyu Ishak
11. Septian Dwinanda
12. Devo Ramadhan
13. Muhamad Al Muroqi
14. Yustinus Zebua
15. Mochamad Ilham
20. Arthur Wibowo(C)
33. Muhamad Fahrezi(GK)
Japan

Head Coach: (Japan) Chujo Tomohiro

1. Toya Kyoya
2. Baba Kazato(C, GK)
5. Tanaka Ryuji
6. Sone Yunosuke
7. Nakanishi Kazuki
8. Sasaki Haruki
9. Otsuji Koki
10. Hanayama Shota
11. Hayashi Kazuna
13. Nakai Kazuki
14. Matsui Kaichi
15. Furusawa Chihiro
16. Yamada Seia
17. Toda Hiroki
18. Yasui Yasui
19. Sakai Rintaro
20. Inukai Yoga
21. Kosuke Saito(GK)
22. Sasaki Ryushin
27. Fujiwara Yuma
Kazakhstan

Head Coach: (Kazakhstan) Olga Urmanova

1. Arsen Zhanat(C)
3. Magzhan Nurmambet
4. Darkhan Nurbatyr
6. Suleiman Shavkatov
8. Nurfat Kissetayev
10. Rassul Duissengazy
16. Ablyay Khamit(GK)
17. Arnur Dautaliyev
18. Yerali Kairatuly
19. Yernur Orazkhan
21. Mukhammed Aslanuly
22. Yevgeniy Ashargin
25. Nurzhan Aisatar
30. Daryn Tursynbay(GK)
33. Madi Orazkhan
99. Dossymzhan Tursyngali
Malaysia

Head Coach: (Malaysia) Nor Saiful Zaini Nasir-ud-Din

1. Gagandeep Aphthar
5. A Aferullsyah
6. Nabil Yusof(C)
7. Dheeressh Gunaseelan
10. Muhammad Hafiezuddin Mohd Ali
11. Suzaini Fahmi
12. Adam Johari
13. Muhammad Faiz Afzan Mohd Faizal
14. Shelston Silverius
15. Muhammad Aizat
16. Mohamad Adib Amsyar(GK)
18. M Rahuul
20. Mohd Harieq
22. Haziq Hairul(GK)
23. Muhammad Asyraff
24. Mohamad Syazwan Mohd Shamsul
28. Karthikesan Shivamoorthy
30. Muhammad Salihe
34. George Eswaran
38. Iman Faizo
Pakistan

Head Coach: (Pakistan) Syed Hussain

1. Ahsan Mahmood(GK)
2. Asam Haider
6. Nadeem Khan
7. Ghulam Mustafa
8. Rana Abdul Sami
9. Muhammad Ahmad
10. Muhammad Shaheer
12. Muhammad Ihtesham(GK)
13. Muhammad Farooq
14. Sami Ullah
15. Basharat Ali
16. Saif Janjua
17. Muhammad Yahya Najeeb
18. Muhammad Farhan Aslam
19. Saif Ullah
22. Waleed Rana
27. Ali Ansar
44. Ali Hamza
60. Fayyaz Hamza(C)
77. Muhammad Arshad
South Korea

Head Coach: (South Korea) Lim Jung-bin

1. Kim Jinsoo(GK)
2. Son Changhwi
3. Kwon Jungwan
4. Kim Chansoo
5. Park Jaewon
6. Yoo Hyoguk
7. Moon Uijoon
8. Lee Minhyeok(C)
9. Kang Taewook
10. Yu Seungchul
11. Kwon Yechan
12. Pyo Junhuk
13. Kim Min-jae
14. Sung Dany
15. Ham Yeongung
16. Choi Dohyeon
17. Kyung Minjun
18. Park Seowon
19. Song Dabin
20. Lee Ji-hoon(GK)

Source:FIH

== Preliminary round ==
All times are local (UTC+8).

=== Pool A ===
Pos	Team	Pld	W	D	L	GF	GA	GD	Pts	Qualification
1	India	4	3	1	0	39	6	+33	10	Semi-finals
2	South Korea	4	3	0	1	31	9	+22	9	Semi-finals
3	Japan	4	2	1	1	15	6	+9	7	Classification round
4	Chinese Taipei	4	1	0	3	2	39	−37	3	Classification round
5	Indonesia	4	0	0	4	1	28	−27	0	Classification round

Source: FIH
Rules for classification: 1) points; 2) matches won; 3) goal difference; 4) goals for; 5) head-to-head result; 6) field goals for.

4 September 2026
09:00

South Korea	9–0	Indonesia
Lee 3', 22', 40', 43'; Choi 39', 49', 55'; Yu 42'; Kang 47'	Report

Umpires:
Su Boda (CHN)
Fahad Ali Khan (PAK)

4 September 2026
11:00

Japan	7–0	Chinese Taipei
Nakanishi 2'; Yamada 10', 26'; Toya 11'; Tanaka 28'; Sasaki 30'; Furusawa 60'	Report

Umpires:
Yin Yongbo (CHN)
Ho Ming Yin (HKG)

5 September 2026
09:00

India	14–0	Indonesia
Prabhdeep 5', 26', 30', 45', 52'; Harpal 8'; Ekka 16', 35', 42', 51'; Ajeet 20', 53', 53'; Maurya 59'	Report

Umpires:
Teoh Joven (SGP)
Kugannan Segaran (MAS)

5 September 2026
13:00

South Korea	16–0	Chinese Taipei
Lee 3', 17', 36', 50', 53', 57', 59'; Pyo 9'; Choi 19'; Park. S 26'; Park. J 32', 33'; Yoo 32', 49', 60'; Yu 32'	Report

Umpires:
Rashed Hasan Rony (BAN)
Adilzhan Kudaibergen (KAZ)

6 September 2026
11:00

Japan	3–3	India
Sasaki 11'; Nakanishi 48', 59'	Report	Ekka 4', 60'; Maurya 10'

Umpires:
Yin Yongbo (CHN)
Ishara Weerasinghe (SRI)

7 September 2026
11:00

Chinese Taipei	2–1	Indonesia
Wei 32'; Chang 58'	Report	Wibowo 47'

Umpires:
Mohit Rawat (IND)
Li Lulu (CHN)

8 September 2026
09:00

South Korea	3–7	India
Choi 6'; Yoo 19', 36'	Report	Ekka 5', 56'; Lovenoor 18'; Ajeet 20'; Prabhdeep 42'; Gursewak 55'; Xess 58'

Umpires:
Ravdeep Sethi (HKG)
Kugannan Segaran (MAS)

8 September 2026
11:00

Indonesia	0–3	Japan
	Report	Sakai 9'; Nakanishi 17'; Sasaki 25'

Umpires:
Adilzhan Kudaibergen (KAZ)
Mohit Rawat (IND)

9 September 2026
09:00

India	15–0	Chinese Taipei
Xess 17', 52', 53'; Prabhdeep 18'; Gursewak 22'; Ekka 25', 29', 32', 33', 45', 51'; Hargude 28'; Ajeet 35'; Harpal 48', 53'	Report

Umpires:
Teoh Joven (SGP)
Rashed Hasan Rony (BAN)

9 September 2026
11:00

Japan	2–3	South Korea
Yasui 45'; Yamada 59'	Report	Kim. M 10'; Lee 23'; Choi 53'

Umpires:
Yin Yongbo (CHN)
Hussain Al Hasani (OMA)

=== Pool B ===
Pos	Team	Pld	W	D	L	GF	GA	GD	Pts	Qualification
1	Pakistan	4	4	0	0	27	4	+23	12	Semi-finals
2	Malaysia	4	3	0	1	15	7	+8	9	Semi-finals
3	China (H)	4	2	0	2	15	9	+6	6	Classification round
4	Bangladesh	4	1	0	3	8	12	−4	3	Classification round
5	Kazakhstan	4	0	0	4	4	37	−33	0	Classification round

Source: FIH
Rules for classification: 1) points; 2) matches won; 3) goal difference; 4) goals for; 5) head-to-head result; 6) field goals for.
(H) Hosts

4 September 2026
13:00

Pakistan	15–0	Kazakhstan
B. Ali 3'; Sami 5', 28', 38', 49'; Nadeem 16', 20'; Waleed 26', 35', 43', 49'; Mustafa 30'; Ansar 43'; Najeeb 50'; A. Hamza 54'	Report

Umpires:
Kim Jeong-yong (KOR)
Ishara Weerasinghe (SRI)

4 September 2026
17:00

Bangladesh	2–3	China
Md Islam 6'; Hassan 26'	Report	Wang 6'; Qiu 44'; Sun 53'

Umpires:
Kato Takuma (JPN)
Hussain Al Hasani (OMA)

5 September 2026
17:00

Malaysia	8–0	Kazakhstan
M Rahuul 1', 32'; Salihe 32'; Mohd. H 39'; Aizat 44'; Aphthar 48'; Fahmi 51'; Gunaseelan 60'	Report

Umpires:
Kim Jeong-yong (KOR)
Mahmood Al Hasani (OMA)

5 September 2026
19:00

Pakistan	4–2	China
F. Hamza 2', 51'; Nadeem 18'; Sami 35'	Report	Wang 26'; Ao 54'

Umpires:
Kim Jiyong (KOR)
Ravdeep Sethi (HKG)

6 September 2026
15:00

Bangladesh	2–4	Malaysia
Abdullah 24'; Hassan 33'	Report	Gunaseelan 21'; Silverius 23'; Fahmi 48', 51'

Umpires:
Su Boda (CHN)
Fahad Ali Khan (PAK)

7 September 2026
17:00

China	10–2	Kazakhstan
Wang 2', 15', 27'; Wu 3', 22', 31', 57'; Ding 37'; Chen 50'; Sun 52'	Report	Zhanat 51', 60'

Umpires:
Lani Nichol (NZL)
Junko Wagatsuma (JPN)

8 September 2026
15:00

Pakistan	5–2	Malaysia
Nadeem 32'; Sami 36'; Waleed 39', 40'; A. Hamza 41'	Report	Salihe 9'; Gunaseelan 54'

Umpires:
Kim Jiyong (KOR)
Teoh Joven (SGP)

8 September 2026
17:00

Kazakhstan	2–4	Bangladesh
Kairatuly 7'; Zhanat 36'	Report	S. Islam 3'; Hassan 25'; Tayab 33'; M. Islam 50'

Umpires:
Kim Jeong-yong (KOR)
Kato Takuma (JPN)

9 September 2026
15:00

Bangladesh	0–3	Pakistan
	Report	Waleed 9', 12'; Mustafa 52'

Umpires:
Ishara Weerasinghe (SRI)
Kim Jeong-yong (KOR)

9 September 2026
17:00

Malaysia	1–0	China
Salihe 8'	Report

Umpires:
Kato Takuma (JPN)
Kim Jiyong (KOR)

== Classification round ==
=== Ninth and tenth place match ===
11 September 2026
10:00

Indonesia	4–3	Kazakhstan
Wibowo 15', 25', 27', 44'	Report	Zhanat 8', 9'; Tursyngali 54'

Umpires:
Ishara Weerasinghe (SRI)
Mahmood Al Hasani (OMA)

=== Bracket ===
5–8 place
11 September
China	9
Chinese Taipei	0
11 September
Japan	6
Bangladesh	2

Fifth place
12 September
China	1
Japan	3
Seventh place
12 September
Chinese Taipei	2
Bangladesh	5

=== 5–8th place semi-finals ===
11 September 2026
12:15

China	9–0	Chinese Taipei
Wang 4', 49'; Su 6'; Qiu 9'; Ao 16'; Chen 19', 48'; Tan 27'; Li 39'	Report

Umpires:
Kugannan Segaran (MAS)
Teoh Joven (SGP)

11 September 2026
14:30

Japan	6–2	Bangladesh
Yamada 2'; Sone 29'; Hanayama 30'; Sakai 36', 41'; Toya 45'	Report	Mehedi 41'; M. Islam 50'

Umpires:
Kim Jiyong (KOR)
Yin Yongbo (CHN)

=== Seventh and eighth place ===
12 September 2026
16:45

Chinese Taipei	2–5	Bangladesh
Li 12'; Chang 44'	Report	M. Islam 6'; Rifat 23', 48'; Tayab 44'; Abdullah 55'

Umpires:
Hussain Al Hasani (OMA)
Su Boda (CHN)

=== Fifth and sixth place ===
12 September 2026
19:00

China	1–3	Japan
Sun 5'	Report	Nakanishi 37'; Otsuji 47'; Yasui 57'

Umpires:
Kugannan Segaran (MAS)
Ravdeep Sethi (HKG)

== Medal round ==
=== Bracket ===
Semi-finals
11 September
India	3
Malaysia	1
11 September
Pakistan	1
South Korea	4

Final
13 September
India	4
South Korea	1
Third place
13 September
Malaysia	2
Pakistan	4

=== Semi-finals ===
11 September 2026
16:45

India	3–1	Malaysia
Ekka 16', 54'; Sukhvinder 51'	Report	M Rahuul 60'

Umpires:
Kato Takuma (JPN)
Fahad Ali Khan (PAK)

11 September 2026
19:00

Pakistan	1–4	South Korea
Nadeem 30'	Report	Park 21'; Lee 26'; Choi 41', 52'

Umpires:
Mohit Rawat (IND)
Ravdeep Sethi (HKG)

=== Bronze medal match ===
13 September 2026
14:15

Malaysia	2–4	Pakistan
Johari 11'; Fahmi 13'	Report	Sami 34', 47'; Shaheer 52'; Waleed 56'

Umpires:
Mohit Rawat (IND)
Kim Jiyong (KOR)

=== Gold medal match ===
13 September 2026
18:45

India	4–1	South Korea
Ajeet 9'; Ekka 13'; Prabhdeep 21'; Maurya 50'	Report	Lee 54'

Umpires:
Fahad Ali Khan (PAK)
Kato Takuma (JPN)

== Winners ==
2026 Men's Hockey Junior Asia Cup
(India)
India
6th title

== Awards ==
The following awards were given at the conclusion of the tournament:

Top scorer	Best player	Promising player	Best goalkeeper	Promising goalkeeper
(India) Anmol Ekka	(South Korea) Lee Minhyeok	(Pakistan) Waleed Rana	(India) Vivek Lakra	(Malaysia) Mohamad Adib Amsyar

== Statistics ==
=== Final standings ===
Pos	Grp	Team	Pld	W	D	L	GF	GA	GD	Pts	Qualification
1st place, gold medalist(s)	A	India	6	5	1	0	46	8	+38	16	2027 Junior World Cup
2nd place, silver medalist(s)	A	South Korea	6	4	0	2	36	14	+22	12	2027 Junior World Cup
3rd place, bronze medalist(s)	B	Pakistan	6	5	0	1	32	10	+22	15	2027 Junior World Cup
4	B	Malaysia	6	3	0	3	18	14	+4	9	2027 Junior World Cup
5	A	Japan	6	4	1	1	24	9	+15	13	2027 Junior World Cup
6	B	China (H)	6	3	0	3	25	12	+13	9	2027 Junior World Cup
7	B	Bangladesh	6	2	0	4	15	20	−5	6	Eliminated in group stage
8	A	Chinese Taipei	6	1	0	5	4	53	−49	3	Eliminated in group stage
9	A	Indonesia	5	1	0	4	5	31	−26	3	Eliminated in group stage
10	B	Kazakhstan	5	0	0	5	7	41	−34	0	Eliminated in group stage

Source: FIH
(H) Hosts

=== Goalscorers ===
There were 212 goals scored in 29 matches, for an average of 7.31 goals per match.

17 goals

- (India) Anmol Ekka

14 goals

- (South Korea) Lee Minhyeok

9 goals

- (Pakistan) Waleed Rana

8 goals

- (India) Prabhdeep Singh
- (Pakistan) Rana Abdul Sami
- (South Korea) Choi Dohyeon

7 goals

- (China) Wang Yubo

6 goals

- (India) Ajeet Yadav

5 goals

- (Indonesia) Arthur Wibowo
- (Japan) Nakanishi Kazuki
- (Kazakhstan) Arsen Zhanat
- (Pakistan) Nadeem Khan
- (South Korea) Yoo Hyoguk

4 goals

- (China) Wu Hongwei
- (India) Aryan Xess
- (Japan) Yamada Seia
- (Malaysia) Suzaini Fahmi

3 goals

- (Bangladesh) Mahadey Hassan
- (Bangladesh) Munna Islam
- (China) Chen Xianzhen
- (China) Sun Jingran
- (India) Harpal
- (India) Ashu Maurya
- (Japan) Sakai Rintaro
- (Malaysia) Dheeressh Gunaseelan
- (Malaysia) M Rahuul
- (Malaysia) Muhammad Salihe

2 goals

- (Bangladesh) Mohammad Abdullah
- (Bangladesh) Tayab Ali
- (Bangladesh) Mohammad Rifat
- (China) Ao Dongze
- (China) Qiu Wenxuan
- (Chinese Taipei) Chang Yu-cheng
- (India) Gursewak Singh
- (Japan) Sasaki Ryushin
- (Japan) Toya Kyoya
- (Japan) Yasui Tatsuaki
- (Pakistan) Ali Hamza
- (Pakistan) Fayyaz Hamza
- (Pakistan) Ghulam Mustafa
- (South Korea) Park Jaewon
- (South Korea) Park Seowon
- (South Korea) Yu Seungchul

1 goal

- (Bangladesh) Md Islam
- (Bangladesh) Shimul Islam
- (Bangladesh) Mohammad Mehedi
- (China) Ding Zixuan
- (China) Li Kai
- (China) Su Haifeng
- (China) Tan Rushi
- (Chinese Taipei) Li Mai-ke
- (Chinese Taipei) Wei Cheng-ze
- (India) Arjun Santosh Hargude
- (India) Lovenoor Singh
- (India) Sukhvinder
- (Japan) Furusawa Chihiro
- (Japan) Hanayama Shota
- (Japan) Otsuji Koki
- (Japan) Sasaki Haruki
- (Japan) Sone Yunosuke
- (Japan) Tanaka Ryuji
- (Kazakhstan) Yerali Kairatuly
- (Kazakhstan) Dossymzhan Tursyngali
- (Malaysia) Gagandeep Aphthar
- (Malaysia) Adam Johari
- (Malaysia) Muhammad Hafiezuddin Mohd Ali
- (Malaysia) Muhammad Aizat
- (Malaysia) Shelston Silverius
- (Pakistan) Basharat Ali
- (Pakistan) Ali Ansar
- (Pakistan) Muhammad Yahya Najeeb
- (Pakistan) Muhammad Shaheer
- (South Korea) Kang Taewook
- (South Korea) Kim Min-jae
- (South Korea) Pyo Junhuk

Source: FIH

== See also ==
- 2026 Men's Hockey U18 Asia Cup
