= Anmol Ekka =

Indian field hockey player

Personal information
- Full name: Anmol Ekka
- Born: 30 January 2006 (age 20) Biramitrapur, Sundergarh, Odisha, India

Sport
- Sport: Field hockey
- Position: Defender; Drag-flicker
Senior career
Years	Team	Caps	Goals
2023–2024	Hockey Odisha	9	13
2025–2025	Team Gonasika	7	-
2026–	Ranchi Royals	10	-
National team
Years	Team	Caps	Goals
2024–	India U21	30	(22)
Medal record
Men's field hockey
Representing India
Junior World Cup
Bronze medal – third place	2025 Tamil Nadu
Junior Asia Cup
Gold medal – first place	2024 Muscat
Gold medal – first place	2026 Moqi
Sultan of Johor Cup
Silver medal – second place	2025 Johor Bahru
Bronze medal – third place	2024 Johor Bahru

Anmol Ekka (born 30 January 2006) is an Indian field hockey player and captain of the India men's national under-21 field hockey team. He plays as a defender and drag flicker.

== Early life ==
Anmol Ekka hails from Biramitrapur of Sundergarh district in Odisha. He did his schooling in Sundargarh Town High School and higher education in Rourkela.

== Career ==
Anmol Ekka developed his hockey skills in the SAIL Hockey Academy in Rourkela. Later, he joined the Naval Tata Hockey High Performance Centre in Bhubaneswar. He won the silver medal and was the leading scorer in the inaugural 2023 Hockey India Junior Men's East Zone Championship in Khunti.

He was first selected for the junior national team for the European tour in May 2024. He represented India at the 2024 Sultan of Johor Cup He was part of the team that won the 2024 junior Asia Cup. He scored the equaliser in the final against Australia at the 2025 Sultan of Johor Cup, where India lost 1–2. Anmol made his debut in the 2024–25 Hockey India League with the Team Gonasika.

At the 2025 Junior World Cup, Anmol Ekka scored the India's only goal in the semi-final match against Germany as they lost 1–5. In the bronze medal match against Argentina, when India were trailing 0–2 after third quarter, Anmol Ekka assisted India's first goal which was successfully put inside the net by Ankit Pal. Anmol later scored the fourth goal in the 58th minute as India won 4–2. Anmol was awarded the Player of the Match. He joined the Ranchi Royals team in the 2025–26 Hockey India League.

Anmol became the captain of the junior national team for the Belgium tour in July 2026. He led the team to the 2026 junior Asia Cup title where he was the top scorer with 17 goals.
