= 2016 Men's Hockey U18 Asia Cup =

Asian field hockey tournament

Tournament details
- Host country: Bangladesh
- City: Dhaka
- Dates: 24–30 September
- Teams: 7 (from 1 confederation)
- Venue: Maulana Bhasani Hockey Stadium

Final positions
- Champions: India (2nd title)
- Runner-up: Bangladesh
- Third place: Pakistan

Tournament statistics
- Matches played: 15
- Goals scored: 123 (8.2 per match)
- Top scorer: (Bangladesh) Ashraful Islam (11 goals)
- Best player: (Bangladesh) Roman Sarkar
- Best goalkeeper: (India) Pankaj Kumar Rajak

The 2016 Men's Hockey U18 Asia Cup was the fourth edition of the men's Hockey U18 Asia Cup. The tournament had seven Asian boys' national teams contested, organized by the Asian Hockey Federation. The tournament was held in Dhaka, Bangladesh from 24th to 30th September 2016. It was the second tournament for the hosts, Bangladesh, after their first participation in 2001.

India won their second championship since 2001, after beating Bangladesh in the final. Pakistan secured the bronze, defeating Chinese Taipei. The defending champions Korea did not participate in this edition.

== Venue ==
(Bangladesh) Dhaka
Maulana Bhasani Hockey Stadium
Capacity: 10,000

== Teams ==
- Bangladesh
- China
- Chinese Taipei
- Hong Kong
- India
- Oman
- Pakistan

== Preliminary round ==
All times are in BST (UTC+6)

=== Pool A ===
Pos	Team	Pld	W	D	L	GF	GA	GD	Pts	Qualification
1	Bangladesh (H)	2	2	0	0	15	4	+11	6	Semi-finals
2	India	2	1	0	1	15	5	+10	3	Semi-finals
3	Oman	2	0	0	2	0	21	−21	0	Classification round

Source: Report
Rules for classification: 1) points; 2) matches won; 3) goal difference; 4) goals for; 5) head-to-head result; 6) field goals for.
(H) Hosts

24 September 2016
15:00

India	4–5	Bangladesh
	Report

25 September 2016
15:00

Oman	0–11	India
	Report

27 September 2016
15:00

Bangladesh	10–0	Oman
	Report

=== Pool B ===
Pos	Team	Pld	W	D	L	GF	GA	GD	Pts	Qualification
1	Pakistan	3	3	0	0	26	1	+25	9	Semi-finals
2	Chinese Taipei	3	1	1	1	12	8	+4	4	Semi-finals
3	China	3	1	1	1	8	8	0	4	Classification round
4	Hong Kong	3	0	0	3	0	29	−29	0	Classification round

Source: Report
Rules for classification: 1) points; 2) matches won; 3) goal difference; 4) goals for; 5) head-to-head result; 6) field goals for.

24 September 2016
11:00

China	6–0	Hong Kong
	Report

24 September 2016
13:00

Pakistan	6–1	Chinese Taipei
	Report

25 September 2016
11:00

Chinese Taipei	9–0	Hong Kong
	Report

25 September 2016
13:00

China	0–6	Pakistan

27 September 2016
11:00

Chinese Taipei	2–2	China
	Report

27 September 2016
13:00

Pakistan	14–0	Hong Kong
	Report

== Classification round ==
5–7th place semifinals
29 September
Oman	4
Hong Kong	2

Fifth place
30 September
Oman	1
China	2

=== Fifth to Seventh place crossover ===
29 September 2016
10:00

Oman	4–2	Hong Kong
	Report

=== Fifth place match ===
30 September 2016
10:00

Oman	1–2	China
	Report

== Medal round ==
Semi-finals
29 September
Bangladesh	6
Chinese Taipei	1
29 September
India	3
Pakistan	1

Final
30 September
Bangladesh	4
India	5
Third place
30 September
Chinese Taipei	0
Pakistan	18

=== Semi finals ===
29 September 2016
12:30

Bangladesh	6–1	Chinese Taipei
	Report

29 September 2016
15:00

India	3–1	Pakistan
	Report

=== Third place match ===
30 September 2016
12:30

Chinese Taipei	0–18	Pakistan
	Report

=== Final ===
30 September 2016
15:00

Bangladesh	4–5	India
	Report

== Winners ==
2016 Men's Hockey U18 Asia Cup
(India)
India
2nd title

== Final standings ==
Pos	Team	Pld	W	D	L	GF	GA	GD	Pts	
1st place, gold medalist(s)	India	4	3	0	1	23	10	+13	9	Champions
2nd place, silver medalist(s)	Bangladesh (H)	4	3	0	1	25	10	+15	9	Runners up
3rd place, bronze medalist(s)	Pakistan	5	4	0	1	45	4	+41	12	3rd
4	Chinese Taipei	5	1	1	3	13	32	−19	4	4th
5	China	4	2	1	1	10	9	+1	7	Eliminated in group stage
6	Oman	4	1	0	3	5	25	−20	3	Eliminated in group stage
7	Hong Kong	4	0	0	4	2	33	−31	0	Eliminated in group stage

(H) Hosts

== See also ==
- 2016 Women's Hockey U18 Asia Cup
