= Amandeep Singh =

Amandeep Singh may refer to:

- Amandeep Singh (cricketer) (born 1987), New Zealand cricketer
- Amandeep Singh (footballer) (born 1988), Indian footballer
