= India men's national under-18 field hockey team =

Under-18 hockey team that represents India

India U18 boys
- Association: Hockey India
- Confederation: AHF (Asia)
- Head Coach: (India) Sardar Singh
- Captain: Ketan Kushwaha

First international
- India 7–0 Oman (Ipoh, 2001)

Last international
- Japan 1–4 India (Kakamigahara, 6 June 2026)

Biggest win
- India 17–1 Brunei (Ipoh, 2001)

Boys' Asia Cup
- Appearances: 4 (first in 2001)
- Best result: (gold) Champions (2001, 2016, 2026)
Medal record
Boys' Asia Cup
Gold medal – first place	2001 Ipoh
Gold medal – first place	2016 Dhaka
Gold medal – first place	2026 Kakamigahara

The India men's national under-18 field hockey team represents India at international field hockey youth tournaments, governed by Hockey India. They are the defending Asian Champions, having won the recently concluded 2026 Boys' Asia Cup.

== History ==
=== U18 team ===
The first recorded tournament played by the Indian youth team is the 2001 U18 Asia Cup, which was held in Kuala Lumpur. They won the title, beating Uzbekistan in the final. They participated in the 2009 Asia Cup in Yangon where the tournament winner would qualify for the inaugural Youth Olympic Games, but failed to make it to the final. They did not take part in the 2011 Asia Cup. India, under the captaincy of Nilam Sanjeep Xess, clinched their second Asia title in 2016 after edging Bangladesh in the final by 5–4.

India did not compete in the 2025 U18 Asia Cup. Australia U18 team played a four-match series against India at Udhav Das Mehta (Bhai Ji) Central SAI Centre in Bhopal in May 2026. The first match saw 2–2 draw and Australia won the second match by 3–1. India won the third contest by 6–3 and they drew the last match by 3–3. The series ended as 1–1 stalemate.

The Ketan Kushwaha led side won the 2026 title after a 4–1 win against Japan in the final, with Ashish Tani Purti scoring hat-trick goals.

=== U17 team ===
In 2023, Indian U17 squad toured Netherlands for their first international tournament. They defeated Ede club by 8–0 in their first match. They lost 1–7 to the Netherlands U18 team. They defeated the Netherlands U16 team by 4–2 and 4–0 in the successive matches.

=== U16 team ===
Indian U16 team, under the captaincy of Prabodh Tirkey, won the inaugural Sub-Junior U16 Asia Cup in 2000 in Singapore. They defeated Japan by 12–0, Singapore by 9–0 in the semi-final and Bangladesh by 5–2 in the final to clinch the championship. India, led by V. R. Raghunath, retained the title in 2003 in Dhaka after defeating Sri Lanka by 8–0 and Bangladesh by 4–1 in the final.

== Tournament record ==
=== Summer Youth Olympics ===
Summer Youth Olympics
Year	Host	Round	Position	Pld	W	D	L	GF	GA
2010	Singapore, Singapore	Did not qualify							

=== Boys' Asia Cup ===
Boys' Asia Cup
Year	Host	Round	Position	Pld	W	D	L	GF	GA
2001	Ipoh, Malaysia	Final	1st place, gold medalist(s)	6	6	0	0	54	6
2009	Yangon, Myanmar	Group stage	5th	4	2	0	2	15	8
2011	Singapore, Singapore	Did not participate							
2016	(Bangladesh) Dhaka, Bangaladesh	Final	1st place, gold medalist(s)	4	3	0	1	23	10
2025	Dazhou, China	Did not participate							
2026	Kakamigahara, Japan	Final	1st place, gold medalist(s)	6	5	0	1	41	10
	Total		3 Titles	20	16	0	4	133	34

Youth Asia Cup (2001–2009) history
Year	Round	Score	Result
2001	Group	India 7–0 Oman	Win
2001	Group	India 10–0 Singapore	Win
2001	Group	India 6–4 Malaysia	Win
2001	Group	India 17–1 Brunei	Win
2001	Semi final	India 7–0 South Korea	Win
2001	Final	India 7–1 Uzbekistan	Win
2009	Group	India 2–3 Malaysia	Loss
2009	Group	Pakistan 4–3 India	Loss
2009	Group	India 6–0 Sri Lanka	Win
2009	5/6	India 4–1 Singapore	Win

== Honours ==
=== Major tournaments ===
- Boys' Asia Cup:
  - (gold) Champions: 2001, 2016, 2026

== Current squad ==
The following Indian team named for the 2026 U18 Asia Cup, held at Kakamigahara, from 29 May to 6 June 2026

Head coach: (India) Sardar Singh

Players, caps and goals updated as of 6 June 2026.

No.	Pos.	Player	Date of birth (age)	Caps	Goals	Club
54	GK	Ayush Rajak	4 August 2010 (age 16)	6		
16	GK	Sawan kumar	4 September 2010 (age 16)	2		
4	DF	Ansh Bahutra	22 September 2010 (age 16)	6	2	
3	DF	Arman Soreng	9 October 2010 (age 16)	6		
7	DF	Arshdip Singh	10 January 2010 (age 16)	6		
17	DF	Ashish Tani Purti	24 January 2011 (age 15)	6	13	
20	DF	Avi Manikpuri	30 December 2010 (age 15)	6		
18	DF	Romit Pal	4 June 2011 (age 15)	6		
1	MF	Karan Gautam	2 November 2010 (age 16)	6	1	
41	MF	Premchad Soy	14 January 2010 (age 16)	6	1	
5	MF	Rahul Yadav	16 December 2012 (age 13)	6	2	
77	MF	Siddharth Ben	19 November 2010 (age 15)	6	2	
12	MF	Varinder Singh	6 March 2014 (age 12)	6	2	
22	FW	Akash Deep	1 March 2011 (age 15)	6	1	
10	FW	Gazee Khan	21 April 2014 (age 12)	6	3	
11	FW	Ketan Kushwaha (Captain)	11 December 2011 (age 14)	6	8	
8	FW	Prahalad Rajbhar	3 August 2010 (age 16)	6	2	
9	FW	Shahrukh Ali	25 May 2010 (age 16)	6	4	

== Coaching staff ==
Position	Name
Head coach	(India) Sardar Singh
Coach	(India) Rajnish Kumar Mishra
Strength and Conditioning Coach	(India) Daman Preet Singh
Physiotherapist	(India) Bhanu Uday Shandiliya
Masseuse	(India) Pawan Mandal

== Results and fixtures ==
The following is a list of match results in the last 12 months, as well as any future matches that have been scheduled.

Win Draw Loss Fixture

=== 2026 ===
All times are local (UTC+5:30).

15 May 2026 Practice Match 1	India	2–2	Australia	Bhopal, India
17:00		Report		Stadium: Udhav Das Mehta (Bhai Ji) Central Centre

17 May 2026 Practice Match 2	India	1–3	Australia	Bhopal, India
19:00		Report		Stadium: Udhav Das Mehta (Bhai Ji) Central Centre

18 May 2026 Practice Match 3	India	6–3	Australia	Bhopal, India
17:00		Report		Stadium: Udhav Das Mehta (Bhai Ji) Central Centre

20 May 2026 Practice Match 4	India	3–3	Australia	Bhopal, India
18:00		Report		Stadium: Udhav Das Mehta (Bhai Ji) Central Centre

29 May 2026 Asia Cup Pool A	India	13–0	Kazakhstan	Kakamigahara, Japan
09:30	S. Ali 12', 29'; Rajbhar 14', 51'; Kushwaha 18', 45', 45'; G. Khan 20'; Purti 30', 43'; Bahutra 31', 44'; Akash 47'	Report		Stadium: Kawasaki Heavy Industries Hockey Stadium

31 May 2026 Asia Cup Pool A	Japan	4–2	India	Kakamigahara, Japan
13:30	Yoshioka 15'; Fujiwara 20'; Yasui 34'; Takahashi 42'	Report	Purti 25'; Kushwaha 32'	Stadium: Kawasaki Heavy Industries Hockey Stadium

1 June 2026 Asia Cup Pool A	South Korea	1–4	India	Kakamigahara, Japan
15:30	Yun 21'	Report	Kushwaha 3', 36'; Varinder 5'; Shahrukh 54'	Stadium: Kawasaki Heavy Industries Hockey Stadium

3 June 2026 Asia Cup Pool A	India	13–1	Chinese Taipei	Kakamigahara, Japan
13:30	Gautam 7'; Soy 11'; Kushwaha 13'; Rahul 20', 54'; Purti 27', 35', 42'; Ben 30', 52'; G. Khan 40', 44'; Varinder 50'	Report	Jhang 30+'	Stadium: Kawasaki Heavy Industries Hockey Stadium

5 June 2026 Asia Cup Semi-final	Pakistan	3–5	India	Kakamigahara, Japan
15:30	Adeel 27'; Aslam 37'; Qureshi 42'	Report	Purti 12', 49', 53', 56'; S. Ali 35'	Stadium: Kawasaki Heavy Industries Hockey Stadium

6 June 2026 Asia Cup Final	Japan	1–4	India	Kakamigahara, Japan
15:30	Numada 52'	Report	Purti 2', 28', 34'; Kushwaha 30'	Stadium: Kawasaki Heavy Industries Hockey Stadium

== Head-to-head record ==
Won more matches than lost
All matches drawn
Won equal matches to lost
Lost more matches than won

=== Overall record ===
Record last updated as of the following match:

India vs Japan at Kawasaki Heavy Industries Hockey Stadium, Kakamigahara in the 2026 U18 Asia Cup, 6 June 2026 (excluding friendlies & practice tournaments)

Opponent	GP	W	D	L	GF	GA	Win %	Last meeting
Bangladesh	2	1	0	1	9	9	50%	2016
Brunei	1	1	0	0	17	1	100%	2001
Chinese Taipei	1	1	0	0	13	1	100%	2026
Japan	2	1	0	1	6	5	50%	2026
South Korea	2	2	0	0	11	2	100%	2026
Kazakhstan	1	1	0	0	13	0	100%	2026
Malaysia	2	1	0	1	8	7	50%	2009
Oman	2	2	0	0	18	0	100%	2016
Pakistan	3	2	0	1	11	8	66.67%	2026
Singapore	2	2	0	0	14	1	50%	2009
Sri Lanka	1	1	0	0	6	0	100%	2009
Uzbekistan	1	1	0	0	7	0	100%	2001
Total	20	16	0	4	133	34	80%	2026

=== India Pakistan rivalry ===
India lead the head-to-head record against Pakistan, with 2 wins from 3 matches, compared with Pakistan's 1 win.

The following table shows India vs Pakistan in major tournaments :

Tournament	Year	Venue	Winning team, result
Under-18 Asia Cup	2009	(Myanmar) Yangon	Pakistan, 4–3
Under-18 Asia Cup	2016	(Bangladesh) Dhaka	India, 3–1
Under-18 Asia Cup	2026	(Japan) Kakamigahara	India, 5–3

== See also ==
Indian national hockey teams
Men's					Women's				
Senior	Under-21	Under-18	Senior Hockey5s	Under-18 hockey5s	Senior	Under-21	Under-18	Senior Hockey5s	Under-18 hockey5s

- Field hockey in India
- India national para hockey team
