= Men's Hockey U18 Asia Cup =

International U18 field hockey tournament

- Most recent season or competition: 2026 Men's Hockey U18 Asia Cup
- Formerly: Boys' Sub-Junior Asia Cup
- Sport: Field hockey
- Founded: 2001; 25 years ago
- First season: 2001
- No. of teams: 9
- Confederation: Asian Hockey Federation
- Most recent champion: India (3rd title) (2026)
- Most titles: India (3 titles)

The Men's Hockey U18 Asia Cup is a boys' international under-18 field hockey tournament organized by the Asian Hockey Federation. The tournament has been held since 2001. India are the defending champions, having won the 2026 edition.

The tournament has been won by four different teams: India has won the most titles with three in its cabinet. Pakistan, Korea and Japan have won the tournament once.

The second edition of the tournament served as the continental qualifier for the inaugural Youth Olympics, with the winners securing the sole qualification spot.

== Results ==
#	Year	Host	Final			Third place match			Teams
#	Year	Host	Winner	Score	Runner-up	Third place	Score	Fourth place	Teams
1	2001	Ipoh, Malaysia	India	7–0	Uzbekistan	Malaysia		South Korea	9
2	2009	Yangon, Myanmar	Pakistan	4–3	Malaysia	South Korea	4–1	Japan	9
3	2011	Singapore	South Korea	3–1	Malaysia	Pakistan	6–0	Singapore	9
4	2016	Dhaka, Bangladesh	India	5–4	Bangladesh	Pakistan	18–0	Chinese Taipei	7
5	2025	Dazhou, China	Japan	3–0	Pakistan	Malaysia	5–2	Bangladesh	11
6	2026	Kakamigahara, Japan	India	4–1	Japan	Pakistan	3–0	Malaysia	9

== Successful national teams ==
Teams reaching the top four
Team	Champions	Runners-up	Third place	Fourth place
India	3 (2001, 2016, 2026)			
Pakistan	1 (2009)	1 (2025)	3 (2011, 2016, 2026)	
Japan	1 (2025)	1 (2026*)		1 (2009)
South Korea	1 (2011)		1 (2009)	1 (2001)
Malaysia		2 (2009, 2011)	2 (2001*, 2025)	1 (2026)
Bangladesh		1 (2016*)		1 (2025)
Uzbekistan		1 (2001)		
Singapore				1 (2011*)
Chinese Taipei				1 (2016)

* = host country

== See also ==
- Men's U18 Hockey5's Asia Cup
- Men's Hockey Asia Cup
