= 2023 Men's Hockey5s Oceania Cup =

Field hockey 5s tournament

1st Oceania Hockey5s World Cup Qualifier
Tournament details
- Host country: Australia
- City: Gold Coast
- Dates: 10 July 2023–14 July 2023
- Teams: 7 (from 1 confederation)
- Venue: Gold Coast Hockey Centre

Final positions
- Champions: Australia
- Runner-up: New Zealand
- Third place: Fiji

Tournament statistics
- Matches played: 27
- Goals scored: 269 (9.96 per match)
- Top scorer: (Australia) Liam Kerr-Nelson (21 goals)

The 1st Oceania Hockey5s World Cup Qualifier is the first edition of the Oceania Hockey5s World Cup Qualifier for the men's Hockey5s event at the FIH Hockey5s World Cup. It was held alongside the women's tournament in Gold Coast, Australia from 10 to 14 July 2023.

The winner, runner-up and third-placed teams of the tournament all qualified for the 2024 Hockey5s World Cup.

Australia won both the men's and women's Oceania Cup.

== Teams ==
- Australia
- Fiji
- New Zealand
- Papua New Guinea
- Solomon Islands
- Tonga
- Vanuatu

== Results ==
Pos	Team	Pld	W	D	L	GF	GA	GD	Pts	Qualification
1	Australia (H)	6	6	0	0	59	12	+47	18	Final
2	New Zealand	6	4	1	1	45	13	+32	13	Final
3	Fiji	6	3	1	2	33	24	+9	10	Final
4	Solomon Islands	6	3	0	3	22	37	−15	9	Final
5	Vanuatu	6	2	1	3	23	37	−14	7	5–7th place semi-finals
6	Papua New Guinea	6	1	1	4	22	32	−10	4	5–7th place semi-finals
7	Tonga	6	0	0	6	13	62	−49	0	5–7th place semi-finals

Source: FIH
Rules for classification: 1) points; 2) matches won; 3) goal difference; 4) goals for; 5) head-to-head result; 6) field goals for.
(H) Hosts

10 July 2023
11:00

Tonga	1–14	Fiji
Finau 5'	Report	Dutta 2', 3', 5', 6', 10', 12', 13', 18'; Corrie 3'; Underwood 5', 15'; Tora 6'; Edwards 16', 20'

Umpires:
Timothy Sheahan (AUS)
Ryan Potter (NZL)

10 July 2023
11:50

New Zealand	9–2	Papua New Guinea
M. Bell-Kake 2', 20'; J. Bell-Kake 3'; Hickson 5', 10'; Murray 10', 14', 14'; Banks 11'	Report	Hebei 13', 18'

Umpires:
Epeli Tukuca (FIJ)
Malkom Mayoho (VAN)

10 July 2023
12:40

Australia	11–2	Solomon Islands
Kerr-Nelson 2', 3', 12', 13', 20'; Sugio 5'; Profke 7'; Commins 10', 10'; J. McCann 18'; Pace 18'	Report	Satu 9'; Zuna 15'

Umpires:
Brendan Bon (PNG)
Aaron Wong (FIJ)

11 July 2023
12:30

Papua New Guinea	9–4	Tonga
Lowah 4'; Herman 6'; Pomoso 8', 12'; Dusty 11', 11'; Pomaleu 16', 16'; Ilumpui 18'	Report	Smith 4', 12'; Finau 5'; Feiloaki 7'

11 July 2023
13:20

New Zealand	9–2	Vanuatu
Hickson 1', 6', 14'; Raharuhi 2'; Murray 6'; Banks 7'; J. Bell-Kake 13', 18'; M. Bell-Kake 17'	Report	Sam 13'; Lily 20'

11 July 2023
14:10

Australia	10–3	Fiji
C. McCann 3', 7'; Kerr-Nelson 5', 6', 9'; Sugio 12', 13'; Pace 15', 20'; Profke 20'	Report	Mock 2'; Corrie 8'; Dutta 18'

11 July 2023
17:30

New Zealand	12–0	Tonga
J. Bell-Kake 3', 3', 8', 9', 13'; M. Bell-Kake 8', 14', 15'; Banks 9'; Iversen 12'; Murray 19', 20'	Report

11 July 2023
18:20

Papua New Guinea	4–5	Solomon Islands
Lowah 11'; Raoma 14'; Hebei 17', 20'	Report	Luiramo 5', 7', 11'; Satu 8'; Zuna 16'

11 July 2023
19:10

Australia	16–2	Vanuatu
Sugio 1'; J. McCann 2', 8', 9', 10'; Kerr-Nelson 3', 15'; Profke 5', 18'; C. McCann 11'; Commins 12', 19'; Pace 13', 14', 18', 19'	Report	Misak 13'; Namu 19'

12 July 2023
10:00

New Zealand	7–0	Solomon Islands
Hickson 3'; J. Bell-Kake 6'; M. Bell-Kake 10', 16'; Banks 12', 19', 20'	Report

12 July 2023
10:50

Australia	11–0	Tonga
C. McCann 3', 3', 10', 14'; Kerr-Nelson 4', 8', 13'; Pace 5', 6'; Commins 9'; J. McCann 12'	Report

12 July 2023
11:40

Vanuatu	1–3	Fiji
Namu 19'	Report	Ravatu 9', 17'; Smith 10'

12 July 2023
15:00

Australia	7–2	Papua New Guinea
Commins 2'; Pace 4', 10'; J. McCann 6', 12'; Kerr-Nelson 16', 18'	Report	Hebei 4'; Raoma 20+'

12 July 2023
15:50

Solomon Islands	6–5	Fiji
Paekera 7'; Faraimoa 11', 17'; Satu 16', 20'; Luiramo 20+'	Report	Tora 2'; Dutta 15', 19'; Edwards 15', 18'

12 July 2023
16:40

Tonga	3–9	Vanuatu
Smith 2', 20'; Finau 15'	Report	Namu 1', 10+', 11', 14', 17'; Job 8', 15'; Maltungtung 18'; Lily 19'

13 July 2023
12:30

New Zealand	5–5	Fiji
Iversen 9', 10', 17'; Murray 16'; J. Bell-Kake 18'	Report	Dutta 5', 20'; Mock 10'; Edwards 11', 11'

13 July 2023
13:20

Papua New Guinea	4–4	Vanuatu
Raoma 7', 13'; Hebei 12'; Ilumpui 20'	Report	Namu 1', 13'; Sam 14'; Katawa 17'

13 July 2023
14:10

Solomon Islands	7–5	Tonga
Paekera 5', 10'; Zuna 7'; Satu 12', 17'; Luiramo 18'; Temoa 20'	Report	Finau 8', 14'; Smith 9', 11', 19'

13 July 2023
17:30

Papua New Guinea	1–3	Fiji
Pomaleu 16'	Report	Edwards 3', 8'; Dutta 6'

Umpires:
Ryan Potter (NZL)
Malkom Mayoho (VAN)

13 July 2023
18:20

Solomon Islands	2–5	Vanuatu
Luiramo 14'; Aeta 19'	Report	Maltungtung 10'; Misak 18'; Katmatem 19'; Namu 19'; Katawa 20'

Umpires:
Timothy Sheahan (AUS)
Aaron Wong (FIJ)

13 July 2023
19:10

Australia	4–3	New Zealand
Kerr-Nelson 2', 4'; Profke 5'; Pace 14'	Report	J. Bell-Kake 5', 18'; T. Iversen 17'

Umpires:
Epeli Tukuca (FIJ)
Brendan Bon (PNG)

== Fifth to seventh place classification ==
Cross-over
14 July
Papua New Guinea (p.s.o.)	4 (2)
Tonga	4 (1)

Fifth place
14 July
Vanuatu	5
Papua New Guinea	4

=== Cross-over ===
14 July 2023
09:50

Papua New Guinea	4–4	Tonga
Pomoso 1'; Hebel 11'; Raoma 16'; Pomaleu 16'	Report	Smith 1', 4'; Finau 8'; Vehekite 15'
Penalties
Ilumpui (penalty shoot-out scored); Pomaleu (penalty shoot-out missed); Raoma (penalty shoot-out scored)	2–1	(penalty shoot-out missed) Smith; (penalty shoot-out scored) Tahilanu; (penalty shoot-out missed) Finau

Umpires:
Epeli Tukuca (FIJ)
Malkom Mayoho (VAN)

=== Fifth and sixth place ===
14 July 2023
14:50

Vanuatu	5–4	Papua New Guinea
Namu 2', 8'; Maltungtung 6'; Misak 17'; Lily 19'	Report	Dusty 10', 14', 16'; Ilumpui 17'

Umpires:
Epeli Tukuca (FIJ)
Timothy Sheahan (AUS)

== First to fourth place classification ==
Semi-finals
14 July
New Zealand	6
Fiji	2
14 July
Australia	10
Solomon Islands	0

Final
14 July
New Zealand	4
Australia	6
Third place
14 July
Fiji	6
Solomon Islands	1

=== Semi-finals ===
14 July 2023
11:30

New Zealand	6–2	Fiji
T. Iversen 2', 14'; Raharuhi 3'; Hickson 10'; Banks 12'; J. Bell-Kake 20'	Report	Edwards 13'; Ravatu 15'

Umpires:
Timothy Sheahan (AUS)
Brendan Bon (PNG)

14 July 2023
13:10

Australia	10–0	Solomon Islands
Pace 3', 8', 10'; C. McCann 4'; Commins 6', 19', 20'; Kerr-Nelson 10', 20+'; Profke 10'	Report

Umpires:
Ryan Potter (NZL)
Aaron Wong (FIJ)

=== Third place game ===
14 July 2023
14:50

Fiji	6–1	Solomon Islands
Smith 2', 14'; Dutta 3', 9'; Underwood 10'; Edwards 18'	Report	Temoa 10'

Umpires:
Timothy Sheahan (AUS)
Ryan Potter (NZL)

=== Final ===
14 July 2023
18:10

New Zealand	4–6	Australia
Hickson 3', 8', 15'; Raharuhi 7'	Report	Profke 9', 11', 14'; J. McCann 10'; Kerr-Nelson 18', 20'

Umpires:
Brendan Bon (PNG)
Aaron Wong (FIJ)

== Goalscorers ==
There were 269 goals scored in 27 matches, for an average of 9.96 goals per match.

21 goals

- (Australia) Liam Kerr-Nelson

16 goals

- (Fiji) Leevan Dutta

15 goals

- (Australia) Mitchell Pace

13 goals

- (New Zealand) Jakob Bell-Kake

12 goals

- (Vanuatu) Hiro Namu

10 goals

- (Australia) Joshua Commins
- (Fiji) Jerome Edwards
- (New Zealand) James Hickson

9 goals

- (Australia) Jake McCann
- (Australia) Zac Profke
- (Tonga) Aden Smith

8 goals

- (Australia) Cody McCann
- (New Zealand) Mark Bell-Kake

7 goals

- (New Zealand) Adam Banks
- (New Zealand) Mitchell Murray
- (Papua New Guinea) Lionel Hebei

6 goals

- (New Zealand) Taimana Iversen
- (Solomon Islands) Paul Luiramo
- (Solomon Islands) Lesly Satu
- (Tonga) Fosita Finau

5 goals

- (Papua New Guinea) Jersey Dusty
- (Papua New Guinea) Andrew Raoma

4 goals

- (Papua New Guinea) Raymond Pomaleu

3 goals

- (Australia) Jun Sugio
- (Fiji) George Ravatu
- (Fiji) Hector Smith
- (Fiji) Clapton Underwood
- (New Zealand) Tuterangiwhakaea Raharuhi
- (Papua New Guinea) Barry Ilumpui
- (Papua New Guinea) Trent Pomoso
- (Solomon Islands) Enoc Paekera
- (Solomon Islands) Nyrick Zuna
- (Vanuatu) Jossie Lily
- (Vanuatu) Nasse Maltungtung
- (Vanuatu) Jessy Misak

2 goals

- (Fiji) Terence Corrie
- (Fiji) Denzel Mock
- (Fiji) Tristan Tora
- (Papua New Guinea) Hussein Lowah
- (Solomon Islands) Ricky Faraimoa
- (Solomon Islands) Allen Temoa
- (Vanuatu) Nicholsen Job
- (Vanuatu) Jacklyniho Katawa
- (Vanuatu) Ben Sam

1 goal

- (New Zealand) Herewini Iversen
- (Papua New Guinea) Chanan Herman
- (Solomon Islands) Alex Aeta
- (Tonga) Wesley Vehekite
- (Tonga) Siosifa Feiloaki
- (Vanuatu) John Katmatem

Source: FIH

== Final standing ==
Rank	Team
1st place, gold medalist(s)	Australia
2nd place, silver medalist(s)	New Zealand
3rd place, bronze medalist(s)	Fiji
4	Solomon Islands
5	Vanuatu
6	Papua New Guinea
7	Tonga

Qualified for the 2024 World Cup

== See also ==
- 2023 Women's Hockey5s Oceania Cup
