= 2023 Women's Hockey5s Oceania Cup =

1st Oceania Hockey5s World Cup Qualifier
Tournament details
- Host country: Australia
- City: Gold Coast
- Dates: 10 July 2023–14 July 2023
- Teams: 7 (from 1 confederation)
- Venue: Gold Coast Hockey Centre

Final positions
- Champions: Australia
- Runner-up: New Zealand
- Third place: Fiji

Tournament statistics
- Matches played: 27
- Goals scored: 221 (8.19 per match)
- Top scorer: (New Zealand) Hayley Cox (21 goals)

The 1st Women's Oceania Hockey5s World Cup Qualifier is the first edition of the women's Oceania Hockey5s World Cup Qualifier for the women's Hockey5s event at the FIH Hockey5s World Cup. It was held alongside the Men's tournament in Gold Coast, Australia from 10 to 14 July 2023.

The winner, runner-up and third-placed teams of the tournament all qualify for the 2024 Hockey5s World Cup.

Australia won both the men's and women's Oceania Cup.

== Teams ==
- Australia
- Fiji
- New Zealand
- Papua New Guinea
- Solomon Islands
- Tonga
- Vanuatu

== Results ==
Pos	Team	Pld	W	D	L	GF	GA	GD	Pts	Qualification
1	Australia (H)	6	6	0	0	57	3	+54	18	Final
2	New Zealand	6	5	0	1	55	11	+44	15	Final
3	Fiji	6	4	0	2	27	18	+9	12	Final
4	Papua New Guinea	6	2	1	3	10	35	−25	7	Final
5	Tonga	6	2	0	4	14	31	−17	6	5–7th place semi-finals
6	Vanuatu	6	1	0	5	9	44	−35	3	5–7th place semi-finals
7	Solomon Islands	6	0	1	5	7	37	−30	1	5–7th place semi-finals

Source: FIH
Rules for classification: 1) points; 2) matches won; 3) goal difference; 4) goals for; 5) head-to-head result; 6) field goals for.
(H) Hosts

10 July 2023
15:00

Australia	12–0	Tonga
Gilbar 1', 7', 16', 17'; Kersnovske 4', 15'; Zimmerman 6', 18', 20'; Dooley 7', 11'; Berry 10'	Report

Umpires:
Ateca Fatufago (FIJ)
Lily Isaiah (VAN)

10 July 2023
15:50

New Zealand	13–1	Solomon Islands
Hepi 1', 16'; Cox 1', 8', 9', 11', 12'; Holdich 2', 3'; Makea 4', 5'; Hilton-Jones 15'; Bradley 17'	Report	Hathera 6'

Umpires:
Gabriella Kisapai (PNG)
Iris Milham (AUS)

10 July 2023
16:40

Fiji	6–1	Papua New Guinea
Nautu 2'; Browne 3'; Ravatu 9', 10'; Kumar 9'; Pickering 13'	Report	Terence 11'

Umpires:
Lani Nichol (NZL)
Iris Milham (AUS)

11 July 2023
10:00

New Zealand	11–1	Tonga
Cox 1', 2', 4', 12', 14'; Holdich 5'; Hilton-Jones 10'; Arthur-Worsop 16', 17', 18'; Bradley 19'	Report	Smith 20'

11 July 2023
10:50

Fiji	6–2	Solomon Islands
Pickering 3'; Ravatu 9', 16', 20'; Fabiano 10'; Kumar 12'	Report	Hiro 6'; Bobby 14'

11 July 2023
11:40

Papua New Guinea	5–2	Vanuatu
Terence 8', 10', 14', 20'; Pomoso 20'	Report	Yalou 13', 20'

11 July 2023
15:00

Fiji	3–1	Tonga
Nautu 1'; Fabiano 18'; Ravatu 19'	Report	Tone 20'

11 July 2023
15:50

Papua New Guinea	1–1	Solomon Islands
Terence 2'	Report	Bobby 8'

11 July 2023
16:40

Australia	11–0	Vanuatu
Zimmerman 4', 15', 16'; Kersnovske 5'; Koelmeyer 9'; Dooley 10', 14'; Berry 11'; Morris 17'; Gilbar 19'; Moffat 20'	Report

12 July 2023
12:30

Australia	8–0	Solomon Islands
Morris 4'; Dooley 4'; Zimmerman 5', 20'; Koelmeyer 6'; Moffat 11'; Gilbar 16'; Berry 17'	Report

12 July 2023
13:20

New Zealand	10–0	Papua New Guinea
Makea 2', 10'; Hepi 3'; Arthur-Worsop 5'; Cox 10', 15', 16', 20'; Bradley 11'; Holdich 20'	Report

12 July 2023
14:10

Fiji	9–1	Vanuatu
Fabiano 5'; Browne 6'; Ravatu 10', 16'; Ah Yuk 12', 18'; Bukalidi 14', 18'; Pickering 17'	Report	Kuai 7'

12 July 2023
17:30

Solomon Islands	1–5	Tonga
Bobby 3'	Report	Tohi 1'; Finau 6', 12'; Smith 7', 8'

12 July 2023
18:20

New Zealand	12–1	Vanuatu
Hepi 1', 2', 9'; Cox 4', 7', 9'; Arthur-Worsop 12'; Bradley 13', 14', 15'; Hilton-Jones 18'; Makea 19'	Report	Katawa 4'

12 July 2023
19:10

Australia	6–1	Fiji
Zimmerman 7'; Kersnovske 8'; Koelmeyer 12'; Berry 15'; Dooley 18', 20'	Report	Ravatu 11'

13 July 2023
10:00

Papua New Guinea	3–2	Tonga
Kevan 2'; Kisapai 10+'; Ilumpui 13'	Report	Smith 6', 11'

Umpires:
Lily Isaiah (VAN)
Aaron Wong (FIJ)

13 July 2023
10:50

Australia	6–2	New Zealand
Hanham 10+'; Pawhau 13'; Kersnovske 15', 17'; Koelmeyer 18'; Dooley 20'	Report	Cox 2'; Bradley 4'

Umpires:
Ateca Fatufago (FIJ)
Gabriella Kisapai (PNG)

13 July 2023
11:40

Vanuatu	4–2	Solomon Islands
Hinge 15'; Kalsav Aru 16', 20'; Katawa 18'	Report	Bobby 11', 13'

Umpires:
Iris Milham (AUS)
Lani Nichol (NZL)

13 July 2023
15:00

New Zealand	7–2	Fiji
Hepi 1', 15'; Bradley 10'; Cox 13'; Holdich 16', 17'; Makea 18'	Report	Ravatu 1'; Nautu 18'

Umpires:
Iris Milham (AUS)
Timothy Sheahan (AUS)

13 July 2023
15:50

Tonga	5–1	Vanuatu
L. Smith 2', 7', 14'; A. Smith 11'; K. Tohi 12'	Report	Katawa 17'

Umpires:
Gabriella Kisapai (PNG)
Lani Nichol (NZL)

13 July 2023
16:40

Australia	14–0	Papua New Guinea
Berry 1', 15'; Kersnovske 2', 3', 9', 10', 14'; Zimmerman 4', 6', 19'; Koelmeyer 6'; Gilbar 8', 9'; Moffat 19'	Report

Umpires:
Ateca Fatufago (FIJ)
Lily Isaiah (VAN)

== Fifth to seventh place classification ==
Cross-over
14 July
Vanuatu	1
Solomon Islands	4

Fifth place
14 July
Tonga (p.s.o.)	3 (2)
Solomon Islands	3 (1)

=== Cross-over ===
14 July 2023
09:00

Vanuatu	1–4	Solomon Islands
Kalsav 12'	Report	Hathera 2', 10'; Ghailobo 12'; Hiro 15'

=== Fifth and sixth place ===
14 July 2023
14:00

Tonga	3–3	Solomon Islands
Tohi 5'; L. Smith 16', 19'	Report	Hathera 4', 16'; Bobby 20'
Penalties
Tohi (penalty shoot-out scored); L. Smith (penalty shoot-out scored)	2–1	(penalty shoot-out scored) Ghailobo; (penalty shoot-out missed) Hathera; (penalty shoot-out missed) Bobby

== First to fourth place classification ==
Semi-finals
14 July
New Zealand	6
Fiji	0
14 July
Australia	12
Papua New Guinea	1

Final
14 July
New Zealand	1
Australia	3
Third place
14 July
Fiji	6
Papua New Guinea	2

=== Semi–Final ===
14 July 2023
10:40

New Zealand	6–0	Fiji
Cox 2', 16'; Holdich 5', 12'; Hepi 7'; Arthur-Worsop 16'	Report

14 July 2023
12:20

Australia	12–1	Papua New Guinea
Gilbar 1'; Kersnovske 3', 10'; Morris 3'; Koelmeyer 5', 12', 18'; Moffat 7'; Berry 9'; Zimmerman 11', 18', 19'	Report	Ilumpui 7'

=== Third place game ===
14 July 2023
15:40

Fiji	6–2	Papua New Guinea
Bukalidi 1', 10', 14'; Browne 6'; Ravatu 11'; Kumar 14'	Report	Sisii 17'; Bon 19'

=== Final ===
14 July 2023
17:20

New Zealand	1–3	Australia
Hepi 6'	Report	Kersnovske 2'; Dooley 6', 19'

== Goalscorers ==
There were 221 goals scored in 27 matches, for an average of 8.19 goals per match.

21 goals

- (New Zealand) Hayley Cox

16 goals

- (Australia) Jamie Zimmerman

14 goals

- (Australia) Eva Kersnovske

11 goals

- (Fiji) Lala Ravatu

10 goals

- (Australia) Madeline Dooley
- (Australia) Holly Gilbar
- (New Zealand) Oriwa Hepi

9 goals

- (Tonga) Liana Smith

8 goals

- (Australia) Dacia Koelmeyer
- (New Zealand) Nikayla Bradley
- (New Zealand) Rhiannon Holdich

7 goals

- (Australia) Sienna Berry

6 goals

- (New Zealand) Leah Arthur-Worsop
- (New Zealand) Carissa Makea
- (Papua New Guinea) Nikita Terence
- (Solomon Islands) Miriam Bobby

5 goals

- (Fiji) Lora Bukalidi
- (Solomon Islands) Everlyn Hathera

4 goals

- (Australia) Jessica Moffat

3 goals

- (Australia) Samantha Morris
- (Fiji) Maxine Browne
- (Fiji) Catherine Fabiano
- (Fiji) Divyankar Kumar
- (Fiji) Melba Nautu
- (Fiji) Lucretia Pickering
- (New Zealand) Holly Hilton-Jones
- (Vanuatu) Kathleen Kalsav Aru
- (Vanuatu) Lidia Katawa

2 goals

- (Fiji) Tailah Ah Yuk
- (Papua New Guinea) Lola Ilumpui
- (Solomon Islands) Sally Hiro
- (Tonga) Tilila Finau
- (Tonga) Ashley Smith
- (Vanuatu) Joana Yalou

1 goal

- (Papua New Guinea) Jessica Kevan
- (Papua New Guinea) Ruby Kisapai
- (Papua New Guinea) Georgina Bon
- (Papua New Guinea) Theckla Pomoso
- (Papua New Guinea) Sullyanne Sisii
- (Solomon Islands) Jeremy Ghailobo
- (Tonga) Kalolaine Tohi
- (Tonga) Anastasia Tohi
- (Tonga) Sophy Tohi
- (Tonga) Felila Tone
- (Vanuatu) Rosemary Hinge
- (Vanuatu) Lyn Kuai

Source: FIH

== Final standing ==
Rank	Team
1st place, gold medalist(s)	Australia
2nd place, silver medalist(s)	New Zealand
3rd place, bronze medalist(s)	Fiji
4	Papua New Guinea
5	Tonga
6	Solomon Islands
7	Vanuatu

Qualified for the 2024 World Cup

== See also ==
- 2023 Men's Hockey5s Oceania Cup
