= 2023 Women's FIH Indoor Hockey World Cup =

International hockey event

Tournament details
- Host country: South Africa
- City: Pretoria
- Dates: 5–11 February
- Teams: 12 (from 5 confederations)
- Venue: Heartfelt Arena

Final positions
- Champions: Netherlands (3rd title)
- Runner-up: Austria
- Third place: Czech Republic

Tournament statistics
- Matches played: 40
- Goals scored: 219 (5.48 per match)
- Top scorer: (Netherlands) Donja Zwinkels (17 goals)
- Best player: (Netherlands) Donja Zwinkels
- Best young player: (United States) Reese D'Ariano
- Best goalkeeper: (Czech Republic) Barbora Čecháková

The 2023 Women's Indoor Hockey World Cup was the sixth edition of this tournament and played from 5 to 11 February 2023 in Pretoria, South Africa.

The Netherlands defeated Austria in the final to win their third overall title, while the Czech Republic defeated host South Africa for the bronze medal.

== Qualification ==
All the teams which qualified for the cancelled 2022 edition of the tournament were eligible to participate in the 2023 edition.

Dates	Event	Location	Quotas	Qualifier(s)
15–21 July 2019	2019 Indoor Asia Cup	Chonburi, Thailand	1	Kazakhstan
17–19 January 2020	2020 EuroHockey Indoor Championship	Minsk, Belarus	5	Austria; Belgium; ~~Belarus~~ (Note: Following advice from the International Olympic Committee, Belarus were excluded due to their involvement in the 2022 Russian invasion of Ukraine and were replaced by Australia.); Czech Republic; ~~Germany~~ (Note: Germany withdrew and were replaced by New Zealand.); Netherlands; Ukraine
16–18 April 2021	2021 Indoor Africa Cup	Durban, South Africa	2	South Africa; Namibia
25–27 June 2021	2021 Indoor Pan American Cup	Spring City, United States	2	Canada; United States
9 August 2022	Invitational	—N/a	2	Australia; New Zealand
Total			12	

== First round ==
The schedule was released on 17 October 2022.

All times are local (UTC+2).

=== Pool A ===
Pos	Team	Pld	W	D	L	GF	GA	GD	Pts	Qualification
1	Netherlands	5	5	0	0	29	4	+25	15	Quarter-finals
2	Austria	5	4	0	1	14	12	+2	12	Quarter-finals
3	South Africa (H)	5	2	1	2	12	11	+1	7	Quarter-finals
4	Australia	5	2	0	3	11	16	−5	6	Quarter-finals
5	United States	5	1	1	3	16	11	+5	4	Ninth place game
6	New Zealand	5	0	0	5	6	34	−28	0	Eleventh place game

Source: FIH
Rules for classification: 1) points; 2) matches won; 3) goal difference; 4) goals for; 5) head-to-head result; 6) field goals scored.
(H) Hosts

5 February 2023
08:30

Austria	3–2	South Africa
Buchta 12'; Laginja 25', 38'	Report	O'Connor 7'; De Waal 30'

Umpires:
Diego Barbas (ARG)
Melina Illanes (ARG)

5 February 2023
10:50

Australia	4–2	United States
C. Burns 4', 37'; Economos 10'; Reid 40'	Report	D'Ariano 2', 20'

Umpires:
Lee Barron (ENG)
Ornpimol Kittiteerasopon (THA)

5 February 2023
13:10

Netherlands	10–0	New Zealand
Zwinkels 2', 9', 22', 24', 37'; Van Wijk 16'; Van Erk 20'; Brands 25'; Van 't Hoog 34', 40'	Report

Umpires:
Cathy Wright (WAL)
Lyndal Robertson (RSA)

6 February 2023
16:40

Austria	2–1	United States
Buchta 1'; Czech 19'	Report	D'Ariano 15'

Umpires:
Łukasz Zwierzchowski (POL)
Melina Illanes (ARG)

6 February 2023
19:00

Netherlands	3–1	South Africa
Imhof 6'; Van 't Hoog 27', 33'	Report	Seerane 12'

Umpires:
Adam Barry (AUS)
Emily Carroll (AUS)

6 February 2023
21:20

New Zealand	1–5	Australia
Pearce 19'	Report	Scriven 10', 36'; Field 21', 33'; Murphy 25'

Umpires:
Andrés Ortiz (ESP)
Céline Martin-Schmets (BEL)

7 February 2023
09:40

United States	2–2	South Africa
Miller 14'; Burnett 22'	Report	Fourie 25'; O'Connor 26'

Umpires:
Cathy Wright (WAL)
Rachel Williams (ENG)

7 February 2023
10:50

Australia	0–8	Netherlands
	Report	Imhof 9', 19'; Zwinkels 9', 24', 32', 32'; Van Wijk 22'; De Baat 34'

Umpires:
Ayden Shrives (RSA)
Ornpimol Kittiteerasopon (THA)

7 February 2023
13:10

New Zealand	2–4	Austria
Pearce 7', 9'	Report	Pultar 6'; Bauer 19'; Laginja 20'; Mayer 33'

Umpires:
Cathy Wright (WAL)
Lyndal Robertson (RSA)

8 February 2023
15:30

Austria	1–5	Netherlands
Czech 26'	Report	Brands 12'; Zwinkels 16', 36', 36'; De Baat 34'

Umpires:
Łukasz Zwierzchowski (POL)
Lyndal Robertson (RSA)

8 February 2023
17:50

United States	9–0	New Zealand
Miller 4', 24', 38'; Sparling 7'; Mandato 8', 36'; D'Ariano 10', 22'; Herbine 21'	Report

Umpires:
Céline Martin-Schmets (BEL)
Ornpimol Kittiteerasopon (THA)

8 February 2023
20:10

South Africa	1–0	Australia
Fourie 31'	Report

Umpires:
Sophie Bockelmann (GER)
Melina Illanes (ARG)

9 February 2023
08:30

Netherlands	3–2	United States
Clasener 6'; Van Wijk 26', 40'	Report	D'Ariano 23', 32'

Umpires:
Ornpimol Kittiteerasopon (THA)
Cathy Wright (WAL)

9 February 2023
10:50

South Africa	6–3	New Zealand
Fourie 19'; De Oliveira 26'; O'Connor 27'; Lardant 30'; Brisset 34'; De Waal 40'	Report	Ritchie 31', 37'; Norman 36'

Umpires:
Sophie Bockelmann (GER)
Rachel Williams (ENG)

9 February 2023
13:10

Australia	2–4	Austria
Scriven 4', 30'	Report	Proksch 10'; Laginja 26'; Bauer 30'; Czech 34'

Umpires:
Lyndal Robertson (RSA)
Cathy Wright (WAL)

=== Pool B ===
Pos	Team	Pld	W	D	L	GF	GA	GD	Pts	Qualification
1	Czech Republic	5	4	0	1	26	8	+18	12	Quarter-finals
2	Belgium	5	3	0	2	9	12	−3	9	Quarter-finals
3	Ukraine	5	2	2	1	11	9	+2	8	Quarter-finals
4	Canada	5	1	3	1	10	10	0	6	Quarter-finals
5	Kazakhstan	5	1	2	2	16	23	−7	5	Ninth place game
6	Namibia	5	0	1	4	7	17	−10	1	Eleventh place game

Source: FIH
Rules for classification: 1) points; 2) matches won; 3) goal difference; 4) goals for; 5) head-to-head result; 6) field goals scored.

5 February 2023
15:30

Namibia	3–5	Kazakhstan
Mengo 19'; Van Staden 34'; Schimming 38'	Report	Beisenbay 3'; Bissirova 3', 23'; Lyapina 30'; Lobanova 40'

Umpires:
Narongtuch Subboonsong (THA)
Emily Carroll (AUS)

5 February 2023
17:50

Ukraine	1–1	Canada
Ponomarenko 20'	Report	Lee 27'

Umpires:
Ornpimol Kittiteerasopon (THA)
Cathy Wright (WAL)

5 February 2023
20:10

Czech Republic	6–1	Belgium
Nováková 2'; Kolářová 6'; Laciná 7', 39'; Lehovcová 15', 37'	Report	De Mot 37'

Umpires:
Lyndal Robertson (RSA)
Rachel Williams (ENG)

6 February 2023
09:40

Canada	2–2	Namibia
McCrory 15'; Lee 31'	Report	Gillies 28', 30'

Umpires:
Sean Edwards (ENG)
Cathy Wright (WAL)

6 February 2023
12:00

Czech Republic	8–2	Kazakhstan
Laciná 5', 40'; Nováková 9', 18', 19', 37'; Lehovcová 13'; Babická 28'	Report	Lobanova 7', 26'

Umpires:
Rachel Williams (ENG)
Diego Barbas (ARG)

6 February 2023
14:20

Ukraine	3–0	Belgium
Ponomarenko 4'; Honcharenko 28'; Leonova 34'	Report

Umpires:
Cathy Wright (WAL)
Sophie Bockelmann (GER)

7 February 2023
15:30

Canada	3–2	Czech Republic
McCrory 5'; Wong 6'; Leahy 35'	Report	Kolářová 24'; Babická 37'

Umpires:
Narongtuch Subboonsong (THA)
Ornpimol Kittiteerasopon (THA)

7 February 2023
17:50

Namibia	1–2	Ukraine
Philander 13'	Report	Ponomarenko 5'; Shevchenko 33'

Umpires:
Emily Carroll (AUS)
Melina Illanes (ARG)

7 February 2023
20:10

Kazakhstan	2–5	Belgium
Bissirova 15'; Lobanova 37'	Report	Ronquetti 7', 40'; Delforge 9', 25'; Wagemans 14'

Umpires:
Lyndal Robertson (RSA)
Narongtuch Subboonsong (THA)

8 February 2023
08:30

Czech Republic	4–2	Ukraine
Vorlová 2', 10'; Duchková 38'; Babická 40'	Report	Honcharenko 1', 22'

Umpires:
Lyndal Robertson (RSA)
Ayden Shrives (RSA)

8 February 2023
10:50

Belgium	2–1	Namibia
Delforge 32'; De Mot 40'	Report	Philander 40'

Umpires:
Adam Barry (AUS)
Ornpimol Kittiteerasopon (THA)

8 February 2023
13:10

Kazakhstan	4–4	Canada
Beisenbay 4', 39'; Bissirova 8'; Lobanova 11'	Report	Wong 6'; McCrory 22', 23', 32'

Umpires:
Andrés Ortiz (ESP)
Emily Carroll (AUS)

9 February 2023
15:30

Belgium	1–0	Canada
Barry 28'	Report

Umpires:
Łukasz Zwierzchowski (POL)
Ornpimol Kittiteerasopon (THA)

9 February 2023
16:40

Namibia	0–6	Czech Republic
	Report	Lehovcová 14'; Hájková 17'; Vorlová 34', 36', 40'; Laciná 35'

Umpires:
Lyndal Robertson (RSA)
Sean Edwards (ENG)

9 February 2023
17:50

Ukraine	3–3	Kazakhstan
Ponomarenko 2'; Shevchenko 23'; Leonova 30'	Report	Lobanova 33'; Bissirova 33'; Beisenbay 39'

Umpires:
Ayden Shrives (RSA)
Céline Martin-Schmets (BEL)

== Classification matches ==
=== Eleventh place game ===
10 February 2023
08:30

New Zealand	4–3	Namibia
Norman 22'; Pearce 23', 31', 32'	Report	Kruger 30', 37'; Philander 33'

Umpires:
Ornpimol Kittiteerasopon (THA)
Cathy Wright (WAL)

=== Ninth place game ===
10 February 2023
10:00

United States	5–1	Kazakhstan
Miller 5'; Mandato 7'; D'Ariano 15'; McDonough 29'; Sparling 35'	Report	Bissirova 18'

Umpires:
Narongtuch Subboonsong (THA)
Lyndal Robertson (RSA)

== Second round ==
=== Bracket ===
Quarter-finals
10 February
Netherlands	6
Canada	1
10 February
Belgium	1
South Africa	2
10 February
Austria	3
Ukraine	1
10 February
Czech Republic	6
Australia	0

Semi-finals
11 February
Netherlands	6
South Africa	1
11 February
Austria	1
Czech Republic	0

Final
11 February
Netherlands	7
Austria	0
Third place
11 February
South Africa	1
Czech Republic	3

=== Quarter-finals ===
10 February 2023
13:00

Czech Republic	6–0	Australia
Laciná 1', 35'; Vorlová 25', 38'; Nováková 27', 36'	Report

Umpires:
Cathy Wright (WAL)
Łukasz Zwierzchowski (POL)

10 February 2023
16:00

Austria	3–1	Ukraine
Czech 3'; Bauer 5'; Pultar 32'	Report	Honcharenko 33'

Umpires:
Melina Illanes (ARG)
Céline Martin-Schmets (BEL)

10 February 2023
19:00

Belgium	1–2	South Africa
De Mot 33'	Report	O'Connor 3'; Fourie 20'

Umpires:
Emily Carroll (AUS)
Łukasz Zwierzchowski (POL)

10 February 2023
22:00

Netherlands	6–1	Canada
Van Wijk 15', 18', 30'; Zwinkels 15', 33', 36'	Report	Wong 27'

Umpires:
Ayden Shrives (RSA)
Lyndal Robertson (RSA)

=== Semi-finals ===
11 February 2023
12:30

Austria	1–0	Czech Republic
Pultar 35'	Report

Umpires:
Sophie Bockelmann (GER)
Céline Martin-Schmetz (BEL)

11 February 2023
14:00

Netherlands	6–1	South Africa
Imhof 7'; Van Wijk 10', 24'; Zwinkels 16', 37'; De Baat 38'	Report	De Oliveira 13'

Umpires:
Melina Illanes (ARG)
Rachel Williams (ENG)

=== Third place game ===
11 February 2023
18:30

South Africa	1–3	Czech Republic
Fourie 26'	Report	Lehovcová 10+', 22'; Kolářová 24'

Umpires:
Melina Illanes (ARG)
Emily Carroll (AUS)

=== Final ===
11 February 2023
21:30

Netherlands	7–0	Austria
Van Wijk 3'; Van 't Hoog 5'; Brands 14', 26', 38'; Clasener 32'; De Geus 39'	Report

Umpires:
Andrés Ortiz (ESP)
Sophie Bockelmann (GER)

== Final standings ==
Rank	Team
Gold medal	Netherlands
Silver medal	Austria
Bronze medal	Czech Republic
4	South Africa
5	Belgium
6	Ukraine
7	Australia
8	Canada
9	United States
10	Kazakhstan
11	New Zealand
12	Namibia

== Awards ==
The following awards were given at the conclusion of the tournament.

Award	Player
Player of the tournament	(Netherlands) Donja Zwinkels
Top goalscorer	(Netherlands) Donja Zwinkels
Goalkeeper of the tournament	(Czech Republic) Barbora Čecháková
Young player of the tournament	(United States) Reese D'Ariano

== Goalscorers ==
There were 219 goals scored in 40 matches, for an average of 5.47 goals per match.

17 goals

- (Netherlands) Donja Zwinkels

10 goals

- (Netherlands) Lieke van Wijk

8 goals

- (United States) Reese D'Ariano

7 goals

- (Czech Republic) Kateřina Laciná
- (Czech Republic) Natálie Nováková
- (Czech Republic) Anna Vorlová

6 goals

- (Czech Republic) Adéla Lehovcová
- (Kazakhstan) Alina Bissirova
- (Kazakhstan) Viktoriya Lobanova
- (New Zealand) Kirsten Pearce

5 goals

- (Canada) Samantha McCrory
- (Netherlands) Mabel Brands
- (Netherlands) Eva van 't Hoog
- (South Africa) Tegan Fourie
- (United States) Hannah Miller

4 goals

- (Australia) Emma Scriven
- (Austria) Johanna Czech
- (Austria) Marta Laginja
- (Kazakhstan) Balzhan Beisenbay
- (Netherlands) Pam Imhof
- (South Africa) Jessica O'Connor
- (Ukraine) Olha Honcharenko
- (Ukraine) Oksana Ponomarenko

3 goals

- (Austria) Katharina Bauer
- (Austria) Marianne Pultar
- (Belgium) Laurine Delforge
- (Belgium) France de Mot
- (Canada) Elise Wong
- (Czech Republic) Nikol Babická
- (Czech Republic) Anna Kolářová
- (Namibia) Azaylee Philander
- (Netherlands) Noor de Baat
- (United States) Sydney Mandato

2 goals

- (Australia) Caitlin Burns
- (Australia) Litiana Field
- (Austria) Daria Buchta
- (Belgium) Marie Ronquetti
- (Canada) Alison Lee
- (Namibia) Jaime Gillies
- (Namibia) Jivanka Kruger
- (Netherlands) Tessa Clasener
- (New Zealand) Philippa Norman
- (New Zealand) Deanna Ritchie
- (South Africa) Daniella de Oliveira
- (South Africa) Kayla de Waal
- (Ukraine) Karyna Leonova
- (Ukraine) Yuliia Shevchenko
- (United States) Opal Sparling

1 goal

- (Australia) Samantha Economos
- (Australia) Madeleine Murphy
- (Australia) Emma Reid
- (Austria) Luisa Mayer
- (Austria) Katharina Proksch
- (Belgium) Claire Barry
- (Belgium) Caroline Wagemans
- (Canada) Kathleen Leahy
- (Czech Republic) Lucie Duchková
- (Czech Republic) Natálie Hájková
- (Kazakhstan) Viktoriya Lyapina
- (Namibia) Magreth Mengo
- (Namibia) Kaela Schimming
- (Namibia) Armin van Staden
- (Netherlands) Elin van Erk
- (Netherlands) Anna de Geus
- (South Africa) Laikén Brisset
- (South Africa) Jessica Lardant
- (South Africa) Celia Seerane
- (United States) Abigail Burnett
- (United States) Annika Herbine
- (United States) Anarose McDonough

Source: FIH

== See also ==
- 2023 Men's FIH Indoor Hockey World Cup
