= 2015 Women's Indoor Hockey World Cup =

International competition

Tournament details
- Host country: Germany
- City: Leipzig
- Teams: 12
- Venue: Arena Leipzig

Final positions
- Champions: Netherlands (2nd title)
- Runner-up: Germany
- Third place: Czech Republic

Tournament statistics
- Matches played: 46
- Goals scored: 314 (6.83 per match)
- Top scorer: (Netherlands) Denise Admiraal (13 goals)
- Best player: (Germany) Katharina Otte

The 2015 Women's Indoor Hockey World Cup was the fourth edition of this tournament. It was played on 4–8 February 2015 in Leipzig, Germany.

The Netherlands defeated Germany after penalties in the final to win their second title.

== Results ==
The schedule was released on 10 October 2014.

All times are Central European Time (UTC+02:00)

=== First round ===
==== Pool A ====
Pos	Team	Pld	W	D	L	GF	GA	GD	Pts	Qualification
1	Germany (H)	5	5	0	0	33	7	+26	15	Advanced to Quarter-finals
2	Australia	5	4	0	1	15	13	+2	12	Advanced to Quarter-finals
3	Austria	5	2	1	2	9	17	−8	7	Advanced to Quarter-finals
4	Ukraine	5	1	2	2	18	20	−2	5	Advanced to Quarter-finals
5	Canada	5	0	2	3	8	18	−10	2	
6	Belgium	5	0	1	4	12	20	−8	1	

Source: FIH
Rules for classification: 1) points; 2) matches won; 3) goal difference; 4) goals for; 5) head-to-head result; 6) field goals scored.
(H) Hosts

4 February 2015
10:15

Austria	1–0	Canada
Vukovich 23'	Report

Umpires:
Stephanie Judefind (USA)
Melina Illanes (ARG)

4 February 2015
11:15

Ukraine	2–4	Australia
Vynohradova 11', 36'	Report	Evans 14'; McLeish 22'; Fey 27'; Plumb 40'

Umpires:
Irene Clelland (SCO)
Violeta Eismayer (AUT)

4 February 2015
11:30

Germany	4–1	Belgium
Hillmann 13'; Wilde 17'; Schröder 17'; Van Bodegom 21'	Report	Motte 36'

Umpires:
Tatyana Kaltypan (UKR)
Ana Faias (POR)

4 February 2015
16:30

Austria	2–3	Australia
Busch 3'; Vukovich 38'	Report	McLeish 8'; Boucher 18'; Evans 31'

Umpires:
Frances Block (ENG)
Michelle Meister (GER)

4 February 2015
18:45

Belgium	4–7	Ukraine
Vouche 15'; Closset 30', 35', 37'	Report	Vynohradova 17', 20', 23', 31'; Sitalo 32'; Vorushylo 38', 39'

Umpires:
Elena Eskina (RUS)
Melina Illanes (ARG)

4 February 2015
19:00

Germany	8–1	Canada
Otte 1', 3'; Hillmann 4', 31', 33'; Steindor 24'; Haase 28'; Wilde 34'	Report	Thompson 30'

Umpires:
Claire Druijts (NED)
Irene Clelland (SCO)

5 February 2015
09:00

Belgium	2–3	Austria
Vouche 5'; Closset 36'	Report	C. Lenzinger 17'; Vukovich 30', 31'

Umpires:
Irene Clelland (SCO)
Melanie Craig (AUS)

5 February 2015
11:15

Australia	3–1	Canada
Plumb 3'; Riordan 23', 36'	Report	Shier 27'

Umpires:
Annie Thomas (MAS)
Ana Faias (POR)

5 February 2015
11:30

Ukraine	3–6	Germany
Khilko 12'; Vorushylo 24'; Shevchenko 37'	Report	Windfeder 9', 20'; Otte 17'; Hillmann 23'; Haase 38'; Steindor 40'

Umpires:
Frances Block (ENG)
Claire Druijts (NED)

5 February 2015
17:30

Australia	4–3	Belgium
Potts 9', 31'; Evans 15'; Gray 37'	Report	Closset 33', 35', 40'

Umpires:
Violeta Eismayer (AUT)
Melina Illanes (ARG)

5 February 2015
18:45

Canada	4–4	Ukraine
Thompson 6', 7'; Watson 15'; Houle 25'	Report	Vorushylo 3', 5'; Shevchenko 8'; Khilko 24'

Umpires:
Michelle Meister (GER)
Annie Thomas (MAS)

5 February 2015
19:00

Austria	1–10	Germany
Vukovich 20'	Report	Hillmann 5', 33'; Steindor 13'; Wilde 14'; Van Bodegom 15'; Hauke 18'; Schröder 24'; Haase 34', 35', 36'

Umpires:
Elena Eskina (RUS)
Tatyana Kaltypan (UKR)

6 February 2015
08:45

Canada	2–2	Belgium
Thompson 28'; Watson 36'	Report	Vouche 14'; Closset 34'

Umpires:
Melina Illanes (ARG)
Melanie Craig (AUS)

6 February 2015
09:00

Ukraine	2–2	Austria
Khilko 31', 32'	Report	Vukovich 28'; Steyrer 39'

Umpires:
Stephanie Judefind (USA)
Claire Druijts (NED)

6 February 2015
11:30

Germany	5–1	Australia
Schröder 15', 16'; Windfeder 23'; Van Bodegom 25', 35'	Report	McLeish 20'

Umpires:
Frances Block (ENG)
Ana Faias (POR)

==== Pool B ====
Pos	Team	Pld	W	D	L	GF	GA	GD	Pts	Qualification
1	Netherlands	5	5	0	0	50	6	+44	15	Advanced to Quarter-finals
2	Belarus	5	3	1	1	28	14	+14	10	Advanced to Quarter-finals
3	Czech Republic	5	3	0	2	21	20	+1	9	Advanced to Quarter-finals
4	Poland	5	2	1	2	19	14	+5	7	Advanced to Quarter-finals
5	South Africa	5	0	1	4	9	40	−31	1	
6	Kazakhstan	5	0	1	4	10	43	−33	1	

Source: FIH
Rules for classification: 1) points; 2) matches won; 3) goal difference; 4) goals for; 5) head-to-head result; 6) field goals scored.

4 February 2015
08:45

Netherlands	14–0	South Africa
Collot 12', 26', 27'; De. Admiraal 15', 19', 22', 39', 40'; Hulsen 17', 18'; Leurink 24'; Vorstenbosch 29'; Verhage 39'; Den Ouden 40'	Report

Umpires:
Michelle Meister (GER)
Annie Thomas (MAS)

4 February 2015
09:00

Czech Republic	3–2	Poland
Reinosová 17'; Bížová 27'; Laciná 33'	Report	Okaj 37', 39'

Umpires:
Frances Block (ENG)
Elena Eskina (RUS)

4 February 2015
10:00

Belarus	6–3	Kazakhstan
Shyntar 6', 9', 21'; Mikheichyk 8'; Papkova 11', 40'; Kurhanskaya 30'	Report	Sazontova 3'; Domashineva 21'; Gataulina 38'

Umpires:
Claire Druijts (NED)
Melanie Craig (AUS)

4 February 2015
16:15

Belarus	3–3	Poland
Mikheichyk 4', 35'; Batura 28'	Report	Wiśniewska 2', 19', 20'

Umpires:
Annie Thomas (MAS)
Tatyana Kaltypan (UKR)

4 February 2015
17:30

South Africa	3–5	Czech Republic
Stella 11'; Walters 17'; Hack 22'	Report	Kindlova 3'; Laciná 28', 37'; Mejzlíková 37'; Bížová 40'

Umpires:
Violeta Eismayer (AUT)
Melanie Craig (AUS)

4 February 2015
17:45

Netherlands	15–0	Kazakhstan
De. Admiraal 6', 13', 26', 35'; Muyselaar 8', 38'; Van Nes 9', 18', 29'; Verhage 10', 34'; Vorstenbosch 15'; Da. Admiraal 24'; Hulsen 30', 40'	Report

Umpires:
Stephanie Judefind (USA)
Ana Faias (POR)

5 February 2015
08:45

Poland	6–1	Kazakhstan
Hawrot 12'; Wieloch 16'; Wisniewska 20'; Slawinska 29'; Katerla 37'; Rybacha 40'	Report	Gataulina 13'

Umpires:
Michelle Meister (GER)
Violeta Eismayer (AUT)

5 February 2015
10:00

Czech Republic	2–7	Netherlands
Bížová 24'; Kolářová 35'	Report	D'Escury 2', 11'; Vorstenbosch 20'; Leurink 22'; De. Admiraal 29'; Hulsen 33', 37'

Umpires:
Elena Eskina (RUS)
Tatyana Kaltypan (UKR)

5 February 2015
10:15

South Africa	0–11	Belarus
	Report	Mikheichyk 2', 23', 31', 33'; Papkova 7', 8', 10', 16', 39'; Silitskaya 28'; Kurhanskaya 30'

Umpires:
Stephanie Judefind (USA)
Melina Illanes (ARG)

5 February 2015
16:15

Kazakhstan	1–11	Czech Republic
Gataulina 39'	Report	Laciná 5', 8', 9', 13'; Mejzlíková 7', 8', 38'; Capouchová 28'; Dukátová 32'; Reichlová 5'; Bížová 36'

Umpires:
Irene Clelland (SCO)
Stephanie Judefind (USA)

5 February 2015
16:30

Belarus	1–8	Netherlands
Mikheichyk 7'	Report	Verhage 5'; Van Nes 17', 30', 40'; Hulsen 28', 38', 39'; Vorstenbosch 35'

Umpires:
Frances Block (ENG)
Ana Faias (POR)

5 February 2015
17:45

Poland	5–1	South Africa
Wiśniewska 17', 18'; Rybacha 24'; Wieloch 38'; Walasek 40'	Report	Evans 20'

Umpires:
Claire Druijts (NED)
Melanie Craig (AUS)

6 February 2015
10:00

Netherlands	6–3	Poland
Verhage 6', 14'; Hulsen 13', 39'; De. Admiraal 21'; Muyselaar 22'	Report	Hawrot 28', 35'; Walasek 40'

Umpires:
Elena Eskina (RUS)
Violeta Eismayer (AUT)

6 February 2015
10:15

Kazakhstan	5–5	South Africa
Domashineva 4', 23'; Mukasheva 12'; Sazontova 19'; Gataulina 33'	Report	O'Connor 10', 32'; Hack 16'; Martens 20'; Evans 27'

Umpires:
Tatyana Kaltypan (UKR)
Annie Thomas (MAS)

6 February 2015
11:15

Czech Republic	0–7	Belarus
	Report	Mikheichyk 2'; Bahushevich 13', 20'; Papkova 14', 28', 38'; Kurhanskaya 40'

Umpires:
Michelle Meister (GER)
Irene Clelland (SCO)

=== Classification round ===
==== Ninth to twelfth place classification ====
Crossover
6 February
Canada	4
Kazakhstan	1
6 February
South Africa (p.s.o.)	2 (3)
Belgium	2 (1)

Ninth place
7 February
Canada	2
South Africa	4
Eleventh place
7 February
Kazakhstan	5
Belgium	6

===== Crossover =====
6 February 2015
16:15

Canada	4–1	Kazakhstan
Thompson 16'; O'Neale 30'; Lee 39'; Mitchell 40'	Report	Mukasheva 39'

Umpires:
Tatyana Kaltypan (UKR)
Melanie Craig (AUS)

6 February 2015
17:45

South Africa	2–2	Belgium
Evans 28'; O'Connor 30'	Report	Ronquetti 4'; Closset 20'
Penalties
Madsen (penalty shoot-out scored); Evans (penalty shoot-out scored); Higgo (penalty shoot-out scored)	3–1	(penalty shoot-out scored) Ronquetti; (penalty shoot-out missed) Delforge

Umpires:
Annie Thomas (MAS)
Violeta Eismayer (AUT)

===== Eleventh and twelfth place =====
7 February 2015
11:45

Kazakhstan	5–6	Belgium
Sazontova 24'; Domashineva 26', 31'; Gataulina 29', 36'	Report	Delforge 9'; Motte 12', 32'; Vouche 20'; Ronquetti 38', 39'

Umpires:
Elena Eskina (RUS)
Tatyana Kaltypan (UKR)

===== Ninth and tenth place =====
7 February 2015
13:15

Canada	2–4	South Africa
Watson 15'; Hapuarachchi 16'	Report	Stella 14', 20'; Walters 32', 40'

Umpires:
Frances Block (ENG)
Melina Illanes (ARG)

=== Medal round ===
Quarter-finals
6 February
Germany	2
Poland	1
6 February
Belarus	3 (1)
Austria (p.s.o.)	3 (2)
6 February
Australia	3
Czech Republic	4
6 February
Netherlands	2
Ukraine	0

Semi-finals
7 February
Germany	7
Austria	0
7 February
Czech Republic	1
Netherlands	3

Final
8 February
Germany	1 (0)
Netherlands (p.s.o.)	1 (1)
Third place
8 February
Austria	0 (0)
Czech Republic (p.s.o.)	0 (2)

==== Quarter-finals ====
6 February 2015
16:30

Australia	3–4	Czech Republic
Watson 6'; Potts 12'; Chau 38'	Report	Reinosová 1', 26'; Mejzlíková 4', 17'

Umpires:
Elena Eskina (RUS)
Stephanie Judefind (USA)

6 February 2015
18:00

Belarus	3–3	Austria
Shyntar 31', 37'; Mikheichyk 33'	Report	Laginja 14'; Vukovich 19', 26'
Penalties
Papkova (penalty shoot-out scored); Kurhanskaya (penalty shoot-out missed); Bahushevich (penalty shoot-out missed)	1–2	(penalty shoot-out scored) Steyrer; (penalty shoot-out missed) Vukovich; (penalty shoot-out scored) Busch

Umpires:
Michelle Meister (GER)
Claire Druijts (NED)

6 February 2015
19:30

Germany	2–1	Poland
Otte 23'; Hillmann 32'	Report	Okaj 5'

Umpires:
Irene Clelland (SCO)
Ana Faias (POR)

6 February 2015
21:00

Netherlands	2–0	Ukraine
Den Ouden 38'; Vorstenbosch 40'	Report

Umpires:
Frances Block (ENG)
Melina Illanes (ARG)

==== Fifth to eighth place classification ====
Crossover
7 February
Poland	3
Belarus	2
7 February
Australia	3 (1)
Ukraine (p.s.o.)	3 (2)

Fifth place
8 February
Poland	7
Ukraine	3
Seventh place
8 February
Belarus	3
Australia	1

===== Crossover =====
7 February 2015
08:45

Poland	3–2	Belarus
Okaj 6'; Wieloch 10'; Wisniewska 15'	Report	Papkova 2', 24'

Umpires:
Melanie Craig (AUS)
Violeta Eismayer (AUT)

7 February 2015
10:15

Australia	3–3	Ukraine
Fey 19'; Boucher 22'; Riordan 33'	Report	Khilko 10', 14'; Liashenko 38'
Penalties
Evans (penalty shoot-out missed); Chau (penalty shoot-out missed); McLeish (penalty shoot-out scored)	1–2	(penalty shoot-out missed) Khilko; (penalty shoot-out scored) Vynohradova; (penalty shoot-out scored) Sitalo

Umpires:
Ana Faias (POR)
Annie Thomas (MAS)

===== Seventh and eighth place =====
8 February 2015
10:15

Belarus	3–1	Australia
Shyntar 27', 31'; Kurhanskaya 37'	Report	Gray 7'

Umpires:
Claire Druijts (NED)
Melina Illanes (ARG)

===== Fifth and sixth place =====
8 February 2015
11:45

Poland	7–3	Ukraine
Katerla 4'; Sztybrych 16', 28'; Okaj 19'; Walasek 25'; Hawrot 32'; Rybacha 34'	Report	Khilko 10'; Vorushylo 36'; Kernoz 39'

Umpires:
Stephanie Judefind (USA)
Irene Clelland (SCO)

==== First to fourth place classification ====
===== Semi-finals =====
7 February 2015
16:00

Germany	7–0	Austria
Hauke 8'; Otte 11', 20'; Schröder 14'; Windfeder 16'; Hillmann 21'; Van Bodegom 31'	Report

Umpires:
Claire Druijts (NED)
Irene Clelland (SCO)

7 February 2015
17:30

Czech Republic	1–3	Netherlands
Bížová 29'	Report	Hulsen 4'; De. Admiraal 22', 32'

Umpires:
Michelle Meister (GER)
Stephanie Judefind (USA)

===== Third and fourth place =====
8 February 2015
10:00

Austria	0–0	Czech Republic
	Report
Penalties
Steyrer (penalty shoot-out missed); Vukovich (penalty shoot-out missed)	0–2	(penalty shoot-out missed) Bížová; (penalty shoot-out scored) Laciná; (penalty shoot-out scored) Reinosová

Umpires:
Michelle Meister (GER)
Ana Faias (POR)

===== Final =====
8 February 2015
13:00

Germany	1–1	Netherlands
Otte 8'	Report	Verhage 38'
Penalties
Hillmann (penalty shoot-out missed); Steindor (penalty shoot-out missed); Hauke (penalty shoot-out missed)	0–1	(penalty shoot-out missed) Vorstenbosch; (penalty shoot-out scored) Leurink

Umpires:
Frances Block (ENG)
Elena Eskina (RUS)

== Final standings ==
As per statistical convention in field hockey, matches decided in extra time are counted as wins and losses, while matches decided by penalty shoot-outs are counted as draws.

Pos	Grp	Team	Pld	W	D	L	GF	GA	GD	Pts	Final result
1	B	Netherlands	8	7	1	0	56	8	+48	22	Gold medal
2	A	Germany (H)	8	7	1	0	43	9	+34	22	Silver medal
3	B	Czech Republic	8	4	1	3	26	26	0	13	Bronze medal
4	A	Austria	8	2	3	3	12	27	−15	9	
5	B	Poland	8	4	1	3	30	21	+9	13	
6	A	Ukraine	8	1	3	4	24	32	−8	6	
7	B	Belarus	8	4	2	2	36	21	+15	14	
8	A	Australia	8	4	1	3	22	23	−1	13	
9	B	South Africa	7	1	2	4	15	44	−29	5	
10	A	Canada	7	1	2	4	14	23	−9	5	
11	A	Belgium	7	1	2	4	20	27	−7	5	
12	B	Kazakhstan	7	0	1	6	16	53	−37	1	

Source: FIH
(H) Hosts

== Awards ==
The following awards were presented at the conclusion of the tournament:

Most Valuable Player	Top Goalscorer	Goalkeeper of the Tournament	U–21 Player of the Tournament
(Germany) Katharina Otte	(Netherlands) Denise Admiraal	(Germany) Yvonne Frank	(Germany) Anne Schröder

== Goalscorers ==
There were 314 goals scored in 46 matches, for an average of 6.83 goals per match.

13 goals

- (Netherlands) Denise Admiraal

12 goals

- (Belarus) Krestina Papkova
- (Netherlands) Lieke Hulsen

10 goals

- (Belarus) Yuliya Mikheichyk

9 goals

- (Belgium) Céline Closset
- (Germany) Kristina Hillmann

8 goals

- (Austria) Kristine Vukovich

7 goals

- (Czech Republic) Kateřina Laciná
- (Germany) Katharina Otte
- (Netherlands) Claire Verhage
- (Poland) Natalia Wiśniewska
- (Ukraine) Maryna Khilko

6 goals

- (Belarus) Volha Shyntar
- (Czech Republic) Tereza Mejzlíková
- (Kazakhstan) Natalya Gataulina
- (Netherlands) Pauline van Nes
- (Ukraine) Yana Vorushylo
- (Ukraine) Maryna Vynohradova

5 goals

- (Canada) Madison Thompson
- (Czech Republic) Adéla Bížová
- (Germany) Charlotte van Bodegom
- (Germany) Lydia Haase
- (Germany) Anne Schröder
- (Kazakhstan) Vera Domashineva
- (Netherlands) Kiki Collot D'Escury
- (Netherlands) Vera Vorstenbosch
- (Poland) Paulina Okaj

4 goals

- (Belarus) Yuliya Kurhanskaya
- (Belgium) Morgane Vouche
- (Germany) Katharina Windfeder
- (Poland) Joanna Hawrot

3 goals

- (Australia) Holly Evans
- (Australia) Emma McLeish
- (Australia) Makaela Potts
- (Australia) Emily Riordan
- (Belgium) Perrine Motte
- (Belgium) Marie Ronquetti
- (Canada) Kaelan Watson
- (Czech Republic) Adéla Reinosová
- (Germany) Luisa Steindor
- (Germany) Céline Wilde
- (Kazakhstan) Natalya Sazontova
- (Netherlands) Mila Muyselaar
- (Poland) Marlena Rybacha
- (Poland) Oriana Wałasek
- (Poland) Joanna Wieloch
- (South Africa) Celia Evans
- (South Africa) Jessica O'Connor
- (South Africa) Kara-Lee Stella
- (South Africa) Eloise Walters

2 goals

- (Australia) Tegan Boucher
- (Australia) Ashlea Fey
- (Australia) Kyah Gray
- (Australia) Kizziah Plumb
- (Belarus) Sviatlana Bahushevich
- (Germany) Franziska Hauke
- (Kazakhstan) Assel Mukasheva
- (Netherlands) Karin den Ouden
- (Netherlands) Laurien Leurink
- (Poland) Amelia Katerla
- (Poland) Małgorzata Sztybrych
- (South Africa) Cindy Hack
- (Ukraine) Yuliia Shevchenko

1 goal

- (Australia) Yeuk Chau
- (Australia) Shelley Watson
- (Austria) Julia Busch
- (Austria) Marta Laginja
- (Austria) Catherine Lenzinger
- (Austria) Lisa Steyrer
- (Belarus) Ryta Batura
- (Belarus) Nadzeya Silitskaya
- (Belgium) Laurine Delforge
- (Canada) Malinda Hapuarachchi
- (Canada) Erin Houle
- (Canada) Alison Lee
- (Canada) Jocelyn Mitchell
- (Canada) Kyesia O'Neale
- (Canada) Kristen Shier
- (Czech Republic) Renata Capouchová
- (Czech Republic) Kamila Dukátová
- (Czech Republic) Klára Kindlová
- (Czech Republic) Anna Kolářová
- (Czech Republic) Jindřiška Reichlová
- (Netherlands) Daphne Admiraal
- (Poland) Paula Sławińska
- (South Africa) Tracy Martens
- (Ukraine) Yevheniya Kernoz
- (Ukraine) Halyna Liashenko
- (Ukraine) Yana Sitalo

Source: FIH
