= 2025 Women's FIH Indoor Hockey World Cup =

Indoor hockey tournament in Croatia

Tournament details
- Host country: Croatia
- City: Poreč
- Dates: 3–9 February
- Teams: 12 (from 5 confederations)
- Venue: Žatika Sport Centre

Final positions
- Champions: Poland (1st title)
- Runner-up: Austria
- Third place: Czech Republic

Tournament statistics
- Matches played: 34
- Goals scored: 199 (5.85 per match)
- Top scorer: (Germany) Ines Wanner (14 goals)
- Best player: (Poland) Marlena Rybacha
- Best young player: (United States) Reese D'Ariano
- Best goalkeeper: (Thailand) Somlak Suttiprapa

The 2025 Women's FIH Indoor Hockey World Cup was the seventh edition of the Women's Indoor Hockey World Cup. It was held at the Žatika Sport Centre in Poreč, Croatia from 3 to 9 February 2025.

Poland defeated Austria in the final to win their first title.

== Qualification ==
The host qualified automatically and the top performer at each continental qualifications.

| Dates | Event | Location | Quotas | Qualifier(s) |
|---|---|---|---|---|
| 8–11 February 2024 | 2024 EuroHockey Championship | Berlin, Germany | 5 | Austria; Belgium; Czech Republic; Germany; Poland; ~~Spain~~ (Note: Spain withdrew and were replaced by New Zealand.) |
| 18–22 March 2024 | 2024 Pan American Cup | Calgary, Canada | 1 | United States |
| 27 March 2024 | Host nation | —N/a | 1 | Croatia |
| 12–16 May 2024 | 2024 Asia Cup | Chonburi, Thailand | 1 | Thailand |
| 23–26 May 2024 | 2024 Africa Cup | Swakopmund, Namibia | 2 | Namibia; South Africa |
| 24–26 June 2024 | 2024 Oceania Indoor World Cup qualifier | Canberra, Australia | 2 | Australia; New Zealand |
| Total | | | 12 | |

== First round ==
The eight highest ranked teams at the conclusion of the pool stage advanced to the quarter-finals, while the remaining four teams progressed to the classification round.

All times are local (UTC+1).

=== Pool A ===
| Pos | Team | Pld | W | D | L | GF | GA | GD | Pts |
|---|---|---|---|---|---|---|---|---|---|
| 1 | Czech Republic | 3 | 3 | 0 | 0 | 15 | 6 | +9 | 9 |
| 2 | Belgium | 3 | 1 | 1 | 1 | 10 | 8 | +2 | 4 |
| 3 | United States | 3 | 1 | 1 | 1 | 10 | 9 | +1 | 4 |
| 4 | Croatia (H) | 3 | 0 | 0 | 3 | 5 | 17 | −12 | 0 |

Source: FIH
Rules for classification: 1) points; 2) matches won; 3) goal difference; 4) goals for; 5) head-to-head result; 6) field goals scored.
(H) Hosts

3 February 2025
20:30

| Belgium | 7–1 | Croatia |
|---|---|---|
| Gose-Claessens 8', 10', 21', 29'; Ronquetti 19'; Vincent 27'; Peeters 32' | Report | Čepo 21' |

Umpires:
Zeke Newman (AUS)
Kristy Robertson (AUS)

3 February 2025
21:40

| Czech Republic | 5–3 | United States |
|---|---|---|
| Babická 10'; Kolářová 17'; Lehovcová 27'; Vorlová 28', 32' | Report | D'Ariano 3'; Matson 5', 40+' |

Umpires:
Michael Pontus (BEL)
Ana Ortega (ESP)

4 February 2025
19:40

| United States | 6–3 | Croatia |
|---|---|---|
| Bruder 5'; D'Ariano 6', 13'; Herbine 19'; Matson 35', 39' | Report | Čepo 8', 39'; Nizek 40' |

Umpires:
Pieter Hembrecht (NED)
Emily Carroll (AUS)

4 February 2025
21:00

| Belgium | 2–6 | Czech Republic |
|---|---|---|
| Gose-Claessens 1'; Delforge 36' | Report | Lehovcová 6', 13', 34'; Nováková 7'; Babická 34'; Duchková 38' |

Umpires:
Michelle Meister (GER)
Abby MacArthur (WAL)

5 February 2025
17:00

| United States | 1–1 | Belgium |
|---|---|---|
| Matson 19' | Report | Peeters 5' |

Umpires:
Ivona Makar (CRO)
Ayden Shrives (RSA)

5 February 2025
18:20

| Czech Republic | 4–1 | Croatia |
|---|---|---|
| Lehovcová 1', 16'; Laciná 5'; Duchková 39' | Report | Šomin 38' |

Umpires:
Melina Illanes (ARG)
Rachel Williams (ENG)

=== Pool B ===
| Pos | Team | Pld | W | D | L | GF | GA | GD | Pts |
|---|---|---|---|---|---|---|---|---|---|
| 1 | Poland | 3 | 2 | 1 | 0 | 6 | 3 | +3 | 7 |
| 2 | Austria | 3 | 1 | 1 | 1 | 12 | 3 | +9 | 4 |
| 3 | Thailand | 3 | 1 | 1 | 1 | 6 | 6 | 0 | 4 |
| 4 | South Africa | 3 | 0 | 1 | 2 | 6 | 18 | −12 | 1 |

Source: FIH
Rules for classification: 1) points; 2) matches won; 3) goal difference; 4) goals for; 5) head-to-head result; 6) field goals scored.

3 February 2025
10:50

| Austria | 1–1 | Poland |
|---|---|---|
| Kern 29' | Report | Chmiel 36' |

Umpires:
Abby MacArthur (WAL)
Kristy Robertson (AUS)

3 February 2025
12:00

| South Africa | 4–4 | Thailand |
|---|---|---|
| Hamza 6'; Den Bakker 10'; T. Fourie 16'; Lardant 29' | Report | Tongkham 1'; Todkaew 20', 23'; Losantia 33' |

Umpires:
Michelle Meister (GER)
Ana Ortega (ESP)

4 February 2025
12:10

| Poland | 1–0 | Thailand |
|---|---|---|
| Chmiel 2' | Report |

Umpires:
Zeke Newman (AUS)
Ana Ortega (ESP)

4 February 2025
13:30

| South Africa | 0–10 | Austria |
|---|---|---|
| | Report | Czech 2'; Buchta 5', 9'; Proksch 12'; Bauer 20', 24', 33'; Kern 23', 39'; Felber 38' |

Umpires:
Kristy Robertson (AUS)
Salman (INA)

6 February 2025
09:30

| Austria | 1–2 | Thailand |
|---|---|---|
| Proksch 14' | Report | Todkaew 4'; Losantia 32' |

Umpires:
Michael Pontus (BEL)
Zeke Newman (AUS)

6 February 2025
10:50

| Poland | 4–2 | South Africa |
|---|---|---|
| Chmiel 3'; Balcerzak 23'; Rybacha 28'; Zimmermann 34' | Report | De Waal 12'; Lardant 38' |

Umpires:
Pieter Hembrecht (NED)
Ivona Makar (CRO)

=== Pool C ===
| Pos | Team | Pld | W | D | L | GF | GA | GD | Pts |
|---|---|---|---|---|---|---|---|---|---|
| 1 | Germany | 3 | 3 | 0 | 0 | 24 | 2 | +22 | 9 |
| 2 | Namibia | 3 | 2 | 0 | 1 | 11 | 10 | +1 | 6 |
| 3 | Australia | 3 | 1 | 0 | 2 | 4 | 10 | −6 | 3 |
| 4 | New Zealand | 3 | 0 | 0 | 3 | 1 | 18 | −17 | 0 |

Source: FIH
Rules for classification: 1) points; 2) matches won; 3) goal difference; 4) goals for; 5) head-to-head result; 6) field goals scored.

3 February 2025
15:30

| Australia | 2–3 | Namibia |
|---|---|---|
| Hughes 1'; Tevant 21' | Report | Myburgh 14', 31'; Kruger 38' |

Umpires:
Ben Göntgen (GER)
Rachel Williams (ENG)

3 February 2025
16:40

| Germany | 9–1 | New Zealand |
|---|---|---|
| Kiefer 6'; Bolle 7', 9'; Wanner 10', 19', 23', 31', 39'; Martin-Pelegrina 34' | Report | Pearce 37' |

Umpires:
Melina Illanes (ARG)
Emily Carroll (AUS)

5 February 2025
12:10

| Namibia | 7–0 | New Zealand |
|---|---|---|
| Meyer 18'; Ja. Kruger 19'; Philander 27'; Ji. Kruger 27', 34'; Myburgh 37', 38' | Report |

Umpires:
Sean Edwards (ENG)
Emily Carroll (AUS)

5 February 2025
13:30

| Germany | 7–0 | Australia |
|---|---|---|
| Wanner 7', 14', 20'; Gräve 9'; Bolle 10'; Köllinger 15'; Poppe 33' | Report |

Umpires:
Abby MacArthur (WAL)
Salman (INA)

6 February 2025
12:10

| Australia | 2–0 | New Zealand |
|---|---|---|
| Welsh 3', 29' | Report |

Umpires:
Ayden Shrives (RSA)
Salman (INA)

6 February 2025
13:30

| Namibia | 1–8 | Germany |
|---|---|---|
| Philander 39' | Report | Martin-Pelegrina 5'; Wanner 6', 26'; Weber 16'; Kiefer 20'; Bolle 29', 30', 36' |

Umpires:
Abby MacArthur (WAL)
Łukasz Zwierzchowski (POL)

=== Ranking of teams ===
| Pos | Team | Pld | W | D | L | GF | GA | GD | Pts | Qualification |
|---|---|---|---|---|---|---|---|---|---|---|
| 1 | Germany | 3 | 3 | 0 | 0 | 24 | 2 | +22 | 9 | Quarter-finals |
| 2 | Czech Republic | 3 | 3 | 0 | 0 | 15 | 6 | +9 | 9 | Quarter-finals |
| 3 | Poland | 3 | 2 | 1 | 0 | 6 | 3 | +3 | 7 | Quarter-finals |
| 4 | Namibia | 3 | 2 | 0 | 1 | 11 | 10 | +1 | 6 | Quarter-finals |
| 5 | Austria | 3 | 1 | 1 | 1 | 12 | 3 | +9 | 4 | Quarter-finals |
| 6 | Belgium | 3 | 1 | 1 | 1 | 10 | 8 | +2 | 4 | Quarter-finals |
| 7 | United States | 3 | 1 | 1 | 1 | 10 | 9 | +1 | 4 | Quarter-finals |
| 8 | Thailand | 3 | 1 | 1 | 1 | 6 | 6 | 0 | 4 | Quarter-finals |
| 9 | Australia | 3 | 1 | 0 | 2 | 4 | 10 | −6 | 3 | |
| 10 | South Africa | 3 | 0 | 1 | 2 | 6 | 18 | −12 | 1 | |
| 11 | Croatia (H) | 3 | 0 | 0 | 3 | 5 | 17 | −12 | 0 | |
| 12 | New Zealand | 3 | 0 | 0 | 3 | 1 | 18 | −17 | 0 | |

Source: FIH
Rules for classification: 1) points; 2) matches won; 3) goal difference; 4) goals for; 5) head-to-head result; 6) field goals scored.
(H) Hosts

== Classification round ==
=== Bracket ===
Crossover
7 February
Australia | 3
New Zealand | 1
7 February
South Africa | 6
Croatia | 0

Ninth place
8 February
Australia | 2
South Africa | 3
Eleventh place
8 February
New Zealand | 3
Croatia | 2

=== Crossover ===
7 February 2025
10:50

| Australia | 3–1 | New Zealand |
|---|---|---|
| C. Burns 15'; Welsh 24'; Jackat 26' | Report | Sheild 13' |

Umpires:
Ivona Makar (CRO)
Rachel Williams (ENG)

7 February 2025
12:00

| South Africa | 6–0 | Croatia |
|---|---|---|
| Hamza 13'; De Oliveira 23'; Den Bakker 30'; T. Fourie 33'; De Waal 39', 40' | Report |

Umpires:
Melina Illanes (ARG)
Łukasz Zwierzchowski (POL)

=== Eleventh and twelfth place ===
8 February 2025
09:00

| New Zealand | 3–2 | Croatia |
|---|---|---|
| Pearce 30'; Sheild 32'; Brun 34' | Report | Čepo 39', 40+' |

Umpires:
Salman (INA)
Kristy Robertson (AUS)

=== Ninth and tenth place ===
8 February 2025
10:10

| Australia | 2–3 | South Africa |
|---|---|---|
| Zimmerman 25'; C. Burns 26' | Report | Davids 14'; Hamza 19'; Lardant 20' |

Umpires:
Melina Illanes (ARG)
Abby MacArthur (WAL)

== Medal round ==
=== Bracket ===
Quarter-finals
7 February
Germany | 7
Thailand | 1
7 February
Namibia | 1
Austria | 5
7 February
Czech Republic | 4
United States | 2
7 February
Poland | 2
Belgium | 1

Semi-finals
8 February
Germany | 2 (1)
Austria (p.s.o.) | 2 (3)
8 February
Czech Republic | 1
Poland | 3

Final
9 February
Austria | 0
Poland | 1
Third place
9 February
Germany | 3 (2)
Czech Republic (p.s.o.) | 3 (3)

=== Quarter-finals ===
7 February 2025
17:50

| Namibia | 1–5 | Austria |
|---|---|---|
| Cormack 28' | Report | Proksch 6'; Hahnenkamp 26'; Buchta 27', 32'; Bauer 31' |

Umpires:
Rachel Williams (ENG)
Abby MacArthur (WAL)

7 February 2025
19:00

| Czech Republic | 4–2 | United States |
|---|---|---|
| Duchková 2'; Nováková 7'; Laciná 28'; Babická 30' | Report | D'Ariano 13', 40' |

Umpires:
Emily Carroll (AUS)
Kristy Robertson (AUS)

7 February 2025
20:10

| Poland | 2–1 | Belgium |
|---|---|---|
| Rybacha 19'; Zimmermann 37' | Report | Peeters 3' |

Umpires:
Melina Illanes (ARG)
Ivona Makar (CRO)

7 February 2025
21:20

| Germany | 7–1 | Thailand |
|---|---|---|
| Wanner 7', 24', 40'; Bolle 12', 28', 40'; Kiefer 38' | Report | Sakulpithak 12' |

Umpires:
Ana Ortega (ESP)
Łukasz Zwierzchowski (POL)

=== Fifth to eighth place ===
Crossover
8 February
Thailand | 2
Namibia | 3
8 February
United States | 5
Belgium | 6

Fifth place
9 February
Namibia | 1
Belgium | 6
Seventh place
9 February
Thailand | 3
United States | 5

==== Crossover ====
8 February 2025
13:40

| Thailand | 2–3 | Namibia |
|---|---|---|
| Todkaew 9'; Sakulpithak 40' | Report | Cormack 10', 40'; Kruger 17' |

Umpires:
Emily Carroll (AUS)
Ivona Makar (CRO)

8 February 2025
14:50

| Belgium | 6–5 | United States |
|---|---|---|
| Gose-Claessens 4', 32'; Bierlaire 6'; Peeters 9', 23'; Ronquetti 26' | Report | Matson 3'; D'Ariano 14', 34', 40'; Bruder 37' |

Umpires:
Michelle Meister (GER)
Kristy Robertson (AUS)

==== Seventh and eighth place ====
9 February 2025
10:10

| Thailand | 3–5 | United States |
|---|---|---|
| Todkaew 24', 38'; Sakulpithak 29' | Report | D'Ariano 5', 17', 19'; Matson 18', 38' |

Umpires:
Ana Ortega (ESP)
Ivona Makar (CRO)

==== Fifth and sixth place ====
9 February 2025
11:20

| Namibia | 1–6 | Belgium |
|---|---|---|
| Myburgh 27' | Report | Peeters 5'; Verboven 21', 28'; Ronquetti 24', 37'; Bierlaire 30' |

Umpires:
Kristy Robertson (AUS)
Abby MacArthur (WAL)

=== First to fourth place ===
==== Semi-finals ====
8 February 2025
18:20

| Germany | 2–2 | Austria |
|---|---|---|
| Bolle 8'; Wanner 18' | Report | Felber 26'; Hahnenkamp 37' |
Penalties
| Bolle (penalty shoot-out scored); Kirschbaum (penalty shoot-out missed) | 1–3 | (penalty shoot-out scored) Kern; (penalty shoot-out scored) Felber; (penalty shoot-out scored) Czech |

Umpires:
Emily Carroll (AUS)
Melina Illanes (ARG)

8 February 2025
19:30

| Poland | 3–1 | Czech Republic |
|---|---|---|
| Rybacha 4', 6'; Czujewicz 32' | Report | Babická 36' |

Umpires:
Michelle Meister (GER)
Ana Ortega (ESP)

==== Bronze medal match ====
9 February 2025
14:50

| Germany | 3–3 | Czech Republic |
|---|---|---|
| Weber 3'; Bolle 4', 32' | Report | Lehovcová 8', 18'; Babická 40' |
Penalties
| Bolle (penalty shoot-out scored); Wanner (penalty shoot-out missed); Wanner (penalty shoot-out scored); Bolle (penalty shoot-out missed); Wanner (penalty shoot-out missed); Poppe (penalty shoot-out missed) | 2–3 | (penalty shoot-out scored) Hájková; (penalty shoot-out missed) Nováková; (penalty shoot-out scored) Laciná; (penalty shoot-out missed) Hájková; (penalty shoot-out missed) Laciná; (penalty shoot-out scored) Nováková |

Umpires:
Emily Carroll (AUS)
Ana Ortega (ESP)

==== Gold medal match ====
9 February 2025
18:20

| Austria | 0–1 | Poland |
|---|---|---|
| | Report | Katerla 3' |

Umpires:
Rachel Williams (ENG)
Michael Pontus (BEL)

== Final standings ==
As per statistical convention in field hockey, matches decided in extra time are counted as wins and losses, while matches decided by penalty shoot-outs are counted as draws.

| Pos | Grp | Team | Pld | W | D | L | GF | GA | GD | Pts | Final result |
|---|---|---|---|---|---|---|---|---|---|---|---|
| 1 | B | Poland | 6 | 5 | 1 | 0 | 12 | 5 | +7 | 16 | Gold medal |
| 2 | B | Austria | 6 | 2 | 2 | 2 | 19 | 7 | +12 | 8 | Silver medal |
| 3 | A | Czechia | 6 | 4 | 1 | 1 | 23 | 14 | +9 | 13 | Bronze medal |
| 4 | C | Germany | 6 | 4 | 2 | 0 | 36 | 8 | +28 | 14 | |
| 5 | A | Belgium | 6 | 3 | 1 | 2 | 23 | 16 | +7 | 10 | |
| 6 | C | Namibia | 6 | 3 | 0 | 3 | 16 | 23 | −7 | 9 | |
| 7 | A | United States | 6 | 2 | 1 | 3 | 22 | 22 | 0 | 7 | |
| 8 | B | Thailand | 6 | 1 | 1 | 4 | 12 | 21 | −9 | 4 | |
| 9 | B | South Africa | 5 | 2 | 1 | 2 | 15 | 20 | −5 | 7 | |
| 10 | C | Australia | 5 | 2 | 0 | 3 | 9 | 14 | −5 | 6 | |
| 11 | C | New Zealand | 5 | 1 | 0 | 4 | 5 | 23 | −18 | 3 | |
| 12 | A | Croatia (H) | 5 | 0 | 0 | 5 | 7 | 26 | −19 | 0 | |

Source: FIH
(H) Hosts

== Awards ==
The following awards were given at the conclusion of the tournament.

| Award | Player |
|---|---|
| Player of the tournament | (Poland) Marlena Rybacha |
| Goalkeeper of the tournament | (Thailand) Somlak Suttiprapa |
| Young player of the tournament | (United States) Reese D'Ariano |

== Goalscorers ==
There were 199 goals scored in 34 matches, for an average of 5.85 goals per match.

14 goals

- (Germany) Ines Wanner

12 goals

- (Germany) Philin Bolle

11 goals

- (United States) Reese D'Ariano

8 goals

- (Czech Republic) Adéla Lehovcová
- (United States) Erin Matson

7 goals

- (Belgium) Daphné Gose-Claessens

6 goals

- (Belgium) Joanne Peeters
- (Thailand) Jiratchaya Todkaew

5 goals

- (Croatia) Lucija Čepo
- (Czech Republic) Nikol Babická
- (Namibia) Taramarie Myburgh

4 goals

- (Austria) Katharina Bauer
- (Austria) Daria Buchta
- (Belgium) Marie Ronquetti
- (Namibia) Jivanka Kruger
- (Poland) Marlena Rybacha

3 goals

- (Australia) Brooke Welsh
- (Austria) Laura Kern
- (Austria) Katharina Proksch
- (Czech Republic) Lucie Duchková
- (Germany) Katharina Kiefer
- (Namibia) Kiana-Che Cormack
- (Poland) Monika Chmiel
- (South Africa) Malikah Hamza
- (South Africa) Jessica Lardant
- (South Africa) Kayla de Waal
- (Thailand) Tikhamporn Sakulpithak

2 goals

- (Australia) Caitlin Burns
- (Austria) Fiona Felber
- (Austria) Marie Hahnenkamp
- (Belgium) Romane Bierlaire
- (Belgium) Fleur Verboven
- (Czech Republic) Kateřina Laciná
- (Czech Republic) Natálie Nováková
- (Czech Republic) Anna Vorlová
- (Germany) Teresa Martin-Pelegrina
- (Germany) Maja Weber
- (Namibia) Azaylee Philander
- (New Zealand) Kirsten Pearce
- (New Zealand) Arabella Sheild
- (Poland) Viktoria Zimmermann
- (South Africa) Tegan Fourie
- (South Africa) Cailynn den Bakker
- (Thailand) Kittiya Losantia
- (United States) Charlotte Bruder

1 goal

- (Australia) Kelsey Hughes
- (Australia) Eden Jackat
- (Australia) Annelyse Tevant
- (Australia) Jamie Zimmerman
- (Austria) Johanna Czech
- (Belgium) Laurine Delforge
- (Belgium) Ophélie Vincent
- (Croatia) Lucija Nizek
- (Croatia) Viktoria Šomin
- (Czech Republic) Anna Kolářová
- (Germany) Elisa Gräve
- (Germany) Ida-Marie Köllinger
- (Germany) Fenja Poppe
- (Namibia) Jahntwa Kruger
- (Namibia) Danja Meyer
- (New Zealand) Emily Brun
- (Poland) Julia Balcerzak
- (Poland) Marta Czujewicz
- (Poland) Amelia Katerla
- (South Africa) Laylaa Davids
- (South Africa) Daniella de Oliveira
- (Thailand) Thanaporn Tongkham
- (United States) Annika Herbine

Source: FIH

== See also ==
- 2025 Men's FIH Indoor Hockey World Cup
