= Celia Seerane =

South African field hockey player

Personal information
- Born: Celia Beatrice Evans; 18 June 1990 (age 36)

Sport
- Sport: Field hockey
- Club: Tuks
National team
| Years | Team | Caps | Goals |
| 2012-present | South Africa | 177 | (48) |
| 2014-present | South Africa (indoor) | 66 | (36) |
Medal record
Africa Cup of Nations
| Gold medal – first place | 2013 Nairobi |
| Gold medal – first place | 2017 Ismailia |
| Gold medal – first place | 2022 Accra |
Indoor Africa Cup
| Gold medal – first place | 2024 Swakopmund |
| Silver medal – second place | 2017 Swakopmund |
| Silver medal – second place | 2021 Durban |

Celia Beatrice Seerane OLY (née Evans, born 18 June 1990) is a South African female field hockey player who plays for the South Africa women's national field hockey team.

== Career ==
She made her senior international debut in 2012. She received her debut Women's Hockey World Cup call during the 2014 Women's Hockey World Cup, where South Africa finished at ninth position. She was also part of the national team which emerged as runners-up to England 2–1 in the final of the 2014 Women's Hockey Investec Cup. Celia also featured in the 2015 Women's Indoor Hockey World Cup where South Africa finished at ninth position.

She was also a key member of the South African team which won the 2017 Hockey Africa Cup of Nations for the record seventh time. She narrowly missed out an opportunity to represent the national team at the 2018 Women's Hockey World Cup due to a knee injury.

She has also competed at the Commonwealth Games with the national team in 2014 and 2018. In 2017, she was awarded for the country's best women's hockey player for the year 2016 during the SA Hockey Awards.
