= Kelly Madsen =

South African field hockey player

Sport
- Sport: Field hockey
National team
Years	Team	Caps	Goals
2010-2015	South Africa	130	(3)
2014-present	Indoor South Africa	45	(31)
Medal record
Representing South Africa
Women's Field hockey
Africa Cup of Nations
Gold medal – first place	2013 Nairobi
Women's Indoor hockey
Indoor Africa Cup
Silver medal – second place	2017 Swakopmund
Silver medal – second place	2021 Durban
- Updated on 11 January 2022

Kelly Madsen is a South African field hockey player who plays for the South Africa women's national field hockey team.

She made her senior international debut in 2009 after being part of the 2009 Women's Hockey Junior World Cup. She featured in 2 Women's Hockey World Cup tournaments in 2010 and in 2014. She also competed at the Commonwealth Games with the national team in 2010.
