= 2022 World Cup (disambiguation) =

2022 World Cup most commonly refers to the 2022 FIFA World Cup; the 22nd edition of the FIFA World Cup.

2022 World Cup may also refer to:

== Association football ==
- 2021 FIFA Club World Cup (held in early 2022)
- 2022 FIFA Club World Cup (held in early 2023)
- 2022 FIFA U-20 Women's World Cup
- 2022 FIFA U-17 Women's World Cup

== Baseball ==
- 2022 U-23 Baseball World Cup

== Basketball ==
- 2022 FIBA Under-17 Basketball World Cup
- 2022 FIBA Under-17 Women's Basketball World Cup
- 2022 FIBA Women's Basketball World Cup

== Cricket ==
- 2022 ICC Men's T20 World Cup
- 2022 Women's Cricket World Cup

== Field hockey ==
- 2022 Women's FIH Hockey Junior World Cup
- 2022 Women's FIH Hockey World Cup

== Indoor hockey ==
- 2022 Men's FIH Indoor Hockey World Cup
- 2022 Women's FIH Indoor Hockey World Cup

== Rugby league ==
- 2021 Men's Rugby League World Cup
- 2021 Women's Rugby League World Cup
- 2021 Wheelchair Rugby League World Cup
- 2021 Physical Disability Rugby League World Cup

== Rugby union ==
- 2021 Rugby World Cup

== Shooting ==
- 2022 ISSF World Cup

== Winter sports ==
- 2021–22 Biathlon World Cup
- 2021–22 FIS Alpine Ski World Cup
- 2021–22 FIS Cross-Country World Cup
