= Anneke Böhmert =

German field hockey player

Personal information
- Full name: Anneke Franziska Böhmert
- Born: 18 February 1981 (age 45) Hamburg, Germany
- Height: 170 cm (5 ft 7 in)

Sport
- Sport: Field hockey
- Position: Midfield
National team
Years	Team	Caps	Goals
1998–2001	Germany U–21	17	(7)
2000–2010	Germany Indoor	36	(81)
2002–2010	Germany	78	(19)
Medal record
Women's field hockey
Representing Germany
EuroHockey Championships
Bronze medal – third place	2003 Barcelona	Team
FIH Champions Trophy
Silver medal – second place	2008 Mönchengladbach	Team
FIH Champions Challenge
Gold medal – first place	2003 Catania	Team
Women's indoor hockey
Representing Germany
World Cup
Gold medal – first place	2003 Leipzig	Team
EuroHockey Indoor Championships
Gold medal – first place	2000 Vienna	Team
Gold medal – first place	2002 Les Ponts-de-Cé	Team
Gold medal – first place	2006 Eindhoven	Team
Gold medal – first place	2008 Almería	Team
Bronze medal – third place	2010 Duisburg	Team

Anneke Franziska Böhmert (born 18 February 1981) is a former field and indoor hockey player from Germany, who played as a midfielder.

== Personal life ==
Anneke Böhmert was born and raised in Hamburg, Germany.

She works as a teacher at the Stadtteilschule Horn school.

== Career ==
=== Club hockey ===
During her career, Böhmert represented der Club an der Alster in the Women's Bundesliga.

=== International hockey ===
==== Indoor ====
Böhmert made her debut for the Germany Indoor team in 2000, at the EuroHockey Indoor Championships in Vienna, where the team won gold.

In 2003, she was a member of the gold winning team at the Indoor World Cup in Leipzig.

==== Under–21 ====
Anneke Böhmert was a member of the German U–21 from 1998 to 2001. During her period in the junior team, she won gold at the 1998 EuroHockey Junior Championships in Belfast and competed at the 2001 FIH Junior World Cup in Buenos Aires.

==== Die Danas ====
Following appearances with the Under–21 and Indoor teams, Böhmert made her debut for the senior national team in 2002.

Böhmert won her first medal at a major tournament in 2003, at the FIH Champions Challenge in Catania, taking home gold. She then went on to win bronze later that year at the EuroHockey Championships in Barcelona.

It wasn't until 2008 when Böhmert medalled again with the national team, winning silver at the FIH Champions Trophy in Mönchengladbach.
