= 2023 FIH Indoor Hockey World Cup =

2023 FIH Indoor Hockey World Cup may refer to:

- 2023 Men's FIH Indoor Hockey World Cup
- 2023 Women's FIH Indoor Hockey World Cup
