= Kara-Lee Botes =

South African field hockey player

Personal information
- Born: Kara-Lee Stella; 7 March 1990 (age 36)
- Height: 1.68 m (5 ft 6 in)
- Weight: 62 kg (137 lb)

Sport
- Sport: Field hockey
National team
Years	Team	Caps	Goals
2016-2020	South Africa	53	(2)
2016-2020	South Africa indoor	76	(85)
Medal record
Africa Cup of Nations
Gold medal – first place	2017 Ismailia
Indoor Africa Cup
Silver medal – second place	2017 Swakopmund

Kara-Lee Botes (née Stella, born 7 March 1990) is a South African field hockey player for the South African national team.

She participated at the 2018 Women's Hockey World Cup.
