= Anna Kolářová =

Anna Kolářová may refer to:

- Anna Kolářová (swimmer)
- Anna Kolářová (field hockey)
