= Mabel Brands =

Dutch field hockey player (born 1998)

Personal information
- Born: 16 October 1998 (age 27) Enschede, Netherlands

Sport
- Sport: Field hockey
- Position: Defence
Senior career
Years	Team	Caps	Goals
2017–2023	Kampong	-	-
2023–2026	Düsseldorfer	-	-
2026–	Canberra Chill	-	-
National team
Years	Team	Caps	Goals
2022–	Netherlands Indoor	14	(8)
Medal record
Women's indoor hockey
Representing Netherlands
FIH Indoor World Cup
Gold medal – first place	2023 Pretoria
EuroHockey Indoor Championship
Silver medal – second place	2022 Hamburg

Mabel Brands (born 16 October 1998) is a field and indoor hockey player from the Netherlands.

== Indoor hockey ==
=== National team ===
Since 2022, Brands has been a member of the Netherlands national indoor team. She was a member of the silver medal winning squad at the 2022 EuroHockey Indoor Championship in Hamburg.

She last represented the team at the 2023 FIH Indoor World Cup in Pretoria where she won a gold medal.

=== Domestic ===
In addition to representing the Dutch national team, she has represented teams in European domestic competitions.

== Field hockey ==
=== Domestic ===
While she hasn't represented the Netherlands national field hockey team, Brands has competed in top level domestic competitions in multiple countries. She has represented Kampong in the Dutch Hoofdklasse, Düsseldorfer in the German Bundesliga, and will travel to Australia to represent the Canberra Chill in the ONE Active Hockey One League.
