= Indoor Hockey World Cup =

Indoor Hockey World Cup may refer to:

- Men's Indoor Hockey World Cup
- Women's Indoor Hockey World Cup
