= 2021 Indoor Hockey World Cup =

2021 Indoor Hockey World Cup may refer to:

- 2021 Men's Indoor Hockey World Cup
- 2021 Women's Indoor Hockey World Cup
