= Holly Evans =

Australian field hockey player

Personal information
- Born: 20 February 1987 (age 39) Adelaide, South Australia
- Height: 155 cm (5 ft 1 in)

Sport
- Sport: Field hockey
- Position: Midfielder
Senior career
| Years | Team | Caps | Goals |
| 2004–2018 | SA Suns | 119 | 10 |
| 2019– | Adelaide Fire | 7 | 0 |
National team
| Years | Team | Caps | Goals |
| 2010–2012 | Australia | 15 | (1) |
| 2007–2015 | Australia Indoor | 24 | (12) |
Medal record
Women's field hockey
Representing Australia
Oceania Cup
| Silver medal – second place | 2011 Hobart | Team |

Holly Evans (born 20 February 1987) is a former field and indoor hockey player from Australia.

== Personal life ==
Holly Evans was born and raised in Adelaide, South Australia.

Introduced to hockey by family at a young age, Evans' father Roy coached hockey for South Australia at a national level, whilst her older brother Dylan has also played representative hockey for the SA Hotshots.

Evans currently resides in her home city of Adelaide, where she works as an Exercise Physiologist.

== Career ==
=== Domestic hockey ===
==== Club level ====
Evans started playing hockey at age 7 for Burnside HC. She transferred clubs to North East HC (NEHC) whilst still a junior player. At just age 12, she made her debut for the NEHC Division 1 women's team in Hockey SA's Premier League competition. Evans is a life member of NEHC, which she continues to represent as a player-coach in the Premier League division.

==== National leagues ====
Evans made her debut into the Australian Hockey League (AHL), Hockey Australia's former premier domestic competition, in 2004. She was a member of her home state's representative team, the SA Suns. During her ten-year AHL career, Evans won one national title with the side, at the 2011 edition of the tournament.

In 2019, following the overhaul of the AHL and subsequent introduction of the Sultana Bran Hockey One League, Evans was named in the preliminary Adelaide Fire squad for season one of the new league. She went on to represent the Adelaide Fire in every match of the league, with the team finishing in third place.

=== International hockey ===
==== Hockeyroos ====
Known for her speed and swift stick skills, Evans made her international debut for Australia in early 2010 during a test-series against New Zealand in Perth.

Evans secured a place in the 2011 national squad, working towards a potential Olympic appearance in 2012. She made her first appearance at a major tournament during the Oceania Cup in Hobart, where she won a silver medal.

==== Indoor ====
In addition to field hockey, Evans also made an impact on the hard court, being selected in the Australian Indoor Squad from 2007 to 2016 and impressively competing at two FIH Indoor World Cups.

Evans competed at the 2011 and 2015 FIH Indoor World Cups, finishing in eighth position on both occasions.

== Recognition & Awards ==
- Hockey SA Premier League Women's Best & Fairest – (2009 and 2016)
