= 2022 Indoor Hockey World Cup =

2022 Indoor Hockey World Cup may refer to:

- 2022 Men's FIH Indoor Hockey World Cup
- 2022 Women's FIH Indoor Hockey World Cup
