= Philin Bolle =

German field hockey player

Personal information
- Born: 17 April 1999 (age 27) Munich, Germany

Sport
- Sport: Field hockey
- Position: Midfield
- Club: Münchner SC
National team
Years	Team	Caps	Goals
2017–2019	Germany U–21	7	(0)
2021–	Germany	2	(0)
2024–	Germany Indoor	12	(19)
Medal record
Women's field hockey
Representing Germany
EuroHockey U21 Championship
Bronze medal – third place	2019 Valencia
Women's indoor hockey
EuroHockey Indoor Championship
Gold medal – first place	2024 Berlin

Philin Bolle (born 17 April 1999) is a field and indoor hockey player from Germany.

== Personal life ==
Philin Bolle was born in Munich, Germany.

== Field hockey ==
=== Domestic league ===
Throughout her junior and senior career, Bolle has been a playing member of Münchner SC.

=== Under–21 ===
Throughout 2019, Bolle was a member of the national junior team. She represented the side at the EuroHockey U21 Championship in Valencia. At the tournament, Bolle won her first and only medal with the junior squad, taking home bronze after defeating Belgium in penalties.

=== Die Danas ===
Bolle made her senior international debut in 2021. She earned her first cap during season three of the FIH Pro League, in a match against Belgium in Antwerp.

Following her debut, Bolle was not included in the Die Danas squad for over four years. She returned to the national setup in 2026, where she was named in the travelling squad for matches of the FIH Pro League's seventh season in Valencia.

== Indoor hockey ==
In addition to field hockey, Bolle also plays international indoor hockey for Germany. She won gold at the 2024 EuroHockey Indoor Championship in Berlin.

Major Tournaments

- 2024 EuroHockey Indoor Championship – Berlin
- 2025 FIH Indoor World Cup – Poreč
