= Anna Kolářová (field hockey) =

Czech field hockey player

Personal information
- Born: 8 October 1998 (age 27) Czech Republic

Sport
- Sport: Field hockey
- Position: Forward
Senior career
Years	Team	Caps	Goals
–	Slavia Praha	-	-
National team
Years	Team	Caps	Goals
2014–	Czech Republic	75	(13)
2015–	Czech Republic Indoor	39	(13)
Medal record
Women's field hockey
Representing Czech Republic
EuroHockey Championship II
Silver medal – second place	2015 Prague
Women's indoor hockey
FIH Indoor World Cup
Bronze medal – third place	2015 Leipzig
Bronze medal – third place	2023 Pretoria
Bronze medal – third place	2025 Poreč
EuroHockey Indoor Championship
Bronze medal – third place	2020 Minsk

Anna Kolářová (born 8 October 1998) is a Czech indoor and field hockey player.

== Life ==
Kolářová was born on 8 October 1998.

== Career ==
=== Domestic league ===
In the Czech National League, Kolářová represents HC Slavia Praha.

=== Indoor hockey ===
Kolářová made her international indoor hockey debut in 2015 at the FIH Indoor World Cup in Leipzig.

Since her debut, she has represented the national team at every EuroHockey Indoor Championship and FIH Indoor World Cup held. During this time she has earned bronze medals at the 2023 edition of the FIH Indoor World Cup, as well as the 2020 edition of the EuroHockey Indoor Championship.

=== Field hockey ===
Kolářová made her senior international debut in 2014 during round one of the 2012–13 FIH World League.

Throughout her career, Kolářová has been present at numerous international events. She has medalled once with the national team, taking home silver at the 2015 edition of the EuroHockey Championship II.

She has been named in the squad for the 2024 FIH Olympic Qualifiers in Ranchi.
