= 2011 Women's Indoor Hockey World Cup =

International indoor hockey tournament

Tournament details
- Host country: Poland
- City: Poznań
- Teams: 12
- Venue: 1

Final positions
- Champions: Germany (2nd title)
- Runner-up: Netherlands
- Third place: Ukraine

Tournament statistics
- Matches played: 38
- Goals scored: 213 (5.61 per match)
- Top scorer: (Netherlands) Belle van Meer (11 goals)
- Best player: (Netherlands) Belle van Meer

The 2011 Women's Indoor Hockey World Cup was the third edition of this tournament. It was played at 8–13 February 2011 in Poznań, Poland. For the first time in history, teams from all five continents were represented.

Netherlands was the defending champion.

== Participating teams ==
- Argentina
- Australia
- Austria
- Belarus
- Czech Republic
- Germany
- Kazakhstan
- Namibia
- Netherlands
- Poland
- Ukraine
- Uruguay

== Venue ==
All matches were played at the Poznań International Fair Exhibition Hall.

== Pools ==
Pool A	Pool B
Netherlands; Ukraine; Czech Republic; Austria; Argentina; Kazakhstan	Germany; Belarus; Australia; Poland; Namibia; Uruguay

== Results ==
=== Preliminary round ===
==== Pool A ====
Pos	Team	Pld	W	D	L	GF	GA	GD	Pts	Qualification
1	Netherlands	5	5	0	0	32	3	+29	15	Advanced to Semi-finals
2	Ukraine	5	4	0	1	14	7	+7	12	Advanced to Semi-finals
3	Czech Republic	5	3	0	2	12	16	−4	9	
4	Austria	5	2	0	3	10	11	−1	6	
5	Argentina	5	1	0	4	9	19	−10	3	
6	Kazakhstan	5	0	0	5	4	25	−21	0	

Source: FIH
Rules for classification: 1) points; 2) matches won; 3) goal difference; 4) goals for; 5) head-to-head result; 6) field goals scored.

8 February 2011
12:30

Czech Republic	1–0	Austria
Poloprutská 40'	Report

Umpires:
Irene Clelland (AUS)
Tatyana Kaltypan (UKR)

8 February 2011
13:45

Netherlands	9–0	Kazakhstan
Collot 6', 33'; Van Meer 11', 20', 25'; Hulsen 16'; Den Ouden 31', 39'; Voskamp 35'	Report

Umpires:
Jean Duncan (SCO)
Ana Faias (POR)

8 February 2011
15:00

Ukraine	2–1	Argentina
Vynohradova 6', 40'	Report	González 37'

Umpires:
Lisa Roach (AUS)
Meister (GER)

9 February 2011
10:00

Kazakhstan	2–4	Czech Republic
Gataulina 3'; Domashneva 39'	Report	Brtvová 8', 17', 22'; Haklová 26'

Umpires:
Caroline Brunekreef (NED)
Teruel del Olmo (ESP)

9 February 2011
11:15

Ukraine	2–1	Austria
Vynohradova 8', 32'	Report	Zerbs 23'

Umpires:
Frances Block (ENG)
Elena Eskina (RUS)

9 February 2011
12:30

Netherlands	8–2	Argentina
Dijkstra 1', 7', 11', 14'; Van Meer 11', 26'; Van Dijk 27'; De Blaey 34'	Report	Gomes 7', 39'

Umpires:
Irene Clelland (AUS)
Tatiana Chojnacka (POL)

9 February 2011
16:15

Kazakhstan	1–4	Ukraine
Gataulina 1'	Report	Vynohradova 3', 8'; Hylyneko 15', 24'

Umpires:
Wendy Stewart (CAN)
Teruel del Olmo (ESP)

9 February 2011
17:30

Austria	4–0	Argentina
Balek 4'; Vukovich 10'; Mayer 38'; Specjal 40'	Report

Umpires:
Caroline Brunekreef (NED)
Tatyana Kaltypan (UKR)

9 February 2011
20:00

Czech Republic	1–5	Netherlands
Brtvová 1'	Report	Dijkstra 11'; Collot 31', 40'; Plijter 35'; Van Meer 39'

Umpires:
Frances Block (ENG)
Jean Duncan (SCO)

10 February 2011
10:00

Austria	5–1	Kazakhstan
	Report

10 February 2011
13:45

Ukraine	0–3	Netherlands
	Report

10 February 2011
16:15

Argentina	3–5	Czech Republic
	Report

11 February 2011
13:45

Czech Republic	1–6	Ukraine
	Report

11 February 2011
15:00

Argentina	3–0	Kazakhstan
	Report

11 February 2011
16:15

Netherlands	7–0	Austria
	Report

==== Pool B ====
Team	Pld	W	D	L	GF	GA	GD	Pts
Germany	5	5	0	0	31	2	+29	15
Belarus	5	3	1	1	21	8	+13	10
Poland	5	3	0	2	15	9	+6	9
Australia	5	2	1	2	16	14	+2	7
Namibia	5	1	0	4	2	43	−41	3
Uruguay	5	0	0	5	4	13	−9	0

8 February 2011
16:15

Germany	2–0	Uruguay
Sager 6'; Keller 11'	Report

Umpires:
Caroline Brunekreef (NED)
Tatiana Chojnacka (POL)

8 February 2011
17:30

Australia	1–2	Poland
Evans 27'	Report	Wisniewska 16'; Bugala 21'

Umpires:
Frances Block (ENG)
Wendy Stewart (CAN)

8 February 2011
17:30

Belarus	12–0	Namibia

9 February 2011
13:45

Germany	17–1	Namibia
Keller 1', 14', 30', 33'; Hahn 2', 4'; Rinne 6', 23', 39', 40'; Landshut 13', 15', 34'; Grote 16'; Holm 16', 20'; Sager 35'	Report	Mengo 4'

Umpires:
Lisa Roach (AUS)
Ana Faias (POR)

9 February 2011
13:45

Uruguay	2–5	Australia
Nieto 18'; Matalonga 39'	Report	Eastwood 1'; Evans 17'; Young 20'; Boucher 27', 34'

Umpires:
Jean Duncan (SCO)
Michelle Meister (GER)

9 February 2011
18:45

Belarus	4–2	Poland
Mikheichyk 4'; Kulinkovich 21'; Kurhanskaya 25', 38'	Report	Rybacha 7'; Wisniewska 17'

Umpires:
Irene Clelland (AUS)
Lisa Roach (AUS)

10 February 2011
10:00

Australia	1–7	Germany
Eastwood 31'	Report	Rinne 2', 20', 27'; Hahn 4', 9', 38'; Holm 35'

Umpires:
Jean Duncan (SCO)
Tatyana Kaltypan (UKR)

10 February 2011
11:15

Uruguay	1–2	Belarus

10 February 2011
12:30

Poland	8–0	Namibia

10 February 2011
17:30

Belarus	0–2	Germany
	Report	Rinne 20'; Hahn 22'

Umpires:
Frances Block (ENG)
Wendy Stewart (CAN)

10 February 2011
18:45

Poland	3–1	Uruguay

10 February 2011
20:00

Namibia	0–6	Australia
	Report	Boucher 2', 11', 25'; Watson 16'; Evans 31'; Cobbin 37'

Umpires:
Ana Faias (POR)
Tatyana Kaltypan (UKR)

11 February 2011
15:00

Namibia	1–0	Uruguay
van der Linde 25'	Report

Umpires:
Irene Clelland (SCO)
Tatiana Chojnacka (POL)

11 February 2011
18:45

Germany	3–0	Poland
Keller 2'; Holm 6'; Sager 28'	Report

Umpires:
Elena Eskina (RUS)
Tatyana Kaltypan (UKR)

11 February 2011
20:00

Australia	3–3	Belarus
Young 2'; Watson 13'; Eastwood 38'	Report	Shyntar 4', 39', 40'

Umpires:
Caroline Brunekreef (NED)
Michelle Meister (GER)

=== Classification round ===
==== Fifth to twelfth place classification ====
===== Eleventh and twelfth place =====
12 February 2011
11:00

Kazakhstan	1–3	Uruguay
Sazontova 7'	Report	Olave 20', 22'; Olaso 35'

Umpires:
Tatyana Kaltypan (UKR)
Ana Faias (POR)

===== Ninth and tenth place =====
12 February 2011
14:00

Argentina	4–1	Namibia
González 16'; Paz 20'; Ríos 21'; Yanzi 40'	Report	Cormack 8'

Umpires:
Tatiana Chojnacka (POL)
Victoria Del Olmo (ESP)

===== Seventh and eighth place =====
12 February 2011
11:30

Austria	2–1 (a.e.t.)	Australia
Anderlik 22'; Zerbs 45'	Report	Evans 30'

Umpires:
Jean Duncan (SCO)
Elena Eskina (RUS)

===== Fifth and sixth place =====
12 February 2011
13:00

Czech Republic	0–4	Poland

==== First to fourth place classification ====
Semi-finals
12 February
Netherlands	7
Belarus	0
12 February
Germany	6
Ukraine	2

Final
13 February
Netherlands	2
Germany	4
Third place
13 February
Belarus	2
Ukraine	4

===== Semi-finals =====
12 February 2011
16:00

Netherlands	7–0	Belarus

12 February 2011
19:00

Germany	6–2	Ukraine

===== Bronze-medal match =====
13 February 2011
10:30

Belarus	2–4	Ukraine

===== Gold-medal match =====
13 February 2011
13:30

Netherlands	2–4	Germany
Collot D'Escury 3', 34'	Report	Grote 8'; Frenz 14'; Rinne 22', 24'

Umpires:
Frances Block (ENG)
Lisa Roach (AUS)

== Statistics ==
=== Awards ===
Top Goalscorer	Player of the Tournament	Goalkeeper of the Tournament	Best Under 21 Player
(Netherlands) Belle van Meer	(Netherlands) Belle van Meer	(Germany) Barbara Vogel	(Poland) Paulina Okaj

=== Final ranking ===
Rank	Team
Gold medal	Germany
Silver medal	Netherlands
Bronze medal	Ukraine
4	Belarus
5	Poland
6	Czech Republic
7	Austria
8	Australia
9	Argentina
10	Namibia
11	Uruguay
12	Kazakhstan

=== Goalscorers ===
There were 213 goals scored in 38 matches, for an average of 5.61 goals per match.

11 goals

- (Netherlands) Belle van Meer

10 goals

- (Germany) Fanny Rinne

8 goals

- (Netherlands) Marieke Dijkstra

7 goals

- (Germany) Lisa Hahn
- (Germany) Natascha Keller
- (Netherlands) Kiki Collot D’Escury
- (Ukraine) Maryna Vynohradova

6 goals

- (Germany) Rike Sager
- (Poland) Natalia Wisniewska

5 goals

- (Argentina) Agustina Gonzalez Minguez
- (Australia) Tegan Boucher
- (Belarus) Yuliya Kurhanskaya
- (Belarus) Yuliya Mikheichyk
- (Belarus) Volha Shyntar
- (Netherlands) Karin den Ouden
- (Netherlands) Jolanda Plijter
- (Ukraine) Yana Vorushylo

4 goals

- (Australia) Holly Evans
- (Czech Republic) Lenka Brtvova
- (Czech Republic) Barbora Haklova
- (Germany) Kerstin Holm
- (Poland) Paulina Okaj

3 goals

- (Argentina) Julia Gomes
- (Australia) Melissa Eastwood
- (Austria) Corinna Zerbs
- (Belarus) Krestsina Kulinkovich
- (Germany) Dinah Grote
- (Germany) Rebecca Landshut
- (Poland) Aleksandra Bugala
- (Poland) Joanna Wieloch
- (Ukraine) Halyna Hylyneko
- (Ukraine) Bohdana Sadova

2 goals

- (Argentina) Juliana Rios Ferreyra
- (Argentina) Emma Yanzi
- (Australia) Shelley Watson
- (Australia) Fiona Young
- (Austria) Irene Balek
- (Austria) Monika Specjal
- (Austria) Kristine Vukovich
- (Belarus) Alesia Piotkh
- (Kazakhstan) Natalya Gataulina
- (Kazakhstan) Natalya Sazontova
- (Netherlands) Lieke Hulsen
- (Poland) Katarzyna Krasinska
- (Ukraine) Maryna Khilko
- (Uruguay) Carolina Matalonga
- (Uruguay) Anastasia Olave

1 goal

- (Argentina) Maria Paz
- (Australia) Emma Cobbin
- (Austria) Marie-Christine Anderlik
- (Austria) Sandra Klausbruckner
- (Austria) Katharina Mayer
- (Belarus) Ryta Batura
- (Belarus) Maryia Korzh-tsepun
- (Belarus) Yulia Laptsevich
- (Czech Republic) Květoslava Kucerova
- (Czech Republic) Adela Mejzlikova
- (Czech Republic) Klára Poloprutská
- (Czech Republic) Eva Stankova
- (Germany) Stefanie Frenz
- (Kazakhstan) Vera Domashneva
- (Namibia) Shayne Cormack
- (Namibia) Charlize van der LINDE
- (Namibia) Magreth Mengo
- (Netherlands) Merel de Blaey
- (Netherlands) Marianne van Dijk
- (Netherlands) Leonoor Voskamp
- (Poland) Marlena Rybacha
- (Uruguay) Agustina Nieto
- (Uruguay) Isabel Olaso
- (Uruguay) Janine Stanley

Source: FIH

== See also ==
- 2011 Men's Indoor Hockey World Cup
