= Ines Wanner =

German field hockey player

Personal information
- Born: 9 February 2000 (age 26) Ingersheim, Germany

Sport
- Sport: Field hockey
- Position: Midfield
- Club: Mannheimer
National team
Years	Team	Caps	Goals
2024–	Germany Indoor	12	(20)
2025–	Germany	15	(2)
Medal record
Women's field hockey
Representing Germany
EuroHockey Championship
Silver medal – second place	2025 Mönchengladbach
Women's indoor hockey
EuroHockey Indoor Championship
Gold medal – first place	2024 Berlin

Ines Wanner (born 9 February 2000) is a field and indoor hockey player from Germany.

== Personal life ==
Ines Wanner grew up in Ingersheim, a municipality in Baden-Württemberg.

== Indoor hockey ==
In 2024, Wanner made her international debut for the German Indoor team. She was a member of the squad at the EuroHockey Indoor Championship in Berlin. At the tournament she helped the team to a gold medal, scoring six times throughout the competition.

At the 2025 FIH Indoor World Cup in Poreč, Wanner was a member of the German squad that finished fourth. She was also the tournament's highest goalscorer, with 14 goals.

== Field hockey ==
=== Domestic league ===
Wanner currently competes in the German Bundesliga for Mannheimer.

=== Die Danas ===
Following her indoor hockey debut in 2024, Wanner was called into the national field hockey team in 2025. She made her senior international debut for Die Danas during the sixth season of the FIH Pro League. She earned her first cap during a match against Belgium in Antwerp.

Wanner won her first medal with the team in 2025. She was a member of the silver medal-winning squad at the EuroHockey Championship in Mönchengladbach.

== International goals ==
The following table lists all goals scored by Wanner at international level in field hockey.

Goal	Date	Location	Opponent	Score	Result	Event	Ref
1	22 June 2025	Ernst-Reuter Sportfeld, Berlin, Germany	Australia	2–0	3–4	2024–25 FIH Pro League	
2	15 August 2025	SparkassenPark, Mönchengladbach, Germany	Belgium	1–0	1–1 (3–2)	2025 EuroHockey Championship	
