= 2003 Women's Indoor Hockey World Cup =

International indoor hockey tournament

Tournament details
- Host country: Germany
- City: Leipzig
- Dates: 5–9 February 2003
- Teams: 12 (from 4 confederations)

Final positions
- Champions: Germany (1st title)
- Runner-up: Netherlands
- Third place: France

Tournament statistics
- Matches played: 38
- Goals scored: 321 (8.45 per match)
- Top scorer: (Germany) Natascha Keller (24 goals)

The 2003 Women's Indoor Hockey World Cup was the inaugural edition of the women's indoor hockey tournament. The event was held from 5–9 February in Leipzig, Germany.

Germany won the title for the first time after defeating the Netherlands 5–2 in the final. France finished in third place, defeating the Czech Republic 3–1 in the third place playoff.

== Teams ==
The following teams competed in the tournament:

- Australia
- Austria
- Belarus
- Czech Republic
- France
- Germany (host nation)
- Lithuania
- Mexico
- Netherlands
- Russia
- South Africa
- Trinidad and Tobago

== Officials ==
The following umpires were appointed by the FIH to officiate the tournament:

- Lynette Hill (AUS)
- Dawn Henning (ENG)
- Louise Knipe (ENG)
- Ute Conen (GER)
- Heike Malina (GER)
- Mirjam Wessel-Verwer (NED)
- Irina Sivtsova (RUS)
- Jean Duncan (SCO)
- Anne McRae (SCO)
- Ludmila Pastorova (SVK)
- Monica Rivera (ESP)

== Results ==
All times are local (UTC+01:00).

=== Preliminary round ===
==== Pool A ====
Pos	Team	Pld	W	D	L	GF	GA	GD	Pts	Qualification
1	Germany	5	5	0	0	72	9	+63	15	Semi-finals
2	Czech Republic	5	3	0	2	12	18	−6	9	Semi-finals
3	Belarus	5	2	1	2	25	26	−1	7	
4	Austria	5	2	1	2	15	17	−2	7	
5	Australia	5	1	2	2	17	31	−14	5	
6	Trinidad and Tobago	5	0	0	5	8	48	−40	0	

Source: FIH
Rules for classification: 1) points; 2) goal difference; 3) goals scored; 4) head-to-head result.

5 February 2003
12:15

Germany	8–2	Austria
Keller 3', 27'; Ernsting-Krienke 11'; Becker 13'; Rinne 20', 30'; Gude 28', 40'	Report	Balek 8'; Jelinek 29'

Umpires:
Lynette Hill (AUS)
Irina Sivtsova (RUS)

5 February 2003
13:30

Australia	7–3	Trinidad and Tobago
Cumpston 3'; Kolsky 5', 23', 27', 32', 35'; Seaman 37'	Report	Trotman 7'; Siu Butt 21', 31'

Umpires:
Monica Rivera (ESP)
Mirjam Wessel-Verwer (NED)

5 February 2003
14:35

Belarus	2–5	Czech Republic
Laptsevich 5'; Pekshtiarova 36'	Report	Brítová 14'; Míkesová 22'; Poloprutská 28', 30'; Springerová 37'

Umpires:
Ute Conen (GER)
Anne McRae (SCO)

5 February 2003
19:00

Germany	14–3	Belarus
Keller 2', 20', 27', 32'; Böhmert 9', 38'; Ernsting-Krienke 12', 22', 26'; Rinne 18', 31'; Gude 20'; Cremer 25'; Becker 30'	Report	Shyntar 24'; Shliazhas 28'; Laptsevich 29'

Umpires:
Louise Knipe (ENG)
Monica Rivera (ESP)

6 February 2003
08:30

Czech Republic	3–2	Australia
Brítová 5'; Springerová 13', 25'	Report	Kolsky 3'; Swain 33'

Umpires:
Heike Malina (GER)
Irina Sivtsova (RUS)

6 February 2003
09:35

Trinidad and Tobago	2–7	Austria
Trotman 9'; Cabralis 20'	Report	Schwarzmüller 4'; Balek 7', 19', 29'; Gebhardt 17', 30'; Jelinek 39'

Umpires:
Jean Duncan (SCO)
Mirjam Wessel-Verwer (NED)

6 February 2003
14:05

Austria	2–4	Belarus
Gebhardt 3'; M. Anderlik 40'	Report	Pekshtiarova 17', 39'; Shyntar 37'; Laptsevich 40'

Umpires:
Heike Malina (GER)
Dawn Henning (ENG)

6 February 2003
15:10

Czech Republic	3–0	Trinidad and Tobago
Kozaková 8'; Stanková 35'; Springerová 37'	Report

Umpires:
Louise Knipe (ENG)
Ludmila Pastorova (SVK)

6 February 2003
18:30

Australia	2–19	Germany
Simpson 5'; Kolsky 23'	Report	Keller 1', 3', 11', 40'; Rinne 4', 22', 40'; Gude 6', 13'; Becker 8', 28', 32'; Ernsting-Krienke 10', 11', 18'; Böhmert 26', 34', 35'; Hiepen 40'

Umpires:
Dawn Henning (ENG)
Anne McRae (SCO)

7 February 2003
10:35

Trinidad and Tobago	2–19	Germany
Dixon 36'; Trotman 36'	Report	Rinne 1', 16', 31'; Keller 3', 4', 5', 17', 31', 35', 35', 39'; Cremer 7'; Böhmert 10', 21', 22'; Klecker 22'; Becker 25'; Gude 30', 31'

Umpires:
Lynette Hill (AUS)
Irina Sivtsova (RUS)

7 February 2003
11:40

Belarus	4–4	Australia
Pekshtiarova 15'; Shliazhas 25'; Piotkh 28'; Halavinova 40'	Report	Seaman 21'; Kolsky 36', 37', 38'

Umpires:
Monica Rivera (ESP)
Anne McRae (SCO)

7 February 2003
12:45

Austria	2–1	Czech Republic
Balek 33', 40'	Report	Stanková 4'

Umpires:
Ute Conen (GER)
Dawn Henning (ENG)

7 February 2003
17:15

Australia	2–2	Austria
Yorke 15'; Seaman 40'	Report	Balek 38'; M. Anderlik 39'

Umpires:
Louise Knipe (ENG)
Irina Sivtsova (RUS)

7 February 2003
18:30

Germany	12–0	Czech Republic
Keller 5', 20', 30'; Gude 7'; Cremer 12', 37'; Böhmert 15', 21', 30'; Rinne 18', 38'; Ernsting-Krienke 22'	Report

Umpires:
Jean Duncan (SCO)
Anne McRae (SCO)

7 February 2003
20:00

Belarus	12–1	Trinidad and Tobago
Sukhanova 3'; Shliazhas 4', 30', 33'; Laptsevich 5', 24', 31'; Shyntar 14', 20', 34'; Pekshtiarova 37', 39'	Report	Luces 23'

Umpires:
Ludmila Pastorova (SVK)
Mirjam Wessel-Verwer (NED)

==== Pool B ====
Pos	Team	Pld	W	D	L	GF	GA	GD	Pts	Qualification
1	Netherlands	5	5	0	0	37	6	+31	15	Semi-finals
2	France	5	4	0	1	22	9	+13	12	Semi-finals
3	Lithuania	5	3	0	2	23	10	+13	9	
4	Russia	5	2	0	3	17	15	+2	6	
5	South Africa	5	1	0	4	12	28	−16	3	
6	Mexico	5	0	0	5	3	46	−43	0	

Source: FIH
Rules for classification: 1) points; 2) goal difference; 3) goals scored; 4) head-to-head result.

5 February 2003
09:00

Netherlands	5–1	Russia
Goderie 4', 36'; Van Geenhuizen 11'; Schopman 16'; Moreira de Melo 34'	Report	Grigoryeva 9'

Umpires:
Ute Conen (GER)
Louise Knipe (ENG)

5 February 2003
10:05

Lithuania	5–0	South Africa
I. Matjusaitytė 2'; Caikauskienė 7', 38'; Gatelytė 9'; Povilaitytė 30'	Report

Umpires:
Heike Malina (GER)
Anne McRae (GBR)

5 February 2003
11:10

France	9–1	Mexico
Lazennec 8'; Morin 9', 29'; Lafaury 10', 26'; Orefice 18'; Bergere 18'; Llobet 25', 36'	Report	Martínez 16'

Umpires:
Dawn Henning (ENG)
Ludmila Pastorova (SVK)

5 February 2003
15:40

Mexico	1–8	South Africa
Carmona 29'	Report	Christian 4', 9'; Van Breda 15', 30', 38'; Hector 17'; Dalling 23'; McNally 25'

Umpires:
Jean Duncan (SCO)
Lynette Hill (AUS)

5 February 2003
16:45

Lithuania	3–6	Netherlands
Zvinklytė 10'; Gatelytė 12'; I. Matjusaitytė 38'	Report	Moreira de Melo 17'; Schopman 25', 30', 32'; Van Geenhuizen 27'; Dijkstra 32'

Umpires:
Dawn Henning (ENG)
Irina Sivtsova (RUS)

5 February 2003
17:50

Russia	1–2	France
Timshina 4'	Report	Orefice 17'; Lazennec 16'

Umpires:
Heike Malina (GER)
Mirjam Wessel-Verwer (NED)

6 February 2003
10:40

Netherlands	7–0	South Africa
Schopman 16', 17', 20', 25'; Smabers 28'; Van Meer 34'; Romkes 38'	Report

Umpires:
Lynette Hill (AUS)
Louise Knipe (ENG)

6 February 2003
11:45

Russia	5–1	Mexico
Polovkova 5', 18'; M. Chegurdaeva 16'; Vassioukova 26'; N. Chegurdaeva 35'	Report	Martínez 14'

Umpires:
Mónica Rivera (ESP)
Ludmila Pastorova (SVK)

6 February 2003
13:00

Lithuania	1–3	France
I. Matjusaitytė 6'	Report	Agis 18'; Bergere 23', 34'

Umpires:
Ute Conen (GER)
Irina Sivtsova (RUS)

6 February 2003
16:15

Russia	9–2	South Africa
Polovkova 5', 17', 22', 31'; N. Chegurdaeva 11'; M. Chegurdaeva 13', 34'; Shentsova 18'; Kravtchenko 25'	Report	McNally 4'; Kotze 12'

Umpires:
Ute Conen (GER)
Jean Duncan (SCO)

6 February 2003
17:20

Lithuania	9–0	Mexico
I. Matjusaitytė 7', 8', 19', 28'; Gatelytė 12'; Zvinklytė 14'; Griskutė 17', 38'; Zumbakienė 35'	Report

Umpires:
Mirjam Wessel-Verwer (NED)
Lynette Hill (AUS)

7 February 2003
09:30

France	2–4	Netherlands
Bergere 9'; Boccara 35'	Report	Dijkstra 2'; Schopman 23', 28'; Goderie 27'

Umpires:
Heike Malina (GER)
Louise Knipe (ENG)

7 February 2003
14:00

Lithuania	5–1	Russia
Gatelytė 12', 16'; Povilaitytė 17', 35'; Caikauskienė 30'	Report	M. Chegurdaeva 40'

Umpires:
Heike Malina (GER)
Lynette Hill (AUS)

7 February 2003
15:05

Netherlands	15–0	Mexico
Moreira de Melo 5'; Goderie 10', 11', 34', 37'; Schopman 14', 30'; Romkes 15', 19', 35'; Dijkstra 17'; Verhage 22', 23'; Van Meer 26'; Versterre 37'	Report

Umpires:
Jean Duncan (SCO)
Mónica Rivera (ESP)

7 February 2003
16:10

France	6–2	South Africa
Bergere 4', 7', 12', 14'; Lazennec 28'; Lafaury 39'	Report	Van Breda 6', 38'

Umpires:
Ute Conen (GER)
Dawn Henning (ENG)

=== Classification round ===
==== Fifth to twelfth place classification ====
===== Eleventh and twelfth place =====
8 February 2003
09:00

Trinidad and Tobago	11–1	Mexico
Siu Butt 2', 10', 29'; Wynne 5', 15'; Trotman 10'; Dixon 21', 40'; Jones 24'; Gilbert 32'; Luces 36'	Report	Contreras 35'

Umpires:
Monica Rivera (ESP)
Irina Sivtsova (RUS)

===== Ninth and tenth place =====
8 February 2003
10:30

Australia	4–1	South Africa
Seaman 8'; Yorke 13'; Bazley 19'; Lupton 21'	Report	Christian 36'

Umpires:
Dawn Henning (ENG)
Ludmila Pastorova (SVK)

===== Seventh and eighth place =====
8 February 2003
18:00

Austria	4–1	Russia
Balek 9', 17'; Gebhardt 34'; Bauer 38'	Report	Grigoryeva 23'

Umpires:
Mirjam Wessel-Verwer (NED)
Anne McRae (SCO)

===== Fifth and sixth place =====
9 February 2003
08:30

Belarus	4–1	Lithuania
Laptsevich 5', 17'; Pekshtiarova 19', 33'	Report	Caikauskiene 4'

Umpires:
Louise Knipe (ENG)
Anne McRae (SCO)

==== First to fourth place classification ====
Semi-finals
8 February 2003
Germany	12
France	2
8 February 2003
Netherlands	5
Czech Republic	1

Final
9 February 2003
Germany	5
Netherlands	2
Third Place
9 February 2003
France	3
Czech Republic	1

===== Semi-finals =====
8 February 2003
12:00

Netherlands	5–1	Czech Republic
Schopman 10', 19'; Romkes 26'; Smabers 27'; Goderie 39'	Report	Míkesová 9'

Umpires:
Ute Conen (GER)
Heike Malina (GER)

8 February 2003
13:30

Germany	12–2	France
Becker 11', 19', 39'; Gude 14'; Cremer 18'; Rinne 23', 35', 38'; Hiepen 24'; Keller 26'; Böhmert 29'; Ernsting-Krienke 31'	Report	Morin 33'; Bergere 40'

Umpires:
Lousie Knipe (ENG)
Jean Duncan (SCO)

===== Third and fourth place =====
9 February 2003
11:30

France	3–1	Czech Republic
Llobet 20', 30'; Orefice 22'	Report	Brítová 33'

Umpires:
Ute Conen (GER)
Jean Duncan (SCO)

===== Final =====
8 February 2003
14:30

Germany	5–2	Netherlands
Gude 4', 13'; Böhmert 16'; Keller 17', 40'	Report	Van Geenhuizen 17', 23'

Umpires:
Lynette Hill (AUS)
Dawn Henning (ENG)

== Statistics ==
=== Final standings ===
Pos	Grp	Team	Pld	W	D	L	GF	GA	GD	Pts	Final result
1st place, gold medalist(s)	A	Germany	7	7	0	0	89	13	+76	21	Gold medal
2nd place, silver medalist(s)	B	Netherlands	7	6	0	1	44	12	+32	18	Silver medal
3rd place, bronze medalist(s)	B	France	7	5	0	2	27	22	+5	15	Bronze medal
4	A	Czech Republic	7	3	0	4	14	26	−12	9	Fourth place
5	A	Belarus	6	3	1	2	29	27	+2	10	Eliminated in group stage
6	B	Lithuania	6	3	0	3	24	14	+10	9	Eliminated in group stage
7	A	Austria	6	3	1	2	19	18	+1	10	Eliminated in group stage
8	B	Russia	6	2	0	4	18	19	−1	6	Eliminated in group stage
9	A	Australia	6	2	2	2	21	32	−11	8	Eliminated in group stage
10	B	South Africa	6	1	0	5	13	32	−19	3	Eliminated in group stage
11	A	Trinidad and Tobago	6	1	0	5	19	49	−30	3	Eliminated in group stage
12	B	Mexico	6	0	0	6	4	57	−53	0	Eliminated in group stage

Source: FIH

=== Goalscorers ===
There were 321 goals scored in 38 matches, for an average of 8.45 goals per match.

24 goals

- (Germany) Natascha Keller

15 goals

- (Germany) Fanny Rinne

14 goals

- (Netherlands) Janneke Schopman

13 goals

- (Germany) Anneke Böhmert

11 goals

- (Germany) Franziska Gude

10 goals

- (Australia) Gaye Kolsky

9 goals

- (Austria) Irene Balek
- (France) Peggy Bergere
- (Germany) Britta Becker
- (Germany) Nadine Ernsting-Krienke

8 goals

- (Belarus) Yulia Laptsevich
- (Belarus) Veranika Pekshtiarova
- (Netherlands) Maartje Goderie

7 goals

- (Lithuania) Irma Matjusaityte

6 goals

- (Russia) Elena Polovkova

5 goals

- (Belarus) Viktoryia Shliazhas
- (Belarus) Volha Shyntar
- (Germany) Melanie Cremer
- (Lithuania) Loreta Gatelyte
- (Netherlands) Sabine Romkes
- (South Africa) Linda van Breda
- (Trinidad and Tobago) Stacey-Ann Siu Butt

4 goals

- (Australia) Karen Seaman
- (Austria) Mariella Gebhardt
- (Czech Republic) Jana Springerova
- (France) Sophie Llobet
- (Lithuania) Virginija Caikauskiene
- (Netherlands) Miek van Geenhuizen
- (Russia) Marina Chegurdaeva
- (Trinidad and Tobago) Oire Trotman

3 goals

- (Czech Republic) Lenka Brtvova
- (France) Christelle Lafaury
- (France) Muriel Lazennec
- (France) Aurelie Morin
- (France) Celine Orefice
- (Lithuania) Vaida Povilaityte
- (Netherlands) Marieke Dijkstra
- (Netherlands) Fatima Moreira de Melo
- (South Africa) Brenda Christian
- (Trinidad and Tobago) Nicole Dixon

2 goals

- (Australia) Penelope Yorke
- (Austria) Marie-Christine Anderlik
- (Austria) Andrea Jelinek
- (Czech Republic) Karolina Mikesova
- (Czech Republic) Klára Poloprutská
- (Czech Republic) Eva Stankova
- (Germany) Stefanie Hiepen
- (Lithuania) Aurelija Griskute
- (Lithuania) Jurate Zvinklyte
- (Mexico) Azucena Martinez
- (Netherlands) Minke Smabers
- (Netherlands) Belle van Meer
- (Netherlands) Claire Verhage
- (Russia) Nadezda Chegurdaeva
- (Russia) Svetlana Grigoryeva
- (South Africa) Leanne McNally
- (Trinidad and Tobago) Yesenia Luces
- (Trinidad and Tobago) Blair Wynne

1 goal

- (Australia) Marika Bazley
- (Australia) Toni Cumpston
- (Australia) Alexandra Lupton
- (Australia) Merinda Simpson
- (Australia) Rhylee Swain
- (Austria) Katharina Bauer
- (Austria) Dagmar Schwarzmuller
- (Belarus) Iryna Halavinova
- (Belarus) Alesia Piotkh
- (Belarus) Elena Sukhanova
- (Czech Republic) Pavla Kozakova
- (France) Nathalie Agis
- (France) Sandrine Boccara
- (Germany) Denise Klecker
- (Lithuania) Kristina Zumbakiene
- (Mexico) Dafne Carmona
- (Mexico) Ericka Contreras
- (Netherlands) Elsbeth Versterre
- (Russia) Natalie Kravtchenko
- (Russia) Olga Shentsova
- (Russia) Galina Timshina
- (Russia) Tatiana Vassioukova
- (South Africa) Nadine Dalling
- (South Africa) Kate Hector
- (South Africa) Anli Kotze
- (Trinidad and Tobago) Sherlan Cabralis
- (Trinidad and Tobago) Jessel Gilbert
- (Trinidad and Tobago) Kecia Jones

Source: FIH
