= Tegan Fourie =

South African field hockey player

Personal information
- Born: 13 July 1998 (age 28) KwaZulu-Natal

Sport
- Sport: Field hockey
- Club: Tuks
Senior career
Years	Team	Caps	Goals
2018-2019	St. Lucia Lakers	-	-
2021-present	Tuks	-	-
National team
Years	Team	Caps	Goals
2017-present	South Africa indoor	76	(75)
2019-present	South Africa	18	(2)
2016	South Africa U21	10	(7)
Medal record
Representing South Africa
Women's Field hockey
Africa Cup of Nations
Gold medal – first place	2022 Accra
Gold medal – first place	2025 Ismailia
Junior Africa Cup
Gold medal – first place	2016 Windhoek
Women's Indoor hockey
Indoor Africa Cup
Gold medal – first place	2024 Swakopmund
Silver medal – second place	2021 Durban
Nkosi Cup
Silver medal – second place	2023 Cape Town
Silver medal – second place	2024 Cape Town
- Updated on 19 December 2024

Tegan Fourie (born 13 July 1998) is a South African field hockey player for the South African national team.

== International career ==
She made her début in South Africa Under-21 it 2016 at Junior Africa cup and Junior World Cup.

In 2017, Fourie made her indoor debut during a test series against Zimbabwe. She has gone on to represent the team in various test matches, as well as at the 2021 Indoor Africa Cup.

Despite never having made an international outdoor appearance, Fourie was named to the South Africa squad for the test matches Namibia. She was named to the South Africa squad for the Hockey Africa Cup of Nations for Ghana

== Personal life ==
Fourie is a type 1 diabetic.

She attended is St Mary's DSG, Kloof and graduated at the University of Pretoria.

His sister Cerian also is an international hockey player at Junior Africa cup and 2023 Junior World Cup.

== Honours ==
=== Indoor ===
- Test Matches: RSA v ZIM (2017) - Leading Goalscorer
- Test Matches: CZE v RSA (2019) - Leading Goalscorer
- Indoor Africa Cup 2021 - Leading Goalscorer
- 2024 South Africa Indoor Hockey Players of the Year
- 2023 HRH Tuanku Zara Women's International Indoor Tournament - Player of the Tournament
