= 2017 Women's African Hockey Indoor Cup of Nations =

International women's indoor hockey

2021 Women's Indoor Africa Cup of Nation
Tournament details
- Host country: Namibia
- City: Swakopmund
- Dates: 23–25 June 2017
- Teams: 3 (from 1 confederation)
- Venue: Dome Sports Complex

Final positions
- Champions: Namibia (1st title)
- Runner-up: South Africa
- Third place: Zimbabwe

Tournament statistics
- Top scorer: (South Africa) Heather McEwan (5 goals)
- Best player: (South Africa) Heather McEwan

The 2017 Women's Indoor African Cup of Nation was held in Swakopmund, Namibia. It was originally scheduled from 23 to 25 June 2017.

The competition featured three teams, with the winner securing a place in the 2018 Women's Indoor Hockey World Cup. The defending champions Namibia won the title by defeating the hosts South Africa 3(2)–3(1) in the final.

== Teams ==
Namibia
1. Petro Stoffberg (GK)
2. Jocelle Deysel
4. Sunelle Ludwig
6. Phea Gerber
7. Zalia Duvenhage
8. Marcia Venter
9. Jerrica Bartlett
10. Magreth Mengo (C)
11. Ina Louis
12. Gillian Hermanus
13. Dure Boshoff
18. Sonet Crous (GK)
South Africa
1. Hanli Hattingh (GK)
3. Amy Greaves
4. Kelly Madsen
6. Jenna Shuker
7. Shelley Higgo
8. Eloise Walters
9. Heather McEwan
10. Cindy Hack (C)
11. Kara-Lee Stella
12. Jessica O'Connor
17. Celia Seerane
22. Nicole La Fleur (GK)
Zimbabwe
1. Jaime Haasbroek (GK)
2. Lylie Wilde
3. Amy Brooke
4. Sarah Haycroft
5. Nicola Watson
7. Michelle Kabaira
8. Nicolle Grant
9. Cara Ross
11. Natasha Meth
13. Iman Johnson
16. Michelle Williams
17. Androniki Hiripis

== Results ==
=== Standings ===
| Pos | Team | Pld | W | D | L | GF | GA | GD | Pts | Qualification |
|---|---|---|---|---|---|---|---|---|---|---|
| 1 | South Africa (H) | 4 | 4 | 0 | 0 | 21 | 1 | +20 | 12 | Final |
| 2 | Namibia | 4 | 2 | 0 | 2 | 7 | 13 | −6 | 6 | Final |
| 3 | Zimbabwe | 2 | 0 | 0 | 2 | 0 | 21 | −21 | 0 | |

Source: FIH
Rules for classification: 1) points; 2) matches won; 3) goal difference; 4) goals for; 5) head-to-head result; 6) field goals scored.
(H) Hosts

=== Fixtures ===
All times are local (UTC+2).

23 Jun 2017
08:45

| South Africa | 7–0 | Botswana |
|---|---|---|
| Hack 5', 14'; Madsen 5'; Greaves 9'; McEwan 13', 14' | Report |

Umpires:
Violeta Eismayer (AUT)
Silke Pennefather (NAM)

23 Jun 2017
13:45

| South Africa | 4–1 | Namibia |
|---|---|---|
| McEwan 9'; Stella 22'; Greaves 26'; O'Connor 37' | Report | Venter 16' |

Umpires:
Joy Pieterson (RSA)
Salma Barthram (NAM)

23 Jun 2017
18:45

| Namibia | 3–1 | Zimbabwe |
|---|---|---|
| Hermanus 2'; Mengo 7'; Boshoff 16' | Report | Grant 33' |

Umpires:
Silke Pennefather (NAM)
Lyndal Robertson(RSA)

24 Jun 2017
08:45

| South Africa | 8–0 | Zimbabwe |
|---|---|---|
| Walters 1', 2'; Stella 9'; Higgo 14'; O'Connor 19'; Evans 20', 24'; McEwan 35' | Report |

Umpires:
Silke Pennefather (NAM)
Sharne Mayers (ZIM)

24 Jun 2017
13:45

| Namibia | 0–7 | South Africa |
|---|---|---|
| | Report | Walters 4', 8'; Stella 9'; Madsen 14', 40'; Greaves 15'; McEwan 18' |

Umpires:
Silke Pennefather (NAM)
Lyndal Robertson(RSA)

24 Jun 2017
18:45

| Namibia | 3–1 | Zimbabwe |
|---|---|---|
| Venter 1'; Hermanus 12'; Mengo 28' | Report | Grant 2' |

Umpires:
Violeta Eismayer (AUT)
Sharne Mayers (ZIM)

=== Final ===
25 Jun 2017
08:45

| Namibia | 3–3 | South Africa |
|---|---|---|
| Venter 2', 44'; Hermanus 12' | Report | Hack 4', 33'; Higgo 6' |
Penalties
| Hermanus (penalty shoot-out scored); Venter (penalty shoot-out scored); Deysel (penalty shoot-out missed) | 2–1 | Madsen (penalty shoot-out missed); Higgo (penalty shoot-out scored); Evans (penalty shoot-out missed) |

Umpires:
Violeta Eismayer(AUT)
Sharne Mayers(ZIM)

== Statistics ==
=== Final standings ===
| Rank | Team |
|---|---|
| 1st place, gold medalist(s) | Namibia |
| 2nd place, silver medalist(s) | South Africa |
| 3rd place, bronze medalist(s) | Botswana |

| Qualified for the 2018 Women's Indoor Hockey World Cup |

=== Awards ===
The following awards were given at the conclusion of the tournament.

| Player of the tournament | Goalkeeper of the tournament | Top goalscorer |
|---|---|---|
| (Namibia) Maggie Mengo | (Zimbabwe) Jamie Haasbroek | (South Africa) Heather McEwan |

=== Goalscorers ===
There were 41 goals scored in 7 matches, for an average of 5.86 goals per match.

5 goals

- (South Africa) Heather McEwan

4 goals

- (South Africa) Cindy Hack
- (South Africa) Kelly Madsen
- (Namibia) Marcia Venter
- (South Africa) Eloise Walter

3 goals

- (South Africa) Amy Greaves
- (Namibia) Gillian Hermanus
- (South Africa) Kara-Lee Stella

2 goals

- (South Africa) Celia Evans
- (Zimbabwe) Nicolle Grant
- (South Africa) Shelley Higgo
- (Namibia) Magreth Mengo
- (South Africa) Jessica O'Connor

1 goal

- (Namibia) Dure Boshoff

Source: FIH

== See also ==
- 2017 Men's African Hockey Indoor Cup of Nations
