= Namibia women's national indoor hockey team =

Namibia
- Association: Namibia Hockey Union
- Confederation: AfHF (Africa)
- Coach: Shayne Cormack

World Cup
- Appearances: 4 (first in 2011)
- Best result: 9th (2018)

Indoor Africa Cup
- Appearances: 4 (first in 2014)
- Best result: (gold) 1st (2017, 2021)
Medal record
Indoor Africa Cup
| Silver medal – second place | 2024 Windhoek |
| Gold medal – first place | 2017 Swakopmund |
| Gold medal – first place | 2021 Durban |
| Silver medal – second place | 2024 Swakopmund |

The Namibia women's national indoor hockey team represents Namibia in women's international indoor hockey competitions and is controlled by the Namibia Hockey Union, the governing body for field hockey in Namibia.

== Tournament record ==
=== Indoor Africa Cup ===
- 2014 – (silver)
- 2017 – (gold)
- 2021 – (gold)
- 2024 – (silver)

=== Indoor Hockey World Cup ===
- 2011 – 10th
- 2018 – 9th
- 2023 – 12th
- 2025 – 6th

=== Nkosi Cup ===
- 2023 – (gold)
- 2024 – (gold)
- 2025 – (bronze)

=== Tuanku Zara Cup ===
- 2023 – 5th

== Current squad ==
Squad for the 2025 Women's FIH Indoor Hockey World Cup.

Head coach: Shayne Cormack

1. Petro Stoffberg (GK)
3. Azaylee Philander
4. Sunelle Ludwig (C)
5. Kiana-Che Cormack
7. Danja Meyer
8. Jivanka Kruger
9. Jerrica Bartlett
10. Jaime Henckert (GK)
12. Gillian Hermanus (C)
15. Jahntwa Kruger
19. Taramarie Myburgh
20. Marika Neethling

== See also ==
- Namibia men's national indoor hockey team
- Namibia women's national field hockey team
