= Indoor Africa Cup =

Indoor hockey tournament

- Formerly: Indoor Africa Cup of Nations
- Sport: Indoor hockey
- Founded: 2017; 9 years ago
- First season: 2017
- No. of teams: 3
- Confederation: AfHF (Africa)
- Most recent champions: M: South Africa (2nd title); W: Namibia (2nd title) (2021)

Indoor hockey at the Indoor Africa Cup (IAC) was first introduced at the 2017 Men's African Hockey Indoor Cup of Nations in Swakopmund, Namibia.

== Men's tournament ==
=== Results ===
Year	Host	Final			Bronze medal match			Number of teams
Year	Host	Gold medal	Score	Silver medal	Bronze medal	Score	Fourth place	Number of teams
2014	Windhoek, Namibia	South Africa	Round-robin	Namibia	No playoff			2
2017; Details	Swakopmund, Namibia	South Africa	2–1	Namibia	Zimbabwe	No playoff		3
2021; Details	Durban, South Africa	South Africa	4–1	Namibia	Botswana	No playoff		3
2024; Details	Swakopmund, Namibia	Namibia	3–3 (4–3) penalty shootout	South Africa	Zimbabwe	No playoff		4

=== Summary ===
Team	Gold medal	Silver medal	Bronze medal
South Africa	3 (2014, 2017, 2021*)	1 (2024)	
Namibia	1 (2024*)	3 (2014*, 2017*, 2021)	
Zimbabwe			2 (2017, 2024)
Botswana			1 (2021)

* = hosts

=== Team appearances ===
Team	(Namibia) 2014	(Namibia) 2017	(South Africa) 2021	(Namibia) 2024	Years
Botswana	–	-	3rd	DQ	2
South Africa	1st	1st	1st	2nd	3
Namibia	2nd	2nd	2nd	1st	3
Zimbabwe	–	3rd	–	3rd	2
Total		3	3	4	

== Women's tournament ==
=== Results ===
Year	Host	Final			Bronze medal match			Number of teams
Year	Host	Gold medal	Score	Silver medal	Bronze medal	Score	Fourth place	Number of teams
2014	Windhoek, Namibia	South Africa	Round-robin	Namibia	No playoff			2
2017; Details	Swakopmund, Namibia	Namibia	3–3 (2–1) penalty shootout	South Africa	Zimbabwe	No playoff		3
2019; Details	Durban, South Africa	Namibia	2–0	South Africa	Botswana	No playoff		3
2024; Details	Swakopmund, Namibia	South Africa	3–3 (2–1) penalty shootout	Namibia	Zimbabwe	No playoff		4

=== Summary ===
Team	Gold medal	Silver medal	Bronze medal
Namibia	2 (2017*, 2021)	2 (2014*, 2024*)	
South Africa	2 (2014, 2024)	2 (2017, 2021*)	
Zimbabwe			2 (2017, 2024)
Botswana			1 (2021)

* = hosts

=== Team appearances ===
Team	(Namibia) 2014	(Namibia) 2017	(South Africa) 2021	(Namibia) 2024	Years
Botswana	–	-	3rd	DQ	2
Namibia	2nd	1st	1st	2nd	3
South Africa	1st	2nd	2nd	1st	3
Zimbabwe	–	3rd	-	3rd	2
Total		3	3	4	
