= 2024 Women's Indoor Africa Cup =

Indoor hockey tournament in Swakopmund, Namibia

2021 Women's Indoor Africa Cup

Tournament details
- Host country: Namibia
- City: Swakopmund
- Dates: 23–26 May
- Teams: 4 (from 1 confederation)
- Venue: The Dome

Final positions
- Champions: South Africa (1st title)
- Runner-up: Namibia
- Third place: Zimbabwe

Tournament statistics
- Matches played: 8
- Goals scored: 34 (4.25 per match)
- Top scorer: (Namibia) Azaylee Philander (6 goals)
- Best player: (Namibia) Kiana-Che Cormack
- Best goalkeeper: (South Africa) Sarah Paget

The 2024 Women's Indoor Africa Cup was held in Swakopmund, Namibia. It was originally scheduled from 23 to 26 May 2024.

South Africa won their one title after defeating the defending champions Namabia in the final 2–1 in a shoot-out after the match finished 3–3 in regular time. The top two teams qualified for the 2025 Women's FIH Indoor Hockey World Cup.

== Teams ==
The following four teams participated in the tournament:

~~Botswana~~
Namibia
1. Petro Stoffberg (GK)
3. Azaylee Philander
4. Sunelle Ludwig
5. Kiana-Che Cormack
6. Kyla Landsberg
8. Jivanka Kruger
9. Jerrica Bartlett
10. Jaime Henckert (GK)
12. Gillian Hermanus (C)
15. Jahntwa Kruger
16. Amber Dercksen
20. Annica Higgs
South Africa

Head Coach: AJ Spieringshoek

2. Jamie Southgate (C)
8. Cailynn den Bakker
11. Cerian Fourie
14. Tegan Fourie
15. Malikah Hamza
16. Jessica Lardant
17. Laikén Brisset
20. Charlize Swanepoel (GK)
25. Sarah Paget (GK)
27. Bonolo Moabi
29. Laylaa Davids
30. Elizabeth Porter
Zimbabwe

Head Coach: Christopher Fourie

1. Jenna Mathieson (GK)
2. Tanatswa Mutaramuswa (GK)
4. Sarah Evans (C)
5. Ruvarashe Mushavi
6. Stephanie Bwerinofa
7. Padiwanashe Chigumira
8. Nicolle Grant
9. Mufarowashe Matambo
10. Kelly Diplock
12. Tinodiwanashe Elijah
17. Farirai Nengare

== Results ==
=== Standings ===
All times are local (UTC+2).

The pools were announced on 2 May 2024.

Pos	Team	Pld	W	D	L	GF	GA	GD	Pts	Qualification
1	South Africa	3	2	1	0	20	1	+19	7	Final and 2025 World Cup
2	Namibia (H)	3	2	1	0	18	1	+17	7	Final and 2025 World Cup
3	Zimbabwe	3	1	0	2	5	26	−21	3	Third place match
4	Botswana (Note: Due to the delayed arrival of the Botswana Teams, in accordance with FIH Tournament Regulations for Indoor Competitions have been disqualified from the Indoor Africa Cup 2024.)	3	0	0	3	0	15	−15	0	Disqualified

Source: FIH
Rules for classification: 1) points; 2) matches won; 3) goal difference; 4) goals for; 5) head-to-head result; 6) field goals for.
(H) Hosts
Notes:

23 May 2024
15:30

South Africa	5–0 (Note: The match resulted in a walkover, after the Botswana team arrived late and did not made it in time for the game.)	Botswana
	Report

Umpires:
Fenestha Pienaar (NAM)
Sharne Mayers (ZIM)

23 May 2024
18:30

Namibia	12–0	Zimbabwe
Philander 3', 8', 29', 30', 39'; Cormack 3', 7', 14'; Ludwig 18'; Higgs 22', 23'; Bartlett 30'	Report

Umpires:
Ana Ortega (ESP)
Claire Cowan (RSA)

24 May 2024
15:30

Botswana	0–5	Zimbabwe
	Report

Umpires:
Fenestha Pienaar (NAM)
Claire Cowan (RSA)

24 May 2024
17:00

Namibia	1–1	South Africa
Philander 4'	Report	Moabi 13'

Umpires:
Sharne Mayers (ZIM)
Ana Ortega (ESP)

25 May 2024
12:30

South Africa	14–0	Zimbabwe
Hamza 2', 15', 28', 33'; C. Fourie 7', 38'; T. Fourie 8', 17', 36'; Lardant 13', 22', 40'; Den Bakker 28', 33'	Report

Umpires:
Fenestha Pienaar (NAM)
Ana Ortega (ESP)

25 May 2024
14:00

Botswana	5–0	Namibia
	Report

=== Third and fourth place ===
26 May 2024
12:30

Zimbabwe	5–0	Botswana
	Report

=== Final ===
26 May 2024
15:30

South Africa	3–3	Namibia
T. Fourie 4'; Lardant 8'; Davids 14'	Report	Bartlett 21'; Cormack 32', 33'
Penalties
Den Bakker (penalty shoot-out missed); T. Fourie (penalty shoot-out scored); Hamza (penalty shoot-out missed); T. Fourie (penalty shoot-out scored)	2–1	(penalty shoot-out scored) Hermanus; (penalty shoot-out missed) Philander; (penalty shoot-out missed) Cormack; (penalty shoot-out missed) Hermanus

Umpires:
Claire Cowan (RSA)
Ana Ortega (ESP)

== Statistics ==
=== Final standings ===
Pos	Team	Status
1st place, gold medalist(s)	South Africa	Qualified for 2025 Indoor Hockey World Cup
2nd place, silver medalist(s)	Namibia (H)	Qualified for 2025 Indoor Hockey World Cup
3rd place, bronze medalist(s)	Zimbabwe	

Source: FIH
(H) Host

=== Awards ===
The following awards were given at the conclusion of the tournament.

Player of the tournament	Goalkeeper of the tournament	Top goalscorer
(Namibia) Kiana-Che Cormack	(South Africa) Sarah Paget	(Namibia) Azaylee Philander

=== Goalscorers ===
There were 34 goals scored in 8 matches, for an average of 4.25 goals per match.

6 goals

- (Namibia) Azaylee Philander

5 goals

- (Namibia) Kiana-Che Cormack

4 goals

- (South Africa) Tegan Fourie
- (South Africa) Malikah Hamza
- (South Africa) Jessica Lardant

2 goals

- (Namibia) Jerrica Bartlett
- (Namibia) Annica Higgs
- (South Africa) Cerian Fourie
- (South Africa) Cailynn den Bakker

1 goal

- (Namibia) Sunelle Ludwig
- (South Africa) Laylaa Davids
- (South Africa) Bonolo Moabi

Source: FIH

== See also ==
- 2024 Men's Indoor Africa Cup
