= Laurine Delforge =

Belgian field hockey player and umpire

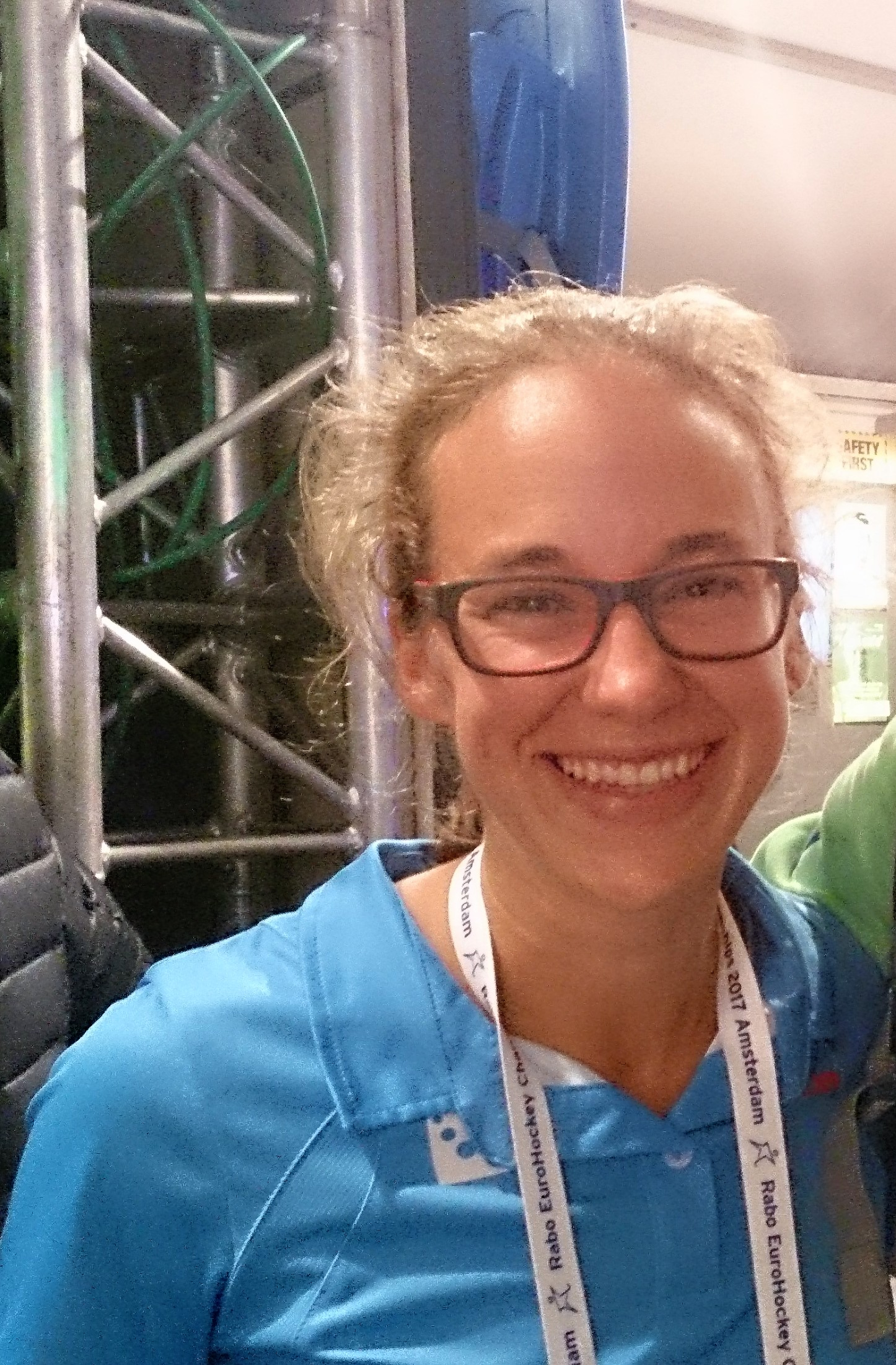
- Delforge after the European Championships in 2017
- Born: 18 July 1990 (age 36)
- Known for: Field hockey umpire
- Awards: 2016 FIH Umpire of the Year
- Field hockey career
- Sport: Field hockey
National team
Years	Team	Caps	Goals
2014–present	Belgium indoor	37	(18)

Laurine Delforge (born 18 July 1990) is an international field hockey umpire and a Belgian field hockey player. She was the winner of the 2016 FIH umpire award and was one of the two first women to umpire at the Euro Hockey League.

== Playing career ==
Delforge started playing hockey when she was 6. She started playing at Royal Parc Hockey Club in Brussels, but later moved to Royal Antwerp. Delforge currently plays for Royal Antwerp in the top Belgian league. She played for all the Belgian youth squads, but has never played for the Belgian national women's team. However, she has been a member of the national indoor field hockey squad since 2011.

== Umpiring career ==
Delforge started umpiring serious in 2008, and received her first international appointment in 2012. In 2016 Delforge won the Golden Whistle for best umpire of the year in Belgium. The same year she umpired in the Olympic field hockey tournament at the Olympic Games in Rio de Janeiro. She made history being the first Olympic debutant to also umpire the Olympic final. She also won the 2016 International Hockey Federation (FIH) Umpire of the Year award. During the 2018 Women World Cup in London, UK, Delforge umpired her 100th international game. She received the FIH 'Golden Whistle' for this achievement. She went on to umpire the final in that tournament.

In 2018 Delforge made history, together with fellow umpire Michelle Meister, by being the first female umpire in the Euro Hockey League, the annual European men's field hockey cup competition. Delforge has been selected by FIH to umpire at the Paris 2024 Olympic Games.
