= 2021 Women's Indoor Africa Cup =

Indoor hockey tournament

Tournament details
- Host country: South Africa
- City: Durban
- Dates: 16–18 April
- Teams: 3 (from 1 confederation)
- Venue: Thomas More College

Final positions
- Champions: Namibia (2nd title)
- Runner-up: South Africa
- Third place: Botswana

Tournament statistics
- Matches played: 7
- Goals scored: 103 (14.71 per match)
- Top scorer: (South Africa) Tegan Fourie (10 goals)
- Best player: (Namibia) Petro Stoffberg

The 2021 Women's Indoor Africa Cup was held in Durban, South Africa. It was originally scheduled from 25 to 27 September 2020, but was postponed due to the COVID-19 pandemic. On 30 December 2020 it was announced the tournament was rescheduled to be held from 15 to 18 April 2021.

The competition featured three teams, with the winner securing a place in the 2022 Women's FIH Indoor Hockey World Cup. The defending champions Namibia won the title by defeating the hosts South Africa 2–0 in the final.

== Teams ==
Botswana
3. Victoria Kgomotso
4. Irene Jeremiah
5. Naledi Makhandlela
6. Phoebe Jairus
7. Botho Motlhanka
8. Refilwe Botipeng
9. Lisa Eberhardt (C)
12. Tshepiso Jacob (GK)
15. Keene Paakane
16. Nonofo Marumolwa
17. Boitumelo Gabana
13. Pieter Jacobs
Namibia
1. Petro Stoffberg (GK)
3. Azaylee Philander
4. Sunelle Ludwig
5. Caitlin Gillies
7. Dure Boshoff
8. Jivanka Kruger
10. Magreth Mengo (C)
12. Gillian Hermanus
14. Taramarie Myburgh
15. Danja Meyer
16. Berencia Diamond (GK)
20. Kaela Schimming
South Africa
2. Jamie Southgate
4. Kelly Reed
5. Celia Seerane
6. Daniella de Oliveira
7. Edith Molikoe
10. Cindy Hack (C)
11. Cheneal Raubenheimer
12. Jessica O'Connor
13. Robyn Johnson
14. Tegan Fourie
20. Charlize Swanepoel (GK)
23. Chereé Greyvenstein (GK)

== Results ==
=== Standings ===
| Pos | Team | Pld | W | D | L | GF | GA | GD | Pts | Qualification |
|---|---|---|---|---|---|---|---|---|---|---|
| 1 | South Africa (H) | 4 | 4 | 0 | 0 | 50 | 1 | +49 | 12 | Final |
| 2 | Namibia | 4 | 2 | 0 | 2 | 51 | 6 | +45 | 6 | Final |
| 3 | Botswana | 4 | 0 | 0 | 4 | 0 | 94 | −94 | 0 | |

Source: FIH
Rules for classification: 1) points; 2) matches won; 3) goal difference; 4) goals for; 5) head-to-head result; 6) field goals scored.
(H) Hosts

=== Fixtures ===
All times are local (UTC+2).

16 April 2021
09:00

| Botswana | 0–26 | South Africa |
|---|---|---|
| | Report | O'Connor 3'; Johnson 4', 13', 15', 26'; Hack 5', 11', 11'; Reed 5', 22', 24'; Raubenheimer 9', 38'; De Oliveira 10', 20', 38'; Fourie 19', 20', 40', 40'; Molikoe 22', 23', 23', 24', 33'; Seerane 39' |

Umpires:
Liana du Plesis (NAM)
Claire Cowan (RSA)

16 April 2021
13:00

| Namibia | 30–0 | Botswana |
|---|---|---|
| Schimming 2', 4', 11', 26', 28'; Kruger 4'; Myburgh 6', 8', 23', 39'; Boshoff 8', 24', 24', 40'; Ludwig 17', 19', 20', 25'; Philander 18', 18'; Meyer 19', 29', 33', 38'; Gillies 27', 33'; Hermanus 30', 32'; Mengo 35', 36' | Report |

Umpires:
Sharne Mayers (ZIM)
Brun Lowe (ZIM)

16 April 2021
18:00

| Namibia | 1–2 | South Africa |
|---|---|---|
| Hermanus 38' | Report | Molikoe 12'; Reed 32' |

Umpires:
Liana du Plesis (NAM)
Claire Cowan (RSA)

17 April 2021
09:00

| South Africa | 18–0 | Botswana |
|---|---|---|
| Molikoe 1', 5', 37'; Fourie 7', 12', 23', 27'; Reed 10'; Raubenheimer 13', 31', 34', 40'; Seerane 15', 26'; O'Connor 24'; Hack 25', 35'; Johnson 36' | Report |

Umpires:
Claire Cowan (RSA)
Lefika Bulala (BOT)

17 April 2021
13:00

| Botswana | 0–20 | Namibia |
|---|---|---|
| | Report | Meyer 4', 6', 26', 31', 40'; Philander 8', 15', 16', 22'; Schimming 9', 21', 36', 38'; Myburgh 14', 29'; Hermanus 18'; Gillies 20'; Ludwig 24', 37'; Boshoff 34' |

Umpires:
Sharne Mayers (ZIM)
Liana du Plesis (NAM)

17 April 2021
18:00

| South Africa | 4–0 | Namibia |
|---|---|---|
| Hack 5'; Fourie 27', 31'; Seerane 35' | Report |

Umpires:
Sharne Mayers (ZIM)
Liana du Plesis (NAM)

=== Final ===
18 April 2021
14:00

| South Africa | 0–2 | Namibia |
|---|---|---|
| | Report | Gillies 9'; Ludwig 26' |

Umpires:
Liana du Plesis (NAM)
Claire Cowan (RSA)

== Statistics ==
=== Final standings ===
| Rank | Team |
|---|---|
| 1st place, gold medalist(s) | Namibia |
| 2nd place, silver medalist(s) | South Africa |
| 3rd place, bronze medalist(s) | Botswana |

| Qualified for the 2022 Women's FIH Indoor Hockey World Cup |

=== Awards ===
The following awards were given at the conclusion of the tournament.

| Player of the tournament | Goalkeeper of the tournament | Top goalscorer |
|---|---|---|
| (Namibia) Petro Stoffberg | (Namibia) Petro Stoffberg | (South Africa) Tegan Fourie |

=== Goalscorers ===
There were 103 goals scored in 7 matches, for an average of 14.7 goals per match.

10 goals

- (South Africa) Tegan Fourie

9 goals

- (Namibia) Danja Meyer
- (Namibia) Kaela Schimming
- (South Africa) Edith Molikoe

7 goals

- (Namibia) Sunelle Ludwig

6 goals

- (Namibia) Taramarie Myburgh
- (Namibia) Azaylee Philander
- (South Africa) Cheneal Raubenheimer
- (South Africa) Celia Seerane

5 goals

- (Namibia) Dure Boshoff
- (South Africa) Kelly Reed
- (South Africa) Robyn Johnson

4 goals

- (Namibia) Caitlin Gillies
- (Namibia) Gillian Hermanus
- (South Africa) Cindy Hack

3 goals

- (South Africa) Daniella de Oliveira

2 goals

- (Namibia) Magreth Mengo
- (South Africa) Jessica O'Connor

1 goal

- (Namibia) Jivanka Kruger

Source: FIH

== See also ==
- 2021 Men's Indoor Africa Cup
