= South Africa women's national indoor hockey team =

South Africa
- Association: South African Hockey Association
- Confederation: AfHF (Africa)
- Coach: Calvin Price
- Captain: Jamie Southgate

World Cup
- Appearances: 4 (first in 2003)
- Best result: 4th (2023)

Indoor Africa Cup
- Appearances: 4 (first in 2014)
- Best result: (gold) 1st (2014, 2024)
Medal record
Indoor Africa Cup
Gold medal – first place	2014 Windhoek
Silver medal – second place	2017 Swakopmund
Silver medal – second place	2021 Durban
Gold medal – first place	2024 Swakopmund

The South Africa women's national field hockey team represents South Africa in international indoor hockey matches and tournaments.

== Tournament history ==
=== Indoor Africa Cup ===
- 2014 – (gold)
- 2017 – (silver)
- 2021 – (silver)
- 2024 – (gold)

=== Indoor Hockey World Cup ===
- 2003 – 10th place
- 2007 – 11th place
- 2015 – 11th place
- 2018 – 11th place
- 2023 – 4th place
- 2025 – 9th place

=== Nkosi Cup ===
- 2023 – (silver)
- 2024 – (silver)
- 2025 – (gold)

=== Tuanku Zara Cup ===
- 2023 – (gold)

== Current squad ==
Squad for the 2025 Women's FIH Indoor Hockey World Cup.

Head coach: AJ Spieringshoek

2. Jamie Southgate (C)
6. Daniella de Oliveira
7. Edith Molikoe
8. Cailynn den Bakker
9. Kayla de Waal
14. Tegan Fourie
15. Malikah Hamza
16. Jessica Lardant
17. Laikén Brisset
23. Cheree Greyvenstein (GK)
25. Sarah Paget (GK)
29. Laylaa Davids

== See also ==
- South Africa men's national indoor hockey team
- South Africa women's national field hockey team
