= Women's FIH Indoor Hockey World Cup =

Indoor field hockey tournament

- Most recent season or competition: 2025 Women's FIH Indoor Hockey World Cup
- Sport: Indoor hockey
- Founded: 2003; 23 years ago
- First season: 2003
- No. of teams: 12
- Confederation: International (FIH)
- Most recent champion: Poland (1st title) (2025)
- Most titles: Germany; Netherlands (3 titles each)
- Qualification: Continental championships
- Website: FIH

The Women's Indoor Hockey World Cup is an international indoor field hockey competition organised by the International Hockey Federation (FIH). The tournament was first held in 2003 and it is held every four years.

== Format ==
Twelve qualified teams will be divided into two pools. The top two in their pool qualified for the first to fourth classification, while third and fourth qualified for fifth to eighth classification, the last two teams will play for last four placing.

== Qualification ==
Qualification is set by the governing body, the International Hockey Federation. The qualified teams include the host country, continental champions and the most recent World Cup final ranking.

== Summaries ==
#	Year	Host	Final			Third place match		
#	Year	Host	Winner	Score	Runner-up	Third place	Score	Fourth place
1	2003; Details	Leipzig, Germany	Germany	5–2	Netherlands	France	3–1	Czech Republic
2	2007; Details	Vienna, Austria	Netherlands	4–2	Spain	Germany	5–2	Ukraine
3	2011; Details	Poznań, Poland	Germany	4–2	Netherlands	Ukraine	4–2	Belarus
4	2015; Details	Leipzig, Germany	Netherlands	1–1 (1–0 pso)	Germany	Czech Republic	0–0 (2–0 pso)	Austria
5	2018; Details	Berlin, Germany	Germany	2–1	Netherlands	Belarus	2–1	Ukraine
-	2022; Details	Liège, Belgium	Cancelled due to the COVID-19 pandemic.			Cancelled due to the COVID-19 pandemic.		
6	2023; Details	Pretoria, South Africa	Netherlands	7–0	Austria	Czech Republic	3–1	South Africa
7	2025; Details	Poreč, Croatia	Poland	1–0	Austria	Czech Republic	3–3 (3–2 pso)	Germany

== Performance by nation ==
Team	Titles	Runners-up	Third place	Fourth place
Netherlands	3 (2007, 2015, 2023)	3 (2003, 2011, 2018)		
Germany	3 (2003*, 2011, 2018*)	1 (2015*)	1 (2007)	1 (2025)
Poland	1 (2025)			
Austria		2 (2023, 2025)		1 (2015)
Spain		1 (2007)		
Czech Republic			3 (2015, 2023, 2025)	1 (2003)
Ukraine			1 (2011)	2 (2007, 2018)
Belarus			1 (2018)	1 (2011)
France			1 (2003)	
South Africa				1 (2023*)

* = host country

== Team appearances ==
Team	(Germany) 2003	(Austria) 2007	(Poland) 2011	(Germany) 2015	(Germany) 2018	(South Africa) 2023	(Croatia) 2025	Years
Argentina	–	–	9th	–	–	–	–	1
Australia	9th	6th	8th	8th	6th	7th	10th	7
Austria	7th	7th	7th	4th	–	2nd	2nd	6
Belarus	5th	5th	4th	7th	3rd	DSQ	–	5
Belgium	–	–	–	11th	–	5th	5th	3
Canada	–	9th	–	10th	–	8th	–	3
Croatia	–	–	–	–	–	–	12th	1
Czech Republic	4th	11th	6th	3rd	7th	3rd	3rd	7
France	3rd	–	–	–	–	—	–	1
Germany	1st	3rd	1st	2nd	1st	WD	4th	6
Italy	–	10th	–	–	–	—	–	1
Kazakhstan	–	–	12th	12th	12th	10th	–	4
Lithuania	6th	–	–	–	–	—	–	1
Mexico	12th	–	–	–	–	–	–	1
Namibia	–	–	10th	–	9th	12th	6th	4
Netherlands	2nd	1st	2nd	1st	2nd	1st	–	6
New Zealand	–	–	–	–	–	11th	11th	2
Poland	–	–	5th	5th	8th	—	1st	4
Russia	8th	–	–	–	11th	DSQ	–	2
Scotland	–	8th	–	–	–	—	–	1
South Africa	10th	12th	–	9th	–	4th	9th	5
Spain	–	2nd	–	–	–	—	WD	1
Switzerland	–	–	–	–	5th	—	–	1
Thailand	–	–	–	–	–	–	8th	1
Trinidad and Tobago	11th	–	–	–	–	—	–	1
Ukraine	–	4th	3rd	6th	4th	6th	–	5
United States	–	–	–	–	10th	9th	7th	3
Uruguay	–	–	11th	–	–	—	–	1
Total (28)	12	12	12	12	12	12	12	

== See also ==
- Field hockey at the Summer Olympics
- Men's FIH Hockey World Cup
- Men's FIH Hockey Junior World Cup
- Men's FIH Indoor Hockey World Cup
- Women's FIH Hockey World Cup
- Women's FIH Hockey Junior World Cup
- FIH Para Hockey World Cup
