= 2026 Women's Nkosi Cup =

Indoor hockey tournament

Tournament details
- Host country: South Africa
- City: Cape Town
- Dates: 10–15 December
- Teams: 7 (from 4 confederations)
- Venue: Wynberg Military Base Stadium

The 2026 Women's Nkosi Cup is the fourth edition of the Nkosi Cup, an annual invitational international women's indoor hockey tournament in South Africa. It is held at the Wynberg Military Base Stadium, Cape Town, South Africa from 10 to 15 December 2026.

== Teams ==
Australia
2. Jamie Zimmerman
3. Kelsey Hughes
4. Genevieve Ferguson
6. Jessie Staples
8. Erin Burns
9. Samantha Economos
10. Ella White
11. Emma Scriven
12. Annelyse Tevant
16. Emma Leighton (GK)
17. Tegan Neowhouse (GK)
18. Alexandria Risetto
Ireland
Malaysia
Namibia
1. Petro Stoffberg (GK)
2. Jasmine Cartwright (GK)
3. Azaylee Philander
4. Sunelle Pretorius (C)
5. Kiana-Che Cormack (C)
7. Tamara Grögli
8. Jivanka Kruger
11. Abigail Rowles
12. Gillian Hermanus
13. Leila Grögli
14. Ottilie Hinda
15. Jahntwa Kruger
New Zealand
South Africa
4. Jehan Abrahams
5. Tatum Kroutz
6. Daniella De Oliveira (C)
7. Edith Molikoe (C)
9. Kayla de Waal
14. Tegan Fourie
15. Malikah Hamza
16. Jessica Lardant
17. Laiken Brisset (C)
18. Amber Fairon
25. Sarah Paget (GK)
33. Aphiwe Dimba (GK)
Zimbabwe

== Preliminary round ==
All times are local (All times are local (UTC+2)

Pos	Team	Pld	W	D	L	GF	GA	GD	Pts	Qualification
1	Australia	0	0	0	0	0	0	0	0	Final
2	Ireland	0	0	0	0	0	0	0	0	Final
3	Malaysia	0	0	0	0	0	0	0	0	Bronze
4	Namibia	0	0	0	0	0	0	0	0	Bronze
5	New Zealand	0	0	0	0	0	0	0	0	5–6 place
6	South Africa (H)	0	0	0	0	0	0	0	0	5–6 place
7	Zimbabwe	0	0	0	0	0	0	0	0	

First match(es) will be played: 10 December 2026. Source: FIH
Rules for classification: 1) points; 2) matches won; 3) goal difference; 4) goals for; 5) head-to-head result; 6) field goals for.
(H) Hosts

10 December 2026
08:40

Namibia	v	Malaysia
	Report

10 December 2026
10:00

New Zealand	v	Ireland
	Report

10 December 2026
11:20

South Africa	v	Zimbabwe
	Report

10 December 2026
17:20

Australia	v	Malaysia
	Report

10 December 2026
18:40

Namibia	v	Zimbabwe
	Report

10 December 2026
20:00

South Africa	v	Ireland
	Report

11 December 2026
13:15

Australia	v	Zimbabwe
	Report

11 December 2026
14:30

Namibia	v	Ireland
	Report

11 December 2026
15:45

South Africa	v	New Zealand
	Report

12 December 2026
09:00

Australia	v	Ireland
	Report

12 December 2026
10:15

Namibia	v	New Zealand
	Report

12 December 2026
11:30

Zimbabwe	v	Malaysia
	Report

12 December 2026
17:30

New Zealand	v	Malaysia
	Report

12 December 2026
18:45

Ireland	v	Zimbabwe
	Report

12 December 2026
20:00

South Africa	v	Australia
	Report

13 December 2026
18:15

South Africa	v	Malaysia
	Report

13 December 2026
19:30

Australia	v	Namibia
	Report

13 December 2026
20:45

New Zealand	v	Zimbabwe
	Report

14 December 2026
13:15

Australia	v	New Zealand
	Report

14 December 2026
14:30

Ireland	v	Malaysia
	Report

14 December 2026
15:45

South Africa	v	Namibia
	Report

== Classification round ==
=== Fifth and sixth place ===
15 December 2026
09:00

5th pool	M22	6th pool
	Report

=== Bronze ===
15 December 2026
12:00

3rd pool	M23	4th pool
	Report

=== Final ===
15 December 2026
18:00

1st pool	M24	2nd pool
	Report

== See also ==
- 2026 Men's Nkosi Cup
