= Nkosi =

Nkosi is a Nguni word for "king", "chief" and "lord". Nkosi is a common name and surname among Nguni people. Notable people with the name include:

== Given name ==
- Nkosi Johnson (1989–2001), South African child with HIV/AIDS who made a powerful impact on public perceptions of the pandemic
- Nkosi Ntsikayezwe Sigcau (1947–1996), South African anti-Apartheid activist
- Nkosi Tafari (birth 1997), American professional soccer player

== Surnames ==
- Agnes Nkosi (born 1987), South African professional football manager
- Duma Nkosi (1957–2021), mayor of the Ekurhuleni Metropolitan Municipality from 2001 to 2008
- Gabisile Nkosi (1974–2008), South African artist, community organiser and women's rights activist
- Kwanele Nkosi, character in the post-apocalyptic young adult horror novel The Dead by Charlie Higson
- Lewis Nkosi (1936–2010), South African writer and essayist
- Mxolisi Sizo Nkosi (born 1967), senior official in the government of South Africa
- Sithembile Nkosi, South African politician
- Siyabonga Nkosi (born 1981), South African footballer
- Themba Mbongeni Nkosi or Euphonik (born 1983), South African DJ, music producer and radio presenter
- West Nkosi (1940–1998), South African music producer, saxophonist and songwriter
- Willis Nkosi, South African Army officer
- S’busiso Nkosi (born 1996), South African rugby union player

== See also ==
- "Nkosi Sikelel' iAfrika" ("Lord Bless Africa"), a hymn composed in 1897 by Enoch Sontonga, which became a pan-African liberation anthem and was later adopted as the national anthem of several African countries
- Nkosi's Haven, an NGO in the Johannesburg, South Africa area
- Nkosi Cup, an annual, international indoor hockey tournament, South Africa
- Kosi (disambiguation)
- Pankosi
- Sun Kosi
