= List of current NRL Women's team squads =

Below is a list of current NRL Women's team squads. Twelve teams compete in the NRL Women's Premiership.

== Brisbane Broncos ==
The Brisbane Broncos are coached by Scott Prince.
Jersey numbers in the table reflect the team list announced for the Grand Final.
Table last updated on 5 October 2026.

J#	Player	Age	Position(s)	NRLW seasons				NRLW stats					Origin	Tests	All Stars
J#	Player	Age	Position(s)	Debut	2018–24	2025	2026	M	T	G	Pts	Prems	Origin	Tests	All Stars
1	Tamika Upton	29	Fullback	2019	11 26	13	14	64	61	0	244	3 2	12	8	2
2	Kerri Johnson	23	Wing	2025	—	13	13	26	21	0	84	1	—	—	—
3	Deleni Paitai	18	Centre, Second-row	2026	—	R	11	11	2	0	8	—	—	2	—
4	Georgia Bartlett	—	Centre, Five-eighth	2026	—	R	14	14	6	0	24	—	—	—	—
5	Julia Robinson	28	Wing, Centre	2018	34	12	14	60	40	0	160	4	12	13	—
6	Ali Brigginshaw	36	Five-eighth, Lock	2018	43	13	11	67	14	36	128	4	20	29	6
7	Jesse Southwell	21	Halfback	2022	27	13	14	54	9	158	352	2	8	3	—
8	Shannon Mato	28	Prop	2020	4 27	P	14	45	4	0	16	1	8	9	5
9	Jada Ferguson	24	Hooker, Five-eighth	2021	26	13	13	52	9	0	36	1	5	—	—
10	Brianna Clark	31	Prop	2020	2 4 20	11	12	49	4	16	48	1	2	9	—
11	Lauren Dam	29	Second-row, Centre	2021	2 17	11	14	44	20	0	80	1	—	—	—
12	Romy Teitzel	27	Second-row	2020	20 12	13	14	59	17	74	216	2 1	11	—	—
13	Lillian Yarrow	22	Lock, Prop	2024	3	12	13	28	1	0	4	—	1	—	—
14	Rhemy Hinckesman	—	Hooker, Lock	2026	—	R	12	12	2	0	8	—	—	—	—
15	Chelsea Lenarduzzi	30	Prop, Second-row	2018	42	13	14	69	22	0	88	4	9	1	—
16	Reegan Hicks	20	Second-row	2025	—	4	7	11	0	0	0	1	—	—	—
17	Harlem Walker	18	Second-row	2026	—	R	10	10	2	0	8	—	—	—	—
18	Caitlin Urwin	26	Wing	2026	—	RU	8	8	2	0	8	—	—	—	—
19	Tara McGrath-West	25	Second-row, Prop	2022	13	3	1	17	0	0	0	1	—	—	—
20	Linneke Gevers	28	Second-row, Prop	—	—	R	—	0	0	0	0	—	—	4	—
21	Breanna Eales	35	Prop, Lock	2023	4 4	10	—	18	0	0	0	—	—	—	—
22	Amanii Misa	19	Prop, Second-row	—	—	R	—	0	0	0	0	—	—	—	—
–	Skyla Adams	21	Five-eighth, Centre	2024	2	1	—	3	0	0	0	1	—	—	—
–	Azalleyah Maaka	26	Centre	2025	—	2	—	2	0	0	0	1	—	—	—
–	Tavarna Papalii	21	Lock	2024	8	R	1	9	0	0	0	1	3	5	—
–	Lila Parr	18	Five-eighth, Centre	—	—	R	—	0	0	0	0	—	—	—	—
IJ	Destiny Brill	23	Hooker	2021	6 6 18	11	2	43	12	0	48	1	11	5	2
IJ	Bree Spreadborough	28	Lock, Prop	2024	2	5	12	19	2	0	8	1	—	—	—
DV	Tia Molo	18	Centre	—	—	U	—	0	0	0	0	—	—	2	—
IS	Shalom Sauaso	18	Lock, Centre	2025	—	10	—	10	5	0	20	1	—	2
P	Hayley Maddick	34	Wing, Fullback	2021	29	13	P	42	14	0	56	1	1	—	—

Notes:

- Hayley Maddick will miss the 2026 season due to her pregnancy.
- Linneke Gevers and Rhemy Hinckesman were signed on a supplementary contract for 2026.
- The following players are on a development contract in 2026:
  - Breanna Eales
  - Tia Molo
  - Deleni Paitai
  - Lila Parr
- Supplementary contract player Rhemy Hinckesman was named on the interchange bench in the Round 1 team. Linneke Gevers and Deleni Paitai were named amongst the five reserves.
- The following players were on a development contract in 2025:
  - Georgia Bartlett (Queensland Country in 2024)
  - Amanii Misa (Queensland City in 2024)
- Tafito Lafaele was released in early April 2026, enabling her to take up a rugby union contract offer with the Blues in the 2026 Aupiki season.

The Brisbane Broncos announced contract extensions in several instalments from August 2025. The Brisbane Broncos announced player signings in several instalments from October 2025.

== Canberra Raiders ==
The Canberra Raiders are coached by Darrin Borthwick.
Jersey numbers in the table reflect the team list announced for Finals Week 2.
Table last updated on 27 September 2026.

J#	Player	Age	Position(s)	NRLW seasons				NRLW stats					Origin	Tests	All Stars
J#	Player	Age	Position(s)	Debut	2018-24	2025	2026	M	T	G	Pts	Prems	Origin	Tests	All Stars
1	Sheridan Gallagher	24	Fullback, Wing	2023	19	13	13	45	28	14	140	1	—	—	—
2	Isabella Waterman	26	Wing, Centre	2024	1	7	9	17	8	0	32	—	—	2	—
3	Leianne Tufuga	24	Centre, Wing	2021	12 16	11	13	52	15	0	60	1	—	1 7	—
4	Bobbi Law	29	Centre, Wing	2019	2 11 13	2	8	36	10	0	40	1	—	—	5
5	Mackenzie Wiki	24	Wing, Centre	2023	14	9	13	36	17	0	68	—	—	3 1	—
6	Krystal Blackwell	23	Five-eighth, Fullback	2023	15	12	13	40	11	0	44	—	—	—	1
7	Zahara Temara	29	Halfback, Five-eighth	2018	24 18	10	13	65	7	135	302	1	8	5	1 6
8	Chloe Saunders	27	Prop, Lock	2023	18	11	13	42	4	0	16	—	—	—	—
9	Chanté Temara	25	Hooker	2020	2 1 18	11	13	45	2	0	8	1	—	—	3
10	Sophie Holyman	28	Prop, Lock	2022	5 18	11	13	47	7	0	28	—	7	—	—
11	Jordyn Preston	23	Second-row, Centre	2024	2	11	12	25	7	0	28	—	—	—	—
12	Charlotte Basham	21	Second-row	2022	8	9	12	29	4	0	16	—	—	—	—
13	Hollie-Mae Dodd	23	Lock, Second-row	2023	15	6	12	33	6	0	24	—	—	11	—
14	Emma Barnes	22	Hooker	2023	14	10	13	37	3	0	12	—	—	—	—
15	Grace Kemp	25	Prop, Lock	2023	18	8	13	39	5	0	20	—	3	—	3
16	Lili Boyle	21	Hooker, Lock	2025	—	7	4	11	0	0	0	—	—	—	—
17	Grace Kukutai	29	Lock	2024	3	8	13	24	1	0	4	—	—	—	—
18	Ellie Brander	18	Prop	2026	—	R	1	1	0	0	0	—	—	—	—
19	Elise Simpson	19	Wing, Fullback	2025	—	9	9	18	14	0	56	—	—	—	—
20	Sereana Naitokatoka	25	Five-eighth, Hooker	2021	4 9 6	9	1	29	3	0	12	—	—	6	—
21	Madison Bartlett	31	Wing	2019	5 6 5 18	6	—	40	30	0	120	—	—	6	—
22	Relna Wuruki-Hosea	20	Wing, Centre	2024	3	3	—	6	2	0	8	—	—	1	—
–	Aaliyah Lomas	22	Lock	—	—	—	—	0	0	0	0	—	—	—	—
–	Evie McGrath	20	Fullback, Five-eighth	2024	3	6	—	9	1	0	4	—	—	—	—
–	Madyson Tooth	24	Centre	—	—	R	—	0	0	0	0	—	—	—	—
S	Simaima Taufa	32	Lock, Prop	2018	9 12 17	11	10	59	17	0	68	—	12	18	2
DV	Marley Cardwell	21	Prop	2025	—	2	—	2	0	0	0	—	—	—	—
DV	Isabella Piper	19	Lock	—	—	U	—	0	0	0	0	—	—	—	—
DV	Gabriella Savage	18	Centre	—	—	U	—	0	0	0	0	—	—	—	—
–	Holly Williams	18	Wing	—	—	U	—	0	0	0	0	—	—	—	—

Notes:

- Evie McGrath and Aaliyah Lomas were each signed on a supplementary contact for 2026.
- The following players were signed on a development contract for 2026.
  - Marley Cardwell
  - Isabella Piper
  - Gabriella Savage
- In late May 2026, Monalisa Soliola withdrew from the 2026 season at her own request.
- The following players were signed on a development contract for 2025.
  - Lili Boyle
  - Milly Caldwell
  - Madyson Tooth
  - Uta Utaisone Poka
- Lili Boyle was elevated into the 2025 squad to replace Ua Ravu.

The Canberra Raiders announced the release of seven players in late November 2025. The Raiders announced player signings in several instalments from December 2025. The Raiders announced contract extensions in several instalments from January 2026.

== Canterbury-Bankstown Bulldogs ==
The Canterbury-Bankstown Bulldogs coach is Brayden Wiliame.
Jersey numbers in the table reflect the team list announced for Round 11.
Table last updated on 11 September 2026.

J#	Player	Age	Position(s)	NRLW seasons				NRLW stats					Origin	Tests	All Stars
J#	Player	Age	Position(s)	Debut	2018-24	2025	2026	M	T	G	Pts	Prems	Origin	Tests	All Stars
1	Shanthie Lui	18	Fullback	2026	—	—	1	1	0	0	0	—	—	—	—
2	Simina Lokotui	20	Wing, Centre	2025	—	7	10	17	10	0	40	—	—	2	—
3	Daynah Nankivell	25	Centre, Wing	2026	—	RU	10	10	1	0	4	—	—	—	—
4	Monica Tagoai	27	Centre	2025	—	8	10	18	12	0	48	—	—	—	—
5	Elizabeth MacGregor	19	Wing, Fullback	2025	—	8	9	17	10	0	40	—	—	—	—
6	Andie Robinson	24	Five-eighth, Fullback	2022	5 6	11	11	33	8	0	32	—	—	—	—
7	Tayla Preston	26	Halfback, Five-eighth	2022	6 20	11	11	48	3	100	212	—	—	—	—
8	Kalosipani Hopoate	22	Prop	2022	24	10	9	43	3	0	12	1	—	4	—
9	Mary-Jane Taito	18	Hooker	2026	—	U	11	11	0	0	0	—	—	—	—
10	Alexis Tauaneai	21	Prop, Lock	2023	16	8	11	35	8	0	32	—	—	6	—
11	Leilani Wilson	23	Second-row, Prop	2026	—	R	11	11	0	0	0	—	—	—	—
12	Pauline Suli-Ruka	20	Second-row, Centre	2025	—	5	4	9	0	0	0	—	—	2	1
13	Angelina Teakaraanga-Katoa	24	Lock, Second-row	2022	1 18	10	11	40	2	0	8	—	—	9	—
14	Evelyn Roberts	18	Five-eighth, Hooker	2026	—	R	9	9	2	0	8	—	—	—	—
15	Latisha Smythe	22	Second-row, Lock	2025	—	7	9	16	0	0	0	—	—	4	—
16	Hope Millard	21	Lock, Prop	2025	—	6	11	17	2	0	8	—	—	—	—
17	Ma’atuleio Fotu-Moala	27	Wing, Centre	2024	6	4	5	15	5	0	20	—	—	—	—
18	Bridget Hoy	27	Wing, Fullback	2024	1	4	3	8	1	0	4	—	—	—	—
19	Moana Courtenay	26	Centre, Wing	2025	—	10	2	12	3	0	12	—	—	2	—
20	Waimarie Martin	21	Hooker	—	—	R	—	0	0	0	0	—	—	—	—
21	Giovanna Suani	18	Prop	2026	—	—	5	5	0	0	0	—	—	—	—
22	Paea Uilou	20	Prop	2025	—	4	4	8	0	0	0	—	—	2	—
–	Tamika Jones	23	Second-row	2026	—	RU	8	8	1	0	4	—	—	—	—
–	Shaquaylah Mahakitau-Monschau	20	Five-eighth, Hooker	2025	—	3	1	4	0	0	0	—	—	—	—
–	Evah McEwen	20	Second-row, Centre	2024	2	9	—	11	4	0	16	—	—	3	1
–	Leteena Medland	18	Prop	—	—	—	—	0	0	0	0	—	—	—	—
–	Ambryn Murphy-Haua	—	Five-eighth, Halfback	—	—	R	—	0	0	0	0	—	—	—	—
–	Ebony Prior	24	Hooker	2023	13	11	2	26	3	0	12	—	—	—	—
–	Ashleigh Quinlan	31	Five-eighth, Halfback	2022	6 17	10	9	42	7	0	28	—	—	8	4
DV	Aliahana Fuimaono	18	Second-row	—	—	R	—	0	0	0	0	—	—	—	—
DV	Milahn Ieremia	19	Wing	—	—	—	—	0	0	0	0	—	—	—	—
DV	Olivia Va'alele	18	Halfback	—	—	R	—	0	0	0	0	—	—	—	—
–	Anneka Wilson	23	Hooker, Halfback	2025	—	9	—	9	0	0	0	—	—	—	—

Notes

- Giovanna Suani and Leilani Wilson were each signed on a supplementary contact for 2026. Both players were named amongst the 17 players selected for Round 1.
- The following players were signed on a development contract for 2026:
  - Aliahana Fuimaono
  - Leteena Medland
  - Milahn Ieremia
  - Olivia Va'alele
- Evelyn Roberts played for Canterbury in the Lisa Fiaola Cup (Under 17) competition in 2024 and 2025 and Tarsha Gale Cup (Under 19) competition in early 2026. Roberts played for the Brisbane Tigers in the open-age BMD Premiership in 2025 and won the Steph Hancock Medal for the competition's best and fairest player.
- Mary-Jane Taito played for Canterbury in the Tarsha Gale Cup (Under 19) competition in 2025 and early 2026.
- The following players were signed on a development contract for 2025:
  - Waimarie Martin (Canterbury Bulldogs, U19 and Opens in 2024)
  - Leilani Wilson (Wentworthville Magpies, Opens in 2024)
  - Lahnayah Daniel Mahakitau-Monschau (Canterbury Bulldogs, U17 in 2024, U19 in 2025)
  - Simina Lokotui (Canterbury Bulldogs, U19 in 2025)

The Bulldogs announced player signings in several instalments from early February 2026. The Bulldogs announced contract extensions from May 2026.

== Cronulla-Sutherland Sharks ==
The Cronulla-Sutherland Sharks are coached by Tony Herman.
Jersey numbers in the table reflect the team list announced for Round 11.
Table last updated on 14 September 2026.

J#	Player	Age	Position(s)	NRLW seasons				NRLW stats					Origin	Tests	All Stars
J#	Player	Age	Position(s)	Debut	2018-24	2025	2026	M	T	G	Pts	Prems	Origin	Tests	All Stars
1	Jada Taylor	23	Fullback, Centre	2022	1 8	6	11	26	9	0	36	—	—	—	2
2	Cassie Staples	33	Wing, Centre	2022	1 16	13	10	40	17	0	68	—	—	5	—
3	Tiana Penitani Gray	30	Centre, Fullback	2019	6 10 20	12	8	56	20	0	80	—	12	3	—
4	Annessa Biddle	24	Centre, Second-row	2023	19	7	6	32	6	0	24	—	—	8	2
5	Georgia Ravics	32	Wing	2023	16	12	7	35	25	0	100	—	—	—	—
6	Madison Ashby	25	Five-eighth, Centre	2026	—	U7s	11	11	0	0	0	—	—	—	—
7	Chantay Kiria-Ratu	21	Halfback, Five-eighth	2023	11	13	9	33	5	31	83	—	3	4	—
8	Ellie Johnston	25	Prop	2020	3 12 20	13	10	58	16	0	64	—	6	3	—
9	Quincy Dodd	26	Hooker	2019	5 13 20	7	10	55	17	0	68	—	5	5	8
10	Manilita Takapautolo	20	Prop, Second-row	2024	7	13	11	31	1	0	4	—	—	1	—
11	Talei Holmes	26	Second-row, Lock	2020	10 19	13	4	46	0	0	0	—	—	4	—
12	China Polata	24	Second-row, Centre	2021	1 14	3	9	27	4	0	16	—	1	2	—
13	Anne-Marie Kiria-Ratu	20	Lock, Second-row	2025	—	9	10	19	1	0	4	—	—	2	—
14	Georgia Hannaway	25	Five-eighth, Hooker	2024	7	13	9	29	6	21	66	—	1	—	—
15	Stephanie Faulkner	21	Prop, Lock	2025	—	11	3	14	4	0	16	—	—	—	—
16	Caitlan Johnston-Green	25	Prop, Second-row	2019	3 20	3	11	37	5	0	20	2	4	4	5
17	Jacinta Carter	22	Prop	2023	3	8	8	19	1	0	4	1	—	—	—
18	Tegan Dymock	24	Lock, Prop	2021	6 19	5	9	39	2	0	8	—	—	3	—
19	Filomina Hanisi	25	Prop	2020	4 12 4 4	1	2	27	1	0	4	—	2	1	—
20	Olivia Herman	21	Halfback	2026	—	R	1	1	0	0	0	—	—	—	—
21	Milla Elaro	21	Wing, Centre	2026	—	U7s	4	4	4	0	16	—	—	—	—
22	Koffi Brookfield	19	Hooker	2026	—	R	4	4	0	0	0	—	—	—	—
–	Leilani Ahsam	20	Prop	—	—	R	—	0	0	0	0	—	—	2	—
–	Marewakiterangi Samson	21	Wing, Centre	2026	—	—	3	3	1	0	4	—	—	—	—
–	Nanise Vakacavu	21	Prop	—	—	R	—	0	0	0	0	—	—	2	—
IJ	Rhiannon Byers	27	Second-row, Centre	2023	11	7	5	23	5	0	20	—	—	—	1
IJ	Jaydika Tafua	20	Second-row	2025	—	9	7	16	2	0	8	—	—	1	—
IJ	Courtney Tyrell	19	Wing	—	—	R	—	0	0	0	0	—	—	—	—
IS	Najvada George	27	Lock, Second-row	2019	3 6 18	4	5	36	0	0	0	—	—	6	1
IS	Genevieve Mafi	19	Prop	—	—	R	—	0	0	0	0	—	—	—	—
IS	Grace-Lee Weekes	22	Centre, Wing	2025	—	8	H	8	1	0	4	—	—	—	—
P	Emma Verran	31	Five-eighth, Fullback	2021	13 18	12	P	43	17	0	68	—	11	9	1
P	Tyla King	32	Five-eighth, Fullback	2023	13	8	P	21	3	4	20	—	—	7	1

Notes:

- Chantay Kiria-Ratu kicked a field goal 46 seconds into golden point extra time to win the Sharks' Round 9 match against the Newcastle Knights on 31 August 2025.
- Koffi Brookfield and Leilani Ahsam were each signed on a supplementary contact for 2026.
- The following players were signed on a development contract for 2026:
  - Olivia Herman
  - Courtney Tyrell
  - Genevieve Mafi
  - Marewakiterangi Samson
- Emma Verran will miss the start of the 2026 season due to her pregnancy.
- The following players were signed on a development contract for 2025:
  - Stephanie Faulkner
  - Olivia Herman
  - Nanise Vacakavu
  - Tia-Jordyn Vasilovski
- Emma Verran played under her maiden name, Emma Tonegato up to the conclusion of the 2024 season.
- Filomina Hanisi sustained a ruptured ACL in Round 1, ruling her out for the remainder of the 2025 season.

The Cronulla Sutherland Sharks announced contract extensions in several instalments from November 2025. The Cronulla Sutherland Sharks announced player signings in several instalments from November 2025.

== Gold Coast Titans ==
The Gold Coast Titans are coached by Karyn Murphy.
Jersey numbers in the table reflect the team list announced for Finals Week 1.
Table last updated on 28 September 2026.

J#	Player	Age	Position(s)	NRLW seasons				NRLW stats					Origin	Tests	All Stars
J#	Player	Age	Position(s)	Debut	2018-24	2025	2026	M	T	G	Pts	Prems	Origin	Tests	All Stars
1	Lily Patston	25	Fullback, Wing	2025	—	4	11	15	3	0	12	—	—	—	—
2	Destiny Mino-Sinapati	21	Wing, Centre	2023	10	3	4	17	9	0	36	—	1	3	—
3	Jaime Chapman	24	Centre, Fullback	2020	9 5 17	5	11	47	30	0	120	—	11	5	6
4	Georgia Grey	22	Centre, Wing	2024	8	11	9	28	17	0	68	—	—	—	—
5	Indie Bostock	19	Wing, Centre	2025	—	7	11	18	11	0	44	—	—	—	—
6	Teagan Levi	23	Prop	2026	—	RU	12	12	9	0	36	—	—	—	—
7	Lauren Brown	31	Halfback, Hooker	2020	10 23	12	12	57	7	108	247	1	12	7	—
8	Laikha Clarke	24	Prop	2021	19	10	12	41	6	0	24	—	—	4	3
9	Georgia Hale	31	Hooker, Lock	2018	9 30	11	12	62	3	0	12	—	—	24	—
10	Fanua Rimoni	19	Prop	2026	—	R	9	9	0	0	0	—	—	—	—
11	Evania Isa'ako	31	Second-row, Wing	2020	3 30	P	12	45	21	0	84	—	6	4 2	—
12	Ivana Lolesio	22	Second-row, Centre	2025	—	12	12	24	3	0	12	—	3	—	—
13	Sienna Lofipo	21	Lock, Prop	2023	14	10	12	36	6	0	24	—	7	5	—
14	Lily Kolc	21	Hooker	2024	7	11	11	29	3	0	12	—	—	—	—
15	Eta Sikahele	19	Second-row	2026	—	R	9	9	0	0	0	—	—	—	—
20	Jasmine Solia	29	Second-row, Lock	2022	14	11	7	32	3	0	12	—	—	3 1	—
17	Takoda Thompson	20	Second-row, Prop	2025	—	10	12	22	1	0	4	—	—	—	—
18	Pauline Piliae-Rasabale	34	Five-eighth, Centre	2023	18	6	1	25	2	28	64	—	—	5	—
19	Aleksandra Tunufai	21	Centre	2026	—	R	1	1	0	0	0	—	—	—	—
16	Sarina Masaga	21	Centre, Second-row	2024	3	8	6	17	3	0	12	—	—	5	—
21	Enah Desic	18	Halfback	2026	—	R	1	1	0	0	0	—	—	—	—
22	Jessika Elliston	28	Prop, Second-row	2019	5 31	12	1	49	6	0	24	2	13	5	—
–	Sienna Ibrahim	19	Wing	2016	—	R	1	1	2	0	8	—	—	1	—
–	Lorren Ieli	19	Second-row	—	—	R	—	0	0	0	0	—	—	—	—
–	Rilee Jorgensen	21	Second-row, Prop	2023	12	H	—	12	0	2	4	—	—	—	—
–	Lailani Montgomery	21	Fullback, Five-eighth	2024	5	10	1	16	0	0	0	—	—	—	2
–	Natasha Penitani	26	Prop	2024	9	12	5	26	1	0	4	—	—	5	—
–	Keira Rangi	19	Second-row	—	—	R	—	0	0	0	0	—	—	1	—
IJ	Phoenix-Raine Hippi	20	Centre, Wing	2025	—	7	10	17	15	0	60	—	1	—	1
DV	Lilianah Lewis	—	Halfback	—	—	—	—	0	0	0	0	—	—	—	—
DV	Joshalynn Walker	18	Fullback	—	—	U	—	0	0	0	0	—	—	—	—
–	Torah Luadaka	18	Halfback	—	—	—	—	0	0	0	0	—	—	—	—

Notes:

- Lily Patston has been signed on a supplementary contact for 2026.
- The following players have been signed on a development contract for 2026:
  - Enah Desic
  - Torah Luadaka
  - Keira Rangi
  - Joshalynn Walker
  - Sienna Ibrahim
- Te Ngaroahiahi Fanua Awhina Rimoni was initially signed on a development contract for 2026 but was upgraded in late March to a full contract.
- The following players were signed on a development contract for 2025:
  - Estanoa Faitala-Mariner (returning from injury)
  - Phoenix-Raine Hippi
  - Savannah Roberts-Hickling
  - Eta-Fusi Sikahele
- Evania Isa'ako (née Pelite) missed the 2025 season due to pregnancy.

The Gold Coast Titans announced contract extensions in several instalments from October 2025. The Gold Coast Titans announced player signings in several instalments from March 2026.

== Newcastle Knights ==
The Newcastle Knights are coached by Ben Jeffries.
Jersey numbers in the table reflect the team list announced for Finals Week 1.
Table last updated on 20 September 2026.

J#	Player	Age	Position(s)	NRLW seasons				NRLW stats					Origin	Tests	All Stars
J#	Player	Age	Position(s)	Debut	2018-24	2025	2026	M	T	G	Pts	Prems	Origin	Tests	All Stars
1	Lucy Spain	18	Fullback, Centre	2026	—	R	11	11	2	0	8	—	—	—	—
2	Shanice Parker	28	Wing, Centre	2019	5 28	13	12	58	15	0	60	2	1	11	1 5
3	Sidney Taylor	24	Centre, Wing	2026	—	U7s	12	12	5	0	20	—	—	—	—
4	Tenika Willison	28	Centre, Wing	2024	7	12	12	31	10	0	40	—	—	—	1
5	Mercedez Taulelei-Siala	20	Wing, Second-row	2025	—	1	12	13	14	0	56	—	—	4	—
6	Kirra Dibb	29	Five-eighth, Halfback	2019	3 3 12 18	9	12	57	8	127	288	1	2	1	5
7	Georgia Roche	26	Halfback, Five-eighth	2023	18	13	11	42	10	4	48	1	—	13	—
8	Tayla Predebon	25	Prop	2021	7 27	12	10	56	10	0	40	1 2	—	—	—
9	Olivia Higgins	34	Hooker	2021	7 28	12	12	59	17	0	68	1 2	6	5	—
10	Tiana Davison	25	Prop, Lock	2022	8 8	13	11	40	6	0	24	2 1	—	5	—
11	Sienna Yeo	21	Second-row, Lock	2025	—	13	12	25	4	0	16	—	—	—	—
12	Fane Finau	20	Second-row	2025	—	4	10	14	6	0	24	—	—	2	1
13	Kayla Romaniuk	24	Lock, Prop	2022	24	12	12	48	6	0	24	2	—	—	—
14	Charley Lahmert	18	Hooker	2026	—	R	5	5	2	0	8	—	—	—	—
15	Emily McArthur	18	Prop, Lock	2026	—	R	5	5	0	0	0	—	—	—	—
16	Jules Kirkpatrick	23	Lock, Second-row	2025	—	13	9	22	3	0	12	—	—	—	—
17	Stella Lewis	18	Second-row	2026	—	U	1	1	0	0	0	—	—	—	—
18	Lilly-Ann White	21	Fullback, Wing	2024	5	6	2	13	6	0	24	—	—	—	1
19	Simone Karpani	29	Prop, Lock	2021	6 18	9	8	41	2	0	8	1 2	—	3	1
20	Amelia Pasikala	22	Prop, Second-row	2023	7 4	4	11	26	6	0	24	—	—	2	—
21	Cheyelle Robins-Reti	29	Wing, Centre	2023	18	10	1	29	5	0	20	—	—	1	—
22	Botille Vette-Welsh	30	Five-eighth, Fullback	2018	3 4 5 16	11	6	45	6	0	24	—	3	1	5
–	Lacey Cross	18	Prop	—	—	R	—	0	0	0	0	—	—	—	—
–	Nakia Davis-Welsh	30	Wing, Fullback	2023	2 4	8	—	14	3	0	12	—	3	4	7
–	Grace Giampino	22	Centre	2025	—	4	4	8	0	0	0	—	—	—	—
–	Joeli Morris	24	Lock	2021	7	4	—	11	1	0	4	1	—	—	—
–	Sienna Thomas	19	Halfback	—	—	R	—	0	0	0	0	—	—	—	—
DV	Mariah Brown	20	Centre	—	—	R	—	0	0	0	0	—	—	—	—
IS	Damita Betham	20	Centre	—	—	U7s	H	0	0	0	0	—	—	—	—
IS	Ella-Jaye Harrison-Leaunoa	19	Five-eighth	—	—	R	H	0	0	0	0	—	—	3	—
IS	Yasmin Meakes	32	Second-row, Centre	2020	—	13	3	55	15	0	60	—	—	—	—
IS	Evie Jones	21	Five-eighth	2024	5	R	H	5	2	0	8	—	—	—	—

Notes:

- Damita Betham and Grace Giampino have each been signed on a supplementary contact for 2026.
- The following players have been signed on a development contract for 2026:
  - Emily McArthur
  - Lucy Spain
  - Mariah Brown
  - Sienna Thomas
- Ella-Jaye Harrison-Leaunoa was signed on a development contract but was subsequently upgraded to a full contract.
- Following the first round, the club reported that three players would miss the 2026 season due to injury (Damita Betham, Ella-Jaye Harrison-Leaunoa, and Evie Jones) and a fourth (Lilly-Ann White) was expected to miss up to eight weeks.
- Captain Yasmin Meakes sustained a season-ending ACL injury in Round 3. Kayla Romaniuk was appointed captain for the remainder of the season.
- The following players were signed on a development contract for 2025:
  - Fane Finau
  - Mariah Brown
  - Grace Giampino
  - Mercedez Taulelei-Siala
  - Emily McArthur (added in September)

The Newcastle Knights announced contract extensions in several instalments from September 2025. The Newcastle Knights announced player signings in several instalments from October 2025.

== New Zealand Warriors ==
The New Zealand Warriors are coached by Ronald Griffiths.
Jersey numbers in the table reflect the team list announced for Round 11.
Table last updated on 14 September 2026.

J#	Player	Age	Position(s)	NRLW seasons				NRLW stats					Origin	Tests	All Stars
J#	Player	Age	Position(s)	Debut	2018-24	2025	2026	M	T	G	Pts	Prems	Origin	Tests	All Stars
21	Apii Nicholls	33	Fullback	2018	6 5 17	10	8	46	3	13	38	—	—	19	—
2	Payton Takimoana	23	Wing, Centre	2025	—	11	8	19	18	0	72	—	—	—	1
3	Mele Hufanga	31	Centre	2023	20	13	7	40	29	0	116	1	—	1 13	—
4	Stacey Waaka	30	Centre, Wing	2024	6	U7s	10	16	15	0	60	—	—	—	—
19	Tysha Ikenasio	29	Wing, Centre	2025	—	8	10	18	10	0	40	—	—	2	—
6	Gayle Broughton	30	Five-eighth, Halfback	2022	7 16	13	9	45	12	0	48	1	—	3	2
7	Patricia Maliepo	23	Halfback, Hooker	2025	—	9	11	20	7	30	88	—	—	2	—
8	Annetta Nu'uausala	31	Prop, Second-row	2018	4 5 15	11	9	44	5	0	20	1	—	14 6	—
9	Jasmin Huriwai	32	Hooker, Halfback	2026	—	RU	10	10	2	3	14	—	—	—	—
10	Matekino Gray	21	Prop, Second-row	2024	4	8	3	15	0	0	0	—	—	—	1
11	Maarire Puketapu	24	Second-row, Lock	2025	—	10	9	19	0	0	0	—	—	—	—
12	Shakira Baker	34	Second-row, Centre	2025	—	8	11	19	1	0	4	—	—	1	1
13	Kaiyah Atai	24	Lock, Second-row	2025	—	11	8	19	2	0	8	—	—	4	—
14	Capri Paekau	25	Hooker	2023	5	10	8	23	1	0	4	—	—	1	2
15	Harata Butler	33	Prop	2023	8 4	11	11	34	0	0	0	—	1	1	4
16	Ashlee Matapo	19	Prop, Lock	2025	—	8	7	15	0	0	0	—	—	2	—
17	Metanoia Fetalaiga	27	Prop	2025	—	5	9	14	1	0	4	—	—	1	—
18	Mya Hill-Moana	24	Prop, Lock	2021	25	—	6	31	1	0	4	2	—	10	5
22	Laishon Albert-Jones	28	Lock, Second-row	2023	20	9	1	30	5	0	20	1	—	3	1
1	Anastasia Sekene	28	Centre, Wing	2026	—	—	2	2	0	0	0	—	—	—	—
5	Lavinia Tauhalaliku	27	Wing, Centre	2025	4	3	4	11	11	0	44	—	—	1 3	—
20	Natalia Hickling	19	Halfback	2026	—	U	1	1	0	0	0	—	—	—	—
–	Felila Kia	22	Prop, Second-row	2023	3	1	—	4	0	0	0	1	—	—	—
–	Ocean Tierney	25	Wing, Centre	2026	—	—	3	3	3	0	12	—	—	—	—
IJ	Christabelle Onesemo-Tuilaepa	22	Second-row, Lock	2026	—	—	7	7	0	0	0	—	—	—	—
IJ	Emmanita Paki	23	Fullback, Five-eighth	2022	4	11	8	23	5	0	20	1	2	3	—
S	Ivana Lauitiiti	20	Prop	2025	—	6	7	13	4	0	16	—	—	3	—
IS	Tyra Wetere	20	Wing, Halfback	2025	—	6	—	6	5	0	20	—	—	—	—
DV	Patricia Heihei	18	Lock, Five-eighth	—	—	—	—	0	0	0	0	—	—	—	—
DV	Gezreyal Maiu’u	18	Second-row, Centre	—	—	U	—	0	0	0	0	—	—	—	—
DV	Asha Taumoepeau-Williams	17	Centre, Wing	—	—	—	—	0	0	0	0	—	—	—	—

Notes:

- Christabelle Onesemo-Tuilaepa and Anastasia Sekene have each been signed on a supplementary contact for 2026.
- The following players have been signed on a development contract for 2026:
  - Patricia Heihei
  - Gezreyal Maiu'u
  - Asha Taumoepeau-Williams
  - Ocean Tierney
- The following five players were unavailable for Round 1 due to injury or surgery recovery: Kaiyah Atai, Matekino Gray, Mele Hufanga, Anastasia Sekene, and Tyra Wetere.
- Two more players (Laishon Albert-Jones and Payton Takimoana) were added to the injury list after the first round match.
- Metanoia Fetalaiga previously played under her maiden name, Metanoia Fotu-Moala.
- The following players were signed on a development contract for 2025:
  - Ivana Lautitiiti
  - Sharnyze Pihema

The New Zealand Warriors announced contract extensions in several instalments from August 2025. The New Zealand Warriors announced player signings in several instalments from October 2025.

== North Queensland Cowboys ==
The North Queensland Cowboys are coached by Ricky Henry.
Jersey numbers in the table reflect the team list announced for Round 11.
Table last updated on 12 September 2026 (after Round 11).

J#	Player	Age	Position(s)	NRLW seasons				NRLW stats					Origin	Tests	All Stars
J#	Player	Age	Position(s)	Debut	2018-24	2025	2026	M	T	G	Pts	Prems	Origin	Tests	All Stars
1	Francesca Goldthorp	23	Fullback, Centre	2023	16	12	11	39	13	0	52	—	—	8	—
2	Charlize Lloyd-Phillips	23	Wing, Fullback	2026	—	—	7	7	5	0	20	—	—	—	—
3	Abigail Roache	29	Centre, Five-eighth	2023	20	10	8	38	12	0	48	1	—	11	—
4	Jasmine Peters	24	Centre	2021	8 18	12	10	48	18	0	72	—	5	—	6
5	Margot Vella	27	Wing, Fullback	2023	10	5	11	26	14	0	56	—	—	1	—
6	Lydia Turua-Quedley	27	Five-eighth, Hooker	2025	—	11	8	19	0	0	0	—	—	7	—
7	Rosie Kelly	26	Halfback, Five-eighth	2024	9	7	11	27	3	21	54	—	—	—	—
8	Essay Banu	24	Prop, Second-row	2023	8	12	10	30	2	0	8	—	—	9	3
9	Alisha Foord	29	Hooker, Five-eighth	2023	4	12	8	24	4	0	16	—	—	—	—
10	Ashley Marsters	32	Prop, Lock	2026	—	RU	9	9	3	0	12	—	—	—	—
11	Hailee-Jay Ormond-Maunsell	22	Second-row, Centre	2021	11	10	7	28	4	0	16	—	—	1	—
12	Bree Chester	24	Second-row, Lock	2023	17	12	11	40	5	0	20	—	—	—	3
13	Makenzie Weale	24	Lock, Prop	2022	4 9	11	11	35	7	0	28	1	9	—	—
14	Nadia Windleborn	20	Hooker	2026	—	R	5	5	1	0	4	—	—	—	—
15	Lily Dick	26	Second-row, Prop	2025	—	4	8	12	0	0	0	—	—	—	—
16	Tiana Raftstrand-Smith	23	Second-row, Lock	2021	11 16	4	7	38	9	1	38	—	2	—	4
17	Tafao Asaua	20	Prop	2024	2	1	5	8	0	0	0	—	—	1	—
18	Tallara Bamblett	22	Fullback, Five-eighth	2026	—	R	6	6	0	0	0	—	—	—	—
19	Emily Veivers	25	Second-row, Hooker	2026	—	E	2	2	0	0	0	—	—	9	—
20	Lyrech Mara	25	Prop	2026	—	R	1	1	0	0	0	—	—	—	—
21	Kayla Jackson	23	Second-row, Wing	2025	—	2	3	5	1	0	4	—	—	—	—
22	Jennifer Kimber	19	Fullback	—	—	R	—	0	0	0	0	—	—	—	—
–	Tayla Curtis	23	Second-row	2026	—	R	7	7	0	0	0	—	—	—	—
–	Haylee Hifo	23	Centre, Wing	2026	—	RU	2	2	1	0	4	—	—	2	—
–	Ana Malupo	20	Wing, Centre	2025	—	3	—	3	0	0	0	—	—	3	—
–	Ebony Raftstrand-Smith	21	Wing	2024	1	2	—	3	0	0	0	—	—	—	—
–	Sian Williams	22	Wing	2026	—	R	3	3	0	0	0	—	—	—	—
DV	Jakaia-Lee Collett	19	Second-row	—	—	R	—	0	0	0	0	—	—	—	—
DV	Ella Cronin	19	Prop	—	—	R	—	0	0	0	0	—	—	—	—
IJ	Lily Peacock	21	Prop, Lock	2023	11	12	—	23	2	0	8	—	—	—	—
IJ	Tallisha Harden	34	Second-row, Prop	2018	15 3 18	11	9	56	2	0	8	2	5	4	9
IS	Emma Manzelmann	24	Hooker	2021	12 18	12	6	48	9	6	48	1	8	1	—
P	Jakiya Whitfeld	25	Fullback, Centre	2022	2 9 9	9	P	29	14	0	56	1	—	7	—

Notes:

- Charlize Lloyd-Phillips and Lyrech Mara are each signed on a supplementary contact for 2026.
- The following players are signed on a development contract for 2026:
  - Jakaia-Lee Collett
  - Ella Cronin
  - Kayla Jackson
  - Nadia Windelborn
- The following players were signed on a development contract for 2025:
  - Tafao Asaua
  - Jennifer Kimber
  - Caitlin Tanner
- In addition to the full and development members of the squad, Tayla Curtis and Autumn-Rain Stephens-Daly were named to play in the trail match on 21 June 2025.

The Cowboys announced contract extensions in several instalments from November 2025. The Cowboys announced player signings from late April 2026.

== Parramatta Eels ==
The Parramatta Eels are coached by Steve Georgallis.
Jersey numbers in the table reflect the team list announced for Round 11.
Table last updated on 12 September 2026 (after Round 11).

J#	Player	Age	Position(s)	NRLW seasons				NRLW stats					Origin	Tests	All Stars
J#	Player	Age	Position(s)	Debut	2018-24	2025	2026	M	T	G	Pts	Prems	Origin	Tests	All Stars
1	Abbi Church	28	Fullback	2021	26	11	11	48	11	0	44	—	6	1	—
2	Zali Fay	25	Wing	2022	24	9	8	41	10	0	40	—	—	—	5
3	Rory Owen	22	Centre	2024	9	5	10	24	17	0	68	—	5	—	—
4	Jasmin Morrissey	23	Centre, Wing	2025	—	1	8	9	2	0	8	—	—	—	—
5	Freedom Crichton Ropati	18	Wing	2026	—	—	1	1	0	0	0	—	—	—	—
6	Cassey Tohi-Hiku	22	Five-eighth, Centre	2022	22	5	9	36	4	0	16	—	—	2	—
7	Rachael Pearson	33	Halfback	2021	12 15	11	10	48	6	107	241	—	5	—	—
8	Elsie Albert	30	Prop	2020	15 10	10	11	46	11	0	44	—	—	12	—
9	Layne Morgan	27	Halfback	2026	—	RU	5	5	0	0	0	—	—	—	—
10	Boss Kapua	21	Prop, Second-row	2023	5	5	9	19	1	1	6	—	—	—	—
11	Chloe Jackson	22	Second-row	2024	8	11	8	27	3	0	12	—	—	—	—
12	Mahalia Murphy	32	Second-row	2020	3 18	8	11	40	11	0	44	—	1	3	6
13	Keilee Joseph	24	Lock, Prop	2021	22 10	13	8	53	7	0	28	1 1	9	9	6
14	Taneka Todhunter	24	Hooker, Halfback	2023	13	8	9	30	2	0	8	—	—	—	2
15	Ryvrr-Lee Alo	20	Prop, Lock	2025	—	10	10	20	2	0	8	—	—	1 2	—
16	Fontayne Tufuga	19	Second-row	2025	—	2	8	10	0	0	0	—	—	—	—
17	Kennedy Cherrington	27	Lock, Prop	2020	4 23	6	5	38	5	0	20	—	9	6	5
18	Rueben Cherrington	23	Hooker, Lock	2022	12	11	7	30	5	1	22	—	—	—	2
19	Khyliah Gray	19	Lock, Five-eighth	2026	—	R	5	5	0	0	0	—	—	—	—
20	Tess McWilliams	20	Prop	2025	—	9	7	16	1	0	4	—	—	—	—
21	Fleur Ginn	20	Wing, Centre	2025	—	11	4	15	3	0	12	—	—	2	—
22	Kate Fallon	22	Centre	—	—	P	—	0	0	0	0	—	—	1	—
–	Rosemarie Beckett	23	Five-eighth, Fullback	2023	10	4	4	18	5	0	20	—	—	—	—
–	Rysh'e Fa'amausili	23	Centre	2025	—	2	—	3	0	0	0	—	—	—	—
–	Kiana Takairangi	34	Wing, Centre	2019	2 6 5	2	—	15	9	0	36	1	—	2 8	1
IJ	Jayde Herdegen	21	Halfback, Five-eighth	2026	—	R	3	3	0	0	0	—	—	—	—
IJ	Lindsay Tui	21	Centre	2022	7	11	6	24	0	0	0	—	—	6	—
C	Martha Mataele	27	Wing, Centre	2025	—	11	9	20	9	0	36	—	—	2	—
DV	Aaliyah Soufan	18	Halfback	—	—	R	—	0	0	0	0	—	—	—	—
DV	Tia Matthews	19	Second-row	—	—	—	—	0	0	0	0	—	—	—	—
DV	Taylah Falaniko	19	Prop	—	—	U	—	0	0	0	0	—	—	—	—

Notes:

- Khyliah Gray and Kiana Takairangi were signed on supplementary contracts for 2026.
- The following were signed on development contracts for 2026:
  - Freedom Crichton Ropati
  - Taylah Falaniko
  - Tia Matthews
  - Aaliyah Soufan

The Parramatta Eels announced contract extensions in several instalments from July 2025. The Parramatta Eels announced player signings in several instalments from October 2025.

== St. George Illawarra Dragons ==
The St. George Illawarra Dragons are coached by Nathan Cross.
Jersey numbers in the table reflect the team list announced for Round 11.
Table last updated on 13 September 2026.

J#	Player	Age	Position(s)	NRLW seasons				NRLW stats					Origin	Tests	All Stars
J#	Player	Age	Position(s)	Debut	2018-24	2025	2026	M	T	G	Pts	Prems	Origin	Tests	All Stars
1	Teagan Berry	24	Fullback, Wing	2020	32	9	11	52	40	1	162	—	3	—	—
2	Maria Paseka	20	Wing	2024	1	4	10	15	6	6	36	—	—	2	—
3	Tyra Ekepati	18	Centre, Wing	2025	—	5	8	13	3	0	12	—	—	—	—
4	Tahlia O'Brien	18	Centre, Second-row	2025	—	3	10	13	3	0	12	—	—	—	—
5	Shenae Ciesiolka	29	Wing, Centre	2020	32	8	10	50	19	0	76	2	13	3	—
6	Zali Hopkins	24	Five-eighth, Hooker	2022	19	11	8	38	5	0	20	—	—	—	—
7	Kasey Reh	20	Halfback, Five-eighth	2024	9	10	11	30	5	0	20	—	—	—	—
8	Amelia Huakau	31	Prop, Lock	2020	1 9	11	9	30	1	0	4	—	—	4	—
9	Brooke Anderson	30	Hooker, Lock	2022	5 20	12	11	48	5	0	20	—	1	9	2
10	Ruby-Jean Kennard-Ellis	23	Prop	2022	14	1	11	26	4	0	16	—	—	—	—
11	Montana Clifford	22	Second-row	2024	4	7	11	22	0	0	0	—	—	—	—
12	Ella Koster	21	Second-row, Lock	2023	14	10	11	35	9	0	36	—	—	—	2
13	Hannah Southwell	27	Lock, Prop	2018	3 13 19	9	11	55	4	3	22	1 2	5	2	—
14	Tori Shipton	18	Hooker	2025	—	6	8	14	2	0	8	—	—	—	—
18	Ahlivia Ingram	25	Prop	2023	2	9	6	17	0	0	0	—	—	—	1
16	Trinity Tauaneai	18	Lock, Prop	2025	—	9	10	19	1	0	4	—	—	—	—
17	Keele Browne	24	Centre, Wing	2021	23	11	5	39	6	0	24	—	—	—	—
18	Nita Maynard-Perrin	34	Hooker	2018	11 4 3 19	8	4	49	1	0	4	1	1	15	2
19	Jayme Millard	23	Wing, Centre	2025	—	8	8	16	7	10	48	—	—	—	—
20	Taliah Fuimaono	27	Five-eighth, Hooker	2021	13 8	8	7	36	6	0	24	—	5	3 3	6
21	Lavinia Kitai	22	Prop	2025	—	11	1	12	0	0	0	—	—	7	—
22	Sara Sautia	24	Second-row	2021	9 6	2	—	17	1	0	4	—	—	—	—
–	Montaya Hudson	20	Fullback	—	—	R	—	0	0	0	0	—	—	—	—
–	Arabella McKenzie	27	Five-eighth	—	—	RU	—	0	0	0	0	—	—	—	—
–	Charis Toli	18	Centre	—	—	R	—	0	0	0	0	—	—	—	—
DV	Ella Churchill	17	Centre, Wing	—	—	R	—	0	0	0	0	—	—	—	—
DV	Chelsea Savill	21	Hooker	2024	3	6	—	9	0	0	0	—	—	—	—
DV	Paige Tauaneai	18	Second-row	—	—	R	—	0	0	0	0	—	—	—	—
S	Seriah Palepale	18	Prop	2026	—	R	1	1	0	0	0	—	—	—	—
Z	Skye Spencer	18	Five-eighth	—	—	R	—	0	0	0	0	—	—	—	—
–	Danii Gray	19	Hooker	—	—	D	—	0	0	0	0	—	—	—	—
–	Mackenzie Lear	22	Prop	—	—	R	—	0	0	0	0	—	—	—	—
DV	Halle Barrett	17	Centre	—	—	—	—	0	0	0	0	—	—	—	—
IS	Madison Mulhall	22	Prop, Second-row	2023	10	11	4	25	2	0	8	—	—	—	—
IS	Bronte Wilson	20	Prop	2024	4	9	H	13	1	0	4	—	—	1	—

Notes:

- Amelia Huakau and Ruby-Jean Kennard Ellis have each been signed on a supplementary contact for 2026.
- The following players have been signed on a development contract for 2026:
  - Ella Churchill
  - Chelsea Savill
  - Skye Spencer
  - Paige Tauaneai
  - Charis Toli
- Halle Barrett was signed on a development contract for 2027.
- Supplementary contract player Ruby-Jean Kennard Ellis was named as a starting prop in Round 1.
- The following players were signed on a development contract for 2025:
  - Tahlia O'Brien
  - Maria Paseka
  - Seriah Palepale
  - Paige Tauaneai

The Dragons announced contract extensions in several instalments from July 2025. The Dragons announced player signings in several instalments from April 2025.

== Sydney Roosters ==
The Sydney Roosters are coached by John Strange.
Jersey numbers in the table reflect the team list announced for the Grand Final.
Table last updated on 5 October 2026.

J#	Player	Age	Position(s)	NRLW seasons				NRLW stats					Origin	Tests	All Stars
J#	Player	Age	Position(s)	Debut	2018-24	2025	2026	M	T	G	Pts	Prems	Origin	Tests	All Stars
1	Corban Baxter	32	Fullback, Five-eighth	2019	22	9	13	44	13	0	52	2	10	7	1 4
2	Brydie Parker	26	Wing, Fullback	2018	28	13	13	54	28	0	112	3	—	—	—
3	Jessica Sergis	29	Centre	2018	10 23	13	13	59	45	0	180	3	16	14	—
4	Isabelle Kelly	30	Centre	2018	7 2 34	12	13	68	30	0	120	3	19	20	1
5	Jayme Fressard	29	Wing, Centre	2020	3 4 22	8	10	47	36	0	144	1 2	6	—	—
6	Jocelyn Kelleher	26	Five-eighth, Halfback	2020	38	13	13	64	8	169	371	3	6	—	—
7	Tarryn Aiken	27	Halfback, Five-eighth	2019	19 19	7	11	56	24	7	111	2 2	11	10	—
8	Millie Elliott	28	Prop	2019	13 7 18	P	13	51	10	0	40	2 1 2	12	4	—
9	Keeley Nizza	26	Hooker	2018	23 20	13	13	69	12	0	48	2	13	9	—
10	Otesa Pule	23	Prop, Second-row	2022	27	13	13	53	11	0	44	2	3	13	—
11	Sariah Paki	24	Second-row, Centre	2026	—	U7s	13	13	6	0	24	1	—	—	—
12	Jasmin Strange	23	Second-row, Centre	2022	1 11 11	13	13	49	11	0	44	1 2	—	—	4
13	Olivia Kernick	25	Lock, Second-row	2021	34	13	13	60	24	0	96	3	12	10	3 2
14	Taina Naividi	25	Wing, Hooker	2021	5 6	11	9	31	16	0	64	2	—	2	—
15	Aliyah Nasio	20	Second-row, Lock	2024	4	12	10	26	4	0	16	2	—	—	—
16	Rima Butler	28	Prop	2022	5 15	13	12	45	9	0	36	1 1	2	3	3
17	Amber Hall	31	Second-row, Prop	2019	18 11	11	9	49	16	0	64	2 2	—	14	—
18	Mia Wood	27	Wing, Second-row	2023	14	13	4	31	16	0	64	2	—	—	—
19	Taneisha Gray	21	Second-row	2025	—	2	2	4	1	0	4	1	—	—	1
20	Nikiah Campbell	25	Second-row	—	—	R	—	0	0	0	0	—	—	—	—
21	Shawden Burton	26	Hooker	2021	13	7	5	25	0	0	0	2	—	—	—
22	Keighley Simpson	21	Centre, Wing	2025	—	3	1	4	4	0	16	1	—	—	—
–	Tatum Bird	26	Halfback	—	—	RU	—	0	0	0	0	—	—	—	—
–	Eliza Lopamaua	21	Second-row, Prop	2024	4	11	—	15	2	0	8	1	—	2	—
–	Talea Tonga	18	Halfback	—	—	R	—	0	0	0	0	—	—	—	—
IS	Macie Carlile	25	Prop, Second-row	2023	3	12	3	18	2	0	8	1	—	—	—
DV	Logan Fletcher	19	Wing	2025	—	1	—	1	1	0	4	—	—	—	—
DV	Te Raukura Leafe	19	Prop, Second-row	—	—	U	—	0	0	0	0	—	—	—	—
DV	Anastasia Leatupue	18	Prop	—	—	—	—	0	0	0	0	—	—	—	—
DV	Mia Vaotu'au	18	Fullback	—	—	—	—	0	0	0	0	—	—	—	—
Z	Mahlie Cashin	19	Hooker	—	—	R	—	0	0	0	0	—	—	—	—

Notes:

- Nikiah Campbell and Keighley Simpson were signed on a supplementary contract for 2026
- The following players were signed on a development contract for 2026.
  - Mahlie Cashin
  - Te Raukura Leafe
  - Logan Fletcher
  - Mia Vaotuua (who played for the Central Coast Roosters, Tarsha Gale side in 2026)
- The following players were signed on a development contract for 2025.
  - Mahlie Cashin (who played for the Sydney Roosters Indigenous Academy, Tarsha Gale Cup side in 2025)
  - Sienna Thomas
  - Talea Tonga (who played for the Central Coast Roosters, Lisa Fiaola side in 2025)
- Millie Elliott missed the 2025 season due to pregnancy.

The Sydney Roosters announced contract extensions in several instalments from August 2025.

== Wests Tigers ==
The Wests Tigers are coached by Craig Sandercock.
Jersey numbers in the table reflect the team list announced for Finals Week 1.
Table last updated on 19 September 2026.

J#	Player	Age	Position(s)	NRLW seasons				NRLW stats					Origin	Tests	All Stars
J#	Player	Age	Position(s)	Debut	2018-24	2025	2026	M	T	G	Pts	Prems	Origin	Tests	All Stars
1	Caitlin Turnbull	25	Fullback, Wing	2025	—	10	10	20	11	0	44	—	—	—	1
2	Harmony Crichton	19	Wing, Centre	2024	3	3	9	15	1	0	4	—	—	—	—
3	Rikeya Horne	27	Centre, Wing	2018	7 11 16	P	3	37	10	0	40	—	—	—	—
4	Portia Bourke	26	Centre, Lock	2025	—	4	9	13	0	0	0	—	—	—	—
5	Lily Rogan	22	Wing, Centre	2023	1	10	12	23	6	0	24	—	—	2	—
6	Losana Lutu	22	Five-eighth, Halfback	2022	1 12	4	9	26	4	3	22	—	—	2	—
7	Raecene McGregor	28	Halfback	2018	3 8 12 18	7	12	60	5	78	177	2 1	—	19	6
8	Sarah Togatuki	28	Prop, Lock	2018	19 16	11	12	58	9	0	36	1	11	1 5	—
9	Salma Nour	23	Hooker	2023	10	7	11	28	9	0	36	—	—	1	—
10	Shaniece Monschau	24	Prop, Second-row	2025	—	11	12	23	2	0	8	—	—	2	—
11	Kezie Apps	35	Second-row, Prop	2018	19 10	11	10	50	9	0	36	—	20	22	2
12	Shaylee Bent	26	Second-row, Centre	2019	19 20	12	12	63	8	0	32	—	4	4	7
13	Holli Wheeler	36	Lock, Prop	2018	20 17	9	11	57	2	2	12	—	3	5	—
14	Christian Pio	26	Prop, Second-row	2021	11 18	4	12	45	4	0	16	—	—	3	—
15	Shenai Lendill	26	Centre, Second-row	2023	18	11	11	40	3	0	12	—	—	—	—
16	Jetaya Faifua	23	Five-eighth, Fullback	2021	7 11	11	2	31	6	0	24	—	—	5	—
17	Brooke Talataina	22	Second-row, Halfback	2023	12	H	9	21	1	0	4	—	—	1	—
18	Tara Reinke	27	Lock, Prop	2023	7 9	11	7	34	0	0	0	—	—	—	—
19	Namoe Gesa	18	Centre	2026	—	R	8	8	2	0	8	—	—	—	—
20	Kayla Henderson	—	Fullback, Wing	2026	—	R	4	4	0	0	0	—	—	—	—
21	Emily Bass	27	Wing, Centre	2021	7 11	11	6	35	20	6	92	—	5	—	—
22	Tyla Amiatu	23	Prop, Lock	2023	13	1	2	16	2	0	8	—	—	—	—
–	Vasaliva Feleti	18	Centre, Wing	—	—	—	—	0	0	0	0	—	—	—	—
–	Lucyannah Luamanu-Leiataua	19	Lock, Second-row	2025	—	4	—	4	0	0	0	—	—	—	—
IJ	Faythe Manera	23	Five-eighth, Halfback	2025	—	9	10	19	9	0	36	—	—	—	—
Z	Harmony Kautai	22	Centre, Wing	—	—	RU	—	0	0	0	0	—	—	—	—
DV	Lahnayah Daniel	19	Lock	—	—	D	—	0	0	0	0	—	—	—	—
DV	Diamond Graham	18	Hooker	—	—	—	—	0	0	0	0	—	—	—	—
IJ	Leah Ollerton	22	Hooker	2026	—	R	1	1	0	0	0	—	—	—	—
IJ	Terina Te Tamaki	29	Centre, Wing	2025	—	4	—	4	0	0	0	—	—	—	—
P	Pihuka Berryman-Duff	25	Hooker, Lock	2023	9	11	P	20	1	0	4	—	—	6	—
P	Jade Fonua	29	Lock	2023	14	11	P	25	0	0	0	—	—	4	—

Notes:

- Pihuka Berryman-Duff will miss the 2026 season due to her pregnancy. Salma Nour was signed as her replacement in the squad.
- The following players are signed on a development contract for 2026:
  - Lahnayah Daniel (Canterbury Bulldogs, U19 9 games in 2025, Open 6 games in 2025)
  - Vasaliva Feleti (North Sydney Bears, U19 5 games in 2026)
  - Diamond Graham (Tweed Heads Seagulls, U19, 2 games in 2026)
  - Kayla Henderson (Penrith Panthers, U19 10 games in 2025, Newcastle Knights Open 12 games in 2025)
- The following players were signed on a development contract for 2025:
  - Tallara Bamblett (Parramatta Eels, Open 7 games in 2024)
  - Aaliyah Bula
  - Tiresa Leasuasu (Wests Tigers, U19 8 games in 2025)
  - Lucyannah Luamanu-Leiataua (Wests Tigers, U19 10 games in 2025, Open 9 games in 2024)

The Wests Tigers announced contract extensions in several instalments from October 2025. The Wests Tigers announced player signings in several instalments from October 2025.

== Unsigned players ==
The following players from the 2024 and 2025 NRLW seasons are currently unsigned, or their contract with a club for the 2026 NRLW season is yet to be announced by the club or NRL.
Each NRLW club is permitted to have 24 players in their roster.
Table last updated: 22 July 2026.

HN	Player	Age	Position(s)	NRLW seasons				NRLW stats					Origin	Tests	All Stars
HN	Player	Age	Position(s)	Debut	2018-24	2025	2026	M	T	G	Pts	Prems	Origin	Tests	All Stars
–	Therese Aiton	37	Hooker	2021	2	R	R	2	0	0	0	—	1	8	—
–	Ngatokotoru Arakua	29	Prop	2018	4 4 2 3	2	R	15	3	0	12	1	—	9 3	—
–	Yasmine Baker	21	Fullback	—	—	R	R	0	0	0	0	—	—	—	—
–	Emily Bella	22	Halfback	—	—	R	R	0	0	0	0	—	—	—	—
–	Bianca Bennetts	25	Prop	2023	2	—	R	2	0	0	0	—	—	—	—
–	Tyler Birch	30	Five-eighth	2020	2	R	R	2	0	0	0	1	—	1	1
P	Michaela Brake	30	Wing, Centre	2025	—	4	—	4	2	0	8	—	—	—	—
–	Annette Brander	33	Lock, Second-row	2018	3 8 1	R	R	12	1	0	4	2	6	10	3
–	Brittany Breayley-Nati	35	Hooker	2018	4 4 31	3	R	42	4	0	16	1	7	10	—
–	Claudia Brown	21	Second-row, Prop	2024	2	R	R	2	0	0	0	—	—	1	—
–	Aaliyah Bula	21	Centre	—	—	R	—	0	0	0	0	—	—	—	—
–	Sophie Buller	25	Lock	—	1	R	—	1	0	0	0	—	—	—	—
–	Zara Canfield	25	Second-row	2021	24	R	R	24	3	8	28	—	—	—	—
–	Avery-Rose Carmont	25	Hooker	2025	—	4	R	4	0	0	0	—	—	—	—
–	Sophie Clancy	23	Hooker, Lock	2023	8	R	—	8	1	0	4	—	—	—	—
–	Keisha-Leigh Coolwell	26	Centre	—	—	R	R	0	0	0	0	—	—	—	—
–	Kaarla Cowan	28	Lock	2023	5	—	—	5	0	0	0	—	—	—	—
IS	Emily Curtain	24	Halfback, Five-eighth	2021	3 6	5	R	14	1	1	6	—	—	—	—
–	Sophie Curtain	24	Hooker, Second-row	2023	15	R	R	15	0	0	0	—	—	—	—
–	Jocephy Daniels	—	Centre	2021	3	—	R	3	0	0	0	—	—	—	1
–	Monique Donovan	29	Wing, Centre	2023	15	R	E	15	8	0	32	—	—	—	3
–	Dominique du Toit	29	Wing	2024	1	2	—	3	1	0	4	—	—	—	—
–	Alanna Dummett	22	Wing, Centre	2023	4	—	—	4	2	0	8	—	—	—	—
–	Samantha Economos	32	Second-row	2020	3 10	—	—	13	0	0	0	2	—	—	—
–	Makayla Eli	24	Lock, Five-eighth	2025	—	3	—	3	0	0	0	—	—	2	—
–	Jade Etherden	31	Second-row	2020	1 2	—	—	3	0	0	0	—	—	—	—
–	Iemaima Etuale	20	Lock	2025	—	5	—	5	0	0	0	—	—	—	—
–	Estanoa Faitala-Mariner	21	Centre, Wing	2025	—	5	R	5	1	0	4	—	—	—	—
–	Jaida Faleono	20	Prop	2024	3	R	R	3	0	0	0	—	—	—	—
–	Ruby Fifita	25	Prop	2025	—	1	R	1	0	0	0	—	—	2	—
–	Claudia Finau	20	Prop	—	—	H	R	0	0	0	0	—	—	—	—
–	Tatiana Finau	22	Second-row	2024	1	8	R	9	0	0	0	—	—	2	—
–	Jessica Gentle	29	Wing, Centre	2022	1 2	—	—	3	2	0	8	1	—	—	—
–	Imogen Gobran	22	Prop	2023	4	—	—	4	0	0	0	—	—	—	—
–	Lavinia Gould	43	Hooker, Lock	2018	30	R	R	30	3	0	12	3	—	—	1
–	Alice Gregory	28	Wing	2024	5	2	—	7	0	0	0	—	—	—	—
–	Grace Griffin	35	Five-eighth	2021	4 2	R	R	6	0	0	0	—	—	—	—
–	Grace Hamilton	34	Prop	2020	10	R	—	10	0	0	0	—	—	—	—
–	Imogen Hei	20	Hooker	—	—	R	—	0	0	0	0	—	—	—	—
–	Kimberley Hunt	33	Wing, Centre	2023	7 4	R	R	11	10	0	40	—	—	—	1
–	Madeline Jones	29	Prop, Lock	2023	17	—	—	17	0	0	0	—	—	—	—
–	Shaylee Joseph	20	Second-row	—	—	R	R	0	0	0	0	—	—	—	—
–	Tommaya Kelly-Sines	31	Prop	2021	4 12	R	R	16	0	0	0	—	—	—	4
–	Jessica Kennedy	23	Prop	2023	8	R	R	8	0	0	0	—	—	1	—
–	Atasi Lafai	—	interchange	2023	—	RU	—	0	0	0	0	—	—	—	—
–	Sienna Laing	19	Wing	—	—	R	R	0	0	0	0	—	—	5	—
–	Hannah Larsson	23	Second-row	2022	3	—	—	3	0	0	0	—	—	—	—
–	Lauretta Leao-Seve	39	Prop	—	—	R	—	0	0	0	0	—	—	1	—
–	Tiresa Leasuasu	20	Lock	—	—	R	R	0	0	0	0	—	—	—	—
–	Tamerah Leati	22	Centre	—	—	R	—	0	0	0	0	—	—	1	—
–	Leki Leilua	18	Prop	2025	—	1	—	1	0	0	0	—	—	—	—
–	Josie Lenaz	26	Wing, Centre	2023	6	R	R	6	1	0	4	—	—	1	—
–	Petesa Lio	23	Wing	2023	2	—	—	2	0	0	0	—	—	1	—
–	Jayda Lofipo	24	Prop	—	—	R	R	0	0	0	0	—	—	—	—
–	Shellie Long	25	Second-row, Centre	2023	11	—	R	11	1	0	4	—	—	4	—
DV	Katie Madigan	—		—	—	—	—	0	0	0	0	—	—	—	—
–	Seli Mailangi	29	Hooker, Lock	2021	12	R	R	12	1	0	4	—	—	5	—
–	Chelsea Makira	21	Hooker	—	—	R	—	0	0	0	0	—	—	2	—
–	Taylor Mapusua	28	Wing, Centre	2021	2 2	R	R	4	2	0	8	1	—	1	—
–	Kerehitina Matua	26	Second-row, Prop	2023	16	4	—	20	2	0	8	—	—	7	4
–	Shaianne McGlone	32	Centre, Second-row	2024	6	R	R	6	0	0	0	—	—	—	—
–	Jamilee McGregor	28	Prop, Lock	2023	16	4	—	20	0	3	6	—	—	1	—
–	Mia Middleton	23	Centre, Wing	2023	4	2	R	6	0	0	0	—	—	—	1
–	Sareka Mooka	26	Centre	2023	12	R	R	12	1	0	4	—	—	6	1
–	Caitlin Moran	29	Five-eighth, Halfback	2022	7	—	—	7	0	0	0	2	2	6	4
–	Hagiga Mosby	26	Centre, Wing	2021	4 2	R	R	6	4	0	16	—	—	—	—
–	Roxy Murdoch-Masila	33	Prop, Second-row	2021	6 2 8	—	R	16	2	0	8	—	—	5	2
–	Shannon Muru	27	Second-row	2023	4	10	R	14	1	0	4	—	—	4	—
–	Vitalina Naikore	25	Wing	2023	11	RU	—	11	5	0	20	—	—	3	—
–	Aliti Namoce	28	Second-row, Prop	2019	3 5	—	R	8	0	0	0	—	—	2	—
–	Nicole Nathan	26	Centre	—	—	RU	RU	0	0	0	0	—	—	—	—
–	April Ngatupuna	23	Prop, Lock	2021	6 5	R	R	11	1	0	4	—	—	5	—
–	Claudia Nielsen	—	Wing, Centre	2024	2	1	R	3	1	0	4	—	—	—	—
–	Sarahcen Oliver	26	Centre	—	—	R	—	0	0	0	0	—	—	—	—
–	Narikah Orchard	31	Prop	—	—	R	R	0	0	0	0	—	—	—	—
–	Megan Pakulis	29	Second-row	2025	—	4	E	4	0	0	0	—	—	13	—
–	Kelsey Parkin	28	Hooker	2025	—	1	R	1	0	0	0	—	—	—	2
–	Jessica Patea	18	Centre, Fullback	—	—	R	R	0	0	0	0	—	—	5	—
–	Jae Patu	—	Lock, Prop	2023	2	R	R	2	0	0	0	—	—	—	—
–	Dannii Perese	22	Prop	2023	12	1	—	13	1	0	4	—	—	2	—
–	Kaitlyn Phillips	29	Second-row, Prop	2020	2 7 3	R	—	12	1	0	4	—	—	—	4
–	Paris Pickering	21	Centre	2025	—	2	—	2	0	0	0	—	—	—	—
–	Rebecca Pollard	27	Wing, Fullback	2023	10	7	—	17	6	0	24	—	—	1	—
–	Shaniah Power	29	Second-row	2020	2 6 5 10	E	R	23	6	0	24	—	4	—	4
–	Felice Quinlan	28	Centre	2024	5	R	R	5	1	0	4	—	—	—	—
–	Ua Ravu	29	Lock	2023	2	H	R	2	0	0	0	—	—	9	—
–	Jessikah Reeves	25	Prop	2023	5	3	R	8	0	0	0	—	—	10	—
–	Sarah Riordan	34	Centre, Five-eighth	2023	4	RU	RU	4	0	0	0	—	—	—	—
–	Savannah Roberts-Hickling	20	Centre	—	—	R	RU	0	0	0	0	—	—	—	—
–	Shannon Rose	29	Fullback, Wing	2022	1	—	—	1	0	0	0	—	—	—	—
–	Ella Ryan	23	Centre	2023	1	D	RU	1	0	0	0	—	—	—	—
–	Brooke Saddler	25	Fullback, Wing	—	—	R	—	0	0	0	0	—	—	—	—
–	Georgia Sim	27	Wing	2024	1	R	R	1	0	0	0	—	—	—	—
–	Kyra Simon	23	Lock, Prop	2021	4 3	R	R	7	0	0	0	1	—	—	1
–	Sharni Smale	38	Second-row, Centre	2024	4	—	—	4	0	0	0	—	—	—	—
–	Elise Smith	32	Second-row	2023	3	D	—	3	0	0	0	—	—	—	—
–	Tess Staines	24	Wing, Centre	2022	3 8	6	R	17	6	0	24	—	—	—	—
–	Anneka Stephens	36	Hooker	2018	3	RU	RU	3	0	0	0	—		5	—
–	Autumn-Rain Stephens-Daly	29	Wing, Five-eighth	2021	8 3	R	R	11	3	0	12	1	—	5	1
–	Shontelle Stowers	39	Second-row, Centre	2018	6 2 2 2	—	—	12	0	0	0	—	1	—	—
–	Maddie Studdon	31	Five-eighth, Halfback	2018	2 6 5 1	1	R	15	1	16	37	—	7	6	3
–	Malaela Sua	20	Prop	—	—	R	—	0	0	0	0	—	—	1	—
–	Libby Surha	22	Wing, Centre	2023	5	R	—	5	1	0	4	—	—	—	—
–	Kalyn Takitimu-Cook	26	Wing, Five-eighth	2025	—	2	—	2	0	0	0	—	—	—	—
–	Caitlin Tanner	20	Halfback	—	—	R	R	0	0	0	0	—	—	2	—
–	Pia Tapsell	27	Prop, Lock	2025	—	5	RU	5	0	0	0	—	—	—	—
–	Cortez Te Pou	25	Wing	2023	4	R	R	4	3	0	12	—	—	—	—
–	Georgia Thomas	28	Five-eighth, Halfback	2025	—	3	—	3	0	0	0	—	—	—	—
–	Tiana-Lee Thorne	18	Wing, Fullback	2024	3	1	R	4	1	0	4	—	—	—	—
–	Viena Tinao	23	Prop	2023	10	5	R	15	0	0	0	1	—	1	—
–	Paige Travis	26	Second-row, Lock	2025	—	11	E	11	0	0	0	—	—	9	—
–	Chantel Tugaga	24	Second-row, Lock	2021	3	R	—	3	0	0	0	—	—	—	—
–	Jazmon Tupou-Witchman	22	Prop	2023	2 1	R	R	3	0	0	0	—	—	7	—
DV	Uta Uatisone Poka	19	Second-row	—	—	R	—	0	0	0	0	—	—	—	—
–	Folau Vaki	23	Prop	2023	3	—	R	3	0	0	0	—	—	1	—
–	Adi Vani Buleki	25	Wing	2025	—	6	RU	6	1	0	4	—	—	—	—
–	Tia-Jordyn Vasilovski	21	Fullback	—	—	R	R	0	0	0	0	—	—	—	—
–	Lanulangi Veainu	32	Wing	2018	3	—	R	3	0	0	0	—		3 1	—
–	Ashleigh Werner	33	Wing	2023	7	—	—	7	2	0	8	—	—	—	—
–	Georgia Willey	21	Wing	2024	1	R	R	1	0	0	0	—	—	—	—
–	Janelle Williams	36	Prop, Second-row	2021	4	—	R	4	0	0	0	—	—	1	2
–	Niall Williams-Guthrie	38	Centre	2023	17	R	—	17	2	0	8	—	—	1	—
–	Ellie Williamson	22	Second-row	2023	1	E	E	1	1	0	4	—	—	—	—
–	Luisa Yaranamua	22	Five-eighth, Lock	—	—	R	R	0	0	0	0	—	—	4	—

Notes:

- In the above table, the 2025 column indicates, where applicable, the player's (reserve grade / second tier) team in the NSWRL Women's Premiership or QRL Women's Premiership.

== Unavailable players ==
The following off contract players were unavailable to play in the 2025 NRL Women's season or will be unavailable to play in the 2026 NRL Women's season, due to:

- an injury that requires a long-term recovery period
- illness
- pregnancy
- retirement

HN	Player	Age	Position(s)	NRLW seasons				NRLW stats					Origin	Tests	All Stars
HN	Player	Age	Position(s)	Debut	2018-24	2025	2026	M	T	G	Pts	Prems	Origin	Tests	All Stars
–	Tahlulah Tillett	27	Halfback, Five-eighth	2021	4 15	8	—	27	0	0	0	—	—	—	2
–	Vanessa Foliaki	32	Second-row	2018	11 7 20	—	—	38	2	0	8	—	6	6 2	1
–	Samantha Bremner	33	Fullback	2018	4 15	—	—	19	9	0	36	1	6	10	5
–	Karina Brown	36	Wing, Fullback	2018	7 3 22	—	—	32	3	0	12	—	9	11	5
–	Stephanie Hancock	43	Prop	2018	8 10 22	—	—	40	8	0	32	2	14	18	7
–	Mariah Denman	28	Lock, Second-row	2018	23	—	—	23	1	6	16	2	—	—	—
–	Renee Targett	31	Hooker	2021	15	—	—	15	0	0	0	—	—	2	—
–	Tazmin Rapana	30	Second-row, Lock	2018	4 21 3 4	—	—	32	7	0	28	1	12	1	1 2
–	Shakiah Tungai	28	Wing, Fullback	2018	8 2 16	—	—	26	11	6	56	—	1	1	3

== See also ==
- List of current NRL team squads
- List of current NRL Women's coaches
