= Mxolisi =

Mxolisi is a South African masculine given name. Notable people with the name include:

- Mxolisi Dimaza, South African politician and trade unionist
- Mxolisi Dukwana (born 1964), South African politician
- Mxolisi Kaunda (born 1972), South African politician
- Mxolisi Lukhele (born 1991), Swazi football player
- Mxolisi Macuphu (born 1989), South African footballer
- Mxolisi Mgojo, South African businessman
- Mxolisi Mthethwa (born 1978), Swazi football midfielder
- Mxolisi Sizo Nkosi (born 1967), South African government official
- Mxolisi Nxasana, Director of Public Prosecutions in South Africa
- Mxolisi Siyonzana, South African politician

== See also ==
- Mxolisa Sokatsha (1965–2022), South African politician
