= 2025 Women's Nkosi Cup =

Indoor hockey tournament in South Africa

Tournament details
- Host country: South Africa
- City: Cape Town
- Dates: 12–16 December
- Teams: 5 (from 2 confederations)
- Venue: Wynberg Military Base Stadium

Final positions
- Champions: South Africa (1st title)
- Runner-up: Australia
- Third place: Namibia

Tournament statistics
- Matches played: 14
- Goals scored: 110 (7.86 per match)
- Top scorer: (South Africa) Malikah Hamza (11 goals)
- Best player: (South Africa) Malikah Hamza
- Best goalkeeper: (Australia) Emma Leighton

The 2025 Nkosi Cup was the third edition of the Nkosi Cup, an annual invitational international women's indoor hockey tournament in South Africa. It was held at the Wynberg Military Base Stadium, Cape Town, South Africa from 12 to 16 December 2025.

South Africa won, defeating Australia in the final, 4–3.

== Teams ==
Australia
1. Brooke Welsh
3. Caitlin Burns
10. Ella White
12. Annelyse Tevant
15. Emma Scriven
16. Emma Leighton (GK)
17. Erin Burns
21. Jamie Zimmerman
24. Kaitlyn Lee
25. Kelsey Hughes
31. Tegan Neowhouse (GK)
34. Samantha Economos
Namibia
1. Petro Stoffberg (GK)
3. Azaylee Philander
4. Sunelle Ludwig (C)
5. Kiana-Che Cormack (C)
7. Danja Meyer
9. Jerrica Bartlett
11. Abigail Rowles
14. Ottilie Hinda
16. Amber Dercksen
17. Tamara Grögli
18. Sienna Richards
22. Leila Grögli
23. Alexandra Erasmus (GK)
25. Allison January
New Zealand
5. Pat Harris
8. Alexandre Beauduin
10. Alberto Montilla
13. Willem Pouw
24. Vincent Heller
26. Mohan Gandhi
30. Michael Mendoza
32. Mehtab Grewal
36. Doug Allison
44. Shomik Chakraborty (GK)
45. Jack Weitzman
77. Amar Singh (GK)
South Africa
2. Jamie Southgate (C)
5. Tatum Kroutz
6. Daniella de Oliveira
7. Edith Molikoe
10. Chelsey Woolf
11. Cerian Fourie
13. Ashleigh Thomas
15. Malikah Hamza
16. Jessica Lardant (C)
17. Laikén Brisset
20. Charlize Swanepoel (GK)
25. Sarah Paget (GK)
Zimbabwe
1. Tanatswa Mutaramuswa (GK)
2. Jenna Mathieson (GK)
3. Lylie Wilde
4. Sarah Evans
5. Roxanne Viviers
6. Alexei Terblanche
7. Simone Herbst
8. Natalie Terblanche
9. Athina Mujiba
10. Taya Trivella
11. Rumbidzai Zimuto
12. Iman Johnson

== Preliminary round ==
All times are local (All times are local (UTC+2)

Pos	Team	Pld	W	D	L	GF	GA	GD	Pts	Qualification
1	Australia	4	3	1	0	25	5	+20	10	Semi-final
2	South Africa (H)	4	3	0	1	25	8	+17	9	Semi-final
3	Namibia	4	2	1	1	19	12	+7	7	Semi-final
4	New Zealand	4	0	1	3	4	20	−16	1	Semi-final
5	Zimbabwe	4	0	1	3	5	33	−28	1	

Source: FIH
Rules for classification: 1) points; 2) matches won; 3) goal difference; 4) goals for; 5) head-to-head result; 6) field goals for.
(H) Hosts

12 December 2025
16:00

Namibia	6–3	Zimbabwe
Cormack 5'; Bartlett 12'; T. Grögli 13', 30'; L. Grögli 19'; Hinda 22'; Ludwig 40'	Report	A. Terblanche 32', 35'; Wilde 38'

Umpires:
Micaela Roos (RSA)
Amy Daniel (USA)

12 December 2025
18:40

South Africa	7–0	New Zealand
Fourie 6', 12'; Hamza 9'; Kroutz 23', 25'; De Oliveira 26', 36'	Report

Umpires:
Cassidy Gallagher (AUS)
Kelly Hudson (NZL)

13 December 2025
09:00

Australia	13–1	Zimbabwe
Tevant 1', 10', 36'; Economos 5'; Welsh 8'; Hughes 10', 10'; White 15'; Lee 21', 21'; C. Burns 22', 37'; E. Burns 30'	Report	Viviers 16'

Umpires:
Fenestha Pienaar (NAM)
Micaela Roos (RSA)

13 December 2025
11:40

Namibia	7–3	New Zealand
Ludwig 2', 33', 39'; T. Grögli 14'; January 17'; Cormack 30', 34'	Report	Mclean 6'; Brun 9', 14'

Umpires:
Sharne Mayers (ZIM)
Cassidy Gallagher (AUS)

13 December 2025
16:00

New Zealand	1–1	Zimbabwe
Roxborough-Judd 37'	Report	A. Terblanche 40'

Umpires:
Fenestha Pienaar (NAM)
Cassidy Gallagher (AUS)

13 December 2025
18:40

South Africa	2–5	Australia
Kroutz 7'; Hamza 39'	Report	Hughes 8'; Lee 11'; C. Burns 18'; White 22'; Zimmerman 30'

Umpires:
Amy Daniel (USA)
Sharne Mayers (ZIM)

14 December 2025
15:00

Namibia	2–2	Australia
Cormack 25'; Dercksen 40'	Report	Welsh 11'; C. Burns 15'

Umpires:
Micaela Roos (RSA)
Sharne Mayers (ZIM)

14 December 2025
17:40

South Africa	12–0	Zimbabwe
Thomas 1'; Lardant 3', 10'; Hamza 4', 6', 30'; Woolf 13'; De Oliveira 26', 32'; Fourie 31'; Kroutz 38', 38'	Report

Umpires:
Amy Daniel (USA)
Cassidy Gallagher (AUS)

15 December 2025
09:00

Australia	5–0	New Zealand
Economos 9'; Lee 10'; C. Burns 21', 22'; Tevant 37'	Report

Umpires:
Sharne Mayers (ZIM)
Amy Daniel (USA)

15 December 2025
11:40

South Africa	4–3	Namibia
Hamza 22', 23', 24'; Woolf 28'	Report	T. Grögli 29'; Hinda 35'; L. Grögli 39'

Umpires:
Rachel Williams (ENG)
Kelly Hudson (NZL)

=== Medal round ===
==== Bracket ====
Semi-finals
15 December
Australia	7
New Zealand	3
15 December
South Africa	5
Namibia	3

Final
16 December
Australia	3
South Africa	4
Third place
16 December
New Zealand	1
Namibia	6

==== Semi-finals ====
15 December 2025
16:00

Australia	7–3	New Zealand
Welsh 4'; Lee 6', 20'; Tevant 15', 28'; C. Burns 33'; Scriven 35'	Report	Roxborough-Judd 2'; Buchanan 3'; McLean 33'

Umpires:
Siyabonga Martins (NAM)
Micaela Roos (RSA)

15 December 2025
18:40

South Africa	5–3	Namibia
Hamza 14', 40'; Fourie 16'; Thomas 18'; Lardant 21'	Report	Cormack 1'; Dercksen 17'; Meyer 24'

Umpires:
Kelly Hudson (NZL)
Cassidy Gallagher (AUS)

==== Third and fourth place ====
16 December 2025
16:00

Namibia	6–1	New Zealand
T. Grögli 6', 28'; Bartlett 7', 14'; Cormack 22'; Meyer 25'	Report	Brun 16'

Umpires:
Amy Daniel (USA)
Cassidy Gallagher (AUS)

==== Final ====
16 December 2025
18:40

Australia	3–4	South Africa
Lee 4'; Scriven 19'; Tevant 40'	Report	Molikoe 2'; Kroutz 3'; Hamza 25'; Fourie 37'

Umpires:
Kelly Hudson (NZL)
Siyabonga Martins (NAM)

== Statistics ==
=== Final standings ===
Pos	Team
1st place, gold medalist(s)	South Africa (H)
2nd place, silver medalist(s)	Australia
3rd place, bronze medalist(s)	Namibia
4	New Zealand
5	Zimbabwe

Source: FIH
(H) Host

=== Goalscorers ===
There were 110 goals scored in 14 matches, for an average of 7.86 goals per match.

11 goals

- (South Africa) Malikah Hamza

7 goals

- (Australia) Caitlin Burns
- (Australia) Kaitlyn Lee
- (Australia) Annelyse Tevant

6 goals

- (Namibia) Kiana-Che Cormack
- (Namibia) Tamara Grögli
- (South Africa) Tatum Kroutz

5 goals

- (South Africa) Cerian Fourie

4 goals

- (Namibia) Sunelle Ludwig
- (South Africa) Daniella de Oliveira
- (Zimbabwe) Alexei Terblanche

3 goals

- (Australia) Kelsey Hughes
- (Australia) Brooke Welsh
- (Namibia) Jerrica Bartlett
- (New Zealand) Emily Brun
- (South Africa) Jessica Lardant

2 goals

- (Australia) Samantha Economos
- (Australia) Emma Scriven
- (Australia) Ella White
- (Namibia) Amber Dercksen
- (Namibia) Leila Grögli
- (Namibia) Ottilie Hinda
- (Namibia) Danja Meyer
- (New Zealand) Anna McLean
- (New Zealand) Eliza Roxborough-Judd
- (South Africa) Ashleigh Thomas
- (South Africa) Chelsey Woolf

1 goal

- (Australia) Erin Burns
- (Australia) Jamie Zimmerman
- (Namibia) Allison January
- (New Zealand) Tegan Buchanan
- (South Africa) Edith Molikoe
- (Zimbabwe) Roxanne Viviers

Source: FIH

== See also ==
- 2025 Men's Nkosi Cup
