= List of Newcastle Knights coaches =

There have been 13 coaches of the Newcastle Knights since their first season in 1988.

== List of coaches ==
No.	Name	Seasons	Games	Wins	Losses	Draws	Winning Percentage	Premiers	Wooden spoons
1	Allan McMahon	1988−1991	81	33	42	6	40.7%	—N/a	—N/a
2	David Waite	1991−1994	76	34	40	2	44.7%	—N/a	—N/a
3	Mal Reilly	1995−1998	98	62	33	2	63.3%	1997	—N/a
4	Warren Ryan	1999−2000	53	30	21	2	56.6%	—N/a	—N/a
5	Michael Hagan	2001−2006	155	83	71	1	53.5%	2001	2005
6	Brian Smith	2007−2009	68	31	37	0	45.6%	—N/a	—N/a
7	Rick Stone	2009−2011, 2015	72	31	41	0	43.1%	—N/a	—N/a
8	Wayne Bennett	2012−2014	75	34	40	1	45.3%	—N/a	—N/a
9	Danny Buderus	2015	6	2	4	0	33.3%	—N/a	2015
10	Nathan Brown	2016−2019	94	24	69	1	25.5%	—N/a	2016, 2017
11	Kristian Woolf	2019	2	1	1	0	50.0%	—N/a	—N/a
12	Adam O'Brien	2020−2025	145	62	81	2	42.8%	—N/a	2025
13	Justin Holbrook	2026-Present	11	7	4	0	63.7%	—N/a	—N/a

== See also ==
- List of current NRL coaches
- List of current NRL Women's coaches
