= Daniella de Oliveira =

South African field hockey player

Personal information
- Full name: Daniella Mendes de Oliveira
- Born: 11 July 2003 (age 23) Durban, South Africa

Sport
- Sport: Field hockey
- Position: Forward
Senior career
| Years | Team | Caps | Goals |
| –2022 | KZN Raiders | - | - |
| 2022– | Western Province | - | - |
National team
| Years | Team | Caps | Goals |
| 2023–2024 | South Africa U–21 | 10 | (0) |
| 2026– | South Africa | 7 | (1) |
Medal record
Representing South Africa
Women's field hockey
Junior Africa Cup
| Gold medal – first place | 2023 Ismalia |
Women's indoor hockey
Indoor Africa Cup
| Silver medal – second place | 2021 Durban |
Nkosi Cup
| Gold medal – first place | 2025 Cape Town |
| Silver medal – second place | 2023 Cape Town |
| Silver medal – second place | 2024 Cape Town |

Daniella Mendes de Oliveira (born 11 July 2003) is an international field and indoor hockey player from South Africa.

== Personal life ==
De Oliveira grew up in Durban, South Africa.

She is a former student of St. Mary's Diocesan School for Girls, and currently studies at Stellenbosch University.

== Field hockey ==
=== Domestic competition ===
In domestic competitions hosted by the South African Hockey Association, De Oliveira competes for Western Province. She also competes for the SU Maties.

=== International ===
==== Under–21 ====
De Oliveira made her international debut at under–21 level. She was a member of the gold medal-winning squad at the 2023 Junior Africa Cup in Ismalia. Later that year she represented the team again at the FIH Junior World Cup in Santiago, where the team finished thirteenth.

==== Senior team ====
She made her senior international debut in 2025, when she was named in the squad for the 2024–25 FIH Nations Cup 2 in Wałcz.

In 2026 she was named in the national squad ahead of the FIH World Cup.

== Indoor hockey ==
Prior to making her senior debut in field hockey, De Oliveira was a member of the national indoor team. During her career, she has appeared at the 2023 and 2025 editions of the FIH Indoor World Cup, held in Pretoria and Poreč, respectively. She also won silver at the 2021 Indoor Africa Cup in Durban, and has competed in every edition of the Nkosi Cup.

In 2024 she was named Indoor Player of the Year by the South African Hockey Association.
