= 2025 Men's Nkosi Cup =

Indoor hockey tournament

Tournament details
- Host country: South Africa
- City: Cape Town
- Dates: 12–16 December
- Teams: 5 (from 3 confederations)
- Venue: Wynberg Military Base Stadium

Final positions
- Champions: South Africa (3rd title)
- Runner-up: Australia
- Third place: New Zealand

Tournament statistics
- Matches played: 14
- Goals scored: 117 (8.36 per match)
- Top scorer: (South Africa) Mustapha Cassiem (21 goals)
- Best player: (South Africa) Mustapha Cassiem
- Best goalkeeper: (New Zealand) Max Ruffell

The 2025 Nkosi Cup was the third edition of the Nkosi Cup, an annual invitational international men's indoor hockey tournament in South Africa. It was held at the Wynberg Military Base Stadium, Cape Town, South Africa from 12 to 16 December 2025.

South Africa won the tournament for a record three time after defeating Australia in the final, 10–4.

== Teams ==
Australia
1. Aiden Dooley
2. Luke Randle
3. Brendan Hill (GK)
5. Ryan Pace
10. Garry Backhus
14. Jake Staines (C)
16. Jett Leong
18. Benjamin Rennie (GK)
19. Mitchell Pace
23. Scott Govers
25. Tim Deavin
30. Connor Tuddenham
Namibia
1. David Strauss (C, GK)
2. Richter van Rooyen (GK)
3. Roben Kambinda (GK)
3. Giovane Handura
11. Percy Barthram
13. Pieter Jacobs (C)
14. Matukaramove Kavikairiua
16. Jack Fourie
17. Dylan Finch
18. Delron Handura
22. Enzo Martins
27. Mathew Lassen
30. Shayan Azadeh
33. Daniël Janse van Rensburg
42. Jadon Mcnally
44. Ludwig van Rooyen
New Zealand
1. Max Ruffell (GK)
2. Luka Clark
3. Stephen Atkinson
4. Benedict van Woerkom
5. David Green (C)
6. Brennan Alexander-Parker
7. Matthew Symonds
8. Durant Joshua
12. Daniel Scanlon
13. Jarryd Russell
14. Robert Tohu
19. Angus Griffin (GK)
South Africa
2. Mustapha Cassiem
6. Hans Neethling
7. Dayaan Cassiem (C)
10. Keegan Hezlett
12. Marvin Simons
16. Dalpiarro Langford
19. Ryan Julius
21. Jethro Eustice
22. Travis Krumples
23. Bongumusa Mngoma (GK)
25. Leruo Ditlhakanyane
30. Cullin de Jager (GK)
United States
5. Patrick Harris
8. Alexandre Beauduin
10. Alberto Montilla
13. Willem Pouw
24. Vincent Heller
26. Mohan Gandhi
30. Michael Mendoza
32. Mehtab Grewal
36. Doug Allison
44. Shomik Chakraborty (GK)
45. Jack Weitzman
77. Amar Singh (GK)

== Preliminary round ==
All times are local (All times are local (UTC+2)

Pos	Team	Pld	W	D	L	GF	GA	GD	Pts	Qualification
1	South Africa (H)	4	4	0	0	23	9	+14	12	Semi-final
2	Australia	4	2	0	2	21	16	+5	6	Semi-final
3	Namibia	4	2	0	2	20	20	0	6	Semi-final
4	New Zealand	4	2	0	2	11	16	−5	6	Semi-final
5	United States	4	0	0	4	12	26	−14	0	

Updated to match(es) played on 15 December 2025. Source: FIH
Rules for classification: 1) points; 2) matches won; 3) goal difference; 4) goals for; 5) head-to-head result; 6) field goals for.
(H) Hosts

12 December 2025
17:20

Namibia	6–5	United States
Finch 2', 35'; Jacobs 15', 38'; Azadeh 27'; Handura 35'	Report	Beauduin 18'; Montilla 23', 33', 39'; Harris 35'

Umpires:
Chad Fourie (RSA)
Isaac Charles (ENG)

12 December 2025
20:00

South Africa	5–1	New Zealand
M. Cassiem 1', 9'; D. Cassiem 3'; Neethling 15'; Simons 23'	Report	Symonds 19'

Umpires:
Rachel Williams (ENG)
Jayden Pearson (AUS)

13 December 2025
10:20

Australia	3–4	New Zealand
Dooley 3', 8', 40'	Report	Clark 7'; Scanlon 29'; Durant 36'; Van Woerkom 36'

Umpires:
Rachel Williams (ENG)
Isaac Charles (ENG)

13 December 2025
13:00

South Africa	6–1	United States
M. Cassiem 2', 25', 27', 37', 39'; Neethling 18'	Report	Harris 23'

Umpires:
Siyabonga Martins (NAM)
Kelly Hudson (NZL)

13 December 2025
17:20

United States	2–3	New Zealand
Weitzman 16'; Beauduin 17'	Report	Durant 5'; Clark 15'; Van Woerkom 38'

Umpires:
Siyabonga Martins (NAM)
Jayden Pearson (AUS)

13 December 2025
20:00

Namibia	3–5	Australia
Finch 15', 25'; Jacobs 38'	Report	Dooley 10', 14', 23', 30', 35'

Umpires:
Chad Fourie (RSA)
Kelly Hudson (NZL)

14 December 2025
16:20

Namibia	6–3	New Zealand
Azadeh 2'; Finch 8', 39'; Handura 32'; Jacobs 33', 36'	Report	Van Woerkom 3'; Clark 8', 13'

Umpires:
Rachel Williams (ENG)
Jayden Pearson (AUS)

14 December 2025
19:00

South Africa	5–2	Australia
M. Cassiem 9', 9', 24', 33', 38'	Report	Dooley 20'; Randle 33'

Umpires:
Isaac Charles (ENG)
Siyabonga Martins (NAM)

15 December 2025
10:20

Australia	11–4	United States
J. Staines 1', 15'; Dooley 14', 15'; Leong 18'; Deavin 24'; Pace 28', 36'; Tuddenham 33', 39'; Govers 33'	Report	Harris 13'; Pouw 22'; Beauduin 40', 40'

Umpires:
Siyabonga Martins (NAM)
Chad Fourie (RSA)

15 December 2025
13:00

South Africa	7–4	Namibia
M. Cassiem 2', 17', 33'; Langford 9', 21'; Neethling 17'; D. Cassiem 39'	Report	Van Rooyen 7', 33', 38'; Finch 24'; Handura 39'

Umpires:
Jayden Pearson (AUS)
Isaac Charles (ENG)

=== Medal round ===
==== Bracket ====
Semi-finals
15 December
Australia	5
Namibia	1
15 December
South Africa	4
New Zealand	1

Final
16 December
Australia	4
South Africa	10
Third place
16 December
Namibia	2
New Zealand	3

==== Semi-finals ====
15 December 2025
17:20

Australia	5–1	Namibia
J. Staines 22'; Dooley 24', 39', 40'; Govers 25'	Report	Jacobs 17'

Umpires:
Jayden Pearson (AUS)
Chad Fourie (RSA)

15 December 2025
20:00

South Africa	4–1	New Zealand
Simons 7'; M. Cassiem 18'; Julius 25'; Neethling 28'	Report	Atkinson 26'

Umpires:
Rachel Williams (ENG)
Isaac Charles (ENG)

==== Third and fourth place ====
16 December 2025
17:20

Namibia	2–3	New Zealand
Finch 35'; Van Rooyen 37'	Report	Atkinson 10'; Clark 28', 37'

Umpires:
Jayden Pearson (AUS)
Chad Fourie (RSA)

==== Final ====
16 December 2025
20:00

South Africa	10–4	Australia
M. Cassiem 1', 4', 7', 17', 37'; D. Cassiem 2', 28', 37'; Julius 7'; Hezlett 32'	Report	Pace 5'; Dooley 9', 36'; Govers 13'

Umpires:
Rachel Williams (ENG)
Isaac Charles (ENG)

== Statistics ==
=== Final standings ===
Pos	Team
1st place, gold medalist(s)	South Africa (H)
2nd place, silver medalist(s)	Australia
3rd place, bronze medalist(s)	New Zealand
4	Namibia
5	United States

Source: FIH
(H) Host

=== Goalscorers ===
There were 117 goals scored in 14 matches, for an average of 8.36 goals per match.

21 goals

- (South Africa) Mustapha Cassiem

16 goals

- (Australia) Aiden Dooley

8 goals

- (Namibia) Dylan Finch

6 goals

- (Namibia) Pieter Jacobs
- (New Zealand) Luka Clark

5 goals

- (South Africa) Dayaan Cassiem

4 goals

- (Namibia) Ludwig van Rooyen
- (South Africa) Hans Neethling
- (United States) Alexandre Beauduin

3 goals

- (Australia) Scott Govers
- (Australia) Ryan Pace
- (Australia) Jake Staines
- (Namibia) Delron Handura
- (New Zealand) Benedict van Woerkom
- (United States) Patrick Harris
- (United States) Alberto Montilla

2 goals

- (Australia) Connor Tuddenham
- (Namibia) Shayan Azadeh
- (New Zealand) Stephen Atkinson
- (New Zealand) Joshua Durant
- (South Africa) Ryan Julius
- (South Africa) Dalpiarro Langford
- (South Africa) Marvin Simons

1 goal

- (Australia) Tim Deavin
- (Australia) Jett Leong
- (Australia) Luke Randle
- (New Zealand) Daniel Scanlon
- (New Zealand) Matthew Symonds
- (South Africa) Keegan Hezlett
- (United States) Willem Pouw
- (United States) Jack Weitzman

Source: FIH

== See also ==
- 2025 Women's Nkosi Cup
