= 2024 Women's Oceania Indoor World Cup qualifier =

Tournament details
- Host country: Australia
- City: Canberra
- Dates: 24–26 June
- Teams: 2 (from 1 confederation)
- Venue: National Hockey Centre

Final positions
- Champions: Australia
- Runner-up: New Zealand

Tournament statistics
- Matches played: 3
- Goals scored: 13 (4.33 per match)
- Top scorer: (Australia) Jamie Zimmerman (3 goals)

The 2024 Women's Oceania Indoor World Cup qualifier was a three-game series between Australia and New Zealand to determine the Oceanian participant of the 2025 Women's FIH Indoor Hockey World Cup. The tournament was held at the National Hockey Centre in Canberra, Australia from 24 to 26 June 2024.

Australia won the series by winning one and drawing two of the three matches which means they qualified for their seventh Women's FIH Indoor Hockey World Cup in a row.

== Standings ==
Pos	Team	Pld	W	D	L	GF	GA	GD	Pts	Qualification
1	Australia (H)	3	1	2	0	7	6	+1	5	2025 Indoor Hockey World Cup
2	New Zealand	3	0	2	1	6	7	−1	2	

Source: FIH
Rules for classification: 1) points; 2) matches won; 3) goal difference; 4) goals for; 5) head-to-head result; 6) field goals for.
(H) Hosts

== Results ==
All times are local (UTC+10).

24 June 2024
19:30

Australia	1–0	New Zealand
Hughes 34'	Report

Umpires:
Kelly Hudson (NZL)
Emily Carroll (AUS)

25 June 2024
18:00

Australia	3–3	New Zealand
Thomson 17'; Field 22'; Zimmerman 25'	Report	Hepi 22'; Pearce 29'; Sheild 33'

Umpires:
Kristy Robertson (NZL)
Emily Carroll (AUS)

26 June 2024
19:30

Australia	3–3	New Zealand
Zimmerman 12', 24'; Scriven 35'	Report	Hildesley 6', 36'; Sheild 19'

Umpires:
Kristy Robertson (NZL)
Kelly Hudson (NZL)

== Goalscorers ==
There were 13 goals scored in 3 matches, for an average of 4.33 goals per match.

3 goals

- (Australia) Jamie Zimmerman

2 goals

- (New Zealand) Sophie Hildesley
- (New Zealand) Arabella Sheild

1 goal

- (Australia) Litiana Field
- (Australia) Kelsey Hughes
- (Australia) Taylor Thomson
- (Australia) Emma Scriven
- (New Zealand) Oriwa Hepi
- (New Zealand) Kirsten Pearce

Source: FIH

== See also ==
- 2024 Men's Oceania Indoor World Cup qualifier
