= 2024 Women's Nkosi Cup =

Indoor hockey tournament

Tournament details
- Host country: South Africa
- City: Cape Town
- Dates: 13 December 2024–17 December 2024
- Teams: 3 (from 2 confederations)
- Venue: Wynberg Military Base Stadium

Final positions
- Champions: Namibia (2nd title)
- Runner-up: Namibia
- Third place: Ireland

Tournament statistics
- Matches played: 7
- Goals scored: 42 (6 per match)
- Top scorer: (Namibia) Kiana-Che Cormack (5 goals)
- Best goalkeeper: (Namibia) Petro Stoffberg

The 2024 Nkosi Cup was the second edition of the Nkosi Cup, an annual invitational international women's indoor hockey tournament in South Africa. It was held in Wynberg Military Base Stadium, Cape Town, South Africa from 13 to 17 December 2024.

Namibia were the defending champions, beating South Africa in the final, 3–1.

== Teams ==
Ireland
1. Emma Buckley (GK)
2. Caoimhe Seymour (GK)
3. Sarah Patton
4. Laura Graham
5. Caroline Spence
6. Ellen Robinson
7. Chloe Brown
8. Christine Seggie
9. Orla Fox
10. Orla Patton (C)
11. Milla Fulton
12. Jenna McCarlie
Namibia
1. Petro Stoffberg (GK)
3. Azaylee Philander
4. Sunelle Ludwig (C)
5. Kiana-Che Cormack
7. Danja Meyer
8. Jivanka Kruger
9. Jerrica Bartlett
10. Jaime Henckert (GK)
15. Jahntwa Kruger
16. Amber Dercksen
19. Taramarie Myburgh
South Africa
2. Jamie Southgate (C)
6. Daniella de Oliveira
7. Edith Molikoe
8. Cailynn den Bakker
9. Kayla de Waal
14. Tegan Fourie
15. Malikah Hamza
16. Jessica Lardant
17. Laikén Brisset
23. Cheree Greyvenstein (GK)
25. Sarah Paget (GK)
29. Laylaa Davids

== Preliminary round ==
All times are local (All times are local (UTC+2)

Pos	Team	Pld	W	D	L	GF	GA	GD	Pts	Qualification
1	South Africa (H)	4	3	0	1	14	7	+7	9	Final
2	Namibia	4	2	1	1	13	12	+1	7	Final
3	Ireland	4	0	1	3	11	19	−8	1	

Source: FIH
Rules for classification: 1) points; 2) matches won; 3) goal difference; 4) goals for; 5) head-to-head result; 6) field goals for.
(H) Hosts

13 December 2024
18:30

Ireland	2–6	South Africa
C. Spence 3'; Brown 38'	Report	T. Fourie 1'; De Waal 12'; Hamza 21', 33', 35'; Davids 29'

Umpires:
Munashe Mashoko (ZIM)
Micaela Roos (RSA)

14 December 2024
12:45

Namibia	2–1	South Africa
Myburgh 3'; Cormack 20'	Report	Molikoe 39'

Umpires:
Ellie Duffy (IRL)
Munashe Mashoko (ZIM)

14 December 2024
18:30

Ireland	5–6	Namibia
S. Patton 4', 35'; C. Spence 15', 40'; Fox 24'	Report	Neethling 6'; Myburgh 7'; Philander 10', 38'; Cormack 11', 29'

Umpires:
Micaela Roos (RSA)
Irene Handura (NAM)

15 December 2024
17:30

South Africa	4–1	Ireland
T. Fourie 16'; De Waal 36'; Den Bakker 37', 38'	Report	Fox 12'

Umpires:
Micaela Roos (RSA)
Ellie Duffy (IRL)

16 December 2024
12:45

Namibia	3–3	Ireland
Cormack 5'; Myburgh 33'; Philander 38'	Report	C. Spence 8'; Brown 9'; Robinson 11'

Umpires:
Ellie Duffy (IRL)
Irene Handura (NAM

16 December 2024
19:45

South Africa	3–2	Namibia
T. Fourie 7', 27'; Molikoe 17'	Report	Kruger 16'; Philander 24'

Umpires:
Micaela Roos (RSA)
Munashe Mashoko (ZIM)

=== Final ===
17 December 2024
18:30

South Africa	1–3	Namibia
Hamza 37'	Report	Kruger 6', 40'; Cormack 31'

Umpires:
Munashe Mashoko (ZIM)
Ellie Duffy (IRL)

== Statistics ==
=== Final standings ===
Pos	Team
1st place, gold medalist(s)	Namibia
2nd place, silver medalist(s)	South Africa (H)
3rd place, bronze medalist(s)	Ireland

Source: FIH
(H) Host

=== Goalscorers ===
There were 42 goals scored in 7 matches, for an average of 6 goals per match.

5 goals

- (Namibia) Kiana-Che Cormack

4 goals

- (Ireland) Caroline Spence
- (Namibia) Azaylee Philander
- (South Africa) Tegan Fourie
- (South Africa) Malikah Hamza

3 goals

- (Namibia) Jivanka Kruger
- (Namibia) Taramarie Myburgh

2 goals

- (Ireland) Chloe Brown
- (Ireland) Orla Fox
- (Ireland) Sarah Patton
- (South Africa) Edith Molikoe
- (South Africa) Kayla de Waal
- (South Africa) Cailynn den Bakker

1 goal

- (Ireland) Ellen Robinson
- (Namibia) Marika Neethling
- (South Africa) Laylaa Davids

Source: FIH

== See also ==
- 2024 Men's Nkosi Cup
