= 2023 Women's Nkosi Cup =

Women's Nkosi Cup
Tournament details
- Host country: South Africa
- City: Cape Town
- Dates: 15–18 December
- Teams: 3
- Venue: Wynberg Military Base Stadium

Final positions
- Champions: Namibia (1st title)
- Runner-up: South Africa
- Third place: Ireland

Tournament statistics
- Matches played: 7
- Goals scored: 42 (6 per match)
- Top scorer: (Namibia) Kiana-Che Cormack (12 goals)

The Nkosi Cup was the inaugural of the Nkosi Cup from 15 to 19 December 2023. Hosted at the Wynberg Military Base Stadium.

Namibia were the inaugural World Cup winners, beating South Africa in the final, 4–2.

== Teams ==
Ireland
1. Emma Buckley (GK)
2. Kate O'Hogan (GK)
3. Sarah Patton
4. Laura Graham
5. Mikayla Power
7. Chloe Brown
9. Orla Fox
10. Orla Patton (C)
11. Milla Fulton
12. Jenna McCarlie
13. Lily Lloyd
14. Katie Kimber
Namibia
1. Petro Stoffberg (GK)
2. Jocelle Wessels
3. Azaylee Philander
4. Sunelle Ludwig
5. Kiana-Che Cormack
8. Marcia Venter
9. Jerrica Bartlett
10. Jaime Henckert (GK)
12. Gillian Hermanus (C)
16. Amber Dercksen
19. Taramarie Myburgh
South Africa
2. Jamie Southgate (C)
4. Kelsey Swanepoel
6. Daniella de Oliveira
7. Edith Molikoe
8. Cailynn den Bakker
9. Kayla de Waal
14. Tegan Fourie
15. Malikah Hamza
16. Jessica Lardant
17. Laikén Brisset
23. Cheree Greyvenstein (GK)
25. Sarah Paget (GK)
27. Bonolo Moabi
29. Laylaa Davids

== Preliminary round ==
All times are local (All times are local (UTC+2).).

Pos	Team	Pld	W	D	L	GF	GA	GD	Pts	Qualification
1	South Africa	4	4	0	0	15	10	+5	12	Final
2	Namibia	4	2	0	2	10	10	0	6	Final
3	Ireland (E)	4	0	0	4	11	16	−5	0	

Source: FIH
Rules for classification: 1) points; 2) matches won; 3) goal difference; 4) goals for; 5) head-to-head result; 6) field goals for.
(E) Eliminated

15 December 2023
20:00

Ireland	4–5	South Africa
Power 21'; Graham 29'; Brown 36'; McCarlie 36'	Report	Den Bakker 10', 27'; Molikoe 12'; Moabi 13'; Lardant 19'

16 December 2023
12:00

Namibia	5–3	Ireland
Cormack 10', 12', 14', 25'; Philander 40'	Report	S. Patton 11'; O. Patton 28'; Power 32'

16 December 2023
18:45

South Africa	3–1	Namibia
De Waal 5', 40'; De Oliveira 25'	Report	Cormack 7'

17 December 2023
18:30

Ireland	3–4	South Africa
S Patton 4'; Brown 21'; Fulton 23'	Report	Molikoe 7', 16', 19', 40'

18 December 2023
11:00

Namibia	2–1	Ireland
Cormack 15', 32'	Report	Lloyd 6'

18 December 2023
18:45

South Africa	3–2	Namibia
Fourie 19'; De Waal 23'; Hamza 34'	Report	Cormack 36', 37'

=== Final ===
19 December 2023
18:45

South Africa	2–4	Namibia
Hamza 6'; Den Bakker 27'	Report	Hermanus 1'; Cormack 3', 30', 34'

== Statistics ==
=== Final standings ===
Pos	Team
1	Namibia
2	South Africa (H)
3	Ireland

Source: FIH
(H) Host

=== Goalscorers ===
There were 42 goals scored in 7 matches, for an average of 6 goals per match.

12 goals

- (Namibia) Kiana-Che Cormack

5 goals

- (South Africa) Edith Molikoe

3 goals

- (South Africa) Kayla de Waal
- (South Africa) Cailynn den Bakker

2 goals

- (Ireland) Chloe Brown
- (Ireland) Sarah Patton
- (Ireland) Mikayla Power
- (South Africa) Malikah Hamza

1 goal

- (Ireland) Milla Fulton
- (Ireland) Laura Graham
- (Ireland) Lily Lloyd
- (Ireland) Jenna McCarlie
- (Ireland) Orla Patton
- (Namibia) Gillian Hermanus
- (Namibia) Azaylee Philander
- (South Africa) Daniella de Oliveira
- (South Africa) Tegan Fourie
- (South Africa) Jessica Lardant
- (South Africa) Bonolo Moabi

Source: FIH
