= Aiden Dooley =

Australian field hockey player (born 2004)

Personal information
- Full name: Aiden James Dooley
- Born: 7 July 2003 (age 23) Canberra, Australia

Sport
- Sport: Field hockey
- Position: Forward
Senior career
| Years | Team | Caps | Goals |
| 2022– | Canberra Chill | 30 | 18 |
National team
| Years | Team | Caps | Goals |
| 2024– | Australia Indoor | 15 | (26) |
Medal record
Representing Australia
Men's indoor hockey
Indoor Oceania Cup
| Gold medal – first place | 2024 Canberra |
Nkosi Cup
| Silver medal – second place | 2025 Cape Town |

Aiden James Dooley (born 7 July 2003) is an international field and indoor hockey player from Australia.

He competes in Hockey Australia's premier domestic competition, the ONE Active Hockey One.

== Personal life ==
Dooley was born in Canberra, Australian Capital Territory.

== Australian leagues ==
He currently competes in the Capital League 1 in his hometown, Canberra. In the league, he represents Central HC. In 2025 he also represented the University of NSW men's team in the Sydney Hockey League.

Since 2022, Dooley has been a member of the Canberra Chill men's team in the ONE Active Hockey One League. During his Hockey One career Dooley has been a prominent striker for the Chill, becoming top goalscorer during the team's silver medal performance in the fourth season.

== National teams ==
=== Under–21 ===
While he never made his debut for the Australian U–21 side, the Burras, Dooley was named as a member of the squad in 2023 and as a non-travelling reserve for the FIH Junior World Cup in Kuala Lumpur.

=== Indoor ===
He has also been a member of the Australian Indoor team since 2024. During his time with the squad, he has appeared at the 2024 Indoor Oceania Cup in Canberra, the 2025 FIH Indoor World Cup in Poreč, and the 2025 Nkosi Cup in Cape Town.

== Career statistics ==
Appearances and goals by club, season and competition
| Club | Season | League | | | Other | | Total | |
| Club | Season | Division | Apps | Goals | Apps | Goals | Apps | Goals |
|---|---|---|---|---|---|---|---|---|
| Canberra Chill | 2022 | ONE Active Hockey One | 8 | 5 | 2 | 0 | 10 | 5 |
| Canberra Chill | 2023 | ONE Active Hockey One | 4 | 0 | — | | 4 | 0 |
| Canberra Chill | 2024 | ONE Active Hockey One | 8 | 7 | — | | 8 | 7 |
| Canberra Chill | 2025 | ONE Active Hockey One | 5 | 5 | — | | 5 | 5 |
| Canberra Chill | 2026 | ONE Active Hockey One | 3 | 1 | — | | 3 | 1 |
| Canberra Chill | Total | | 28 | 18 | 2 | 0 | 30 | 18 |
| Career total | | | 28 | 18 | 2 | 0 | 30 | 18 |
