= 2024 Men's Oceania Indoor World Cup qualifier =

Tournament details
- Host country: Australia
- City: Canberra
- Dates: 24–26 June
- Teams: 2 (from 1 confederation)
- Venue: National Hockey Centre

Final positions
- Champions: Australia
- Runner-up: New Zealand

Tournament statistics
- Matches played: 3
- Goals scored: 19 (6.33 per match)
- Top scorer: (New Zealand) Tim Greenwood (4 goals)

The 2024 Men's Oceania Indoor World Cup qualifier was a three-game series between Australia and New Zealand to determine the Oceanian participant of the 2025 Men's FIH Indoor Hockey World Cup. The tournament was held at the National Hockey Centre in Canberra, Australia from 24 to 26 June 2024.

Australia won the series by winning two of the three matches which means they qualified for their seventh Men's FIH Indoor Hockey World Cup in a row.

== Standings ==
Pos	Team	Pld	W	D	L	GF	GA	GD	Pts	Qualification
1	Australia (H)	3	2	0	1	11	8	+3	6	2025 Indoor Hockey World Cup
2	New Zealand	3	1	0	2	8	11	−3	3	

Source: FIH
Rules for classification: 1) points; 2) matches won; 3) goal difference; 4) goals for; 5) head-to-head result; 6) field goals for.
(H) Hosts

== Results ==
All times are local (UTC+10).

24 June 2024
18:00

Australia	5–3	New Zealand
Govers 3', 24'; Dooley 12', 39'; Knee 15'	Report	Scanlon 15'; Atkinson 33'; Greenwood 36'

Umpires:
Adam Barry (AUS)
Jayden Pearson (AUS)

25 June 2024
19:30

Australia	4–2	New Zealand
Govers 17'; Staines 19'; Knee 20'; Harrington 21'	Report	Greenwood 23', 31'

Umpires:
Adam Barry (AUS)
Jayden Pearson (AUS)

26 June 2024
18:00

Australia	2–3	New Zealand
Dooley 28'; Staines 30'	Report	Atkinson 6'; Van Woerkom 19'; Greenwood 39'

Umpires:
Adam Barry (AUS)
Jayden Pearson (AUS)

== Goalscorers ==
There were 19 goals scored in 3 matches, for an average of 6.33 goals per match.

4 goals

- (New Zealand) Tim Greenwood

3 goals

- (Australia) Aiden Dooley

2 goals

- (Australia) Scott Govers
- (Australia) James Knee
- (Australia) Jake Staines
- (New Zealand) Stephen Atkinson

1 goal

- (Australia) Xavier Harrington
- (New Zealand) Daniel Scanlon
- (New Zealand) Benedict van Woerkom

Source: FIH

== See also ==
- 2024 Women's Oceania Indoor World Cup qualifier
