= Edith Molikoe =

South African field hockey player

Personal information
- Full name: Edith Mpolokeng Molikoe
- Born: 23 May 2000 (age 26) Free State, South Africa

Sport
- Sport: Field hockey
- Position: Forward
- Club: Tuks
Senior career
Years	Team	Caps	Goals
2020–	Northern Blues	-	-
2021–	Tuks	-	-
National team
Years	Team	Caps	Goals
2018–	South Africa Indoor	85	(26)
2020–	South Africa	63	(0)
2022	South Africa U21	5	(0)
Medal record
Representing South Africa
Women's field hockey
Africa Cup of Nations
Gold medal – first place	2025 Ismailia
Women's Indoor hockey
Indoor Africa Cup
Gold medal – first place	2024 Swakopmund
Silver medal – second place	2021 Durban
Nkosi Cup
Gold medal – first place	2025 Cape Town
Silver medal – second place	2023 Cape Town
Silver medal – second place	2024 Cape Town
- Updated on 19 December 2024

Edith Mpolokeng Molikoe (born 23 May 2000) is a field hockey player from South Africa. In 2020, she was an athlete at the Summer Olympics.

== Personal life ==
Edith Molikoe was born and raised in the Free State of South Africa. She later moved to Nelson Mandela Bay with her family, where she now resides in Gqeberha.

Molikoe is a former student of Woodridge College, and now studies at the University of Pretoria.

== Career ==
=== Indoor hockey ===
In 2018, Molikoe made her indoor debut during a test series against Zimbabwe. She has gone on to represent the team in various test matches, as well as at the 2021 Indoor Africa Cup.

She was named to the South African U21 Invitational squad.

=== Field hockey ===
Despite never having made an international outdoor appearance, Molikoe was named to the South Africa squad for the 2020 Summer Olympics in Tokyo.

She made her outdoor debut on 24 July 2021, in the Pool A match against Ireland.
