= Koshi =

Koshi or Kōshi may refer to:

== Places ==
- Koshi River, a river in Nepal
- Koshi Province, a province in Nepal named after Koshi river.
- Koshi Rural Municipality, a rural municipality in Nepal.
- Koshi Province (Japan), a historic province of Japan
- Koshi District, Niigata, a former district in Niigata Prefecture, Japan
- Kōshi, Kumamoto, a city in Kumamoto Prefecture, Japan
- Kosi Zone, a former administrative division in Nepal
- Kosi division, an administrative division in Bihar, India
- Kosi, Cyprus, an abandoned village in Larnaca District

== People with the name ==
- Koshi Fujimori (藤森 耕資; born 1961), Japanese water polo player
- Koshi Inaba (稲葉 浩志; born 1964), Japanese singer, songwriter and multi-instrumentalist
- Koshi Kurumizawa (胡桃沢 耕史; 1925–1994)), Japanese writer
- Koshi Mizukami (水上 恒司; born 1999), Japanese actor
- Koshi Osaki (大崎 航詩; born 1998), Japanese footballer
- Koshi Sobu (蘇武 幸志; born 1959), Japanese volleyball player

=== Fictional characters ===
- Kōshi Inuzuka (犬塚 孝士), a character in Sumomomo Momomo
- Kōshi Sugawara (菅原 すがわら 孝支 こうし), a character in "Haikyū!!", third year and setter in the Karasuno team.

== Other uses ==
- Kōshi or kōshijima, Japanese tartan/plaid
- Kōshi, lattice work of shoji screens (room dividers)
- Kōshi or kabura-ya, Japanese signal arrows

== See also ==
- Kashi (disambiguation)
- Kosi (disambiguation)
