= Kiana-Che Cormack =

Namibian field hockey player (born 2001)

Personal information
- Born: 2 August 2001 (age 24) Windhoek, Namibia

Sport
- Sport: Field hockey
- Club: Tuks
Senior career
Years	Team	Caps	Goals
2022-present	Tuks	-	-
2022-present	Northern Blues	-	-
National team
Years	Team	Caps	Goals
2016	Namibia U21	5	(4)
2019-present	Namibia	11	(13)
2019-present	Indoor Namibia	19	(31)
Medal record
Representing Namibia
Women's field hockey
Junior Africa Cup
Bronze medal – third place	2016 Windhoek
Women's indoor hockey
Indoor Africa Cup
Silver medal – second place	2024 Swakopmund
Nkosi Cup
Bronze medal – third place	2025 Cape Town
Gold medal – first place	2023 Cape Town
Gold medal – first place	2024 Cape Town
- Updated on 18 December 2024

Kiana-Che Cormack (born 2 August 2001) is an indoor and field hockey player from Namibia.

== Personal life ==
She attended St. Mary's Diocesan School for Girls, Durban and University of Pretoria.

== International career ==
=== Under–18 ===
She made Namibia U–18 as the African Youth Games in 2018 and 2018 Summer Youth Olympics.

=== Under–21 ===
Cormack made her debut for the Namibia U–21 in 2022 at the 2016 Junior Africa cup.

=== National team ===
Following her successful debut in the indoor at 2018 Women's Indoor Hockey World Cup by the experience, scoring a remarkable nine goals in six matches to finish as the tournament's joint-highest scorer, a prize she shared with Ukraine's Yana Vorushylo.

Cormack debut in the field hockey Test is Namibia v. Zambia.

== Honours ==
=== National ===
- 2018 Indoor Hockey World Cup – Top Goalscorer
- 2023 Nkosi Cup – Top Goalscorer
- 2024 Indoor Africa Cup – Player of the Tournament
- 2023 Nkosi Cup – Top Goalscorer

=== Club/Province ===
- 2023 Indoor IPT – Top Goalscorer (Northern Blues)
