= Mxolisi Mgojo =

South African businessman

- Other name: Mxolisi Donald Mbuyisa Mgojo
- Education: Wharton School of Business
- Occupation: Business executive
- Known for: Former CEO of Exxaro

Mxolisi Donald Mbuyisa Mgojo is a South African businessman. In 2025, he was B20 co-chair and president of Business Unity South Africa. He is the former CEO of Exxaro.

== Career ==
He studied at the Wharton School of Business. Mgojo used to be employed at Eyesizwe Coal. In 2015, he served as a director of Tronox and Richards Bay Coal Terminal. Early in his career, he was Minerals Council South Africa president, and spent eight years in the financial sector.

He became Exxaro's CEO in April 2016. He succeeded Sipho Nkosi. After taking on the role in 2016, he announced his retirement as Exxaro Resources CEO in 2022. In 2023, he owned a minority .17% stake in Exxaro. He was succeeded in May 2023 as Exxaro CEO by Nombasa Tsengwa.

He was appointed president of Business Unity South Africa (Busa) in January 2024. In 2025, he was B20 co-chair and president of Business Unity South Africa.
