= Samantha Economos =

Australian rugby league footballer

Samanatha Economos
- Born: 28 February 1994 (age 32); Bowral, New South Wales, Australia
- Rugby league career

Personal information
- Height: 173 cm (5 ft 8 in)
- Weight: 79 kg (12 st 6 lb)

Playing information
- Position: Prop
Club
Years	Team	Pld	T	G	FG	P
2020	New Zealand Warriors	3	0	0	0	0
2021–24	Sydney Roosters	10	0	0	0	0
	Total	13	0	0	0	0
Representative
Years	Team	Pld	T	G	FG	P
2019	Prime Minister's XIII	1	0	0	0	0
- Source: RLP As of 22 November 2026
- Field hockey career
- Sport: Field hockey
National team
Years	Team	Caps	Goals
2015–present	Australia (indoor)	10	(1)
Medal record
Women's indoor hockey
Nkosi Cup
Silver medal – second place	2025 Cape Town
- Updated on 10 February 2023

Samantha Economos (born 28 February 1994) is an Australian rugby league footballer who last played as a prop for the Sydney Roosters in the NRL Women's Premiership and the Canterbury-Bankstown Bulldogs in the NSWRL Women's Premiership.

She is a Prime Minister's XIII representative.

== Background ==
Born in Bowral, New South Wales, Economos played field hockey before taking up rugby league.

== Playing career ==
In 2017, Economos played rugby league for the Goulburn Workers Bulldogs. In 2018, she joined the Goulburn Stockmen.

In 2019, Economos joined the Canterbury-Bankstown Bulldogs in the NSWRL Women's Premiership. On 11 October 2019, she represented the Prime Minister's XIII in their win over Fiji.

=== 2020 ===
On 18 September, Economos joined the New Zealand Warriors NRL Women's Premiership squad. In Round 1 of the 2020 NRL Women's season, she made her debut for the Warriors in a 14–28 loss to the Brisbane Broncos.
