= Kosi =

Kosi may refer to:

== Places ==
- Kosi River in Nepal and Bihar, India
  - Dudh Kosi River in Nepal, tributary of the Kosi
  - Sun Kosi River in Nepal, tributary of the Kosi
  - Bhote Kosi River in Nepal, tributary of the Sunkosi
- Kosi division, an administrative division of Bihar state, India
- Kosi Tappu Wildlife Reserve, a wildlife reserve in Nepal
- Kosi Zone, an administrative division of Nepal
- Kosi Bay, a lake system and nature reserve in Maputuland, KwaZulu-Natal, South
- Kosi Region, A subregion in Bihar, India and Nepal.

Africa

- Kosi Kalan, a town in Mathura District, Agra Division, Uttar Pradesh, India
- Kosi, Croatia, a village near Viškovo

== People ==
=== Forename ===
- Kosi Kedem (born 1945), Ghanaian politician
- Leota Kosi Latu, Samoan lawyer and diplomat
- Kosi Nwafornso (born 1997), Nigerian footballer
- Kosi Saka (born 1986), Congolese footballer
- Prince Kosi Samuzu (born 1993), Congolese judoka
- Kosi Thompson (born 2003), Canadian soccer player

=== Surname ===
- Edward Kosi (born 1999), New Zealand rugby league footballer
- Jan Kosi (born 1996), Slovenian basketball player
- Klemen Kosi (born 1991), Slovenian alpine skier

== Other ==
- KOSI, an FM radio station (101.1 FM) licensed to serve Denver, Colorado, United States
- KOSI, Kyle of Sutherland Initiative (Highland Scotland development group)

== See also ==
- Koshi (disambiguation)
