= Mxolisi Sizo Nkosi =

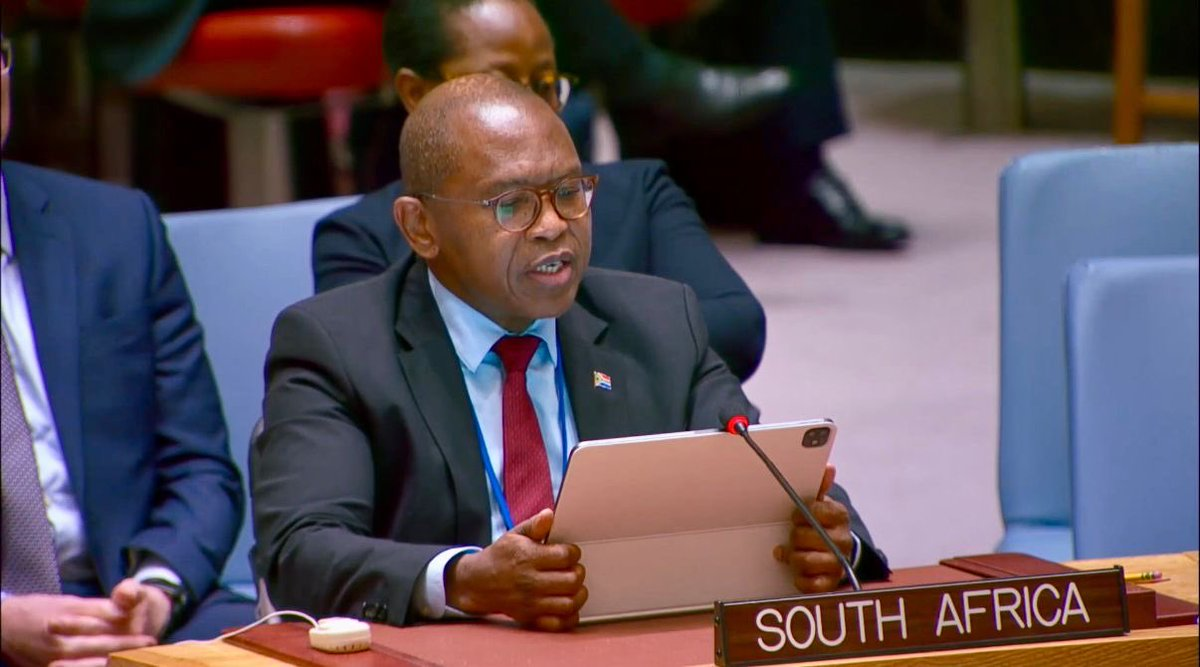
Amb Mxolisi Nkosi delivered South Africa’s Statement during the UNSC Debate on the Protection of Civilians in Armed Conflict

Mxolisi Nkosi (born 26 June 1967), in Soweto, South Africa is the Ambassador and Permanent Representative of South Africa to the United Nations in New York.

He served as the Ambassador and Permanent Representative of South Africa to the United Nations in Geneva and Other International Organisations in Switzerland. He has served in several senior positions in the Foreign Ministry of post-Apartheid South Africa. Between February 2012 and March 2016 was the South African Ambassador to the Kingdom of Belgium, the Grand Duchy of Luxembourg and the Head of Mission to the European Union. Until his appointment as South Africa’s Ambassador to the United Nations in Geneva, he was the Head of Global Governance and Continental Agenda in the South African Foreign Ministry, and President Cyril Ramaphosa’s Sherpa to G7 Outreach Sessions.

An expert in the field of international relations and diplomacy, Nkosi previously headed Africa Branch in the Foreign Ministry. He has travelled extensively throughout the world and in Africa, and accompanied high-level delegations of former President Thabo Mbeki, President Jacob Zuma, former Foreign Ministers Nkosazana Dlamini-Zuma and Maite Nkoana-Mashabane, and now President Cyril Ramaphosa and Minister Naledi Pandor.

== Previous work ==
Before joining the government, Nkosi was a trade union leader, where he served as the Deputy General Secretary of the South African Democratic Teachers Union (SADTU), an affiliate of the Congress of South African Trade Unions (COSATU). At the same time he was also a member of the Provincial Executive Committee of the South African Communist Party (SACP). Nkosi was a student and youth activist in Soweto, occupying several leadership positions in the Azanian Students' Congress (AZASO) and in the South African Students' Congress (SANSCO). Trained as a teacher, Nkosi holds a Master's degree in International Relations and Diplomacy.
