= List of current NRL Women's coaches =

This list includes the appointment date and performance record of current NRL Women's senior coaches. The league consists of six clubs across Australia.

== Coaches ==
Team	Name	Appointed (Note: Appointment date of current term at the team.)	Time as coach	Prem	W	L	D	GC	Win%	Prem	W	L	D	GC	Win%	Source
Team	Name	Appointed	Time as coach	Current (Note: Coaching statistics from the current term with the team; coaching statistics from previous term with the team are not included.)						Career (Note: Coaching statistics for career in the NRLW, records in other leagues are not included.)						Source
Brisbane Broncos	Kelvin Wright	14 May 2019	5 years, 296 days	2	11	3	0	14	79%	2	11	3	0	14	75%	
Gold Coast Titans	Jamie Feeney	24 June 2021	3 years, 265 days	0	3	3	0	6	50%	0	5	5	0	10	50%	
Newcastle Knights	Casey Bromilow	25 November 2021	3 years, 101 days	0	0	5	0	5	0%	0	0	5	0	5	0%	
Parramatta Eels	Dean Widders	11 June 2021	3 years, 268 days	0	2	3	0	5	40%	0	2	3	0	5	40%	
St. George Illawarra Dragons	Jamie Soward	21 October 2021	3 years, 136 days	0	5	2	0	7	71%	0	5	2	0	7	71%	
Sydney Roosters	John Strange	25 February 2021	4 years, 9 days	1	4	3	0	7	57%	1	4	3	0	7	57%	

== See also ==
- List of current NRL coaches
