= Nkosi Cup =

Biennial indoor hockey competition

- Sport: indoor hockey
- Organizing body: South African Hockey Association; Pro Series Indoor (PSi)
- Country: South Africa
- Venue: Wynberg Military Base Stadium

The Nkosi Cup (Note: Nkosi is a Nguni word for “king”, “chief” and “lord”) is an annual, international indoor hockey tournament held in South Africa.

== Men's tournament ==
=== Results ===
Year	Host	Final			Bronze medal match			Number of teams
Year	Host	Gold medal	Score	Silver medal	Bronze medal	Score	Fourth place	Number of teams
2023; Details	Cape Town	South Africa	10–2	Namibia	United States	Only three teams.		3
2024; Details	Cape Town	South Africa	3–2	Namibia	Ireland	5–5 (2–0 s.o.)	New Zealand	4
2025; Details	Cape Town	South Africa	10–4	Australia	New Zealand	3–2	Namibia	5
2026; Details	Cape Town							7

=== Summary ===
Team	Gold medal	Silver medal	Bronze medal
South Africa	3 (2023, 2024, 2025)		
Namibia		2 (2023, 2024)	
Australia		1 (2025)	
United States			1 (2023)
Ireland			1 (2024)
New Zealand			1 (2025)

=== Team appearances ===
Team	2023	2024	2025	2026	Years
Australia	–	–	2nd	Q	2
Ireland	3rd	3rd	–	Q	3
Malaysia	–	–	–	Q	1
Namibia	1st	1st	3rd	Q	4
New Zealand	–	–	4th	Q	2
South Africa	2nd	2nd	1st	Q	4
Zimbabwe	–	–	5th	Q	2
Total	3	3	5	7	

== Women's tournament ==
=== Results ===
Year	Host	Final			Bronze medal match			Number of teams
Year	Host	Gold medal	Score	Silver medal	Bronze medal	Score	Fourth place	Number of teams
2023; Details	Cape Town	Namibia	4–2	South Africa	Ireland	Only three teams.		3
2024; Details	Cape Town	Namibia	3–1	South Africa	Ireland	Only three teams.		3
2025; Details	Cape Town	South Africa	4–3	Australia	Namibia	6–1	New Zealand	5
2026; Details	Cape Town							7

=== Summary ===
Team	Gold medal	Silver medal	Bronze medal
Namibia	2 (2023, 2024)		1 (2025)
South Africa	1 (2025)	2 (2023, 2024)	
Australia		1 (2025)	
Ireland			2 (2023, 2024)

=== Team appearances ===
Team	2023	2024	2025	Years
Australia	–	–	2nd	1
Ireland	3rd	3rd	–	2
Namibia	1st	1st	3rd	3
New Zealand	–	–	4th	1
South Africa	2nd	2nd	1st	3
Zimbabwe	–	–	5th	1
Total	3	3	5	
