= Australia women's national indoor hockey team =

Australia
- Nickname: Platypushers
- Association: Hockey Australia
- Confederation: OHF (Oceania)
- Coach: Emma McLeish
- Manager: Danah Dunkeld & Kris Hooley
- Captain: Elizabeth Duguid
Home	Away

FIH ranking
- Current: 5 ▲ (August 2024)
- Lowest: 9 (14 February 2023)

World Cup
- Appearances: 6 (first in 2003)
- Best result: 6th (2007, 2018)

The Australia women's national indoor hockey team are Australia's national women's indoor hockey team. As of January 2016, they are ranked 8th in the world. Australia competes internationally in indoor hockey, with the Australian women’s indoor team undertaking a tour annually. Every four years, Australia competes in the FIH Indoor Hockey World Cup. The Australian national indoor team is nominated and selected from the indoor Australian Championships.

== World Cup Rankings ==
In the first Indoor Hockey World Cup, held in Germany in 2003, the Australian team came 9th in the final standings. Their best placing is 6th, achieved in the 2007 World Cup in Vienna, Austria. In the 2011 and 2015 World Cups, they finished in 8th spot. In 2018 the Australian team finished 6th, thereby equalling their best ever result.

== Tournament records ==
=== Indoor Hockey World Cup ===
- 2003 - 9th
- 2007 - 6th
- 2011 - 8th
- 2015 - 8th
- 2018 - 6th
- 2023 - 7th
- 2025 – 10th

=== Tuanku Zara Cup ===
- 2023 – (bronze)

=== Nkosi Cup ===
- 2025 – (silver)

== Current squad ==
Squad for the 2025 Women's FIH Indoor Hockey World Cup.

Head coach: Emma McLeish

1. Brooke Welsh
3. Caitlin Burns
6. Elizabeth Duguid (C, GK)
10. Ella White
12. Annelyse Tevant
14. Tegan Boucher
15. Emma Scriven
16. Emma Leighton (GK)
17. Erin Burns
21. Jamie Zimmerman
25. Kelsey Hughes
31. Tegan Neowhouse (GK)
32. Eden Jackat
34. Samantha Economos

== See also ==
- Kookaburras – Australia men's national field hockey team
- Australian field hockey players
- Australia women's national field hockey team
- Indoor field hockey
- Indoor Hockey World Cup
- FIH Indoor Rankings
