= Wynberg Military Base Stadium =

Floodlit football stadium in Wynberg, Cape Town, South Africa

- Also known as: Wynberg Military Base; Wynberg Military Stadium; Wynberg Stadium
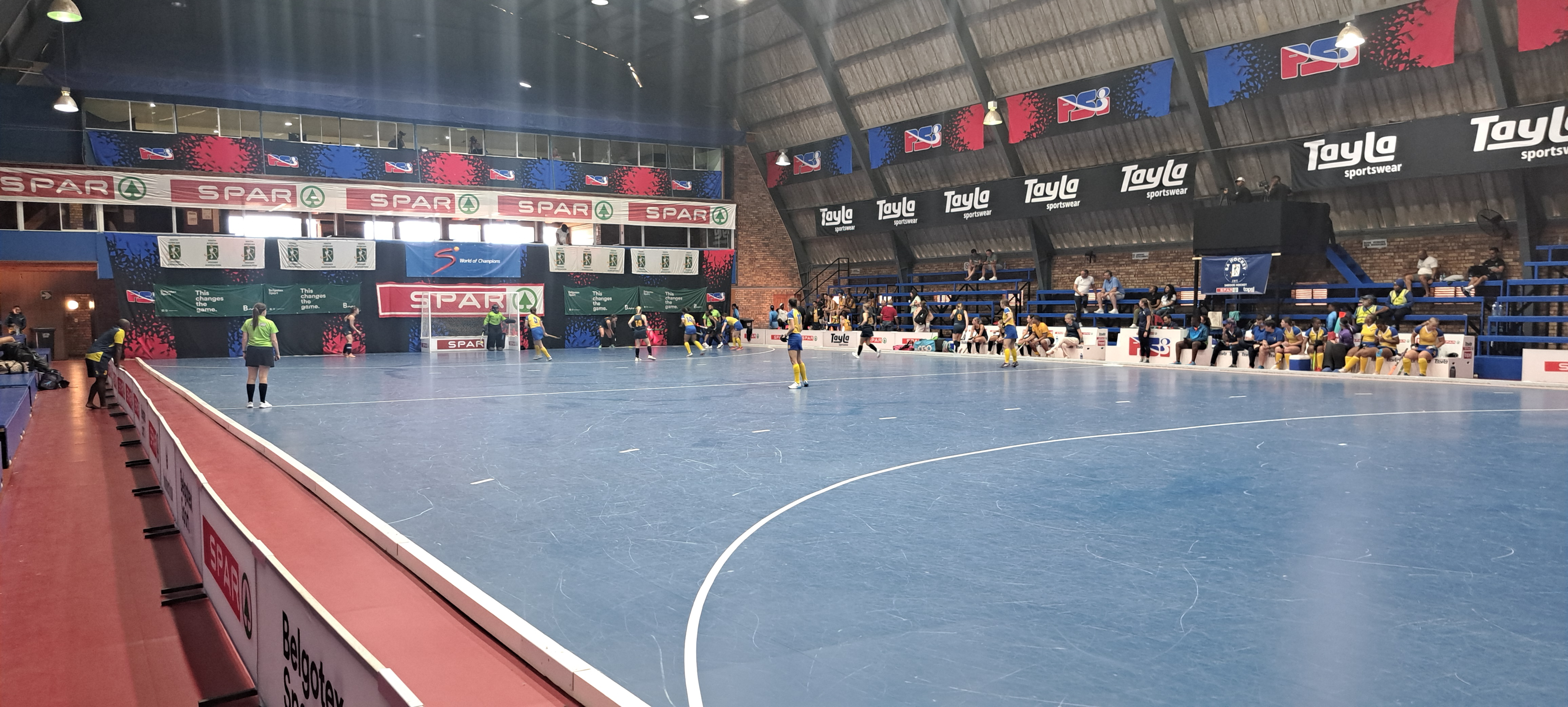
- A view inside the sports hall of the Military Base Stadium.
- Interactive map of Wynberg Military Base Stadium
- Location: Wynberg Military Sports Facilities; Wynberg, Cape Town, Western Cape, South Africa
- Coordinates: 34°00′32″S 18°27′39″E
- Capacity: 2,500 (no seats, all standing)
- Surface: Grass

Tenant
- Hanover Park

Wynberg Military Base Stadium is a floodlit football stadium, situated in Wynberg suburb of Cape Town, at the Western Cape Province in South Africa. It is basically a part of the Wynberg Military Base, or to be more exact, a part of the Wynberg Military Base Sports Facilities. Besides the main football stadium, these facilities include 2 other floodlit football pitches, floodlit tennis courts, a swimming pool, a large sports hall with changing rooms, a fitness suite, canteen, offices and a large meeting room.

== Football related tenants ==
=== WP United ===
For the two seasons of 2006–08, the National First Division club Western Province United played all their home matches at the football stadium. This club was original founded in 1998 with the name FC Fortune. Then they changed their name to Cape United Football Club in 2005–06, and when they purchased a franchise license to play at the National First Division in 2006–07, they once again changed their name to Western Province United. As of May 2011, this is still the name of the club, although they are commonly nicknamed WP United. When the club in May 2008 got relegated to play in Vodacom League, they decided to move their home venue, to some of the less expensive stadiums in Cape Town.

=== Cape United Soccer School ===
In June 2008, Cape United Soccer School of Excellence was founded, and in April 2009 they opened up the doors for the first football class, to train and play at the Wynberg Military Sports facilities. The school offer a 2-year football education, for all the best football talents with an age of 15–18 years, scouted inside the borders of Western Cape. It is operating through large donated international sponsorships, and thus an entirely independent school, compared to other township supported football schools in South Africa. Each year the school educates 30 hopeful football talents, of which several prefer to sign with one of the football clubs in Europe, while the majority of the remaining bunch continue to have a professional football career in South Africa. The school was renamed to ASD Cape Town in January 2011, and at the same time moved their training and playing field to University of Cape Town at Chapel Road, in the nearby suburb Rondebosch.

=== Hanover Park ===
During the 2009-10 football season, the National First Division club Hanover Park opted to play two of their home matches at the stadium. Since September 2010, the club opted to use and rent the stadium, as their sole home venue.

== Sports hall ==
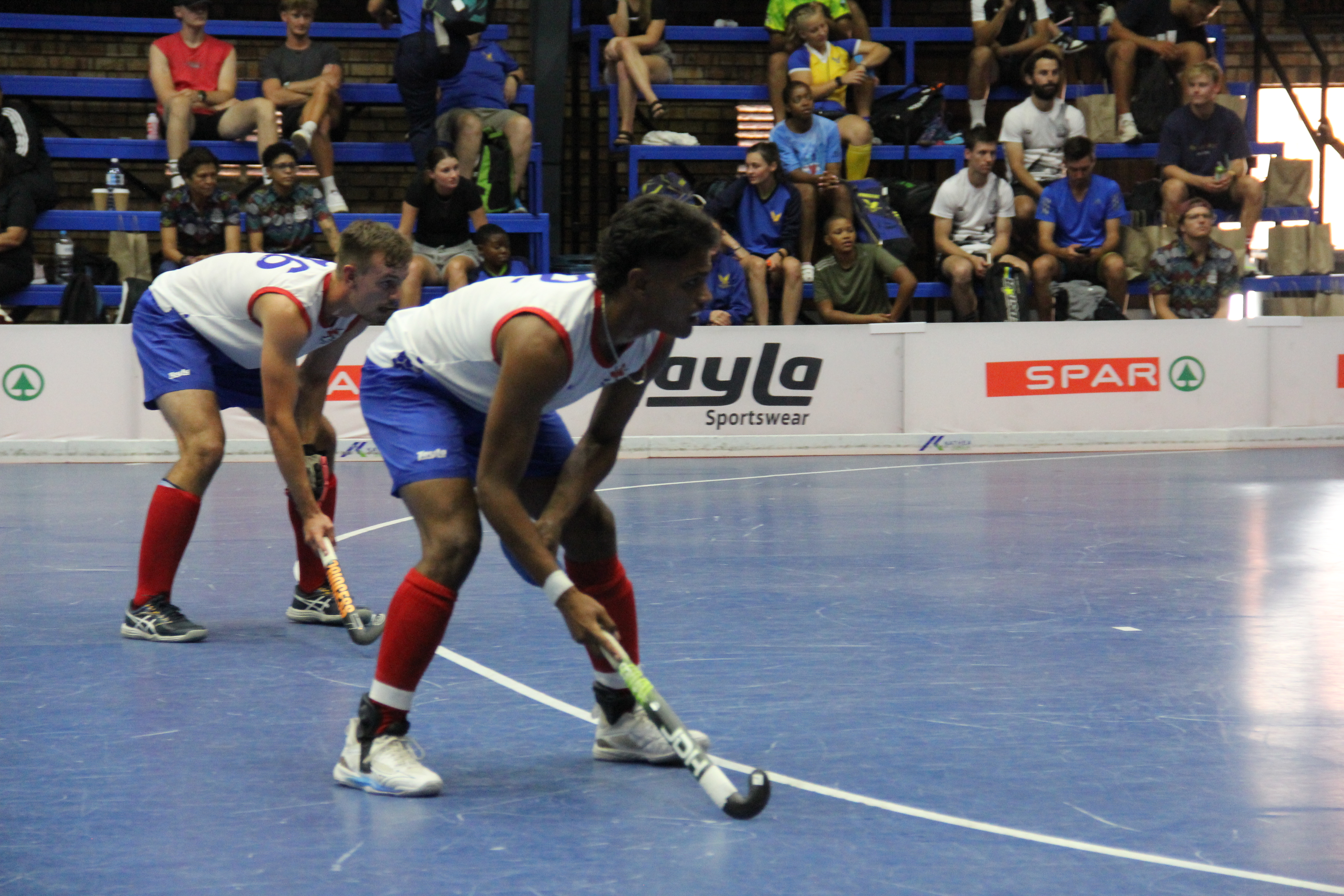
Western Province v Southern Gauteng: Mustapha Cassiem and Cody van der Merwe prepares to take a penalty corner.

The Nkosi Cup is an annual, international indoor hockey tournament. The 2024 indoor Inter-Provincial Tournament in indoor hockey.
