= 2016 Women's EuroHockey Indoor Championship =

Tournament details
- Host country: Belarus
- City: Minsk
- Dates: 22–24 January
- Teams: 8 (from 1 confederation)
- Venue: Minsk Sports Palace

Final positions
- Champions: Netherlands (2nd title)
- Runner-up: Poland
- Third place: Belarus

Tournament statistics
- Matches played: 20
- Goals scored: 114 (5.7 per match)
- Top scorer(s): (Czech Republic) Adéla Bížová (Netherlands) Lieke van Wijk (8 goals)

The 2016 Women's EuroHockey Indoor Championship was the 17th edition of the Women's EuroHockey Indoor Championship, the biennial international indoor hockey championship of Europe for women organized by the European Hockey Federation.. It took place from 22 to 24 January 2016 at the Minsk Sports Palace in Minsk, Belarus.

The defending champions the Netherlands won their second title by defeating Poland 6–2 in the final. The hosts Belarus won the bronze medal by defeating Germany 6–5. The top six teams qualified for the 2018 Women's Indoor Hockey World Cup.

== Qualified teams ==
The following teams participated in the 2016 EuroHockey Indoor Championship.

Dates	Event	Location	Quotas	Qualifiers
24–26 January 2014	2014 EuroHockey Indoor Championship	Prague, Czech Republic	6	Austria; Belarus; Czech Republic; Germany; Netherlands; Poland
24–26 January 2014	2014 EuroHockey Indoor Championship II	Šiauliai, Lithuania	2	Belgium; Ukraine
Total			8	

== Preliminary round ==
All times are local (UTC+3).

=== Pool A ===
Pos	Team	Pld	W	D	L	GF	GA	GD	Pts	Qualification
1	Netherlands	3	3	0	0	23	2	+21	9	Semi-finals and 2018 Indoor World Cup
2	Poland	3	2	0	1	9	10	−1	6	Semi-finals and 2018 Indoor World Cup
3	Czech Republic	3	1	0	2	6	13	−7	3	Pool C
4	Belgium	3	0	0	3	2	15	−13	0	Pool C

Source: FIH
Rules for classification: 1) points; 2) goal difference; 3) goals scored; 4) head-to-head result.

22 January 2016
10:00

Netherlands	9–0	Poland
Hulsen 2', 9', 15'; Veen 8'; L. van Wijk 17'; Vorstenbosch 19'; Van den Assem 25'; Matla 28'; De Lange 30'	Report

Umpires:
Violeta Eismayer (AUT)
Olena Klymenko (UKR)

22 January 2016
11:10

Czech Republic	5–0	Belgium
Bížová 10', 21'; Reichlová 24'; Haklová 27'; Kolářová 29'	Report

Umpires:
Michelle Meister (GER)
Liudmila Aleinikoviene (BLR)

22 January 2016
16:00

Poland	5–1	Belgium
Wieloch 13'; Okaj 19', FG'; Katerla 25', 28'	Report	Van der Gracht 31'

Umpires:
Daniela Kavanová (CZE)
Frances Block (ENG)

22 January 2016
17:10

Czech Republic	1–9	Netherlands
Bížová 8'	Report	Hulsen 2'; De Lange 4', 20'; K. van Wijk 6', 26'; Zwinkels 9', 17'; Vorstenbosch 24'; L. van Wijk 27'

Umpires:
Liudmila Aleinikoviene (BLR)
Violeta Eismayer (AUT)

23 January 2016
09:00

Netherlands	5–1	Belgium
Hulsen 3'; K. van Wijk 7'; L. van Wijk 23', 30'; Zwinkels 27'	Report	Motte 37'

Umpires:
Katarzyna Grudziewicz (POL)
Liudmila Aleinikoviene (BLR)

23 January 2016
10:10

Poland	4–0	Czech Republic
Katerla 28'; Sztybrych 34'; Wieloch 40'; Okaj 40+'	Report

Umpires:
Olena Klymenko (UKR)
Michelle Meister (GER)

=== Pool B ===
Pos	Team	Pld	W	D	L	GF	GA	GD	Pts	Qualification
1	Belarus (H)	3	3	0	0	10	5	+5	9	Semi-finals and 2018 Indoor World Cup
2	Germany	3	2	0	1	6	4	+2	6	Semi-finals and 2018 Indoor World Cup
3	Ukraine	3	1	0	2	7	5	+2	3	Pool C
4	Austria	3	0	0	3	2	11	−9	0	Pool C

Source: FIH
Rules for classification: 1) points; 2) goal difference; 3) goals scored; 4) head-to-head result.
(H) Hosts

22 January 2016
12:20

Austria	1–6	Ukraine
Zerbs 36'	Report	Shevchenko 2'; Kernoz 8'; Vorushylo 17', 31'; Honcharenko 27', 34'

Umpires:
Frances Block (ENG)
Katarzyna Grudziewicz (POL)

22 January 2016
13:30

Germany	3–4	Belarus
Meffert 7'; Huse 36', 38'	Report	Batura 1'; Kurhanskaya 20'; Silitskaya 24'; Papkova 35'

Umpires:
Sarah Wilson (SCO)
Daniela Kavanová (CZE)

22 January 2016
18:20

Austria	0–2	Germany
	Report	Müller-Wieland 25'; Martin-Pelegrina 29'

Umpires:
Celine Martin-Schmets (BEL)
Claire Druijts (NED)

22 January 2016
19:30

Belarus	3–1	Ukraine
Syrayezhka 21'; Batura 39'; Kurhanskaya 40'	Report	Kernoz 37'

Umpires:
Katarzyna Grudziewicz (POL)
Michelle Meister (GER)

23 January 2016
11:20

Germany	1–0	Ukraine
Meffert 36'	Report

Umpires:
Claire Druijts (NED)
Sarah Wilson (SCO)

23 January 2016
12:30

Belarus	3–1	Austria
Bahushevich 8'; Batura 18'; Papkova 35'	Report	Laginja 25'

Umpires:
Celine Martin-Schmets (BEL)
Frances Block (ENG)

== Fifth to eighth place classification ==
=== Pool C ===
The result between the teams from the same preliminary round pool were carried over.

Pos	Team	Pld	W	D	L	GF	GA	GD	Pts	Qualification or relegation
5	Ukraine	3	2	1	0	12	6	+6	7	Qualification for the 2018 Indoor World Cup
6	Czech Republic	3	1	1	1	10	6	+4	4	Qualification for the 2018 Indoor World Cup
7	Austria (R)	3	0	2	1	6	11	−5	2	Relegation to the Indoor Championship II
8	Belgium (R)	3	0	2	1	5	10	−5	2	Relegation to the Indoor Championship II

Source: FIH
Rules for classification: 1) points; 2) goal difference; 3) goals scored; 4) head-to-head result.
(R) Relegated

23 January 2016
15:30

Belgium	2–2	Austria
T. Duquesne 19'; Van der Gracht 38'	Report	Vukovich 25'; Busch 33'

Umpires:
Olena Klymenko (UKR)
Liudmila Aleinikoviene (BLR)

23 January 2016
16:40

Czech Republic	2–3	Ukraine
Bížová 22', 40'	Report	Vorushylo 7', 39'; Shevchenko 20'

Umpires:
Celine Martin-Schmets (BEL)
Violeta Eismayer (AUT)

24 January 2016
10:00

Ukraine	3–3	Belgium
Shevchenko 9'; Honcharenko 14'; Korotaieva 25'	Report	T. Duquesne 28'; Ronquetti 32', 37'

Umpires:
Daniela Kavanová (CZE)
Claire Druijts (NED)

24 January 2016
11:10

Czech Republic	3–3	Austria
Bížová 3', 38', 40'	Report	Zerbs 2', 29'; Busch 7'

Umpires:
Sarah Wilson (SCO)
Olena Klymenko (UKR)

== First to fourth place classification ==
=== Bracket ===
Semi-finals
23 January
Netherlands	5
Germany	2
23 January
Belarus	1 (2)
Poland (p.s.o.)	1 (3)

Final
24 January
Netherlands	6
Poland	2
Third place
24 January
Germany	5
Belarus	6

=== Semi-finals ===
23 January 2016
17:50

Netherlands	5–2	Germany
Muyselaar 12'; L. van Wijk 18', 29', 34'; Zwinkels 35'	Report	Dudorov 9'; Müller-Wieland 32'

Umpires:
Frances Block (ENG)
Sarah Wilson (SCO)

23 January 2016
19:15

Belarus	1–1	Poland
Kurhanskaya 11'	Report	Sławińska 23'
Penalties
Papkova (penalty shoot-out scored); Batura (penalty shoot-out missed); Kurhanskaya (penalty shoot-out missed); Papkova (penalty shoot-out scored); Batura (penalty shoot-out missed)	2–3	(penalty shoot-out missed) Sławińska; (penalty shoot-out missed) Katerla; (penalty shoot-out scored) Wieloch; (penalty shoot-out scored) Sławińska; (penalty shoot-out scored) Katerla

Umpires:
Michelle Meister (GER)
Claire Druijts (NED)

=== Third and fourth place ===
24 January 2016
13:00

Belarus	6–5	Germany
Batura 3', 32'; Papkova 5', 39'; Bahushevich 23'; Syrayezhka 33'	Report	Windfeder 15'; Huse 16', 38'; Dudorov 23'; Lorenzen 30'

Umpires:
Violeta Eismayer (AUT)
Celine Martin-Schmets (BEL)

=== Final ===
24 January 2016
14:30

Poland	2–6	Netherlands
Mika 18'; Okaj 28'	Report	Zwinkels 4'; L. van Wijk 16'; Hulsen 22'; De Lange 30'; Veen 31'; Matla 37'

Umpires:
Frances Block (ENG)
Michelle Meister (GER)

== Statistics ==
=== Final standings ===
Pos	Team	Qualification or relegation
1	Netherlands (C)	Qualification for the 2018 Indoor World Cup
2	Poland	Qualification for the 2018 Indoor World Cup
3	Belarus (H)	Qualification for the 2018 Indoor World Cup
4	Germany	Qualification for the 2018 Indoor World Cup
5	Ukraine	Qualification for the 2018 Indoor World Cup
6	Czech Republic	Qualification for the 2018 Indoor World Cup
7	Austria (R)	Relegation to the EuroHockey Indoor Championship II
8	Belgium (R)	Relegation to the EuroHockey Indoor Championship II

Source: FIH
(C) Champion; (H) Host; (R) Relegated

=== Goalscorers ===
There were 114 goals scored in 20 matches, for an average of 5.7 goals per match.

8 goals

- (Czech Republic) Adéla Bižová
- (Netherlands) Lieke van Wijk

6 goals

- (Netherlands) Lieke Hulsen

5 goals

- (Belarus) Ryta Batura
- (Netherlands) Donja Zwinkels

4 goals

- (Belarus) Krestina Papkova
- (Germany) Viktoria Huse
- (Netherlands) Lisanne de Lange
- (Poland) Paulina Okaj
- (Ukraine) Yana Vorushylo

3 goals

- (Austria) Corinna Zerbs
- (Belarus) Yuliya Kurhanskaya
- (Netherlands) Kiki van Wijk
- (Poland) Amelia Katerła
- (Ukraine) Olha Honcharenko
- (Ukraine) Yuliya Shevchenko

2 goals

- (Austria) Julia Busch
- (Belarus) Sviatlana Bahushevich
- (Belarus) Nastassia Syrayezhka
- (Belgium) Tiphaine Duquesne
- (Belgium) Marie Ronquetti
- (Belgium) Charlotte van der Gracht
- (Germany) Julia Dudurov
- (Germany) Julia Meffert
- (Germany) Roda Müller-Wieland
- (Netherlands) Frédérique Matla
- (Netherlands) Marijn Veen
- (Netherlands) Vera Vorstenbosch
- (Poland) Joanna Wieloch
- (Ukraine) Yevheniya Kernoz

1 goal

- (Austria) Marta Laginja
- (Austria) Kristine Vukovich
- (Belarus) Nadzeya Silitskaya
- (Belgium) Perrine Motte
- (Czech Republic) Bárbora Háklová
- (Czech Republic) Anna Kolářová
- (Czech Republic) Jindřiška Reichlová
- (Germany) Silja Lorenzen
- (Germany) Teresa Martin-Pelegrina
- (Germany) Katharina Windfeder
- (Netherlands) Mila Muyselaar
- (Netherlands) Ireen van den Assem
- (Poland) Joanna Mika
- (Poland) Paula Sławińska
- (Poland) Małgorzata Sztybrych
- (Ukraine) Yana Korotaieva

Source: FIH

== See also ==
- 2016 Men's EuroHockey Indoor Championship
- 2016 Women's EuroHockey Indoor Championship II
