= 2026 Women's EuroHockey Indoor Championship =

Tournament details
- Host country: Czech Republic
- City: Prague
- Dates: 15–18 January
- Teams: 10 (from 1 confederation)
- Venue: UNYP Arena

Final positions
- Champions: Germany (18th title)
- Runner-up: Czechia
- Third place: Austria

Tournament statistics
- Matches played: 29
- Goals scored: 190 (6.55 per match)
- Top scorer: (Ukraine) Karyna Leonova (11 goals)
- Best player: (Spain) Marta Grau
- Best young player: (Austria) Katharina Proksch
- Best goalkeeper: (Czech Republic) Barbora Čecháková

The 2026 Women's EuroHockey Indoor Championship was the 23rd edition of the Women's EuroHockey Indoor Championship, the biennial international women's indoor hockey championship of Europe organized by the European Hockey Federation.

It was held at the UNYP Arena in Prague, Czech Republic from 15 to 18 January 2026. It was the third time Prague will host the event.

Germany were the two-time defending champions. They defended their title by defeating the hosts Czechia 5–2 in the final. Germany won a record-extending 18th title, while the Czech Republic reached the final for the first time. Austria won the bronze medal by defeating Spain 3–2. Lithuania and Ireland were relegated to the Championship II after one year in the top division.

== Qualification ==
The top eighth teams from the 2024 edition together with the top two teams from the Championship II participated in the 2026 edition.

=== Qualified teams ===
The following ten teams participated in the 2026 EuroHockey Indoor Championship.

| Dates | Event | Location | Quotas | Qualifiers |
|---|---|---|---|---|
| 8–11 February 2024 | 2024 EuroHockey Indoor Championship | Berlin, Germany | 8 | Austria; Belgium; Czechia; Germany; Poland; Spain; Switzerland; Ukraine |
| 9–11 February 2024 | 2024 EuroHockey Indoor Championship II | Galway, Ireland | 2 | Ireland; Lithuania |
| Total | | | 10 | |

== Preliminary round ==
All times are local (UTC+1).

=== Pool A ===
| Pos | Team | Pld | W | D | L | GF | GA | GD | Pts | Qualification or relegation |
|---|---|---|---|---|---|---|---|---|---|---|
| 1 | Austria | 4 | 2 | 2 | 0 | 16 | 7 | +9 | 8 | Qualification for the semi-finals |
| 2 | Germany | 4 | 2 | 1 | 1 | 19 | 12 | +7 | 7 | Qualification for the semi-finals |
| 3 | Belgium | 4 | 2 | 1 | 1 | 16 | 12 | +4 | 7 | |
| 4 | Switzerland | 4 | 1 | 2 | 1 | 14 | 11 | +3 | 5 | |
| 5 | Ireland (R) | 4 | 0 | 0 | 4 | 2 | 25 | −23 | 0 | Relegation to the Indoor Championship II |

Source: FIH
Rules for classification: 1) points; 2) matches won; 3) goal difference; 4) goals for; 5) head-to-head result; 6) field goals for.
(R) Relegated

15 January 2026
09:30

| Belgium | 4−3 | Switzerland |
|---|---|---|
| Gose-Claessens 2', 3'; Barry 4', 18' | Report | Stomps 9', 13'; Berlie 39' |

Umpires:
Abby MacArthur (WAL)
Manouk Bakker (NED)

15 January 2026
10:55

| Germany | 6−0 | Ireland |
|---|---|---|
| Scheuer 4', 29'; Drumm 8'; Poppe 13', 24'; Gerstenhöfer 38' | Report |

Umpires:
Lukasz Orzeł (POL)
Una Mihajlović (CRO)

15 January 2026
16:00

| Germany | 5−5 | Switzerland |
|---|---|---|
| Scheuer 3'; Poppe 16', 30+'; Hendrix 3'; Drumm 39' | Report | Flury 3'; Trösch 13'; Stomps 22'; Zepf 30'; Triebold 40' |

Umpires:
Lizelotte Wolter (NED)
Lukasz Orzeł (POL)

15 January 2026
17:25

| Austria | 8−0 | Ireland |
|---|---|---|
| Buchta 1'; Czech 8', 21'; Buchleitner 18'; Hahnenkamp 22', 30'; Herzog 31'; Proksch 38' | Report |

Umpires:
Ole Ingwersen (GER)
Manouk Bakker (NED)

16 January 2026
10:00

| Switzerland | 5−1 | Ireland |
|---|---|---|
| Weber 18'; Trösch 32'; Stomps 33'; Flury 37'; Berlie 40' | Report | Brown 29' |

Umpires:
Steven Bakker (NED)
Abby MacArthur (WAL)

16 January 2026
11:20

| Belgium | 3−3 | Austria |
|---|---|---|
| De Mot 17', 36'; Gose-Claessens 38' | Report | Bauer 16'; Kern 28', 36' |

Umpires:
Ana Faias (POR)
Ole Ingwersen (GER)

16 January 2026
16:00

| Ireland | 1−6 | Belgium |
|---|---|---|
| Spence 40+' | Report | De Mot 9'; Ronquetti 14', 32', 33'; Barry 27'; Delva 30' |

Umpires:
Michael Gholami-Eilmer (AUT)
Ole Ingwersen (GER)

16 January 2026
17:20

| Germany | 3−4 | Austria |
|---|---|---|
| Poppe 11'; Pieper 17'; Scheuer 36' | Report | Kern 2'; Buchta 10', 19'; Czech 28' |

Umpires:
Lizelotte Wolter (NED)
Una Mihajlović (CRO)

17 January 2026
09:00

| Belgium | 3−5 | Germany |
|---|---|---|
| Barry 5'; Coudron 6'; Delva 18' | Report | Gerstenhöfer 21', 29', 40'; Drumm 24'; Scheuer 32' |

Umpires:
Ana Faias (POR)
Michael Gholami-Eilmer (AUT)

17 January 2026
10:20

| Austria | 1−1 | Switzerland |
|---|---|---|
| Buchleitner 34' | Report | Stomps 38' |

Umpires:
Sarah Craig (IRL)
Steven Bakker (NED)

=== Pool B ===
| Pos | Team | Pld | W | D | L | GF | GA | GD | Pts | Qualification or relegation |
|---|---|---|---|---|---|---|---|---|---|---|
| 1 | Spain | 4 | 3 | 1 | 0 | 19 | 8 | +11 | 10 | Qualification for the semi-finals |
| 2 | Czechia (H) | 4 | 2 | 1 | 1 | 17 | 14 | +3 | 7 | Qualification for the semi-finals |
| 3 | Ukraine | 4 | 2 | 0 | 2 | 19 | 9 | +10 | 6 | |
| 4 | Poland | 4 | 1 | 2 | 1 | 11 | 9 | +2 | 5 | |
| 5 | Lithuania (R) | 4 | 0 | 0 | 4 | 2 | 28 | −26 | 0 | Relegation to the Indoor Championship II |

Source: FIH
Rules for classification: 1) points; 2) matches won; 3) goal difference; 4) goals for; 5) head-to-head result; 6) field goals for.
(H) Hosts; (R) Relegated

15 January 2026
12:20

| Ukraine | 3−4 | Spain |
|---|---|---|
| Honcharenko 22', 13'; Leonova 26' | Report | Lopez 15'; Grau 19', 35', 37' |

Umpires:
Ana Faias (POR)
Steven Bakker (NED)

15 January 2026
13:45

| Poland | 6−0 | Lithuania |
|---|---|---|
| Zimmermann 3'; Balcerzak 16', 32'; Czujewicz 19'; Drozda 19'; Arciszewska 23' | Report |

Umpires:
Michael Gholami-Eilmer (AUT)
Sarah Craig (IRL)

15 January 2026
18:50

| Poland | 2−2 | Spain |
|---|---|---|
| Wochna 22'; Zimmermann 24' | Report | Ycart 29'; Grau 39' |

Umpires:
Abby MacArthur (WAL)
Michael Gholami-Eilmer (AUT)

15 January 2026
20:15

| Czechia | 6−2 | Lithuania |
|---|---|---|
| Nováková 3'; Hájková 5'; Lehovcová 9'; Semrádová 25'; Přibíková 26', 40' | Report | Banevičiūtė 12'; Dimskytė 24' |

Umpires:
Una Mihajlovič (CRO)
Steven Bakker (NED)

16 January 2026
12:40

| Spain | 8−0 | Lithuania |
|---|---|---|
| Grau 2', 29'; Ycart 7'; Canales 10+'; Carmona Ramos 16'; Perez 30'; Abajo 32'; Forte 33' | Report |

Umpires:
Una Mihajlovič (CRO)
Lukasz Orzeł (POL)

16 January 2026
14:00

| Ukraine | 4−5 | Czechia |
|---|---|---|
| Leonova 7'; Movchan 16'; Honcharenko 22'; Popova 27' | Report | Semrádová 14'; Přibíková 21'; Duchková 26'; Nováková 30'; Hájková 40' |

Umpires:
Lizelotte Wolter (NED)
Sarah Craig (IRL)

16 January 2026
18:40

| Lithuania | 0−8 | Ukraine |
|---|---|---|
| | Report | Leonova 13', 29', 33'; Popova 17'; Movchan 28', 35'; Tanchenko 31'; Basanets 37' |

Umpires:
Lukasz Orzeł (POL)
Sarah Craig (IRL)

16 January 2026
20:00

| Poland | 3−3 | Czechia |
|---|---|---|
| Katerla 2'; Zimmermann 12'; Wochna 23' | Report | Nováková 2'; Lehovcová 9', 15' |

Umpires:
Manouk Bakker (NED)
Ana Faias (POR)

17 January 2026
11:40

| Ukraine | 4−0 | Poland |
|---|---|---|
| Leonova 4', 40', 40'; Popova 10' | Report |

Umpires:
Abby MacArthur (WAL)
Manouk Bakker (NED)

17 January 2026
13:00

| Czechia | 3−5 | Spain |
|---|---|---|
| Babická 3', 25'; Laciná 37' | Report | Perez 10'; Ycart 18'; Grau 31'; Lopez 34'; Carmona Ramos 40' |

Umpires:
Ole Ingwersen (GER)
Lizelotte Wolter (NED)

== Ninth to tenth place classification ==
=== Ninth and tenth place ===
18 January 2026
09:00

| Ireland | 3–1 | Lithuania |
|---|---|---|
| Spence 5', 23'; Brown 37' | Report | Kuklienė 20' |

Umpires:
Lizelotte Wolter (NED)
Michael Gholami-Eilmer (AUT)

== Fifth to eighth place classification ==
=== Bracket ===
Semi-finals
17 January
Belgium | 2
Poland | 1
17 January
Ukraine | 5
Switzerland | 3

Fifth place
18 January
Belgium | 4
Ukraine | 3
Seventh place
18 January
Poland | 3
Switzerland | 4

=== Semi-finals ===
17 January 2026
16:30

| Belgium | 2−1 | Poland |
|---|---|---|
| Ronquetti 15'; De Mot 17' | Report | Katerla 9' |

Umpires:
Una Mihajlović (CRO)
Sarah Craig (IRL)

17 January 2026
17:55

| Ukraine | 5−3 | Switzerland |
|---|---|---|
| Leonova 6', 12'; Popova 10'; Korobkina 16'; Honcharenko 36' | Report | Zepf 33'; Härtsch 36'; Stomps 38' |

Umpires:
Lukasz Orzeł (POL)
Steven Bakker (NED)

=== Seventh and eighth place ===
18 January 2026
10:25

| Poland | 3–4 | Switzerland |
|---|---|---|
| Wochna 13', 15'; Czujewicz 22' | Report | Pöhler 10+', 27', 28'; Stomps 19' |

Umpires:
Sarah Craig (IRL)
Ana Faias (POR)

=== Fifth and sixth place ===
18 January 2026
11:50

| Belgium | 4–3 | Ukraine |
|---|---|---|
| De Mot 14', 38'; Barry 18'; Gose-Claessens 37' | Report | Leonova 4'; Popova 17'; Tanchenko 39' |

Umpires:
Manouk Bakker (NED)
Ole Ingwersen (GER)

== First to fourth place classification ==
=== Bracket ===
Semi-finals
17 January
Austria | 2 (1)
Czechia (s.o.) | 2 (2)
17 January
Spain | 5 (2)
Germany (s.o.) | 5 (3)

final
18 January
Czechia | 2
Germany | 5
third place
18 January
Austria | 3
Spain | 2

=== Semi-finals ===
17 January 2026
19:20

| Austria | 2−2 | Czechia |
|---|---|---|
| Buchleitner 16'; Czech 27' | Report | Babická 40'; Přibíková 40' |
Penalties
| Czech (penalty shoot-out scored); Kern (penalty shoot-out missed); Buchta (penalty shoot-out missed) | 1−2 | (penalty shoot-out missed) Hájková; (penalty shoot-out scored) Nováková; (penalty shoot-out scored) Laciná |

Umpires:
Ole Ingwersen (GER)
Lizelotte Wolter (NED)

17 January 2026
20:45

| Spain | 5−5 | Germany |
|---|---|---|
| Grau 3', 27'; Ycart 12'; Forte 27'; Carmona Ramos 36' | Report | Drumm 5', 34'; Gerstenhöfer 22', 32'; Scheuer 31' |
Penalties
| Ycart (penalty shoot-out scored); Carmona Ramos (penalty shoot-out scored); Grau (penalty shoot-out missed); Ycart (penalty shoot-out missed); Carmona Ramos (penalty shoot-out missed) | 2−3 | (penalty shoot-out scored) Gerstenhöfer; (penalty shoot-out missed) Drumm; (penalty shoot-out scored) Poppe; (penalty shoot-out missed) Gerstenhöfer; (penalty shoot-out scored) Poppe |

Umpires:
Michael Gholami-Eilmer (AUT)
Ana Faias (POR)

=== Third and fourth place ===
18 January 2026
13:15

| Austria | 3–2 | Spain |
|---|---|---|
| Buchleitner 3', 18'; Kern 40' | Report | Sola Gonzales 6'; Ycart 26' |

Umpires:
Una Mihajlović (CRO)
Lukasz Orzeł (POL)

=== Final ===
18 January 2026
14:40

| Czechia | 2–5 | Germany |
|---|---|---|
| Hájková 2'; Přibíková 40' | Report | Drumm 10'; Gerstenhöfer 17', 24'; Hendrix 32'; Poppe 39' |

Umpires:
Steven Bakker (NED)
Abby MacArthur (WAL)

== Final standings ==
| Pos | Team | Relegation |
|---|---|---|
| 1st place, gold medalist(s) | Germany | |
| 2nd place, silver medalist(s) | Czechia (H) | |
| 3rd place, bronze medalist(s) | Austria | |
| 4 | Spain | |
| 5 | Belgium | |
| 6 | Ukraine | |
| 7 | Switzerland | |
| 8 | Poland | |
| 9 | Ireland (R) | Relegation to the Indoor Championship II |
| 10 | Lithuania (R) | Relegation to the Indoor Championship II |

Source: FIH
(H) Host; (R) Relegated

== See also ==
- 2026 Men's EuroHockey Indoor Championship
