= 2018 Women's Indoor Hockey World Cup =

International indoor hockey tournament

Tournament details
- Host country: Germany
- City: Berlin
- Dates: 7–11 February
- Teams: 12 (from 5 confederations)
- Venue: Max-Schmeling-Halle

Final positions
- Champions: Germany (3rd title)
- Runner-up: Netherlands
- Third place: Belarus

Tournament statistics
- Matches played: 40
- Goals scored: 250 (6.25 per match)
- Top scorer(s): (Namibia) Kiana-Che Cormack (Ukraine) Yana Vorushylo (9 goals)
- Best player: (Germany) Lisa Hahn
- Best goalkeeper: (Netherlands) Alexandra Heerbaart

The 2018 Women's Indoor Hockey World Cup was the fifth edition of this tournament and played from 7 to 11 February 2018 in Berlin, Germany.

Germany defeated the Netherlands 2–1 in the final to win their third title, while Belarus secured their first medal.

== Qualification ==
Twelve teams participated in the tournament.

Host nation & Continental qualifiers
Dates	Event	Quotas	Qualifier(s)
18 January 2017	Host nation	1	Germany
24–28 April 2017	Asian Indoor Cup	1	Kazakhstan
23–25 June 2017	African Indoor Cup	1	Namibia
15–17 January 2016	European Nations Indoor Cup	1	Netherlands
	Oceania Indoor Qualification Tournament	1	Australia
16–21 October 2017	Pan American Indoor Cup	1	United States
Best six ranked teams from continental tournaments
Dates	Event	Quotas	Qualifier(s)
15–17 January 2016	European Nations Indoor Cup	6	Belarus; Czech Republic; Poland; Russia; Switzerland; Ukraine

== Umpires ==
12 umpires were appointed by the FIH for this tournament.

- Karine Alves (FRA)
- Vilma Bagdanskienė (LTU)
- Emily Carroll (AUS)
- Claire Druijts (NED)
- Elena Eskina (RUS)
- Ana Faias (POR)
- Maggie Giddens (USA)
- Ornpimol Kittiteerasopon (THA)
- Michelle Meister (GER)
- Gabriele Schmitz (GER)
- Rachel Williams (ENG)
- Sarah Wilson (SCO)

== Results ==
The schedule was released on 19 September 2017.

All times are local (UTC+1).

=== First round ===
==== Pool A ====
Pos	Team	Pld	W	D	L	GF	GA	GD	Pts	Qualification
1	Netherlands	5	5	0	0	28	10	+18	15	Quarterfinals
2	Belarus	5	4	0	1	20	7	+13	12	Quarterfinals
3	Switzerland	5	3	0	2	13	12	+1	9	Quarterfinals
4	Poland	5	1	1	3	10	11	−1	4	Quarterfinals
5	United States	5	1	1	3	14	18	−4	4	
6	Kazakhstan	5	0	0	5	3	30	−27	0	

Source: FIH
Rules for classification: 1) points; 2) goal difference; 3) goals scored; 4) head-to-head result.

7 February 2018
09:15

Poland	4–1	Kazakhstan
Katerla 4'; Sławińska 6'; Rybacha 22', 38'	Report	Sabazova 40+'

Umpires:
Gabriele Schmitz (GER)
Elena Eskina (RUS)

7 February 2018
10:10

Netherlands	5–2	Switzerland
L. van Wijk 5', 35'; Veen 10'; K. van Wijk 23', 29'	Report	S. Wälti 31', 40+'

Umpires:
Sarah Wilson (SCO)
Emily Carroll (AUS)

7 February 2018
10:25

Belarus	4–1	United States
Batura 16', 39'; Bahushevich 23'; Silitskaya 23'	Report	Barham 4'

Umpires:
Michelle Meister (GER)
Ornpimol Kittiteerasopon (THA)

7 February 2018
16:00

Poland	1–1	United States
Rybacha 15'	Report	Wirth 24'

Umpires:
Vilma Bagdanskienė (LTU)
Emily Carroll (AUS)

7 February 2018
16:15

Netherlands	7–0	Kazakhstan
Van Erk 9'; Zwinkels 10', 33'; Van Nes 29'; K. van Wijk 31'; De Baat 38', 39'	Report

Umpires:
Michelle Meister (GER)
Ana Faias (POR)

7 February 2018
17:10

Switzerland	1–5	Belarus
S. Wälti 36'	Report	Kurhanskaya 5'; Mikheichyk 18', 28'; Nikitsina 37'; Belavusava 39'

Umpires:
Rachel Williams (ENG)
Gabriele Schmitz (GER)

8 February 2018
09:15

Belarus	1–4	Netherlands
Syrayezhka 13'	Report	L. van Wijk 8', 39'; Van Nes 23'; Zwinkels 40'

Umpires:
Gabriele Schmitz (GER)
Vilma Bagdanskienė (LTU)

8 February 2018
10:10

United States	7–2	Kazakhstan
Zanolli 14', 20', 23'; Orobono 17'; Popper 29'; Barham 32'; Campbell 36'	Report	Gataulina 29'; Chepkassova 31'

Umpires:
Ana Faias (POR)
Claire Druijts (NED)

8 February 2018
10:25

Switzerland	3–1	Poland
S. Wälti 20'; Stomps 24'; Trösch 33'	Report	Rybacha 37'

Umpires:
Maggie Giddens (USA)
Emily Carroll (AUS)

8 February 2018
16:00

Poland	3–4	Netherlands
Rybacha 2', 31', 40'	Report	L. van Wijk 9'; Muyselaar 20+'; K. van Wijk 22'; Van Nes 36'

Umpires:
Ana Faias (POR)
Michelle Meister (GER)

8 February 2018
16:15

United States	1–3	Switzerland
Barham 40'	Report	S. Wälti 10'; Stomps 30'; A. Wälti 39'

Umpires:
Elena Eskina (RUS)
Karine Alves (FRA)

8 February 2018
17:10

Kazakhstan	0–8	Belarus
	Report	Mikheichyk 6', 31'; Batura 13'; Bahushevich 19', 37'; Silitskaya 20'; Kurhanskaya 27'; Papkova 35'

Umpires:
Ornpimol Kittiteerasopon (THA)
Rachel Williams (ENG)

9 February 2018
13:00

Netherlands	8–4	United States
Veen 2', 40'; Zwinkels 7', 16', 27'; L. van Wijk 22'; De Baat 25'; K. van Wijk 40'	Report	Zanolli 16', 40'; Barham 17', 34'

Umpires:
Vilma Bagdanskienė (LTU)
Elena Eskina (RUS)

9 February 2018
14:25

Kazakhstan	0–4	Switzerland
	Report	Bugmann 14'; A. Wälti 27'; S. Wälti 29'; Trösch 32'

Umpires:
Emily Carroll (AUS)
Michelle Meister (GER)

9 February 2018
15:35

Belarus	2–1	Poland
Mikheichyk 8'; Batura 34'	Report	Rybacha 11'

Umpires:
Ornpimol Kittiteerasopon (THA)
Maggie Giddens (USA)

==== Pool B ====
Pos	Team	Pld	W	D	L	GF	GA	GD	Pts	Qualification
1	Germany (H)	5	4	1	0	30	4	+26	13	Quarterfinals
2	Ukraine	5	3	0	2	14	17	−3	9	Quarterfinals
3	Australia	5	2	2	1	12	11	+1	8	Quarterfinals
4	Czech Republic	5	2	0	3	12	9	+3	6	Quarterfinals
5	Namibia	5	1	2	2	13	28	−15	5	
6	Russia	5	0	1	4	12	24	−12	1	

Source: FIH
Rules for classification: 1) points; 2) goal difference; 3) goals scored; 4) head-to-head result.
(H) Hosts

7 February 2018
09:00

Ukraine	4–3	Australia
Vorushylo 4', 32', 36'; Shevchenko 34'	Report	Gray 9'; Murphy 18'; Boucher 25'

Umpires:
Claire Druijts (NED)
Maggie Giddens (USA)

7 February 2018
11:20

Germany	8–1	Russia
Pieper 14'; Huse 17', 22'; Hauke 20', 35'; Mävers 26'; Hahn 31'; Schröder 39'	Report	Sadovaia 12'

Umpires:
Ana Faias (POR)
Rachel Williams (ENG)

7 February 2018
11:35

Czech Republic	6–2	Namibia
Lehovcová 2', 12', 17', 40'; Mejzlíková 14'; Capouchová 17'	Report	Cormack 26'; Venter 38'

Umpires:
Karine Alves (FRA)
Vilma Bagdanskienė (LTU)

7 February 2018
17:25

Czech Republic	1–2	Australia
Lehovcová 2'	Report	Farrell 3'; Watson 33'

Umpires:
Sarah Wilson (SCO)
Elena Eskina (RUS)

7 February 2018
18:20

Germany	12–0	Namibia
Müller-Wieland 9'; Schlenker 11'; Huse 15', 30'; Lorenz 18', 26'; Pieper 25'; Steindor 28', 39'; Hahn 29'; Hauke 32'; Schröder 40'	Report

Umpires:
Maggie Giddens (USA)
Ornpimol Kittiteerasopon (THA)

7 February 2018
18:35

Russia	4–6	Ukraine
Orlova 2'; Koroleva 16'; Eroshina 27'; Borisova 28'	Report	Ponomarenko 19', 29'; Khilko 20'; Vorushylo 22', 29'; Honcharenko 33'

Umpires:
Karine Alves (FRA)
Claire Druijts (NED)

8 February 2018
09:00

Russia	1–3	Czech Republic
Sadovaia 23'	Report	Haklová 11'; Lehovcová 20'; Laciná 37'

Umpires:
Michelle Meister (GER)
Rachel Williams (ENG)

8 February 2018
11:20

Ukraine	0–6	Germany
	Report	Lorenz 3'; Hauke 11', 38'; Hahn 22'; Schröder 22', 31'

Umpires:
Karine Alves (FRA)
Sarah Wilson (SCO)

8 February 2018
11:35

Australia	3–3	Namibia
Austin 10'; Gray 21'; Watson 28'	Report	Cormack 12', 24', 28'

Umpires:
Elena Eskina (RUS)
Ornpimol Kittiteerasopon (THA)

8 February 2018
17:25

Australia	2–1	Russia
Watson 20+', 27'	Report	Orlova 7'

Umpires:
Maggie Giddens (USA)
Sarah Wilson (SCO)

8 February 2018
18:20

Czech Republic	1–2	Germany
Haklová 32'	Report	Steindor 20'; Pieper 24'

Umpires:
Vilma Bagdanskienė (LTU)
Claire Druijts (NED)

8 February 2018
18:35

Namibia	3–2	Ukraine
Hermanus 6', 40+'; Cormack 37'	Report	Vorushylo 26'; Khilko 39'

Umpires:
Emily Carroll (AUS)
Gabriele Schmitz (GER)

9 February 2018
13:15

Ukraine	2–1	Czech Republic
Vorushylo 3'; Ponomarenko 26'	Report	Haklová 28'

Umpires:
Karine Alves (FRA)
Gabriele Schmitz (GER)

9 February 2018
14:10

Namibia	5–5	Russia
Hermanus 5'; Cormack 9', 22'; Mengo 29'; Boshoff 35'	Report	Borisova 20', 25'; Koroleva 23'; Sadovaia 34'; Eroshina 39'

Umpires:
Ana Faias (POR)
Claire Druijts (NED)

9 February 2018
15:20

Germany	2–2	Australia
Huse 16'; Schröder 30'	Report	Boucher 37'; Austin 40'

Umpires:
Sarah Wilson (SCO)
Rachel Williams (ENG)

=== Second round ===
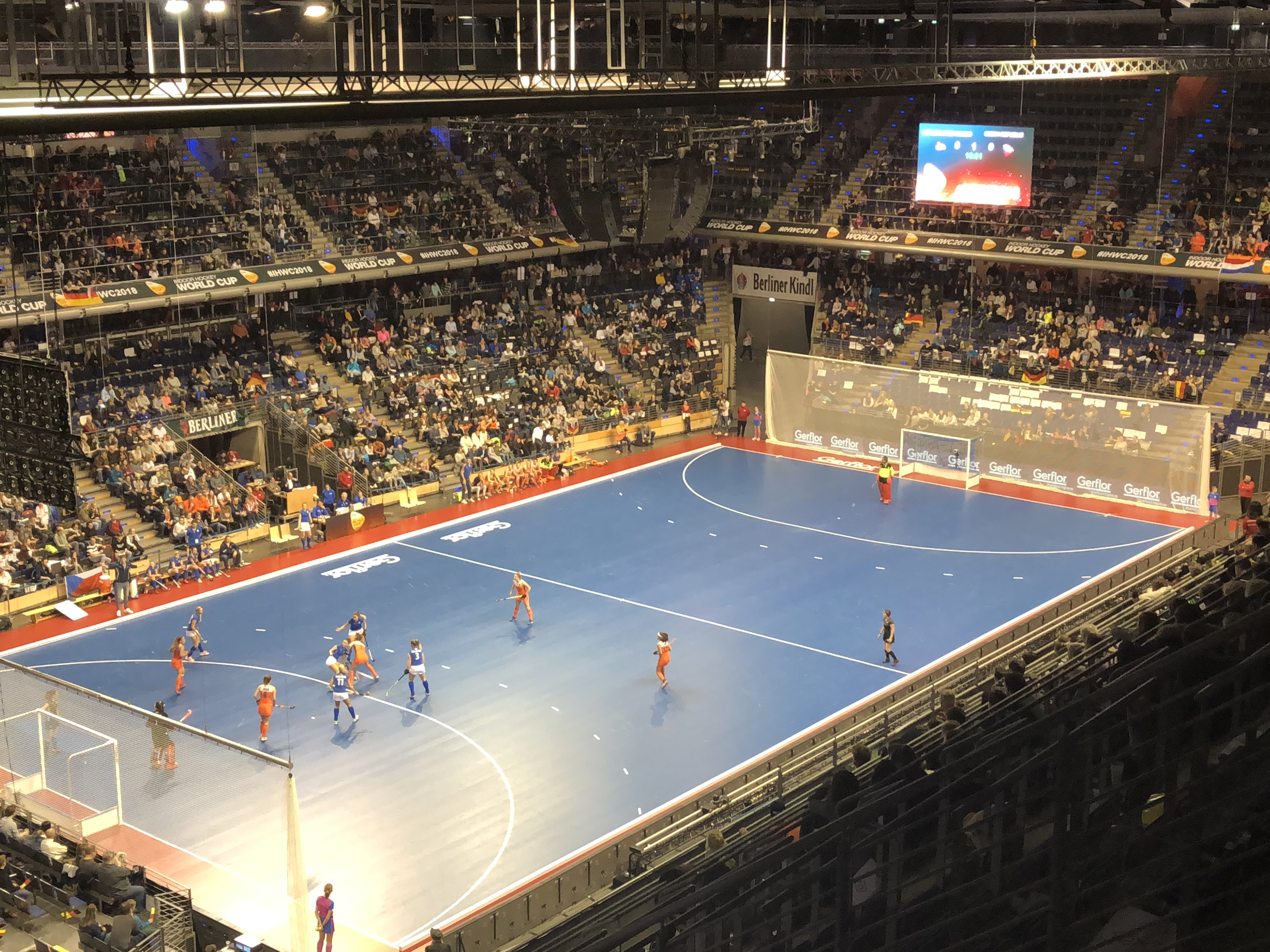
Quarterfinal: Netherlands vs. Czech Republic

Quarterfinals
10 February 2018
Netherlands	8
Czech Republic	3
10 February 2018
Ukraine	8
Switzerland	3
10 February 2018
Belarus	5
Australia	2
10 February 2018
Germany	3
Poland	1

Semifinals
10 February 2018
Netherlands	6
Ukraine	1
10 February 2018
Belarus	2
Germany	3

Final
11 February 2018
Netherlands	1
Germany	2
Third place game
11 February 2018
Ukraine	1
Belarus	2

==== Quarter-finals ====
10 February 2018
10:00

Belarus	5–2	Australia
Batura 3'; Mikheichyk 16'; Syrayezhka 23'; Nikitsina 29'; Kurhanskaya 36'	Report	Watson 13'; Somerville 20'

Umpires:
Michelle Meister (GER)
Vilma Bagdanskienė (LTU)

10 February 2018
11:30

Ukraine	8–3	Switzerland
Vorushylo 3', 20'; Khilko 17', 26', 30'; Shevchenko 28'; Shokalenko 32'; Stetsenko 36'	Report	S. Wälti 16', 18'; Haussener 38'

Umpires:
Rachel Williams (ENG)
Claire Druijts (NED)

10 February 2018
13:00

Germany	3–1	Poland
Hahn 13', 25'; Mävers 20'	Report	Walasek 22'

Umpires:
Sarah Wilson (SCO)
Karine Alves (FRA)

10 February 2018
14:30

Netherlands	8–3	Czech Republic
Mosch 9'; Van Erk 10', 15'; Van Nes 20', 39'; De Baat 35'; Veen 40'; K. Van Wijk 40'	Report	Capouchová 22'; Haklová 24'; Laciná 37'

Umpires:
Ana Faias (POR)
Elena Eskina (RUS)

==== Eleventh and twelfth place ====
10 February 2018
13:30

Kazakhstan	1–7	Russia
Domashneva 16'	Report	Eroshina 11'; Sadovaia 13'; Borisova 19', 26', 37'; Chepurnova 28'; Kolpakova 30'

Umpires:
Gabriele Schmitz (GER)
Maggie Giddens (USA)

==== Ninth and tenth place ====
10 February 2018
15:00

United States	5–5	Namibia
Orobono 7'; Barham 8', 37'; Campbell 13', 40'	Report	Mengo 4', 34'; Cormack 27', 36'; Boshoff 34'
Penalties
Pitcairn (penalty shoot-out missed); Zanolli (penalty shoot-out missed); Popper (penalty shoot-out missed)	0–1	(penalty shoot-out missed) Hermanus; (penalty shoot-out scored) Cormack

Umpires:
Emily Carroll (AUS)
Ornpimol Kittiteerasopon (THA)

==== First to fourth place classification ====
===== Semi-finals =====
10 February 2018
19:30

Netherlands	6–1	Ukraine
Roosen 4'; Zwinkels 7'; L. van Wijk 14'; Mosch 19'; Van Erk 28'; Van Nes 40'	Report	Shevchenko 40'

Umpires:
Michelle Meister (GER)
Ana Faias (POR)

10 February 2018
21:00

Belarus	2–3	Germany
Bahushevich 17'; Syrayezhka 36'	Report	Lorenz 2'; Hahn 21'; Mävers 29'

Umpires:
Rachel Williams (ENG)
Elena Eskina (RUS)

===== Third and fourth place =====
11 February 2018
10:30

Ukraine	1–2	Belarus
Ponomarenko 15'	Report	Kurhanskaya 18'; Nikitsina 33'

Umpires:
Claire Druijts (NED)
Karine Alves (FRA)

===== Final =====
11 February 2018
13:30

Netherlands	1–2	Germany
L. Van Wijk 26'	Report	Lorenz 29'; Schröder 32'

Umpires:
Vilma Bagdanskienė (LTU)
Sarah Wilson (SCO)

== Final standings ==
Rank	Team
Gold medal	Germany
Silver medal	Netherlands
Bronze medal	Belarus
4	Ukraine
5	Switzerland
6	Australia
7	Czech Republic
8	Poland
9	Namibia
10	United States
11	Russia
12	Kazakhstan

== Awards ==
Top Goalscorer	Player of the Tournament	Goalkeeper of the Tournament	Young Player of the Tournament
(Namibia) Kiana-Che Cormack (Ukraine) Yana Vorushylo	(Germany) Lisa Hahn	(Netherlands) Alexandra Heerbaart	(Germany) Nike Lorenz

== Goalscorers ==
There were 250 goals scored in 250 matches, for an average of 1 goal per match.

9 goals

- (Namibia) Kiana-Che Cormack
- (Ukraine) Yana Vorushylo

8 goals

- (Netherlands) Lieke van Wijk
- (Poland) Marlena Rybacha
- (Switzerland) Stephanie Wälti

7 goals

- (Netherlands) Donja Zwinkels
- (United States) Mary Barham

6 goals

- (Belarus) Yuliya Mikheichyk
- (Czech Republic) Adéla Lehovcová
- (Germany) Lisa Altenburg
- (Germany) Anne Schröder
- (Netherlands) Pien van Nes
- (Netherlands) Kiki van Wijk
- (Russia) Valeriia Borisova

5 goals

- (Australia) Shelley Watson
- (Belarus) Ryta Batura
- (Germany) Franzisca Hauke
- (Germany) Viktoria Huse
- (Germany) Nike Lorenz
- (Ukraine) Maryna Khilko
- (United States) Corinne Zanolli

4 goals

- (Belarus) Sviatlana Bahushevich
- (Belarus) Yuliya Kurhanskaya
- (Czech Republic) Barbora Haklova
- (Netherlands) Noor de Baat
- (Netherlands) Marijn Veen
- (Netherlands) Elin van Erk
- (Russia) Bogdana Sadovaia
- (Ukraine) Oksana Ponomarenko

3 goals

- (Belarus) Maryna Nikitsina
- (Belarus) Nastassia Syrayezhka
- (Germany) Marie Mävers
- (Germany) Cecile Pieper
- (Germany) Luisa Steindor
- (Namibia) Gillian Hermanus
- (Namibia) Magreth Mengo
- (Russia) Svetlana Eroshina
- (Ukraine) Yuliia Shevchenko
- (United States) Ali Campbell

2 goals

- (Australia) Lauren Austin
- (Australia) Tegan Boucher
- (Australia) Kyah Gray
- (Belarus) Nadzeya Silitskaya
- (Czech Republic) Renata Capouchova
- (Czech Republic) Kateřina Laciná
- (Namibia) Dure Boshoff
- (Netherlands) Gabrielle Mosch
- (Russia) Kseniia Koroleva
- (Russia) Antonina Orlova
- (Switzerland) Sofie Stomps
- (Switzerland) Tamara Trösch
- (Switzerland) Alexandra Wälti
- (United States) Madison Orobono

1 goal

- (Australia) Lisa Farrell
- (Australia) Madeleine Murphy
- (Australia) Karri Somerville
- (Belarus) Darya Belavusava
- (Belarus) Krestsina Papkova
- (Czech Republic) Tereza Mejzlikova
- (Germany) Janne Müller-wieland
- (Germany) Friderike Schlenker
- (Kazakhstan) Alissa Chepkassova
- (Kazakhstan) Vera Domashneva
- (Kazakhstan) Natalya Gataulina
- (Kazakhstan) Symbat Sabazova
- (Namibia) Marcia Venter
- (Netherlands) Mila Muyselaar
- (Netherlands) Fabienne Roosen
- (Poland) Amelia Katerla
- (Poland) Paula Slawinska
- (Poland) Oriana Walasek
- (Russia) Viktoriia Chepurnova
- (Russia) Anastasia Kolpakova
- (Switzerland) Karin Bugmann
- (Switzerland) Linda Haussener
- (Ukraine) Olha Honcharenko
- (Ukraine) Kateryna Shokalenko
- (Ukraine) Viktoriia Stetsenko
- (United States) Sammy Popper
- (United States) Paityn Wirth

Source: FIH
