= 2020 Women's EuroHockey Indoor Championship =

Women's indoor hockey competition

Tournament details
- Host country: Belarus
- City: Minsk
- Dates: 24–26 January 2020
- Teams: 8 (from 1 confederation)
- Venue: Minsk Sports Palace

Final positions
- Champions: Belarus (1st title)
- Runner-up: Netherlands
- Third place: Czech Republic

Tournament statistics
- Matches played: 20
- Goals scored: 122 (6.1 per match)
- Top scorer(s): (Belarus) Maryna Nikitsina (Czech Republic) Adéla Lehovcová (7 goals)
- Best player: (Netherlands) Donja Zwinkels

The 2020 Women's EuroHockey Indoor Nations Championship is the 20th edition of the tournament. It takes place from 24 to 26 January 2020 in Minsk, Belarus.

== Qualified Teams ==
The following teams, shown with pre-tournament world rankings, participated in the 2020 EuroHockey Indoor Championship.

Dates	Event	Location	Quotas	Qualifiers
19–21 January 2018	2018 EuroHockey Indoor Championship	Prague, Czech Republic	5	Belarus (3); Czech Republic (5); Germany (1); Netherlands (2); Switzerland (7); Ukraine (4)
19–21 January 2018	2018 EuroHockey Indoor Championship II	Brussels, Belgium	2	Austria (9); Belgium (14)
Total			8	

== Format ==
The eight teams are split into two groups of four teams. The top two teams advance to the semifinals to determine the winner in a knockout system. The bottom two teams play in a new group with the teams they did not play against in the group stage. The last two teams will be relegated to the EuroHockey Indoor Nations Championship II.

== Results ==
All times are local (UTC+3).

=== Preliminary round ===
==== Pool A ====
Pos	Team	Pld	W	D	L	GF	GA	GD	Pts	Qualification or relegation
1	Germany	3	3	0	0	15	7	+8	9	Advance to Semifinals
2	Czech Republic	3	2	0	1	10	9	+1	6	Advance to Semifinals
3	Ukraine	3	1	0	2	11	12	−1	3	Transfer to Pool C
4	Belgium	3	0	0	3	7	15	−8	0	Transfer to Pool C

Source: FIH
Rules for classification: 1) points; 2) goal difference; 3) goals scored; 4) head-to-head result.

24 January 2020
10:00

Ukraine	4–3	Belgium
Shevchenko 11', 35'; Honcharenko 15', 32'	Report	Wagemans 10'; Blockmans 24'; Closset 40'

Umpires:
Vilma Bagdanskiene (LTU)
Xenia Ulrich (AUT)

24 January 2020
11:15

Germany	4–1	Czech Republic
Martin-Pelegrina 18', 36'; Valentin 20'; Vivot 23'	Report	Lehovcová 26'

Umpires:
Lisette Baljon (NED)
Rachel Williams (ENG)

24 January 2020
16:00

Czech Republic	4–1	Belgium
Hájková 6'; Reichlová 25'; Laciná 35'; Lehovcová 37'	Report	Ronquetti 40'

Umpires:
Lisette Baljon (NED)
Ana Faias (POR)

24 January 2020
17:15

Ukraine	3–4	Germany
Kernoz 15'; Vorushylo 32'; Ponomarenko 33'	Report	Stöckel 13', 25'; Valentin 29', 37'

Umpires:
Vilma Bagdanskiene (LTU)
Rachel Williams (ENG)

25 January 2020
09:00

Czech Republic	5–4	Ukraine
Kolářová 13'; Lehovcová 30', 35'; Laciná 38', 40'	Report	Honcharenko 7', 39'; Kernoz 12'; Shokalenko 37'

Umpires:
Xenia Ulrich (AUT)
Gabriele Schmitz (GER)

25 January 2020
10:15

Germany	7–3	Belgium
Wenzel 7', 27'; Vivot 19'; Gerstenhöfer 19'; Martin-Pelegrina 30'; Valentin 31'; Kurz 40'	Report	Blockmans 4'; Closset 8'; Ronquetti 14'

Umpires:
Cathy Wright (WAL)
Lisette Baljon (NED)

==== Pool B ====
Pos	Team	Pld	W	D	L	GF	GA	GD	Pts	Qualification or relegation
1	Netherlands	3	3	0	0	14	1	+13	9	Advance to Semifinals
2	Belarus (H)	3	2	0	1	15	6	+9	6	Advance to Semifinals
3	Austria	3	1	0	2	8	14	−6	3	Transfer to Pool C
4	Switzerland	3	0	0	3	2	18	−16	0	Transfer to Pool C

Source: FIH
Rules for classification: 1) points; 2) goal difference; 3) goals scored; 4) head-to-head result.
(H) Hosts

24 January 2020
12:30

Belarus	7–2	Austria
Kurhanskaya 4', 12'; Filipovich 9'; Nikitsina 10', 38', 38', 39'	Report	Herzog 9'; Zerbs 35'

Umpires:
Gabriele Schmitz (GER)
Céline Martin-Schmets (BEL)

24 January 2020
13:45

Netherlands	5–0	Switzerland
De Baat 10', 34'; De Lange 31', 35'; Van Wijk 32'	Report

Umpires:
Cathy Wright (WAL)
Olena Klymenko (UKR)

24 January 2020
18:30

Switzerland	2–6	Austria
Trösch 10'; Stomps 31'	Report	Felber 2'; Steyrer 8', 16'; Zerbs 28', 35'; Herzog 34'

Umpires:
Olena Klymenko (UKR)
Gabriele Schmitz (GER)

24 January 2020
19:45

Belarus	1–4	Netherlands
Bahushevich 4'	Report	Post 1'; Van Erk 13'; Van Wijk 25'; Muyselaar 36'

Umpires:
Céline Martin-Schmets (BEL) (UKR)
Cathy Wright (WAL)

25 January 2020
11:30

Netherlands	5–0	Austria
Van Erk 5'; Zwinkels 11'; Van Hecking 18', 26'; Van Wijk 24'	Report

Umpires:
Ana Faias (POR)
Vilma Bagdanskiene (LTU)

25 January 2020
12:45

Switzerland	0–7	Belarus
	Report	Kurhanskaya 2'; Papkova 3'; Syddykava 7', 39'; Nikitsina 17'; Bahushevich 22'; Belavusava 31'

Umpires:
Rachel Williams (ENG)
Olena Klymenko (UKR)

=== Fifth to eighth place classification ===
==== Pool C ====
The points obtained in the preliminary round against the other team are taken over.

Pos	Team	Pld	W	D	L	GF	GA	GD	Pts	Relegation
1	Ukraine	3	3	0	0	14	6	+8	9	
2	Austria	3	2	0	1	10	7	+3	6	
3	Belgium	3	1	0	2	7	8	−1	3	EuroHockey Indoor Championship II
4	Switzerland	3	0	0	3	5	15	−10	0	EuroHockey Indoor Championship II

Source: FIH
Rules for classification: 1) points; 2) goal difference; 3) goals scored; 4) head-to-head result.

25 January 2020
16:45

Belgium	3–1	Switzerland
Ronquetti 2', 35'; Delforge 28'	Report	Trösch 39'

Umpires:
Xenia Ulrich (AUT)
Olena Klymenko (UKR)

25 January 2020
18:00

Ukraine	4–1	Austria
Kernoz 17', 27'; Vorushylo 18'; Ponomarenko 28'	Report	Buchta 10'

Umpires:
Ana Faias (POR)
Gabriele Schmitz (GER)

26 January 2020
10:00

Ukraine	6–2	Switzerland
Honcharenko 4'; Shevchenko 5'; Vorushylo 16'; Ponomarenko 20', 24'; Samokhodchenko 23'	Report	Wälti 33'; Triebold 39'

Umpires:
Vilma Bagdanskiene (LTU)
Ana Faias (POR)

26 January 2020
11:15

Austria	3–1	Belgium
Zerbs 19', 33'; Buchta 35'	Report	Blockmans 2'

Umpires:
Gabriele Schmitz (GER)
Rachel Williams (ENG)

=== First to fourth place classification ===
Semi-finals
25 January
Germany	2
Belarus	5
25 January
Netherlands	4
Czech Republic	2

Final
26 January
Belarus (s.o)	1 (4)
Netherlands	1 (3)
Third place
26 January
Germany	2 (1)
Czech Republic (s.o)	2 (2)

==== Semi-finals ====
25 January 2020
19:15

Germany	2–5	Belarus
Kurz 14'; Vivot 20'	Report	Nikitsina 2'; Filipovich 4'; Kurhanskaya 28'; Papkova 36', 37'

Umpires:
Cathy Wright (WAL)
Vilma Bagdanskiene (LTU)

25 January 2020
20:45

Netherlands	4–2	Czech Republic
De Lange 2'; Van Wijk 8', 22'; Post 10'	Report	Lehovcová 30', 39'

Umpires:
Rachel Williams (ENG)
Céline Martin-Schmets (BEL)

==== Third place game ====
26 January 2020
13:00

Germany	2–2	Czech Republic
Wenzel 11'; Gerstenhöfer 14'	Report	Laciná 2'; Lehovcová 24'
Penalties
Vivot (penalty shoot-out missed); Kurz (penalty shoot-out scored); Wenzel (penalty shoot-out missed)	1–2	(penalty shoot-out scored) Hájková; (penalty shoot-out missed) Lehovcová; (penalty shoot-out scored) Laciná

Umpires:
Lisette Baljon (NED)
Xenia Ulrich (AUT)

==== Final ====
26 January 2020
14:30

Belarus	1–1	Netherlands
Nikitsina 40+'	Report	Post 8'
Penalties
Papkova (penalty shoot-out missed); Nikitsina (penalty shoot-out scored); Kurhanskaya (penalty shoot-out scored); Kurhanskaya (penalty shoot-out missed); Papkova (penalty shoot-out scored); Nikitsina (penalty shoot-out scored)	4–3	(penalty shoot-out scored) Mosch; (penalty shoot-out missed) Muyselaar; (penalty shoot-out scored) Van Wijk; (penalty shoot-out missed) Van Wijk; (penalty shoot-out scored) Mosch; (penalty shoot-out missed) Muyselaar

Umpires:
Cathy Wright (WAL)
Céline Martin-Schmets (BEL)

== Statistics ==
=== Final standings ===
Pos	Team	Pld	W	D	L	GF	GA	GD	Pts	Relegation
1st place, gold medalist(s)	Belarus	5	3	1	1	21	9	+12	10	
2nd place, silver medalist(s)	Netherlands	5	4	1	0	19	4	+15	13	
3rd place, bronze medalist(s)	Czech Republic	5	2	1	2	14	15	−1	7	
4	Germany	5	3	1	1	19	14	+5	10	
5	Ukraine	5	3	0	2	21	15	+6	9	
6	Austria	5	2	0	3	12	19	−7	6	
7	Belgium	5	1	0	4	11	19	−8	3	EuroHockey Indoor Championship II
8	Switzerland	5	0	0	5	5	27	−22	0	EuroHockey Indoor Championship II

Source: FIH

=== Awards ===
Player of the Tournament	Top Goalscorer	Goalkeeper of the Tournament	Young Player of the Tournament
(Netherlands) Donja Zwinkels	(Belarus) Maryna Nikitsina (Czech Republic) Adéla Lehocová	(Czech Republic) Barbora Čecháková	(Netherlands) Noor de Baat

=== Goalscorers ===
There were 122 goals scored in 20 matches, for an average of 6.1 goals per match.

7 goals

- (Belarus) Maryna Nikitsina
- (Czech Republic) Adéla Lehovcová

5 goals

- (Austria) Corinna Zerbs
- (Netherlands) Lieke van Wijk
- (Ukraine) Olha Honcharenko

4 goals

- (Belarus) Yuliya Kurhanskaya
- (Belgium) Marie Ronquetti
- (Czech Republic) Kateřina Laciná
- (Germany) Hanna Valentin
- (Ukraine) Yevheniya Kernoz
- (Ukraine) Oksana Ponomarenko

3 goals

- (Belarus) Krestina Papkova
- (Belgium) Vanessa Blockmans
- (Germany) Teresa Martin-Pelegrina
- (Germany) Alisa Vivot
- (Germany) Benedetta Wenzel
- (Netherlands) Lisanne de Lange
- (Netherlands) Lisa Post
- (Ukraine) Yuliia Shevchenko
- (Ukraine) Yana Vorushylo

2 goals

- (Austria) Daria Buchta
- (Austria) Helene Herzog
- (Austria) Lisa Steyrer
- (Belarus) Sviatlana Bahushevich
- (Belarus) Yauheniya Filipovich
- (Belarus) Karyna Syddykava
- (Belgium) Céline Closset
- (Germany) Charlotte Gerstenhöfer
- (Germany) Stine Kurz
- (Germany) Lea Stöckel
- (Netherlands) Noor de Baat
- (Netherlands) Elin van Erk
- (Netherlands) Margot van Hecking
- (Switzerland) Tamara Trösch

1 goal

- (Austria) Fiona Felber
- (Belarus) Darya Belavusava
- (Belgium) Laurine Delforge
- (Belgium) Caroline Wagemans
- (Czech Republic) Natálie Hájková
- (Czech Republic) Anna Kolářová
- (Czech Republic) Jindriska Reichlová
- (Netherlands) Mila Muyselaar
- (Netherlands) Donja Zwinkels
- (Ukraine) Kateryna Samokhodchenko
- (Ukraine) Kateryna Shokalenko
- (Switzerland) Sofie Stomps
- (Switzerland) Raffaela Triebold
- (Switzerland) Stephanie Wälti

Source: FIH
