= 2014 Women's EuroHockey Junior Championship =

Tournament details
- Host country: Belgium
- City: Waterloo
- Dates: 20–26 July
- Teams: 8 (from 1 confederation)

Final positions
- Champions: Netherlands (9th title)
- Runner-up: Germany
- Third place: England

Tournament statistics
- Matches played: 20
- Goals scored: 95 (4.75 per match)
- Top scorer: (Netherlands) Lieke van Wijk (9 goals)

The 2014 Women's EuroHockey Junior Championship was the 17th edition of the Women's EuroHockey Junior Championship, a field hockey tournament. It was held in Waterloo, Belgium between 20 and 26 July 2014.

The tournament served as a qualifier for the 2016 Women's Hockey Junior World Cup, held in Santiago, Chile in November and December 2016.

Netherlands won the tournament by defeating Germany 2–0 in the final. England won the bronze medal by defeating Spain 2–0 in the third-place playoff.

== Participating nations ==
Alongside the host nation, 7 teams competed in the tournament.

- Belgium
- Czech Republic
- England
- France
- Germany
- Netherlands
- Russia
- Spain

== Results ==
=== Preliminary round ===
==== Pool A ====
Pos	Team	Pld	W	D	L	GF	GA	GD	Pts	Qualification
1	Netherlands	3	3	0	0	15	2	+13	9	Semi-finals
2	Germany	3	2	0	1	17	7	+10	6	Semi-finals
3	Belgium (H)	3	1	0	2	8	8	0	3	
4	Czech Republic	3	0	0	3	2	25	−23	0	

Source: FIH
Rules for classification: 1) points; 2) goal difference; 3) goals scored; 4) head-to-head result.
(H) Hosts

20 July 2014
14:30

Germany	12–1	Czech Republic
Valentin 8'; Schütze 9'; Hayn 11', 32', 62'; Tahal 15', 24', 64', 67'; Gräve 44'; Knuepfer 56', 60'	Report	Laciná 58'

Umpires:
Caroline Standfield (ENG)
Natalia Kadyrova (RUS)

20 July 2014
15:00

Netherlands	3–1	Belgium
Van der Plas 10'; De Lange 38'; Verschoor 57'	Report	Simons 40'

Umpires:
Alison Keogh (IRL)
Karine Alves (FRA)

21 July 2014
18:45

Germany	1–4	Netherlands
Saenger 50'	Report	Van Wijk 20', 25', 29', 66'

Umpires:
Alison Keogh (IRL)
Caroline Standfield (ENG)

21 July 2014
19:15

Belgium	5–1	Czech Republic
Puvrez 10', 17', 32'; Weyns 14'; Ronquetti 45'	Report	Laciná 58'

Umpires:
Nuria Ribó Cabistany (ESP)
Karine Alves (FRA)

23 July 2014
16:30

Netherlands	8–0	Czech Republic
Van Wijk 7', 22', 46'; Stam 9'; Nunnink 17'; Verschoor 23', 50'; Krekelaar 57'	Report

Umpires:
Natalia Kadyrova (RUS)
Nuria Ribó Cabistany (ESP)

23 July 2014
17:00

Belgium	2–4	Germany
Vanden Borre 10'; Weyns 68'	Report	Oruz 2'; Dudorov 25'; Stöckel 39'; Valentin 46'

Umpires:
Karine Alves (FRA)
Caroline Standfield (ENG)

==== Pool B ====
Pos	Team	Pld	W	D	L	GF	GA	GD	Pts	Qualification
1	England	3	2	0	1	5	2	+3	6	Semi-finals
2	Spain	3	2	0	1	4	3	+1	6	Semi-finals
3	Russia	3	1	0	2	7	8	−1	3	
4	France	3	1	0	2	4	7	−3	3	

Source: FIH
Rules for classification: 1) points; 2) goal difference; 3) goals scored; 4) head-to-head result.

20 July 2014
10:00

Spain	1–0	France
Salvatella 33'	Report

Umpires:
Sandra Wagner (GER)
Vilma Bagdanskiene (LTU)

20 July 2014
10:30

England	2–1	Russia
Addison 33'; Balsdon 45'	Report	Sazhina 9'

Umpires:
Alwiene Sterk (NED)
Magali Sergeant (BEL)

21 July 2014
16:30

France	4–3	Russia
Billore 4', 25', 56'; Huvelle 48'	Report	Sazhina 16', 51'; Kazakova 38'

Umpires:
Nicole Wajer (NED)
Vilma Bagdanskiene (LTU)

21 July 2014
17:00

England	0–1	Spain
	Report	García 2'

Umpires:
Sandra Wagner (GER)
Alwiene Sterk (NED)

23 July 2014
12:00

Spain	2–3	Russia
Pons 44'; Sánchez-Valverde 47'	Report	Sazhina 4'; Slozhneva 59', 62'

Umpires:
Magali Sergeant (BEL)
Sandra Wagner (GER)

23 July 2014
12:30

France	0–3	England
	Report	Defroand 25'; Leiper 52'; Hunt 56'

Umpires:
Vilma Bagdanskiene (LTU)
Alison Keogh (IRL)

=== Classification round ===
==== Pool C ====
Pos	Team	Pld	W	D	L	GF	GA	GD	Pts	Qualification
1	Belgium (H)	3	3	0	0	12	4	+8	9	
2	France	3	2	0	1	10	9	+1	6	
3	Czech Republic	3	1	0	2	8	11	−3	3	Relegated
4	Russia	3	0	0	3	6	12	−6	0	Relegated

Source: FIH
Rules for classification: 1) points; 2) goal difference; 3) goals scored; 4) head-to-head result.
(H) Hosts

24 July 2014
16:30

Czech Republic	3–4	France
Jelínková 17'; Vorlová 40'; Laciná 63'	Report	Vankemmel 6'; Huvelle 12'; Couteau 18'; Billore 70+'

Umpires:
Natalia Kadyrova (RUS)
Nuria Ribó Cabistany (ESP)

24 July 2014
19:00

Belgium	4–1	Russia
Dauw 2'; Simons 56'; Puvrez 58'; Duquesne 68'	Report	Vavilova 35+'

Umpires:
Nicole Wajer (NED)
Alwiene Sterk (NED)

26 July 2014
18:30

Czech Republic	4–2	Russia
Tlaskakova 6'; Decsyová 54'; Hanzlová 60', 65'	Report	Slozhneva 34', 45'

Umpires:
Nuria Ribó Cabistany (ESP)
Alwiene Sterk (NED)

26 July 2014
09:00

Belgium	3–2	France
Wouters 26', 35+'; Simons 29'	Report	Lauret 24'; Blondel 68'

Umpires:
Nicole Wajer (NED)
Sandra Wagner (GER)

==== First to fourth place classification ====
Semi-finals
24 July
Germany	2
England	1
24 July
Netherlands	3
Spain	0

Final
26 July
Germany	0
Netherlands	2
Third place
26 July
England	2
Spain	0

===== Semi-finals =====
24 July 2014
17:00

Germany	2–1	England
Kneupfer 2'; Oruz 6'	Report	Defroand 41'

Umpires:
Magali Sergeant (BEL)
Vilma Bagdanskiene (LTU)

24 July 2014
19:30

Netherlands	3–0	Spain
De Lange 19'; Van Ramshorst 60'; Van Wijk 70+'	Report

Umpires:
Caroline Standfield (ENG)
Karine Alves (RUS)

===== Third and fourth place =====
26 July 2014
13:30

England	2–0	Spain
Leigh 31', 67'	Report

Umpires:
Alison Keogh (IRL)
Karine Alves (RUS)

===== Final =====
26 July 2014
15:30

Germany	0–2	Netherlands
	Report	Van Wijk 10'; De Ruiter 18'

Umpires:
Vilma Bagdanskiene (LTU)
Caroline Standfield (ENG)

== Final standings ==
As per statistical convention in field hockey, matches decided in extra time are counted as wins and losses, while matches decided by penalty shoot-outs are counted as draws.

Pos	Team	Pld	W	D	L	GF	GA	GD	Pts	Status
1st place, gold medalist(s)	Netherlands	5	5	0	0	20	2	+18	15	Qualified for 2016 FIH Junior World Cup
2nd place, silver medalist(s)	Germany	5	3	0	2	19	10	+9	9	Qualified for 2016 FIH Junior World Cup
3rd place, bronze medalist(s)	England	5	3	0	2	8	4	+4	9	Qualified for 2016 FIH Junior World Cup
4	Spain	5	2	0	3	4	8	−4	6	Qualified for 2016 FIH Junior World Cup
5	Belgium (H)	5	3	0	2	15	11	+4	9	Qualified for 2016 FIH Junior World Cup
6	France	5	2	0	3	10	13	−3	6	
7	Russia	5	1	0	4	10	16	−6	3	Relegated to EuroHockey Junior Championship II
8	Czech Republic	5	1	0	4	9	31	−22	3	Relegated to EuroHockey Junior Championship II

Source: FIH
(H) Hosts

== See also ==
- 2014 Men's EuroHockey Junior Championship
