= Lisanne de Lange =

Dutch field hockey player

Personal information
- Full name: Lisanne Rosalie Desiree de Lange
- Born: 31 March 1994 (age 32) Utrecht, Netherlands

Sport
- Sport: Field hockey
- Position: Forward
Senior career
Years	Team	Caps	Goals
2012–2020	Laren	-	-
2020–2022	Pinoké	-	-
National team
Years	Team	Caps	Goals
2013–2014	Netherlands U–21	15	(9)
2013–2018	Netherlands	11	(0)
2016–2020	Netherlands Indoor	10	(7)
Medal record
Women's field hockey
Women's Indoor Hockey
Gold medal – first place	Laren (2018/2020)	Pinoké (2023)
Representing Netherlands
FIH World League
Gold medal – first place	2012–13 Tucumán	Team
FIH Junior World Cup
Gold medal – first place	2013 Mönchengladbach	Team
European Junior Championship
Gold medal – first place	2014 Waterloo	Team
Women's indoor hockey
European Indoor Championship
Gold medal – first place	2016 Minsk	Team
Silver medal – second place	2020 Minsk	Team

Lisanne Rosalie Desiree de Lange (born 31 March 1994) is a field hockey and indoor hockey player from the Netherlands, who plays as a forward.

== Personal life ==
Lisanne de Lange studied law at the Utrecht University.

== Career ==
=== Club hockey ===
In the Dutch Hoofdklasse, de Lange played club hockey until 2020 for Laren. With Laren she won the Hoofdklasse Indoor Hockey in both 2018 and 2020. From the 2020 season she played 2 more years for Pinoké, after which she stopped playing at the highest level. In the 2022–2023 season, de Lange was still active indoor, where she became again Hoofdklasse Indoor Hockey champion of the Netherlands together with Pinoké.

=== National teams ===
==== Under–21 ====
Lisanne de Lange made her debut for the Netherlands U–21 in 2013 at the FIH Junior World Cup in Mönchengladbach. She also represented the team at the 2014 EuroHockey Junior Championship in Waterloo. She won gold medals at both events.

==== Indoor ====
In 2016 and 2020, de Lange was a member of the Netherlands Indoor team at the Women's EuroHockey Indoor Championship. Both events were hosted in Minsk, with the team winning gold and silver, respectively.

==== Oranje Dames ====
In 2013, de Lange was a member of the Netherlands senior national team at the 2012–13 FIH World League Final in San Miguel de Tucumán. De Lange won a gold medal at the event; her only major tournament with the senior team.
