= Marlena Rybacha =

Polish field hockey player (born 1987)

Personal information
- Born: 16 September 1987 (age 38) Nysa, Poland

Sport
- Sport: Field hockey
- Position: Defender
- Club: Oranje-Rood
National team
Years	Team	Caps	Goals
–	Poland	95	-
Medal record
Representing Poland
Women's field hockey
Hockey5s World Cup
Bronze medal – third place	2024 Oman
Women's indoor hockey
FIH Indoor World Cup
Gold medal – first place	2025 Poreč
EuroHockey Indoor Championship
Bronze medal – third place	2013 Prague

Marlena Rybacha (born 16 September 1987) is a Polish field hockey player. She is the current captain of both the Poland national indoor and outdoor teams.

== Personal life ==
Marlena Rybacha was born and raised in Nysa, Poland. She began playing hockey at age 11 in a team coached by her aunt. Rybacha currently resides in Den Bosch in the Netherlands, and plays for Dutch club HC Oranje-Rood.

Rybacha has a master's degree in physical education, which she achieved at AWF in Poznań.

== Club career ==
Before transitioning to HC Oranje-Rood, Rybacha played for fellow Dutch club MOP Vught.

== International career ==
Rybacha has played in three Indoor World Cups; 2011 in Poznań, 2015 in Leipzig and 2018 in Berlin.

In 2019, Rybacha was named in the Poland squad for the FIH Series Finals in Hiroshima, Japan.
