= Marijn Veen =

Dutch field hockey player

Personal information
- Full name: Marijn Anne Elise Veen
- Born: 18 November 1996 (age 29) Utrecht, Netherlands

Sport
- Sport: Field hockey
- Position: Forward
- Club: Amsterdam
Senior career
Years	Team	Caps	Goals
–2017	Kampong	-	-
2017–	Amsterdam	-	-
National team
Years	Team	Caps	Goals
2015–2017	Netherlands U–21	11	(7)
2016–	Netherlands Indoor	18	(8)
2018–	Netherlands	23	(11)
Medal record
Representing Netherlands
Women's field hockey
Olympic Games
Gold medal – first place	2024 Paris	Team
World Cup
Silver medal – second place	2026 Wavre/Amstelveen
European Championship
Gold medal – first place	2019 Antwerp
Gold medal – first place	2023 Mönchengladbach
Gold medal – first place	2025 Mönchengladbach
FIH Pro League
Gold medal – first place	2019 Amstelveen
Champions Trophy
Gold medal – first place	2018 Changzhou	Team
EuroHockey Junior Championship
Gold medal – first place	2017 Valencia
Women's indoor hockey
Indoor World Cup
Silver medal – second place	2018 Berlin
EuroHockey Indoor Championship
Gold medal – first place	2016 Minsk
Silver medal – second place	2018 Prague
Women's hockey5s
Youth Olympic Games
Silver medal – second place	2014 Nanjing	Team

Marijn Anne Elise Veen (born 18 November 1996) is a Dutch field hockey player who plays as a forward.

== Personal life ==
Marijn Veen was born and raised in Utrecht, Netherlands.

== Career ==
=== Club hockey ===
Veen played for Kampong until 2017 when she transferred to Amsterdam.

=== National teams ===
==== Indoor ====
In 2016 and 2018, Veen was a member of the Netherlands Indoor team at the EuroHockey Indoor Nations Championship in Minsk and Prague, winning gold and silver medals respectively.

She followed this up with a silver medal at the 2018 Indoor World Cup in Berlin.

==== Under–18 and Under–21 ====
Veen was part of the Netherlands U–18 Team at the 2014 Summer Youth Olympics where the team finished second, losing to China in the final.

From 2015 to 2017, Veen was a member of the Netherlands U–21 team. She captained the team to a gold medal at the 2017 EuroHockey Junior Championship in Valencia.

==== Oranje Dames ====
Veen made her senior international debut in November 2018 at the Champions Trophy. She scored two goals in her debut, in a 3–1 win against Japan.

In 2019, Veen won two gold medals with the national team; at the Grand Final of the FIH Pro League in Amstelveen and at the EuroHockey Nations Championship in Antwerp.

=== International goals ===
Goal	Date	Location	Opponent	Score	Result	Competition	Ref.
1	17 November 2018	Wujin Hockey Stadium, Changzhou, China	Japan	1–1	3–1	2018 Champions Trophy	
2	17 November 2018	Wujin Hockey Stadium, Changzhou, China	Japan	3–1	3–1	2018 Champions Trophy	
3	20 November 2018	Wujin Hockey Stadium, Changzhou, China	Australia	1–0	3–0	2018 Champions Trophy	
4	22 November 2018	Wujin Hockey Stadium, Changzhou, China	Great Britain	1–0	4–0	2018 Champions Trophy	
5	24 November 2018	Wujin Hockey Stadium, Changzhou, China	China	2–0	2–1	2018 Champions Trophy	
6	10 April 2019	De Klapperboom, Utrecht, Netherlands	China	5–0	6–0	2019 FIH Pro League	
7	1 June 2019	Sportpark Aalsterweg, Eindhoven, Netherlands	Great Britain	2–0	2–0	2019 FIH Pro League	
8	29 June 2019	Wagener Stadium, Amstelveen, Netherlands	Australia	1–1	2–2	2019 FIH Pro League	
9	29 July 2019	Yamanashi Gakuin Hockey Stadium, Kōfu, Japan	Japan	1–1	3–1	Test Match	
10	21 August 2019	Wilrijkse Plein, Antwerp, Belgium	Russia	7–0	14–0	2019 EuroHockey Championship	
11	21 August 2019	Wilrijkse Plein, Antwerp, Belgium	Russia	13–0	14–0	2019 EuroHockey Championship	
