= 2014 Women's EuroHockey Indoor Championship =

Tournament details
- Host country: Czech Republic
- City: Prague
- Dates: 24–26 January
- Teams: 8 (from 1 confederation)
- Venue: Sparta Arena

Final positions
- Champions: Netherlands (1st title)
- Runner-up: Germany
- Third place: Poland

Tournament statistics
- Matches played: 20
- Goals scored: 129 (6.45 per match)
- Top scorer(s): (Germany) Lydia Haase (Poland) Paula Okaj (7 goals)
- Best player: (Germany) Julia Müller

The 2014 Women's EuroHockey Indoor Championship was the seventeenth edition of the Women's EuroHockey Indoor Championship, the biennial international women's indoor hockey championship of Europe organized by the European Hockey Federation. It was held from 24 to 26 January 2018 in Prague, Czech Republic.

The Netherlands won the tournament for the first time after defeating Germany 3–0 in the final.

The two bottom ranked teams of the tournament were relegated to the 2016 EuroHockey Indoor Nations Championship II.

== Qualified teams ==
The following teams participated in the 2014 EuroHockey Indoor Nations Championship.

Dates	Event	Location	Quotas	Qualifiers
13–15 January 2012	2012 EuroHockey Indoor Championship	Leipzig, Germany	5	Austria; Belarus; Czech Republic; Germany; Netherlands; Poland
20–22 January 2012	2012 EuroHockey Indoor Championship II	Slagelse, Denmark	2	England; France
Total			8	

== Results ==
=== Preliminary round ===
==== Pool A ====
Pos	Team	Pld	W	D	L	GF	GA	GD	Pts	Qualification
1	Netherlands	3	2	0	1	18	9	+9	6	Semi-finals
2	Germany	3	2	0	1	20	12	+8	6	Semi-finals
3	Czech Republic (H)	3	2	0	1	8	13	−5	6	Relegation pool
4	England	3	0	0	3	4	16	−12	0	Relegation pool

Source: FIH
Rules for classification: 1) points; 2) goal difference; 3) goals scored; 4) head-to-head result.
(H) Hosts

24 January 2014
12:50

Netherlands	7–0	England
Den Ouden 5'; D'Escury 20+'; Vorstenbosch 23'; Leurink 25', 34'; Van Nes 31'; Hulsen 37'	Report

Umpires:
Elena Eskina (RUS)
Gabriele Schmitz (GER)

24 January 2014
14:00

Germany	10–0	Czech Republic
Jacobi 3'; Müller 14', 23', 37'; Hillmann 19', 35'; Haase 25'; Hasselmann 26'; Dudurov 29', 39'	Report

Umpires:
Dino Willox (WAL)
Fanneke Alkemade (NED)

24 January 2014
17:50

Netherlands	9–5	Germany
Van Nes 5', 23', 36'; Zwinkels 11', 40+'; Hulsen 14'; Vorstenbosch 16', 21'; Admiraal 18'	Report	Müller 4'; Haase 20+', 38', 39'; Hillmann 35'

Umpires:
Frances Block (ENG)
Dino Willox (WAL)

24 January 2014
19:00

Czech Republic	4–1	England
Laciná 8'; Haklová 14'; Bížová 18'; T. Mejzlíková 32'	Report	Haycroft 32'

Umpires:
Elena Eskina (RUS)
Fanneke Alkemade (NED)

25 January 2014
11:20

Germany	5–3	England
Haase 4', 23', 39'; Hillmann 5'; Jacobi 29'	Report	Bray 20+'; Ansley 26'; Owsley 32'

Umpires:
Tatiana Chojnacka (POL)
Sabine Billing (AUT)

24 January 2014
12:30

Czech Republic	4–2	Netherlands
Bížová 3', 5'; T. Mejzlíková 12'; Laciná 15'	Report	D'Escury 21'; Admiraal 34'

Umpires:
Karine Alves (FRA)
Elena Eskina (RUS)

==== Pool B ====
Pos	Team	Pld	W	D	L	GF	GA	GD	Pts	Qualification
1	Austria	3	2	1	0	12	6	+6	7	Semi-finals
2	Poland	3	1	1	1	9	7	+2	4	Semi-finals
3	Belarus	3	1	1	1	12	12	0	4	Relegation pool
4	France	3	0	1	2	9	17	−8	1	Relegation pool

Source: FIH
Rules for classification: 1) points; 2) goal difference; 3) goals scored; 4) head-to-head result.

24 January 2014
10:30

Belarus	2–3	Austria
Mikheichyk 5'; Silitskaya 32'	Report	Balek 4', 27'; Zerbs 15'

Umpires:
Frances Block (ENG)
Karine Alves (FRA)

24 January 2014
11:40

Poland	4–1	France
Okaj 9', 36', 40+'; Wałasek 38'	Report	Dutel 39'

Umpires:
Helena Babičká (CZE)
Liudmila Aleinikoveine (BLR)

24 January 2014
15:30

Austria	7–2	France
Busch 10', 12'; Zerbs 20+', 32', 34'; Lenzinger 21'; Balek 38'	Report	Durachta 16'; Minet 36'

Umpires:
Tatiana Chojnacka (POL)
Gabriele Schmitz (GER)

24 January 2014
16:40

Poland	3–4	Belarus
Wieloch 4'; Okaj 6'; Sławińska 34'	Report	Mikheichyk 1', 12'; Kulinkovich 24'; Shyntar 31'

Umpires:
Sabine Billing (AUT)
Karine Alves (FRA)

25 January 2014
09:00

Belarus	6–6	France
Bahushevich 7', 13'; Shyntar 26', 40+'; Mikheichyk 37'; Silitskaya 40+'	Report	Minet 3'; Begue 8'; Durachta 10', 20+'; Dutel 27', 37'

Umpires:
Helena Babičká (CZE)
Fanneke Alkemade (NED)

25 January 2014
10:10

Austria	2–2	Poland
Balek 16'; Zerbs 18'	Report	Okaj 8'; Sławińska 26'

Umpires:
Liudmila Aleinikoveine (BLR)
Gabriele Schmitz (GER)

=== Fifth to eighth place classification ===
==== Pool C ====
The points obtained in the preliminary round against the other team are taken over.

Pos	Team	Pld	W	D	L	GF	GA	GD	Pts	Relegation
5	Czech Republic (H)	3	2	1	0	10	6	+4	7	
6	Belarus	3	1	2	0	14	13	+1	5	
7	England	3	1	0	2	7	8	−1	3	EuroHockey Indoor Championship II
8	France	3	0	1	2	7	11	−4	1	EuroHockey Indoor Championship II

Source: FIH
Rules for classification: 1) points; 2) goal difference; 3) goals scored; 4) head-to-head result.
(H) Hosts

25 January 2014
15:30

England	3–0	France
Bray 10', 20+', 40+'	Report

Umpires:
Dino Willox (WAL)
Sabine Billing (AUT)

25 January 2014
16:40

Czech Republic	4–4	Belarus
Bížová 4'; Háklová 8'; A. Mejzlíková 20+'; Laciná 26'	Report	Kulinkovich 5', 6'; Shyntar 19', 27'

Umpires:
Frances Block (ENG)
Karine Alves (FRA)

26 January 2014
10:00

England	3–4	Belarus
Ansley 9', 13'; Haycroft 35'	Report	Kulinkovich 5'; Mazyrka 14'; Shyntar 18'; Mikheichyk 38'

Umpires:
Dino Willox (WAL)
Gabriele Schmitz (GER)

26 January 2014
11:10

Czech Republic	2–1	France
A. Mejzlíková 35'; Laciná 40+'	Report	Billore 31'

Umpires:
Sabine Billing (AUT)
Fanneke Alkemade (NED)

=== First to fourth place classification ===
Semi-finals
25 January
Netherlands (s.o)	2 (1)
Poland	2 (0)
25 January
Austria	1
Germany	5

Final
26 January
Netherlands	3
Germany	0
Third place
26 January
Poland	2
Austria	1

==== Semi-finals ====
25 January 2014
17:50

Austria	1–5	Germany
Zerbs 15'	Report	Hillman 34'; Teschke 17', 33'; Hasselmann 34'; Dudorov 38'

Umpires:
Liudmila Aleinikoviene (BLR)
Elena Eskina (RUS)

25 January 2014
19:15

Netherlands	2–2	Poland
Leurink 3', 39'	Report	Okaj 8'; Wittke 11'
Penalties
Leurink (penalty shoot-out scored); D'Escury (penalty shoot-out missed)	1–0	(penalty shoot-out missed) Sławińska; (penalty shoot-out missed) Rybacha; (penalty shoot-out missed) Okaj

Umpires:
Gabriele Schmitz (GER)
Helena Babičká (CZE)

==== Third place game ====
26 January 2014
13:00

Poland	2–1	Austria
Okaj 7'; Sławińska 30'	Report	Balek 20'

Umpires:
Liudmila Aleinikoviene (BLR)
Helena Babičká (CZE)

==== Final ====
26 January 2014
14:30

Netherlands	3–0	Germany
Van Nes 18'; Zwinkels 25'; Vorstenbosch 31'	Report

Umpires:
France Block (ENG)
Elena Eskina (RUS)

== Statistics ==
=== Final standings ===
Pos	Team	Relegation
1st place, gold medalist(s)	Netherlands	
2nd place, silver medalist(s)	Germany	
3rd place, bronze medalist(s)	Poland	
4	Austria	
5	Czech Republic (H)	
6	Belarus	
7	England	EuroHockey Indoor Championship II
8	France	EuroHockey Indoor Championship II

Source: FIH
(H) Host

=== Awards ===
Player of the Tournament	Top Goalscorer	Goalkeeper of the Tournament
(Germany) Julia Müller	(Germany) Lydia Haase (Poland) Paula Okaj	(Czech Republic) Barbora Čecháková

=== Goalscorers ===
There were 129 goals scored in 20 matches, for an average of 6.45 goals per match.

7 goals

- (Germany) Lydia Haase
- (Poland) Paula Okaj

6 goals

- (Austria) Corinna Zerbs
- (Belarus) Volha Shyntar

5 goals

- (Austria) Irene Balek
- (Belarus) Yuliya Mikheichyk
- (Germany) Kristina Hillmann
- (Netherlands) Pien van Nes

4 goals

- (Belarus) Krestina Kulinkovich
- (Czech Republic) Adéla Bizová
- (Czech Republic) Kateřina Laciná
- (England) Sophie Bray
- (Germany) Julia Müller
- (Netherlands) Laurien Leurink
- (Netherlands) Vera Vorstenbosch

3 goals

- (England) Giselle Ansley
- (France) Carolia Durachta
- (France) Gwenaelle Dutel
- (Germany) Julia Dudurov
- (Netherlands) Donja Zwinkels
- (Poland) Paula Sławińska

2 goals

- (Austria) Julia Busch
- (Belarus) Sviatlana Bahushevich
- (Belarus) Nadzeya Silitskaya
- (Czech Republic) Bárbora Háklová
- (Czech Republic) Adéla Mejzlíková
- (Czech Republic) Tereza Mejzlíková
- (England) Sarah Haycroft
- (France) Alicia Minet
- (Germany) Nina Hasselmann
- (Germany) Lena Jacobi
- (Germany) Jana Teschke
- (Netherlands) Denise Admiraal
- (Netherlands) Kiki Collot D'Escury
- (Netherlands) Lieke Hulsen

1 goal

- (Austria) Catherine Lenzinger
- (Belarus) Natalia Mazyrka
- (England) Lily Owsley
- (France) Emilie Begue
- (France) Marie Billore
- (Netherlands) Karin den Ouden
- (Poland) Oriana Wałasek
- (Poland) Joanna Wieloch
- (Poland) Joanna Wittke

Source: FIH

== See also ==
- 2014 Men's EuroHockey Indoor Championship
- 2014 Women's EuroHockey Indoor Championship II
