= 2018 Women's EuroHockey Indoor Championship =

2018 Women's EuroHockey Indoor Nations Championship
Tournament details
- Host country: Czech Republic
- City: Prague
- Dates: 19–21 January
- Teams: 8
- Venue: Arena Sparta

Final positions
- Champions: Germany (15th title)
- Runner-up: Netherlands
- Third place: Belarus

Tournament statistics
- Matches played: 20
- Goals scored: 122 (6.1 per match)
- Top scorer: (Russia) Valeriia Borisova (10 goals)

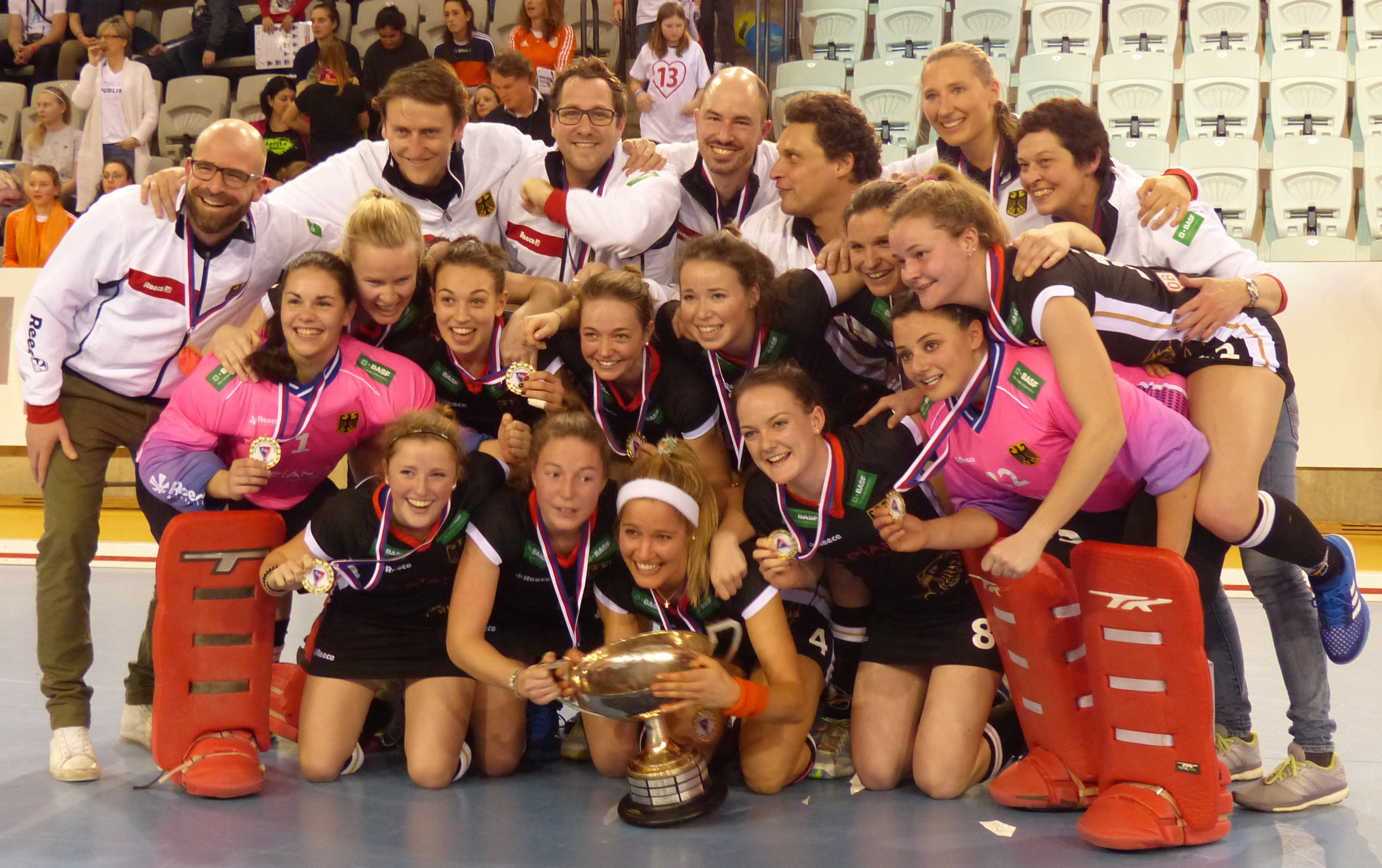
Photo of the winning team 2018 Women's EuroHockey Indoor Nations Championship in Prague

The 2018 Women's EuroHockey Indoor Nations Championship was the 19th edition of the tournament. It took place from 19 to 21 January 2018 in Prague, Czech Republic.

== Teams ==
- Belarus
- Czech Republic
- Germany
- Netherlands
- Poland
- Russia
- Switzerland
- Ukraine

== Umpires ==
- Frances Block (ENG)
- Celine Martin-Schmets (UKR)
- Xenia Ulrich (NED)
- Anastasia Bogolyubova (RUS)
- Tara Browne (IRL)
- Sviatlana Karzhevich (BLR)
- Daniela Kavanova (CZE)
- Olena Klymenko (UKR)
- Alwiene Sterk (NED)
- Sandra Wagner (GER)

== Results ==
All times are local (UTC+1).

=== Preliminary round ===
==== Pool A ====
Pos	Team	Pld	W	D	L	GF	GA	GD	Pts	Qualification
1	Netherlands	3	2	0	1	13	6	+7	6	Advanced to Semi-finals
2	Belarus	3	2	0	1	13	10	+3	6	Advanced to Semi-finals
3	Switzerland	3	2	0	1	6	9	−3	6	
4	Poland	3	0	0	3	4	11	−7	0	

Source: FIH
Rules for classification: 1) points; 2) goal difference; 3) goals scored; 4) head-to-head result.

19 January 2018
10:00

Poland	1–2	Switzerland
Katerla 8'	Report	Trösch 26'; S. Wälti 28'

Umpires:
Olena Klymenko (UKR)
Xenia Ulrich (NED)

19 January 2018
11:10

Netherlands	7–2	Belarus
Van Nes 3', 22'; Van Erk 5'; Albers 7', 8'; Zwinkels 21'; Van Laarhoven 40'	Report	Papkova 24'; Mikheichyk 40'

Umpires:
Frances Block (ENG)
Daniela Kavanova (CZE)

19 January 2018
16:00

Belarus	6–1	Switzerland
Bahushevich 4'; Batura 18'; Syrayezhka 25'; Mikheichyk 27', 32'; Mihunova 40'	Report	S. Wälti 37'

Umpires:
Alwiene Sterk (NED)
Tara Browne (IRL)

19 January 2018
17:10

Poland	1–4	Netherlands
Walasek 38'	Report	Van Nes 6'; Zwinkels 14', 23'; Van der Hoek 19'

Umpires:
Celine Martin-Schmets (UKR)
Anastasia Bogolyubova (RUS)

20 January 2018
09:00

Netherlands	2–3	Switzerland
Muyselaar 20+'; Albers 34'	Report	S. Wälti 8', 22'; Bugmann 36'

Umpires:
Sviatlana Karzhevich (BLR)
Xenia Ulrich (NED)

20 January 2018
10:10

Belarus	5–2	Poland
Mikheichyk 10'; Silitskaya 19'; Nikitsina 27'; Syrayezhka 37'; Papkova 40'	Report	Grotek 34'; Wieloch 39'

Umpires:
Frances Block (ENG)
Sandra Wagner (GER)

==== Pool B ====
Pos	Team	Pld	W	D	L	GF	GA	GD	Pts	Qualification
1	Germany	3	2	0	1	12	7	+5	6	Advanced to Semi-finals
2	Czech Republic (H)	3	2	0	1	9	8	+1	6	Advanced to Semi-finals
3	Ukraine	3	1	0	2	10	11	−1	3	Pool C
4	Russia	3	1	0	2	10	15	−5	3	Pool C

Updated to match(es) played on 19 January 2018. Source: FIH
Rules for classification: 1) points; 2) goal difference; 3) goals scored; 4) head-to-head result.
(H) Hosts

19 January 2018
12:20

Germany	5–1	Ukraine
Grambusch 9'; Meffert 9'; Steindor 13', 32'; Gablać 37'	Report	Khilko 34'

Umpires:
Celine Martin-Schmets (UKR)
Anastasia Bogolyubova (RUS)

19 January 2018
13:30

Czech Republic	3–4	Russia
Lehovcová 20+', 36'; Haklová 33'	Report	Borisova 7', 28', 32'; Sadovaia 13'

Umpires:
Sviatlana Karzhevich (BLR)
Sandra Wagner (GER)

19 January 2018
18:20

Ukraine	8–4	Russia
Ponomarenko 7', 13'; Vorushylo 20', 22', 31', 34'; Moroz 38'; Stetsenko 40'	Report	Borisova 18', 27', 30', 39'

Umpires:
Daniela Kavanova (CZE)
Xenia Ulrich (NED)

19 January 2018
19:30

Czech Republic	4–3	Germany
Kyndlová 14'; Capouchová 31', 32'; Lehovcová 34'	Report	Wortmann 15', 26'; Steindor 21'

Umpires:
Frances Block (ENG)
Olena Klymenko (UKR)

20 January 2018
11:20

Germany	4–2	Russia
Vivot 11', 27'; Meffert 15'; Grambusch 25'	Report	Sadovaia 21', 33'

Umpires:
Celine Martin-Schmets (UKR)
Alwiene Sterk (NED)

20 January 2018
12:30

Ukraine	1–2	Czech Republic
Vorushylo 8'	Report	Lehovcová 28', 38'

Umpires:
Anastasia Bogolyubova (RUS)
Tara Browne (IRL)

=== Second round ===
==== Pool C ====
The result between the teams from the same preliminary round pool were carried over.

Pos	Team	Pld	W	D	L	GF	GA	GD	Pts	Relegation
1	Ukraine	3	2	1	0	13	7	+6	7	
2	Switzerland	3	1	2	0	6	5	+1	5	
3	Russia	3	1	1	1	10	11	−1	4	Relegated to 2020 EuroHockey Indoor Championship II
4	Poland	3	0	0	3	3	9	−6	0	Relegated to 2020 EuroHockey Indoor Championship II

Source: FIH
Rules for classification: 1) points; 2) goal difference; 3) goals scored; 4) head-to-head result.

20 January 2018
16:30

Poland	1–4	Russia
Wessolowska 25'	Report	Eroshina 8'; Sadovaia 12'; Borisova 26', 28'

Umpires:
Tara Browne (IRL)
Xenia Ulrich (NED)

20 January 2018
17:40

Switzerland	2–2	Ukraine
Wälti 17'; Stomps 35'	Report	Shevchenko 8'; Vorushylo 40+'

Umpires:
Daniela Kavanova (CZE)
Celine Martin-Schmets (UKR)

21 January 2018
10:00

Ukraine	3–1	Poland
Vorushylo 2'; Ponomarenko 16'; Stetsenko 28'	Report	Grotek 30'

Umpires:
Sviatlana Karzhevich (BLR)
Anastasia Bogolyubova (RUS)

21 January 2018
11:10

Switzerland	2–2	Russia
Wälti 20+'; Trösch 31'	Report	Borisova 28'; Eroshina 28'

Umpires:
Sandra Wagner (GER)
Alwiene Sterk (NED)

==== Knockout stage ====
Semifinals
20 January
Germany	5
Belarus	4
20 January
Netherlands	6
Czech Republic	3

Final
21 January
Germany (p.s.o)	1 (2)
Netherlands	1 (1)
Third place
21 January
Belarus	5
Czech Republic	3

===== Semifinals =====
20 January 2018
18:50

Germany	5–4	Belarus
Grambusch 4', 11', 24'; Steindor 7'; Wortmann 28'	Report	Batura 5', 14'; Mikheichyk 36'; Bahushevich 37'

Umpires:
Alwiene Sterk (NED)
Olena Klymenko (UKR)

20 January 2018
20:15

Netherlands	6–3	Czech Republic
Van Nes 5', 14'; Veen 10', 24'; Albers 15', 40'	Report	Laciná 13'; Haklová 16'; Lehovcová 22'

Umpires:
Frances Block (ENG)
Sandra Wagner (GER)

===== Third place game =====
21 January 2018
13:00

Belarus	5–3	Czech Republic
Nikitsina 10'; Batura 14', 25', 33'; Syrayezhka 36'	Report	Kolářová 5'; Lehovcová 28', 32'

Umpires:
Celine Martin-Schmets (UKR)
Xenia Ulrich (NED)

===== Final =====
21 January 2018
14:30

Germany	1–1	Netherlands
Vivot 33'	Report	Van der Hoek 32'
Penalties
Vivot (penalty shoot-out scored); Martin-Pelegrina (penalty shoot-out missed); Gablać (penalty shoot-out missed) —— Vivot (penalty shoot-out scored)	2–1	(penalty shoot-out missed) Zwinkels; (penalty shoot-out missed) Van Laarhoven; (penalty shoot-out scored) Muyselaar —— (penalty shoot-out missed) Muyselaar

Umpires:
Frances Block (ENG)
Olena Klymenko (UKR)

== Final ranking ==
Rank	Team
Gold medal	Germany
Silver medal	Netherlands
Bronze medal	Belarus
4	Czech Republic
5	Ukraine
6	Switzerland
7	Russia
8	Poland
