= Felice Albers =

Dutch field hockey player

Personal information
- Born: 27 December 1999 (age 26) Amstelveen, Netherlands

Sport
- Sport: Field hockey
- Position: Forward
- Club: Amsterdam
National team
Years	Team	Caps	Goals
2019–	Netherlands U–21	6	(3)
2018–	Netherlands Indoor	6	(5)
2019–	Netherlands	18	(13)
Medal record
Women's field hockey
Representing Netherlands
Olympic Games
Gold medal – first place	2020 Tokyo	Team
Gold medal – first place	2024 Paris	Team
World Cup
Gold medal – first place	2022 Terrassa/Amstelveen
Silver medal – second place	2026 Wavre/Amstelveen
European Championship
Gold medal – first place	2021 Amstelveen
Gold medal – first place	2023 Mönchengladbach
EuroHockey Junior Championship
Silver medal – second place	2019 Valencia
EuroHockey Indoor Championship
Silver medal – second place	2018 Prague

Felice Albers (born 27 December 1999) is a Dutch field hockey player.

== Career ==
=== Club hockey ===
Albers plays club hockey for Amsterdam in the Dutch Hoofdklasse.

In 2019, Albers was a member of the Amsterdam team that won the 47th and last edition of EuroHockey Club Champions Cup, before it was replaced by the Women's Euro Hockey League. The team won the 2019 final 7–0 against Real Sociedad at the tournament held in Amstelveen, Netherlands.

=== Junior national teams ===
==== Under–18 ====
In 2016, Albers represented the Netherlands U–18 team at the EuroHockey Youth Championships. At the tournament, she scored one goal and won a gold medal with the team.

==== Under–21 ====
Following her appearances in the national U–18 side, Albers appeared regularly in Dutch youth teams. In 2019, she debuted for the national U–21 side at the EuroHockey Junior Championship in Valencia, Spain, where she won a silver medal.

=== Senior national teams ===
==== Indoor ====
Albers was a member of the Netherlands Indoor side at the 2018 EuroHockey Indoor Nations Championship in Prague, Czech Republic.

==== Outdoor ====
In 2019, Albers made her senior international debut in the FIH Pro League in a match against Belgium on 9 June. Three days later, in a match against New Zealand she scored her first international goal.

===== International goals =====
Goal	Date	Location	Opponent	Score	Result	Competition	Ref.
1	12 June 2019	HC Den Bosch, 's-Hertogenbosch, Netherlands	New Zealand	2–0	3–2	2019 FIH Pro League	
2	26 January 2020	Karen Shelton Stadium, Chapel Hill, United States	United States	1–0	9–0	2020 FIH Pro League	
3	26 January 2020	Karen Shelton Stadium, Chapel Hill, United States	United States	4–0	9–0	2020 FIH Pro League	
4	26 January 2020	Karen Shelton Stadium, Chapel Hill, United States	United States	6–0	9–0	2020 FIH Pro League	
5	7 June 2021	Wagener Stadium, Amsterdam, Netherlands	Spain	7–0	7–1	2021 EuroHockey Championship	
6	9 June 2021	Wagener Stadium, Amsterdam, Netherlands	Scotland	7–0	10–0	2021 EuroHockey Championship	
7	11 June 2021	Wagener Stadium, Amsterdam, Netherlands	Belgium	2–0	3–1	2021 EuroHockey Championship	
8	24 July 2021	Oi Hockey Stadium, Tokyo, Japan	India	1–0	5–1	2020 Summer Olympics	
9	24 July 2021	Oi Hockey Stadium, Tokyo, Japan	India	3–1	5–1	2020 Summer Olympics	
10	26 July 2021	Oi Hockey Stadium, Tokyo, Japan	Ireland	1–0	4–0	2020 Summer Olympics	
11	28 July 2021	Oi Hockey Stadium, Tokyo, Japan	South Africa	4–0	5–0	2020 Summer Olympics	
12	4 August 2021	Oi Hockey Stadium, Tokyo, Japan	Great Britain	1–0	5–1	2020 Summer Olympics	
13	4 August 2021	Oi Hockey Stadium, Tokyo, Japan	Great Britain	4–0	5–1	2020 Summer Olympics	
