= Cécile Pieper =

German field hockey player

Personal information
- Full name: Cécile Sophie Pieper
- Born: 31 August 1994 (age 31) Heidelberg, Germany
- Height: 1.66 m (5 ft 5 in)
- Weight: 56 kg (123 lb)

Sport
- Sport: Field hockey
- Position: Midfielder
- Club: HGC
National team
Years	Team	Caps	Goals
2013–	Germany	93	(5)
Medal record
Olympic Games
Bronze medal – third place	2016 Rio de Janeiro	Team
European Championship
Silver medal – second place	2019 Antwerp
Silver medal – second place	2021 Amstelveen
Bronze medal – third place	2023 Mönchengladbach
Indoor World Cup
Gold medal – first place	2018 Berlin

Cécile Sophie Pieper (born 31 August 1994) is a German field hockey player. She represented her country at the 2016 Summer Olympics.

As of 2018, Pieper was studying for a master's degree at the University of Connecticut, where she played on the Connecticut Huskies field hockey team.
