= Lieke van Wijk =

Dutch field hockey player (born 1993)

Personal information
- Full name: Lieke van Wijk
- Born: 18 September 1993 (age 32) Netherlands

Sport
- Sport: Field hockey
- Position: Defender
Senior career
Years	Team	Caps	Goals
2019	Laren	-	-
2019 - 2022	Hurley	-	-
2022 -	Pinoké	-	-
National team
Years	Team	Caps	Goals
2010	Netherlands U18	6	(5)
2012–14	Netherlands U21	16	(23)
2016–	Netherlands Indoor	29	(27)
Medal record
Women's field hockey
Representing Netherlands
Youth Olympic Games
Gold medal – first place	2010 Singapore	Team
Junior World Cup
Gold medal – first place	2013 Mönchengladbach
European Indoor Championship
Gold medal – first place	2016 Minsk
Silver medal – second place	2018 Prague
Silver medal – second place	2020 Minsk
Silver medal – second place	2022 Hamburg
Women's indoor hockey
Indoor World Cup
Silver medal – second place	2018 Berlin
Gold medal – first place	2023 Pretoria

Lieke van Wijk (born 18 September 1993) is a Dutch field hockey player.

== Career ==
=== Club hockey ===
In the Dutch Hoofdklasse, van Wijk played club hockey until 2019 for Laren. With Laren she won the Hoofdklasse Indoor Hockey in 2018. From the 2019 season she played 3 years for Hurley and from 2022 on she is playing for Pinoké. In the 2022–2023 season, van Wijk became again Hoofdklasse Indoor Hockey champion of the Netherlands together with Pinoké.

=== National teams ===
==== Under–21 ====
Playing for Netherlands junior teams for 4 years, van Wijk won 4 gold medals; two EuroHockey Junior Nations Championships, one Youth Olympic Games and one Junior World Cup.

==== Indoor ====
Lieke van Wijk also plays at an international level for the Netherlands Indoor hockey team. With the team, she won gold at the 2016 EuroHockey Indoor Championship, silver at the 2018 EuroHockey Indoor Championship, silver at the 2020 EuroHockey Indoor Championship and again silver at the 2022 EuroHockey Indoor Championship.

At the 2018 Indoor Hockey World Cup van Wijk won silver. Van Wijk won gold at the 2023 Women's FIH Indoor Hockey World Cup.
