= Teresa Martin-Pelegrina =

German field hockey player (born 1997)

Personal information
- Born: 11 November 1997 (age 28) Germany

Sport
- Sport: Field hockey
- Position: Forward
- Club: UHC Hamburg
National team
Years	Team	Caps	Goals
2016–2018	Germany U–21	47	(6)
2016–	Germany Indoor	15	(4)
2017–	Germany	34	(2)
Medal record
Women's indoor hockey
Representing Germany
EuroHockey Indoor Championship
Gold medal – first place	2018 Prague	Team

Teresa Martin-Pelegrina (born 11 November 1997) is a field and indoor hockey player from Germany, who plays as a forward.

== Career ==
=== Club hockey ===
In the German Bundesliga, Martin-Pelegrina plays for UHC Hamburg.

=== International hockey ===
==== Under–21 ====
Teresa Martin-Pelegrina made her debut for the German Under–21 side in 2016, during a test series against England in Bisham Abbey. She went on to represent the side at the FIH Junior World Cup in Santiago later that year, where the team finished fifth.

She went on to represent the junior team until 2018.

==== Indoor ====
In 2016, Martin-Pelegrina debuted for the German Indoor side at the EuroHockey Indoor Championship in Minsk. Since her debut she has represented the team at a further two EuroHockey Indoor Championships, winning gold in 2018.

==== Die Danas ====
Following appearances for the Junior and Indoor teams, Martin-Pelegrina debuted for the Die Danas in 2017, during a test series against Ireland in Düsseldorf.

During her career, she has represented the national team at major tournaments including the FIH World League, EuroHockey Nations Championships and the FIH Pro League.

=== International goals ===
Goal	Date	Location	Opponent	Score	Result	Competition	Ref.
1	19 August 2017	Wagener Stadium, Amsterdam, Netherlands	Scotland	3–0	4–1	2017 EuroHockey Championship	
2	19 November 2017	North Harbour Hockey Stadium, Auckland, New Zealand	China	3–0	3–0	2016–17 FIH World League Final	
