= 2021 Women's EuroHockey Championship =

International field hockey competition

Tournament details
- Host country: Netherlands
- City: Amstelveen
- Dates: 5–13 June
- Teams: 8 (from 1 confederation)
- Venue: Wagener Stadium

Final positions
- Champions: Netherlands (11th title)
- Runner-up: Germany
- Third place: Belgium

Tournament statistics
- Matches played: 20
- Goals scored: 80 (4 per match)
- Top scorer: (Netherlands) Frédérique Matla (8 goals)

The 2021 Women's EuroHockey Championship was the 15th edition of the Women's EuroHockey Championship, the biennial international women's field hockey championship of Europe organised by the European Hockey Federation.

The tournament was held alongside the men's tournament at the Wagener Stadium in Amstelveen, Netherlands and was originally scheduled to take place from 20 to 29 August 2021. However, following the postponement of the 2020 Summer Olympics to July and August 2021 because of the COVID-19 pandemic the tournament was rescheduled and takes place from 5 to 13 June 2021.

The top three teams not already qualified qualified for the 2022 World Cup. The hosts Netherlands won the tournament for the eleventh time, beating Germany 2–0. Belgium won the bronze medal, defeating Spain with 3–1.

== Qualification ==
Along with the hosts, the Netherlands, the top 5 teams at the 2019 EuroHockey Championship which was held in Antwerp from 16 to 25 August 2019 and the top 2 teams from the 2019 EuroHockey Championships II qualified. The numbers in brackets are the pre-tournament world rankings of when the draw was made.

Dates	Event	Location	Quotas	Qualifier(s)
1 July 2018	Host	—N/a	1	Netherlands (1)
16–25 August 2019	2019 EuroHockey Championship	Antwerp, Belgium	5	Belgium (12); England (5); Germany (4); Ireland (8); Spain (7)
4–10 August 2019	2019 EuroHockey Championship II	Glasgow, Scotland	2	Italy (17); Scotland (22)
Total			8	

== Preliminary round ==
The pools were announced on 11 May 2020.

All times are local (UTC+2).

=== Pool A ===
Pos	Team	Pld	W	D	L	GF	GA	GD	Pts	Qualification
1	Netherlands (H)	3	3	0	0	21	1	+20	9	Semi-finals
2	Spain	3	1	1	1	6	9	−3	4	Semi-finals
3	Ireland	3	1	1	1	2	5	−3	4	
4	Scotland	3	0	0	3	1	15	−14	0	

Source: FIH
Rules for classification: 1) points; 2) matches won; 3) goal difference; 4) goals for; 5) head-to-head result; 6) field goals for.
(H) Hosts

5 June 2021
15:30

Netherlands	4–0	Ireland
Van Maasakker 9'; Leurink 14', 44'; Matla 25'	Report

Umpires:
Laurine Delforge (BEL)
Sophie Bockelmann (GER)

5 June 2021
18:00

Spain	4–1	Scotland
Riera 8'; Jiménez 31'; Oliva 32'; Magaz 36'	Report	Dark 48'

Umpires:
Alison Keogh (IRL)
Ilaria Amorosini (ITA)

7 June 2021
12:30

Ireland	1–0	Scotland
Carroll 46'	Report

Umpires:
Sophie Bockelmann (GER)
Ilaria Amorosini (ITA)

7 June 2021
20:00

Spain	1–7	Netherlands
Barrios 56'	Report	De Goede 14'; Matla 19', 42', 43'; Stam 27'; Van Maasakker 35'; Albers 55'

Umpires:
Michelle Meister (GER)
Céline Martin-Schmets (BEL)

9 June 2021
12:30

Ireland	1–1	Spain
Upton 2'	Report	B. García 12'

Umpires:
Laurine Delforge (BEL)
Ilaria Amorosini (ITA)

9 June 2021
20:00

Netherlands	10–0	Scotland
De Goede 4', 12'; Keetels 15', 36'; Matla 31', 56'; Verschoor 42', 47', 50'; Albers 42'	Report

Umpires:
Ivona Makar (CRO)
Sophie Bockelmann (GER)

=== Pool B ===
Pos	Team	Pld	W	D	L	GF	GA	GD	Pts	Qualification
1	Germany	3	2	1	0	7	1	+6	7	Semi-finals and 2022 FIH Hockey World Cup
2	Belgium	3	1	2	0	6	2	+4	5	Semi-finals and 2022 FIH Hockey World Cup
3	England	3	1	1	1	5	3	+2	4	
4	Italy	3	0	0	3	0	12	−12	0	

Source: FIH
Rules for classification: 1) points; 2) matches won; 3) goal difference; 4) goals for; 5) head-to-head result; 6) field goals for.

6 June 2021
10:30

England	4–0	Italy
Evans 13'; Hunter 25'; De Ledesma 48'; Rayer 52'	Report

Umpires:
Céline Martin-Schmets (BEL)
Anastasia Bogolyubova (RUS)

6 June 2021
12:45

Germany	1–1	Belgium
Pieper 53'	Report	Ballenghien 55'

Umpires:
Sarah Wilson (SCO)
Ymkje van Slooten (NED)

7 June 2021
14:45

Belgium	4–0	Italy
Ballenghien 24', 54'; Raye 34'; De Mot 51'	Report

Umpires:
Ymkje van Slooten (NED)
Anastasia Bogolyubova (RUS)

7 June 2021
17:00

England	0–2	Germany
	Report	Zimmermann 8'; Fleschütz 32'

Umpires:
Ivona Makar (CRO)
Alison Keogh (IRL)

9 June 2021
14:45

Germany	4–0	Italy
Fleschütz 4'; Stapenhorst 33'; Lorenz 42'; Wortmann 54'	Report

Umpires:
Ymkje van Slooten (NED)
Anastasia Bogolyubova (RUS)

9 June 2021
17:00

Belgium	1–1	England
Vanden Borre 59'	Report	Ansley 58'

Umpires:
Sarah Wilson (SCO)
Michelle Meister (GER)

== Fifth to eighth place classification ==
The points obtained in the preliminary round against the other team will be carried over.

Pos	Team	Pld	W	D	L	GF	GA	GD	Pts	Qualification
5	England	3	3	0	0	12	2	+10	9	2022 FIH Hockey World Cup
6	Ireland	3	2	0	1	5	5	0	6	
7	Scotland	3	1	0	2	4	5	−1	3	
8	Italy	3	0	0	3	1	10	−9	0	

Source: FIH
Rules for classification: 1) points; 2) matches won; 3) goal difference; 4) goals for; 5) head-to-head result; 6) field goals for.

11 June 2021
09:15

Scotland	3–1	Italy
Shields 17'; Robertson 21'; Bell 47'	Report	Laurito 53'

Umpires:
Laurine Delforge (BEL)
Sophie Bockelmann (GER)

11 June 2021
11:30

Ireland	1–5	England
Duke 9'	Report	Toman 20'; Burge 23', 29'; Owsley 42'; Hunter 59'

Umpires:
Sarah Wilson (SCO)
Ilaria Amorosini (ITA)

12 June 2021
16:30

Ireland	3–0	Italy
O'Flanagan 27', 42'; Malseed 47'	Report

Umpires:
Ivona Makar (CRO)
Anastasia Bogolyubova (RUS)

12 June 2021
18:45

England	3–1	Scotland
Petter 3'; Owsley 30', 42'	Report	Bell 29'

Umpires:
Céline Martin-Schmets (BEL)
Ymkje van Slooten (NED)

== First to fourth place classification ==
Semi-finals
11 June
Netherlands	3
Belgium	1
11 June
Germany	4
Spain	1

Final
13 June
Netherlands	2
Germany	0
Third place
13 June
Belgium	3
Spain	1

=== Semi-finals ===
11 June 2021
16:00

Netherlands	3–1	Belgium
Matla 5'; Albers 16'; Van Maasakker 49'	Report	Vanden Borre 37'

Umpires:
Céline Martin-Schmets (BEL)
Ivona Makar (CRO)

11 June 2021
18:30

Germany	4–1	Spain
Pieper 3'; Zimmermann 45'; Maertens 60'; Schröder 60'	Report	Bonastre 13'

Umpires:
Michelle Meister (GER)
Alison Keogh (IRL)

=== Third and fourth place ===
13 June 2021
10:30

Belgium	3–1	Spain
Nelen 21'; Raye 42'; Ballenghien 47'	Report	Jimenez 46'

Umpires:
Michelle Meister (GER)
Alison Keogh (IRL)

=== Final ===
13 June 2021
13:00

Netherlands	2–0	Germany
Keetels 18'; Matla 56'	Report

Umpires:
Laurine Delforge (BEL)
Sarah Wilson (SCO)

== Statistics ==
=== Final standings ===
Rank	Team
1st place, gold medalist(s)	Netherlands
2nd place, silver medalist(s)	Germany
3rd place, bronze medalist(s)	Belgium
4	Spain
5	England
6	Ireland
7	Scotland
8	Italy

Team qualified for the 2022 World Cup

=== Awards ===
The following awards were given at the conclusion of the tournament.

Player of the tournament	Goalkeeper of the tournament	Under-21 talent of the tournament	Top goalscorer
(Netherlands) Eva de Goede	(Belgium) Elena Sotgiu	(Belgium) Ambre Ballenghien	(Netherlands) Frédérique Matla

=== Goalscorers ===
There were 80 goals scored in 20 matches, for an average of 4 goals per match.

8 goals

- (Netherlands) Frédérique Matla

4 goals

- (Belgium) Ambre Ballenghien

3 goals

- (England) Lily Owsley
- (Netherlands) Felice Albers
- (Netherlands) Eva de Goede
- (Netherlands) Marloes Keetels
- (Netherlands) Caia van Maasakker
- (Netherlands) Maria Verschoor

2 goals

- (Belgium) Abigail Raye
- (Belgium) Stephanie Vanden Borre
- (England) Esme Burge
- (England) Joanne Hunter
- (Germany) Jette Fleschütz
- (Germany) Cécile Pieper
- (Germany) Sonja Zimmermann
- (Ireland) Anna O'Flanagan
- (Netherlands) Laurien Leurink
- (Scotland) McKenzie Bell
- (Spain) Lucía Jiménez Vicente

1 goal

- (Belgium) France de Mot
- (Belgium) Barbara Nelen
- (England) Giselle Ansley
- (England) Sarah Evans
- (England) Catherine De Ledesma
- (England) Isabelle Petter
- (England) Elena Rayer
- (England) Anna Toman
- (Germany) Nike Lorenz
- (Germany) Pia Maertens
- (Germany) Anne Schröder
- (Germany) Charlotte Stapenhorst
- (Germany) Amelie Wortmann
- (Ireland) Naomi Carroll
- (Ireland) Deirdre Duke
- (Ireland) Zara Malseed
- (Ireland) Roisin Upton
- (Italy) Sofia Laurito
- (Netherlands) Lauren Stam
- (Scotland) Emily Dark
- (Scotland) Sarah Robertson
- (Scotland) Bronwyn Shields
- (Spain) Laura Barrios
- (Spain) Berta Bonastre
- (Spain) Begoña García
- (Spain) Alicia Magaz
- (Spain) Georgina Oliva
- (Spain) Lola Riera

Source: FIH

== See also ==
- 2021 Men's EuroHockey Championship
- 2021 Women's EuroHockey Championship II
