= Viktoria Huse =

German field hockey player

Personal information
- Full name: Viktoria Martha Huse
- Born: 24 October 1995 (age 30) Braunschweig, Germany

Sport
- Sport: Field hockey
- Position: Midfielder
- Club: Club an der Alster
National team
Years	Team	Caps	Goals
2016–	Germany	29	(6)
Medal record
European Championship
Silver medal – second place	2019 Antwerp
Silver medal – second place	2021 Amstelveen
Bronze medal – third place	2023 Mönchengladbach

Viktoria Martha Huse (born 24 October 1995) is a German field hockey player for the German national team.

She participated at the 2018 Women's Hockey World Cup.
