= France de Mot =

Belgian field hockey player (born 2002)

Personal information
- Born: 30 January 2002 (age 24) Belgium

Sport
- Sport: Field hockey
- Position: Midfielder
Senior career
Years	Team	Caps	Goals
2023–	Racing	-	-
National team
Years	Team	Caps	Goals
2021–	Belgium	23	(3)
2023–	Belgium U–21	0	(0)
Medal record
Women's field hockey
Representing Belgium
EuroHockey Championships
Bronze medal – third place	2021 Amsterdam
Hockey Junior World Cup
Bronze medal – third place	2023 Santiago

France de Mot (born 30 January 2002) is a Belgian field hockey player.

== Career ==
=== National team ===
De Mot made her debut for the Red Panthers during season two of the FIH Pro League.

She won her first medal with the national squad in 2021, taking home bronze at the EuroHockey Championship in Amsterdam.

In 2022, she represented Belgium at the FIH World Cup in Terrassa and Amsterdam.

=== Under–21 ===
De Mot will make her junior debut at the 2023 FIH Junior World Cup in Santiago.
