= 2014 Women's EuroHockey Indoor Championship II =

2014 Women's EuroHockey Indoor Nations Championship - Division II
Tournament details
- Host country: Lithuania
- City: Šiauliai
- Dates: 24–26 January
- Teams: 8
- Venue: Šiauliai Arena

Final positions
- Champions: Ukraine
- Runner-up: Belgium
- Third place: Scotland

Tournament statistics
- Matches played: 20
- Goals scored: 174 (8.7 per match)

The 2014 Women's EuroHockey Indoor Nations Championship - Division II was a lower division of EuroHockey Indoor Nations Championship, that was played on January 24–26, 2014 in Šiauliai, Lithuania. The winner and runner up got promoted to 2016 Women's EuroHockey Indoor Nations Championship, while the last place holder got relegated to 2016 Women's EuroHockey Indoor Nations Championship - Division III.

== Results ==
=== Group A ===
| Team | Pld | W | D | L | PF | PA | PD | Pts |
|---|---|---|---|---|---|---|---|---|
| Ukraine | 3 | 3 | 0 | 0 | 25 | 7 | +18 | 9 |
| Scotland | 2 | 2 | 0 | 1 | 20 | 11 | +9 | 6 |
| Russia | 3 | 1 | 0 | 2 | 13 | 13 | 0 | 3 |
| Slovakia | 3 | 0 | 0 | 3 | 5 | 32 | -27 | 0 |

=== Group B ===
| Team | Pld | W | D | L | PF | PA | PD | Pts |
|---|---|---|---|---|---|---|---|---|
| Switzerland | 3 | 1 | 2 | 0 | 8 | 7 | +1 | 5 |
| Belgium | 3 | 1 | 1 | 1 | 7 | 6 | +1 | 4 |
| Lithuania | 3 | 1 | 1 | 1 | 6 | 8 | -2 | 4 |
| Wales | 3 | 1 | 0 | 2 | 6 | 6 | 0 | 3 |

=== 5th-8th place Group ===
| Team | Pld | W | D | L | PF | PA | PD | Pts |
|---|---|---|---|---|---|---|---|---|
| Russia | 3 | 3 | 0 | 0 | 19 | 10 | +9 | 9 |
| Lithuania | 3 | 2 | 0 | 1 | 18 | 8 | +10 | 6 |
| Wales | 3 | 1 | 0 | 2 | 8 | 6 | +2 | 3 |
| Slovakia | 3 | 0 | 0 | 3 | 4 | 25 | -21 | 0 |

=== Medal Group ===
| Team | Pld | W | D | L | PF | PA | PD | Pts |
|---|---|---|---|---|---|---|---|---|
| Ukraine | 3 | 3 | 0 | 0 | 18 | 4 | +14 | 9 |
| Belgium | 3 | 1 | 1 | 1 | 4 | 4 | 0 | 4 |
| Scotland | 3 | 1 | 0 | 2 | 5 | 14 | -9 | 3 |
| Switzerland | 3 | 0 | 1 | 2 | 8 | 13 | -5 | 1 |

== Final ranking ==
| Promoted to 2016 Women's EuroHockey Indoor Nations Championship. |
| Relegated to 2016 Women's EuroHockey Indoor Nations Championship - Division III. |

| # | Teams |
|---|---|
| 1 | Ukraine |
| 2 | Belgium |
| 3 | Scotland |
| 4 | Switzerland |
| 5 | Russia |
| 6 | Lithuania |
| 7 | Wales |
| 8 | Slovakia |
