= Lisa Post =

Dutch field hockey player

Personal information
- Born: 27 January 1999 (age 27) Veldhoven, Netherlands

Sport
- Sport: Field hockey
- Position: Defence
Senior career
Years	Team	Caps	Goals
2022–	SCHC	-	-
National team
Years	Team	Caps	Goals
2017–2019	Netherlands U–21	10	(0)
2019–	Netherlands	34	(0)
Medal record
Women's field hockey
Representing Netherlands
Olympic Games
Gold medal – first place	2024 Paris	Team
World Cup
Silver medal – second place	2026 Wavre/Amstelveen
Women's EuroHockey Championship
Gold medal – first place	2023 Mönchengladbach
Gold medal – first place	2025 Mönchengladbach
FIH Pro League
Gold medal – first place	Season Four
Silver medal – second place	Season Three	{{{2}}}
EuroHockey Junior Championship
Gold medal – first place	2017 Valencia
Silver medal – second place	2019 Valencia

Lisa Post (born 27 January 1999) is a Dutch field hockey player.

== Personal life ==
Lisa Post was born and raised in Eindhoven.

== Career ==
=== Domestic hockey ===
In the Netherlands' domestic league, the Hoofdklasse, Post represents SCHC.

=== Junior national team ===
Post made her debut for the junior national team in 2017. She represent the team at the EuroHockey Junior Championship in Valencia, where she won a gold medal.

In 2019 she represented the team again, winning silver at her second EuroHockey Junior Championship in Valencia.

=== Senior ===
Following her success in the national junior teams, Post was called up to make her senior international debut in 2019. She made her first appearance during season one of the FIH Pro League.

She has since gone on to win silver and gold in seasons three and four of the FIH Pro League, respectively. She also won gold at the 2023 EuroHockey Championship in Mönchengladbach.
