= Bogdana Sadovaia =

Ukrainian born field hockey player (born 1989)

Personal information
- Full name: Bogdana Sadovaia Vasilievna
- Born: 9 December 1989 (age 36) Ukraine

Sport
- Sport: Field hockey
- Position: Forward
- Club: Moscomsport
Senior career
Years	Team	Caps	Goals
2015–2017	Krylatskoye	84	139
2018–	Moscomsport	64	90
National team
Years	Team	Caps	Goals
2012	Ukraine	5	(2)
2017–	Russia	28	(41)
Medal record
Women's field hockey
Representing Russia
EuroHockey Championship II
Silver medal – second place	2017 Cardiff	Team
Women's indoor hockey
Representing Ukraine
World Cup
Bronze medal – third place	2011 Poznań	Team
EuroHockey Championship
Gold medal – first place	2010 Duisburg	Team

Bogdana Sadovaia Vasilievna (born 9 December 1989) is a Ukrainian born field hockey player who represents Russia.

== Career ==
=== Club level ===
At club level, Bogdana Sadovaia represents Moscomsport in the Russian national league.

=== National teams ===
==== Ukraine ====
From 2007 until 2012, Sadovaia represented her home country Ukraine in international tournaments. This included a bronze medal at the 2011 Indoor World Cup in Poznań.

==== Russia ====
Bogdana Sadovaia made her first appearance for Russia in 2017, following a four-year hiatus from international competition. The same year, she won her first medal with the national team, silver at the 2017 EuroHockey Championship II in Cardiff.

Sadovaia is a striker for the Russian team, with an average scoring rate of 1.46 goals per game.
