= Women's EuroHockey Indoor Championship =

- Most recent season or competition: 2026 Women's EuroHockey Indoor Championship
- Sport: Indoor hockey
- Founded: 1975; 51 years ago
- No. of teams: 10
- Confederation: EHF (Europe)
- Most recent champion: Germany (18th title) (2026)
- Most titles: Germany (18 titles)
- Level on pyramid: 1
- Relegation to: EuroHockey Indoor Championship II

The Women's EuroHockey Indoor Championship is an international women's indoor hockey competition organized by the European Hockey Federation. The winning team becomes the champion of Europe. The tournament serves as a qualification tournament for the Women's Indoor Hockey World Cup.

The tournament is part of the EuroHockey Indoor Championships and is the highest level in the women's competition. The lowest two teams each year are relegated to the EuroHockey Indoor Championship II and replaced by the highest two teams from that competition. From 2024 onwards the tournament is played with ten instead of eight teams.

The tournament has been won by five different teams: Germany has the most titles with eighteen, the Netherlands has two titles and England, Ukraine and Belarus have won the tournament once. The most recent edition was held in Prague, Czech Republicand was won by Germany. The next edition will be held in 2028.

== Results ==
Year	Host	Final			Third place match			Number of teams
Year	Host	Winner	Score	Runner-up	Third place	Score	Fourth place	Number of teams
1975	Arras, France	West Germany	Round-robin	Netherlands	Belgium	Round-robin	Switzerland	7
1977	Brussels, Belgium	West Germany	Round-robin	Netherlands	Belgium	Round-robin	France	5
1981	West Berlin, West Germany	West Germany	10–1	Scotland	Canada	9–5	England	8
1985	London, England	West Germany		Netherlands	England		Scotland	8
1987	Bad Neuenahr-Ahrweiler, West Germany	West Germany	10–8	Netherlands	England	3–0	Ireland	8
1990	Elmshorn, West Germany	West Germany	4–3	Spain	Scotland	13–2	France	8
1993	London, England	Germany	8–3	England	Spain	6–4	Scotland	8
1996	Glasgow, Scotland	England		Germany	Spain		Scotland	8
1998	Ourense, Spain	Germany	8–0	England	Austria	3–1	Scotland	8
2000	Vienna, Austria	Germany	9–1	Russia	Czech Republic	4–1	Scotland	8
2002	Les Ponts-de-Cé, France	Germany	14–3	Lithuania	France	4–2	Austria	8
2004	Eindhoven, Netherlands	Germany	6–2	Netherlands	Belarus	1–0	France	8
2006	Eindhoven, Netherlands	Germany	4–2	Netherlands	Belarus	4–3	Scotland	8
2008	Almería, Spain	Germany	5–1	Belarus	Netherlands	4–1	Scotland	8
2010	Duisburg, Germany	Ukraine	6–5	Spain	Germany	4–2	Netherlands	8
2012	Leipzig, Germany	Germany	2–2 (a.e.t.) (3–2 s.o.)	Belarus	Poland	4–3	Netherlands	8
2014; Details	Prague, Czech Republic	Netherlands	3–0	Germany	Poland	2–1	Austria	8
2016; Details	Minsk, Belarus	Netherlands	6–2	Poland	Belarus	6–5	Germany	8
2018; Details	Prague, Czech Republic	Germany	1–1 (2–1 s.o.)	Netherlands	Belarus	5–3	Czech Republic	8
2020; Details	Minsk, Belarus	Belarus	1–1 (4–3 s.o.)	Netherlands	Czech Republic	2–2 (2–1 s.o.)	Germany	8
2022; Details	Hamburg, Germany	Germany	5–4	Netherlands	Ukraine	1–0	Austria	6
2024; Details	Berlin, Germany	Germany	3–2	Poland	Austria	3–1	Spain	10
2026; Details	Prague, Czech Republic	Germany	5–2	Czech Republic	Austria	3–2	Spain	10
2028; Details	Vienna, Austria							10
2030; Details	Brussels, Belgium							10

=== Summary ===
Team	Winners	Runners-up	Third place	Fourth place
Germany	18 (1975, 1977, 1981*, 1985, 1987*, 1990*, 1993, 1998, 2000, 2002, 2004, 2006, 2008, 2012*, 2018, 2022*, 2024*, 2026)	2 (1996, 2014)	1 (2010*)	2 (2016, 2020)
Netherlands	2 (2014, 2016)	9 (1975, 1977, 1985, 1987, 2004*, 2006*, 2018, 2020, 2022)	1 (2008)	2 (2010, 2012)
Belarus	1 (2020*)	2 (2008, 2012)	4 (2004, 2006, 2016*, 2018)	
England	1 (1996)	2 (1993*, 1998)	2 (1985*, 1987	1 (1981)
Ukraine	1 (2010)		1 (2022)	
Spain		2 (1990, 2010)	2 (1993, 1996)	2 (2024, 2026)
Poland		2 (2016, 2024)	2 (2012, 2014)	
Czech Republic		1 (2026*)	2 (2000, 2020)	1 (2018*)
Scotland		1 (1981)	1 (1990)	7 (1985, 1993, 1986*, 1998, 2000, 2006, 2008)
Lithuania		1 (2002)		
Russia		1 (2000)		
Austria			3 (1998, 2024, 2026)	3 (2002, 2014, 2022)
Belgium			2 (1975, 1977*)	
France			1 (2002)	3 (1977, 1990, 2004)
Canada			1 (1981)	
Ireland				1 (1987)
Switzerland				1 (1975)

* = hosts

=== Team appearances ===
Team	(France) 1975	(Belgium) 1977	(West Germany) 1981	(England) 1985	(West Germany) 1987	(West Germany) 1990	(England) 1993	(Scotland) 1996	(Spain) 1998	(Austria) 2000	(France) 2002	(Netherlands) 2004	(Netherlands) 2006	(Spain) 2008	(Germany) 2010	(Germany) 2012	(Czech Republic) 2014	(Belarus) 2016	(Czech Republic) 2018	(Belarus) 2020	(Germany) 2022	(Germany) 2024	(Czech Republic) 2026	Total
Austria	6th	–	5th	6th	8th	–	7th	6th	3rd	7th	4th	5th	6th	8th	–	6th	4th	7th	–	6th	4th	3rd	3rd	19
Belarus	Part of the Soviet Union						–	–	–	6th	–	3rd	3rd	2nd	5th	2nd	6th	3rd	3rd	1st	DSQ	–	–	10
Belgium	3rd	3rd	–	–	–	–	–	–	–	–	–	–	–	–	–	–	–	8th	–	7th	–	6th	5th	6
Canada	–	–	3rd	5th	–	–	–	–	–	–	–	–	–	–	–	–	–	–	–	–	–	–	–	2
Czech Republic	Part of Czechoslovakia						–	–	–	3rd	5th	6th	8th	–	–	5th	5th	6th	4th	3rd	5th	5th	2nd	12
Czechoslovakia	–	–	–	–	–	–	6th	Defunct																1
Denmark	–	–	–	–	–	–	8th	8th	–	–	–	–	–	–	–	–	–	–	–	–	–	–	–	2
England	–	–	4th	3rd	3rd	–	2nd	1st	2nd	8th	–	–	–	–	–	–	7th	–	–	–	–	–	–	8
France	5th	4th	8th	–	5th	4th	5th	7th	–	–	3rd	4th	7th	–	–	–	8th	–	–	–	–	–	–	11
Germany	1st	1st	1st	1st	1st	1st	1st	2nd	1st	1st	1st	1st	1st	1st	3rd	1st	2nd	4th	1st	4th	1st	1st	1st	23
Italy	–	–	–	8th	–	7th	–	–	–	–	–	–	–	7th	–	–	–	–	–	–	–	10th	–	4
Ireland	–	–	–	7th	4th	6th	–	–	–	–	–	–	–	–	–	–	–	–	–	–	–	–	9th	4
Lithuania	Part of the Soviet Union						–	–	8th	–	2nd	7th	–	–	8th	–	–	–	–	–	–	–	10th	5
Netherlands	2nd	2nd	6th	2nd	2nd	–	–	–	–	–	–	2nd	2nd	3rd	4th	4th	1st	1st	2nd	2nd	2nd	–	–	15
Poland	–	–	–	–	–	8th	–	–	–	–	–	–	–	–	6th	3rd	3rd	2nd	8th	–	–	2nd	8th	8
Russia	Part of the Soviet Union						–	–	6th	2nd	6th	8th	–	–	–	–	–	–	7th	–	DSQ	–	–	5
Scotland	–	–	2nd	4th	6th	3rd	4th	4th	4th	4th	8th	–	4th	4th	7th	–	–	–	–	–	–	–	–	12
Slovakia	Part of Czechoslovakia							5th	5th	5th	7th	–	–	–	–	–	–	–	–	–	–	–	–	4
Spain	7th	5th	7th	–	7th	2nd	3rd	3rd	7th	–	–	–	–	6th	2nd	7th	–	–	–	–	–	4th	4th	13
Switzerland	4th	–	–	–	–	–	–	–	–	–	–	–	–	–	–	–	–	–	6th	8th	–	8th	7th	5
Turkey	–	–	–	–	–	–	–	–	–	–	–	–	–	–	–	–	–	–	–	–	6th	9th	–	2
Ukraine	Part of the Soviet Union						–	–	–	–	–	–	5th	5th	1st	8th	–	5th	5th	5th	3rd	7th	6th	10
Wales	–	–	–	–	–	5th	–	–	–	–	–	–	–	–	–	–	–	–	–	–	–	–	–	1
Total	7	5	8	8	8	8	8	8	8	8	8	8	8	8	8	8	8	8	8	8	6	10	10	

== See also ==
- Men's EuroHockey Indoor Championship
- Women's EuroHockey Indoor Championship II
- EuroHockey Indoor Championships
- Women's EuroHockey Championship
- Women's EuroHockey Indoor Club Cup
