= Kateřina Laciná =

Czech field hockey player

Personal information
- Born: 13 November 1993 (age 32) Czech Republic

Sport
- Sport: Field hockey
- Position: Midfield
Senior career
Years	Team	Caps	Goals
–	Braxgata	-	-
National team
Years	Team	Caps	Goals
2012–	Czech Republic	105	(24)
2014–	Czech Republic Indoor	54	(45)
Medal record
Women's field hockey
Representing Czech Republic
EuroHockey Championship II
Silver medal – second place	2015 Prague
Silver medal – second place	2023 Prague
Women's indoor hockey
FIH Indoor World Cup
Bronze medal – third place	2015 Leipzig
Bronze medal – third place	2023 Pretoria
Bronze medal – third place	2025 Poreč
EuroHockey Indoor Championship
Bronze medal – third place	2020 Minsk

Kateřina Laciná (born 13 November 1993) is a Czech indoor and field hockey player.

== Life ==
Laciná was born on 13 November 1993.

== Career ==
=== Domestic league ===
Laciná competes in the Belgian Hockey League for Braxgata.

In 2019, Laciná moved to Australia to represent the Tassie Tigers in season one of the Sultana Bran Hockey One League.

=== Indoor hockey ===
Laciná made her international indoor hockey debut in 2014 at the EuroHockey Indoor Championship in Prague.

Since her debut, she has represented the national team at all but one EuroHockey Indoor Championship and every edition of the FIH Indoor World Cup. During this time she has earned bronze medals at the 2015 and 2023 editions of the FIH Indoor World Cup, as well as the 2020 edition of the EuroHockey Indoor Championship.

=== Field hockey ===
Laciná made her senior international debut in 2012 during round one of the 2012–13 FIH World League.

Throughout her career, Laciná has been present at numerous international events, and has been captain of the national side since 2022. She has medalled twice with the national team, taking home silver at the 2015 and 2023 editions of the EuroHockey Championship II.

She has been named in the squad for the 2024 FIH Olympic Qualifiers in Ranchi.
