= Adéla Lehovcová =

Czech field hockey player

Personal information
- Born: 11 June 1991 (age 35) Czechoslovakia

Sport
- Sport: Field hockey
- Position: Forward
Senior career
Years	Team	Caps	Goals
–	Slavia Praha	-	-
National team
Years	Team	Caps	Goals
2012–	Czech Republic	124	(43)
2014–	Czech Republic Indoor	55	(85)
Medal record
Women's field hockey
Representing Czech Republic
EuroHockey Championship II
Silver medal – second place	2015 Prague
Silver medal – second place	2023 Prague
Women's indoor hockey
FIH Indoor World Cup
Bronze medal – third place	2015 Leipzig
Bronze medal – third place	2023 Pretoria
Bronze medal – third place	2025 Poreč
EuroHockey Indoor Championship
Bronze medal – third place	2020 Minsk

Adéla Lehovcová (born 11 June 1991) is a Czech indoor and field hockey player.

== Life ==
Lehovcová was born on 11 June 1991.

== Career ==
=== Domestic league ===
In the Czech National League, Lehovcová represents HC Slavia Praha.

=== Indoor hockey ===
Lehovcová made her international indoor hockey debut in 2014 at the EuroHockey Indoor Championship in Prague.

Since her debut, she has represented the national team at every EuroHockey Indoor Championship and FIH Indoor World Cup held. During this time she has earned bronze medals at the 2015 and 2023 editions of the FIH Indoor World Cup, as well as the 2020 edition of the EuroHockey Indoor Championship.

=== Field hockey ===
Lehovcová made her senior international debut in 2012 during round one of the 2012–13 FIH World League.

Throughout her career, Lehovcová has been present at numerous international events, and also captained the national side from 2016 to 2019. She has medalled twice with the national team, taking home silver at the 2015 and 2023 editions of the EuroHockey Championship II.

She has been named in the squad for the 2024 FIH Olympic Qualifiers in Ranchi.
