= 2018 Men's EuroHockey Club Trophy =

Tournament details
- Host country: Austria
- City: Vienna
- Dates: 18–21 May
- Teams: 8 (from 7 associations)
- Venue: Wiener AC

Final positions
- Champions: (Scotland) Grange (1st title)
- Runner-up: (Ukraine) OKS Vinnitsa
- Third place: (Belarus) Minsk

Tournament statistics
- Matches played: 16
- Goals scored: 105 (6.56 per match)
- Top scorer: (Poland) Patryk Pawlak (9 goals)
- Best player: (Scotland) Cameron Fraser

The 2018 Men's EuroHockey Club Trophy was the 42nd edition of the men's EuroHockey Club Trophy, Europe's secondary club field hockey tournament organized by the European Hockey Federation. It was held from 18 to 21 May 2018 at Wiener AC in Vienna, Austria.

Grange won their first title by defeating OKS Vinnitsa 5–2 in the final. Minsk won the bronze medal by defeating the defending champions Rotweiss Wettingen 5–3.

== Qualified teams ==
The following eight teams with the following seeding participated in the tournament.

1. (Poland) AZS AWF Poznań
2. (Italy) Bra
3. (Switzerland) Rotweiss Wettingen
4. (Scotland) Grange
5. (Belarus) Minsk
6. (Austria) WAC
7. (Ukraine) OKS Vinnitsa
8. (Belarus) Stroitel Brest

== Preliminary round ==
=== Pool A ===
Pos	Team	Pld	W	D	L	GF	GA	GD	Pts	Qualification
1	(Scotland) Grange	3	2	0	1	8	4	+4	11	Final
2	(Belarus) Minsk	3	2	0	1	9	7	+2	11	Third place game
3	(Belarus) Stroitel Brest	3	2	0	1	8	8	0	11	Fifth place game
4	(Poland) AZS AWF Poznań	3	0	0	3	5	11	−6	2	Seventh place game

Source: EHF
Rules for classification: 1) points; 2) matches won; 3) goal difference; 4) goals for; 5) head-to-head result; 6) field goals for.

18 May 2018
11:00

AZS AWF Poznań (Poland)	2–3	(Belarus) Minsk
	Report

18 May 2018
13:15

Grange (Scotland)	1–2	(Belarus) Stroitel Brest
	Report

19 May 2018
10:00

Minsk (Belarus)	4–2	(Belarus) Stroitel Brest
	Report

19 May 2018
12:15

Grange (Scotland)	4–0	(Poland) AZS AWF Poznań
	Report

20 May 2018
10:00

AZS AWF Poznań (Poland)	3–4	(Belarus) Stroitel Brest
	Report

20 May 2018
12:15

Minsk (Belarus)	2–3	(Scotland) Grange
	Report

=== Pool B ===
Pos	Team	Pld	W	D	L	GF	GA	GD	Pts	Qualification
1	(Ukraine) OKS Vinnitsa	3	2	1	0	16	2	+14	12	Final
2	(Switzerland) Rotweiss Wettingen	3	2	0	1	10	4	+6	11	Third place game
3	(Austria) WAC (H)	3	1	1	1	10	4	+6	8	Fifth place game
4	(Italy) Bra	3	0	0	3	1	27	−26	0	Seventh place game

Source: EHF
Rules for classification: 1) points; 2) matches won; 3) goal difference; 4) goals for; 5) head-to-head result; 6) field goals for.
(H) Hosts

18 May 2018
15:30

Rotweiss Wettingen (Switzerland)	0–2	(Ukraine) OKS Vinnitsa
	Report

18 May 2018
17:45

Bra (Italy)	0–7	(Austria) WAC
	Report

19 May 2018
14:30

Rotweiss Wettingen (Switzerland)	7–0	(Italy) Bra
	Report

19 May 2018
16:45

WAC (Austria)	1–1	(Ukraine) OKS Vinnitsa
	Report

20 May 2018
14:30

Bra (Italy)	1–13	(Ukraine) OKS Vinnitsa
	Report

20 May 2018
16:45

WAC (Austria)	2–3	(Switzerland) Rotweiss Wettingen
	Report

== Classification round ==
=== Seventh place game ===
21 May 2018
09:00

AZS AWF Poznań (Poland)	19–2	(Italy) Bra
	Report

=== Fifth place game ===
21 May 2018
11:15

Stroitel Brest (Belarus)	2–0	(Austria) WAC
	Report

=== Third place game ===
21 May 2018
13:30

Minsk (Belarus)	5–3	(Switzerland) Rotweiss Wettingen
	Report

=== Final ===
21 May 2018
15:45

Grange (Scotland)	5–2	(Ukraine) OKS Vinnitsa
	Report

== Final standings ==
1. (Scotland) Grange
2. (Ukraine) OKS Vinnitsa
3. (Belarus) Minsk
4. (Switzerland) Rotweiss Wettingen
5. (Belarus) Stroitel Brest
6. (Austria) WAC
7. (Poland) AZS AWF Poznań
8. (Italy) Bra

== See also ==
- 2017–18 Euro Hockey League
- 2018 Women's EuroHockey Club Trophy
