= 2026 Men's EuroHockey Club Trophy I =

Tournament details
- Host country: Austria
- City: Vienna
- Dates: 3–6 April
- Teams: 8 (from 1 association)

Final positions
- Champions: (Wales) Cardiff & Met (4th title)
- Runner-up: (Scotland) Watsonians
- Third place: (Ireland) Lisnagarvey

Tournament statistics
- Matches played: 16
- Goals scored: 114 (7.13 per match)
- Top scorer(s): Oliver Kidd (Ireland) Lisnagarvey (8 goals)

The 2026 Men's EuroHockey Club Trophy I was the 49th edition of Europe's secondary men's club field hockey tournament organised by the European Hockey Federation, and the fourth edition since it was renamed from the Men's EuroHockey Club Trophy to the Men's EuroHockey Club Trophy I. The tournament was hosted by Arminen in Vienna, Austria from 3 to 6 April 2026.

== Teams ==
- (Portugal) Lousada
- (Wales) Cardiff & Met
- (Ireland) Lisnagarvey
- (Ukraine) OKS Vinnitsa
- (Austria) Arminen
- (Czech Republic) Plzeň-Litice
- (Poland) Grunwald Poznań
- (Scotland) Watsonians

=== Pool A ===
Pos	Team	Pld	W	D	L	GF	GA	GD	Pts	Qualification or relegation
1	(Scotland) Watsonians	3	3	0	0	12	7	+5	15	Final
2	(Austria) Arminen	3	2	0	1	11	9	+2	10	Third place match
3	(Poland) Grunwald Poznań	3	1	0	2	8	11	−3	5	Fifth place match
4	(Czech Republic) Plzeň-Litice	3	0	0	3	11	15	−4	0	Seventh place match

Source: EHF
Rules for classification: 1) points; 2) matches won; 3) goal difference; 4) goals for; 5) head-to-head result; 6) field goals for.

3 April 2026
15:00

Watsonians (Scotland)	3–1	(Poland) Grunwald Poznań
Coultas 3'; Jack 12'; Orr 47'	Report	Sikorski 5'

Umpires:
Dan Stewart (ENG)
Maksym Perepelytsia (UKR)

3 April 2026
17:15

Arminen (Austria)	5–3	(Czech Republic) Plzeň-Litice
Spatz 25', 28'; Bele 26'; Losonci 29'; Hackl 49'	Report	Uhlíř 13'; Bárta 20'; Gerlický 53'

Umpires:
Ana Faias (POR)
Christian Phillips-Adams (WAL)

4 April 2026
14:30

Plzeň-Litice (Czech Republic)	4–5	(Poland) Grunwald Poznań
Uhliř 2', 28'; Augustinič 16'; Gerlický 45'	Report	Sikorski 13', 18'; Jarzembowski 25'; Lange 26', 53'

Umpires:
Maksym Perepelytsia (UKR)
Ana Faias (POR)

4 April 2026
16:45

Watsonians (Scotland)	4–2	(Austria) Arminen
Orr 2'; Rowson 13'; Jack 32', 44'	Report	Kelner 30', 60'

Umpires:
Illaria Amorosini (ITA)
Russel Donaldson (IRL)

5 April 2026
14:30

Plzeň-Litice (Czech Republic)	4–5	(Scotland) Watsonians
Gerlický 20', 22'; Homolka 33', 59'	Report	Cain 12'; Jack 30'; Orr 35'; Coultas 37', 53'

Umpires:
Ana Faias (POR)
Ilaria Amorosini (ITA)

5 April 2026
16:45

Arminen (Austria)	4–2	(Poland) Grunwald Poznań
Losonci 8'; Kelner 23'; Hackl 33'; Bele 60'	Report	Głowacki 7'; Bratkowski 18'

Umpires:
Christian Phillips-Adams (WAL)
Russell Donaldson (IRL)

=== Pool B ===
Pos	Team	Pld	W	D	L	GF	GA	GD	Pts	Qualification or relegation
1	(Wales) Cardiff & Met	3	3	0	0	19	5	+14	15	Final
2	(Ireland) Lisnagarvey	3	2	0	1	19	4	+15	10	Third place match
3	(Portugal) Lousada	3	0	1	2	8	15	−7	2	Fifth place match
4	(Ukraine) OKS Vinnitsa	3	0	1	2	6	28	−22	2	Seventh place match

Source: EHF
Rules for classification: 1) points; 2) matches won; 3) goal difference; 4) goals for; 5) head-to-head result; 6) field goals for.

3 April 2026
10:30

Cardiff & Met (Wales)	5–2	(Portugal) Lousada
Mabey 15'; Rawlings 29', 55'; Pritchard 32'; Cable 58'	Report	Marques 20'; Ribeiro 56'

Umpires:
Ilaria Amorosini (ITA)
Petr Větrovský (CZE)

3 April 2026
12:45

Lisnagarvey (Ireland)	12–0	(Ukraine) OKS Vinnitsa
Kidd 4', 15', 29', 56', 59'; Cunningham 10', 21', 47'; B. Nelson 28', 57'; Getty 42'; M. Nelson 44'	Report

Umpires:
Bernhard Hajos (AUT)
Lukasz Orzeł (POL)

4 April 2026
10:00

OKS Vinnitsa (Ukraine)	5–5	(Portugal) Lousada
Kaplinskyi 28', 32'; Semeniushko 29'; Diachenko 46'; Cherniuk 60+'	Report	G. Teixeira 3'; Ribeiro 40', 41', 60'; Valinhas 54'

Umpires:
Petr Větrovský (CZE)
Bernhard Hajos (AUT)

4 April 2026
12:15

Cardiff & Met (Wales)	3–2	(Ireland) Lisnagarvey
Cable 17', 37'; Dicker 38'	Report	Kidd 45'; B. Nelson 53'

Umpires:
Dan Stewart (ENG)
Duncan Ruzzak (SCO)

5 April 2026
10:00

Lisnagarvey (Ireland)	5–1	(Portugal) Lousada
Kidd 5'; McNellis 8', 14'; M. Nelson 34', 36'	Report	Ribeiro 47'

Umpires:
Lukasz Orzeł (POL)
Duncan Ruzzak (SCO)

5 April 2026
12:15

OKS Vinnitsa (Ukraine)	1–11	(Wales) Cardiff & Met
Popov 52'	Report	Mabey 10'; Pritchard 15', 31', 43', 47'; Bhogal 16', 25'; Rawlings 22'; Dicker 29', 54'; Riley 40'

Umpires:
Dan Stewart (ENG)
Petr Větrovský (CZE)

== Classification round ==
=== Seventh and eighth place ===
6 April 2026
09:00

Plzeň-Litice (Czech Republic)	3–0	(Ukraine) OKS Vinnitsa
Batík 29', 30', 35'	Report

Umpires:
Christian Phillips-Adams (WAL)
Bernhard Hajos (AUT)

=== Fifth and sixth place ===
6 April 2026
11:15

Grunwald Poznań (Poland)	4–4	(Portugal) Lousada
Sikorski 2', 41'; Juskowiak 8'; Bratkowski 53'	Report	Lurgo 15'; Marques 19'; R. Teixeira 31'; Sá 45'
Penalties
Lange (penalty shoot-out scored); Staszewski (penalty shoot-out scored); Boiko (penalty shoot-out scored); Juskowiak (penalty shoot-out missed)	3–2	(penalty shoot-out missed) Valinhas; (penalty shoot-out scored) Marques; (penalty shoot-out scored) R. Teixeira; (penalty shoot-out missed) Caramalho; (penalty shoot-out missed) G. Teixeira

Umpires:
Dan Stewart (ENG)
Maksym Perepelytsia (UKR)

=== Third and fourth place ===
6 April 2026
13:30

Arminen (Austria)	2–5	(Ireland) Lisnagarvey
Hackl 18'; Kelner 32'	Report	M. Nelson 10'; Getty 13'; McNellis 17'; B. Nelson 19'; Kidd 49'

Umpires:
Lukasz Orzeł (POL)
Ana Faias (POR)

=== Final ===
6 April 2026
15:45

Watsonians (Scotland)	0–2	(Wales) Cardiff & Met
	Report	Rawlings 19'; Pritchard 22'

Umpires:
Ilaria Amorosini (ITA)
Russell Donaldson (IRL)

== Final standings ==
Pos	Team	Relegation
1	(Wales) Cardiff & Met	
2	(Scotland) Watsonians	
3	(Ireland) Lisnagarvey	
4	(Austria) Arminen (H)	
5	(Poland) Grunwald Poznań	
6	(Portugal) Lousada	
7	(Czech Republic) Plzeň-Litice (R)	EuroHockey Club Trophy II
8	(Ukraine) OKS Vinnitsa (R)	EuroHockey Club Trophy II

Source: Eurohockey
(H) Host; (R) Relegated

== See also ==
- 2025–26 Men's Euro Hockey League
- 2026 Women's EuroHockey Club Trophy I
