= Men's EuroHockey Club Trophy I =

Annual men's field hockey competition

EuroHockey Club Trophy I
- Most recent season or competition: 2026 Men's EuroHockey Club Trophy I
- Formerly: EuroHockey Club Trophy
- Sport: Field hockey
- Founded: 1981; 45 years ago
- First season: 1981
- No. of teams: 8
- Confederation: EHF (Europe)
- Most recent champion: (Wales) Cardiff & Met (4th title) (2026)
- Most titles: (Wales) Cardiff & Met (4 titles)
- Level on pyramid: 2
- Relegation to: EuroHockey Club Trophy II

The EuroHockey Club Trophy I is an annual men's field hockey competition organised by the EHF for European hockey clubs. It is the second most prestigious European club competition, being one tier below the top men's European club competition the Euro Hockey League. In that sense, the ECT is hockey's equivalent of the UEFA Europa League.

== Format ==
The tournament features 8 clubs from EHF member countries.

=== Qualification ===
Each year one of the 8 available league places is allocated to an EHF member country's national association. The clubs admitted are the clubs of those nations who finished ranked third to sixth in the previous year's Trophy I; the clubs of those two nations promoted from the previous year's Trophy II; plus the clubs of any nations relegated from the Euro Hockey League via the co-efficient system.

=== Tournament summary ===
The teams are separated into 2 pools of 4 teams. In each pool (pool A and B) the teams play one match against each of the other three teams in their pool (making a total of six pool matches). The teams then go on to play classification matches based on their relative ranking from these pool matches to determine their final tournament position.

=== Tournament details ===
In each pool, A, and B, all the teams play each other once, with points awarded as follows:

- 5 points for a win
- 2 points for a draw
- 1 point for a loss with a goal difference of no more than 2
- 0 points for a loss with a goal difference of more than 2

Once the relative ranking of the teams in pools A and B is settled, the classification matches proceed as follows:

- The teams ranked first in each pool will play for 1st and 2nd place (the Final)
- The teams ranked 2nd in each pool will play for 3rd/4th place (bronze medal)
- The teams ranked 3rd in each pool will play for 5th/6th place
- The teams ranked 4th in each pool will play for 7th/8th place

If the score at the end of the regulation time of a classification match is a draw, then a shoot-out competition is played to establish a winner.

== Higher and lower tournaments ==
Above the EuroHockey Club Trophy I is the Euro Hockey League, and below it is the EuroHockey Trophy II, the EuroHockey Club Challenge 1, and so on. This structure is designed to give every EHF member nation the opportunity to enter their best clubs into European competition at an appropriate level, and through that exposure to improve the level of their domestic hockey.

== Results ==
=== 1981–1989 ===
From 1981 until 1989, the tournament was held once a year and the finalists' countries were promoted to the EuroHockey Club Champions Cup.

Year	Host	Final			Third place match		
Year	Host	Winner	Score	Runner-up	Third place	Score	Fourth place
1981; Details	Rome, Italy	(Ireland); Cookstown	1–1 (a.e.t.); 5–2 (p.s.)	(Italy); Eur	(Austria); Arminen	2–1	(Poland); Warta Poznań
1982; Details	Cardiff, Wales	(Gibraltar); Rock Gunners		(France); Amiens	(Wales); Cardiff		(Scotland); Edinburgh
1983; Details	Subotica, Yugoslavia	(Italy); Eur	2–0	(Ireland); Banbridge	(Socialist Federal Republic of Yugoslavia); Suboticanka	5–0	(Wales); Cardiff
1984; Details	Vienna, Austria	Racing Club de France		(Socialist Federal Republic of Yugoslavia); Suboticanka	(Scotland); Grange		(Finland); Espoo
1985; Details	Banbridge, Northern Ireland	(Ireland); Banbridge		(Italy); Amsicora	(Portugal); Ramaldense		(Austria); WAC
1986; Details	Gothenburg, Sweden	(Scotland); Edinburgh	3–1	(Gibraltar); Grammarians	Racing Club de France	4–0	(Switzerland); Olten
1987; Details	Swansea, Wales	(England); Southgate		(Ireland); Banbridge	(France); Amiens		(Switzerland); Olten
1988; Details	Helsinki, Finland	(France); Amiens		(Austria); Arminen	(Wales); Whitchurch		(Gibraltar); Grammarians
1989; Details	Lisburn, Northern Ireland	(Belgium); Léopold		(Ireland); Lisnagarvey	(Gibraltar); Grammarians		(Italy); Amsicora

=== 1990–1993 ===
From 1990 until 1993 the tournament was held twice a year and only the winner's countries were promoted to the EuroHockey Club Champions Cup.

Year	Host	Final			Third place match		
Year	Host	Winner	Score	Runner-up	Third place	Score	Fourth place
1990; Details	Amiens, France	(East Germany); Osternienburg		(France); Amiens	(Gibraltar); Grammarians		(Switzerland); Olten
1990; Details	Gothenburg, Sweden	(Poland); Lech Poznań		(Italy); Amsicora	(Scotland); Menzieshill		(Austria); WAC
1991; Details	Olten, Switzerland	Racing Club de France		(Gibraltar); Grammarians	(Italy); Amsicora		(Switzerland); Olten
1991; Details	Glasgow, Scotland	(Ireland); Lisnagarvey		(Scotland); Kelburne	(Socialist Federal Republic of Yugoslavia); Zorka Subotica		(Austria); HC Wien
1992; Details	Gibraltar	(Scotland); Kelburne		(Gibraltar); Grammarians	(Wales); Cardiff		(Finland); Espoo
1992; Details	Prague, Czechoslovakia	(Austria); HC Wien		(Czechoslovakia); Slavia Praha	(Poland); Pocztowiec Poznań		(Socialist Federal Republic of Yugoslavia); Zorka Subotica
1993; Details	Havant, England	(England); Havant		(Poland); Grunwald Poznań	(Belarus); Minsk		(Sweden); Stockholm
1993; Details	Prague, Czech Republic	(Russia); Dinamo Stroitel		(Italy); Amsicora	(Ireland); Avoca		(Czech Republic); Slavia Praha

=== 1994–2002 ===
Because of the introduction of the EuroHockey Club Challenge, the tournament went back to the old format from 1994 until 2002.

Year	Host	Final			Third place match		
Year	Host	Winner	Score	Runner-up	Third place	Score	Fourth place
1994; Details	Milan, Italy	(Italy); Cernusco		(Poland); Grunwald Poznań	(Belarus); Minsk		(Austria); HC Wien
1995; Details	Glasgow, Scotland	Racing Club de France		(Belarus); Minsk	(Scotland); Kelburne		(Gibraltar); Grammarians
1996; Details	Prague, Czech Republic	(Russia); Samara		(Gibraltar); Grammarians	(England); Teddington		(Ireland); Pembroke Wanderers
1997; Details	Cagliari, Italy	(Ireland); Instonians	2–2 (a.e.t.); 4–3 (p.s.)	(Italy); Amsicora	(England); Cannock	4–2	(Belgium); White Star
1998; Details	Brasschaat, Belgium	(England); Reading	5–2	(Belgium); Dragons	(Russia); Samara	2–1	(Gibraltar); Eagles
1999; Details	Milan, Italy	(Italy); Cernusco	2–1	(Gibraltar); Eagles	(Scotland); Western Wildcats	3–1	(Ireland); Instonians
2000; Details	Belfast, Northern Ireland	(Scotland); Western Wildcats	5–3	(Ireland); Instonians	(Switzerland); Olten	3–2	(Belgium); Dragons
2001; Details	Antwerp, Belgium	(Belgium); Dragons	3–1	(Belarus); Stroitel Brest	(Switzerland); Rotweiss Wettingen	7–5	(Czech Republic); Slavia Praha
2002; Details	Wettingen, Switzerland	(France); Lille	3–1	(Ireland); Pembroke Wanderers	(Russia); Dinamo Stroitel	4–2	(Switzerland); Rotweiss Wettingen

=== 2003–2007 ===
From 2003 until 2007 there was no final but instead, there were two promotion play-offs and the winners were ranked joint first and the winner's countries were promoted. The final ranking was decided based on their record in the pools.

Year	Host	Promotion play-off winners		Promotion play-off losers	
Year	Host	Winner	Runner-up	Third place	Fourth place
2003; Details	Rome, Italy	(Switzerland); Rotweiss Wettingen	(Austria); AHTC Wien	(Italy); Roma	(Russia); Dinamo Stroitel
2004; Details	Prague, Czech Republic	(Czech Republic); Slavia Praha	(Scotland); Western Wildcats	(Ukraine); Kolos Vinnitsa	(France); Lille
2005; Details	Brest, Belarus	(Poland); Pocztowiec Poznań	(Belarus); Stroitel Brest	(France); Montrouge	(Austria); WAC
2006; Details	Wettingen, Switzerland	(France); Stade Français	(Scotland); Kelburne	(Switzerland); Rotweiss Wettingen	(Ireland); Lisnagarvey
2007; Details	Prague, Czech Republic	(Russia); Dinamo Kazan	(Ireland); Pembroke Wanderers	(Switzerland); Rotweiss Wettingen	(Wales); Cardiff

=== 2008–2019 ===
In 2008 the tournament went back to its old format with a final but instead of two promotion places, the clubs scored points for their national association in the EHF 3-year rating, which sets the number of clubs in a nation for the European Cup competitions. Qualifying for the trophy were the runners-up of the countries in positions 9 to 12 and the champions of the countries in positions 13 to 16 in the EHF 3-year rating.

Year	Host	Final			Third place match		
Year	Host	Winner	Score	Runner-up	Third place	Score	Fourth place
2008; Details	Paris, France	(Ireland); Glenanne	5–4	(France); Montrouge	(Ukraine); Olympia Kolos Sekvoia	3–1	(Italy); Roma
2009; Details	Dublin, Ireland	(Ireland); Pembroke Wanderers	4–0	(Russia); Dinamo Elektrostal	(Belarus); Stroitel Brest	3–1	(Switzerland); Rotweiss Wettingen
2010; Details	Cardiff, Wales	(Russia); Dinamo Elektrostal	6–3	(Scotland); Grange	(Ukraine); Olympia Kolos Sekvoia	2–2 (a.e.t.); 6–5 (p.s.)	(Belarus); Stroitel Brest
2011; Details	Rome, Italy	(Austria); AHTC Wien	4–1	(Italy); Roma	(Switzerland); Rotweiss Wettingen	2–1	(France); Saint Germain
2012; Details	Lille, France	(France); Lille	3–2	(Scotland); Kelburne	(Belarus); Stroitel Brest	4–2	(Italy); Roma
2013; Details	Vienna, Austria	(Poland); Politechnika Poznanska	4–2	(Wales); Cardiff & UWIC	(Austria); Arminen	6–5 (a.e.t.)	(Ukraine); Olympia Kolos Sekvoia
2014; Details	Cagliari, Italy	(Ireland); Monkstown	2–0	(Ukraine); OKS-SHVSM	(Azerbaijan); Atasport	4–0	(Italy); Amsicora
2015; Details	Dublin, Ireland	(Belarus); Stroitel Brest	3–1	(Czech Republic); Slavia Praha	(Azerbaijan); Atasport	3–2	(Ireland); Three Rock Rovers
2016; Details	Glasgow, Scotland	(Wales); Cardiff & Met	4–0	(Ireland); Banbridge	(Scotland); Kelburne	3–0	(Czech Republic); Slavia Praha
2017; Details	Elektrostal, Russia	(Switzerland); Rotweiss Wettingen	1–0	(Austria); Arminen	(Russia); Dinamo Elektrostal	4–0	(Scotland); Grove Menzieshill
2018; Details	Vienna, Austria	(Scotland); Grange	5–2	(Ukraine); OKS Vinnitsa	(Belarus); Minsk	5–3	(Switzerland); Rotweiss Wettingen
2019; Details	Wettingen, Switzerland	(Wales); Cardiff & Met	4–3	(Belarus); Stroitel Brest	(Switzerland); Rotweiss Wettingen	4–3	(Ukraine); OKS Vinnitsa

=== 2020–present ===
In 2020, the EuroHockey Club Trophy was renamed to EuroHockey Club Trophy I.

Year	Host	Final			Third place match			Number of teams
Year	Host	Winner	Score	Runner-up	Third place	Score	Fourth place	Number of teams
2020; Details	Vienna, Austria	Canceled due to the COVID-19 pandemic.			Cancelled			8
2021; Details	Vienna, Austria	(France); Montrouge	5–0	(Austria); Post SV	(Switzerland); Rotweiss Wettingen	2–2 (4–3 s.o.)	(Belarus); Stroitel Brest	6
2022; Details	Paris, France	(France); Montrouge	2–1	(Switzerland); Rotweiss Wettingen	(Portugal); Lousada	2–1	(Czech Republic); Bohemians Prague	4
2023; Details	Vienna, Austria	(Wales); Cardiff & Met	4–2	(Ukraine); OKS Vinnitsa	(Scotland); Grange	5–4	(Switzerland); Grasshoppers	8
2024; Details	Lousada, Portugal	(Ireland); Lisnagarvey	4–2	(Wales); Cardiff & Met	(Austria); Arminen	3–3 (3–1 s.o.)	(Scotland); Grange	8
2025; Details	Lisburn, Northern Ireland	(France); Montrouge	3–3 (4–2 s.o.)	(Ireland); Lisnagarvey	(Wales); Cardiff & Met	6–0	(Scotland); Grange	7
2026; Details	Vienna, Austria	(Wales); Cardiff & Met	2–0	(Scotland); Watsonians	(Ireland); Lisnagarvey	5–2	(Austria); Arminen	8

== Records and statistics ==
=== Performance by club ===
Medal table by club
Rank	Club	Gold	Silver	Bronze	Total
1	(Wales) Cardiff & Met (Note: Includes results representing Cardiff until 2008 and Cardiff & UWIC until 2013)	4	2	3	9
2	(France) Montrouge	3	1	1	5
3	Racing Club de France	3	0	1	4
4	(Ireland) Lisnagarvey	2	2	1	5
5	(Switzerland) Rotweiss Wettingen	2	1	6	9
6	(Poland) Politechnika Poznanska (Note: Includes results representing Pocztowiec Poznań until 2012)	2	0	1	3
7	(Italy) Cernusco	2	0	0	2
7	(France) Lille	2	0	0	2
9	(Scotland) Kelburne	1	3	2	6
9	(Belarus) Stroitel Brest	1	3	2	6
11	(Ireland) Banbridge	1	3	0	4
12	(France) Amiens	1	2	1	4
13	(Ireland) Pembroke Wanderers	1	2	0	3
13	(Czech Republic) Slavia Prague	1	2	0	3
15	(Scotland) Grange	1	1	2	4
16	(Russia) Dinamo Elektrostal	1	1	1	3
16	(Scotland) Western Wildcats	1	1	1	3
18	(Austria) AHTC Wien	1	1	0	2
18	(Belgium) Dragons	1	1	0	2
18	(Italy) Eur	1	1	0	2
21–58	Remaining	17	22	27	66
Totals (58 entries)		49	49	49	147

=== Performances by nation ===
Medal table by nation
Rank	Nation	Gold	Silver	Bronze	Total
1	France (FRA)	10	3	3	16
2	Ireland (IRL)	8	8	2	18
3	Scotland (SCO)	4	6	6	16
4	Wales (WAL)	4	2	4	10
5	Russia (RUS)	4	1	3	8
6	Italy (ITA)	3	6	2	11
7	Poland (POL)	3	2	1	6
8	England (ENG)	3	0	2	5
9	Austria (AUT)	2	4	3	9
10	Switzerland (SUI)	2	1	7	10
11	Belgium (BEL)	2	1	0	3
12	Gibraltar (GIB)	1	5	2	8
13	Belarus (BLR)	1	4	5	10
14	Czech Republic (CZE)	1	2	0	3
15	East Germany (GDR)	1	0	0	1
16	Ukraine (UKR)	0	3	3	6
17	Yugoslavia (YUG)	0	1	2	3
18	Azerbaijan (AZE)	0	0	2	2
18	Portugal (POR)	0	0	2	2
Totals (19 entries)		49	49	49	147

== See also ==
- EuroHockey Club Champions Cup
- Euro Hockey League
- Women's EuroHockey Club Trophy
