= 2017–18 Feldhockey-Bundesliga =

Bundesliga
- Season: 2017–18
- Dates: 9 September 2017 – 10 June 2018
- Champions: Uhlenhorst Mülheim (17th title)
- Premiers: Rot-Weiss Köln
- Relegated: TSV Mannheim; Münchner SC
- Euro Hockey League: Uhlenhorst Mülheim; Rot-Weiss Köln; Mannheimer HC
- Matches: 132
- Goals: 680 (5.15 per match)
- Top goalscorer: Michael Körper (29 goals)
- Biggest home win: Club an der Alster 8–2 Düsseldorfer HC
- Biggest away win: Düsseldorfer HC 1–10 Harvestehude
- Highest scoring: Düsseldorfer HC 1–10 Harvestehude

The 2017–18 Feldhockey-Bundesliga was the 76th season of the top German league for field hockey clubs. The season started in on 9 September 2017 and concluded with the championship final on 10 June 2018. Mannheimer HC were the defending champions, while Düsseldorfer HC and Münchner SC entered as the promoted teams from the 2016–17 2. Bundesliga.

Rot-Weiss Köln won the regular season with an eight point lead, they qualified together with Mannheimer HC, Uhlenhorst Mülheim and Harvetshude for the Final Four. In the Final Four or championship playoff Uhlenhorst Mülheim and Rot-Weiss Köln qualified for the final where Uhlenhorst Mülheim won 3–2 and they won their 17th title after a 21 year wait.

== Teams ==
2017–18 Feldhockey-Bundesliga teams

Twelve teams competed in the league – the top ten teams from the previous season and the two teams promoted from the 2. Bundesliga. The promoted teams were Düsseldorfer HC and Münchner SC, who replaced Klipper THC and Lichterfelde.

| Team | Location | State |
|---|---|---|
| Berliner HC | Berlin | Berlin |
| Club an der Alster | Hamburg | Hamburg |
| Düsseldorfer HC | Düsseldorf | North Rhine-Westphalia |
| Harvestehuder THC | Hamburg | Hamburg |
| Crefelder HTC | Krefeld | North Rhine-Westphalia |
| Mannheimer HC | Mannheim | Baden-Württemberg |
| Münchner SC | Munich | Bavaria |
| Nürnberger HTC | Nuremberg | Bavaria |
| Rot-Weiss Köln | Cologne | North Rhine-Westphalia |
| TSV Mannheim | Mannheim | Baden-Württemberg |
| UHC Hamburg | Hamburg | Hamburg |
| Uhlenhorst Mülheim | Mülheim | North Rhine-Westphalia |

=== Number of teams by state ===
| State | Number of teams | Clubs |
|---|---|---|
| North Rhine-Westphalia | 4 | Düsseldorfer HC, Crefelder HTC, Rot-Weiss Köln and Uhlenhorst Mülheim |
| Hamburg | 3 | Club an der Alster, Harvestehuder THC and UHC Hamburg |
| Baden-Württemberg | 2 | Mannheimer HC and TSV Mannheim |
| Bavaria | 2 | Nürnberger HTC and Münchner SC |
| Berlin | 1 | Berliner HC |
| Total | 12 | |

== Regular season ==
=== League table ===
| Pos | Team | Pld | W | D | L | GF | GA | GD | Pts | Qualification or relegation |
|---|---|---|---|---|---|---|---|---|---|---|
| 1 | Rot-Weiss Köln | 22 | 16 | 3 | 3 | 71 | 39 | +32 | 51 | Qualification for the Euro Hockey League and the play offs |
| 2 | Mannheimer HC | 22 | 12 | 7 | 3 | 62 | 44 | +18 | 43 | Qualification for the Euro Hockey League and the play offs |
| 3 | Uhlenhorst Mülheim (C) | 22 | 13 | 3 | 6 | 71 | 50 | +21 | 42 | Qualification for the Euro Hockey League and the play offs |
| 4 | Harvestehuder THC | 22 | 12 | 5 | 5 | 74 | 46 | +28 | 41 | Qualification for the play offs |
| 5 | Club an der Alster | 22 | 11 | 4 | 7 | 84 | 58 | +26 | 37 | |
| 6 | Berliner HC | 22 | 11 | 2 | 9 | 42 | 47 | −5 | 35 | |
| 7 | UHC Hamburg | 22 | 7 | 6 | 9 | 59 | 63 | −4 | 27 | |
| 8 | Crefelder HTC | 22 | 6 | 5 | 11 | 42 | 55 | −13 | 23 | |
| 9 | Nürnberger HTC | 22 | 6 | 3 | 13 | 48 | 67 | −19 | 21 | |
| 10 | Düsseldorfer HC | 22 | 6 | 2 | 14 | 44 | 80 | −36 | 20 | |
| 11 | TSV Mannheim (R) | 22 | 5 | 4 | 13 | 48 | 63 | −15 | 19 | Relegation to the 2. Bundesliga |
| 12 | Münchner SC (R) | 22 | 3 | 4 | 15 | 35 | 68 | −33 | 13 | Relegation to the 2. Bundesliga |

Source: hockey.de & Flashscore
(C) Champions; (R) Relegated

=== Results ===
| Home \ Away | BHC | ALS | CRE | DHC | HAR | MHC | MSC | NÜR | RWK | TSV | UHC | UHL |
|---|---|---|---|---|---|---|---|---|---|---|---|---|
| Berliner HC | — | 3–6 | 3–2 | 3–2 | 2–3 | 0–1 | 2–0 | 3–1 | 0–1 | 3–1 | 4–2 | 1–0 |
| Club an der Alster | 5–1 | — | 2–2 | 8–2 | 4–7 | 2–2 | 5–0 | 5–4 | 2–3 | 4–1 | 3–3 | 3–6 |
| Crefelder HTC | 2–4 | 3–1 | — | 1–2 | 0–3 | 2–1 | 2–0 | 1–1 | 2–3 | 2–1 | 2–2 | 2–5 |
| Düsseldorfer HC | 6–2 | 2–7 | 3–2 | — | 1–10 | 2–3 | 2–1 | 2–3 | 2–5 | 5–0 | 0–5 | 0–3 |
| Harvestehuder THC | 1–2 | 1–1 | 2–2 | 4–0 | — | 4–4 | 4–1 | 5–2 | 2–1 | 2–2 | 4–3 | 4–2 |
| Mannheimer HC | 1–1 | 3–2 | 5–1 | 5–3 | 3–2 | — | 3–0 | 4–1 | 2–2 | 3–1 | 3–2 | 1–1 |
| Münchner SC | 1–3 | 3–1 | 3–3 | 1–1 | 4–4 | 2–3 | — | 4–2 | 0–3 | 1–3 | 2–2 | 5–4 |
| Nürnberger HTC | 0–0 | 2–4 | 1–3 | 3–1 | 1–3 | 3–2 | 4–1 | — | 0–2 | 4–2 | 3–2 | 2–2 |
| Rot-Weiss Köln | 3–0 | 2–5 | 3–1 | 3–3 | 1–0 | 6–3 | 4–3 | 7–3 | — | 1–0 | 5–3 | 4–1 |
| TSV Mannheim | 5–1 | 2–6 | 1–3 | 5–0 | 2–4 | 3–3 | 3–1 | 5–4 | 3–3 | — | 4–4 | 2–3 |
| UHC Hamburg | 2–1 | 2–5 | 4–3 | 3–4 | 2–1 | 2–2 | 4–1 | 5–3 | 1–8 | 2–0 | — | 2–3 |
| Uhlenhorst Mülheim | 2–3 | 4–3 | 5–1 | 3–1 | 6–4 | 2–5 | 6–1 | 4–1 | 3–1 | 4–2 | 2–2 | — |

Source: Flashscore
Legend: Blue = home team win; Yellow = draw; Red = away team win.

=== Top goalscorers ===
| Rank | Player | Club | Goals |
|---|---|---|---|
| 1 | (Austria) Michael Körper | Harvestehuder THC | 29 |
| 2 | (Germany) Niklas Bruns | Club an der Alster | 23 |
| 2 | (Argentina) Gonzalo Peillat | Mannheimer HC | 23 |
| 4 | (Germany) Christopher Rühr | Rot-Weiss Köln | 21 |
| 5 | (Germany) Thilo Stralkowski | Uhlenhorst Mülheim | 16 |
| 6 | (Germany) Philip Schlageter | TSV Mannheim | 14 |
| 6 | (Germany) Moritz Fürste | UHC Hamburg | 14 |
| 8 | (Germany) Marco Miltkau | Rot-Weiss Köln | 13 |
| 9 | (Germany) Constantin Staib | Club an der Alster | 12 |
| 10 | (Germany) Martin Häner | Berliner HC | 11 |
| 10 | (Germany) Paul Zmyslony | Mannheimer HC | 11 |
| 10 | (South Africa) Lloyd Norris-Jones | UHC Hamburg | 11 |

== Championship playoff ==
The playoffs were played on 9 and 10 June 2018 in Krefeld.

Semi-finals
9 June – Krefeld
Rot-Weiss Köln | 8
Harvestehuder THC | 2
9 June – Krefeld
Mannheimer HC | 1
Uhlenhorst Mülheim | 2

Final
10 June – Krefeld
Rot-Weiss Köln | 2
Uhlenhorst Mülheim | 3

=== Semi-finals ===
9 June 2018
16:00

| Rot-Weiss Köln | 8–2 | Harvestehuder THC |
|---|---|---|
| Trompertz 3'; Zeller 11'; T. Grambusch 12'; Rühr 29', 53'; Fleckhaus 38', 57'; Miltkau 55' | Report | Spooner 10'; Von Drachenfels 18' |

Gerd-Wellen-Hockeystadion, Krefeld

9 June 2018
18:00

| Mannheimer HC | 1–2 | Uhlenhorst Mülheim |
|---|---|---|
| Haase 55' | Report | Hellwig 1'; Herzbruch 28' |

Gerd-Wellen-Hockeystadion, Krefeld

=== Final ===
10 June 2018
15:00

| Rot-Weiss Köln | 2–3 | Uhlenhorst Mülheim |
|---|---|---|
| Rühr 30'; Fleckhaus 40' | Report | Stralkowski 22'; Hellwig 49'; Schiffer 54' |

Gerd-Wellen-Hockeystadion, Krefeld
