= 2023 Women's EuroHockey Club Trophy =

Women's EuroHockey Club Trophy

Tournament details
- Host country: Switzerland
- City: Wettingen
- Dates: 7–10 April
- Teams: 8
- Venue: HC Rotweiss Wettingen

Final positions
- Champions: (Belgium) Dragons (2nd title)
- Runner-up: (Germany) Mannheimer
- Third place: (England) Hampstead & Westminster

Tournament statistics
- Matches played: 16
- Top scorer: (Belgium) Valerie Magis (8 goals)
- Best player: (Belgium) Valerie Magis

The 2023 Women's EuroHockey Club Trophy was the 46th edition of the women's Women's EuroHockey Club Trophy, Europe's secondary club field hockey tournament organized by the EHF. It was held from 7–10 April 2023 at HC Rotweiss Wettingen in Wettingen, Switzerland.

KHC Dragons won the tournament for the second time, defeating Mannheimer HC 1–0 in the final. Hampstead & Westminster finished in third place after defeating MSC Sumchanka 1–0.

== Teams ==
The following eight teams competed for the title:

- (Belgium) Dragons
- (Czech Republic) Rakovník
- (England) Hampstead & Westminster
- (France) Lambersart
- (Germany) Mannheimer
- (Italy) Lorenzoni
- (Switzerland) Rotweiss Wettingen
- (Ukraine) Sumchanka

== Results ==
=== Preliminary round ===
==== Pool A ====
Pos	Team	Pld	W	D	L	GF	GA	GD	Pts	Qualification
1	(Belgium) Dragons	3	3	0	0	28	0	+28	15	Advance to Final
2	(Ukraine) Sumchanka	3	2	0	1	9	7	+2	10	
3	(Italy) Lorenzoni	3	1	0	2	2	12	−10	5	
4	(Czech Republic) Rakovník	3	0	0	3	1	21	−20	1	

Source: EHF
Rules for classification: 1) Points; 2) Goal difference; 3) Goals scored; 4) Games won; 5) Head-to-head.

7 April 2022
11:00

Lorenzoni (Italy)	2–1	(Czech Republic) Rakovník
Agrò 27', 41'	Report	Daňková 1'

Umpires:
Magali Sergeant (BEL)
Evelien Plug (NED)

7 April 2022
13:15

Dragons (Belgium)	7–0	(Ukraine) Sumchanka
Magis 9', 14', 50'; Vilar 15'; Raye 26'; Roumen 33', 49'	Report

Umpires:
Sandra Adell (ESP)
Gemma Jones (ENG)

8 April 2022
10:00

Sumchanka (Ukraine)	3–0	(Czech Republic) Rakovník
Leonova 43'; Kernoz 57'; Honcharenko 60'	Report

Umpires:
Vilma Bagdanskienė (LTU)
Noelia Blanco (ESP)

8 April 2022
12:15

Lorenzoni (Italy)	0–5	(Belgium) Dragons
	Report	Raye 4', 60'; De Groof 9'; Gil 27'; Magis 60+'

Umpires:
Gemma Jones (ENG)
Sophie Böckelmann (GER)

9 April 2022
10:00

Dragons (Belgium)	16–0	(Czech Republic) Rakovník
De Groof 7'; Gil 9', 39'; Magis 10', 15', 34', 46'; Roumen 15', 17', 30'; Raye 26'; Cedrés 33'; Verboven 35'; Roels 50'; Vilar 51'; A. Marien 59'	Report

Umpires:
Ilaria Amorosini (ITA)
Noelia Blanco (ESP)

9 April 2022
12:15

Sumchanka (Ukraine)	6–0	(Italy) Lorenzoni
Leonova 5', 58'; Tanchenko 17', 37'; Ponomarenko 18', 41'	Report

Umpires:
Kamille Mockaitytė (LTU)
Sophie Böckelmann (GER)

==== Pool B ====
Pos	Team	Pld	W	D	L	GF	GA	GD	Pts	Qualification
1	(Germany) Mannheimer	3	3	0	0	28	0	+28	15	Advance to Final
2	(England) Hampstead & Westminster	3	2	0	1	17	2	+15	11	
3	(Switzerland) Rotweiss Wettingen	3	1	0	2	5	14	−9	5	
4	(France) Lambersart	3	0	0	3	1	35	−34	0	

Source: EHF
Rules for classification: 1) Points; 2) Goal difference; 3) Goals scored; 4) Games won; 5) Head-to-head.

7 April 2022
15:30

Mannheimer (Germany)	18–0	(France) Lambersart
Gerstenhöfer 12', 23', 40'; Neumann 14', 57', 60'; Hendrix 15'; Kurz 18', 26', 49'; Von der Heyde 22', 57'; Kresken 28', 59'; Kanler 29', 48', 51'; F. Habif 52'	Report

Umpires:
Valeriia Tyshchenko (UKR)
Vilma Bagdanskienė (LTU)

7 April 2022
17:45

Hampstead & Westminster (England)	5–0	(Switzerland) Rotweiss Wettingen
Balsdon 2', 24'; Robertson 6', 55'; Hunt 51'	Report

Umpires:
Sophie Böckelmann (GER)
Noelia Blanco (ESP)

8 April 2022
14:30

Hampstead & Westminster (England)	0–2	(Germany) Mannheimer
	Report	F. Habif 53'; Kresken 57'

Umpires:
Magali Sergeant (BEL)
Kamille Mockaitytė (LTU)

8 April 2022
16:45

Lambersart (France)	1–5	(Switzerland) Rotweiss Wettingen
Gryndzinski 37'	Report	Aebi 6'; Möhl 33', 50'; T. Trösch 45'; Schnyder 55'

Umpires:
Sandra Adell (ESP)
Ilaria Amorosini (ITA)

9 April 2022
14:30

Lambersart (France)	0–12	(England) Hampstead & Westminster
	Report	Robertson 8', 47'; O'Flanagan 19', 32', 33'; Wilkinson 28'; Hyams 33'; Balsdon 38', 41'; Turner 43'; Hamilton 52'; Hunt 58'

Umpires:
Magali Sergeant (BEL)
Valeriia Tyshchenko (UKR)

9 April 2022
16:45

Mannheimer (Germany)	8–0	(Switzerland) Rotweiss Wettingen
Kresken 2', 18', 50'; Neumann 12'; Von der Heyde 17'; Gerstenhöfer 32'; Kurz 36', 60+'	Report

Umpires:
Evelien Plug (NED)
Vilma Bagdanskienė (LTU)

=== Classification round ===
==== Seventh and eighth place ====
10 April 2022
08:30

Rakovník (Czech Republic)	7–0	(France) Lambersart
Kantaříková 8'; Bašová 11', 15', 36'; Matoušková 25'; Vorlová 27', 52'	Report

Umpires:
Kamille Mockaitytė (ENG)
Evelien Plug (NED)

==== Fifth and sixth place ====
10 April 2022
10:45

Lorenzoni (Italy)	1–2	(Switzerland) Rotweiss Wettingen
Servadio 41'	Report	Aebi 25'; El Allaly 51'

Umpires:
Gemma Jones (ENG)
Magali Sergeant (BEL)

==== Third and fourth place ====
10 April 2022
13:00

Sumchanka (Ukraine)	0–1	(England) Hampstead & Westminster
	Report	Balsdon 47'

Umpires:
Ilaria Amorosini (ITA)
Sophie Böckelmann (GER)

==== Final ====
10 April 2022
15:15

Dragons (Belgium)	1–0	(Germany) Mannheimer
Raye 17'	Report

Umpires:
Vilma Bagdanskienė (LTU)
Sandra Adell (ESP)

== Final standings ==
Pos	Team	Pld	W	D	L	GF	GA	GD	Pts	Final result
1	(Belgium) Dragons	4	4	0	0	29	0	+29	12	Gold medal
2	(Germany) Mannheimer	4	3	0	1	28	1	+27	9	Silver medal
3	(England) Hampstead & Westminster	4	3	0	1	18	2	+16	9	Bronze medal
4	(Ukraine) Sumchanka	4	2	0	2	9	8	+1	5	
5	(Switzerland) Rotweiss Wettingen	4	2	0	2	7	15	−8	4	
6	(Italy) Lorenzoni	4	1	0	3	3	14	−11	1	
7	(Czech Republic) Rakovník	4	1	0	3	8	21	−13	1	
8	(France) Lambersart	4	0	0	4	1	42	−41	−3	

Source: EHF

== Top Goalscorers ==
Goalscoring Table
Pos.	Player	Club	FG	PC	PS	Total
1	(Belgium) Valerie Magis	Dragons	2	3	3	8
2	(Germany) Aina Kresken	Mannheimer	5	1	0	6
3	(Belgium) Abigail Raye	Dragons	5	0	0	5
3	(Belgium) Magali Roumen	Dragons	5	0	0	5
3	(England) Grace Balsdon	Hampstead & Westminster	0	3	2	5
3	(Germany) Stine Kurz	Mannheimer	0	5	0	5
7	(England) Sarah Robertson	Hampstead & Westminster	4	0	0	4
7	(Germany) Charlotte Gerstenhöfer	Mannheimer	4	0	0	4
7	(Germany) Verena Neumann	Mannheimer	4	0	0	4
