= 2016 Men's EuroHockey Club Champions Trophy =

Tournament details
- Host country: Scotland
- City: Glasgow
- Dates: 13–16 May
- Teams: 7 (from 7 associations)
- Venue(s): Glasgow National Hockey Centre

Final positions
- Champions: (Wales) Cardiff & Met (1st title)
- Runner-up: (Ireland) Banbridge
- Third place: (Scotland) Kelburne

Tournament statistics
- Matches played: 12
- Goals scored: 49 (4.08 per match)
- Top scorer(s): (Wales) James Carson (Ireland) Stephen Dowds (4 goals)
- Best player: (Ireland) Eugene Magee

The 2016 Men's EuroHockey Club Champions Trophy was the 40th edition of the Men's EuroHockey Club Champions Trophy, Europe's secondary club field hockey tournament organized by the European Hockey Federation. It was held from 13 to 16 May 2016 at the Glasgow National Hockey Centre in Glasgow, Scotland.

Cardiff & Met won their first title by defeating Banbridge 4–0 in the final. The hosts Kelburne won the bronze medal by defeating Slavia Prague 3–0.

== Qualified teams ==
The following seven teams participated in the tournament.

- (Wales) Cardiff & Met
- (Ireland) Banbridge
- (Scotland) Kelburne
- (Czech Republic) Slavia Prague
- (Switzerland) Rotweiss Wettingen
- (Italy) Bra
- (Belarus) Minsk

== Preliminary round ==
=== Pool A ===
Pos	Team	Pld	W	D	L	GF	GA	GD	Pts	Qualification
1	(Ireland) Banbridge	3	2	1	0	10	3	+7	12	Final
2	(Scotland) Kelburne (H)	3	1	1	1	3	6	−3	7	Third place game
3	(Switzerland) Rotweiss Wettingen	3	0	3	0	4	4	0	6	Fifth place game
4	(Belarus) Minsk	3	0	1	2	3	7	−4	3	

Source: EHF
Rules for classification: 1) points; 2) matches won; 3) goal difference; 4) goals for; 5) head-to-head result; 6) field goals for.
(H) Hosts

13 May 2016
15:30

Banbridge (Ireland)	3–2	(Switzerland) Rotweiss Wettingen
	Report

13 May 2016
17:45

Minsk (Belarus)	1–2	(Scotland) Kelburne
	Report

14 May 2016
14:30

Banbridge (Ireland)	4–1	(Belarus) Minsk
	Report

14 May 2016
16:45

Kelburne (Scotland)	1–1	(Switzerland) Rotweiss Wettingen
	Report

15 May 2016
14:30

Minsk (Belarus)	1–1	(Switzerland) Rotweiss Wettingen
	Report

15 May 2016
16:45

Kelburne (Scotland)	0–4	(Ireland) Banbridge
	Report

=== Pool B ===
Pos	Team	Pld	W	D	L	GF	GA	GD	Pts	Qualification
1	(Wales) Cardiff & Met	2	1	1	0	8	1	+7	7	Final
2	(Czech Republic) Slavia Prague	2	1	1	0	7	4	+3	7	Third place game
3	(Italy) Bra	2	0	0	2	3	13	−10	0	Fifth place game

Source: EHF
Rules for classification: 1) points; 2) matches won; 3) goal difference; 4) goals for; 5) head-to-head result; 6) field goals for.

13 May 2016
13:15

Slavia Prague (Czech Republic)	6–3	(Italy) Bra
	Report

14 May 2016
12:15

Bra (Italy)	0–7	(Wales) Cardiff & Met
	Report

15 May 2016
12:15

Slavia Prague (Czech Republic)	1–1	(Wales) Cardiff & Met
	Report

== Classification round ==
=== Fifth place game ===
16 May 2016
10:45

Rotweiss Wettingen (Switzerland)	3–1	(Italy) Bra
	Report

=== Third place game ===
16 May 2016
13:00

Kelburne (Scotland)	3–0	(Czech Republic) Slavia Prague
	Report

=== Final ===
16 May 2016
15:00

Banbridge (Ireland)	0–4	(Wales) Cardiff & Met
	Report

== Final standings ==
1. (Wales) Cardiff & Met
2. (Ireland) Banbridge
3. (Scotland) Kelburne
4. (Czech Republic) Slavia Prague
5. (Switzerland) Rotweiss Wettingen
6. (Italy) Bra
7. (Belarus) Minsk

== See also ==
- 2015–16 Euro Hockey League
- 2016 Women's EuroHockey Club Trophy
