= Weinke =

Weinke is a surname. Notable people with the surname include:

- Chris Weinke (born 1972), American football coach and former football and baseball player
- Ferdinand Weinke (born 1995), German field hockey player
