= 2014 Women's EuroHockey Club Trophy =

Tournament details
- Host country: England
- City: Loughborough
- Dates: 6–9 June
- Teams: 8
- Venue: Leicester Hockey Club

Final positions
- Champions: (England) Leicester (1st title)
- Runner-up: (Russia) Izmaylovo
- Third place: (Ireland) Loreto

Tournament statistics
- Matches played: 16
- Goals scored: 66 (4.13 per match)
- Top scorer(s): (Russia) Marina Fedorova (Russia) Olga Shentsova (5 goals)

The 2014 Women's EuroHockey Club Trophy was the 38th edition of the women's Women's EuroHockey Club Trophy, Europe's secondary club field hockey tournament organized by the EHF. It was held from 6 to 9 June 2014 in Loughborough, England.

Leicester won the tournament after defeating Izmaylovo 2–1 in the final. Loreto finished third, after defeating Complutense 3–2 in penalties after a 1–1 draw.

== Teams ==
- (Belarus) Victorya Smolevichi
- (Belgium) Royal Antwerp
- (England) Leicester
- (Ireland) Loreto
- (Russia) Izmaylovo
- (Russia) Metrostroy
- (Spain) Complutense
- (Ukraine) Sumchanka

== Results ==
=== Preliminary round ===
==== Pool A ====
Pos	Team	Pld	W	D	L	GF	GA	GD	Pts	Qualification
1	(Russia) Izmaylovo	3	3	0	0	14	2	+12	15	Final
2	(Ireland) Loreto	3	2	0	1	7	4	+3	11	
3	(Russia) Metrostroy	3	1	0	2	12	7	+5	6	
4	(Belarus) Victorya Smolevichi	3	0	0	3	0	20	−20	0	

Source: EHF

6 June 2014
10:00

Victorya Smolevichi (Belarus)	0–8	(Russia) Izmaylovo
	Report

Umpires:
Violeta Eismayer (AUT)
Jummai Sule (NGR)

6 June 2014
12:00

Loreto (Ireland)	3–2	(Russia) Metrostroy
Small 8', 35+'; Matthews 28'	Report	Fedorova 40', 58'

Umpires:
Joanna Forrest (ENG)
Sviatlana Karzhevich (BLR)

7 June 2014
11:00

Izmaylovo (Russia)	4–1	(Russia) Metrostroy
	Report

Umpires:
Tatyana Kaltypan (UKR)
Sviatlana Karzhevich (BLR)

7 June 2014
13:00

Loreto (Ireland)	3–0	(Belarus) Victorya Smolevichi
Clarke 35+'; Matthews 56'; Keegan 70+'	Report

Umpires:
Natalia Kadirova (RUS)
Rachel Williams (ENG)

8 June 2014
11:00

Victorya Smolevichi (Belarus)	0–9	(Russia) Metrostroy
	Report

Umpires:
Rachel Williams (ENG)
Jummai Sule (NGR)

8 June 2014
13:00

Izmaylovo (Russia)	2–1	(Ireland) Loreto
Sadovaia 24'; Shamina 28'	Report	Clarke 58'

Umpires:
Celine Martin-Schmets (BEL)
Joanna Forrest (ENG)

==== Pool B ====
Pos	Team	Pld	W	D	L	GF	GA	GD	Pts	Qualification
1	(England) Leicester	3	3	0	0	5	1	+4	15	Final
2	(Spain) Complutense	3	1	1	1	5	5	0	8	
3	(Ukraine) Sumchanka	3	1	0	2	6	3	+3	7	
4	(Belgium) Royal Antwerp	3	0	1	2	4	11	−7	3	

Source: EHF

6 June 2014
16:00

Complutense (Spain)	1–0	(Ukraine) Sumchanka
Riera 6'	Report

Umpires:
Rachel Williams (ENG)
Celine Martin-Schmets (BEL)

6 June 2014
18:00

Leicester (England)	2–0	(Belgium) Royal Antwerp
Hunter 25'; Hawkins 50'	Report

Umpires:
Gillian Garrett (IRE)
Tatyana Kaltypan (UKR)

7 June 2014
15:00

Complutense (Spain)	1–2	(England) Leicester
González Zuñiga 25'	Report	Whitehead 13', 16'

Umpires:
Violeta Eismayer (AUT)
Celine Martin-Schmets (BEL)

7 June 2014
17:00

Royal Antwerp (Belgium)	1–6	(Ukraine) Sumchanka
De Goes 33'	Report	Sitalo 2'; Matviyenko 7', 63'; Ponomarenko 32'; Gulenko 39'; Shatokhina 61'

Umpires:
Jummai Sule (NGR)
Joanna Forrest (ENG)

8 June 2014
15:00

Leicester (England)	1–0	(Ukraine) Sumchanka
Hawkins 31'	Report

Umpires:
Gillian Garrett (IRE)
Violeta Eismayer (AUT)

8 June 2014
17:00

Royal Antwerp (Belgium)	3–3	(Spain) Complutense
Pairon 5'; Gierts 20'; Frederiks 26'	Report	Viton 3'; Riera 43'; Sánchez-Valverde 59'

Umpires:
Natalia Kadirova (RUS)
Tatyana Kaltypan (UKR)

=== Classification round ===
==== Seventh and eighth place ====
9 June 2014
10:00

Victorya Smolevichi (Belarus)	0–6	(Belgium) Royal Antwerp
	Report	Frederiks 16'; Duyck 20'; De Goes 28'; Bouche 32'; Van Strydonck 48'; Gierts 50'

Umpires:
Gillian Garrett (IRE)
Natalia Kadirova (RUS)

==== Fifth and sixth place ====
9 June 2014
12:00

Metrostroy (Russia)	2–0	(Ukraine) Sumchanka
Fedorova 15'; Piotukh 37'	Report

Umpires:
Jummai Sule (NGR)
Sviatlana Karzhevich (BLR)

==== Third and fourth place ====
9 June 2014
15:30

Loreto (Ireland)	1–1	(Spain) Complutense
Mulcahy 56'	Report	Lorenzo 46'
Penalties
Small (penalty shoot-out missed); Meeke (penalty shoot-out missed); Vincent (penalty shoot-out scored); Mulcahy (penalty shoot-out scored); Matthews (penalty shoot-out scored)	3–2	(penalty shoot-out missed) Riera; (penalty shoot-out scored) Sánchez-Valverde; (penalty shoot-out scored) Jiménez; (penalty shoot-out missed) García; (penalty shoot-out missed) Viton

Umpires:
Joanna Forrest (ENG)
Tatyana Kaltypan (UKR)

==== Final ====
9 June 2014
17:30

Izmaylovo (Russia)	1–2	(England) Leicester
Vasileva 3'	Report	Fair 29', 51'

Umpires:
Violeta Eismayer (AUT)
Celine Martin-Schmets (BEL)

== Statistics ==
=== Final standings ===
1. (England) Leicester
2. (Russia) Izmaylovo
3. (Ireland) Loreto
4. (Spain) Complutense
5. (Russia) Metrostroy
6. (Ukraine) Sumchanka
7. (Belgium) Royal Antwerp
8. (Belarus) Victorya Smolevichi
