= 2019 Men's EuroHockey Club Trophy =

Tournament details
- Host country: Switzerland
- City: Wettingen
- Dates: 7–10 June
- Teams: 8
- Venue(s): Rotweiss Wettingen

Final positions
- Champions: (Wales) Cardiff & Met (2nd title)
- Runner-up: (Belarus) Stroitel Brest
- Third place: (Switzerland) Rotweiss Wettingen

Tournament statistics
- Matches played: 16
- Goals scored: 88 (5.5 per match)
- Top scorer(s): (Wales) Jack Pritchard (Ukraine) Maksym Onofriiuk (4 goals)

The 2019 Men's EuroHockey Club Trophy was the 43rd edition of the men's EuroHockey Club Trophy, Europe's secondary club field hockey tournament organized by the EHF. It was held from 7 to 10 June 2019 in Wettingen, Switzerland.

Cardiff & Met won their second title by defeating Stroitel Brest 4–3 in the final. The hosts Rotweiss Wettingen took the bronze medal.

== Teams ==
- (Ireland) Glenanne
- (Wales) Cardiff & Met
- (Switzerland) Rotweiss Wettingen
- (Ukraine) OKS Vinnitsa
- (Belarus) Stroitel Brest
- (Austria) WAC
- (Portugal) Casa Pia
- (Czech Republic) Bohemians Prague

== Results ==
=== Preliminary round ===
==== Pool A ====
Pos	Team	Pld	W	D	L	GF	GA	GD	Pts	Qualification
1	(Belarus) Stroitel Brest	3	2	1	0	14	6	+8	12	Final
2	(Switzerland) Rotweiss Wettingen (H)	3	2	0	1	8	6	+2	11	Third place game
3	(Portugal) Casa Pia	3	1	0	2	7	14	−7	6	Fifth place game
4	(Ireland) Glenanne	3	0	1	2	7	10	−3	4	Seventh place game

Source: EHF
(H) Hosts

7 June 2019
16:30

Glenanne (Ireland)	4–4	(Belarus) Stroitel Brest
	Report

7 June 2019
18:45

Rotweiss Wettingen (Switzerland)	4–3	(Portugal) Casa Pia
	Report

8 June 2019
14:30

Stroitel Brest (Belarus)	8–1	(Portugal) Casa Pia
	Report

8 June 2019
16:45

Rotweiss Wettingen (Switzerland)	3–1	(Ireland) Glenanne
	Report

9 June 2019
14:30

Glenanne (Ireland)	2–3	(Portugal) Casa Pia
	Report

9 June 2019
16:45

Stroitel Brest (Belarus)	2–1	(Switzerland) Rotweiss Wettingen
	Report

==== Pool B ====
Pos	Team	Pld	W	D	L	GF	GA	GD	Pts	Qualification
1	(Wales) Cardiff & Met	3	3	0	0	8	3	+5	15	Final
2	(Ukraine) OKS Vinnitsa	3	1	1	1	8	5	+3	8	Third place game
3	(Austria) WAC	3	0	2	1	4	5	−1	5	Fifth place game
4	(Czech Republic) Bohemians Prague	3	0	1	2	3	10	−7	2	Seventh place game

Source: EHF

7 June 2019
12:00

Cardiff & Met (Wales)	2–1	(Austria) WAC
	Report

7 June 2019
14:15

OKS Vinnitsa (Ukraine)	5–1	(Czech Republic) Bohemians Prague
	Report

8 June 2019
10:00

WAC (Austria)	2–2	(Czech Republic) Bohemians Prague
	Report

8 June 2019
12:15

OKS Vinnitsa (Ukraine)	2–3	(Wales) Cardiff & Met
	Report

9 June 2019
10:00

Cardiff & Met (Wales)	3–0	(Czech Republic) Bohemians Prague
	Report

9 June 2019
12:15

WAC (Austria)	1–1	(Ukraine) OKS Vinnitsa
	Report

=== Classification round ===
==== Seventh and eighth place ====
10 June 2019
08:30

Glenanne (Ireland)	9–3	(Czech Republic) Bohemians Prague
	Report

==== Fifth and sixth place ====
10 June 2019
10:45

Casa Pia (Portugal)	1–2	(Austria) WAC
	Report

==== Third and fourth place ====
10 June 2019
13:00

Rotweiss Wettingen (Switzerland)	4–3	(Ukraine) OKS Vinnitsa
	Report

==== Final ====
10 June 2019
15:15

Stroitel Brest (Belarus)	3–4	(Wales) Cardiff & Met
	Report

== Final standings ==
1. (Wales) Cardiff & Met
2. (Belarus) Stroitel Brest
3. (Switzerland) Rotweiss Wettingen
4. (Ukraine) OKS Vinnitsa
5. (Austria) WAC
6. (Portugal) Casa Pia
7. (Ireland) Glenanne
8. (Czech Republic) Bohemians Prague

== See also ==
- 2019 Women's EuroHockey Club Trophy
- 2018–19 Euro Hockey League
