= 2021 Men's EuroHockey Club Trophy I =

Tournament details
- Host country: Austria
- City: Vienna
- Dates: 30 September – 3 October
- Teams: 6 (from 6 associations)
- Venue: Post SV Wien

Final positions
- Champions: (France) Montrouge (1st title)
- Runner-up: (Austria) Post SV
- Third place: (Switzerland) Rotweiss Wettingen

Tournament statistics
- Matches played: 9
- Goals scored: 38 (4.22 per match)
- Top scorer(s): (Ukraine) Yurii Dzemukh (France) Louis Poupée (4 goals)
- Best player: (France) Louis Poupée

The 2021 Men's EuroHockey Club Trophy I was the 44th edition of Europe's secondary men's club field hockey tournament organized by the European Hockey Federation and the first edition since it was renamed from the EuroHockey Club Trophy to the EuroHockey Club Trophy I. It was held from 30 September to 3 October 2021 at Post SV Wien in Vienna, Austria.

Montrouge won their first title by defeating the hosts Post SV 5–0 in the final. Rotweiss Wettingen won the bronze medal by defeating Stroitel Brest 4–3 in a shoot-out after the match finished 2–2.

== Teams ==
The following six teams with the following seeding participated in the tournament. Cardiff & Met and Western Wildcats withdrew before the tournament.

1. (France) Montrouge
2. (Poland) Pomorzanin Torun
3. (Belarus) Stroitel Brest
4. (Switzerland) Rotweiss Wettingen
5. (Ukraine) OKS Vinnitsa
6. (Austria) Post SV

== Preliminary round ==
=== Pool A ===
Pos	Team	Pld	W	D	L	GF	GA	GD	Pts	Qualification
1	(France) Montrouge	2	2	0	0	5	1	+4	10	Final
2	(Switzerland) Rotweiss Wettingen	2	1	0	1	5	3	+2	6	Third place game
3	(Ukraine) OKS Vinnitsa	2	0	0	2	1	7	−6	0	Fifth place game

Source: EHF
Rules for classification: 1) points; 2) matches won; 3) goal difference; 4) goals for; 5) head-to-head result; 6) field goals for.

30 September 2021
14:15

Montrouge (France)	3–0	(Ukraine) OKS Vinnitsa
Poupée 30'; Bézier 52'; Sellier 57'	Report

Umpires:
Oliver Tarnoczi (AUT)
Lukasz Zwierzchowski (POL)

1 October 2021
13:15

Rotweiss Wettingen (Switzerland)	1–2	(France) Montrouge
Michel 48'	Report	Sellier 13'; Poupée 39'

Umpires:
Pietro Galligani (ITA)
Lukasz Zwierzchowski (POL)

2 October 2021
16:45

OKS Vinnitsa (Ukraine)	1–4	(Switzerland) Rotweiss Wettingen
	Report

Umpires:
Maksim Novikau (BLR)
Oliver Tarnoczi (AUT)

=== Pool B ===
Pos	Team	Pld	W	D	L	GF	GA	GD	Pts	Qualification
1	(Austria) Post SV (H)	2	2	0	0	5	2	+3	10	Final
2	(Belarus) Stroitel Brest	2	1	0	1	4	5	−1	6	Third place game
3	(Poland) Pomorzanin Torun	2	0	0	2	3	5	−2	2	Fifth place game

Source: EHF
Rules for classification: 1) points; 2) matches won; 3) goal difference; 4) goals for; 5) head-to-head result; 6) field goals for.
(H) Hosts

30 September 2021
16:45

Pomorzanin Torun (Poland)	1–2	(Austria) Post SV
	Report

1 October 2021
15:45

Stroitel Brest (Belarus)	3–2	(Poland) Pomorzanin Torun
	Report

2 October 2021
14:15

Post SV (Austria)	3–1	(Belarus) Stroitel Brest
	Report

== Classification round ==
=== Fifth place game ===
3 October 2021
09:30

OKS Vinnitsa (Ukraine)	4–2	(Poland) Pomorzanin Torun
	Report

=== Third place game ===
3 October 2021
12:00

Rotweiss Wettingen (Switzerland)	2–2	(Belarus) Stroitel Brest
	Report
Penalties
	4–3

=== Final ===
3 October 2021
14:30

Montrouge (France)	5–0	(Austria) Post SV
	Report

== Final standings ==
1. (France) Montrouge
2. (Austria) Post SV
3. (Switzerland) Rotweiss Wettingen
4. (Belarus) Stroitel Brest
5. (Ukraine) OKS Vinnitsa
6. (Poland) Pomorzanin Torun

== See also ==
- 2021 Euro Hockey League
- 2021 Men's EuroHockey Club Trophy II
- 2021 Women's EuroHockey Club Trophy
