= 2026 Women's EuroHockey Club Trophy I =

Women's EuroHockey Club Trophy

Tournament details
- Host country: Austria
- City: Vienna
- Dates: 3–6 April
- Teams: 8

Final positions
- Champions: (England) Hampstead & Westminster (2nd title)
- Runner-up: (Ukraine) Sumchanka
- Third place: (France) Saint Germain

Tournament statistics
- Matches played: 16
- Goals scored: 51 (3.19 per match)
- Top scorer(s): Yohanna Lhopital (France) Saint Germain (4 goals)

The 2026 Women's EuroHockey Club Trophy was the 49th edition of the women's Women's EuroHockey Club Trophy, Europe's secondary club field hockey tournament organized by the EHF. It was held from 3 to 6 April 2026 in Vienna, Austria.

== Teams ==
The following eight teams competed for the title:

- (Austria) Wien
- (Czech Republic) Plzeň-Litice
- (England) Hampstead & Westminster
- (France) Lille
- (France) Saint Germain
- (Republic of Ireland) Loreto
- (Italy) Amiscora
- (Ukraine) Sumchanka

== Preliminary round ==
=== Pool A ===
Pos	Team	Pld	W	D	L	GF	GA	GD	Pts	Qualification or relegation
1	(Ukraine) Sumchanka	3	3	0	0	10	3	+7	15	Final
2	(France) Saint Germain	3	2	0	1	8	4	+4	11	Third place match
3	(France) Lille	3	1	0	2	3	4	−1	7	Fifth place match
4	(Italy) Amiscora	3	0	0	3	0	10	−10	3	Seventh place match

Source: EHF
Rules for classification: 1) points; 2) matches won; 3) goal difference; 4) goals for; 5) head-to-head result; 6) field goals for.

3 April 2026
10:30

Sumchanka (Ukraine)	4–0	(Italy) Amiscora
Basanets 30'; Leonova 35'; Movchan 44', 59'	Report

Umpires:
Manouk Bakker (NED)
Sam Church (ENG)

3 April 2026
12:45

Saint Germain (France)	2–0	(France) Lille
Verrier 3'; Lhopital 13'	Report

Umpires:
Una Mihajlović (CRO)
Oliver Brown (IRL)

4 April 2026
10:00

Saint Germain (France)	2–4	(Ukraine) Sumchanka
Cadot 5'; Dumont 13'	Report	Leonova 20', 58'; Zaitseva 51'; Honcharenko 54'

Umpires:
Tommy Croese (BEL)
Jesus Medinilla (ESP)

4 April 2026
12:15

Amiscora (Italy)	0–2	(France) Lille
	Report	Blanquart 33', 43'

Umpires:
Thalia Bellemans (BEL)
Aidan Hankins (SUI)

5 April 2026
10:00

Sumchanka (Ukraine)	2–1	(France) Lille
Honcharenko 40'; Tyshchenko 49'	Report	Fernandez-Merlo 33'

Umpires:
Maya Antia-Frese (GER)
Oliver Brown (IRL)

5 April 2026
12:15

Amiscora (Italy)	0–4	(France) Saint Germain
	Report	Lhopital 24', 31'; Gaspari 25'; Cadot 28'

Umpires:
Manouk Bakker (NED)
Jesus Medinilla (ESP)

=== Pool B ===
Pos	Team	Pld	W	D	L	GF	GA	GD	Pts	Qualification or relegation
1	(England) Hampstead & Westminster	3	3	0	0	6	0	+6	15	Final
2	(Austria) Wien (H)	3	1	1	1	4	4	0	7	Third place match
3	(Republic of Ireland) Loreto	3	1	1	1	3	3	0	7	Fifth place match
4	(Czech Republic) Plzeň-Litice	3	0	0	3	1	8	−7	0	Seventh place match

Source: EHF
Rules for classification: 1) points; 2) matches won; 3) goal difference; 4) goals for; 5) head-to-head result; 6) field goals for.
(H) Hosts

3 April 2026
15:00

Hampstead & Westminster (England)	4–0	(Czech Republic) Plzeň-Litice
Greenwood 16'; L. Hunt 21'; Leigh 38'; De Ledesma 39'	Report

Umpires:
Tommy Croese (BEL)
Aidan Hankins (SUI)

3 April 2026
16:45

Loreto (Republic of Ireland)	1–1	(Austria) Wien
Dunne 22'	Report	Kern 11'

Umpires:
Thalia Bellemans (BEL)
Maya Antia-Frese (GER)

4 April 2026
14:30

Loreto (Republic of Ireland)	0–2	(England) Hampstead & Westminster
	Report	H. Hunt 33'; Burge 59'

Umpires:
Manouk Bakker (NED)
Una Mihajlović (CRO)

4 April 2026
16:45

Plzeň-Litice (Czech Republic)	1–2	(Austria) Wien
L. Duchková 14'	Report	Kern 42'; Haselsteiner 48'

Umpires:
Oliver Brown (IRL)
Sam Church (ENG)

5 April 2026
14:30

Plzeň-Litice (Czech Republic)	0–2	(Republic of Ireland) Loreto
	Report	Kelly 6'; Pratt 52'

Umpires:
Thalia Bellemans (BEL)
Sam Church (ENG)

5 April 2026
16:45

Hampstead & Westminster (England)	2–1	(Austria) Wien
H. Hunt 12'; Burge 14'	Report	Kern 42'

Umpires:
Tommy Croese (BEL)
Una Mihajlović (CRO)

== Classification round ==
=== Seventh and eighth place ===
6 April 2026
09:00

Amiscora (Italy)	3–2	(Czech Republic) Plzeň-Litice
Khilko 20'; Raineri 23'; Di Mauro 53'	Report	L. Duchková 41'; Dolíková 54'

Umpires:
Tommy Croese (BEL)
Aidan Hankins (SUI)

=== Fifth and sixth place ===
6 April 2026
11:15

Lille (France)	2–1	(Republic of Ireland) Loreto
Dewerdt 13'; Watine 51'	Report	O'Brien 36'

Umpires:
Thalia Bellemans (BEL)
Sam Church (ENG)

=== Third and fourth place ===
6 April 2026
13:30

Saint Germain (France)	1–0	(Austria) Wien
Lhopital 9'	Report

Umpires:
Manouk Bakker (NED)
Maya Antia-Frese (GER)

=== Final ===
6 April 2026
15:45

Sumchanka (Ukraine)	2–3	(England) Hampstead & Westminster
Korobkina 8'; Honcharenko 39'	Report	Hamilton 6'; Lench 28'; L. Hunt 36'

Umpires:
Oliver Brown (IRL)
Jesus Medinilla (ESP)

=== Final standings ===
Pos	Team
1st place, gold medalist(s)	(England) Hampstead & Westminster
2nd place, silver medalist(s)	(Ukraine) Sumchanka
3rd place, bronze medalist(s)	(France) Saint Germain
4	(Austria) Wien
5	(France) Lille
6	(Republic of Ireland) Loreto
7	(Italy) Amiscora
8	(Czech Republic) Plzeň-Litice

Source: Eurohockey

== See also ==
- 2026 Men's EuroHockey Club Trophy I
- 2026 Women's Euro Hockey League
