= Gauthier Boccard =

Belgian field hockey player (born 1991)

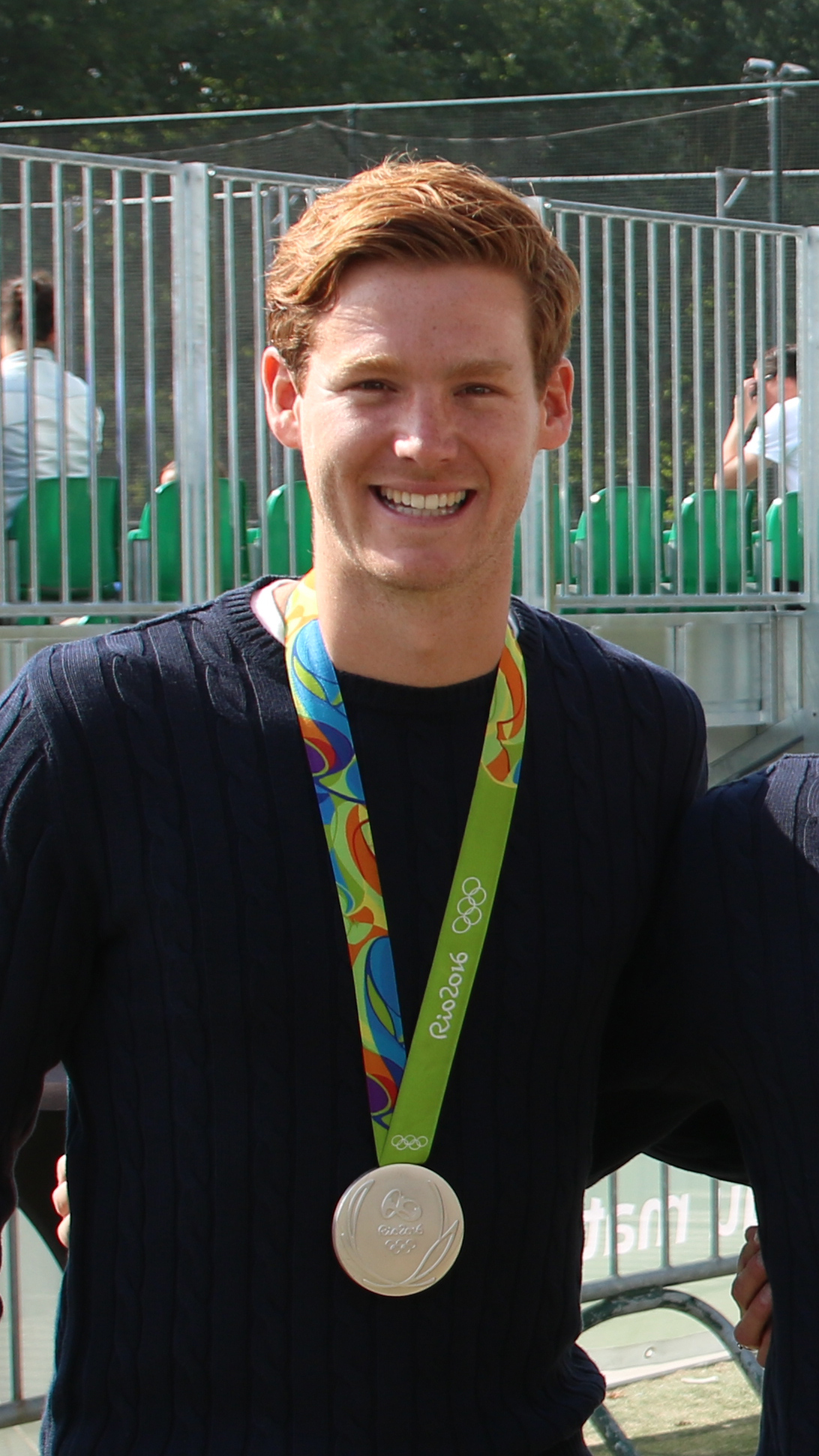
- Boccard in 2016

Personal information
- Born: 26 August 1991 (age 34) Uccle, Belgium
- Height: 1.86 m (6 ft 1 in)
- Weight: 79 kg (174 lb)

Sport
- Sport: Field hockey
- Position: Defender / Midfielder
- Club: Léopold
Youth career
- Team
- –: Orée
Senior career
Years	Team	Caps	Goals
2008–2009	Orée	-	-
2009–2022	Waterloo Ducks	-	-
2022–present	Léopold	-	-
National team
Years	Team	Caps	Goals
2012–2025	Belgium	310	(26)
Medal record
Men's field hockey
Representing Belgium
Olympic Games
Gold medal – first place	2020 Tokyo	Team
Silver medal – second place	2016 Rio de Janeiro	Team
World Cup
Gold medal – first place	2018 Bhubaneswar
Silver medal – second place	2023 Bhubaneswar/Rourkela
EuroHockey Championships
Gold medal – first place	2019 Antwerp
Silver medal – second place	2017 Amstelveen
Bronze medal – third place	2021 Amstelveen
Bronze medal – third place	2023 Mönchengladbach
Hockey World League
Silver medal – second place	2014–15 Raipur	Team

Gauthier Boccard (born 26 August 1991) is a Belgian professional field hockey player who plays as a defender or midfielder for Léopold and the Belgian national team. He played 310 matches for the Belgian national team from 2012 to 2025.

== Club career ==
In the 2018–19 Euro Hockey League, Boccard's Waterloo Ducks became the first Belgian club to win the Euro Hockey League. He also won three national title with the Waterloo Ducks. In March 2022 he signed a four-year contract at Royal Léopold Club from the summer of 2022 onwards.

== International career ==
At the 2012 Summer Olympics, he competed for the national team in the men's tournament. Gauthier Boccard also participated with the Belgium men's national field hockey team at the 2016 Summer Olympics in Rio. The Belgian Red Lions made an impression during these Games, winning the silver medal, and Gauthier Boccard scored one goal. He was a part of the Belgian squad which won Belgium its first World Cup and European title. On 25 May 2021, he was selected in the squad for the 2021 EuroHockey Championship. He was also part of the Belgian squad that won the gold medal at the delayed 2020 Olympics.

== Honours ==
=== Waterloo Ducks ===
- Euro Hockey League: 2018–19
- Belgian Hockey League: 2011–12, 2012–13, 2013–14

=== Belgium ===
- Olympic gold medal: 2020
- Olympic silver medal: 2016
- World Cup: 2018
- EuroHockey Championship: 2019
- FIH Pro League: 2020–21
