= Daniel Kane =

Daniel Kane may refer to:

- Daniel Kane (linguist) (1948–2021), Australian linguist, an expert in Jurchen and Khitan languages
- Dan Kane (Daniel Paul Kane, born 1961), American investigative journalist
- Daniel Kane (mathematician) (born 1986), American mathematician
- Danny Kane (born 1997), Irish professional footballer

== See also ==
- Daniel Caine (disambiguation)
- Daniel Cane, American businessman
