= 2018–19 Euro Hockey League =

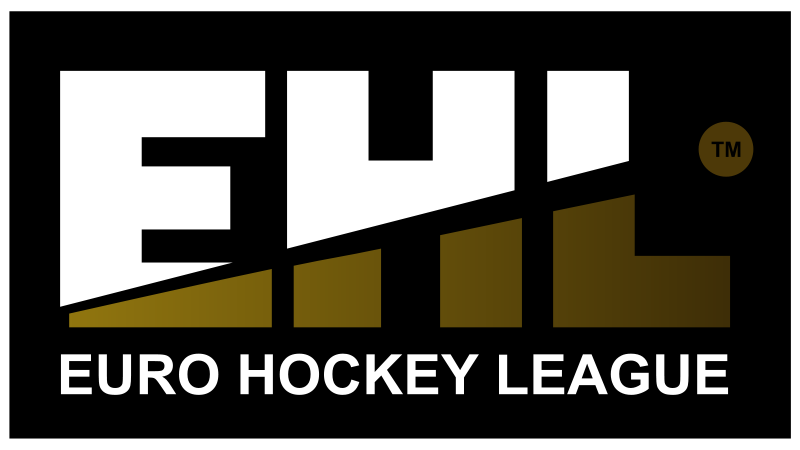

Tournament details
- Dates: 5 October 2018 – 22 April 2019
- Teams: 24 (from 12 associations)
- Venue: 2 (in 2 host cities)

Final positions
- Champions: (Belgium) Waterloo Ducks (1st title)
- Runner-up: (Germany) Rot-Weiss Köln
- Third place: (Germany) Mannheimer HC

Tournament statistics
- Matches played: 32
- Goals scored: 171 (5.34 per match)
- Top scorer: (Argentina) Gonzalo Peillat (9 goals)

The Euro Hockey League 2018–19 was the twelfth season of the Euro Hockey League, Europe's premier club field hockey tournament, organized by the European Hockey Federation. Round One was held in Barcelona from 5 until 7 October 2018 and the knockout stage was held in Eindhoven from 17 until 22 April 2019.

The final was played between Waterloo Ducks and Rot-Weiss Köln. The Waterloo Ducks defeated Rot-Weis Köln 4–0 to become the first Belgian club to win the Euro Hockey League. Mannheimer HC took the bronze medal and Gonzalo Peillat became the top scorer with nine goals.

== Association team allocation ==
Location of teams in 2018–19 Euro Hockey League
Location of Benelux teams in 2018–19 Euro Hockey League

A total of 24 teams from 12 of the 45 EHF member associations participated in the 2018–19 Euro Hockey League. The association ranking based on the EHL country coefficients is used to determine the number of participating teams for each association:

- Associations 1–4 each have three teams qualify.
- Associations 5–8 each have two teams qualify.
- Associations 9–12 each have one team qualify.

=== EHL Rankings ===
Association ranking for 2018–19 Euro Hockey League
Rank	Change	Association	Points	Teams
1	Steady	Netherlands	50.000	3
2	Steady	Germany	33.417	3
3	Steady	Belgium	33.333	3
4	Steady	Spain	28.250	3
5	▲2	France	24.250	2
6	▼1	England	22.000	2
7	▲1	Russia	20.500	2
8	▲1	Scotland	19.125	2
9	▼3	Ireland	18.875	1
10	Steady	Poland	13.625	1
11	Steady	Austria	12.750	1
12	▲3	Belarus	11.375	1
13	▲1	Switzerland	9.125	0
14	▼2	Wales	8.875	0
15	▲2	Ukraine	6.500	0
16	▼3	Italy	6.250	0
17	▼1	Czech Republic	2.125	0

=== Qualified teams ===
The following teams qualified for the 2018-19 Euro Hockey League. 12 teams got a bye to the KO16.

Round One
Champions	Non-champions	
(Ireland) Three Rock Rovers	(Netherlands) Oranje-Rood	Racing France
(Poland) Grunwald Poznań	(Germany) Mannheimer HC	(England) Wimbledon
(Austria) Arminen	(Belgium) Léopold	(Russia) Dinamo Elektrostal
(Belarus) Minsk	(Spain) Junior	(Scotland) Grange

Round of 16
Champions		Non-champions
(Netherlands) Kampong	(France) Saint Germain	(Netherlands) Amsterdam
(Germany) Uhlenhorst Mülheim	(England) Surbiton	(Germany) Rot-Weiss Köln
(Belgium) Dragons	(Russia) Dinamo Kazan	(Belgium) Waterloo Ducks
(Spain) Real Club de Polo	(Scotland) Grove Menzieshill	(Spain) Club Egara

== Format Changes ==
The EHL board has decided not to continue with the field goal equals two trial, used last season, so this season every goal will return to equaling one whether it comes from the field or a penalty corner. Due to the overcrowded international hockey calendar from 2019 onwards because of the 2019 Men's FIH Pro League, the EHL has combined the KO16 and FINAL4 events at Easter, making a six-day event from April 17 to 22, 2019.

== Round One ==
Round One was held from 5 until 7 October 2018 at the Pau Negre Stadium in Barcelona. The draw took place on 17 July 2018. If a game is won, the winning team receives 5 points. A draw results in both teams receiving 2 points. A loss gives the losing team 1 point unless the losing team loses by 3 or more goals, then they receive 0 points.

All times are local, CET (UTC+1).

=== Pool A ===
Pos	Team	Pld	W	D	L	GF	GA	GD	Pts	Qualification
1	(Netherlands) Oranje-Rood	2	2	0	0	8	1	+7	10	Advance to knockout stage
2	(Austria) Arminen	2	1	0	1	5	3	+2	6	
3	(Scotland) Grange	2	0	0	2	1	10	−9	0	

Source: EHF
Rules for classification: 1) points; 2) matches won; 3) goal difference; 4) goals scored; 5) head-to-head result; 6) field goals scored.

5 October 2018
13:30

Arminen (Austria)	4–1	(Scotland) Grange
Ph. Schmidt 4'; Bele 17', 28'; Pa. Schmidt 33'	Report	Tweedie 40'

Pau Negre Stadium, Barcelona
Umpires:
Rob Abbot (IRL)
Laurine Delforge (BEL)

6 October 2018
12:30

Oranje-Rood (Netherlands)	6–0	(Scotland) Grange
Briels 13', 42'; De Voogd 15'; Beins 21'; Martinez 24', 56'	Report

Pau Negre Stadium, Barcelona
Umpires:
Luca Ferrara (ITA)
Tim Meissner (GER)

7 October 2018
11:45

Oranje-Rood (Netherlands)	2–1	(Austria) Arminen
Stanzl 14', 22'	Report	Bele 22'

Pau Negre Stadium, Barcelona
Umpires:
Sean Edwards (ENG)
Michelle Meister (GER)

=== Pool B ===
Pos	Team	Pld	W	D	L	GF	GA	GD	Pts	Qualification
1	(Germany) Mannheimer HC	2	1	1	0	8	3	+5	7	Advance to knockout stage
2	(England) Wimbledon	2	1	1	0	6	3	+3	7	
3	(Russia) Dinamo Elektrostal	2	0	0	2	4	12	−8	0	

Source: EHF
Rules for classification: 1) points; 2) matches won; 3) goal difference; 4) goals scored; 5) head-to-head result; 6) field goals scored.

5 October 2018
18:00

Wimbledon (England)	5–2	(Russia) Dinamo Elektrostal
Malthouse 9'; Lewers 22'; Codling 26'; Sloan 27'; Roper 29'	Report	Dvoretskii 30'; Proskuriakov 50'

Pau Negre Stadium, Barcelona
Umpires:
Tim Meissner (GER)
Andres Ortiz (ESP)

6 October 2018
17:00

Mannheimer HC (Germany)	7–2	(Russia) Dinamo Elektrostal
Peillat 17', 32'; Nguyen 34'; Schües 46'; Barreiros 50'; Vila 53', 60'	Report	Dvoretskii 7'; Larikov 59'

Pau Negre Stadium, Barcelona
Umpires:
Andres Ortix (ES)
Luka Zupancic (AUT)

7 October 2018
14:00

Mannheimer HC (Germany)	1–1	(England) Wimbledon
Peillat 19'	Report	Horler 48'

Pau Negre Stadium, Barcelona
Umpires:
Andres Ortiz (ESP)
Michiel Otten (NED)

=== Pool C ===
Pos	Team	Pld	W	D	L	GF	GA	GD	Pts	Qualification
1	(Belgium) Léopold	2	2	0	0	8	1	+7	10	Advance to knockout stage
2	(Poland) Grunwald Poznań	2	1	0	1	3	4	−1	6	
3	(Belarus) Minsk	2	0	0	2	1	7	−6	1	

Source: EHF
Rules for classification: 1) points; 2) matches won; 3) goal difference; 4) goals scored; 5) head-to-head result; 6) field goals scored.

5 October 2018
11:15

Minsk (Belarus)	1–2	(Poland) Grunwald Poznań
Kochkin 58'	Report	Hulboj 13'; Mikula 56'

Pau Negre Stadium, Barcelona
Umpires:
Luca Ferrara (ITA)
Michelle Meister (GER)

6 October 2018
10:15

Léopold (Belgium)	3–1	(Poland) Grunwald Poznań
Russell 5', 19'; Zimmer 25'	Report	Mikula 56'

Pau Negre Stadium, Barcelona
Umpires:
Sean Edwards (ENG)
Alex Fedenczuk (SCO)

7 October 2018
9:30

Léopold (Belgium)	5–0	(Belarus) Minsk
Russell 33'; Degroote 46', 59'; Baumgarten 49', 59'	Report

Pau Negre Stadium, Barcelona
Umpires:
Rob Abbott (IRL)
Alex Fedenczuk (SCO)

=== Pool D ===
Pos	Team	Pld	W	D	L	GF	GA	GD	Pts	Qualification
1	(Ireland) Three Rock Rovers	2	1	1	0	7	1	+6	7	Advance to knockout stage
2	(Spain) Junior	2	1	1	0	6	2	+4	7	
3	Racing Club de France	2	0	0	2	1	11	−10	0	

Source: EHF
Rules for classification: 1) points; 2) matches won; 3) goal difference; 4) goals scored; 5) head-to-head result; 6) field goals scored.

5 October 2018
15:45

Racing Club de France	0–6	(Ireland) Three Rock Rovers
	Report	Empey 27'; Walsh 36'; Darling 50', 52'; English 56'; Canning 57'

Pau Negre Stadium, Barcelona
Umpires:
Sean Edwards (ENG)
Luka Zupancic (AUT)

6 October 2018
14:45

Junior (Spain)	1–1	(Ireland) Three Rock Rovers
Enrique 53'	Report	Madeley 59'

Pau Negre Stadium, Barcelona
Umpires:
Laurine Delforge (BEL)
Michiel Otten (NED)

7 October 2018
16:15

Junior (Spain)	5–1	Racing Club de France
J. Garcia 2'; Dabanch 13'; Gil 22'; Mari 47'; L. Garcia 53'	Report	Fouquet 52'

Pau Negre Stadium, Barcelona
Umpires:
Laurine Belforge (BEL)
Tim Meissner (GER)

== Knockout stage ==
The knockout stage took place at Sportpark Aalsterweg in Eindhoven, Netherlands from 17 until 22 April 2019. The draw took place at 21 October 2018 and the schedule was announced on 15 November 2018.

All times are local, CET (UTC+1).

=== Qualified teams ===
The knockout phase involves 16 teams, consisting of the 4 pool winners and the 12 already qualified teams.

Champions (seeded in round of 16 draw)	Non-champions and pool winners (unseeded in round of 16 draw)
(Netherlands) Kampong	(Netherlands) Amsterdam
(Germany) Uhlenhorst Mülheim	(Germany) Rot-Weiss Köln
(Belgium) Dragons	(Belgium) Waterloo Ducks
(Spain) Real Club de Polo	(Spain) Club Egara
(France) Saint Germain	(Netherlands) Oranje-Rood
(England) Surbiton	(Germany) Mannheimer HC
(Russia) Dinamo Kazan	(Belgium) Léopold
(Scotland) Grove Menzieshill	(Ireland) Three Rock Rovers

=== Bracket ===
Round of 16
17 April
(Belgium) Dragons	4
(Ireland) Three Rock Rovers	2
17 April
(Belgium) Waterloo Ducks (s.o.)	1 (4)
(England) Surbiton	1 (2)
17 April
(Russia) Dinamo Kazan	0
(Germany) Mannheimer HC	6
17 April
(Netherlands) Oranje-Rood	2
(Germany) Uhlenhorst Mülheim	3
18 April
(Netherlands) Kampong	2
(Germany) Rot-Weiss Köln	3
18 April
(Netherlands) Amsterdam	12
(Scotland) Grove Menzieshill	1
18 April
(France) Saint Germain	1 (1)
(Spain) Club Egara (s.o.)	1 (2)
18 April
(Belgium) Léopold	3
(Spain) Real Club de Polo	4

Quarter-finals
20 April
(Belgium) Dragons	1 (2)
(Belgium) Waterloo Ducks (s.o.)	1 (3)
20 April
(Germany) Mannheimer HC (s.o.)	4 (4)
(Germany) Uhlenhorst Mülheim	4 (2)
20 April
(Germany) Rot-Weiss Köln (s.o.)	2 (6)
(Netherlands) Amsterdam	2 (5)
20 April
(Spain) Club Egara	3 (0)
(Spain) Real Club de Polo (s.o.)	3 (3)

Semi-finals
21 April
(Belgium) Waterloo Ducks (s.o.)	1 (3)
(Germany) Mannheimer HC	1 (1)
21 April
(Germany) Rot-Weiss Köln	3
(Spain) Real Club de Polo	1

Final
22 April
(Belgium) Waterloo Ducks	4
(Germany) Rot-Weiss Köln	0
Bronze medal match
22 April
(Germany) Mannheimer HC	3
(Spain) Real Club de Polo	1

=== Round of 16 ===
17 April 2019
12:45

Dinamo Kazan (Russia)	0–6	(Germany) Mannheimer HC
	Report	Peillat 13', 19', 55'; Vila 17'; Schües 41'; Holste 45'

Sportpark Aalsterweg, Eindhoven
Umpires:
Sebastien Michielsen (BEL)
Coen van Bunge (NED)

17 April 2019
15:00

Dragons (Belgium)	4–2	(Ireland) Three Rock Rovers
Raes 12'; O'Donoghue 22'; Van Aubel 44'; Denayer 46'	Report	Hosking 22'; Morris 35'

Sportpark Aalsterweg, Eindhoven
Umpires:
Christian Blasch (GER)
David Sweetman (SCO)

17 April 2019
17:15

Waterloo Ducks (Belgium)	1–1	(England) Surbiton
Pangrazio 26'	Report	Goodfield 23'
Penalties
Boccard (penalty shoot-out scored); Gougnard (penalty shoot-out missed); Van Straaten (penalty shoot-out scored); Dohmen (penalty shoot-out scored); Penelle (penalty shoot-out scored)	4–2	(penalty shoot-out missed) Drayton Chana; (penalty shoot-out missed) Wallace; (penalty shoot-out scored) Forsyth; (penalty shoot-out scored) Goodfield

Sportpark Aalsterweg, Eindhoven
Umpires:
Ben Goentgen (GER)
Fraser Bell (SCO)

17 April 2019
19:30

Oranje-Rood (Netherlands)	2–3	(Germany) Uhlenhorst Mülheim
Van der Weerden 22'; De Voogd 43'	Report	Schiffer 3'; Herzbruch 35', 51'

Sportpark Aalsterweg, Eindhoven
Umpires:
Dan Barstow (ENG)
Francisco Vazquez Lopez (ESP)

18 April 2019
12:45

Saint Germain (France)	1–1	(Spain) Club Egara
Rogeau 36'	Report	Aura 8'
Penalties
T. Genestet (penalty shoot-out scored); Gohlke (penalty shoot-out missed); F. Goyet (penalty shoot-out missed); Mercurio (penalty shoot-out missed); Pauchet (penalty shoot-out missed)	1–2	(penalty shoot-out scored) Ruiz; (penalty shoot-out missed) Divorra; (penalty shoot-out scored) Clapés; (penalty shoot-out missed) P. Gispert; (penalty shoot-out missed) Romeu

Sportpark Aalsterweg, Eindhoven
Umpires:
Fraser Bell (SCO)
Christian Blasch (GER)

18 April 2019
15:00

Léopold (Belgium)	3–4	(Spain) Real Club de Polo
Cuvelier 25'; Russell 39'; A. Verdussen 43'	Report	A. Reyne 13', 22'; Llorens 45'; Rey 59'

Sportpark Aalsterweg, Eindhoven
Umpires:
Coen van Bunge (NED)
Michiel Otten (NED)

18 April 2019
17:15

Amsterdam (Netherlands)	12–1	(Scotland) Grove Menzieshill
Reid-Ross 5', 17', 25'; Burkhardt 20', 45', 49'; Pruyser 22', 32', 56'; Verga 39'; Hiebendaal 39'; Van Kan 57'	Report	J. Golden 31'

Sportpark Aalsterweg, Eindhoven
Umpires:
Ben Goentgen (GER)
Sebastien Michielsen (BEL)

18 April 2019
19:30

Kampong (Netherlands)	2–3	(Germany) Rot-Weiss Köln
Janssen 29'; Havenga 55'	Report	T. Grambusch 34'; M. Grambusch 51', 60'

Sportpark Aalsterweg, Eindhoven
Umpires:
Bruce Bale (ENG)
Francisco Vazquez Lopez (ESP)

=== Ranking matches ===
19 April 2019
12:45

Three Rock Rovers (Ireland)	1–4	(England) Surbiton
Darling 6'	Report	Taylor 26', 30'; Goodfield 35'; Forsyth 54'

Sportpark Aalsterweg, Eindhoven
Umpires:
Ben Goentgen (GER)
Coen van Bunge (NED)

19 April 2019
15:00

Saint Germain (France)	1–7	(Belgium) Léopold
M. Genestet 1'	Report	Russell 2', 44', 45'; Englebert 15', 37'; Baumgarten 48'; Muschs 52'

Sportpark Aalsterweg, Eindhoven
Umpires:
Michiel Otten (NED)
Christian Blasch (GER)

19 April 2019
17:15

Dinamo Kazan (Russia)	2–6	(Netherlands) Oranje-Rood
Mahmood 2'; Shan 27'	Report	Beins 1'; Van de Venne 7', 9', 45'; Van der Weerden 29', 54'

Sportpark Aalsterweg, Eindhoven
Umpires:
David Sweetman (SCO)
Fraser Bell (SCO)

19 April 2019
19:30

Kampong (Netherlands)	12–0	(Scotland) Grove Menzieshill
Meulenbroek 5', 25', 43'; Lageman 11'; Visser 14', 30', 54', 56'; Kropholler 15'; Havenga 26', 49'	Report

Sportpark Aalsterweg, Eindhoven
Umpires:
Bruce Bale (ENG)
Dan Barstow (ENG)

=== Quarter-finals ===
20 April 2019
09:30

Mannheimer HC (Germany)	4–4	(Germany) Uhlenhorst Mülheim
Vila 6', 29'; Haase 13', 50'	Report	Windfeder 17', 27', 35', 53'
Penalties
Fischer (penalty shoot-out scored); Harris (penalty shoot-out scored); Hinrichs (penalty shoot-out scored); Barreiros (penalty shoot-out scored)	4–2	(penalty shoot-out missed) Bosserhoff; (penalty shoot-out scored) Herzbruch; (penalty shoot-out scored) Pereira; (penalty shoot-out missed) Weinke

Sportpark Aalsterweg, Eindhoven
Umpires:
Coen van Bunge (NED)
Sebastien Michielsen (BEL)

20 April 2019
11:45

Dragons (Belgium)	1–1	(Belgium) Waterloo Ducks
Rubens 56'	Report	Boccard 37'
Penalties
Van Aubel (penalty shoot-out scored); Denayer (penalty shoot-out missed); Rubens (penalty shoot-out scored); O'Donoghue (penalty shoot-out missed); Raes (penalty shoot-out missed)	2–3	(penalty shoot-out missed) Boccard; (penalty shoot-out scored) Dohmen; (penalty shoot-out scored) Van Straaten; (penalty shoot-out scored) Dohmen

Sportpark Aalsterweg, Eindhoven
Umpires:
Ben Goentgen (GER)
Michiel Otten (NED)

20 April 2019
14:00

Club Egara (Spain)	3–3	(Spain) Real Club de Polo
Romeu 5'; Mercadé 35', 48'	Report	Alegre 37', 53'; Oliva 51'
Penalties
Ruiz (penalty shoot-out missed); Farrés-Palet (penalty shoot-out missed); Clapés (penalty shoot-out missed)	0–3	(penalty shoot-out scored) Oliva; (penalty shoot-out scored) Alegre; (penalty shoot-out scored) Llorens

Sportpark Aalsterweg, Eindhoven
Umpires:
Christian Blasch (GER)
Dan Barstow (ENG)

20 April 2019
16:15

Rot-Weiss Köln (Germany)	2–2	(Netherlands) Amsterdam
Große 35'; Rühr 47'	Report	Pruyser 52'; Verga 54'
Penalties
Große (penalty shoot-out scored); M. Grambusch (penalty shoot-out scored); Rühr (penalty shoot-out scored); Miltkau (penalty shoot-out missed); Prinz (penalty shoot-out scored); M. Grambusch (penalty shoot-out missed); Rühr (penalty shoot-out scored); Rühr (penalty shoot-out scored)	6–5	(penalty shoot-out scored) Verga; (penalty shoot-out missed) Bakker; (penalty shoot-out scored) Hiebendaal; (penalty shoot-out scored) Rohof; (penalty shoot-out scored) Pruyser; (penalty shoot-out missed) Pruyser; (penalty shoot-out scored) Verga; (penalty shoot-out missed) Hiebendaal

Sportpark Aalsterweg, Eindhoven
Umpires:
Bruce Bale (ENG)
Francisco Vazquez Lopez (ESP)

=== Semi-finals ===
21 April 2019
13:00

Waterloo Ducks (Belgium)	1–1	(Germany) Mannheimer HC
Ghislain 59'	Report	Peillat 60'
Penalties
Boccard (penalty shoot-out missed); Gougnard (penalty shoot-out missed); Van Straaten (penalty shoot-out scored); Dohmen (penalty shoot-out scored); Penelle (penalty shoot-out scored)	3–1	(penalty shoot-out missed) Fischer; (penalty shoot-out missed) Harris; (penalty shoot-out missed) Hinrichs; (penalty shoot-out scored) Barreiros

Sportpark Aalsterweg, Eindhoven
Umpires:
Francisco Vazquez Lopez (ESP)
Coen van Bunge (NED)

21 April 2019
15:15

Real Club de Polo (Spain)	1–3	(Germany) Rot-Weiss Köln
L. Baron 22'	Report	Rühr 14'; T. Grambusch 32', 40'

Sportpark Aalsterweg, Eindhoven
Umpires:
Bruce Bale (ENG)
Dan Barstow (ENG)

=== Bronze medal match ===
22 April 2019
13:00

Mannheimer HC (Germany)	3–1	(Spain) Real Club de Polo
Peillat 33', 51'; Haase	Report	L. Baron 50'

Sportpark Aalsterweg, Eindhoven
Umpires:
Michiel Otten (NED)
Sebastien Michielsen (BEL)

=== Final ===
22 April 2019
15:15

Waterloo Ducks (Belgium)	4–0	(Germany) Rot-Weiss Köln
Ghislain 42'; Boccard 58'; Bertrand 60'; Van Lierde 60'	Report

Sportpark Aalsterweg, Eindhoven
Umpires:
Dan Barstow (ENG)
Coen van Bunge (NED)

== See also ==
- 2019 EuroHockey Club Champions Cup
- 2019 Men's EuroHockey Club Trophy
- 2019 Men's EuroHockey Indoor Club Cup
