= 2018 Women's EuroHockey Club Trophy =

Women's EuroHockey Club Trophy

Tournament details
- Host country: Ireland
- City: Dún Laoghaire–Rathdown
- Dates: 18–21 May
- Teams: 8
- Venue: Monkstown Hockey Club

Final positions
- Champions: (England) Holcombe (1st title)
- Runner-up: (Spain) Junior
- Third place: (Belarus) Grodno

Tournament statistics
- Matches played: 16
- Goals scored: 87 (5.44 per match)
- Top scorer(s): (Belarus) Yuliya Kurhanskaya (Russia) Bogdana Sadovaia (5 goals)

The 2018 Women's EuroHockey Club Trophy was the 42nd edition of the women's Women's EuroHockey Club Trophy, Europe's secondary club field hockey tournament organized by the EHF. It was held from 18 to 21 May 2018 at Monkstown Hockey Club in Dún Laoghaire–Rathdown, Ireland.

Holcombe won the tournament after defeating Junior 4–2 in penalties after the final finished a 1–1 draw. Grodno finished third, after defeating Krylatskoye 5–4 in the third place playoff.

== Teams ==
- (Belarus) Grodno
- (Czech Republic) Prague
- (England) Holcombe
- (France) Lille
- (Ireland) Monkstown
- (Russia) Krylatskoye
- (Spain) Junior
- (Ukraine) Sumchanka

== Results ==
=== Preliminary round ===
==== Pool A ====
Pos	Team	Pld	W	D	L	GF	GA	GD	Pts	Qualification
1	(England) Holcombe	3	3	0	0	15	2	+13	15	Final
2	(Belarus) Grodno	3	1	1	1	11	10	+1	7	
3	(Ukraine) Sumchanka	3	1	1	1	7	8	−1	7	
4	(Czech Republic) Prague	3	0	0	3	4	17	−13	0	

Source: EHF

18 May 2018
11:00

Holcombe (England)	4–0	(Ukraine) Sumchanka
McEwan 18'; Lewis 30'; Bingham 41'; Elliott 51'	Report

Umpires:
Celine Martin-Schmets (BEL)
Anastasia Bogolyubova (RUS)

18 May 2018
13:15

Grodno (Belarus)	6–3	(Czech Republic) Prague
Kurhanskaya 1', 32', 36'; Silitskaya 20'; Shyntar 51'; Slivinskaya 56'	Report	Lehovcová 6'; Mejzlíková 40'; Kučerová 60'

Umpires:
Lisette Baljon (FRA)
Fiona Davitt (IRE)

19 May 2018
10:00

Sumchanka (Ukraine)	4–1	(Czech Republic) Prague
Shevchenko 28'; Honcharenko 29'; Ponomarenko 47'; Kurovska 57'	Report	Nováková 14'

Umpires:
Sviatlana Karzhevich (BLR)
Anastasia Bogolyubova (RUS)

19 May 2018
12:15

Grodno (Belarus)	2–4	(England) Holcombe
Skurat 13'; Belavusava 13'	Report	Jones 2', 26'; Westwood 11'; McEwan 58'

Umpires:
Lelia Sacre (CAN)
Fiona Davitt (IRE)

20 May 2018
10:00

Holcombe (England)	7–0	(Czech Republic) Prague
Chamberlain 6', 23'; Jones 9'; Watton 10'; Randall 12', 22', 32'	Report

Umpires:
Sviatlana Arutionova (UKR)
Celine Martin-Schmets (BEL)

20 May 2018
12:15

Sumchanka (Ukraine)	3–3	(Belarus) Grodno
Stetsenko 17', 40', 55'	Report	Skurat 6'; Bahushevich 28'; Kurhanskaya 42'

Umpires:
Mariela Fernández (ESP)
Lisette Baljon (FRA)

==== Pool B ====
Pos	Team	Pld	W	D	L	GF	GA	GD	Pts	Qualification
1	(Spain) Junior	3	3	0	0	14	1	+13	15	Final
2	(Russia) Krylatskoye	3	2	0	1	8	8	0	10	
3	(Ireland) Monkstown (H)	3	1	0	2	3	7	−4	5	
4	(France) Lille	3	0	0	3	5	14	−9	0	

Source: EHF
(H) Hosts

18 May 2018
15:30

Junior (Spain)	7–0	(France) Lille
Guinea 20', 50'; Codina 25', 28', 44'; García 37'; Serrahima 38'	Report

Umpires:
Sviatlana Arutionova (UKR)
Rachel Williams (ENG)

18 May 2018
17:45

Krylatskoye (Russia)	3–0	(Ireland) Monkstown
Sadovaia 18'; Khalimova 53'; Shaburova 59'	Report

Umpires:
Lelia Sacre (CAN)
Mariela Fernández (ESP)

19 May 2018
14:30

Monkstown (Ireland)	3–2	(France) Lille
Esteves 9'; Hoban-Logan 35'; Carrigan 44'	Report	Han 8'; Canon 37'

Umpires:
Stepanka Smidová (CZE)
Mariela Fernández (ESP)

19 May 2018
16:45

Junior (Spain)	5–1	(Russia) Krylatskoye
Serrahima 1'; García 9'; Petchamé 25'; Codina 45+'; A. Riba 38'	Report	Sadovaia 47'

Umpires:
Celine Martin-Schmets (BEL)
Lisette Baljon (NED)

20 May 2018
14:30

Monkstown (Ireland)	0–2	(Spain) Junior
	Report	Gil 11', 57'

Umpires:
Stepanka Smidová (CZE)
Rachel Williams (ENG)

20 May 2018
16:45

Krylatskoye (Russia)	4–3	(France) Lille
Kazakova 10'; Leonova 23'; Shaburova 36'; Diagileva 45'	Report	Hannebicque-Leman 6'; Delannoy 12'; Han 35'

Umpires:
Lelia Sacre (CAN)
Sviatlana Karzhevich (BLR)

=== Classification round ===
==== Seventh and eighth place ====
21 May 2018
08:30

Prague (Czech Republic)	5–3	(France) Lille
Lehovcová 18', 36'; Mejzlíková 20'; Babická 40'; Kleinová 59'	Report	Han 24', 39'; Elharouni 39'

Umpires:
Sviatlina Karzhevich (BLR)
Lisette Baljon (NED)

==== Fifth and sixth place ====
21 May 2018
10:45

Sumchanka (Ukraine)	0–1	(Ireland) Monkstown
	Report	Esteves 14'

Umpires:
Anastasia Bogolyubova (RUS)
Stepanka Smidová (CZE)

==== Third and fourth place ====
21 May 2018
13:00

Grodno (Belarus)	5–4	(Russia) Krylatskoye
Mazyrka 5'; Kurhanskaya 8'; Bahushevich 25'; Shyntar 30'; Silitskaya 33'	Report	Sadovaia 11', 33', 60'; Diagileva 44'

Umpires:
Rachel Williams (ENG)
Fiona Davitt (IRE)

==== Final ====
21 May 2018
15:15

Holcombe (England)	1–1	(Spain) Junior
Wilkinson 27'	Report	Piris 33'
Penalties
Elliott (penalty shoot-out scored); Jones (penalty shoot-out scored); Watton (penalty shoot-out scored); Lewis (penalty shoot-out missed); Bingham (penalty shoot-out scored)	4–2	(penalty shoot-out missed) Petchamé; (penalty shoot-out scored) Grau; (penalty shoot-out missed) Guinea; (penalty shoot-out scored) Queralt

Umpires:
Celine Martin-Schmets (BEL)
Lelia Sacre (CAN)

== Statistics ==
=== Final standings ===
Pos	Team	Pld	W	D	L	GF	GA	GD	Pts	Final Result
1st place, gold medalist(s)	(England) Holcombe	4	3	1	0	16	3	+13	17	Gold Medal
2nd place, silver medalist(s)	(Spain) Junior	4	3	1	0	15	2	+13	17	Silver Medal
3rd place, bronze medalist(s)	(Belarus) Grodno	4	2	1	1	16	14	+2	12	Bronze Medal
4	(Russia) Krylatskoye	4	2	0	2	12	13	−1	10	Fourth Place
5	(Ireland) Monkstown (H)	4	2	0	2	4	7	−3	10	Fifth place
6	(Ukraine) Sumchanka	4	1	1	2	7	9	−2	7	Sixth Place
7	(Czech Republic) Prague	4	1	0	3	9	20	−11	5	Seventh Place
8	(France) Lille	4	0	0	4	8	19	−11	0	Eighth Place

Source: EHF
(H) Hosts
