= Women's EuroHockey Club Trophy I =

EuroHockey Club Trophy
- Sport: Field Hockey
- Founded: 1983
- No. of teams: 8
- Continent: Europe
- Most recent champion: (England) Hampstead & Westminster (2026) (2nd title)
- Most titles: (Ireland) Pegasus HC (3 titles)
- Website: eurohockey.org

The Women's EuroHockey Club Trophy is an annual field hockey tournament organised by the European Hockey Federation. It is Europe's secondary club hockey tournament for women, behind the Euro Hockey League Women.

== History ==
The tournament was founded in 1983, with an inaugural tournament played out in the same year. The first champions were English club, Slough.

Since its founding, the tournament has been played out every year in the months from April to June.

== Competition format ==
=== Structure ===
Each edition of the Women's EuroHockey Club Trophy comprises eight teams. The teams are split into two pools of four, playing in a single round-robin format. At the conclusion of the pool stage, the top ranked teams of each pool contest the final of the tournament, while the second placed teams playoff for third; the same continues for fifth and seventh places.

=== Point System ===
Unlike the classic points system of three points for a win, one point for a draw and no points for a loss, this tournament adapts a unique points system. The point allocation for wins, draws and losses is as follows:

- 5 Points: win.
- 2 Points: draw.
- 1 Point: loss.
- 0 Points: loss by 3+ goals.

== Results ==
=== Summaries ===
==== 1980s ====
Year	Location				
Year	Location	Winner	Runner-up	Third place	Fourth place
1983	Paris, France	(England); Slough HC	(Wales); Swansea HC	(Spain); Atlètic Terrassa	(France); Stade Français
1984	Glasgow, Scotland	(Scotland); Glasgow HC	(Ireland); Portadown HC	(France); Amiens HC	(Austria); SV Arminen
1985	Madrid, Spain	(Wales); Swansea HC	(France); Amiens HC	(Spain); Club de Campo	(Austria); SV Arminen
1986	Terrassa, Spain	(Spain); Atlètic Terrassa	(Belgium); Royal Uccle	(Socialist Federal Republic of Yugoslavia); Śląskiego HC	(Austria); SV Arminen
1987	Katowice, Poland	(Wales); Cwmbran HC	(France); Stade Français	(Czechoslovakia); Slavia Prague	(Switzerland); Rot-Weiss Wettingen
1988	Gothenburg, Sweden	(Ireland); Pegasus HC	(Belgium); Rasante HC	(Spain); Club de Campo	(Czechoslovakia); Vyšehrad HC
1989	Swansea, Wales	(Wales); Swansea HC	(Spain); Club de Campo	(France); Stade Français	(Czechoslovakia); Slavia Prague

==== 1990s ====
Year	Location				
Year	Location	Winner	Runner-up	Third place	Fourth place
1990	Vienna, Austria	(France); Stade Français	(Belgium); Royal Uccle	(Italy); Fem EUR	(Czechoslovakia); Slavia Prague
1991	Leverkusen, Germany	(Germany); RTHC Leverkusen	(England); Slough HC	(Wales); Swansea HC	(Italy); CUS Catania
1992	Moscow, Russia	(Soviet Union); Kolos Borispol	(Belgium); Rasante HC	(Wales); Swansea HC	(Austria); Wiener AC
1993	Catania, Italy	(Italy); CUS Catania	(Lithuania); Taurus Eurovil	(Ireland); Muckross HC	(Czech Republic); Meteor České Budějovice
1994	Bratislava, Slovakia	(Ireland); Randalstown HC	(Wales); Swansea HC	(Czech Republic); Meteor České Budějovice	(Austria); Wiener AC
1995	San Sebastián, Portugal	(Portugal); CA San Sebastián	(Austria); Wiener AC	(Russia); Donc Volgodonsk	(Slovakia); Lokomotive Raca
1996	Prague, Czech Republic	(Russia); Volgodonsk HC	(France); Amiens HC	(Belarus); GHC Ritm Grodno	(Czech Republic); Slavia Prague
1997	Catania, Italy	(Italy); CUS Catania	(Ukraine); Dinamo Sumy	(Belarus); GHC Ritm Grodno	(Czech Republic); Slavia Prague
1998	Cardiff, Wales	(Belarus); GHC Ritm Grodno	(Czech Republic); Slavia Prague	(Ireland); Muckross HC	(Wales); Swansea HC
1999	Milan, Italy	(Ireland); Pegasus HC	(France); Stade Français	(Lithuania); Gintra Siauliai	(Belgium); KHC Leuven

==== 2000s ====
Year	Location				
Year	Location	Winner	Runner-up	Third place	Fourth place
2000	Prague, Czech Republic	(Russia); Moskav Pravda	(Spain); Real Sociedad	(Lithuania); Gintra Siauliai	(Wales); Swansea HC
2001	Prague, Czech Republic	(Lithuania); Gintra Siauliai	(Czech Republic); Slavia Prague	(France); Cambrai HC	(Ireland); Pegasus HC
2002	Vienna, Austria	(Scotland); Bonagrass Grove HC	(Ireland); Pegasus HC	(Belarus); GHC Ritm Grodno	(France); Cambrai HC
2003	Lille, France	(Spain); Atlètic Terrassa	(Belarus); GHC Ritm Grodno	(France); Lille MHC	(Italy); Libertas San Saba
2004	Baku, Azerbaijan	(Azerbaijan); Atasport	(Russia); Volga Telecom	(Ireland); Hermes HC	(Belgium); Royal Victory HC
2005	Dublin, Ireland	(Ireland); Hermes HC	(Belarus); GHC Ritm Grodno	(Belgium); Royal Léopold HC	(Czech Republic); Slavia Prague
2006	Prague, Czech Republic	(Russia); Volga Telecom	(Ukraine); Kolos Borispol	(Italy); Libertas San Saba	(Lithuania); Gintra Siauliai
2007	Swansea, Wales	(Spain); Club de Polo	(Lithuania); HC GintraStrekte-Universitetas	(Ireland); Hermes HC	(Italy); HC Mori Villafranca
2008	Rakovník, Czech Republic	(Ukraine); Dinamo Sumchanka	(Belgium); Royal Antwerp HC	(Ireland); Pegasus HC	(Italy); HF Lorenzoni
2009	Wettingen, Switzerland	(Lithuania); Gintra Siauliai	(Italy); HC Mori Villafranca	(Ireland); Hermes HC	(Scotland); Glasgow Western HC

==== 2010s ====
Year	Location				
Year	Location	Winner	Runner-up	Third place	Fourth place
2010	Rome, Italy	(Belarus); GHC Ritm Grodno	(Belgium); ARA Gantoise	(Russia); CSP Izmaylova	(Italy); Libertas San Saba
2011	Rome, Italy	(Belarus); Victorya Smolevichi	(Belgium); Royal Wellington HC	(Ireland); Railway Union HC	(Scotland); Grove Menzieshill HC
2012	Belfast, Northern Ireland	(Ireland); Pegasus HC	(Ukraine); MSC Sumchanka	(Belarus); Victorya Smolevichi	(Russia); HC Metrostroy
2013	Antwerp, Belgium	(England); Reading HC	(Spain); Real Sociedad	(Ireland); Railway Union HC	(Russia); CSP Izmaylovo
2014	Loughborough, England	(England); Leicester HC	(Russia); CSP Izmaylovo	(Ireland); Loreto HC	(Spain); SPV Complutense
2015	Minsk, Belarus	(Germany); UHC Hamburg	(Belgium); Royal Wellington HC	(Belarus); HC Minsk	(Azerbaijan); Atasport
2016	Barcelona, Spain	(Germany); Rot-Weiss Köln	(Belgium); Royal Antwerp HC	(Belarus); HC Minsk	(Spain); Club de Polo
2017	Munich, Germany	(Germany); Münchner SC	(Spain); Club de Campo	(Belarus); HC Minsk	(Belarus); GHC Ritm Grodno
2018	Dublin, Ireland	(England); Holcombe HC	(Spain); Junior F.C.	(Belarus); GHC Ritm Grodno	(Russia); CSP Krylatskoye
2019	Rochester, England	(Spain); Club de Campo	(England); Holcombe HC	(Belgium); Waterloo Ducks HC	(Ireland); UCD Ladies' HC

==== 2020s ====
Year	Location				
Year	Location	Winner	Runner-up	Third place	Fourth place
2021	Lille, France	(Belgium); Gantoise	(Spain); Sanse Complutense	(Belgium); Braxgata	(England); East Grinstead
2022	Cernusco sul Naviglio, Italy	(Belgium); Dragons	(Germany); Mannheimer	(England); East Grinstead	(Italy); Argentia
2023	Wettingen, Switzerland	(Belgium); Dragons	(Germany); Mannheimer	(England); Hampstead & Westminster	(Ukraine); Sumchanka
2024	Hamburg, Germany	(England); Surbiton	(Belgium); Dragons	(Germany); Club an der Alster	(Ukraine); Sumchanka
2025	Rakovník, Czechia	(England); Hampstead & Westminster	(Scotland); Watsonians	(Ireland); Loreto	(France); Cambrai
2026	Vienna, Austria	(England); Hampstead & Westminster	(Ukraine); Sumchanka	(France); Saint Germain	(Austria); Wien
