= Daniel Caine =

Dan or Daniel Caine may refer to:

- A pseudonym of English jazz musician Derek Wadsworth (1939–2008)
- Dan Caine (born 1968), United States Air Force general and Chairman of the Joint Chiefs of Staff

== See also ==
- Daniel Caines (born 1979), English track and field athlete
- Dan Cain, a character in the Re-Animator film series and franchise
- Daniel Cane (active since 1998), American businessman
- Daniel Kane (disambiguation)
