= 2012 Channel O Music Video Awards =

The 9th Annual Channel O Music Video Awards were held at Walter Sisulu Square in Kliptown, Soweto, Johannesburg, South Africa on 17 November 2012. The nominees were unveiled at an announcement party in Johannesburg on 21 September 2012. Kenyan hip hop group Camp Mulla topped the list with four nominations, but failed to bring home an award. Among those who will be performing are Davido, Ice Prince, Khuli Chana, M.anifest, Camp Mulla and Zeus. PRO released his single "Makasana".

== Nominees and winners ==
Winners are in bold text.

=== Video of the Year ===
- DJ Zinhle ft Busiswa – My name Is
- Khuli Chana ft Notshi – Tswa Daar
- Toya Delazy – Pump It On
- / Lizha James ft Pérola – Leva Boy
- Big Nelo – Sente O Beat
- **D’Banj – Oliver Twist**
- Brymo – Ara
- Sarkodie ft. Obrafour – Saa Okodie No
- Camp Mulla – Fresh All Day
- / AY ft Romeo & Lamyia – Speak With Your Body

=== Best Male Video ===
- Khuli Chana ft Notshi – Tswa Daar
- Pro – Makasana
- Big Nelo – Sente O Beat
- **D’Banj – Oliver Twist**
- / AY ft. Romeo & Lamyia – Speak With Your Body

=== Best Female Video ===
- **Zahara – Loliwe**
- / Lizha James ft Perola – Leva Boy
- Tiwa Savage – Love Me, Love Me, Love Me
- Mo’Cheddah ft. Phenom – See Me
- / Keko ft. Madtraxx – Make You Dance

=== Best Newcomer ===
- Toya Delazy – Pump It On
- **Davido – Dami Duro**
- E.L. – Turn The Lights Down
- Camp Mulla ft. Collo – Party Don't Stop
- Donald – I Deserve

=== Best Duo, Group or Featuring ===
- Micasa – Heavenly Sent
- / Liquideep – Still
- / Buffalo Souljah ft. Cabo Snoop – Styra Inonyengesa
- / **P-Square ft. Akon and May D – Chop My Money**
- Camp Mulla – Fresh All Day

=== Best Dance ===
- DJ Zinhle ft. Busiswa – My name Is
- **DJ Cleo – Facebook**
- OS 3 ft. Tcholoby – Mokongo
- Davido – Dami Duro
- Bucie – Get Over It
- CPwaa – Hmmm

=== Best Ragga Dancehall ===
- // HHP ft Lutan Fyah & Omar Retnu – Baheitane (Remix)
- / **Buffalo Souljah ft. Cabo Snoop – Styra Inonyengesa**
- / Ice Prince ft. Gyptian - Magician (Remix)
- Orezi – Booty Bounce
- Wyre – Dancehall Party

=== Best African Pop ===
- Jozi – Ugologo
- DJ Sbu ft. Zahara – Lengoma
- / Gal Level ft. Toniks – Money
- **Brymo – Ara**
- Maurice Kirya – I Don’t Want To Fight

=== Best Southern African ===
- **Cashtime Fam – Shut it down (Stundee)**
- HHP – Bosso
- Shota ft. Shana – Taking You Home
- Zeus – Dancing Shoes
- / Paul G ft. Maezee – The Feeling
- Shugasmakx ft. Moneoa – Take It Easy

=== Best West African ===
- / **D-Black ft. Mo’Cheddah – Falling**
- Wizkid – "Pakurumo"
- Sarkodie ft. Obrafour – Saa Okodie No
- Naeto C – I Gentle
- Wande Coal – Private Trips

=== Best East African ===
- / Keko ft. Madtraxx – Make You Dance
- Camp Mulla ft. Collo - Party Don’t Stop
- / **AY ft Sauti Sol – I Don’t Want To Be Alone**
- / K'naan and Nas – Nothing To Lose
- Navio – One & Only

=== Best Hip Hop ===
- Khuli Chana ft Notshi – Tswa Daar
- L-Tido – Smash
- **Ice Prince – Superstar**
- M.anifest – Makaa Maka
- /K'naan ft. Nas – Nothing To Lose

=== Best R&B ===
- Lloyd Cele – Hero
- / Lizha James ft Perola – Leva Boy
- **Flavour ft. Tiwa Savage – Oyi**
- 2Face – Be There
- Habida ft. Cannibal – My Reason

=== Best Kwaito ===
- Kabelo ft. Professor – Amapantsula’Ajabulile
- Spikiri ft. Various artists – Ngeke Balunge
- Big Nuz – Serious
- / **EES ft. Mandoza – Ayoba**
- / The Dogg ft. Brickz – Tromentos

=== Special Recognition ===
Oskido
