= B flow =

B flow may refer to:

- B-flow mode of medical ultrasonography
- B'Flow, stage name of Brian Mumba Kasoka Bwembya, a dancehall and hip hop artist
