= Hold It Down =

Hold It Down may refer to:

- Hold It Down (song), by Camp Mulla
- Hold It Down (Das EFX album)
- Hold It Down (Madball album)
- "Hold It Down", a storyline in the science fiction comedy webtoon series Live with Yourself!
- "Hold It Down", a 1992 UK Top 40 single by Senseless Things
