= Paul Da Prince =

Zambian born singer

- Born: Paul Munanjala; 8 December 1991 (age 34); Mufulira, Copperbelt Province, Zambia
- Genre: R&B
- Occupations: Singer; TV Presenter; Master of Ceremony
- Years active: 2011–present
- Website: http://www.pauldaprince.com

Paul Munanjala professionally known as Paul Da Prince is a Zambian-born musician, TV and Radio presenter, DJ, Master of Ceremonies based in Windhoek, Namibia. He first rose to fame in 2007 after taking part in a singing competition on Muvi TV's Teen Star program.

== Early and personal life ==
Paul was born on 8 December 1991 in Zambia's Copperbelt town of Mufulira. He grew up in Lusaka and attended primary school at the Gospel Outreach Christian Academy (GOCA) and Mount Jebica primary and secondary school. He has expressed his admiration for singers Usher, NSYNC, Boyz II Men, Omarion, Chris Brown, Ne-Yo and Trey Songz. He joined the Muvi TV team in 2011, learning how to produce and present television content. He studied for a certificate in camera operations at TEVETA in 2010. He also studied a diploma in Hardware and Network Engineering from 2010 to 2011. Paul went on to pursue his media degree at the University of Namibia in 2012, graduating four years later in 2016 with an honors degree in Media and Drama.

== Music career ==
Paul recorded his first single in 2009 titled 'She's my lady' produced by Daxon of Ma Africa. He went on to collaborate with Ruff Kid in 2010 on a song titled 'Boss Lady'. This gained airplay on local radio stations. He went on to record his debut album in Windhoek in 2015, working with Namibian artists, including: Floritha, Bertholdt, KP Illest, Adora, Oteya, K'Chinga (Zambia), T.R.E (UK), Solomon YT (Nigeria) and Anthony Faulkner (USA).

=== Entertainment ===
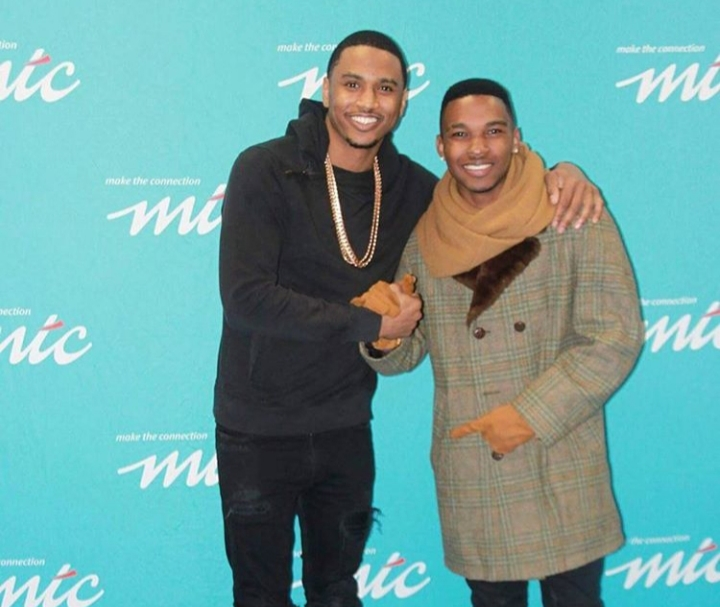
Paul Da Prince and American singer Trey Songz at an event organized by MTC Namibia in 2015

Paul is prominent for his role as a TV presenter and master of ceremonies. Having worked with Muvi TV in his teenage years on shows like Z-Kids News, Michael Jackson Dance Show and the Kids and Teens show between 2008 and 2012. He currently works with the Namibian Broadcasting Corporation as the host of the weekly entertainment show 'Whatagwan' and hosts a breakfast show on NBC's National FM every weekday. He has hosted various high-profile events including the Trey Songz Concert in 2015, the Namibian Annual Music Awards in 2015, 2016, 2017, 2018 and 2019. He guest-hosted SuperSport and Mzanzi Magic's weekly sports and entertainment show which is hosted by Minnie Dlamini and Lungile Radu in September 2018. He also worked on two seasons of 'Kumwesu' which is a lifestyle and entertainment programme which aired on Zambezi Magic between 2017 and 2018.

== Awards and nominations ==
Year	Award	Category	Result
2013	Born & Bred awards	Best R&B	Nominated
2013	Born and Bred Awards	Personality of the Year	Won
2018	Lifestyle & Fashion Awards	Best Upcoming Artist of the Year	Nominated
2019	Simply You Magazine	Favorite TV Personality	Nominated
