= Tendaness =

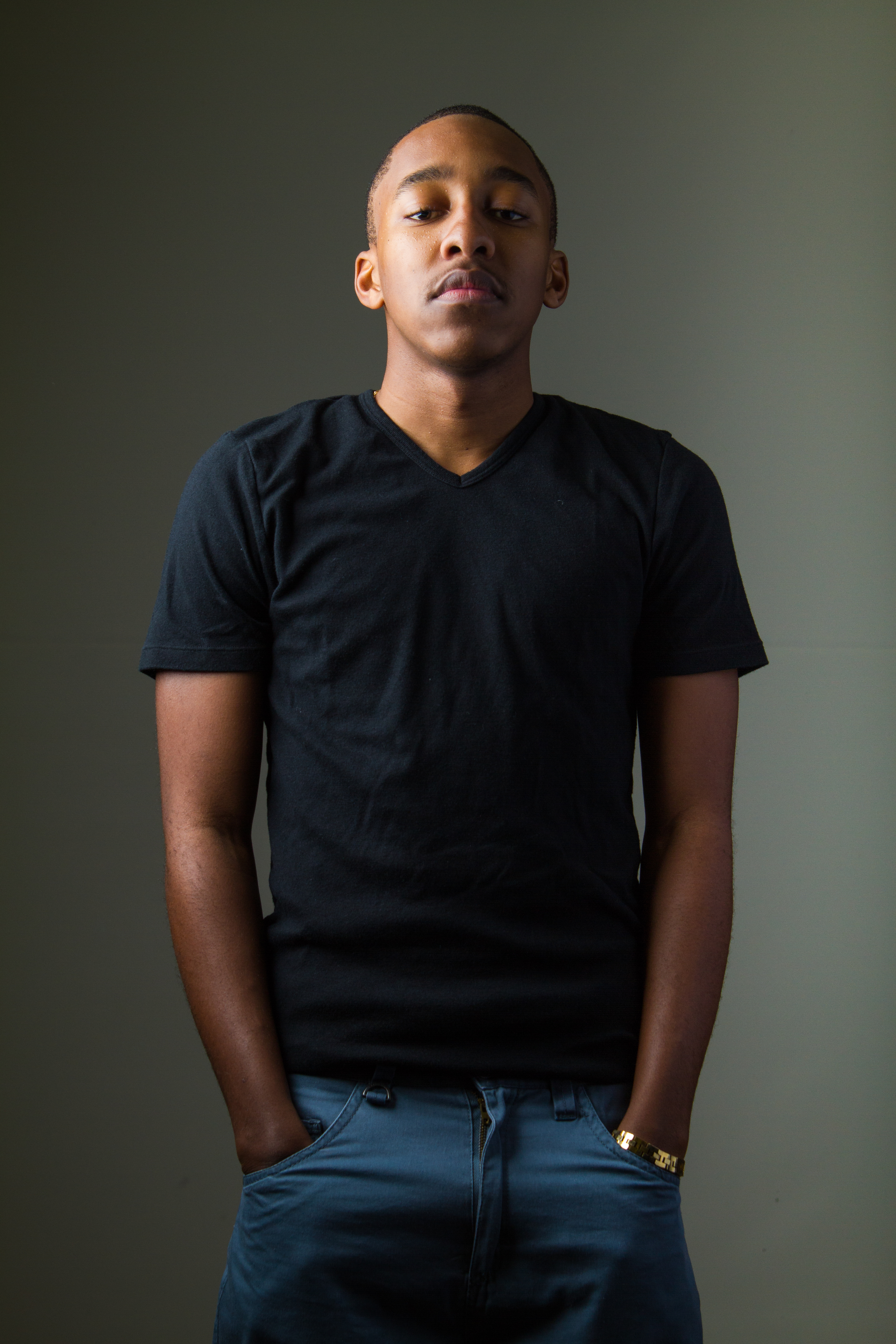
- Tendaness in 2013

Background information
- Also known as: Tendaness
- Born: Tatenda Mandaza; 10 September 1992 (age 33); Mbabane, Eswatini
- Genres: EDM; Hip Hop; Pop Music
- Occupations: DJ; record producer; songwriter
- Instruments: Piano, Guitar, Synthesizer
- Years active: 2008 – present
- Label: Tendamix
- Website: tendaness.com

Tatenda Mandaza (born 10 September 1992), known professionally as Tendaness, is a Swazi-born record producer, DJ and songwriter.

== Early life and career ==
Tatenda Mandaza was born in Mbabane, the capital city of Eswatini. His mother is Swati and his father is Zimbabwean. He began his music career in 2007–2008 in his bedroom after having picked up an interest in the art from a friend in high school. He got his stage name 'Tendaness' from his friend who taught him how to use turntables in 2008. He mastered the process of music production and established his record label, Tendamix Records in 2011. Tendaness has won two national "DJ of the Year" awards in Eswatini (2010–2011 and 2011/2012) and won first place in the Sprite DJ Champion 2011.

In August 2012, Tendaness moved to the United States to attend the University of Oklahoma in Norman, Oklahoma. He studied advertising with a minor in Film and Media Studies for four years while still making music. Tendaness released his first EP Play on 23 August 2012 under UK based indie label Crossborder Records. He has released many more singles, EPs and official remixes to date. He released a major single "Overload" in 2013. The single featured former Cashtime member Smashis (now Zingah) and rapper Kid Nice. The track was released during his time as Coca-Cola Swaziland Ambassador, as part of the Crazy For Good Campaign. The song gained major airplay in Swaziland and South Africa and had the first ever Swazi music video to be aired on major music channels like MTV Base and Channel O. On 3 March 2016, he released his debut LP "Grande" featuring a roster of upcoming artist from Swaziland and around Africa.

== Career ==
On 24 March 2017 he released the debut single from his debut album "Tendanes" titled "Jika ft. Bholoja & LO. The song was play-listed radio by stations in many countries in Africa and beyond. He is signed to his own label Tendamix. Tendamix is Mandaza's own label. Jika reached number 1 on the Apple Music Top 100 Charts for Swaziland, reached Number 1 on the SBIS 2 Top 100 songs of 2017, Number 2 on the Y Urban Top 40 Chart and Number 29 on the #YTop100 songs on 2017 Charts on YFM in South Africa (where the song was placed on heavy rotation), Number 2 on the DJ Edu DNA Top 5 Chart on BBC Radio 1Xtra and number 4 on the Afro Turn Up Charts on PBS 106.7FM in Melbourne, Australia. The music video for "Jika" was later released on 22 June 2018.

== Discography ==
=== LPs ===
Album title	Album details
Grande	Released: 3 March 2016; Label: Tendamix; Formats: Digital download

=== Official Remixes ===
Remix Title	Mixtape Details
Emrah Is – Fuck the Robot (Tendaness Remix)	Released: 25 May 2013; Label: UL Records; Formats: Digital download
Camp Mulla – Party Don't Stop (Tendaness Remix)	Released: N/A; Label: Sub Sahara; Formats: Digital download
Lo & Adrienne Foo – Ride (Tendaness Remix)	Released: 10 February 2015; Album: Art Money; Label: Swazi Jive; Formats: Digital download
Adrienne Foo – Pressure (Tendaness Remix)	Released: 10 February 2015; Album: Art Money; Label: Swazi Jive; Formats: Digital download

=== Extended plays ===
Mixtape Title	Mixtape Details
Fortune – EP	Released: 23 August 2012; Label: UL Records; Formats: Digital download
Play – EP	Released: 1 November 2012; Label: Crossborder Records; Formats: Digital download
Sober Day, Drunk Night – EP	Released: 12 December 2012; Label: VIA Recordings; Formats: Digital download
The Unexpected – EP	Released: 19 February 2013; Label: Fantom Digital; Formats: Digital download

=== Singles ===
Single Title	Single Details	Album
Overload ft. Smashis and Kid Nice	Released: 21 October 2013; Label: Tendamix; Formats: Digital download	Single
Gold Chain ft. Kikwa and Reggie	Released: 2 February 2015; Label: Swazi Jive Records; Formats: Digital download	Single
Drinking & Driving (DUI) ft. LO	Released: 12 March 2015; Label: Swazi Jive Records; Formats: Digital download	Grande
Skeem ft. Donno & Lo	Released: 13 November 2015; Label: Tendamix; Formats: Digital download	Grande
Bad Mami Game ft. Kikwa	Released: 3 March 2016; Label: Tendamix; Formats: Digital download	Grande
JIKA ft. Bholoja & LO	Released: 24 March 2017; Label: Tendamix; Formats: Digital download	Single
Love Me ft. Velemseni & Bholoja	Released: 9 June 2017; Label: Tendamix; Formats: Digital download	Single
Call on Me ft. Nomalungelo	Released: 26 July 2017; Label: Tendamix; Formats: Digital download	Single
Solo ft. Velemseni	Released: 28 September 2017; Label: Tendamix; Formats: Digital download	Single
Tell Me ft. Tiyas King	Released: 30 November 2017; Label: Tendamix; Formats: Digital download	Single
Make Up Your Mind ft. Symphony	Released: 2 February 2018; Label: Tendamix; Formats: Digital download	Single
Mosha ft. Masandi	Released: 24 August 2018; Label: Tendamix; Formats: Digital download	Single

=== Studio albums ===
Album title	Album details
Tendaness	Released: 22 March 2019; Label: Tendamix; Formats: Digital download

== Awards and nominations ==
Year	Award Ceremony	Prize	Work/Recipient	Result
2010	Swaziland National Arts & Culture Awards	DJ of the Year	Himself	Won
2011	Swaziland National Arts & Culture Awards	DJ of the Year	Himself	Won
2011	Sprite DJ Championship	Best DJ	Himself	Won
2017	MTN SWAMA Awards	DJ of the Year	Himself	Nominated
2018	MTN SWAMA Awards	Best Collaboration	Jika ft. Bholoja & LO	Won
2018	MTN SWAMA Awards	Best Music Video	Jika ft. Bholoja & LO	Nominated
2018	MTN SWAMA Awards	Song of the Year	Jika ft. Bholoja & LO	Nominated
