= Funkstown =

Funkstown may refer to a location in the United States:

- Funkstown, Maryland, a small town in Washington County
  - Battle of Funkstown, an American Civil War battle on July 10, 1863
- Foggy Bottom, Washington, D.C., a section of the US capital known colloquially in the 19th century as "Funkstown"

== See also ==
- Funkytown (disambiguation)
