= Shakim Ssembusi =

Ugandan rugby union player

Rugby union career
- Current team: Plascon Mongers

Shakim Ssembusi is a Ugandan rugby union player currently turning out for Plascon Mongers in the Uganda Rudgy Premiership, having previously played for Walukuba Barbarians. He has also been part of Uganda's national rugby sevens setup.

== Rugby career ==
=== Club career ===
Ssembusi played for Barbarians before joining Plascon Mongers ahead of the 2026 Uganda Rugby Premiership campaign. His performances at Mongers made him one of the notable signings of the season for Mongers'.

In May 2026, Daily Monitor Newspaper reported that Ssembusi had scored 103 points in nine league matches, including four tries. He had also converted 28 of 43 kicking attempts. The newspaper described his contribution as important to Mongers' control of matches and management of territory.

=== International career ===
Ssembusi made his debut for Uganda's senior 15-a-side national team, the Rugby Cranes, in 2023.

In October 2025, he was named among the players selected for Uganda's squad for the Safari Sevens tournament in Nairobi. The selection followed his performances in Uganda's domestic rugby sevens competition.

In August 2026, Ssembusi was included in Uganda's travelling squad for the Kenya Driftwood Rugby Sevens tournament in Mombasa. The tournament was part of Uganda's preparations for subsequent international rugby sevens competitions.
