= Just Slim =

- Born: Paul Chilupe Banda; June 17, 1989 (age 37)
- Occupations: Music producer; Singer; Songwriter; Graphic designer; DJ
- Years active: 2007–present
- Children: Gertrude Willa Luyando Banda
- Musical career
- Genres: Hip hop; R&B; Pop; Rap; Reggae; Dancehall
- Instrument: Vocals
- Labels: X.Y.Z Entertainment (2008–2009); Gettu Music Inc. (2009–present)

Paul Chilupe Banda (born June 17, 1989), known professionally as Just Slim, is a Zambian singer, songwriter, rapper, music producer, television presenter, graphic designer and disc jockey. He began his career in 2007 as a songwriter and producer before pursuing a career as a recording artist.

Banda released his debut singles "Me" and "Wachelwa" in December 2010. Both songs were later featured in the MTV documentary Me, Myself & HIV, which followed young Africans living openly with HIV. The documentary brought attention to Banda's music and his work in HIV awareness.

His music career includes the mixtape Proof: The Mixtape (2012), the extended play Chitukuko (2024), and a number of singles released between 2010 and 2026. His music has included elements of hip hop, R&B, Afro-pop, Afrofusion, dancehall and Amapiano. He has collaborated with several Zambian artists, including Slap Dee, B Flow, Cactus Agony, Tio Nason and T Bwoy.

Alongside his music career, Banda has worked in HIV awareness and advocacy. He has been associated with the Brothers for Life campaign and the AIDS Healthcare Foundation, and in 2023 he presented the first two seasons of the television series Yes, I Have HIV Zambia. He was also selected as one of Google's Zeitgeist Young Minds in 2011.

== Early life ==
Paul Chilupe Banda was born on June 17, 1989, in Zambia. He began his early childhood education at Southend Nursery School at about the age of three. He left the school at around the age of five following the death of his father and spent about two years out of school. Banda resumed his education at Thornpak Primary School, where he began Grade 1 in 1996. During his second term in Grade 1, he was advanced to Grade 2. He continued at Thornpak through Grade 6 before sitting for and passing the Grade 7 examination.

In 2001, Banda enrolled at Northmead Basic School, where he completed Grades 8 and 9. He later attended Munali Boys Secondary School, where he completed Grades 10 through 12 between 2003 and 2005. He developed an interest in music at an early age and began writing songs while he was still in school. Alongside music, he developed skills in graphic design and music production, which contributed to his early career in the creative industry.

=== HIV diagnosis and disclosure ===
During his teenage years, Banda was diagnosed with HIV after experiencing recurring tuberculosis. In 2003, he was treated for tuberculosis, which returned the following year. Doctors subsequently recommended that he undergo an HIV test. His mother then disclosed her own HIV-positive status to him, and he agreed to take the test, which confirmed that he had HIV. Banda later chose to disclose his HIV status publicly. He said that he wanted to challenge the stigma and discrimination faced by people living with HIV and encourage others to speak openly about their experiences.

== Music career ==
=== 2007–2012: Early career and Proof: The Mixtape ===
Just Slim with B Flow on stage at the Keep The Promise 2016 Durban, South Africa

Banda began his music career in 2007 as a songwriter and music producer. During his early career, he worked with several Zambian artists, including Slap Dee, JK, Ruff Kid, P Jay and Paul Da' Prince. These collaborations gave him experience as a producer while he developed his own career as a recording artist. Before releasing his own material, he recorded reinterpretations of songs such as Tyrese's "Best of Me" and Kanye West's "Through the Wire".

In December 2010, Banda released his debut singles "Me" and "Wachelwa". Both songs were later featured in the MTV documentary Me, Myself & HIV, which followed young Africans living openly with HIV. The documentary also featured Banda's personal story and advocacy work.

In 2011, Banda was selected as one of Google's Zeitgeist Young Minds, a programme that recognised young Africans for their work in their communities. He later collaborated with Tio Nason and Cactus Agony on a song supporting Zambia's Brothers for Life campaign. The song was produced by Mag44 and promoted HIV awareness, testing and positive living.

In March 2012, Banda released his debut mixtape, Proof: The Mixtape. The project combined original songs with R&B, hip hop and Afro-pop influences and marked his development as a solo recording artist.

=== 2013–2016: Music, collaborations and advocacy ===
During this period, Banda continued to release music and collaborate with other Zambian artists while becoming more involved in HIV advocacy. He became an ambassador for Zambia's Brothers for Life campaign, which promoted HIV testing, treatment and efforts to reduce stigma among men. His advocacy work also brought him into contact with organisations including UNAIDS and ReliefWeb.

In 2015, Banda collaborated with B Flow on the single "Know Your Status", released in partnership with the AIDS Healthcare Foundation (AHF) ahead of World AIDS Day. The song promoted HIV testing and awareness. In July 2016, Banda and B Flow represented Zambia at the Keep the Promise Concert and March in Durban, South Africa. The event was organised by the AIDS Healthcare Foundation ahead of the 21st International AIDS Conference and featured performers including Queen Latifah, Common, Mi Casa and Big Nuz.

Later in 2016, Banda released the single "Stay Positive". The song continued his focus on positive living and themes of hope and perseverance.

=== 2017–2021: Independent releases ===
Following the release of "Stay Positive" in 2016, Banda continued his music career as an independent artist and released a series of singles. During this period, his music incorporated a wider range of contemporary African styles while retaining elements of R&B and Afro-pop. In March 2018, Banda collaborated with Cactus Agony on the dancehall-influenced single "Mi Want Yuh". The song received radio airplay in Zambia and reached the Top 3 of HOT FM 87.7's Top 10 at 10 chart.

Later in 2018, Banda released "Nikukonde", featuring singer MIC. The song was accompanied by his first official music video. He subsequently released "Chumvwika Bwino", which was also accompanied by an official music video and incorporated elements of Afrofusion alongside his earlier R&B and Afro-pop influences. Banda continued working as an independent recording artist during the period while also remaining involved in HIV advocacy and community activities.

=== 2022–present: Chitukuko and later releases ===
In 2022, Banda released "Ku Macha", a collaboration with Kreative Nativez and Mr. COG, who also produced the song. The track incorporates elements of Afrofusion, Amapiano and house music and centres on a man expressing appreciation for his partner and family. It later received airplay on BBC Radio 1Xtra. Banda later collaborated with Zambian musician T Bwoy on the single "Special Somebody", continuing his work with contemporary Afro-pop and Afrofusion.

In February 2024, Banda released the extended play Chitukuko, his first extended project since Proof: The Mixtape in 2012. The EP incorporated Afrofusion, Afro-pop, R&B and Amapiano and included songs dealing with relationships, personal growth, resilience and hope. Following Chitukuko, Banda continued releasing music, including "Keeper", "Wenye", "I See a Chair" and "Unisiye Che".

== Advocacy and media work ==
Banda has been involved in HIV awareness and advocacy alongside his music career. After publicly disclosing that he was living with HIV, he used his public profile to promote HIV testing, treatment and efforts to reduce stigma. His advocacy work became an important part of his public activities.

In 2011, Banda was selected as one of Google's Zeitgeist Young Minds, a programme that recognised young Africans for their work in their communities. He later worked with the Brothers for Life campaign in Zambia, participating in initiatives that encouraged HIV testing, treatment adherence and discussions about HIV and gender-related issues.

Banda also worked with the AIDS Healthcare Foundation (AHF) on HIV awareness initiatives. In 2015, he collaborated with B Flow on "Know Your Status", a song promoting HIV testing ahead of World AIDS Day. In July 2016, the two artists represented Zambia at the Keep the Promise Concert and March in Durban, South Africa, an event organised by AHF ahead of the 21st International AIDS Conference.

In 2023, Banda expanded his work into television when he was contracted by Honey to present the first two seasons of Yes, I Have HIV Zambia. The documentary series followed people living with HIV as they disclosed their status to family members and friends and explored issues including stigma, treatment, relationships and acceptance. Banda has also taken part in youth empowerment programmes, public speaking engagements and community outreach activities related to health awareness and social inclusion.

== Discography ==
=== Mixtapes ===
- Proof: The Mixtape (2012)

=== Extended plays ===
- Chitukuko (2024)

=== Selected singles ===
- "Me" (2010)
- "Wachelwa" (2010)
- "Know Your Status" (featuring B Flow) (2015)
- "Stay Positive" (2016)
- "Mi Want Yuh" (featuring Cactus Agony) (2018)
- "Wechilibe" (2018)
- "Nikukonde" (featuring MIC) (2018)
- "Chumvwika Bwino" (2019)
- "Ku Macha" (featuring Kreative Nativez and Mr. COG) (2022)
- "Special Somebody" (featuring T Bwoy) (2023)
- "Keeper" (2024)
- "Wenye" (2025)
- "I See a Chair" (2026)
- "Unisiye Che" (2026)

== Filmography ==
=== Television ===
Year	Title	Role
2023	Yes, I Have HIV Zambia	Presenter (seasons 1–2)

=== Documentary appearances ===
Year	Title	Role
2010	Me, Myself and HIV (MTV)	Himself

== Awards and recognition ==
Year	Award or recognition	Category or role
2011	Google Zeitgeist Young Minds	Young African making a positive social impact
	Brothers for Life	HIV awareness campaign ambassador
2022	BBC Radio 1Xtra	"Ku Macha" playlist
	Zambia Ministry of Education	Bravery, Courage and Commitment Award
