= Dear Mama (disambiguation) =

"Dear Mama" is a song by 2Pac.

Dear Mama may also refer to:

== Film and TV ==
- Dear Mama, 1984 Philippines film Snooky Serna, Julie Vega, Janice de Belen
- Dear Mama, 2016 VH1 Mothers Day honors event hosted by comedian Anthony Anderson, Mary J. Blige, Alicia Keys
- Dear Mama, 2023 American television documentary series about Tupac Shakur

== Music ==
- "Dear Mama" (B Flow song), a song from the 2016 album of the same name
- "Dear Mama" (Ai song), a song from Ai's 2013 album Moriagaro
