= Funkytown (disambiguation) =

"Funkytown" is a 1979 disco song performed by Lipps Inc. and covered many times.

Funkytown or Funky Town may also refer to:

- Funkytown (film), a Canadian drama film released in 2010 (festival circuit) and 2011 (wide release)
- Funky Town (Camp Mulla album), 2012
- Funky Town (T-Bone Walker album), 1968
- Funky Town, a 2012 repackage of the 2011 EP Black Eyes by T-ara
- "Funky Town" (Amuro Namie song), 2007 song by Japanese R&B singer Amuro Namie
- Funkytown Music, an American record label
- Funkytown HD2, an internet radio station belonging to WEEI-FM in Boston, Massachusetts
- A nickname for Fort Worth, Texas
- A slang term for Memphis
