= Dear Mama (B Flow song) =

Single by B Flow

from the album Dear Mama
- Released: April 7, 2016
- Recorded: 2016
- Genre: Afro-Pop
- Length: 4:48
- Label: Money Music Records
- Songwriter: B Flow
- Producer: KB Killa Beats

"Dear Mama" is a song by Zambian singer and songwriter B Flow and the title track from his fifth studio album Dear Mama (2016). It was written and composed by B Flow with production handled by Killa Beats 'KB'. It was released in March 2016, as the lead single from the album.

"Dear Mama" is a song where B Flow tells a story of the problems faced during his childhood and he cries out why his late mother – the Genesis of his victory story is not here to dine to the success. He also reminisces about the Kabwe days.

== Composition and meaning ==
"Dear Mama" was written and composed by B Flow. It features some parts of the President of the United States Barack Obama's speech during the Young African Leaders Initiative (YALI) in Washington DC where he was also endorsed by the US president.

=== Song meaning ===
The song was sung in Nyanja and English where B Flow cries out why his late mother – the Genesis of his victory story is not here to dine to the success. He also reminisces about the Kabwe days where he moved from selling sweets on the streets of Kabwe to rubbing shoulders with Barack Obama. In his own words from the song, B Flow is "dining with Kings and Queens".

== Track listing ==
Digital download and CD single
No.	Title	Writer(s)	Length
1.	"Dear Mama "	B Flow; Brain	3:30

== Release history ==
Region	Date	Label	Format
Zambia	February 2016	K-Army	Digital download
Zambia	7 April 2016	K-Army	CD
