= Chimwemwe Chihana-Mtawali =

Zambian Photographer

Chimwemwe Chihana, also known by her married name Chimwemwe Chihana Mtawali, is a Zambian photographer known as Qcheda. She is also a Digital Media Specialist, and has written and performed Afro-pop, reggae and dancehall songs under her stage name Wacheda.

== Early and personal life ==
The youngest of five children, Chihana-Mtawali was born on 13 May 1991 to Dudwa Wellington Chihana and Irene Ngwengwe-Chihana in Lusaka, Zambia at the University Teaching Hospital (UTH). Her parents lived in Kabwe but, shortly after her first birthday, Wacheda's father died. She then moved with her mother to Livingstone in Southern Zambia where she lived her formative years.

She is married to entrepreneur Masuzgo William Mtawali. They have a five-year-old daughter.

== Career and education ==
Chihana-Mtawali completed her secondary school education at Hillcrest Technical High School in 2008 where she went to school with fellow songbirds Kantu and Judy Yo and then relocated to Lusaka to study accounting at Zambia Centre for Accountancy Studies. She has worked in the corporate and insurance sector including Multichoice Zambia alongside being assistant director at Graphic404. She graduated with a bachelor's degree in Mass Communication and Public Relations at Cavendish University, Zambia in 2020.

== Music ==
Chihana-Mtawali started singing and songwriting during her school days, and came in to the Zambian spotlight with her song "Iron Man" which features Zambian rapper, Cactus Agony. The video consecutively reached number one on the Zed Top 10 chart on Zambezi Magic DStv for eight weeks. Wacheda went on to win the 2017 CBC TV Viewers Choice Award for RnB video. Shortly after "Iron Man," her single "Maliyo" hit the music scene with a red carpet event video launch at Lusaka's Diamonds Casino. Later in 2017, she released a music video for her single "No More" which features industry DJ Cosmo and Mic Burner. Other figures to make cameo appearances in the "No More" video included DJ Hussein and Hot FM's Lungowe Simbotwe. Wacheda ended 2017 collaborating with Zone Fam's Jay Rox on "Um Yeah" for which she released a lyric video teaser in January 2018.

Other songs released by Wacheda are "Oyu Moye," "Swagger Lover," "Only You" and "Yamu Film".
