= 2010 Safari Sevens =

- Host nation: Kenya
- Date: 4–6 June 2010

Cup
- Champion: Kenya
- Runner-up: Emerging Boks

Plate
- Winner: Ponsonby
- Runner-up: Les Bleus

Bowl
- Winner: Zimbabwe
- Runner-up: Argentina

Shield
- Winner: Hamilton Raiders
- Runner-up: Samurai Sevens

The 2010 Safari Sevens were the 15th annual edition of the Safari Sevens. The event attracted 21,000 spectators and the gate receipts were KSh.17 million/= (compared to KSh.12 million/= from 15,000 spectators in 2009). Georgia, Botswana and Morocco pulled out at the last minute; Rwanda and Shujaa filled the gaps left by these withdrawals.

== Match Officials ==
The 2010 tournament match officials

Name	Home Union	Experience
Stuart Berry	South Africa	Vodacom Cup, Currie Cup and IRB Sevens World Series Referee
Brian Campsall	England	Zurich Premiership, Heineken Cup and Rugby World Cup Referee
Constant Cap	Kenya	Confederation of African Rugby International Referee
Simbarashe Dangah	Kenya	Confederation of African Rugby International Referee
Jason Jaftha	South Africa	Vodacom Cup, Currie Cup and IRB Sevens World Series Referee
John Kagagi	Kenya	Confederation of African Rugby International Referee
Godwin Karuga	Kenya	Confederation of African Rugby International Referee
Rick Kershaw	Zimbabwe	National Referee Assessor and Confederation of African Rugby International Referee
David Rose	England	Zurich Premiership, Heineken Cup and U21 RWC Referee
Koen Daniel-Stephanus	Namibia	Rugby World Cup Qualifiers Referee

== Pool stages ==
=== Pool A ===
Matches

Team 1	Score	Team 2
Les Bleus Sevens	20 - 5	Zambia
Kenya	46 - 0	Samurai International
Les Bleus Sevens	21 - 12	Samurai International
Kenya	29 - 0	Zambia
Zambia	19 - 5	Samurai International
Kenya	29 - 7	Les Bleus Sevens

Final Pool standings

Team	Pld	W	D	L	Pts
Kenya	3	3	0	0	9
Les Bleus Sevens	3	2	0	1	7
Zambia	3	1	0	2	5
Samurai International	3	0	0	3	3

=== Pool B ===
Matches

Team 1	Score	Team 2
Namibia	19 - 26	Bristol Select
Emerging Boks	43 - 5	Tanzania
Bristol Select	54 - 5	Tanzania
Emerging Boks	26 - 7	Namibia
Namibia	42 - 7	Tanzania
Emerging Boks	36 - 7	Bristol Select

Final Pool standings

Team	Pld	W	D	L	Pts
Emerging Boks	3	3	0	0	9
Bristol Select	3	2	0	1	7
Namibia	3	1	0	2	5
Tanzania	3	0	0	3	3

=== Pool C ===
Matches

Team 1	Score	Team 2
Zimbabwe	12 - 14	Shujaa
Argentina	7 - 22	Universitaire de Grenoble
Shujaa	19 - 15	Argentina
Universitaire de Grenoble	12 - 26	Zimbabwe
Zimbabwe	5 - 14	Argentina
Universitaire de Grenoble	10 - 5	Shujaa

Final Pool standings

Team	Pld	W	D	L	Pts
Universitaire de Grenoble	3	2	0	1	7
Shujaa	3	2	0	1	7
Zimbabwe	3	1	0	2	5
Argentina	3	1	0	2	5

=== Pool D ===
Matches

Team 1	Score	Team 2
Uganda	10 - 19	Hamilton Raiders
Ponsonby	31 - 0	Rwanda
Uganda	26 - 0	Rwanda
Ponsonby	24 - 7	Hamilton Raiders
Hamilton Raiders	49 - 5	Rwanda
Ponsonby	24 - 7	Uganda

Final Pool standings

Team	Pld	W	D	L	Pts
Ponsonby	3	3	0	0	9
Uganda	3	2	0	1	7
Hamilton Raiders	3	1	0	2	5
Rwanda	3	0	0	3	3

== Knockout stage ==
=== Cup ===
Quarter-finals
June 6 - Nairobi, Kenya
Shujaa	17
Bristol Select	15
June 6 - Nairobi, Kenya
Kenya	10
Ponsonby	5
June 6 - Nairobi, Kenya
Emerging Boks	28
Les Bleus Sevens	7
June 6 - Nairobi, Kenya
Universitaire de Grenoble	22
Uganda	14

Semi-finals
June 6 - Nairobi, Kenya
Shujaa	0
Kenya	31
June 6 - Nairobi, Kenya
Emerging Boks	22
Universitaire de Grenoble	0

Final
June 6 - Nairobi, Kenya
Kenya	17
Emerging Boks	12

=== Plate ===
Quarter-finals
June 6 - Nairobi, Kenya
Shujaa	17
Bristol Select	15
June 6 - Nairobi, Kenya
Kenya	10
Ponsonby	5
June 6 - Nairobi, Kenya
Emerging Boks	28
Les Bleus Sevens	7
June 6 - Nairobi, Kenya
Universitaire de Grenoble	22
Uganda	14

Semi-finals
June 6 - Nairobi, Kenya
Bristol Select	14
Ponsonby	19
June 6 - Nairobi, Kenya
Les Bleus Sevens	21
Uganda	14

Final
June 6 - Nairobi, Kenya
Ponsonby	26
Les Bleus Sevens	17

=== Bowl ===
Quarter-finals
June 6 - Nairobi, Kenya
Zambia	40
Tanzania	5
June 6 - Nairobi, Kenya
Hamilton Raiders	10
Zimbabwe	19
June 6 - Nairobi, Kenya
Argentina	38
Rwanda	0
June 6 - Nairobi, Kenya
Namibia	21
Samurai International	17

Semi-finals
June 6 - Nairobi, Kenya
Zambia	14
Zimbabwe	29
June 6 - Nairobi, Kenya
Argentina	24
Samurai International	19

Final
June 6 - Nairobi, Kenya
Zimbabwe	7
Argentina	14

=== Shield ===
Quarter-finals
June 6 - Nairobi, Kenya
Zambia	40
Tanzania	5
June 6 - Nairobi, Kenya
Hamilton Raiders	10
Zimbabwe	19
June 6 - Nairobi, Kenya
Argentina	38
Rwanda	0
June 6 - Nairobi, Kenya
Namibia	21
Samurai International	17

Semi-finals
June 6 - Nairobi, Kenya
Tanzania	0
Hamilton Raiders	55
June 6 - Nairobi, Kenya
Rwanda	7
Samurai International	38

Final
June 6 - Nairobi, Kenya
Hamilton Raiders	36
Samurai International	5
