= Hillcrest Technical Secondary School =

Hillcrest National STEM Secondary School
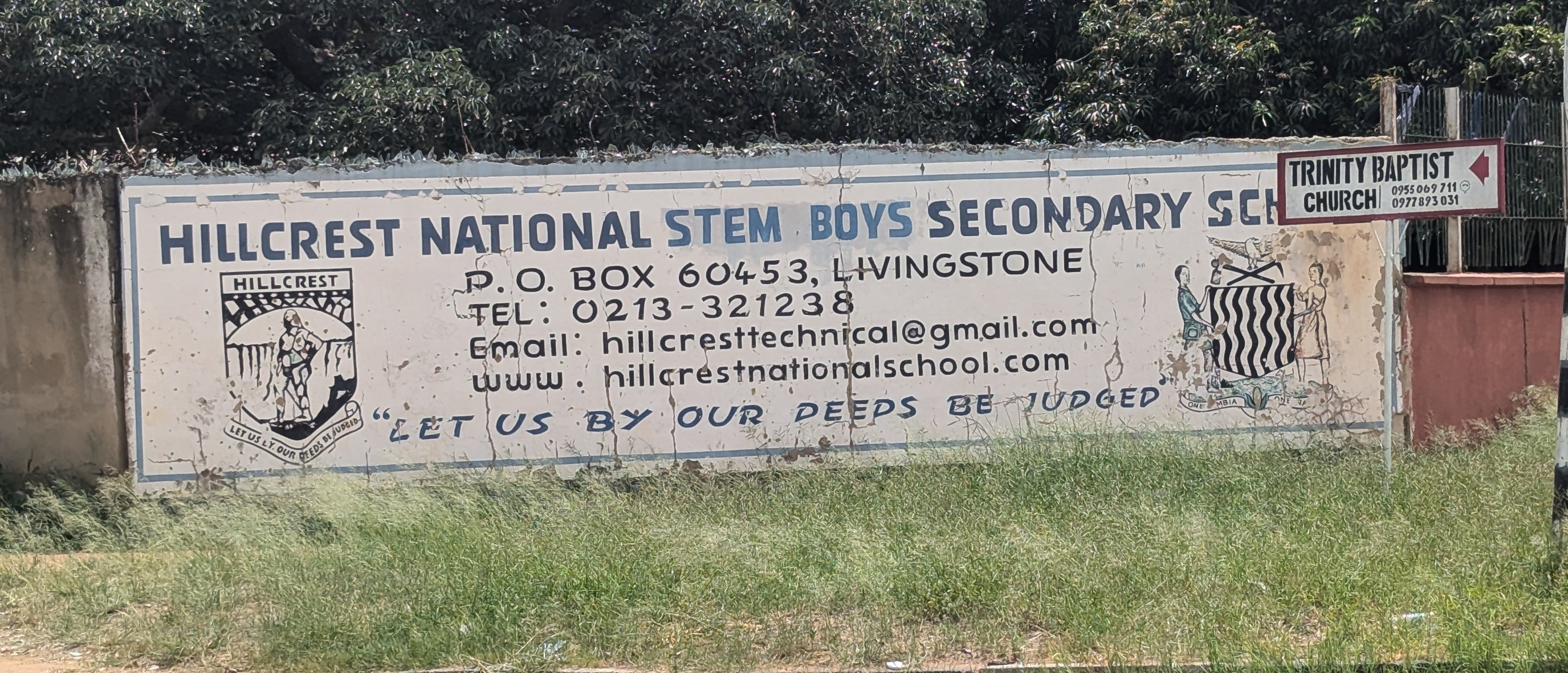
- Front gate in March 2025

Location
- Hillcrest; Livingstone, Southern; Zambia; 17°49′S 25°51′E

Information
- Type: Government
- Motto: Let us by our deeds be judged
- Opened: 1956
- Grades: 8 - 12
- Enrollment: 1500
- Campus: 1
- Colors: Navy blue, grey, white

Hillcrest National STEM Secondary School (formerly known as Hillcrest National Technical Secondary School) is a Government High School running from Grade Eight (8) to Grade Twelve (12). The school is located in Livingstone, Zambia, and was established in 1956. It is one of the biggest schools in the country selecting students from all provinces in Zambia. The school offers both O Level and A Level education and is a boys school, formerly co-education but reverted to single sex in 2021.

== Notable alumni ==
- Chimwemwe Chihana-Mtawali, a singer-songwriter
- Kan 2, a singer-songwriter
- Nevers Mumba, Former Vice President of the Republic of Zambia.
- Situmbeko Musokotwane, Finance Minister, Republic of Zambia
