= 2011 Safari Sevens =

Coordinates: 1°18′15.1″S 36°49′28.1″E

- Host nation: Kenya
- Date: 4–6 November 2011

Cup
- Champion: Samoa
- Runner-up: Samurai Sevens

Plate
- Winner: Auckland Vikings
- Runner-up: Zimbabwe

Bowl
- Winner: Tackling Cancer Tigers
- Runner-up: Bristol University Select

Shield
- Winner: Uganda
- Runner-up: Rwanda

The 2011 Safari Sevens were the 16th annual edition of the Safari Sevens.

== Tournament administration ==
=== Venue ===
After 15 years at the RFUEA Ground and growing attendances annually, the Kenya Rugby Football Union decided to take the tournament to the Nyayo National Stadium for the first time. Nyayo is a football and athletics stadium built in 1983 to host the 1987 All-Africa Games and has a capacity of 30,000; the 2010 African Athletics Championships were also held here. It is the headquarters for the Kenya Football Federation and Athletics Kenya. The rationale for the move was to allow room for more spectators as part of the KRU's bid to have the tournament included in the IRB Sevens World Series by 2015; it was reported that IRB observers were in the country to monitor the event.

There were some worries prior to the event about the move, the area is notorious for robbers who attack motorists and pedestrians and at least one murder has been recorded there two years ago. The Police put in place a security plan including road closures to ensure the tournament passed without incident. Parts of Langata Road and Aerodrome Road were closed to motorists apart from those bearing VIP stickers; parking and shuttle busses were also put in place for the fans between the stadium and Highway Secondary School, All Saints Primary School and Kenya Railways Sports Club. Security fears were vindicated after a woman was raped leaving the tournament. Other commentators have said that the area is no more dangerous than the surroundings of the RFUEA Ground and that the attack was partially a result of bad luck or poor judgement to decide to walk home rather than take a taxi or bus.

=== Dates ===
For the first time the tournament was held in early November, rather than the traditional June, in order to avoid clashes with other world class rugby events so that more prestigious teams could send sides to participate and thus further raise the prominence of the event in the world rugby calendar. The Rugby World Cup 2011 ended in October and the IRB Sevens World Series began two weeks later in late November. The hope is that the Safari Sevens will become a warm-up event to (and possibly even an integral part of) future IRB Sevens World Series.

=== Ticketing ===
Standard tickets cost KSh.300/= (Friday) or KSh.400/= (Saturday and Sunday) per day (KSh.1,000/= for all three days - equal to £6.39 stg., €7,43 or US$10.25). VIP tickets were KSh.1,000/= (Friday) or KSh.2,000/= (Saturday and Sunday) per day, KSh.4,000/= for all three days - equal to £25.58 stg., €29,73 or US$41.00).

=== Match officials ===
A strong panel of match officials blending experienced regulars from previous editions of the Safaricom Sevens with up and coming match officials from the region and overseas referees with international experience. Hong Kong's Lee Wing Yi Gabriel became the first top female referee to officiate at the Safari Sevens (though Kenya's own Sarah Agola, who also officiated, was a veteran of six tournaments having made her officiating debut at the 2005 tournament).

The 2011 tournament match officials

Name	Home Union	Experience

== Men's tournament ==
=== Participating teams ===
Hosts Kenya, Uganda and Bristol University from the United Kingdom are the only sides to have played in this annual event since its inception in 1996.

The teams were as follows.

==== Pool A ====
Team	Notes
Kenya	Tournament hosts and defending champions, have finished in the top ten every season of the IRB Sevens World Series since 2007–2008. Played for the first time under their new coach Mitch Ocholla in this tournament.
Rwanda	
Uganda	Featured at every Safari Sevens since its inception, putting in creditable performances. They have a great rivalry with hosts Kenya in both the sevens and fifteens.
Universitaire de Grenoble	An invitation team made up of players from the Université de Grenoble and FC Grenoble rugby teams. Semi-finalists last year, they lost 0–22 to the Emerging Springboks.

==== Pool B ====
Team	Notes
Auckland Vikings	The representative team of Auckland, the 2011 New Zealand Provincial Sevens champions
Bristol University Select	An invitation team based around Bristol University RFC players but also features others from the Bristol region, including Clifton RFC and the professional outfit Bristol. Have played in every Safari Sevens tournament since 1996.
Emerging Springboks	The Emerging Springboks are a national representative side of players who have never won a full South African cap. They made their debut at the Safari Sevens in 2003 (losing to Kenya in the final). They lost to Kenya again in 2004 before winning in 2006 and 2007 (beating Zimbabwe both times).
Mwamba RFC	Kenya National Sevens Circuit Champions 2011.

==== Pool C ====
Team	Notes
Goshawks	The Under 21 National 7-a-side rugby team of Zimbabwe
Samoa	The 2009–10 IRB Sevens World Series champions included 2010 IRB Sevens World Player of the Year Mikaele Pesamino (fourth in the all-time leading try scorers on the IRB Sevens World Series chart) in their selection.
Spain	Competed in several legs of the 2010–11 IRB Sevens World Series, they entered the Safari Sevens to hone their skills in the short version of the game.
Tackling Cancer Tigers	A team of amateur American rugby sevens all-stars, led by coach James Walker from Belmont Shore (listed as Belmont Shore RFC in some media). A former Kenya Sevens international, Anthony Ongoro, joined them for this, their first trip to Nairobi.

==== Pool D ====
Team	Notes
Royal Welsh Warriors	A team drawn from soldiers of the Second Battalion of the Royal Welsh Regiment, a recently restructured regiment of the British Army
Samurai Sevens	professional invitation side sponsored by Samurai Sportswear, was founded in 1996 by Terry Sands for the 25th Amsterdam Sevens.
Tanzania	
Zimbabwe	Frequent entrants of the competition, they have never won the title but have got to the main cup final on three occasions, 1996, 2006 and 2007.

==== Teams unable to attend ====
Teams slated to attend but later withdrew included:

Team	Notes
British Army rugby sevens team	Replaced by the Royal Welsh Warriors
False Bay RFC	False Bay, South Africa
Les Bleus	Les Bleus Sevens is a non-profit organisation entirely independent of the FFR who also sponsor their own 7-a-side rugby team, Les Bleus, many of whom have gone on to play for the French National sevens side. see their website
Namibia	
Zambia	Cited security issues rather than a lack of funding for their decision to miss the tournament; Kenyan security forces had been engaged for three weeks in a military offensive inside neighboring Somalia after a series of terror attacks on Kenyan tourism targets. Mwamba RFC filled their berth.

=== Pool stages ===
Results form the pool stages.

==== Pool A ====
Matches
Team 1	Score	Team 2
Kenya	26 - 7	Universitaire de Grenoble
Uganda	24 - 0	Rwanda
Rwanda	0 - 36	Kenya
Uganda	5 - 47	Universitaire de Grenoble
Universitaire de Grenoble	45 - 12	Rwanda
Kenya	22 - 7	Uganda

Final Pool standings
Team	Pld	W	D	L	Pts
Kenya	3	3	0	0	9
Universitaire de Grenoble	3	2	0	1	7
Uganda	3	1	0	2	5
Rwanda	3	0	0	3	3

==== Pool B ====
Matches
Team 1	Score	Team 2
Emerging Springboks	28 - 24	Auckland Vikings
Bristol University Select	17 - 21	Mwamba RFC
Mwamba RFC	12 - 19	Emerging Springboks
Bristol University Select	7 - 43	Auckland Vikings
Auckland Vikings	24 - 14	Mwamba RFC
Emerging Springboks	46 - 0	Bristol University Select

Final Pool standings
Team	Pld	W	D	L	Pts
Emerging Springboks	3	3	0	0	9
Auckland Vikings	3	2	0	1	7
Mwamba RFC	3	1	0	2	5
Bristol University Select	3	0	0	3	3

==== Pool C ====
Matches
Team 1	Score	Team 2
Samoa	46 - 0	Tiger Rugby
Spain	29 - 0	Goshawks
Goshawks	0 - 80	Samoa
Spain	33 - 0	Tiger Rugby
Tiger Rugby	40 - 10	Goshawks
Samoa	14 - 14	Spain

Final Pool standings
Team	Pld	W	D	L	Pts
Samoa	3	2	1	0	8
Spain	3	2	1	0	8
Tiger Rugby	3	1	0	2	5
Goshawks	3	0	0	3	3

The first tiebreaker is the head-to-head result between the tied teams, followed by difference in points scored during the tournament. Spain and Samoa tied on points and their head to head result; Samoa won Pool C by virtue of the fact they scored a total of 140 points to Spain's 76.

==== Pool D ====
Matches
Team 1	Score	Team 2
Zimbabwe	38 - 5	Royal Welsh
Samurai Sevens	64 - 0	Tanzania
Tanzania	0 - 51	Zimbabwe
Samurai Sevens	33 - 7	Royal Welsh
Royal Welsh	12 - 0	Tanzania
Zimbabwe	10 - 24	Samurai Sevens

Final Pool standings
Team	Pld	W	D	L	Pts
Samurai Sevens	3	3	0	0	9
Zimbabwe	3	2	0	1	7
Royal Welsh	3	1	0	2	5
Tanzania	3	0	0	3	3

=== Knockout stage ===
Results from the knockout stage.

==== Cup ====
Cup Quarter-finals
Kenya	12
Auckland Vikings	7
Samurai Sevens	17
Spain	0
Samoa	34
Zimbabwe	5
Emerging Springboks	24
Universitaire de Grenoble	14

Cup Semi-finals
Kenya	12
Samurai Sevens	29
Samoa	19
Emerging Springboks	10

Final
Samoa	31
Samurai Sevens	12

==== Plate ====
Plate Semi-final
1	Auckland Vikings	19
4	Spain	14
3	Zimbabwe	19
2	Universitaire de Grenoble	14

Plate Final
Auckland Vikings	29
Zimbabwe	12

==== Bowl ====
Bowl Quarter-finals
Uganda	0
Bristol University Select	19
Royal Welsh	7
Goshawks	5
Tiger Rugby	52
Tanzania	0
Mwamba RFC	19
Rwanda	5

Bowl Semi-finals
Bristol University Select	26
Royal Welsh	7
Tiger Rugby	28
Mwamba RFC	7

Bowl Final
Bristol University Select	14
Tiger Rugby	17

==== Shield ====
Shield Semi-final
1	Tanzania	12
4	Rwanda	28
3	Uganda	21
2	Goshawks	5

Shield Final
Uganda	31
Rwanda	0

== Women's Tournament result ==
=== Round-robin stage ===
Matches
Team 1	Score	Team 2
Uganda 'A'	0 – 24	Kenya
Uganda 'A'	24 – 5	Kenya 'A'
Uganda	29 – 0	Kenya 'A'
Kenya	41 – 5	Kenya 'A'
Uganda	45 – 0	Uganda 'A'
Kenya	10 – 10	Uganda

Final standings
Team	Pld	W	D	L	Pts
Uganda	3	2	1	0	8
Kenya	3	2	1	0	8
Uganda 'A'	3	1	0	2	5
Kenya 'A'	3	0	0	3	3

=== Knockout stage ===
Women's Cup Final
1	Kenya	7
2	Uganda	5

Doreen Remour touched down for Kenya, which was converted by Irene Awino.

== Men's Veteran Results ==
=== Pool stage ===
==== Pool 'A' ====
Matches
Team 1	Score	Team 2
Nondies Vets	5 – 21	Quins Vets
Quins Vets	29 – 0	KCB Vets
Nondies Vets	36 – 0	KCB Vets

Final Pool standings
Team	Pld	W	D	L	Pts
Quins Vets	2	2	0	0	6
Nondies Vets	2	1	0	1	4
KCB Vets	2	0	0	2	2

==== Pool 'B' ====
Matches
Team 1	Score	Team 2
Les Gaulois	5 – 15	Pwani (Coast)
Impala Vets	7 – 10	Pwani (Coast)
Rogue Buffaloes	17 – 0	Les Gaulois
Impala Vets	0 – 12	Rogue Buffaloes
Rogue Buffaloes	12 – 7	Pwani (Coast)
Impala Vets	22 – 5	Les Gaulois

Final Pool standings
Team	Pld	W	D	L	Pts
Rogue Buffaloes	3	3	0	0	9
Pwani (Coast)	3	2	0	1	7
Impala Vets	3	1	0	2	5
Les Gaulois	3	0	0	3	3

=== Knockout stage ===
Veteran's Semi-final
1	Quins Vets	44
4	Pwani (Coast)	0
3	Rogue Buffaloes	0
2	Nondies Vets	15

Veteran's Final
Quins Vets	12
Nondies Vets	0

== Boys ==
Provinces of Kenya: 1. Central; 2. Coast; 3. Eastern; 4. Nairobi / 5. North Eastern; 6. Nyanza; 7. Rift Valley; 8. Western

=== Pools ===
==== Pool 'A' ====
Tanzania made history by putting together a national representative under-19 side for the event. Zimbabwe also sent a national representative side as they have done to several previous Safari Sevens tournaments. Uganda sent their school national champions Hana Mixed School.

All eight of the Kenya provinces were represented in the tournament.

Matches
Team 1	Score	Team 2
Tanzania	12 – 24	Rift Valley
Nyanza	12 – 14	Central
Rift Valley	7 – 17	Nairobi
Tanzania	7 – 34	Nyanza
Nairobi	5 – 5	Central
Rift Valley	0 – 36	Nyanza
Nyanza	17 – 0	Nairobi
Central	10 – 12	Tanzania
Central	14 – 15	Rift Valley
Nairobi	46 – 0	Tanzania

Final Pool standings
Team	Pld	W	D	L	Pts
Nyanza	4	3	0	1	10
Nairobi	4	2	1	1	9
Rift Valley	4	2	0	2	8
Central	4	1	1	2	7
Tanzania	4	1	0	3	6

==== Pool 'B' ====
Matches
Team 1	Score	Team 2
Western	41 – 0	Coast
Hana Mixed (Uganda)	31 – 0	Eastern
Coast	7 – 31	Zimbabwe
Western	12 – 14	Hana Mixed (Uganda)
Zimbabwe	22 – 0	Eastern
Coast	0 – 46	Hana Mixed (Uganda)
Hana Mixed (Uganda)	21 – 7	Zimbabwe
Eastern	0 – 46	Western
Eastern	27 – 10	Coast
Zimbabwe	0 – 36	Western

Final Pool standings
Team	Pld	W	D	L	Pts
Hana Mixed School (Uganda)	4	4	0	0	12
Western	4	3	0	1	10
Zimbabwe	4	2	0	2	8
Eastern	4	1	0	3	6
Coast	4	0	0	4	4

=== Knockout stage ===
==== Boy's Cup ====
Boy's Semi-final
1	Nyanza	0
4	Western	22
3	Hana Mixed School (Uganda)	20
2	Nairobi	0

Boy's Final
Western	15
Hana Mixed School (Uganda)	19

==== Boy's Plate ====
Boy's Plate-final
1	Nyanza	19
2	Nairobi	14

==== Boy's Bowl ====
Boy's Bowl-final
1	Rift Valley	10
2	Zimbabwe	15

==== Boy's Shield ====
Boy's Shield-final
1	Eastern	5
2	Central	25

== Girls ==
=== Group stage ===
==== Pool 'A' ====
Matches
Team 1	Score	Team 2
Mukumu	–	Comras
J.M.Kariuki	–	St. Martin
J.M.Kariuki	–	Comras
Mukumu	–	J.M Kariuki
Comras	–	St. Martin
Mukumu	–	St. Martin

Final Pool standings
Team	Pld	W	D	L	Pts
Team A	3	3	0	0	9
Team B	3	2	0	1	7
Team C	3	1	0	2	5
Team D	3	0	0	3	3

==== Pool 'B' ====
Matches
Team 1	Score	Team 2
Butere	–	Hidden Talent
Hopewell	–	Mercy Care
Butere	–	Mercy Care
Hopewell	–	Hidden Talent
Butere	–	Hopewell
Hidden Talent	–	Mercy Care

Final Pool standings
Team	Pld	W	D	L	Pts
Team A	3	3	0	0	9
Team B	3	2	0	1	7
Team C	3	1	0	2	5
Team D	3	0	0	3	3

=== Knockout stage ===
==== Girl's Cup ====
Girl's Semi-final
1
4
3
2

Girl's Final
Butere
Mukumu

==== Girl's Plate ====
Girl's Plate-final
1
2

==== Girl's Bowl ====
Girl's Bowl-final
1
2

==== Girl's Shield ====
Girl's Shield-final
1
2
