= 2013 Safari Sevens =

Coordinates: 1°18′15.1″S 36°49′28.1″E

- Host nation: Kenya
- Date: November 2013

The 2013 Safari Sevens are the 18th annual edition of the Safari Sevens.

== Tournament administration ==
=== Match officials ===
The 2013 tournament match officials

Name	Home Union	Experience

== Men's tournament ==
=== Participating teams ===
==== Pool A ====
Team	Notes
Kenya	Tournament hosts
Example non national team	

==== Pool B ====
Team	Notes

==== Pool C ====
Team	Notes

==== Pool D ====
Team	Notes

==== Teams unable to attend ====
Teams slated to attend but later withdrew included:

Team	Notes

=== Pool stages ===
Results form the pool stages.

==== Pool A ====
Matches

Team 1	Score	Team 2
Kenya	0 - 0	Opponent
Other opponent	0 - 0	Rwanda
	-	
	-	
	-	
	-	

Final Pool standings

Team	Pld	W	D	L	Pts
Kenya	3	3	0	0	9
Example non national team	3	2	0	1	7
	3	1	0	2	5
	3	0	0	3	3

==== Pool B ====
Matches

Team 1	Score	Team 2
	-	
	-	
	-	
	-	
	-	
	-	

Final Pool standings

Team	Pld	W	D	L	Pts
	0	0	0	0	0
	0	0	0	0	0
	0	0	0	0	0
	0	0	0	0	0

==== Pool C ====
Matches

Team 1	Score	Team 2
	-	
	-	
	-	
	-	
	-	
	-	

Final Pool standings

Team	Pld	W	D	L	Pts
	0	0	0	0	0
	0	0	0	0	0
	0	0	0	0	0
	0	0	0	0	0

==== Pool D ====
Matches

Team 1	Score	Team 2
	-	
	-	
	-	
	-	
	-	
	-	

Final Pool standings

Team	Pld	W	D	L	Pts
	0	0	0	0	0
	0	0	0	0	0
	0	0	0	0	0
	0	0	0	0	0

=== Knockout stage ===
Results from the knockout stage.

==== Cup ====
Cup Quarter-finals
Kenya	5
Example non national team	0

Cup Semi-finals

Final

==== Plate ====
Plate Semi-final
1
4
3
2

Plate Final

==== Bowl ====
Bowl Quarter-finals

Bowl Semi-finals

Bowl Final

==== Shield ====
Shield Semi-final
1
4
3
2

Shield Final

== Women's Tournament result ==
=== Round-robin stage ===
Matches

Team 1	Score	Team 2
Uganda ‘A’	0 – 5	Kenya
	–	
	–	
	–	
	–	
	–	

Final standings

Team	Pld	W	D	L	Pts
	0	0	0	0	0
	0	0	0	0	0
	0	0	0	0	0
	0	0	0	0	0

=== Knockout stage ===
Women's Cup Final
1
2

== Men's Veteran Results ==
=== Pool stage ===
==== Pool 'A' ====
Matches

Team 1	Score	Team 2
	–	
	–	
	–	

Final Pool standings

Team	Pld	W	D	L	Pts
	0	0	0	0	0
	0	0	0	0	0
	0	0	0	0	0

==== Pool 'B' ====
Matches

Team 1	Score	Team 2
	–	
	–	
	–	
	–	
	–	
	–	

Final Pool standings

Team	Pld	W	D	L	Pts
	0	0	0	0	0
	0	0	0	0	0
	0	0	0	0	0
	0	0	0	0	0
	0	0	0	0	0

=== Knockout stage ===
Veteran's Semi-final
1
4
3
2

Veteran's Final

== Boys ==
Provinces of Kenya: 1. Central; 2. Coast; 3. Eastern; 4. Nairobi / 5. North Eastern; 6. Nyanza; 7. Rift Valley; 8. Western

=== Pools ===
==== Pool 'A' ====
Matches

Team 1	Score	Team 2
	–	
	–	
	–	
	–	
	–	
	–	
	–	
	–	
	–	
	–	

Final Pool standings

Team	Pld	W	D	L	Pts
	0	0	0	0	0
	0	0	0	0	0
	0	0	0	0	0
	0	0	0	0	0
	0	0	0	0	0

==== Pool 'B' ====
Matches

Team 1	Score	Team 2
	–	
	–	
	–	
	–	
	–	
	–	
	–	
	–	
	–	
	–	

Final Pool standings

Team	Pld	W	D	L	Pts
	0	0	0	0	0
	0	0	0	0	0
	0	0	0	0	0
	0	0	0	0	0
	0	0	0	0	0

=== Knockout stage ===
==== Boy's Cup ====
Boy's Semi-final
1
4
3
2

Boy's Final

==== Boy's Plate ====
Boy's Plate-final
1
2

==== Boy's Bowl ====
Boy's Bowl-final
1
2

==== Boy's Shield ====
Boy's Shield-final
1
2

== Girls ==
=== Group stage ===
==== Pool 'A' ====
Matches

Team 1	Score	Team 2
	–	
	–	
	–	
	–	
	–	
	–	

Final Pool standings

Team	Pld	W	D	L	Pts
	0	0	0	0	0
	0	0	0	0	0
	0	0	0	0	0
	0	0	0	0	0

==== Pool 'B' ====
Matches

Team 1	Score	Team 2
	–	
	–	
	–	
	–	
	–	
	–	

Final Pool standings

Team	Pld	W	D	L	Pts
	0	0	0	0	0
	0	0	0	0	0
	0	0	0	0	0
	0	0	0	0	0

=== Knockout stage ===
==== Girl's Cup ====
Girl's Semi-final
1
4
3
2

Girl's Final

==== Girl's Plate ====
Girl's Plate-final
1
2

==== Girl's Bowl ====
Girl's Bowl-final
1
2

==== Girl's Shield ====
Girl's Shield-final
1
2
