= Funky Town (Camp Mulla album) =

FuNKYToWN

Studio album by Camp Mulla
- Released: September 29, 2012
- Recorded: 2010−2012
- Genre: Alternative hip hop, R&B
- Length: 57:42
- Label: Sub Sahara
- Producer: K'Cous (exec.), Zannaziki, The Spinners, Just a Band, J. Smilez

Singles from Funkytown
- 1. "Party Don't Stop" Released: August 31, 2010; 2. "Feel No Pain" Released: October 22, 2011; 3. "Fresh All Day" Released: December 26, 2011; 4. "Hold It Down" Released: April 17, 2012

Funky Town (stylized FuNKYToWN) is the debut studio album by Kenyan alternative hip hop group Camp Mulla. It was released on September 29, 2012. News of the album first came out on the group's WordPress blog on 17 April 2012, the same day the music video for "Hold It Down", the first single from the album, was released on YouTube.

The album gained wide publicity when Camp Mulla performed at the opening of the 2012 Safari Sevens on September 22, 2012 to promote it. It was believed that the group had officially released their album during the performance.

== Track listing ==
No.	Title	Writer(s)	Producer(s)	Length
1.	"Funkytown"	Matthew Wakhungu, Benoit Kanema, Marcus Kibukosya	K'Cous	3:33
2.	"Papeyo (Don't Ever Give Up)"	Wakhungu, Kanema, Kibukosya, Suzanne Gachukia	K'Cous, Zannaziki	3:22
3.	"Feel No Pain"	Wakhungu, Kanema, Kibukosya, Karungari Mungai	K'Cous	4:37
4.	"Fresh All Day"	Wakhungu, Kanema, Kibukosya, Mungai	K'Cous	4:21
5.	"Party Don't Stop" (featuring Collo)	Wakhungu, Kanema, Kibukosya, Mungai, Collins Majale	K'Cous	4:08
6.	"Sunday Swagg"	Wakhungu, Kanema, Kibukosya, Mungai	K'Cous, The Spinners	3:40
7.	"Where Do You Come From" (featuring Just a Band)	Wakhungu, Kanema, Kibukosya, Mungai	K'Cous, Just a Band	4:04
8.	"End of the Night (Party Don't Stop, Part II)"	Wakhungu, Kanema, Kibukosya, Mungai	K'Cous	3:05
9.	"Addicted"	Wakhungu, Kanema, Kibukosya, Mungai	K'Cous	3:45
10.	"Take It to the Floor"	Wakhungu, Kanema, Kibukosya, Mungai	K'Cous	3:51
11.	"Low" (featuring J. Smilez)	Wakhungu, Kanema, Kibukosya, Mungai	K'Cous, J. Smilez	3:33
12.	"Hold It Down"	Wakhungu, Kanema, Kibukosya, Mungai	K'Cous	3:44
13.	"We Can Go" (featuring J. Smilez)	Wakhungu, Kanema, Kibukosya, Mungai	K'Cous, J. Smilez	3:26
14.	"Move On" (featuring Bamboo)	Wakhungu, Kanema, Kibukosya, Mungai, Simon Kimani	K'Cous	4:25
15.	"Prices" (featuring Wizkid)	Wakhungu, Kanema, Kibukosya, Mungai	K'Cous	4:01
Total length:				57:42
