= Kantu (singer) =

- Born: Kantu Habanji Siachingili; 5 April 1990 (age 36); Lusaka
- Other names: Kan 2; Kantu
- Occupations: singer; songwriter
- Years active: 2013–present
- Spouse: Micheal Phiri (m. 2020)
- Musical career
- Genres: Hip hop; Afro-pop; R&B
- Instrument: Vocals
- Label: X.Y.Z Entertainment (2013–2016)

Kantu Habanji Siachingili (born 5 April 1990), known professionally as Kantu, which is also written as Kan 2, is a Zambian singer and songwriter, and an ambassador to the Triple V Campaign. She first came onto the Zambian music scene when she featured on Slapdee's track titled "Remember". Her first single "Mungeli" was released in May 2014.

She was nominated twice at the 2015 Mosi Zambia Music Awards event, for Best Collaboration and Best New Artist and won the Best Female Artist award 2016 at the Zambian Music Awards.

== Life and career ==
=== Early life ===
Kantu Habanji Siachingili was born in Choma and is the fifth born daughter in a family of six. Kan 2 did her primary education at Adastra Primary School in Choma and secondary education at Hillcrest Technical High School in Livingstone where she studied with fellow singers Judy Yo and Wacheda.

She did her tertiary education at the University of Zambia in 2009 where she studied for 4 years and has a bachelor's degree in art with Education, Geography major and history minor.

=== 2010–2012: Career beginnings ===
Kan 2 was inspired by her family to do music and also in her own words she is also inspired by the American singer Brandy. In 2010 Kan 2 entered into a competition called In Tha Hood and she won the competition.

In 2012, she again entered into another competition called Talent Yapa Zed. She made it to the top 10 but did not win.

=== 2013–present career ===
In 2013, she worked on a project for the Zambia National Arts Council called 'past to present'. In December 2013, she signed with the record label X.Y.Z Entertainment. Her first single is titled Mungeli was released in February 2014

On 19 April 2016 Kan 2 resigned from X.Y.Z Entertainment and no longer part of the label. She announced this on 30 April 2016 on her Facebook page.

== Music and election ==
=== Triple V campaign ===
Triple V, which stands for My Vote, My Voice, My Victory, was a voter education project which motivated young and newly registered voters to go out and vote in August 2016. Triple V reached out to young voters through music and social media.

The project worked with Kan 2, B Flow and Dj 800 in undertaking roadshows. During the roadshows, the artists sensitised young people on the importance of participating in elections.

== Personal life ==
Kantu is married to Micheal Phiri a lecturer at UNZA.

== Awards and nominations ==
- 2015 Best traditional Album – Zambian Music Awards.
- 2015 nominated Best Upcoming Artist – Zambian music Awards
- 2015 nominated Best Collaboration – Zambian music Awards
- 2015 nominated Best Upcoming Female – Born n Bred awards
- 2016 won Best Female Artist – Zambian music Awards

== Discography ==
=== Selected songs ===
- Alangizi
- Koneki
- Undecided
- Lonely
- Million
