= Karun (musician) =

Kenyan musician

- Born: Karungari Mungai; July 7, 1994
- Other names: Miss Karun, Lady Karun
- Education: Berklee College of Music
- Years active: 2012–Current
- Known for: Singer, Songwriter, Music Producer
- Children: Prince Mwango Mungai-Kiwango
- Website: https://www.karunmusic.com/

Karungari Mungai (born 7 July 1994), professionally known as Karun, is a Kenyan-based singer, songwriter and producer. Karun debuted in the music industry as a teenager as part of BET-nominated group Camp Mulla. Following the group's split in 2012, Karun returned to the Kenyan music industry after her studies and released a series of singles in 2019 one of which was launched as part of Mr Eazi's Empawa Arica Music Program. She has released several EP albums, singles and collaborations since.

== Early life ==
From the age of six, Karun talked about being a singer and was supported by her family from early on. She drew inspiration Alicia Keys, India Arie, Amel Larriuex. She first entered a studio at the age of 13 and upon hearing her voice on the hook of a song, decided that she would pursue music. She attended the Berklee College of music.

== Music career ==
=== Camp Mulla music: 2011-2012 ===
Camp Mulla, a Kenyan alternative hip-hop group, was Karun's entry to Kenya's and Africa's music scene. The group consisted of Five members, Taio Tripper (Rapper), Shappa Man (Rapper), Karun (Lead singer ), K’Cous (producer) and Mykie Toni. The group initially consisted of Mykie Toni, Shappa man and Taio Tripper, before Miss Karun and K'Cous joined them. Initially, their music was shared within high school circles and the group remained underground until they released their first single, Low, in 2010. While their first single was not well received, their next single, Party Don't Stop, would gain them recognition in Kenya and Africa. In 2012, the group was nominated for the 2012 Black Entertainment Television (BET) Awards for Best International Act – Africa. They released their debut album, Funky Town in 2012. In 2013, miss Karun's and Taio's exited the group to pursue higher education

Throughout Camp Mulla's run, Karun stood out as a vocalist. The Native Magazine, wrote "something about these five, especially their charismatic female vocalist Karun that resonates with young Africans". The article analyses the group's track, Price, featuring Wizkid, writing 'The first thing that stands out about ''Prices” is Karun. A singer with enough charm to sway an entire continent, Karun was often the glue that held Camp Mulla's often experimental songs together, and the honey that lured in listeners and kept them through the varying styles of the group's rappers".

=== Solo music career: 2013 ===
When Camp Mulla broke up, Karun had already started working on a solo project. In this period, Karun went by the name Lady Karun. Karun left Kenya to pursue music school, but also at the same time to experiment with her sound, away from the Kenyan media. Before leaving, Karun released her debut solo album 'Sun & Moon', which contained 14 tracks. The album depicted dualism, with the sun representing her calm side and the moon representing her wild side. The album also had two sounds, with the 'sun' using R&B sounds and the 'moon' using afro soul sounds. She also released the 'Lady Bug Project' on her YouTube channel. These web series showcased her preparation for the launch of the album. The album's Interlude (Sun), would later be synced on The Resident, a show on Fox TV.

=== Cosmic Homies: 2016 ===
Karun would eventually become part of another group, Cosmic Homies, an East African experimental music collective, that consisted of four members; Runkah (Karun's moniker while in the group), TAIO (former Camp Mulla member), Marushka and Joseph Kiwango. The group, which aimed to challenge traditional and current stereotypes in the music industry, described their sound as electro-organic. Following Camp Mulla's split, TAIO, built an independent studio at his home where he hosted sessions. It is in these sessions that the four members would meet and decide to form the group. The group's music was influenced by different musical styles including hip-hop, funk, afro punk and rap. They remained an underground music group in Nairobi and performed in the 2016 SXSW in Austin, Texas. The group dropped their album O.N.E. While still a member of the group, Karun dropped a solo 7-track EP, Indigo.

Snapshot from Karun's "Hit Me Up" visualiser.

=== Solo career: 2018- present ===
In 2018, Karun released a single, 'Make Believe’ featuring BIinky Bill. In the same year, she also released another single ‘Roses’ featuring Ukweli. In 2019, Karun became part of the empawa Africa programme, ran by Mr Eazi. Under the programme, she released a single, Glow Up, a blend of afro-beats and alternative R&B. The song explores self-love and female friendships. In the same year, she was inducted Africa Forbes 30 under 30. In 2020, she released 'True to me', a single in collaboration with Sky Girls Kenya In 2021, Karun released a 7-track solo EP, 'Catch A Vibe', which explores themes of self-discovery and gratitude. The EP used afrobeats inspired sounds which was an intentional move. Karun speaking to Tangaza magazine stated "I also knew that I wanted to position this EP, not just in Kenya, not just with the people who already know me. I wanted it to be a sound that can travel. I feel like people everywhere, North America, South America, South Africa, West Africa can connect with this sound". That's where I was going with that". In 2022, she released the single 'Pen & Paper', where she expresses her feelings for a lover. Camille Storm in an article on Okayafrica wrote "The simple production gives room for her trademark vocals to shine on this laidback track". In the same year, she also released 'Lie to Me (Tell me a fairytale)', a mid tempo song that explores romantic love. She also released a 7-track collaborative album, Passenger 555, with producer Jinku. The album which focused on storytelling, fused R&B and downtempo Afro-house sounds. In 2023, Karun performed a new single, Only You, at the Colors Show. The song explores the emotions and experiences of a past relationship In the same year, she won the Amplify You metaverse competition and performed at the metaverse concert.

== Artistry ==
=== Musical style ===
Karun's musical style is described as alternative R&B. She describes her artistry as honest, meditative and uplifting

=== Influences ===
Karun draws influences from Flying Lotus, Erykah Badu. Lokua Kanza, SZA, Kelela and Bonobo which contributes to a sultry sound.

== Discography ==
=== Albums ===
- Sun & Moon

=== EPs ===
- Indigo
- Catch a Vibe
- Passenger 555
- À nu
- Eternal

=== Singles ===
==== 2018 ====
- Make Believe (featuring Blinky Bill)

==== 2019 ====
- Glow up
- Roses
- Roses remix (featuring Tellaman)
- Hit me up

==== 2020 ====
- That Nana
- True to Me (SKY Girls anthem)
- What's the Harm
- Catch A Vibe

==== 2021 ====
- I Know

==== 2022 ====
- Dream Lullaby (Wakarirü)
- Pen & Paper
- Lie to Me (Tell Me a Fairytale) (featuring Blocka)
- Clout Chaser

==== 2023 ====
- Lie To Me (remix pack) - Vol 1, Vol 2
- Who I Am
- Only You - A COLORS SHOW

==== 2024 ====
- Reason
- Let Me
- How Far

==== 2026 ====
- Feel You

== Personal life ==
Karun has a son named Prince.
