= Safari Sevens =

Annual rugby sevens tournament

Coordinates: 1.301499°S 36.771684°E

- Current season, competition or edition: 2019 Safari Sevens
- Safari Sevens
- Sport: Rugby Sevens
- Founded: 1996
- First season: 1996
- Motto: Africa's Premier Rugby Sevens Tournament
- Country: Kenya
- Venues: RFUEA Ground, Nairobi, Kenya
- Most recent champion: Kenya
- Most titles: Kenya (9)
- Qualification: By application and invitation.
- Website: Official website

The Safari Sevens is an annual rugby sevens tournament held in Nairobi, Kenya. The Safari Sevens is open to international representative sides, professional and amateur clubs, invitational teams, university and school teams.

Initially held at the RFUEA Ground, home of the Kenya Rugby Union, the tournament was moved to the Nyayo National Stadium in 2010 and 2011 and then held in the 60,000 seat Moi International Sports Centre from 2012 through 2017. Due to declining spectators and sponsor interest, the event was moved back to the RFUEA in 2018.

== History ==
Since the earliest days, rugby in Kenya had relied on a regular influx of foreign touring sides in order to test the mettle of the local teams and to provide opposition for the representative sides such as the Scorpions RFC and East Africa. The coming of professionalism to rugby in the 1990s all but dried up these tours and it was decided that a means had to be found of re-initiating the influx if the quality of rugby in the country was not to stagnate.

The Rugby Patrons Society decided to put in place a seven-a-side tournament and invite a number of foreign national and club teams to participate. Robin Cahill (a founder member of the society and the man whose brainchild the tournament is) led a team of Patrons to run all the early competitions and oversee its integration into the Kenya Rugby Union's calendar. The trophy, a bronze of two elephants, is named in his memory.

=== The Inaugural Tournament 1996 ===
The inaugural tournament took place in 1996, Public School Wanderers, who had supported Kenyan rugby for a number of years, brought a strong squad as did the Welsh Exiles (a team managed by the Welsh Rugby Union to nurture Wales qualified players living outside of the Principality) captained by future Welsh International captain, Colin Charvis. The tournament also included several international teams (Arabian Gulf, Kenya, Uganda and Zimbabwe) as well as Selkirk RFC and a Cumbria Schoolboys team. The chairman of the referees was the famous English referee Ed Morrison and he took charge of the final between the Public School Wanderers and Zimbabwe. Chester Williams was there as guest of honor and to present the trophies to the winners which included Kenya (who beat Uganda 38-12 in the Plate final) and Cumbria Schoolboys who defeated Shujaa 29-10 in the Bowl Final.

=== Expansion and Growth 1997-2007 ===
In 1999 the then Kenya Rugby Football Union, now the Kenya Rugby Union, applied and won the right to host the Africa Zone Qualifying Tournament for the 2001 Rugby World Cup Sevens Finals. This qualification competition was combined with the 2000 tournament to make it into a longer 3 day festival of rugby rather than cancel the Safari Sevens. The Kenya sevens side did not therefore take part in the Safari Sevens; Shujaa the Kenya 'A' side carried the hopes of the home crowd and did not disappoint, winning the cup. In the World Cup Qualifying tournament Kenya, captained by Sammy Khakame, defeated Swaziland and then Madagascar at the beginning of day two and then Namibia in the semi-finals on day three, thus qualifying to go to Argentina the next year as there were two slots open to the African Zone. Zimbabwe defeated Kenya in the final.

The tournament would grow in stature with a large increase in crowds numbers. In 2004 the first women's team played in the tournament.

In 2005 Fijian rugby great, Waisale Serevi played for Kenya A (Shujaa) as a guest player.

Since then the tournament attracted the likes of London Irish, Emerging Springboks, Fiji, Japan, Western Province, Argentina, Golden Lions, Belgium Barbarians.

The tournament has attracted a variety of international rugby players and coaches including Naas Botha in 1999, Waisale Serevi and Gordon Tietjens.

=== Consolidation 2008-2009 ===
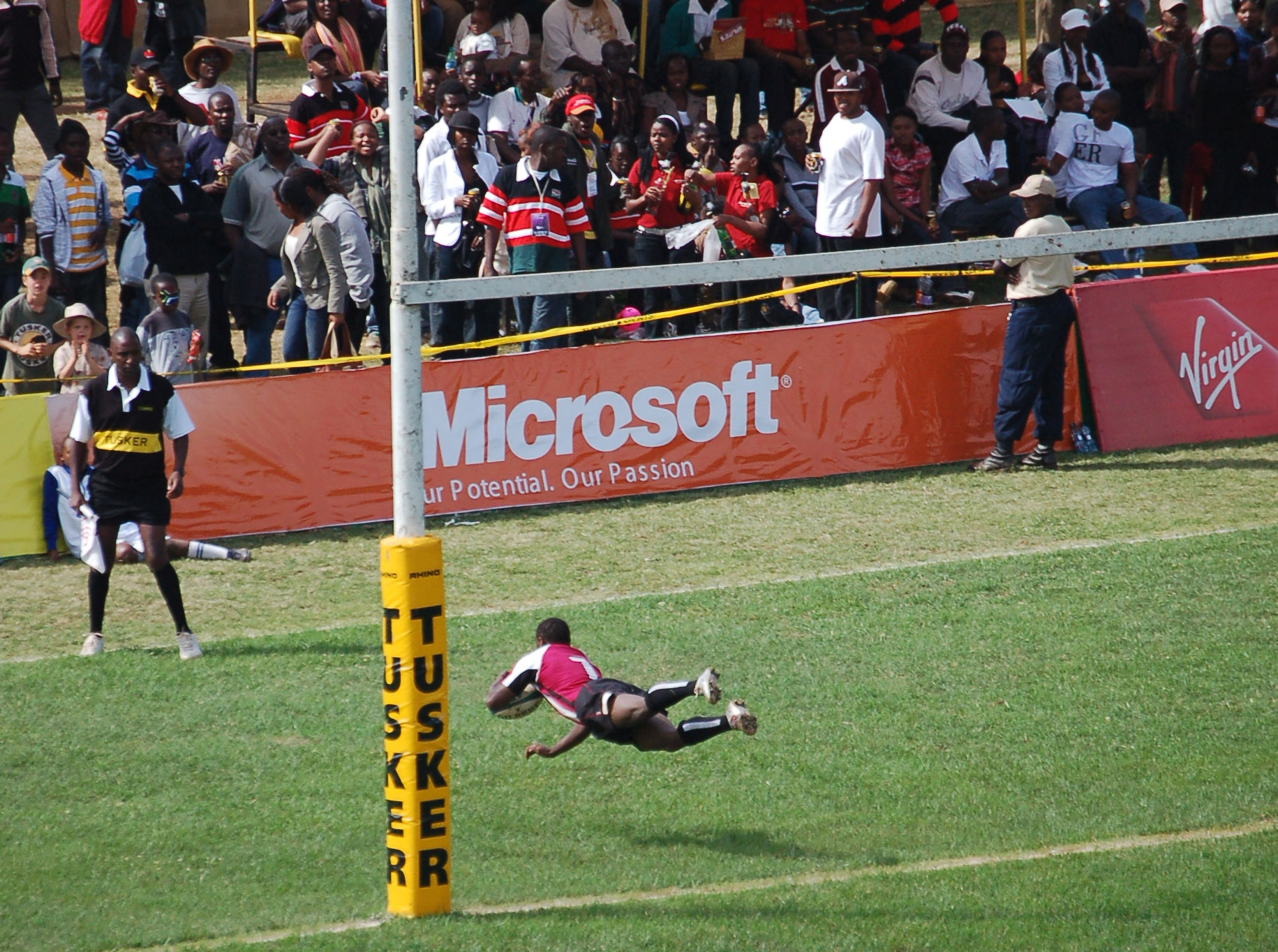
A Bristol University Select player scores a try at the 2008 Safari Sevens, at the RFUEA Ground

The 13th edition of the Safari Sevens saw a rise in the gate fee of KSh200 per person to KSh800, in addition the weather was colder than usual but this did not produce any reduction in the crowds. The spectators included Kenyan Deputy Prime Minister Musalia Mudavadi (who presented the prizes) and former Kenyan Prime Minister Raila Odinga, as well as various other celebrities from the world of Kenyan show business ensuring a constant flow of Hummers, Jaguars and Range Rovers into and out of the car park.

The Fiji Barbarians made their debut at the Safari Sevens in 2008. National teams taking part were Botswana, Emerging Springboks, France A (Les Blues), Japan, Namibia, Tanzania, Tunisia, Uganda, Zambia, Zimbabwe and Kenya. In addition Samurai Sevens (a professional rugby invitation side) and the Kenya A sevens team (Shujaa) and University of Paris also took part. Bristol University Select (a team put together from Bristol University, Clifton RFC and the professional Guinness Premiership side Bristol) returned to take part in the Safari Sevens yet again; they have participated in every Safari Sevens ever staged.

Kenya won the competition beating the Emerging Boks in the final, 31–12. The continued increase in the number of people attending the event and this year's rise in admission caused some critics called for an upgrade in the quantity and quality of seating available for spectators.

Nine nations took part in the 2009 event; Botswana, Japan, Kenya (who finished sixth in the IRB Sevens World Series this year), Morocco, Tunisia, Tanzania, Uganda, Zambia and Zimbabwe.

Other foreign teams included the perennial Bristol University Select from the UK, Hamilton Raiders RFC from South Africa, Les Bleus Sevens from France, and Western Province schoolboys. There was also a Kenyan invitation side the Chairman’s Select. Other local entrants included various Kenya club veterans sides, ladies and schools teams.

Kenya Harlequins won the veterans competition beating a Rift Valley Academy Veterans 17–5, Western Province took the schools title with a 19–0 win over Nyanza, while Mwamba RFC I won the ladies title with a 54–0 win over Vivi.

The refereeing cadre included the IRB elite referees Wayne Barnes and David Rose of England.

=== 2010-2012 ===
The tournament, under title sponsorship from Kenyan mobile telephony giant Safaricom, became known as the Safaricom Sevens, was hosted for the last time at the RFUEA Ground in 2010, shifting to the 35,000 seater Nyayo National Stadium in Nairobi for the 2011 and 2012 edition. The rationale for the venue shift was the exponential rise in crowd numbers, and the RFUEA's inability to host such crowds.

Former World Rugby Sevens Series champions Samoa returned for the 2011 edition, winning the tournament for a second time with a 31-12 win over Samurai Sevens. South Africa Sevens Elite Player Development (EPD) squad which featured Justin Geguld who would later play on the HSBC Sevens World Series won the last tournament to be played at Nyayo, defeating the Kenya Morans coached by Mike Friday 21-17.

=== 2013-2014 ===
When the Kenya Rugby Union revealed that the 2013 tournament would be held at the 60,000 seater Safaricom Stadium located at the Moi International Sports Centre in Kasarani, located in the Northern Suburbs of Nairobi, this announcement was met with skepticism by a section of "rugby diehards" for myriad reasons including the distance of the grandstands to the playing field amongst other factors.

This mattered little as a massive marketing and publicity campaign fronted by title sponsors Safaricom drew in crowds to the Kasarani venue. It is estimated there were an approximate 48000 fans in the stadium on 21 September 2013, the first day of the tournament which featured quality sides in the form of the England Royals and Sevens World Series core sides Spain and Portugal. As the tournament proceeded, news filtered in about a terrorist attack at the Westgate Mall, located several kilometers away. The England Royals, featuring leading England Sevens player Matt Turner, withdrew from the tournament.

This did not put a damper on the tournament as slightly over 20000 fans turned up to watch the final day of the tournament. Kenya Shujaa would beat the Australia Renegades 40-7 to claim the Robin Cahill Trophy, a win that they dedicated to the 67 lives lost at Westgate. Welsh Warriors defeated Argentina 24-17 to win the 2014 edition.

=== Tournament Decline 2015-2016 ===
The tournament nearly didn't take place in 2015 owing to governance issues at the Kenya Rugby Union which led to the then title sponsors Safaricom pulling out. It did eventually take place to poor numbers at a venue that just a year earlier had attracted over 70000 fans over two days. Poor attendance returned to haunt the tournament in 2016 and it is envisaged that the Kenya Rugby Union and its partners will work to woo the fans back to the tournament either via a venue change or a deliberate and aggressive marketing campaign while attracting quality international sides and introducing prize money to the event that was once billed as "Africa's Premier Rugby Sevens Event."

=== Tournament Postponement 2017 ===
The Safari Sevens was postponed in 2017 due to "uncertainty in the prevailing political climate" according to the KRU. Kenya held 2017 Kenyan general election in August 2017 of which the results were disputed.

=== Tournament Comeback 2018-2019 ===
The tournament was reinstated in 2018 at the RFUEA Ground. The 2019 edition of the tournament, with the title sponsorship of Tusker of East African Breweries, attracted the participation of the South Africa Blitzboks, one of the premier sevens teams in the World Rugby Sevens Series, in addition to national teams from Zimbabwe, Zambia, Namibia, Uganda, and Burundi, and club teams Samurai Select, Western Province (South Africa), Russia Academy, Seventise (France), Blue Bulls (Wales), and Narvskaya Zastava (Russia).

The Kenya Morans beat the Bliztboks 19-14 in the final.

== Table of Previous Winners ==
A list of results for all tournaments.

Year	Venue	Cup			Plate	Bowl	Shield
Year	Venue	Winner	Final Score	Runner-up	Winner	Winner	Winner
1996	RFUEA Ground	Public School Wanderers (U.K.)	40-14	Zimbabwe	Kenya	Cumbria Schoolboys	
1997	RFUEA Ground	Kenya	24-21	Cumbria School Boys (U.K.)	Public School Wanderers (U.K.)	Uganda	
1998	RFUEA Ground	Bristol University Select (U.K.)	33-7	Samurai International	Lusaka RFC (Zambia)	Zimbabwe	
1999	RFUEA Ground	Public School Wanderers (U.K.)	25-22	Bristol University Select (U.K.)	Uganda	Kenya Harlequins	
2000	RFUEA Ground	Shujaa (Kenya A)^{[a]}	26-24	Bristol University Select (U.K.)	London Scottish (U.K.)		
2001	RFUEA Ground	British Army	45-26	Bristol University Select (U.K.)			
2002	RFUEA Ground	British Army	40-7	Kenya	London Irish (U.K.)	Ulinzi Stars RFC (Kenya)	Uganda Kobs RFC (Uganda)
2003	RFUEA Ground	Kenya	29-7	Emerging Springboks	Zambia	London Irish (U.K.)	Lagos RFC, Nigeria
2004	RFUEA Ground	Kenya	10-7	Emerging Springboks	Golden Lions (S.A.)	Shujaa (Kenya A)	Kenya Commercial Bank RFC
2005	RFUEA Ground	Samoa	50-5	Western Province (S.A.)	Zimbabwe	Tanzania	
2006	RFUEA Ground	Emerging Springboks	26-22	Zimbabwe	Uganda	Shujaa (Kenya A)	Botswana
2007	RFUEA Ground	Emerging Springboks	27-17	Zimbabwe	Kenya	Tunisia	Zambia
2008	RFUEA Ground	Kenya	31-12	Emerging Springboks	Bristol University Select (U.K.)	Japan	Zambia
2009	RFUEA Ground	Kenya	40-19	Emerging Springboks	Hamilton Raiders RFC (S.A.)	Bristol University Select (U.K.)	Japan
2010	RFUEA Ground	Kenya	17-12	Emerging Springboks	Ponsonby RFC (N.Z.)	Argentina	Hamilton Raiders RFC (S.A.)
2011	Nyayo National Stadium	Samoa	31-12	Samurai Sevens	Auckland Vikings (N.Z.)	(Tackling Cancer) Tiger Rugby (USA)	Uganda
2012	Nyayo National Stadium	South Africa Elite Programme Development	21-17	Kenya	Samurai International	Western Province	Zambia
2013	Moi International Sports Centre	Kenya	40-7	Australia Renegades	Samurai Sevens	Grenoble	KCB RFC
2014	Moi International Sports Centre	Welsh Warriors	24-17	Argentina	Kenya	Germany	Golden Lions
2015	Moi International Sports Centre	Samurai International	20-19	Kenya	England Saxons	Kenya Morans	Zambia
2016	Moi International Sports Centre	Kenya	38-21	Samurai International	Cape Warriors	Homeboyz	
2017	Event Not Held	None		None	None	None	None
2018	RFUEA Ground	Samurai International					
2019	RFUEA Ground	Kenya Morans	19-14	South Africa Blitzboks	Kenya Shujaa	Seventise France	Western Province

== Notes ==
a. In 2000 Kenya won the right to host the Africa Zone Qualifying Tournament for the 2001 Rugby World Cup Sevens Finals. Rather than cancel the Safari Sevens they combined both events into a three-day festival. The Kenya sevens side did not therefore take part in the Safari Sevens; Shujaa the Kenya 'A' side carried the hopes of the home crowd and did not disappoint, winning the cup.
