= Magician (song) =

"Ma'Gyptian (Magician Remix)"

Single by Ice Prince featuring Gyptian
- Released: 4 March 2012
- Recorded: 2011
- Genre: hip hop, reggae
- Length: 3:34
- Label: Chocolate City
- Songwriters: Panshak Zamani and Windel Beneto Edwards
- Producer: Jesse Jagz

Ice Prince singles chronology
"Juju" (2011)	"Ma'Gyptian (Magician Remix)" (2012)	"Aboki" (2012)

"Magician" is a song by Nigerian rapper Ice Prince. It features rap verses from Yung L and J-Milla and was originally released on Ice Prince's debut studio album, Everybody Loves Ice Prince (2011). The song's official remix, titled "Ma'Gyptian (Magician Remix)", was produced by Jesse Jagz and features vocals by Jamaican singer Gyptian.

== Background and recording ==
In an interview with Adeola Adeyemo, Ice Prince revealed that Spinlet organized the song's collaboration. Additionally, he declared that he is a huge fan of Gyptian's music and chose to get in touch with the singer who was in Nigeria for a gig at Calabar Carnival. On the same day that he recorded the song with Gyptian, Ice Prince also filmed the music video with Clarence Peters.

== BBC Radio 1Xtra airplay ==
Ice Prince introduced "Ma'Gyptian (Magician Remix)" to Radio 1Xtra listeners while speaking to Tim Westwood at BBC Radio 1Xtra .

== Music video ==
The accompanying music video for the song was filmed in Lagos by Peters. It was made available on March 20, 2012, a few days following the release of the audio.

== Track listing ==
Digital single

No.	Title	Writer(s)	Producer(s)	Length
1.	"Ma'Gyptian (Magician Remix)" (featuring Gyptian)	Panshak Zamani and Windel Beneto Edwards	Jesse Jagz	3:34
