= Ruff Kid =

Zambian singer, songwriter and rapper

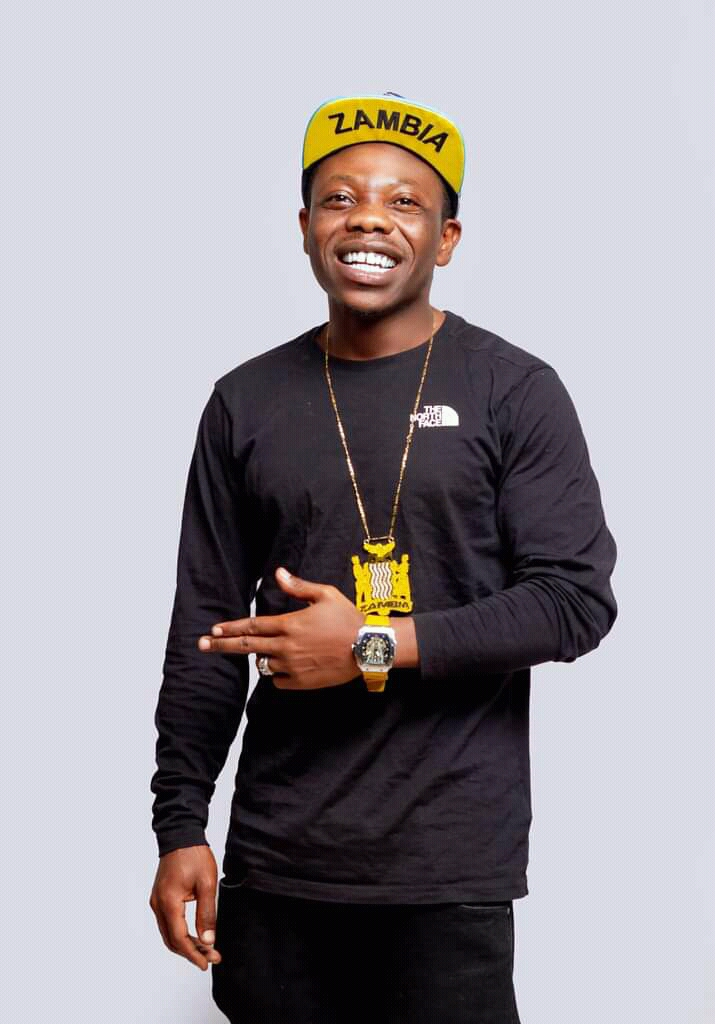
- The Zambian Music Messiah

Background information
- Born: Masautso Nkhoma; March 17, 1986 (age 40); Kitwe
- Occupations: Rapper; songwriter
- Years active: 2004–present
- Musical career
- Genres: Hip Hop; Trap; Gospel Hip-Hop
- Instrument: Vocals
- Labels: Kang'ono Records; XYZ Entertainment; Kalandanya Music Promotions

Masautso Nkhoma (born March 17, 1986) known professionally as Ruff Kid is a Zambian rapper and songwriter. He debuted in 2004 with his single Wekatemwikwa. Because of the rough childhood he went through, he decide to name himself Ruff Kid, a name that will always depict of his hard life growing up. In 2012 he won a BEFFTA award in the category of best international act beating other African music heavy weights such as Zahara, Camp Mulla, Cover Driver, D’banj and Grace Galaxy

== Early life ==
Masautso Nkhoma was born in 1986 in Kitwe. He was raised in Cha cha cha, township of Kitwe. Ruff Kid was raised by a single parent, his mother, Getrude Nkhoma. He attended Machona Primary School, grades 1-4, and then later attended Nyanje Basic, grades 4-7. His family moved to Lusaka where he was enrolled at Lusaka Boys Secondary School for grades 8-9. He completed his high school at Chongwe Secondary School. In third grade, the music of Tu-pac Shakur influenced him to get into rap. In 2000 he met Mainza who helped him record his first single "Wekatemwika"

== Music career ==
=== 2004–2011: Early years ===
Ruff Kid's music career started in 2000. His first single, Wekatemwika, was released in 2004. The song was an immediate success earning him the number 1 spot on the African international music charts on Channel O and the Urban Massive show. The same year Dream records released his debut album "All 4 U". His second studio album Matured was released the following year with Joe Chibungu as his producer.

Ruff Kid's second album gave him the opportunity to tour Southern Africa. He performed with some of the industry's greats such as Kabelo Mabalane, Oliver Mtukudzi, Yvonne Chaka Chaka, Jozi and Zola.

He then released his third album “Most Wanted” in 2006. The album had some controversial hits such as Chikalalila. Chikalalila caused some controversy not only in Zambia, but also in other neighbouring countries. The song seemed to reveal truths about a number of artists' private lives.

In 2007 Ruff kid won multiple awards namely the Born N'Bred Award(s) (in the category of Best Hip-hop video), CBC Music video Award and Radio Awards.

=== 2012-20 ===
In 2012 he added the BEFFTA Awards to his list of achievements in the category, best international act, beating other African music heavy weights such as Zahara, Camp Mulla, Cover Driver, D’banj and Grace Galaxy.

In late 2013 Ruff Kid released his fourth studio album titled the Naked Truth. The album was criticised for its controversial album cover. After a successful album release, he toured the USA and released a number of singles which was Mwaiseni, Lesa Wamaka and Hule that featured Chef 187. He described Lesa Wamaka as a "testimony of God's Grace on his life". The song got a lot of public praise as it resonated with the masses.

=== 2021-Present ===
In 2021, he released his much acclaimed Trap anthem "Banja" (Which means "family" in the Zambian native language). The song featured South African rapper Emtee, with whom he continued his international footprint. Critics described the song as "a perfect blend of the genre".

In 2022, he was nominated for the South African Hip Hop Awards in the category of Best International Act, along with other big hip hop names like Kendrick Lamar, Dax and others.

== Discography ==
=== Studio albums ===
- All 4 U All - 2004
- Matured - 2006
- Most Wanted - 2007
- Naked Truth - 2013
