= Camp Mulla =

Kenyan alternative hip-hop group

- Camp Mulla side-stage just before performing live at Kulture 2026

Background information
- Origin: Nairobi, Kenya
- Genres: Alternative hip hop; kapuka; pop-rap; R&B
- Years active: 2009–2013, 2017, 2026
- Label: Sub Sahara
- Past members: Karun; Kus Ma; Shappaman; Taio Tripper; Mykie Tooni
- Website: campmulla.wordpress.com

Camp Mulla was an alternative hip hop group originating from and based in Nairobi, Kenya. The group rose to prominence with the release of their single "Party Don't Stop" on 31 August 2010, with that and their subsequent works earning them a nomination for Best International Act (Africa) at the 2012 BET Awards. Following the release of their debut studio album, Funky Town, the group's lead singer Karun and rapper Taio both left the group to pursue higher education and solo careers. In September 2017 the main four members announced their reunion at The Wave performance at the Waterfront, Ng'ong racecourse, but soon after disbanded again. The group's musical style, fashion sense and origins have drawn comparisons to The Black Eyed Peas, while they have also been criticised for making "bubblegum music".

== History ==
=== 2009–2012: Beginnings, rise to fame and Funky Town ===
After releasing a series of experimental projects, manager Mykie Tooni and rappers Shappaman (then known as Young Kass) and Taio (then known as Taio Tripper) co-founded the group in mid-2009, with Karun (then Miss Karun) and Kus Ma (then K'Cous) joining later. Initially distributing their music online via ReverbNation, SoundCloud and SoundClick for digital download, their song "Low" was the first to gain radio airplay, having been introduced by radio presenter Eve D'Souza on Capital FM when it debuted on radio in 2009.

On 31 August 2010, Camp Mulla released their first single, "Party Don't Stop", to generally positive critical acclaim, peaking at number 2 on Capital FM's "Hits Not Homework" playlist and number 13 on Homeboyz Radio's "HitList". This and other songs that followed earned them several awards, including the "Teeniez' Group or Collabo" and "Teeniez' Nu Artist" awards at the 2012 Chaguo La Teeniez Awards held on 20 April 2012. Camp Mulla made their first public appearance on 12 February 2011 at Collo's Valentine's Day concert, where he revealed the music video for his new song "Chini ya Maji". They then served as the opening act for Nigerian R&B duo P-Square at a live performance at The Carnivore on 26 February 2011, and opened for Nigerian acts such as Naeto C and Flavour at Naija 9te (or Naija Nite) in October 2011. The group was billed to perform at the Big Brother Africa 7 opening ceremony alongside J. Cole, Davido, Aemo E'Face, P-Square, Naeto C and Flavour on 6 May 2012, but did not make the show due to delays in their travelling documentation. However, they went on to perform on the program's first eviction show on 13 May 2012. Camp Mulla also performed at the grand finale of the fifth season of Tusker Project Fame in 2012.

Camp Mulla was nominated for Best International Act (Africa) at the 2012 BET Awards—becoming the first Kenyans ever to be nominated for a BET award in the process—alongside Lira, Mokobé and Ice Prince, but lost out to eventual winners Sarkodie and Wizkid. On 29 September 2012, the group released their debut studio album, Funky Town.

=== 2013–2016: Departures and solo projects ===
In May 2013, Sub Sahara announced that lead singer Karun was leaving to pursue a solo career and further studies in the United States, with rapper Thee MC Africa also leaving to pursue a solo career. Tiri Murai (known mononymously as Tiri), another Kenyan singer and Kus Ma's girlfriend, was brought in to replace Karun in June 2013 after performing live with the group at the MTV Africa All Stars concert in Durban, South Africa the previous month. On 22 August 2013, Kus Ma released a solo mixtape entitled J's and Purple, while Tiri followed up with a mixtape of her own, Nefertiri, on 8 March 2014. On 20 April 2015, coinciding with the 4/20 celebrations, Shappaman released an extended play entitled Wild Life on Tape. He followed that up with a mixtape entitled Love Wild on 2 March 2016.

=== 2017–2018: Reunion and second album ===
Camp Mulla at their first reunion show in 2017 The Wave concert at Ngong Racecourse in Nairobi

On 10 September 2017, Camp Mulla announced their return from hiatus with a performance featuring t at The Wave concert at the Ngong Racecourse in Nairobi. The group is reportedly set to release their second studio album, with a date yet to be officially confirmed.

== Musical style ==
A majority of Camp Mulla's songs incorporate hip hop and contemporary R&B. They call their musical style "2-5-Flow" or "254Low" (pronounced "two five flow"), which is a play on Kenya's calling code +254.

== Members ==
Current members

- Kus Ma (born Marcus Kibukosya; formerly K'Cous) – Record producer, songwriter, rapper
- Shappaman (born Benoît Kanema; formerly Young Ka$$) – Rapper, record producer, songwriter
- Karun (born Karungari Mungai; formerly Miss Karun) – Lead singer, songwriter, Music Producer
- Taio (born Matthew Wakhungu; formerly Taio Tripper) – Rapper, singer, lyricist
- Mykie Tooni (born Michael Mutooni) – Manager

== Discography ==
=== Studio albums ===
| Title | Album details |
|---|---|
| Funky Town (2012) | Released: 29 September 2012; Label: Sub Sahara; Formats: CD, digital download |

=== Singles ===
| Title | Year | Album |
|---|---|---|
| "Party Don't Stop" (featuring Collo) | 2010 | Funky Town |
| "Feel No Pain" | 2011 | Funky Town |
| "Fresh All Day" | 2012 | Funky Town |
| "Hold It Down" | 2012 | Funky Town |

=== Music videos ===
List of music videos with directors, showing year released
| Title | Year | Director(s) |
|---|---|---|
| "Walkin' on a Dream" (Remix of "Walking on a Dream" by Empire of the Sun) | 2011 | Camp Mulla |
| "Party Don't Stop" (featuring Collo) | 2011 | Clarence Peters |
| "Addicted" | 2011 | Clarence Peters |
| "Fresh All Day" | 2012 | Andrew Macharia |
| "Hold It Down" | 2012 | Clarence Peters |
| "Feel No Pain" | 2012 | Private19 |
| "If You Believe" | 2013 | Enos Olik |
| "oH mA gAd" (featuring WondaBoy) | 2013 | Kevin Bosco, Jr. |
| "All In" (featuring M.anifest) | 2013 | Kevin Bosco, Jr. |
| "Look @ Me Now" (featuring Kanja and M.anifest) | 2013 | Kevin Bosco, Jr. |
| "Chafua" (featuring Collo and Tiri) | 2013 | Kevin Bosco, Jr. |

=== Solo discography ===
Kus Ma

- J's and Purple (2013)

Shappaman

- Wild Life on Tape (2015)
- Love Wild (2016)

== Awards and nominations ==
| Year | Event | Recipient | Award | Result | Reference(s) |
|---|---|---|---|---|---|
| 2012 | BEFFTA Awards | Camp Mulla | Best International Act | Nominated | |
| 2012 | BET Awards | Camp Mulla | Best International Act (Africa) | Nominated | |
| 2012 | Channel O Music Video Awards | "Party Don't Stop" | Best Newcomer Video | Nominated | |
| 2012 | Channel O Music Video Awards | "Fresh All Day" | Best Duo, Group or Featuring Video | Nominated | |
| 2012 | Channel O Music Video Awards | "Party Don't Stop" | Best East African Video | Nominated | |
| 2012 | Channel O Music Video Awards | "Fresh All Day" | Video of the Year | Nominated | |
| 2012 | Chaguo La Teeniez Awards | "Party Don't Stop" | Teeniez' Group or Collabo | Won | |
| 2012 | Chaguo La Teeniez Awards | Camp Mulla | Teeniez' Nu Artist | Won | |
| 2012 | The Headies | Camp Mulla | African Artist of the Year | Nominated | |
| 2012 | Kora Awards | Camp Mulla | Best African Group | Nominated | |
| 2012 | MOBO Awards | Camp Mulla | Best African Act | Nominated | |
| 2012 | MTV Europe Music Awards | Camp Mulla | Best African Act | Nominated | |
