= B'Flow =

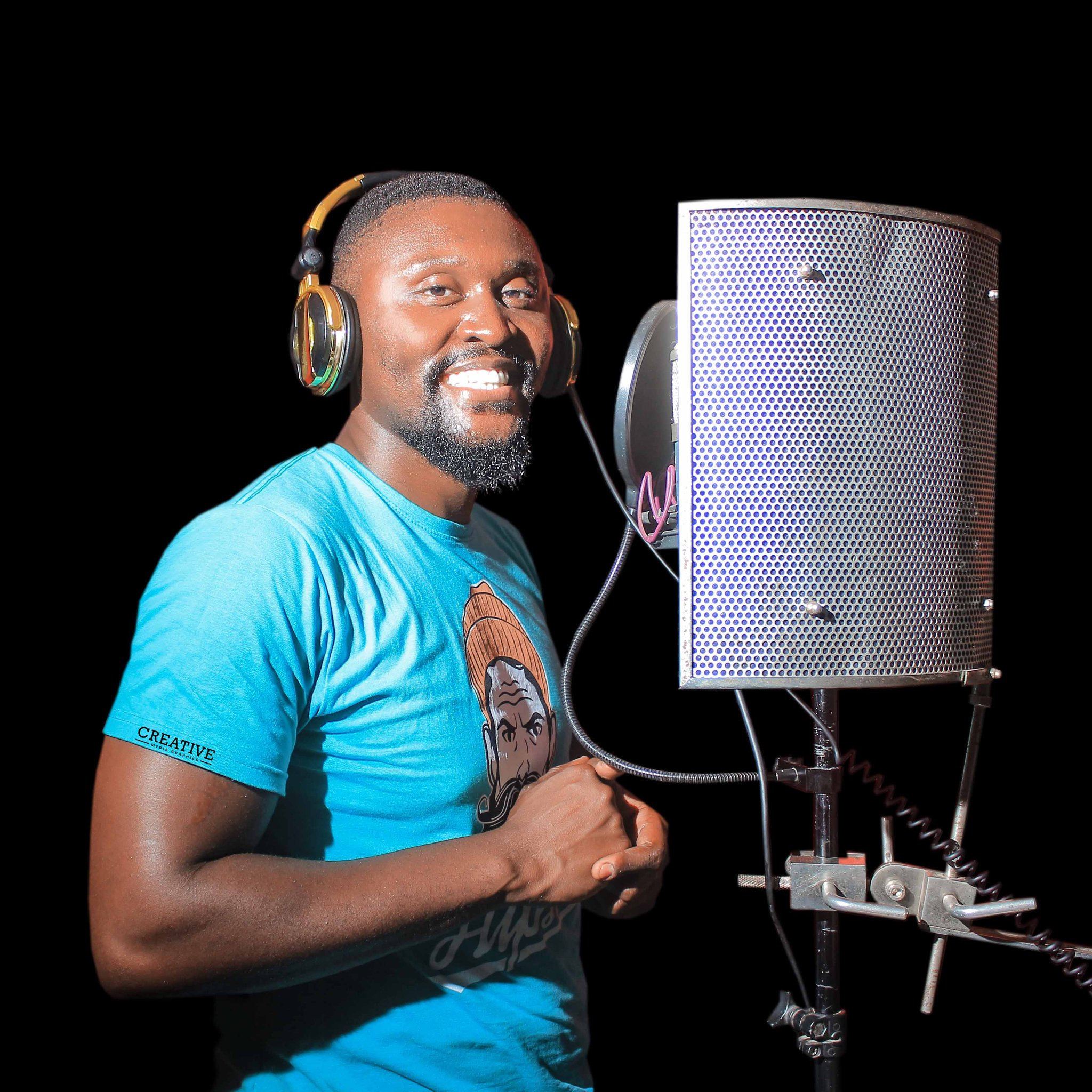
- B'Flow in the studio in May 2023.
- Born: Brian Mumba Kasoka Bwembya; November 12, 1986 (age 39); Kabwe, Zambia
- Other names: B Flow; Junior Obama; Dancehall Champion; Mr Chant-it-on
- Occupations: Musician; Record Producer; Human Rights Activist
- Musical career
- Genres: Dancehall; Hip hop; KaliDanceHall
- Instrument: Vocals
- Years active: 2005-present
- Labels: Music For Change; Romaside (Former); ZedWay; K-Army
- Website: musicforchange.info

Brian Mumba Kasoka Bwembya known professionally as B Flow (B'Flow or B-Flow), is a Zambian musician, media personality, humanitarian, philanthropist, social justice advocate, and founder of Music For Change. He served as Chairperson of the HIV/AIDS and Social Commentary (HASC) committee of the Zambia Association of Musicians (ZAM) from 2014 to 2017, before being elected to the position of Publicity Secretary in 2018. He is the global ambassador in the fight against HIV/AIDS for American organization AIDS Healthcare Foundation (AHF) and also the first Zambian artist in the world to launch an album at a US Embassy. The event was sponsored by the United States government through the embassy. The stage name B Flow was inspired by people who loved his 'flow'. B Flow also took a new direction with his music, changing his genre to what is now known as “KaliDanceHall” (A mix of traditional Zambian Kalindula music and Dance Hall). In November 2016, the United Nations Population Fund (UNFPA) named B Flow as one of the 16 voices of activism against gender-based violence around the world.

== Early life ==
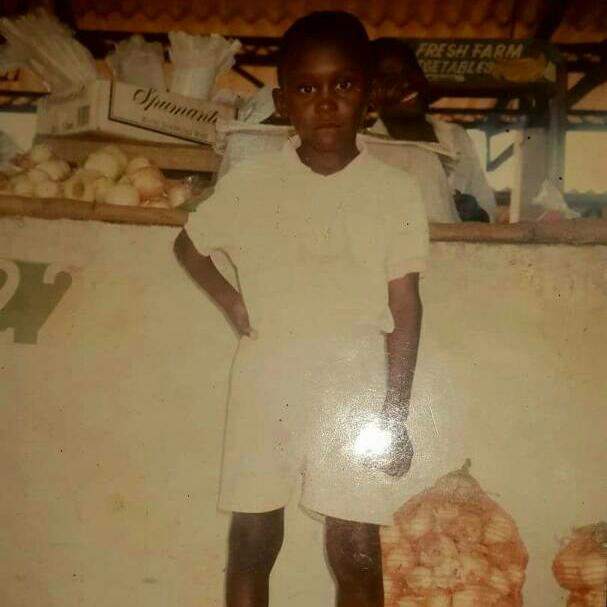
Young Brian getting ready for school.

Bwembya was born in Kabwe and raised by his grandmother Matilda Chiti-Byrne and his mother Mirriam Mulenga Mumba Byrne, a policewoman. His father Mathews "Mizzy" Kasoka was a football coach for Kabwe Warriors football club. B flow comes from a family of renowned Zambian musicians like Chris Mbewe of The Great Witch Band, Anna Mwale of The Mwale Sisters and Ras Willie . B Flow's grandmother Matilda was a teacher by profession and she taught him how to read and write English which then became his favourite subject. When he was 6 years old, he enrolled at Kasanda Malombe Primary School. In 2nd Grade, he joined the Boy Scouts. He left the club shortly after and became a basketball player which he played for fun for about 7 years.

At 8, he and his friends played a small band by turning pots and buckets into drums and making Banjos(non-electric guitars) using tins, planks and strings.

In 4th Grade, Brian and his mother moved to Serenje with where he joined the poetry club at Serenje Boma School. The following year, Brian learned how to beat the African drum and became a drummer and singer in the school cultural group. He was also one of the only two male dancers in the group. At the age of 11 he started listening to reggae music a collection that his mom owned and his love for reggae music started to grow with likes of Bob Marley being hits of his early childhood. In 7th Grade, B Flow and his brother were transferred back to Kabwe where they attended Broadway Primary and Basic School and he was always punished for singing and drumming in class by his class teacher at his new school. At age 13, he formed a group called Natty Boys, however the group only performed at one party and disbanded because B Flow was the only member who had the ability to compose songs and the confidence to sing in front of people, while the rest of the members were shy. He then formed Hot Kays which consisted of B Flow and Zed Pride's Ron Kay, the duo dedicated their time learning the art of song writing, rhyming and arranging lyrics B Flow then known as Attic B, specialised in Rap and Ragga while Ron Kay specialised in R&B.

B'Flow tells his life story in his native language Bemba

During his 10 Grade at Kabwe High School Brian joined the Anti-AIDS/Drug Club the same year, where he actively participated in quiz and singing. In 3rd term of Grade 10, Brian was elected vice president for the Anti-AIDS/Drug Club because of his dedication to counselling his fellow pupils who used to smoke Marijuana and drink alcohol. Brian mobilized new members and taught the club about HIV and drugs. He also raised awareness on HIV/AIDS through song and led the club during candlelight walks and visits to AIDS hospices. He was later trained by the Kabwe Adventist Family Health Institute (KAFHI) and the Students Partnership Worldwide (SPW) as a peer educator. His club won a number of quiz & talent competitions(Music, Drama and Poetry) on AIDS & Drug awareness in central province. B Flow always performed at most of the school functions which included closing ceremonies, World AIDS Day event, debate competitions and other school parties.

After his final year of high school, B Flow moved to Lusaka to live with his uncles and enrolled into college. He studied marketing and social science at the National Institute of Public Administration and University of Zambia. Whilst in university, B Flow was selected for a Peer Educators' training, sponsored by the Society For Family Health(SFH) in 2008. In 2012, B Flow started to use music to continue his peer education and influence social change.

B Flow's musical influence came from musicians like Nasty-D, DaNNY, Sean Paul, Elephant Man, Beanie Man, MC Wabwino, Black Muntu, Master Flo, Sam Kuli and Alubusu.

== Music and career ==
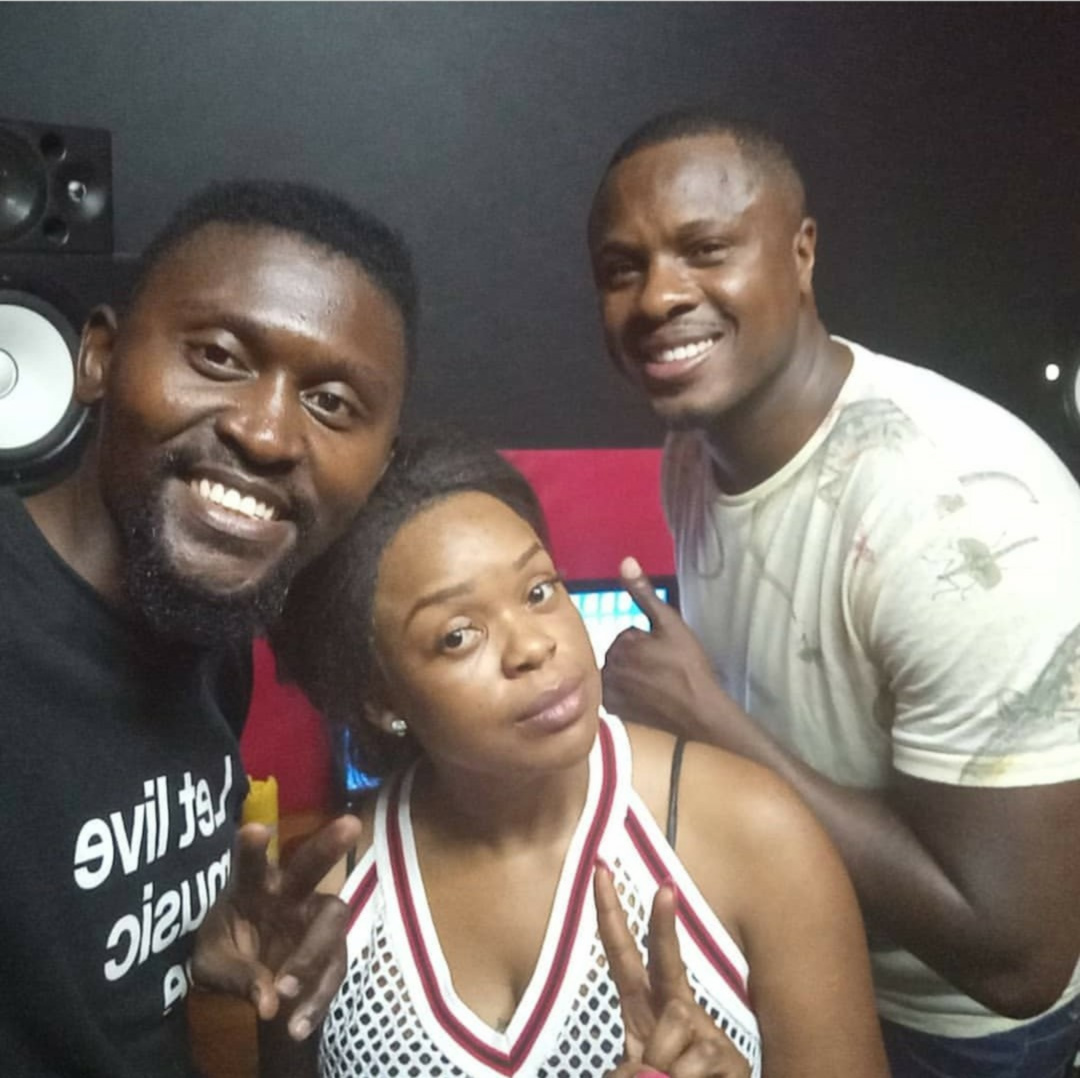
B Flow with Mampi and KB Killa Beats

Mr Ignatius Chongwe nicknamed as Lawyer Without Boarders [sic] discovered B Flow's singing talent after he performed at a talent show at Sacred Heart Parish in Kabwe in 2004 and the later that year Mr Chongwe started to sponsor B Flow's professional music career. B Flow's first album Mpu mpu mpu (meaning heartbeat)was released in 2009. The album earned B Flow recognition at the 2009 Zambia Ngoma Awards where he was nominated in the Best New Artist Category the album has songs like Bubblegum Lover, Energizer, Mosikito and the album title track Mpu Mpu Mpu. His second solo album called 'No More Kawilo' was released in 2011(meaning no more loneliness). His third album 'Voiceless Woman' was released in 2013. He also had the privilege to share the stage with international artists such as Brick & Lace, Oliver Mtukuzi, P-Square and Jah Cure. B Flow is a brand ambassador for a number of non-governmental organizations the AIDS Health Care Foundation(AHF), USAID-funded SHARe II, the Obama Foundation, National HIV/AIDS/STI/TB Council in Zambia and the Keep Zambia Clean, Green and Healthy campaign he is also the chairman for the HIV/AIDS and Social Commentary(HASC) team of the Zambia Association of Musicians(ZAM). B Flow is also a part of the Zambia/Norway(ZedWay) project.

=== Recognition ===
Former US President Barack Obama gave special recognition to B Flow when delivering his speech to the 2015 Mandela Leadership Fellows on August 3 in Washington, D.C. President Obama spoke highly of the artist for using his music to advocate against gender-based violence and to educate youths on HIV/AIDS.

In 2017 B Flow was invited to launch of the inaugural Obama Foundation Summit in Chicago, United States by the former US President Barack Obama and former FLOTUS Michelle Obama. B Flow announced the update on his Facebook page. “I will attend the first ever Obama Summit and the launch of Obama foundation which was recently established,” B flow said. “I thank God that since 2015, our partnership has grown and the Obama ‘s are still supporting my work in various ways”. He we went on to say I don't take the privilege of receiving an invitation from Obama for granted, it shows that there is really something am doing right. I’am a very open person, those who are interested in learning some things know that am an open person. I'm always happy to represent the African continent on a global scale. In 2015, President Obama ended his YALI Presidential Summit speech by saying ‘So Brian, we are proud to be your partner!’ I say yes indeed, the partnership is amazing”,

== Music and election ==
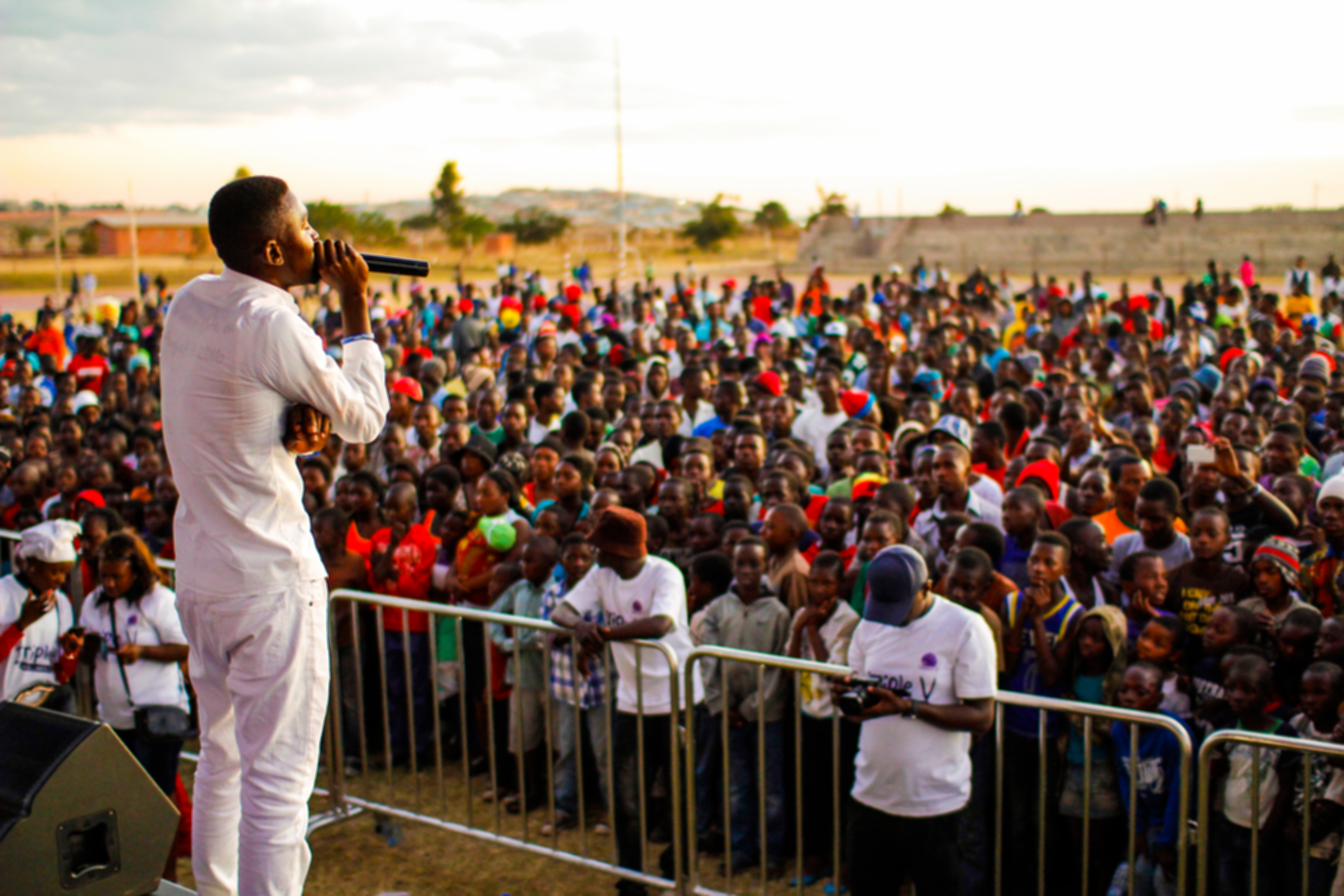
B'Flow on stage at the independence stadium in Lusaka. (2016)

During the launch of his fifth album, Dear Mama, B Flow also launched his "Go Out and Vote" campaign phase II with his partner, Young Women in Action. To deliver the voter education message to the youth ensured that the targeted voters be ready, willing, and able to participate fully in the 2016 election process in Zambia. The Go Out To Vote project aims at addressing voter apathy amongst young people in Zambia by encouraging them to register as voters, verify their details in the voter register and finally go out and vote during the 2016 elections.

=== Triple V Campaign ===
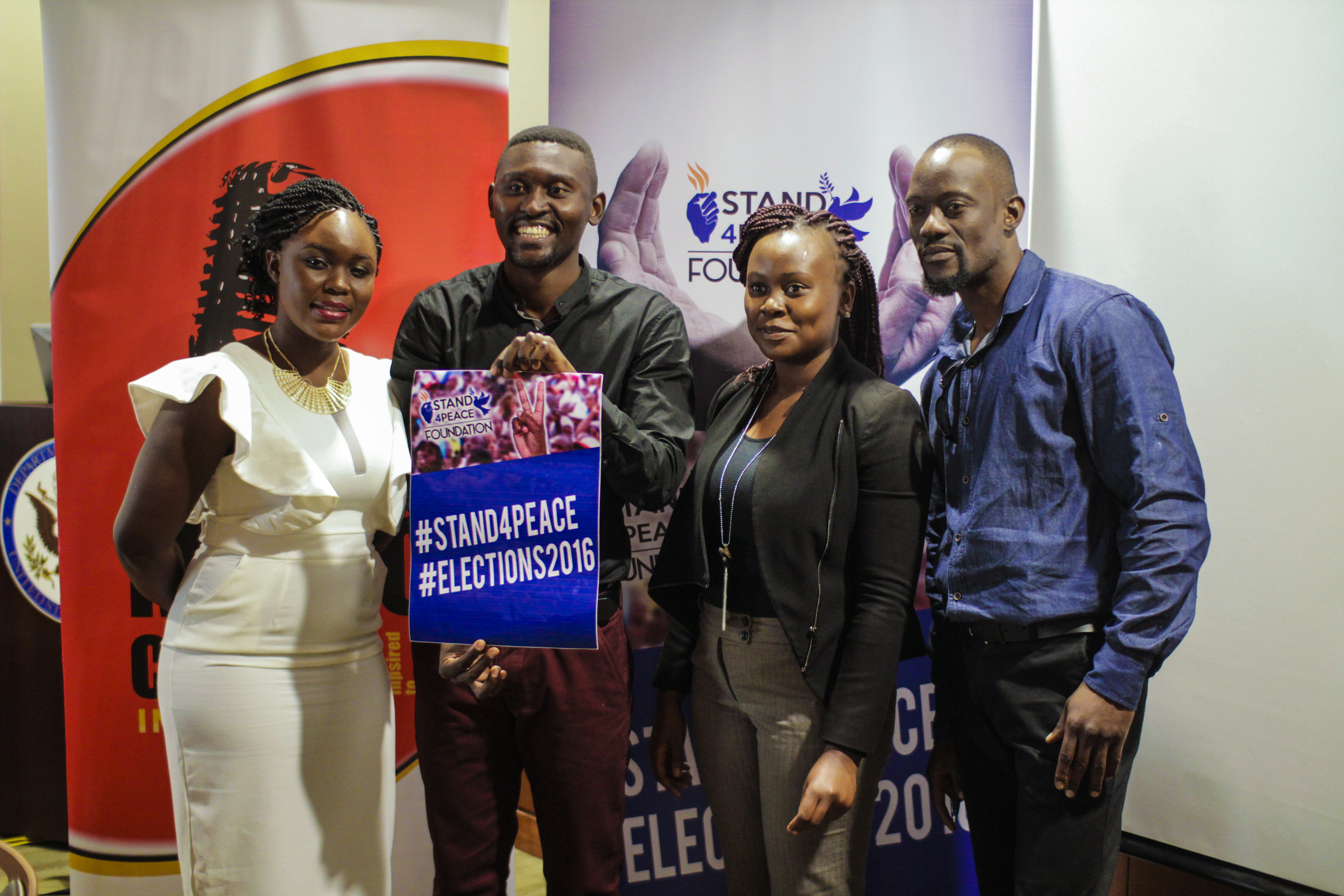
Kantu, B'Flow and Cactus Agony (far right) at the US Embassy in Lusaka during the Triple V Campaign in 2016

Triple V which stands for My Vote, My Voice, My Victory was a voter education project which used to motivate young and newly registered voters to go out and vote in the August 2016. Triple reached out to young voters through music and social media.

The project was working with B Flow, Kan 2 and Dj 800 in undertaking roadshows. During the roadshows, the artists used to sensitise young people on the important of participating in elections.

==== Negative response ====
The campaign had been a successful program but in 2015 while in Mongu B-Flow and fellow Triple V members got some negative response as some fans ended up crashing B-Flow's car during the aftermath of the show.

== Young African leaders initiative ==
In 2015 the United States Embassy in Zambia, selected B Flow to represent Zambia in President Obama's Young African Leaders Initiative ( Mandela Washington Fellowship ). He participated in the US government sponsored program for 3 months in different US cities.

"" And I know you’ve been busy. Over the past few weeks, at schools and businesses all across America, you’ve been taking courses, developing the skills you’ll need to make your ideas a reality, so that you're able to continue the great work that you’re already doing, but take it to the next level. That’s what Brian Bwembya of Zambia plans to do. Where’s Brian? Where is he?

So Brian uses music to advocate against things like gender based violence and educate youths on HIV / AIDS . While in the US he has learnt about our health care system, met the Founder of the American H .I. V Organisation and now he plans to start a record label for music about social change. So Brian we are proud to be your partner "

— President Obama talking about B'Flow

"" Woops! Did 3 interviews today; Voice of America (VOA), US National Public Radio (NPR) and CSSI. What have you guys been up to? Let's chat…Chant it on #MusicForChange ""

"" This is one of the happiest days of my life . I wish my mother was alive to witness this one ! "

— B'Flow posting on his Facebook Page

During the program United States President Barack Obama addressed over 700 young Africans and US officials and made a speech in which he endorsed B Flow for his excellent work in using his music to advocate against gender based violence and educating youth on HIV/AIDS. President Obama also announced the formation of B Flow's record company. B Flow is first artist in the world to be endorsed by a US president publicly. Obama's Young African Leaders Initiative (YALI), also awarded B Flow a highly competitive Professional Development Experience (PDE) to work in the American music industry with US company, Okayafrica, in New York. American organisation AIDS Healthcare Foundation (AHF) also appointed B Flow as global ambassador in the fight against HIV/AIDS. He is part of the organization's global 20 by 20 Campaign.

== Awards and nominations ==
Year	Award	Category	Result
2009	Ngoma Awards	Best Upcoming Artist of the Year	Nominated
2009	Born and Bred Awards	best Ragga Video Of The Year	Nominated
2009	Hone Fm	Best Upcoming Artist of the Year	Nominated
2010	Radio Phoenix/Zain	Best Collaboration Of The Year	Nominated
2011	Radio Phoenix	Best Song Of The Year	Nominated
2011	Born & Bred Video Awards	Best Conscious Video	Won
2012	Born & Bred Video Awards	Best Dance hall Video	Won
2013	Zambian Music Awards	Best Dancehall Artist	Nominated
2014	Zambian Music Awards	Best Mainstream Album	Nominated
2014	Zambian Music Awards	Best Collaboration Song	Nominated
2014	Zambian Music Awards	Best Dance hall Artist	Won
2014	Zambian Music Awards	Best Dance hall Album	Won
2014	Born & Bred Awards	Best Conscious Video	Nominated
2014	Born & Bred Awards	Best Dance hall Video	Nominated
2014	Born & Bred Awards	Best Collaboration Video	Nominated
2014	Born & Bred Awards	Most Educative Album	Won
2017	Kwacha Music Awards	Best International Achievement	Nominated
2017	Kwacha Music Awards	Best Humanitarian Award	Won
2017	Kwacha Music Awards	Best Artist (Central Province	Nominated
2017	Kwacha Music Awards	Best Conscious Song (Know Your Status) - B Flow & Just Slim	Nominated
2018	Kwacha Music Award	Best International Achievement Award	Won

=== Other awards ===
1. 2013 HIV/AIDS Awareness Ambassadors' Certificate- USAID Funded SHARe II Project
2. 2014 Zambian representative at Africa Re-imagination Creative Hub(ARCH) Conference African Union, Addis Ababa, Ethiopia
3. 2015 Symbol of excellence-Unique positive stance in music - New York Mwape Peer Award
4. 2018 Presidential Award from the Zambia Medical Association.

== Discography ==
=== Studio albums ===
List of studio albums, with selected information
Title	Album details	Certification
Mpu Mpu Mpu	Released: 2008/2009; Label:Romaside; Formats: CD, Digital download	
Dabo Trabo	Released: 2010; Label: Romaside/Chant-it-on Music & Media; Formats: CD, Digital download	
No More Kawilo	Released: 2012; Label: Romaside/Chant-it-on Music & Media; Formats: CD, Digital download	
Voiceless Woman	Released: 2013; Label: Romaside/Chant-it-on Music & Media; Formats: CD, Digital download	
Dear Mama	Released: 2016; Label: Romaside/Chant-it-on Music & Media; Formats: CD, Digital download	
