= Party Don't Stop =

Single by Camp Mulla featuring Collo

from the album Funky Town
- Released: August 31, 2010
- Recorded: 2010
- Genre: Alternative hip hop; kapuka rap; EDM
- Length: 4:12; 4:08 (album version)
- Label: Sub Sahara
- Songwriter(s): Wakhungu, Kanema, M. Kibukosya, Mungai, Collins Majale
- Producer(s): K'Cous

Camp Mulla singles chronology
| "Low" (2010) | "Party Don't Stop" (2010) | "Feel No Pain" (2011) |

Collo singles chronology
| "Party Don't Stop" (2010) | "Chini ya Maji" (2011) |

Music video
- Party Don't Stop on YouTube

"Party Don't Stop" is the debut single by Kenyan alternative hip hop group Camp Mulla, featuring Kenyan rapper Collo. It peaked at #2 on 98.4 Capital FM's radio playlist Hits Not Homework and at #13 on Homeboyz Radio's HitList, making it Camp Mulla's most successful single so far. The single won an award for "Teeniez' Group or Collabo" at the 2012 Chaguo La Teeniez Awards.

== Music video ==
The music video for the song was released on Camp Mulla's YouTube channel on September 16, 2011. It was shot at the underground parking lot of the Westgate shopping mall in Nairobi, Kenya.

== Track listing ==
Digital download

| No. | Title | Producer(s) | Length |
|---|---|---|---|
| 1. | "Party Don't Stop" (featuring Collo) | K'Cous | 4:12 |

=== Remixes ===
The following is a list of remixes made of the song and are not included in the official single.

Digital download

| No. | Title | Producer(s) | Length |
|---|---|---|---|
| 1. | "Party Don't Stop (DJ Shinski Remix)" (featuring Collo) | DJ Shinski | 3:51 |
| 2. | "Party Don't Stop (Tendaness Remix)" (featuring Collo) | Tendaness | 7:59 |
| 3. | "Party Don't Stop (Wavy Remix)" (featuring Collo) | Carlos Wavy | 4:02 |

== Airplay ==
| Station | Playlist | Peak position |
|---|---|---|
| Capital FM | Hits Not Homework | 2 |
| Homeboyz Radio | HitList | 13 |
