= 8th African Muzik Magazine Awards =

2021 African music awards

- Date: 12 December 2021
- Venue: Virtual event; multiple venues
- Country: United States
- Website: afrimma.com

The 8th African Muzik Magazine Awards ceremony was held on 12 December 2021, virtually with the theme, "Flavors of Africa". The awards celebrated African music and African artists. The nominees were announced on 4 October 2021. Burna Boy, Diamond Platnumz and Tayc received the most nominations with six each, ahead of Wizkid, Fally Ipupa and Dadju, who were tied for the second-most nominations with five nods each.

== Winners and nominees ==
Nominees and winners are as listed below.

List of winners and nominees for the 8th ceremony of African Muzik Magazine Awards
Song Of The Year	Best Collaboration
Wizkid (featuring Tems and Justin Bieber) – "Essence (Remix)"; Focalistic and Davido – "Ke Star (Remix)"; Ladipoe (featuring Buju) – "Feeling"; Calema (featuring Perola, Soraia Ramos and Manecas Costa) – "Kua Buaru"; DJ Tarico and Burna Boy – "Yaba Buluku"; Tayc – "Le Temps"; Naira Marley and Busiswa – "Coming"; Nviiri The Storyteller (featuring Bien) – "Niko Sawa"	Focalistic and Davido – "Ke Star (Remix)"; Dadju (featuring Tiskola) - "Dieu Merci"; Flavour (featuring Diamond Platnumz and Fally Ipupa) – "Berna"; DJ Tarico and Burna Boy – "Yaba Buluku"; Bella Shmurda and Zlatan – "Cash App"; Naira Marley and Busiswa – "Coming"; Diamond Platnumz (featuring Koffi Olomide) – "Waah"; Serge Ibaka and Tayc – "Leggo"
Best Male West Africa	Best Female West Africa
Adekunle Gold (Nigeria); KiDi (Ghana); Burna Boy (Nigeria); Davido (Nigeria); Wizkid (Nigeria); Rema (Nigeria); Wally Seck (Senegal); Sarkodie (Ghana)	Simi (Nigeria); Adina (Ghana); Tiwa Savage (Nigeria); Zeynab Habib (Benin); Yasmine (Guinea Bissau); Dior Mbaye (Senegal); MzVee (Ghana); Tems (Nigeria)
Best Newcomer	Artist of The Year
Ruger (Nigeria); Yaw Tog (Ghana); Black Sheriff (Ghana); Ayra Starr (Nigeria); Marioo (Tanzania); Kamo Mphela (South Africa); Nviiri The Storyteller (Kenya); Busta 929 (South Africa)	Wizkid (Nigeria); Burna Boy (Nigeria); Fally Ipupa (Congo); Diamond Platnumz (Tanzania); Aya Nakamura (Mali/France); ElGrande Toto (Morocco); Tayc (Cameroon); Dadju (Congo)
Best Male East Africa	Best Female East Africa
Diamond Platnumz (Tanzania); Eddy Kenzo (Uganda); Ali Kiba (Tanzania); The Ben (Rwanda); Khaligraph Jones (Kenya); Gildo Kassa (Ethiopia); Otile Brown (Kenya); Meddy (Rwanda)	Nandy (Tanzania); Nadia Mukami (Kenya); Vinka (Uganda); Zuchu (Tanzania); Sheebah Karungi (Uganda); Nikita Kering (Kenya); Tanasha Donna (Kenya); Knowless Butera (Rwanda)
Best Male Central Africa	Best Female Central Africa
Fally Ipupa (Congo); Gaz Mawete (Congo); Innoss'B (Congo); Tayc (Cameroon); Dadju (Congo); Salatiel (Cameroon); Calema (Sao Tome); Ko–C (Cameroon)	Mimie (Cameroon); Coco Argentée (Cameroon); Shan’L (Gabon); Daphne (Cameroon); Mayra Andrade (Cape Verde); Liloca (Mozambique); Soraia Ramos (Cape Verde); Blanche Bailly (Cameroon)
Best Male Southern Africa	Best Female Southern Africa
Focalistic (South Africa); Slapdee (Zambia); Cassper Nyovest (South Africa); Shimza (South Africa); Jah Prayzah (Zimbabwe); The Dogg (Namibia); Sjava (South Africa); Anselmo Ralph (Angola)	Elaine (South Africa); DBN Gogo (South Africa); Ammara Brown (Zimbabwe); Lady Du (South Africa); Shashl (Zimbabwe); Sally Boss Madam (Namibia); Gemma Griffiths (Zimbabwe); Edmazia (Angola)
Best African Group	Best Live Act
Sauti Sol (Kenya); Toofan (Togo); Calema (Sao Tome); Blaq Diamond (South Africa); Chelsy and Nsoki (Angola); Mi Casa (South Africa); B2C (Kampala Boys) (Uganda); The Cavemen (Nigeria)	Fally Ipupa (Congo); Flavour (Nigeria); Sauti Sol (Kenya); Stonebwoy (Ghana); Yemi Alade (Nigeria); Burna Boy (Nigeria); Diamond Platnumz (Tanzania); Focalistic (South Africa)
Crossing Boundaries With Music Award	Best Gospel
Wizkid (Nigeria); Burna Boy (Nigeria); Aya Nakamura (Mali/France); Dave (Nigeria/UK); Headie One (Ghana/UK); S.Pri Noir (Guinea Bissau/France); Tems (Nigeria); Dadju (Congo)	Mercy Chinwo (Nigeria); Joe Mettle (Ghana); Miguel Buila (Angola); Icha Kavons (Congo); Diana Hamilton (Ghana); DJ Kerozen (Ivory Coast); Tim Godfrey (Nigeria); Sinach (Nigeria)
Best Male North Africa	Best Female North Africa
ElGrande Toto (Morocco); Balti (Tunisia); Hamaki (Egypt); Saad Lamjarred (Morocco); Soolking (Algeria); Mouh Milano (Algeria); Akram Hosny (Egypt)	Ruby (Egypt); Souhila Ben Lachhab (Algeria); Emel (Tunisia); Marwa Loud (Morocco); Sandy (Egypt); Latifa (Tunisia); Najoua Belyzel (Morocco); Asma Lamnawar (Morocco)
Best Male Rapper	Best Female Rapper
Olamide (Nigeria); Sarkodie (Ghana); Moobers (Angola); Nasty C (South Africa); Khaligraph Jones (Kenya); Fik Fameica (Uganda); Phyno (Nigeria); Yanga Chief (South Africa)	Bomb$hell Grenade (Zambia); Nadia Nakai (South Africa); Sampa the Great (Zambia); Rosa Ree (Tanzania); Askia – Cameroon; Eno Barony (Ghana); Muthoni Drummer Queen (Kenya); Ms Banks (Nigeria)
Best Video Director	Best DJ Africa
Director Kenny (Tanzania); Dr Nkeng Stephens (Cameroon); Deska Torres (Kenya); TG Omori (Nigeria); David Duncan (Ghana); Sasha Vybz (Uganda); Dammy Twitch (Nigeria); Ofentse Mwase (South Africa)	DJ Big N (Nigeria); DJ Spinall (Nigeria); DJ Zinhle (South Africa); DJ Dollar (Senegal); DJ Soupamodel (Nigeria); Major League DJz (South Africa); DJ Kess (Ghana); DJ Moh Spice (Kenya)
Best African DJ USA	AFRIMMA Video of the Year
DJ Tunez (Nigeria); DJ Ecool (Nigeria); DJ Shinski (Kenya); Dj Buka (Nigeria); DJ Moh (Ivory Coast); DJ Akua (Ghana); DJ K Meta (Ethiopia); DJ Oreo (Nigeria)	Flavour (featuring Diamond Platnumz and Fally Ipupa) – "Berna"; Tayc – "Le Temps"; Teni – "Hustle"; MzVee – "Baddest Boss"; Zuchu – "Sukari"; Rayvanny and Innoss'B – "Kelebe"; Rema – "Bounce"; Wizkid (featuring Tems) – "Essence"
Music Producer of the Year	Best African Dancer
P. Priime (Nigeria); Kimamba (Tanzania); S2Kizzy (Tanzania); Salatiel (Cameroon); London (Nigeria); Mr JazziQ (South Africa); Richie Mensah (Ghana); DJ Maphorisa (South Africa)	Soweto’s Finest (South Africa); Poco Lee (Nigeria); Henry Le Sheriff (Cameroon); La Petite Zota (Ivory Coast); Masaka Kids Africana (Uganda); Sayrah Chips (Nigeria); Angel Nyigu (Tanzania); Incredible Zigi (Ghana)
Best Lusophone	Best Francophone
Calema (Sao Tome); Matias Damasio (Angola); Nelson Freitas (Cape Verde); Anselmo Ralph (Angola); Mayra Andrade (Cape Verde); C4 Pedro (Angola); Prodigio (Angola); Paulo Flores (Angola)	Toofan (Togo); Dadju (Congo); Wally B. Seck (Senegal); Tayc (Cameroon); Innoss'B (Congo); Aya Nakamura (Mali/France); Tenor (Cameroon); Gaz Mawete (RDC)
Personality of the Year
Boity Thulo (South Africa); Ebuka Obi-Uchendu (Nigeria); Do2tun (Nigeria); Serwa Amihere (Ghana); Konnie Toure (Ivory Coast); Afonso Quintas (Angola); James Onen (Uganda); Jamal Gaddafi (Kenya)
