= Kwacha Music Awards =

Annual music industry award ceremony

- Current: Kwacha Music Awards 2023
- Awarded for: Outstanding achievements in the media industry
- Country: Zambia
- First award: September 11, 2017; 9 years ago
- Final award: 2023

Kwacha Music Awards are Zambian music awards established in 2017 by Sun FM Zambia. The awards were established to encourage and promote the originality and the excellence in Zambian music industry for the radio airplay through recognizing, honoring, and appreciating the deserving artists.

The awards are registered with the National Arts Council of Zambia and PACRA for the copyright protection.

== History ==
The first Kwacha Music Awards ceremony was held in Lusaka at Mulungushi International Conference Centre on 30 September, 2017.

The National Arts Council of Zambia is mandated by National Arts Council Act 31 of 1994 Part 5, Section (e) to “regulate and provide for modalities for the award of national honours for artistic merit".

The awards are hosted in the capital city of Zambia, Lusaka. They are one of the major local Zambia's awards. As similar with most of the awards in Zambia, the awards categories are split into male and female.

The awards also recognize humanitarians who are helping the needy in communities. The votes by the public and organisations are cast via their website in Zambia as well as across the African continent.

=== Nomination and criteria ===
The nominees of the awards are drawn from the fan interactions that are reflected on the radio airplay in countrywide. The votes are tracked by the committee of the awards with partnership to various radio stations. The awards are then determined by the polls of the public and the fans via established channels that include website, SMS, and social media. The awards are then verified by the auditing firms for transparency.

== Artist of the Year ==
The Artist of the Year category is one of the highest and most prestigious of the awards given at the event given to the artist(s). The artist winning most of the awards is Yo Maps.

== List of ceremonies ==
=== 2023 winners ===
Kwacha Award winners were announced in December 2023.

=== General award categories ===
Award	Winner	Work	Ref
Album of the Year	Yo Maps	Try Again	
Song of the Year	Yo Maps	Try Again	
Best Male Artist	Yo Maps	Himself	
Best Female Artist	Towela Kaira	Herself	
Best Hip Hop/Rap Song	Chef 187	Ba Yubu	
Best Collaboration	Slap Dee Ft Casper Nyovest and Xain	African Queen	

=== Other awards categories ===
Award	Ref
– Best International Achievement: Sampa The Great – Best Artist of the Copperbelt: Chile One – Best Artist of Lusaka: Dizmo – Best Artist of Northwestern Province: Cox – Best Artist of Western Province: Mumble Jumble – Best Artist of Southern Province: King Illest – Best Artist of Northern Province: Muzo AKA Alphonso – Best Artist of Muchinga Province: Happy K – Best Artist of Luapula Province: Nack Unity – Best Artist of Central Province: Brokenhill Emmy – Best of Eastern Province: Chile 84 – Best Reggae or Dancehall Song Award: “Bless Me” by T-Sean – Best RnB Fusion Song Award: “Nobody” by Chef 187 – Best Dual or Group of the Year: Chanda na Kay – Best Gospel Album of the Year: “Pole Pole” by Pompi – Best Gospel Song Male of the Year: “Shamboko” by Pompi – Best Gospel Song by Female of the Year “Ukulambalala” (Remix) by Deborah Ngama – Best Choir of the Year: Defence and Security Choir – Best Indigenous Sound of the Year: “Calendar” by Afunika – Most Conscious Song Award: “Try Again” by Yo Maps ft. Abel Chungu Musuka – Humanitarian : Macky 2 – Best Newcomer of the Year: Terry The Vocalist – Special Recognition of the Year: Stanbic Bank	

== Current award categories ==
=== Music ===
- Best Hip-Hop Song
- Best R&B Song
- Best Mainstream (Pop)
- Most Conscious Song
- Best Gospel Song (Male)
- Gospel Album Of The Year
- Best Male Artist
- Best Female Artist
- Humanitarian Award
- Best Gospel Song (Female)
- Best Collaboration
- Best Duo/Group
- Best Band
- Best Choir Group
- Album Of The Year
- Song of The Year
- Best Newcomer (Male)
- Best Newcomer (Female)
- Best Sound Production
- Best Dance Hall Song
- Best International Achievement Award
- Lifetime Achievement Award

== Provincial Awards ==
- Copperbelt Province
- Lusaka Province
- Central Province
- Eastern Province
- Luapula Province
- Muchinga Province
- Northern-Western Province
- Northern Province
- Western Province
- Southern Province

== Host Cities ==
Year	Date	Venue	Country	Host city
2017	September 28	Mulungushi Conference Centre	Zambia	Lusaka
2021	_	_	Zambia	Lusaka
2022	_	_	Zambia	Lusaka
2023	_	_	Zambia	Lusaka

== See also ==
- Zikomo Awards
