= Afunika =

Zambian musician

- Born: Frank Chirwa; July 31, 1985 (age 40); Chingola, Zambia
- Other name: • The Eye Of An Eagle
- Occupations: Musician; Songwriter; Producer
- Spouse: Elizabeth Mubanga (m. 2021)
- Musical career
- Genres: Kalindula; Zam-Rock; R&B
- Instrument: Vocals
- Years active: 2008–present
- Labels: Danger Zone; Bravo Records

Frank Chirwa (born July 31, 1985), better known by his stage name Afunika, is a Zambian singer, songwriter and music producer.

== Early life and music style ==
Chirwa was born on July 31, 1985, in Chingola of the Copperbelt Province of Zambia.

He has, in most interviews, cited P.K. Chishala and Paul Ngozi as the people that influence his musical style and sound.

== Personal life ==
In 2021, Chirwa married Elizabeth Mubanga.

== Discography ==
=== Studio albums ===
List of studio albums with selected details
Title	Details
Malinso	Formats: CD
Wounded Buffalo	Formats: CD
Chimusebo	Released: 2015; Formats: CD
Isumbu	Released: 2016; Formats: Digital download
Nakulalolela	Released: 2019; Formats: CD • Digital download

=== Singles ===
Title	Year	Album
"Darling"		
"Mami" (feat. Macky 2)	2010	
"Hold Me"		
"Ichiselema"		
"Easy Goer"		
"Kakonkote"		
"Wounded Buffalo"		Wounded Buffalo
"Kayonawileni"		
"Ichimusebo" (feat. J.K)	2015	
"Example"		
"Umwaume Wakulela" (feat. Slapdee)	2016	
"Nakulalolela"	2019	Nakulalolela
"Piki Piki Skirt"	2019	Nakulalolela
"Currency" (feat. Macky 2)	2019	Nakulalolela
"My Past"		

== Awards and nominations ==
Year	Award	Category	Nominee/Work	Result	Ref.
2015	Zambia Music Awards	Best Collaboration	'Kumalila Ngoma'	Won	
2017	Kwacha Music Awards	Best Mainstream Pop	'Pama Order'	Nominated	
2017	Kwacha Music Awards	Best Collaboration	'Umwaume Wakulela'	Won	
2017	Kwacha Music Awards	Best Male Artist	Afunika	Nominated	
2017	Kwacha Music Awards	Provincial: Copperbelt Province	Afunika	Nominated	
