= Wezi =

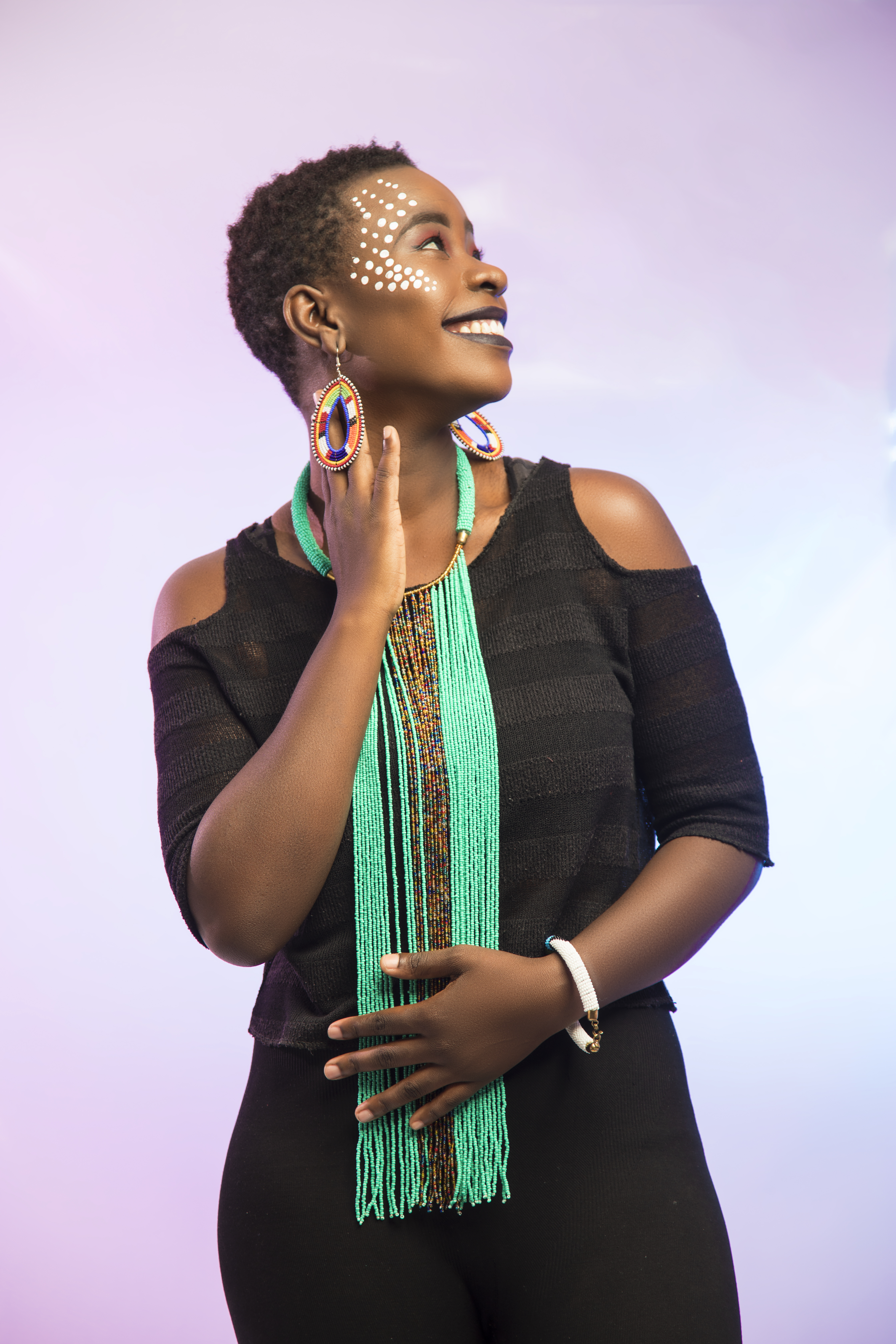

Background information
- Also known as: Wezi HeartSound
- Born: Victoria Wezi Mhone; 25 May 1992 (age 33); Ndola, Zambia
- Origin: Ndola, Zambia
- Genres: Afro-pop; Neo soul; afro-soul; pop; jazz
- Occupations: Singer-songwriter; performer
- Instruments: Vocals; Guitar
- Years active: 2013–present
- Labels: Elation Entertainment; Bizzy Baila International; MOJO Music

Victoria Wezi Mhone (born 25 May 1992), known in music circles as Wezi or Wezi HeartSound, is a Zambian singer and songwriter. She rose to fame in 2016 after releasing her debut EP Uhai which won her the 2016 new artist of the year at the Zambia Music Awards.

== Early life ==
Wezi is the second born daughter in a family of four from her parents pastor Royce Chanje and the late Apostle Simon Mhone. She was raised by her uncle, her mother's elder brother, on the Copperbelt in the Ndola District, Zambia. Wezi started singing at the age of seven and was encouraged by her parents. She started writing poems and songs at the age of 11. She received her primary education at North Rise basic school where she was the president of the CHONGOLOLO CLUB and the leader of the scripture Union with Zambian singer T Low and Namibia-based youth leader Joseph Kalimbwe who attended the same school in Ndola. Wezi later attended and completed high school at a Dominican convent secondary school where she was an active member of the drama club, keep fit club & the president of Young Christian Students (YCS). In 2013, she was enrolled into the school of humanities and social sciences at the University of Zambia.

== Music career ==
Wezi officially signed her first record deal in 2013 with Bizzy Baila International which was co owned by T-Sean and Tbwoy-Tbizzy.Under the record label, she released 3 singles Ambuya, Nipulumuseni and Tichitenji which was produced by T-Sean. She opted out of her contract in 2014 and later signed on to Vibrant Media where she recorded several songs with none being released. Shortly after her deal with Vibrant Media, she joined MOJO Music where she was only able to release one song after several recordings. In 2016 she released her first EP Uhia as an independent artist which won her the award for the best new artist at the 2016 Zambia Music Awards. In 2017, she was nominated for the Kora Awards. In 2018 she signed on to Elation Entertainment, a Zambian-based record label. Wezi took part in the annual Stanbic bank music festival in Zambia in 2016, 2017 and 2018 where she performed alongside Boyz II Men, UB40, Joe Thomas and Brian McKnight. In March 2018 she performed at the Lake of Stars Festival held in London and Glasgow as a headline act alongside the likes of Frightened Rabbits, M.anifest, and Faith Mussa. She later performed at the Harare International Festival of the Arts in Zimbabwe held between the 1st and 6th of May. In April 2020 Wezi released a cover song called "Take My Heart" produced by Bravo and released another hit called "Ise Bantu Tyala" featuring Pilato.

=== Grammy Awards ===
Wezi was nominated for the Grammy Awards after featuring on Etana's album Pamona in 2021.

=== Fifa Women World Cup ===
With the Zambia women's national football team qualifying for the FIFA World Cup for the first time in their history, Wezi, Towela and Xaven The Kopala Queen were made the official music ambassadors for the national team and released the official team song Copper Queens Anthem.

== Humanitarian work ==
In 2016, she attended the African Union summit and later in the same year was appointed by the late Minister of Gender as an ambassador on the campaigns against early child marriages & gender-based violence. Wezi served as an advocate for conservation of natural water sources after taking part in the 2017 World Wide Fund for Nature Journey of Water.

== Discography ==
=== Albums ===
Uhai (EP, 2016)

=== Singles ===
- "Ambuya"
- "Tichitenji"
- "Nipulumuseni"
- "Nthenda" (featuring Jay Rox)
- "Maplanga na nsimbi"
- "Translate"
- "Nyimbo Zako"
- "Umung'O" (featuring Mumba Yachi)
- "Anagaila" (with Kantu & Bombshell)
- "Tiwepo"
- "Nikukonda"
- "Munanitema" (featuring Cleo Ice Queen)
- Ise Bantu Tyala (featuring Pilato)
- Take heart my heart
- Moyo
