= Cassie Kabwita =

Zambian actor and film director

- Born: Sharon Kabwita; 13 October 1988 (age 37); Ndola, Zambia
- Education: Speciss College
- Occupations: Actress, Film Producer
- Years active: 2009–present
- Known for: Filmmaking
- Notable work: Guilt (2013), Kwacha, Sink or Swim (The Perilous Journey)
- Television: Love Games, Ripoti
- Awards: 2017 ZAFTA Awards; 2019 Ngoma Awards; 2020 Africa Magic Viewers' Choice Awards

Cassie Kabwita (born 13 October 1988) is a Zambian actress and film producer and rotarian. She is known for her works in the Zambian and Tanzanian film industries. Cassie is the Ambassador for The African Film Festival (TAFF) in Dallas

== Early life and education ==
Cassie is a Lunda descent from Chief Kakoma in Mwinilunga District located in North Western Province and was born at the Ndola Central Hospital, in Ndola, Copperbelt Province in Zambia.

Kabwita attended Buteko Basic School and was the head girl at Luanshya Girls High School. She studied hospitality business at Speciss College at the Herbert Chitepo campus in Harare, Zimbabwe, and graduated in 2009.

== Career ==
Cassie begun her acting career in 2006 in theatre arts, but made her film debut in 2009, where she played minor roles in Tanzanian horror film, Roho Sita and was the lead actor and producer for Sweet Revenge. In 2010 she was cast in the movie Familia Yangu, where she plays two roles, one as a mother to two children and the second as an old lady looking for a job as a maid. Her breakthrough came in 2012 as an actress Zambian TV series Love Games.

In 2013 she made her debut behind the camera, as she produced and played the lead role in the movie Guilt. The Mwape Peer awards in New York, in the United States of America honored her with the best uprising star award in 2015 for her contributions to Zambian cinema making her the first actress to receive the award.

In 2017, she produced her second film Sound of Silence, with Jessie Chisi to raise awareness on sexual and gender based violence and featured Tanzanian and Zambian actors. She was also appointed as the country manager for Miss Zambia in 2017

On 1 April 2018 Kabwita was honored to grace the first ever Sinema Zetu International Film Festival award night with Tanzania's 4th president Jakaye Mrisho Kikwete, Wema Sepetu and Diamond Platnumz to present the award for best actress.

== Filmography ==
=== Director / writer / producer ===
Year	Title	Writer	Producer
2010	3rd party	Yes	Yes
2014	Guilt / Hatia	Yes	Yes
2017	Kwacha / Imetosha	Yes	Yes

=== Actress ===
Film roles
Year	Title	Role	Note
2009	Roho Sita	Minor	Directed by Ommy-D
2009	Sweet Revenge	MInor Role, Director	Produced By Nasir Muhammed Directed By Ommy-D
2010	Familia Yangu	Lead Role/Producer	Produced By Poyaga Production Directed By Goodluck Komba
2013	Guilt / Hatia	Lead Actress	
2013	Vita Baridi	Lead Role	Produced By Jerusalem Films Production Directed By Jacob Steven
2014	Mzee wa Swagga	Lead Role	Produced By Jerusalem Films Directed By Jacob Stevens
2015	Sink or Swim: The Perilous Journey	Support Role	Produced By Prince Richard Directed By Ike Nnewogbi
2015	Secrets Untold	Lead Role	Produced And Directed By Owas Ray Mwape
2018	Fugitive	Support	Produced By Diamond Image Directed By Andy Boyo
2019	Off Duty		
	3rd Party	Lead Role, Film producer, Screenwriter	Directed By Okechukwu Oku
	His Queen	Support	Directed By Charles Uwagbi
2020	Kavundula	Lead Role, Film producer, Screenwriter	Directed By Thandi Vundamina

TV Shows
Year	Title	Role	Notes
2023	Repoti Season 1 & 4	Lead	Produced By Jerusalem Films For Sinema Zetu On Azam TV Directed By Jacob Stevens
2021	Uncle Limbani Season 2 & 3	Support	Produced By New Norm Media For Zambezi Magic On DSTv Directed By Jordan Muyembi Nominated for Best Original Comedy Series at 2023 AMVCA
2020	Mungoma Season 1 & 2	Support	Produced By Upfront Media For Zambezi Magic On Dstv Directed By Maynard Muchangwe
2018	Side Plate Season 1 & 2	Support	Produced By Mingeli Palata Directed By Maynard Muchangwe
2012	Love Games Season 1 and Season 2	Lead Role	Produced By Media 365 For USAID Directed By Jeff Sitali

Music video appearances
Year	Song	Musician	Video on YouTube
2011	"Njiwa"	Mangustino	
2014	"Shalapo"	B'Flow	
2015	"WANGA Wanga"	Bryan	
2015	"Basazibe"	Mampi	
2018	"Everything is better"	Macky 2 feat. Exile	

== Awards and nominations ==
Year	Award	Category	Result
2014	ZAFTA Awards	Best Feature Film	Won
2014	ZAFTA Awards	Best Editor	Won
2014	ZAFTA Awards	Best Sound	Won
2014	ZAFTA Awards	Best Actress	Nominated
2014	ZAFTA Awards	Best Picture	Won
2015	ZAFTA Award	Best Actress	Won
2015	Mwape Pee Award	Best Uprising Star	Won
2016	Zee Music Awards	Best Actress	Won
2017	Zambian Woman Awards	Zambian Woman of the Year in Film	Nominated
2017	Multichoice ZAFTA Awards	Best Picture	Nominated
2017	Multichoice ZAFTA Awards	Best Actress	Won
2017	Multichoice ZAFTA Awards	Best Film	Nominated
2017	Zee Music Awards	Best Actress	Won
2018	The National Assassination of Media Arts (NAMA)	Most Consistent Actress	Won
2018	The National Assassination of Media Arts (NAMA)	Most Outstanding Film Producer	Won
2019	Shungu Namutitima International Film Festival	Best Zambian Picture	Won
2019	Sinema Zetu International Film Festival - Dar-Es-Salaam Tanzania	World Cinema (Kwacha)	Nominee
2019	Ngoma Awards – Lusaka Zambia	Most Outstanding Feature Film (Kwacha)	Winner
2019	Ngoma Awards – Lusaka Zambia	Best Actress (Kwacha)	Nominee
2019	Sotambe International Film Festival - Kitwe Zambia	Best Film (Kwacha)	Winner
2020	2020 African Magic Viewers' Choice Awards	Best Movie South African (Kwacha)	Nominee
2020	The African Film Festival	Best Short Film Southern Africa	Nominee
2020	The African Film Festival	Best Actress In A Movie	Nominee
