= Jerry Fingaz =

Zambian music producer

Jericho Banda, popularly known as Jerry Fingers or Jerry Fingaz is a Zambian music producer and songwriter. In 2015, he won a Zambia National Awards as the best studio sound producer of the year. In 2013, he was nominated in the category Best Bass Guitarist in the Zambian Music Awards.

== Background ==
=== Early life and career ===
Banda started his career as a keyboardist at a local church he attended. When he was in high school, he took a part-time job as the sound engineer at Cypher in Lusaka, one of the first modern studios in the country.
