= KB Killa Beats =

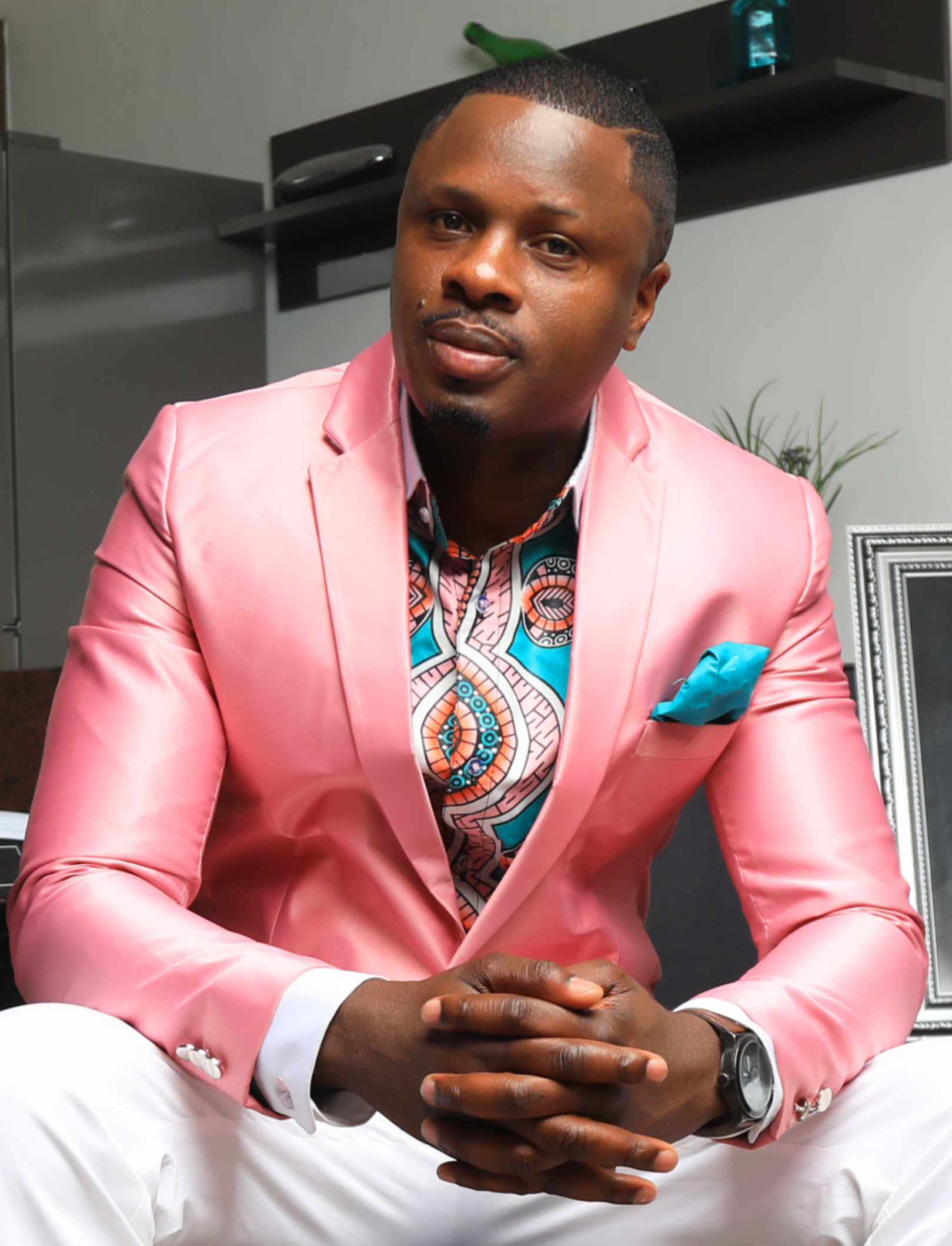
- KB in 2018
- Born: Yahya Kaba; 20 June 1983 (age 43); Lusaka
- Other names: Killa Beats; KB
- Occupations: Record producer; Songwriter
- Years active: 2004–present
- Musical career
- Genres: Hip hop; R&B
- Instruments: Vocals; Piano
- Label: K-Amy Studio

Yahya Kaba (born June 20, 1983), known professionally as Killa Beats or just KB, is a Zambian hip hop record producer and songwriter. KB is also the chief executive officer (CEO) of his own label imprint, K-Amy Studio. His music career started in 2004 but his full recognition came in 2009 after the song Doubting for the singer Judy which featured P Jay. KB is also best known for his role as one of the judges on the MTN Music Scorer and Dreams Zambia. He was once co-host for Muvi TV's The Breakfast Show and was once a radio presenter for Rock FM. He was also the National Treasurer for the Zambia Association of Musicians.

== Life and career ==
=== 2004–2010: Early life and career beginnings ===
Yahya Kaba was born and raised in Lusaka to parents originally from Guinea. KB started his music career as a rapper in the 1990s, however his interest was switched to radio after he completed his grade school. He used to visit Digital X studios where his music interest grew. KB started off as a Radio Presenter at Choice FM in 2004 and the following year he moved to QFM Radio until 2012.

=== 2009–present: K-Army and professional career ===
In 2009 KB produced Judy's Supernatural Woman then produced Alpha Romeo's President album. In 2010 he produced Double Trouble Album that featured the late P Jay and B’flow. In 2013, KB produced the hit single "Cry of a Woman" for B’flow, "Kazizi ni Kazizi for Tyce. In 2015 he Produced his first album titled My Diary, a compilation of songs from different artists. On 17 October 2018, his album Thankful was released.

== Discography ==
- My Diary (2015)
- Thankful (2018)

== Awards and nominations ==
List of awards and nominations
Year	Award	Category	Result
2006	Q Fm Zambia Awards	Best DJ	Won
2014	Zambia Music Awards	Best producer	Nominated
2016	Zambia Music Awards	Best producer	Nominated
2017	Kwacha Music Awards	Best producer	Nominated
2018	Kwacha Music Awards	Best producer	Nominated
