= Zambia Music Awards =

Awards event in Zambia

- Current: 2024 Zambia Music Awards
- Awarded for: Outstanding work in the Zambian music industry
- Country: Zambia
- Presented by: Zambia
- First award: 2013; 13 years ago

The Zambia Music Awards (ZMAs) are an annual Zambian national music awards that stands as a hallmark event within Zambia's music industry that recognizes and celebrates outstanding achievements in the Zambian music industry. The ZMA's mission, which seeks to recognize and honor great work in Zambia's musical field, focuses on the development of ideas that promote progression and originality. Consequently, the objective of ZMAs is to create a reliable and prestigious awards platform for all Zambian musicians as well as producers because they are part and parcel of this industry.

== History ==
=== Origin ===
The National Arts Council of Zambia and the stakeholders in the Zambian music industry created the awards in the year 2013. They were meant to foster talent, excellence, and creativity in the music industry of Zambia. These awards are run by the National Arts Council of Zambia with sponsorship from various judges and stakeholders across the industry. The National Arts Council of Zambia organizes the awards, which boasts a team of industry professionals, judges, and sponsors. As performers, presenters, and winners, the awards ceremony has had many prominent Zambian musicians, producers, and music industry experts take part in the ceremony.

=== Nomination and criteria ===
The nominees of the awards are drawn from the fan interactions that are reflected on the radio airplay in countrywide and the votes are tracked by the committee of the awards with partnership to various radio stations. The awards are then determined by the polls of the public and the fans via established channels that include websites, SMS, and social media. The awards are then verified by the auditing firms for transparency.

== Objectives ==
The ZMAs goals involve giving awards for excellent work, supporting Zambian music nationally and internationally, inspiring creative minds, giving space for networking as well as collaborations and finally contributing to growth as well as development in Zambia’s music sector.

== Artist of the year ==
The Artist of the Year category is one of the highest and most prestigious of the awards given at the event given to the artist(s). The artist winning most of the awards is Yo Maps.

== Current award categories ==
=== Music ===
- Song of the Year
- Best Hip-Hop Act
- Artist of the Year (Female)
- Artist of the Year (Male)
- Music Video of the Year
- Best Gospel Artist
- Best New Artist (Female)
- Best New Artist (Male)
- Best Dancehall Act
- Album of the Year
- Producer of the Year
- Best Duo/Group
- Lifetime Achievement

=== Media ===
- Best Radio DJ/Personality
- Best Entertainment writer
- Best TV personality
- Media Legend

=== Fashion ===
- Most Fashionable Celebrity
- Model of the Year
- Living Legend
- Fashion Icon
- Designer of the Year

== Host Cities ==
Year	Country	Host city	Venue	Host(s)
2017	Zambia	Lusaka		
2018	Zambia			
2019	Zambia	Lusaka		

== Recipients ==
List of selected recipients and years:

Category	Nominee / work (and year)	Result	Reference
Best Hip Hop Album	Slap Dee (2015)	Won	
Best Female Newcomer	Wezi (2015)	Won	
Best Traditional Artist	Petersen Zagaze (2015)	Won	
Best Producer	Wilz (2014) T Low (2017)	Won	
Best Dancehall Artist	Roberto (2014) Roberto (2017)	Won	
Best Hip Hop Artist	Macky 2 (2014) Macky 2 (2017)	Won	
Best Newcomer	Izrael (2013) F Jay (2016)	Won	
Best Male Artist	B Flow (2013) B Flow (2016)	Won	
Best Female Artist	Mampi (2013) Mampi (2016)	Won	

== List of ceremonies and its winners ==
=== 2013 ===
- Mampi - Best Female Artist
- B Flow - Best Male Artist
- Izrael - Best Newcomer

=== 2014 ===
- Macky 2 - Best Hip Hop Artist
- Roberto - Best Dancehall Artist
- Wilz - Best Producer

=== 2015 ===
The 2015 Zambian Music Awards were held at Government Complex in Zambia's capital (Lusaka) on Saturday, 11 April. The night’s big winner was Chef 187 with four awards: Best Mainstream Male Artist; Best Collaboration (‘Kumalila Ngoma’ with Afunika); Best Hip-Hop Album; as well as Best Mainstream Album titled Heart of a Lion. The hosts were Gesh Groove and Kutemba. Abel Chungu Musuka won three prizes as he received the Best Gospel Male Artist, Best RnB Album, and Best Gospel Album awards for Love Unleashed. Expressing his joy after the event, Chef 187 wrote on his Facebook page, “It was awesome yesterday; I appreciate those who support my music activities. I really worked hard towards putting up the ‘Heart of a Lion’ music project, and I am excited to see everything going as planned. However, this success has only been possible because there are those didn’t only believe in my dream but also gave their full support.”

The winners of Zambia’s 2015 Music Awards were:

- Best Club DJ: Bizzy Wizzy
- Best Female Radio DJ: Roxy (Radio Phoenix)
- Best Male Radio DJ: Man Chilu (ZNBC)
- Best Collaboration: 'Kumalila Ngoma' – Chef 187 & Afunika
- Best Choral Album: Pa Lupili – Mt. Sinai
- Best Kalindula Album: Ndevu – Liseli Sisters
- Best Dance-Hall Album: Time Bomb – T Sean
- Best Reggae Album: Freedom – Chris Aka
- Best RnB Album: Love Unleashed – Abel Chungu Musuka
- Best Hip-Hop Album: Heart of a Lion – Chef 187
- Best Mainstream Album: Heart of a Lion – Chef 187
- Best Gospel Album: Love Unleashed – Abel Chungu Musuka
- Best Niyatu Album: Mr. Nyopole – Willz
- Best Song Writer: P Jay (Brian Chengwa)
- Best Jazz Album: Moments Of Truth – Afro Red
- Best Live Recording Album: Muli Yesu – North Mid Mega Choir
- Best Band: Amayenge Cultural Ensemble
- Best Gospel Female Artist: Suwilanji
- Best Gospel Male Artist: Abel Chungu Musuka
- Best New Artist: Willz Mr. Nyopole
- Best Traditional Music Album: Malizu – Tasila Mwale
- Best Indigenous Group: Kasama Arts Troupe
- Best Sound Engineer: Brian Michelo
- Best Drummer: Eston Mwape
- Best Studio Sound Producer: Jerry Fingaz
- Lifetime Achievement Award: Evelyn Hone College
- Best Mainstream Female Artist: Mampi
- Best Mainstream Male Artist: Chef 187
- Song Of the Year 2015: 'Mama Rebecca' – Macky2

=== 2016 ===
The Mosi Lager Zambian Music Awards, which is the most awaited event in the Zambian music industry, was held on April 30 in Livingstone and for the first time it was done jointly with the Mosi Day of Thunder music festival. A mixture of these two events aimed at reaching out to more people while at the same time recognizing and promoting Zambian music, arts as well as culture so as it can be appreciated internationally. In this way we sought to reach out to a bigger audience while recognizing and appreciating Zambian music, arts and culture on the international scene. The awards served as a platform for acknowledging great talents in various genres such as hip-hop or Kalindula, thereby creating an opportunity for these individuals to come forward with their talent before massive crowds gathered in different places throughout our country where they were recognised as the best performers, producers or artists from Zambia. At the launch event, Permanent Secretary Stephen Mwansa emphasized the importance of collaboration and partnership in the music industry, highlighting the awards' role in bringing together the public and private sectors. He noted that the Mosi Lager Zambian Music Awards and the Mosi Day of Thunder embodied the Zambian experience, celebrating heritage and shaping the future.

Zambian Breweries Marketing Director Thomas Kamphuis stressed the significance of music in society, citing its ability to penetrate various aspects of life, including rest, entertainment, education, and worship. He emphasized the importance of championing local talent and celebrated the power of music to bring people together. The awards were a joint effort between Zambian Breweries, the National Arts Council of Zambia, the Zambia Adjudicators Panel, and the Zambia Association of Musicians. The 2015's top winners, Chef 187 and Abel Chungu, took home seven trophies between them, setting the stage for another exciting celebration of Zambian music.Some winners were:

- Mampi - Best Female Artist
- B Flow - Best Male Artist
- F Jay - Best Newcomer

=== 2017 ===
- Macky 2 - Best Hip Hop Artist
- Roberto - Best Dancehall Artist
- T Low - Best Producer

=== 2018 ===
- Namwawa - Best Traditional Artist
- Wezi - Best Female Artist
- T Sean - Best Male Artist
- Yo Maps - Best Newcomer

=== 2019 ===
- Slap Dee - Best Hip Hop Album
- Mampi - Best Female Artist
- B Flow - Best Male Artist
- F Jay - Best Producer

=== 2020 ===
- Macky 2 - Best Hip Hop Artist
- Roberto - Best Dancehall Artist
- T Low - Best Male Newcomer
- Namwawa - Best Female Newcomer
- Wezi - Best Female Artist
- T Sean - Best Male Artist
- Yo Maps - Best Newcomer
- Slap Dee - Best Hip Hop Album

=== 2021 ===
- Mampi - Best Female Artist
- B Flow - Best Male Artist
- F Jay - Best Producer
- Macky 2 - Best Hip Hop Artist
- Roberto - Best Dancehall Artist
- T Low - Best Male Newcomer
- Namwawa - Best Female Newcomer
- Wezi - Best Female Artist
- T Sean - Best Male Artist
- Yo Maps - Best Newcomer
- Slap Dee - Best Hip Hop Album

=== 2022 ===
- Chef 187 - Best Hip Hop Artist
- Mampi - Best Female Artist
- B Flow - Best Male Artist
- F Jay - Best Producer
- Macky 2 - Best Hip Hop Artist
- Roberto - Best Dancehall Artist
- OCAZEY- Best Male Newcomer
