= Jerahyo =

Zambian music promoter

- Born: Robinson Muteba Kasao; 17 January 1986 (age 39); Zambia
- Occupation: Radio/Tv personality Artiste manager, Business consultant
- Musical career
- Genres: Hip hop; R&B; Zed Beats
- Years active: 2017- present

Robinson Muteba Kasao (17 January 1986) commonly known as Jerahyo, is a Zambian music promoter and radio personality. In 2022, he won the Zambian Music Promoter of the year award.

== Music career ==
Jerahyo first rose to fame in 2017 and went viral with the cartoon production of Zakado the Boxer and currently the co- executive producer of the Commercial Animation series Ama Jazzi which received presidential recognition twice from President Edgar Lungu. In 2021, he led the initiative to the first ever fill up of Woodlands stadium. In February 2021, he was appointed as promoter of Nexus Music, Zambia's largest music production company.

He manages Xaven The Kopala Queen and singing duo Chanda Na Kay.

== Personal life ==
Jerahyo lives on the Copperbelt.
