= WEZI =

WEZI may refer to:

- WEZI (FM), a radio station (102.9 FM) licensed to serve Jacksonville, Florida, United States
- WHJX, a radio station (106.5 FM) licensed to serve Ponte Vedra Beach, Florida, which held the call sign WEZI from 2015 to 2017
- WMFS (AM), a radio station (680 AM) licensed to serve Memphis, Tennessee, United States, which held the call sign WEZI from 1992 to 1993
- WOWW, a radio station (1430 AM) licensed to serve Germantown, Tennessee, which held the call sign WEZI in 1989
- WMLE, a radio station (94.1 FM) licensed to serve Germantown, Tennessee, which held the call sign WEZI from 1985 to 1989
- WHQT, a radio station (105.1 FM) licensed to serve Coral Gables, Florida, which held the call sign WEZI from 1983 to 1985
- WGKX, a radio station (105.9 FM) licensed to serve Memphis, Tennessee, United States, which held the call sign WEZI from 1973 to 1983

== See also ==
- Wezi (born 1992), Zambian singer and songwriter
