= Ngoma Awards =

Zambian award

The Ngoma Awards are an annual Zambian arts award ceremony which recognise the nation's artistic talent. The awards are organised by the National Arts Council of Zambia. The Ngoma Awards are Zambia's only official national artistic honours and awards, covering a wide range of disciplines.

== History ==
The National Arts Council of Zambia is mandated by the National Arts Council Act 31 of 1994 Part 5, Section (e) to “regulate and provide for modalities for the award of national honours for artistic merit.”

In 2019, the Ngoma Awards returned to Zambia after a six-year hiatus. The newly relaunched Ngoma Awards includes 7 categories: creative writing, stage theatre, community theatre, music, traditional music and dance, visual arts, and media arts. Guidelines and Procedures for the Ngoma Awards are provided in booklet and PDF form by the National Arts Council of Zambia.

== 2019 winners ==
Ngoma Award winners were announced in December 2019.

=== Music ===
Award	Winner	Also Nominated		
Most Outstanding Female Musician	Wezi	Bomb$hell Grenade; Esther Chungu Mubanga		
Martin Mulenga	Martin Mulenga; Ephraim Sekeleti; Chanda Brian	Most Outstanding Male Musician	Ephraim Sekeleti Mutalange	Roberto; T Sean ; Ocazey
Song of the Year	Finally by Yo Maps	African King by Wezi; Konkha by Mathew Tembo		
Album of the Year	Grateful by T Sean	Christ Revealed by Rachael Nanyangwe; Super Star by Roberto		
Most Outstanding Choir	New Apostolic Choir from Lusaka Central	St Margarets Choir from St Margarets Congregation – UCZ Kaunda Square; St Paul's Choir from St Paul's Congregation – UCZ Kabwata		
Most Outstanding Ban	Burning Youth	Afro Red; Sappers Band		
Most Outstanding Traditional Instrumentalist	Joseph Chibiya – Nsombo Malimba Dance Troupe	Derrick Lukona – Likumbi Lya Mize Dance Troupe; Teddy Tembo – Soli Cultural Dance Troupe		
Most Outstanding Male Dancer	Martin Kabwe – Amaombe Dance Troupe	Moses Kaumba – Likumbi Lya Mize Dance Troupe; Peter Tembo – Nomakanjani Dance Troupe		
Most Outstanding Female Dancer	Elina Zulu – Zambia National Service Dance Troupe	Mambo Mwinga – Zilile Dance Troupe; Munkana Moola – Likumbi Lya Mize Dance Troupe		
Most Outstanding Dance Troupe	Kamanga Dance Troupe	Tiyanjane Dance Troupe; Zambia National Service Dance Troupe		

=== Visual Arts ===
Award	Winner	Also Nominated
Most Outstanding 2-dimensional Artwork	Nyami Nyami by Isaac Kalambata	Culture vs Technology by Boyd Bishonga; Shades of Hue by Nukwase Tembo
Most Outstanding Male Visual Artist	Ngandwe Mwaba	George Mubanga; Poto Kabwe
Most Outstanding Female Visual Artist	Mulenga J. Mulenga	Alice Muyambo; Nukwase Tembo
Most Outstanding Artisan	Lawrence Lupiya	Boyd Bishonga; Lackson Mwape

=== Media Arts ===
Award	Winner	Also Nominated
Most Outstanding Feature Film	Kwacha by Cassie Kabwita	Mushala by Angel Phiri; Payback by Wyclif Mwamba
Most Outstanding Television Series	Mpali by Frank Sibuuku	Spoiler by Sidney Chisenga; Zuba by Fred Phiri
Most Outstanding Male Media Artist	Monde Mutale as Nguzu in Mpali	Leo Dauty Simukoko as Caesar in Payback; Owas Ray Mwape as Mwiche in Vindanda
Most Outstanding Female Media Artist	Anita Munamonga as Mwiza in Mpali	Cassie Kabwita as Kwacha in Kwacha; Grace Rumsey as Mwaka in Fever

=== Creative Writing ===
Award	Winner	Also Nominated
Most Outstanding Male Creative Writer	Henry Joe Sakala – Khomboni Private Investigator	Chishimba M. Lumbwe – Sundu; Gerry Sikazwe – Words That Matter
Most Outstanding Female Creative Writer	Maliya Mzyece Sililo – Despite the Bruises	Esnala Banda – Sketches of Paranoia; Sheeba Lishika – Woman
Most Outstanding Prose	Sundu by Chishimba M. Lumbwe	The Catalogue by Mweo Kondolo; Khomboni Private Investigator by Henry Joe Sakala
Most Outstanding Script	The Chosen One by Dr Cheela Chilala	The Baby by Lee Kabongo Senford; Shadow of Silence by Maggie Vivian Mbewe
Most Outstanding Poetry	Sketches of Paranoia by Esnala Banda	Woman by Sheeba Lishika; Words That Matter by Gerry Sikazwe

=== Theatre ===
Award	Winner	Also Nominated
Most Outstanding Stage Theatre Actress	Maureen Banda as Mwansa in The Throne	Barbara Mumpanga as Zoe in The Baby; Karen Ndhlovu Chulu as Luciana in Home Sweet Hell
Most Outstanding Stage Theatre Production	Banjo – Green Buffaloes	The Baby – Nkhwazi; The Chosen One – Napsa
Most Outstanding Comedian	Abel Chungu Musuka	Cheelo Mwanachingwala; Emmanuel Munsaka
Most Outstanding Community Theatre Production	Kakhonyonyo – Jere Ensemble Arts Acre	Children of the Dead – Mwazanji Dance Theatre; Umbili – Kanyama Theatre Production Unit
Most Outstanding Stage Theatre Director	Bizwell Mudenda for Banjo – Green Buffaloes	Hamalala Hamalala for The Chosen One – Napsa; Samuel Mubita Sikwa for The Baby – Nkhwazi
Most Outstanding Male Community Theatre Artist	Jacob Wachata – Chamwaza Performing Arts (Solwezi)	Daniel Ngoma – Tusole Theatre (Livingstone); Sylvester Kasapu – Tasiyana Community Theatre (Kabwe)
Most Outstanding Female Community Theatre Artist	Onolina Zulu – Twiza Mobile Theatre (Chipata)	Grace Mudenda – Mwazanji Community Dance Theatre (Lusaka); Theresa Kapasu – Tasiyana Community Theatre (Kabwe)

== See also ==
- Cinema of Zambia
- List of artists from Zambia
