= Chef 187 =

Zambian hip hop musician (born 1986)

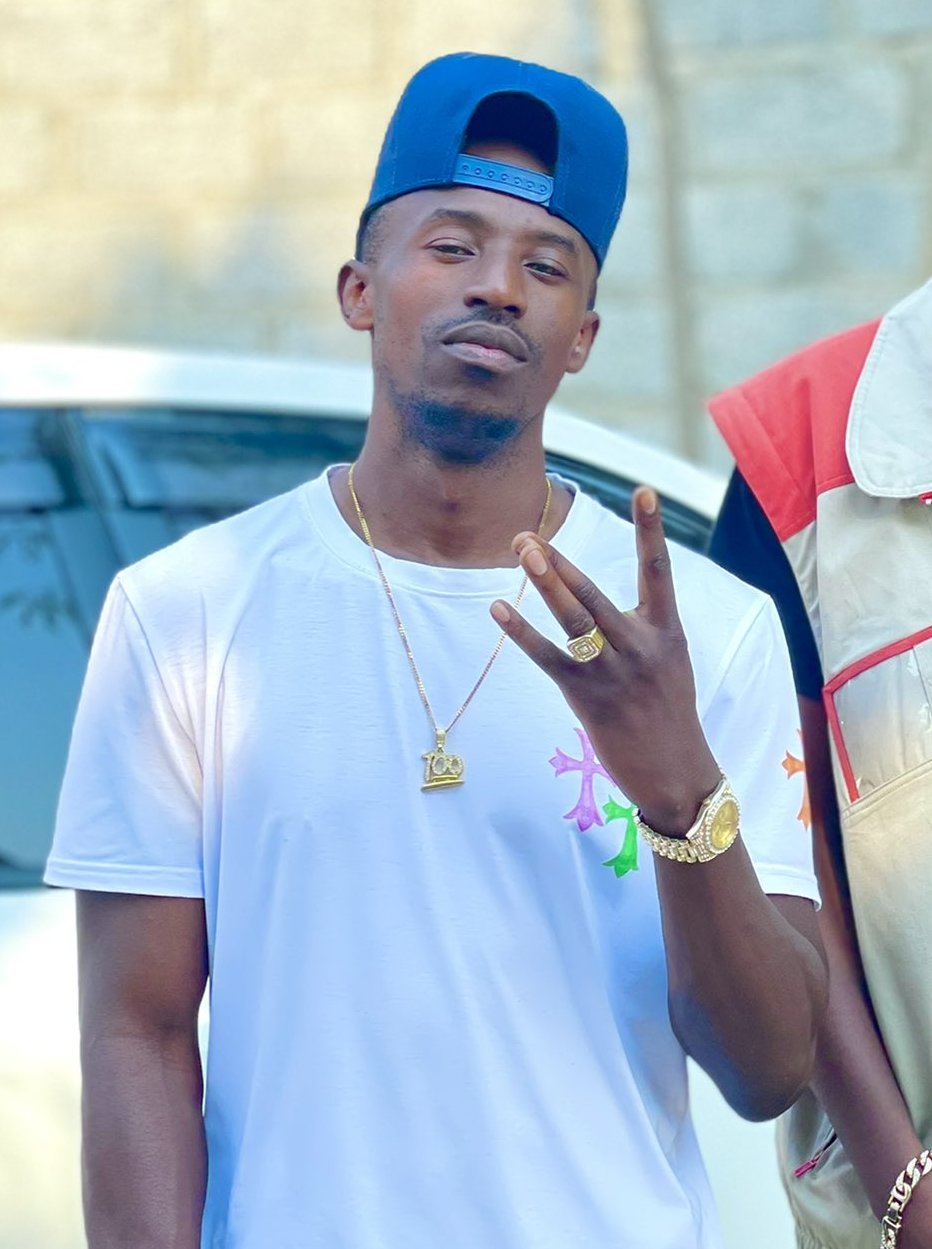
- Chef 187 in 2022
- Born: Kondwani Kaira; 23 May 1986 (age 40); Chingola, Zambia
- Other name: Numeral Uno • Lyrical Sensei
- Occupations: Musician; songwriter; rapper
- Spouse: Yolanda Kaira
- Relatives: Macky 2 (brother), Towela Kaira (sister)
- Musical career
- Genres: Hip hop; New Kalindula; R&B; Dunka; Zed Beats
- Years active: 2010–present
- Label: Alpha Entertainments

Kondwani Kaira (born May 23, 1986), known professionally as Chef 187, is a Zambian hip hop musician, a former Infinix ambassador and former Proflight ambassador from the Copperbelt Province signed under Alpha Entertainments Music. A younger brother to Macky 2.

== Career ==
Chef 187 first showed interest in music when he was 5 but he only considered it as a career in 2003 after seeing his elder brother Macky 2 become successful in the music industry over the years. In 2005 he recorded his first song. In 2011 he collaborated with Macky 2 his older brother, performing a diss track entitled "I Am Zambian Hip-Hop", targeted at rapper Slap Dee of XYZ entertainment records.

== Discography ==
=== Albums ===
- Bon Appetit - September 2019
- Bon Appetit Deluxe - Published: 02/2021
- Amnesia - December 2016
- Heart of a Lion - 2014
- Amenso Pamo- 2013
- Broke Nolunkumbwa - 2023

=== Notable songs ===
- "Wala" -2015
- "Kumalila Ngoma" - 2014
- "Foolish me feat P Jay"
- "Big Shofolo"
- "99 jobs"
- "Love you"
- "Court session"
- "Complicated" ft. T-Low Badman Alahji
- "Amnesia"
- "Good Teacher Bad Kasukulu"
- "Mundowe ndowe" ft. Mumba Yachi and Dope G
- "Winning feat Wilz Nyopole"
- "Can't Wait to Tell You I Told you" ft. S Roxy
- "Unbeatable" ft. SRoxy
- "Sensei"
- "No Minyo Minyo"
- "I need you"
- "Coordinate" ft Skales
- "One more" ft Mr. P
- "Never Forget (Sampa the Great song)"
- “ Nobody” ft Blake
- "Grammy Nechibemba" ft Drifta Trek

== Awards ==
- 2015 - Mainstream Album Award - Heart of a Lion
- 2015 - Best Hip Hop Album - Heart of a Lion
- 2015 - Best Mainstream Male Artiste award - Chef 187
- 2015 - Best Collaboration - "Kumalila Ngoma" (Chef 187 ft. Afunika)
- 2022- best hip-hop artist of year- kwacha awards(2022)
