= Towela =

Zambian singer, songwriter and performer

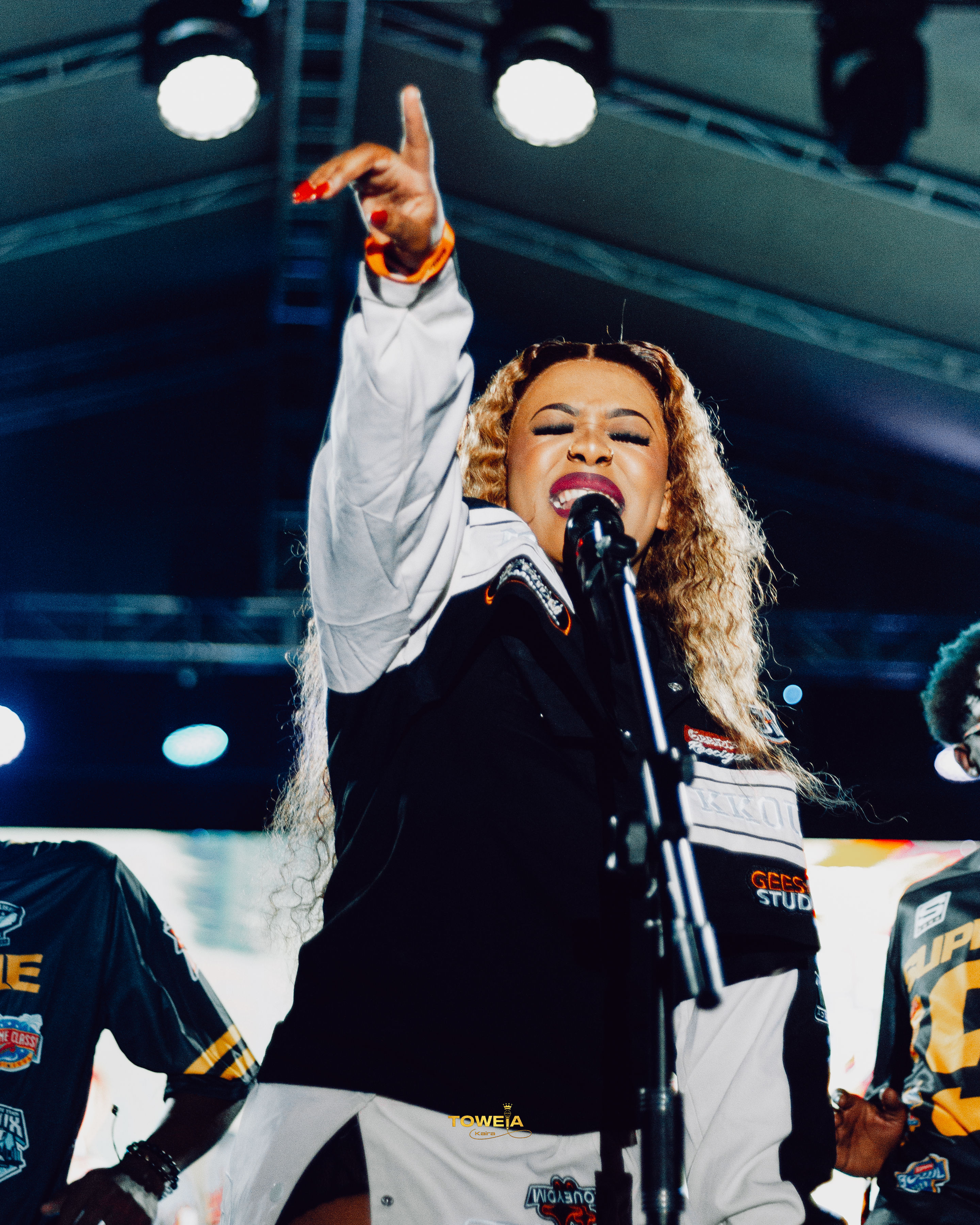
- Towela Kaira in 2024
- Born: Towela Kaira; 9 December 1993 (age 32); Lusaka, Zambia
- Occupations: Singer; Songwriter; Performer
- Years active: 2019–present
- Children: 1
- Relatives: Macky 2 (brother); Chef 187 (brother)

Towela Kaira (/təˈwɛləˈkaɪrə/ tə-WEL-ə-KY-rə; born 9 December 1993) is a Zambian singer, songwriter, and performer, professionally known mononymously as Towela. Her music spans Afro-fusion, R&B, and pop. She has also appeared in the television series Mungoma, portraying the character Chichi, and has received the Kwacha Music Award for Best Female Artist.

Kaira debuted professionally in 2019 with her single "Gold." She signed with Nexus Music Entertainment in 2020, releasing singles including "No Drama," "Delay," and "Lover." She has collaborated with other Zambian artists, including her brothers Macky 2 and Chef 187. Her career was profiled on the BBC's This Is Africa in 2025, where she discussed her artistic identity and social challenges.

== Discography ==
=== Albums ===
List of studio albums, with selected information
Title	Year	Notes
Open Your Eyes	2022	Debut studio album

=== Singles ===
List of singles, with selected details
Title	Year	Notes
"Gold"	2019	Debut single
"One Day" (feat. Yo Maps)	2019	Collaboration single
"Bon Appetit" (feat. Chef 187)	2019	Featured collaboration
"Delay" (feat. Macky 2)	2020	Featured collaboration
"Lover"	2021	Music video released
"No Drama"	2021	
"Dance to This"	2021	
"Sticky"	2024	
"Amina"	2024	
"Zingati" (feat. BLOOD KID yvok, Xaven & Majoos)	2024	Featured collaboration
"Love or Lifestyle"	2025	
"Love or Lifestyle (Remix)"	2025	Remix version
"Pye Pye"	2025	
"Nakuyewa" (feat. Jae Cash)	2025	Featured collaboration
