= Gildo Kassa =

Ethiopian music producer

- Born: April 6, 1995 (age 30); Bale Hawassa, Wolaita, Ethiopia
- Genres: Afrobeats
- Occupations: Songwriter; record producer
- Years active: 2013-present
- Labels: Shakura

Gildo Kassa (Ge'ez: ጊልዶ ካሳ; born April 6, 1995) is an Ethiopian songwriter and record producer. He is well-known for writing and producing music for aspiring young artists. As a singer, he gained prominence in 2019, releasing single called "Lageba New".

== Early life ==
Gildo was born in Wolaita Sodo, Ethiopia. He got the name Gildo because of his first word as a baby, Gil - Gil, and this became Gil-do to mean "one who say gil - gil" in the Wolaytta language. He was raised in a Protestant Christian family which strictly prohibited music. He was inspired by his older brother Kamuzu Kassa to go into music.

== Career ==
Gildo has produced several hit songs, one being "Lageba New" featuring fellow musician Shakura. Per The New Times of Rwanda, Gildo produced more than 300 singles, including more than 59 of his own songs. As he stated in his interview with EBS TV's The Reggae and Afrobeat Music program, his first works were reggae songs by Jalud Awel: "Amta Chaweta" and "Dagos Yale Sitota". Kassa is well known for customizing afrobeat to the Ethiopian traditional music, specifically the Wolaita and Tigrigna styles, naming his style "Ethio-shake". The songs he composed and produced were top hits and were nominated in many Ethiopian awards. Among those are Sancho Gebre's songs "Atasayugn" and "Tanamo".

He is among the Afrimma 2020 Nominees under the category of "Best Male East Africa". He was the only nominee from Ethiopia. Aljazeera put his song "Lageba New" on their "ultimate year-end African music playlist" in 2019.

== Discography ==
=== Singles ===
- "Lageba New" (2019) - Gildo Kassa ft Shakura
