= Dalisoul =

Zambian singer and music producer

- Born: 23 May 1984 (age 41); Zambia
- Other name: Mwana Wamukomboni
- Occupations: Musician; songwriter; rapper
- Musical career
- Genres: Hip hop; New Kalindula; R&B; Zed Beats
- Years active: 2007–present

Dalisoul, also known as Mwana Wamukomboni, is a Zambian singer and music producer. He won the Zambian musician of the year in 2008, 2009 and 2013 at the Kwacha Music Awards.

== Music career ==
Dalisoul began his career on the Copperbelt province in 2007 alongside Dandy Crazy and Baska Baska. He later won the Zambian musician of the year award in 2008. He has since performed in Malawi, Zambia, Botswana.
