= Angel Nyigu =

Tanzanian dancer and choreographer

- Born: Dar Es Salaam, Tanzania
- Occupations: Dancer; Choreographer
- Years active: 2018–present
- Musical career
- Genres: Afro dance, Hip hop, Dancehall
- Label: [individual]

Angel Nyigu is a Tanzanian dancer and choreographer. She has extensively worked with recording artist Diamond Platnumz appearing in his music videos and is the founder of Tanzania Dance. Her dance routines mainly consist of Afro dance, Hip hop and Dancehall.

== Early life and career ==
Angel started dancing at an early age of 16. Before pursuing her career in dancing, she wanted to become an electrical engineer. Her passion for dancing eventually led her to getting more exposure through live performances. She later became popular by posting videos on Instagram where she displayed her dancing skills. In 2015, she joined Kinondoni Talent Search (KTS) where she was the only female in the dancing category. She then moved to a street dance crew, Best of Kino. In 2017, she started working with WCB artists, appearing in music videos. Later that year, she opened her own dance class in Dar Es Salaam.

She has appeared in music videos of popular songs such as "Cheche" by Zuchu and "Jeje" by Diamond Platnumz. She has also featured in wasafi songs such as "Tetema" which is also a 2019 hit song by Rayvanny.

In 2021, she was nominated for Best African dancer at the 8th African Muzik Magazine Awards and 2021 African Entertainment Awards USA.

== Awards and nominations ==
Year	Award ceremony	Prize	Result
2021	African Muzik Magazine Awards	Best African Dancer	Nominated
2021	African Entertainment Awards USA	Best Dancer/Group	Nominated
