= Henry Joe Sakala =

Author

- Born: Henry Joe Sakala; Lusaka, Zambia
- Occupations: Actor, writer, producer, director
- Years active: 1998–present
- Spouse: Linda Muwowo Sakala

Henry Joe Sakala is a Zambian actor, writer, producer and director known for his leading role in a short film Guns and Rings and as writer of the screenplay for the 2009 film, Reflection of Sadness.

== Early life and education ==
Sakala attended Rokana Primary School in Kitwe from 1986 to 1992 and then proceeded to Libala Boys Secondary School from 1993 to 1997 in Lusaka where he completed his GCE Ordinary Levels. He further attended college at Evelyn Hone College of Applied Arts and Commerce from 1999 to 2001 where he studied Diploma in Journalism and Public Relations and also obtained a Certificate in Video Production and Editing.

== Career ==
Sakala worked for TL STUDIOS and Post Newspapers as a reporter from January 2002 to October 2003. He later joined Zambian private television station Muvi TV, where he worked as a trainer for TV producers and journalists, production manager, and scriptwriter/director of feature films and drama series. He also managed the Kids News Department and was involved in production of children's programs.

== Awards and honours ==
Sakala won an Ngoma Award for the play, Living With the Enemy which he wrote in 2001. He also won an award for the short film Guns and Rings in 2006.

== Filmography ==
- Mfuti (2017)
- Silent Voice
- Guns and Rings
- When The Curtain Falls
- Reflection of Sadness
- Street Circles
- Redemption
- Rewind
- The Red Bag
- LSK Heroes
- Survivors
- Dancers

== Bibliography ==
- Unmasked: A Collection Of Short Stories And Poems (2017)
