= Macky =

Macky is both a given name and a surname. It may refer to:

Surname:

- Constance Jenkins Macky (1883–1961), Australian-born American painter, educator.
- Eric Spencer Macky (1880–1958), New Zealand-born American artist, educator
- Frank Macky, Australian rules footballer
- Graham Macky (born 1954), New Zealand long-distance runner
- John Macky (died 1726), Scottish spy
- Neil Lloyd Macky (1891–1981), New Zealand lawyer and military leader
- Willow Macky (1921–2006), New Zealand songwriter

Given name:

- Macky Ali, Indian actor
- Macky Corbalán (1963–2014), Argentine poet and journalist
- Macky Escalona (born 1984), Filipino basketball player
- Macky Makisumi (born 1990), Japanese speedcuber
- Macky Sall (born 1961), Senegalese politician
