= Liloca =

Mozambican singer

- Born: April 29, 1985 (age 40); Tete
- Occupation: Singer . Songwriter
- Title: Mrs
- Spouse: Mr Bow (m-2023)
- Children: 3

Luísa Zélia Sebastiana da Graça Madade known as "Liloca" (born April 29, 1985) is a Mozambican singer.

== Life ==
She was born in Tete in 1985. Her parents were Sebastião Mabuze Madade and Natália Paulo Zimba. At an early age she became interested in dance. She was educated at SOS Elementary School and ISCTEM - Instituto Superior de Ciências e Tecnologias de Moçambique where she studied law, but her ambition was music. She began work as a dancer working for the Mozambique singer "MC Roger". Eventually she branched out and created a dance group named "Sweet Dance ". Her first released song was "Como ela Dance" in 2006 with a followup of '' Muyive''. The following year she won a prize from Rádio Moçambique for her first CD. Further songs were released including joint creations with DJ Ardiles in 2012, Mr. Kuka, DJ Damost and Nstar.

She is popular and her concerts are well attended. She caused some upset when reports of her performance considered her behaviour inappropriate on a day that been named as Children's Day and the audience consisted of parents and children.
