= Jordan Katembula =

JK
- Also known as: JK
- Born: Jordan Katembula; 21 August 1978 (age 47); Ndola, Zambia
- Genres: RnB, Pop,
- Occupations: Musician, Songwriter/Singer/
- Years active: 1997–present
- Labels: JKayo, Dgital X

Jordan Katembula (born 1978) known professionally as JK, is a Zambian singer, songwriter and record producer. He is regarded as one of the pioneers of Zambian music and the R&B genre in Zambia.

== Early life ==
Born in 1978 in Ndola, Zambia, He attended his junior school at Chilengwa Basic School in Ndola and he completed his secondary education at Lubuto Secondary School. At the age of eight he identified himself as a musician.

== Music career ==
=== 1997–2000:early years ===
JK begun his music journey in 1997 when he first recorded a demo at savoy hotel in Ndola with a band known as the ukwa band. In order to accomplish his childhood dream of being a musician, Jk relocated to Lusaka were the grass seemed greener. Within a short while he met rapper MC Wabwino and later featured on his (MC Wabwino) popular album Yamene Yamene album. In 1999 he joined a group called New Age where he was lead vocalist. Before long, in 2000 he left the group and decided to become a sole artist. because of his unblemished voice he was featured on a number of songs including Shatel's hit song naitopela of the Chikondi album.

=== 2001–2003:The rise ===
In 2001 Jk he released his own debut album, the self-titled [JK]. In 2002, J.K. received a Ngoma Award as well as a KORA Award nomination. He also performed in London and South Africa. Furthermore, he received great support from the public. J.K.'s second album, the 14-track Helena, was released in 2003. On one track, he performed a duet with renowned Oliver Mutukudzi, a Zimbabwean musician. This album's style varies from upbeat dance raps, ragga, to slow ballads. On No Pressure, he collaborated on one song with Hugh Masekela from South Africa.

In 2010, Katembula released another album, Kapiripiri, titled after the single "Kapiripiri". It features Salma Doldia, a female Zambian artist. The album was produced by Digital X, a Lusaka-based studio. The "Kapilipili" music video received air play on MTVbase and channel-O.

In 2014 he released a song titled "Telemundo loving" which aired on channel O and all local TV stations in Zambia. Some of his music videos are available on YouTube

== Discography ==
=== Studio albums ===
- JK – 2001
- Helena – 2003
- JKIII – 2004
- Balalolela – 2006
- No Pressure - 2008
- Akapilipili – 2010
- Telemundo Loving – 2014
