= Bomb$hell Grenade =

Zambian singer

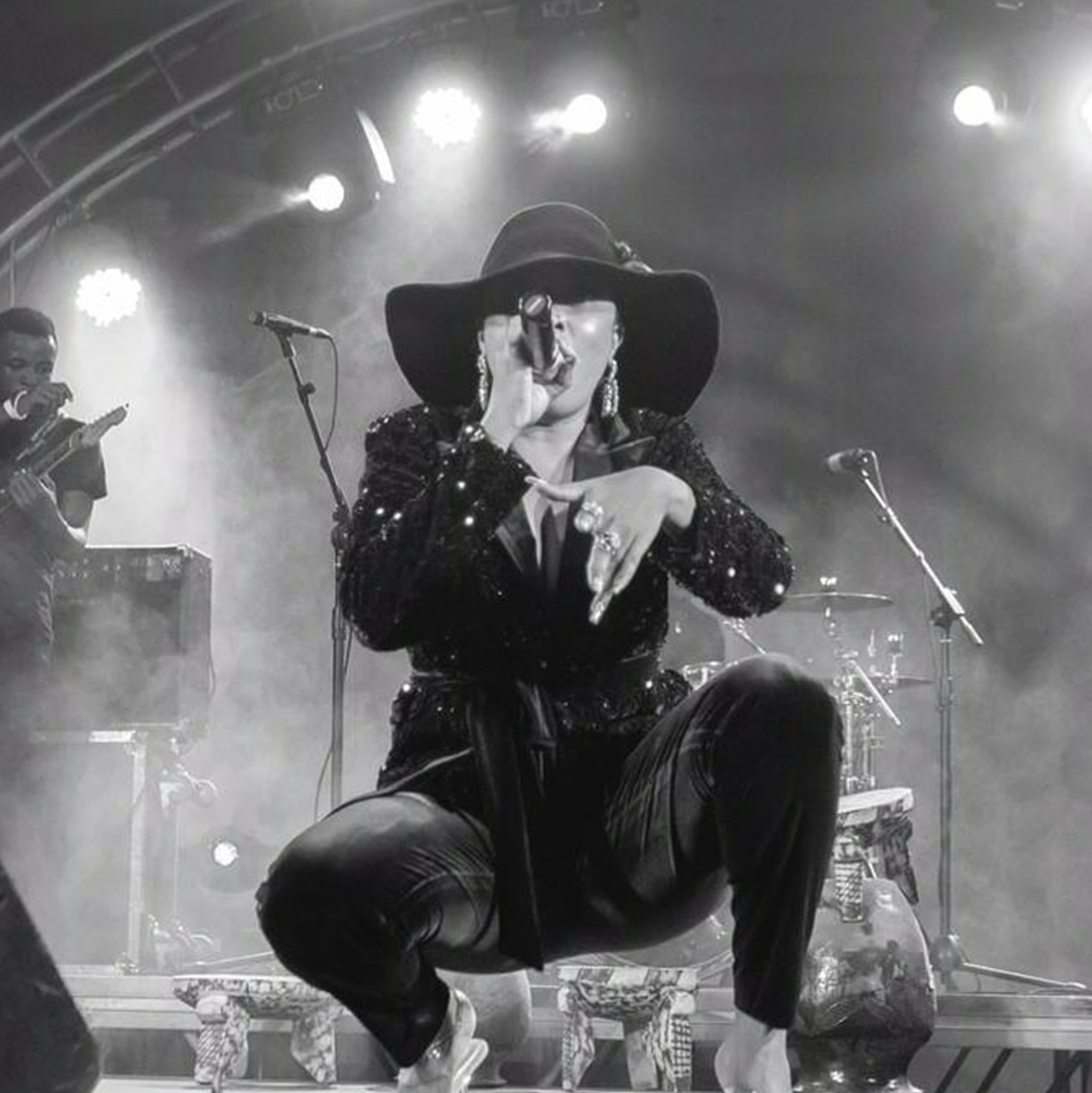
- Born: Bwalya Sophie Chibesakunda; 31 December 1987 (age 38); Lusaka
- Other names: Bomb$hell; Bomb$hell Grenade; Bombshell Grenade; Bombshell
- Occupations: Rapper; Singer; Model; TV Presenter; Activist; Actress
- Years active: 2012–present
- Children: 1
- Musical career
- Genres: Hip hop; dancehall
- Instrument: Vocals
- Label: Nexus Entertainment

Bwalya Sophie Chibesakunda (born 31 December 1987), better known by her stage name Bombshell Grenade, which is written as Bomb$hell Grenade or simply Bombshell, is a Zambian rapper, singer, actress and the 2021 AFRIMMA Best Female Rapper in Africa. She first gained public recognition after the release of her single "The Berg" featuring Jay Rox. Grenade subsequently provided guest vocals for the Kaladoshas song "They Don't Know".

== Early life and career ==
Bombshell was born and raised in Lusaka. She was introduced to hip hop by her uncles. She started rapping at the age of 11 and at the age of 12 she started writing her own songs. She attended the Cape Peninsula University of Technology in Cape Town, South Africa, graduating with a degree in Retail Business Management. In December 2016, she released the single "Shame Ol' Me" featuring Mumba Yachi. In November 2018, she released the single "Jump Off". Her 2019 single "Backshot" was described by the Lukasa Star as one of the year's "hit singles". She is affiliated with the reusable sanitary pad company Urban Girl, stating in January 2020, "It gives me so much delight knowing that I am helping people out there that are unable to buy the usual sanitary towels."

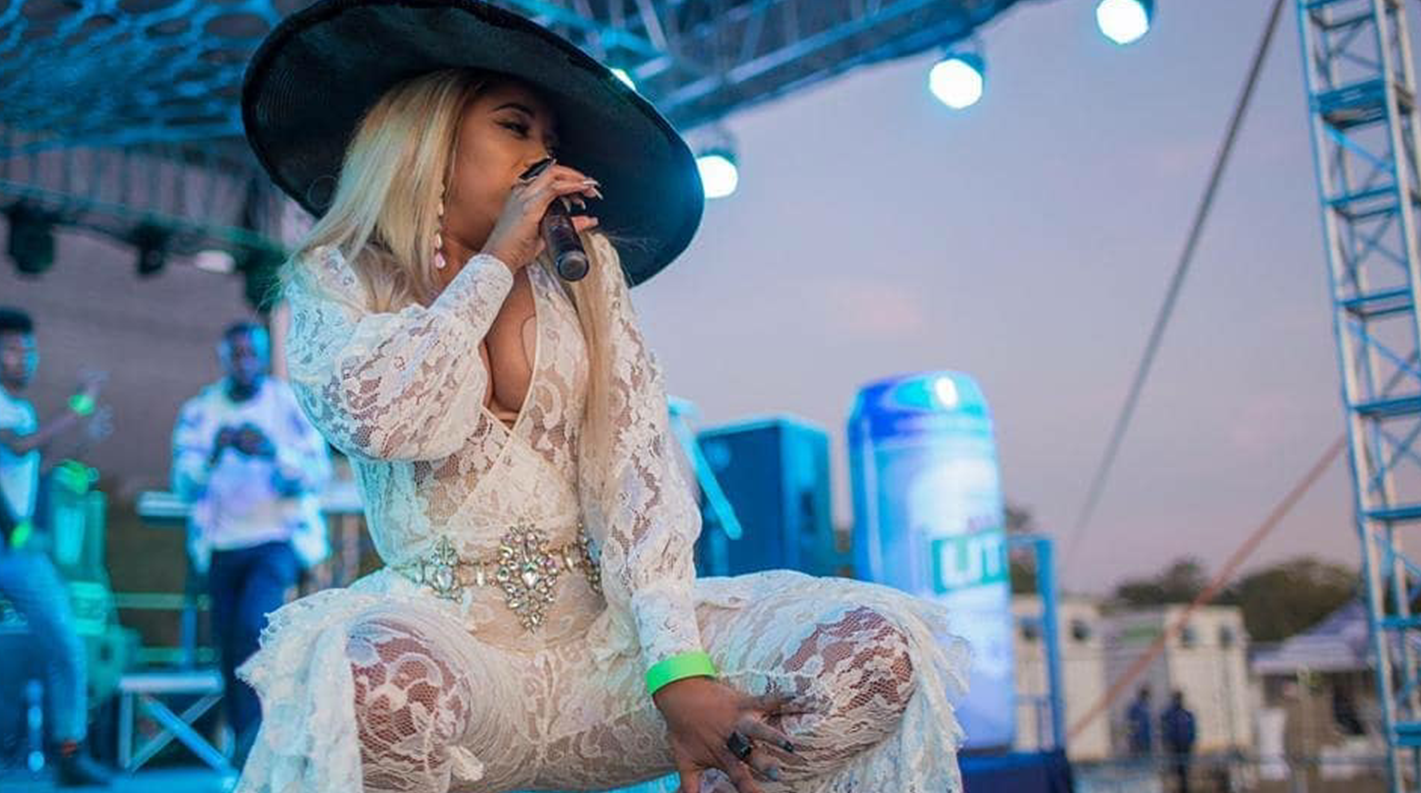
Bombshell on stage

== Recognition ==
In October 2017, Bomb$hell Grenade won the Best Newcomer award at the inaugural Kwacha Music Awards in Lusaka. She was also listed as one of the top six rappers in Africa in 2017 by MTV Base.
