= James Onen =

Ugandan radio personality (born 1975)

- Born: 19 June 1975 (age 51); Kampala, Uganda
- Presenting career
- Show: The Fat Boy Show
- Station: RX Radio
- Time slot: 6am - 10am
- Style: Music, celebrity gossip, news
- Country: Uganda
- Website: www.rxradio.ug

James Onen (born 19 June 1975), known professionally as Fatboy, is a Ugandan award-winning radio presenter on the online station RX Radio. Onen hosts the weekday radio program The Fat Boy Show from 6:00 Am– 10:00 AM James Onen is a popular, albeit controversial DJ in Uganda for his unconventional views towards religion and superstition.

== Personal life ==
Onen grew up in Japan when his father was working for the embassy of Uganda in Japan. Onen is currently single and lives with his dog, Rukia. Rukia is named after an anime character from the anime Bleach. He enjoys spending a lot of his time reading manga series.

Onen is quite vocal about his atheism and has set up organizations to combat superstition and mysticism in Uganda.

James is also an avid gamer and speaker of Japanese.
