= Mumba Yachi =

- Born: Shadreck Fundi; June 14, 1986 (age 39); Mokambo, D.R Congo
- Occupations: Musician; songwriter; producer
- Children: 2
- Musical career
- Genres: Kalindula; Folk
- Instruments: Guitar; Flute
- Years active: 2009 – Present
- Labels: Rehogoo Music; Vibrant-Africa Art And Media Productions

Shadreck Mukenge (born June 14, 1986) better known by his stage name Mumba Yachi, is a Congolese musician based in Zambia.

== Career ==
Mumba Yachi's love for music developed at a very young age. He grew up listening to Kalindula and Rhumba music. P. K. Chishala and Franco Luambo are said to be one of the people that inspired him to become a musician.

In 2009, he began his singing career. Since then, he has been nominated and has won various awards. He has worked with many different Zambian artists such as Chef 187, Slapdee and many others.

== Discography ==
=== Studio albums ===
List of studio albums with selected details
Title	Details
Webuchushi	Released: 2010; Formats: CD
Mokambo	Released: 2012; Formats: CD
Mongu Rice	Released: 2013; Formats: CD
I Am Lenshina	Released: 2015; Formats: CD
The Great Work	Released: 2017; Formats: CD
The Great Work Vol. 2	Released: 2019; Formats: CD • Digital download
Violet	Released: 2022; Formats: CD • Digital download

=== Singles ===
Title	Year	Album
"You Are my Love"	2013	
"Iso Mone" (feat. Slapdee)		
"Ing'omba"	2017	
"Ifya Kumwena Kubukulu" (feat. Chef 187)		
"Mutinta"		
"Because Of You" (feat. T-Low)		
"Lweendo Lwa Mfumu"		
"Winning" (feat. Stevo)		

== Controversy and legal issues ==
In 2017, Mumba was arrested by Zambia's Immigration Department when they discovered that he was a Congolese who had illegally obtained Zambian citizenship. The Immigration Department's public relations spokes officer said that Mumba made up a false identity to obtain a Zambian; NRC and passport with the names "Shadreck Mumba".

Upon his detention and subsequent investigations, Mumba still claimed to be Zambian and denied being Congolese. After a few weeks of investigations, Mumba withdrew the statement in which he claimed to be Zambian and he personally admitted that he was indeed Congolese.

== Filmography ==
On December 11, 2021, Mumba released "Tazara", a musical short film in which he played the role of Fundi, the protagonist. It was directed by Mutembo Ndeke and its executive producer was Jakob Hoff.

== Awards and nominations ==
Year	Award	Category	Result
2010	Born And Bred Awards	Best Foreign Rhythm	Nominated
2016	Zambian Music Awards	Best Live Recording Album	Won
