= Mampi =

Zambian pop and R&B singer (born 1986)

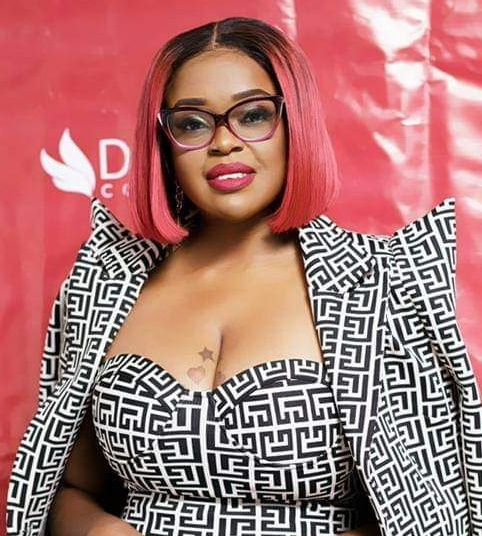
- Mampi in 2022

Background information
- Also known as: Mampi
- Born: Mirriam Mukape; 4 August 1986 (age 40); Lusaka, Zambia
- Genre: R&B
- Occupations: Singer, dancer
- Years active: 2004 – present
- Website: mampisworld.wordpress.com

Mirriam Mukape (born August 4, 1986), popularly known as Mampi, is a Zambian singer, actress and songwriter. Her music is kwaito and reggae inspired. She is one of the most viewed Zambian female artists on YouTube.

== Early life ==
Mampi was born in Lusaka on 4 August 1986. She started singing in church at the age of six. She undertook her primary education at Muyooma Basic School, and secondary education at Libala High School, and the Springfields Coaching Centre in Lusaka. At the age of 14 she lost her mother and then at 16 she lost her father. She found herself homeless at times and was not able to further her education. She cites prayer and being taken in by a friend's sister is what got her through the tough times in her life.

== Music and career ==
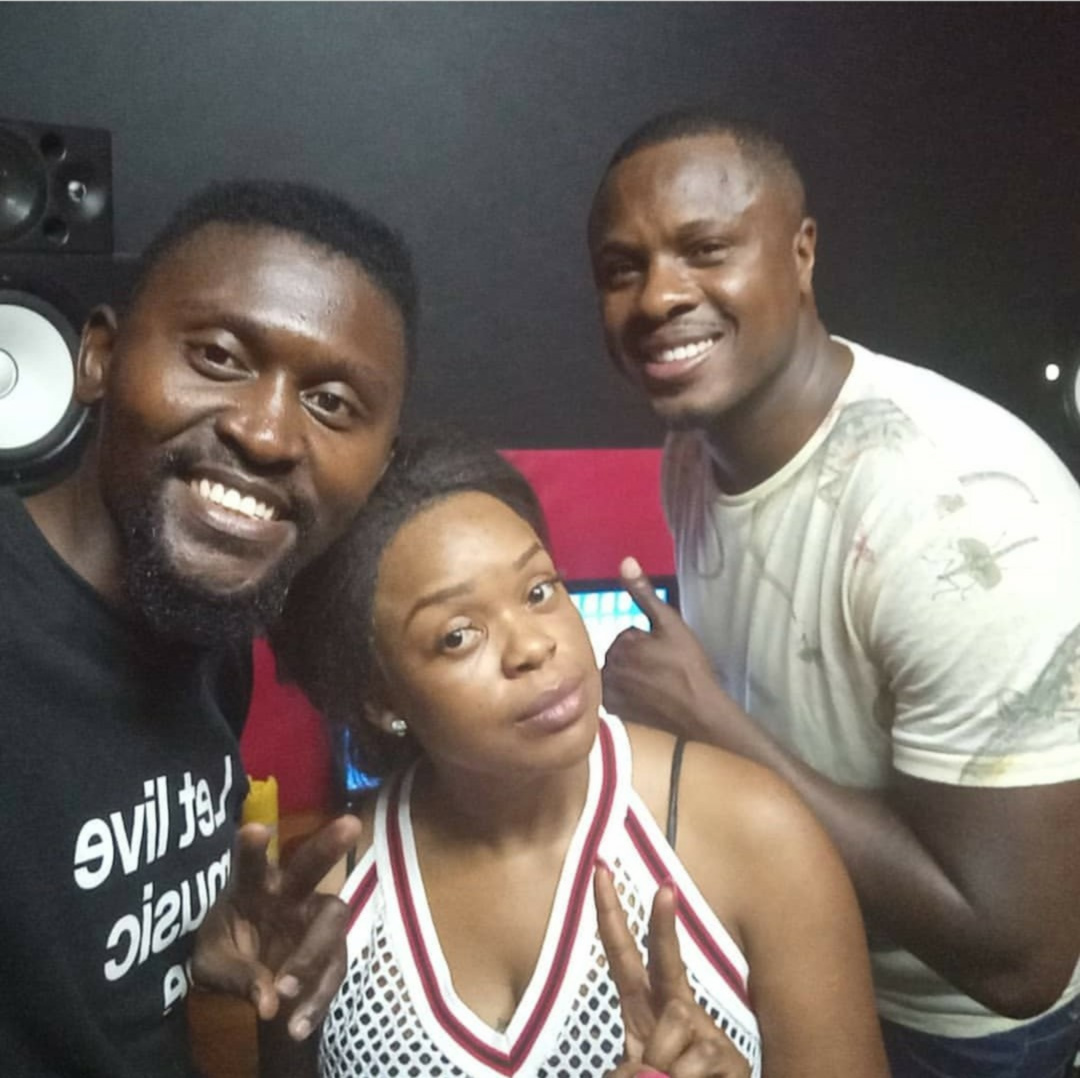
B'Flow, Mampi and KB Killa Beats in 2018 at the K-Army Studios.

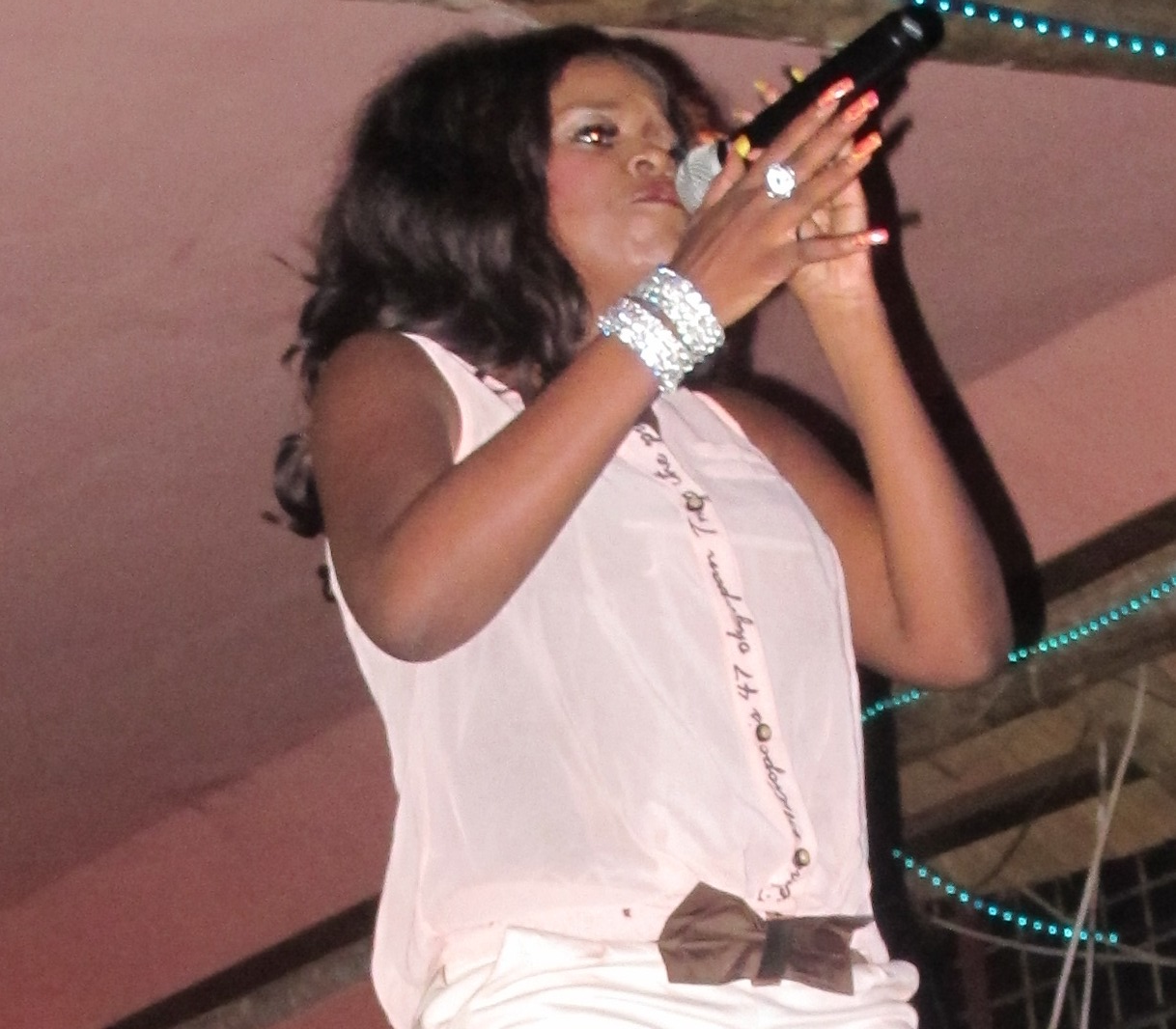
Mampi on stage

Mampi's journey into the music industry coincided with a challenging period in her life—she lost both her brother and father. However, it was during this tumultuous time that she caught the attention of a music producer and secured a record deal in 2003. In 2005, she unveiled her debut album, Maloza, which featured the catchy track "Sunshya". This marked her first appearance on national television, where she performed the song. Her sophomore album, Chimo ni Chimo, graced the music scene in 2007, solidifying her presence as an artist.

The year 2012 brought a significant milestone as she performed in Namibia for the first time, captivating the audience in Windhoek. Mampi's artistic journey continued in 2012 with the release of another album, Natural Born Star. In 2015, Portuguese singer Luyanna paid tribute to Mampi's hit track "Walilowelela" by releasing a version of it. The unique rendition saw Mampi singing some lines in Bemba and Nyanja, while Luyanna lent her voice to other portions in Portuguese. The accompanying music video was a vivid celebration of African culture. Although Mampi didn't appear in Luyanna's video, the two artists collaborated in a music video for a new rendition of Mampi's previously released track, "Why".

December 2017 saw Mampi releasing the single "Nyula Yako" from her upcoming 2018 album of the same name. This dancehall-inspired track came complete with a captivating music video. During that same month, Mampi joined forces with other African musicians, including the South African award-winning DJ Black Coffee, to close out the year with a bang at the Vic Falls Carnival.

== Big Brother Africa ==
Mampi was a contestant during the seventh season of Big Brother Africa 7 as one of the celebrity housemates of the reality competition television series Big Brother Africa StarGame. Mampi was evicted from Big Brother Africa on 27 May 2012; she was in the house for 21 days. Big brother added to the celebrity of Mampi in Zambia among the female musicians.

== Discography ==
=== Albums ===
Year	Albums	Ref
2005	Maloza	
2007	Chimo ni Chimo	
2012	Natural Born Star	

=== Singles ===
- Nyula Yako
- Rollercoaster
- Masobela Yatu
- Ubepele Fye
- Amama
- Inna Your Heart

== Awards and nominations ==
Year	Award	Category	Result	Ref
—	Zambia Music Awards	Best Mainstream Female Artist	Won	
—	Kwacha Music Awards	—	Won	
—	Afrimma Awards	—	Nominated	
—	Ngoma Awards	—	Nominated	
