= Xaven The Kopala Queen =

Zambian hip hop musician

- Born: Rachel Chakwa Mwewa; 1 September 1998 (age 27); Zambia
- Occupations: Rapper; singer; songwriter
- Musical career
- Genres: Hip hop; R&B; Zed Beats
- Years active: 2019- present

Rachel Chakwa Mwewa, commonly known as Xaven The Kopala Queen, is a Zambian rapper and singer. In 2022, she won the Zambian Female Artist of the Year at the Diamond TV personality award, becoming the first female artist from the Copperbelt to win the award.

== Career ==
Xaven began her music career at a young age. However, she became a noticeable figure in Zambian music after releasing singles titled “Ndine woloweshe” and “Adedesha” among others, which propelled her to the Zambian Female artist of the year award. She is managed by Jerahyo alongside Chanda Na Kay.
