= Coco Argentée =

Cameroonian singer-songwriter

- Birth name: Corine Céline Ntyame
- Born: August 13, 1982; Mbandjock, Centre Cameroon
- Genres: Bikutsi, Zouk
- Occupation: Singer-songwriter
- Years active: 2010–present

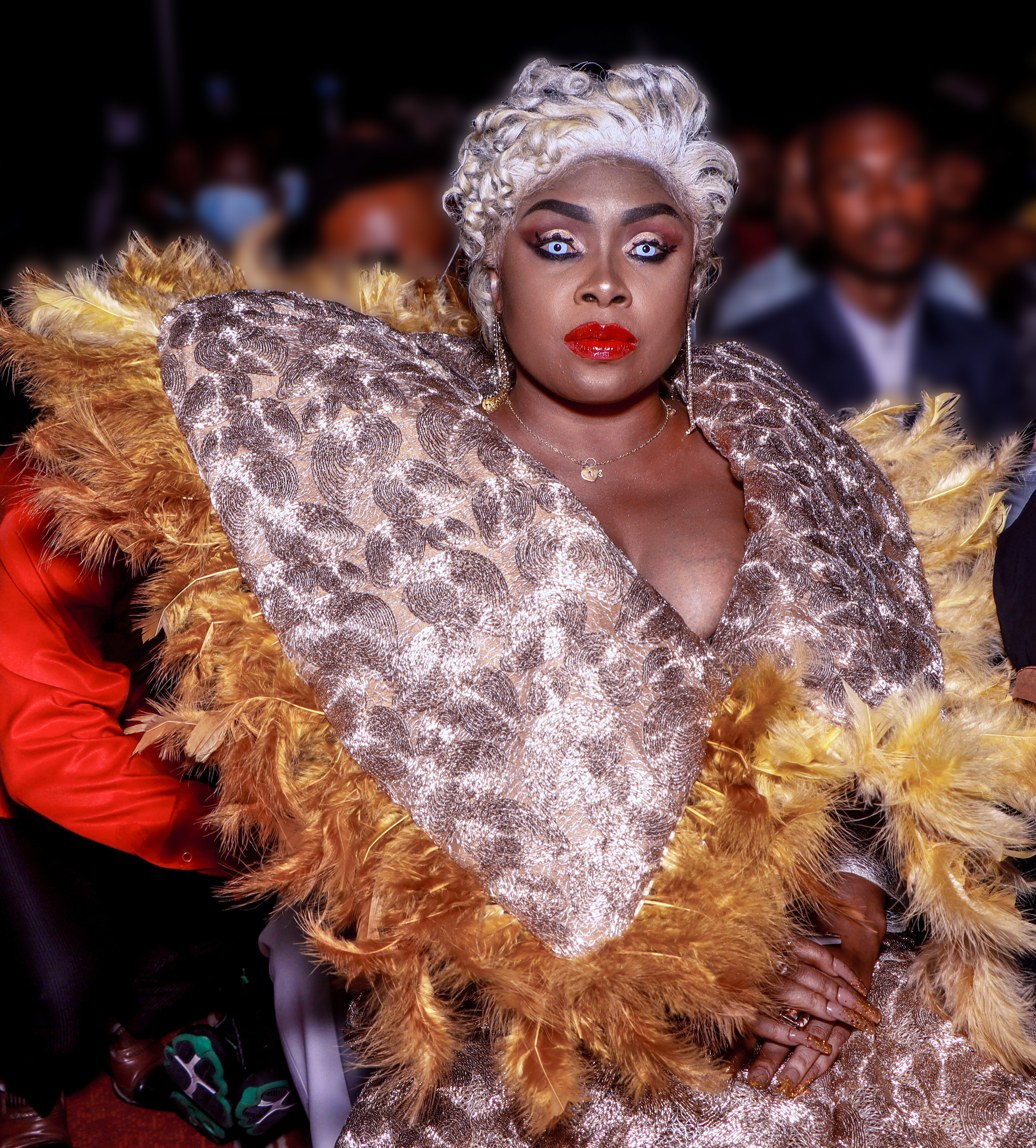

Coco Argentée, (originally Corine Céline Ntyame), was born August 13, 1982, in Mbandjock, Centre Cameroon. This Cameroonian singer and songwriter lives in Belgium.

Argentée began her career in 2010 with the successful release of the song, Dans la tanière, of her first album Nostalgie. In February 2016, she released Crayon de Dieu, a maxi single of two titles. This single earned her the nickname La Go Galaxy. Coco Argentée now has three albums. The third album, Ouragan, was released in June 2018.

== Biography ==
=== Childhood and early beginnings ===
Coco's mother died when she was very young and she grew up with her father, sisters and stepmother.

She embraced music at a young age. At the age of six, she joined the Protestant choir "The Voice of the Angels" at Ngoumou. A few years later, she started the group Les Feeling Girls that performed at the Manu Dibango concert at Mvogt College. She left the group when her father, Thomas Mekoulou Ndengue, a railwayman, was transferred to Ngaoundere, in the Adamawa Region where she sang in cabarets without the knowledge of her parents. At the age of 19, she won two awards: the Commonwealth Prize and the UNESCO Prize.

In 2003, Coco Argentée left Cameroon for Chad where she earned a bachelor's degree in 2004. She then moved to N'Djamena and performed in cabarets until 2006 when she settled in Belgium, where she currently lives with her husband, and their two children. She completed a training program and worked as a nurse for several years, until she released her first album, leaving the healthcare industry, to focus on her musical career.

=== Career ===
Coco Argentée's solo career began in 2010 with the release of her first album Nostalgie, consisting of eight tracks. The album combines the musical genres of Bikutsi and Zouk. The most popular album track is Dans la tanière, a tribute to the city of Ndjamena where she began her career, had considerable success in both Kamer, and N'Djamena. The album won awards, including Musical Revelation of the Year for 2012 at Canal 2'Or and Best Bikutsi of 2013 at Festi-Bikutsi.

In April 2014, Argentée released a 10 track second album, Trésor, of which the song Fallait Pas, recorded in Cameroon, was quite popular. The album references Cameroonian music icon Talla André-Marie, in the song Bikutskin.

In February 2016, Argentée released the song Le crayon de Dieu that nos has more than 2 million YouTube views. Femme et Coco Jackson was released in 2017.

In June 2018, Coco Argentée released her third album entitled Ouragan. The 11 track album is supported by 10 concurrently released YouTube videos.

== Discography ==
=== Albums ===
- 2010: Nostalgie
- 2014: Trésor
- 2018: Ouragan

=== Singles ===
- 2016: Le crayon de Dieu
- 2017 : Coco Jackson
- 2017: Femme
- 2021:le amour vrai

== Prizes and awards ==
- 2012: Best Diaspora artist in the Planet Star Music Awards
- 2013: Musical revelation of the year at the ninth edition of Canal 2'Or
- 2013: Best Bikutsi of the year at Festi-Bikutsi
- 2014: Balafon Music Awards album of the year
- 2014: Artist of the year at the Balafon Music Awards
- 2015: Best female artist at the tenth edition of Canal2'Or
