= T-Sean =

- Born: Richard Mulenga; August 10, 1991 (age 34) kitwe, Zambia
- Other names: Mr. Baila; Dancehall Daddy
- Occupations: Musician; songwriter; producer
- Children: 2
- Musical career
- Genres: Hip hop; Reggae; Dancehall; R&B
- Instruments: Piano; Guitar
- Years active: 2008–present

Richard Mulenga (born August 10, 1987), popularly known as T-Sean, is a Zambian Afropop & Dancehall artist.

== Career ==
In 2010, T-Sean established himself as a reggae and dancehall artist. His first songs were "Wonder Why", which featured B1, and "Show Me Ya Swag" in which featured Macky 2, Cactus and T-Bwoy. This was the beginning of his musical collaborations with the dancehall artist T-Bwoy. He wrote and performed songs that received major radio airplay and in 2011, he was nominated for a Born and Bred Award, for his song "Sinizaibala".

== Discography ==
=== Studio albums ===
List of studio albums with selected details
Title	Details
Adamu (The definition)	Released: 2012; Formats: CD
90 Days	Released: 2013; Formats: CD
Time-bomb	Released: 2014; Formats: CD
Grateful	Released: 2018; Formats: CD
Purpose	Released: 2021; Formats: CD • Digital download

=== Singles ===
Title	Year	Album
"Dear Wanga"		
"90 Days"	2013	90 Days
"Sinizaibala"		
"Mulipo"		
"Try Again"		
"Don't Lead Me On"		
"Speedometer Burn Up"		
"Father Bless Me"	2022	

== Awards and nominations ==
Year	Award	Category	Result
2014	Mosi Zambia Music Awards	Best Dancehall Album	Won
2015	Born & Bred	Best RnB Video Of The Year	Won
2015	Born & Bred	Best Dancehall Album	Won
2015	Born & Bred	Video Of The Year	Won
