= Sancho Gebre =

Ethiopian singer and choreographer (born 1993)

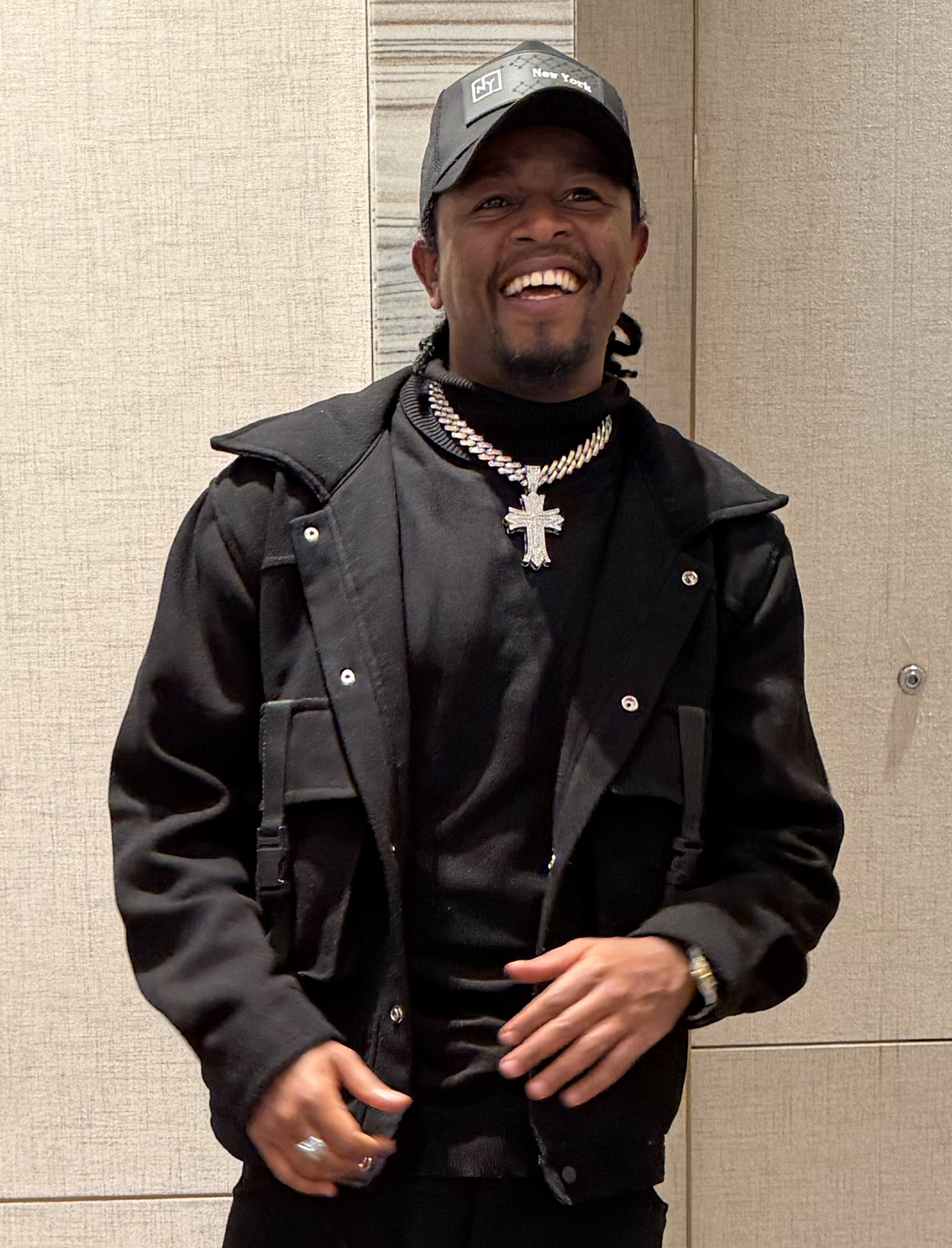
- Sancho Gebre in 2026

Background information
- Born: Tamirat Gebre; October 7, 1993 (age 33); Wolaita Sodo, Ethiopia
- Genres: Afrobeats; Ethiopian music
- Occupations: Singer; choreographer; dancer
- Years active: 2010–present
- Label: Shakura
- Website: www.sanchogebre.com www.t.me/sanchogebre

Tamirat Gebre (Ge'ez: ታምራት ገብሬ; born October 7, 1993), known professionally as Sancho Gebre, is an Ethiopian singer, choreographer and dancer.

== Life and career ==
=== 1993–2008: Early life ===
Sancho was born in Wolaita Sodo and raised in Areka. Sancho's interest in art grew from an early age when he was in high school. As he stated in his interviews with Seifu On EBS TV talk show and ARTS TV, he was impersonating Michael Jackson dance by watching his music videos. He participated in a high school dance contest and won the competition; the competition was a one-day contest. That was the time he joined the art.

=== 2009–2011: Career beginnings ===
In 2009 he started the competition in Ethiopian Idol as a single modern dance contestant. The competition ended in 2011 and he was a winner in the single modern dance category.

=== 2016–2020: First singles ===
In 2016 Sancho joined the music industry by releasing his debut single, "Ande". Sancho got positive reaction from his debut and the choreography of the music video was popular. He then released four songs titled "Atasayugn", "Tanamo", "Leba" and "Fiyona. He has shown different choreography in his all music videos which are done by himself and participated on all music videos as a dancer too. He is known for his choreography and dances in his music videos. Popnable stated that Sancho Gebre's songs spent 79 weeks in the music charts. He also contributed choreographing music videos for artists in Ethiopia.

== Discography ==
=== Singles ===
From iTunes

- "Chaddas" (2025)
- "Delila" (2024)
- "Anaaf Koottu" (2024)
- "Habibideyda" (2023)
- "Selame" (2023)
- "Welelaye" (2022)
- "Afe" (2022)
- "Dikida" (2021)
- "Fiyona" (2020)
- "Leba" (2019)
- "Tanamo" (2019)
- "Atasayugn" (2017)
- "Ande" (2016)
