= Chanda Na Kay =

Zambian singing duo

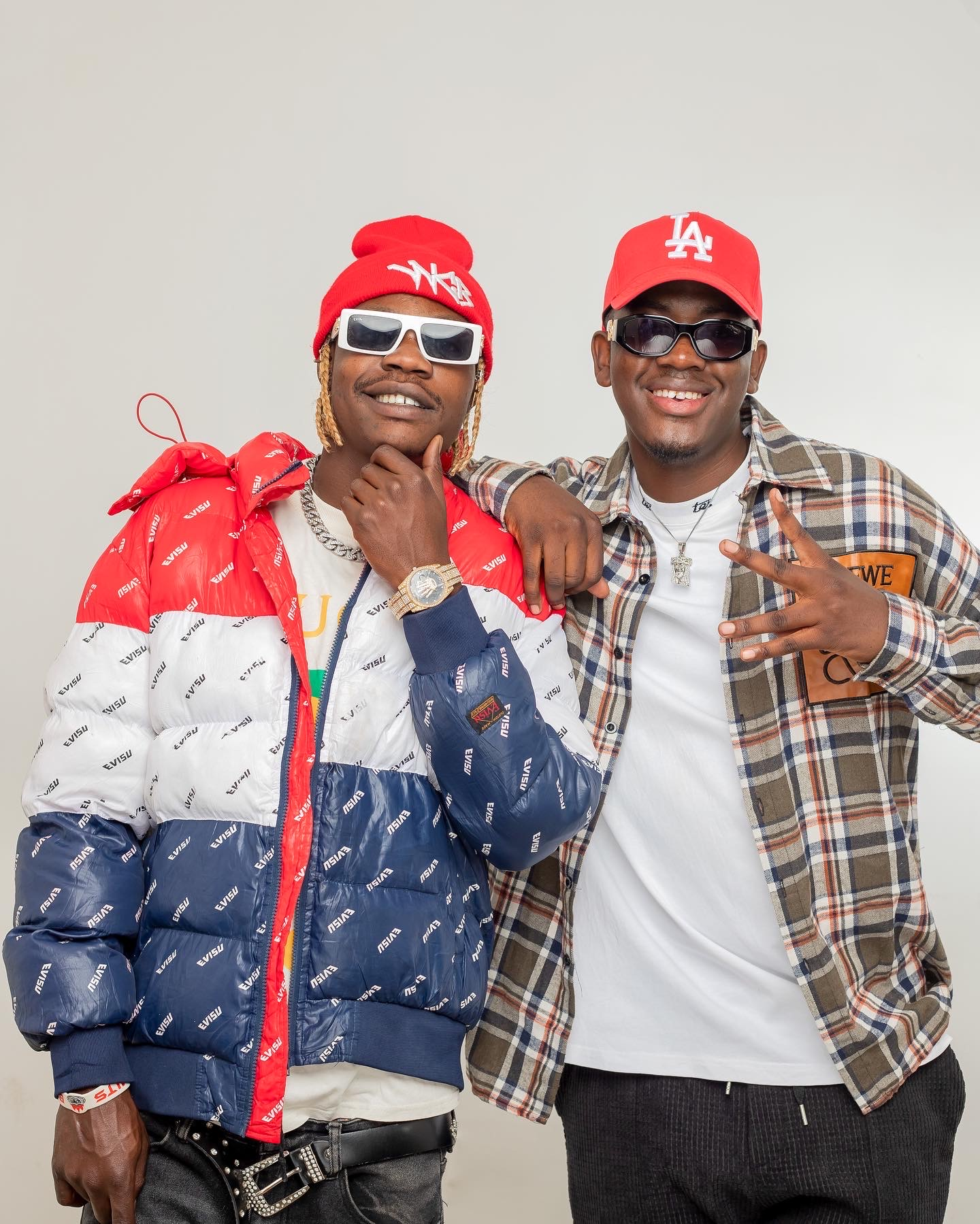
- Chanda Na Kay in 2022

Background information
- Also known as: Aba Nyoli Nyoli
- Occupation(s): Artiste, Musicians
- Years active: 2019

Chanda Na Kay are a Zambian singing duo based on the Copperbelt. In July 2021, they won the Kwacha Music Award for the best Zambian duo. In December 2022, they won the best duo award at the 8th African Entertainment Annual Awards, becoming the first Zambians to do so. They have also won the Zambezi Music Awards. The Duo consists of “Apa ni Chanda”, born Edward Chanda, and “Apa ni Kay”, born Kelvin Simfukwe. They are signed under Nexus music.

== Early life ==
Both Chanda Na Kay were born in the mid-2000s in Chimwemwe Township of Kitwe. Nicknamed Aba Nyoli Nyoli for "greatest rapper", both Chanda Na Kay grew up in the mining province from which they began their career.

=== Apa ni Kay ===
Kelvin Simfukwe popularly known as Apa Ni Kay of Chanda Na Kay, was born on the 17th of April, 1998 at Kitwe Central Hospital. He went to Buntungwa Primary School, Natwange Primary School then later finished his secondary at Kitwe Boys Secondary School in 2017. He was born and raised in chimwemwe by his biological parents and started his music career in 2013 as a single artist until he met his partner Edward Chanda in 2020 and became a music duo.

=== Apa ni Chanda ===
They headlined in Zambia which was on the kopala experience and went on to winning two awards at the kwacha awards, three at the nexus awards.

== Music career ==
Chanda Na Kay began their career on the Copperbelt. Some of their music include songs of Bella Bella, Chilowe, Itepe, Alikwi, Tulibamobene and Physically Fit and Bulongo which won the song of the year 2022. In 2023, they won the African Duo Entertainment.
