= Slapdee =

Zambian rapper

- Also known as: King Dizoh
- Born: Mwila Musonda; 27 April 1987 (age 39); Zambia
- Genres: Hip hop
- Occupations: Rapper; record producer; businessman
- Years active: 2006–present
- Label: XYZ Entertainments • Kalandanya Music Promotions
- Website: slapdeemusic.com

Mwila Musonda (born April 27, 1987), known professionally as Slapdee, is a Zambian hip hop and rap musician. Having won multiple awards since his debut in 2006, he is often regarded one of the pioneers of Zambian hip-hop.

== Early life ==
Slapdee was raised by his aunt, after losing his parents and brother. Because of his aunt’s career, he moved around often, even attending schools in Botswana and South Africa. During his high school years, Slapdee returned to Zambia where he befriended future musician Hamoba, and the two started making music together. He has helped bring to light many upcoming artists including Xaven The Kopala Queen

== Music career ==
His musical career began in 2006 when he released "Asembe Isebenza". After a while it got identified by promoter Sync. He released a debut album “Asembe isebenza” and gained radio hype and generated a buzz in the Hip-hop underground. Although his debut album wasn't a success, Slapdee released a second album So Che, with the songs Solola and Takwaba.

He also collaborated with songbird Sutu on Disposable and Kamba Che. In 2009 his third album Black na White was released with successful songs such as Gold Digger, Fo’Shizzy and Chishinka.

Slapdee has released 7 studio albums: Asembe Isebenza, So Che, Black na White, True Story, The Business, Black na White 2 (BW2) and Mother Tongue. Slapdee is signed to the Zambian record label XYZ Entertainments, which he founded.

== Awards and nominations ==
Slapdee has received nominations and awards, including the 2009 Ngoma Music Award for best hip hop artist, an AFRIMMA Award nomination for Best Male (artist) Southern Africa, 9 ZMA awards for best male and hip hop artist, and six Sun FM Kwacha Music Awards, winning three in 2017 and three in 2002.

At the 2013 Zambia Music Awards, his album The Business won Slapdee six awards, including Song of the Year, Best Hip Hop Album and Best Male Album. Slapdee’s impact on the Zambian music industry is so forceful that in 2016, even before he released his album Black na White 2, his fans nominated the album for Best Hip Hop Album at the Zambia Music Awards. He also won three awards each at the 2017 and 2018 Zambia Music Awards.

Slapdee’s musical career was also recognised with an award at the MTV Africa Music Awards and six awards at the Sun FM Kwacha Music Awards. He made history, as the first Zambian rapper to win at the country’s Ngoma Awards, which celebrates the nations art industry.

Here's the list of all his awards and nominations: 2009 - Best Hip Hop Artist at the Ngoma Music Awards (Won) 2009 - Best Male in Southern Africa at the AFRIMM Awards (Nomination) 2009 - Best Male and Hip Hop Artist at the Zambia Music Awards (Nomination) 2013 - Song of the Year at the Zambia Music Awards (Won) 2013 - Best Hip Hop Album at the Zambia Music Awards (Won) 2013 - Best Male Album at the Zambia Music Awards (Won) 2014 - Best Hip Hop/Rap Album at the Zambia Music Awards (Won) 2014 - Best Mainstream Album at the Zambia Music Awards (Won) 2014 - Best Male Mainstream Album at the Zambia Music Awards (Won) 2015 - Best Male Southern Africa at the AFRIMM Awards (Nominated) 2016 - Best Hip Hop Album at the Zambia Music Awards (Nominated) 2017 - Best Hip Hop Song at the Sun Fm Kwacha Music Awards (Won)

Slapdee participated in the 2017 Coke Studio Africa television series.

As of 2017, Slapdee was the most searched Zambian musician on Google.

He is the regional brand ambassador for Kung Fu Energy drink, the Fruitola drink, and the Itel mobile phone.

In 2019 He featured on the CNN African Voices CHANGEMAKERS as The multi-award-winning Zambian hip-hop artist who helps support local kids in Zambia through his record label and raising donations for local orphanages and children's hospitals.
