= Yo Maps =

Zambian singer, songwriter and music producer

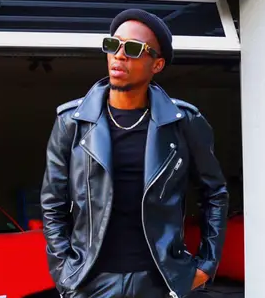
- Yo Maps in 2022
- Born: Elton Mulenga; November 29, 1994 (age 31); Kasama, Zambia
- Other name: • Maps
- Occupations: Musician; songwriter; producer
- Spouse: Kidist Kifle (m. 2022)
- Children: 2
- Musical career
- Genres: Afro-soul; Afro-pop; R&B; Zam-Rock; Hip-Hop
- Instrument: Vocals
- Years active: 2008 – Present
- Label: Olios Records

Elton Mulenga (born November 29, 1994), commonly known as Yo Maps, is a Zambian singer, songwriter and music producer.

== Early life and career ==
Mulenga was born on November 29, 1994, in Kasama. When he was 18, he and his family moved to Kabwe; where he recorded his first single titled 'Njikata Kuboko' in 2016. In 2018, he featured Macky 2 on a hit single titled 'Finally' which eventually became his breakout signature song.

== Personal life ==
Mulenga dated Prudence Nakamba (popularly known as Mwizukanji) until 2020 when they broke up. They have a daughter together named Bukata. After the break up the same year, he dated Kidist Kifle with whom he was reportedly living with. On April 23, 2022, Mulenga married Kidist Kifle, and together they have a daughter, Tendai. Since then, his wife Kidist Kifle appears in some of his music videos and manages an aspect of his public persona.

== Discography ==
Yo Maps discography
- Studio albums: 4
- Singles: 20
- Music videos: 30

=== Studio albums ===
List of studio albums with selected details
Title	Details
Komando	Released: 2021; Formats: CD, digital download
Try Again	Released: 2023; Formats: digital download
My Hero	Released: 2024; Formats: digital download
Vibes on Vibes	Released: 2026; Formats: digital download

=== Singles ===
As lead artist

List of singles as lead artist, with selected chart positions
Title	Year	Peak chart positions				Certifications	Album
Title	Year	NGR	RSA	GHA	UK	Certifications	Album
"Njikata Kuboko" (featuring T-Gear)	2016	–	–	–	–		—N/a
"Finally" (featuring Macky 2)	2018	–	–	–	–		—N/a
"Mr. Romantic"	2022	–	–	–	–		—N/a
"Try Again" (featuring Abel Chungu)	2023	–	–	–	–		Try Again
"Fatima" (featuring Berita)	2023	–	–	–	–		—N/a
"So Mone" (featuring Tay Grin)	2023	–	–	–	–		—N/a
"Nga Teba Yahweh"	2024	–	–	–	–		—N/a
"Confirmation" (featuring Iyanya)	2024	–	–	–	–		—N/a
"Superman" (featuring Omarion)	2024	–	–	–	–		—N/a
"Bana Bandi"	2024	–	–	–	–		My Hero

As featured artist

List of singles as featured artist, with selected chart positions
Title	Year	Peak chart positions				Certifications	Album
Title	Year	NGR	RSA	GHA	UK	Certifications	Album
"Mapalo" (Jemax featuring Yo Maps)	2018	–	—	—	—		—N/a
"Season Yanga" (Bobby East featuring Yo Maps)	2019	–	—	—	—		—N/a
"Don't Go Away" (Mr. Crown featuring Yo Maps)	2023	–	—	—	—		—N/a

== Awards and nominations ==
Year	Award	Category	Nominee/Work	Result	Ref.
2019	Ngoma Awards	Song Of The Year	'Finally'	Won	
2022	Ngoma Awards	Outstanding Musician Of The Year	Yo Maps	Won	
2022	Ngoma Awards	Album Of The Year	'Komando'	Won	
2022	Ngoma Awards	Song Of The Year	'Mr. Romantic'	Won	
2022	African Entertainment Awards USA	Best Male Artist	Yo Maps	Won	
2025	AFRIMA Awards	Best Male Artist in Southern Africa	Yo Maps	Won	
