= Macky 2 =

Zambian singer & Rapper

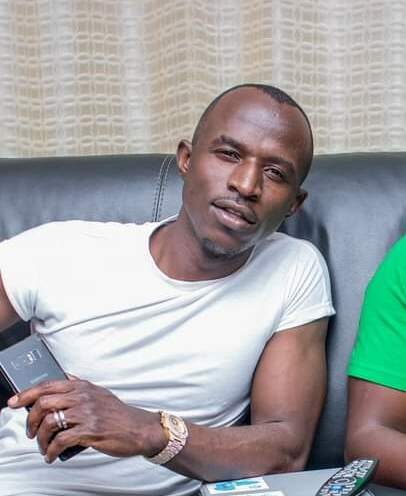
- Born: Mulaza Kaira; 10 October 1984 (age 41); Luanshya, Zambia
- Other names: MK; Dj Bugar; Flava Boy
- Occupations: Musician; songwriter; Record producer; Videographer; Actor
- Spouse: Cheelo Hantiinga Kaira (m. 2015)
- Children: 2
- Relatives: Chef 187 (brother); Mariachi Kaira (brother); Towera Kaira (sister)
- Musical career
- Genres: Hip-hop; R&B; Dunka Music; Kalindula
- Years active: 2007– 5 June 2022
- Labels: Alpha; Entertainment; Kalandanya music promotion; Olijaba; Entertainment

Mulaza Kaira (born 10 October 1984), also known as Macky II, Macky 2, MK Macky 2, DJ Bugar, and Flava Boy, is a Zambian hip hop musician, singer, songwriter, record producer and actor. He is known for participating in the ninth season of Big Brother Africa, where he placed third in the competition. Kaira is from Chingola, Zambia, and runs the Macky 2 Hope Foundation, which supports orphans and vulnerable children.

In March 2025, Kaira expressed his intention to stand as member of parliament for Nchanga constituency in Chingola District at the 2026 general election.

== Music career ==
Kaira began showing an interest in music in his childhood after attending the Catholic church in Ndola.

In 2011 he went to Lusaka, where he released his album Ndimupondo under the Digital X label with Alpha Entertainment and J-Kayo. Two songs from the album, "I am The President" and "Number 1 Fan", received radio play and were positively received by audiences. Kaira received the Zambia Music Award for Album of the Year in 2013 for his album Legendary. He has performed and began his career alongside Dalisoul and Dandy Krazy. In 2014 He was nominated in the Zambia Music Awards, in the categories of Best Mainstream Artist, Best Hip Hop/Rap Album and Best Collaboration. As of 2022, Macky 2 marked his retirement from active music with an album OLIJABA released on June 5 and the same date marked his official entry into a reality TV show called KING BUGA which premiered on the same date on Zambezi Magic Channel.

== Big Brother Africa 9 ==
Kaira was a contestant on the ninth season of Big Brother Africa; some viewers stated that he was "too quiet". He survived in the house for the full length of the show and received a substantial amount of support from his fans and Zambians at large. He stayed in the house until the ninth and final week, when he was eliminated in third place.

== Personal life ==
Kaira is married to Cheelo Hantiinga with whom he has two children.

== Discography ==
=== Albums ===
- Ghetto President (2018)
- Legendary(2012)
- Ndimupondo
- Too Much Influence (2012)
- Zero to Hero (2013)
- OLIJABA (2022), (released on 5 June)

=== Selected songs ===
- "Feeling Feeling" - 2012
- "Nangu Banchinge" - 2012
- "Mukulu" - 2012
- "Without You" - 2012
- "Too Much Influence" - 2012
- "Ngani Gelo Wandi" - 2012
- "Pamaka" - 2012
- "Why" - 2012
- "Land Lord" - 2012
- "Favor"
- "Mami (niuze)" - 2011
- "Mama Rebecca" - 2015
- "Mrs me" - 2020
- "Sancho (Mwabombeni)" - 2021
- "Early Riser" - 2020
- "Alabalansa" - 2021
- "Google"
- "Beautiful Night (feat. AKA)" - 2021
- "Sitingabwezane" by Paul Smart & Macky2 - 2024 - Label: Yvone Music Africa, a division of Yvone Music Group
- "Soilange" - 2025
