= List of Zambian artists =

The following list of Zambian artists (in alphabetical order by last name) includes artists of various genres, who are notable and are either born in Zambia, of Zambian descent or who produce works that are primarily about Zambia.

== A ==
- Fanizani Akuda (1932–2011), sculptor

== E ==
- Gabriel Ellison (1930–2017), painter, sculptor, graphic artist; assisted in designing the national flag

== F ==
- David Fairbairn (artist) (born 1949), Zambian-born Australian painter and printmaker

== G ==
- Tawny Gray, sculptor

== H ==
- Milumbe Haimbe (born 1974), painter and digital illustrator

== L ==
- John Latham (1921–2006), Northern Rhodesian-born British conceptual artist

== M ==
- William Miko (born 1961), abstract painter and educator
- Mulenga Mulenga (born 1987), painter, writer, sculptor and photographer
- N'gandwe Mwaba (born 1982), self-taught painter and drawer
- Stary Mwaba (born 1976), self taught painter and installation artist

== S ==
- Akwila Simpasa (born 1945), painter, sculptor, and musician

== T ==
- Henry Tayali (1943–1987), painter, sculptor, printmaker, humorist, and educator

== Y ==
- Agnes Yombwe (born 1966), mixed media artist, arts educator, and author

== Z ==
- Cynthia Zukas (born 1931), South African-born Jewish Zambian painter; member of the Order of the British Empire

== See also ==
- Zambian art
- Zambian culture
- Shona art
