= Lechwe Trust =

The Lechwe Trust is a charitable trust which supports Zambian artists and maintains a collection of Zambian art. It was established in 1986 by the artist and philanthropist Cynthia Zukas, the artist Henry Tayali and the ceramist Bente Lorenz.

== Early exhibitions ==
Though the Lechwe Collection originally had no permanent gallery, curated exhibitions were periodically held in various venues. The collection was exhibited in 2000, and again in 2005. For the 2005 exhibition, held at the Lusaka National Museum, William Miko selected 65 artists from the Lechwe Trust Collection. By 2009 the Collection included over 200 works, and a 2009 catalog profiled the work of 72 artists.

The 2009 exhibition Art Lives On, held at the Henry Tayali Gallery, featured work by deceased artists Stephen Kapata, Friday Tembo, Martin Phiri, Shadrick Simukanga, Trevor Noah and Godfrey Setti. A decade later, the 2019 exhibition Art Lives on II featured the work of Flinto Chandia (died 2017) and Lutanda Mwamba (died 2014).

== Lechwe Trust Gallery ==
Since 2018 the trust has operated an art gallery. The Lechwe Trust Art Gallery is now located on Lagos Road in Lusaka.

== Artists represented in the Lechwe Trust Collection ==
Over a hundred artists are represented in the Lechwe Trust Collection, including:

- Gabriel Ellison (1930-2017)
- William Bwalya Miko (born 1961)
- Coinx’ai Qgam (1934–2008)
- Akwila Simpasa (1945–unknown)
- Henry Tayali (1943–1987)
- Agnes Buya Yombwe (born 1966)
- Cynthia S. Zukas (born 1931)
