= Mpapa Gallery =

Art gallery in Zambia

Mpapa Gallery was the first independent art gallery in Zambia, existing in Lusaka from 1978 until 1996.

== History ==
In the early 1970s, Zambia was one of the formidable Front Line States providing support to freedom fighters throughout the Southern African region (often at great cost to its own citizens in terms of access to food, security, freedom of movement and economic resources).

Following independence in 1964, there were moves to support art (notably the establishment of the Art Centre Foundation in 1967) but by 1978 no independent art gallery existed and much of the artwork available was colonially-influenced at a time when Zambia had turned its back on the cultural influences of the countries to the south which were still not liberated.

The African National Congress of South Africa was exiled in Zambia from 1963 and in the 70s its Department of Arts and Culture, under Barbara Masekela was amassing a collection of black South African art. Her views and those of major Zambian artist Henry Tayali on the integrity of African art deeply influenced the founders of Mpapa.

Mpapa Gallery was formed with the specific objective of spotlighting the careers of existing Zambian artists or nurturing the development of new ones.

The creative communities in Zambia faced heartrending losses from HIV/AIDS during the period in which Mpapa Gallery was operating. This impacted upon the sector-wide continuity of achievement, development of creative arts and stability of the art market.

== Artists and achievements ==
During its time, Mpapa showcased the work of such artists as Flinto Chandia, David Chirwa, Mulenga Chafilwa, Tubayi Dube, Gabriel Ellison, Pam Guhrs-Carr, Vic Guhrs, Ruth Hartley (Bush), Stephen Kappata, Berlings Kaunda, Fackson Kulya, Style Kunda, Bente Lorenz, Andrew Makromalis, William Miko, Eddie Mumba, Paulina Mubanga, Lutanda Mwamba, Adam Mwansa, Patrick Mweemba, Germain Ngoma, Blanka Novotny, Dickson Nyendwa, Vincent Phiri, Godfrey Setti, Shadreck Simukanga, Henry Tayali, Friday Tembo, Stephen Williams, Lawrence Yombwe, Cynthia Zukas and Elisha Zulu among others.

It also held exhibitions of Zambian crafts (in association with the Zintu Foundation), ceramics and photography as well as hosting visiting artists such as the American John Franklin Koenig, Cuban artist Manuel Mendive, the British holographer Patrick Keown Boyd and others.

Mpapa provided curatorial advice to Lechwe Trust and to the Chaminuka Art collection. The gallery worked on joint projects with the British, American, Italian, Norwegian (NORAD) and Russian embassies. Working with the British Council workshops for Zambian artists were led by Vincent Woropay and Stephen Mumberson.

Research was carried out on ethical issues around artists’ production and copyright with inputs from Stephens Innocent and, later, The Artists’ Information Company (UK) which contributed to the Legislative Protection of Cultural Property in Zambia. The gallery acted as a resource, library, mentor and informal supplier of materials when none were available.

Curation of exhibits included: “Artists Against Apartheid” raising funds for the Dora Tamana nursery in Lusaka (1985); presentation of Stephen Kappata’s work at the Havana Biennale (1988); representation in New Art from Zambia at the Africa Centre, London and a Retrospective of the work of Henry Tayali at the same venue (1989); Frontline Africa exhibition at Glasgow Mayfest (1990); an exhibition of Kappata paintings at the London Festival Hall (1991) etc.

Mpapa was consulted by Robert Loder CBE in the lead-up to the Triangle Trust-funded Mbile workshops (subsequently Insaka) which enabled artists to work freely in a democratic and sponsored environment. The Gallery was also involved in residencies for Flinto Chandia, David Chirwa and Friday Tembo in Loder’s London Gasworks Studios and contributed to the attendance of Zambian artists to the Pachipamwe and Thapong workshops in Zimbabwe and Botswana.

It closed when funding could not be obtained to develop it into an Art Trust and the Directors were unable to continue their commitment. It remained the only independent, fulltime, professionally curated art gallery at that time and for many years after.

Ruth Hartley published a monograph on the Gallery's history in 2024(^{9})

== Directors and staff ==
Mpapa was established by Joan Pilcher and Heather Montgomerie. In 1984 Ruth Hartley (Bush) assumed the management of the gallery and became a Director along with Patrick Mweemba and Cynthia Zukas. All were unpaid. As the gallery developed, Lutanda Mwamba, David Chirwa and Style Kunda worked as salaried managers. .
