= Mwaba =

Family name

Mwaba is a surname of Zambian origin that may refer to:

- Chanda Mwaba (born 1988), Zambian football midfielder
- David Mwaba, Tanzanian boxer
- Marissol Mwaba (born 1991), Brazilian singer, composer, and multi-instrumentalist of Congolese origin
- Maybin Mwaba (born 1987), retired Zambian football midfielder
- Moses Mwaba, Zambian boxer
- N'gandwe Mwaba (born 1982), Zambian artist
