= Cynthia Zukas =

Zambian painter (1931–2024)

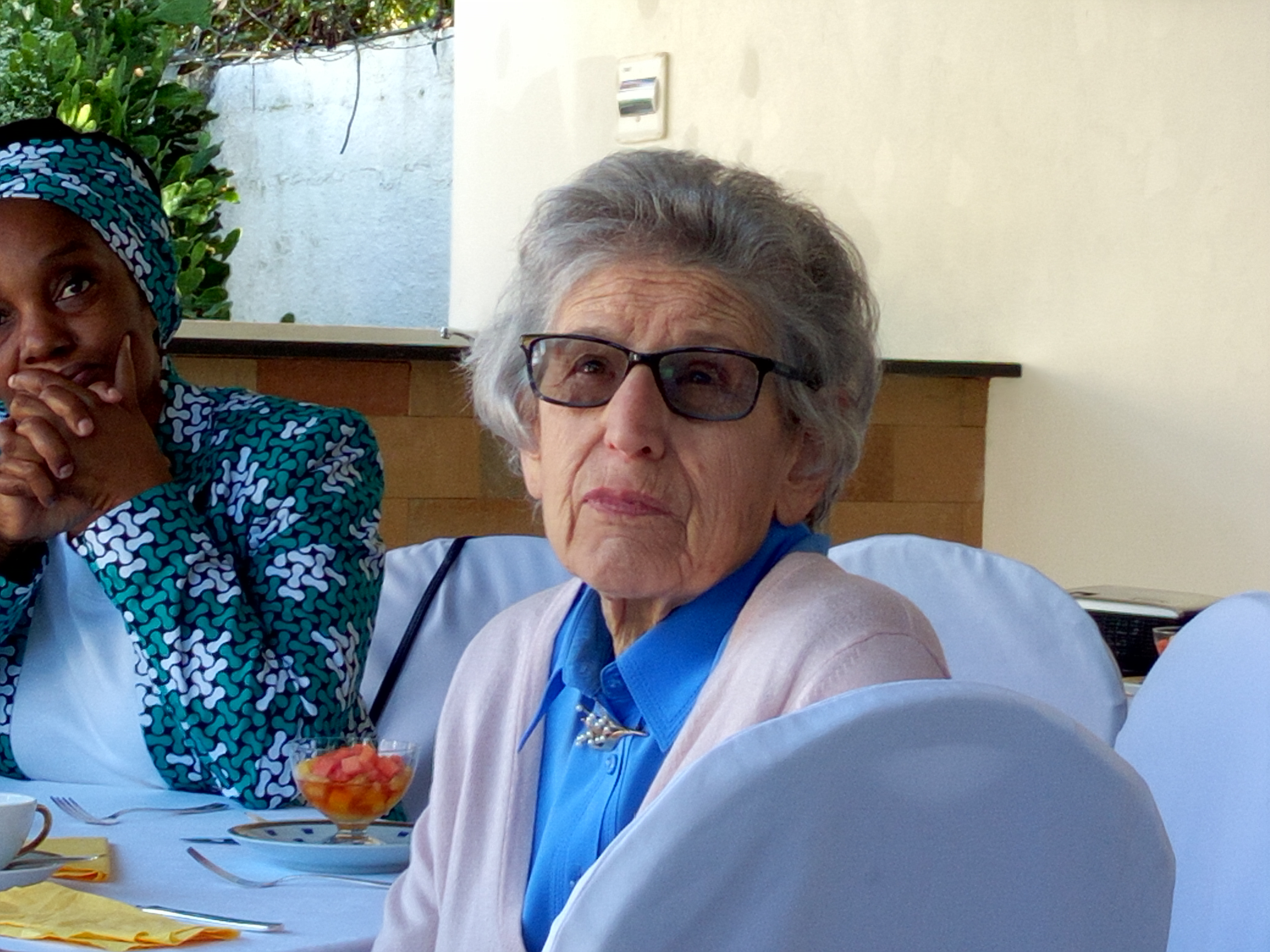
- Zukas in 2018
- Born: 19 February 1931; Cape Town, Union of South Africa
- Died: 23 November 2024 (aged 93)
- Education: University of Cape Town (BA, Fine Art)
- Known for: Drawing, Teaching Art, Painting, Printmaking
- Spouse: Simon Zukas

Cynthia Zukas (19 February 1931 – 23 November 2024) was a South African-born Zambian painter. She received the Order of the British Empire in 2012.

== Early life and education ==
Zukas was born on 19 February 1931 in Cape Town, South Africa. She was Jewish. Zukas went to school in South Africa, where she started her art career, and later went to London where she studied as an art teacher. In London, she met Simon Zukas who she later married.

== Career ==
After a few years, Simon and Cynthia moved to Zambia and Cynthia became a full-time housewife. The two have two children. During her free time, she used to draw, which she did until her death. A few years after coming to Zambia, she was introduced to the Lusaka Art Society. This is where she met different artists and became the secretary of the society. It was later that she cofounded the Lechwe Trust, an organization aimed at developing visual arts in Zambia. She also played a large role in the Zambia National Visual Arts Council (VAC).

Some of the artists that she notes who have contributed to the Zambia's art are Henry Tayali and Valentine Musakanya. It was through her artwork that Zukas earned herself international recognition even among westerners.

== Death ==
Zukas died on 23 November 2024, aged 93.

== Awards ==
| Year | Award | Category | Result |
|---|---|---|---|
| 2000 | National Arts Council | Ngoma award for outstanding contribution in the development of the visual arts | Won |
| 2011 | Julia Chikamoneka Freedom Award | Press Freedom Committee of The Post Newspaper (PFC) | Honored |
| 2012 | Queen Elizabeth II of Great Britain an Order of the British Empire (MBE) | For promoting visual arts in Zambia and for creating a historical archive of Zambian art | Received |
