= Tresford Himanansa II =

Zambian businessman

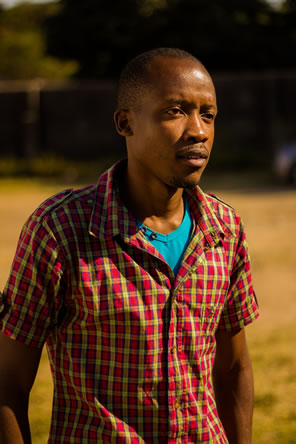
- Tresford Himanansa - XyPNET President & C.E.O.
- Born: Livingstone, Zambia
- Education: Evelyn Hone College
- Occupations: Chairman & CEO - XyPNET LLC
- Years active: 2010-Present
- Known for: Founding Amunzi in 2012
- Relatives: Clive Simanansa (Cousin)
- Website: www.amunzi.com/tresford

Tresford Himanansa is an entrepreneur and innovator in the fields of technology and social media. He, along with his first cousin, Clive Simanansa, is the co-founder and CEO of XyPNET, a technology company that specialises in developing digital platforms. Tresford's expertise in computer science and marketing were influential in the development of Amunzi, a social networking service.

Tresford holds a degree in Computer Studies from Evelyn Hone College.

== Personal life ==
Tresford Himanansa was born in Livingstone on 4 February 1987, the eldest child of Nicholas and Linah Haachilala Himanansa. He has two younger brothers and two younger sisters. He attended Primary School at Dambwa Primary School in Livingstone. After completing his primary school education Tresford was accepted at St Raphael's Secondary School in Livingstone where he schooled for two years from Grade 8 to Grade 9. In 2001, he moved to Ndola, where his father was transferred to by his former employer Zamtel. He started secondary school education at Lubuto High School in Ndola and schooled for three years from Grade 10 to Grade 12.

Tresford had initially applied for Electrical and Electronics at the Copperbelt University (CBU) but because of his interest in Computers, he applied for Computer Studies at the Evelyn Hone College of Applied Art and Commerce. It was while at Evelyn Hone that he developed skill in Computer Programming: Tresford was regarded as the best programmer by his classmates, who would go to him when they had problems in writing Computer programs.

In 2010, Tresford founded XyPNET, a Software Development and Web Hosting Company from his bedroom, growing the company to working for over 200 clients. Tresford has been called the Bill Gates of Zambia as he spends most of his time writing code on his computer.

== College Years ==
By the time he began classes at Evelyn Hone College of Applied Arts and Commerce, Himanansa had already achieved a “reputation as a Computer genius”. During his final year at college, he developed a software program that the college wanted to buy, but for "some reasons", the school didn't buy the program. While at College, Tresford was regarded as the best programmer by his classmates; people used to go to him when they had problems in writing Computer Programs.

== XyPNET ==
After completing college, Tresford founded an Information Technology Company and named it XyPNET. From his first contract he got 2,000 Kwacha, (approximately US$400), and put every coin back into the business. “I didn’t have capital but just an idea. From my first contract, I got K2,000 to put every little thing into the business”.

Due to his leadership ability, the company has seen growth since its inception and has triggered a chain of products and services beyond XyPNET's core web designing and hosting. The company now offers an online productivity software, email hosting, a school management system, computer networking, and a social networking site service (Amunzi). The company's social networking service Amunzi had over 450,000 users as of December, 2013.

== Amunzi ==
Tresford founded Amunzi in June 2011 in his bedroom at his parents’ home in Ndola, Zambia. Tresford is responsible for all operations of the social network and setting the overall direction, product strategy and goals for the social network. He is the main man and leads almost the entire design of Amunzi's service and development of its core features, technology as well as infrastructure.

In 2012, Tresford observed the rise in the number of Features being suggested by the users everyday and after taking some general routines from the structure of the site, he started coding the new Version which he called “Amunzi Reloaded”. On October 24, 2012, he and his team launched Amunzi-reloaded which came with a Package of better and improved new features.

In 2013, Tresford again decided to improve the site and redesigned the social network, this time he called it Amunzi-Amplified.

== Accolades ==
He has been called the Mark Zuckerberg, Bill Gates, Steve Jobs, and Larry Page of Zambia by many media houses in his home country.
