= Amunzi =

African based social networking service

- Amunzi Screenshot, 16 March 2013
- Website type: Social networking service
- Available in: Multilingual
- Owner: XyPNET Limited
- Creator: Tresford Himanansa II
- Registration: Required
- Launched: 24 October 2012; 13 years ago
- Current status: Defunct

Amunzi was an African-based social networking service launched on October 24, 2012, owned and operated by XyPNET Limited. The goal of the site was to unite Africans, make it easier for Africans to meet and learn about their different cultures, people, places etc.

Users were required to register before they start using the site, only then can they create personal profiles, add other Amunzi users to their Communities and exchange private messages, update their Boards by sticking blogs, Photos, Music, Links and asking anonymous questions which other users can answer. The site was similar to other social networks in a way that users receive automatic notifications whenever there are updates from their Community members.

The site's name which was coined by Clive Simanansa, the President of Amunzi, originates from a Bantu word, “Munzi” which means Community, Home or Village depending on which context it is being used.

== History ==
Amunzi was founded by Tresford Himanansa II in June 2011, in his bedroom at his parents’ home in Ndola, Zambia. Tresford, an Evelyn Hone College graduate who was President and C.E.O. of Amunzi's parent company XyPNET (a software development, web designing and hosting company), was responsible for all operations of the site and setting the overall direction, product strategy and goals for the website. He led almost the entire design of Amunzi's service and development of its core features, technology as well as infrastructure.

As of June 2012, Amunzi was the third most visited website in Zambia.

By December 2013, the site had 450,000 users.

== Website ==
=== Features ===
Amunzi had many features common to Social networking sites, such as Photo Sharing, User Groups and many others

- Messaging and Multimedia Sharing

Users were able to exchange private messages on the site. Users can also share Photos, Videos and Music on the site. A user was able to upload a song and share it with their Community members, Videos are hot-linked from YouTube or Vimeo.

- Places

The site featured Places on the site, making it easy for its users to find interesting places as well for Businesses to manage their Presence on the site.

- Hot, Cool, Funny, and Sorry Buttons

With the understanding that a user will not always Like the content that they see on their boards, Amunzi introduced the Hot, Funny, and Sorry buttons to allow users to express themselves in a more convenient manner on the site. The Hot button was only available to Photo Stickers.

- Bible

Users can read and share the bible with their community members and save memory verses. Searching for verses is simplified as members can find verses they do not remember by searching for a particular sentence. Members can also compare verses from different bibles.

- Stickers

Stickers are publicly visible, but Amunzers can restrict the stickers to appear only to selected groups of community members. Users can stick to their Boards via the Amunzi website

- Chat

Amunzi offered online chat, allowing users to chat with other members. Users can also share files and Play Games like Pool, Chess and many others using Amunzi chat. The site also allowed users to save their Conversations to desktop.

- Links

Amunzi users were able to share links to other websites.

- Dictionary

The site allowed its users to make textual references for the English words that they do not understand

== Languages ==
As of April 2013, the website was accessible in 7 different languages (English, Tonga, Bemba, Chewa, Lunda, Lozi and Luvale). The site is set to be available in Swahili to serve all Swahili speaking Nations, like Tanzania, Uganda, Kenya and many others.

== Amunzi Reloaded ==
In 2012, Tresford observed the rise in the number of Features being suggested by the users every day, and after taking some general routines from the structure of the site, he started coding the new Version which he called “Amunzi Reloaded”. On October 24, 2012, he and his team launched Amunzi-reloaded, which came with a Package of better and improved new features.

== Third party login ==
Amunzi users were able to login and make and create an Amunzi profile using their existing Facebook accounts.

== Privacy and security ==
To mollify concerns about the users, Amunzi allowed its users to control who can view their profiles, Stick on their Boards, inbox them as well as who can see them in search results, through their Privacy Settings.
