= Stephen Kappata =

Stephen Chipango Kappata (1936–2007) was a Zambian painter.

Kappata was a native of the Barotseland Protectorate, Western Province, the son of parents from Angola who had fled their homeland during World War I. His home village was Luchazi, while the surrounding area was heavily Lozi; at home he spoke Luchazi while also learning Lozi. He began painting sometime around 1970 after a meeting with an artist who sold depictions of Victoria Falls to tourists. His initial clientele was local, around Mongu; he then went to the United Kingdom for a short time, where he studied film, photography, and illustration prior to returning to his homeland. In 1982 he met the Dane Anna-Lise Clausen, who assisted in the organization of his first solo show, in 1986, at the Mpapa Gallery. He would go on to show internationally for the rest of his career. During his career he lived and worked in Mongu and Livingstone.

Kappata's work has been described as "naive", and his output has been compared to the work of Chéri Samba and Moké. Stylistically his output is distinguished by brilliant colors and a flattened picture plane; figures are invariably depicted in profile. His paintings typically address Zambian culture, colonialism, and various contemporary issues such as AIDS and other social troubles. Three of his paintings are owned by the National Museum of African Art,, and one is owned by Glasgow Life Museums.
