= Zambia National Broadcasting Corporation =

Zambian television and radio station

- Type: Statutory corporation
- Industry: Mass media
- Predecessor: ZBS
- Founded: 1941
- Headquarters: Lusaka, Zambia
- Area served: Africa
- Products: Broadcasting & radio
- Production output: News, public affairs, light entertainment, Sports, religion, education
- Services: ZNBC TV1; ZNBC TV 2 ZNBC TV 3 ZNBC TV 4 ZNBC RADIO 1 ZNBC RADIO 2 ZNBC RADIO 4
- Owner: Zambian public (Government owned)
- Number of employees: 2,000+
- Website: znbc.co.zm

The Zambia National Broadcasting Corporation (ZNBC) is a Zambian television and radio station, formerly state owned, now technically a statutory body but still essentially under government control. It is the oldest, widest, and largest radio and television service provider in Zambia. It was established by an Act of Parliament in 1987, which was passed to transform the Zambia Broadcasting Services from being a Government Department under the Ministry of Information and Broadcasting Services into a statutory body called the Zambia National Broadcasting Corporation.

== History ==
=== Introduction of radio ===
It was not until World War II that Zambia, then Northern Rhodesia, acquired a radio service. In 1941 the Government's Information Department installed a 300 watt transmitter in Lusaka, the capital. Known as Radio Lusaka, this station was built for the purpose of disseminating war-related information. From the outset, the Lusaka station addressed programs to Africans in their own languages, becoming the pioneer in the field of local vernacular broadcasting in Africa. In 1945, Harry Franklin, Director of the Information Department, proposed that Radio Lusaka be developed into a fully-fledged station broadcasting exclusively to Africans. Since Northern Rhodesia could not afford such a specialized service on its own, the administrations of Southern Rhodesia and Nyasaland were persuaded to share in the operating costs, while the British Government agreed to provide capital funds. Thus, the Central African Broadcasting Station (CABS) came into being.

Among the by-products of this effort were the world's most extensive collection of ethnic African music, and a breakthrough in that most formidable barrier to audience growth, the lack of a receiver which Africans could afford to buy. Franklin tried for three years in the late 1940s to persuade British manufacturers that a potential mass market existed among Africans for a very simple inexpensive battery operated short wave receiver, in the era before transistors, before finally persuading a battery company to invest in the research and development of the idea. One of the early models was mounted experimentally in a 9-inch diameter aluminum housing originally intended as a saucepan. Thus was born in 1949 the famous "Saucepan Special", a 4-tube tropicalized short wave receiver. This succeeded even beyond Franklin's expectations. It cost five pounds Sterling, and the battery, which lasted 300 hours, an additional one-pound five shillings. Within the first three months 1,500 of the Saucepan Specials had been sold, and in the next few years, 50,000 sets were imported. Franklin had hopes of capitalising on a world market for the sets, but within a few years the transistor radio came into mass production and so turned his brainchild into a mere historical curiosity.

=== Federation ===
In 1953, the Federation of Rhodesia and Nyasaland was established, with Salisbury, Southern Rhodesia (now Harare, Zimbabwe) as its capital, and the Southern Rhodesian Broadcasting Service, which catered for European listeners, became the Federal Broadcasting Service (FBS). The CABS, still based in Lusaka, continued to use African languages as well as English.

In 1955, a Federal Commission of Enquiry into the organisation of broadcasting in the Federation proposed the creation of a new broadcasting organisation, to be called the "Rhodesia and Nyasaland Broadcasting Corporation", which was to be established in 1956. However, it was not until 1958 that the FBS and CABS would be merged into the Federal Broadcasting Corporation (FBC).

=== Introduction of television ===
In 1961, a television service, which had been introduced in the Salisbury and Bulawayo areas, became available in the Copper Belt of Northern Rhodesia. Operated by Rhodesia Television (RTV), the service's headquarters later moved to Lusaka. In the early 70s, ZBS TV broadcast on three transmitters. In Kitwe, educational programming was carried in the mornings.

=== Independence ===
However, disagreements between the three constituent territories of the Federation led to its break-up in 1964, after which Northern Rhodesia and Nyasaland would gain independence as Zambia and Malawi. The former FBC station in Lusaka became the Northern Rhodesia Broadcasting Corporation, which following independence later that year, was renamed the Zambia Broadcasting Corporation (ZBC). This, in turn, was succeeded by the Zambia Broadcasting Service (ZBS) in 1966. In the same year, the government also took control of television services, with Television Zambia becoming part of the ZBS in 1967. At the end of 1988, the ZBS was replaced by the Zambia National Broadcasting Corporation (ZNBC), a government department under the Ministry of Information, Broadcasting and Tourism.

== Broadcasting services ==
There are three domestic services. Radio 1 is carried over 8 FM transmitters, broadcasting in the seven major languages of Bemba, Nyanja, Lozi, Tonga, Kaonde, Lunda and Luvale. These are used in rotation to ensure a prime time audience for each group. Radio 2 is also broadcast by 8 FM transmitters in English, while Radio 4 is broadcast in English over 5 FM transmitters. The now defunct Radio 3 was the international service. Used mainly by liberation movements in other countries in the region, it closed in 1992, having been considered to have outlived its usefulness.

Programs include news, public affairs, light entertainment, sport, religion and education. School broadcasts are carried during school semesters. Agricultural programs for farmers cover all the country areas. Listening is encouraged by free provision of receivers for farm radio forums, of which there are more than 600. An annual licence fee is payable but many receivers are not licensed.

The principal activity of the corporation is to provide information, entertainment and education to the people of Zambia.

== Journalists ==
Some of the journalists who have worked for ZNBC include:

- ZNBC Lusaka Studios
1. Hector Simfukwe
2. Brian Mwale
3. Masautso Mukwayaya
4. Lucky Phiri
5. Fortune Malata
6. Patricia Banda
7. Joshua Jere
8. Henry Ngilazi
9. Dora Siliya
10. Masuzyo Ndhlovu
11. Claudet Sindaza
12. Musonda Lombe
13. Chansa Kunda
14. Patricia Mapiki
15. Wilson Mulinda
- ZNBC Kitwe Studios
1. Paul Monde Shalala
2. Clinton Masumba
3. Queen Chungu Malama
4. Ravizaria Musakanya
5. Mushota Mpundu
6. Lupindula Mwewa
7. Obinato Saili
8. Chansa Mayani
9. Victor Sakala

== Television programming ==
=== Current ===
==== News ====
- ZNBC News
- TV2 News

=== Former ===
==== International ====
===== Children's =====
- 100 Deeds for Eddie McDowd
- Andy Robson
- Betty's Bunch
- Big Blue Marble
- The Boy from Andromeda
- The Boy Who Won the Pools
- Bozo the Clown
- Byker Grove
- Cyberkidz
- The Huggabug Club
- Hunter's Gold
- H.R. Pufnstuf
- Kaboodle
- Kids Incorporated
- The Kids of Degrassi Street
- Kids TV
- Lamb Chop's Play-Along
- Pinky and Perky
- Press Gang
- Richard the Lionheart
- Sesame Street
- Steel Riders
- Stingray
- The Electric Company
- Thunderbirds
- Woof!

===== Animation =====
- ALF: The Animated Series
- Amigo and Friends
- Atom Ant
- Birdman and the Galaxy Trio
- Bob Morane
- Bozo: The World's Most Famous Clown
- The Care Bears Family
- CBS Storybreak
- Code Lyoko
- Corduroy
- Count Duckula
- Cyberchase
- C.L.Y.D.E.
- Denver, the Last Dinosaur
- DuckTales
- Eckhart
- Fat Albert and the Cosby Kids
- The Flintstones
- Flipper & Lopaka
- Franklin
- The Fruitties
- Ghostbusters
- Godzilla
- Groovie Goolies
- Harlem Globetrotters
- The Harveytoons Show
- Heathcliff
- Heathcliff
- He-Man and the Masters of the Universe
- Highlander: The Animated Series
- Iron Man
- Jackson 5ive
- Jem
- Jonny Quest
- Josie and the Pussycats
- Kid Power
- Kit and Kaboodle
- Laurel and Hardy
- The Littles
- Madeline
- Medabots
- Muppet Babies
- The Mysterious Cities of Gold
- My Favorite Martians
- The New 3 Stooges
- Nilus the Sandman
- The Pink Panther Show
- The Raccoons
- The Road Runner Show
- Roger Ramjet
- Rude Dog and the Dweebs
- Scooby-Doo, Where Are You!
- She-Ra: Princess of Power
- Sinbad Jr. and His Magic Belt
- Space Ghost and Dino Boy
- Speed Racer
- Spider-Man and His Amazing Friends
- Sport Billy
- Supa Strikas
- Team Galaxy
- Thundarr the Barbarian
- Thunderbirds 2086
- Timothy Goes to School
- The Transformers
- Top Cat
- Voltron
- The Woody Woodpecker Show
- Zazoo U

===== Anthology =====
- Hammer House of Horror
- The Wonderful World of Disney

===== Sci-Fi =====
- Earth: Final Conflict
- Seven Days

===== Drama =====
- The Adventures of William Tell
- African Skies
- Airwolf
- The A-Team
- Barrier Reef
- Beastmaster
- Burke's Law
- CHiPS
- Counterstrike
- The Crow: Stairway to Heaven
- Danger Man
- Doctor Who
- Egoli: Place of Gold
- ER
- The Fugitive
- The Greatest American Hero
- Hunter
- Inspector Morse
- Knight Rider
- Lady Blue
- The Long Way Home
- MacGyver
- The Mod Squad
- Queen of Swords
- Run for Your Life
- Shoestring
- Sirens
- Touched by an Angel

===== Documentary =====
- Airport
- All Our Yesterdays
- Man Alive
- Secrets & Mysteries

===== Current Affairs =====
- World in Action

===== Christian =====
- The World Tomorrow

===== Comedy =====
- ALF
- Amen
- Becker
- Better Days
- Bewitched
- The Brady Bunch
- Cosby
- Dad's Army
- Dear John
- Diff'rent Strokes
- Everybody Loves Raymond
- Family Matters
- Fawlty Towers
- The Fresh Prince of Bel-Air
- The Good Guys
- The Goodies
- Hugh and I
- The Hughleys
- In Living Color
- Keeping Up Appearances
- Learning the Ropes
- The Monkees
- Mr. Bean
- The Muppet Show
- My Wife and Kids
- No Place Like Home
- Parenthood
- The Patty Duke Show
- Sidekicks
- Sykes and a...
- Waiting for God
- Yes, Prime Minister

===== Soap Opera =====
- Another Life
- Generations
- Isidingo
- Take the High Road
- Passions
- No One But You
- My 3 Sisters
- Sad Love Story

===== Horror =====
- Werewolf
