= Lily Tembo =

Zambian musician and radio presenter (1981–2009)

- Also known as: Lily T
- Born: Lily Tembo; November 20, 1981; Kabwe, Zambia
- Died: September 14, 2009 (aged 27) Lusaka, Zambia
- Occupations: Musician, songwriter, journalist
- Years active: 1992–2009

Lily Tembo (November 20, 1981 – September 14, 2009), professionally known as Lily T, was a Zambian musician, radio presenter, journalist and charity worker who had won national acclaim with her 2004 debut album Lily T. For this album, she received two awards.

Tembo had released two albums and was working on a third at the time of her death. Aside from singing, she was known for presenting on the 5th FM Radio in Zambia, working as a journalist and involved in charity work.

== Background ==
Tembo was born in Kabwe, Zambia, and was raised in a music-loving family. She was inspired by her father, who played African bongo, and her sisters and mother, who sung in church. Tembo attended secondary school at the Kabulonga Girls High School in Zambia's capital City, Lusaka. Later on, she pursued a career in journalism at Evelyn Hone College.

Tembo emerged onto the music market in 2004 with the album Lily T, which started her career and brought her national attention. She released her second album in 2006. Tembo was also a newsreader for 5th FM radio, a radio station based in Lusaka, Zambia.

After winning one award, she was recognized by BBC Africa as a promising African celebrity who remained original to traditional instruments.

== Charity work ==
Lily had been involved in raising malaria awareness in Zambia. In April 2009, she led worshippers at a world malaria day commemoration in Lusaka.

== Death ==
After complaining over "minor stomach pains" and suffering severe gastritis, Tembo died on September 14, 2009 at the age of 27.

Tembo's sister Patience told the press "She had gastritis, she fell sick on Saturday, started vomiting a lot and developed anaemia. On Monday around 19:00 hours, she died."

== Discography ==
- Lily T (2004)
- Osalila (2006)

== Awards and nominations ==
Year	Award	Category	Result
2005	Koala Awards	Best New Artist	Nominated
2007	Ngoma Awards	Best Female Recording Artist	Won
2007	Ngoma Awards	Best Music Video Award	Won
