= Henry Tayali =

Zambian artist, sculptor, printmaker, and lecturer (1943–1987)

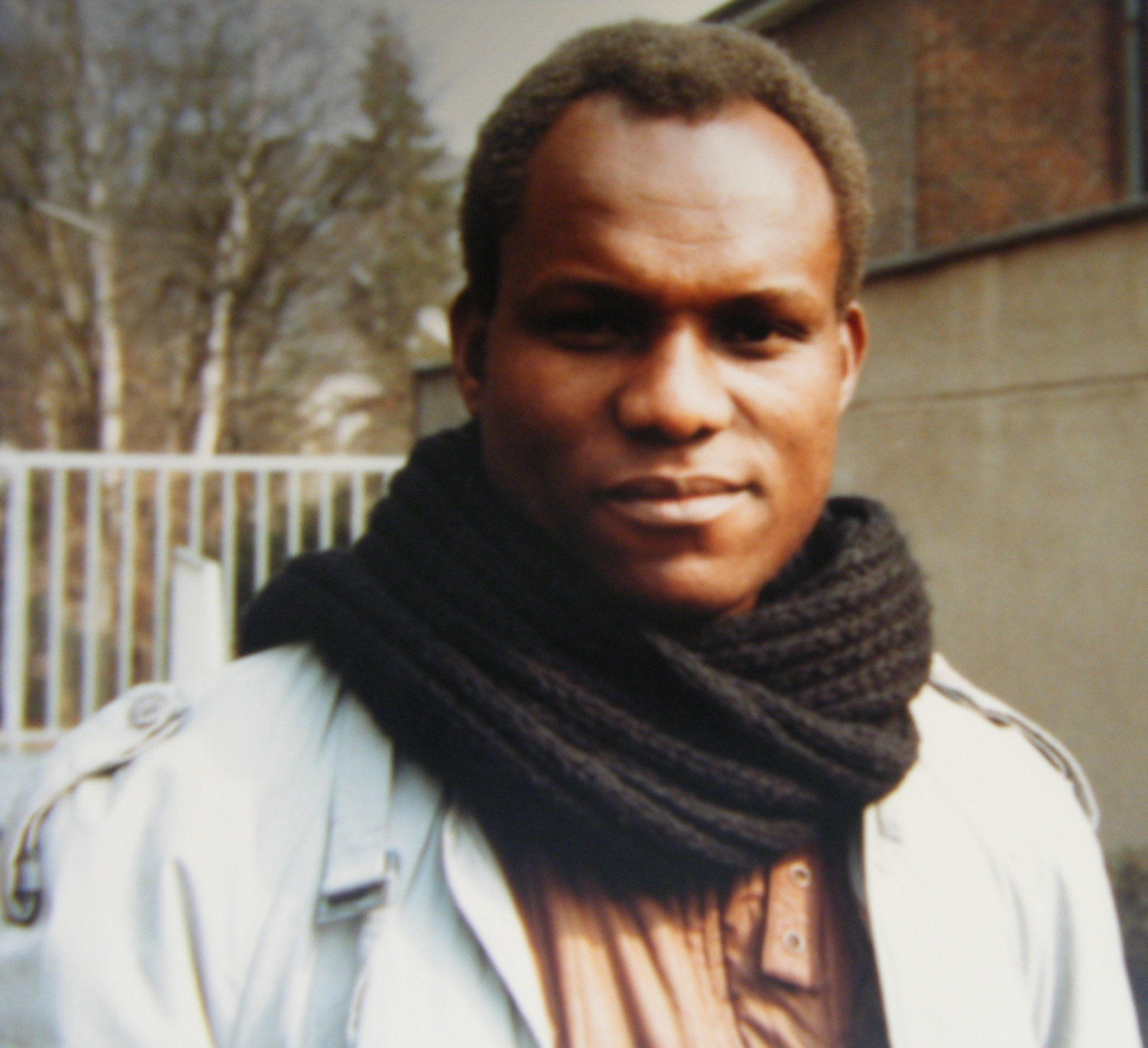
- Henry Tayali, early 1980s
- Born: Henry Nkole Tayali; 22 November 1943; Serenje, Northern Rhodesia
- Died: 22 July 1987 (aged 43); Aachen, West Germany
- Education: B.A. (Fine Art), Makerere University, Uganda; M.A., Kunstakademie Düsseldorf, West Germany
- Known for: Painter, Printmaker, Sculptor, Raconteur, Lecturer
- Notable work: The Graduate, The Bull, Destiny, Mother Afrika

Henry Nkole Tayali (22 November 1943 – 22 July 1987) was a multi-lingual Zambian painter, sculptor, printmaker, raconteur and lecturer. He has been described as Zambia's most famous painter.

== Biography ==
=== Early life ===
Tayali was born on 22 November 1943 to Edward Nkole Tayali (1914–1995) and Esnati Mumba Tayali (née Chola, 1923–1963) in Serenje in the British Colony of Northern Rhodesia (later to become Zambia), a town near the site of the Nsalu 12,000-year-old rock and cave paintings.

=== Education ===
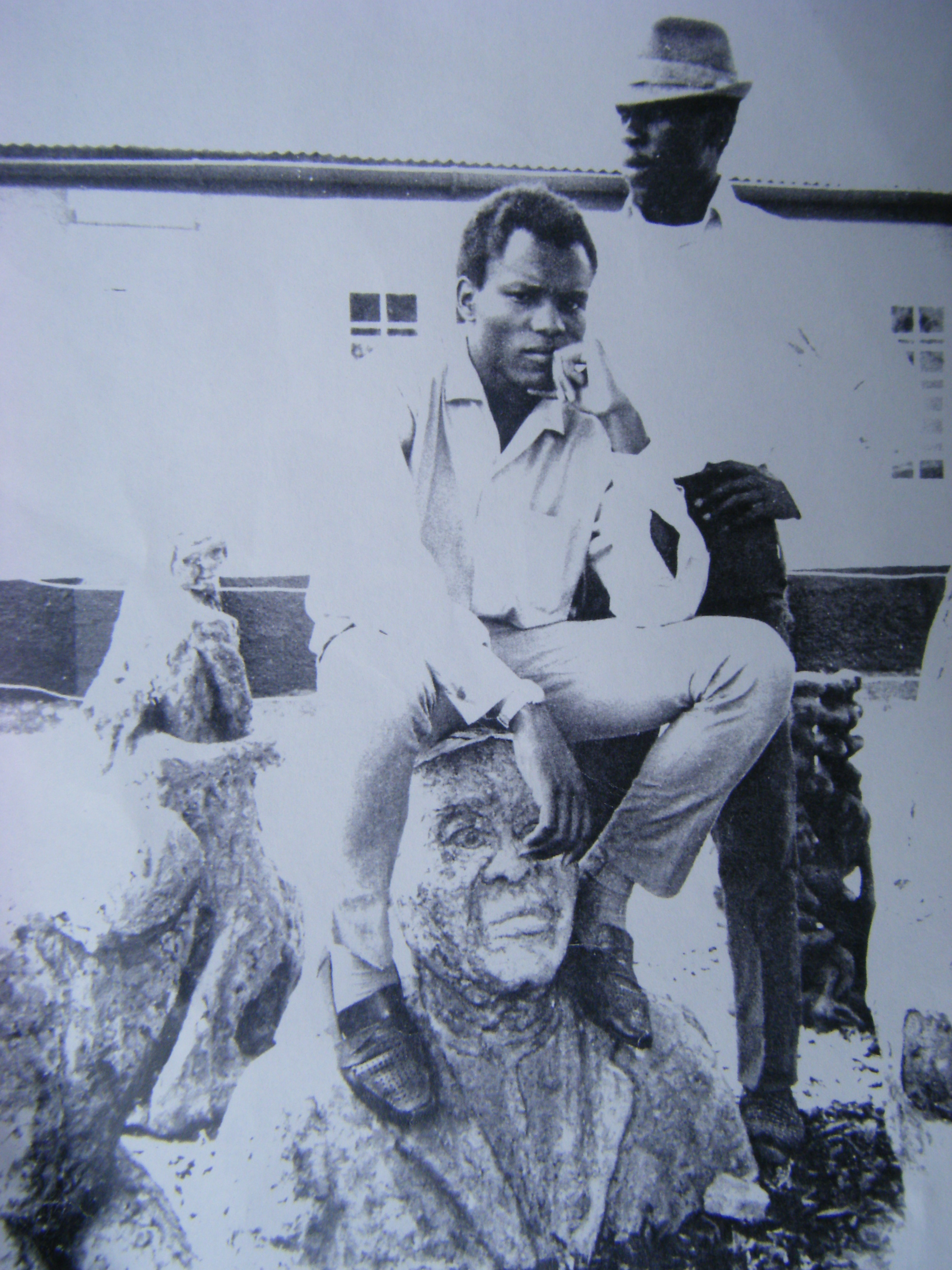
Henry Tayali at Makerere University, Kampala, Uganda

Tayali first started painting while at school in Bulawayo in the late 1950s. He attended secondary school in Bulawayo at Mpopoma High School and during this time produced the work Destiny. The proceeds from the sale of his paintings were held in the Henry Tayali Painting Fund, administered by Trustees who included Eric Gargett and E. H. Ashton. The money in the Fund would be released when Henry was accepted at University (see also).

In early 1967, before his Cambridge 'O' Level Certificate results came out, Tayali left Rhodesia (the Southern was dropped when Zambia gained independence in 1964) for Zambia, and applied for a bursary from the Zambian Government - expressing an interest in Architecture with Art. With help from his father (who went to school at Lubwa Mission in Chinsali in Northern Rhodesia with the likes of Kenneth Kaunda (President of Zambia 1964–1991), Simon Kapwepwe (Vice President 1967–1970), and Wesley Nyirenda and others, and who lobbied the Ministry of Education at Ridgeway in Lusaka on his behalf), he was awarded a Zambian Government scholarship to study at Uganda's Makerere University in Kampala, where he graduated in 1971 with a Bachelor of Arts degree. Shortly after Idi Amin seized power in Uganda, Tayali returned to Zambia and then started work at the University of Zambia where he joined the Institute of African Studies in Lusaka as a lecturer in African art and later as University Artist. In 1972, Tayali got a German Academic Exchange Service (DAAD) scholarship to study for a Masters in Fine Arts at the Staatliche Kunstakademie Düsseldorf, West Germany. Tayali was the first recipient of the DAAD to be selected from south of the equator.

His professor, Gerd Weber, said of him, "Of all the foreign students who have worked in my class, Henry Tayali is by far the most talented of them all. His work constitutes a synthesis between the traditional African art, the tools and techniques of the modern era." (see also).

After graduating in 1975, and fluent in German (in addition to English, Bemba, Ndebele, and Ngoni), he returned to Lusaka to the Institute of African Studies.

In early 1978, Tayali returned to West Germany to embark on a Doctor of Fine Arts degree at the Akademie für Bildende Künste, but the arrangements did not work out and he returned to Zambia bitterly disappointed.

=== Marriage and family ===
In 1971, he married Regina Mary Birungi Kivubiro while still in Uganda, and just before returning to Zambia and they had a son in 1972, Rhodrick Tayali. Regina died in 1976. Tayali had a daughter in 1980, Katwishi Alanda Tayali, followed in 1983 by a son, Chaswe Angio Tayali, with Rosemary Kaluwa, whom he later married. Tayali's son Rhodrick is an artist and interior designer by training and a graduate of the Fachhochschule Aachen, and is also an accomplished artist in his own right.

Tayali died on 22 July 1987 while visiting his eldest son and family friends the Moiks / Moik-Becker in Aachen, West Germany, after attending his youngest brother's wedding in Southampton, England. He was buried at Leopards Hill Cemetery in Lusaka.

=== Career ===
Henry Tayali showing some of his artwork to then Zambian President Kenneth Kaunda, 1972

When the family was in Bulawayo, Tayali's natural talent was spotted early on by Alex Lambeth, who ran the African Affairs Department of Bulawayo City Council. Lambeth encouraged Tayali to pursue art as a career, and enrolled him on an artwork course. This led to Henry's first exhibition in Bulawayo at the age of fifteen. His painting career took off after that, and using water colours, Tayali begun to produce varied, vibrant, dynamic works such as Sunset Road and Destiny. He also produced sculptures, amongst them The Graduate at the University of Zambia campus in Lusaka, as well as silk-screens and woodcuts, a few of these were printed as greeting cards and sold through newsagents and book stores. Tayali held exhibitions in Lusaka, Bulawayo, Aachen, Düsseldorf, London (Commonwealth Institute, 1983), Alberta, and Toronto as well as in Zambia, where a few of his exhibitions were opened by Kenneth Kaunda, the first President of Zambia. He was associated with artists, authors and politicians, including Simon and Cynthia Zukas, Andrew Sardanis (whose property at Chaminuka houses a collection of Tayali's paintings and sculptures amongst others) and American Professor Melvin Edwards at home and abroad, many of them becoming lifelong friends. There were also joint exhibitions and support, such as that provided by the Alliance Francaise.

His works still continue to be exhibited in Zambia and across the world, and his influence carries on at the National Gallery of Zimbabwe. Numerous examples of Tayali's works are held in private collections across the globe.

Tayali was also a keen photographer, having studied photography for his master's degree, and always carried his trusted Leica SLR camera with him wherever he went. On his projects for the university, he produced a huge catalogue of photographs (often developing the prints himself, and having photographic slides made) of artefacts and people, something he worked hard for as a record for posterity. Some of the photographs he took on his field trips around Zambia were turned into postcards.

Other work included efforts to establish a School of Fine Arts in Zambia and numerous field trips within Zambia to record and preserve the arts and cultures of the various tribes for posterity, including audio recordings. He was involved in organising, and part of, the attendance of the Zambian delegation at the Second African Festival of Arts and Culture in Lagos, Nigeria, 1977 (FESTAC'77).

In addition to lecturing at the University of Zambia, Tayali also lectured at the Evelyn Hone College near the city centre in Lusaka.

He was also a restaurant/hotel critic, having travelled extensively all over the world as well as widely within Zambia in that role.

== Works ==
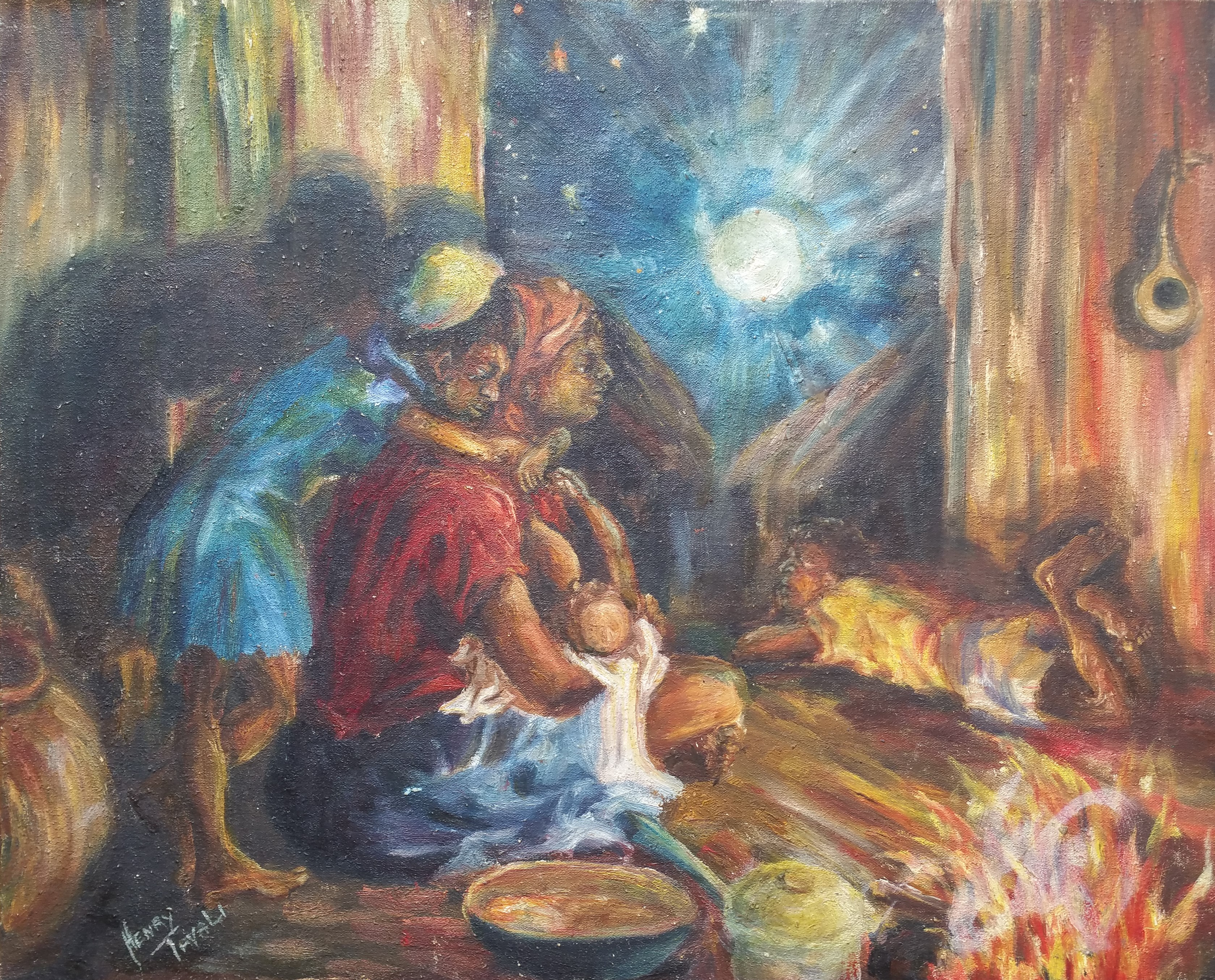
Henry Tayali - Village Scene at Night (early 1960s water colour painting)

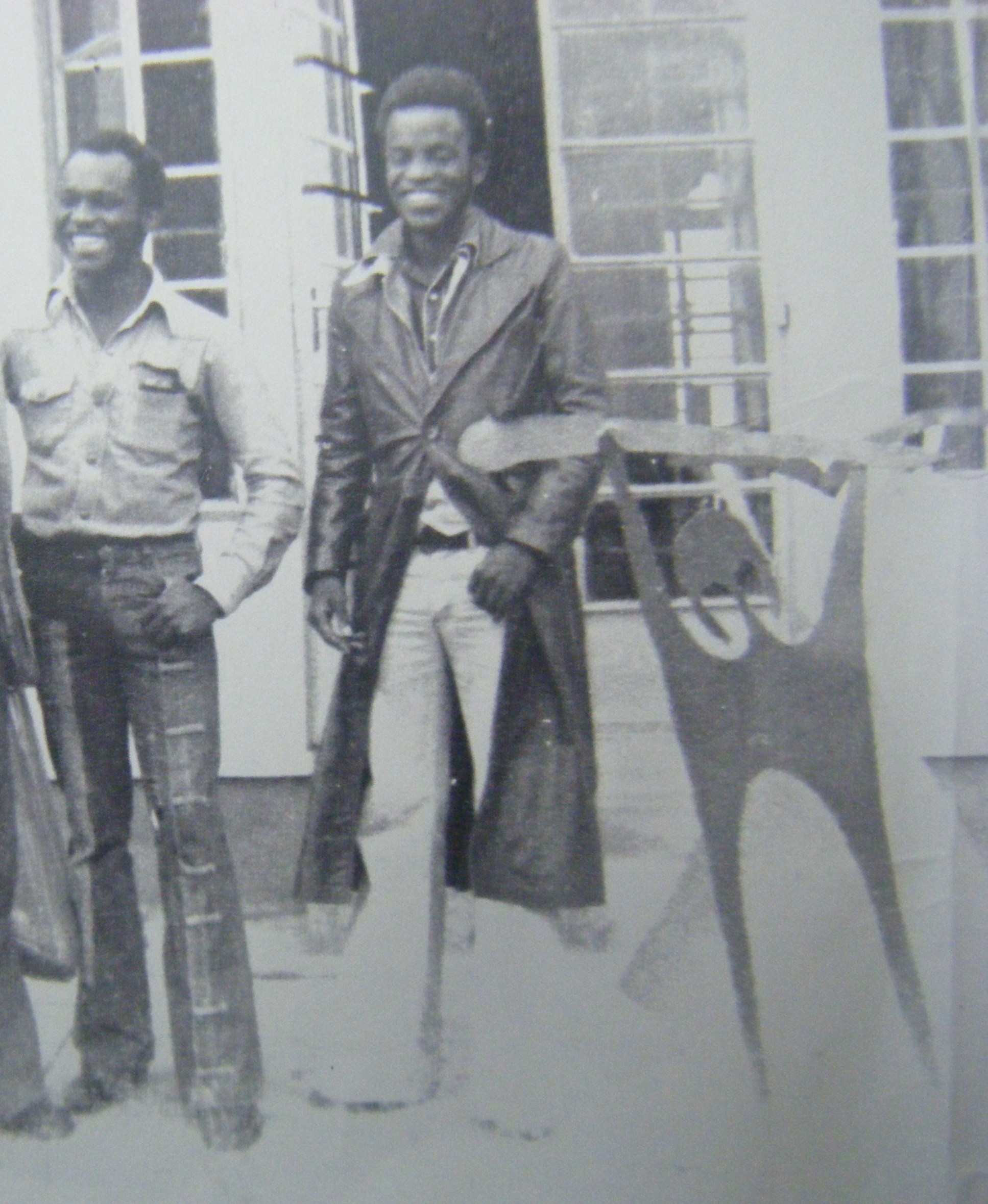
Henry Tayali and his brother Bright Tayali and early metalwork sculptures, Roma, Lusaka, 1976

As a young man, Tayali had started his painting using water colours, producing works of great detail, vividness and vibrancy - his depiction of human figures similar in style to the Italian Renaissance painter Michelangelo (e.g. his watercolours held at the US National Archive: see External links below) - before progressing to oil paintings. His paintings evolved from the fine art style of the late 1950s/1960s/early 1970s, to semi-abstract, through to abstract, and then edging to minimalism at the time of his death. His paintings were distinctive, blending African and Western styles, reflecting the influences on his life.

Tayali's paintings ranged in size from small scale to large wall murals – as in the German Embassy in Lusaka – and very large canvases of more than two metres in length by at least a metre and a half. Often, he would be working simultaneously on four or more paintings at a go, and different prints and sculptures at the same time – all the while with the backdrop of lecturing at the university, or undertaking research in different and remote parts of Zambia (mostly by road), or travelling internationally.

His woodcuts and silk-screens remained largely the same in composition throughout the latter half of his life, and he used them to pass frank comment on the lives of his subjects – the ordinary, common, people of Zambia (and Zimbabwe earlier), particularly the beer gardens with their many characters, their many facets, their rich tapestry of social gatherings and social interactions (see Bier Garten below). Some critics have called some of his works 'crowded social realism'. Equally, he would not leave out depicting his observations of the lone beggar in the street, or the market trader women, or politicians in Africa. He was not averse to using his art to pass comment on any of them.

From a young age, Tayali had always been interested in sculptures and modelling - and he went on to produce sculptures such as The Graduate seen here on the banner of the University of Zambia web-page, at the UNZA Great East Road campus. Funded by donations from the Zambia State Lottery, the Anglo-American Corporation and some individuals, it depicts a graduating student in his flowing gown and mortar board hat, the book in his left hand signifying progress through learning in the modern world, and the hoe in the right hand the hard work and progress through agriculture that has underpinned the country in general. He also produced a huge sculpture of a bird (work in concrete) at the Kapiri Mposhi railway station - the terminus end of the mid-seventies Chinese built Tazara (TAnzania ZAmbia RAilway) railway, whose other end is in Dar-es-Salaam, Tanzania's capital on the Indian Ocean coast. From about 1976, he started working with welded metal sculptures. Initially these were fairly simple as he was new to the medium and its techniques, but by the time of his death they had a majestic complexity to them - probably the most famous example is The Bull, which was mounted on the road to Lusaka International Airport.

His painting Destiny, produced while Tayali was still in school, has been described as "an attempt to express the profound thoughts of a serious young man, about the struggles of Mankind now and in the future" and has been exhibited around the world., see also In 1991, it was purchased by the Lechwe Trust, a charity which supports visual artists in Zambia. Tayali had a close association with the Mpapa Gallery, where his works had often been exhibited.

Speaking of his work in 1979, Tayali said, "My art is concerned with the suffering of the people and I want it to be the echo of that suffering. I see the problems of the continent... I am just recording what I and my people feel, but I do not attempt to provide answers to our problems ".

Writing in 1980, the American academic Bob Barde placed Tayali's woodcut prints on a par with Europe's great printmakers such as Käthe Kollwitz and Théodore Géricault. Tayali's woodcut subjects were usually about the common African man (and woman), and the feelings evoked by his daily travails, and the prevailing political landscape of the times. Barde described his prints as "powerful" and said that he "seems destined to play an important role in modern African art."

On a personal side, with his trademark paint-splattered jeans and majestic walk, he also had a terrific sense of humour to counterbalance his serious approach to work, and this sometimes broke out in - apart from the comments - exaggerated physical attributes on some of his subjects in a few of his works. The art writer, Jean Kennedy said that Tayali's work, "makes strong statements, frequently leavened with humor, about personal and communal tragedies".

== Legacy ==
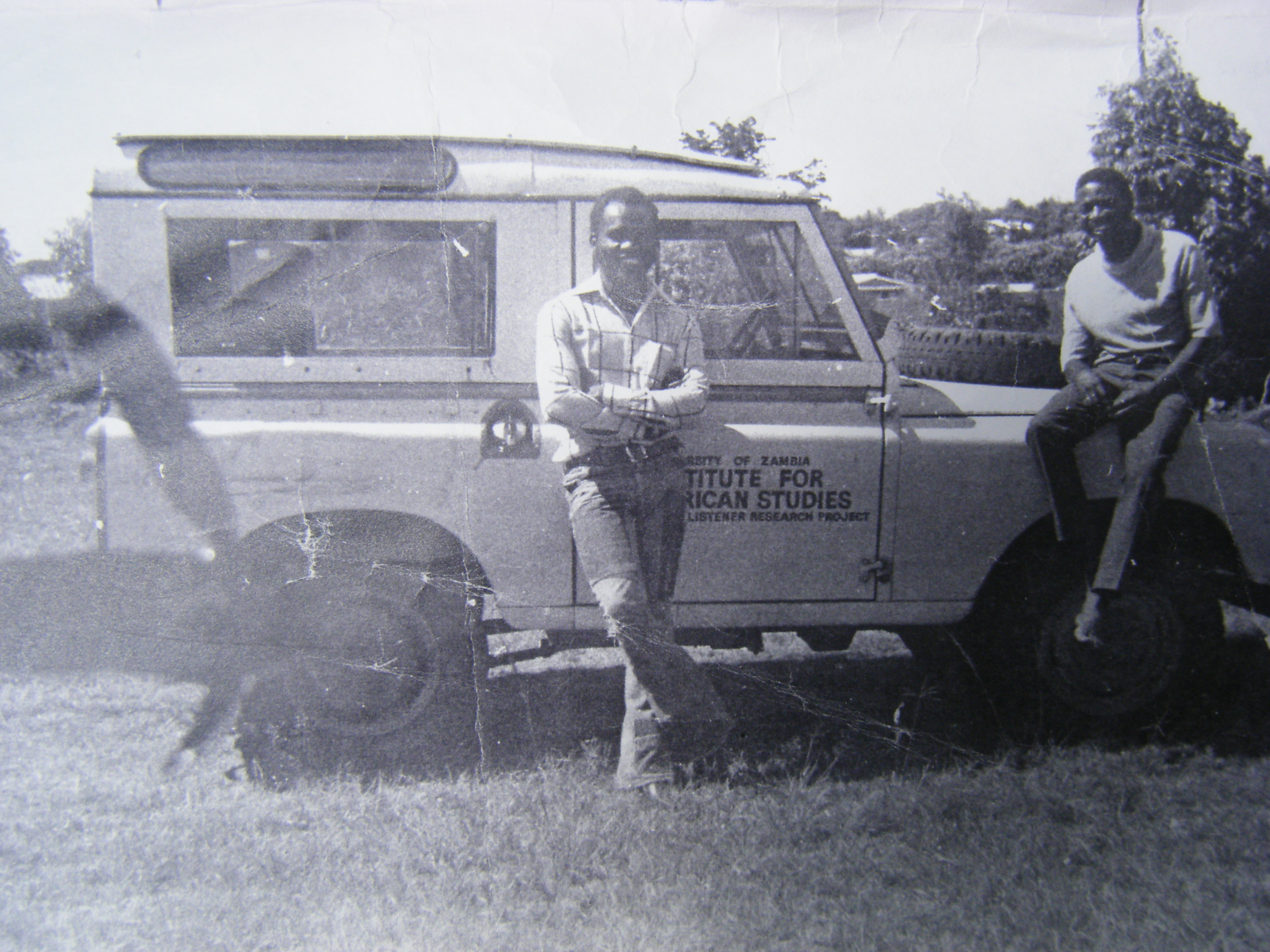
Henry Tayali, with Lungu, Lusaka, 1976

Tayali was one of the first Africans to work tirelessly to raise the profile of indigenous African art and crafts in Zambia, Africa, and the world through workshops, conferences, discussions, exhibitions, newspaper articles, magazines and television appearances.

He played a very pivotal and influential role in cultural and artistic development in Zambia. and Africa. He was president of the International Association of Artists in Zambia (which fell under UNESCO), and represented Zambia at various international symposia and conferences. He also headed the Art Centre Foundation, the National Craft Council of Zambia, and the National Museums Board.

In reflection of his work and legacy, it has been suggested that his work Destiny is a historical piece of art, and not just an eye-catcher.

In 1989, over seventy artists from around Zambia convened at Evelyn Hone College of Applied Arts and Sciences, and formed the Zambia National Visual Arts Council (VAC) in his honour - as the national organisation for visual artists to be run by artists in Zambia. They named its headquarters at the Lusaka Showgrounds "The Henry Tayali Visual Art Centre". The Visual Arts Council started its operations in 1991, but the Visual Arts Centre was officially opened later in 1995. It hosts art competitions, exhibitions, and seminars and it is one of the must-sees on the Zambian tourist circuit. The Ngoma Awards, sponsored by the National Arts Council of Zambia confers the "Henry Tayali Award" for Best Two-Dimensional Visual Artist.

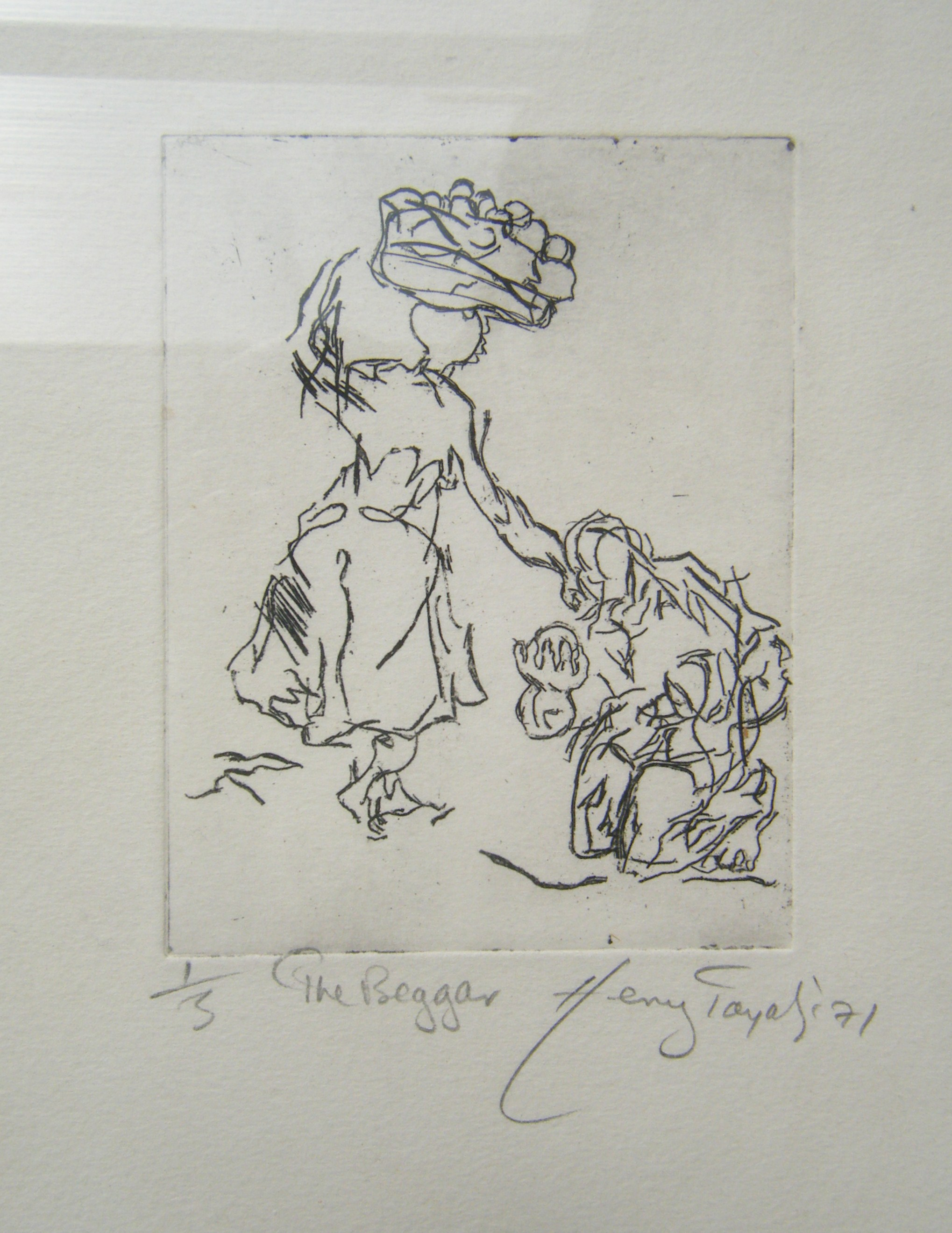
The Beggar, 1971, Woodcut, 1/3

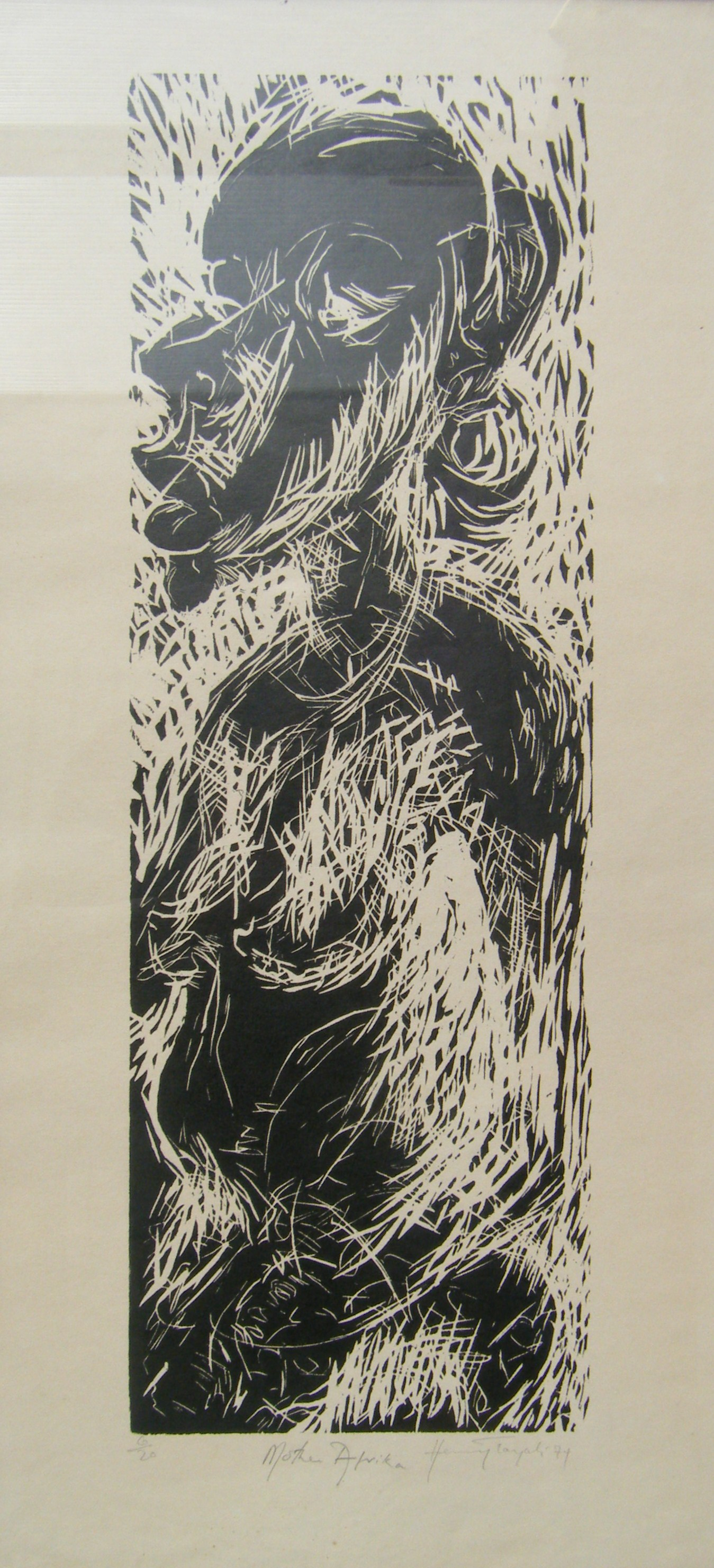
Mother Afrika, 1974, Woodcut, 6/20

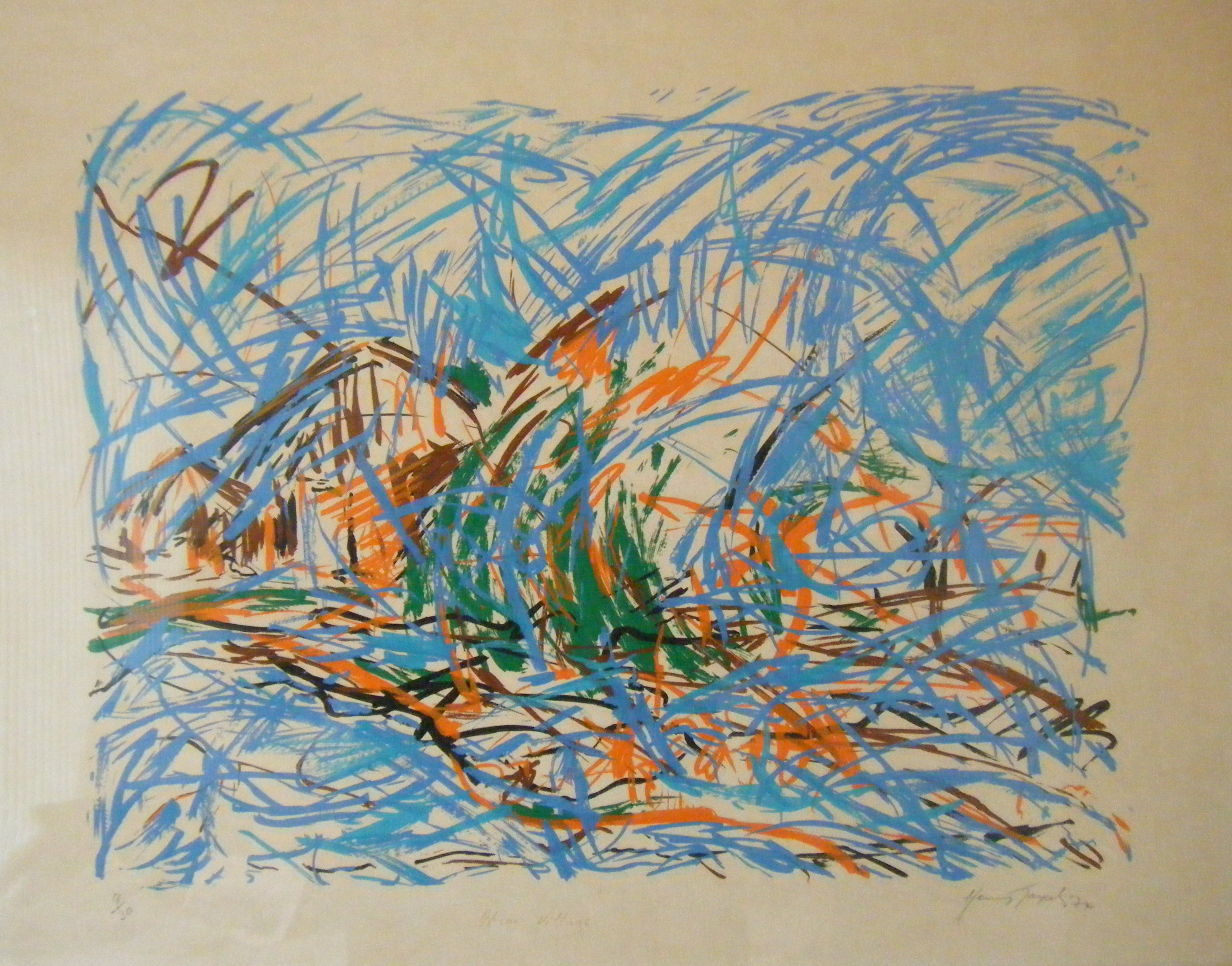
The Village, 1974, Silk screen, 9/30

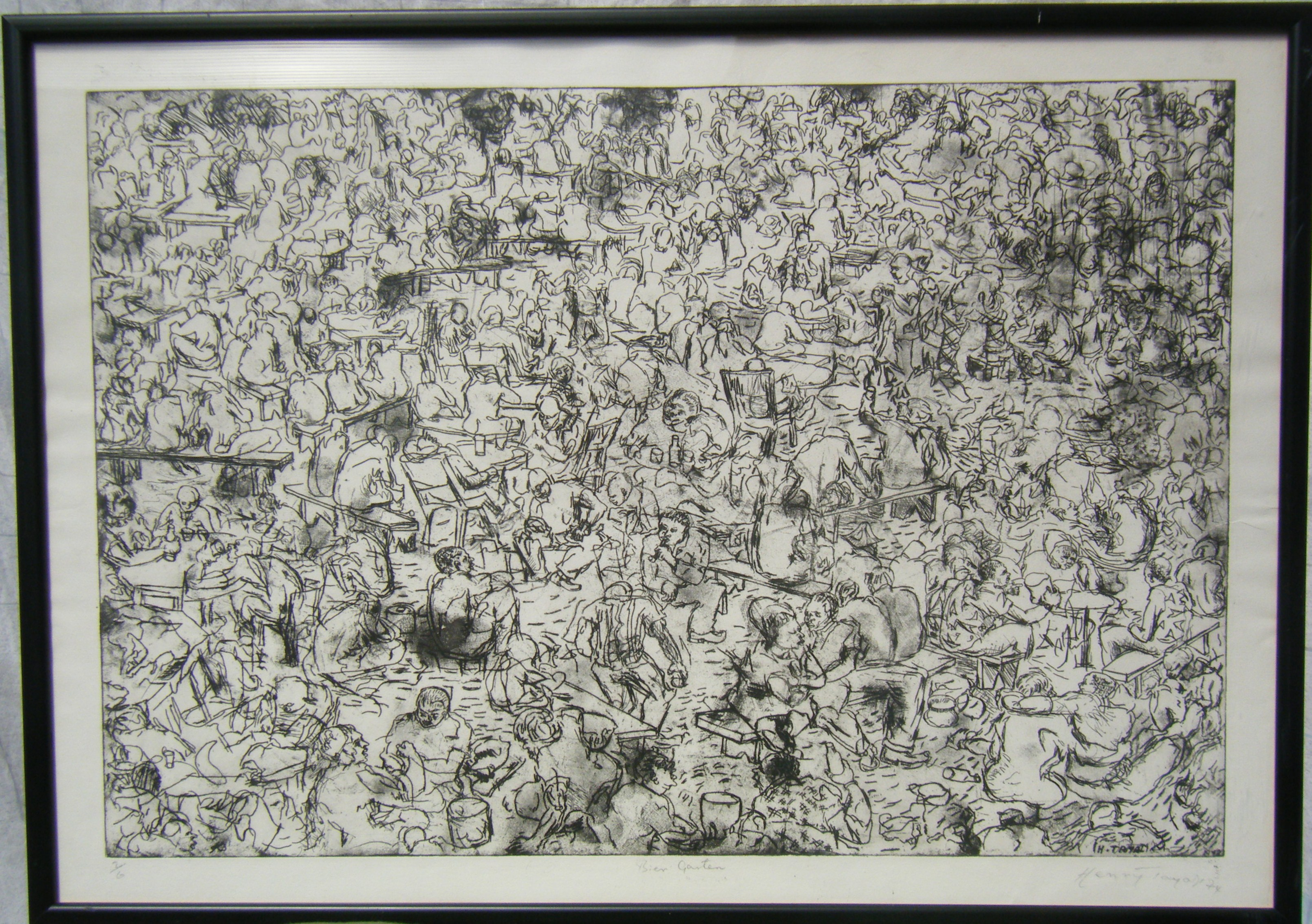
Bier Garten, 1974, Woodcut, 2/6

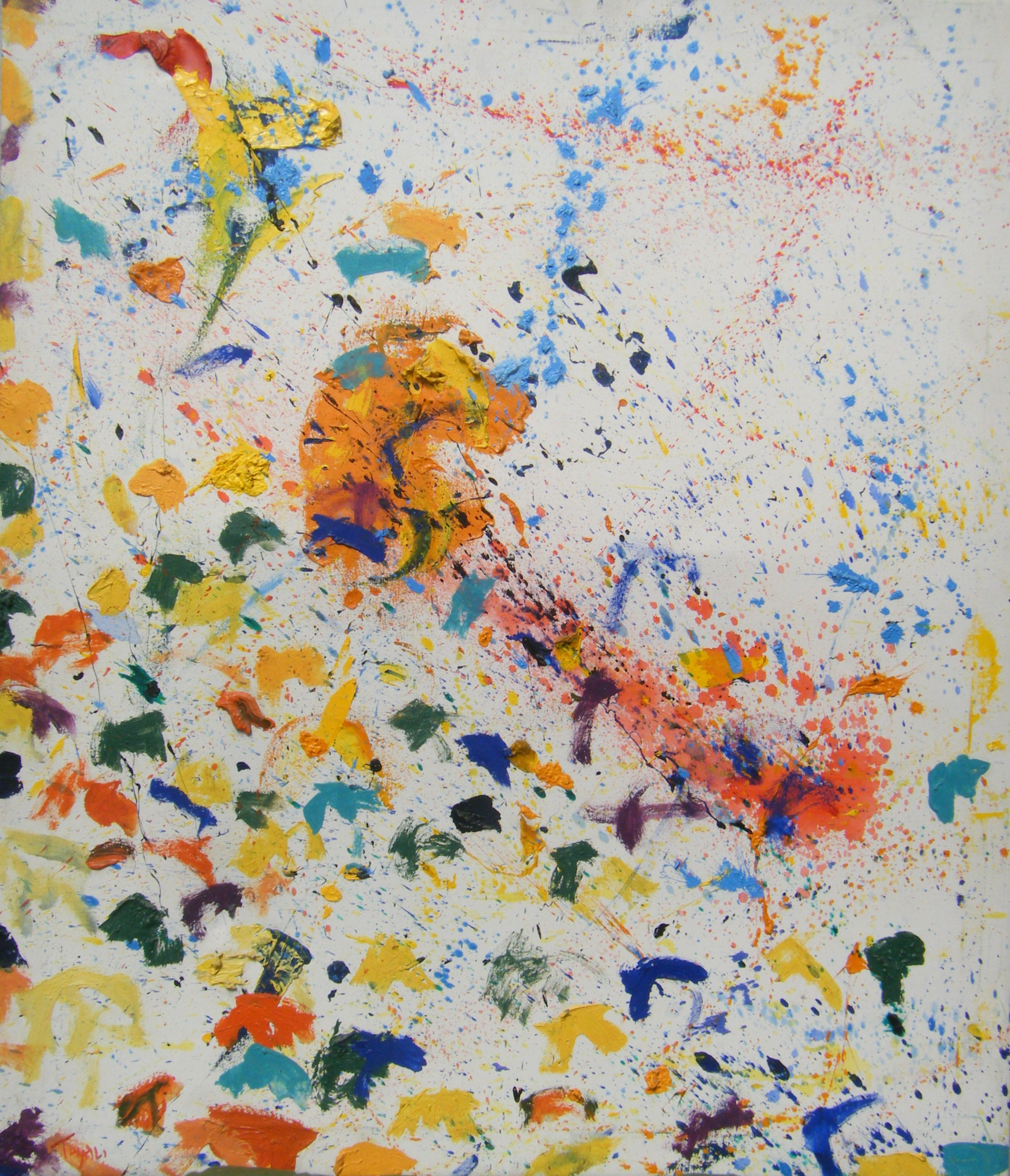
Abstract Painting, mid-eighties
