= Ruth Hartley =

British-French author and artist

Dr. Ruth Hartley is a British-French author and artist.

== Biography ==
Ruth was born on 31 October 1943 to Alfred Stephen London Hartley and to Muriel Mavis Hartley – known as Pixie - (née Burton) in Salisbury (now Harare) in what was the British colony of Rhodesia, now Zimbabwe. Pixie’s family was among the 1820 settlers in South Africa and moved to Rhodesia in 1922 where Ruth's grandfather, Alfred Ernest Hartley bought a farm.

Ruth obtained a BA in Fine Art from the Michaelis School of Art, University of Cape Town in 1964, a PGCE (Art and Design) in 1981 at Trent Park, Middlesex University, and an MA in Women’s Studies (Video dissertation) from Anglia Ruskin University in Cambridge in 1999. She studied at the London School of Economics in 1968, during a period of upheaval. In 2025 Ruth became Dr. Ruth Hartley on gaining a PhD based on her literary and artistic output.

On 4 October 1968 Ruth married Dr. Michael Bush. they moved to Zambia in 1972 where they lived for 22 years. They divorced in 1996. Ruth has four children, Rachma, a Church of England vicar, Tanvir, a novelist, researcher and disabilities activist and author of 'Witchgirl' and 'Cull', Zoe, and Ben, the founder of the Ulemu MMA Academy in Lusaka. Ruth has three grandchildren, one of whom is the political commentator and associate editor at the Financial Times, Stephen Bush.|url=Stephen Bush

Ruth spent her childhood in Zimbabwe before moving to South Africa in the early 60s to study art. After contravening apartheid laws and risking a 7-year prison sentence she had to leave South Africa and sought sanctuary in London.

Ruth has held many exhibitions of her art work, starting in Zambia in 1980, and subsequently in the UK and France. Her painting, The Bombing of Chinkumbi Camp, is in the Zambia National Museum. In 1984 Ruth was invited to become Managing Director of the Mpapa Gallery, founded in Lusaka by Joan Pilcher and Heather Montgomerie as the first gallery in Zambia promoting the work of Zambian artists. Ruth published a monograph on Mpapa Gallery in 2024. She returned to the UK in 1994 to practice and teach art.

Ruth moved to South-West France in 2008 where she lives in a rural village and since 2017 has been married to Dr. John Corley. She continues to write and paint. Her work includes novels, short stories, poetry and memoir, all with an environmental and political flavour. In 2026, Ruth presented a retrospective of her art work, curated by Sana Ginwalla, at the Lechwe Trust Art Gallery in Lusaka.

She has a sister, Clare, and a half-brother, Rick.

== Selected works ==
Year	Title	ISBN-13	Publisher	Notes
2014	The Shaping of Water	978-1-78306-199-0	Matador	A novel set in the Southern Africa liberation wars
2016	The Tin Heart Gold Mine	978-1-78589-876-1	Matador	A novel of conflict, personal and political, set in post-colonial Africa
2016	The White and Black Blues	978-2-9557344-0-7	Atypical Books	A collection of short stories and extracts
2019	When I Was Bad	978-2-9557344-3-8	Atypical Books	A memoir of Ruth's flight from apartheid to Swinging London
2019	The Love and Wisdom Crimes	978-2-9557344-1-4	Atypical Books	A fictionalised retelling of Ruth's coming of age in a time of revolution
2019	The Spiral-Bound Notebooks	978-2-9557344-2-1	Atypical Books	A poetry collection
2021	When We Were Wicked	978-2-9557344-4-5	Atypical Books	A collection of short stories and memoir
2022	Dust and Rain - Chipo and Chibwe Save the Green Valley	978-9982-24-127-4	Gadsden Publishers, Lusaka	Two children in Africa save their parents' home from drought
2024	Mpapa Gallery - A Monograph	978-2-9557344-6-9	Atypical Books	A personal account of the history of Mpapa Gallery, Lusaka, Zambia - 1978 -1996
2026	Work in Progress - Paint, Prose, Poetry and Politics	978-2-9557344-7-6	Atypical Books	A compilation of Ruth's blog posts from 2016 to 2026

== Selected exhibitions ==
- (1980), Ruth Bush, One-Woman Show, Exhibition, Mpapa Gallery, Lusaka
- (1989) Zambia 25 Years on the Frontline, Catalogue, The Africa Centre, London
- (2004), Open Studios, Cambridge, Catalogue, p. 9
- (2005), RaItz, Leper Chapel, Cambridge
- (2007), with Hamera, K., M’Other Art: Fame. God, and Women. Deconstructing Damien Hirst., St Peter’s Chapel, Cambridge
- (2008), with Hamera, K., Finding Fathers New Hall, Cambridge
- (2016), Corpus at Peleyre Gallery, St Lanne, France
- (2026) Unravelling at Lechwe Trust Art Galley, Lusaka
