= Paul Shalala =

Zambian journalist

- Born: 29 August 1984 (age 42); Lusaka, Zambia
- Education: University of Zambia; Evelyn Hone College
- Occupations: Journalist, reporter
- Years active: 2004–present
- Employers: Zambia National Broadcasting Corporation; MUVI Television
- Children: 1
- Website: paulshalala.blogspot.com

Paul Monde Shalala (born 29 August 1984) is a Zambian journalist, blogger, and political analyst specializing on Zambian, African, and world current affairs. He is a reporter for the Zambia National Broadcasting Corporation.

In 2010, he was elected as secretary (Northern Region) for the Zambia Union of Broadcasters. He writes on his blog The Zambian Analyst and on other platforms.

== Early life and education ==
Paul Monde Shalala as a child in the village in 1994.

He spent most of his childhood in Nangoma area of Mumbwa District in Central Zambia. He attended Kasalu Basic School for his primary school and junior secondary school education from 1990 to 1999. He then proceeded to Mumbwa High School where he studied for his Senior Secondary School from 2000 to 2002.

In 2023, he posted a photo of himself in front of a thatched house, a photo that went viral on social media.

Shalala attended the Evelyn Hone College of Applied Arts and Commerce, Lusaka, between January 2004 and 2007 for his Diploma in Journalism, Public Relations and Advertising. He is presently pursuing a Bachelor of Arts Degree in Development Studies with a minor in political science at the University of Zambia's Institute for Distance Education. In 2011, he attended a training workshop on "Reporting Religion" in Lusaka organized by The Media Project. He has also done several specialized journalism training just to sharpen his journalism skills. He has a Certificate in Reporting Politics, Good Governance and Elections from the International Institute for Journalism in Berlin, Germany; Business and Financial Reporting by the Thomson Reuters Foundation in Kampala, Uganda, Advanced Economic and Governance Reporting by the Thomson Reuters Foundation in Johannesburg, South Africa, Energy and Environmental Reporting as part of the Europe-Africa Young Journalists Programme in Addis Ababa, Ethiopia and Investigative Journalism and Anti-Corruption Reporting by the International Anti-Corruption Academy during a week-long course at the West Africa Regional Training Center in Accra, Ghana.

== Journalism career ==
Paul Shalala posing in front of UN secretaries general's portraits in July 2016

Paul Shalala with other Seventh Day Adventist Youth leaders in October 2016

After his college diploma in Journalism, Public Relations and Advertising graduation from Sir Evelyn Hone College of Applied Arts and Commerce, Lusaka, Shalala's first was at the newly opened New Vision Newspaper in Lusaka. He joined the paper in July 2008 at the invitation of his former classmate Bright Mukwasa who was in charge of the newsroom. During this stint, he could walk on foot to cover assignments and go back to the newsroom to submit stories. In the two years at the weekly newspaper, Paul rose from reporter to News Editor.

In March 2010, Shalala then joined Zambia's leading private television broadcaster, MUVI TV, as a reporter and it was there that he honed his journalism skills. At MUVI Television, he gained interest in political news and analysis. This led to the biggest television station in Zambia taking notice of his skills and style. It was at MUVI TV he became a weekly analyst on breakfast shows and occasionally appeared on the 18:30 main news to give analysis on some political developments in the country. He also made his name when he covered the 2011 campaigns and elections with frequent travels with then opposition Patriotic Front leader Michael Sata across the country for the television station. On 14 January 2011, Paul was the only TV journalist to have covered the Mongu riots where a number of people died at the hands of the Police during separatist riots. He left MUVI TV in February 2012 and became a freelance journalist. He has also written for The Media Project and The London Evening Post. He was also doing some consultancy for the Media Institute for Southern Africa (MISA) Zambia Chapter.

Paul Monde Shalala covering the 2011 election campaigns in Luena, Western Province.

On 3 September 2012, Paul joined the Zambia National Broadcasting Corporation (ZNBC) as news reporter and he was deployed at TV2 where he reported on community news stories. The following year, he was transferred to TV1 where he covered more of politics and parliament. In April 2015, Paul was transferred to ZNBC's northern bureau which is based in the mining town of Kitwe. He then switched to reporting on mining, the environment, community news and politics.

His blog The Zambian Analyst has won him several local and international media awards in the past four years. Including the ASACC with Godfrey Chikumbi in 2022. Shalala has also worked with international media organisations, including the BBC Africa Service, London Evening Post and South Africa's talk radio Radio 702 as a contributor. Moreover, he has featured regularly on a number of radio and television stations in Zambia as an analyst discussing political and economic developments in the country.

== Awards and recognition ==
- April 2014 he won the first prize in the TV category in the Policy Monitoring and Research Center (PMRC) Awards for his stories and analysis of the constitution making process.
- On 14 November 2014 he received the second prize in the 2014 Africa Fact Checking Media Awards in Nairobi, Kenya . The story can be seen on YouTube: ( Paul Monde Shalala (17 February 2014). YouTube title: A Feature on the Impact of Mining on Food Security in Zambia (Video). Zambia: African Story Challenge. Event occurs at 0:00–7:23.)
- In 2014 he was one of the finalists in the $1 million African Story Challenge, a programme of reporting grants to encourage innovative, multi-media storytelling that aims to improve the health and prosperity of Africans.
- On 18 December 2014 he won the Best Innovation Award at the 2014 ZANEC Media Awards in Lusaka for a story he wrote on his blog about the use of social media by educators in Zambia.
- He received the 2016 Mandela Washington Fellowship, which he used to finance his studies at Syracuse University in New York.
- On 5 March 2019, Paul Shalala was awarded the prestigious 2019 Jamal Khashoggi Award for Courageous Journalism in its first iteration. The award is named after Jamal Ahmad Khashoggi, a Saudi Arabian dissident, author, columnist for The Washington Post, and a general manager and editor-in-chief of Al-Arab News Channel who was assassinated at the Saudi Arabian consulate in Istanbul on 2 October 2018 by agents of the Saudi government. The award is administered by the Texas (USA) based non-governmental organisation – Inti Raymi Fund, a global human rights foundation, and it is given to journalists who demonstrate exemplary courage in the line of duty. Shalala's award was given in recognition for the series of stories he covered on the youth criminal gangs on the Copperbelt which groupings like the Tokota Boys; 70 Niggas; The Hundreds, and the Mbwambwambwa.

== Personal life ==
Shalala is married and has two sons and a daughter.
