= Dickson Jere =

Zambian lawyer and journalist

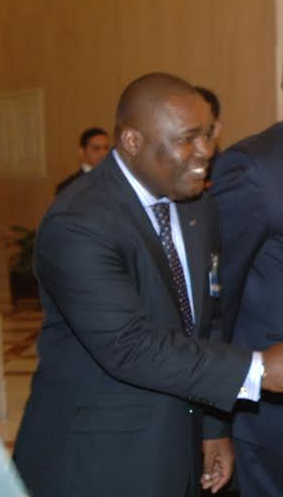

Special Assistant to the President for Press and Public Relations
- In office November 2008 – 28 September 28, 2011
- President: Rupiah Banda
- Preceded by: John Musukuma
- Succeeded by: George Chellah

Personal details
- Born: Dickson Jere
- Party: MMD/Patriotic Front (before 2026); United Party for National Development (2026)
- Profession: Journalist

Dickson Jere is a Zambian lawyer, journalist, author and political analyst specialising on African affairs. He previously served as senior advisor and spokesman of Zambia's fourth President, Rupiah Banda. He has also sat on a number of government committees dealing with the economic sector of the country.

Jere is a lawyer and advocate of the High Court for Zambia, having obtained an LLB degree from the University of Zambia and a Bar Practising Certificate from the Zambia Institute of Advanced Legal Education (ZIALE). Jere is a double master's degree holder; he holds a Master's In Intellectual Property (MIP) from Africa University in Zimbabwe and another Master of Laws Degree (LLM) in human rights from University of Lusaka. He is an associate in the law firm, Mvunga Associates, where he specializes in litigation, business advisory and general counsel. As a practising lawyer, he has played various roles as an official, lawyer and adviser in various issues concerning mining in Zambia and other Southern African countries. He has represented a number of mining companies on wide range of issues that includes energy, taxation, environment and disputes arising from development agreements with governments and is also a practising arbitrator and member of the Chartered Institute of Arbitrators (UK) and a member of the Law Association of Zambia.

== Journalism career ==
After finishing his diploma in journalism, public relations and advertising graduation from Evelyn Hone College of Applied Arts and Commerce in Lusaka, Dickson Jere joined Zambia's The Post, as a reporter in the mid-1990s. Jere worked with international media organisations, including the Agence France Presse (AFP), BBC Africa Service, Radio France International (RFI), Africa Confidential, African Energy and South Africa's talk show Radio 702 where he regularly featured as a political commentator. Moreover, he has featured regularly on a number of radio and television stations in Southern Africa as an analyst discussing political and economic developments in the region.

== Constitution Review Commissioner ==
In 2003, President Levy Patrick Mwanawasa appointed Jere as a commissioner on the commission tasked to draft the country's constitution. Prior to his appointment, Jere had served as president of the Media Institute of Southern Africa (MISA) Zambia as well as board member of the Media Trust Fund. He also worked as lead consultant for the Access to Justice Program under the Ministry of Justice in Zambia where he was in charge of establishing a public relations wing and other customer care programs for the country's judiciary. Additionally, he worked as media adviser for the United Nations Economic Commission for Africa (Southern Africa regional office) as well as media liaison officer for the European Union Electoral Observation Mission to Zambia in 2001.

== Work at State House ==
In November 2008, Jere was appointed by President Rupiah Banda to serve as chief analyst at State House in charge of press and a year later he was promoted to the position of special assistant to the president for press and public relations.

== Professional memberships ==
Currently, Jere is a member of the Law Association of Zambia and the Media Institute of Southern Africa (MISA). He also sits on the Human Rights Committee of the Law Association of Zambia. In March 2018, Dickson Jere was elected as the honorary secretary of the Chartered Institute of Arbitration (Zambia) at the annual general meeting.

== Personal life and education ==
Jere grew up in the city of Lusaka and attended Sir Evelyn Hone College of Applied Arts and Commerce, Lusaka, for his Diploma in Journalism, Public Relations and Advertising. He later studied for his Bachelor of Laws degree at the University of Zambia shortly before he was appointed as a press aide at State House.

He holds the Master's In Intellectual Property (MIP) from Africa University in Zimbabwe and another Master of Laws degree (LLM) in Human Rights from University of Lusaka. On March 14, 2014, Jere was admitted to the bar after passing a Legal Practitioners Qualification Examination (LPQE) at the Zambia Institute of Advanced Legal Education.

== Bibliography ==
In 2014, Jere published his book Inside the Presidency: The Trials & Tribulations of a Zambian Spin Doctor which received many reviews and wide coverage in the Zambian media as well as abroad. As a result of the book, Jere was involved in a number of book signing sessions and presentations.

Inside the Presidency: the Trials and Tribulations of a Zambian Spin Doctor is a chronicle of the goings-on at the centre of state power as told by an insider. It captures the intrigues at the presidency, specifically associated with the author's time serving retired President Rupiah Banda.

The book “inside the presidency” won the 2018 Tell Your Own Story Award for Zambian books.

=== Publications ===
- Jere, Dickson (2014). Inside the Presidency: The Trials & Tribulations of a Zambian Spin Doctor. United Kingdom: Nsemia Inc. ISBN 978-1926906362.
