= George Chellah =

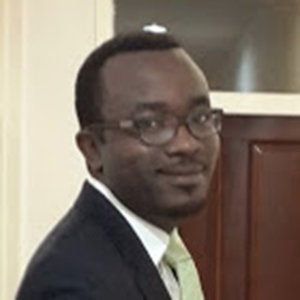

Special Assistant to the President for Press and Public Relations
- In office September 28, 2011 – January 22, 2015
- President: Michael Chilufya Sata
- Preceded by: Dickson Jere
- Succeeded by: Amos Chanda

Personal details
- Born: George Mwenya Chellah; December 26, 1974 (age 51) Kitwe, Zambia
- Party: United Party for National Development
- Profession: Journalist
- Website: State House Press Office - Zambia

George Chellah (born December 26, 1974) was the Special Assistant to the President for Press and Public Relations, the official title of the State House spokesperson, or press aide to the President of the Republic of Zambia. Prior to his appointment as State House spokesperson in 2011, Chellah was Assistant News Editor at The Post, Zambia's leading daily tabloid. He also served as a member of the Press Freedom Committee, a non-profit making advocacy for media rights and freedoms founded by The Post Newspapers

== Journalism career ==
After his Diploma in Journalism, Public Relations and Advertising graduation from the Evelyn Hone College of Applied Arts and Commerce, Lusaka, George Chellah joined Zambia's leading daily, The Post, as a reporter in September 2004.

== Work in Michael Sata administration ==
On September 28, 2011, George Chellah left the private sector to join the public service when he was surprisingly called upon by President Michael Chilufya Sata, on his election into office, to serve as his Special Assistant for Press and Public Relations.

== Personal life and education ==
Chellah born and was raised in Zambia, His home town is Mbala in Northern Zambia, completed his Grade 12 in 2000. A graduate with a Bachelor of Arts Degree with a major in Communication Studies, Chellah also attended Sir Evelyn Hone College of Applied Arts and Commerce, Lusaka, for his Diploma in Journalism, Public Relations and Advertising (2001–2003).

He is happily married and lives in Lusaka with his wife and four Children and two other step children.
