= Evelyn Hone College =

Education organization in Lusaka, Zambia

- Motto: Knowledge With Integrity
- Type: Public
- Established: October 14, 1963; 62 years ago
- Administrative staff: 270
- Students: 7,000
- Location: Lusaka City, Zambia; 15.41687°S 28.288467°E
- Website: http://evelynhone.edu.zm
- Location in Zambia

The Evelyn Hone College of Applied Arts and Commerce is the largest of the Technical Education and Vocational Training (TEVET) institutions under the Ministry of Higher Education in Zambia.

== Information ==
Originally known as the Evelyn Hone College of Further Education, the college was officially opened in October 1963, by Evelyn Dennison Hone, the last Governor of Northern Rhodesia.

The college is currently run by a management board in accordance with the provisions of the TEVET Act No. 13 of 1998.

Mission - To provide quality training in applied arts, commerce, science, and technology in order to increase the pool of highly skilled personnel, enhance their employability, and contribute to economic diversification.

== Organization ==
Evelyn Hone College is divided into four faculties:

=== School of business studies ===
- Business Administration
- Computer Studies
- Information Technology
- Human resource management
- Accounting(Acca & Zica)
- Public administration
- Purchasing and supply
- Marketing
- Industrial engineering
- Literature and Language
- Social Work

=== School of Health & Sciences ===
- physiotherapy
- Radiography
- Lab Tech
- Biomedical science
- Diagnostic and ultra sound
- Biomedical engineering
- Environmental Health

=== School of Media ===
- Journalism and Public relations
- Creative digital art

=== School of Education and art ===
- Music
- English

== Alumni ==
- Eddie Amkongo
- George Chellah
- Tresford Himanansa II
- Dickson Jere
- Godfrey Miyanda
- Mulenga Mulenga
- Henry Joe Sakala
- Paul Shalala
- Lily Tembo
- Agnes Yombwe
