= Stary Mwaba =

- Born: 1976 (age 49–50); Chingola, Zambia
- Education: Zambia National Visual Arts Council Academy (2002–2005); Rhodes University (MFA)
- Known for: painting, installation, sculpture, video
- Notable work: Chinese Cabbage (c. 2011–2015); Space Project (2015); DKALO-1 (2015); Black Mountain (2019–2025)
- Style: Socio-political, archive-based painting and installation
- Awards: Commonwealth Arts and Crafts Award (2005); Zambia National Arts Council Award; KfW Stiftung fellowship (2014–15)

Stary Mwaba (born 1976) is a Zambian visual artist who works in painting, installation, sculpture and video. His work draws on archival research and personal narratives to address Zambian history, the country's copper-mining economy and Chinese commercial involvement in Zambia. He is based in Lusaka and keeps a studio in the Copperbelt.

== Early life and education ==
Mwaba was born in Chingola in 1976. He grew up in the Copperbelt, including several childhood years in Kitwe, and comes from a mining family: according to the BBC his great-grandfathers and one grandfather worked underground and his father worked on the surface. After his father's death in 1994, he moved to Kasama in Northern Province. Before taking up art, he worked as an HIV/AIDS counsellor. He received a diploma from the Zambia College of Agriculture Sciences in 1998.

Mwaba is largely self-taught, he learned painting techniques and materials in the studio of Zambian artist Lutanda Mwamba through the Rockston Studios apprentice programme. He later completed a Masters in Fine Arts at Rhodes University in Makhanda, South Africa where he was a part of the university's Arts of Africa and Global South research programme. There Mwaba researched African and Chinese encounters with Ruth Simbao, Zhange Lifang and Hu Binjun.

== Career ==
=== Early work and residencies ===
Mwaba's early solo residencies were held in Port of Spain (2005), Lusaka (2008 and 2012) and Johannesburg (2009). His residencies include Caribbean Contemporary Arts in Trinidad and Tobago, Robert Wilson's Watermill residency in New York (2010) and the Accra residency programme of the Centre for Contemporary Art, Lagos (2013)

=== Life on Mars (2015) ===
In 2014–15, Mwaba held a twelve-month KfW Stiftung fellowship at Kunstlerhaus Bethanien, Berlin which ended with the solo exhibition Life on Mars (6–29 March 2015). The main installation, Space Project, drew on archival research into Edward Makuka Nkoloso's 1960s Zambian space programme and included the sculpture DKALO-1, based upon Nkoloso's capsule design.

=== Black Mountain (2019–2025) ===
Upon returning to Zambia in 2015, Mwaba turned to the communities living next to the Copperbelt's mining slag heaps known as "black mountains". His 2019 MFA exhibition Black Mountain examined Chinese involvement in Zambian mining through the experiences of his family. A 2025 exhibition at the Lusaka National Museum showed portraits of young informal miners at Kitwe and residents of nearby Wusakile, painted on perforated newspaper pages and developed through community workshops. In its coverage the BBC described Mwaba as on of Zambia's leading visual artists.

== Awards and fellowships ==
- Commonwealth Arts and Crafts Award (2005)
- Zambia National Arts Council Award
- KfW Stiftung, Künstlerhaus Bethanien, Berlin (2014–15)

== Collections ==
- ARAK Collection
