= Milumbe Haimbe =

Zambian painter and digital illustrator (born 1974)

- Born: 1974 (age 51–52); Lusaka, Zambia
- Occupation: Painter
- Known for: digital illustrator

Milumbe Haimbe (born 1974) is a Zambian painter and digital illustrator. Her work portrays black women as superheroes.

== Early years and education ==
Haimbe was born in Lusaka, Zambia in 1974. She attended the Copperbelt University and graduated with a bachelor's degree in Architecture. Haimbe obtained a master's degree in Fine Arts from the Oslo National Academy of the Arts in Norway.

== Career ==
With inspiration from superheroes and the lack of black and female characters in comics, Haimbe created a graphic novel titled The Revolutionist, which features a female protagonist called Ananiya. The novel addresses issues like racism and same-sex love.

She is known to have exhibited her work in numerous shows both locally and internationally, including at FOCUS 10 – Art Basel in Switzerland, at the Smithsonian in Washington, D.C., and the Dak'Art Biennale in Senegal. Other locations where her work has been exhibited include New York, Switzerland, South Africa and Norway.

In 2015, Haimbe was named an Artist in Residence at the Smithsonian Institution in Washington, D.C.

== Awards ==
- 2015 – Bellagio Arts Fellowship Award
- 2015 – Smithsonian Artist Research Fellowship Award
