= Mulenga Mulenga =

Zambian writer, painter, sculptor and photographer

Mulenga Jestina Mulenga
- Born: 1987 (age 38–39); Lusaka, Zambia
- Occupation: Painter

Mulenga Jestina Mulenga (born 1987) is a Zambian painter, writer, sculptor and photographer.

Mulenga is a freelance female artist on the Zambia Art scene. She has been practicing her artistic on a professional level since 2009. Mulenga is a painter, sculptor, writer and photographer. She holds an Art & Design Diploma from Evelyn Hone College of Commerce and Applied Arts. She also has a particular interest in art administration, and currently she is a committee member of the Insaka International Artists Trust (IIAT) and works in the Insakartists Office. Her works can be easily be identified by the palette knife marks and the use of raw colours. Currently she is practising her artistic skills at the Art Academy Without Walls (AAWW) Studio in Lusaka, Zambia.

== Early years and education ==
Mulenga was born in 1987 in Lusaka, Zambia. She attended the Evelyn Hone College of Applied Arts and Commerce where she acquired a diploma in Art and Design. She became an Asiko International School Alumni under CCA Lagos in 2015 and in 2016, she attended the summer school at International Summer Academy of fine Arts in Salzburg, Austria.

== Career ==
Mulenga's work spans multiple media, including painting, sculpture, photography, installation and performance. She began her professional career in art in 2009, and currently works at the Art Academy Without Walls (AAWW) Studio in Lusaka, Zambia.

Her work explores contemporary and historical portrayals of black women's bodies in the setting of post-colonial Zambia, including how societal roles and identities are perpetuated and strengthened at every phase of life.

She is a committee member of the Insaka International Artists Trust (IIAT) and a member of Triangle International Network Trust. Her works are characterised by the palette knife marks and the use of raw colours. She has exhibited her work both locally and internationally, including at Tupelo International Artists Workshop Exhibition in Cape Town, Dak’Art Biennale and Gallery of Small Things both in Senegal. Other locations where her work has been exhibited include Seychelles, Zimbabwe and South Africa.

She was named an Artist in Residence at Grassworks. In 2019, she won the Ngoma Award for Most Outstanding Female Visual Artist.
