= Zambia National Visual Arts Council =

The Zambia National Visual Arts Council (VAC) is a national Zambian visual arts organisation established in 1989. Founded and led by artists themselves, VAC works to promote awareness of the arts and the interests of artists in Zambia.

VAC's founder members included Martin Abasi Phiri, Agness Yombwe, and William Miko, who formed VAC's first interim national executive committee.

The Visual Arts Council's offices are at the Henry Tayali Visual Arts Center in Lusaka. However, the Council has supported exhibitions in a variety of other Zambian venues: for example, the Martin Phiri Art Centre in Chipata, and the Garden City Mall in Lusaka. It has also participated in international collaborations: in 2018 Zambian art was showcased at the African Studies Gallery in Tel Aviv, and in 2020 'Stories of Kalingalinga' was a touring exhibition in collaboration with Anglia Ruskin University in the United Kingdom.

In 2004 VAC produced the book Art in Zambia, written by Gabriel Ellison with photography by Billy Nkunika.
