= William Miko =

Zambian abstract painter and art lecturer

William Bwalya Miko (born 1961) is a Zambian abstract painter and art lecturer. He is Head of Department in Fine Arts at the Zambian Open University.

== Life ==
As a student at Evelyn Hone College in the late 1980s Miko helped found the Zambia National Visual Arts Council, serving on the first interim national executive committee. In 1999 he obtained a Masters in Fine Art from Middlesex University. He is Senior Visual Arts Lecturer in the School of Media, Performing and Fine Arts at the Zambian Open University (ZAOU), which began teaching a Fine Arts degree course in 2010. At the first graduation of ZAOU fine arts graduates in 2014, Miko turned himself into a human canvas, wearing a white suit as students daubed and slashed paint over him in a performance titled 'Correcting the National Anomaly'.

Miko has presented conference papers on Zambian art in other African countries, as well as Europe and the United States.
