= N'gandwe Mwaba =

Zambian artist

N'gandwe Mwaba (born 1982) is a Zambian artist, winner of the 2019 Ngoma Award for Most Outstanding Male Visual Artist.

== Life ==
N'gandwe Mwaba was born in 1982 in Kitwe. Self-taught as an artist, he lives and works in Lusaka.

Painting by Mwaba – finely drawn figures coupled with abstracted silhouettes – was among the Zambian art showcased at the African Studies Gallery in Tel Aviv in 2018.
