= National Arts Council of Zambia =

Zambian entertainment institution

The National Arts Council of Zambia (NAC) is a Zambian quasi-government agency established in 1994 which began operating in 1996. The organization has the mandate to develop, regulate and promote all forms of arts in Zambia. It works with the Government, private, public and community organizations to develop the arts and strengthen the arts' contribution to Zambia's social-economic agenda. The NAC is the gateway to a network of artists, arts organizations and partners throughout Zambia. Currently, the council has over two hundred and fifty registered arts organizations, eight national arts associations, and fifty promoters.

Among other activities, it sponsors Zambia's annual Ngoma Awards, a national arts award. The NAC also organizes the Arts Business Forum, which brings together creative entrepreneurs to engage in the business of the arts. In the past, the NAC has funded various arts programmes and activities through the arts development fund. This supported vibrant artistic programmes in terms of festivals, workshops and provided travel grants.

== Associations ==
The national arts associations included under the umbrella of the National Arts Council are:

- National Theatre Arts Association of Zambia (NATAAZ)
- National Media Arts Association (NAMA)
- Zambia Folk Dance and Music Society (ZAFODAMUS)
- Zambia Women Writers Association (ZAWWA)
- Zambia Popular Theatre Alliance (ZAPOTA)
- Zambia Association of Musicians (ZAM)
- Zambia National Visual Arts Council (VAC)
- Zambia Association for Fashion Designers (ZAFD)
- Comedians Association of Zambia (COAZ)
- Zambia Arts Adjudicators’ Panel (ZAAP)

The NAC was chaired from 1996 to 2003 by Mumba Kapumpa, and from 2004 to 2017 by Mulenga Kapwepwe. A new board was announced in October 2017, and in November 2017 Patrick Samwimbila was appointed NAC chairman.

== See also ==
- Zambian music
