= Agnes Yombwe =

Zambian mixed media artist, arts educator, author and mentor

Agnes Buya Yombwe (born 18 February 1966) is a Zambian mixed media artist, arts educator, author and mentor. Her artistic practice explores indigenous knowledge systems and especially the Mbusa of Zambia's Bemba people. She also examines other societies and their response to environmental and socio-political issues facing contemporary society. Through art, symbolism and text, she explores and challenges responses to traditional and changing cultural norms. Her intent is to provoke questions, and to encourage people to engage with stereotypes and norms.

Her work focuses on highlighting taboo issues such as gender-based violence and myths around menstruation in the African context.

== Early years and education ==
Yombwe was born in Mazabuka on 18 February 1966. She attended Evelyn Hone College of Applied Arts and Commerce in Lusaka where she specialised in sculpture and graduated in 1994 with an Art Teacher Diploma. She holds a certificate in Art and Design from Wimbledon School of Arts, London.

== Career ==
Yombwe began her career in art after she won a drawing competition in high school. She was more than inspired to win the first ever drawing competition. Together with her husband, Lawrence Yombwe, she founded and runs the Wayi Wayi Art Studio and Gallery in Livingstone, where they organise art clubs and workshops for adults and children. Prior to that she taught art at Libala and Matero Boys Secondary Schools in Zambia for 7 years and in Botswana for 10 years. She has exhibited her works in Zambia, Botswana, Namibia, Norway, United Kingdom, United States of America, Germany, and Indonesia. She has also undertaken studio residencies at the Edvard Munch in Oslo, Norway and at the McColl Centre for Visual Art in North Carolina, USA.

In 2017, Yombwe was appointed as a board member to the National Arts Council of Zambia by the Minister of Arts and held that position until 2019.

== Published works ==
She authored two catalogs:

Kudumbisiana: 'she is not an artist' (2015)

Ni Mzilo - It is Taboo (2019)

== Personal life ==
She is married to Lawrence Yombwe, who is also an artist. She is known with her works in Zambia and Africa Art industry.
