= Gabriel Ellison =

Zambian artist

Gabriel Ellison (1930 – 18 July 2017) was a Zambian artist, best known for assisting in designing the national flag of Zambia, and for designing many of Zambia's stamps from the 1960s to 1980s when she was head of the Graphic Arts section at the Ministry of Information.

== Life ==
Gabriel Ellison was born as Gabriel Ryan in Lusaka, Zambia (formerly Northern Rhodesia) in 1930. Her design work included oils, acrylics, watercolours, tempera and three dimension forms. When creating sculptures, she used resin bronze and terracotta.

Ellison was a fellow member of the Royal Society of Arts, British Display Society and the Chartered Society of designers. She was honoured by both the British and Zambian Governments for her work in the arts. The British Government awarded her the MBE and The Zambian Government awarded her the Grand Officer of Distinguished Service.

Ellison died aged 87, on 18 July 2017.
