= Timeline of Lusaka =

The following is a timeline of the history of the city of Lusaka, Zambia.

== 20th century ==
- 1905
  - Railway begins operating.
  - European settlement formed.
- 1913 - Village Management Board established.
- 1926 - "District administrative headquarters" relocated to Lusaka from Chilanga (approximate date).
- 1935 - Capital of British Protectorate of Northern Rhodesia relocated to Lusaka from Livingstone.
- 1937 - City of Lusaka Football Club formed.
- 1948 - Central African Post newspaper begins publication.
- 1950 - Population: 27,100.
- 1951 - Lusaka Playhouse built.
- 1952 - African Listener radio programme begins broadcasting.
- 1954 - F. Payne becomes mayor.
- 1956 - Lusaka African Marketeers' Cooperative Society organized.
- 1958 - Waddington Theatre Club founded.
- 1959 - 20th Century cinema opens (approximate date).

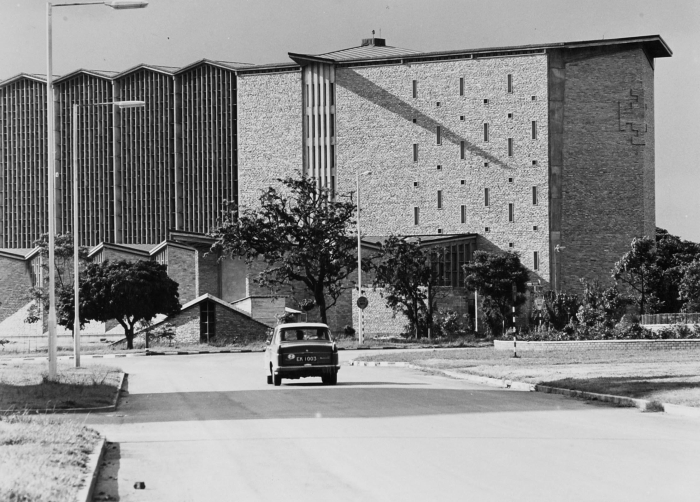
Lusaka in the 1960s

- 1960
  - Lusaka attains city status.
  - African Mail newspaper begins publication.
  - Palace cinema opens (approximate date).
  - Luburma market established (approximate date).
- 1963
  - National Archives of Zambia headquartered in city.
  - International School of Lusaka founded.
  - Population: 87,495.
- 1964
  - City becomes capital of the newly independent Republic of Zambia.
  - Independence Stadium (Zambia) opens.
- 1965
  - Rhodes Park School established.
  - Green Buffaloes F.C. founded.
- 1966 - University of Zambia founded.
- 1967
  - Mtendele "squatter township" opens.
  - Intergovernmental Council of Copper Exporting Countries established in Lusaka.
- 1968
  - Zambia Daily Mail newspaper in publication.
  - Sister city relationship established with Los Angeles, US.
- 1969 - Zambian News Agency headquartered in city.
- 1970
  - "Greater Lusaka created."
  - September: International 3rd Summit of the Non-Aligned Movement held in city.
- 1971 - Chikwakwa Theatre established at the University of Zambia.
- 1972
  - Chunga market built.
  - Population: 448,000 urban agglomeration.
- 1976
  - Housing Project Unit established.
  - United Nations Institute for Namibia inaugurated.
  - Libala, Kaunda Square, and Longacres markets established (approximate date).
- 1978 - Racial unrest.
- 1979
  - August: City hosts Commonwealth Heads of Government Meeting 1979.
  - Zambia Consumer Buying Corporation opens.

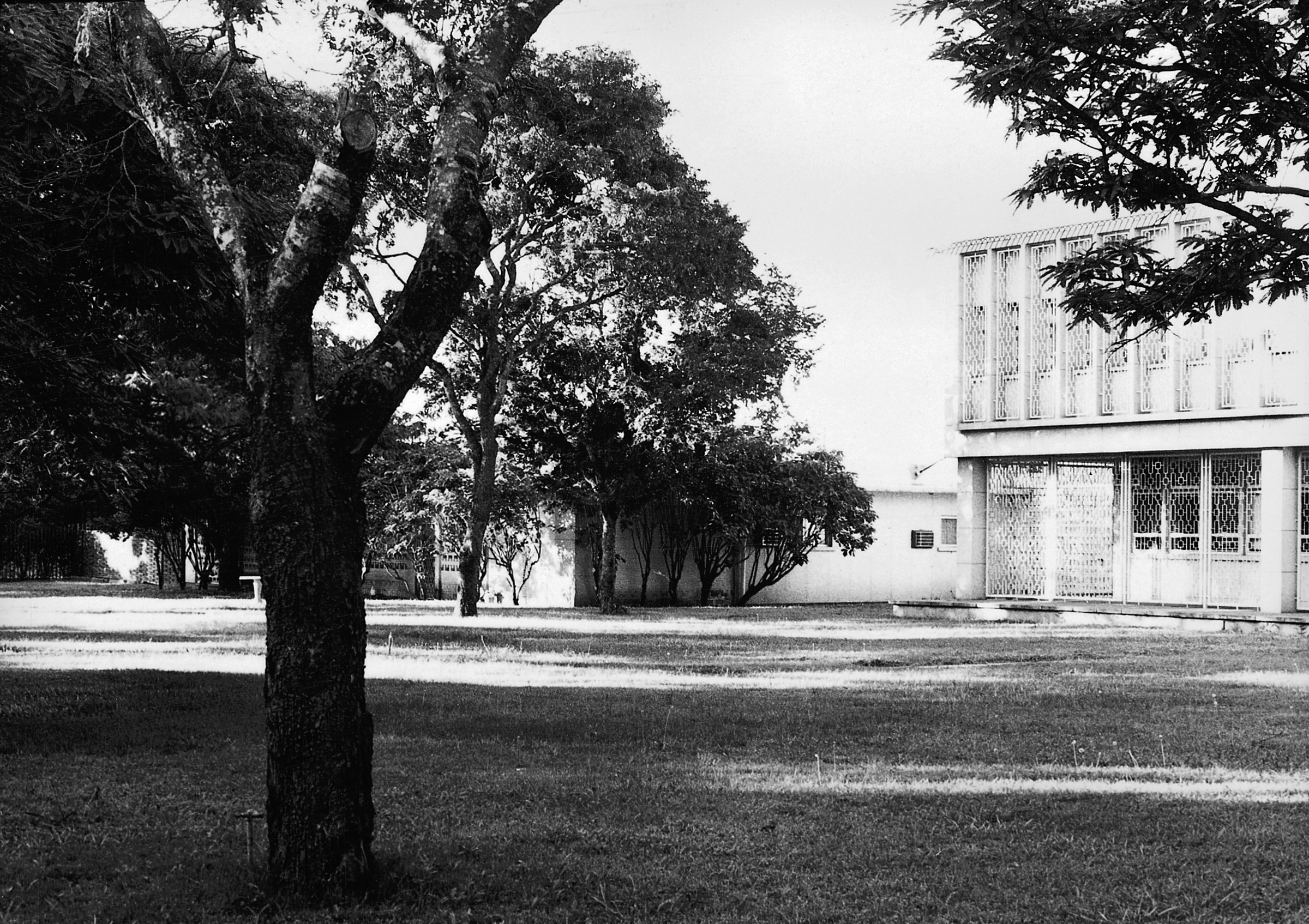
Lusaka in the 1980s

- 1980 - Population: 498,837 city; 535,830 urban agglomeration.
- 1985
  - Zanaco Football Club formed.
  - Non-governmental Organisations' Co-ordinating Committee established.
- 1990 - Population: 982,362 city.
- 1991 - Weekly Post newspaper begins publication (approximate date).
- 1994
  - 31 October: Lusaka Protocol initiated.
  - Lusaka Stock Exchange opens.
  - Common Market for Eastern and Southern Africa headquartered in Lusaka.
- 1996 - Lusaka National Museum opens.
- 1997
  - Umar Al Farook mosque opens.
  - Sustainable Lusaka Project launched.
- 1999 - University of Lusaka founded.
- 2000 - Population: 1,057,212.

== 21st century ==
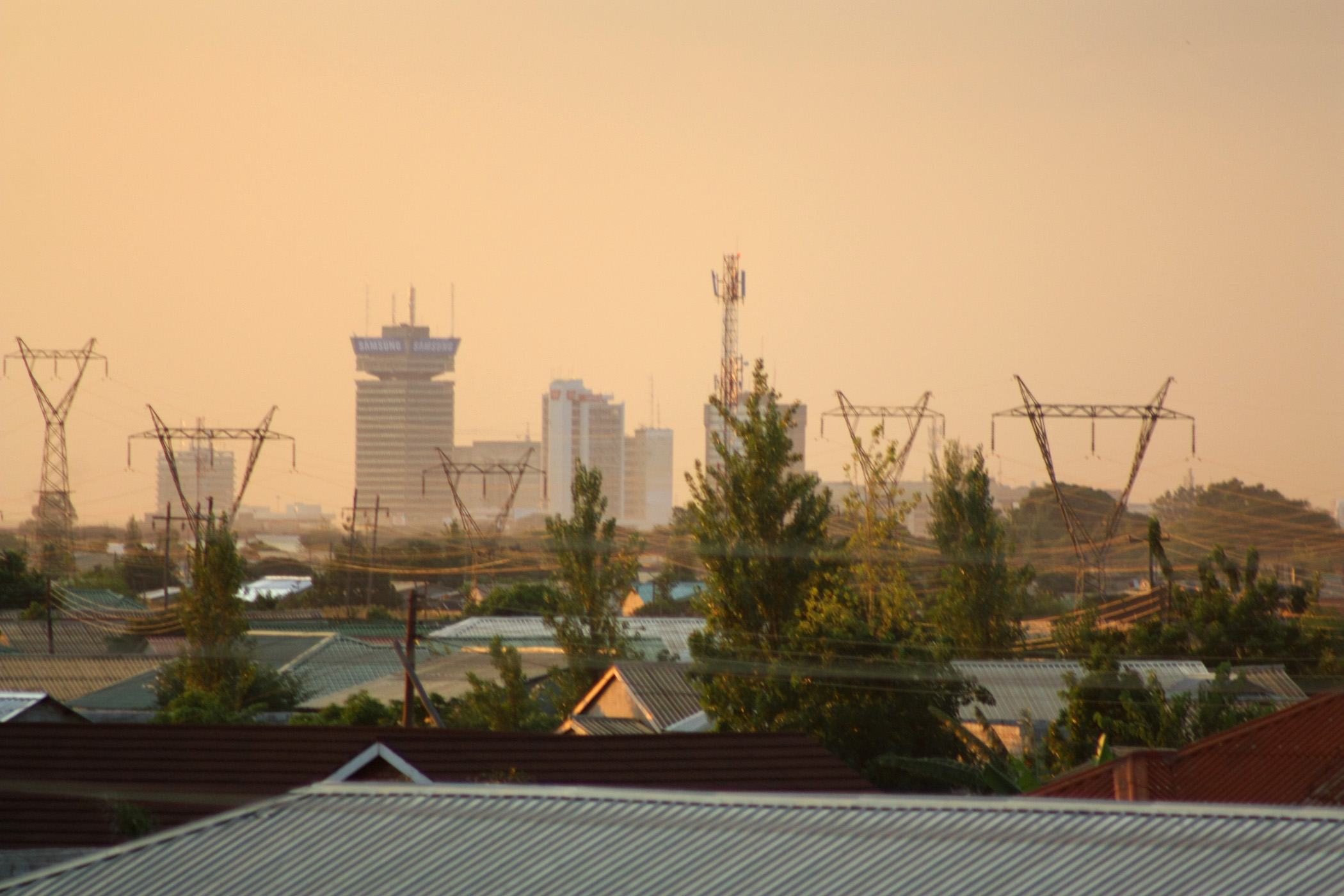
View of Lusaka, 2013

- 2001 - Munali Girls High School established.
- 2001 - Independent Churches of Zambia (ICOZ) established. ICOZ was Founded by Rev David Musonda Masupa with the help of the 2nd Republican President Fredrick Chiluba.
- 2006 - October: Post-election unrest.
- 2010
  - Daniel Chisenga becomes mayor.
  - Population: 1,747,152.
- 2012 - February: Celebration of Zambia's winning 2012 Africa Cup of Nations.
- 2017 - March: Stampede occurs.

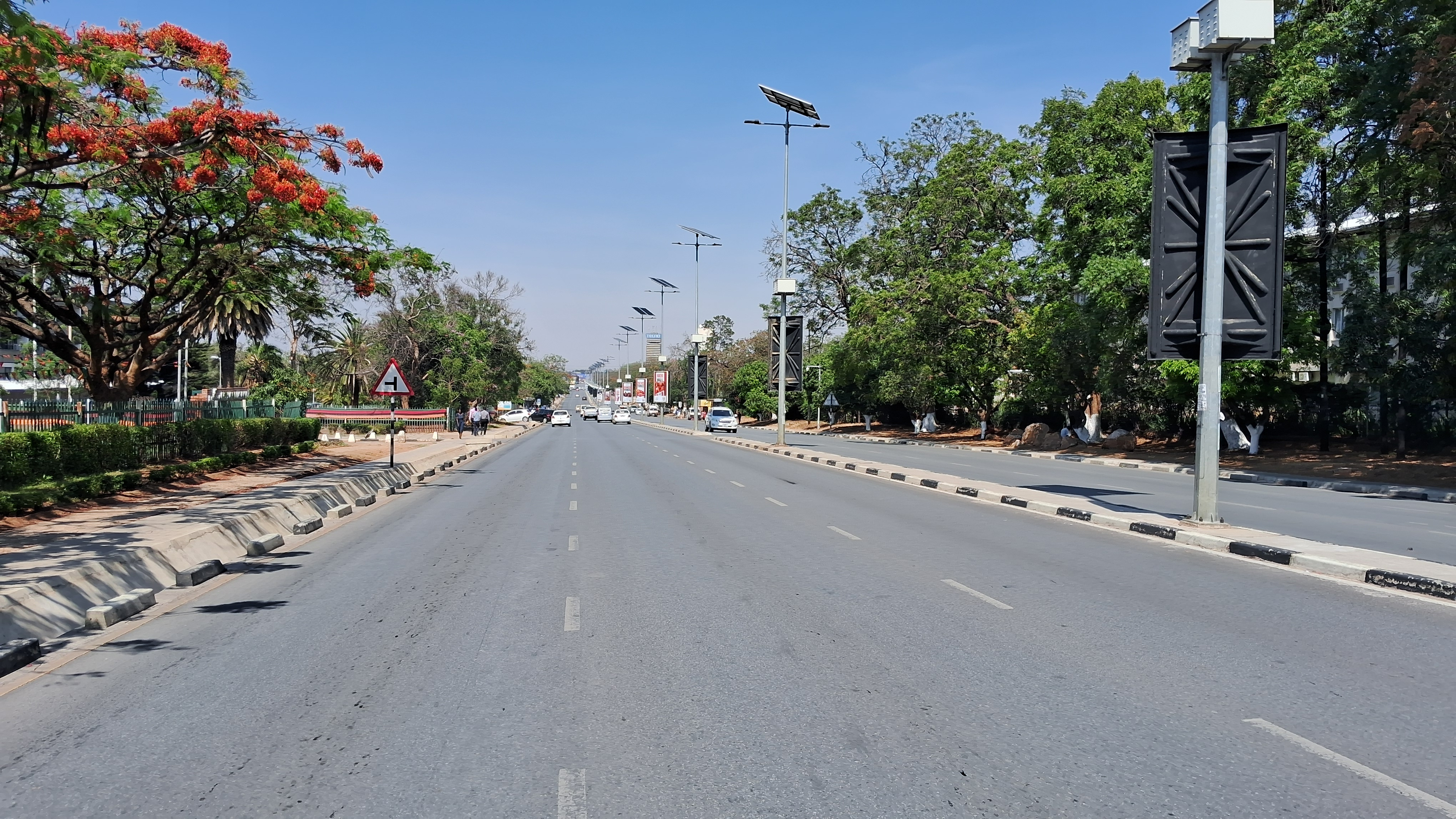
Independence avenue in 2024

== Bibliography ==
Published in 20th century

- Jack Howard (1953). "Lusaka Calling". Quarterly of Film Radio and Television. 7.
- Elizabeth Wilson (1963). "Lusaka". Geography. 48. UK: Geographical Association.
- Anthony Oberschall (1972). "Lusaka Market Vendors: Then and Now". Urban Anthropology. 1 (1): 107–123. JSTOR 40552859.
- J. Collins (1980). "Lusaka: Urban Planning in a British Colony, 1931-64". In G.E. Cherry (ed.). Shaping an Urban World. London.
- Karen Tranberg Hansen (1980). "The Urban Informal Sector as a Development Issue: Poor Women and Work in Lusaka, Zambia". Urban Anthropology. 9 (2): 199–225. JSTOR 40552918.
- Karen Tranberg Hansen (1982). "Lusaka's Squatters: Past and Present". African Studies Review. 25 (2/3): 117–136. doi:10.2307/524213. JSTOR 524213. S2CID 145505993.
- Earl P. Scott (1985). "Lusaka's Informal Sector in National Economic Development". Journal of Developing Areas. 20 (1): 71–100. JSTOR 4191418.
- E. Shamilupa Kalapula (1987). "Electrification of peri-urban areas in Lusaka, Zambia". Geography. 72. UK.
- A.W. Drescher (1996). "Urban microfarming in central Southern Africa: a case study of Lusaka, Zambia". African Urban Quarterly.
- Drescher; Mackel (2000). "Urban and peri-urban food security: the example of Lusaka (Zambia". Urbanization, vulnerability and resource management in developing countries. Germany.

Published in 21st century

- Ackson M. Kanduza (2003). "Lusaka". In Paul Tiyambe Zeleza; Dickson Eyoh (eds.). Encyclopedia of Twentieth-Century African History. Routledge. ISBN 0415234794.
- "Lusaka". Understanding Slums: Case Studies for the Global Report 2003. United Nations Human Settlements Programme and University College London. 2003.
- Kwame Anthony Appiah and Henry Louis Gates, ed. (2005). "Lusaka". Africana: The Encyclopedia of the African and African American Experience (2nd ed.). Oxford University Press. p. 661+. ISBN 978-0-19-517055-9.
- Kevin Shillington, ed. (2005). "Lusaka". Encyclopedia of African History. Fitzroy Dearborn. ISBN 978-1-57958-245-6.
- "Lusaka". African Cities Driving the NEPAD Initiative. UN-HABITAT. 2006.
- Lusaka urban profile, UN-HABITAT, 2007
