= List of Zambian actors =

This is a list of notable actors and actresses from Zambia. This list includes members of the Zambian diaspora.

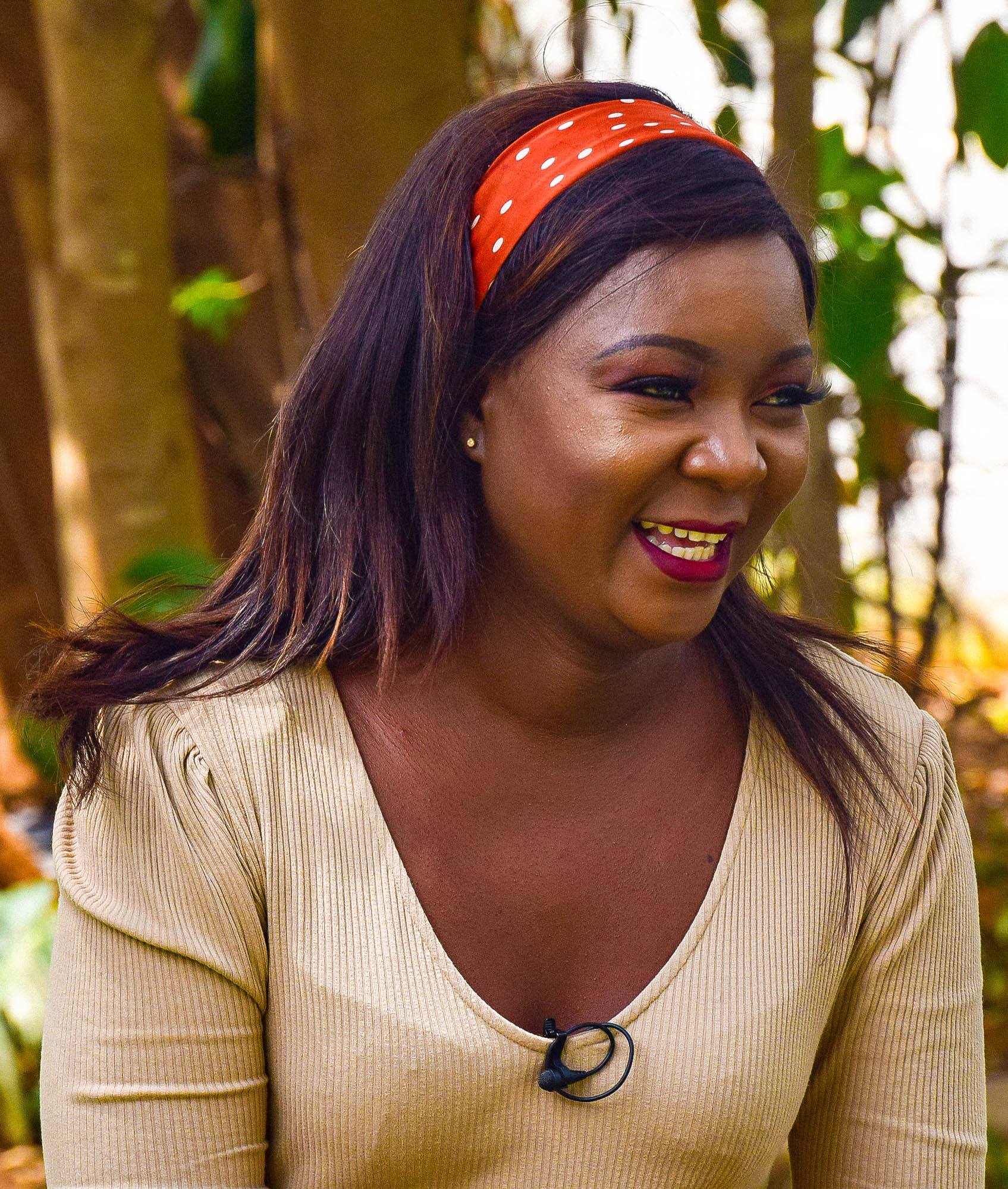
Lulu Haangala, 2021

== C ==
- Susan Chardy
- Bwalya Sophie Chibesakunda

== F ==
- David Fahm

== H ==
- Lulu Haangala
- Nancy Handabile

== K ==
- Cassie Kabwita

== L ==
- Onechi Lwenje

== M ==
- Michael Mataka
- Greg Maluma
- Ba Matero
- Elton Mulenga
- Samantha Mumba
- Akende Munalula
- Backxwash
- Shumba Patrick Mutukwa
- Owas Ray Mwape
- Mizinga Mwinga

== N ==
- Becky Ngoma
- Rungano Nyoni

== S ==
- Emeli Sandé

== See also ==
- List of Zambian people
- Cinema of Zambia
- List of film festivals in Zambia
