= Telecommunications in Zambia =

Telecommunications in Zambia includes radio, television, fixed and mobile telephones, and the Internet.

== Radio and television ==
The state-owned Zambia National Broadcasting Corporation (ZNBC) operates three radio networks. Roughly two dozen private radio stations are operating. Relays of at least two international broadcasters are accessible in Lusaka and Kitwe.

ZNBC operates one television station, and is the principal local-content provider. There is also several private TV stations. Multi-channel subscription TV services are available.

== Telephones ==
- Calling code: +260
- International call prefix: 00
- Main lines:
  - 82,500 lines in use, 150th in the world (2012);
  - 85,700 lines in use (2011).
- Mobile cellular:
  - 10.5 million lines, 76th in the world (2012);
  - 8.2 million lines (2011).
- Satellite earth stations: 2 Intelsat (1 Indian Ocean and 1 Atlantic Ocean), 3 owned by Zamtel (2010).

Facilities are among the best in sub-Saharan Africa. High-capacity microwave radio relay connects most larger towns and cities. Several cellular telephone services are in operation and network coverage is improving. A domestic satellite system is being installed to improve telephone service in rural areas. Very small aperture terminal (VSAT) networks are operated by private firms.

== Internet ==
- Top-level domain: .zm
- Internet service is widely available.
- Internet users:
  - 1.9 million users, 93rd in the world; 13.5% of the population, 160th in the world (2012);
  - 816,200 users, 105th in the world (2009).
- Fixed broadband: 14,785 subscriptions, 138th in the world; 0.1% of the population, 166th in the world (2012).
- Wireless broadband: 90,643 subscriptions, 121st in the world; 0.7% of the population, 137th in the world (2012).
- Internet hosts: 16,571 hosts, 122nd in the world (2012).
- IPv4: 162,816 addresses allocated, less than 0.05% of the world total, 6.8 addresses per 1000 people (2012).

=== Internet censorship and surveillance ===
Internet access is not restricted and individuals and groups freely express their views via the Internet, however the government frequently threatens to deregister critical online publications and blogs. In October 2012 the government attempted to deregister the blog Zambian Watchdog, but was unsuccessful because the blog was hosted abroad and therefore outside government control.

The constitution and law provide for freedom of speech and press, however the government uses provisions contained in the law to restrict these freedoms. The government is sensitive to opposition and other criticism and has been quick to prosecute critics using the legal pretext that they had incited public disorder. Libel laws are used to suppress free speech and the press.

The constitution and law prohibit arbitrary interference with privacy, family, home, or correspondence, but the government frequently does not respect these prohibitions. The law requires a search or arrest warrant before police may enter a home, except during a state of emergency or when police suspect a person has committed an offense such as treason, sedition, defamation of the president, or unlawful assembly. Police routinely enter homes without a warrant. The law grants the Drug Enforcement Commission (DEC), the Zambia Security Intelligence Service (ZSIS), and police authority to monitor communications using wiretaps with a warrant issued on the basis of probable cause, and authorities generally respect this requirement.

== See also ==
- ZAMNET, service provider and registrar for the .zm domain.
- Zamtel, state-owned telecommunications company.
- Media in Zambia
