= Freedom of the press in Zambia =

Freedom of the press in Zambia refers to the state of press freedom in the African nation of Zambia and the relevant laws thereof. As of 2026, Freedom of the Press in Zambia remains limited despite nominal protections which exist in the nation's legal framework.

== History ==
Nine years after gaining independence from Britain in 1973, the new one-party state of Zambia established a new constitution that declared citizens the legal right to condemn the Zambian government. This government was associated with their attempts to prevent citizen criticisms from being voiced. Prior to becoming president in 1991, President Frederick Chilbula pledged to his supporters the freedom of Zambian media. However, when Chibula took office he found it much more strategic to not allow the privitatization of large media outlets such as The Daily Mail and risk the publication criticism. This resulted in the continuation of these medias as state-run outlets. Two of the editors of media outlet "The Post" were held in jail in 1996 by the government due to their publishing of an article about Vice President Godfrey Miyanda's actions in parliament that was seen as disrespectful by the government. The Lusaka High Court issued an interim injunction preventing News Diggers! from airing a documentary about Chinese investment in Zambia. The order was later set aside by the High Court.

Freedoms of expression and of the press are constitutionally guaranteed in Zambia, but the government frequently restricts these rights in practice. Although the ruling Patriotic Front has pledged to free state-owned media—consisting of the Zambia National Broadcasting Corporation (ZNBC) and the widely circulated Zambia Daily Mail and Times of Zambia—from government editorial control, these outlets have generally continued to report along pro-government lines. Many journalists reportedly practice self-censorship since most government newspapers do have prepublication review. The ZNBC dominates the broadcast media, though several private stations have the capacity to reach large portions of the population.

The rights group Freedom House, which publishes annual country reports on press freedom status, has ranked Zambia's press as “Not Free” even in 2016.

== Recent threats to press freedom ==
Through the implementation of the Immigration and Deportation Act, the Zambian government in deported Roy Clark in 2004. Roy Clark was a satirical writer for The Post and possessed both lifelong residency and British citizenship. Clark compared the members of the Zambian government to animals in order to satirically comment on the political situation of the country and the government at the time in an article released on January 1st, 2004. This article resulted in his receiving a 24-hour time limit to leave the country, which was then followed by Clark's reported hiding.

government and ruling party, “Patriotic Front”, regularly take punitive steps against critical news outlets. In 2016, government authorities ordered the closure of the publishing company Post Newspapers Limited, on 21 June, demanding $6.1 million tax in arrears. This closure occurred after The Post accused Zambian authorities of selectively applying the law to target the publication for its news coverage. There were some accusations on the part of the PF party by Reporters Without Borders that condemn attacks on media pluralism during the campaign for 2016 presidential election in Zambia due to the ruling Patriotic Front's harassment and threats against several news outlets.

Media coverage has also been very partisan during the campaign, with the main opposition party, the United Party for National Development (UPND), filing a complaint against the Zambia National Broadcasting Corporation (ZNBC) for failing to cover the rallies of its candidate, Hakainde Hichilema.

In 2014, journalists and outlets faced harassment and physical attacks both in the course of their work and in retaliation for their reporting, and media practitioners reported a general climate of increased intimidation.

Community and privately owned radio stations encountered intensified harassment and threats by local government officials and PF party cadres, especially after hosting opposition figures on call-in shows or criticizing local officials on the air. In April 2014, PF cadres raided Sun FM in Copperbelt Province during an interview with Hakainde Hichilema (an opposition presidential candidate for United Party for National Development in 2006, 2008, 2011, 2015 and 2016) forcing the candidate to flee. In September, PF cadres went to the offices of independent Breeze FM, in the eastern town of Chipata. They threatened to assault the news editor in retribution for statements made during a live program about the party's poor showing in a recent by-election.

== Legal environment ==
Since gaining independence on October 24, 1964, Zambia has passed a number of laws affecting press freedom. The Defamation Act of 1964 restricts freedom of expression, among other things by criminalizing defamation. The State Security Act of 1969 limits free speech and media freedom, thereby restricting the possibility to criticize the government and its officials. The Telecommunication Act of 1994 establishes an authority, which administers radio frequency spectrum leaving the approval of licenses under the authority of the Minister of Information and Broadcasting Services. The ZNBC Amendment Act of 2002 and Independent Broadcasting Authority Act of 2002 were efforts made to establish independent regulations on freedom of the Press, but could not be implemented, as the issues were not resolved in the Courts as of 2005. In 2003, it was determined that out of the 28 African countries determined to be "near-democracies", Zambia existed as a part of the 39.3% of those countries whose governments jailed journalists for criticism of the leaders.

A study done in 2017 found that 95% of 52% of Zambian members of Parliament believed that freedom of the press in Zambia should be expanded.

On June 8, 2010, Pansy Tlakula, the African Union's special rapporteur on freedom of expression tried to persuade the Zambian government to repeal section 116(1)(d) of the Zambian Penal Code, “which criminalizes speech or writing that could prejudice opinion regarding ongoing judicial proceedings.” This, according to him, is contrary to what is obtainable in the regional and international law for freedom of expression.

It was on April 30, 2012, that a draft constitution was released that had provisions on freedom of the press. The draft constitution, Article 38 guarantees freedom and independence for electronic, print, and other media. Part of it holds that:

(a) The State shall not exercise control over, or interfere with, any person engaged in broadcasting, the production or circulation of any publication, or the dissemination of information by any medium; or (b) penalize any person for any opinion or the content of any broadcast, publication or dissemination. (First Draft Constitution of the Republic of Zambia)

The article goes on to say that government-controlled media will also be able to operate independently. The Press Association of Zambia (PAZA), and Foundation for Democratic Process (FODEP) supported this idea. It is a giant step towards the media law reforms that helps in providing freedom of the media.” Foundation for Democratic Process (FODEP)

Journalist Thomas Allan Zgambo has been charged on multiple occasions for sedition after writing critical articles about the Zambian government.

== Media market ==
ZNBC is leading in control of the media market in Zambia, together with the two newspapers belonging to the State and The Post.

There are four major newspapers in Zambia: Times of Zambia and the Zambia Daily which are owned by the State; The Post which is the only independent newspaper and Sunday Times of Zambia which is sponsored by UNIP. The publication remains only in English language with the range of about 25,000-50,000 in circulations. The newspapers operate also online services. There are about 9 Television stations and 28 Radio stations in Zambia.

Zambia, in the recent times, had witnessed the establishment of many private television and radio stations with different audiences. Some are independent newspapers and private radio stations. Radio stations such as UNZA Radio, Radio Phoenix and Pan African Radio do programs that express wild range of expressions and critical viewpoints. “Radio remains the medium of choice in most of the country because of its relatively low cost of access, but many stations face financial difficulties due to their dependence on sponsored programming and the small advertising market.”

ZANIS- Zambia News and information Services remains the state-owned agency in the country as a public relations wing of government under the Ministry of Information, Broadcasting Services.

== Radio Freedom ==
Despite their lack of freedom in the media during this time, the Zambian government supported the liberation movement of South Africa in Lusaka through their support the ANC's Radio Freedom during 1967–1992. The country provided the movement through the supplying of broadcasting appliances along with an overall space to broadcast.

The Internet has remained one of the main sources that journalists and bloggers in Zambia use to express their critical views about the government. Some websites such as Zambia reports and Zambia Watchdog, that are famous, have suffered partial interruptions and blocking of signals by the government in the past. The 2015 report of the freedom house estimated that Internet penetration in Zambia is 21 percent of the population. Those in the Urban cities have more access to the Internet services than those in the rural areas who encounter poor signals and high cost payment. The Zambian Bloggers Network was created in 2012 to promote these journalists and bloggers and their continuation of writing about social issues that may not often appear in the media. The bloggers featured within this network worked with the commitment to presenting to the citizens of Zambia events and information that is restricted.

== See also ==
- Human rights in Zambia
- Media in Zambia
- Journalists
