= List of newspapers in Zambia =

This is an incomplete list of newspapers published in Zambia.

== Newspapers ==
- Lusaka Times
- Times of Zambia (daily, state-owned)
- Zambian Business Times (ZBT)
- Zambia Daily Mail (daily, state-owned)
- Zambian Watchdog (online; in print from 2007 to 2009)
- News Diggers! (daily)
- The Mast (daily)
- Daily Nation (daily)
- Daily Revelation Newspaper
- New Vision (daily)
- The Post (daily, closed in 2016)
- Mwebantu
- Zambia Reports
- Lusaka Voice
- The Independent Observer (daily)
- Sunday Mail (weekly)
- Sunday Times (weekly)

== See also ==
- Northern Rhodesia Government Gazette, colonial gazette
- Media in Zambia
