= ZAMNET =

Internet service provider

ZAMNET Communication Systems Ltd.
- Industry: Internet
- Founded: Lusaka, Zambia 1994
- Headquarters: Lusaka, Zambia
- Area served: Zambia
- Services: Internet service
- Website: zamnet.zm

ZAMNET Communication Systems Ltd., established in 1994, is primarily a Zambian Internet service provider.

Zamnet was also the domain name registry for the .zm country code top-level domain until that function was delegated to ZICTA in 2014. It now provides only the services of a registrar.
