= Bantu Education =

Bantu Education may refer to:

- Bantu Education Act
- Bantu Education Department
- Bantu Educational Kinema Experiment
