= Stella Adler Studio of Acting =

Acting school in the United States

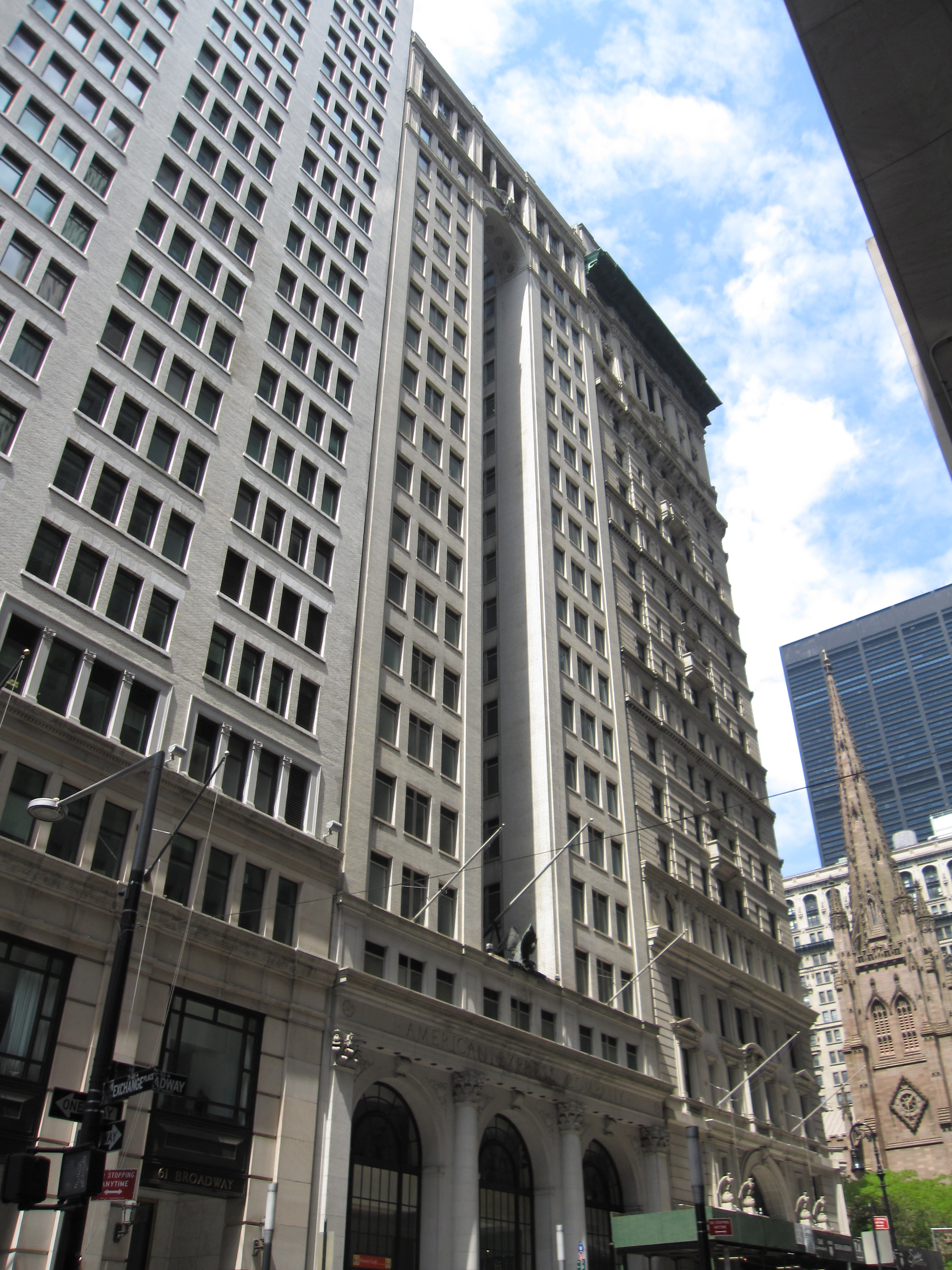
- The Stella Adler Studio of Acting in the historic 65 Broadway building.
- Established: 1949 (77 years ago)
- Types: Drama school, conservatory
- Headquarters: New York City, U.S.
- Coordinates: 40°46′26″N 73°58′59″W

The Stella Adler Studio of Acting (formerly the Stella Adler Conservatory) is an acting school founded in 1949 by actress and teacher Stella Adler. It has two locations: its original conservatory in New York City, and the Art of Acting Studio in Los Angeles, established in 2010. Headquartered at the Stella Adler Center for the Arts, located at 65 Broadway in New York City, the Stella Adler Studio of Acting is administered by Tom Oppenheim, Adler's grandson.

The Stella Adler Studio of Acting is not affiliated with the Stella Adler Academy of Acting and Theatre, established in Los Angeles in 1985 by Adler, Joanne Linville and Irene Gilbert. Although the two schools are sometimes regarded as competitors, they frequently collaborate on programs and share faculty.

== History ==
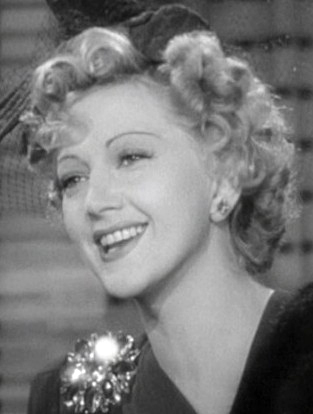
Stella Adler in 1941, in the film Shadow of the Thin Man

Concurrent with her work as an actor and director, Stella Adler began to teach in the early 1940s at the Erwin Piscator Workshop at the New School for Social Research in New York. She left the faculty in 1949 to establish her own studio in New York in the same year. Combining what she had learned from the Yiddish theatre, the Group Theatre, Broadway, Hollywood, and Konstantin Stanislavski, she created the Stella Adler Theatre Studio. It was later renamed the Stella Adler Conservatory of Acting and more recently the Stella Adler Studio of Acting, where she taught acting for many decades.

The studio offered courses in principles of acting, voice and speech, Shakespeare, movement, and makeup, as well as workshops in play analysis, character, scene preparation, and acting styles. Onstage experience was acquired by performances of scenes and plays before an invited audience. Among her early students were Marlon Brando, Robert De Niro, Warren Beatty, Elaine Stritch, Mario Van Peebles, Harvey Keitel, and Candice Bergen.

== Art of Acting Studio ==
The Stella Adler Studio of Acting's official West Coast branch is the Art of Acting Studio in Los Angeles, named after Adler's most famous book. Established in 2010, the Los Angeles campus merged the Ron Burrus Studio of Acting Los Angeles, founded in 1985, and the Brad Henke Studio, founded in 2001. The studio is not affiliated with the Stella Adler Academy of Acting and Theatre in Los Angeles, although the two schools often collaborate on programs and share faculty.

== Administration ==
The Stella Adler Studio of Acting continues to be operated by the Adler family; Tom Oppenheim, Adler's grandson, has led the organization as artistic director since 1995. Warren Beatty has served as honorary chair since 2004.

== Notable alumni ==
- Utkarsh Ambudkar
- Caitlin Bassett
- Warren Beatty
- Byrdie Bell
- Candice Bergen
- Larry Blyden
- Peter Bogdanovich
- Marlon Brando
- James Coburn
- Calico Cooper
- Bud Cort
- Robert De Niro
- Leah Dizon
- Conrad Dunn
- Alden Ehrenreich
- Maya Eshet
- Wayne Federman
- Chloe Fineman
- Nina Foch
- Teri Garr
- Valeria Gastaldi
- Pamela Gidley
- Alexander Godunov
- Melanie Griffith
- Christopher Guest
- Jean Hale
- Jessica Hecht
- Bryce Dallas Howard
- Harvey Keitel
- Sally Kellerman
- Perry King
- Bianca Lawson
- Cloris Leachman
- Natasha Leggero
- Jane Levy
- Karl Malden
- Thuso Mbedu
- Rafael Morais
- Larry Moss
- Sergej Moya
- Donna Murphy
- Kate Mulgrew
- Adam Nagaitis
- Judd Nelson
- Bill Paxton
- Sydney Tamiia Poitier
- Coral Peña
- Sydney Pollack
- Anthony Quinn
- Eva Marie Saint
- John Saxon
- Martin Sheen
- Maya Shoef
- Darrell M. Smith
- Elaine Stritch
- Nitya Vidyasagar
