= Kay Sifuniso =

Zambian journalist

- Born: Mongu
- Citizenship: Zambia
- Education: Chipembi Girls Secondary School
- Occupation: Journalist
- Known for: First black female Zambia journalist

Kay Sifuniso (born c. 1942) is a Zambian journalist, notable as the first black female Zambian journalist.

== Life ==
Kay Sifuniso was born in Mongu and educated at Chipembi Girls Secondary School. In January 1964, she started work as a journalist at the Central African Mail. After 18 months, she moved to work for the Times of Zambia, doubling her salary. She later moved into public relations, working for Lightfoot Advertising, and worked for the Tourist Board for a year. In 1971, she left formal employment to look after land that she and her husband had bought in Lusaka West.
