= Paza (disambiguation) =

Paza is an alternative name for the Iranian town of Razeh, South Khorasan.

Paza may also refer to:

- PAZA, the Anchorage Air Route Traffic Control Center
- Paza language, a Loloish language of northern Laos
- Paza, DRC, a town in the Democratic Republic of Congo once controlled by the Katanga insurgency
- PAZA (Press Association of Zambia), an organization concerned with freedom of the press in Zambia
- Paza Rahm, musician on Beck’s 2005 EP Hell Yes

== See also ==
- Jachcha Paza, an archaeological site in Bolivia
