= Crime in Zambia =

Zambia
- Crime rates* (2023)

Violent crimes
- Homicide: 2.2
- Rape: 22
- Robbery: 13.1
- Aggravated assault: 62.1
- Total violent crime: 55.9

Property crimes
- Burglary: 201.8
- Motor vehicle theft: 23.3
- Arson: 11.6
- Total property crime: 225.9
- Note: Reported crimes per 100,000 population

Crime in Zambia has been on high level since pre-colonial times. However, after the country gained independence in the 1960s, the government-imposed laws against crime were in effect.

== History ==
=== Pre-colonial period ===
Various kingdoms and empires with their own systems of governance and justice existed in Zambia during the pre-colonial era. Nevertheless, criminal activities occasionally took place. King Kazembe VII is best known for engaging in slavery and serial killings at Kazembe Kingdom. The Mukuni people were also known to engage in raids and plundering of neighboring tribes, with Chief Mukuni being a notable leader in these attacks.

==== Slave trade and human sacrifices ====
During the period between 1550 and 1890, there was a reputation of cruelty when it came to slavery along with human sacrifices in Kazembe Kingdom. King Kazembe VII who lived between 1780 until his assassination between 1780 and 1800 has been named as one of his key accomplices in this defilement. His infamous misdeeds were among others trafficking captured individuals as well as their sale from 1780 through1795 especially from neighboring tribes and countries in the form of slavery. He practiced human sacrifices on a large scale, with estimates suggesting that over 1,000 people were sacrificed during his reign that span from 1785 to 1790.

He was also involved in massacres where he ordered the massacre of entire villages and tribes that refused to submit to his rule or pay tribute from 1782 to 1792. He was also known for his cruel methods of punishment, including torture, mutilation, and dismemberment and numerous raids on neighboring tribes and kingdoms, plundering their resources and wealth.

==== Raids and plundering ====
The Mukuni people (1600–1850) were known to engage in raids and plundering of neighboring tribes, with Chief Mukuni (1750–1780) being a notable leader in these attacks. The Ngoni people (1820–1900) were also infamous for their cattle rustling and raids on neighboring tribes, with Chief Zwangendaba (1820–1848) leading many of these attacks.

===== Witchcraft and sorcery =====
Many pre-colonial societies in Zambia believed in witchcraft and sorcery, with accused witches being punished or killed, often without trial. The Bemba people (1600–1900) were known to practice witchcraft and sorcery, with notable practitioners such as Chief Nondo (1750–1780).

===== Tribal wars =====
Pre-colonial Zambia was characterized by frequent tribal wars over land, resources, and power. The Lozi people (1800–1900) fought numerous wars with neighboring tribes, including the Kololo people (1840–1864), led by Chief Sebetwane.

=== Colonial era ===
In the colonial period, Zambia was ruled by the British, and there was a high incidence of crime among the British colonial officials and settlers. The scandal “Land Grab” involved British colonial officials as well as settlers who took over some lands from local communities without any authorization from the two countries’ constitutions followed by displacing thousands. In this scandal governor Hubert Winthrop Young played a major role with another colonial administrator Robert Codrington. The colonial era also saw the exploitation of Zambia's natural resources, with companies such as the British South Africa Company engaging in illegal mining and trading activities.

=== Current era ===
In the current era, crime remains a significant challenge in Zambia. High-profile cases include the "Cashgate" scandal, where millions of dollars were embezzled from the government treasury, implicating officials such as former President Rupiah Banda and Minister of Finance Situmbeko Musokotwane. The "Fertilizer Scandal" saw a corrupt tendering process lead to the awarding of a contract to a company linked to then-Minister of Agriculture Given Lubinda. Other notable crimes include drug trafficking, with convicted drug lord William Harrington, and murder, with notorious criminal Kabwe Kasongo.

== Types of crimes ==
=== Corruption ===
Corruption is a pervasive crime in Zambia, with high-ranking officials and politicians embezzling funds and accepting bribes. Notable individuals involved in corruption scandals include former President Rupiah Banda and Minister of Finance Situmbeko Musokotwane.

=== Drug Trafficking ===
Drug trafficking is a significant crime in Zambia, with criminal organizations such as the "Zambia Drug Cartel" smuggling drugs through the country. In the 1980s, Zambia became a major transshipment point for cocaine and heroin destined for Europe and North America. The Zambia Drug Cartel, led by William Harrington, emerged as a major player in the international drug trade in the 1990s.

In 2001, Zambian authorities seized 600 kilograms of cocaine at Lusaka International Airport, marking one of the largest drug busts in the country's history. William Harrington was arrested and convicted of drug trafficking in 2003, but later escaped from prison.

The Zambian government established the Drug Enforcement Commission (DEC) in 2005 to combat drug trafficking. In 2010, the DEC arrested several high-ranking officials, including a former minister, for involvement in drug trafficking.

In 2012, a plane carrying 1,000 kilograms of cocaine crashed in northern Zambia, highlighting the country's continued role in the international drug trade. Zambian authorities seized 1,400 kilograms of cocaine at Lusaka International Airport in 2015, and 1,100 kilograms of cocaine at the border with Mozambique in 2020.

Other reported individuals associated with drug trafficking in Zambia included William Harrington, Emmanuel Harrington (William's brother and fellow drug trafficker), Kabwe Kasongo (convicted drug trafficker), Chishimba Kambwili (former minister accused of drug trafficking and defaming president) and Xu Jing Hu (Chinese national arrested with heroin).

=== Human Trafficking ===
Human trafficking is a serious crime in Zambia, with vulnerable individuals being exploited and forced into labor or prostitution. The "Zambia Human Trafficking Ring" is a known criminal organization involved in this crime.

=== Fraud ===
Fraud is a common crime in Zambia, with individuals such as businessman and politician, Hakainde Hichilema, being accused of fraudulent activities.

=== Murder ===
Murder is a serious crime in Zambia, with notorious criminals like Kabwe Kasongo committing heinous crimes.

=== Cybercrime ===
Cybercrime in Zambia has a growing history, with the country's increasing reliance on technology making it a target for cybercriminals. In the early 2000s, Zambia saw a rise in cybercrime, with instances of hacking and fraud reported. This led to the establishment of the Zambia Information and Communications Technology Authority (ZICTA) in 2005, which aimed to regulate the ICT sector and combat cybercrime.

In 2007, the first major cybercrime case was reported, involving a group of hackers who stole millions of dollars from Zambian banks. This incident highlighted the need for stronger cybersecurity measures and led to the establishment of a Cybercrime Unit within the Zambia Police Service in 2010. The unit was tasked with investigating and prosecuting cybercrimes.

Other crimes include Chinese nationals in Zambia.

In 2012, a group of cybercriminals, led by notorious hacker Emmanuel Mwale, was arrested for hacking into the Zambia Revenue Authority's database. This arrest marked a significant milestone in Zambia's fight against cybercrime. In 2015, ZICTA launched a cybersecurity awareness campaign to educate the public about online safety and best practices.

The Zambian government took a further step in 2017 by passing the Cyber Security and Cyber Crimes Act, aimed at combating cybercrime. The act provided a legal framework for prosecuting cybercrimes and imposed harsh penalties on offenders. Despite these efforts, cybercrime continues to be a significant concern in Zambia, with a major data breach occurring at a leading Zambian bank in 2019 and a surge in cybercrime reported during the COVID-19 pandemic in 2020.

Individuals associated with cybercrime in Zambia include Esther Lungu, Emmanuel Mwale, and Chibesa Kalandanya, a convicted cybercriminal. Mwanga Mwale, a cybersecurity expert and consultant, has also been involved in efforts to combat cybercrime in Zambia.
