= Cinema of Zambia =

Cinema of Zambia refers to the cinema and film industry of the country of Zambia.

In colonial Northern Rhodesia, commercial cinemas often operated de facto racial segregation, with 35-mm. cinemas showing to white audiences and 16-mm. cinemas showing to black audiences. However. open-air screening of films to Copperbelt mining communities led to widespread appreciation of Hollywood Westerns. Colonial administrators attempted to use cinema for educational instruction of miners and rural communities.

Since Zambian independence in 1964, outdoor screening has continued to be an important vehicle for cinema, and the Zambian government has continued to try to use cinema as a means of public relations. Though there are commercial film production companies in Zambia, they have not managed to achieve prominence.

== Cinema audiences in Northern Rhodesia ==
Marcus Grill, a Jewish businessman, opened Northern Rhodesia's first open-air cinema in Livingstone in 1917. Two years later he opened Grill's Kinema, housed in a corrugated iron building. The Grill family opened Zambia's first cinema for talking pictures in 1931. Respondents to the Colonial Office in 1927 reported that "natives are not admitted to the European cinematograph displays". There was, however, a weekly showing for workers at the Kabwe mine (then known as Broken Hill). The American board of missions, and Johannesburg police, censored films before they arrived in Northern Rhodesia.

== Film-making in Northern Rhodesia ==
In 1932, the missionary J. Merle Davis visited Northern Rhodesia to study the effects of Copperbelt mining on traditional communities. Arguing that cinema could help illiterate Africans adjust to industrialization, he helped found the Bantu Educational Kinema Experiment (BEKE). BEKE produced thirty-five educational films between 1935 and 1937, though the films' poor technical quality led to a withdrawal of support by many East African colonial administrators. Only Northern Rhodesia was willing to continue funding the project. The country "was more cinema conscious than other parts of black Africa because, as a result of the mine cinemas on the comparatively urbanised Copper Belt, it probably had then the largest concentration of African cinema-goers outside of South Africa." Colonial administrators viewed this "large black mining population as a potential source of instability".

In 1957, the first multi-racial cinema opened in Lusaka.

In 1959, the Northern Rhodesia Information Department produced six 16-mm. educational films for Africans. A small number of 35-mm. films were also made, including Kariba Game Reserve, a short feature widely circulated outside Rhodesia. The Central African Film Unit also produced two fortnightly newsreels – 'Rhodesia and Nysaland News', intended for African audiences, and another intended for European audiences – as well as a variety of informational, educational, tourist and general-interest short films.

== Cinema audiences in Zambia ==
Though there are few cinemas in Zambia, "film shows are an established part of Zambian life". Private commercial companies, and the Government-run Zambian Information Services (ZIS), put on open-air screenings in rural areas. In the early 1970s, Zambia had about 100 'Film-Rovers': Land Rovers equipped to show 16mm films with amplified sound.

In 1964 Zambia had 13 indoor commercial cinemas equipped with 35mm projectors, and three others with 16mm projectors. Though racial segregation was prohibited by law, white audiences predominated in the more expensive 35-mm. cinemas, and black African audiences predominated in the less expensive 16-mm. cinemas. By 1971, there were 28 cinemas, with a seating capacity of 13,400.

Commercial cinemas show films mostly from Britain and America, with some Indian films to cater to Zambia's small Asian community.

== Government film-making in Zambia ==
The Zambia Information Services (ZIS) was established on independence in 1964, as a successor to the Northern Rhodesia Information Services and the Central African Film Unit. A ZIS film unit makes documentary films in Zambia. In the early 1970s this unit was supposed to be making a new documentary every fortnight, with over 30 copies, including some copies with Zambian language sound-tracks in Bemba, Nyanja, Tonga and Lozi. However, the unit did not manage this level of production, and a shortage of skilled translators meant that many of the documentaries remained in English.

In 2005, ZIS merged with the Zambia News Agency (ZANA) to form the Zambia News and Information Services (ZANIS).

== Private filmmaking in Zambia ==
The Zimbabwean film director Michael Raeburn shot part of Killing Heat, his 1981 version of Doris Lessing's first novel The Grass is Singing, in Zambia.

In 1999, an independent production company, Ambush Productions, was founded in Zambia. Their feature documentary. Choka!, also titled Get Lost!, portrayed the daily life of Zambian street children. The film was nominated for International Documentary Association awards. Imiti Ikula (2001) was a documentary following the life of an AIDS orphan on the streets of Lusaka.
