= Onechi Lwenje =

Zambian actor and author

- Born: 1985 (age 40–41); Lusaka, Zambia
- Occupations: Actor, author, director, producer
- Years active: 1999–present

Onechi Lwenje (born 1985) is an actor in Zambian cinema. Apart from acting, Onechi is also a prolific author, filmmaker, award-winning producer and director. He is the founder of a media production company called 'Landmark Communications Limited' and founder of a game development company, music publisher and animation studio called 'Courtland Media Lab'.

== Personal life ==
Onechi was born in 1985 in Lusaka, Zambia to a veteran journalist father and an agro-economist mother in a family with three siblings. His father Patson Victor Robert Lwenje served in the diplomatic service in Beijing, China, where Onechi was two and a half years old at that time. Patson was also a journalist in the 1980s, a music critic and entertainment writer.

Onechi completed primary education from International School of Beijing, Nkwazi Primary and Gospel Outreach Christian Academy. Then he attended to Kabulonga Boys Secondary School for secondary education and finished education in 2002. Then, he pursued studies in Information Systems Management at ZCAS. He is also a certified Microsoft Systems Engineer and worked for NCC Phoenix Contractors and Mediterranean Shipping Company for few years.

== Career ==
In 1999, Onechi joined with a Zambia project to produce a play around a theme of anti-aids and drugs and this play was called Don't. He performed in that play in neighboring districts in about 10 schools. Meanwhile, he lost few years of life to shipping company. Then in 2005, he started to composed poems and joined with several magazines and publications including 'Nkhani Kulture' in 2010 and 'Nkwazi In-Flight' in 2013.

At the same time, Onechi featured in a series of programs and advertorials for Electoral Commission of Zambia (ECZ) and Zamtel. After establishing as a popular author, he formed the Media Company called 'Landmark Communications Limited'. His first production was Shift which airing on the national broadcaster. Then he made his first feature film Guilt in 2013. The film won the awards for the Best Movie, Best Cinematography and Best Editing at 2014 Zambia Film Television and Radio Awards Ceremony.

In 2013, he became the Deputy Editor for the in-flight magazine of international airline, 'Proflight'. Then he became the Editor-in-Chief in industry specific publications such as ‘Agri-Pro’ ‘Agri-Plus’ and ‘Zambian Mining’. He was also honored with prestigious assignments such as authoring the official biography of the City of Lusaka for its ‘Lusaka 100’ centenary celebrations.

Onechi continued to work Information Technology manager for an international shipping company for ten years. After quit from the job, he joined with a South African Advertising Agency called 'Jupiter Drawing Room' as a copy writer. In 2014, he started to attend Rotary Club of Lusaka Central, which changed his life towards success. In the same year, he acted in the television serial Love Games, that won an Africa Magic Viewer's Choice Award. In 2016, he acted as 'Fletcher' in Zambezi Magic TV series Fever. In the same year, he created a web series called The Adventures of Duncan Hollywood: Rise of a Zambian Superstar.

He appeared as the host and presenter of one of the episodes of My Africa on Africa Channel. Then, he appeared in the fifth episode of My Lusaka on the My Africa series which aired in the United States.

In 2017, Onechi was inducted as the 48th president of the Rotary Club of Lusaka Central becoming the youngest to hold the position up to date. As the president, he took the helm of a Club that has undertaken notable projects such as construction of the Italian Orthopaedic hospital, Kabulonga Youth Skills Training Centre and Vita-Nova project for supplying medical stuff for Chongwe hospital and University Teaching Hospital (UTH) pediatric ward to treat heart diseases and fever. The club has embarked on other infrastructure projects such as constructing a classroom block in the rural part of Chibombo district.

== Filmography ==
Year	Film/Serial	Roles	Ref.
2012	Shift	Producer	
2013	Guilt	Director	
2014	Love Games	As actor	
2016	Fever	Actor: Fletcher	
2017	My Africa	As presenter	
