= Thomas Allan Zgambo =

Zambian investigative journalist

- Citizenship: Zambia
- Occupation: Investigative journalist
- Employer(s): Zambian Watchdog; Zambian Whistleblower
- Criminal charges: Sedition
- Criminal status: Under investigation

Thomas Allan Zgambo is a Zambian investigative journalist. He has been charged with sedition on multiple occasions due to his articles critical of the Zambian government.

== Biography ==
Zgambo first rose to prominence through his work with the Zambian Watchdog, an investigative online media platform that reported on corruption in Zambia. In 2013, Zgambo was charged with sedition under a colonial-era law after documents about the then-President of Zambia, Michael Sata, were found at his home. Zgambo was subsequently released on a bond, but never received a court date in relation to the charge.

The Zambian Watchdog was publicly supportive of Hakainde Hichilema, the United Party for National Development candidate in the 2015 presidential election held after Sata's death, with Zgambo a notable exception, having publicly expressed his support for Rupiah Banda. Hichilema did not win the election, being defeated by Edgar Lungu of the Patriotic Front, but was subsequently elected as President of Zambia in 2021, where he had once again been supported by the Zambian Watchdog but not by Zgambo. Zgambo later stated that his lack of support for Hichilema led to him experiencing increased persecution from state authorities following Hichilema's election.

Since 2021, Zgambo has worked as a correspondent for the Zambian Whistleblower, another investigative news outlet that posts on social media, including Facebook, YouTube, and X. Zgambo's articles have been described as frequently critical of the ruling United Party for National Development.

On 28 November 2023, Zgambo was arrested and detained at Chilenje police station in Lusaka on charges of sedition for publishing an article "with a view to raise discontent and disaffection among the people of Zambia". The charge was in relation to a 17 October article published by the Zambian Whistleblower alleging that the Zambia National Service was importing "substandard" genetically modified maize from South Africa without informing Zambian consumers about the potential harm it could cause. Zgambo was released on bail on 1 December after paying a 50, 000 ZMW bond, with a further court hearing scheduled for 27 August 2024. The day after his release, the Zambian Whisteblower reposted the article.

On 6 August 2024, Zgambo was arrested and detained for two days after publishing an article on Facebook on 28 July criticising the government for renting a property allegedly linked to Hichilema, calling for government transparency, including Hichilema publicly declaring his assets. Zgambo was released on 8 August after being granted bail, with a court hearing scheduled for 22 August on charges of sedition.

In October 2024, Zgambo was arrested for a third time in a year while eating at a mall. He was held at a police station in Ridgeway, initially without charge, though it was reported it was linked to an article he had published that was critical of government officials. Zgambo reported from his prison cell that "these persistent arrests over my reporting are meant to silence me so I begin to report positively about the government".

The Committee to Project Journalists has called on Zambian authorities to drop all legal proceedings against Zgambo and to scrap laws that criminalised the work of the press. Amnesty International similarly called for Zgambo's release, emphasising that journalism was not a crime and that a free press, as well as freedom of expression, was guaranteed in the Constitution of Zambia.
