= Stella Adler Academy of Acting and Theatre =

Acting school and theater in Los Angeles

Coordinates: 34.1018°N 118.3382°W

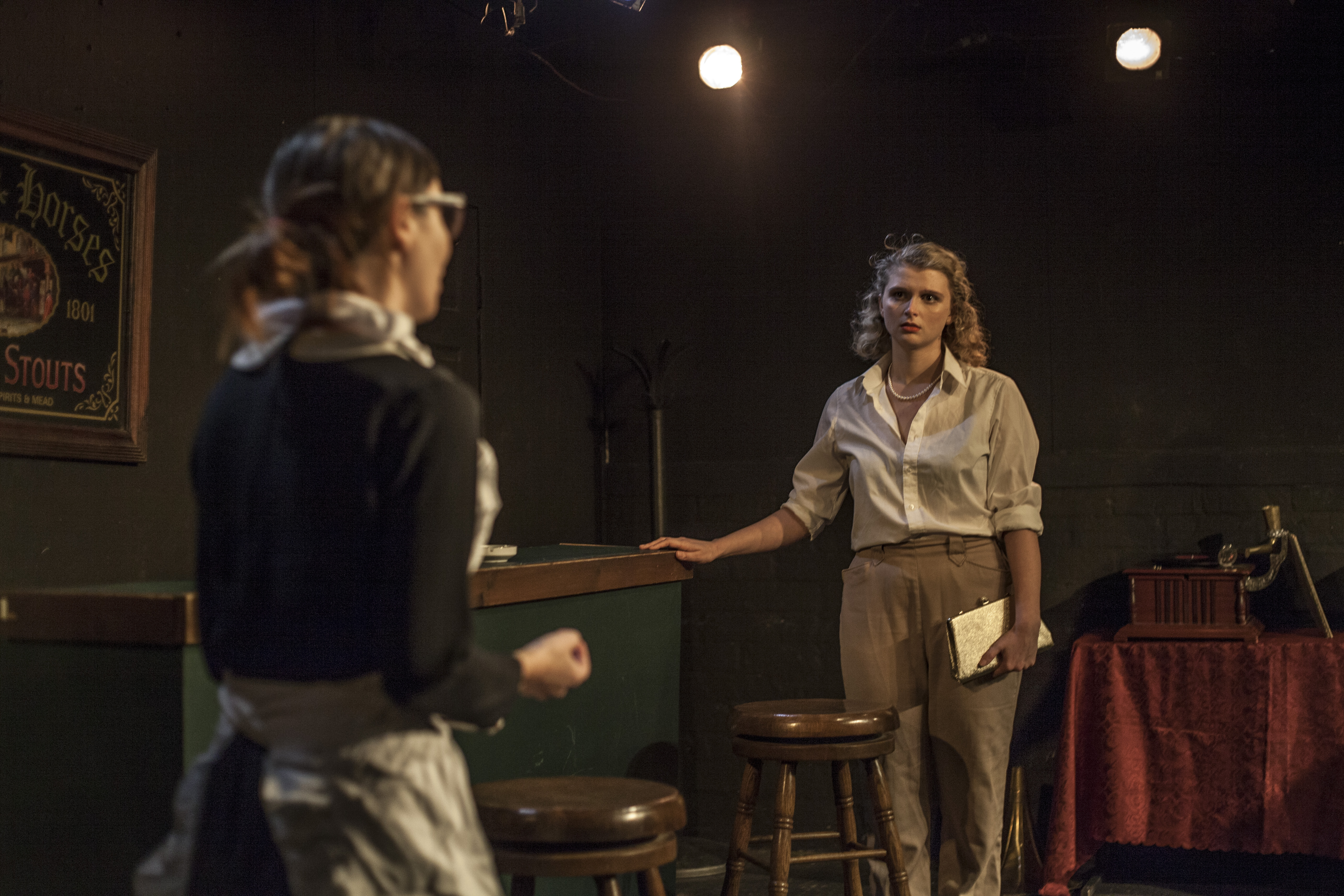
- Scene from the production of The Big Knife (2019) at the Stella Adler Academy of Acting
- Established: 1985
- Type: Drama school, conservatory
- Headquarters: Los Angeles, U.S.

The Stella Adler Academy of Acting and Theatre is an acting school in Los Angeles that stages live performances for the public. It was established in 1985 by actress and teacher Stella Adler, with Joanne Linville and Irene Gilbert. Actor Mark Ruffalo presently serves on the board of directors. The academy's two-year program emphasizes voice, movement, character, script analysis and theatre history.

The Stella Adler Academy of Acting and Theatre is not affiliated with the Stella Adler Studio of Acting, founded by Adler in 1949 in New York City. The Stella Adler Studio has a West Coast branch—the Art of Acting Studio—established in 2010. Although the two Stella Adler schools in Los Angeles are sometimes regarded as competitors, they frequently collaborate on programs and share faculty.

== History ==
Stella Adler's long history with Hollywood meant she had close ties and strong connections in the Los Angeles area. She taught for many years at various locations in Los Angeles, and eventually, with her longtime friend and protégé Joanne Linville, opened the doors to the Stella Adler Conservatory of Acting at the corner of Hollywood Boulevard and Argyle. Some of the notable people who have passed through the Hollywood conservatory include Nick Nolte, Salma Hayek, Eric Stoltz, Deidre Hall, Sean Astin, John Charles Jopson, John Ritter, Herschel Savage, Cybill Shepherd, Michael Richards, Benicio del Toro and Mark Ruffalo.

Protégés Joanne Linville and Irene Gilbert persuaded Stella Adler to open the academy in 1985 in Los Angeles. Together, Gilbert and Linville are considered the school's cofounders, with Adler granting them permission to use her name. Gilbert remained the director of the school for 20 years.

The original school was located in a small theater at Hollywood Boulevard and Argyle Avenue. A fire forced the temporary closure of the school in 1991. The building was threatened with demolition to make way for a proposed subway line at the time of Adler's death in 1992. In 1994, Irene Gilbert reopened the school's present location at 6773 Hollywood Boulevard and Highland Avenue. It was renamed the Stella Adler Academy of Acting, and celebrated its 25th anniversary in 2010. The historic location housed the famous Embassy Club in the 1930s.

The school is an acting studio offering extensive training for actors in theatre, film, and television. The facility houses the not-for-profit Stella Adler Theatre, the Irene Gilbert Theatre, The Studio C Theatre, classrooms, dance studio, music studio, library, dressing rooms, video and equipment room, scene shop, and administrative offices, all dedicated to teaching Adler's technique.

John Jack Rodgers has served as executive director of the Stella Adler Academy since 2007.

In 2010, alumni of the school formed the Stella Adler Los Angeles Theatre Collective.

== Notable alumni ==
- Charlene Amoia
- Sean Astin
- Clifton Collins Jr.
- Carly Craig
- Benicio del Toro
- Deidre Hall
- Salma Hayek
- Scott Haze
- John Charles Jopson
- Akende Munalula
- Nick Nolte
- Jim Parrack
- Rick Peters
- Chris Petrovski
- Michael Richards
- John Ritter
- Gary Ross
- Mark Ruffalo
- Herschel Savage
- Cybill Shepherd
- Eric Stoltz
- Holland Taylor
- Christopher Thornton
- Henry Winkler
