= Mwebantu =

Mwebantu News Media
- Mwebantu
- Company type: News
- Industry: News agency
- Founded: May 1, 2012; 14 years ago
- Headquarters: Off Lagos Road, Rhodes Park, Lusaka, Zambia
- Key people: Katuta Chilambe (Editor-in-chief)
- Owner: Mwebantu News Media
- Number of employees: 10
- Website: www.mwebantu.com

Mwebantu is a privately owned Zambian news outlet headquartered in Lusaka, operating an online news website and social media channels. It reports on breaking news and provides live coverage of events, supported by a number of correspondents across the country. The word 'Mwebantu' can be translated as "You the People". Mwebantu was founded in 2012 by Chilambe Katuta, a Thomson Reuters Foundation Alumni, who has served as editor-in-chief since 2017. It has an audience of more than 1 million.
