= Mass media in Zambia =

Country of Zambia

Mass media in Zambia consist of several different types of communications media: television, radio, cinema, newspapers, magazines, and Internet-based Web sites. The Ministry of Information, Broadcasting Services and Tourism is in charge of the Zambian News Agency which was founded in 1969. Due to the decolonization of the country, it ultimately allowed the media sector of the country to flourish, and enabled the establishment of multiple different new outlets, as well as established a new news consumption culture that wasn't previously known to Zambia. Furthermore, due to the short-wave capabilities, and international increase in production, demand, and sales of the transistor-radios in the country it made it increasingly more difficult to control the media outlets throughout Zambia by the leaders of the government.

Although many forms of mass media are available to Zambian citizens as the internet and social media develop, more traditional forms of media are still preferred. Radio and television are the most common forms of mass consumption for the average Zambian as they are the most accessible. However, as cellphones become more popular social media and text messaging have become new avenues for mass media. The Zambian Ministry of Information and Broadcasting Services houses the Zambian News and Information Services wing which provides news and information to the public and has since its formation in 2005. Despite the prevalence of nationally owned news, there are also various privately owned forms of media in Zambia as well.

== Freedom of the press ==
Freedoms of expression and of the press are constitutionally guaranteed in Zambia, but the government frequently restricts these rights in practice. Although the ruling Patriotic Front has pledged to free state-owned media—consisting of the Zambia National Broadcasting Corporation (ZNBC) and the widely circulated Zambia Daily Mail and Times of Zambia—from government editorial control, these outlets have generally continued to report along pro-government lines. Many journalists reportedly practice self-censorship since most government newspapers do have prepublication review. The ZNBC dominates the broadcast media, though several private stations have the capacity to reach large portions of the population.

The rights group Freedom House, which publishes annual country reports on press freedom status, has ranked Zambia's press as “Not Free” even in 2016.

== Constitution and press freedom ==
The freedom of the press is guaranteed to Zambians through the constitution that was adopted in 1991. Recently, as of 2010, however, there has been efforts to establish a new constitution with the help of the Zambian National Constitutional Conference (NCC). Their task was to review, analyze, and implement old provisions that had been previously listed in an earlier constitutional draft developed by the Mung'omba Constitutional Review Commission. The Mung'omba constitution extensively liberalized the media realm by declaring to protect the freedom of the press within the private and public sphere, as well as within the online realm with hardly any regulations attached. It had denied the state, or anyone els, the ability to harass, penalize, censor, or interfere with any broadcasting company on the basis of an opinion, view, or material that was being published throughout Zambia.

Zambian national flag

After the NCC had completed carefully reviewing, debating, and implementing the old provisions into the establishment of new constitution, the newly finalized draft of the Zambian constitution had excluded many of the liberalizing provisions of the Mung'omba constitution. This ultimately was due to speculation from government officials around the medias increased liberalization and the consequences that can come because of it. The trust between the state and journalists is, and was, tenuous. Due to this increased speculation it has ultimately led to the undermining of mass support for the freedom of the press, and the implementation of a regulator body, which could enhance accountability. Instead the state had decided to implement multiple penal codes in an effort to tighten liberalization on the media throughout Zambia. For example, slander, and especially slander against the active President, as well as seditious publications that would have the possibility of inciting uprisings, protests, or riots. With these types of policies and penal codes being adopted by the Zambian government professional journalists are facing multiple barriers to producing real constructive news. Opposition parties propaganda, messaging, and organizational capacities are, thus, being curtailed, as well as the capacity to facility growth in knowledge by increasing access to the internet and telecommunication systems.

== Media Development Policy ==
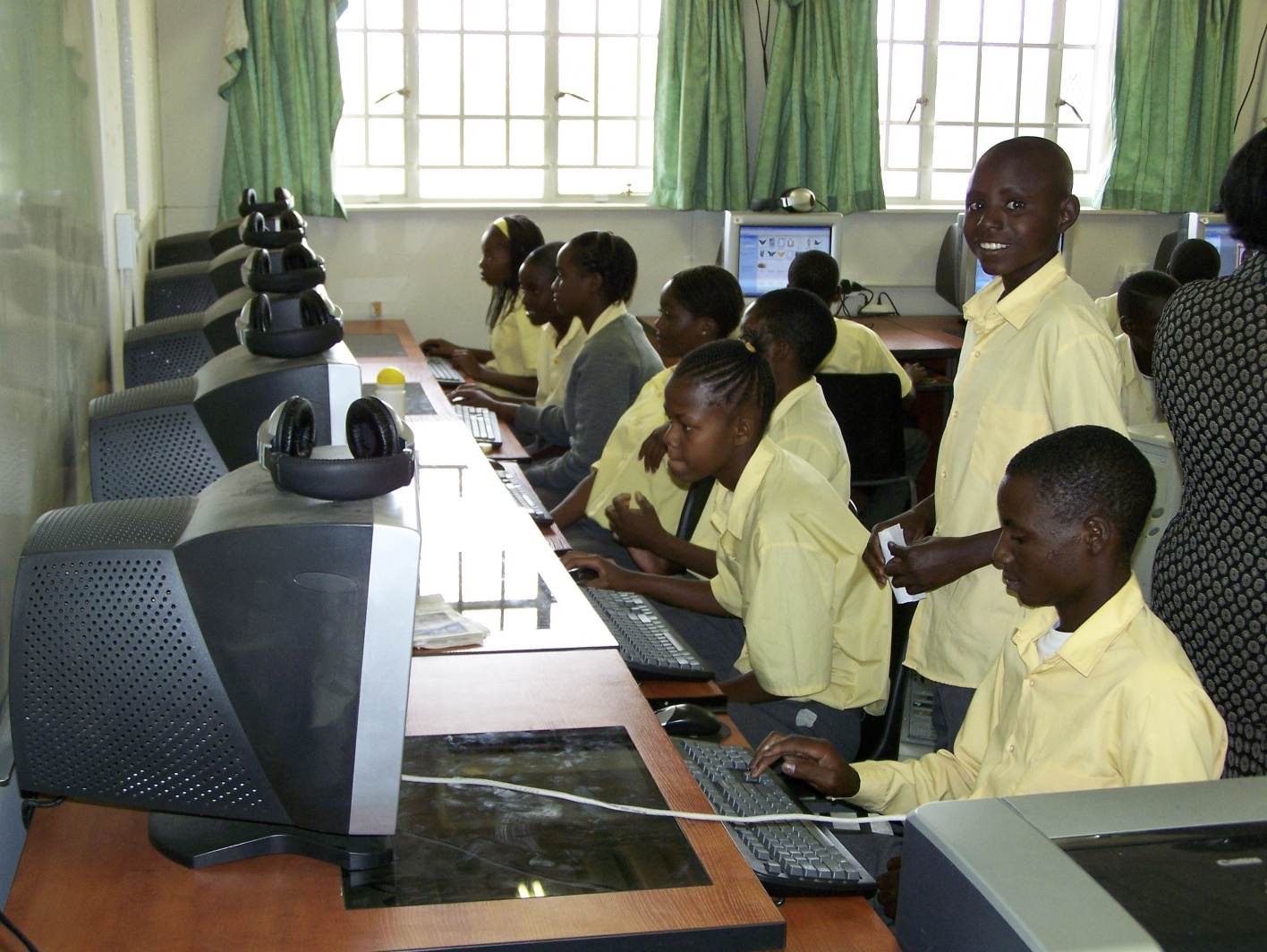

Even though there is still suspicion on the part of Zambian governmental elites, there has been major strides taken in order to enhance the accountability of the state, state officials, and normal citizenry more broadly. One of the steps taking place more recently, the Media Development Policy which was passed on 23 November 2020. Its mission consisted of five goals and objectives in order to enhance the freedom of the press which were; the fostering of a regulatory system to bolster press freedom, as well as diversity within the media sector; increasing the private ownership of media outlets and creating a space that levels the playing field to enhance equality, transparency, and accountability within the market; utilizing media platforms to ensure an avenue for citizens to engage in democratic discourse; increasing entrepreneurship and professionalism within the media realm; and lastly, investing in diverse economic sectors to facilitate the development of important media infrastructure needed to support the rapidly changing media market. The hope is that Zambia can move away from the restrictive nature of the media and foster its abilities in order to produce a media sector that can be a stable sector of the economy, but also as a pillar to enhance democracy and accountability within the state of Zambia. There is also hope through the point of view of journalists as well, especially due to the ever increasing nature of violence threats and acts against journalists by the state, political parities and their followers.

== Penal codes and press freedom ==
There are a multitude of different Penal codes that the Zambian government has implemented in order to curtail media freedom, and more specifically investigative journalism. One example is, Section 53, which gives the executive the power to abolish any publications that he found to be a threat against the public interest. While this does allow the state to curb any hateful, racists, and hurtful speech that might be able to benefit the Zambian society, it also grants the president gate-keeper abilities defining what is best for the public interest and what is not. In 1989, the Zambia president utilized this avenue to ban, "The Satanic Verses." In 1996, The Post, was also banned from publishing within the state of Zambia. Other sections that fall within this category are Sections 54 and 55 as well.

Sections 57 and 60, define laws of sedition; Sections 67 deals with the publication of false news with intent to cause fear and alarm to the public; Section 69 outlaws defamation of the executive; Section 102 criminalizes the impersonation of law enforcement of any other governmental employ by a journalists in order to obtain valuable information; Section 116, contempt of Courts, where journalists are by law required to grant the court evidence, and sources, if ever summoned as a witness in court, ultimately forcing journalists to violate trust between journalists and sources.

The State Security Act, Chapter 111 of the Laws of Zambia also diminishes the freedom of the press. The Act was enacted jail time for up to 15 years for leaking classified information by either state officials or the journalists and media outlets that leaked it. Though the Act was initially intended enhance the states capabilities to security and defend against inter and intra state threats, journalists have broken this law in order to sound the alarm on the state when the state itself ultimately became the threat to the Zambian citizenries security. Examples can be seen in 1999, when the media out, The Post, leaked an article displaying a contrasting image of Zambias military capabilities to that of Angolas military capabilities, eliminating the country on how ill-prepared and equipped the state of Zambia was to go to war with Angola. Ultimately, The Post, its editor and report were charged with espionage through the means of The State Security Act.

== Internet and media ==
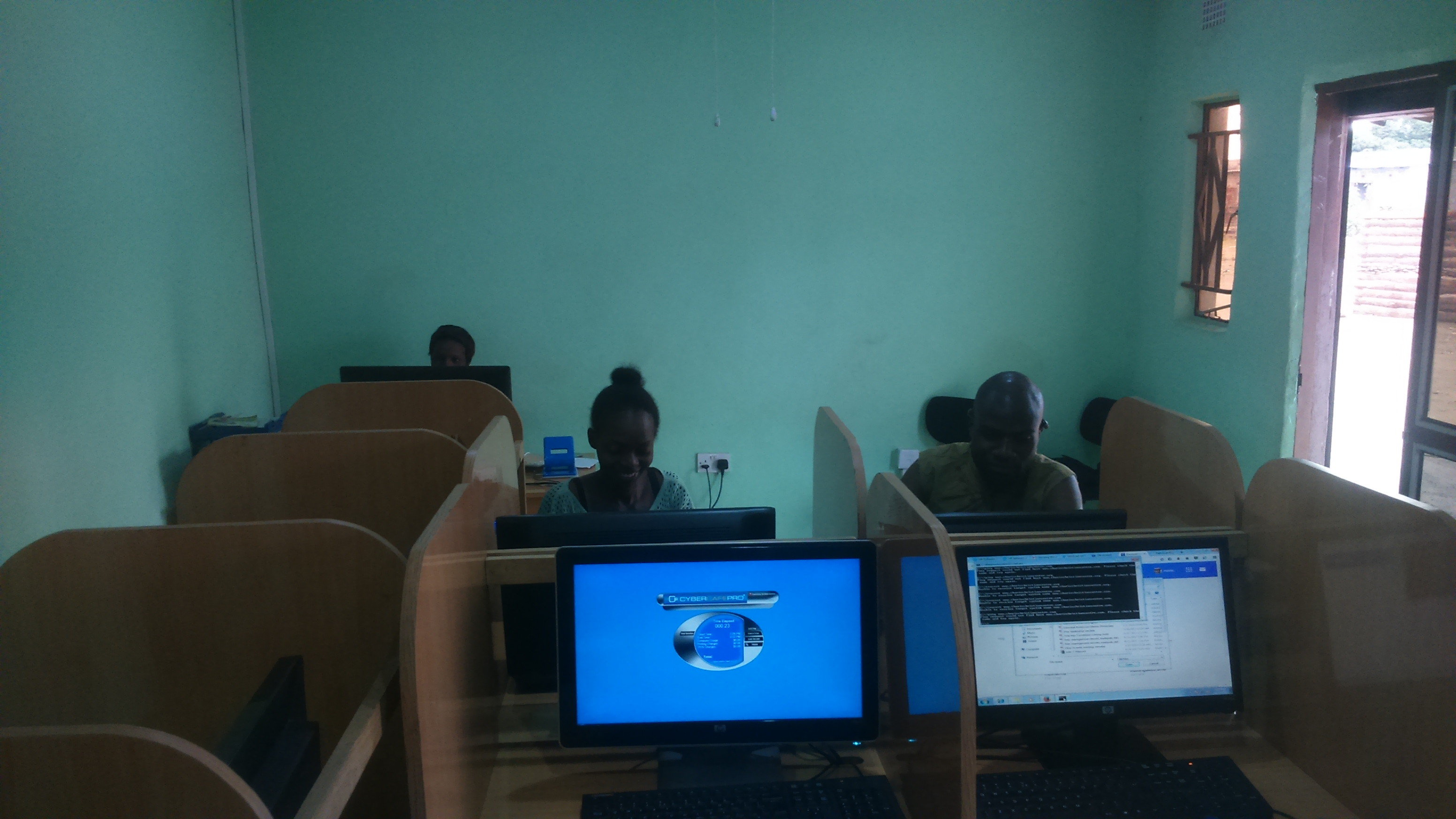
Internet cafe in Zambia.

Internet access in Zambia still remains relatively inaccessible for the average citizen. According to a 2020 report by Freedom House Zambia is considered partly free when discussing internet freedom. The score takes into consideration how the internet remains inaccessible in more rural areas of Zambia. It also takes into consideration the restrictions that the government has placed on media and information on the internet. This includes allegations from members of opposition parties that their platforms and information is difficult to access or restricted on the internet and alleged social media blackouts. Despite potential limitations in access to the internet, it remains a key way to access and consume media in Zambia.

== Social media ==
Zambians, as well as Zambian news outlets, have adapted to the growing increase in technological innovation, such as the internet, cell phones, and even social media apps like Facebook and Instagram. This adaptability of the Zambians citizenry, as well as Media, have allowed for greater participation throughout the whole of Zambia. This has increased a sense of democracy, and voice of citizens, where individuals can communicate, post, share, and tag other Zambians in real time. Even "Old Media," such as the radio and television stations have adopted utilizing social media in order to enhance participation of the public, as well as stay competitive with other news media outlets throughout the country. This newly adopted social media phenomenon has mainly been targeted at the younger, middle class, Zambian population, but has also enhanced the elderly, and poorer communities, capabilities to participate as well. With the dramatic uptick in the available access to cellphones and internet connection, a little less than half of the Zambian population has access to cellphone lines. With this greater increase in accessibility to the internet and social media, listeners are able to be better informed about special events, news, and even politics within the country of Zambia. Although there is still a significant amount of the population that still does not have access to the internet, this potentially opens up the doors for greater participation of the citizenry that does have access, as well as helps fuel the fire for the need to have greater accessibility to the internet, and cellphones use.

Zambia's government has even taken steps to enhance the accessibility of the internet and telecommunication networks throughout the country. The National Information and Communication Technology (ICT) policies were implemented in 2001, and were then finalized in 2005. The hopes with the ICT policies is to create an attractive market within Zambia that would entice international investors to invest in developing and expanding the telecommunication and information infrastructure. This would not only increase accessibility of internet and telecommunications network in rural areas, but also help increase employment opportunities throughout the country as well.

Facebook is the most used social media platform in Zambia with around 2.2 million Zambians using the platform. From there other social media platforms have less than one million users. The most popular social media applications from there are Linkedin, Instagram, and Twitter. YouTube is also a popular platform for Zambians to consume media with some of the most popular forms of content consumed being how to videos and music.

Platforms like Facebook and Twitter have been a place for citizens to get news quickly as seen in recent elections. There is a lot of engagement with social media platforms leading up to elections to get news on the potential candidates and their platforms. Social media has given Zambians the opportunity to compare different news sites and the information they have on candidates. Not only are these social media sites important in the lead up to the election, they are also important afterward. Citizens look to sites like Facebook to get live updates about elections and candidates post-election as well. However, in the recent 2021 election, there was controversy over what was considered to be a government shutdown of social media platforms on election day. Applications like WhatsApp, Twitter, and Facebook were not reachable and it called into question the relationship between the media and the government. However, as information continues to be made readily available to citizens through social media, questions have been raised about how much social media can really be limited.

== Investigative journalism ==
Paul Monde Shalala is an experienced journalist who has worked in television, print and radio stations

Besides these common barriers, the Penal Codes and other restrictive policies, such as The State Security Act, it has made it increasingly difficult for media journalists to fulfill their obligations to society as journalists. Some of the challenges and concerns that are put forth by journalists outside of the realm of Penal Codes and policies can be heard as; low to inadequate staffing levels, lack of resources, low salaries, inadequate training, inability to access important information from public and private institutions, self censorship due to fear of repercussions and consequences, media outlet ownership type, increasing political violence targeted at journalists, a lack of media awards and recognition to incentives investigative journalism, technological knowledge gaps, and lastly, ethics.

Investigative Journalism in Zambia can take on many forms. For example, political, good governance, religious, non governmental organizations (NGO's), land, environment, agriculture, pricing, and even exploitation of corporate enterprises and institutions. Not all investigative journalism has to deal with wrongdoings, and corruption.

In recent years, however, specifically under the newly elected President Edgar Lungu, Lungu has taking a stronger stance towards private media firms throughout Zambia. He is shut down multiple media outlets, as well as revoked license approvals held by media outlets that publish incriminating stories about the government and its officials. This not only leads to insecurity amongst journalists, but also the Zambian people as a whole. What is most interesting about this situation is the fact that a large majority of parliament officials agree that Zambia needs a more liberalized media sector, but the Zambian state is increasingly hesitant in delivering on their opinion.

== Radio ==
Radio stations in Zambia have evolved exponentially since the adoption of the radio during the period of colonization. Although Zambia has been known to be hesitant in the liberalization of the media, the radio was liberalized by the establishment and implementation of the Zambia National Broadcasting Licensing Regulations in December 1993. The country saw a rapid uptick in the number of radio stations throughout the country, going from only 12 stations in 2000, to 48 in 2008. Radio stations have transformed from simply relaying the current news to a small audience that is confined within a small geographical area to having extended broadband width and range allowing for news to be received throughout the entire country and sometime beyond, as well as radio stations adding the ability for average citizens to engage, participate, and interact with a live broadcast.

The newly heightened ability of the citizenry to actively participate in a live broadcast from a popular radio station has heightened the voice of the population tremendously. Zambian's actively participate through the help of "new media," such as the Internet and Mobile Phones. This then allows Zambians to utilize "new media" technology, by means of text messaging, emails, phoning in, and even utilizing apps, such as Facebook, Instagram, etc. to not only actively engage with the radio station, but also other average Zambians throughout the country, as well as important interviewees, such as political leaders, prominent businessmen, and other elites within the state. This ultimately creates a space for dialog to occur between elites and non-elites. This occurs on multiple radio stations platforms, such as: The Zambia National Broadcasting Corporation's, "Government Forum," a public broadcaster; Radio Phoenix's, "Let The People Talk," Q FM's, "Monday Night Live" and "Public's Last Say," and Flava FM, three commercial radio stations; Radio Icengelo's, "Face to Face with the Community," and Sky FM's, "Sky Forum" and "Face the Media," both community radio stations.

== Podcasts ==
Podcasting is a very recent phenomenon that has become popular internationally. Zambia is no exception to this as podcasting has become a very popular form of media consumption in the country. There are a wide variety of different types of podcasts, from anything ranging from religious, news, business, economics, sports, and personal content. As podcasting becomes a more popular form of media consumption, many have seen it as an opportunity for community building and engagement. This can be seen through some podcasts that emphasize the importance of culture and community building. There are even some podcasts in Zambia which are meant to update members of the Zambian diaspora on Zambian culture and daily life. There is one in particular which is called the ZambiaBlogTalkRadio. Podcasts in Zambia are mainly listened to through platforms like Youtube, Player.fm, and Spotify. Although podcasting is not widely accessible yet, it is estimated that demand for content presented in podcast format will grow in popularity.

== Television ==
Television is a popular form of mass media in Zambia, with approximately 67 percent of people watching television on a regular basis. Some television channels after multilingual and some are specifically English-only channels. There are both privately-owned media and government-owned media. In the early 2010s there was a shift from analogue television broadcasting to digital television. Considering the expensive nature of switching to digital programming, the Zambian government sought out the help of foreign investment. The investment towards the shift was led both by the Zambian government and a leading Chinese media conglomerate, StarTimes, helped provide the digital signals. StarTimes owns about 60 percent of the media signaling with the government-owned broadcasting service the Zambian National Broadcasting Corporation (ZNBC) owning the other 40 percent. Through the shift to digital programming, there has been an increase in the number of channels now available to the Zambian public that was not before. There is possible concern, however, that the prospect of new channels has not been used to promote local programs but instead has served to give a platform for Chinese media content.

Privately owned television channels dominate the majority of the television channels, with around 42 channels being privately owned. The Zambian National Broadcasting Corporation (ZNBC), which is government-run, owns three different television channels. The ZNBC provides their content through traditional television, radio, as well as live streaming. According to the Information and Broadcast Services Minister Dora Siliya, the ZNBC channels are the most popular among Zambian citizens. It is considered to be the most consumed form of broadcast news in Zambia because it is a publicly -owned station and therefore the signal it operates on is public and more widely accessible.

== Newspapers ==
There are dozens of newspapers in Zambia, the majority of which are privately owned. The Zambian News and Information Services (ZANIS), the public relations sector of the Ministry of Information and Media owns both the Zambia Daily Mail and the Times of Zambia. Newspapers are one of the biggest forms of receiving information in Zambia and there has been a recent uptick in newspaper consumption from its introduction into the digital sphere. Newspapers and digital news websites have become more popular. In 2002, there were only 4 newspapers in Zambia, two of which were nationally owned. As of 2020, there are 36 newspapers and news websites. Other privately owned Zambian newspapers and digital news outlets include News Diggers!, which Reporters Without Borders has listed among Zambia's influential newspapers.

One of the biggest Zambian newspapers with a growing digital platform is the Lusaka Times. The Lusaka Times launched its website in 2007 and has gone through many updates and changes since then. It not only provides news daily and on various topics, but it also provides Zambians an opportunity to post their own articles. This is a free service that allows those who want a platform to post their content the right to do so. In order to post content to the website, the author needs to claim the content to be theirs in its entirety. This has served as a way for Zambians to open source information and feel involved in the process of media. It is important to point out, however, that the literacy rate in Zambia is around 80 percent which explains why broadcast news, television, and radio may be more popular forms of consuming media.

== Magazines ==
Partners Guide is a leading magazine discussing business and economic issues which is available online. The Bulletin & Record is an established magazine discussing political issues.

== See also ==
- Telecommunications in Zambia
