= Bantu Educational Kinema Experiment =

The Bantu Educational Kinema Experiment (BEKE) was a project of the International Missionary Council in coordination with the Carnegie Corporation of New York and British colonial governments of Tanganyika, Kenya, Uganda, Northern Rhodesia and Nyasaland in the mid-1930s. The project involved educational films played by mobile cinemas to educate the black ("bantu") people. About 35 such films, on 16mm, were produced between 1935 and 1937, when the Carnegie grant expired. The project was led by J. Merle Davis, director of the International Missionary Council's Department of Social and Industrial Research; George Chitty Latham, former head of Northern Rhodesia's Education Department; and Major Leslie Allen Notcutt, a former plantation manager in Kenya.

BEKE productions were low-quality silent films with naive plots that usually involved a "wise guy" (giving the good example) prevailing over a "stupid guy" (impersonating bad habits). While some actors were black, everything else in the production was British, building on a stereotypical representation of Africa and Africans. The main teachings conveyed by the films were about hygiene, methods of cash crop cultivation and cooperative marketing; others were "prestige films" that highlighted the institutions of British rule. Only three BEKE films survive, and are held at the British Film Institute Archives:

- "Veterinary Training of African Natives" (1936),
- "Tropical Hookworm" (1936), and
- "African Peasant Farms - the Kingolwira Experiment" (1936).

== See also ==
- African Films Trust
- Kanye Cinema Experiment
