= Irene Gilbert =

American actress (1934–2011)

Irene Gilbert (born Irene Liebert or Liebeschutz; August 25, 1934 – May 21, 2011) was a German-born American actress and acting school director, who co-founded the Stella Adler Academy of Acting and Theatre in Los Angeles, with actress Joanne Linville, in 1985. She served as the academy's director for around two decades after its establishment.

== Early life ==
Gilbert was born as Irene Liebert or Liebeschutz in Brandenburg, Germany on August 25, 1934. She immigrated to New York City with her parents, Gaston and Lucie Liebert (or Liebeschutz), just before the outbreak of World War II. Her parents were killed by a drunk driver when she was just five years old. She was raised by her Aunt Erika, her four older brothers, Ralph, Werner, Jerry, and John, and their mother Ruth Mitler.

== Career ==
She changed her surname to Gilbert when she began her acting career, reportedly because she felt that it seemed "movie-star-esque." Her acting career extended into the late 1980s. Her television credits included roles in Medical Center, her first role in 1969, General Hospital, Cannon, Barnaby Jones and Emergency! in the 1970s, as well as Designing Women, Crazy Like a Fox and others in the 1980s, with her last role, Highway To Heaven in 1989.

Gilbert became friends with New York City-based acting coach Stella Adler during the 1960s. In 1985, Gilbert and actress Joanne Linville pursued Adler to open the Stella Adler Academy in Los Angeles.

Gilbert also served as the school's director for 20 years. A fire at the school, which was originally located in a small theater at Hollywood Boulevard and Argyle Avenue, forced the school's temporary closure in 1991. The school's building was further threatened with demolition to make way for a proposed subway line at the time of Adler's death, in 1992.

Gilbert moved and reopened the school in 1994 at a building which was once the Embassy Club, a private club in the 1930s at Hollywood Boulevard and Highland Avenue. She continued to teach acting at the school and produce stage productions. The Stella Adler Academy in Los Angeles named one of its theaters, the Irene Gilbert Theatre, in honor of her.

== Death ==
Gilbert died, aged 76, on May 21, 2011, from complications of Alzheimer's disease, in Eureka, California.
