= Akende Munalula =

Zambia-born American actor

- Born: Lusaka, Zambia
- Education: Stella Adler Academy of Acting and Theatres
- Occupations: Producer, actor, writer, rapper, poet
- Years active: 1989–present
- Height: 187 cm (6 ft 2 in)
- Children: 2
- Website: www.akende.com

Akende Munalula, is a Zambian actor, writer, producer, rapper and poet. He is best known for the roles in the films Boo 2! A Madea Halloween, Unexpected Guests and television serials Counterpart and The Salon.

== Personal life ==
He was abandoned by his biological British father in Lusaka, Zambia when he was just three months old. After that, he and his brothers were raised by his mother alone. His mother worked as a typist. When he was eight, het met his stepfather, a Welsh artist who taught art at the International School of Lusaka. During this period, he visited library more often and became a fluent reader. Therefore, he became interested in writing and won several awards for the English language in high school.

He is married and the couple has two children. He currently lives and works in Los Angeles, California.

== Career ==
After high school life, he moved to advertising, and worked as a successful copywriter for more than ten years. Then he moved to performance stage and became a rapper, where he produced two successful albums including: "A.S.H. RISEN". But in 2012, he left Zambia and settled in Toronto, Canada for about six months. Then in 2012 he joined the Stella Adler Academy of Acting and Theatre and studied drama. He graduated from the academy in 2014. In 2015, he joined the Screen Actors Guild, SAG-AFTRA to become a professional actor. In the same year, he wrote and starred in the short film City of Dreams. The film made its premier at the Action On Film festival. After the success, he appeared in few more short films such as Tear Jerker, The Incision, The Hitchhiker, Primers, Prayers of a Pessimist and Rayven Choi.

He has acted in number of international television serials and films such as Deputy, Counterpart, Tyler Perry's Boo 2: A Madea Halloween. In the film Boo 2, he played the role "Calvin". The film became a huge blockbuster hit as well. He also acted in the independent production The New 30, which was later nominated for Emmy Awards. In 2019, he returned Zambia to attend the launching of the Filmmakers Guild of Zambia with Lawrence Thompson and the Ministry of Information and Broadcasting. Then he conducted teaching acting classes to actors and teaching Directing Actors to young directors from Southern Africa at the MultiChoice Talent Factory. In 2020, he appeared in the serial The Salon.

== Filmography ==
Year	Film	Role	Genre	Ref.
2014	Justice	Milton Justice, producer, writer	Short film	
2014	The Incision	Chansa	Short film	
2014	The Hitchhiker	Death	Short film	
2016	Tear Jerker	Paul	Short film	
2016	Primer	James Whitiker	Short film	
2016	Prayers of a Pessimist	Detective Colden	Short film	
2016	The Perfect Plan	Agent R., producer, writer	Film	
2016	Rayven Choi	Dorian Glover	Short film	
2016	City of Dreams	Tom, producer, writer	Short film	
2017	The New 30	Kelvin	TV series	
2017	Boo 2! A Madea Halloween	Calvin	Film	
2017	A Teen's Survival Guide 4 When ish Happens: The All-Star	Ronnie	Short film	
2018	Counterpart	Pascal	TV series	
2018	Muzo	Martin	TV movie	
2019	Cheating Death	Angel of Death	Video	
2019	Cheating Death	Angel of Death	TV Mini Series	
2019	The Reaper	Kelly	Short film	
2020	Where Butterflies Perish	Actor, Co-producer	Short film	
2020	The Long Road Home	Henry	Short film	
2020	The Salon	Abimbola	TV series	
2017	Unexpected Guests	Peter Shan	Film	
TBD	Life of Riley	Jeremy	Short film	
TBD	Coercion	Dev	TV series	
