= Zambia Information and Communications Technology Authority =

Communications & IT regulatory authority in Zambia

Agency overview
- Formed: 2009
- Preceding agency: Communications Authority
- Jurisdiction: Government of Zambia
- Headquarters: Lusaka, Zambia
- Agency executive: Patrick Mutimushi, Director General
- Parent department: Ministry of Transport, Works, Supply and Communications
- Website: www.zicta.zm

The Zambia Information and Communications Technology Authority (ZICTA) is a regulatory body responsible for regulating the ICT industry in Zambia. It is authorised by three Acts — the Electronic Communications and Transactions Act No. 21, the Information and Communications Technologies (ICT) Act No. 15 of 2009, and the Postal Services Act No. 22 of 2009 — and regulates ICT, postal and courier services in Zambia. ZICTA is governed by a Board of Authority of nine executive members; all decisions of the Board are executed by the Director General. It is most visible to the public and active through their Facebook page relating to issues pertaining to the mobile phone market. In November 2019 the Zambian Minister of Transport and Communications dissolved the ZICTA board.

== Mandate ==
According to their website, ZICTA's mandate is as follows:

- "Regulate the provision of electronic communication services and products in Zambia.
- "Monitor the performance of the sector including levels of investment and availability, quality, costs and standards of electronic communication services.
- "Administer the country code top-level domain (.zm) as well as electronic addresses.
- "Disseminate information and promote the participation by the public in the provision of electronic communication services.
- "Provide for a national frequency and numbering plan.
- "Set standards for the ICT sector.
- "Promote competition in the sector and also regulate tariffs charged by operators offering electronic communication services.
- "Protect the rights and interests of consumers, service providers, suppliers and manufacturers."

== See also ==
- Outline of Zambia
- Commonwealth Telecommunications Organisation
