= Zambian Watchdog =

The Zambian Watchdog is a Zambian online news blogsite that reports on politics, governance and current affairs. Established in 2009, it has operated from outside Zambia while relying on anonymous contributors within the country. The publication is known for investigative reporting and for its critical coverage of successive Zambian governments.

== History ==
The website was established in 2009. According to the Committee to Protect Journalists (CPJ), members of its editorial team left Zambia after receiving threats and continued publishing from exile using information supplied by anonymous correspondents based in Zambia.

== Government relations ==
In July 2013, internet service providers in Zambia blocked access to the Zambian Watchdog. The Committee to Protect Journalists described the action as an attack on press freedom and called on the authorities to restore access to the website. Reporters Without Borders (RSF) also criticised the blocking of the website and reported that several journalists alleged to have contributed to the publication had been arrested or charged. RSF stated that the publication operated from outside Zambia using material supplied by anonymous correspondents inside the country.

Government officials have accused the publication of publishing false or inflammatory reports, allegations that the publication has denied.

== See also ==
- Media of Zambia
