= .zm =

Internet country code top-level domain for Zambia

- Introduced: 25 March 1994
- TLD type: Country code top-level domain
- Status: Active
- Registry: Zambia Information and Communications Technology Authority
- Sponsor: Zambia Information and Communications Technology Authority
- Intended use: Entities connected with Zambia
- Actual use: Gets some use in Zambia, although .com is more widely used.
- Registration restrictions: Legal entities with a presence in Zambia.
- Structure: Registrations are made at the third level beneath established sub-domains; registered ISPs can register at the second level, although there are some unexplained exceptions to this rule.
- Registry website: ZICTA

.zm is the Internet country code top-level domain (ccTLD) for Zambia. Registrants of .zm domains must "have a presence in Zambia".

== Second-level domains ==
Registrants are required to register domains at the third level under an existing second-level domain (SLD). There are eleven second-level domains:

- ac.zm: Academic institutions
- biz.zm: Businesses
- co.zm: Commercial entities
- com.zm: Commercial entities
- edu.zm: Academic institutions
- gov.zm: Government
- info.zm: "Information"
- mil.zm: Zambian military
- net.zm: Networks
- org.zm: Non-commercial organizations
- sch.zm: Schools

The designations above are assumed based on observed practices and standard conventions, as ZICTA (the ccTLD registry) do not maintain online documentation codifying this. Most entities will generally register either a .co.zm or .org.zm domain, if they choose to use the ccTLD rather than a generic top-level domain.

The one documented exception to the requirement to register at the third level is that "registered ISPs" may register at the second level—e.g., zamtel.zm. However, there are several undocumented variances to this rule—e.g., the Bank of Zambia's domain is boz.zm, and the regulator (ZICTA) operates under zicta.zm.

== Registrars ==
ISPs are required to be registered with ZICTA, and only registered ISPs may be accredited as registrars. ZICTA lists ISPs on their website.
