= John Merle Davis =

John Merle Davis (1875-1960) was an American missionary, who wrote as J. Merle Davis. He was a YMCA missionary in Japan, and an executive of the International Missionary Council (IMC).

== Life ==
John Merle Davis was born on 1 October 1875 in Kyoto, the son of American Congregationalist missionaries. He graduated in 1899 from Oberlin College. He started doctoral studies in Germany, intending to return to Japan to teach. On the invitation of John R. Mott he took charge of the new YMCA in Nagasaki, later moving to the Tokyo YMCA. In 1923-4 he investigated anti-Japanese feeling in California, leading to his involvement in the Institute of Pacific Relations. In 1929 he became founding director of the IMC's Department of Economic and Social Research and Counsel, and worked there until retirement in 1949. He travelled extensively to visit new churches, and wrote reports on the Copperbelt, Sumatra, the Caribbean and South America.

== Works ==
- Modern industry and the African: an enquiry into the effect of the copper mines of Central Africa upon native society and the work of the Christian missions, 1933
- New Buildings on Old Foundations: A Handbook on Stabilizing the Younger Churches in Their Environment, 1943
- John Merle Davie: An Autobiography, 1960
