= Zambia Daily Mail =

English-language newspaper in Zambia

The Zambia Daily Mail is an English-language daily broadsheet newspaper published in Zambia. It is one of two state-owned papers of the Zambian government.

== History and operations ==
The newspaper arose from the Central African Mail, which was bought by the government from David Astor in 1965 who was the majority shareholder. From its inception and first edition in February 1960 the editor was Richard Seymour Hall. It was a pro independence paper training Zambians to take over and be the journalists and printers. Upon Nationalisation after independence Richard Hall was replaced but he went on to be the first editor of the Times of Zambia. Richard Hall and Dr Alexander Scott were investors but David Astor was the majority shareholder. It was renamed the Zambian Mail and subsequently the Zambia Daily Mail in 1970. The paper soon became a mouthpiece for the government, publishing official statements and press releases, while being instructed to become an "instrument in nation building". However, this saw a decline in readership and advertising.

In 2005, its circulation figures were estimated to be between 10,000 and 15,000.

== See also ==
- Communications in Zambia
- List of newspapers in Zambia
