= Zambia News Agency =

- Company type: News agency
- Industry: News media
- Founded: Zambia (1969)
- Headquarters: Lusaka, Zambia
- Website: link

Zambia News Agency also known as ZANA was the official Zambian news agency. It was established in 1969, and had its headquarters in Lusaka and branches all over Zambia. In 2005, ZANA was merged with the Zambia Information Services (ZIS) to form the Zambia News and Information Services (ZANIS), a public relations public media organisation under the Zambian Ministry of Information, Broadcasting Services and Tourism.
